= 2023–24 Siena Saints men's basketball team =

American college basketball season

2023–24 Siena Saints men's basketball
- Conference: Metro Atlantic Athletic Conference
- Record: 4–28 (3–17 MAAC)
- Head coach: Carmen Maciariello (5th season)
- Assistant coaches: Bobby Castagna; Antoni Wyche; Andy Farrell
- Home arena: MVP Arena

2023–24 MAAC men's basketball standings
	Conf.				Overall
Team	W		L	PCT	W		L	PCT
Quinnipiac	15	–	5	.750	24	–	10	.706
Fairfield	14	–	6	.700	24	–	13	.649
Marist	12	–	8	.600	18	–	13	.581
Rider	12	–	8	.600	15	–	17	.469
Saint Peter's †	12	–	8	.600	19	–	14	.576
Niagara	11	–	9	.550	16	–	16	.500
Iona	10	–	10	.500	16	–	17	.485
Mount St. Mary's	9	–	11	.450	13	–	19	.406
Canisius	8	–	12	.400	14	–	18	.438
Manhattan	4	–	16	.200	7	–	23	.233
Siena	3	–	17	.150	4	–	28	.125
† 2024 MAAC tournament winner

The 2023–24 Siena Saints men's basketball team represented Siena College during the 2023–24 NCAA Division I men's basketball season. The Saints, led by fifth-year head coach Carmen Maciariello, played their home games at MVP Arena in Albany, New York as members of the Metro Atlantic Athletic Conference (MAAC).

== Previous season ==
The Saints finished the 2022–23 season 17–15, 11–9 in MAAC play, to finish tied for third place. They were defeated by Niagara in the quarterfinals of the MAAC tournament.

== Roster ==
2023–24 Siena Saints men's basketball team
Players
Coaches

Pos.	#	Name	Height	Weight	Year	Previous school	Hometown
G	0	Zek Tekin	6 ft 2 in (1.88 m)	166 lb (75 kg)	So	Ozel Esenkent Okaynus Anadolu Lisesi	Istanbul, Turkey
G	1	Sean Durugordon	6 ft 5 in (1.96 m)	216 lb (98 kg)	RS Jr	Austin Peay	Harlem, NY
G	2	Bralyn Smith	6 ft 5 in (1.96 m)	171 lb (78 kg)	Fr	St. Benedict's Prep	Grand Prairie, TX
G	3	Michael Eley	6 ft 4 in (1.93 m)	178 lb (81 kg)	So	Veritas Prep Academy (FL)	Fort Wayne, IN
F	5	Giovanni Emejuru	6 ft 11 in (2.11 m)	265 lb (120 kg)	RS So	Sam Houston	Leicester, England
G	7	Mosi Clayton	6 ft 1 in (1.85 m)	180 lb (82 kg)	Fr	Believe Prep	Brooklyn, NY
F	11	Michael Ojo	6 ft 7 in (2.01 m)	212 lb (96 kg)	Fr	Moravian Prep	Virginia Beach, VA
F	12	Sveinn Birgisson	6 ft 8 in (2.03 m)	196 lb (89 kg)	So	South Iceland College	Reykjavík, Iceland
G	13	Kyle Winters	6 ft 3 in (1.91 m)	198 lb (90 kg)	Fr	New Hampton School	Corte Madera, CA
G	15	Mason Courtney	6 ft 4 in (1.93 m)	176 lb (80 kg)	So	Shenendehowa High School	Clifton Park, NY
F	20	Killian Gribben	6 ft 10 in (2.08 m)	215 lb (98 kg)	So	Choate Rosemary Hall	Letterkenny, Ireland
F	21	Brendan Coyle	6 ft 7 in (2.01 m)	207 lb (94 kg)	So	Cushing Academy	Niskayuna, NY
G	22	Michael Evbagharu	6 ft 4 in (1.93 m)	220 lb (100 kg)	Fr	Royal Crown Academic School	Scarborough, ON
F	24	Carson White	6 ft 8 in (2.03 m)	223 lb (101 kg)	Fr	Desert Vista High School	Phoenix, AZ
F	33	Steven Lazar	6 ft 6 in (1.98 m)	179 lb (81 kg)	Sr	Crestwood Prep	Toronto, ON
F	34	Max Frazier	6 ft 9 in (2.06 m)	196 lb (89 kg)	Fr	Northwood High School	Pittsboro, NC

Head coach

- Carmen Maciariello (Siena)

Assistant coach(es)

- Bobby Castagna (CSUN)
- Antoni Wyche (Notre Dame)
- Andy Farrell (Dayton)

Legend

- (C) Team captain
- (S) Suspended
- (I) Ineligible
- (W) Walk-on
- Injured
- Current redshirt

Roster
Last update: November 25, 2023

== Schedule and results ==
Date time, TV	Rank^{#}	Opponent^{#}	Result	Record	Site (attendance) city, state
Regular season
November 6, 2023*; 7:00 p.m., ESPN+		Holy Cross	W 73–71	1–0	MVP Arena (4,474); Albany, NY
November 11, 2023*; 8:00 p.m., ESPN+		at Richmond; Sunshine Slam campus-site game	L 48–90	1–1	Robins Center (4,543); Richmond, VA
November 13, 2023*; 7:00 p.m., ESPN+		at American	L 58–78	1–2	Bender Arena (1,114); Washington, D.C.
November 20, 2023*; 11:30 a.m., FloHoops		vs. Central Michigan; Sunshine Slam Ocean Bracket semifinals	L 56–70	1–3	Ocean Center; Daytona Beach, FL
November 21, 2023*; 9:00 p.m., FloHoops		vs. Milwaukee; Sunshine Slam Ocean Bracket consolation game	L 59–61	1–4	Ocean Center (1,502); Daytona Beach, FL
November 26, 2023*; 5:00 p.m., ESPN+		Albany; Albany Cup	L 51–86	1–5	MVP Arena (7,605); Albany, NY
December 1, 2023; 7:00 p.m., ESPN+		Rider	W 67–65	2–5 (1–0)	MVP Arena (5,216); Albany, NY
December 3, 2023; 1:00 p.m., ESPN+		at Mount St. Mary's	L 48–80	2–6 (1–1)	Knott Arena (1,863); Emmitsburg, MD
December 6, 2023*; 7:00 p.m., ESPN+		Bryant	L 51–67	2–7	MVP Arena (4,233); Albany, NY
December 9, 2023*; 4:00 p.m., ESPN+		at St. Bonaventure; Franciscan Cup	L 56–89	2–8	Reilly Center (4,022); St. Bonaventure, NY
December 19, 2023*; 7:00 p.m., ESPN+		Cornell	L 74–95	2–9	MVP Arena (4,902); Albany, NY
December 22, 2023*; 2:00 p.m., ESPN+		at Brown	L 67–71	2–10	Pizzitola Sports Center (611); Providence, RI
December 30, 2023*; 1:00 p.m., NESN/ESPN+		at UMass	L 66–79	2–11	Mullins Center (4,036); Amherst, MA
January 5, 2024; 7:00 p.m., ESPN+		Fairfield	L 69–93	2–12 (1–2)	MVP Arena (4,931); Albany, NY
January 12, 2024; 7:00 p.m., ESPN+		at Canisius	L 63–67	2–13 (1–3)	Koessler Athletic Center (574); Buffalo, NY
January 15, 2024; 12:00 p.m., ESPN+		at Niagara	W 93–88	3–13 (2–3)	Gallagher Center (724); Lewiston, NY
January 19, 2024; 7:00 p.m., ESPN+		Quinnipiac	L 70–82	3–14 (2–4)	MVP Arena (4,845); Albany, NY
January 21, 2024; 2:00 p.m., ESPN+		at Marist	L 48–50	3–15 (2–5)	McCann Arena (1,886); Poughkeepsie, NY
January 26, 2024; 7:00 p.m., ESPN+		Iona	L 51–70	3–16 (2–6)	MVP Arena (5,100); Albany, NY
January 28, 2024; 2:00 p.m., ESPN+		Saint Peter's	L 52–63	3–17 (2–7)	MVP Arena (5,806); Albany, NY
February 2, 2024; 7:00 p.m., ESPN+		at Rider	L 50–91	3–18 (2–8)	Alumni Gymnasium (1,650); Lawrenceville, NJ
February 4, 2024; 2:00 p.m., ESPN+		Mount St. Mary's	L 61–68	3–19 (2–9)	MVP Arena (5,730); Albany, NY
February 8, 2024; 7:00 p.m., ESPN+		Marist	L 51–67	3–20 (2–10)	MVP Arena (5,218); Albany, NY
February 10, 2024; 7:00 p.m., ESPN+		at Manhattan	W 68–63	4–20 (3–10)	Draddy Gymnasium (707); Riverdale, NY
February 16, 2024; 7:00 p.m., ESPN+		at Saint Peter's	L 53–75	4–21 (3–11)	Run Baby Run Arena (563); Jersey City, NJ
February 18, 2024; 2:00 p.m., ESPN+		Canisius	L 64–73	4–22 (3–12)	MVP Arena (4,931); Albany, NY
February 25, 2024; 2:00 p.m., ESPN+		at Fairfield	L 64–88	4–23 (3–13)	Leo D. Mahoney Arena (3,561); Fairfield, CT
March 1, 2024; 7:00 p.m., ESPN+		Manhattan	L 68–70	4–24 (3–14)	MVP Arena (4,832); Albany, NY
March 3, 2024; 2:00 p.m., ESPN+		at Quinnipiac	L 57–71	4–25 (3–15)	M&T Bank Arena (1,995); Hamden, CT
March 7, 2024; 7:00 p.m., ESPN+		Niagara	L 59–66	4–26 (3–16)	MVP Arena (4,817); Albany, NY
March 9, 2024; 1:00 p.m., ESPN+		at Iona	L 54–68	4–27 (3–17)	Hynes Athletics Center (1,884); New Rochelle, NY
MAAC tournament
March 12, 2024; 9:45 p.m., ESPN+	(11)	vs. (6) Niagara; First round	L 65–67	4–28	Boardwalk Hall (1,717); Atlantic City, NJ
*Non-conference game. ^{#}Rankings from AP poll. (#) Tournament seedings in parentheses. All times are in Eastern.
