= 2023–24 Canisius Golden Griffins men's basketball team =

American college basketball season

2023–24 Canisius Golden Griffins men's basketball
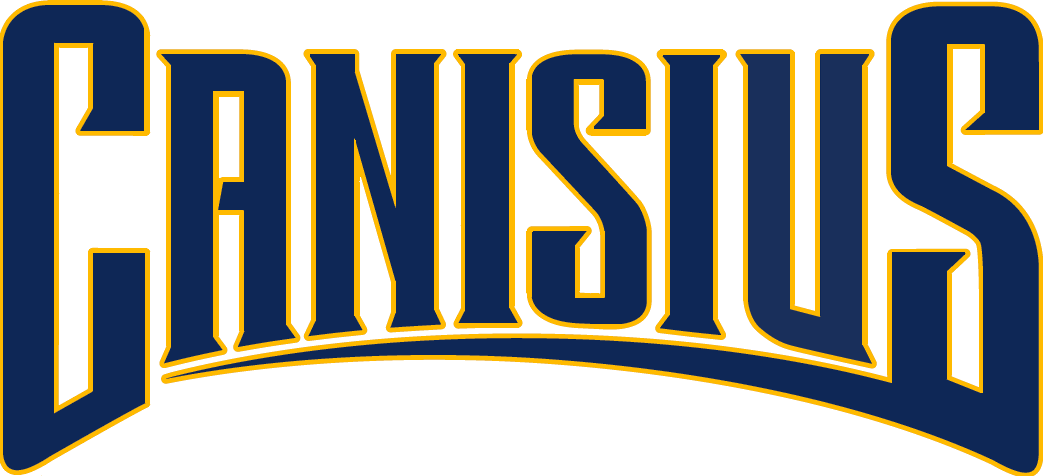
- Conference: Metro Atlantic Athletic Conference
- Record: 14–18 (8–12 MAAC)
- Head coach: Reggie Witherspoon (8th season)
- Assistant coaches: Chris Hawkins; Thurman Schaetzle; Gravelle Craig
- Home arena: Koessler Athletic Center

2023–24 MAAC men's basketball standings
	Conf.				Overall
Team	W		L	PCT	W		L	PCT
Quinnipiac	15	–	5	.750	24	–	10	.706
Fairfield	14	–	6	.700	24	–	13	.649
Marist	12	–	8	.600	18	–	13	.581
Rider	12	–	8	.600	15	–	17	.469
Saint Peter's †	12	–	8	.600	19	–	14	.576
Niagara	11	–	9	.550	16	–	16	.500
Iona	10	–	10	.500	16	–	17	.485
Mount St. Mary's	9	–	11	.450	13	–	19	.406
Canisius	8	–	12	.400	14	–	18	.438
Manhattan	4	–	16	.200	7	–	23	.233
Siena	3	–	17	.150	4	–	28	.125
† 2024 MAAC tournament winner

The 2023–24 Canisius Golden Griffins men's basketball team represented Canisius University in the 2023–24 NCAA Division I men's basketball season. The Golden Griffins, led by eighth-year head coach Reggie Witherspoon, played their home games at the Koessler Athletic Center in Buffalo, New York as members of the Metro Atlantic Athletic Conference.

== Previous season ==
The Golden Griffins finished the 2022–23 season 10–20, 8–12 in MAAC play to finish tied for eighth place. As the No. 9 seed, they were defeated in overtime by Mount St. Mary's in the first round of the MAAC tournament.

== Roster ==
2023–24 Canisius Golden Griffins men's basketball team
Players
Coaches

Pos.	#	Name	Height	Weight	Year	Hometown
G	0	Tre Dinkins	6 ft 2 in (1.88 m)	190 lb (86 kg)	Jr	Chester, Pennsylvania
G	1	Devean Williams	6 ft 3 in (1.91 m)	180 lb (82 kg)	So	Los Angeles, California
F	2	TJ Porter	6 ft 8 in (2.03 m)	215 lb (98 kg)	Jr	Atlanta, Georgia
G	3	Cam Palesse	6 ft 5 in (1.96 m)	195 lb (88 kg)	So	Waukesha, Wisconsin
F	4	Youri Fritz	6 ft 9 in (2.06 m)	190 lb (86 kg)	So	Tiel, Netherlands
G	5	Siem Uijtendaal	6 ft 6 in (1.98 m)	185 lb (84 kg)	Sr	Haarlem, Netherlands
G	11	Davon Ware	5 ft 10 in (1.78 m)	170 lb (77 kg)	GS	Buffalo, New York
F	12	Bryce Okpoh	6 ft 7 in (2.01 m)	190 lb (86 kg)	Sr	Dallas, Texas
F	15	Joe Jones III	6 ft 10 in (2.08 m)	230 lb (104 kg)	GS	Buffalo, New York
G	21	TJ Gadsden	6 ft 7 in (2.01 m)	195 lb (88 kg)	Jr	New York, New York
F	23	Frank Mitchell	6 ft 8 in (2.03 m)	240 lb (109 kg)	Jr	Toronto, Ontario
F	25	Xzavier Long	6 ft 7 in (2.01 m)	190 lb (86 kg)	Jr	Washington, D.C.
F	32	Maji David-Maji	6 ft 5 in (1.96 m)	245 lb (111 kg)	So	Kogi, Nigeria
G	33	Nicco DiGiulio	5 ft 10 in (1.78 m)	155 lb (70 kg)	Fr	Williamsville, New York
G	44	Tahj Staveskie	6 ft 0 in (1.83 m)	165 lb (75 kg)	So	Sandusky, Ohio

Head coach

- Reggie Witherspoon (Wheeling)

Assistant coach(es)

- Chris Hawkins (Radford)
- Thurman Schaetzle (Canisius)
- Gravelle Craig (Cleveland State)

Legend

- (C) Team captain
- (S) Suspended
- (I) Ineligible
- (W) Walk-on
- Injured
- Current redshirt

Roster
Last update: November 12, 2023

== Schedule and results ==
Date time, TV	Rank^{#}	Opponent^{#}	Result	Record	Site (attendance) city, state
Exhibition
October 21, 2023*; 6:00 p.m.		Toronto Metropolitan	W 97–74		Koessler Athletic Center (418); Buffalo, NY
Regular season
November 8, 2023*; 7:00 p.m., ESPN+		at Syracuse	L 77–89	0–1	JMA Wireless Dome (19,080); Syracuse, NY
November 12, 2022*; 4:00 p.m., ESPN+		at St. Bonaventure	W 70–67	1–1	Reilly Center (4,850); Olean, NY
November 15, 2023*; 7:00 p.m., ESPN+		at Cleveland State	L 61–71	1–2	Wolstein Center (1,732); Cleveland, OH
November 20, 2023*; 7:30 p.m., ESPN+		D'Youville	W 109–69	2–2	Koessler Athletic Center (878); Buffalo, NY
November 24, 2023*; 4:30 p.m.		vs. Wofford; Northern Classic	W 76–67	3–2	Place Bell; Laval, Quebec
November 25, 2023*; 2:00 p.m.		vs. Western Kentucky; Northern Classic	W 85–77	4–2	Place Bell; Laval, Quebec
November 26, 2023*; 4:00 p.m.		vs. Bowling Green; Northern Classic	L 73–77	4–3	Place Bell; Laval, Quebec
December 1, 2023; 7:00 p.m., ESPN+		Quinnipiac	W 93–73	5–3 (1–0)	Koessler Athletic Center (1,084); Buffalo, NY
December 3, 2023; 1:00 p.m., ESPN+		Saint Peter's	L 52–54	5–4 (1–1)	Koessler Athletic Center (795); Buffalo, NY
December 6, 2023*; 12:00 p.m., ESPN+		Robert Morris	W 87–80	6–4	Koessler Athletic Center (562); Buffalo, NY
December 9, 2023*; 6:00 p.m., ACCNX		at Pittsburgh	L 71–82	6–5	Petersen Events Center (7,808); Pittsburgh, PA
December 22, 2023*; 7:00 p.m., ESPN+		at High Point	L 70–78	6–6	Qubein Center (2,855); High Point, NC
January 5, 2024; 7:00 p.m., ESPN+		at Mount St. Mary's	L 69–74	6–7 (1–2)	Knott Arena (1,307); Emmitsburg, MD
January 7, 2024; 2:00 p.m., ESPN+		at Rider	L 76–79 ^{OT}	6–8 (1–3)	Alumni Gymnasium (1,565); Lawrenceville, NJ
January 12, 2024; 7:00 p.m., ESPN+		Siena	W 67–63	7–8 (2–3)	Koessler Athletic Center (574); Buffalo, NY
January 15, 2023; 12:00 p.m., ESPN+		Fairfield	L 63–88	7–9 (2–4)	Koessler Athletic Center (528); Buffalo, NY
January 19, 2024; 7:00 p.m., ESPN+		at Iona	L 58–70	7–10 (2–5)	Hynes Athletics Center (1,482); New Rochelle, NY
January 21, 2024; 2:00 p.m., ESPN+		at Saint Peter's	L 59–70	7–11 (2–6)	Run Baby Run Arena; Jersey City, NJ
January 26, 2024; 7:00 p.m., ESPN+		Manhattan	W 82–70	8–11 (3–6)	Koessler Athletic Center (899); Buffalo, NY
January 28, 2024; 1:00 p.m., ESPN+		Marist	L 71–80	8–12 (3–7)	Koessler Athletic Center (620); Buffalo, NY
February 4, 2024; 2:00 p.m., ESPN+		at Quinnipiac	L 63–88	8–13 (3–8)	M&T Bank Arena (1,747); Hamden, CT
February 6, 2024; 7:00 p.m., ESPN+		at Niagara; Battle of the Bridge	L 64–69	8–14 (3–9)	Gallagher Center (1,295); Lewiston, NY
February 10, 2024; 1:00 p.m., ESPN+		Iona	W 73–69	9–14 (4–9)	Koessler Athletic Center (621); Buffalo, NY
February 16, 2024; 7:00 p.m., ESPN+		at Marist	L 55–78	9–15 (4–10)	McCann Arena (1,667); Poughkeepsie, NY
February 18, 2023; 2:00 p.m., ESPN+		at Siena	W 73–64	10–15 (5–10)	MVP Arena (4,931); Albany, NY
February 23, 2024; 7:00 p.m., ESPN+		Niagara; Battle of the Bridge	W 69–59	11–15 (6–10)	Koessler Athletic Center (1,501); Buffalo, NY
March 1, 2024; 7:00 p.m., ESPN+		Mount St. Mary's	W 61–56	12–15 (7–10)	Koessler Athletic Center (914); Buffalo, NY
March 3, 2024; 1:00 p.m., ESPN+		Rider	L 61–65	12–16 (7–11)	Koessler Athletic Center (788); Buffalo, NY
March 7, 2024; 7:00 p.m., ESPN+		at Fairfield	L 62–74	12–17 (7–12)	Leo D. Mahoney Arena (1,929); Fairfield, CT
March 9, 2023; 4:00 p.m., ESPN+		at Manhattan	W 73–70 ^{OT}	13–17 (8–12)	Draddy Gymnasium (950); Riverdale, NY
MAAC tournament
March 12, 2024; 5:15 pm, ESPN+	(9)	vs. (8) Mount St. Mary's; First round	W 77–61	14–17	Jim Whelan Boardwalk Hall; Atlantic City, NJ
March 13, 2024; 6:30 pm, ESPN+	(9)	vs. (1) Quinnipiac; Quarterfinals	L 52–76	14–18	Jim Whelan Boardwalk Hall (1,443); Atlantic City, NJ
*Non-conference game. ^{#}Rankings from AP Poll. (#) Tournament seedings in parentheses. All times are in Eastern.
