= 2023–24 Iona Gaels men's basketball team =

American college basketball season

2023–24 Iona Gaels men's basketball
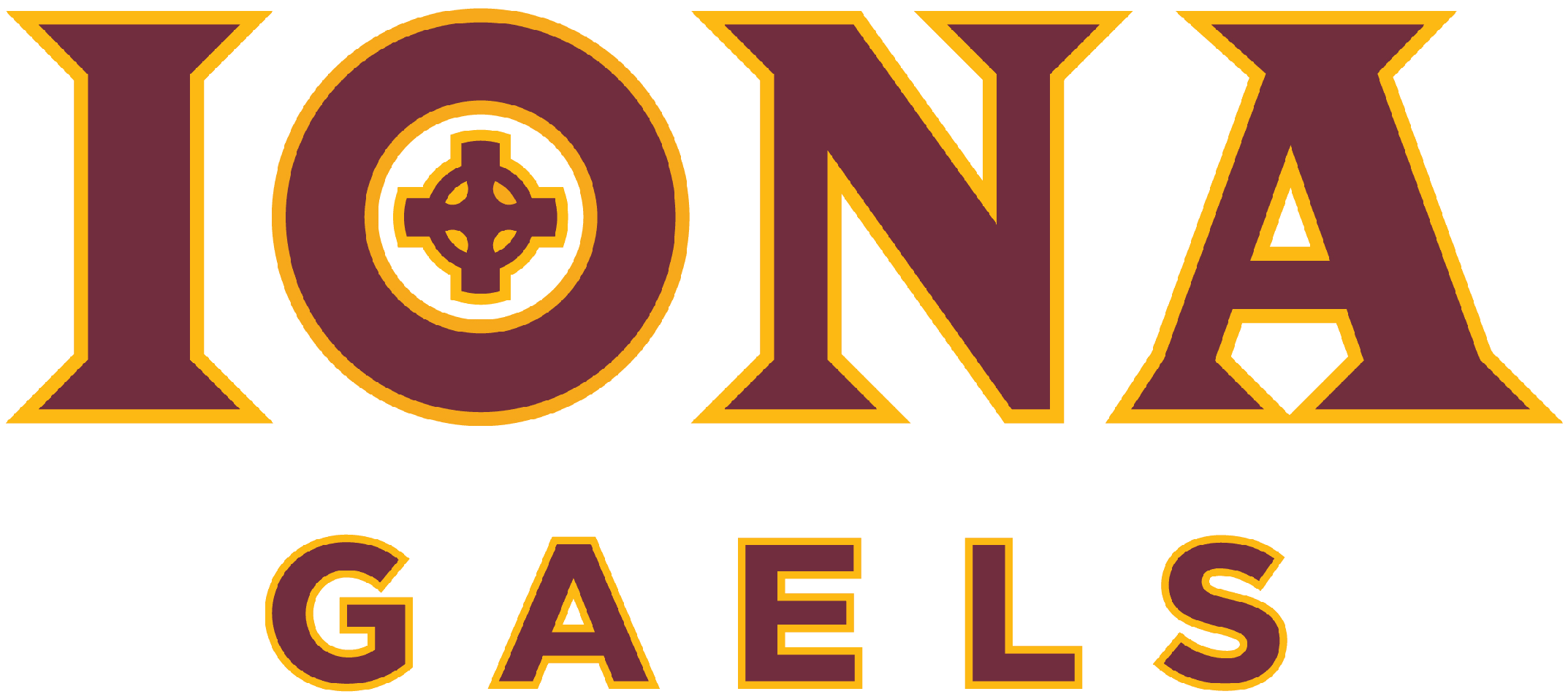
- Conference: Metro Atlantic Athletic Conference
- Record: 16–17 (10–10 MAAC)
- Head coach: Tobin Anderson (1st season)
- Assistant coaches: Tom Bonacum; Kam Murrell; Patrick Wallace
- Home arena: Hynes Athletics Center

2023–24 MAAC men's basketball standings
	Conf.				Overall
Team	W		L	PCT	W		L	PCT
Quinnipiac	15	–	5	.750	24	–	10	.706
Fairfield	14	–	6	.700	24	–	13	.649
Marist	12	–	8	.600	18	–	13	.581
Rider	12	–	8	.600	15	–	17	.469
Saint Peter's †	12	–	8	.600	19	–	14	.576
Niagara	11	–	9	.550	16	–	16	.500
Iona	10	–	10	.500	16	–	17	.485
Mount St. Mary's	9	–	11	.450	13	–	19	.406
Canisius	8	–	12	.400	14	–	18	.438
Manhattan	4	–	16	.200	7	–	23	.233
Siena	3	–	17	.150	4	–	28	.125
† 2024 MAAC tournament winner

The 2023–24 Iona Gaels men's basketball team represented Iona University during the 2023-24 NCAA Division I men's basketball season. The Gaels, led by first-year head coach Tobin Anderson, played their home games at the Hynes Athletics Center located in New Rochelle, New York as members of the Metro Atlantic Athletic Conference.

== Previous season ==
The Gaels finished the 2022–23 season 27–8, 17–3 in MAAC play to finish as MAAC regular season champions. They defeated Mount St. Mary's, Niagara, and Marist to win the MAAC tournament championship and earn the conference's automatic bid to the NCAA tournament as the No. 13 seed in the West region. There, they lost in the first round to eventual national champions UConn.

On March 20, 2023, head coach Rick Pitino left the team to accept the head coaching job at St. John's. The next day, the school named Fairleigh Dickinson head coach Tobin Anderson the team's new head coach.

== Roster ==
2023–24 Iona Gaels men's basketball team
Players
Coaches

Pos.	#	Name	Height	Weight	Year	Hometown
F	0	Isaac Brice	6 ft 6 in (1.98 m)	205 lb (93 kg)	So	Picayune, Mississippi
G/F	1	Wheza Panzo	6 ft 7 in (2.01 m)	205 lb (93 kg)	GS	Mississauga, Ontario
G/F	2	Greg Gordon	6 ft 5 in (1.96 m)	210 lb (95 kg)	Jr	Chicago, Illinois
G	3	Jeremiah Quigley	5 ft 11 in (1.8 m)	160 lb (73 kg)	Fr	Accokeek, Maryland
G	4	Jean Aranguren	6 ft 3 in (1.91 m)	190 lb (86 kg)	Fr	Valencia, Venezuela
G	5	Joel Brown	6 ft 2 in (1.88 m)	190 lb (86 kg)	GS	Brampton, Ontario
G	7	Idan Tretout	6 ft 4 in (1.93 m)	200 lb (91 kg)	GS	Brooklyn, New York
F	10	Terrell Williams Jr.	6 ft 6 in (1.98 m)	215 lb (98 kg)	GS	Dallas, Texas
F	11	Sultan Adewale	6 ft 7 in (2.01 m)	225 lb (102 kg)	Fr	East London, England
G	13	Alex Bates IV	6 ft 5 in (1.96 m)	190 lb (86 kg)	Fr	Charlotte, North Carolina
F	23	Dylan Saunders	6 ft 8 in (2.03 m)	210 lb (95 kg)	Fr	Roanoke, Virginia
G	25	Rohan Chappali	5 ft 10 in (1.78 m)	155 lb (70 kg)	Fr	Ashburn, Virginia
F	55	Osborn Shema	7 ft 0 in (2.13 m)	220 lb (100 kg)	GS	Kanombe, Rwanda
G	77	Rodrigo Farias	6 ft 1 in (1.85 m)	155 lb (70 kg)	Fr	Flushing, New York

Head coach

- Tobin Anderson (Wesleyan)

Assistant coach(es)

- Tom Bonacum (Ramapo)
- Kam Murrell (Memphis)
- Patrick Wallace (Charleston Southern)

Legend

- (C) Team captain
- (S) Suspended
- (I) Ineligible
- (W) Walk-on
- Injured
- Current redshirt

Roster
Last update: November 22, 2023

== Schedule and results ==
Date time, TV	Rank^{#}	Opponent^{#}	Result	Record	Site (attendance) city, state
Regular season
November 6, 2023*; 7:00 pm, FloHoops		at Charleston	L 69–71	0–1	TD Arena (5,265); Charleston, SC
November 10, 2023*; 7:00 pm, ESPN+		Sacred Heart	W 88–81	1–1	Hynes Athletics Center (2,401); New Rochelle, NY
November 20, 2023*; 11:00 am, FloHoops		vs. High Point; Gulf Coast Showcase first round	L 68–82	1–2	Hertz Arena (234); Estero, FL
November 21, 2023*; 11:00 am, FloHoops		vs. Long Beach State; Gulf Coast Showcase consolation 2nd round	L 76–80	1–3	Hertz Arena (201); Estero, FL
November 22, 2023*; 11:00 am, FloHoops		vs. Buffalo; Gulf Coast Showcase 7th place game	W 89–64	2–3	Hertz Arena (213); Estero, FL
November 26, 2023*; 2:00 pm, P12N		at No. 18 Colorado	L 68–85	2–4	CU Events Center (6,346); Boulder, CO
November 29, 2023; 7:00 pm, ESPN+		Marist	L 64–68	2–5 (0–1)	Hynes Athletics Center (1,845); New Rochelle, NY
December 1, 2023; 7:00 pm, ESPN+		at Fairfield	W 78–67	3–5 (1–1)	Leo D. Mahoney Arena (2,640); Fairfield, CT
December 6, 2023*; 7:00 pm, ESPN+		Hofstra	L 57–62	3–6	Hynes Athletics Center (1,744); New Rochelle, NY
December 10, 2023*; 5:00 pm, ESPN+		Saint Francis	W 61–54	4–6	Hynes Athletics Center (1,288); New Rochelle, NY
December 16, 2023*; 7:00 pm, FloHoops		vs. Saint Joseph's; Holiday Hoopfest	L 58–83	4–7	UBS Arena (3,877); Elmont, NY
December 21, 2023*; 7:00 pm, ESPN+		Colgate	W 85–65	5–7	Hynes Athletics Center (1,818); New Rochelle, NY
December 30, 2023*; 2:00 pm, ESPN+		at Harvard	W 69–60	6–7	Lavietes Pavilion (1,636); Cambridge, MA
January 5, 2024; 7:00 pm, ESPN+		at Saint Peter's	L 57–69	6–8 (1–2)	Run Baby Run Arena (602); Jersey City, NJ
January 7, 2024; 1:00 pm, ESPN+		Niagara	L 73–75	6–9 (1–3)	Hynes Athletics Center (2,001); New Rochelle, NY
January 14, 2024; 1:00 pm, ESPN+		Mount St. Mary's	W 87–70	7–9 (2–3)	Hynes Athletics Center (1,434); New Rochelle, NY
January 19, 2024; 7:00 pm, ESPN+		Canisius	W 70-58	8–9 (3–3)	Hynes Athletics Center (1,482); New Rochelle, NY
January 21, 2024; 2:00 pm, ESPN+		at Quinnipiac	L 87-91	8–10 (3–4)	M&T Bank Arena (1,631); Hamden, CT
January 26, 2024; 7:00 pm, ESPN+		at Siena	W 70–51	9–10 (4–4)	MVP Arena (5,100); Albany, NY
February 2, 2024; 7:00 pm, ESPN+		Fairfield	W 91–82	10–10 (5–4)	Hynes Athletics Center (1,888); New Rochelle, NY
February 4, 2024; 1:00 pm, ESPN+		Rider	W 94–93	11–10 (6–4)	Hynes Athletics Center (1,669); New Rochelle, NY
February 8, 2024; 7:00 pm, ESPN+		at Niagara	W 74–71	12–10 (7–4)	Gallagher Center (1,041); Lewiston, NY
February 10, 2024; 1:00 pm, ESPN+		at Canisius	L 69–73	12–11 (7–5)	Koessler Athletic Center (621); Buffalo, NY
February 16, 2024; 7:00 pm, ESPNU/ESPN+		Manhattan	W 73–63	13–11 (8–5)	Hynes Athletics Center (1,862); New Rochelle, NY
February 18, 2024; 1:00 pm, ESPN+		Saint Peter's	L 53–59	13–12 (8–6)	Hynes Athletics Center (1,808); New Rochelle, NY
February 23, 2024; 7:00 pm, ESPN+		at Rider	L 75–78	13–13 (8–7)	Alumni Gymnasium (1,650); Lawrenceville, NJ
February 25, 2024; 2:00 pm, ESPN+		at Mount St. Mary's	L 65–72	13–14 (8–8)	Knott Arena (1,387); Emmitsburg, MD
March 1, 2024; 7:00 pm, ESPN+		Quinnipiac	L 64–82	13–15 (8–9)	Hynes Athletics Center (1,846); New Rochelle, NY
March 3, 2024; 2:00 pm, ESPN+		at Marist	W 71–64	14–15 (9–9)	McCann Arena (1,762); Poughkeepsie, NY
March 7, 2024; 7:00 pm, ESPN+		at Manhattan	L 60–77	14–16 (9–10)	Draddy Gymnasium (812); Riverdale, NY
March 9, 2024; 1:00 pm, ESPN+		Siena	W 68–54	15–16 (10–10)	Hynes Athletics Center (1,884); New Rochelle, NY
MAAC Tournament
March 12, 2024; 7:30 pm, ESPN+	(7)	vs. (10) Manhattan; First round	W 60–57	16–16	Boardwalk Hall; Atlantic City, NJ
March 13, 2024; 9:00 pm, ESPN+	(7)	vs. (2) Fairfield; First round	L 63–68	16–17	Boardwalk Hall (1,443); Atlantic City, NJ
*Non-conference game. ^{#}Rankings from AP Poll. (#) Tournament seedings in parentheses. All times are in Eastern.
