= 2023–24 Mount St. Mary's Mountaineers men's basketball team =

Basketball team season

2023–24 Mount St. Mary's Mountaineers men's basketball
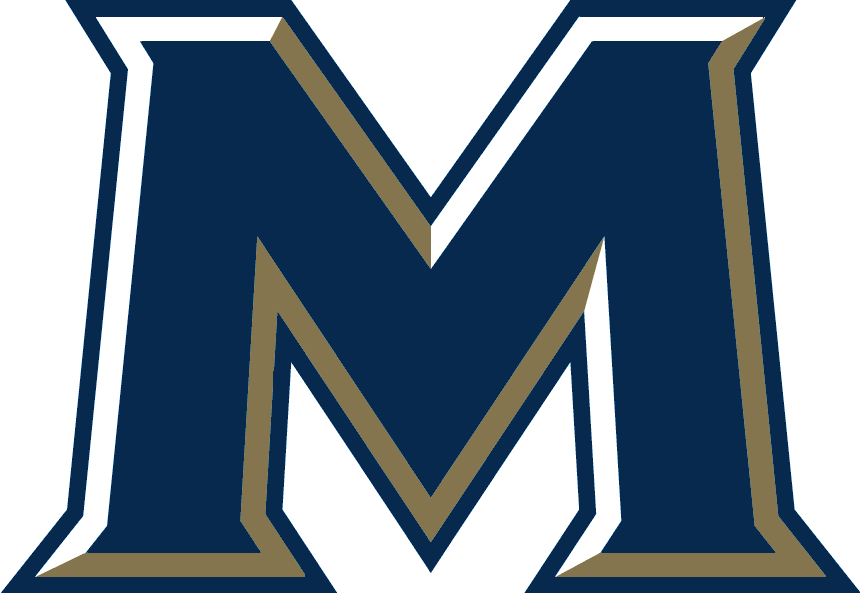
- Conference: Metro Atlantic Athletic Conference
- Record: 13–19 (9–11 MAAC)
- Head coach: Dan Engelstad (6th season)
- Associate head coach: Will Holland
- Assistant coaches: Justin Burrell; Jeremy Freeman
- Home arena: Knott Arena

2023–24 MAAC men's basketball standings
	Conf.				Overall
Team	W		L	PCT	W		L	PCT
Quinnipiac	15	–	5	.750	24	–	10	.706
Fairfield	14	–	6	.700	24	–	13	.649
Marist	12	–	8	.600	18	–	13	.581
Rider	12	–	8	.600	15	–	17	.469
Saint Peter's †	12	–	8	.600	19	–	14	.576
Niagara	11	–	9	.550	16	–	16	.500
Iona	10	–	10	.500	16	–	17	.485
Mount St. Mary's	9	–	11	.450	13	–	19	.406
Canisius	8	–	12	.400	14	–	18	.438
Manhattan	4	–	16	.200	7	–	23	.233
Siena	3	–	17	.150	4	–	28	.125
† 2024 MAAC tournament winner

The 2023–24 Mount St. Mary's Mountaineers men's basketball team represented Mount St. Mary's University during the 2023–24 NCAA Division I men's basketball season. The Mountaineers, led by sixth-year head coach Dan Engelstad, played their home games at Knott Arena in Emmitsburg, Maryland as members of the Metro Atlantic Athletic Conference (MAAC).

The Mountaineers finished the season 13–19, 9–11 in MAAC play, to finish in eighth place. They were defeated by Canisius in the first round of the MAAC tournament.

On April 10, 2024, it was announced that head coach Dan Engelstad would be resigning from his position as head coach after six seasons, in order to take an assistant coaching position at Syracuse. On April 20, the school announced that they would be hiring UNC Greensboro assistant coach Donny Lind as the team's next head coach.

== Previous season ==
The Mountaineers finished the 2022–23 season 13–20, 8–12 in MAAC play, to finish in a tie for ninth place. In the MAAC tournament, they defeated Canisius in the first round before falling to top-seeded and eventual tournament champions Iona in the quarterfinals.

== Roster ==
2023–24 Mount St. Mary's Mountaineers men's basketball team
Players
Coaches

Pos.	#	Name	Height	Weight	Year	Previous school	Hometown
G	1	Dakota Leffew	6 ft 5 in (1.96 m)	185 lb (84 kg)	Sr	Jonesboro HS	Hampton, GA
G	2	De'Shayne Montgomery	6 ft 4 in (1.93 m)	190 lb (86 kg)	Fr	Hargrave Military Academy	Fort Lauderdale, FL
F	3	Jonathan Ogunfuye	6 ft 7 in (2.01 m)	190 lb (86 kg)	Fr	Spire Academy	Houston, TX
F	4	Dola Adebayo	6 ft 8 in (2.03 m)	210 lb (95 kg)	RS So	Canterbury School	Fort Myers, FL
G	5	Malcolm Dread	6 ft 4 in (1.93 m)	210 lb (95 kg)	So	Richmond	Detroit, MI
G	10	Patrick Haigh	6 ft 4 in (1.93 m)	190 lb (86 kg)	Fr	Bishop Guilfoyle HS	Altoona, PA
F	11	George Tinsley	6 ft 6 in (1.98 m)	210 lb (95 kg)	GS	Binghamton	Clarks Summit, PA
F	12	Jedy Cordilia	6 ft 9 in (2.06 m)	210 lb (95 kg)	Jr	West Nottingham Academy	Tilburg, Netherlands
G	13	Dallas Hobbs	6 ft 1 in (1.85 m)	160 lb (73 kg)	Fr	Dynamic Prep	Dallas, TX
F	15	Terrell Jr. Ard	6 ft 7 in (2.01 m)	200 lb (91 kg)	GS	Presbyterian	Marietta, GA
F	21	Ron Jessamy	6 ft 8 in (2.03 m)	210 lb (95 kg)	Fr	Palmetto Ridge HS	Clarksville, TN
G	23	Joshua Reaves	6 ft 4 in (1.93 m)	205 lb (93 kg)	Sr	South Kent School	Hamden, CT
F	24	František Barton	6 ft 7 in (2.01 m)	210 lb (95 kg)	Sr	Get Better Academy	Brno, Czech Republic
G	25	Joshua Olaosebikan	6 ft 1 in (1.85 m)	185 lb (84 kg)	Jr	North Point HS	Waldorf, MD
G	45	Xavier Lipscomb	6 ft 2 in (1.88 m)	195 lb (88 kg)	Jr	Radford	Washington, D.C.

Head coach

- Dan Engelstad (St. Mary's (MD))

Assistant coach(es)

- Will Holland (Mount St. Mary's)
- Justin Burrell (Holy Cross)
- Jeremy Freeman (Cornell)

Legend

- (C) Team captain
- (S) Suspended
- (I) Ineligible
- (W) Walk-on
- Injured
- Current redshirt

Roster
Last update: October 23, 2023

== Schedule and results ==
Date time, TV	Rank^{#}	Opponent^{#}	Result	Record	Site (attendance) city, state
Exhibition
October 28, 2023*; 4:00 p.m.		Bucknell; Behan Strong Exhibition Game	W 72–67 ^{2OT}		Knott Arena (850); Emmitsburg, MD
Regular season
November 7, 2023*; 7:00 p.m., B1G+		at Maryland	L 53–68	0–1	Xfinity Center (14,044); College Park, MD
November 11, 2023*; 4:00 p.m., ESPN+		Coppin State	W 74–60	1–1	Knott Arena (2,206); Emmitsburg, MD
November 18, 2023*; 12:00 p.m., Fox 5 Plus		at Georgetown; Georgetown MTE	L 72–83	1–2	Capital One Arena (4,648); Washington, D.C.
November 22, 2023*; 4:30 p.m., ESPN+		at American; Georgetown MTE	L 65–68	1–3	Bender Arena (584); Washington, D.C.
November 25, 2023*; 4:00 p.m., ESPN+		Howard	L 83–87 ^{2OT}	1–4	Knott Arena (1,215); Emmitsburg, MD
December 1, 2023; 7:00 p.m., ESPN+		at Manhattan	L 74–75 ^{OT}	1–5 (0–1)	Draddy Gymnasium (1,097); Riverdale, NY
December 3, 2023; 1:00 p.m., ESPN+		Siena	W 80–48	2–5 (1–1)	Knott Arena (1,863); Emmitsburg, MD
December 5, 2023*; 8:00 p.m., SECN+		at Ole Miss	L 68–77	2–6	SJB Pavilion (6,950); Oxford, MS
December 9, 2023*; 5:00 p.m., ESPN+		at Loyola (MD)	W 77–64	3–6	Reitz Arena (821); Baltimore, MD
December 15, 2023*; 7:00 p.m.		at Saint Francis (PA)	W 72–65	4–6	DeGol Arena (502); Loretto, PA
December 20, 2023*; 7:00 p.m., SECN+		at Georgia	L 82–94	4–7	Stegeman Coliseum (6,045); Athens, GA
December 23, 2023*; 1:00 p.m., ESPN+		LIU	W 87–59	5–7	Knott Arena (1,782); Emmitsburg, MD
December 30, 2023*; 12:00 p.m.		at Delaware State	L 73–77	5–8	Memorial Hall (550); Dover, DE
January 5, 2024; 7:00 p.m., ESPN+		Canisius	W 74–69	6–8 (2–1)	Knott Arena (1,307); Emmitsburg, MD
January 7, 2024; 2:00 p.m., ESPN+		at Saint Peter's	L 64–70	6–9 (2–2)	Run Baby Run Arena (426); Jersey City, NJ
January 14, 2024; 1:00 p.m., ESPN+		at Iona	L 70–87	6–10 (2–3)	Hynes Athletics Center (1,434); New Rochelle, NY
January 19, 2024; 7:00 p.m., ESPN+		Marist	W 65–48	7–10 (3–3)	Knott Arena (1,808); Emmitsburg, MD
January 21, 2024; 2:00 p.m., ESPN+		Niagara	L 71–82	7–11 (3–4)	Knott Arena (2,412); Emmitsburg, MD
January 25, 2024; 7:30 p.m., ESPN+		at Quinnipiac	L 65–79	7–12 (3–5)	M&T Bank Arena (929); Hamden, CT
January 27, 2024; 5:00 p.m., ESPN+		Rider	L 62–66	7–13 (3–6)	Knott Arena (2,965); Emmitsburg, MD
February 2, 2024; 7:00 p.m., ESPN+		at Marist	W 76–58	8–13 (4–6)	McCann Arena (1,360); Poughkeepsie, NY
February 4, 2024; 2:00 p.m., ESPN+		at Siena	W 68–61	9–13 (5–6)	MVP Arena (5,730); Albany, NY
February 8, 2024; 7:00 p.m., ESPN+		Manhattan	W 82–78	10–13 (6–6)	Knott Arena (2,270); Emmitsburg, MD
February 10, 2024; 4:00 p.m., ESPN+		Quinnipiac	W 96–79	11–13 (7–6)	Knott Arena (2,166); Emmitsburg, MD
February 16, 2024; 7:00 p.m., ESPN+		at Rider	L 57–61	11–14 (7–7)	Alumni Gymnasium (1,587); Lawrenceville, NJ
February 18, 2024; 2:00 p.m., ESPN+		at Fairfield	L 80–94	11–15 (7–8)	Leo D. Mahoney Arena (2,327); Fairfield, CT
February 23, 2024; 7:00 p.m., ESPN+		Saint Peter's	L 65–70	11–16 (7–9)	Knott Arena (2,061); Emmitsburg, MD
February 25, 2024; 2:00 p.m., ESPN+		Iona	W 72–65	12–16 (8–9)	Knott Arena (1,387); Emmitsburg, MD
March 1, 2024; 7:00 p.m., ESPN+		at Canisius	L 56–61	12–17 (8–10)	Koessler Athletic Center (914); Buffalo, NY
March 3, 2024; 2:00 p.m., ESPN+		at Niagara	W 91–72	13–17 (9–10)	Gallagher Center (1,077); Lewiston, NY
March 9, 2024; 4:00 p.m., ESPN+		Fairfield	L 92–96	13–18 (9–11)	Knott Arena (2,790); Emmitsburg, MD
MAAC tournament
March 12, 2024; 5:15 p.m., ESPN+	(8)	vs. (9) Canisius; First round	L 61–77	13–19	Boardwalk Hall; Atlantic City, NJ
*Non-conference game. ^{#}Rankings from AP poll. (#) Tournament seedings in parentheses. All times are in Eastern.
