= 2023–24 Rider Broncs men's basketball team =

American college basketball season

2023–24 Rider Broncs men's basketball
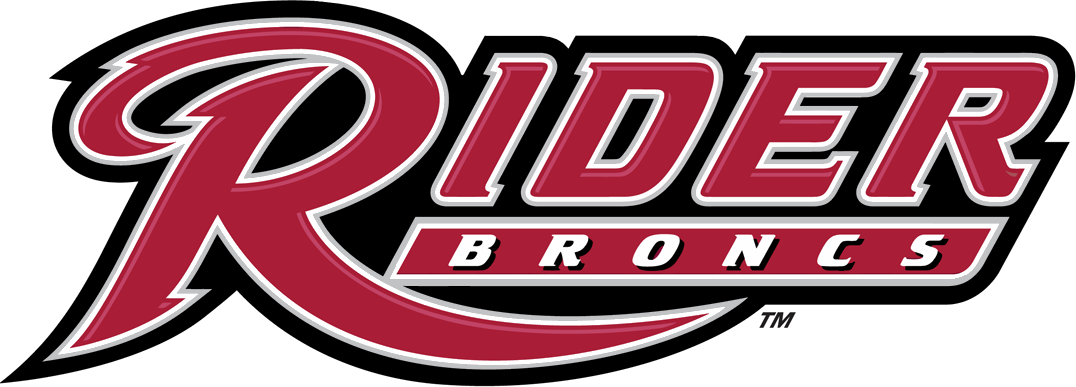
- Conference: Metro Atlantic Athletic Conference
- Record: 15–17 (12–8 MAAC)
- Head coach: Kevin Baggett (12th season)
- Associate head coach: Dino Presley
- Assistant coaches: Geoff Arnold; Kim Waiters; Jason Thompson; Garrett Collins
- Home arena: Alumni Gymnasium

2023–24 MAAC men's basketball standings
	Conf.				Overall
Team	W		L	PCT	W		L	PCT
Quinnipiac	15	–	5	.750	24	–	10	.706
Fairfield	14	–	6	.700	24	–	13	.649
Marist	12	–	8	.600	18	–	13	.581
Rider	12	–	8	.600	15	–	17	.469
Saint Peter's †	12	–	8	.600	19	–	14	.576
Niagara	11	–	9	.550	16	–	16	.500
Iona	10	–	10	.500	16	–	17	.485
Mount St. Mary's	9	–	11	.450	13	–	19	.406
Canisius	8	–	12	.400	14	–	18	.438
Manhattan	4	–	16	.200	7	–	23	.233
Siena	3	–	17	.150	4	–	28	.125
† 2024 MAAC tournament winner

The 2023–24 Rider Broncs men's basketball team represented Rider University during the 2023–24 NCAA Division I men's basketball season. The Broncs, led by 12th-year head coach Kevin Baggett, played their home games at the Alumni Gymnasium in Lawrenceville, New Jersey as members of the Metro Atlantic Athletic Conference (MAAC).

== Previous season ==
The Broncs finished the 2022–23 season 16–14, 13–7 in MAAC play, to finish in second place. As the #2 seed in the MAAC tournament, they were upset by #10 seed Saint Peter's in the quarterfinals.

== Roster ==
2023–24 Rider Broncs men's basketball team
Players
Coaches

Pos.	#	Name	Height	Weight	Year	Previous school	Hometown
G	0	DJ Dudley	6 ft 4 in (1.93 m)	190 lb (86 kg)	Fr	LA Premier Prep	San Diego, CA
G	2	Allen Powell	6 ft 2 in (1.88 m)	175 lb (79 kg)	RS Sr	La Salle College High School	Philadelphia, PA
G	3	Corey McKeithan	6 ft 0 in (1.83 m)	175 lb (79 kg)	Sr	Windsor High School	Windsor, CT
F	5	Mervin James	6 ft 7 in (2.01 m)	215 lb (98 kg)	RS Sr	North Alabama	Saint Thomas, USVI
G	10	Drew Kousaie	6 ft 0 in (1.83 m)	174 lb (79 kg)	So	Windermere Prep	Kissimmee, FL
F	11	Moustapha Sanoh	6 ft 11 in (2.11 m)	200 lb (91 kg)	Fr	Executive Education Academy Charter	Allentown, PA
G	12	Ruben Rodriguez	6 ft 2 in (1.88 m)	175 lb (79 kg)	Fr	Reading High School	Reading, PA
F	13	Ife West-Ingram	6 ft 6 in (1.98 m)	205 lb (93 kg)	Fr	Abington Friends School	Philadelphia, PA
F	14	JT Jr. Langston	6 ft 8 in (2.03 m)	205 lb (93 kg)	Jr	East Los Angeles College	Fort Wayne, IN
G	22	Jack McFadden	6 ft 4 in (1.93 m)	185 lb (84 kg)	So	Maine-Endwell High School	Endwell, NY
G/F	23	Anthony McCall	6 ft 4 in (1.93 m)	191 lb (87 kg)	So	Academy of the New Church	Philadelphia, PA
G	24	Nic Anthony	6 ft 3 in (1.91 m)	180 lb (82 kg)	Fr	Raleigh Christian Academy	Brantford, ON
F	31	Tyriek Weeks	6 ft 6 in (1.98 m)	200 lb (91 kg)	So	Miami Dade College	Warwick, RI
F	33	Tariq Ingraham	6 ft 9 in (2.06 m)	255 lb (116 kg)	Sr	Wake Forest	Philadelphia, PA

Head coach

- Kevin Baggett (Saint Joseph's)

Assistant coach(es)

- Dino Presley (Kutztown)
- Geoff Arnold (Saint Joseph's)
- Kim Waiters (Robert Morris)
- Jason Thompson (Rider)
- Garrett Collins (UNC Greensboro)

Legend

- (C) Team captain
- (S) Suspended
- (I) Ineligible
- (W) Walk-on
- Injured
- Current redshirt

Roster
Last update: November 24, 2023

== Schedule and results ==
Date time, TV	Rank^{#}	Opponent^{#}	Result	Record	Site (attendance) city, state
Exhibition
October 28, 2023*; 1:00 p.m.		Georgian Court	W 75–53	–	Alumni Gymnasium (1,650); Lawrenceville, NJ
Regular season
November 6, 2023*; 7:00 p.m., ESPN+		Immaculata	W 113–67	1–0	Alumni Gymnasium (1,300); Lawrenceville, NJ
November 10, 2023*; 8:30 p.m., FS1		at No. 5 Marquette	L 65–95	1–1	Fiserv Forum (14,201); Milwaukee, WI
November 13, 2023*; 8:00 p.m., B1G		at Nebraska; Cornhusker Classic	L 50–64	1–2	Pinnacle Bank Arena (13,478); Lincoln, NE
November 17, 2023*; 7:00 p.m., ESPN+		at Duquesne; Cornhusker Classic	L 58–77	1–3	UPMC Cooper Fieldhouse (2,153); Pittsburgh, PA
November 20, 2023*; 6:31 p.m., FloHoops		at Stony Brook; Cornhusker Classic	L 48–55	1–4	Island Federal Arena (1,689); Stony Brook, NY
November 28, 2023*; 7:00 p.m., B1G+		at Maryland	L 76–103	1–5	Xfinity Center (10,432); College Park, MD
December 1, 2023; 7:00 p.m., ESPN+		at Siena	L 65–67	1–6 (0–1)	MVP Arena (5,216); Albany, NY
December 3, 2023; 2:00 p.m., ESPN+		Fairfield	L 81–88	1–7 (0–2)	Alumni Gymnasium (1,650); Lawrenceville, NJ
December 8, 2023*; 7:00 p.m., ESPN+		Stonehill	W 73–56	2–7	Alumni Gymnasium (1,650); Lawrenceville, NJ
December 16, 2023*; 2:00 p.m., NBCSPHI/SNY/FloHoops		at Monmouth	L 71–77	2–8	OceanFirst Bank Center (1,776); West Long Branch, NJ
December 20, 2023*; 7:00 p.m., FloHoops		at Delaware	W 88–85 ^{OT}	3–8	Bob Carpenter Center (1,582); Newark, DE
December 23, 2023*; 1:00 p.m., ESPN+		Penn	L 73–77 ^{OT}	3–9	Alumni Gymnasium (1,650); Lawrenceville, NJ
December 29, 2023*; 2:00 p.m., B1G+		at Penn State	L 63–90	3–10	Bryce Jordan Center (6,807); University Park, PA
January 5, 2024; 7:30 p.m., ESPN+		at Quinnipiac	L 84–88	3–11 (0–3)	M&T Bank Arena (887); Hamden, CT
January 7, 2024; 2:00 p.m., ESPN+		Canisius	W 79–76 ^{OT}	4–11 (1–3)	Alumni Gymnasium (1,565); Lawrenceville, NJ
January 12, 2024; 7:00 p.m., ESPN+		Manhattan	W 71–58	5–11 (2–3)	Alumni Gymnasium (1,115); Lawrenceville, NJ
January 14, 2024; 2:00 p.m., ESPN+		at Marist	L 60–83	5–12 (2–4)	McCann Arena (1,012); Poughkeepsie, NY
January 19, 2024; 7:00 p.m., ESPN+		Niagara	L 74–78	5–13 (2–5)	Alumni Gymnasium (1,014); Lawrenceville, NJ
January 25, 2024; 7:00 p.m., ESPN+		at Saint Peter's	W 62–57	6–13 (3–5)	Run Baby Run Arena; Jersey City, NJ
January 27, 2024; 5:00 p.m., ESPN+		at Mount St. Mary's	W 66–62	7–13 (4–5)	Knott Arena (2,965); Emmitsburg, MD
February 2, 2024; 7:00 p.m., ESPN+		Siena	W 91–50	8–13 (5–5)	Alumni Gymnasium (1,650); Lawrenceville, NJ
February 4, 2024; 1:00 p.m., ESPN+		at Iona	L 93–94	8–14 (5–6)	Hynes Athletics Center (1,669); New Rochelle, NY
February 8, 2024; 7:00 p.m., ESPN+		at Fairfield	L 67–84	8–15 (5–7)	Leo D. Mahoney Arena (1,692); Fairfield, CT
February 10, 2024; 7:00 p.m., ESPN+		Marist	L 62–77	8–16 (5–8)	Alumni Gymnasium (1,578); Lawrenceville, NJ
February 16, 2024; 7:00 p.m., ESPN+		Mount St. Mary's	W 61–57	9–16 (6–8)	Alumni Gymnasium (1,587); Lawrenceville, NJ
February 18, 2024; 2:00 p.m., ESPN+		at Manhattan	W 104–62	10–16 (7–8)	Draddy Gymnasium (627); Riverdale, NY
February 23, 2024; 7:00 p.m., ESPN+		Iona	W 78–75	11–16 (8–8)	Alumni Gymnasium (1,650); Lawrenceville, NJ
February 25, 2024; 2:00 p.m., ESPN+		Quinnipiac	W 88–78	12–16 (9–8)	Alumni Gymnasium (1,614); Lawrenceville, NJ
March 1, 2024; 7:00 p.m., ESPN+		at Niagara	W 71–61	13–16 (10–8)	Gallagher Center (1,353); Lewiston, NY
March 3, 2024; 1:00 p.m., ESPN+		at Canisius	W 65–61	14–16 (11–8)	Koessler Athletic Center (788); Buffalo, NY
March 7, 2024; 8:00 p.m., ESPN+		Saint Peter's	W 61–56	15–16 (12–8)	Alumni Gymnasium (1,650); Lawrenceville, NJ
MAAC tournament
March 14, 2024; 9:00 p.m., ESPN+	(4)	vs. (5) Saint Peter's; Quarterfinals	L 48–50	15–17	Boardwalk Hall (1,544); Atlantic City, NJ
*Non-conference game. ^{#}Rankings from AP poll. (#) Tournament seedings in parentheses. All times are in Eastern.
