= 2023–24 Manhattan Jaspers men's basketball team =

Basketball team season

2023–24 Manhattan Jaspers men's basketball
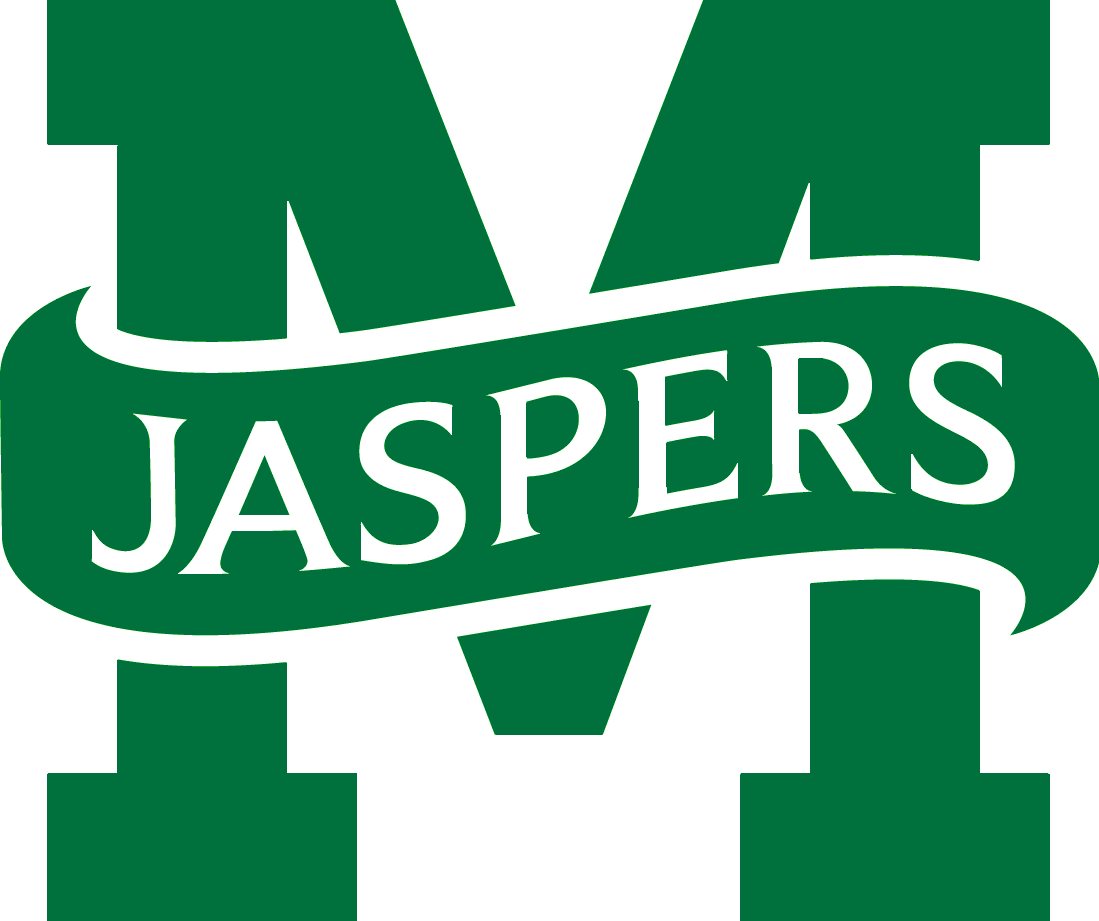
- Conference: Metro Atlantic Athletic Conference
- Record: 7–23 (4–16 MAAC)
- Head coach: John Gallagher (1st season)
- Assistant coaches: Tim Brooks; Anthony Doran; JR Lynch
- Home arena: Draddy Gymnasium

2023–24 MAAC men's basketball standings
| | Conf. | | | | Overall |
| Team | W | | L | PCT | W | | L | PCT |
|---|---|---|---|---|---|---|---|---|
| Quinnipiac | 15 | – | 5 | .750 | 24 | – | 10 | .706 |
| Fairfield | 14 | – | 6 | .700 | 24 | – | 13 | .649 |
| Marist | 12 | – | 8 | .600 | 18 | – | 13 | .581 |
| Rider | 12 | – | 8 | .600 | 15 | – | 17 | .469 |
| Saint Peter's † | 12 | – | 8 | .600 | 19 | – | 14 | .576 |
| Niagara | 11 | – | 9 | .550 | 16 | – | 16 | .500 |
| Iona | 10 | – | 10 | .500 | 16 | – | 17 | .485 |
| Mount St. Mary's | 9 | – | 11 | .450 | 13 | – | 19 | .406 |
| Canisius | 8 | – | 12 | .400 | 14 | – | 18 | .438 |
| Manhattan | 4 | – | 16 | .200 | 7 | – | 23 | .233 |
| Siena | 3 | – | 17 | .150 | 4 | – | 28 | .125 |
† 2024 MAAC tournament winner

The 2023–24 Manhattan Jaspers men's basketball team represented Manhattan College during the 2023–24 NCAA Division I men's basketball season. The Jaspers, led by first-year head coach John Gallagher, played their home games at Draddy Gymnasium in Riverdale, New York as members of the Metro Atlantic Athletic Conference (MAAC).

== Previous season ==
The Jaspers finished the 2022–23 season 12–18, 10–10 in MAAC play, to finish in a tie for fifth place. In the first round of the MAAC tournament, they were upset by Marist. On March 28, it was announced that Hartford head coach John Gallagher was announced as the team's next head coach.

== Roster ==
2023–24 Manhattan Jaspers men's basketball team
Players
Coaches

| Pos. | # | Name | Height | Weight | Year | Hometown |
|---|---|---|---|---|---|---|
| G/F | 0 | Seydou Traore | 6 ft 7 in (2.01 m) | 215 lb (98 kg) | Fr | New York, NY |
| G | 1 | Shaquil Bender | 6 ft 2 in (1.88 m) | 185 lb (84 kg) | Jr | Philadelphia, PA |
| G | 2 | Jaden Winston | 6 ft 0 in (1.83 m) | 160 lb (73 kg) | Fr | South Laurel, MD |
| G | 3 | Perry Cowan | 6 ft 4 in (1.93 m) | 205 lb (93 kg) | GS | Chicago, IL |
| G | 4 | Brett Rumpel | 6 ft 4 in (1.93 m) | 190 lb (86 kg) | RS So | Binghamton, NY |
| G | 5 | Lorenzo Washington | 6 ft 0 in (1.83 m) | 170 lb (77 kg) | So | Middletown, NY |
| G | 10 | Rokas Jocys | 6 ft 5 in (1.96 m) | 200 lb (91 kg) | Fr | Palanga, Lithuania |
| G | 11 | Briggs McClain | 6 ft 4 in (1.93 m) | 180 lb (82 kg) | Sr | Martinsburg, WV |
| G | 12 | Allen Myers | 6 ft 9 in (2.06 m) | 185 lb (84 kg) | Fr | North Philadelphia, PA |
| G/F | 14 | Wesley Robinson | 6 ft 7 in (2.01 m) | 210 lb (95 kg) | Jr | Burlington, NJ |
| F | 15 | Michael Lawlor | 6 ft 8 in (2.03 m) | — | Fr | Eastchester, NY |
| G | 20 | Bryce Stokes | 6 ft 3 in (1.91 m) | 200 lb (91 kg) | Fr | Paterson, NJ |
| G | 22 | Daniel Hackett | 6 ft 1 in (1.85 m) | 175 lb (79 kg) | Jr | Commack, NY |
| F | 23 | Daniel Rouzan | 6 ft 8 in (2.03 m) | 235 lb (107 kg) | So | Las Vegas, NV |
| F | 24 | Xinyi Li | 6 ft 9 in (2.06 m) | 235 lb (107 kg) | Fr | Beijing, China |
| G/F | 34 | Logan Padgett | 6 ft 6 in (1.98 m) | 210 lb (95 kg) | Sr | Homewood, AL |
| G | 55 | Raziel Hayun | 6 ft 4 in (1.93 m) | 187 lb (85 kg) | So | Eilat, Israel |

Head coach

- John Gallagher (Saint Joseph's)

Assistant coach(es)

- Tim Brooks (James Madison)
- Anthony Doran (St. John's)
- JR Lynch (Hartford)

Legend

- (C) Team captain
- (S) Suspended
- (I) Ineligible
- (W) Walk-on
- Injured
- Current redshirt

Roster
Last update: October 27, 2023

== Schedule and results ==
| Date time, TV | Rank^{#} | Opponent^{#} | Result | Record | Site (attendance) city, state |
Exhibition
| October 28, 2023*; 1:00 p.m. | | at Saint Joseph's | L 68–78 | | Hagan Arena; Philadelphia, PA |
Regular season
| November 6, 2023*; 7:30 p.m., ESPN+ | | at Bryant | W 61–59 | 1–0 | Chace Athletic Center (752); Smithfield, RI |
| November 10, 2023*; 8:00 p.m., ESPN+ | | at No. 1 Kansas | L 61–99 | 1–1 | Allen Fieldhouse (16,300); Lawrence, KS |
| November 16, 2023*; 7:00 p.m., ESPN+ | | Felician | W 79–67 | 2–1 | Draddy Gymnasium (1,287); Riverdale, NY |
| November 19, 2023*; 1:00 p.m., NEC Front Row | | at Central Connecticut | W 67–63 | 3–1 | William H. Detrick Gymnasium (1,047); New Britain, CT |
| November 24, 2023*; 2:00 p.m., FS1 | | at No. 5 UConn | L 60–90 | 3–2 | XL Center (15,006); Hartford, CT |
| November 27, 2023*; 7:00 p.m. | | at Fordham; Battle of the Bronx | L 61–93 | 3–3 | Rose Hill Gymnasium (1,873); The Bronx, NY |
| December 1, 2023; 7:00 p.m., ESPN+ | | Mount St. Mary's | W 75–74 ^{OT} | 4–3 (1–0) | Draddy Gymnasium (1,097); Riverdale, NY |
| December 3, 2023; 2:00 p.m., ESPN+ | | at Marist | L 56–70 | 4–4 (1–1) | McCann Arena (1,637); Poughkeepsie, NY |
| December 8, 2023*; 7:00 p.m., ESPN+ | | Fairleigh Dickinson | L 71–76 | 4–5 | Draddy Gymnasium (1,293); Riverdale, NY |
| December 21, 2023*; 2:00 p.m., SNY | | at Monmouth | L 71–77 | 4–6 | OceanFirst Bank Center (1,407); West Long Branch, NJ |
| December 30, 2023*; 7:00 p.m., ESPN+ | | Wagner | L 56–68 | 4–7 | Draddy Gymnasium (909); Riverdale, NY |
| January 5, 2024; 7:00 p.m., ESPN+ | | Niagara | L 67–81 | 4–8 (1–2) | Draddy Gymnasium (487); Riverdale, NY |
| January 7, 2024; 2:00 p.m., ESPN+ | | at Quinnipiac | L 59–76 | 4–9 (1–3) | M&T Bank Arena (738); Hamden, CT |
| January 12, 2024; 7:00 p.m., ESPN+ | | at Rider | L 58–71 | 4–10 (1–4) | Alumni Gymnasium (1,115); Lawrenceville, NJ |
| January 14, 2024; 2:00 p.m., ESPN+ | | Saint Peter's | L 68–81 | 4–11 (1–5) | Draddy Gymnasium (880); Riverdale, NY |
| January 21, 2024; 2:00 p.m., ESPN+ | | Fairfield | L 75–82 | 4–12 (1–6) | Draddy Gymnasium (717); Riverdale, NY |
| January 26, 2024; 7:00 p.m., ESPN+ | | at Canisius | L 70–82 | 4–13 (1–7) | Koessler Athletic Center (899); Buffalo, NY |
| January 28, 2024; 2:00 p.m., ESPN+ | | at Niagara | W 84–78 ^{OT} | 5–13 (2–7) | Gallagher Center (905); Lewiston, NY |
| February 2, 2024; 7:00 p.m., ESPN+ | | Quinnipiac | L 71–77 | 5–14 (2–8) | Draddy Gymnasium (787); Riverdale, NY |
| February 4, 2024; 2:00 p.m., ESPN+ | | at Fairfield | L 68–77 | 5–15 (2–9) | Leo D. Mahoney Arena (3,226); Fairfield, CT |
| February 8, 2024; 7:00 p.m., ESPN+ | | at Mount St. Mary's | L 78–82 | 5–16 (2–10) | Knott Arena (2,270); Emmitsburg, MD |
| February 10, 2024; 7:00 p.m., ESPN+ | | Siena | L 63–68 | 5–17 (2–11) | Draddy Gymnasium (707); Riverdale, NY |
| February 16, 2024; 2:00 p.m., ESPN+ | | at Iona | L 63–73 | 5–18 (2–12) | Hynes Athletics Center (1,862); New Rochelle, NY |
| February 18, 2024; 2:00 p.m., ESPN+ | | Rider | L 62–104 | 5–19 (2–13) | Draddy Gymnasium (627); Riverdale, NY |
| February 23, 2024; 7:00 p.m., ESPN+ | | Marist | L 50–57 | 5–20 (2–14) | Draddy Gymnasium (989); Riverdale, NY |
| March 1, 2024; 7:00 p.m., ESPN+ | | at Siena | W 70–68 | 6–20 (3–14) | MVP Arena (4,832); Albany, NY |
| March 3, 2024; 2:00 p.m., ESPN+ | | at Saint Peter's | L 57–89 | 6–21 (3–15) | Run Baby Run Arena (684); Jersey City, NJ |
| March 7, 2024; 7:00 p.m., ESPN+ | | Iona | W 77–60 | 7–21 (4–15) | Draddy Gymnasium (812); Riverdale, NY |
| March 9, 2024; 4:00 p.m., ESPN+ | | Canisius | L 70–73 ^{OT} | 7–22 (4–16) | Draddy Gymnasium (950); Riverdale, NY |
MAAC tournament
| March 12, 2024; 7:30 p.m., ESPN+ | (10) | vs. (7) Iona; First round | L 57–60 | 7–23 | Boardwalk Hall; Atlantic City, NJ |
*Non-conference game. ^{#}Rankings from AP poll. (#) Tournament seedings in parentheses. All times are in Eastern.
