= 2023–24 Marist Red Foxes men's basketball team =

American college basketball season

2023–24 Marist Red Foxes men's basketball
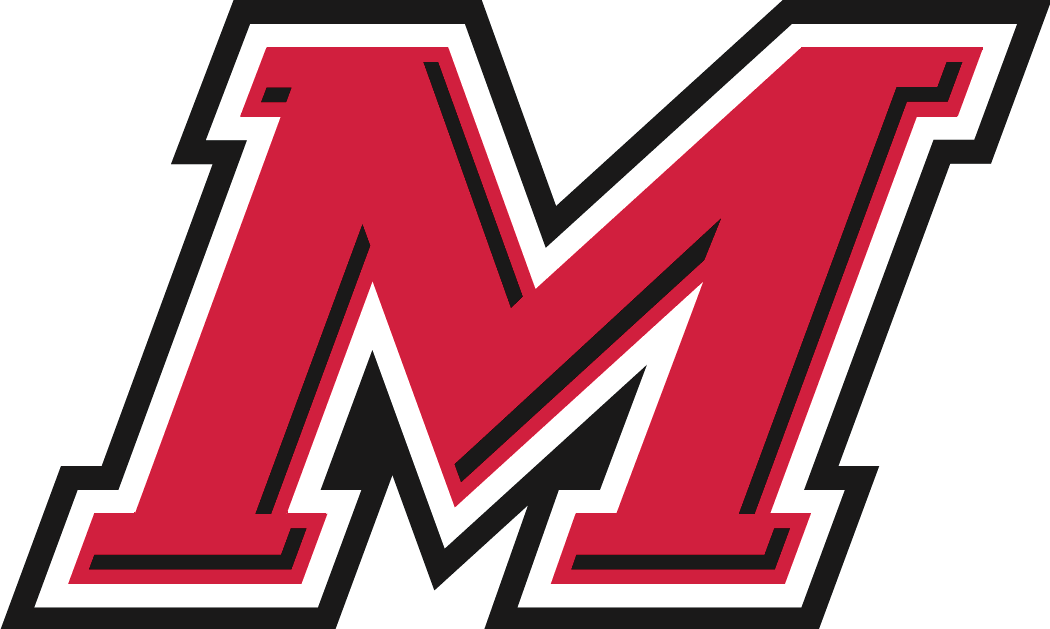
- Conference: Metro Atlantic Athletic Conference
- Record: 18–13 (12–8 MAAC)
- Head coach: John Dunne (6th season)
- Assistant coaches: Dalip Bhatia; Derrick Phelps; Drew Metz; Brandon Hall
- Home arena: McCann Arena

2023–24 MAAC men's basketball standings
	Conf.				Overall
Team	W		L	PCT	W		L	PCT
Quinnipiac	15	–	5	.750	24	–	10	.706
Fairfield	14	–	6	.700	24	–	13	.649
Marist	12	–	8	.600	18	–	13	.581
Rider	12	–	8	.600	15	–	17	.469
Saint Peter's †	12	–	8	.600	19	–	14	.576
Niagara	11	–	9	.550	16	–	16	.500
Iona	10	–	10	.500	16	–	17	.485
Mount St. Mary's	9	–	11	.450	13	–	19	.406
Canisius	8	–	12	.400	14	–	18	.438
Manhattan	4	–	16	.200	7	–	23	.233
Siena	3	–	17	.150	4	–	28	.125
† 2024 MAAC tournament winner

The 2023–24 Marist Red Foxes men's basketball team represented Marist College during the 2023–24 NCAA Division I men's basketball season. The Red Foxes, led by sixth-year head coach John Dunne, played their home games at the McCann Arena in Poughkeepsie, New York as members of the Metro Atlantic Athletic Conference (MAAC). They finished the season 18–13, 12–8 in MAAC play, to finish in a three-way tie for third place.

== Previous season ==
The Red Foxes finished the 2022–23 season 13–20, 6–14 in MAAC play, to finish in last place. They upset Manhattan, Quinnipiac and Saint Peter's, before ending their Cinderella run to Iona in the MAAC tournament championship game.

== Roster ==
2023–24 Marist Red Foxes men's basketball team
Players
Coaches

Pos.	#	Name	Height	Weight	Year	Previous school	Hometown
G	0	Jadin Collins	6 ft 1 in (1.85 m)	175 lb (79 kg)	Fr	Rutgers Prep	Edison, NJ
F	1	Jason Schofield	6 ft 9 in (2.06 m)	230 lb (104 kg)	Fr	South Kent School	Poughkeepsie, NY
G	2	Noah Harris	6 ft 1 in (1.85 m)	180 lb (82 kg)	Jr	Rutgers Prep	Manalapan, NJ
F	4	Jackson Price	6 ft 8 in (2.03 m)	240 lb (109 kg)	Jr	The Citadel	Hiram, GA
G	5	Isaiah Brickner	6 ft 4 in (1.93 m)	190 lb (86 kg)	So	Sunrise Christian Academy	San Diego, CA
F	10	Trace Salton	6 ft 5 in (1.96 m)	195 lb (88 kg)	So	Bridgton Academy	Lake Oswego, OR
F	11	Jaden Daughtry	6 ft 6 in (1.98 m)	200 lb (91 kg)	So	St. Francis Prep	Fresh Meadows, NY
C	13	Max II Allen	6 ft 9 in (2.06 m)	250 lb (113 kg)	So	San Jose State	Las Vegas, NV
G	15	Josh Pascarelli	6 ft 3 in (1.91 m)	195 lb (88 kg)	Fr	St. Francis Prep	Cambria Heights, NY
F	21	Matt McCool	6 ft 8 in (2.03 m)	230 lb (104 kg)	So	South Kent School	Amherst, NH
F	23	Javon Cooley	6 ft 5 in (1.96 m)	205 lb (93 kg)	GS	Bosco Institute	Chicago, IL
G	24	Kam Farris	6 ft 3 in (1.91 m)	175 lb (79 kg)	Sr	Robert Morris	Burlington, VT
G	30	Isaiah Sulack	6 ft 5 in (1.96 m)	190 lb (86 kg)	GS	Tennessee	Knoxville, TN
F	32	Mack Wall	6 ft 7 in (2.01 m)	195 lb (88 kg)	So	Jesuit High School	Portland, OR

Head coach

- John Dunne (Ithaca)

Assistant coach(es)

- Dalip Bhatia (Rutgers)
- Derrick Phelps (North Carolina)
- Drew Metz (St. John's)
- Brandon Hall (Saint Peter's)

Legend

- (C) Team captain
- (S) Suspended
- (I) Ineligible
- (W) Walk-on
- Injured
- Current redshirt

Roster
Last update: November 22, 2023

== Schedule and results ==
Date time, TV	Rank^{#}	Opponent^{#}	Result	Record	High points	High rebounds	High assists	Site (attendance) city, state
Regular season
November 6, 2023*; 8:00 p.m., ESPN+		at Army	W 71–55	1–0	13 – tied	5 – Brickner	5 – Brickner	Christl Arena (770); West Point, NY
November 11, 2023*; 3:30 p.m., ESPN+		at UMBC	W 65–59	2–0	12 – Allen II	8 – Daughtry	4 – Brickner	Chesapeake Employers Insurance Arena (1,306); Catonsville, MD
November 18, 2023*; 3:30 p.m., ESPN+		at Binghamton	L 59–82	2–1	17 – Allen II	5 – tied	3 – Pascarelli	Binghamton University Events Center (2,164); Vestal, NY
November 21, 2023*; 7:00 p.m., ESPN+		at New Hampshire	L 71–74	2–2	28 – Allen II	6 – Brickner	8 – Brickner	Lundholm Gym (462); Durham, NH
November 25, 2023*; 4:00 p.m., ESPN+		Bucknell	W 73–49	3–2	15 – Harris	8 – Price	3 – tied	McCann Arena (952); Poughkeepsie, NY
November 29, 2023; 7:00 p.m., ESPN+		at Iona	W 68–64	4–2 (1–0)	16 – Collins	7 – Brickner	4 – Brickner	Hynes Athletics Center (1,845); New Rochelle, NY
December 3, 2023; 2:00 p.m., ESPN+		Manhattan	W 70–56	5–2 (2–0)	16 – Pascarelli	8 – Cooley	3 – tied	McCann Arena (1,637); Poughkeepsie, NY
December 9, 2023*; 4:00 p.m., ESPN+		at Dartmouth	W 63–53	6–2	26 – Pascarelli	8 – Cooley	3 – Allen II	Leede Arena (619); Hanover, NH
December 18, 2023*; 7:00 p.m., ESPN+		Maryland Eastern Shore	W 76–52	7–2	19 – Price	8 – Brickner	9 – Collins	McCann Arena (697); Poughkeepsie, NY
December 22, 2023*; 8:00 p.m., ACCN		at Notre Dame	L 56–60	7–3	14 – Allen II	7 – Daughtry	5 – Collins	Joyce Center (5,440); Notre Dame, IN
December 30, 2023*; 2:00 p.m., ESPN+		Lehigh	L 58–65	7–4	22 – Pascarelli	10 – Daughtry	2 – tied	McCann Arena (1,872); Poughkeepsie, NY
January 7, 2024; 2:00 p.m., ESPN+		at Fairfield	L 61–82	7–5 (2–1)	15 – Collins	6 – tied	7 – Collins	Leo D. Mahoney Arena (1,947); Fairfield, CT
January 12, 2024; 7:00 p.m., ESPN+		Quinnipiac	L 55–66	7–6 (2–2)	13 – Collins	11 – Allen II	3 – Collins	McCann Arena (1,595); Poughkeepsie, NY
January 14, 2024; 2:00 p.m., ESPN+		Rider	W 83–60	8–6 (3–2)	23 – Pascarelli	8 – Daughtry	3 – tied	McCann Arena (1,012); Poughkeepsie, NY
January 19, 2024; 7:00 p.m., ESPN+		at Mount St. Mary's	L 48–65	8–7 (3–3)	15 – Harris	5 – Cooley	3 – Allen II	Knott Arena (1,808); Emmitsburg, MD
January 21, 2024; 2:00 p.m., ESPN+		Siena	W 50–48	9–7 (4–3)	15 – Allen II	9 – Allen II	3 – tied	McCann Arena (1,886); Poughkeepsie, NY
January 26, 2024; 7:00 p.m., ESPN+		at Niagara	L 62–67	9–8 (4–4)	17 – Daughtry	6 – Cooley	2 – tied	Gallagher Center (1,687); Lewiston, NY
January 28, 2024; 1:00 p.m., ESPN+		at Canisius	W 80–71	10–8 (5–4)	20 – Pascarelli	4 – tied	5 – Collins	Koessler Athletic Center (620); Buffalo, NY
February 2, 2024; 7:00 p.m., ESPN+		Mount St. Mary's	L 58–76	10–9 (5–5)	11 – Salton	5 – Price	3 – Collins	McCann Arena (1,360); Poughkeepsie, NY
February 4, 2024; 2:00 p.m., ESPN+		Saint Peter's	W 63–52	11–9 (6–5)	11 – tied	9 – Collins	7 – Pascarelli	McCann Arena (1,490); Poughkeepsie, NY
February 8, 2024; 7:00 p.m., ESPN+		at Siena	W 67–51	12–9 (7–5)	11 – tied	7 – Brickner	4 – Collins	MVP Arena (5,218); Albany, NY
February 10, 2024; 7:00 p.m., ESPN+		at Rider	W 77–62	13–9 (8–5)	17 – Price	8 – Brickner	3 – tied	Alumni Gymnasium (1,578); Lawrenceville, NJ
February 16, 2024; 7:00 p.m., ESPN+		Canisius	W 78–55	14–9 (9–5)	16 – tied	5 – tied	5 – tied	McCann Arena (1,667); Poughkeepsie, NY
February 23, 2024; 7:00 p.m., ESPN+		at Manhattan	W 57–50	15–9 (10–5)	15 – Allen II	9 – Allen II	4 – Pascarelli	Draddy Gymnasium (989); Riverdale, NY
February 25, 2024; 3:00 p.m., ESPN+		at Saint Peter's	L 60–69	15–10 (10–6)	12 – Price	16 – Daughtry	3 – Price	Run Baby Run Arena (572); Jersey City, NJ
March 1, 2024; 7:00 p.m., ESPNU		Fairfield	W 58–55	16–10 (11–6)	13 – Pascarelli	9 – Brickner	3 – tied	McCann Arena (2,301); Poughkeepsie, NY
March 3, 2024; 2:00 p.m., ESPN+		Iona	L 64–71	16–11 (11–7)	15 – Allen II	8 – Cooley	4 – Harris	McCann Arena (1,762); Poughkeepsie, NY
March 7, 2024; 7:00 p.m., ESPN+		at Quinnipiac	L 64–73	16–12 (11–8)	12 – Price	11 – Collins	3 – tied	M&T Bank Arena (1,249); Hamden, CT
March 9, 2024; 2:00 p.m., ESPN+		Niagara	W 63–62	17–12 (12–8)	16 – Pascarelli	5 – tied	2 – tied	McCann Arena (1,277); Poughkeepsie, NY
MAAC tournament
March 14, 2024; 6:30 p.m., ESPN+	(3)	vs. (6) Niagara; Quarterfinals	W 65–59	18–12	20 – Collins	7 – Pascarelli	4 – Collins	Boardwalk Hall; Atlantic City, NJ
March 15, 2024; 9:00 p.m., ESPNews	(3)	vs. (2) Fairfield; Semifinals	L 61–65	18–13	14 – Cooley	5 – tied	4 – Collins	Boardwalk Hall (1,783); Atlantic City, NJ
*Non-conference game. ^{#}Rankings from AP poll. (#) Tournament seedings in parentheses. All times are in Eastern.
