= 2023–24 Fairfield Stags men's basketball team =

American college basketball season

2023–24 Fairfield Stags men's basketball
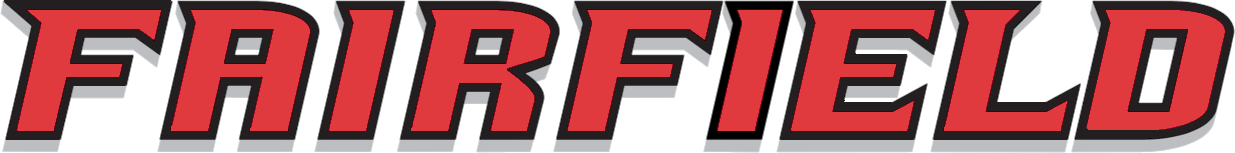

CBI, Semifinals
- Conference: Metro Atlantic Athletic Conference
- Record: 24–13 (14–6 MAAC)
- Head coach: Chris Casey (1st season)
- Assistant coaches: Glenn Braica; Taj Benning
- Home arena: Leo D. Mahoney Arena

2023–24 MAAC men's basketball standings
	Conf.				Overall
Team	W		L	PCT	W		L	PCT
Quinnipiac	15	–	5	.750	24	–	10	.706
Fairfield	14	–	6	.700	24	–	13	.649
Marist	12	–	8	.600	18	–	13	.581
Rider	12	–	8	.600	15	–	17	.469
Saint Peter's †	12	–	8	.600	19	–	14	.576
Niagara	11	–	9	.550	16	–	16	.500
Iona	10	–	10	.500	16	–	17	.485
Mount St. Mary's	9	–	11	.450	13	–	19	.406
Canisius	8	–	12	.400	14	–	18	.438
Manhattan	4	–	16	.200	7	–	23	.233
Siena	3	–	17	.150	4	–	28	.125
† 2024 MAAC tournament winner

The 2023–24 Fairfield Stags men's basketball team represented Fairfield University during the 2023–24 NCAA Division I men's basketball season. The Stags, led by first-year head coach Chris Casey, played their home games at Leo D. Mahoney Arena in Fairfield, Connecticut as members of the Metro Atlantic Athletic Conference (MAAC).

== Previous season ==
The Stags finished the 2022–23 season 13–18, 9–11 in MAAC play, to finish in seventh place. They were defeated by Saint Peter's in the first round of the MAAC tournament.

On October 17, 2023, just weeks before the season opener, head coach Jay Young announced that he would be stepping down after four years as the team's head coach, with assistant coach Chris Casey immediately being named the interim head coach for the 2023–24 season.

== Roster ==
2023–24 Fairfield Stags men's basketball team
Players
Coaches

Pos.	#	Name	Height	Weight	Year	Hometown
G	0	Caleb Fields	6 ft 2 in (1.88 m)	185 lb (84 kg)	GS	Cape May Court House, NJ
F	1	Birima Seck	6 ft 11 in (2.11 m)	200 lb (91 kg)	Jr	Dakar, Senegal
G	2	Brycen Goodine	6 ft 4 in (1.93 m)	180 lb (82 kg)	RS Sr	New Bedford, MA
G	3	Jalen Leach	6 ft 4 in (1.93 m)	200 lb (91 kg)	Sr	Nyack, NY
G	4	Jasper Floyd	6 ft 3 in (1.91 m)	195 lb (88 kg)	Jr	Tampa, FL
G	5	Matt Curtis	6 ft 4 in (1.93 m)	190 lb (86 kg)	Fr	Ellington, CT
F	10	Alexis Yetna	6 ft 8 in (2.03 m)	230 lb (104 kg)	GS	Paris, France
G/F	12	Louis Bleechmore	6 ft 6 in (1.98 m)	205 lb (93 kg)	Sr	Sydney, Australia
G	13	Anthony Jr. Davis	6 ft 5 in (1.96 m)	180 lb (82 kg)	RS Fr	Stephens City, VA
G	14	James Jr. Johns	6 ft 6 in (1.98 m)	185 lb (84 kg)	So	Claymont, DE
F	15	Jack Brown	6 ft 6 in (1.98 m)	200 lb (91 kg)	Sr	Greenville, DE
G	20	Ryan McPartlan	6 ft 4 in (1.93 m)	190 lb (86 kg)	So	White Plains, NY
G	22	Luke Davidson	6 ft 0 in (1.83 m)	185 lb (84 kg)	So	Fayetteville, NY
G/F	23	Marouf Moumine	6 ft 6 in (1.98 m)	185 lb (84 kg)	Fr	Yaoundé, Cameroon
G	24	Joe Ganton	6 ft 4 in (1.93 m)	190 lb (86 kg)	Fr	North Caldwell, NJ
G/F	25	Michael Rogan	6 ft 7 in (2.01 m)	195 lb (88 kg)	RS Fr	Saratoga Springs, NY
F	33	Peyton Smith	6 ft 10 in (2.08 m)	250 lb (113 kg)	Fr	Hudson Falls, NY

Head coach

- Chris Casey (interim) (Western Connecticut State)

Assistant coach(es)

- Glenn Braica (Queens College)
- Taj Benning (Fairfield)

Legend

- (C) Team captain
- (S) Suspended
- (I) Ineligible
- (W) Walk-on
- Injured
- Current redshirt

Roster
Last update: November 11, 2023

== Schedule and results ==
Date time, TV	Rank^{#}	Opponent^{#}	Result	Record	Site (attendance) city, state
Costa Rica Summer Trip
August 12, 2023*; 8:00 p.m.		vs. British Columbia	W 90–69	–	BN Arena; San José, Costa Rica
August 13, 2023*; 9:00 p.m.		vs. British Columbia	W 88–64	–	BN Arena; San José, Costa Rica
August 14, 2023*; 7:00 p.m.		vs. British Columbia	W 73–67	–	BN Arena; San José, Costa Rica
Regular season
November 6, 2023*; 8:00 p.m., ACCNX/ESPN+		at Boston College	L 70–89	0–1	Conte Forum (4,736); Chestnut Hill, MA
November 9, 2023*; 7:00 p.m., ESPN+		at Rhode Island	L 80–93	0–2	Ryan Center (4,155); Kingston, RI
November 13, 2023*; 7:00 p.m., ESPN+		Mount Saint Mary	W 92–45	1–2	Leo D. Mahoney Arena (2,107); Fairfield, CT
November 17, 2023*; 7:00 p.m., FloHoops		at Drexel; Market Street Challenge	L 47–65	1–3	Daskalakis Athletic Center (1,706); Philadelphia, PA
November 18, 2023*; 6:00 p.m., FloHoops		vs. Queens; Market Street Challenge	L 63–69	1–4	Daskalakis Athletic Center (338); Philadelphia, PA
November 24, 2023*; 7:00 p.m., ESPN+		New Hampshire	L 80–83	1–5	Leo D. Mahoney Arena (1,455); Fairfield, CT
December 1, 2023; 7:00 p.m., ESPN+		Iona	L 67–78	1–6 (0–1)	Leo D. Mahoney Arena (2,640); Fairfield, CT
December 3, 2023; 2:00 p.m., ESPN+		at Rider	W 88–81	2–6 (1–1)	Alumni Gymnasium (1,650); Lawrenceville, NJ
December 6, 2023*; 7:00 p.m., ESPN+		at Yale	W 75–71	3–6	John J. Lee Amphitheater (747); New Haven, CT
December 9, 2023*; 6:00 p.m., NEC Front Row		at Sacred Heart	W 67–57	4–6	William H. Pitt Center (1,387); Fairfield, CT
December 17, 2023*; 2:00 p.m., ESPN+		Wagner	W 63–51	5–6	Leo D. Mahoney Arena (1,616); Fairfield, CT
December 21, 2023*; 7:00 p.m., YES		at Fairleigh Dickinson	W 92–69	6–6	Rothman Center (703); Hackensack, NJ
December 30, 2023*; 2:00 p.m., ESPN+		Le Moyne	W 78–72	7–6	Leo D. Mahoney Arena (2,211); Fairfield, CT
January 5, 2024; 7:00 p.m., ESPN+		at Siena	W 93–69	8–6 (2–1)	MVP Arena (4,931); Albany, NY
January 7, 2024; 2:00 p.m., ESPN+		Marist	W 82–61	9–6 (3–1)	Leo D. Mahoney Arena (1,947); Fairfield, CT
January 12, 2024; 7:00 p.m., ESPN+		at Niagara	L 72–96	9–7 (3–2)	Gallagher Center (995); Lewiston, NY
January 15, 2024; 12:00 p.m., ESPN+		at Canisius	W 88–63	10–7 (4–2)	Koessler Athletic Center (528); Buffalo, NY
January 19, 2024; 7:00 p.m., ESPN+		Saint Peter's	W 76–67	11–7 (5–2)	Leo D. Mahoney Arena (3,382); Fairfield, CT
January 21, 2024; 2:00 p.m., ESPN+		at Manhattan	W 82–75	12–7 (6–2)	Draddy Gymnasium (717); Riverdale, NY
January 28, 2024; 2:00 p.m., ESPN+		Quinnipiac	L 64–66	12–8 (6–3)	Leo D. Mahoney Arena (3,137); Fairfield, CT
February 2, 2024; 7:00 p.m., ESPN+		at Iona	L 82–91	12–9 (6–4)	Hynes Athletics Center (1,888); New Rochelle, NY
February 4, 2024; 2:00 p.m., ESPN+		Manhattan	W 77–68	13–9 (7–4)	Leo D. Mahoney Arena (3,226); Fairfield, CT
February 8, 2024; 7:00 p.m., ESPN+		Rider	W 84–67	14–9 (8–4)	Leo D. Mahoney Arena; Fairfield, CT
February 10, 2024; 2:00 p.m., ESPN+		at Saint Peter's	W 64–62	15–9 (9–4)	Run Baby Run Arena (644); Jersey City, NJ
February 16, 2024; 7:00 p.m., ESPN+		Niagara	L 63–65	15–10 (9–5)	Leo D. Mahoney Arena (1,952); Fairfield, CT
February 18, 2024; 2:00 p.m., ESPN+		Mount St. Mary's	W 94–80	16–10 (10–5)	Leo D. Mahoney Arena (2,327); Fairfield, CT
February 23, 2024; 7:00 p.m., ESPN+		at Quinnipiac	W 85–81	17–10 (11–5)	M&T Bank Arena (3,570); Hamden, CT
February 25, 2024; 2:00 p.m., ESPN+		Siena	W 88–64	18–10 (12–5)	Leo D. Mahoney Arena (3,561); Fairfield, CT
March 1, 2024; 7:00 p.m., ESPN+		at Marist	L 55–58	18–11 (12–6)	McCann Arena (2,301); Poughkeepsie, NY
March 7, 2024; 7:00 p.m., ESPN+		Canisius	W 74–62	19–11 (13–6)	Leo D. Mahoney Arena (1,929); Fairfield, CT
March 9, 2024; 4:00 p.m., ESPN+		at Mount St. Mary's	W 96–92	20–11 (14–6)	Knott Arena (2,790); Emmitsburg, MD
MAAC tournament
March 13, 2024; 7:30 p.m., ESPN+	(2)	vs. (7) Iona; Quarterfinals	W 68–63	21–11	Boardwalk Hall (1,443); Atlantic City, NJ
March 15, 2024; 9:00 p.m., ESPNews	(2)	vs. (3) Marist; Semifinals	W 65–61	22–11	Boardwalk Hall; Atlantic City, NJ
March 16, 2024; 7:30 p.m., ESPNU	(2)	vs. (5) Saint Peter's; Championship	L 63–68	22–12	Boardwalk Hall (2,477); Atlantic City, NJ
CBI
March 24, 2024; 3:30 p.m., FloHoops	(7)	vs. (10) Little Rock; First round	W 82–75	23–12	Ocean Center; Daytona Beach, FL
March 25, 2024; 4:30 p.m., FloHoops	(7)	vs. (15) Chicago State; Quarterfinals	W 77–74	24–12	Ocean Center; Daytona Beach, FL
March 26, 2024; 9:00 p.m., ESPN2	(7)	vs. (3) Seattle; Semifinals	L 58–75	24–13	Ocean Center (601); Daytona Beach, FL
*Non-conference game. ^{#}Rankings from AP poll. (#) Tournament seedings in parentheses. All times are in Eastern.
