= 2023–24 Saint Peter's Peacocks men's basketball team =

Basketball team season

2023–24 Saint Peter's Peacocks men's basketball

MAAC tournament champions

NCAA tournament, First Round
- Conference: Metro Atlantic Athletic Conference
- Record: 19–14 (12–8 MAAC)
- Head coach: Bashir Mason (2nd season)
- Assistant coaches: Pete Cipriano; Umar Shannon; Jim Mack
- Home arena: Run Baby Run Arena

2023–24 MAAC men's basketball standings
	Conf.				Overall
Team	W		L	PCT	W		L	PCT
Quinnipiac	15	–	5	.750	24	–	10	.706
Fairfield	14	–	6	.700	24	–	13	.649
Marist	12	–	8	.600	18	–	13	.581
Rider	12	–	8	.600	15	–	17	.469
Saint Peter's †	12	–	8	.600	19	–	14	.576
Niagara	11	–	9	.550	16	–	16	.500
Iona	10	–	10	.500	16	–	17	.485
Mount St. Mary's	9	–	11	.450	13	–	19	.406
Canisius	8	–	12	.400	14	–	18	.438
Manhattan	4	–	16	.200	7	–	23	.233
Siena	3	–	17	.150	4	–	28	.125
† 2024 MAAC tournament winner

The 2023–24 Saint Peter's Peacocks men's basketball team represented Saint Peter's University during the 2023–24 NCAA Division I men's basketball season. The Peacocks, led by second-year head coach Bashir Mason, played their home games at the Run Baby Run Arena in Jersey City, New Jersey, as members of the Metro Atlantic Athletic Conference. They finished the season 19–14, 12–8 in MAAC play to finish in a tie for third place. As the No. 5 seed in the MAAC Tournament, they defeated Rider, Quinnipiac, and Fairfield to win the MAAC tournament championship, as a result, they received the conference's automatic bid to the NCAA tournament for the fifth time in school history, and second time in 3 years. As a No. 15 seed in the Midwest region, they lost to Tennessee in the First Round.

== Previous season ==
The Peacocks finished the 2022–23 season 14–18, 7–13 in MAAC play to finish in tenth place. As the #10 seed in the MAAC tournament, they upset #7 seed Fairfield in the first round and #2 seed Rider in the quarterfinals, before falling to #11 seed Marist in the semifinals.

== Roster ==
2023–24 Saint Peter's Peacocks men's basketball team
Players
Coaches

Pos.	#	Name	Height	Weight	Year	Previous school	Hometown
G	0	Latrell Reid	6 ft 3 in (1.91 m)	185 lb (84 kg)	Sr	Coffeyville Community College	Willingboro, NJ
G	1	Brent Bland	6 ft 3 in (1.91 m)	205 lb (93 kg)	RS So	Half Hollow Hills West High School	Wheatley Heights, NY
G	2	Marcus Randolph	6 ft 5 in (1.96 m)	205 lb (93 kg)	Jr	Richmond	Willingboro, NJ
F	3	Corey Washington	6 ft 6 in (1.98 m)	180 lb (82 kg)	So	Sylvan Hills High School	Sherwood, AR
G	4	Roy Clarke	6 ft 4 in (1.93 m)	210 lb (95 kg)	Sr	St. Francis Brooklyn	Brooklyn, NY
G	5	Armoni Zeigler	6 ft 4 in (1.93 m)	185 lb (84 kg)	Fr	Our Saviour Lutheran School	Amityville, NY
G	6	Michael Houge	6 ft 7 in (2.01 m)	225 lb (102 kg)	Jr	Walters State Community College	Detroit, MI
G	7	Elijah Perkins	6 ft 4 in (1.93 m)	195 lb (88 kg)	So	Austin Peay	Middletown, NJ
G	10	Elijah Wood	6 ft 6 in (1.98 m)	180 lb (82 kg)	Jr	Colby Community College	Silver Spring, MD
G	11	Jaheim Tanksley	5 ft 10 in (1.78 m)	169 lb (77 kg)	Jr	Moberly Area Community College	Edison, NJ
F	15	Stephon Roberts	6 ft 10 in (2.08 m)	230 lb (104 kg)	Sr	Virginia State	Brooklyn, NY
F	24	Oumar Diahame	6 ft 10 in (2.08 m)	225 lb (102 kg)	Sr	The Patrick School	Dakar, Senegal
F	35	Mouhamed Sow	6 ft 9 in (2.06 m)	205 lb (93 kg)	RS So	The Patrick School	Dakar, Senegal

Head coach

- Bashir Mason (Drexel)

Assistant coach(es)

- Pete Cipriano (Southern)
- Umar Shannon (Saint Francis (PA))
- Jim Mack (Springfield)

Legend

- (C) Team captain
- (S) Suspended
- (I) Ineligible
- (W) Walk-on
- Injured
- Current redshirt

Roster
Last update: November 4, 2023

== Schedule and results ==
Date time, TV	Rank^{#}	Opponent^{#}	Result	Record	High points	High rebounds	High assists	Site (attendance) city, state
Regular season
November 6, 2023*; 7:30 pm, FS1		at Seton Hall	L 59–70	0–1	14 – Reid	6 – Sow	2 – Tied	Prudential Center (8,087); Newark, NJ
November 11, 2023*; 4:00 pm, ESPN+		at NJIT	W 75–48	1–1	23 – Washington	10 – Tied	4 – Reid	Wellness and Events Center (616); Newark, NJ
November 15, 2023*; 7:00 pm, YES		at Fairleigh Dickinson	L 70–71	1–2	19 – Houge	6 – Houge	9 – Reid	Rothman Center (1,852); Hackensack, NJ
November 20, 2023*; 7:00 pm, ESPN+		UMass Lowell	L 61–69	1–3	16 – Reid	5 – Sow	4 – Reid	Run Baby Run Arena (745); Jersey City, NJ
November 27, 2023*; 7:00 pm, B1G+		at Rutgers	L 40–71	1–4	16 – Houge	12 – Houge	2 – Clarke	Jersey Mike's Arena (8,000); Piscataway, NJ
December 1, 2023; 7:00 pm, ESPN+		at Niagara	W 72–67	2–4 (1–0)	19 – Houge	9 – Houge	3 – Bland	Gallagher Center (1,015); Lewiston, NY
December 3, 2023; 1:00 pm, ESPN+		at Canisius	W 54–52	3–4 (2–0)	10 – Reid	7 – Tied	4 – Reid	Koessler Athletic Center (795); Buffalo, NY
December 8, 2023*; 7:00 pm, ESPN+		at Duquesne	L 59–68	3–5	12 – Washington	6 – Houge	6 – Zeigler	UPMC Cooper Fieldhouse (2,088); Pittsburgh, PA
December 12, 2023*; 7:00 pm, ESPN+		UMBC	W 66–60	4–5	20 – Reid	8 – Sow	3 – Reid	Run Baby Run Arena (560); Jersey City, NJ
December 22, 2023*; 1:00 pm, ESPN+		Kean	W 73–70	5–5	26 – Washington	10 – Washington	6 – Reid	Run Baby Run Arena (463); Jersey City, NJ
December 30, 2023*; 2:00 pm, ESPN+		at Bucknell	W 67–58	6–5	16 – Reid	7 – Tied	3 – Tied	Sojka Pavilion (814); Lewisburg, PA
January 5, 2024; 7:00 pm, ESPN+		Iona	W 69–57	7–5 (3–0)	20 – Washington	9 – Washington	5 – Reid	Run Baby Run Arena (602); Jersey City, NJ
January 7, 2024; 2:00 pm, ESPN+		Mount St. Mary's	W 70–64	8–5 (4–0)	25 – Washington	7 – Reid	5 – Reid	Run Baby Run Arena; Jersey City, NJ
January 14, 2024; 2:00 pm, ESPN+		at Manhattan	W 81–68	9–5 (5–0)	17 – Washington	7 – Washington	11 – Reid	Draddy Gymnasium (880); Riverdale, NY
January 19, 2024; 7:00 pm, ESPN+		at Fairfield	L 67–76	9–6 (5–1)	16 – Washington	8 – Washington	3 – Tied	Leo D. Mahoney Arena (3,382); Fairfield, CT
January 21, 2024; 2:00 pm, ESPN+		Canisius	W 70–59	10–6 (6–1)	24 – Washington	9 – Washington	8 – Reid	Run Baby Run Arena; Jersey City, NJ
January 25, 2024; 7:00 pm, ESPN+		Rider	L 57–62	10–7 (6–2)	17 – Reid	9 – Zeigler	5 – Reid	Run Baby Run Arena; Jersey City, NJ
January 28, 2024; 2:00 pm, ESPN+		at Siena	W 63–52	11–7 (7–2)	21 – Reid	8 – Clarke	2 – Tied	MVP Arena (5,806); Albany, NY
February 2, 2024; 7:00 pm, ESPN+		Niagara	L 59–68 ^{OT}	11–8 (7–3)	21 – Clarke	8 – Sow	3 – Reid	Run Baby Run Arena (645); Jersey City, NJ
February 4, 2024; 2:00 pm, ESPN+		at Marist	L 52–63	11–9 (7–4)	14 – Reid	7 – Sow	3 – Clarke	McCann Arena (1,490); Poughkeepsie, NY
February 8, 2024; 7:00 pm, ESPN+		at Quinnipiac	L 73–84	11–10 (7–5)	17 – Clarke	5 – Tied	4 – Reid	M&T Bank Arena; Hamden, CT
February 10, 2024; 2:00 pm, ESPN+		Fairfield	L 62–64	11–11 (7–6)	21 – Clarke	6 – Bland	4 – Clarke	Run Baby Run Arena (644); Jersey City, NJ
February 16, 2024; 7:00 pm, ESPN+		Siena	W 75–63	12–11 (8–6)	29 – Washington	10 – Houge	7 – Reid	Run Baby Run Arena (563); Jersey City, NJ
February 18, 2024; 1:00 pm, ESPN+		at Iona	W 59–53	13–11 (9–6)	18 – Washington	10 – Washington	6 – Clarke	Hynes Athletics Center (1,808); New Rochelle, NY
February 23, 2024; 7:00 pm, ESPN+		at Mount St. Mary's	W 70–65	14–11 (10–6)	25 – Washington	8 – Tied	6 – Reid	Knott Arena (2,061); Emmitsburg, MD
February 25, 2024; 3:00 pm, ESPN+		Marist	W 69–60	15–11 (11–6)	19 – Washington	5 – Washington	7 – Reid	Run Baby Run Arena (572); Jersey City, NJ
March 3, 2024; 2:00 pm, ESPN+		Manhattan	W 89–57	16–11 (12–6)	18 – Washington	9 – Tied	17 – Reid	Run Baby Run Arena (684); Jersey City, NJ
March 7, 2024; 8:00 pm, ESPN+		at Rider	L 56–61	16–12 (12–7)	22 – Washington	12 – Washington	4 – Reid	Alumni Gymnasium (1,650); Lawrenceville, NJ
March 9, 2024; 2:00 pm, ESPN+		Quinnipiac	L 74–89	16–13 (12–8)	21 – Washington	7 – Washington	4 – Reid	Run Baby Run Arena (755); Jersey City, NJ
MAAC tournament
March 14, 2024; 9:00 pm, ESPN+	(5)	vs. (4) Rider; Quarterfinals	W 50–48	17–13	20 – Houge	11 – Reid	2 – Clarke	Boardwalk Hall (1,544); Atlantic City, NJ
March 15, 2024; 6:30 pm, ESPNews	(5)	vs. (1) Quinnipiac; Semifinals	W 62–60	18–13	15 – Sow	7 – Washington	3 – Tied	Boardwalk Hall (−); Atlantic City, NJ
March 16, 2024; 7:30 pm, ESPNU	(5)	vs. (2) Fairfield; Championship	W 68–63	19–13	24 – Washington	9 – Washington	4 – Reid	Boardwalk Hall (2,477); Atlantic City, NJ
NCAA tournament
March 21, 2024; 9:20 p.m., TNT	(15 MW)	vs. (2 MW) No. 6 Tennessee; First Round	L 49–83	19–14	17 – Reid	5 – Roberts	1 – Tied	Spectrum Center (18,037); Charlotte, NC
*Non-conference game. ^{#}Rankings from AP Poll. (#) Tournament seedings in parentheses. MW=Midwest region. All times are in Eastern.
