= 2023–24 Quinnipiac Bobcats men's basketball team =

American college basketball season

2023–24 Quinnipiac Bobcats men's basketball
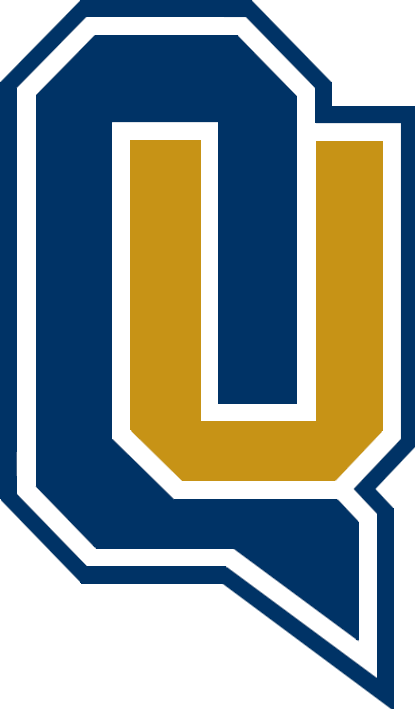

MAAC regular season champions

CBI, First Round
- Conference: Metro Atlantic Athletic Conference
- Record: 24–10 (15–5 MAAC)
- Head coach: Tom Pecora (1st season)
- Associate head coach: Shaun Morris
- Assistant coaches: Bradley Jacks; Tahar Sutton
- Home arena: M&T Bank Arena

2023–24 MAAC men's basketball standings
	Conf.				Overall
Team	W		L	PCT	W		L	PCT
Quinnipiac	15	–	5	.750	24	–	10	.706
Fairfield	14	–	6	.700	24	–	13	.649
Marist	12	–	8	.600	18	–	13	.581
Rider	12	–	8	.600	15	–	17	.469
Saint Peter's †	12	–	8	.600	19	–	14	.576
Niagara	11	–	9	.550	16	–	16	.500
Iona	10	–	10	.500	16	–	17	.485
Mount St. Mary's	9	–	11	.450	13	–	19	.406
Canisius	8	–	12	.400	14	–	18	.438
Manhattan	4	–	16	.200	7	–	23	.233
Siena	3	–	17	.150	4	–	28	.125
† 2024 MAAC tournament winner

The 2023–24 Quinnipiac Bobcats men's basketball team represented Quinnipiac University during the 2023–24 NCAA Division I men's basketball season. The Bobcats, led by first-year head coach Tom Pecora, played their home games at M&T Bank Arena in Hamden, Connecticut as members of the Metro Atlantic Athletic Conference.

== Previous season ==
The Bobcats finished the 2022–23 season 20–12, 11–9 in MAAC play, to finish in a tie for third place. As the #3 seed in the MAAC tournament, they were upset by #11 seed Marist in the quarterfinals.

On April 13, 2023, head coach Baker Dunleavy resigned, in order to take the newly created position of general manager of basketball at his alma mater, Villanova. Special assistant to the head coach Tom Pecora was immediately elevated to be the team's next head coach.

== Roster ==
2023–24 Quinnipiac Bobcats men's basketball team
Players
Coaches

Pos.	#	Name	Height	Weight	Year	Previous school	Hometown
G/F	0	Alexis Reyes	6 ft 7 in (2.01 m)	195 lb (88 kg)	Jr	East Carolina	Roxbury, MA
F	1	Richie Springs	6 ft 9 in (2.06 m)	235 lb (107 kg)	RS Sr	UConn	Brooklyn, NY
G	2	Matt Balanc	6 ft 4 in (1.93 m)	195 lb (88 kg)	GS	Springbrook High School	Silver Spring, MD
G	3	Savion Lewis	6 ft 1 in (1.85 m)	175 lb (79 kg)	GS	Half Hollow Hills East High School	Dix Hills, NY
G	4	Khaden Bennett	6 ft 4 in (1.93 m)	185 lb (84 kg)	Fr	Choate Rosemary Hall	Grand Prairie, TX
G	5	Doug Young	6 ft 0 in (1.83 m)	175 lb (79 kg)	Jr	Midland College	Houston, TX
G	10	Nicholas Margetson	6 ft 1 in (1.85 m)	178 lb (81 kg)	Sr	Holy Trinity High School	Dix Hills, New York
G	11	Arion Lewis	6 ft 3 in (1.91 m)	175 lb (79 kg)	Sr	Delaware State	Philadelphia, PA
F	12	Rihards Vavers	6 ft 7 in (2.01 m)	195 lb (88 kg)	Fr	The Skill Factory	Ādaži, Latvia
G/F	13	Daemar Kelly	6 ft 5 in (1.96 m)	190 lb (86 kg)	Fr	Penn Hills High School	Pittsburgh, PA
G	14	Quinn Guth	6 ft 2 in (1.88 m)	185 lb (84 kg)	Jr	Kimball Union Academy	Brookfield, CT
F	15	Amarri Tice	6 ft 7 in (2.01 m)	220 lb (100 kg)	So	Wofford	Newburgh, NY
F	23	JJ Riggins	6 ft 6 in (1.98 m)	245 lb (111 kg)	RS Sr	Imhotep Charter High School	Philadelphia, PA
F	33	Paul Otieno	6 ft 8 in (2.03 m)	225 lb (102 kg)	Sr	Kilgore College	Nairobi, Kenya

Head coach

- Tom Pecora (Adelphi)

Assistant coach(es)

- Shaun Morris (Lycoming)
- Bradley Jacks (Babson)
- Tahar Sutton (Wilmington)

Legend

- (C) Team captain
- (S) Suspended
- (I) Ineligible
- (W) Walk-on
- Injured
- Current redshirt

Roster
Last update: November 21, 2023

== Schedule and results ==
Date time, TV	Rank^{#}	Opponent^{#}	Result	Record	Site (attendance) city, state
Regular season
November 6, 2023*; 7:30 pm, ESPN+		Coast Guard	W 116–48	1–0	M&T Bank Arena (898); Hamden, CT
November 10, 2023*; 4:00 pm, ESPN+		Central Connecticut	W 74–70	2–0	M&T Bank Arena (1,112); Hamden, CT
November 13, 2023*; 7:00 pm, NESN/ESPN+		at UMass	L 81–102	2–1	Mullins Center (2,382); Amherst, MA
November 17, 2023*; 5:00 pm, ESPN+		at Army	W 67–58	3–1	Christl Arena (934); West Point, NY
November 19, 2023*; 2:00 pm, ESPN+		Albany	W 85–82	4–1	M&T Bank Arena (763); Hamden, CT
November 26, 2023*; 2:00 pm, ESPN+		Stonehill	W 80–69	5–1	M&T Bank Arena (877); Hamden, CT
December 1, 2023; 7:00 pm, ESPN+		at Canisius	L 73–93	5–2 (0–1)	Koessler Athletic Center (1,084); Buffalo, NY
December 3, 2023; 2:00 pm, ESPN+		at Niagara	W 75–68 ^{OT}	6–2 (1–1)	Gallagher Center (872); Lewiston, NY
December 8, 2023*; 7:00 pm, ESPN+		Navy	W 71–68	7–2	M&T Bank Arena (1,221); Hamden, CT
December 11, 2023*; 7:00 pm, ESPN+		Yale	L 66–73	7–3	M&T Bank Arena (1,156); Hamden, CT
December 18, 2023*; 7:00 pm, ESPN+		at Holy Cross	W 77–57	8–3	Hart Center (654); Worcester, MA
December 21, 2023*; 2:00 pm, ESPN+		at Lafayette	W 78–60	9–3	Kirby Sports Center (864); Easton, PA
December 30, 2023*; 1:00 pm, SECN		at Florida	L 72–97	9–4	O'Connell Center (9,869); Gainesville, FL
January 5, 2024; 7:30 pm, ESPN+		Rider	W 88–84	10–4 (2–1)	M&T Bank Arena (887); Hamden, CT
January 7, 2024; 2:00 pm, ESPN+		Manhattan	W 76–59	11–4 (3–1)	M&T Bank Arena (738); Hamden, CT
January 12, 2024; 7:00 pm, ESPN+		at Marist	W 66–55	12–4 (4–1)	McCann Arena (1,595); Poughkeepsie, NY
January 19, 2024; 7:00 pm, ESPN+		at Siena	W 82-70	13–4 (5–1)	MVP Arena (4,845); Albany, NY
January 21, 2024; 2:00 pm, ESPN+		Iona	W 91-87	14–4 (6–1)	M&T Bank Arena (1,631); Hamden, CT
January 25, 2024; 7:30 pm, ESPN+		Mount St. Mary's	W 79–65	15–4 (7–1)	M&T Bank Arena (929); Hamden, CT
January 28, 2024; 2:00 pm, ESPN+		at Fairfield	W 66–64	16–4 (8–1)	Leo D. Mahoney Arena (3,137); Fairfield, CT
February 2, 2024; 7:00 pm, ESPN+		at Manhattan	W 76–59	17–4 (9–1)	Draddy Gymnasium (787); Riverdale, NY
February 4, 2024; 2:00 pm, ESPN+		Canisius	W 88–63	18–4 (10–1)	M&T Bank Arena (1,747); Hamden, CT
February 8, 2024; 7:00 pm, ESPN+		Saint Peter's	W 84–73	19–4 (11–1)	M&T Bank Arena; Hamden, CT
February 10, 2024; 4:00 pm, ESPN+		at Mount St. Mary's	L 79–96	19–5 (11–2)	Knott Arena (2,166); Emmitsburg, MD
February 18, 2024; 2:00 pm, ESPN+		Niagara	L 66–80	19–6 (11–3)	M&T Bank Arena (1,987); Hamden, CT
February 23, 2024; 7:00 pm, ESPN+		Fairfield	L 81–85	19–7 (11–4)	M&T Bank Arena (3,570); Hamden, CT
February 25, 2024; 2:00 pm, ESPN+		at Rider	L 78–88	19–8 (11–5)	Alumni Gymnasium (1,614); Lawrenceville, NJ
March 1, 2024; 7:00 pm, ESPN+		at Iona	W 82–64	20–8 (12–5)	Hynes Athletics Center (1,846); New Rochelle, NY
March 3, 2024; 2:00 pm, ESPN+		Siena	W 71–57	21–8 (13–5)	M&T Bank Arena (1,995); Hamden, CT
March 7, 2024; 7:00 pm, ESPN+		Marist	W 73–64	22–8 (14–5)	M&T Bank Arena (1,249); Hamden, CT
March 9, 2024; 2:00 pm, ESPN+		at Saint Peter's	W 89–74	23–8 (15–5)	Run Baby Run Arena (755); Jersey City, NJ
MAAC tournament
March 13, 2024; 6:30 pm, ESPN+	(1)	vs. (9) Canisius; Quarterfinals	W 76–52	24–8	Boardwalk Hall (1,443); Atlantic City, NJ
March 15, 2024; 6:30 pm, ESPNews	(1)	vs. (5) Saint Peter's; Semifinals	L 60–62	24–9	Boardwalk Hall; Atlantic City, NJ
CBI
March 24, 2024; 3:30 p.m., FloHoops	(6)	vs. (11) Evansville; First round	L 63–64	24–10	Ocean Center (829); Daytona Beach, FL
*Non-conference game. ^{#}Rankings from AP poll. (#) Tournament seedings in parentheses. All times are in Eastern.
