= 2023–24 Niagara Purple Eagles men's basketball team =

American college basketball season

2023–24 Niagara Purple Eagles men's basketball
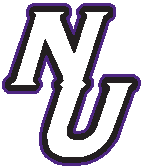
- Conference: Metro Atlantic Athletic Conference
- Record: 16–16 (11–9 MAAC)
- Head coach: Greg Paulus (5th season)
- Associate head coach: Kevin Devitt
- Assistant coaches: Tyler Kelly; Chris Buchanan; Austin Kelley
- Home arena: Gallagher Center

2023–24 MAAC men's basketball standings
	Conf.				Overall
Team	W		L	PCT	W		L	PCT
Quinnipiac	15	–	5	.750	24	–	10	.706
Fairfield	14	–	6	.700	24	–	13	.649
Marist	12	–	8	.600	18	–	13	.581
Rider	12	–	8	.600	15	–	17	.469
Saint Peter's †	12	–	8	.600	19	–	14	.576
Niagara	11	–	9	.550	16	–	16	.500
Iona	10	–	10	.500	16	–	17	.485
Mount St. Mary's	9	–	11	.450	13	–	19	.406
Canisius	8	–	12	.400	14	–	18	.438
Manhattan	4	–	16	.200	7	–	23	.233
Siena	3	–	17	.150	4	–	28	.125
† 2024 MAAC tournament winner

The 2023–24 Niagara Purple Eagles men's basketball team represented Niagara University during the 2023–24 NCAA Division I men's basketball season. The Purple Eagles, led by fifth-year head coach Greg Paulus, played their home games at the Gallagher Center in Lewiston, New York as members of the Metro Atlantic Athletic Conference (MAAC). The Purple Eagles finished the season 16–16, 11–9 in MAAC play, to finish in sixth place. They defeated Siena in the first round of the MAAC tournament before losing to Marist in the quarterfinals.

== Previous season ==
The Purple Eagles finished the 2022–23 season 16–15, 10–10 in MAAC play, to finish in a tie for fifth place. They defeated Siena in the quarterfinals of the MAAC tournament before falling to top-seeded and eventual champions Iona in the quarterfinals.

== Roster ==
2023–24 Niagara Purple Eagles men's basketball team
Players
Coaches

Pos.	#	Name	Height	Weight	Year	Previous school	Hometown
G	1	Randy Tucker	6 ft 4 in (1.93 m)	—	GS	Green Bay	Rock Island, IL
G	2	Lance Erving	6 ft 3 in (1.91 m)	190 lb (86 kg)	Sr	Chipola College	Leesburg, FL
G	4	Braxton Bayless	6 ft 2 in (1.88 m)	185 lb (84 kg)	Sr	Indian Hills Community College	Ankeny, IA
G	5	Luke Bumbalough	6 ft 1 in (1.85 m)	180 lb (82 kg)	GS	Ball State	New Castle, IN
G	10	Jalen Brown	5 ft 10 in (1.78 m)	160 lb (73 kg)	So	De La Salle Institute	Chicago, IL
G	11	Ahmad II Henderson	5 ft 9 in (1.75 m)	155 lb (70 kg)	Fr	Brother Rice High School	Monee, IL
G	12	Kwane II Marble	6 ft 5 in (1.96 m)	195 lb (88 kg)	GS	Loyola Marymount	Denver, CO
G	13	Dre Bullock	6 ft 6 in (1.98 m)	190 lb (86 kg)	Jr	Louisiana Tech	Franklinton, NC
F	15	Yaw Obeng-Mensah	6 ft 7 in (2.01 m)	215 lb (98 kg)	Sr	UMBC	Toronto, ON
G	20	Malik Edwards	6 ft 2 in (1.88 m)	180 lb (82 kg)	Jr	William Penn	Philadelphia, PA
F	24	Aime Rutayisire	6 ft 8 in (2.03 m)	230 lb (104 kg)	So	Barton Community College	Adelaide, Australia
F	55	Harlan Obioha	7 ft 0 in (2.13 m)	280 lb (127 kg)	So	Hoxie High School	Hoxie, KS

Head coach

- Greg Paulus (Duke)

Assistant coach(es)

- Kevin Devitt (DePaul)
- Tyler Kelly (Florida Southern)
- Chris Buchanan (Peninsula)
- Austin Kelley (St. Bonaventure)

Legend

- (C) Team captain
- (S) Suspended
- (I) Ineligible
- (W) Walk-on
- Injured
- Current redshirt

Roster
Last update: November 7, 2023

== Schedule and results ==
Date time, TV	Rank^{#}	Opponent^{#}	Result	Record	Site (attendance) city, state
Regular season
November 6, 2023*; 7:00 p.m., ACCNX/ESPN+		at Notre Dame	L 63–70	0–1	Joyce Center (7,338); Notre Dame, IN
November 11, 2023*; 7:00 p.m., ESPN+		Bucknell	L 64–73	0–2	Gallagher Center (1,239); Lewiston, NY
November 16, 2023*; 7:00 p.m., ESPN+		at Hawai'i	L 73–92	0–3	Stan Sheriff Center (3,748); Honolulu, HI
November 25, 2023*; 4:00 p.m., ESPN+		at Saint Francis (PA)	W 69–61	1–3	DeGol Arena (351); Loretto, PA
December 1, 2023; 7:00 p.m., ESPN+		Saint Peter's	L 67–72	1–4 (0–1)	Gallagher Center (1,015); Lewiston, NY
December 3, 2023; 2:00 p.m., ESPN+		Quinnipiac	L 68–75 ^{OT}	1–5 (0–2)	Gallagher Center (872); Lewiston, NY
December 6, 2023*; 7:00 p.m., ESPN+		St. Bonaventure	L 60–94	1–6	Gallagher Center (1,494); Lewiston, NY
December 10, 2023*; 2:00 p.m., ESPN+		Buffalo State	W 113–64	2–6	Gallagher Center (587); Lewiston, NY
December 16, 2023*; 1:00 p.m., ESPN+		NJIT	W 89–81	3–6	Gallagher Center (362); Lewiston, NY
December 19, 2023*; 6:00 p.m., ESPN+		at Binghamton	L 69–74	3–7	Binghamton University Events Center (1,533); Vestal, NY
December 21, 2023*; 7:00 p.m., ESPN+/ACCNX		at Syracuse	L 71–83	3–8	JMA Wireless Dome (18,239); Syracuse, NY
December 29, 2023*; 7:00 p.m., ESPN+		at Buffalo	W 69–63	4–8	Alumni Arena (4,663); Amherst, NY
January 5, 2024; 7:00 p.m., ESPN+		at Manhattan	W 81–67	5–8 (1–2)	Draddy Gymnasium (487); Riverdale, NY
January 7, 2024; 1:00 p.m., ESPN+		at Iona	W 75–73	6–8 (2–2)	Hynes Athletics Center (2,001); New Rochelle, NY
January 12, 2024; 7:00 p.m., ESPN+		Fairfield	W 96–72	7–8 (3–2)	Gallagher Center (995); Lewiston, NY
January 15, 2024; 12:00 p.m., ESPN+		Siena	L 88–93	7–9 (3–3)	Gallagher Center (724); Lewiston, NY
January 19, 2024; 7:00 p.m., ESPN+		at Rider	W 78–74	8–9 (4–3)	Alumni Gymnasium (1,014); Lawrenceville, NJ
January 21, 2024; 2:00 p.m., ESPN+		at Mount St. Mary's	W 82–71	9–9 (5–3)	Knott Arena (2,412); Emmitsburg, MD
January 26, 2024; 7:00 p.m., ESPN+		Marist	W 67–62	10–9 (6–3)	Gallagher Center (1,687); Lewiston, NY
January 28, 2024; 2:00 p.m., ESPN+		Manhattan	L 78–84 ^{OT}	10–10 (6–4)	Gallagher Center (905); Lewiston, NY
February 2, 2024; 7:00 p.m., ESPN+		at Saint Peter's	W 68–59 ^{OT}	11–10 (7–4)	Run Baby Run Arena (645); Jersey City, NJ
February 6, 2024; 7:00 p.m., ESPN+		Canisius; Battle of the Bridge	W 69–64	12–10 (8–4)	Gallagher Center (1,295); Lewiston, NY
February 8, 2024; 7:00 p.m., ESPN+		Iona	L 71–74	12–11 (8–5)	Gallagher Center (1,041); Lewiston, NY
February 16, 2024; 7:00 p.m., ESPN+		at Fairfield	W 65–63	13–11 (9–5)	Leo D. Mahoney Arena (1,952); Fairfield, CT
February 18, 2024; 2:00 p.m., ESPN+		at Quinnipiac	W 80–66	14–11 (10–5)	M&T Bank Arena (1,987); Hamden, CT
February 23, 2024; 7:00 p.m., ESPN+		at Canisius; Battle of the Bridge	L 59–69	14–12 (10–6)	Koessler Athletic Center (1,501); Buffalo, NY
March 1, 2024; 7:00 p.m., ESPN+		Rider	L 61–71	14–13 (10–7)	Gallagher Center (1,353); Lewiston, NY
March 3, 2024; 2:00 p.m., ESPN+		Mount St. Mary's	L 72–91	14–14 (10–8)	Gallagher Center (1,077); Lewiston, NY
March 7, 2024; 7:00 p.m., ESPN+		at Siena	W 66–59	15–14 (11–8)	MVP Arena (4,817); Albany, NY
March 9, 2024; 2:00 p.m., ESPN+		at Marist	L 62–63	15–15 (11–9)	McCann Arena (1,277); Poughkeepsie, NY
MAAC tournament
March 12, 2024; 9:45 p.m., ESPN+	(6)	vs. (11) Siena; First round	W 67–65	16–15	Boardwalk Hall (1,717); Atlantic City, NJ
March 14, 2024; 6:30 p.m., ESPN+	(6)	vs. (3) Marist; Quarterfinals	L 59–65	16–16	Boardwalk Hall; Atlantic City, NJ
*Non-conference game. ^{#}Rankings from AP poll. (#) Tournament seedings in parentheses. All times are in Eastern.
