= Bashir Mason =

American basketball player and coach (born 1984)

Current position
- Title: Head coach
- Team: Saint Peter's
- Conference: MAAC
- Record: 62–66 (.484)

Biographical details
- Born: February 11, 1984 (age 42)

Playing career
- 2003–2007: Drexel
- Position: Point guard

Coaching career (HC unless noted)
- 2008–2010: Marist (asst.)
- 2010–2012: Wagner (asst.)
- 2012–2022: Wagner
- 2022–present: Saint Peter's

Head coaching record
- Overall: 227–196 (.537)
- Tournaments: 0–1 (NCAA tournament); 1–2 (NIT); 9–9 (NEC)

Accomplishments and honors

Championships
- 3× NEC regular season (2016, 2018, 2021); MAAC tournament (2024)

Awards
- 3× NEC Coach of the Year (2016, 2018, 2021)

Bashir Mason (born February 11, 1984) is an American college basketball coach and current head men's basketball coach at Saint Peter's University.

He was previously an assistant coach at Marist College in 2008, and an assistant coach at Wagner College in 2010.

Mason played high school basketball at St. Benedict's Preparatory School, then joined head coach Bruiser Flint to play college basketball at Drexel University. He was a four-year starter for the Dragons, scoring over 1,000 points and handing out 471 assists as a point guard. He was a Colonial Athletic Association (CAA) all-defensive player every season, as well as the CAA's defensive player of the year as a freshman.

Mason was hired by Wagner in March 2012, as their 18th men's head basketball coach. At the time of his hiring, Mason was the youngest coach in NCAA Division I basketball at 28. He guided Wagner to three regular season titles, as well as their first-ever postseason win, defeating St. Bonaventure in the 2016 National Invitation Tournament. He finished his ten seasons at Wagner with a 165–130 record.

Mason was hired as Saint Peter's 16th men's head basketball coach on April 12, 2022. He replaced Shaheen Holloway when he left Saint Peter's for Seton Hall on March 30, 2022.

== Head coaching record ==
Record table
Season	Team	Overall	Conference	Standing	Postseason
Wagner Seahawks (Northeast Conference) (2012–2022)
2012–13	Wagner	19–12	12–6	2nd	
2013–14	Wagner	19–12	12–4	2nd	
2014–15	Wagner	10–20	8–10	T–7th	
2015–16	Wagner	23–11	13–5	1st	NIT Second Round
2016–17	Wagner	16–14	11–7	3rd	
2017–18	Wagner	23–10	14–4	1st	NIT First Round
2018–19	Wagner	13–17	8–10	7th	
2019–20	Wagner	8–21	5–13	10th	
2020–21	Wagner	13–7	13–5	1st	
2021–22	Wagner	21–6	15–3	2nd	
Wagner:		165–130 (.559)	111–67 (.624)		
Saint Peter's Peacocks (Metro Atlantic Athletic Conference) (2022–2026)
2022–23	Saint Peter's	14–18	7–13	10th	
2023–24	Saint Peter's	19–14	12–8	T–3rd	NCAA Division I Round of 64
2024–25	Saint Peter's	12–16	7–13	11th	
2025–26	Saint Peter's	17–12	14–6	2nd	
Saint Peter's Peacocks (Metro Conference) (2026–present)
2026–27	Saint Peter's	0–6	0–0		
Saint Peter's:		62–66 (.484)	40–40 (.500)		
Total:		227–196 (.537)			
National champion Postseason invitational champion Conference regular season champion Conference regular season and conference tournament champion Division regular season champion Division regular season and conference tournament champion Conference tournament champion
