= 2024 College Basketball Invitational =

Single elimination college basketball tournament

- Season: 2023–24
- Teams: 15 (16 planned)
- Finals site: Ocean Center, Daytona Beach, Florida
- Champions: Seattle Redhawks (1st title)
- Runner-up: High Point Panthers (1st title game)
- Semifinalists: Arkansas State Red Wolves (1st Final Four); Fairfield Stags (1st Final Four)
- Winning coach: Chris Victor (1st title)
- MVP: Cameron Tyson (Seattle)
- Attendance: 3,620 (overall); 671 (final)

The 2024 College Basketball Invitational (CBI) was a single-elimination, fully-bracketed men's college basketball postseason tournament featuring fifteen National Collegiate Athletic Association (NCAA) Division I teams not selected to participate in the NCAA Division I men's basketball tournament or the National Invitation Tournament (NIT). The 16th edition of the tournament began on March 23 and concluded March 27. All games were played at Ocean Center in Daytona Beach, Florida and the semifinal and championship games aired on ESPN2. The tournament was won by Seattle.

== Participating teams ==
Teams in the CBI will be seeded 1–15.
Note: Team records are before playing in the tournament

Seed	Team	Conference	Record	Appearance	Last bid
1	High Point	Big South	25–8 (.758)	1st	Never
2	UC San Diego	Big West	21–11 (.656)	1st	Never
3	Seattle	Western Athletic	19–14 (.576)	4th	2018
4	Arkansas State	Sun Belt	18–16 (.529)	1st	Never
5	Montana	Big Sky	23–11 (.676)	3rd	2016
6	Quinnipiac	Metro Atlantic Athletic	24–9 (.727)	2nd	2012
7	Fairfield	Metro Atlantic Athletic	22–12 (.647)	1st	Never
8	Northern Colorado	Big Sky	19–13 (.594)	2nd	2022
9	Cleveland State	Horizon	20–14 (.588)	2nd	2023
10	Little Rock	Ohio Valley	21–12 (.636)	1st	Never
11	Evansville	Missouri Valley	16–17 (.485)	3rd	2012
12	Presbyterian	Big South	14–18 (.438)	1st	Never
13	Bethune–Cookman	Southwestern Athletic	17–16 (.515)	1st	Never
14	Delaware State	Mid-Eastern Athletic	15–18 (.455)	2nd	2015
15	Chicago State	Independent	12–18 (.400)	1st	Never

== Schedule ==
Game	Time	Matchup	Score	Box score	Attendance	Television
First round – Saturday, March 23
1	1:00 p.m.	#4 Arkansas State vs. #13 Bethune–Cookman	86–85		795	FloHoops
2	3:30 p.m.	#2 UC San Diego vs. #15 Chicago State	75–77		795	FloHoops
3	5:30 p.m.	#3 Seattle vs. #14 Delaware State	79–66		795	FloHoops
First round – Sunday, March 24
4	11:00 a.m.	#8 Northern Colorado vs. #9 Cleveland State	49–51		829	FloHoops
5	1:00 p.m.	#5 Montana vs. #12 Presbyterian	82–79 ^{OT}		829	FloHoops
6	3:30 p.m.	#7 Fairfield vs. #10 Little Rock	82–75		829	FloHoops
7	5:30 p.m.	#6 Quinnipiac vs. #11 Evansville	63–64		829	FloHoops
Quarterfinals – Monday, March 25
8	12:00 p.m.	#1 High Point vs. #9 Cleveland State	93–74		724	FloHoops
9	2:00 p.m.	#4 Arkansas State vs. #5 Montana	74–61		724	FloHoops
10	4:30 p.m.	#7 Fairfield vs. #15 Chicago State	77–74		724	FloHoops
11	6:30 p.m.	#3 Seattle vs. #11 Evansville	71–57		724	FloHoops
Semifinals – Tuesday, March 26
12	7:00 p.m.	#1 High Point vs. #4 Arkansas State	81–80		601	ESPN2
13	9:00 p.m.	#3 Seattle vs. #7 Fairfield	75–58		601	ESPN2
Final – Wednesday, March 27
14	5:00 p.m.	#1 High Point vs. #3 Seattle	67–77		671	ESPN2
Game times in Eastern Daylight Time; (#) ranking denotes tournament seed.

== Bracket ==
First round March 23 & 24
8	Northern Colorado	49
9	Cleveland State	51
4	Arkansas State	86
13	Bethune–Cookman	85
5	Montana	82
12	Presbyterian	79 ^{OT}
2	UC San Diego	75
15	Chicago State	77
7	Fairfield	82
10	Little Rock	75
3	Seattle	79
14	Delaware State	66
6	Quinnipiac	63
11	Evansville	64

Quarterfinals; March 25
1	High Point	93
9	Cleveland State	74
4	Arkansas State	74
5	Montana	61
15	Chicago State	74
7	Fairfield	77
3	Seattle	71
11	Evansville	57

Semifinals; March 26
1	High Point	81
4	Arkansas State	80
7	Fairfield	58
3	Seattle	75

Final; March 27
1	High Point	67
3	Seattle	77
