= 2024 MAAC men's basketball tournament =

American college basketball postseason tournament

- Classification: Division I
- Season: 2023–24
- Teams: 11
- Site: Jim Whelan Boardwalk Hall; Atlantic City, New Jersey
- Champions: Saint Peter's (5th title)
- Winning coach: Bashir Mason (1st title)
- Attendance: 8,964 (total); 2,477 (championship)
- Television: ESPN+, ESPNEWS, ESPNU

2023–24 MAAC men's basketball standings
| | Conf. | | | | Overall |
| Team | W | | L | PCT | W | | L | PCT |
|---|---|---|---|---|---|---|---|---|
| Quinnipiac | 15 | – | 5 | .750 | 24 | – | 10 | .706 |
| Fairfield | 14 | – | 6 | .700 | 24 | – | 13 | .649 |
| Marist | 12 | – | 8 | .600 | 18 | – | 13 | .581 |
| Rider | 12 | – | 8 | .600 | 15 | – | 17 | .469 |
| Saint Peter's † | 12 | – | 8 | .600 | 19 | – | 14 | .576 |
| Niagara | 11 | – | 9 | .550 | 16 | – | 16 | .500 |
| Iona | 10 | – | 10 | .500 | 16 | – | 17 | .485 |
| Mount St. Mary's | 9 | – | 11 | .450 | 13 | – | 19 | .406 |
| Canisius | 8 | – | 12 | .400 | 14 | – | 18 | .438 |
| Manhattan | 4 | – | 16 | .200 | 7 | – | 23 | .233 |
| Siena | 3 | – | 17 | .150 | 4 | – | 28 | .125 |
† 2024 MAAC tournament winner

The 2024 Metro Atlantic Athletic Conference men's basketball tournament will be the postseason men's basketball tournament for the Metro Atlantic Athletic Conference for the 2023–24 NCAA Division I men's basketball season. The tournament will be played March 12–16, 2024, at the Jim Whelan Boardwalk Hall in Atlantic City, New Jersey, for the fifth year in a row. The tournament winner will receive the conference's automatic bid to the 2024 NCAA Division I men's basketball tournament.

== Seeds ==
All 11 teams in the conference are scheduled participated in the Tournament. The top five teams will receive byes to the quarterfinals. Teams will be seeded by record within the conference, with a tiebreaker system to seed teams with identical conference records.

| Seed | School | Conference | Tiebreaker |
|---|---|---|---|
| 1 | Quinnipiac | 15–5 | |
| 2 | Fairfield | 14–6 | |
| 3 | Marist | 12–8 | 3–1 vs. Rider/Saint Peter's |
| 4 | Rider | 12–8 | 2–2 vs. Marist/Saint Peter's |
| 5 | Saint Peter's | 12–8 | 1–3 vs. Marist/Rider |
| 6 | Niagara | 11–9 | |
| 7 | Iona | 10–10 | |
| 8 | Mount St. Mary's | 9–11 | |
| 9 | Canisius | 8–12 | |
| 10 | Manhattan | 4–16 | |
| 11 | Siena | 3–17 | |

== Schedule ==
| Session | Game | Time* | Matchup | Score | Television | Attendance |
First round – Tuesday, March 12
| 1 | 1 | 5:15 pm | No. 8 Mount St. Mary's vs No. 9 Canisius | 61–77 | ESPN+ | 1,717 |
| 1 | 2 | 7:30 pm | No. 7 Iona vs No. 10 Manhattan | 59–57 | ESPN+ | 1,717 |
| 1 | 3 | 9:45 pm | No. 6 Niagara vs No. 11 Siena | 67–65 | ESPN+ | 1,717 |
Quarterfinals – Wednesday, March 13
| 2 | 4 | 6:30 pm | No. 1 Quinnipiac vs No. 9 Canisius | 76–52 | ESPN+ | 1,443 |
| 2 | 5 | 9:00 pm | No. 2 Fairfield vs No. 7 Iona | 68–63 | ESPN+ | 1,443 |
Quarterfinals – Thursday, March 14
| 3 | 6 | 6:30 pm | No. 3 Marist vs No.6 Niagara | 65–59 | ESPN+ | 1,544 |
| 3 | 7 | 9:00 pm | No. 4 Rider vs No. 5 Saint Peter's | 48–50 | ESPN+ | 1,544 |
Semifinals – Friday, March 15
| 4 | 8 | 6:30 pm | No. 1 Quinnipiac vs No. 5 Saint Peter's | 60–62 | ESPNEWS | 1,783 |
| 4 | 9 | 9:00 pm | No. 2 Fairfield vs No. 3 Marist | 65–61 | ESPNEWS | 1,783 |
Championship – Saturday, March 16
| 5 | 10 | 7:30 pm | No. 5 Saint Peter's vs No. 2 Fairfield | 68–63 | ESPNU | 2,477 |
*Game times in ET. Rankings denote tournament seeding.

== Bracket ==
First round Tuesday, March 12
8 | Mount St. Mary's | 61
9 | Canisius | 77
7 | Iona | 59
10 | Manhattan | 57
6 | Niagara | 67
11 | Siena | 65

Quarterfinals; Wednesday & Thursday, March 13/14
1 | Quinnipiac | 76
9 | Canisius | 52
4 | Rider | 48
5 | Saint Peter's | 50
2 | Fairfield | 68
7 | Iona | 63
3 | Marist | 65
6 | Niagara | 59

Semifinals; Friday, March 15
1 | Quinnipiac | 60
5 | Saint Peter's | 62
2 | Fairfield | 65
3 | Marist | 61

Championship; Saturday, March 16
5 | Saint Peter's | 68
2 | Fairfield | 63

== See also ==
- 2024 MAAC women's basketball tournament
