= Knott Arena =

Sports arena at Mount Saint Mary's University

- Jim Phelan Court
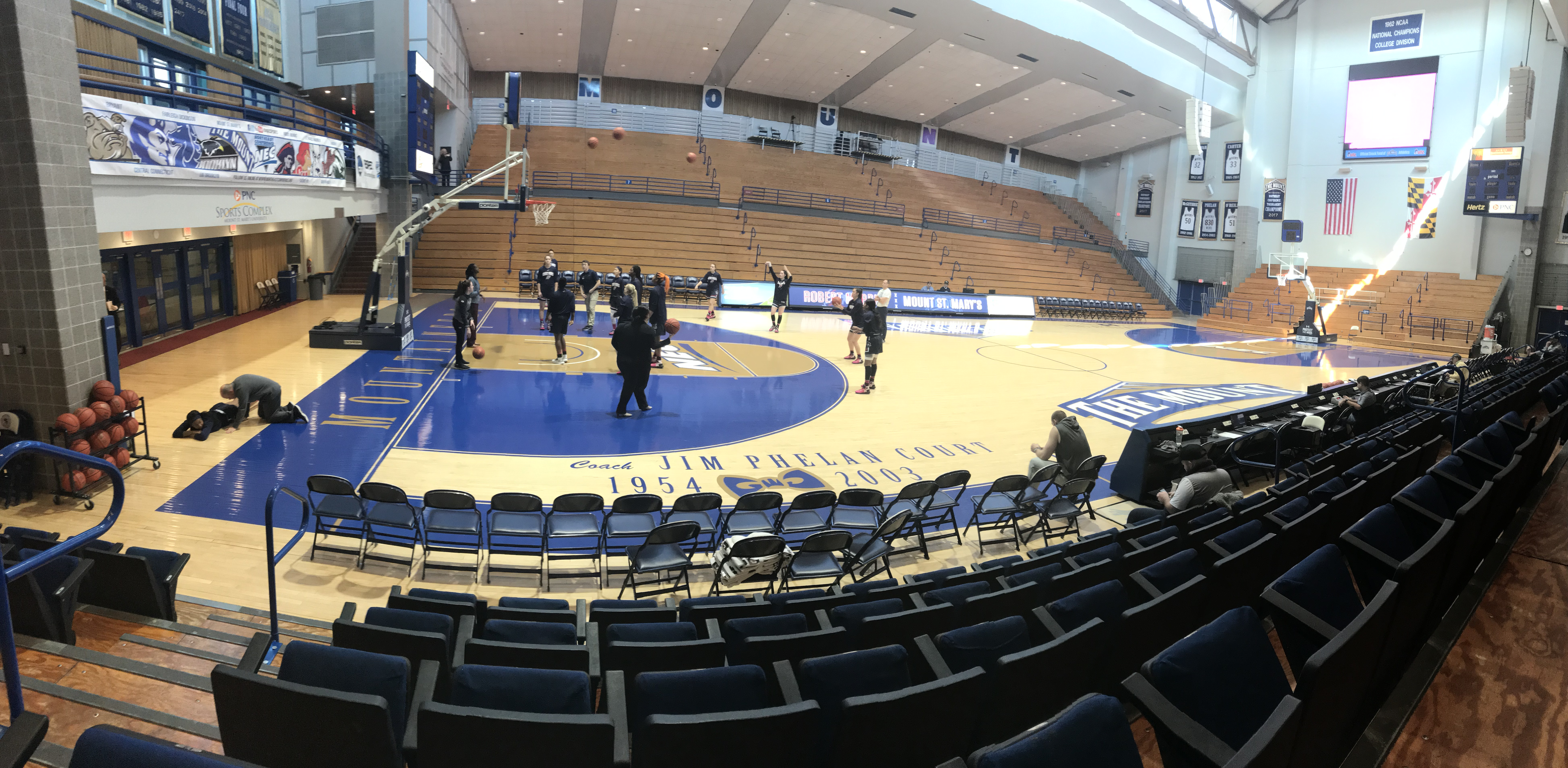

- Knott Arena (Maryland)
- Location: 16300 Old Emmitsburg Road; Emmitsburg, Maryland 21727
- Coordinates: 39.679492°N 77.346435°W
- Operator: Mount St. Mary's University
- Capacity: 4,000; 3,200 (Basketball)

Construction
- Opened: 1987

Tenants
- Mount St. Mary's Mountaineers men's basketball Mount St. Mary's Mountaineers women's basketball

Knott Arena is a multi-purpose sports arena at Mount St. Mary's University in Emmitsburg, Maryland. It opened in 1987 and is home to the Mount St. Mary's Mountaineers men's basketball and women's basketball teams. The arena has a seating capacity of approximately 3,200 for basketball and 4,000 for other events.

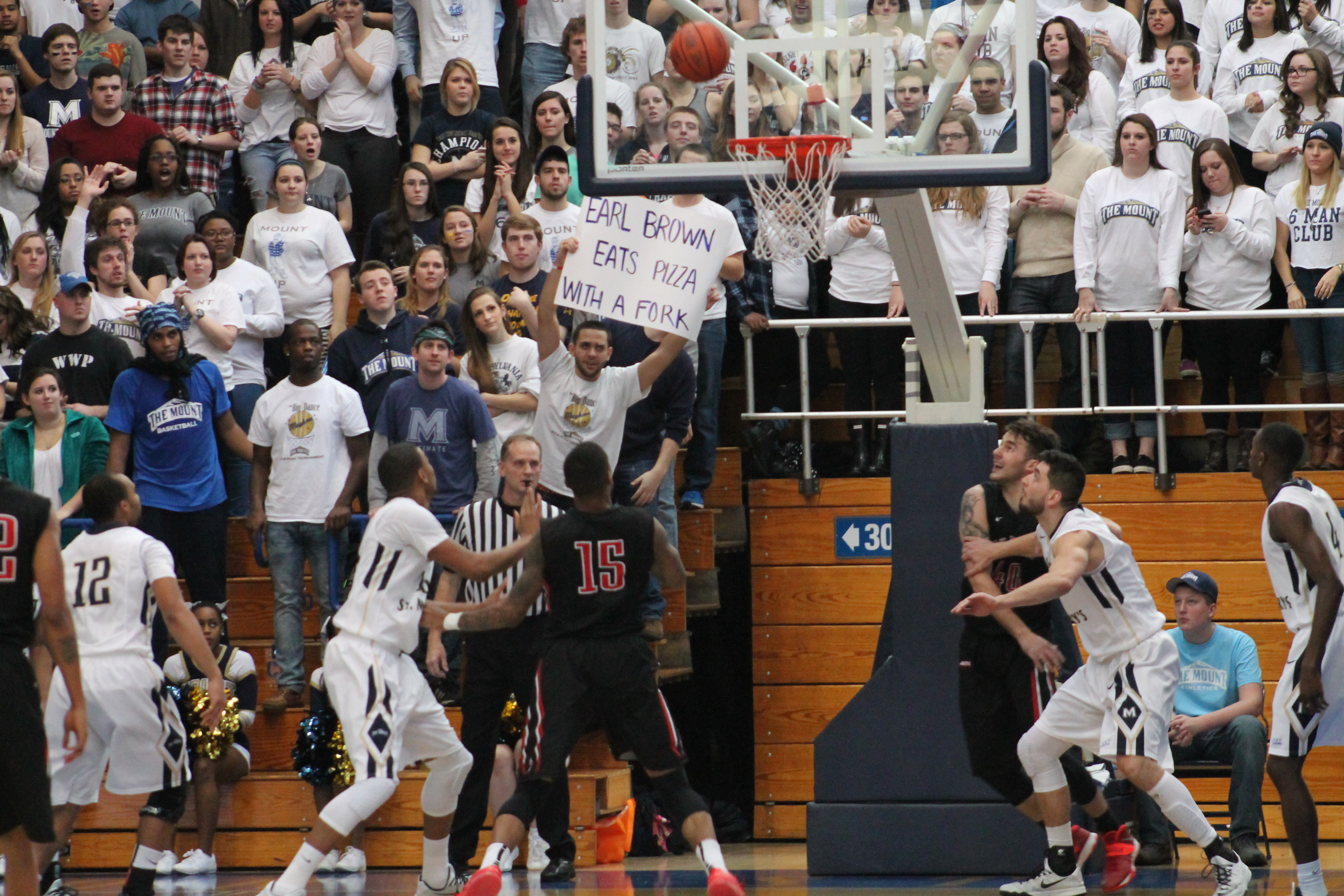
The Mount St. Mary's student section taunts St. Francis University player Earl Brown (15) during a game at the Knott Arena on January 24, 2015.

In 2006, the home court was named in honor of longtime men's basketball head coach Jim Phelan, who amassed a school-record 830 wins between 1954 and 2003.

The arena is part of the larger Knott Athletic Recreation Convocation Complex (ARCC), which serves as an athletic and recreation center. The complex encompasses the main arena, a concourse area, a field house, and an indoor pool. Adjacent to the ARCC are other outdoor facilities for Mount St. Mary's athletics, including tennis courts, a track, a synthetic turf field, and softball and baseball fields.

Frederick County Public Schools has used Knott Arena for high school graduation ceremonies.

On October 4, 2015, President Barack Obama spoke at the arena during the 34th National Fallen Firefighters Memorial Service.

In 2024, the concourse area underwent substantial renovations, removing a wall and installing new graphics, lighting, flooring, and painting. The new concourse was dedicated to former athletic director Lynne Phelan Robinson.

== See also ==
- List of NCAA Division I basketball arenas
