= 2014–15 Iona Gaels men's basketball team =

American college basketball season

2014–15 Iona Gaels men's basketball
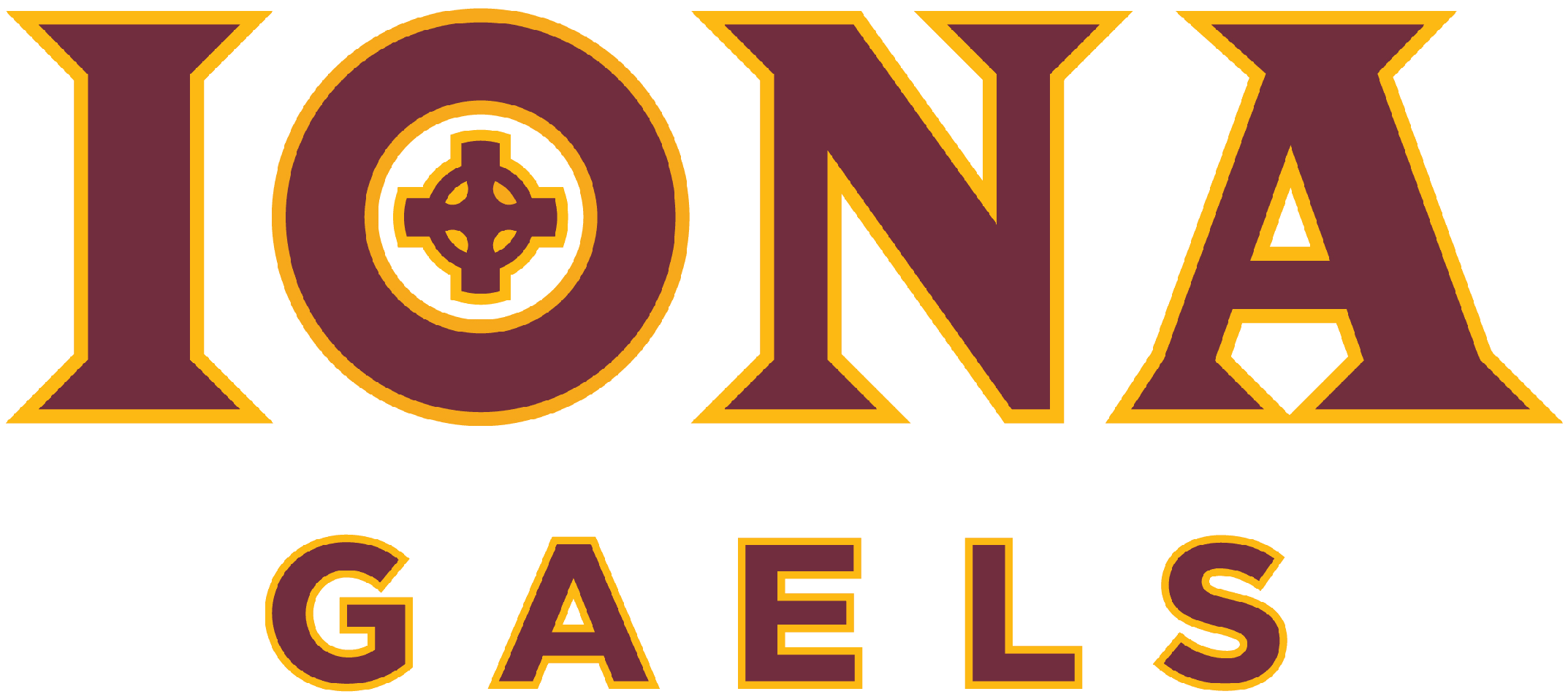

MAAC regular season champions

NIT, First round
- Conference: Metro Atlantic Athletic Conference
- Record: 26–9 (17–3 MAAC)
- Head coach: Tim Cluess (5th season)
- Assistant coaches: Jared Grasso; Brock Erickson; Douglas Leichner
- Home arena: Hynes Athletic Center

2014–15 MAAC men's basketball standings
	Conf.				Overall
Team	W		L	PCT	W		L	PCT
Iona	17	–	3	.850	26	–	9	.743
Rider	15	–	5	.750	21	–	12	.636
Manhattan †	13	–	7	.650	19	–	14	.576
Monmouth	13	–	7	.650	18	–	15	.545
Canisius	11	–	9	.550	18	–	15	.545
Quinnipiac	9	–	11	.450	15	–	15	.500
Saint Peter's	8	–	12	.400	16	–	18	.471
Siena	7	–	13	.350	11	–	20	.355
Niagara	7	–	13	.350	8	–	22	.267
Fairfield	5	–	15	.250	7	–	24	.226
Marist	5	–	15	.250	7	–	25	.219
† 2015 MAAC tournament winner

The 2014–15 Iona Gaels men's basketball team represented Iona College during the 2014–15 NCAA Division I men's basketball season. The Gaels, led by fifth year head coach Tim Cluess, played their home games at the Hynes Athletic Center and were members of the Metro Atlantic Athletic Conference. They finished the season 26–9, 17–3 in MAAC play to finish win the MAAC regular season championship. They defeated Siena and Monmouth to advance to the championship game of the MAAC tournament where they lost to Manhattan. As a regular season champion who failed to win their conference tournament, they received an automatic bid to the National Invitation Tournament where they lost in the first round to Rhode Island.

== Roster ==
2014–15 Iona Gaels men's basketball team
Players
Coaches

Pos.	#	Name	Height	Weight	Year	Previous school	Hometown
G	1	Isaiah Williams	6 ft 7 in (2.01 m)	190 lb (86 kg)	Jr	Malcolm X Shabazz; State College Florida Manatee	Newark, New Jersey
G	2	Kelvin Amayo	6 ft 4 in (1.93 m)	220 lb (100 kg)	Jr	NIA Prep; Marshall	Newark, New Jersey
G	3	Ibn Muhammad	5 ft 9 in (1.75 m)	155 lb (70 kg)	RS Jr	Bishop McNamara; Harcum College	Laurel, Maryland
G/F	4	Shackquiel Scott	6 ft 6 in (1.98 m)	215 lb (98 kg)	Fr	Passaic County Tech; Robinson School	Passaic, New Jersey
G	5	A. J. English	6 ft 4 in (1.93 m)	190 lb (86 kg)	Jr	Appoquinimink; St. Thomas More (CT)	Wilmington, Delaware
G	10	Vangelis Bebis	6 ft 6 in (1.98 m)	184 lb (83 kg)	Fr	Ikaros	Athens, Greece
F	11	Grant Ellis	6 ft 5 in (1.96 m)	200 lb (91 kg)	So	Hudson Catholic	Newark, New Jersey
F	13	David Laury	6 ft 9 in (2.06 m)	245 lb (111 kg)	Sr	NIA Prep; Lamar State–Port Arthur (TX)	East Orange, New Jersey
F	21	Jeylani Dublin	6 ft 6 in (1.98 m)	220 lb (100 kg)	Sr	Millbrook School; Longwood	Brooklyn, NY
G	22	Taylor Bessick	6 ft 9 in (2.06 m)	225 lb (102 kg)	Jr	Rise Academy; James Madison	Philadelphia, PA
F	32	Ryden Hines	6 ft 10 in (2.08 m)	225 lb (102 kg)	So	Dimond (Impact Academy)	Anchorage, Alaska
F	44	Daniel Robinson	7 ft 0 in (2.13 m)	220 lb (100 kg)	Fr	Atlantic Shores Christian; IMG Academy	Norfolk, Virginia

Head coach

- Tim Cluess (Hofstra)

Assistant coach(es)

- Jared Grasso (Quinnipiac)
- Brock Erickson (Assumption (MA))
- Douglas Leichner (Central Connecticut State)

Legend

- (C) Team captain
- (S) Suspended
- (I) Ineligible
- (W) Walk-on
- Injured
- Current redshirt

Roster
Last update: 2014-10-30

== Schedule ==
Date time, TV	Rank^{#}	Opponent^{#}	Result	Record	Site (attendance) city, state
Regular season
11/14/2014*; 7:00 pm		Cleveland State	W 78–73	1–0	Hynes Athletic Center (2,008); New Rochelle, NY
11/18/2014*; 7:00 am, ESPN2		at Wofford; ESPN College Tip-Off Marathon	L 73–86	1–1	Benjamin Johnson Arena (3,014); Spartanburg, SC
11/21/2014*; 8:30 pm, ESPN3		at Wake Forest; Roundball Showcase	W 85–81	2–1	LJVM Coliseum (6,809); Winston-Salem, NC
11/23/2014*; 5:30 pm		at North Texas; Roundball Showcase	W 78–58	3–1	The Super Pit (2,278); Denton, TX
11/26/2014*; 7:00 pm		Delaware State; Roundball Showcase	W 126–76	4–1	Hynes Athletic Center (1,414); New Rochelle, NY
11/30/2014*; 3:30 pm, SECN		at No. 25 Arkansas; Roundball Showcase	L 77–94	4–2	Bud Walton Arena (6,203); Fayetteville, AR
12/07/2014; 4:30 pm		at Monmouth	L 89–92	4–3 (0–1)	Multipurpose Activity Center (1,484); West Long Branch, NJ
12/10/2014; 7:00 pm		Rider	W 77–64	5–3 (1–1)	Hynes Athletic Center (1,608); New Rochelle, NY
12/13/2014*; 2:00 pm		Indiana State	W 91–84	6–3	Hynes Athletic Center (1,681); New Rochelle, NY
12/20/2014*; 7:00 pm, NBCSN		at George Mason	L 81–86	6–4	Patriot Center (3,016); Fairfax, VA
12/23/2014*; 2:00 pm		Florida Gulf Coast	W 86–67	7–4	Hynes Athletic Center (1,913); New Rochelle, NY
12/28/2014*; 1:00 pm		at Drexel	W 81–62	8–4	Daskalakis Athletic Center (1,101); Philadelphia, PA
12/30/2014*; 7:00 pm		at Massachusetts	L 82–87	8–5	Mullins Center (4,011); Amherst, MA
01/04/2015; 2:00 pm		at Siena	W 86–72	9–5 (2–1)	Times Union Center (5,898); Albany, NY
01/06/2015; 7:00 pm		Quinnipiac	W 81–73	10–5 (3–1)	Hynes Athletic Center (1,150); New Rochelle, NY
01/10/2015; 2:00 pm		Canisius	W 79–76	11–5 (4–1)	Hynes Athletic Center (1,651); New Rochelle, NY
01/13/2015; 7:00 pm		Fairfield	W 74–58	12–5 (5–1)	Hynes Athletic Center (1,033); New Rochelle, NY
01/16/2015; 7:00 pm		at Niagara	W 80–79	13–5 (6–1)	Gallagher Center (879); Lewiston, NY
01/18/2015; 2:00 pm		at Canisius	L 74–78	13–6 (6–2)	Koessler Athletic Center (1,524); Buffalo, NY
01/22/2015; 7:00 pm		at Rider	W 78–68	14–6 (7–2)	Alumni Gymnasium (1,422); Lawrenceville, NJ
01/25/2015; 4:30 pm		vs. Niagara	W 87–64	15–6 (8–2)	Madison Square Garden (19,812); New York City, NY
01/31/2015; 7:00 pm, ESPN3		Saint Peter's	W 68–61 ^{OT}	16–6 (9–2)	Hynes Athletic Center (1,942); New Rochelle, NY
02/06/2015; 7:00 pm, ESPNU		Siena	W 87–83	17–6 (10–2)	Hynes Athletic Center (1,811); New Rochelle, NY
02/08/2015; 2:00 pm		Marist	W 89–67	18–6 (11–2)	Hynes Athletic Center (2,016); New Rochelle, NY
02/10/2015; 8:00 pm, ESPN3		at Fairfield; Rescheduled from Feb 2 due to inclement weather	W 72–57	19–6 (12–2)	Webster Bank Arena (1,410); Fairfield, CT
02/13/2015; 10:00 pm, ESPNU		at Manhattan	W 70–67	20–6 (13–2)	Draddy Gymnasium (2,520); Bronx, NY
02/15/2015; 4:00 pm		at Quinnipiac	W 60–57	21–6 (14–2)	TD Bank Sports Center (2,544); Hamden, CT
02/20/2015; 9:00 pm, ESPNU		at Marist	W 72–68	22–6 (15–2)	McCann Field House (1,277); Poughkeepsie, NY
02/22/2015; 4:00 pm, ESPN3		Monmouth	W 69–68	23–6 (16–2)	Hynes Athletic Center (2,611); New Rochelle, NY
02/27/2015; 7:00 pm, ESPN2		Manhattan	W 79–75	24–6 (17–2)	Hynes Athletic Center (2,611); New Rochelle, NY
03/01/2015; 2:00 pm, ESPN3		at Saint Peter's	L 60–68	24–7 (17–3)	Yanitelli Center (518); Jersey City, NJ
MAAC tournament
03/07/2015; 12:00 pm, ESPN3		vs. Siena; Quarterfinals	W 74–71	25–7	Times Union Center (5,159); Albany, NY
03/08/2015; 4:30 pm, ESPN3		vs. Monmouth; Semifinals	W 95–77	26–7	Times Union Center (2,752); Albany, NY
03/09/2015; 9:00 pm, ESPN2		vs. Manhattan; Championship game	L 69–79	26–8	Times Union Center (2,963); Albany, NY
NIT
03/17/2015*; 7:00 pm, ESPNU	No. (6)	at (3) Rhode Island; First round	L 75–88	26–9	Ryan Center (2,638); Kingston, RI
*Non-conference game. ^{#}Rankings from AP Poll. (#) Tournament seedings in parentheses. All times are in Eastern Time. (#) during NIT is seed within region.
