= 2014–15 Rider Broncs men's basketball team =

American college basketball season

2014–15 Rider Broncs men's basketball
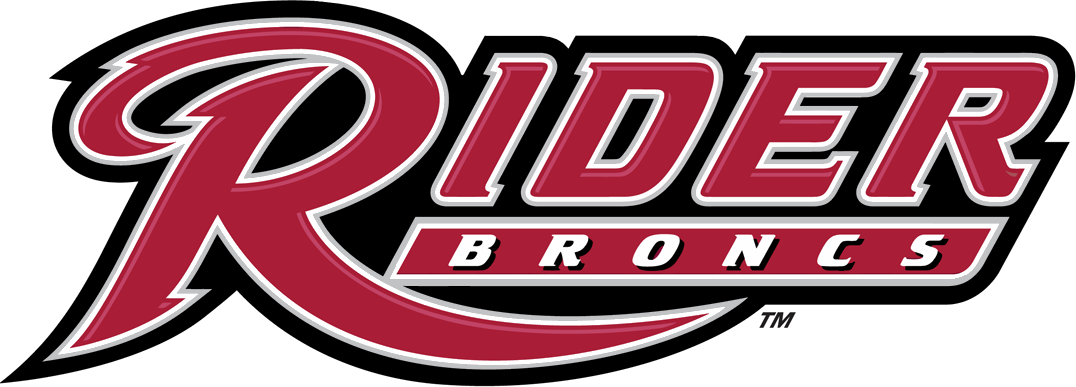

CBI, First round
- Conference: Metro Atlantic Athletic Conference
- Record: 21–12 (15–5 MAAC)
- Head coach: Kevin Baggett (3rd season)
- Assistant coaches: Mike Witcoskie; John Griffin; Donyell Marshall
- Home arena: Alumni Gymnasium

2014–15 MAAC men's basketball standings
	Conf.				Overall
Team	W		L	PCT	W		L	PCT
Iona	17	–	3	.850	26	–	9	.743
Rider	15	–	5	.750	21	–	12	.636
Manhattan †	13	–	7	.650	19	–	14	.576
Monmouth	13	–	7	.650	18	–	15	.545
Canisius	11	–	9	.550	18	–	15	.545
Quinnipiac	9	–	11	.450	15	–	15	.500
Saint Peter's	8	–	12	.400	16	–	18	.471
Siena	7	–	13	.350	11	–	20	.355
Niagara	7	–	13	.350	8	–	22	.267
Fairfield	5	–	15	.250	7	–	24	.226
Marist	5	–	15	.250	7	–	25	.219
† 2015 MAAC tournament winner

The 2014–15 Rider Broncs men's basketball team represented Rider University during the 2014–15 NCAA Division I men's basketball season. The Broncs, led by third year head coach Kevin Baggett, played their home games at Alumni Gymnasium and were members of the Metro Atlantic Athletic Conference. The team's top performers were seniors Teddy Okereafor and Matt Lopez. Walk-on senior Emerson Bursis served as team captain. The Broncs finished the season 21–12, 15–5 in MAAC play to finish in second place. They lost in the quarterfinals of the MAAC tournament to Saint Peter's. They were invited to the College Basketball Invitational where they lost in the first round to Loyola–Chicago.

== Roster ==
Number	Name	Position	Height	Weight	Year	Hometown
0	Kahilil Thomas	Forward	6–7	210	Sophomore	Parkway, Florida
2	Zedric Sadler	Guard	6–3	195	Junior	Detroit, Michigan
3	Jimmie Taylor	Guard	6–3	195	Sophomore	Suwannee, Florida
5	Teddy Okereafor	Guard	6–4	195	RS Senior	London, England
10	Anthony D'Orazio	Guard	6–2	185	RS Senior	Camden, New Jersey
11	Xavier Lundy	Forward	6–7	220	Sophomore	Paulsboro, New Jersey
12	Anthony Durham	Guard	6–3	195	Freshman	Philadelphia, Pennsylvania
14	Shawn Valentine	Forward	6–7	195	Junior	Sicklerville, New Jersey
15	Khalil Alford	Guard	6–5	210	Junior	Raleigh, North Carolina
20	Emerson Bursis	Forward	6–5	200	Senior	Scotrun, Pennsylvania
22	Josh Williams	Guard/Forward	6–6	180	Freshman	Trenton, New Jersey
25	Junior Fortunat	Forward/Center	6–9	235	Senior	Montreal, Quebec
32	Kenny Grant	Forward	6–9	240	Freshman	East Orange, New Jersey
35	Matt Lopez	Center	7–0	245	RS Senior	Erial, New Jersey

== Schedule ==
Date time, TV	Opponent	Result	Record	Site (attendance) city, state
Exhibition
11/02/2014*; 4:00 pm	Kutztown	W 62–51		Alumni Gymnasium (1,650); Lawrenceville, NJ
Regular season
11/14/2014*; 7:00 pm	at Princeton	L 58–64	0–1	Jadwin Gymnasium (1,939); Princeton, NJ
11/18/2014*; 7:00 pm	at Penn	W 73–57	1–1	Palestra (1,066); Philadelphia, PA
11/21/2014*; 7:00 pm	Lehigh	W 78–74	2–1	Alumni Gymnasium (1,650); Lawrenceville, NJ
11/24/2014*; 8:00 pm, ESPN3	at No. 11 Kansas; Orlando Classic opening round	L 60–87	2–2	Allen Fieldhouse (16,300); Lawrence, KS
11/27/2014*; 6:30 pm, ESPN2	vs. No. 20 Michigan State; Orlando Classic quarterfinals	L 45–77	2–3	HP Field House (3,216); Lake Buena Vista, FL
11/28/2014*; 6:30 pm, ESPNU	vs. Georgia Tech; Orlando Classic consolation round	L 54–61	2–4	HP Field House (3,449); Lake Buena Vista, FL
11/30/2014*; 10:30 am	vs. Santa Clara; Orlando Classic 7th place game	L 60–68	2–5	HP Field House (4,842); Lake Buena Vista, FL
12/03/2014*; 7:00 pm	Central Connecticut	W 69–56	3–5	Alumni Gymnasium (1,515); Lawrenceville, NJ
12/07/2014; 2:00 pm	Siena	W 80–68	4–5 (1–0)	Alumni Gymnasium (1,491); Lawrenceville, NJ
12/10/2014; 7:00 pm	at Iona	L 64–77	4–6 (1–1)	Hynes Athletic Center (1,608); New Rochelle, NY
12/13/2014*; 2:00 pm	at Hartford	W 63–61	5–6	Chase Arena at Reich Family Pavilion (1,444); Hartford, CT
12/18/2014*; 7:30 pm	Morgan State	W 62–48	6–6	Alumni Gymnasium (1,018); Lawrenceville, NJ
12/29/2014*; 7:00 pm	at Wagner	W 76–71	7–6	Spiro Sports Center (1,323); Staten Island, NY
01/02/2015; 7:00 pm	at Marist	W 69–59	8–6 (2–1)	McCann Field House (1,172); Poughkeepsie, NY
01/05/2015; 7:00 pm, ESPN3	at Fairfield	W 62–46	9–6 (3–1)	Webster Bank Arena (1,481); Fairfield, CT
01/10/2015; 2:00 pm	Saint Peter's	W 68–55	10–6 (4–1)	Alumni Gymnasium (1,010); Lawrenceville, NJ
01/12/2015; 2:00 pm	Monmouth	L 54–55	10–7 (4–2)	Alumni Gymnasium (1,215); Lawrenceville, NJ
01/15/2015; 8:00 pm, ESPN3	at Quinnipiac	W 56–53	11–7 (5–2)	TD Bank Sports Center (873); Hamden, CT
01/18/2015; 2:00 pm	at Manhattan	W 82–79 ^{OT}	12–7 (6–2)	Draddy Gymnasium (1,112); Bronx, NY
01/22/2015; 7:00 pm	Iona	L 68–78	12–8 (6–3)	Alumni Gymnasium (1,422); Lawrenceville, NJ
01/24/2015; 7:00 pm	Canisius	W 59–46	13–8 (7–3)	Alumni Gymnasium (1,650); Lawrenceville, NJ
01/29/2015; 8:00 pm, ESPN3	at Saint Peter's	W 58–49	14–8 (8–3)	Yanitelli Center (856); Jersey City, NY
02/02/2015; 7:00 pm	at Siena	L 72–79	14–9 (8–4)	Times Union Center (5,472); Albany, NY
02/05/2015; 8:00 pm, ESPN3	Fairfield	W 54–52 ^{OT}	15–9 (9–4)	Alumni Gymnasium (1,616); Lawrenceville, NJ
02/08/2015; 2:00 pm	Manhattan	W 85–77	16–9 (10–4)	Alumni Gymnasium (1,650); Lawrenceville, NJ
02/13/2015; 7:00 pm	at Canisius	W 60–59	17–9 (11–4)	Koessler Athletic Center (983); Buffalo, NY
02/15/2015; 2:00 pm	at Niagara	W 69–60	18–9 (12–4)	Gallagher Center (1,179); Lewiston, NY
02/19/2015; 7:00 pm	Quinnipiac	W 94–83	19–9 (13–4)	Alumni Gymnasium (1,650); Lawrenceville, NJ
02/21/2015; 2:00 pm	Niagara	L 61–65	19–10 (13–5)	Alumni Gymnasium (1,521); Lawrenceville, NJ
02/26/2015; 8:00 pm, ESPN3	at Monmouth	W 63–60	20–10 (14–5)	Multipurpose Activity Center (2,864); West Long Branch, NJ
03/01/2015; 2:00 pm, ESPN3	Marist	W 59–49	21–10 (15–5)	Alumni Gymnasium (1,650); Lawrenceville, NJ
MAAC tournament
03/07/2015; 5:30 pm, ESPN3	vs. Saint Peter's; Quarterfinals	L 59–68	21–11	Times Union Center (3,120); Albany, NY
College Basketball Invitational
03/17/2015*; 8:80 pm	at Loyola–Chicago; First round	L 59–62	21–12	Joseph J. Gentile Arena (1,105); Chicago, IL
*Non-conference game. ^{#}Rankings from AP Poll. (#) Tournament seedings in parentheses. All times are in Eastern Time.
