= 2014–15 Siena Saints men's basketball team =

American college basketball season

2014–15 Siena Saints men's basketball
- Conference: Metro Atlantic Athletic Conference
- Record: 11–20 (7–13 MAAC)
- Head coach: Jimmy Patsos (2nd season)
- Assistant coaches: Greg Manning; Luke D'Alessio; Lucious Jordan
- Home arena: Times Union Center; Alumni Recreation Center

2014–15 MAAC men's basketball standings
	Conf.				Overall
Team	W		L	PCT	W		L	PCT
Iona	17	–	3	.850	26	–	9	.743
Rider	15	–	5	.750	21	–	12	.636
Manhattan †	13	–	7	.650	19	–	14	.576
Monmouth	13	–	7	.650	18	–	15	.545
Canisius	11	–	9	.550	18	–	15	.545
Quinnipiac	9	–	11	.450	15	–	15	.500
Saint Peter's	8	–	12	.400	16	–	18	.471
Siena	7	–	13	.350	11	–	20	.355
Niagara	7	–	13	.350	8	–	22	.267
Fairfield	5	–	15	.250	7	–	24	.226
Marist	5	–	15	.250	7	–	25	.219
† 2015 MAAC tournament winner

The 2014–15 Siena Saints men's basketball team represented Siena College during the 2014–15 NCAA Division I men's basketball season. The Saints, led by second year head coach Jimmy Patsos, played their home games at the Times Union Center, with the exhibition game at Alumni Recreation Center, and were members of the Metro Atlantic Athletic Conference. They finished the season 11–20, 7–13 in MAAC play to finish in a tie for eighth place. They advanced to the quarterfinals of the MAAC tournament where they lost to Iona.

== Roster ==
2014–15 Siena Saints men's basketball team
Players
Coaches

Pos.	#	Name	Height	Weight	Year	Previous school	Hometown
F	0	Javion Ogunyemi	6 ft 8 in (2.03 m)	239 lb (108 kg)	So	Troy	Troy, New York
G	1	Marquis Wright	6 ft 0 in (1.83 m)	160 lb (73 kg)	So	North Point	Waldorf, Maryland
F	2	Willem Brandwijk	6 ft 8 in (2.03 m)	229 lb (104 kg)	Fr	Holderness School	Voorburg, Netherlands
G	3	Ryan Oliver	6 ft 5 in (1.96 m)	200 lb (91 kg)	Jr	Northfield Mount Hermon (MA)	Inglewood, California
G	5	Evan Hymes	5 ft 9 in (1.75 m)	148 lb (67 kg)	Sr	Kestrel Hts. Charter Academy	Durham, North Carolina
G	11	Patrick Cole	6 ft 5 in (1.96 m)	210 lb (95 kg)	So	Barringer	Newark, New Jersey
G	12	Mike Wilson	6 ft 0 in (1.83 m)	159 lb (72 kg)	So	Eastern	Voorhees, New Jersey
G	15	Cameron Gottfried	6 ft 3 in (1.91 m)	175 lb (79 kg)	Fr	Broughton	Raleigh, North Carolina
F	20	Jimmy Merrill	6 ft 10 in (2.08 m)	215 lb (98 kg)	So	Columbia	Rensselaer, New York
G	21	Jimmy Paige	6 ft 4 in (1.93 m)	211 lb (96 kg)	Fr	Cape Henry Collegiate	Bridgeport, Ohio
G	23	Maurice White	6 ft 4 in (1.93 m)	213 lb (97 kg)	So	St. Frances Academy	Baltimore, Maryland
G/F	24	Lavon Long	6 ft 7 in (2.01 m)	222 lb (101 kg)	So	Oakland Mills	Columbia, Maryland
F	31	Brett Bisping	6 ft 8 in (2.03 m)	238 lb (108 kg)	Jr	Morton	Peoria, Illinois
G	33	Rob Poole	6 ft 6 in (1.98 m)	191 lb (87 kg)	Sr	Paul VI	Cherry Hill, New Jersey
C	34	Imoh Silas	6 ft 9 in (2.06 m)	229 lb (104 kg)	Sr	Holderness School	Lagos, Nigeria

Head coach

- Jimmy Patsos, 2nd yr. (Catholic, 1989)

Assistant coach(es)

- Greg Manning, 2nd yr. (Loyola (MD), 2008)
- Luke D'Alessio, 2nd yr. (Catholic, 1983)
- Lucious Jordan, 2nd yr. (Albany, 2006)

Legend

- (C) Team captain
- (S) Suspended
- (I) Ineligible
- (W) Walk-on
- Injured
- Current redshirt

Roster
Last update: October 28, 2014

== Schedule ==
Date time, TV	Opponent	Result	Record	Site (attendance) city, state
Exhibition
11/08/2014*; 7:00 pm	Gannon	W 74–63		Alumni Recreation Center (1,773); Loudonville, NY
Regular season
11/14/2014*; 7:00 pm	at Massachusetts	L 87–95	0–1	Mullins Center (8,187); Amherst, MA
11/17/2014*; 7:00 pm, TWCSC	Vermont	L 76–84	0–2	Times Union Center (5,964); Albany, NY
11/19/2014*; 7:00 pm	at St. Bonaventure; Franciscan Cup	W 73–70	1–2	Reilly Center (3,291); Olean, NY
11/29/2014*; 7:00 pm	at Loyola (MD)	W 81–71	2–2	Reitz Arena (1,023); Baltimore, MD
12/01/2014*; 7:00 pm, SNY	at Fordham	L 67–69	2–3	Rose Hill Gymnasium (1,235); Bronx, NY
12/05/2014; 7:00 pm, TWCSC	Quinnipiac	W 88–67	3–3 (1–0)	Times Union Center (6,046); Albany, NY
12/07/2014; 2:00 pm	at Rider	L 68–80	3–4 (1–1)	Alumni Gymnasium (1,491); Lawrenceville, NJ
12/13/2014*; 7:45 pm, TWCSC	Albany; Albany Cup	L 68–77	3–5	Times Union Center (10,278); Albany, NY
12/19/2014*; 6:00 pm	at Radford	L 66–76	3–6	Dedmon Center (1,113); Radford, VA
12/23/2014*; 7:00 pm, TWCSC	Cornell	L 57–75	3–7	Times Union Center (5,973); Albany, NY
12/28/2014*; 2:00 pm, TWCSC	Bucknell	W 73–71	4–7	Times Union Center (6,113); Albany, NY
01/02/2015; 7:00 pm, SNY	at Fairfield	W 68–67	5–7 (2–1)	Webster Bank Arena (2,861); Fairfield, CT
01/04/2015; 2:00 pm, TWCSC	Iona	L 72–86	5–8 (2–2)	Times Union Center (5,898); Albany, NY
01/08/2015; 7:00 pm, TWCSC	Niagara	W 79–69	6–8 (3–2)	Times Union Center (5,646); Albany, NY
01/11/2015; 2:00 pm	Fairfield	L 67–79	6–9 (3–3)	Times Union Center (6,143); Albany, NY
01/16/2015; 7:00 pm	at Canisius	L 49–83	6–10 (3–4)	Koessler Athletic Center (1,407); Buffalo, NY
01/18/2015; 2:00 pm, TWCSC	at Niagara	W 74–70	7–10 (4–4)	Gallagher Center (800); Lewiston, NY
01/23/2015; 7:00 pm, ESPN3	Marist	W 69–60	8–10 (5–4)	Times Union Center (6,770); Albany, NY
01/25/2015; 2:00 pm	Saint Peter's	L 55–69	8–11 (5–5)	Times Union Center (6,244); Albany, NY
01/30/2015; 7:00 pm	at Manhattan	L 79–87	8–12 (5–6)	Draddy Gymnasium (2,018); Bronx, NY
02/02/2015; 7:00 pm, TWCSC	Rider	W 79–72	9–12 (6–6)	Times Union Center (5,472); Albany, NY
02/06/2015; 7:00 pm, ESPNU	at Iona	L 83–87	9–13 (6–7)	Hynes Athletic Center (1,811); New Rochelle, NY
02/09/2015; 7:00 pm	at Saint Peter's	L 57–65	9–14 (6–8)	Yanitelli Center (393); Jersey City, NJ
02/12/2015; 8:00 pm, ESPN3	at Marist	W 66–64	10–14 (7–8)	McCann Field House (1,226); Poughkeepsie, NY
02/14/2015; 7:00 pm	Monmouth	L 64–83	10–15 (7–9)	Times Union Center (6,260); Albany, NY
02/19/2015; 7:00 pm, TWCSC	Canisius	L 57–63 ^{OT}	10–16 (7–10)	Times Union Center (6,976); Albany, NY
02/21/2015; 7:00 pm, TWCSC	Manhattan	L 74–80	10–17 (7–11)	Times Union Center (6,809); Albany, NY
02/27/2015; 6:00 pm, ESPNU	at Quinnipiac	L 63–73	10–18 (7–12)	TD Bank Sports Center (2,732); Hamden, CT
03/01/2015; 4:30 pm, ESPN3	at Monmouth	L 57–63	10–19 (7–13)	Multipurpose Activity Center (2,037); West Long Branch, NJ
MAAC tournament
03/05/2015; 5:00 pm	vs. Niagara; First round	W 71–54	11–19	Times Union Center (4,062); Albany, NY
03/07/2015; 12:00 pm, ESPN3	vs. Iona; Quarterfinals	L 71–74	11–20	Times Union Center (5,159); Albany, NY
*Non-conference game. ^{#}Rankings from AP Poll. (#) Tournament seedings in parentheses. All times are in Eastern Time.
