= 2014–15 Fairfield Stags men's basketball team =

American college basketball season

2014–15 Fairfield Stags men's basketball
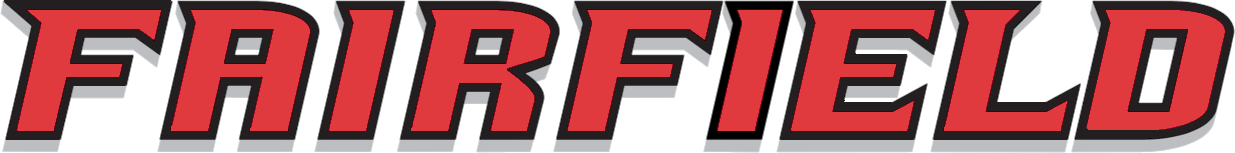
- Conference: Metro Atlantic Athletic Conference
- Record: 7–24 (5–15 MAAC)
- Head coach: Sydney Johnson (4th season)
- Assistant coaches: Tony Newsom; Tyson Wheeler; Martin Bahar
- Home arena: Webster Bank Arena

2014–15 MAAC men's basketball standings
	Conf.				Overall
Team	W		L	PCT	W		L	PCT
Iona	17	–	3	.850	26	–	9	.743
Rider	15	–	5	.750	21	–	12	.636
Manhattan †	13	–	7	.650	19	–	14	.576
Monmouth	13	–	7	.650	18	–	15	.545
Canisius	11	–	9	.550	18	–	15	.545
Quinnipiac	9	–	11	.450	15	–	15	.500
Saint Peter's	8	–	12	.400	16	–	18	.471
Siena	7	–	13	.350	11	–	20	.355
Niagara	7	–	13	.350	8	–	22	.267
Fairfield	5	–	15	.250	7	–	24	.226
Marist	5	–	15	.250	7	–	25	.219
† 2015 MAAC tournament winner

The 2014–15 Fairfield Stags men's basketball team represented Fairfield University during the 2014–15 NCAA Division I men's basketball season. The Stags, led by fourth year head coach Sydney Johnson, played their home games at Webster Bank Arena and were members of the Metro Atlantic Athletic Conference. They finished the season 7–24, 5–15 in MAAC play to finish in a tie for tenth place. They lost in the first round of the MAAC tournament to Saint Peter's.

== Roster ==
Number	Name	Position	Height	Weight	Year	Hometown
0	Mike Kirkland Jr.	Forward	6–7	215	Junior	Ocala, Florida
1	Jerome Segura	Guard	5–11	175	Freshman	Houston, Texas
3	Tyler Nelson	Guard	6–3	185	Freshman	Bradford, Massachusetts
5	DeMarcus Threatt	Guard	5–10	175	Junior	Alabaster, Alabama
14	Marcus Gilbert	Forward	6–6	185	Junior	Smyrna, Delaware
20	K.J. Rose	Guard	6–1	190	Sophomore	Binghamton, New York
21	Amadou Sidibe	Forward	6–8	215	Junior	The Bronx, New York
23	Steve Johnston	Guard	6–0	170	Senior	Stamford, Connecticut
24	Doug Chappell	Guard	6–2	175	Sophomore	Alexandria, Virginia
25	Steve Smith	Forward	6–9	190	Sophomore	Gwynedd Valley, Pennsylvania
30	Andrew Leone	Guard	5–6	160	Sophomore	New York City, New York
33	Matt Hill	Forward/Center	6–6	220	Sophomore	Glastonbury, Connecticut
35	Coleman Johnson	Forward	6–6	215	Junior	Oak Hill, Virginia
40	Kevin Degnan	Forward/Center	6–9	220	Freshman	Pearl River, New York
44	Malcolm Gilbert	Center	6–11	235	Senior	Smyrna, Delaware

== Schedule ==
Date time, TV	Opponent	Result	Record	Site (attendance) city, state
Exhibition
11/07/2014*; 7:00 pm	Bridgeport	W 74–67		Webster Bank Arena (1,315); Bridgeport, CT
Regular season
11/14/2014*; 3:00 pm	vs. Central Connecticut; Connecticut 6 Classic	W 71–63	1–0	TD Bank Sports Center (1,100); Hamden, CT
11/15/2014*; 8:00 pm, ESPN3	at No. 4 Duke; Coaches vs. Cancer Classic	L 59–109	1–1	Cameron Indoor Stadium (9,314); Durham, NC
11/21/2014*; 7:00 pm	Wofford; Coaches vs. Cancer Classic	L 36–54	1–2	Webster Bank Arena (1,733); Bridgeport, CT
11/22/2014*; 7:00 pm	Sam Houston State; Coaches vs. Cancer Classic	L 60–74	1–3	Webster Bank Arena (1,704); Bridgeport, CT
11/23/2014*; 2:00 pm	South Dakota; Coaches vs. Cancer Classic	W 80–72 ^{OT}	2–3	Webster Bank Arena (1,487); Bridgeport, CT
11/29/2014*; 3:00 pm	at Northeastern	L 48–57	2–4	Cabot Center (1,125); Boston, MA
12/01/2014*; 7:00 pm	Bucknell	L 66–72 ^{OT}	2–5	Webster Bank Arena (1,226); Bridgeport, CT
12/05/2014; 7:00 pm, ESPN3	Manhattan	W 67–54	3–5 (1–0)	Webster Bank Arena (1,947); Bridgeport, CT
12/07/2014; 1:00 pm	at Quinnipiac	W 56–52	4–5 (2–0)	TD Bank Sports Center (1,022); Hamden, CT
12/20/2014*; 1:30 pm	Belmont	L 61–73	4–6	Webster Bank Arena (1,571); Bridgeport, CT
12/22/2014; 7:00 pm	at Albany	L 66–77	4–7	SEFCU Arena (2,143); Albany, NY
12/28/2014*; 5:00 pm	vs. Loyola (MD); Brooklyn Hoops Winter Festival	L 59–61 ^{OT}	4–8	Barclays Center (6,032); Brooklyn, NY
01/02/2015; 7:00 pm	Siena	L 67–68	4–9 (2–1)	Webster Bank Arena (2,861); Bridgeport, CT
01/05/2015; 7:00 pm	Rider	L 46–62	4–10 (2–2)	Webster Bank Arena (1,481); Bridgeport, CT
01/11/2015; 2:00 pm	at Siena	W 79–67	5–10 (3–2)	Times Union Center (6,143); Albany, NY
01/13/2015; 7:00 pm	at Iona	L 58–74	5–11 (3–3)	Hynes Athletic Center (1,033); New Rochelle, NY
01/16/2015; 7:00 pm	Marist	W 60–54	6–11 (4–3)	Webster Bank Arena (2,305); Bridgeport, CT
01/18/2015; 4:30 pm	at Monmouth	L 70–77	6–12 (4–4)	Multipurpose Activity Center (654); West Long Branch, NJ
01/22/2015; 8:00 pm, ESPN3	Canisius	L 50–64	6–13 (4–5)	Webster Bank Arena (2,360); Bridgeport, CT
01/25/2015; 2:00 pm	at Marist	L 67–73	6–14 (4–6)	McCann Field House (1,452); Poughkeepsie, NY
01/30/2015; 7:00 pm, ESPNU	Monmouth	L 59–60	6–15 (4–7)	Webster Bank Arena (2,851); Bridgeport, CT
02/02/2015; 7:00 pm	Iona			Webster Bank Arena; Bridgeport, CT
02/05/2015; 8:00 pm, ESPN3	at Rider	L 52–54 ^{OT}	6–16 (4–8)	Alumni Gymnasium (1,616); Lawrenceville, NJ
02/07/2015; 2:00 pm	at Saint Peter's	L 58–69	6–17 (4–9)	Yanitelli Center (317); Jersey City, NJ
02/10/2015; 8:00 pm, ESPN3	Iona	L 57–72	6–18 (4–10)	Webster Bank Arena (1,410); Bridgeport, CT
02/13/2015; 8:00 pm, ESPN3	Quinnipiac	L 59–60	6–19 (4–11)	Webster Bank Arena (2,937); Bridgeport, CT
02/15/2015; 2:00 pm	at Manhattan	L 70–79	6–20 (4–12)	Draddy Gymnasium (1,317); Riverdale, NY
02/19/2015; 7:00 pm, ESPN3	Niagara	L 53–55	6–21 (4–13)	Webster Bank Arena (1,406); Bridgeport, CT
02/21/2015; 2:00 pm, ESPN3	Saint Peter's	W 57–43	7–21 (5–13)	Webster Bank Arena (2,867); Bridgeport, CT
02/27/2015; 7:00 pm	at Canisius	L 65–72	7–22 (5–14)	Koessler Athletic Center (1,332); Buffalo, NY
03/01/2015; 2:00 pm	at Niagara	L 56–57	7–23 (5–15)	Gallagher Center (1,326); Lewiston, NY
MAAC tournament
03/05/2013; 7:00 pm	vs. Saint Peter's; First round	L 33–63	7–24	Times Union Center (4,062); Albany, NY
*Non-conference game. ^{#}Rankings from AP Poll. (#) Tournament seedings in parentheses. All times are in Eastern Time.
