= 2014–15 Niagara Purple Eagles men's basketball team =

American college basketball season

2014–15 Niagara Purple Eagles men's basketball
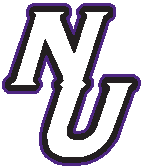
- Conference: Metro Atlantic Athletic Conference
- Record: 8–22 (7–13 MAAC)
- Head coach: Chris Casey (2nd season)
- Assistant coaches: Marc Rybczyk; Will Lanier; Kareem Brown
- Home arena: Gallagher Center

2014–15 MAAC men's basketball standings
	Conf.				Overall
Team	W		L	PCT	W		L	PCT
Iona	17	–	3	.850	26	–	9	.743
Rider	15	–	5	.750	21	–	12	.636
Manhattan †	13	–	7	.650	19	–	14	.576
Monmouth	13	–	7	.650	18	–	15	.545
Canisius	11	–	9	.550	18	–	15	.545
Quinnipiac	9	–	11	.450	15	–	15	.500
Saint Peter's	8	–	12	.400	16	–	18	.471
Siena	7	–	13	.350	11	–	20	.355
Niagara	7	–	13	.350	8	–	22	.267
Fairfield	5	–	15	.250	7	–	24	.226
Marist	5	–	15	.250	7	–	25	.219
† 2015 MAAC tournament winner

The 2014–15 Niagara Purple Eagles men's basketball team represented Niagara University during the 2014–15 NCAA Division I men's basketball season. The Purple Eagles, led by second-year head coach Chris Casey, played their home games at the Gallagher Center in Lewiston, New York and were members of the Metro Atlantic Athletic Conference (MAAC). They finished the season 8–22, 7–13 in MAAC play, to finish in a tie for eighth place. They lost in the first round of the MAAC tournament to Siena.

== Roster ==
Number	Name	Position	Height	Weight	Year	Hometown
1	Camerson Fowler	Guard	6' 0"	165	RS–Sophomore	Detroit, MI
2	Emile Blackman	Guard	6' 4"	195	RS–Sophomre	Dix Hills, NY
4	Rayvon Harris	Guard/forward	6' 5"	215	RS–Sophomore	Raleigh, NC
5	DarJar Dickson	Forward	6' 9"	205	Freshman	Washington, D.C.
10	Wesley Myers	Guard	6' 2"	180	Sophomore	Brooklyn, NY
11	Ramone Snowden	Forward	6' 5"	210	Sophomore	Virginia Beach, VA
12	Karonn Davis	Guard	6' 2"	185	RS–Freshman	Philadelphia, PA
13	Matt Scott	Forward	6' 4"	170	Freshman	Brooklyn, NY
14	James Suber	Forward	6' 6"	210	Freshman	Philadelphia, PA
15	Julian Richardson	Guard	6' 3"	180	Freshman	Woodland Hills, CA
21	Anders Skou Hansen	Guard	6' 3"	180	Freshman	Brøndby, Denmark
22	Dominique Reid	Forward	6' 8"	200	RS–Freshman	Erial, NJ
24	David Varoli	Guard	6' 0"	175	Sophomore	Katonah, NY
31	Thomas Fleming	Guard	6' 4"	195	RS–Sophomore	Dobbs Ferry, NY

== Schedule ==
Date time, TV	Opponent	Result	Record	Site (attendance) city, state
Exhibition
November 3, 2014*; 7:00 p.m.	Roberts Wesleyan	W 84–66		Gallagher Center (1,015); Lewiston, NY
Regular season
November 14, 2014*; 7:00 p.m., ESPN3	at Pittsburgh	L 45–78	0–1	Petersen Events Center (9,749); Pittsburgh, PA
November 20, 2014; 7:00 p.m.	at Saint Peter's	W 61–59	1–1 (1–0)	Yanitelli Center (N/A); Jersey City, NJ
November 22, 2014*; 7:00 p.m.	Hartford	L 62–65	1–2	Gallagher Center (1,417); Lewiston, NY
November 29, 2014*; 2:00 p.m.	vs. St. Bonaventure; Big 4 Basketball Classic	L 59–74	1–3	First Niagara Center (7,191); Buffalo, NY
December 2, 2014*; 7:00 p.m., FS1	at St. John's	L 57–70	1–4	Carnesecca Arena (4,475); Queens, NY
December 6, 2014; 3:00 p.m., ESPN3	Canisius; Battle of the Bridge	L 64–77	1–5 (1–1)	Gallagher Center (1,754); Lewiston, NY
December 13, 2014*; 7:00 p.m.	at Davidson	L 58–78	1–6	John M. Belk Arena (3,244); Davidson, NC
December 19, 2014*; 7:00 p.m., ESPN3	at Buffalo	L 62–88	1–7	Alumni Arena (2,702); Amherst, NY
December 23, 2014*; 7:00 p.m.	Arkansas State	L 69–74	1–8	Gallagher Center (909); Lewiston, NY
December 30, 2014*; 7:00 p.m.	Albany	W 65–47	2–8	Gallagher Center (1,071); Lewiston, NY
January 2, 2015; 7:00 p.m.	Manhattan	W 73–61	3–8 (2–1)	Gallagher Center (905); Lewiston, NY
January 4, 2015; 2:00 p.m.	Monmouth	L 50–66	3–9 (2–2)	Gallagher Center (981); Lewiston, NY
January 8, 2015; 7:00 p.m.	at Siena	L 69–79	3–10 (2–3)	Times Union Center (5,646); Albany, NY
January 10, 2015; 7:00 p.m.	at Manhattan	L 75–84	3–11 (2–4)	Draddy Gymnasium (1,312); Riverdale, NY
January 13, 2015*; 7:00 p.m.	Penn	L 56–67	3–12	Gallagher Center (846); Lewiston, NY
January 16, 2015; 7:00 p.m.	Iona	L 79–80	3–13 (2–5)	Gallagher Center (879); Lewiston, NY
January 18, 2015; 2:00 p.m.	Siena	L 70–74	3–14 (2–6)	Gallagher Center (800); Lewiston, NY
January 23, 2015; 7:00 p.m.	at Monmouth	L 58–69	3–15 (2–7)	Multipurpose Activity Center (2,281); West Long Branch, NJ
January 25, 2015; 4:30 p.m.	vs. Iona	L 64–87	3–16 (2–8)	Madison Square Garden (19,812); New York City, NY
January 30, 2015; 7:00 p.m., ESPN3	Marist	L 61–65	3–17 (2–9)	Gallagher Center (1,201); Lewiston, NY
February 1, 2015; 2:00 p.m.	Quinnipiac	W 105–100 ^{2OT}	4–17 (3–9)	Gallagher Center (884); Lewiston, NY
February 6, 2015; 7:00 p.m.	at Marist	L 61–63	4–18 (3–10)	McCann Field House (1,547); Poughkeepsie, NY
February 8, 2015; 1:00 p.m.	at Quinnipiac	L 69–91	4–19 (3–11)	TD Bank Sports Center (1,688); Hamden, CT
February 13, 2015; 7:00 p.m.	Saint Peter's	L 65–77	4–20 (3–12)	Gallagher Center (1,184); Lewiston, NY
February 15, 2015; 2:00 p.m.	Rider	L 60–69	4–21 (3–13)	Gallagher Center (1,179); Lewiston, NY
February 19, 2015; 7:00 p.m., ESPN3	at Fairfield	W 55–53	5–21 (4–13)	Webster Bank Arena (1,406); Bridgeport, CT
February 21, 2015; 2:00 p.m.	at Rider	W 65–61	6–21 (5–13)	Alumni Gymnasium (1,521); Lawrenceville, NJ
February 24, 2015; 8:00 p.m., ESPN3	at Canisius; Battle of the Bridge	W 82–71	7–21 (6–13)	Koessler Athletic Center (2,196); Buffalo, NY
March 1, 2015; 2:00 p.m.	Fairfield	W 57–56	8–21 (7–13)	Gallagher Center (1,326); Lewiston, NY
MAAC tournament
March 5, 2013; 5:00 p.m.	at Siena; First round	L 54–71	8–22	Times Union Center (4,062); Albany, NY
*Non-conference game. ^{#}Rankings from AP poll. (#) Tournament seedings in parentheses. All times are in Eastern.
