= 2014–15 Quinnipiac Bobcats men's basketball team =

American college basketball season

2014–15 Quinnipiac Bobcats men's basketball
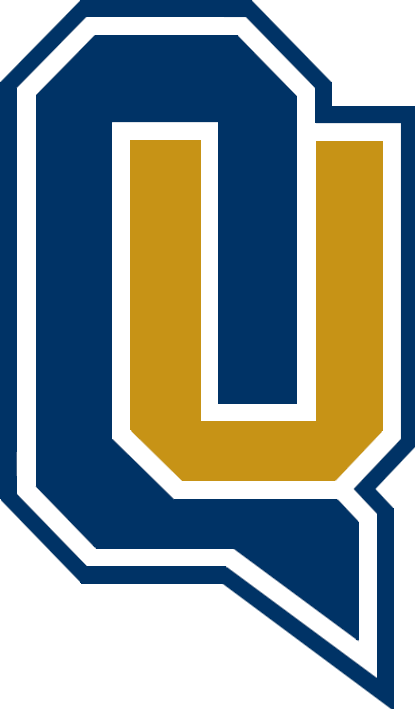
- Conference: Metro Atlantic Athletic Conference
- Record: 15–15 (9–11 MAAC)
- Head coach: Tom Moore (8th season)
- Assistant coaches: Sean Doherty; Eric Eaton; Scott Burrell
- Home arena: TD Bank Sports Center

2014–15 MAAC men's basketball standings
| | Conf. | | | | Overall |
| Team | W | | L | PCT | W | | L | PCT |
|---|---|---|---|---|---|---|---|---|
| Iona | 17 | – | 3 | .850 | 26 | – | 9 | .743 |
| Rider | 15 | – | 5 | .750 | 21 | – | 12 | .636 |
| Manhattan † | 13 | – | 7 | .650 | 19 | – | 14 | .576 |
| Monmouth | 13 | – | 7 | .650 | 18 | – | 15 | .545 |
| Canisius | 11 | – | 9 | .550 | 18 | – | 15 | .545 |
| Quinnipiac | 9 | – | 11 | .450 | 15 | – | 15 | .500 |
| Saint Peter's | 8 | – | 12 | .400 | 16 | – | 18 | .471 |
| Siena | 7 | – | 13 | .350 | 11 | – | 20 | .355 |
| Niagara | 7 | – | 13 | .350 | 8 | – | 22 | .267 |
| Fairfield | 5 | – | 15 | .250 | 7 | – | 24 | .226 |
| Marist | 5 | – | 15 | .250 | 7 | – | 25 | .219 |
† 2015 MAAC tournament winner

The 2014–15 Quinnipiac Bobcats men's basketball team represented Quinnipiac University during the 2014–15 NCAA Division I men's basketball season. The Bobcats, led by eighth year head coach Tom Moore, played their home games at the TD Bank Sports Center and were members of the Metro Atlantic Athletic Conference. They finished the season 15–15, 9–11 in MAAC play to finish in sixth place. They lost in the first round of the MAAC tournament to Marist.

== Roster ==
2014–15 Quinnipiac Bobcats men's basketball team
Players
Coaches

| Pos. | # | Name | Height | Weight | Year | Previous school | Hometown |
|---|---|---|---|---|---|---|---|
| G | 0 | Emanuel Binyam | 6 ft 1 in (1.85 m) | 175 lb (79 kg) | Sr | Mountain Mission | Rockville, Maryland |
| G | 1 | Zaid Hearst | 6 ft 4 in (1.93 m) | 215 lb (98 kg) | Sr | Salisbury (CT) School | Bethesda, Maryland |
| G | 2 | Kasim Chandler | 5 ft 10 in (1.78 m) | 160 lb (73 kg) | So | Imani Christian Academy/Eastside | Newark, New Jersey |
| G | 3 | George Dimitri Floras | 6 ft 1 in (1.85 m) | 180 lb (82 kg) | Fr | Merrimack/MacDuffie School | Nashua, New Hampshire |
| G | 4 | Gio McLean | 6 ft 1 in (1.85 m) | 205 lb (93 kg) | Jr | Bronx Regional/Westchester CC | Bronx, NY |
| G | 5 | Ayron Hutton | 6 ft 3 in (1.91 m) | 180 lb (82 kg) | Fr | Cape Henry | Virginia Beach, Virginia |
| F | 10 | Alain Chigha | 6 ft 8 in (2.03 m) | 207 lb (94 kg) | So | Rock School | Gainesville, Florida |
| F | 11 | A.J. Sumbry | 6 ft 8 in (2.03 m) | 227 lb (103 kg) | So | St. Benedict's Prep | East Windsor, New Jersey |
| F | 13 | Chaise Daniels | 6 ft 8 in (2.03 m) | 220 lb (100 kg) | Fr | Hillhouse/Putnam Science | Meriden, Connecticut |
| F | 15 | Samuel Dingba | 6 ft 5 in (1.96 m) | 200 lb (91 kg) | Fr | Salisbury School | Yaoundé, Cameroon |
| G | 15 | Samir Kalil | 6 ft 0 in (1.83 m) | 180 lb (82 kg) | Jr | Archbishop Stepinac | Mount Vernon, New York |
| G | 21 | Evan Conti | 6 ft 3 in (1.91 m) | 208 lb (94 kg) | Sr | Holy Cross | Bayside, New York |
| F | 22 | Justin Harris | 6 ft 8 in (2.03 m) | 254 lb (115 kg) | Sr | Paramus Catholic | Paterson, New Jersey |
| F | 23 | Ousmane Drame | 6 ft 9 in (2.06 m) | 225 lb (102 kg) | Sr | New Mission/Marianapolis Prep | Boston, Massachusetts |
| G | 25 | T'ziah Wood-Smith | 6 ft 4 in (1.93 m) | 190 lb (86 kg) | Sr | Baldwin (NY) | Baldwin, New York |
| G | 30 | James Ford, Jr. | 6 ft 4 in (1.93 m) | 203 lb (92 kg) | Jr | Quality Education Academy | Hopewell, Virginia |
| G | 33 | Greg Tarca | 6 ft 3 in (1.91 m) | 180 lb (82 kg) | Fr | Montgomery | Skillman, New Jersey |

Head coach

- Tom Moore (Boston University, 8th yr., 1987)

Assistant coach(es)

- Sean Doherty (Worcester State, 19th yr., 1992)
- Eric Eaton (UMass Dartmouth, 15th yr., 1997)
- Scott Burrell (Connecticut, 8th yr., 2010)

Legend

- (C) Team captain
- (S) Suspended
- (I) Ineligible
- (W) Walk-on
- Injured
- Current redshirt

Roster
Last update: 2014-10-31

== Schedule ==
| Date time, TV | Opponent | Result | Record | Site (attendance) city, state |
Regular season
| 11/14/2014*; 7:00 pm | Yale; Connecticut 6 Classic | W 89–85 ^{2OT} | 1–0 | TD Bank Sports Center (3,300); Hamden, CT |
| 11/18/2014*; 7:00 pm | La Salle | L 58–60 | 1–1 | TD Bank Sports Center (1,362); Hamden, CT |
| 11/22/2014*; 7:00 pm | at Albany | W 76–73 ^{OT} | 2–1 | SEFCU Arena (3,654); Albany, NY |
| 11/25/2014*; 7:00 pm | Hartford | L 50–54 | 2–2 | TD Bank Sports Center (838); Hamden, CT |
| 11/30/2014*; 7:00 pm | Vermont | W 89–73 | 3–2 | TD Bank Sports Center (1,013); Hamden, CT |
| 12/05/2014; 7:00 pm | at Siena | L 67–88 | 3–3 (0–1) | Times Union Center (6,046); Albany, NY |
| 12/07/2014; 1:00 pm | Fairfield | L 52–56 | 3–4 (0–2) | TD Bank Sports Center (1,022); Hamden, CT |
| 12/14/2014*; 1:00 pm | at Boston University | L 68–71 | 3–5 | Case Gym (394); Boston, MA |
| 12/18/2014*; 7:00 pm | Lehigh | W 80–65 | 4–5 | TD Bank Sports Center (913); Hamden, CT |
| 12/21/2014*; 1:00 pm | Oregon State | W 60–52 | 5–5 | TD Bank Sports Center (1,313); Hamden, CT |
| 12/29/2014*; 7:00 pm | Maine | W 81–64 | 6–5 | TD Bank Sports Center (1,402); Hamden, CT |
| 01/02/2015; 4:00 pm | Saint Peter's | L 60–66 | 6–6 (0–3) | TD Bank Sports Center (1,385); Hamden, CT |
| 01/06/2015; 7:00 pm | at Iona | L 73–81 | 6–7 (0–4) | Hynes Athletic Center (1,150); New Rochelle, NY |
| 01/09/2015; 7:00 pm | at Monmouth | W 68–64 | 7–7 (1–4) | Multipurpose Activity Center (1,512); West Long Branch, NJ |
| 01/11/2015; 1:00 pm | Marist | W 66–54 | 8–7 (2–4) | TD Bank Sports Center (1,093); Hamden, CT |
| 01/15/2015; 8:00 pm, ESPN3 | Rider | L 53–56 | 8–8 (2–5) | TD Bank Sports Center (873); Hamden, CT |
| 01/18/2015; 3:00 pm | at Marist | W 72–71 | 9–8 (3–5) | McCann Field House (1,121); Poughkeepsie, NY |
| 01/21/2015; 7:00 pm | at Saint Peter's | W 63–55 | 10–8 (4–5) | Yanitelli Center (418); Jersey City, NJ |
| 01/23/2015; 7:00 pm | Manhattan | W 73–59 | 11–8 (5–5) | TD Bank Sports Center (3,038); Hamden, CT |
| 01/30/2015; 7:00 pm | at Canisius | L 57–63 | 11–9 (5–6) | Koessler Athletic Center (1,403); Buffalo, NY |
| 02/01/2015; 2:00 pm | at Niagara | L 100–105 ^{2OT} | 11–10 (5–7) | Gallagher Center (884); Lewiston, NY |
| 02/05/2015; 7:00 pm | Monmouth | W 72–52 | 12–10 (6–7) | TD Bank Sports Center (1,088); Hamden, CT |
| 02/08/2015; 1:00 pm | Niagara | W 91–69 | 13–10 (7–7) | TD Bank Sports Center (1,688); Hamden, CT |
| 02/13/2015; 8:00 pm, ESPN3 | at Fairfield | W 60–59 | 14–10 (8–7) | Webster Bank Arena (2,937); Fairfield, CT |
| 02/15/2015; 4:00 pm | Iona | L 57–60 | 14–11 (8–8) | TD Bank Sports Center (2,544); Hamden, CT |
| 02/19/2015; 7:00 pm | at Rider | L 83–94 | 14–12 (8–9) | Alumni Gymnasium (1,650); Lawrenceville, NJ |
| 02/21/2015; 1:00 pm | Canisius | L 63–65 | 14–13 (8–10) | TD Bank Sports Center (2,170); Hamden, CT |
| 02/27/2015; 6:00 pm, ESPNU | Siena | W 73–63 | 15–13 (9–10) | TD Bank Sports Center (2,732); Hamden, CT |
| 03/01/2015; 2:00 pm, ESPN3 | at Manhattan | L 65–69 | 15–14 (9–11) | Draddy Gymnasium (1,819); Riverdale, NY |
MAAC tournament
| 03/05/2014; 9:00 pm | vs. Marist; First round | L 74–80 | 15–15 | Times Union Center (4,062); Albany, NY |
*Non-conference game. ^{#}Rankings from AP Poll. (#) Tournament seedings in parentheses. All times are in Eastern Time.
