= 2014–15 Saint Peter's Peacocks men's basketball team =

American college basketball season

2014–15 Saint Peter's Peacocks men's basketball
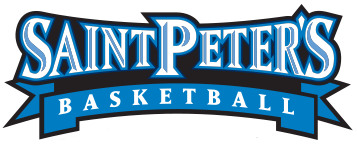
- Conference: Metro Atlantic Athletic Conference
- Record: 16–18 (8–12 MAAC)
- Head coach: John Dunne (9th season)
- Assistant coaches: Marlon Guild; Matt Henry; Serge Clement
- Home arena: Yanitelli Center

2014–15 MAAC men's basketball standings
	Conf.				Overall
Team	W		L	PCT	W		L	PCT
Iona	17	–	3	.850	26	–	9	.743
Rider	15	–	5	.750	21	–	12	.636
Manhattan †	13	–	7	.650	19	–	14	.576
Monmouth	13	–	7	.650	18	–	15	.545
Canisius	11	–	9	.550	18	–	15	.545
Quinnipiac	9	–	11	.450	15	–	15	.500
Saint Peter's	8	–	12	.400	16	–	18	.471
Siena	7	–	13	.350	11	–	20	.355
Niagara	7	–	13	.350	8	–	22	.267
Fairfield	5	–	15	.250	7	–	24	.226
Marist	5	–	15	.250	7	–	25	.219
† 2015 MAAC tournament winner

The 2014–15 Saint Peter's Peacocks men's basketball team represented Saint Peter's University during the 2014–15 NCAA Division I men's basketball season. The Peacocks, led by ninth year head coach John Dunne, played their home games at the Yanitelli Center and were members of the Metro Atlantic Athletic Conference. They finished the season 16–18, 8–12 in MAAC play to finish in seventh place. They advanced to the semifinals of the MAAC tournament where they lost to Manhattan.

== Roster ==
Number	Name	Position	Height	Weight	Year	Hometown
0	Simeon Dennis	Guard/Forward	6–3	185	Junior	Atlanta, Georgia
1	Mohamed Farih	Forward	6–4	200	Senior	Kearny, New Jersey
3	Trevis Wyche	Guard	6–1	175	Sophomore	Neptune, New Jersey
4	Jamel Fields	Guard	6–2	185	RS–Senior	Albany, New York
5	Travis Hester	Guard	6–4	200	Sophomore	Crozet, Virginia
10	Elias Desport	Forward	6–8	230	Junior	Stockholm, Sweden
11	Desi Washington	Guard	6–2	183	RS–Senior	Harrisburg, Pennsylvania
13	Tyler Gaskins	Forward	6–4	205	Senior	Roswell, Georgia
20	Chazz Patterson	Guard	6–3	170	RS–Sophomore	Browns Mills, New Jersey
21	Marvin Dominique	Forward	6–7	215	RS–Senior	Miramar, Florida
22	Elisha Boone	Guard	6–3	181	Freshman	Laurelton, New York
25	Kris Rolle	Forward	6–5	215	Senior	Miami, Florida
33	Rodney Hawkins	Forward	6–7	190	Freshman	Baltimore, Maryland
35	Quadir Welton	Forward/Center	6–8	230	Sophomore	Philadelphia, Pennsylvania

== Schedule ==
Date time, TV	Opponent	Result	Record	Site (attendance) city, state
Regular season
11/14/2014*; 8:00 pm	at Brown	L 58–70	0–1	Pizzitola Sports Center (1,128); Providence, RI
11/16/2014*; 2:00 pm	at Hartford	L 50–51	0–2	Chase Arena at Reich Family Pavilion (1,876); Hartford, CT
11/20/2014; 2:00 pm	Niagara	L 59–61	0–3 (0–1)	Yanitelli Center (N/A); Jersey City, NJ
11/22/2014*; 12:30 pm	at La Salle; Barclays Classic	L 50–59	0–4	Tom Gola Arena (1,607); Philadelphia, PA
11/25/2014*; 7:00 pm, BTN	at Rutgers; Barclays Classic	W 68–50	1–4	The RAC (3,913); Piscataway, NJ
11/28/2014*; 7:30 pm	Tennessee State; Barclays Classic	W 66–58	2–4	Yanitelli Center (N/A); Jersey City, NJ
11/29/2014*; 7:30 pm	Norfolk State; Barclays Classic	L 58–60	2–5	Yanitelli Center (321); Jersey City, NJ
12/03/2014; 7:00 pm	Canisius	L 57–60	2–6 (0–2)	Yanitelli Center (518); Jersey City, NJ
12/06/2014*; 2:00 pm	at Boston University	W 70–59	3–6	Case Gym (361); Boston, MA
12/10/2014*; 7:00 pm	Princeton	W 60–46	4–6	Yanitelli Center (518); Jersey City, NJ
12/14/2014*; 12:00 pm, FS1	at Seton Hall	L 52–67	4–7	Prudential Center (6,502); Newark, NJ
12/23/2014*; 4:00 pm	Fairleigh Dickinson	W 69–60	5–7	Yanitelli Center (221); Jersey City, NJ
12/28/2014*; 4:00 pm	at Cornell	W 59–52 ^{OT}	6–7	Newman Arena (847); Ithaca, NY
01/02/2015; 4:00 pm	at Quinnipiac	W 66–60	7–7 (1–2)	TD Bank Sports Center (1,385); Hamden, CT
01/04/2015; 4:00 pm	Marist	W 79–67	8–7 (2–2)	Yanitelli Center (223); Jersey City, NJ
01/07/2015; 7:00 pm	at Manhattan	L 63–68	8–8 (2–3)	Draddy Gymnasium (1,150); Riverdale, NY
01/10/2015; 2:00 pm	at Rider	L 55–68	8–9 (2–4)	Alumni Gymnasium (1,010); Lawrenceville, NJ
01/14/2015; 7:00 pm	at Monmouth	W 62–61	9–9 (3–4)	Multipurpose Activity Center (1,275); West Long Branch, NJ
01/16/2015; 7:00 pm	Manhattan	L 65–72 ^{OT}	9–10 (3–5)	Yanitelli Center (518); Jersey City, NJ
01/21/2015; 7:00 pm	Quinnipiac	L 55–63	9–11 (3–6)	Yanitelli Center (418); Jersey City, NJ
01/25/2015; 2:00 pm	at Siena	W 69–55	10–11 (4–6)	Times Union Center (6,244); Albany, NY
01/29/2015; 8:30 pm, ESPN3	Rider	L 49–58	10–12 (4–7)	Yanitelli Center (856); Jersey City, NJ
01/31/2015; 7:00 pm, ESPN3	at Iona	L 61–68 ^{OT}	10–13 (4–8)	Hynes Athletic Center (1,942); New Rochelle, NY
02/07/2015; 2:00 pm	Fairfield	W 69–58	11–13 (5–8)	Yanitelli Center (317); Jersey City, NJ
02/09/2015; 7:00 pm	Siena	W 65–57	12–13 (6–8)	Yanitelli Center (393); Jersey City, NJ
02/13/2015; 7:00 pm	at Niagara	W 77–65	13–13 (7–8)	Gallagher Center (1,184); Lewiston, NY
02/15/2015; 2:00 pm	at Canisius	L 55–69	13–14 (7–9)	Koessler Athletic Center (1,126); Buffalo, NY
02/19/2015; 7:00 pm, ESPN3	Monmouth	L 58–63	13–15 (7–10)	Yanitelli Center (514); Jersey City, NJ
02/21/2015; 2:00 pm, ESPN3	at Fairfield	L 43–57	13–16 (7–11)	Webster Bank Arena (2,867); Fairfield, CT
02/27/2015; 7:00 pm	at Marist	L 67–69	13–17 (7–12)	McCann Field House (N/A); Poughkeepsie, NY
03/01/2015; 2:00 pm	Iona	W 68–60	14–17 (8–12)	Yanitelli Center (518); Jersey City, NJ
MAAC tournament
03/05/2014; 7:00 pm	vs. Fairfield; First round	W 63–33	15–17	Times Union Center (4,062); Albany, NY
03/07/2014; 5:30 pm, ESPN3	vs. Rider; Quarterfinals	W 68–59	16–17	Times Union Center (N/A); Albany, NY
03/08/2014; 7:00 pm, ESPN3	vs. Manhattan; Semifinals	L 48–65	16–18	Times Union Center (2,752); Albany, NY
*Non-conference game. ^{#}Rankings from AP Poll. (#) Tournament seedings in parentheses. All times are in Eastern Time.
