= 2014–15 Monmouth Hawks men's basketball team =

American college basketball season

2014–15 Monmouth Hawks men's basketball
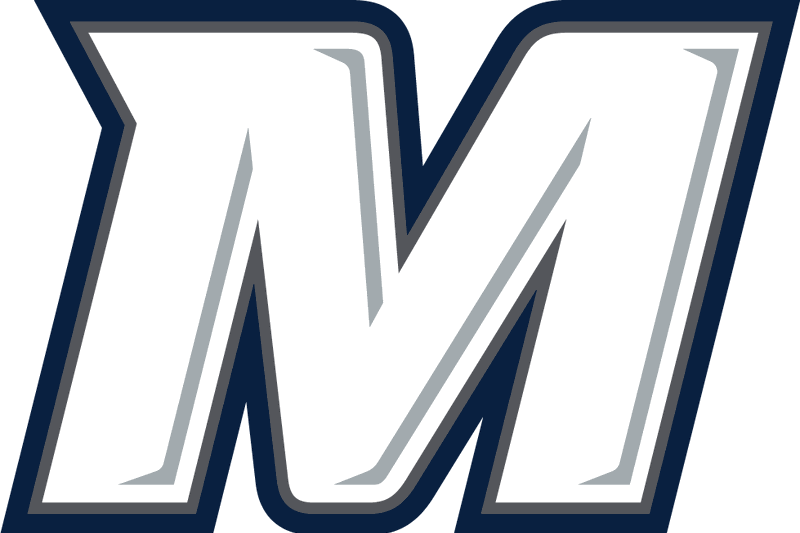
- Conference: Metro Atlantic Athletic Conference
- Record: 18–15 (13–7 MAAC)
- Head coach: King Rice (4th season)
- Assistant coaches: Rick Callahan; Brian Reese; Sam Ferry
- Home arena: Multipurpose Activity Center

2014–15 MAAC men's basketball standings
	Conf.				Overall
Team	W		L	PCT	W		L	PCT
Iona	17	–	3	.850	26	–	9	.743
Rider	15	–	5	.750	21	–	12	.636
Manhattan †	13	–	7	.650	19	–	14	.576
Monmouth	13	–	7	.650	18	–	15	.545
Canisius	11	–	9	.550	18	–	15	.545
Quinnipiac	9	–	11	.450	15	–	15	.500
Saint Peter's	8	–	12	.400	16	–	18	.471
Siena	7	–	13	.350	11	–	20	.355
Niagara	7	–	13	.350	8	–	22	.267
Fairfield	5	–	15	.250	7	–	24	.226
Marist	5	–	15	.250	7	–	25	.219
† 2015 MAAC tournament winner

The 2014–15 Monmouth Hawks men's basketball team represented Monmouth University during the 2014–15 NCAA Division I men's basketball season. The Hawks, led by fourth year head coach King Rice, played their home games at the Multipurpose Activity Center. They were members of the Metro Atlantic Athletic Conference. They finished the season 18–15, 13–7 in MAAC play to finish in a tie for third place. They advanced to the semifinals of the MAAC tournament where they lost to Iona.

== Roster ==
Number	Name	Position	Height	Weight	Year	Hometown
0	Josh James	Guard	6–2	190	Sophomore	Greenburgh, New York
1	Brice Kofane (Transfer Providence)	Forward	6–8	205	Senior	Yaoundé, Cameroon
2	Ba'shawn Mickens	Guard	6–0	190	Freshman	Summit, New Jersey
3	Max DiLeo	Guard	6–1	195	Senior	Cinnaminson, New Jersey
4	Greg Noack	Forward	6–8	195	Sophomore	Bethlehem, Pennsylvania
5	Deon Jones	Guard	6–6	210	Junior	Wilmington, Delaware
10	Micah Seaborn	Guard	6–5	195	Freshman	Arlington, Texas
11	Je'lon Hornbeak (Transfer Oklahoma)	Guard	6–3	190	Junior	Arlington, Texas: Hornbeak will not play this season due to transferring requirements, will have 2 years of eligibility beginning in 2015–2016.
12	Justin Robinson	Guard	5–8	160	Sophomore	Lake Katrine, New York
13	Andrew Nicholas	Guard	6–6	225	Senior	Wrightsville, Pennsylvania
15	Daniel Pillari	Forward	5–10	170	Freshman	Oceanport, New Jersey
23	Austin Tilghman	Guard	6–1	225	Freshman	Middletown, Delaware
30	Collin Stewart	Guard	6–7	195	Sophomore	Glenville, New York
33	Zac Tillman	Center	6–10	280	Sophomore	Yeadon, Pennsylvania
43	Chris Brady	Center	6–10	240	Sophomore	Greenlawn, New York

== Schedule ==
Date time, TV	Opponent	Result	Record	Site (attendance) city, state
Exhibition
11/08/2014*; 7:00 pm	Wesley	W 84–72		Multipurpose Activity Center (585); West Long Branch, NJ
Regular season
11/14/2014*; 7:00 pm	at West Virginia	L 54–64	0–1	WVU Coliseum (6,792); Morgantown, WV
11/21/2014*; 7:30 pm	Bethune-Cookman; CBE Hall of Fame Classic	W 73–50	1–1	Multipurpose Activity Center (1,428); West Long Branch, NJ
11/22/2014*; 7:30 pm	Central Connecticut; CBE Hall of Fame Classic	W 65–50	2–1	Multipurpose Activity Center (1,357); West Long Branch, NJ
11/23/2014*; 4:30 pm	Towson; CBE Hall of Fame Classic	L 75–79 ^{OT}	2–2	Multipurpose Activity Center (1,225); West Long Branch, NJ
11/28/2014*; 7:00 pm, BTN	at Maryland; CBE Hall of Fame Classic	L 56–61	2–3	Xfinity Center (9,139); College Park, MD
11/30/2014*; 7:00 pm, ESPN3	at SMU	L 51–63	2–4	Moody Coliseum (6,852); University Park, TX
12/04/2014; 7:00 pm	at Marist	W 57–50	3–4 (1–0)	McCann Field House (1,283); Poughkeepsie, NY
12/07/2014; 4:30 pm	Iona	W 92–89	4–4 (2–0)	Multipurpose Activity Center (1,484); West Long Branch, NJ
12/10/2014*; 7:00 pm, SNY	at Fordham	L 58–68 ^{OT}	4–5	Rose Hill Gymnasium (1,130); Bronx, NY
12/20/2014*; 4:00 pm	at Wagner	W 74–66	5–5	Spiro Sports Center (1,311); Staten Island, NY
12/23/2014*; 7:00 pm	St. Francis Brooklyn	L 46–71	5–6	Multipurpose Activity Center (985); West Long Branch, NJ
12/28/2014*; 3:00 pm	Rutgers	L 58–59	5–7	Multipurpose Activity Center (3,911); West Long Branch, NJ
01/02/2015; 7:00 pm	at Canisius	W 73–68	6–7 (3–0)	Koessler Athletic Center (1,032); Buffalo, NY
01/04/2015; 2:00 pm	at Niagara	W 66–50	7–7 (4–0)	Gallagher Center (981); Lewiston, NY
01/09/2015; 7:00 pm, ESPN3	Quinnipiac	L 64–68	7–8 (4–1)	Multipurpose Activity Center (1,512); West Long Branch, NJ
01/12/2015; 7:00 pm	at Rider	W 55–54	8–8 (5–1)	Alumni Gymnasium (1,215); Lawrenceville, NJ
01/14/2015; 7:00 pm	Saint Peter's	L 61–62 ^{OT}	8–9 (5–2)	Multipurpose Activity Center (1,275); West Long Branch, NJ
01/18/2015; 4:30 pm, ESPN3	Fairfield	W 77–70	9–9 (6–2)	Multipurpose Activity Center (654); West Long Branch, NJ
01/21/2015*; 7:00 pm	at Penn	W 71–56	10–9	The Palestra (1,755); Philadelphia, PA
01/23/2015; 7:00 pm, ESPN3	Niagara	W 69–58	11–9 (7–2)	Multipurpose Activity Center (2,281); West Long Branch, NJ
01/25/2015; 2:00 pm	at Manhattan	L 64–71	11–10 (7–3)	Draddy Gymnasium (1,973); Riverdale, NY
01/30/2015; 7:00 pm, ESPNU	at Fairfield	W 60–59	12–10 (8–3)	Webster Bank Arena (2,851); Bridgeport, CT
02/01/2015; 2:00 pm, ESPN3	Manhattan	L 76–87	12–11 (8–4)	Multipurpose Activity Center (2,144); West Long Branch, NJ
02/05/2015; 7:00 pm	at Quinnipiac	L 52–72	12–12 (8–5)	TD Bank Sports Center (1,088); Hamden, CT
02/08/2015; 2:00 pm, ESPN3	Canisius	W 44–40	13–12 (9–5)	Multipurpose Activity Center (1,861); West Long Branch, NJ
02/14/2015; 7:00 pm	at Siena	W 83–64	14–12 (10–5)	Times Union Center (6,260); Albany, NY
02/16/2015; 7:00 pm, ESPN3	Marist	W 69–65	15–12 (11–5)	Multipurpose Activity Center (1,504); West Long Branch, NJ
02/19/2015; 7:00 pm, ESPN3	at Saint Peter's	W 63–58	16–12 (12–5)	Yanitelli Center (514); Jersey City, NJ
02/22/2015; 4:00 pm, ESPN3	at Iona	L 68–69	16–13 (12–6)	Hynes Athletic Center (2,611); New Rochelle, NY
02/26/2015; 8:00 pm, ESPN3	Rider	L 60–63	16–14 (12–7)	Multipurpose Activity Center (2,864); West Long Branch, NJ
03/01/2015; 4:30 pm, ESPN3	Siena	W 63–57	17–14 (13–7)	Multipurpose Activity Center (2,037); West Long Branch, NJ
MAAC tournament
03/07/2013; 2:30 pm, ESPN3	vs. Canisius; Quarterfinals	W 60–54	18–14	Times Union Center (5,159); Albany, NY
03/08/2013; 4:30 pm, ESPN3	vs. Iona; Quarterfinals	L 77–95	18–15	Times Union Center (2,752); Albany, NY
*Non-conference game. ^{#}Rankings from AP Poll. (#) Tournament seedings in parentheses. All times are in Eastern Time.
