= 2014–15 Manhattan Jaspers basketball team =

American college basketball season

2014–15 Manhattan Jaspers basketball

MAAC Tournament champions

NCAA tournament, First Four
- Conference: Metro Atlantic Athletic Conference
- Record: 19–14 (13–7 MAAC)
- Head coach: Steve Masiello (4th season)
- Assistant coaches: Matt Grady; Rasheen Davis; Mike Bramucci
- Home arena: Draddy Gymnasium

2014–15 MAAC men's basketball standings
	Conf.				Overall
Team	W		L	PCT	W		L	PCT
Iona	17	–	3	.850	26	–	9	.743
Rider	15	–	5	.750	21	–	12	.636
Manhattan †	13	–	7	.650	19	–	14	.576
Monmouth	13	–	7	.650	18	–	15	.545
Canisius	11	–	9	.550	18	–	15	.545
Quinnipiac	9	–	11	.450	15	–	15	.500
Saint Peter's	8	–	12	.400	16	–	18	.471
Siena	7	–	13	.350	11	–	20	.355
Niagara	7	–	13	.350	8	–	22	.267
Fairfield	5	–	15	.250	7	–	24	.226
Marist	5	–	15	.250	7	–	25	.219
† 2015 MAAC tournament winner

The 2014–15 Manhattan Jaspers basketball team represented Manhattan College during the 2014–15 NCAA Division I men's basketball season. The Jaspers, led by fourth year head coach Steve Masiello, played their home games at Draddy Gymnasium and were members of the Metro Atlantic Athletic Conference. They finished the season 19–14, 13–7 in MAAC play to finish in a tie for third place. They defeated Marist, Saint Peter's and Iona to win the MAAC tournament to receive an automatic bid to the NCAA tournament where they lost in the First Four to Hampton.

== Roster ==
2014–15 Manhattan Jaspers men's basketball team
#	Name	Position	Height	Weight	Year	Hometown
0	Shane Richards	Forward	6–5	185	Junior	New York City, New York
1	Ashton Pankey	Forward	6–10	225	RS Junior	The Bronx, New York
2	Tyler Wilson	Guard	6–0	175	Sophomore	The Bronx, New York
3	Samson Usilo	Guard	6–4	205	Freshman	Lagos, Nigeria
4	Zane Waterman	Forward	6–9	220	Freshman	Fayetteville, North Carolina
12	RaShawn Stores	Guard	5–11	190	Junior	The Bronx, New York
13	Emmy Andújar	Forward	6–6	205	Senior	The Bronx, New York
14	Calvin Crawford	Forward	6–6	205	Freshman	Middletown, New York
15	Samson Akilo	Forward	6–8	210	Freshman	Lagos, Nigeria
20	Jermaine Lawrence	Forward	6–10	210	Sophomore	Queens, New York
23	Rich Williams	Guard	6–5	190	Sophomore	Brooklyn, New York
30	Trevor Glassman	Guard	6–3	200	Sophomore	Bedford, New Hampshire
32	Carlton Allen	Center	6–10	240	Sophomore	Ewing, New Jersey
33	Donovan Kates	Guard	6–6	200	Senior	Hopkinsville, Kentucky

== Schedule ==
Date time, TV	Rank^{#}	Opponent^{#}	Result	Record	Site (attendance) city, state
Exhibition
11/08/2014*; 8:30 pm		LIU Post	W 78–67		Draddy Gymnasium (1,208); Riverdale, NY
Regular season
11/15/2014*; 1:00 pm, ESPN3		at Florida State; Hall of Fame Tip Off	L 66–81	0–1	Donald L. Tucker Civic Center (6,251); Tallahassee, Florida
11/18/2014*; 11:00 am, ESPN2		at Massachusetts; Hall of Fame Tip Off/ESPN College Hoops Tip-Off Marathon	L 68–77 ^{OT}	0–2	Mullins Center (4,736); Amherst, MA
11/22/2014*; 5:30 pm		vs. Binghamton; Hall of Fame Tip Off	W 78–63	1–2	Mohegan Sun Arena (1,121); Uncasville, CT
11/23/2014*; 8:00 pm		vs. Northeastern; Hall of Fame Tip Off	L 51–65	1–3	Mohegan Sun Arena (717); Uncasville, CT
11/29/2014*; 4:00 pm		at George Mason	L 63–64	1–4	Patriot Center (2,773); Fairfax, VA
12/05/2014; 7:00 pm, ESPN3		at Fairfield	L 54–67	1–5 (0–1)	Webster Bank Arena (1,947); Fairfield, CT
12/07/2014; 2:00 pm		Marist	W 60–38	2–5 (1–1)	Draddy Gymnasium (1,350); Riverdale, NY
12/14/2014*; 4:00 pm		vs. Rutgers; Madison Square Garden Holiday Festival	L 55–63	2–6	Madison Square Garden (8,074); New York City, NY
12/17/2014*; 7:00 pm, ESPN3		at Pittsburgh	L 56–65	2–7	Peterson Events Center (8,149); Pittsburgh, PA
12/20/2014*; 7:00 pm		Morgan State	W 73–69	3–7	Draddy Gymnasium (1,174); Riverdale, NY
12/22/2014*; 6:00 pm, SNY		vs. Fordham; Battle of the Bronx/Brooklyn Hoops Holiday Invitational	W 71–57	4–7	Barclays Center (6,519); Brooklyn, NY
01/02/2015; 7:00 pm		at Niagara	L 61–73	4–8 (1–2)	Gallagher Center (905); Lewiston, NY
01/04/2015; 2:00 pm		at Canisius	W 63–60	5–8 (2–2)	Koessler Athletic Center (1,011); Buffalo, NY
01/07/2015; 7:00 pm		Saint Peter's	W 68–63	6–8 (3–2)	Draddy Gymnasium (1,150); Riverdale, NY
01/10/2015; 7:00 pm		Niagara	W 84–75	7–8 (4–2)	Draddy Gymnasium (1,312); Riverdale, NY
01/16/2015; 7:00 pm		at Saint Peter's	W 72–65 ^{OT}	8–8 (5–2)	Yanitelli Center (518); Jersey City, NJ
01/18/2015; 2:00 pm		Rider	L 79–82 ^{OT}	8–9 (5–3)	Draddy Gymnasium (1,112); Riverdale, NY
01/23/2015; 7:00 pm		at Quinnipiac	L 59–73	8–10 (5–4)	TD Bank Sports Center (3,038); Hamden, CT
01/25/2015; 2:00 pm		Monmouth	W 71–64	9–10 (6–4)	Draddy Gymnasium (1,973); Riverdale, NY
01/30/2015; 7:00 pm		Siena	W 87–79	10–10 (7–4)	Draddy Gymnasium (2,018); Riverdale, NY
02/01/2015; 2:00 pm, ESPN3		at Monmouth	W 87–76	11–10 (8–4)	Multipurpose Activity Center (2,144); West Long Branch, NJ
02/06/2015; 7:00 pm		Canisius	W 78–69	12–10 (9–4)	Draddy Gymnasium (1,389); Riverdale, NY
02/08/2015; 2:00 pm		at Rider	L 77–85	12–11 (9–5)	Alumni Gymnasium (1,650); Lawrenceville, NJ
02/13/2015; 10:00 pm, ESPNU		Iona	L 67–70	12–12 (9–6)	Draddy Gymnasium (2,520); Riverdale, NY
02/15/2014; 2:00 pm		Fairfield	W 79–70	13–12 (10–6)	Draddy Gymnasium (1,317); Riverdale, NY
02/21/2015; 7:00 pm		at Siena	W 80–74	14–12 (11–6)	Times Union Center (6,809); Albany, NY
02/23/2014; 7:00 pm		at Marist	W 67–54	15–12 (12–6)	McCann Field House (1,211); Poughkeepsie, NY
02/27/2015; 7:00 pm, ESPN2		at Iona	L 75–79	15–13 (12–7)	Hynes Athletic Center (2,611); New Rochelle, NY
03/01/2015; 2:00 pm, ESPN3		Quinnipiac	W 69–65	16–13 (13–7)	Draddy Gymnasium (1,819); Riverdale, NY
MAAC tournament
03/07/2015; 8:00 pm		vs. Marist; Quarterfinals	W 74–58	17–13	Times Union Center (3,120); Albany, NY
03/08/2015; 7:00 pm		vs. Saint Peter's; Semifinals	W 65–48	18–13	Times Union Center (2,752); Albany, NY
03/09/2015; 9:00 pm, ESPN2		vs. Iona; Championship game	W 79–69	19–13	Times Union Center (2,963); Albany, NY
NCAA tournament
03/17/2015*; 6:40 pm, truTV	No. (16 MW)	vs. (16 MW) Hampton; First Four	L 64–74	19–14	UD Arena (12,124); Dayton, OH
*Non-conference game. ^{#}Rankings from AP Poll. (#) Tournament seedings in parentheses. All times are in Eastern Time. (#) during NCAA Tournament is seed with Region MW=Midwest.
