= 2014–15 Canisius Golden Griffins men's basketball team =

American college basketball season

2014–15 Canisius Golden Griffins men's basketball
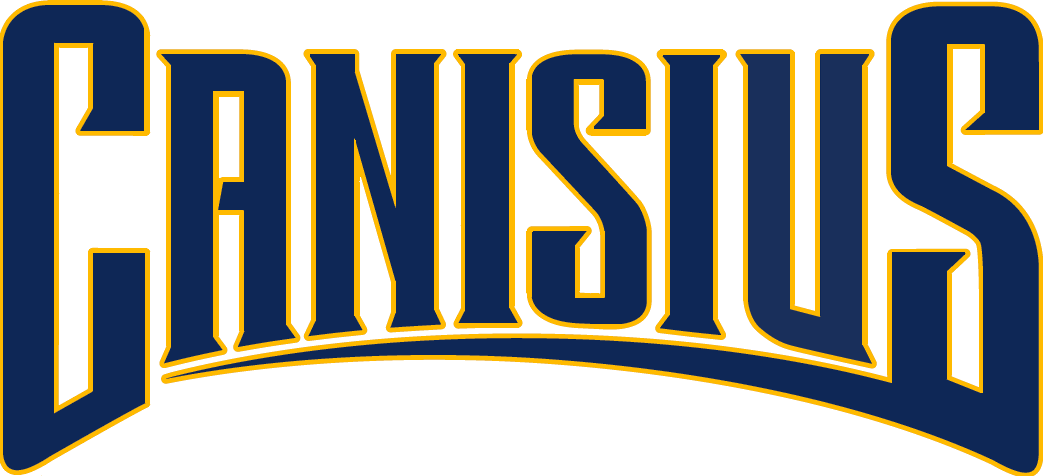

CIT, Quarterfinals
- Conference: Metro Atlantic Athletic Conference
- Record: 18–15 (11–9 MAAC)
- Head coach: Jim Baron (3rd season)
- Assistant coaches: Pat Clarke; Fred Dupree; Mike Iuzzolino
- Home arena: Koessler Athletic Center

2014–15 MAAC men's basketball standings
	Conf.				Overall
Team	W		L	PCT	W		L	PCT
Iona	17	–	3	.850	26	–	9	.743
Rider	15	–	5	.750	21	–	12	.636
Manhattan †	13	–	7	.650	19	–	14	.576
Monmouth	13	–	7	.650	18	–	15	.545
Canisius	11	–	9	.550	18	–	15	.545
Quinnipiac	9	–	11	.450	15	–	15	.500
Saint Peter's	8	–	12	.400	16	–	18	.471
Siena	7	–	13	.350	11	–	20	.355
Niagara	7	–	13	.350	8	–	22	.267
Fairfield	5	–	15	.250	7	–	24	.226
Marist	5	–	15	.250	7	–	25	.219
† 2015 MAAC tournament winner

The 2014–15 Canisius Golden Griffins men's basketball team represented Canisius College during the 2014–15 NCAA Division I men's basketball season. The Golden Griffins, led by third year head coach Jim Baron, played their home games at the Koessler Athletic Center and were members of the Metro Atlantic Athletic Conference. They finished the season 18–15, 11–9 in MAAC play to finish in fifth place. They lost in the quarterfinals of the MAAC tournament to Monmouth. They were invited to the CollegeInsider.com Tournament where they defeated Dartmouth in the first round and Bowling Green in the second round before losing in the quarterfinals to NJIT.

== Roster ==
Number	Name	Position	Height	Weight	Year	Hometown
1	Zach Lewis	Guard	6–3	175	Sophomore	Windsor, Connecticut
2	Jermaine Crumpton	Forward	6–6	240	RS–Freshman	Niagara Falls, New York
3	Raven Owen	Guard	5–11	165	Freshman	Staten Island, New York
4	Jeremiah Williams	Guard	5–11	165	Senior	Grand Rapids, Michigan
5	Kassius Robertson	Guard	6–3	169	RS–Freshman	Toronto, Ontario, Canada
10	Cassidy Ryan	Forward	6–6	215	Freshman	Mississauga, Ontario
11	Jan Grzeliński	Guard	5–10	160	Freshman	Wrocław, Poland
13	Isaiah Gurley	Guard	6–3	185	Freshman	Brooklyn, New York
14	Kevin Bleeker	Center	6–10	225	RS–Junior	Alkmaar, Netherlands
22	Phil Valenti	Forward	6–7	195	RS–Sophomore	Victor, New York
23	Jamal Reynolds	Guard	6–5	172	Junior	Pickering, Ontario
25	Adam Weir	Guard	6–4	185	RS–Freshman	Tonawanda, New York
50	Josiah Heath	Forward	6–9	230	Senior	Rochester, New York

== Schedule ==
Date time, TV	Opponent	Result	Record	Site (attendance) city, state
Exhibition
11/01/2014*; 1:00 pm	Ryerson	W 79–76		Koessler Athletic Center (822); Buffalo, NY
11/11/2014*; 7:00 pm	Daemen	L 81–83 ^{OT}		Koessler Athletic Center (1,242); Buffalo, NY
Regular season
11/15/2014*; 2:00 pm	Vermont	W 64–60	1–0	Koessler Athletic Center (1,340); Buffalo, NY
11/18/2014*; 7:00 pm	at Lehigh	W 63–51	2–0	Stabler Arena (711); Bethlehem, PA
11/22/2014*; 4:00 pm	at St. Bonaventure	L 53–59	2–1	Reilly Center (4,489); St. Bonaventure, NY
11/26/2014*; 7:00 pm	at Cornell	L 60–67	2–2	Newman Arena (750); Ithaca, NY
11/29/2014*; 4:15 pm	vs. Buffalo; Big 4 Basketball Classic	L 57–72	2–3	First Niagara Center (7,191); Buffalo, NY
12/03/2014; 7:00 pm	at Saint Peter's	W 60–57	3–3 (1–0)	Yanitelli Center (518); Jersey City, NJ
12/06/2014; 3:00 pm, ESPN3	at Niagara; Battle of the Bridge	W 77–64	4–3 (2–0)	Gallagher Center (1,754); Lewiston, NY
12/13/2014*; 4:00 pm	at Massachusetts	L 58–75	4–4	Mullins Center (3,148); Amherst, MA
12/18/2014*; 7:00 pm	Stony Brook	W 60–59 ^{OT}	5–4	Koessler Athletic Center (877); Buffalo, NY
12/21/2014*; 2:00 pm	Holy Cross	W 67–48	6–4	Koessler Athletic Center (1,032); Buffalo, NY
12/30/2014*; 7:00 pm	UMKC	W 67–55	7–4	Koessler Athletic Center (1,227); Buffalo, NY
01/02/2015; 7:00 pm	Monmouth	L 68–73	7–5 (2–1)	Koessler Athletic Center (1,032); Buffalo, NY
01/04/2015; 2:00 pm	Manhattan	L 60–63	7–6 (2–2)	Koessler Athletic Center (1,011); Buffalo, NY
01/08/2015; 7:00 pm	at Marist	W 67–52	8–6 (3–2)	McCann Field House (N/A); Poughkeepsie, NY
01/10/2015; 2:00 pm	at Iona	L 76–79	8–7 (3–3)	Hynes Athletic Center (1,651); New Rochelle, NY
01/16/2015; 7:00 pm	Siena	W 83–49	9–7 (4–3)	Koessler Athletic Center (1,407); Buffalo, NY
01/18/2015; 2:00 pm	Iona	W 78–74	10–7 (5–3)	Koessler Athletic Center (1,524); Buffalo, NY
01/22/2015; 8:00 pm, ESPN3	at Fairfield	W 64–50	11–7 (6–3)	Webster Bank Arena (2,360); Bridgeport, CT
01/24/2015; 7:00 pm	at Rider	L 46–59	11–8 (6–4)	Alumni Gymnasium (1,650); Lawrenceville, NJ
01/30/2015; 7:00 pm	Quinnipiac	W 63–57	12–8 (7–4)	Koessler Athletic Center (1,403); Buffalo, NY
02/01/2015; 2:00 pm	Marist	L 67–75	12–9 (7–5)	Koessler Athletic Center (1,335); Buffalo, NY
02/06/2015; 7:00 pm, ESPN3	at Manhattan	L 69–78	12–10 (7–6)	Draddy Gymnasium (1,389); Riverdale, NY
02/08/2015; 2:00 pm, ESPN3	at Monmouth	L 40–44	12–11 (7–7)	Multipurpose Activity Center (1,861); West Long Branch, NJ
02/13/2015; 7:00 pm	Rider	L 59–60	12–12 (7–8)	Koessler Athletic Center (983); Buffalo, NY
02/15/2015; 2:00 pm	Saint Peter's	W 69–55	13–12 (8–8)	Koessler Athletic Center (1,126); Buffalo, NY
02/19/2015; 7:00 pm	at Siena	W 69–63	14–12 (9–8)	Times Union Center (6,976); Albany, NY
02/21/2015; 1:00 pm	at Quinnipiac	W 65–63	15–12 (10–8)	TD Bank Sports Center (2,170); Hamden, CT
02/24/2015; 8:00 pm, ESPN3	Niagara; Battle of the Bridge	L 71–82	15–13 (10–9)	Koessler Athletic Center (2,196); Buffalo, NY
02/27/2015; 7:00 pm	Fairfield	W 72–65	16–13 (11–9)	Koessler Athletic Center (1,332); Buffalo, NY
MAAC tournament
03/07/2015; 2:30 pm, ESPN3	vs. Monmouth; Quarterfinals	L 54–60	16–14	Times Union Center (5,159); Albany, NY
CIT
03/18/2015*; 7:00 pm	Dartmouth; First round	W 87–72	17–14	Koessler Athletic Center (806); Buffalo, NY
03/21/2015*; 1:00 pm	at Bowling Green; Second round	W 82–59	18–14	Stroh Center (1,223); Bowling Green, OH
03/28/2015*; 7:30 pm	at NJIT; Quarterfinals	L 73–78	18–15	Fleisher Center (1,505); Newark, NJ
*Non-conference game. ^{#}Rankings from AP Poll. (#) Tournament seedings in parentheses. All times are in Eastern Time.
