= 2014–15 Marist Red Foxes men's basketball team =

American college basketball season

2014–15 Marist Red Foxes men's basketball
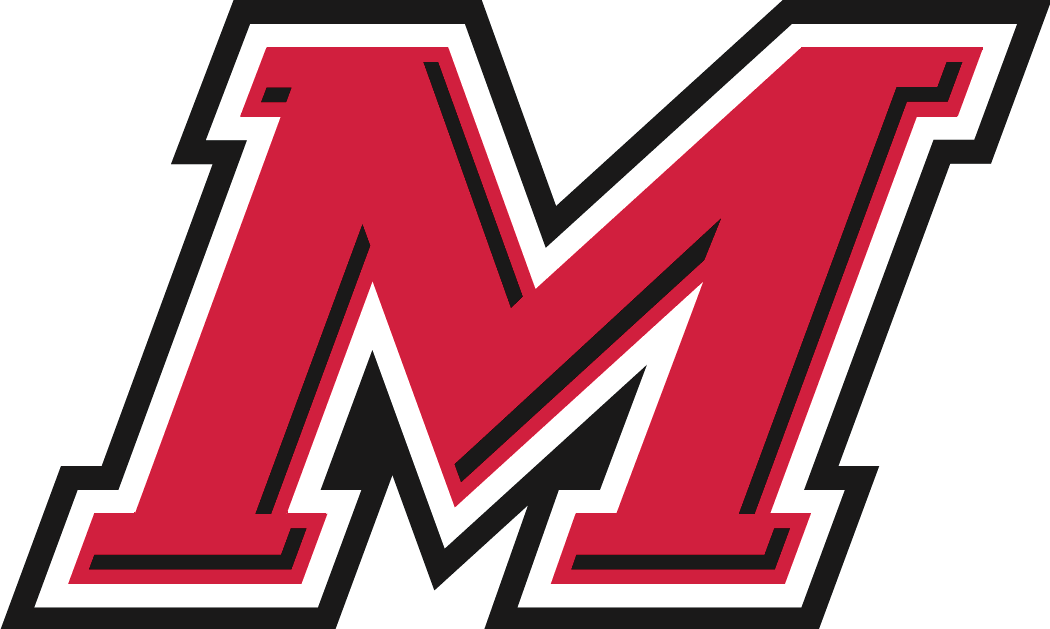
- Conference: Metro Atlantic Athletic Conference
- Record: 7–25 (5–15 MAAC)
- Head coach: Mike Maker (1st season)
- Assistant coaches: Paul Lee; Andy Johnston; C. J. Lee
- Home arena: McCann Arena

2014–15 MAAC men's basketball standings
	Conf.				Overall
Team	W		L	PCT	W		L	PCT
Iona	17	–	3	.850	26	–	9	.743
Rider	15	–	5	.750	21	–	12	.636
Manhattan †	13	–	7	.650	19	–	14	.576
Monmouth	13	–	7	.650	18	–	15	.545
Canisius	11	–	9	.550	18	–	15	.545
Quinnipiac	9	–	11	.450	15	–	15	.500
Saint Peter's	8	–	12	.400	16	–	18	.471
Siena	7	–	13	.350	11	–	20	.355
Niagara	7	–	13	.350	8	–	22	.267
Fairfield	5	–	15	.250	7	–	24	.226
Marist	5	–	15	.250	7	–	25	.219
† 2015 MAAC tournament winner

The 2014–15 Marist Red Foxes men's basketball team represented Marist College during the 2014–15 NCAA Division I men's basketball season. The Red Foxes, led by first year head coach Mike Maker, played their home games at the McCann Arena and were members of the Metro Atlantic Athletic Conference. They finished the season 7–25, 5–15 in MAAC play to finish in a tie for tenth place. They advanced to the quarterfinals of the MAAC tournament where they lost to Manhattan.

== Previous season ==
The Red Foxes finished the 2013–14 season 12–19, 9–11 in MAAC play to finish in a three way tie for sixth place. They lost in the first round of the MAAC tournament where they lost to Niagara. Following the season, head coach Jeff Bower resigned to take the General manager position with the Detroit Pistons. Mike Maker was hired as his successor.

== Roster ==
2014–15 Marist Red Foxes men's basketball team
Players
Coaches

Pos.	#	Name	Height	Weight	Year	Previous school	Hometown
F	1	Kentrall Brooks	6 ft 8 in (2.03 m)	200 lb (91 kg)	So	St. Anthony (NJ)	Bronx, New York
G	4	Nick Colletta	6 ft 5 in (1.96 m)	190 lb (86 kg)	RS Fr	Glendora	Glendora, California
G	5	Khalid Hart	6 ft 2 in (1.88 m)	180 lb (82 kg)	RS So	Sanford School	Newark, Delaware
G	10	James Griffin	6 ft 5 in (1.96 m)	200 lb (91 kg)	Fr	Westwind Prep Academy	Brisbane, Queensland, Australia
G	11	K. J. Lee	6 ft 4 in (1.93 m)	185 lb (84 kg)	Fr	Salisbury School	Huntington Station, New York
F	15	Obi Momah	6 ft 7 in (2.01 m)	220 lb (100 kg)	Fr	Farmington	Farmington, Connecticut
F/C	20	R. J. Coil	6 ft 9 in (2.06 m)	225 lb (102 kg)	Fr	Ottawa Hills	Toledo, Ohio
G	21	Tourron Whitfield	6 ft 2 in (1.88 m)	170 lb (77 kg)	Sr	Archbishop Molloy	Valley Stream, New York
G/F	24	Manny Thomas	6 ft 5 in (1.96 m)	190 lb (86 kg)	Sr	Xaverian	Brooklyn, New York
F/C	25	Connor McClenaghan	6 ft 9 in (2.06 m)	215 lb (98 kg)	Fr	Hebron	Carrollton, Texas
G	32	T. J. Curry	6 ft 1 in (1.85 m)	190 lb (86 kg)	Sr	Christ the King	Brooklyn, New York
F	35	Phillip Lawrence-Ricks	6 ft 7 in (2.01 m)	190 lb (86 kg)	Jr	Mount St. Joseph	Baltimore, Maryland
G/F	40	Chavaughn Lewis	6 ft 5 in (1.96 m)	185 lb (84 kg)	Sr	St. Mary's (Manhasset, NY)	Queens, New York
C	44	Eric Truog	6 ft 10 in (2.08 m)	240 lb (109 kg)	Jr	Kenston	Chagrin Falls, Ohio

Head coach

- Mike Maker (Cal Baptist, 1st yr., 1988)

Assistant coach(es)

- Paul Lee (Columbia, 7th yr., 1986)
- Andy Johnston (New Hampshire, 1st yr., 1987)
- C.J. Lee (Michigan, 1st yr., 2008)

Legend

- (C) Team captain
- (S) Suspended
- (I) Ineligible
- (W) Walk-on
- Injured
- Current redshirt

Roster
Last update: 2014-10-31

== Schedule ==
Date time, TV	Rank^{#}	Opponent^{#}	Result	Record	Site (attendance) city, state
Regular season
11/14/2014*; 7:00 pm		at Bucknell	L 72–75	0–1	Sojka Pavilion (3,102); Lewisburg, PA
11/22/2014*; 7:00 pm		Army	L 62–76	0–2	McCann Arena (2,124); Poughkeepsie, NY
11/24/2014*; 6:00 pm		vs. Florida Gulf Coast; Gulf Coast Showcase quarterfinals	L 43–58	0–3	Germain Arena (2,118); Estero, FL
11/25/2014*; 2:30 pm		vs. Hawaii; Gulf Coast Showcase consolation round	L 55–62	0–4	Germain Arena (240); Estero, FL
11/26/2014*; 12:00 pm		vs. Fresno State; Gulf Coast Showcase 7th place game	W 68–64	1–4	Germain Arena (271); Estero, FL
12/01/2014*; 7:00 pm, ESPN3		at Boston College	L 61–79	1–5	Conte Forum (1,748); Chestnut Hill, MA
12/04/2014; 7:00 pm		Monmouth	L 50–57	1–6 (0–1)	McCann Arena (1,283); Poughkeepsie, NY
12/07/2014; 2:00 pm		at Manhattan	L 38–60	1–7 (0–2)	Draddy Gymnasium (1,350); Riverdale, NY
12/09/2014*; 7:30 pm		at Penn	L 42–59	1–8	Palestra (1,262); Philadelphia, PA
12/13/2014*; 1:00 pm		at VMI	L 77–92	1–9	Cameron Hall (1,048); Lexington, VA
12/20/2014*; 7:00 pm		Saint Joseph's	L 58–75	1–10	McCann Arena (1,158); Poughkeepsie, NY
12/28/2014*; 2:00 pm		at Elon	L 64–69	1–11	Alumni Gym (1,282); Elon, NC
01/02/2015; 7:00 pm		Rider	L 59–69	1–12 (0–3)	McCann Arena (1,172); Poughkeepsie, NY
01/04/2015; 3:00 pm		at Saint Peter's	L 67–79	1–13 (0–4)	Yanitelli Center (223); Jersey City, NJ
01/08/2015; 7:00 pm		Canisius	L 52–67	1–14 (0–5)	McCann Arena (N/A); Poughkeepsie, NY
01/11/2015; 7:00 pm		at Quinnipiac	L 54–66	1–15 (0–6)	TD Bank Sports Center (1,093); Hamden, CT
01/16/2015; 7:00 pm		at Fairfield	L 54–60	1–16 (0–7)	Webster Bank Arena (2,305); Fairfield, CT
01/18/2015; 2:00 pm		Quinnipiac	L 71–72	1–17 (0–8)	McCann Arena (1,121); Poughkeepsie, NY
01/23/2015; 7:00 pm		at Siena	L 60–69	1–18 (0–9)	Times Union Center (6,770); Albany, NY
01/25/2015; 2:00 pm		Fairfield	W 73–67	2–18 (1–9)	McCann Arena (1,452); Poughkeepsie, NY
01/30/2015; 7:00 pm, ESPN3		at Niagara	W 65–61	3–18 (2–9)	Gallagher Center (1,201); Lewiston, NY
02/01/2015; 2:00 pm		at Canisius	W 75–67	4–18 (3–9)	Koessler Athletic Center (1,335); Buffalo, NY
02/06/2015; 7:00 pm		Niagara	W 63–61	5–18 (4–9)	McCann Arena (1,547); Poughkeepsie, NY
02/08/2015; 2:00 pm		at Iona	L 67–89	5–19 (4–10)	Hynes Athletic Center (2,016); New Rochelle, NY
02/12/2015; 8:00 pm, ESPN3		Siena	L 64–66	5–20 (4–11)	McCann Arena (1,226); Poughkeepsie, NY
02/16/2015; 7:00 pm, ESPN3		at Monmouth	L 65–69	5–21 (4–12)	Multipurpose Activity Center (1,504); West Long Branch, NJ
02/20/2015; 9:00 pm, ESPNU		Iona	L 68–72	5–22 (4–13)	McCann Arena (1,277); Poughkeepsie, NY
02/23/2014; 7:00 pm		Manhattan	L 54–67	5–23 (4–14)	McCann Arena (1,211); Poughkeepsie, NY
02/27/2015; 7:00 pm		Saint Peter's	W 69–67	6–23 (5–14)	McCann Arena (N/A); Poughkeepsie, NY
03/01/2015; 2:00 pm, ESPN3		at Rider	L 49–59	6–24 (5–15)	Alumni Gymnasium (1,650); Lawrenceville, NJ
MAAC tournament
03/05/2015; 9:00 pm	(11)	vs. (6) Quinnipiac; First round	W 80–74	7–24	Times Union Center (4,062); Albany, NY
03/07/2015; 8:00 pm, ESPN3	(11)	vs. (3) Manhattan; Quarterfinals	L 58–74	7–25	Times Union Center (3,120); Albany, NY
*Non-conference game. ^{#}Rankings from AP Poll. (#) Tournament seedings in parentheses. All times are in Eastern Time.
