= 2015 MAAC men's basketball tournament =

- Classification: Division I
- Season: 2014–15
- Teams: 11
- Site: Times Union Center; Albany, New York
- Champions: Manhattan (5th title)
- Winning coach: Steve Masiello (2nd title)
- MVP: Ashton Pankey (Manhattan)
- Television: ESPN2, ESPN3

2014–15 MAAC men's basketball standings
	Conf.				Overall
Team	W		L	PCT	W		L	PCT
Iona	17	–	3	.850	26	–	9	.743
Rider	15	–	5	.750	21	–	12	.636
Manhattan †	13	–	7	.650	19	–	14	.576
Monmouth	13	–	7	.650	18	–	15	.545
Canisius	11	–	9	.550	18	–	15	.545
Quinnipiac	9	–	11	.450	15	–	15	.500
Saint Peter's	8	–	12	.400	16	–	18	.471
Siena	7	–	13	.350	11	–	20	.355
Niagara	7	–	13	.350	8	–	22	.267
Fairfield	5	–	15	.250	7	–	24	.226
Marist	5	–	15	.250	7	–	25	.219
† 2015 MAAC tournament winner

The 2015 Metro Atlantic Athletic Conference men's basketball tournament was the postseason men's basketball tournament for the Metro Atlantic Athletic Conference for the 2014–15 NCAA Division I men's basketball season. It was held from March 5–9, 2015 at the Times Union Center in Albany, New York. No. 3 seed Manhattan upset No. 1 seed Iona 79–69 in the championship game and received the conference's automatic bid to the 2015 NCAA tournament. This was Manhattan's second consecutive MAAC tournament championship, and their third straight appearance in the championship game, with all three games also being against Iona.

== Seeds ==
All 11 teams in the conference participate in the Tournament. The top five teams will receive byes to the quarterfinals. Teams are seeded by record within the conference, with a tiebreaker system to seed teams with identical conference records.

Seed	School	Conference	Tiebreaker	Tiebreaker 2
1	Iona	17–3		
2	Rider	15–5		
3	Manhattan	13–7	2–0 vs Monmouth	
4	Monmouth	13–7	0–2 vs Manhattan	
5	Canisius	11–9		
6	Quinnipiac	9–11		
7	St. Peter's	8–12		
8	Siena	7–13	2–0 vs Niagara	
9	Niagara	7–13	0–2 vs Siena	
10	Fairfield	5–15	1–1 vs Marist	1–3 vs Manh/Monm
11	Marist	5–15	1–1 vs Fairfield	0–4 vs Manh/Monm

== Schedule ==
Session	Game	Time*	Matchup^{#}	Score	Television
First round – Thursday, March 5
1	1	5:00 PM	No. 8 Siena vs No. 9 Niagara	71–54	
1	2	7:00 PM	No. 7 Saint Peter's vs No. 10 Fairfield	63–33	
1	3	9:00 PM	No. 6 Quinnipiac vs No. 11 Marist	74–80	
Quarterfinals – Saturday, March 7
2	4	12:00 PM	No. 1 Iona vs No. 8 Siena	74–71	ESPN3
2	5	2:30 PM	No. 4 Monmouth vs No. 5 Canisius	60–54	ESPN3
2	6	5:30 PM	No. 2 Rider vs No. 7 Saint Peter's	59–68	ESPN3
2	7	8:00 PM	No. 3 Manhattan vs No. 11 Marist	74–58	ESPN3
Semifinals – Sunday, March 8
3	8	4:30 PM	No. 1 Iona vs No. 4 Monmouth	95–77	ESPN3
3	9	7:00 PM	No. 3 Manhattan vs No. 7 Saint Peter's	65–48	ESPN3
Championship – Monday, March 9
4	10	9:00 PM	No. 1 Iona vs No. 3 Manhattan	69–79	ESPN2
*Game times in ET. #-Rankings denote tournament seeding.

== Bracket ==
First round Thursday, March 5
8	Siena	71
9	Niagara	54
7	Saint Peter's	63
10	Fairfield	33
6	Quinnipiac	74
11	Marist	80

Quarterfinals; Saturday, March 7 ESPN3
1	Iona	74
8	Siena	71
4	Monmouth	60
5	Canisius	54
2	Rider	59
7	Saint Peter's	68
3	Manhattan	74
11	Marist	58

Semifinals; Sunday, March 8 ESPN3
1	Iona	95
4	Monmouth	77
7	Saint Peter's	48
3	Manhattan	65

Championship; Monday, March 9 ESPN2
1	Iona	69
3	Manhattan	79
