= Vangelis Bebis =

Greek basketball player

Vangelis Bebis Βαγγέλης Μπέμπης
Free agent
- Position: Shooting guard / small forward

Personal information
- Born: February 1, 1995 (age 31) Athens, Greece
- Listed height: 6 ft 6 in (1.98 m)
- Listed weight: 184 lb (83 kg)

Career information
- College: Iona (2014–2015)
- Playing career: 2011–present

Career history
- 2011–2013: Ilysiakos
- 2013–2014: Ikaros Chalkidas
- 2015–2016: Lavrio
- 2016–2017: Gymnastikos S. Larissas
- 2017–2018: Doxa Lefkadas
- 2018–2019: Apollon Patras
- 2019–2020: EPG Baskets Koblenz
- 2020–2021: Dafni Dafniou
- 2021–2022: N.E. Megaridas
- 2022–2023: Ionikos Nikaias

Vangelis Bebis (alternate spellings: Evangelos, Bebis) (Greek: Βαγγέλης Μπέμπης; born January 7, 1995) is a Greek professional basketball player who last played for Ionikos Nikaias of the Greek Basket League.

== College career ==
In the 2014–15 season, Bebis played college basketball for the Iona Gaels team, at Iona College. He played in 27 games, and averaged 1.8 points, 0.7 rebounds, 0.3 assists, and 0.3 steals per game, in 8.6 minutes per game. In August 2015, after playing one season with Iona College, Bebis left the school, and returned to Greece to play professionally.

== Professional career ==
Bebis start his professional career with Ilysiakos in 2011. In 2015, he signed with Lavrio.

In 2022, he returned to the 1st division for Ionikos Nikaias. In 18 games, he averaged 0.7 points in 6 minutes per contest.
