= Draddy Gymnasium =

Multi-purpose arena in the Bronx, New York

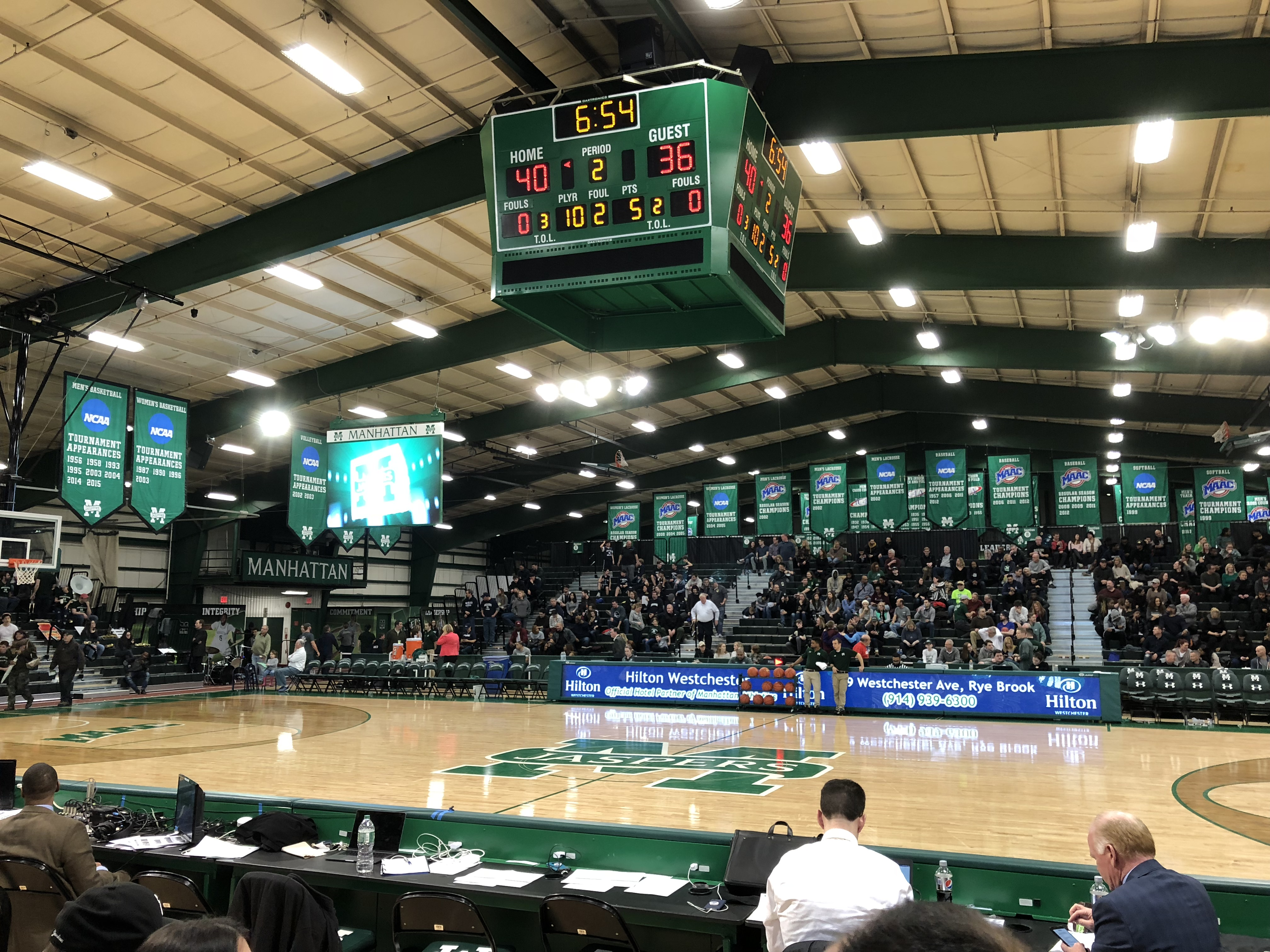
- Interactive map of Draddy Gymnasium
- Location: Bronx, New York
- Coordinates: 40.89073°N 73.900158°W
- Capacity: 2,345
- Surface: Hardwood

Construction
- Opened: 1978

Tenant
- Manhattan Jaspers

Draddy Gymnasium is a 2,345-seat multi-purpose arena in the Bronx, New York. It is located on the campus of Manhattan University and is the home of the Manhattan Jaspers athletic teams including men's and women's basketball and women's volleyball. The building has a 200 meter indoor track.

Draddy Gymnasium was named in the honor of the first wife and first son of alumnus Vincent dePaul Draddy, onetime quarterback at Manhattan University and later chairman of the College Football Hall of Fame. Draddy's son, Vincent Jr., was killed in an automobile accident in 1953. His wife, Ruth, died in 1974.

In 1985, Draddy Gymnasium was featured in a first season episode of The Cosby Show titled "Back to the Track, Jack", in which series protagonist Dr. Heathcliff Huxtable and his fellow former track teammates from Hillman College train for a masters relay race rematch against their former rivals from Norton University at Meadowlands Arena.

== See also ==
- List of NCAA Division I basketball arenas
