= Gallagher Center =

Multi-purpose arena in Lewiston, New York

- Frank and Barbara Layden Court
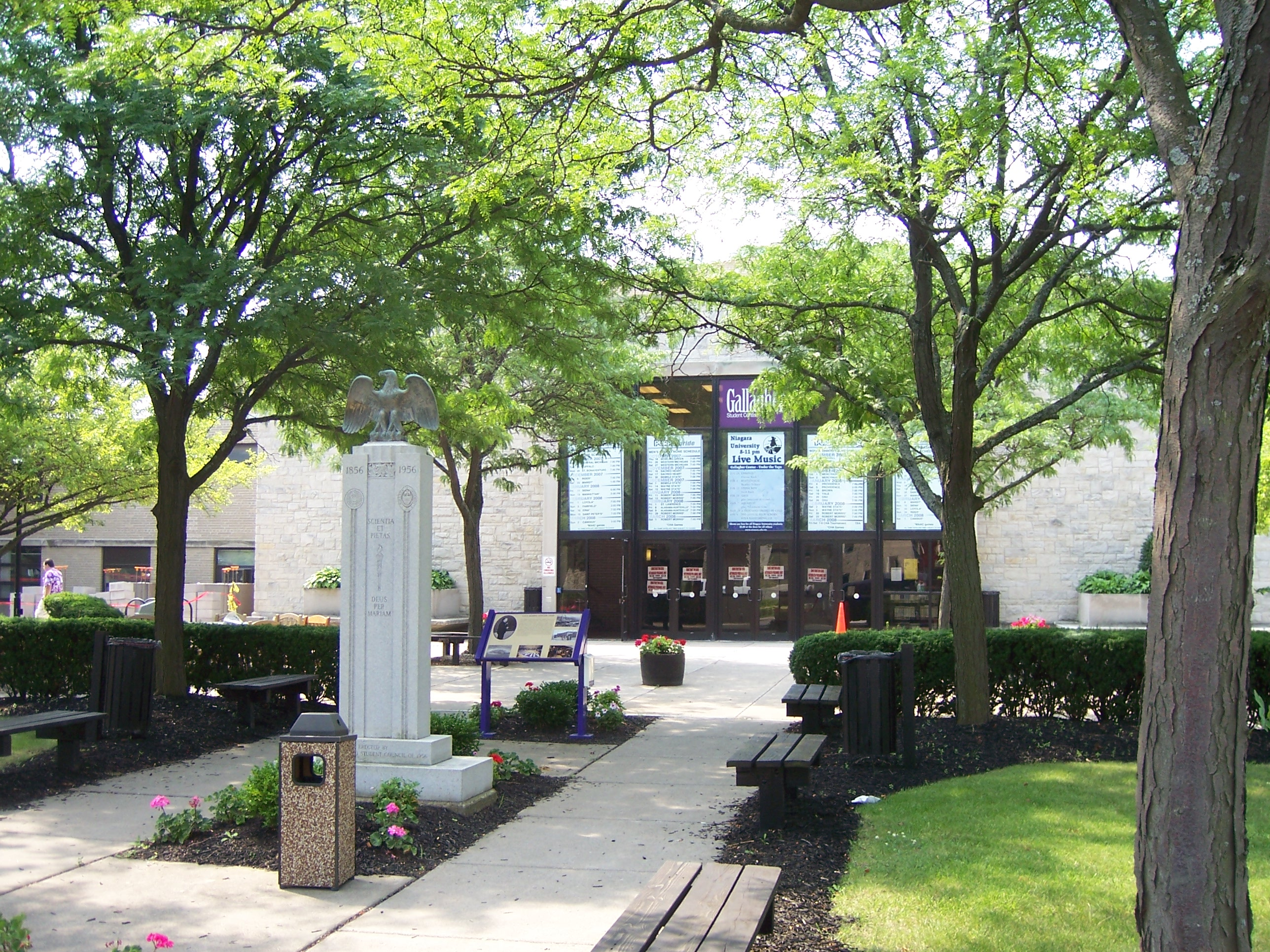
- Interactive map of Gallagher Center
- Former names: Niagara University Student Center (1949–1982)
- Location: 2009 Niagara University, Lewiston, New York 14109
- Coordinates: 43.137035°N 79.038026°W
- Owner: Niagara University
- Operator: Niagara University
- Capacity: 2,400
- Surface: Hardwood

Construction
- Opened: November 30, 1949
- Renovated: 1998
- Cost: $1.3 million (renovation)
- Architect: TRM Architecture

Tenant
- Niagara Purple Eagles

The Gallagher Center is a 2,400-seat multi-purpose arena at Niagara University's campus in Lewiston, New York. The structure was initially built in 1949 and substantially renovated in 1999. It is the home court of the Niagara Purple Eagles men's basketball and women's basketball and volleyball teams.

Originally known as the Niagara University Student Center, it was renamed in honor of John J. "Taps" Gallagher (1905–1982) on May 23, 1982. Coach Gallagher guided the Purple Eagles men's team for 31 seasons (1931–1943, 1946–1965), leading the team to 25 winning seasons, including 11 Little Three championships and seven appearances in the National Invitation Tournament when the NIT was the premiere postseason tournament. At the time of his retirement, he was the 12th winningest coach in college basketball history.

In 2014, the playing surface was named "Layden Court" in honor of former Purple Eagles coach Frank Layden and his wife, Barbara. Layden coached the Purple Eagles from 1968 to 1976, leading the Purple Eagles to their first NCAA Tournament appearance in 1970. He then went on to a 23-year coaching career in the NBA, most notably with the Utah Jazz.

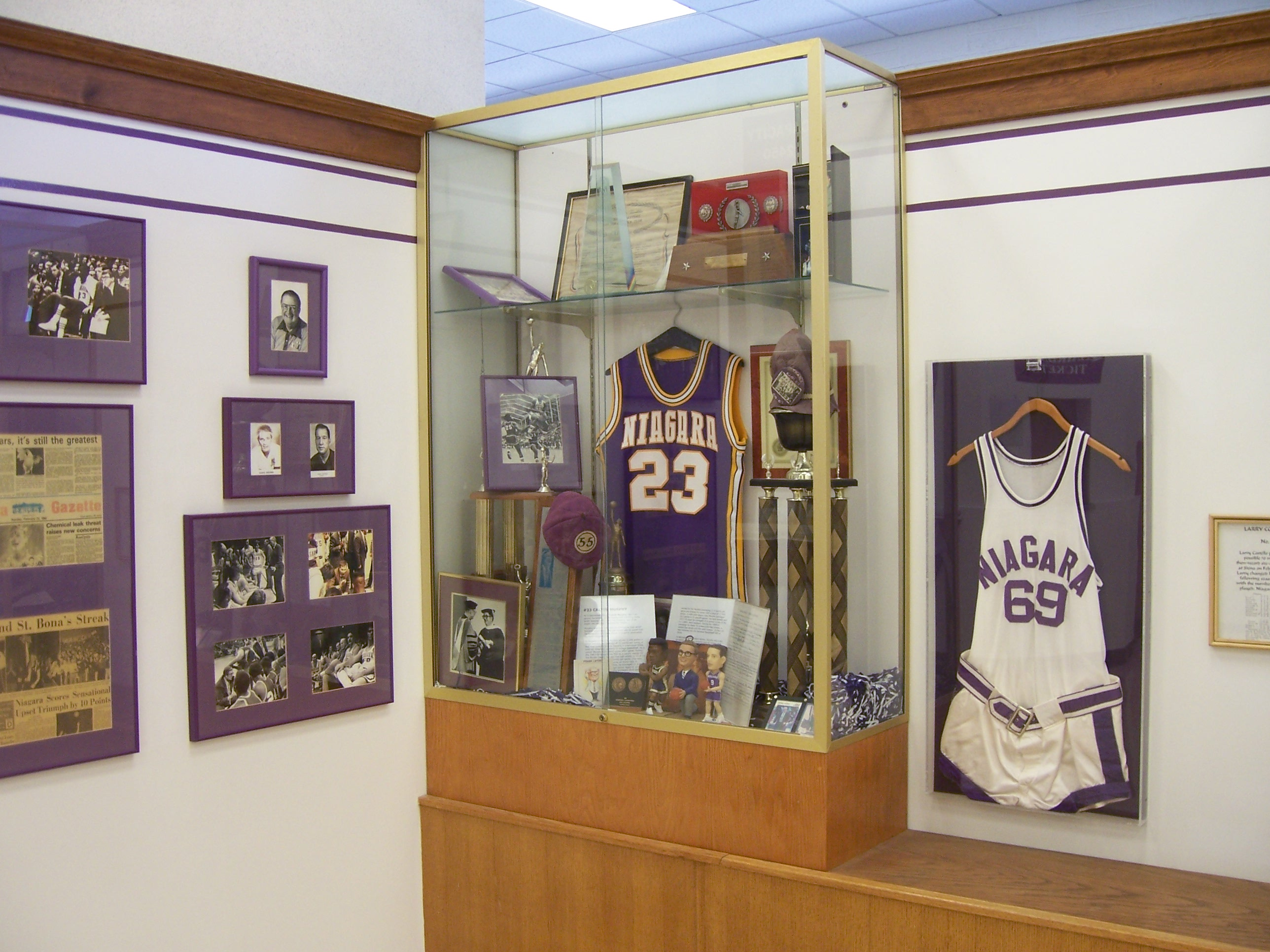
Gallagher Center also hosts the Niagara Hall of Fame

== Student Center ==
The lower level of Gallagher Center houses the Student Center and Campus Activities Office.

Additional offices located in the Gallagher Center include

- Campus Ministry
- NUSGA
- Student Life
- Multicultural and International Student Affairs
- Athletics
- WNIA Radio

== See also ==
- List of NCAA Division I basketball arenas
