= Yanitelli Center =

Athletic facility at Saint Peter's University in New Jersey, US

Yanitelli Center (Run Baby Run Arena)
- "The Bubble"
- Interactive map of Yanitelli Center (Run Baby Run Arena)
- Full name: Victor R. Yanitelli, S.J. Recreational Life Center
- Location: 2641 Kennedy Boulevard; Jersey City, NJ 07306
- Coordinates: 40.727648°N 74.073173°W
- Owner: Saint Peter's University
- Operator: Saint Peter's University
- Capacity: 3,200
- Surface: Hardwood
- Public transit: PATH: Journal Square NWK–WTC JSQ-33; JSQ-33 (via HOB); NJT Bus: 8, 9, 10, 14, 80, 87, 119

Construction
- Opened: November 29, 1975
- Renovated: 2020–2021
- Cost: $6 million ($35.9 million in 2025 dollars)

Tenants
- Saint Peter's Peacocks (NCAA) (1975–present); Jersey Jammers (USBL) (1986–1988)

The Victor R. Yanitelli, S.J. Recreational Life Center, known today as the Run Baby Run Arena, is a multipurpose athletic facility on the campus of Saint Peter's University, a private, coeducational Jesuit university in Jersey City, New Jersey. Notable for its air-supported "bubble," the Yanitelli Center opened on November 29, 1975 at a cost of $6 million and is named after the 17th president of the college. It was built on the site of the first campus building, Collins Memorial Gymnasium, where the men's basketball team played most of their home games into the 1950s and continued to practice until its demolition.

The facility is the home of the Saint Peter's Peacocks men's and women's basketball, volleyball, tennis and swimming and diving teams. For men's basketball games, collapsible bleachers are expanded to cover two of the main gymnasium's three full courts and provide a seating capacity of 3,200. For the women's games, only one of the bleachers is opened. The men's basketball team played the inaugural game at the Yanitelli Center against the Dartmouth Big Green losing 67–68. Prior to its opening, the men's basketball team hosted its home games at the nearby Jersey City Armory and still occasionally use the venue for high-profile games.

The building also houses The Eugene and Teresa Imperatore Swimming and Diving Center that features a 25 yd (23 m), 8 lane Olympic-size swimming pool with 1- and 3-meter diving boards and the Aquatics office. Additionally, a fitness center, weight room, racquetball court, and squash court are also located in the facility. The offices for the Department of Athletics are located on the third floor while the Department of Recreation and Intramural Sports are in the basement.

Students often refer to the building simply as "The Bubble" due to the air-supported roof, which is one of the most recognizable landmarks on the campus and in Jersey City. The Bubble covers five roof-top tennis courts and a jogging track. The tennis nets can be removed to provide facilities for indoor athletic practices as well as a venue for intramural sporting events.

== Renovation to Run Baby Run Arena ==
On July 22, 2020, Saint Peter’s University announced that through a $5 million lead gift from Thomas P. Mac Mahon, they would begin a phased renovation of the Yanitelli Center. The renovation included the creation of a more modern basketball/volleyball arena with new retractable bleachers with an allotment of chairback seating, a full replacement of the hardwood court surface, updated branding and signage, a reimagined entryway to the facility, enhanced lighting and new video scoreboards. It also supported the creation of a Hall of Fame to celebrate the legacy of Peacock athletics.

Mac Mahon, a 1968 graduate of Saint Peter's, and a member of the Saint Peter's University Board of Trustees, decided to honor his former 1967–68 teammates by naming the renovated space the "Run Baby Run Arena" after that team's nickname for its high-scoring offense. The new arena debuted on November 1, 2021, with Saint Peter's defeating New Jersey City University 90–66 in an exhibition game.

== Notable events ==
On December 13, 1975, Judy Collins held a concert with a full sixteen-piece orchestra at the Yanitelli Center. She performed her hit songs such as "Both Sides, Now" and "Send In the Clowns". She also performed a rendition of Joseph Haydn's Concerto in D major.

On March 3, 1977, the Yanitelli Center hosted the 1977 ECAC Tournament Semifinals of the Metropolitan region with the Seton Hall Pirates defeating the Army Black Knights 77–71.

On October 15, 1983, Billy Idol brought his Rebel Yell Tour to a raucous Yanitelli Center.

On November 27, 2002, Peacock freshman Keydren Clark set the arena record for most points in a game with 44 points in a 94–85 win over St. Francis (N.Y.). The previous record was 39 points scored by former Peacock Shelton Gibbs against the Marist Red Foxes on December 17, 1983.

On January 9, 2008, the Yanitelli Center hosted a campaign rally for former president of the United States Barack Obama in his successful bid to become the Democratic candidate in the 2008 U.S. presidential election.

On November 17, 2009, Saint Peter's hosted Monmouth University in a men's basketball game, with a 6:00 a.m. start time, as part of the second annual ESPN's 24–Hour College Hoops Tip-Off Marathon. The University hosted an 11-hour "all-nighter" of campus activities with free breakfast and a pre-game pep rally prior to the game. The Peacocks defeated the Hawks, 58–34.

On March 29, 2017, Saint Peter's hosted the semifinals of the 2017 CollegeInsider.com Postseason Tournament (CIT) at the Yanitelli Center marking the first time Saint Peter's ever hosted a national postseason tournament. The Peacocks would defeat the Furman Paladins 77–51 en route to their first-ever national postseason title.

On November 23, 2021, the Peacocks played their first official game in Run Baby Run Arena and opened it with a 64–62 win over the LIU Sharks.

In March of 2022, the arena hosted watch parties during Saint Peter's improbable Elite Eight run in the 2022 NCAA Division I men's basketball tournament. The Peacocks became the first ever 15-seed to accomplish the feat.

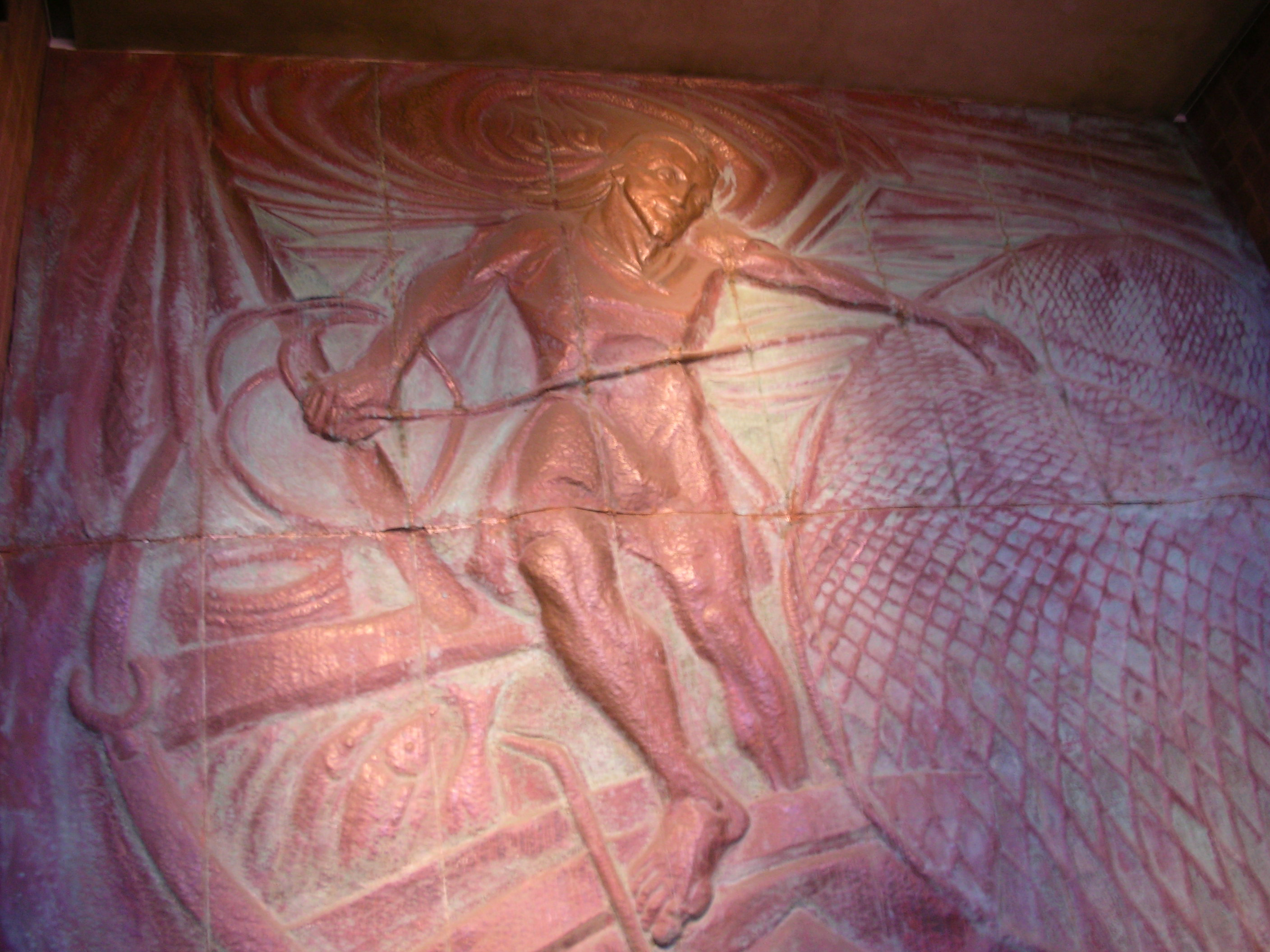
Relief sculpture of St. Peter in the entrance of the Yanitelli Center.

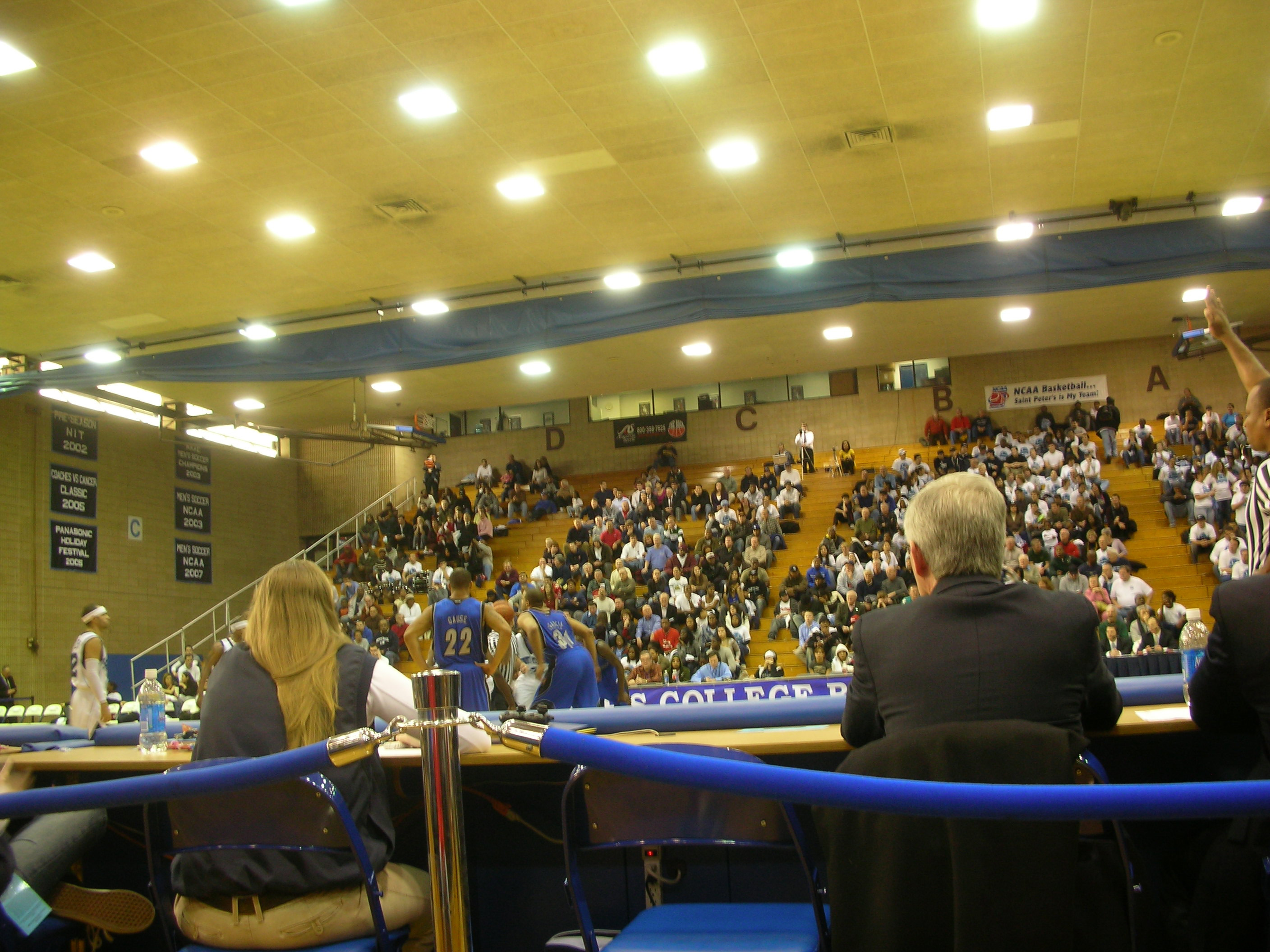
Saint Peter's playing Seton Hall University in men's basketball.

== See also ==
- List of NCAA Division I basketball arenas
