= Koessler Athletic Center =

Multi-purpose arena in Buffalo, New York

Coordinates: 42.920919°N 78.85754°W

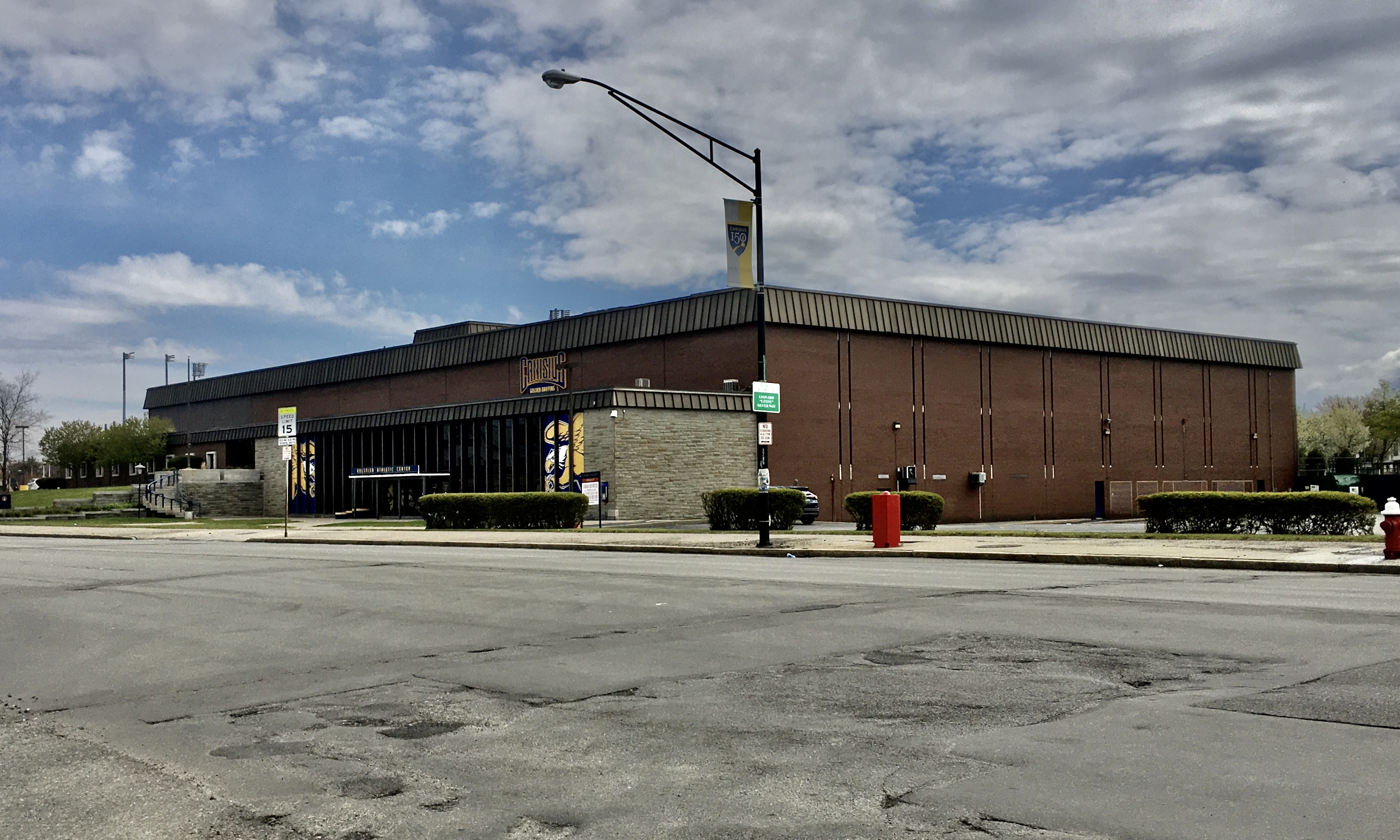
- Interactive map of Koessler Athletic Center
- Location: 1829 Main Street; Buffalo, NY 14208
- Owner: Canisius University
- Operator: Canisius University
- Capacity: 2,196

Construction
- Built: 1968
- Cost: $3 million ($27.8 million in 2025 dollars)

Tenants
- Canisius Golden Griffins (NCAA) (1999–present); Buffalo Stampede (PBL) (2009–2010)

Koessler Athletic Center is a 2,196-seat multi-purpose arena in Buffalo, New York on the campus of Canisius University. Built in 1968 at a cost of $3 million, it is home to the Golden Griffins men's and women's basketball, and women's volleyball teams. It was previously home to the Buffalo Stampede of the Premier Basketball League in 2009 and 2010.

== See also ==
- List of NCAA Division I basketball arenas
