= McCann Arena =

College sports arena in, New York, U.S.

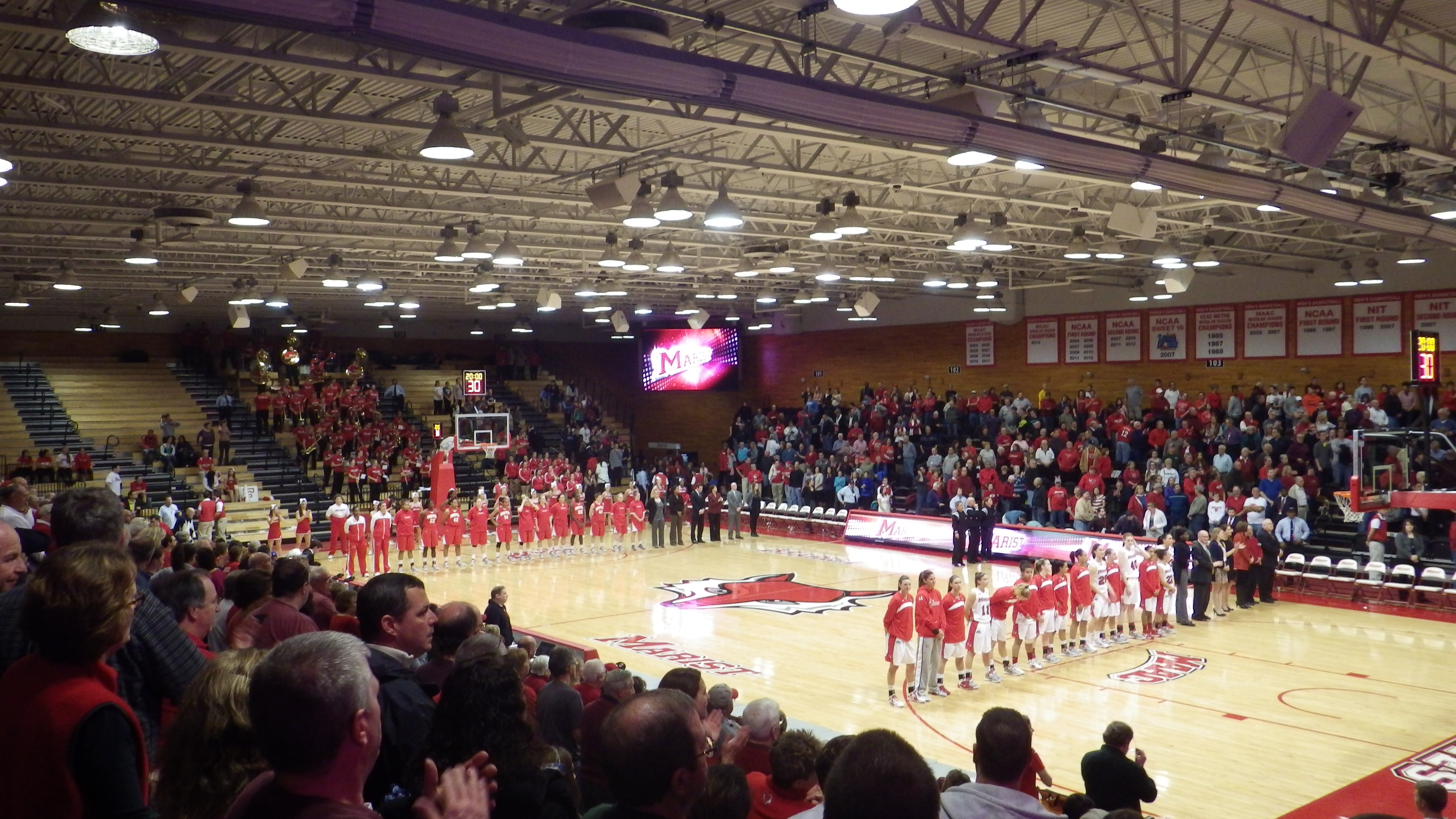
- Interactive map of McCann Arena
- Location: Poughkeepsie, New York, United States
- Coordinates: 41.718431°N 73.934°W
- Owner: Marist University
- Capacity: 3,200
- Executive suites: Yes
- Surface: Maple
- Scoreboard: Electronic/Video

Construction
- Opened: 1977
- Renovated: 2010

Tenant
- Marist College Red Foxes basketball (1977–present)

McCann Arena (or McCann Field House) is a 3,200-seat multi-purpose arena in Poughkeepsie, New York, United States. It was built in 1977 and is home to the Marist University Red Foxes men's and women's basketball and women's volleyball teams.

The arena's namesake is James J. McCann. McCann was born in Poughkeepsie in 1880, and operated, along with his family, the McCann Feed and Grain Store on Main Street. McCann did well in the stock market and used the assets to establish the McCann Foundation in 1967, two years before his death, which began awarding money in 1969 for "progressive human welfare work."

A maple floor was originally donated by former National Basketball Association (NBA) All-Star Rik Smits for use by his alma mater. Following an accidental soaking of the court by a fire sprinkler, Smits re-donated a new court. A display honoring Smits, including an Indiana Pacers jersey, can be found next to the basketball court. Another capital improvement in 2005 included the introduction of a 40-foot (12 m) NBA-style scorer's table. This project featured enhanced seating along the North baseline and an imposing 19-foot (5.8 m) high student section along the south baseline. The student section and pep band have seats located less than 6 feet (1.8 m) from the baseline, creating an imposing and loud student section.

A summer 2011 renovation to the field house upgraded the facility to more modern standards for the college's Division 1 indoor-athletics programs. The original bleachers were removed and replaced with chair-back seating, with corner seating added to maintain capacity and to create more of an atmosphere typically seen at a sports arena. The floor was replaced with a new, all-maple hardwood surface; the lobby and restrooms were renovated, and an addition to the south end of the field house provides new men's and women's locker rooms, as well as offices for both basketball teams. The project designer was Robert A.M. Stern Architects while construction was managed by Kirchhoff Consigli. The new floor was retrofit with a ScissorLoc™ DC subfloor system by Aacer Sports Flooring, complete with the PowerVent™ airflow system to ensure environmental control below the Northern Hard Rock Maple surface. Additionally video scoreboards were added in two opposite corners of the arena and a video table was added.

== See also ==
- List of NCAA Division I basketball arenas
