= 2022–23 Saint Peter's Peacocks men's basketball team =

American college basketball season

2022–23 Saint Peter's Peacocks men's basketball
- Conference: Metro Atlantic Athletic Conference
- Record: 14–18 (7–13 MAAC)
- Head coach: Bashir Mason (1st season)
- Assistant coaches: Pete Cipriano; Umar Shannon; Jim Mack
- Home arena: Run Baby Run Arena

2022–23 MAAC men's basketball standings
	Conf.				Overall
Team	W		L	PCT	W		L	PCT
Iona †	17	–	3	.850	27	–	8	.771
Rider	13	–	7	.650	16	–	14	.533
Quinnipiac	11	–	9	.550	20	–	12	.625
Siena	11	–	9	.550	17	–	15	.531
Niagara	10	–	10	.500	16	–	15	.516
Manhattan	10	–	10	.500	12	–	18	.400
Fairfield	9	–	11	.450	13	–	18	.419
Mount St. Mary's	8	–	12	.400	13	–	20	.394
Canisius	8	–	12	.400	10	–	20	.333
Saint Peter's	7	–	13	.350	14	–	18	.438
Marist	6	–	14	.300	13	–	20	.394
† 2023 MAAC tournament winner

The 2022–23 Saint Peter's Peacocks men's basketball team represented Saint Peter's University in the 2022–23 NCAA Division I men's basketball season. The Peacocks, led by first-year head coach Bashir Mason, played their home games at the Run Baby Run Arena in Jersey City, New Jersey as members of the Metro Atlantic Athletic Conference (MAAC).

== Previous season ==
The Peacocks finished the 2021–22 season 22–12, 14–6 in MAAC play, to finish in second place. They defeated Fairfield and Quinnipiac in the MAAC tournament to advance to the championship game. There they defeated Monmouth to win the tournament championship. As a result, they received the conference's automatic bid to the NCAA tournament, for the first time since 2011, as the No. 15 seed in the East region. The Peacocks defeated No. 2 seed Kentucky to become only the tenth No. 15 seed to upset a No. 2 seed in the tournament's history. They defeated Murray State to advance to the Sweet Sixteen, becoming only the third No. 15 seed and first MAAC team to make it to the second weekend. They defeated Purdue to advance to the Elite Eight becoming the first No. 15 seed to do so. In the Elite Eight, the Peacocks lost to 8th-seeded North Carolina. On April 5, Saint Peter's was ranked No. 24 nationally in the season's final Coaches' Poll.

On March 30, 2022, head coach and Seton Hall alum Shaheen Holloway left to take the head coaching position at his alma mater, where he previously was an assistant from 2010 to 2018. On April 12, Jersey City native Bashir Mason, who was the head coach for Wagner, was named Holloway's replacement.

== Roster ==
2022–23 Saint Peter's Peacocks men's basketball team
Players
Coaches

Pos.	#	Name	Height	Weight	Year	Previous school	Hometown
G	0	Latrell Reid	6 ft 3 in (1.91 m)	185 lb (84 kg)	Sr	Coffeyville CC	Willingboro, NJ
G	1	Brent Bland	6 ft 3 in (1.91 m)	205 lb (93 kg)	RS Fr	Half Hollow Hills West HS	Wheatley Heights, NY
G	2	Jayden Saddler	6 ft 1 in (1.85 m)	180 lb (82 kg)	GS	Southern	Aberdeen, MD
F	3	Corey Washington	6 ft 6 in (1.98 m)	180 lb (82 kg)	Fr	Sylvan Hills HS	Sherwood, AR
F	4	Jerry Ngopot	6 ft 10 in (2.08 m)	220 lb (100 kg)	RS Fr	Lee Academy	Bangui, Central African Republic
G	5	Jaylen Murray	5 ft 11 in (1.8 m)	175 lb (79 kg)	So	Putnam Science Academy	The Bronx, NY
F	10	Thomas Tut	6 ft 9 in (2.06 m)	210 lb (95 kg)	Fr	Solid Rock Academy	Juba, South Sudan
G	12	Kyle Cardaci	6 ft 2 in (1.88 m)	190 lb (86 kg)	GS	Bryant	Holmdel, NJ
G	13	Isiah Dasher	6 ft 4 in (1.93 m)	170 lb (77 kg)	Sr	Portland	Jersey City, NJ
G/F	22	Cam Young	6 ft 7 in (2.01 m)	210 lb (95 kg)	Jr	Bowling Green	Swedesboro, NJ
G	23	Alex Rivera	6 ft 1 in (1.85 m)	178 lb (81 kg)	Sr	LIU	Lowell, MA
F	24	Oumar Diahame	6 ft 10 in (2.08 m)	225 lb (102 kg)	Jr	The Patrick School	Dakar, Senegal
F	35	Mouhamed Sow	6 ft 9 in (2.06 m)	195 lb (88 kg)	RS Fr	The Patrick School	Dakar, Senegal

Head coach

- Bashir Mason (Drexel)

Assistant coach(es)

- Pete Cipriano (Southern)
- Umar Shannon (Saint Francis (PA))
- Jim Mack (Springfield)

Legend

- (C) Team captain
- (S) Suspended
- (I) Ineligible
- (W) Walk-on
- Injured
- Current redshirt

Roster
Last update: November 22, 2022

== Schedule and results ==
Date time, TV	Rank^{#}	Opponent^{#}	Result	Record	High points	High rebounds	High assists	Site (attendance) city, state
Regular season
November 7, 2022*; 7:00 p.m., ESPN3		NJIT	W 73–59	1–0	18 – Washington	8 – Washington	4 – Saddler	Run Baby Run Arena (1,129); Jersey City, NJ
November 12, 2022*; 12:00 p.m., FS2		at Seton Hall	L 44–80	1–1	13 – Murray	5 – 2 tied	3 – Murray	Prudential Center (9,488); Newark, NJ
November 15, 2022*; 7:00 p.m., ESPN+		Bucknell	W 82–71	2–1	22 – Murray	6 – Washington	7 – Murray	Run Baby Run Arena (612); Jersey City, NJ
November 19, 2022*; 2:00 p.m.		at St. Francis Brooklyn	L 58–61	2–2	14 – Saddler	10 – Reid	1 – 4 tied	Daniel Lynch Gymnasium (1,217); Brooklyn Heights, NY
November 23, 2022*; 1:00 p.m., ESPN+		SUNY Old Westbury	W 98–51	3–2	18 – Dasher	8 – Washington	6 – Reid	Run Baby Run Arena (366); Jersey City, NJ
November 27, 2022*; 2:00 p.m., ESPN+		Fairleigh Dickinson	W 77–63	4–2	18 – Murray	8 – Bland	8 – Reid	Run Baby Run Arena (532); Jersey City, NJ
December 1, 2022; 7:00 p.m., ESPN+		Mount St. Mary's	L 58–73	4–3 (0–1)	13 – 2 tied	7 – Tut	3 – Murray	Run Baby Run Arena (899); Jersey City, NJ
December 3, 2022; 7:00 p.m., ESPN3		at Fairfield	L 55–67	4–4 (0–2)	15 – Dasher	10 – Reid	5 – Murray	Leo D. Mahoney Arena (3,516); Fairfield, CT
December 10, 2022*; 1:00 p.m., ESPN+		at Saint Joseph's	L 57–73	4–5	16 – Dasher	8 – Reid	6 – Reid	Hagan Arena (1,279); Philadelphia, PA
December 13, 2022*; 7:00 p.m.		at Hartford	W 58–57	5–5	23 – Dasher	9 – Dasher	9 – Reid	Chase Arena (200); West Hartford, CT
December 18, 2022; 2:00 p.m., ESPN+		Quinnipiac	W 63–56	6–5 (1–2)	29 – Dasher	9 – Reid	5 – Reid	Run Baby Run Arena (267); Jersey City, NJ
December 22, 2022*; 6:30 p.m., BTN		at Maryland	L 45–75	6–6	10 – Washington	9 – Washington	4 – Reid	Xfinity Center (11,636); College Park, MD
December 30, 2022; 2:00 p.m., ESPN+		Manhattan	W 67–57	7–6 (2–2)	12 – 2 tied	8 – Washington	5 – 2 tied	Run Baby Run Arena (349); Jersey City, NJ
January 1, 2023; 4:00 p.m., ESPN3		at Iona	L 55–73	7–7 (2–3)	19 – Dasher	5 – Saddler	4 – Reid	Hynes Athletic Center (2,273); New Rochelle, NY
January 6, 2023; 7:00 p.m., ESPN+		at Siena	L 60–70	7–8 (2–4)	18 – Dasher	4 – Dasher	3 – Reid	MVP Arena (5,703); Albany, NY
January 8, 2023; 2:00 p.m., ESPN+		Canisius	L 60–67 ^{OT}	7–9 (2–5)	19 – Dasher	7 – Washington	2 – 3 tied	Run Baby Run Arena (541); Jersey City, NJ
January 13, 2023; 7:00 p.m., ESPN3		at Quinnipiac	L 51–58	7–10 (2–6)	18 – Saddler	5 – Dasher	4 – Reid	M&T Bank Arena (1,033); Hamden, CT
January 15, 2023; 7:00 p.m., ESPN+		Fairfield	L 52–56	7–11 (2–7)	13 – Dasher	7 – 2 tied	3 – Saddler	Run Baby Run Arena (443); Jersey City, NJ
January 20, 2023; 7:00 p.m., ESPN3		at Marist	W 61–57	8–11 (3–7)	16 – Dasher	9 – Dasher	3 – Murray	McCann Arena (673); Poughkeepsie, NY
January 22, 2023; 2:00 p.m., ESPN+		Niagara	L 57–59	8–12 (3–8)	16 – Murray	7 – Dasher	4 – Saddler	Run Baby Run Arena (563); Jersey City, NJ
January 28, 2023; 5:00 p.m., ESPN3		at Mount St. Mary's	W 73–62	9–12 (4–8)	18 – Murray	6 – Washington	5 – Dasher	Knott Arena (3,040); Emmitsburg, MD
February 3, 2023; 7:00 p.m., ESPN3		at Rider	L 61–82	9–13 (4–9)	20 – Dasher	6 – Dasher	4 – Reid	Alumni Gymnasium (1,650); Lawrenceville, NJ
February 10, 2023; 7:00 p.m., ESPN+		Marist	W 67–56	10–13 (5–9)	16 – Cardaci	9 – Bland	4 – Saddler	Run Baby Run Arena (758); Jersey City, NJ
February 12, 2023; 2:00 p.m., ESPN3		at Manhattan	L 52–68	10–14 (5–10)	16 – Cardaci	12 – Sow	3 – 2 tied	Draddy Gymnasium (784); Riverdale, NY
February 19, 2023; 2:00 p.m., ESPN+		Iona	L 53–73	10–15 (5–11)	12 – Cardaci	11 – Washington	3 – Saddler	Run Baby Run Arena (672); Jersey City, NJ
February 24, 2023; 7:00 p.m., ESPN3		at Canisius	L 53–66	10–16 (5–12)	14 – Dasher	6 – Murray	3 – Murray	Koessler Athletic Center (702); Buffalo, NY
February 26, 2023; 1:00 p.m., ESPN3		at Niagara	W 66–65	11–16 (6–12)	18 – Washington	5 – Washington	5 – Reid	Gallagher Center (1,109); Lewiston, NY
March 2, 2023; 7:00 p.m., ESPN+		Rider	L 60–73	11–17 (6–13)	20 – Murray	4 – tied	8 – Reid	Run Baby Run Arena (573); Jersey City, NJ
March 4, 2023; 2:00 p.m., ESPN3		Siena	W 73–72 ^{OT}	12–17 (7–13)	14 – Saddler	7 – Sow	4 – Saddler	Run Baby Run Arena (324); Jersey City, NJ
MAAC tournament
March 7, 2023; 7:00 p.m., ESPN+	(10)	vs. (7) Fairfield; First round	W 70–52	13–17	23 – Murray	7 – Washington	5 – Reid	Jim Whelan Boardwalk Hall; Atlantic City, NJ
March 8, 2023; 9:30 p.m., ESPN+	(10)	vs. (2) Rider; Quarterfinals	W 70–62	14–17	22 – Murray	9 – Sow	2 – tied	Jim Whelan Boardwalk Hall (2,043); Atlantic City, NJ
March 10, 2023; 8:30 p.m., ESPNEWS	(10)	vs. (11) Marist; Semifinals	L 57–69	14–18	14 – Murray	8 – tied	3 – Murray	Jim Whelan Boardwalk Hall (2,430); Atlantic City, NJ
*Non-conference game. ^{#}Rankings from AP poll. (#) Tournament seedings in parentheses. All times are in Eastern.
