= 2022–23 Quinnipiac Bobcats men's basketball team =

American college basketball season

2022–23 Quinnipiac Bobcats men's basketball
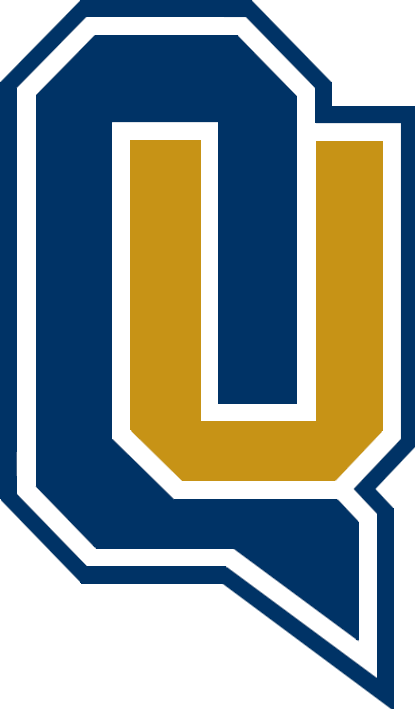
- Conference: Metro Atlantic Athletic Conference
- Record: 20–12 (11–9 MAAC)
- Head coach: Baker Dunleavy (6th season)
- Associate head coach: Tom Pecora
- Assistant coaches: Shaun Morris; Bradley Jacks; Tahar Sutton
- Home arena: M&T Bank Arena

2022–23 MAAC men's basketball standings
	Conf.				Overall
Team	W		L	PCT	W		L	PCT
Iona †	17	–	3	.850	27	–	8	.771
Rider	13	–	7	.650	16	–	14	.533
Quinnipiac	11	–	9	.550	20	–	12	.625
Siena	11	–	9	.550	17	–	15	.531
Niagara	10	–	10	.500	16	–	15	.516
Manhattan	10	–	10	.500	12	–	18	.400
Fairfield	9	–	11	.450	13	–	18	.419
Mount St. Mary's	8	–	12	.400	13	–	20	.394
Canisius	8	–	12	.400	10	–	20	.333
Saint Peter's	7	–	13	.350	14	–	18	.438
Marist	6	–	14	.300	13	–	20	.394
† 2023 MAAC tournament winner

The 2022–23 Quinnipiac Bobcats men's basketball team represent Quinnipiac University in the 2022–23 NCAA Division I men's basketball season. The Bobcats, led by sixth-year head coach Baker Dunleavy, play their home games at M&T Bank Arena in Hamden, Connecticut as members of the Metro Atlantic Athletic Conference.

== Previous season ==
The Bobcats finished the 2021–22 season 14–17, 7–13 in MAAC play to finish tied for last place. As the 11 seed, they defeated 6 seed Marist in the first round of the MAAC tournament, upset 3 seed Siena in the quarterfinals, before falling to eventual champions Saint Peter's in the semifinals.

== Roster ==
2022–23 Quinnipiac Bobcats men's basketball team
Players
Coaches

Pos.	#	Name	Height	Weight	Year	Hometown
G/F	0	Alexis Reyes	6 ft 7 in (2.01 m)	195 lb (88 kg)	So	Roxbury, Massachusetts
G/F	1	Tymu Chenery	6 ft 6 in (1.98 m)	190 lb (86 kg)	Jr	Philadelphia, Pennsylvania
G	2	Matt Balanc	6 ft 4 in (1.93 m)	195 lb (88 kg)	RS Sr	Silver Spring, Maryland
G	3	Savion Lewis	6 ft 1 in (1.85 m)	175 lb (79 kg)	RS Sr	Dix Hills, New York
G	5	Tyrese Williams	6 ft 3 in (1.91 m)	185 lb (84 kg)	GS	Beacon, New York
G	11	Dezi Jones	5 ft 10 in (1.78 m)	170 lb (77 kg)	Jr	Hannibal, Missouri
G	14	Quinn Guth	6 ft 2 in (1.88 m)	185 lb (84 kg)	So	Brookfield, Connecticut
G	15	Luis Kortright	6 ft 3 in (1.91 m)	200 lb (91 kg)	Jr	Manhattan, New York
F	22	Elijah Taylor	6 ft 8 in (2.03 m)	240 lb (109 kg)	Jr	Philadelphia, Pennsylvania
F	23	JJ Riggins	6 ft 6 in (1.98 m)	245 lb (111 kg)	RS Jr	Philadelphia, Pennsylvania
F	24	Ike Nweke	6 ft 7 in (2.01 m)	245 lb (111 kg)	GS	Woodbine, Maryland
F	33	Paul Otieno	6 ft 8 in (2.03 m)	225 lb (102 kg)	Jr	Nairobi, Kenya

Head coach

- Baker Dunleavy (Villanova)

Assistant coach(es)

- Tom Pecora (Adelphi)
- Shaun Morris (Lycoming)
- Bradley Jacks (Babson)
- Tahar Sutton

Legend

- (C) Team captain
- (S) Suspended
- (I) Ineligible
- (W) Walk-on
- Injured
- Current redshirt

Roster
Last update: October 27, 2022

== Schedule and results ==
Date time, TV	Rank^{#}	Opponent^{#}	Result	Record	Site (attendance) city, state
Regular season
November 7, 2022*; 7:00 pm, ESPN+		at Rhode Island	W 67–62	1–0	Ryan Center (5,501); Kingston, RI
November 10, 2022*; 7:00 pm, NEC Front Row		at Stonehill	W 102–95	2–0	Merkert Gymnasium (1,116); Easton, MA
November 13, 2022*; 1:00 pm, NEC Front Row		at Central Connecticut	W 72–70	3–0	William H. Detrick Gymnasium (1,404); New Britain, CT
November 15, 2022*; 7:00 pm, ESPN+		Dartmouth	W 81–72	4–0	M&T Bank Arena; Hamden, CT
November 18, 2022*; 4:00 pm, ESPN3		Albertus Magnus	W 86–68	5–0	M&T Bank Arena; Hamden, CT
November 25, 2022*; 2:00 pm, BeTheBeast		vs. Stephen F. Austin; Northern Classic	W 58–44	6–0	Place Bell; Laval, Quebec
November 26, 2022*; 7:00 pm, BeTheBeast		vs. Montana State; Northern Classic	W 70–53	7–0	Place Bell; Laval, Quebec
November 27, 2022*; 4:00 pm, BeTheBeast		vs. Hofstra; Northern Classic	L 70–72	7–1	Place Bell; Laval, Quebec
December 4, 2022; 3:00 pm, ESPN+		Niagara	L 60–64	7–2 (0–1)	M&T Bank Arena (747); Hamden, CT
December 7, 2022*; 7:00 pm, ESPN+		at Holy Cross	W 75–71	8–2	Hart Center (1,017); Worcester, MA
December 10, 2022*; 1:00 pm, ESPN3		Lafayette	W 76–63	9–2	M&T Bank Arena (796); Hamden, CT
December 18, 2022; 2:00 pm, ESPN+		at Saint Peter's	L 56–63	9–3 (0–2)	Run Baby Run Arena (267); Jersey City, NJ
December 22, 2022*; 4:30 pm, BTN		at Penn State	L 68–77	9–4	Bryce Jordan Center (3,804); University Park, PA
December 30, 2022; 4:00 pm, ESPN3		Siena	L 76–83	9–5 (0–3)	M&T Bank Arena (2,079); Hamden, CT
January 1, 2023; 4:00 pm, ESPN3		at Manhattan	W 84–65	10–5 (1–3)	Draddy Gymnasium (996); Riverdale, NY
January 6, 2023; 7:00 pm, ESPN+		at Rider	W 72–63	11–5 (2–3)	Alumni Gymnasium (1,216); Lawrenceville, NJ
January 8, 2023; 2:00 pm, ESPN+		Iona	W 81–58	12–5 (3–3)	M&T Bank Arena (1,262); Hamden, CT
January 13, 2023; 7:00 pm, ESPN3		Saint Peter's	W 58–51	13–5 (4–3)	M&T Bank Arena (1,033); Hamden, CT
January 15, 2023; 2:00 pm, ESPN3		at Mount St. Mary's	W 58–51	14–5 (5–3)	Knott Arena (1,492); Emmitsburg, MD
January 22, 2023; 2:00 pm, ESPN+		Canisius	W 87–82	15–5 (6–3)	M&T Bank Arena (1,262); Hamden, CT
January 29, 2023; 1:00 pm, ESPN3		at Iona	L 72–78	15–6 (6–4)	Hynes Athletic Center (2,654); New Rochelle, NY
January 31, 2023; 7:00 pm, ESPN+		Marist	W 72–66	16–6 (7–4)	M&T Bank Arena (612); Hamden, CT
February 3, 2023; 7:00 pm, ESPNU		Fairfield	W 66–51	17–6 (8–4)	M&T Bank Arena (3,519); Hamden, CT
February 5, 2023; 2:00 pm, ESPN+		Mount St. Mary's	L 75–79	17–7 (8–5)	M&T Bank Arena (1,255); Hamden, CT
February 10, 2023; 7:00 pm, ESPN3		at Niagara	L 73–79 ^{OT}	17–8 (8–6)	Gallagher Center (1,270); Lewiston, NY
February 12, 2023; 1:00 pm, ESPN3		at Canisius	L 65–85	17–9 (8–7)	Koessler Athletic Center (561); Buffalo, NY
February 17, 2023; 9:00 pm, ESPNU/ESPN+		at Siena	W 66–63	18–9 (9–7)	MVP Arena (6,315); Albany, NY
February 19, 2023; 2:00 pm, ESPN3		Rider	W 90–88 ^{2OT}	19–9 (10–7)	M&T Bank Arena (1,082); Hamden, CT
February 26, 2023; 2:00 pm, ESPN+		Manhattan	L 70–72	19–10 (10–8)	M&T Bank Arena (1,977); Hamden, CT
March 2, 2023; 7:30 pm, ESPN3		at Fairfield	L 82–92	19–11 (10–9)	Leo D. Mahoney Arena (2,748); Fairfield, CT
March 4, 2023; 7:00 pm, ESPN3		at Marist	W 88–76	20–11 (11–9)	McCann Arena (1,027); Poughkeepsie, NY
MAAC tournament
March 9, 2023; 7:00 pm, ESPN+	(3)	vs. (11) Marist; Quarterfinals	L 59–75	20–12	Jim Whelan Boardwalk Hall; Atlantic City, NJ
*Non-conference game. ^{#}Rankings from AP Poll. (#) Tournament seedings in parentheses. All times are in Eastern.
