= 2022–23 Manhattan Jaspers men's basketball team =

American college basketball season

2022–23 Manhattan Jaspers basketball
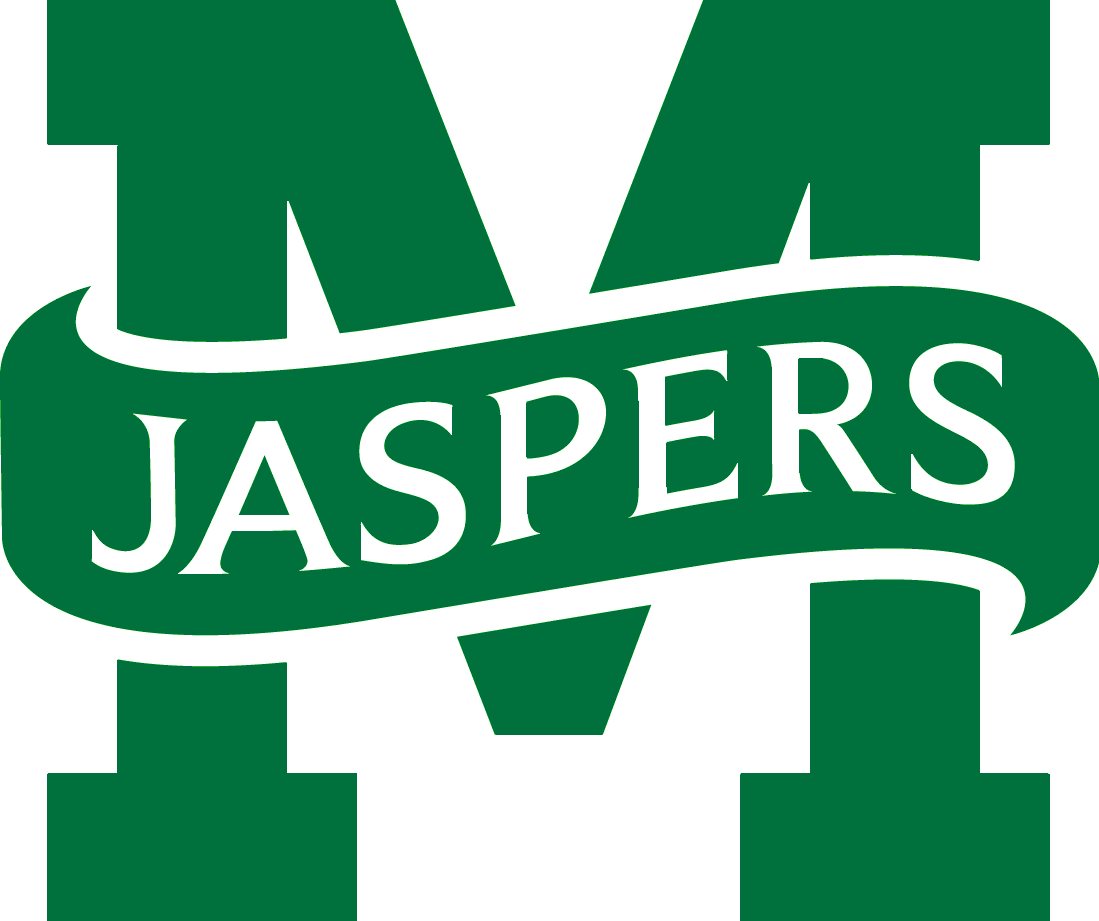
- Conference: Metro Atlantic Athletic Conference
- Record: 12–18 (10–10 MAAC)
- Head coach: RaShawn Stores (interim)
- Assistant coaches: Anthony Doran; Tyler Wilson
- Home arena: Draddy Gymnasium

2022–23 MAAC men's basketball standings
	Conf.				Overall
Team	W		L	PCT	W		L	PCT
Iona †	17	–	3	.850	27	–	8	.771
Rider	13	–	7	.650	16	–	14	.533
Quinnipiac	11	–	9	.550	20	–	12	.625
Siena	11	–	9	.550	17	–	15	.531
Niagara	10	–	10	.500	16	–	15	.516
Manhattan	10	–	10	.500	12	–	18	.400
Fairfield	9	–	11	.450	13	–	18	.419
Mount St. Mary's	8	–	12	.400	13	–	20	.394
Canisius	8	–	12	.400	10	–	20	.333
Saint Peter's	7	–	13	.350	14	–	18	.438
Marist	6	–	14	.300	13	–	20	.394
† 2023 MAAC tournament winner

The 2022–23 Manhattan Jaspers basketball team represented Manhattan College in the 2022–23 NCAA Division I men's basketball season. The Jaspers, led by interim head coach RaShawn Stores, played their home games at Draddy Gymnasium in Riverdale, New York as members of the Metro Atlantic Athletic Conference (MAAC).

== Previous season ==
The Jaspers finished the 2021–22 season 15–15, 8–12 in MAAC play, to finish tied for seventh place. As the 8 seed, they were defeated by 9 seed Rider in the first round of the MAAC tournament.

On October 25, 2022, just two weeks prior to the start of the season, Manhattan announced that head coach Steve Masiello would be leaving the program after 11 years at the helm. Assistant head coach RaShawn Stores, who has spent the last six years as an assistant, was named interim head coach for the upcoming season.

== Roster ==
2022–23 Manhattan Jaspers men's basketball team
Players
Coaches

Pos.	#	Name	Height	Weight	Year	Hometown
F	0	James Jewell	6 ft 6 in (1.98 m)	180 lb (82 kg)	Fr	Louisville, KY
G	1	Matthew Glassman	6 ft 0 in (1.83 m)	175 lb (79 kg)	GS	Bedford, NH
G	2	Tony Jr. Johnson	6 ft 3 in (1.91 m)	185 lb (84 kg)	RS Jr	Eufaula, AL
G	3	Ant Nelson	6 ft 4 in (1.93 m)	180 lb (82 kg)	Sr	New York, NY
G	4	Samir Stewart	6 ft 0 in (1.83 m)	180 lb (82 kg)	Sr	Fort Lauderdale, FL
F	10	Adam Cisse	6 ft 10 in (2.08 m)	220 lb (100 kg)	Sr	The Bronx, NY
F	11	Daniel Schreier	6 ft 9 in (2.06 m)	220 lb (100 kg)	Sr	Santa Monica, CA
G	12	Aryan Arora	6 ft 1 in (1.85 m)	175 lb (79 kg)	So	Tuxedo Park, NY
G	14	Raziel Hayun	6 ft 4 in (1.93 m)	187 lb (85 kg)	Fr	Eilat, Israel
F	21	Adam Walden	6 ft 10 in (2.08 m)	255 lb (116 kg)	Fr	Baltimore, MD
G	22	Daniel Hackett	6 ft 1 in (1.85 m)	175 lb (79 kg)	So	Commack, NY
F	23	Josh Roberts	6 ft 9 in (2.06 m)	220 lb (100 kg)	Sr	Troy, AL
G	24	Marques Watson	6 ft 5 in (1.96 m)	190 lb (86 kg)	Sr	Brooklyn, NY
G	30	Elijah Buchanan	6 ft 5 in (1.96 m)	190 lb (86 kg)	Sr	The Bronx, NY
G/F	34	Logan Padgett	6 ft 6 in (1.98 m)	210 lb (95 kg)	Jr	Homewood, AL
G	55	Nick Brennen	6 ft 5 in (1.96 m)	180 lb (82 kg)	Sr	Irvington, NY

Head coach

- RaShawn Stores (Manhattan)

Assistant coach(es)

- Tyler Wilson (Manhattan)

Legend

- (C) Team captain
- (S) Suspended
- (I) Ineligible
- (W) Walk-on
- Injured
- Current redshirt

Roster
Last update: October 27, 2022

== Schedule and results ==
Date time, TV	Rank^{#}	Opponent^{#}	Result	Record	Site (attendance) city, state
Regular season
November 7, 2022*; 7:00 p.m., ESPN+		at VCU	L 56–73	0–1	Siegel Center (7,344); Richmond, VA
November 13, 2022*; 5:00 p.m., NEC Front Row		at Fairleigh Dickinson	L 74–77	0–2	Rothman Center (336); Hackensack, NJ
November 18, 2022*; 7:00 p.m., ESPN3		Mount Saint Vincent	W 86–39	1–2	Draddy Gymnasium (540); Riverdale, NY
November 24, 2022*; 12:00 p.m.		vs. Northeastern; London Basketball Classic	L 67–69 ^{OT}	1–3	Copper Box Arena (1,551); London, England
November 26, 2022*; 9:30 a.m.		vs. Army; London Basketball Classic	W 72–71	2–3	Copper Box Arena; London, England
December 1, 2022; 7:00 p.m., ESPN+		Fairfield	W 56–53	3–3 (1–0)	Draddy Gymnasium (587); Riverdale, NY
December 4, 2022*; 2:00 p.m., ESPN+		Monmouth	L 69–76	3–4	Draddy Gymnasium (628); Riverdale, NY
December 7, 2022*; 8:30 p.m., FS1		at Providence	L 59–99	3–5	Amica Mutual Pavilion (5,822); Providence, RI
December 11, 2022*; 2:00 p.m., ESPN+		Bryant	L 97–104 ^{OT}	3–6	Draddy Gymnasium; Riverdale, NY
December 16, 2022*; 7:00 p.m., ESPN+		Central Connecticut; Rescheduled from November 11	L 67–78	3–7	Draddy Gymnasium (572); Riverdale, NY
December 19, 2022; 7:00 p.m., ESPN+		at Marist	W 80–69	4–7 (2–0)	McCann Arena (789); Poughkeepsie, NY
December 30, 2022; 2:00 p.m., ESPN+		at Saint Peter's	L 57–67	4–8 (2–1)	Run Baby Run Arena (349); Jersey City, NJ
January 1, 2023; 4:00 p.m., ESPN3		Quinnipiac	L 65–84	4–9 (2–2)	Draddy Gymnasium (996); Riverdale, NY
January 6, 2023; 7:00 p.m., ESPN+		Canisius	L 57–64	4–10 (2–3)	Draddy Gymnasium (284); Riverdale, NY
January 8, 2023; 2:00 p.m., ESPN3		Niagara	W 64–59	5–10 (3–3)	Draddy Gymnasium (789); Riverdale, NY
January 13, 2023; 7:00 p.m., ESPN+		at Mount St. Mary's	W 62–57	6–10 (4–3)	Knott Arena (1,251); Emmitsburg, MD
January 20, 2023; 7:00 p.m., ESPN+		Iona	L 76–84 ^{OT}	6–11 (4–4)	Draddy Gymnasium (2,345); Riverdale, NY
January 22, 2023; 2:00 p.m., ESPN+		at Rider	L 65–67	6–12 (4–5)	Alumni Gymnasium (1,548); Lawrenceville, NJ
January 27, 2023; 7:00 p.m., ESPN+		at Niagara	L 62–68	6–13 (4–6)	Gallagher Center (954); Lewiston, NY
January 29, 2023; 1:00 p.m., ESPN3		at Canisius	W 81–74 ^{OT}	7–13 (5–6)	Koessler Athletic Center (642); Buffalo, NY
February 3, 2023; 7:00 p.m., ESPN3		Siena	W 71–66 ^{OT}	8–13 (6–6)	Draddy Gymnasium (1,137); Riverdale, NY
February 5, 2023; 2:00 p.m., ESPN3		Rider	L 56–67	8–14 (6–7)	Draddy Gymnasium (1,019); Riverdale, NY
February 12, 2023; 2:00 p.m., ESPN3		Saint Peter's	W 68–52	9–14 (7–7)	Draddy Gymnasium (784); Riverdale, NY
February 17, 2023; 7:00 p.m., ESPN3		at Iona	L 60–71	9–15 (7–8)	Hynes Athletic Center (2,514); New Rochelle, NY
February 19, 2023; 2:00 p.m., ESPN3		at Fairfield	W 73–72	10–15 (8–8)	Leo D. Mahoney Arena (2,958); Fairfield, CT
February 24, 2023; 7:00 p.m., ESPN3		Marist	L 58–81	10–16 (8–9)	Draddy Gymnasium (782); Riverdale, NY
February 26, 2023; 2:00 p.m., ESPN+		at Quinnipiac	W 72–70	11–16 (9–9)	M&T Bank Arena (1,977); Hamden, CT
March 2, 2023; 7:00 p.m., ESPN+		at Siena	W 67–66	12–16 (10–9)	MVP Arena (6,706); Albany, NY
March 4, 2023; 2:00 p.m., ESPN3		Mount St. Mary's	L 69–74	12–17 (10–10)	Draddy Gymnasium (1,864); Riverdale, NY
MAAC tournament
March 7, 2023; 9:00 p.m., ESPN+	(6)	vs. (11) Marist; First round	L 50–61	12–18	Jim Whelan Boardwalk Hall (2,167); Atlantic City, NJ
*Non-conference game. ^{#}Rankings from AP poll. (#) Tournament seedings in parentheses. All times are in Eastern.
