= 2022–23 Mount St. Mary's Mountaineers men's basketball team =

American college basketball season

2022–23 Mount St. Mary's Mountaineers men's basketball
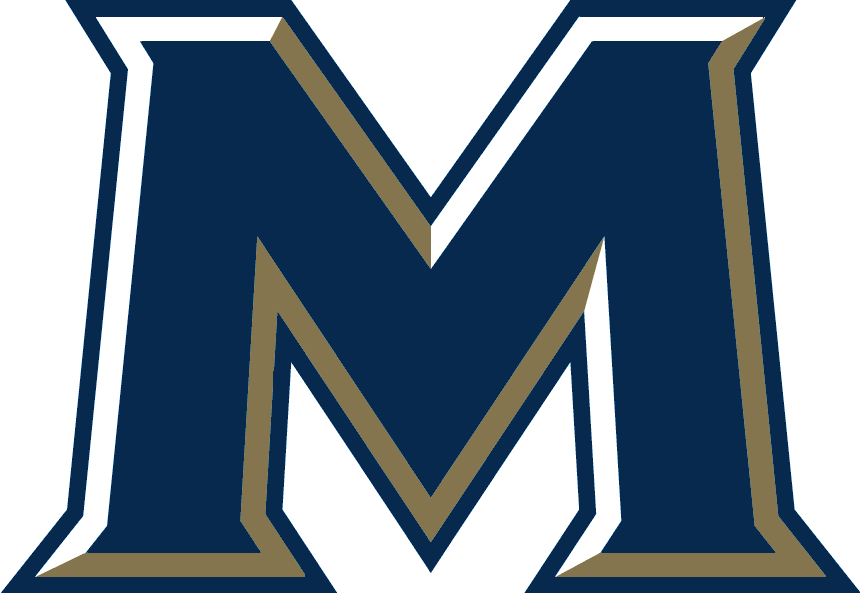
- Conference: Metro Atlantic Athletic Conference
- Record: 13–20 (8–12 MAAC)
- Head coach: Dan Engelstad (5th season)
- Associate head coach: Will Holland
- Assistant coaches: Matt Miller; Justin Burrell
- Home arena: Knott Arena

2022–23 MAAC men's basketball standings
	Conf.				Overall
Team	W		L	PCT	W		L	PCT
Iona †	17	–	3	.850	27	–	8	.771
Rider	13	–	7	.650	16	–	14	.533
Quinnipiac	11	–	9	.550	20	–	12	.625
Siena	11	–	9	.550	17	–	15	.531
Niagara	10	–	10	.500	16	–	15	.516
Manhattan	10	–	10	.500	12	–	18	.400
Fairfield	9	–	11	.450	13	–	18	.419
Mount St. Mary's	8	–	12	.400	13	–	20	.394
Canisius	8	–	12	.400	10	–	20	.333
Saint Peter's	7	–	13	.350	14	–	18	.438
Marist	6	–	14	.300	13	–	20	.394
† 2023 MAAC tournament winner

The 2022–23 Mount St. Mary's Mountaineers men's basketball team represented Mount St. Mary's University in the 2022–23 NCAA Division I men's basketball season. The Mountaineers, led by fifth-year head coach Dan Engelstad, played their home games at Knott Arena in Emmitsburg, Maryland as first-year members of the Metro Atlantic Athletic Conference (MAAC).

The Mountaineers finished the season 13–20, 8–12 in MAAC play, to finish in a tie for ninth place. In the MAAC tournament, they defeated Canisius in the first round before falling to top-seeded and eventual tournament champions Iona in the quarterfinals.

== Previous season ==
The Mountaineers finished the 2021–22 season 14–16, 9–9 in Northeast Conference (NEC) play, to finish in fifth place. In the NEC tournament, they defeated St. Francis Brooklyn in the quarterfinals, before falling to top-seeded and eventual champion Bryant in the semifinals. This was their last season as members of the Northeast Conference, as they moved to the Metro Atlantic Athletic Conference starting in the 2022–23 season.

== Roster ==
2022–23 Mount St. Mary's Mountaineers men's basketball team
Players
Coaches

Pos.	#	Name	Height	Weight	Year	Previous school	Hometown
G	1	Dakota Leffew	6 ft 5 in (1.96 m)	185 lb (84 kg)	Jr	Jonesboro High School	Hampton, GA
G	2	Deandre Thomas	6 ft 5 in (1.96 m)	195 lb (88 kg)	GS	Samford	Inglewood, CA
G	3	Jaylin Gibson	6 ft 4 in (1.93 m)	205 lb (93 kg)	So	Legacy of Sport Sciences	Evanston, IL
F	4	Dola Adebayo	6 ft 8 in (2.03 m)	210 lb (95 kg)	RS Fr	Canterbury School	Fort Myers, FL
G	5	Jalen Benjamin	5 ft 10 in (1.78 m)	160 lb (73 kg)	Sr	Meadowcreek High School	Raleigh, NC
F	10	Cam Crockett	6 ft 6 in (1.98 m)	175 lb (79 kg)	Fr	William B. Travis High School	Houston, TX
F	11	George Tinsley	6 ft 6 in (1.98 m)	210 lb (95 kg)	Sr	Abington Heights High School	Clarks Summit, PA
F	12	Jedy Cordilia	6 ft 9 in (2.06 m)	210 lb (95 kg)	So	West Nottingham Academy	Tilburg, Netherlands
G	13	Justin Gielen	6 ft 0 in (1.83 m)	185 lb (84 kg)	GS	DeMatha Catholic High School	Edgewater, MD
G	15	Amir Dade	6 ft 1 in (1.85 m)	175 lb (79 kg)	Fr	St. Charles High School	Waldorf, MD
G	23	Josh Reaves	6 ft 4 in (1.93 m)	205 lb (93 kg)	Jr	South Kent School	Hamden, CT
F	24	František Barton	6 ft 7 in (2.01 m)	210 lb (95 kg)	Jr	Get Better Academy	Brno, Czech Republic
G	25	Antonio Foxwell	6 ft 5 in (1.96 m)	210 lb (95 kg)	Fr	Calvert Hall High School	Sykesville, MD
G	35	Winston Moore	6 ft 5 in (1.96 m)	210 lb (95 kg)	Jr	St. John's Prep	Frederick, MD
F	42	Malik Jefferson	6 ft 9 in (2.06 m)	230 lb (104 kg)	GS	Hopewell High School	Hopewell, VA
G	45	Xavier Lipscomb	6 ft 2 in (1.88 m)	195 lb (88 kg)	Jr	St. Stephen's & St. Agnes School	Washington, D.C.

Head coach

- Dan Engelstad (St. Mary's (MD))

Assistant coach(es)

- Will Holland (Mount St. Mary's)
- Matt Miller (St. Mary's (MD))
- Justin Burrell (Holy Cross)

Legend

- (C) Team captain
- (S) Suspended
- (I) Ineligible
- (W) Walk-on
- Injured
- Current redshirt

Roster
Last update: December 20, 2022

== Schedule and results ==
Date time, TV	Rank^{#}	Opponent^{#}	Result	Record	Site (attendance) city, state
Regular season
November 7, 2022*; 7:00 p.m., ESPN+		at West Virginia	L 58–76	0–1	WVU Coliseum (9,960); Morgantown, WV
November 11, 2022*; 7:00 p.m.		Coppin State	L 78–83	0–2	Physical Education Complex (612); Baltimore, MD
November 15, 2022*; 7:00 p.m., ESPN+		McDaniel	W 60–38	1–2	Knott Arena (1,990); Emmitsburg, MD
November 18, 2022*; 11:00 p.m., P12N		at USC	L 74–83	1–3	Galen Center (1,590); Los Angeles, CA
November 20, 2022*; 10:00 p.m., ESPN+		at Cal Poly; California Thanksgiving Jam	W 73–68	2–3	Mott Athletics Center (1,057); San Luis Obispo, CA
November 22, 2022*; 10:00 p.m., WCC Network		at Pacific; California Thanksgiving Jam	W 69–65	3–3	Alex G. Spanos Center (944); Stockton, CA
November 26, 2022*; 11:00 a.m., ESPN+		at Navy	L 59–75	3–4	Alumni Hall (793); Annapolis, MD
December 1, 2022; 7:00 p.m., ESPN+		at Saint Peter's	W 73–58	4–4 (1–0)	Run Baby Run Arena (899); Jersey City, NJ
December 3, 2022; 4:00 p.m., ESPN3		Rider	L 65–68	4–5 (1–1)	Knott Arena (1,863); Emmitsburg, MD
December 6, 2022*; 7:00 p.m., ESPN+		American	L 61–69	4–6	Knott Arena (1,577); Emmitsburg, MD
December 10, 2022*; 7:00 p.m., ESPN+		Loyola (MD)	W 51–34	5–6	Knott Arena (2,002); Emmitsburg, MD
December 18, 2022*; 2:00 p.m., ESPN+		Robert Morris	L 59–68	5–7	Knott Arena (1,562); Emmitsburg, MD
December 21, 2022*; 2:00 p.m.		at Howard	L 62–63	5–8	Burr Gymnasium (489); Washington, D.C.
December 30, 2022; 7:00 p.m., ESPN+		at Niagara	L 55–67	5–9 (1–2)	Gallagher Center (981); Lewiston, NY
January 2, 2023; 3:00 p.m., ESPN3		at Canisius	W 64–60	6–9 (2–2)	Koessler Athletic Center (945); Buffalo, NY
January 8, 2023; 2:00 p.m., ESPN3		at Marist	L 56–63	6–10 (2–3)	McCann Arena (609); Poughkeepsie, NY
January 13, 2023; 7:00 p.m., ESPN+		Manhattan	L 57–62	6–11 (2–4)	Knott Arena (1,251); Emmitsburg, MD
January 15, 2023; 2:00 p.m., ESPN3		Quinnipiac	L 51–58	6–12 (2–5)	Knott Arena (1,492); Emmitsburg, MD
January 20, 2023; 7:00 p.m., ESPN+		at Siena	L 57–72	6–13 (2–6)	MVP Arena (5,617); Albany, NY
January 22, 2023; 2:00 p.m., ESPN+		Marist	W 59–55	7–13 (3–6)	Knott Arena (1,606); Emmitsburg, MD
January 26, 2023; 7:00 p.m., ESPN+		Fairfield	L 60–63	7–14 (3–7)	Knott Arena (1,711); Emmitsburg, MD
January 28, 2023; 5:00 p.m., ESPN3		Saint Peter's	L 62–73	7–15 (3–8)	Knott Arena (3,040); Emmitsburg, MD
February 3, 2023; 7:00 p.m., ESPN3		at Iona	L 51–81	7–16 (3–9)	Hynes Athletic Center (2,002); New Rochelle, NY
February 5, 2023; 2:00 p.m., ESPN+		at Quinnipiac	W 79–75	8–16 (4–9)	M&T Bank Arena (1,255); Hamden, CT
February 10, 2023; 7:00 p.m., ESPN+		Siena	L 65–72	8–17 (4–10)	Knott Arena (1,948); Emmitsburg, MD
February 12, 2023; 2:00 p.m., ESPN3		at Fairfield	L 72–76 ^{OT}	8–18 (4–11)	Leo D. Mahoney Arena (1,957); Fairfield, CT
February 17, 2023; 7:00 p.m., ESPN3		Niagara	W 70–66	9–18 (5–11)	Knott Arena (1,506); Emmitsburg, MD
February 19, 2023; 2:00 p.m., ESPN+		Canisius	W 75–74	10–18 (6–11)	Knott Arena (2,316); Emmitsburg, MD
February 24, 2023; 7:00 p.m., ESPN+		Iona	L 68–80	10–19 (6–12)	Knott Arena (3,121); Emmitsburg, MD
February 26, 2023; 2:00 p.m., ESPN+		at Rider	W 63–58	11–19 (7–12)	Alumni Gymnasium (1,650); Lawrenceville, NJ
March 4, 2023; 2:00 p.m., ESPN3		at Manhattan	W 74–69	12–19 (8–12)	Draddy Gymnasium (1,864); Riverdale, NY
MAAC tournament
March 7, 2023; 5:00 p.m., ESPN+	(8)	vs. (9) Canisius; First round	W 67–66 ^{OT}	13–19	Jim Whelan Boardwalk Hall; Atlantic City, NJ
March 8, 2023; 7:00 p.m., ESPN+	(8)	vs. (1) Iona; Quarterfinals	L 54–74	13–20	Jim Whelan Boardwalk Hall; Atlantic City, NJ
*Non-conference game. ^{#}Rankings from AP poll. (#) Tournament seedings in parentheses. All times are in Eastern.
