= 2022–23 Canisius Golden Griffins men's basketball team =

American college basketball season

2022–23 Canisius Golden Griffins men's basketball
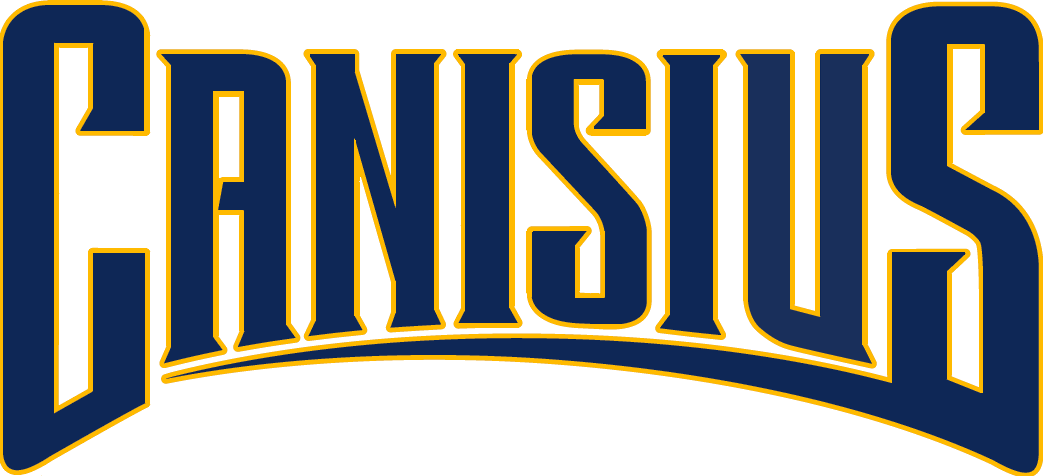
- Conference: Metro Atlantic Athletic Conference
- Record: 10–20 (8–12 MAAC)
- Head coach: Reggie Witherspoon (7th season)
- Assistant coaches: Chris Hawkins; Thurman Schaetzle; Calvin Cage
- Home arena: Koessler Athletic Center

2022–23 MAAC men's basketball standings
	Conf.				Overall
Team	W		L	PCT	W		L	PCT
Iona †	17	–	3	.850	27	–	8	.771
Rider	13	–	7	.650	16	–	14	.533
Quinnipiac	11	–	9	.550	20	–	12	.625
Siena	11	–	9	.550	17	–	15	.531
Niagara	10	–	10	.500	16	–	15	.516
Manhattan	10	–	10	.500	12	–	18	.400
Fairfield	9	–	11	.450	13	–	18	.419
Mount St. Mary's	8	–	12	.400	13	–	20	.394
Canisius	8	–	12	.400	10	–	20	.333
Saint Peter's	7	–	13	.350	14	–	18	.438
Marist	6	–	14	.300	13	–	20	.394
† 2023 MAAC tournament winner

The 2022–23 Canisius Golden Griffins men's basketball team represented Canisius College in the 2022–23 NCAA Division I men's basketball season. The Golden Griffins, led by seventh-year head coach Reggie Witherspoon, played their home games at the Koessler Athletic Center in Buffalo, New York as members of the Metro Atlantic Athletic Conference.

== Previous season ==
The Golden Griffins finished the 2021–22 season 11–21, 7–13 in MAAC play to finish tied for last place. As the No. 10 seed, they were defeated by Fairfield in the first round of the MAAC tournament.

== Roster ==
2022–23 Canisius Golden Griffins men's basketball team
Players
Coaches

Pos.	#	Name	Height	Weight	Year	Hometown
G	0	Tre Dinkins	6 ft 2 in (1.88 m)	190 lb (86 kg)	So	Chester, Pennsylvania
G	1	Devean Williams	6 ft 3 in (1.91 m)	180 lb (82 kg)	Fr	Los Angeles, California
G	2	Jamir Moultrie	6 ft 1 in (1.85 m)	172 lb (78 kg)	GS	Wilmington, Delaware
G	3	Jordan Henderson	6 ft 5 in (1.96 m)	190 lb (86 kg)	GS	Cincinnati, Ohio
F	4	Youri Fritz	6 ft 9 in (2.06 m)	190 lb (86 kg)	Fr	Tiel, Netherlands
G	5	Siem Uijtendaal	6 ft 6 in (1.98 m)	185 lb (84 kg)	Jr	Haarlem, Netherlands
F	10	Jacco Fritz	6 ft 10 in (2.08 m)	215 lb (98 kg)	Sr	Tiel, Netherlands
G	11	Michael DiGiulio	6 ft 0 in (1.83 m)	170 lb (77 kg)	So	Williamsville, New York
F	12	Bryce Okpoh	6 ft 7 in (2.01 m)	190 lb (86 kg)	Jr	Dallas, Texas
G	21	TJ Gadsden	6 ft 7 in (2.01 m)	195 lb (88 kg)	So	New York, New York
F	22	George Maslennikov	6 ft 10 in (2.08 m)	240 lb (109 kg)	GS	Odesa, Ukraine
F	23	Frank Mitchell	6 ft 8 in (2.03 m)	240 lb (109 kg)	So	Toronto, Ontario
G	25	Xzavier Long	6 ft 7 in (2.01 m)	190 lb (86 kg)	So	Washington, D.C.
G	44	Tahj Staveskie	6 ft 0 in (1.83 m)	165 lb (75 kg)	RS Fr	Sandusky, Ohio

Head coach

- Reggie Witherspoon (Wheeling)

Assistant coach(es)

- Chris Hawkins (Radford)
- Thurman Schaetzle (Canisius)
- Calvin Cage (Buffalo)

Legend

- (C) Team captain
- (S) Suspended
- (I) Ineligible
- (W) Walk-on
- Injured
- Current redshirt

Roster
Last update: November 1, 2022

== Schedule and results ==
Date time, TV	Rank^{#}	Opponent^{#}	Result	Record	Site (attendance) city, state
Regular season
November 7, 2022*; 7:30 pm, ESPN3		Youngstown State	L 81–92	0–1	Koessler Athletic Center (1,391); Buffalo, NY
November 12, 2022*; 7:00 pm, ESPN+		St. Bonaventure	W 84–80 ^{OT}	1–1	Koessler Athletic Center (1,903); Buffalo, NY
November 16, 2022*; 7:00 pm, ESPN+		Cleveland State	L 57–58 ^{OT}	1–2	Koessler Athletic Center (766); Buffalo, NY
November 18, 2022*; 7:00 pm, ESPN3		Fredonia	W 98–52	2–2	Koessler Athletic Center (449); Buffalo, NY
November 22, 2022*; 5:00 pm, ESPN+		at Cornell	L 70–79	2–3	Newman Arena (447); Ithaca, NY
November 27, 2022*; 2:30 pm, ESPN+		at Buffalo	L 66–86	2–4	Alumni Arena (1,922); Amherst, NY
December 2, 2022; 7:00 pm, ESPN+		at Siena	L 70–74	2–5 (0–1)	MVP Arena (5,409); Albany, NY
December 4, 2022; 1:00 pm, ESPN+		at Iona	L 60–90	2–6 (0–2)	Hynes Athletic Center (1,633); New Rochelle, NY
December 10, 2022*; 2:00 pm, ESPN3		at Toledo	L 68–69	2–7	Savage Arena (4,320); Toledo, OH
December 18, 2022*; 12:00 pm, BTN		at Penn State	L 67–97	2–8	Bryce Jordan Center (4,342); University Park, PA
December 21, 2022*; 7:00 pm, ESPN+		at Florida Gulf Coast	L 81–84	2–9	Alico Arena (4,633); Fort Myers, FL
December 30, 2022; 7:00 pm, ESPN3		Rider	L 64–66	2–10 (0–3)	Koessler Athletic Center (2,400); Buffalo, NY
January 1, 2023; 1:00 pm, ESPN3		Mount St. Mary's	L 60–64	2–11 (0–4)	Koessler Athletic Center (2,400); Buffalo, NY
January 6, 2023; 7:00 pm, ESPN+		at Manhattan	W 64–57	3–11 (1–4)	Draddy Gymnasium (284); Riverdale, NY
January 8, 2023; 2:00 pm, ESPN+		at Saint Peter's	W 67–60 ^{OT}	4–11 (2–4)	Run Baby Run Arena (541); Jersey City, NJ
January 13, 2023; 7:00 pm, ESPN3		Marist	L 58–76	4–12 (2–5)	Koessler Athletic Center (588); Buffalo, NY
January 15, 2023; 1:00 pm, ESPN3		Siena	W 66–62	5–12 (3–5)	Koessler Athletic Center (499); Buffalo, NY
January 20, 2023; 7:00 pm, ESPN+		at Fairfield	L 58–67	5–13 (3–6)	Leo D. Mahoney Arena (3,219); Fairfield, CT
January 22, 2023; 2:00 pm, ESPN+		at Quinnipiac	L 82–87	5–14 (3–7)	M&T Bank Arena; Hamden, CT
January 29, 2023; 1:00 pm, ESPN3		Manhattan	L 74–81 ^{OT}	5–15 (3–8)	Koessler Athletic Center (642); Buffalo, NY
February 3, 2023; 8:00 pm, ESPN+		at Niagara; Battle of the Bridge	L 73–76	5–16 (3–9)	Gallagher Center (1,564); Lewiston, NY
February 5, 2023; 2:00 pm, ESPN+		at Marist	L 67–75	5–17 (3–10)	McCann Arena (1,193); Poughkeepsie, NY
February 10, 2023; 7:00 pm, ESPN3		Iona	L 59–80	5–18 (3–11)	Koessler Athletic Center (857); Buffalo, NY
February 12, 2023; 1:00 pm, ESPN3		Quinnipiac	W 85–65	6–18 (4–11)	Koessler Athletic Center (561); Buffalo, NY
February 17, 2023; 7:00 pm, ESPN+		at Rider	W 81–78	7–18 (5–11)	Alumni Gymnasium (1,650); Lawrenceville, NJ
February 19, 2023; 2:00 pm, ESPN+		at Mount St. Mary's	L 74–75	7–19 (5–12)	Knott Arena (2,316); Emmitsburg, MD
February 24, 2023; 7:00 pm, ESPN3		Saint Peter's	W 66–53	8–19 (6–12)	Koessler Athletic Center (702); Buffalo, NY
February 26, 2023; 1:00 pm, ESPN3		Fairfield	W 64–51	9–19 (7–12)	Koessler Athletic Center (696); Buffalo, NY
March 4, 2023; 3:30 pm, ESPN3		Niagara; Battle of the Bridge	W 81–68	10–19 (8–12)	Koessler Athletic Center (1,150); Buffalo, NY
MAAC tournament
March 7, 2023; 5:00 pm, ESPN+	(9)	vs. (8) Mount St. Mary's; First round	L 66–67 ^{OT}	10–20	Jim Whelan Boardwalk Hall; Atlantic City, NJ
*Non-conference game. ^{#}Rankings from AP Poll. (#) Tournament seedings in parentheses. All times are in Eastern.
