= 2022–23 Rider Broncs men's basketball team =

American college basketball season

2022–23 Rider Broncs men's basketball
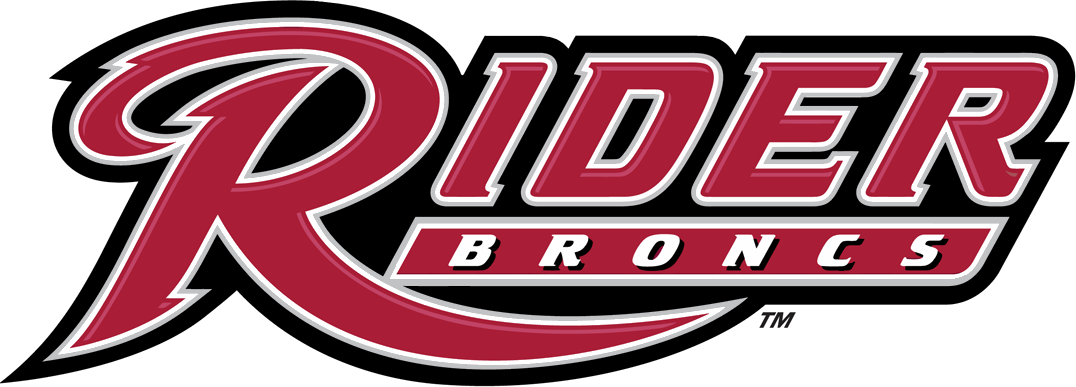
- Conference: Metro Atlantic Athletic Conference
- Record: 16–14 (13–7 MAAC)
- Head coach: Kevin Baggett (11th season)
- Associate head coach: Dino Presley
- Assistant coaches: Geoff Arnold; Kim Waiters; Jason Thompson
- Home arena: Alumni Gymnasium

2022–23 MAAC men's basketball standings
	Conf.				Overall
Team	W		L	PCT	W		L	PCT
Iona †	17	–	3	.850	27	–	8	.771
Rider	13	–	7	.650	16	–	14	.533
Quinnipiac	11	–	9	.550	20	–	12	.625
Siena	11	–	9	.550	17	–	15	.531
Niagara	10	–	10	.500	16	–	15	.516
Manhattan	10	–	10	.500	12	–	18	.400
Fairfield	9	–	11	.450	13	–	18	.419
Mount St. Mary's	8	–	12	.400	13	–	20	.394
Canisius	8	–	12	.400	10	–	20	.333
Saint Peter's	7	–	13	.350	14	–	18	.438
Marist	6	–	14	.300	13	–	20	.394
† 2023 MAAC tournament winner

The 2022–23 Rider Broncs men's basketball team represented Rider University in the 2022–23 NCAA Division I men's basketball season. The Broncs, led by 11th-year head coach Kevin Baggett, played their home games at the Alumni Gymnasium in Lawrenceville, New Jersey as members of the Metro Atlantic Athletic Conference.

== Previous season ==
The Broncs finished the 2021–22 season 14–19, 8–12 in MAAC play to finish in a tie for seventh place. In the MAAC tournament, they defeated Manhattan in the first round, upset top-seeded Iona in the quarterfinals, before falling to Monmouth in the semifinals.

== Roster ==
2022–23 Rider Broncs men's basketball team
Players
Coaches

Pos.	#	Name	Height	Weight	Year	Previous school	Hometown
G	0	Adetokunbo Bakare	6 ft 3 in (1.91 m)	190 lb (86 kg)	So	NJIT	Newark, NJ
G	2	Allen Powell	6 ft 2 in (1.88 m)	175 lb (79 kg)	Sr	La Salle College High School	Philadelphia, PA
G	3	Corey McKeithan	6 ft 2 in (1.88 m)	175 lb (79 kg)	Jr	Windsor High School	Windsor, CT
F	5	Mervin James	6 ft 7 in (2.01 m)	215 lb (98 kg)	Sr	North Alabama	St. Thomas, USVI
G	10	Drew Kousaie	6 ft 0 in (1.83 m)	174 lb (79 kg)	Fr	Windermere Prep	Kissimmee, FL
F	11	Tyrel Bladen	6 ft 10 in (2.08 m)	235 lb (107 kg)	RS Sr	Coatesville High School	Coatesville, PA
G	12	Zahrion Blue	6 ft 4 in (1.93 m)	200 lb (91 kg)	GS	Lincoln	Princeton, NJ
F	13	Ajiri Ogemuno-Johnson	6 ft 8 in (2.03 m)	210 lb (95 kg)	GS	Monsignor Bonner High School	Delta State, Nigeria
G	15	Allen Betrand	6 ft 5 in (1.96 m)	200 lb (91 kg)	Sr	Rhode Island	Philadelphia, PA
G	22	Jack McFadden	6 ft 4 in (1.93 m)	185 lb (84 kg)	Fr	Maine-Endwell High School	Endwell, NY
G/F	23	Anthony McCall	6 ft 4 in (1.93 m)	191 lb (87 kg)	Fr	Academy of the New Church	Philadelphia, PA
G	24	Kami Young	6 ft 2 in (1.88 m)	185 lb (84 kg)	Fr	Pebblebrook High School	Kennesaw, GA
G	25	Nix Varano	6 ft 2 in (1.88 m)	175 lb (79 kg)	Fr	La Salle College High School	Chalfont, PA
F	33	Tariq Ingraham	6 ft 9 in (2.06 m)	255 lb (116 kg)	Jr	Wake Forest	Philadelphia, PA
F	35	Nehemiah Benson	6 ft 7 in (2.01 m)	215 lb (98 kg)	Jr	Lutheran East High School	Streetsboro, OH
G	55	Dwight Murray Jr.	6 ft 0 in (1.83 m)	180 lb (82 kg)	Sr	Incarnate Word	Austell, GA

Head coach

- Kevin Baggett (Saint Joseph's)

Assistant coach(es)

- Dino Presley (Kutztown)
- Geoff Arnold (Saint Joseph's)
- Kim Waiters (Robert Morris)
- Jason Thompson (Rider)

Legend

- (C) Team captain
- (S) Suspended
- (I) Ineligible
- (W) Walk-on
- Injured
- Current redshirt

Roster
Last update: December 13, 2022

== Schedule and results ==
Date time, TV	Rank^{#}	Opponent^{#}	Result	Record	Site (attendance) city, state
Exhibition
October 29, 2022*; 3:00 pm		Cabrini	W 111–79	–	Alumni Gymnasium (1,650); Lawrenceville, NJ
Regular season
November 8, 2022*; 6:30 pm, FS1		at Providence	L 65–66	0–1	Amica Mutual Pavilion (11,018); Providence, RI
November 12, 2022*; 4:00 pm, ESPN3		TCNJ	W 87–50	1–1	Alumni Gymnasium (1,525); Lawrenceville, NJ
November 18, 2022*; 5:00 am, ESPN+		vs. Stetson; MAAC/ASUN Dublin Challenge	L 68–78	1–2	National Basketball Arena; Dublin, Ireland
November 19, 2022*; 6:00 am, ESPN+		vs. Central Arkansas; MAAC/ASUN Dublin Challenge	L 85–90	1–3	National Basketball Arena; Dublin, Ireland
November 22, 2022*; 7:00 pm, BTN		at Rutgers	L 46–76	1–4	Jersey Mike's Arena (8,000); Piscataway, NJ
November 30, 2022*; 8:00 pm, ESPN+		Monmouth	W 88–62	2–4	Alumni Gymnasium (1,650); Lawrenceville, NJ
December 3, 2022; 4:00 pm, ESPN3		at Mount St. Mary's	W 68–65	3–4 (1–0)	Knott Arena (1,863); Emmitsburg, MD
December 7, 2022*; 7:00 pm		at Stonehill	W 78–67	4–4	Merkert Gymnasium (150); Easton, MA
December 19, 2022*; 7:00 pm, ESPN+		Delaware	L 59–60	4–5	Alumni Gymnasium (1,650); Lawrenceville, NJ
December 22, 2022; 7:00 pm, ESPN+		Marist	W 77–71	5–5 (2–0)	Alumni Gymnasium (1,065); Lawrenceville, NJ
December 28, 2022*; 7:00 pm, SECN+		at Georgia	L 72–78	5–6	Stegeman Coliseum (10,523); Athens, GA
December 30, 2022; 7:00 pm, ESPN3		at Canisius	W 66–64	6–6 (3–0)	Koessler Athletic Center (981); Buffalo, NY
January 2, 2023; 12:00 pm, ESPN3		at Niagara	L 59–61	6–7 (3–1)	Gallagher Center (945); Lewiston, NY
January 6, 2023; 7:00 pm, ESPN+		Quinnipiac	L 63–72	6–8 (3–2)	Alumni Gymnasium (1,216); Lawrenceville, NJ
January 8, 2023; 2:00 pm, ESPN+		at Siena	L 63–68	6–9 (3–3)	MVP Arena (5,909); Albany, NY
January 15, 2023; 1:00 pm, ESPN3		at Iona	W 70–67	7–9 (4–3)	Hynes Athletic Center (1,828); New Rochelle, NY
January 20, 2023; 7:00 pm, ESPN+		Niagara	W 65–62	8–9 (5–3)	Alumni Gymnasium (1,322); Lawrenceville, NJ
January 22, 2023; 2:00 pm, ESPN+		Manhattan	W 67–65	9–9 (6–3)	Alumni Gymnasium (1,548); Lawrenceville, NJ
January 27, 2023; 7:00 pm, ESPNU/ESPN3		at Marist	W 68–52	10–9 (7–3)	McCann Arena; Poughkeepsie, NY
January 29, 2023; 2:00 pm, ESPN3		at Fairfield	W 78–69 ^{OT}	11–9 (8–3)	Leo D. Mahoney Arena (2,388); Fairfield, CT
February 3, 2023; 7:00 pm, ESPNU/ESPN3		Saint Peter's	W 82–61	12–9 (9–3)	Alumni Gymnasium (1,650); Lawrenceville, NJ
February 5, 2023; 2:00 pm, ESPN3		at Manhattan	W 67–56	13–9 (10–3)	Draddy Gymnasium (1,019); Riverdale, NY
February 10, 2023; 7:00 pm, ESPNU/ESPN+		Fairfield	W 58–57	14–9 (11–3)	Alumni Gymnasium (1,650); Lawrenceville, NJ
February 17, 2023; 7:00 pm, ESPNU/ESPN+		Canisius	L 78–81	14–10 (11–4)	Alumni Gymnasium (1,650); Lawrenceville, NJ
February 19, 2023; 2:00 pm, ESPN3		at Quinnipiac	L 88–90 ^{2OT}	14–11 (11–5)	M&T Bank Arena (1,082); Hamden, CT
February 24, 2023; 7:00 pm, ESPNU		Siena	W 69–66	15–11 (12–5)	Alumni Gymnasium (1,650); Lawrenceville, NJ
February 26, 2023; 2:00 pm, ESPN+		Mount St. Mary's	L 58–63	15–12 (12–6)	Alumni Gymnasium (1,650); Lawrenceville, NJ
March 2, 2023; 7:00 pm, ESPN+		at Saint Peter's	W 73–60	16–12 (13–6)	Run Baby Run Arena (573); Jersey City, NJ
March 4, 2023; 7:00 pm, ESPN+		Iona	L 78–80	16–13 (13–7)	Alumni Gymnasium (1,650); Lawrenceville, NJ
MAAC tournament
March 8, 2023; 9:30 pm, ESPN+	(2)	vs. (10) Saint Peter's; Quarterfinals	L 62–70	16–14	Jim Whelan Boardwalk Hall; Atlantic City, NJ
*Non-conference game. ^{#}Rankings from AP Poll. (#) Tournament seedings in parentheses. All times are in Eastern.
