= 2022–23 Iona Gaels men's basketball team =

American college basketball season

2022–23 Iona Gaels men's basketball
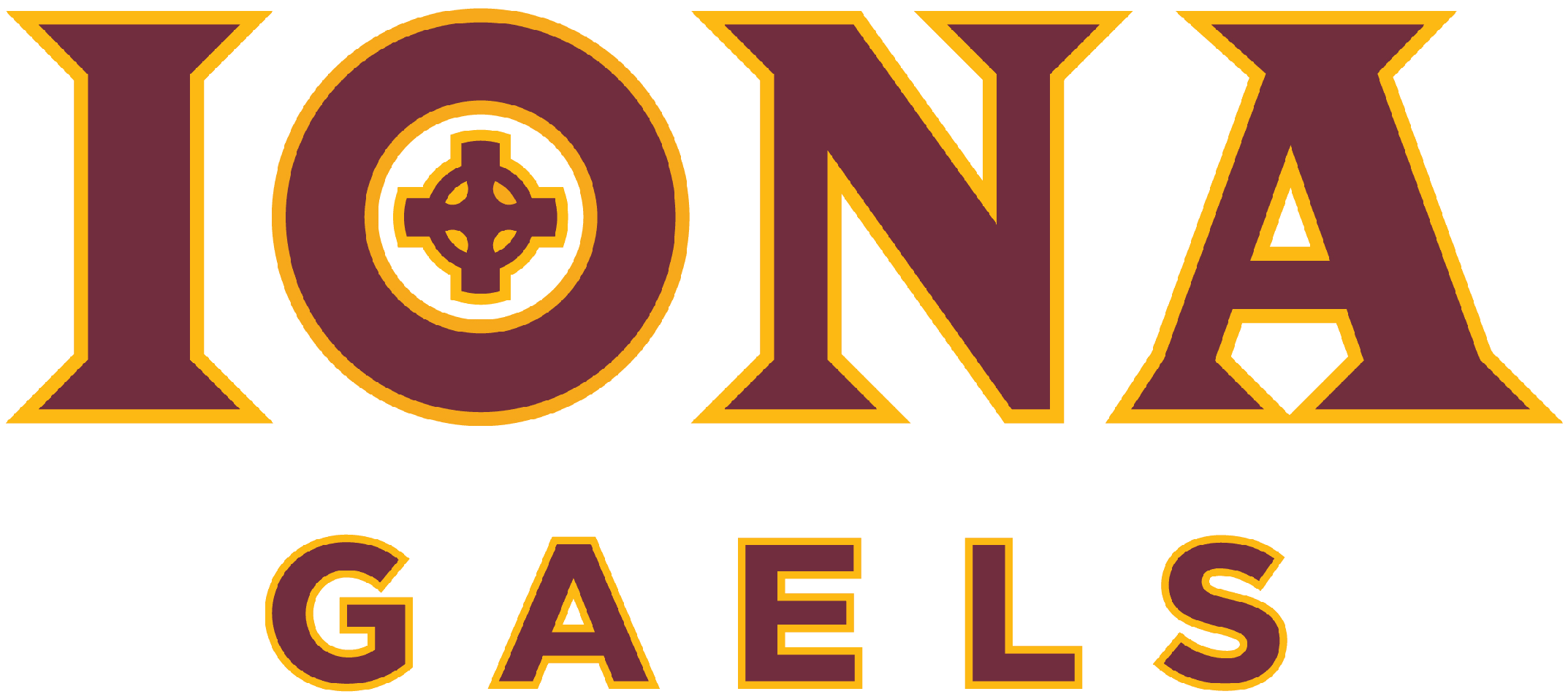

MAAC regular season and tournament champions

NCAA tournament, First Round
- Conference: Metro Atlantic Athletic Conference
- Record: 27–8 (17–3 MAAC)
- Head coach: Rick Pitino (3rd season)
- Assistant coaches: Ricky Johns; Taliek Brown; Bob Walsh
- Home arena: Hynes Athletic Center

2022–23 MAAC men's basketball standings
	Conf.				Overall
Team	W		L	PCT	W		L	PCT
Iona †	17	–	3	.850	27	–	8	.771
Rider	13	–	7	.650	16	–	14	.533
Quinnipiac	11	–	9	.550	20	–	12	.625
Siena	11	–	9	.550	17	–	15	.531
Niagara	10	–	10	.500	16	–	15	.516
Manhattan	10	–	10	.500	12	–	18	.400
Fairfield	9	–	11	.450	13	–	18	.419
Mount St. Mary's	8	–	12	.400	13	–	20	.394
Canisius	8	–	12	.400	10	–	20	.333
Saint Peter's	7	–	13	.350	14	–	18	.438
Marist	6	–	14	.300	13	–	20	.394
† 2023 MAAC tournament winner

The 2022–23 Iona Gaels men's basketball team represented Iona University in the 2022–23 NCAA Division I men's basketball season. The Gaels, led by third-year head coach Rick Pitino, played their home games at the Hynes Athletic Center in New Rochelle, New York as members of the Metro Atlantic Athletic Conference. They finished the season 27–8, 17–3 in MAAC play to win the regular season championship. In the MAAC tournament, they defeated Mount St. Mary's, Niagara, and Marist to win the tournament championship. As a result, they received the conference's automatic bid to the NCAA tournament as the No. 13 seed in the West region. There they lost in the first round to eventual champion UConn.

In March 2023, head coach Rick Pitino left the team to accept the head coaching job at St. John's. The next day, the school named Fairleigh Dickinson head coach Tobin Anderson the team's new head coach.

== Previous season ==
The Gaels finished the 2021–22 season 25–8, 17–3 in MAAC play to finish as MAAC regular season champions. As the top seed in the MAAC tournament, they were upset in the quarterfinals by #9 seed Rider. As a conference regular season champion who failed to win their conference tournament, they received an automatic bid to the NIT, where they lost in the first round to Florida.

== Roster ==
2022–23 Iona Gaels men's basketball team
Players
Coaches

Pos.	#	Name	Height	Weight	Year	Hometown
G	0	Berrick JeanLouis	6 ft 4 in (1.93 m)	200 lb (91 kg)	Sr	Lehigh Acres, Florida
G	1	Walter Clayton Jr.	6 ft 2 in (1.88 m)	195 lb (88 kg)	So	Lake Wales, Florida
F	2	Sadiku Ibine Ayo	6 ft 7 in (2.01 m)	210 lb (95 kg)	Fr	Asabi-Kumasi, Ghana
G	3	Cruz Davis	6 ft 3 in (1.91 m)	170 lb (77 kg)	Fr	Plano, Texas
G	4	Parker Weiss	6 ft 2 in (1.88 m)	175 lb (79 kg)	Sr	Naples, Florida
G	5	Daniss Jenkins	6 ft 3 in (1.91 m)	175 lb (79 kg)	Jr	Dallas, Texas
F	11	Quinn Slazinski	6 ft 9 in (2.06 m)	215 lb (98 kg)	Sr	Houston, Texas
G	12	Anton Brookshire	6 ft 1 in (1.85 m)	175 lb (79 kg)	So	Springfield, Missouri
F	13	Nelly Junior Joseph	6 ft 9 in (2.06 m)	240 lb (109 kg)	Jr	Benin City, Nigeria
G/F	23	Michael Jefferson	6 ft 7 in (2.01 m)	210 lb (95 kg)	So	Sulphur Springs, Texas
F	24	Keither Florence	6 ft 7 in (2.01 m)	210 lb (95 kg)	Fr	Wichita, Kansas
F	33	Silas Sunday	7 ft 0 in (2.13 m)	290 lb (132 kg)	Fr	Lucan, Ireland
G	44	James Carey	5 ft 10 in (1.78 m)	160 lb (73 kg)	Sr	Pelham, New York
F	55	Osborn Shema	7 ft 0 in (2.13 m)	220 lb (100 kg)	Sr	Kanombe, Rwanda

Head coach

- Rick Pitino (UMass)

Assistant coach(es)

- Ricky Johns (Monroe)
- Taliek Brown (Connecticut)
- Bob Walsh (Hamilton)

Legend

- (C) Team captain
- (S) Suspended
- (I) Ineligible
- (W) Walk-on
- Injured
- Current redshirt

Roster
Last update: December 11, 2022

== Schedule and results ==
Date time, TV	Rank^{#}	Opponent^{#}	Result	Record	Site (attendance) city, state
Regular season
November 7, 2022*; 7:00 pm, ESPN+		Penn	W 78–50	1–0	Hynes Athletic Center (2,654); New Rochelle, NY
November 11, 2022*; 7:00 pm, FloHoops		at Hofstra	L 78–83	1–1	Mack Sports Complex (3,707); Hempstead, NY
November 18, 2022*; 7:30 pm, ESPN+		vs. Vermont; Basketball Hall of Fame Showcase	W 71–50	2–1	Mohegan Sun Arena; Uncasville, CT
November 27, 2022*; 12:00 am, BeTheBeast		vs. Santa Clara; Las Vegas Holiday Classic	L 76–86	2–2	Orleans Arena; Paradise, NV
December 2, 2022; 7:00 pm, ESPN3		Niagara	W 78–56	3–2 (1–0)	Hynes Athletic Center (2,087); New Rochelle, NY
December 4, 2022; 1:00 pm, ESPN+		Canisius	W 90–60	4–2 (2–0)	Hynes Athletic Center (1,633); New Rochelle, NY
December 6, 2022*; 7:00 pm, ESPN+		Saint Louis	W 84–62	5–2	Hynes Athletic Center (2,171); New Rochelle, NY
December 11, 2022*; 11:30 am, YES		vs. St. Bonaventure; Basketball Hall of Fame Invitational	W 72–57	6–2	Barclays Center; Brooklyn, NY
December 13, 2022*; 7:00 pm, SNY/ESPN+		vs. Princeton	W 70–64	7–2	Harwood Arena (496); Union, NJ
December 18, 2022*; 6:30 pm, FS1		at New Mexico	L 74–82	7–3	The Pit (14,354); Albuquerque, NM
December 22, 2022*; 3:00 pm, ESPNU		vs. SMU; Diamond Head Classic first round	L 81–85	7–4	Stan Sheriff Center; Honolulu, HI
December 23, 2022*; 4:30 pm, ESPNU		vs. Seattle; Diamond Head Classic	W 83–72	8–4	Stan Sheriff Center; Honolulu, HI
December 25, 2022*; 3:30 pm, ESPN2		vs. Pepperdine; Diamond Head Classic	W 76-66	9–4	Stan Sheriff Center (3,897); Honolulu, HI
January 1, 2023; 4:00 pm, ESPN3		Saint Peter's	W 73–55	10–4 (3–0)	Hynes Athletic Center (2,273); New Rochelle, NY
January 6, 2023; 7:00 pm, ESPN+		at Marist	W 84–57	11–4 (4–0)	McCann Arena (1,234); Poughkeepsie, NY
January 8, 2023; 2:00 pm, ESPN+		at Quinnipiac	L 58–81	11–5 (4–1)	M&T Bank Arena (1,262); Hamden, CT
January 13, 2023; 7:00 pm, ESPN+		Fairfield	W 75–69	12–5 (5–1)	Hynes Athletic Center (2,654); New Rochelle, NY
January 15, 2023; 1:00 pm, ESPN3		Rider	L 67–70	12–6 (5–2)	Hynes Athletic Center (1,828); New Rochelle, NY
January 20, 2023; 7:00 pm, ESPN+		at Manhattan	W 84–76 ^{OT}	13–6 (6–2)	Draddy Gymnasium (2,345); Riverdale, NY
January 27, 2023; 7:00 pm, ESPNU/ESPN+		at Siena	L 53–70	13–7 (6–3)	MVP Arena (7,801); Albany, NY
January 29, 2023; 1:00 pm, ESPN3		Quinnipiac	W 78–72	14–7 (7–3)	Hynes Athletic Center (2,654); New Rochelle, NY
February 3, 2023; 7:00 pm, ESPNU/ESPN3		Mount St. Mary's	W 81–51	15–7 (8–3)	Hynes Athletic Center (2,002); New Rochelle, NY
February 5, 2023; 2:00 pm, ESPN3		at Fairfield	W 70–61	16–7 (9–3)	Leo D. Mahoney Arena (3,605); Fairfield, CT
February 10, 2023; 7:00 pm, ESPNU/ESPN3		at Canisius	W 80–59	17–7 (10–3)	Koessler Athletic Center (857); Buffalo, NY
February 12, 2023; 1:00 pm, ESPN+		at Niagara	W 72–55	18–7 (11–3)	Gallagher Center (1,102); Lewiston, NY
February 17, 2023; 7:00 pm, ESPNU/ESPN3		Manhattan	W 71–60	19–7 (12–3)	Hynes Athletic Center (2,514); New Rochelle, NY
February 19, 2023; 2:00 pm, ESPN+		at Saint Peter's	W 73–53	20–7 (13–3)	Run Baby Run Arena (672); Jersey City, NJ
February 24, 2023; 7:00 pm, ESPN+		at Mount St. Mary's	W 80–68	21–7 (14–3)	Knott Arena (3,121); Emmitsburg, MD
February 26, 2023; 1:00 pm, ESPN3		Siena	W 93–60	22–7 (15–3)	Hynes Athletic Center (2,644); New Rochelle, NY
March 2, 2023; 7:00 pm, ESPN3		Marist	W 93–74	23–7 (16–3)	Hynes Athletic Center (2,455); New Rochelle, NY
March 4, 2023; 7:00 pm, ESPN+		at Rider	W 80–78	24–7 (17–3)	Alumni Gymnasium (1,650); Lawrenceville, NJ
MAAC tournament
March 8, 2023; 7:00 pm, ESPN+	(1)	vs. (8) Mount St. Mary's; Quarterfinals	W 74–54	25–7	Jim Whelan Boardwalk Hall; Atlantic City, NJ
March 10, 2023; 6:00 pm, ESPNews	(1)	vs. (5) Niagara; Semifinals	W 71–59	26–7	Jim Whelan Boardwalk Hall; Atlantic City, NJ
March 11, 2023; 7:30 pm, ESPNU	(1)	vs. (11) Marist; Championship	W 76–55	27–7	Jim Whelan Boardwalk Hall (3,892); Atlantic City, NJ
NCAA tournament
March 17, 2023*; 4:30 pm, TBS	(13 W)	vs. (4 W) No. 10 UConn; First Round	L 63–87	27–8	MVP Arena (14,010); Albany, NY
*Non-conference game. ^{#}Rankings from AP Poll. (#) Tournament seedings in parentheses. All times are in Eastern.
