= 2022–23 Marist Red Foxes men's basketball team =

American college basketball season

2022–23 Marist Red Foxes men's basketball
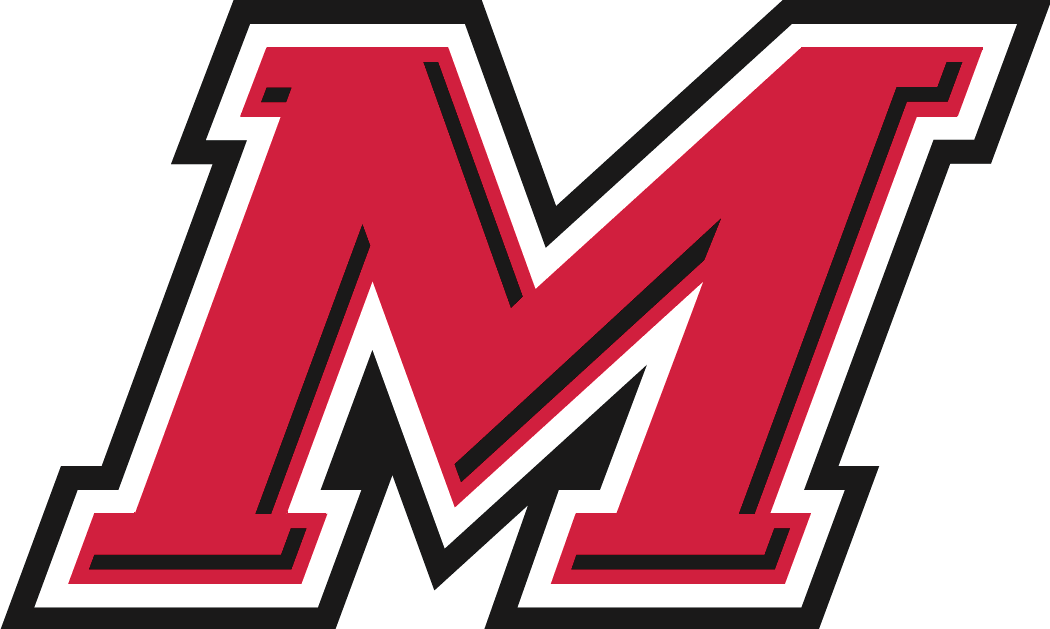
- Conference: Metro Atlantic Athletic Conference
- Record: 13–20 (6–14 MAAC)
- Head coach: John Dunne (5th season)
- Assistant coaches: Dalip Bhatia; Dorian Long; Drew Metz
- Home arena: McCann Arena

2022–23 MAAC men's basketball standings
| | Conf. | | | | Overall |
| Team | W | | L | PCT | W | | L | PCT |
|---|---|---|---|---|---|---|---|---|
| Iona † | 17 | – | 3 | .850 | 27 | – | 8 | .771 |
| Rider | 13 | – | 7 | .650 | 16 | – | 14 | .533 |
| Quinnipiac | 11 | – | 9 | .550 | 20 | – | 12 | .625 |
| Siena | 11 | – | 9 | .550 | 17 | – | 15 | .531 |
| Niagara | 10 | – | 10 | .500 | 16 | – | 15 | .516 |
| Manhattan | 10 | – | 10 | .500 | 12 | – | 18 | .400 |
| Fairfield | 9 | – | 11 | .450 | 13 | – | 18 | .419 |
| Mount St. Mary's | 8 | – | 12 | .400 | 13 | – | 20 | .394 |
| Canisius | 8 | – | 12 | .400 | 10 | – | 20 | .333 |
| Saint Peter's | 7 | – | 13 | .350 | 14 | – | 18 | .438 |
| Marist | 6 | – | 14 | .300 | 13 | – | 20 | .394 |
† 2023 MAAC tournament winner

The 2022–23 Marist Red Foxes men's basketball team represented Marist College in the 2022–23 NCAA Division I men's basketball season. The Red Foxes, led by fifth-year head coach John Dunne, played their home games at the McCann Arena in Poughkeepsie, New York as members of the Metro Atlantic Athletic Conference.

== Previous season ==
The Red Foxes finished the 2021–22 season 14–16, 9–11 in MAAC play to finish in a tie for fifth place. They were upset by Quinnipiac in the first round of the MAAC tournament.

== Roster ==
2022–23 Marist Red Foxes men's basketball team
Players
Coaches

| Pos. | # | Name | Height | Weight | Year | Hometown |
|---|---|---|---|---|---|---|
| C | 0 | Stephane Ingo | 6 ft 9 in (2.06 m) | 210 lb (95 kg) | GS | Mississauga, Ontario |
| C | 1 | Rollin Belton | 6 ft 8 in (2.03 m) | 235 lb (107 kg) | So | Jonesboro, Louisiana |
| G | 2 | Noah Harris | 6 ft 1 in (1.85 m) | 180 lb (82 kg) | So | Manalapan, New Jersey |
| G | 4 | Anthony Cooper | 6 ft 2 in (1.88 m) | 170 lb (77 kg) | GS | Ashburn, Virginia |
| G/F | 5 | Isaiah Brickner | 6 ft 4 in (1.93 m) | 190 lb (86 kg) | Fr | San Diego, California |
| F | 10 | Trace Salton | 6 ft 5 in (1.96 m) | 195 lb (88 kg) | Fr | Lake Oswego, Oregon |
| F | 11 | Jaden Daughtry | 6 ft 6 in (1.98 m) | 195 lb (88 kg) | Fr | Fresh Meadows, New York |
| C | 15 | Patrick Gardner | 6 ft 11 in (2.11 m) | 245 lb (111 kg) | GS | Merrick, New York |
| F | 20 | Matt McCool | 6 ft 8 in (2.03 m) | 230 lb (104 kg) | Fr | Amherst, New Hampshire |
| F | 21 | Tyler Saint-Furcy | 6 ft 4 in (1.93 m) | 190 lb (86 kg) | Sr | Inwood, New York |
| F | 23 | Javon Cooley | 6 ft 5 in (1.96 m) | 205 lb (93 kg) | Jr | Chicago, Illinois |
| G | 24 | Kam Farris | 6 ft 3 in (1.91 m) | 175 lb (79 kg) | Jr | Burlington, Vermont |
| F | 31 | Thomas Botticelli | 6 ft 4 in (1.93 m) | 180 lb (82 kg) | So | Commack, New York |
| F | 32 | Mack Wall | 6 ft 7 in (2.01 m) | 210 lb (95 kg) | Fr | Portland, Oregon |

Head coach

- John Dunne (Ithaca)

Assistant coach(es)

- Dalip Bhatia (Rutgers)
- Dorian Long (Neumann)
- Drew Metz (St. John's)

Legend

- (C) Team captain
- (S) Suspended
- (I) Ineligible
- (W) Walk-on
- Injured
- Current redshirt

Roster
Last update: November 30, 2022

== Schedule and results ==
| Date time, TV | Rank^{#} | Opponent^{#} | Result | Record | High points | High rebounds | High assists | Site (attendance) city, state |
Non-conference regular season
| November 9, 2022*; 7:00 pm, ESPN+ | | American | W 73–69 | 1–0 | 20 – Farris | 10 – Cooley | 4 – 2 Tied | McCann Arena (1,155); Poughkeepsie, NY |
| November 12, 2022*; 7:00 pm, ESPN3 | | Binghamton | L 75–78 | 1–1 | 24 – Gardner | 13 – Gardner | 3 – Farris | McCann Arena (1,096); Poughkeepsie, NY |
| November 16, 2022*; 7:00 pm, ESPN+ | | at Lehigh | L 54–64 | 1–2 | 16 – Cooper | 7 – 2 Tied | 3 – 2 Tied | Stabler Arena (568); Bethlehem, PA |
| November 19, 2022*; 7:00 pm, ESPN3 | | Princeton | L 55–62 | 1–3 | 15 – Gardner | 8 – Cooley | 4 – Harris | McCann Arena (823); Poughkeepsie, NY |
| November 22, 2022*; 8:00 pm | | at Maryland Eastern Shore | L 59–70 | 1–4 | 20 – Gardner | 7 – Gardner | 3 – 2 Tied | Hytche Athletic Center (598); Princess Anne, MD |
| November 26, 2022*; 2:00 pm, ESPN+ | | at Bucknell | W 60–54 ^{OT} | 2–4 | 16 – Gardner | 12 – Ingo | 4 – Brickner | Sojka Pavilion (747); Lewisburg, PA |
| November 28, 2022*; 7:00 pm, ESPN+ | | Columbia | W 52–39 | 3–4 | 13 – Cooley | 8 – Cooley | 5 – Brickner | McCann Arena (861); Poughkeepsie, NY |
| December 4, 2022*; 10:30 am, ESPNU | | vs. Maine; Basketball Hall of Fame London Showcase | W 62–61 | 4–4 | 27 – Gardner | 9 – Gardner | 5 – Brickner | The O_{2} Arena; London, England |
| December 10, 2022*; 7:00 pm, ESPN3 | | Boston University | L 70–72 | 4–5 | 23 – Harris | 9 – Gardner | 6 – Gardner | McCann Arena (991); Poughkeepsie, NY |
MAAC regular season
| December 19, 2022; 7:00 pm, ESPN+ | | Manhattan | L 69–80 | 4–6 (0–1) | 14 – Harris | 12 – Indo | 5 – Gardner | McCann Arena (789); Poughkeepsie, NY |
| December 22, 2022; 7:00 pm, ESPN+ | | at Rider | L 71–77 | 4–7 (0-2) | 21 – Gardner | 12 – Ingo | 4 – Gardner | Alumni Gymnasium (1,065); Lawrenceville, NJ |
| December 30, 2022; 7:00 pm, ESPN3 | | at Fairfield | L 54–76 | 4–8 (0-3) | 15 – Brickner | 11 – Ingo | 3 – Brickner | Leo D. Mahoney Arena (1,802); Fairfield, CT |
| January 6, 2023; 7:00 pm, ESPN+ | | Iona | L 57–84 | 4–9 (0–4) | 16 – Gardner | 4 – 3 Tied | 3 – Gadner | McCann Arena (1,234); Poughkeepsie, NY |
| January 8, 2023; 2:00 pm, ESPN3 | | Mount St. Mary's | W 63–56 | 5–9 (1–4) | 23 – Gardner | 6 – 2 Tied | 3 – 2 Tied | McCann Arena (609); Poughkeepsie, NY |
| January 13, 2023; 7:00 pm, ESPN3 | | at Canisius | W 76–58 | 6–9 (2–4) | 26 – Gardner | 6 – Daughtry | 8 – Brickner | Koessler Athletic Center (588); Buffalo, NY |
| January 15, 2023; 1:00 pm, ESPN+ | | at Niagara | W 66–64 | 7–9 (3–4) | 31 – Gardner | 5 – Brickner | 2 – 4 Tied | Gallagher Center (711); Lewiston, NY |
| January 20, 2023; 7:00 pm, ESPN3 | | Saint Peter's | L 57–61 | 7–10 (3–5) | 15 – 2 Tied | 6 – 2 Tied | 3 – Gardner | McCann Arena (673); Poughkeepsie, NY |
| January 22, 2023; 2:00 pm, ESPN+ | | at Mount St. Mary's | L 55–59 | 7–11 (3–6) | 17 – Gardner | 7 – Daughtry | 2 – Brickner | Knott Arena (1,606); Emmitsburg, MD |
| January 27, 2023; 7:00 pm, ESPN3 | | Rider | L 52–68 | 7–12 (3–7) | 15 – Gardner | 7 – Salton | 4 – Brickner | McCann Arena (1,387); Poughkeepsie, NY |
| January 29, 2023; 2:00 pm, ESPN3 | | Siena | L 55–70 | 7–13 (3–8) | 18 – Gardner | 7 – Gardner | 3 – Harris | McCann Arena (1,738); Poughkeepsie, NY |
| January 31, 2023; 7:00 pm, ESPN+ | | at Quinnipiac | L 66–72 | 7–14 (3–9) | 17 – Gardner | 10 – Daughtry | 5 – Gardner | M&T Bank Arena (612); Hamden, CT |
| February 5, 2023; 2:00 pm, ESPN+ | | Canisius | W 75–67 | 8–14 (4–9) | 29 – Gardner | 9 – Gardner | 3 – Tied | McCann Arena (1,193); Poughkeepsie, NY |
| February 10, 2023; 7:00 pm, ESPN+ | | at Saint Peter's | L 56–67 | 8–15 (4–10) | 17 – Gardner | 9 – Gardner | 5 – Gardner | Run Baby Run Arena (758); Jersey City, NJ |
| February 12, 2023; 2:00 pm, ESPN+ | | at Siena | L 65–73 | 8–16 (4–11) | 25 – Gardner | 10 – Gardner | 1 – Tied | MVP Arena (6,012); Albany, NY |
| February 17, 2023; 7:00 pm, ESPN+ | | Fairfield | L 61–70 | 8–17 (4–12) | 13 – Gardner | 7 – Daughtry | 4 – Harris | McCann Arena (926); Poughkeepsie, NY |
| February 19, 2023; 2:00 pm, ESPN3 | | Niagara | W 61–52 | 9–17 (5–12) | 14 – Tied | 6 – Tied | 2 – Tied | McCann Arena (1,051); Poughkeepsie, NY |
| February 24, 2023; 7:00 pm, ESPN3 | | at Manhattan | W 81–58 | 10–17 (6–12) | 25 – Gardner | 11 – Ingo | 5 – Brickner | Draddy Gymnasium (782); Riverdale, NY |
| March 2, 2023; 7:00 pm, ESPN3 | | at Iona | L 74–93 | 10–18 (6–13) | 17 – Farris | 7 – Daughtry | 6 – Harris | Hynes Athletic Center (2,455); New Rochelle, NY |
| March 4, 2023; 7:00 pm, ESPN3 | | Quinnipiac | L 76–88 | 10–19 (6–14) | 27 – Gardner | 9 – Gardner | 7 – Harris | McCann Arena (1,027); Poughkeepsie, NY |
MAAC tournament
| March 7, 2023; 9:00 pm, ESPN+ | (11) | vs. (6) Manhattan; First round | W 61–50 | 11–19 | 22 – Gardner | 11 – Gardner | 3 – Brickner | Jim Whelan Boardwalk Hall (2,167); Atlantic City, NJ |
| March 9, 2023; 7:00 pm, ESPN+ | (11) | vs. (3) Quinnipiac; Quarterfinals | W 75–59 | 12–19 | 22 – Gardner | 9 – Tied | 6 – Brickner | Jim Whelan Boardwalk Hall; Atlantic City, NJ |
| March 10, 2023; 8:30 pm, ESPNEWS | (11) | vs. (10) Saint Peter's; Semifinals | W 69–57 | 13–19 | 18 – Gardner | 11 – Gardner | 3 – Harris | Jim Whelan Boardwalk Hall (2,430); Atlantic City, NJ |
| March 11, 2023; 7:30 pm, ESPNU | (11) | vs. (1) Iona; Championship | L 55–76 | 13–20 | 23 – Gardner | 7 – Gardner | 2 – Tied | Jim Whelan Boardwalk Hall (3,892); Atlantic City, NJ |
*Non-conference game. ^{#}Rankings from AP Poll. (#) Tournament seedings in parentheses. All times are in Eastern.
