= 2022–23 Niagara Purple Eagles men's basketball team =

American college basketball season

2022–23 Niagara Purple Eagles men's basketball
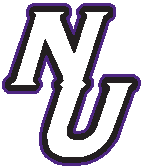
- Conference: Metro Atlantic Athletic Conference
- Record: 16–15 (10–10 MAAC)
- Head coach: Greg Paulus (4th season)
- Assistant coaches: Kevin Devitt; Antone Gray; Tyler Kelly
- Home arena: Gallagher Center

2022–23 MAAC men's basketball standings
	Conf.				Overall
Team	W		L	PCT	W		L	PCT
Iona †	17	–	3	.850	27	–	8	.771
Rider	13	–	7	.650	16	–	14	.533
Quinnipiac	11	–	9	.550	20	–	12	.625
Siena	11	–	9	.550	17	–	15	.531
Niagara	10	–	10	.500	16	–	15	.516
Manhattan	10	–	10	.500	12	–	18	.400
Fairfield	9	–	11	.450	13	–	18	.419
Mount St. Mary's	8	–	12	.400	13	–	20	.394
Canisius	8	–	12	.400	10	–	20	.333
Saint Peter's	7	–	13	.350	14	–	18	.438
Marist	6	–	14	.300	13	–	20	.394
† 2023 MAAC tournament winner

The 2022–23 Niagara Purple Eagles men's basketball team represented Niagara University in the 2022–23 NCAA Division I men's basketball season. The Purple Eagles, led by fourth-year head coach Greg Paulus, played their home games at the Gallagher Center in Lewiston, New York as members of the Metro Atlantic Athletic Conference (MAAC).

The Purple Eagles finished the season 16–15, 10–10 in MAAC play, to finish in a tie for fifth place. They defeated Siena in the quarterfinals of the MAAC tournament, before falling to top-seeded and eventual champions Iona in the quarterfinals.

== Previous season ==
The Purple Eagles finished the 2021–22 season 14–16, 9–11 in MAAC play, to finish tied for fifth place. As the No. 5 seed, they were defeated by No. 4 seed Monmouth in the quarterfinals of the MAAC tournament.

== Roster ==
2022–23 Niagara Purple Eagles men's basketball team
Players
Coaches

Pos.	#	Name	Height	Weight	Year	Hometown
G	0	Shane Lancaster	6 ft 4 in (1.93 m)	195 lb (88 kg)	Fr	Bowie, MD
G	1	Bryce Moore	6 ft 4 in (1.93 m)	176 lb (80 kg)	Fr	Round Lake, IL
G	2	Lance Erving	6 ft 3 in (1.91 m)	190 lb (86 kg)	Jr	Leesburg, FL
G	4	Braxton Bayless	6 ft 2 in (1.88 m)	185 lb (84 kg)	Jr	Ankeny, IA
F	5	Keith III Kiner	6 ft 6 in (1.98 m)	195 lb (88 kg)	Jr	Sparta, IL
G	10	Jalen Brown	5 ft 10 in (1.78 m)	160 lb (73 kg)	Fr	Chicago, IL
F	11	Aaron Gray	6 ft 7 in (2.01 m)	215 lb (98 kg)	So	Providence, RI
F	13	Touba Traore	6 ft 11 in (2.11 m)	210 lb (95 kg)	Jr	Bamako, Mali
G	14	David Mitchell	6 ft 6 in (1.98 m)	210 lb (95 kg)	GS	Roxbury, MA
G	21	Noah Thomasson	6 ft 3 in (1.91 m)	195 lb (88 kg)	Sr	Houston, TX
F	22	Sam Iorio	6 ft 7 in (2.01 m)	230 lb (104 kg)	GS	Allentown, PA
G	25	Joe Kasperzyk	6 ft 3 in (1.91 m)	190 lb (86 kg)	Sr	New Haven, CT
F	30	Donovan Hill	6 ft 8 in (2.03 m)	210 lb (95 kg)	Fr	Harrisburg, PA
F	55	Harlan Obioha	7 ft 0 in (2.13 m)	280 lb (127 kg)	Fr	Hoxie, KS

Head coach

- Greg Paulus (Duke)

Assistant coach(es)

- Kevin Devitt (DePaul)
- Antone Gray (Rhode Island College)
- Tyler Kelly (Florida Southern)

Legend

- (C) Team captain
- (S) Suspended
- (I) Ineligible
- (W) Walk-on
- Injured
- Current redshirt

Roster
Last update: November 2, 2022

== Schedule and results ==
Date time, TV	Rank^{#}	Opponent^{#}	Result	Record	Site (attendance) city, state
Exhibition
November 1, 2022*; 7:00 p.m., ESPN+		Roberts Wesleyan	W 72–63	–	Gallagher Center (900); Lewiston, NY
Regular season
November 7, 2022*; 7:00 p.m., BTN+		at Maryland	L 49–71	0–1	Xfinity Center (10,715); College Park, MD
November 12, 2022*; 5:00 p.m., ESPN+		at Bucknell	L 50–68	0–2	Sojka Pavilion (1,264); Lewisburg, PA
November 18, 2022*; 11:00 a.m., ESPN+		vs. Central Arkansas; MAAC/ASUN Dublin Basketball Challenge	W 73–64	1–2	National Basketball Arena; Dublin, Ireland
November 19, 2022*; 12:00 p.m., ESPN+		vs. Stetson; MAAC/ASUN Dublin Basketball Challenge	W 66–62	2–2	National Basketball Arena; Dublin, Ireland
November 23, 2022*; 3:00 p.m., ESPN+		D'Youville	W 91–53	3–2	Gallagher Center (751); Lewiston, NY
November 26, 2022*; 2:00 p.m., FS2		at St. John's	L 70–78	3–3	Carnesecca Arena (3,437); Queens, NY
December 2, 2022; 7:00 p.m., ESPN+		at Iona	L 56–78	3–4 (0–1)	Hynes Athletic Center (2,057); New Rochelle, NY
December 4, 2022; 4:00 p.m., ESPN+		at Quinnipiac	W 64–60	4–4 (1–1)	M&T Bank Arena (747); Hamden, CT
December 11, 2022*; 1:00 p.m., ESPN+		Eastern Michigan	W 67–60	5–4	Gallagher Center (897); Lewiston, NY
December 18, 2022*; 2:00 p.m., ESPN+		at NJIT	L 53–62	5–5	Wellness and Events Center (229); Newark, NJ
December 21, 2022*; 7:00 p.m., ESPN+		Binghamton	W 73–67	6–5	Gallagher Center (757); Lewiston, NY
December 30, 2022; 7:00 p.m., ESPN+		Mount St. Mary's	W 67–55	7–5 (2–1)	Gallagher Center (981); Lewiston, NY
January 1, 2023; 1:00 p.m., ESPN3		Rider	W 61–59	8–5 (3–1)	Gallagher Center; Lewiston, NY
January 6, 2023; 7:00 p.m., ESPN3		at Fairfield	W 77–69 ^{OT}	9–5 (4–1)	Leo D. Mahoney Arena (1,885); Fairfield, CT
January 8, 2023; 2:00 p.m., ESPN3		at Manhattan	L 59–64	9–6 (4–2)	Draddy Gymnasium (789); Riverdale, NY
January 13, 2023; 7:00 p.m., ESPN3		Siena	L 64–70	9–7 (4–3)	Gallagher Center (1,017); Lewiston, NY
January 15, 2023; 1:00 p.m., ESPN+		Marist	L 64–66	9–8 (4–4)	Gallagher Center (711); Lewiston, NY
January 20, 2023; 7:00 p.m., ESPN+		at Rider	L 62–65	9–9 (4–5)	Alumni Gymnasium (1,322); Lawrenceville, NJ
January 22, 2023; 2:00 p.m., ESPN+		at Saint Peter's	W 59–57	10–9 (5–5)	Run Baby Run Arena (563); Jersey City, NJ
January 27, 2023; 7:00 p.m., ESPN+		Manhattan	W 68–62	11–9 (6–5)	Gallagher Center (954); Lewiston, NY
February 3, 2023; 8:00 p.m., ESPN+		Canisius; Battle of the Bridge	W 76–73	12–9 (7–5)	Gallagher Center (1,564); Lewiston, NY
February 5, 2023; 2:00 p.m., ESPN+		at Siena	W 56–54	13–9 (8–5)	MVP Arena (7,121); Albany, NY
February 10, 2023; 7:00 p.m., ESPN3		Quinnipiac	W 79–73 ^{OT}	14–9 (9–5)	Gallagher Center (1,270); Lewiston, NY
February 12, 2023; 1:00 p.m., ESPN+		Iona	L 55–72	14–10 (9–6)	Gallagher Center (1,102); Lewiston, NY
February 17, 2023; 7:00 p.m., ESPN3		at Mount St. Mary's	L 66–70	14–11 (9–7)	Knott Arena (1,506); Emmitsburg, MD
February 19, 2023; 2:00 p.m., ESPN3		at Marist	L 52–61	14–12 (9–8)	McCann Arena (1,051); Poughkeepsie, NY
February 24, 2023; 7:00 p.m., ESPN+		Fairfield	W 76–68	15–12 (10–8)	Gallagher Center (1,321); Lewiston, NY
February 26, 2023; 1:00 p.m., ESPN3		Saint Peter's	L 65–66	15–13 (10–9)	Gallagher Center (1,109); Lewiston, NY
March 4, 2023; 3:30 p.m., ESPN3		at Canisius; Battle of the Bridge	L 68–81	15–14 (10–10)	Koessler Athletic Center (1,150); Buffalo, NY
MAAC tournament
March 9, 2023; 9:30 p.m., ESPN+	(5)	vs. (4) Siena; Quarterfinals	W 71–65	16–14	Jim Whelan Boardwalk Hall (1,954); Atlantic City, NJ
March 10, 2023; 6:00 p.m., ESPNEWS	(5)	vs. (1) Iona; Semifinals	L 59–71	16–15	Jim Whelan Boardwalk Hall; Atlantic City, NJ
*Non-conference game. ^{#}Rankings from AP poll. (#) Tournament seedings in parentheses. All times are in Eastern.
