= 2022–23 Siena Saints men's basketball team =

American college basketball season

2022–23 Siena Saints men's basketball
- Conference: Metro Atlantic Athletic Conference
- Record: 17–15 (11–9 MAAC)
- Head coach: Carmen Maciariello (4th season)
- Assistant coaches: Bobby Castagna; Greg Fahey; Darius Theus
- Home arena: MVP Arena

2022–23 MAAC men's basketball standings
	Conf.				Overall
Team	W		L	PCT	W		L	PCT
Iona †	17	–	3	.850	27	–	8	.771
Rider	13	–	7	.650	16	–	14	.533
Quinnipiac	11	–	9	.550	20	–	12	.625
Siena	11	–	9	.550	17	–	15	.531
Niagara	10	–	10	.500	16	–	15	.516
Manhattan	10	–	10	.500	12	–	18	.400
Fairfield	9	–	11	.450	13	–	18	.419
Mount St. Mary's	8	–	12	.400	13	–	20	.394
Canisius	8	–	12	.400	10	–	20	.333
Saint Peter's	7	–	13	.350	14	–	18	.438
Marist	6	–	14	.300	13	–	20	.394
† 2023 MAAC tournament winner

The 2022–23 Siena Saints men's basketball team represented Siena College in the 2022–23 NCAA Division I men's basketball season. The Saints, led by fourth-year head coach Carmen Maciariello, played their home games at MVP Arena in Albany, New York as members of the Metro Atlantic Athletic Conference.

== Previous season ==
The Saints finished the 2021–22 season 15–14, 12–8 in MAAC play to finish in third place. As the No. 3 seed, they were upset by No. 11 seed Quinnipiac in the quarterfinals of the MAAC tournament.

== Roster ==
2022–23 Siena Saints men's basketball team
Players
Coaches

Pos.	#	Name	Height	Weight	Year	Hometown
G	0	Zek Tekin	6 ft 2 in (1.88 m)	168 lb (76 kg)	Fr	Istanbul, Turkey
G	1	Jared Billups	6 ft 4 in (1.93 m)	200 lb (91 kg)	So	Waldorf, Maryland
G	2	Javian McCollum	6 ft 2 in (1.88 m)	155 lb (70 kg)	So	Fort Myers, Florida
G	3	Michael Eley	6 ft 4 in (1.93 m)	188 lb (85 kg)	Fr	Fort Wayne, Indiana
G	5	Jayce Johnson	6 ft 5 in (1.96 m)	215 lb (98 kg)	Sr	Buffalo, New York
F	12	Sveinn Birgisson	6 ft 8 in (2.03 m)	195 lb (88 kg)	Fr	Reykjavík, Iceland
G	13	Aidan Dagostino	6 ft 1 in (1.85 m)	151 lb (68 kg)	So	Saratoga Springs, New York
F	14	Jordan Kellier	6 ft 7 in (2.01 m)	232 lb (105 kg)	Sr	Portmore, Jamaica
G	15	Mason Courtney	6 ft 4 in (1.93 m)	175 lb (79 kg)	Fr	Clifton Park, New York
F	20	Killian Gribben	6 ft 10 in (2.08 m)	208 lb (94 kg)	Fr	Letterkenny, Ireland
F	21	Brendan Coyle	6 ft 7 in (2.01 m)	205 lb (93 kg)	Fr	Niskayuna, New York
G	22	Andrew Platek	6 ft 4 in (1.93 m)	208 lb (94 kg)	GS	Guilderland, New York
G	23	Taihland Owens	6 ft 6 in (1.98 m)	188 lb (85 kg)	So	Canton, Georgia
F	24	Michael Baer	6 ft 7 in (2.01 m)	218 lb (99 kg)	GS	Bettendorf, Iowa
C	32	Eduardo Lane	6 ft 10 in (2.08 m)	249 lb (113 kg)	Sr	Aquidauana, Brazil
F	33	Steven Lazar	6 ft 6 in (1.98 m)	173 lb (78 kg)	Jr	Toronto, Ontario
F	55	Jackson Stormo	6 ft 9 in (2.06 m)	249 lb (113 kg)	GS	Santa Barbara, California

Head coach

- Carmen Maciariello (Siena)

Assistant coach(es)

- Bobby Castagna (Cal State Northridge)
- Greg Fahey (Marist)
- Darius Theus (VCU)

Legend

- (C) Team captain
- (S) Suspended
- (I) Ineligible
- (W) Walk-on
- Injured
- Current redshirt

Roster
Last update: November 9, 2022

== Schedule and results ==
Date time, TV	Rank^{#}	Opponent^{#}	Result	Record	Site (attendance) city, state
Regular season
November 7, 2022*; 7:00 pm, ESPN+		at Holy Cross	W 75–68	1–0	Hart Center (1,681); Worcester, MA
November 12, 2022*; 7:30 pm, ESPN3		Albany; Rivalry	W 75–62	2–0	MVP Arena (9,561); Albany, NY
November 16, 2022*; 7:00 pm, ESPN+		Army	L 94–96 ^{OT}	2–1	MVP Arena (5,213); Albany, NY
November 20, 2022*; 2:00 pm, ESPN+		at Harvard	L 59–69	2–2	Lavietes Pavilion (1,142); Cambridge, MA
November 24, 2022*; 11:00 am, ESPN2		vs. Florida State; ESPN Events Invitational First Round	W 80–63	3–2	State Farm Field House; Lake Buena Vista, FL
November 25, 2022*; 11:00 am, ESPN2		vs. Ole Miss; ESPN Events Invitational Semifinals	L 62–74	3–3	State Farm Field House; Lake Buena Vista, FL
November 27, 2022*; 5:00 pm, ESPN2		vs. Seton Hall; ESPN Events Invitational 3rd Place Game	W 60–55	4–3	State Farm Field House; Lake Buena Vista, FL
December 2, 2022; 7:00 pm, ESPN+		Canisius	W 74–70	5–3 (1–0)	MVP Arena (5,409); Albany, NY
December 7, 2022*; 6:30 pm, FS2		at Georgetown	L 68–75	5–4	Capital One Arena (3,526); Washington, D.C.
December 11, 2022*; 2:00 pm, FloHoops		at Delaware	L 64–75	5–5	Bob Carpenter Center (1,554); Newark, DE
December 19, 2022*; 7:00 pm, ESPN+		St. Bonaventure; Br. Ed Coughlin Franciscan Cup	W 76–70	6–5	MVP Arena (5,616); Albany, NY
December 22, 2022*; 1:00 pm, ESPN+		at American	W 64–61	7–5	Bender Arena (612); Washington, D.C.
December 30, 2022; 4:00 pm, ESPN3		at Quinnipiac	W 83–76	8–5 (2–0)	M&T Bank Arena (2,079); Hamden, CT
January 1, 2023; 2:00 pm, ESPN3		at Fairfield	W 70–61	9–5 (3–0)	Leo D. Mahoney Arena (2,224); Fairfield, CT
January 6, 2023; 7:00 pm, ESPN+		Saint Peter's	W 70–60	10–5 (4–0)	MVP Arena (5,703); Albany, NY
January 8, 2023; 2:00 pm, ESPN+		Rider	W 68–63	11–5 (5–0)	MVP Arena (5,909); Albany, NY
January 13, 2023; 7:00 pm, ESPN3		at Niagara	W 70–64	12–5 (6–0)	Gallagher Center (1,017); Lewiston, NY
January 15, 2023; 12:00 pm, ESPN3		at Canisius	L 62–66	12–6 (6–1)	Koessler Athletic Center (499); Buffalo, NY
January 20, 2023; 7:00 pm, ESPN+		Mount St. Mary's	W 72–57	13–6 (7–1)	MVP Arena (5,617); Albany, NY
January 22, 2023; 2:00 pm, ESPN+		Fairfield	L 52–62	13–7 (7–2)	MVP Arena (6,410); Albany, NY
January 27, 2023; 7:00 pm, ESPNU		Iona	W 70–53	14–7 (8–2)	MVP Arena (7,801); Albany, NY
January 29, 2023; 2:00 pm, ESPN3		at Marist	W 70–55	15–7 (9–2)	McCann Arena (1,738); Poughkeepsie, NY
February 3, 2023; 7:00 pm, ESPN3		at Manhattan	L 66–71 ^{OT}	15–8 (9–3)	Draddy Gymnasium (1,137); Riverdale, NY
February 5, 2023; 2:00 pm, ESPN+		Niagara	L 54–56	15–9 (9–4)	MVP Arena (7,121); Albany, NY
February 10, 2023; 7:00 pm, ESPN3		at Mount St. Mary's	W 72–65	16–9 (10–4)	Knott Arena (1,948); Emmitsburg, MD
February 12, 2023; 2:00 pm, ESPN+		Marist	W 73–65	17–9 (11–4)	MVP Arena (6,012); Albany, NY
February 17, 2023; 9:00 pm, ESPNU		Quinnipiac	L 63–66	17–10 (11–5)	MVP Arena (6,315); Albany, NY
February 24, 2023; 7:00 pm, ESPNU		at Rider	L 66–69	17–11 (11–6)	Alumni Gymnasium (1,650); Lawrenceville, NJ
February 26, 2023; 1:00 pm, ESPN3		at Iona	L 60–93	17–12 (11–7)	Hynes Athletic Center (2,644); New Rochelle, NY
March 2, 2023; 7:00 pm, ESPN+		Manhattan	L 66–67	17–13 (11–8)	MVP Arena (6,706); Albany, NY
March 4, 2023; 2:00 pm, ESPN3		at Saint Peter's	L 72–73 ^{OT}	17–14 (11–9)	Run Baby Run Arena (324); Jersey City, NJ
MAAC tournament
March 9, 2023; 9:30 pm, ESPN+	(4)	vs. (5) Niagara; Quarterfinals	L 65–71	17–15	Jim Whelan Boardwalk Hall (1,954); Atlantic City, NJ
*Non-conference game. ^{#}Rankings from AP Poll. (#) Tournament seedings in parentheses. All times are in Eastern.
