= 2022–23 Fairfield Stags men's basketball team =

American college basketball season

2022–23 Fairfield Stags men's basketball
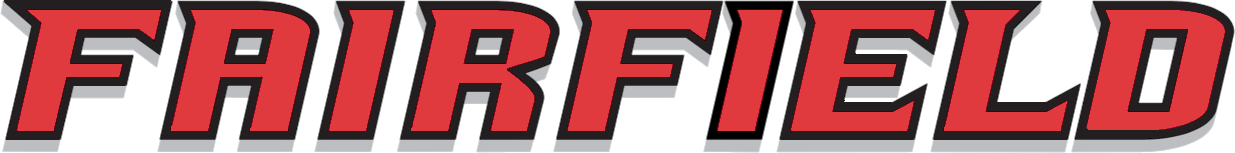
- Conference: Metro Atlantic Athletic Conference
- Record: 13–18 (9–11 MAAC)
- Head coach: Jay Young (4th season)
- Assistant coaches: Chris Casey; James Johns; Bryan Dougher
- Home arena: Leo D. Mahoney Arena

2022–23 MAAC men's basketball standings
	Conf.				Overall
Team	W		L	PCT	W		L	PCT
Iona †	17	–	3	.850	27	–	8	.771
Rider	13	–	7	.650	16	–	14	.533
Quinnipiac	11	–	9	.550	20	–	12	.625
Siena	11	–	9	.550	17	–	15	.531
Niagara	10	–	10	.500	16	–	15	.516
Manhattan	10	–	10	.500	12	–	18	.400
Fairfield	9	–	11	.450	13	–	18	.419
Mount St. Mary's	8	–	12	.400	13	–	20	.394
Canisius	8	–	12	.400	10	–	20	.333
Saint Peter's	7	–	13	.350	14	–	18	.438
Marist	6	–	14	.300	13	–	20	.394
† 2023 MAAC tournament winner

The 2022–23 Fairfield Stags men's basketball team represented Fairfield University in the 2022–23 NCAA Division I men's basketball season. The Stags, led by fourth-year head coach Jay Young, played their home games at the newly-opened Leo D. Mahoney Arena in Bridgeport, Connecticut as members of the Metro Atlantic Athletic Conference.

== Previous season ==
The Stags finished the 2021–22 season 15–18, 8–12 in MAAC play to finish in a tie for sixth place. As the No. 7 seed in the MAAC Tournament, they defeated No. 10 seed Canisius in the first round, but fell to No. 2 seed Saint Peter’s in the quarterfinals.

== Roster ==
2022–23 Fairfield Stags men's basketball team
Players
Coaches

Pos.	#	Name	Height	Weight	Year	Previous school	Hometown
G	0	Caleb Fields	6 ft 2 in (1.88 m)	185 lb (84 kg)	GS	Wildwood Catholic Academy; Bowling Green	Cape May Court House, NJ
F	1	Chris Cristian Maidoh	6 ft 10 in (2.08 m)	220 lb (100 kg)	Sr	Scotland Campus	New Carrollton, MD
G	2	Brycen Goodine	6 ft 4 in (1.93 m)	180 lb (82 kg)	Sr	St. Andrew's School	New Bedford, MA
G	3	Jalen Leach	6 ft 4 in (1.93 m)	200 lb (91 kg)	Jr	Tilton School	Nyack, NY
G	4	Jake Wojcik	6 ft 5 in (1.96 m)	190 lb (86 kg)	RS Sr	Bellarmine College Prep	San Jose, CA
F	5	Supreme Cook	6 ft 9 in (2.06 m)	220 lb (100 kg)	Jr	The Peddie School	East Orange, NJ
F	10	Allan Jeanne-Rose	6 ft 7 in (2.01 m)	200 lb (91 kg)	Sr	St. John Paul II Catholic High School (Florida)	Saint-Joseph, Martinique
F	11	Makai Willis	6 ft 9 in (2.06 m)	240 lb (109 kg)	So	Florida State University School	Tallahassee, FL
G	12	Jack Mullally	4 ft 10 in (1.47 m)	170 lb (77 kg)	Sr	Xavier High School	Belle Harbor, NY
G	13	Anthony Davis Jr.	6 ft 5 in (1.96 m)	180 lb (82 kg)	Fr	Miller School	Stephens City, VA
G	14	James Johns Jr.	6 ft 6 in (1.98 m)	185 lb (84 kg)	Fr	Long Island Lutheran High School	Claymont, DE
F	15	Jack Brown	6 ft 6 in (1.98 m)	200 lb (91 kg)	Jr	Brewster Academy	Greenville, DE
F	20	Zach Crisler	6 ft 9 in (2.06 m)	215 lb (98 kg)	Sr	La Salle College High School; Rice	North Wales, PA
G	21	Mark Henry	5 ft 11 in (1.8 m)	170 lb (77 kg)	Sr	Hamburg High School	Hamburg, NY
G/F	25	Michael Rogan	6 ft 7 in (2.01 m)	195 lb (88 kg)	Fr	Saratoga Springs High School; South Kent School	Saratoga Springs, NY
G	33	TJ Long	6 ft 4 in (1.93 m)	195 lb (88 kg)	So	Canterbury School	Rockville Centre, NY

Head coach

- Jay Young (Marist)

Assistant coach(es)

- Chris Casey (Western Connecticut State)
- James Johns (Marshall)
- Bryan Dougher (Stony Brook)

Legend

- (C) Team captain
- (S) Suspended
- (I) Ineligible
- (W) Walk-on
- Injured
- Current redshirt

Roster
Last update: November 21, 2022

== Schedule and results ==
Date time, TV	Rank^{#}	Opponent^{#}	Result	Record	High points	High rebounds	High assists	Site (attendance) city, state
Exhibition
October 30, 2022*; 1:00 pm, B1G+		at Rutgers	L 65–78	–	13 – Fields	7 – Cook	3 – Wojcik	Jersey Mike's Arena (2,000); Piscataway, NJ
Regular season
November 7, 2022*; 8:00 pm, ESPN+		at Wake Forest	L 59–71	0–1	14 – Fields	8 – Jeanne-Rose	3 – Jeanne-Rose	LJVM Coliseum (5,335); Winston-Salem, NC
November 11, 2022*; 1:00 pm, ESPN3		at New Hampshire	L 71–83	0–2	19 – Fields	7 – Fields	4 – Jeanne-Rose	Lundholm Gym (682); Durham, NH
November 15, 2022*; 9:00 pm, FS2		at Xavier	L 65–78	0–3	19 – Cook	4 – Fields	4 – Fields	Cintas Center (9,624); Cincinnati, OH
November 18, 2022*; 7:00 pm, NEC Front Row		at Wagner	L 52–68	0–4	16 – Fields	9 – Cook	2 – Fields	Spiro Sports Center (1,024); Staten Island, NY
November 25, 2022*; 4:00 pm, BeTheBeast Event Live+		vs. Towson; Hostilo Hoops Community Classic	W 74–69	1–4	15 – Long	7 – Cook	1 – Tied	Enmarket Arena (331); Savannah, GA
November 26, 2022*; 7:30 pm, BeTheBeast Event Live+		vs. Mercer; Hostilo Hoops Community Classic	L 58–60	1–5	17 – Cook	7 – Cook & Long	5 – Fields	Enmarket Arena (302); Savannah, GA
November 27, 2022*; 7:30 pm, BeTheBeast Event Live+		vs. Evansville; Hostilo Hoops Community Classic	W 63–56	2–5	21 – Fields	11 – Cook	2 – 3 Tied	Enmarket Arena (223); Savannah, GA
December 1, 2022; 7:00 pm, ESPN+		at Manhattan	L 53–56	2–6 (0–1)	12 – Fields	11 – Cook	2 – Long	Draddy Gymnasium (587); Riverdale, NY
December 3, 2022; 7:00 pm, ESPN3		Saint Peter’s	W 67–55	3–6 (1–1)	19 – Fields	11 – Cook	3 – Leach	Leo D. Mahoney Arena (3,516); Fairfield, CT
December 7, 2022*; 7:00 pm, ESPN+		Sacred Heart	W 61–59	4–6	18 – Fields	13 – Cook	3 – 2 Tied	Leo D. Mahoney Arena (2,819); Fairfield, CT
December 12, 2022*; 7:00 pm, ESPN+		Yale	L 64–77	4–7	17 – Cook	8 – Cook	2 – 2 Tied	Leo D. Mahoney Arena (2,552); Fairfield, CT
December 18, 2022*; 2:00 pm, ESPN+		Coast Guard	W 86–45	5–7	21 – Cook	13 – Cook	5 – Jeanne-Rose	Leo D. Mahoney Arena (1,566); Fairfield, CT
December 22, 2022*; 7:00 pm, ESPN+		Drexel	Canceled					Leo D. Mahoney Arena; Fairfield, CT
December 30, 2022; 7:00 pm, ESPN3		Marist	W 73–54	6–7 (2–1)	25 – Long	7 – Cook	5 – Fields	Leo D. Mahoney Arena (1,802); Fairfield, CT
January 1, 2022; 2:00 pm, ESPN3		Siena	L 61–70	6–8 (2–2)	19 – Long	8 – Jeanne-Rose	3 – Jeanne-Rose	Leo D. Mahoney Arena (2,224); Fairfield, CT
January 6, 2022; 7:00 pm, ESPN3		Niagara	L 69–77 ^{OT}	6–9 (2–3)	17 – Cook	17 – Cook	2 – Fields	Leo D. Mahoney Arena (1,885); Fairfield, CT
January 13, 2022; 7:00 pm, ESPN+		at Iona	L 69–75	6–10 (2–4)	18 – Long	8 – Jeanne-Rose	7 – Wojcik	Hynes Athletics Center (2,654); New Rochelle, NY
January 15, 2022; 2:00 pm, ESPN+		at Saint Peter’s	W 56–52	7–10 (3–4)	17 – Wojcik	8 – Cook	3 – Wojcik	Run Baby Run Arena (443); Jersey City, NJ
January 20, 2022; 7:00 pm, ESPN+		Canisius	W 67–58	8–10 (4–4)	18 – Wojcik	12 – Cook	3 – Fields	Leo D. Mahoney Arena (3,219); Fairfield, CT
January 22, 2022; 2:00 pm, ESPN+		at Siena	W 62–52	9–10 (5–4)	12 – Cook	9 – Maidoh	4 – Fields	MVP Arena (6,410); Albany, NY
January 26, 2022; 7:00 pm, ESPN+		at Mount St. Mary’s	W 63–60	10–10 (6–4)	16 – Jeanne-Rose	11 – Cook	3 – Jeanne-Rose	Knott Arena (1,711); Emmitsburg, MD
January 29, 2022; 2:00 pm, ESPN3		Rider	L 69–78 ^{OT}	10–11 (6–5)	16 – Cook	10 – Cook	3 – Cook	Leo D. Mahoney Arena (2,388); Fairfield, CT
February 3, 2022; 7:00 pm, ESPN+		at Quinnipiac	L 51–66	10–12 (6–6)	17 – Jeanne-Rose	7 – Cook	2 – Fields	M&T Bank Arena (3,519); Hamden, CT
February 5, 2022; 2:00 pm, ESPN3		Iona	L 61–70	10–13 (6–7)	16 – Cook	6 – Long	3 – Tied	Leo D. Mahoney Arena (3,605); Fairfield, CT
February 10, 2022; 7:00 pm, ESPN+		at Rider	L 57–58	10–14 (6–8)	16 – Cook	6 – Willis	2 – Fields	Alumni Gymnasium (1,650); Lawrenceville, NJ
February 12, 2022; 2:00 pm, ESPN3		Mount St. Mary’s	W 76–72 ^{OT}	11–14 (7–8)	21 – Long	14 – Cook	3 – Leach	Leo D. Mahoney Arena (1,957); Fairfield, CT
February 17, 2022; 7:00 pm, ESPN+		at Marist	W 70–61	12–14 (8–8)	21 – Tied	11 – Cook	4 – Fields	McCann Arena (926); Poughkeepsie, NY
February 19, 2022; 2:00 pm, ESPN3		Manhattan	L 72–73	12–15 (8–9)	23 – Long	17 – Cook	4 – Tied	Leo D. Mahoney Arena (2,958); Fairfield, CT
February 24, 2022; 7:00 pm, ESPN+		at Niagara	L 68–76	12–16 (8–10)	17 – Tied	9 – Cook	3 – Jeanne-Rose	Gallagher Center (1,321); Lewiston, NY
February 26, 2022; 1:00 pm, ESPN3		at Canisius	L 51–64	12–17 (8–11)	15 – Fields	6 – Tied	3 – Tied	Koessler Athletic Center (696); Buffalo, NY
March 2, 2022; 7:30 pm, ESPN3		Quinnipiac	W 92–82	13–17 (9–11)	26 – Cook	9 – Jeanne-Rose	5 – Jeanne-Rose	Leo D. Mahoney Arena (2,748); Fairfield, CT
MAAC Tournament
March 7, 2023; 7:00 pm, ESPN+	(7)	vs. (10) Saint Peter's; First round	L 52–70	13–18	12 – Maidoh	9 – Cook	3 – Tied	Boardwalk Hall; Atlantic City, NJ
*Non-conference game. ^{#}Rankings from AP Poll. (#) Tournament seedings in parentheses. All times are in Eastern.
