= 2023 MAAC men's basketball tournament =

- Classification: Division I
- Season: 2022–23
- Teams: 11
- Site: Jim Whelan Boardwalk Hall; Atlantic City, New Jersey
- Champions: Iona (14th title)
- Winning coach: Rick Pitino (2nd title)
- Television: ESPNews, ESPNU, ESPN+

2022–23 MAAC men's basketball standings
	Conf.				Overall
Team	W		L	PCT	W		L	PCT
Iona †	17	–	3	.850	27	–	8	.771
Rider	13	–	7	.650	16	–	14	.533
Quinnipiac	11	–	9	.550	20	–	12	.625
Siena	11	–	9	.550	17	–	15	.531
Niagara	10	–	10	.500	16	–	15	.516
Manhattan	10	–	10	.500	12	–	18	.400
Fairfield	9	–	11	.450	13	–	18	.419
Mount St. Mary's	8	–	12	.400	13	–	20	.394
Canisius	8	–	12	.400	10	–	20	.333
Saint Peter's	7	–	13	.350	14	–	18	.438
Marist	6	–	14	.300	13	–	20	.394
† 2023 MAAC tournament winner

The 2023 Metro Atlantic Athletic Conference men's basketball tournament was the postseason men's basketball tournament for the Metro Atlantic Athletic Conference for the 2022–23 NCAA Division I men's basketball season. The tournament was played March 7–11, 2023, at the Jim Whelan Boardwalk Hall in Atlantic City, New Jersey, for the fourth year in a row. The tournament winner received the conference's automatic bid to the 2023 NCAA Division I men's basketball tournament. The defending champions were the Saint Peter's Peacocks.

== Seeds ==
All 11 teams in the conference participated in the Tournament. The top five teams received byes to the quarterfinals. Teams were seeded by record within the conference, with a tiebreaker system to seed teams with identical conference records.

Seed	School	Conference	Tiebreaker 1	Tiebreaker 2
1	Iona	17–3		
2	Rider	13–7		
3	Quinnipiac	11–9	1–1 vs. Siena	2–0 vs. Rider
4	Siena	11–9	1–1 vs. Quinnipiac	1–1 vs. Rider
5	Niagara	10–10	1–1 vs. Manhattan	1–1 vs. Rider
6	Manhattan	10–10	1–1 vs. Niagara	0–2 vs. Rider
7	Fairfield	9–11		
8	Mount St. Mary's	8–12	2–0 vs. Canisius	
9	Canisius	8–12	0–2 vs. Mount St. Mary's	
10	Saint Peter's	7–13		
11	Marist	6–14		

== Schedule ==
Session	Game	Time*	Matchup	Score	Attendance	Television
First round – Tuesday, March 7
1	1	5:00 pm	No. 8 Mount St. Mary's vs No. 9 Canisius	67–66^{OT}		ESPN+
1	2	7:00 pm	No. 7 Fairfield vs No. 10 Saint Peter's	52–70		ESPN+
1	3	9:00 pm	No. 6 Manhattan vs No. 11 Marist	50–61		ESPN+
Quarterfinals – Wednesday, March 8
2	4	7:00 pm	No. 1 Iona vs No. 8 Mount St. Mary's	74–54		ESPN+
2	5	9:30 pm	No. 2 Rider vs No. 10 Saint Peter's	62–70		ESPN+
Quarterfinals – Thursday, March 9
3	6	7:00 pm	No. 3 Quinnipiac vs No. 11 Marist	59–75		ESPN+
3	7	9:30 pm	No. 4 Siena vs No. 5 Niagara	65–71		ESPN+
Semifinals – Friday, March 10
4	8	6:00 pm	No. 1 Iona vs No. 5 Niagara	71–59		ESPNEWS
4	9	8:30 pm	No. 11 Marist vs No. 10 Saint Peter's	69–57		ESPNEWS
Championship – Saturday, March 11
5	10	7:30 pm	No. 1 Iona vs No. 11 Marist	76–55		ESPNU
*Game times in ET. Rankings denote tournament seeding.

== Bracket ==
First round Tuesday, March 7
8	Mount St. Mary's	67*
9	Canisius	66
7	Fairfield	52
10	Saint Peter's	70
6	Manhattan	50
11	Marist	61

Quarterfinals; Wednesday & Thursday, March 8/9
1	Iona	74
8	Mount St. Mary's	54
4	Siena	65
5	Niagara	71
2	Rider	62
10	Saint Peter's	70
3	Quinnipiac	59
11	Marist	75

Semifinals; Friday, March 10
1	Iona	71
5	Niagara	59
10	Saint Peter's	57
11	Marist	69

Championship; Saturday, March 11
1	Iona	76
11	Marist	55

* denotes number of overtimes

== See also ==
- 2023 MAAC women's basketball tournament
