= 2022–23 Metro Atlantic Athletic Conference men's basketball season =

- League: NCAA Division I
- Sport: Basketball
- Duration: November 2022–March 2023
- Teams: 11
- TV partner(s): ESPN2, ESPN3, ESPNU, ESPN+

Regular season
- Regular season champions: Iona Gaels
- Runners-up: Rider Broncs
- Season MVP: Walter Clayton Jr. (Iona)
- Top scorer: Noah Thomasson (Niagara) 19.5

2023 MAAC Tournament
- Champions: Iona Gaels
- Runners-up: Marist Red Foxes
- Tournament MVP: Daniss Jenkins (Iona)

Metro Atlantic Athletic Conference men's basketball seasons
- ← 2021–22 2023–24 →

2022–23 MAAC men's basketball standings
	Conf.				Overall
Team	W		L	PCT	W		L	PCT
Iona †	17	–	3	.850	27	–	8	.771
Rider	13	–	7	.650	16	–	14	.533
Quinnipiac	11	–	9	.550	20	–	12	.625
Siena	11	–	9	.550	17	–	15	.531
Niagara	10	–	10	.500	16	–	15	.516
Manhattan	10	–	10	.500	12	–	18	.400
Fairfield	9	–	11	.450	13	–	18	.419
Mount St. Mary's	8	–	12	.400	13	–	20	.394
Canisius	8	–	12	.400	10	–	20	.333
Saint Peter's	7	–	13	.350	14	–	18	.438
Marist	6	–	14	.300	13	–	20	.394
† 2023 MAAC tournament winner

The 2022–23 Metro Atlantic Athletic Conference (MAAC) men's basketball season began with practices in October 2022, followed by the start of the 2022–23 NCAA Division I men's basketball season in November. Conference play started in December and concluded in March 2023. This was the 42nd season of MAAC basketball.

The 2023 MAAC tournament was played March 7–11, 2023 at the Jim Whelan Boardwalk Hall in Atlantic City, New Jersey for the fourth year in a row.

This was the first season in the MAAC for Mount St. Mary's. On May 2, 2022, it was announced that the Mountaineers would leave the Northeast Conference and join the MAAC on July 1, 2022. They replace Monmouth, which left the MAAC after last season and joined the Colonial Athletic Association on July 1, 2022.

== Head coaches ==
=== Coaching changes ===
On March 30, 2022, head coach and Seton Hall alum Shaheen Holloway of Saint Peter's left to take the head coaching position at his alma mater, where he previously was an assistant from 2010 through 2018. Former Wagner head coach Bashir Mason was hired as Saint Peter's 16th men's head basketball coach on April 12, 2022. On October 25, 2022, less than two weeks before the start of the Manhattan Jaspers' season, head coach Steve Masiello was fired. Associate head coach and former player RaShawn Stores was named interim head coach.

=== Coaches ===
Team	Head coach	Previous job	Years at school	Overall record	MAAC record	MAAC titles	MAAC tourney titles	NCAA tournaments
Canisius	Reggie Witherspoon	Chattanooga (asst.)	7	84–92 (.477)	57–51 (.528)	1	0	0
Fairfield	Jay Young	Rutgers (asst.)	4	37–54 (.407)	22–35 (.386)	0	0	0
Iona	Rick Pitino	Louisville	3	37–14 (.725)	23–6 (.793)	1	1	1
Manhattan	RaShawn Stores	Manhattan (asst.)	1	0–0 (–)	0–0 (–)	0	0	0
Marist	John Dunne	Saint Peter's	5	45–67 (.402)	32–44 (.421)	0	0	0
Mount St. Mary's	Dan Engelstad	Southern Vermont	5	46–70 (.397)	0–0 (–)	0	0	0
Niagara	Greg Paulus	George Washington (asst.)	4	35–47 (.427)	25–31 (.446)	0	0	0
Quinnipiac	Baker Dunleavy	Villanova (asst.)	6	66–81 (.449)	42–49 (.462)	0	0	0
Rider	Kevin Baggett	Rider (assoc. HC)	11	161–152 (.514)	105–87 (.547)	1	0	0
Saint Peter's	Bashir Mason	Wagner	1	0–0 (–)	0–0 (–)	0	0	0
Siena	Carmen Maciariello	Siena (asst.)	4	47–29 (.618)	39–21 (.650)	2	0	0

Notes:

- All records, appearances, titles, etc. are from time with current school only.
- Year at school includes 2022–23 season.
- Overall and MAAC/NCAA records are from time at current school and are before the beginning of the 2022–23 season.
- Previous jobs are head coaching jobs unless otherwise noted.

== Preseason ==
=== Preseason coaches poll ===
Rank	Team
1.	Iona (10)
2.	Manhattan (1)
3.	Rider
4.	Quinnipiac
5.	Fairfield
6.	Siena
7.	Marist
T8.	Niagara
T8.	Saint Peter's
10.	Mount St. Mary's
11.	Canisius

( ) first-place votes

=== Preseason All-MAAC teams ===
2022–23 MAAC men's basketball preseason All-MAAC teams
First team	Second team	Third team
Supreme Cook, Fairfield; Nelly Junior Joseph^{†}, Iona; Jose Perez^{†}, Manhattan; Matt Balanc^{†}, Quinnipiac; Dwight Murray Jr.^{†}, Rider	Jordan Henderson, Canisius; Walter Clayton Jr., Iona; Ant Nelson, Manhattan; Noah Thomasson, Niagara; Jackson Stormo, Siena	Jake Wojcik, Fairfield; Jalen Benjamin, Mount St. Mary's; Dezi Jones, Quinnipiac; Mervin James, Rider; Allen Powell, Rider

† denotes unanimous selection

=== Preseason Player of the Year ===
Recipient	School
Jose Perez	Manhattan

== MAAC regular season ==
=== Conference matrix ===
This table summarizes the final head-to-head results between teams in conference play during the 2022–23 season.

	Canisius	Fairfield	Iona	Manhattan	Marist	Mt. St. Mary's	Niagara	Quinnipiac	Rider	Saint Peter's	Siena
vs. Canisius		0–0	0–0	0–0	0–0	0–0	0–0	0–0	0–0	0–0	0–0
vs. Fairfield	0–0		0–0	0–0	0–0	0–0	0–0	0–0	0–0	0–0	0–0
vs. Iona	0–0	0–0		0–0	0–0	0–0	0–0	0–0	0–0	0–0	0–0
vs. Manhattan	0–0	0–0	0–0		0–0	0–0	0–0	0–0	0–0	0–0	0–0
vs. Marist	0–0	0–0	0–0	0–0		0–0	0–0	0–0	0–0	0–0	0–0
vs. Mount St. Mary's	0–0	0–0	0–0	0–0	0–0		0–0	0–0	0–0	0–0	0–0
vs. Niagara	0–0	0–0	0–0	0–0	0–0	0–0		0–0	0–0	0–0	0–0
vs. Quinnipiac	0–0	0–0	0–0	0–0	0–0	0–0	0–0		0–0	0–0	0–0
vs. Rider	0–0	0–0	0–0	0–0	0–0	0–0	0–0	0–0		0–0	0–0
vs. Saint Peter's	0–0	0–0	0–0	0–0	0–0	0–0	0–0	0–0	0–0		0–0
vs. Siena	0–0	0–0	0–0	0–0	0–0	0–0	0–0	0–0	0–0	0–0	
Total	0–0	0–0	0–0	0–0	0–0	0–0	0–0	0–0	0–0	0–0	0–0

=== Player of the week ===
Throughout the regular season, the Metro Atlantic Athletic Conference offices named player(s) of the week and rookie(s) of the week.

Week	Player of the week	Rookie of the week
1	Javian McCollum, Siena	Tahj Staveskie, Canisius
2	Noah Thomasson, Niagara	Tahj Staveskie (2), Canisius
3	Javian McCollum (2), Siena	Michael Eley, Siena
4	Daniss Jenkins, Iona	Tahj Staveskie (3), Canisius
5	Nelly Junior Joseph, Iona	Tahj Staveskie (4), Canisius
6	Nelly Junior Joseph (2), Iona	James Johns Jr., Fairfield
7	Nelly Junior Joseph (3), Iona	Michael Eley (2), Siena
8	Nelly Junior Joseph (4), Iona	Michael Eley (3), Siena
9	Jackson Stormo, Siena	Cruz Davis, Iona
10	Patrick Gardner, Marist	Isaiah Brickner, Marist
11	Mervin James, Rider	Michael Eley (4), Siena
12	Michael Baer, Siena	Trace Salton, Marist
13	Noah Thomasson (2), Niagara	Isaiah Brickner (2), Marist
14	Walter Clayton Jr., Iona	Michael Eley (5), Siena
15	Nelly Junior Joseph (5), Iona	Tahj Staveskie (5), Canisius
16	Walter Clayton Jr. (2), Iona	Michael Eley (6), Siena
17	Daniss Jenkins (2), Iona	Tahj Staveskie (6), Canisius

=== Records against other conferences ===
Records against non-conference foes for the 2022–23 season. Records shown for regular season only.

Power 7 Conferences	Record
American	0–0
ACC	0–0
Big East	0–0
Big Ten	0–0
Big 12	0–0
Pac-12	0–0
SEC	0–0
Power 7 total	0–0
Other NCAA Division I conferences	Record
America East	0–0
A-10	0–0
ASUN	0–0
Big Sky	0–0
Big South	0–0
Big West	0–0
CAA	0–0
C-USA	0–0
Horizon League	0–0
Ivy League	0–0
MAC	0–0
MEAC	0–0
MVC	0–0
Mountain West	0–0
NEC	0–0
OVC	0–0
Patriot League	0–0
SoCon	0–0
Southland	0–0
SWAC	0–0
The Summit	0–0
Sun Belt	0–0
WAC	0–0
WCC	0–0
Other Division I total	0–0
NCAA Division I total	0–0

== Postseason ==
=== MAAC tournament ===
- 2023 Metro Atlantic Athletic Conference basketball tournament, Jim Whelan Boardwalk Hall, Atlantic City, New Jersey

== Bracket ==
First round Tuesday, March 7
8	Mount St. Mary's	67*
9	Canisius	66
7	Fairfield	52
10	Saint Peter's	70
6	Manhattan	50
11	Marist	61

Quarterfinals; Wednesday & Thursday, March 8/9
1	Iona	74
8	Mount St. Mary's	54
4	Siena	65
5	Niagara	71
2	Rider	62
10	Saint Peter's	70
3	Quinnipiac	59
11	Marist	75

Semifinals; Friday, March 10
1	Iona	71
5	Niagara	59
10	Saint Peter's	57
11	Marist	69

Championship; Saturday, March 11
1	Iona	76
11	Marist	55

* denotes number of overtimes

== Honors and awards ==
=== MAAC season awards ===
2022–23 MAAC men's basketball major individual awards
Award	Recipient(s)
Player of the Year	Walter Clayton Jr., Iona
Coach of the Year	Rick Pitino, Iona
Rookie of the Year	Michael Eley, Siena
Defensive Player of the Year	Berrick JeanLouis, Iona; Josh Roberts, Manhattan
Sixth Player of the Year	TJ Long, Fairfield

2022–23 MAAC men's basketball all-conference teams
First team	Second team	Third team	Rookie team
Walter Clayton Jr.^{†}, Iona; Nelly Junior Joseph, Iona; Ant Nelson, Manhattan; Noah Thomasson^{†}, Niagara; Dwight Murray Jr.^{†}, Rider	Daniss Jenkins, Iona; Patrick Gardner, Marist; Dezi Jones, Quinnipiac; Mervin James, Rider; Jackson Stormo, Siena	Jordan Henderson, Canisius; Supreme Cook, Fairfield; Josh Roberts, Manhattan; Jalen Benjamin, Mount St. Mary's; Javian McCollum, Siena	Tahj Staveskie^{†}, Canisius; Cruz Davis^{†}, Iona; Isaiah Brickner^{†}, Marist; Corey Washington, Saint Peter's; Michael Eley^{†}, Siena

† denotes unanimous selection

=== All-MAAC tournament team ===
2023 MAAC men's basketball all-championship team
^{MVP}Daniss Jenkins, Iona
Walter Clayton Jr., Iona
Nelly Junior Joseph, Iona
Isaiah Brickner, Marist
Patrick Gardner, Marist
Noah Thomasson, Niagara
Jaylen Murray, Saint Peter's
