= Hynes Athletics Center =

College sports arena in New Rochelle, New York, U.S.

- Hynes Center
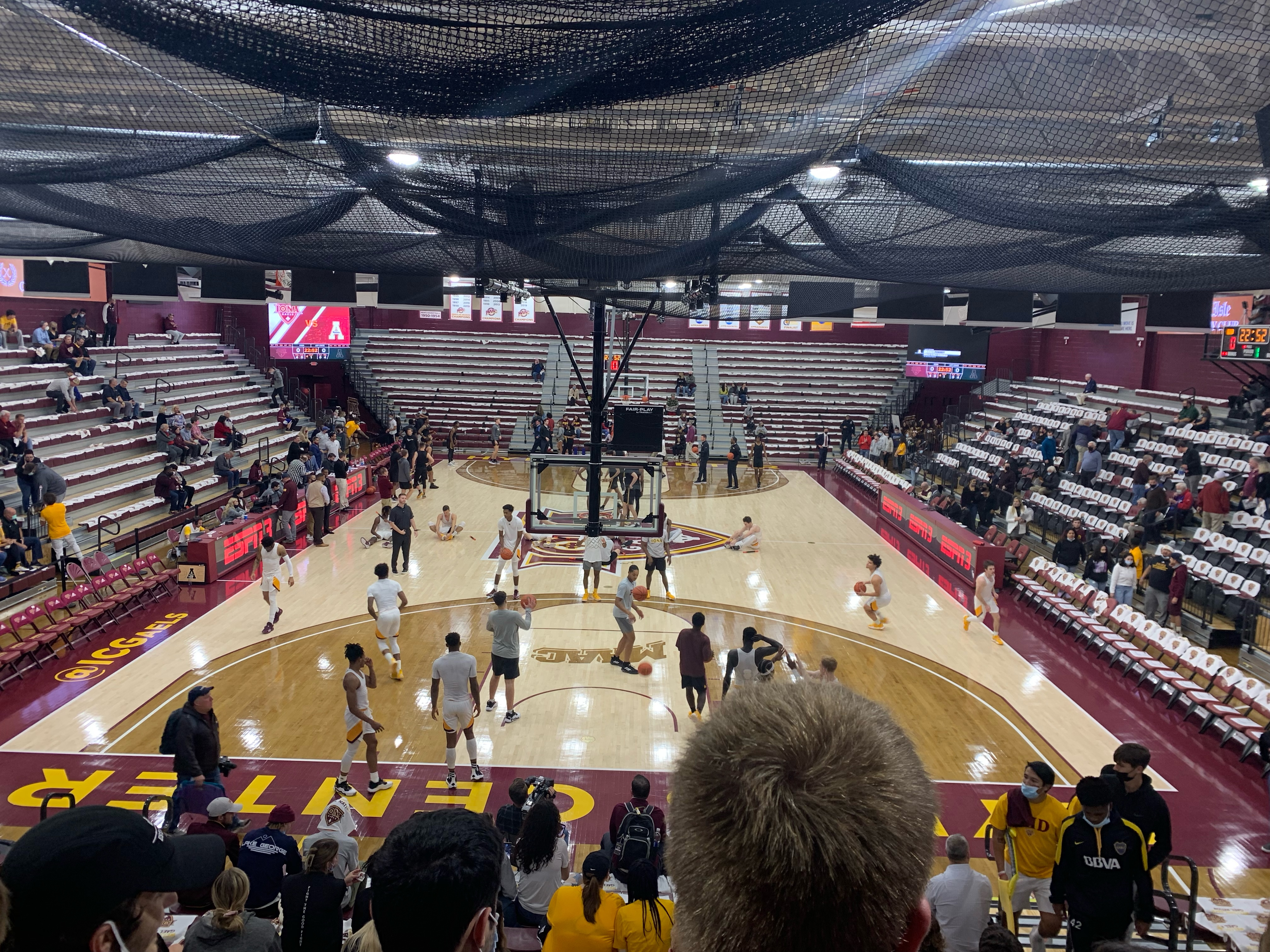
- Hynes Athletics Center before a 2021 basketball game
- Interactive map of Hynes Athletics Center
- Full name: James P. Hynes Athletics Center
- Former names: John A. Mulcahy Campus Events Center (1974–2005)
- Location: New Rochelle, New York
- Coordinates: 40.92664°N 73.784325°W
- Owner: Iona University
- Operator: Iona Gaels
- Capacity: Basketball: 2,578; Volleyball: 1,000
- Surface: Hardwood

Construction
- Groundbreaking: 1973
- Opened: September 1, 1974
- Renovated: Summer—Winter 2019
- Cost: $15 million ($97.9 million in 2025 dollars)
- Architect: Anthony Pucillo
- Project managers: Darante Construction, Ltd.

Tenants
- Iona Gaels (MAAC) (1974–present); Westchester Golden Apples (USBL) (1986)

Website
- www.icgaels.com

The James P. Hynes Athletics Center is a 2,578-seat multi-purpose arena in New Rochelle, New York. It was built in 1974 and is home to the Iona University Gaels basketball and volleyball teams.

In 2005, the building was renamed the Hynes Center, after being formerly known as the John A. Mulcahy Campus Events Center.

Between the summer and fall of 2019, Hynes Athletics Center received a total of $6.5 million to expand and modernize the athletic center. The athletic center's renovations were completed in October 2019.

== See also ==
- List of NCAA Division I basketball arenas
