= Righton =

Righton is a surname. Notable people with the surname include:

- Alan Righton (1905–1982), Australian rugby league footballer
- Caroline Righton (born 1958), English television presenter and author
- Edward Righton (actor) (1838–1899), English actor
- Edward Righton junior (1912–1986), English first-class cricketer
- Edward Righton senior (1884–1964), English first-class cricketer
- James Righton (born 1983), English musician
- Len Righton (1898–1972), New Zealand rugby union player
- Peter Righton (1926–2007), child protection expert, social care worker, convicted child molester
- Sybilla Righton Masters (1676–1720), American inventor

== Other ==
- Righton Big Wing, a New Zealand glider

== See also ==
- Ride On (disambiguation)
- Right On (disambiguation)
- Write On (disambiguation)
- Ryton (disambiguation)
