= Brian Taylor (lecturer) =

Sociology lecturer at the University of Sussex

- Born: March 1950
- Died: September 2016 (aged 66)
- Citizenship: British
- Occupations: Lecturer, biographer, author
- Years active: 1976 - 2001

Academic background
- Education: University of Aberdeen (M.A., B.A., D.Phil)
- Alma mater: University of Aberdeen
- Thesis: Sociological Factors in Patterns of Religious Conversion and in their investigation (1976)
- Doctoral advisor: Peter McCaffery

Academic work
- Discipline: Sociology
- Institutions: University of Sussex
- Notable works: The Green Avenue: The Life and Writings of Forrest Reid, 1875-1947 (1982)

Brian Taylor (March 1950 - September 2016) was a sociology lecturer from the University of Sussex, biographer and author. He wrote the second biography of Forrest Reid, The Green Avenue (1982), and edited Reid's works in the book Retrospective Adventures: Forrest Reid, Author and Collector (1998).

== Biography ==
Taylor received his B.A. and M.A. in sociology, as well as his D.Phil, at the University of Aberdeen. After teaching sociology for a year at Queen's University, he became a lecturer at the University of Sussex in 1977, a position that he held until his retirement in 2001.

He wrote a biography of Irish novelist Forrest Reid titled The Green Avenue: The Life and Writings of Forrest Reid, 1875-1947 (1982). It is the first biography of Reid after Russell Burlingham's 1953 book. The primary literature the book is based on includes unpublished writings from people who were close to Reid during his lifetime, as wel as Burlingham's book.

Taylor was a member of the editorial board of Theory, Culture & Society and has also been a review editor of Sociology. During the 1970s and 80s, he was the research director of Paedophile Information Exchange, where he edited the organization's newsletter. In Perspectives on Pedophilia (1981), he compiled essays on the topic by researchers Peter Righton, Ken Plummer and Morris Fraser, among others. Taylor has also written a biography of James Owen Hannay and co-edited a volume of Reid's works alongside Paul Goldman.

== Personal life ==
Following his retirement in 2001, Taylor moved to Prades, in Southern France, alongside his partner and former radio host Brian Barfield. The two had met after Barfield invited Taylor to discuss Forrest Reid on Radio Ulster and Radio 3, after which they remained together for 40 years until Taylor's death.
