= Perspectives on Paedophilia =

1981 book

- Editor: Brian Taylor
- Language: English
- Genre: Non-fiction
- Publisher: Batsford Books
- Publication date: 1981
- Publication place: United Kingdom
- Pages: 148
- ISBN: 9780713437188

Perspectives on Paedophilia is a book edited by University of Sussex lecturer Brian Taylor, published by Batsford in 1981. It contains chapters written by Ken Plummer, Richard Card, Peter Righton, Morris Fraser and John Hart, among other researchers.

== Research ==
Taylor wrote in the introduction that he intended it to be "a book to which professionals might refer when encountering an aspect of paedophilia and when they wish to have some ready source of information and guidance at their disposal.”

A chapter by Richard Card explores the topic of pedophilia and English law. Another chapter by Graham E. Powell and A. J. Chalkley explores the consequences of sexual acts between adults and children, which they conclude by stating that they are not traumatic to children. Plummer's chapter explores the topic of pro-pedophile activism, its ideology and issues pedophiles face in society.

== Reception ==
A review on Behaviour Research and Therapy described the book as an "[o]verall a good book for anyone who is interested in the subject, made essential reading by Plummer’s view". Another review on Critical Social Policy stated that the book "provide[s] invaluable material for the essential, basic, discussions we need on this issue."

On Behaviour Research and Therapy, a review described the book as an "unsatisfying volume", with the exception of Sean McConville’s and Plummer's chapters. John Marshall on the The British Journal of Criminology said that the book "will at least provide a focus for debate among those practitioners" interested on the topic, but criticized the contradicting views between the different contributors.
