= Write On =

Write On may refer to:

- Write On (TV series), an educational television show which was produced and broadcast by TVOntario
- Write On (album), a 1976 album by The Hollies

== See also ==
- Right On (disambiguation)
- Righton (surname)
- Ryton (disambiguation)
