= The Death of Narcissus =

1976 book by Morris Fraser

- Author: Morris Fraser
- Language: English
- Publisher: Secker and Warburg
- Publication date: 1976
- Publication place: United Kingdom
- Pages: 244
- ISBN: 978-0436164668

The Death of Narcissus is an analytical psychology book about pedophilic themes in fictional Western literature, written by Morris Fraser and published by Secker & Warburg in 1976.

== Content ==
Fraser analyses common motifs of childhood and pedophilia throughout the book a number of novels from classic Western novelists, such as Lewis Carroll, Forrest Reid, James Barrie, Henry James, George MacDonald and Charles Kingsley, among others, such as Vladimir Nabokov and Thomas Mann.

The book presents the thesis that pedophiles are in love with themselves as children, whose images they project onto other children. Fraser draws a parallel between this kind of love of oneself and Narcissus', and relates it to the Oedipus complex. Much of the theories used on the book is drawn from Carl Jung, although some of it deviates from mainstream jungianism.

== Reception ==
A 1978 review by Louis Zinkin published on the Journal of Analytical Psychology described the book as a "welcome contribution to a hitherto neglected topic." The review stated that the book "makes [a] fascinating reading" and that it is beautifully and sensitively written.
