= Eric Rogers =

Eric Rogers may refer to:

- Eric Rogers (composer) (1921–1981), British composer, conductor and arranger
- Eric M. Rogers (1902–1990), physics educator
- Eric Rogers (gridiron football) (born 1991), gridiron football wide receiver
- Eric Rogers (defensive back) (born 2002), American football defensive back

== See also ==
- Erik Rogers, American singer of metal band Stereomud
