= Retrospective Adventures: Forrest Reid, Author and Collector =

1998 anthology book

- Author: Paul Goldman and Brian Taylor
- Language: English
- Publisher: Scolar Pr
- Publication date: 1998
- Publication place: United Kingdom
- ISBN: 978-1859284636

Retrospective Adventures: Forrest Reid, Author and Collector is an anthology book of Forrest Reid edited by Paul Goldman and Brian Taylor.
