= The Green Avenue =

Biographical book of Forrest Reid

The Green Avenue: The Life and Writings of Forrest Reid, 1875-1947
- Author: Brian Taylor
- Language: English
- Publisher: Cambridge University Press
- Publication date: 1980
- Publication place: United Kingdom
- Pages: 232
- ISBN: 978-0521228015

The Green Avenue: The Life and Writings of Forrest Reid, 1875-1947 is a biographical book of Forrest Reid written by Brian Taylor and published by Cambridge University Press in 1980. It is the second biography of Reid's life.

== Contents ==
The book examines Reid's life, his novels and the relationship between the two. It is based on Reid's autobiographical notes, the 1953 biography of Reid by Russell Burlingham, and unpublished letters and writings of Reid's and his personal associates.

== Reception ==
Hilary Pyle wrote on The Review of English Studies that the book was "elegantly written" and that Taylor had conducted "his investigation in a sympathetic and satisfying fashion".

J. C. Beckett, writing on the The Yearbook of English Studies, described the book as a "well-written and elegant study" of Reid's life and writings.
