= Ka'dar Hollman =

American football player (born 1994)

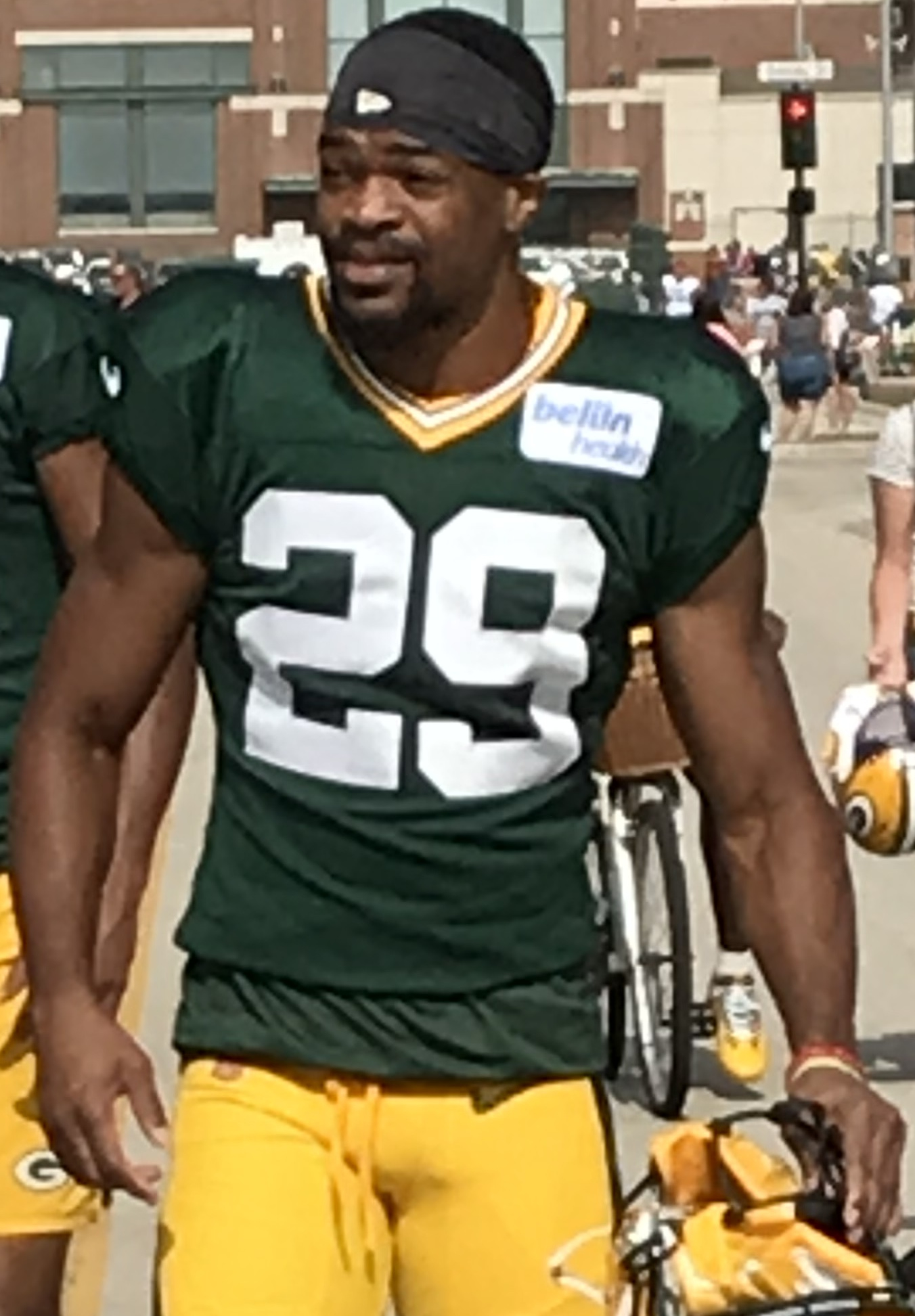
- Hollman with the Green Bay Packers in 2019

Profile
- Position: Cornerback

Personal information
- Born: September 18, 1994 (age 32); Trenton, New Jersey, U.S.
- Listed height: 6 ft 0 in (1.83 m)
- Listed weight: 196 lb (89 kg)

Career information
- High school: Burlington Township (Burlington Township, New Jersey)
- College: Toledo (2015–2018)
- NFL draft: 2019: 6th round, 185th overall pick

Career history
- Green Bay Packers (2019–2020); Houston Texans (2021)*; New Orleans Saints (2021)*; New York Giants (2021)*; San Francisco 49ers (2022)*; Atlanta Falcons (2022)*; San Francisco 49ers (2022)*; Miami Dolphins (2022)*; Houston Texans (2023); Baltimore Ravens (2024)*; Houston Texans (2024)
- * Offseason or practice squad member only

Career NFL statistics as of 2024
- Total tackles: 33
- Pass deflections: 5
- Fumble recoveries: 1
- Stats at Pro Football Reference

Ka’dar Chaz Hollman (born September 18, 1994) is an American professional football cornerback. He played college football for the Toledo Rockets. He was selected in the sixth round of the 2019 NFL draft to the Green Bay Packers. He also played for the New Orleans Saints, New York Giants, San Francisco 49ers, Miami Dolphins, and Atlanta Falcons.

Hollman graduated from Burlington Township High School in 2013 and did a post-graduate year at Milford Academy in an effort to earn the SAT scores he needed for college.

== College career ==
Hollman played college football at the University of Toledo and first joined the team as a walk on. He played in 40 games totaling 113 tackles and 2 interceptions. Was a nominee for the Burlsworth Trophy awarded to the best player in the nation who started his career as a walk on.

== Professional career ==
Pre-draft measurables
| Height | Weight | Arm length | Hand span | 40-yard dash | 10-yard split | 20-yard split | 20-yard shuttle | Three-cone drill | Vertical jump | Broad jump | Bench press |
|---|---|---|---|---|---|---|---|---|---|---|---|
| 5 ft 11 3/4 in (1.82 m) | 196 lb (89 kg) | 31 in (0.79 m) | 9 in (0.23 m) | 4.38 s | 1.56 s | 2.60 s | 4.23 s | 6.81 s | 38.5 in (0.98 m) | 9 ft 11 in (3.02 m) | 18 reps |
All values from Pro Day

=== Green Bay Packers ===
Hollman was drafted by the Green Bay Packers in the sixth round (185th overall) of the 2019 NFL draft. On May 3, 2019, he signed his rookie contract with the Packers.

=== Houston Texans (first stint) ===
On August 23, 2021, Hollman was traded to the Houston Texans for a 2022 seventh round pick. He was waived on August 31, 2021.

=== New Orleans Saints ===
On September 6, 2021, Hollman was signed to the practice squad of the New Orleans Saints. He was released on September 28.

=== New York Giants ===
On October 5, 2021, Hollman was signed to the New York Giants practice squad. On December 7, 2021, Hollman was placed on practice squad/injured list.

=== San Francisco 49ers (first stint) ===
On February 2, 2022, Hollman signed a reserve/future contract with the San Francisco 49ers. He was waived on August 28, 2022.

=== Atlanta Falcons ===
On August 31, 2022, Hollman signed with the practice squad of the Atlanta Falcons. He was released on October 11.

=== San Francisco 49ers (second stint) ===
On October 18, 2022, Hollman was signed to the 49ers practice squad. He was released on November 29.

=== Miami Dolphins ===
On December 14, 2022, Hollman was signed to the Miami Dolphins practice squad.

=== Houston Texans (second stint) ===
On January 26, 2023, Hollman signed a reserve/future contract with the Texans. He was released on March 19, 2024.

=== Baltimore Ravens ===
On March 22, 2024, Hollman signed with the Baltimore Ravens. He was released on August 27, and re-signed to the practice squad.

=== Houston Texans (third stint) ===
On October 8, 2024, Hollman was signed by the Houston Texans off the Ravens practice squad.

== NFL career statistics ==
=== Regular season ===
| Year | Team | Games | | Tackles | | | | | Interceptions | | | | | | Fumbles | |
| Year | Team | GP | GS | Comb | Total | Ast | Sck | Sfty | PD | Int | Yds | Avg | Lng | TDs | FF | FR |
|---|---|---|---|---|---|---|---|---|---|---|---|---|---|---|---|---|
| 2019 | GB | 4 | 0 | 0 | 0 | 0 | 0.0 | 0 | 0 | 0 | 0 | 0.0 | 0 | 0 | 0 | 0 |
| 2020 | GB | 14 | 1 | 10 | 7 | 3 | 0.0 | 0 | 3 | 0 | 0 | 0 | 0 | 0 | 0 | 0 |
| Career | | 18 | 1 | 10 | 7 | 3 | 0.0 | 0 | 3 | 0 | 0 | 0 | 0 | 0 | 0 | 0 |
Source: NFL.com
