= Kevin Baggett =

American basketball player and coach

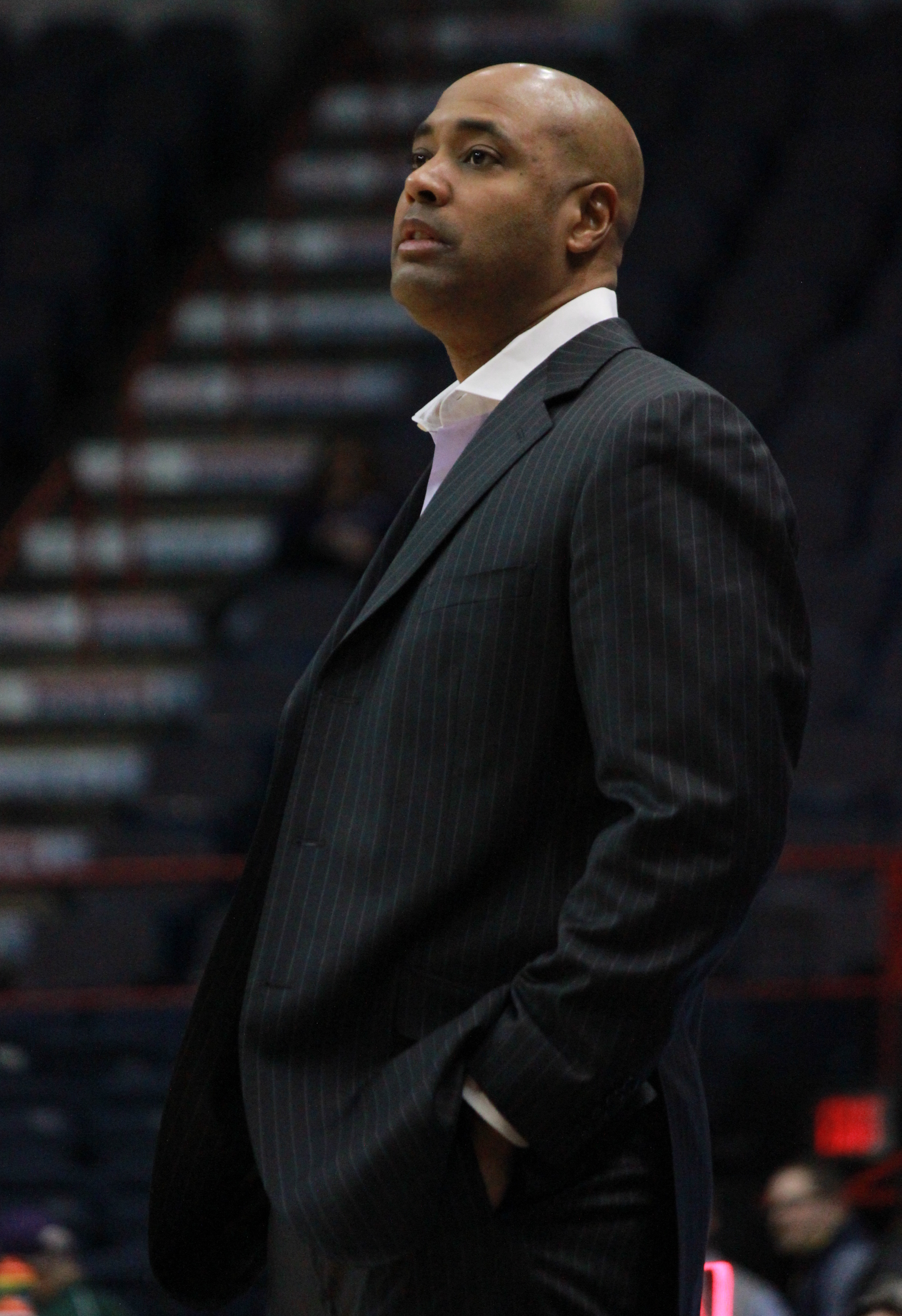

Current position
- Title: Head coach
- Team: Rider
- Conference: MAAC
- Record: 212–232 (.477)

Biographical details
- Born: May 3, 1966 (age 60)

Playing career
- 1985–1989: Saint Joseph's

Coaching career (HC unless noted)
- 1996–1998: James Madison (assistant)
- 1998–2000: Western Kentucky (assistant)
- 2000–2002: Howard (assistant)
- 2002–2004: Coastal Carolina (assistant)
- 2004–2006: UMBC (assistant)
- 2006–2008: Rider (assistant)
- 2008–2012: Rider (assoc. HC)
- 2012–present: Rider

Head coaching record
- Overall: 212–232 (.477)
- Tournaments: 0–1 (NIT); 0–1 (CBI); 1–1 (CIT)

Accomplishments and honors

Championships
- MAAC regular season (2018)

Awards
- 2× MAAC Coach of the Year (2015, 2018)

Kevin Baggett (born May 3, 1966) is the current college basketball head coach for Rider University. He was promoted to his current position on May 12, 2012, following six years as an assistant and associate head coach at the school.

Raised in Burlington Township, New Jersey, Baggett graduated in 1985 from Burlington Township High School.

== Head coaching record ==
Record table
Season	Team	Overall	Conference	Standing	Postseason
Rider Broncs (Metro Atlantic Athletic Conference) (2012–2026)
2012–13	Rider	19–15	12–6	T–2nd	CIT Second Round
2013–14	Rider	14–17	9–11	T–6th	
2014–15	Rider	21–12	15–5	2nd	CBI First Round
2015–16	Rider	13–20	8–12	T–7th	
2016–17	Rider	18–15	10–10	T–6th	
2017–18	Rider	22–10	15–3	T–1st	NIT First Round
2018–19	Rider	16–15	11–7	T–2nd	
2019–20	Rider	18–12	12–8	T–3rd	No postseason held
2020–21	Rider	6–17	5–13	11th	
2021–22	Rider	14–19	8–12	T–7th	
2022–23	Rider	16–14	13–7	2nd	
2023–24	Rider	15–17	12–8	T–3rd	
2024–25	Rider	14–19	9–11	T–8th	
2025–26	Rider	4–25	3–17	13th	
Rider Broncs (Metro Conference) (2026–present)
2026–27	Rider	2–5	0–0		
Rider:		212–232 (.477)	142–130 (.522)		
Total:		212–232 (.477)			
National champion Postseason invitational champion Conference regular season champion Conference regular season and conference tournament champion Division regular season champion Division regular season and conference tournament champion Conference tournament champion
