= Silicone Soul =

Scottish house music production duo

- Also known as: Astrocats
- Origin: Glasgow, Scotland
- Genres: House music
- Years active: 1998-present
- Labels: Soma Quality Recordings; Darkroom Dubs
- Members: Craig Morrison, Graeme Reedie

Silicone Soul are a Scottish house music production duo from Glasgow. They have released five albums on Soma Quality Recordings, and manage their own record label called Darkroom Dubs. Their single release "Right On!" featuring Louise Claire Marshall entered various charts throughout Europe and reached number-one in the UK Dance Singles Chart in October 2001.

== Discography ==
=== Albums ===
- A Soul Thing (2000)
- Staring into Space (2005)
- Save Our Souls (2006)
- Silicone Soul (2009)
- The Soma 20 Remixes (2012)
