= Forrest Reid: A Portrait and a Study =

1953 book

- Author: Russell Burlingham
- Language: English
- Genre: Biography
- Publisher: Faber & Faber
- Publication date: January 1, 1953
- Pages: 259

Forrest Reid: A Portrait and a Study is the first biography of Irish novelist Forrest Reid (1875 - 1947), written by Russell Burlingham and published by Faber & Faber in 1953.
