= Rod Streater =

American football player (born 1988)

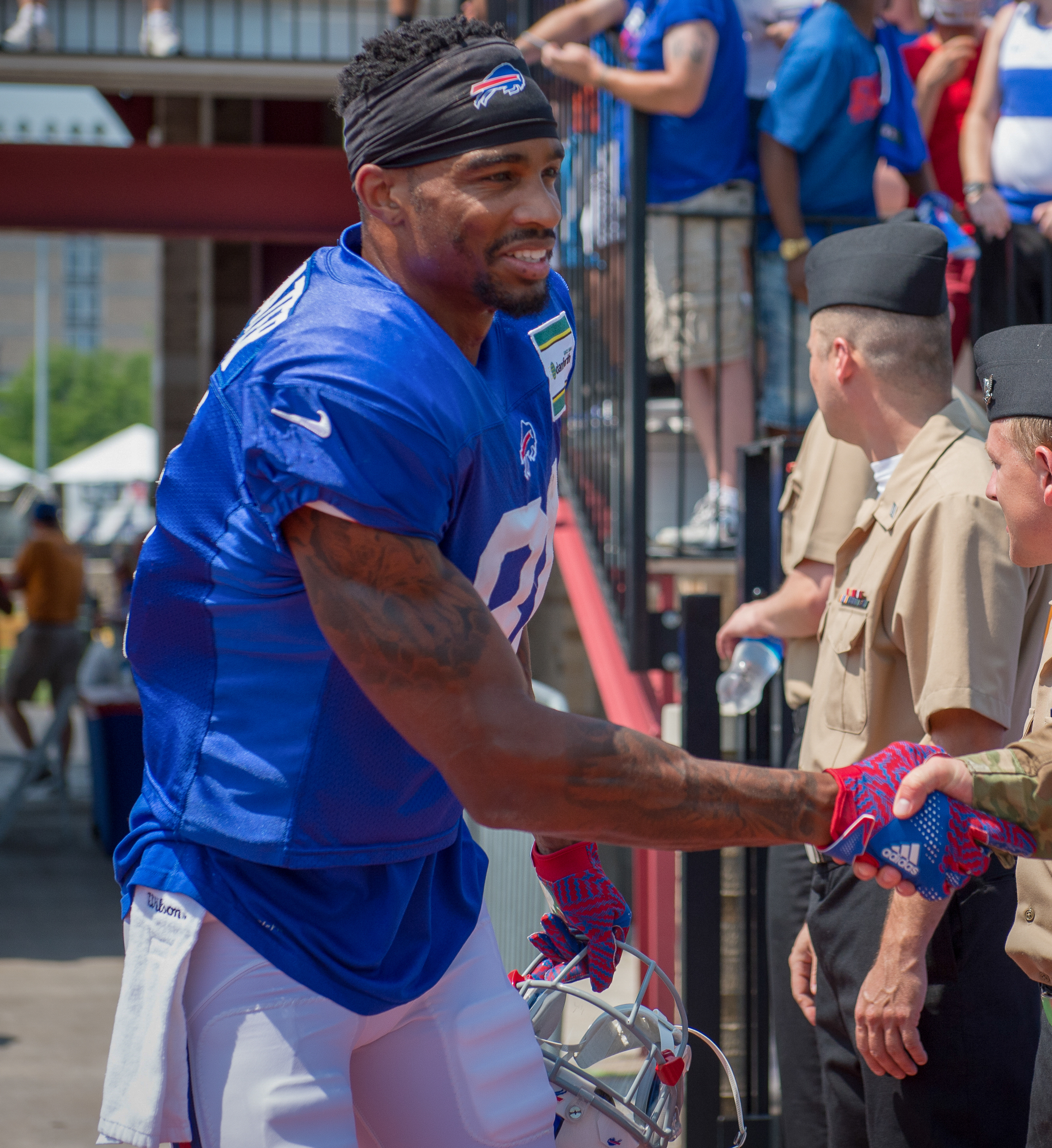
- Streater with the Buffalo Bills in 2018

No. 81, 80, 13
- Position: Wide receiver

Personal information
- Born: February 9, 1988 (age 38); Burlington, New Jersey, U.S.
- Listed height: 6 ft 2 in (1.88 m)
- Listed weight: 195 lb (88 kg)

Career information
- High school: Burlington Township (Burlington Township, New Jersey)
- College: Alfred State (2008–2009); Temple (2010–2011)
- NFL draft: 2012: undrafted

Career history

Playing
- Oakland Raiders (2012–2015); Kansas City Chiefs (2016)*; San Francisco 49ers (2016); Buffalo Bills (2017–2018)*; Cleveland Browns (2018)
- * Offseason or practice squad member only

Operations
- Cleveland Browns (2019–2020) Scouting intern; Cleveland Browns (2020–2021) Scouting assistant

Career NFL statistics
- Receptions: 127
- Receiving yards: 1,755
- Receiving touchdowns: 10
- Stats at Pro Football Reference

Rod William Streater (born February 9, 1988) is an American former professional football player who was a wide receiver in the National Football League (NFL). He played college football for the Temple Owls. He signed with the Oakland Raiders as an undrafted free agent in 2012 and has also had stints with the Kansas City Chiefs, San Francisco 49ers, Buffalo Bills, and Cleveland Browns. Streater became a scout for the Browns in 2019.

== Early life ==
Streater grew up in Burlington Township, New Jersey where he played high school football for the Falcons at Burlington Township High School.

== College career ==
Streater played junior college football at Alfred State College (before the technical school transitioned to the NCAA level), then transferred to Temple University. In his first season at Temple, Streater caught 30 receptions for 481 yards and four touchdowns. In his senior season, playing in an almost exclusively run-based offense, Streater had 19 receptions for 401 receiving yards and four receiving touchdowns. Temple won its first bowl game since 1979 during Streater's senior campaign.

== Professional career ==
=== Oakland Raiders ===
After going undrafted in the 2012 NFL draft, Streater then signed with the Oakland Raiders as an undrafted free agent. He was in the starting lineup for the Raiders on Monday Night Football against the San Diego Chargers to open the 2012 NFL season. Streater made his first NFL reception in the first quarter, a catch of a Carson Palmer pass, and fumbled at the end of the play. Despite the way he entered the league, Streater finished fourth on the team with 584 receiving yards on 39 receptions and three touchdowns.

In 2013, Streater had an excellent second season, with 60 catches for 888 yards and four touchdowns. He had a career-long 66-yard reception against the Philadelphia Eagles in Week 9.

In the 2014 season, Streater only played in the first three games due to a foot injury. He recorded nine receptions for 84 yards and a touchdown on the year.

In the 2015 season, Strater only appeared in one game and had an eight-yard reception.

=== Kansas City Chiefs ===
On March 12, 2016, Streater signed a one-year, $4.8 million contract with the Kansas City Chiefs.

=== San Francisco 49ers ===
On September 3, 2016, Streater and a conditional seventh-round draft pick were traded to the 49ers for a conditional seventh-round draft pick. He played in all 16 games with two starts, recording 18 receptions for 191 yards and two touchdowns.

=== Buffalo Bills ===
On May 24, 2017, Streater signed with the Buffalo Bills. He was released on September 2. Streater signed a reserve/future contract with the Bills on January 1, 2018.

On September 1, 2018, Streater was released by the Bills.

=== Cleveland Browns ===
Streater was signed by the Cleveland Browns on September 17, 2018. Streater was placed on injured reserve on October 16 after sustaining a season-ending neck injury during a game in Week 6.

== Executive career ==
=== Cleveland Browns ===
Streater remained with the Browns after his departure from the active roster. In 2019, he completed an internship with the team and joined the scouting department in 2020 as an assistant.

=== Philadelphia Eagles ===
On June 3, 2022, the Philadelphia Eagles hired Streater as a northeast area scout. On July 27, 2025, Streater was named as the team's west coast area scout.

== Personal life ==
Streater is an avid chess player, having learned it from his father and uncle when he was five years old. He frequently played against teammate Amari Cooper. Streater was invited to Chess.com's BlitzChamps tournament, a rapid tournament for NFL players.
