= Burlington Township High School =

Public secondary school in Burlington County, New Jersey, United States

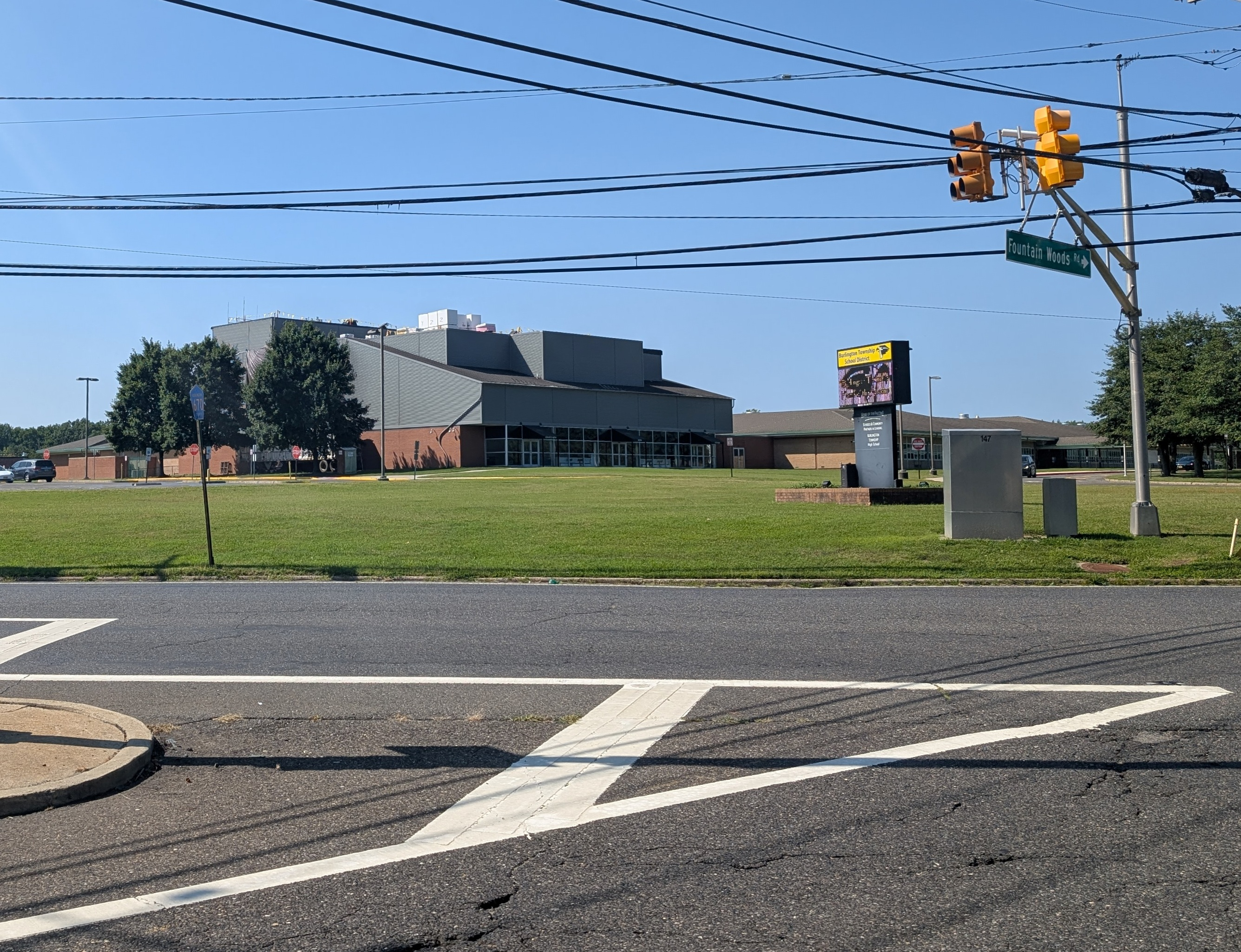

Location
- 610 Fountain Avenue; Burlington Township, Burlington County, New Jersey 08016; United States; 40.0641°N 74.8354°W

Information
- Type: Public high school
- Established: 1964
- School district: Burlington Township School District
- NCES School ID: 340246001004
- Principal: Phil Brownridge
- Faculty: 99.7 FTEs
- Grades: 9–12
- Enrollment: 1,118 (as of 2024–25)
- Student to teacher ratio: 11.2:1
- Colors: Black; Old Gold; White
- Athletics conference: Burlington County Scholastic League
- Team name: Falcons
- Rival: Burlington City High School, Delran High School, Florence Township Memorial High School
- Website: hs.burltwpsch.org

Burlington Township High School is a four-year comprehensive public high school that serves students in ninth through twelfth grades from Burlington Township in Burlington County, in the U.S. state of New Jersey, operating as the lone secondary school of the Burlington Township School District.

As of the 2024–25 school year, the school had an enrollment of 1,118 students and 99.7 classroom teachers (on an FTE basis), for a student–teacher ratio of 11.2:1. There were 291 students (26.0% of enrollment) eligible for free lunch and 61 (5.5% of students) eligible for reduced-cost lunch.

== History ==
The school was designed by Frederic P. Wiedersum Associates in 1963 with a staged approach under which the building would have a capacity of 694 when first constructed that could expand to 1,267 when all three stages were completed. The school opened for the 1964-65 school year, with initial portion completed at a cost of $1.6 million (equivalent to $16.6 million in 2025), with students shifted over from Burlington City High School.

== Awards, recognition and rankings ==
The school was the 178th-ranked public high school in New Jersey out of 339 schools statewide in New Jersey Monthly magazine's September 2014 cover story on the state's "Top Public High Schools", using a new ranking methodology. The school had been ranked 203rd in the state of 328 schools in 2012, after being ranked 153rd in 2010 out of 322 schools listed. The magazine ranked the school 140th in 2008 out of 316 schools. The school was ranked 138th in the magazine's September 2006 issue, which surveyed 316 schools across the state. Schooldigger.com ranked the school as 186th out of 376 public high schools statewide in its 2010 rankings (a decrease of 6 positions from the 2009 rank) which were based on the combined percentage of students classified as proficient or above proficient on the language arts literacy and mathematics components of the High School Proficiency Assessment (HSPA).

== Athletics ==
The Burlington Township High School Falcons compete in the Burlington County Scholastic League, which is comprised of public and private high schools in the Burlington County area, operating under the supervision of the New Jersey State Interscholastic Athletic Association (NJSIAA). With 880 students in grades 10–12, the school was classified by the NJSIAA for the 2022–24 school years as Group III Central for most athletic competition purposes. The football team competes in the Liberty Division of the 94-team West Jersey Football League superconference and was classified by the NJSIAA as Group III South for football for 2024–2026, which included schools with 695 to 882 students. Township and student population have drastically increased within the past decade. The school, during the first seven years of competition in the Burlington County League, was considered a "Group I" then "Group II" category.

The school's main rivals are Burlington City High School, Delran High School and Florence Township Memorial High School.

The boys basketball team won the Group I state championship in 1985 (vs. Bogota High School in the tournament final), 1987 (vs. Newark Tech High School) and 1992 (vs. Newark Tech). The 1985 team finished the season with a record of 31-0 after defeating Bogota by a score of 66–52 in the Group I championship game at the Brendan Byrne Arena. The 1992 team won the Group I title with a 79–61 win in the championship game at Rutgers University against Newark Tech. The 2010-11 team won the Central Jersey Group III sectional championship with a 70–64 win over Colts Neck High School, overcoming a deficit of 13 points in the fourth quarter. The 2011 sectional title was the program's tenth overall and its first since 1992.

The football team won the South Jersey Group I state sectional championships in 1976 and 1977. The BTHS football team had won two consecutive Patriot Division titles and were moved up to the Liberty Division, where they pulled through the 2006–07 season with a 1–7 record. The first two games of the 06–07 season were forfeited due to an ineligible running back, overturning two games the team had won.

The 1985 softball team finished the season with a 16–5 record after they defeated Saddle Brook High School by a score of 13–12 in extra innings in the final of the playoffs to win the Group I state championship in a game in which Saddle Brook led 7-0 after two innings, then Burlington Township pulled ahead 12-7 before Saddle Brook tied the game in the seventh inning.

The boys track team won the spring / outdoor track state championship in Group I in 1996.

The girls basketball team won the Group I state championship in 1997, defeating Cresskill High School in the final game of the tournament.

The 2011 boys soccer team won the BCSL Liberty Division for the first time in school history with a 7-1-2 record; the title was also the first in the boys soccer program's history.

The BTHS boys bowling team won the BCSL division championship with an 11-1 division record, and went 14-5 overall, and repeated as division champion in 2012.

The field hockey team won the Central Jersey Group III state sectional championship in 2019. In 2019, the team defeated Brick Township High School by a score of 5–0 in the final of the Central Jersey Group III tournament to win the program's first sectional title.

== Allegations of religious intolerance ==
On March 22, 2007, Burlington Township High School scheduled a simulated Columbine-like school shooting, lockdown and evacuation where Burlington Township Police detectives posed as Christian fundamentalists who became angry (when a student was expelled for praying before class) and began shooting students in order to "seek justice".

In response to the news coverage, the Burlington Township School District issued an official statement saying:

"Any perceived insensitivities to our religious community as a result of the emergency exercise are regrettable. It was certainly not the intent to portray any group in a negative manner. We cherish, respect, and celebrate the diversity of cultures and faith that exist within our community." The district respected the right of students and faculty to pray on school grounds.

== Administration ==
The school's principal is Phil Brownridge. His core administration team includes three vice principals.

== Notable alumni ==
- Kevin Baggett (born 1966, class of 1985), head coach of the Rider Broncs men's basketball team
- Thomas P. Foy (1951–2004), attorney and politician who served in both houses of the New Jersey Legislature representing the 7th Legislative District
- Ka'dar Hollman (born 1996, class of 2013), defensive back who played in the NFL the Green Bay Packers
- Eric Rogers (born 2002), professional football cornerback who plays in the NFL for the Los Angeles Chargers
- Rod Streater (born 1988), wide receiver for Temple University and the Cleveland Browns
- Bryan Warrick (born 1959, class of 1978), former professional basketball player who played five seasons in the NBA

== Notable faculty ==
- Kenneth William Faulkner (born 1947), former boys' basketball coach who led the team to a 521–129 record and NJSIAA Group I state championships in 1985, 1987 and 1992
