= Burlington Township, New Jersey =

Township in Burlington County, New Jersey, US

- Township
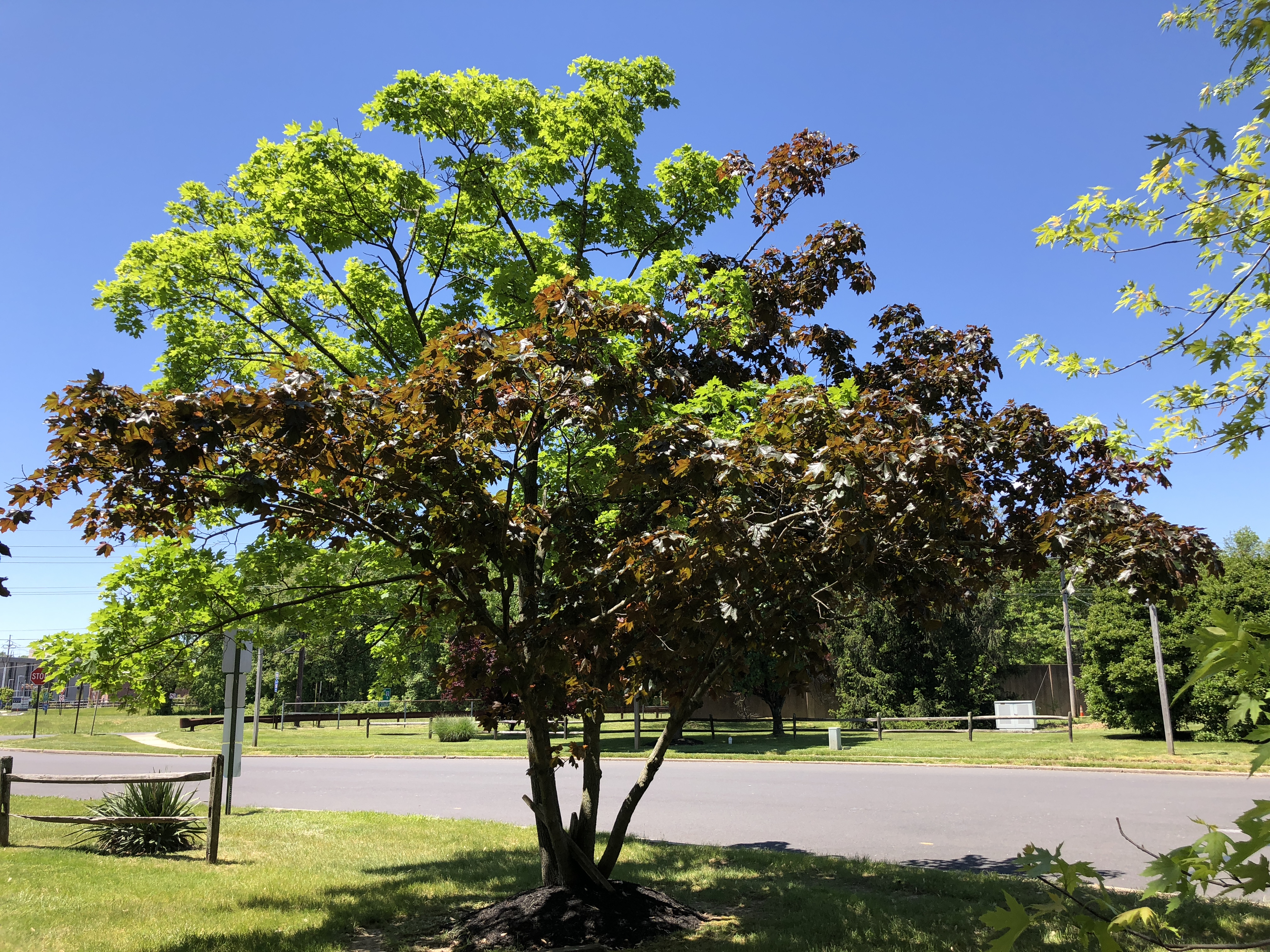
- The Crimson King Norway maple tree on County Route 541 in Burlington Township

- Coat of arms
- Nickname: "Acres of Opportunity"
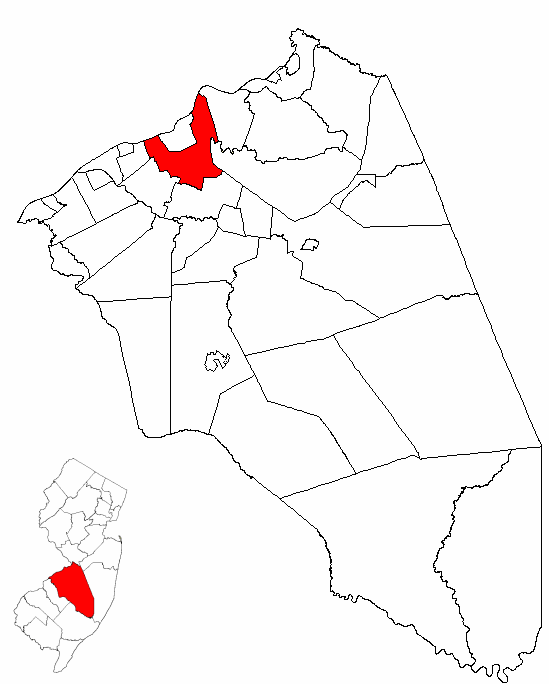
- Location of Burlington Township in Burlington County highlighted in red (right). Inset map: Location of Burlington County in New Jersey highlighted in red (left).

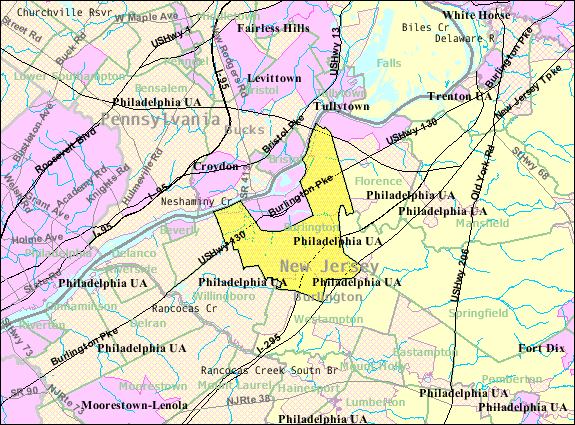
- Census Bureau map of Burlington Township, New Jersey

- Location in Burlington County Location in New Jersey Location in the United States
- Coordinates: 40.060631°N 74.835891°W
- Country: United States
- State: New Jersey
- County: Burlington
- Incorporated: February 21, 1798
- Named for: Bridlington, England

Government
  - Type: Faulkner Act (mayor–council)
  - Body: Township Council
  - Mayor: E.L. "Pete" Green (D, term ends December 31, 2026)
  - Administrator: Jodi M. Botlinger
  - Municipal clerk: Mary E. Field

Area
  - Total: 14.02 sq mi (36.32 km^{2})
  - Land: 13.45 sq mi (34.83 km^{2})
  - Water: 0.58 sq mi (1.49 km^{2}) 4.10%
  - Rank: 178th of 565 in state 17th of 40 in county
- Elevation: 26 ft (7.9 m)

Population (2020)
  - Total: 23,983
  - Estimate (2023): 24,108
  - Rank: 111th of 565 in state 6th of 40 in county
  - Density: 1,779.7/sq mi (687.1/km^{2})
  - Rank: 309th of 565 in state 18th of 40 in county
- Time zone: UTC−05:00 (Eastern (EST))
  - Summer (DST): UTC−04:00 (Eastern (EDT))
- ZIP Code: 08016
- Area code: 609
- FIPS code: 3400508950
- GNIS feature ID: 0882102
- Website: www.twp.burlington.nj.us

Burlington Township is a township in Burlington County, in the U.S. state of New Jersey. It is a suburb of Philadelphia and is part of the South Jersey region of the state. As of the 2020 United States census, the township's population was 23,983, its highest decennial count ever and an increase of 1,389 (+6.1%) from the 2010 census count of 22,594, which in turn reflected an increase of 2,300 (+11.3%) from the 20,294 counted in the 2000 census. The township, and all of Burlington County, is a part of the Philadelphia metropolitan area.

== History ==
Burlington was formed as a towne by the West Jersey proprietors and was interrelated to Burlington City during its early days. It was incorporated on February 21, 1798 by the Township Act of 1798, enacted by the New Jersey Legislature, as one of the initial group of 104 townships incorporated in New Jersey. Burlington City was reincorporated within the township as of March 14, 1851, at which time a portion of the township was annexed to the city. The township's name is a corruption of the English town of Bridlington.

== Geography ==
According to the U.S. Census Bureau, Burlington township had a total area of 14.02 square miles (36.32 km^{2}), including 13.45 square miles (34.83 km^{2}) of land and 0.58 square miles (1.49 km^{2}) of water (4.10%). Unincorporated communities, localities and place names located partially or completely within the township include Deacons, Fountain Woods, Springside and Stevens.

The township borders Burlington City, Edgewater Park, Florence Township, Springfield Township, Westampton Township and Willingboro Township in Burlington County; and both Bristol and Bristol Township across the Delaware River in Pennsylvania.

== Demographics ==
Historical population
Census	Pop.	Note	%±
1800	2,009		—
1810	2,419		20.4%
1820	2,758		14.0%
1830	2,670		−3.2%
1840	3,434		28.6%
1850	863	*	−74.9%
1860	876		1.5%
1870	1,025		17.0%
1880	1,147		11.9%
1890	958		−16.5%
1900	1,061		10.8%
1910	1,220		15.0%
1920	1,520		24.6%
1930	2,587		70.2%
1940	2,520		−2.6%
1950	3,441		36.5%
1960	6,291		82.8%
1970	10,621		68.8%
1980	11,527		8.5%
1990	12,454		8.0%
2000	20,294		63.0%
2010	22,594		11.3%
2020	23,983		6.1%
2023 (est.)	24,108		0.5%
Population sources: 1800–2000; 1800–1920 1840; 1850 1870 1880–1890; 1890–1910 1910–1930; 1940–2000 2000; 2010 2020 * = Lost territory in previous decade

=== 2010 census ===
The 2010 United States census counted 22,594 people, 7,797 households, and 5,746 families in the township. The population density was 1,684.2 per square mile (650.3/km^{2}). There were 8,105 housing units at an average density of 604.2 per square mile (233.3/km^{2}). The racial makeup was 59.00% (13,331) White, 27.98% (6,322) Black or African American, 0.15% (35) Native American, 7.04% (1,590) Asian, 0.04% (9) Pacific Islander, 2.41% (544) from other races, and 3.38% (763) from two or more races. Hispanic or Latino of any race were 7.05% (1,593) of the population.

Of the 7,797 households, 39.1% had children under the age of 18; 57.2% were married couples living together; 12.1% had a female householder with no husband present and 26.3% were non-families. Of all households, 21.6% were made up of individuals and 7.4% had someone living alone who was 65 years of age or older. The average household size was 2.81 and the average family size was 3.32.

26.7% of the population were under the age of 18, 7.1% from 18 to 24, 25.6% from 25 to 44, 28.5% from 45 to 64, and 12.0% who were 65 years of age or older. The median age was 39.6 years. For every 100 females, the population had 90.4 males. For every 100 females ages 18 and older there were 88.1 males.

The Census Bureau's 2006–2010 American Community Survey showed that (in 2010 inflation-adjusted dollars) median household income was $83,291 (with a margin of error of +/− $4,419) and the median family income was $101,967 (+/− $6,626). Males had a median income of $60,587 (+/− $3,161) versus $50,078 (+/− $3,792) for females. The per capita income for the borough was $32,122 (+/− $1,352). About 3.0% of families and 5.6% of the population were below the poverty line, including 5.2% of those under age 18 and 6.9% of those age 65 or over.

=== 2000 census ===
As of the 2000 census, there were 20,294 people, 7,112 households, and 5,277 families residing in the township. The population density was 1,506.2 inhabitants per square mile (581.5/km^{2}). There were 7,348 housing units at an average density of 545.4 per square mile (210.6/km^{2}). The racial makeup of the township was 67.71% White, 24.49% African American, 0.16% Native American, 3.73% Asian, 0.03% Pacific Islander, 1.46% from other races, and 2.41% from two or more races. Hispanic or Latino of any race were 4.01% of the population.

There were 7,112 households, out of which 40.1% had children under the age of 18 living with them, 59.0% were married couples living together, 11.2% had a female householder with no husband present, and 25.8% were non-families. 21.4% of all households were made up of individuals, and 6.4% had someone living alone who was 65 years of age or older. The average household size was 2.72 and the average family size was 3.18.

In the township, the population was spread out, with 27.2% under the age of 18, 5.6% from 18 to 24, 35.4% from 25 to 44, 19.2% from 45 to 64, and 12.6% who were 65 years of age or older. The median age was 36 years. For every 100 females, there were 90.1 males. For every 100 females age 18 and over, there were 86.1 males.

The median income for a household in the township was $61,663, and the median income for a family was $70,958. Males had a median income of $49,290 versus $35,510 for females. The per capita income for the township was $24,754. About 3.4% of families and 5.0% of the population were below the poverty line, including 4.7% of those under age 18 and 7.5% of those age 65 or over.

== Economy ==
Burlington Coat Factory has its headquarters in the township, having relocated from Burlington City in 1988.

The Marketplace at Burlington, formerly an indoor mall known as the Burlington Center Mall, offered a gross leasable area of 670,000 square feet (62,000 m^{2}), with plans to convert to an open-air format with 1,500,000 square feet (140,000 m^{2}) of leasable space. The mall closed its doors on January 8, 2018, though Sears remained while the rest of the mall was closed because it owned a section of mall property. Sears closed on September 2, 2018. It has since been torn down and distribution warehouses have replaced it.

The township's businesses and shopping destinations cause the daytime population to rise to as much as 35,000, a jump of 50% from the resident population of almost 23,000.

== Government ==
=== Local government ===
Burlington Township is governed within the Faulkner Act, formally known as the Optional Municipal Charter Law, under the Mayor-Council (Plan E) form of municipal government, implemented based on the recommendations of a Charter Study Commission as of January 1, 1975. The township is one of 71 municipalities (of the 564) statewide that use this form of government. The governing body is comprised of the Mayor and the seven-member Township Council, all of whom are elected at-large in partisan elections to four-year terms in office on a staggered basis as part of the November general election. Either three or four council seats are up for vote in even-numbered years, with the mayoral seat up for vote during the same election where three council seats are on the ballot.

As of 2024, the Mayor of Burlington Township is Democrat E.L. "Pete" Green, who was appointed to serve an unexpired term of office ending December 31, 2026. Members of the Burlington Township Council are Council President Robert W. Jung (D, 2024), President Pro Tem Prabhdeep "Pavi" Pandher (D, 2024; elected to fill an unexpired term), Daniel Carducci (D, 2026), Joyce R. Howell (D, 2026), George M. Kozub (D, 2026), Carl M. Schoenborn (D, 2024) and Patricia "Trish" Siboczy (D, 2024).

In December 2021, the Township Council appointed Daniel Carducci to fill the seat expiring in December 2022 that became vacant following the resignation of Michael K. Cantwell earlier that month. In January 2022, the Township Council appointed E.L. "Pete" Green to fill the mayoral seat expiring in December 2022 that had been held by Brian J. Carlin until he resigned from office the previous month to take a seat as the Burlington County Surrogate, while Prabhdeep "Pavi" Pandher was appointed to fill Green's Township Council seat expiring in 2024. Pandher served on an interim basis until the November 2022 general election, when he was elected to serve the balance of the term of office.

=== Federal, state, and county representation ===
Burlington Township is located in the 3rd Congressional District and is part of New Jersey's 7th state legislative district.

For the 119th United States Congress, New Jersey's 3rd congressional district is currently represented Herb Conaway (D, Delran Township). New Jersey is represented in the United States Senate by Democrats Cory Booker (Newark, term ends 2027) and Andy Kim (Moorestown, term ends 2031).

For the 2026–2027 session, the 7th legislative district of the New Jersey Legislature is represented in the State Senate by Troy Singleton (D, Palmyra) and in the General Assembly by Carol A. Murphy (D, Mount Laurel) and Balvir Singh (D, Burlington Township).

Burlington County is governed by a Board of County Commissioners comprised of five members who are chosen at-large in partisan elections to serve three-year terms of office on a staggered basis, with either one or two seats coming up for election each year; at an annual reorganization meeting, the board selects a director and deputy director from among its members to serve a one-year term. As of 2026, Burlington County's Commissioners are: Director Felicia Hopson (D, Willingboro Township, term as commissioner ends December 31, 2027; term as director ends 2026), Deputy Director Allison Eckel (D, Medford, term as commissioner ends 2028; term as deputy director ends 2026), Randy Brolo (D, Lumberton, 2026; elected to an unexpired term), Tyler Burrell (D, Delran Township, 2027) and Tom Pullion (D, Edgewater Park, 2026).

Burlington County's constitutional officers are Clerk Joanne Schwartz (D, Southampton Township, 2028), Sheriff James H. Kostoplis (D, Bordentown, 2028) and Surrogate Brian J. Carlin (D, Burlington Township, 2026).

=== Politics ===
United States presidential election results for Burlington Township 2024 2020 2016 2012 2008 2004
Year	Republican		Democratic		Third party(ies)	
Year	No.	%	No.	%	No.	%
2024	3,392	30.66%	7,528	68.05%	143	1.29%
2020	4,070	30.06%	9,292	68.64%	176	1.30%
2016	3,517	31.58%	7,297	65.53%	322	2.89%
2012	3,229	30.24%	7,345	68.79%	103	0.96%
2008	3,692	33.39%	7,266	65.71%	99	0.90%
2004	4,086	41.47%	5,696	57.80%	72	0.73%

As of March 2011, there were a total of 13,214 registered voters in Burlington Township, of which 5,382 (40.7% vs. 33.3% countywide) were registered as Democrats, 2,160 (16.3% vs. 23.9%) were registered as Republicans and 5,664 (42.9% vs. 42.8%) were registered as Unaffiliated. There were 8 voters registered as Libertarians or Greens. Among the township's 2010 Census population, 58.5% (vs. 61.7% in Burlington County) were registered to vote, including 79.8% of those ages 18 and over (vs. 80.3% countywide).

In the 2012 presidential election, Democrat Barack Obama received 7,345 votes (68.4% vs. 58.1% countywide), ahead of Republican Mitt Romney with 3,229 votes (30.1% vs. 40.2%) and other candidates with 103 votes (1.0% vs. 1.0%), among the 10,744 ballots cast by the township's 14,146 registered voters, for a turnout of 76.0% (vs. 74.5% in Burlington County). In the 2008 presidential election, Democrat Barack Obama received 7,266 votes (65.3% vs. 58.4% countywide), ahead of Republican John McCain with 3,692 votes (33.2% vs. 39.9%) and other candidates with 99 votes (0.9% vs. 1.0%), among the 11,127 ballots cast by the township's 13,570 registered voters, for a turnout of 82.0% (vs. 80.0% in Burlington County). In the 2004 presidential election, Democrat John Kerry received 5,696 votes (57.4% vs. 52.9% countywide), ahead of Republican George W. Bush with 4,086 votes (41.1% vs. 46.0%) and other candidates with 72 votes (0.7% vs. 0.8%), among the 9,931 ballots cast by the township's 12,351 registered voters, for a turnout of 80.4% (vs. 78.8% in the whole county).

Gubernatorial election results for Burlington Township
Year	Republican		Democratic		Third party(ies)	
Year	No.	%	No.	%	No.	%
2025	2,661	27.56%	6,936	71.85%	57	0.59%
2021	2,689	35.66%	4,804	63.71%	47	0.62%
2017	2,001	30.84%	4,392	67.68%	96	1.48%
2013	3,486	54.16%	2,874	44.66%	76	1.18%
2009	2,669	40.90%	3,483	53.38%	373	5.72%
2005	2,355	38.21%	3,535	57.35%	274	4.45%

In the 2013 gubernatorial election, Republican Chris Christie received 3,486 votes (53.1% vs. 61.4% countywide), ahead of Democrat Barbara Buono with 2,874 votes (43.7% vs. 35.8%) and other candidates with 76 votes (1.2% vs. 1.2%), among the 6,570 ballots cast by the township's 14,162 registered voters, yielding a 46.4% turnout (vs. 44.5% in the county). In the 2009 gubernatorial election, Democrat Jon Corzine received 3,483 ballots cast (52.9% vs. 44.5% countywide), ahead of Republican Chris Christie with 2,669 votes (40.6% vs. 47.7%), Independent Chris Daggett with 283 votes (4.3% vs. 4.8%) and other candidates with 90 votes (1.4% vs. 1.2%), among the 6,578 ballots cast by the township's 13,512 registered voters, yielding a 48.7% turnout (vs. 44.9% in the county).

United States Senate election results for Burlington Township1
Year	Republican		Democratic		Third party(ies)	
Year	No.	%	No.	%	No.	%
2024	2,740	25.87%	7,658	72.31%	192	1.81%
2018	3,144	33.03%	5,809	61.02%	567	5.96%
2012	3,038	29.82%	7,073	69.42%	77	0.76%
2006	2,431	39.42%	3,601	58.39%	135	2.19%

United States Senate election results for Burlington Township2
Year	Republican		Democratic		Third party(ies)	
Year	No.	%	No.	%	No.	%
2020	3,914	29.65%	9,141	69.25%	145	1.10%
2014	1,874	31.45%	4,008	67.27%	76	1.28%
2013	1,244	31.81%	2,621	67.02%	46	1.18%
2008	3,413	34.09%	6,424	64.17%	174	1.74%

== Education ==
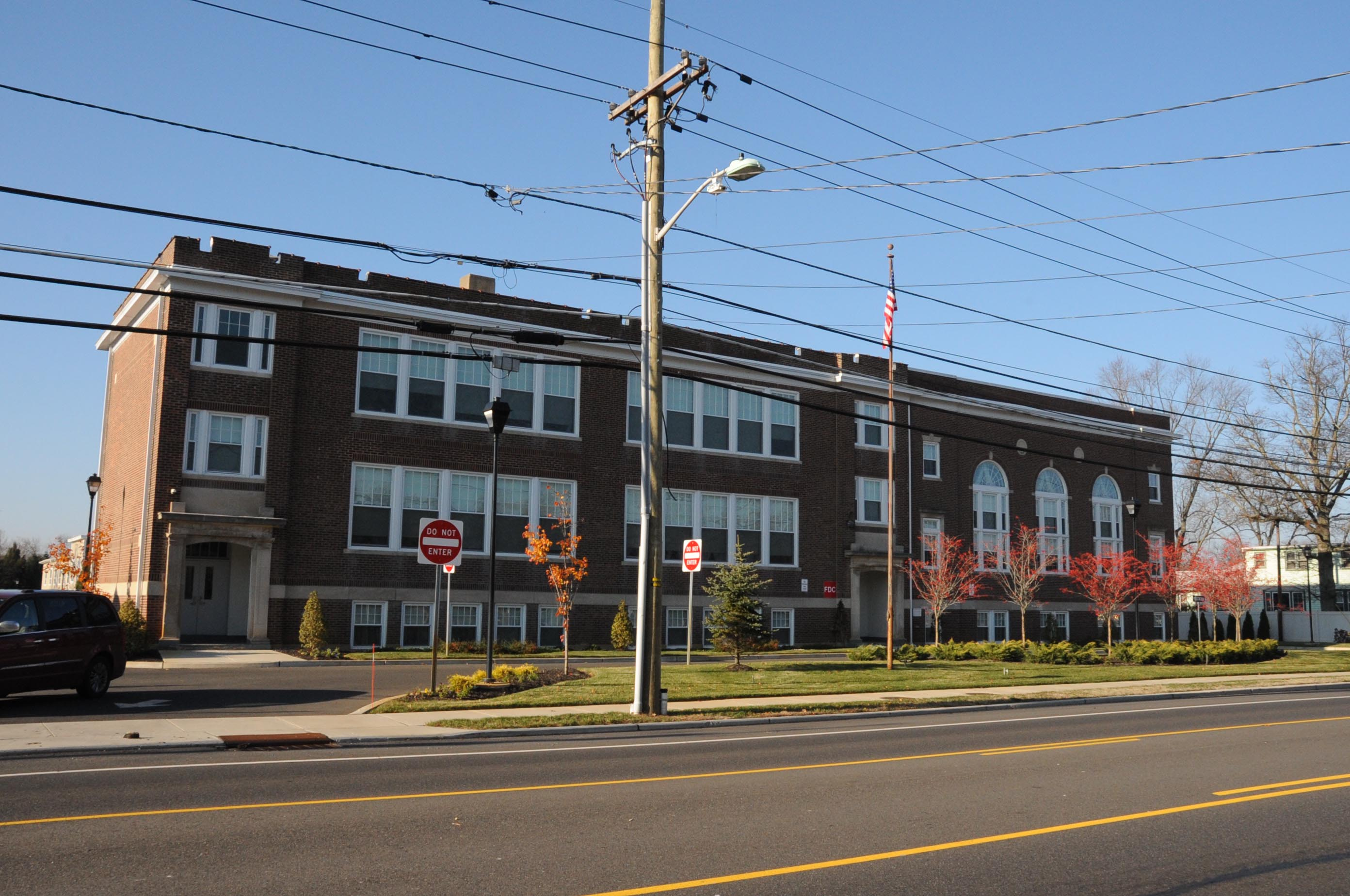
Springside Public School is listed on the National Register of Historic Places

Public school students in pre-kindergarten through twelfth grade are educated in the Burlington Township School District. As of the 2024–25 school year, the district, comprised of four schools, had an enrollment of 3,712 students and 321.3 classroom teachers (on an FTE basis), for a student–teacher ratio of 11.6:1. Schools in the district (with 2024–25 enrollment data from the National Center for Education Statistics) are B. Bernice Young Elementary School with 681 students in Pre-K to 1st grade, Fountain Woods Elementary School with 951 students in grades 2-5, Burlington Township Middle School at Springside with 822 students in grades 6-8 and Burlington Township High School. with 1,118 students in grades 9-12

Burlington Township School District received notice in 2009 after a video posted on YouTube by a parent without school approval showed more than a dozen children at B. Bernice Young Elementary School singing a song praising President Barack Obama, which Conservative groups cited as a means of indoctrinating students to support the President. At the conclusion of the song, the children pump their fists and chant "hip, hip, hooray!" The song had been performed in conjunction with Black History Month activities and when the author of the book I Am Barack Obama visited the school the next month

Students from Burlington Township, and from all of Burlington County, are eligible to attend the Burlington County Institute of Technology, a countywide public school district that serves the vocational and technical education needs of students at the high school and post-secondary level at its campuses in Medford and Westampton Township.

== Sports ==
In 2017, the 10U Cal Ripken baseball team from Burlington Township represented the Mid-Atlantic Region in the 10U Cal Ripken World Series, held in Hammond, Indiana.

== Transportation ==
=== Roads and highways ===
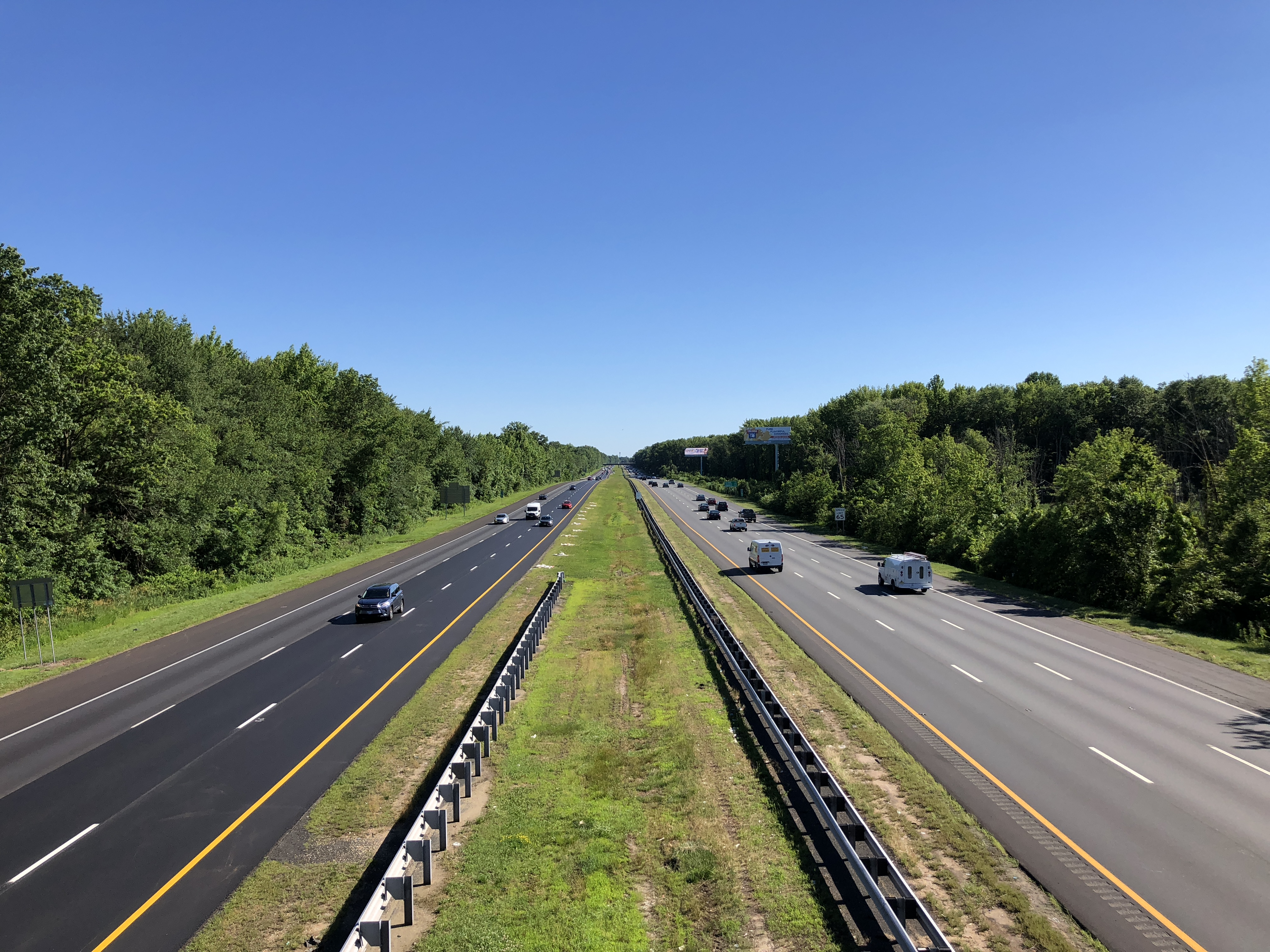
Interstate 295 southbound in Burlington Township

As of May 2010, the township had a total of 100.69 miles (162.04 km) of roadways, of which 78.65 miles (126.57 km) were maintained by the municipality, 15.03 miles (24.19 km) by Burlington County and 5.36 miles (8.63 km) by the New Jersey Department of Transportation and 1.65 miles (2.66 km) by the New Jersey Turnpike Authority.

The New Jersey Turnpike, including the Pennsylvania Extension (Interstate 95) and the Delaware River Bridge, pass through the township for 0.8 miles (1.3 km) from the river to Florence Township. While there is no turnpike interchange within the township's borders, it is accessible in neighboring Florence Township (at Exit 6A on the Pennsylvania Extension) and Westampton Township (at Interchange 5, which is signed for Burlington-Mount Holly).

Other roads that pass through Burlington Township include U.S. Route 130, Interstate 295, and County Road 541.

=== Public transportation ===
NJ Transit provides bus service in the city between Trenton and Philadelphia on the 409 route and between Burlington and Camden on the 413 and 419 routes.

The NJ Transit River Line light rail system provides transportation between the Trenton Transit Center in Trenton and the Walter Rand Transportation Center (and other stations) in Camden, with stops in Burlington City at Burlington South and Burlington Towne Centre, but not in Burlington Township itself.

== Notable people ==
People who were born in, residents of, or otherwise closely associated with Burlington Township include:

- Kevin Baggett (born 1966), head coach of the Rider University men's basketball team
- Breland (born 1995), country singer/songwriter
- Thomas P. Foy (1951–2004), member of the New Jersey General Assembly and New Jersey Senate whose start in politics was on the Burlington Township Council
- Peter Hill (1767–1820), former slave who was the first African American clockmaker
- Ka'dar Hollman (born 1994), American football cornerback who has played in the NFL for the Green Bay Packers
- Sybilla Righton Masters (c. 1676–1720), inventor who was the first person residing in the American colonies to be given an English patent, which was issued in 1715 in her husband's name, as women were not allowed to have their own patents
- Eric Rogers (born 2002), professional football cornerback who plays in the NFL for the Los Angeles Chargers
- Balvir Singh, politician who has represented the 7th Legislative District in the New Jersey General Assembly since 2025
- Rod Streater (born 1988), wide receiver who played in the NFL for the Cleveland Browns
- Bryan Warrick (born 1959), former professional basketball player who played five seasons in the NBA
