= Bryan Warrick =

American basketball player

Personal information
- Born: July 22, 1959 (age 67) Moses Lake, Washington, U.S.
- Listed height: 6 ft 5 in (1.96 m)
- Listed weight: 195 lb (88 kg)

Career information
- High school: Burlington Township (Burlington Township, New Jersey)
- College: Saint Joseph's (1978–1982)
- NBA draft: 1982: 2nd round, 25th overall pick
- Drafted by: Washington Bullets
- Playing career: 1982–1988
- Position: Point guard
- Number: 13, 12, 21

Career history
- 1982–1984: Washington Bullets
- 1984–1985: Los Angeles Clippers
- 1985: Milwaukee Bucks
- 1985–1986: Wisconsin Flyers
- 1986: Indiana Pacers
- 1986–1987: Rockford Lightning
- 1987–1988: BSC Saturn Köln

Career highlights
- CBA assists leader (1986)
- Stats at NBA.com
- Stats at Basketball Reference

Bryan Anthony Warrick (born July 22, 1959) is an American retired professional basketball player. He was a 6-foot-5-inch (196 cm) 218 pounds (99 kg) point guard and played collegiately at Saint Joseph's University where he was named to the East Coast Conference and Philadelphia Big 5 First Teams.

== Early life ==
Born in Moses Lake, Washington, Warrick was raised in Burlington Township, New Jersey. He played basketball and was a two-time prep champion as quarterback for the football team at Burlington Township High School.

== Career ==
Warrick was selected with the second pick of the second round in the 1982 NBA draft by the Washington Bullets. His NBA career, which lasted from 1982 to 1986, included stints with the Bullets, Los Angeles Clippers, Milwaukee Bucks, and Indiana Pacers.

== Personal life ==
Warrick is a resident of Mount Laurel, New Jersey.

== Career statistics ==
Legend
GP	Games played	GS	Games started	MPG	Minutes per game
FG%	Field goal percentage	3P%	3-point field goal percentage	FT%	Free throw percentage
RPG	Rebounds per game	APG	Assists per game	SPG	Steals per game
BPG	Blocks per game	PPG	Points per game	**Bold**	Career high

=== NBA ===
Year	Team	GP	GS	MPG	FG%	3P%	FT%	RPG	APG	SPG	BPG	PPG
1982–83	Washington	43	**20**	16.9	.380	.000	.737	1.6	2.9	0.5	**0.2**	4.0
1983–84	Washington	32	0	7.9	.409	.333	.500	0.7	1.3	0.3	0.1	2.0
1984–85	Los Angeles	**58**	1	12.3	**.491**	.250	.772	1.0	2.6	0.4	0.1	3.7
1985–86	Milwaukee	5	0	5.4	.400	**.500**	**1.000**	0.6	1.2	0.4	0.0	2.0
1985–86	Indiana	31	5	**21.2**	.471	.200	.791	**2.1**	**3.5**	**0.8**	0.1	**7.0**
Career		169	26	14.1	.443	.208	.747	1.3	2.6	0.5	0.1	4.0

=== College ===
Year	Team	GP	GS	MPG	FG%	3P%	FT%	RPG	APG	SPG	BPG	PPG
1978–79	St. Joseph's	24	–	9.0	.403	–	.667	1.0	0.8	0.5	0.1	3.3
1979–80	St. Joseph's	**30**	–	34.4	.473	–	.735	2.7	3.1	1.7	0.4	11.9
1980–81	St. Joseph's	29	–	33.3	.451	–	.683	2.7	3.0	1.9	0.3	13.5
1981–82	St. Joseph's	**30**	**30**	**35.2**	**.507**	–	**.776**	**3.2**	**5.0**	**2.1**	**0.5**	**14.9**
Career		113	30	29.0	.472	–	.730	2.5	3.1	1.6	0.3	11.3
