= Arthur Greeves =

British artist (1895–1966)

- Born: Joseph Arthur Greeves; 27 August 1895; Belfast, Ireland
- Died: 29 August 1966 (aged 71); Northern Ireland
- Education: Campbell College; Slade School of Fine Art
- Known for: Painting; lifelong best friend and correspondent of C. S. Lewis

Joseph Arthur Greeves (27 August 1895 – 29 August 1966) was a British artist from Belfast, best known as the lifelong best friend and principal correspondent of C. S. Lewis. Lewis described Greeves as "after my brother, my oldest and most intimate friend." Their friendship began in 1914 and continued until Lewis' death in 1963, producing one of the most important bodies of private correspondence in Lewis studies.

Greeves is also notable because he was a homosexual male, a fact identified and discussed by several Lewis biographers and scholars. Greeves came out as gay to Lewis in a May 1918 letter, after which Lewis responded with complete acceptance.

== Early life and family ==
Greeves was born in Belfast into a wealthy family connected with the linen industry. His family owned J. & T. M. Greeves & Co., a flax-spinning company, and lived directly across the street from the Lewis family in east Belfast. He was raised in a household connected with the Plymouth Brethren tradition.

Although Greeves and Lewis had known of each other as boys, their friendship began seriously in April 1914, when Lewis visited Greeves while Greeves was ill in bed. Lewis later recalled the meeting in Surprised by Joy, presenting Greeves as the first friend with whom he could share his private imaginative world.

== Education and artistic career ==
Greeves attended Campbell College in Belfast from 1906 to 1912. He later studied at the Slade School of Fine Art in London from 1921 to 1923, earning a certificate there.

As an artist, Greeves painted landscapes and portraits. His landscape paintings were exhibited in 1936 and received favorable notice from some contemporary critics. He also painted portraits of the Belfast novelist Forrest Reid.

== Friendship with C. S. Lewis ==
Greeves’s historical importance rests chiefly on his relationship with C. S. Lewis. Their friendship began in 1914, when Lewis was a teenager, and lasted nearly fifty years until Lewis' death. The correspondence between Lewis and Greeves was eventually published as They Stand Together: The Letters of C. S. Lewis to Arthur Greeves, 1914–1963, edited by Walter Hooper.

The collection contains Lewis’s surviving letters to Greeves across almost the whole of Lewis’s adult life and covers Lewis’s youth, reading habits, conversion, emotional life, and developing literary imagination. Scholars have repeatedly treated the Lewis–Greeves correspondence as essential evidence for Lewis’s personal development.

In the early letters, Lewis discussed books, myths, school life, religion, loneliness, and aesthetic experience. Lookadoo has argued that these letters anticipate features later associated with the Inklings, including literary companionship, criticism, imaginative exchange, and shared reading. Brenton D. G. Dickieson’s review of Joseph A. Kohm Jr.’s study likewise emphasizes the importance of Greeves for understanding Lewis’s lifelong practice of friendship.

Joseph A. Kohm Jr. argues that Greeves may properly be considered Lewis’s best friend because of the unusually long duration and emotional vulnerability of the friendship. Lepojärvi’s review of Kohm’s book describes They Stand Together as the central primary source for the subject.

== They Stand Together ==
They Stand Together: The Letters of C. S. Lewis to Arthur Greeves, 1914–1963 was published in 1979 and edited by Walter Hooper. The book gathers Lewis’s surviving letters to Greeves from before Lewis’s military service in the First World War through his later career as a Christian apologist, literary scholar, and author of fiction.

The letters reveal the depth of trust between the two men. Lewis used his correspondence with Greeves to discuss literature, grief, religious belief, academic work, friendship, and the imaginative life. The published letters are frequently used by Lewis scholars and biographers, including George Sayer, Alan Jacobs, Alister McGrath, and David C. Downing.

== Sexuality ==
Greeves has been described by several Lewis biographers and commentators as homosexual. Greeves lived in a period when male homosexuality was criminalized and stigmatized in Britain and Ireland, so surviving evidence of Greeves' sexual orientation comes largely from private correspondence, later recollections, and scholarly literature. Christopher’s article “What Was Arthur Greeves’ Sexual Orientation?” specifically examined the evidence and argued that Greeves’s sexuality is an important feature of the Lewis–Greeves relationship.

This subject has drawn attention because Lewis, despite his conservative Christian moral commitments, maintained an intimate friendship with Greeves for decades. Urban notes that Greeves is generally considered one of Lewis’s closest friends and discusses him in the context of Lewis’s complex relationship to gay literary scholarship and homosexuality.

== Role in Lewis scholarship ==
Greeves is central to Lewis scholarship because Lewis’s letters to him preserve unusually candid material about Lewis’s inner life. The correspondence documents Lewis’s adolescent imagination, reading life, early atheism, conversion to theism and Christianity, personal griefs, academic ambitions, and literary judgments.

Walter Hooper’s publication of the letters made Greeves visible as one of the indispensable witnesses to Lewis’s intellectual and spiritual life. Later scholarship has continued to emphasize that Greeves should not be treated merely as a peripheral friend, but as one of the major relationships of Lewis’s life.

== Later life and death ==
Greeves remained in Northern Ireland for much of his life. His chronic health problems, especially his heart condition, limited his public career, but he continued to paint, read, write, and correspond. He died in 1966, three years after Lewis.
