= Burlington Township School District =

School district in Burlington County, New Jersey, US

Address
- 700 Jacksonville Road Burlington Township, Burlington County, New Jersey, 08016; United States
- Coordinates: 40.066415°N 74.830525°W

District information
- Motto: Schools and Community - Partners in Learning
- Grades: PreK to 12
- Superintendent: Mary Ann Bell
- Business administrator: Nicholas Bice
- Schools: 4

Students and staff
- Enrollment: 3,712 (as of 2024–25)
- Faculty: 321.3 FTEs
- Student–teacher ratio: 11.6:1

Other information
- District Factor Group: FG
- Website: www.burltwpsch.org
Ind.	Per pupil	District spending	Rank (*)	K-12 average	%± vs. average
1A	Total Spending	$16,996	26	$18,891	−10.0%
1	Budgetary Cost	12,948	20	14,783	−12.4%
2	Classroom Instruction	8,721	54	8,763	−0.5%
6	Support Services	1,458	6	2,392	−39.0%
8	Administrative Cost	1,253	20	1,485	−15.6%
10	Operations & Maintenance	1,322	18	1,783	−25.9%
13	Extracurricular Activities	194	29	268	−27.6%
16	Median Teacher Salary	56,170	10	64,043
Data from NJDoE 2014 Taxpayers' Guide to Education Spending. *Of K-12 districts with more than 3,500 students. Lowest spending=1; Highest=103

The Burlington Township School District is a comprehensive community public school district that serves students in pre-kindergarten through twelfth grade from Burlington Township, in Burlington County, in the U.S. state of New Jersey.

As of the 2024–25 school year, the district, comprised of four schools, had an enrollment of 3,712 students and 321.3 classroom teachers (on an FTE basis), for a student–teacher ratio of 11.6:1.

== History ==
The Burlington Township School District received publicity in 2009 after a video posted on YouTube by a parent without school approval showed more than a dozen children at B. Bernice Young Elementary School singing a song praising President Barack Obama, which Conservative groups cited as a means of indoctrinating students to support the President. At the conclusion of the song, the children pump their fists and chant "hip, hip, hooray!" The song had been performed in conjunction with Black History Month activities and when the author of the book I Am Barack Obama visited the school the next month

The district had been classified by the New Jersey Department of Education as being in District Factor Group "FG", the fourth-highest of eight groupings. District Factor Groups organize districts statewide to allow comparison by common socioeconomic characteristics of the local districts. From lowest socioeconomic status to highest, the categories are A, B, CD, DE, FG, GH, I and J.

== Schools ==
Schools in the district (with 2024–25 enrollment data from the National Center for Education Statistics) are:

Elementary schools

- B. Bernice Young Elementary School with 681 students in Pre-K to 1st grade
  - Casey Kocsis, principal
- Fountain Woods Elementary School with 951 students in grades 2-5
  - April Gittens, principal

Middle school

- Burlington Township Middle School at Springside with 822 students in grades 6-8
  - Matthew J. Andris, principal

High school

- Burlington Township High School with 1,118 students in grades 9-12
  - Phil Brownridge, principal

== Administration ==
Core members of the district's administration are:

- Mary Ann Bell, superintendent
- Nicholas Bice, business administrator and board secretary

== Board of education ==
The district's board of education, comprised of nine members, sets policy and oversees the fiscal and educational operation of the district through its administration. As a Type II school district, the board's trustees are elected directly by voters to serve three-year terms of office on a staggered basis, with three seats up for election each year held (since 2013) as part of the November general election. The board appoints a superintendent to oversee the district's day-to-day operations and a business administrator to supervise the business functions of the district.
