= Peter Hill (clockmaker) =

American clockmaker

Peter Hill (July 19, 1767 – December 1820) was an American clockmaker. Hill, a former enslaved person, was the first African American clockmaker and the only African American clockmaker working during the late eighteenth century and early nineteenth century, if we set aside Benjamin Banneker.

== Biography ==
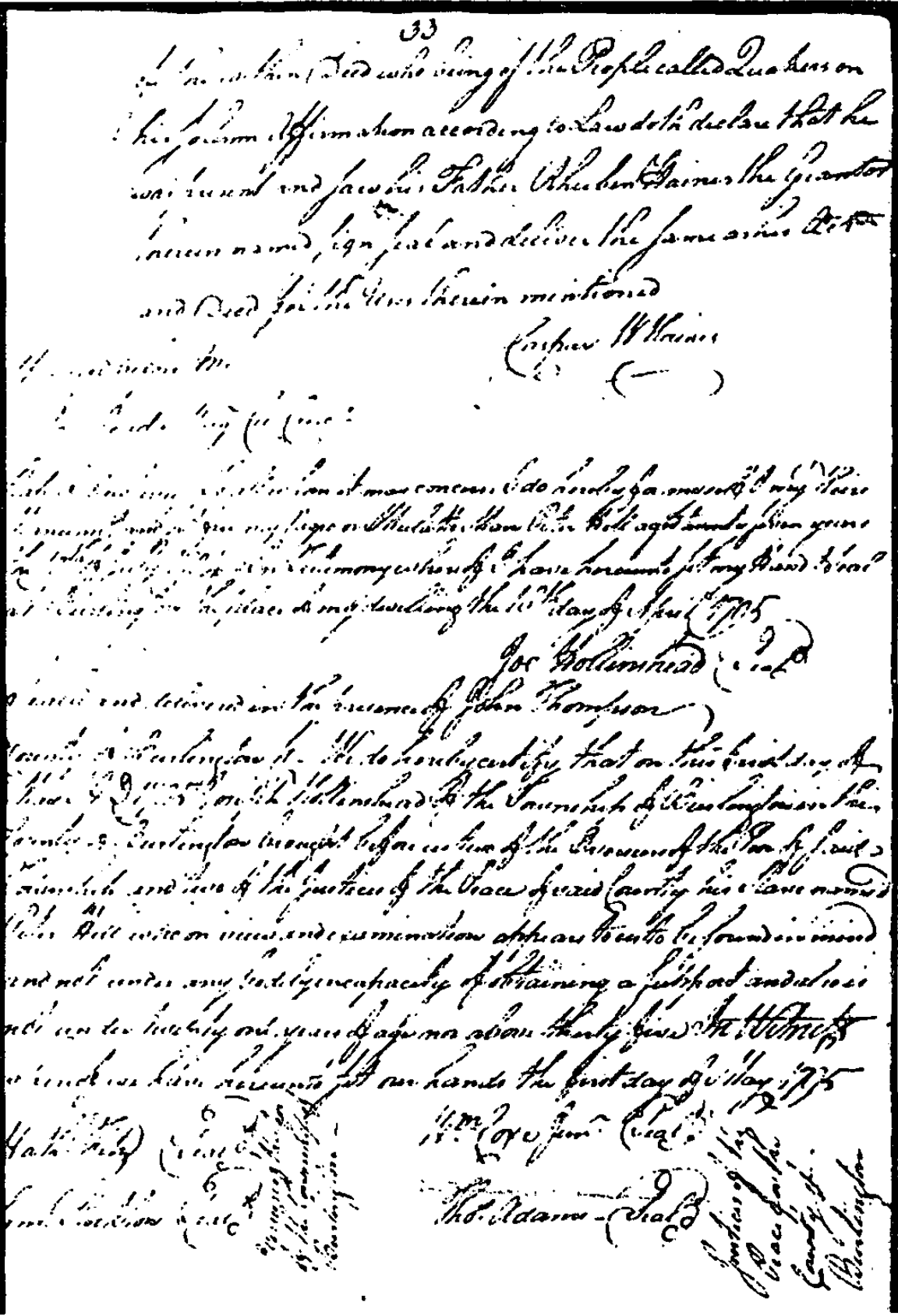
Manumission recorded in Burlington County records.

Peter Hill was born into slavery on July 19, 1767, and lived on the land owned by a Quaker and clockmaker, Joseph Hollinshead Jr in Burlington Township, New Jersey. Hill worked as an apprentice to Hollinshead, starting at age 14. Hollingshead helped Hill set up a clockmaking business of his own before freeing him. In 1794, Hill was given a certificate of manumission and was freed by his master. He was certified a free man in 1795.

Hill married Tina Lewis, an educator, on September 9, 1795. Hill and his wife lived in the same location as his clockmaking shop where he maintained the business there for 23 years. Hill was the first African American clockmaker and the only African American clockmaker working during the late 18th century and early 19th century. Around 1814, Hill moved his business to Mount Holly, New Jersey. On February 29, 1820, Hill purchased a large house in Mount Holly. He died in December of that same year. Hill was buried in the Society of Friends' Burial ground in Burlington Township.

Most of Hill's clocks did not survive, with only five known to exist today. One of Hill's clocks is in the collection of the National Museum of American History.
