= Ride On =

Ride On may refer to:

== Music ==
- Ride On (Christy Moore album), 1984, a cover of the song by Jimmy MacCarthy
- Ride On (Izzy Stradlin album), 1999, or the title song
- Ride On (Texas Hippie Coalition album), 2014, or the title song
- "Ride On", a song by AC/DC from the 1976 album Dirty Deeds Done Dirt Cheap
- "Ride On, Baby", a song by the Rolling Stones
- "Ride On", a song by Gotthard from the 1996 album G.
- "Ride On", a song by Jimmy MacCarthy

== Other ==
- Ride On (Maryland), public transit provider in Montgomery County, Maryland
- Ride On (film), 2023 film starred by Jackie Chan
