= Right On =

Right On may refer to:

== Albums ==
- Right On! (Jenny Lee Lindberg album), 2015
- Right On (The Supremes album), 1970
- Right On (Wilson Pickett album), 1970

== Songs ==
- "Right On" (song), by Lil Baby
- "Right On", by Marvin Gaye from his album What's Going On, (1971)
- "Right On", by Boogaloo Joe Jones from Right On Brother, 1970
- "Right On", by Gotthard from Firebirth, 2012
- "Right On", by the Roots from How I Got Over, 2010
- "Right On", by OMC, 1996
- "Right On", by The Rascals from Search and Nearness, 1970
- ""Right On!" (song)", by Silicone Soul

== Other uses ==
- Right On (TV series), a Canadian youth television series
- "Right On" (Beavis and Butt-head), an episode of Beavis and Butt-head
- Right On! (magazine), an American teen magazine catering to African-American readers
