= Sybilla Righton Masters =

American inventor

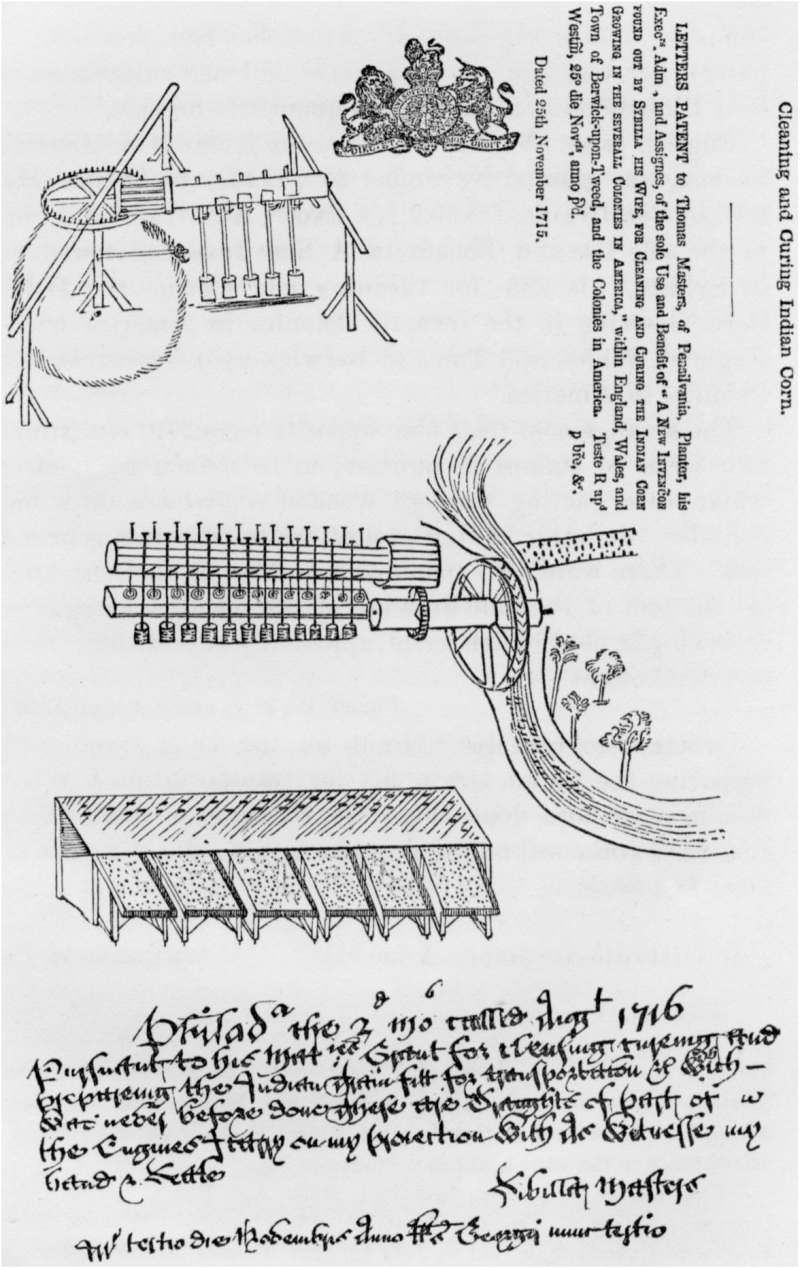
GB Patent 604 (1715), Cleaning and Curing Indian Corn, applied for by Sybilla Masters but granted to her husband Thomas Masters because women could not be legally recognised.

Sybilla Righton Masters (c. 1676 – 23 August 1720) was an American inventor. Masters was the first person residing in the American colonies to be given an English patent, and possibly the first known female machinery inventor in America of European ancestry. Masters was given a patent for a corn mill in 1715 in her husband's name, as women were not allowed to have their own patents. She also patented a process for making hats.

== Early life ==
Not much is known of Masters' early life. It is possible that she was born in Bermuda as her father had emigrated from there in 1687. It is believed that she was born around 1676, and in 1687 she and her six sisters emigrated from Bermuda to Burlington Township, New Jersey (along the Delaware River) with her Quaker parents Sarah and William Righton. Sybilla Righton first showed up in the colonial records in 1692 when she testified as a witness for her father in the New Jersey courts. Sometime between 1693 and 1696, Sybilla married Thomas Masters a prosperous Quaker merchant and landowner. They had four children: Mary, Sarah, Thomas, and William.

== The Idea ==
As it was for many colonial women of her time, Sybilla was a mistress of her household and spent her days cooking, cleaning, and caring for the children. Sybilla, however, made time to tinker with ideas on improving colonists' lives, especially women. One everyday meal prepared during colonial times was hominy, made from ground-up Indian Corn. Colonial women would prepare this meal by grinding the corn between stones, which was draining and tedious. Sybilla began taking note of how native women would grind the corn by using wooden posts. From this, her invention of a corn mill was born.

== Journey to London ==
On June 24, 1712, Masters left her family and headed to London to pursue patents for her invention ideas. In 1712, some American colonies were issuing patents, but Pennsylvania was not among them.

The process of obtaining a patent took a few years, meaning Sybilla had to stay in London for an extended period. During this period, she opened a shop selling bonnets and chair covers out of straw and palmetto leaves using a method for which she later received a patent.

On November 25, 1715, the patent was granted by King George I of Great Britain in her husband's name for the process of "Cleaning and Curing The Indian Corn Growing in the several Colonies of America," shown right.

If not for her husband Thomas Masters, Sybilla Masters' name, as so many women inventors before and after her, would have been lost to history. Thomas Masters stated in the patent submission that it was her idea and when the patent was issued, King George I stated publicly that it was her idea. Masters received her second patent, again under her husband's name, for a method of weaving straw and palmetto leaves into hats and bonnets. She opened a shop in London that used this process and sold many popular hats and bonnets. Masters returned home to Pennsylvania on May 25, 1716.

== Returning From London ==
After returning from London, Sybilla and her husband created the corn mill from the patent. They hoped the invention would sell well in England, but the creation was too ahead. In the colonies, however, it did well. The Southern Colonies were the largest purchasers, and hominy, now called grits, is still widely consumed in the South today. Sybillia eventually died in 1720 and will forever be remembered for the work she completed.

== Invention details ==
Masters' first patent was awarded for a new method of the curing and preparation of cornmeal used a stamping process instead of grinding. The machine consisted of a long wooden cylinder with projections on each side which caused a series of heavy pestles to drop onto mortars filled with corn kernels. This invention was powered by horses or water wheels. It produced a product Masters named, "Tuscarora Rice" which was falsely advertised and sold as a cure for tuberculosis. While the product did not catch on in England, it became a staple of the southeastern diet and is today known as grits.

The history of Masters and Tuscarora Rice was first described in 1844 by John Fanning Watson. Medical authorities have dismissed Tuscarora Rice as quackery.

Masters' second patent was awarded for a new process of making hats and bonnets using straw and palmetto leaves. The process was used to create many other woven goods as well, such as baskets, matting and furniture coverings.

== See also ==
- Timeline of United States inventions (before 1890)
