= Right On! (song) =

Single by Silicone Soul featuring Louise Clare Marshall

from the album Staring Into Space
- Released: 24 September 2001
- Recorded: 2000
- Genre: House
- Length: 3:11
- Label: VC Recordings
- Songwriters: Curtis Mayfield; Craig Morrison; Graeme Reedie; Rob Davis
- Producer: Silicone Soul

Silicone Soul featuring Louise Clare Marshall singles chronology
"Chic-O-Laa" (2000)	"Right On!" (2001)	"Les Nocturnes" (2004)

“Right On!” is a song by the Scottish house duo Silicone Soul. The track evolved over several versions from its earliest form “Right On 4 Tha Darkness” to the widely known “Right On Right On”, and then to a vocal version “Right On!” featuring Louise Clare Marshall, which was released as a single on 24 September 2001.

== Background and composition ==
Silicone Soul first developed the track in 1999 as “Right On 4 Tha Darkness”, a re-working of Curtis Mayfield’s “Right On for the Darkness”, which underlies the track’s string arrangement and orchestral motifs. In interviews, Craig Morrison explained that the duo wanted to make a record “with strings and depth that still worked on the dancefloor,” which eventually evolved into “Right On Right On."

The song gained popularity in Ibiza’s club scene, becoming an anthem in the early 2000s—particularly at the nightclub Space, which helped push the track to broader European recognition.

== Critical reception and legacy ==
DJ Mag described “Right On” as a “cult Ibiza anthem” whose orchestral sweep and vocal iterations allowed it to transcend underground dance floors into wider recognition. A 20-year retrospective by Change Underground notes that its unusual length and orchestral sweep didn’t prevent it from becoming a floor-filler, crediting DJs in Ibiza with breaking it internationally. In a review of a Darkroom Dubs compilation, BlackPlastic mentions “Right On!” as the “genre-defying track … that found a place in many DJs’ sets,” and remarks that it moved beyond simple club crossover to become part of the duo’s defining identity.

== Track listing ==
- 12" Vinyl (VC Recordings, 2001)*
1. "Right On! (Vocal Mix)" – 7:10
2. "Right On Right On (Original Mix)" – 6:50
3. "Right On! (Radio Edit)" – 3:55

== Charts ==
Chart (2001)	Peak position
Europe (Eurochart Hot 100)	64
France (SNEP)	93
Germany (GfK)	83
Italy (FIMI)	41
Netherlands (Single Top 100)	81
Spain (Promusicae)	13
Switzerland (Schweizer Hitparade)	45
UK Singles (OCC)	15
UK Dance (OCC)	1
