= Eric Rogers (defensive back) =

American football player (born 2002)

Orlando Storm
- Position: Cornerback
- Roster status: Unsigned draft pick

Personal information
- Born: April 2, 2002 (age 24); Hackensack, New Jersey, U.S.
- Listed height: 6 ft 2 in (1.88 m)
- Listed weight: 189 lb (86 kg)

Career information
- High school: Burlington Township (Burlington, New Jersey)
- College: Northern Illinois (2020–2022); Rutgers (2023–2024)
- NFL draft: 2025: undrafted

Career history
- Los Angeles Chargers (2025); Orlando Storm (2027-present)
- Stats at Pro Football Reference

Eric Rogers (born April 2, 2002) is an American professional football cornerback. He played college football for the Northern Illinois Huskies and Rutgers Scarlet Knights.

== Early life ==
Rogers was born on April 2, 2002, in Hackensack, New Jersey. Raised in Burlington Township, New Jersey, he attended Burlington Township High School where he played football as a cornerback, earning second-team all-conference in 2018 and first-team all-conference in 2019 while serving as team captain and totaling 60 tackles in the latter season. He also helped Burlington Township to a conference title as a junior in 2018. A three-star recruit and the 42nd-ranked player in the state, he committed to play college football for the Northern Illinois Huskies.

== College career ==
Rogers did not appear in any games for the Huskies in 2020, then won a starting role in 2021, posting 26 tackles before missing the rest of the year due to injury. In 2022, started six of 10 games and made 17 tackles, four pass breakups and two interceptions. Both of his interceptions came in the season-opener, earning him Mid-American Conference (MAC) Defensive Player of the Week honors. After the season, Rogers entered the NCAA transfer portal and transferred to the Rutgers Scarlet Knights. He tallied 19 tackles and six pass breakups in 13 games in 2023 before concluding his collegiate career with 34 tackles, three pass breakups and a sack during the 2024 season, in which he started 11 games.

== Professional career ==
Pre-draft measurables
Height	Weight	Arm length	Hand span	Wingspan	40-yard dash	10-yard split	20-yard split	20-yard shuttle	Three-cone drill	Vertical jump	Broad jump
6 ft 1 1/2 in (1.87 m)	178 lb (81 kg)	32 1/8 in (0.82 m)	9 3/8 in (0.24 m)	6 ft 4 3/4 in (1.95 m)	4.64 s	1.52 s	2.68 s	4.25 s	6.84 s	32.0 in (0.81 m)	10 ft 3 in (3.12 m)
All values from Pro Day

Rogers signed with the Los Angeles Chargers as an undrafted free agent on April 26, 2025. He initially made the 53-man roster before being placed on injured reserve on August 27.

On August 30, 2026, Rogers was waived by the Chargers as a part of final roster cuts.
