= Ken Plummer (sociologist) =

British sociologist (1946–2022)

- Born: Kenneth Plummer; 4 April 1946; Palmers Green, London, England
- Died: 4 November 2022 (aged 76)
- Known for: Critical humanism
- Awards: Simon-Gagnon Lifetime Achievement Award (2001)

Academic background
- Education: London School of Economics
- Thesis: Reactions to Deviance: two studies (1970)

Academic work
- Discipline: Sociology
- Institutions: University of Essex

Kenneth Plummer (4 April 1946 – 4 November 2022) was a British sociologist. He was a professor of sociology at the University of Essex for 30 years. Plummer was the founder of the Sexualities journal, which he ran until 2012, and a theoretician of critical humanism. He was one of the pioneers of sociology-oriented LGBT studies and one of the first researchers to study homosexuality as a stigmatized sexuality, instead of an illness. He has published a number of books on sexuality and sociology.

== Biography ==
Plummer was born in Palmers Green, London. He first joined gay community circles at the age of 20, and became a member of the London Gay Liberation Front during the 1970s. At that time, he was supervised by Jock Young and Stan Cohen during his PhD course at the London School of Economics. He was one of the first British academics, along with Mary Susan McIntosh and others, to examine homosexuality as a stigmatized sexual orientation, instead of an illness.

Plummer wrote extensively on culture war topics, often from a perspective sympathetic to transgender and queer people. He was a progressive liberal, but not a revolutionary. He wrote in his later years that he had spent most of his life wanting "to be a Marxist, and not quite being able to make it: intellectually, politically or emotionally".

Plummer founded the Sexualities journal in 1998. He became the first recipient of the American Sociological Association's Simon-Gagnon Lifetime Achievement Award in 2001. Following his retirement due to health issues, he started intensively publishing books on the field of sociology. He also developed his theory of critical humanism during that period. Plummer has published on the topic of symbolic interactionism, and on how narratives and storytelling can influence systems of power in society. He was featured on The Independent's Rainbow List in 2011 for "pioneer[ing] the sociological study of gay life in the 1960s". Plummer published Imaginations, a book about the history of sociology research at the University of Essex, in 2014.

A recipient of an organ donation himself, Plummer started advocating in favor of organ donation campaigns after going a series of surgeries. He documented his health issues in his essay titled "My Multiple Sick Bodies". He died from a kidney disease in late 2022, having authored over 170 publications during his career. He posthumously received a Distinguished Service to British Sociology award from the British Sociological Association.

== Books ==
- Sexual Stigma (1975)
- The Making of the Modern Homosexual (1981)
- Documents of Life (1983)
- Telling Sexual Stories (1995)
- Documents of Life 2: An Invitation to a Critical Humanism (2000)
- Intimate Citizenship (2003)
- Sociology: The Basics (2010)
- Imaginations (2014)
- Cosmopolitan sexualities (2015)
- Narrative Power: The Struggle for Human Value (2019)
