= Morris Fraser =

British child psychiatrist

- Citizenship: British
- Occupation: Child psychiatrist
- Years active: 1971 -
- Employer(s): Royal Belfast Hospital for Sick Children (former); Royal Victoria Hospital, Belfast (ditto)

Academic background
- Education: Royal College of Physicians

Academic work
- Discipline: Psychiatry
- Sub-discipline: Pediatric psychiatry
- Main interests: The Northern Ireland conflict's effects on children
- Notable works: Children in Conflict (1971); Death of Narcissus (1976)

Morris Fraser is a Scottish child psychiatrist, researcher and book author who has authored a number of academic research about the mental health effects of the Northern Ireland conflict, especially on children. His work on the conflict is among the first from the field of mental health.

Fraser has worked as a counselor for traumatized children at the Royal Belfast Hospital for Sick Children and as the senior psychiatric registrar of a Royal Victoria Hospital pediatric clinic. He was convicted of a number of sexual crimes throughout his career.

== History ==
Fraser began treating children psychologically impacted by the Northern Ireland conflict in 1969, after which he started publishing some of the first systematic studies about the conflict's mental health effects. In March 1971, he published a study in the British Journal of Psychiatry, titled "Disorder and Defenses", which investigated the rates of pathological symptoms among Belfast children affected by the Northern Ireland conflict riots. The paper won an award by the British Mental Health Research Fund. Fraser was among the social workers who defended the integration of Catholic and Protestant schools as a means of stopping the conflict.

In his 1973 book Children in Conflict: Growing up in Northern Ireland, he discusses the experiences of children who were traumatized by the violence of the Northern Ireland conflict. The findings of the book were based on previous academic research about the effects of war on children, as well as interviews conducted with 250 children. Fraser has also reported on the use of children for military purposes during the conflict, which he said was more exploitative than it had been in Cyprus and Vietnam. His research also found that Belfast slum residents in the 1970s were more unhappy in general than African-American ghetto dwellers.

Fraser published The Death of Narcissus in 1976, a book about pedophilia that analyses common motifs relating to children in the creative works of Vladimir Nabokov, Dean Farrar, J. M. Barrie, Lewis Carroll, George MacDonald, E. M. Forster, Thomas Mann, Oscar Wilde, Charles Kingsley, Hugh Walpole and Henry James, among others. Fraser is a former member of PIE and has treated pedophile patients. He has also written for a number of European pedophile magazines. Throughout the latter half of the 20th century, he was prosecuted for a number of sexual crimes.
