= Ryton =

Ryton may refer to:

== Places in England ==
- Ryton, Gloucestershire, a location
- Ryton, North Yorkshire
- Ryton, Shropshire
- Ryton, Tyne and Wear
  - Ryton Island, a historic island on the River Tyne
- Ryton, Warwickshire (in Bulkington)
- Ryton-on-Dunsmore, Warwickshire
- Great Ryton, Shropshire

== People ==
- George Ryton (born 1948), British Formula One engineer
- Royce Ryton (1924–2009), English playwright
- Thomas Ryton, English politician in the 14th century

== Other uses ==
- Ryton plant, a car manufacturing plant near Coventry, England
- River Ryton, England
- Ryton River, New Zealand
- Ryton F.C., Tyne and Wear, England
- Poly(p-phenylene sulfide), with Ryton among its trade names
