= Peter Righton =

British child protection expert and sex abuser

Paul Pelham Righton (14 April 1926 – 12 October 2007), known as Peter Righton, was a child protection expert and social care worker, convicted of importing child sexual abuse material. In 2013, the Metropolitan Police launched Operation Cayacos to investigate claims that Righton was part of an establishment paedophile network.

== Career ==
Righton worked in children's homes, including in Maidstone, Kent, and was a lecturer in child protection and residential care, including at the Open University and in Birmingham. He was Director of Education at the National Institute of Social Work, and vice-chairman of governors at New Barns School in Toddington, Gloucestershire. He was also a consultant to the National Children's Bureau. Righton justified relationships between adults and children in his academic work - he wrote in Social Work Today in 1977 that "Provided there is no question of exploitation, sexual relationships freely entered into by residents – including adolescents – should not be a matter for automatic inquiry", and wrote in the book Perspectives on Paedophilia that "Most child molesters, if paedophile at all, are so only incidentally. Most of those I have called 'dispositional' paedophiles, when they engage in sexual activity with children, do not molest them... On the contrary, the child's consent is usually of cardinal importance to them."

== Child abuse and conviction ==
Journalist Nick Davies called Righton "a notorious paedophile who attempted to legitimise his obsession in a series of academic studies." Righton was a founding member of the Paedophile Information Exchange (number 51). Child protection manager Peter McKelvie helped in the investigation. Righton, then living in Evesham, was convicted by a magistrates court in September 1992 of importing child sexual abuse magazines and photographs after Customs and Excise intercepted material being sent to him from the Netherlands that April. A police raid on his home uncovered other paedophile magazines, and letters to and from other paedophiles containing details of abuse. He was fined £900 with £75 costs for importing child abuse images, had the magazines destroyed, and was cautioned for an historical assault. The BBC's Inside Story documentary reported in 1994 that he was allowed to leave a boarding school under a "gentleman's agreement" after being found to have abused boys. He had confessed past abuse to child protection colleagues, but they did not act on this out of loyalty to him. A former student of his wrote that his position of power, authority and charisma allowed him and other paedophiles to avoid detection and to lead some to turn a blind eye to suspicions. Liz Davies, a reader in child protection at London Metropolitan University who was involved in the investigation into his abuses in Islington, wrote that Righton was allowed to live on the Thornham Magna estate of Lord Henniker in Suffolk, where children from Islington continued to be taken, apparently until his death; Member of Parliament Tom Watson wrote that the Chief Constable of Suffolk warned against Righton being allowed to live on the estate but was ignored.

In October 2012, Watson claimed that Righton was involved in a paedophile ring with connections to the British Government. Former West Mercia police detective Terry Shutt made similar claims in 2014. Operation Cayacos, an investigation into historical claims of child abuse being conducted by the Metropolitan Police, began investigating claims of a paedophile network connected to Righton in 2013. Operation Cayacos is a spin-off of Operation Fairbank, investigating the Elm Guest House child abuse scandal.

== Works ==
- Righton, Peter (1981). "The adult". In Brian Taylor (ed.). Perspectives on Paedophilia. London: Batsford Academic and Educational.
- Sonia Morgan and Peter Righton, ed. (1989). Child Care: Concerns and Conflicts. A Reader. London: Hodder & Stoughton in association with the Open University.
