= Forrest Reid =

Irish novelist, literary critic and translator (1875–1947)

- Born: 24 June 1875; Belfast
- Died: 4 January 1947 (aged 71); Warrenpoint, County Down
- Citizenship: British
- Education: Christ's College, Cambridge
- Occupation: Novelist
- Writing career
- Language: English
- Years active: 1904-1944
- Notable awards: James Tait Black Memorial Prize (1944)

Forrest Reid (24 June 1875, Belfast, Ireland – 4 January 1947, Warrenpoint, County Down, Northern Ireland) was an Irish novelist, literary critic and translator. He was a leading pre-war novelist of boyhood and is still acclaimed as a noted Ulster novelist, being awarded the 1944 James Tait Black Memorial Prize for his novel Young Tom.

== Early life and education ==
Born in Belfast, he was the youngest son of a Protestant family of twelve, six of whom survived. He was educated at the Royal Belfast Academical Institution. His father, Robert Reid (1825–1881), was the manager of a felt works, having failed as a shipowner at Liverpool, and came from a well-established upper-middle-class Ulster family; his mother, Frances Matilda, was his father's second wife. She was the daughter of Captain Robert Parr, of the 54th Regiment of Foot, of the landed gentry Parr family of Shropshire, related to Catherine Parr, last wife of King Henry VIII.

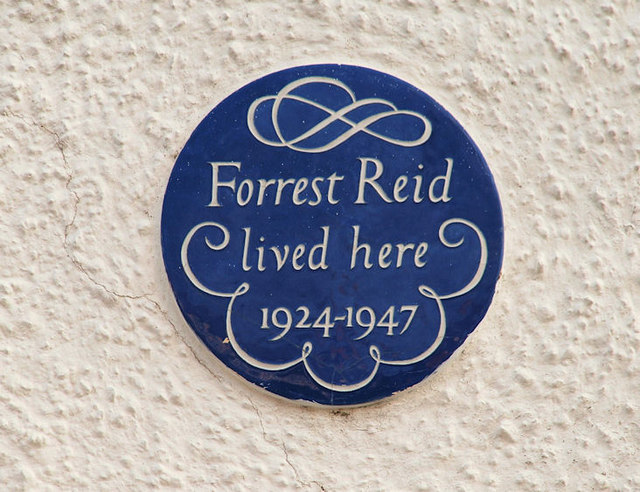
A plaque reading "Forrest Reid lived here 1924–1947" on a house at 13 Ormiston Crescent, Belfast.

Reid entered Christ's College, Cambridge, in 1905, graduating BA in medieval and modern languages in 1908. He returned to Belfast, and met E. M. Forster, who remained a lifelong friend, in February 1912. After graduation Forster continued to visit Reid, who was then settled back in Belfast. In 1952, Forster traveled to Belfast to unveil a plaque commemorating Forrest Reid's life (at 13 Ormiston Crescent).

== Works and influences ==
As well as his fiction, Reid also translated poems from the Greek Anthology (Greek Authors (Faber, 1943)). His study of the work of W. B. Yeats (W. B. Yeats: A Critical Study (1915)) has been acclaimed as one of the best critical studies of that poet. He also wrote the definitive work on the English woodcut artists of the 1860s (Illustrators of the Sixties (1928)); his collection of original illustrations from that time is housed in the Ashmolean Museum, Oxford.

He was a close friend of Walter de la Mare, whom he first met in 1913, and about whose fiction he published a perceptive book in 1929. Reid was also an influence on novelist Stephen Gilbert, and had good connections to the Bloomsbury Group of writers. Reid was a founding member of the Imperial Art League (later the Artists League of Great Britain). Reid was also a close friend of Arthur Greeves, the artist known to be C. S. Lewis's best friend. Greeves painted several portraits of Reid, now all in the possession of the Royal Belfast Academical Institution.

== Critical standing ==
A "Forrest Reid Collection" is held at the University of Exeter, consisting of first editions of all his works and books about Reid. Many of his original manuscripts are in the archives of the Belfast Central Library. In 2008, Queen's University Belfast catalogued a large collection of Forrest Reid documentary material it had recently acquired, including many letters from E.M. Forster.

== Works ==
=== Fiction ===
- The Kingdom of Twilight (1904)
- The Garden God – A Tale of Two Boys (1905)
- The Bracknels – A Family Chronicle (1911), revised as Denis Bracknel (1947)
- Following Darkness (1912)
- The Gentle Lover – A Comedy of Middle Age (1913)
- At the Door of the Gate (1915)
- The Spring Song (1916)
- A Garden by the Sea (1918)(stories)
- Pirates of the Spring (1919)
- Pender among the Residents (1922)
- Demophon – a Traveller's Tale (1927)
- Uncle Stephen (1931)
- Brian Westby (1934)
- The Retreat (1936)
- Peter Waring (1937)
- Young Tom (1944)

Out-of-copyright works (pre-1930s) may be available at https://www.gutenberg.org Search for the author and/or the title.

=== Autobiography ===
- Apostate (1926)
- Private Road (1940)

=== Reissue editions ===
Beginning in 2007, Valancourt Books began releasing editions of Reid's works, all containing new introductions by authors and scholars:

- The Garden God: A Tale of Two Boys (2007), edited with a foreword, introduction and notes by Michael Matthew Kaylor
- The Tom Barber Trilogy (2011) hardcover two-volume set
- The Spring Song (2013)
- Following Darkness (2013)
- Brian Westby (2013)
- Denis Bracknel (2014)
- Pender among the Residents (2014)
- Uncle Stephen (2014)
- The Retreat (2015)
- Young Tom (2015)

== See also ==
- List of Northern Irish writers
- Forrest Reid: A Portrait and a Study
