= 2015 CollegeInsider.com Postseason Tournament =

NCAA Division I basketball tournament

- Season: 2014–15
- Teams: 32
- Finals site: Ford Center, Evansville, Indiana
- Champions: Evansville (1st title)
- Runner-up: Northern Arizona (1st title game)
- Semifinalists: UT Martin (1st semifinal); NJIT (1st semifinal)
- Winning coach: Marty Simmons (1st title)
- MVP: D.J. Balentine (Evansville)

The 2015 CollegeInsider.com Postseason Tournament (CIT) was a postseason single-elimination tournament of 32 NCAA Division I basketball teams. The first round started on March 16, 2015. The semifinals were played on March 31, and the championship game was on April 2, 2015. The Evansville Purple Aces beat the Northern Arizona Lumberjacks for their first CIT championship.

Thirty-two participants who belonged to "mid-major" conferences, or were independent, and were not invited to the 2015 NCAA Tournament, National Invitation Tournament (NIT), or College Basketball Invitational (CBI) made up the field.

At the request of the NCAA Men's Basketball Rules Committee, the CIT experimented with a 30-second shot clock during the 2015 tournament.

== Participating teams ==
The following teams received an invitation to the 2015 CIT:

School	Conference	Overall record	Conference record
Bowling Green	Mid-American	20–11	11–7
Canisius	MAAC	16–14	11–9
Cleveland State	Horizon	18–14	11–5
Dartmouth	Ivy League	14–14	7–7
Eastern Illinois	Ohio Valley	17–14	9–7
Eastern Kentucky	Ohio Valley	19–11	11–5
Evansville	Missouri Valley	19–12	9–9
Florida Gulf Coast	Atlantic Sun	22–10	12–3
Grand Canyon	WAC	17–14	8–6
High Point	Big South	22–9	13–5
Incarnate Word	Southland	18–10	10–8
IPFW	Summit	16–14	9–7
James Madison	CAA	19–13	12–6
Kent State	Mid-American	21–11	12–6
Louisiana–Lafayette	Sun Belt	20–13	13–7
Maryland Eastern Shore	MEAC	18–14	11–5
Middle Tennessee	Conference USA	19–16	9–9
New Hampshire	America East	19–12	11–5
NJIT	D-I independent	18–11	—
Norfolk State	MEAC	20–13	12–4
Northern Arizona	Big Sky	19–14	13–5
Northwestern State	Southland	19–12	13–5
Oakland	Horizon	16–16	11–5
Portland	West Coast	17–15	7–11
Sacramento State	Big Sky	20–11	13–5
Saint Francis (PA)	Northeast	16–15	9–9
Sam Houston State	Southland	25–8	15–3
Texas A&M–Corpus Christi	Southland	19–13	13–5
UNC Wilmington	CAA	18–13	12–6
USC Upstate	Atlantic Sun	23–11	8–6
UT Martin	Ohio Valley	18–12	10–6
Western Michigan	Mid-American	20–12	10–8

== Format ==
As in the previous year, the CIT used the former model which was traditionally used by the NIT in which teams are re-seeded and match-ups are determined based on the results of the previous round. All games were played on campus sites.

== Schedule ==
Date	Time*	Matchup	Recap	Boxscore	Television
First round
March 16	7:00 pm	New Hampshire 77 at **NJIT 84**			
March 17	7:00 pm	**Eastern Illinois 97** at Oakland 91			Comcast 900
March 17	7:00 pm	James Madison 72 at **USC Upstate 73**			ESPN3
March 17	7:00 pm	**Bowling Green 67** at Saint Francis (PA) 64			
March 17	7:00 pm	Norfolk State 75 at **Eastern Kentucky 81**			
March 17	8:00 pm	**UL-Lafayette 83** at Incarnate Word 68			
March 18	7:00 pm	UMES 64 at **High Point 70**			
March 18	7:00 pm	Dartmouth 72 at **Canisius 87**			
March 18	7:00 pm	**Texas A&M–Corpus Christi 75** at FGCU 69			ESPN3
March 18	7:00 pm	**Cleveland State 86** at Western Michigan 57			
March 18	7:00 pm	**Kent State 68** at Middle Tennessee 56			
March 18	7:05 pm	IPFW 77 at **Evansville 82**			
March 18	7:30 pm	UNC Wilmington 71 at **Sam Houston State 87**			
March 18	8:00 pm	**Northern Arizona 75** at Grand Canyon 70			Cox 7
March 18	10:00 pm	**Sacramento State 73** at Portland 66			
March 19	7:30 pm	**UT Martin 104** at Northwestern State 79			
Second round
March 20	7:00 pm	High Point 65 at **Eastern Kentucky 66**			
March 21	1:00 pm	**Canisius 82** at Bowling Green 59			BCSN
March 21	3:00 pm	**UL Lafayette 71** at Sam Houston State 70			
March 21	5:00 pm	**UT Martin 60** at USC Upstate 49			ESPN3
March 21	10:00 pm	**Northern Arizona 78** at Sacramento State 73			
March 23	7:00 pm	Cleveland State 77 at **NJIT 80**			
March 23	8:00 pm	**Evansville 83** at Eastern Illinois 68			
March 23	8:00 pm	**Kent State 69** at Texas A&M–Corpus Christi 65			
Quarterfinals
March 25	7:00 pm	**UT Martin 70** at Eastern Kentucky 69			
March 26	7:30 pm	**Evansville 89** at UL Lafayette 82			
March 27	10:00 pm	Kent State 73 at **Northern Arizona 74** OT			FCS Atlantic; FS Arizona+ STO
March 28	7:30 pm	Canisius 73 at **NJIT 78**			
Semifinals
March 31	7:00 pm	UT Martin 66 at **Evansville 79**			CBSSN
March 31	9:00 pm	NJIT 61 at **Northern Arizona 68**			CBSSN
Championship
April 2	7:00 pm	Northern Arizona 65 at **Evansville 71**			CBSSN
* All game times in Eastern Daylight Time. Winning team in **bold**.

== Bracket ==
Bracket is for visual purposes only. The CIT does not have a set bracket.

First round March 16–19
Dartmouth	72
Canisius	87
Bowling Green	67
Saint Francis (PA)	64
Cleveland State	86
Western Michigan	57
New Hampshire	77
NJIT	84
Kent State	68
Middle Tennessee	56
Texas A&M–Corpus Christi	75
Florida Gulf Coast	69
Northern Arizona	75
Grand Canyon	70
Sacramento State	73
Portland	66
UT Martin	104
Northwestern State	79
James Madison	72
USC Upstate	73
Maryland Eastern Shore	64
High Point	70
Norfolk State	75
Eastern Kentucky	81
IPFW	77
Evansville	82
Eastern Illinois	97
Oakland	91
Louisiana–Lafayette	83
Incarnate Word	68
UNC Wilmington	71
Sam Houston State	87

Second round March 20–23
Canisius	82
Bowling Green	59
Cleveland State	77
NJIT	80
Kent State	69
Texas A&M–Corpus Christi	65
Northern Arizona	78
Sacramento State	73
UT Martin	60
USC Upstate	49
High Point	65
Eastern Kentucky	66
Evansville	83
Eastern Illinois	68
Louisiana–Lafayette	71
Sam Houston State	70

Quarterfinals; March 25–28
Canisius	73
NJIT	78
Kent State	73
Northern Arizona	74*
UT Martin	70
Eastern Kentucky	69
Evansville	89
Louisiana–Lafayette	82

Semifinals; March 31
NJIT	61
Northern Arizona	68
UT Martin	66
Evansville	79

Championship; April 2
Northern Arizona	65
Evansville	71

Home teams listed second.
* Denotes overtime period.
