= 2014–15 New Hampshire Wildcats men's basketball team =

American college basketball season

2014–15 New Hampshire Wildcats men's basketball

CIT, First round
- Conference: America East Conference
- Record: 19–13 (11–5 America East)
- Head coach: Bill Herrion (10th season)
- Assistant coaches: Kenneth Dempsey; Chris Mohr; Marc Kuntz
- Home arena: Lundholm Gym

2014–15 America East Conference men's basketball standings
	Conf.				Overall
Team	W		L	PCT	W		L	PCT
Albany †	15	–	1	.938	24	–	9	.727
Stony Brook	12	–	4	.750	23	–	12	.657
Vermont	12	–	4	.750	20	–	14	.588
New Hampshire	11	–	5	.688	19	–	13	.594
Hartford	7	–	9	.438	14	–	16	.467
UMass Lowell*	6	–	10	.375	12	–	17	.414
Binghamton	5	–	11	.313	6	–	26	.188
UMBC	2	–	14	.125	4	–	26	.133
Maine	2	–	14	.125	3	–	27	.100
† 2015 America East tournament winner *ineligible for postseason play due to Div. I transition

The 2014–15 New Hampshire Wildcats men's basketball team represented the University of New Hampshire during the 2014–15 NCAA Division I men's basketball season. The Wildcats, led by tenth year head coach Bill Herrion, played their home games at Lundholm Gym and were members of the America East Conference. They finished the season 19–13, 11–5 in America East play to finish in fourth place.

They advanced to the semifinals of the America East tournament where they lost to Albany. They were invited to the CollegeInsider.com Postseason Tournament (CIT) where they lost in the first round to NJIT.

== Roster ==
Number	Name	Position	Height	Weight	Year	Hometown
0	Jaleen Smith	Guard	6–4	195	Sophomore	Freeport, Texas
3	Jacoby Armstrong	Forward	6–7	230	Sophomore	Sachse, Texas
4	Keon Burns	Guard	6–4	205	Freshman	Beaverton, Oregon
5	Daniel Dion	Guard	6–0	175	Sophomore	Cedar Park, Texas
10	Iba Camara	Forward	6–9	225	Freshman	Dakar, Senegal
11	Tommy McDonnell	Guard	6–3	175	Senior	Durham, North Carolina
12	Frank Okeke	Forward	6–6	220	Junior	DeSoto, Texas
14	John Edwards	Forward	6–6	205	Sophomore	Charlotte, North Carolina
20	Matt Miller	Guard	6–4	185	Senior	Arnold, Maryland
21	Tanner Leissner	Forward	6–6	210	Freshman	Converse, Texas
22	Logan Mortenson	Forward	6–7	210	Junior	South Jordan, Utah
23	Ronnel Jordan	Guard/Forward	6–3	194	Junior	San Antonio, Texas
24	Williams Gabriel	Forward	6–8	215	Sophomore	Lagos, Nigeria
30	Joe Bramanti	Guard	6–2	195	Junior	Andover, Massachusetts

== Schedule ==
Date time, TV	Opponent	Result	Record	Site (attendance) city, state
Regular season
11/14/2014*; 7:00 pm	at Boston College	L 50–58	0–1	Conte Forum (3,174); Chestnut Hill, MA
11/18/2014*; 7:00 pm	Thomas	W 84–36	1–1	Lundholm Gym (452); Durham, NH
11/20/2014*; 7:00 pm	Bryant	L 63–72	1–2	Chace Athletic Center (1,422); Smithfield, RI
11/25/2014*; 7:00 pm	Boston University	W 75–68	2–2	Lundholm Gym (515); Durham, NH
11/30/2014*; 3:00 pm	at Dartmouth; Rivalry	W 65–63	3–2	Leede Arena (697); Hanover, NH
12/03/2014*; 7:00 pm	at LIU Brooklyn	W 72–56	4–2	Steinberg Wellness Center (1,112); Brooklyn, NY
12/06/2014*; 5:00 pm	Wheelock	W 96–45	5–2	Lundholm Gym (N/A); Durham, NH
12/09/2014*; 7:00 pm, BTN	at Rutgers	L 56–60	5–3	The RAC (3,967); Piscataway, NJ
12/14/2014*; 1:00 pm	Colgate	W 63–57	6–3	Lundholm Gym (552); Durham, NH
12/20/2014*; 1:00 pm	at Sacred Heart	L 60–73	6–4	William H. Pitt Center (186); Fairfield, CT
12/22/2014*; 7:00 pm	LIU Brooklyn	L 72–73 ^{OT}	6–5	Lundholm Gym (532); Durham, NH
12/30/2014*; 7:00 pm	at Western Michigan	L 56–70	6–6	University Arena (N/A); Kalamazoo, MI
01/03/2015; 7:00 pm	at Stony Brook	L 61–71	6–7 (0–1)	Island Federal Credit Union Arena (3,224); Stony Brook, NY
01/06/2015; 7:00 pm	Albany	L 62–64	6–8 (0–2)	Lundholm Gym (485); Durham, NH
01/08/2015*; 7:00 pm	Brown	W 68–61	7–8	Lundholm Gym (456); Durham, NH
01/11/2015; 1:00 pm	at UMBC	W 63–60	8–8 (1–2)	Retriever Activities Center (632); Catonsville, MD
01/14/2015; 7:00 pm	Hartford	L 67–68	8–9 (1–3)	Lundholm Gym (463); Durham, NH
01/17/2015; 2:00 pm	at Binghamton	W 73–66 ^{OT}	9–9 (2–3)	Binghamton University Events Center (1,761); Vestal, NY
01/19/2015; 3:30 pm, FCS	UMass Lowell	W 67–64 ^{OT}	10–9 (3–3)	Lundholm Gym (856); Durham, NH
01/22/2015; 7:00 pm	Vermont	W 73–68	11–9 (4–3)	Lundholm Gym (917); Durham, NH
01/28/2015; 7:00 pm	at Maine	W 63–58	12–9 (5–3)	Cross Insurance Center (1,106); Bangor, ME
01/31/2015; 12:00 pm, WBIN/FCS	Stony Brook	W 63–48	13–9 (6–3)	Lundholm Gym (1,013); Durham, NH
02/04/2015; 7:00 pm, ESPN3	at Albany	L 62–63	13–10 (6–4)	SEFCU Arena (2,712); Albany, NY
02/07/2015; 1:00 pm	UMBC	W 80–46	14–10 (7–4)	Lundholm Gym (907); Durham, NH
02/10/2015; 7:00 pm	at Hartford	W 76–70 ^{OT}	15–10 (8–4)	Chase Arena at Reich Family Pavilion (1,751); Hartford, CT
02/14/2015; 2:00 pm	Binghamton	W 66–48	16–10 (9–4)	Lundholm Gym (1,071); Durham, NH
02/21/2015; 4:00 pm	UMass Lowell	W 76–60	17–10 (10–4)	Tsongas Arena (1,950); Lowell, MA
02/25/2015; 7:00 pm, ESPN3	at Vermont	L 49–64	17–11 (10–5)	Patrick Gym (2,495); Burlington, VT
02/28/2015; 1:00 pm	Maine	W 65–56	18–11 (11–5)	Lundholm Gym (1,713); Durham, NH
America East tournament
03/04/2015; 7:00 pm, ESPN3	Hartford; Quarterfinals	W 67–63 ^{OT}	19–11	Lundholm Gym (1,848); Durham, NH
03/08/2015; 2:00 pm, ESPN3	at Albany; Semifinals	L 58–60	19–12	SEFCU Arena (4,122); Albany, NY
CIT
03/16/2015*; 7:00 pm	at NJIT; First round	L 77–84	19–13	Fleisher Center (1,303); Newark, NJ
*Non-conference game. ^{#}Rankings from AP Poll. (#) Tournament seedings in parentheses. All times are in Eastern Time.
