= 2015 America East men's basketball tournament =

- Classification: Division I
- Season: 2014–15
- Teams: 8
- Site: Campus sites
- Champions: Albany (5th title)
- Winning coach: Will Brown (5th title)
- MVP: Peter Hooley (Albany)
- Television: ESPN2

2014–15 America East Conference men's basketball standings
| | Conf. | | | | Overall |
| Team | W | | L | PCT | W | | L | PCT |
|---|---|---|---|---|---|---|---|---|
| Albany † | 15 | – | 1 | .938 | 24 | – | 9 | .727 |
| Stony Brook | 12 | – | 4 | .750 | 23 | – | 12 | .657 |
| Vermont | 12 | – | 4 | .750 | 20 | – | 14 | .588 |
| New Hampshire | 11 | – | 5 | .688 | 19 | – | 13 | .594 |
| Hartford | 7 | – | 9 | .438 | 14 | – | 16 | .467 |
| UMass Lowell* | 6 | – | 10 | .375 | 12 | – | 17 | .414 |
| Binghamton | 5 | – | 11 | .313 | 6 | – | 26 | .188 |
| UMBC | 2 | – | 14 | .125 | 4 | – | 26 | .133 |
| Maine | 2 | – | 14 | .125 | 3 | – | 27 | .100 |
† 2015 America East tournament winner *ineligible for postseason play due to Div. I transition

The 2015 America East men's basketball tournament took place March 4, 8 and 14, 2015. For the 2015 and 2016 tournaments, the entire tournament took place on campus sites with the higher-seeded school hosting each game throughout the championship. The winner of the championship, Albany, earned an automatic bid to the 2015 NCAA tournament.

== Bracket and results ==
Quarterfinals; Wednesday, March 4, 2015; ESPN3
1 | Albany | 83
8 | Maine | 66
4 | New Hampshire | 67*
5 | Hartford | 63
2 | Vermont | 66
7 | UMBC | 39
3 | Stony Brook | 62
6 | Binghamton | 57

Semifinals; Sunday, March 8, 2015; ESPN3
1 | Albany | 60
4 | New Hampshire | 58
2 | Vermont | 77
3 | Stony Brook | 79

Championship; Saturday, March 14, 2015; ESPN2
1 | Albany | 51
3 | Stony Brook | 50

* denotes number of overtime periods

== See also ==
- America East Conference
- 2015 America East women's basketball tournament
