= 2014–15 Stony Brook Seawolves men's basketball team =

American college basketball season

2014–15 Stony Brook Seawolves men's basketball

CBI, First round
- Conference: America East Conference
- Record: 23–12 (12–4 America East)
- Head coach: Steve Pikiell (10th season)
- Assistant coaches: Jay Young (10th season); Lamar Chapman; Dan Rickard
- Home arena: Island Federal Credit Union Arena

2014–15 America East Conference men's basketball standings
	Conf.				Overall
Team	W		L	PCT	W		L	PCT
Albany †	15	–	1	.938	24	–	9	.727
Stony Brook	12	–	4	.750	23	–	12	.657
Vermont	12	–	4	.750	20	–	14	.588
New Hampshire	11	–	5	.688	19	–	13	.594
Hartford	7	–	9	.438	14	–	16	.467
UMass Lowell*	6	–	10	.375	12	–	17	.414
Binghamton	5	–	11	.313	6	–	26	.188
UMBC	2	–	14	.125	4	–	26	.133
Maine	2	–	14	.125	3	–	27	.100
† 2015 America East tournament winner *ineligible for postseason play due to Div. I transition

The 2014–15 Stony Brook Seawolves men's basketball team represented Stony Brook University in the 2014–15 NCAA Division I men's basketball season. They were coached by tenth year head coach Steve Pikiell and played their home games at Island Federal Credit Union Arena. They were members of the America East Conference. They finished the season 23–12, 12–4 in America East play to finish in a tie for second place. They advanced to the championship game of the American East tournament where they lost to Albany. They were invited to the College Basketball Invitational where they lost in the first round to Mercer.

== Roster ==
2014–15 Stony Brook Seawolves men's basketball team
Players
Coaches

Pos.	#	Name	Height	Weight	Year	Hometown
G	1	Deshaun Thrower	6 ft 2 in (1.88 m)	200 lb (91 kg)	Fr	Muskegon, MI
G	3	Kameron Mitchell	6 ft 4 in (1.93 m)	175 lb (79 kg)	So	Jacksonville, FL
G	10	Carson Puriefoy	6 ft 0 in (1.83 m)	175 lb (79 kg)	Jr	Wenonah, NJ
F	12	Tyrell Sturdivant	6 ft 7 in (2.01 m)	225 lb (102 kg)	Fr	Chester, PA
F	20	Jameel Warney	6 ft 8 in (2.03 m)	220 lb (100 kg)	Jr	Plainfield, NJ
F	21	Rayshaun McGrew	6 ft 7 in (2.01 m)	230 lb (104 kg)	Jr	Chicago, IL
G/F	22	Bryan Sekunda	6 ft 6 in (1.98 m)	195 lb (88 kg)	Fr	State College, PA
G/F	23	Chris Braley	6 ft 5 in (1.96 m)	205 lb (93 kg)	So	Newport, ME
G/F	24	Roland Nyama	6 ft 6 in (1.98 m)	200 lb (91 kg)	RS Fr	Frankfurt, Germany
F	32	Jakub Petras	6 ft 11 in (2.11 m)	250 lb (113 kg)	Fr	Rajec, Slovakia
G	33	Ryan Burnett	6 ft 4 in (1.93 m)	190 lb (86 kg)	So	Richmond, VA
G	34	Lucas Woodhouse	6 ft 2 in (1.88 m)	175 lb (79 kg)	Jr	Greenlawn, NY
F	35	Scott King	6 ft 10 in (2.08 m)	220 lb (100 kg)	Jr	Plymouth, NH

Head coach

- Steve Pikiell

Assistant coach(es)

- Jay Young (Marist)
- Lamar Chapman
- Dan Rickard

Legend

- (C) Team captain
- (S) Suspended
- (I) Ineligible
- (W) Walk-on
- Injured
- Current redshirt

Roster
Last update: October 4, 2014

== Schedule ==
Date time, TV	Opponent	Result	Record	Site (attendance) city, state
Non-conference regular season
11/14/2014*; 7:00 pm, AETV	Columbia	W 57–56	1–0	Island Federal Credit Union Arena (4,009); Stony Brook, NY
11/18/2014*; 7:00 pm, SECN	at Georgia; NIT Season Tip-Off	L 70–80	1–1	Stegeman Coliseum (4,787); Athens, GA
11/21/2014*; 7:00 pm	at Hofstra	L 65–66	1–2	Mack Sports Complex (2,726); Hempstead, NY
11/23/2014*; 2:00 pm	U.S. Merchant Marine	W 89–54	2–2	Island Federal Credit Union Arena (2,501); Stony Brook, NY
11/25/2014*; 7:00 pm, AETV	WKU; NIT Season Tip-Off	W 71–61	3–2	Island Federal Credit Union Arena (2,252); Stony Brook, NY
11/27/2014*; 4:00 pm, ESPNU	vs. LIU Brooklyn; NIT Season Tip-Off	W 73–54	4–2	Madison Square Garden (N/A); New York City, NY
11/29/2014*; 2:00 pm, AETV	St. Thomas Aquinas; NIT Season Tip-Off	W 70–49	5–2	Island Federal Credit Union Arena (2,159); Stony Brook, NY
12/02/2014*; 7:00 pm, FSOH/ESPN3	at Cincinnati	L 52–78	5–3	Fifth Third Arena (6,603); Cincinnati, OH
12/06/2014*; 4:30 pm	at Princeton	L 64–77	5–4	Jadwin Gymnasium (1,968); Princeton, NJ
12/13/2014*; 12:00 pm, FSN	at Providence	L 61–79	5–5	Dunkin' Donuts Center (5,132); Providence, RI
12/18/2014*; 7:00 pm	at Canisius	L 59–60 ^{OT}	5–6	Koessler Athletic Center (877); Buffalo, NY
12/21/2014*; 2:00 pm, AETV	Loyola (MD)	W 67–52	6–6	Island Federal Credit Union Arena (2,552); Stony Brook, NY
12/23/2014*; 7:00 pm, AETV	American	W 59–47	7–6	Island Federal Credit Union Arena (N/A); Stony Brook, NY
12/28/2014*; 8:00 pm, P12N	at No. 13 Washington	W 62–57	8–6	Alaska Airlines Arena (6,970); Seattle, WA
01/03/2015; 2:00 pm, AETV	New Hampshire	W 71–61	9–6 (1–0)	Island Federal Credit Union Arena (3,224); Stony Brook, NY
01/06/2015*; 7:00 pm	at Columbia	W 70–61	10–6	Levien Gymnasium (822); New York City, NY
America East regular season
01/10/2015; 12:00 pm, ESPN3	at Vermont	L 57–71	10–7 (1–1)	Patrick Gym (2,475); Burlington, VT
01/14/2015; 7:00 pm, AETV	UMBC	W 64–54	11–7 (2–1)	Island Federal Credit Union Arena (2,467); Stony Brook, NY
01/17/2015; 2:00 pm	at Maine	W 82–39	12–7 (3–1)	Cross Insurance Center (1,723); Bangor, ME
01/19/2015; 7:00 pm, ESPN3	Albany	L 47–64	12–8 (3–2)	Island Federal Credit Union Arena (3,434); Stony Brook, NY
01/22/2015; 5:30 pm	at UMass Lowell	W 65–45	13–8 (4–2)	Costello Athletic Center (341); Lowell, MA
01/25/2015; 2:30 pm	at Binghamton	W 61–54	14–8 (5–2)	Binghamton University Events Center (2,247); Vestal, NY
01/28/2015; 7:30 pm, ESPN3	Hartford	W 72–66	15–8 (6–2)	Island Federal Credit Union Arena (2,816); Stony Brook, NY
01/31/2015; 12:00 pm	at New Hampshire	L 48–63	15–9 (6–3)	Lundholm Gym (1,013); Durham, NH
02/07/2015; 7:00 pm, ESPN3	Vermont	L 48–57	15–10 (6–4)	Island Federal Credit Union Arena (3,872); Stony Brook, NY
02/11/2015; 7:00 pm, ESPN3	at UMBC	W 73–61	16–10 (7–4)	Retriever Activities Center (712); Catonsville, MD
02/14/2015; 2:00 pm, ESPN3	Maine	W 80–52	17–10 (8–4)	Island Federal Credit Union Arena (2,901); Stony Brook, NY
02/17/2015; 7:00 pm, ESPN3	at Albany	W 59–56	18–10 (9–4)	SEFCU Arena (3,886); Albany, NY
02/21/2015; 2:00 pm, ESPN3	Binghamton	W 64–52	19–10 (10–4)	Island Federal Credit Union Arena (3,724); Stony Brook, NY
02/25/2015; 7:00 pm	UMass Lowell	W 75–60	20–10 (11–4)	Island Federal Credit Union Arena (2,581); Stony Brook, NY
02/28/2015; 7:00 pm	at Hartford	W 74–59	21–10 (12–4)	Chase Arena at Reich Family Pavilion (2,431); Hartford, CT
America East tournament
03/04/2015; 7:00 pm, ESPN3	Binghamton; Quarterfinals	W 62–57	22–10	Island Federal Credit Union Arena (3,289); Stony Brook, NY
03/08/2015; 1:00 pm, ESPN3	at Vermont; Semifinals	W 79–77	23–10	Patrick Gym (2,674); Burlington, VT
03/14/2015; 11:00 am, ESPN2	at Albany; Championship game	L 50–51	23–11	SEFCU Arena (4,468); Albany, NY
College Basketball Invitational
03/18/2015*; 7:00 pm	at Mercer; First round	L 70–72	23–12	Hawkins Arena (2,432); Macon, GA
*Non-conference game. ^{#}Rankings from AP Poll. (#) Tournament seedings in parentheses. All times are in Eastern Time.
