= 2014–15 Vermont Catamounts men's basketball team =

American college basketball season

2014–15 Vermont Catamounts men's basketball

CBI, Semifinals
- Conference: America East Conference
- Record: 20–14 (12–4 America East)
- Head coach: John Becker (4th season)
- Assistant coaches: Kyle Cieplicki; Ryan Schneider; Hamlet Tibbs
- Home arena: Patrick Gym

2014–15 America East Conference men's basketball standings
	Conf.				Overall
Team	W		L	PCT	W		L	PCT
Albany †	15	–	1	.938	24	–	9	.727
Stony Brook	12	–	4	.750	23	–	12	.657
Vermont	12	–	4	.750	20	–	14	.588
New Hampshire	11	–	5	.688	19	–	13	.594
Hartford	7	–	9	.438	14	–	16	.467
UMass Lowell*	6	–	10	.375	12	–	17	.414
Binghamton	5	–	11	.313	6	–	26	.188
UMBC	2	–	14	.125	4	–	26	.133
Maine	2	–	14	.125	3	–	27	.100
† 2015 America East tournament winner *ineligible for postseason play due to Div. I transition

The 2014–15 Vermont Catamounts men's basketball team represented the University of Vermont during the 2014–15 NCAA Division I men's basketball season. The Catamounts, led by fourth year head coach John Becker, played their home games at Patrick Gym and were members of the America East Conference. They finished the season 20–14, 12–4 in America East play to finish in a tie for second place. They advanced to the semifinals of the America East tournament where they lost to Stony Brook. They were invited to the College Basketball Invitational where they defeated Hofstra in the first round and Radford in the quarterfinals before losing in the semifinals to Louisiana–Monroe.

== Roster ==
2014–15 Vermont Catamounts men's basketball team
Players
Coaches

Pos.	#	Name	Height	Weight	Year	Previous school	Hometown
G	0	Brandon Hatton	6 ft 3 in (1.91 m)	206 lb (93 kg)	Fr	Dixie Heights	Independence, Kentucky
F	1	Zach McRoberts	6 ft 6 in (1.98 m)	201 lb (91 kg)	Fr	Carmel	Carmel, Indiana
G	2	Trae Bell-Haynes	6 ft 2 in (1.88 m)	170 lb (77 kg)	Fr	Bill Crothers Secondary	Toronto, Ontario
F/C	3	Ryan Pierson	6 ft 10 in (2.08 m)	230 lb (104 kg)	RS Sr	Christian Brothers; Northeastern	St. Louis, Missouri
G	4	David Urso (W)	6 ft 2 in (1.88 m)	195 lb (88 kg)	Fr	Central Catholic	Pittsburgh, Pennsylvania
F	5	Hector Harold	6 ft 7 in (2.01 m)	205 lb (93 kg)	RS Sr	Northfield Mount Hermon; Pepperdine	Pasadena, California
F	12	Darren Payen (redshirt)	6 ft 8 in (2.03 m)	217 lb (98 kg)	Jr	Hamden Hall; Hofstra	Milford, Connecticut
G	14	Cam Ward	6 ft 2 in (1.88 m)	155 lb (70 kg)	Fr	Marshall	Marshall, Wisconsin
G/F	15	Brendan Kilpatrick	6 ft 5 in (1.96 m)	201 lb (91 kg)	RS So	Malvern Prep	Norristown, Pennsylvania
G	20	Ernie Duncan (redshirt)	6 ft 3 in (1.91 m)	192 lb (87 kg)	Fr	Harrison	Evansville, Indiana
G	24	Dre Wills	6 ft 1 in (1.85 m)	177 lb (80 kg)	So	Mercersburg Academy	Indianapolis, Indiana
F	25	Drew Urquhart	6 ft 8 in (2.03 m)	219 lb (99 kg)	Fr	Eastside Catholic	Vancouver, British Columbia
F	32	Ethan O'Day	6 ft 9 in (2.06 m)	201 lb (91 kg)	Jr	E. O. Smith/Northfield Mount Hermon	Mansfield, Connecticut
F	34	Kurt Steidl	6 ft 6 in (1.98 m)	181 lb (82 kg)	So	Ridgefield	Ridgefield, Connecticut

Head coach

- John Becker

Assistant coach(es)

- Kyle Cieplicki
- Ryan Schneider
- Hamlet Tibbs

Legend

- (C) Team captain
- (S) Suspended
- (I) Ineligible
- (W) Walk-on
- Injured
- Current redshirt

Roster
Last update: October 15, 2014

== Schedule ==
Date time, TV	Opponent	Result	Record	Site (attendance) city, state
Exhibition
11/01/2014*; 7:00 pm	Concordia (Quebec)	W 80–57		Patrick Gym (2,036); Burlington, Vermont
11/08/2014*; 4:00 pm	Saint Michael's	L 61–63		Patrick Gym (2,514); Burlington, Vermont
Regular season
11/15/2014*; 2:00 pm	at Canisius	L 60–64	0–1	Koessler Athletic Center (1,340); Buffalo, New York
11/17/2014*; 7:00 pm	at Siena	W 84–76	1–1	Times Union Center (5,964); Albany, New York
11/19/2014*; 7:00 pm	Southern Vermont	W 86–41	2–1	Patrick Gym (1,863); Burlington, Vermont
11/22/2014*; 7:00 pm	at Saint Joseph's	L 60–68	2–2	Hagan Arena (3,851); Philadelphia, Pennsylvania
11/26/2014*; 7:00 pm	Bryant	W 73–47	3–2	Patrick Gym (1,906); Burlington, Vermont
11/30/2014*; 1:00 pm	at Quinnipiac	L 73–89	3–3	TD Bank Sports Center (1,013); Hamden, Connecticut
12/03/2014; 7:00 pm	Hartford	W 81–69	4–3 (1–0)	Patrick Gym (1,930); Burlington, Vermont
12/06/2014*; 7:00 pm	Harvard	L 52–64 ^{2OT}	4–4	Patrick Gym (2,628); Burlington, Vermont
12/14/2014*; 1:00 pm	Wagner	W 61–47	5–4	Patrick Gym (2,038); Burlington, Vermont
12/18/2014*; 7:00 pm	Yale	L 56–57	5–5	Patrick Gym (1,761); Burlington, Vermont
12/21/2014*; 1:00 pm	at Saint Louis	L 55–58	5–6	Chaifetz Arena (6,818); St. Louis, Missouri
12/30/2014*; 11:30 pm, P12N	at USC	L 56–64	5–7	Galen Center (4,553); Los Angeles, California
01/02/2015*; 10:00 pm	at UC Santa Barbara	L 57–64	5–8	The Thunderdome (1,966); Santa Barbara, California
01/07/2015; 7:00 pm	at Maine	W 68–54	6–8 (2–0)	Cross Insurance Center (1,654); Bangor, Maine
01/10/2015; 12:00 pm, ESPN3	Stony Brook	W 71–57	7–8 (3–0)	Patrick Gym (2,475); Burlington, Vermont
01/14/2015*; 7:00 pm	Dartmouth	W 55–52	8–8	Patrick Gym (2,175); Burlington, Vermont
01/17/2015; 1:00 pm	at UMBC	W 71–54	9–8 (4–0)	Retriever Activities Center (789); Catonsville, Maryland
01/19/2015; 7:00 pm	Binghamton	W 64–44	10–8 (5–0)	Patrick Gym (2,071); Burlington, Vermont
01/22/2015; 7:00 pm	at New Hampshire	L 68–73	10–9 (5–1)	Lundholm Gym (917); Durham, New Hampshire
01/25/2015; 2:00 pm	at UMass Lowell	W 61–50	11–9 (6–1)	Tsongas Center (3,971); Lowell, Massachusetts
01/28/2015; 7:00 pm	Albany	L 44–47	11–10 (6–2)	Patrick Gym (2,369); Burlington, Vermont
01/31/2015; 2:00 pm, ESPN3	at Hartford	W 65–46	12–10 (7–2)	Chase Arena at Reich Family Pavilion (2,078); Hartford, Connecticut
02/03/2015; 7:00 pm	Maine	W 68–49	13–10 (8–2)	Patrick Gym (1,909); Burlington, Vermont
02/07/2015; 7:00 pm, ESPN3	at Stony Brook	W 57–48	14–10 (9–2)	Island Federal Credit Union Arena (3,872); Stony Brook, New York
02/11/2015; 7:00 pm	UMass Lowell	W 96–53	15–10 (10–2)	Patrick Gym (1,884); Burlington, Vermont
02/14/2015; 2:00 pm	UMBC	W 74–51	16–10 (11–2)	Patrick Gym (2,554); Burlington, Vermont
02/18/2015; 7:00 pm	at Binghamton	L 55–57	16–11 (11–3)	Binghamton University Events Center (1,856); Vestal, New York
02/25/2015; 7:00 pm, ESPN3	New Hampshire	W 64–49	17–11 (12–3)	Patrick Gym (2,495); Burlington, Vermont
02/28/2015; 7:00 pm	at Albany	L 73–79	17–12 (12–4)	SEFCU Arena (4,212); Albany, New York
America East tournament
03/04/2015; 7:00 pm, ESPN3	UMBC; Quarterfinals	W 66–39	18–12	Patrick Gym (1,925); Burlington, Vermont
03/08/2015; 1:00 pm, ESPN3	Stony Brook; Semifinals	L 77–79	18–13	Patrick Gym (2,674); Burlington, Vermont
College Basketball Invitational
03/18/2015*; 7:00 pm	at Hofstra; First round	W 85–81	19–13	Mack Sports Complex (958); Hempstead, New York
03/23/2015*; 7:00 pm	Radford; Quarterfinals	W 78–71	20–13	Patrick Gym (2,252); Burlington, Vermont
03/25/2015*; 8:00 pm	at Louisiana–Monroe; Semifinals	L 65–71	20–14	Fant–Ewing Coliseum (3,368); Monroe, Louisiana
*Non-conference game. ^{#}Rankings from AP Poll. (#) Tournament seedings in parentheses. All times are in Eastern Time.
