= 2014–15 Maine Black Bears men's basketball team =

American college basketball season

2014–15 Maine Black Bears men's basketball
- Conference: America East Conference
- Record: 3–27 (2–14 America East)
- Head coach: Bob Walsh (1st season)
- Assistant coaches: Matt O'Brien; Zak Boisvert; Antone Gray
- Home arena: Cross Insurance Center

2014–15 America East Conference men's basketball standings
	Conf.				Overall
Team	W		L	PCT	W		L	PCT
Albany †	15	–	1	.938	24	–	9	.727
Stony Brook	12	–	4	.750	23	–	12	.657
Vermont	12	–	4	.750	20	–	14	.588
New Hampshire	11	–	5	.688	19	–	13	.594
Hartford	7	–	9	.438	14	–	16	.467
UMass Lowell*	6	–	10	.375	12	–	17	.414
Binghamton	5	–	11	.313	6	–	26	.188
UMBC	2	–	14	.125	4	–	26	.133
Maine	2	–	14	.125	3	–	27	.100
† 2015 America East tournament winner *ineligible for postseason play due to Div. I transition

The 2014–15 Maine Black Bears men's basketball team represented the University of Maine during the 2014–15 NCAA Division I men's basketball season. The Black Bears, led by first-year head coach Bob Walsh, played their home games at Cross Insurance Center and were members of the America East Conference. They finished the season 3–27, 2–14 in America East play to finish in a tie for eighth place. They lost in the quarterfinals of the America East tournament to Albany.

== Previous season ==
The Black Bears finished the 2013–14 season with an 6–23 overall record and 4–12 in conference play. They finished in a three-way tie for last place in America East play. They lost in the quarterfinals of the America East tournament to Stony Brook.

== Preseason ==
Maine was picked to finish eighth in the preseason America East poll.

== Roster ==
Number	Name	Position	Height	Weight	Year	Hometown
1	Aaron Calixte	Guard	5–11	175	Freshman	Stoughton, Massachusetts
2	Kevin Little	Guard	6–0	160	Freshman	Wyandanch, New York
3	Christian Ejiga	Forward	6–8	225	Sophomore	Lagos, Nigeria
4	Marko Pirovic	Forward	6–7	205	Sophomore	Bolton, Ontario
5	Zarko Valjarevic	Forward	6–4	210	Senior	Belgrade, Serbia
10	Shaun Lawton	Guard	6–5	190	Junior	Harlem, New York
11	Erik Nissen	Forward	6–9	215	Sophomore	Quispamsis, New Brunswick
12	C.J. Ward	Guard	5–11	170	Sophomore	Plymouth, Massachusetts
13	Stefan Micovic	Forward	6–9	210	Junior	Pondov, Serbia
22	Garvey Melmed	Guard	6–1	175	Freshman	Greenbush, Maine
25	Till Gloger	Forward	6–8	220	Junior	Bochum, Germany
31	Troy Reid-Knight	Guard	6–0	190	Sophomore	Vaughan, Ontario
33	Ethan Mackay	Forward	6–7	220	RS–Junior	Voorheesville, New York
54	Peter Westra	Guard	6–5	180	Senior	New Gloucester, Maine
55	Garet Beal	Guard/Forward	6–6	215	Freshman	Beals, Maine

== Schedule ==
Date time, TV	Opponent	Result	Record	Site (attendance) city, state
Exhibition
11/01/2014*; 7:30 pm	at Southern Maine	L 73–78		Hill Gymnasium; Gorham, ME
11/06/2014*; 7:00 pm	Husson	W 98–58		Cross Insurance Center (1,617); Bangor, ME
Regular season
11/15/2014*; 4:30 pm, FS2	at Butler	L 57–99	0–1	Hinkle Fieldhouse (7,652); Indianapolis, IN
11/17/2014*; 7:00 pm	at NJIT	L 86–90	0–2	Fleisher Center (775); Newark, NJ
11/21/2014*; 7:00 pm	at Central Michigan; Central Michigan Tournament	L 48–76	0–3	McGuirk Arena (2,115); Mount Pleasant, MI
11/23/2014*; 3:00 pm	vs. Valparaiso; Central Michigan Tournament	L 70–93	0–4	McGuirk Arena (1,556); Mount Pleasant, MI
11/30/2014*; 1:00 pm, ESPN3	at Northern Illinois	L 56–61	0–5	Convocation Center (716); DeKalb, IL
12/02/2014*; 1:00 pm	Wagner	W 82–81 ^{OT}	1–5	Cross Insurance Center (851); Bangor, ME
12/06/2014*; 3:00 pm	at Dartmouth	L 51–74	1–6	Leede Arena (631); Hanover, NH
12/09/2014*; 7:00 pm	LIU Brooklyn	L 70–83	1–7	Cross Insurance Center (997); Bangor, ME
12/11/2014*; 7:00 pm, ESPN3	at Boston College	L 74–85	1–8	Conte Forum (2,133); Chestnut Hill, MA
12/21/2014*; 1:00 pm	at Army	L 69–72 ^{OT}	1–9	Christl Arena (880); West Point, NY
12/27/2014*; 12:00 pm, FS1	at Seton Hall	L 43–72	1–10	Walsh Gymnasium (1,833); South Orange, NJ
12/29/2014*; 7:00 pm	at Quinnipiac	L 64–81	1–11	TD Bank Sports Center (1,402); Hamden, CT
01/03/2015; 7:00 pm	at Albany	L 56–80	1–12 (0–1)	SEFCU Arena (2,459); Albany, NY
01/07/2015; 7:00 pm	Vermont	L 54–68	1–13 (0–2)	Cross Insurance Center (1,654); Bangor, ME
01/10/2015; 2:15 pm	at Binghamton	L 46–65	1–14 (0–3)	Binghamton University Events Center (2,547); Vestal, NY
01/13/2015; 7:00 pm	UMass Lowell	L 59–62	1–15 (0–4)	Cross Insurance Center (1,069); Bangor, ME
01/17/2015; 2:00 pm	Stony Brook	L 39–82	1–16 (0–5)	Cross Insurance Center (1,723); Bangor, ME
01/19/2015*; 1:00 pm	NJIT	L 55–65	1–17	Cross Insurance Center (2,417); Bangor, ME
01/22/2015; 8:00 pm	UMBC	L 59–76	1–18 (0–6)	Cross Insurance Center (1,994); Bangor, ME
01/25/2015; 2:00 pm	at Hartford	W 70–61	2–18 (1–6)	Chase Arena at Reich Family Pavilion (1,926); Hartford, CT
01/28/2015; 7:00 pm	New Hampshire	L 58–63	2–19 (1–7)	Cross Insurance Center (1,106); Bangor, ME
01/31/2015; 2:00 pm	Albany	L 59–77	2–20 (1–8)	Cross Insurance Center (1,220); Bangor, ME
02/03/2015; 7:00 pm	at Vermont	L 49–68	2–21 (1–9)	Patrick Gym (1,909); Burlington, VT
02/07/2015; 1:00 pm	Binghamton	W 67–64	3–21 (2–9)	Cross Insurance Center (1,158); Bangor, ME
02/14/2015; 2:00 pm, ESPN3	at Stony Brook	L 52–80	3–22 (2–10)	Island Federal Credit Union Arena (2,901); Stony Brook, NY
02/18/2015; 7:00 pm	at UMass Lowell	L 71–82	3–23 (2–11)	Costello Athletic Center (418); Lowell, MA
02/21/2015; 1:00 pm	at UMBC	L 66–73	3–24 (2–12)	Retriever Activities Center (945); Catonsville, MD
02/25/2015; 7:00 pm	Hartford	L 60–63	3–25 (2–13)	Cross Insurance Center (1,544); Bangor, ME
02/28/2015; 1:00 pm	at New Hampshire	L 56–65	3–26 (2–14)	Lundholm Gym (1,713); Durham, NH
America East tournament
03/04/2015; 7:00 pm, ESPN3	at Albany; Quarterfinals	L 66–83	3–27	SEFCU Arena (2,966); Albany, NY
*Non-conference game. ^{#}Rankings from AP Poll. (#) Tournament seedings in parentheses. All times are in Eastern Time.
