= 2015 College Basketball Invitational =

College basketball tournament

- Teams: 16
- Finals site: Joseph J. Gentile Arena; Fant–Ewing Coliseum; Chicago, Illinois; Monroe, Louisiana
- Champions: Loyola-Chicago Ramblers (1st title)
- Runner-up: Louisiana–Monroe Warhawks (1st title game)
- Semifinalists: Seattle Redhawks (1st semifinal); Vermont Catamounts (1st semifinal)
- Winning coach: Porter Moser (1st title)
- MVP: Earl Peterson (Loyola-Chicago)
- Attendance: 30,963

The 2015 College Basketball Invitational (CBI) was a single-elimination tournament of 16 NCAA Division I teams that did not participate in the NCAA tournament or the NIT. The opening games and the quarterfinals were held in mid-March on the home courts of participating teams. After the quarterfinals, the bracket were reseeded. A best-of-three championship series between the two finalist teams was held, with Loyola-Chicago winning the title with a two-game sweep. One change from this year's CBI Tournament was the use of a 30-second shot clock (instead of a 35-second clock).

== Participants ==
The following teams were announced as participants Sunday, March 15 after the NCAA Selection Show.

Team	Conference	Overall record	Conference record
Colorado	Pac-12	15–17	7–11
Delaware State	MEAC	18–17	9–7
Eastern Michigan	MAC	21–13	8–10
Gardner–Webb	Big South	20–14	10–8
Hofstra	CAA	20–13	10–8
Louisiana–Monroe	Sun Belt	21–12	15–7
Loyola-Chicago	MVC	19–13	8–10
Mercer	SoCon	18–15	12–6
Oral Roberts	Summit	18–14	10–6
Pepperdine	WCC	18–13	10–8
Radford	Big South	21–11	12–6
Rider	MAAC	21–11	15–5
Seattle	WAC	16–15	7–7
Stony Brook	America East	23–11	12–4
UC Santa Barbara	Big West	19–13	11–5
Vermont	America East	18–13	12–4

=== Declined invitations ===
The following programs declined to participate in the 2015 CBI:

- California
- Florida
- Florida State
- Indiana
- Kansas State
- Memphis
- Minnesota
- Northwestern
- Oregon State
- Penn State
- Pittsburgh
- South Carolina
- TCU
- Tennessee

== Schedule ==
Date	Time*	Matchup	Television	Score	Attendance
First round
March 17	8:00 pm	Rider at **Loyola–Chicago**	ESPN3	59–62	1,105
March 18	7:00 pm	**Vermont** at Hofstra		85–81	958
March 18	7:00 pm	Stony Brook at **Mercer**	ESPN3	70–72	2,432
March 18	8:00 pm	**Radford** at Delaware State		78–57	1,038
March 18	8:00 pm	Eastern Michigan at **Louisiana–Monroe**		67–71	3,003
March 18	8:00 pm	UC Santa Barbara at **Oral Roberts**		87–91	1,687
March 18	9:00 pm	Gardner–Webb at **Colorado**	P12 Digital	78–87	1,280
March 18	10:00 pm	Pepperdine at **Seattle**	WAC Digital	45–62	999
Quarterfinals
March 23	7:00 pm	**Louisiana–Monroe** at Mercer	ESPN3	71–69	2,677
March 23	7:00 pm	Radford at **Vermont**	NSN	71–78	2,252
March 23	8:00 pm	Oral Roberts at **Loyola-Chicago**	ESPN3	78–86	1,225
March 23	10:00 pm	Colorado at **Seattle**	WAC Digital	72–65	999
Semifinals
March 25	8:00 pm	Vermont at **Louisiana–Monroe**		65–71	3,368
March 25	8:00 pm	Seattle at **Loyola-Chicago**	ESPN3	48–63	1,265
Finals
March 30	8:00 pm	Louisiana–Monroe at **Loyola-Chicago**	CBSSN	58–65	2,215
April 1	8:00 pm	**Loyola-Chicago** at Louisiana–Monroe	CBSSN	63–62	4,460
All game times in Eastern Daylight Time (EDT). Winning team in **bold**.

== Bracket ==
First round March 17–18
UC Santa Barbara	87
Oral Roberts	91
Rider	59
Loyola-Chicago	62
Gardner–Webb	78
Colorado	87
Pepperdine	45
Seattle	62
Eastern Michigan	67
Louisiana–Monroe	71
Stony Brook	70
Mercer	72
Radford	78
Delaware State	57
Vermont	85
Hofstra	81

Quarterfinals; March 23
Oral Roberts	78
Loyola-Chicago	86
Colorado	65
Seattle	72
Louisiana–Monroe	71
Mercer	69
Radford	71
Vermont	78

Semifinals (Reseeded); March 25
Seattle	48
Loyola-Chicago	63
Vermont	65
Louisiana–Monroe	71

Finals (Best of three); March 30, April 1
Loyola-Chicago	65	63	–
Louisiana–Monroe	58	62	–

Home teams listed second.
