= 2014–15 NJIT Highlanders men's basketball team =

American college basketball season

2014–15 NJIT Highlanders men's basketball

CIT, Semifinals
- Conference: Independent
- Record: 21–12
- Head coach: Jim Engles (7th season)
- Assistant coaches: Brian Kennedy; Jesse Agel; Dino Presley
- Home arena: Fleisher Center

2014–15 NCAA Division I men's basketball independents standings
	Conf.				Overall
Team	W		L	PCT	W		L	PCT
NJIT		–		–	21	–	12	.636

The 2014–15 NJIT Highlanders men's basketball team represented the New Jersey Institute of Technology during the 2014–15 NCAA Division I men's basketball season. The Highlanders, led by seventh-year head coach Jim Engles, played their home games at the Fleisher Center and were in their second year as an Independent.

On December 6, 2014, NJIT defeated then-#17 Michigan in the program's first game against a top 25 team.

After starting the season with 5 wins and 9 losses in their first 14 games, the Highlanders won 13 of their next 15 games to improve to 18–11 and earn an invitation to the 2015 CollegeInsider.com Postseason Tournament (CIT), the first Division I postseason berth in school history. In the CIT, they defeated New Hampshire, Cleveland State, and Canisius to advance to the semifinals, where they lost to Northern Arizona. They finished with a record of 21–12.

This was the Highlanders' final season as a Division I independent; as on July 1, 2015, NJIT joined the Atlantic Sun Conference.

== Roster ==
Number	Name	Position	Height	Weight	Year	Hometown
0	Ky Howard	Guard	6–4	185	Junior	Philadelphia, Pennsylvania
2	Tim Coleman	Guard	6–5	210	Sophomore	Union, New Jersey
3	Chris Jenkins	Guard/Forward	6–4	215	Sophomore	Hillside, New Jersey
5	Damon Lynn	Guard	5–11	165	Sophomore	Hillside, New Jersey
10	Daquan Holiday	Forward	6–8	205	Senior	Allentown, Pennsylvania
11	Winfield Willis	Guard	6–0	180	Junior	Baltimore, Maryland
15	Terrence Smith	Forward	6–6	195	Junior	Fort Lauderdale, Florida
22	Odera Nweke	Forward	6–5	220	Senior	Richmond, Texas
23	Osa Izevbuwa	Guard	6–3	230	Sophomore	Staten Island, New York
24	Emmanuel Tselentakis	Guard	6–5	205	Junior	Thessaloniki, Greece
25	Rob Ukawuba	Guard	6–3	210	Sophomore	East Brunswick, New Jersey
33	Vlad Shustov	Forward	6–10	225	RS Freshman	Tomsk, Russia

== Schedule ==
Date time, TV	Opponent	Result	Record	Site (attendance) city, state
Regular season
11/14/2014*; 7:00 pm, FSN	at St. John's	L 58–77	0–1	Carnesecca Arena (4,703); Queens, NY
11/17/2014*; 7:00 pm	Maine	W 90–86	1–1	Fleisher Center (775); Newark, NJ
11/19/2014*; 7:00 pm	at Albany	L 48–65	1–2	SEFCU Arena (2,583); Albany, NY
11/22/2014*; 2:00 pm	UMass Lowell	L 61–63	1–3	Fleisher Center (500); Newark, NJ
11/24/2014*; 9:00 pm, FS1	at Marquette	L 57–62	1–4	BMO Harris Bradley Center (11,966); Milwaukee, WI
11/29/2014*; 2:00 pm	at Duquesne	W 84–81	2–4	Palumbo Center (1,563); Pittsburgh, PA
12/03/2014*; 7:00 pm	at UMass Lowell	L 67–71	2–5	Costello Athletic Center (387); Lowell, MA
12/06/2014*; 12:00 pm, BTN	at No. 17 Michigan	W 72–70	3–5	Crisler Center (12,226); Ann Arbor, MI
12/09/2014*; 7:30 pm	St. Francis Brooklyn	W 68–66	4–5	Fleisher Center (1,372); Newark, NJ
12/12/2014*; 7:00 pm	at Holy Cross	L 66–76	4–6	Hart Center (1,674); Worcester, MA
12/14/2014*; 3:30 pm	at LIU Brooklyn	L 49–65	4–7	Steinberg Wellness Center (1,419); Brooklyn, NY
12/20/2014*; 7:00 pm	at Central Connecticut	W 84–76	5–7	William H. Detrick Gymnasium (1,117); New Britain, CT
12/23/2014*; 7:00 pm, FS1	at No. 7 Villanova	L 67–92	5–8	The Pavilion (6,500); Villanova, PA
12/28/2014*; 2:00 pm	at Lafayette	L 71–76	5–9	Kirby Sports Center (1,732); Easton, PA
12/30/2014*; 7:00 pm	Saint Francis (PA)	W 77–65	6–9	Fleisher Center (704); Newark, NJ
01/02/2015*; 7:00 pm	at UMBC	W 70–55	7–9	Retriever Activities Center (713); Catonsville, MD
01/07/2015*; 7:00 pm	Maryland Eastern Shore	W 69–60	8–9	Fleisher Center (776); Newark, NJ
01/09/2015*; 7:00 pm	Yale	W 78–71	9–9	Fleisher Center (780); Newark, NJ
01/14/2015*; 7:00 pm	St. Joseph's (Brooklyn)	W 79–60	10–9	Fleisher Center (411); Newark, NJ
01/17/2015*; 4:00 pm	at Dartmouth	L 53–62	10–10	Leede Arena (775); Hanover, NH
01/19/2015*; 1:00 pm	at Maine	W 65–55	11–10	Cross Insurance Center (2,417); Bangor, ME
01/25/2015*; 3:00 pm	at South Alabama	W 72–55	12–10	Mitchell Center (1,909); Mobile, AL
02/02/2015*; 7:00 pm	Hampton	W 86–67	13–10	Fleisher Center (511); Newark, NJ
02/03/2015*; 7:30 pm	Delaware State	W 69–51	14–10	Fleisher Center (937); Newark, NJ
02/07/2015*; 4:00 pm	Fisher	W 96–70	15–10	Fleisher Center (600); Newark, NJ
02/13/2015*; 7:00 pm	Albany	L 59–65	15–11	Fleisher Center (1,500); Newark, NJ
02/16/2015*; 7:00 pm	Maine–Fort Kent	W 89–55	16–11	Fleisher Center (516); Newark, NJ
02/28/2015*; 2:00 pm	Sarah Lawrence	W 90–55	17–11	Fleisher Center (505); Newark, NJ
03/04/2015*; 7:00 pm	at Howard	W 71–62	18–11	Burr Gymnasium (705); Washington, D.C.
CIT
03/16/2015*; 7:00 pm	New Hampshire; First round	W 84–77	19–11	Fleisher Center (1,303); Newark, NJ
03/23/2015*; 7:00 pm	Cleveland State; Second round	W 80–77	20–11	Fleisher Center (1,404); Newark, NJ
03/28/2015*; 7:30 pm	Canisius; Quarterfinals	W 78–73	21–11	Fleisher Center (1,505); Newark, NJ
03/31/2015*; 9:00 pm, CBSSN	at Northern Arizona; Semifinals	L 61–68	21–12	Walkup Skydome (5,583); Flagstaff, AZ
*Non-conference game. ^{#}Rankings from AP Poll. (#) Tournament seedings in parentheses. All times are in Eastern Time.
