= 2014–15 UMBC Retrievers men's basketball team =

American college basketball season

2014–15 UMBC Retrievers men's basketball
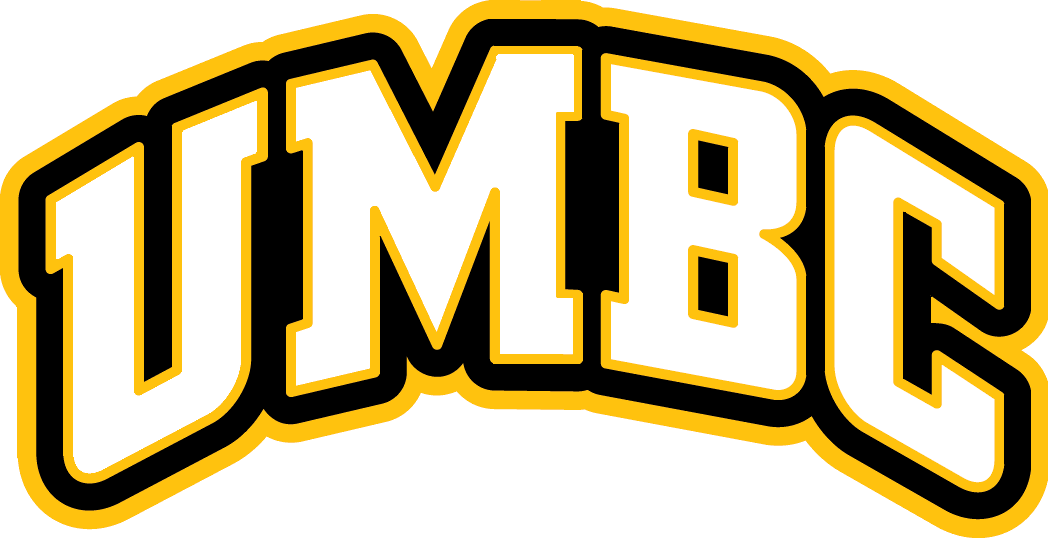
- Conference: America East Conference
- Record: 4–26 (2–14 America East)
- Head coach: Aki Thomas (3rd season)
- Assistant coaches: John Zito; Frankie Allen; Brian Johnson
- Home arena: Retriever Activities Center

2014–15 America East Conference men's basketball standings
	Conf.				Overall
Team	W		L	PCT	W		L	PCT
Albany †	15	–	1	.938	24	–	9	.727
Stony Brook	12	–	4	.750	23	–	12	.657
Vermont	12	–	4	.750	20	–	14	.588
New Hampshire	11	–	5	.688	19	–	13	.594
Hartford	7	–	9	.438	14	–	16	.467
UMass Lowell*	6	–	10	.375	12	–	17	.414
Binghamton	5	–	11	.313	6	–	26	.188
UMBC	2	–	14	.125	4	–	26	.133
Maine	2	–	14	.125	3	–	27	.100
† 2015 America East tournament winner *ineligible for postseason play due to Div. I transition

The 2014–15 UMBC Retrievers men's basketball team represented the University of Maryland, Baltimore County during the 2014–15 NCAA Division I men's basketball season. The Retrievers, led by third-year head coach Aki Thomas, played their home games at the Retriever Activities Center and were members of the America East Conference. They finished the season 4–26, 2–14 in America East play to finish in a tie for eighth place. They lost in the quarterfinals of the America East tournament to Vermont.

== Roster ==
Number	Name	Position	Height	Weight	Year	Hometown
0	Aaron Morgan	Guard	5–11	185	Junior	Washington, Pennsylvania
1	Rodney Elliott	Guard	6–0	190	Sophomore	Baltimore, Maryland
2	Malcolm Brent	Guard	6–5	190	Freshman	Silver Spring, Maryland
3	Ben Grace	Guard	5–10	185	Sophomore	Baltimore, Maryland
4	Wayne Sparow	Guard	6–3	195	GS Senior	Baltimore, Maryland
5	Jourdan Grant	Guard	6–2	185	Freshman	Bowie, Maryland
11	Charles Taylor, Jr.	Guard/Forward	6–4	185	Sophomore	Silver Spring, Maryland
12	Will Darley	Guard	6–8	205	Sophomore	Timonium, Maryland
23	Devarick Houston	Forward	6–7	195	Senior	Jonesboro, Georgia
33	Malik Garner	Forward	6–6	225	Junior	Philadelphia, Pennsylvania
40	Lamell Washington	Forward	6–6	205	Freshman	Frederick, Maryland
41	Jakob Stenhede	Forward	6–10	205	Freshman	Gothenburg, Sweden
42	Cody Joyce	Forward	6–8	225	Junior	Churchton, Maryland

== Schedule ==
Date time, TV	Opponent	Result	Record	Site (attendance) city, state
Regular season
11/14/2014*; 8:00 pm	at Akron	L 57–74	0–1	James A. Rhodes Arena (3,039); Akron, OH
11/19/2014*; 8:00 pm	at Loyola (MD)	L 38–45	0–2	Reitz Arena (942); Baltimore, MD
11/22/2014*; 8:30 pm	at Minnesota	L 51–69	0–3	Williams Arena (11,212); Minneapolis, MN
11/25/2014*; 7:30 pm	Howard	L 54–68	0–4	Retriever Activities Center (588); Catonsville, MD
11/29/2014*; 1:00 pm	Towson	L 66–77	0–5	Retriever Activities Center (676); Catonsville, MD
12/02/2014*; 7:30 pm	at Maryland Eastern Shore	L 52–65	0–6	Hytche Athletic Center (2,036); Princess Anne, MD
12/04/2014*; 7:00 pm	at George Washington	L 60–83	0–7	Charles E. Smith Center (2,481); Washington, D.C.
12/06/2014*; 1:00 pm	at Iowa	L 47–77	0–8	Carver–Hawkeye Arena (13,094); Iowa City, IA
12/10/2014*; 7:00 pm	at Central Connecticut	L 53–65	0–9	William H. Detrick Gymnasium (1,213); New Britain, CT
12/14/2014*; 5:00 pm	Longwood	W 58–53	1–9	Retriever Activities Center (631); Catonsville, MD
12/20/2014*; 3:00 pm, ESPN3	at Kennesaw State	W 66–53	2–9	KSU Convocation Center (N/A); Kennesaw, GA
12/28/2014*; 5:00 pm	Lehigh	L 55–58	2–10	Retriever Activities Center (521); Catonsville, MD
01/02/2015*; 7:00 pm	NJIT	L 55–70	2–11	Retriever Activities Center (713); Catonsville, MD
01/07/2015; 7:00 pm	UMass Lowell	L 61–73 ^{OT}	2–12 (0–1)	Retriever Activities Center (676); Catonsville, MD
01/11/2015; 1:00 pm	New Hampshire	L 60–63	2–13 (0–2)	Retriever Activities Center (632); Catonsville, MD
01/14/2015; 7:00 pm	at Stony Brook	L 54–64	2–14 (0–3)	Island Federal Credit Union Arena (2,467); Stony Brook, NY
01/17/2015; 1:00 pm	Vermont	L 54–71	2–15 (0–4)	Retriever Activities Center (789); Catonsville, MD
01/19/2015; 1:00 pm	Hartford	L 63–65	2–16 (0–5)	Retriever Activities Center (608); Catonsville, MD
01/22/2015; 8:00 pm	at Maine	W 76–59	3–16 (1–5)	Cross Insurance Center (1,994); Bangor, ME
01/25/2015; 4:30 pm	at Albany	L 55–69	3–17 (1–6)	SEFCU Arena (3,772); Albany, NY
01/28/2015; 7:00 pm	Binghamton	L 56–68	3–18 (1–7)	Retriever Activities Center (748); Catonsville, MD
02/05/2015; 7:00 pm	at UMass Lowell	L 51–67	3–19 (1–8)	Costello Athletic Center (308); Lowell, MA
02/07/2015; 1:00 pm	at New Hampshire	L 46–80	3–20 (1–9)	Lundholm Gym (907); Durham, NH
02/11/2015; 7:00 pm	Stony Brook	L 61–73	3–21 (1–10)	Retriever Activities Center (712); Catonsville, MD
02/14/2015; 1:00 pm	at Vermont	L 51–74	3–22 (1–11)	Patrick Gym (2,554); Burlington, VT
02/17/2015; 7:00 pm	at Hartford	L 52–55	3–23 (1–12)	Chase Arena at Reich Family Pavilion (1,335); Hartford, CT
02/21/2015; 1:00 pm	Maine	W 73–66	4–23 (2–12)	Retriever Activities Center (945); Catonsville, MD
02/25/2015; 7:00 pm	Albany	L 60–67	4–24 (2–13)	Retriever Activities Center (1,010); Catonsville, MD
02/28/2015; 2:00 pm	at Binghamton	L 69–76	4–25 (2–14)	Binghamton University Events Center (2,838); Vestal, NY
America East tournament
03/04/2015; 7:00 pm, ESPN3	at Vermont; Quarterfinals	L 39–66	4–26	Patrick Gym (1,925); Burlington, VT
*Non-conference game. ^{#}Rankings from AP Poll. (#) Tournament seedings in parentheses. All times are in Eastern Time.
