= 2014–15 Albany Great Danes men's basketball team =

American college basketball season

2014–15 Albany Great Danes men's basketball

America East regular season and tournament champions

NCAA tournament, round of 64
- Conference: America East Conference
- Record: 24–9 (15–1 America East)
- Head coach: Will Brown (14th season)
- Assistant coaches: Chad O'Donnell; Jon Iati
- Home arena: SEFCU Arena

2014–15 America East Conference men's basketball standings
	Conf.				Overall
Team	W		L	PCT	W		L	PCT
Albany †	15	–	1	.938	24	–	9	.727
Stony Brook	12	–	4	.750	23	–	12	.657
Vermont	12	–	4	.750	20	–	14	.588
New Hampshire	11	–	5	.688	19	–	13	.594
Hartford	7	–	9	.438	14	–	16	.467
UMass Lowell*	6	–	10	.375	12	–	17	.414
Binghamton	5	–	11	.313	6	–	26	.188
UMBC	2	–	14	.125	4	–	26	.133
Maine	2	–	14	.125	3	–	27	.100
† 2015 America East tournament winner *ineligible for postseason play due to Div. I transition

The 2014–15 Albany Great Danes men's basketball team represented the University at Albany, SUNY during the 2014–15 NCAA Division I men's basketball season. The Great Danes, led by 14th year head coach Will Brown, played their home games at SEFCU Arena and were members of the America East Conference. They finished the season 24–9, 15–1 in America East play to win the American East regular season championship. They defeated Maine, New Hampshire, and Stony Brook to become champions of the America East tournament. They received an automatic bid to the NCAA tournament where they lost in the second round to Oklahoma.

== Roster ==
2014–15 Albany Great Danes men's basketball team
Players
Coaches

Pos.	#	Name	Height	Weight	Year	Previous school	Hometown
G	0	Evan Singletary	6 ft 1 in (1.85 m)	195 lb (88 kg)	Jr	Moberly Area CC	Baltimore, Maryland
G/F	1	Ray Sanders	6 ft 4 in (1.93 m)	210 lb (95 kg)	Jr	Pensacola State College	Tuscaloosa, Alabama
G	2	Tre Green	6 ft 3 in (1.91 m)	190 lb (86 kg)	So	John A. Logan College	Chicago, Illinois
F	10	Mike Rowley	6 ft 8 in (2.03 m)	230 lb (104 kg)	So	Knox Grammar School	Sydney, Australia
G	11	Mike Wells	5 ft 10 in (1.78 m)	170 lb (77 kg)	Fr	St. Thomas More Prep (CT)	Delaware, Ohio
G	12	Peter Hooley	6 ft 4 in (1.93 m)	200 lb (91 kg)	Jr	Concordia College (South Australia)	Hahndorf, South Australia
G	13	Reece Williams	6 ft 1 in (1.85 m)	200 lb (91 kg)	Jr	Woodlands	White Plains, New York
F	14	Sam Rowley	6 ft 6 in (1.98 m)	200 lb (91 kg)	Sr	Knox Grammar School	Sydney, Australia
F	15	Ede Egharevba	6 ft 6 in (1.98 m)	210 lb (95 kg)	Sr	Midland	Queens, New York
G	21	Max Twyman	6 ft 5 in (1.96 m)	200 lb (91 kg)	Fr	Brewster Academy	Rye, New York
C	22	Richard Peters	6 ft 11 in (2.11 m)	275 lb (125 kg)	So	Tallahassee CC	Pickering, Ontario
F	24	Dallas Ennema	6 ft 6 in (1.98 m)	210 lb (95 kg)	So	Sheldon	Sheldon, Iowa
G	25	Wheeler Baker	6 ft 2 in (1.88 m)	175 lb (79 kg)	Fr	Osseo	Minneapolis, Minnesota
F	33	Geremy McKay	6 ft 7 in (2.01 m)	225 lb (102 kg)	Fr	Caulfield Grammar School	Melbourne, Australia
F	43	Greig Stire	6 ft 7 in (2.01 m)	225 lb (102 kg)	Fr	Christian Brothers Academy	Schenectady, New York

Head coach

- Will Brown, 14th yr. (Dowling, 1995)

Assistant coach(es)

- Chad O'Donnell, 11th yr. (Springfield, 1994)
- Jon Iati, 3rd yr. (Albany, 2007)

Legend

- (C) Team captain
- (S) Suspended
- (I) Ineligible
- (W) Walk-on
- Injured
- Current redshirt

Roster
Last update: July 19, 2014

== Schedule ==
Date time, TV	Rank^{#}	Opponent^{#}	Result	Record	High points	High rebounds	High assists	Site (attendance) city, state
Regular season
11/15/2014*; 7:00 pm, FS2		at Providence	L 60–64	0–1	18 – Singletary	7 – Tied	6 – Hooley	Dunkin' Donuts Center (9,599); Providence, RI
11/19/2014*; 7:00 pm		NJIT	W 65–48	1–1	15 – Baker	8 – S. Rowley	3 – Singletary	SEFCU Arena (2,583); Albany, NY
11/22/2014*; 7:00 pm		Quinnipiac	L 73–76 ^{OT}	1–2	17 – Hooley	8 – S. Rowley	5 – Singletary	SEFCU Arena (3,654); Albany, NY
11/26/2014*; 7:00 pm		at Colgate	W 75–71	2–2	18 – S. Rowley	11 – S. Rowley	6 – Hooley	Cotterell Court (474); Hamilton, NY
11/29/2014*; 10:00 pm		at UNLV	L 59–75	2–3	18 – Hooley	10 – S. Rowley	3 – Singletary	Thomas & Mack Center (11,209); Paradise, NV
12/03/2014*; 7:00 pm		Holy Cross	L 57–74	2–4	14 – S. Rowley	6 – Baker	3 – Hooley	SEFCU Arena (2,667); Albany, NY
12/06/2014*; 7:00 pm		at Saint Francis (PA)	L 59–69	2–5	19 – S. Rowley	12 – S. Rowley	3 – Ennema	DeGol Arena (1,142); Loretto, PA
12/08/2014*; 7:00 pm		at Bucknell	L 58–61	2–6	17 – S. Rowley	9 – S. Rowley	2 – Tied	Sojka Pavilion (2,216); Lewisburg, PA
12/13/2014*; 7:00 pm, TWCS		at Siena; Albany Cup	W 77–68	3–6	14 – Tied	9 – Wright	6 – Wright	Times Union Center (10,278); Albany, NY
12/20/2014*; 7:00 pm		at Yale	W 64–60	4–6	19 – Singletary	6 – S. Rowley	3 – Hooley	John J. Lee Amphitheater (882); New Haven, CT
12/22/2014*; 7:00 pm		Fairfield	W 77–66	5–6	21 – Singletary	8 – S. Rowley	5 – Tied	SEFCU Arena (2,143); Albany, NY
12/30/2014*; 7:00 pm, TWCS		at Niagara	L 47–65	5–7	11 – Baker	5 – Tied	2 – Tied	Gallagher Center (1,071); Lewiston, NY
01/03/2015; 7:00 pm		Maine	W 80–56	6–7 (1–0)	14 – S. Rowley	8 – Peters	5 – Tied	SEFCU Arena ( 2,459); Albany, NY
01/06/2015; 7:00 pm		at New Hampshire	W 64–62	7–7 (2–0)	17 – Hooley	8 – Sanders	2 – Tied	Lundholm Gym (485); Durham, NH
01/09/2015; 2:00 pm		at UMass Lowell	W 64–51	8–7 (3–0)	21 – Singletary	6 – Tied	4 – Sanders	Costello Athletic Center (334); Lowell, MA
01/14/2015; 7:00 pm, ESPN3		Binghamton	W 73–58	9–7 (4–0)	16 – Hooley	8 – M. Rowley	7 – Singletary	SEFCU Arena (2,617); Albany, NY
01/19/2015; 7:00 pm, ESPN3		at Stony Brook	W 64–47	10–7 (5–0)	21 – Singletary	13 – S. Rowley	4 – Tied	SEFCU Arena (3,434); Albany, NY
01/22/2015; 7:00 pm, ESPN3		at Hartford	W 62–53	11–7 (6–0)	22 – S. Rowley	8 – S. Rowley	3 – Tied	Chase Arena (1,907); Hartford, CT
01/25/2015; 4:30 pm, TWCS		UMBC	W 69–55	12–7 (7–0)	14 – Baker	8 – Singletary	4 – Singletary	SEFCU Arena (3,772); Albany, NY
01/28/2015; 7:00 pm		at Vermont	W 47–44	13–7 (8–0)	18 – S. Rowley	13 – Sanders	3 – Sanders	Patrick Gym (2,369); Burlington, VT
01/31/2015; 2:00 pm		at Maine	W 77–59	14–7 (9–0)	21 – Tied	7 – Peters	7 – Singletary	Cross Insurance Center (1,220); Bangor, ME
02/04/2015; 7:00 pm, ESPN3		New Hampshire	W 63–62	15–7 (10–0)	15 – Singletary	8 – S. Rowley	2 – Singletary	SEFCU Arena (2,712); Albany, NY
02/07/2015; 7:30 pm		UMass Lowell	W 69–59	16–7 (11–0)	18 – Singletary	11 – S. Rowley	7 – Sanders	SEFCU Arena (4,468); Albany, NY
02/10/2015; 7:00 pm, TWCS		at Binghamton	W 62–46	17–7 (12–0)	20 – S. Rowley	15 – S. Rowley	4 – Tied	Binghamton University Events Center (2,190); Vestal, NY
02/13/2015*; 7:00 pm		at NJIT	W 65–59	18–7	16 – S. Rowley	8 – S. Rowley	3 – Singletary	Fleisher Center (1,500); Newark, NJ
02/17/2015; 7:00 pm, ESPN3		at Stony Brook	L 56–59	18–8 (12–1)	12 – Tied	11 – S. Rowley	5 – Singletary	Island Federal Credit Union Arena (3,886); Albany, NY
02/20/2015; 7:00 pm, ESPNU		Hartford	W 70–64	19–8 (13–1)	19 – Sanders	9 – S. Rowley	5 – Sanders	SEFCU Arena (4,123); Albany, NY
02/25/2015; 7:00 pm		at UMBC	W 67–49	20–8 (14–1)	15 – Tied	11 – S. Rowley	5 – Singleary	Retriever Activities Center (1,010); Catonsville, MD
02/28/2015; 7:00 pm		Vermont	W 79–73	21–8 (15–1)	24 – S. Rowley	7 – S. Rowley	3 – S. Rowley	SEFCU Arena (4,212); Albany, NY
America East tournament
03/04/2015; 7:00 pm, ESPN3		Maine; Quarterfinals	W 83–66	22–8	19 – Singletary	11 – S. Rowley	3 – Tied	SEFCU Arena (2,966); Albany, NY
03/08/2015; 2:00 pm, ESPN3		New Hampshire; Semifinals	W 60–58	23–8	21 – Hooley	8 – Singletary	4 – S. Rowley	SEFCU Arena (4,122); Albany, NY
03/14/2015; 11:00 am, ESPN2		Stony Brook; Championship game	W 51–50	24–8	14 – S. Rowley	7 – Tied	3 – Sanders	SEFCU Arena (4,468); Albany, NY
NCAA tournament
03/20/2015*; 7:27 pm, truTV	(14 E)	vs. (3 E) No. 13 Oklahoma; Second round	L 60–69	24–9	15 – Hooley	7 – Sanders	4 – Tied	Nationwide Arena (17,584); Columbus, OH
*Non-conference game. ^{#}Rankings from AP poll. (#) Tournament seedings in parentheses. E=East region. All times are in Eastern Time.
