= 2014–15 UMass Lowell River Hawks men's basketball team =

American college basketball season

2014–15 UMass Lowell River Hawks men's basketball
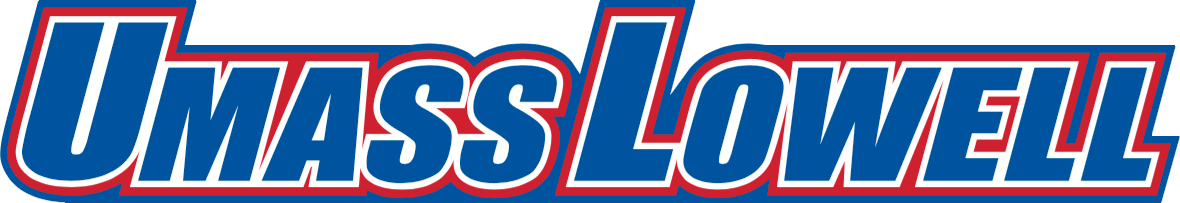
- Conference: America East Conference
- Record: 12–17 (6–10 America East)
- Head coach: Pat Duquette (2nd season)
- Assistant coaches: Michael Harding; Biko Paris; Nick Leonardelli
- Home arena: Costello Athletic Center; Tsongas Center at UMass Lowell

2014–15 America East Conference men's basketball standings
	Conf.				Overall
Team	W		L	PCT	W		L	PCT
Albany †	15	–	1	.938	24	–	9	.727
Stony Brook	12	–	4	.750	23	–	12	.657
Vermont	12	–	4	.750	20	–	14	.588
New Hampshire	11	–	5	.688	19	–	13	.594
Hartford	7	–	9	.438	14	–	16	.467
UMass Lowell*	6	–	10	.375	12	–	17	.414
Binghamton	5	–	11	.313	6	–	26	.188
UMBC	2	–	14	.125	4	–	26	.133
Maine	2	–	14	.125	3	–	27	.100
† 2015 America East tournament winner *ineligible for postseason play due to Div. I transition

The 2014–15 UMass Lowell River Hawks men's basketball team represented the University of Massachusetts Lowell during the 2014–15 NCAA Division I men's basketball season. They were coached by second year head coach Pat Duquette and played most of their home games at Costello Athletic Center, with two home games at the Tsongas Center. They were a member of the America East Conference. They finished the season 12–17, 6–10 in America East play to finish in sixth place.

UMass Lowell was in the second year of a transition to Division I and thus ineligible for the postseason.

== Roster ==
2014–15 UMass Lowell River Hawks men's basketball team
Players
Coaches

Pos.	#	Name	Height	Weight	Year	Hometown
G	0	Lance Crawford	5 ft 10 in (1.78 m)	175 lb (79 kg)	Fr	Davie, Florida
G	4	Chad Holley	5 ft 10 in (1.78 m)	170 lb (77 kg)	Sr	New York, New York
F	5	Dontavious Smith	6 ft 8 in (2.03 m)	180 lb (82 kg)	Fr	Springhill, Louisiana
G	10	Jahad Thomas	6 ft 2 in (1.88 m)	220 lb (100 kg)	RS Fr	Williamsport, Pennsylvania
G	13	Marco Banegas-Flores	6 ft 1 in (1.85 m)	190 lb (86 kg)	GS	Boston, Massachusetts
G	15	Jordan Shea	6 ft 4 in (1.93 m)	180 lb (82 kg)	Fr	Madison, Wisconsin
G	21	DJ Mlachnik	6 ft 2 in (1.88 m)	175 lb (79 kg)	Jr	Muskego, Wisconsin
G	22	Matt Harris	6 ft 1 in (1.85 m)	210 lb (95 kg)	Fr	Erie, Pennsylvania
G	23	Kerry Weldon	6 ft 5 in (1.96 m)	190 lb (86 kg)	RS Sr	New York, New York
F	24	Tyler Livingston	6 ft 5 in (1.96 m)	200 lb (91 kg)	So	Hudson, New Hampshire
G	30	Mark Cornelius	6 ft 2 in (1.88 m)	180 lb (82 kg)	Jr	Westford, Massachusetts
G/F	33	Josh Gantz	6 ft 6 in (1.98 m)	190 lb (86 kg)	Fr	Grove City, Ohio
G/F	34	Jordan Rhodes	6 ft 6 in (1.98 m)	177 lb (80 kg)	Fr	Fountain, Colorado
G/F	35	Brad Schaub	6 ft 6 in (1.98 m)	180 lb (82 kg)	Fr	Marlette, Michigan

Head coach

- Pat Duquette

Assistant coach(es)

- Michael Harding
- Biko Paris
- Nick Leonardelli

Legend

- (C) Team captain
- (S) Suspended
- (I) Ineligible
- (W) Walk-on
- Injured
- Current redshirt

Roster
Last update: October 13, 2014

== Schedule ==
Date time, TV	Opponent	Result	Record	Site (attendance) city, state
Regular Season
11/14/2014*; 7:00 pm, BTN+	at No. 20 Ohio State	L 55–92	0–1	Value City Arena (13,256); Columbus, OH
11/16/2014*; 2:00 pm	at Rhode Island	L 56–72	0–2	Ryan Center (4,320); Kingston, RI
11/20/2014*; 7:00 pm	at Sacred Heart	W 57–54	1–2	William H. Pitt Center (N/A); Fairfield, CT
11/22/2014*; 2:00 pm	at NJIT	W 63–61	2–2	Fleisher Center (500); Newark, NJ
11/23/2014*; 6:00 pm, SNY	at Fordham	W 64–57	3–2	Rose Hill Gymnasium (1,122); Bronx, NY
11/25/2014*; 7:00 pm	Mount Ida	W 102–57	4–2	Costello Athletic Center (671); Lowell, MA
11/30/2014*; 1:00 pm	at Boston University	W 69–59	5–2	Case Gym (407); Boston, MA
12/03/2014*; 7:00 pm	NJIT	W 71–67	6–2	Costello Athletic Center (387); Lowell, MA
12/06/2014*; 4:30 pm	at Cornell	L 60–71	6–3	Newman Arena (659); Ithaca, NY
12/10/2014*; 8:00 pm	Dartmouth	L 48–69	6–4	Costello Athletic Center (732); Lowell, MA
12/20/2014*; 1:00 pm	at Duquesne	L 63–79	6–5	Palumbo Center (1,424); Pittsburgh, PA
12/29/2014*; 2:00 pm	at Boston College	L 47–70	6–6	Conte Forum (3,711); Chestnut Hill, MA
01/02/2015; 7:00 pm	Binghamton	W 50–40	7–6 (1–0)	Costello Athletic Center (1,021); Lowell, MA
01/05/2015*; 7:00 pm	at Brown	L 49–58	7–7	Pizzitola Sports Center (337); Providence, RI
01/07/2015; 7:00 pm	at UMBC	W 73–61 ^{OT}	8–7 (2–0)	Retriever Activities Center (676); Catonsville, MD
01/10/2015; 2:00 pm	Albany	L 51–64	8–8 (2–1)	Costello Athletic Center (334); Lowell, MA
01/13/2015; 7:00 pm	at Maine	W 62–59	9–8 (3–1)	Cross Insurance Center (1,069); Bangor, ME
01/17/2015; 7:00 pm	at Hartford	L 62–68 ^{OT}	9–9 (3–2)	Chase Arena at Reich Family Pavilion (2,027); Hartford, CT
01/19/2015; 3:30 pm	at New Hampshire	L 64–67 ^{OT}	9–10 (3–3)	Lundholm Gym (856); Durham, NH
01/22/2015; 5:30 pm	Stony Brook	L 45–65	9–11 (3–4)	Costello Athletic Center (341); Lowell, MA
01/25/2015; 2:00 pm	Vermont	L 50–61	9–12 (3–5)	Tsongas Center (3,971); Lowell, MA
01/31/2015; 2:00 pm	at Binghamton	L 69–76	9–13 (3–6)	Binghamton University Events Center (2,075); Vestal, NY
02/05/2015; 7:00 pm	UMBC	W 67–51	10–13 (4–6)	Costello Athletic Center (308); Lowell, MA
02/07/2015; 7:30 pm	at Albany	L 59–69	10–14 (4–7)	SEFCU Arena (4,468); Albany, NY
02/11/2015; 7:00 pm	at Vermont	L 53–96	10–15 (4–8)	Patrick Gym (1,884); Burlington, VT
02/14/2015; 2:00 pm	Hartford	W 69–63	11–15 (5–8)	Costello Athletic Center (131); Lowell, MA
02/18/2015; 7:00 pm	Maine	W 82–71	12–15 (6–8)	Costello Athletic Center (418); Lowell, MA
02/21/2015; 4:30 pm	New Hampshire	L 60–76	12–16 (6–9)	Tsongas Center (1,950); Lowell, MA
02/25/2015; 7:00 pm	at Stony Brook	L 60–75	12–17 (6–10)	Island Federal Credit Union Arena (2,581); Stony Brook, NY
*Non-conference game. ^{#}Rankings from AP Poll. (#) Tournament seedings in parentheses. All times are in Eastern Time..
