= 2014–15 Miami Hurricanes men's basketball team =

American college basketball season

2014–15 Miami Hurricanes men's basketball

Charleston Classic champions

NIT, Runners Up
- Conference: Atlantic Coast Conference
- Record: 25–13 (10–8 ACC)
- Head coach: Jim Larrañaga (4th season)
- Assistant coaches: Eric Konkol; Michael Huger; Chris Caputo
- Home arena: BankUnited Center

2014–15 ACC men's basketball standings
	Conf.				Overall
Team	W		L	PCT	W		L	PCT
No. 6 Virginia	16	–	2	.889	30	–	4	.882
No. 4 Duke	15	–	3	.833	35	–	4	.897
No. 8 Notre Dame †	14	–	4	.778	32	–	6	.842
No. 15 North Carolina	11	–	7	.611	26	–	12	.684
Miami (FL)	10	–	8	.556	25	–	13	.658
NC State	10	–	8	.556	22	–	14	.611
Syracuse	9	–	9	.500	18	–	13	.581
Clemson	8	–	10	.444	16	–	15	.516
Florida State	8	–	10	.444	17	–	16	.515
Pittsburgh	8	–	10	.444	19	–	15	.559
Wake Forest	5	–	13	.278	13	–	19	.406
Boston College	4	–	14	.222	13	–	19	.406
Georgia Tech	3	–	15	.167	12	–	19	.387
Virginia Tech	2	–	16	.111	11	–	22	.333
No. 17 Louisville*	0	–	6	.000	0	–	8	.000
† ACC tournament winner Rankings from AP poll *Louisville: 24 reg. season games, 4 postseason games vacated due to sanctions against the program; Disputed Record-(27-9)(12-6)

The 2014–15 Miami Hurricanes men's basketball team represented the University of Miami during the 2014–15 NCAA Division I men's basketball season. The Hurricanes, led by fourth-year head coach Jim Larrañaga, played their home games at the BankUnited Center and were members of the Atlantic Coast Conference. The team had wins at Duke, Syracuse and Florida, all on the road. They finished the season 25–13, 10–8 in ACC play to finish in a tie for sixth place. They advanced to the quarterfinals of the ACC tournament, where they lost to Notre Dame. They were invited to the National Invitation Tournament, where they defeated North Carolina Central, Alabama, Richmond and Temple to advance to the NIT championship game, where they lost to Stanford.

As of 2024, this was the last season the Hurricanes made the NIT.

== Previous season ==
The Hurricanes finished the season 17–16, 7–11 in ACC play to finish in tenth place. They advanced to the second round of the ACC tournament, where they lost to NC State. They were not invited to either the NCAA tournament or NIT.

=== Departures ===
Departures
Name	Number	Pos.	Height	Weight	Year	Hometown	Reason for departure
Raphael Akpejiori	4	F	6'9"	241	RS senior	Lagos, Nigeria	Graduated
Rion Brown	15	G	6'6"	211	Senior	Hinesville, GA	Graduated
Erik Swoope	21	F	6'5	220	Senior	Lake Elsinore, CA	Graduated
Donnavan Kirk	22	F	6'9"	228	RS senior	Pontiac, MI	Graduated
Garrius Adams	25	G	6'6"	200	Senior	Apex, NC	Graduated
James Kelly	35	F	6'7"	246	Junior	Ann Arbor, MI	Transferred to Marshall

=== Incoming transfers ===
Incoming transfers
Name	Number	Pos.	Height	Weight	Year	Hometown	Previous school
Joe Thomas	2	F	6'7"	220	Graduate	Miami, FL	Niagara
Kamari Murphy	21	F/C	6'8"	220	Junior	Brooklyn, NY	Oklahoma State
Ivan Uceda	33	C	6'10"	240	Junior	Madrid, Spain	Harcum College

== 2014 recruiting class ==
College recruiting
Name	Hometown	School	Height	Weight	Commit date
Ja'Quan Newton; G	Philadelphia, PA	Neumann-Goretti High School	6 ft 2 in (1.88 m)	180 lb (82 kg)	Aug 7, 2013
Ja'Quan Newton; G	Recruit ratings: Scout: Rivals: 247Sports: ESPN:				
James Palmer Jr. G	Washington, D.C.	Saint John's College High School	6 ft 4 in (1.93 m)	170 lb (77 kg)	Aug 5, 2013
James Palmer Jr. G	Recruit ratings: Scout: Rivals: 247Sports: ESPN:				
Omar Sherman; C	Duncanville, TX	Duncanville High School	6 ft 9 in (2.06 m)	250 lb (110 kg)	Nov 3, 2013
Omar Sherman; C	Recruit ratings: Scout: Rivals: 247Sports: ESPN:				
Overall recruit ranking:
Note: In many cases, Scout, Rivals, 247Sports, On3, and ESPN may conflict in their listings of height and weight.; In these cases, the average was taken. ESPN grades are on a 100-point scale.; Sources: "2014 Team Ranking". Rivals.

== Roster ==
2014–15 Miami Hurricanes men's basketball team
Players
Coaches

Pos.	#	Name	Height	Weight	Year	Hometown
G	0	Ja'Quan Newton	6 ft 2 in (1.88 m)	180 lb (82 kg)	Fr	Philadelphia, PA
G	1	Deandre Burnett	6 ft 2 in (1.88 m)	191 lb (87 kg)	RS Fr	Miami, FL
F	2	Joe Thomas	6 ft 7 in (2.01 m)	235 lb (107 kg)	GS	Miami, FL
G	5	Davon Reed	6 ft 6 in (1.98 m)	208 lb (94 kg)	So	Ewing, NJ
G	10	Sheldon McClellan	6 ft 5 in (1.96 m)	206 lb (93 kg)	RS Jr	Houston, TX
G	11	Mike Fernandez (W)	6 ft 1 in (1.85 m)	189 lb (86 kg)	So	Coral Gables, FL
G	12	James Palmer Jr.	6 ft 4 in (1.93 m)	180 lb (82 kg)	Fr	Washington, D.C.
G	13	Angel Rodríguez	5 ft 11 in (1.8 m)	181 lb (82 kg)	RS Jr	Cupey, Puerto Rico
G	20	Manu Lecomte	5 ft 9 in (1.75 m)	159 lb (72 kg)	So	Brussels, Belgium
F	21	Kamari Murphy (I) (redshirt)	6 ft 9 in (2.06 m)	220 lb (100 kg)	Jr	Brooklyn, NY
F	22	Omar Sherman	6 ft 8 in (2.03 m)	220 lb (100 kg)	Fr	Duncanville, TX
C	23	Tonye Jekiri	7 ft 0 in (2.13 m)	235 lb (107 kg)	Jr	Hialeah, FL
F	33	Ivan Uceda	6 ft 10 in (2.08 m)	240 lb (109 kg)	Jr	Madrid, Spain
F	35	Chris Stowell (W)	6 ft 7 in (2.01 m)	190 lb (86 kg)	Fr	Exeter, NH

Head coach

- Jim Larrañaga (Providence)

Assistant coach(es)

- Eric Konkol (Wisconsin–Eau Claire)
- Michael Huger (Bowling Green)
- Chris Caputo (Westfield State)

Legend

- (C) Team captain
- (S) Suspended
- (I) Ineligible
- (W) Walk-on
- Injured
- Current redshirt

== Schedule and results ==
Date time, TV	Rank^{#}	Opponent^{#}	Result	Record	High points	High rebounds	High assists	Site (attendance) city, state
Exhibition
Nov 6, 2014*; 7:00 pm		Eckerd	W 74–58		24 – McClellan	8 – Tied	6 – Rodriguez	BankUnited Center; Coral Gables, FL
Non-conference regular season
Nov 14, 2014*; 7:00 pm		Howard	W 84–49	1–0	19 – McClellan	11 – Jekiri	3 – Tied	BankUnited Center (4,544); Coral Gables, FL
Nov 17, 2014*; 7:00 pm, ESPNU		at No. 8 Florida	W 69–67	2–0	24 – Rodriguez	8 – Jekiri	5 – McClellan	O'Connell Center (11,156); Gainesville, FL
Nov 20, 2014*; 3:00 pm, ESPNU		vs. Drexel; Charleston Classic First Round	W 66–46	3–0	15 – Tied	13 – Jekiri	4 – Tied	TD Arena (1,131); Charleston, SC
Nov 21, 2014*; 2:30 pm, ESPNU		vs. Akron; Charleston Classic Semifinals	W 79–51	4–0	17 – McClellan	16 – Jekiri	9 – Rodriguez	TD Arena (855); Charleston, SC
Nov 23, 2014*; 9:10 pm, ESPN2		vs. Charlotte; Charleston Classic Championship	W 77–58	5–0	19 – McClellan	9 – McClellan	5 – Rodriguez	TD Arena (1,532); Charleston, SC
Nov 25, 2014*; 9:00 pm, FSN	No. 17	at Charlotte	W 77–74	6–0	31 – McClellan	13 – Jekiri	6 – Rodriguez	Dale F. Halton Arena (7,163); Charlotte, NC
Nov 28, 2014*; 7:00 pm, ESPN3	No. 17	South Alabama	W 87–75	7–0	17 – McClellan	8 – Jekiri	8 – Jekiri	BankUnited Center (4,267); Coral Gables, FL
Dec 2, 2014*; 9:00 pm, ESPN2	No. 15	No. 24 Illinois; ACC–Big Ten Challenge	W 70–61	8–0	19 – Burnett	9 – Tied	5 – Rodriguez	BankUnited Center (6,086); Coral Gables, FL
Dec 6, 2014*; 2:00 pm, ESPN3	No. 15	Green Bay	L 55–68	8–1	20 – Burnett	13 – Thomas	3 – Rodriguez	BankUnited Center (4,735); Coral Gables, FL
Dec 8, 2014*; 7:00 pm, ESPN3	No. 20	Savannah State	W 70–39	9–1	17 – Rodriquez	9 – Jekiri	4 – Rodriquez	BankUnited Center (4,274); Coral Gables, FL
Dec 19, 2014*; 7:00 pm, ESPN3	No. 18	Eastern Kentucky	L 44–72	9–2	9 – Burnett	12 – Jekiri	3 – Tied	BankUnited Center (4,467); Coral Gables, FL
Dec 22, 2014*; 9:00 pm, FS1		vs. Providence; Brooklyn Hoops Holiday Invitational	L 62–76	9–3	19 – Rodriguez	10 – Jekiri	4 – Rodriguez	Barclays Center (6,519); Brooklyn, NY
Dec 30, 2014*; 7:00 pm		College of Charleston	W 67–40	10–3	15 – Rodriguez	8 – Jekiri	4 – Tied	BankUnited Center (4,705); Coral Gables, FL
ACC regular season
Jan 3, 2015; 5:30 pm, ESPN2		No. 3 Virginia	L 80–89 ^{2OT}	10–4 (0–1)	25 – Rodriguez	12 – Jekiri	7 – Rodriguez	BankUnited Center (5,377); Coral Gables, FL
Jan 10, 2015; 4:00 pm, RSN		Boston College	W 60–56	11–4 (1–1)	17 – Rodriquez	15 – Jekiri	8 – Rodriquez	BankUnited Center (6,608); Coral Gables, FL
Jan 13, 2015; 9:00 pm, ESPNU		at No. 4 Duke	W 90–74	12–4 (2–1)	24 – Rodriguez	10 – Jekiri	5 – Rodriguez	Cameron Indoor Stadium (9,314); Durham, NC
Jan 17, 2015; 2:00 pm, ESPN2		at No. 12 Notre Dame	L 70–75	12–5 (2–2)	17 – McClellan	13 – Jekiri	5 – Newton	Joyce Center (9,149); Notre Dame, IN
Jan 22, 2015; 8:00 pm, ACCN		NC State	W 65–60	13–5 (3–2)	16 – McLellan	10 – Tied	6 – Rodriguez	BankUnited Center (6,556); Coral Gables, FL
Jan 24, 2015; 4:00 pm, ESPN2		at Syracuse	W 66–62	14–5 (4–2)	13 – Jekiri	15 – Jekiri	8 – Rodriquez	Carrier Dome (30,677); Syracuse, NY
Jan 28, 2015; 9:00 pm, RSN	No. 23	Georgia Tech	L 50–70	14–6 (4–3)	13 – Jekiri	9 – Jekiri	5 – Rodriquez	BankUnited Center (5,031); Coral Gables, FL
Feb 1, 2015; 12:30 pm, ESPNU	No. 23	at Florida State	L 54–55	14–7 (4–4)	13 – McClellan	6 – Reed	4 – Lecomte	Donald L. Tucker Civic Center (7,282); Tallahassee, FL
Feb 3, 2015; 8:00 pm, ACCN		No. 9 Louisville	L 55–63	14–8 (4–5)	19 – Reed	10 – Jekiri	3 – Lecomte	BankUnited Center (6,563); Coral Gables, FL
Feb 8, 2015; 6:30 pm, ESPNU		Clemson	W 56–45	15–8 (5–5)	19 – McClellan	16 – Jekiri	5 – Rodriquez	BankUnited Center (6,351); Coral Gables, FL
Feb 11, 2015; 7:00 pm, RSN		at Wake Forest	L 70–72	15–9 (5–6)	17 – Reed	8 – McClellan	5 – McClellan	LJVM Coliseum (9,918); Winston-Salem, NC
Feb 16, 2015; 3:00 pm, ESPNU		at Boston College	W 89–86 ^{2OT}	16–9 (6–6)	24 – McClellan	15 – Jekiri	6 – Rodriquez	Conte Forum (3,813); Chestnut Hill, MA
Feb 18, 2015; 7:00 pm, RSN		Virginia Tech	W 76–52	17–9 (7–6)	21 – McClellan	15 – Jekiri	5 – Reed	BankUnited Center (5,007); Coral Gables, FL
Feb 21, 2015; 2:00 pm, ESPN		at No. 12 Louisville	L 53–55	17–10 (7–7)	17 – McClellan	15 – Jekiri	4 – Rodriguez	KFC Yum! Center (21,345); Louisville, KY
Feb 25, 2015; 9:00 pm, RSN		Florida State	W 81–77	18–10 (8–7)	25 – Rodriquez	11 – Jekiri	5 – Rodriquez	BankUnited Center (5,857); Coral Gables, FL
Feb 28, 2015; 2:00 pm, CBS		No. 15 North Carolina	L 64–73	18–11 (8–8)	11 – McClellan	7 – Jekiri	4 – Lecomte	BankUnited Center (7,972); Coral Gables, FL
Mar 4, 2015; 8:00 pm, RSN		at Pittsburgh	W 67–63	19–11 (9–8)	20 – McClellan	11 – Jekiri	4 – McClellan	Peterson Events Center (10,549); Pittsburgh, PA
Mar 7, 2015; 12:00 pm, RSN		at Virginia Tech	W 82–61	20–11 (10–8)	20 – Lecomte	5 – Tied	5 – McClellan	Cassell Coliseum (5,421); Blacksburg, VA
ACC tournament
Mar 11, 2015; 9:30 pm, ESPN2	(6)	vs. (14) Virginia Tech; Second Round	W 59–49	21–11	16 – McClellan	7 – Jekiri	5 – Lecomte	Greensboro Coliseum (22,026); Greensboro, NC
Mar 12, 2015; 9:30 pm, ESPN	(6)	vs. (3) No. 11 Notre Dame; Quarterfinals	L 63–70	21–12	15 – Rodriguez	11 – Jekiri	1 – Tied	Greensboro Coliseum (22,026); Greensboro, NC
National Invitation Tournament
Mar 17, 2015*; 7:00 pm, ESPN2	(2)	(7) North Carolina Central; First Round	W 75–71	22–12	18 – Lecomte	6 – Jekiri	6 – Reed	BankUnited Center (1,612); Coral Gables, FL
Mar 21, 2015*; 11:00 am, ESPN	(2)	(6) Alabama; Second Round	W 73–66	23–12	17 – Lecomte	12 – Jekiri	4 – McClellan	BankUnited Center (1,979); Coral Gables, FL
Mar 24, 2015*; 7:00 pm, ESPN	(2)	at (1) Richmond; Quarterfinals	W 63–61	24–12	16 – McClellen	12 – Reed	2 – Tied	Robins Center (6,126); Richmond, VA
Mar 31, 2015*; 7:00 pm, ESPN	(2)	vs. (1) Temple; Semifinals	W 60–57	25–12	16 – McClellan	11 – McClellan	4 – Reed	Madison Square Garden (7,185); New York, NY
Apr 2, 2015*; 9:00 pm, ESPN	(2)	vs. (2) Stanford; Championship	L 64–66 ^{OT}	25–13	17 – McClellan	5 – Tied	4 – Reed	Madison Square Garden (6,600); New York, NY
*Non-conference game. ^{#}Rankings from AP Poll. (#) Tournament seedings in parentheses. All times are in Eastern Time. (#) during NIT is seed within region.

== Rankings ==
Ranking movement Legend: ██ Increase in ranking. ██ Decrease in ranking. (RV) Received votes but unranked. (NR) Not ranked.
Poll	Pre	Wk 2	Wk 3	Wk 4	Wk 5	Wk 6	Wk 7	Wk 8	Wk 9	Wk 10	Wk 11	Wk 12	Wk 13	Wk 14	Wk 15	Wk 16	Wk 17	Wk 18	Wk 19	Final
AP	NR	NR	17	15	20	18	RV	NR	NR	NR	RV	23	NR	NR	NR	NR	NR	NR	NR	N/A
Coaches	RV	RV	20	15	21т	19	RV	NR	NR	NR	RV	23	NR	NR	NR	NR	NR	NR	NR	NR
