= 2014–15 Binghamton Bearcats men's basketball team =

American college basketball season

2014–15 Binghamton Bearcats men's basketball
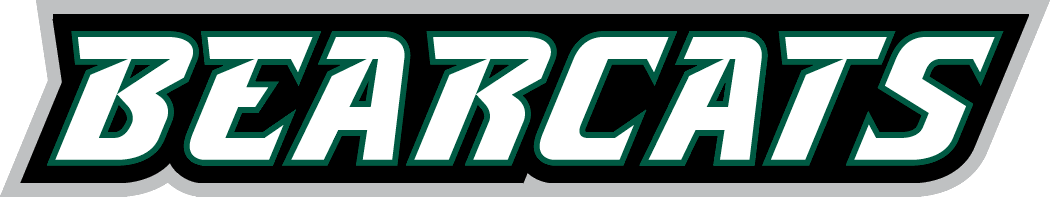
- Conference: America East Conference
- Record: 6–26 (5–11 America East)
- Head coach: Tommy Dempsey (3rd season)
- Assistant coaches: Ben Luber; Lazarus Sims; Bryan Goodman
- Home arena: Binghamton University Events Center

2014–15 America East Conference men's basketball standings
	Conf.				Overall
Team	W		L	PCT	W		L	PCT
Albany †	15	–	1	.938	24	–	9	.727
Stony Brook	12	–	4	.750	23	–	12	.657
Vermont	12	–	4	.750	20	–	14	.588
New Hampshire	11	–	5	.688	19	–	13	.594
Hartford	7	–	9	.438	14	–	16	.467
UMass Lowell*	6	–	10	.375	12	–	17	.414
Binghamton	5	–	11	.313	6	–	26	.188
UMBC	2	–	14	.125	4	–	26	.133
Maine	2	–	14	.125	3	–	27	.100
† 2015 America East tournament winner *ineligible for postseason play due to Div. I transition

The 2014–15 Binghamton Bearcats men's basketball team represented Binghamton University during the 2014–15 NCAA Division I men's basketball season. The Bearcats, led by third year head coach Tommy Dempsey, played their home games at the Binghamton University Events Center and were members of the America East Conference. They finished the season 6–26, 5–11 in America East play to finis in seventh place. The lost in the quarterfinals of the America East tournament to Stony Brook.

== Roster ==
Number	Name	Position	Height	Weight	Year	Hometown
0	Karon Waller	Guard	6–4	200	Junior	Camden, New Jersey
1	Marlon Beck II	Guard	5–11	175	Sophomore	Bowie, Maryland
3	Jordan Reed	Guard	6–4	205	Junior	Philadelphia, Pennsylvania
5	Magnus Richards	Forward	6–7	210	Sophomore	Silver Spring, Maryland
10	Yosef Yacob	Guard	6–0	170	Sophomore	Chester, Pennsylvania
11	Romello Walker	Guard	6–6	190	Freshman	Fort Lauderdale, Florida
12	John Rinaldi	Guard	6–1	190	Sophomore	Dunmore, Pennsylvania
14	Jordan McRae	Forward	6–6	190	Freshman	Dix Hills, New York
15	Bobby Ahearn	Forward	6–6	225	Freshman	Marshfield, Massachusetts
21	Nick Madray	Forward	6–9	215	Sophomore	Mississauga, Ontario
25	Justin McFadden	Guard/Forward	6–5	200	Freshman	Philadelphia, Pennsylvania
30	John Schurman	Guard/Forward	6–6	200	Freshman	Syracuse, New York
32	Jabrille Williams	Forward	6–6	190	Senior	Stamford, Connecticut
41	Dusan Perovic	Forward/Center	6–9	230	Freshman	Podgorica, Montenegro
42	Willie Rodriguez	Forward	6–6	220	Freshman	Orlando, Florida

== Schedule ==
Date time, TV	Opponent	Result	Record	Site (attendance) city, state
Exhibition
11/01/2014*; 2:00 pm	Mansfield	W 66–60		Binghamton University Events Center (1,522); Vestal, NY
11/07/2014*; 8:00 pm	Oswego State	W 75–74		Binghamton University Events Center (2,252); Vestal, NY
Regular season
11/14/2014*; 9:00 pm	at Notre Dame; Hall of Fame Tip Off	L 39–82	0–1	Edmund P. Joyce Center (7,360); South Bend, IN
11/17/2014*; 9:00 pm, FS1	at Providence; Hall of Fame Tip Off	L 45–66	0–2	Dunkin' Donuts Center (4,033); Providence, RI
11/19/2014*; 7:00 pm	Hartwick	W 82–51	1–2	Binghamton University Events Center (1,846); Vestal, NY
11/22/2014*; 5:30 pm	vs. Manhattan; Hall of Fame Tip Off	L 63–78	1–3	Mohegan Sun Arena (1,121); Uncasville, CT
11/23/2014*; 5:30 pm	vs. Navy; Hall of Fame Tip Off	L 68–70	1–4	Mohegan Sun Arena (717); Uncasville, CT
11/25/2014*; 7:30 pm	at Army	L 54–80	1–5	Christl Arena (835); West Point, NY
11/29/2014*; 2:00 pm	Cornell	L 54–68	1–6	Binghamton University Events Center (1,950); Vestal, NY
12/03/2014*; 7:30 pm	at Boston University	L 65–77	1–7	Case Gym (723); Boston, MA
12/06/2014*; 2:00 pm	Penn	L 70–79	1–8	Binghamton University Events Center (3,731); Vestal, NY
12/08/2014*; 7:00 pm	Caldwell	L 52–63	1–9	Binghamton University Events Center (1,621); Vestal, NY
12/11/2014*; 7:00 pm	at Colgate	L 44–65	1–10	Cotterell Court (473); Hamilton, NY
12/14/2014*; 1:00 pm, ESPN3	at Boston College	L 49–63	1–11	Conte Forum (1,876); Chestnut Hill, MA
12/20/2014*; 2:00 pm	St. Bonaventure	L 51–69	1–12	Binghamton University Events Center (3,213); Vestal, NY
12/22/2014*; 7:00 pm	at Mount St. Mary's	L 68–69	1–13	Knott Arena (1,460); Emmitsburg, MD
12/30/2014*; 7:00 pm	Buffalo	L 50–76	1–14	Binghamton University Events Center (3,534); Vestal, NY
01/02/2015; 7:00 pm	at UMass Lowell	L 40–50	1–15 (0–1)	Costello Athletic Center (1,021); Lowell, MA
01/07/2015; 7:00 pm	at Hartford	L 59–69	1–16 (0–2)	Chase Arena at Reich Family Pavilion (1,009); Hartford, CT
01/10/2015; 2:15 pm	Maine	W 65–46	2–16 (1–2)	Binghamton University Events Center (2,547); Vestal, NY
01/14/2015; 7:00 pm	at Albany	L 58–73	2–17 (1–3)	SEFCU Arena (2,617); Albany, NY
01/14/2015; 2:00 pm	New Hampshire	L 66–73 ^{OT}	2–18 (1–4)	Binghamton University Events Center (1,761); Vestal, NY
01/19/2015; 7:00 pm	at Vermont	L 44–64	2–19 (1–5)	Patrick Gym (2,071); Burlington, VT
01/25/2015; 2:00 pm	Stony Brook	L 54–61	2–20 (1–6)	Binghamton University Events Center (2,247); Vestal, NY
01/28/2015; 7:00 pm	at UMBC	W 68–56	3–20 (2–6)	Retriever Activities Center (748); Catonsville, MD
01/31/2015; 2:00 pm	UMass Lowell	W 76–69	4–20 (3–6)	Binghamton University Events Center (2,075); Vestal, NY
02/03/2015; 2:00 pm, ESPN3	Hartford	L 61–62	4–21 (3–7)	Binghamton University Events Center (4,445); Vestal, NY
02/07/2015; 1:00 pm	at Maine	L 64–67	4–22 (3–8)	Cross Insurance Center (1,158); Bangor, ME
02/10/2015; 7:00 pm	Albany	L 46–62	4–23 (3–9)	Binghamton University Events Center (2,190); Vestal, NY
02/14/2015; 1:00 pm	at New Hampshire	L 48–66	4–24 (3–10)	Lundholm Gym (1,071); Durham, NH
02/18/2015; 7:00 pm	at Vermont	W 57–55	5–24 (4–10)	Binghamton University Events Center (1,856); Vestal, NY
02/21/2015; 2:00 pm, ESPN3	at Stony Brook	L 52–64	5–25 (4–11)	Island Federal Credit Union Arena (3,724); Stony Brook, NY
02/28/2015; 2:00 pm	UMBC	W 76–69	6–25 (5–11)	Binghamton University Events Center (2,838); Vestal, NY
America East tournament
03/04/2015; 7:00 pm, ESPN3	at Stony Brook; Quarterfinals	L 57–62	6–26	Island Federal Credit Union Arena (3,289); Stony Brook, NY
*Non-conference game. ^{#}Rankings from AP Poll. (#) Tournament seedings in parentheses. All times are in Eastern Time.
