= 2014–15 Boston College Eagles men's basketball team =

American college basketball season

2014–15 Boston College Eagles men's basketball
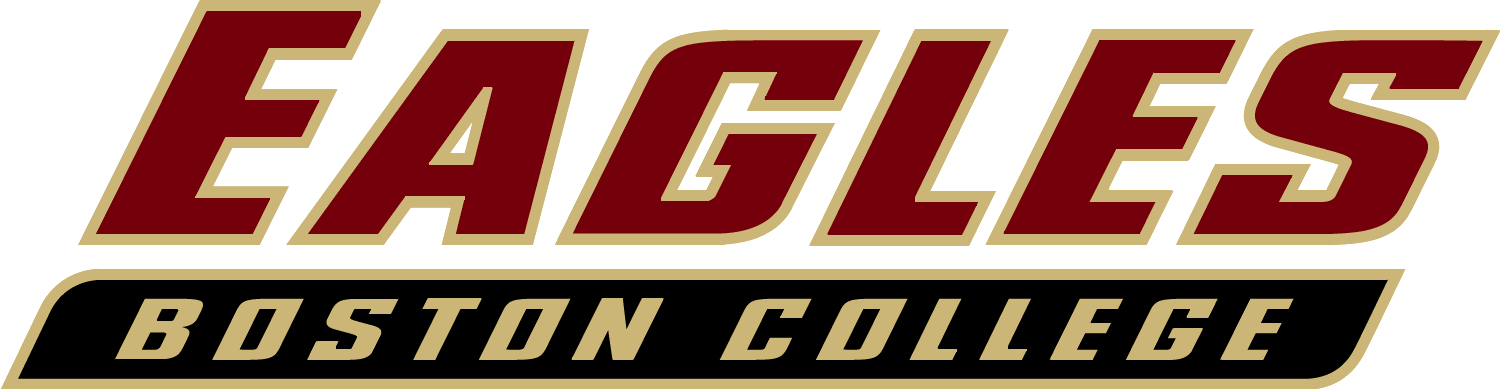
- Conference: Atlantic Coast Conference
- Record: 13–19 (4–14 ACC)
- Head coach: Jim Christian (1st season)
- Assistant coaches: Scott Spinelli; Bill Wuczynski; Preston Murphy
- Home arena: Conte Forum

2014–15 ACC men's basketball standings
	Conf.				Overall
Team	W		L	PCT	W		L	PCT
No. 6 Virginia	16	–	2	.889	30	–	4	.882
No. 4 Duke	15	–	3	.833	35	–	4	.897
No. 8 Notre Dame †	14	–	4	.778	32	–	6	.842
No. 15 North Carolina	11	–	7	.611	26	–	12	.684
Miami (FL)	10	–	8	.556	25	–	13	.658
NC State	10	–	8	.556	22	–	14	.611
Syracuse	9	–	9	.500	18	–	13	.581
Clemson	8	–	10	.444	16	–	15	.516
Florida State	8	–	10	.444	17	–	16	.515
Pittsburgh	8	–	10	.444	19	–	15	.559
Wake Forest	5	–	13	.278	13	–	19	.406
Boston College	4	–	14	.222	13	–	19	.406
Georgia Tech	3	–	15	.167	12	–	19	.387
Virginia Tech	2	–	16	.111	11	–	22	.333
No. 17 Louisville*	0	–	6	.000	0	–	8	.000
† ACC tournament winner Rankings from AP poll *Louisville: 24 reg. season games, 4 postseason games vacated due to sanctions against the program; Disputed Record-(27-9)(12-6)

The 2014–15 Boston College Eagles men's basketball team represented Boston College during the 2014–15 NCAA Division I men's basketball season. The Eagles, led by first year head coach Jim Christian, played their home games at Conte Forum and were members of the Atlantic Coast Conference. They finished the season 13–19, 4–14 in ACC play to finish in 13th place. They advanced to the second round of the ACC tournament where they lost to North Carolina.

== Last season ==
The Eagles finished the season 8–24, 4–14 in ACC play to finish in 14th place. They lost in the first round of the ACC tournament to Georgia Tech.

== Departures ==
Name	Number	Pos.	Height	Weight	Year	Hometown	Notes
Ryan Anderson	12	F	6'9"	216	Junior	Lakewood, CA	Transferred to Arizona
Joe Rahon	25	G	6'2"	195	Sophomore	San Diego, CA	Transferred to Saint Mary's
Danny Rubin	31	G	6'6"	198	Senior	Chevy Chase, MD	Graduated

=== Incoming transfers ===
Name	Number	Pos.	Height	Weight	Year	Hometown	Previous School
Dumitiri Batten	1	G	6'3"	205	RS Senior	Newport News, VA	Transferred from Old Dominion. Will be eligible to play immediately since Batten graduated from Old Dominion.
Aaron Brown	22	F	6'5"	210	RS Senior	Hackensack, NJ	Transferred from Southern Miss. Will be eligible to play immediately since Brown graduated from Southern Miss.

== Recruiting ==
College recruiting information
Name	Hometown	School	Height	Weight	Commit date
Idrissa Diallo; C	Los Angeles, CA	Cathedral High School	6 ft 9 in (2.06 m)	220 lb (100 kg)	May 10, 2014
Idrissa Diallo; C	Recruit ratings: Scout: Rivals: 247Sports: ESPN:				
Overall recruit ranking:
Note: In many cases, Scout, Rivals, 247Sports, On3, and ESPN may conflict in their listings of height and weight.; In these cases, the average was taken. ESPN grades are on a 100-point scale.; Sources: "2014 Team Ranking". Rivals.

== Roster ==
2014–15 Boston College Eagles men's basketball team
Players
Coaches

Pos.	#	Name	Height	Weight	Year	Hometown
F	0	Garland Owens	6 ft 5 in (1.96 m)	210 lb (95 kg)	So	Gaithersburg, MD
G	1	Dimitri Batten	6 ft 3 in (1.91 m)	205 lb (93 kg)	RS Sr	Newport News, VA
G	2	Darryl Hicks	6 ft 2 in (1.88 m)	185 lb (84 kg)	RS Fr	Louisville, KY
F	4	Eddie Odio	6 ft 8 in (2.03 m)	210 lb (95 kg)	Sr	Miami, FL
C	5	KC Caudill	6 ft 11 in (2.11 m)	300 lb (136 kg)	Sr	Brea, CA
G	10	Steve Perpiglia	5 ft 10 in (1.78 m)	165 lb (75 kg)	Jr	Broomall, PA
F	11	Will Magarity	6 ft 11 in (2.11 m)	240 lb (109 kg)	So	Stockholm, Sweden
F	12	Idy Diallo	6 ft 11 in (2.11 m)	240 lb (109 kg)	Fr	Los Angeles, CA
F	13	John Cain Carney	6 ft 9 in (2.06 m)	225 lb (102 kg)	Sr	Philadelphia, PA
G	15	Sam Donahue	6 ft 1 in (1.85 m)	180 lb (82 kg)	So	Pawcatuck, CT
G	20	Lonnie Jackson	6 ft 4 in (1.93 m)	175 lb (79 kg)	Sr	Valencia, CA
G	21	Olivier Hanlan	6 ft 4 in (1.93 m)	190 lb (86 kg)	Jr	Aylmer, QE
G	22	Aaron Brown	6 ft 5 in (1.96 m)	215 lb (98 kg)	RS Sr	Hackensack, NJ
G	23	Alex Dragicevich	6 ft 8 in (2.03 m)	222 lb (101 kg)	Sr	Northbrook, IL
C	24	Dennis Clifford	7 ft 1 in (2.16 m)	250 lb (113 kg)	RS Jr	Bridgewater, MA
G	33	Patrick Heckmann	6 ft 6 in (1.98 m)	210 lb (95 kg)	Sr	Mainz, Germany

Head coach

- Jim Christian (Rhode Island)

Assistant coach(es)

- Scott Spinelli (Boston University)
- Bill Wuczynski (UNLV)
- Preston Murphy (Rhode Island)

Legend

- (C) Team captain
- (S) Suspended
- (I) Ineligible
- (W) Walk-on
- Injured
- Current redshirt

Roster

== Schedule and results ==
Date time, TV	Opponent	Result	Record	Site (attendance) city, state
Exhibition
11/06/2014*; 7:00 pm	American International	W 92–53		Conte Forum; Chestnut Hill, MA
Regular season
11/14/2014*; 7:00 pm, ESPN3	New Hampshire	W 58–50	1–0	Conte Forum (3,174); Chestnut Hill, MA
11/16/2014*; 3:00 pm, NESN	vs. Massachusetts; Commonwealth Classic/Coaches vs. Cancer Tip-Off	L 62–71	1–1	TD Garden (N/A); Boston, MA
11/20/2014*; 5:00 pm, ESPN2	vs. New Mexico; Puerto Rico Tip-Off Quarterfinals	W 69–65	2–1	Roberto Clemente Coliseum (6,723); San Juan, PR
11/21/2014*; 5:00 pm, ESPN2	vs. West Virginia; Puerto Rico Tip-Off Semifinals	L 66–70	2–2	Roberto Clemente Coliseum (7,438); San Juan, PR
11/23/2014*; 4:30 pm, ESPN2	vs. Dayton; Puerto Rico Tip-Off 3rd Place Game	L 53–66	2–3	Roberto Clemente Coliseum (8,002); San Juan, PR
12/01/2014*; 7:00 pm, ESPN3	Marist	W 79–61	3–3	Conte Forum (1,748); Chestnut Hill, MA
12/05/2014*; 7:00 pm, ESPN3	Providence	W 69–60	4–3	Conte Forum (6,155); Chestnut Hill, MA
12/11/2014*; 7:00 pm, ESPN3	Maine	W 85–74	5–3	Conte Forum (2,133); Chestnut Hill, MA
12/14/2014*; 1:00 pm, ESPN3	Binghamton	W 63–49	6–3	Conte Forum (1,876); Chestnut Hill, MA
12/21/2014*; 4:00 pm, ESPNU	USC	L 71–75	6–4	Conte Forum (3,577); Chestnut Hill, MA
12/29/2014*; 2:00 pm, ESPN3	UMass Lowell	W 70–47	7–4	Conte Forum (3,711); Chestnut Hill, MA
01/03/2015; 4:00 pm, RSN	at No. 2 Duke	L 62–85	7–5 (0–1)	Cameron Indoor Stadium (9,314); Durham, NC
01/06/2015; 9:00 pm, RSN	Pittsburgh	L 60–61 ^{OT}	7–6 (0–2)	Conte Forum (2,213); Chestnut Hill, MA
01/10/2015; 4:00 pm, RSN	at Miami (FL)	L 56–60	7–7 (0–3)	BankUnited Center (6,608); Coral Gables, FL
01/14/2015*; 7:00 pm, ESPN3	Harvard; Rivalry	W 64–57 ^{OT}	8–7	Conte Forum (3,529); Chestnut Hill, MA
01/17/2015; 2:00 pm, RSN	No. 2 Virginia	L 51–66	8–8 (0–4)	Conte Forum (8,112); Chestnut Hill, MA
01/20/2015; 7:00 pm, ESPNU	at Syracuse	L 61–69	8–9 (0–5)	Carrier Dome (23,781); Syracuse, NY
01/25/2015; 1:00 pm, RSN	at Georgia Tech	W 64–62	9–9 (1–5)	Hank McCamish Pavilion (5,587); Atlanta, GA
01/28/2015; 9:00 pm, ACCN	No. 10 Louisville	L 72–81	9–10 (1–6)	Conte Forum (5,119); Chestnut Hill, MA
01/31/2015; 12:00 pm, RSN	at Clemson	L 49–64	9–11 (1–7)	Littlejohn Coliseum (8,345); Clemson, SC
02/04/2015; 7:00 pm, RSN	at No. 10 Notre Dame	L 63–71	9–12 (1–8)	Edmund P. Joyce Center (8,458); South Bend, IN
02/07/2015; 3:00 pm, ACCN	No. 12 North Carolina	L 68–79	9–13 (1–9)	Conte Forum (8,263); Chestnut Hill, MA
02/11/2015; 7:00 pm, ESPN2	Syracuse	L 56–70	9–14 (1–10)	Conte Forum (5,476); Chestnut Hill, MA
02/16/2015; 3:00 pm, ESPNU	Miami (FL)	L 86–89 ^{2OT}	9–15 (1–11)	Conte Forum (3,813); Chestnut Hill, MA
02/18/2015; 9:00 pm, ACCN	at Florida State	L 60–69	9–16 (1–12)	Donald L. Tucker Civic Center (6,387); Tallahassee, FL
02/21/2015; 4:00 pm, RSN	No. 10 Notre Dame	L 70–87	9–17 (1–13)	Conte Forum (8,366); Chestnut Hill, MA
02/24/2015; 9:00 pm, ESPNU	at Pittsburgh	L 65–71	9–18 (1–14)	Peterson Events Center (9,142); Pittsburgh, PA
02/28/2015; 12:00 pm, RSN	NC State	W 79–63	10–18 (2–14)	Conte Forum (4,165); Chestnut Hill, MA
03/02/2015; 9:00 pm, ESPNU	at Virginia Tech	W 66–59	11–18 (3–14)	Cassell Coliseum (5,730); Blacksburg, VA
03/07/2015; 2:00 pm, RSN	Wake Forest	W 79–61	12–18 (4–14)	Conte Forum (4,838); Chestnut Hill, MA
ACC tournament
03/10/2015; 1:00 pm, ESPN2	vs. Georgia Tech; First Round	W 66–65	13–18	Greensboro Coliseum (N/A); Greensboro, NC
03/11/2015; 2:00 pm, ESPN	vs. No. 19 North Carolina; Second Round	L 63–81	13–19	Greensboro Coliseum (22,026); Greensboro, NC
*Non-conference game. ^{#}Rankings from AP Poll. (#) Tournament seedings in parentheses. All times are in Eastern Time.

== See also ==
- 2014–15 Boston College Eagles women's basketball team
