= 2014–15 Hartford Hawks men's basketball team =

American college basketball season

2014–15 Hartford Hawks men's basketball
- Conference: America East Conference
- Record: 14–16 (7–9 America East)
- Head coach: John Gallagher (5th season)
- Assistant coaches: Chris Gerlufsen; Matt Blue; Bill Dooley
- Home arena: Chase Arena at Reich Family Pavilion

2014–15 America East Conference men's basketball standings
	Conf.				Overall
Team	W		L	PCT	W		L	PCT
Albany †	15	–	1	.938	24	–	9	.727
Stony Brook	12	–	4	.750	23	–	12	.657
Vermont	12	–	4	.750	20	–	14	.588
New Hampshire	11	–	5	.688	19	–	13	.594
Hartford	7	–	9	.438	14	–	16	.467
UMass Lowell*	6	–	10	.375	12	–	17	.414
Binghamton	5	–	11	.313	6	–	26	.188
UMBC	2	–	14	.125	4	–	26	.133
Maine	2	–	14	.125	3	–	27	.100
† 2015 America East tournament winner *ineligible for postseason play due to Div. I transition

The 2014–15 Hartford Hawks men's basketball team represented the University of Hartford during the 2014–15 NCAA Division I men's basketball season. The Hawks, led by fifth year head coach John Gallagher, played their home games at the Chase Arena at Reich Family Pavilion and were members of the America East Conference. They finished the season 14–16, 7–9 in America East play to finish in fifth place. They lost in the quarterfinals of the America East tournament to New Hampshire.

== Roster ==
2014–15 Hartford Hawks men's basketball team
Players
Coaches

Pos.	#	Name	Height	Weight	Year	Previous school	Hometown
G	00	Wes Cole	6 ft 0 in (1.83 m)	165 lb (75 kg)	Sr	The Woodlands	The Woodlands, Texas
F	1	Mark Nwakamma	6 ft 6 in (1.98 m)	235 lb (107 kg)	Sr	Leander	Leander, Texas
G	2	Justin Graham	6 ft 1 in (1.85 m)	175 lb (79 kg)	So	Brandeis	San Antonio, Texas
G	4	Corban Wroe	6 ft 2 in (1.88 m)	195 lb (88 kg)	Sr	Australian Institute of Sport	Townsville, Queensland, Australia
G	5	Pancake Thomas	6 ft 3 in (1.91 m)	195 lb (88 kg)	Jr	Scotlandville Magnet; New Mexico	Baton Rouge, Louisiana
F	10	John Carroll	6 ft 8 in (2.03 m)	220 lb (100 kg)	RS Fr	IMG Academy; The Hill School	Dublin, Ireland
G	11	Taylor Dyson	6 ft 4 in (1.93 m)	185 lb (84 kg)	Jr	Box Hill Senior Secondary	Sassafras, Victoria, Australia
G	12	Jake Fay	6 ft 6 in (1.98 m)	195 lb (88 kg)	RS So	Brimmer and May; Fordham	Lynn, MA
G	13	Jalen Ross	5 ft 11 in (1.8 m)	175 lb (79 kg)	RS Jr	Greensboro Day School; Eastern Michigan	Greenbelt, MD
C	14	Dougal Weir	6 ft 9 in (2.06 m)	240 lb (109 kg)	So	Sydney Church of England	Sydney, New South Wales, Australia
G	15	Yolonzo Moore II	6 ft 2 in (1.88 m)	175 lb (79 kg)	Sr	Akins	Austin, Texas
G/F	20	Noah Arciero	6 ft 6 in (1.98 m)	190 lb (86 kg)	Fr	Saratoga Springs	Saratoga Springs, NY
F	21	Jack Hobbs	6 ft 7 in (2.01 m)	190 lb (86 kg)	Fr	South Anchorage; Impact Basketball	Anchorage, AK
G	22	Andrew Crowley	6 ft 2 in (1.88 m)	175 lb (79 kg)	Jr	Canton; Community College of Rhode Island	Canton, CT
G/F	33	Mark Plousis (W)	6 ft 5 in (1.96 m)	180 lb (82 kg)	Fr	Cardinal O'Hara	Havertown, PA
F	43	Nate Sikma	6 ft 7 in (2.01 m)	235 lb (107 kg)	Sr	Bellevue	Bellevue, Washington
F/C	50	Jamie Schneck	6 ft 8 in (2.03 m)	240 lb (109 kg)	Sr	Whitefish Bay	Whitefish Bay, Wisconsin

Head coach

- John Gallagher (Saint Joseph's)

Assistant coach(es)

- Chris Gerlufsen (Randolph–Macon)
- Matt Blue
- Bill Dooley (Richmond)

Legend

- (C) Team captain
- (S) Suspended
- (I) Ineligible
- (W) Walk-on
- Injured
- Current redshirt

Roster
Last update: April 28, 2020

== Schedule ==
Date time, TV	Rank^{#}	Opponent^{#}	Result	Record	Site (attendance) city, state
Non-conference regular season
11/14/2014*; 8:00 pm		vs. Sacred Heart; Connecticut 6 Classic	L 53–71	0–1	TD Bank Sports Center (750); Hamden, CT
11/16/2014*; 2:00 pm		Saint Peter's	W 51–50	1–1	Chase Arena at Reich Family Pavilion (1,876); Hartford, CT
11/19/2014*; 7:00 pm		Dartmouth	W 53–48	2–1	Chase Arena at Reich Family Pavilion (1,505); Hartford, CT
11/22/2014*; 7:00 pm		at Niagara	W 84–66	3–1	Gallagher Center (1,417); Lewiston, NY
11/25/2014*; 7:00 pm		at Quinnipiac	W 54–50	4–1	TD Bank Sports Center (838); Hamden, CT
11/28/2014*; 7:00 pm		Emerson	W 83–50	5–1	Chase Arena at Reich Family Pavilion (1,291); Hartford, CT
11/30/2014*; 2:00 pm		at Yale	L 57–69	5–2	John J. Lee Amphitheater (532); New Haven, CT
12/03/2014; 7:00 pm		at Vermont	L 69–81	5–3 (0–1)	Patrick Gym (1,930); Burlington, VT
12/06/2014*; 7:00 pm		Central Connecticut; Rivalry	L 47–56	5–4	Chase Arena at Reich Family Pavilion (1,579); Hartford, CT
12/09/2014*; 7:00 pm		at Holy Cross	W 79–61	6–4	Hart Center (1,127); Worcester, MA
12/13/2014*; 7:00 pm		Rider	L 61–63	6–5	Chase Arena at Reich Family Pavilion (1,444); Hartford, CT
12/21/2014*; 2:30 pm		FIU	W 82–69	7–5	Chase Arena at Reich Family Pavilion (2,310); Hartford, CT
12/30/2014*; 7:00 pm, ESPN3		at No. 14 Notre Dame	L 60–87	7–6	Edmund P. Joyce Center (6,803); South Bend, IN
01/03/2015*; 7:00 pm, SECN		at Texas A&M	L 49–58	7–7	Reed Arena (6,325); College Station, TX
01/07/2015; 7:00 pm		Binghamton	W 69–59	8–7 (1–1)	Chase Arena at Reich Family Pavilion (1,009); Hartford, CT
01/14/2015; 7:00 pm		at New Hampshire	W 68–67	9–7 (2–1)	Lundholm Gym (463); Durham, NH
01/17/2015; 7:00 pm		UMass Lowell	W 68–62 ^{OT}	10–7 (3–1)	Chase Arena at Reich Family Pavilion (2,027); Hartford, CT
01/19/2015; 1:00 pm		at UMBC	W 65–63	11–7 (4–1)	Retriever Activities Center (608); Catonsville, MD
01/22/2015; 7:00 pm, ESPN3		Albany	L 53–62	11–8 (4–2)	Chase Arena at Reich Family Pavilion (1,907); Hartford, CT
01/25/2015; 2:00 pm		Maine	L 61–70	11–9 (4–3)	Chase Arena at Reich Family Pavilion (1,926); Hartford, CT
01/28/2015; 7:00 pm, ESPN3		at Stony Brook	L 66–72	11–10 (4–4)	Island Federal Credit Union Arena (2,816); Stony Brook, NY
01/31/2014; 7:00 pm, ESPN3		Vermont	L 46–65	11–11 (4–5)	Chase Arena at Reich Family Pavilion (2,078); Hartford, CT
02/03/2015; 7:00 pm, ESPN3		at Binghamton	W 62–61	12–11 (5–5)	Binghamton University Events Center (4,445); Vestal, NY
02/10/2015; 7:00 pm		New Hampshire	L 70–76 ^{OT}	12–12 (5–6)	Chase Arena at Reich Family Pavilion (1,751); Hartford, CT
02/14/2015; 2:00 pm		at UMass Lowell	L 63–69	12–13 (5–7)	Costello Athletic Center (131); Lowell, MA
02/17/2015; 7:00 pm		UMBC	W 55–52	13–13 (6–7)	Chase Arena at Reich Family Pavilion (1,335); Hartford, CT
02/20/2015; 7:00 pm, ESPNU		at Albany	L 64–70	13–14 (6–8)	SEFCU Arena (4,123); Albany, NY
02/25/2015; 7:00 pm		at Maine	W 63–60	14–14 (7–8)	Cross Insurance Center (1,544); Bangor, ME
02/28/2015; 7:00 pm		Stony Brook	L 59–74	14–15 (7–9)	Chase Arena at Reich Family Pavilion (2,431); Hartford, CT
America East Men's tournament
03/04/2015; 7:00 pm, ESPN3		at New Hampshire; Quarterfinals	L 63–67 ^{OT}	14–16	Lundholm Gym (1,848); Durham, NH
*Non-conference game. ^{#}Rankings from AP Poll. (#) Tournament seedings in parentheses. All times are in Eastern Time.
