= 2014–15 Pittsburgh Panthers men's basketball team =

American college basketball season

2014–15 Pittsburgh Panthers men's basketball

NIT, First Round, L 54–60 vs. George Washington
- Conference: Atlantic Coast Conference
- Record: 19–15 (8–10 ACC)
- Head coach: Jamie Dixon (12th season)
- Assistant coaches: Brandin Knight (7th season); Bill Barton (4th season); Marlon Williamson (1st season)
- Home arena: Petersen Events Center (Capacity: 12,508)

2014–15 ACC men's basketball standings
	Conf.				Overall
Team	W		L	PCT	W		L	PCT
No. 6 Virginia	16	–	2	.889	30	–	4	.882
No. 4 Duke	15	–	3	.833	35	–	4	.897
No. 8 Notre Dame †	14	–	4	.778	32	–	6	.842
No. 15 North Carolina	11	–	7	.611	26	–	12	.684
Miami (FL)	10	–	8	.556	25	–	13	.658
NC State	10	–	8	.556	22	–	14	.611
Syracuse	9	–	9	.500	18	–	13	.581
Clemson	8	–	10	.444	16	–	15	.516
Florida State	8	–	10	.444	17	–	16	.515
Pittsburgh	8	–	10	.444	19	–	15	.559
Wake Forest	5	–	13	.278	13	–	19	.406
Boston College	4	–	14	.222	13	–	19	.406
Georgia Tech	3	–	15	.167	12	–	19	.387
Virginia Tech	2	–	16	.111	11	–	22	.333
No. 17 Louisville*	0	–	6	.000	0	–	8	.000
† ACC tournament winner Rankings from AP poll *Louisville: 24 reg. season games, 4 postseason games vacated due to sanctions against the program; Disputed Record-(27-9)(12-6)

The 2014–15 Pittsburgh Panthers men's basketball team represented the University of Pittsburgh during the 2014–15 NCAA Division I men's basketball season. The team played its home games at the Petersen Events Center in Pittsburgh, Pennsylvania. The Panthers were led by twelfth-year head coach Jamie Dixon. They were members of the Atlantic Coast Conference. They finished the season 19–15, 8–10 in ACC play to finish in a three-way tie for ninth place. They lost in the first round of the ACC tournament to NC State. They were invited to the National Invitation Tournament where they lost in the first round to George Washington.

== Previous season ==
The Panthers finished the season 26–10, 11–7 in ACC play to finish in fifth place. They advanced to the semifinals of the ACC tournament where they lost to Virginia. They received an at-large bid to the NCAA tournament as a number nine seed where they defeated Colorado in the first round before losing in the second round to number one seeded Florida.

== Departures ==
Name	Number	Pos.	Height	Weight	Year	Hometown	Notes
Lamar Patterson	21	G/F	6'5"	195	RS Senior	Lancaster, PA	Graduated/2014 NBA draft
Talib Zanna	42	F	6'9"	230	RS Senior	Kaduna, Nigeria	Graduated

=== Incoming transfers ===
Name	Number	Pos.	Height	Weight	Year	Hometown	Previous School
Sheldon Jeter	21	F	6'8"	220	Sophomore	Beaver Falls, PA	Junior college transfer from Polk State College
Tyrone Haughton	44	C	6'9"	217	Junior	Miami, FL	Junior college transfer from Iowa Western Community College

== Class of 2014 signees ==
College recruiting information
Name	Hometown	School	Height	Weight	Commit date
Ryan Luther; SF	Gibsonia, PA	Hampton	6 ft 9 in (2.06 m)	210 lb (95 kg)	Oct 24, 2013
Ryan Luther; SF	Recruit ratings: Scout: Rivals: 247Sports: ESPN:				
Cameron Johnson; SG	Hagerstown, MD	Our Lady of the Sacred Heart	6 ft 6 in (1.98 m)	185 lb (84 kg)	Apr 21, 2014
Cameron Johnson; SG	Recruit ratings: Scout: Rivals: (NR)				
Overall recruit ranking:
Note: In many cases, Scout, Rivals, 247Sports, On3, and ESPN may conflict in their listings of height and weight.; In these cases, the average was taken. ESPN grades are on a 100-point scale.; Sources: "2014 Team Ranking". Rivals.

== Roster ==
2014–15 Pittsburgh Panthers men's basketball team
Players
Coaches

Pos.	#	Name	Height	Weight	Year	Previous school	Hometown
G	0	James Robinson	6 ft 3 in (1.91 m)	200 lb (91 kg)	Jr	DeMatha Catholic	Mitchellville, MD
F	1	Jamel Artis	6 ft 7 in (2.01 m)	230 lb (104 kg)	So	Notre Dame Prep (Fitchburg, MA)	Baltimore, MD
F	2	Michael Young	6 ft 8 in (2.03 m)	245 lb (111 kg)	So	St. Benedict's (Newark, NJ)	Duquesne, PA
G	3	Cameron Wright (redshirt)	6 ft 4 in (1.93 m)	205 lb (93 kg)	RS Sr	Benedictine	Cleveland, OH
F	4	Ryan Luther	6 ft 9 in (2.06 m)	215 lb (98 kg)	Fr	Hampton	Gibsonia, PA
F	5	Durand Johnson (S) (redshirt)	6 ft 6 in (1.98 m)	195 lb (88 kg)	RS Jr	Brewster Academy (Wolfeboro, NH)	Baltimore, MD
F	11	Derrick Randall	6 ft 8 in (2.03 m)	240 lb (109 kg)	Sr	South Kent (South Kent, CT)	Brooklyn, NY
G/F	12	Chris Jones (redshirt)	6 ft 6 in (1.98 m)	210 lb (95 kg)	RS So	Teaneck	Teaneck, NJ
G	13	Josh Newkirk	6 ft 1 in (1.85 m)	175 lb (79 kg)	So	Word of God	Raleigh, NC
F	15	Aron Nwankwo (W) (redshirt)	6 ft 7.5 in (2.02 m)	215 lb (98 kg)	RS Sr	Baltimore City College	Baltimore, MD
F	21	Sheldon Jeter	6 ft 8 in (2.03 m)	225 lb (102 kg)	So	Beaver Falls; Polk State College	Beaver Falls, PA
G	22	Joshua Ko (W)	6 ft 1 in (1.85 m)	150 lb (68 kg)	So	Kalaheo	Kailua, HI
G	23	Cameron Johnson	6 ft 7 in (2.01 m)	185 lb (84 kg)	Fr	Our Lady of the Sacred Heart	Moon Township, PA
G	24	Mike Lecak (W) (redshirt)	6 ft 2 in (1.88 m)	175 lb (79 kg)	RS Jr	North Canyon (Phoenix, AZ); Wheeling Jesuit	Pittsburgh, PA
C	44	Tyrone Haughton	6 ft 9 in (2.06 m)	220 lb (100 kg)	Jr	Dr. Kopp; Iowa Western CC	Miami, FL
C	50	Joseph Uchebo	6 ft 10 in (2.08 m)	260 lb (118 kg)	Jr	Word of God (Raleigh, NC); Chipola College	Enugu, Nigeria

Head coach

- Jamie Dixon (TCU)

Assistant coach(es)

- Marlon Williamson (Youngstown State)
- Brandin Knight (Pittsburgh)
- Bill Barton (Salem State)

Legend

- (C) Team captain
- (S) Suspended
- (I) Ineligible
- (W) Walk-on
- Injured
- Current redshirt

Roster

== Schedule ==
Date time, TV	Rank^{#}	Opponent^{#}	Result	Record	Site (attendance) city, state
Bahamas Foreign Tour
Sat. Aug. 2*; 3:00 p.m.		Pyramid Food Rockets	W 101–62		Kendal G.L. Isaacs Gym (322); Nassau, Bahamas
Sun. Aug. 3*; 3:00 p.m.		Bahamas All-Stars	W 113–59		Kendal G.L. Isaacs Gym (547); Nassau, Bahamas
Tue. Aug. 5*; 7:00 p.m.		Street Legends All-Stars	W 94–55		Kendal G.L. Isaacs Gym (313); Nassau, Bahamas
Wed. Aug. 6*; 7:00 p.m.		Atlantis All-Stars	W 124–53		Kendal G.L. Isaacs Gym (412); Nassau, Bahamas
Scrimmage
Fri. Oct. 3*; 7:00 p.m.		Blue-Gold Scrimmage; Oakland Zoo Scrimmage			Petersen Events Center (N/A); Pittsburgh, PA
Sun. Oct. 19*; 3:00 p.m.		Blue-Gold Scrimmage; Maggie Dixon Heart Health Fair/Fan Fest			Petersen Events Center (N/A); Pittsburgh, PA
Exhibition
Fri. Oct. 31*; 7:00 p.m.		Indiana (PA)	W 72–58		Petersen Events Center (5,819); Pittsburgh, PA
Fri. Nov. 7*; 7:00 p.m.		Philadelphia	W 82–71		Petersen Events Center (6,157); Pittsburgh, PA
Regular season
Fri. Nov. 14*; 7:00 p.m., ESPN3		Niagara	W 78–45	1–0	Petersen Events Center (9,749); Pittsburgh, PA
Sun. Nov. 16*; 1:00 p.m., ACCRSN		Samford; Maui Invitational Tournament Opening Round	W 63–56	2–0	Petersen Events Center (8,249); Pittsburgh, PA
Fri. Nov. 21*; 12:00 a.m.		at Hawaiʻi	L 70–74	2–1	Hawaii War Memorial Gym (1,203); Wailuku, HI
Mon. Nov. 24*; 9:00 p.m., ESPNU		vs. Chaminade; Maui Invitational Tournament quarterfinals	W 81–68	3–1	Lahaina Civic Center (2,400); Maui, HI
Tue. Nov. 25*; 10:00 p.m., ESPN		vs. No. 15 San Diego State; Maui Invitational Tournament semifinals	L 57–74	3–2	Lahaina Civic Center (2,400); Maui, HI
Wed. Nov. 26*; 7:30 p.m., ESPN2		vs. Kansas State; Maui Invitational Tournament 3rd Place Game	W 70–47	4–2	Lahaina Civic Center (2,400); Maui, HI
Tue. Dec. 2*; 7:00 p.m., ESPN2		at Indiana; ACC–Big Ten Challenge	L 69–81	4–3	Assembly Hall (17,472); Bloomington, IN
Fri. Dec. 5*; 7:00 p.m., ESPN3		vs. Duquesne; The City Game	W 76–62	5–3	Consol Energy Center (14,905); Pittsburgh, PA
Sat. Dec. 13*; 2:00 p.m., ESPNU		St. Bonaventure	W 58–54	6–3	Petersen Events Center (9,425); Pittsburgh, PA
Wed. Dec. 17*; 7:00 p.m., ESPN3		Manhattan	W 65–56	7–3	Petersen Events Center (8,149); Pittsburgh, PA
Sat. Dec. 20*; 4:00 p.m., ACCRSN		Oakland	W 81–77 ^{OT}	8–3	Petersen Events Center (9,049); Pittsburgh, PA
Tue. Dec. 23*; 7:00 p.m., ESPN3		Holy Cross	W 58–39	9–3	Petersen Events Center (8,825); Pittsburgh, PA
Tue. Dec. 30*; 7:30 p.m., ESPN3		Florida Gulf Coast	W 71–54	10–3	Petersen Events Center (10,249); Pittsburgh, PA
Sat. Jan. 3; 12:00 p.m., ACCN		at NC State	L 50–68	10–4 (0–1)	PNC Arena (16,197); Raleigh, NC
Tue. Jan. 6; 9:00 p.m., ACCRSN		at Boston College	W 61–60 ^{OT}	11–4 (1–1)	Conte Forum (2,213); Chestnut Hill, MA
Sat. Jan. 10; 12:00 p.m., ACCRSN		Clemson	L 62–71	11–5 (1–2)	Petersen Events Center (12,508); Pittsburgh, PA
Wed. Jan. 14; 9:00 p.m., ACCRSN		Florida State	W 73–64	12–5 (2–2)	Petersen Events Center (10,989); Pittsburgh, PA
Sat. Jan. 17; 4:00 p.m., ACCN		Georgia Tech	W 70–65	13–5 (3–2)	Petersen Events Center (12,508); Pittsburgh, PA
Mon. Jan. 19; 7:00 p.m., ESPN		at No. 5 Duke	L 65–79	13–6 (3–3)	Cameron Indoor Stadium (9,314); Durham, NC
Sun. Jan. 25; 4:00 p.m., CBS		No. 10 Louisville	L 68–80	13–7 (3–4)	Petersen Events Center (12,508); Pittsburgh, PA
Tue. Jan. 27; 7:00 p.m., ESPNU		at Virginia Tech	L 67–70 ^{OT}	13–8 (3–5)	Cassell Coliseum (5,206); Blacksburg, VA
Sat. Jan. 31; 12:00 p.m., ACCN		No. 8 Notre Dame	W 76–72	14–8 (4–5)	Petersen Events Center (12,508); Pittsburgh, PA
Mon. Feb. 2*; 7:00 p.m., ESPN3		Bryant	W 72–67	15–8	Petersen Events Center (7,749); Pittsburgh, PA
Sat. Feb. 7; 4:00 p.m., ESPN2		Syracuse	W 83–77	16–8 (5–5)	Petersen Events Center (12,508); Pittsburgh, PA
Wed. Feb. 11; 8:00 p.m., ACCN		at No. 9 Louisville	L 56–69	16–9 (5–6)	KFC Yum! Center (22,132); Louisville, KY
Sat. Feb. 14; 12:00 p.m., ACCN		No. 12 North Carolina	W 89–76	17–9 (6–6)	Petersen Events Center (12,508); Pittsburgh, PA
Mon. Feb. 16; 7:00 p.m., ESPN		at No. 2 Virginia	L 49–61	17–10 (6–7)	John Paul Jones Arena (13,953); Charlottesville, VA
Sat. Feb. 21; 12:00 p.m., ACCN		at Syracuse	W 65–61	18–10 (7–7)	Carrier Dome (30,144); Syracuse, NY
Tue. Feb. 24; 9:00 p.m., ESPNU		Boston College	W 71–65	19–10 (8–7)	Petersen Events Center (9,142); Pittsburgh, PA
Sun. Mar. 1; 6:30 p.m., ESPNU		at Wake Forest	L 66–69	19–11 (8–8)	Lawrence Joel Coliseum (10,109); Winston-Salem, NC
Wed. Mar. 4; 8:00 p.m., ACCN		Miami (FL)	L 63–67	19–12 (8–9)	Petersen Events Center (10,549); Pittsburgh, PA
Sat. Mar. 7; 12:00 p.m., ESPN2		at Florida State	L 52–61	19–13 (8–10)	Donald L. Tucker Civic Center (6,276); Tallahassee, FL
ACC Tournament
Wed. Mar. 11; 7:00 p.m., ESPN2/ACCN	No. (10)	vs. No. (7) NC State; Second round	L 70–81	19–14	Greensboro Coliseum (22,026); Greensboro, NC
NIT
Tue. Mar. 17*; 7:00 p.m., ESPN	No. (4)	No. (5) George Washington; First round	L 54–60	19–15	Petersen Events Center (3,049); Pittsburgh, PA
*Non-conference game. ^{#}Rankings from AP Poll. (#) Tournament seedings in parentheses. All times are in Eastern Time. (#) during NIT is seed within region.
