= 2014–15 Syracuse Orange men's basketball team =

American college basketball season

2014–15 Syracuse Orange men's basketball
- Conference: Atlantic Coast Conference
- Record: 18–13 (9–9 ACC)
- Head coach: Jim Boeheim (39th season)
- Assistant coaches: Mike Hopkins; Adrian Autry; Gerry McNamara
- Home arena: Carrier Dome

2014–15 ACC men's basketball standings
	Conf.				Overall
Team	W		L	PCT	W		L	PCT
No. 6 Virginia	16	–	2	.889	30	–	4	.882
No. 4 Duke	15	–	3	.833	35	–	4	.897
No. 8 Notre Dame †	14	–	4	.778	32	–	6	.842
No. 15 North Carolina	11	–	7	.611	26	–	12	.684
Miami (FL)	10	–	8	.556	25	–	13	.658
NC State	10	–	8	.556	22	–	14	.611
Syracuse	9	–	9	.500	18	–	13	.581
Clemson	8	–	10	.444	16	–	15	.516
Florida State	8	–	10	.444	17	–	16	.515
Pittsburgh	8	–	10	.444	19	–	15	.559
Wake Forest	5	–	13	.278	13	–	19	.406
Boston College	4	–	14	.222	13	–	19	.406
Georgia Tech	3	–	15	.167	12	–	19	.387
Virginia Tech	2	–	16	.111	11	–	22	.333
No. 17 Louisville*	0	–	6	.000	0	–	8	.000
† ACC tournament winner Rankings from AP poll *Louisville: 24 reg. season games, 4 postseason games vacated due to sanctions against the program; Disputed Record-(27-9)(12-6)

The 2014–15 Syracuse Orange men's basketball team represented Syracuse University during the 2014–15 NCAA Division I men's basketball season. The Orange were led by thirty-ninth-year head coach Jim Boeheim and played their home games at the Carrier Dome in Syracuse, New York. They were second-year members of the Atlantic Coast Conference (ACC).

The Orange did not participate in the 2014–2015 postseason. The team self-imposed a postseason ban as a response to an ongoing NCAA investigation into potential past infractions by the team. Syracuse University initiated the case, which includes academics, when it self-reported potential athletic department violations to the NCAA in 2007. School officials said that none of the conduct occurred after 2012, and no current student-athlete is involved. The ban included the NCAA tournament, ACC tournament and NIT.

== Preseason ==
=== Departures ===
Name	Number	Pos.	Height	Weight	Year	Hometown	Notes
Jerami Grant	3	F	6'8"	203	Sophomore	Hyattsville, Maryland	2014 NBA draft 2nd-round pick by Philadelphia 76ers
C. J. Fair	5	F	6'8"	215	Senior	Baltimore, MD	Graduated / Undrafted in 2014 NBA draft
Tyler Ennis	11	G	6'2"	180	Freshman	Brampton, Ontario	2014 NBA draft 1st-round pick by Phoenix Suns
Baye Moussa Keita	12	C	6'10"	215	Senior	Saint-Louis, Senegal	Graduated
Russ DeRemer	23	G	6'5"	203	Senior	Wrentham, MA	Graduated
Nolan Hart	4	G	5'10"	152	Senior	Albany, NY	Graduated

=== Recruits ===
College recruiting information
Name	Hometown	School	Height	Weight	Commit date
Chris McCullough; PF	Bronx, NY	Brewster Academy	6 ft 10 in (2.08 m)	220 lb (100 kg)	Nov 5, 2012
Chris McCullough; PF	Recruit ratings: Scout: Rivals: 247Sports: ESPN:				
Kaleb Joseph; PG	Nashua, NH	Cushing Academy	6 ft 3 in (1.91 m)	165 lb (75 kg)	Aug 17, 2013
Kaleb Joseph; PG	Recruit ratings: Scout: Rivals: 247Sports: ESPN:				
Overall recruit ranking: Scout: #10 ESPN: #12
Note: In many cases, Scout, Rivals, 247Sports, On3, and ESPN may conflict in their listings of height and weight.; In these cases, the average was taken. ESPN grades are on a 100-point scale.; Sources: "2014 Syracuse Signees". Rivals.; "2014 Syracuse Signees". Scout.; "2014 Syracuse Signees". ESPN.; "Scout.com Team Recruiting Rankings". Scout.; "2014 Team Ranking". Rivals.

== Roster ==
2014–15 Syracuse Orange men's basketball team
Players
Coaches

Pos.	#	Name	Height	Weight	Year	Previous school	Hometown
F	0	Michael Gbinije	6 ft 7 in (2.01 m)	200 lb (91 kg)	Jr	Benedictine College Prep	Richmond, Virginia
F	1	Mike Sutton	6 ft 2 in (1.88 m)	195 lb (88 kg)	Fr	Norwich	Norwich, New York
F	2	B. J. Johnson	6 ft 7 in (2.01 m)	185 lb (84 kg)	So	Lower Merion	Ardmore, Pennsylvania
F	3	Carter Sanderson	6 ft 2 in (1.88 m)	185 lb (84 kg)	Sr	Lipscomb Academy; Lipscomb	Nashville, Tennessee
G	4	Ron Patterson	6 ft 2 in (1.88 m)	200 lb (91 kg)	Fr	Brewster Academy	Broad Ripple, Indiana
F	5	Chris McCullough	6 ft 10 in (2.08 m)	220 lb (100 kg)	Fr	IMG Academy	Bronx, New York
G	10	Trevor Cooney	6 ft 4 in (1.93 m)	195 lb (88 kg)	RS Jr	Sanford	Wilmington, Delaware
G	13	Christian White	5 ft 10 in (1.78 m)	180 lb (82 kg)	Jr	Aquinas Institute	Rochester, New York
G	14	Kaleb Joseph	6 ft 3 in (1.91 m)	165 lb (75 kg)	Fr	Cushing Academy	Nashua, New Hampshire
F	21	Tyler Roberson	6 ft 8 in (2.03 m)	212 lb (96 kg)	So	Roselle Catholic	Union, New Jersey
F	25	Rakeem Christmas	6 ft 9 in (2.06 m)	242 lb (110 kg)	Sr	Academy of the New Church	Bryn Athyn, Pennsylvania
F	32	DaJuan Coleman	6 ft 9 in (2.06 m)	255 lb (116 kg)	Jr	Jamesville-DeWitt	Jamesville, New York
F	33	Albert Nassar	6 ft 6 in (1.98 m)	195 lb (88 kg)	Sr	South Fork	Stuart, Florida
F	34	Doyin Akintobi-Adeyeye	6 ft 6 in (1.98 m)	235 lb (107 kg)	So	Uniondale	Uniondale, New York
C	35	Chinoso Obokoh	6 ft 9 in (2.06 m)	215 lb (98 kg)	RS So	Bishop Kearney	Rochester, New York

Head coach

- Jim Boeheim, 39th yr. (Syracuse, 1966)

Assistant coach(es)

- Mike Hopkins, 19th yr. (Syracuse, 1993)
- Gerry McNamara, 6th yr. (Syracuse, 2007)
- Adrian Autry, 4th yr. (Syracuse, 1994)

Legend

- (C) Team captain
- (S) Suspended
- (I) Ineligible
- (W) Walk-on
- Injured
- Current redshirt

Roster
Last update: 2014-11-27

== Schedule ==
Date time, TV	Rank^{#}	Opponent^{#}	Result	Record	High points	High rebounds	High assists	Site (attendance) city, state
Exhibition
Nov 2*; 1:00 pm, TWCSC	No. 23	Carleton	W 76-68		19 – Joseph	6 – Tied	4 – Tied	Carrier Dome (7,812); Syracuse, NY
Nov 10*; 7:00 pm, TWCSC	No. 23	Adrian	W 84–35		13 – McCullough	16 – McCullough	6 – Gbinije	Carrier Dome (7,680); Syracuse, NY
Regular season
Nov 14*; 7:00 pm, ESPN3	No. 23	Kennesaw State; 2K Sports Classic	W 89–42	1–0	21 – Christmas	11 – McCullough	6 – Joseph	Carrier Dome (22,833); Syracuse, NY
Nov 16*; 4:00 pm, ESPNU	No. 23	Hampton; 2K Sports Classic	W 65-47	2-0	15 – Christmas	16 – Christmas	5 – Joseph	Carrier Dome (22,848); Syracuse, NY
Nov 20*; 9:00 pm, ESPN2	No. 23	vs. California; 2K Sports Classic semifinals	L 59–73	2–1	13 – Joseph, Gbinije	8 – Johnson	3 – Joseph	Madison Square Garden (11,541); New York City, NY
Nov 21*; 5:00 pm, ESPN2	No. 23	vs. Iowa; 2K Sports Classic third-place game	W 66–63	3–1	20 – McCullough	9 – McCullough	8 – Joseph	Madison Square Garden (11,255); New York City, NY
Nov 25*; 7:00 pm, RSN		Loyola (MD)	W 70–37	4–1	18 – Christmas	9 – Christmas	7 – Joseph	Carrier Dome (17,691); Syracuse, NY
Nov 28*; 7:00 pm, ESPN3		Holy Cross	W 72–48	5–1	25 – Christmas	13 – McCullough	6 – Joseph	Carrier Dome (19,167); Syracuse, NY
Dec 2*; 7:30 pm, ESPN		at No. 17 Michigan; ACC–Big Ten Challenge	L 65–68	5–2	18 – Irvin	12 – McCullough	6 – LeVert	Crisler Center (12,707); Ann Arbor, MI
Dec 6*; 5:15 pm, ESPN2		St. John's	L 57–69	5–3	24 – Harrison	16 – Obekpa	5 – Tied	Carrier Dome (24,884); Syracuse, NY
Dec 14*; 4:00 pm, ESPNU		Louisiana Tech	W 71–69	6–3	25 – Cooney	17 – Roberson	4 – Joseph	Carrier Dome (19,156); Syracuse, NY
Dec 20*; 1:00 pm, FOX		at No. 7 Villanova	L 77–82 ^{OT}	6–4	18 – Tied	8 – Christmas	10 – Joseph	Wells Fargo Center (18,369); Philadelphia, PA
Dec 22*; 7:00 pm, ESPNU		Colgate	W 78–43	7–4	20 – Cooney	11 – Christmas	4 – Tied	Carrier Dome (18,905); Syracuse, NY
Dec 28*; 2:00 pm, ESPNU		Long Beach State	W 85–67	8–4	24 – Tied	10 – Christmas	8 – Gbinije	Carrier Dome (22,508); Syracuse, NY
Dec 31*; 6:00 pm, ESPNU		Cornell	W 61–44	9–4	19 – Christmas	9 – Christmas	4 – Cooney	Carrier Dome (19,288); Syracuse, NY
ACC regular season
Jan 3; 12:00 pm, RSN		at Virginia Tech	W 68–66	10–4 (1–0)	18 – Cooney	17 – Roberson	3 – 4 Tied	Cassell Coliseum (6,838); Blacksburg, VA
Jan 7; 7:00 pm, ESPNU		at Georgia Tech	W 46–45	11–4 (2–0)	18 – Christmas	10 – Gbinije	5 – Joseph	Hank McCamish Pavilion (7,831); Atlanta, GA
Jan 11; 8:00 pm, ESPNU		Florida State	W 70–57	12–4 (3–0)	28 – Cooney	11 – Christmas	7 – Joseph	Carrier Dome (24,257); Syracuse, NY
Jan 13; 8:00 pm, ACCN		Wake Forest	W 86–83 ^{OT}	13–4 (4–0)	35 – Christmas	11 – Gbinije	7 – Gbinije	Carrier Dome (23,367); Syracuse, NY
Jan 17; 4:00 pm, ACCN		at Clemson	L 53–66	13–5 (4–1)	21 – Christmas	13 – Roberson	2 – 3 Tied	Littlejohn Coliseum (10,000); Clemson, SC
Jan 20; 7:00 pm, ESPNU		Boston College	W 69–61	14–5 (5–1)	17 – Gbinije	8 – Gbinije	7 – Joseph	Carrier Dome (23,781); Syracuse, NY
Jan 24; 4:00 pm, ESPN2		Miami (FL)	L 62–66	14–6 (5–2)	23 – Christmas	15 – Jekiri	8 – Rodriguez	Carrier Dome (30,677); Syracuse, NY
Jan 26; 7:00 pm, ESPN		at No. 13 North Carolina	L 83–93	14–7 (5–3)	28 – Cooney	12 – Christmas	5 – Roberson	Dean Smith Center (19,856); Chapel Hill, NC
Feb 3; 9:00 pm, ESPNU		Virginia Tech	W 72–70	15–7 (6–3)	19 – Bibbs	12 – Christmas	7 – Gbinije	Carrier Dome (22,928); Syracuse, NY
Feb 7; 7:00 pm, ESPN2		at Pittsburgh	L 77–83	15–8 (6–4)	23 – Tied	12 – Christmas	5 – Cooney	Peterson Events Center (12,508); Pittsburgh, PA
Feb 11; 7:00 pm, ESPN2		at Boston College	W 70–56	16–8 (7–4)	21 – Gbinije	10 – Christmas	4 – Gbinije, Joseph	Conte Forum (5,476); Chestnut Hill, MA
Feb 14; 6:00 pm, ESPN		No. 4 Duke	L 72–80	16–9 (7–5)	27 – Gbinije	10 – Roberson	5 – Christmas	Carrier Dome (35,446); Syracuse, NY
Feb 18; 7:00 pm, ESPN		No. 12 Louisville	W 69–59	17–9 (8–5)	29 – Christmas	9 – Roberson	6 – Gbinije	Carrier Dome (26,160); Syracuse, NY
Feb 21; 12:00 pm, ACCN		Pittsburgh	L 61–65	17–10 (8–6)	20 – Christmas	12 – Christmas	6 – Gbinije	Carrier Dome (30,144); Syracuse, NY
Feb 24; 8:00 pm, ACCN		at No. 9 Notre Dame	W 65–60	18–10 (9–6)	19 – Johnson	12 – Christmas	3 – Roberson	Purcell Pavilion (9,149); South Bend, IN
Feb 28; 7:00 pm, ESPN		at No. 4 Duke	L 54–73	18–11 (9–7)	16 – Roberson	9 – Roberson	4 – Patterson	Cameron Indoor Stadium (9,314); Durham, NC
Mar 2; 7:00 pm, ESPN		No. 2 Virginia	L 47–59	18–12 (9–8)	14 – Cooney	6 – Gbinije	3 – Tied	Carrier Dome (25,338); Syracuse, NY
Mar 7; 12:00 pm, CBS		at NC State	L 57–71	18–13 (9–9)	16 – Roberson	12 – Christmas	5 – Gbinije	PNC Arena (18,659); Raleigh, NC
*Non-conference game. ^{#}Rankings from AP Poll. (#) Tournament seedings in parentheses. All times are in Eastern Time.

== Rankings ==
Ranking movement Legend: ██ Increase in ranking. ██ Decrease in ranking. (RV) Received votes but unranked. (NR) Not ranked.
Poll	Pre	Wk 2	Wk 3	Wk 4	Wk 5	Wk 6	Wk 7	Wk 8	Wk 9	Wk 10	Wk 11	Wk 12	Wk 13	Wk 14	Wk 15	Wk 16	Wk 17	Wk 18	Wk 19	Final
AP	23	23	RV	RV						RV										N/A
Coaches	24	24	RV	RV						RV										

== 2015–16 Recruiting ==
College recruiting information
Name	Hometown	School	Height	Weight	Commit date
Moustapha Diagne; C	Dakar, Senegal	Pope John XXIII High School	6 ft 9 in (2.06 m)	240 lb (110 kg)	May 31, 2014
Moustapha Diagne; C	Recruit ratings: Scout: Rivals: (89)				
Franklin Howard; SG	Fairfax, VA	Paul VI High School	6 ft 5 in (1.96 m)	185 lb (84 kg)	Apr 14, 2014
Franklin Howard; SG	Recruit ratings: Scout: Rivals: (82)				
Tyler Lydon; PF	Pine Plains, NY	Brewster Academy	6 ft 8 in (2.03 m)	181 lb (82 kg)	Oct 17, 2013
Tyler Lydon; PF	Recruit ratings: Scout: Rivals: (83)				
Malachi Richardson; SG	Hamilton, NJ	Trenton Catholic Academy	6 ft 5 in (1.96 m)	190 lb (86 kg)	Dec 13, 2013
Malachi Richardson; SG	Recruit ratings: Scout: Rivals: (95)				
Overall recruit ranking:
Note: In many cases, Scout, Rivals, 247Sports, On3, and ESPN may conflict in their listings of height and weight.; In these cases, the average was taken. ESPN grades are on a 100-point scale.; Sources: "2015 Syracuse Signees". Rivals.; "2015 Syracuse Signees". Scout.; "2015 Syracuse Signees". ESPN.; "Scout.com Team Recruiting Rankings". Scout.; "2015 Team Ranking". Rivals.
