= Hall of Fame Tip-Off =

Basketball tournament in Connecticut, US

- Sport: College basketball
- Founded: 2011
- No. of teams: 4
- Country: United States
- Venues: Mohegan Sun Arena; Uncasville, Connecticut
- Most recent champion: Mississippi State
- Most titles: Purdue (2)
- Broadcaster: ESPN/Local networks
- Sponsor: Metro Atlantic Athletic Conference
- Website: hallfoffametipoff.com

The Hall of Fame Tip Off is an NCAA-exempt tournament organized by the Naismith Basketball Hall of Fame and is sponsored by the Metro Atlantic Athletic Conference. It features four NCAA Division I men’s college basketball teams. The tournament takes place at the Mohegan Sun Arena in Uncasville, Connecticut. Under the previous format teams were separated into two divisions, the Springfield and Naismith. Each division had 4 teams.

== History ==
=== Champions ===
Naismith Bracket Champion		Springfield Bracket Champion
Year	Team	
2011	Kentucky	Long Island
2012	Ohio State	Loyola Maryland
2013	North Carolina	Belmont
2014	Providence	Northeastern
2015	Purdue	Buffalo
2016	Duke	Grand Canyon
2017	Texas Tech	South Alabama
2018	Michigan	Holy Cross
2019	Virginia	Rider
2020	The event was not held in 2020 due to the COVID-19 Pandemic	
2021	Purdue	N/A
2022	Maryland	N/A
2023	Mississippi State	N/A
2024	Showcase Format – No Tournament	
2025	Showcase Format – No Tournament	
2026	Showcase Format – No Tournament	

== Brackets ==
* – Denotes overtime period

=== 2011 ===
==== Naismith Division ====
Naismith Semifinals; November 19
2	Kentucky	85
Penn State	47
Old Dominion	68*
South Florida	60

Naismith Championship; November 20
2	Kentucky	62
Old Dominion	52
Consolation; November 20
Penn State	53
South Florida	49

==== Springfield Division ====
Springfield Semifinals; November 19
Long Island	60
Radford	47
Vermont	84
Marist	75

Springfield Championship; November 20
Long Island	80
Vermont	75
Consolation; November 20
Radford	47
Marist	60

=== 2012 ===
==== Naismith Division ====
Naismith Semifinals; November 17
4	Ohio State	69
Rhode Island	58
Washington	84*
Seton Hall	73

Naismith Championship; November 18
4	Ohio State	77
Washington	66
Consolation; November 18
Rhode Island	55
Seton Hall	60

==== Springfield Division ====
Springfield Semifinals; November 17
Norfolk State	49
Loyola (MD)	65
UMKC	59
Albany	62

Springfield Championship; November 18
Loyola (MD)	67
Albany	64
Consolation; November 18
Norfolk State	57
UMKC	63

=== 2013 ===
==== Naismith Division ====
Naismith Semifinals; November 23
24	North Carolina	82
Richmond	72
3	Louisville	71
Fairfield	57

Naismith Championship; November 24
24	North Carolina	93
3	Louisville	84
Consolation; November 24
Richmond	68
Fairfield	47

==== Springfield Division ====
Springfield Semifinals; November 23
Hofstra	81
Hartford	78
Belmont	81
Holy Cross	70

Springfield Championship; November 24
Hofstra	75
Belmont	85
Consolation; November 24
Hartford	55
Holy Cross	80

=== 2014 ===
==== Naismith Division ====
Naismith Semifinals; November 22
UMass	68
Notre Dame	81
Providence	80
Florida State	54

Naismith Championship; November 23
Notre Dame	74
Providence	75
Consolation; November 23
UMass	75
Florida State	69

==== Springfield Division ====
Springfield Semifinals; November 22
Manhattan	78
Binghamton	63
Navy	44
Northeastern	68

Springfield Championship; November 23
Manhattan	51
Northeastern	65
Consolation; November 23
Binghamton	68
Navy	70

=== 2015 ===
==== Naismith Bracket ====
Naismith Semifinals; November 21
Florida	74
Saint Joseph's	63
Old Dominion	39
21	Purdue	61

Naismith Championship; November 22
Florida	70
21	Purdue	85
Naismith Consolation; November 22
Saint Joseph's	66
Old Dominion	64

==== Springfield Bracket ====
Springfield Semifinals; November 21
Buffalo	86
North Carolina A&T	68
Vermont	85
Niagara	67

Springfield Championship; November 22
Buffalo	77
Vermont	71
Springfield Consolation; November 22
North Carolina A&T	72
Niagara	73

=== 2016 ===
==== Naismith Bracket ====
Naismith Semifinals; November 19
1	Duke	78
Penn State	68
24	Cincinnati	71
21	Rhode Island	76

Naismith Championship; November 20; ESPN
1	Duke	75
21	Rhode Island	65
Naismith Consolation; November 20; ESPN2
Penn State	50
24	Cincinnati	71

==== Springfield Bracket ====
Springfield Semifinals; November 19
Marist	87
Brown	79
Grand Canyon	82
Albany	77

Springfield Championship; November 20
Marist	72
Grand Canyon	84
Springfield Consolation; November 20
Albany	80
Brown	76

=== 2017 ===
==== Naismith Bracket ====
Naismith Semifinals; November 18; ESPN3
Texas Tech	75
Boston College	64
La Salle	74
20	Northwestern	82

Naismith Championship; November 19; ESPN2
Texas Tech	85
20	Northwestern	49
Naismith Consolation; November 19; ESPN2
Boston College	82
La Salle	61

==== Springfield Bracket ====
Springfield Semifinals; November 18; ESPN3
Sacred Heart	61
Saint Peters	70
South Alabama	68
Maine	46

Springfield Championship; November 19; ESPN3
Saint Peters	49
South Alabama	54
Springfield Consolation; November 19; ESPN3
Sacred Heart	69
Maine	68

=== 2018 ===
==== Naismith Bracket ====
Naismith Semifinals; November 17
18	Michigan	84
George Washington	61
South Carolina	67
Providence	76

Naismith Championship; November 18
18	Michigan	66
Providence	47
Naismith Consolation; November 18
George Washington	55
South Carolina	90

==== Springfield Bracket ====
Springfield Semifinals; November 16
Stony Brook	70
Holy Cross	84
Norfolk State	58
Siena	61

Springfield Championship; November 18
Holy Cross	57
Siena	45
Springfield Consolation; November 17
Stony Brook	72
Norfolk State	65

=== 2019 ===
==== Naismith Bracket ====
Naismith Semifinals; November 23
7	Virginia	58
UMass	46
Arizona State	80
St. John's	67

Naismith Championship; November 24
7	Virginia	48
Arizona State	45
Naismith Consolation; November 24
UMass	63
St. John’s	78

==== Springfield Bracket ====
Springfield Semifinals; November 23
Vermont	81
Central Connecticut	49
Rider	87
Columbia	63

Springfield Championship; November 24
Rider	72
Vermont	67
Springfield Consolation; November 24
Columbia	82
Central Connecticut	52

=== 2021 ===
Semifinals; November 20; ESPNEWS
5	Villanova	71
17	Tennessee	53
18	North Carolina	84
6	Purdue	93

Championship; November 21; ABC
5	Villanova	74
6	Purdue	80
Consolation; November 21; ESPN
17	Tennessee	89
18	North Carolina	72

=== 2022 ===
Semifinals; November 19; ESPNEWS
Saint Louis	67
Maryland	95
Miami (FL)	74
Providence	64

Championship; November 20; ESPN
Miami (FL)	70
Maryland	88
Consolation; November 20; ESPNU
Providence	73
Saint Louis	76

=== 2023 ===
Semifinals; November 18; ESPN+
Mississippi State	76
Washington State	64
Rhode Island	61
Northwestern	72

Championship; November 19; ESPN2
Mississippi State	66
Northwestern	57
Consolation; November 20; ESPNU
Washington State	78
Rhode Island	57

=== 2024 ===
The 2024 Hall of Fame Tip-Off was a Showcase Format round-robin tournament with predetermined opponents

Friday, November 22; ESPN+
Florida State	78
Temple	69

Saturday, November 23; ESPN+
Vermont	75
Delaware	71

Saturday, November 23; ESPN+
Yale	91
Fairfield	66

Saturday, November 23; ESPN+
Temple	87
UMass	80

Sunday, November 24; ESPN+
Vermont	66
Fairfield	67

Sunday, November 24; ESPN2
Yale	94
Delaware	100

Sunday, November 24; ESPNU
UMass	59
Florida State	92

=== 2025 ===
The 2025 Hall of Fame Tip-Off was a Showcase doubleheader.

Saturday, November 8 Peacock
George Washington	99
South Florida	95

Saturday, November 8 Peacock
Virginia Tech	107^{OT}
Providence	101

=== 2026 ===
The 2026 Hall of Fame Tip-Off will be a Showcase doubleheader.

Saturday, November 7 FS1
Rhode Island	84
Monmouth	66

Saturday, November 7 FS1
Nebraska	67
Providence	58
