= 2014–15 Florida State Seminoles men's basketball team =

American college basketball season

2014–15 Florida State Seminoles men's basketball
- Conference: Atlantic Coast Conference
- Record: 17–16 (8–10 ACC)
- Head coach: Leonard Hamilton (13th year)
- Assistant coaches: Stan Jones (13th year); Dennis Gates (4th year); Charlton Young (2nd year)
- Home arena: Donald L. Tucker Center (Capacity: 12,100)

2014–15 ACC men's basketball standings
	Conf.				Overall
Team	W		L	PCT	W		L	PCT
No. 6 Virginia	16	–	2	.889	30	–	4	.882
No. 4 Duke	15	–	3	.833	35	–	4	.897
No. 8 Notre Dame †	14	–	4	.778	32	–	6	.842
No. 15 North Carolina	11	–	7	.611	26	–	12	.684
Miami (FL)	10	–	8	.556	25	–	13	.658
NC State	10	–	8	.556	22	–	14	.611
Syracuse	9	–	9	.500	18	–	13	.581
Clemson	8	–	10	.444	16	–	15	.516
Florida State	8	–	10	.444	17	–	16	.515
Pittsburgh	8	–	10	.444	19	–	15	.559
Wake Forest	5	–	13	.278	13	–	19	.406
Boston College	4	–	14	.222	13	–	19	.406
Georgia Tech	3	–	15	.167	12	–	19	.387
Virginia Tech	2	–	16	.111	11	–	22	.333
No. 17 Louisville*	0	–	6	.000	0	–	8	.000
† ACC tournament winner Rankings from AP poll *Louisville: 24 reg. season games, 4 postseason games vacated due to sanctions against the program; Disputed Record-(27-9)(12-6)

The 2014–15 Florida State Seminoles men's basketball team, variously Florida State or FSU, represented Florida State University during the 2014–15 NCAA Division I men's basketball season. Florida State competed in Division I of the National Collegiate Athletic Association (NCAA). The Seminoles were led by thirteenth year head coach Leonard Hamilton and played their home games at the Donald L. Tucker Center on the university's Tallahassee, Florida campus. They were members of the Atlantic Coast Conference.

Florida State finished the season 17–16, 8–10 in ACC play, to finish in a tie for tenth place. They lost in the quarterfinals of the ACC Tournament to Virginia. The Seminoles missed the postseason for the first time in nine years.

== Previous season ==
The Seminoles finished the 2013–14 season 22–14, 9–9 in ACC play in a tie for seventh place. They lost in the quarterfinals of the ACC tournament to Virginia. They were invited to the NIT where they lost in the semifinals to Minnesota.

== Pre-season ==
=== Departures ===
Name	Number	Pos.	Height	Weight	Year	Hometown	Notes
Okaro White	10	F	6'9"	204	Senior	Clearwater, FL	Graduated
Robert Gilchrist	14	C	6'9"	220	Senior	London, England	Graduated
Ian Miller	30	G	6'3"	186	Senior	Charlotte, NC	Graduated
Joell Hopkins	35	F	6'6"	205	Senior	Durham, NC	Graduated

=== Transfers ===
Name	Number	Pos.	Height	Weight	Year	Hometown	Previous School
Dayshawn Watkins		G	6'0"	175	Sophomore	North Little Rock, AR	Junior college transfer from Holmes Community College.
Kedar Edwards		G	6'5"	185	Sophomore	Brooklyn, NY	Junior college transfer from State Fair Community College.

=== Recruiting class ===
College recruiting information
Name	Hometown	School	Height	Weight	Commit date
Phil Cofer; PF	Atlanta, GA	Whitewater High School	6 ft 7 in (2.01 m)	196 lb (89 kg)	May 10, 2014
Phil Cofer; PF	Recruit ratings: Scout: Rivals: 247Sports: ESPN:				
Robbie Berwick; SG	Atascadero, CA	Atascadero High School	6 ft 4 in (1.93 m)	185 lb (84 kg)	Nov 2, 2013
Robbie Berwick; SG	Recruit ratings: Scout: Rivals: 247Sports: ESPN:				
Norbertas Giga; C	Newark, NJ	Saint Benedict's Prep	6 ft 10 in (2.08 m)	230 lb (100 kg)	Nov 20, 2013
Norbertas Giga; C	Recruit ratings: Scout: Rivals: 247Sports: ESPN:				
Overall recruit ranking: Scout: N/A Rivals: N/A ESPN: N/A
Note: In many cases, Scout, Rivals, 247Sports, On3, and ESPN may conflict in their listings of height and weight.; In these cases, the average was taken. ESPN grades are on a 100-point scale.; Sources: "2014 Team Ranking". Rivals.

=== Media poll ===
In the ACC Media Poll, Florida State was picked to finish eighth in the conference.

== Roster ==
2014–15 Florida State Seminoles men's basketball team
Players
Coaches

Pos.	#	Name	Height	Weight	Year	Previous school	Hometown
F	0	Phil Cofer	6 ft 8 in (2.03 m)	205 lb (93 kg)	Fr	Whitewater HS	Atlanta, GA
G	1	Devon Bookert	6 ft 3 in (1.91 m)	185 lb (84 kg)	Jr	West Anchorage HS	Anchorage, AK
G	4	Dayshawn Watkins	6 ft 0 in (1.83 m)	180 lb (82 kg)	So	Holmes CC	North Little Rock, AR
F	5	Jarquez Smith	6 ft 9 in (2.06 m)	225 lb (102 kg)	So	Jones County High School	Haddock, GA
C	11	Kiel Turpin	7 ft 0 in (2.13 m)	240 lb (109 kg)	GS	Lincoln College	Normal, IL
C	15	Boris Bojanovsky	7 ft 3 in (2.21 m)	240 lb (109 kg)	Jr	Oakley College	Bratislava, Slovakia
G	22	Xavier Rathan-Mayes	6 ft 4 in (1.93 m)	180 lb (82 kg)	RS Fr	Huntington (WV) Prep	Scarborough, ON
G	24	Robbie Berwick	6 ft 4 in (1.93 m)	188 lb (85 kg)	Fr	Atascadero HS	Atascadero, CA
G	25	Aaron Thomas	6 ft 5 in (1.96 m)	195 lb (88 kg)	So	Brewster Academy	Cincinnati, OH
G	31	Michael Saxton	6 ft 5 in (1.96 m)	210 lb (95 kg)	Jr	Tallahassee CC; Lake Highland Prep	Orlando, FL
G	32	Montay Brandon	6 ft 7 in (2.01 m)	216 lb (98 kg)	Jr	Wesleyan Christian Acad.	Greensboro, NC
F	40	Brandon Allen (W)	6 ft 6 in (1.98 m)	200 lb (91 kg)	So	Milton HS	Milton, FL
C	50	Michael Ojo	7 ft 1 in (2.16 m)	292 lb (132 kg)	Jr	Tennessee Temple Acad.	Lagos, Nigeria

Head coach

- Leonard Hamilton (UT Martin)

Assistant coach(es)

- Stan Jones (Memphis)
- Dennis Gates (California)
- Charlton Young (Georgia Southern)

Legend

- (C) Team captain
- (S) Suspended
- (I) Ineligible
- (W) Walk-on
- Injured
- Current redshirt

Roster

=== Depth chart ===
Aaron Thomas, a starting guard, was declared by the university to be ineligible for the season.

Pos.	Starting 5	Bench 1	Bench 2
C	Michael Ojo	Kiel Turpin	Boris Bojanovsky
PF	Phil Cofer	Jarquez Smith
SF	Xavier Rathan-Mayes
SG	Devon Bookert	Dayshawn Watkins
PG	Montay Brandon	Robbie Berwick	Dayshawn Watkins

== Honors ==
- ACC Rookie of the Week
  - Xavier Rathan-Mayes

=== All-ACC ===
- Honorable Mention
  - Xavier Rathan-Mayes
- Freshman Team
  - Xavier Rathan-Mayes

=== All-Americans ===
- Freshman Team
  - Xavier Rathan-Mayes

== Awards ==
- Kyle Macy Award Finalist

Xavier Rathan-Mayes

== Schedule ==
Date time, TV	Opponent	Result	Record	High points	High rebounds	High assists	Site (attendance) city, state
Exhibition
November 3*; 7:00 p.m.	Embry Riddle	W 95–73	0–0	18 – Thomas	8 – Turpin	5 – Rathan-Mayes	Donald L. Tucker Center; Tallahassee, FL
November 10*; 7:00 p.m.	Belmont Abby	W 99–45	0–0	16 – Thomas	6 – Tied	5 – Bookert	Donald L. Tucker Center; Tallahassee, FL
Regular season
November 15*; 1:00 p.m., ESPN3	Manhattan; Hall of Fame Tip Off	W 81–66	1–0	14 – Thomas	6 – Tied	5 – Bookert	Donald L. Tucker Center (6,271); Tallahassee, FL
November 18*; 7:00 p.m., ESPN3	Northeastern; Hall of Fame Tip Off	L 73–76	1–1	24 – Thomas	7 – Brandon	6 – Bookert	Donald L. Tucker Center (5,587); Tallahassee, FL
November 22*; 2:30 p.m., ESPN3	vs. Providence; Hall of Fame Tip Off	L 54–80	1–2	16 – Thomas	7 – Brandon	5 – Rathan-Mayes	Mohegan Sun Arena (6,513); Uncasville, CT
November 23*; 12:00 p.m., ESPNU	vs. UMass; Hall of Fame Tip Off	L 69–75	1–3	22 – Rathan-Mayes	12 – Cofer	3 – Rathan-Mayes	Mohegan Sun Arena (6,513); Uncasville, CT
November 25*; 7:00 p.m., ESPN3	The Citadel	W 66–55	2–3	26 – Rathan-Mayes	8 – Brandon	3 – Tied	Donald L. Tucker Center (5,137); Tallahassee, FL
November 28*; 6:00 p.m., ESPN3	Charleston Southern	W 58–47	3–3	16 – Rathan-Mayes	8 – Watkins	4 – Rathan-Mayes	Donald L. Tucker Center (5,660); Tallahassee, FL
December 1*; 7:00 p.m., ESPN2	Nebraska; ACC–Big Ten Challenge	L 65–70	3–4	17 – Rathan-Mayes	10 – Bojanovsky	6 – Rathan-Mayes	Donald L. Tucker Center (6,406); Tallahassee, FL
December 6*; 2:00 p.m., ESPN3	UCF	W 96–73	4–4	23 – Brandon	6 – Brandon	6 – Watkins	Donald L. Tucker Center (5,732); Tallahassee, FL
December 13; 8:00 p.m., ESPN2	at No. 25 Notre Dame	L 63–83	4–5 (0–1)	14 – Brandon	10 – Bojanovsky	3 – Tied	Edmund P. Joyce Center (7,691); South Bend, IN
December 17*; 7:00 p.m., RSN	North Florida	W 93–77	5–5	24 – Brandon	8 – Cofer	9 – Rathan-Mayes	Donald L. Tucker Center (4,969); Tallahassee, FL
December 20*; 2:00 p.m., FSN	vs. South Florida; Orange Bowl Basketball Classic	W 75–62	6–5	24 – Bookert	5 – Cofer	9 – Rathan-Mayes	BB&T Center (10,175); Sunrise, FL
December 22*; 2:00 p.m., ESPN3	Stetson	W 63–59	7–5	17 – Brandon	8 – Cofer	7 – Rathan-Mayes	Donald L. Tucker Center (4,743); Tallahassee, FL
December 30*; 7:00 p.m., ESPN2	Florida; Rivalry	W 65–63	8–5	17 – Brandon	8 – Smith	3 – Tied	Donald L. Tucker Center (8,273); Tallahassee, FL
January 2*; 9:00 p.m., ESPNU	at Mississippi State	L 55–62	8–6	16 – Bookert	6 – Rathan-Mayes	4 – Rathan-Mayes	Humphrey Coliseum (5,756); Starkville, MS
January 6; 7:00 p.m., RSN	Virginia Tech	W 86–75	9–6 (1–1)	22 – Rathan-Mayes	8 – Brandon	3 – Rathan-Mayes	Donald L. Tucker Center (6,353); Tallahassee, FL
January 11; 8:00 p.m., ESPNU	at Syracuse	L 57–70	9–7 (1–2)	14 – Rathan-Mayes	7 – Brandon	5 – Bookert	Carrier Dome (24,257); Syracuse, NY
January 14; 9:00 p.m., RSN	at Pittsburgh	L 64–73	9–8 (1–3)	21 – Cofer	11 – Cofer	3 – Tied	Peterson Events Center (10,989); Pittsburgh, PA
January 17; 1:30 p.m., ACCN	NC State	L 63–72	9–9 (1–4)	20 – Brandon	9 – Brandon	5 – Rathan-Mayes	Donald L. Tucker Center (8,675); Tallahassee, FL
January 19; 9:00 p.m., ESPNU	at Clemson	W 59–55	10–9 (2–4)	17 – Rathan-Mayes	5 – Rathan-Mayes	9 – Rathan-Mayes	Littlejohn Coliseum (6,993); Clemson, SC
January 24; 2:00 p.m., ESPN	at No. 15 North Carolina	L 74–78	10–10 (2–5)	35 – Rathan-Mayes	7 – Bookert	4 – Rathan-Mayes	Dean E. Smith Center (20,512); Chapel Hill, NC
January 28; 7:00 p.m., RSN	Wake Forest	W 82–76 ^{2OT}	11–10 (3–5)	21 – Rathan-Mayes	8 – Cofer	5 – Rathan-Mayes	Donald L. Tucker Center (6,195); Tallahassee, FL
February 1; 12:30 p.m., ESPNU	No. 23 Miami (FL)	W 55–54	12–10 (4–5)	18 – Brandon	6 – Tied	4 – Bookert	Donald L. Tucker Center (7,282); Tallahassee, FL
February 4; 9:00 p.m., RSN	Clemson	L 56–62	12–11 (4–6)	15 – Rathan-Mayes	10 – Bojanovsky	3 – Brandon	Donald L. Tucker Center (6,362); Tallahassee, FL
February 7; 3:00 p.m., RSN	at Virginia Tech	W 73–65	13–11 (5–6)	16 – Brandon	6 – Brandon	11 – Rathan-Mayes	Cassell Coliseum (7,819); Blacksburg, VA
February 9; 7:00 p.m., ESPN	No. 4 Duke; Big Monday	L 70–73	13–12 (5–7)	23 – Bookert	9 – Ojo	6 – Bookert	Donald L. Tucker Center (11,498); Tallahassee, FL
February 14; 2:30 p.m., ACCN	at Georgia Tech	W 57–53	14–12 (6–7)	20 – Rathan-Mayes	8 – Brandon	6 – Bookert	Hank McCamish Pavilion (6,317); Atlanta, GA
February 18; 9:00 p.m., ACCN	Boston College	W 69–60	15–12 (7–7)	18 – Bookert	8 – Tied	5 – Rathan-Mayes	Donald L. Tucker Center (6,387); Tallahassee, FL
February 22; 6:30 p.m., ESPNU	at No. 2 Virginia	L 41–51	15–13 (7–8)	13 – Rathan-Mayes	8 – Brandon	3 – Bookert	John Paul Jones Arena (14,076); Charlottesville, VA
February 25; 9:00 p.m., RSN	at Miami (FL)	L 77–81	15–14 (7–9)	35 – Rathan-Mayes	5 – Brandon	5 – Rathan-Mayes	BankUnited Center (5,857); Coral Gables, FL
February 28; 12:00 p.m., ESPN2	No. 17 Louisville	L 59–81	15–15 (7–10)	13 – Brandon	9 – Bojanovsky	2 – Tied	Donald L. Tucker Center (8,844); Tallahassee, FL
March 7; 12:00 p.m., ESPN2	Pittsburgh	W 61–52	16–15 (8–10)	19 – Rathan-Mayes	6 – Tied	5 – Rathan-Mayes	Donald L. Tucker Center (6,276); Tallahassee, FL
ACC tournament
March 11; 12:00 p.m., ESPN/ACCN	vs. (8) Clemson; Second round	W 76–73	17–15	30 – Rathan-Mayes	7 – Cofer	3 – Tied	Greensboro Coliseum (22,026); Greensboro, NC
March 12; 12:00 p.m., ESPN/ACCN	vs. No. 3 (1) Virginia; Quarterfinals	L 44–58	17–16	13 – Rathan-Mayes	8 – Brandon	3 – Rathan-Mayes	Greensboro Coliseum (22,026); Greensboro, NC
*Non-conference game. ^{#}Rankings from AP Poll. (#) Tournament seedings in parentheses. All times are in Eastern Time.

== Media ==
Florida State basketball is broadcast on the Florida State University Seminoles Radio Network.
