= 2014–15 Virginia Tech Hokies men's basketball team =

American college basketball season

2014–15 Virginia Tech Hokies men's basketball
- Conference: Atlantic Coast Conference
- Record: 11–22 (2–16 ACC)
- Head coach: Buzz Williams (1st season)
- Assistant coaches: Isaac Chew; Steve Roccaforte; Jamie McNeilly
- Home arena: Cassell Coliseum

2014–15 ACC men's basketball standings
	Conf.				Overall
Team	W		L	PCT	W		L	PCT
No. 6 Virginia	16	–	2	.889	30	–	4	.882
No. 4 Duke	15	–	3	.833	35	–	4	.897
No. 8 Notre Dame †	14	–	4	.778	32	–	6	.842
No. 15 North Carolina	11	–	7	.611	26	–	12	.684
Miami (FL)	10	–	8	.556	25	–	13	.658
NC State	10	–	8	.556	22	–	14	.611
Syracuse	9	–	9	.500	18	–	13	.581
Clemson	8	–	10	.444	16	–	15	.516
Florida State	8	–	10	.444	17	–	16	.515
Pittsburgh	8	–	10	.444	19	–	15	.559
Wake Forest	5	–	13	.278	13	–	19	.406
Boston College	4	–	14	.222	13	–	19	.406
Georgia Tech	3	–	15	.167	12	–	19	.387
Virginia Tech	2	–	16	.111	11	–	22	.333
No. 17 Louisville*	0	–	6	.000	0	–	8	.000
† ACC tournament winner Rankings from AP poll *Louisville: 24 reg. season games, 4 postseason games vacated due to sanctions against the program; Disputed Record-(27-9)(12-6)

The 2014–15 Virginia Tech Hokies men's basketball team represented Virginia Polytechnic Institute and State University during the 2014–15 NCAA Division I men's basketball season. They were led by first year head coach Buzz Williams and played their home games at Cassell Coliseum. They were a member of the Atlantic Coast Conference. They finished the season 11–21, 2–16 in ACC play to finish in last place. They advanced to the second round of the ACC tournament where they lost to Miami (FL).

== Last season ==
The Hokies finished the season 11–22, 2–16 in ACC play to finish in last place. After defeating Wake Forest in the first round, they lost in the second round of the ACC tournament to Miami (FL).

== Departures ==
Name	Number	Pos.	Height	Weight	Year	Hometown	Notes
Cadarian Raines	4	F	6'9"	238	RS Senior	Petersburg, VA	Graduated
Marquis Rankin	10	G	6'1"	185	Junior	Charlotte, NC	Transferred
Ben Emelogu	15	G	6'5"	205	Freshman	Grand Prairie, TX	Transferred to SMU
Maurice Kirby	21	F	6'9"	235	Freshman	Chandler, AZ	Transferred to Coffeyville Community College
Jarell Eddie	31	F	6'7"	220	Senior	Charlotte, NC	Graduated
Trevor Thompson	32	F	6'11"	210	Freshman	Indianapolis, IN	Transferred to Ohio State
Marshall Wood	33	F	6'8"	230	Sophomore	Rustburg, VA	Transferred to Richmond
C. J. Barksdale	42	F	6'9"	235	Junior	Danville, VA	Quit

=== Incoming transfers ===
Name	Number	Pos.	Height	Weight	Year	Hometown	Previous School
Shane Henry	0	F	6'8"	180	Junior	Brooklyn, NY	Junior College transfer Georgia Perimeter College
Seth Allen	4	G	6'1"	190	Junior	Woodbridge, VA	Transferred from Maryland. Under NCAA transfer rules, Allen will have to redshirt for the 2014–15 season. Will have two years of eligibility remaining.
Zach LeDay	32	F	6'7"	245	Junior	The Colony, TX	Transferred from South Florida. Under NCAA transfer rules, LeDay will have to redshirt for the 2014–15 season. Will have two years of eligibility remaining.

== Recruiting class ==
College recruiting information
Name	Hometown	School	Height	Weight	Commit date
Ahmed Hill; SG	Augusta, GA	Aquinas	6 ft 5 in (1.96 m)	190 lb (86 kg)	Apr 19, 2014
Ahmed Hill; SG	Recruit ratings: Scout: Rivals: 247Sports: ESPN:				
Justin Bibbs; SG	Chandler, AZ	Montverde Academy	6 ft 5 in (1.96 m)	205 lb (93 kg)	Sep 10, 2013
Justin Bibbs; SG	Recruit ratings: Scout: Rivals: 247Sports: ESPN:				
Jalen Hudson; SG	Akron, OH	St. Vincent-St. Mary	6 ft 4 in (1.93 m)	185 lb (84 kg)	Oct 4, 2013
Jalen Hudson; SG	Recruit ratings: Scout: Rivals: 247Sports: ESPN:				
Satchel Pierce; C	Indianapolis, IN	St. Johns NW Military Academy	7 ft 0 in (2.13 m)	250 lb (110 kg)	Apr 19, 2014
Satchel Pierce; C	Recruit ratings: Scout: Rivals: 247Sports: ESPN:				
Overall recruit ranking: Scout: NA Rivals: NA 247Sports: 23 ESPN: 19
Note: In many cases, Scout, Rivals, 247Sports, On3, and ESPN may conflict in their listings of height and weight.; In these cases, the average was taken. ESPN grades are on a 100-point scale.; Sources: "Virginia Tech Commit List for 2014". Rivals.; "2014 Virginia Tech Basketball Commits". Scout.; "ESPN". ESPN.; "Scout.com Team Recruiting Rankings". Scout.; "2014 Team Ranking". Rivals.

== Roster ==
2014–15 Virginia Tech Hokies men's basketball team
Players
Coaches

Pos.	#	Name	Height	Weight	Year	Previous school	Hometown
F	0	Shane Henry	6 ft 8 in (2.03 m)	190 lb (86 kg)	Jr	Newton/Georgia Perimeter College	Newton, Georgia
G	1	Malik Müller	6 ft 3 in (1.91 m)	220 lb (100 kg)	RS Fr	Urspring	Ehingen, Germany
F	2	Joey van Zegeren	6 ft 10 in (2.08 m)	235 lb (107 kg)	RS Jr	Canarias Basketball Academy	Hoogeveen, Netherlands
G	3	Adam Smith	6 ft 1 in (1.85 m)	170 lb (77 kg)	RS Jr	Fayette County/UNC Wilmington	Jonesboro, Georgia
G	4	Seth Allen (redshirt)	6 ft 1 in (1.85 m)	195 lb (88 kg)	Jr	Fredericksburg Christian/Maryland	Woodbridge, Virginia
G	10	Justin Bibbs	6 ft 5 in (1.96 m)	220 lb (100 kg)	Fr	Montverde Academy	Dayton, Ohio
G	11	Devin Wilson	6 ft 4 in (1.93 m)	190 lb (86 kg)	RS So	Montour	McKees Rocks, Pennsylvania
G	13	Ahmed Hill	6 ft 5 in (1.96 m)	195 lb (88 kg)	Fr	Aquinas	Augusta, Georgia
F	14	Greg Donlon	6 ft 8 in (2.03 m)	230 lb (104 kg)	Jr	Cosby	Midlothian, Virginia
F	21	Satchel Pierce	7 ft 0 in (2.13 m)	255 lb (116 kg)	Fr	The Kiski School	Barberton, Ohio
F	22	Christian Beyer	6 ft 7 in (2.01 m)	220 lb (100 kg)	Sr	New Bern	New Bern, North Carolina
G	23	Jalen Hudson	6 ft 5 in (1.96 m)	195 lb (88 kg)	Fr	St. Vincent–St. Mary	Akron, Ohio
G	25	Will Johnston	6 ft 4 in (1.93 m)	205 lb (93 kg)	Sr	Midlothian	Midlothian, Virginia
F	32	Zach LeDay (redshirt)	6 ft 7 in (2.01 m)	235 lb (107 kg)	Jr	The Colony/South Florida	Dallas, Texas

Head coach

- Buzz Williams (Oklahoma City)

Assistant coach(es)

- Isaac Chew (Avila)
- Steve Roccaforte (Lamar)
- Jamie McNeilly (New Orleans)

Legend

- (C) Team captain
- (S) Suspended
- (I) Ineligible
- (W) Walk-on
- Injured
- Current redshirt

Roster
Last update: 2014-09-05

== Schedule ==
Date time, TV	Rank^{#}	Opponent^{#}	Result	Record	Site (attendance) city, state
Regular season
11/14/2014*; 7:00 pm, ESPN3		Maryland Eastern Shore	W 71–46	1–0	Cassell Coliseum (6,191); Blacksburg, VA
11/19/2014*; 7:00 pm, ESPN3		Liberty; Cancún Challenge	W 73–63	2–0	Cassell Coliseum (5,586); Blacksburg, VA
11/22/2014*; 1:00 pm, ESPN3		Appalachian State	L 63–65	2–1	Cassell Coliseum (2,970); Blacksburg, VA
11/25/2014*; 7:00 pm, CBSSN		vs. Northern Iowa; Cancún Challenge semifinals	L 54–73	2–2	Hard Rock Hotel Riviera Maya (650); Cancún, MX
11/26/2014*; 7:00 pm, CBSSN		vs. Miami (OH); Cancún Challenge	W 78–63	3–2	Hard Rock Hotel Riviera Maya (650); Cancún, MX
11/30/2014*; 3:00 pm, ESPN3		Morgan State; Cancún Challenge	W 83–63	4–2	Cassell Coliseum (3996); Blacksburg, VA
12/03/2014*; 7:15 pm, ESPNU		at Penn State; ACC–Big Ten Challenge	L 58–61	4–3	Bryce Jordan Center (7,326); University Park, PA
12/07/2014*; 3:00 pm, ESPN3		Radford; Rivalry	L 66–68	4–4	Cassell Coliseum (5,394); Blacksburg, VA
12/14/2014*; 3:00 pm		Alabama A&M	W 65–55	5–4	Cassell Coliseum (3,559); Blacksburg, VA
12/20/2014*; 1:00 pm		The Citadel	W 64–61	6–4	Cassell Coliseum (3,454); Blacksburg, VA
12/22/2014*; 7:00 pm		VMI	W 87–74	7–4	Cassell Coliseum (5,326); Blacksburg, VA
12/27/2014*; 7:00 pm, ESPN3		Presbyterian	W 87–65	8–4	Cassell Coliseum (3,420); Blacksburg, VA
12/30/2014*; 2:00 pm, ESPNU		at No. 17 West Virginia	L 51–82	8–5	WVU Coliseum (13,330); Morgantown, WV
01/03/2015; 12:00 pm, RSN		Syracuse	L 66–68	8–6 (0–1)	Cassell Coliseum (6,838); Blacksburg, VA
01/06/2015; 7:00 pm, RSN		at Florida State	L 75–86	8–7 (0–2)	Donald L. Tucker Center (6,353); Tallahassee, FL
01/13/2015; 7:00 pm, RSN		at No. 6 Louisville	L 63–78	8–8 (0–3)	KFC Yum! Center (21,684); Louisville, KY
01/18/2015; 6:30 pm, ESPNU		at No. 15 North Carolina	L 53–68	8–9 (0–4)	Dean Smith Center (19,745); Chapel Hill, NC
01/22/2015; 7:00 pm, RSN		No. 8 Notre Dame	L 60–85	8–10 (0–5)	Cassell Coliseum (7,451); Blacksburg, VA
01/25/2015; 4:00 pm, ACCN		No. 2 Virginia; Rivalry	L 47–50	8–11 (0–6)	Cassell Coliseum (9,847); Blacksburg, VA
01/27/2015; 7:00 pm, ESPNU		Pittsburgh	W 70–67 ^{OT}	9–11 (1–6)	Cassell Coliseum (5,206); Blacksburg, VA
01/31/2015; 2:00 pm, RSN		at Wake Forest	L 70–73	9–12 (1–7)	LJVM Coliseum (11,752); Winston-Salem, NC
02/03/2015; 9:00 pm, ESPNU		at Syracuse	L 70–72	9–13 (1–8)	Carrier Dome (22,928); Syracuse, NY
02/07/2015; 3:00 pm, ACCN		Florida State	L 65–73	9–14 (1–9)	Cassell Coliseum (7,819); Blacksburg, VA
02/09/2015; 9:00 pm, ESPNU		Georgia Tech	W 65–63	10–14 (2–9)	Cassell Coliseum (5,346); Blacksburg, VA
02/14/2015; 12:00 pm, RSN		at Clemson	L 54–75	10–15 (2–10)	Littlejohn Coliseum (8,645); Clemson, SC
02/18/2015; 7:00 pm, RSN		at Miami (FL)	L 52–76	10–16 (2–11)	BankUnited Center (5,007); Coral Gables, FL
02/21/2015; 6:00 pm, ESPN2		at NC State	L 53–69	10–17 (2–12)	PNC Arena (19,500); Raleigh, NC
02/25/2015; 9:00 pm, ESPN2		No. 4 Duke	L 86–91 ^{OT}	10–18 (2–13)	Cassell Coliseum (5,346); Blacksburg, VA
02/28/2015; 4:00 pm, ACCN		at No. 2 Virginia; Rivalry	L 57–69	10–19 (2–14)	John Paul Jones Arena (14,245); Charlottesville, VA
03/02/2015; 9:00 pm, ESPNU		Boston College	L 59–66	10–20 (2–15)	Cassell Coliseum (5,730); Blacksburg, VA
03/07/2015; 12:00 pm, RSN		Miami (FL)	L 61–82	10–21 (2–16)	Cassell Coliseum (5,421); Blacksburg, VA
ACC tournament
03/10/2015; 3:40 pm, ESPN2		vs. Wake Forest; First Round	W 81–80	11–21	Greensboro Coliseum (9,003); Greensboro, NC
03/11/2015; 9:00 pm, ESPN2		vs. Miami (FL); Second Round	L 49–59	11–22	Greensboro Coliseum; Greensboro, NC
*Non-conference game. ^{#}Rankings from AP Poll. (#) Tournament seedings in parentheses. All times are in Eastern Time.
