= 2014–15 NC State Wolfpack men's basketball team =

American college basketball season

2014–15 NC State Wolfpack men's basketball

NCAA tournament, Sweet Sixteen
- Conference: Atlantic Coast Conference

Ranking
- Coaches: No. 24
- Record: 22–14 (10–8 ACC)
- Head coach: Mark Gottfried (4th season)
- Assistant coaches: Orlando Early; Bobby Lutz; Rob Moxley
- Home arena: PNC Arena

2014–15 ACC men's basketball standings
| | Conf. | | | | Overall |
| Team | W | | L | PCT | W | | L | PCT |
|---|---|---|---|---|---|---|---|---|
| No. 6 Virginia | 16 | – | 2 | .889 | 30 | – | 4 | .882 |
| No. 4 Duke | 15 | – | 3 | .833 | 35 | – | 4 | .897 |
| No. 8 Notre Dame † | 14 | – | 4 | .778 | 32 | – | 6 | .842 |
| No. 15 North Carolina | 11 | – | 7 | .611 | 26 | – | 12 | .684 |
| Miami (FL) | 10 | – | 8 | .556 | 25 | – | 13 | .658 |
| NC State | 10 | – | 8 | .556 | 22 | – | 14 | .611 |
| Syracuse | 9 | – | 9 | .500 | 18 | – | 13 | .581 |
| Clemson | 8 | – | 10 | .444 | 16 | – | 15 | .516 |
| Florida State | 8 | – | 10 | .444 | 17 | – | 16 | .515 |
| Pittsburgh | 8 | – | 10 | .444 | 19 | – | 15 | .559 |
| Wake Forest | 5 | – | 13 | .278 | 13 | – | 19 | .406 |
| Boston College | 4 | – | 14 | .222 | 13 | – | 19 | .406 |
| Georgia Tech | 3 | – | 15 | .167 | 12 | – | 19 | .387 |
| Virginia Tech | 2 | – | 16 | .111 | 11 | – | 22 | .333 |
| No. 17 Louisville* | 0 | – | 6 | .000 | 0 | – | 8 | .000 |
† ACC tournament winner Rankings from AP poll *Louisville: 24 reg. season games, 4 postseason games vacated due to sanctions against the program; Disputed Record-(27-9)(12-6)

The 2014–15 NC State Wolfpack men's basketball team represented North Carolina State University during the 2014–15 NCAA Division I men's basketball season. The Wolfpack, led by fourth-year head coach Mark Gottfried, played their home games at PNC Arena and were members of the Atlantic Coast Conference. They finished the season 22–14, 10–8 in ACC play to finish in a tie for sixth place. They advanced to the quarterfinals of the ACC tournament, where they lost to Duke. They received an at-large bid to the NCAA tournament, where they defeated LSU in the second round and Villanova in the third round to advance to the Sweet Sixteen, where they lost to fellow ACC member Louisville.

== Previous season ==
The Wolfpack finished the previous season with a record of 22–14, 9–9 in ACC play, to finish in a three-way tie for seventh place. They advanced to the semifinals of the ACC tournament, where they lost to Duke. They received an at-large bid to the NCAA tournament, where they defeated Xavier in the First Four before losing in the second round to Saint Louis.

== Off season ==
=== Departures ===
| Name | Number | Pos. | Height | Weight | Year | Hometown | Notes |
|---|---|---|---|---|---|---|---|
| Tyler Lewis | 12 | G | 5'11" | 170 | Sophomore | Statesville, North Carolina | Transferred to Butler |
| Jordan Vandenberg | 14 | C | 7'1" | 245 | Senior | Melbourne, Australia | Graduated, free agent in NBA |
| T. J. Warren | 24 | F | 6'8" | 215 | Sophomore | Durham, North Carolina | Entered 2014 NBA draft. Selected by the Phoenix Suns in first round. |

=== Class of 2014 signees ===
College recruiting
| Name | Hometown | School | Height | Weight | Commit date |
|---|---|---|---|---|---|
| Abdul-Malik Abu; PF | Boston, MA | Kimball Union Academy | 6 ft 8 in (2.03 m) | 230 lb (100 kg) | Sep 7, 2013 |
| Abdul-Malik Abu; PF | Recruit ratings: Scout: Rivals: 247Sports: ESPN: | | | | |
| Caleb Martin; SF | Mocksville, NC | Oak Hill Academy | 6 ft 7 in (2.01 m) | 190 lb (86 kg) | Oct 10, 2012 |
| Caleb Martin; SF | Recruit ratings: Scout: Rivals: 247Sports: ESPN: | | | | |
| Cody Martin; SF | Mocksville, NC | Oak Hill Academy | 6 ft 7 in (2.01 m) | 205 lb (93 kg) | Oct 10, 2012 |
| Cody Martin; SF | Recruit ratings: Scout: Rivals: 247Sports: ESPN: | | | | |
Overall recruit ranking:
Note: In many cases, Scout, Rivals, 247Sports, On3, and ESPN may conflict in their listings of height and weight.; In these cases, the average was taken. ESPN grades are on a 100-point scale.; Sources: "2014 NC State Basketball Commits". Scout.; "ESPN". ESPN.; "Scout.com Team Recruiting Rankings". Scout.; "2014 Team Ranking". Rivals.

== Roster ==
2014–15 NC State Wolfpack men's basketball team
Players
Coaches

| Pos. | # | Name | Height | Weight | Year | Hometown |
|---|---|---|---|---|---|---|
| F | 0 | Abdul-Malik Abu | 6 ft 8 in (2.03 m) | 240 lb (109 kg) | Fr | Boston, Massachusetts |
| G | 1 | Trevor Lacey | 6 ft 4 in (1.93 m) | 210 lb (95 kg) | RS Jr | Huntsville, Alabama |
| G | 3 | Terry Henderson (redshirt) | 6 ft 4 in (1.93 m) | 200 lb (91 kg) | Jr | Raleigh, North Carolina |
| F | 4 | Chris Brickhouse (W) | 6 ft 5 in (1.96 m) | 205 lb (93 kg) | So | Raleigh, North Carolina |
| G | 5 | Desmond Lee | 6 ft 4 in (1.93 m) | 200 lb (91 kg) | Sr | Norfolk, Virginia |
| F | 10 | Lennard Freeman | 6 ft 8 in (2.03 m) | 245 lb (111 kg) | So | Washington, D.C. |
| G | 12 | Cat Barber | 6 ft 2 in (1.88 m) | 185 lb (84 kg) | So | Newport News, Virginia |
| G | 13 | Chris Corchiani, Jr. (W) | 6 ft 0 in (1.83 m) | 180 lb (82 kg) | Fr | Raleigh, North Carolina |
| F | 14 | Caleb Martin | 6 ft 6 in (1.98 m) | 200 lb (91 kg) | Fr | Mocksville, North Carolina |
| F | 15 | Cody Martin | 6 ft 6 in (1.98 m) | 205 lb (93 kg) | Fr | Mocksville, North Carolina |
| G | 20 | Patrick Wallace (W) | 6 ft 1 in (1.85 m) | 195 lb (88 kg) | So | Charlotte, North Carolina |
| F | 21 | BeeJay Anya | 6 ft 9 in (2.06 m) | 280 lb (127 kg) | So | Gaithersburg, Maryland |
| G | 22 | Ralston Turner | 6 ft 6 in (1.98 m) | 205 lb (93 kg) | RS Sr | Muscle Shoals, Alabama |
| G | 25 | Chase Cannon (W) | 6 ft 5 in (1.96 m) | 200 lb (91 kg) | Jr | Morehead City, North Carolina |
| G | 30 | Staats Battle | 6 ft 6 in (1.98 m) | 203 lb (92 kg) | Sr | Raleigh, North Carolina |
| F/C | 32 | Kyle Washington | 6 ft 9 in (2.06 m) | 230 lb (104 kg) | So | Champlin, Minnesota |

Head coach

- Mark Gottfried (Alabama)

Assistant coach(es)

- Orlando Early (Gardner–Webb)
- Bobby Lutz (Charlotte)
- Rob Moxley (Pfeiffer)

Legend

- (C) Team captain
- (S) Suspended
- (I) Ineligible
- (W) Walk-on
- Injured
- Current redshirt

Roster

== Schedule and results ==
| Date time, TV | Rank^{#} | Opponent^{#} | Result | Record | High points | High rebounds | High assists | Site (attendance) city, state |
Exhibition
| Nov 8* | | Queens | W 78–47 | | – | – | – | PNC Arena; Raleigh, NC |
Regular season
| Nov 14*; 7:00 pm | | Jackson State | W 93–58 | 1–0 | 25 – Barber | 9 – Washington | 6 – Barber | PNC Arena (11,158); Raleigh, NC |
| Nov 17*; 7:00 pm | | Hofstra | W 76–64 | 2–0 | 24 – Turner | 13 – Freeman | 6 – Barber | PNC Arena (14,634); Raleigh, NC |
| Nov 20*; 7:00 pm | | Jacksonville | W 79–43 | 3–0 | 15 – Caleb Martin | 9 – Freeman | 5 – Lacey | PNC Arena (14,438); Raleigh, NC |
| Nov 23*; 4:00 pm, ESPNU | | South Florida | W 68–65 | 4–0 | 21 – Lacey | 10 – Freeman | 4 – Lacey | PNC Arena (15,157); Raleigh, NC |
| Nov 26*; 7:00 pm | | Richmond | W 84–72 | 5–0 | 26 – Lacey | 9 – Freeman | 5 – Lacey | PNC Arena (14,520); Raleigh, NC |
| Nov 28*; 7:00 pm | | Boise State | W 60–54 | 6–0 | 14 – Tied | 6 – Tied | 4 – Tied | PNC Arena (15,439); Raleigh, NC |
| Dec 2*; 9:00 pm, ESPNU | | at Purdue; ACC–Big Ten Challenge | L 61–66 | 6–1 | 17 – Washington | 9 – Washington | 3 – Lacey | Mackey Arena (12,023); West Lafayette, IN |
| Dec 6; 7:30 pm, ESPNU | | Wake Forest; Tobacco Road | W 78–65 | 7–1 (1–0) | 21 – Turner | 11 – Freeman | 6 – Lacey | PNC Arena (16,615); Raleigh, NC |
| Dec 12*; 7:00 pm, ESPN3 | | Charleston Southern | W 86–50 | 8–1 | 17 – Tied | 8 – Freeman | 4 – Turner | Reynolds Coliseum (5,048); Raleigh, NC |
| Dec 14*; 4:00 pm | | Wofford | L 54–55 | 8–2 | 18 – Lacey | 8 – Anya | 4 – Lacey | Reynolds Coliseum (5,495); Raleigh, NC |
| Dec 17*; 7:00 pm, ESPN2 | | Tennessee | W 83–72 | 9–2 | 33 – Turner | 8 – Lacey | 8 – Barber | PNC Arena (15,281); Raleigh, NC |
| Dec 20*; 9:00 pm, ESPN2 | | vs. No. 22 West Virginia; Gotham Classic | L 69–83 | 9–3 | 24 – Lacey | 4 – Tied | 3 – Tied | Madison Square Garden (8,088); New York City, NY |
| Dec 23*; 7:00 pm, ESPN3 | | Louisiana Tech | W 73–65 | 10–3 | 20 – Lacey | 10 – Washington | 2 – Barber | PNC Arena (15,739); Raleigh, NC |
| Dec 30*; 4:30 pm, ESPNU | | Cincinnati | L 60–76 | 10–4 | 15 – Barber | 6 – Washington | 2 – Tied | PNC Arena (16,980); Raleigh, NC |
| Jan 3; 12:00 pm, ACCN | | Pittsburgh | W 68–50 | 11–4 (2–0) | 19 – Lacey | 9 – Freeman | 3 – Tied | PNC Arena (16,197); Raleigh, NC |
| Jan 7; 7:00 pm, ESPN2 | | at No. 3 Virginia | L 51–61 | 11–5 (2–1) | 14 – Turner | 10 – Washington | 4 – Barber | John Paul Jones Arena (12,929); Charlottesville, VA |
| Jan 11; 1:30 pm, CBS | | No. 2 Duke | W 87–75 | 12–5 (3–1) | 21 – Lacey | 8 – Abu | 5 – Co. Martin | PNC Arena (19,722); Raleigh, NC |
| Jan 14; 7:00 pm, ESPN2 | | No. 15 North Carolina; Carolina–State Game | L 79–81 | 12–6 (3–2) | 20 – Turner | 9 – Abu | 5 – Lacey | PNC Arena (19,500); Raleigh, NC |
| Jan 17; 1:30 pm, ACCN | | at Florida State | W 72–63 | 13–6 (4–2) | 17 – Lacey | 6 – Tied | 4 – Lacey | Donald L. Tucker Center (8,675); Tallahassee, FL |
| Jan 22; 8:00 pm, ACCN | | at Miami (FL) | L 60–65 | 13–7 (4–3) | 19 – Abu | 5 – 4 tied | 6 – Barber | BankUnited Center (6,556); Coral Gables, FL |
| Jan 25; 6:30 pm, ESPNU | | No. 8 Notre Dame | L 78–81 ^{OT} | 13–8 (4–4) | 13 – Lacey | 6 – 3 tied | 7 – Lacey | PNC Arena (19,500); Raleigh, NC |
| Jan 29; 9:00 pm, ACCN | | Clemson | L 57–68 | 13–9 (4–5) | 17 – Lacey | 12 – Abu | 5 – Lacey | PNC Arena (15,866); Raleigh, NC |
| Jan 31; 12:00 pm, ACCN | | at Georgia Tech | W 81–80 ^{OT} | 14–9 (5–5) | 23 – Barber | 6 – Lacey | 7 – Barber | McCamish Pavilion (6,384); Atlanta, GA |
| Feb 3; 8:00 pm, ACCN | | at Wake Forest | L 84–88 | 14–10 (5–6) | 28 – Barber | 8 – Tied | 4 – Barber | LJMV Coliseum (10,904); Winston-Salem, NC |
| Feb 11; 8:00 pm, ACCN | | No. 2 Virginia | L 47–51 | 14–11 (5–7) | 14 – Lacey | 9 – Caleb Martin | 2 – Tied | PNC Arena (19,500); Raleigh, NC |
| Feb 14; 4:00 pm, ESPN | | at No. 9 Louisville | W 74–65 | 15–11 (6–7) | 21 – Barber | 10 – Anya | 4 – Tied | KFC Yum! Center (22,410); Louisville, KY |
| Feb 21; 6:00 pm, ESPN2 | | Virginia Tech | W 69–53 | 16–11 (7–7) | 18 – Turner | 7 – Anya | 6 – Lacey | PNC Arena (19,500); Raleigh, NC |
| Feb 24; 8:00 pm, ACCN | | at No. 15 North Carolina; Carolina–State Game | W 58–46 | 17–11 (8–7) | 15 – Barber | 6 – 3 tied | 4 – Barber | Dean Smith Center (21,750); Chapel Hill, NC |
| Feb 28; 12:00 pm, RSN | | at Boston College | L 63–79 | 17–12 (8–8) | 14 – Washington | 7 – Washington | 6 – Barber | Conte Forum (4,165); Chestnut Hill, MA |
| Mar 3; 9:00 pm, RSN | | at Clemson | W 66–61 | 18–12 (9–8) | 23 – Turner | 10 – Abu | 3 – Lacey | Littlejohn Coliseum (8,828); Clemson, SC |
| Mar 7; 12:00 pm, CBS | | Syracuse | W 71–57 | 19–12 (10–8) | 19 – Tied | 8 – Abu | 6 – Barber | PNC Arena (18,659); Raleigh, NC |
ACC Tournament
| Mar 11; 7:00 pm, ACCN/ESPN2 | (7) | vs. (10) Pittsburgh; Second round | W 81–70 | 20–12 | 34 – Barber | 6 – 3 tied | 5 – Lacey | Greensboro Coliseum (22,026); Greensboro, NC |
| Mar 12; 7:00 pm, ACCN/ESPN | (7) | vs. (2) No. 2 Duke; Quarterfinals | L 53–77 | 20–13 | 16 – Turner | 6 – 3 tied | 4 – Barber | Greensboro Coliseum (22,026); Greensboro, NC |
NCAA tournament
| Mar 20*; 9:20 pm, TBS | (8 E) | vs. (9 E) LSU; Second round | W 66–65 | 21–13 | 17 – Barber | 9 – Lacey | 4 – Lacey | Consol Energy Center (16,170); Pittsburgh, PA |
| Mar 21*; 7:10 pm, TBS | (8 E) | vs. (1 E) No. 2 Villanova; Third round | W 71–68 | 22–13 | 17 – Lacey | 12 – Abu | 4 – Lacey | Consol Energy Center (18,762); Pittsburgh, PA |
| Mar 27; 7:37 pm, TBS | (8 E) | vs. (4 E) No. 17 Louisville; Sweet Sixteen | L 65–75 | 22–14 | 18 – Lacey | 6 – Abu | 3 – Tied | Carrier Dome (24,453); Syracuse, NY |
*Non-conference game. ^{#}Rankings from AP Poll. (#) Tournament seedings in parentheses. All times are in Eastern Time. (#) during NCAA Tournament is seed with Region E=East.
