= 2015 ACC men's basketball tournament =

Postseason college basketball tournament

- 2015 ACC Tournament logo
- Classification: Division I
- Season: 2014–15
- Teams: 14
- Site: Greensboro Coliseum; Greensboro, North Carolina
- Champions: Notre Dame (1st title)
- Winning coach: Mike Brey (1st title)
- MVP: Jerian Grant (Notre Dame)
- Attendance: 141,159
- Television: ESPN, ACCN

2014–15 ACC men's basketball standings
	Conf.				Overall
Team	W		L	PCT	W		L	PCT
No. 6 Virginia	16	–	2	.889	30	–	4	.882
No. 4 Duke	15	–	3	.833	35	–	4	.897
No. 8 Notre Dame †	14	–	4	.778	32	–	6	.842
No. 15 North Carolina	11	–	7	.611	26	–	12	.684
Miami (FL)	10	–	8	.556	25	–	13	.658
NC State	10	–	8	.556	22	–	14	.611
Syracuse	9	–	9	.500	18	–	13	.581
Clemson	8	–	10	.444	16	–	15	.516
Florida State	8	–	10	.444	17	–	16	.515
Pittsburgh	8	–	10	.444	19	–	15	.559
Wake Forest	5	–	13	.278	13	–	19	.406
Boston College	4	–	14	.222	13	–	19	.406
Georgia Tech	3	–	15	.167	12	–	19	.387
Virginia Tech	2	–	16	.111	11	–	22	.333
No. 17 Louisville*	0	–	6	.000	0	–	8	.000
† ACC tournament winner Rankings from AP poll *Louisville: 24 reg. season games, 4 postseason games vacated due to sanctions against the program; Disputed Record-(27-9)(12-6)

The 2015 Atlantic Coast Conference men's basketball tournament was the postseason men's basketball tournament for the Atlantic Coast Conference, held at the Greensboro Coliseum in Greensboro, North Carolina, from March 10 to 14, 2015. The tournament included fourteen of the fifteen ACC teams, as Syracuse did not compete due to a self-imposed postseason ban. Seeds 5 through 10 received a first-round bye, and the top four seeds received a "double bye" through the first round and second rounds. The 2015 tournament was the first to begin on a Tuesday and the first since 1981 to finish on a Saturday. The semifinals and championship game were played in the evening instead of their traditional afternoon timeslot. It was the fourth time a team has played 4 games (NC State in 1997 and 2007, Georgia Tech in 2010). ESPN and the ACC Network televised all games, and the championship game was moved to Saturday to facilitate a prime-time broadcast on ESPN.

== Seeds ==
Seeds for the tournament are determined by teams' conference records, with tiebreakers determined according to ACC tiebreaker rules.

Seed	School	Conf	Tiebreaker
1	Virginia^{†‡}	16–2	
2	Duke^{†}	15–3	
3	Notre Dame^{†}	14–4	
4	Louisville^{†}	12–6	
5	North Carolina^{#}	11–7	
6	Miami^{#}	10–8	1–0 vs. NC State
7	NC State^{#}	10–8	0–1 vs. Miami
8	Clemson^{#}	8–10	2–1 vs. Florida State, Pittsburgh
9	Florida State^{#}	8–10	2–2 vs. Clemson, Pittsburgh
10	Pittsburgh^{#}	8–10	1–2 vs. Clemson, Florida State
11	Wake Forest	5–13	
12	Boston College	4–14	
13	Georgia Tech	3–15	
14	Virginia Tech	2–16	
‡ – ACC regular season champions, and tournament No. 1 seed. † – Received a first and second-round bye in the conference tournament. # – Received a first-round bye in the conference tournament. Overall records include all games played in the ACC Tournament.

== Schedule ==
Session	Game	Time*	Matchup^{#}	Final score	Television	Attendance
First round – Tuesday, March 10
Opening day	1	1:00 pm	#12 Boston College vs #13 Georgia Tech	66–65	ESPN2; ACC Network	9,003
Opening day	2	3:00 pm	#11 Wake Forest vs #14 Virginia Tech	80–81	ESPN2; ACC Network	9,003
Second round – Wednesday, March 11
1	3	Noon	#8 Clemson vs #9 Florida State	73–76	ESPN; ACC Network	22,026
1	4	2:00 pm	#5 North Carolina vs #12 Boston College	81–63	ESPN; ACC Network	22,026
2	5	7:00 pm	#7 NC State vs #10 Pittsburgh	81–70	ESPN2; ACC Network	22,026
2	6	9:00 pm	#6 Miami vs #14 Virginia Tech	59–49	ESPN2; ACC Network	22,026
Quarterfinals – Thursday, March 12
3	7	Noon	#1 Virginia vs #9 Florida State	58–44	ESPN; ACC Network	22,026
3	8	2:00 pm	#4 Louisville vs #5 North Carolina	60–70	ESPN; ACC Network	22,026
4	9	7:00 pm	#2 Duke vs #7 NC State	77–53	ESPN; ACC Network	22,026
4	10	9:00 pm	#3 Notre Dame vs #6 Miami	70–63	ESPN; ACC Network	22,026
Semifinals – Friday, March 13
5	11	7:00 pm	#1 Virginia vs #5 North Carolina	67–71	ESPN; ACC Network	22,026
5	12	9:00 pm	#2 Duke vs #3 Notre Dame	64–74	ESPN; ACC Network	22,026
Championship – Saturday, March 14
6	13	8:30 pm	#5 North Carolina vs #3 Notre Dame	82–90	ESPN/ACCN	22,026
*Game times in EDT. #-Rankings denote tournament seed

== Bracket ==
First round Tuesday March 10
12	Boston College	66
13	Georgia Tech	65
11	Wake Forest	80
14	Virginia Tech	81

Second round Wednesday March 11
8	Clemson	73
9	Florida State	76
5	#19 North Carolina	81
12	Boston College	63
7	NC State	81
10	Pittsburgh	70
6	Miami	59
14	Virginia Tech	49

Quarterfinals; Thursday March 12
1	#3 Virginia	58
9	Florida State	44
4	#14 Louisville	60
5	#19 North Carolina	70
2	#2 Duke	77
7	NC State	53
3	#11 Notre Dame	70
6	Miami	63

Semifinals; Friday March 13
1	#3 Virginia	67
5	#19 North Carolina	71
2	#2 Duke	64
3	#11 Notre Dame	74

Championship Game; Saturday March 14
5	#19 North Carolina	82
3	#11 Notre Dame	90

== Awards and honors ==
Tournament MVP: Jerian Grant, Notre Dame

All-Tournament Teams:

First Team
- Jerian Grant, Notre Dame
- Steve Vasturia, Notre Dame
- Pat Connaughton, Notre Dame
- Marcus Paige, North Carolina
- Brice Johnson, North Carolina

Second Team
- Demetrius Jackson, Notre Dame
- Justin Jackson, North Carolina
- Jahlil Okafor, Duke
- Cat Barber, NC State
- Malcolm Brogdon, Virginia

== See also ==
- 2015 ACC women's basketball tournament
