= 2014–15 Wake Forest Demon Deacons men's basketball team =

American college basketball season

2014–15 Wake Forest Demon Deacons men's basketball
- Conference: Atlantic Coast Conference
- Record: 13–19 (5–13 ACC)
- Head coach: Danny Manning (1st season)
- Assistant coaches: Steve Woodberry; Randolph Childress; Brett Ballard
- Home arena: LJVM Coliseum

2014–15 ACC men's basketball standings
	Conf.				Overall
Team	W		L	PCT	W		L	PCT
No. 6 Virginia	16	–	2	.889	30	–	4	.882
No. 4 Duke	15	–	3	.833	35	–	4	.897
No. 8 Notre Dame †	14	–	4	.778	32	–	6	.842
No. 15 North Carolina	11	–	7	.611	26	–	12	.684
Miami (FL)	10	–	8	.556	25	–	13	.658
NC State	10	–	8	.556	22	–	14	.611
Syracuse	9	–	9	.500	18	–	13	.581
Clemson	8	–	10	.444	16	–	15	.516
Florida State	8	–	10	.444	17	–	16	.515
Pittsburgh	8	–	10	.444	19	–	15	.559
Wake Forest	5	–	13	.278	13	–	19	.406
Boston College	4	–	14	.222	13	–	19	.406
Georgia Tech	3	–	15	.167	12	–	19	.387
Virginia Tech	2	–	16	.111	11	–	22	.333
No. 17 Louisville*	0	–	6	.000	0	–	8	.000
† ACC tournament winner Rankings from AP poll *Louisville: 24 reg. season games, 4 postseason games vacated due to sanctions against the program; Disputed Record-(27-9)(12-6)

The 2014–15 Wake Forest Demon Deacons men's basketball team represented Wake Forest University during the 2014–15 NCAA Division I men's basketball season. The Demon Deacons were led by first-year head coach Danny Manning. The team played home games at the Lawrence Joel Veterans Memorial Coliseum in Winston-Salem, North Carolina, and was a member of the Atlantic Coast Conference. They finished the season 13–19, 5–11 in ACC play to finish twelfth place. They lost in the first round of the ACC tournament to Virginia Tech.

== Previous season ==
The Demon Deacons finished the season 13–19, 5–13 in ACC play to finish in a three-way tie for 11th place. They advanced to the second round of the ACC tournament where they lost to Pittsburgh.

== Departures ==
Name	Number	Pos.	Height	Weight	Year	Hometown	Notes
Coron Williams	13	G	6'1"	175	GS Senior	Midlothian, VA	Graduated
Miles Overton	20	G	6'4"	210	Sophomore	Philadelphia, PA	Transferred to Drexel
Travis McKie	30	F	6'7"	220	Senior	Richmond, VA	Graduated
Tyler Cavanaugh	34	F	6'9"	230	Sophomore	Dewitt, NY	Transferred to George Washington
Arnaud William Adala Moto	45	F	6'6"	225	Sophomore	Yaoundé, Cameroon	Transferred to Towson

== Recruiting ==
College recruiting information
Name	Hometown	School	Height	Weight	Commit date
Mitch Wilbekin; Guard	Gainesville, Florida	The Rock School	6 ft 1 in (1.85 m)	160 lb (73 kg)	May 5, 2014
Mitch Wilbekin; Guard	Recruit ratings: Scout: Rivals: 247Sports: ESPN:				
Rondale Watson; Guard	Lewisburg, West Virginia	Greenbrier East High School	6 ft 3 in (1.91 m)	180 lb (82 kg)	Sep 18, 2013
Rondale Watson; Guard	Recruit ratings: Scout: Rivals: 247Sports: ESPN:				
Overall recruit ranking:
Note: In many cases, Scout, Rivals, 247Sports, On3, and ESPN may conflict in their listings of height and weight.; In these cases, the average was taken. ESPN grades are on a 100-point scale.; Sources: "2014 Team Ranking". Rivals.

== Roster ==
2014–15 Wake Forest Demon Deacons men's basketball team
Players
Coaches

Pos.	#	Name	Height	Weight	Year	Previous school	Hometown
G	0	Codi Miller-McIntyre	6 ft 3 in (1.91 m)	195 lb (88 kg)	Jr	Hargrave Military Acad.	Concord, NC
G	1	Madison Jones	6 ft 1 in (1.85 m)	160 lb (73 kg)	Jr	Ravencroft School	Raleigh, NC
F	2	Devin Thomas	6 ft 9 in (2.06 m)	245 lb (111 kg)	Jr	Central Dauphin HS	Harrisburg, PA
F	4	Daniel Green	6 ft 10 in (2.08 m)	230 lb (104 kg)	RS Jr	Grapevine HS	Colleyville, TX
G	10	Mitchell Wilbekin	6 ft 1 in (1.85 m)	165 lb (75 kg)	Fr	The Rock School	Gainesville, FL
G	11	Greg McClinton	6 ft 7 in (2.01 m)	185 lb (84 kg)	RS Fr	Hargrave Military Acad.	Winston-Salem, NC
F	13	Darius Leonard	6 ft 9 in (2.06 m)	225 lb (102 kg)	GS	Kestrel Heights HS	Raleigh, NC
G	23	Rondale Watson	6 ft 3 in (1.91 m)	180 lb (82 kg)	Fr	Greenbrier East HS	Lewisburg, WV
F	25	Cornelius Hudson	6 ft 6 in (1.98 m)	180 lb (82 kg)	Fr	Mansfield Timberview HS	Dallas, TX
C	31	Andre Washington	7 ft 0 in (2.13 m)	240 lb (109 kg)	Jr	Hargrave Military Acad.	Roanoke, VA
F	33	Aaron Rountree III	6 ft 8 in (2.03 m)	195 lb (88 kg)	Jr	Greenfield School	Wilson, NC
G	35	Stephen Prendergast	6 ft 1 in (1.85 m)	175 lb (79 kg)	Jr	Don Bosco Prep	Mahwah, NJ
F	42	Gilbert McGregor	6 ft 4 in (1.93 m)	195 lb (88 kg)	RS So	Brewster Academy	New Orleans, LA
G	43	Trent VanHorn	6 ft 3 in (1.91 m)	200 lb (91 kg)	So	Canterbury School	Fort Wayne, IN
F	44	Konstantinos Mitoglou	6 ft 10 in (2.08 m)	225 lb (102 kg)	Fr	Aristoteleio College of Thessaloniki	Thessaloniki, Greece
F	45	Troy Rike	6 ft 7 in (2.01 m)	195 lb (88 kg)	Fr	St. Ignatius College Preparatory	San Francisco, CA
F	51	Grant O'Brien	6 ft 7 in (2.01 m)	195 lb (88 kg)	Jr	The Governor's Academy	North Andover, MA
F	52	Doug Niedrich	6 ft 6 in (1.98 m)	200 lb (91 kg)	Sr	Adlai E. Stevenson HS	Kildeer, IL

Head coach

- Danny Manning (Kansas)

Assistant coach(es)

- Steve Woodberry (Kansas)
- Randolph Childress (Wake Forest)
- Brett Ballard (Kansas)

Legend

- (C) Team captain
- (S) Suspended
- (I) Ineligible
- (W) Walk-on
- Injured
- Current redshirt

Roster

== Schedule ==
Date time, TV	Rank^{#}	Opponent^{#}	Result	Record	Site (attendance) city, state
Exhibition
11/07/2014*; 7:00 pm		Young Harris	W 96–71		LJVM Coliseum (5,206); Winston-Salem, NC
Regular non-conference season
11/14/2014*; 7:00 pm, ESPN3		UNC Asheville	W 80–69	1–0	LJVM Coliseum (9,834); Winston-Salem, NC
11/17/2014*; 8:00 pm, ESPN3		at Tulane	W 71–49	2–0	Devlin Fieldhouse (1,922); New Orleans, LA
11/19/2014*; 9:00 pm, SECN		at Arkansas	L 53–83	2–1	Bud Walton Arena (14,574); Fayetteville, AR
11/21/2014*; 8:30 pm, ESPN3		Iona	L 81–85	2–2	LJVM Coliseum (6,809); Winston-Salem, NC
11/24/2014*; 7:00 pm, ESPN3		Nicholls State	W 75–48	3–2	LJVM Coliseum (6,045); Winston-Salem, NC
11/26/2014*; 7:00 pm, ESPN3		Mount St. Mary's	W 83–49	4–2	LJVM Coliseum (7,166); Winston-Salem, NC
11/28/2014*; 7:00 pm, ESPN3		Delaware State	L 65–72	4–3	LJVM Coliseum (8,064); Winston-Salem, NC
12/02/2014*; 7:00 pm, ESPNU		Minnesota; ACC–Big Ten Challenge	L 69–84	4–4	LJVM Coliseum (8,112); Winston-Salem, NC
12/06/2014; 7:00 pm, ESPNU		at NC State	L 65–78	4–5 (0–1)	PNC Arena (16,615); Raleigh, NC
12/14/2014*; 6:00 pm, ESPN3		Samford	W 86–68	5–5	LJVM Coliseum (6,973); Winston-Salem, NC
12/20/2014*; 5:00 pm, FS1		vs. Florida; Orange Bowl Basketball Classic	L 50–63	5–6	BB&T Center (10,175); Sunrise, FL
12/22/2014*; 7:00 pm, ESPN3		Bucknell	W 60–53	6–6	LJVM Coliseum (9,739); Winston-Salem, NC
12/28/2014*; 4:00 pm, NBCSN		at Richmond	W 65–63	7–6	Robins Center (6,279); Richmond, VA
12/31/2014*; 1:00 pm, ESPN3		Princeton	W 80–66	8–6	LJVM Coliseum (9,245); Winston-Salem, NC
ACC Regular Season
01/04/2015; 8:00 pm, ESPNU		No. 5 Louisville	L 76–85	8–7 (0–2)	LJVM Coliseum (10,862); Winston-Salem, NC
01/07/2015; 9:00 pm, ACCN		No. 2 Duke	L 65–73	8–8 (0–3)	LJVM Coliseum (12,651); Winston-Salem, NC
01/10/2015; 12:00 pm, ACCN		Georgia Tech	W 76–69	9–8 (1–3)	LJVM Coliseum (11,514); Winston-Salem, NC
01/13/2015; 8:00 pm, ACCN		at Syracuse	L 83–86 ^{OT}	9–9 (1–4)	Carrier Dome (23,367); Syracuse, NY
01/21/2015; 7:00 pm, ESPN2		No. 15 North Carolina	L 71–87	9–10 (1–5)	LJVM Coliseum (13,877); Winston-Salem, NC
01/24/2015; 12:00 pm, ACCN		at Clemson	L 57–59	9–11 (1–6)	Littlejohn Coliseum (8,056); Clemson, SC
01/28/2015; 7:00 pm, RSN		at Florida State	L 76–82 ^{2OT}	9–12 (1–7)	Donald L. Tucker Civic Center (6,195); Tallahassee, FL
01/31/2015; 2:00 pm, RSN		Virginia Tech	W 73–70	10–12 (2–7)	LJVM Coliseum (11,752); Winston-Salem, NC
02/03/2015; 8:00 pm, ACCN		NC State	W 88–84	11–12 (3–7)	LJVM Coliseum (10,904); Winston-Salem, NC
02/07/2015; 12:00 pm, RSN		at Georgia Tech	L 59–73	11–13 (3–8)	Hank McCamish Pavilion (6,580); Atlanta, GA
02/11/2015; 7:00 pm, RSN		Miami (FL)	W 72–70	12–13 (4–8)	LJVM Coliseum (9,918); Winston-Salem, NC
02/14/2015; 2:30 pm, ACCN		at No. 2 Virginia	L 60–61	12–14 (4–9)	John Paul Jones Arena (14,593); Charlottesville, VA
02/17/2015; 7:00 pm, ESPN2		at No. 10 Notre Dame	L 75–88	12–15 (4–10)	Purcell Pavilion (8,421); South Bend, IN
02/25/2015; 7:00 pm, RSN		No. 2 Virginia	L 34–70	12–16 (4–11)	LJVM Coliseum (10,772); Winston-Salem, NC
03/01/2015; 6:30 pm, ESPNU		Pittsburgh	W 69–66	13–16 (5–11)	LJVM Coliseum (10,109); Winston-Salem, NC
03/04/2015; 8:00 pm, ACCN		at Duke	L 51–94	13–17 (5–12)	Cameron Indoor Stadium (9,314); Durham, NC
03/07/2015; 2:30 pm, RSN		at Boston College	L 61–79	13–18 (5–13)	Conte Forum (4,838); Chestnut Hill, MA
ACC tournament
03/10/2015; 3:40 pm, ESPN2		vs. Virginia Tech; First Round	L 80–81	13–19	Greensboro Coliseum (9,003); Greensboro, NC
*Non-conference game. ^{#}Rankings from Coaches' Poll. (#) Tournament seedings in parentheses. All times are in Eastern Time..

== Season Highs ==
		Player	Game
Points	31	Devin Thomas	vs. Louisville 1/4/15
Rebounds	18	Devin Thomas	vs. Iona 11/21/14
Assists	7	Codi Miller-McIntyre	vs. Mount St. Mary's 11/26/14
Steals	4	Mitchell Wilbekin/Cornelius Hudson	at Tulane 11/17/14 / vs. Delaware State 11/28/14
Blocks	3	Dinos Mitoglou	vs. Nicholls State 11/24/14
