= 2014–15 Notre Dame Fighting Irish men's basketball team =

American college basketball season

2014–15 Notre Dame Fighting Irish men's basketball

ACC tournament champions

NCAA tournament, Elite Eight
- Conference: Atlantic Coast Conference

Ranking
- Coaches: No. 5
- AP: No. 8
- Record: 32–6 (14–4 ACC)
- Head coach: Mike Brey (15th season)
- Assistant coaches: Anthony Solomon; Rod Balanis; Martin Ingelsby
- Home arena: Purcell Pavilion at the Joyce Center

2014–15 ACC men's basketball standings
	Conf.				Overall
Team	W		L	PCT	W		L	PCT
No. 6 Virginia	16	–	2	.889	30	–	4	.882
No. 4 Duke	15	–	3	.833	35	–	4	.897
No. 8 Notre Dame †	14	–	4	.778	32	–	6	.842
No. 15 North Carolina	11	–	7	.611	26	–	12	.684
Miami (FL)	10	–	8	.556	25	–	13	.658
NC State	10	–	8	.556	22	–	14	.611
Syracuse	9	–	9	.500	18	–	13	.581
Clemson	8	–	10	.444	16	–	15	.516
Florida State	8	–	10	.444	17	–	16	.515
Pittsburgh	8	–	10	.444	19	–	15	.559
Wake Forest	5	–	13	.278	13	–	19	.406
Boston College	4	–	14	.222	13	–	19	.406
Georgia Tech	3	–	15	.167	12	–	19	.387
Virginia Tech	2	–	16	.111	11	–	22	.333
No. 17 Louisville*	0	–	6	.000	0	–	8	.000
† ACC tournament winner Rankings from AP poll *Louisville: 24 reg. season games, 4 postseason games vacated due to sanctions against the program; Disputed Record-(27-9)(12-6)

The 2014–15 Notre Dame Fighting Irish men's basketball team represented the University of Notre Dame during the 2014–15 NCAA Division I men's basketball season. The Fighting Irish, led by fifteenth year head coach Mike Brey, played its home games at the Purcell Pavilion at the Joyce Center in South Bend, Indiana and were second year members of the Atlantic Coast Conference. They finished the season 32–6, 14–4 in ACC play to finish in third place. They defeated Miami (FL), Duke, and North Carolina to become champions of the ACC tournament. They received an automatic bid to the NCAA tournament where they defeated Northeastern in the second round, Butler in the third round, and Wichita State in the Sweet Sixteen before losing in the Elite Eight to unbeaten Kentucky in a close game, 68–66.

== Previous season ==
The Fighting Irish finished the 2012–13 season 25–10, with an 11–7 record in Big East play. They then finished the 2013–14 season at 15–17, 6–12 in ACC play to finish in a three-way tie for 11th place. In their first year as ACC members, they lost in the first round of the ACC tournament to Wake Forrest.

== Departures ==
Name	Number	Pos.	Height	Weight	Year	Hometown	Notes
Eric Atkins	0	G	6'2"	182	Senior	Columbia, MO	Graduated
Cameron Biedscheid	1	F	6'7"	186	Sophomore	St. Louis, MO	Transferred to Missouri
Patrick Crowley	4	G	6'3"	195	Senior	Los Gatos, CA	Graduated
Garrick Sherman	11	C	6'10"	246	RS Senior	Kenton, OH	Graduated
Tom Knight	25	F	6'9"	250	GS Senior	Dixfield, ME	Graduated

== Class of 2014 signees ==
College recruiting
Name	Hometown	School	Height	Weight	Commit date
Bonzie Colson; PF	New Bedford, MA	St. Andrew's School	6 ft 6 in (1.98 m)	195 lb (88 kg)	Oct 7, 2013
Bonzie Colson; PF	Recruit ratings: Scout: Rivals: 247Sports: ESPN:				
Martinas Geben; PF	Hagerstown, MD	St. Maria Goretti High School	6 ft 8 in (2.03 m)	220 lb (100 kg)	Sep 6, 2013
Martinas Geben; PF	Recruit ratings: Scout: Rivals: 247Sports: ESPN:				
Matt Farrell; SG	Point Pleasant, NJ	Point Pleasant Beach High School	6 ft 2 in (1.88 m)	170 lb (77 kg)	Nov 3, 2013
Matt Farrell; SG	Recruit ratings: Scout: Rivals: 247Sports: ESPN:				
Overall recruit ranking: Scout: 15 Rivals: 20 ESPN: 17
Note: In many cases, Scout, Rivals, 247Sports, On3, and ESPN may conflict in their listings of height and weight.; In these cases, the average was taken. ESPN grades are on a 100-point scale.; Sources: "Notre Dame 2014 Basketball Commitments". Rivals.; "2014 Notre Dame Commits". Scout.; "2014 Player Commitments – Notre Dame". ESPN.; "Scout.com Team Recruiting Rankings". Scout.; "2014 Team Ranking". Rivals.

== Roster ==
2014–15 Notre Dame Fighting Irish men's basketball team
Players
Coaches

Pos.	#	Name	Height	Weight	Year	Previous school	Hometown
F	1	Austin Torres	6 ft 7 in (2.01 m)	218 lb (99 kg)	RS Fr	Penn	Granger, Indiana
F	3	V. J. Beachem	6 ft 8 in (2.03 m)	187 lb (85 kg)	So	New Haven	Fort Wayne, Indiana
G	5	Matt Farrell	6 ft 1 in (1.85 m)	170 lb (77 kg)	Fr	Point Pleasant Beach	Point Pleasant, New Jersey
G	11	Demetrius Jackson	6 ft 1 in (1.85 m)	195 lb (88 kg)	So	Marian	Mishawaka, Indiana
F	15	Eric Katenda	6 ft 9 in (2.06 m)	230 lb (104 kg)	Jr	Sunrise Academy (KS)	Paris, France
F	20	Austin Burgett	6 ft 9 in (2.06 m)	227 lb (103 kg)	Jr	Avon	Avon, Indiana
F	21	Matt Gregory (W)	6 ft 6 in (1.98 m)	200 lb (91 kg)	Fr	Cathedral	Avon, Indiana
G	22	Jerian Grant	6 ft 5 in (1.96 m)	202 lb (92 kg)	Sr	DeMatha	Bowie, Maryland
F	23	Martinas Geben	6 ft 9 in (2.06 m)	230 lb (104 kg)	Fr	St. Maria Goretti	Vilnius, Lithuania
G/F	24	Pat Connaughton (C)	6 ft 5 in (1.96 m)	206 lb (93 kg)	Sr	St. John's Prep	Arlington, Massachusetts
F	30	Zach Auguste	6 ft 10 in (2.08 m)	230 lb (104 kg)	Jr	New Hampton	Marlborough, Massachusetts
G	32	Steve Vasturia	6 ft 5 in (1.96 m)	211 lb (96 kg)	So	St. Joseph's Prep	Medford, New Jersey
F	35	Bonzie Colson	6 ft 5 in (1.96 m)	225 lb (102 kg)	Fr	St. Andrew's School	New Bedford, Massachusetts

Head coach

- Mike Brey

Assistant coach(es)

- Anthony Solomon
- Rod Balanis
- Martin Ingelsby

Legend

- (C) Team captain
- (S) Suspended
- (I) Ineligible
- (W) Walk-on
- Injured
- Current redshirt

Roster

== Schedule and results ==
Date time, TV	Rank^{#}	Opponent^{#}	Result	Record	Site (attendance) city, state
Exhibition
11/01/2014*; 2:00 pm		Minnesota–Duluth	W 88–71		Edmund P. Joyce Center (6,167); South Bend, IN
11/07/2014*; 7:00 pm		Lewis	W 82–59		Edmund P. Joyce Center (6,239); South Bend, IN
Regular season
11/14/2014*; 9:00 pm		Binghamton; Hall of Fame Tip Off	W 82–39	1–0	Edmund P. Joyce Center (7,360); South Bend, IN
11/16/2014*; 2:00 pm, ESPN3		Navy; Hall of Fame Tip Off	W 92–53	2–0	Edmund P. Joyce Center (7,049); South Bend, IN
11/19/2014*; 7:00 pm		Coppin State	W 104–67	3–0	Edmund P. Joyce Center (6,343); South Bend, IN
11/22/2014*; 12:00 pm, ESPN3		vs. Massachusetts; Hall of Fame Tip Off	W 81–68	4–0	Mohegan Sun Arena (N/A); Uncasville, CT
11/23/2014*; 2:30 pm, ESPN2		vs. Providence; Hall of Fame Tip Off	L 74–75	4–1	Mohegan Sun Arena (6,513); Uncasville, CT
11/26/2014*; 7:00 pm		Grambling State	W 81–54	5–1	Edmund P. Joyce Center (5,485); South Bend, IN
11/29/2014*; 12:00 pm, ESPN3		Chicago State	W 90–42	6–1	Edmund P. Joyce Center (5,381); South Bend, IN
12/03/2014*; 7:15 pm, ESPN2		No. 19 Michigan State; ACC–Big Ten Challenge	W 79–78 ^{OT}	7–1	Edmund P. Joyce Center (9,149); South Bend, IN
12/06/2014*; 8:00 pm		Fairleigh Dickinson	W 75–57	8–1	Edmund P. Joyce Center (6,991); South Bend, IN
12/09/2014*; 7:00 pm, ESPN3	No. 25	Mount St. Mary's	W 93–67	9–1	Edmund P. Joyce Center (6,647); South Bend, IN
12/13/2014; 8:00 pm, ESPN2	No. 25	Florida State	W 83–63	10–1 (1–0)	Edmund P. Joyce Center (7,691); South Bend, IN
12/20/2014*; 5:15 pm, BTN	No. 21	vs. Purdue; Crossroads Classic	W 94–63	11–1	Bankers Life Fieldhouse (14,753); Indianapolis, IN
12/22/2014*; 7:00 pm	No. 16	Northern Illinois	W 91–66	12–1	Edmund P. Joyce Center (7,471); South Bend, IN
12/30/2014*; 7:00 pm, ESPN3	No. 14	Hartford	W 87–60	13–1	Edmund P. Joyce Center (6,803); South Bend, IN
01/03/2015; 2:30 pm, ACCN	No. 14	Georgia Tech	W 83–76 ^{2OT}	14–1 (2–0)	Edmund P. Joyce Center (7,582); South Bend, IN
01/05/2015; 7:00 pm, ESPN	No. 13	at No. 18 North Carolina	W 71–70	15–1 (3–0)	Dean Smith Center (20,604); Chapel Hill, NC
01/10/2015; 6:00 pm, ESPN2	No. 13	No. 3 Virginia	L 56–62	15–2 (3–1)	Edmund P. Joyce Center (9,149); South Bend, IN
01/14/2015; 7:00 pm, RSN	No. 12	at Georgia Tech	W 62–59	16–2 (4–1)	Hank McCamish Pavilion (7,282); Atlanta, GA
01/17/2015; 2:00 pm, ESPN2	No. 12	Miami (FL)	W 75–70	17–2 (5–1)	Edmund P. Joyce Center (9,149); South Bend, IN
01/22/2015; 7:00 pm, RSN	No. 8	at Virginia Tech	W 85–60	18–2 (6–1)	Cassell Coliseum (7,451); Blacksburg, VA
01/25/2015; 6:30 pm, ESPNU	No. 8	at NC State	W 81–78 ^{OT}	19–2 (7–1)	PNC Arena (19,500); Raleigh, NC
01/28/2015; 7:30 pm, ESPN2	No. 8	No. 4 Duke	W 77–73	20–2 (8–1)	Edmund P. Joyce Center (9,149); South Bend, IN
01/31/2015; 12:00 pm, ACCN	No. 8	at Pittsburgh	L 72–76	20–3 (8–2)	Peterson Events Center (12,508); Pittsburgh, PA
02/04/2015; 7:00 pm, RSN	No. 10	Boston College	W 71–63	21–3 (9–2)	Edmund P. Joyce Center (8,458); South Bend, IN
02/07/2015; 1:00 pm, CBS	No. 10	at No. 4 Duke	L 60–90	21–4 (9–3)	Cameron Indoor Stadium (9,314); Durham, NC
02/10/2015; 7:00 pm, ESPN2	No. 10	at Clemson	W 60–58	22–4 (10–3)	Littlejohn Coliseum (8,965); Clemson, SC
02/17/2015; 7:00 pm, ESPNU	No. 10	Wake Forest	W 88–75	23–4 (11–3)	Edmund P. Joyce Center (8,421); South Bend, IN
02/21/2015; 4:00 pm, RSN	No. 10	at Boston College	W 87–70	24–4 (12–3)	Conte Forum (8,366); Chestnut Hill, MA
02/24/2015; 8:00 pm, ACCN	No. 9	Syracuse	L 60–65	24–5 (12–4)	Edmund P. Joyce Center (9,149); South Bend, IN
03/04/2015; 7:00 pm, ESPN2	No. 12	at No. 16 Louisville	W 71–59	25–5 (13–4)	KFC Yum! Center (21,024); Louisville, KY
03/07/2015; 4:00 pm, ACCN/RSN	No. 12	Clemson	W 81–67	26–5 (14–4)	Edmund P. Joyce Center (9,149); South Bend, IN
ACC Tournament
03/12/2015; 9:00 pm, ESPN	No. 11	vs. Miami (FL); Quarterfinals	W 70–63	27–5	Greensboro Coliseum (22,026); Greensboro, NC
03/13/2015; 9:00 pm, ESPN	No. 11	vs. No. 2 Duke; Semifinals	W 74–64	28–5	Greensboro Coliseum (22,026); Greensboro, NC
03/14/2015; 8:30 pm, ESPN	No. 11	vs. No. 19 North Carolina; Championship Game	W 90–82	29–5	Greensboro Coliseum (22,206); Greensboro, NC
NCAA tournament
03/19/2015*; 12:15 pm, CBS	(3 MW) No. 8	vs. (14 MW) Northeastern; Second Round	W 69–65	30–5	Consol Energy Center (15,818); Pittsburgh, PA
03/21/2015*; 9:40 pm, TBS	(3 MW) No. 8	vs. (6 MW) No. 24 Butler; Third Round	W 67–64 ^{OT}	31–5	Consol Energy Center (18,762); Pittsburgh, PA
03/26/2015*; 7:15 pm, CBS	(3 MW) No. 8	vs. (7 MW) No. 14 Wichita State; Sweet Sixteen	W 81–70	32–5	Quicken Loans Arena (19,465); Cleveland, OH
03/28/2015*; 8:49 pm, TBS	(3 MW) No. 8	vs. (1 MW) No. 1 Kentucky; Elite Eight	L 66–68	32–6	Quicken Loans Arena (19,464); Cleveland, OH
*Non-conference game. ^{#}Rankings from AP Poll. (#) Tournament seedings in parentheses. MW=Midwest region. All times are in Eastern Time. Source:

== Rankings ==
Ranking movement Legend: ██ Increase in ranking. ██ Decrease in ranking. (RV) Received votes but unranked. (NR) Not ranked.
Poll	Pre	Wk 2	Wk 3	Wk 4	Wk 5	Wk 6	Wk 7	Wk 8	Wk 9	Wk 10	Wk 11	Wk 12	Wk 13	Wk 14	Wk 15	Wk 16	Wk 17	Wk 18	Wk 19	Final
AP	RV	RV	NR	RV	25	21	16	14	13	12	8	8	10	10	10	9	12	11	9	N/A
Coaches	RV	RV	RV	RV	RV	21	16	13	12	12	9	8	10	11	10	8	11	9	8	5
