= 2014–15 Atlantic Coast Conference men's basketball season =

- League: NCAA Division I
- Sport: Basketball
- Teams: 15
- TV partner(s): ACCN, ESPN, Raycom Sports, Regional Sports Networks, CBS

Regular season
- First place: Virginia
- Season MVP: Jahlil Okafor, Duke

ACC tournament
- Champions: Notre Dame
- Runners-up: North Carolina
- Finals MVP: Jerian Grant, Notre Dame

Atlantic Coast Conference men's basketball seasons
- ← 2013–14 2015–16 →

2014–15 ACC men's basketball standings
| | Conf. | | | | Overall |
| Team | W | | L | PCT | W | | L | PCT |
|---|---|---|---|---|---|---|---|---|
| No. 6 Virginia | 16 | – | 2 | .889 | 30 | – | 4 | .882 |
| No. 4 Duke | 15 | – | 3 | .833 | 35 | – | 4 | .897 |
| No. 8 Notre Dame † | 14 | – | 4 | .778 | 32 | – | 6 | .842 |
| No. 15 North Carolina | 11 | – | 7 | .611 | 26 | – | 12 | .684 |
| Miami (FL) | 10 | – | 8 | .556 | 25 | – | 13 | .658 |
| NC State | 10 | – | 8 | .556 | 22 | – | 14 | .611 |
| Syracuse | 9 | – | 9 | .500 | 18 | – | 13 | .581 |
| Clemson | 8 | – | 10 | .444 | 16 | – | 15 | .516 |
| Florida State | 8 | – | 10 | .444 | 17 | – | 16 | .515 |
| Pittsburgh | 8 | – | 10 | .444 | 19 | – | 15 | .559 |
| Wake Forest | 5 | – | 13 | .278 | 13 | – | 19 | .406 |
| Boston College | 4 | – | 14 | .222 | 13 | – | 19 | .406 |
| Georgia Tech | 3 | – | 15 | .167 | 12 | – | 19 | .387 |
| Virginia Tech | 2 | – | 16 | .111 | 11 | – | 22 | .333 |
| No. 17 Louisville* | 0 | – | 6 | .000 | 0 | – | 8 | .000 |
† ACC tournament winner Rankings from AP poll *Louisville: 24 reg. season games, 4 postseason games vacated due to sanctions against the program; Disputed Record-(27-9)(12-6)

The 2014–15 Atlantic Coast Conference men's basketball season began with practices in October 2014, followed by the start of the 2014–15 NCAA Division I men's basketball season in November. Conference play started in early January 2015 and concluded in March with the 2015 ACC men's basketball tournament at the Greensboro Coliseum in Greensboro, North Carolina. The 2014–15 season marked the first season in conference history without Maryland as a member; they departed the ACC for the Big Ten Conference in July 2014 and the first season for Louisville.

== Preseason ==
ACC recruits at the 2014 McDonald's All-American Boys Game

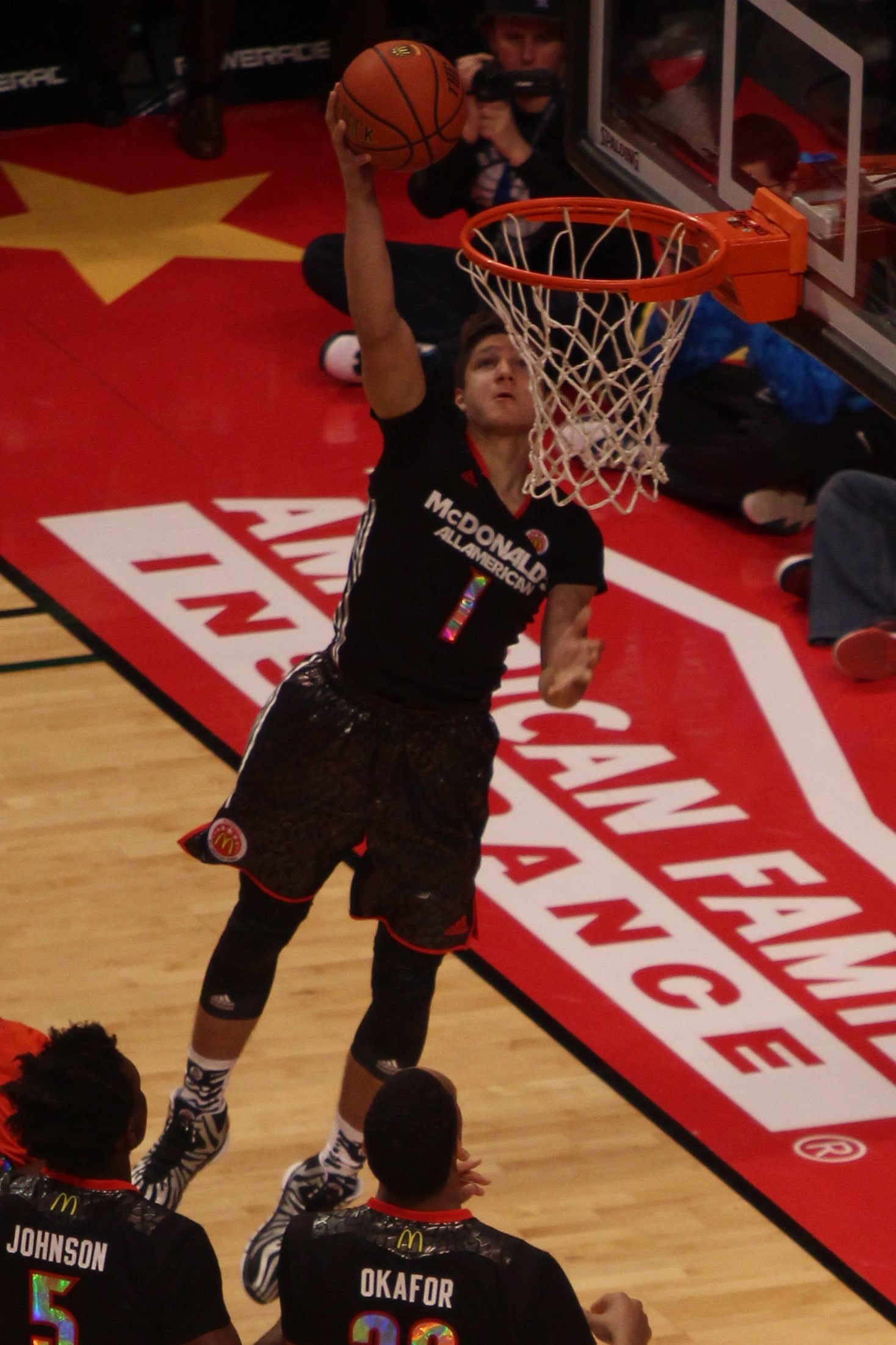
Grayson Allen, Duke

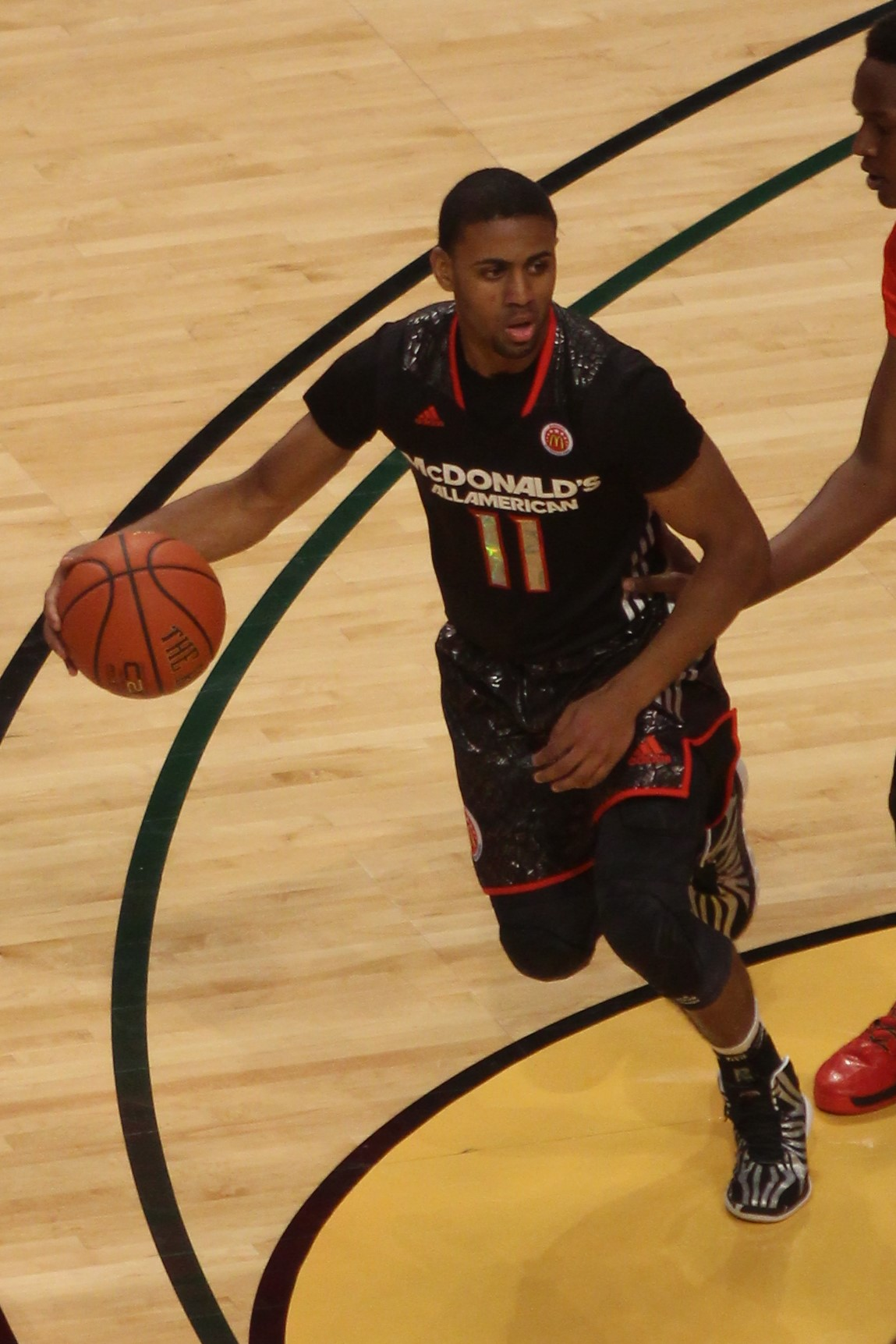
Joel Berry II, UNC

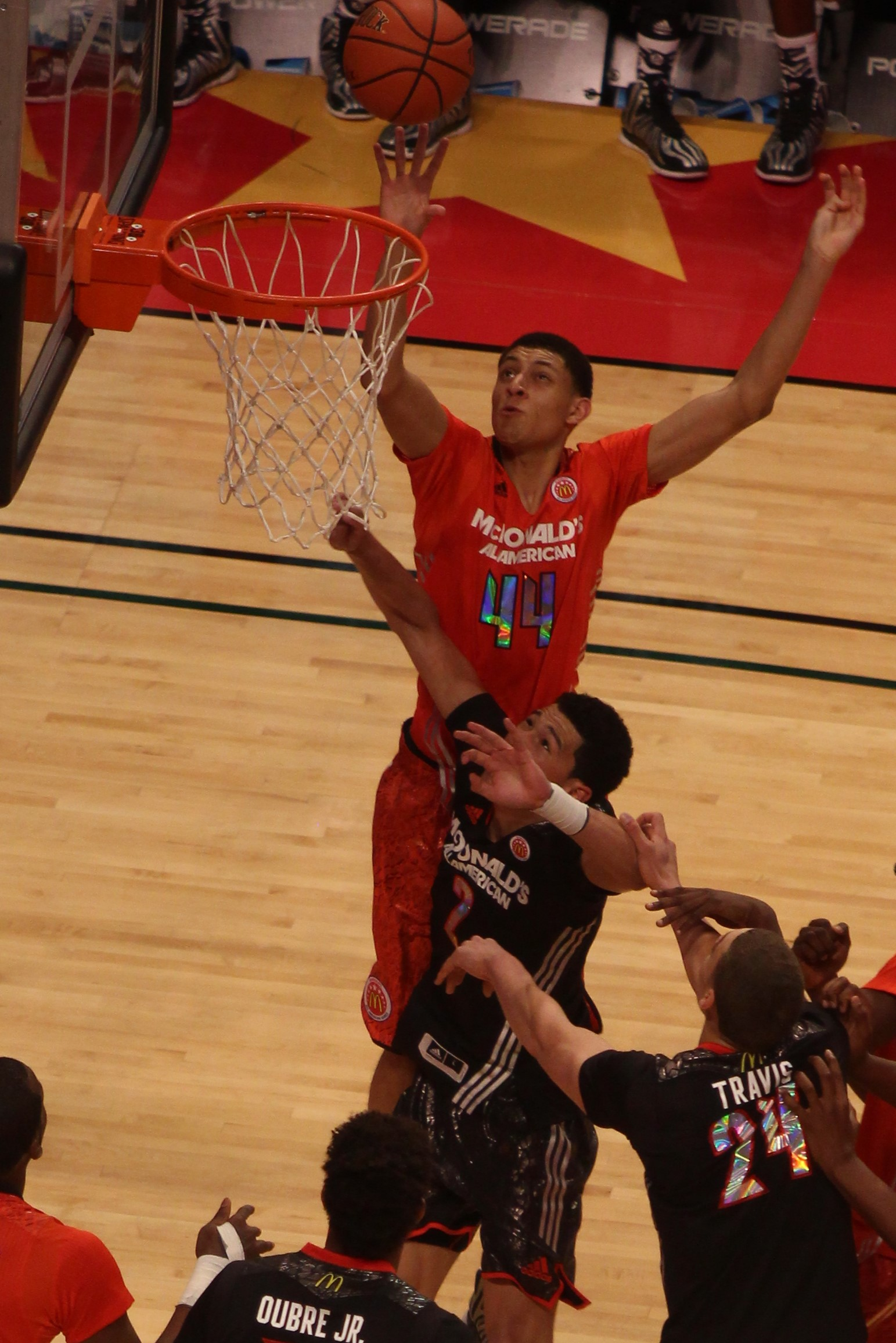
Justin Jackson, UNC

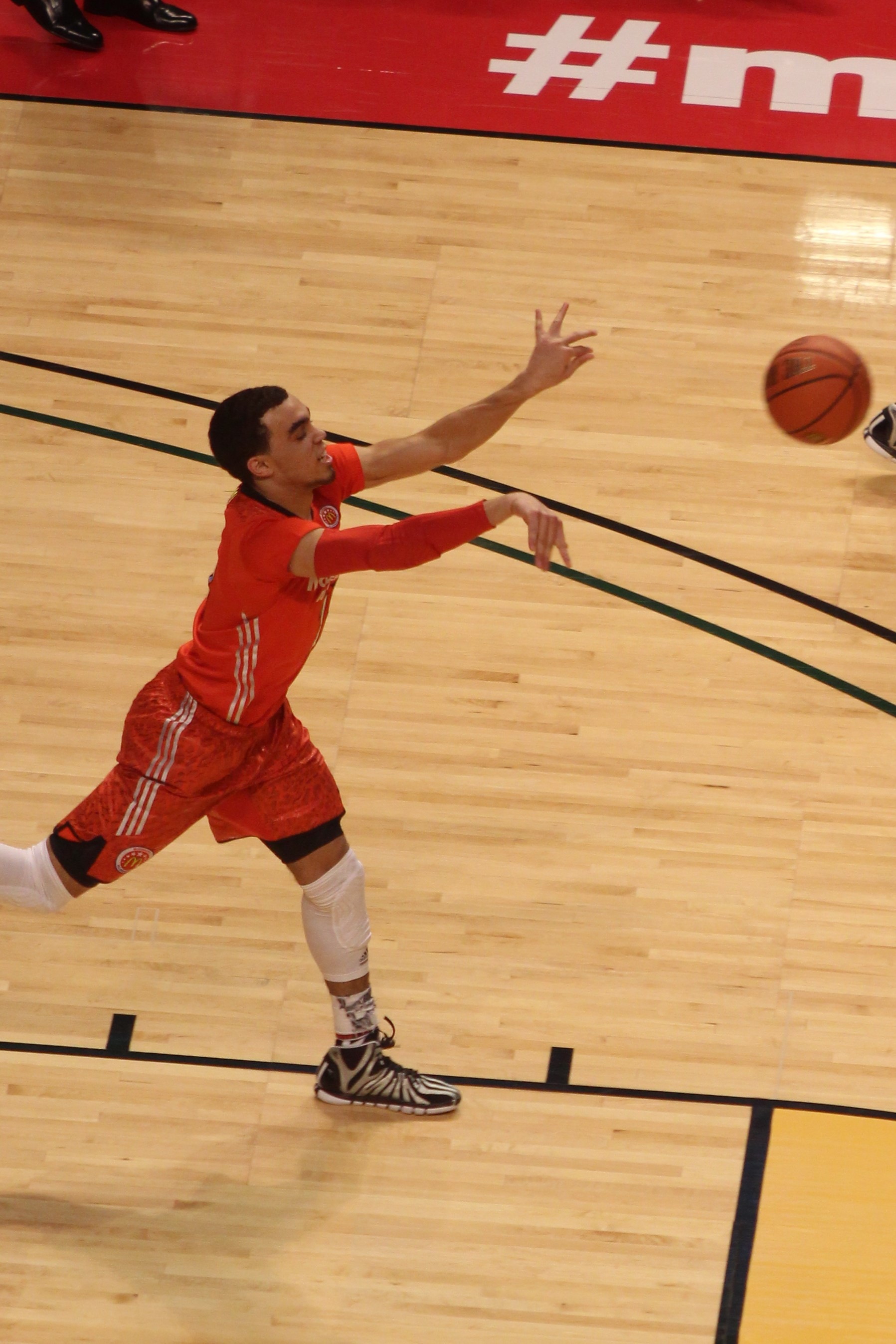
Tyus Jones, Duke

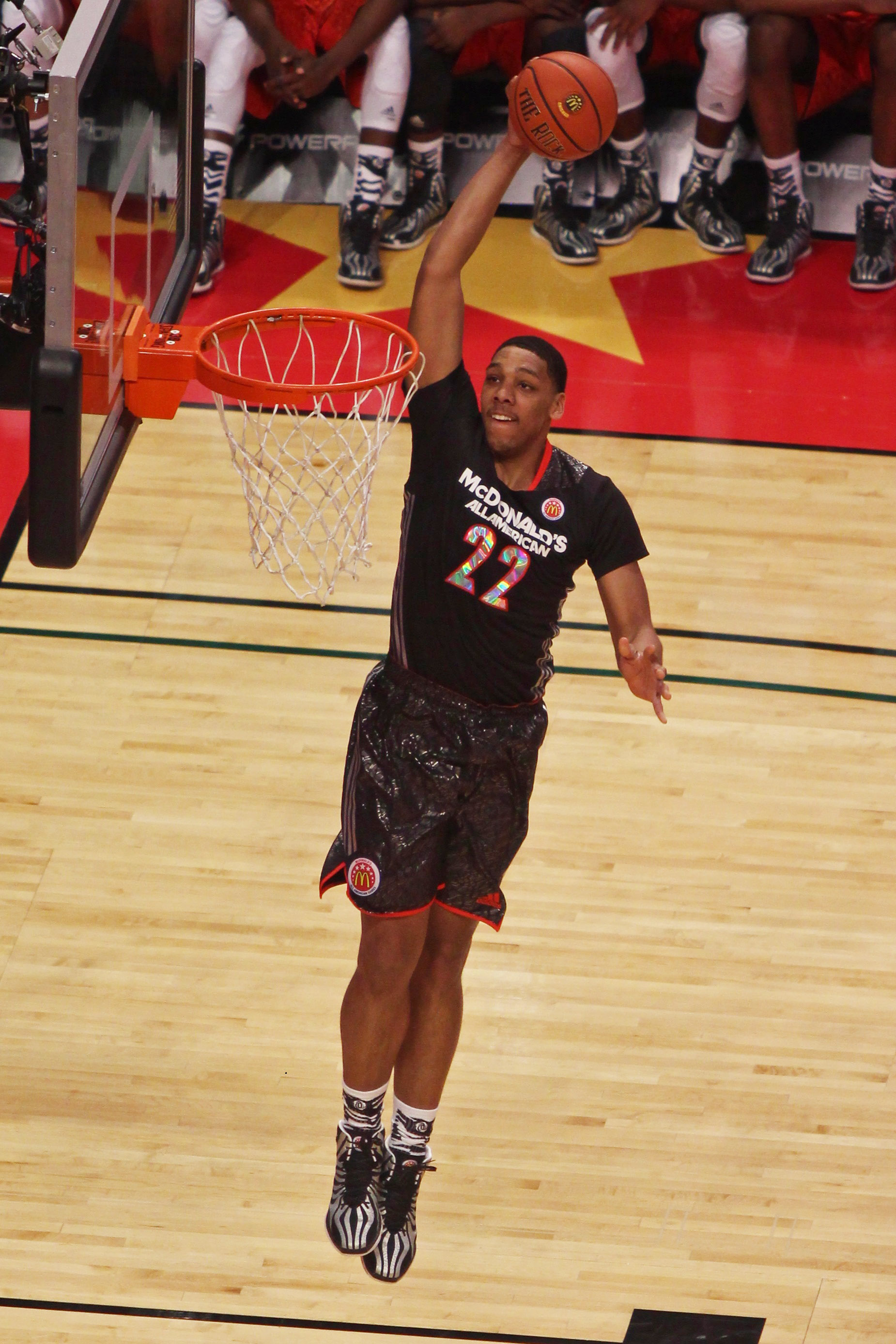
Jahlil Okafor, Duke

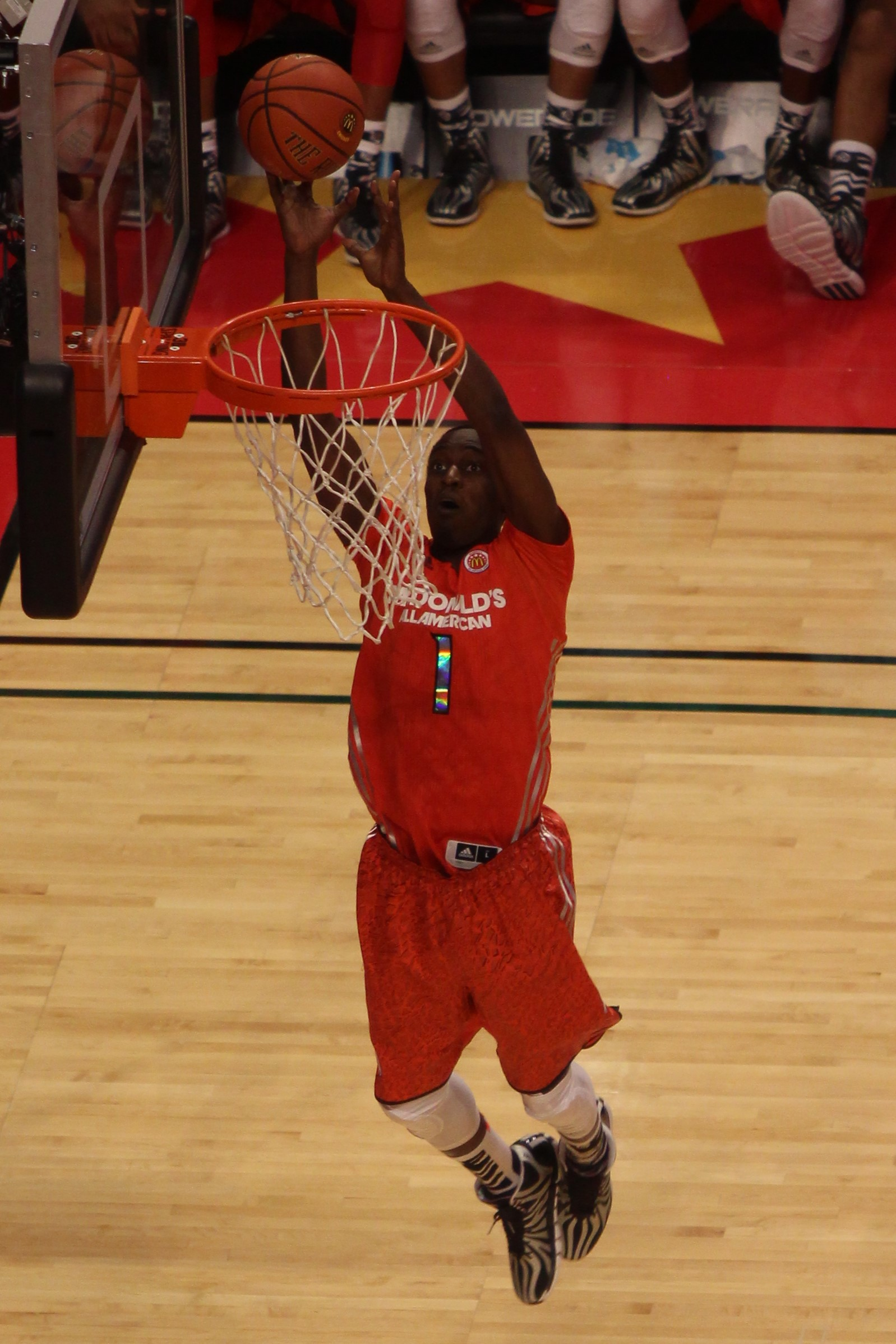
Theo Pinson, UNC

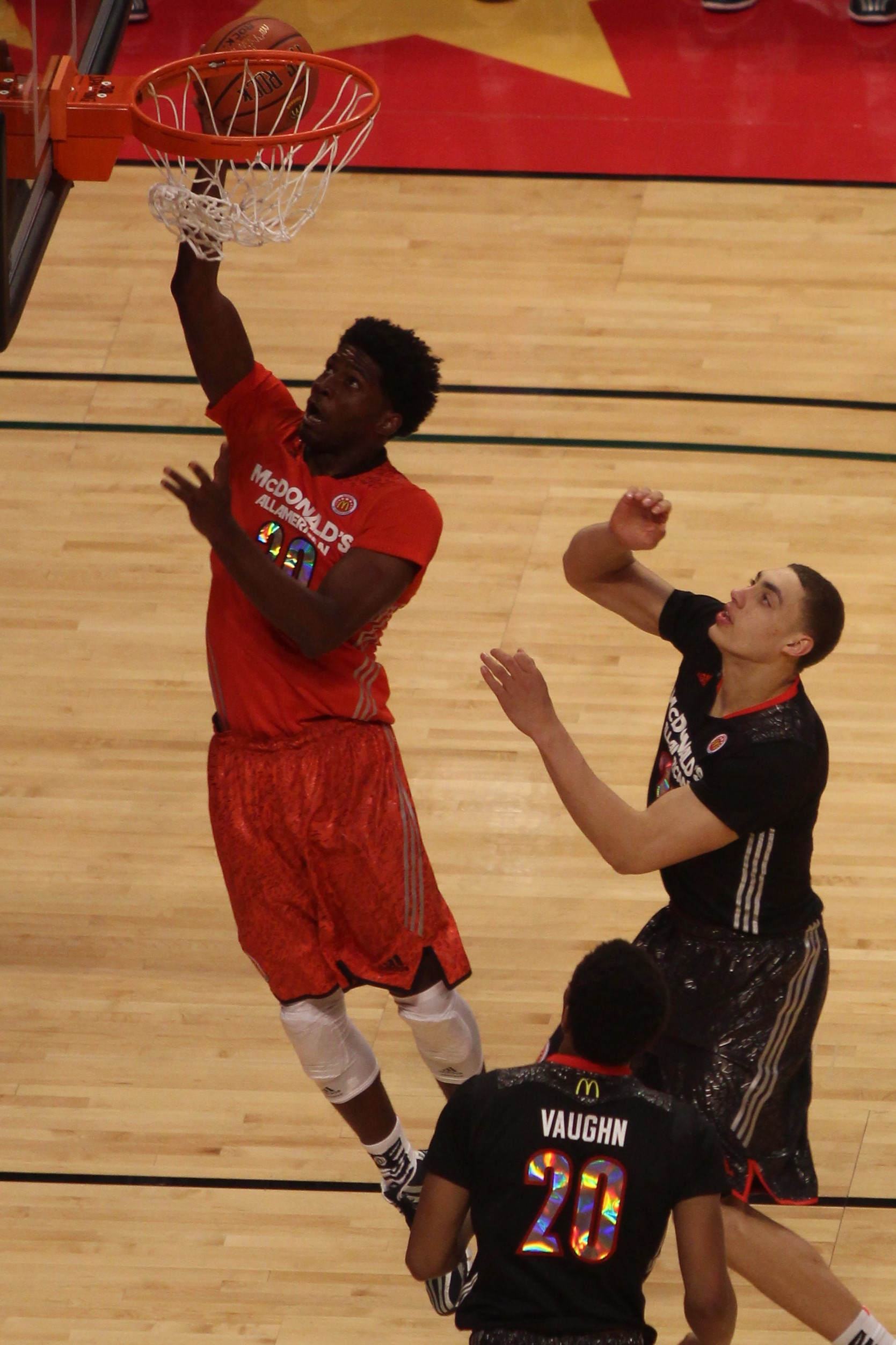
Justise Winslow, Duke

== Rankings ==
Legend
| Increase in ranking |
| Decrease in ranking |
| Not ranked previous week |

| | | Pre | Wk 2 | Wk 3 | Wk 4 | Wk 5 | Wk 6 | Wk 7 | Wk 8 | Wk 9 | Wk 10 | Wk 11 | Wk 12 | Wk 13 | Wk 14 | Wk 15 | Wk 16 | Wk 17 | Wk 18 | Wk 19 | Final |
|---|---|---|---|---|---|---|---|---|---|---|---|---|---|---|---|---|---|---|---|---|---|
| Boston College | AP | | | | | | | | | | | | | | | | | | | | |
| Boston College | C | | | | | | | | | | | | | | | | | | | | |
| Clemson | AP | | | | | | | | | | | | | | | | | | | | |
| Clemson | C | | | | | | | | | | | | | | | | | | | | |
| Duke | AP | 4 | 4 | 4 | 4 | 2 | 2 | 2 | 2 | 2 | 4 | 4 | 4 | 4 | 4 | 4 | 4 | 3 | 2 | 4 | N/A |
| Duke | C | 3 | 3 | 2 | 2 | 2 | 2 | 2 | 2 | 2 | 4 | 4 | 4 | 5 | 5 | 5 | 5 | 3 | 2 | 5 | 1 |
| Florida State | AP | RV | RV | NR | | | | | | | | | | | | | | | | | |
| Florida State | C | RV | NR | | | | | | | | | | | | | | | | | | |
| Georgia Tech | AP | | | | | | | | | | | | | | | | | | | | |
| Georgia Tech | C | | | | | | | | | | | | | | | | | | | | |
| Louisville | AP | 8 | 7 | 6 | 5 | 4 | 4 | 4 | 5 | 5 | 6 | 10 | 10 | 9 | 9 | 12 | 17 | 16 | 14 | 17 | N/A |
| Louisville | C | 9 | 8 | 5 | 5 | 4 | 4 | 4 | 5 | 5 | 7 | 10 | 10 | 8 | 8 | 12 | 15 | 14 | 13 | 16 | 10 |
| Miami | AP | | RV | 17 | 15 | 20 | 18 | RV | NR | | | RV | 23 | | | | | | | | |
| Miami | C | RV | RV | 20 | 15 | 20 | 21 | 19 | RV | NR | | RV | 23 | | | | | | | | |
| North Carolina | AP | 6 | 6 | 5 | 12 | 21 | 24 | 20 | 19 | 18 | 15 | 15 | 13 | 12 | 12 | 15 | 15 | 19 | 19 | 15 | N/A |
| North Carolina | C | 6 | 6 | 6 | 12 | 18 | 24 | 21 | 20 | 17 | 16 | 15 | 14 | 13 | 15 | 16 | 18 | 19 | 19 | 14 | 12 |
| NC State | AP | RV | RV | RV | RV | RV | NR | | | | RV | | | | | | | | | | N/A |
| NC State | C | | | | RV | RV | NR | | | | RV | RV | | | | | | | | | 24 |
| Notre Dame | AP | RV | RV | NR | RV | 25 | 21 | 16 | 14 | 13 | 12 | 8 | 8 | 10 | 10 | 10 | 9 | 12 | 11 | 8 | N/A |
| Notre Dame | C | RV | RV | RV | RV | RV | 21 | 16 | 13 | 12 | 12 | 9 | 8 | 10 | 11 | 10 | 8 | 11 | 9 | 8 | 5 |
| Pittsburgh | AP | RV | RV | NR | | | | | | | | | | | | | | | | | |
| Pittsburgh | C | RV | RV | NR | | | | | | | | | | | | | | | | | |
| Syracuse | AP | 23 | 23 | RV | RV | NR | | | | | RV | | | | | | | | | | |
| Syracuse | C | 24 | 24 | RV | NR | | | | | | | | | | | | | | | | |
| Virginia | AP | 9 | 9 | 8 | 7 | 6 | 6 | 5 | 3 | 3 | 2 | 2 | 2 | 3 | 2 | 2 | 2 | 2 | 3 | 6 | N/A |
| Virginia | C | 8 | 9 | 7 | 6 | 5 | 5 | 5 | 3 | 3 | 2 | 2 | 2 | 3 | 2 | 3 | 3 | 2 | 4 | 6 | 8 |
| Virginia Tech | AP | | | | | | | | | | | | | | | | | | | | |
| Virginia Tech | C | | | | | | | | | | | | | | | | | | | | |
| Wake Forest | AP | | | | | | | | | | | | | | | | | | | | |
| Wake Forest | C | | | | | | | | | | | | | | | | | | | | |

== Regular season ==
=== Conference matrix ===
This table summarizes the head-to-head results between teams in conference play. (x) indicates games remaining this season.

| | Boston College | Clemson | Duke | Florida State | Georgia Tech | Louisville | Miami | North Carolina | NC State | Notre Dame | Pittsburgh | Syracuse | Virginia | Virginia Tech | Wake Forest |
|---|---|---|---|---|---|---|---|---|---|---|---|---|---|---|---|
| vs. Boston College | – | 1–0 | 1–0 | 1–0 | 0–1 | 1–0 | 2–0 | 1–0 | 0–1 | 2–0 | 2–0 | 2–0 | 1-0 | 0–1 | 0–1 |
| vs. Clemson | 0–1 | – | 1–0 | 1–1 | 1–1 | 1–0 | 1–0 | 1–0 | 1–1 | 2–0 | 0–1 | 0–1 | 1–0 | 0–1 | 0–1 |
| vs. Duke | 0–1 | 0–1 | – | 0–1 | 0–1 | 0–1 | 1–0 | 0–2 | 1–0 | 1–1 | 0–1 | 0–2 | 0–1 | 0–1 | 0–2 |
| vs. Florida State | 0–1 | 1–1 | 1–0 | – | 0–1 | 1–0 | 1–1 | 1–0 | 1–0 | 1–0 | 1–1 | 1–0 | 1–0 | 0–2 | 0–1 |
| vs. Georgia Tech | 1–0 | 1–1 | 1–0 | 1–0 | – | 1–0 | 0–1 | 2–0 | 1–0 | 2–0 | 1–0 | 1–0 | 1–0 | 1–0 | 1–1 |
| vs. Louisville | 0–1 | 0–1 | 1–0 | 0–1 | 0–1 | – | 0–2 | 1–1 | 1–0 | 1–0 | 0–2 | 1–0 | 1–1 | 0–1 | 0–1 |
| vs. Miami | 0–2 | 0–1 | 0–1 | 1–1 | 1–0 | 2–0 | – | 1–0 | 0–1 | 1–0 | 0–1 | 0–1 | 1–0 | 0–2 | 1–0 |
| vs. North Carolina | 0–1 | 0–1 | 2–0 | 0–1 | 0–2 | 1–1 | 0–1 | – | 1–1 | 1–0 | 1–0 | 0–1 | 1–0 | 0–1 | 0–1 |
| vs. NC State | 1–0 | 1–1 | 0–1 | 0–1 | 0–1 | 0–1 | 1–0 | 1–1 | – | 1–0 | 0–1 | 0–1 | 2–0 | 0–1 | 1–1 |
| vs. Notre Dame | 0–2 | 0–2 | 1–1 | 0–1 | 0–2 | 0–1 | 0–1 | 0–1 | 0–1 | – | 1–0 | 1–0 | 1–0 | 0–1 | 0–1 |
| vs. Pittsburgh | 0–2 | 1–0 | 1–0 | 1–1 | 0–1 | 2–0 | 1–0 | 0–1 | 1–0 | 0–1 | – | 0–2 | 1–0 | 1–0 | 1–0 |
| vs. Syracuse | 0–2 | 1–0 | 2–0 | 0–1 | 0–1 | 0–1 | 1–0 | 1–0 | 1–0 | 0–1 | 2–0 | – | 1–0 | 0–2 | 0–1 |
| vs. Virginia | 0–1 | 0–1 | 1–0 | 0–1 | 0–1 | 1–1 | 0–1 | 0–1 | 0–2 | 0–1 | 0–1 | 0–1 | – | 0–2 | 0–2 |
| vs. Virginia Tech | 1–0 | 1–0 | 1–0 | 2–0 | 0–1 | 1–0 | 2–0 | 1–0 | 1–0 | 1–0 | 0–1 | 2–0 | 2–0 | – | 1–0 |
| vs. Wake Forest | 1–0 | 1–0 | 2–0 | 1–0 | 1–1 | 1–0 | 0–1 | 1–0 | 1–1 | 1–0 | 0–1 | 1–0 | 2–0 | 0–1 | – |
| Total | 4–14 | 8-10 | 15–3 | 8–10 | 3–15 | 12-6 | 10-8 | 11-7 | 10-8 | 14–4 | 8-10 | 9-9 | 16-2 | 2–16 | 5–13 |

== Postseason ==
=== ACC tournament ===
- March 10–14, 2015 Atlantic Coast Conference Basketball Tournament, Greensboro Coliseum, Greensboro.

First round Tuesday March 10
12 | Boston College | 66
13 | Georgia Tech | 65
11 | Wake Forest | 80
14 | Virginia Tech | 81

Second round Wednesday March 11
8 | Clemson | 73
9 | Florida State | 76
5 | North Carolina | 81
12 | Boston College | 63
7 | NC State | 81
10 | Pittsburgh | 70
6 | Miami | 59
14 | Virginia Tech | 49

Quarterfinals; Thursday March 12
1 | Virginia | 58
9 | Florida State | 44
4 | Louisville | 60
5 | North Carolina | 70
2 | Duke | 77
7 | NC State | 53
3 | Notre Dame | 70
6 | Miami | 63

Semifinals; Friday March 13
1 | Virginia | 67
5 | North Carolina | 71
2 | Duke | 64
3 | Notre Dame | 74

Championship Game; Saturday March 14
5 | North Carolina | 82
3 | Notre Dame | 90

=== NCAA tournament ===
| Seed | Region | School | First Four | 2nd round | 3rd round | Sweet 16 | Elite Eight | Final Four | Championship |
|---|---|---|---|---|---|---|---|---|---|
| 1 | South | Duke | | W, 85–56 vs. #16 Robert Morris – (Charlotte) | W, 68–49 vs. #8 San Diego State – (Charlotte) | W, 63–57 vs. #5 Utah – (Houston) | W, 66–52 vs. #2 Gonzaga – (Houston) | W, 81–61 vs. #7 Michigan State – (Indianapolis) | W, 68–63 vs. #1 Wisconsin – (Indianapolis) |
| 2 | East | Virginia | | W, 56–53 vs. #15 Belmont – (Charlotte) | L, 54–60 vs. #7 Michigan State – (Charlotte) | | | | |
| 3 | Midwest | Notre Dame | | W, 69–65 vs. #14 Northeastern – (Pittsburgh) | W, 67–64 vs. #6 Butler – (Pittsburgh) | W, 81–70vs. #7 Wichita State – (Cleveland) | L, 66–68 vs. #1 Kentucky – (Cleveland) | | |
| 4 | East | Louisville | | W, 57–55 vs. #13 UC Irvine – (Seattle) | W, 71–68 vs. #5 Northern Iowa – (Seattle) | W, 75–65 vs. #8 NC State – (Syracuse) | L, 70–76 vs. #7 Michigan State – (Syracuse) | | |
| 4 | West | North Carolina | | W, 67–65 vs. #13 Harvard – (Jacksonville) | W, 87–78 vs. #5 Arkansas – (Jacksonville) | L, 72–79 vs. #1 Wisconsin – (Los Angeles) | | | |
| 8 | East | NC State | | W, 66–65 vs. #9 LSU – (Pittsburgh) | W, 71–68 vs. #1 Villanova – (Pittsburgh) | L, 65–75 vs. #4 Louisville – (Syracuse) | | | |

== Honors and awards ==
2015 ACC Men's Basketball Individual Awards
| Award | Recipient(s) |
| Player of the Year | Jahlil Okafor, C, DUKE |
| Coach of the Year | Tony Bennett, VIRGINIA |
| Defensive Player of the Year | Darion Atkins, G, VIRGINIA |
| Rookie of the Year | Jahlil Okafor, C, DUKE |

2015 ACC Men's Basketball All-Conference Teams
| First Team | Second Team | Third Team |
| Malcolm Brogdon, Jr., G, VIRGINIA †Jerian Grant, Sr., G, NOTRE DAME; Olivier Hanlan, Jr., G, BOSTON COLLEGE †Jahlil Okafor, Fr., C, DUKE; Rakeem Christmas, Sr., F, SYRACUSE | Justin Anderson, Jr., G, VIRGINIA; Quinn Cook, Sr., G, DUKE; Montrezl Harrell, Jr., F, LOUISVILLE; Trevor Lacey, Jr., G, NC STATE; Terry Rozier, So., G, LOUISVILLE | Pat Connaughton, Sr., G, NOTRE DAME; Anthony Gill, Jr., F, VIRGINIA; Brice Johnson, Jr., F, NORTH CAROLINA; Tyus Jones, Fr., G, DUKE; Marcus Paige, Jr., G, NORTH CAROLINA |
† - denotes unanimous selection
