= Harvard Crimson men's basketball statistical leaders =

The Harvard Crimson men's basketball statistical leaders are individual statistical leaders of the Harvard Crimson men's basketball program in various categories, including points, rebounds, assists, steals, and blocks. Within those areas, the lists identify single-game, single-season, and career leaders. The Crimson represent Harvard University in the NCAA's Ivy League.

Harvard began competing in intercollegiate basketball in 1900. However, the school's record book does not generally list records from before the 1950s, as records from before this period are often incomplete and inconsistent. Since scoring was much lower in this era, and teams played much fewer games during a typical season, it is likely that few or no players from this era would appear on these lists anyway.

The NCAA did not officially record assists as a stat until the 1983–84 season, and blocks and steals until the 1985–86 season, but Harvard's record books includes players in these stats before these seasons. These lists are updated through the end of the 2019–20 season.

== Scoring ==
Career
Rank	Player	Points	Seasons
1	Joe Carrabino	1,880	1980–81 1981–82 1982–83 1983–84 1984–85
2	Don Fleming	1,797	1978–79 1979–80 1980–81 1981–82
3	Tyler Rullman	1,577	1989–90 1990–91 1991–92 1992–93
4	Wesley Saunders	1,511	2011–12 2012–13 2013–14 2014–15
5	Dan Clemente	1,484	1997–98 1998–99 1999–00 2000–01
6	Jeremy Lin	1,483	2006–07 2007–08 2008–09 2009–10
7	Ralph James	1,465	1987–88 1988–89 1989–90 1990–91
8	Ron Mitchell	1,455	1988–89 1989–90 1990–91 1991–92
9	Kyle Snowden	1,429	1993–94 1994–95 1995–96 1996–97
10	Tim Hill	1,385	1995–96 1996–97 1997–98 1998–99

Season
Rank	Player	Points	Season
1	Jim Fitzsimmons	629	1971–72
2	Joe Carrabino	571	1983–84
3	Tyler Rullman	556	1992–93
4	Keith Sedlacek	538	1965–66
5	Chris Ledlum	527	2022–23
6	Don Fleming	517	1979–80
7	Joe Carrabino	514	1984–85
8	Wesley Saunders	499	2014–15
9	Don Fleming	497	1980–81
	Jeremy Lin	497	2008–09

Single game
Rank	Player	Points	Season	Opponent
1	Brady Merchant	45	2002–03	Brown
2	Bryce Aiken	44	2018–19	Columbia
3	Ralph James	41	1989–90	Penn
4	Keith Sedlacek	40	1965–66	Columbia
5	Merle McClung	39	1963–64	Dartmouth
6	Dale Dover	38	1968–69	Springfield
	Lou Silver	38	1974–75	Cincinnati
	Lou Silver	38	1974–75	Oral Roberts
	Joe Carrabino	38	1983–84	Yale
	Bryce Aiken	38	2018–19	Yale

== Rebounds ==
Career
Rank	Player	Rebounds	Seasons
1	Kyle Snowden	913	1993–94 1994–95 1995–96 1996–97
2	Ron Mitchell	803	1988–89 1989–90 1990–91 1991–92
3	Barry Williams	761	1963–64 1964–65 1965–66
4	James Brown	747	1970–71 1971–72 1972–73
5	Keith Wright	743	2008–09 2009–10 2010–11 2011–12
6	Floyd Lewis	728	1970–71 1971–72 1972–73
7	Matt Stehle	689	2002–03 2003–04 2004–05 2005–06
8	Dick Manning	682	1952–53 1953–54 1954–55
9	Tony Jenkins	673	1971–72 1972–73 1973–74
10	Steve Moundou-Missi	667	2011–12 2012–13 2013–14 2014–15

Season
Rank	Player	Rebounds	Season
1	Floyd Lewis	343	1970–71
2	Ernest Hardy	323	1969–70
3	James Brown	318	1971–72
4	Dick Manning	294	1954–55
5	Kyle Snowden	289	1995–96
6	Barry Williams	285	1965–66
7	Zena Edosomwan	276	2015–16
8	James Brown	261	1972–73
9	Tony Jenkins	255	1972–73
10	Kyle Snowden	253	1996–97

Single game
Rank	Player	Rebounds	Season	Opponent
1	Bob Canty	31	1954–55	Boston College
2	Lou Silver	26	1973–74	Yale
3	Floyd Lewis	24	1970–71	Springfield
	Floyd Lewis	24	1970–71	Yale
5	Richard Lionette	22	1952–53	Dartmouth
	Edward Cuffe	22	1959–60	Dartmouth
	Barry Williams	22	1965–66	Springfield
	Brian Newmark	22	1969–70	Boston University
9	Barry Williams	21	1965–66	Williams
	Paul Waickowski	21	1968–69	Williams
	Lewis Brown	21	1971–72	St John's
	Lewis Brown	21	1972–73	Columbia

== Assists ==
Career
Rank	Player	Assists	Seasons
1	Elliott Prasse-Freeman	705	1999–00 2000–01 2001–02 2002–03
2	Siyani Chambers	605	2012–13 2013–14 2014–15 2016–17
3	Tim Hill	590	1995–96 1996–97 1997–98 1998–99
4	Tarik Campbell	570	1989–90 1990–91 1992–93 1993–94
5	Glenn Fine	559	1975–76 1977–78 1978–79
6	Brandyn Curry	489	2009–10 2010–11 2011–12 2013–14
7	Jeremy Lin	406	2006–07 2007–08 2008–09 2009–10
8	Mike Gielen	391	1985–86 1986–87 1987–88 1988–89
9	Wesley Saunders	382	2011–12 2012–13 2013–14 2014–15

Season
Rank	Player	Assists	Season
1	Glenn Fine	207	1978–79
	Elliott Prasse-Freeman	207	2002–03
3	Elliott Prasse-Freeman	196	1999–00
4	Glenn Fine	178	1975–76
	Brandyn Curry	178	2010–11
6	Tarik Campbell	176	1990–91
7	Glenn Fine	174	1977–78
8	Tim Hill	172	1998–99
9	Siyani Chambers	171	2012–13
10	Tarik Campbell	164	1993–94
	Elliott Prasse-Freeman	164	2000–01

Single game
Rank	Player	Assists	Season	Opponent
1	Elliott Prasse-Freeman	16	2002–03	Mercer
2	Glenn Fine	15	1977–78	Detroit
	Elliott Prasse-Freeman	15	1999–00	Yale
	Elliott Prasse-Freeman	15	2000–01	Northeastern
5	Tarik Campbell	14	1990–91	Long Beach State
	Tarik Campbell	14	1993–94	Vermont
	Brandyn Curry	14	2010–11	Penn

== Steals ==
Career
Rank	Player	Steals	Seasons
1	Andrew Gellert	242	1998–99 1999–00 2000–01 2001–02
2	Jeremy Lin	225	2006–07 2007–08 2008–09 2009–10
3	Mike Gielen	213	1985–86 1986–87 1987–88 1988–89
4	Wesley Saunders	175	2011–12 2012–13 2013–14 2014–15
5	Tim Hill	168	1995–96 1996–97 1997–98 1998–99
6	Siyani Chambers	163	2012–13 2013–14 2014–15 2016–17
7	Drew Housman	157	2005–06 2006–07 2007–08 2008–09
8	Brandyn Curry	156	2009–10 2010–11 2011–12 2013–14
9	Jared Leake	150	1991–92 1992–93 1993–94 1994–95
10	Matt Stehle	142	2002–03 2003–04 2004–05 2005–06

Season
Rank	Player	Steals	Season
1	Andrew Gellert	74	1999–00
2	Andrew Gellert	72	2000–01
3	Jeremy Lin	71	2009–10
4	Jeremy Lin	68	2008–09
5	Keith Webster	66	1985–86
	Mike Gielen	66	1988–89
7	Mike Gielen	61	1987–88
8	Tim Hill	60	1998–99
9	Jeremy Lin	58	2007–08
	Dan Morris	58	1994–95

Single game
Rank	Player	Steals	Season	Opponent
1	Patrick Harvey	8	2000–01	Lehigh
2	Mike Scott	7	1996–97	Yale
	Matt Stehle	7	2005–06	Penn
	Jim Goffredo	7	2006–07	Penn
	Jeremy Lin	7	2009–10	G. Washington
	Wesley Saunders	7	2014–15	Vermont
	Noah Kirkwood	7	2021–22	Iona

== Blocks ==
Career
Rank	Player	Blocks	Seasons
1	Chris Lewis	179	2016–17 2017–18 2018–19 2019–20
2	Keith Wright	149	2008–09 2009–10 2010–11 2011–12
3	Brian Cusworth	147	2002–03 2004–05 2005–06 2006–07
4	Tim Hill	128	1995–96 1996–97 1997–98 1998–99
	Steve Moundou-Missi	128	2011–12 2012–13 2013–14 2014–15
6	Kyle Casey	127	2009–10 2010–11 2011–12 2013–14
7	Bill Mohler	117	1984–85 1985–86 1986–87 1987–88
8	Matt Stehle	111	2002–03 2003–04 2004–05 2005–06
9	Zena Edosomwan	107	2013–14 2014–15 2015–16 2016–17
10	Justice Ajogbor	97	2021–22 2022–23 2023–24
	Thomas Batties III	97	2023–24 2024–25 2025–26

Season
Rank	Player	Blocks	Season
1	Chris Grancio	67	1996–97
2	Tim Hill	65	1996–97
3	Brian Banks	59	1977–78
	Kenyatta Smith	59	2012–13
5	Justice Ajogbor	58	2023–24
6	Keith Wright	54	2010–11
7	Mike Scott	52	1996–97
	Chris Lewis	52	2018–19
9	Bill Mohler	50	1987–88
	Tim Hill	50	1998–99

Single game
Rank	Player	Blocks	Season	Opponent
1	Kenyatta Smith	10	2012–13	Penn
2	Brian Banks	7	1977–78	Detroit
3	Brian Banks	6	1977–78	Bentley
	Bill Ewing	6	1998–99	Sacred Heart
	Brian Cusworth	6	2006–07	C. Conn. St.
	Keith Wright	6	2010–11	Princeton
	Keith Wright	6	2011–12	Monmouth
	Steve Moundou-Missi	6	2012–13	Columbia
	Kenyatta Smith	6	2012–13	Princeton
	Evan Cummins	6	2015–16	TCU
	Zena Edosomwan	6	2016–17	Columbia
	Justice Ajogbor	6	2023–24	Columbia
	Thomas Batties	6	2024–25	Iona
