= Brandon Miller (basketball, born 1979) =

American basketball coach (born 1979)

Biographical details
- Born: May 21, 1979 (age 47); New Castle, Indiana, U.S.

Playing career
- 1998–1999: Southwest Missouri State
- 2000–2003: Butler
- Position: Point guard

Coaching career (HC unless noted)
- 2007–2008: Butler (asst.)
- 2008–2011: Ohio State (asst.)
- 2012–2013: Illinois (special asst.)
- 2013–2014: Butler

Head coaching record
- Overall: 14–17 (.452)

Accomplishments and honors

Awards
- As a player: Chip Hilton Player of the Year (2003); All-Horizon League Team (2003); All-Horizon League Defensive team (2003)

Brandon Miller (born May 21, 1979) is an American basketball coach, who previously played college basketball at Southwest Missouri State and Butler. Miller served as Butler's head coach for one season in 2013–14 before requesting a medical leave of absence in October 2014. On January 2, 2015, Butler University announced that Miller would not be returning following his university-approved medical leave and that interim coach Chris Holtmann had been named the Bulldogs head coach.

Born in New Castle, Indiana, Miller played point guard for New Castle Chrysler High School before beginning his college career at Southwest Missouri State. When head coach Steve Alford left after Miller's freshman year, he transferred to Butler. He started all 97 games over the next three years, finishing in the school's all-time top five in both made 3-point field goals and assists. During Miller's time at Butler, the team won three NCAA tournament games. Miller was named to multiple honorary teams for both his play and his academics. He won the Horizon League's highest individual honor, the Cecil M. Coleman Medal of Honor, and the 2003 Chip Hilton Award, given annual to the player who best exemplifies the values taught by the Chip Hilton literary character – leadership, character, and talent on and off the court.

After college, Miller entered into coaching as a video coordinator at Xavier. Subsequently, he held assistant coaching positions at Butler and then Ohio State before quitting basketball after the 2010–11 season to spend more time with his family. After a year, he returned to coaching as a special assistant to the head coach at Illinois. In April 2013, Miller rejoined the Butler staff as an assistant coach under Brad Stevens. When Stevens left to coach the Boston Celtics in July, Miller was promoted to head coach.

== Early life ==
Brandon Miller was born May 21, 1979, in New Castle, Indiana to Roger and Terry Miller. He has an older brother, Scott, and a younger sister, Lindsey. As a kid, he was always fiercely competitive. Whether playing checkers with his grandfather or Nintendo with his friends he expected to win, and when he did not he demanded a rematch. Childhood friend and future teammate Darnell Archey recalled "I’d have to drop the [Nintendo] controller and run out of the room after I won" or the game would never end. Miller was frequently injured as a child, usually from going "full tilt" in sports. At age four or five, he crashed his bike into a neighbor's house. In youth football, he broke his arm playing quarterback, then re-broke it diving for a loose ball in basketball. In junior high, he ran into a basket support while practicing baton exchanges, badly bloodying his face.

Miller grew up with basketball. His father, Roger Miller, was a teacher and assistant basketball coach at New Castle Chrysler High School. Brandon Miller's own pursuit of basketball was described by those who knew him as "relentless". At age eight, he was doing box jumps when he fell and injured himself seriously enough to go to the emergency room. The next day, he was eager to resume his training. "That sort of thing is why some people think he’s a little bit crazy", says his father. By age nine, Miller was doing agility drills, situps, and pushups on a regular basis. He was given a key to New Castle Fieldhouse – the nation's largest high school arena – and would often practice shooting by himself until 10 or 11 pm. Roger Miller was offered the opportunity to be a head coach elsewhere, but declined because the family did not want to leave New Castle.

The 1994–95 New Castle Chrysler basketball team was loaded with returning juniors and seniors. No sophomores made the varsity team, but Brandon Miller did as a Freshman. That year, New Castle beat Alexandria in the opening round of the Semi-state playoffs with the help of Scott and Brandon Miller. The younger Miller later described it as one of his all-time favorite games. New Castle fell to Ben Davis in the finals of the Semi-states, one game away from the Final Four.

The following season, Brandon Miller became the starting point guard. New Castle returned to the Semi-states, falling to Ben Davis in the semi-final round. Miller scored a team-high 17 points in the loss. During Miller's junior year, New Castle achieved a 21–1 record and number 2 ranking entering the sectional playoffs. Miller scored a game highs of 20 and 17 points as he led his team to a sectional title. New Castle advanced through the regionals before being upset by Franklin in the Semi-states. Miller was selected to the All-State team as a high honorable mention. He was chosen as a member of the Junior All-Star squad.

As a senior, Miller tore a ligament in his knee. Knowing he could not damage it further, he continued to play on the injured knee through the playoffs. Due to a change in the playoff format, New Castle met top ranked Anderson in the sectionals, instead of avoiding them to the Semi-states. New Castle led through three quarters but ultimately lost a close game in which Miller was held to eight points. For the year, Miller shot 48 percent from the field and 73 percent on free throws. He was selected to the All-State team as a high honorable mention, and to the Herald-Times's All-State Second Team.

Miller ended his high school career with 1,066 points scored, a 60–11 record as a starter, and three semi-state appearances. He became the first New Castler player to win two North Central Conference championships. Steve Bennett, who was the head coach during Miller's senior year, remarked, "When he walked into the huddle, you were confident ... Brandon had a championship attitude. There aren’t that many guys you can say that about." Miller graduated 12th in his class of 260.

== College ==
Out of high school, Miller was recruited to play college basketball by his childhood idol, and New Castle basketball legend, Steve Alford. He signed with Alford's Southwest Missouri State Bears, joining the team for the 1998–99 season. Miller averaged 11 minutes a game and the Bears advanced to the Sweet 16 of the 1999 NCAA tournament. After the season, Alford left Southwest Missouri State to take the head coaching job at Iowa. With Alford gone, Miller decided to transfer to Butler to be closer to home. There, he was reunited with high school teammate Darnell Archey. Alford later said not offering Miller an Iowa scholarship was one of the biggest mistakes of his coaching career.

After sitting out a year due to NCAA regulations regarding transfer students, Miller became the Butler Bulldogs' starting point guard for the 2000-01 season. Miller injured his shoulder in November 2000, but did not miss a game, playing through the injury all year. Butler won the Horizon League regular season title and made the 2001 NCAA tournament as a 10th seed. Powered by strong play from Miller and fellow guards Thomas Jackson and LaVall Jordan, Butler built a 33-point lead over Wake Forest by halftime and cruised to a 79–63 victory. Miller scored a team-high 18 points in what was Butler's first NCAA Tournament win since 1962. Two days later, 2nd-seeded Arizona limited Miller to four points as Butler's season ended in a 73–52 loss. During the off-season, Miller had surgery to fix his shoulder.

The following season, Miller led Butler to a 25–5 record and the Horizon League regular-season title. However, the team was "snubbed" by the selection committee and ending up playing in the 2002 NIT. Miller made the District V All-Academic Team, the Horizon League Academic All-Conference team, and the Horizon League Academic Honor Roll.

During his senior season, Miller led the Bulldogs in both scoring and assists. Butler won the Horizon League regular-season title for the third straight year. Miller was sick during the Horizon League tournament, scoring just four points as Butler fell in the championship game. It looked as though Butler might miss the 2003 NCAA tournament for the second straight year, but they were granted an at-large selection as a 12th seed. In the team's opening-round game, Butler upset 5th-seeded Mississippi State despite "an overwhelmingly partisan Mississippi State crowd". With Butler trailing 46–45 and 26 seconds left on the clock, Miller pulled down a rebound and set up Butler's offense. He got the ball back off a screen and hit a 10-foot floater, driving into the lane with 6.2 seconds left in the game. "To hit a shot like that in the NCAA tournament, nothing compares to it," he remarked. "It's something you dream about when you're a kid. It's something you dream about when you're 23." Sports Illustrated called the game an "instant tourney classic" thanks to Miller's shot. He finished with a team-high 14 points. It was Miller's fourth final-minute go-ahead basket of the season.

Butler proceeded to upset 4th-seeded Louisville 79–71, making the Sweet 16 for the first time since 1962. Miller did not score against Louisville, but was instrumental in breaking down their pressure defense and getting Archey, who hit eight 3-pointers, open looks. He also drew two charges on defense. "Brandon was just so terrific," said Butler coach Todd Lickliter. "He was just so tough." Their surprising success made Butler the media darlings of the tournament. ESPN's Pat Forde described Archey and Miller as a "fundamentally flawless starting backcourt", ascribing much of Butler's success to the duo's play. Butler subsequently lost to 1st-seeded Oklahoma, finishing the season with a school record 27 wins.

Miller was named as a co-recipient of Butler's "Most Outstanding Male Athlete" award for his senior performance, and won the Horizon League's highest individual honor – the "Cecil M. Coleman Medal of Honor". He made both the All-Horizon League and All-Horizon League Defensive teams. He was named to the District V All-Academic team, and won the 2003 Chip Hilton Award for demonstrating strong leadership, character, and talent both on and off the court. Of the latter award, journalist David Woods remarked that it was fitting because "in the clutch, [Miler] was Chip Hilton right out of a Clair Bee novel." Miller graduated in 2003 with a bachelor's degree in education.

Miller started all 97 games Butler played during his three seasons there, averaging double figures in scoring each year. He scored 1121 points, made 189 three-point field goals, and compiled 305 assists, despite having three different coaches over his three years at Butler. He is one of eight Butler players to score over 1,000 points in just three seasons. Miller finished his career in second place on the school's all-time rankings for made 3-pointers, and fifth place in assists. As of 2013, he still ranks in the top 10 in both categories. He led the Bulldogs to a 77–20 record during his tenure.

As a player, Miller was known for his unconventional style. He would often drive to the basket, seemingly out of control, and put up one-handed shots high off the backboard. Other times, he would stare down his defender as if he was about to penetrate, only to launch a quick three-pointer instead. In February 2006, Miller was named to Butler's "Team of the Sesquicentennial", an honorary team of the university's 15 all-time greatest players, marking the school's 150th anniversary.

== Coaching career ==
Miller began his coaching career as a video intern at Xavier for the 2003–04 season. Xavier's coach, Thad Matta, was hired by Ohio State the following year and brought Miller along, naming him the Director of Basketball Operations. After two seasons in the position, Miller became the team's Video Coordinator for the 2006–07 season. In April 2007, he left Ohio State to join the Butler staff as an assistant coach. According to Matta, Miller "was crucial to the early success we experienced at Ohio State".

At Butler, Miller was involved in recruiting, game preparation, player instruction, and on-court coaching. During his first year there, the team won the Horizon League title and an NCAA tournament game. At the end of the season at Butler, Miller returned to Ohio State as an assistant coach, assuming duties similar to those he performed at Butler. He spent the next three seasons working under Matta before quitting after the 2010–11 season. Missing family vacations and his son Mason's T-ball games had been weighing on Miller when he had an "aha moment" during a retirement party for his father. Recalling how his father had passed up opportunities for advancement, Miller knew he needed to adjust his priorities. "[Coaching is] a job that can become all-consuming. It's a job that the time and the effort, and even more than that, where your mind is at on a day-to-day basis, puts you in a position where you can struggle in terms of finding the balance that you need", said Miller explaining his decision to resign. "I look at my life and the first thing that I want to accomplish when it's all said and done is I want to be a very good husband and I want to be a terrific father." Later, he described quitting as one of the best decisions of his career. "I think it gave me perspective on how I was going to coach in the future", he explained. "I learned a lot from it." Matta was surprised by the decision, saying "He's one of those guys you can't really visualize not being a coach." During Miller's time at Ohio State, the team won two Big Ten titles and went to two Sweet 16s.

Miller got a sales job at Forest Pharmaceuticals. He enjoyed the job, but after nine months started to miss basketball. After a year off, Miller returned to coaching as a special assistant to Illinois head coach John Groce. In April 2013, Miller rejoined the Butler staff as an assistant coach under Brad Stevens.

=== Head coach ===
After Stevens left Butler to coach the Boston Celtics, Miller was promoted to head coach on July 6, 2013. Athletic director Barry Collier said Miller was his first thought when Stevens left. After interviewing Miller, Collier had a gut feeling he was the right man for the job, a feeling that did not change after he interviewed other candidates and weighed the decision. He remarked, "As a player, assistant coach, and person, Brandon has exemplified The Butler Way and brings a blend of energy, talent and integrity to this role. With Brandon's leadership, Butler is well positioned to expand upon the success of the last few years." Miller called it a childhood dream come true, and said he had no plans to change the team's core values. "The same goals we had a week ago are still our goals today", he remarked. He retained Butler's other assistant coaches – Michael Lewis and Terry Johnson – on his staff.

Reaction to the promotion of Miller was favorable. Jeff Goodman of ESPN predicted Miller would succeed because he is smart and "shares many of the same values and character traits" of past Butler coaches. Matt Norlander of CBS Sports said Miller was the "right guy" for the job, but said Butler was facing "huge challenges in the coming years." Indianapolis Star reporter Bob Kravitz said the hire was exactly what one would expect from Butler and that it was "impossible" and "foolish" to argue that it was the wrong choice for the program. Speaking on behalf of the Butler players, Michael Volovic remarked "everyone is really excited to play for coach Miller."

After the announcement, Stevens called Miller "one of the best and brightest I've ever been around". According to Groce, "[Miller] was known for his high basketball IQ, leadership skills and strong character [as a player]. Those traits carried over into his coaching, and his passion and love for the game of basketball have led him back to this profession". Matta remarks "Brandon is a person I had the utmost respect for as a player and now have for as a coach."

In Miller's first season, Butler struggled to a 14–17 record (4–14 in the Big East Conference) as the team battled injuries. It would turn out to be his only season on the job. On October 1, 2014, Miller abruptly went on a leave of absence to deal with an unspecified medical issue. Butler refused to elaborate, out of respect for Miller's privacy. Assistant coach Chris Holtmann served as interim coach. On January 2, 2015, Butler University announced that Miller would not be returning following his medical leave.

== Head coaching record ==
Record table
Season	Team	Overall	Conference	Standing	Postseason
Butler Bulldogs (Big East Conference) (2013–2014)
2013–14	Butler	14–17	4–14	9th	
Butler:		14–17 (.452)	4–14 (.222)		
Total:		14–17 (.452)			

== Personal life ==
As of July 2013, Miller and his wife Holly had two young sons, Mason Allen, then age 6, and Michael David, then age 4. The couple first met in eighth grade. Off the court, Miller is described as kind and "down-to-earth". Brandon's brother-in-law, Daniel Cox, is now the head coach of basketball at New Castle High School, Miller's alma mater.

Miller's older brother, Scott, is an optometrist. His younger sister, Lindsey, is nurse practitioner.
