= Clair Bee Coach of the Year Award =

Men's college basketball coach award, 1997–2011

- Awarded for: the men's college basketball coach who demonstrated character and admirable personal qualities
- Country: United States
- Presented by: NABC

History
- First award: 1997
- Final award: 2011

The Clair Bee Coach of the Year Award honored the active men's NCAA Division I basketball coach who has made the most significant positive contributions to his sport during the preceding year. The winner reflected the character and professional qualities of Clair Bee, a Hall of Fame coach who many consider to be the best technical basketball coach in history, and a man who cared deeply about his players' well-being. The Hilton and Bee Awards were created by Chip Hilton Sports and the NCAA Foundation in 1996 as a way to promote positive character in the sport of basketball, a game upon which the legendary Bee had a great impact as a coach, administrator, innovator and teacher.

== Winners ==
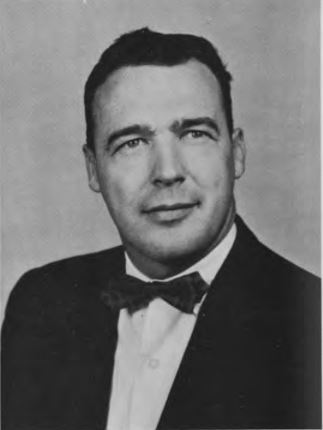
Jim Phelan, Mount St. Mary's, 1998

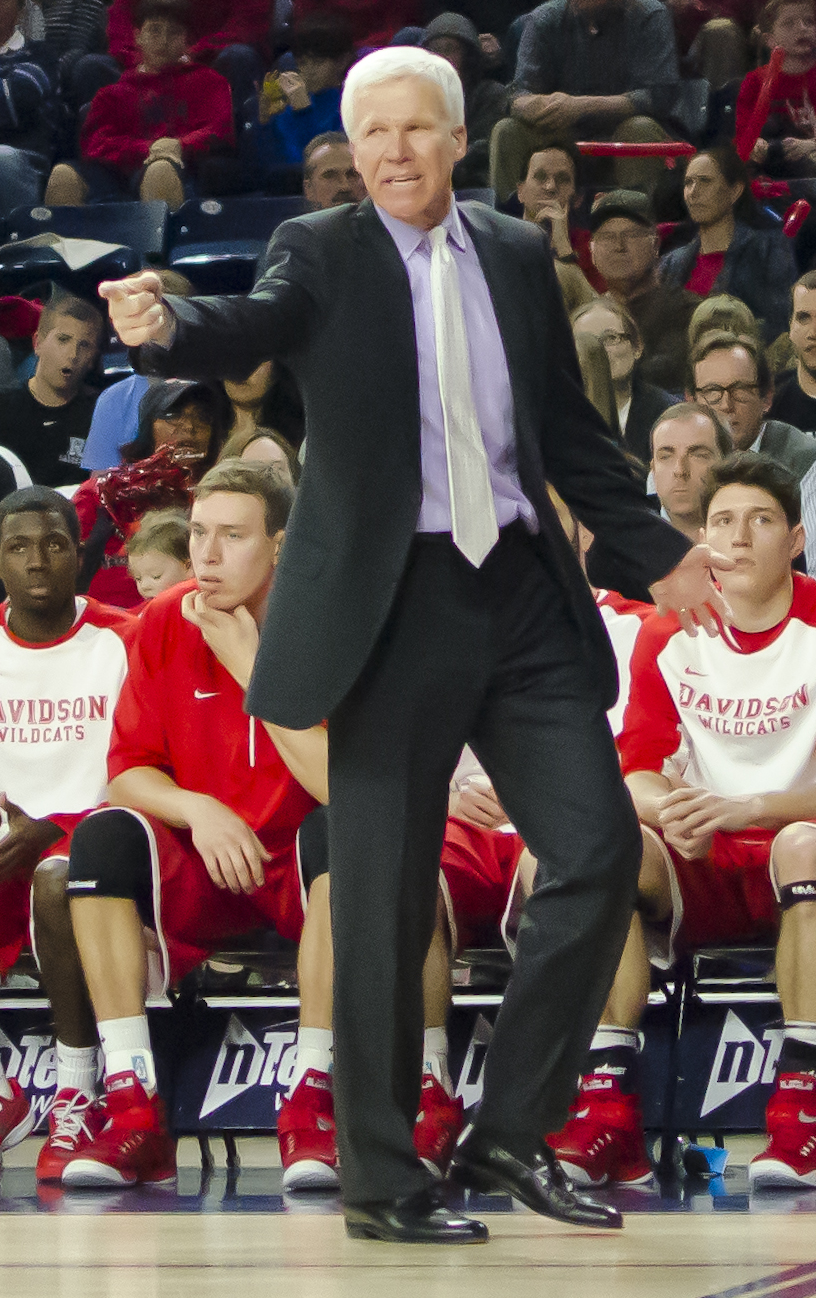
Bob McKillop, Davidson, 2008

Season	Coach	School	Reference
1996–97	Clem Haskins^{[a]}	Minnesota^{[a]}	
1997–98	Jim Phelan	Mount St. Mary's	
1998–99	Jim O'Brien	Ohio State	
1999–00	Jim Boeheim	Syracuse	
2000–01	Lute Olson	Arizona	
2001–02	Bob Knight	Texas Tech	
2002–03	Tom Crean	Marquette	
2003–04	Mike Krzyzewski	Duke	
2004–05	Tom Izzo	Michigan State	
2005–06	Jim Larrañaga	George Mason	
2006–07	Bo Ryan	Wisconsin	
2007–08	Bob McKillop	Davidson	
2008–09	Mike Anderson	Missouri	
2009–10	Steve Donahue	Cornell	
2010–11	Brad Stevens	Butler	

^{a} Clem Haskins' selection was later vacated (along with that season's win total and all other accolades) due to an academic fraud scandal that ruled the entire team ineligible.

== See also ==
- Chip Hilton Player of the Year Award – equivalent award presented to an NCAA Division I men's basketball player, sponsored by the NABC
