= 2014–15 Cornell Big Red men's basketball team =

American college basketball season

2014–15 Cornell Big Red men's basketball
- Conference: Ivy League
- Record: 13–17 (5–9 Ivy)
- Head coach: Bill Courtney (5th season)
- Assistant coaches: Marlon Sears; Mike Blaine; Jon Jaques
- Home arena: Newman Arena

2014–15 Ivy League men's basketball standings
	Conf.				Overall
Team	W		L	PCT	W		L	PCT
x-Harvard †	11	–	3	.786	22	–	8	.733
x-Yale	11	–	3	.786	22	–	10	.688
Princeton	9	–	5	.643	16	–	14	.533
Dartmouth	7	–	7	.500	14	–	15	.483
Columbia	5	–	9	.357	13	–	15	.464
Cornell	5	–	9	.357	13	–	17	.433
Penn	4	–	10	.286	9	–	19	.321
Brown	4	–	10	.286	13	–	18	.419
x – Ivy League co-champions † – NCAA participant

The 2014–15 Cornell Big Red men's basketball team represented Cornell University during the 2014–15 NCAA Division I men's basketball season. The Big Red, led by fifth-year head coach Bill Courtney, played their home games at Newman Arena and were members of the Ivy League. They finished the season 13–17, 5–9 in Ivy League play to finish in a tie for fifth place.

== Previous season ==
The Big Red had a dismal record of 2–26. Only one of those wins came against a Division I opponent.

== Offseason ==
=== Departures ===
Name	Number	Pos.	Height	Weight	Year	Hometown	Reason for departure
Dominick Scelfo	12	G	6'3"	185	Senior	Kenner, LA	Graduated
Jake Matthews	20	G	6'2"	220	Senior	Greensburg, PA	Graduated
Dwight Tarwater	33	F	6'6"	230	Senior	Knoxville, TN	Graduated
Nolan Cressler	3	G	6'4"	198	Junior	Pittsburgh, PA	Transferred to Vanderbilt

== Roster ==
Number	Name	Position	Height	Weight	Year	Hometown
0	David Onourah	Forward	6–9	230	Sophomore	Atlanta, Georgia
1	Darryl Smith	Guard	6–2	180	Sophomore	Chesapeake, Virginia
3	Galal Cancer	Guard	6–2	180	Senior	Albany, New York
4	Dave LaMore	Forward/center	6–9	225	Senior	Whitmore Lake, Michigan
5	Robert Hatter	Guard	6–2	180	Sophomore	Houston, Texas
11	Desmond Fleming	Guard	5–11	180	Sophomore	The Woodlands, Texas
12	Jordan Abdur-Ra'oof	Forward	6–7	205	Freshman	Rockville, Maryland
13	Devin Cherry	Guard	6–3	185	Senior	Meridian, Mississippi
15	Braxston Bunce	Center	6–11	250	Junior	Kelowna, Canada
20	Wil Bathurst	Guard/forward	6–3	180	Freshman	Olean, New York
21	Kyle Brown	Guard	6–2	180	Freshman	Bellevue, Washington
22	Robert Mischler	Guard	6–3	183	Junior	Mishawaka, Indiana
24	Pat Smith	Guard/forward	6–5	195	Freshman	Chalfont, Pennsylvania
25	JoJo Fallas	Guard	5–11	175	Sophomore	Los Angeles, California
32	Shonn Miller	Forward	6–7	210	Senior	Euclid, Ohio
35	Nenad Tomic	Forward	6–7	220	Senior	North Royalton, Ohio
50	Deion Giddens	Forward/center	6–9	202	Senior	Bitburg, Germany

== Schedule ==
Date time, TV	Rank^{#}	Opponent^{#}	Result	Record	Site (attendance) city, state
Regular season
11/14/2014*; 7:00 pm		at George Mason	W 68–60	1–0	Patriot Center (6,007); Fairfax, VA
11/16/2014*; 2:00 pm		at Loyola (MD)	L 71–76	1–1	Reitz Arena (1,046); Baltimore, MD
11/18/2014*; 7:00 pm		Colgate	W 58–52	2–1	Newman Arena (1,641); Ithaca, NY
11/20/2014*; 7:30 pm, ESPN3		vs. South Carolina; Charleston Classic quarterfinals	L 49–65	2–2	TD Arena (2,517); Charleston, SC
11/21/2014*; 9:00 pm, ESPN3		vs. Penn State; Charleston Classic consolation round	L 71–72	2–3	TD Arena (2,430); Charleston, SC
11/23/2014*; 1:30 pm, ESPN3		vs. Drexel; Charleston Classic 7th place game	L 59–61	2–4	TD Arena (1,220); Charleston, SC
11/26/2014*; 7:00 pm		Canisius	W 67–60	3–4	Newman Arena (750); Ithaca, NY
11/29/2014*; 2:00 pm		at Binghamton	W 68–54	4–4	Binghamton University Events Center (1,950); Vestal, NY
12/06/2014*; 4:00 pm		UMass Lowell	W 71–60	5–4	Newman Arena (659); Ithaca, NY
12/21/2014*; 2:00 pm		at Radford	L 61–74	5–5	Dedmon Center (754); Radford, VA
12/23/2014*; 7:00 pm, TWCSC		at Siena	W 75–57	6–5	Times Union Center (5,973); Albany, NY
12/28/2014*; 4:00 pm		Saint Peter's	L 52–59 ^{OT}	6–6	Newman Arena (847); Ithaca, NY
12/31/2014*; 6:00 pm, ESPNU		at Syracuse	L 44–61	6–7	Carrier Dome (19,288); Syracuse, NY
01/03/2015*; 3:00 pm, ESPN3		at Buffalo	L 73–92	6–8	Alumni Arena (3,192); Buffalo, NY
01/08/2015*; 7:00 pm		Howard	W 70–60	7–8	Newman Arena (1,142); Ithaca, NY
01/10/2015*; 2:00 pm		Alfred State	W 107–29	8–8	Newman Arena (1,961); Ithaca, NY
01/17/2015; 4:30 pm		Columbia	L 45–48	8–9 (0–1)	Newman Arena (3,222); Ithaca, NY
01/24/2015; 7:00 pm		at Columbia	W 57–47	9–9 (1–1)	Levien Gymnasium (2,718); New York City, NY
01/30/2015; 7:00 pm		Brown	W 57–49	10–9 (2–1)	Newman Arena (2,712); Ithaca, NY
01/31/2015; 6:00 pm		Yale	L 57–65	10–10 (2–2)	Newman Arena (3,119); Ithaca, NY
02/06/2015; 7:00 pm, ASN		Penn	L 69–71	10–11 (2–3)	Newman Arena (2,713); Ithaca, NY
02/07/2015; 6:00 pm		Princeton	W 68–60	11–11 (3–3)	Newman Arena (2,889); Ithaca, NY
02/13/2015; 7:00 pm		at Dartmouth	W 81–72 ^{OT}	12–11 (4–3)	Leede Arena (548); Hanover, NH
02/14/2015; 6:00 pm		at Harvard	L 40–61	12–12 (4–4)	Lavietes Pavilion (1,603); Cambridge, MA
02/20/2015; 7:00 pm		at Yale	L 51–62	12–13 (4–5)	John J. Lee Amphitheater (1,359); New Haven, CT
02/21/2015; 6:00 pm		at Brown	L 56–57	12–14 (4–6)	Pizzitola Sports Center (562); Providence, RI
02/27/2015; 7:00 pm, CBSSN		Harvard	W 57–49	13–14 (5–6)	Newman Arena (3,208); Ithaca, NY
02/28/2015; 6:00 pm		Dartmouth	L 45–56	13–15 (5–7)	Newman Arena (2,659); Ithaca, NY
03/06/2015; 7:00 pm		at Princeton	L 53–66	13–16 (5–8)	Jadwin Gymnasium (1,843); Princeton, NJ
03/07/2015; 7:00 pm		at Penn	L 72–79	13–17 (5–9)	Palestra (2,029); Philadelphia, PA
*Non-conference game. ^{#}Rankings from AP Poll. (#) Tournament seedings in parentheses. All times are in Eastern Time.
