= 2014–15 Dartmouth Big Green men's basketball team =

American college basketball season

2014–15 Dartmouth Big Green men's basketball

CIT, First round
- Conference: Ivy League
- Record: 14–15 (7–7 Ivy)
- Head coach: Paul Cormier (5th season)
- Assistant coaches: Jean Bain; Jordan Watson; James Cormier
- Home arena: Leede Arena

2014–15 Ivy League men's basketball standings
	Conf.				Overall
Team	W		L	PCT	W		L	PCT
x-Harvard †	11	–	3	.786	22	–	8	.733
x-Yale	11	–	3	.786	22	–	10	.688
Princeton	9	–	5	.643	16	–	14	.533
Dartmouth	7	–	7	.500	14	–	15	.483
Columbia	5	–	9	.357	13	–	15	.464
Cornell	5	–	9	.357	13	–	17	.433
Penn	4	–	10	.286	9	–	19	.321
Brown	4	–	10	.286	13	–	18	.419
x – Ivy League co-champions † – NCAA participant

The 2014–15 Dartmouth Big Green men's basketball team represented Dartmouth College during the 2014–15 NCAA Division I men's basketball season. The Big Green, led by fifth year head coach Paul Cormier, played their home games at Leede Arena and were members of the Ivy League. They finished the season 14–15, 7–7 in Ivy League play to finish in fourth place. They were invited to the CollegeInsider.com Tournament, their first postseason appearance since 1959, where they lost in the first round to Canisius.

== Roster ==
Number	Name	Position	Height	Weight	Year	Hometown
0	Tommy Carpenter	Forward	6–7	200	Junior	Greensboro, North Carolina
1	Cameron Smith	Forward	6–1	175	Freshman	Bristow, Virginia
2	Ikemefuna Ngwudo	Forward	6–6	200	Sophomore	Baldwin, New York
3	Connor Boehm	Forward	6–7	235	Junior	Winnetka, Illinois
4	Taylor Johnson	Guard	6–4	180	Freshman	Aledo, Texas
5	Matt Rennie	Forward	6–8	220	Junior	North Brunswick, New Jersey
10	Malik Gill	Guard	5–9	185	Junior	New Rochelle, New York
11	Alex Mitola	Guard	5–11	170	Junior	Florham Park, New Jersey
12	Gabas Maldunas	Forward/Center	6–9	230	Senior	Panevėžys, Lithuania
15	Kevin Crescenzi	Guard	6–3	190	Junior	North Palm Beach, Florida
20	Quinten Payne	Guard	6–5	190	Sophomore	St. Charles, Illinois
21	Wesley Dickinson	Forward	6–7	220	Sophomore	Bergenfield, New Jersey
22	Miles Wright	Guard	6–4	205	Freshman	Boston, Massachusetts
23	John Golden	Guard/Forward	6–6	200	Senior	Freehold Township, New Jersey
24	Alex Wolf	Forward	6–10	240	Freshman	Greenwich, Connecticut
25	Brandon McDonnell	Forward	6–8	210	Junior	Jackson, New Jersey
33	Eli Harrison	Forward	6–6	190	Sophomore	Sisters, Oregon
44	Cole Harrison	Center	6–10	235	Sophomore	Brentwood, Tennessee

== Schedule ==
Date time, TV	Opponent	Result	Record	Site (attendance) city, state
Regular season
11/14/2014*; 7:00 pm	at St. Bonaventure	L 57–77	0–1	Reilly Center (3,837); Olean, NY
11/19/2014*; 7:00 pm	at Hartford	L 48–53	0–2	Chase Arena at Reich Family Pavilion (1,505); Hartford, CT
11/28/2014*; 3:00 pm	IPFW	W 68–67	1–2	Leede Arena (1,261); Hanover, NH
11/30/2014*; 3:00 pm	New Hampshire; Rivalry	L 63–65	1–3	Leede Arena (697); Hanover, NH
12/03/2014*; 7:00 pm	at Longwood	L 73–74	1–4	Willett Hall (1,524); Farmville, VA
12/06/2014*; 3:00 pm	Maine	W 74–51	2–4	Leede Arena (631); Hanover, NH
12/10/2014*; 8:00 pm	at UMass Lowell	W 69–48	3–4	Costello Athletic Center (732); Lowell, MA
12/14/2014*; 2:00 pm	at Jacksonville State	L 67–79	3–5	Pete Mathews Coliseum (3,312); Jacksonville, AL
12/16/2014*; 7:00 pm, ESPN3	at Mercer	W 67–51	4–5	Hawkins Arena (2,430); Macon, GA
12/19/2014*; 7:00 pm	Northern Illinois	W 58–55	5–5	Leede Arena (701); Hanover, NH
12/22/2014*; 4:00 pm	at Penn State	L 49–69	5–6	Bryce Jordan Center (6,127); University Park, PA
12/31/2014*; 1:00 pm	at Bryant	W 76–59	6–6	Chace Athletic Center (804); Smithfield, RI
01/10/2015; 7:00 pm	Harvard	L 46–57	6–7 (0–1)	Leede Arena (1,867); Hanover, NH
01/14/2015*; 7:00 pm	at Vermont	L 52–55	6–8	Patrick Gym (2,175); Burlington, VT
01/17/2015*; 3:00 pm	NJIT	W 62–53	7–8	Leede Arena (775); Hanover, NH
01/24/2015; 2:00 pm	at Harvard	W 70–61	8–8 (1–1)	Lavietes Pavilion (2,195); Cambridge, MA
01/30/2015; 7:00 pm, ESPN3	at Penn	L 51–58	8–9 (1–2)	Palestra (2,107); Philadelphia, PA
01/31/2015; 6:00 pm	at Princeton	L 53–64	8–10 (1–3)	Jadwin Gymnasium (2,615); Princeton, NJ
02/06/2015; 7:00 pm, CBSSN	at Yale	L 66–81	8–11 (1–4)	John J. Lee Amphitheater (1,872); New Haven, CT
02/07/2015; 7:00 pm	at Brown	L 64–67	8–12 (1–5)	Pizzitola Sports Center (907); Providence, RI
02/13/2015; 7:00 pm	Cornell	L 72–81 ^{OT}	8–13 (1–6)	Leede Arena (548); Hanover, NH
02/14/2015; 7:00 pm	Columbia	W 61–49	9–13 (2–6)	Leede Arena (631); Hanover, NH
02/20/2015; 7:00 pm	Princeton	L 56–63	9–14 (2–7)	Leede Arena (1,112); Hanover, NH
02/21/2015; 7:00 pm	Penn	W 67–62	10–14 (3–7)	Leede Arena (893); Hanover, NH
02/27/2015; 7:00 pm, ASN	at Columbia	W 84–71	11–14 (4–7)	Levien Gymnasium (1,677); New York City, NY
02/28/2015; 6:00 pm	at Cornell	W 56–45	12–14 (5–7)	Newman Arena (2,659); Ithaca, NY
03/06/2015; 7:00 pm	Brown	W 75–69	13–14 (6–7)	Leede Arena (652); Hanover, NH
03/07/2015; 7:00 pm	Yale	W 59–58	14–14 (6–7)	Leede Arena (1,227); Hanover, NH
CIT
03/18/2015*; 7:00 pm	at Canisius; First round	L 72–87	14–15	Koessler Athletic Center (806); Buffalo, NY
*Non-conference game. ^{#}Rankings from AP Poll. (#) Tournament seedings in parentheses. All times are in Eastern Time.
