= 2014–15 Harvard Crimson men's basketball team =

American college basketball season

2014–15 Harvard Crimson men's basketball

Ivy League regular season co–champions

One-game playoff vs. Yale, W 53–51

NCAA tournament, Round of 64
- Conference: Ivy League
- Record: 22–8 (11–3 Ivy)
- Head coach: Tommy Amaker (8th season)
- Assistant coaches: Brian DeStefano; Brian Eskildsen; Christian Webster
- Home arena: Lavietes Pavilion

2014–15 Ivy League men's basketball standings
	Conf.				Overall
Team	W		L	PCT	W		L	PCT
x-Harvard †	11	–	3	.786	22	–	8	.733
x-Yale	11	–	3	.786	22	–	10	.688
Princeton	9	–	5	.643	16	–	14	.533
Dartmouth	7	–	7	.500	14	–	15	.483
Columbia	5	–	9	.357	13	–	15	.464
Cornell	5	–	9	.357	13	–	17	.433
Penn	4	–	10	.286	9	–	19	.321
Brown	4	–	10	.286	13	–	18	.419
x – Ivy League co-champions † – NCAA participant

The 2014–15 Harvard Crimson men's basketball team represented Harvard University during the 2014–15 NCAA Division I men's basketball season. The Crimson, led by eighth year head coach Tommy Amaker, played their home games at Lavietes Pavilion and were members of the Ivy League. They finished the season 22–8, 11–3 in Ivy League play to share to the regular season Ivy League title with Yale. They earned the Ivy League's automatic bid to the NCAA tournament after defeating Yale in a One-game playoff, the ninth one-game playoff tie breaker in Ivy League history. In the NCAA Tournament, the Crimson lost to North Carolina in the second round.

== Recruits ==
=== Class of 2014 ===
College recruiting information
Name	Hometown	School	Height	Weight	Commit date
Chris Egi; C/PF	Montverde, FL	Montverde Academy (FL)	6 ft 9 in (2.06 m)	215 lb (98 kg)	Sep 29, 2013
Chris Egi; C/PF	Recruit ratings: Scout: Rivals: (80)				
Andre Chatfield; SG	Norcross, GA	Norcross High School (GA)	6 ft 5 in (1.96 m)	175 lb (79 kg)	Sep 29, 2013
Andre Chatfield; SG	Recruit ratings: Scout: Rivals: (76)				
Overall recruit ranking:
Note: In many cases, Scout, Rivals, 247Sports, On3, and ESPN may conflict in their listings of height and weight.; In these cases, the average was taken. ESPN grades are on a 100-point scale.; Sources: "Harvard 2014 Basketball Commitments". Rivals.; "2013 Harvard Basketball Commits". Scout.; "ESPN Recruiting Nation Basketball". ESPN.; "Scout.com Team Recruiting Rankings". Scout.; "2014 Team Ranking". Rivals.

=== Class of 2015 ===
College recruiting information
Name	Hometown	School	Height	Weight	Commit date
Tommy McCarthy; PG	Carlsbad, CA	La Costa Canyon High School	6 ft 0 in (1.83 m)	155 lb (70 kg)	Oct 2, 2014
Tommy McCarthy; PG	Recruit ratings: Scout: Rivals: (69)				
Weisner Perez; SF	Morton, IL	Morton High School	6 ft 6 in (1.98 m)	205 lb (93 kg)	Sep 26, 2014
Weisner Perez; SF	Recruit ratings: Scout: Rivals: (NR)				
Overall recruit ranking:
Note: In many cases, Scout, Rivals, 247Sports, On3, and ESPN may conflict in their listings of height and weight.; In these cases, the average was taken. ESPN grades are on a 100-point scale.; Sources: "Harvard 2015 Basketball Commitments". Rivals.; "2015 Harvard Basketball Commits". Scout.; "ESPN Recruiting Nation Basketball". ESPN.; "Scout.com Team Recruiting Rankings". Scout.; "2015 Team Ranking". Rivals.

== Roster ==
2014–15 Harvard Crimson men's basketball team
Players
Coaches

Pos.	#	Name	Height	Weight	Year	Hometown
G	1	Siyani Chambers (C)	6 ft 0 in (1.83 m)	170 lb (77 kg)	Jr	Golden Valley, Minnesota
G	2	Alex Nesbitt	6 ft 1 in (1.85 m)	175 lb (79 kg)	Sr	Chicago, Illinois
G	3	Matt Brown	6 ft 3 in (1.91 m)	205 lb (93 kg)	Sr	Barrington, Rhode Island
F	4	Zena Edosomwan	6 ft 9 in (2.06 m)	245 lb (111 kg)	So	Los Angeles, California
G/F	10	Patrick Steeves	6 ft 7 in (2.01 m)	220 lb (100 kg)	So	Montreal, Quebec
F	11	Chris Egi	6 ft 9 in (2.06 m)	215 lb (98 kg)	Fr	Markham, Ontario
G	12	Matt Fraschilla	6 ft 0 in (1.83 m)	165 lb (75 kg)	So	Dallas, Texas
F	14	Steve Moundou-Missi (C)	6 ft 7 in (2.01 m)	225 lb (102 kg)	Sr	Yaoundé, Cameroon
G	15	Corbin Miller	6 ft 2 in (1.88 m)	180 lb (82 kg)	So	Sandy, Utah
G	21	Zach Yoshor	6 ft 6 in (1.98 m)	205 lb (93 kg)	Fr	Houston, Texas
G/F	23	Wesley Saunders	6 ft 5 in (1.96 m)	215 lb (98 kg)	Sr	Los Angeles, California
F	24	Jonah Travis	6 ft 6 in (1.98 m)	225 lb (102 kg)	Sr	Minneapolis, Minnesota
C	25	Kenyatta Smith	6 ft 8 in (2.03 m)	245 lb (111 kg)	Sr	Sun Valley, California
F	32	Charlie Anastasi	6 ft 6 in (1.98 m)	225 lb (102 kg)	Sr	Washington Crossing, Pennsylvania
F	33	Evan Cummins	6 ft 8 in (2.03 m)	215 lb (98 kg)	Jr	Westborough, Massachusetts
G/F	35	Agunwa Okolie	6 ft 8 in (2.03 m)	205 lb (93 kg)	Jr	Ajax, Ontario

Head coach

- Tommy Amaker (Duke)

Assistant coach(es)

- Brian DeStefano (Duke)
- Brian Eskildsen (Tennessee)
- Christian Webster (Harvard)

Legend

- (C) Team captain
- (S) Suspended
- (I) Ineligible
- (W) Walk-on
- Injured
- Current redshirt

Roster
Last update: 2014-10-03

== Preseason ==
Harvard was again the unanimous preseason top team in the Ivy League media poll. The team entered the season ranked 25th in the AP Poll.

== Schedule ==
In the penultimate game of the regular season on March 6, the team lost to Yale, falling behind them by a game in the standings with one game to play. However, the teams finished the season tied for the Ivy League title and Harvard won the one-game playoff on March 14 to earn the conference's automatic bid to the NCAA tournament. The 2014–15 team was the first Ivy League team to make a fifth consecutive postseason appearance since the 2001–02 Princeton Tigers men's basketball team completed a seven-year run for Princeton. They were the third Ivy team to make four consecutive NCAA basketball tournament appearances, a feat last accomplished by the 1991–92 Princeton Tigers men's basketball team. On March 19 in the 2015 NCAA tournament the team overcame a 16-point second half deficit against fourth-seeded North Carolina to take the lead before surrendering it in the final minute of play.

Date time, TV	Rank^{#}	Opponent^{#}	Result	Record	Site (attendance) city, state
Regular season
11/14/2014*; 7:00 pm	No. 25	MIT	W 73–52	1–0	Lavietes Pavilion (1,941); Cambridge, MA
11/16/2014*; 5:30 pm, NESN	No. 25	vs. Holy Cross; Coaches vs. Cancer Classic Tip-Off	L 57–58	1–1	TD Garden (N/A); Boston, MA
11/20/2014*; 8:00 pm, ASN		Florida Atlantic	W 71–49	2–1	Lavietes Pavilion (1,343); Cambridge, MA
11/25/2014*; 7:00 pm		Houston	W 84–63	3–1	Lavietes Pavilion (1,423); Cambridge, MA
11/29/2014*; 2:00 pm, ESPN3		Massachusetts	W 75–73	4–1	Lavietes Pavilion (2,195); Cambridge, MA
12/03/2014*; 7:00 pm, NESN		Northeastern	W 60–46	5–1	Lavietes Pavilion (1,553); Cambridge, MA
12/06/2014*; 7:00 pm		at Vermont	W 64–52 ^{2OT}	6–1	Patrick Gym (2,628); Burlington, VT
12/08/2014*; 7:00 pm		Boston University	W 70–56	7–1	Lavietes Pavilion (1,311); Cambridge, MA
12/21/2014*; 12:00 pm, ESPNU		at No. 6 Virginia	L 27–76	7–2	John Paul Jones Arena (14,593); Charlottesville, VA
12/28/2014*; 2:00 pm, P12N		at Arizona State	L 46–56	7–3	Wells Fargo Arena (6,503); Tempe, AZ
12/30/2014*; 8:00 pm, ASN		at Grand Canyon	W 72–59	8–3	GCU Arena (7,412); Phoenix, AZ
01/05/2015*; 7:00 pm		Saint Rose	W 84–38	9–3	Lavietes Pavilion (1,033); Cambridge, MA
01/10/2015; 7:00 pm		at Dartmouth	W 57–46	10–3 (1–0)	Leede Arena (1,867); Hanover, NH
01/14/2015*; 7:00 pm, ESPN3		at Boston College; Rivalry	L 57–64 ^{OT}	10–4	Conte Forum (3,529); Chestnut Hill, MA
01/20/2015*; 5:30 pm		at Bryant	W 66–57	11–4	Chace Athletic Center (1,246); Smithfield, RI
01/24/2015; 2:00 pm, ESPN3		Dartmouth	L 61–70	11–5 (1–1)	Lavietes Pavilion (2,195); Cambridge, MA
01/30/2015; 6:00 pm, ESPNU		at Princeton	W 75–72	12–5 (2–1)	Jadwin Gymnasium (2,570); Princeton, NJ
01/31/2015; 7:00 pm		at Penn	W 63–38	13–5 (3–1)	Palestra (4,632); Philadelphia, PA
02/06/2015; 7:00 pm		at Brown	W 76–74 ^{OT}	14–5 (4–1)	Pizzitola Sports Center (1,567); Providence, RI
02/07/2015; 7:00 pm		at Yale	W 52–50	15–5 (5–1)	John J. Lee Amphitheater (2,532); New Haven, CT
02/13/2015; 6:30 pm, CBSSN		Columbia	W 72–68	16–5 (6–1)	Lavietes Pavilion (1,624); Cambridge, MA
02/14/2015; 4:00 pm, ESPN3		Cornell	W 61–40	17–5 (7–1)	Lavietes Pavilion (1,603); Cambridge, MA
02/20/2015; 7:00 pm, ESPN3		Penn	W 69–46	18–5 (8–1)	Lavietes Pavilion (1,295); Cambridge, MA
02/21/2015; 7:00 pm, ESPN3		Princeton	W 63–55	19–5 (9–1)	Lavietes Pavilion (2,195); Cambridge, MA
02/27/2015; 6:30 pm, CBSSN		at Cornell	L 49–57	19–6 (9–2)	Newman Arena (3,208); Ithaca, NY
02/28/2015; 7:00 pm, ESPN3		at Columbia	W 80–70	20–6 (10–2)	Levien Gymnasium (2,644); New York City, NY
03/06/2015; 8:00 pm, ASN		Yale	L 52–62	20–7 (10–3)	Lavietes Pavilion (2,195); Cambridge, MA
03/07/2015; 6:00 pm, CBSSN		Brown	W 72–62	21–7 (11–3)	Lavietes Pavilion (2,195); Cambridge, MA
Ivy League one game playoff
03/14/2015; 4:00 pm, ASN/ESPN3		vs. Yale	W 53–51	22–7	Palestra (5,256); Philadelphia, PA
NCAA tournament
03/19/2015*; 7:20 pm, TNT	(13 W)	vs. (4 W) No. 15 North Carolina; Second round	L 65–67	22–8	Veterans Memorial Arena (12,761); Jacksonville, FL
*Non-conference game. ^{#}Rankings from AP Poll,. (#) Tournament seedings in parentheses. W=West Region. All times are in Eastern Time.

== Honors ==
Wesley Saunders was First Team All-Ivy selection, while Siyani Chambers and Steve Moundou-Missi were second team selections. Moundou-Missi was the Conference Defensive Player of the Year. Saunders joined Don Flemming as the only players to have earned three consecutive first team all-league selections. Saunders was a 2014–15 Men's All-District I Team selection by the U.S. Basketball Writers Association.

== Rankings ==
Legend: ██ Increase in ranking. ██ Decrease in ranking.
Poll	Pre	Wk 2	Wk 3	Wk 4	Wk 5	Wk 6	Wk 7	Wk 8	Wk 9	Wk 10	Wk 11	Wk 12	Wk 13	Wk 14	Wk 15	Wk 16	Wk 17	Wk 18	Wk 19	Final
AP	25т													RV					RV	N/A
Coaches	RV																			
