= 2014–15 Columbia Lions men's basketball team =

American college basketball season

2014–15 Columbia Lions men's basketball
- Conference: Ivy League
- Record: 13–15 (5–9 Ivy)
- Head coach: Kyle Smith (5th season)
- Assistant coaches: Derrick Phelps; Kevin Hovde; Adam Hood
- Home arena: Levien Gymnasium

2014–15 Ivy League men's basketball standings
	Conf.				Overall
Team	W		L	PCT	W		L	PCT
x-Harvard †	11	–	3	.786	22	–	8	.733
x-Yale	11	–	3	.786	22	–	10	.688
Princeton	9	–	5	.643	16	–	14	.533
Dartmouth	7	–	7	.500	14	–	15	.483
Columbia	5	–	9	.357	13	–	15	.464
Cornell	5	–	9	.357	13	–	17	.433
Penn	4	–	10	.286	9	–	19	.321
Brown	4	–	10	.286	13	–	18	.419
x – Ivy League co-champions † – NCAA participant

The 2014–15 Columbia Lions men's basketball team represented Columbia University during the 2014–15 NCAA Division I men's basketball season. The Lions, led by fifth year head coach Kyle Smith, played their home games at Levien Gymnasium and were members of the Ivy League. They finished the season 13–15, 5–9 in Ivy League play to finish in a tie for fifth place.

== Previous season ==
The Lions finished the season 21–13, 8–6 in Ivy League play to finish in a tie for third place. They were invited to the CollegeInsdier.com Tournament where they defeated Valparaiso and Eastern Michigan to advance to the quarterfinals where they lost to fellow Ivy League member Yale.

== Roster ==
Number	Name	Position	Height	Weight	Year	Hometown
0	Kyle Castlin	Guard	6–4	180	Freshman	Marietta, Georgia
1	Jeff Coby	Forward	6–8	220	Sophomore	Pembroke Pines, Florida
2	Isaac Cohen	Guard	6–4	220	Junior	Orlando, Florida
3	Grant Mullins	Guard	6–3	175	Junior	Burlington, Canada
5	Steve Frankoski	Guard	6–2	190	Senior	Florham Park, New Jersey
11	Zach En'Wezoh	Forward	6–8	225	Junior	Kennewick, Washington
12	Maodo Lo	Guard	6–3	190	Junior	Berlin, Germany
13	Alex Rosenberg	Forward	6–7	210	Senior	Short Hills, New Jersey
14	Kendall Jackson	Guard	5–8	155	Sophomore	Union City, California
15	Nate Hickman	Guard	6–4	175	Freshman	Wilmington, Delaware
20	Paddy Quinn	Guard	6–1	190	Junior	Ramsey, New Jersey
21	Noah Springwater	Guard	6–3	180	Senior	San Francisco, California
22	Meiko Lyles	Guard	6–3	200	Senior	Nashville, Tennessee
23	Cory Osetkowski	Center	6–11	270	Senior	Rancho Santa Fe, California
32	Chris McComber	Forward	6–8	235	Sophomore	Nepean, Canada
33	Luke Petrasek	Forward	6–10	215	Sophomore	East Northport, New York
52	Conor Voss	Center	7–1	250	Sophomore	St. Cloud, Minnesota

== Schedule ==
Date time, TV	Rank^{#}	Opponent^{#}	Result	Record	Site (attendance) city, state
Regular season
11/14/2014*; 7:00 pm		at Stony Brook	L 56–57	0–1	Island Federal Credit Union Arena (4,009); Stony Brook, NY
11/18/2014*; 7:00 pm		Wagner	W 70–56	1–1	Levien Gymnasium (848); New York, NY
11/23/2014*; 2:00 pm		at Lehigh	W 54–44	2–1	Stabler Arena (768); Bethlehem, PA
11/25/2014*; 7:00 pm		Fairleigh Dickinson	W 57–47	3–1	Levien Gymnasium (770); New York City, NY
11/29/2014*; 4:00 pm		American	W 52–43	4–1	Levien Gymnasium (1,080); New York City, NY
12/02/2014*; 7:00 pm		Loyola (MD)	L 62–64	4–2	Levien Gymnasium (613); New York City, NY
12/06/2014*; 7:00 pm, ESPN3		Bucknell	W 62–39	5–2	Levien Gymnasium (1,606); New York City, NY
12/10/2014*; 7:00 pm, ESPN2		at No. 1 Kentucky	L 46–56	5–3	Rupp Arena (22,112); Lexington, KY
12/20/2014*; 7:00 pm		Hofstra	W 82–77	6–3	Levien Gymnasium (1,361); New York City, NY
12/22/2014*; 7:00 pm, SNY		at UConn	L 65–80	6–4	Webster Bank Arena (9,124); Bridgeport, CT
12/28/2014*; 7:00 pm		Colgate	W 69–64	7–4	Levien Gymnasium (1,429); New York City, NY
12/30/2014*; 7:00 pm		at St. Francis Brooklyn	L 64–72	7–5	Generoso Pope Athletic Complex (905); Brooklyn, NY
01/06/2015*; 7:00 pm		Stony Brook	L 61–70	7–6	Levien Gymnasium (822); New York City, NY
01/10/2015*; 7:00 pm		Central Pennsylvania	W 112–63	8–6	Levien Gymnasium (606); New York City, NY
01/17/2015; 4:30 pm		at Cornell	W 48–45	9–6 (1–0)	Newman Arena (3,222); Ithaca, NY
01/24/2015; 7:00 pm		Cornell	L 47–57	9–7 (1–1)	Levien Gymnasium (2,718); New York City, NY
01/30/2015; 8:00 pm, ASN		Yale	L 59–63	9–8 (1–2)	Levien Gymnasium (2,223); New York City, NY
01/31/2015; 7:00 pm		Brown	W 86–65	10–8 (2–2)	Levien Gymnasium (1,768); New York City, NY
02/06/2015; 7:00 pm, ESPN3		Princeton	L 62–74	10–9 (2–3)	Levien Gymnasium (1,812); New York City, NY
02/07/2015; 7:00 pm		Penn	W 83–56	11–9 (3–3)	Levien Gymnasium (2,590); New York City, NY
02/13/2015; 7:00 pm, CBSSN		at Harvard	L 68–72	11–10 (3–4)	Lavietes Pavilion (1,624); Cambridge, MA
02/14/2015; 7:00 pm		at Dartmouth	L 49–61	11–11 (3–5)	Leede Arena (631); Hanover, NH
02/20/2015; 8:00 pm, ASN		at Brown	W 76–59	12–11 (4–5)	Pizzitola Sports Center (760); Providence, RI
02/21/2015; 7:00 pm		at Yale	W 56–50	13–11 (5–5)	John J. Lee Amphitheater (1,936); New Haven, CT
02/27/2015; 7:00 pm, ASN		Dartmouth	L 71–84	13–12 (5–6)	Levien Gymnasium (1,677); New York City, NY
02/28/2015; 7:00 pm, ESPN3		Harvard	L 70–80	13–13 (5–7)	Levien Gymnasium (2,644); New York City, NY
03/06/2015; 7:00 pm		at Penn	L 46–54	13–14 (5–8)	Palestra (1,613); Philadelphia, PA
03/07/2015; 7:00 pm		at Princeton	L 83–85	13–15 (5–9)	Jadwin Gymnasium (2,363); Princeton, NJ
*Non-conference game. ^{#}Rankings from AP Poll. (#) Tournament seedings in parentheses. All times are in Eastern Time.
