= 1935–36 Long Island Blackbirds men's basketball team =

American college basketball season

1935–36 Long Island Blackbirds men's basketball
- Conference: Independent
- Record: 26–0
- Head coach: Clair Bee (5th season)

The 1935–36 Long Island Blackbirds men's basketball team represented Long Island University during the 1935–36 NCAA men's basketball season in the United States. The head coach was Clair Bee, coaching in his fifth season with the Blackbirds. The players were Willie Schwartz, Jules Bender, Ben Kramer, Ken Norton, Leo Merson, Marius Russo, and Arthur Hillhouse.

The team finished the season with a 26–0 record. Several decades later, the team was retroactively listed as the top team of the season by the Premo-Porretta Power Poll.
