= 2014–15 Brown Bears men's basketball team =

American college basketball season

2014–15 Brown Bears men's basketball
- Conference: Ivy League
- Record: 13–18 (4–10 Ivy)
- Head coach: Mike Martin (3rd season)
- Assistant coaches: T. J. Sorrentine; Dwayne Pina; Paul Halas
- Home arena: Pizzitola Sports Center

2014–15 Ivy League men's basketball standings
	Conf.				Overall
Team	W		L	PCT	W		L	PCT
x-Harvard †	11	–	3	.786	22	–	8	.733
x-Yale	11	–	3	.786	22	–	10	.688
Princeton	9	–	5	.643	16	–	14	.533
Dartmouth	7	–	7	.500	14	–	15	.483
Columbia	5	–	9	.357	13	–	15	.464
Cornell	5	–	9	.357	13	–	17	.433
Penn	4	–	10	.286	9	–	19	.321
Brown	4	–	10	.286	13	–	18	.419
x – Ivy League co-champions † – NCAA participant

The 2014–15 Brown Bears men's basketball team represented Brown University during the 2014–15 NCAA Division I men's basketball season. The Bears, led by third year head coach Mike Martin, played their home games at the Pizzitola Sports Center and were members of the Ivy League. They finished the season 13–18, 4–10 in Ivy League play to finish in a tie for seventh place.

== Previous season ==
The Bears finished the season 15–14, 7–7 in Ivy League play to finish in fifth place. They were invited to the CollegeInsider.com Tournament (CIT) where they lost in the first round to Holy Cross.

== Roster ==
Number	Name	Position	Height	Weight	Year	Hometown
1	Longji Yiljep	Guard	6–5	180	Senior	Sanaru-Zaria, Nigeria
2	Leland King	Forward	6–7	220	Sophomore	Inglewood, California
3	Steven Spieth	Guard	6–6	200	Sophomore	Dallas, Texas
10	Tavon Blackmon	Guard	6–0	170	Sophomore	Upper Marlboro, Maryland
11	Joe Sharkey	Guard	6–2	190	Senior	Norwood, Massachusetts
12	Norman Hobbie	Guard	6–4	190	Sophomore	Spring Lake, New Jersey
13	Patrick Triplett	Guard	6–4	210	Freshman	St. Louis, Missouri
21	Cedric Kuakumensah	Forward	6–9	245	Junior	Worcester, Massachusetts
22	Tyler Williams	Guard	6–1	175	Freshman	West Chester, Ohio
25	Jason Massey	Guard	6–5	200	Freshman	Cooper City, Florida
31	Miki Ljuboja	Forward	6–8	230	Freshman	North Riverside, Illinois
32	Zeve Sanderson	Guard	6–1	180	Senior	Los Angeles, California
33	Kyle Haber	Forward	6–7	180	Freshman	Dubuque, Iowa
42	Dockery Walker	Forward	6–7	220	Senior	Magnolia, Delaware
45	Rafael Maia	Forward	6–9	245	Junior	São Paulo, Brazil
50	Jon Schmidt	Forward	6–7	215	Senior	Baltimore, Maryland

== Schedule ==
Date time, TV	Rank^{#}	Opponent^{#}	Result	Record	Site (attendance) city, state
Non-conference regular season
11/14/2014*; 8:00 pm		Saint Peter's	W 70–58	1–0	Pizzitola Sports Center (1,128); Providence, RI
11/17/2014*; 7:00 pm		Northwestern	L 56–69	1–1	Pizzitola Sports Center (1,503); Providence, RI
11/19/2014*; 7:00 pm		at Holy Cross	L 65–80	1–2	Hart Center (1,805); Worcester, MA
11/22/2014*; 6:00 pm		at Indiana State; Las Vegas Invitational	L 66-78	1-3	Hulman Center (3,721); Terre Haute, IN
11/24/2014*; 6:00 pm, ESPN3		at Illinois; Las Vegas Invitational	L 68–89	1–4	State Farm Center (11,422); Champaign, IL
11/27/2014*; 2:00 pm		vs. Austin Peay; Las Vegas Invitational	L 58–79	1–5	Orleans Arena (355); Paradise, NV
11/28/2014*; 2:30 pm		vs. Prairie View A&M; Las Vegas Invitational	W 81–71	2–5	Orleans Arena (665); Paradise, NV
11/30/2014*; 4:00 pm		Johnson & Wales	W 75–65	3–5	Pizzitola Sports Center (425); Providence, RI
12/03/2014*; 7:00 pm		American	L 49–66	3–6	Pizzitola Sports Center (247); Providence, RI
12/06/2014*; 7:30 pm		Bryant; Ocean State Cup	W 69–62	4–6	Pizzitola Sports Center (623); Providence, RI
12/08/2014*; 9:00 pm, FS2		at Providence; Ocean State Cup	W 77–67	5–6	Dunkin' Donuts Center (4,124); Providence, RI
12/22/2014*; 2:00 pm		at Central Connecticut	W 67–55	6–6	William H. Detrick Gymnasium (1,012); New Britain, CT
12/28/2014*; 2:00 pm		Sacred Heart	W 79–76	7–6	Pizzitola Sports Center (539); Providence, RI
12/31/2014*; 4:00 pm		at Rhode Island; Ocean State Cup	L 60–80	7–7	Ryan Center (5,015); Kingston, RI
01/05/2015*; 7:00 pm		UMass Lowell	W 58–49	8–7	Pizzitola Sports Center (337); Providence, RI
01/08/2015*; 7:00 pm		at New Hampshire	L 61–68	8–8	Lundholm Gym (456); Durham, NH
01/12/2015*; 7:00 pm		Lyndon State	W 88–42	9–8	Pizzitola Sports Center (381); Providence, RI
Conference regular season
01/17/2015; 2:00 pm		Yale	L 62–80	9–9 (0–1)	Pizzitola Sports Center (689); Providence, RI
01/24/2015; 2:00 pm		at Yale	L 65–69	9–10 (0–2)	Payne Whitney Gymnasium (1,736); New Haven, CT
01/30/2015; 7:00 pm		at Cornell	L 49–57	9–11 (0–3)	Newman Arena (2,712); Ithaca, NY
01/31/2015; 7:00 pm		at Columbia	L 65–86	9–12 (0–4)	Levien Gymnasium (1,768); New York, NY
02/06/2015; 7:00 pm		Harvard	L 74–76 ^{OT}	9–13 (0–5)	Pizzitola Sports Center (1,567); Providence, RI
02/07/2015; 6:00 pm		Dartmouth	W 67–64	10–13 (1–5)	Pizzitola Sports Center (907); Providence, RI
02/13/2015; 7:00 pm, ASN		at Princeton	L 64–75	10–14 (1–6)	Jadwin Gymnasium (1,727); Princeton, NJ
02/14/2015; 7:00 pm		at Penn	W 71–55	11–14 (2–6)	Palestra (1,518); Philadelphia, PA
02/20/2015; 7:00 pm, ASN		Columbia	L 55–73	11–15 (2–7)	Pizzitola Sports Center (760); Providence, RI
02/21/2015; 6:00 pm		Cornell	W 57–56	12–15 (3–7)	Pizzitola Sports Center (562); Providence, RI
02/27/2015; 7:00 pm		Penn	W 75–69	13–15 (4–7)	Pizzitola Sports Center (619); Providence, RI
02/28/2015; 6:00 pm		Princeton	L 62–80	13–16 (4–8)	Pizzitola Sports Center (801); Providence, RI
03/06/2015; 7:00 pm		at Dartmouth	L 69–75	13–17 (4–9)	Leede Arena (652); Hanover, NH
03/07/2015; 7:00 pm, CBSSN		at Harvard	L 62–72	13–18 (4–10)	Lavietes Pavilion (2,195); Cambridge, MA
*Non-conference game. ^{#}Rankings from AP Poll. (#) Tournament seedings in parentheses. All times are in Eastern Time.
