= 2014–15 Penn Quakers men's basketball team =

American college basketball season

2014–15 Penn Quakers men's basketball
- Conference: Ivy League
- Record: 9–19 (4–10 Ivy)
- Head coach: Jerome Allen (6th season)
- Assistant coaches: Nat Graham; Ira Bowman; Mike Lintulahti
- Home arena: The Palestra

2014–15 Ivy League men's basketball standings
	Conf.				Overall
Team	W		L	PCT	W		L	PCT
x-Harvard †	11	–	3	.786	22	–	8	.733
x-Yale	11	–	3	.786	22	–	10	.688
Princeton	9	–	5	.643	16	–	14	.533
Dartmouth	7	–	7	.500	14	–	15	.483
Columbia	5	–	9	.357	13	–	15	.464
Cornell	5	–	9	.357	13	–	17	.433
Penn	4	–	10	.286	9	–	19	.321
Brown	4	–	10	.286	13	–	18	.419
x – Ivy League co-champions † – NCAA participant

The 2014–15 Penn Quakers men's basketball team represented the University of Pennsylvania during the 2014–15 NCAA Division I men's basketball season. The Quakers, led by sixth year head coach Jerome Allen, played their home games at The Palestra and were members of the Ivy League. They finished the season 9–19, 4–10 in Ivy League play to finish in a tie for seventh place.

== Previous season ==
The Quakers finished the season 8–20, 5–9 in Ivy League play to finish in a tie for sixth place.

== Roster ==
Number	Name	Position	Height	Weight	Year	Hometown
1	Shawn Simmons	Guard	6–4	170	Freshman	Virginia Beach, Virginia
2	Antonio Woods	Guard	6–1	180	Freshman	Cincinnati, Ohio
3	Darnell Foreman	Guard	6–1	175	Freshman	Pennsauken, New Jersey
4	Jamal Lewis	Guard	6–0	160	Junior	Springdale, Maryland
10	Darien Nelson-Henry	Center	6–11	265	Junior	Kirkland, Washington
11	Tony Hicks	Guard	6–2	180	Sophomore	South Holland, Illinois
13	Dylan Jones	Forward	6–8	215	Sophomore	Houston, Texas
15	Camryn Crocker	Guard	6–3	170	Senior	Cypress, California
22	Mike Auger	Forward	6–7	225	Freshman	Hopkinton, New Hampshire
23	Greg Louis	Forward	6–7	215	Senior	West Palm Beach, Florida
24	Matt Howard	Guard	6–4	185	Sophomore	Columbia, South Carolina
30	Patrick Lucas-Perry	Guard	5–11	165	Senior	Grand Blanc, Michigan
32	Preston Troutt	Guard	5–11	165	Sophomore	Dallas, Texas
34	Sam Jones	Forward	6–7	175	Freshman	Gilbert, Arizona
40	Dan Dwyer	Forward	6–8	225	Freshman	River Forest, Illinois

== Schedule ==
Date time, TV	Rank^{#}	Opponent^{#}	Result	Record	Site (attendance) city, state
Regular season
11/15/2014*; 4:30 pm		Delaware State	L 75–77 ^{OT}	0–1	Palestra (2,535); Philadelphia, PA
11/18/2014*; 7:00 pm		Rider	L 57–73	0–2	Palestra (1,066); Philadelphia, PA
11/22/2014*; 7:00 pm		Lafayette	L 77–83	0–3	Palestra (3,824); Philadelphia, PA
11/25/2014*; 7:00 pm, ESPN3		at Temple	L 67–76	0–4	Liacouras Center (4,292); Philadelphia, PA
11/29/2014*; 4:00 pm		at Wagner	L 61–64	0–5	Spiro Sports Center (1,876); Staten Island, NY
12/03/2014*; 7:00 pm		at Navy	W 57–46	1–5	Alumni Hall (586); Annapolis, MD
12/06/2014*; 2:00 pm		at Binghamton	W 79–70	2–5	Binghamton University Events Center (3,731); Vestal, NY
12/09/2014*; 8:00 pm		Marist	W 59–42	3–5	Palestra (1,262); Philadelphia, PA
12/22/2014*; 8:00 pm		at Vanderbilt	L 50–79	3–6	Memorial Gymnasium (8,084); Nashville, TN
12/30/2014*; 7:00 pm		at La Salle	L 67–84	3–7	Tom Gola Arena (2,273); Philadelphia, PA
01/10/2015; 5:00 pm		at Princeton; Rivalry	L 74–78	3–8 (0–1)	Jadwin Gymnasium (2,473); Princeton, NJ
01/13/2015*; 7:00 pm		at Niagara	W 67–56	4–8	Gallagher Center (846); Lewiston, NY
01/17/2015*; 7:00 pm, ESPN3		No. 5 Villanova	L 47–62	4–9	Palestra (8,722); Philadelphia, PA
01/21/2015*; 8:00 pm		Monmouth	L 56–71	4–10	Palestra (1,755); Philadelphia, PA
01/24/2015*; 7:00 pm		Saint Joseph's	W 56–52	5–10	Palestra (8,538); Philadelphia, PA
01/30/2015; 7:00 pm, ESPN3		Dartmouth	W 58–51	6–10 (1–1)	Palestra (2,107); Philadelphia, PA
01/31/2015; 7:00 pm		Harvard	L 38–63	6–11 (1–2)	Palestra (4,632); Philadelphia, PA
02/06/2015; 8:00 pm, ASN		at Cornell	W 71–69	7–11 (2–2)	Newman Arena (2,713); Ithaca, NY
02/07/2015; 7:00 pm		at Columbia	L 56–83	7–12 (2–3)	Levien Gymnasium (2,590); New York City, NY
02/13/2015; 7:00 pm		Yale	L 48–75	7–13 (2–4)	Palestra (2,044); Philadelphia, PA
02/14/2015; 7:00 pm		Brown	L 55–71	7–14 (2–5)	Palestra (1,518); Philadelphia, PA
02/20/2015; 7:00 pm, ESPN3		at Harvard	L 46–69	7–15 (2–6)	Lavietes Pavilion (1,295); Cambridge, MA
02/21/2015; 7:00 pm		at Dartmouth	L 62–67	7–16 (2–7)	Leede Arena (893); Hanover, NH
02/27/2015; 7:00 pm		at Brown	L 69–75	7–17 (2–8)	Pizzitola Sports Center (619); Providence, RI
02/28/2015; 7:00 pm, ESPN3		at Yale	L 50–55	7–18 (2–9)	John J. Lee Amphitheater (1,916); New Haven, CT
03/06/2015; 7:00 pm, ESPN3		Columbia	W 54–46	8–18 (3–9)	Palestra (1,613); Philadelphia, PA
03/07/2015; 7:00 pm		Cornell	W 79–72	9–18 (4–9)	Palestra (2,029); Philadelphia, PA
03/10/2015; 7:30 pm, CBSSN		Princeton; Rivalry	L 52–73	9–19 (4–10)	Palestra (2,334); Philadelphia, PA
*Non-conference game. ^{#}Rankings from AP Poll. (#) Tournament seedings in parentheses. All times are in Eastern Time.
