= 2014–15 Yale Bulldogs men's basketball team =

American college basketball season

2014–15 Yale Bulldogs men's basketball

Ivy League regular season co–champions

One-game playoff vs. Harvard, Lost 53–51
- Conference: Ivy League
- Record: 22–10 (11–3 Ivy)
- Head coach: James Jones (16th season)
- Assistant coaches: Matt Kingsley; Justin Simon; Anthony Goins
- Home arena: John J. Lee Amphitheater

2014–15 Ivy League men's basketball standings
	Conf.				Overall
Team	W		L	PCT	W		L	PCT
x-Harvard †	11	–	3	.786	22	–	8	.733
x-Yale	11	–	3	.786	22	–	10	.688
Princeton	9	–	5	.643	16	–	14	.533
Dartmouth	7	–	7	.500	14	–	15	.483
Columbia	5	–	9	.357	13	–	15	.464
Cornell	5	–	9	.357	13	–	17	.433
Penn	4	–	10	.286	9	–	19	.321
Brown	4	–	10	.286	13	–	18	.419
x – Ivy League co-champions † – NCAA participant

The 2014–15 Yale Bulldogs men's basketball team represented Yale University during the 2014–15 NCAA Division I men's basketball season. The Bulldogs, led by 16th year head coach James Jones, played their home games at John J. Lee Amphitheater of the Payne Whitney Gymnasium and were members of the Ivy League. The Bulldogs lost their One-game playoff against Harvard 53–51. Despite having posted an 11–3 Ivy League record and a 22–10 overall record the Bulldogs weren't invited to a postseason tournament.

== Previous season ==
The Bulldogs finished the season 19–14, 9–5 in Ivy League play to finish in second place. They were invited to the CollegeInsider.com Tournament where they defeated Quinnipiac, Holy Cross, Columbia and VMI to advance to the CIT championship game where they lost to Murray State.

== Departures ==
Name	Number	Pos.	Height	Weight	Year	Hometown	Notes
Jeremiah Kreisberg	50	C/F	6'10"	240	Senior	Berkeley, CA	Graduated
Jesse Pritchard	11	G	6'5"	210	Senior	Ames, IA	Graduated
Isaiah Salafia	23	G	6'3"	185	Senior	Cromwell, CT	Graduated
Brandon Sherrod	35	F	6'6"	240	Junior	Bridgeport, CT	Took leave to join the school's Whiffenpoofs vocal group; returned in 2015–16

== Roster ==
Number	Name	Position	Height	Weight	Year	Hometown
1	Anthony Dallier	Guard	6–6	190	Sophomore	Wexford, Pennsylvania
4	Jack Montague	Guard	6–0	185	Junior	Brentwood, Tennessee
5	Eric Anderson	Guard/Forward	6–7	215	Freshman	West Chester, Pennsylvania
10	Khaliq Ghani	Guard	6–5	205	Junior	Inglewood, California
11	Makai Mason	Guard	6–1	185	Freshman	Greenfield, Massachusetts
12	Armani Cotton	Guard	6–7	215	Senior	New York City, New York
20	Javier Duren	Guard	6–4	185	Senior	St. Louis, Missouri
21	Nick Victor	Guard	6–5	205	Junior	Dallas, Texas
22	Justin Sears	Forward	6–8	205	Junior	Plainfield, New Jersey
23	Landon Russell	Guard	6–2	180	Freshman	Fort Worth, Texas
25	AJ Edwards	Guard	6–5	190	Sophomore	Seattle, Washington
32	Greg Kelley	Forward	6–8	225	Senior	Newton, Massachusetts
42	Matt Townsend	Forward	6–7	240	Senior	Chappaqua, New York
44	Sam Downey	Forward	6–9	230	Sophomore	Lake Forest, Illinois
50	Sem Kroon	Forward	6–10	240	Freshman	Riverside, California

== Schedule ==
Date time, TV	Rank^{#}	Opponent^{#}	Result	Record	Site (attendance) city, state
Regular season
11/14/2014*; 5:30 pm		at Quinnipiac; Connecticut 6 Classic	L 85–89 ^{2OT}	0–1	TD Bank Sports Center (3,300); Hamden, CT
11/17/2014*; 7:00 pm		Newbury; Men Against Breast Cancer Classic	W 97–51	1–1	John J. Lee Amphitheater (459); New Haven, CT
11/21/2014*; 5:00 pm		vs. UIC; Men Against Breast Cancer Classic	W 70–58	2–1	MAC Center (173); Kent, OH
11/22/2014*; 5:00 pm		vs. Southern Illinois; Men Against Breast Cancer Classic	W 53–46	3-1	MAC Center (325); Kent, OH
11/23/2014*; 3:30 pm		at Kent State; Men Against Breast Cancer Classic	W 66–59	4–1	MAC Center (2,183); Kent, OH
11/26/2014*; 7:00 pm		Lafayette	W 82–60	5–1	John J. Lee Amphitheater (462); New Haven, CT
11/28/2014*; 4:00 pm, FS1		at Providence	L 66–72	5–2	Dunkin' Donuts Center (8,045); Providence, RI
11/30/2014*; 2:00 pm		Hartford	W 69–57	6–2	John J. Lee Amphitheater (532); New Haven, CT
12/03/2014*; 7:30 pm		at Bryant	W 67–60	7–2	Chace Athletic Center (732); Smithfield, RI
12/05/2014*; 7:00 pm, SNY		at UConn	W 45–44	8–2	Gampel Pavilion (9,538); Storrs, CT
12/08/2014*; 7:00 pm, SECN		at Florida	L 47–85	8–3	O'Connell Center (8,711); Gainesville, FL
12/18/2014*; 7:00 pm		at Vermont	W 57–56	9–3	Patrick Gym (1,761); Burlington, VT
12/20/2014*; 2:00 pm		Albany	L 60–64	9–4	John J. Lee Amphitheater (882); New Haven, CT
12/30/2014*; 2:00 pm		at Sacred Heart	W 70–64	10–4	William H. Pitt Center (402); Fairfield, CT
01/03/2015*; 2:00 pm		at Vanderbilt	L 74–79 ^{2OT}	10–5	Memorial Gymnasium (10,103); Nashville, TN
01/09/2015*; 7:00 pm		at NJIT	L 71–78	10–6	Fleisher Center (780); Newark, NJ
01/10/2015*; 7:00 pm		Daniel Webster	W 102–47	11–6	John J. Lee Amphitheater (811); New Haven, CT
01/17/2015; 2:00 pm		at Brown	W 80–62	12–6 (1–0)	Pizzitola Sports Center (689); Providence, RI
01/24/2015; 2:00 pm		Brown	W 69–65	13–6 (2–0)	John J. Lee Amphitheater (1,736); New Haven, CT
01/30/2015; 8:00 pm, ASN		at Columbia	W 63–59	14–6 (3–0)	Levien Gymnasium (2,223); New York City, NY
01/31/2015; 6:00 pm		at Cornell	W 65–57	15–6 (4–0)	Newman Arena (3,119); Ithaca, NY
02/06/2015; 7:00 pm, CBSSN		Dartmouth	W 81–66	16–6 (5–0)	John J. Lee Amphitheater (1,872); New Haven, CT
02/07/2015; 7:00 pm		Harvard	L 50–52	16–7 (5–1)	John J. Lee Amphitheater (2,532); New Haven, CT
02/13/2015; 7:00 pm		at Penn	W 75–48	17–7 (6–1)	Palestra (2,044); Philadelphia, PA
02/14/2015; 6:00 pm		at Princeton	W 81–73	18–7 (7–1)	Jadwin Gymnasium (2,436); Princeton, NJ
02/20/2015; 7:00 pm		Cornell	W 62–51	19–7 (8–1)	John J. Lee Amphitheater (1,359); New Haven, CT
02/21/2015; 7:00 pm		Columbia	L 50–56	19–8 (8–2)	John J. Lee Amphitheater (1,936); New Haven, CT
02/27/2015; 7:00 pm		Princeton	W 81–60	20–8 (9–2)	John J. Lee Amphitheater (1,961); New Haven, CT
02/28/2015; 7:00 pm, ESPN3		Penn	W 55–50	21–8 (10–2)	John J. Lee Amphitheater (1,916); New Haven, CT
03/06/2015; 8:00 pm, ASN		at Harvard	W 62–52	22–8 (11–2)	Lavietes Pavilion (2,195); Cambridge, MA
03/07/2015; 7:08 pm		at Dartmouth	L 58–59	22–9 (11–3)	Leede Arena (1,654); Hanover, NH
Ivy League one game playoff
03/14/2015; 4:00 pm, ASN/ESPN3		vs. Harvard	L 51–53	22–10	Palestra (5,256); Philadelphia, PA
*Non-conference game. ^{#}Rankings from AP Poll. (#) Tournament seedings in parentheses. All times are in Eastern Time.
