= 2014–15 Princeton Tigers men's basketball team =

American college basketball season

2014–15 Princeton Tigers men's basketball
- Conference: Ivy League
- Record: 16–14 (9–5 Ivy)
- Head coach: Mitch Henderson (4th season)
- Assistant coaches: Brian Earl; Marcus Jenkins; Brett MacConnell
- Home arena: Jadwin Gymnasium

2014–15 Ivy League men's basketball standings
	Conf.				Overall
Team	W		L	PCT	W		L	PCT
x-Harvard †	11	–	3	.786	22	–	8	.733
x-Yale	11	–	3	.786	22	–	10	.688
Princeton	9	–	5	.643	16	–	14	.533
Dartmouth	7	–	7	.500	14	–	15	.483
Columbia	5	–	9	.357	13	–	15	.464
Cornell	5	–	9	.357	13	–	17	.433
Penn	4	–	10	.286	9	–	19	.321
Brown	4	–	10	.286	13	–	18	.419
x – Ivy League co-champions † – NCAA participant

The 2014–15 Princeton Tigers men's basketball team represented Princeton University during the 2014–15 NCAA Division I men's basketball season. The Tigers, led by fourth-year head coach Mitch Henderson, played their home games at Jadwin Gymnasium and were members of the Ivy League. They finished the season 16–14, 9–5 in Ivy League play to finish in third place.

== Awards and accomplishments ==
Spencer Weisz earned second-team All-Ivy League recognition in 2015. As a sophomore, in 2014-15 he was 6th in the Ivy League in 3-point field goal percentage (.408), 7th in 3-point field goals (51), and 8th in scoring (11.6).

== Roster ==
Number	Name	Position	Height	Weight	Year	Hometown
0	Aaron Young	Guard	6–0	170	Freshman	Lynchburg, Virginia
3	Clay Wilson	Guard	6–3	170	Senior	Tulsa, Oklahoma
4	Denton Koon	Forward	6–8	210	Senior	Liberty, Missouri
5	Amir Bell	Guard	6–3	160	Freshman	East Brunswick, New Jersey
10	Spencer Weisz	Forward	6–4	180	Sophomore	Florham Park, New Jersey
12	Ben Hazel	Guard/forward	6–5	191	Senior	Bowie, Maryland
13	Mike Washington Jr.	Guard	6–3	190	Junior	Oak Harbor, Washington
14	Khyan Rayner	Guard	5–11	165	Sophomore	Portland, Oregon
15	Hashim Moore	Forward	6–5	220	Sophomore	Fort Lauderdale, Florida
21	Henry Caruso	Forward	6–4	190	Sophomore	San Mateo, California
23	Mike LeBlanc	Forward	6–6	185	Freshman	Dover, New Hampshire
25	Steven Cook	Forward	6–5	185	Sophomore	Winnetka, Illinois
30	Hans Brase	Forward	6–8	231	Junior	Clover, South Carolina
31	Pete Miller	Forward	6–10	225	Sophomore	Northfield, Massachusetts
32	Daniel Edwards	Forward	6–8	225	Senior	Dallas, Texas
35	Alec Brennan	Forward	6–11	235	Freshman	Weston, Massachusetts
40	Bobby Garbade	Center	6–11	234	Senior	Binghamton, New York

== Schedule ==
Date time, TV	Rank^{#}	Opponent^{#}	Result	Record	Site (attendance) city, state
Regular season
11/14/2014*; 7:00 pm		Rider	W 64–58	1–0	Jadwin Gymnasium (1,939); Princeton, NJ
11/16/2014*; 1:00 pm		at George Mason	L 60–63	1–1	Patriot Center (3,097); Fairfax, VA
11/19/2014*; 7:00 pm		at Lafayette	L 66–83	1–2	Kirby Sports Center (1,826); Easton, PA
11/22/2014*; 11:00 am		Incarnate Word	L 68–79	1–3	Jadwin Gymnasium (1,554); Princeton, NJ
11/27/2014*; 2:00 pm, ESPNU		vs. UTEP; Wooden Legacy quarterfinals	L 56–62	1–4	Titan Gym (N/A); Fullerton, CA
11/28/2014*; 6:00 pm, ESPN3		vs. San Diego; Wooden Legacy consolation round	L 65–75	1–5	Titan Gym (1,312); Fullerton, CA
11/30/2014*; 7:30 pm, ESPN3		vs. San Jose State; Wooden Legacy 7th place game	W 69–54	2–5	Honda Center (N/A); Anaheim, CA
12/03/2014*; 9:30 pm		at Fairleigh Dickinson	L 85–89	2–6	Rothman Center (1,093); Hackensack, NJ
12/06/2014*; 4:30 pm		Stony Brook	W 77–64	3–6	Jadwin Gymnasium (1,968); Princeton, NJ
12/10/2014*; 8:00 pm		at Saint Peter's	L 46–60	3–7	Yanitelli Center (518); Jersey City, NJ
12/13/2014*; 8:30 pm, P12N		at California	L 57–67	3–8	Haas Pavilion (7,459); Berkeley, CA
12/19/2014*; 8:00 pm		Lipscomb	W 77–55	4–8	Jadwin Gymnasium (1,818); Princeton, NJ
12/22/2014*; 7:00 pm		Liberty	W 65–47	5–8	Jadwin Gymnasium (1,819); Princeton, NJ
12/31/2014*; 1:00 pm, ESPN3		at Wake Forest	L 66–80	5–9	LJVM Coliseum (9,245); Winston-Salem, NC
01/06/2015*; 7:00 pm		Norfolk State	W 71–61	6–9	Jadwin Gymnasium (1,264); Princeton, NJ
01/10/2015; 5:00 pm		Penn; Rivalry	W 78–74	7–9 (1–0)	Jadwin Gymnasium (2,473); Princeton, NJ
01/25/2015*; 2:00 pm		Rowan	W 96–48	8–9	Jadwin Gymnasium (1,774); Princeton, NJ
01/30/2015; 6:00 pm, ESPNU		Harvard	L 72–75	8–10 (1–1)	Jadwin Gymnasium (2,570); Princeton, NJ
01/31/2015; 6:00 pm		Dartmouth	W 64–53	9–10 (2–1)	Jadwin Gymnasium (2,615); Princeton, NJ
02/06/2015; 7:00 pm		at Columbia	W 74–62	10–10 (3–1)	Levien Gymnasium (1,812); New York City, NY
02/07/2015; 6:00 pm		at Cornell	L 60–68	10–11 (3–2)	Newman Arena (2,889); Ithaca, NY
02/13/2015; 8:00 pm		Brown	W 75–64	11–11 (4–2)	Jadwin Gymnasium (1,727); Princeton, NJ
02/14/2015; 6:00 pm		Yale	L 73–81	11–12 (4–3)	Jadwin Gymnasium (2,436); Princeton, NJ
02/20/2015; 7:00 pm		at Dartmouth	W 63–56	12–12 (5–3)	Leede Arena (1,112); Hanover, NH
02/21/2015; 7:00 pm, ESPN3		at Harvard	L 55–63	12–13 (5–4)	Lavietes Pavilion (2,195); Cambridge, MA
02/27/2015; 7:00 pm		at Yale	L 60–81	12–14 (5–5)	John J. Lee Amphitheater (1,961); New Haven, CT
02/28/2015; 6:00 pm		at Brown	W 80–62	13–14 (6–5)	Pizzitola Sports Center (801); Providence, RI
03/06/2015; 7:00 pm		Cornell	W 66–53	14–14 (7–5)	Jadwin Gymnasium (1,843); Princeton, NJ
03/07/2015; 6:00 pm		Columbia	W 85–83	15–14 (8–5)	Jadwin Gymnasium (2,363); Princeton, NJ
03/10/2015; 7:30 pm, CBSSN		at Penn; Rivalry	W 73–52	16–14 (9–5)	Palestra (2,334); Philadelphia, PA
*Non-conference game. ^{#}Rankings from AP Poll. (#) Tournament seedings in parentheses. All times are in Eastern Time.

== See also ==
- 2014–15 Princeton Tigers women's basketball team
