= Chip Hilton Player of the Year Award =

Men's college basketball player award, 1997–2011

- Awarded for: the men's college basketball player senior who demonstrated character, leadership, and sportsmanship
- Country: United States
- Presented by: NABC

History
- First award: 1997
- Final award: 2011

The Chip Hilton Player of the Year Award was presented by the National Association of Basketball Coaches (NABC) to an NCAA Division I men's college basketball player who was a senior and who had demonstrated outstanding character, leadership, integrity, humility, sportsmanship and talent, similar to the fictional Chip Hilton character depicted by Hall of Fame coach Clair Bee in the classic Chip Hilton series of sports stories. It was first awarded in 1996–97 and discontinued after the 2010–11 season.

== Winners ==
Hassan Booker, Navy, 1998

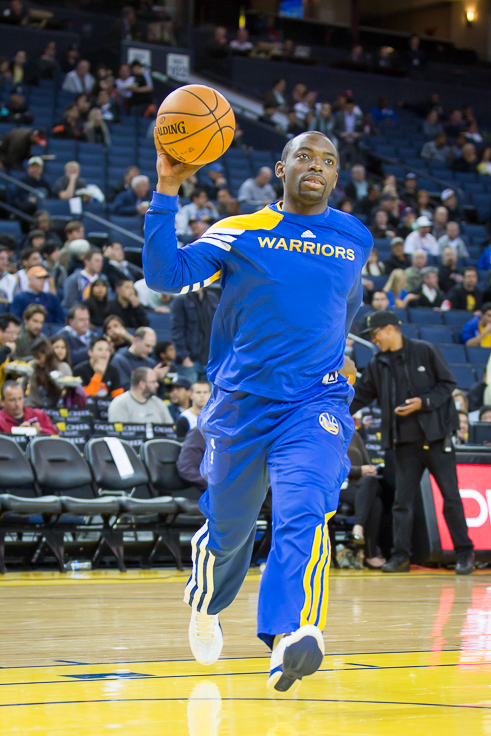
Charles Jenkins, Hofstra, 2011

Season	Player	School	Reference
1996–97	Tim Duncan	Wake Forest	
1997–98	Hassan Booker	Navy	
1998–99	Tim Hill	Harvard	
1999–00	Eduardo Nájera	Oklahoma	
2000–01	Shane Battier	Duke	
2001–02	Juan Dixon	Maryland	
2002–03	Brandon Miller	Butler	
2003–04	Emeka Okafor^{[a]}	UConn	
2004–05	Ronald Ross	Texas Tech	
2005–06	Gerry McNamara	Syracuse	
2006–07	Acie Law IV	Texas A&M	
2007–08	Mike Green	Butler	
2008–09	Jon Brockman	Washington	
2009–10	Román Martínez	New Mexico	
2010–11	Charles Jenkins	Hofstra	

- ^{a} Okafor graduated as a finance major in only three years. He was a senior academically in 2003–04, but was still considered a junior as it related to his athletic eligibility.

== See also ==
- Clair Bee Coach of the Year Award – equivalent award presented to an NCAA Division I men's basketball head coach, sponsored by the NABC
