= 2014–15 Ivy League men's basketball season =

- League: NCAA Division I
- Sport: Basketball
- Duration: January 11 – March 11, 2015
- Teams: 8
- TV partner: Ivy League Digital Network

Regular season
- Champions: Harvard and Yale
- Season MVP: Justin Sears, Yale

One-game playoff (March 14)
- Champions: Harvard 53-51

Basketball seasons
- ← 2013–14 2015–16 →

2014–15 Ivy League men's basketball standings
	Conf.				Overall
Team	W		L	PCT	W		L	PCT
x-Harvard †	11	–	3	.786	22	–	8	.733
x-Yale	11	–	3	.786	22	–	10	.688
Princeton	9	–	5	.643	16	–	14	.533
Dartmouth	7	–	7	.500	14	–	15	.483
Columbia	5	–	9	.357	13	–	15	.464
Cornell	5	–	9	.357	13	–	17	.433
Penn	4	–	10	.286	9	–	19	.321
Brown	4	–	10	.286	13	–	18	.419
x – Ivy League co-champions † – NCAA participant

The 2014–15 Ivy League men's basketball season marked the continuation of the annual tradition of competitive basketball among Ivy League members. The tradition began when the league was formed during the 1956–57 season and its history extends to the predecessor Eastern Intercollegiate Basketball League, which was formed in 1902.

Harvard and Yale shared the league title after finishing the regular season tied with identical 11-3 conference records. Harvard earned the league's automatic bid to the 2015 NCAA Men's Division I Basketball Tournament by defeating Yale 53–51 in a one-game playoff. Overall, the conference had five postseason participants and won eight postseason games, marking the best postseason in league history.

Wesley Saunders of Harvard was named Ivy League Men's Basketball Player of the Year. James Jones of Yale was named Ivy League Coach of the Year and Spencer Weisz of Princeton was named Ivy League Freshman of the Year. Brown's Cedric Kuakumensah earned his second consecutive Ivy League Defensive Player of the Year recognition.

Saunders was an Associated Press honorable mention NCAA Men's Basketball All-American. On February 20, Matt Townsend of Yale was named a third team Academic All-American selection. Penn's Dau Jok was named to the Allstate Good Works Team by the National Association of Basketball Coaches (NABC) and earned the Most Courageous Award from the United States Basketball Writers Association (USBWA).

The NABC named Saunders, T.J. Bray of Princeton and Justin Sears of Yale to the All-District 13 First Team and Sean McGonagill of Brown and Siyani Chambers of Harvard to its Second Team. The USBWA named Saunders to its All-District I Team.

== All-Ivy Teams ==
First Team All-Ivy
	School	Class	Position
Maodo Lô*	Columbia	Junior	Guard
Shonn Miller*	Cornell	Senior	Forward
Wesley Saunders*	Harvard	Senior	Guard
Javier Duren*	Yale	Senior	Guard
Justin Sears*	Yale	Junior	Forward

*Unanimous

Second Team All-Ivy
	School	Class	Position
Cedric Kuakumensah	Brown	Junior	Forward
Gabas Maldunas	Dartmouth	Senior	Center
Alex Mitola	Dartmouth	Junior	Guard
Siyani Chambers	Harvard	Junior	Guard
Steve Moundou-Missi	Harvard	Senior	Forward
Steve Cook	Princeton	Sophomore	Forward
Spencer Weisz	Princeton	Sophomore	Forward

== NCAA tournament ==
Seed	Region	School	First Four	Round of 64	Round of 32	Sweet 16	Elite Eight	Final Four	Championship
13	West	Harvard	n/a	Eliminated by North Carolina, 67-65					
		W–L (%):	0–0 –	0–1 .000	0–0 .000	0–0 –	0–0 –	0–0 –	0–0 –Total:0-1 .000

== College Basketball Invitational ==
School	First round	Quarterfinals	Semifinals	Finals
Princeton	Defeated Tulane 56–55	Eliminated by Fresno State 56–72		
W–L (%):	1–0 1.000	0–1 .000	0–0 –	0–0 – Total: 1–1 .500

== CollegeInsider.com Postseason Tournament ==
School	First round	Second round	Quarterfinals	Semifinals	Finals
Brown	Eliminated by Holy Cross 65–68				
Columbia	Defeated Valparaiso 58–56	Defeated Eastern Michigan 69–56	Eliminated by Yale 69–72		
Yale	Defeated Quinnipiac 69–68	Defeated Holy Cross 71–56	Defeated Columbia 72–69	Defeated VMI 75–62	Eliminated by Murray State 65–57
W–L (%):	2–1 .667	2–0 1.000	1–1 .500	1–0 1.000	0–1 .000 Total: 6–3 .667
