= Joe Carrabino =

American basketball player and prominent businessman (born 1962)

Personal information
- Born: February 21, 1962 (age 64) Encino, California, U.S.
- Listed height: 6 ft 9 in (2.06 m)
- Listed weight: 235 lb (107 kg)

Career information
- High school: Crespi Carmelite (Los Angeles, California)
- College: Harvard (1980–1985)
- NBA draft: 1985: 6th round, 135th overall pick
- Drafted by: Denver Nuggets
- Playing career: 1985–1986
- Position: Small forward

Career history
- 1985: Gent Hawks
- 1986: Nunawading Spectres

Career highlights
- 2× AP honorable mention All-American (1984, 1985); Ivy League Player of the Year (1984); 2× First-team All-Ivy League (1984, 1985); Ivy League Rookie of the Year (1981)
- Stats at Basketball Reference

Joseph D. Carrabino Jr. (born February 21, 1962) is an American former professional basketball player and current businessman in the private equity industry. As of 2023, is the Head of Private Debt at AEA Investors. He graduated from Harvard University in 1985 as the school's all-time leading scorer, a record that still stands through the 2025–26 season.

== Basketball career ==
=== High school ===
Born in Encino, California, Carrabino played for the varsity team at Crespi Carmelite High School in Los Angeles for three seasons, where in two of those he was an All-Southern Section 4-A Division forward and graduated as the school's all-time leading scorer. Years later, Carrabino's then-high school assistant coach Ed Marek said, "He was the best shooter Crespi ever had."

=== College ===
In the fall of 1980, Carrabino enrolled to play for Harvard in Cambridge, Massachusetts at the encouragement of his father, citing academics as the driving factor. Since Harvard is an Ivy League school, they do not give athletic scholarships. Carrabino earned a starting role by the third game of his freshman season and never looked back. That year he averaged 14.6 points and 4.1 rebounds per game en route to being named the Ivy League Rookie of the Year. He set a school record for most points scored during a freshman campaign (380) while also being tabbed as an Honorable Mention All-Ivy League team member. The following season, he averaged 14.8 points and 5.8 rebounds, but the Crimson finished in sixth place in the league and Carrabino did not earn any individual accolades.

During Carrabino's junior year of 1982–83, he sustained a back injury early into the season and took a medical redshirt (sat out) the rest of the season.

When he returned in 1983–84, he made an impact by jumping his averages to 22.0 points and 7.3 rebounds per game, helping the Crimson finished in second place. He was named to the All-Ivy League First Team and became the first-ever Harvard player honored as the Ivy League Player of the Year. The Associated Press (AP) selected him as an Honorable Mention All-American, becoming Harvard's first All-American since 1946. Carrabino's 22.0 points ranked 21st in all of NCAA Division I, and his 90.5% free throw percentage was second in the nation behind Indiana's Steve Alford (91.3%).

In his senior season of 1984–85, despite failing to win his second straight player of the year award, Carrabino arguably had his best season ever, averaging 21.4 points and 8.0 rebounds per game. He was named to the All-Ivy League First Team as well as an AP Honorable Mention All-American for the second consecutive year, as Harvard finished fourth in the league standings. He was named a First Team Academic All-American and broke Harvard's men's basketball scoring record with 1,880 career points. Through 2022–23, Carrabino claims Harvard's second-highest career scoring average at 18.4 points per game and still holds the school record for field goals made with 708.

Carrabino was later inducted into the Harvard Varsity Club Hall of Fame in 2002.

=== Professional ===
In the ensuing 1985 NBA draft, Carrabino was chosen in the sixth round (135th overall) by the Denver Nuggets. He was cut three days into mini-camp. Carrabino felt "very lucky" that he at least got to attempt a shot at the NBA, a lifelong dream, but noted that the mini-camp was not ideal to showcase his skill set: "Still, I look back at the three days and think that this was a difficult camp for me to show what I can do. We didn't run any drills and basically just scrimmaged. The games eventually turn into playground contests, with the guards dribbling the length of the floor and going in for the layup. It's hard to play that game, especially in the afternoon when everyone is dragging."

In lieu of the NBA, Carrabino sought a professional career overseas. He went to Europe and played in Belgium for the Gent Hawks in 1985, followed by a one-year stint in Australia as a member of the Nunawading Spectres. He appeared in 26 games and averaged 24 points, 7.4 rebounds, and three assists for the Spectres. After two years of international professional ball, Carrabino decided to retire from the sport and return to the United States.

== Post-basketball life ==
Upon his return, he entered the field of finance and has worked in both investment banking and private equity. He is currently the Head of Private Debt at AEA Investors, one of the oldest private equity firms in the United States.
