= Tim Hill (basketball) =

American basketball player (born 1976)

Personal information
- Born: November 20, 1976 (age 49) Silver Spring, Maryland, U.S.
- Listed height: 5 ft 11 in (1.80 m)
- Listed weight: 155 lb (70 kg)

Career information
- High school: DeMatha Catholic (Hyattsville, Maryland)
- College: Harvard (1995–1999)
- NBA draft: 1999: undrafted
- Position: Point guard

Career history
- 1999–2000: Rotterdam Basketbal

Career highlights
- Chip Hilton Player of the Year (1999); First-team All-Ivy League (1999); 2× Second-team All-Ivy League (1997, 1998); Ivy League Rookie of the Year (1996)

Tim Hill (born November 20, 1976) is a retired American basketball player. A former guard for Harvard men's basketball, he never missed a start in his career, which lasted from 1996 to 1999. When he graduated from Harvard, he was the school's all-time assist leader and was the seventh all-time leading scorer. He was presented with the 1998–1999 Chip Hilton Award for demonstrating outstanding character, leadership, and talent.

After graduating Harvard, Hill played professionally for one year with Rotterdam Basketbal. In 2000, Hill announced his retirement from basketball and accepted a job with Goldman Sachs in New York City. On October 11, 2014, Hill was inducted into the Harvard Varsity Hall of Fame.

== High school career ==
Hill attended DeMatha Catholic High School in Hyattsville, Maryland. In 1994–95, Hill was named to the boys basketball All-Met First Team. Currently, Hill is a member on DeMatha's board of directors.

== College career ==
Hill chose Harvard over other offers from schools such as William & Mary, Boston University, and Rice. Hill was a four-year letterwinner and point guard for Harvard from 1995–96 to 1998–99. His senior class won 58 games during his four years, which was Harvard's winningest senior class at the time. He was the Crimson's starting point guard in all 103 of his career games and scored 1,385 points. Hill also recorded 590 assists and 153 steals. In 2014 he was inducted into the Harvard Varsity Club Hall of Fame

Throughout his collegiate career, he garnered the following honors and awards:

- Ivy League Rookie of the Year (1996)
- Honorable Mention All-Ivy League (1996)
- 2× Second Team All-Ivy League (1997, 1998)
- Academic All-Ivy Team (1998)
- Raymond P. Lavietes Most Valuable Player (1999)
- William J. Bingham Award (given to the top male athlete of Harvard's senior class; 1999)
- First Team All-Ivy League (1999)
- Second Team CoSIDA Academic All-American (1999)(
- Second Team All-District by the National Association of Basketball Coaches (1999)
- Bob Cousy Award for New England Players (1999)
- Chip Hilton Player of the Year Award (1999)

=== Career statistics ===
Season	School	Conf	Games	FG%	3P%	FT%	RPG	APG	SPG	PPG
1995–96	Harvard	Ivy	26	.374	.306	.758	2.2	5.2	1.2	10.1
1996–97	Harvard	Ivy	26	.399	.245	.869	2.7	5.8	1.1	12.8
1997–98	Harvard	Ivy	25	.448	.364	.830	2.5	5.3	1.7	14.9
1998–99	Harvard	Ivy	26	.397	.225	.850	2.8	6.6	1.9	16.0
Career			103	.405	.289	.832	2.6	5.7	1.5	13.4

== Professional career ==
In May 1999, Hill signed a one-year contract to play professionally for the Rotterdam Club in the Netherlands. He retired from basketball in 2000.

== Personal life ==
Hill was born at Holy Cross Hospital in Silver Spring, Maryland. He is the oldest of two children of Joan and Terry Hill. His younger brother, Greg, played basketball and football at Western Maryland College. His father, Terry, was a three-year starter on the American University basketball team. He married Jennifer Lynn Garst on July 26, 2003.
