= Chip Hilton =

Fictional character

- Volume 16 (1958)
- Author: Clair Bee
- Country: United States of America
- Language: English
- Genre: Sports
- Publisher: Grosset & Dunlap
- Published: 1948-1966 (#1-23); 2002 (#24)
- Media type: Print

William "Chip" Hilton is the central character in a series of 24 sports novels for adolescent boys written by the successful college basketball coach and 1968 Basketball Hall of Fame inductee Clair Bee (1896–1983). In addition to Bee's authorship of the Chip Hilton series, he was also the author of several basketball and coaching technique books. The Chip Hilton series was published between 1948 and 1966 by Grosset & Dunlap, with Bee's last manuscript, Fiery Fullback, published in 2002.

== Characterization ==
Unlike other Grosset & Dunlap boys series books of the period, the Chip Hilton stories are distinguished by a greater degree of psychological interest. The staidly perfect Chip serves as a foil for his much more human fellow characters. Chip Hilton excels at all major sports, except hockey and soccer. Like most series books heroes, he does have a love interest, but spends much of his time with his buddies: "Biggie," "Soapy," "Speed" and "Fireball" in pursuit of sports. His occasional girl friend is Mitzi, the head cashier at his employer's drug store, about whom he once daydreamed while looking in a storefront at a display for dancing lessons. Chip was based on Seton Hall basketball player Bob Davies, and Chip's coach, Henry "The Rock" Rockwell, was based on Bee himself.

== Plot structure ==
Chip Hilton books are always about football, basketball, or baseball. The most notable book in the series is Hoop Crazy, which examines the difficulties facing a black player wanting to join the basketball team. This is the only Chip Hilton book addressing social issues, and it does so in a compelling manner, although some of the early works did mention a great "negro" athlete, Miner, who played for one of the Big Reds' major rivals, Steeltown. Miner was presented as a gifted athlete without controversy over his participation; portraying an African-American athlete as accepted by teammate and foe alike. The reference is all the more interesting considering that the first books were written in the late 40s and early 50s when many pro teams, and even leagues, were yet to feature a black athlete. Tournament Crisis dealt with a team member who was Chinese and struggled to be included as a part of the team. He is initially depicted as angry and hard to like, and Chip works to help him and bring him around.

== Collectibles ==
The original series of 23 Chip Hilton books has become a popular collectible, with the last few books fetching the highest prices because of their relatively limited print runs. The first six Chip Hilton titles were originally issued in fire-engine red, smooth textured bindings, with blank outer covers and full color picture dust jackets. These first six titles were later re-issued with blank rougher tweed cover bindings and picture dust jackets, as were the first editions of issues #7 through #19. There is an "urban legend" circulating that volume #7 was also originally issued in a fire-engine red binding, but this is unverified.

All 23 original titles were then re-issued in picture cover versions (later than the stated publication dates for issues #1-#19), without dust jackets, using the original dust jacket illustrations for the picture cover illustrations, with some variations existing for many issues with regard to some of the back cover images and back cover book title listings.

There is an active market in the original Chip Hilton hardback books on the eBay auction site, with usually 60-70 copies or partial sets for sale at any one time, with prices ranging from as low as $1–$2 for rough condition copies of the more common copies of tweed binding edition books without dust jackets up to several hundred dollars or more for fine condition copies of Hungry Hurler (#23), of which apparently only about 12,000 copies were printed.

In the new paperbacks, the first printing of the first 12 books carry a holographic image of a Chip Hilton logo.

== List of titles ==
1. Touchdown Pass (1948)
2. Championship Ball (1948)
3. Strike Three! (1949)
4. Clutch Hitter (1949)
5. A Pass and a Prayer (1951)
6. Hoop Crazy (1950)
7. Pitchers' Duel (1950)
8. Dugout Jinx (1952)

9. Freshman Quarterback (1952)
10. Backboard Fever (1953)
11. Fence Busters (1953)
12. Ten Seconds To Play! (1955)
13. Fourth Down Showdown (1956)
14. Tournament Crisis (1957)
15. Hardcourt Upset (1957)
16. Pay-off Pitch (1958)

17. No-Hitter (1959)
18. Triple-Threat Trouble (1960)
19. Backcourt Ace (1961)
20. Buzzer Basket (1962)
21. Comeback Cagers (1963)
22. Home Run Feud (1964)
23. Hungry Hurler (1966)
24. Fiery Fullback (2002)

== Spin-offs ==
Beginning in 1997, the NCAA presented The Chip Hilton Player of the Year Award to a Division I men's basketball player who has demonstrated outstanding character, leadership, integrity, humility, sportsmanship and talent both on and off the court, similar to the fictional Chip Hilton character. The award was discontinued following the 2010-11 season.
