= Clair Bee =

American basketball coach (1896–1983)

Biographical details
- Born: March 2, 1896; Pennsboro, West Virginia, U.S.
- Died: May 20, 1983 (aged 87); Cleveland, Ohio, U.S.

Playing career
- 1922–1925: Waynesburg (football, baseball, tennis)

Coaching career (HC unless noted)

Football
- 1929?–1930?: Rider
- 1931: LIU Brooklyn
- 1939–1940: LIU Brooklyn

Basketball
- 1925–1926: High school
- 1928–1931: Rider
- 1931–1943: LIU Brooklyn
- 1945–1951: LIU Brooklyn
- 1952–1954: Baltimore Bullets

Baseball
- 1929: Rider
- 1934–1938: LIU Brooklyn

Administrative career (AD unless noted)
- 1929–1931: Rider
- 1954–1967: New York Military Academy

Head coaching record
- Tournaments: Basketball; 6–5 (NIT)

Accomplishments and honors

Championships
- Basketball; Helms National (1939); 2 NIT (1939, 1941)
- Basketball Hall of Fame; Inducted in 1968 (profile)
- College Basketball Hall of Fame; Inducted in 2006

Clair Francis Bee (March 2, 1896 – May 20, 1983) was an American basketball coach who led the team at Long Island University in Brooklyn, New York to undefeated seasons in 1936 and 1939, as well as two National Invitation Tournament titles in 1939 and 1941.

== Biography ==
Bee was born in Grafton, West Virginia to James Edward Bee (1871–1933) and Margaret Ann Skinner. Later, Bee was a graduate of Waynesburg University (then Waynesburg College) where he played football, baseball, and tennis.

Bee's teams posted a winning record in 21 of his 23 seasons, and compiled a 43-game winning streak from 1935 to 1937. Bee holds the Division I NCAA record for highest winning percentage, winning 83% of the games he was head coach. Bee resigned in 1951 after several of his players were implicated in the CCNY Point Shaving Scandal. LIU shut down its athletic program shortly afterward.

Bee also coached the football team at LIU until it was disbanded in 1940.

He coached the National Basketball Association's Baltimore Bullets from 1952 to 1954, amassing a 34–119 record under his tenure.

Bee was known as the "Innovator". His contributions to the game of basketball include the 1–3–1 zone defense and the three-second rule. Bee also served as co-host of the early NBC sports-oriented television program "Campus Hoopla" on WNBT from 1946 to 1947.

His influence on the game also extended to strategies sports camps (Camp All-America), (Kutsher's Sports Academy), writing technical coaching books, and conducting coaching clinics around the world. By the time he left coaching in the 1950s, Bee had already begun writing the Chip Hilton Sports Series for younger readers.

Bee was inducted into the Basketball Hall of Fame in 1968 and was a member of the Inaugural Class inducted into the NYC Basketball Hall of Fame in 1990. The Clair Bee Coach of the Year Award is awarded every year to a coach who makes an outstanding contribution to the game of college basketball, and the Chip Hilton Player of the Year Award is awarded to a men's basketball player.

In 1968, he cofounded the Kutsher's Sports Academy.

One of Bee's grandfathers was Ephraim Bee, a member of the first West Virginia Legislature.

== Head coaching record ==
=== College ===
==== Football ====
Year	Team	Overall	Conference	Standing	Bowl/playoffs
Rider Roughriders (Independent) (1929?–1930?)
1929	Rider				
1930	Rider				
Rider:					
Long Island Blackbirds (Independent) (1931)
1931	Long Island	7–1			
Long Island Blackbirds (Independent) (1939–1940)
1939	Long Island	5–3			
1940	Long Island	5–1			
Long Island:		17–5			
Total:					

==== Basketball ====
Record table
Season	Team	Overall	Conference	Standing	Postseason
Rider Roughriders (Independent) (1928–1931)
1928–29	Rider	19–3			
1929–30	Rider	17–3			
1930–31	Rider	17–2			
Rider:		53–8 (.869)			
Long Island Blackbirds (Independent) (1931–1943)
1931–32	Long Island	16–4			
1932–33	Long Island	6–11			
1933–34	Long Island	26–1			
1934–35	Long Island	24–2			
1935–36	Long Island	25–0			
1936–37	Long Island	28–3			
1937–38	Long Island	23–5			NIT Quarterfinals
1938–39	Long Island	23–0			Helms Foundation National Champions; NIT Champions
1939–40	Long Island	19–4			NIT Quarterfinals
1940–41	Long Island	25–2			NIT Champions
1941–42	Long Island	25–3			NIT Quarterfinals
1942–43	Long Island	13–6			
1945–46	Long Island	14–9			
1946–47	Long Island	17–5			NIT Quarterfinals
1947–48	Long Island	17–4			
1948–49	Long Island	18–12			
1949–50	Long Island	20–5			NIT Quarterfinals
1950–51	Long Island	20–4			
Long Island:		360–80 (.818)			
Total:		413–88 (.824)			
National champion Postseason invitational champion Conference regular season champion Conference regular season and conference tournament champion Division regular season champion Division regular season and conference tournament champion Conference tournament champion

==== Baseball ====
Record table
Season	Team	Overall	Conference	Standing	Postseason
Rider Roughriders (Independent) (1929)
1929	Rider	3–2			
Rider:		3–2 (.600)			
Long Island Blackbirds (Independent) (1934–1939)
Long Island:		75–22–4 (.762)			
Total:		78–24–4 (.755)			
National champion Postseason invitational champion Conference regular season champion Conference regular season and conference tournament champion Division regular season champion Division regular season and conference tournament champion Conference tournament champion

=== Professional ===
==== NBA ====
Legend
Regular season	G	Games coached	W	Games won	L	Games lost	W–L %	Win–loss %
Playoffs	PG	Playoff games	PW	Playoff wins	PL	Playoff losses	PW–L %	Playoff win–loss %

Team	Year	G	W	L	W–L%	Finish	PG	PW	PL	PW–L%	Result
BAL	1952–53	70	16	54	.229	4th in Eastern	2	0	2	.000	Lost in Div. Semifinals
BAL	1953–54	72	16	56	.222	5th in Eastern	—	—	—	—	Missed Playoffs
BAL	1954–55	11	2	9	.222	Fired; Unofficial Games	—	—	—	—	Folded
Career		142	32	110	.225		2	0	2	.000	
