= Zena Edosomwan =

American basketball player

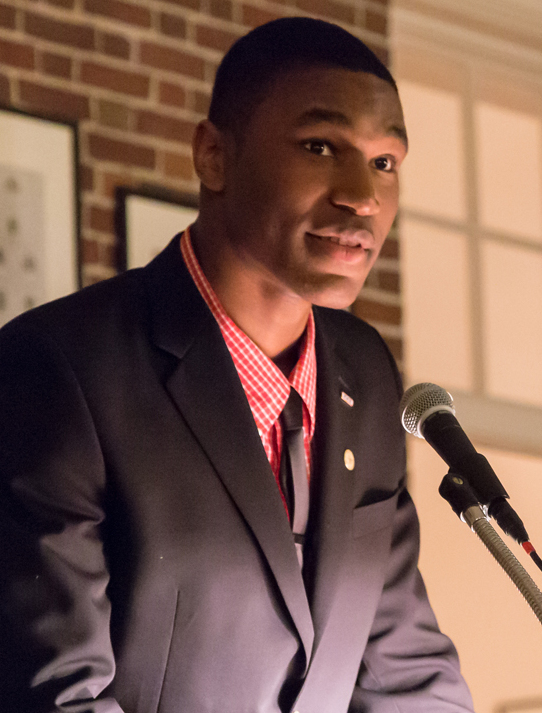
- Edosomwan in March 2013

No. 4 – Gifu Swoops
- Position: Forward
- League: B.League

Personal information
- Born: December 6, 1993 (age 32) Houston, Texas, U.S.
- Listed height: 6 ft 9 in (2.06 m)
- Listed weight: 245 lb (111 kg)

Career information
- High school: Harvard-Westlake (Los Angeles, California); Northfield Mount Hermon (Mount Hermon, Massachusetts)
- College: Harvard (2013–2017)
- NBA draft: 2017: undrafted
- Playing career: 2020–present

Career history
- 2020: Gigantes de Jalisco
- 2021–2022: Sudbury Five
- 2022: Ottawa BlackJacks
- 2022–2023: Helsinki Seagulls
- 2023: Ottawa BlackJacks
- 2023: Krka
- 2023: ABC Fighters
- 2023: Orléans Loiret Basket
- 2024: Denain Voltaire Basket
- 2024: Ottawa BlackJacks
- 2024–present: Gifu Swoops

Career highlights
- Second-team All-Ivy League (2016)

Kinsley Edosomwan (born December 6, 1993) is an American professional basketball player for Gifu Swoops of the B.League. He earned second-team all-conference honors in the Ivy League in 2016. He is the founder and CEO of the Unfiltered Network, which profiles college students of various backgrounds.

== Early life ==
Edosomwan was born in Houston, Texas, and raised in Los Angeles, California, where he started playing basketball at the age of seven. His parents—Muyiya Ololade and Kehinde Ololade—are both Nigerian immigrants, and encouraged Edosomwan to begin playing basketball and prepared him to attend Harvard-Westlake preparatory school in Los Angeles, where he was coached by Greg Hilliard. Edosomwon won a California state title with the school as a senior.

Edosomwan received offers to play basketball from 39 NCAA Division I programs, including Texas and UCLA, but he turned them all down, determined to be accepted by Harvard. He stated his favorite memories of recruiting came when he met academic figures, not sports facilities. As his original SAT scores fell just short of being high enough to earn admission, Edosomwan completed a fifth-year of high school at Northfield Mount Hermon in order to earn admission to the Harvard class of 2017.

== College basketball career ==
Edosomwan was the highest profile high school basketball player to choose to continue his basketball career at Harvard University, and its first top-100 recruit. An East Asian Studies major, the 6 feet 9 inches (2.06 m) forward played in 107 career games for the Crimson, starting 49 of them. As a freshman, Edosamwan averaged 2.9 points per game, improving his scoring somewhat to 4.0 points per game as a sophomore. In addition to basketball, Edosomwan learned the Chinese language and participated in a student-to-student connection in China after his sophomore year, crediting his interest in the culture to having Chinese friends.

Edosomwan had a strong start to his junior season, contributing 13 points and 16 rebounds against Providence, 18 points and 15 rebounds against UMass, and 20 points and 9 rebounds versus Boston College. His best game, however, came against Oklahoma where he had 25 points and 16 rebounds in the final of the Diamond Head Classic. He averaged 13.1 points and 9.9 rebounds per game on a team, depleted by injuries, which finished with Harvard's first losing record since 2008. Edosomwon was named to the Second-team All-Ivy League as a junior. He was named to the Kareem Abdul-Jabbar preseason watchlist in for 2016–2017. As a senior, he averaged 7.0 points and a team-high 6.3 rebounds per game.

== Professional basketball career ==
In 2020, Edosomwan signed with Mexican team Gigantes de Jalisco of the Circuito de Baloncesto de la Costa del Pacífico (CIBACOPA), which the Guadalajara-based club announced via their Twitter account in March. He made his debut on March 13 as a member of the starting lineup in the home opener against Venados de Mazatlán. He played in only one more game, also against Mazatlán, before the season was postponed due to the COVID-19 pandemic.

In October 2021, Edosomwan made the training camp roster for the Raptors 905 of the NBA G-League, however was waived a few days later.

In December 2021, he signed with the Sudbury Five of the National Basketball League of Canada (NBLC). He averaged 16.8 points, 11.4 rebounds, and 1.2 blocks per game in 17 appearances.

In May 2022 following the end of the NBL Canada season, Edosomwan signed with the Ottawa BlackJacks of the rival Canadian Elite Basketball League (CEBL).

After a yearlong stint with the Helsinki Seagulls of the Korisliiga and a second with Ottawa, Edosowan signed with Krka of the Slovenian First League and the ABA League on August 16, 2023.

On July 11, 2024, Edosomwan signed with the Gifu Swoops of the B.League.

== Unfiltered Network ==
Edosomwan became the CEO of the Unfiltered Network, a media company that he created which profiles college students—including many athletes—of different backgrounds, races, religions and ethnicities. He started the company after Harvard's basketball season ended in his senior year in 2017. As of 2017, the network had spread to over 50 college campuses.
