= 2015 National Invitation Tournament =

Single-elimination basketball tournament

- Season: 2014–15
- Teams: 32
- Finals site: Madison Square Garden, New York City
- Champions: Stanford Cardinal (3rd title)
- Runner-up: Miami Hurricanes (1st title game)
- Semifinalists: Temple Owls (5th semifinal); Old Dominion Monarchs (2nd semifinal)
- Winning coach: Johnny Dawkins (2nd title)
- MVP: Chasson Randle (Stanford)
- Attendance: 117,911 (Total); 6,600 (Title game)
- Top scorers: 1 (1); 1 (1) (1 points)

The 2015 National Invitation Tournament was a single-elimination tournament of 32 NCAA Division I teams that were not selected to participate in the 2015 NCAA tournament. The annual tournament is being played on campus sites for the first three rounds, with the Final Four and championship game being held at Madison Square Garden in New York City. The tournament began on Tuesday, March 17 and ended on Thursday, April 2. On February 6, the NCAA announced the 2015 NIT will use a 30-second shot clock (same as its WNIT counterpart) and a 4-foot (1.2 m) restricted-area arc as experimental rules for the 2015 tournament. On March 4, the NCAA announced teams that are marked as the first four teams left out of the 2015 NCAA tournament field will be the top-seeded teams in the 2015 NIT.

== Participants ==
=== Automatic qualifiers ===
The following teams earned automatic berths into the 2015 NIT field by virtue of having won their respective conference's regular season championship but failing to win their conference tournaments or receive an at-large NCAA bid.

Team	Conference	Record	Appearance	Last bid
Bucknell	Patriot	19–14	2nd	2012
Central Michigan	Mid-American	23–8	2nd	1979
Charleston Southern	Big South	19–11	2nd	2013
Iona	MAAC	26–8	6th	2014
Louisiana Tech	C-USA	25–8	9th	2014
Montana	Big Sky	20–12	4th	1995
Murray State	Ohio Valley	27–5	8th	2011
North Carolina Central	MEAC	25–7	1st	Never
South Dakota State	Summit	23–10	1st	Never
St. Francis Brooklyn	Northeast	23–11	4th	1963
UC Davis	Big West	25–6	1st	Never
William & Mary	Colonial	20–12	3rd	2010

=== At-large bids ===
The following 20 teams were also awarded NIT berths.

Team	Conference	Record	Appearance	Last bid
Alabama	SEC	18–14	13th	2013
Arizona State	Pac-12	17–15	13th	2013
Colorado State	Mountain West	27–6	8th	2011
George Washington	Atlantic 10	21–12	5th	2004
Green Bay	Horizon	24–8	4th	2014
Illinois	Big Ten	19–13	6th	2014
Illinois State	Missouri Valley	21–12	13th	2012
Miami (FL)	ACC	21–12	11th	2012
Old Dominion	C-USA	24–7	11th	2006
Pittsburgh	ACC	19–14	9th	2001
Rhode Island	Atlantic 10	22–9	15th	2010
Richmond	Atlantic 10	19–13	8th	2008
Saint Mary's	West Coast	21–9	4th	2014
Stanford	Pac-12	19–13	8th	2013
Temple	American	23–10	17th	2006
Texas A&M	SEC	20–11	7th	2005
Tulsa	American	22–10	10th	2010
UConn	American	20–14	13th	2010
UTEP	C-USA	22–10	10th	2011
Vanderbilt	SEC	19–13	12th	2006

=== Seeds ===
Old Dominion bracket
Seed	School	Conference	Record	Berth type
1	Old Dominion	C-USA	24–7	At-large
2	Tulsa	American	22–10	At-large
3	Murray State	Ohio Valley	27–5	Automatic
4	Illinois State	Missouri Valley	21–12	At-large
5	Green Bay	Horizon	24–8	At-large
6	UTEP	C-USA	22–10	At-large
7	William & Mary	Colonial	20–12	Automatic
8	Charleston Southern	Big South	19–11	Automatic

Temple bracket
Seed	School	Conference	Record	Berth type
1	Temple	American	23–10	At-large
2	Texas A&M	SEC	20–11	At-large
3	Louisiana Tech	C-USA	25–8	Automatic
4	Pittsburgh	ACC	19–14	At-large
5	George Washington	Atlantic 10	21–12	At-large
6	Central Michigan	MAC	23–8	Automatic
7	Montana	Big Sky	20–12	Automatic
8	Bucknell	Patriot	19–14	Automatic

Richmond bracket
Seed	School	Conference	Record	Berth type
1	Richmond	Atlantic 10	19–13	At-large
2	Miami (FL)	ACC	21–12	At-large
3	Illinois	Big Ten	19–13	At-large
4	UConn	American	20–14	At-large
5	Arizona State	Pac-12	17–15	At-large
6	Alabama	SEC	18–14	At-large
7	North Carolina Central	MEAC	25–7	Automatic
8	St. Francis Brooklyn	Northeast	23–11	Automatic

Colorado State bracket
Seed	School	Conference	Record	Berth type
1	Colorado State	Mountain West	27–6	At-large
2	Stanford	Pac-12	19–13	At-large
3	Rhode Island	Atlantic 10	22–9	At-large
4	Saint Mary's	West Coast	21–9	At-large
5	Vanderbilt	SEC	19–13	At-large
6	Iona	MAAC	26–8	Automatic
7	UC Davis	Big West	25–6	Automatic
8	South Dakota State	Summit	23–10	Automatic

== Schedule ==
Date	Time*	Matchup	Television	Score	Attendance
First round
March 17	7:00 pm	#5 George Washington at #4 Pittsburgh	ESPN	60–54	3,049
March 17	7:00 pm	#7 N.C. Central at #2 Miami (FL)	ESPN2	71–75	1,612
March 17	7:00 pm	#6 Iona at #3 Rhode Island	ESPNU	75–88	2,638
March 17	7:30 pm	#6 Central Michigan at #3 Louisiana Tech	ESPN3	79–89	6,904
March 17	8:15 pm	#7 William & Mary at #2 Tulsa	ESPN3	67–70	2,547
March 17	9:00 pm	#6 UTEP at #3 Murray State	ESPN2	66–81	3,376
March 17	9:00 pm	#7 Montana at #2 Texas A&M	ESPNU	64–81	2,583
March 17	9:00 pm	#3 Illinois at #6 Alabama	ESPN	58–79	2,348
March 17	11:00 pm	#7 UC Davis at #2 Stanford	ESPN2	64–77	1,436
March 18	7:00 pm	#8 Bucknell at #1 Temple	ESPN3	67–73	3,882
March 18	7:00 pm	#5 Arizona State at #4 UConn	ESPN2	68–61	6,045
March 18	7:15 pm	#8 Charleston Southern at #1 Old Dominion	ESPN3	56–65	4,736
March 18	7:30 pm	#8 St. Francis Brooklyn at #1 Richmond	ESPN3	74–84	3,624
March 18	8:00 pm	#5 Green Bay at #4 Illinois State	ESPNU	56–69	4,942
March 18	9:00 pm	#5 Vanderbilt at #4 Saint Mary's	ESPN2	75–64	1,322
March 18	10:00 pm	#8 South Dakota State at #1 Colorado State	ESPNU	86–76	3,391
Second round
March 20	9:30 pm	#8 South Dakota State at #5 Vanderbilt	ESPNU	77–92	5,605
March 21	11:00 am	#6 Alabama @ #2 Miami (FL)	ESPN	66–73	1,979
March 22	11:00 am	#5 George Washington @ #1 Temple	ESPN	77–90	3,404
March 22	7:30 pm	#5 Arizona State @ #1 Richmond	ESPNU	70–76	4,507
March 22	9:30 pm	#3 Rhode Island @ #2 Stanford	ESPNU	65–74	1,235
March 23	7:00 pm	#3 Louisiana Tech @ #2 Texas A&M	ESPN	84–72	3,859
March 23	8:00 pm	#4 Illinois State @ #1 Old Dominion	ESPNU	49–50	5,923
March 23	9:00 pm	#3 Murray State @ #2 Tulsa	ESPN	83–62	3,440
Quarterfinals
March 24	7:00 pm	#2 Miami (FL) @ #1 Richmond	ESPN	63–61	6,126
March 24	9:00 pm	#5 Vanderbilt @ #2 Stanford	ESPN	75–78	1,546
March 25	9:00 pm	#3 Louisiana Tech @ #1 Temple	ESPN2	59–77	3,906
March 25	7:00 pm	#3 Murray State @ #1 Old Dominion	ESPN2	69–72	8,161
Semifinals
March 31	7:00 pm	#1Temple vs. #2 Miami (FL)	ESPN	57–60	7,185
March 31	9:00 pm	#2 Stanford vs. #1 Old Dominion	ESPN	67–60	7,185
Championship game
April 2	9:00 pm	#2 Stanford vs. #2 Miami (FL)	ESPN	66–64 (OT)	6,600

*Game times in Eastern Time. #Rankings denote tournament seeding.

== Bracket ==
The following teams were listed as the "First Four Out" of the NCAA tournament and received #1 seeds: Old Dominion, Richmond, Temple, Colorado State.

First round March 17–18
1	Old Dominion	65
8	Charleston Southern	56
4	Illinois State	69
5	Green Bay	56
2	Tulsa	70
7	William & Mary	67
3	Murray State	81
6	UTEP	66

Second round March 23
1	Old Dominion	50
4	Illinois State	49
2	Tulsa	62
3	Murray State	83

Quarterfinals; March 25
1	Old Dominion	72
3	Murray State	69

First round March 17–18
1	Richmond	84
8	St. Francis Brooklyn	74
4	UConn	61
5	Arizona State	68
2	Miami (FL)	75
7	North Carolina Central	71
3	Illinois^	58
6	Alabama	79

Second round March 21–22
1	Richmond	76
5	Arizona State	70
2	Miami (FL)	73
6	Alabama	66

Quarterfinals; March 24
1	Richmond	61
2	Miami (FL)	63

#3 Illinois played at #6 Alabama due to State Farm Center renovations.

First round March 17–18
1	Temple	73
8	Bucknell	67
4	Pittsburgh	54
5	George Washington	60
2	Texas A&M	81
7	Montana	64
3	Louisiana Tech	89
6	Central Michigan	79

Second round March 22–23
1	Temple	90
5	George Washington	77
2	Texas A&M	72
3	Louisiana Tech	84

Quarterfinals; March 25
1	Temple	77
3	Louisiana Tech	59

First round March 17–18
1	Colorado State	76
8	South Dakota State	86
4	Saint Mary's	64
5	Vanderbilt	75
2	Stanford	77
7	UC Davis	64
3	Rhode Island	88
6	Iona	75

Second round March 20–22
8	South Dakota State	77
5	Vanderbilt	92
2	Stanford	74
3	Rhode Island	65

Quarterfinals; March 24
5	Vanderbilt	75
2	Stanford	78

Semifinals; March 31
1	Temple	57
2	Miami (FL)	60
2	Stanford	67
1	Old Dominion	60

Final; April 2
2	Miami (FL)	64
2	Stanford	66*

* Denotes overtime period

== Media ==
ESPN, Inc. has exclusive television rights to all NIT games. It will telecast every game across ESPN, ESPN2, ESPNU and ESPN3. Since 2011, Westwood One has held exclusive radio rights to the semifinals and championship. In 2015, Dave Ryan and Kelly Tripucka called these games for Westwood One.

== See also ==
- 2015 Women's National Invitation Tournament
- 2015 NCAA Division I men's basketball tournament
- 2015 NCAA Division II men's basketball tournament
- 2015 NCAA Division III men's basketball tournament
- 2015 NCAA Division I women's basketball tournament
- 2015 NCAA Division II women's basketball tournament
- 2015 NCAA Division III women's basketball tournament
- 2015 NAIA Division I men's basketball tournament
- 2015 NAIA Division II men's basketball tournament
- 2015 College Basketball Invitational
- 2015 CollegeInsider.com Postseason Tournament
