= 2014–15 Boston University Terriers men's basketball team =

American college basketball season

2014–15 Boston University Terriers men's basketball
- Conference: Patriot League
- Record: 13–17 (9–9 Patriot)
- Head coach: Joe Jones (4th season)
- Assistant coaches: Curtis Wilson; Shaun Morris; Walt Corbean
- Home arena: Agganis Arena; Case Gym

2014–15 Patriot League men's basketball standings
	Conf.				Overall
Team	W		L	PCT	W		L	PCT
Bucknell	13	–	5	.722	19	–	15	.559
Colgate	12	–	6	.667	16	–	17	.485
Lehigh	10	–	8	.556	16	–	14	.533
Lafayette †	9	–	9	.500	20	–	13	.606
Boston University	9	–	9	.500	13	–	17	.433
American	8	–	10	.444	17	–	16	.515
Holy Cross	8	–	10	.444	14	–	16	.467
Navy	8	–	10	.444	13	–	19	.406
Loyola (MD)	7	–	11	.389	11	–	19	.367
Army	6	–	12	.333	15	–	15	.500
† 2015 Patriot League tournament winner

The 2014–15 Boston University Terriers men's basketball team represented Boston University during the 2014–15 NCAA Division I men's basketball season. The Terriers, led by fourth year head coach Joe Jones, played their home games at Agganis Arena, with early season games at Case Gym, and were members of the Patriot League. They finished the season 13–17, 9–9 in Patriot League play to finish in a tie for fourth place. They lost in the quarterfinals of the Patriot League tournament to Lafayette.

== Previous season ==
The Terriers finished the season 24–11, 15–3 in Patriot League play to win the Patriot League regular season championship. They advanced to the championship game of the Patriot League tournament where they lost to American. As a regular season league champion who failed to win their league tournament, they received an automatic bid to the National Invitation Tournament where they lost in the first round to Illinois.

== Roster ==
2014–15 Boston University Terriers men's basketball team
Players
Coaches

Pos.	#	Name	Height	Weight	Year	Hometown
G	0	Eric Johnson	6 ft 2 in (1.88 m)	180 lb (82 kg)	Fr	Martinsville, Virginia
F	1	Nick Havener	6 ft 8 in (2.03 m)	200 lb (91 kg)	Fr	Sarasota, Florida
G	2	John Papale (C)	6 ft 3 in (1.91 m)	190 lb (86 kg)	Jr	Wallingford, Connecticut
G	3	Eric Fanning	6 ft 5 in (1.96 m)	190 lb (86 kg)	So	Trenton, New Jersey
G	5	Blaise Mbargorba	6 ft 11 in (2.11 m)	210 lb (95 kg)	So	Hightstown, New Jersey
G	13	Will Goff	6 ft 4 in (1.93 m)	175 lb (79 kg)	Fr	Scottsdale, Arizona
F	14	Braiten Madrigal (W)	6 ft 4 in (1.93 m)	180 lb (82 kg)	So	Downey, California
G	15	Cheddi Mosely	6 ft 3 in (1.91 m)	175 lb (79 kg)	Fr	Oceanport, New Jersey
G	20	Cameron Curry (W)	5 ft 9 in (1.75 m)	170 lb (77 kg)	So	West Covina, California
G	21	Cedric Hankerson	6 ft 5 in (1.96 m)	190 lb (86 kg)	So	Miami, Florida
F	22	Nathan Dieudonne (C)	6 ft 7 in (2.01 m)	210 lb (95 kg)	Jr	Louisville, Kentucky
G	25	Dylan Brossman (W)	5 ft 9 in (1.75 m)	160 lb (73 kg)	Sr	Reamstown, Pennsylvania
F	32	Justin Alston (C)	6 ft 8 in (2.03 m)	220 lb (100 kg)	Jr	Washington, D.C.
F	41	Dylan Haines	7 ft 0 in (2.13 m)	230 lb (104 kg)	So	Liverpool, New York

Head coach

- Joe Jones (SUNY–Oswego)

Assistant coach(es)

- Shaun Morris (Lycoming)
- Curtis Wilson (Adelphi)
- Walt Corbean (Northern Kentucky)

Legend

- (C) Team captain
- (S) Suspended
- (I) Ineligible
- (W) Walk-on
- Injured
- Current redshirt

Roster

== Schedule ==
Date time, TV	Rank^{#}	Opponent^{#}	Result	Record	Site (attendance) city, state
Non-conference regular season
11/16/2014*; 12:30 pm, NESN		vs. Northeastern; Coaches vs. Cancer Tripleheader	L 65–71	0–1	TD Garden (5,112); Boston, MA
11/19/2014*; 7:00 pm		at Norfolk State	W 71–63	1–1	Joseph G. Echols Memorial Hall (1,100); Norfolk, VA
11/21/2014*; 7:00 pm, FSN		at No. 1 Kentucky	L 65–89	1–2	Rupp Arena (22,485); Lexington, KY
11/25/2014*; 7:00 pm		at New Hampshire	L 68–75	1–3	Lundholm Gym (515); Durham, NH
11/30/2014*; 1:00 pm		UMass Lowell	L 59–69	1–4	Case Gym (407); Boston, MA
12/03/2014*; 7:30 pm		Binghamton	W 77–65	2–4	Case Gym (723); Boston, MA
12/06/2014*; 2:00 pm		Saint Peter's	L 59–70	2–5	Case Gym (361); Boston, MA
12/08/2014*; 7:00 pm		at Harvard	L 56–70	2–6	Lavietes Pavilion (1,311); Cambridge, MA
12/14/2014*; 1:00 pm		Quinnipiac	W 71–68	3–6	Case Gym (394); Boston, MA
12/20/2014*; 7:00 pm		at Dayton	L 62–78	3–7	University of Dayton Arena (12,326); Dayton, OH
12/29/2014*; 7:00 pm		Wentworth	W 69–46	4–7	Case Gym (247); Boston, MA
Conference regular season
12/31/2014; 2:00 pm		at Holy Cross	W 75–72 ^{OT}	5–7 (1–0)	Hart Center (1,792); Worcester, MA
01/03/2015; 1:00 pm		Lehigh	W 75–56	6–7 (2–0)	Case Gym (340); Boston, MA
01/07/2015; 8:00 pm, ASN		at Navy	W 70–64	7–7 (3–0)	Alumni Hall (1,153); Annapolis, MD
01/10/2015; 1:00 pm		Lafayette	L 62–63	7–8 (3–1)	Agganis Arena (738); Boston, MA
01/14/2015; 7:00 pm		at Colgate	L 53–62	7–9 (3–2)	Cotterell Court (712); Hamilton, NY
01/18/2015; 1:00 pm		at Loyola (MD)	L 86–91 ^{OT}	7–10 (3–3)	Reitz Arena (657); Baltimore, MD
01/21/2015; 7:00 pm		American	W 59–54	8–10 (4–3)	Agganis Arena (537); Boston, MA
01/24/2015; 1:00 pm		Bucknell	L 77–92	8–11 (4–4)	Agganis Arena (690); Boston, MA
01/28/2015; 7:00 pm		at Army	L 67–71	8–12 (4–5)	Christl Arena (701); West Point, NY
01/31/2015; 2:00 pm		at Lehigh	L 86–89	8–13 (4–6)	Stabler Arena (1,423); Bethlehem, PA
02/04/2015; 7:00 pm		Navy	W 62–59	9–13 (5–6)	Agganis Arena (315); Boston, MA
02/09/2015; 7:00 pm, CBSSN		at Lafayette	W 74–60	10–13 (6–6)	Kirby Sports Center (1,587); Easton, PA
02/11/2015; 8:00 pm, ASN		Colgate	L 69–76	10–14 (6–7)	Agganis Arena (328); Boston, MA
02/14/2015; 1:00 pm		Loyola (MD)	W 73–60	11–14 (7–7)	Agganis Arena (469); Boston, MA
02/18/2015; 7:00 pm, CBSSN		at American	W 61–53	12–14 (8–7)	Bender Arena (1,176); Washington, D.C.
02/22/2015; 12:00 pm		Bucknell	L 69–78	12–15 (8–8)	Sojka Pavilion (3,156); Lewisburg, PA
02/25/2015; 7:00 pm		Army	W 63–57	13–15 (9–8)	Agganis Arena (593); Boston, MA
02/28/2015; 12:00 pm		Holy Cross	L 70–77	13–16 (9–9)	Agganis Arena (1,121); Boston, MA
Patriot League tournament
03/05/2015; 7:00 pm	(5)	at (4) Lafayette; Quarterfinals	L 64–89	13–17	Kirby Sports Center (1,648); Easton, PA
*Non-conference game. ^{#}Rankings from AP Poll. (#) Tournament seedings in parentheses. All times are in Eastern Time.
