= 2014–15 Temple Owls men's basketball team =

American college basketball season

2014–15 Temple Owls men's basketball

NIT, Semifinals
- Conference: American Athletic Conference
- Record: 26–11 (13–5 The American)
- Head coach: Fran Dunphy (9th season)
- Assistant coaches: Dave Duke; Dwayne Killings; Shawn Trice; Aaron McKie
- Home arena: Liacouras Center; Wells Fargo Center (1 game only)

2014–15 American Athletic Conference men's basketball standings
	Conf.				Overall
Team	W		L	PCT	W		L	PCT
No. 18 SMU †	15	–	3	.833	27	–	7	.794
Tulsa	14	–	4	.778	23	–	11	.676
Temple	13	–	5	.722	26	–	11	.703
Cincinnati	13	–	5	.722	23	–	11	.676
UConn	10	–	8	.556	20	–	15	.571
Memphis	10	–	8	.556	18	–	14	.563
Tulane	6	–	12	.333	15	–	16	.484
East Carolina	6	–	12	.333	14	–	19	.424
UCF	5	–	13	.278	12	–	18	.400
Houston	4	–	14	.222	13	–	19	.406
South Florida	3	–	15	.167	9	–	23	.281
† The American Tournament winner Rankings from AP poll

The 2014–15 Temple Owls basketball team represented Temple University during the 2014–15 NCAA Division I men's basketball season. The Owls, led by ninth year head coach Fran Dunphy, played their home games at the Liacouras Center and were members the American Athletic Conference. They finished the season 26–11, 13–5 in AAC play, to finish in a tie for third place. They advanced to the semifinals of the American Athletic tournament to SMU. They were invited to the National Invitation Tournament, where they defeated Bucknell in the first round, George Washington in the second round, and Louisiana Tech in the quarterfinals, to advance to the semifinals, where they lost to Miami (FL).

== Previous season ==
The Owls finished the season 9–22, 4–14 in AAC play, to finish in a tie for eighth place. They lost in the first round of the AAC tournament to UCF.

== Departures ==
Name	Number	Pos.	Height	Weight	Year	Hometown	Notes
Anthony Lee	3	F	6'9"	230	Junior	Columbia, MD	Graduate transfer to Ohio State
Dalton Pepper	32	G	6'5"	220	Senior	Levittown, PA	Graduated

=== Incoming transfers ===
Name	Number	Pos.	Height	Weight	Year	Hometown	Previous school
Devin Coleman	34	G	6'2"	205	RS junior	Philadelphia, PA	Transferred from Clemson during the 2013-14 season. Under NCAA transfer rules, Coleman would have to sit out for the first semester of the 2014–15 season, and would have one and a half years of remaining eligibility.

== Incoming recruits ==
College recruiting
Name	Hometown	School	Height	Weight	Commit date
Obi Enechionyia; PF	Springfield, VA	St. James School	6 ft 8 in (2.03 m)	220 lb (100 kg)	Sep 8, 2013
Obi Enechionyia; PF	Recruit ratings: Scout: Rivals: (80)				
Overall recruit ranking:
Note: In many cases, Scout, Rivals, 247Sports, On3, and ESPN may conflict in their listings of height and weight.; In these cases, the average was taken. ESPN grades are on a 100-point scale.; Sources: "2014 Team Ranking". Rivals.

=== Recruiting class of 2015 ===
College recruiting
Name	Hometown	School	Height	Weight	Commit date
Levan Alston; SG	Haverford, Pa	The Haverford School	6 ft 4 in (1.93 m)	175 lb (79 kg)	Nov 12, 2014
Levan Alston; SG	Recruit ratings: Scout: Rivals: (82)				
Ernest Aflakpui; C	Radnor, Pa	Archbishop Carroll High School	6 ft 10 in (2.08 m)	220 lb (100 kg)	Oct 12, 2014
Ernest Aflakpui; C	Recruit ratings: Scout: Rivals: (80)				
Trey Lowe; SG	Ewing, NJ	Ewing High School	6 ft 5 in (1.96 m)	165 lb (75 kg)	Aug 7, 2014
Trey Lowe; SG	Recruit ratings: Scout: Rivals: (80)				
Overall recruit ranking:
Note: In many cases, Scout, Rivals, 247Sports, On3, and ESPN may conflict in their listings of height and weight.; In these cases, the average was taken. ESPN grades are on a 100-point scale.; Sources: "2015 Team Ranking". Rivals.

== Roster ==
2014–15 Temple Owls men's basketball team
Players
Coaches

Pos.	#	Name	Height	Weight	Year	Previous school	Hometown
F	0	Obi Enechionyia	6 ft 8 in (2.03 m)	220 lb (100 kg)	Fr	St. James School	Springfield, VA
G	1	Josh Brown	6 ft 3 in (1.91 m)	185 lb (84 kg)	So	St. Anthony (NJ)	Irvington, NJ
G	2	Will Cummings	6 ft 2 in (1.88 m)	175 lb (79 kg)	Sr	Providence School	Jacksonville, FL
G	3	Jesse Morgan	6 ft 5 in (1.96 m)	190 lb (86 kg)	GS	Massachusetts; Olney	Philadelphia, PA
G/F	4	Daniel Dingle	6 ft 7 in (2.01 m)	225 lb (102 kg)	RS So	St. Raymond	Bronx, NY
F	10	Mark Williams	6 ft 8 in (2.03 m)	240 lb (109 kg)	So	Montrose Christian	Cleveland, OH
G	11	Mike Robbins	6 ft 4 in (1.93 m)	185 lb (84 kg)	So	Lower Merion	Wynnewood, PA
F	13	Nick Pendergast	6 ft 5 in (1.96 m)	180 lb (82 kg)	RS Jr	Kent	Bridgewater, CT
F	15	Jaylen Bond	6 ft 8 in (2.03 m)	240 lb (109 kg)	RS Jr	Texas; Plymouth-Whitemarsh	Philadelphia, PA
F/C	23	Devontae Watson	6 ft 10 in (2.08 m)	210 lb (95 kg)	Jr	Lincoln Park Performing Arts	Ambridge, PA
G	25	Quenton DeCosey	6 ft 5 in (1.96 m)	180 lb (82 kg)	Jr	St. Joseph, Metuchen, NJ	Union, NJ
G	34	Devin Coleman	6 ft 2 in (1.88 m)	205 lb (93 kg)	RS Jr	Clemson; Friends' Central	Philadelphia, PA
F	41	Jimmy McDonnell	6 ft 10 in (2.08 m)	210 lb (95 kg)	RS Sr	Jackson Memorial	Jackson, NJ
F	50	Chima Nwakpuda	6 ft 4 in (1.93 m)	215 lb (98 kg)	Jr	Millersville; Shipley	Philadelphia, PA

Head coach

- Fran Dunphy

Assistant coach(es)

- Dave Duke
- Dwayne Killings
- Shawn Trice
- Aaron McKie

Legend

- (C) Team captain
- (S) Suspended
- (I) Ineligible
- (W) Walk-on
- Injured
- Current redshirt

Roster
Last update: November 27, 2014

== Schedule and results ==
Date time, TV	Rank^{#}	Opponent^{#}	Result	Record	Site (attendance) city, state
Regular season
November 14, 2014*; 7:00 pm, ESPN3		American; Coaches vs. Cancer Classic	W 40–37	1–0	Liacouras Center (5,655); Philadelphia, PA
November 17, 2014*; 7:00 pm, ESPN3		Louisiana Tech; Coaches vs. Cancer Classic	W 82–75	2–0	Liacouras Center (4,237); Philadelphia, PA
November 21, 2014*; 9:30 pm, TruTV		vs. No. 4 Duke; Coaches vs. Cancer Classic Semifinals	L 54–74	2–1	Barclays Center (10,135); Brooklyn, NY
November 22, 2014*; 7:00 pm, TruTV		vs. UNLV; Coaches vs. Cancer Classic Consolation	L 50–57	2–2	Barclays Center (10,046); Brooklyn, NY
November 25, 2014*; 7:00 pm, ESPN3		Penn; Philadelphia Big 5	W 76–67	3–2	Liacouras Center (4,292); Philadelphia, PA
November 30, 2014*; 4:00 pm, ESPN3		LIU Brooklyn	W 70–56	4–2	Liacouras Center (3,852); Philadelphia, PA
December 3, 2014*; 6:30 pm, CBSSN		at Saint Joseph's; Rivalry/Philadelphia Big 5	L 56–58	4–3	Hagan Arena (4,200); Philadelphia, PA
December 6, 2014*; 12:00 pm, ESPNews		vs. La Salle	W 58–57	5–3	Palestra (7,445); Philadelphia, PA
December 10, 2014*; 8:00 pm, ESPN3		Towson	W 76–64	6–3	Liacouras Center (2,308); Philadelphia, PA
December 14, 2014*; 2:00 pm, FS1		at No. 7 Villanova; Philadelphia Big 5	L 62–85	6–4	The Pavilion (6,500); Villanova, PA
December 18, 2014*; 7:00 pm		at Delaware	W 82–62	7–4	Bob Carpenter Center (2,182); Newark, DE
December 22, 2014*; 7:00 pm, ESPN2		vs. No. 10 Kansas	W 77–52	8–4	Wells Fargo Center (11,188); Philadelphia, PA
December 28, 2014*; 5:00 pm, ESPN3		Delaware State	W 66–56	9–4	Liacouras Center (4,642); Philadelphia, PA
December 31, 2014; 1:00 pm, ESPN2		at UConn	W 57–53 ^{OT}	10–4 (1–0)	XL Center (13,428); Hartford, CT
January 4, 2015; 12:00 pm, ESPNews		UCF	W 84–78	11–4 (2–0)	Liacouras Center (4,008); Philadelphia, PA
January 7, 2015; 7:00 pm, ESPNews		at Tulane	W 64–56	12–4 (3–0)	Devlin Fieldhouse (2,875); New Orleans, LA
January 10, 2015; 3:00 pm, ESPNews		Tulsa	L 56–63	12–5 (3–1)	Liacouras Center (6,012); Philadelphia, PA
January 14, 2015; 7:00 pm, CBSSN		SMU	L 55–60	12–6 (3–2)	Liacouras Center (7,695); Philadelphia, PA
January 17, 2015; 7:30 pm, ESPNU		at Cincinnati	L 53–84	12–7 (3–3)	Fifth Third Arena (12,071); Cincinnati, OH
January 22, 2015; 6:30 pm, ESPNews		South Florida	W 73–48	13–7 (4–3)	Liacouras Center (5,352); Philadelphia, PA
January 28, 2015; 7:00 pm, CBSSN		at UCF	W 86–62	14–7 (5–3)	CFE Arena (4,224); Orlando, FL
January 31, 2015; 12:00 pm, CBSSN		Tulane	W 55–37	15–7 (6–3)	Liacouras Center (7,254); Philadelphia, PA
February 4, 2015; 6:30 pm, ESPNews		at South Florida	W 61–48	16–7 (7–3)	USF Sun Dome (3,249); Tampa, FL
February 7, 2015; 1:00 pm, ESPNews		at Memphis	W 61–60	17–7 (8–3)	FedEx Forum (14,381); Memphis, TN
February 10, 2015; 7:30 pm, CBSSN		Cincinnati	W 75–59	18–7 (9–3)	Liacouras Center (6,603); Philadelphia, PA
February 14, 2015; 2:00 pm, CBSSN		East Carolina	W 66–53	19–7 (10–3)	Liacouras Center (8,121); Philadelphia, PA
February 19, 2015; 7:00 pm, ESPN2		at No. 21 SMU	L 58–67	19–8 (10–4)	Moody Coliseum (6,852); Dallas, TX
February 22, 2015; 6:00 pm, ESPNU		at Tulsa	L 39–55	19–9 (10–5)	Reynolds Center (5,130); Tulsa, OK
February 26, 2015; 7:00 pm, CBSSN		Houston	W 61–54	20–9 (11–5)	Liacouras Center (7,023); Philadelphia, PA
March 5, 2015; 7:00 pm, ESPNU		at East Carolina	W 70–56	21–9 (12–5)	Williams Arena (4,790); Greenville, NC
March 7, 2015; 2:00 pm, ESPN2		UConn	W 75–63	22–9 (13–5)	Liacouras Center (10,206); Philadelphia, PA
American Athletic Conference tournament
March 13, 2015; 2:00 pm, ESPN2		vs. Memphis; Quarterfinals	W 80–75	23–9	XL Center (N/A); Hartford, CT
March 14, 2015; 3:00 pm, ESPN2		vs. No. 20 SMU; Semifinals	L 56–69	23–10	XL Center (10,114); Hartford, CT
NIT
March 18, 2015*; 7:00 pm, ESPN3	No. (1)	(8) Bucknell; First round	W 73–67	24–10	Liacouras Center (3,882); Philadelphia, PA
March 22, 2015*; 11:00 am, ESPN	No. (1)	(5) George Washington; Second round	W 90–77	25–10	Liacouras Center (3,404); Philadelphia, PA
March 25, 2015*; 9:00 pm, ESPN2	No. (1)	(3) Louisiana Tech; Quarterfinals	W 77–59	26–10	Liacouras Center (3,906); Philadelphia, PA
March 31, 2015*; 7:00 pm, ESPN	No. (1)	vs. (2) Miami (FL); Semifinals	L 57–60	26–11	Madison Square Garden (7,185); New York, NY
*Non-conference game. ^{#}Rankings from AP Poll. (#) Tournament seedings in parentheses. All times are in Eastern Time. (#) during NIT is seed within region.

== Awards ==
Will Cummings was named to the First Team All-AAC. Jaylen Bond was an Honorable Mention All-AAC.
