= 2014–15 Loyola Greyhounds men's basketball team =

American college basketball season

2014–15 Loyola Greyhounds men's basketball
- Conference: Patriot League
- Record: 11–19 (7–11 Patriot)
- Head coach: G.G. Smith (2nd season)
- Assistant coaches: Keith Booth; Josh Loeffler; Dan Ficke
- Home arena: Reitz Arena

2014–15 Patriot League men's basketball standings
	Conf.				Overall
Team	W		L	PCT	W		L	PCT
Bucknell	13	–	5	.722	19	–	15	.559
Colgate	12	–	6	.667	16	–	17	.485
Lehigh	10	–	8	.556	16	–	14	.533
Lafayette †	9	–	9	.500	20	–	13	.606
Boston University	9	–	9	.500	13	–	17	.433
American	8	–	10	.444	17	–	16	.515
Holy Cross	8	–	10	.444	14	–	16	.467
Navy	8	–	10	.444	13	–	19	.406
Loyola (MD)	7	–	11	.389	11	–	19	.367
Army	6	–	12	.333	15	–	15	.500
† 2015 Patriot League tournament winner

The 2014–15 Loyola Greyhounds men's basketball team represented Loyola University Maryland during the 2014–15 NCAA Division I men's basketball season. The Greyhounds, led by second year head coach G.G. Smith, played their home games at Reitz Arena and were members of the Patriot League. They finished the season 11–19, 7–11 in Patriot League play to finish in ninth place. They lost in the first round of the Patriot League tournament to Holy Cross.

== Roster ==
Number	Name	Position	Height	Weight	Year	Hometown
1	Nick Gorski	Forward	6–9	224	Sophomore	Richmond, Virginia
2	Andre Walker	Guard	6–0	160	Freshman	Westbury, New York
4	Stefano Mancini	Guard	6–2	175	RS–Junior	Falmouth, Maine
5	Eric Laster	Guard	6–6	195	Junior	Smyrna, Delaware
10	Denzel Brito	Guard	6–2	202	RS–Senior	Wareham, Massachusetts
11	Sean Tuohy Jr.	Guard	6–0	179	RS–Sophomore	Memphis, Tennessee
13	Franz Rassman	Forward	6–9	224	Junior	Takoma Park, Maryland
15	Colton Bishop	Guard	6–3	175	Freshman	Winston-Salem, North Carolina
20	Matt Staubi	Guard	5–8	155	Freshman	Rye, New York
21	Jarred Jones	Guard	6–7	192	Junior	Havre de Grace, Maryland
22	Cam Gregory	Forward	6–8	205	Freshman	Waldorf, Maryland
23	Tyler Hubbard	Guard	6–2	180	Junior	Washington, D.C.
35	Chancellor Barnard	Guard	6–4	170	Freshman	Columbia, Maryland
42	Josh Forney	Forward	6–9	261	RS–Sophomore	Baltimore, Maryland

== Schedule ==
Date time, TV	Opponent	Result	Record	Site (attendance) city, state
Exhibition
08/23/2014*; 1:00 pm	at Université du Québec à Montréal	W 84–67	-	(N/A); Montreal, Quebec
08/23/2014*; 7:00 pm	at Brookwood Elite	W 86–73	-	(N/A); Montreal, Quebec
08/24/2014*; 7:00 pm	at Laval	W 90–74	-	Pavillon d'éducation physique et des sports (N/A); Quebec City, Quebec
08/26/2014*; 7:00 pm	at McGill	W 65–60	-	Love Competition Hall (N/A); Montreal, Quebec
08/27/2014*; 7:00 pm	at Concordia	W 72–49	-	Concordia Athletic Complex (N/A); Montreal, Quebec
11/06/2014*; 7:30 pm	Bridgewater	W 71–49	-	Reitz Arena (N/A); Baltimore, MD
Non-conference regular season
11/14/2014*; 8:00 pm, FCS	at Texas Tech	L 59–71	0–1	United Supermarkets Arena (6,234); Lubbock, TX
11/16/2014*; 4:00 pm	Cornell	W 76–71	1–1	Reitz Arena (1,046); Baltimore, MD
11/19/2014*; 8:00 pm, MASN/SNY	UMBC	W 45–38	2–1	Reitz Arena (942); Baltimore, MD
11/22/2014*; 5:00 pm, FS2	at Butler	L 39–80	2–2	Hinkle Fieldhouse (6,058); Indianapolis, IN
11/25/2014*; 5:00 pm, CSNMA	at Syracuse	L 37–70	2–3	Carrier Dome (17,691); Syracuse, NY
11/29/2014*; 7:00 pm	Siena	L 71–81	2–4	Reitz Arena (1,023); Baltimore, MD
12/02/2014*; 7:00 pm	at Columbia	W 64–62	3–4	Levien Gymnasium (613); New York City, NY
12/06/2014*; 7:00 pm, MASN	Mount St. Mary's; Catholic Clash	L 65–74	3–5	Reitz Arena (1,147); Baltimore, MD
12/09/2014*; 7:00 pm	at Saint Joseph's	L 42–68	3–6	Hagan Arena (3,743); Philadelphia, PA
12/21/2014*; 2:00 pm, ESPN3	at Stony Brook	L 52–67	3–7	Island Federal Credit Union Arena (2,552); Stony Brook, NY
12/28/2014*; 5:00 pm	vs. Fairfield; Brooklyn Hoops Winter Festival	W 61–59 ^{OT}	4–7	Barclays Center (6,032); Brooklyn, NY
Conference regular season
12/31/2014; 4:00 pm	at Navy	L 47–70	4–8 (0–1)	Alumni Hall (1,294); Annapolis, MD
01/03/2015; 2:00 pm	Army	L 53–77	4–9 (0–2)	Reitz Arena (948); Baltimore, MD
01/07/2015; 7:30 pm	American	L 53–56 ^{OT}	5–9 (1–2)	Reitz Arena (478); Baltimore, MD
01/10/2015; 2:00 pm	at Lehigh	W 65–60	6–9 (2–2)	Stabler Arena (791); Bethlehem, PA
01/14/2015; 7:00 pm	at Lafayette	L 65–69	6–10 (2–3)	Kirby Sports Center (1,123); Easton, PA
01/18/2015; 1:00 pm	Boston University	W 91–86 ^{OT}	7–10 (3–3)	Kirby Sports Center (657); Easton, PA
01/21/2015; 8:00 pm, ASN	Bucknell	L 61–75	7–11 (3–4)	Reitz Arena (924); Baltimore, MD
01/24/2015; 2:00 pm	at Colgate	L 58–59	7–12 (3–5)	Cotterell Court (1,088); Hamilton, NY
01/29/2015; 7:30 pm	Holy Cross	W 64–54	8–12 (4–5)	Reitz Arena (602); Baltimore, MD
01/31/2015; 3:00 pm	at Army	W 77–71	9–12 (5–5)	Christl Arena (2,273); West Point, NY
02/04/2015; 7:30 pm, ASN	at American	L 49–64	9–13 (5–6)	Bender Arena (1,230); Washington, D.C.
02/07/2015; 7:00 pm	Lehigh	L 63–69	9–14 (5–7)	Reitz Arena (1,449); Baltimore, MD
02/11/2015; 7:30 pm, MASN	Lafayette	W 62–43	10–14 (6–7)	Reitz Arena (574); Baltimore, MD
02/14/2015; 1:00 pm	at Boston University	L 60–73	10–15 (6–8)	Agganis Arena (469); Boston, MA
02/18/2015; 7:00 pm	at Bucknell	L 50–61	10–16 (6–9)	Sojka Pavilion (2,619); Lewisburg, PA
02/22/2015; 12:00 pm	Colgate	W 80–78 ^{3OT}	11–16 (7–9)	Reitz Arena (829); Baltimore, MD
02/25/2015; 7:00 pm	at Holy Cross	L 60–63	11–17 (7–10)	Hart Center (1,384); Worcester, MA
02/28/2015; 11:00 am	Navy	L 47–57	11–18 (7–11)	Reitz Arena (586); Baltimore, MD
Patriot League tournament
03/03/2015; 7:00 pm	at Holy Cross; First round	L 45–62	11–19	Hart Center (526); Worcester, MA
*Non-conference game. ^{#}Rankings from AP Poll. (#) Tournament seedings in parentheses. All times are in Eastern Time.
