= 2014–15 Lehigh Mountain Hawks men's basketball team =

American college basketball season

2014–15 Lehigh Mountain Hawks men's basketball
- Conference: Patriot League
- Record: 16–14 (10–8 Patriot)
- Head coach: Brett Reed (8th season)
- Assistant coaches: Antoni Wyche; Ryan Krueger; Kyle Griffin
- Home arena: Stabler Arena

2014–15 Patriot League men's basketball standings
	Conf.				Overall
Team	W		L	PCT	W		L	PCT
Bucknell	13	–	5	.722	19	–	15	.559
Colgate	12	–	6	.667	16	–	17	.485
Lehigh	10	–	8	.556	16	–	14	.533
Lafayette †	9	–	9	.500	20	–	13	.606
Boston University	9	–	9	.500	13	–	17	.433
American	8	–	10	.444	17	–	16	.515
Holy Cross	8	–	10	.444	14	–	16	.467
Navy	8	–	10	.444	13	–	19	.406
Loyola (MD)	7	–	11	.389	11	–	19	.367
Army	6	–	12	.333	15	–	15	.500
† 2015 Patriot League tournament winner

The 2014–15 Lehigh Mountain Hawks men's basketball team represented Lehigh University during the 2014–15 NCAA Division I men's basketball season. The Mountain Hawks, led by eighth year head coach Brett Reed, played their home games at Stabler Arena and were members of the Patriot League. They finished the season 16–14, 10–8 in Patriot League play to finish in third place. They lost in the quarterfinals of the Patriot League tournament to American.

== Roster ==
Number	Name	Position	Height	Weight	Year	Hometown
1	Kahron Ross	Guard	5–11	155	Freshman	Jonesboro, Arkansas
4	Devon Carter	Guard	6–4	195	Junior	Cleveland, Ohio
5	Austin Price	Guard	6–4	175	Sophomore	Farmington Hills, Michigan
10	Miles Simelton	Guard	6–0	160	Sophomore	Oswego, Illinois
11	Tyler Jenkins	Guard	6–1	175	Freshman	Fishers, Indiana
13	Cole Renninger	Guard	6–3	185	Sophomore	Lock Haven, Pennsylvania
15	Corey Schaefer	Guard	6–1	175	Senior	Johnston, Iowa
20	John Ross Glover	Guard/Forward	6–4	195	RS–Sophomore	Jackson, Tennessee
21	Stefan Cvrkalj	Guard	6–6	195	Senior	Kitchener, Ontario
23	Georgios Pilitsis	Guard	6–2	185	Sophomore	Thessaloniki, Greece
31	Jesse Chuku	Forward	6–8	225	Junior	London, England
32	Tim Kempton Jr.	Center/Forward	6–10	225	Sophomore	Scottsdale, Arizona
40	Justin Goldsborough	Forward	6–8	210	Junior	Fort Washington, Maryland
42	Brandon Alston	Guard	6–5	195	Freshman	Vienna, Virginia
44	Conroy Baltimore	Forward	6–6	210	Senior	The Bronx, New York
55	Khalid McCaskill	Guard/Forward	6–7	195	RS–Junior	Harlem, New York

== Schedule ==
Date time, TV	Opponent	Result	Record	Site (attendance) city, state
Non-conference regular season
Nov 14*; 8:00 pm, FS2	at No. 12 Villanova	L 66–77	0–1	The Pavilion (8,751); Villanova, PA
Nov 18*; 7:00 pm	Canisius	L 51–63	0–2	Stabler Arena (711); Bethlehem, PA
Nov 21*; 7:00 pm	at Rider	L 74–78	0–3	Alumni Gymnansium (1,650); Lawrenceville, NJ
Nov 23*; 2:00 pm	Columbia	L 44–54	0–4	Stabler Arena (768); Bethlehem, PA
Nov 26*; 8:00 pm, FS1	at DePaul	W 86–74	1–4	Allstate Arena (5,785); Rosemont, IL
Nov 30*; 2:00 pm	Penn State Mont Alto	W 100–74	2–4	Stabler Arena (535); Bethlehem, PA
Dec 3*; 7:00 pm	Saint Francis (PA)	W 61–59	3–4	Stabler Arena (642); Bethlehem, PA
Dec 6*; 2:00 pm	at LIU Brooklyn	W 80–76	4–4	Steinberg Wellness Center (1,058); Brooklyn, NY
Dec 18*; 2:00 pm	at Quinnipiac	L 65–80	4–5	TD Bank Sports Center (913); Hamden, CT
Dec 20*; 10:00 pm, P12N	at Arizona State	W 84–81 ^{3OT}	5–5	Wells Fargo Arena (4,615); Tempe, AZ
Dec 28*; 2:00 pm	at UMBC	W 58–55	6–5	Retriever Activities Center (521); Catonsville, MD
Patriot League regular season
Dec 31; 2:00 pm	Colgate	L 61–68	6–6 (0–1)	Stabler Arena (1,222); Bethlehem, PA
Jan 3; 12:00 pm	at Boston University	L 56–75	6–7 (0–2)	Case Gym (340); Boston, MA
Jan 7; 7:00 pm	at Army	W 71–60	7–7 (1–2)	Christl Arena (502); West Point, NY
Jan 10; 2:00 pm	Loyola (MD)	L 60–65	7–8 (1–3)	Stabler Arena (791); Bethlehem, PA
Jan 14; 7:30 pm	at American	L 59–62	7–9 (1–4)	Bender Arena (1,516); Washington, D.C.
Jan 17; 2:00 pm	Holy Cross	W 69–64	8–9 (2–4)	Stabler Arena (1,295); Bethlehem, PA
Jan 21; 7:00 pm	Navy	W 61–47	9–9 (3–4)	Stabler Arena (764); Bethlehem, PA
Jan 24; 2:00 pm	at Lafayette	W 75–71	10–9 (4–4)	Kirby Sports Center (2,106); Easton, PA
Jan 28; 7:00 pm, ASN	at Bucknell	L 62–68	10–10 (4–5)	Sojka Pavilion (2,932); Lewisburg, PA
Jan 31; 2:00 pm	Boston University	W 89–86	11–10 (5–5)	Stabler Arena (1,423); Bethlehem, PA
Feb 4; 7:00 pm	Army	W 103–74	12–10 (6–5)	Stabler Arena (988); Bethlehem, PA
Feb 7; 7:00 pm	at Loyola (MD)	W 69–63	13–10 (7–5)	Reitz Arena (1,449); Baltimore, MD
Feb 12; 7:00 pm, CBSSN	American	W 65–58	14–10 (8–5)	Stabler Arena (1,132); Bethlehem, PA
Feb 14; 3:00 pm	at Holy Cross	L 52–58	14–11 (8–6)	Hart Center (2,137); Worcester, MA
Feb 18; 7:00 pm	at Navy	W 59–53	15–11 (9–6)	Alumni Hall (1,529); Annapolis, MD
Feb 22; 12:00 pm	Lafayette	L 61–63	15–12 (9–7)	Stabler Arena (1,894); Bethlehem, PA
Feb 25; 7:00 pm	Bucknell	W 84–65	16–12 (10–7)	Stabler Arena (1,521); Bethlehem, PA
Feb 28; 2:00 pm	at Colgate	L 55–61	16–13 (10–8)	Cotterell Court (1,422); Hamilton, NY
Patriot League tournament
Mar 5; 7:00 pm	American; Quarterfinals	L 62–68	16–14	Stabler Arena (1,009); Bethlehem, PA
*Non-conference game. ^{#}Rankings from AP Poll. (#) Tournament seedings in parentheses. All times are in Eastern Time.
