= 2014–15 Lafayette Leopards men's basketball team =

American college basketball season

2014–15 Lafayette Leopards men's basketball

Patriot League Tournament champions

NCAA tournament, round of 64
- Conference: Patriot League
- Record: 20–13 (9–9 Patriot)
- Head coach: Fran O'Hanlon (20th season)
- Assistant coaches: Pat Doherty; Donovan Williams; John O'Connor
- Home arena: Kirby Sports Center

2014–15 Patriot League men's basketball standings
	Conf.				Overall
Team	W		L	PCT	W		L	PCT
Bucknell	13	–	5	.722	19	–	15	.559
Colgate	12	–	6	.667	16	–	17	.485
Lehigh	10	–	8	.556	16	–	14	.533
Lafayette †	9	–	9	.500	20	–	13	.606
Boston University	9	–	9	.500	13	–	17	.433
American	8	–	10	.444	17	–	16	.515
Holy Cross	8	–	10	.444	14	–	16	.467
Navy	8	–	10	.444	13	–	19	.406
Loyola (MD)	7	–	11	.389	11	–	19	.367
Army	6	–	12	.333	15	–	15	.500
† 2015 Patriot League tournament winner

The 2014–15 Lafayette Leopards men's basketball team represented Lafayette College during the 2014–15 NCAA Division I men's basketball season. The Leopards, led by 20th year head coach Fran O'Hanlon, played their home games at the Kirby Sports Center and were members of the Patriot League. They finished the season 20–13, 9–9 in Patriot League play to finish in a tie for fourth place. They defeated Boston University, Bucknell, and American to become champions of the Patriot League tournament. They received an automatic bid to the NCAA tournament where they lost in the second round to Villanova.

== Roster ==
Number	Name	Position	Height	Weight	Year	Hometown
4	Eric Stafford	Guard	6–5	160	Freshman	Pitman, New Jersey
5	Joey Ptasinsky	Guard	6–3	177	Senior	Highlands Ranch, Colorado
11	Nick Lindner	Guard	5–10	166	Sophomore	Doylestown, Pennsylvania
12	Seth Hinrichs	Guard	6–8	223	Senior	Clara City, Minnesota
13	Matt Klinewski	Forward	6–8	232	Freshman	Voorhees, New Jersey
14	Bryce Scott	Guard	6–3	191	Junior	El Dorado Hills, California
20	Dan Trist	Forward	6–9	234	Senior	Sydney, Australia
21	Zach Rufer	Guard	6–3	191	Junior	Bloomingburg, New York
22	Alan Flannigan	Forward	6–7	235	Senior	Dexter, Missouri
24	Michael Hoffman	Forward	6–8	192	Sophomore	Burleson, Texas
32	Monty Boykins	Guard	6–5	192	Sophomore	West Chester, Ohio
33	Jake Newman	Guard	6–7	196	Sophomore	Surrey, British Columbia
34	Ben Freeland	Forward	6–10	205	Junior	Santa Rosa, California
44	Billy Murphy	Forward	6–10	227	Junior	Greenwich, Connecticut
54	Nathaniel Musters	Center	6–10	253	Junior	Padstow, Australia

== Schedule ==
Date time, TV	Rank^{#}	Opponent^{#}	Result	Record	Site (attendance) city, state
Non-conference regular season
11/14/2014*; 7:00 pm		at Robert Morris	W 77–50	1–0	Charles L. Sewall Center (1,262); Moon Township, PA
11/16/2014*; 2:00 pm, RTPT		at West Virginia	L 56–83	1–1	WVU Coliseum (6,089); Morgantown, WV
11/19/2014*; 7:00 pm, WBPH		Princeton	W 83–66	2–1	Kirby Sports Center (1,826); Easton, PA
11/22/2014*; 7:00 pm		at Penn	W 83–77	3–1	Palestra (3,824); Philadelphia, PA
11/26/2014*; 7:00 pm		at Yale	L 60–82	3–2	John J. Lee Amphitheater (462); New Haven, CT
11/30/2014*; 2:00 pm		at Fairleigh Dickinson	W 82–61	4–2	Rothman Center (412); Teaneck, NJ
12/06/2014*; 2:00 pm		Wagner	W 97–84	5–2	Kirby Sports Center (1,744); Easton, PA
12/08/2014*; 7:00 pm		Sacred Heart	W 82–81	6–2	Kirby Sports Center (1,922); Easton, PA
12/16/2014*; 7:00 pm		Susquehanna	W 91–66	7–2	Kirby Sports Center (866); Easton, PA
12/20/2014*; 3:00 pm		at No. 10 Kansas	L 69–96	7–3	Allen Fieldhouse (16,300); Lawrence, KS
12/28/2014*; 2:00 pm, WBPH		NJIT	W 76–71	8–3	Kirby Sports Center (1,732); Easton, PA
Conference regular season
12/31/2014; 3:00 pm		at Army	W 92–78	9–3 (1–0)	Christl Arena (1,037); West Point, NY
01/03/2015; 2:00 pm, WBPH		Navy	L 65–69	9–4 (1–1)	Kirby Sports Center (1,872); Easton, PA
01/07/2015; 7:00 pm		at Bucknell	L 69–79	9–5 (1–2)	Sojka Pavilion (2,983); Lewisburg, PA
01/10/2015; 1:00 pm		at Boston University	W 63–62	10–5 (2–2)	Agganis Arena (738); Boston, MA
01/14/2015; 7:00 pm, WBPH		Loyola (MD)	W 69–65	11–5 (3–2)	Kirby Sports Center (1,123); Easton, PA
01/17/2015; 2:00 pm, WBPH		American	L 76–78	11–6 (3–3)	Kirby Sports Center (1,763); Easton, PA
01/21/2015; 7:00 pm		at Holy Cross	L 73–74	11–7 (3–4)	Hart Center (1,442); Worcester, MA
01/24/2015; 2:00 pm, WBPH		Lehigh	L 71–75	11–8 (3–5)	Kirby Sports Center (2,106); Easton, PA
01/28/2015; 7:00 pm		at Colgate	W 59–54	12–8 (4–5)	Cotterell Court (N/A); Hamilton, NY
01/31/2015; 7:00 pm		at Navy	W 74–65	13–8 (5–5)	Alumni Hall (2,887); Annapolis, MD
02/04/2015; 7:00 pm, WBPH		Bucknell	W 84–74 ^{OT}	14–8 (6–5)	Kirby Sports Center (1,812); Easton, PA
02/09/2015; 7:00 pm, CBSSN		Boston University	L 60–74	14–9 (6–6)	Kirby Sports Center (1,587); Easton, PA
02/11/2015; 7:30 pm, MASN		at Loyola (MD)	L 43–62	14–10 (6–7)	Reitz Arena (574); Baltimore, MD
02/14/2015; 2:00 pm		at American	L 77–88	14–11 (6–8)	Bender Arena (1,856); Washington, D.C.
02/18/2015; 7:00 pm, WBPH		Holy Cross	W 89–81	15–11 (7–8)	Kirby Sports Center (1,372); Easton, PA
02/22/2015; 12:00 pm, CBSSN		at Lehigh	W 63–61	16–11 (8–8)	Stabler Arena (1,894); Bethlehem, PA
02/25/2015; 7:00 pm, WBPH		Colgate	L 83–95	16–12 (8–9)	Kirby Sports Center (1,497); Easton, PA
02/28/2015; 2:00 pm, WBPH		Army	W 74–64	17–12 (9–9)	Kirby Sports Center (2,107); Easton, PA
Patriot League tournament
03/05/2015; 7:00 pm, WBPH		Boston University; Quarterfinals	W 89–64	18–12	Kirby Sports Center (1,648); Easton, PA
03/08/2015; 2:00 pm, CBSSN		at Bucknell; Semifinals	W 80–74	19–12	Sojka Pavilion (2,388); Lewisburg, PA
03/11/2015; 7:30 pm, CBSSN		American; Championship game	W 65–63	20–12	Kirby Sports Center (2,644); Easton, PA
NCAA tournament
3/19/2015*; 6:50 pm, TBS	(16 E)	vs. (1 E) No. 2 Villanova; Round of 64	L 52–93	20–13	Consol Energy Center (16,170); Pittsburgh, PA
*Non-conference game. ^{#}Rankings from AP Poll. (#) Tournament seedings in parentheses. All times are in Eastern Time. (#) during NCAA Tournament is seed with Region E=East.

== See also ==
2014–15 Lafayette Leopards women's basketball team
