= 2014–15 American Eagles men's basketball team =

American college basketball season

2014–15 American Eagles men's basketball
- Conference: Patriot League
- Record: 17–16 (8–10 Patriot)
- Head coach: Mike Brennan (2nd season)
- Assistant coaches: Scott Greenman; Nate Philippe; Matt Wolff
- Home arena: Bender Arena

2014–15 Patriot League men's basketball standings
	Conf.				Overall
Team	W		L	PCT	W		L	PCT
Bucknell	13	–	5	.722	19	–	15	.559
Colgate	12	–	6	.667	16	–	17	.485
Lehigh	10	–	8	.556	16	–	14	.533
Lafayette †	9	–	9	.500	20	–	13	.606
Boston University	9	–	9	.500	13	–	17	.433
American	8	–	10	.444	17	–	16	.515
Holy Cross	8	–	10	.444	14	–	16	.467
Navy	8	–	10	.444	13	–	19	.406
Loyola (MD)	7	–	11	.389	11	–	19	.367
Army	6	–	12	.333	15	–	15	.500
† 2015 Patriot League tournament winner

The 2014–15 American Eagles men's basketball team represented American University during the 2014–15 NCAA Division I men's basketball season. The Eagles, led by second year head coach Mike Brennan, played their home games at Bender Arena and were members of the Patriot League. They finished the season 17–16, 8–10 in Patriot League play to finish in a three way tie for sixth place. They advanced to the championship game of the Patriot League tournament where they lost to Lafayette.

== Roster ==
Number	Name	Position	Height	Weight	Year	Hometown
0	Darius Gardner	Guard	5–9	165	RS–Senior	Houston, Texas
1	Kyle Kager	Forward	6–8	195	Senior	Flower Mound, Texas
2	George Langberg	Guard	6–3	185	Freshman	Short Hills, New Jersey
3	Justice Montgomery	Guard	5–11	160	Senior	Orlando, Florida
4	Alex Paquin	Guard	6–0	198	Freshman	Montreal, Quebec
5	Marko Vasic	Forward	6–5	200	Junior	Belgrade, Serbia
12	Yilret Yiljep	Forward	6–7	235	Sophomore	Kaduna, Nigeria
13	Kevin Panzer	Forward	6–9	225	RS–Senior	Mission Viejo, California
14	Jesse Reed	Guard	6–5	185	Junior	Saltsburg, Pennsylvania
20	Charlie Jones	Guard	6–4	185	Sophomore	Manchester, Maryland
21	Jalen Rhea	Guard	6–2	205	Sophomore	New Albany, Ohio
22	John Schoof	Guard	6–5	205	Senior	Fairfax, Virginia
25	Langdon Neal	Guard	6–0	165	Sophomore	Chicago, Illinois
33	Leon Tolksdorf	Forward	6–8	225	Junior	Berlin, Germany
34	Gabe Brown	Center	7–0	230	Freshman	Stony Brook, New York
35	Jonathan Davis	Forward	6–7	220	RS–Junior	Simi Valley, California
42	Paris Maragkos	Forward	6–9	243	Junior	Marousi, Greece
44	Zach Elcano	Center	6–11	230	Junior	Centreville, Virginia

== Schedule ==
Date time, TV	Opponent	Result	Record	Site (attendance) city, state
Non-conference regular season
11/14/2014*; 7:30 pm, ESPN3	at Temple; Coaches vs. Cancer Classic	L 37–40	0–1	Liacouras Center (5,655); Philadelphia, PA
11/17/2014*; 7:30 pm, CSN	Saint Francis (PA)	W 49–46	1–1	Bender Arena (1,562); Washington, D.C.
11/21/2014*; 10:00 pm	vs. Presbyterian; Coaches vs. Cancer Classic	W 63–38	2–1	Thomas Assembly Center (2,937); Ruston, LA
11/22/2014*; 7:00 pm	at Louisiana Tech; Coaches vs. Cancer Classic	L 44–63	2–2	Thomas Assembly Center (2,868); Ruston, LA
11/23/2014*; 1:30 pm	vs. Morehead State; Coaches vs. Cancer Classic	W 51–46	3–2	Thomas Assembly Center (N/A); Ruston, LA
11/26/2014*; 2:00 pm	at Hampton	W 64–60	4–2	Hampton Convocation Center (1,000); Hampton, VA
11/29/2014*; 3:00 pm	at Columbia	L 43–52	4–3	Levien Gymnasium (1,080); New York City, NY
12/03/2014*; 7:00 pm	at Brown	W 66–49	5–3	Pizzitola Sports Center (247); Providence, RI
12/06/2014*; 2:00 pm, ESPN3	at No. 24 Illinois	L 55–70	5–4	State Farm Center (13,924); Chamapaign, IL
12/16/2014*; 7:00 pm	at La Salle	W 68–66 ^{OT}	6–4	Tom Gola Arena (1,204); Philadelphia, PA
12/20/2014*; 1:00 pm	Mount St. Mary's	W 46–45	7–4	Bender Arena (1,932); Washington, D.C.
12/23/2014*; 7:00 pm	at Stony Brook	L 47–59	7–5	Island Federal Credit Union Arena (N/A); Stony Brook, NY
Conference regular season
12/31/2014; 2:30 pm	at Bucknell	L 47–57	7–6 (0–1)	Sojka Pavilion (2,559); Lewisburg, PA
01/03/2015; 1:00 pm	Holy Cross	W 53–49	8–6 (1–1)	Bender Arena (1,138); Washington, D.C.
01/07/2015; 7:30 pm	at Loyola (MD)	L 53–56 ^{OT}	8–7 (1–2)	Reitz Arena (478); Baltimore, MD
01/10/2015; 1:00 pm, CSN	Colgate	W 71–69 ^{2OT}	9–7 (2–2)	Bender Arena (1,501); Washington, D.C.
01/14/2015; 7:30 pm	Lehigh	W 62–59	10–7 (3–2)	Bender Arena (1,516); Washington, D.C.
01/17/2015; 2:00 pm	at Lafayette	W 78–76	11–7 (4–2)	Kirby Sports Center (1,763); Easton, PA
01/21/2015; 7:00 pm	at Boston University	L 54–59	11–8 (4–3)	Agganis Arena (537); Boston, MA
01/26/2015; 7:00 pm, CBSSN	Army	L 66–68	11–9 (4–4)	Bender Arena (1,658); Washington, D.C.
01/28/2015; 7:00 pm	at Navy	L 54–64	11–10 (4–5)	Alumni Hall (1,209); Annapolis, MD
02/02/2015; 7:30 pm, CBSSN	Holy Cross	W 57–50	12–10 (5–5)	Hart Center (516); Worcester, MA
02/04/2015; 7:30 pm, ASN	Loyola (MD)	W 64–49	13–10 (6–5)	Bender Arena (1,230); Washington, D.C.
02/07/2015; 2:00 pm	at Colgate	L 43–59	13–11 (6–6)	Cotterell Court (787); Hamilton, NY
02/12/2015; 7:00 pm, CBSSN	at Lehigh	L 58–65	13–12 (6–7)	Stabler Arena (1,132); Bethlehem, PA
02/14/2015; 2:00 pm, CSN	Lafayette	W 88–77	14–12 (7–7)	Bender Arena (1,856); Washington, D.C.
02/18/2015; 7:00 pm, CBSSN	Boston University	L 53–61	14–13 (7–8)	Bender Arena (1,176); Washington, D.C.
02/22/2015; 12:00 pm	at Army	L 63–72	14–14 (7–9)	Christl Arena (973); West Point, NY
02/25/2015; 7:30 pm	Navy	W 68–49	15–14 (8–9)	Bender Arena (1,273); Washington, D.C.
02/28/2015; 12:00 pm	Bucknell	L 69–71	15–15 (8–10)	Bender Arena (2,386); Washington, D.C.
Patriot League tournament
03/05/2015; 7:00 pm	at Lehigh; Quarterfinals	W 68–62	16–15	Stabler Arena (1,009); Bethlehem, PA
03/08/2015; 4:00 pm, CBSSN	at Colgate; Semifinals	W 73–62	17–15	Cotterell Court (1,441); Hamilton, NY
03/11/2015; 7:30 pm, CBSSN	at Lafayette; Championship game	L 63–65	18–16	Kirby Sports Center (2,644); Easton, PA
*Non-conference game. ^{#}Rankings from AP poll. (#) Tournament seedings in parentheses. All times are in Eastern Time.

== See also ==
2014–15 American Eagles women's basketball team
