= 2014–15 Colgate Raiders men's basketball team =

American college basketball season

2014–15 Colgate Raiders men's basketball
- Conference: Patriot League
- Record: 16–17 (12–6 Patriot)
- Head coach: Matt Langel (4th season)
- Assistant coaches: Dave Klatsky; Michael McGarvey; Michael-Hakim Jordan
- Home arena: Cotterell Court

2014–15 Patriot League men's basketball standings
	Conf.				Overall
Team	W		L	PCT	W		L	PCT
Bucknell	13	–	5	.722	19	–	15	.559
Colgate	12	–	6	.667	16	–	17	.485
Lehigh	10	–	8	.556	16	–	14	.533
Lafayette †	9	–	9	.500	20	–	13	.606
Boston University	9	–	9	.500	13	–	17	.433
American	8	–	10	.444	17	–	16	.515
Holy Cross	8	–	10	.444	14	–	16	.467
Navy	8	–	10	.444	13	–	19	.406
Loyola (MD)	7	–	11	.389	11	–	19	.367
Army	6	–	12	.333	15	–	15	.500
† 2015 Patriot League tournament winner

The 2014–15 Colgate Raiders men's basketball team represented Colgate University during the 2014–15 NCAA Division I men's basketball season. The Raiders, led by fourth-year head coach Matt Langel, played their home games at Cotterell Court and were members of the Patriot League. They finished the season 16–17, 12–6 in Patriot League play, to finish in second place. They defeated Navy to advance to the semifinals of the Patriot League tournament where they lost to American.

== Roster ==
Number	Name	Position	Height	Weight	Year	Hometown
0	Anthony DeRiggs	Guard	5'8"	160	Senior	Brooklyn, NY
1	Austin Tillotson	Guard	6'0"	175	RS–Junior	York, PA
2	Nathan Harries	Guard	6'2"	180	Sophomore	Alpharetta, GA
3	Wyatt Hagerty	Center	6'11"	256	Sophomore	Bethel Park, PA
4	Luke Roh	Guard	6'4"	195	Senior	Scottsdale, AZ
5	Pat Moore	Guard	6'5"	200	RS–Senior	Whitesboro, NY
12	Alex Ramon	Guard	6'1"	196	Junior	Vitoria-Gasteiz, Spain
13	Andrew Bargmann	Guard	6'3"	180	Freshman	Downingtown, PA
14	Tom Rivard	Forward	6'7"	200	Sophomore	Worcester, MA
15	Jordan Swopshire	Forward	6'6"	210	Sophomore	O'Fallon, MO
21	Jack Fleming	Forward	6'6"	205	Sophomore	Tampa, FL
22	Matt McMullen	Forward	6'6"	220	Senior	Brick, NJ
25	Damon Sherman-Newsome	Guard	6'5"	205	Senior	Anchorage, AK
30	Sean O'Brien	Guard	6'2"	188	Freshman	Lafayette Hill, PA
32	Jordan Robertson	Guard	6'3"	185	Freshman	Cape Bay Court House, NJ
33	Nic Lane	Guard	6'0"	175	Senior	Seattle, WA
34	John Fenton	Center	6'9"	240	Sophomore	Modesto, CA
53	Ethan Jacobs	Center	6'11"	235	RS–Senior	Tipton, IN

== Schedule ==
Date time, TV	Opponent	Result	Record	Site (attendance) city, state
Non-conference regular season
11/15/2014*; 3:00 p.m.	at La Salle	L 52–57	0–1	Tom Gola Arena (3,400); Philadelphia, PA
11/18/2014*; 7:00 p.m.	at Cornell	L 52–58	0–2	Newman Arena (1,641); Ithaca, NY
11/22/2014*; 2:00 p.m.	at Campbell; Buckeye Classic	W 54–48	1–2	Gore Arena (1,253); Buies Creek, NC
11/24/2014*; 7:00 p.m.	at James Madison; Buckeye Classic	L 71–77	1–3	JMU Convocation Center (2,623); Harrisonburg, VA
11/26/2014*; 7:00 p.m.	Albany	L 71–75	1–4	Cotterell Court (474); Hamilton, NY
11/29/2014*; 9:00 p.m., P12N	at Arizona State	L 71–78	1–5	Wells Fargo Arena (4,143); Tempe, AZ
12/03/2014*; 7:00 p.m.	Sacred Heart; Buckeye Classic	L 70–71	1–6	Cotterell Court (541); Hamilton, NY
12/06/2014*; 4:30 p.m., BTN	at No. 14 Ohio State; Buckeye Classic	L 50–70	1–7	Value City Arena (14,054); Columbus, OH
12/09/2014*; 7:00 p.m.	Morrisville State	W 88–52	2–7	Cotterell Court (593); Hamilton, NY
12/11/2014*; 7:00 p.m.	Binghamton	W 65–44	3–7	Cotterell Court (473); Hamilton, NY
12/14/2014*; 1:00 p.m.	at New Hampshire	L 57–63	3–8	Lundholm Gym (552); Durham, NH
12/22/2014*; 7:00 p.m., ESPNU	at Syracuse	L 43–78	3–9	Carrier Dome (18,905); Syracuse, NY
12/28/2014*; 2:00 p.m.	at Columbia	L 64–69	3–10	Levien Gymnasium (1,429); New York, NY
Conference regular season
12/31/2014; 2:00 p.m.	at Lehigh	W 68–61	4–10 (1–0)	Stabler Arena (1,222); Bethlehem, PA
01/03/2015; 2:00 p.m.	Bucknell	W 68–62	5–10 (2–0)	Cotterell Court (739); Hamilton, NY
01/07/2015; 7:00 p.m.	Holy Cross	W 74–60	6–10 (3–0)	Cotterell Court (705); Hamilton, NY
01/10/2015; 1:00 p.m.	at American	L 69–71 ^{2OT}	6–11 (3–1)	Bender Arena (1,501); Washington, D.C.
01/14/2015; 7:00 p.m.	Boston University	W 62–53	7–11 (4–1)	Cotterell Court (712); Hamilton, NY
01/17/2015; 4:00 p.m.	at Navy	W 65–53	8–11 (5–1)	Alumni Hall (1,718); Annapolis, MD
01/21/2015; 7:00 p.m.	at Army	L 64–65	8–12 (5–2)	Christl Arena (640); West Point, NY
01/24/2015; 2:00 p.m.	Loyola (MD)	W 59–58	9–12 (6–2)	Cotterell Court (1,088); Hamilton, NY
01/28/2015; 7:00 p.m.	Lafayette	L 54–59	9–13 (6–3)	Cotterell Court (N/A); Hamilton, NY
01/31/2015; 7:00 p.m.	at Bucknell	W 71–69	10–13 (7–3)	Sojka Pavilion (3,741); Lewisburg, PA
02/05/2015; 7:00 p.m., CBSSN	at Holy Cross	L 60–70	10–14 (7–4)	Hart Center (1,426); Worcester, MA
02/07/2015; 2:00 p.m.	American	W 59–43	11–14 (8–4)	Bender Arena (787); Washington, D.C.
02/11/2015; 8:00 p.m., ASN	at Boston University	W 76–69	12–14 (9–4)	Agganis Arena (328); Boston, MA
02/14/2015; 2:00 p.m., TWCSC	Navy	L 69–70	12–15 (9–5)	Cotterell Court (1,062); Hamilton, NY
02/18/2015; 7:00 p.m.	Army	W 84–69	13–15 (10–5)	Cotterell Court (962); Hamilton, NY
02/21/2015; 12:00 p.m.	at Loyola (MD)	L 78–80 ^{3OT}	13–16 (10–6)	Reitz Arena (829); Baltimore, MD
02/25/2015; 7:00 p.m.	at Lafayette	W 95–83	14–16 (11–6)	Kirby Sports Center (1,497); Easton, PA
02/28/2015; 2:00 p.m.	Lehigh	W 61–55	15–16 (12–6)	Cotterell Court (1,422); Hamilton, NY
Patriot League tournament
03/05/2015; 7:00 p.m.	Navy; Quarterfinals	W 72–62	16–16	Cotterell Court (1,297); Hamilton, NY
03/08/2015; 4:00 p.m., CBSSN	American; Semifinals	L 62–72	16–17	Cotterell Court (1,441); Hamilton, NY
*Non-conference game. ^{#}Rankings from AP poll. (#) Tournament seedings in parentheses. All times are in Eastern.
