= 2014–15 Arizona State Sun Devils men's basketball team =

American college basketball season

2014–15 Arizona State Sun Devils men's basketball

NIT, Second round
- Conference: Pac-12 Conference
- Record: 18–16 (9–9 Pac-12)
- Head coach: Herb Sendek (9th season)
- Assistant coaches: Larry Greer; Stan Johnson; Barret Peery
- Home arena: Wells Fargo Arena

2014–15 Pac-12 Conference men's basketball standings
	Conf.				Overall
Team	W		L	PCT	W		L	PCT
No. 5 Arizona †	16	–	2	.889	34	–	4	.895
No. 25 Oregon	13	–	5	.722	26	–	10	.722
No. 19 Utah	13	–	5	.722	26	–	9	.743
UCLA	11	–	7	.611	22	–	14	.611
Stanford	9	–	9	.500	24	–	13	.649
Arizona State	9	–	9	.500	18	–	16	.529
Oregon State	8	–	10	.444	17	–	14	.548
California	7	–	11	.389	18	–	15	.545
Colorado	7	–	11	.389	16	–	18	.471
Washington State	7	–	11	.389	13	–	18	.419
Washington	5	–	13	.278	16	–	15	.516
USC	3	–	15	.167	12	–	20	.375
† Pac-12 Tournament winner Rankings from AP poll

The 2014–15 Arizona State Sun Devils men's basketball team represented Arizona State University during the 2014–15 NCAA Division I men's basketball season. The Sun Devils were led by ninth-year head coach Herb Sendek and played their home games at the Wells Fargo Arena in Tempe, Arizona. They were members of the Pac-12 Conference. They finished the regular season 17–14, 9–9 in Pac-12 play to finish in a tie for fifth place. The Sun Devils lost in the first round of the Pac-12 tournament to USC. ASU was invited to the National Invitation Tournament where they won at UConn in the first round, before losing in the second round at Richmond.

Following their exit from the NIT, head coach Herb Sendek was fired.

== Previous season ==
The Sun Devils finished the 2013–14 season with an overall record of 21–12, 10–8 in Pac-12 play to finish in a five-way tie for third place. In the Pac-12 tournament, the Sun Devils were defeated by Stanford in the quarterfinals. The Sun Devils received an at-large bid to the NCAA tournament as a #10 seed in the Midwest Region where they lost to Texas in the Round of 64.

== Off season ==
=== Departures ===
Name	Number	Pos.	Height	Weight	Year	Hometown	Notes
Jordan Bachynski	13	C	7’2”	248	Senior	Calgary, Alberta	Graduated.
Richie Edwards	5	F	6’7”	220	Senior	Lakeland, Florida	Graduated.
Jermaine Marshall	34	SG	6’4”	215	Senior	Goldsboro, Pennsylvania	Graduated.
Dave Whitmore	33	SF	6’6”	215	Senior	Tempe, Arizona	Graduated.
Jarrett Upchurch	22	PG	6’1”	192	Senior	Scottsdale, Arizona	Graduated.
Brandan Kearney	32	SG	6'5"	190	RS Junior	Detroit, Michigan	Elected to transfer.
Jahii Carson	1	PG	5’10”	180	RS Sophomore	Mesa, Arizona	Declared for 2014 NBA draft.
Calaen Robinson	11	SG	6'2"	190	RS Freshman	Tempe, Arizona	Elected to transfer.
Egor Koulechov	15	SF	6'5"	205	Freshman	Weston, Florida	Elected to transfer to Rice.

=== Incoming transfers ===
Name	Number	Pos.	Height	Weight	Year	Hometown	Notes
Gerry Blakes		PG	6’4”	175	Junior	Inglewood, California	Junior College transfer from San Bernardino Valley College.
Roosevelt Scott		SG	6’4”	190	Junior	Saint Paul, Minnesota	Junior College transfer from Indian Hills Community College
Savon Goodman		SF	6'6"	210	Sophomore	Philadelphia, Pennsylvania	Played for UNLV during the 2012–13 season, but left due to off–court issues. Attended Indian Hills Community College during the 2013–14 season, but did not play. Will have three years of eligibility left.
Willie Atwood		SF	6'7"	190	Junior	Memphis, Tennessee	Junior college transfer from Connors State College.

=== 2014 Recruiting Class ===
College recruiting
Name	Hometown	School	Height	Weight	Commit date
Kodi Justice; SG	Mesa, AZ	Dobson High School	6 ft 5 in (1.96 m)	180 lb (82 kg)	Sep 24, 2011
Kodi Justice; SG	Recruit ratings: Scout: Rivals: 247Sports: ESPN:				
Connor MacDougall; C	Scottsdale, AZ	Corona Del Sol High School	6 ft 9 in (2.06 m)	220 lb (100 kg)	Oct 20, 2012
Connor MacDougall; C	Recruit ratings: Scout: Rivals: 247Sports: ESPN:				
Tra Holder; PG	Los Angeles, CA	Brentwood School	6 ft 1 in (1.85 m)	170 lb (77 kg)	May 10, 2013
Tra Holder; PG	Recruit ratings: Scout: Rivals: 247Sports: ESPN:				
Overall recruit ranking:
Note: In many cases, Scout, Rivals, 247Sports, On3, and ESPN may conflict in their listings of height and weight.; In these cases, the average was taken. ESPN grades are on a 100-point scale.; Sources: "2014 Team Ranking". Rivals.

=== Notes ===
– On April 18, it was announced that senior forward Shaquielle McKissic was granted a sixth year of eligibility by the NCAA.

== Roster ==
2014–15 Arizona State Sun Devils men's basketball team
Players
Coaches

Pos.	#	Name	Height	Weight	Year	Previous school	Hometown
G	0	Tra Holder	6 ft 1 in (1.85 m)	180 lb (82 kg)	Fr	Brentwood School	Los Angeles, California
G	1	Roosevelt Scott	6 ft 3 in (1.91 m)	180 lb (82 kg)	Jr	Johnson HS/Indian Hills C.C.	Saint Paul, Minnesota
F	2	Willie Atwood	6 ft 8 in (2.03 m)	210 lb (95 kg)	Jr	Melrose HS/Connors State College	Memphis, Tennessee
G	3	Chance Murray	6 ft 2 in (1.88 m)	180 lb (82 kg)	So	Price HS	Los Angeles, California
G	4	Gerry Blakes	6 ft 4 in (1.93 m)	195 lb (88 kg)	Jr	Morningside HS/San Bernardino Valley College	Inglewood, California
F	11	Savon Goodman	6 ft 6 in (1.98 m)	215 lb (98 kg)	So	Academy of the New Church/Indian Hills C.C.	Philadelphia, Pennsylvania
F/C	21	Eric Jacobsen	6 ft 10 in (2.08 m)	255 lb (116 kg)	Jr	Hamilton HS	Chandler, Arizona
G	22	Austin Witherill (W)	6 ft 0 in (1.83 m)	160 lb (73 kg)	Fr	Highland HS	Gilbert, Arizona
F	24	Sai Tummala	6 ft 6 in (1.98 m)	218 lb (99 kg)	Jr	Brophy College Prep/Salt Lake C.C.	Phoenix, Arizona
F	31	Jonathan Gilling	6 ft 8 in (2.03 m)	220 lb (100 kg)	Sr	Hørsholm 76ers	Rungsted Kyst, Denmark
F	32	Cameron Gilbert (W)	6 ft 10 in (2.08 m)	240 lb (109 kg)	Fr	Pinnacle HS	Prescott, Arizona
G	33	Bo Barnes	6 ft 4 in (1.93 m)	190 lb (86 kg)	Sr	Westwind Prep/Hawaii	Scottsdale, Arizona
G	34	Corban Murphy (W)	6 ft 3 in (1.91 m)	190 lb (86 kg)	So	Crystal Lake Central HS	Crystal Lake, Illinois
F	40	Shaquielle McKissic	6 ft 5 in (1.96 m)	200 lb (91 kg)	Sr	Kentridge HS/Edmonds C.C.	Seattle, Washington
G	44	Kodi Justice (injured)	6 ft 5 in (1.96 m)	180 lb (82 kg)	Fr	Dobson HS	Mesa, Arizona
F/C	55	Connor MacDougall (injured)	6 ft 8 in (2.03 m)	220 lb (100 kg)	Fr	Corona del Sol HS	Scottsdale, Arizona

Head coach

- Herb Sendek (Carnegie Mellon)

Assistant coach(es)

- Larry Greer (Northeastern)
- Stan Johnson (Southern Utah)
- Barret Peery (Southern Utah)

Legend

- (C) Team captain
- (S) Suspended
- (I) Ineligible
- (W) Walk-on
- Injured
- Current redshirt

Roster
Last update: 10/23/2014

== Schedule ==
Date time, TV	Rank^{#}	Opponent^{#}	Result	Record	Site (attendance) city, state
Non-conference regular season
11/14/2014*; 8:00 pm, P12N		Chicago State; CBE Hall of Fame Classic	W 86–50	1–0	Wells Fargo Arena (5,295); Tempe, AZ
11/17/2014*; 7:00 pm, P12N		Bethune-Cookman; CBE Hall of Fame Classic	W 49–39	2–0	Wells Fargo Arena (3,842); Tempe, AZ
11/20/2014*; 7:00 pm, P12N		Loyola Marymount	W 68–44	3–0	Wells Fargo Arena (3,923); Tempe, AZ
11/24/2014*; 5:00 pm, ESPNU		vs. Maryland; CBE Hall of Fame Classic semifinals	L 73–78	3–1	Sprint Center (N/A); Kansas City, MO
11/25/2014*; 5:00 pm, ESPN3		vs. Alabama; CBE Hall of Fame Classic Consolation	L 71–76	3–2	Sprint Center (N/A); Kansas City, MO
11/29/2014*; 7:00 pm, P12N		Colgate	W 78–71	4–2	Wells Fargo Arena (4,143); Tempe, AZ
12/03/2014*; 6:00 pm, P12N		UNLV	W 77–55	5–2	Wells Fargo Arena (5,822); Tempe, AZ
12/06/2014*; 10:00 am, SECN		at Texas A&M	L 71–72	5–3	Reed Arena (6,299); College Station, TX
12/13/2014*; 12:00 pm, P12N		Pepperdine	W 81–74	6–3	Wells Fargo Arena (4,575); Tempe, AZ
12/16/2014*; 7:00 pm, FS1		at Marquette	L 71–78	6–4	BMO Harris Bradley Center (12,736); Milwaukee, WI
12/20/2014*; 7:00 pm, P12N		Lehigh	L 81–84 ^{3OT}	6–5	Wells Fargo Arena (4,615); Tempe, AZ
12/23/2014*; 1:00 pm, P12N		Detroit	W 93–54	7–5	Wells Fargo Arena (4,727); Tempe, AZ
12/28/2014*; 12:00 pm, P12N		Harvard	W 56–46	8–5	Wells Fargo Arena (6,503); Tempe, AZ
Pac-12 regular season
01/04/2015; 5:00 pm, FS1		at No. 8 Arizona; State Farm Territorial Cup Series	L 49–73	8–6 (0–1)	McKale Center (14,655); Tucson, AZ
01/08/2015; 7:00 pm, FS1		at Oregon State	L 47–55	8–7 (0–2)	Gill Coliseum (4,603); Corvallis, OR
01/10/2015; 3:00 pm, P12N		at Oregon	L 56–59	8–8 (0–3)	Matthew Knight Arena (5,637); Eugene, OR
01/15/2015; 8:00 pm, FS1		No. 8 Utah	L 59–76	8–9 (0–4)	Wells Fargo Arena (9,831); Tempe, AZ
01/17/2015; 2:30 pm, P12N		Colorado	W 78–72	9–9 (1–4)	Wells Fargo Arena (7,651); Tempe, AZ
01/22/2015; 9:00 pm, P12N		at California	W 79–44	10–9 (2–4)	Haas Pavilion (7,469); Berkeley, CA
01/24/2015; 10:00 pm, ESPNU		at Stanford	L 70–89	10–10 (2–5)	Maples Pavilion (4,009); Stanford, CA
01/28/2015; 6:00 pm, P12N		Oregon State	W 73–55	11–10 (3–5)	Wells Fargo Arena (5,436); Tempe, AZ
01/30/2015; 6:00 pm, P12N		Oregon	L 67–68 ^{OT}	11–11 (3–6)	Wells Fargo Arena (6,127); Tempe, AZ
02/07/2015; 2:30 pm, FOX		No. 6 Arizona; State Farm Territorial Cup Series	W 81–78	12–11 (4–6)	Wells Fargo Arena (10,876); Tempe, AZ
02/13/2015; 9:00 pm, P12N		at Washington State	L 71–74	12–12 (4–7)	Beasley Coliseum (3,129); Pullman, WA
02/15/2015; 3:30 pm, P12N		at Washington	W 78–68	13–12 (5–7)	Alaska Airlines Arena (6,745); Seattle, WA
02/18/2015; 7:00 pm, ESPN2		UCLA	W 68–66	14–12 (6–7)	Wells Fargo Arena (7,873); Tempe, AZ
02/22/2015; 6:30 pm, P12N		USC	W 64–59	15–12 (7–7)	Wells Fargo Arena (5,527); Tempe, AZ
02/26/2015; 8:30 pm, FS1		at No. 13 Utah	L 41–83	15–13 (7–8)	Jon M. Huntsman Center (14,185); Salt Lake City, UT
03/01/2015; 6:30 pm, ESPNU		at Colorado	L 81–87	15–14 (7–9)	Coors Events Center (9,087); Boulder, CO
03/05/2015; 9:00 pm, FS1		Stanford	W 67–62	16–14 (8–9)	Wells Fargo Arena (5,345); Tempe, AZ
03/07/2015; 12:30 pm, P12N		California	W 74–70	17–14 (9–9)	Wells Fargo Arena (5,619); Tempe, AZ
Pac-12 tournament
03/11/2015; 2:30 pm, P12N		vs. USC; First round	L 64–67	17–15	MGM Grand Garden Arena (9,024); Paradise, NV
NIT
03/18/2015*; 4:00 pm, ESPN2	(5)	at (4) UConn; First round	W 68–61	18–15	Gampel Pavilion (6,045); Storrs, CT
03/22/2015*; 4:30 pm, ESPNU	(5)	at (1) Richmond; Second round	L 70–76 ^{OT}	18–16	Robins Center (4,507); Richmond, VA
*Non-conference game. ^{#}Rankings from AP Poll, (#) during NIT is seed within region. (#) Tournament seedings in parentheses. All times are in Mountain Time.
