= 2014–15 Navy Midshipmen men's basketball team =

American college basketball season

2014–15 Navy Midshipmen men's basketball
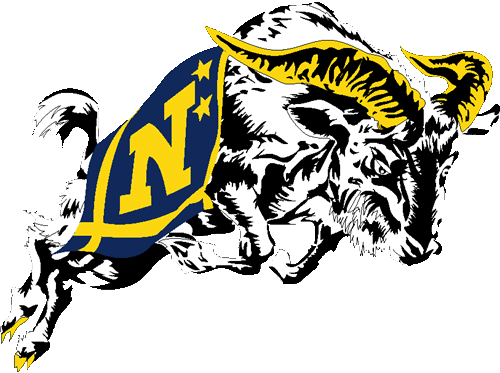
- Conference: Patriot League
- Record: 13–19 (8–10 Patriot)
- Head coach: Ed DeChellis (4th season)
- Assistant coaches: Dan Earl; Ernie Nestor; Aaron Goodman; Kendrick Saunders; Jon Perry
- Home arena: Alumni Hall

2014–15 Patriot League men's basketball standings
	Conf.				Overall
Team	W		L	PCT	W		L	PCT
Bucknell	13	–	5	.722	19	–	15	.559
Colgate	12	–	6	.667	16	–	17	.485
Lehigh	10	–	8	.556	16	–	14	.533
Lafayette †	9	–	9	.500	20	–	13	.606
Boston University	9	–	9	.500	13	–	17	.433
American	8	–	10	.444	17	–	16	.515
Holy Cross	8	–	10	.444	14	–	16	.467
Navy	8	–	10	.444	13	–	19	.406
Loyola (MD)	7	–	11	.389	11	–	19	.367
Army	6	–	12	.333	15	–	15	.500
† 2015 Patriot League tournament winner

The 2014–15 Navy Midshipmen men's basketball team represented the United States Naval Academy during the 2014–15 NCAA Division I men's basketball season. The Midshipmen, led by fourth-year head coach Ed DeChellis, played their home games at Alumni Hall and were members of the Patriot League. They finished the season 13–19, 8–10 in Patriot League play, to finish in a three-way tie for sixth place. They advanced to the quarterfinals of the Patriot League tournament where they lost to Colgate.

== Roster ==
Number	Name	Position	Height	Weight	Year	Hometown
0	Will Kelly	Forward/center	6'9"	242	Sophomore	Mount Laurel Township, NJ
1	Nourse Fox	Guard	6'0"	186	Freshman	Memphis, TN
2	Brandon Venturini	Guard	6'0"	179	Senior	Allendale, MI
3	Kendall Knorr	Guard	6'3"	197	Junior	Concord, NC
5	Kevin Alter	Guard	5'6"	148	Senior	Rumson, NJ
10	Tilman Dunbar	Guard	5'10"	163	Junior	Woodbridge, VA
11	Tim Abruzzo	Guard	6'3"	173	Sophomore	Perkasie, PA
12	Zach Fong	Guard	5'11"	161	Sophomore	Woodbridge, VA
14	Earl McLaurin	Guard	5'10"	170	Senior	Charlotte, NC
20	Shawn Anderson	Guard	6'4"	201	Freshman	New Castle, PA
21	Worth Smith	Forward	6'6"	204	Senior	Mooresville, NC
22	Grant Vermeer	Guard	6'2"	195	Sophomore	Mountain View, CA
23	Josh Goetz	Center	6'8"	242	Freshman	Valencia, PA
24	Bryce Dulin	Guard	6'4"	192	Freshman	Nixa, MO
25	Michael Brown	Guard/forward	6'4"	207	Sophomore	Horsham, PA
31	Tom Lacey	Forward	6'7"	217	Freshman	Glen Ridge, NJ
32	James Hemphill	Forward	6'6"	213	Sophomore	Raleigh, NC
33	Edward Alade	Forward/center	6'9"	228	Sophomore	Houston, TX
34	Tai Dozier	Forward	6'0"	172	Freshman	Atlanta, GA
35	Daniel Noe	Guard	6'5"	203	Freshman	Fairfax, VA
40	Nolan Linville	Center	6'8"	244	Freshman	Fraser, MI
42	Christopher Kinley	Forward	6'7"	245	Freshman	Williamsport, PA
44	Jace Hogan	Forward	6'6"	221	Freshman	Melbourne, FL

== Schedule ==
Date time, TV	Opponent	Result	Record	Site (attendance) city, state
Non-conference regular season
11/14/2014*; 9:00 p.m., CBSSN	No. 18 Michigan State; Veterans Classic	L 59–64	0–1	Alumni Hall (5,699); Annapolis, MD
11/16/2014*; 2:00 p.m., ESPN3	at Notre Dame; Hall of Fame Tip-Off	L 53–92	0–2	Edmund P. Joyce Center (7,049); South Bend, IN
11/20/2014*; 7:00 p.m., FS2	at Providence; Hall of Fame Tip-Off	L 51–88	0–3	Dunkin' Donuts Center (6,051); Providence, RI
11/22/2014*; 8:00 p.m.	vs. Northeastern; Hall of Fame Tip-Off	L 44–68	0–4	Mohegan Sun Arena (1,121); Uncasville, CT
11/23/2014*; 5:30 p.m.	vs. Binghamton; Hall of Fame Tip-Off	W 70–68	1–4	Mohegan Sun Arena (N/A); Uncasville, CT
11/26/2014*; 7:00 p.m.	Penn State Harrisburg	W 67–42	2–4	Alumni Hall (645); Annapolis, MD
11/29/2014*; 1:00 p.m.	Saint Francis (PA)	L 68–85	2–5	Alumni Hall (868); Annapolis, MD
12/03/2014*; 7:00 p.m.	Penn	L 46–57	2–6	Alumni Hall (586); Annapolis, MD
12/06/2014*; 1:00 p.m., ESPN3	at The Citadel	L 60–67	2–7	McAlister Field House (1,626); Charleston, SC
12/09/2014*; 7:00 p.m.	VMI	W 84–66	3–7	Alumni Hall (587); Annapolis, MD
12/13/2014*; 7:30 p.m.	at Maryland Eastern Shore	L 46–53	3–8	Hytche Athletic Center (457); Princess Anne, MD
12/22/2014*; 7:00 p.m.	Towson	W 61–56	4–8	Alumni Hall (1,064); Annapolis, MD
Conference regular season
12/31/2014; 4:00 p.m.	Loyola (MD)	W 70–47	5–8 (1–0)	Alumni Hall (1,294); Annapolis, MD
01/03/2015; 2:00 p.m.	at Lafayette	W 69–65	6–8 (2–0)	Kirby Sports Center (1,872); Easton, PA
01/07/2015; 8:00 p.m., ASN	Boston University	L 64–70	6–9 (2–1)	Alumni Hall (1,153); Annapolis, MD
01/10/2015; 12:00 p.m., CBSSN	at Army	W 75–66	7–9 (3–1)	Christl Arena (5,291); West Point, NY
01/14/2015; 7:00 p.m.	at Bucknell	L 63–65	7–10 (3–2)	Sojka Pavilion (2,467); Lewisburg, PA
01/17/2015; 4:00 p.m.	Colgate	L 53–65	7–11 (3–3)	Alumni Hall (1,718); Annapolis, MD
01/21/2015; 7:00 p.m.	at Lehigh	L 47–61	7–12 (3–4)	Stabler Arena (764); Bethlehem, PA
01/24/2015; 12:00 p.m.	at Holy Cross	L 65–76	7–13 (3–5)	Hart Center (783); Worcester, MA
01/28/2015; 7:00 p.m.	American	W 64–54	8–13 (4–5)	Alumni Hall (1,209); Annapolis, MD
01/31/2015; 7:00 p.m.	Lafayette	L 65–74	8–14 (4–6)	Alumni Hall (2,887); Annapolis, MD
02/04/2015; 7:00 p.m.	at Boston University	L 59–62	8–15 (4–7)	Agganis Arena (315); Boston, MA
02/07/2015; 2:00 p.m., CBSSN	Army	W 67–59	9–15 (5–7)	Alumni Hall (6,110); Annapolis, MD
02/11/2015; 7:00 p.m.	Bucknell	L 51–52	9–16 (5–8)	Alumni Hall (863); Annapolis, MD
02/14/2015; 2:00 p.m.	at Colgate	W 70–69	10–16 (6–8)	Cotterell Court (1,062); Hamilton, NY
02/18/2015; 7:00 p.m.	Lehigh	L 53–59	10–17 (6–9)	Alumni Hall (1,529); Annapolis, MD
02/22/2015; 1:00 p.m.	Holy Cross	W 84–70	11–17 (7–9)	Alumni Hall (1,647); Annapolis, MD
02/25/2015; 7:30 p.m.	at American	L 49–68	11–18 (7–10)	Bender Arena (1,273); Washington, D.C.
02/28/2015; 11:00 a.m.	at Loyola (MD)	W 57–47	12–18 (8–10)	Reitz Arena (586); Baltimore, MD
Patriot League tournament
03/03/2015; 7:00 p.m.	Army; First round	W 56–52	13–18	Alumni Hall (1,271); Annapolis, MD
03/05/2015; 7:00 p.m.	at Colgate; Quarterfinals	L 62–72	13–19	Cotterell Court (1,297); Hamilton, NY
*Non-conference game. ^{#}Rankings from AP poll. (#) Tournament seedings in parentheses. All times are in Eastern.
