= 2014–15 Bucknell Bison men's basketball team =

American college basketball season

2014–15 Bucknell Bison men's basketball

Patriot League regular season champions

NIT, First round
- Conference: Patriot League
- Record: 19–15 (13–5 Patriot)
- Head coach: Dave Paulsen (7th season)
- Assistant coaches: Dane Fischer; Aaron Kelly
- Home arena: Sojka Pavilion

2014–15 Patriot League men's basketball standings
	Conf.				Overall
Team	W		L	PCT	W		L	PCT
Bucknell	13	–	5	.722	19	–	15	.559
Colgate	12	–	6	.667	16	–	17	.485
Lehigh	10	–	8	.556	16	–	14	.533
Lafayette †	9	–	9	.500	20	–	13	.606
Boston University	9	–	9	.500	13	–	17	.433
American	8	–	10	.444	17	–	16	.515
Holy Cross	8	–	10	.444	14	–	16	.467
Navy	8	–	10	.444	13	–	19	.406
Loyola (MD)	7	–	11	.389	11	–	19	.367
Army	6	–	12	.333	15	–	15	.500
† 2015 Patriot League tournament winner

The 2014–15 Bucknell Bison men's basketball team represented Bucknell University during the 2014–15 NCAA Division I men's basketball season. The Bison, led by seventh-year head coach Dave Paulsen, played their home games at Sojka Pavilion and were members of the Patriot League. They finished the season 19–15, 13–5 in Patriot League play to win the Patriot League regular season championship. They advanced to the semifinals of the Patriot League tournament, where they lost to Lafayette. As a regular season league champion who failed to win their league tournament, they received an automatic bid to the National Invitation Tournament, where they lost in the first round to Temple.

On March 30, head coach Dave Paulson resigned to take the same position at George Mason. He finished at Bucknell with a seven-year record of 134–94.

== Roster ==
Number	Name	Position	Height	Weight	Year	Hometown
0	D.J. MacLeay	Forward	6–7	207	Sophomore	San Antonio, Texas
1	Joshea Singleton	Guard	6–3	205	Senior	Kinston, North Carolina
2	Stephen Brown	Guard	5–10	165	Freshman	Manassas, Virginia
3	Steven Kasper	Guard	6–3	192	Senior	Lakeland, Tennessee
5	John Azzinaro	Guard	5–11	169	Sophomore	San Antonio, Texas
12	J. C. Show	Guard	6–2	185	Freshman	Clarks Summit, Pennsylvania
14	Chris Hass	Guard	6–5	184	Junior	Pellston, Michigan
20	Nana Foulland	Center	6–9	220	Freshman	Reading, Pennsylvania
22	Cory Starkey	Forward	6–8	216	Senior	Petoskey, Michigan
23	Zach Thomas	Forward	6–6	185	Freshman	Ijamsville, Maryland
25	Matt Banas	Forward	6–9	205	Junior	Hershey, Pennsylvania
32	Ryan Frazier	Guard	6–0	186	Junior	Silver Spring, Maryland
44	Ben Oberfeld	Center	6–9	240	Sophomore	Eagan, Minnesota
50	Don Hoffman	Forward	6–7	214	Junior	Hawthorne, New Jersey

== Schedule ==
Date time, TV	Rank^{#}	Opponent^{#}	Result	Record	Site (attendance) city, state
Non-conference regular season
11/14/2014*; 7:00 pm		Marist	W 75–72	1–0	Sojka Pavilion (3,102); Lewisburg, PA
11/17/2014*; 8:00 pm		at No. 24 Michigan; Legends Classic	L 53–77	1–1	Crisler Center (12,181); Ann Arbor, MI
11/20/2014*; 8:00 pm, CBSSN		at No. 12 Villanova; Legends Classic	L 65–72	1–2	The Pavilion (6,500); Villanova, PA
11/22/2014*; 7:00 pm		Mount St. Mary's	L 69–73	1–3	Sojka Pavilion (3,027); Lewisburg, PA
11/24/2014*; 7:00 pm		at Toledo; Legends Classic	L 65–92	1–4	Savage Arena (4,419); Toledo, OH
11/25/2014*; 4:30 pm		vs. Maryland Eastern Shore; Legends Classic	W 58–55	2–4	Savage Arena (4,148); Toledo, OH
11/28/2014*; 4:00 pm		Penn State	L 80–88	2–5	Sojka Pavilion (4,257); Lewisburg, PA
12/01/2014*; 7:00 pm		at Fairfield	W 72–66 ^{OT}	3–5	Webster Bank Arena (1,226); Bridgeport, CT
12/06/2014*; 7:00 pm, ESPN3		at Columbia	L 39–62	3–6	Levien Gymnasium (1,606); New York CIty, NY
12/08/2014*; 7:00 pm		Albany	W 61–58	4–6	Sojka Pavilion (2,216); Lewisburg, PA
12/19/2014*; 7:00 pm		Case Western Reserve	W 88–65	5–6	Sojka Pavilion (2,105); Lewisburg, PA
12/22/2014*; 7:00 pm, ESPN3		at Wake Forest	L 53–60	5–7	LJVM Coliseum (9,739); Winston-Salem, NC
12/28/2014*; 2:00 pm		at Siena	L 71–73	5–8	Times Union Center (6,113); Albany, NY
Conference regular season
12/31/2014; 2:30 pm		American	W 57–47	6–8 (1–0)	Sojka Pavilion (2,559); Lewisburg, PA
01/03/2015; 2:00 pm		at Colgate	L 62–68	6–9 (1–1)	Cotterell Court (739); Hamilton, NY
01/07/2015; 7:00 pm		Lafayette	W 79–69	7–9 (2–1)	Sojka Pavilion (2,983); Lewisburg, PA
01/10/2015; 3:00 pm		at Holy Cross	L 62–65 ^{OT}	7–10 (2–2)	Hart Center (1,686); Worcester, MA
01/14/2015; 7:00 pm		Navy	W 65–63	8–10 (3–2)	Sojka Pavilion (2,467); Lewisburg, PA
01/17/2015; 7:00 pm		Army	W 81–75	9–10 (4–2)	Sojka Pavilion (3,298); Lewisburg, PA
01/21/2015; 8:00 pm, ASN		at Loyola (MD)	W 75–61	10–10 (5–2)	Reitz Arena (924); Baltimore, MD
01/24/2015; 2:00 pm		at Boston University	W 92–77	11–10 (6–2)	Agganis Arena (690); Boston, MA
01/28/2015; 7:00 pm		Lehigh	W 68–62	12–10 (7–2)	Sojka Pavilion (2,932); Lewisburg, PA
01/31/2015; 7:00 pm		Colgate	L 69–71	12–11 (7–3)	Sojka Pavilion (3,741); Lewisburg, PA
02/04/2015; 7:00 pm		at Lafayette	L 74–84 ^{OT}	12–12 (7–4)	Kirby Sports Center (1,812); Easton, PA
02/08/2015; 2:00 pm, CBSSN		Holy Cross	W 70–57	13–12 (8–4)	Sojka Pavilion (2,895); Lewisburg, PA
02/11/2015; 7:00 pm		at Navy	W 52–51	14–12 (9–4)	Alumni Hall (863); Annapolis, MD
02/14/2015; 4:00 pm, CBSSN		at Army	W 78–75	15–12 (10–4)	Christl Arena (1,337); West Point, NY
02/18/2015; 7:00 pm		Loyola (MD)	W 61–50	16–12 (11–4)	Sojka Pavilion (2,619); Lewisburg, PA
02/22/2015; 12:00 pm		Boston University	W 78–69	17–12 (12–4)	Sojka Pavilion (3,156); Lewisburg, PA
02/25/2015; 7:00 pm		at Lehigh	L 65–84	17–13 (12–5)	Stabler Arena (1,521); Bethlehem, PA
02/28/2015; 12:00 pm		at American	W 71–69	18–13 (13–5)	Bender Arena (2,386); Washington, D.C.
Patriot League tournament
03/05/2015; 7:00 pm		Holy Cross; Quarterfinals	W 90–83 ^{OT}	19–13	Sojka Pavilion (2,133); Lewisburg, PA
03/08/2015; 2:00 pm, CBSSN		Lafayette; Semifinals	L 74–80	19–14	Sojka Pavilion (2,388); Lewisburg, PA
NIT
03/18/2015*; 7:00 pm, ESPN3	(8)	at (1) Temple; First round	L 67–73	19–15	Liacouras Center (3,882); Philadelphia, PA
*Non-conference game. ^{#}Rankings from AP Poll. (#) Tournament seedings in parentheses. All times are in Eastern Time. (#) during NIT is seed within region.
