= 2014–15 Holy Cross Crusaders men's basketball team =

American college basketball season

2014–15 Holy Cross Crusaders men's basketball
- Conference: Patriot League
- Record: 14–16 (8–10 Patriot)
- Head coach: Milan Brown (5th season)
- Assistant coaches: Brion Dunlap; Kevin Robinson; Kevin Driscoll
- Home arena: Hart Center

2014–15 Patriot League men's basketball standings
	Conf.				Overall
Team	W		L	PCT	W		L	PCT
Bucknell	13	–	5	.722	19	–	15	.559
Colgate	12	–	6	.667	16	–	17	.485
Lehigh	10	–	8	.556	16	–	14	.533
Lafayette †	9	–	9	.500	20	–	13	.606
Boston University	9	–	9	.500	13	–	17	.433
American	8	–	10	.444	17	–	16	.515
Holy Cross	8	–	10	.444	14	–	16	.467
Navy	8	–	10	.444	13	–	19	.406
Loyola (MD)	7	–	11	.389	11	–	19	.367
Army	6	–	12	.333	15	–	15	.500
† 2015 Patriot League tournament winner

The 2014–15 Holy Cross Crusaders men's basketball team represented the College of the Holy Cross during the 2014–15 NCAA Division I men's basketball season. The Crusaders, led by fifth year head coach Milan Brown, played their home games at the Hart Center and were members of the Patriot League. They finished the season 14–16, 8–10 in Patriot League play to finish in a three way tie for sixth place. They advanced to the quarterfinals of the Patriot League tournament where they lost to Bucknell.

== Roster ==
2014–15 Holy Cross Crusaders men's basketball team
Players
Coaches

Pos.	#	Name	Height	Weight	Year	Previous school	Hometown
G	2	Anthony Thompson	5 ft 10 in (1.78 m)	150 lb (68 kg)	So	Bullis	Glenn Dale, Maryland
G	3	Justin Burrell	5 ft 9 in (1.75 m)	165 lb (75 kg)	Sr	Potomac	Dumfries, Virginia
G	4	Chris Jayne	5 ft 11 in (1.8 m)	160 lb (73 kg)	Sr	Newburyport	Newburyport, Massachusetts
G	5	Cullen Hamilton	6 ft 2 in (1.88 m)	185 lb (84 kg)	Jr	Potomac (VA)	Washington, D.C.
F	12	Christopher Morgan	6 ft 7 in (2.01 m)	215 lb (98 kg)	Jr	Gloucester	Gloucester, Virginia
F	13	Malcolm Miller	6 ft 7 in (2.01 m)	210 lb (95 kg)	Sr	Gaithersburg	Laytonsville, Maryland
G	15	De'Vaughn Reid	6 ft 0 in (1.83 m)	165 lb (75 kg)	Sr	Rice (NY)	West Orange, New Jersey
F	21	Malachi Alexander	6 ft 7 in (2.01 m)	217 lb (98 kg)	So	Eleanor Roosevelt	Bowie, Maryland
F	22	Robert Champion	6 ft 6 in (1.98 m)	203 lb (92 kg)	So	Charlotte Christian	Charlotte, North Carolina
G/F	24	Eric Green	6 ft 4 in (1.93 m)	191 lb (87 kg)	Jr	St. Mark's (MA)	Mountain House, California
F	25	Isaiah Baker	6 ft 8 in (2.03 m)	240 lb (109 kg)	Jr	Shipley	Wyncote, Pennsylvania
F	30	Riley Criswell	6 ft 8 in (2.03 m)	205 lb (93 kg)	So	Carrollton	Carrollton, Georgia
F	40	Patrick Kerrigan	6 ft 8 in (2.03 m)	215 lb (98 kg)	Sr	Warde	Fairfield, Connecticut
C	42	Matt Husek	6 ft 11 in (2.11 m)	240 lb (109 kg)	So	Bethlehem Catholic (PA)	Stewartsville, New Jersey
F	43	Taylor Abt	6 ft 8 in (2.03 m)	225 lb (102 kg)	Sr	Georgetown Prep	Darnestown, Maryland
F	44	Mitchell Hahn	6 ft 8 in (2.03 m)	205 lb (93 kg)	Fr	Fremont	Fremont, Nebraska

Head coach

- Milan Brown, 5th yr. (Howard, 1993)

Assistant coach(es)

- Brion Dunlap, 5th yr. (Old Dominion, 1998)
- Kevin Robinson, 5th yr. (Mount St. Mary's, 2000)
- Kevin Driscoll, 2nd yr. (Misericordia, 2004)

Legend

- (C) Team captain
- (S) Suspended
- (I) Ineligible
- (W) Walk-on
- Injured
- Current redshirt

Roster
Last update: October 8, 2014

== Schedule ==
Date time, TV	Opponent	Result	Record	Site (attendance) city, state
Exhibition
11/07/2014*; 7:05 pm	Assumption	W 81–53		Hart Center (1,143); Worcester, MA
Non-conference regular season
11/16/2014*; 5:30 pm, NESN	vs. No. 25 Harvard; Coaches vs. Cancer Tripleheader	W 58–57	1–0	TD Garden (N/A); Boston, MA
11/19/2014*; 7:05 pm	Brown	W 80–65	2–0	Hart Center (1,805); Worcester, MA
11/23/2014*; 4:05 pm	Nichols	W 101–70	3–0	Hart Center (N/A); Worcester, MA
11/28/2014*; 7:00 pm	at Syracuse	L 48–72	3–1	Carrier Dome (19,167); Syracuse, NY
12/03/2014*; 7:00 pm	at Albany	W 74–57	4–1	SEFCU Arena (2,667); Albany, NY
12/06/2014*; 3:30 pm	at Sacred Heart	L 68–81	4–2	William H. Pitt Center (414); Fairfield, CT
12/09/2014*; 7:05 pm	Hartford	L 61–79	4–3	Hart Center (1,127); Worcester, MA
12/12/2014*; 7:05 pm	NJIT	W 76–66	5–3	Hart Center (1,674); Worcester, MA
12/21/2014*; 2:00 pm	at Canisius	L 48–67	5–4	Koessler Athletic Center (1,032); Buffalo, NY
12/23/2014*; 7:00 pm, ESPN3	at Pittsburgh	L 39–58	5–5	Peterson Events Center (8,825); Pittsburgh, PA
Conference regular season
12/31/2014; 2:05 pm	Boston University	L 72–75 ^{OT}	5–6 (0–1)	Hart Center (1,792); Worcester, MA
01/03/2015; 1:00 pm	at American	L 49–53	5–7 (0–2)	Bender Arena (1,138); Washington, D.C.
01/07/2015; 7:00 pm	at Colgate	L 60–74	5–8 (0–3)	Cotterell Court (705); Hamilton, NY
01/10/2015; 3:05 pm	Bucknell	W 65–62 ^{OT}	6–8 (1–3)	Hart Center (1,686); Worcester, MA
01/14/2015; 8:05 pm, ASN	Army	L 70–72 ^{OT}	6–9 (1–4)	Hart Center (1,221); Worcester, MA
01/17/2015; 2:00 pm	at Lehigh	L 64–69	6–10 (1–5)	Stabler Arena (1,295); Bethlehem, PA
01/21/2015; 7:05 pm	Lafayette	W 74–73	7–10 (2–5)	Hart Center (1,442); Worcester, MA
01/24/2015; 7:05 pm	Navy	W 76–65	8–10 (3–5)	Hart Center (783); Worcester, MA
01/29/2015; 7:30 pm	at Loyola (MD)	L 54–64	8–11 (3–6)	Reitz Arena (602); Baltimore, MD
02/02/2015; 7:35 pm, CBSSN	American	L 50–57	8–12 (3–7)	Hart Center (516); Worcester, MA
02/05/2015; 7:05 pm, CBSSN	Colgate	W 70–60	9–12 (4–7)	Hart Center (1,426); Worcester, MA
02/08/2015; 2:00 pm, CBSSN	at Bucknell	L 57–70	9–13 (4–8)	Sojka Pavilion (2,895); Lewisburg, PA
02/11/2015; 7:00 pm	at Army	W 73–64	10–13 (5–8)	Christl Arena (650); West Point, NY
02/14/2015; 3:05 pm	Lehigh	W 58–52	11–13 (6–8)	Hart Center (2,137); Worcester, MA
02/18/2015; 7:00 pm	at Lafayette	L 81–89	11–14 (6–9)	Kirby Sports Center (1,372); Easton, PA
02/22/2015; 1:00 pm	at Navy	L 70–84	11–15 (6–10)	Alumni Hall (1,647); Annapolis, MD
02/25/2015; 7:05 pm	Loyola (MD)	W 63–60	12–15 (7–10)	Hart Center (1,384); Worcester, MA
02/28/2015; 12:00 pm	at Boston University	W 77–70	13–15 (8–10)	Agganis Arena (1,121); Boston, MA
Patriot League tournament
03/03/2015; 7:00 pm	Loyola (MD); First round	W 62–45	14–15	Hart Center (526); Worcester, MA
03/05/2015; 7:00 pm	at Bucknell; Quarterfinals	L 83–90 ^{OT}	14–16	Sojka Pavilion (2,133); Lewisburg, PA
*Non-conference game. ^{#}Rankings from AP Poll. (#) Tournament seedings in parentheses. All times are in Eastern Time.
