= 2014–15 Army Black Knights men's basketball team =

American college basketball season

2014–15 Army Black Knights men's basketball
- Conference: Patriot League
- Record: 15–15 (6–12 Patriot)
- Head coach: Zach Spiker (6th season)
- Assistant coaches: Jimmy Allen; Kevin App; Sean Rutigliano; Quinton Ferrell
- Home arena: Christl Arena

2014–15 Patriot League men's basketball standings
	Conf.				Overall
Team	W		L	PCT	W		L	PCT
Bucknell	13	–	5	.722	19	–	15	.559
Colgate	12	–	6	.667	16	–	17	.485
Lehigh	10	–	8	.556	16	–	14	.533
Lafayette †	9	–	9	.500	20	–	13	.606
Boston University	9	–	9	.500	13	–	17	.433
American	8	–	10	.444	17	–	16	.515
Holy Cross	8	–	10	.444	14	–	16	.467
Navy	8	–	10	.444	13	–	19	.406
Loyola (MD)	7	–	11	.389	11	–	19	.367
Army	6	–	12	.333	15	–	15	.500
† 2015 Patriot League tournament winner

The 2014–15 Army Black Knights men's basketball team represented the United States Military Academy during the 2014–15 NCAA Division I men's basketball season. The Black Knights, led by sixth year head coach Zach Spiker, played their home games at Christl Arena and were members of the Patriot League. They finished the season 15–15, 6–12 in Patriot League play to finish in last place. They lost in the first round of the Patriot League tournament to Navy.

== Roster ==
Number	Name	Position	Height	Weight	Year	Hometown
0	Maxwell Lenox	Guard	6–0	190	Senior	Fairfax, Virginia
2	Mo Williams	Guard	6–1	185	Senior	Fairfax, Virginia
3	Scott Mammel	Guard	5–11	180	Sophomore	San Antonio, Texas
4	Shane Smith	Guard	6–4	190	Sophomore	Norcross, Georgia
5	Milton Washington	Guard	6–0	180	Senior	Houston, Texas
10	Kennedy Edwards	Forward	6–6	200	Sophomore	Northridge, California
11	Dylan Cox	Guard	6–4	185	Junior	Cedar Park, Texas
12	David Hellstrom	Guard	6–4	185	Sophomore	Rockford, Illinois
20	Mac Hoffman	Forward	6–8	200	Sophomore	Pleasanton, California
21	Kyle Wilson	Guard/Forward	6–4	190	Junior	Mission Viejo, California
25	Richard Brown	Forward	6–6	210	Sophomore	Charlotte, North Carolina
30	Sean Billerman	Guard/Forward	6–4	195	Senior	Raleigh, North Carolina
31	Kevin Ferguson	Center	6–10	200	Junior	Berkeley Heights, New Jersey
32	Tanner Plomb	Forward	6–7	200	Junior	Mukwonago, Wisconsin
33	Larry Toomey	Forward	6–6	205	Junior	St. Louis, Missouri
34	Kyle Weldon	Center	6–9	195	Junior	Clarksville, Tennessee
40	Austin Williamson	Forward	6–8	240	Sophomore	Naples, Florida
41	Kieffer Jordan	Forward	6–10	240	Sophomore	Tampa, Florida
43	Travis Rollo	Forward/Center	6–7	205	Junior	Mayer, Minnesota
45	Zack Johnson	Forward	6–5	210	Sophomore	Suffolk, Virginia
55	Tanner Omlid	Forward	6–3	215	Sophomore	Monmouth, Oregon

== Schedule ==
Date time, TV	Opponent	Result	Record	Site (attendance) city, state
Non-conference regular season
11/14/2014*; 8:00 pm	Air Force; All-Military Classic semifinals	W 84–78	1–0	Christl Arena (1,597); West Point, NY
11/15/2014*; 8:00 pm	VMI; All-Military Classic	W 92–86	2–0	Christl Arena (1,060); West Point, NY
11/19/2014*; 7:00 pm	at St. Francis Brooklyn	W 74–71	3–0	Generoso Pope Athletic Complex (768); Brooklyn, NY
11/22/2014*; 7:00 pm	at Marist	W 76–62	4–0	McCann Field House (2,124); Poughkeepsie, NY
11/25/2014*; 7:30 pm	Binghamton	W 80–54	5–0	Christl Arena (835); West Point, NY
11/30/2014*; 12:00 pm, ESPNU	at No. 4 Duke	L 73–93	5–1	Cameron Indoor Stadium (9,314); Durham, NC
12/03/2014*; 7:00 pm	at Delaware	W 73–69	6–1	Bob Carpenter Center (1,707); Newark, DE
12/09/2014*; 7:00 pm	Bryant	L 73–80	6–2	Christl Arena (541); West Point, NY
12/13/2014*; 10:30 pm, P12N	at USC	W 85–77 ^{OT}	7–2	Galen Center (4,233); Los Angeles, CA
12/21/2014*; 1:00 pm	Maine	W 72–69 ^{OT}	8–2	Christl Arena (880); West Point, NY
12/28/2014*; 3:00 pm	Coast Guard	W 93–48	9–2	Christl Arena (1,000); West Point, NY
Conference regular season
12/31/2014; 3:00 pm	Lafayette	L 78–92	9–3 (0–1)	Christl Arena (1,037); West Point, NY
01/03/2015; 2:00 pm	at Loyola (MD)	W 77–53	10–3 (1–1)	Reitz Arena (948); Baltimore, MD
01/07/2015; 7:00 pm	Lehigh	L 60–71	10–4 (1–2)	Christl Arena (502); West Point, NY
01/10/2015; 12:00 pm, CBSSN	Navy	L 66–75	10–5 (1–3)	Christl Arena (5,291); West Point, NY
01/14/2015; 7:00 pm, ASN	at Holy Cross	W 72–70 ^{OT}	11–5 (2–3)	Hart Center (1,221); Worcester, MA
01/17/2015; 7:00 pm	at Bucknell	L 75–81	11–6 (2–4)	Sojka Pavilion (3,298); Lewisburg, PA
01/21/2015; 7:00 pm	Colgate	W 65–64	12–6 (3–4)	Christl Arena (640); West Point, NY
01/26/2015; 7:00 pm, CBSSN	at American	W 68–66	13–6 (4–4)	Bender Arena (1,658); Washington, D.C.
01/29/2015; 7:00 pm	Boston University	W 71–67	14–6 (5–4)	Christl Arena (701); West Point, NY
01/31/2015; 3:00 pm	Loyola (MD)	L 71–77	14–7 (5–5)	Christl Arena (2,273); West Point, NY
02/04/2015; 7:00 pm	at Lehigh	L 74–103	14–8 (5–6)	Stabler Arena (988); Bethlehem, PA
02/07/2015; 2:00 pm, CBSSN	at Navy	L 59–67	14–9 (5–7)	Alumni Hall (6,110); Annapolis, MD
02/11/2015; 7:00 pm	Holy Cross	L 64–73	14–10 (5–8)	Christl Arena (650); West Point, NY
02/15/2015; 4:00 pm, CBSSN	Bucknell	L 75–78	14–11 (5–9)	Christl Arena (1,337); West Point, NY
02/18/2015; 7:00 pm	at Colgate	L 69–84	14–12 (5–10)	Cotterell Court (962); Hamilton, NY
02/22/2015; 12:00 pm	American	W 72–63	15–12 (6–10)	Christl Arena (973); West Point, NY
02/25/2015; 7:00 pm	at Boston University	L 57–63	15–13 (6–11)	Agganis Arena (593); Boston, MA
02/28/2015; 2:00 pm	at Lafayette	L 55–61	15–14 (6–12)	Kirby Sports Center (1,422); Easton, PA
Patriot League tournament
03/03/2015; 7:00 pm	at Navy; First round	L 52–56	15–15	Alumni Hall (1,271); Annapolis, MD
*Non-conference game. ^{#}Rankings from AP Poll. (#) Tournament seedings in parentheses. All times are in Eastern Time.
