= 2015 Patriot League men's basketball tournament =

- Classification: Division I
- Season: 2014–15
- Teams: 10
- Site: Campus sites
- Champions: Lafayette (3rd title)
- Winning coach: Fran O'Hanlon (3rd title)
- MVP: Nick Lindner (Lafayette)
- Attendance: 14,357
- Television: CBS Sports Network

2014–15 Patriot League men's basketball standings
	Conf.				Overall
Team	W		L	PCT	W		L	PCT
Bucknell	13	–	5	.722	19	–	15	.559
Colgate	12	–	6	.667	16	–	17	.485
Lehigh	10	–	8	.556	16	–	14	.533
Lafayette †	9	–	9	.500	20	–	13	.606
Boston University	9	–	9	.500	13	–	17	.433
American	8	–	10	.444	17	–	16	.515
Holy Cross	8	–	10	.444	14	–	16	.467
Navy	8	–	10	.444	13	–	19	.406
Loyola (MD)	7	–	11	.389	11	–	19	.367
Army	6	–	12	.333	15	–	15	.500
† 2015 Patriot League tournament winner

The 2015 Patriot League men's basketball tournament was a tournament played March 3, 5, 8 and 11 at campus sites of the higher seed. The winner of the tournament received an automatic bid to the NCAA tournament.

== Seeds ==
Teams were seeded by conference record, with a ties broken by record between the tied teams followed by record against the regular-season champion, if necessary. If teams remain tied following these tiebreakers, RPI breaks the tie.

Seed	School	Conference	Overall	Tiebreaker #1	Tiebreaker #2
1	Bucknell	13–5	18–13		
2	Colgate	12–6	15–16		
3	Lehigh	10–8	16–13		
4	Lafayette	9–9	17–12	1–1 vs. Boston U	1–1 vs. Bucknell
5	Boston U	9–9	13–16	1–1 vs. Lafayette	0–2 vs. Bucknell
6	American	8–10	15–15	3–1 vs. Holy Cross, Navy	
7	Navy	8–10	12–18	2–2 vs. American, Holy Cross	
8	Holy Cross	8–10	13–15	1–3 vs. American, Navy	
9	Loyola (MD)	7–11	11–18		
10	Army	6–12	15–14		

== Schedule ==
Game	Time*	Matchup	Television	Attendance
First round – Tuesday, March 3
1	7:00 pm	#8 Holy Cross 62, #9 Loyola (MD) 45	Patriot League; Network	526
2	7:00 pm	#7 Navy 56, #10 Army 52	Patriot League; Network	1,271
Quarterfinals – Thursday, March 5
3	7:00 pm	#1 Bucknell 90, #8 Holy Cross 83 (OT)	Patriot League; Network	2,133
4	7:00 pm	#4 Lafayette 89, #5 Boston University 64	Patriot League; Network	1,648
5	7:00 pm	#6 American 68, #3 Lehigh 62	Patriot League; Network	1,009
6	7:00 pm	#2 Colgate 72, #7 Navy 62	Patriot League; Network	1,297
Semifinals – Sunday, March 8
7	2:00 pm	#4 Lafayette 80, #1 Bucknell 74	CBSSN	2,388
8	4:00 pm	#6 American 73, #2 Colgate 62	CBSSN	1,441
Championship – Wednesday, March 11
9	7:30 pm	#6 American 63 at #4 Lafayette 65	CBSSN	2,644
*Game times in ET. #-Rankings denote tournament seeding. All games hosted by higher-seeded team.

== Bracket ==
First round March 3 Patriot League Network
8	Holy Cross	62
9	Loyola (MD)	45
7	Navy	56
10	Army	52

Quarterfinals; March 5 Patriot League Network
1	Bucknell	90*
8	Holy Cross	83
4	Lafayette	89
5	Boston U	64
2	Colgate	72
7	Navy	62
3	Lehigh	62
6	American	68

Semifinals; March 8 CBS Sports Network
1	Bucknell	74
4	Lafayette	80
2	Colgate	62
6	American	73

Championship; March 11; CBS Sports Network
4	Lafayette	65
6	American	63

* Indicates overtime game.
