= Cameron Crazies =

Student fans of Duke Bue Devils

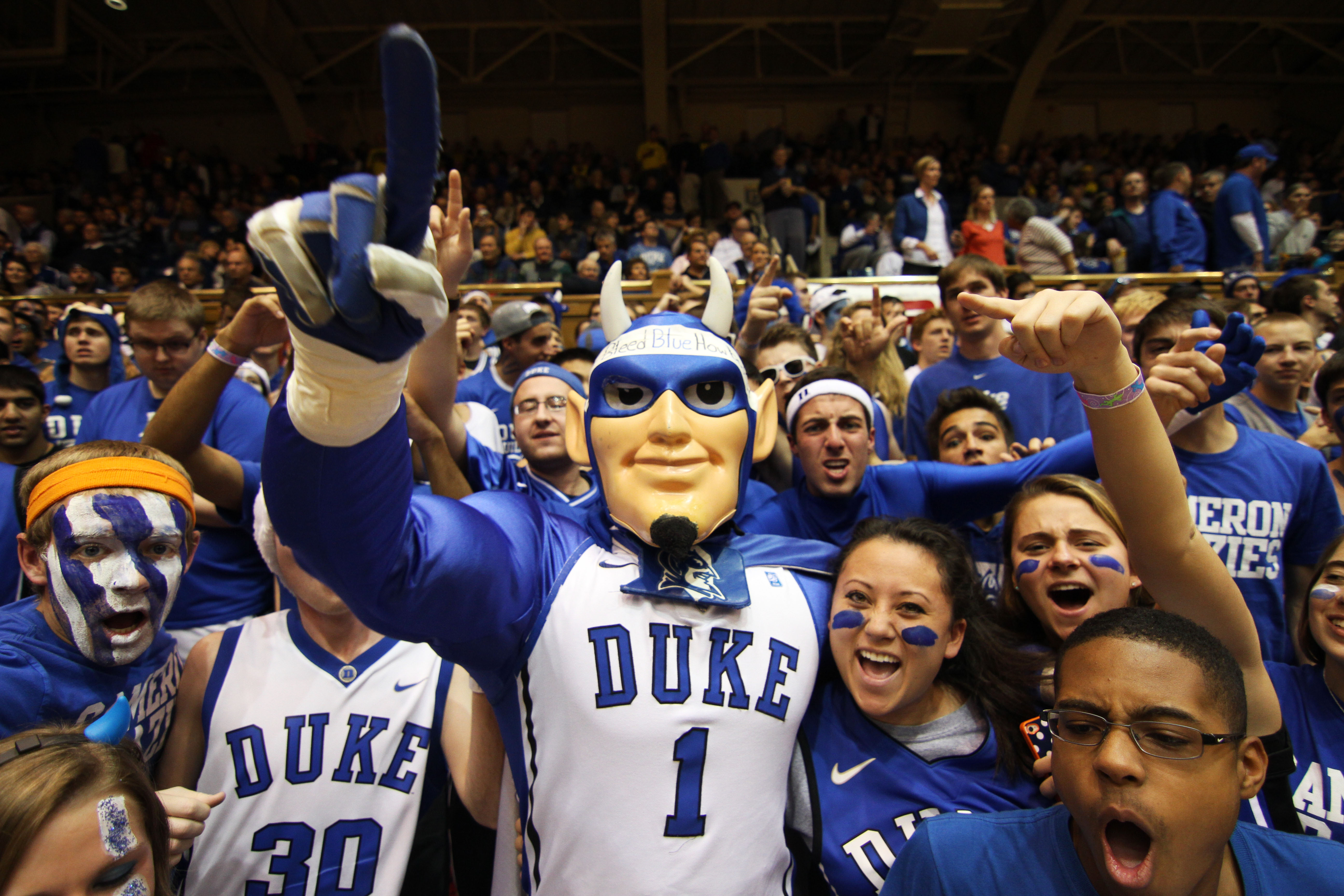
At the 2013 Duke–Michigan game

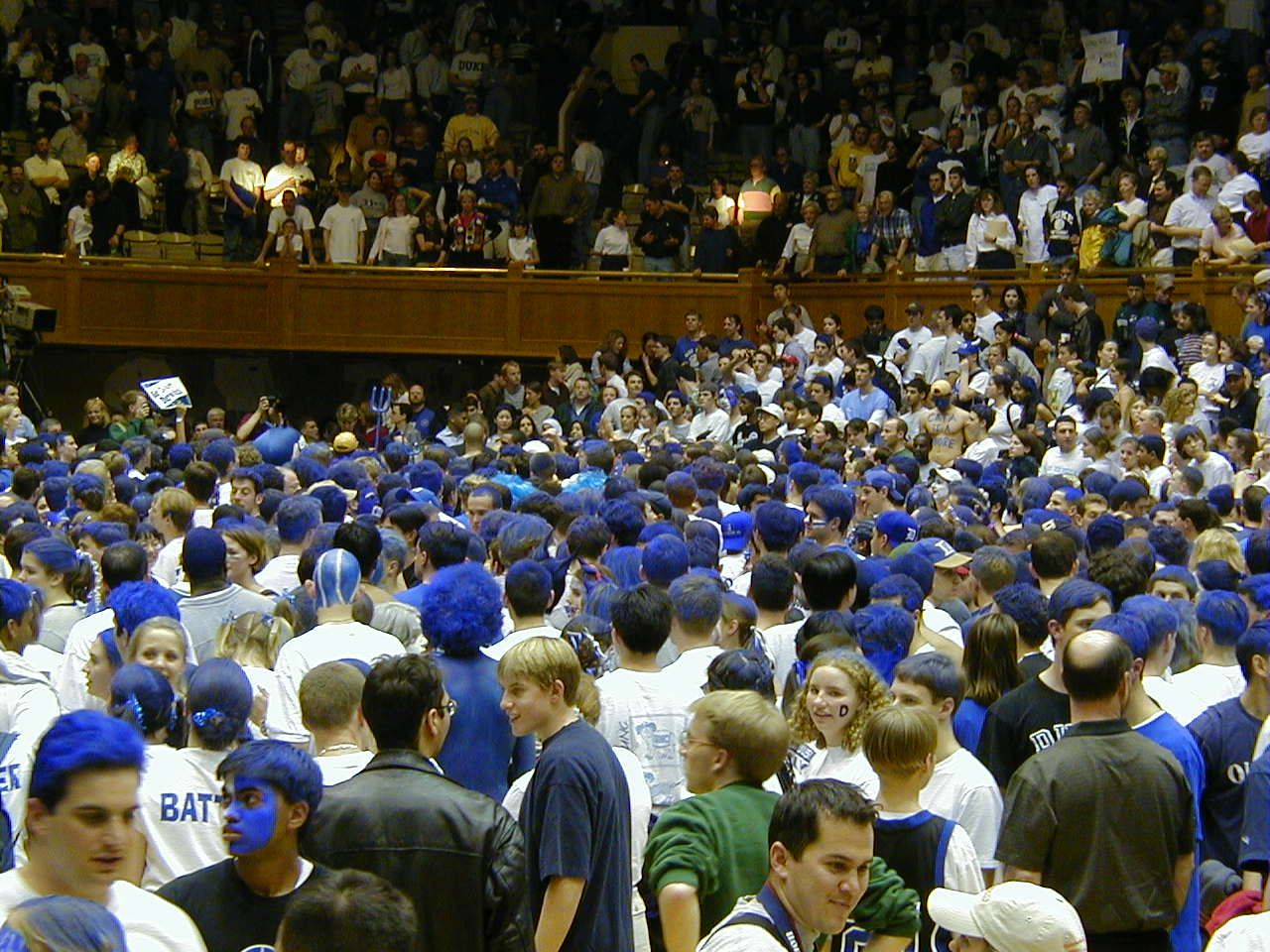
Cameron Crazies swarm the court after Duke defeated North Carolina, 1999–2000

The Cameron Crazies are the student section supporting the Duke Blue Devils men's basketball team and the Duke Blue Devils women's basketball team. The section can hold approximately 1,200 occupants. The section, also deemed "The Zoo" by Al McGuire for their humorous pranks, and "The Sixth-Man" by Duke men's basketball head coach Mike Krzyzewski, is known for being "rude, crude and lewd – as well as cleverly funny," stated Frank Vehorn of The Virginian-Pilot. The Crazies are famous for painting their bodies blue and white or wearing outrageous outfits. They start their cheering as soon as warm-ups begin. Throughout the game, the Crazies jump up and down when the opposing team has possession of the ball and yell cheers in unison at focal points of the game.

== History ==
The Cameron Crazies were named after Cameron Indoor Stadium, where the home basketball games are held, sometime in the mid-1980s. The name became widely known as Mike Krzyzewski's program became one of the best in the country. In an article about the Crazies published in 2007, Al Featherston stated, "Duke's crowd may or may not be the best student section… but it is the standard by which all others are measured." Some other colleges and universities have used the Crazies as a model for their own cheering sections at basketball games, such as Harvard University and Indiana University, both of which recently printed a run of Crimson Crazies T-shirts. Over the years, some have noted that the Crazies have calmed down due to restrictions, such as not being able to throw things onto the court.

== Krzyzewskiville ==
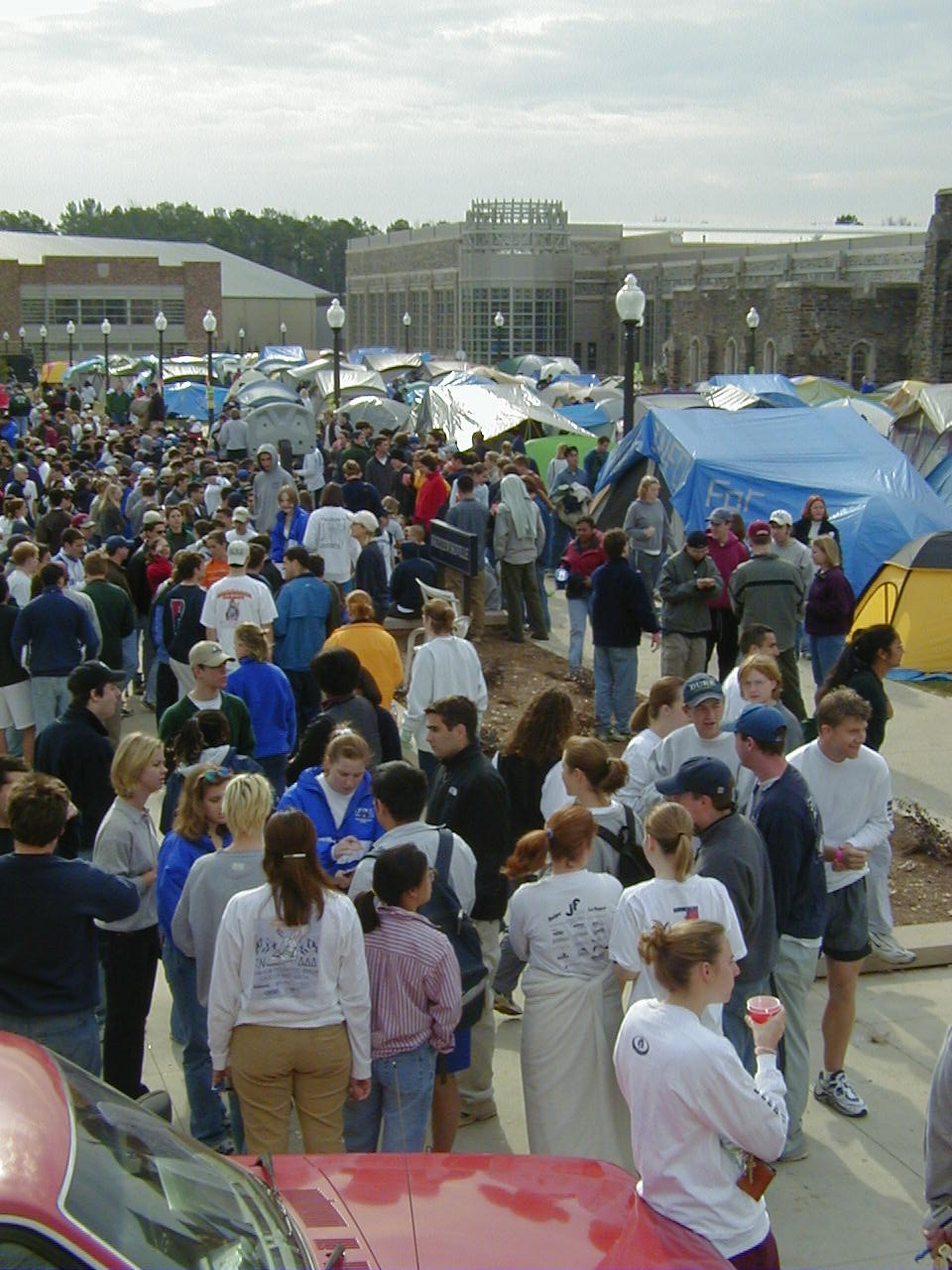
Gathering in K-ville before the 2000 UNC–Duke game

Krzyzewskiville is a makeshift city in which the Cameron Crazies camp out before games in order to get seats. It was believed to be created in 1986 when around 15 drunk students rented a tent Thursday night and camped out for a game held on the following Saturday. In the following years, students followed the trend, camping out for games further and further in advance, and eventually Krzyzewskiville became a firmly established Duke tradition. Before big games, like those against rival the University of North Carolina, more than 1,200 students pack the lawn. Living in tents in front of the stadium almost three months prior to the game, students have to use the restrooms in the gym, order pizzas and have them delivered to 'K-ville,' and follow strict rules enforced by the university.

== Strategies ==
Since the 1980s, the Cameron Crazies have harassed opposing teams. The Crazies are organized and prepare before games, handing out "dirt sheets" containing embarrassing information about opposing players, often focused around academic irresponsibility or run-ins with the law, as well as cheer ideas suggested by Duke's student team of line monitors.

Once during a game, a television network had to turn off the sound because the Crazies were chanting about one of the sponsors. Pranks included tossing bags of uncooked noodles during warmups at Georgia Tech's Craig Neal, who was 6'5" and weighed 160 pounds, throwing Twinkies at Georgia Tech's Dennis Scott because he was overweight, tossing pizza boxes as North Carolina State University's Lorenzo Charles walked on court after being caught stealing pizzas a few weeks prior to the game. Chris Washburn had records thrown at him after being charged with stealing a stereo. After being criticized by The Washington Post, the Crazies changed the normal placard that read, "If you can't go to college, go to State," and added "If you can't go to State, write for The Washington Post". Once, while losing to NC State, the Duke crowd started chanting, "That's alright, that's okay! You will work for us one day!" Cameron Crazies popularized many now-famous cheers and taunts, the most widely known of which is the "air ball" cheer in 1979 after North Carolina player Nick Yonakor's shot missed the rim and backboard entirely.

Another famous instance of the Crazies' antics occurred in a Duke/UNC matchup on February 9, 2005. It was Roy Williams' first visit to Cameron Indoor as UNC head coach after formerly leaving his head coaching position at the University of Kansas. The Cameron Crazies used this knowledge and greeted the visiting Tar Heels in creative fashion. Some Duke fans dressed up as characters from The Wizard of Oz and prepared a yellow brick road for the Tar Heels to communicate that Williams was "not in Kansas anymore".

One of their most famous chants occurs whenever an opposing player fouls out. As the player goes back to his bench, the Crazies mockingly wave at him and chant "Aaaaaah ..." When he sits down, they yell, "See ya!" Several players have been known to keep standing for long periods—as long as the remainder of the game—to keep from hearing "See ya!"

== Criticism ==
In the past, the cheers and chanting have offended some coaches and fans, including Coach Krzyzewski, who in 1994 publicly asked the students to cheer for their team, not against the opposing team. Duke University President Terry Sanford agreed, sending the students an avuncular letter back in the 1980s asking them to change the obscene cheers into cheers that were "wholesome, witty, and forceful." Television networks also took notice at one point; in 1979, NBC insisted on a time-delay so that the crowd could be censored if necessary.

However, much of this criticism has cooled since the late 1990s, especially as commentators have noted that modern Duke teams frequently face far more vulgar abuse on the road than teams that visit Cameron due to their status as one of the few private schools with a consistently successful basketball program.

== See also ==
- Krzyzewskiville
- Mike Krzyzewski
- Duke Blue Devils men's basketball
- Duke Blue Devils women's basketball
