= Duke Blue Devils men's basketball =

College men's basketball team representing Duke University

2026–27 Duke Blue Devils men's basketball team
- University: Duke University
- First season: 1905–06; 121 years ago
- Athletic director: Nina King
- Head coach: Jon Scheyer; 5th season, 124–25 (.832)
- Location: Durham, North Carolina
- Arena: Cameron Indoor Stadium (capacity: 9,314)
- NCAA division: Division I
- Conference: ACC
- Nickname: Blue Devils
- Colors: Duke blue and white
- Student section: Cameron Crazies
- All-time record: 2,370–936 (.717)
- NCAA tournament record: 129–43 (.750)

NCAA Division I tournament champions
- 1991, 1992, 2001, 2010, 2015
Other NCAA Division I tournament results
Runner-up	1964, 1978, 1986, 1990, 1994, 1999
Final Four	1963, 1964, 1966, 1978, 1986, 1988, 1989, 1990, 1991, 1992, 1994, 1999, 2001, 2004, 2010, 2015, 2022, 2025
Elite Eight	1960, 1963, 1964, 1966, 1978, 1980, 1986, 1988, 1989, 1990, 1991, 1992, 1994, 1998, 1999, 2001, 2004, 2010, 2013, 2015, 2018, 2019, 2022, 2024, 2025, 2026
Sweet Sixteen	1960, 1963, 1964, 1966, 1978, 1980, 1986, 1987, 1988, 1989, 1990, 1991, 1992, 1994, 1998, 1999, 2000, 2001, 2002, 2003, 2004, 2005, 2006, 2009, 2010, 2011, 2013, 2015, 2016, 2018, 2019, 2022, 2024, 2025, 2026
Appearances	1955, 1960, 1963, 1964, 1966, 1978, 1979, 1980, 1984, 1985, 1986, 1987, 1988, 1989, 1990, 1991, 1992, 1993, 1994, 1996, 1997, 1998, 1999, 2000, 2001, 2002, 2003, 2004, 2005, 2006, 2007, 2008, 2009, 2010, 2011, 2012, 2013, 2014, 2015, 2016, 2017, 2018, 2019, 2022, 2023, 2024, 2025, 2026

Conference tournament champions
- SoCon: 1938, 1941, 1942, 1944, 1946 ACC: 1960, 1963, 1964, 1966, 1978, 1980, 1986, 1988, 1992, 1999, 2000, 2001, 2002, 2003, 2005, 2006, 2009, 2010, 2011, 2017, 2019, 2023, 2025, 2026

Conference regular-season champions
- SoCon: 1940, 1942, 1943 ACC: 1954, 1958, 1963, 1964, 1965, 1966, 1979, 1986, 1991, 1992, 1994, 1997, 1998, 1999, 2000, 2001, 2004, 2006, 2010, 2022, 2025, 2026

Uniforms
Home	Away	Alternate

The Duke Blue Devils men's basketball team represents Duke University in NCAA Division I college basketball and competes in the Atlantic Coast Conference (ACC). The team is fourth all-time in wins of any NCAA men's basketball program, and is currently coached by Jon Scheyer.

Duke has won five national championships (tied with Indiana for fifth all-time behind UCLA, Kentucky, North Carolina and UConn), and appeared in 11 national championship games (third all-time) and 18 Final Fours (third all-time). Duke has an NCAA-best .755 NCAA tournament winning percentage. Eleven Duke players have been named the National Player of the Year, and 72 players have been selected in the NBA draft, six of which were selected first overall (most all-time). Additionally, Duke has had 36 players named All-Americans (60 total selections) and 14 players named Academic All-Americans. Duke has been the Atlantic Coast Conference Champions a record 24 times, and also lays claim to 22 ACC regular season titles. Prior to joining the ACC, Duke won the Southern Conference championships five times. Duke has also finished the season ranked No. 1 in the AP poll eight times and is the all-time leader in total weeks ranked as the number one team in the nation by the AP with 145 weeks. Additionally, the Blue Devils have the third longest streak in the AP Top 25 in history with 200 consecutive appearances from 1996 to 2007, trailing only Kansas' 231 consecutive polls from 2009 to 2021, and UCLA's 221 consecutive polls from 1966 to 1980.

== Team history ==
=== Early years (1906–1953) ===
In 1906, Wilbur Wade Card, Trinity College's Athletic Director and a member of the Class of 1900, introduced the game of basketball to Trinity. The January 30 issue of The Trinity Chronicle headlined the new sport on its front page. Trinity's first game ended in a loss to Wake Forest, 24–10. The game was played in the Angier B. Duke Gymnasium, later known as The Ark. The Trinity team won its first title in 1920, the state championship, by beating the North Carolina State College of Agriculture and Engineering (now NC State) 25 to 24. Earlier in the season they had beaten the University of North Carolina 19–18 in the first match-up between the two schools. Trinity college then became Duke University.

Billy Werber, Class of 1930, became Duke's first All-American in basketball. The Gothic-style West Campus opened that year, with a new gym, later to be named for Coach Card. The Indoor Stadium opened in 1940. Initially it was referred to as an "Addition" to the gymnasium. Part of its cost was paid for with the proceeds from the Duke football team's appearance in the 1938 Rose Bowl. In 1972 it would be named for Eddie Cameron, head coach from 1929 to 1942.

In 1952, Dick Groat became the first Duke player to be named National Player of the Year. Duke left the Southern Conference to become a charter member of the Atlantic Coast Conference in 1953. The Duke team under Vic Bubas made its first appearance in the Final Four in 1963, losing 94–75 to Loyola Chicago in the semifinal. The next year, Bubas' team reached the national title game, losing to the Bruins of UCLA, which claimed the first of that program's 10 titles in the next 12 years. Bob Verga was Duke's star player in 1967.

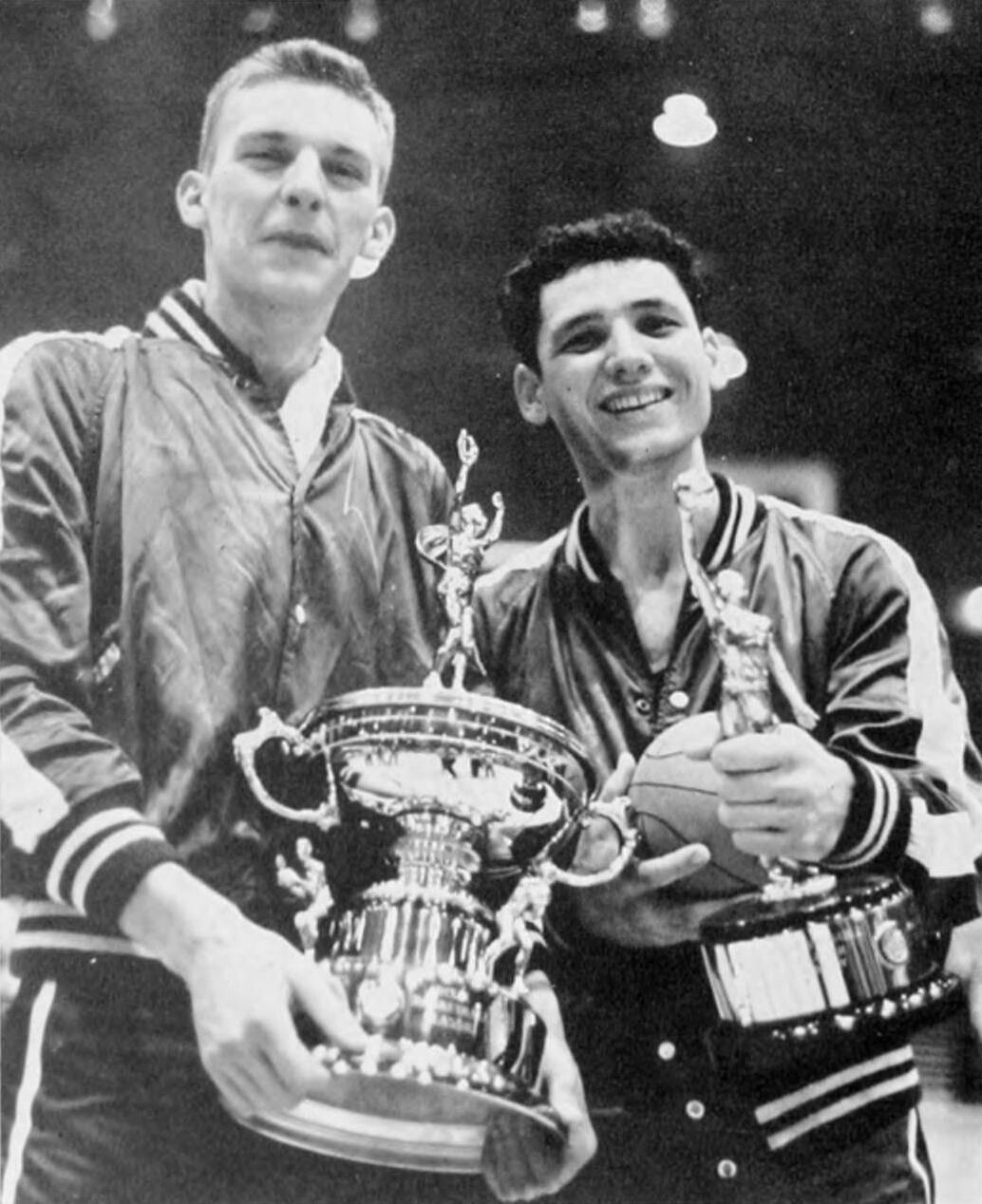
Co-captains Bernie Janicki and Rudy D'Emilio hold Duke's 1953 Dixie Classic trophy.

=== Bill Foster (1974–1980) ===
The basketball program won its 1000th game in 1974, making Duke only the eighth school in NCAA history to reach that figure. In a turnaround, Coach Bill Foster's 1978 Blue Devils, who had gone 2–10 in the ACC the previous year, won the conference tournament and went on to the NCAA championship game, where they fell to Kentucky. Gene Banks, Mike Gminski ('80) and Jim Spanarkel ('79) ran the floor.

=== Mike Krzyzewski (1980–2022) ===
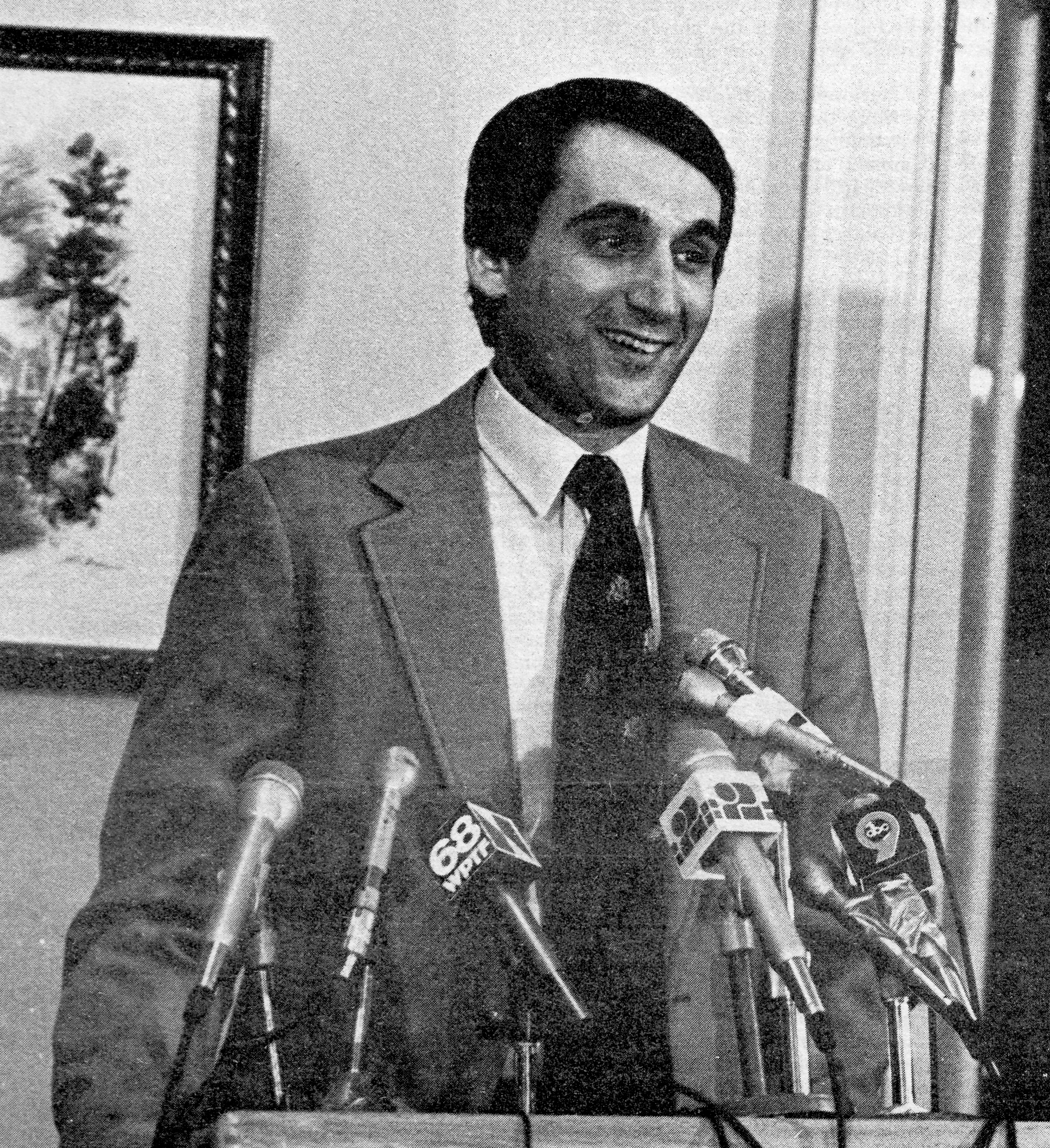
Krzyzewski being named Duke's head coach on March 18, 1980

Mike Krzyzewski was at Duke from 1980 to 2022.

- 5 National Championships – 2nd most all time, the last being in 2015
- 13 Final Fours as well as five in a row from 1988 to 1992
- 17 Elite Eights
- 26 Sweet Sixteens and nine straight from 1998–2006
- 36 NCAA tournament berths
- 101 NCAA tournament wins (most ever)
- 14 No. 1 seeds
- 28 conference titles (13 regular season, 15 tournament), 10 of the 13 ACC Tournament Titles from 1998–99 through 2010–11
- 15 30-win seasons
- 36 20-win seasons
- Number 1 AP ranking in 17 of the past 28 seasons
- 8 Naismith College Player of the Year Awards
- 9 National Defensive Players of the Year Awards
- 26 AP All-Americans
- 14 consensus first team All-Americans
- 11 NBA top-10 picks: T-1st
- 23 NBA Draft first round picks
- 1,202 career wins

Krzyzewski's teams made the Final Four in 1986, 1988, 1989, 1990, 1991, 1992, 1994, 1999, 2001, 2004, 2010, 2015 and 2022.

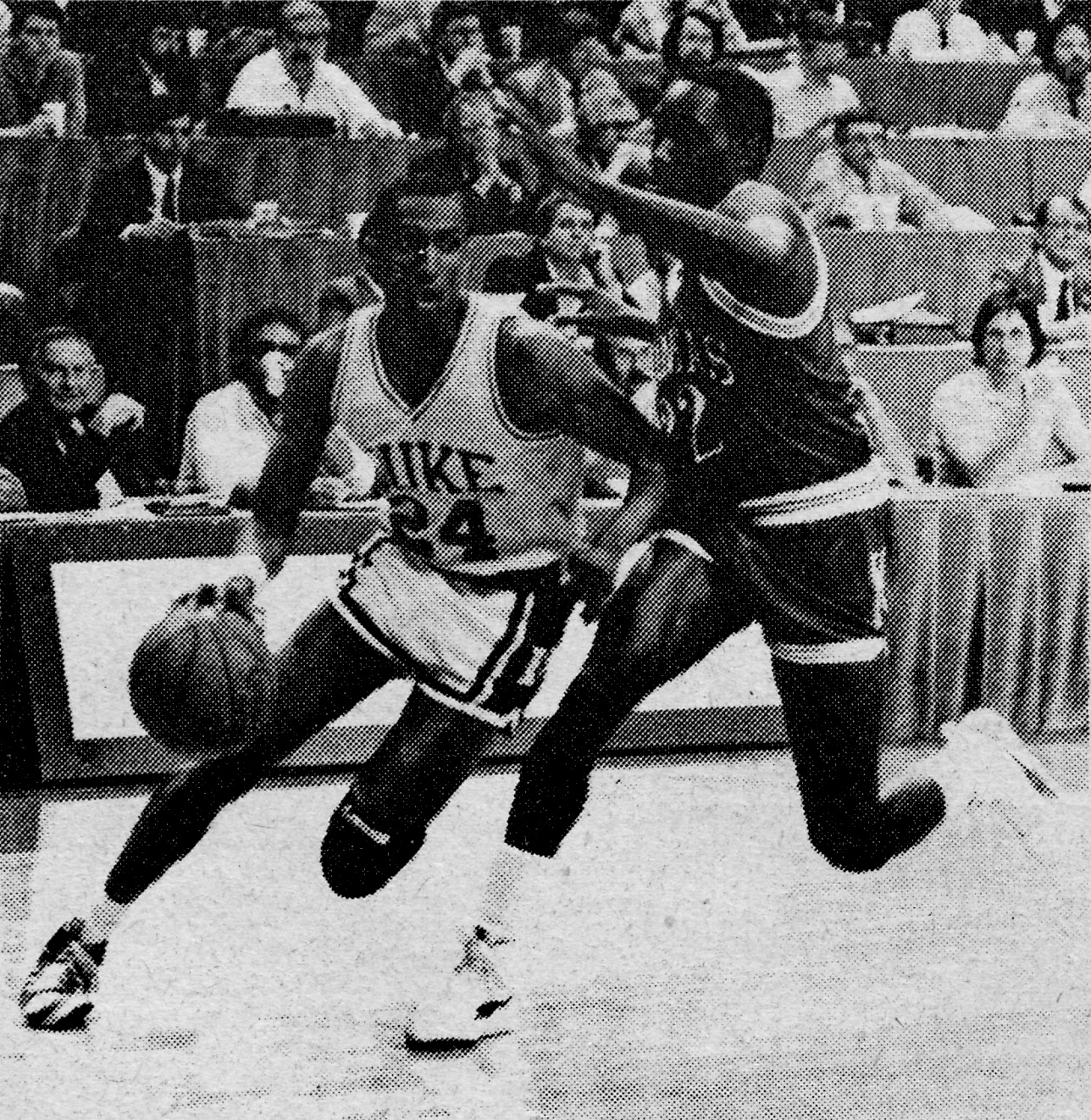
Johnny Dawkins in the 1986 Final Four

In Krzyzewski's first season, the Blue Devils finished the season with a 17–13 overall record and 6–8 record in ACC play. The team later played in the NIT tournament, advancing to the quarterfinals. Despite having a good record the previous season, the Blue Devils struggled during the next two seasons, finishing with 10 wins in 1982 and 11 wins in 1983. The 1984 team, led by Tommy Amaker and Johnny Dawkins, bounced back in strong fashion finishing 24–10 and was ranked the No.14 in the AP and Coaches poll, but lost in the second round of the NCAA tournament to the Washington Huskies (having earned a first-round bye). In 1985 Duke defeated Pepperdine in the first round of the NCAA tournament, for Krzyzewski's first tournament win, but lost to Boston College in the second round 74–73. The next season the Blue Devils made their first Final Four under Krzyzewski. They beat Kansas to advance to the title game against Louisville, where they ultimately lost 72–69.

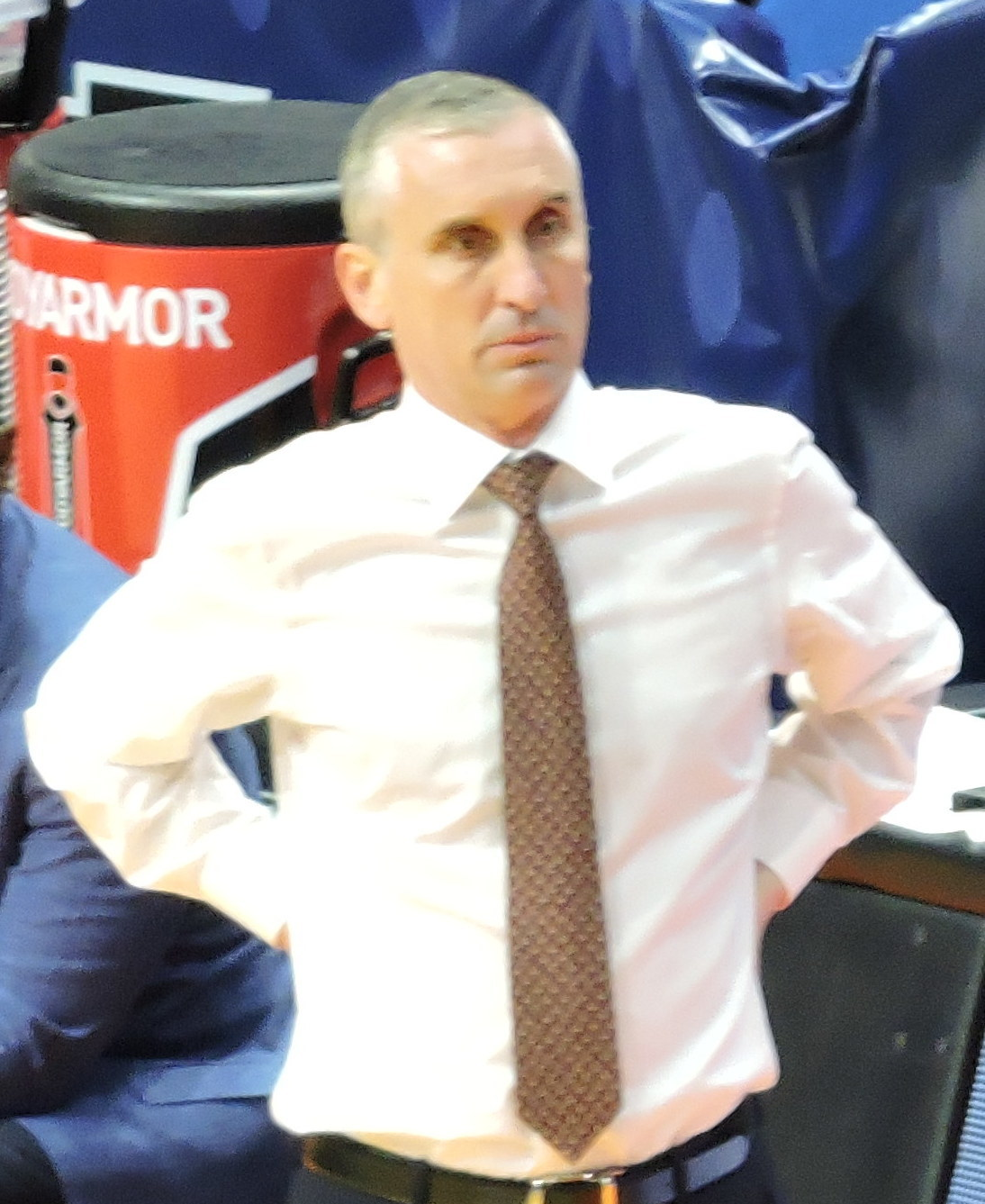
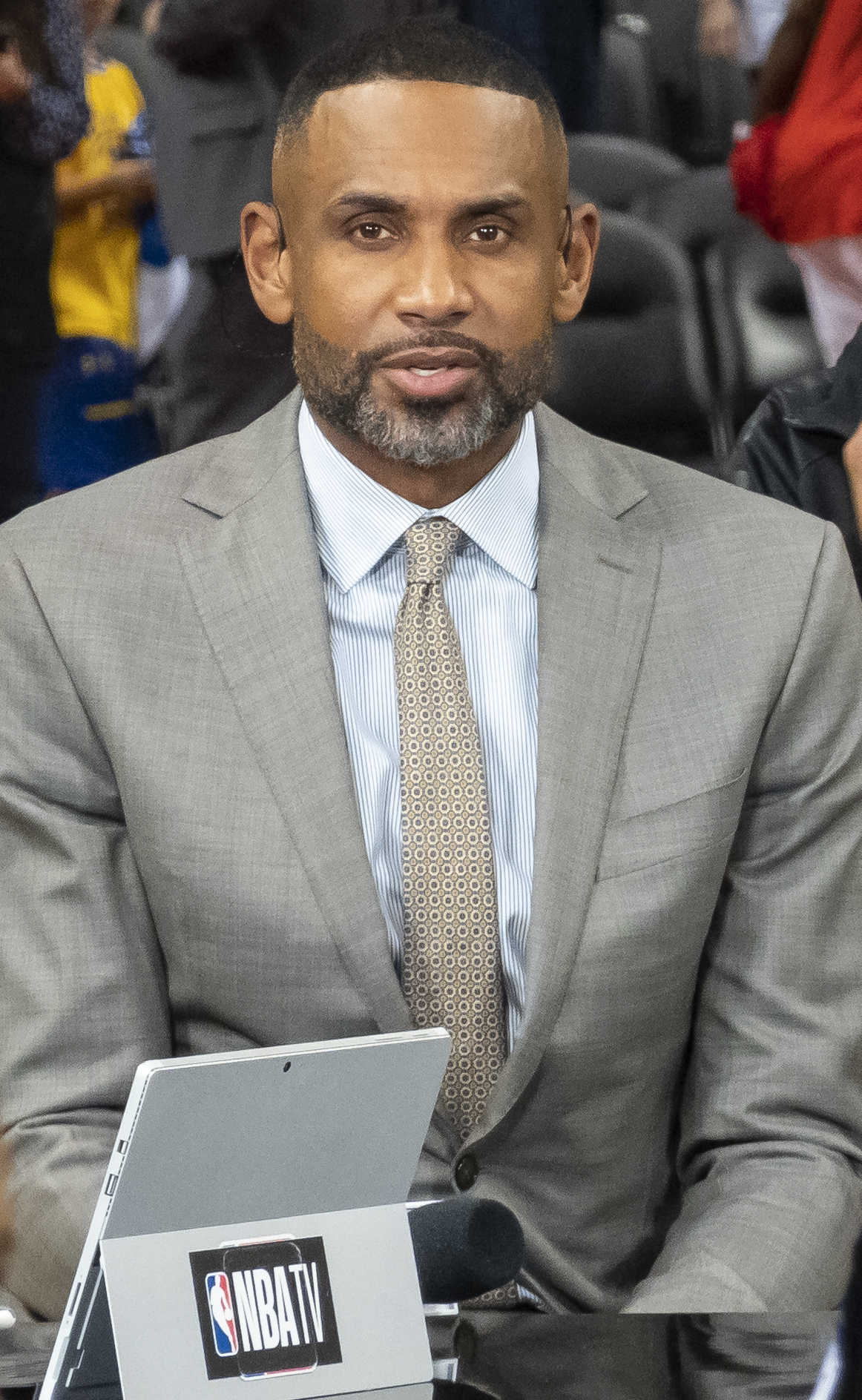
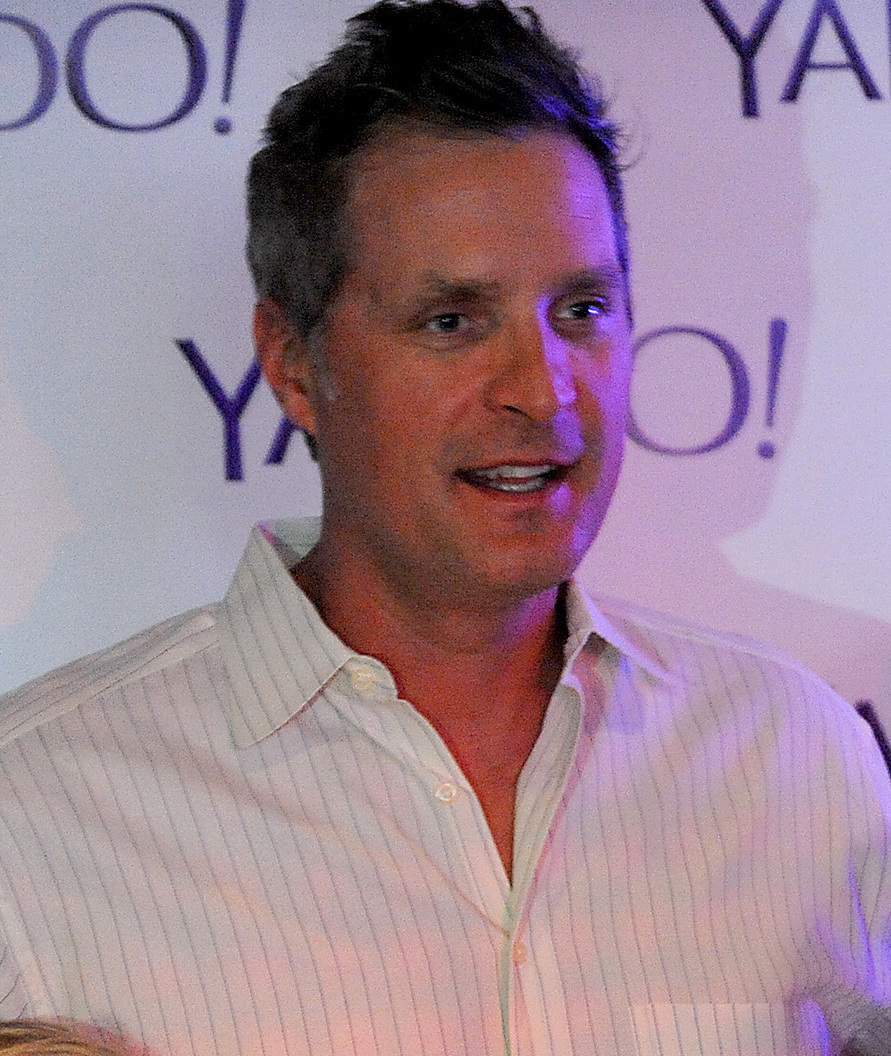
The trio of Bobby Hurley, Grant Hill, and Christian Laettner led Duke to back-to-back National championships in 1991 and 1992.

Duke upset the heavily favored UNLV Runnin' Rebels 79–77 in the Final Four in 1991, a rematch of the 1990 final in which Duke lost by 30 points. The team, led by Christian Laettner, Bobby Hurley, Grant Hill, and Thomas Hill, went on to defeat Kansas 72–65 to win the university's first NCAA Championship. Ranked #1 all season and favored to repeat as national champions in 1992, Duke took part in a game "acclaimed by many [as] the greatest college basketball game ever played," according to ESPN. In the Elite Eight, Duke met the Rick Pitino-led Kentucky Wildcats. It appeared Kentucky had sealed the win in overtime when guard Sean Woods hit a running shot off the glass in the lane to put Kentucky up by one with 2.1 seconds left on the clock. After a timeout, Duke's Grant Hill threw a full-court pass to Christian Laettner. Laettner took one dribble and nailed a turn-around jumper at the buzzer to send Duke into the Final Four with a 104–103 victory (The Shot). Duke went on to defeat sixth-seeded Michigan, led by the Fab Five as freshmen starters including Chris Webber, Jalen Rose and Juwan Howard, 71–51 to repeat as national champions. Following the successful repeat, Laettner was the only collegiate player to be chosen for the Dream Team that won Olympic gold in Barcelona, while Krzyzewski was an assistant coach under Chuck Daly of the Detroit Pistons in a precursor to his becoming Team USA coach in 2006 and coaching them to two gold medals.

They later met Kentucky for another classic regional final game, but blow a 17-point second half lead in losing to the Wildcats. The Blue Devils lost the 1994 title game to Arkansas and their "Forty Minutes of Hell" defense. The next two seasons saw them fall to just 31–31, though they made the 1996 tournament with an 18–12 record, 8–8 in conference play. They also fell in the 1999 title game, this time to Jim Calhoun and the UConn Huskies. Duke defeated Arizona 82–72 to win its third NCAA Championship in 2001, becoming one of a handful of teams in NCAA Tournament history to defeat all of their tournament opponents by double digits. Krzyzewski was inducted into the Basketball Hall of Fame later that year. On April 5, 2010, Duke Men's Basketball won their fourth NCAA Championship by defeating Butler 61–59. On April 6, 2015, Duke's Men's Basketball won their fifth NCAA Championship by defeating Wisconsin 68–63.

Coach K announced that the 2021–22 season would be his last one coaching for Duke. Making it to the Final Four one last time, Duke fell just short of the championship game, losing to the North Carolina Tar Heels 81–77 in the first ever meeting between the rivals in the NCAA Tournament.

=== Jon Scheyer (2022–present) ===
On June 2, 2021, Scheyer was named as the next head coach at Duke following Krzyzewski's retirement at the end of the 2021-22 season. On March 11, 2023, he became the first person to win an ACC tournament title as both a coach and a player.

Former Duke stars such as Jim Spanarkel, Gene Banks, Alaa Abdelnaby, Johnny Dawkins, Cherokee Parks, Bobby Hurley, Antonio Lang, Roshown McLeod, William Avery, Trajan Langdon, Grant Hill, Danny Ferry, Christian Laettner, Kenny Dennard, Brian Davis, Elton Brand, Shane Battier, Carlos Boozer, Chris Duhon, Mike Dunleavy Jr., Dahntay Jones, Daniel Ewing, JJ Redick, Shavlik Randolph, Shelden Williams, Corey Maggette, Luol Deng, Josh McRoberts, Gerald Henderson, Andre Dawkins, Austin Rivers, Lance Thomas, Kyle Singler, Miles Plumlee, Mason Plumlee, Marshall Plumlee, Bob Verga, Quinn Cook, Nolan Smith, Jason Williams, Jabari Parker, Rodney Hood, Seth Curry, Kyrie Irving, Matt Jones, Amile Jefferson, Jahlil Okafor, Tyus Jones, Justise Winslow, Grayson Allen, Brandon Ingram, Luke Kennard, Jayson Tatum, Harry Giles, Frank Jackson, Gary Trent Jr., Trevon Duval, Marvin Bagley III, Wendell Carter Jr., RJ Barrett, Marques Bolden, Cam Reddish, Zion Williamson, Tre Jones, Vernon Carey Jr., Cassius Stanley, Jalen Johnson, Paolo Banchero, Mark Williams, Wendell Moore Jr., Trevor Keels, AJ Griffin and Dereck Lively II have gone on to play in the NBA.

Many of Krzyzewski's assistants and former players, such as Tommy Amaker (Seton Hall, University of Michigan and Harvard), Bob Bender (Illinois State University and University of Washington), Chuck Swenson at William & Mary, Mike Brey (Delaware and Notre Dame), Jeff Capel (VCU, Oklahoma and Pittsburgh), Chris Collins (Northwestern), Johnny Dawkins (Stanford, UCF), Quin Snyder (Missouri, Utah Jazz, Atlanta Hawks), Steve Wojciechowski (Marquette), and JJ Redick (Los Angeles Lakers) have become head basketball coaches at major universities and the NBA, while Pete Gaudet is now the head coach of the India women's national basketball team.

=== Team captains ===
- Danny Ferry
- Christian Laettner
- Bobby Hurley
- Grant Hill
- Greg Newton
- Shane Battier
- Carlos Boozer
- Mike Dunleavy Jr
- JJ Redick
- Shelden Williams
- Rodney Hood
- Josh Hairston
- Tyler Thornton
- Quinn Cook
- Amile Jefferson
- Grayson Allen
- Matt Jones
- Javin DeLaurier
- Jack White
- Tre Jones
- Joey Baker
- Wendell Moore Jr.
- Jeremy Roach
- Tyrese Proctor

=== Results by season (1980–2026) ===
Record table
Season	Coach	Overall	Conference	Standing	Postseason
Mike Krzyzewski (Atlantic Coast Conference) (1980–2022)
1980–81	Mike Krzyzewski	17–13	6–8	T-5th	NIT Quarterfinals
1981–82	Mike Krzyzewski	10–17	4–10	T-6th	—
1982–83	Mike Krzyzewski	11–17	3–11	7th	—
1983–84	Mike Krzyzewski	24–10	7–7	T-3rd	NCAA Round of 32
1984–85	Mike Krzyzewski	23–8	8–6	T-4th	NCAA Round of 32
1985–86	Mike Krzyzewski	37–3	12–2	1st	NCAA Runner-Up
1986–87	Mike Krzyzewski	24–9	9–5	3rd	NCAA Sweet Sixteen
1987–88	Mike Krzyzewski	28–7	9–5	3rd	NCAA Final Four
1988–89	Mike Krzyzewski	28–8	9–5	T-2nd	NCAA Final Four
1989–90	Mike Krzyzewski	29–9	9–5	T-2nd	NCAA Runner-Up
1990–91	Mike Krzyzewski	32–7	11–3	1st	National champions
1991–92	Mike Krzyzewski	34–2	14–2	1st	National champions
1992–93	Mike Krzyzewski	24–8	10–6	T-3rd	NCAA Round of 32
1993–94	Mike Krzyzewski	28–6	12–4	1st	NCAA Runner-Up
1994–95	Mike Krzyzewski; Pete Gaudet	Mike K. 9–3; Pete G. 4–15	2–14	9th	—
1995–96	Mike Krzyzewski	18–13	8–8	T-4th	NCAA Round of 64
1996–97	Mike Krzyzewski	24–9	12–4	1st	NCAA Round of 32
1997–98	Mike Krzyzewski	32–4	15–1	1st	NCAA Elite Eight
1998–99	Mike Krzyzewski	37–2	16–0	1st	NCAA Runner-Up
1999–2000	Mike Krzyzewski	29–5	15–1	1st	NCAA Sweet Sixteen
2000–01	Mike Krzyzewski	35–4	13–3	T-1st	National champions
2001–02	Mike Krzyzewski	31–4	13–3	2nd	NCAA Sweet Sixteen
2002–03	Mike Krzyzewski	26–7	11–5	T-3rd	NCAA Sweet Sixteen
2003–04	Mike Krzyzewski	31-6	13-3	1st	NCAA Final Four
2004–05	Mike Krzyzewski	27–6	11–5	3rd	NCAA Sweet Sixteen
2005–06	Mike Krzyzewski	32–4	14–2	1st	NCAA Sweet Sixteen
2006–07	Mike Krzyzewski	22–11	8–8	T-6th	NCAA Round of 64
2007–08	Mike Krzyzewski	28–6	13–3	2nd	NCAA Round of 32
2008–09	Mike Krzyzewski	30–7	11–5	T-2nd	NCAA Sweet Sixteen
2009–10	Mike Krzyzewski	35–5	13–3	T-1st	National champions
2010–11	Mike Krzyzewski	32–5	13–3	2nd	NCAA Sweet Sixteen
2011–12	Mike Krzyzewski	27–7	13–3	2nd	NCAA Round of 64
2012–13	Mike Krzyzewski	30–6	14–4	2nd	NCAA Elite Eight
2013–14	Mike Krzyzewski	26–9	13–5	3rd	NCAA Round of 64
2014–15	Mike Krzyzewski	35–4	15–3	2nd	National champions
2015–16	Mike Krzyzewski	25–11	11–7	T-5th	NCAA Sweet Sixteen
2016–17	Mike Krzyzewski	28–9	11–7	5th	NCAA Round of 32
2017–18	Mike Krzyzewski	29–8	13–5	2nd	NCAA Elite Eight
2018–19	Mike Krzyzewski	32–6	14–4	3rd	NCAA Elite Eight
2019–20	Mike Krzyzewski	25–6	15–5	T-2nd	— (Note: Due to the COVID-19 pandemic, the 2020 ACC tournament was cancelled after the second round, and the 2020 NCAA tournament was cancelled entirely.)
2020–21	Mike Krzyzewski	13–11	9–9	10th	—
2021–22	Mike Krzyzewski	32–7	16–4	1st	NCAA Final Four
Mike Krzyzewski:		1129–309 (.785)	466–193 (.707)		
Jon Scheyer (Atlantic Coast Conference) (2022–present)
2022–23	Jon Scheyer	27–9	14–6	T-3rd	NCAA Round of 32
2023–24	Jon Scheyer	27–9	15–5	2nd	NCAA Elite Eight
2024–25	Jon Scheyer	35–4	19–1	1st	NCAA Final Four
2025–26	Jon Scheyer	35–3	17–1	1st	NCAA Elite Eight
Jon Scheyer:		124–25 (.832)	65–13 (.833)		
Total:		1248–333 (.789)	531–206 (.720)		
National champion Postseason invitational champion Conference regular season champion Conference regular season and conference tournament champion Division regular season champion Division regular season and conference tournament champion Conference tournament champion

=== NCAA tournament seeding history ===
The NCAA began seeding the tournament with the 1978 edition.

Years									'78	'79
Seeds									1Q	2
Years	'80	'81	'82	'83	'84	'85	'86	'87	'88	'89
Seeds	4	–	–	–	3	3	1	5	2	2
Years	'90	'91	'92	'93	'94	'95	'96	'97	'98	'99
Seeds	3	2	1	3	2	–	8	2	1	1
Years	'00	'01	'02	'03	'04	'05	'06	'07	'08	'09
Seeds	1	1	1	3	1	1	1	6	2	2
Years	'10	'11	'12	'13	'14	'15	'16	'17	'18	'19
Seeds	1	1	2	2	3	1	4	2	2	1
Years	'20	'21	'22	'23	'24	'25	'26			
Seeds	–	–	2	5	4	1	1			

=== National championships ===
Year	Coach	Opponent	Score	Record
1991	Mike Krzyzewski	Kansas Jayhawks	72–65	32–7
1992	Mike Krzyzewski	Michigan Wolverines	71–51	34–2
2001	Mike Krzyzewski	Arizona Wildcats	82–72	35–4
2010	Mike Krzyzewski	Butler Bulldogs	61–59	35–5
2015	Mike Krzyzewski	Wisconsin Badgers	68–63	35–4
National championships			5

1991 NCAA tournament results
Round	Opponent	Score
Round #1	#15 NE Louisiana	102–73
Round #2	#7 Iowa	85–70
Sweet 16	#11 Connecticut	81–67
Elite 8	#4 St. John's	78–61
Final 4	#1 UNLV	79–77
Championship	#3 Kansas	72–65

1992 NCAA tournament results
Round	Opponent	Score
Round #1	#16 Campbell	82–56
Round #2	#9 Iowa	75–62
Sweet 16	#4 Seton Hall	81–69
Elite 8	#2 Kentucky	104–103
Final 4	#2 Indiana	81–78
Championship	#6 Michigan	71–51

2001 NCAA tournament results
Round	Opponent	Score
Round #1	#16 Monmouth	95–52
Round #2	#9 Missouri	94–81
Sweet 16	#4 UCLA	76–63
Elite 8	#6 USC	79–69
Final 4	#3 Maryland	95–84
Championship	#2 Arizona	82–72

2010 NCAA tournament results
Round	Opponent	Score
Round #1	#16 Arkansas-Pine Bluff	73–44
Round #2	#8 California	68–53
Sweet 16	#4 Purdue	70–57
Elite 8	#3 Baylor	78–71
Final 4	#2 West Virginia	78–57
Championship	#5 Butler	61–59

2015 NCAA tournament results
Round	Opponent	Score
Round #1	#16 Robert Morris	85–56
Round #2	#8 San Diego St	68–49
Sweet 16	#5 Utah	63–57
Elite 8	#2 Gonzaga	66–52
Final 4	#7 Michigan St	81–61
Championship	#1 Wisconsin	68–63

=== Final Four history ===
1963–Third Place	1964–Finalist	1966–Third Place	1978–Finalist
1986–Finalist	1988–Semifinalist	1989–Semifinalist	1990–Finalist
1991–Champion	1992–Champion	1994–Finalist	1999–Finalist
2001–Champion	2004–Semifinalist	2010–Champion	2015–Champion
2022–Semifinalist	2025–Semifinalist

=== Complete NCAA tournament results ===
The Blue Devils have appeared in the NCAA tournament 48 times. Their combined record is 127–42.

Year	Seed	Round	Opponent	Result
1955		First Round	Villanova	L 73–74
1960		First Round; Sweet Sixteen; Elite Eight	Princeton; St. Joseph's; NYU	W 84–60; W 58–56; L 59–74
1963		Sweet Sixteen; Elite Eight; Final Four; National 3rd Place Game	NYU; St. Joseph's; Loyola–Chicago; Oregon State	W 81–76; W 73–59; L 75–94; W 85–63
1964		Sweet Sixteen; Elite Eight; Final Four; National Championship	Villanova; Connecticut; Michigan; UCLA	W 87–73; W 101–54; W 91–80; L 83–98
1966		Sweet Sixteen; Elite Eight; Final Four; National 3rd Place Game	St. Joseph's; Syracuse; Kentucky; Utah	W 76–74; W 91–81; L 79–83; W 79–77
1978		First Round; Sweet Sixteen; Elite Eight; Final Four; National Championship	Rhode Island; Penn; Villanova; Notre Dame; Kentucky	W 63–62; W 84–80; W 90–72; W 90–86; L 88–94
1979	#2	Second Round	#10 St. John's	L 78–80
1980	#4	Second Round; Sweet Sixteen; Elite Eight	#12 Penn #1 Kentucky #6 Purdue	W 52–42; W 55–54; L 60–68
1984	#3	Second Round	#6 Washington	L 78–80
1985	#3	First Round; Second Round	#14 Pepperdine #11 Boston College	W 75–62; L 73–74
1986	#1	First Round; Second Round; Sweet Sixteen; Elite Eight; Final Four; National Championship	#16 Mississippi Valley State #8 Old Dominion #12 DePaul #7 Navy #1 Kansas #2 Louisville	W 85–78; W 89–61; W 74–67; W 71–50; W 71–67; L 69–72
1987	#5	First Round; Second Round; Sweet Sixteen	#12 Texas A&M #13 Xavier #1 Indiana	W 58–51; W 65–50; L 82–88
1988	#2	First Round; Second Round; Sweet Sixteen; Elite Eight; Final Four	#15 Boston University #7 SMU #11 Rhode Island #1 Temple #6 Kansas	W 85–69; W 94–79; W 73–72; W 63–53; L 59–66
1989	#2	First Round; Second Round; Sweet Sixteen; Elite Eight; Final Four	#15 South Carolina State #7 West Virginia #11 Minnesota #1 Georgetown #3 Seton Hall	W 90–69; W 70–63; W 87–70; W 85–77; L 78–95
1990	#3	First Round; Second Round; Sweet Sixteen; Elite Eight; Final Four; National Championship	#14 Richmond #6 St. John's #7 UCLA #1 Connecticut #4 Arkansas #1 UNLV	W 81–46; W 76–72; W 90–81; W 79–78^{OT} W 97–83; L 73–103
1991	#2	First Round; Second Round; Sweet Sixteen; Elite Eight; Final Four; National Championship	#15 Northeast Louisiana #7 Iowa #11 Connecticut #4 St. John's #1 UNLV #3 Kansas	W 102–73; W 85–70; W 81–67; W 61–78; W 79–77; W 72–65
1992	#1	First Round; Second Round; Sweet Sixteen; Elite Eight; Final Four; National Championship	#16 Campbell #9 Iowa #4 Seton Hall #2 Kentucky #2 Indiana #6 Michigan	W 82–56; W 75–62; W 81–69; W 104–103^{OT} W 81–78; W 71–51
1993	#3	First Round; Second Round	#14 Southern Illinois #6 California	W 105–70; L 77–82
1994	#2	First Round; Second Round; Sweet Sixteen; Elite Eight; Final Four; National Championship	#15 Texas Southern #7 Michigan State #6 Marquette #1 Purdue #3 Florida #1 Arkansas	W 82–70; W 75–63; W 59–49; W 69–60; W 70–65; L 72–76
1996	#8	First Round	#9 Eastern Michigan	L 60–75
1997	#2	First Round; Second Round	#15 Murray State #10 Providence	W 71–68; L 87–98
1998	#1	First Round; Second Round; Sweet Sixteen; Elite Eight	#16 Radford #8 Oklahoma State #5 Syracuse #2 Kentucky	W 99–63; W 79–73; W 80–67; L 84–86
1999	#1	First Round; Second Round; Sweet Sixteen; Elite Eight; Final Four; National Championship	#16 Florida A&M #9 Tulsa #12 SW Missouri State #6 Temple #1 Michigan State #1 Connecticut	W 99–58; W 97–56; W 78–61; W 85–64; W 68–62; L 74–77
2000	#1	First Round; Second Round; Sweet Sixteen	#16 Lamar #8 Kansas #5 Florida	W 82–55; W 69–64; L 78–87
2001	#1	First Round; Second Round; Sweet Sixteen; Elite Eight; Final Four; National Championship	#16 Monmouth #9 Missouri #4 UCLA #6 USC #3 Maryland #2 Arizona	W 95–57; W 94–81; W 76–63; W 79–69; W 95–84; W 82–72
2002	#1	First Round; Second Round; Sweet Sixteen	#16 Winthrop #8 Notre Dame #5 Indiana	W 84–37; W 84–77; L 73–74
2003	#3	First Round; Second Round; Sweet Sixteen	#14 Colorado State #11 Central Michigan #2 Kansas	W 67–57; W 86–60; L 65–69
2004	#1	First Round; Second Round; Sweet Sixteen; Elite Eight; Final Four	#16 Alabama State #8 Seton Hall #5 Illinois #7 Xavier #2 Connecticut	W 96–61; W 90–62; W 72–62; W 66–63; L 78–79
2005	#1	First Round; Second Round; Sweet Sixteen	#16 Delaware State #9 Mississippi State #5 Michigan State	W 57–46; W 63–55; L 68–78
2006	#1	First Round; Second Round; Sweet Sixteen	#16 Southern #8 George Washington #4 LSU	W 70–54; W 74–61; L 54–62
2007	#6	First Round	#11 VCU	L 77–79
2008	#2	First Round; Second Round	#15 Belmont #7 West Virginia	W 71–70; L 67–73
2009	#2	First Round; Second Round; Sweet Sixteen	#15 Binghamton #7 Texas #3 Villanova	W 86–62; W 74–69; L 54–77
2010	#1	First Round; Second Round; Sweet Sixteen; Elite Eight; Final Four; National Championship	#16 Arkansas–Pine Bluff #8 California #4 Purdue #3 Baylor #2 West Virginia #5 Butler	W 73–44; W 68–53; W 70–57; W 78–71; W 78–57; W 61–59
2011	#1	Second Round; Third Round (Note: From 2011 to 2015, the round of 64 was known as the second round, and the round of 32 was known as the third round.); Sweet Sixteen	#16 Hampton #8 Michigan #5 Arizona	W 87–45; W 73–71; L 77–93
2012	#2	Second Round	#15 Lehigh	L 70–75
2013	#2	Second Round; Third Round; Sweet Sixteen; Elite Eight	#15 Albany #7 Creighton #3 Michigan State #1 Louisville	W 73–61; W 50–66; W 61–71; L 63–85
2014	#3	Second Round	#14 Mercer	L 71–78
2015	#1	Second Round; Third Round; Sweet Sixteen; Elite Eight; Final Four; National Championship	#16 Robert Morris #8 San Diego State #5 Utah #2 Gonzaga #7 Michigan State #1 Wisconsin	W 85–56; W 68–49; W 63–57; W 66–52; W 81–61; W 68–63
2016	#4	First Round; Second Round; Sweet Sixteen	#13 UNC Wilmington #12 Yale #1 Oregon	W 93–85; W 71–64; L 68–82
2017	#2	First Round; Second Round	#15 Troy #7 South Carolina	W 87–65; L 81–88
2018	#2	First Round; Second Round; Sweet Sixteen; Elite Eight	#15 Iona #7 Rhode Island #11 Syracuse #1 Kansas	W 89–67; W 87–62; W 69–65; L 81–85 OT
2019	#1	First Round; Second Round; Sweet Sixteen; Elite Eight	#16 North Dakota State #9 UCF #4 Virginia Tech #2 Michigan State	W 85–62; W 77–76; W 75–73; L 67–68
2022	#2	First Round; Second Round; Sweet Sixteen; Elite Eight; Final Four	#15 Cal State Fullerton #7 Michigan State #3 Texas Tech #4 Arkansas #8 North Carolina	W 78–61; W 85–76; W 78–73; W 78–69; L 77–81
2023	#5	First Round; Second Round	#12 Oral Roberts #4 Tennessee	W 74–51; L 52–65
2024	#4	First Round; Second Round; Sweet Sixteen; Elite Eight	#13 Vermont #12 James Madison #1 Houston #11 NC State	W 64–47; W 93–55; W 54–51; L 64–76
2025	#1	First Round; Second Round; Sweet Sixteen; Elite Eight; Final Four	#16 Mount St. Mary's #9 Baylor #4 Arizona #2 Alabama #1 Houston	W 93–49; W 89–66; W 100–93; W 85–65; L 67–70
2026	#1	First Round; Second Round; Sweet Sixteen; Elite Eight	#16 Siena #9 TCU #5 St John's #2 UConn	W 71–65; W 81–58; W 80–75; L 72–73

=== NIT results ===
The Blue Devils have appeared in the National Invitation Tournament (NIT) five times. Their combined record is 5–6.

Year	Round	Opponent	Result
1967	Quarterfinals	Southern Illinois	L 63–72
1968	First Round; Quarterfinals	Oklahoma City; Saint Peter's	W 97–81; L 71–100
1970	First Round	Utah	L 75–78
1971	First Round; Quarterfinals; Semifinals; 3rd Place Game	Dayton; Tennessee; North Carolina; St. Bonaventure	W 68–60; W 78–64; L 69–73; L 88–92
1981	First Round; Second Round; Quarterfinals	North Carolina A&T; Alabama; Purdue	W 79–69; W 75–70; L 69–81

== Key statistics ==
As of the 2017–18 season, the Blue Devils' program record is as follows.

Overall
Years of basketball	119
First season	1905–06
Head coaches (all-time)	19
All games
All-time record	2,299–928 (.712)
Home record	961–174 (.847)
20+ win seasons	58
30+ win seasons	16
Conference games
Conference record	770–370 (.765)
Conference regular season championships	22
Conference tournament championships	25
NCAA tournament
NCAA appearances	46
NCAA tournament wins	121
Sweet Sixteens	32
Elite Eights	23
Final Fours	17
Championship games	11
Championships	5
As of 4 June 2015

Duke has been ranked as the #1 team in the nation 235 weeks in their history.

Duke had not lost a non-conference game at Cameron from 2000 until 2019, when SFASU beat Duke in overtime (85–83). Duke maintains a tradition of hosting the previous season's Division II national champion in an exhibition game each November.

== Cameron Indoor Stadium and fanbase ==
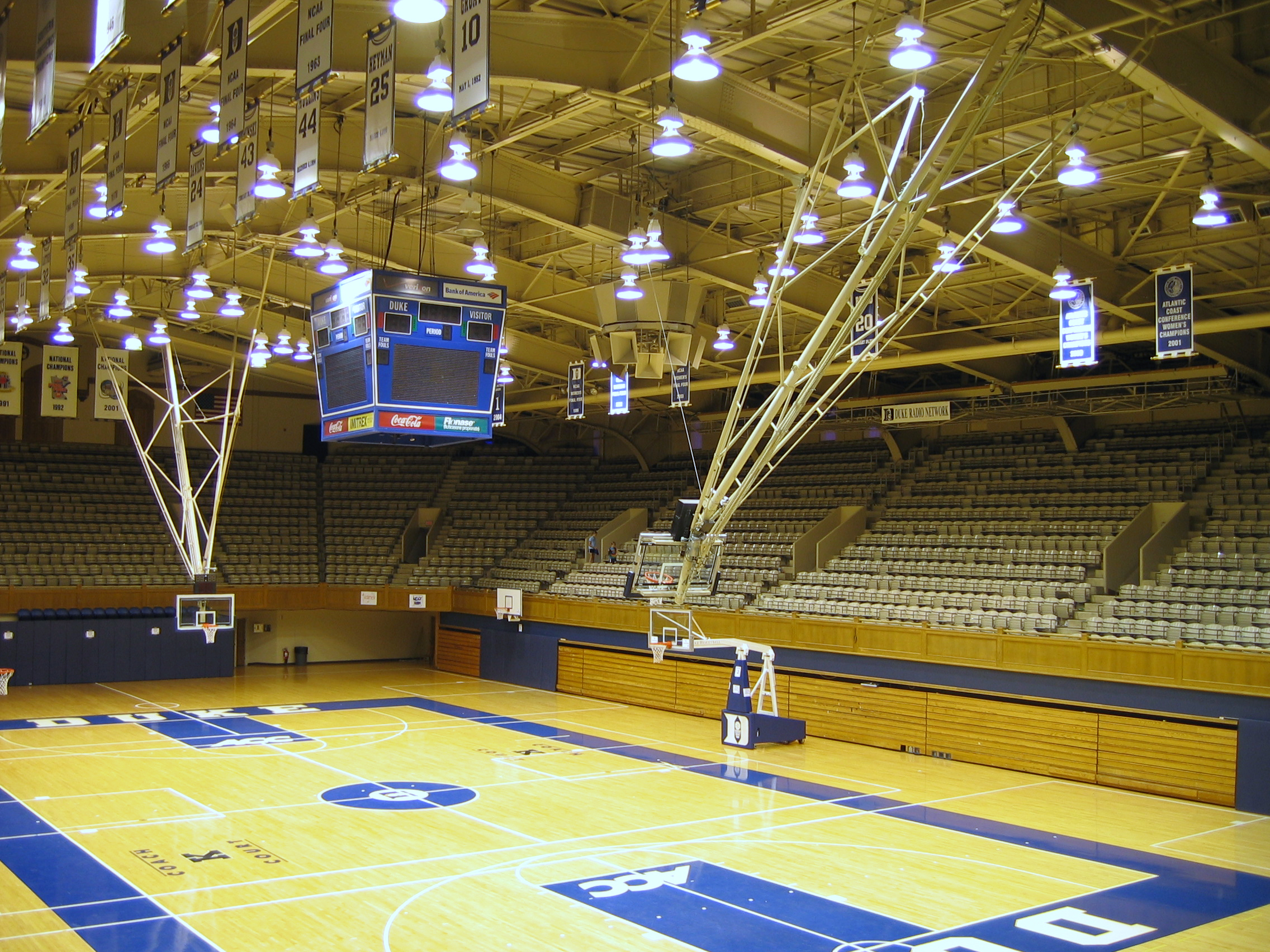
Cameron Indoor Stadium, home of the Blue Devils

Cameron Indoor Stadium was completed on January 6, 1940, having cost $400,000. At the time, it was the largest gymnasium in the country south of the Palestra at the University of Pennsylvania. Originally called Duke Indoor Stadium, it was renamed for Coach Cameron on January 22, 1972. The building originally included seating for 8,800, though standing room was sufficient to ensure that 12,000 could fit in on a particularly busy day. Then, as now, Duke students were allowed a large chunk of the seats, including those directly alongside the court. Renovations in 1987–1988 removed the standing room areas and added seats, bringing capacity to 9,314.

=== Cameron Crazies ===
Duke's men's basketball teams have had a decided home-court advantage for many years, in large part due to a student section along the length of the court populated by the Cameron Crazies. The hardwood floor has been dedicated and renamed Coach K Court in honor of head coach Mike Krzyzewski, and the tent city outside Cameron where students camp out before big games is known as Krzyzewskiville. In 1999, Sports Illustrated ranked Cameron the fourth best venue in all of professional and college sports, and USA Today referred to it as "the toughest road game in the nation".

=== Criticism ===
The Duke men's basketball team has been noted as a particularly hated team within the sport. Some of the hate comes from fans of rival teams, most notably the North Carolina Tar Heels. The hate is often tied to Duke's record, as the team has experienced success in most seasons since the late 1980s.

The hate is often tied to specific players. Christian Laettner, who played for Duke from 1988 to 1992 as they won two national championships, is often named as one of the most hated players in college basketball. The 2015 documentary I Hate Christian Laettner names five main reasons for the hate: "privilege, race, bully, greatness and looks".

JJ Redick, who played at Duke from 2002 to 2006 also experienced hatred and animosity from fans during his tenure. Another particularly hated player is Grayson Allen, who played for Duke from 2014 to 2018. In addition to many of the reasons Laettner was hated, Allen was also targeted after several incidents in which he deliberately tripped opposing players.

== Player awards ==
=== Retired numbers ===
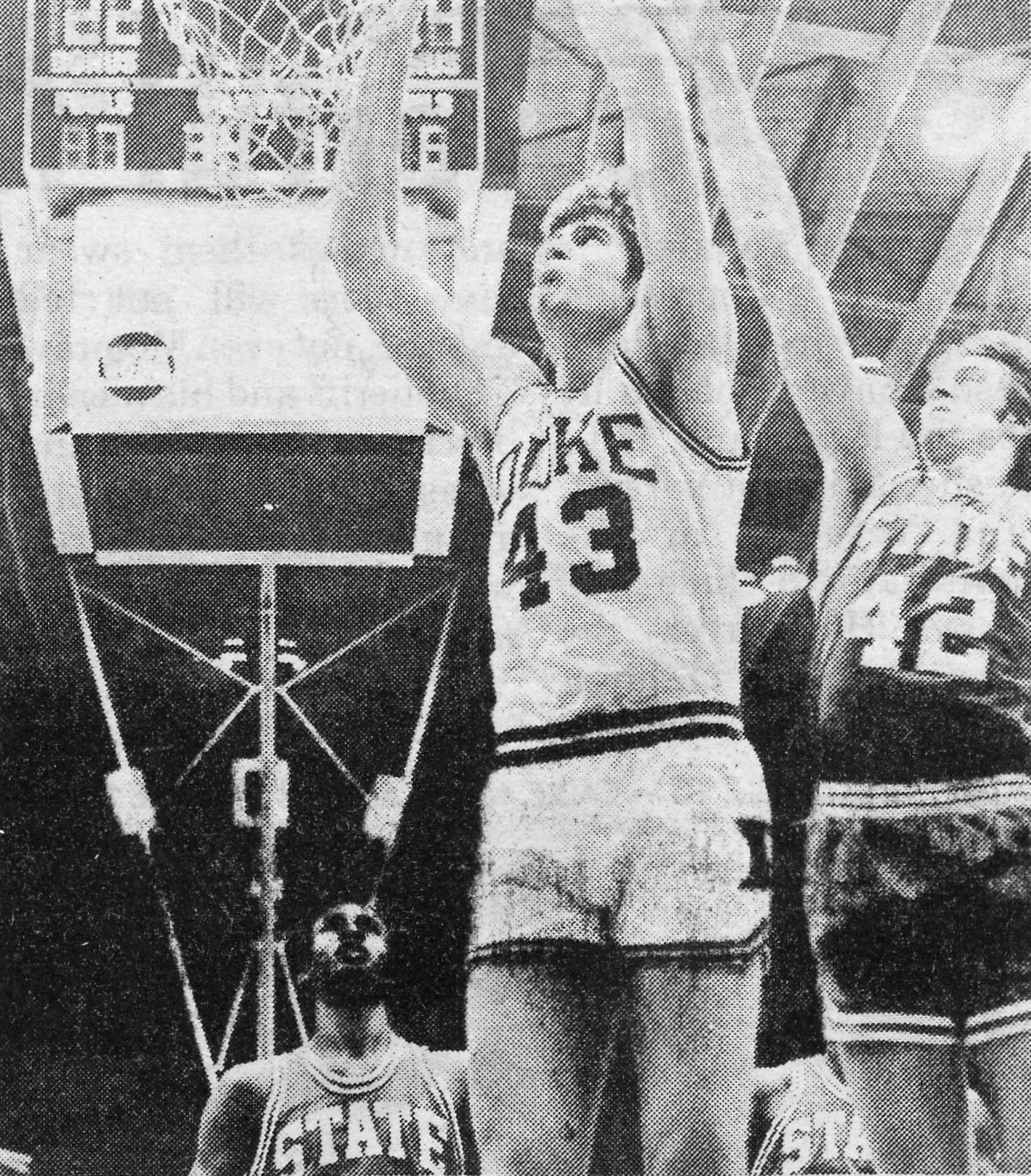
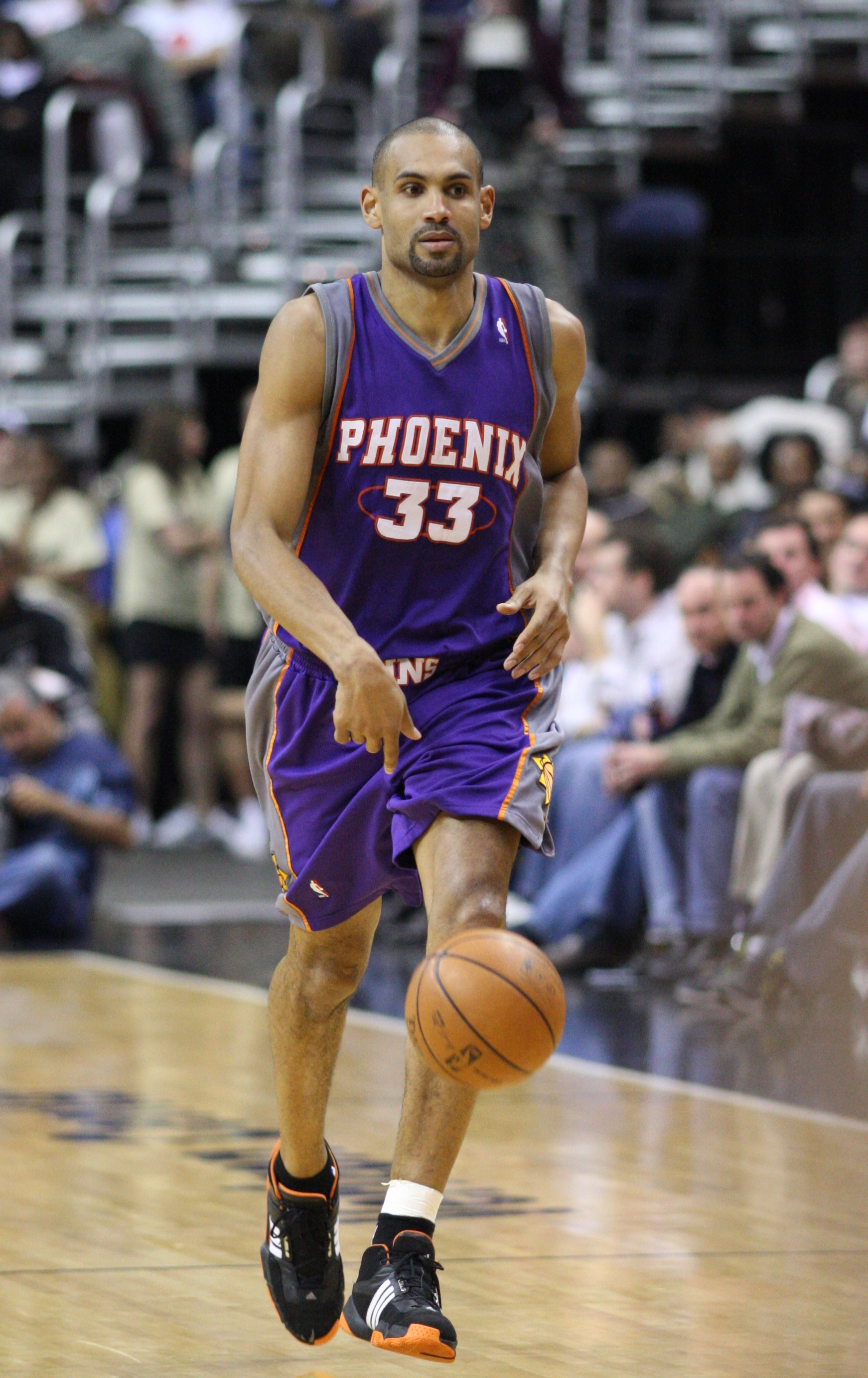
Mike Gminski (left) and Grant Hill have had their jersey numbers retired by the university.

No.	Player	Pos.	Tenure	No. ret.	Ref.
4	JJ Redick	SG	2002–06	2007	
10	Dick Groat	PG	1949–52	1952	
11	Bobby Hurley	PG	1989–93	1993	
22	Jay Williams	PG	1999–2002	2003	
23	Shelden Williams	PF	2002–06	2007	
24	Johnny Dawkins	PG	1982–86	1986	
25	Art Heyman	SF	1960–63	1990	
31	Shane Battier	SF	1997–2001	2001	
32	Christian Laettner	PF	1988–92	1992	
33	Grant Hill	SF	1990–94	1994	
35	Danny Ferry	PF	1985–89	1989	
43	Mike Gminski	C	1976–80	1980	
44	Jeff Mullins	SG	1961–64	1994	

=== National Players of the Year ===
- Dick Groat Helms, UPI
- Art Heyman AP, UPI, U.S. Basketball Writers
- Johnny Dawkins Naismith
- Danny Ferry Naismith, UPI, U.S. Basketball Writers
- Christian Laettner AP, Basketball Times, NABC, Naismith, Rupp, U.S. Basketball Writers, Wooden
- Elton Brand AP, NABC, Naismith, Rupp, U.S. Basketball Writers, Wooden, Sporting News
- Shane Battier AP, Basketball Times, Naismith, Rupp, U.S. Basketball Writers, Wooden, Sporting News
- Jay Williams AP, Basketball Times, NABC (2), Naismith, Rupp, U.S. Basketball Writers, Wooden, Sporting News
- JJ Redick AP, Basketball Times, NABC, Naismith, Rupp (2), U.S. Basketball Writers, Wooden, Sporting News
- Marvin Bagley III, NABC
- RJ Barrett, Wooden, USA Today
- Zion Williamson AP, NABC, Naismith, U.S. Basketball Writers, Wooden, Sporting News
- Cooper Flagg U.S. Basketball Writers, NABC
- Cameron Boozer Sporting News, U.S. Basketball Writers, Wooden, Naismith, AP, NABC

=== ACC Men's Basketball Player of the Year ===
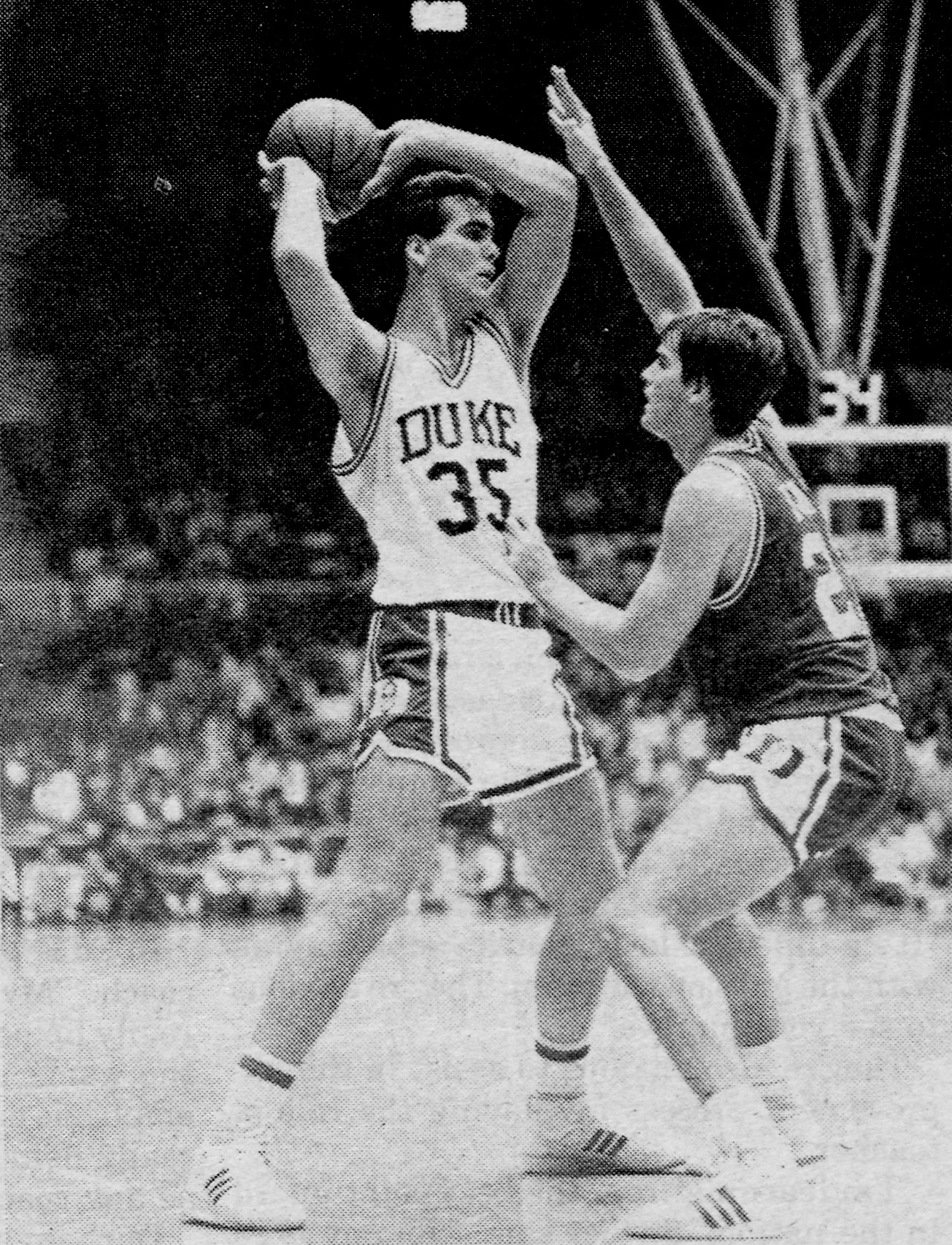
Danny Ferry was named ACC Player of the Year in 1988 & 1989.

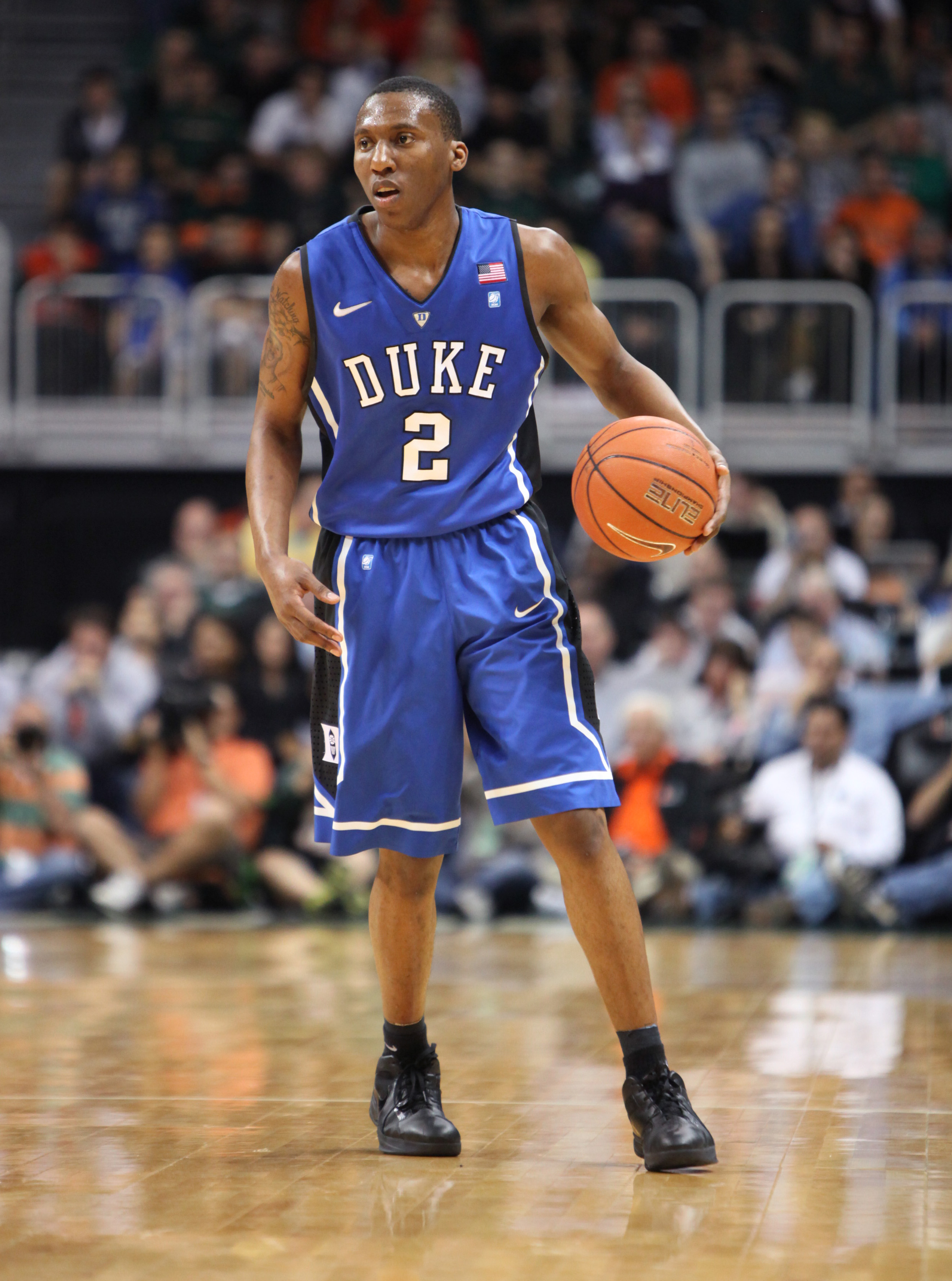
Nolan Smith was the ACC Player of the Year in 2011.

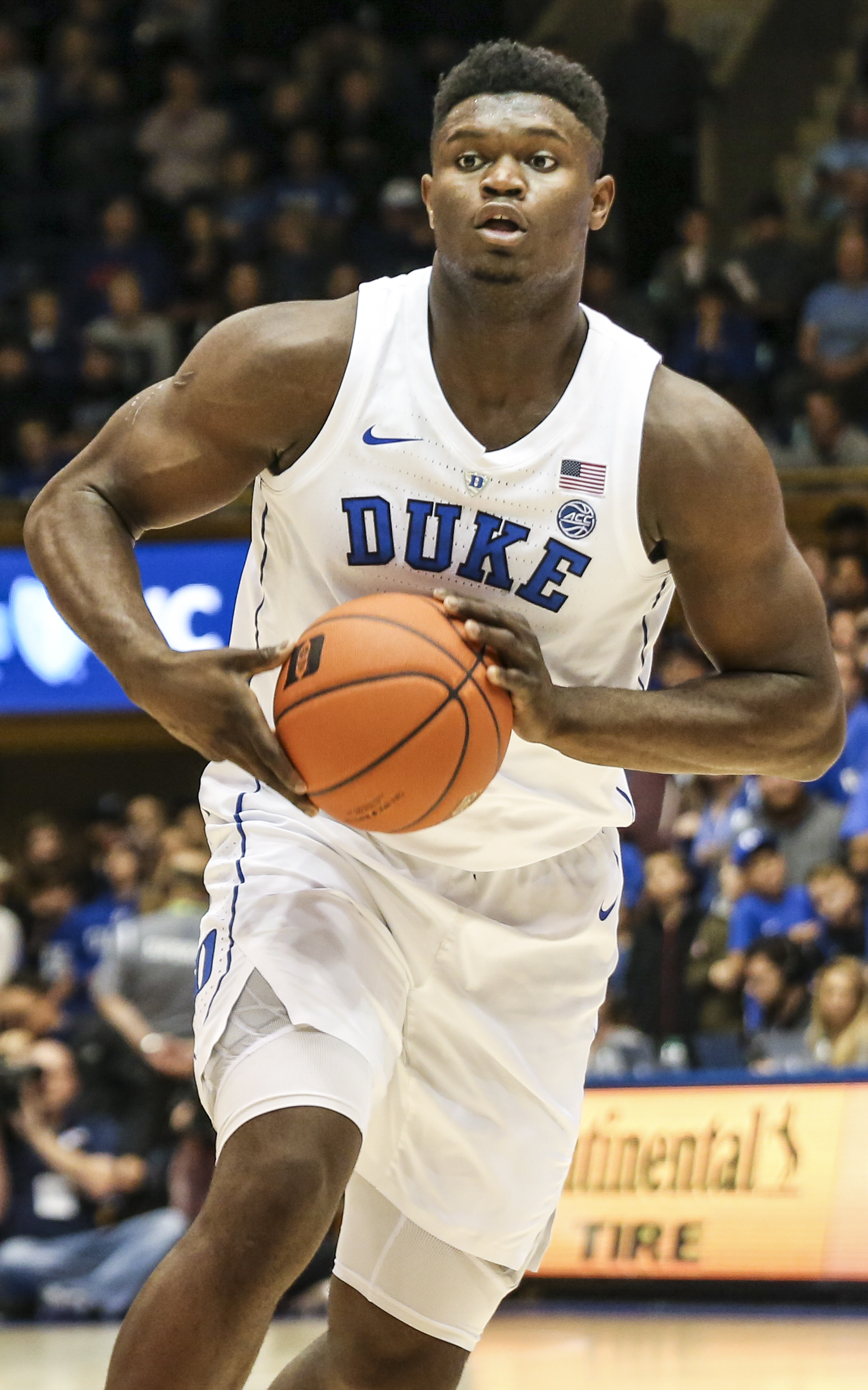
Zion Williamson was named ACC Player of the Year in 2019.

- Art Heyman (1963)
- Jeff Mullins (1964)
- Steve Vacendak (1966)
- Mike Gminski (1979)
- Danny Ferry (1988, 1989)
- Christian Laettner (1992)
- Grant Hill (1994)
- Elton Brand (1999)
- Chris Carrawell (2000)
- Shane Battier (2001)
- JJ Redick (2005, 2006)
- Nolan Smith (2011)
- Jahlil Okafor (2015)
- Marvin Bagley III (2018)
- Zion Williamson (2019)
- Tre Jones (2020)
- Cooper Flagg (2025)
- Cameron Boozer (2026)

=== ACC Rookies of the Year ===
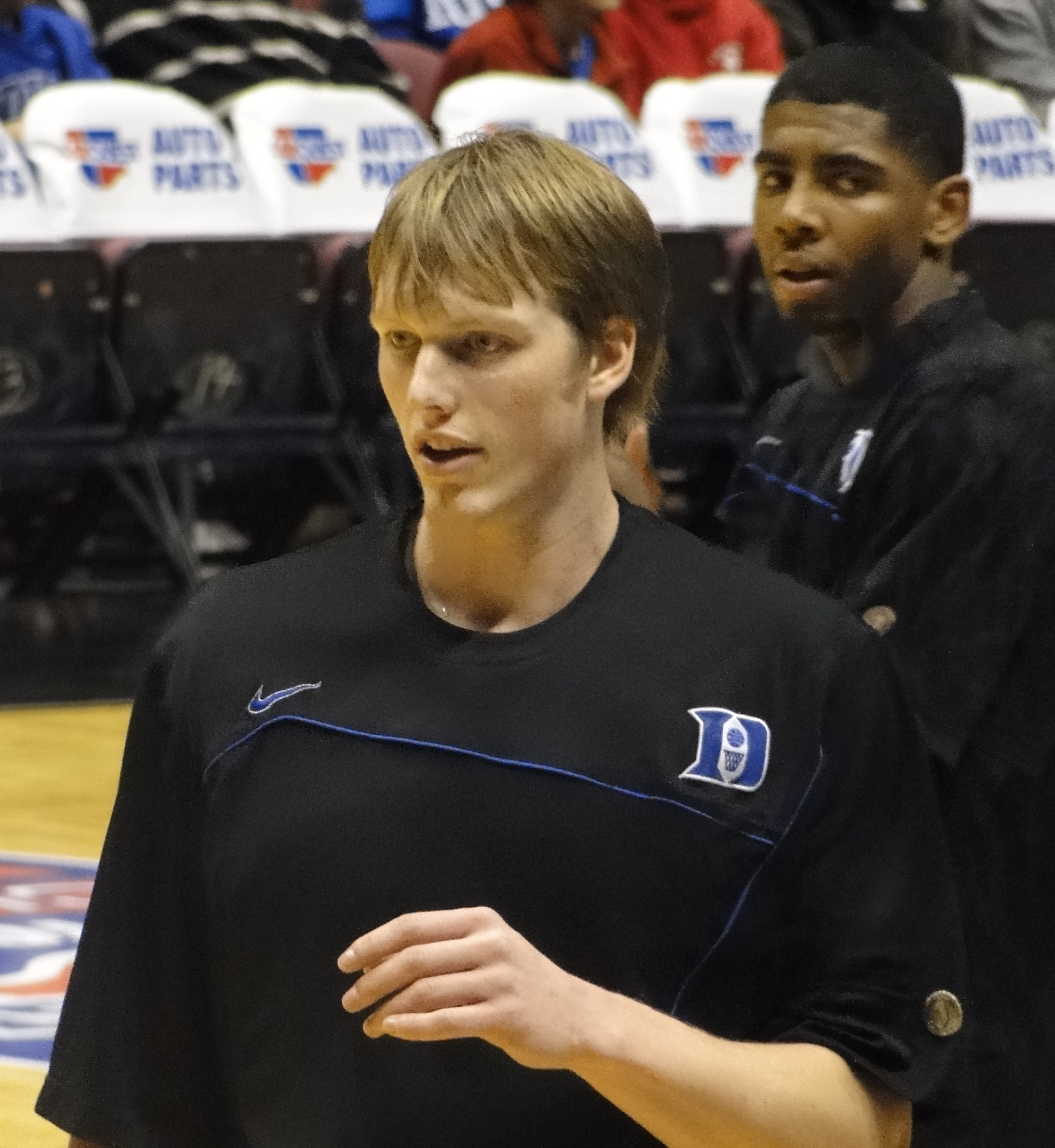
Kyle Singler was the ACC Rookie of the Year in 2008.

- Jim Spanarkel (1976)
- Mike Gminski (1977)
- Gene Banks (1978)
- Chris Duhon (2001)
- Kyle Singler (2008)
- Austin Rivers (2012)
- Jabari Parker (2014)
- Jahlil Okafor (2015)
- Brandon Ingram (2016)
- Marvin Bagley III (2018)
- Zion Williamson (2019)
- Vernon Carey Jr. (2020)
- Paolo Banchero (2022)
- Kyle Filipowski (2023)
- Cooper Flagg (2025)
- Cameron Boozer (2026)

=== National Defensive Player of the Year ===
- Tommy Amaker (1987)
- Billy King (1988)
- Grant Hill (1993)
- Steve Wojciechowski (1998)
- Shane Battier (1999, 2000, 2001)
- Shelden Williams (2005, 2006)

=== ACC Defensive Player of the Year ===
(since 2005)

- Shelden Williams (2005, 2006)
- DeMarcus Nelson (2008)
- Tre Jones (2020)
- Mark Williams (2022)
- Maliq Brown (2026)

=== Naismith Memorial Basketball Hall of Fame ===
- Mike Krzyzewski (2001)
- Grant Hill (2018)

=== McDonald's All-Americans ===
The following 78 McDonald's All-Americans have signed and played for Duke.

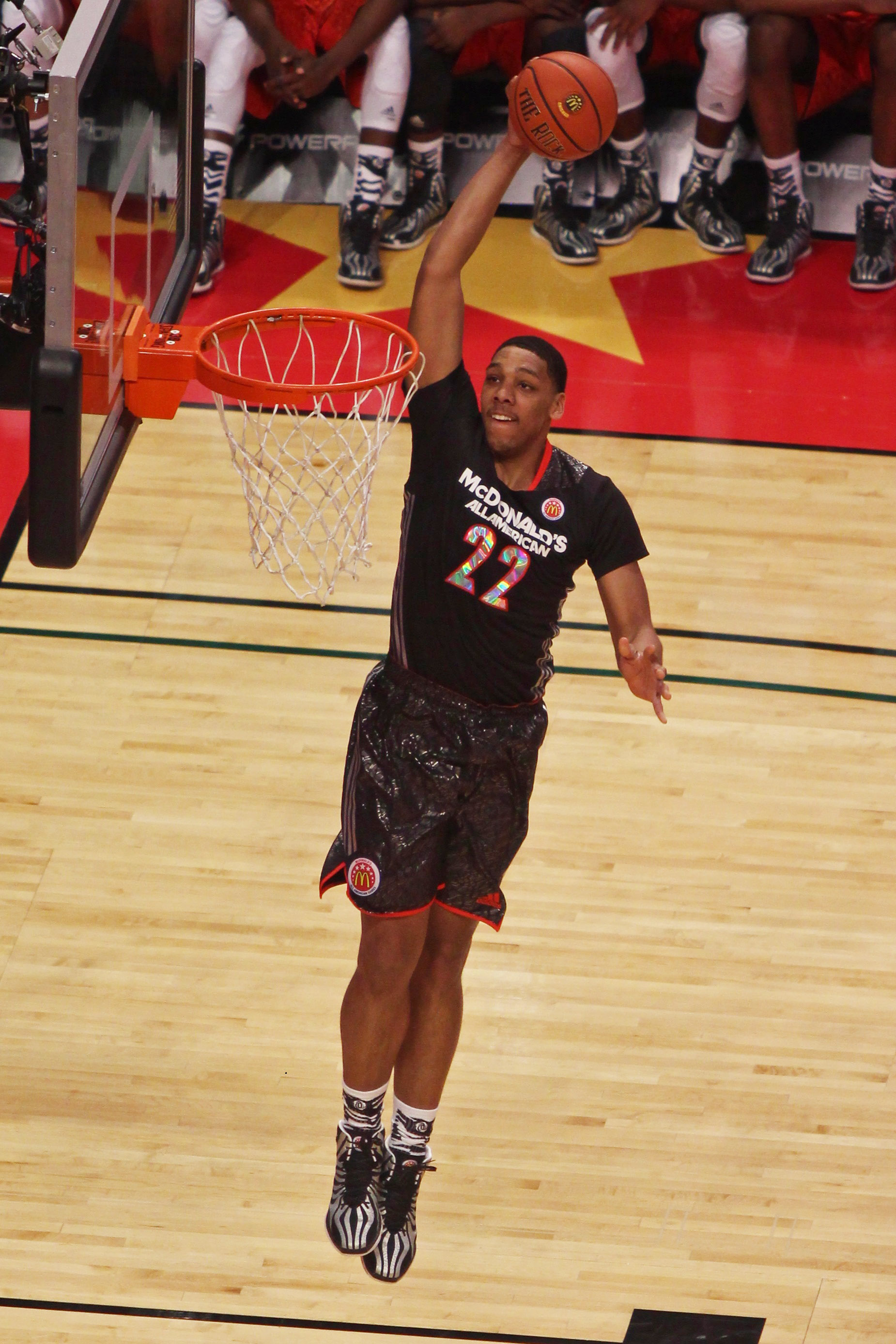
Jahlil Okafor from 2014 game

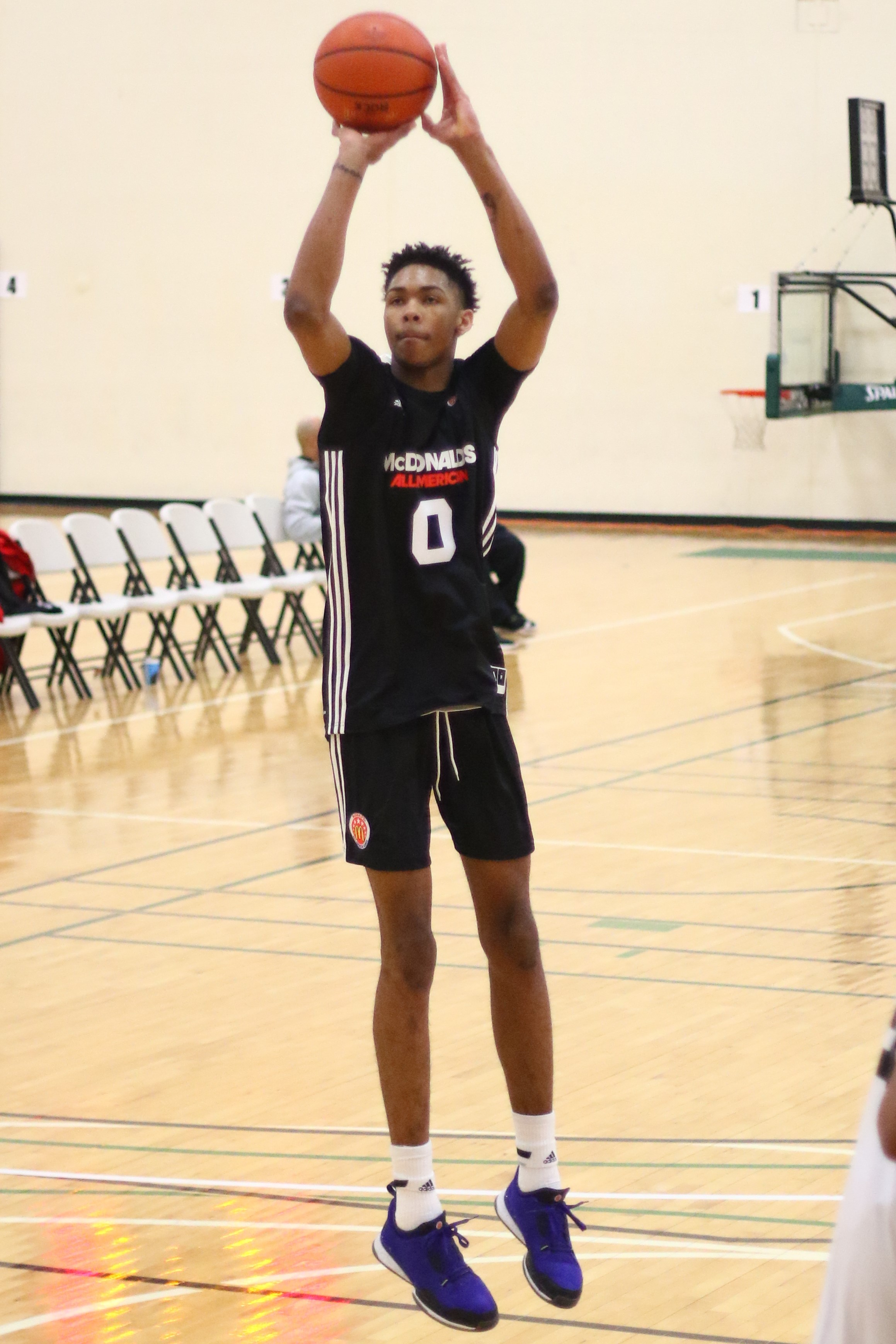
Brandon Ingram, 2015 McDonald's All-American

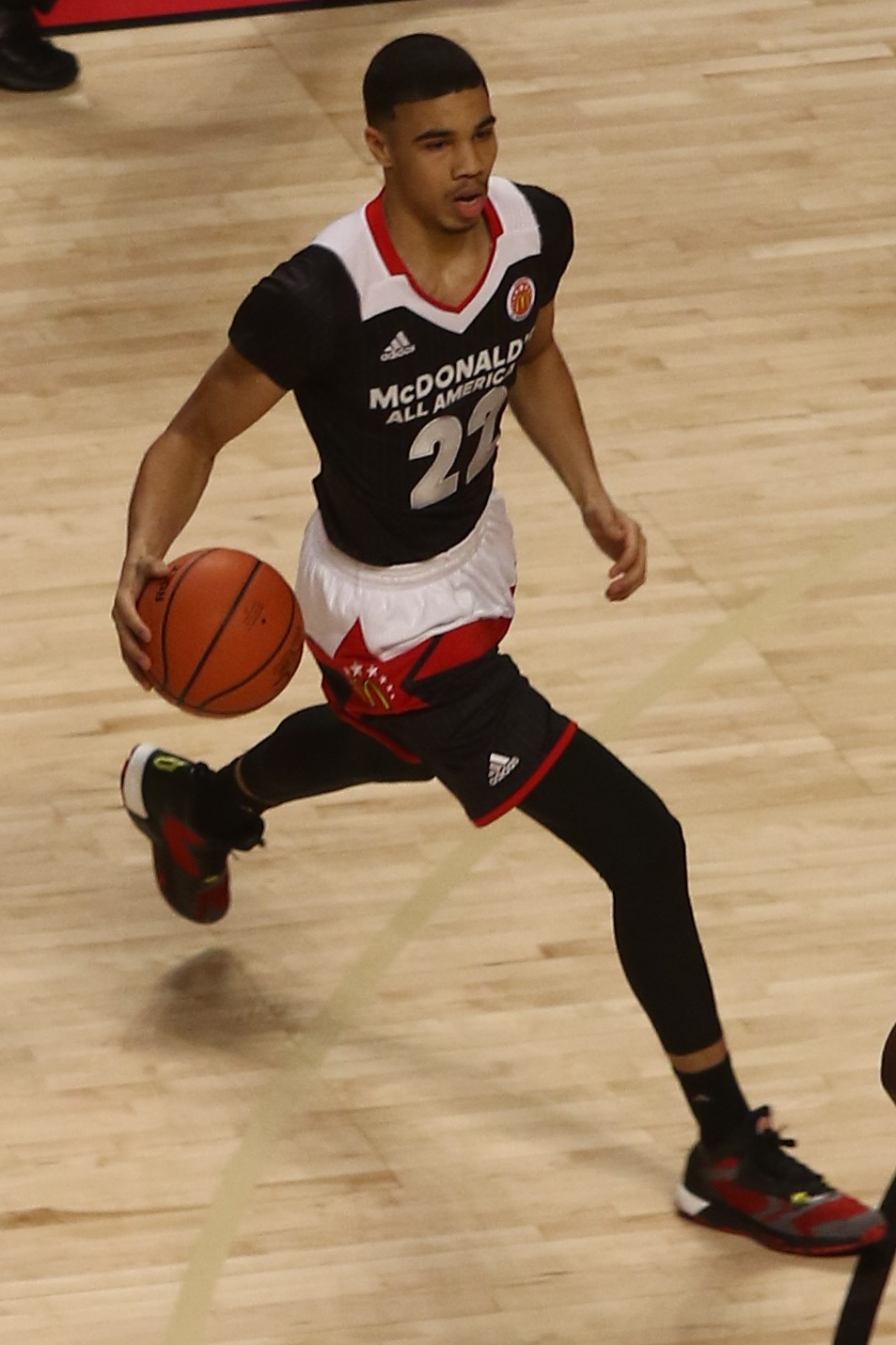
Jayson Tatum, 2016 McDonald's All-American

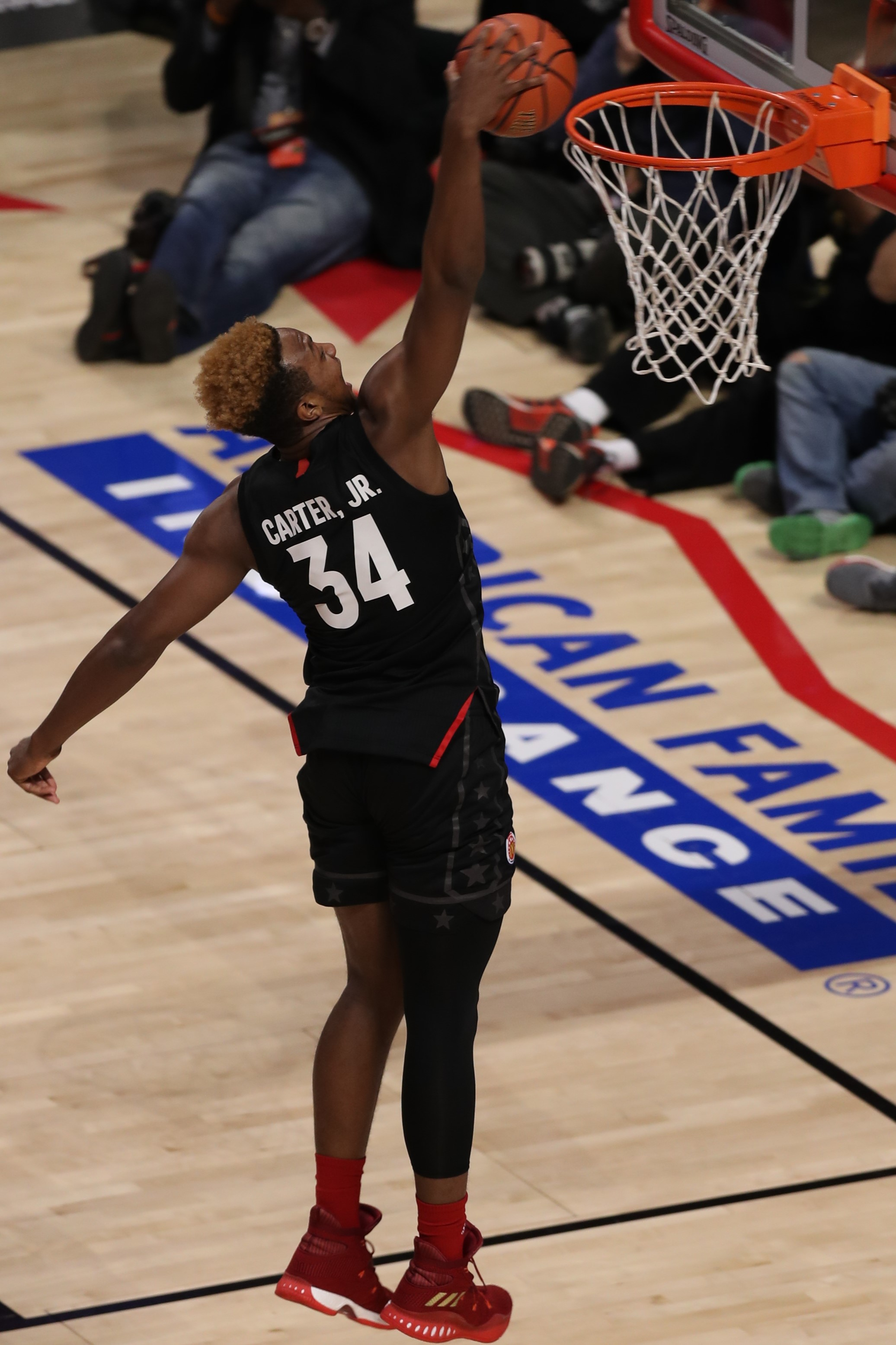
Wendell Carter Jr., 2017 McDonald's All-American

- 1977 – Gene Banks
- 1978 – Vince Taylor
- 1982 – Johnny Dawkins
- 1983 – Tommy Amaker & Martin Nessley
- 1985 – Danny Ferry & Quin Snyder
- 1986 – Alaa Abdelnaby & Phil Henderson
- 1988 – Christian Laettner & Crawford Palmer
- 1989 – Bobby Hurley & Billy McCaffrey
- 1990 – Grant Hill
- 1991 – Cherokee Parks
- 1992 – Chris Collins
- 1993 – Joey Beard
- 1994 – Trajan Langdon, Ricky Price & Steve Wojciechowski
- 1995 – Taymon Domzalski
- 1996 – Nate James
- 1997 – Elton Brand, Shane Battier & Chris Burgess
- 1998 – Corey Maggette
- 1999 – Carlos Boozer, Mike Dunleavy Jr., Casey Sanders & Jay Williams (basketball)
- 2000 – Chris Duhon
- 2001 – Daniel Ewing
- 2002 – Sean Dockery, JJ Redick, Shavlik Randolph & Michael Thompson
- 2003 – Luol Deng
- 2004 – DeMarcus Nelson
- 2005 – Eric Boateng, Greg Paulus & Josh McRoberts
- 2006 – Gerald Henderson Jr., Jon Scheyer & Lance Thomas
- 2007 – Taylor King, Kyle Singler & Nolan Smith
- 2008 – Elliot Williams
- 2009 – Ryan Kelly & Mason Plumlee
- 2010 – Kyrie Irving
- 2011 – Quinn Cook, Marshall Plumlee & Austin Rivers
- 2012 – Amile Jefferson & Rasheed Sulaimon
- 2013 – Matt Jones & Jabari Parker
- 2014 – Grayson Allen, Tyus Jones, Jahlil Okafor & Justise Winslow
- 2015 – Brandon Ingram, Chase Jeter & Luke Kennard
- 2016 – Marques Bolden, Frank Jackson & Jayson Tatum
- 2017 – Wendell Carter Jr., Trevon Duval & Gary Trent Jr.
- 2018 – RJ Barrett, Tre Jones, Cam Reddish & Zion Williamson
- 2019 – Vernon Carey Jr., Matthew Hurt & Wendell Moore Jr.
- 2020 – Jeremy Roach, DJ Steward, Mark Williams
- 2021 – Paolo Banchero & AJ Griffin
- 2022 – Dereck Lively II, Mark Mitchell & Dariq Whitehead
- 2023 – Jared McCain & Sean Stewart
- 2024 – Isaiah Evans & Cooper Flagg

== Current Blue Devils in the NBA and international leagues ==
As of July 21, 2026, these former Blue Devils players were in the NBA:

- Kyrie Irving (2011) – Dallas Mavericks
- Seth Curry (2013) – free agent
- Mason Plumlee (2013) – free agent
- Tyus Jones (2015) – Denver Nuggets
- Brandon Ingram (2016) – Los Angeles Clippers
- Luke Kennard (2017) – Phoenix Suns
- Jayson Tatum (2017) – Boston Celtics
- Grayson Allen (2018) – Charlotte Hornets
- Marvin Bagley III (2018) – Denver Nuggets
- Wendell Carter Jr. (2018) – Orlando Magic
- Gary Trent Jr. (2018) – Milwaukee Bucks
- RJ Barrett (2019) – Toronto Raptors
- Cam Reddish (2019) – free agent
- Zion Williamson (2019) – New Orleans Pelicans
- Tre Jones (2020) – Chicago Bulls
- Jalen Johnson (2021) – Atlanta Hawks
- Paolo Banchero (2022) – Orlando Magic
- Mark Williams (2022) – Phoenix Suns
- Wendell Moore Jr. (2022) – Detroit Pistons
- Dereck Lively II (2023) – Dallas Mavericks
- Dariq Whitehead (2023) – Brooklyn Nets
- Jared McCain (2024) – Oklahoma City Thunder
- Kyle Filipowski (2024) – Utah Jazz
- Cooper Flagg (2025) – Dallas Mavericks
- Kon Knueppel (2025) – Charlotte Hornets
- Khaman Maluach (2025) – Phoenix Suns
- Tyrese Proctor (2025) – Cleveland Cavaliers
- Cameron Boozer (2026) – Memphis Grizzlies
- Maliq Brown (2026) – San Antonio Spurs
- Isaiah Evans (2026) – Minnesota Timberwolves

=== Former Blue Devils in international leagues ===
- Joey Baker – Joondalup Wolves
- Marques Bolden – Ironi Ness Ziona B.C.
- Javin DeLaurier – Promitheas Patras B.C.
- Trevon Duval – Manisa Büyükşehir Belediyespor
- Harry Giles III - Shanxi Loongs
- Jacob Grandison – Vilpas Vikings
- Matthew Hurt – South East Melbourne Phoenix
- Frank Jackson – Nanterre 92
- Jahlil Okafor – Capitanes de Arecibo
- Jabari Parker – FC Barcelona
- Jeremy Roach – Wilki Morskie Szczecin
- Cassius Stanley – BC Šiauliai
- DJ Steward – Aquila Basket Trento
- Jack White – Melbourne United

== Rivalries ==
The Duke–North Carolina rivalry is often ranked among the top rivalries in both college basketball and all North American sports. Entering the 2023 - 2024 season, North Carolina leads the rivalry, winning 141 games to Duke's 115. The Duke Blue Devils face the North Carolina Tar Heels twice each year during ACC play, with thousands of Duke undergraduate students participating in an annual tradition of camping out in Krzyzewskiville, a lawn in front of Cameron Indoor Stadium, for months to line up for admission into the rivalry game. The two teams always face each other for their last game of the regular season, with the home team hosting their Senior Night. Some years, the two teams meet for a third game in the ACC tournament. The teams have met twice in post-season tournament play. In 2022, the two schools met in the Final Four to face each other in the NCAA Tournament for the first time. In that game, the Tar Heels defeated the Blue Devils 81–77. In 1971 the two rivals met in the semi-finals of the NIT, a game also won by North Carolina by a score of 73 - 69. Duke also has rivalries with NC State and Wake Forest, and together with UNC, the 4 schools form Tobacco Road.

Duke and North Carolina have combined for 11 national championships, with North Carolina leading Duke 6–5. The intensity of the rivalry is augmented by the proximity of the two universities, located only ten miles apart along U.S. Highway 15–501 (also known as Tobacco Road) or eight miles apart in straight-line distance in the cities of Durham and Chapel Hill. In addition, Duke is a private university whereas North Carolina is a public school; the vastly different funding structures and cultures between the two further contribute to the intensity of the rivalry.

Former Esquire editor and author (and North Carolina graduate) Will Blythe argues that the rivalry's passion can be attributed greatly to class and culture in the South.

To legions of otherwise reasonable adults, it is a conflict that surpasses sports; it is locals against outsiders, elitists against populists, even good against evil... The rivalry may be a way of aligning oneself with larger philosophic ideals — of choosing teams in life — a tradition of partisanship that reveals the pleasures and even the necessity of hatred.

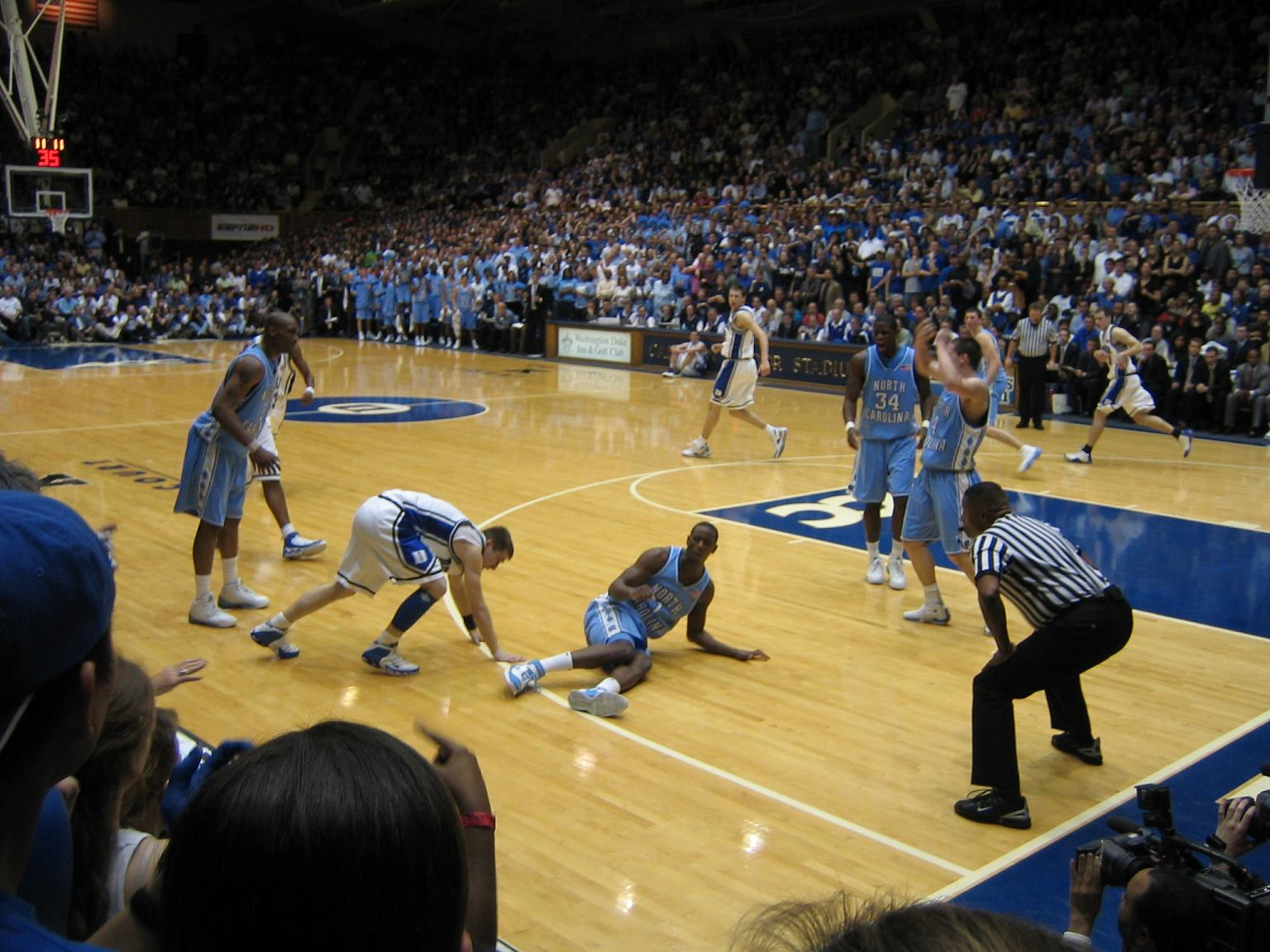
The March 4, 2006 game was the most watched college basketball game in ESPN history.

The rivalry has been the subject of various books and articles, including To Hate Like This Is to Be Happy Forever by Blythe and Blue Blood by Art Chansky.

Further illustrating the intensity of the rivalry, U.S. Representative Brad Miller, a die-hard Carolina fan, told an Associated Press writer in 2012, "I have said very publicly that if Duke was playing against the Taliban, then I'd have to pull for the Taliban."

However, also due to the close proximity of the two schools, there is respect and collaboration within the rivalry. Inspired by the men's basketball teams, twenty-four students from the two schools got together from January 14–16, 2006 in order to attempt to break the world record for the longest continuous game of basketball ever recorded. The game set a new world record at 57 hours, 17 minutes and 41 seconds with Duke winning the game 3699–3444. All $60,000 raised from the marathon benefited the Hoop Dreams Basketball Academy, an organization which helps children with life-threatening illnesses develop successful life skills through basketball.

Beyond athletics, the school papers have also engaged in the rivalry. As a tradition, one day prior to a Duke-North Carolina basketball game, The Chronicle, Duke's student newspaper, publishes a spoof cover page for the day's edition with the title The Daily Tar Hole. Contained within are satirical stories poking fun at The Daily Tar Heel and the North Carolina Tar Heels. The Daily Tar Heel typically publishes former columnist Ian Williams' "Insider's guide to hating Duke" for the two basketball match-ups each year. There is a longstanding agreement that if Duke wins the first matchup, The Daily Tar Heel's masthead is printed in Duke blue, and if North Carolina wins the first matchup, The Chronicle's masthead is painted Carolina blue. The losing school's paper also has to put the other school's logo in a conspicuous location and claim that the winning school is "still the best." The Michigan Wolverines and the Maryland Terrapins basketball teams have also claimed rivalries against the Blue Devils.

== By the numbers ==
- All-time wins – 2,271
- All-time winning percentage – .712
- NCAA championships – 5
- NCAA tournament runner-up – 6
- All-Americans – 49 players
- ACC regular season titles – 23
- ACC tournament titles – 24 (most all-time)
- NCAA championship games – 11
- NCAA Final Fours – 18
- NCAA tournament appearances – 47
- NCAA tournament wins – 121
- No. 1 seeds in the NCAA tournament – 14
- Number of weeks ranked all-time in the top 25 of the AP Poll – 870
- Number of times defeating the No. 1 ranked team in the country – 11

=== Victories over AP No. 1 team ===
Duke has 11 victories over the AP number one ranked team.

- January 27, 1958 – NR Duke 72, No. 1 West Virginia 68
- December 10, 1965 – No. 8 Duke 82, No. 1 UCLA 66
- December 11, 1965 – No. 8 Duke 94, No. 1 UCLA 75
- March 11, 1984 – No. 16 Duke 77, No. 1 North Carolina 75
- March 26, 1988 – No. 5 Duke 63, No. 1 Temple 53
- March 30, 1991 – No. 2 Duke 79, No. 1 UNLV 77
- December 5, 1992 – No. 4 Duke 79, No. 1 Michigan 68
- November 26, 1997 – No. 4 Duke 95, No. 1 Arizona 87
- February 22, 2014 – No. 5 Duke 66, No. 1 Syracuse 60
- November 26, 2021 – No. 5 Duke 84, No. 1 Gonzaga 81
- February 21, 2026 - No. 3 Duke 68, No. 1 Michigan 63

== See also ==
- Duke Blue Devils women's basketball
