= Krzyzewskiville =

Queue for major Duke Blue Devils men's basketball games

Coordinates: 35.99728°N 78.94049°W

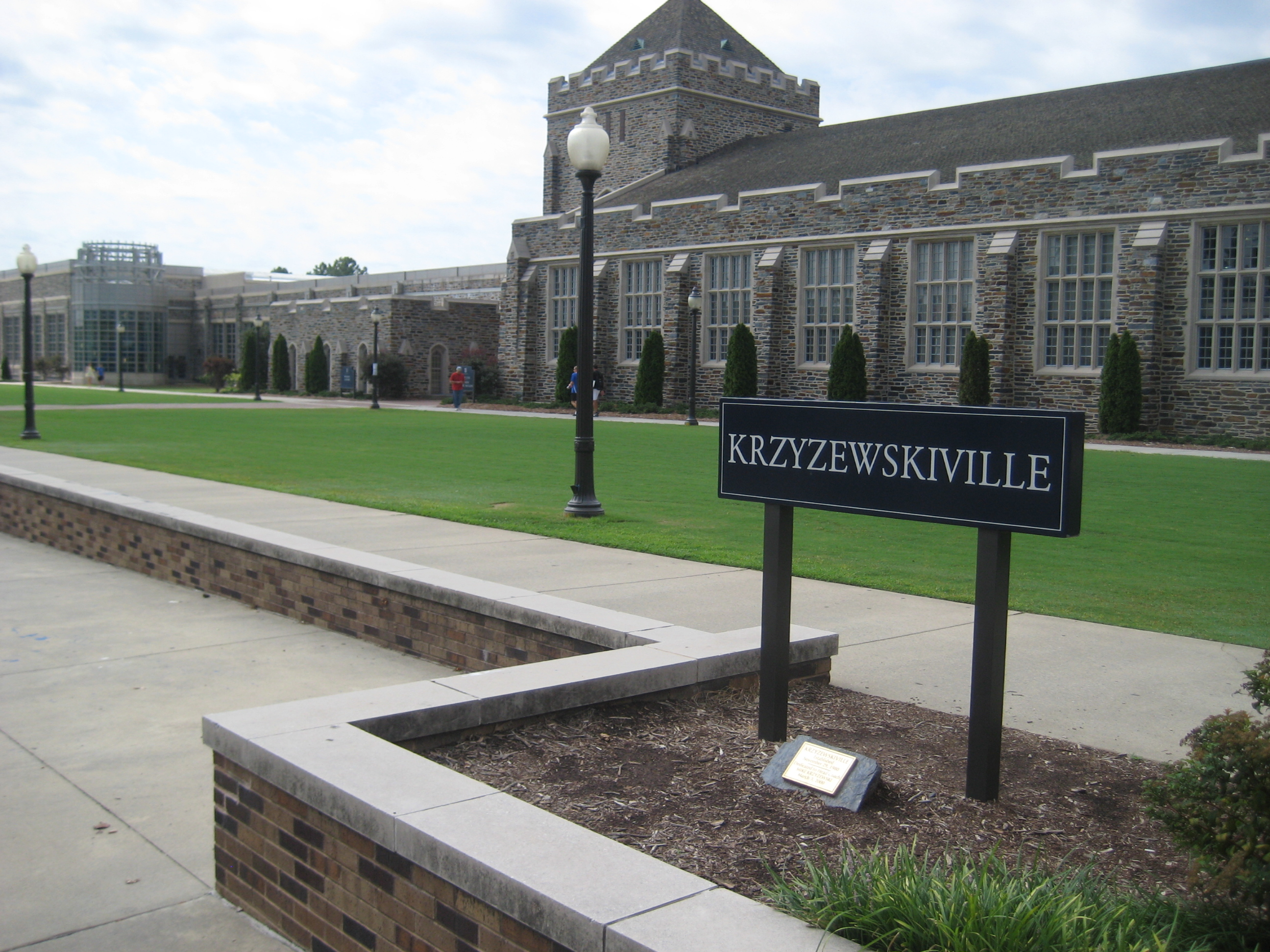
The area outside of Cameron Indoor Stadium, called "Krzyzewskiville", where students camp out for men's basketball tickets.

Krzyzewskiville, or K-ville for short, is a phenomenon that occurs before major men's basketball games at Duke University. In simplest terms, it is the line for undergraduate students wishing to gain access to the designated tenting games. It is often mistakenly referred to as a ticket line. However, there are no student tickets; students are admitted from the line an hour and a half before each game.

Krzyzewskiville is named for former head coach Mike Krzyzewski, often called "Coach K", the much loved coach who coached Duke from 1980 to 2022, and helped make Duke's basketball program one of the best in the nation. He was known to buy pizza for the K-ville residents from time to time and held open-forum "team meetings" with the Cameron Crazies before games against their arch-rival, the North Carolina Tar Heels.

Graduate and professional students do not participate in Krzyzewskiville, as Duke's Graduate and Professional Student Council operates a separate weekend-long campout each September followed by a lottery for a small number of graduate and professional student season tickets.

== The first K-ville ==
While lining up hours before games (the annual game vs. the University of North Carolina in particular) had always been a regular practice, every now and then a group of students would be ambitious enough to get their sleeping bags out and sleep in line the night before in order to ensure their front row seats. In 1986 Kimberly Reed, a senior and former resident of the Mirecourt selective living group, took the practice one step further and decided with a group of her Mirecourt friends to line up even earlier for the UNC game and sleep in tents. Showing up on Thursday for the Sunday tip-off, the fifteen or so friends set up four or five tents and prepared to sleep outside of Cameron Indoor Stadium. They were quickly noticed by the rest of the student body, and by game time there were 70-75 tents in line to see Duke battle their long-standing rival UNC. The NBC news crew put them on the evening news, and they made the front page of USA Today. Their dedication was rewarded with an 85-72 Duke victory, and tenting in K-ville quickly became a Duke University tradition.

== K-ville rules ==
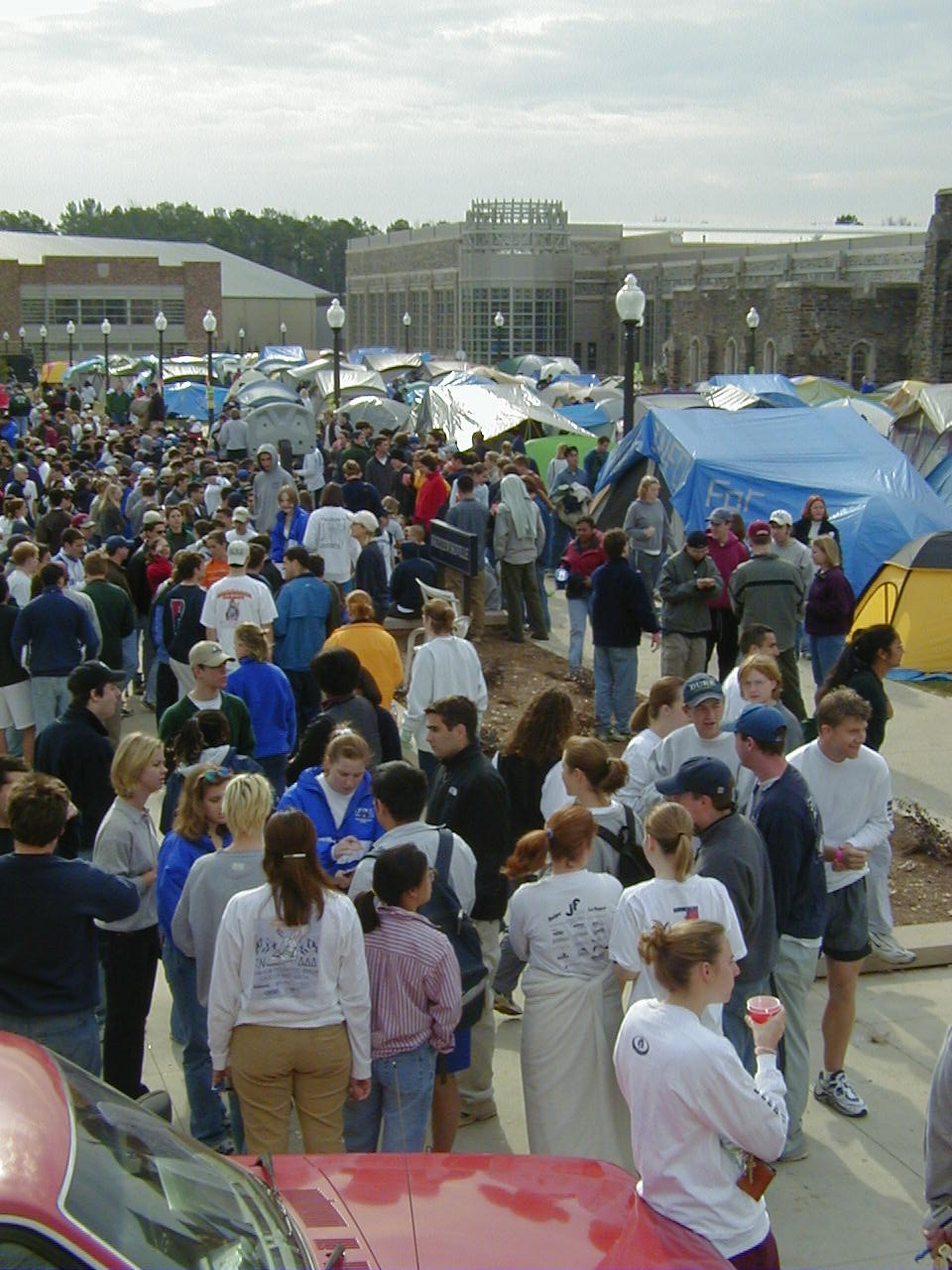
Cameron Crazies gathering in K-ville a few hours before the 2000 UNC vs Duke basketball game. By 2000, K-ville had been landscaped with a uniform lawn on which the tents could be pitched, and was being equipped with Wireless internet service.

The number of tenting games in a single season is determined by the Line Monitor Committee of the Duke Student Government. Tents are sometimes allowed for big games like the ACC-Big 10 challenge, but the rules for UNC game tenting only apply to that game. Three to eight weeks before the actual game (depending on whether the UNC game at Duke is in February or March), students begin to put up and live in tents outside Cameron Indoor Stadium. As many as twelve people can occupy a specific tent group. As regulated by Duke Student Government, there must be a certain number of students in the tent at regular, periodic checks.

The tenting season is divided into three sections. From the beginning of tenting in early January for the first third of the season, tents of 12 must have 2 people in the tent during the day and 10 people each night. For the next third of the season, tents must have 1 person in the tent during the day and 6 people each night. For the final third, before the game, tents still must have 1 person during the day but only 2 people each night. The two weekend nights prior to the game, or the weekend before the game, are personal check nights, during which each of the twelve tent members must be at the tent for 3 of 5 personal checks spread over the two nights. If a tent misses a tent check twice, it gets moved to the end of the line (assuming availability). If K-ville is at full capacity (100 tents) and a waitlist exists at the time of the second miss, the tent gets removed completely. "Grace" is given (i.e., tenters can leave K'ville) in the event of severe weather, if temperatures reach below 32 °F (0 °C), more than 2 inches (5.1 cm) snow falls, or if winds reach 35 miles per hour (56 km/h).

Tents must register with the line monitors (students in charge of overseeing and enforcing K-ville rules and regulations) prior to setting up. There are three types: Black registration, which is the longest and most intense option in which the use of actual tents was forbidden in the past. All 12 tenters used to sleep in K-ville during black tenting. Today, however, pre-fabricated tents are required throughout the tenting season and only 10 people must sleep in the tent. Black tenting groups participate in attendance events and trivia that determine their order in line. A tent that starts after the beginning of black tenting but during the period when 10 members are required to be in the tent at night is referred to as a "dirty black tent." Blue registration is the next period, in which a tent can register at any time before approximately two weeks prior to the game; after this, white registration goes into effect, which is significantly more complicated. A tent that does not start on the first day of blue tenting is typically referred to as a "dirty blue tent."

For blue registration, a tent group need only give their names to the line monitors and start tenting. However, for white registration, students must participate in the Race to the Secret Spots, where they meet the line monitors at locations on campus that are disclosed on a website and social media at a specified time; this results in a hectic dash to the locations once they are made public. The locations are given in riddle form, making it more difficult to identify the spot, even once the clues are made public. Most tenting groups station members around campus, and identify which members are closest to the spots once they are disclosed online. Hundreds of tent representatives usually appear at the White registration locations for the 30 remaining spots not taken by Black and Blue tenters, with the spots filling up in a matter of minutes. The 31st to 60th groups to complete the Race to the Secret Spots will receive flex tenting spots, where they are required to follow the rules of white tenting but are not guaranteed tickets. Flex tenting was preceded by the walk-up line, which formed 48 hours before tipoff. It consisted of couples, and one member of each couple was required to be in line at all times. People in the walk-up line were not guaranteed to get into the game; people who had waited more than 24 hours sometimes did not get in. The rigor and uncertainty of the walk-up line agitated students, which caused a near-riot before the 2018 UNC game. Flex tenting began in 2019.

K-ville is also a social function at Duke, as many students participate at least once. Duke has installed Wi-Fi service and Ethernet ports in the lightposts so that students can participate in tenting without falling behind in their schoolwork, although the internet is known to be very unreliable. Students also complain that the cold weather also prevents them from getting any real work done.

Heaters are not permitted in K-ville; students must keep warm by simply using sleeping bags and dressing appropriately, or creative use of shared bodily warmth.

== Robertson Scholars ==
In December 2006, the Duke Student Government banned Robertson Scholars from UNC (who attend Duke for one semester) from participating in tenting for the game versus UNC, although they can still get in via the walk-up line. Some feel this is a violation of the Robertson Scholars Program, which states that "they have full student privileges at both Duke and UNC-Chapel Hill. This includes access to courses; faculty and research opportunities; and arts, cultural, and sporting events." That tenting season, some Robertsons tented with some full-time Duke students, using their Duke ID cards to get into the game. However, once inside the student section the Robertson attendees removed Duke attire worn into the game to reveal UNC paraphernalia. To prevent this situation from happening again, Robertson Scholars visiting from UNC were banned from tenting in K-ville, starting in 2006.

== Popularity of K-ville ==
In January 2017, over 150 tent groups registered for black and blue tenting, exceeding the 70 tent cap. This was the first time in the history of K-ville that the 70 tent cap reserved for black and blue tenters was exceeded. The line monitors created a preliminary trivia test based on the current men's basketball season as a way to select the lucky 70 tents that would be allowed to tent. The tenting starting date was pushed back from Wednesday, January 11 to Thursday January 12 to accommodate the testing period. If a tent group did not make the top 70 they would be placed on a wait list in the order of their scores. If a tent among the first 70 dropped or got bumped, the next group on the waitlist would move up and become a blue tent. For the 2021-22 season, the tenting period was shortened due to COVID-19; nonetheless, almost one-third of Duke's undergraduate student body attended and competed in a trivia test at Cameron about the current Duke team (including players' statistics, pets' names, and details from their social media accounts). The top 70 scoring groups (each having 12 tenters) were awarded with spots in K'ville starting on January 23. These seventy tents were required to have six occupants all night and two during the day until Feb. 13, when another 30 tents entered K-ville, after the "race to the secret spot" scavenger hunt. On February 25, "P-checks" (personal checks) were held, requiring all tenters to be present in K-Ville for three tent checks throughout the night. P-checks are a big social event, with live music, food trucks, games, and partying. In 2024, one tent even hosted a Mariachi band. The tenters who passed P-Checks will be granted access to the March 5 game against UNC.

Tenting has become such an integral part of the undergraduate experience at Duke that many of the most notable tents in K-ville are passed down within student groups from year to year. Many of tents are named and elaborately decorated, and some of which were documented in a 2015/2016 video series published by the University called "K-Ville Kribs.". The oldest tent in K-ville, nicknamed "Das Boot", has been one of the most prominent tents in Krzyzewskiville since 2013.

== Player presence in K-ville ==
Over the past few years, current players on the Duke Men's Basketball team have begun to show a greater involvement with and appreciation of the tenters in K-Ville. For the 2013-14 season, Jabari Parker made homemade dessert bars, dubbed "Jabari Bars," and passed them out to tenters, and Andre Dawkins gave out fruit snacks to tenters on a different occasion. During the 2014-15 season, Marshall Plumlee gave tours of the most notable tents in K-Ville and interviewed tents' members in a mini video series called "K-Ville Kribs." In his last year on the Duke Men's Basketball team (2016–17) Amile Jefferson (now an assistant coach with the team) oversaw a half-court tournament played by current tenters, where the winning tent group got to be the first group for the final game of the season (Duke vs. Florida State University).

== See also ==
- Cameron Crazies
- Coach K
- Duke Blue Devils men's basketball
- Duke University
