= 2014–15 Duke Blue Devils men's basketball team =

American college basketball season

2014–15 Duke Blue Devils men's basketball

NCAA tournament National Champions Coaches vs. Cancer Classic champions

National Championship Game, W 68–63 vs. Wisconsin
- Conference: Atlantic Coast Conference

Ranking
- Coaches: No. 1
- AP: No. 4
- Record: 35–4 (15–3 ACC)
- Head coach: Mike Krzyzewski (35th season)
- Associate head coach: Jeff Capel
- Assistant coaches: Nate James; Jon Scheyer
- Captains: Quinn Cook; Amile Jefferson
- Home arena: Cameron Indoor Stadium

2014–15 ACC men's basketball standings
	Conf.				Overall
Team	W		L	PCT	W		L	PCT
No. 6 Virginia	16	–	2	.889	30	–	4	.882
No. 4 Duke	15	–	3	.833	35	–	4	.897
No. 8 Notre Dame †	14	–	4	.778	32	–	6	.842
No. 15 North Carolina	11	–	7	.611	26	–	12	.684
Miami (FL)	10	–	8	.556	25	–	13	.658
NC State	10	–	8	.556	22	–	14	.611
Syracuse	9	–	9	.500	18	–	13	.581
Clemson	8	–	10	.444	16	–	15	.516
Florida State	8	–	10	.444	17	–	16	.515
Pittsburgh	8	–	10	.444	19	–	15	.559
Wake Forest	5	–	13	.278	13	–	19	.406
Boston College	4	–	14	.222	13	–	19	.406
Georgia Tech	3	–	15	.167	12	–	19	.387
Virginia Tech	2	–	16	.111	11	–	22	.333
No. 17 Louisville*	0	–	6	.000	0	–	8	.000
† ACC tournament winner Rankings from AP poll *Louisville: 24 reg. season games, 4 postseason games vacated due to sanctions against the program; Disputed Record-(27-9)(12-6)

The 2014–15 Duke Blue Devils men's basketball team represented Duke University during the 2014–15 NCAA Division I men's basketball season as members of the Atlantic Coast Conference. The team played its home games in Durham, North Carolina at Cameron Indoor Stadium, celebrating the arena's 75th anniversary. Mike Krzyzewski led the team as head coach in his 35th season with the Blue Devils. During the season, Krzyzewski became the first head coach in Division I men's basketball history to win 1,000 games. On the court, the team featured All-ACC players Jahlil Okafor, Quinn Cook, and Tyus Jones, with Okafor being named ACC Player of the Year and National Freshman of the Year.

Duke began the season by winning its first 14 games, the seventh such start in school history. During this stretch, Duke won the 2014 Coaches vs. Cancer Classic, defeating Stanford in the championship game. In ACC play, the Blue Devils finished in 2nd place with a 15–3 conference record. They were ranked in the top five of the AP poll for the entire season.

The team reached the semifinals of the 2015 ACC tournament before losing to eventual champion Notre Dame. In the NCAA tournament, Duke earned the number 1 seed in the south region, playing its first two games in Charlotte, North Carolina before advancing to the regionals at NRG Stadium in Houston, Texas. By beating Gonzaga 66–52 in the regional final, Duke advanced to the Final Four at Lucas Oil Stadium in Indianapolis, Indiana. The win marked the 16th Final Four appearance in school history. In the National Championship game, the Blue Devils beat the Wisconsin Badgers 68–63, winning a fifth national championship for both Duke and Krzyzewski. Tyus Jones was the tournament's Most Outstanding Player.

== Off season ==
=== Departures ===
After the 2013–14 season, Duke lost four seniors and two underclassmen from the squad. The six players leaving the team accounted for over half of the team's scoring and nearly half of the rebounding during the previous year. Among the senior departures were Tyler Thornton, who started 25 games in his senior season, and Andre Dawkins, who was the last remaining member from the 2010 NCAA Championship team. The two underclassmen, Jabari Parker and Rodney Hood, declared for the 2014 NBA draft on consecutive days, and were both selected in the 1st round. Parker led the team in points, rebounds, and blocks, with Hood being the second leading scorer on the team.

In addition to the player departures, Duke also lost a member of the coaching staff. Associate head coach Steve Wojciechowski left the program to become the head coach of the Marquette Golden Eagles. To replace him, assistant coach Jeff Capel was promoted to associate head coach, and special assistant Jon Scheyer was promoted to assistant coach.

Name	Number	Pos.	Height	Weight	Year	Hometown	Notes
Andre Dawkins	34	SG	6'5"	215	Senior (redshirt)	Chesapeake, Virginia	Graduated
Todd Zafirovski	52	C	6'9"	245	Senior (redshirt)	Lake Forest, Illinois	Graduated
Josh Hairston	15	PF	6'8"	235	Senior	Fredericksburg, Virginia	Graduated
Tyler Thornton	3	PG	6'2"	190	Senior	Washington, D.C.	Graduated
Rodney Hood	5	SF	6'8"	215	Sophomore (redshirt)	Meridian, Mississippi	Declared for 2014 NBA draft
Jabari Parker	1	F	6'8"	235	Freshman	Chicago, Illinois	Declared for the 2014 NBA draft
Semi Ojeleye#	34	SF	6'8"	230	Sophomore	Ottawa, Kansas	Transferred to SMU
Rasheed Sulaimon#	14	SG	6'5"	195	Junior	Houston, Texas	Dismissed from team

# – Denotes departure that occurred during 2014–15 season

=== Class of 2014 signees ===
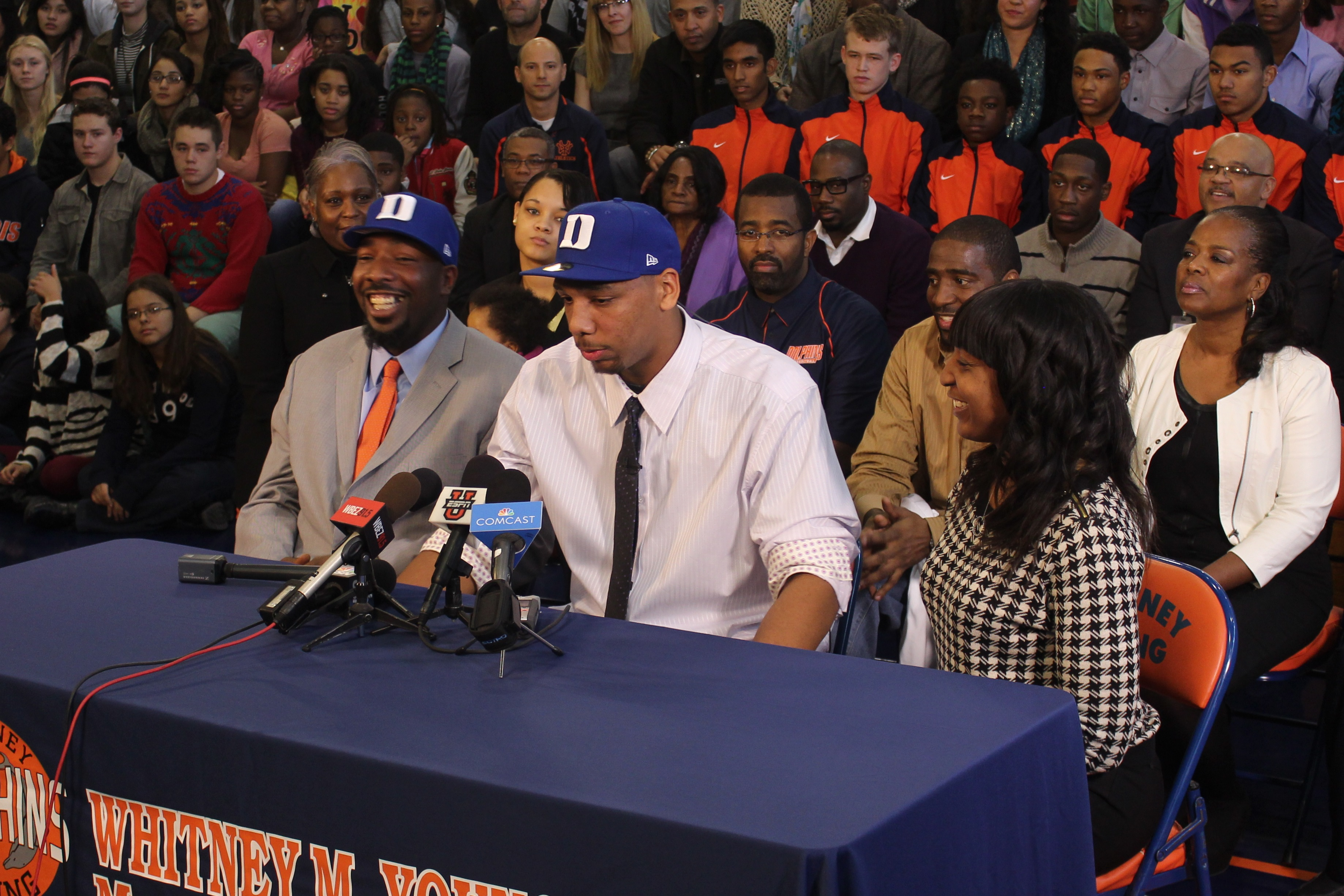
Jahlil Okafor during his commitment press conference

Duke brought in a recruiting class of four players to join the 2014–15 roster. Guard Grayson Allen was the first to commit, doing so soon after his junior season at Providence School. Throughout the summer of 2013, much of Duke's recruiting efforts were focused on point guard Tyus Jones and center Jahlil Okafor. Both were consensus top 10 recruits in the class of 2014, with Okafor being named the number one prospect by many major recruiting services. The pair had long been rumored to be planning on committing to the same college in spite of living hundreds of miles apart and the rarity of package deals coming to fruition. That November, the rumors were confirmed when the pair announced their decision during concurrent press conferences. Only a week later, 5-star small forward Justise Winslow announced that he would join the Blue Devils as well. Winslow's commitment gave Duke the number 1 recruiting class of 2014 according to the major recruiting services, the first school other than Kentucky to be ranked #1 in six years.

In the spring, all four players were named to the McDonald's All-America team, with Allen winning the dunk contest, Jones capturing the skills competition, and Okafor earning co-MVP honors for the game.

Over the summer of 2014, Duke also added Sean Obi, a transfer from Rice, though he would redshirt during the 2014–15 season due to NCAA rules.

Duke recruits at the 2014 McDonald's All-American Boys Game

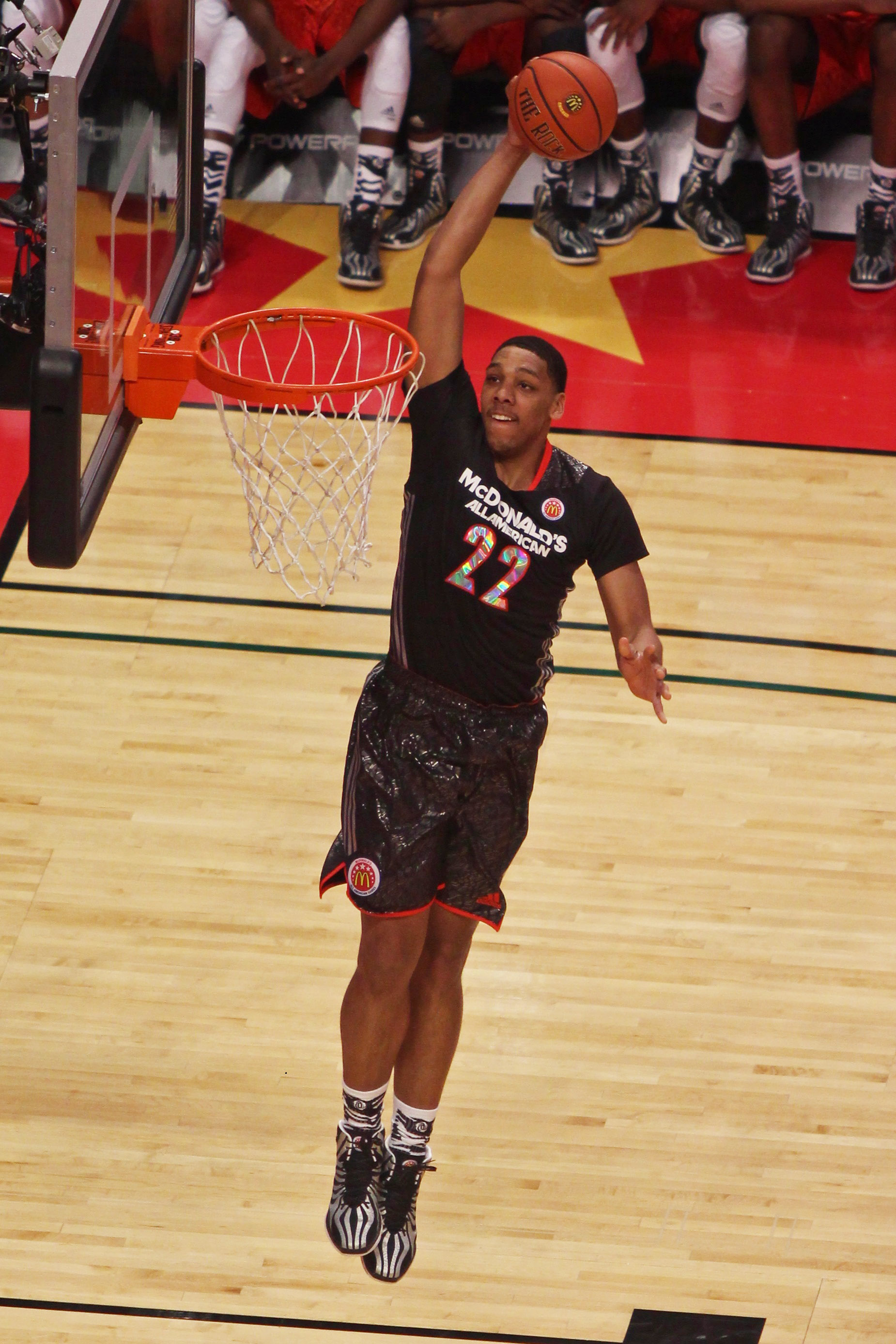
Jahlil Okafor

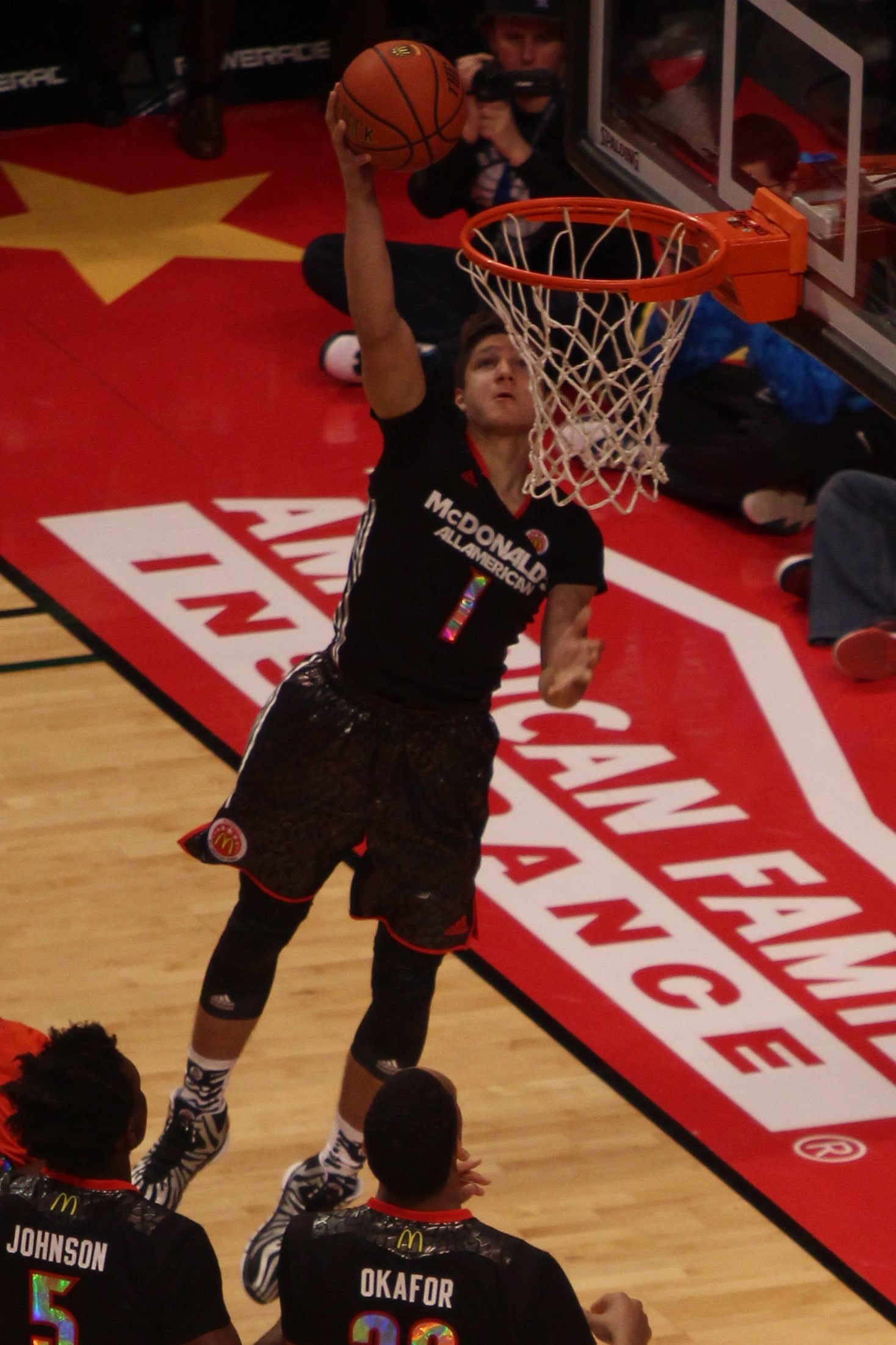
Grayson Allen

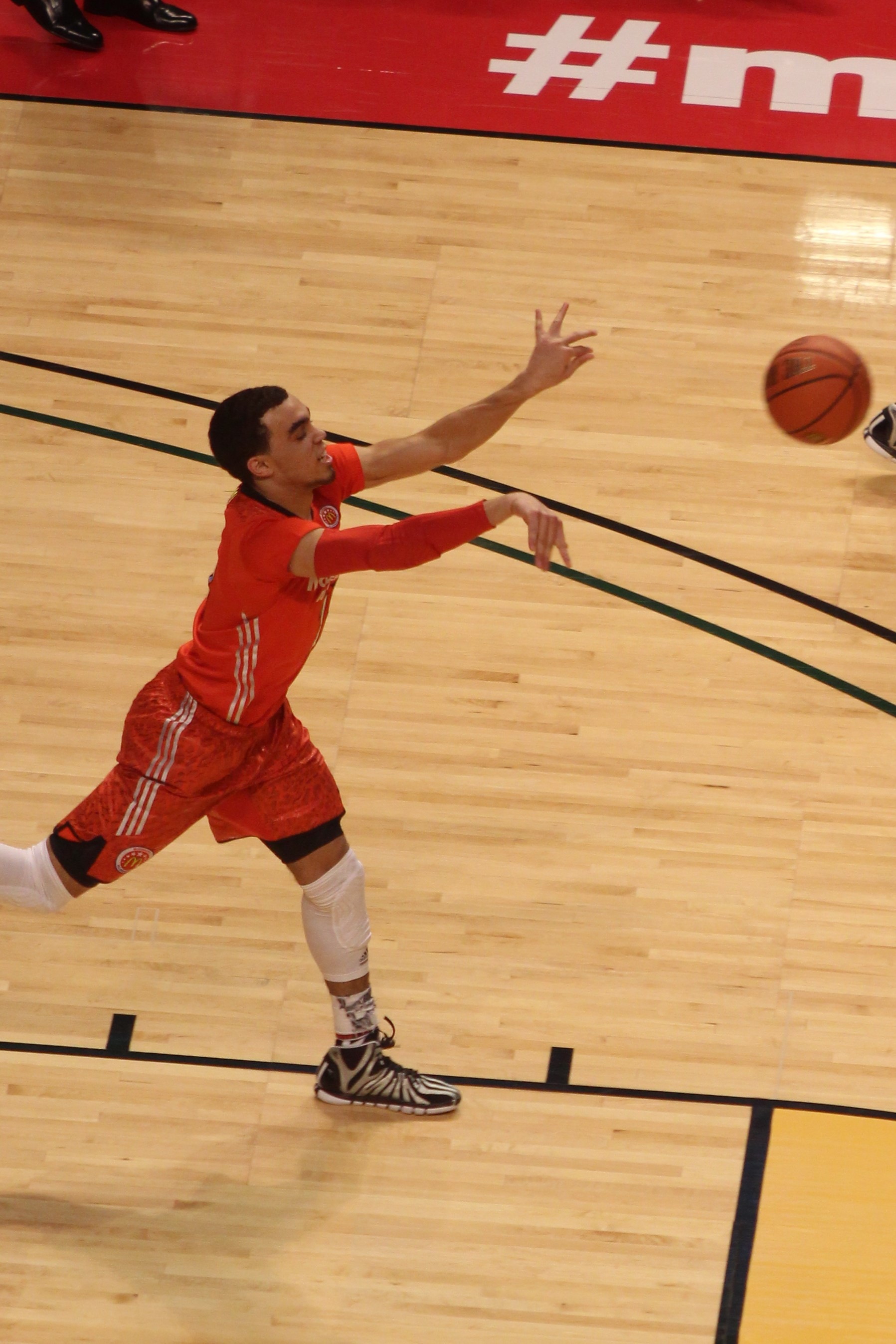
Tyus Jones

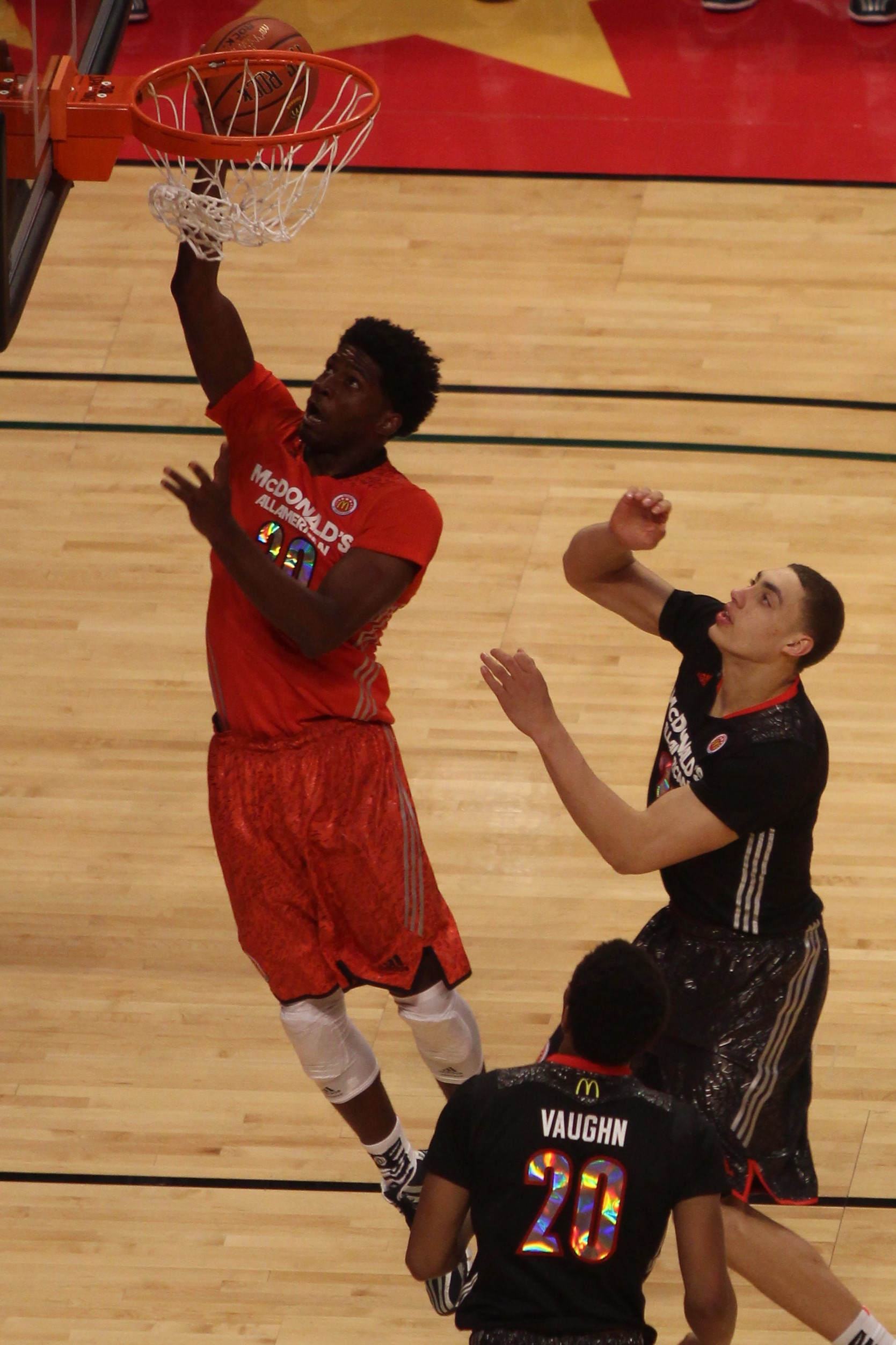
Justise Winslow

College recruiting
Name	Hometown	School	Height	Weight	Commit date
Grayson Allen; SG	Jacksonville, FL	Providence School	6 ft 5 in (1.96 m)	185 lb (84 kg)	Apr 24, 2013
Grayson Allen; SG	Recruit ratings: Scout: Rivals: 247Sports: ESPN:				
Jahlil Okafor; C	Chicago, IL	Whitney Young HS	6 ft 11 in (2.11 m)	270 lb (120 kg)	Nov 15, 2013
Jahlil Okafor; C	Recruit ratings: Scout: Rivals: 247Sports: ESPN:				
Tyus Jones; PG	Apple Valley, MN	Apple Valley HS	6 ft 1 in (1.85 m)	175 lb (79 kg)	Nov 15, 2013
Tyus Jones; PG	Recruit ratings: Scout: Rivals: 247Sports: ESPN:				
Justise Winslow; SF	Houston, TX	St. John's HS	6 ft 6 in (1.98 m)	215 lb (98 kg)	Nov 21, 2013
Justise Winslow; SF	Recruit ratings: Scout: Rivals: 247Sports: ESPN:				
Overall recruit ranking: Scout: #1 Rivals: #1 ESPN: #1
Note: In many cases, Scout, Rivals, 247Sports, On3, and ESPN may conflict in their listings of height and weight.; In these cases, the average was taken. ESPN grades are on a 100-point scale.; Sources: "Duke Basketball Commitment List". Rivals.; "2014 Duke Basketball Commits". Scout.; "ESPN". ESPN.; "Scout.com Team Recruiting Rankings". Scout.; "2014 Team Ranking". Rivals.

== Preseason ==
=== Expectations ===
Duke entered the 2014–15 season with high expectations. The combination of freshman talent and veteran leadership led many to put the Blue Devils on the early short list of Final Four contenders. Duke was named the favorite to win the ACC by the media at Operation Basketball, the league's annual media event. Nationally, Duke was ranked #4 and #3 in the preseason polls by the Associated Press and coaches respectively, earning two first-place votes in the coaches poll.

Expectations were just as high inside the program. After a disappointing early exit in the 2014 NCAA tournament, incoming freshman Tyus Jones sent a text message to Coach Krzyzewski saying, "this won't happen next year" in reference to the defeat. Senior guard Quinn Cook was preparing to cede his starting point guard role to Jones and transition to shooting guard, a position he had not played regularly in the past. Cook was quick to dismiss any speculation that Jones was coming in to replace him in the lineup, stating that his willingness to change positions was driven by his desire to win. Hanging a banner in Cameron Indoor Stadium, something that requires winning an ACC championship or reaching the Final Four, was a major goal for the team. Cook told the media, "I don’t feel like I’ve accomplished anything," referencing the fact that his previous teams had not raised any banners. Cook proved his work ethic over the summer, remaining in Durham the entire summer to work out. That hard work helped him earn the title of captain prior to the season along with junior Amile Jefferson. Jefferson had his own high expectations for the team, stating, "our guys have been preparing this summer to do something special."

=== Awards and watchlists ===
Aside from the team expectations, many individuals on the roster were highly praised during the preseason, none more so than freshman center Jahlil Okafor. In preseason interviews, teammates and coaches described Okafor's game as "dominant". The national media agreed with that assessment, with CBSSports.com and NBCSports.com naming him preseason player of the year. He was named to the preseason All-American team by most major media outlets, including the AP, USBWA and Sporting News. Within the ACC, he was named preseason freshman of the year, and was voted on to the preseason All-ACC team at Operation Basketball. Okafor was not the only player to receive high praise heading into the season. Fellow freshman Tyus Jones was named to preseason All-American second team by USA Today and third team by CBSSports.com.

Okafor and Jones, along with senior Quinn Cook and freshman Justise Winslow, were named to several watch lists for prestigious postseason awards. Duke's three star freshmen were named to the watch list for the Naismith Award, with Okafor and Jones tabbed to the Wooden Award watch list, while Okafor and Winslow were named to the Robertson Trophy watch list. All three freshmen made the Tisdale Award watch list, given to the national freshman of the year. Cook and Jones were tabbed for the Cousy Award watch list for best point guard in the nation.

== Roster ==
2014–15 Duke Blue Devils men's basketball team
Players
Coaches

Pos.	#	Name	Height	Weight	Year	Previous school	Hometown
PG	2	Quinn Cook (C)	6 ft 2 in (1.88 m)	185 lb (84 kg)	Sr	Oak Hill Academy	Bowie, Maryland
SG	3	Grayson Allen	6 ft 4 in (1.93 m)	195 lb (88 kg)	Fr	Providence School	Jacksonville, Florida
PG	5	Tyus Jones	6 ft 1 in (1.85 m)	190 lb (86 kg)	Fr	Apple Valley HS	Apple Valley, Minnesota
SF	12	Justise Winslow	6 ft 6 in (1.98 m)	225 lb (102 kg)	Fr	St. John's HS	Houston, Texas
SG	13	Matt Jones	6 ft 5 in (1.96 m)	210 lb (95 kg)	So	DeSoto HS	DeSoto, Texas
C	15	Jahlil Okafor	6 ft 11 in (2.11 m)	270 lb (122 kg)	Fr	Whitney Young HS	Chicago, Illinois
PF	21	Amile Jefferson (C)	6 ft 9 in (2.06 m)	215 lb (98 kg)	Jr	Friends Central School	Philadelphia, Pennsylvania
PF	34	Sean Obi (redshirt)	6 ft 9 in (2.06 m)	270 lb (122 kg)	So	Greens Farms Academy	Kaduna, Nigeria
C	40	Marshall Plumlee	7 ft 0 in (2.13 m)	255 lb (116 kg)	RS Jr	Christ School	Warsaw, Indiana
G	42	Sean Kelly (W)	6 ft 3 in (1.91 m)	195 lb (88 kg)	Sr	Ravenscroft School	Raleigh, North Carolina
G	45	Nick Pagliuca (W)	6 ft 3 in (1.91 m)	195 lb (88 kg)	So	Milton Academy	Weston, Massachusetts

Head coach

- Mike Krzyzewski

Assistant coach(es)

- Jeff Capel (assoc. HC)
- Nate James
- Jon Scheyer

Legend

- (C) Team captain
- (S) Suspended
- (I) Ineligible
- (W) Walk-on
- Injured
- Current redshirt

Roster
Last update: 05/03/2024

=== Semi Ojeleye transfer ===
On December 14, Duke announced that sophomore forward Semi Ojeleye would leave the program, granting him his full release. Coach Krzyzewski called him "an excellent student and a great representative of our school and basketball program." After a successful high school career, in which he was named the 2013 Parade National Player of the Year, he struggled to find playing time as a freshman, logging only 80 minutes. While he did see the court more as a sophomore, playing 63 minutes through Duke's first eight games of the year, the vast majority of that playing time came during blowouts at home. He only logged six combined minutes in Duke's four games away from Cameron, sitting out games against Stanford and Wisconsin entirely.

After announcing his transfer, he immediately drew interest from several high major programs. He did not spend much time choosing a program, deciding to join SMU and head coach Larry Brown less than two weeks after the initial announcement. His quick decision allowed him to enroll at SMU for the spring semester to begin his NCAA-mandated year in residence before becoming eligible for the spring semester in 2016.

=== Rasheed Sulaimon dismissal ===
On January 29, Duke announced that Rasheed Sulaimon had been dismissed from the program. The announcement came as a surprise, as there were few warning signs that his status with the team was in question. During his sophomore season, the coaching staff took issue with the way Sulaimon had handled adversity, going as far as benching him for an entire game against Michigan in late 2013. In his junior year, however, there were no outward signs that this was still the case, and he had not been the subject of any publicly disclosed discipline since that game. The only official explanation of the dismissal was a quote from Coach Krzyzewski in the press release stating that Sulaimon had failed to "consistently live up to the standards required to be a member of our program". Sulaimon was the first person to be dismissed from the team by Krzyzewski as head coach of Duke. It was also announced that Sulaimon remained a student at the university and was in good academic standing.

A month later, on March 2, the dismissal came under new scrutiny as Duke's student newspaper, The Chronicle, published accusations that two women had separately claimed that Sulaimon had sexually assaulted them. While the two alleged victims did not come forward directly, multiple participants in the retreats told The Chronicle that accusations were made at the retreats. Further accusations were made in the article claiming that the coaching staff, athletics department, and university administration knew of the allegations for a year prior to Sulaimon's dismissal, and had failed to act. The next day, athletic director Kevin White stated that all accusations of misconduct within the department are referred to the Office of Student Conduct, and that the entire coaching staff had fulfilled their responsibilities. White, and all other Duke faculty and staff declined to address Sulaimon specifically, however, citing FERPA. On March 5, it was revealed by Sulaimon's lawyer that he was not under investigation at the time, but an investigation by the Office of Student Conduct had taken place and been completed in 2014.

There was little new information in the following weeks in regards to the dismissal and allegations. Sports Illustrated reported that a number of events culminated in his dismissal, and the original Chronicle article on the allegations claimed that Duke's sports information director told the paper on the day of the dismissal that it was multiple actions rather than a single one that led to the dismissal.

On April 29, Sulaimon broke his silence in an interview with ESPN's Jeff Goodman. He confirmed that he had been interviewed by Duke's Office of Student Conduct during the winter of 2013–14 and again in September 2014, but that the investigation never progressed to a hearing. He also said that he was planning to graduate during the summer and transfer for his final year of eligibility. On May 11, it was announced that Sulaimon would transfer to Maryland to finish his collegiate career.

== Schedule and results ==
=== Exhibitions ===
The Blue Devils' season began on October 25 with Countdown to Craziness, Duke's version of Midnight Madness. The event featured a dunk contest, won by redshirt junior Marshall Plumlee, as well as an intra-squad scrimmage. Freshman Jahlil Okafor topped all scorers, tallying 27 points in the 24-minute scrimmage.

Duke's first game against outside competition came 10 days later against Livingstone College. The Blue Devils nearly doubled the score of the Blue Bears in a 115–58 victory. Seven of Duke's ten players scored in double figures while point guard Tyus Jones tallied 11 assists. Duke's final exhibition was played against Central Missouri, the defending Division II national champions. The game marked the sixth straight season in which Duke played an exhibition game against the reigning Division II champions. The Blue Devils struggled early, falling behind the Mules 13–7 early before taking control of the game, winning 87–47 behind 17 points from Justise Winslow.

=== Regular season ===
==== November ====
Duke hosted its first two games of the year as part of the 2015 Coaches vs. Cancer Classic. The first game, on November 14 against Presbyterian, saw Duke start three freshmen in a season opener for the first time in over 30 years. In spite of the youth, there were no early nerves as Duke raced out to a 38-point halftime lead en route to a 113–44 victory. The 69-point margin of victory was the third largest in Duke history. The next night, the team followed up the win with a 109–59 victory over Fairfield. By scoring over 100 points against the Stags, Duke started the season with consecutive 100-point games for the first time since 1991–92. During the game, Quinn Cook scored his 1,000th career point, becoming the 64th player in Duke history to achieve that mark.

In the Champions Classic, the Blue Devils travelled to Indianapolis for their first game of the year against a ranked opponent, #19 Michigan State. Duke's first game away from home proved to be a successful one as Duke scored on the inside and outside, leading the entire way in an 81–71 victory. On the inside, Jahlil Okafor showed off a variety of post moves on his way to 17 points, while on the outside, the team shot 50% from the three-point line. The win improved Duke's record in the event to 3–1, best of the four participating teams.

On November 21 and 22, Duke continued its road trip, visiting the Barclays Center in Brooklyn for the championship rounds of the Coaches vs. Cancer Classic. In the semifinals, Duke played Temple, with the defense leading the way in a 74–54 victory. Duke held the Owls to just 37 percent shooting for the game, while also forcing 17 turnovers. In the finals, Duke met Stanford, led by former Blue Devil Johnny Dawkins. It was the first time Dawkins and Coach K had faced off against each other as head coaches. Defense was once again a big factor as Duke held Stanford to 36 percent from the field on its way to winning the championship by a score of 70–59. Quinn Cook scored 18 points to earn tournament MVP honors, while Jahlil Okafor and Justise Winslow also made the all-tournament team.

Duke returned home for two games to close out the month. First, Duke cruised to an easy 93–54 win over the Furman Paladins on November 26. The Blue Devils then faced Coach K's former squad, the Army Black Knights, on November 30. Army proved to be a tougher test, pulling within single digits of Duke early in the second half, but Duke pulled away from there, winning 93–73. Overall, Duke finished the month with a 7–0 record, trailing for just 48 seconds combined in those games.

==== December ====
On December 3, Duke travelled to Madison, Wisconsin for the ACC–Big Ten Challenge in what would be its toughest test to date, #2 Wisconsin in the Kohl Center. With preseason all-Americans Jahlil Okafor and Frank Kaminsky squaring off in the post, the game was billed as the marquee matchup of the challenge and a potential Final Four preview. The game lived up to the hype, with Duke leading most of the way behind a 22-point effort from Tyus Jones. Wisconsin was able to stay close, however, with major contributions from Kaminsky and Traevon Jackson. In the end, Duke's offense was the difference, shooting over 65 percent from the field in the 80–70 Duke win. It was the first time in the history of the Kohl Center that a visiting team shot over 60 percent from the field. The win helped Duke climb to #2 in the polls, while Jones' performance earned him National Freshman of the Week honors.

The Blue Devils would not play again for 12 days due to final exams, with their next contest on December 15 against Elon. The team struggled, committing 17 turnovers in the game and allowing Elon to close within 12 points in the middle of the second half. The team was able to hold off Elon 75–62 largely due to the efforts of Jahlil Okafor. He scored 25 points and grabbed 20 rebounds in the game, becoming the first Duke player since Elton Brand to post 20 and 20 in a game. His performance earned him recognition as the Wayman Tisdale national freshman of the week. Three days later, Duke traveled to New Jersey for a game against the defending National Champion UConn Huskies at the IZOD Center. Despite entering the game with only a 4–3 record, UConn proved to be a formidable opponent, holding the Blue Devils to 37.5% shooting and tying the game early in the second half. Duke was once again able to pull away, however, winning 66–56.

Duke closed out the calendar year at home with wins over Toledo and Wofford, finishing December with a 12–0 record and maintaining their #2 ranking in the polls.

==== January ====
Duke's first game of the new year was also the start of conference play, but the Devils continued their stellar play from December with an 85–62 victory over Boston College. The game featured another big performance from Okafor, scoring 28 points in the game, shooting 14–17 from the foul line, a surprising number given that Okafor was normally about a 50 percent foul shooter. Duke's next game against Wake Forest proved to be the first real chink in the armor for the team. In Duke's first 13 games, the team only trailed for just over 6 minutes combined. In the Wake Forest game, they trailed for over 5 minutes, including a late deficit with just 6 minutes left in the game. Duke would eventually hold on to win 73–65, but the game ended the Blue Devils streak of double-digit wins at 13.

Duke's struggles would only get worse over the next two games, especially at the defensive end of the floor. Duke's 14 game winning streak to start the year came to an end on January 11 in Raleigh against NC State. The Wolfpack shot over 60% from 3-point range on their way to an 87–75 win. Duke's defensive woes would carry over to their next game against Miami, with the Hurricanes shooting 18–27 in the second half in a 90–74 win at Cameron Indoor Stadium. It was Duke's first loss at home since 2012, breaking a 41-game home winning streak. After the game, Coach K said that he felt that something had been missing with the team since Christmas.

The Blue Devils would not have much time to figure out what was missing, as their next game saw the team travel to #6 Louisville. Duke not only had to navigate the prospect of its first 3-game losing streak since 2007, but also a top ten opponent anticipating their first match-up with the Blue Devils as members of the ACC. In response to the struggling defense from the previous 2 games, Coach Krzyzewski employed a surprising tactic for the game, a zone defense. While Duke had not been known for playing much zone under Coach K, the strategy worked, as the Cardinals shot a mere 4–25 from behind the 3 point line. With the offense being paced by Amile Jefferson, who scored a career-high 19 points to go along with 7 rebounds, the Devils earned a 63–52 win on the road.

After returning home for a 79–65 win over Pitt, the Blue Devils embarked on a 3-game road trip to end the month. First up was a trip to New York to face St. John's in Coach Krzyzewski's first attempt to reach 1,000 wins for his career. After a fast start for the Blue Devils, the Red Storm took control of the game, building a 10-point lead in the second half. Sparked by a game-high 22 points from Tyus Jones, along with 17 each for Jahlil Okafor and Quinn Cook, Duke was able to comeback and win by a score of 77–68. The road trip continued to Indiana, where the Blue Devils faced #8 Notre Dame, led by former Duke assistant Mike Brey. Sparked by a double-double from Jerian Grant, the Irish were to defeat the Devils by a score of 77–73. The final game of the road trip pitted Duke against #2 Virginia, who entered the game undefeated. The match-up was also featured on ESPN's College Gameday, the first time the program had ever aired from Virginia's campus. Duke struggled shooting the ball for much of the game, missing on their first 9 3-point attempts to allow Virginia to build an 11-point lead in the middle of the second half. Duke found its offense in the final eight minutes of the game, however, scoring 28 points in just 11 possessions during that span to cap off a 69–63 win.

==== February ====
Duke returned home for two games to begin February. In a match up with Georgia Tech, the Blue Devils struggled to a narrow 72–66 victory. Despite leading the entire second half, Duke needed some late free throws from Quinn Cook, part of a 17-point second half performance, to seal the game. With the win, Coach Krzyzewski set the record for most ACC wins, with 423. The next game was a rematch from just 10 days earlier against Notre Dame. The Blue Devils were able to flip the result of the previous loss in South Bend, using an early 43–7 run to win in a rout, 90–60. The loss was the biggest margin of defeat for Notre Dame since 1999.

=== Results ===
Date time, TV	Rank^{#}	Opponent^{#}	Result	Record	High points	High rebounds	High assists	Site (attendance) city, state
Exhibition
November 4*; 7:00 pm	No. 4	Livingstone	W 115–58		19 – Winslow	8 – Tied	11 – T. Jones	Cameron Indoor Stadium (9,314); Durham, NC
Nov 8*; 1:00 pm	No. 4	Central Missouri	W 87–47		17 – Winslow	9 – Okafor	6 – T. Jones	Cameron Indoor Stadium (9,314); Durham, NC
Regular season
Nov 14*; 6:00 pm, ESPNU	No. 4	Presbyterian; Coaches vs. Cancer Classic	W 113–44	1–0	19 – Okafor	10 – Jefferson	7 – T. Jones	Cameron Indoor Stadium (9,314); Durham, NC
Nov 15*; 8:00 pm, ESPN3	No. 4	Fairfield; Coaches vs. Cancer Classic	W 109–59	2–0	18 – Winslow	9 – Tied	5 – T. Jones	Cameron Indoor Stadium (9,314); Durham, NC
Nov 18*; 7:00 pm, ESPN	No. 4	vs. No. 19 Michigan State; Champions Classic	W 81–71	3–0	19 – Cook	6 – Winslow	6 – Cook	Bankers Life Fieldhouse (19,306); Indianapolis, IN
Nov 21*; 9:30 pm, TruTV	No. 4	vs. Temple; Coaches vs. Cancer Classic semifinals	W 74–54	4–0	17 – Cook	8 – Tied	7 – T. Jones	Barclays Center (10,135); Brooklyn, NY
Nov 22*; 9:30 pm, TruTV	No. 4	vs. Stanford; Coaches vs. Cancer Classic championship	W 70–59	5–0	18 – Cook	12 – Okafor	5 – Cook	Barclays Center (10,046); Brooklyn, NY
Nov 26*; 5:00 pm, ESPNU	No. 4	Furman	W 93–54	6–0	24 – Okafor	12 – Jefferson	7 – T. Jones	Cameron Indoor Stadium (9,314); Durham, NC
Nov 30*; Noon, ESPNU	No. 4	Army	W 93–73	7–0	21 – Okafor	12 – Jefferson	10 – T. Jones	Cameron Indoor Stadium (9,314); Durham, NC
Dec 3*; 9:30 pm, ESPN	No. 4	at No. 2 Wisconsin; ACC–Big Ten Challenge	W 80–70	8–0	22 – T. Jones	6 – Tied	4 – T. Jones	Kohl Center (17,279); Madison, WI
Dec 15*; 7:00 pm, ESPNU	No. 2	Elon	W 75–62	9–0	25 – Okafor	20 – Okafor	4 – Tied	Cameron Indoor Stadium (9,314); Durham, NC
Dec 18*; 8:00 pm, ESPN	No. 2	vs. UConn; Izod Center Showcase	W 66–56	10–0	21 – T. Jones	13 – Jefferson	3 – T. Jones	Izod Center (16,541); East Rutherford, NJ
Dec 29*; 7:00 pm, ESPN2	No. 2	Toledo	W 86–69	11–0	27 – Okafor	8 – Tied	8 – T. Jones	Cameron Indoor Stadium (9,314); Durham, NC
Dec 31*; 3:00 pm, RSN	No. 2	Wofford	W 84–55	12–0	24 – Okafor	8 – Okafor	5 – T. Jones	Cameron Indoor Stadium (9,314); Durham, NC
Jan 3; 4:00 pm, RSN	No. 2	Boston College	W 85–62	13–0 (1–0)	28 – Okafor	8 – Okafor	4 – Winslow	Cameron Indoor Stadium (9,314); Durham, NC
Jan 7; 9:00 pm, ACCN	No. 2	at Wake Forest	W 73–65	14–0 (2–0)	20 – Winslow	11 – Okafor	4 – T. Jones	LJVM Coliseum (12,651); Winston-Salem, NC
Jan 11; 1:30 pm, CBS	No. 2	at NC State	L 75–87	14–1 (2–1)	23 – Okafor	12 – Okafor	4 – T. Jones	PNC Arena (19,500); Raleigh, NC
Jan 13; 9:00 pm, ESPNU	No. 4	Miami (FL)	L 74–90	14–2 (2–2)	18 – Cook	15 – Okafor	4 – Cook	Cameron Indoor Stadium (9,314); Durham, NC
Jan 17; Noon, ESPN	No. 4	at No. 6 Louisville	W 63–52	15–2 (3–2)	19 – Jefferson	7 – Tied	8 – T. Jones	KFC Yum! Center (22,791); Louisville, KY
Jan 19; 7:00 pm, ESPN	No. 5	Pittsburgh	W 79–65	16–2 (4–2)	22 – T. Jones	10 – Cook	5 – Okafor	Cameron Indoor Stadium (9,314); Durham, NC
Jan 25*; 2:00 pm, FOX	No. 5	at St. John's	W 77–68	17–2	22 – T. Jones	10 – Okafor	6 – T. Jones	Madison Square Garden (19,812); New York City, NY
Jan 28; 7:30 pm, ESPN2	No. 4	at No. 8 Notre Dame	L 73–77	17–3 (4–3)	22 – Okafor	17 – Okafor	4 – M. Jones	Edmund P. Joyce Center (9,149); South Bend, IN
Jan 31; 7:00 pm, ESPN	No. 4	at No. 2 Virginia; ESPN College GameDay	W 69–63	18–3 (5–3)	17 – T. Jones	11 – Winslow	3 – Tied	John Paul Jones Arena (14,593); Charlottesville, VA
Feb 4; 7:00 pm, ESPN2	No. 4	Georgia Tech	W 72–66	19–3 (6–3)	17 – Cook	10 – Winslow	5 – T. Jones	Cameron Indoor Stadium (9,314); Durham, NC
Feb 7; 1:00 pm, CBS	No. 4	No. 10 Notre Dame	W 90–60	20–3 (7–3)	20 – Okafor	11 – Winslow	7 – T. Jones	Cameron Indoor Stadium (9,314); Durham, NC
Feb 9; 7:00 pm, ESPN	No. 4	at Florida State	W 73–70	21–3 (8–3)	26 – Cook	6 – Jones	12 – Jones	Donald L. Tucker Center (11,498); Tallahassee, FL
Feb 14; 6:00 pm, ESPN	No. 4	at Syracuse	W 80–72	22–3 (9–3)	23 – Okafor	13 – Okafor	6 – T. Jones	Carrier Dome (35,446); Syracuse, NY
Feb 18; 9:00 pm, ESPN	No. 4	No. 15 North Carolina; Rivalry	W 92–90 ^{OT}	23–3 (10–3)	22 – Tied	13 – Okafor	7 – T. Jones	Cameron Indoor Stadium (9,314); Durham, NC
Feb 21; 4:00 pm, ESPN	No. 4	Clemson	W 78–56	24–3 (11–3)	27 – Cook	13 – Winslow	9 – T. Jones	Cameron Indoor Stadium (9,314); Durham, NC
Feb 25; 9:00 pm, ESPN2	No. 4	at Virginia Tech	W 91–86 ^{OT}	25–3 (12–3)	30 – Okafor	9 – Okafor	9 – T. Jones	Cassell Coliseum (5,346); Blacksburg, VA
Feb 28; 7:00 pm, ESPN	No. 4	Syracuse	W 73–54	26–3 (13–3)	23 – Winslow	14 – Okafor	6 – T. Jones	Cameron Indoor Stadium (9,314); Durham, NC
Mar 4; 8:00 pm, ACCN	No. 3	Wake Forest	W 94–51	27–3 (14–3)	27 – Allen	6 – Winslow	7 – Winslow	Cameron Indoor Stadium (9,314); Durham, NC
Mar 7; 9:00 pm, ESPN	No. 3	at No. 19 North Carolina; Rivalry and ESPN College GameDay	W 84–77	28–3 (15–3)	24 – Jones	6 – Tied	7 – Jones	Dean Smith Center (21,750); Chapel Hill, NC
ACC Tournament
Mar 12; 7:00 pm, ESPN	No. 2	vs. NC State; Quarterfinals	W 77–53	29–3	15 – Cook	6 – Winslow	8 – Jones	Greensboro Coliseum (22,026); Greensboro, NC
Mar 13; 9:00 pm, ESPN	No. 2	vs. No. 11 Notre Dame; Semifinals	L 64–74	29–4	28 – Okafor	11 – Winslow	5 – Jones	Greensboro Coliseum (22,026); Greensboro, NC
NCAA tournament
Mar 20*; 7:10 pm, CBS	(1 S) No. 4	vs. (16 S) Robert Morris; Second round	W 85–56	30–4	22 – Cook	11 – Winslow	7 – Tied	Time Warner Cable Arena (16,945); Charlotte, NC
Mar 22*; 2:40 pm, CBS	(1 S) No. 4	vs. (8 S) San Diego State; Third round	W 68–49	31–4	26 – Okafor	12 – Winslow	6 – T. Jones	Time Warner Cable Arena (18,482); Charlotte, NC
Mar 27*; 9:45 pm, CBS	(1 S) No. 4	vs. (5 S) No. 19 Utah; Sweet Sixteen	W 63–57	32–4	21 – Winslow	10 – Winslow	3 – Jones	NRG Stadium (21,168); Houston, TX
Mar 29*; 5:05 pm, CBS	(1 S) No. 4	vs. (2 S) No. 7 Gonzaga; Elite Eight	W 66–52	33–4	16 – Tied	8 – Okafor	6 – Jones	NRG Stadium (20,744); Houston, TX
Apr 4*; 6:09 pm, TBS	(1 S) No. 4	vs. (7 E) No. 23 Michigan State; Final Four	W 81–61	34–4	19 – Winslow	9 – Winslow	4 – Jones	Lucas Oil Stadium (72,238); Indianapolis, IN
Apr 6*; 9:30 pm, CBS	(1 S) No. 4	vs. (1 W) No. 3 Wisconsin; National Championship	W 68–63	35–4	23 – T. Jones	9 – Winslow	2 – Tied	Lucas Oil Stadium (71,149); Indianapolis, IN
*Non-conference game. ^{#}Rankings from AP Poll. (#) Tournament seedings in parentheses. S=South Region, E=East Region, W=West Region. All times are in Eastern Time.

== Rankings ==
Ranking movement Legend: ██ Increase in ranking. ██ Decrease in ranking. ██ Not ranked the previous week.
Poll	Pre	Wk 2	Wk 3	Wk 4	Wk 5	Wk 6	Wk 7	Wk 8	Wk 9	Wk 10	Wk 11	Wk 12	Wk 13	Wk 14	Wk 15	Wk 16	Wk 17	Wk 18	Post	Final
AP	4	4	4	4	2	2	2	2	2	4	5	4	4	4	4	4	3	2	4	*N/A
Coaches	3	3	2	2	2	2	2	2	2	4	6	4	5	5	5	5	3	2	5	1

*AP does not release post-NCAA tournament rankings.

== Awards ==
=== In-season ===
	ACC Player of the Week			ACC Freshman of the Week	
Date	Name	Class	Position	Name	Position
November 17, 2014				Jahlil Okafor	C
November 24, 2014				Jahlil Okafor	C
December 1, 2014				Jahlil Okafor	C
December 8, 2014				Tyus Jones	PG
December 22, 2014				Jahlil Okafor	C
January 5, 2015	Jahlil Okafor	Fr.	C	Jahlil Okafor	C
January 12, 2015				Jahlil Okafor	C
January 19, 2015				Jahlil Okafor	C
January 26, 2015				Tyus Jones‡	PG
February 2, 2015				Jahlil Okafor	C
February 9, 2015				Justise Winslow	SF
February 16, 2015	Quinn Cook	Sr.	PG		
February 23, 2015	Quinn Cook	Sr.	PG	Tyus Jones	PG
March 8, 2015				Tyus Jones	PG

‡ – Award shared with Xavier Rathan-Mayes

=== Postseason ===
All-Americans

- Jahlil Okafor – 1st Team (AP, NABC, USBWA, Sporting News, Wooden (Note: The Wooden All-American team is a single 10 person team composed of all Wooden Award finalists.))
- Quinn Cook – 2nd Team (Sporting News), Honorable Mention (AP)
- Tyus Jones – Honorable Mention (AP)

Wayman Tisdale Award (National Freshman of the Year)

- Jahlil Okafor

Pete Newell Big Man Award

- Jahlil Okafor

ACC Player of the Year

- Jahlil Okafor

ACC Rookie of the Year

- Jahlil Okafor

All-ACC Team

- Jahlil Okafor – 1st Team (Note: Okafor was a unanimous first team selection.)
- Quinn Cook – 2nd Team
- Tyus Jones – 3rd Team
- Justise Winslow – Honorable Mention

NCAA Tournament Most Outstanding Player

- Tyus Jones

NCAA Final Four All-Tournament Team

- Tyus Jones
- Grayson Allen
- Justise Winslow

NCAA South Regional Most Outstanding Player

- Tyus Jones

NCAA South Regional All-Tournament Team

- Tyus Jones
- Matt Jones
- Justise Winslow

All-ACC Academic Team

- Grayson Allen
- Amile Jefferson
- Tyus Jones
- Marshall Plumlee
- Justise Winslow

Winged Foot Award

- Mike Krzyzewski
