= 2015 NCAA Division I men's basketball championship game =

American college basketball final

National championship game
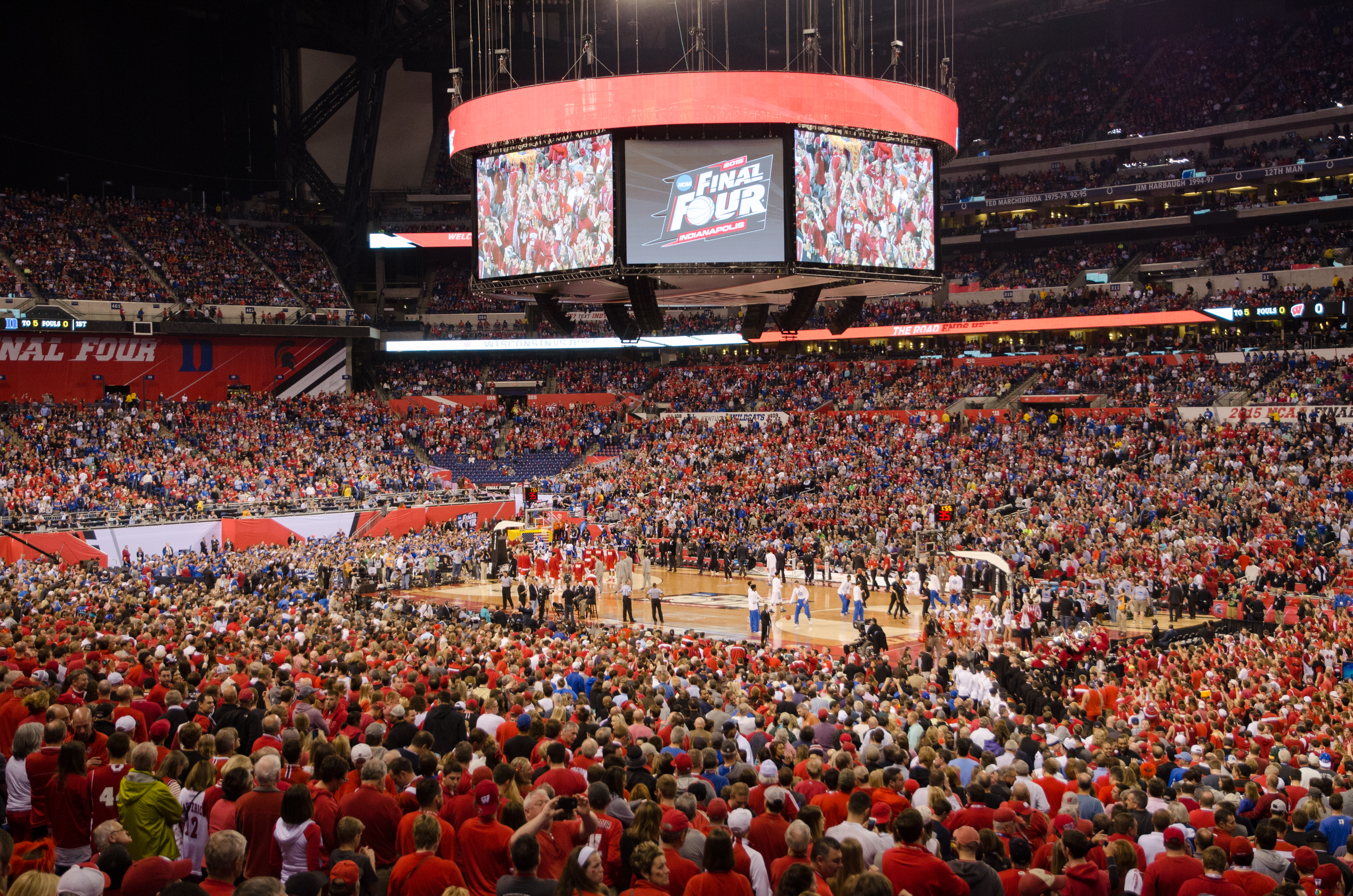
- Lucas Oil Stadium during the championship game between the Wisconsin Badgers and the Duke Blue Devils.
Wisconsin Badgers	Duke Blue Devils
Big Ten	ACC
(36–3)	(34–4)
63	68
Head coach: Bo Ryan	Head coach: Mike Krzyzewski
- AP: 3
- Coaches: 3
- AP: 4
- Coaches: 5
	1st half	2nd half	Total
Wisconsin Badgers	31	32	63
Duke Blue Devils	31	37	68
- Date: April 6, 2015
- Venue: Lucas Oil Stadium, Indianapolis, Indiana
- MVP: Tyus Jones, Duke
- Favorite: Wisconsin by 1
- Referees: Joe DeRosa, Michael Stephens, and Pat Driscoll
- Attendance: 71,149
- National anthem: United States Army Herald Trumpets

United States TV coverage
- Network: CBS
- Announcers: Jim Nantz (play-by-play); Bill Raftery and Grant Hill (color); Tracy Wolfson (sideline)
- Nielsen Ratings: 17.1 (28.3 million)

The 2015 NCAA Division I men's basketball championship game was the final game of the 2015 NCAA Division I men's basketball tournament, determining the national champion for the 2014–15 NCAA Division I men's basketball season. The game was played on April 6, 2015, at Lucas Oil Stadium in Indianapolis, Indiana, between the South regional champion, first-seeded Duke and the West regional champion, first-seeded Wisconsin.

Duke narrowly prevailed against the Badgers to win their second national title in six years and their fifth overall. As of 2026, this is the last time Duke or Wisconsin have appeared in the national championship game.

== Overview ==
The 2015 NCAA Men's Division I Basketball Championship Game was played on April 6, 2015, at Lucas Oil Stadium in Indianapolis, Indiana. It featured the South regional champion, the first-seeded Duke Blue Devils, and the West regional champion, the first-seeded Wisconsin Badgers. This marked the first time since 2008 that the national title game was played between two #1 seeded teams. That year, Kansas defeated Memphis 75–68 in overtime. (Memphis' participation in the tournament was later officially vacated.)

Duke head coach Mike Krzyzewski made his ninth title game appearance and was seeking his fifth Division I Championship. Wisconsin head coach Bo Ryan made his first Division I Championship Game appearance. He previously won four Division III titles with UW–Platteville.

The game was the first championship game appearance for the Badgers since winning the 1941 Championship in Kansas City. The Blue Devils last made the Finals in 2010, which they won in Indianapolis. Early in the 2014–15 season, Duke played Wisconsin in the 2014 ACC–Big Ten Challenge. Duke won the game 80–70 in a battle of big men between Duke's Jahlil Okafor and Wisconsin's Frank Kaminsky.

== Participants ==
=== Wisconsin Badgers ===
After a 28–3 regular season, Wisconsin beat Michigan, Purdue, and Michigan State en route to the Big Ten tournament championship. They were rewarded with the top seed in the West Regional of the NCAA Tournament.

Frank Kaminsky's double-double with 27 points and 12 rebounds, Sam Dekker's 20 points and Nigel Hayes' 15 points helped Wisconsin beat 16th seeded Coastal Carolina 86–72 in the second round (i.e., round of 64) of the NCAA Tournament. In the third round (i.e., round of 32), Dekker's 17 points and Kaminsky's 16 points helped Wisconsin pull away from 8th seeded Oregon for a 72–65 victory to advance to the Sweet 16 (i.e., the West regional semifinals). In the Sweet 16, Wisconsin used a 19–7 run to come back from a 53–46 deficit with 11 minutes remaining and take a 65–60 lead with five minutes remaining. Wisconsin used late free throws to deny 4th seeded North Carolina's upset bid and earn a 79–72 victory. They were led by Dekker's career high 23 points and 10 rebounds, and 19 points from Kaminsky.

In the Elite Eight (i.e., West regional final), 29 points from Kaminsky and another career-high 27 points from Dekker helped Wisconsin defeat 2nd seeded Arizona 85–78 in a rematch of the previous year's West regional finals. Wisconsin thus reached the Final Four in consecutive years for the first time in school history. In the Final Four, Kaminsky's second double-double of the tournament (20 points and 11 rebounds) helped Wisconsin end the overall number one seeded Kentucky's perfect season with a 71–64 victory, clinching their first appearance in the National Championship game since 1941. Kentucky had started the season 38–0, the best start in NCAA history.

Wisconsin defeated a #16, #8, #4, #2, and #1 seed — the predicted possible seeds in each round — en route to the championship game. They were the second team to accomplish this feat, the other being the 2001–02 Maryland Terrapins, who won the 2002 NCAA tournament.

=== Duke Blue Devils ===
After a 28–3 regular season, Duke beat North Carolina State in the ACC tournament before losing to Notre Dame in the semifinals. Despite the loss, Duke was selected as the top seed in the South regional as an at-large.

In the second round (i.e., round of 64) of the NCAA Tournament, Duke defeated 16th seeded Robert Morris 85–56. Quinn Cook scored 22 points and Jahlil Okafor added 21. In the third round (i.e., round of 32), Duke beat San Diego State 68–49 behind 26 points by Okafor to reach the Sweet 16 (i.e., the South regional semifinals). Duke next faced off with 5th seeded Utah. A strong defensive performance limited Utah, the top three-point field goal shooting team in the Pac-12, to four-for-16 (25 percent) on three-point field goal attempts and 57 points overall. Okafor struggled against Utah's double teams, but Duke pulled away in the final minutes for a 63–57 win. Justise Winslow had a double-double, with 21 points and 10 rebounds for Duke. In the Elite Eight (i.e., the South regional final), Duke had another strong defensive performance, limiting 2nd seeded Gonzaga to two-for-10 (20 percent) on three-point field goal attempts. Point guard Tyus Jones earned six assists while committing 0 turnovers, and repeatedly scored in the lane as Duke pulled away from a 66–52 victory. Okafor, Winslow, Jones combined for 38 points. Jones earned regional Most Valuable Player (MVP) honors, as he averaged 15 points and 4.5 assists.

In the Final Four, Duke played 7th seeded Michigan State, surprise winners of the East regional. The Spartans jumped out to a 14–6 lead, before Duke went on a 14–2 run in which Okafor scored seven points. Michigan State went on to miss 17 of their final 20 shots, and trailed 36–25 at halftime. Duke started the second half with an 18–9 run, and the game was never very close after that. The final score was 81–61. Justise Winslow led Duke with 19 points and 9 rebounds, Okafor scored 18 points, while grabbing 6 rebounds, and Quinn Cook added 17 points for Duke. Denzel Valentine scored 22 points and grabbed 11 rebounds to lead Michigan State.

== Starting lineups ==
Wisconsin	Position		Duke
Josh Gasser	G		Tyus Jones
Bronson Koenig	G		Quinn Cook
Nigel Hayes	F		Matt Jones
Sam Dekker	F		Justise Winslow
† Frank Kaminsky	F	C	† Jahlil Okafor
† 2015 Consensus First Team All-American

== Game summary ==
CBS

April 6, 2015
9:18 pm EDT

Box Score

#W1 Wisconsin Badgers 63, #S1 Duke Blue Devils 68
Scoring by half: 31–31, 32–37
Pts: F. Kaminsky III - 21; Rebs: F. Kaminsky - 12; Asts: Bronson Koenig - 4	Pts: Tyus Jones - 23; Rebs: Justise Winslow - 9 Asts: Quinn Cook, Amile Jefferson - 2

Lucas Oil Stadium, Indianapolis, Indiana
Attendance: 71,149
Referees: Joe DeRosa, Michael Stephens, and Pat Driscoll

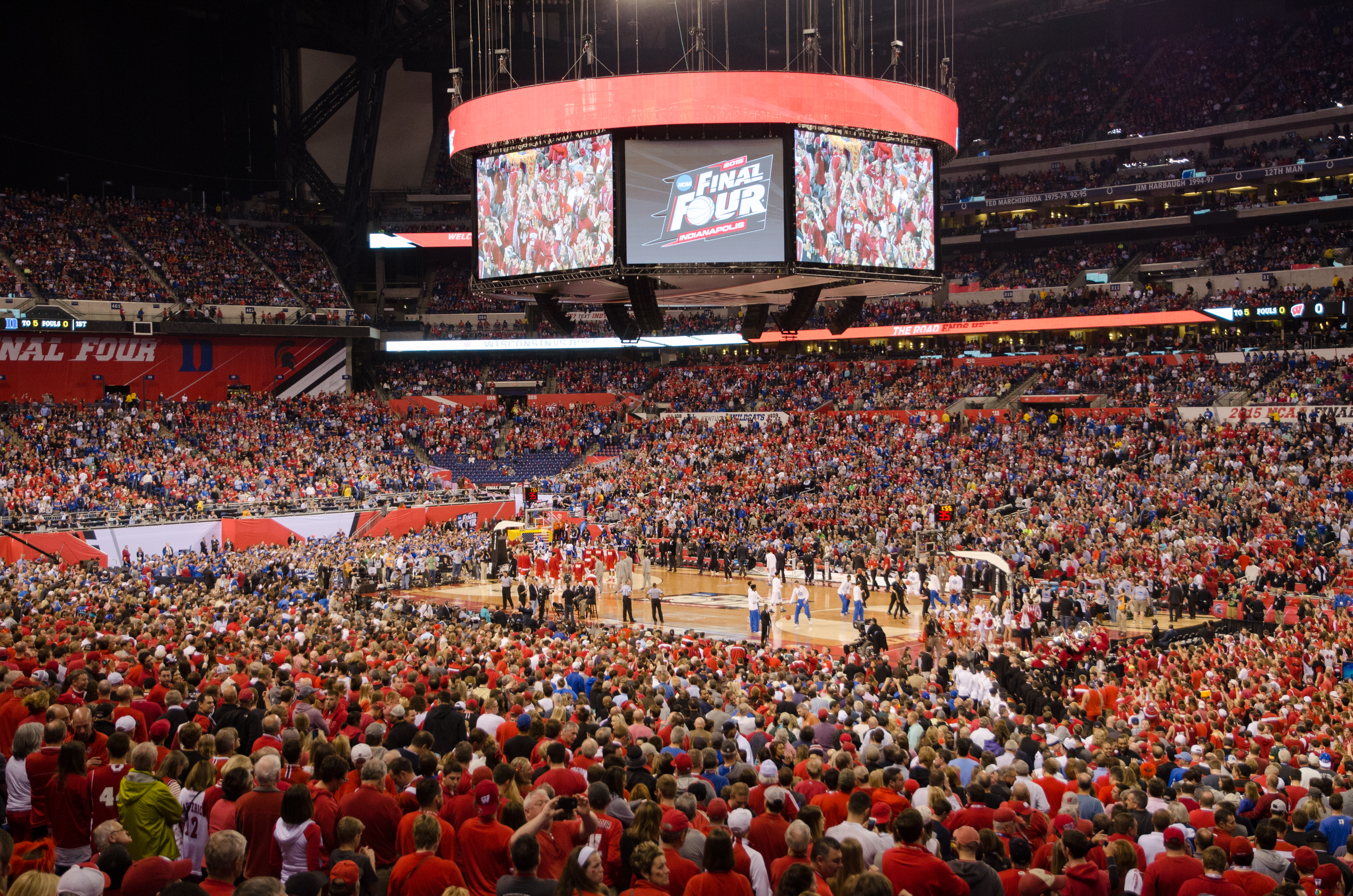
Lucas Oil Stadium before the game

The first half of the National Championship Game featured 13 lead changes and the two evenly matched teams traded baskets. Duke held the largest lead of the half at six points. Wisconsin did not shoot well early, but managed 11 second chance points as they erased the deficit. At the half, the game was tied 31–31, marking the first such tie since 1988. Wisconsin, which led the nation in fewest committed fouls per game, recorded just two first half fouls. Duke meanwhile committed seven fouls. Jahill Okafor sat the final 4:47 of the first half after picking up two fouls.

Wisconsin scored first in the second half and held the lead for most of the half as both Okafor and Justise Winslow spent extended periods on the bench due to foul trouble. Wisconsin's lead grew, reaching 9 points at the 13:25 mark, before Duke began to narrow the gap. Even as Wisconsin was building a lead, the foul situation was reversing itself—by the 11:43 mark, game fouls were even at 9 for each team. However, Okafor picked up his fourth foul at the 9:18 mark, sending him back to the bench.

Duke tied the game at 54 on a Tyus Jones jumper with 7:03 remaining. Two possessions later, Duke took the lead for the first time in the second half on a Grayson Allen basket at the 5:32 mark. With 3:30 left in the game, Okafor reentered the game with Duke holding a narrow 59–58 lead. He immediately made a difference, scoring on back-to-back possessions to give Duke a 63–58 lead.

With 1:53 left, a loose ball went out of bounds and the officials initially ruled that Wisconsin's Bronson Koenig touched it last, awarding the ball to Duke. After a lengthy replay review, the officials announced that the call would stand, in a controversial decision. A Jones 3-pointer on Duke's ensuing possession with 1:20 remaining then made it 66–58 before Frank Kaminsky narrowed the gap to 66–61. After a failed layup by Jones on a run out, Wisconsin cut the lead to 3 on a dunk. On the ensuing possession, Duke was fouled and made both free throws. A Wisconsin miss sealed the victory and Duke won by a final score of 68–63.

Jones finished with a game-high 23 points, while Grayson Allen added 16 for Duke. Guarded by Kaminsky, Okafor was limited to 10 points on the game. Kaminsky led Wisconsin with 21 points and all players with 12 rebounds. Four other Badgers finished in double figures. Wisconsin shot 41 percent for the game, seven percent below their season average.

After the game, Allen was cited as one of the main reasons for Duke's comeback and win by commentators. Mike Krzyzewski agreed, saying, "We were kind of dead in the water. We were nine points down and Grayson just put us on his back." Commenting on his team's loss, Bo Ryan credited Duke's physical defense saying "There was more body contact in this game than any game we played all year, and I just feel sorry for my guys that all of the sudden a game was like that, and I think they're struggling with that a little bit." Ryan, however, also blamed the officials, citing the disparity in fouls called during the second half (Wisconsin's 13 to Duke's 6) and the controversial replay review near the end of the game.

Media observers were also critical of the controversial replay review. Chris Chase of USA Today wrote that "three highly trained officials, deemed good enough to be reffing in the biggest game of the year, disagreed with all three CBS analysts, all of Twitter and every American watching". Sam Cooper of Yahoo! Sports was perplexed by the officials' explanation of the call that "they just couldn't see anything." NCAA's head of officiating, John Adams, later stated that the officials never saw the conclusive angle and got the call wrong as a result.

Jones was named the tournament's Most Outstanding Player. The win elevated Krzyewski to second all-time in men's basketball championships behind John Wooden who coached UCLA to 10. It was his fifth title overall and, coincidently, third in the city of Indianapolis.

== Media coverage ==
The Championship Game was broadcast in the United States by CBS. Jim Nantz was the play-by-play man with Bill Raftery and Grant Hill providing on-court commentary. Greg Gumbel and Ernie Johnson Jr. were the studio hosts. Charles Barkley, Seth Davis, Reggie Miller, Clark Kellogg, Kenny Smith and Steve Smith provided studio commentary. ESPN International owned the broadcast rights outside the United States. Dan Shulman served as the play-by-play announcer for the international audience, with Dick Vitale providing commentary.

Radio coverage in the United States was provided by Westwood One. The Championship Game was also streamed live for free on NCAA.com.

An average of 28.3 million watched the Championship Game on CBS, making the 2015 edition the most viewed NCAA men's basketball championship game since Arizona beat Kentucky in overtime in the 1997 contest.

== See also ==
- 2015 NCAA Women's Division I Basketball Championship Game
