= Grayson Allen =

USA basketball player (born 1995)

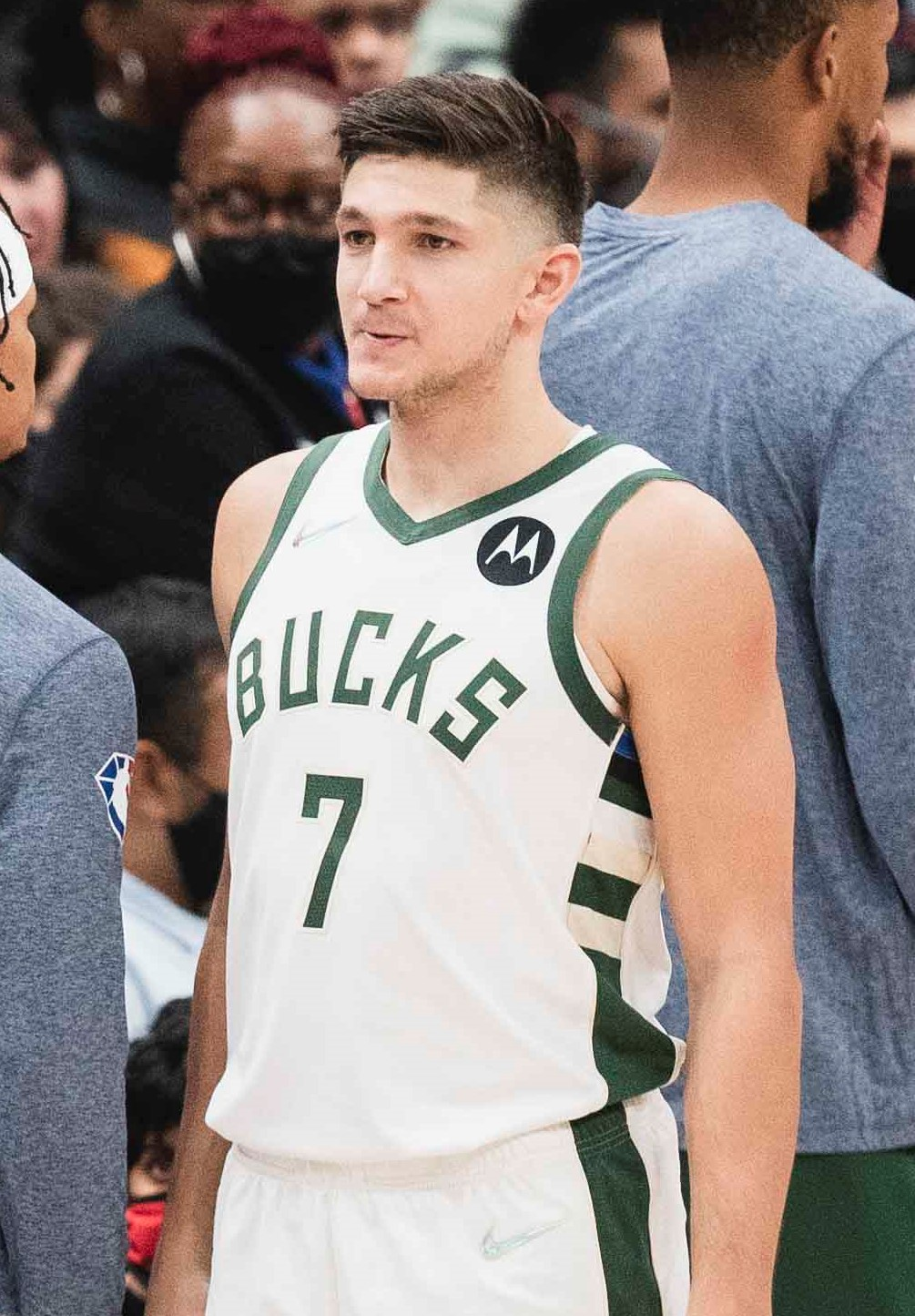
- Allen with the Milwaukee Bucks in 2021

No. 8 – Charlotte Hornets
- Position: Shooting guard
- League: NBA

Personal information
- Born: October 8, 1995 (age 31) Jacksonville, Florida, U.S.
- Listed height: 6 ft 4 in (1.93 m)
- Listed weight: 198 lb (90 kg)

Career information
- High school: Providence School (Jacksonville, Florida)
- College: Duke (2014–2018)
- NBA draft: 2018: 1st round, 21st overall pick
- Drafted by: Utah Jazz
- Playing career: 2018–present

Career history
- 2018–2019: Utah Jazz
- 2018–2019: →Salt Lake City Stars
- 2019–2021: Memphis Grizzlies
- 2021–2023: Milwaukee Bucks
- 2023–2026: Phoenix Suns
- 2026–present: Charlotte Hornets

Career highlights
- NCAA champion (2015); Second-team All-American – SN (2016); Third-team All-American – AP, NABC (2016); First-team All-ACC (2016); Third-team All-ACC (2018); McDonald's All-American (2014)
- Stats at NBA.com
- Stats at Basketball Reference

Grayson James Allen (born October 8, 1995) is an American professional basketball player for the Charlotte Hornets of the National Basketball Association (NBA). He played four years of college basketball for the Duke Blue Devils, where he helped Duke win a national championship in 2015. He has often been called one of Duke's best players of the 2010s. Allen was drafted with the 21st overall pick in the 2018 NBA draft by the Utah Jazz, where he played for one season before being traded to the Memphis Grizzlies in July 2019. In August 2021, Allen was traded to the Milwaukee Bucks, where he played for two seasons before being traded to the Phoenix Suns in September 2023.

== High school career ==
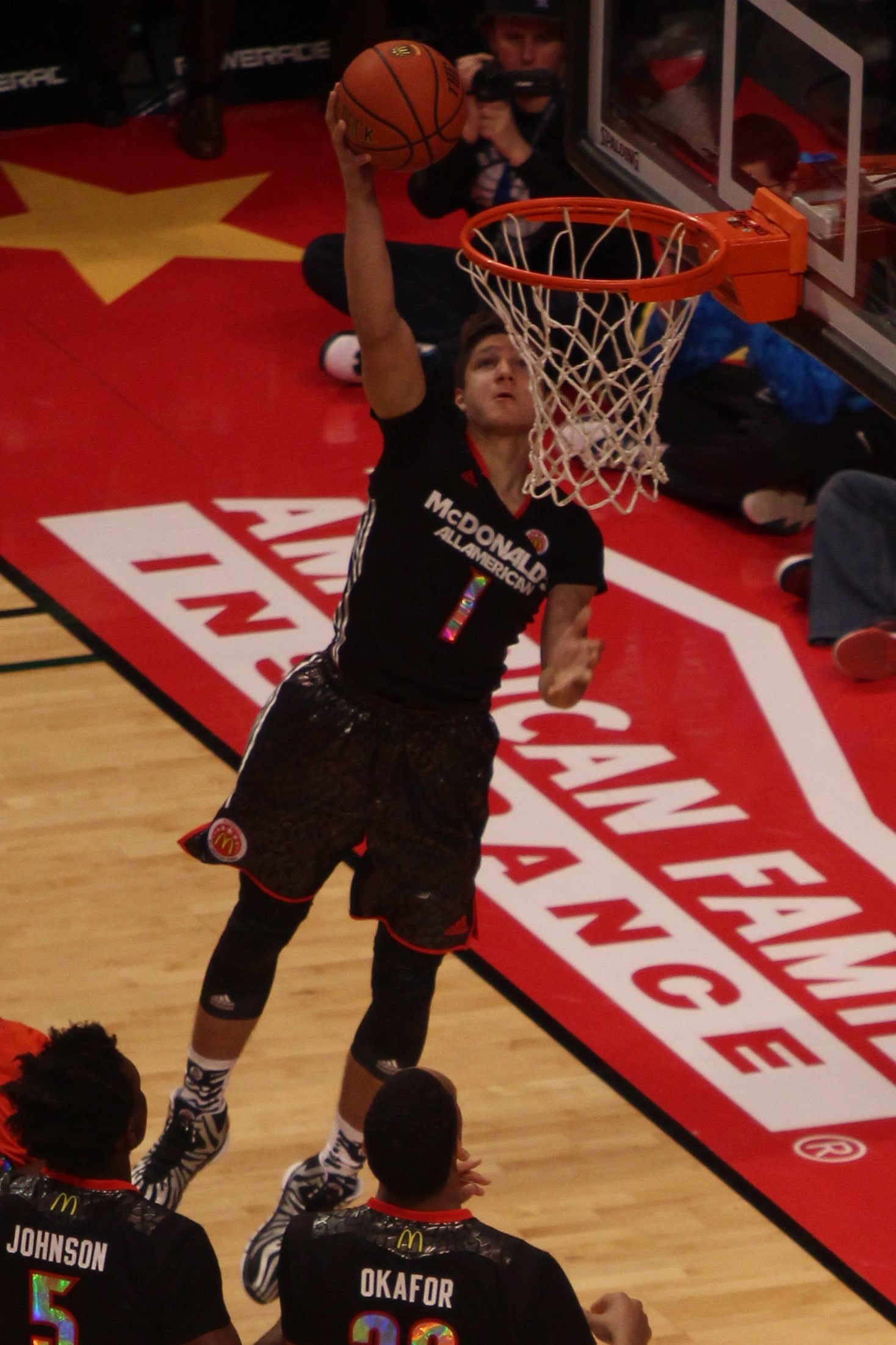
Allen dunking in the 2014 McDonald's All-American Game

In 2014, Allen was selected as a McDonald's All-American out of Providence School in Jacksonville, Florida, where he won a state championship the previous year. He won the McDonald's All-American Slam Dunk Contest, jumping over future Duke teammate Jahlil Okafor.

== College career ==
=== Freshman season (2014–2015) ===
During Allen's freshman season at Duke, he averaged 4.4 points per game and was named to the ACC all-academic team. Allen became a major contributor in the NCAA tournament. On April 7, 2015, he helped Duke to victory in the NCAA championship game, scoring 16 points. After the game, commentators cited Allen as one of the main reasons for Duke's win. Coach Mike Krzyzewski agreed, saying, "We were kind of dead in the water. We were nine points down and Grayson just put us on his back."

=== Sophomore season (2015–2016) ===
Allen received national attention following an incident during a game against Louisville Cardinals. On February 8, 2016, Allen was assessed a flagrant-one foul after he tripped Louisville forward Ray Spalding. Commentators said the move appeared to be intentional, as Allen stuck out his leg while on the ground as Spalding was hopping over him.

In Duke's second game against Louisville, Allen exchanged elbows while scuffling for the ball and was later ejected for yelling at a referee after being called for his fifth foul. On February 25, in the closing seconds of a 15-point win against Florida State, Allen tripped opposing guard Xavier Rathan-Mayes. A day later, Allen received a reprimand from the Atlantic Coast Conference (ACC) for his second tripping incident in less than a month.

During the 2015–16 season, Allen was one of the best offensive players in the ACC, averaging 21 points per game and shooting 41% from three-point range. He played an average of 36.6 minutes per game and made 83.7% of his free throws. In the NCAA tournament, Allen scored 29 points in Duke's 71–64 win over Yale, helping the team to reach the Sweet Sixteen. The team lost its next game to top-seeded Oregon, 82–68; Allen had difficulty scoring near the basket during that game, finishing with 15 points.

=== Junior season (2016–2017) ===
Entering his junior season, Allen was considered one of the top returning players in college basketball. He was named to the Associated Press preseason All-America team and was the ACC media's pick as preseason ACC Player of the Year.

On November 12, 2016, Allen scored 25 points and 10 rebounds in a 96–61 win over Grand Canyon. On November 29, 2016, Allen scored 24 points and 4 assists in a 78–69 win against Michigan State in the ACC-Big Ten Challenge. On December 10, 2016, Allen tallied 34 points in a 94–45 victory over UNLV. On January 28, 2017, Allen scored 19 points in an 85–83 win against Wake Forest. On January 30, 2017, Allen scored 21 points and 5 assists in an 84–74 victory over Notre Dame. On February 4, 2017, Allen scored 21 points in a 72–64 win against Pittsburgh. On February 9, 2017, Allen scored 25 points and 3 assists in an 86–78 win over rival North Carolina.

Prior to the start of the season, Allen stated that he was ready to put the previous season's tripping incidents behind him. However, on December 21, he tripped Elon's Steven Santa Ana and was charged with a technical foul. The next day, Duke coach Mike Krzyzewski suspended Allen from the team indefinitely. After Duke's December 31 game, Krzyzewski stripped Allen of his team captaincy. Allen returned to play on January 4, 2017, after serving a one-game suspension.

During the 2016–2017 season, Allen averaged 14.5 points per game and shot 36.5% from three-point range. He averaged 29.6 minutes per game and shot 81.1% from the free-throw line. Duke reached the second round of the NCAA tournament, where the team was upset by South Carolina; Allen scored 20 points in the defeat.

=== Senior season (2017–2018) ===
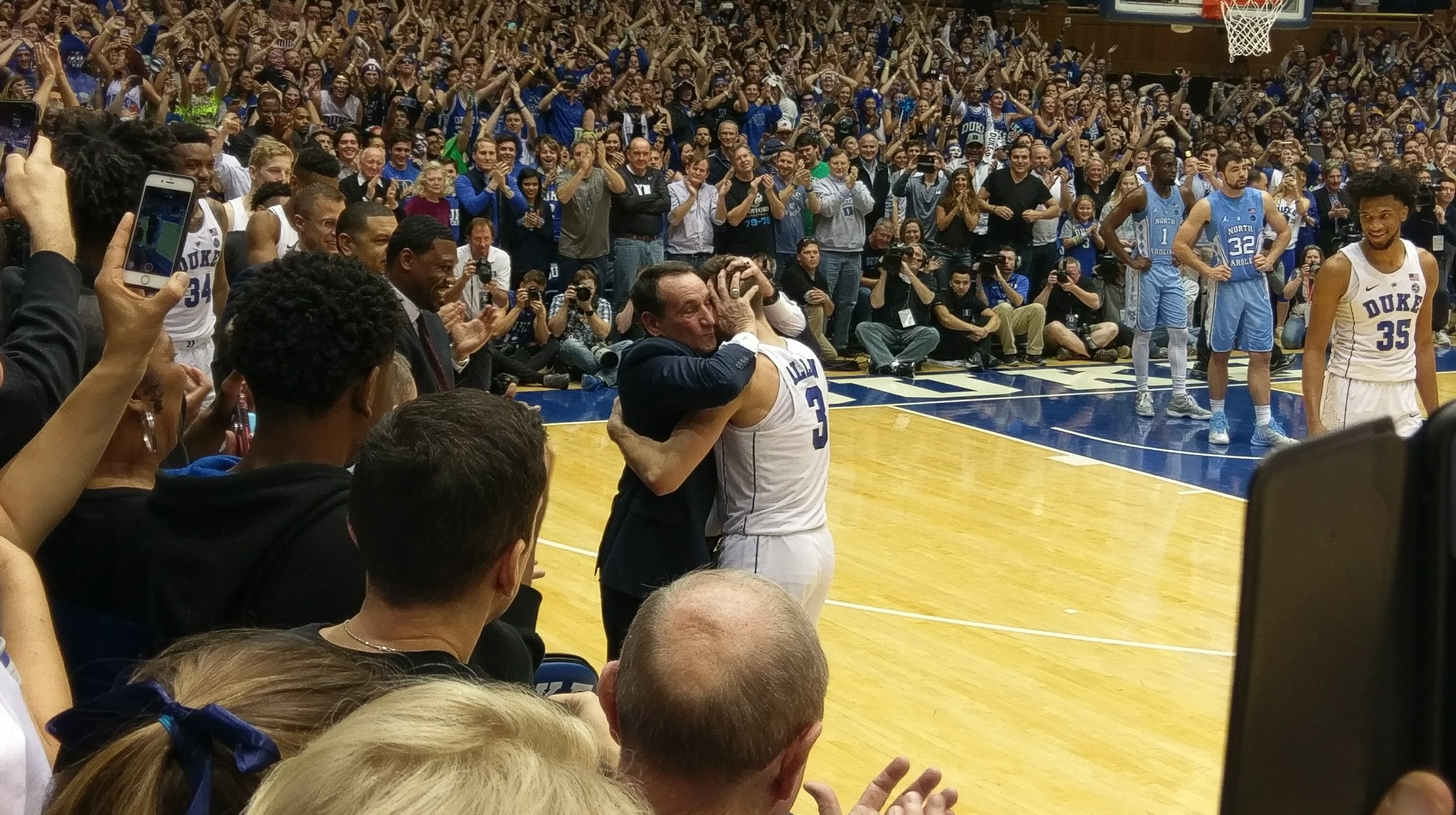
Coach K embraces Allen at the end of his final home game at Duke University.

On April 18, 2017, it was announced Allen would return to Duke for his senior season. The team voted to restore him as captain for the 2017–18 season. On November 14, 2017, Allen scored 37 points in an 88–81 win against Michigan State. On November 29, 2017, Allen scored 21 points in a 91–81 victory over Indiana. On December 2, 2017, Allen scored 25 points and 3 rebounds in a 96–80 win against South Dakota. On December 30, 2017, Allen scored 22 points and 3 rebounds in a 100–93 win over Florida State. For the season, Allen averaged 15.5 points per game on 41.8% shooting.

On March 9, 2018, Allen was assessed a flagrant-one foul in the ACC tournament for tripping North Carolina's Garrison Brooks with what was called a "hip check."

Duke reached the Elite Eight in the NCAA tournament, where the team was defeated by Kansas, 85–81, in overtime. In his final collegiate game, Allen scored 12 points on 3-for-13 shooting, missed a potential game-winning shot, and missed two three-pointers late in overtime; he did, however, make several clutch free throws. Scott Gleeson of USA Today commented that the season "was a resurgent one for Allen as a whole, in spite of the sour ending. He took on the role of senior captain on a young team full of NBA talent. It was a flipped script from a year ago when Allen was seen as the villain of the sport for his unsportsmanlike behavior..."

=== Overall career ===
During his four seasons at Duke, Allen appeared in 142 games and averaged 14.1 points, 3.2 rebounds and 3.0 assists. He maintained a field-goal percentage of .430, a three-point field-goal percentage of .380, and a free-throw percentage of .834. Allen finished his Duke career with 1,996 points, ranking 12th on the Blue Devils' career scoring list. Allen played in 15 NCAA tournament games, helping the Blue Devils win the 2015 NCAA national championship. He earned All-America and Academic All-America honors in 2016, becoming the sixth Blue Devil to receive both honors in the same season. Allen also earned All-ACC Academic honors four times.

== Professional career ==
=== Utah Jazz (2018–2019) ===
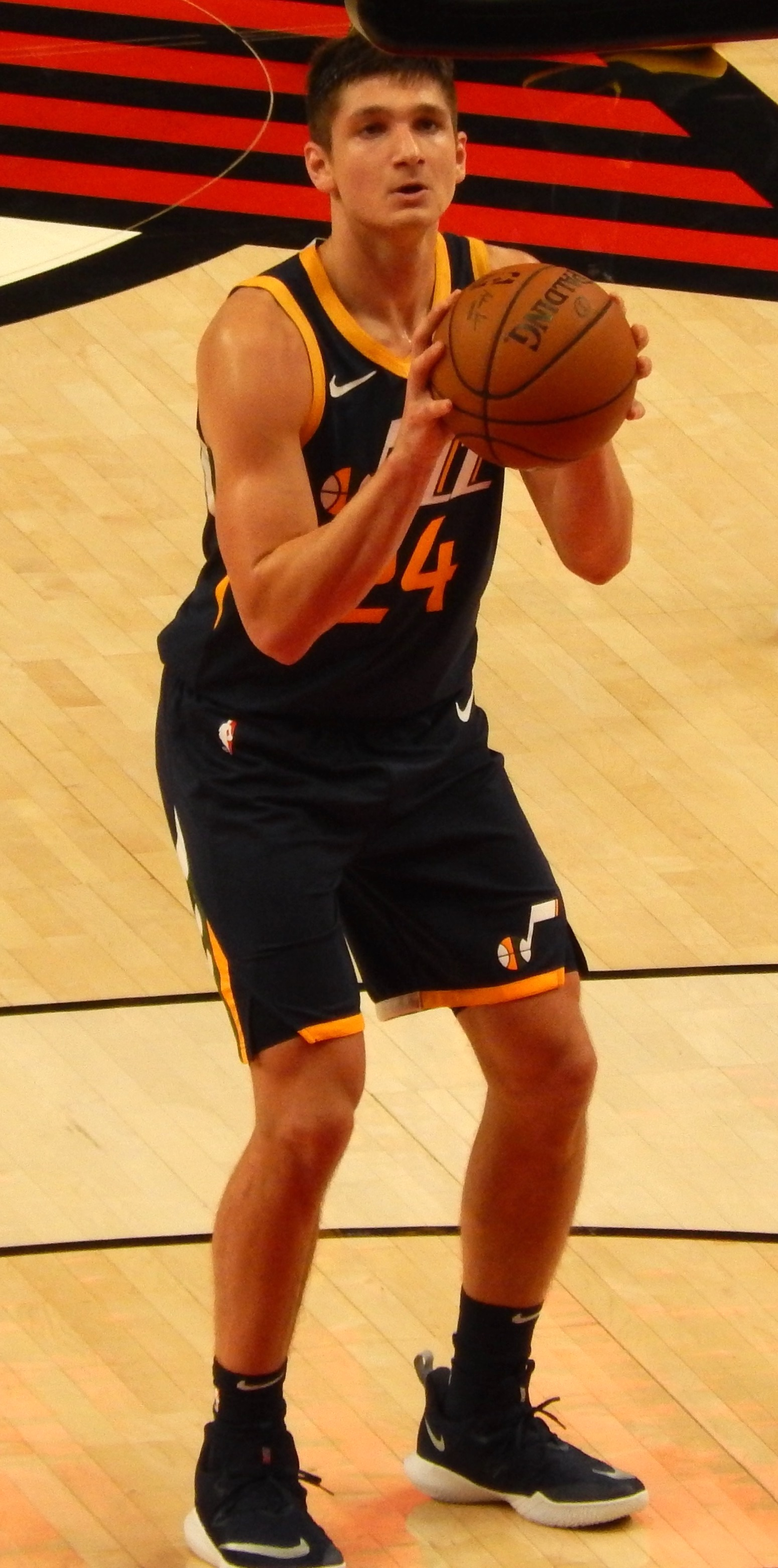
Allen with the Utah Jazz in 2018

On June 21, 2018, Allen was selected with the 21st overall pick by the Utah Jazz in the 2018 NBA draft. On July 2, Allen signed a four-year rookie scale contract with the Jazz. He made his NBA debut on October 22, against the Memphis Grizzlies, scoring 7 points in 11 minutes off the bench. On April 10, 2019, Allen scored a career-high 40 points with seven rebounds, four assists, a steal and a block in a 137–143 overtime loss to the Los Angeles Clippers.

=== Memphis Grizzlies (2019–2021) ===
On July 6, 2019, Allen was traded, alongside Jae Crowder, Kyle Korver, the draft rights to Darius Bazley and a future first-round pick, to the Memphis Grizzlies in exchange for Mike Conley. On July 11, he was ejected from an NBA Summer League game between the Grizzlies and the Boston Celtics after committing back-to-back flagrant fouls that were described by commentators as "cheap shots". On October 23, he made his debut for the Grizzlies, logging five points, two assists and one rebound in a 101–120 loss to the Miami Heat. On October 29, Allen recorded a season-high two steals in a 91–120 loss to the Los Angeles Lakers. On December 4, he grabbed a season-high seven rebounds in a 99–106 loss to the Chicago Bulls. On August 5, 2020, Allen scored a season-high 20 points and logged a career-high six 3-pointers along with two rebounds and one assist in 26 minutes of action in a 115–124 loss to the Utah Jazz. He matched this point total on August 9, where he also grabbed four rebounds and one assist in a 99–108 loss to the Toronto Raptors.

On December 16, 2020, Memphis announced that they had exercised their team option on Allen for the 2021–22 season. On December 23, he made his season debut for the Grizzlies, logging six points, two rebounds and five assists in a 119–131 loss to the San Antonio Spurs. On March 27, 2021, Allen recorded a career-high four steals in a 110–126 loss to the Utah Jazz. On April 7, he recorded a season-high 30 points, along with four rebounds and three assists, in a 131–113 win over the Atlanta Hawks. On May 5, he suffered an abdominal injury in a 139–135 win over the Minnesota Timberwolves. He missed the Grizzlies' last seven regular season games, but returned in time for the playoffs. On May 29, against his former team the Jazz, Allen recorded a playoff career-high 17 points in 29 minutes. This was his only double-digit scoring performance in the playoffs. The Grizzlies would eventually lose the series in five games.

=== Milwaukee Bucks (2021–2023) ===
On August 7, 2021, Allen was traded by the Grizzlies to the Milwaukee Bucks for Sam Merrill and two future second-round draft picks. Bucks general manager Jon Horst commented, "Grayson is a talented guard... His three-point shooting, energy, toughness and basketball IQ make him a great addition, and we're excited to welcome him to Milwaukee." On October 18, Allen signed a reported 2-year, $20 million rookie scale extension with the Bucks. The next day, he made his debut for the team, recording 10 points, 6 assists and 4 rebounds in a win over the Brooklyn Nets.

On January 21, 2022, during a game against the Chicago Bulls, Allen fouled opposing guard Alex Caruso and was ejected from the game after he received a flagrant 2 foul. Bulls coach Billy Donovan publicly condemned Allen after the game, citing Allen's history of dangerous plays and stating that he "could've ended [Caruso's] career." Caruso suffered a fractured right wrist and was ruled out for 6 to 8 weeks. On January 23, Grayson was suspended for one game by the NBA. On the incident, Allen said, "It was unfortunate how it played out. I jumped to block it with my left, and as I'm spinning went to grab the ball with my right hand, not throw him down. It was a really hard fall and I'm glad he's okay. If I could do the play over again knowing he'd fall like that I wouldn't make the play."

On April 22, 2022, during Game 3 of the first round of the playoffs, Allen scored a then-playoff career-high 22 points in a 111–81 win over the Chicago Bulls. Two days later, he bested this total with 27 points alongside three steals in a 119–95 Game 4 win.

On January 4, 2023, Allen scored 16 points, including a game-winning three point shot, during a 104–101 overtime win over the Toronto Raptors.

=== Phoenix Suns (2023–2026) ===
On September 27, 2023, Allen, alongside Portland Trail Blazers players Jusuf Nurkić, Nassir Little and Keon Johnson, was traded to the Phoenix Suns as part of a three-team trade that sent Damian Lillard to the Milwaukee Bucks and Jrue Holiday, Deandre Ayton, Toumani Camara and a 2029 first-round draft pick to the Portland Trail Blazers. On November 6, Allen scored a season-high 26 points as a starter with a career-high 8-of-13 three-pointers made in a tense 116–115 overtime win over the Chicago Bulls. On Christmas Day, Allen scored a new season high with 32 points made as a starter while making 8/17 three-pointers in a loss to the Dallas Mavericks. On January 5, 2024, Allen scored 31 points with a new career-high 9-of-14 three-pointers made in a 113–97 win over the Miami Heat. The three-pointers made that game tied a franchise record previously set multiple times between former Suns players Quentin Richardson, Channing Frye, Aron Baynes, Cameron Johnson, and Landry Shamet. He later tied his three-point record for a single game eleven days later; that game led to him only scoring 27 points that time, but he was a key contributor to a historic game where the Suns had a 22-point fourth-quarter comeback and 32-8 late game comeback stretch to upset the Sacramento Kings and win 119–117 at home. On February 8, Allen broke his career high in assists by the end of the first half; he later finished with a career-high 14 assists in a 129–115 win over the Utah Jazz. On March 7, Allen put up 28 points on eight three-pointers made, with 21 points coming in the first quarter which set a career high for points in a quarter, in a 120–113 win over the Toronto Raptors. On March 20, Allen matched his season-high of 32 points with his third game of scoring 9 three-pointers made in a single game this season in a 115–102 win over the Philadelphia 76ers.

By the end of his first season with the Suns, Allen led the NBA in three-point shooting percentage with a 46.1% rating that season. He became the second Suns player behind Craig Hodges (and first player to be with the team throughout an entire season) to lead the NBA in three-point field goal shooting percentages in a season. On April 15, 2024, Allen signed a four-year, $70 million extension with Suns.

On February 7, 2025, Allen had 21 points, 7 rebounds and 6 assists in a 135-127 overtime win over the Utah Jazz. In the final 4.4 seconds of regulation, Allen scored 6 points on 2 3-pointers, including a buzzer-beater that tied the game at 122 going into overtime.

On November 10, 2025, Allen put up a career-high 42 points on 10-of-15 three-point shooting in a 121–98 win over the New Orleans Pelicans. His 10 three-pointers made set a Suns franchise record for the most three-pointers made in a game. Allen ended the season averaging a career-high 16.5 points per game, helping the Suns achieve a 45–37 record and the eighth seed in the playoffs, although Allen did not play in either of the team's play-in tournament games due to a left hamstring strain.

The Suns faced the reigning champion and top-seeded Oklahoma City Thunder during their first round playoff series. After missing the first two games due to injury, Allen returned in Game 3, recording seven points in a 121–109 loss. The Suns would end up being swept by the Thunder in four games.

=== Charlotte Hornets (2026–present) ===
On July 13, 2026, Allen, Royce O'Neale and a 2033 first-round pick were traded to the Charlotte Hornets in exchange for Miles Bridges, a 2029 first-round pick and a 2027 second-round pick. On October 21, Allen made his Hornets debut, recording 21 points, three rebounds and four assists in a 110–103 win over the Brooklyn Nets.

== Personal life ==
Allen began dating Morgan Reid while both were students at Duke. Reid was a player on the Duke women's soccer team, and has since turned professional, playing in the NWSL for both the North Carolina Courage and the Orlando Pride, before retiring in 2022 due to a severe hip issue. The couple got engaged in February 2022 and married on July 23, 2022. In October 2024, Allen and his wife welcomed a baby girl.

== Career statistics ==
Legend
GP	Games played	GS	Games started	MPG	Minutes per game
FG%	Field goal percentage	3P%	3-point field goal percentage	FT%	Free throw percentage
RPG	Rebounds per game	APG	Assists per game	SPG	Steals per game
BPG	Blocks per game	PPG	Points per game	**Bold**	Career high
*	Led the league

=== NBA ===
==== Regular season ====
Year	Team	GP	GS	MPG	FG%	3P%	FT%	RPG	APG	SPG	BPG	PPG
2018–19	Utah	38	2	11.0	.376	.323	.750	.6	.7	.2	.2	5.6
2019–20	Memphis	38	0	18.9	.466	.404	.867	2.2	1.4	.3	.1	8.7
2020–21	Memphis	50	38	25.2	.418	.391	.868	3.2	2.2	.9	.2	10.6
2021–22	Milwaukee	66	61	27.3	.448	.409	.865	3.4	1.5	.7	.3	11.1
2022–23	Milwaukee	72	70	27.4	.440	.399	**.905**	3.3	2.3	.9	.2	10.4
2023–24	Phoenix	**75**	**74**	**33.5**	**.499**	**.461***	.878	**3.9**	3.0	.9	**.6**	13.5
2024–25	Phoenix	64	7	24.1	.448	.426	.816	3.0	2.1	.8	.3	10.6
2025–26	Phoenix	51	27	28.8	.403	.349	.857	3.0	**3.8**	**1.4**	.3	**16.5**
Career		454	279	25.8	.443	.403	.857	3.0	2.2	.8	.3	11.2

==== Playoffs ====
Year	Team	GP	GS	MPG	FG%	3P%	FT%	RPG	APG	SPG	BPG	PPG
2019	Utah	2	0	7.0	.286	.000	.714	.5	.0	.0	.0	4.5
2021	Memphis	5	0	23.2	.364	.381	.000	2.6	.2	.4	.2	6.4
2022	Milwaukee	**12**	**5**	25.4	.451	.396	.636	2.9	1.3	**.7**	.3	8.3
2023	Milwaukee	5	**5**	**29.9**	**.463**	**.483**	.857	2.4	1.8	.4	.0	**11.6**
2024	Phoenix	2	2	21.5	.200	.200	**1.000**	**4.0**	1.0	.5	.0	3.5
2026	Phoenix	2	0	19.0	.462	.364	.750	2.0	**2.0**	.0	**1.0**	9.5
Career		28	12	23.8	.425	.393	.735	2.6	1.1	.5	.3	8.0

=== College ===
Year	Team	GP	GS	MPG	FG%	3P%	FT%	RPG	APG	SPG	BPG	PPG
2014–15	Duke	35	0	9.2	.425	.346	.849	1.0	.4	.3	**.1**	4.4
2015–16	Duke	36	35	**36.6**	**.466**	**.417**	.837	**4.6**	3.5	1.3	**.1**	**21.6**
2016–17	Duke	34	25	29.6	.395	.365	.811	3.7	3.5	.8	**.1**	14.5
2017–18	Duke	**37**	**37**	35.6	.418	.370	**.850**	3.3	**4.6**	**1.7**	**.1**	15.5
Career		142	97	27.9	.430	.380	.834	3.2	3.0	1.0	.1	14.1

== See also ==
- List of NBA career 3-point field goal percentage leaders
