= Amile Jefferson =

American basketball player (born 1993)

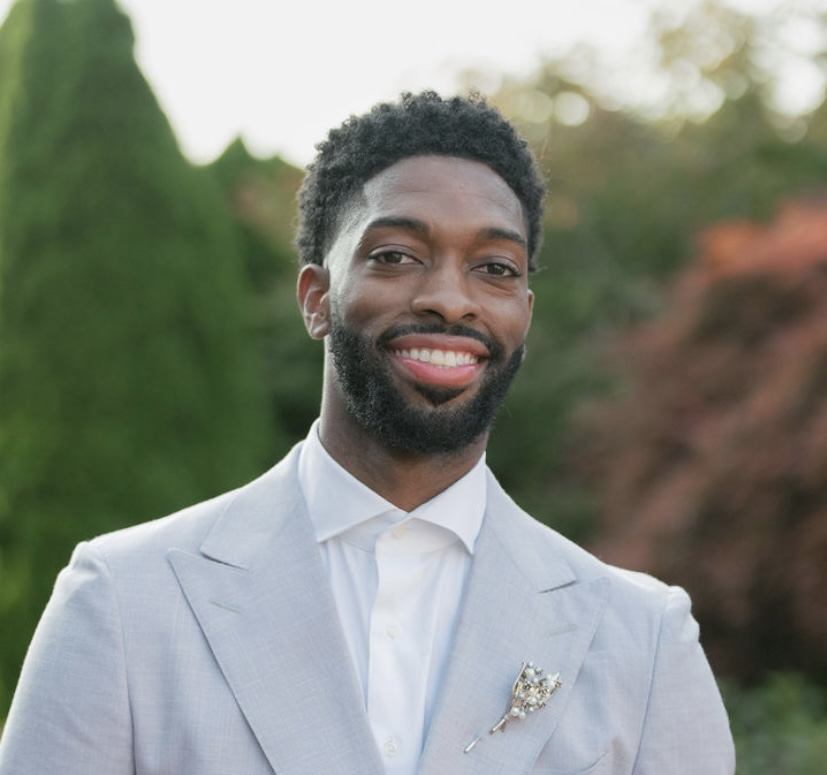
- Jefferson in 2023

Boston Celtics
- Title: Assistant coach
- League: NBA

Personal information
- Born: May 7, 1993 (age 33) Philadelphia, Pennsylvania, U.S.
- Listed height: 6 ft 9 in (2.06 m)
- Listed weight: 222 lb (101 kg)

Career information
- High school: Friends' Central (Philadelphia, Pennsylvania)
- College: Duke (2012–2017)
- NBA draft: 2017: undrafted
- Playing career: 2017–2021
- Position: Power forward
- Number: 11, 17
- Coaching career: 2022–present

Career history

Playing
- 2017–2018: Iowa Wolves
- 2018–2020: Orlando Magic
- 2018–2020: →Lakeland Magic
- 2020–2021: Galatasaray

Coaching
- 2022–2023: Duke (assistant)
- 2023–present: Boston Celtics (assistant)

Career highlights
- As player: Second-team All NBA G League (2018); Third-team All NBA G League (2019); NBA G League All-Defensive Team (2018); NBA G League All-Rookie Team (2018); NBA G League rebounding leader (2018); NCAA champion (2015); McDonald's All-American (2012); Gatorade Pennsylvania Player of the Year (2012); As assistant coach: NBA champion (2024)
- Stats at NBA.com
- Stats at Basketball Reference

Amile Oliver Jefferson (born May 7, 1993) is an American professional basketball coach and former player. He is currently an assistant coach for the Boston Celtics of the National Basketball Association (NBA). He played college basketball for the Duke Blue Devils, where he served as a captain for three seasons, including for the 2014–15 NCAA championship team.

== High school career ==
Jefferson was born and raised in Philadelphia and attended Friends' Central School where he was coached by Jason Polykoff.

He was ranked as the No. 21 overall recruit in the 2012 high school class by Scout, as well as No. 25 by ESPN and No. 36 by Rivals. With his solid play, Jefferson was selected for the 2012 McDonald's All-American Game, where he scored eight points and grabbed three rebounds. He was also named Gatorade Pennsylvania Player of the Year and Philadelphia Inquirer Player of the Year as both a junior and senior.

He led Friends Central to a 98–14 record and four Pennsylvania Independent Schools Tournament titles. He finished his high school career with 1,569 points, 839 rebounds and 189 blocks. He was a USA Today second-team All-USA as a senior in 2012 after averaging 19.9 points, 10.2 rebounds and 2.7 steals per game.

Jefferson led the 2011 NBPA Top 100 Camp in scoring with an average of 20.8 points per game. And averaged 19.4 points and 7.0 rebounds at the 2011 Adidas Nations. He averaged 17.7 points, 9.7 rebounds and 1.9 blocks per game as a junior at Friends Central.

== College career ==
=== Career overall ===
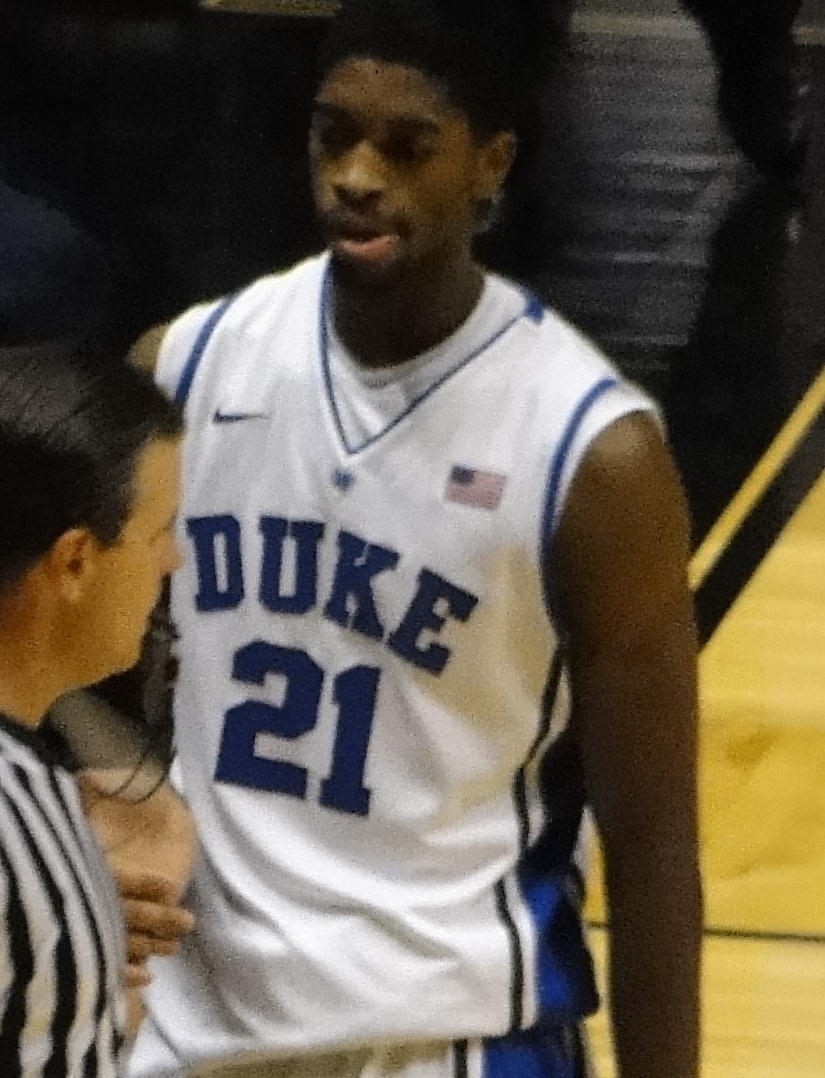
Jefferson with the Duke Blue Devils in 2012

He played in a program-record 150 games, including 103 starts, and averaged 7.2 points and 6.3 rebounds; finished his career tied for seventh in NCAA history with 150 games played. He helped lead Duke to a 124–26 record in games in which he played, the third-most victories in program history. Duke went 67–2 (.971) at Cameron Indoor Stadium over the course of his career, the most home wins and second-best home winning percentage in Duke history.

He played in 12 NCAA tournament games, helping Duke win its fifth NCAA championship in 2015; owned career NCAA tournament averages of 3.6 points, 5.2 rebounds and 1.1 blocks. He finished his career ranked third in Duke history in offensive rebounds (361), seventh in blocks (138), 11th in total rebounds (944) and 59th in scoring (1,079). He capped his career with the second-best field goal percentage in Duke history at .620 (min. 300 FGM). Being just the 11th player in Duke history to amass 1,000 points and 900 rebounds in his career, he also scored in double figures 49 times, had double-figure rebounds 29 times and compiled 17 double-doubles. He was a three-time team captain and the only player in Duke history to be named to the All-ACC Academic Team four times.

He graduated with a Bachelor of Arts in history and a Master of Arts in Christian Studies from the Duke Divinity School.

=== Freshman season (2012–2013) ===
He was a member of the All-ACC Academic Team and appeared in 32 games with seven starts, averaging 4.0 points and 2.9 rebounds. Jefferson averaged 1.3 offensive rebounds per game, second-best on the team. He scored in double figures six times on the year. Jefferson recorded 11 points, nine rebounds and three blocks in a home win over Maryland (January 26) and scored a season-high 14 points in a home win over Boston College (February 24).

=== Sophomore season (2013–2014) ===
He was a member of the All-ACC Academic Team. He played in all 35 games with 26 starts, averaging 6.5 points and 6.9 rebounds while shooting .644 from the field. For the season, he ranked fourth in the ACC in offensive rebounds per game (2.9) and 11th in total rebounds per game (6.9). Raised his rebounding numbers to 7.2 total rebounds and 3.1 offensive boards per game in ACC play; ranked seventh in total rebounds and fourth in offensive rebounds in ACC action.

He led Duke in rebounds 11 times on the season and posted eight games with double-figure boards. And scored 17 points on 7-of-9 shooting against Kansas in the Champions Classic in Chicago (11/12). Tallied 10 points and a career-high 15 rebounds in a home win over Virginia (1/13). Jefferson contributed to a win at No. 18 Pittsburgh (1/27) with 14 points and 10 rebounds. He was named to the ACC All-Tournament second team after averaging 7.7 points and 8.0 rebounds to help lead Duke to the championship game.

=== Junior season (2014–2015) ===
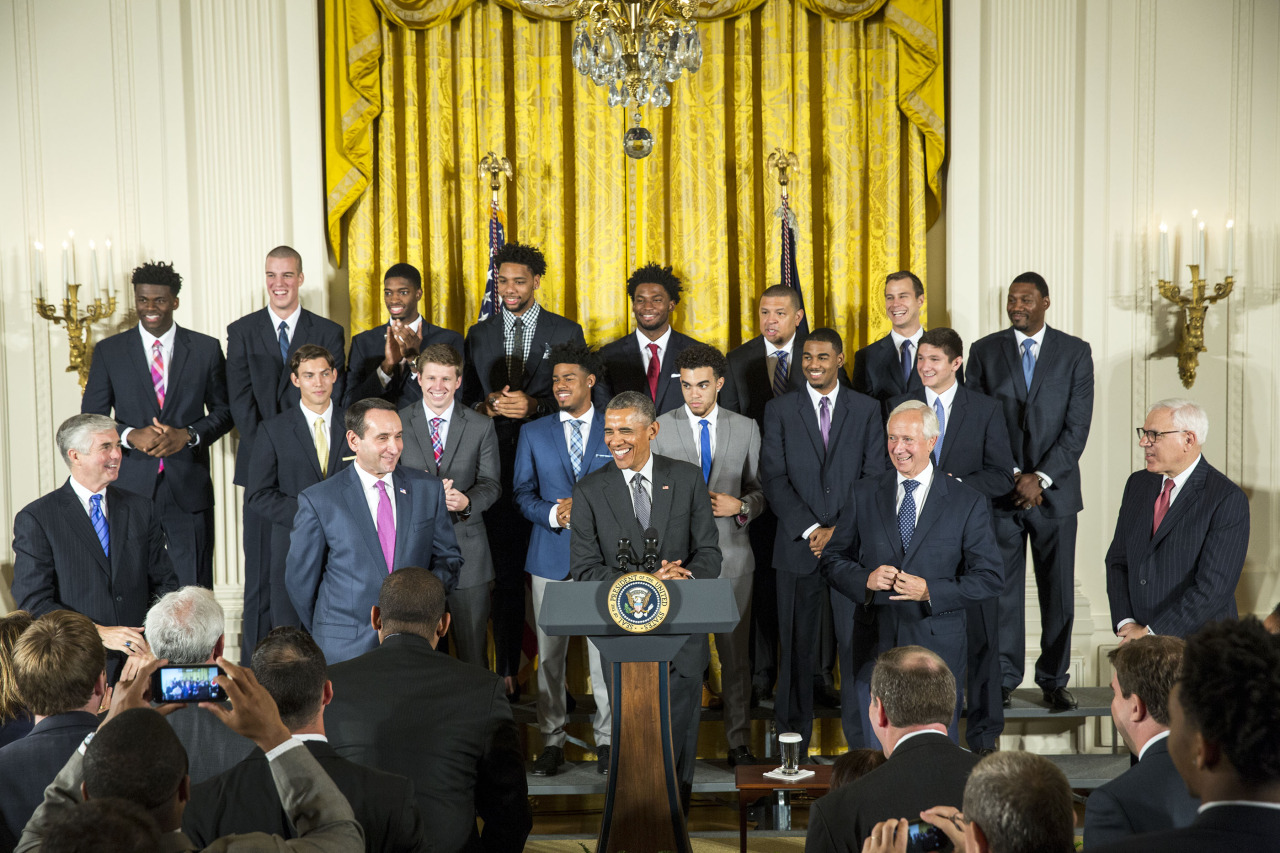
Duke Blue Devils in the White House East Room Ceremony 2015

He played in all 39 games, making 26 starts averaged 6.1 points and 5.8 rebounds while shooting .631 from the floor. Ranked 20th in the ACC in rebound average (5.8) and led Duke in rebounds nine times. He ranked second on the team with an average of 2.3 offensive rebounds per game. He scored in double figures 10 times on the season and recorded three double-doubles. Averaged 2.8 points and 4.1 rebounds in the six NCAA tournament games on Duke's run to the 2015 national title

Jefferson netted a career-high 19 points and added seven rebounds in a win at No. 6 Louisville (January 17). He scored 13 points and blocked a career-high six shots in Duke's overtime home win over No. 15 North Carolina (February 18). He provided a defensive spark with seven rebounds and three blocks in the win over No. 3 Wisconsin in the 2015 NCAA Division I men's basketball championship game.

=== Redshirt season (2015–2016) ===
He started the first nine games of the season, averaging 11.4 points and 10.3 rebounds while shooting .683 from the floor but missed the final 27 games of the season with a right foot fracture. Prior to his injury, he led Duke in rebounds eight times and posted three double-doubles in nine games.

He opened the season with a career-high-tying 19 points on 7-of-9 shooting in a home win over Siena (11/13). Jefferson scored 16 points and tied his career high with 15 rebounds against No. 2 Kentucky at the Champions Classic in Chicago (11/17). He played a career-high-tying 35 minutes in a home win over Indiana (12/2), finishing with 11 rebounds, a career-best eight assists and three blocks.

=== Senior season (2016–2017) ===
Jefferson Senior CLASS Award finalist and a first-team Senior CLASS Award All-American. And named to the All-ACC Tournament second team after averaging 8.8 points, 6.3 rebounds and 2.0 blocks to help Duke become the first team to win four games in four days to take the championship. A Hall of Fame Tip-Off All-Tournament Team member after averaging 16.5 points and 15.0 rebounds in two games in Connecticut as Duke captured the tournament trophy. He was named ACC Player of the Week once (12/12) and was a member of the preseason watch list for the Karl Malone Award.

== Professional career ==
=== Iowa Wolves (2017–2018) ===
After graduating with his Masters from Duke, Jefferson signed on with the Minnesota Timberwolves for 2017 summer league action, which ran from July 7 to 17 in Las Vegas, Nevada. On September 18, 2017, Jefferson signed with the Minnesota Timberwolves. He was waived on October 14 as one of the team's final preseason roster cuts. He joined the Iowa Wolves, Minnesota's development team, in the NBA G League as an affiliate player. Subsequent to the 2017 All-NBA G League Showcase, on January 15, 2018, the Minnesota Timberwolves signed Amile Jefferson to a two-way contract. On April 11, 2018, at the end of the 2017–18 NBA season, the Timberwolves converted Jefferson's contract to a standard NBA contract, thus making him playable in time for the 2018 NBA playoffs. Jefferson remained with the Minnesota Timberwolves for 2018 summer league, leading the league with 12.6 rebounds per game. Jefferson also averaged 8.6 points per game.

As a member of the Iowa Wolves, Jefferson averaged 35 minutes per game with 18 points and 13 rebounds (NBA G League leader). His strong performance in the first half of the season generated considerable buzz, with a highlight being his leadership during the team's first matchup of the 2018 NBA G League showcase. Jefferson led the Wolves with 29 points, 15 rebounds, and 6 assists in a 100–97 win against the Canton Charge, after the Wolves trailed by 20 points in the first half. He earned the honor of being named to the All-NBA G League Showcase 2018 First Team. With these consistently strong performances, he has been described as "[epitomizing] what the NBA G League is all about." After a strong performance throughout the first half of the season, the NBA G League announced February 2, 2018 that Amile Jefferson was named to the Mid-Season All-NBA G League Western Conference Team. The teams were voted by G League coaches, general managers and players.

Jefferson finished his rookie NBA G League season as the league leader in rebounds per game (13 RPG), and in the last game of the regular season for the Iowa Wolves, Amile Jefferson broke the single-season record for NBA G League double-doubles with 36 double-doubles in 47 games. On April 16, 2018, the NBA G League named Amile Jefferson to three All-NBA G League teams: the 2017–18 All-NBA G League All-Rookie First Team, All-NBA G League All-Defensive First Team and All-NBA G League Second Team.

=== Orlando Magic (2018–2020) ===
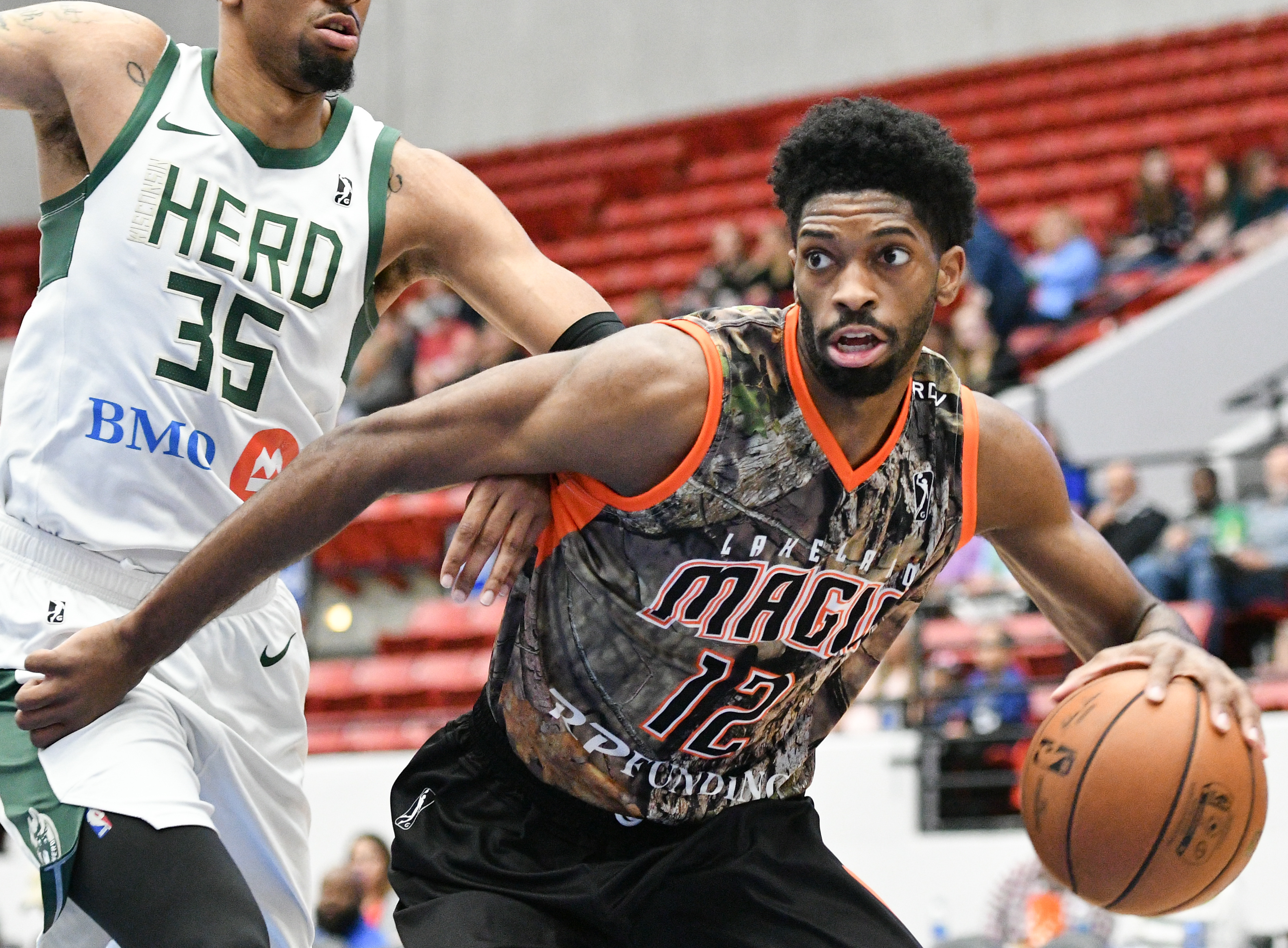
Jefferson with the Lakeland Magic (2019)

On July 27, 2018, Jefferson and the Orlando Magic agreed to a two-way contract. Jefferson made his NBA debut on December 31, 2018, against the Charlotte Hornets, playing four minutes with two points and one rebound. On July 30, 2019, the Magic re-signed with Jefferson to a two-way contract. On November 1, 2019, the Magic announced that they had re-signed with Jefferson.

Jefferson was waived by the Magic on February 6, 2020.

On February 26, 2020, the Lakeland Magic acquired the returning right to Jefferson from the Iowa Wolves in exchange for the returning right to Braian Angola-Rodas and a first-round draft pick in the 2020 NBA G League Draft.

=== Galatasaray (2020–2021) ===
On December 4, 2020, Jefferson signed an Exhibit 10 contract with the Boston Celtics. The Celtics waived Jefferson on December 19, 2020.

On December 29, 2020, Jefferson signed with Galatasaray of the Turkish Basketball Super League (BSL).

== Coaching career ==
On July 21, 2021, Jefferson was named Director of Player Development for the Duke Blue Devils. In April 2022, he was promoted to assistant coach by head coach Jon Scheyer.

In 2023, Jefferson became an assistant coach for the Boston Celtics under head coach Joe Mazzulla. Jefferson became an NBA champion when the Celtics defeated the Dallas Mavericks in 5 games in the 2024 NBA Finals.

== Career statistics ==
Legend
GP	Games played	GS	Games started	MPG	Minutes per game
FG%	Field goal percentage	3P%	3-point field goal percentage	FT%	Free throw percentage
RPG	Rebounds per game	APG	Assists per game	SPG	Steals per game
BPG	Blocks per game	PPG	Points per game	**Bold**	Career high

=== NBA ===
==== Regular season ====
Year	Team	GP	GS	MPG	FG%	3P%	FT%	RPG	APG	SPG	BPG	PPG
2018–19	Orlando	12	0	**5.7**	**.625**	–	**.875**	**1.8**	**.3**	**.3**	**.3**	**2.3**
2019–20	Orlando	**18**	0	4.1	.357	–	.357	1.3	.2	.1	.2	.8
Career		30	0	4.7	.500	–	.545	1.5	.2	.1	.2	1.4

=== College ===
Year	Team	GP	GS	MPG	FG%	3P%	FT%	RPG	APG	SPG	BPG	PPG
2012–13	Duke	32	7	12.7	.543	–	.610	2.9	.2	.4	.5	4.0
2013–14	Duke	35	26	22.7	.644	–	.494	6.9	1.0	.7	.6	6.5
2014–15	Duke	**39**	26	21.3	.631	–	.554	5.8	.8	.6	.7	6.1
2015–16	Duke	9	9	**30.3**	**.683**	–	.553	**10.3**	1.4	**1.0**	1.1	**11.4**
2016–17	Duke	35	**35**	29.7	.613	–	**.629**	8.4	**1.5**	.7	**1.9**	10.9
Career		150	103	22.3	.620	–	.575	6.3	.9	.6	.9	7.2

== Personal life ==
He is the son of Malcolm Musgrove and Quetta Jefferson. His father played basketball at Delaware State from 1992 to 1994. He has two brothers, Malcolm and Karonn, and four sisters, Amoni, Amesa, Amea and Milan. Jefferson received a Bachelor of Arts (history) and a Masters of Arts in Christian Studies from Duke University on May 13, 2017. On August 5, 2023, Amile married his longtime girlfriend, Chelsea Grain.
