= Providence School =

Providence School of Jacksonville

Location
- 2701 Hodges Boulevard; Jacksonville, Florida; United States; 30°17′52″N 81°27′28″W

Information
- Type: Private, Christian, college preparatory
- Motto: Boldly Christian, Unquestionably Academic
- Religious affiliation: Christian
- Denomination: Non-denominational
- Established: 1997
- Founder: Paul Zink
- Status: open
- Principal: Michael Gray (high school); Cary Brown (middle school); DeShuan Mills (lower school)
- Headmaster: Tim Anderson
- Years: PK-12
- Gender: Co-educational
- Enrollment: 1,200
- Campus: Suburban
- Colors: Black, teal, and white
- Athletics: 54 Athletic teams
- Athletics conference: Florida High School Athletic Association (FHSAA)
- Sports: baseball, basketball, cheerleading, cross country, football, golf, lacrosse, softball, swimming, soccer, track, tennis, volleyball, wrestling, weightlifting
- Mascot: Stallion
- Nickname: Stallions
- Accreditation: ACSI; SACS; FCIS, FKC
- Yearbook: Paragon and Koinonia
- Tuition: $14,140-$17,120 (2024-25)
- Affiliation: New Life Christian Fellowship
- Website: www.prov.org

Providence School of Jacksonville is a private, college preparatory Christian school in Jacksonville, Florida, U.S. It has a preschool, a lower school, a middle school, and a high school, and enrolls about 1,200 students a year. The school is affiliated with the New Life Christian Fellowship, a non-denominational church in Jacksonville, and opened in 1997.

== History ==
Providence School was founded by New Life Christian Fellowship, a non-denominational Christian church in Jacksonville's Southside. The church moved to establish the school when a word of the Lord was given. "You are to start a school that will be high in academics, strong in Biblical teaching, and teach social graces. You are to have excellence in all areas and it is to be up and running in two years." Shortly thereafter, ground was broken for the school. Providence opened for class in the fall of 1997 (less than two years later), and saw its enrollment numbers fill quickly, leading to further plans to accommodate growth.

== Mission statement ==
Providence School prepares its students to be boldly Christian and unquestionably academic servant leaders who change the world.

== Athletics ==
Providence is well known for its talent in athletics and has a wide variety of sports for students at all levels.

Some for men include:

- Baseball State A State Champs 2003, 2A Champs 2008, & 3A Champs 2012
- Basketball State 2A Champs 2010, 2012, 2015
- Cross Country
- Football
- Golf State Contenders 1A
- Soccer State Contenders 2A 2008 State Runners-up
- Swimming State Contenders 1A
- Tennis State Contenders 2A
- Wrestling (No longer sponsored) State Contenders 1A

For women, the sports include:

- Volleyball District Champions 2005-2014 Regional Champions 2014
- Basketball
- Cross Country State Contenders 1A
- Cheerleading FHSAA State Champions 2013, 2021, 2023, 2024. State Runner-up 2015, 2016, 2019. Regional Champions 2013, 2017, 2019, 2020, 2023.
- Golf
- Softball 2008 State Runners-up, District Champs
- Soccer District Champions 2017, 2018, 2019. Class 3A Regional Champions 2022
- Swimming State Contenders 1A
- Tennis State Contenders 2A
- Track and Field State Contenders 1A

== Notable alumni ==
- Grayson Allen, Phoenix Suns basketball player
- Carter Bradley, Las Vegas Raiders football player; played college football for the South Alabama Jaguars
- Caitlin Brunell, Miss Alabama 2014
- Zack Bryant (born 1997), basketball player in the Israeli Basketball Premier League.
- Tyler Callihan, professional baseball player
- Nathan Hickey, professional baseball player
- Walker Lockett, professional baseball player
- Will Mallory, Indianapolis Colts football player
- Patric Young, professional basketball player, ESPN SEC Network Studio Host
