= 2011–12 Duke Blue Devils men's basketball team =

American college basketball season

2011–12 Duke Blue Devils men's basketball

Maui Invitational champions

NCAA tournament, round of 64
- Conference: Atlantic Coast Conference

Ranking
- Coaches: No. 14
- AP: No. 8
- Record: 27–7 (13–3 ACC)
- Head coach: Mike Krzyzewski (32nd season)
- Assistant coaches: Chris Collins; Steve Wojciechowski; Jeff Capel
- Home arena: Cameron Indoor Stadium

2011–12 ACC men's basketball standings
| | Conf. | | | | Overall |
| Team | W | | L | PCT | W | | L | PCT |
|---|---|---|---|---|---|---|---|---|
| No. 6 North Carolina | 14 | – | 2 | .875 | 32 | – | 6 | .842 |
| No. 14 Duke | 13 | – | 3 | .813 | 27 | – | 7 | .794 |
| No. 15 Florida State† | 12 | – | 4 | .750 | 25 | – | 10 | .714 |
| Virginia | 9 | – | 7 | .563 | 22 | – | 10 | .688 |
| No. 20 NC State | 9 | – | 7 | .563 | 24 | – | 13 | .649 |
| Miami (FL) | 9 | – | 7 | .563 | 20 | – | 13 | .606 |
| Clemson | 8 | – | 8 | .500 | 16 | – | 15 | .516 |
| Maryland | 6 | – | 10 | .375 | 17 | – | 15 | .531 |
| Virginia Tech | 4 | – | 12 | .250 | 16 | – | 17 | .485 |
| Wake Forest | 4 | – | 12 | .250 | 13 | – | 18 | .419 |
| Georgia Tech | 4 | – | 12 | .250 | 11 | – | 20 | .355 |
| Boston College | 4 | – | 12 | .250 | 9 | – | 22 | .290 |
† 2012 ACC tournament winner As of April 3, 2012; Rankings from Coaches Poll

The 2011–12 Duke Blue Devils men's basketball team represented Duke University in the 2011–12 NCAA Division I men's basketball season. Returning as head coach was Hall of Famer Mike Krzyzewski. The team played its home games at Cameron Indoor Stadium in Durham, North Carolina as members of the Atlantic Coast Conference. They ended the season with 27–7 overall record, 13–3 in ACC play, finishing in 2nd place. In the 2012 ACC men's basketball tournament they reached the semifinals, when they were defeated by eventual champs Florida State. They earned a #2 seed in the 2012 NCAA Division I men's basketball tournament, but lost to #15 seed Lehigh in the round of 64.

== Previous season ==
Following the 2009–2010 basketball team, the 2010–11 Duke Blue Devils men's basketball team began the season ranked #1 in the nation and held that title for the first nine weeks of the season going 15–0, until being defeated for the first time on January 12 again Florida State. The only non-conference loss during the regular season came again St. John's weeks later. Duke split the two regular season match ups within state archrival North Carolina, who would eventually clinch the ACC regular season championship against Duke in the last game of the season, a 81–67 Duke loss. However, Duke would beat North Carolina in the ACC tournament, which allowed Duke to take the conference tournament title and go 2–1 against the Tar Heels on the season. Duke would end up a #1 seed in the NCAA tournament, defeating Hampton and Michigan in the first two rounds of the tournament, and eventually lost to the Arizona Wildcats in the Sweet Sixteen, ending Duke's bid for a second straight championship, ending the season with an overall 32–5 record.

== Class of 2011 signees ==
College recruiting
| Name | Hometown | School | Height | Weight | Commit date |
|---|---|---|---|---|---|
| Quinn Cook; PG | Hyattsville, MD | Oak Hill Academy | 6 ft 0 in (1.83 m) | 180 lb (82 kg) | Nov 12, 2010 |
| Quinn Cook; PG | Recruit ratings: Scout: Rivals: 247Sports: ESPN: | | | | |
| Michael Gbinije; SF | Chester, VA | Benedictine | 6 ft 7 in (2.01 m) | 194 lb (88 kg) | Nov 12, 2010 |
| Michael Gbinije; SF | Recruit ratings: Scout: Rivals: 247Sports: ESPN: | | | | |
| Alex Murphy; SF | South Kingstown, RI | South Kingstown | 6 ft 8 in (2.03 m) | 215 lb (98 kg) | May 5, 2011 |
| Alex Murphy; SF | Recruit ratings: Scout: Rivals: 247Sports: ESPN: | | | | |
| Marshall Plumlee; C | Warsaw, IN | Christ School | 6 ft 11 in (2.11 m) | 215 lb (98 kg) | Nov 12, 2010 |
| Marshall Plumlee; C | Recruit ratings: Scout: Rivals: 247Sports: ESPN: | | | | |
| Austin Rivers; SG | Winter Park, FL | Winter Park | 6 ft 4 in (1.93 m) | 189 lb (86 kg) | Nov 12, 2010 |
| Austin Rivers; SG | Recruit ratings: Scout: Rivals: 247Sports: ESPN: | | | | |
Overall recruit ranking: Scout: 8 Rivals: 10 247Sports: 2 ESPN: 6
Note: In many cases, Scout, Rivals, 247Sports, On3, and ESPN may conflict in their listings of height and weight.; In these cases, the average was taken. ESPN grades are on a 100-point scale.; Sources: "Duke Basketball Commitment List". Rivals.; "2011 Duke Basketball Commits". Scout.; "ESPN". ESPN.; "Scout.com Team Recruiting Rankings". Scout.; "2011 Team Ranking". Rivals.

== Roster ==
2011–12 Duke Blue Devils men's basketball team
Players
Coaches

| Pos. | # | Name | Height | Weight | Year | Previous school | Hometown |
|---|---|---|---|---|---|---|---|
| G | 0 | Austin Rivers | 6 ft 4 in (1.93 m) | 200 lb (91 kg) | Fr | Winter Park | Winter Park, FL |
| G | 2 | Quinn Cook | 6 ft 0 in (1.83 m) | 175 lb (79 kg) | Fr | Oak Hill Academy | Bowie, MD |
| G | 3 | Tyler Thornton | 6 ft 1 in (1.85 m) | 195 lb (88 kg) | So | Gonzaga | Washington, D.C. |
| F | 5 | Mason Plumlee | 6 ft 11 in (2.11 m) | 235 lb (107 kg) | Jr | Christ School | Warsaw, IN |
| F | 12 | Alex Murphy | 6 ft 8 in (2.03 m) | 220 lb (100 kg) | Fr | South Kingstown | Wakefield, RI |
| G | 13 | Michael Gbinije | 6 ft 7 in (2.01 m) | 205 lb (93 kg) | Fr | Benedictine | Chester, VA |
| F | 15 | Josh Hairston | 6 ft 7 in (2.01 m) | 235 lb (107 kg) | So | Montrose Christian | Fredericksburg, VA |
| G | 20 | Andre Dawkins | 6 ft 4 in (1.93 m) | 200 lb (91 kg) | Jr | Atlantic Shores Christian | Chesapeake, VA |
| C | 21 | Miles Plumlee | 6 ft 11 in (2.11 m) | 245 lb (111 kg) | Sr | Christ School | Warsaw, IN |
| G | 30 | Seth Curry | 6 ft 2 in (1.88 m) | 180 lb (82 kg) | Jr | Charlotte Christian | Charlotte, NC |
| F | 34 | Ryan Kelly | 6 ft 11 in (2.11 m) | 230 lb (104 kg) | Jr | Ravenscroft | Raleigh, NC |
| C | 40 | Marshall Plumlee | 7 ft 1 in (2.16 m) | 240 lb (109 kg) | Fr | Christ School | Warsaw, IN |
| F | 52 | Todd Zafirovski | 6 ft 9 in (2.06 m) | 240 lb (109 kg) | Jr | Lake Forest Academy | Lake Forest, IL |

Head coach

- Mike Krzyzewski

Assistant coach(es)

- Chris Collins
- Steve Wojciechowski
- Jeff Capel

Legend

- (C) Team captain
- (S) Suspended
- (I) Ineligible
- (W) Walk-on
- Injured
- Current redshirt

== Season summary ==
After a series of victories in exhibition games overseas in China and Dubai, Duke returned to Durham and kicked off the season with home victories over two foes. The team then traveled to New York City's Madison Square Garden to face Michigan State in the Champions Classic. Duke's five-point victory was Mike Krzyzewski's 903rd win of his career, placing him atop the list of the winningest coaches in Division I history. Coach K surpassed his former coach and mentor, Bob Knight, as Knight watched courtside while doing the color commentary for ESPN.

Duke's squad next participated in the Maui Invitational, and defeated two ranked opponents in #15 Michigan and Big 12 favorite and 14th ranked Kansas in the semifinals and championship, respectively. Tyler Thornton hit two key three-pointers with less than a minute and half to secure the 7-point victory in the championship game. Ryan Kelly was named MVP of the tournament for his performance, including 17 points against Kansas. As part of the ACC-Big Ten Challenge, Duke traveled to Columbus, Ohio in its first true road test of the season to face Big Ten favorite and #2 ranked Ohio State. OSU roared out to an 11–0 lead and never relinquished, ending up routing Duke by 22 points.

Duke returned home and earned another win before heading to Madison Square Garden again to defeat the Washington Huskies. The team then rattled off a few more victories before facing another challenging road battle in Philadelphia against the Temple Owls. The game was a back-and-forth affair, but Khalif Wyatt of Temple made two key 3s in leading his team to the five-point victory.

The ACC season began with Duke earning four victories, including against #16 Virginia. However, their ACC winning streak was snapped by Florida State when Michael Snaer hit a buzzer beating three-pointer to stun the Duke home crowd. After victories over Maryland, St. John's, and Virginia Tech, Duke again lost at home to Miami in overtime by 4 after going 0–6 from the free throw stripe in the extra session. Duke was in a second-place tie in the league standings with FSU.

That set up a showdown with league-leading and fifth ranked North Carolina. Carolina came in as a heavy favorite in the rivalry game, but the Blue Devils stuck with the Tar Heels for most of the game behind a barrage of three-pointers. Tyler Zeller of Carolina dominated the first half with his shooting and rebounding, but the Tar Heels only secured a 3-point lead going into the intermission. Carolina then extended their lead to 10 with about 3 minutes remaining, which set up a furious comeback rally by the gritty Devils.

Duke hit 14 threes in the game and Austin Rivers led the effort with 29 points. Tyler Thornton began the comeback with a 3 with about two minutes remaining. Ryan Kelly also chipped in with a baseline jumper late, and the Tar Heels couldn't seal the victory as they missed key free throws in the closing moments. The Blue Devils trailed by three when Zeller accidentally tipped in an errant three-point attempt by Duke, which put Duke within 1. Zeller made a free throw on the other end and Duke had 13.9 seconds left to draw up a play. After a screen on Rivers' defender, Zeller made the defensive switch and Rivers sank a long-range three over the outstretched arms of the 7-footer as time expired. The Rivers' shot is yet another performance to be added to the rivalry's lore and the buzzer beating play has been viewed by nearly 2 million people on YouTube.

Following the emotional high from the comeback victory against Duke's chief rival, the squad did not let up, reeling off 6 straight victories against ACC opponents. This streak included the largest second-half comeback victory in Coach K's tenure when the NC State Wolfpack held a 16-point lead going into intermission. They extended the lead to 20 with 11 1/2 minutes remaining in the game, but Duke rallied back and ended up with a 5-point victory. The team also had a road test at Florida State and came away with an impressive revenge victory to bring them back to the top of the ACC standings. That set up another season-ending showdown with North Carolina with the regular season ACC championship and #1 seed in the ACC tournament on the line. In front a home crowd and senior night, the Devils came out trailing and the Tar Heels made a statement in a game in which they never trailed. Duke got to within 11 in the second half, but it ended as an 18-point thumping at the hands of Duke's rival. Duke earned the #2 seed in the ACC tournament.

As the Blue Devils prepared for the ACC tournament in nearby Greensboro, Duke's third leading scorer and rebounder as well as the highest percentage shooter from 3-point land, Ryan Kelly, suffered what was reported as a sprained foot. With Kelly out of the lineup, Duke went small as they narrowly defeated the pesky Virginia Tech Hokies in the second round after receiving a bye.

That set up the rubber match with Florida State with a trip to the championship game on the line. Florida State build a double digit lead on Duke in the second half, but Duke fought back, bringing the status of the game into question. Rivers layup with 42 seconds remaining brought the Devils to within 1. However, the Seminoles responded with points of their own and Rivers badly missed a long three-pointer with 6 seconds remaining. The Devils corralled the rebound after a loose ball scramble ended up in the hands of Curry, but he could only manage a desperation heave that rimmed out as time expired, securing the 3-point victory for Florida State. The Seminoles went on to defeat North Carolina for the ACC championship the next day.

Duke earned a #2 seed in the South Regional in the 2012 NCAA Division I men's basketball tournament with the overall #1 seed and tournament favorite Kentucky at the top of the region, exactly 20 years after the famous buzzer beating shot by Christian Laettner against Kentucky in the Elite 8. Kelly continued to be listed as day to day and Duke was matched up with Lehigh from the Patriot League in the round of 64. The Devils were favored by 12.5 points in the matchup, but Lehigh looked to be the better team that night.

NBA prospect C.J. McCollum lit up the Devils for 30 points in leading the Mountain Hawks to a 5-point upset victory, while the Devils struggled mightily from 3-point land going 6 for 26. It was the second 15 seed that defeated a 2 seed that day as Missouri also fell victim to the upset bug after it had only happened four times previously in history. Kelly did not make an appearance in the matchup and shortly thereafter had surgery and was sidelined for 6–8 weeks. The loss resulted in a disappointing finish for the Duke squad after a successful season, which included the comeback victory against North Carolina (who earned a #1 seed in the tournament) and wins versus #1 seed and Big Ten Champion Michigan State and #2 seed and Big 12 regular season champion Kansas in the championship of the Maui Invitational.

== Schedule ==
| Date time, TV | Rank^{#} | Opponent^{#} | Result | Record | High points | High rebounds | High assists | Site (attendance) city, state |
Exhibition
| October 29*; 7:00 p.m. | No. 6 | Bellarmine | W 87–62 | – | – | – | – | Cameron Indoor Stadium (9,314); Durham, NC |
| November 2*; 7:00 p.m. | No. 6 | Shaw | W 80–66 | – | – | – | – | Cameron Indoor Stadium (9,314); Durham, NC |
Regular season
| November 11*; 9:00 p.m., ESPNU | No. 6 | Belmont; Maui Invitational tournament | W 77–76 | 1–0 | 16 – Tied | 14 – Ma. Plumlee | 6 – Ma. Plumlee | Cameron Indoor Stadium (9,314); Durham, NC |
| November 12*; 4:30 p.m., ESPNU | No. 6 | Presbyterian | W 96–55 | 2–0 | 17 – Kelly | 11 – Mi. Plumlee | 6 – Rivers | Cameron Indoor Stadium (9,314); Durham, NC |
| November 15*; 7:00 p.m., ESPN | No. 6 | vs. Michigan State; Champions Classic | W 74–69 | 3–0 | 26 – Dawkins | 7 – Curry | 4 – Curry | Madison Square Garden (19,979); New York, NY |
| November 18*; 6:00 p.m., ESPNU | No. 6 | Davidson | W 82–69 | 4–0 | 17 – Tied | 13 – Ma. Plumlee | 3 – Tied | Cameron Indoor Stadium (9,314); Durham, NC |
| November 21*; 5:30 p.m., ESPN2 | No. 6 | vs. Tennessee; Maui Invitational – Quarterfinals | W 77-67 | 5–0 | 18 – Rivers | 13 – Ma. Plumlee | 4 – Curry | Lahaina Civic Center (2,400); Maui, HI |
| November 22*; 7:00 p.m., ESPN | No. 6 | vs. No. 15 Michigan; Maui Invitational – Semifinals | W 82–75 | 6–0 | 20 – Rivers | 5 – Tied | 3 – Tied | Lahaina Civic Center (2,400); Maui, HI |
| November 23*; 10:00 p.m., ESPN | No. 6 | vs. No. 14 Kansas; Maui Invitational – Championship | W 68–61 | 7–0 | 17 – Tied | 12 – Ma. Plumlee | 3 – Tied | Lahaina Civic Center (2,400); Maui, HI |
| November 29*; 9:30 p.m., ESPN | No. 3 | at No. 2 Ohio State; ACC–Big Ten Challenge | L 63–85 | 7–1 | 22 – Rivers | 8 – Ma. Plumlee | 4 – Cook | Value City Arena (18,809); Columbus, OH |
| December 7*; 7:00 p.m., ESPN2 | No. 7 | Colorado State | W 87–64 | 8–1 | 17 – Rivers | 10 – Ma. Plumlee | 8 – Curry | Cameron Indoor Stadium (9,314); Durham, NC |
| December 10*; 12:00 p.m., CBS | No. 7 | vs. Washington | W 86–80 | 9–1 | 18 – Rivers | 9 – Ma. Plumlee | 3 – Tied | Madison Square Garden (15,525); New York, NY |
| December 19*; 7:00 p.m., ESPN3 | No. 7 | UNC Greensboro | W 90–63 | 10–1 | 15 – Ma. Plumlee | 13 – Tied | 2 – Tied | Cameron Indoor Stadium (9,314); Durham, NC |
| December 30*; 7:00 p.m., ESPN2 | No. 7 | Western Michigan | W 110–70 | 11–1 | 15 – Ma. Plumlee | 13 – Ma. Plumlee | 2 – Tied | Cameron Indoor Stadium (9,314); Durham, NC |
| January 1*; 5:00 p.m., ESPNU | No. 7 | Penn | W 85–55 | 12–1 | 18 – Kelly | 14 – Ma. Plumlee | 9 – Cook | Cameron Indoor Stadium (9,314); Durham, NC |
| January 4*; 7:00 p.m., ESPN2 | No. 5 | vs. Temple | L 73–78 | 12–2 | 17 – Mi. Plumlee | 13 – Ma. Plumlee | 4 – Ma. Plumlee | Wells Fargo Center (20,420); Philadelphia, PA |
| January 7; 12:00 p.m., ESPNU | No. 5 | at Georgia Tech | W 81–74 | 13–2 (1–0) | 21 – Kelly | 8 – Ma. Plumlee | 5 – Cook | Philips Arena (9,277); Atlanta, GA |
| January 12; 9:00 p.m., ESPN | No. 8 | No. 16 Virginia | W 61–58 | 14–2 (2–0) | 12 – Ma. Plumlee | 7 – Tied | 3 – Thornton | Cameron Indoor Stadium (9,314); Durham, NC |
| January 15; 6:00 p.m., ESPNU | No. 8 | at Clemson | W 73–66 | 15–2 (3–0) | 24 – Dawkins | 14 – Mi. Plumlee | 2 – Tied | Littlejohn Coliseum (10,000); Clemson, SC |
| January 19; 7:00 p.m., ESPN | No. 4 | Wake Forest | W 91–73 | 16–2 (4–0) | 21 – Dawkins | 10 – Kelly | 8 – Thornton | Cameron Indoor Stadium (9,314); Durham, NC |
| January 21; 4:00 p.m., ESPN | No. 4 | Florida State | L 73–76 | 16–3 (4–1) | 19 – Rivers | 8 – Mi. Plumlee | 4 – Thornton | Cameron Indoor Stadium (9,314); Durham, NC |
| January 25; 9:00 p.m., ESPN | No. 8 | at Maryland; Duke–Maryland rivalry | W 74–61 | 17–3 (5–1) | 23 – Ma. Plumlee | 12 – Ma. Plumlee | 4 – Ma. Plumlee | Comcast Center (17,950); College Park, MD |
| January 28*; 12:00 p.m., ESPN | No. 8 | St. John's | W 83–76 | 18–3 (5–1) | 16 – Kelly | 17 – Ma. Plumlee | 5 – Rivers | Cameron Indoor Stadium (9,314); Durham, NC |
| February 2; 7:00 p.m., ESPN | No. 7 | at Virginia Tech | W 75–60 | 19–3 (6–1) | 18 – Rivers | 6 – Ma. Plumlee | 5 – Rivers | Cassell Coliseum (9,847); Blacksburg, VA |
| February 5; 3:00 p.m., ESPNU | No. 7 | Miami | L 74–78 ^{OT} | 19–4 (6–2) | 22 – Curry | 13 – Ma. Plumlee | 4 – Tied | Cameron Indoor Stadium (9,314); Durham, NC |
| February 8; 9:00 p.m., ESPN | No. 9 | at No. 5 North Carolina; Carolina–Duke rivalry | W 85–84 | 20–4 (7–2) | 29 – Rivers | 14 – Ma. Plumlee | 3 – Thornton | Dean E. Smith Center (21,750); Chapel Hill, NC |
| February 11; 4:00 p.m., ESPN | No. 9 | Maryland; Duke–Maryland rivalry | W 73–55 | 21–4 (8–2) | 19 – Curry | 22 – Mi. Plumlee | 4 – Rivers | Cameron Indoor Stadium (9,314); Durham, NC |
| February 16; 9:00 p.m., ACC Network | No. 5 | NC State | W 78–73 | 22–4 (9–2) | 26 – Curry | 10 – Ma. Plumlee | 3 – Thornton | Cameron Indoor Stadium (9,314); Durham, NC |
| February 19; 6:00 p.m., ESPNU | No. 5 | at Boston College | W 75–50 | 23–4 (10–2) | 18 – Curry | 10 – Mi. Plumlee | 3 – Tied | Conte Forum (8,606); Chestnut Hill, MA |
| February 23; 7:00 p.m., ESPN | No. 5 | at No. 15 Florida State | W 74–66 | 24–4 (11–2) | 22 – Dawkins | 8 – Mi. Plumlee | 4 – Rivers | Donald L. Tucker Center (12,100); Tallahassee, FL |
| February 25; 12:00 p.m., ACC Network | No. 5 | Virginia Tech | W 70–65 ^{OT} | 25–4 (12–2) | 23 – Rivers | 15 – Mi. Plumlee | 3 – Thornton | Cameron Indoor Stadium (9,314); Durham, NC |
| February 28; 9:00 p.m., ESPNU | No. 3 | at Wake Forest | W 79–71 | 26–4 (13–2) | 23 – Kelly | 11 – Mi. Plumlee | 3 – Cook | LJVM Coliseum (11,917); Winston-Salem, NC |
| March 3; 7:00 p.m., ESPN | No. 3 | No. 6 North Carolina; Carolina–Duke rivalry and ESPN College GameDay | L 70–88 | 26–5 (13–3) | 17 – Ma. Plumlee | 11 – Mi. Plumlee | 3 – Tied | Cameron Indoor Stadium (9,314); Durham, NC |
ACC Tournament
| March 9; 7:00 p.m., ESPN2/ACC Network | (2) No. 5 | (10) Virginia Tech; Quarterfinals | W 60–56 | 27–5 | 17 – Rivers | 10 – Ma. Plumlee | 5 – Curry | Philips Arena (19,520); Atlanta, GA |
| March 10; 3:00 p.m., ESPN/ACC Network | (2) No. 5 | (3) No. 17 Florida State; Semifinals | L 59–62 | 27–6 | 17 – Rivers | 11 – Mi. Plumlee | 2 – Curry | Philips Arena (19,520); Atlanta, GA |
NCAA tournament
| March 16*; 7:15 p.m., CBS | (2 S) No. 8 | vs. (15 S) Lehigh; Second Round | L 70–75 | 27–7 | 19 – Tied | 12 – Ma. Plumlee | 6 – Thornton | Greenboro Coliseum (16,523); Greensboro, NC |
*Non-conference game. ^{#}Rankings from AP. (#) Tournament seedings in parentheses. All times are in Eastern Time. (#) during NCAA Tournament is seed with Region.

== Rankings ==
Ranking movements Legend: ██ Increase in ranking ██ Decrease in ranking ( ) = First-place votes
| | Week | | | | | | | | | | | | | | | | | | | |
| Poll | Pre | 1 | 2 | 3 | 4 | 5 | 6 | 7 | 8 | 9 | 10 | 11 | 12 | 13 | 14 | 15 | 16 | 17 | 18 | Final |
|---|---|---|---|---|---|---|---|---|---|---|---|---|---|---|---|---|---|---|---|---|
| AP | 6 | 6 | 6 | 3 (2) | 7 | 7 | 7 | 7 | 5 | 8 | 4 | 8 | 7 | 10 | 5 | 5 | 4 | 6 | 8 | Not released |
| Coaches | 6 | 6 | 6 | 4 | 5 | 5 | 5 | 5 | 3 | 6 | 4 | 6 | 5 | 9 | 4 | 4 | 3 | 6 | 8 | 14 |

*AP does not release post-NCAA tournament rankings.
Coaches did not release a Week 2 poll at the same time the AP did.
