= Donald Griffin (disambiguation) =

Donald Griffin (1915–2003) was an American professor of zoology.

Donald Griffin may also refer to:

- Donald C. Griffin (1942–2025), American physicist
- Don Griffin (born 1964), American football player
- Don Griffin (halfback) (born 1922), American football player
