= Doc Rivers =

American basketball coach and player (born 1961)

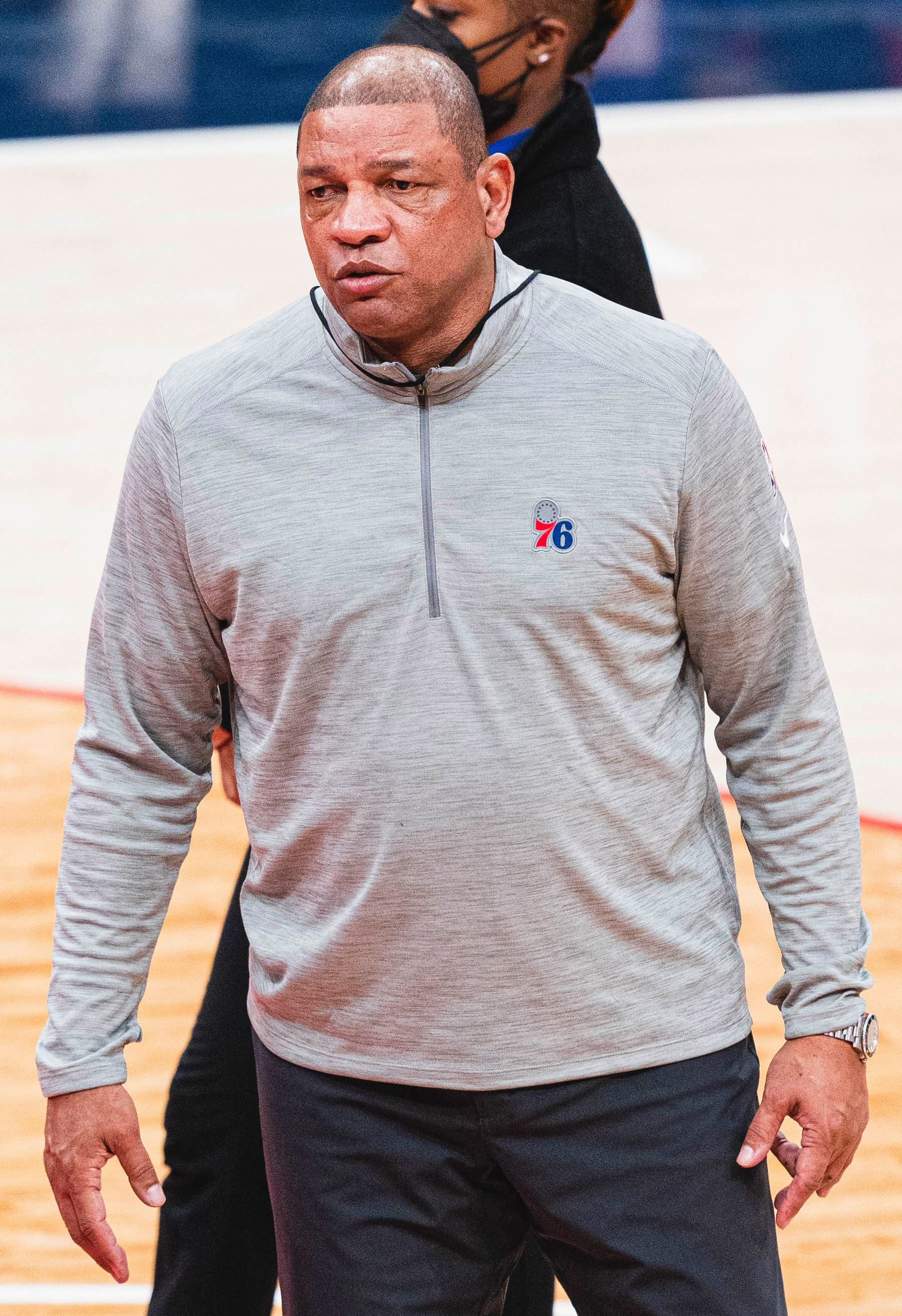
- Rivers coaching the Philadelphia 76ers in 2022

Personal information
- Born: October 13, 1961 (age 65) Chicago, Illinois, U.S.
- Listed height: 6 ft 4 in (1.93 m)
- Listed weight: 210 lb (95 kg)

Career information
- High school: Proviso East (Maywood, Illinois)
- College: Marquette (1980–1983)
- NBA draft: 1983: 2nd round, 31st overall pick
- Drafted by: Atlanta Hawks
- Playing career: 1983–1996
- Position: Point guard
- Number: 25
- Coaching career: 1999–2026

Career history

Playing
- 1983–1991: Atlanta Hawks
- 1991–1992: Los Angeles Clippers
- 1992–1994: New York Knicks
- 1994–1996: San Antonio Spurs

Coaching
- 1999–2003: Orlando Magic
- 2004–2013: Boston Celtics
- 2013–2020: Los Angeles Clippers
- 2020–2023: Philadelphia 76ers
- 2024–2026: Milwaukee Bucks

Career highlights
- As player: NBA All-Star (1988); No. 31 retired by Marquette Golden Eagles; FIBA World Cup MVP (1982); USA Basketball Male Athlete of the Year (1982); Mr. Basketball USA (1980); First-team Parade All-American (1980); McDonald's All-American (1980); As coach: NBA champion (2008); NBA Cup champion (2024); NBA Coach of the Year (2000); 4× NBA All-Star Game head coach (2008, 2011, 2021, 2024); Top 15 Coaches in NBA History

Career NBA statistics
- Points: 9,377 (10.9 ppg)
- Assists: 4,889 (5.7 apg)
- Steals: 1,563 (1.8 spg)
- Stats at NBA.com
- Stats at Basketball Reference
- Basketball Hall of Fame

Glenn Anton "Doc" Rivers (born October 13, 1961) is an American former professional basketball player and coach in the National Basketball Association (NBA). An NBA player for 14 seasons, he was an NBA All-Star and was named one of the 15 Greatest Coaches in NBA History.

Rivers played college basketball for the Marquette Golden Eagles and was selected by the Atlanta Hawks in the second round of the 1983 NBA draft. He played point guard for the Hawks from 1983 to 1991 and was later a member of the Los Angeles Clippers, New York Knicks, and San Antonio Spurs. Rivers was an All-Star with the Hawks in 1988.

After retiring as a player in 1996, Rivers called games for the NBA on TNT. Rivers began his NBA coaching career in 1999. He was the head coach of the Orlando Magic from 1999 to 2003, the Boston Celtics from 2004 to 2013, the Los Angeles Clippers from 2013 to 2020, the Philadelphia 76ers from 2020 to 2023, and the Milwaukee Bucks from 2024 to 2026. Rivers was named the 2000 NBA Coach of the Year in his first season with the Magic and won an NBA championship with the Celtics in 2008. He was also an analyst for ESPN.

In April 2026, he was announced as a coaching inductee to the Naismith Basketball Hall of Fame and formally entered the Hall that August.

== Playing career ==
=== High school and college career ===
Rivers was a McDonald's All-American for Proviso East High School in the Chicago metropolitan area. He was given his nickname while attending a summer basketball camp at Marquette University while wearing a "Dr. J" t-shirt of Philadelphia 76ers player Julius Erving. Rivers has alternated on whether the nickname originated from Golden Eagles head coach Al McGuire or assistant Rick Majerus.

Rivers later played college ball for Marquette. After his third season at Marquette, Rivers was drafted in the second round (31st overall) of the 1983 NBA draft by the Atlanta Hawks. He graduated from Marquette by completing course work while he was an active NBA player.

=== Professional career ===
After three seasons at Marquette, Rivers entered the NBA draft and was a second-round choice of the Atlanta Hawks. Rivers played point guard for the Atlanta Hawks from 1983 to 1991, assisting star Dominique Wilkins as the team found great regular season success. Rivers' first NBA start was against Julius Erving (Dr. J), who referred to Rivers as "Doc" and "made [him] feel like a million bucks".

On March 4, 1986, Rivers recorded a career-high 21 assists in a game against the Philadelphia 76ers. He averaged a double-double for the 1986–87 season with 12.8 points and 10.0 assists per game. In 1988, Rivers played in the NBA All-Star Game. He received the J. Walter Kennedy Citizenship Award in 1990. After eight seasons with the Hawks, Rivers remains their all-time leader in assists with 3,866.

Rivers later spent one year as a starter for the Los Angeles Clippers (1991–1992), two years playing for the New York Knicks (1992–1994), and two years playing for the San Antonio Spurs (1994–1996). Rivers retired after the 1996 season. During his professional career, Rivers would go on to play 864 regular-season games in which he averaged 10.9 points, 5.7 assists, and 3 rebounds per game.

=== National team career ===
Rivers played for the United States national team during the 1982 FIBA World Championship in Colombia. He was named the tournaments MVP after leading the United States to the gold medal game where they lost against the Soviet Union, 95-94, after Rivers' eight-foot jumper at the buzzer rimmed out.

== Coaching career ==
=== Orlando Magic (1999–2003) ===
Rivers began his coaching career with the Orlando Magic in 1999, where he coached for more than four NBA seasons. Rivers won the Coach of the Year award in 2000 after his first year with the Magic. Despite having been picked to finish last in that year's standings, Rivers led the Magic close to a playoff berth.

During the Magic's free agency spending spree in the summer of 2000, Rivers tried to assemble a "Big Three" team in the NBA. The Magic were courting free agent Tim Duncan, who came close to signing with the Magic and teaming up with fellow stars Grant Hill and Tracy McGrady. However, Duncan re-signed with the San Antonio Spurs due to Rivers' strict policy of family members not being allowed to travel on the team's plane.

The Magic made the postseason in Rivers's next three years as head coach, but he was fired in 2003 after a 1–10 start to the season.

=== Boston Celtics (2004–2013) ===
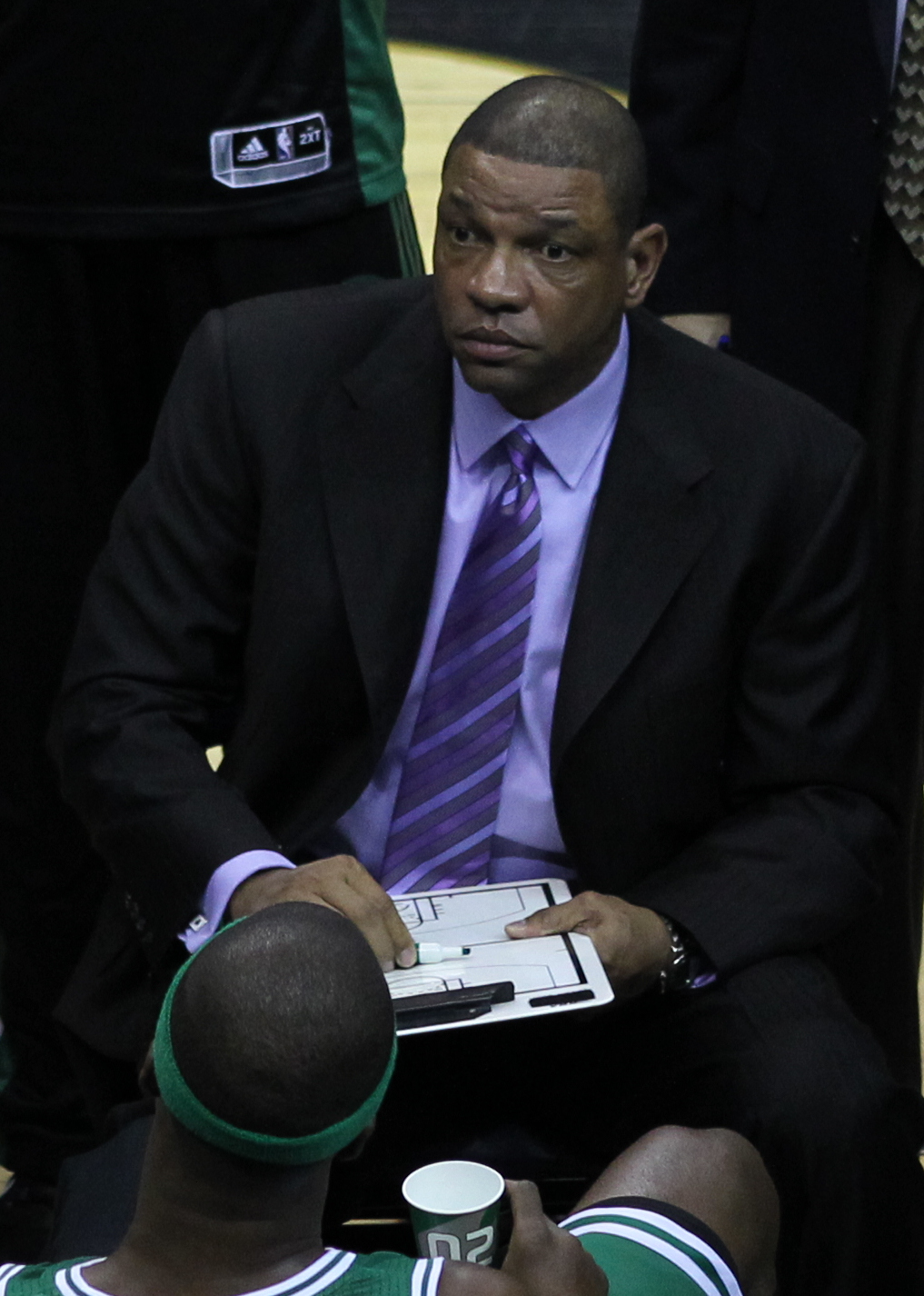
Rivers in 2011

After spending a year working as a commentator for the NBA on ABC (calling the 2004 Finals with Al Michaels), he was hired by the Boston Celtics as their head coach in 2004. During his first years with the Celtics, he was criticized by many in the media for his coaching style, most vociferously by Bill Simmons, who in 2006 publicly called for Rivers to be fired in his columns.

As a result of the Celtics' 109–93 victory over the New York Knicks on January 21, 2008, Rivers, as the coach of the team with the best winning percentage in the Eastern Conference, earned the honor to coach the East for the 2008 NBA All-Star Game in New Orleans.

On June 17, 2008, Rivers won his first and sole NBA Championship as a head coach after defeating the Los Angeles Lakers in six games. The Celtics needed an NBA record 26 postseason games to win it. Rivers played for the team that held the previous record for most games played in a single postseason when the New York Knicks played in 25 postseason games during 1994.

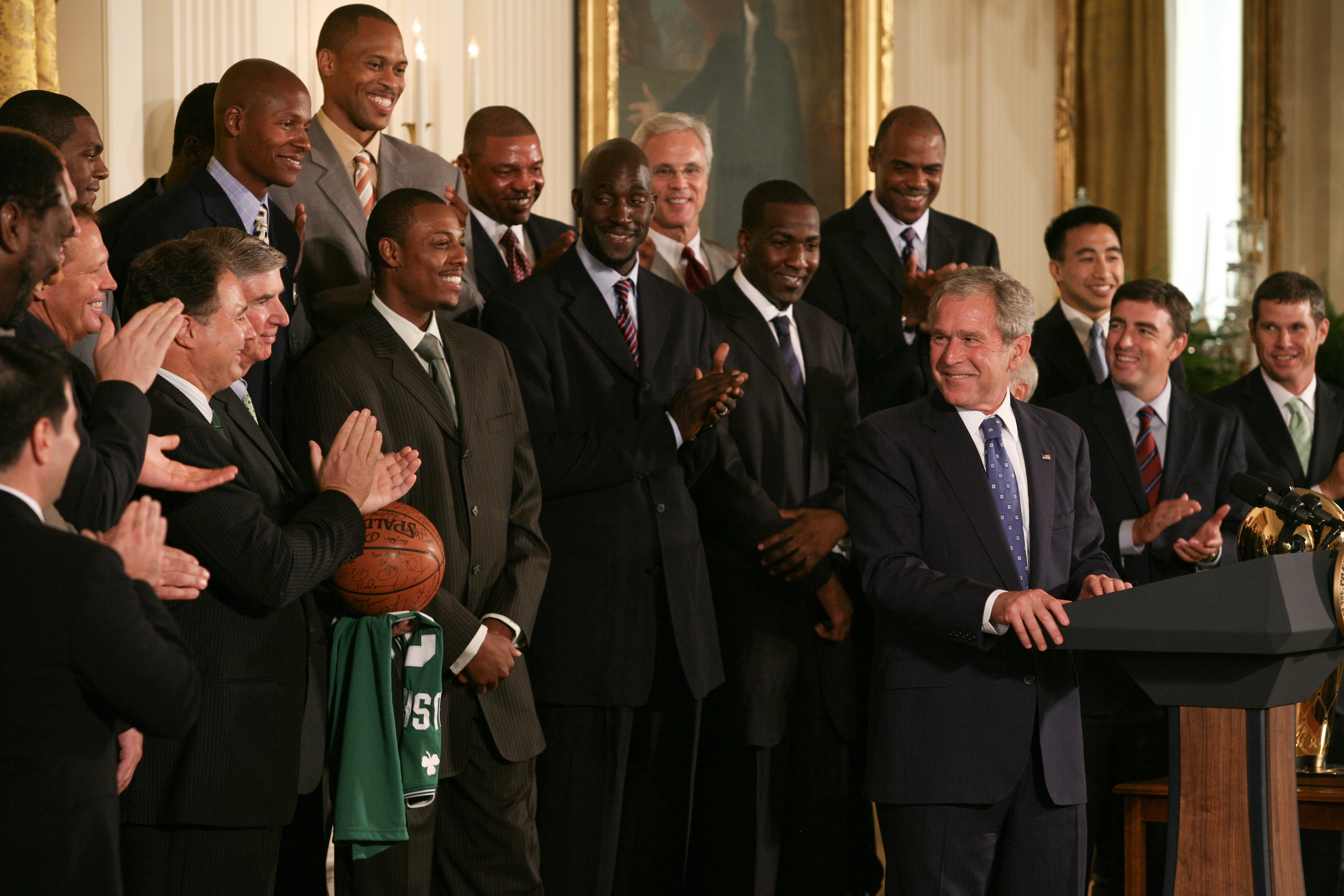
Rivers and the 2008 NBA champion Boston Celtics with President George W. Bush at the White House

Rivers led the Celtics to the 2010 NBA Finals, where they once again faced the Los Angeles Lakers, this time losing the series in seven games. After deliberating between staying on the job or returning to Orlando in order to spend more time with his family, Rivers finally decided that he would honor the last year of his contract and return for the 2010–11 season.

On May 13, 2011, after months of rumors that he would retire, ESPN reported that the Celtics and Rivers had agreed upon a 5-year contract extension worth $35 million. On February 6, 2013, Rivers notched his 400th win with the Celtics in a 99–95 victory over the Toronto Raptors.

=== Los Angeles Clippers (2013–2020) ===
On June 25, 2013, the Los Angeles Clippers acquired Rivers from the Celtics for an unprotected 2015 NBA first-round draft pick. He also became the senior vice president of basketball operations on the team. In his first season as their head coach, Rivers led the Clippers to a franchise-record 57 wins, garnering the 3rd seed in the Western conference. The 2014 NBA playoffs first round playoff series against the Golden State Warriors was marred when TMZ released an audiotape containing racially insensitive remarks made by the then-Clippers owner Donald Sterling. Though there was a possibility of the Clippers boycotting the series, they instead played on, instead holding a silent protest by leaving their shooting jerseys at center court and obscuring the Clippers logo on their warm-up shirts. Rivers himself stated that he would not return to the Clippers if Sterling remained as owner the following season. NBA commissioner Adam Silver responded to the controversy by banning Sterling from the NBA for life and compelling him to sell the team. The team was sold to Microsoft CEO Steve Ballmer for $2 billion on August 12, 2014, and Rivers remained with the Clippers.

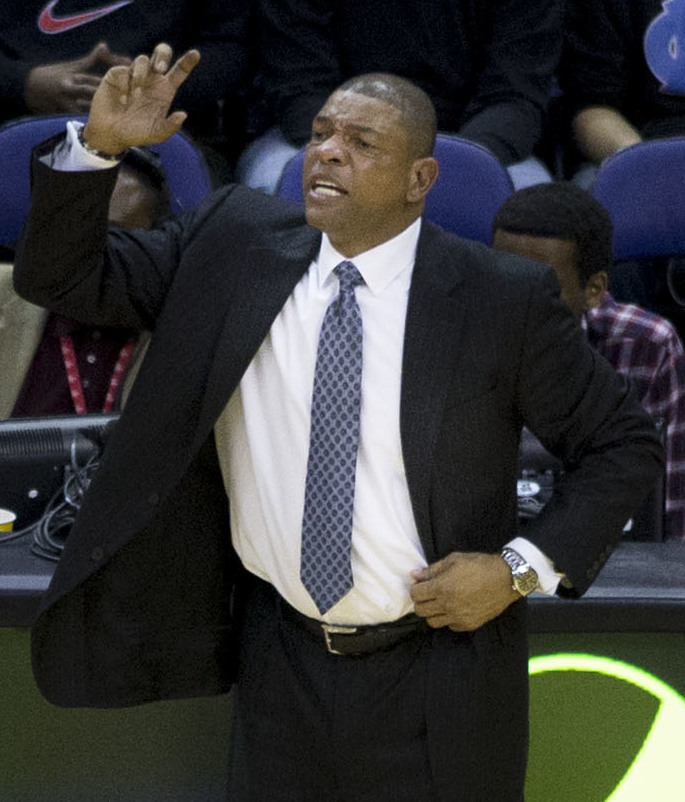
Rivers in 2013

On June 16, 2014, the Clippers promoted Rivers to president of basketball operations in conjunction with his continuing head coaching duties. Although Dave Wohl was hired as general manager, Rivers had the final say in basketball matters. On August 27, 2014, he signed a new five-year contract with the Clippers.

On January 16, 2015, Rivers became the first NBA coach to coach his own son, Austin Rivers, until June 26, 2018, when Austin Rivers was traded to the Washington Wizards for Marcin Gortat.

On August 4, 2017, Rivers gave up his post as president of basketball operations. However, he continued to split responsibility for basketball matters with executive vice president of basketball operations Lawrence Frank. On May 23, 2018, Rivers and the Clippers agreed to a contract extension.

On May 31, 2019, Rivers made comments on Kawhi Leonard during an appearance on ESPN, stating that "He is the most like [Michael] Jordan that we've seen", while Leonard was still under contract to the Toronto Raptors. The Clippers were fined $50,000 due to Rivers' comments in violation of the league's anti-tampering rule. The Clippers signed Leonard to a three-year contract on July 10, 2019.

In the 2019–20 season, Rivers earned his 900th win as a head coach after the Clippers won at home against the Portland Trail Blazers on November 8, 2019. In the Western Conference semifinals, the Clippers jumped to a 3 games to 1 lead before losing the last three of the best-of-seven series to the Denver Nuggets. Rivers became the first coach in NBA history to have three teams fail to advance from a best-of-seven series after taking a 3 games to 1 lead. He had previously been the only coach in NBA history whose teams had twice failed to advance from a best of seven series after taking a 3–1 lead.

On September 28, 2020, Rivers stepped down following the Clippers' defeat to the Nuggets in the conference semifinals. His record through seven seasons with the team was 356–208, but he was ultimately unable to lead the Clippers to their first conference finals appearance in franchise history.

=== Philadelphia 76ers (2020–2023) ===
On October 3, 2020, the Philadelphia 76ers announced that they had hired Rivers as their head coach. The 76ers won their first two games of the 2020–21 season, which earned Rivers his 945th career win, passing Hall of Famer Bill Fitch for 10th on the all-time coaching regular season wins list. The 76ers went on to secure the first seed in the Eastern Conference, and defeated the Washington Wizards in five games in the first round of the playoffs, but lost in the semifinals to the Atlanta Hawks in seven games. On May 14, 2023, the 76ers lost the conference semifinals series to the Celtics; two days later, Rivers was fired, ending his three-year tenure as head coach of the 76ers.

=== Milwaukee Bucks (2023–2026) ===
Beginning in December 2023, Rivers began serving as an informal consultant to Milwaukee Bucks first-year coach Adrian Griffin at the team's request. On January 26, 2024, after firing Griffin after 43 games, the Bucks announced that Rivers was hired as their head coach. Rivers' first game as the Bucks' head coach was a loss to the reigning champion Denver Nuggets on January 29, 2024.

On December 17, 2024, under the leadership of head coach Doc Rivers, the Milwaukee Bucks won the NBA Cup final against the Oklahoma City Thunder with a score of 97–81. This victory marked the Bucks as the second champions of this mid-season tournament, which was held in Las Vegas. Giannis Antetokounmpo delivered an impressive performance, recording a triple-double with 26 points, 19 rebounds, and 10 assists, earning him the title of Most Valuable Player for the event. Damian Lillard contributed significantly to the win with 23 points. The Bucks' triumph represented a turnaround in their season, as they had secured victories in 13 of their last 16 games during this period after a slow start.

On April 13, 2026, he resigned from his position as head coach. Myles Turner, center for the Bucks, stated on the Game Recognize Game podcast that under Doc Rivers there was a culture of disorganization. Players arrived late to practices, meetings, and even trips without facing punishment. Rivers was accused of failing to enforce discipline and allowing players to ignore schedules and commitments. The situation created a chaotic environment, with reports of low-intensity practices and internal conflict between the coach and the roster during the season.

== Broadcasting career ==
Following his retirement as a player, Rivers called games for the NBA on TNT before joining the Orlando Magic as head coach in 1999. With TNT Rivers was normally paired with Verne Lundquist and later with Kevin Harlan.

After being fired by the Orlando Magic in 2003, Rivers joined ESPN/ABC's NBA coverage, calling regular season games and the 2004 NBA Finals. Rivers worked on the top broadcast team with Brad Nessler on ESPN and Al Michaels on ABC. After the Finals, he left the broadcast booth to become the head coach of the Boston Celtics. In the summer of 2023, he was added to the lead broadcasting team for ESPN/ABC, joining Mike Breen and Doris Burke. During the semifinals of the 2023 NBA In-Season Tournament, Rivers worked with TNT commentators Kevin Harlan and Candace Parker during one game, as part of a collaboration between ESPN/ABC and TNT. In January 2024, Rivers left ESPN mid-season to become Milwaukee's head coach.

== NBA career statistics ==
Legend
GP	Games played	GS	Games started	MPG	Minutes per game
FG%	Field goal percentage	3P%	3-point field goal percentage	FT%	Free throw percentage
RPG	Rebounds per game	APG	Assists per game	SPG	Steals per game
BPG	Blocks per game	PPG	Points per game	**Bold**	Career high

=== Regular season ===
Year	Team	GP	GS	MPG	FG%	3P%	FT%	RPG	APG	SPG	BPG	PPG
1983–84	Atlanta	81	47	23.9	.462	.167	.785	2.7	3.9	1.6	.4	9.3
1984–85	Atlanta	69	58	30.8	**.476**	.417	.770	3.1	5.9	**2.4**	**.8**	14.1
1985–86	Atlanta	53	50	29.6	.474	.000	.608	3.1	8.4	2.3	.2	11.5
1986–87	Atlanta	**82**	**82**	31.6	.451	.190	.828	3.6	**10.0**	2.1	.4	12.8
1987–88	Atlanta	80	80	31.3	.453	.273	.758	**4.6**	9.3	1.8	.5	14.2
1988–89	Atlanta	76	76	32.4	.455	.347	**.861**	3.8	6.9	**2.4**	.5	13.6
1989–90	Atlanta	48	44	31.8	.454	.364	.812	4.2	5.5	**2.4**	.5	12.5
1990–91	Atlanta	79	79	**32.7**	.435	.336	.844	3.2	4.3	1.9	.6	**15.2**
1991–92	L.A. Clippers	59	25	28.1	.424	.283	.832	2.5	3.9	1.9	.3	10.9
1992–93	New York	77	45	24.5	.437	.317	.821	2.5	5.3	1.6	.1	7.8
1993–94	New York	19	19	26.3	.433	.365	.636	2.1	5.3	1.3	.3	7.5
1994–95	New York	3	0	15.7	.308	**.600**	.727	3.0	2.7	1.3	.0	6.3
1994–95	San Antonio	60	0	15.7	.360	.344	.732	1.7	2.6	1.0	.4	5.0
1995–96	San Antonio	78	0	15.8	.372	.343	.750	1.8	1.6	.9	.3	4.0
Career		864	605	27.3	.444	.328	.784	3.0	5.7	1.8	.4	10.9
All-Star		1	0	16.0	.500	—	.455	3.0	6.0	—	—	9.0

=== Playoffs ===
Year	Team	GP	GS	MPG	FG%	3P%	FT%	RPG	APG	SPG	BPG	PPG
1984	Atlanta	5	—	26.0	.500	.000	.878	2.0	3.2	**2.4**	**.8**	13.6
1986	Atlanta	9	9	29.1	.435	**.500**	.738	4.7	8.7	2.0	.0	12.7
1987	Atlanta	8	8	30.6	.383	—	.500	3.4	**11.3**	1.1	.4	7.8
1988	Atlanta	12	12	34.1	**.511**	.318	**.907**	**4.9**	9.6	2.1	.2	**15.7**
1989	Atlanta	5	5	**38.2**	.386	.316	.708	4.8	6.8	1.4	.4	13.4
1991	Atlanta	5	5	34.6	.469	.091	.895	4.0	3.0	1.0	.4	15.6
1992	L.A. Clippers	5	4	37.4	.446	**.500**	.815	3.8	4.2	1.2	.0	15.2
1993	New York	**15**	**15**	30.5	.453	.355	.767	2.6	5.7	1.9	.1	10.2
1995	San Antonio	**15**	0	21.2	.389	.370	.839	1.9	1.6	.9	.6	7.8
1996	San Antonio	2	0	10.0	.333	**.500**	—	.5	.0	.0	.0	1.5
Career		81	58	29.5	.446	.338	.767	3.3	5.9	1.5	.3	11.4

== Head coaching record ==
*	Record

Legend
Regular season	G	Games coached	W	Games won	L	Games lost	W–L %	Win–loss %
Playoffs	PG	Playoff games	PW	Playoff wins	PL	Playoff losses	PW–L %	Playoff win–loss %

Team	Year	G	W	L	W–L%	Finish	PG	PW	PL	PW–L%	Result
Orlando	1999–00	82	41	41	.500	4th in Atlantic	—	—	—	—	Missed playoffs
Orlando	2000–01	82	43	39	.524	4th in Atlantic	4	1	3	.250	Lost in first round
Orlando	2001–02	82	44	38	.537	3rd in Atlantic	4	1	3	.250	Lost in first round
Orlando	2002–03	82	42	40	.512	4th in Atlantic	7	3	4	.429	Lost in first round
Orlando	2003–04	11	1	10	.091	(fired)	—	—	—	—	—
Boston	2004–05	82	45	37	.549	1st in Atlantic	7	3	4	.429	Lost in first round
Boston	2005–06	82	33	49	.402	3rd in Atlantic	—	—	—	—	Missed playoffs
Boston	2006–07	82	24	58	.293	5th in Atlantic	—	—	—	—	Missed playoffs
Boston	2007–08	82	66	16	.805	1st in Atlantic	26*	16	10	.615	Won NBA championship
Boston	2008–09	82	62	20	.756	1st in Atlantic	14	7	7	.500	Lost in conference semifinals
Boston	2009–10	82	50	32	.610	1st in Atlantic	24	15	9	.625	Lost in NBA Finals
Boston	2010–11	82	56	26	.683	1st in Atlantic	9	5	4	.556	Lost in conference semifinals
Boston	2011–12	66	39	27	.591	1st in Atlantic	20	11	9	.550	Lost in conference finals
Boston	2012–13	81	41	40	.506	3rd in Atlantic	6	2	4	.333	Lost in first round
L.A. Clippers	2013–14	82	57	25	.695	1st in Pacific	13	6	7	.462	Lost in conference semifinals
L.A. Clippers	2014–15	82	56	26	.683	2nd in Pacific	14	7	7	.500	Lost in conference semifinals
L.A. Clippers	2015–16	82	53	29	.646	2nd in Pacific	6	2	4	.333	Lost in first round
L.A. Clippers	2016–17	82	51	31	.622	2nd in Pacific	7	3	4	.429	Lost in first round
L.A. Clippers	2017–18	82	42	40	.512	2nd in Pacific	—	—	—	—	Missed playoffs
L.A. Clippers	2018–19	82	48	34	.585	2nd in Pacific	6	2	4	.333	Lost in first round
L.A. Clippers	2019–20	72	49	23	.681	2nd in Pacific	13	7	6	.538	Lost in conference semifinals
Philadelphia	2020–21	72	49	23	.681	1st in Atlantic	12	7	5	.583	Lost in conference semifinals
Philadelphia	2021–22	82	51	31	.622	2nd in Atlantic	12	6	6	.500	Lost in conference semifinals
Philadelphia	2022–23	82	54	28	.659	2nd in Atlantic	11	7	4	.636	Lost in conference semifinals
Milwaukee	2023–24	36	17	19	.472	1st in Central	6	2	4	.333	Lost in first round
Milwaukee	2024–25	82	48	34	.585	3rd in Central	5	1	4	.200	Lost in first round
Milwaukee	2025–26	82	32	50	.390	3rd in Central	—	—	—	—	Missed playoffs
Career		2,060	1,194	866	.580		226	114	112	.504	

== Personal life ==
Rivers is the nephew of former NBA player Jim Brewer.

Rivers married wife Kristen in 1986, with whom he had four children, three sons and one daughter. Their oldest son, Jeremiah, played basketball at Georgetown University and Indiana University, and has played in the NBA D-League for the Maine Red Claws. His daughter Callie played volleyball for the University of Florida and is married to NBA player Seth Curry. Rivers's son Austin is an NBA player who last played for the Minnesota Timberwolves in 2023. His youngest son, Spencer, is a guard who played for Winter Park High School and for UC Irvine. Rivers and Kristen divorced in 2019.

Rivers became good friends with Major League Baseball (MLB) Hall of Fame pitcher John Smoltz of the Atlanta Braves during Rivers's tenure with the Atlanta Hawks. In 2009, Rivers was credited with helping lure Smoltz into signing with the Boston Red Sox while Rivers was the head coach of the Boston Celtics.

Rivers is featured in a Netflix documentary series, "The Playbook". In the first episode, Rivers details his experiences with family, the Celtics championship run and the Donald Sterling situation.

Rivers is a cousin of former NBA guard Byron Irvin and former MLB outfielder Ken Singleton.

Rivers has attention deficit hyperactivity disorder.

== See also ==
- List of National Basketball Association career steals leaders
- List of National Basketball Association players with most assists in a game
- List of National Basketball Association players with most steals in a game
