= New Mother =

1999 album

Studio album by Angels of Light
- Released: April 5, 1999
- Studio: Ethel Sound/Triclops (Atlanta, Georgia); King Mattress (Atlanta, Georgia); B.C. Studios (Brooklyn, New York); Spa Recording (New York City, New York)
- Genre: Neofolk; gothic country
- Length: 70:32
- Label: Young God
- Producer: Michael Gira

Angels of Light chronology
New Mother (1999)	How I Loved You (2001)

New Mother is the debut studio album by American folk music act Angels of Light. It was released on April 5, 1999 via frontman Michael Gira's own record label Young God Records, immediately after Michael Gira disbanded his previous band, Swans. The album features contributions from various musicians, including violinist Hahn Rowe, Rasputina band cellist Julia Kent, drummer Thor Harris, composer Joe McGinty and ex-Swans members Bill Rieflin, Phil Puleo and Bill Bronson.

The album contains versions of two songs that were performed live during Swans' final tour - "The Man With the Silver Tongue" and "Not Alone". The Michael Gira solo album Solo Recordings at Home contains an outtake from the recording session for this album, on the song "God's Servant", which was also released as a B-side to the accompanying single "Praise Your Name".

== Critical reception ==
Professional ratings
Review scores
Source	Rating
AllMusic	4/5 stars
Melody Maker	1.5/5 stars

Ned Raggett of AllMusic gave the album a positive review, stating: "No less than 19 musicians participated in the creation of New Mother, and the fact that Gira was able to synthesize their efforts and create such a powerful debut bodes well for his future efforts in this vein." He also wrote that the record "draws on a juxtaposition of lush '60s American and European pop orchestration." Jordan N. Mamone of CMJ also praised the album, writing: "While many of the Swans' attempts at levity sounded forced and gothic, the Angels of Light shine naturally, with poise and stunning clarity." He subsequently included the album in his "Top Ten Picks" list.

== Track listing ==
Side One
No.	Title	Length
1.	"Fragment"	0:31
2.	"Praise Your Name"	4:48
3.	"New Mother"	4:35
4.	"Angels of Light"	6:53
Total length:		16:47

Side Two
No.	Title	Length
5.	"Inner Female"	4:47
6.	"This Is Mine"	4:17
7.	"Shame"	4:10
8.	"Intermission"	1:14
9.	"The Man With the Silver Tongue"	4:13
Total length:		18:41

Side Three
No.	Title	Length
10.	"Real Person"	5:09
11.	"Forever Yours"	5:06
12.	"How We End"	2:35
13.	"The Garden Hides the Jewel"	5:21
Total length:		18:21

Side Four
No.	Title	Length
14.	"Not Alone"	4:33
15.	"Song for My Father"	3:41
16.	"His Entropic Highness"	5:33
17.	"Fear of Death"	2:56
Total length:		16:43 (70:32)

== Personnel ==
Angels of Light

- Michael Gira – vocals, composition, production, acoustic guitar, electric guitar

Additional musicians

- Bill Rieflin – piano, bass guitar, Farfisa organ, B3 organ, analog synthesizer, acoustic guitar, backing vocals
- Christoph Hahn – lap steel, classical and electric guitar, Casio organ, backing vocals
- Larry Mullins – vibraphone, timpani, tabla, percussion, backing vocals
- Thor Harris – hand drums, percussion, glockenspiel, backing vocals, water bowls
- Phil Puleo – percussion, melodica, organ, mouth harp
- Julia Kent – cello
- Bill Bronson – bass guitar
- Joe McGinty – upright piano
- Michele Amar – backing vocals
- Hahn Rowe – violin
- Birgit Staudt – accordion
- Thomas Dodd – Irish harp
- Martin Bisi – organ, backing vocals, engineering, mixing
- Chris Griffin – banjo, dobro, dulcimer, mandolin

Other personnel

- Hillary Johnson – assistant engineering, engineering
- Michael Moore – engineering

== Chart positions ==
Chart (1999)	Peak position
CMJ Radio 200	74
