= Austin Rivers =

American basketball player (born 1992)

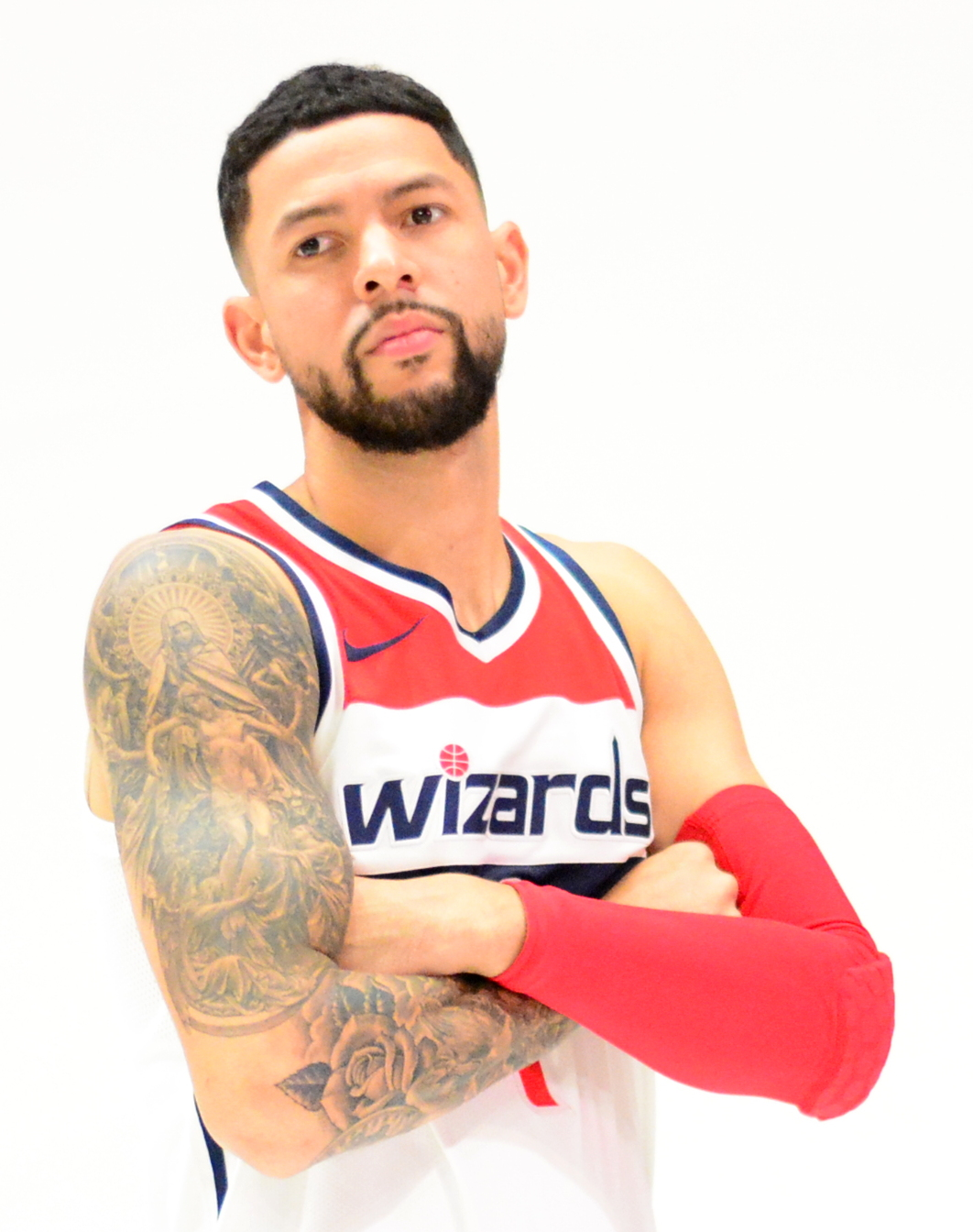
- Rivers with the Washington Wizards in 2018

Personal information
- Born: August 1, 1992 (age 34) Santa Monica, California, U.S.
- Listed height: 6 ft 4 in (1.93 m)
- Listed weight: 200 lb (91 kg)

Career information
- High school: Winter Park (Winter Park, Florida)
- College: Duke (2011–2012)
- NBA draft: 2012: 1st round, 10th overall pick
- Drafted by: New Orleans Hornets
- Playing career: 2012–2023
- Position: Shooting guard / point guard
- Number: 1, 8, 25

Career history
- 2012–2015: New Orleans Hornets / Pelicans
- 2015–2018: Los Angeles Clippers
- 2018: Washington Wizards
- 2018–2020: Houston Rockets
- 2020–2021: New York Knicks
- 2021–2022: Denver Nuggets
- 2022–2023: Minnesota Timberwolves

Career highlights
- Third-team All-American – NABC (2012); First-team All-ACC (2012); ACC Rookie of the Year (2012); ACC All-Freshman team (2012); National high school player of the year (2011); First-team Parade All-American (2011); Second-team Parade All-American (2010); McDonald's All-American (2011); Florida Mr. Basketball (2011)

Career NBA statistics
- Points: 5,996 (8.5 ppg)
- Rebounds: 1,442 (2.0 rpg)
- Assists: 1,513 (2.1 apg)
- Stats at NBA.com
- Stats at Basketball Reference
Medals
Men's basketball
Representing the United States
FIBA Americas U18 Championship
Gold medal – first place	2010 San Antonio	Team

Austin James Rivers (born August 1, 1992) is an American former professional basketball player who is currently a sports analyst for ESPN and NBC Sports. The son of basketball coach and former player Doc Rivers, he played for 11 seasons in the National Basketball Association (NBA). In the 2012 NBA draft, Rivers was selected with the 10th overall pick by the New Orleans Hornets (now Pelicans), playing three seasons there before being traded to the Los Angeles Clippers. After three years with the Clippers, he was traded to the Washington Wizards in June 2018. In December of the same year, he joined the Houston Rockets. He also played in the NBA for the New York Knicks, Denver Nuggets, and Minnesota Timberwolves.

Rivers led Winter Park High School to back-to-back Florida 6A state championships in 2010 and 2011. He also played in the 2011 Nike Hoop Summit for Team USA, and was a McDonald's All-American. He was one of the top rated high school basketball players in the class of 2011, being rated as high as No. 1 by Rivals.com. In October 2010, Rivers committed to Duke University.

On January 16, 2015, Rivers became the first player in NBA history to play for his father, coach Doc Rivers, then-head coach of the Clippers.

== High school career ==
In 2010, Rivers led Winter Park High School to the school's first state title in a 76–57 win against Dr. Phillips High School in the 6A state championship. Rivers scored 23 points in the game. In June 2010, Rivers was a part of the gold medal-winning team at the FIBA Americas U18 Championship where he set a Team USA record for an U18 event with 35 points against Canada. On August 5, 2010, Rivers was named to the fifth annual Boost Mobile Elite 24 game, where he was named co-MVP after he had 25 points, 4 rebounds and 4 assists.

On September 30, 2010, Rivers committed to Duke University. His commitment was widely covered by ESPN and various other sports networks given his status as the Class of 2011's top recruit. He officially signed with the program on November 16, 2010.

On March 5, 2011, Rivers led Winter Park to back to back Florida 6A state championships with a 52–44 victory over Dr. Phillips High School, in which he had 25 points, 11 rebounds and 4 steals. Rivers was named the 2011 Naismith Prep Player of the Year on March 10, 2011. He was also an All-American and All-State honoree, and played in the 2011 Nike Hoop Summit for Team USA.

College recruiting
Name	Hometown	School	Height	Weight	Commit date
Austin Rivers; SG	Winter Park, Florida	Winter Park High	6 ft 3 in (1.91 m)	175 lb (79 kg)	Sep 30, 2010
Austin Rivers; SG	Recruit ratings: Scout: Rivals: 247Sports: (98)				
Overall recruit ranking: Scout: 1 (SG); 3 (national); 2 (school) Rivals: 1 (SG); 1 (national) ESPN: 3 (national)
Note: In many cases, Scout, Rivals, 247Sports, On3, and ESPN may conflict in their listings of height and weight.; In these cases, the average was taken. ESPN grades are on a 100-point scale.; Sources: "2011 Duke Basketball Commitment List". Rivals. Archived from the original on February 28, 2017.; "2011 Duke College Basketball Team Recruiting Prospects". Scout. Archived from the original on February 28, 2017.; "Duke Blue Devils 2011 Player Commits". ESPN.; "Scout.com Team Recruiting Rankings". Scout.; "2011 Team Ranking". Rivals.

== College career ==
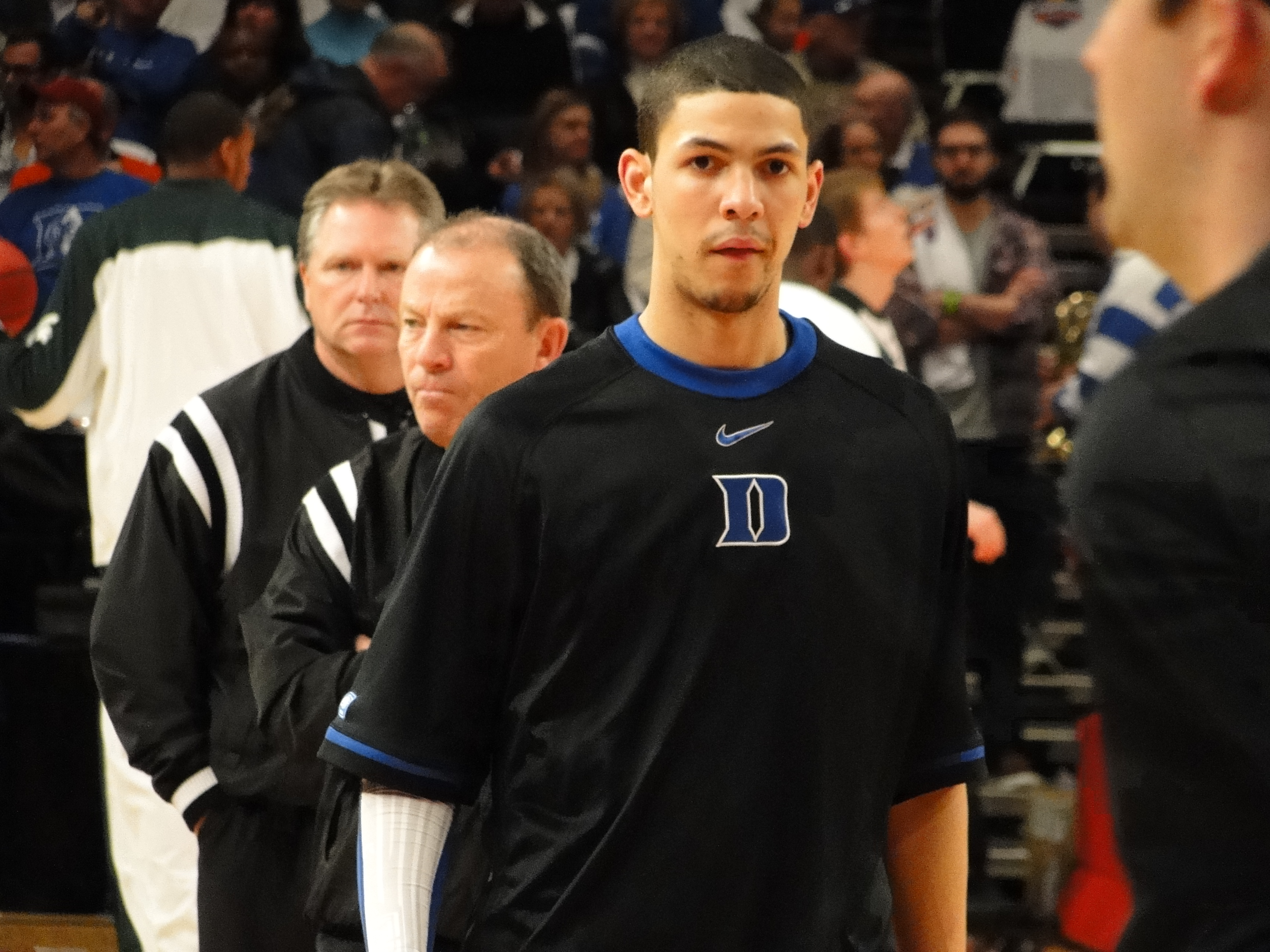
Rivers with the Blue Devils in 2011

As a freshman, Rivers played in Duke's exhibition games in China and Dubai during an international tour in August 2011. In the first game against the China men's national basketball team, Rivers scored 18 points on 8–19 shooting and led Duke to a 77–64 victory. In the second game (also against the Chinese national team), Rivers scored 12 points in a 78–66 victory, making several dunks during the first half. In the final game played in Beijing, Rivers chipped in 11 points as Duke topped the Chinese, 93–78. In his team's 86–66 victory over the Dubai national team, he scored 16 points, including 10 in the second quarter, on an array of impressive drives.

On February 8, 2012, his three-point basket as time expired allowed Duke to overcome an 82–72 deficit with two minutes to play in an 85–84 victory over the North Carolina. The victory ended North Carolina's 31-game winning streak at the Dean Smith Center.

On March 16, 2012, Rivers' college career ended in the "Round of 64" of the NCAA tournament, when Duke lost to Lehigh University. Rivers shot 5-of-14 from the field, while playing 34 minutes. Lehigh led for most of the game, earning their first NCAA Tournament victory.

On March 26, 2012, Rivers declared for the NBA draft, foregoing his final three years of college eligibility.

== Professional career ==
=== New Orleans Hornets / Pelicans (2012–2015) ===
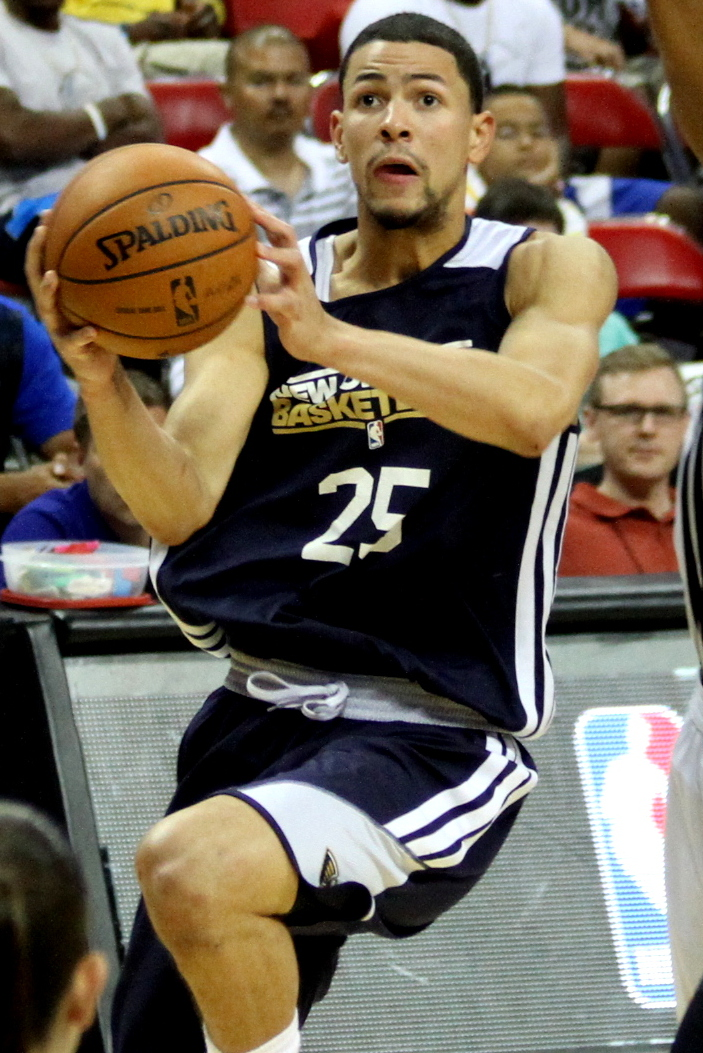
Rivers with the Pelicans during the NBA Summer League 2013

Rivers was selected by the New Orleans Hornets with the 10th overall pick the 2012 NBA draft. Rivers chose to wear the #25 jersey, the same number his father wore when he was in the NBA. The night before the draft, Rivers said, "I want to be like my dad, only better." Joining him as a rookie on the Hornets was Anthony Davis, the first overall pick of the draft. On July 24, 2012, Rivers signed his rookie scale contract with the Hornets. Three days later, Rivers underwent successful surgery to clean up bone spurs in his right ankle.

On October 31, 2012, Rivers made his NBA debut in the Hornets' season opener against the San Antonio Spurs. In 24 minutes as a starter, he scored 7 points on 1-of-9 shooting in a 99–95 loss. On December 14, he scored a then career-high 27 points in a 113–102 loss to the Minnesota Timberwolves. On March 6, 2013, he broke his hand and subsequently required surgery that forced him to miss the remainder of the season. For his rookie season, he averaged 6.2 points on 37% shooting from the field and 33% from three-point range. In April 2013, the Hornets changed their name to the Pelicans.

On October 16, 2013, the Pelicans exercised their third-year team option on Rivers' rookie scale contract, extending the contract through the 2014–15 season. On April 12, 2014, Rivers recorded season highs in points and rebounds with 20 and 10, respectively, in the Pelicans' 111–104 loss to the Houston Rockets.

On October 24, 2014, the Pelicans declined to exercise their fourth-year team option on Rivers' rookie scale contract, thereby not extending the contract through the 2015–16 season. On December 20, 2014, he scored a season-high 21 points in a 114–88 loss to the Portland Trail Blazers.

=== Los Angeles Clippers (2015–2018) ===
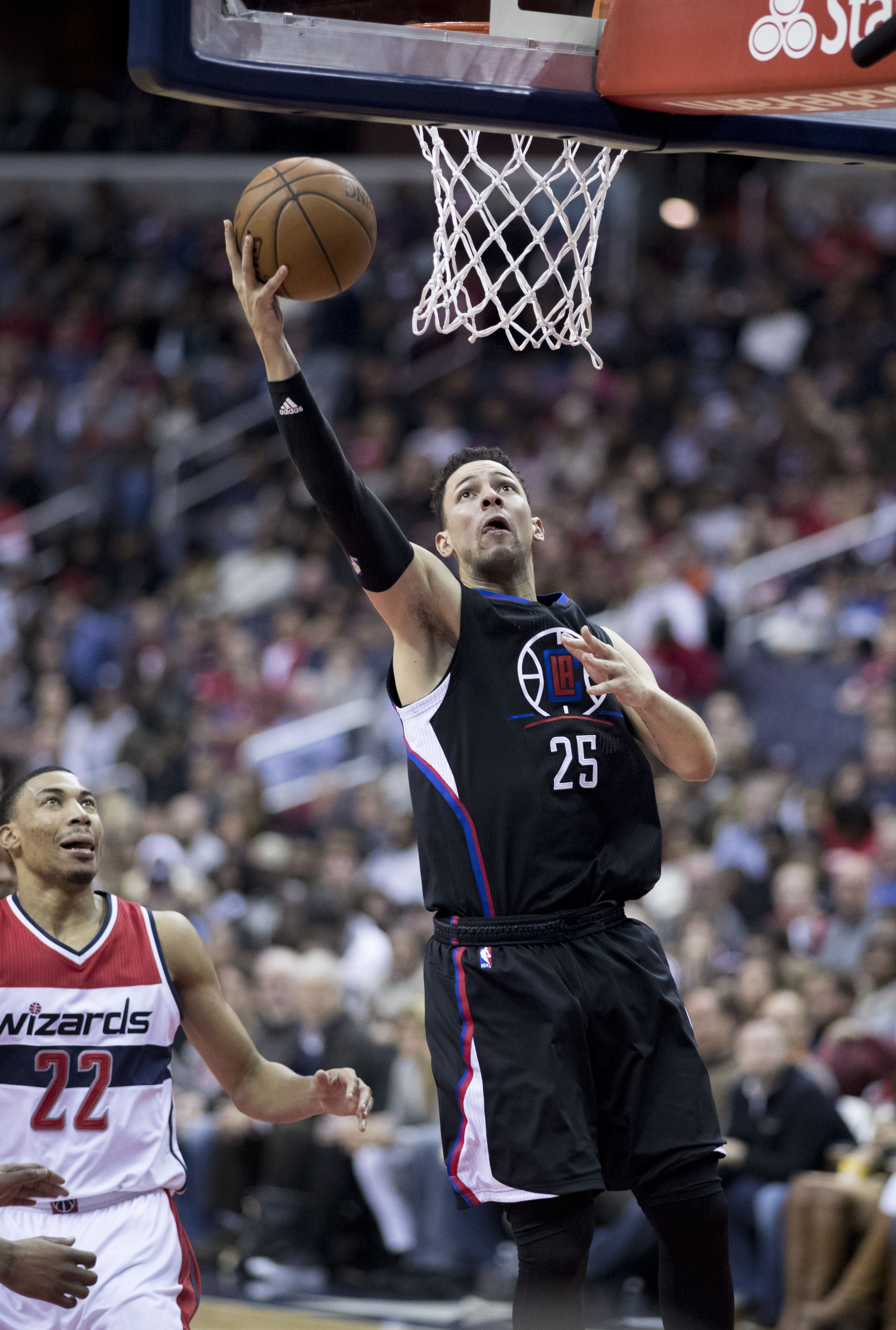
Rivers goes for a layup in 2016

On January 12, 2015, Rivers was traded to the Boston Celtics in a three-team trade involving the Pelicans and the Memphis Grizzlies. Three days later, he joined his father on the Los Angeles Clippers after he was traded in a three-team trade involving the Celtics and the Phoenix Suns. On January 16, Rivers made his debut for the Clippers and became the first son to play for his father in an NBA game. On February 21, Rivers scored a then-career-high 28 points in a 129–98 win over the Sacramento Kings. On May 8, he scored a playoff career-high 25 points in the Clippers' 124–99 victory that gave them a 2–1 lead in the Western Conference semi-finals against the Houston Rockets.

On July 13, 2015, Rivers re-signed with the Clippers. On February 6, 2016, he was ruled out for four to six weeks with a broken left hand. On March 31, he scored a career-high 32 points in a 119–117 loss to the Oklahoma City Thunder. On April 29, Rivers recorded 21 points and eight assists against the Portland Trail Blazers in game 6 of their first-round playoff series. However, with a 106–103 loss, the Clippers were eliminated from the playoffs. In the game, Rivers required 11 stitches above his left eye from a collision in the first quarter.

On July 8, 2016, Rivers again re-signed with the Clippers. On December 14, 2016, he scored a season-high 25 points on 7-of-10 from three-point range and 9-of-12 from the field in a 113–108 win over the Orlando Magic. On January 4, 2017, he set a new season high with 28 points in a 115–106 win over the Memphis Grizzlies. He averaged career highs of 12.0 points, 2.2 rebounds and 2.8 assists during the 2016–17 regular season, but due to a strained left hamstring, Rivers missed the last six games of the regular season and the first four games of the playoffs before returning in game 5 of the Clippers' first-round playoff series against the Utah Jazz.

On December 3, 2017, Rivers scored a season-high 30 points in a 112–106 loss to the Minnesota Timberwolves. On December 22, 2017, he scored 30 of his career-high 36 points in the second half of the Clippers' 128–118 win over the Houston Rockets. The following night, he set a new career high with 38 points in a 115–112 loss to the Memphis Grizzlies. Rivers missed 18 games between late December and early February with a heel bruise.

=== Washington Wizards (2018) ===
On June 26, 2018, Rivers was traded to the Washington Wizards in exchange for Marcin Gortat. On December 17, 2018, Rivers was traded with Kelly Oubre Jr. to the Phoenix Suns for Trevor Ariza. Rivers was waived by the Suns the following day.

=== Houston Rockets (2018–2020) ===
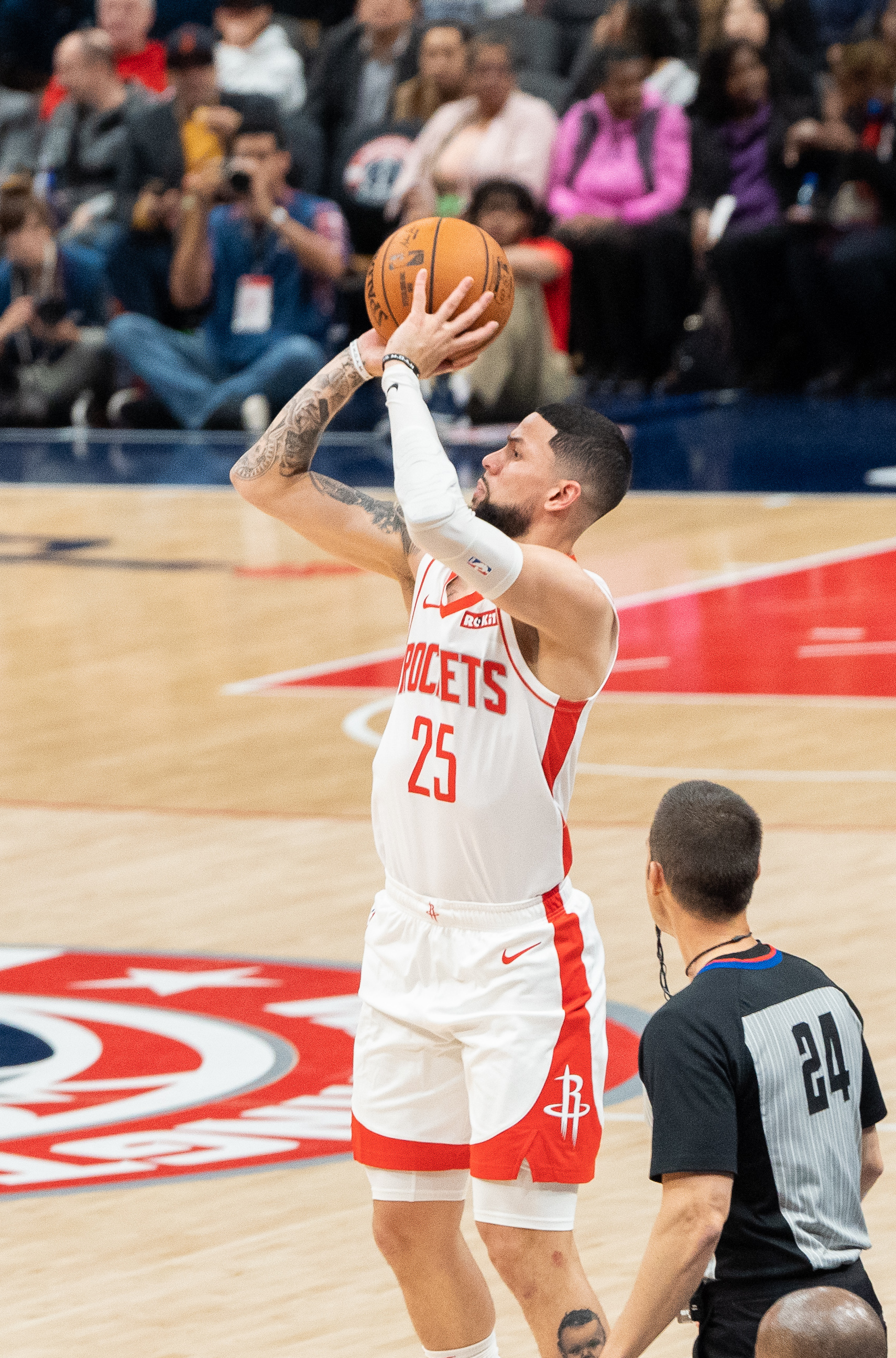
Austin Rivers shooting

On December 24, 2018, Rivers signed with the Houston Rockets. On January 5, 2019, he scored a season-high 21 points in a 110–101 loss to the Portland Trail Blazers. On April 7, in a 149–113 blowout win against the Phoenix Suns, Rivers made the 27th three-pointer of the game with 1:09 left on the clock in the fourth quarter, beating the Rockets' own previous record of most made threes by one team in a game (26). He appeared in 47 games while averaging 8.7 points, 2.3 assists and 1.9 rebounds in 28.6 minutes per game. The Rockets won 72% of their games after signing Rivers. He started 13 straight games as a Rocket from December 31 through January 25, averaging 11.6 points, 3.8 assists and 2.7 rebounds in 38.1 minutes per game. Houston was 15–5 when Rivers scored in double figures and 9–1 when he recorded at least four assists. He also had nearly as many steals (29) as turnovers (32) with the Rockets. On August 9, 2020, Rivers scored a career-high 41 points off the bench and the Rockets used a big third quarter to pull away and cruise to a 129–112 victory over the Sacramento Kings in the Orlando bubble. Rivers made six 3-pointers as Houston improved to 4–1 at Disney on a night the Rockets played a second straight game without Russell Westbrook, who had a bruised right quadriceps.

=== New York Knicks (2020–2021) ===
On November 27, 2020, Rivers was acquired by the New York Knicks via a sign-and-trade deal that sent the draft rights of Issuf Sanon to Houston. On March 25, 2021, Rivers was traded to the Oklahoma City Thunder in a three team trade that sent Terrance Ferguson, Vincent Poirier, the drafts rights of Emir Preldžić, and two future second-round picks to New York. Rivers was waived by the Thunder three days later.

=== Denver Nuggets (2021–2022) ===
On April 20, 2021, the Denver Nuggets signed Rivers to a 10-day contract following a season ending injury sustained by Jamal Murray. Ten days later, he was signed for the rest of the season.

On September 1, 2021, Rivers re-signed with the Nuggets.

=== Minnesota Timberwolves (2022–2023) ===
On July 14, 2022, Rivers signed a one-year contract with the Minnesota Timberwolves. On February 4, 2023, Rivers was suspended by the NBA for three games without pay due to his role in an altercation during a game against the Orlando Magic the day before. During the altercation, Rivers threw punches at Magic center Mo Bamba.

== Broadcasting career ==
On October 23, 2023, it was announced that Rivers was hired by ESPN as an NBA analyst.

Rivers joined NBC Sports for its college basketball and NBA coverage in 2025.

== Career statistics ==
Legend
GP	Games played	GS	Games started	MPG	Minutes per game
FG%	Field goal percentage	3P%	3-point field goal percentage	FT%	Free throw percentage
RPG	Rebounds per game	APG	Assists per game	SPG	Steals per game
BPG	Blocks per game	PPG	Points per game	**Bold**	Career high

=== NBA ===
==== Regular season ====
Year	Team	GP	GS	MPG	FG%	3P%	FT%	RPG	APG	SPG	BPG	PPG
2012–13	New Orleans	61	26	23.2	.372	.326	.546	1.8	2.1	.4	.1	6.2
2013–14	New Orleans	69	4	19.4	.405	.364	.636	1.9	2.3	.7	.1	7.7
2014–15	New Orleans	35	3	22.1	.387	.280	.746	1.9	2.5	.5	.2	6.8
2014–15	L.A. Clippers	41	2	19.3	.427	.309	.582	2.0	1.7	.7	.2	7.1
2015–16	L.A. Clippers	67	7	21.9	.438	.335	.681	1.9	1.5	.7	.1	8.9
2016–17	L.A. Clippers	**74**	29	27.8	**.442**	.371	.691	2.2	2.8	.7	.1	12.0
2017–18	L.A. Clippers	61	**59**	**33.7**	.424	**.378**	.642	2.4	**4.0**	**1.2**	**.3**	**15.1**
2018–19	Washington	29	2	23.6	.392	.311	.543	2.4	2.0	.6	**.3**	7.2
2018–19	Houston	47	13	28.6	.413	.321	.510	1.9	2.3	.6	**.3**	8.7
2019–20	Houston	68	4	23.4	.421	.356	.703	**2.6**	1.7	.7	.1	8.8
2020–21	New York	21	2	21.0	.430	.364	.714	2.2	2.0	.6	.0	7.3
2020–21	Denver	15	5	26.9	.418	.375	.706	2.3	2.6	**1.2**	.1	8.7
2021–22	Denver	67	18	22.1	.417	.342	.727	1.7	1.3	.8	.1	6.0
2022–23	Minnesota	52	10	19.5	.435	.350	**.769**	1.6	1.4	.5	.1	4.9
Career		707	184	23.8	.419	.349	.653	2.0	2.1	.7	.2	8.5

==== Playoffs ====
Year	Team	GP	GS	MPG	FG%	3P%	FT%	RPG	APG	SPG	BPG	PPG
2015	L.A. Clippers	**14**	2	17.9	.438	.371	.632	1.7	1.1	.7	**.3**	8.4
2016	L.A. Clippers	6	2	24.0	.426	.235	.667	**2.7**	**2.7**	.5	.0	**10.3**
2017	L.A. Clippers	3	2	30.1	.346	.308	**1.000**	**2.7**	.7	.3	**.3**	8.0
2019	Houston	10	0	21.5	.435	**.457**	.667	2.1	1.0	.5	.1	7.4
2020	Houston	12	0	17.6	.311	.257	.769	2.5	1.3	.6	.1	4.8
2021	Denver	10	**9**	**30.5**	.435	.413	.813	1.7	2.1	.2	**.3**	9.2
2022	Denver	5	0	21.6	.444	.333	**1.000**	.6	1.2	**1.4**	.2	4.2
2023	Minnesota	4	0	11.6	**.500**	.333	–	1.3	.3	.3	.0	2.5
Career		64	15	21.4	.412	.357	.727	1.9	1.4	.6	.2	7.1

=== College ===
Year	Team	GP	GS	MPG	FG%	3P%	FT%	RPG	APG	SPG	BPG	PPG
2011–12	Duke	34	33	33.2	.433	.365	.658	3.4	2.1	1.0	.0	15.5

== Personal life ==
Rivers was born in Santa Monica, California, the son of former NBA head coach and former player Doc Rivers and Kristen Rivers (née Campion). Doc Rivers was a former player who had joined the Los Angeles Clippers the summer of his son's birth. His older brother, Jeremiah, played basketball for Georgetown and Indiana and later joined the Maine Red Claws, while his older sister Callie played volleyball for the University of Florida and is married to his former Duke teammate and current Golden State Warriors player Seth Curry. His younger brother, Spencer, was a guard who played for UC Irvine from 2014 to 2019.

He was named Austin after former Cleveland Cavaliers guard Austin Carr, while his middle name, James, is in honor of his great-uncle Jim Brewer.

His first child, a son with Brittany Hotard, was born in 2018. Rivers' two children with Audreyana Michelle, a son and a daughter, were born in March 2021 and June 2024.
