= What We Did =

Studio album by M. Gira and D. Matz
- Released: November 13, 2001
- Length: 48:19
- Label: Young God
- Producer: Michael Gira; Dan Matz

Michael Gira chronology
Somniloquist (2000)	What We Did (2001)	Solo Recordings at Home (2001)

Dan Matz chronology
What We Did (2001)	Blank Ages (2011)

What We Did is a collaborative studio album by Swans frontman Michael Gira and Windsor for the Derby member Dan Matz. It was released on November 13, 2001, through Gira's Young God Records label.

== Musical style ==
What We Did has a considerably more pop-oriented and accessible sound, compared to Gira's other solo works. The majority of the lyrics on the album were written by Matz.

== Critical reception ==
Professional ratings
Review scores
Source	Rating
Allmusic	4/5 stars
Pitchfork	8.4/10

Allmusic critic Thom Jurek described the album as "a finely wrought album of relayed styles and layered textures enfolding one another into a music that could have only been made by these two men, with a small host of guests who appear intermittently," and further stated: "The songs here are all questions that are more pronounced after their seeming narratives have entered back into the silence from whence they came." Daphne Carr of Pitchfork wrote: "The rewards of this record aren't reaped through immediate digestibility, but through repeated suggestion. Still, this is by far the most palatable of Gira's growing mass of output and an indication of continued innovation in collaborating with those whose moods, ideas, and melodies augment his own dark brilliance." Philip Sherburne of Wondering Sound described it as "one of the quietest albums in Michael Gira’s catalog."

== Track listing ==
All tracks are written by Michael Gira and Dan Matz except where noted.

No.	Title	Writer(s)	Length
1.	"Pacing the Locks"		4:41
2.	"Is/Was"		7:19
3.	"Cold Creeping"		3:55
4.	"Lines"		3:47
5.	"Brown Eyes"		2:01
6.	"17 Hours"	Tamer Eid; Gira; Matz; Luke Michel; Todd Watts; Erik Wenberg	6:19
7.	"Stitches"		5:16
8.	"Waiting Beside Viragio"		2:16
9.	"Forcing Mary"		3:06
10.	"Quiet One"		3:25
11.	"Sunflower"	Matz; Mack David; Gira; Neil Diamond	3:20
12.	"The Brightest Star"		3:37
Total length:			48:19

== Personnel ==
- Michael Gira – vocals, performance, production
- Dan Matz – vocals, performance, production
- Anna Neighbor – backing vocals (4, 5, 12)
- James Plotkin – guitar, vocals (1, 2)
