= Thomas Dodd (artist) =

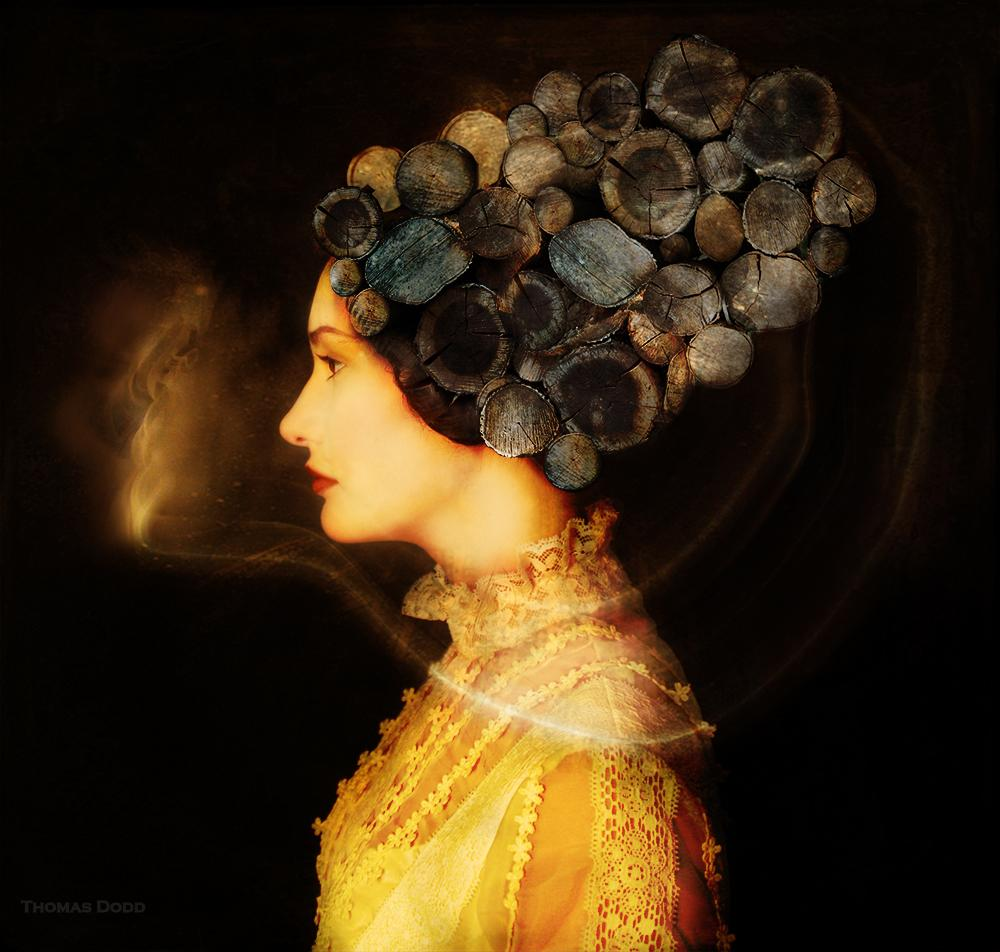
Brainstorm by Thomas Dodd

Thomas Dodd (born in Perth Amboy, New Jersey 1961) is a digital artist and photographer based in Atlanta, Georgia. His art images result from digitally transforming his photographs to make them look painterly, subtly blurring the lines between photography and classical art. He often creates moving surreal images inspired by religious and mythological themes, using styles comparable to those of renowned modern painters like Gustav Klimt, John William Waterhouse and René Magritte. Dodd's art-work has been frequently cited and revised by many of his peers and specialized art websites. His work has been exhibited in many cities in the US and around the world, and made its way to inhabit important permanent public collections

== Career ==
Thomas Dodd's father was an advanced amateur photographer of Irish ancestry, who taught his son the essentials of photography: composition, depth, lighting, and how to make quality portraits. Dodd in turn, learnt the basic techniques of a dark-room laboratory (such as negative development, enlarging, printing etc.) as part of his extra-curricular activity while attending Winter Park High School in Orange County, Florida. Dodd became interested in artistic photography through admiring Ansel Adam´s prints at a gallery in Florida. Inspired by punk rock groups like the Sex Pistols and Ramones, Dodd learnt to play the guitar and spent the 1980s playing in punk rock bands in Florida and Atlanta. Soon after, Dodd became interested in Irish music and learnt to play the Celtic harp. In 1992 Dodd founded an ambient Celtic ensemble called Trio Nocturna, which had several sponsored appearances in New Orleans, Chicago and Atlanta. Trio Nocturna gained attention in the Gothic scene, recording three commercial albums named Morphia, Tears of Light and Songs of the Celtic Night. After Trio Nocturna disbanded in 1997, Dodd did session work as a harpist, most notably with Swans frontman Michael Gira on two albums: The Angels of Light's New Mother (1999) and The Body Lovers (2005).

After a 25-year career as a professional musician, Dodd reemerged as a photographer in 2006, captivated by the popularization of Digital photography and image-processing software, on which he taught himself through online tutorials and books. Digital editing programs and the virtually limitless possibilities of photo-manipulation led Dodd back into photography as a vehicle of creative expression. Dodd's artistic photography has been praised by artist Richard T. Scott (video Artist Spotlight, min 24:00), and also has been the subject of several interviews and articles. Some of them have particularly focused on Dodd's inquiries in the treatment of light. Apart from his mainstream motifs, Dodd has been developing a novel aesthetic line in his series of nudist pictures All Bodies Are Beautiful. He is also developing a series of pieces depicting African American people. Dodd teaches his art through seminars, workshops and individual coaching. His work has had an acknowledged influence on Steampunk Neo-Victorian Fashion

In 2018, Dodd started teaching and presenting seminars for PPA (Professional Photographers of America, and presentations at their annual Imaging USA conferences, while continuing his art career with gallery shows and exhibitions in various parts of the US and Europe. Dodd began playing the Celtic harp again in 2020, livestreaming his performances on social networks during the Covid-19 lockdowns and restrictions.

== Exhibits and collections ==
Thomas Dodd has exhibited his visual art worldwide, including Germany, Romania, Argentina, New York City, México City, Orlando, Miami, San Antonio, Seattle, París and Atlanta. Some recent solo and group exhibitions of Dodd's work include:

- 2013, Anarte Gallery, San Antonio (TX)
- 2014, Gallery One, Nashville (TN)
- 2014, Brukenthal Museum (Rumania), Exhibition: Darkness of Mexico
- 2015, Washington (DC), Gallery NK
- 2015, Customs House Museum – Tennessee,
- 2015, Frankfurt (Germany), The Dream Factory
- 2015, solo show at Corvidae Gallery in Nashville Tennessee
- 2017, solo show at Satellite Gallery, Asheville North Carolina
- 2017, solo show at Josette’s Gallery, Valdosta, Georgia
- 2017 and 2018, group shows at Haven Gallery, New York
- 2018, solo show at ArtworksTrenton, Trenton, New Jersey
- 2018, group show at Museum of Silo Villacañas (Toledo, Spain)
- 2018, solo show at Creasons Fine Art Gallery, New Orleans Louisiana

Some of Dodd's works earned distinctions at recent exhibitions in New York City and New Orleans, where his work Ascension of the Magdalene is on permanent display at the International House Hotel. Dodd's work is also present in permanent collections at the Galerie L’Oeil du Prince in Paris, in the US at the New Britain Museum of American Art and at the Museo Arte Contemporaneo in Catania, Sicily.

== Technique ==
Dodd has developed a unique technique that he calls painterly photo montage, where he employs software to blend and layer multiple photos together to create a final painterly image. The print resulting from this technique is often processed further with non-digital resources. Finished images are mounted on wood panels and then painted over with finishing gel or beeswax, a method called photo encaustic painting. When the image is printed again, it comes out bearing a seemingly tangible texture on top of the photographic composition. Dodd's work is said to be an organic composite of elements that always strive for the end result to be both beautiful and thought-provoking.
