= Solo Recordings at Home =

Studio album by Michael Gira
- Released: 2001
- Genre: Singer-Songwriter
- Length: 61:16
- Label: Young God
- Producer: Michael Gira

Michael Gira chronology
What We Did (2001)	Solo Recordings at Home (2001)	Living '02 (2002)

Solo Recordings at Home is an album by American singer-songwriter and musician Michael Gira. It was released in 2001 through Gira's own record label, Young God Records. The album features Gira's home recordings.

The unreleased track from the home recording sessions were included in the album The Milk of M. Gira: Selected Solo Home Recordings 2001-2010, released in 2011.

== Background and music ==
Solo Recordings at Home is primarily an acoustic album, "placing the emphasis on Gira's voice and guitar only, captured at home via one microphone." Nevertheless, the track "Irish Queen" was roughly recorded during a concert and the fully orchestrated track "God's Servant" was taken directly from the Angels of Light's New Mother (1999). The album also features reworkings of two Swans tracks, "I Remember Who You Are" and "Love Will Save You," from The Burning World (1989) and White Light From the Mouth of Infinity (1991), respectively.

The songs on the album feature lyrics on various topics. The track "Kosinsky" was described as "a fascinating contrast to the lyrical meditation on voyeurism" while the tracks "Surrogate" and "On the Mountain" were described to be "among his bluntest ever."

== Critical reception ==
Professional ratings
Review scores
Source	Rating
Allmusic	4/5 stars

Allmusic critic Ned Raggett wrote: "In keeping with his post-Swans work, though, Gira's singing balances command with empathy, cracked and tender at once; anyone not taken with his late-'90s singing won't be convinced here, though fans will find it addictive." Raggett further wrote: "His guitar playing similarly can shift on a dime from sudden, brusque runs to gentler, steady fingerpicking, evoking everything from strung out rural blues to Nick Drake's hushed emptiness while still sounding uniquely in his own style."

== Track listing ==
All songs written by Michael Gira.

1. "What You Were" – 5:36
2. "All Souls' Rising" – 5:55
3. "Love Will Save You" – 4:46
4. "Surrogate" – 5:45
5. "Kosinsky" – 4:47
6. "On The Mountain" – 6:31
7. "Waiting Beside Viragio" – 2:19
8. "Someone Like Me" – 4:47
9. "I Remember Who You Are" – 4:57
10. "Mosquito Coast" – 5:11
11. "Irish Queen" – 4:41
12. "God's Servant" – 4:48
13. "Mary Found John" – 1:13

== Personnel ==
- Michael Gira – vocals, guitar, recording, artwork
