= 2011 Maui Invitational =

Early-season college basketball tournament

- Season: 2011–12
- Teams: 8
- Finals site: Lahaina Civic Center, Maui, Hawaii
- Champions: Duke (5th title)
- Runner-up: Kansas (2nd title game)
- Semifinalists: Michigan (5th semifinal); UCLA (3rd semifinal)
- Winning coach: Mike Krzyzewski (5th title)
- MVP: Ryan Kelly (Duke)

The 2011 Maui Invitational Tournament was an early-season college basketball tournament played from November 11 to November 23, 2011. It was the 28th annual holding of the Maui Invitational Tournament, which began in 1984, and was part of the 2011–12 NCAA Division I men's basketball season. The Championship Round was played at the Lahaina Civic Center in Maui, Hawaii from November 21 to 23. The Duke Blue Devils won the tournament title, defeating the Kansas Jayhawks in the championship game on November 23 by a score of 68–61. Duke's Ryan Kelly was named the MVP of the tournament. With the victory, Duke won the Maui Invitational Tournament for the fifth time in five appearances, improving the program's overall record at the Maui competition to 15–0.

== Brackets ==
* – Denotes overtime period

=== Opening Round ===
The Opening Round was played on November 11, 14 and 15 at various sites around the country.

==== November 11 ====
- Kansas 100, Towson 54 in Lawrence, KS
- Tennessee 92, UNC Greensboro 63 in Knoxville, TN
- Duke 77, Belmont 76 in Durham, NC

==== November 14 ====
- Michigan 64, Towson 47 in Ann Arbor, MI
- Georgetown 86, UNC Greensboro 45 in Washington, DC

==== November 15 ====
- UCLA 66, Middle Tennessee 86 in Los Angeles, CA
- Memphis 97, Belmont 81 in Memphis, TN

=== Regional Round ===
Semifinals; November 19
UNC Greensboro	60
Middle Tennessee	82
Towson	41
Belmont	87

Final; November 20
Middle Tennessee	84
Belmont	87*
3rd-place game
UNC Greensboro	72
Towson	60

*Games played at Murphy Center in Murfreesboro, Tennessee

== Championship Round ==
The Championship Round occurred from November 21–23 at Lahaina Civic Center in Maui, Hawaii.

Fifth Place Game; November 23
8	Memphis	88
Georgetown	91*
Seventh Place Game
Tennessee	86
Chaminade	60

Consolation 2nd Round; November 22
8	Memphis	99**
Tennessee	97
Chaminade	61
Georgetown	88

Quarterfinals; November 21
15	Michigan	73
8	Memphis	61
Tennessee	67
6	Duke	77
UCLA	92
Chaminade	60
Georgetown	63
14	Kansas	67

Semifinals; November 22
15	Michigan	75
6	Duke	82
UCLA	56
14	Kansas	72

Championship; November 23
6	Duke	68
14	Kansas	61
Third-place game
15	Michigan	79
UCLA	63
