= Tyler Thornton =

American basketball player and coach (born 1992)

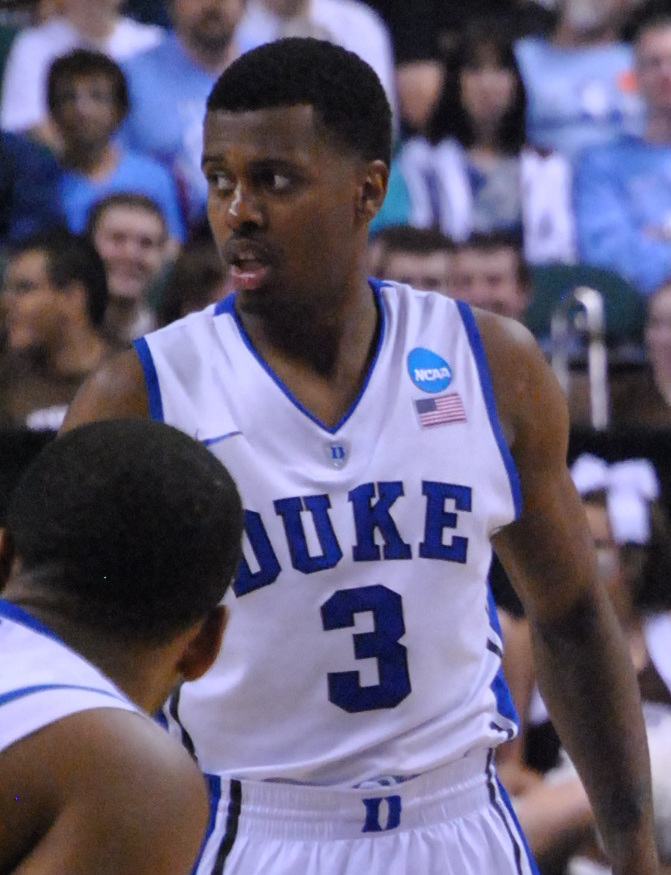
- Thornton with Duke in 2012

Duke Blue Devils
- Title: Assistant coach
- League: Atlantic Coast Conference

Personal information
- Born: April 5, 1992 (age 34) Silver Spring, Maryland, U.S.
- Listed height: 6 ft 1 in (1.85 m)
- Listed weight: 195 lb (88 kg)

Career information
- High school: Gonzaga (Washington, D.C.)
- College: Duke (2010–2014)
- NBA draft: 2014: undrafted
- Playing career: 2017–2019
- Position: Point guard
- Coaching career: 2019–present

Career history

Playing
- 2017–2018: Yakima SunKings
- 2018–2019: Helsinki Seagulls
- 2019: Halifax Hurricanes

Coaching
- 2019–2025: Howard (assistant)
- 2025–present: Duke (assistant)

Tyler Damascus Thornton (born April 5, 1992) is an American basketball coach and former professional player who is an assistant coach for the Duke Blue Devils men's basketball team. He was one of the top-rated high school point guards in the class of 2010. Thornton played college basketball for the Duke Blue Devils.

== High school ==
Thornton attended Gonzaga College High School in Washington, D.C., where he averaged 14.7 points, 3.4 rebounds, 4.0 assists and 2.1 steals per game as a senior while maintaining a GPA over 3.3. He also lettered four times, twice named team MVP. He holds the school record for career wins. Thornton was named MVP of the Gonzaga D.C. Classic and the Hoopball Classic. Thornton made the all-tournament teams at the Iolani Classic and Alhambra Invitational. In his senior year he was named to two all-conference teams and the Gonzaga Coaches award in 2008. Named D.C. Sports Fan Freshman of the Year and Gonzaga Mr. Assist award in his first season on varsity. He also played AAU basketball on the D.C. Assault with his Duke Blue Devil teammate Josh Hairston.

College recruiting
Name	Hometown	School	Height	Weight	Commit date
Tyler Thornton; PG	Washington, D.C.	Gonzaga College High School	6 ft 1 in (1.85 m)	195 lb (88 kg)	Sep 13, 2008
Tyler Thornton; PG	Recruit ratings: Scout: Rivals: (92)				

== College career ==
Thornton committed to Duke University on September 13, 2008, over Georgetown, North Carolina State, Texas and Virginia.

== Coaching career ==
Thornton joined the Howard Bison men's basketball team as an assistant coach in 2019.

On May 30, 2025, it was announced that Thornton would join the coaching staff at Duke.
