= Donald C. Griffin =

American physicist (1942–2025)

- Born: Donald Christian Griffin; April 27, 1942; Pittsburgh, Pennsylvania, U.S.
- Died: October 17, 2025 (aged 83)
- Education: Rollins College; Purdue University
- Occupation: Physicist
- Spouse: Heather Marwick (m. 1963)
- Children: 2

Donald Christian Griffin (April 27, 1942 – October 17, 2025) was an American physicist on the faculty of Rollins College. He also served in administrated positions as interim dean of faculty, vice provost, and acting provost at Rollins.

== Early life and education ==
Griffin was born in Pittsburgh, Pennsylvania, the son of Morgan and Marjorie Griffin. He attended Winter Park High School, graduating in 1960. After graduating, he attended Rollins College, where he participated in a summer 1963 National Science Foundation program, "designed to bring able undergraduates into direct contact with research experiences and research scientists".

Griffin married Heather Marwick in 1963, and they reared two children, son Morgan and daughter Kate.

Griffins earned his B.S. degree in 1964, and continued his studies at Purdue University, earning his M.S. degree in 1966 and his Ph.D. degree in atomic physics in 1970. His dissertation, Self-Consistent Field Calculations of Excited Electronic Configurations, was advised by Kenneth L. Andrew.

== Career ==
In summer of 1966 Griffi was an associate engineer for Martin Marietta Company, and then worked as research assistant and at Los Alamos National Laboratory.

Griffin served on the faculty at Rollins College in the Department of Physics from 1970 to 2009. In 1974, he became the manager of the college computer system, a commercial timesharing network representing "a significant increase in computer access and storage" at the college. He was promoted to the rank of professor in 1983. The Orlando Sentinel reported, "Professor Donald C. Griffin of the physics department has received a grant from Oak Ridge National Laboratory in Tennessee, for the third consecutive year. Griffin's $30,000 grant will have him working in conjunction with atomic physicists on the electron-ion scattering theory." In 1986–87, he had a fellowship at the Institute of Astrophysics in Boulder, Colorado.

In addition to teaching physics courses, Griffin conducted research at Los Alamos, Livermore, and Oak Ridge, as well as Auburn University, Harvard University, and the Joint Institute for Laboratory Astrophysics at the University of Colorado. He also as served at various times as Physics Department chair, Rollins College vice provost, acting provost, and interim dean of faculty.

== Awards ==
In 1995, Griffin was named a fellow of the American Physical Society, cited for theoretical developments in the fields of relativistic atomic structure and electron collisions with atomic ions, as well as contributions to undergraduate science education.

In 2001 Griffin became the Archibald Granville Bush Professor of Science, and also earned the Rollins Decoration of Honor.

In 2004, Griffin was named the winner of the Bornstein Award for Faculty Scholarship.
