= Winter Park High School =

Public high school in Winter Park, Florida, United States

Location
- 2100 Summerfield Road; Winter Park, Florida 32792; United States; 28.5851°N 81.32293°W

Information
- Type: Public
- Established: 1927
- School district: Orange County Public Schools
- Superintendent: Barbara Jenkins
- Principal: Michael Meechin
- Faculty: 154.00 (FTE)
- Grades: 9-12
- Enrollment: 3,369 (2022–23)
- Student to teacher ratio: 21.88
- Colors: Orange and Black
- Mascot: Willie the Wildcat
- Nickname: Wildcats
- Website: winterparkhs.ocps.net

Winter Park High School (often abbreviated as WPHS)––located in Winter Park, Florida, United States––is one of nineteen public high schools in Orange County. Winter Park High School is an International Baccalaureate school and delivers Advanced Placement courses.

== History ==
Winter Park High School was constructed at 528 Huntington Avenue in 1923 and was one of the first high schools in Orange County. The school remained in this location until construction began in 1969 at the present location (2100 Summerfield Road). The original campus remains in use to this day as the Winter Park High School Ninth Grade Center, a campus exclusively used by ninth-grade students.

== Athletics ==
The following sports are offered at Winter Park:

- Athletic Training
- Baseball
- Basketball
- Bowling
- Cheerleading
- Crew
- Cross country running
- Flag football
- Football
- Golf
- Lacrosse
- Quiz Bowl
- Soccer
- Softball
- Special Olympics
- Swimming
- Tennis
- Track and field
- Volleyball
- Water polo
- Weightlifting
- Wrestling

== Notable alumni ==
- Rafael Araujo-Lopes (2014), American football player
- Amanda Bearse (1976), actress
- Jack Billingham (1961), baseball player (MLB)
- Torrey DeVitto, actress
- Thomas Dodd, Digital artist and photographer
- George Eddy, American-French basketball commentator and professional basketball player
- Billy Gardell (1987), comedian and actor (star of Mike & Molly)
- Keith Gill (1990), sports administrator: Commissioner of the Sun Belt Conference
- Hank Green (1998), videoblogger and entrepreneur
- Donald C. Griffin, physicist
- John Hart, baseball executive (MLB)
- Scott Hutchinson (1974), professional football player
- Davey Johnson, baseball player and manager (MLB)
- Arielle Kebbel, actress
- Bill Kimber (1954), football player
- Kostya Kimlat, magician
- Kilo Kish (2008), American rapper and visual artist
- Beth Littleford, comedian and actress
- Dax McCarty, soccer player – attended Winter Park from 2001 to 2003
- Paul McGowan, football player (1987 Butkus Award Winner)
- Bret Munsey, football coach (Arena)
- Jo Ann Pflug (1958), actress
- Stan Pietkiewicz, basketball player (NBA)
- Wes Platt (1984), journalist and computer game designer
- Wayne Radloff (1979), football player
- Austin Rivers (2011), basketball player, Minnesota Timberwolves (NBA)
- Jeremiah Rivers (2006), basketball player
- Ben Rock, filmmaker
- Aidan Warner (2023), college football quarterback
