= Battle of the Blues =

Battle of the Blues may refer to:

- Battle of the Blues (boat race), an annual rowing race between the Cambridge University Boat Club and Oxford University Boat Club
- Battle of the Blues (Colombo), an annual cricket match between Royal College, Colombo and S. Thomas' College, Mount Lavinia, played since 1879 in Sri Lanka
- Battle of the Blues, an annual cricket match between St. Thomas' College, Matara and St. Servatius' College, Matara, played since 1900 in Sri Lanka
- Battle of the Blues (Kandy), an annual cricket match between Trinity College, Kandy and St. Anthony's College, Kandy, played since 1914 in Sri Lanka
- Battle of the Blues (North Carolina), an annual sporting competition between Duke Blue Devils and North Carolina Tar Heels
- Battle of the Blue, an annual college football rivalry game between the University of Delaware Fightin' Blue Hens and Villanova University Wildcats
