= Victory Bell (Duke–North Carolina) =

Trophy for the Duke–North Carolina football game

- Duke Blue Devils North Carolina Tar Heels
- First meeting: November 27, 1888; Duke 16, North Carolina 0
- Latest meeting: October 17, 2026; North Carolina 24, Duke 20
- Next meeting: 2027
- Trophy: Victory Bell

Statistics
- Total meetings: 113 (78 trophy meetings)
- All-time series: North Carolina leads, 65–42–4
- Largest victory: North Carolina, 50–0 (1959)
- Longest win streak: North Carolina, 13 (1990–2002)
- Current win streak: North Carolina, 1 (2026–present)

Locations in Durham and Chapel Hill.

The Victory Bell is the traveling trophy given to the winner of the annual football game between the Duke University Blue Devils and the University of North Carolina Tar Heels. The game was worth two points in the now-defunct, yearlong Carlyle Cup between the two schools.

== History ==
North Carolina and Duke first met in football in 1888, and the series has been renewed annually since 1922.

In the fall of 1948, UNC Head Cheerleader Norman Sper along with Loring Jones of Duke, likely inspired by other traveling trophies in college football, came up with the idea for the Victory Bell. Jones designed the frame and Sper obtained an old railway bell from the Southern Railway. North Carolina won possession of the first-ever Victory Bell game with a 20–0 shutout victory at Kenan Memorial Stadium in 1948.

At one time, the series was every bit as heated as the basketball rivalry between the two schools. But in the 40 years from 1970 to 2009, Duke only managed 7 wins, including a series record streak of 13 consecutive Carolina wins from 1990 through 2002.

However, this rivalry has been revived in recent years as Duke has again become competitive in the rivalry, with both teams having won five games each from 2010 through 2019.

Duke victories in the 2012 and 2013 games marked the first time Duke had won consecutive games in the series since winning three straight from 1987 to 1989.

After consecutive North Carolina victories in 2014 and 2015, Duke matched its longest winning streak in the last 30 years with wins in 2016, 2017 and 2018.

This streak for Duke was broken on October 26, 2019 as Carolina clinched a 20–17 victory when Chazz Surratt picked off Deon Jackson’s trick-play pass at the goal line with 14 seconds left.

With Carolina's 47–45 double overtime victory on November 11, 2023, Carolina posted five consecutive victories in the series. Duke would end Carolina's winning streak the next season with the second-largest comeback in program history, rallying from a 20-0 second-half deficit to win 21-20. Another dramatic Duke win would follow in 2025, as the Blue Devils ran a fake field goal that set up the game-winning touchdown in a 32-25 decision at Kenan Stadium. In 2026, former NFL Head Coach Bill Belichick would win his first Victory Bell as North Carolina's Head Coach. They did so after blowing a 17-0 lead, but coming back with a 4th quarter drive with less than 2 minutes remaining to win 24-20 on the road.

== Traditions ==
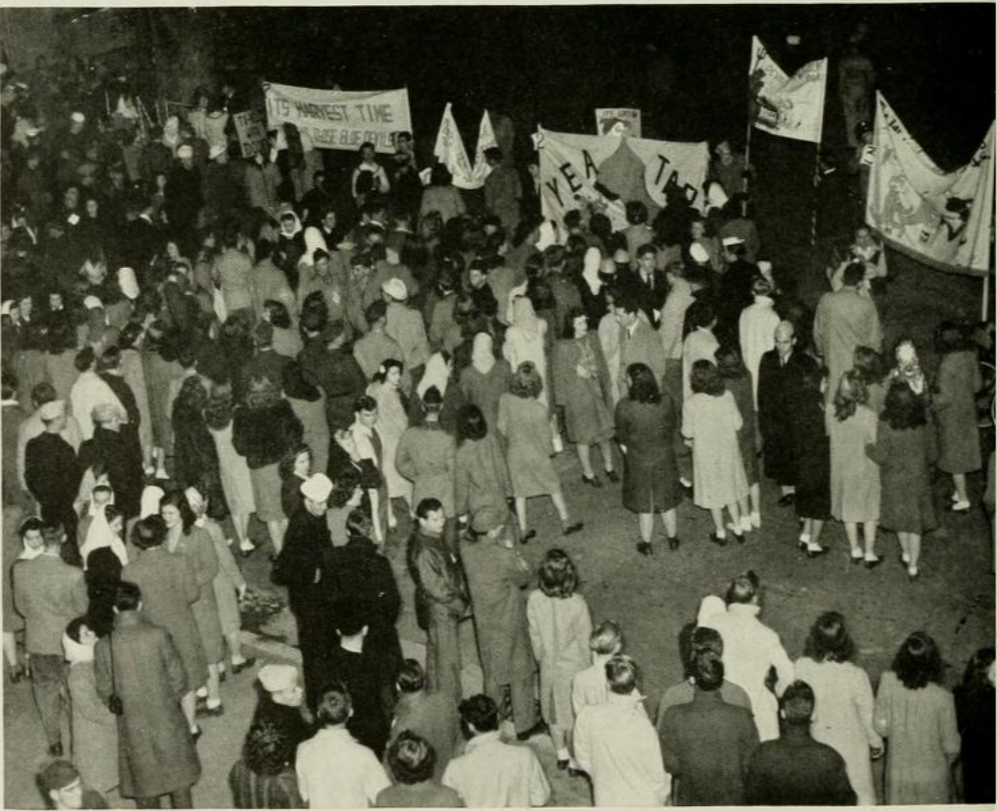
Pep rally at the University of North Carolina at Chapel Hill prior to the 1944 game

It has been a tradition as of late for the winner to spray-paint the platform of the trophy to match their school colors--Carolina blue for North Carolina and royal blue for Duke. After losing the Victory Bell in 2003, North Carolina came back the next year and beat Duke 40–17 in Duke's Wallace Wade Stadium. After the conclusion of the game, North Carolina football players immediately spray-painted the platform Carolina blue, leaving large amounts of Carolina blue paint residue on the track of the stadium. Whenever North Carolina has been in possession of the Victory Bell, cheerleaders wheel it out while ringing the bell at the same time the live ram mascot, Rameses, is brought out onto the field. The bell is also displayed in front of the students' section.

== Game results ==
While the two schools agree that North Carolina leads the series, they do not agree on the overall record. North Carolina claims an all-time lead of 65–42–4; Duke claims North Carolina leads 64-43–4. The dispute centers around an 1889 game in which both North Carolina and Trinity stayed home because they believed they were the home team. As a result, both schools claim the game as a win by forfeit, 1–0. Most neutral recordkeepers credit the game to North Carolina.

Both schools agree that North Carolina vacated its wins in 2008 and 2009. Both schools also agree that North Carolina leads the series since the introduction of the Victory Bell with a record of 49–27–1, with two vacated North Carolina wins.

Note: Duke was known as Trinity College until 1924.

Duke victories	North Carolina victories	Tie games	Vacated wins

No.	Date	Location	Winning team		Losing team	
1	November 27, 1888	Durham, NC	Trinity	16	North Carolina	0
2	May 8, 1889	Raleigh, NC	Trinity	25	North Carolina	17
3	1889	Chapel Hill, NC	North Carolina	1	Trinity	0
4	November 20, 1891	Chapel Hill, NC	Trinity	6	North Carolina	4
5	November 12, 1892	Durham, NC	North Carolina	24	Trinity	0
6	October 28, 1893	Durham, NC	Trinity	6	North Carolina	4
7	October 24, 1894	Chapel Hill, NC	North Carolina	28	Trinity	0
8	October 12, 1922	Chapel Hill, NC	North Carolina	20	Trinity	0
9	October 12, 1923	Durham, NC	North Carolina	14	Trinity	6
10	October 11, 1924	Chapel Hill, NC	North Carolina	6	Duke	0
11	October 10, 1925	Durham, NC	North Carolina	41	Duke	0
12	October 16, 1926	Chapel Hill, NC	North Carolina	6	Duke	0
13	November 19, 1927	Durham, NC	North Carolina	18	Duke	0
14	December 8, 1928	Chapel Hill, NC	North Carolina	14	Duke	7
15	December 7, 1929	Durham, NC	North Carolina	48	Duke	7
16	December 6, 1930	Chapel Hill, NC	Tie	0	Tie	0
17	November 21, 1931	Durham, NC	Tie	0	Tie	0
18	November 19, 1932	Chapel Hill, NC	Duke	7	North Carolina	0
19	November 18, 1933	Durham, NC	Duke	21	North Carolina	0
20	November 17, 1934	Chapel Hill, NC	North Carolina	7	Duke	0
21	November 16, 1935	Durham, NC	Duke	25	North Carolina	0
22	November 14, 1936	Chapel Hill, NC	#13 Duke	27	North Carolina	7
23	November 13, 1937	Durham, NC	North Carolina	14	#8 Duke	6
24	October 29, 1938	Chapel Hill, NC	#11 Duke	14	North Carolina	0
25	November 18, 1939	Durham, NC	#13 Duke	13	#7 North Carolina	3
26	November 16, 1940	Chapel Hill, NC	North Carolina	6	#12 Duke	3
27	November 15, 1941	Durham, NC	#3 Duke	20	North Carolina	0
28	November 14, 1942	Chapel Hill, NC	Tie	13	Tie	13
29	October 16, 1943	Durham, NC	Duke	14	North Carolina	7
30	November 20, 1943	Chapel Hill, NC	#6 Duke	27	North Carolina	6
31	November 25, 1944	Chapel Hill, NC	#11 Duke	33	North Carolina	0
32	November 24, 1945	Durham, NC	#15 Duke	14	North Carolina	7
33	November 23, 1946	Chapel Hill, NC	#14 North Carolina	22	Duke	7
34	November 22, 1947	Durham, NC	#13 North Carolina	21	Duke	0
35	November 20, 1948	Chapel Hill, NC	#5 North Carolina	20	Duke	0
36	November 19, 1949	Durham, NC	North Carolina	21	Duke	20
37	November 25, 1950	Chapel Hill, NC	Duke	7	North Carolina	0
38	November 24, 1951	Durham, NC	Duke	19	North Carolina	7
39	November 22, 1952	Chapel Hill, NC	#20 Duke	34	North Carolina	0
40	November 28, 1953	Durham, NC	Duke	35	North Carolina	20
41	November 27, 1954	Chapel Hill, NC	#20 Duke	47	North Carolina	12
42	November 26, 1955	Durham, NC	#18 Duke	6	North Carolina	0
43	November 24, 1956	Chapel Hill, NC	Duke	21	North Carolina	6
44	November 23, 1957	Durham, NC	North Carolina	21	#11 Duke	13
45	November 22, 1958	Chapel Hill, NC	Duke	7	#17 North Carolina	6
46	November 21, 1959	Durham, NC	North Carolina	50	Duke	0
47	November 19, 1960	Chapel Hill, NC	North Carolina	7	#6 Duke	6
48	November 18, 1961	Durham, NC	Duke	6	North Carolina	3
49	November 24, 1962	Chapel Hill, NC	Duke	16	North Carolina	14
50	November 28, 1963	Durham, NC	North Carolina	16	Duke	14
51	November 21, 1964	Chapel Hill, NC	North Carolina	21	Duke	15
52	November 20, 1965	Durham, NC	Duke	34	North Carolina	7
53	November 19, 1966	Chapel Hill, NC	Duke	41	North Carolina	25
54	November 18, 1967	Durham, NC	North Carolina	20	Duke	9
55	November 23, 1968	Chapel Hill, NC	North Carolina	25	Duke	14
56	November 22, 1969	Durham, NC	Duke	17	North Carolina	13
57	November 21, 1970	Chapel Hill, NC	North Carolina	59	Duke	34
58	November 20, 1971	Durham, NC	North Carolina	38	Duke	0
59	November 18, 1972	Chapel Hill, NC	#16 North Carolina	14	Duke	0
60	November 24, 1973	Durham, NC	Duke	27	North Carolina	10
61	November 23, 1974	Chapel Hill, NC	North Carolina	14	Duke	13
62	November 22, 1975	Durham, NC	Tie	17	Tie	17
63	November 20, 1976	Chapel Hill, NC	North Carolina	39	Duke	38
64	November 19, 1977	Durham, NC	#18 North Carolina	16	Duke	3
65	November 25, 1978	Chapel Hill, NC	North Carolina	16	Duke	15
66	November 24, 1979	Durham, NC	North Carolina	37	Duke	16
67	November 22, 1980	Chapel Hill, NC	#15 North Carolina	44	Duke	21
68	November 21, 1981	Durham, NC	#12 North Carolina	31	Duke	10
69	November 20, 1982	Durham, NC	Duke	23	North Carolina	17
70	November 19, 1983	Chapel Hill, NC	North Carolina	34	Duke	27
71	November 24, 1984	Durham, NC	North Carolina	17	Duke	15
72	November 23, 1985	Chapel Hill, NC	Duke	23	North Carolina	21
73	November 22, 1986	Durham, NC	North Carolina	42	Duke	35
74	November 21, 1987	Chapel Hill, NC	Duke	25	North Carolina	10
75	November 19, 1988	Durham, NC	Duke	35	North Carolina	29
76	November 18, 1989	Chapel Hill, NC	#25 Duke	41	North Carolina	0
77	November 17, 1990	Durham, NC	North Carolina	24	Duke	22
78	November 23, 1991	Chapel Hill, NC	North Carolina	47	Duke	14
79	November 21, 1992	Durham, NC	#21 North Carolina	31	Duke	28
80	November 26, 1993	Chapel Hill, NC	#13 North Carolina	38	Duke	24
81	November 19, 1994	Durham, NC	North Carolina	41	#24 Duke	40
82	November 18, 1995	Chapel Hill, NC	North Carolina	28	Duke	24
83	November 23, 1996	Durham, NC	#13 North Carolina	27	Duke	10
84	November 22, 1997	Chapel Hill, NC	#8 North Carolina	50	Duke	14
85	November 21, 1998	Durham, NC	North Carolina	28	Duke	6
86	November 20, 1999	Chapel Hill, NC	North Carolina	38	Duke	0
87	November 18, 2000	Durham, NC	North Carolina	59	Duke	21
88	November 17, 2001	Chapel Hill, NC	North Carolina	52	Duke	17
89	November 23, 2002	Durham, NC	North Carolina	23	Duke	21
90	November 22, 2003	Chapel Hill, NC	Duke	30	North Carolina	22
91	November 20, 2004	Durham, NC	North Carolina	40	Duke	17
92	November 19, 2005	Chapel Hill, NC	North Carolina	24	Duke	21
93	November 25, 2006	Durham, NC	North Carolina	45	Duke	44
94	November 24, 2007	Chapel Hill, NC	North Carolina	20	Duke	14
95	November 29, 2008	Durham, NC	North Carolina^{†}	28	Duke	20
96	November 7, 2009	Chapel Hill, NC	North Carolina^{†}	19	Duke	6
97	November 27, 2010	Durham, NC	North Carolina	24	Duke	19
98	November 26, 2011	Chapel Hill, NC	North Carolina	37	Duke	21
99	October 20, 2012	Durham, NC	Duke	33	North Carolina	30
100	November 30, 2013	Chapel Hill, NC	#24 Duke	27	North Carolina	25
101	November 20, 2014	Durham, NC	North Carolina	45	#25 Duke	20
102	November 7, 2015	Chapel Hill, NC	#21 North Carolina	66	Duke	31
103	November 10, 2016	Durham, NC	Duke	28	#15 North Carolina	27
104	September 23, 2017	Chapel Hill, NC	Duke	27	North Carolina	17
105	November 10, 2018	Durham, NC	Duke	42	North Carolina	35
106	October 26, 2019	Chapel Hill, NC	North Carolina	20	Duke	17
107	November 7, 2020	Durham, NC	North Carolina	56	Duke	24
108	October 2, 2021	Chapel Hill, NC	North Carolina	38	Duke	7
109	October 15, 2022	Durham, NC	North Carolina	38	Duke	35
110	November 11, 2023	Chapel Hill, NC	#24 North Carolina	47	Duke	45^{2OT}
111	September 28, 2024	Durham, NC	Duke	21	North Carolina	20
112	November 22, 2025	Chapel Hill, NC	Duke	32	North Carolina	25
113	October 17, 2026	Durham, NC	North Carolina	24	Duke	20
Series: North Carolina leads 65–42–4
† North Carolina vacated wins as part of NCAA penalties

== See also ==
- List of NCAA college football rivalry games
- List of most-played college football series in NCAA Division I
