= Will Blythe =

- Occupation(s): Author; Writer; Editor of Byliner.com
- Website: about.me/WillBlythe

Will Blythe is a magazine writer and book author living in New York City. He is the editor of Byliner.com, a former literary editor at Esquire magazine, and a contributing editor for Harper's and Mirabella. He writes for many other periodicals, including The New Yorker, Rolling Stone, Sports Illustrated, Elle, and the Oxford American.

== Early life and education ==
Blythe was born in 1957 in North Carolina. He attended the University of North Carolina at Chapel Hill.

== Career ==
His short story "The Taming Power of the Small" was anthologized in the Best American Short Stories for 1988 and adapted into a 1995 short film starring David Morse and Treat Williams. Blythe's 2006 book, To Hate Like This Is to Be Happy Forever, follows the author through a season rooting for his beloved University of North Carolina Tar Heels basketball team and examining his hatred of the school's rival, Duke University (see Carolina-Duke rivalry). The New York Times describes Blythe thus: "... he writes amusingly, self-deprecatingly and often beautifully. {...} Fans of college basketball will wish that all sportswriters possessed Blythe's ability to describe a game, to translate its tension and render its action." Blythe is also the editor of Why I Write: Thoughts on the Craft of Fiction, published in 1999, and co-editor of Lust, Violence, Sin, Magic: Sixty Years of Esquire Fiction, published in 1993. He writes regularly for the New York Times Book Review.
