= Carolina–Duke rivalry =

American college sports rivalry

North Carolina–Duke rivalry
- North Carolina Tar Heels Duke Blue Devils
- Sport: College basketball
- First meeting: January 24, 1920; North Carolina 36, Duke (Trinity College) 25
- Latest meeting: March 7, 2026; Duke 76, North Carolina 61

Statistics
- Total meetings: 267
- All-time series: North Carolina leads, 146–121
- Largest victory: North Carolina: 53 points (1921); Duke: 35 points (1964)
- Longest win streak: North Carolina, 16 (1921–28)
- Current win streak: Duke, 1 (2026–present)

Locations in Durham and Chapel Hill

The Carolina–Duke rivalry, also referred to as The Battle of the Blues by some fans and sports commentators,refers to the sports rivalry between the University of North Carolina Tar Heels and Duke University Blue Devils, particularly in the sport of basketball. It is considered one of the most intense rivalries in all of US-sports; a poll conducted by ESPN in 2000 ranked the basketball rivalry as the third greatest North American sports rivalry, and Sports Illustrated on Campus named it the #1 "Hottest Rivalry" in college basketball and the #2 rivalry overall in its November 18, 2003 issue. The intensity of the rivalry is augmented for many reasons. One reason is the proximity of the two universities—they are located only ten miles apart along U.S. Highway 15–501 (also known as Tobacco Road which also includes nearby rivalries with the NC State Wolfpack and Wake Forest Demon Deacons) or eight miles apart in straight-line distance. In addition, Duke is a private university whereas Carolina is a public school; the vastly different funding structures and cultures between the two further contribute to the intensity of the rivalry. One of the biggest reasons for this rivalry lies in the success of their respective basketball programs; almost every year, at least one of the schools is a contender to win the national championship. North Carolina leads the rivalry 146–121.

== Men's basketball ==
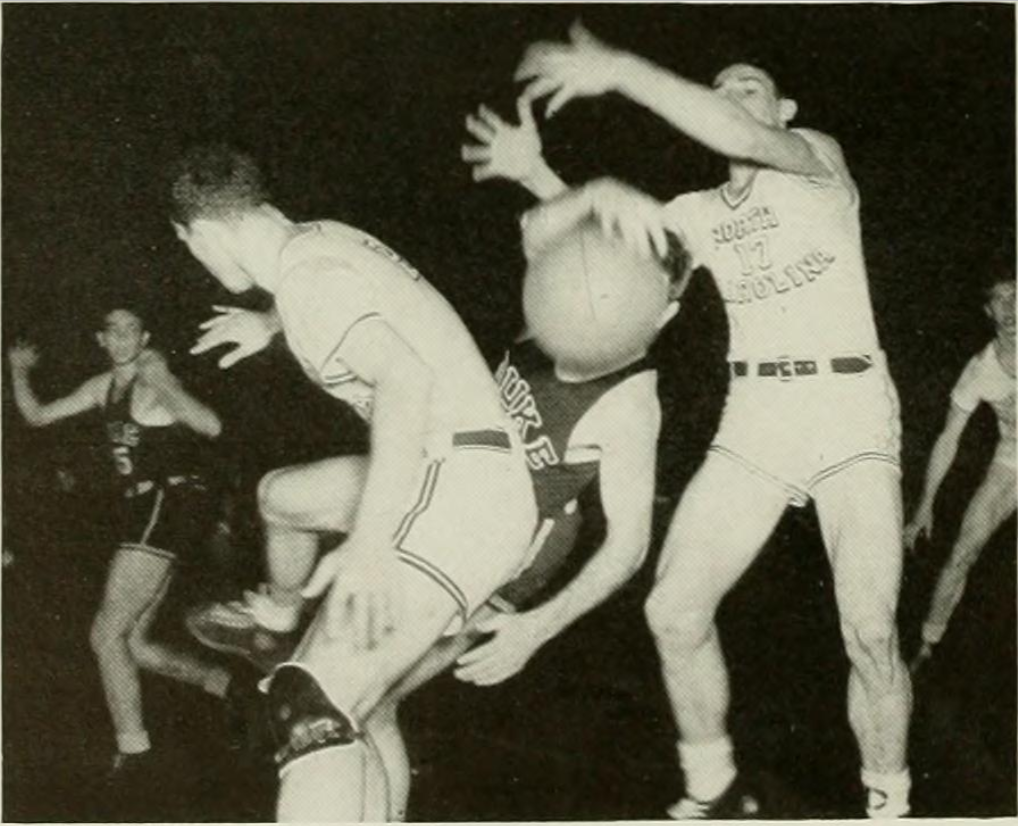
A scramble during a game in the 1944–45 season

Carolina and Duke played their first basketball game on January 24, 1920. The two teams have met at least twice a year since then. The games frequently determine the Atlantic Coast Conference (ACC) champion; since the ACC's founding in 1953, Carolina and Duke have combined to win or share 49 ACC regular season titles (77.7% of the total) and 38 tournament titles (59.4% of the total), including 15 of 16 from 1996 to 2011. The final game of the regular season for both schools alternates between Chapel Hill and Durham and has been played in Cameron Indoor Stadium since 1940 and the Dean E. Smith Center since 1986.

The Carolina–Duke rivalry is all the more intense because the two schools have consistently been among the nation's elite men's basketball teams for most of the last 40 years. Both schools are also two of the most victorious programs in NCAA men's basketball history; Carolina is third on the list of all-time winningest programs in Division I history, while Duke is fourth. Carolina has won six NCAA championships and appeared in a record 21 Final Fours,while Duke has won five NCAA championships and has appeared in 18 Final Fours. Additionally, Carolina was also retroactively awarded a national championship by the Helms Athletic Foundation in 1942 for their undefeated 1924 season.

Combining for eleven national championships over the last 36 years, Duke and Carolina have captured 28% of the national championships, or greater than one every four years. Over the past 18 years, one of the two teams has been the AP pre-season #1 ranked team in the country 8 times (44% of the time). Since 1977–78, Duke or Carolina has been in the pre-season top three 28 times (70%). Over the entirety of the AP poll (the past 69 years), the teams have been in the pre-season top four 69% of the time. Over this same period, one has been pre-season #1 18 times, making it an almost 3 in 10 chance that Duke or North Carolina starts the year at #1 in the last 50+ years. One of the two teams has peaked at AP #1 in 32 separate seasons since 1977, a 7 in 10 chance that Duke or Carolina peaked as the top-ranked team in the country at some point in the season since 1977.

=== History ===
Though the two schools have always had the great emotion born of familiarity and proximity, some of the earliest roots of the modern basketball rivalry occurred in the early 1960s when Art Heyman withdrew from his commitment to play for North Carolina in order to commit to playing for Duke. After a brawl between the two universities' freshman teams during the 1959–60 season involving Heyman and North Carolina's Dieter Krause, tensions heightened further during a February 4, 1961, varsity game when a brawl occurred initiated by Heyman and North Carolina's Larry Brown, which resulted in suspensions for both players. The rivalry reached unprecedented heights in the mid-1980s under head coaches Dean Smith of North Carolina and Mike Krzyzewski of Duke, thanks to the emergence of cable channels such as ESPN and the increasing coverage of the ACC in national broadcasts by the three major networks, giving a vast national audience more opportunities to witness the two teams and their coaches. Indeed, the two teams have been fixtures on national television since the early 1980s, and their final regular season clash has been nationally televised for most of that time.

When Smith retired after the 1997 season, he held what was at the time the record for most wins by an NCAA Division I men's head coach, with 879 wins. On December 29, 2010, against the University of North Carolina at Greensboro, Duke head coach Mike Krzyzewski passed coach Smith with his 880th win to become the 2nd all-time winningest coach in Division I men's basketball, (a mark he has since surpassed). In 1982, with players Michael Jordan, Sam Perkins and James Worthy, coach Smith won his first national championship and second overall for UNC that year. In 1991 Duke won its first national championship and then with most of their team returning, won another national championship in 1992.

North Carolina then won the championship the next year in 1993. Since then, Duke won the national championship in 2001, 2010 and 2015 while North Carolina won national championships in 2005, 2009, and 2017. In 2011, Krzyzewski became the new holder of the record for most career wins by a D-I men's coach, surpassing his mentor Bob Knight (who had surpassed Smith in 2007). On January 25, 2015, Krzyzewski also became the first NCAA Men's Division 1 Basketball head coach to reach 1,000 career wins after Duke defeated St Johns in Madison Square Garden 77–68. On February 16, 2019, Krzyzewski won his 1,123rd game to become the all-time winningest coach in college basketball history at any level (men's or women's), passing Harry Statham of Division II McKendree University.

After Smith's retirement in 1997, North Carolina suffered through three coaching changes (from Dean Smith to Bill Guthridge to Matt Doherty to Roy Williams) between 1997 and 2003. The six seasons between Bill Guthridge and Matt Doherty from 1997 to 2003 Duke won 13 of 17 games against North Carolina and some said that the rivalry was on the decline. However, with the arrival of North Carolina's alumnus Roy Williams as head coach in 2003, North Carolina won six regular season titles in eight years (2005, 2007, 2008, 2009, 2011, 2012), won the ACC tournament in back to back years in 2007 and 2008 and won its fourth, fifth, and sixth NCAA championships in 2005, 2009, and 2017 respectively. North Carolina also won 6 of 8 games against Duke from 2005 to 2009. Erik Spanberg of The Christian Science Monitor even argued in 2008 that the rivalry had tilted towards North Carolina in recent years.

However, between 2009 and 2017 Duke won 13 of 18 games against North Carolina including 3 season sweeps over North Carolina in 2010, 2013 and 2015. During the 2009–2010 season, Duke won the regular season finale by 32 points, which was the second largest Duke win in series history. Following that game, Duke went on to win a fourth National title in 2010 and a fifth title in 2015.

In 2017, UNC won its 6th national title. Since then, Duke and North Carolina have been splitting wins every year. In 2022, North Carolina defeated Duke in Krzyzewski's final home game in Cameron, returning the favor after Duke defeated North Carolina in Krzyzewski's last game at the Dean E. Smith Center a month earlier. In their highly anticipated third matchup, North Carolina defeated Duke in Krzyzewski's final game ever in the 2022 Final Four.

Former Esquire editor and author (and North Carolina graduate) Will Blythe argues that the rivalry's passion can be attributed greatly to class and culture in the South.

To legions of otherwise reasonable adults, it is a conflict that surpasses sports; it is locals against outsiders, elitists against populists, even good against evil… The rivalry may be a way of aligning oneself with larger philosophic ideals — of choosing teams in life — a tradition of partisanship that reveals the pleasures and even the necessity of hatred.

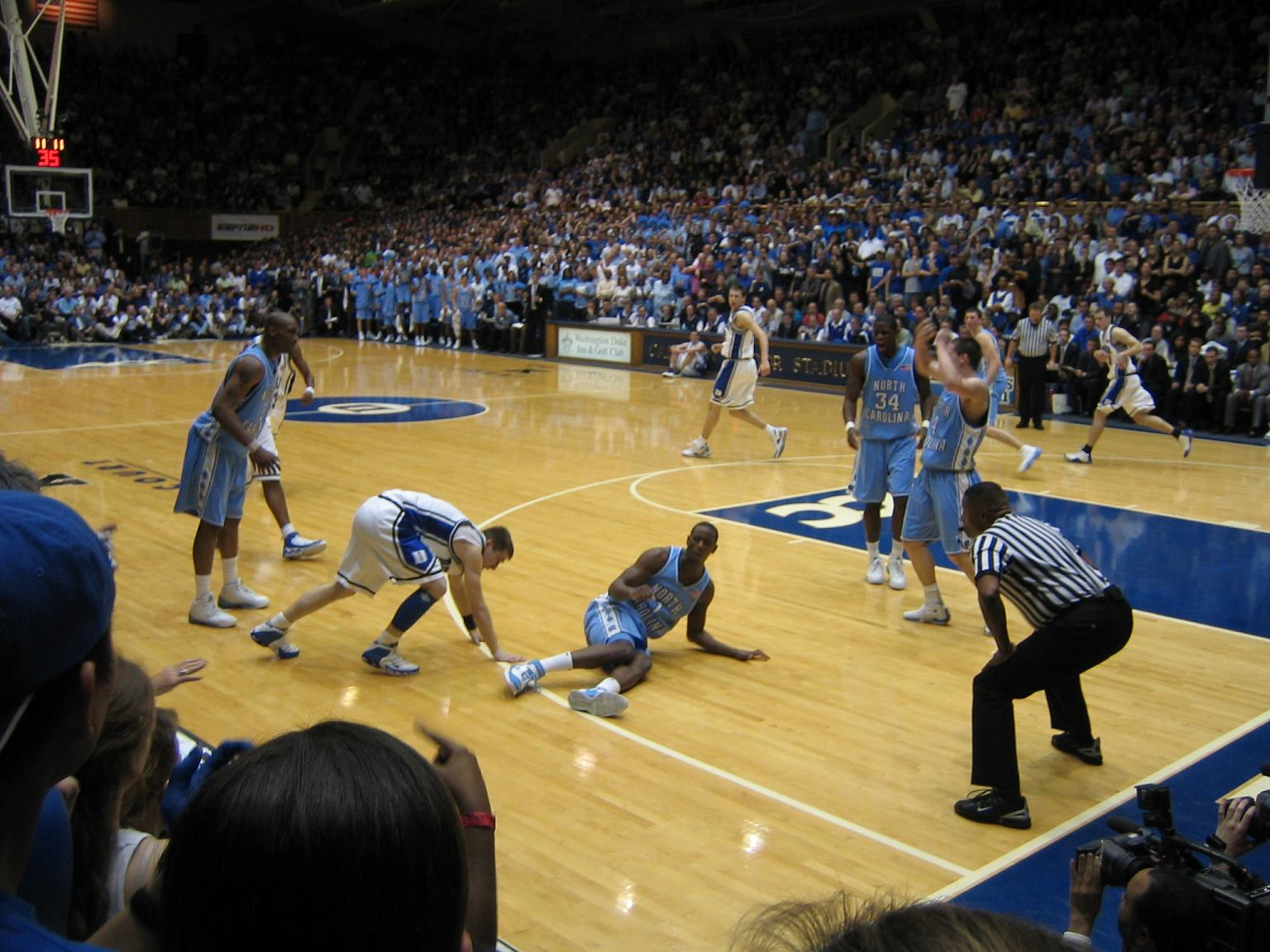
The March 4, 2006 game was the most watched college basketball game in ESPN history.

The rivalry has been the subject of various books and articles, including To Hate Like This Is to Be Happy Forever by Blythe and Blue Blood by Art Chansky.

Further illustrating the intensity of the rivalry, U.S. Representative Brad Miller, a die-hard Carolina fan, told an Associated Press writer in 2012, "I have said very publicly that if Duke was playing against the Taliban, then I'd have to pull for the Taliban."

==== NCAA tournament/postseason NIT ====
Prior to their meeting in the 2022 NCAA Final Four, North Carolina and Duke's only other postseason meeting was at the 1971 National Invitation Tournament, with North Carolina winning 73–67 in the semifinals at Madison Square Garden. Under current bracket rules, if both teams qualify for the NCAA tournament, the earliest both teams would be able to meet in the NCAA tournament is the regional semifinals (Sweet Sixteen) due to facing each other at least twice per season. If both teams meet three or more times (typically by meeting one another in the ACC tournament), then the earliest both teams can meet in the NCAA tournament is the Regional Finals (Elite Eight).

In 1991, the teams came within one game of playing each other for the national championship, as both advanced to that year's Final Four at the Hoosier Dome in Indianapolis. Chansky writes in Blue Blood that as Carolina and Duke students lined up for tickets, the Carolina students chanted "0-for-4!" at their Duke counterparts (referring to Duke's previous Final Four runs) while Duke responded with "Long time, no see!" (as this was Carolina's first Final Four since the 1982 national title season). In the first semifinal, North Carolina was upset 79–73 by a Kansas team coached by Roy Williams, who would later return to Chapel Hill to take the head coaching job. Some Duke fans had already arrived for their team's game by the time Dean Smith was ejected for arguing with the officials, and Chansky writes that they were ecstatic at the ejection, waving their hands and yelling, "See ya!" as they normally did at Cameron for a player or coach who was ejected or in foul trouble.

Below, in the Duke locker room, the Blue Devils were preparing for a rematch of the 1990 title game with UNLV in their semifinal. UNLV had won that game by 30 points and had come in undefeated in 1991, with many wondering if they were the best college basketball team ever. When the Carolina-Kansas result news got through, Mike Krzyzewski asked the team if they felt it was okay to lose since that meant they would do no worse than the Tar Heels, and some nodded. Krzyzewski understood but then added, "Flush it. Let's go kick their ass." Duke then stunned the sports world by defeating UNLV 79–77 and then went one better by beating Kansas 72–65 in the championship game to win its first national title. Chansky writes that one UNC athletic department staffer in Indianapolis was so distraught that he did not leave his hotel room the day after the national championship game, while when Duke arrived back in Durham, Krzyzewski is said to have asked the team at a turnoff to Chapel Hill if the team wanted to cruise down Franklin Street. In the wake of the Final Four, when talking about how close the two rivals came to meeting for the national championship, Krzyzewski said that he never wanted to see it happen because regardless of who won, the pain of losing that game would be unbearable for the defeated school and its fans.

=== Memorable games and incidents ===
==== March 2, 1968: #10 Duke 87, #3 North Carolina 86 (3OT) ====
At Duke Indoor Stadium, Durham
Duke defeated North Carolina 87–86 in triple overtime at Duke Indoor Stadium (later renamed Cameron Indoor Stadium) when seldom used Duke junior Fred Lind erupted for 16 points, 9 rebounds, and 3 blocks, having previously scored 21 points during his entire career. When Duke All-American center Mike Lewis picked up his third foul in the first half (and Warren Chapman, his backup, had a k and one Tar Heel fouled out of the game) with about five minutes left in regulation when Duke was down by five, and Lind returned to the court. Lind went on to carry the Blue Devils in the three overtimes, blocking North Carolina's shot attempt at the end of regulation, making two free throws at the end of the first overtime, and knocking down a 15-foot jumper at the buzzer to send it into a third overtime. Lind would be celebrated for the action by being carried to Duke's main quad.

==== March 25, 1971: #13 North Carolina 73, Duke 67 ====
At Madison Square Garden, New York City (National Invitation Tournament Semifinals)
The first-ever postseason meeting and the only one before 2022. North Carolina not only won the game but also went on to win the 1971 NIT after beating Georgia Tech 84–66, while Duke lost the third-place game to St. Bonaventure. UNC's Bill Chamberlain was named tournament MVP after scoring 87 points in the tournament including 34 against the Yellow Jackets.

==== March 2, 1974: #4 North Carolina 96, Duke 92 (OT) ====
At Carmichael Auditorium, Chapel Hill
8 Points in 17 Seconds. Duke led UNC 86–78 with 17 seconds left. Despite the deficit and despite the fact that the game took place prior to the implementation of the three-point shot, Carolina rallied with a pair of free throws by Bobby Jones, then baskets by John Kuester and Jones after a steal by Walter Davis and a turnover on inbounds attempts. After Duke's Pete Kramer missed the front end of a one-and-one, UNC tied the score on Davis' 30-foot bank shot as time expired. The game went into overtime, where UNC prevailed, 96–92.

==== January 3, 1975: Duke 99, #8 North Carolina 96 (OT) ====
At Greensboro Coliseum, Greensboro (Big Four Tournament)
In a Big Four Tournament matchup between North Carolina and Duke, the two teams played a see-saw game until a 10–0 Duke run in the second half made the score 64–56. North Carolina eventually tied the score at 70–70 with four minutes to go. Duke went back up by four with 1:41 to go, but a driving layup by Phil Ford with eight seconds to go in regulation tied the score at 82 and extended the game to overtime. The Blue Devils got quick baskets from Kevin Billerman and Bob Fleischer to open the overtime but the Tar Heels answered and eventually took the lead, 89–88, on two Ford free throws with two minutes to go. Duke answered with four straight points and North Carolina came back to tie the score at 92, and then Tate Armstrong converted a three-point play to put the Blue Devils ahead for good. The teams combined for eight points in the final 20 seconds of the game, but Duke's free throw shooting gave them the 99–96 win. Fleischer led Duke with 26 points and Phil Ford scored 22 for North Carolina.

==== February 24, 1979: #6 Duke 47, #4 North Carolina 40 ====
External videos
- Video highlights from Duke University Libraries on YouTube

At Cameron Indoor Stadium, Durham
Jim Spanarkel's Senior Day game turned into one of the strangest afternoons in ACC basketball history as Duke held Carolina scoreless for a half before knocking off the No. 4-ranked Tar Heels 47–40. Dean Smith resorted to the four corners offense and the Tar Heels held the ball throughout the first half, but Duke led 7–0 as Spanarkel forced two turnovers, assisted on a basket to Mike Gminski and scored the last bucket of the half on a short jumper. (Smith later said, "It should have been 2–0, or something like that, at the half.") Carolina's only two shots of the first half were air balls, that resulted in the first-ever chants of "Air ball . . . Air ball!" from the Cameron Crazies. Spanarkel added 15 points in the second half and finished with a game-high 17, hitting 8-of-9 field goal attempts. The win allowed Duke to tie North Carolina for the ACC regular season title.

Duke coach Bill Foster wasn't amused by Smith's tactics in the first half and the next day said, "I've been doing this a long time, but during the first half last night I began to think maybe I've been doing it for too long." He then added this infamous dig: "I thought Naismith invented basketball, not Dean Smith."

==== December 5, 1980: #10 North Carolina 78, Duke 76 ====
At Greensboro Coliseum, Greensboro (Big Four Tournament)
Carolina led by as many as 11 in the first half of the Big Four Tournament contest before Duke trimmed the lead to five at halftime. Carolina played much of the second half shorthanded as Al Wood and Sam Perkins got into foul trouble; Perkins would foul out with 7:55 to go. James Worthy did his best to pick up the slack, leading the Tar Heels with 26 points and hitting eight straight shots at one point in the second half. Nevertheless, Gene Banks was able to give Duke only its second lead of the game, 73–71, with 2:36 left. Carolina came back to tie it at 76. Future Tar Heel head coach Matt Doherty, a freshman at the time, was then fouled, and hit a free throw with 12 seconds remaining to provide the winning margin. A Jimmy Braddock free throw in the final second gave Carolina the 78–76 victory.

==== February 28, 1981: Duke 66, #11 North Carolina 65 (OT) ====
External videos
- Late-game video highlights on YouTube

At Cameron Indoor Stadium, Durham
Duke struggled in its first season under Coach Mike Krzyzewski, going 17–13 overall and 6–8 in the ACC. However, the Blue Devils' regular-season finale was one to remember. On Senior Night, Duke's Gene Banks put on a tuxedo and threw roses to the crowd at Cameron Indoor Stadium before the game. Carolina controlled the game early, then went scoreless over a four-minute stretch of the second half to allow Duke to take a 46–45 lead late in regulation. The Tar Heels fought back to go up 50–49, and the teams traded baskets until two Sam Perkins free throws gave Carolina a 58–56 lead with two seconds to play. Duke inbounded to midcourt and called time out with one second left. Banks took the inbounds pass and nailed a jumper at the buzzer to force overtime. The Blue Devils took a 62–59 lead early in the extra session, but Carolina rallied to take a 65–64 lead on the strength of an Al Wood jumper and two free throws by Mike Pepper. Duke's Vince Taylor misfired on a short jumper, but Banks rebounded and banked home the game-winner with 19 seconds left. Banks led Duke with 25 points, while Perkins scored 24 for Carolina. Perkins also had 10 assists.

==== March 3, 1984: #1 North Carolina 96, Duke 83 (2OT) ====
At Carmichael Auditorium, Chapel Hill
The final home game for Matt Doherty, Michael Jordan, and Sam Perkins was a memorable one for Tar Heels fans. Carolina looked to be finished when Duke's Mark Alarie converted a three-point play with 20 seconds to go in regulation and the Tar Heels missed a jumper that would have tied the game. However, after the Blue Devils missed the front end of a one-and-one, Matt Doherty took the inbounds pass the length of the court and hit a 15-footer with one second left to force overtime. The teams traded baskets during the first overtime and headed for the second extra session tied at 79. Michael Jordan opened the second overtime with an ally oop and a free throw, but Johnny Dawkins cut the North Carolina lead to 82–81 with a short jumper. Duke would get only one more basket as Jordan and Sam Perkins carried the Tar Heels to the 96–83 final, and Carolina became the first ACC team in 10 years to go undefeated in conference play (14–0). Alarie led all scorers with 28 points, while Jordan topped Carolina with 25.

==== March 10, 1984: #16 Duke 77, #1 North Carolina 75 ====
At Greensboro Coliseum, Greensboro (ACC tournament semifinals)
After losing two close games to Carolina in the regular season, Duke finally upset the Tar Heels in the semifinals of the ACC tournament. Johnny Dawkins and Tommy Amaker led the Blue Devils to a 40–32 halftime advantage. Nevertheless, Carolina went on a 12–2 run to open the second half, tying the score at 44 in a game that was close the rest of the way. David Henderson hit four late free throws to keep Duke in the lead, but Michael Jordan closed the gap to 77–75. Carolina regained possession with three seconds left in the game, but the Tar Heels' comeback bid ended with Matt Doherty's errant inbounds pass. Jordan led all scorers with 22 points, while Doherty scored 20 and grabbed 10 rebounds.

==== January 18, 1986: #1 North Carolina 95, #3 Duke 92 ====
External videos
- The opening ceremony for the Dean Smith Center at the start of the game on YouTube

At the Dean Smith Center, Chapel Hill
The number 1 ranked Tar Heels opened the brand new Dean Smith Center against the number 3 ranked Blue Devils with the winner possibly becoming the number 1 ranked team in the nation. North Carolina survived a late Blue Devil rally to win 95–92.

==== January 21, 1988: #9 Duke 70, #2 North Carolina 69 ====
At the Dean Smith Center, Chapel Hill
Duke opened the game with an 11–2 run and eventually led 29–15, but Carolina cut the lead to three before the Blue Devils took a 44–39 halftime lead. Carolina still trailed 55–44 with 12:53 left when J.R. Reid took over the game. Reid scored 14 of Carolina's final 16 points to help the Tar Heels tie the score at 69 with 1:24 to go. A Danny Ferry free throw with 52 seconds remaining provided the winning margin for Duke, but not before Carolina forced a turnover and failed to convert on four field goal attempts in the final 30 seconds. Kevin Strickland scored 22 points and Ferry added 19 for Duke, while Reid dropped in 27 for the Tar Heels. This would become the first of three Duke victories in a season sweep over Carolina in 1988, including the ACC tournament.

==== March 12, 1989: #9 North Carolina 77, #7 Duke 74 ====
At the Omni Coliseum, Atlanta, Georgia (ACC tournament championship)
In one of the most intense games in the rivalry's history, Carolina defeated Duke 77–74 in the ACC tournament final at the Omni in Atlanta to secure the Heels' first ACC tournament title in seven seasons. The teams had split the two regular season meetings; Carolina defeating top ranked and then undefeated Duke 91–71 in Cameron in January (a game notable for the infamous "J.R. Can't Reid" placard displayed by some Duke fans) then Duke returned the favor in Chapel Hill in the season finale, knocking off Carolina 88–86. Tensions between coaches Dean Smith and Mike Krzyzewski boiled over during Tournament week, stemming from the Reid sign in Durham in January, and by the time the two teams met in the conference championship, the game had developed the atmosphere of a heavyweight title fight. Carolina led for much of the game, including a 39–35 halftime lead, but never could pull away. Carolina's J.R. Reid, however, outplayed Duke's Naismith Award-finalist and ACC tournament MVP Danny Ferry. The game saw an incredible 49 fouls called between the two squads, and Carolina prevailed, but only when Ferry's 3/4 court shot rimmed out as time expired.

==== February 5, 1992: #9 North Carolina 75, #1 Duke 73 ====
At the Dean Smith Center, Chapel Hill
In a rough game between the Blue Devils and Tar Heels that featured blood and broken bones, Duke used an early 9–0 run to take a 16–11 lead with 12:55 to go in the first half. Hubert Davis' three-point play capped off a Carolina run to give the Tar Heels a 20–19 lead. The teams exchanged the lead 10 times before a Thomas Hill baseline jumper gave the Blue Devils a 39–38 halftime lead. The Tar Heels opened the second half with a 10–0 spurt, but then saw their offense disappear. Duke went five minutes before scoring a second-half basket but fought back with tough defense, holding Carolina without a field goal over the last 9 1/2 minutes of the game. Carolina hit 12 of 14 free throws during that stretch; including two by Derrick Phelps with 44.5 seconds remaining to give the Tar Heels a 75–73 lead. Christian Laettner had two shots to tie the game in the final 24 seconds, but missed both. However, the lasting image from this game had to be Carolina's Eric Montross who took a couple of rough elbows to the face and looked more like a boxer than a center as he sank two late free throws with blood streaming down his face. Bobby Hurley broke his foot during the game, but continued playing. Brian Davis led Duke with 16 points, while Hubert Davis scored 16 for Carolina. In Duke's 1991–92 season, where they became the first team since UCLA in 1972 and 1973 to repeat as national champions and also were ranked #1 all year long, North Carolina was one of only two teams (the other being Wake Forest in Winston-Salem) to beat the Blue Devils.

==== February 2, 1995: #2 North Carolina 102, Duke 100 (2OT) ====
External videos
- Jeff Capel's buzzer-beater to send the game to overtime on YouTube

At Cameron Indoor Stadium, Durham
With Mike Krzyzewski on leave of absence for the year, the Blue Devils suffered through their worst season in well over a decade. They seemed out-manned on their home court from the opening tip, falling behind 26–9 in the first half, highlighted by alley-oops by Carolina's Rasheed Wallace and a reverse jam by Jerry Stackhouse over two Blue Devils. However, Duke rallied in the second half and led by as much as 12, before North Carolina staged a rally of its own. The two squads exchanged leads four times at the end of regulation before heading into overtime. With three seconds left in the first overtime, Carolina led 95–92 and sent Serge Zwikker to the foul line with the chance to ice the game for the heavily favored Tar Heels. However Zwikker missed both free throws, setting up Duke's Jeff Capel for a running, 37-foot heave that tied the game as the buzzer sounded, sending Cameron into a state of euphoria. With the game still tied late in the second overtime, Donald Williams scored for the Heels and Jeff McInnis stole the inbounds pass for an easy layup, putting Carolina up 102–98. Duke answered with a basket of their own and after stopping the Tar Heels, had a chance to force a third overtime or win the game outright. Nevertheless, Steve Wojciechowski's jumper missed and Greg Newton's putback drew nothing but air, preserving Carolina's 102–100 victory.

==== January 31, 1996: #8 North Carolina 73, Duke 72 ====
At the Dean Smith Center, Chapel Hill
Duke took a 42–30 advantage into the locker room at halftime, and led 37–20 over Carolina with less than five minutes to go in the first half. Carolina managed to close the gap to 44–42 with 14:14 left in the game, but the Blue Devils stretched the lead back to 11 with 8:44 left. The Tar Heels fought back and pulled within one behind scoring from six different players over the next few minutes. Steve Wojciechowski hit a three-pointer to give Duke a 72–68 lead with 1:13 to go. Shammond Williams answered with a three to cut the Duke lead to one with 58 seconds left, and Carolina forced a turnover on the ensuing inbounds pass. Jeff McInnis drove the lane and fed Serge Zwikker, whose shot was blocked by Greg Newton, but Dante Calabria was there for the tip-in and a 73–72 Carolina lead. Duke's Ricky Price could not connect on a jumper at the buzzer, and the Tar Heels escaped.

==== February 28, 1998: #1 Duke 77, #3 North Carolina 75 ====
At Cameron Indoor Stadium, Durham
Just two months removed from a broken foot that most assumed would sideline him for the season, Duke freshman Elton Brand rallied the Blue Devils from a 64–47 second-half deficit with 12 minutes remaining to a 77–75 victory over Carolina. The victory earned Duke the ACC regular-season championship and Coach Mike Krzyzewski his 500th victory in the most memorable game of the college season. Duke tied the game at 75 on a slashing floater by sophomore Chris Carrawell with 2:00 remaining and took the lead for the first time on a driving basket by Roshown McLeod one minute later as the Carolina offense lapsed into a series of turnovers and errant shots. Both point guard Ed Cota and freshman center Brendan Haywood had a chance to tie the game from the free-throw line in the waning seconds, but both missed the first of two free throws, and the Tar Heels were unable to turn intentional misses on the second attempts into points.

==== February 3, 2000: #3 Duke 90, North Carolina 86 (OT) ====
At the Dean Smith Center, Chapel Hill
The Tar Heels were unranked coming into the game for the first time since 1990. Shane Battier scored 14 first-half points for Duke and Carolina turned the ball over 14 times to give the Blue Devils a 17-point halftime lead. Duke eventually took a 19-point lead early in the second half. Carolina then turned the tide down the stretch, scoring on 19 of its final 22 possessions, including a three-pointer by Joseph Forte with 5.2 seconds left to send the game to the extra period at 73. The Blue Devils scored on their first six possessions in overtime and got seven points from Carlos Boozer in the extra frame to hold on for the 90–86 victory.

==== March 4, 2001: #2 Duke 95, #4 North Carolina 81 ====
At the Dean Smith Center, Chapel Hill
Earlier in the year, Matt Doherty had won his first rivalry game as North Carolina coach (after returning from Notre Dame to succeed Bill Guthridge) 85–83 in Durham. Entering the game, Duke had lost starting center Carlos Boozer to a broken foot in their Senior Night loss to Maryland, which ultimately ruled him out until the Sweet Sixteen. Faced with a disadvantage inside as the Tar Heels still fielded Brendan Haywood and power forward Kris Lang, Mike Krzyzewski adopted an uptempo game plan designed to tire the Tar Heels out. Duke led at the half 42–40 but pulled away as Doherty was prompted to switch to a smaller lineup in the second half to match the Blue Devils' pace. Duke also won the rubber match in Atlanta in the ACC tournament championship 79–53 en route to the third national championship for both Krzyzewski and the school.

==== February 4, 2004: #1 Duke 83, #17 North Carolina 81 (OT) ====
At the Dean Smith Center, Chapel Hill
In the first game in the Carolina–Duke rivalry pitting Mike Krzyzewski against new UNC head coach Roy Williams, Chris Duhon's reverse layup with 6.5 seconds left in overtime gave Duke its 16th straight victory overall and fifth victory in the last six years on Carolina's home court. Duke turned up the defense late in regulation and went on a 10–0 run, taking a 72–69 lead on two free throws by Luol Deng with 1:06 left. Sean May scored on a rebound with 53 seconds to go, but JJ Redick restored the three-point lead on a drive with 38 seconds left. After a Carolina timeout, Jawad Williams hit a game-tying three-pointer with 18 seconds left; Daniel Ewing missed a potential game-winner for Duke with 3 seconds left. In overtime, Shelden Williams had two blocks and his defense forced Carolina into a 35-second shot clock violation with 22 seconds left. Redick then made two free throws to make it 81–78 and Rashad McCants drilled the game-tying three that set the stage for Duhon's heroics.

==== March 6, 2005: #2 North Carolina 75, #6 Duke 73 ====
At the Dean Smith Center, Chapel Hill
On Senior Day in Chapel Hill, before the largest crowd to see a college game on-campus in the state of North Carolina (22,125), the Tar Heels had a chance to win their first outright ACC regular-season title since 1993. However, they trailed Duke 73–64 with 3:07 left after Duke's Lee Melchionni made a 3. Offensive rebounds and subsequent put-backs by Carolina's Jawad Williams and Marvin Williams, the latter set up by a Duke turnover, cut the lead to five with two minutes to go. Duke's DeMarcus Nelson then missed the front end of a one-and-one. Sean May then rebounded a miss of his own, and was fouled on the put-back; he hit the free throw to make it 73–71 with 1:44 left. Misses by Melchionni and JJ Redick gave the ball back to the Tar Heels, but Duke's Shelden Williams came up with a huge block to regain possession for the Blue Devils with less than a minute to go. Duke inbounded the ball and looked to move it quickly up court, but Carolina's David Noel chased down Daniel Ewing from behind and knocked the ball away before he could get a pass off. Raymond Felton came up with the loose ball in a scrum and called for time, setting up a game-tying possession for the Tar Heels – an eerily similar scenario to the game a month earlier at Cameron Indoor Stadium. This time, he took the ball to the hoop and got fouled with 19.4 seconds left. Felton hit the first, but missed the second. However, he redeemed himself for his failure at Cameron, and managed to tip the board to Marvin Williams, who took it straight back up, was fouled with 17 seconds left and banked it in to give the Tar Heels the lead and set off a wild celebration in the Smith Center. The free throw made it 75–73; Duke called time to set up one final play. Duke's sharpshooter, Redick, got the ball, but his 3-pointer rimmed out with 6.7 seconds left. Ewing's desperation jumper with 4 seconds left was an airball; May grabbed the rebound to run out the clock and seal the 75–73 comeback win.

==== March 4, 2006: #13 North Carolina 83, #1 Duke 76 ====
At Cameron Indoor Stadium, Durham
Coming into the game ranked #1 in both polls, Duke hosted senior night, honoring the National Player of the Year and all-time ACC leading scorer JJ Redick and two-time National Defensive Player of the Year Shelden Williams. North Carolina, the defending national champions, had lost the whole core of the team that won it all the year before, but came into the game on a 7-game winning streak. Freshmen Tyler Hansbrough and Danny Green led Carolina as well as veterans Reyshawn Terry and David Noel. ESPN broadcast the game on all three of its channels as part of its first ESPN Full Circle coverage, showing a marathon of past games hours before tipoff. Duke led early 13–2 as Redick caught fire and hit his first five shots. The Tar Heels fought back, cutting the deficit to one by halftime. The Tar Heels stormed out to a 72–62 lead as Hansbrough and Terry started hitting their shots in the second half. After a timeout, Duke's Williams hit a hook shot that pulled Duke back within eight, but Hansbrough recovered a loose ball 25 feet from the hoop and answered with a three-pointer to beat the shot clock. DeMarcus Nelson then hit 3-pointers on 3 successive possessions to put the Devils back to within 3 with 1:31 left. However, that was as close as it would get. The Heels hit their free throws down the stretch, Redick missed 15 of his last 16 shots, and DeMarcus Nelson shot an air ball that resulted in a shot clock violation that prevented a late Duke rally, leading to a final score of 83–76. The game was watched by 3.78 million households on ESPN and ESPN2.

==== March 4, 2007: #8 North Carolina 86, #14 Duke 72 ====
At the Dean Smith Center, Chapel Hill
Carolina beat Duke at the Dean Smith Center 86–72, completing the season sweep of the Blue Devils. The most memorable part of this game was a combative foul by Gerald Henderson when his elbow contacted Tyler Hansbrough's nose on a hard foul attempt with 14.5 seconds on the clock and the result of the game already clearly determined. The contact broke Hansbrough's nose, drawing blood. The officials charged Henderson with a combative foul and ejected him from the game. After the foul, Hansbrough jumped up with blood streaming from his nose, but was calmed by his teammate Dewey Burke, before heading to the locker room for medical attention. Since then, both Hansbrough and Henderson have stated the foul was unintentional. To protect his broken nose, Hansbrough wore a face mask throughout the ACC tournament, and into the second round of the NCAA tournament.

==== February 8, 2012: #9 Duke 85, #5 North Carolina 84 ====
External videos
- "Austin Rivers Caps Comeback at UNC" by Duke Basketball on YouTube

At the Dean Smith Center, Chapel Hill
UNC held a lead of 10 points or more for most of the second half and were leading by 10 points until 2:09 when Duke's Tyler Thornton hit a 3-point shot quickly followed by another 3 by Seth Curry to close the margin to 4. With just 14 seconds left in the game, Tyler Zeller accidentally tipped the ball into the Duke basket on a Duke 3-point shot by Ryan Kelly. Duke was awarded 2 points on the tip in by Zeller leaving Carolina with a 1-point lead. Duke's Tyler Thornton fouled Zeller who made his first shot but missed his second leaving Carolina with a 2-point lead. Duke brought the ball up court following the defensive rebound off Zeller's missed free throw and Duke guard Austin Rivers – with his father, NBA player and coach Glenn "Doc" Rivers in attendance – hit the game-winning 3 over Zeller as time expired. Rivers finished the game with a career high 29 points, including six three-pointers.

Rameses, UNC's famed live mascot, died the next day. Ann Leonard, Rameses' owner, said the 8-year-old ram died peacefully, most likely of old age.

==== February 18, 2015: #4 Duke 92, #15 North Carolina 90 (OT) ====
External videos
- Video highlights on YouTube
- Full game broadcast on YouTube

At Cameron Indoor Stadium, Durham
Entering the game at Duke's Cameron Indoor Stadium with the passing of North Carolina's long-time coach Dean Smith a couple of days before, both Duke and UNC coaches, players and staff all gathered at center court and held a moment of silence for Smith. Once the game started Duke jumped right out of the gate with an 18–6 lead early in the game thanks to hot shooting. UNC would respond by outscoring Duke 30–22 over the next several minutes of the 1st half to cut Duke's lead down to 40–36 with around 4 minutes left in the 1st half. Duke then went on a 9–0 run over the next 2 minutes to get their largest lead of the game at 49–36 with 2 minutes left in the half. UNC would score the last 6 points of the half to cut Duke's lead down to 49–42 at halftime. In the 2nd half almost everything went UNC's way as UNC started dominating the post and eventually built their largest lead of the game, 77–67, over Duke with 4 minutes left in regulation to complete a 41–18 run over Duke in an 18-minute span. With Duke still trailing UNC 79–72 with around 2 1/2 minutes left in regulation, Duke's Tyus Jones would help Duke finish regulation on a 9–2 run over UNC to tie the game at 81 points apiece to send it to overtime. In overtime, the game was filled with missed free throws, missed shots, fouls, turnovers, lead changes and ties with Duke eventually winning the game 92–90.

==== March 4, 2017: #5 North Carolina 90, #17 Duke 83 ====
External videos
- Video highlights on YouTube

At the Dean Smith Center, Chapel Hill
On senior night in Chapel Hill, UNC had already locked up the number one seed in the ACC with Louisville's loss to Notre Dame, but Duke still had to win to clinch a double-bye in the ACC tournament. Joel Berry II, who came off the bench so seniors could start, and Luke Kennard led the way for their respective teams and would score 28 points each. Berry made each of his five attempted three-pointers in the first half to supplement Isaiah Hicks's success in the post for UNC, while Duke's Kennard, Grayson Allen, and Jayson Tatum enjoyed success from outside the arc, including a bank shot for Kennard and a four-point play for Allen. Neither team led by more than four points in the first half, which ended with a 48–46 lead for UNC. In the second half, UNC stayed in front or tied until Frank Jackson would give Duke the lead on a free throw with fifteen minutes left in regulation. In a game that ultimately featured 24 lead changes and 14 ties, Justin Jackson put UNC up 74–71 on a straightaway three-pointer after missing his first six attempts from outside the arc. After Jackson's shot, Duke would get as close as down by one but Berry scored seven straight points to keep UNC ahead. Allen uncharacteristically missed three consecutive free throws for Duke in the final minutes and UNC emerged victorious 90–83.

==== March 10, 2017: #14 Duke 93, #6 North Carolina 83 ====
External videos
- Video highlights on YouTube

At the Barclays Center, Brooklyn, New York (ACC tournament semifinals)
Six days after North Carolina avenged their earlier loss at Duke in February with a 90–83 victory at the Dean Dome, the two teams would face off in the semifinals of the ACC tournament, this time in Brooklyn. This game was only the fifth time that Duke and North Carolina had played each other outside of the state of North Carolina. North Carolina controlled the first half by outscoring Duke in the paint 32–10, with North Carolina's Kennedy Meeks leading the charge. North Carolina led by as many as 13 points and threatened to turn the game into a blowout, but Duke's Grayson Allen made four 3-pointers to get Duke within 7 points at the half, with North Carolina leading 49–42. In the second half, with North Carolina leading Duke 56–48 with 15:04 left, North Carolina's Joel Berry II picked up his fourth foul, which forced North Carolina to take him out of the game. Though North Carolina led by 13 points at 61–48 with 13:53 remaining, Duke used a 20–4 run over the next five minutes, thanks to steals and three-pointers from Duke's Jayson Tatum and Luke Kennard, to put Duke up 68–65 over North Carolina with 8:24 left. Duke then pulled away and won 93–83 to complete a 45–22 run over North Carolina in the final 14 minutes of the game.

==== February 20, 2019: #8 North Carolina 88, #1 Duke 72 ====
External videos
- Video highlights on YouTube

At Cameron Indoor Stadium, Durham
The first meeting between the rivals in the 2018–19 season at Duke was overshadowed by a freak injury to the Blue Devils' superstar freshman Zion Williamson during Duke's first possession of the game. While dribbling near the free throw line, Williamson tried to plant his left foot on the court. His shoe catastrophically failed, with the sole ripping loose from the midsole along its entire outside edge, causing Williamson's foot to go completely through the gap. He suffered what was later described as a mild sprain to his right knee in the incident, and never returned to the game. Following the incident, former United States president Barack Obama was shown on television mouthing the words "his shoe broke". The Tar Heels took full advantage, never trailing at any time and leading by as many as 22 points on their way to the win. Luke Maye starred for North Carolina with 30 points and 15 rebounds.

==== March 15, 2019: #5 Duke 74, #3 North Carolina 73 ====
External videos
- Video highlights on YouTube

At the Spectrum Center, Charlotte (ACC tournament semifinals)
After Duke's Zion Williamson only played the first 30 seconds of the 1st meeting and missed all of the 2nd meeting against North Carolina due to a mild knee sprain in his right knee he was finally able to play a full game against North Carolina in the semifinals of the ACC tournament. North Carolina blitzed Duke early thanks to hot shooting from Cam Johnson to put North Carolina up 33–20 over Duke with about 6 1/2 minutes left in the 1st half. Duke's Zion Williamson finally got going and scored 12 of Duke's last 24 points of the half to help Duke comeback and tie the score at 44 points a piece at halftime. The second half was neck and neck the entire way with both teams having their best players making big play after big play. Both teams became tired down the stretch and both teams suffered small scoring droughts at different parts late in the second half. In the end Duke was able to hold off North Carolina's last 2 shot attempts to escape with a 74–73 win over North Carolina snapping a 3-game losing streak to their biggest rival and advancing to the ACC tournament championship game. Zion Williamson was the hero for Duke after scoring 31 points in his second game back from injury.

==== February 8, 2020: #7 Duke 98, North Carolina 96 (OT) ====
External videos
- Video highlights from the end of the game on YouTube
- Full game broadcast on YouTube

At the Dean Smith Center, Chapel Hill
North Carolina entered this first rivalry game of 2020 with a 10–12 overall record (3–8 in conference play), their worst season record in 18 years. Ranked #7, Duke was a clear favorite to win this away match-up, having been in the top 10 all year. However, the Tar Heels outperformed expectations, in part due to 24 points and 11 rebounds by Cole Anthony, who had recently returned from a lengthy injury leave. North Carolina lead 44–35 at halftime and held a 13-point lead with 3:55 remaining in regulation time. However, they struggled with free throws, shooting 21-of-38 on the night, and Duke mounted a comeback, cutting the lead to five points with 0:20 remaining. Duke point guard Tre Jones scored 8 points in the final 50 seconds of regulation. Down 84–82 with 4.4 seconds remaining, Jones sent the game to overtime by intentionally ricocheting a free throw off the rim, rebounding, and sinking a 2-point buzzer-beater. In the extra period, North Carolina initially pulled ahead again, and held a 96–91 lead with 0:21 remaining. However, after a basket by Jones, the Blue Devils trailed by only one point in the final seconds. At the free throw line again, Jones made his first but missed the second. After scrambling for the rebound, Jones put up an off-target shot, which teammate Wendell Moore Jr. rebounded and put back at the buzzer to give Duke the 98–96 victory.

==== March 5, 2022: North Carolina 94, #4 Duke 81 ====
External videos
- Video highlights on YouTube
- Full game broadcast on YouTube

At Cameron Indoor Stadium, Durham
In Duke coach Mike Krzyzewski's final game in Cameron Indoor Stadium, unranked North Carolina traveled to Durham as heavy underdogs, having already lost to the fourth-ranked Blue Devils 87–67 in Chapel Hill on February 6. Led by first year head coach Hubert Davis, North Carolina was off to the races early, building an 11–4 lead early in the first half. However, thanks to hot shooting by Paolo Banchero, Duke would go on a 14–0 run later in the half, converting a 28–23 UNC lead to a 37–28 Duke lead in just over 3 minutes of game time. The Tar Heels made a push at the very end of the first half, capping it off with a buzzer-beating triple from R. J. Davis to cut the Blue Devil lead to two. Duke extended their lead to as many as seven in the second half, but a balanced team effort allowed North Carolina to claw back. With some late-game heroics from all five UNC starters, the Tar Heels dominated the Blue Devils 38–20 in the final 10:30 of regulation to pull off the stunning road upset in front of the Cameron Crazies and 96 of Coach K's former players.

==== April 2, 2022: (#8 East) North Carolina 81, #9 (#2 West) Duke 77 ====
External videos
- Video highlights on YouTube
- Full game broadcast by TBS on YouTube

At the Caesars Superdome, New Orleans, Louisiana (NCAA Tournament Final Four)
This was the first NCAA Tournament matchup in the rivalry's history. 2022 marked the second time both teams made the Final Four after Indianapolis in 1991, but unlike 1991, the two teams were matched against each other with the winner playing Kansas (victor against Villanova in the earlier national semifinal) in the national championship game. Ahead of the game, Governor Roy Cooper signed a proclamation proclaiming the state of North Carolina as the center of the college basketball universe.

During the tournament, Mike Krzyzewski passed UCLA's John Wooden for the most Final Four appearances by a single head coach, while North Carolina also set a record with their 21st Final Four appearance and beat two Final Four teams from the previous season in UCLA and reigning national champion Baylor.

In a thriller that included 18 lead changes, Carolina overcame a 3-point halftime deficit to win 81–77. It was Carolina's 7th win vs Duke in their previous 11 meetings. North Carolina was led by sophomore Caleb Love, whose 28-point performance included a 3-point dagger that stretched the North Carolina lead to 4 with only 24.8 seconds remaining and signaled the conclusion of both Duke's season and Krzyzewski's career. Having bested him for the second game in a row in his rookie season as head coach, Hubert Davis led North Carolina into the national championship against Kansas, where they would lose 72–69.

===== Route to the game =====
Duke Blue Devils (West #2)		Round	North Carolina Tar Heels (East #8)
Opponent	Result	Regionals	Opponent	Result
#15 Cal State Fullerton Titans	Win 78–61	First Round	#9 Marquette Golden Eagles	Win 95–63
#7 Michigan State Spartans	Win 85–76	Second Round	#1 Baylor Bears	Win 93–86 (OT)
#3 Texas Tech Red Raiders	Win 78–73	Regional Semifinals	#4 UCLA Bruins	Win 73–66
#4 Arkansas Razorbacks	Win 78–69	Regional Finals	#15 Saint Peter's Peacocks	Win 69–49

==== March 9, 2024: #7 North Carolina 84, #9 Duke 79 ====
At Cameron Indoor Stadium, Durham
In a significant rivalry game, UNC captured their first outright Atlantic Coast Conference (ACC) regular-season title in seven years, defeating Duke 84-79 in Cameron Indoor Stadium. This victory not only secured the top seed for UNC in the ACC Tournament but also completed a season sweep of the ninth-ranked Blue Devils, with UNC leading for nearly the entire duration of the two games. Cormac Ryan was a standout performer for the Tar Heels, scoring a career-high 31 points, shooting 8 of 12 from the field and 6 of 8 on 3-pointers, while Harrison Ingram added 14 points and 10 rebounds. UNC had a strong start, creating a 15-point lead and maintaining control throughout the game, while Duke struggled to get defensive stops and rebounds. Duke's attempt at a comeback fell short, despite Kyle Filipowski leading with 23 points, Jared McCain following with 19 points, and a brief moment of contention when Filipowski and Ingram tangled up, leading to a no-call trip that sparked controversy.

==== March 14, 2025: #1 Duke 74, North Carolina 71 ====
At the Spectrum Center, Charlotte (ACC tournament semifinals)
After sweeping its regular-season series with the Tar Heels, the Blue Devils earned their first 3-0 sweep over their rival since the 2001-02 season. Despite missing star freshman Cooper Flagg due to an ankle sprain, Duke got out to a 45-24 lead at halftime and led by 24 with 16:02 left. However, North Carolina would outscore Duke the rest of the way 43-22. Down 72-71 and with 4.1 seconds left, Tar Heel forward Ven-Allen Lubin earned a shooting foul. Lubin missed his first free throw and appeared to hit his second, but a lane violation by forward Jae'Lyn Withers negated the make. Duke forward Kon Knueppel made both of his free throws and the Blue Devils held off North Carolina's desperation 3-point attempt to win 74-71.

==== February 7, 2026: #14 North Carolina 71, #4 Duke 68 ====
At the Dean Smith Center, Chapel Hill
The No. 4 ranked Blue Devils faced off in an away game against the seasonal underdog No. 14 ranked Tar Heels at the Dean Dome. Duke quickly solidified a lead, which they maintained through the first half. UNC clung on, with Caleb Wilson firing on all cylinders. In the second half, Duke held the lead for the majority, with UNC vying but struggling to close the gap. However, with 10.6 seconds to go, UNC forced a tie on a Henri Veesaar three-pointer. With their final play, Seth Trimble hit a three point shot at the 0.4 second mark to earn North Carolina their first, only, and final lead, ultimately winning UNC the game and inciting not one but two court storms.

The game was the first since 1989 in which both teams had players projected to be selected within the top 5 draft picks, both superstar freshmen: projected No. 3 pick Cameron Boozer of Duke and projected No. 4 pick Caleb Wilson of UNC. The pair combined for 47 points, although Trimble's 16 point total and game-clinching three proved decisive.

=== Student engagement and tenting ===
In order to get standing room in the annual Duke-UNC game in Cameron Indoor Stadium, Duke students set up tents and sleep outside in a grassy area outside of the stadium known as Krzyzewskiville and named after former head coach Mike Krzyzewski. The process of lining up for tickets can last up to two months depending on the level of tenting the students choose to do and whether the game in Cameron Indoor is the first or second meeting of the teams during the season. The complex tenting rules are enforced by a set of students known as Line Monitors who regulate the tents and serve as leaders for the student section during the games.

Duke students who regularly camp in Krzyzewskiville are known for their methodical preparedness, bringing headlamps, portable chargers, shoe bins, and many layers of clothing to endure the North Carolina winters (games are typically played in February or March, when the average low in Durham is 29.5 and 37 degrees Fahrenheit, respectively). In the hours leading up to the game, students play music and put on dark blue and white paint (Duke's colors).

After the game, dependent on a win by the Duke Blue Devils, students rush out to their main residential quads (only a short distance from Cameron Indoor Stadium), and burn benches. Many residential communities at Duke traditionally build and paint benches for day-to-day use in the hopes of burning them in celebration of a win over Carolina. The students then rebuild benches shortly after in hopes of being able to burn them again the next year.

At Carolina, a win over Duke typically results in students rushing Franklin Street, the main thoroughfare just north of UNC's campus and the commercial heart of Chapel Hill. Police block off the street before the game in anticipation of thousands of students celebrating the win. Bonfires are also a feature of these celebrations, often using Duke gear as fuel.

=== Results ===
==== Scores of Games (1920–2026) ====
Complete List of Scores

Ranking of the team at the time of the game by the AP poll is shown in parentheses next to the team name (failure to list AP ranking does not necessarily mean the team was not ranked at the time of the game).

Duke victories	North Carolina victories	Tie games

No.	Date	Location	Duke		North Carolina		Notes
1	January 24, 1920	Angier Duke Gym	Duke	25	North Carolina	36	
2	March 1, 1920	Bynum Gym	Duke	19	North Carolina	18	
3	January 26, 1921	Angier Duke Gym	Duke	25	North Carolina	22	
4	February 23, 1921	Bynum Gym	Duke	12	North Carolina	44	
5	March 5, 1921	Raleigh, NC (Memorial Auditorium)	Duke	18	North Carolina	55	
6	February 4, 1922	Bynum Gym	Duke	22	North Carolina	38	
7	March 7, 1922	Angier Duke Gym	Duke	23	North Carolina	29	
8	February 3, 1923	Angier Duke Gym	Duke	19	North Carolina	20	
9	February 17, 1923	Bynum Gym	Duke	22	North Carolina	36	
10	January 31, 1924	Tin Can	Duke	20	North Carolina	31	
11	February 19, 1924	Angier Duke Gym	Duke	20	North Carolina	23	
12	January 24, 1925	Alumni Memorial Gym	Duke	21	North Carolina	25	
13	February 14, 1925	Tin Can	Duke	18	North Carolina	34	
14	January 23, 1926	Tin Can	Duke	22	North Carolina	38	
15	February 20, 1926	Alumni Memorial Gym	Duke	21	North Carolina	44	
16	January 31, 1927	Alumni Memorial Gym	Duke	33	North Carolina	40	
17	February 22, 1927	Tin Can	Duke	21	North Carolina	37	
18	February 4, 1928	Tin Can	Duke	14	North Carolina	27	
19	February 11, 1928	Alumni Memorial Gym	Duke	23	North Carolina	32	
20	February 2, 1929	Alumni Memorial Gym	Duke	36	North Carolina	20	
21	February 16, 1929	Tin Can	Duke	24	North Carolina	27	
22	March 2, 1929	Atlanta, GA (Southern Conference Tournament)	Duke	34	North Carolina	17	
23	February 1, 1930	Tin Can	Duke	36	North Carolina	14	
24	February 15, 1930	Card Gym	Duke	37	North Carolina	36	
25	January 31, 1931	Card Gym	Duke	30	North Carolina	18	
26	February 14, 1931	Tin Can	Duke	34	North Carolina	23	
27	January 30, 1932	Tin Can	Duke	20	North Carolina	37	
28	February 13, 1932	Card Gym	Duke	24	North Carolina	18	
29	January 31, 1933	Card Gym	Duke	36	North Carolina	32	
30	February 11, 1933	Tin Can	Duke	31	North Carolina	24	
31	February 3, 1934	Tin Can	Duke	21	North Carolina	25	
32	February 16, 1934	Card Gym	Duke	25	North Carolina	30	
33	March 2, 1934	Raleigh, NC (Southern Conference Tournament)	Duke	22	North Carolina	18	
34	February 5, 1935	Card Gym	Duke	33	North Carolina	27	
35	February 16, 1935	Tin Can	Duke	20	North Carolina	24	
36	February 6, 1936	Tin Can	Duke	36	North Carolina	34	Overtime
37	February 21, 1936	Card Gym	Duke	28	North Carolina	30	
38	February 12, 1937	Card Gym	Duke	35	North Carolina	41	
39	February 25, 1937	Tin Can	Duke	32	North Carolina	37	
40	March 4, 1937	Raleigh, NC (Southern Conference Tournament)	Duke	30	North Carolina	34	
41	February 12, 1938	Tin Can	Duke	24	North Carolina	34	
42	February 25, 1938	Card Gym	Duke	39	North Carolina	33	
43	February 10, 1939	Woollen Gym	Duke	32	North Carolina	37	
44	February 24, 1939	Card Gym	Duke	41	North Carolina	38	
45	February 10, 1940	Woollen Gym	Duke	50	North Carolina	44	
46	February 22, 1940	Duke Indoor Stadium	Duke	27	North Carolina	31	
47	March 2, 1940	Raleigh, NC (Southern Conference Tournament)	Duke	23	North Carolina	39	
48	February 7, 1941	Woollen Gym	Duke	33	North Carolina	51	
49	February 20, 1941	Duke Indoor Stadium	Duke	35	North Carolina	33	
50	February 27, 1941	Raleigh, NC (Southern Conference Tournament)	Duke	38	North Carolina	37	
51	February 7, 1942	Woollen Gym	Duke	52	North Carolina	40	
52	February 27, 1942	Duke Indoor Stadium	Duke	41	North Carolina	40	Overtime
53	February 6, 1943	Woollen Gym	Duke	51	North Carolina	39	
54	February 26, 1943	Duke Indoor Stadium	Duke	43	North Carolina	24	
55	January 18, 1944	Duke Indoor Stadium	Duke	33	North Carolina	37	
56	February 5, 1944	Woollen Gym	Duke	41	North Carolina	40	
57	February 10, 1944	Duke Indoor Stadium	Duke	30	North Carolina	39	
58	February 26, 1944	Raleigh, NC (Southern Conference Tournament)	Duke	44	North Carolina	27	
59	January 20, 1945	Woollen Gym	Duke	50	North Carolina	41	
60	February 14, 1945	Duke Indoor Stadium	Duke	38	North Carolina	50	
61	February 24, 1945	Raleigh, NC (Southern Conference Tournament)	Duke	38	North Carolina	49	
62	January 9, 1946	Woollen Gym	Duke	51	North Carolina	46	Overtime
63	February 16, 1946	Duke Indoor Stadium	Duke	44	North Carolina	54	
64	February 11, 1947	Woollen Gym	Duke	28	North Carolina	49	
65	February 28, 1947	Duke Indoor Stadium	Duke	47	North Carolina	57	
66	February 7, 1948	Woollen Gym	Duke	42	North Carolina	48	
67	February 27, 1948	Duke Indoor Stadium	Duke	56	North Carolina	45	
68	February 5, 1949	Woollen Gym	Duke	34	North Carolina	64	
69	February 25, 1949	Duke Indoor Stadium	Duke	40	North Carolina	64	
70	December 27, 1949	Raleigh, NC (Dixie Classic)	Duke	52	North Carolina	59	
71	February 17, 1950	Woollen Gym	Duke	55	North Carolina	58	
72	February 24, 1950	Duke Indoor Stadium	Duke	46	North Carolina	63	
73	December 29, 1950	Raleigh, NC (Dixie Classic)	Duke	71	North Carolina	63	
74	February 2, 1951	Woollen Gym	Duke	68	North Carolina	71	
75	February 23, 1951	Duke Indoor Stadium	Duke	84	North Carolina	72	
76	December 5, 1951	Duke Indoor Stadium	Duke (12)	77	North Carolina (NR)	59	
77	February 1, 1952	Woollen Gym	Duke	73	North Carolina	66	
78	February 29, 1952	Duke Indoor Stadium	Duke (15)	94	North Carolina (NR)	64	
79	February 6, 1953	Woollen Gym	Duke	95	North Carolina	89	
80	February 27, 1953	Duke Indoor Stadium	Duke	83	North Carolina	58	
81	February 4, 1954	Duke Indoor Stadium	Duke (8)	63	North Carolina (NR)	47	
82	February 20, 1954	Woollen Gym	Duke (14)	67	North Carolina (NR)	63	
83	December 29, 1954	Raleigh, NC (Dixie Classic)	Duke (18)	52	North Carolina (NR)	65	
84	February 4, 1955	Woollen Gym	Duke	91	North Carolina	68	
85	February 25, 1955	Duke Indoor Stadium	Duke	96	North Carolina	74	
86	December 30, 1955	Raleigh, NC (Dixie Classic)	Duke (8)	64	North Carolina (4)	74	
87	February 4, 1956	Duke Indoor Stadium	Duke (10)	64	North Carolina (9)	59	
88	February 24, 1956	Woollen Gym	Duke (11)	65	North Carolina (9)	73	
89	December 28, 1956	Raleigh, NC (Dixie Classic)	Duke (9)	71	North Carolina (2)	87	
90	February 9, 1957	Woollen Gym	Duke (NR)	73	North Carolina (1)	75	
91	March 1, 1957	Duke Indoor Stadium	Duke (NR)	72	North Carolina (1)	86	
92	December 27, 1957	Raleigh, NC (Dixie Classic)	Duke (NR)	62	North Carolina (4)	76	
93	February 8, 1958	Woollen Gym	Duke (13)	91	North Carolina (7)	75	
94	February 28, 1958	Duke Indoor Stadium	Duke (6)	59	North Carolina (9)	46	
95	February 6, 1959	Duke Indoor Stadium	Duke (NR)	80	North Carolina (2)	89	
96	February 28, 1959	Woollen Gym	Duke (NR)	62	North Carolina (3)	72	
97	March 6, 1959	Raleigh, NC (ACC tournament)	Duke (NR)	71	North Carolina (5)	74	
98	December 29, 1959	Raleigh, NC (Dixie Classic)	Duke (18)	53	North Carolina (NR)	75	
99	February 13, 1960	Woollen Gym	Duke (NR)	57	North Carolina (13)	84	
100	February 27, 1960	Duke Indoor Stadium	Duke	50	North Carolina	75	
101	March 4, 1960	Raleigh, NC (ACC tournament)	Duke (NR)	71	North Carolina (16)	69	
102	December 31, 1960	Raleigh, NC (Dixie Classic)	Duke (6)	71	North Carolina (11)	76	
103	February 4, 1961	Duke Indoor Stadium	Duke (4)	81	North Carolina (5)	77	
104	February 25, 1961	Woollen Gym	Duke (6)	66	North Carolina (7)	69	Overtime
105	February 3, 1962	Duke Indoor Stadium	Duke (6)	79	North Carolina (NR)	57	
106	February 24, 1962	Woollen Gym	Duke (8)	82	North Carolina (NR)	74	
107	February 2, 1963	Woollen Gym	Duke (3)	77	North Carolina (NR)	69	
108	February 23, 1963	Duke Indoor Stadium	Duke (2)	106	North Carolina (NR)	93	
109	January 11, 1964	Duke Indoor Stadium	Duke (9)	84	North Carolina (NR)	64	
110	February 29, 1964	Woollen Gym	Duke (4)	104	North Carolina (NR)	69	
111	March 6, 1964	Raleigh, NC (ACC tournament)	Duke (4)	65	North Carolina (NR)	49	
112	January 9, 1965	Duke Indoor Stadium	Duke (8)	62	North Carolina (NR)	65	
113	February 27, 1965	Woollen Gym	Duke (5)	66	North Carolina (NR)	71	
114	January 8, 1966	Carmichael Auditorium	Duke (1)	88	North Carolina (NR)	77	
115	February 26, 1966	Duke Indoor Stadium	Duke (2)	77	North Carolina (NR)	63	
116	March 4, 1966	Raleigh, NC (ACC tournament)	Duke (2)	21	North Carolina (NR)	20	
117	January 7, 1967	Duke Indoor Stadium	Duke (NR)	56	North Carolina (3)	59	
118	March 4, 1967	Carmichael Auditorium	Duke (NR)	79	North Carolina (3)	92	
119	March 11, 1967	Greensboro, NC (ACC tournament)	Duke (NR)	73	North Carolina (4)	82	
120	January 6, 1968	Carmichael Auditorium	Duke (NR)	72	North Carolina (3)	75	
121	March 2, 1968	Duke Indoor Stadium	Duke (10)	87	North Carolina (3)	86	Triple overtime
122	January 4, 1969	Carmichael Auditorium	Duke (NR)	70	North Carolina (4)	94	
123	March 1, 1969	Duke Indoor Stadium	Duke (NR)	87	North Carolina (2)	81	
124	March 8, 1969	Charlotte, NC (ACC tournament)	Duke (NR)	74	North Carolina (4)	85	
125	January 10, 1970	Carmichael Auditorium	Duke (19)	78	North Carolina (4)	86	
126	February 28, 1970	Duke Indoor Stadium	Duke (NR)	91	North Carolina (19)	83	
127	December 19, 1970	Greensboro, NC (Big Four Tournament)	Duke (NR)	81	North Carolina (20)	83	
128	January 9, 1971	Carmichael Auditorium	Duke (NR)	74	North Carolina (20)	79	
129	March 6, 1971	Duke Indoor Stadium	Duke (NR)	92	North Carolina (12)	83	
130	March 25, 1971	Madison Square Garden (NIT)	Duke (NR)	67	North Carolina (13)	73	
131	January 22, 1972	Cameron Indoor Stadium	Duke (NR)	76	North Carolina (3)	74	
132	March 4, 1972	Carmichael Auditorium	Duke (NR)	69	North Carolina (3)	93	
133	March 10, 1972	Greensboro, NC (ACC tournament)	Duke (NR)	48	North Carolina (3)	63	
134	December 15, 1972	Greensboro, NC (Big Four Tournament)	Duke (NR)	86	North Carolina (11)	91	
135	January 20, 1973	Carmichael Auditorium	Duke (NR)	71	North Carolina (4)	82	
136	March 3, 1973	Cameron Indoor Stadium	Duke (NR)	70	North Carolina (7)	72	
137	January 5, 1974	Greensboro, NC (Big Four Tournament)	Duke (NR)	75	North Carolina (4)	84	
138	January 19, 1974	Cameron Indoor Stadium	Duke (NR)	71	North Carolina (5)	73	
139	March 2, 1974	Carmichael Auditorium	Duke (NR)	92	North Carolina (4)	96	Overtime
140	January 3, 1975	Greensboro, NC (Big Four Tournament)	Duke (NR)	99	North Carolina (8)	96	Overtime
141	February 12, 1975	Carmichael Auditorium	Duke (NR)	70	North Carolina (11)	78	
142	March 1, 1975	Cameron Indoor Stadium	Duke (NR)	70	North Carolina (14)	74	
143	January 3, 1976	Greensboro, NC (Big Four Tournament)	Duke (NR)	74	North Carolina (3)	77	
144	January 17, 1976	Cameron Indoor Stadium	Duke (NR)	87	North Carolina (7)	89	
145	February 28, 1976	Carmichael Auditorium	Duke (NR)	71	North Carolina (4)	91	
146	January 15, 1977	Carmichael Auditorium	Duke (NR)	68	North Carolina (5)	77	
147	February 26, 1977	Cameron Indoor Stadium	Duke (NR)	71	North Carolina (9)	84	
148	December 2, 1977	Greensboro, NC (Big Four Tournament)	Duke (NR)	66	North Carolina (2)	79	
149	January 14, 1978	Cameron Indoor Stadium	Duke (NR)	92	North Carolina (2)	84	
150	February 25, 1978	Carmichael Auditorium	Duke (13)	83	North Carolina (8)	87	
151	December 2, 1978	Greensboro, NC (Big Four Tournament)	Duke (1)	78	North Carolina (14)	68	
152	January 13, 1979	Carmichael Auditorium	Duke (7)	68	North Carolina (3)	74	
153	February 24, 1979	Cameron Indoor Stadium	Duke (6)	47	North Carolina (4)	40	
154	March 3, 1979	Greensboro, NC (ACC tournament)	Duke (5)	63	North Carolina (7)	71	
155	December 1, 1979	Greensboro, NC (Big Four Tournament)	Duke (3)	86	North Carolina (6)	74	
156	January 12, 1980	Cameron Indoor Stadium	Duke (1)	67	North Carolina (15)	82	
157	February 23, 1980	Carmichael Auditorium	Duke (17)	71	North Carolina (8)	96	
158	February 29, 1980	Greensboro, NC (ACC tournament)	Duke (NR)	75	North Carolina (10)	61	
159	December 5, 1980	Greensboro, NC (Big Four Tournament)	Duke (NR)	76	North Carolina (10)	78	
160	January 17, 1981	Carmichael Auditorium	Duke (NR)	65	North Carolina (17)	80	
161	February 28, 1981	Cameron Indoor Stadium	Duke (NR)	66	North Carolina (11)	65	Overtime
162	January 16, 1982	Cameron Indoor Stadium	Duke (NR)	63	North Carolina (1)	73	
163	February 27, 1982	Carmichael Auditorium	Duke (NR)	66	North Carolina (2)	84	
164	January 22, 1983	Carmichael Auditorium	Duke (NR)	82	North Carolina (3)	103	
165	March 5, 1983	Cameron Indoor Stadium	Duke (NR)	81	North Carolina (8)	105	
166	January 21, 1984	Cameron Indoor Stadium	Duke (NR)	73	North Carolina (1)	78	
167	March 3, 1984	Carmichael Auditorium	Duke (15)	83	North Carolina (1)	96	Double overtime
168	March 10, 1984	Greensboro, NC (ACC tournament)	Duke (16)	77	North Carolina (1)	75	
169	January 19, 1985	Carmichael Auditorium	Duke (2)	93	North Carolina (6)	77	
170	March 2, 1985	Cameron Indoor Stadium	Duke (5)	68	North Carolina (8)	78	
171	January 18, 1986	Dean Smith Center	Duke (3)	92	North Carolina (1)	95	
172	March 2, 1986	Cameron Indoor Stadium	Duke (1)	82	North Carolina (3)	74	
173	January 10, 1987	Cameron Indoor Stadium	Duke (17)	77	North Carolina (3)	85	
174	February 26, 1987	Dean Smith Center	Duke (17)	71	North Carolina (2)	77	
175	January 21, 1988	Dean Smith Center	Duke (9)	70	North Carolina (2)	69	
176	March 6, 1988	Cameron Indoor Stadium	Duke (9)	96	North Carolina (6)	81	
177	March 13, 1988	Greensboro, NC (ACC tournament)	Duke (8)	65	North Carolina (9)	61	
178	January 18, 1989	Cameron Indoor Stadium	Duke (1)	71	North Carolina (13)	91	
179	March 5, 1989	Dean Smith Center	Duke (9)	88	North Carolina (5)	86	
180	March 12, 1989	Atlanta, GA (ACC tournament)	Duke (7)	74	North Carolina (9)	77	
181	January 17, 1990	Dean Smith Center	Duke (8)	60	North Carolina (NR)	79	
182	March 4, 1990	Cameron Indoor Stadium	Duke (5)	75	North Carolina (NR)	87	
183	January 19, 1991	Cameron Indoor Stadium	Duke (12)	74	North Carolina (5)	60	
184	March 3, 1991	Dean Smith Center	Duke (8)	83	North Carolina (4)	77	
185	March 10, 1991	Charlotte, NC (ACC tournament)	Duke (6)	74	North Carolina (7)	96	
186	February 5, 1992	Dean Smith Center	Duke (1)	73	North Carolina (9)	75	
187	March 8, 1992	Cameron Indoor Stadium	Duke (1)	89	North Carolina (16)	77	
188	March 15, 1992	Charlotte, NC (ACC tournament)	Duke (1)	94	North Carolina (20)	74	
189	February 3, 1993	Cameron Indoor Stadium	Duke (5)	81	North Carolina (6)	67	
190	March 7, 1993	Dean Smith Center	Duke (6)	69	North Carolina (1)	83	
191	February 3, 1994	Dean Smith Center	Duke (1)	78	North Carolina (2)	89	
192	March 5, 1994	Cameron Indoor Stadium	Duke (2)	77	North Carolina (5)	87	
193	February 2, 1995	Cameron Indoor Stadium	Duke (NR)	100	North Carolina (2)	102	Double overtime
194	March 4, 1995	Dean Smith Center	Duke (NR)	86	North Carolina (2)	99	
195	January 31, 1996	Dean Smith Center	Duke (NR)	72	North Carolina (8)	73	
196	March 3, 1996	Cameron Indoor Stadium	Duke (NR)	78	North Carolina (19)	84	
197	January 29, 1997	Cameron Indoor Stadium	Duke (12)	80	North Carolina (19)	73	
198	March 2, 1997	Dean Smith Center	Duke (7)	85	North Carolina (8)	91	
199	February 5, 1998	Dean Smith Center	Duke (1)	73	North Carolina (2)	97	
200	February 28, 1998	Cameron Indoor Stadium	Duke (1)	77	North Carolina (4)	75	
201	March 8, 1998	Greensboro, NC (ACC tournament)	Duke (1)	68	North Carolina (4)	83	
202	January 27, 1999	Cameron Indoor Stadium	Duke (1)	89	North Carolina (10)	77	Recap
203	February 27, 1999	Dean Smith Center	Duke (1)	81	North Carolina (14)	61	Recap
204	March 7, 1999	Charlotte, NC (ACC tournament)	Duke (1)	96	North Carolina (15)	73	Recap
205	February 3, 2000	Dean Smith Center	Duke (3)	90	North Carolina (NR)	86	Overtime; Article
206	March 4, 2000	Cameron Indoor Stadium	Duke (4)	90	North Carolina (NR)	76	Recap
207	February 1, 2001	Cameron Indoor Stadium	Duke (2)	83	North Carolina (4)	85	Recap
208	March 4, 2001	Dean Smith Center	Duke (2)	95	North Carolina (4)	81	Recap
209	March 11, 2001	Atlanta, GA (ACC tournament)	Duke (3)	79	North Carolina (6)	53	Recap
210	January 31, 2002	Dean Smith Center	Duke (1)	87	North Carolina (NR)	58	Recap
211	March 3, 2002	Cameron Indoor Stadium	Duke (3)	93	North Carolina (NR)	68	Recap
212	March 8, 2002	Charlotte, NC (ACC tournament)	Duke (3)	60	North Carolina (NR)	48	Recap
213	February 5, 2003	Cameron Indoor Stadium	Duke (9)	83	North Carolina (NR)	74	Recap
214	March 9, 2003	Dean Smith Center	Duke (10)	79	North Carolina (NR)	82	Recap
215	March 15, 2003	Greensboro, NC (ACC tournament)	Duke (12)	75	North Carolina (NR)	63	Recap
216	February 5, 2004	Dean Smith Center	Duke (1)	83	North Carolina (17)	81	Overtime; Article
217	March 6, 2004	Cameron Indoor Stadium	Duke (3)	70	North Carolina (14)	65	Recap
218	February 9, 2005	Cameron Indoor Stadium	Duke (7)	71	North Carolina (2)	70	Recap
219	March 6, 2005	Dean Smith Center	Duke (6)	73	North Carolina (2)	75	Recap
220	February 7, 2006	Dean Smith Center	Duke (2)	87	North Carolina (23)	83	Recap
221	March 4, 2006	Cameron Indoor Stadium	Duke (1)	76	North Carolina (13)	83	Recap
222	February 7, 2007	Cameron Indoor Stadium	Duke (16)	73	North Carolina (5)	79	Recap
223	March 4, 2007	Dean Smith Center	Duke (14)	72	North Carolina (8)	86	Recap
224	February 6, 2008	Dean Smith Center	Duke (2)	89	North Carolina (3)	78	Recap
225	March 8, 2008	Cameron Indoor Stadium	Duke (5)	68	North Carolina (1)	76	Recap
226	February 11, 2009	Cameron Indoor Stadium	Duke (5)	87	North Carolina (3)	101	Recap
227	March 8, 2009	Dean Smith Center	Duke (7)	71	North Carolina (2)	79	Recap
228	February 10, 2010	Dean Smith Center	Duke (8)	64	North Carolina (NR)	54	Recap
229	March 6, 2010	Cameron Indoor Stadium	Duke (4)	82	North Carolina (NR)	50	Recap
230	February 9, 2011	Cameron Indoor Stadium	Duke (5)	79	North Carolina (20)	73	Recap
231	March 5, 2011	Dean Smith Center	Duke (4)	67	North Carolina (13)	81	Recap
232	March 13, 2011	Greensboro, NC (ACC tournament)	Duke (5)	75	North Carolina (6)	58	Recap
233	February 8, 2012	Dean Smith Center	Duke (9)	85	North Carolina (5)	84	Recap
234	March 3, 2012	Cameron Indoor Stadium	Duke (3)	70	North Carolina (6)	88	Recap
235	February 13, 2013	Cameron Indoor Stadium	Duke (2)	73	North Carolina (NR)	68	Recap
236	March 9, 2013	Dean Smith Center	Duke (3)	69	North Carolina (NR)	53	Recap
237	February 20, 2014	Dean Smith Center	Duke (5)	66	North Carolina (NR)	74	Recap
238	March 8, 2014	Cameron Indoor Stadium	Duke (4)	93	North Carolina (14)	81	Recap
239	February 18, 2015	Cameron Indoor Stadium	Duke (4)	92	North Carolina (15)	90	Overtime; Recap
240	March 7, 2015	Dean Smith Center	Duke (3)	84	North Carolina (19)	77	Recap
241	February 17, 2016	Dean Smith Center	Duke (20)	74	North Carolina (5)	73	Recap
242	March 5, 2016	Cameron Indoor Stadium	Duke (17)	72	North Carolina (8)	76	Recap
243	February 9, 2017	Cameron Indoor Stadium	Duke (18)	86	North Carolina (8)	78	Recap
244	March 4, 2017	Dean Smith Center	Duke (17)	83	North Carolina (5)	90	Recap
245	March 10, 2017	Brooklyn, NY (ACC tournament)	Duke (14)	93	North Carolina (6)	83	Recap
246	February 8, 2018	Dean Smith Center	Duke (9)	78	North Carolina (21)	82	Recap
247	March 3, 2018	Cameron Indoor Stadium	Duke (5)	74	North Carolina (9)	64	Recap
248	March 9, 2018	Brooklyn, NY (ACC tournament)	Duke (5)	69	North Carolina (12)	74	Recap
249	February 20, 2019	Cameron Indoor Stadium	Duke (1)	72	North Carolina (8)	88	Recap
250	March 9, 2019	Dean Smith Center	Duke (4)	70	North Carolina (3)	79	Recap
251	March 15, 2019	Charlotte, NC (ACC tournament)	Duke (5)	74	North Carolina (3)	73	Recap
252	February 8, 2020	Dean Smith Center	Duke (7)	98	North Carolina (NR)	96	Overtime; Recap
253	March 7, 2020	Cameron Indoor Stadium	Duke (12)	89	North Carolina (NR)	76	Recap
254	February 6, 2021	Cameron Indoor Stadium	Duke (NR)	87	North Carolina (NR)	91	Recap
255	March 6, 2021	Dean Smith Center	Duke (NR)	73	North Carolina (NR)	91	Recap
256	February 5, 2022	Dean Smith Center	Duke (9)	87	North Carolina (NR)	67	Recap
257	March 5, 2022	Cameron Indoor Stadium	Duke (4)	81	North Carolina (NR)	94	Recap
258	April 2, 2022	New Orleans, LA (NCAA Final Four)	Duke (W2)	77	North Carolina (E8)	81	Recap
259	February 4, 2023	Cameron Indoor Stadium	Duke (NR)	63	North Carolina (NR)	57	Recap
260	March 4, 2023	Dean Smith Center	Duke (NR)	62	North Carolina (NR)	57	Recap
261	February 3, 2024	Dean Smith Center	Duke (7)	84	North Carolina (3)	93	Recap
262	March 9, 2024	Cameron Indoor Stadium	Duke (9)	79	North Carolina (7)	84	
263	February 1, 2025	Cameron Indoor Stadium	Duke (2)	87	North Carolina (NR)	70	
264	March 8, 2025	Dean Smith Center	Duke (2)	82	North Carolina (NR)	69	
265	March 14, 2025	Charlotte, NC (ACC tournament)	Duke (1)	74	North Carolina (NR)	71	
266	February 7, 2026	Dean Smith Center	Duke (4)	68	North Carolina (14)	71	
267	March 7, 2026	Cameron Indoor Stadium	Duke (1)	76	North Carolina (17)	61	
Series: North Carolina leads 146–121

==== Achievements by Season (1975–2026) ====
Achievements by Season

Season	ACC regular season Champions	ACC tournament Champions	Duke's performance in in the NCAA tournament	North Carolina's performance in the NCAA tournament
1974–1975	Maryland	North Carolina	Did not qualify	Sweet Sixteen
1975–1976	North Carolina	Virginia	Did not qualify	Round of 32
1976–1977	North Carolina	North Carolina	Did not qualify	Runner-up
1977–1978	North Carolina	Duke	Runner-up	Round of 32
1978–1979	Duke/North Carolina (co-champs)	North Carolina	Round of 32	Round of 32
1979–1980	Maryland	Duke	Elite Eight	Round of 32
1980–1981	Virginia	North Carolina	Did not qualify	Runner-up
1981–1982	North Carolina	North Carolina	Did not qualify	National Champions
1982–1983	North Carolina	NC State	Did not qualify	Elite Eight
1983–1984	North Carolina	Maryland	Round of 32	Sweet Sixteen
1984–1985	North Carolina (co-champs)	Georgia Tech	Round of 32	Elite Eight
1985–1986	Duke	Duke	Runner-up	Sweet Sixteen
1986–1987	North Carolina	N. C. State	Sweet Sixteen	Elite Eight
1987–1988	North Carolina	Duke	Final Four	Elite Eight
1988–1989	N.C. State	North Carolina	Final Four	Sweet Sixteen
1989–1990	Clemson	Georgia Tech	Runner-up	Sweet Sixteen
1990–1991	Duke	North Carolina	National champions	Final Four
1991–1992	Duke	Duke	National champions	Sweet Sixteen
1992–1993	North Carolina	Georgia Tech	Round of 32	National Champions
1993–1994	Duke	North Carolina	Runner-up	Round of 32
1994–1995	North Carolina (co-champs)	Wake Forest	Did not qualify	Final Four
1995–1996	Georgia Tech	Wake Forest	Round of 64	Round of 32
1996–1997	Duke	North Carolina	Round of 32	Final Four
1997–1998	Duke	North Carolina	Elite Eight	Final Four
1998–1999	Duke	Duke	Runner-up	Round of 64
1999–2000	Duke	Duke	Sweet Sixteen	Final Four
2000–2001	Duke/North Carolina (co-champs)	Duke	National champions	Round of 32
2001–2002	Maryland	Duke	Sweet Sixteen	Did not qualify
2002–2003	Wake Forest	Duke	Sweet Sixteen	Did not qualify
2003–2004*	Duke	Maryland	Final Four	Round of 32
2004–2005	North Carolina	Duke	Sweet Sixteen	National Champions
2005–2006	Duke	Duke	Sweet Sixteen	Round of 32
2006–2007	North Carolina (co-champs)	North Carolina	Round of 64	Elite Eight
2007–2008	North Carolina	North Carolina	Round of 32	Final Four
2008–2009	North Carolina	Duke	Sweet Sixteen	National Champions
2009–2010	Duke (co-champs)	Duke	National champions	Did not qualify
2010–2011	North Carolina	Duke	Sweet Sixteen	Elite Eight
2011–2012	North Carolina	Florida State	Round of 64	Elite Eight
2012–2013	Miami	Miami	Elite Eight	Round of 32
2013–2014	Virginia	Virginia	Round of 64	Round of 32
2014–2015	Virginia	Notre Dame	National champions	Sweet Sixteen
2015–2016	North Carolina	North Carolina	Sweet Sixteen	Runner-up
2016–2017	North Carolina	Duke	Round of 32	National Champions
2017–2018	Virginia	Virginia	Elite Eight	Round of 32
2018–2019	North Carolina (co-champs)	Duke	Elite Eight	Sweet Sixteen
2019–2020†	Florida State	Tournament Incomplete	Tournament Canceled	
2020–2021	Virginia	Georgia Tech	Did not qualify	Round of 64
2021–2022	Duke	Virginia Tech	Final Four	Runner-up
2022–2023	Miami/Virginia (co-champs)	Duke	Round of 32	Did not qualify
2023–2024	North Carolina	NC State	Elite Eight	Sweet Sixteen
2024–2025	Duke	Duke	Final Four	Round of 64
2025–2026	Duke	Duke	Elite Eight	Round of 64

* This was the last year of a balanced regular season schedule (each team played a home-and-away series with every other conference foe). In subsequent years, this was not possible due to conference expansion.

† The NCAA tournament was canceled in response to the COVID-19 global pandemic of 2020. The ACC tournament was canceled after the second round after North Carolina was eliminated and Duke had yet to play a game.

== Football ==
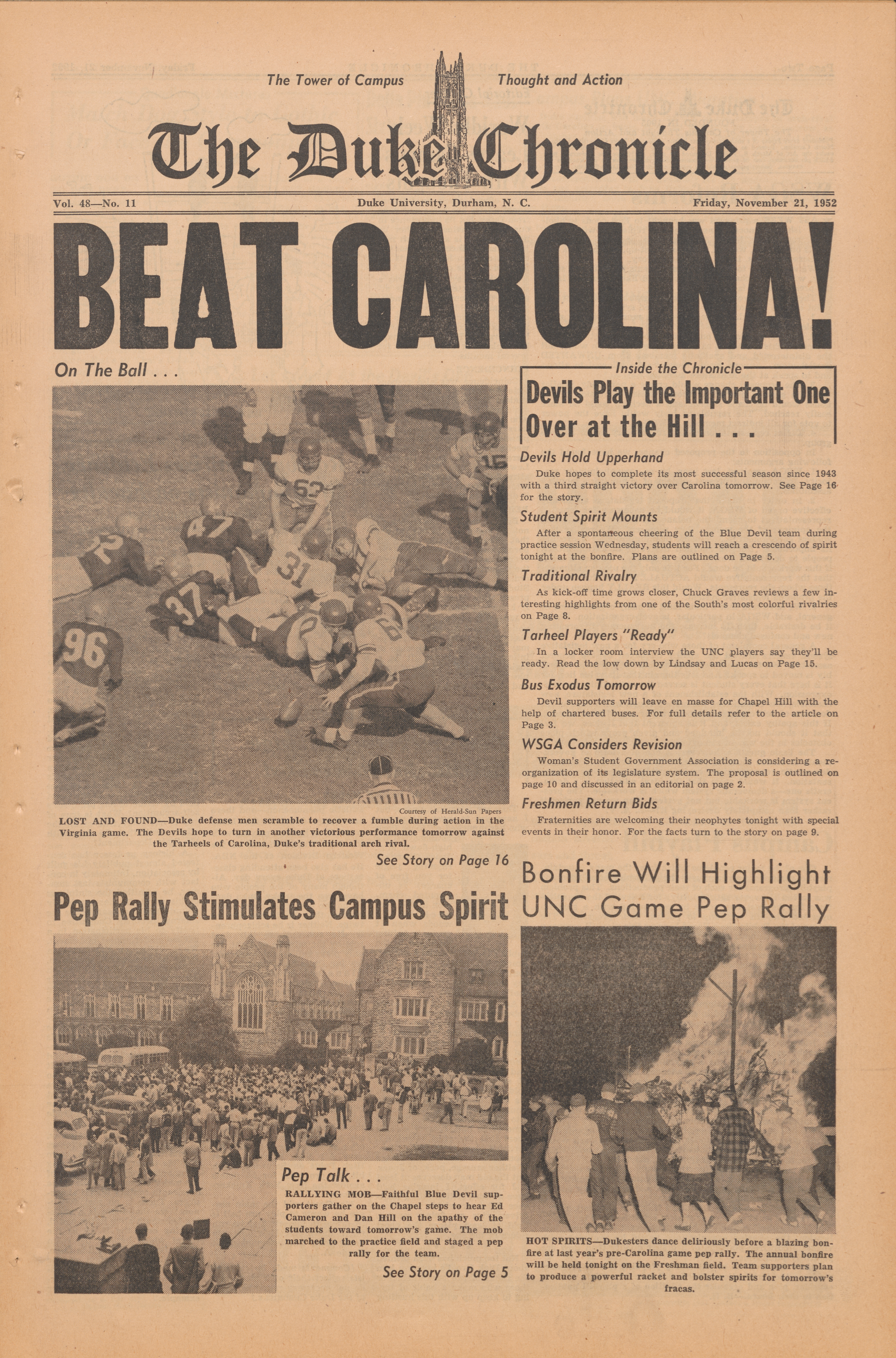
A headline in Duke's student newspaper ahead of the 1952 football game

The football rivalry is also intense, although not as intense as the basketball rivalry. While both schools agree that Carolina holds a large lead in the series, the two schools disagree on an 1889 game in which both teams thought they were supposed to be the home team. Carolina claims a 58–36–4 lead; Duke claims UNC leads 57–37–4. On 10/20/12, Duke beat UNC in football for the first time since 2003. On 11/30/13, Duke beat UNC in football for the second straight year, 27–25, winning back to back games in the series for the first time since 1989. That year, Duke won its seventh ACC Championship, while UNC has won five times. The 2013 win also gave Duke the outright Coastal Division championship and sent Duke to the ACC Championship Game for the first time since its 2005 inception and became the first Coastal Division representative other than Virginia Tech or Georgia Tech. Duke is the last university in the North Carolina Triangle region to win an ACC football championship. The two game win streak by Duke was snapped in 2014 on a nationally televised Thursday game when the Tar Heels beat Duke 45–20 at Wallace Wade Stadium. The upset loss took the Blue Devils out of a second ACC Championship game and allowed Georgia Tech to win the Coastal Division because Duke had also lost to Miami and Virginia Tech while Georgia Tech only had 2 conference losses.

Nonetheless, there is some tradition behind the football rivalry. The two teams first met in 1888, and the rivalry has been renewed every year since 1922. In the 1920s Duke began appearing as the last game of the Carolina football season with some regularity, Virginia being the other team with that spot. The Tar Heels-Blue Devils matchup would be the last regular season game for both teams for all but a few years from the 1930s until the ACC split into two divisions in 2005. Now the schedules are less predictable. The matchups at Wallace Wade Stadium in 2014 and 2016 took place on Thursday night and were televised on ESPN, adding national exposure to the rivalry.

== Other sports ==
Carlyle Cup

The rivalry between Duke and Carolina has spilled over into other arenas. From 2001 until 2011, the rivalry was strengthened by the awarding of the Carlyle Cup. This cup was given each year to the school that had the most combined head-to-head wins against the other school in all of the shared varsity sports. UNC claimed the cup 7 times, winning in 2002, 2005, 2006, 2008, 2009, 2010, and 2011. Duke won the cup 3 times, in 2001, 2003, and 2004. UNC and Duke tied for the cup in 2007.

Duke and Carolina have also developed a strong women's college basketball rivalry since the 1990s as Duke and Carolina field two of the strongest women's basketball teams in the nation. Duke made four Women's Final Four appearances in 1999, 2002, 2003, and 2006. Carolina made three Women's Final Four appearances in 1994 (winning its only NCAA Women's Division I Basketball Championship), 2006, and 2007.

In 1992 North Carolina defeated Duke by a 9–1 score in the NCAA championship game in women's soccer in a game played in Chapel Hill's Fetzer Field, a decided home advantage for the Tar Heels. UNC was led by future Team USA legends Kristine Lilly and Mia Hamm. This is the only time the two schools have ever met for a national championship in any sport.

In men's lacrosse the two schools have developed a fierce rivalry that carries national implications. Duke has won national championships in men's lacrosse in 2010, 2013, and 2014, while North Carolina has five titles. In 2007, 2008, and 2010, Duke and North Carolina played each other in the NCAA lacrosse quarterfinals, with Duke winning each time. The programs have also met 13 times in ACC postseason play, with UNC leading the overall rivalry 42–33 through 2020. For further information, see Duke–North Carolina lacrosse rivalry.

Twenty four students from the two schools got together from January 14–16, 2006 in order to attempt to break the world record for the longest continuous game of basketball ever recorded. The game set a new world record at 57 hours, 17 minutes and 41 seconds with Duke winning the game 3699–3444. All $60,000 raised from the marathon benefited the Hoop Dreams Basketball Academy, an organization which helps children with life-threatening illnesses develop successful life skills through basketball.

== Student Newspaper Rivalry ==
One day before each Duke-Carolina basketball game, The Chronicle, Duke's student newspaper, traditionally publishes a satirical cover page titled The Daily Tar Hole. The issue features parody articles referencing The Daily Tar Heel and the North Carolina Tar Heels. The Daily Tar Heel also traditionally publishes a satirical article by former columnist Ian Williams' titled "Insider's guide to hating Duke".

The two newspapers maintain a longstanding tradition tied to the outcome of the first matchup between the teams each season. If Duke wins, The Daily Tar Heel prints its masthead is printed in Duke blue. If Carolina wins, The Chronicle' prints its masthead in Carolina blue. The losing school's paper must also display the opposing school's logo prominently and include a statement declaring the winning school is "still the best."

== In popular culture ==
The Elder Scrolls III: Morrowind features multiple easter eggs referencing the rivalry, all of which were implemented by developer Mark Nelson, himself a Duke alumnus. The hapless wizard Tarhiel, who many players encounter early in the game, is a reference to the Tar Heels, and Eltonbrand, a sword that can be acquired during the vampire questline by fulfilling several conditions (involving completing a quest called "Shashev's Key", referencing Mike Krzyzewski), is a reference to Blue Devils player Elton Brand.

== See also ==
- Charles "Chick" Doak, the only person to ever serve as men's basketball head coach at both Duke and UNC
