= Carlyle Cup =

Trophy contested annually by the Duke Blue Devils and the North Carolina Tar Heels

- Duke Blue Devils North Carolina Tar Heels
- First meeting: 2000
- Latest meeting: 2011
- Trophy: Carlyle Cup

Statistics
- Total meetings: 11

- The Carlyle Cup
Originated	2000
Discontinued	2011
Trophy Series	North Carolina leads 7–3–1
Last Holder	North Carolina
Duke (3); 2000–01 2002–03; 2003–04	North Carolina (7); 2001–02 2004–05; 2005–06 2007–08; 2008–09 2009–10; 2010–11
- Ties (1); 2006–07

The Carlyle Cup was a sterling and enamel urn contested annually by the Duke Blue Devils and the North Carolina Tar Heels, from 2000 to 2011. It was awarded to the school that had the most combined head-to-head wins against the other school in all of the shared varsity sports for that academic year.

The Carlyle Cup was sponsored by and named for Carlyle & Co., a local jewelry business that declared bankruptcy in 2009. A scheme of 48 points was developed, covering twenty sports in which the schools met in competitions or conference standings. At the start of the 2010–11 season, the rivalry series was renamed the Battle of the Blues presented by Continental Tire.

Since the 2010–11 season, there has not been a recipient of the trophy.

== Results ==
Year	Winner	Result
2000–01	Duke	14½–11½
2001–02	North Carolina	17–9
2002–03	Duke	14–12
2003–04	Duke	14–12
2004–05	North Carolina	15–11
2005–06	North Carolina	14–12
2006–07	Tie (Cup retained by North Carolina)	13–13
2007–08	North Carolina	18–8
2008–09	North Carolina	15½–10½
2009–10	North Carolina	14–12
2010–11	North Carolina	14–12

== See also ==
- Carolina–Duke rivalry
- Victory Bell (Duke–North Carolina), the trophy awarded to the football winner
