= 2020–21 Metro Atlantic Athletic Conference men's basketball season =

- League: NCAA Division I
- Sport: Basketball
- Duration: November 25, 2020–March 20, 2021
- Teams: 11

Regular Season
- Regular season co-champions: Siena Saints & Monmouth Hawks
- Runners-up: Saint Peter's Peacocks & Marist Red Foxes
- Season MVP: Manny Camper (Siena)
- Top scorer: Isaiah Ross (Iona) 18.4

2021 MAAC Tournament
- Champions: Iona Gaels (13th)
- Runners-up: Fairfield Stags
- Finals MVP: Asante Gist (Iona)

Metro Atlantic Athletic Conference men's basketball seasons
- ← 2019–20 2021–22 →

2020–21 MAAC men's basketball standings
	Conf.				Overall
Team	W		L	PCT	W		L	PCT
Siena	12	–	4	.750	12	–	5	.706
Monmouth	12	–	6	.667	12	–	8	.600
Saint Peter's	10	–	8	.556	14	–	11	.560
Marist	10	–	8	.556	12	–	9	.571
Niagara	7	–	9	.438	9	–	11	.450
Canisius	7	–	5	.583	7	–	6	.538
Fairfield	7	–	11	.389	10	–	17	.370
Quinnipiac	7	–	10	.412	9	–	13	.409
Iona †	6	–	3	.667	12	–	6	.667
Manhattan	6	–	12	.333	7	–	13	.350
Rider	5	–	13	.278	6	–	17	.261
† 2021 MAAC tournament winner Note: The MAAC has ordered standings based on league wins, not winning percentage, since all teams did not reach 20 conference games played. These standings were also used for seeding purposes in the 2021 MAAC tournament.

The 2020–21 Metro Atlantic Athletic Conference (MAAC) men's basketball season began with practices in October 2020, followed by the start of the 2020–21 NCAA Division I men's basketball season on November 25. Conference play started in December and concluded in March 2021. This season was the 40th season of MAAC basketball.

Due to the COVID-19 pandemic in the United States, the MAAC revised their scheduling policy for conference games as follows:

- A 20-game double round robin conference schedule with five home series and five away series for each team.
- A Friday/Saturday playing schedule at the same venue for both games, with 24 hours of spacing between the two contests. The men’s and women’s schedules will mirror each other so that the women’s program may be playing a team for a 2-game home series, with the men’s program playing the same opponent on the road - and vice versa in subsequent weeks.
- Make up week retained for the second to last week of the season.
- The use of the same officiating crew for both games of a series, when possible.
- When teams are traveling, only institutional staff and student-athletes that are designated as Tier 1, along with Tier 2 Presidents, Athletic Directors, Senior Woman Administrators and key conference staff members are permitted entrance to a team’s facility.
- Retained a ban on fan attendance at venues through December.
- Approved the threshold for the minimum number of players available for the game to be contested as 8 counter (scholarship) players and at least one coach.

The 2021 MAAC tournament was held from March 8 through March 13 at the Jim Whelan Boardwalk Hall in Atlantic City, New Jersey for the second year in a row. For this season, since it was official that not all MAAC teams would reach the originally scheduled 20 conference game mark, team seeding in the tournament was based on overall conference regular season wins – not including any third games scheduled between teams in lieu of non-conference opponents. A tiebreaker system to seed teams with identical conference records was also used.

== Head coaches ==
=== Coaching changes ===
On March 13, 2020, Tim Cluess stepped down as head coach of the Iona Gaels due to health concerns. A day later, the school named former Louisville coach Rick Pitino the Gaels' new head coach.

=== Coaches ===
Team	Head coach	Previous job	Year at school	Overall record	MAAC record	MAAC Tournament championships
Canisius	Reggie Witherspoon	Chattanooga (asst.)	5	66–65	43–33	0
Fairfield	Jay Young	Rutgers (asst.)	2	12–20	8–12	0
Iona	Rick Pitino	Louisville	1	0–0	0–0	0
Manhattan	Steve Masiello	Louisville (asst.)	10	140–149	88–84	2
Marist	John Dunne	Saint Peter's	3	19–42	13–25	1
Monmouth	King Rice	Vanderbilt (asst.)	10	149–146	82–54	0
Niagara	Greg Paulus	George Washington (asst.)	2	12–20	9–11	0
Quinnipiac	Baker Dunleavy	Villanova (asst.)	4	43–51	28–28	0
Rider	Kevin Baggett	Rider (assoc. HC)	9	141–116	92–62	0
Saint Peter's	Shaheen Holloway	Seton Hall (asst.)	3	28–34	20–18	0
Siena	Carmen Maciariello	Siena (asst.)	2	20–10	15–5	0

Notes:

- All records, appearances, titles, etc. are from time with current school only.
- Year at school includes 2020–21 season.
- Overall and MAAC records are from time at current school and are before the beginning of the 2020–21 season.
- Previous jobs are head coaching jobs unless otherwise noted.

== Preseason ==
=== Preseason Coaches Poll ===
Rank	Team
1.	Siena (11)
2.	Iona
T3.	Monmouth
T3.	Saint Peter's
5.	Manhattan
6.	Niagara
7.	Quinnipiac
8.	Fairfield
9.	Marist
10.	Canisius
11.	Rider

( ) first place votes

=== Preseason All-MAAC teams ===
2020-21 MAAC Men's Basketball Preseason All-MAAC Teams
First Team	Second Team	Third Team
†Deion Hammond – Monmouth; †Marcus Hammond – Niagara; KC Ndefo – Saint Peter's; †Manny Camper – Siena; †Jalen Pickett – Siena	Majesty Brandon – Canisius; Asante Gist – Iona; Isaiah Ross – Iona; Warren Williams – Manhattan; Tyrese Williams – Quinnipiac	Jesus Cruz – Fairfield; Raheem Solomon – Niagara; Jacob Rigoni – Quinnipiac; Daryl Banks – Saint Peter's; Doug Edert – Saint Peter's

† denotes unanimous selection

=== Preseason Player of the Year ===
Recipient	School
†Jalen Pickett	Siena

== MAAC Regular Season ==
=== Conference matrix ===
This table summarizes the final head-to-head results between teams in conference play.

	Canisius	Fairfield	Iona	Manhattan	Marist	Monmouth	Niagara	Quinnipiac	Rider	Saint Peter's	Siena
vs. Canisius		1–1			1–1	2–0		0–2		0–2	1–1
vs. Fairfield	1–1		1–1	1–1	1–1		2–0	1–1	1–1	1–1	2–0
vs. Iona		1–1		1–1		0–2		1–0	0–2		
vs. Manhattan		1–1	1–1		2–0	2–0	0–2	1–1	1–1	2–0	2–0
vs. Marist	1–1	1–1		0–2		2–0	1–1	0–2	1–1	1–1	1–1
vs. Monmouth	0–2		2–0	0–2	0–2		1–1	0–2	0–2	1–1	2–0
vs. Niagara		0–2		2–0	1–1	1–1		1–1	1–1	2–0	1–1
vs. Quinnipiac	2–0	1–1	0–1	1–1	2–0	2–0	1–1		0–2	1–1	
vs. Rider		1–1	2–0	1–1	1–1	2–0	1–1	2–0		1–1	2–0
vs. Saint Peter's	2–0	1–1		0–2	1–1	1–1	0–2	1–1	1–1		1–1
vs. Siena	1–1	0–2		0–2	1–1	0–2	1–1		0–2	1–1	
Total	7–5	7–11	6–3	6–12	10–8	12–6	7–9	7–10	5–13	10–8	12–4

=== Player of the week ===
Throughout the regular season, the Metro Atlantic Athletic Conference offices named player(s) of the week and rookie(s) of the week.

Week	Player of the week	Rookie of the week
November 30, 2020	Fousseyni Drame, Saint Peter's	Tymu Chenery, Quinnipiac
December 7, 2020	Isaiah Ross, Iona	Nelly Junior Joseph, Iona
December 14, 2020	Ant Nelson, Manhattan	Hakim Byrd, Marist
December 21, 2020	Isaiah Ross (2), Iona	Nelly Junior Joseph (2), Iona
December 28, 2020	Isaiah Ross (3), Iona	Nelly Junior Joseph (3), Iona
January 4, 2021	Marcus Hammond, Niagara	Ricardo Wright, Marist
January 11, 2021	Manny Camper, Siena	Aidan Carpenter, Siena
January 18, 2021	Jordan King, Siena	Colin Golson, Jr., Siena
January 25, 2021	Dwight Murray, Jr., Rider	Ricardo Wright (2), Marist
February 1, 2021	Kobi Nwandu, Niagara	Ricardo Wright (3), Marist
February 8, 2021	Melik Martin, Monmouth	Luis Kortright, Quinnipiac
February 15, 2021	Elijah Buchanan, Manhattan	Nelly Junior Joseph (4), Iona
February 22, 2021	Malek Green, Canisius	Luis Kortright (2), Quinnipiac
March 1, 2021	Manny Camper (2), Siena	Luis Kortright (3), Quinnipiac
March 8, 2021	Jalen Pickett, Siena	Ricardo Wright (4), Marist

=== Records against other conferences ===
Records against non-conference foes for the 2020–21 season. Records shown for regular season only.

Power 7 Conferences	Record
American	0–0
ACC	0–2
Big East	0–5
Big Ten	–––
Big 12	–––
Pac-12	–––
SEC	–––
Power 7 Total	0–7
Other NCAA Division I Conferences	Record
America East	5–4
A-10	1–0
ASUN	–––
Big Sky	–––
Big South	–––
Big West	–––
CAA	1–3
C-USA	–––
Horizon League	–––
Ivy League	–––
MAC	–––
MEAC	2–1
MVC	–––
Mountain West	–––
NEC	2–1
OVC	–––
Patriot League	–––
Pacific West	–––
SoCon	–––
Southland	–––
SWAC	–––
The Summit	–––
Sun Belt	–––
WAC	–––
WCC	–––
Other Division I Total	11–9
NCAA Division I Total	11–16

== Postseason ==
=== MAAC Tournament ===
- 2021 Metro Atlantic Athletic Conference Basketball Tournament, Jim Whelan Boardwalk Hall, Atlantic City, New Jersey

First Round; Monday/Tuesday, March 8/9
8	Quinnipiac	48
9	Iona	72
7	Fairfield	59*
10	Manhattan	58
6	Canisius	76
11	Rider	78

Quarterfinals; Wednesday/Thursday, March 10/11
1	Siena	52
9	Iona	55
4	Marist	62
5	Niagara	67
2	Monmouth	60
7	Fairfield	79
3	Saint Peter's	75
11	Rider	58

Semifinals; Friday, March 12
9	Iona	70
5	Niagara	64
7	Fairfield	52
3	Saint Peter's	47

Championship; Saturday, March 13
9	Iona	60
7	Fairfield	51

* denotes number of overtimes

=== NCAA Tournament ===
Seed	Region	School	1st Round
15	East	Iona	L 55–68 vs. (2) Alabama – (Hinkle Fieldhouse|Indianapolis, IN

Game summary

TBS

March 20, 2021
4:00 pm

Recap

No. 15 Iona 55, No. 2 #5 Alabama 68
Scoring by half: 32–33, 23–35
Pts: Ross – 19; Rebs: Jr. Joseph – 6 Asts: 3 tied – 2 JeanLouis – 6 pts, 4 blk; Jr. Joseph – 6 pts, 3 blk	Pts: H. Jones – 20; Rebs: Petty, Jr. – 7 Asts: Ellis – 3 Quinerly – 11 pts, 3 reb, 2 ast
NCAA tournament first round

Hinkle Fieldhouse
Indianapolis, IN
Attendance:
Referees: Bo Boroski, Bill Covington, Todd Austin

== Honors and awards ==
=== MAAC Awards ===
2020-21 MAAC Men's Basketball Major Individual Awards
Award	Recipient(s)
Player of the Year	Manny Camper, Sr, G Siena
Coach of the Year	King Rice, Monmouth
Rookie of the Year	Nelly Junior Joseph, F, Iona
Defensive Player of the Year	KC Ndefo, Jr, G, Saint Peter's
Sixth Player of the Year	Malek Green, Jr, F, Canisius

2020-21 MAAC Men's Basketball All-Conference Teams
First Team	Second Team	Third Team	Rookie Team
†Manny Camper, Sr, G, Siena; †Deion Hammond, Sr, G, Monmouth; †KC Ndefo, Jr, G, Saint Peter's; Jalen Pickett, Jr, G, Siena; †Isaiah Ross, Sr, G, Iona	Marcus Hammond, Jr, G, Niagara; Dwight Murray, Jr., Jr, G, Rider; Kobi Nwandu, Sr, F, Niagara; George Papas, Sr, G, Monmouth; Jacob Rigoni, Sr, F, Quinnipiac	Darryl Banks III, So, G, Saint Peter's; Malek Green, Jr, F, Canisius; Jordan King, So, G, Siena; Melik Martin, Sr, F, Monmouth; Ant Nelson, Jr, G, Manhattan; Warren Williams, Jr, F, Manhattan	Hakim Byrd, Fr, G, Marist; †Tymu Chenery, Fr, G/F, Quinnipiac; †Nelly Junior Joseph, Fr, F, Iona; †Luis Kortright, Fr, G, Quinnipiac; †Ricardo Wright, Fr, G, Marist

† denotes unanimous selection

== All-MAAC tournament team ==
2021 MAAC Men's Basketball All-Championship Team
- Raheem Solomon, Niagara
- KC Ndefo, Saint Peter's
- Jake Wojcik, Fairfield
- Taj Benning, Fairfield
- Berrick Jeanlouis, Iona
- Isaiah Ross, Iona
- ^{MVP} Asante Gist, Iona

== 2020–21 Season statistic leaders ==
Completed for 2020–21 season

Scoring leaders
Rk	Player	PTS	PPG
1	Isaiah Ross (Iona)	332	18.4
2	Deion Hammond (Monmouth)	336	16.8
3	Dwight Murray (Rider)	364	15.8
4	Kobi Nwandu (Niagara)	292	14.6
5	Manny Camper (Siena)	240	14.1

Rebound leaders
Rk	Player	REB	RPG
1	Manny Camper (Siena)	165	9.7
2	Nelly Jr. Joseph (Iona)	135	7.5
3	Warren Williams (Manhattan)	146	7.3
4	Malek Green (Canisius)	91	7.0
5	Fousseyni Drame (Saint Peter's)	174	7.0

Field goal leaders (avg 5 fga/gm)
Rk	Player	FG	FGA	PCT
1	Jackson Stormo (Siena)	76	116	.655
2	Nelly Jr. Joseph (Iona)	81	136	.596
3	Jordan Jones (Marist)	78	132	.591
4	Warren Williams (Manhattan)	88	155	.568
5	Jacco Fritz (Canisius)	30	56	.536

Assist leaders
Rk	Player	AST	APG
1	Jalen Pickett (Siena)	67	4.8
2	Dwight Murray (Rider)	95	4.1
3	Manny Camper (Siena)	62	3.6
4	Asante Gist (Iona)	57	3.6
5	Matthew Lee (Saint Peter's)	89	3.6

Block leaders
Rk	Player	BLK	BPG
1	KC Ndefo (Saint Peter's)	91	3.64
2	Seth Pinkney (Quinnipiac)	51	2.32
3	Jordan Jones (Marist)	40	1.90
4	Nelly Jr. Joseph (Iona)	29	1.61
5	Warren Williams (Manhattan)	32	1.60

Free throw leaders
Rk	Player	FT	FTA	PCT
1	Asante Gist (Iona)	74	83	.892
2	Jacob Rigoni (Quinnipiac)	67	78	.859
3	Dwight Murray (Rider)	67	78	.859
4	Jake Wojcik (Fairfield)	76	89	.854
5	Taj Benning (Fairfield)	74	88	.841

Steal leaders
Rk	Player	STL	SPG
1	Berrick JeanLouis (Iona)	40	2.2
2	Miles Ruth (Monmouth)	36	1.8
3	Elijah Buchanan (Manhattan)	33	1.7
4	Samir Stewart (Manhattan)	24	1.5
5	Savion Lewis (Quinnipiac)	21	1.5

Three point leaders
Rk	Player	3P	3PA	%
1	Brendan McGuire (Quinnipiac)	19	42	.452
2	Allen Powell (Rider)	37	84	.440
3	Ryan Myers (Iona)	19	44	.431
4	Dwight Murray (Rider)	35	84	.417
5	Jordan Henderson (Canisius)	21	51	.412

=== Individual statistic NCAA Top 100 leaders ===
Scoring

- Isaiah Ross, Iona (18.4/game): 57th

Rebounding

- Manny Camper, Siena (9.7/game): 22nd

Field Goal Percentage (minimum avg 5 made per game)

- KC Ndefo, Saint Peter's (127–252 .504): 82nd

Assists per game

- Jalen Pickett, Siena (4.8/game): 57th

Blocks per game

- KC Ndefo, Saint Peter's (3.64/game): 1st (3rd in total blocks)
- Seth Pinkney, Quinnipiac (2.32/game): 22nd
- Jordan Jones, Marist (1.90/game): 39th
- Nelly Jr. Joseph, Iona (1.61/game): 65th
- Warren Williams, Manhattan (1.60/game): 68th

Free Throw Percentage (minimum avg 2.5 made per game)

- Asante Gist, Iona (74–83 .891): 16th
- Dwight Murray, Jr., Rider (67–78 .859): 49th
- Jacob Rigoni, Quinnipiac (65–76 .855): 53rd
- Jake Wojcik, Fairfield (76–89 .853): 57th
- Taj Benning, Fairfield (74–88 .840): 80th

Steals per game

- Berrick JeanLouis, Iona (2.22/game): 18th
- Miles Ruth, Monmouth (1.80/game): 66th
- Elijah Buchanan, Manhattan (1.74/game): 76th

Three-point percentage (minimum 1.5 made per game)

- Isaiah Ross, Iona (46–120 .383): 55th

=== Team statistic NCAA rankings ===
of 340 Division I teams

	Canisius	Fairfield	Iona	Manhattan	Marist	Monmouth	Niagara	Quinnipiac	Rider	Saint Peter's	Siena
Scoring/game	195 (70.4)	332 (61.8)	172 (71.3)	322 (63.4)	321 (63.4)	63 (76.0)	311 (64.7)	263 (67.5)	262 (67.5)	325 (63.2)	259 (67.6)
Defense/game	199 (71.2)	68 (66.7)	58 (66.1)	85 (67.2)	27 (63.6)	269 (74.3)	48 (65.2)	134 (69.0)	265 (74.0)	9 (61.5)	22 (63.0)
FG%	305 (.408)	323 (.398)	169 (.441)	337 (.378)	243 (.426)	260 (.422)	308 (.407)	315 (.401)	239 (.427)	317 (.400)	68 (.459)
FG% defense	254 (.452)	190 (.437)	26 (.402)	130 (.424)	11 (.391)	98 (.420)	131 (.424)	8 (.389)	284 (.462)	4 (.386)	42 (.408)
Three Point %	318 (.296)	276 (.315)	128 (.346)	339 (.264)	292 (.310)	61 (.363)	283 (.313)	240 (.323)	105 (.352)	244 (.322)	138 (.343)
Free Throw %	174 (.709)	218 (.695)	60 (.744)	290 (.665)	248 (.683)	179 (.707)	178 (.707)	236 (.687)	89 (.733)	213 (.697)	307 (.657)
Scoring margin	217 (-0.8)	276 (-4.9)	91 (5.2)	257 (-3.8)	204 (-0.2)	158 (1.7)	212 (-0.5)	224 (-1.5)	294 (-6.5)	159 (1.7)	106 (4.6)
Rebound margin	246 (-1.9)	160 (0.8)	47 (4.7)	199 (-0.6)	168 (0.4)	252 (-2.1)	307 (-4.5)	285 (-3.7)	215 (-0.8)	127 (1.8)	107 (2.3)
