= 2021 MAAC men's basketball tournament =

- Classification: Division I
- Season: 2020–21
- Teams: 11
- Site: Jim Whelan Boardwalk Hall; Atlantic City, New Jersey
- Champions: Iona (13th title)
- Winning coach: Rick Pitino (1st title)
- MVP: Asante Gist (Iona)
- Top scorer: Asante Gist (Iona) (65 points)
- Television: ESPNews, ESPNU, ESPN+

2020–21 MAAC men's basketball standings
	Conf.				Overall
Team	W		L	PCT	W		L	PCT
Siena	12	–	4	.750	12	–	5	.706
Monmouth	12	–	6	.667	12	–	8	.600
Saint Peter's	10	–	8	.556	14	–	11	.560
Marist	10	–	8	.556	12	–	9	.571
Niagara	7	–	9	.438	9	–	11	.450
Canisius	7	–	5	.583	7	–	6	.538
Fairfield	7	–	11	.389	10	–	17	.370
Quinnipiac	7	–	10	.412	9	–	13	.409
Iona †	6	–	3	.667	12	–	6	.667
Manhattan	6	–	12	.333	7	–	13	.350
Rider	5	–	13	.278	6	–	17	.261
† 2021 MAAC tournament winner Note: The MAAC has ordered standings based on league wins, not winning percentage, since all teams did not reach 20 conference games played. These standings were also used for seeding purposes in the 2021 MAAC tournament.

The 2021 Metro Atlantic Athletic Conference men's basketball tournament was the postseason men's basketball tournament for the Metro Atlantic Athletic Conference for the 2020–21 NCAA Division I men's basketball season. The tournament was played from March 8–13, 2021 at the Jim Whelan Boardwalk Hall in Atlantic City, New Jersey for the second year in a row. Since 2020's tournament was never fully completed, the defending champions were the 2018–19 Iona Gaels.

No. 9 seeded Iona won the 2021 MAAC Men's Basketball Tournament, defeating No. 7 seed Fairfield 60–51 in the championship game for their MAAC leading 13th championship. Their tournament run included knocking off top-seeded Siena in the quarterfinals, improving their record against the Saints in the MAAC Tournament to 11–0. This made it five consecutive MAAC Tournament championships for Iona, and the first time that a No. 9 seed reached and won the championship game. Iona received the MAAC's automatic bid to the 2021 NCAA tournament and were given a No. 15 seed.

== Seeds ==
All 11 teams in the conference participated in the tournament. The top five teams received byes to the quarterfinals. New procedures took effect for this season, as it was official that not all MAAC teams reached the originally scheduled 20 conference game mark. Team seeding was based on overall conference regular season wins – not including any third games scheduled between teams in lieu of non-conference opponents. A tiebreaker system to seed teams with identical conference records was also used.

Seed	School	Conference	Tiebreaker 1	Tiebreaker 2	Tiebreaker 3
1	Siena	12–3	2 wins vs MON (1)		
2	Monmouth	12–6	0 wins vs SIE (2)		
3	Saint Peter's	10–8	1 win vs MAR [3]	2 wins vs SIE & MON (3)	
4	Marist	10–8	1 win vs SPC [3]	1 win vs SIE & MON (4)	
5	Niagara	7–9	3 wins vs CAN, FF, QUINN [5]	0 wins vs CAN [5]	2 wins vs SIE & MON (5)
6	Canisius	7–5	3 wins vs NIA, FF, QUINN [5]	0 wins vs NIA [5]	1 win vs SIE & MON (6)
7	Fairfield	7–11	2 wins vs NIA, CAN, QUINN [7]	1 win vs QUINN [7]	2 wins vs SPC & MAR (7)
8	Quinnipiac	7–10	2 wins vs NIA, CAN, FF [7]	1 win vs FF [7]	1 win vs SPC & MAR (8)
9	Iona	6–3	1 win vs MAN [9]	2 wins vs SIE & MON (9)	
10	Manhattan	6–12	1 win vs IONA [9]	0 wins vs SIE & MON (10)	
11	Rider	5–13			

== Schedule ==
Session	Game	Time*	Matchup	Score	Attendance	Television
First Round – Monday, March 8
1	1	7:00 pm	No. 6 Canisius vs No. 11 Rider	76–78		ESPN+
First Round– Tuesday, March 9
2	2	5:00 pm	No. 8 Quinnipiac vs No. 9 Iona	48–72		ESPN+
2	3	7:30 pm	No. 7 Fairfield vs No. 10 Manhattan	59–58^{OT}		ESPN+
Quarterfinals – Wednesday, March 10
3	4	5:00 pm	No. 1 Siena vs No. 9 Iona	52–55		ESPN+
3	5	7:30 pm	No. 2 Monmouth vs No. 7 Fairfield	60–79		ESPN+
Quarterfinals – Thursday, March 11
4	6	5:00 pm	No. 3 Saint Peter's vs No. 11 Rider	75–60		ESPN+
4	7	7:30 pm	No. 4 Marist vs No. 5 Niagara	62–67		ESPN+
Semifinals – Friday, March 12
5	8	5:30 pm	No. 5 Niagara vs No. 9 Iona	64–70		ESPNews
5	9	8:00 pm	No. 3 Saint Peter's vs No. 7 Fairfield	47–52		ESPNU
Championship – Saturday, March 13
6	10	4:00 pm	No. 7 Fairfield vs No. 9 Iona	51–60		ESPNU
*Game times in ET. ( )-Rankings denote tournament seeding. *Attendance is restricted to family and special guests due to the COVID-19 pandemic

== Bracket ==
First round Monday/Tuesday, March 8/9
8	Quinnipiac	48
9	Iona	72
7	Fairfield	59
10	Manhattan	58^{OT}
6	Canisius	76
11	Rider	78

Quarterfinals; Wednesday/Thursday, March 10/11
1	Siena	52
9	Iona	55
4	Marist	62
5	Niagara	67
2	Monmouth	60
7	Fairfield	79
3	Saint Peter's	75
11	Rider	58

Semifinals; Friday, March 12
9	Iona	70
5	Niagara	64
7	Fairfield	52
3	Saint Peter's	47

Championship; Saturday, March 13
9	Iona	60
7	Fairfield	51

* denotes number of overtimes

== Game summaries ==
=== First round ===
ESPN+

March 8, 2021
7:00 pm

Recap

No. 6 Canisius 76, No. 11 Rider 78
Scoring by half: 42–36, 34–42
Pts: Henderson – 16; Rebs: Harried – 8 Asts: Fofana – 3 M. Green – 13 pts, 6 reb, 2 blk	Pts: Murray, Jr. – 22; Rebs: McQuarter – 11; Asts: Murray, Jr. – 5 Powell – 19 pts, 2 stl

Jim Whelan Boardwalk Hall
Atlantic City, NJ
Attendance: 0
Referees: Ron Tyburski, Adam Vandenburgh, Matt Palumb

ESPN+

March 9, 2021
5:00 pm

Recap

No. 8 Quinnipiac 48, No. 9 Iona 72
Scoring by half: 20–25, 28–47
Pts: Kortright – 7 Rebs: Rigoni – 6 Asts: Lewis – 8 Kortright 4 reb, 1 stl	Pts: Ross – 15; Rebs: JeanLouis – 11; Asts: 4 tied – 2 van Eyck – 10 reb. Shema – 9 pts, 10 reb

Jim Whelan Boardwalk Hall
Atlantic City, NJ
Attendance: 0
Referees: Adam Vandenburgh, Ryan Corbett, Mike Kitts, Jr.

ESPN+

March 9, 2021
7:30 pm

Recap

No. 7 Fairfield 59, No. 10 Manhattan 58 (OT)
Scoring by half: 16–25, 34–25 Overtime: 9–8
Pts: Cruz – 16; Rebs: Benning – 8 Asts: Green & Benning – 2 Wojcik – 15 pts, 5 reb. Benning – 9 pts, 3 stl	Pts: Nelson – 16; Rebs: Diallo & Nelson – 11; Asts: Stewart – 5 Buchanan – 9 pts, 6 reb, 3 blk

Jim Whelan Boardwalk Hall
Atlantic City, NJ
Attendance: 0
Referees: Ron Tyburski, Tony Meeks, Andy O'Brien

=== Quarterfinals ===
ESPN+

March 10, 2021
5:00 pm

Recap

No. 1 Siena 52, No. 9 Iona 55
Scoring by half: 24–21, 28–34
Pts: Stormo – 14; Rebs: Pickett – 8 Asts: Pickett – 5 Pickett – 13 pts	Pts: Gist – 16; Rebs: Jr. Joseph & van Eyck – 8 Asts: Gist & Jr. Joseph – 3 Ross – 14pts, 7 reb. JeanLouis – 13 pts, 5 stl

Jim Whelan Boardwalk Hall
Atlantic City, NJ
Attendance: 0
Referees: Matt Palumb, Ryan Corbett, Mike Kitts, Jr.

ESPN+

March 10, 2021
7:30 pm

Recap

No. 2 Monmouth 60, No. 7 Fairfield 79
Scoring by half: 34–41, 26–38
Pts: M. Martin – 12; Rebs: McClary – 5 Asts: D. Hammond – 3 Papas – 9 pts, 3 stl, 3 reb	Pts: Benning – 24; Rebs: Cook – 14; Asts: C. Green – 4 Benning – 12 reb, 2 blk. Cook – 11 pts

Jim Whelan Boardwalk Hall
Atlantic City, NJ
Attendance: 0
Referees: Kal Sabie, Andy O'Brien, Adam Vandenburgh

ESPN+

March 11, 2021
5:00 pm

Recap

No. 3 Saint Peter's 75, No. 11 Rider 60
Scoring by half: 33–36, 42–24
Pts: Banks III – 20; Rebs: Ndefo – 7 Asts: Ndefo & Lee – 4 Ndefo – 18 pts, 1 blk, 1 stl	Pts: Murray, Jr. & Henderson, Jr. – 15; Rebs: Murray, Jr. – 5 Asts: Murray, Jr. – 5 Henderson, Jr. – 3 stl

Jim Whelan Boardwalk Hall
Atlantic City, NJ
Attendance: 0
Referees: Ron Tyburski, Tony Meeks, Matt Palumb

ESPN+

March 11, 2021
7:30 pm

Recap

No. 4 Marist 62, No. 5 Niagara 67
Scoring by half: 20–28, 42–39
Pts: Jones – 14; Rebs: Jones – 10; Asts: Wright & Sullivan – 2 Herasme – 11 pts, 7 reb	Pts: Solomon – 17; Rebs: M. Hammond – 9 Asts: Solomon – 4 Nwandu – 15 pts, 5 reb, 2 ast, 2 stl, 3 blk

Jim Whelan Boardwalk Hall
Atlantic City, NJ
Attendance: 0
Referees: Andy O'Brien, Michael Kitts, Ryan Corbett

=== Semifinals ===
ESPNews

March 12, 2021
5:30 pm

Recap

No. 9 Iona 70, No. 5 Niagara 64
Scoring by half: 43–25, 27–39
Pts: Gist – 19; Rebs: Jr. Joseph – 9 Asts: Gist – 5 van Eyck – 14 pts, 5 reb	Pts: Solomon – 21; Rebs: Solomon – 8 Asts: M. Hammond – 5 Nwandu – 16 pts, 3 reb, 2 stl

Jim Whelan Boardwalk Hall
Atlantic City, NJ
Attendance: 0
Referees: Andy O'Brien, Adam Vandenburgh, Mike Kitts, Jr.

ESPNU

March 12, 2021
8:00 pm

Recap

No. 7 Fairfield 52, No. 3 Saint Peter's 47
Scoring by half: 22–24, 23–30
Pts: Green – 14; Rebs: Wojcik – 7 Asts: Cruz & Crisler – 2 Cruz – 12 pts, 3 reb, 1 stl, 2 blk	Pts: Edert & Ndefo – 11; Rebs: Ndefo – 12; Asts: Lee – 5 Ndefo – 5 blk

Jim Whelan Boardwalk Hall
Atlantic City, NJ
Attendance: 0
Referees: Ron Tyburski, Brandon Cruz, Ryan Corbett

=== Championship ===
ESPNU

March 13, 2021
4:00 pm

Recap

No. 9 Iona 60, No. 7 Fairfield 51
Scoring by half: 30–18, 30–33
Pts: Gist – 18; Rebs: Jr. Joseph – 11; Asts: JeanLouis – 4 Jr. Joseph – 12 pts, 1 stl, 3 blk	Pts: Wojcik – 13; Rebs: Wojcik – 8 Asts: Green – 3 Benning – 11 pts, 4 reb. Wojcik – 3 stl

Jim Whelan Boardwalk Hall
Atlantic City, NJ
Attendance: 0
Referees: Brandon Cruz, Andy O'Brien, Adam Vandenburgh

== Team and tournament leaders ==
=== Team leaders ===
Team	Points		Rebounds		Assists		Steals		Blocks		Minutes		W – L
Canisius	J. Henderson	16	Harried	8	Fofana	3	Fritz	2	Green	2	J. Henderson	36	0–1
Fairfield	Wojcik	51	Benning	30	Green	10	Benning	5	Benning & Cruz	4	Wojcik	153	3–1
Iona	Gist	65	Jr. Joseph	37	Gist	11	JeanLouis	9	Jr. Joseph	3	Ross	149	4–0
Manhattan	Nelson	16	Nelson & Diallo	11	Stewart	5	Nelson & Ebube	2	Buchanan	3	Stewart	40	0–1
Marist	Jones	14	Jones	10	Wright & Sullivan	2	3 tied	1	Bell	2	Herasme	33	0–1
Monmouth	Martin	13	McClary	5	D. Hammond	3	3 tied	3	Ruth	2	Papas	35	0–1
Niagara	Solomon	38	M. Hammond	14	M. Hammond	7	MacDonald	5	Nwandu	3	M. Hammond	76	1–1
Quinnipiac	Kortright	7	Rigoni	6	Lewis	8	5 tied	1	Pinkney & Chenery	1	Rigoni	29	0–1
Rider	Murray Jr.	37	McQuarter	12	Murray Jr.	10	McQuarter & Henderson Jr.	3	Henderson Jr.	2	Murray Jr.	74	1–1
Saint Peter's	Ndefo	29	Ndefo	19	Lee	9	Lee	4	Ndefo	6	Edert	72	1–1
Siena	Stormo	14	Pickett	8	Pickett	5	Camper	3	Stormo	3	Camper	40	0–1

== All-championship team ==
2021 MAAC Men's Basketball All-Championship Team
- Raheem Solomon, Niagara – 19 ppg, 6.5 rpg
- KC Ndefo, Saint Peter's – 14.5 ppg, 9.5 rpg, 3 bpg
- Jake Wojcik, Fairfield – 12.8 ppg, 6 rpg, 38.3 mpg
- Taj Benning, Fairfield – 11.8 ppg, 7.5 rpg, 37 mpg
- Berrick Jeanlouis, Iona – 8.8 ppg, 5.8 rpg, 36.8 mpg
- Isaiah Ross, Iona – 11.5 ppg, 5.5 rpg, 37.3 mpg
- ^{MVP} Asante Gist, Iona – 16.3 ppg, 2.8 apg, 32.8 mpg

== See also ==
- 2021 MAAC women's basketball tournament
