= 2020–21 Monmouth Hawks men's basketball team =

American college basketball season

2020–21 Monmouth Hawks men's basketball
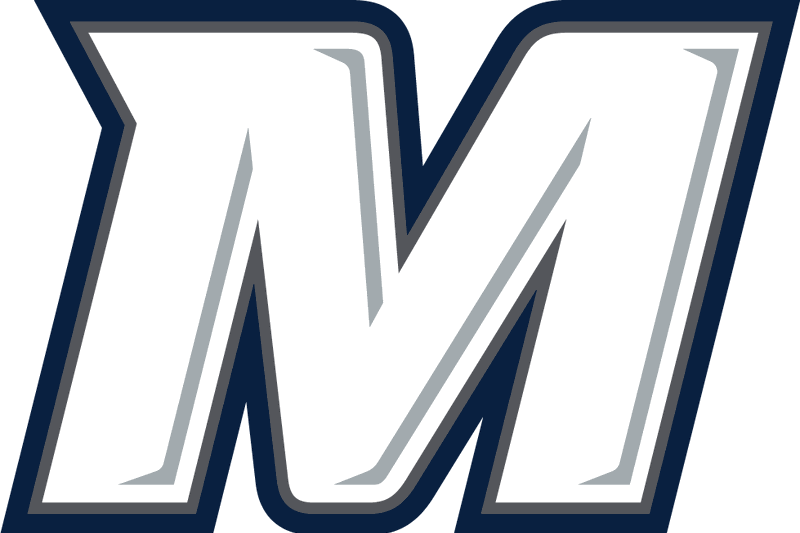

MAAC regular season co-champions
- Conference: Metro Atlantic Athletic Conference
- Record: 12–8 (12–6 MAAC)
- Head coach: King Rice (10th season)
- Assistant coaches: Rick Callahan; Jamal Meeks; JR Reid
- Home arena: OceanFirst Bank Center

2020–21 MAAC men's basketball standings
	Conf.				Overall
Team	W		L	PCT	W		L	PCT
Siena	12	–	4	.750	12	–	5	.706
Monmouth	12	–	6	.667	12	–	8	.600
Saint Peter's	10	–	8	.556	14	–	11	.560
Marist	10	–	8	.556	12	–	9	.571
Niagara	7	–	9	.438	9	–	11	.450
Canisius	7	–	5	.583	7	–	6	.538
Fairfield	7	–	11	.389	10	–	17	.370
Quinnipiac	7	–	10	.412	9	–	13	.409
Iona †	6	–	3	.667	12	–	6	.667
Manhattan	6	–	12	.333	7	–	13	.350
Rider	5	–	13	.278	6	–	17	.261
† 2021 MAAC tournament winner Note: The MAAC has ordered standings based on league wins, not winning percentage, since all teams did not reach 20 conference games played. These standings were also used for seeding purposes in the 2021 MAAC tournament.

The 2020–21 Monmouth Hawks men's basketball team represented Monmouth University in the 2020–21 NCAA Division I men's basketball season. The Hawks, led by tenth-year head coach King Rice, played their home games at OceanFirst Bank Center in West Long Branch, New Jersey as members of the Metro Atlantic Athletic Conference. They finished the season 12–8, 12–6 in MAAC play to finish in a tie for first place. As the No. 2 seed in the MAAC tournament, they lost in the quarterfinals to No. 7 seed Fairfield 60–79.

== Previous season ==
The Hawks finished the 2019–20 season 18–13 overall, 12–8 in MAAC play to finish in a tie for third place. Before they could face #5 seeded Quinnipiac in the MAAC tournament quarterfinals, all postseason tournaments were cancelled amid the COVID-19 pandemic.

== Roster ==
2020–21 Monmouth Hawks men's basketball team
Players
Coaches

Pos.	#	Name	Height	Weight	Year	Previous school	Hometown
F	0	Myles Foster	6 ft 7 in (2.01 m)	230 lb (104 kg)	Fr	Brooks School	Brooklyn, New York
G	1	Gob Gabriel	6 ft 7 in (2.01 m)	175 lb (79 kg)	So	Bradford Christian Academy	Manchester, New Hampshire
F	2	Melik Martin	6 ft 6 in (1.98 m)	200 lb (91 kg)	Sr	York Catholic High School	York, Pennsylvania
G	3	Deion Hammond	6 ft 5 in (1.96 m)	215 lb (98 kg)	Sr	Riverdale Baptist School	Mitchellville, Maryland
G	4	Donovann Toatley	5 ft 9 in (1.75 m)	185 lb (84 kg)	RS So	Chattanooga	Largo, Maryland
G	5	George Papas	6 ft 5 in (1.96 m)	175 lb (79 kg)	Sr	Gould Academy	Jersey City, New Jersey
F	10	Jarvis Vaughan	6 ft 9 in (2.06 m)	225 lb (102 kg)	So	Massanutten Military Academy	Churchville, Virginia
G	11	Mateo Delmoral	6 ft 0 in (1.83 m)	170 lb (77 kg)	Jr	Brookdale Community College	Cliffwood Beach, New Jersey
G	13	Marcus McClary	6 ft 3 in (1.91 m)	195 lb (88 kg)	Sr	The Patrick School	Linden, New Jersey
G	14	Jack Holmstrom	6 ft 5 in (1.96 m)	200 lb (91 kg)	Fr	Guilford High School	Rockford, Illinois
G	15	Mike James Jr.	6 ft 0 in (1.83 m)	170 lb (77 kg)	Jr	Malverne High School	West Hempstead, New York
F	21	Nikkei Rutty	6 ft 8 in (2.03 m)	225 lb (102 kg)	Jr	Trinity-Pawling School	New Rochelle, New York
G	24	Myles Ruth	6 ft 0 in (1.83 m)	150 lb (68 kg)	Fr	Don Bosco Prep	Hillside, New Jersey
G	25	Samuel Chaput	6 ft 0 in (1.83 m)	175 lb (79 kg)	Jr	St. Anthony High School	Longueuil, Quebec
F	30	Klemen Vuga	6 ft 9 in (2.06 m)	230 lb (104 kg)	Fr	Virginia Episcopal School	Mengeš, Slovenia

Head coach

- King Rice (North Carolina)

Assistant coach(es)

- Rick Callahan (Salem International)
- Jamal Meeks (Indiana)
- JR Reid (North Carolina)

Legend

- (C) Team captain
- (S) Suspended
- (I) Ineligible
- (W) Walk-on
- Injured
- Current redshirt

Roster
Last update: February 2, 2021

== Schedule and results ==
Date time, TV	Rank^{#}	Opponent^{#}	Result	Record	Site (attendance) city, state
Non-conference regular season
December 1, 2020*; 7:00 pm, BTN		at Maryland	Canceled		Xfinity Center; College Park, MD
December 4, 2020*; 7:00 pm		St. Francis Brooklyn	Canceled		OceanFirst Bank Center; West Long Branch, NJ
December 15, 2020*; 7:00 pm, ESPN3		Hofstra	L 88–96	0–1	OceanFirst Bank Center; West Long Branch, NJ
MAAC regular season
December 18, 2020; 5:00 pm, ESPN3		Saint Peter's	W 78–76	1–1 (1–0)	OceanFirst Bank Center; West Long Branch, NJ
December 19, 2020; 5:00 pm, ESPN3		Saint Peter's	L 76–78	1–2 (1–1)	OceanFirst Bank Center; West Long Branch, NJ
December 27, 2020; 2:00 pm, ESPN3		Canisius	W 84–66	2–2 (2–1)	OceanFirst Bank Center; West Long Branch, NJ
December 28, 2021; 2:00 pm, ESPN+		Canisius	W 97–69	3–2 (3–1)	OceanFirst Bank Center; West Long Branch, NJ
January 3, 2021; 3:00 pm, ESPN+		at Siena	L 77–78	3–3 (3–2)	Alumni Recreation Center; Loudonville, NY
January 4, 2021; 5:00 pm, ESPN3		at Siena	L 62–76	3–4 (3–3)	Alumni Recreation Center; Loudonville, NY
January 9, 2021; 2:00 pm, ESPN+		Marist	W 80–64	4–4 (4–3)	OceanFirst Bank Center; West Long Branch, NJ
January 10, 2021; 2:00 pm, ESPN3		Marist	W 72–62	5–4 (5–3)	OceanFirst Bank Center; West Long Branch, NJ
January 15, 2021; 5:00 pm, ESPN3		Quinnipiac	W 92–80 ^{OT}	6–4 (6–3)	OceanFirst Bank Center; West Long Branch, NJ
January 16, 2021; 5:00 pm, ESPN3		Quinnipiac	W 70–63	7–4 (7–3)	OceanFirst Bank Center; West Long Branch, NJ
January 29, 2021; 4:00 pm, ESPN+		at Niagara	W 77–67	8–4 (8–3)	Gallagher Center; Lewiston, NY
January 30, 2021; 4:00 pm, ESPN3		at Niagara	L 74–83	8–5 (8–4)	Gallagher Center; Lewiston, NY
February 5, 2021; 9:00 pm, ESPNU		at Manhattan	W 70–65	9–5 (9–4)	Draddy Gymnasium; Riverdale, NY
February 6, 2021; 9:00 pm, ESPN3		at Manhattan	W 71–69 ^{OT}	10–5 (10–4)	Draddy Gymnasium; Riverdale, NY
February 19, 2021; 7:00 pm, ESPNU		at Iona	L 86–91	10–6 (10–5)	Hynes Athletic Center; New Rochelle, NY
February 20, 2021; 7:00 pm, ESPN+		at Iona	L 65–88	10–7 (10–6)	Hynes Athletic Center; New Rochelle, NY
March 4, 2021; 4:00 pm, ESPN+		at Rider	W 77–74 ^{OT}	11–7 (11–6)	Alumni Gymnasium; Lawrenceville, NJ
March 5, 2021; 4:00 pm, ESPNU		at Rider	W 65–62	12–7 (12–6)	Alumni Gymnasium; Lawrenceville, NJ
MAAC tournament
March 10, 2021; 7:30 pm, ESPN+	(2)	vs. (7) Fairfield; Quarterfinals	L 60–79	12–8	Boardwalk Hall; Atlantic City, NJ
*Non-conference game. ^{#}Rankings from AP Poll. (#) Tournament seedings in parentheses. All times are in Eastern.
