= 2020–21 Rider Broncs men's basketball team =

American college basketball season

2020–21 Rider Broncs men's basketball
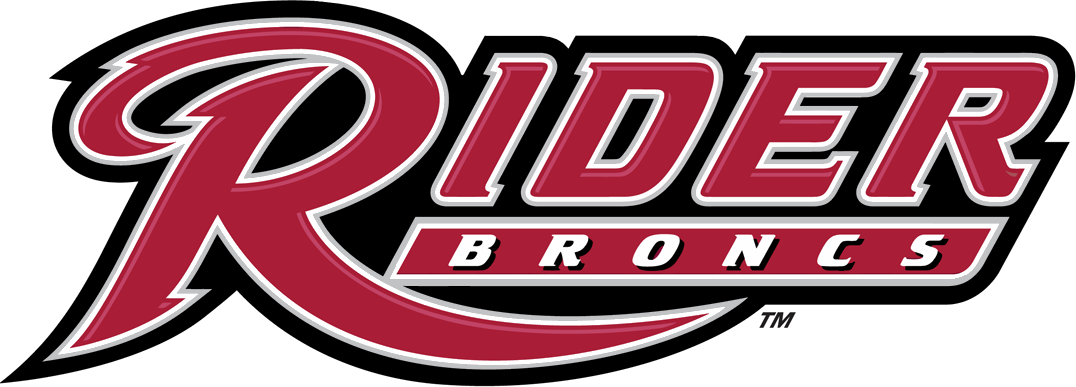
- Conference: Metro Atlantic Athletic Conference
- Record: 6–17 (5–13 MAAC)
- Head coach: Kevin Baggett (9th season)
- Associate head coach: Dino Presley
- Assistant coaches: Marlon Guild; Geoff Arnold
- Home arena: Alumni Gymnasium

2020–21 MAAC men's basketball standings
	Conf.				Overall
Team	W		L	PCT	W		L	PCT
Siena	12	–	4	.750	12	–	5	.706
Monmouth	12	–	6	.667	12	–	8	.600
Saint Peter's	10	–	8	.556	14	–	11	.560
Marist	10	–	8	.556	12	–	9	.571
Niagara	7	–	9	.438	9	–	11	.450
Canisius	7	–	5	.583	7	–	6	.538
Fairfield	7	–	11	.389	10	–	17	.370
Quinnipiac	7	–	10	.412	9	–	13	.409
Iona †	6	–	3	.667	12	–	6	.667
Manhattan	6	–	12	.333	7	–	13	.350
Rider	5	–	13	.278	6	–	17	.261
† 2021 MAAC tournament winner Note: The MAAC has ordered standings based on league wins, not winning percentage, since all teams did not reach 20 conference games played. These standings were also used for seeding purposes in the 2021 MAAC tournament.

The 2020–21 Rider Broncs men's basketball team represented Rider University in the 2020–21 NCAA Division I men's basketball season. The Broncs, led by ninth-year head coach Kevin Baggett, played their home games at the Alumni Gymnasium in Lawrenceville, New Jersey as members of the Metro Atlantic Athletic Conference. They finished the season 6–17, 5–13 in MAAC play to finish in last place. As the No. 11 seed in the MAAC tournament, they defeated No. 6 seed Canisius in the first round before losing in the quarterfinals to No. 3 seed Saint Peter's 60–75.

== Previous season ==
The Broncs finished the 2019–20 season 18–12 overall, 12–8 in MAAC play to finish in a tie for third place. Before they could face #6 seeded Niagara in the MAAC tournament quarterfinals, all postseason tournaments were cancelled amid the COVID-19 pandemic.

== Roster ==
2020–21 Rider Broncs men's basketball team
Players
Coaches

Pos.	#	Name	Height	Weight	Year	Previous school	Hometown
G	0	Christian Ings	6 ft 2 in (1.88 m)	176 lb (80 kg)	So	Neumann-Goretti High School	Philadelphia, Pennsylvania
G	2	Allen Powell	6 ft 2 in (1.88 m)	165 lb (75 kg)	So	La Salle College High School	Philadelphia, Pennsylvania
G	3	Rodney Henderson, Jr.	6 ft 5 in (1.96 m)	185 lb (84 kg)	GS	Cal State Northridge	Carson, California
G	5	Dwight Murray, Jr.	6 ft 0 in (1.83 m)	180 lb (82 kg)	Jr	Incarnate Word	Austell, Georgia
F	10	Ajiri Ogemuno-Johnson	6 ft 8 in (2.03 m)	210 lb (95 kg)	Jr	Monsignor Bonner High School	Delta State, Nigeria
F	11	Tyrel Bladen	6 ft 10 in (2.08 m)	230 lb (104 kg)	RS So	Coatesville High School	Coatesville, Pennsylvania
G	12	Jordan Smalls	6 ft 7 in (2.01 m)	185 lb (84 kg)	Fr	Eagle's Landing Christian Academy	Jonesboro, Georgia
G	13	Jaelen McGlone	6 ft 4 in (1.93 m)	205 lb (93 kg)	Fr	Cheltenham High School	Cheltenham, Pennsylvania
G	14	Dontrell McQuarter	6 ft 7 in (2.01 m)	180 lb (82 kg)	Jr	Hinds Community College	Baton Rouge, Louisiana
G	15	R.J. Weise	6 ft 0 in (1.83 m)	185 lb (84 kg)	Fr	Allentown High School	Allentown, New Jersey
G	20	Jeremiah Pope	6 ft 4 in (1.93 m)	180 lb (82 kg)	Jr	Brunswick Community College	Clinton, North Carolina
G	22	Elijah Perry	6 ft 2 in (1.88 m)	185 lb (84 kg)	Fr	St. Thomas More School	Queens, New York
G/F	23	Malachi de Sousa	6 ft 6 in (1.98 m)	200 lb (91 kg)	Jr	Albany	Beacon, New York
F	24	Lawrence Foreman	6 ft 9 in (2.06 m)	235 lb (107 kg)	Fr	Woodstock Academy	Kingston, Jamaica
G	25	Corey McKeithan	5 ft 10 in (1.78 m)	165 lb (75 kg)	Fr	Windsor High School	Windsor, Connecticut
F	35	Nehemiah Benson	6 ft 7 in (2.01 m)	215 lb (98 kg)	Fr	Lutheran High School East	Streetsboro, Ohio

Head coach

- Kevin Baggett (Saint Joseph's)

Assistant coach(es)

- Dino Presley (Kutztown)
- Marlon Guild (Hartford)
- Geoff Arnold (Saint Joseph's)

Legend

- (C) Team captain
- (S) Suspended
- (I) Ineligible
- (W) Walk-on
- Injured
- Current redshirt

Roster
Last update: January 15, 2021

== Schedule and results ==
Date time, TV	Rank^{#}	Opponent^{#}	Result	Record	Site (attendance) city, state
Regular season
December 5, 2020*; 7:00 pm, YES		at Syracuse	L 52–87	0–1	Carrier Dome; Syracuse, NY
December 8, 2020*; 7:00 pm, CBSSN		at St. John's	L 79–82	0–2	Carnesecca Arena; Queens, NY
December 11, 2020; 6:00 pm, ESPN3		at Manhattan	W 82–64	1–2 (1–0)	Draddy Gymnasium; Riverdale, NY
December 12, 2020; 6:00 pm, ESPN3		at Manhattan	L 77–87	1–3 (1–1)	Draddy Gymnasium; Riverdale, NY
December 18, 2020; 7:00 pm, ESPN+		Iona	L 56–70	1–4 (1–2)	Alumni Gymnasium; Lawrenceville, NJ
December 19, 2020; 7:00 pm, ESPN+		Iona	L 64–72	1–5 (1–3)	Alumni Gymnasium; Lawrenceville, NJ
December 23, 2020*; 2:00 pm, ESPN+		NJIT	L 66–81	1–6	Alumni Gymnasium; Lawrenceville, NJ
December 29, 2020*; 7:00 pm		Coppin State	Canceled due to COVID-19		Alumni Gymnasium; Lawrenceville, NJ
January 1, 2021; 5:00 pm, ESPN+		at Fairfield	W 70–62	2–6 (2–3)	Alumni Hall; Fairfield, CT
January 2, 2021; 5:00 pm, ESPN+		at Fairfield	L 56–72	2–7 (2–4)	Alumni Hall; Fairfield, CT
January 8, 2021; 4:00 pm, ESPN+		at Niagara	W 76–70	3–7 (3–4)	Gallagher Center; Lewiston, NY
January 9, 2021; 4:00 pm, ESPN3		at Niagara	L 55–66	3–8 (3–5)	Gallagher Center; Lewiston, NY
January 15, 2021; 7:00 pm, ESPN+		Siena	L 69–78	3–9 (3–6)	Alumni Gymnasium; Lawrenceville, NJ
January 16, 2021; 7:00 pm, ESPN3		Siena	L 72–74	3–10 (3–7)	Alumni Gymnasium; Lawrenceville, NJ
January 22, 2021; 7:00 pm, ESPN3		Marist	W 76–64	4–10 (4–7)	Alumni Gymnasium; Lawrenceville, NJ
January 23, 2021; 7:00 pm, ESPN+		Marist	L 67–76	4–11 (4–8)	Alumni Gymnasium; Lawrenceville, NJ
February 20, 2021; 4:00 pm		at Quinnipiac	L 64–80	4–12 (4–9)	People's United Center; Hamden, CT
February 21, 2021; 4:00 pm		at Quinnipiac	L 68–93	4–13 (4–10)	People's United Center; Hamden, CT
February 26, 2021; 8:00 pm, ESPN+		at Saint Peter's	L 52–66	4–14 (4–11)	John J. Moore Athletics Center; Jersey City, NJ
February 27, 2021; 8:00 pm, ESPN3		at Saint Peter's	W 78–65	5–14 (5–11)	John J. Moore Athletics Center; Jersey City, NJ
March 4, 2021; 4:00 pm, ESPN+		Monmouth	L 74–77 ^{OT}	5–15 (5–12)	Alumni Gymnasium; Lawrenceville, NJ
March 5, 2021; 4:00 pm, ESPNU		Monmouth	L 62–65	5–16 (5–13)	Alumni Gymnasium; Lawrenceville, NJ
MAAC tournament
March 8, 2021; 7:00 pm, ESPN+	(11)	vs. (6) Canisius; First round	W 78–76	6–16	Boardwalk Hall; Atlantic City, NJ
March 11, 2021; 5:00 pm, ESPN+	(11)	vs. (3) Saint Peter's; Quarterfinals	L 60–75	6–17	Boardwalk Hall; Atlantic City, NJ
*Non-conference game. ^{#}Rankings from AP Poll. (#) Tournament seedings in parentheses. All times are in Eastern.
