= 2020–21 Quinnipiac Bobcats men's basketball team =

American college basketball season

2020–21 Quinnipiac Bobcats men's basketball
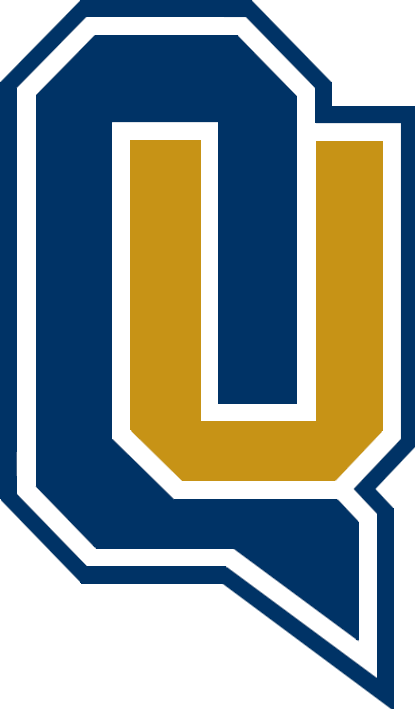
- Conference: Metro Atlantic Athletic Conference
- Record: 9–13 (7–10 MAAC)
- Head coach: Baker Dunleavy (4th season)
- Associate head coach: Tom Pecora
- Assistant coaches: Shaun Morris; Dwayne Lee
- Home arena: People's United Center

2020–21 MAAC men's basketball standings
	Conf.				Overall
Team	W		L	PCT	W		L	PCT
Siena	12	–	4	.750	12	–	5	.706
Monmouth	12	–	6	.667	12	–	8	.600
Saint Peter's	10	–	8	.556	14	–	11	.560
Marist	10	–	8	.556	12	–	9	.571
Niagara	7	–	9	.438	9	–	11	.450
Canisius	7	–	5	.583	7	–	6	.538
Fairfield	7	–	11	.389	10	–	17	.370
Quinnipiac	7	–	10	.412	9	–	13	.409
Iona †	6	–	3	.667	12	–	6	.667
Manhattan	6	–	12	.333	7	–	13	.350
Rider	5	–	13	.278	6	–	17	.261
† 2021 MAAC tournament winner Note: The MAAC has ordered standings based on league wins, not winning percentage, since all teams did not reach 20 conference games played. These standings were also used for seeding purposes in the 2021 MAAC tournament.

The 2020–21 Quinnipiac Bobcats men's basketball team represented Quinnipiac University in the 2020–21 NCAA Division I men's basketball season. The Bobcats, led by fourth-year head coach Baker Dunleavy, played their home games at People's United Center in Hamden, Connecticut as members of the Metro Atlantic Athletic Conference. In a season limited due to the ongoing COVID-19 pandemic, they finished the season 9–13, 7–10 in MAAC play to finish in a tie for fifth place. As the No. 8 seed in the MAAC tournament, they lost in the first round to Iona.

== Previous season ==
The Bobcats finished the 2019–20 season 15–15, 10–10 in MAAC play to finish in fifth place. Before they could face Monmouth in the MAAC tournament quarterfinals, all postseason tournaments were canceled amid the COVID-19 pandemic.

== Roster ==
2020–21 Quinnipiac Bobcats men's basketball team
Players
Coaches

Pos.	#	Name	Height	Weight	Year	Previous school	Hometown
G	0	Bol Akot	6 ft 2 in (1.88 m)	165 lb (75 kg)	Fr	Proctor Academy	Manchester, New Hampshire
G/F	1	Tymu Chenery	6 ft 6 in (1.98 m)	170 lb (77 kg)	Fr	Episcopal High School	Philadelphia, Pennsylvania
G	2	Matt Balanc	6 ft 3 in (1.91 m)	175 lb (79 kg)	RS So	Springbrook High School	Silver Spring, Maryland
G	3	Savion Lewis	6 ft 1 in (1.85 m)	160 lb (73 kg)	RS So	Half Hollow Hills High School East	Dix Hills, New York
C	4	Seth Pinkney	7 ft 1 in (2.16 m)	200 lb (91 kg)	So	Montverde Academy	Warminster, Pennsylvania
G	5	Tyrese Williams	6 ft 3 in (1.91 m)	185 lb (84 kg)	Jr	Cardinal Hayes High School	Beacon, New York
G	10	Tyree Pickron	6 ft 3 in (1.91 m)	180 lb (82 kg)	Jr	Archbishop Wood Catholic High School	Philadelphia, Pennsylvania
G	11	Brendan Martin	5 ft 7 in (1.7 m)	150 lb (68 kg)	Jr	Ward Melville High School	South Setauket, New York
G	15	Luis Kortright	6 ft 3 in (1.91 m)	180 lb (82 kg)	Fr	St. Raymond High School	Manhattan, New York
G/F	20	Brendan McGuire	6 ft 7 in (2.01 m)	190 lb (86 kg)	So	St. Thomas More School	Garden City, New York
F	22	Elias King	6 ft 9 in (2.06 m)	185 lb (84 kg)	So	Santa Monica College	Sacramento, California
F	23	JJ Riggins	6 ft 6 in (1.98 m)	190 lb (86 kg)	RS Fr	Imhotep High School	Philadelphia, Pennsylvania
F	25	Jacob Rigoni	6 ft 6 in (1.98 m)	190 lb (86 kg)	Sr	Mercedes College	Adelaide, Australia
G	32	Jack Higgins	6 ft 1 in (1.85 m)	170 lb (77 kg)	RS Jr	Rumson-Fair Haven High School	Rumson, New Jersey

Head coach

- Baker Dunleavy (Villanova)

Assistant coach(es)

- Tom Pecora (Adelphi)
- Shaun Morris (Lycoming)
- Dwayne Lee (Saint Joseph's)

Legend

- (C) Team captain
- (S) Suspended
- (I) Ineligible
- (W) Walk-on
- Injured
- Current redshirt

Roster
Last update: January 24, 2021

== Schedule and results ==
Date time, TV	Rank^{#}	Opponent^{#}	Result	Record	Site (attendance) city, state
Non-conference regular season
November 25, 2020*; 4:30 pm, ESPN3		Fairleigh Dickinson	W 84–66	1–0	People's United Center; Hamden, CT
December 2, 2020*; 7:30 pm, FloHoops		vs. Drexel; Hall of Fame Tip Off	L 48–66	1–1	Mohegan Sun Arena; Uncasville, CT
December 3, 2020*; 2:00 pm, FloHoops		vs. Drexel; Hall of Fame Tip Off	L 58–70	1–2	Mohegan Sun Arena; Uncasville, CT
December 6, 2020*; 2:00 pm, ESPN+		New Hampshire	W 64–58	2–2	People's United Center; Hamden, CT
MAAC regular season
January 8, 2021; 4:00 pm, ESPN+		Manhattan	W 84–79 ^{2OT}	3–2 (1–0)	People's United Center; Hamden, CT
January 9, 2021; 4:00 pm, ESPN3		Manhattan	L 42–45	3–3 (1–1)	People's United Center; Hamden, CT
January 15, 2021; 5:00 pm, ESPN3		at Monmouth	L 80–92 ^{OT}	3–4 (1–2)	OceanFirst Bank Center; West Long Branch, NJ
January 16, 2021; 5:00 pm, ESPN+		at Monmouth	L 63–70	3–5 (1–3)	OceanFirst Bank Center; West Long Branch, NJ
January 22, 2021; 4:00 pm, ESPN+		Niagara	L 56–59	3–6 (1–4)	People's United Center; Hamden, CT
January 23, 2021; 4:00 pm, ESPN3		Niagara	W 78–69	4–6 (2–4)	People's United Center; Hamden, CT
February 7, 2021; 2:00 pm, ESPN3		at Fairfield	W 78–63	5–6 (3–4)	Alumni Hall; Fairfield, CT
February 8, 2021; 2:00 pm, ESPN+		at Fairfield	L 70–77	5–7 (3–5)	Alumni Hall; Fairfield, CT
February 12, 2021; 1:00 pm, ESPN3		Canisius	L 67–74	5–8 (3–6)	People's United Center; Hamden, CT
February 13, 2021; 1:00 pm, ESPN3		Canisius	L 70–89	5–9 (3–7)	People's United Center; Hamden, CT
February 17, 2021; 4:00 pm, ESPN+		Iona	W 74–70	6–9 (4–7)	People's United Center; Hamden, CT
February 20, 2021; 4:00 pm, ESPN+		Rider	W 80–64	7–9 (5–7)	People's United Center; Hamden, CT
February 21, 2021; 4:00 pm, ESPN3		Rider	W 93–68	8–9 (6–7)	People's United Center; Hamden, CT
February 28, 2021; 4:00 pm, ESPN3		at Marist	L 67–76	8–10 (6–8)	McCann Arena; Poughkeepsie, NY
March 1, 2021; 4:00 pm, ESPN+		at Marist	L 52–65	8–11 (6–9)	McCann Arena; Poughkeepsie, NY
March 4, 2021; 4:00 pm, ESPN+		at Saint Peter's	W 65–60	9–11 (7–9)	People's United Center; Hamden, CT
March 5, 2021; 4:00 pm, ESPN3		at Saint Peter's	L 64–66	9–12 (7–10)	People's United Center; Hamden, CT
MAAC tournament
March 9, 2021; 5:00 pm, ESPN+	(8)	vs. (9) Iona; First round	L 48–72	9–13	Boardwalk Hall; Atlantic City, NJ
*Non-conference game. ^{#}Rankings from AP Poll. (#) Tournament seedings in parentheses. All times are in Eastern.
