= 2020–21 Niagara Purple Eagles men's basketball team =

American college basketball season

2020–21 Niagara Purple Eagles men's basketball
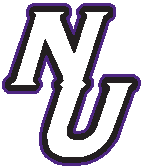
- Conference: Metro Atlantic Athletic Conference
- Record: 9–11 (7–9 MAAC)
- Head coach: Greg Paulus (2nd season)
- Assistant coaches: Bryan Smothers; Brett Ervin; Kevin Devitt
- Home arena: Gallagher Center

2020–21 MAAC men's basketball standings
	Conf.				Overall
Team	W		L	PCT	W		L	PCT
Siena	12	–	4	.750	12	–	5	.706
Monmouth	12	–	6	.667	12	–	8	.600
Saint Peter's	10	–	8	.556	14	–	11	.560
Marist	10	–	8	.556	12	–	9	.571
Niagara	7	–	9	.438	9	–	11	.450
Canisius	7	–	5	.583	7	–	6	.538
Fairfield	7	–	11	.389	10	–	17	.370
Quinnipiac	7	–	10	.412	9	–	13	.409
Iona †	6	–	3	.667	12	–	6	.667
Manhattan	6	–	12	.333	7	–	13	.350
Rider	5	–	13	.278	6	–	17	.261
† 2021 MAAC tournament winner Note: The MAAC has ordered standings based on league wins, not winning percentage, since all teams did not reach 20 conference games played. These standings were also used for seeding purposes in the 2021 MAAC tournament.

The 2020–21 Niagara Purple Eagles men's basketball team represented Niagara University in the 2020–21 NCAA Division I men's basketball season. The Purple Eagles, led by second-year head coach Greg Paulus, played their home games at the Gallagher Center in Lewiston, New York as members of the Metro Atlantic Athletic Conference (MAAC). They finished the season 9–11, 7–9 in MAAC play, to finish in a four-way tie for fifth place. As the No. 5 seed in the MAAC tournament, they defeated No. 4 seed Marist in the quarterfinals, but lost to No. 9 seed Iona 64–70 in the semifinals.

== Previous season ==
The Purple Eagles finished the 2019–20 season 12–20 overall, 9–11 in MAAC play, to finish in a tie for sixth place. As the #6 seed in the MAAC tournament, they defeated #11 seed Marist 56–54 in the first round. Before they could face #3 seeded Rider in the MAAC tournament quarterfinals, all postseason tournaments were cancelled amid the COVID-19 pandemic.

== Roster ==
2020–21 Niagara Purple Eagles men's basketball team
Players
Coaches

Pos.	#	Name	Height	Weight	Year	Previous school	Hometown
G	0	Justin Roberts	5 ft 10 in (1.78 m)	189 lb (86 kg)	RS Sr	Toledo	Lawrence, KS
F	1	Kobi Nwandu	6 ft 6 in (1.98 m)	210 lb (95 kg)	RS Sr	Le Moyne	York, PA
G	4	Tahjae Hill	6 ft 2 in (1.88 m)	180 lb (82 kg)	Fr	Hilton High School	Hilton, NY
G	10	Marcus Hammond	6 ft 2 in (1.88 m)	160 lb (73 kg)	Jr	Cardozo High School	Queens, NY
G	11	Raheem Solomon	6 ft 3 in (1.91 m)	180 lb (82 kg)	Jr	Sacred Heart High School	Hartford, CT
G	12	Shandon Brown	5 ft 9 in (1.75 m)	175 lb (79 kg)	Jr	George Washington	Boston, MA
F	13	Touba Traore	6 ft 11 in (2.11 m)	210 lb (95 kg)	Fr	Massanutten Military Academy	Bamako, Mali
F	15	Greg Kuakumensah	6 ft 6 in (1.98 m)	200 lb (91 kg)	Sr	Cushing Academy	Worcester, MA
F	20	Jordan Cintron	6 ft 8 in (2.03 m)	220 lb (100 kg)	Sr	Longwood	The Bronx, NY
G/F	22	Nick MacDonald	6 ft 5 in (1.96 m)	185 lb (84 kg)	So	St. Thomas More School	Amherst, NY
G	24	Trey Syroka	5 ft 10 in (1.78 m)	150 lb (68 kg)	So	Whitmer High School	Toledo, OH
F	32	Will Engelhardt	6 ft 7 in (2.01 m)	205 lb (93 kg)	So	Kimball Union Academy	Syracuse, NY
G	33	Steven Levnaic	6 ft 2 in (1.88 m)	180 lb (82 kg)	RS So	RISE Centre Academy	Hamilton, ON
F	34	Nicholas Kratholm	6 ft 9 in (2.06 m)	220 lb (100 kg)	Sr	Miami Dade College	Louisville, KY

Head coach

- Greg Paulus (Duke)

Assistant coach(es)

- Bryan Smothers (Wayne State)
- Brett Ervin (West Virginia Wesleyan)
- Kevin Devitt (DePaul)

Legend

- (C) Team captain
- (S) Suspended
- (I) Ineligible
- (W) Walk-on
- Injured
- Current redshirt

Roster
Last update: January 15, 2021

== Schedule and results ==
Date time, TV	Rank^{#}	Opponent^{#}	Result	Record	Site (attendance) city, state
Regular season
December 3, 2020*; 8:00 p.m., ACCRSN		at Syracuse	L 45–75	0–1	Carrier Dome; Syracuse, NY
December 11, 2020; 8:00 p.m., ESPN3		at Saint Peter's	L 54–70	0–2 (0–1)	John J. Moore Athletics Center; Jersey City, NJ
December 12, 2020; 8:00 p.m., ESPN3		at Saint Peter's	L 49–53	0–3 (0–2)	John J. Moore Athletics Center; Jersey City, NJ
December 18, 2020; 4:00 p.m., ESPN3		Fairfield	W 68–51	1–3 (1–2)	Gallagher Center; Lewiston, NY
December 19, 2020; 4:00 p.m., ESPN3		Fairfield	W 81–61	2–3 (2–2)	Gallagher Center; Lewiston, NY
December 22, 2020*; 3:00 p.m., ESPN+		at Albany	W 70–65	3–3	SEFCU Arena; Albany, NY
January 1, 2021; 2:00 p.m., ESPN+		at Marist	L 61–63	3–4 (2–3)	McCann Arena; Poughkeepsie, NY
January 2, 2021; 2:00 p.m., ESPN3		at Marist	W 86–72	4–4 (3–3)	McCann Arena; Poughkeepsie, NY
January 8, 2021; 4:00 p.m., ESPN+		Rider	L 70–76	4–5 (3–4)	Gallagher Center; Lewiston, NY
January 9, 2021; 4:00 p.m., ESPN3		Rider	W 66–55	5–5 (4–4)	Gallagher Center; Lewiston, NY
January 15, 2021; 4:00 p.m., ESPN3		at Manhattan	L 49–58	5–6 (4–5)	Draddy Gymnasium; Riverdale, NY
January 16, 2021; 4:00 p.m., ESPN+		at Manhattan	L 55–58	5–7 (4–6)	Draddy Gymnasium; Riverdale, NY
January 22, 2021; 4:00 p.m., ESPN3		at Quinnipiac	W 59–56	6–7 (5–6)	People's United Center; Hamden, CT
January 23, 2021; 4:00 p.m., ESPN+		at Quinnipiac	L 69–78	6–8 (5–7)	People's United Center; Hamden, CT
January 29, 2021; 4:00 p.m.		Monmouth	L 67–77	6–9 (5–8)	Gallagher Center; Lewiston, NY
January 30, 2021; 4:00 p.m.		Monmouth	W 83–74	7–9 (6–8)	Gallagher Center; Lewiston, NY
February 20, 2021; 12:00 p.m., ESPN+		Siena	W 64–62	8–9 (7–8)	Gallagher Center; Lewiston, NY
February 21, 2021; 12:00 p.m., ESPN3		Siena	L 66–68	8–10 (7–9)	Gallagher Center; Lewiston, NY
February 26, 2021		Canisius	Canceled due to COVID-19 issues		Gallagher Center; Lewiston, NY
February 27, 2021		Canisius	Canceled due to COVID-19 issues		Gallagher Center; Lewiston, NY
MAAC tournament
March 11, 2021; 7:30 p.m., ESPN+	(5)	vs. (4) Marist; Quarterfinals	W 67–62	9–10	Boardwalk Hall; Atlantic City, NJ
March 12, 2021; 5:30 p.m., ESPNews	(5)	vs. (9) Iona; Semifinals	L 64–70	9–11	Boardwalk Hall; Atlantic City, NJ
*Non-conference game. ^{#}Rankings from AP poll. (#) Tournament seedings in parentheses. All times are in Eastern.
