= 2020–21 Iona Gaels men's basketball team =

American college basketball season

2020–21 Iona Gaels men's basketball
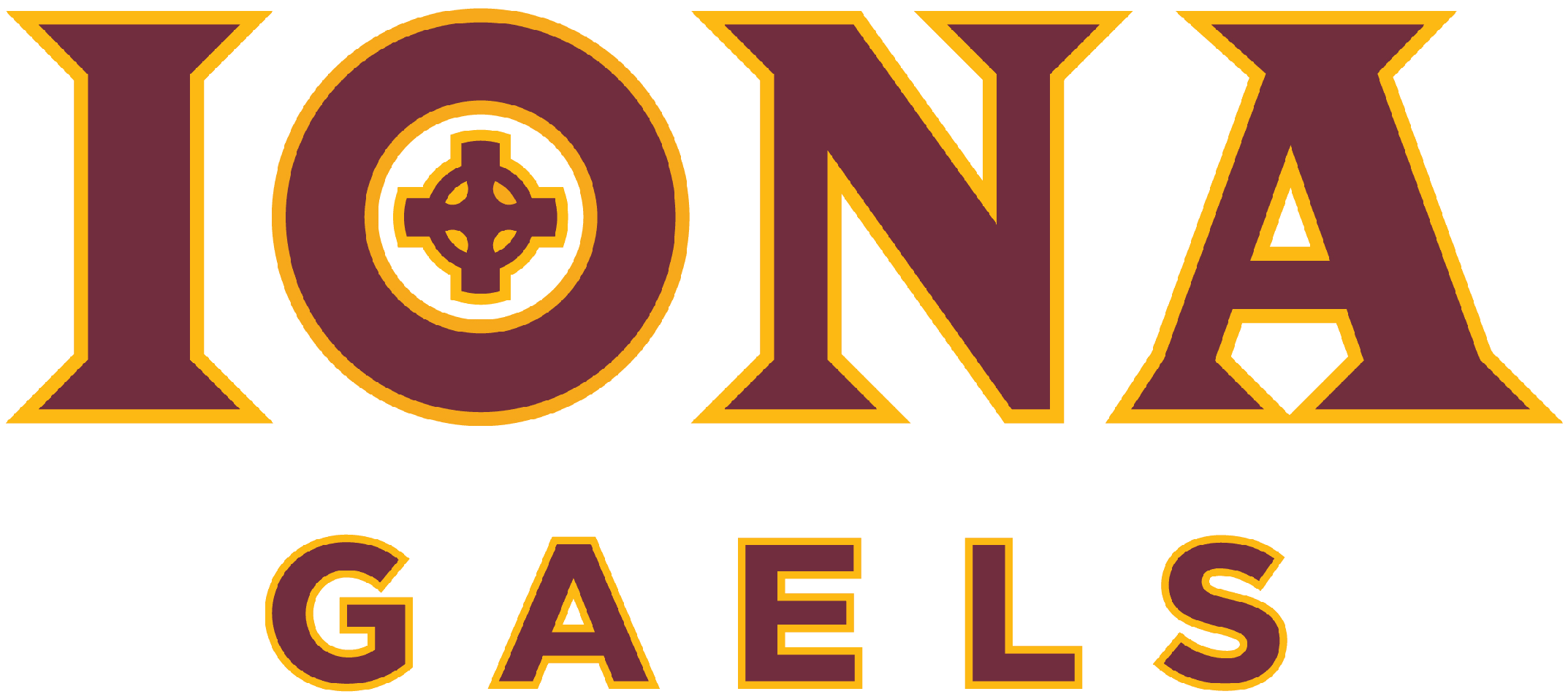

MAAC tournament champions

NCAA tournament, First Round
- Conference: Metro Atlantic Athletic Conference
- Record: 12–6 (6–3 MAAC)
- Head coach: Rick Pitino (1st season)
- Assistant coaches: Tom Abatemarco; Casey Stanley; Ricky Johns
- Home arena: Hynes Athletic Center

2020–21 MAAC men's basketball standings
	Conf.				Overall
Team	W		L	PCT	W		L	PCT
Siena	12	–	4	.750	12	–	5	.706
Monmouth	12	–	6	.667	12	–	8	.600
Saint Peter's	10	–	8	.556	14	–	11	.560
Marist	10	–	8	.556	12	–	9	.571
Niagara	7	–	9	.438	9	–	11	.450
Canisius	7	–	5	.583	7	–	6	.538
Fairfield	7	–	11	.389	10	–	17	.370
Quinnipiac	7	–	10	.412	9	–	13	.409
Iona †	6	–	3	.667	12	–	6	.667
Manhattan	6	–	12	.333	7	–	13	.350
Rider	5	–	13	.278	6	–	17	.261
† 2021 MAAC tournament winner Note: The MAAC has ordered standings based on league wins, not winning percentage, since all teams did not reach 20 conference games played. These standings were also used for seeding purposes in the 2021 MAAC tournament.

The 2020–21 Iona Gaels men's basketball team represented Iona College in the 2020–21 NCAA Division I men's basketball season. The Gaels, led by first-year head coach Rick Pitino, played their home games at the Hynes Athletic Center in New Rochelle, New York as members of the Metro Atlantic Athletic Conference. In a season limited due to the ongoing COVID-19 pandemic, they finished the season 12–6, 6–3 in MAAC play to finish in a tie for ninth place. As the No. 9 seed in the MAAC tournament, they defeated Quinnipiac, Siena, and Niagara to advance to the tournament championship game. They defeated Fairfield to win the tournament championship and earned the conference's automatic bid to the NCAA tournament. They received a No. 15 seed in the East region and lost in the first round to No. 2 seed Alabama 68–55.

The Gaels marked the fifth team Pitino had taken to the NCAA Tournament, tying him with Lon Kruger and Tubby Smith, for the record for most teams taken to the tournament.

== Previous season ==
The Gaels finished the 2019–20 season 12–17, 9–11 in MAAC play to finish in a tie for sixth place. As the No. 7 seed in the MAAC tournament, they defeated Canisius, before losing to Saint Peter's in the quarterfinals.

Following the season, head coach Tim Cluess stepped down as head coach of the Gaels due to health concerns. A day later, the school named Hall of Fame coach Rick Pitino the Gaels' new head coach.

== Roster ==
2020–21 Iona Gaels men's basketball team
Players
Coaches

Pos.	#	Name	Height	Weight	Year	Previous school	Hometown
G	0	Berrick JeanLouis	6 ft 4 in (1.93 m)	195 lb (88 kg)	Jr	Florida SouthWestern State	Lehigh Acres, Florida
G	1	Colton Cashaw	6 ft 2 in (1.88 m)	185 lb (84 kg)	Sr	Spartanburg Methodist College	Charlotte, North Carolina
G	2	Asante Gist	5 ft 10 in (1.78 m)	185 lb (84 kg)	Sr	Eastern Kentucky	East Orange, New Jersey
G	3	Ryan Myers	6 ft 0 in (1.83 m)	170 lb (77 kg)	Fr	Christ the King High School	Brooklyn, New York
G	4	Parker Weiss	6 ft 2 in (1.88 m)	175 lb (79 kg)	So	Community School of Naples	Naples, Florida
G	5	Tahlik Chavez	6 ft 1 in (1.85 m)	160 lb (73 kg)	So	Garden City Community College	Arlington, Texas
F	11	Dwayne Koroma	6 ft 7 in (2.01 m)	190 lb (86 kg)	Fr	Bishop Walsh School	Berlin, Germany
F	12	Jordan Brooks	6 ft 4 in (1.93 m)	190 lb (86 kg)	Fr	Bosco Institute	Grayson, Kentucky
G	13	Omar Rowe	6 ft 5 in (1.96 m)	185 lb (84 kg)	Fr	TaylorMade Academy	Queens, New York
F	15	Johan Crafoord	6 ft 8 in (2.03 m)	230 lb (104 kg)	Fr	Glove Prep Christian Academy	Stockholm, Sweden
G	20	Isaiah Ross	6 ft 3 in (1.91 m)	200 lb (91 kg)	Sr	UMKC	Davenport, Iowa
F	23	Nelly Junior Joseph	6 ft 9 in (2.06 m)	230 lb (104 kg)	Fr	NBA Academy Africa	Benin City, Nigeria
F	24	Dylan van Eyck	6 ft 8 in (2.03 m)	210 lb (95 kg)	Sr	Northeastern Oklahoma A&M	Boskoop, Netherlands
G	44	James Carey	5 ft 10 in (1.78 m)	160 lb (73 kg)	So	Gettysburg College	Pelham, New York
F	50	Trey James	6 ft 10 in (2.08 m)	240 lb (109 kg)	Fr	Martin County High School	Inez, Kentucky
F	55	Osborn Shema	7 ft 0 in (2.13 m)	200 lb (91 kg)	So	New Mexico Military Institute	Kanombe, Rwanda

Head coach

- Rick Pitino (UMass)

Assistant coach(es)

- Tom Abatemarco (Dowling)
- Casey Stanley (Iona)
- Ricky Johns (Monroe)

Legend

- (C) Team captain
- (S) Suspended
- (I) Ineligible
- (W) Walk-on
- Injured
- Current redshirt

Roster
Last update: January 30, 2021

== Schedule and results ==
On February 22, 2021, the Iona men's basketball team was placed on another COVID-19 pause due to a player testing positive for the virus the previous day. The school effectively canceled their remaining five conference games, but participated in the MAAC Tournament.

Date time, TV	Rank^{#}	Opponent^{#}	Result	Record	Site (attendance) city, state
Regular season
November 30, 2020*; 9:00 pm, FS1		at Seton Hall	L 64–86	0–1	Prudential Center; Newark, NJ
December 5, 2020*; 4:00 pm, FloSports		at Hofstra	W 82–74	1–1	Mack Sports Complex; Hempstead, NY
December 8, 2020*; 3:00 pm, ESPN3		Morgan State	L 72–83	1–2	Hynes Athletic Center; New Rochelle, NY
December 11, 2020; 7:00 pm, ESPNU		at Fairfield	W 70–42	2–2 (1–0)	Alumni Hall; Fairfield, CT
December 12, 2020; 7:00 pm, ESPN+		at Fairfield	L 52–67	2–3 (1–1)	Alumni Hall; Fairfield, CT
December 18, 2020; 7:00 pm, ESPN+		at Rider	W 70–56	3–3 (2–1)	Alumni Gymnasium; Lawrenceville, NJ
December 19, 2020; 7:00 pm, ESPN+		at Rider	W 72–64	4–3 (3–1)	Alumni Gymnasium; Lawrenceville, NJ
December 23, 2020*; 7:00 pm, ESPN+		Coppin State	W 85–65	5–3	Hynes Athletic Center; New Rochelle, NY
February 12, 2021; 5:00 pm, ESPN+		Manhattan	W 85–67	6–3 (4–1)	Hynes Athletic Center; New Rochelle, NY
February 13, 2021; 5:00 pm, ESPN+		Manhattan	L 70–77	6–4 (4–2)	Hynes Athletic Center; New Rochelle, NY
February 17, 2021; 4:00 pm, ESPN+		at Quinnipiac	L 70–74	6–5 (4–3)	People's United Center; Hamden, CT
February 19, 2021; 6:00 pm, ESPNU		Monmouth	W 91–86	7–5 (5–3)	Hynes Athletic Center; New Rochelle, NY
February 20, 2021; 6:00 pm, ESPN+		Monmouth	W 88–65	8–5 (6–3)	Hynes Athletic Center; New Rochelle, NY
February 24, 2021; 5:00 pm		at Marist	Cancelled due to COVID-19 issues		McCann Arena; Poughkeepsie, NY
February 27, 2021; 2:00 pm		Siena	Cancelled due to COVID-19 issues		Hynes Athletic Center; New Rochelle, NY
February 28, 2021; 6:00 pm		Siena	Cancelled due to COVID-19 issues		Hynes Athletic Center; New Rochelle, NY
March 4, 2021; 4:00 pm		Saint Peter's	Cancelled due to COVID-19 issues		Hynes Athletic Center; New Rochelle, NY
March 5, 2021; 4:00 pm		Saint Peter's	Cancelled due to COVID-19 issues		Hynes Athletic Center; New Rochelle, NY
MAAC tournament
March 9, 2021; 5:00 pm, ESPN+	(9)	vs. (8) Quinnipiac; First round	W 72–48	9–5	Boardwalk Hall; Atlantic City, NJ
March 10, 2021; 5:00 pm, ESPN+	(9)	vs. (1) Siena; Quarterfinals	W 55–52	10–5	Boardwalk Hall; Atlantic City, NJ
March 12, 2021; 5:30 pm, ESPNews	(9)	vs. (5) Niagara; Semifinals	W 70–64	11–5	Boardwalk Hall; Atlantic City, NJ
March 13, 2021; 4:00 pm, ESPNU	(9)	vs. (7) Fairfield; Championship	W 60–51	12–5	Boardwalk Hall; Atlantic City, NJ
NCAA tournament
March 20, 2021; 4:00 pm, TBS	(15 E)	vs. (2 E) No. 5 Alabama; First Round	L 55–68	12–6	Hinkle Fieldhouse; Indianapolis, IN
*Non-conference game. ^{#}Rankings from AP Poll. (#) Tournament seedings in parentheses. All times are in Eastern.
