= 2020–21 Manhattan Jaspers basketball team =

American college basketball season

2020–21 Manhattan Jaspers basketball
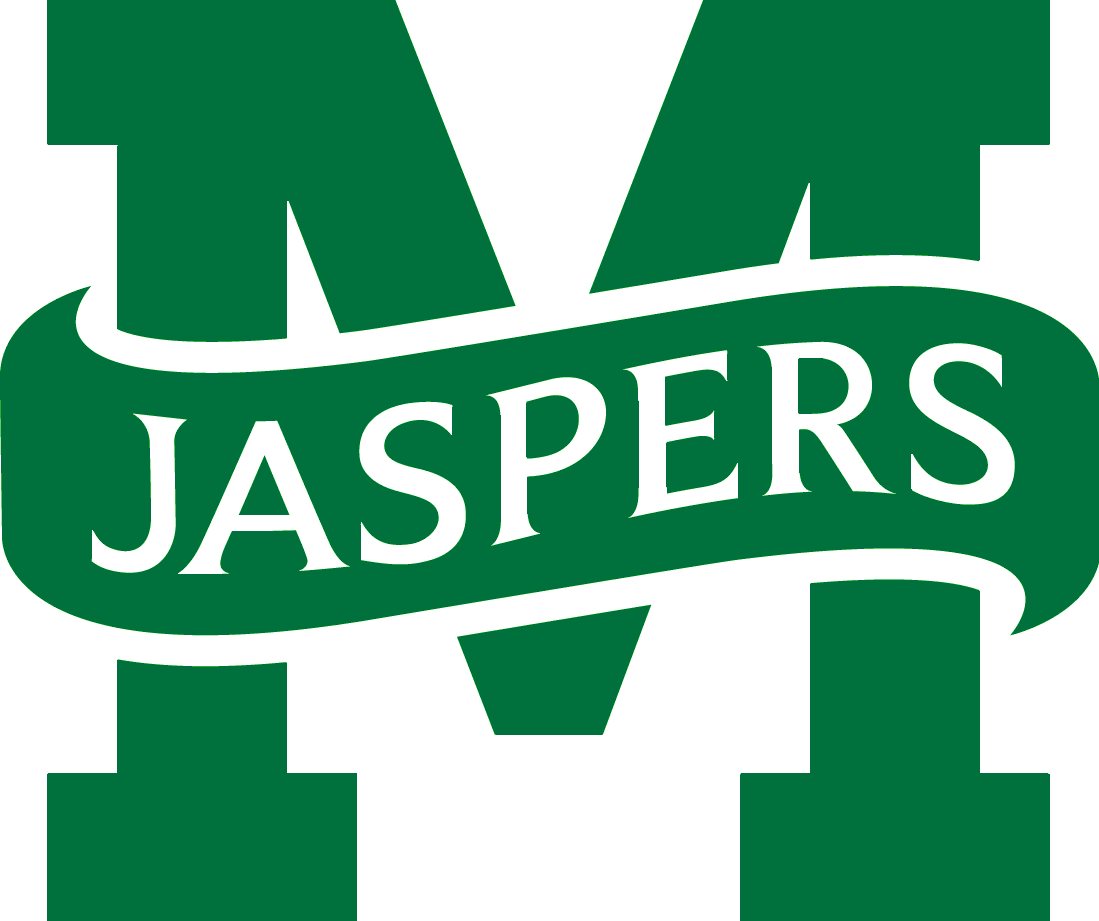
- Conference: Metro Atlantic Athletic Conference
- Record: 7–13 (6–12 MAAC)
- Head coach: Steve Masiello (10th season)
- Associate head coach: Matt Grady
- Assistant coaches: RaShawn Stores; Doug Thibault
- Home arena: Draddy Gymnasium

2020–21 MAAC men's basketball standings
| | Conf. | | | | Overall |
| Team | W | | L | PCT | W | | L | PCT |
|---|---|---|---|---|---|---|---|---|
| Siena | 12 | – | 4 | .750 | 12 | – | 5 | .706 |
| Monmouth | 12 | – | 6 | .667 | 12 | – | 8 | .600 |
| Saint Peter's | 10 | – | 8 | .556 | 14 | – | 11 | .560 |
| Marist | 10 | – | 8 | .556 | 12 | – | 9 | .571 |
| Niagara | 7 | – | 9 | .438 | 9 | – | 11 | .450 |
| Canisius | 7 | – | 5 | .583 | 7 | – | 6 | .538 |
| Fairfield | 7 | – | 11 | .389 | 10 | – | 17 | .370 |
| Quinnipiac | 7 | – | 10 | .412 | 9 | – | 13 | .409 |
| Iona † | 6 | – | 3 | .667 | 12 | – | 6 | .667 |
| Manhattan | 6 | – | 12 | .333 | 7 | – | 13 | .350 |
| Rider | 5 | – | 13 | .278 | 6 | – | 17 | .261 |
† 2021 MAAC tournament winner Note: The MAAC has ordered standings based on league wins, not winning percentage, since all teams did not reach 20 conference games played. These standings were also used for seeding purposes in the 2021 MAAC tournament.

The 2020–21 Manhattan Jaspers basketball team represented Manhattan College in the 2020–21 NCAA Division I men's basketball season. The Jaspers, led by tenth-year head coach Steve Masiello, played their home games at Draddy Gymnasium in Riverdale, New York as members of the Metro Atlantic Athletic Conference (MAAC). They finished the season 7–13, 6–12 in MAAC play, to finish in a tie for ninth place. As the No. 10 seed in the MAAC tournament, they lost in the first round to No. 7 seed Fairfield 58–59 in overtime.

== Previous season ==
The Jaspers finished the 2019–20 season 13–18 overall, 8–12 in MAAC play, to finish in a tie for eighth place. As the #9 seed in the MAAC tournament, they defeated #8 seed Fairfield 61–43 in the first round before losing to #1 seed Siena 49–63 in the quarterfinals.

== Roster ==
2020–21 Manhattan Jaspers men's basketball team
Players
Coaches

| Pos. | # | Name | Height | Weight | Year | Previous school | Hometown |
|---|---|---|---|---|---|---|---|
| F | 0 | Warren Williams | 6 ft 9 in (2.06 m) | 240 lb (109 kg) | Jr | St. Benedict's Prep | Kingston, Jamaica |
| G | 1 | Matthew Glassman | 6 ft 0 in (1.83 m) | 175 lb (79 kg) | Jr | New Hampton School | Bedford, NH |
| G | 2 | Romar Reid | 6 ft 2 in (1.88 m) | 175 lb (79 kg) | So | Woodstock Academy | New Rochelle, NY |
| G | 3 | Ant Nelson | 6 ft 4 in (1.93 m) | 180 lb (82 kg) | Jr | Seton Hall | New York City, NY |
| G | 4 | Samir Stewart | 6 ft 0 in (1.83 m) | 180 lb (82 kg) | Jr | American Heritage School | Fort Lauderdale, FL |
| F | 5 | Samba Diallo | 6 ft 7 in (2.01 m) | 195 lb (88 kg) | Jr | UMass | Rufisque, Senegal |
| G | 10 | Nehemiah Mack | 6 ft 1 in (1.85 m) | 190 lb (86 kg) | Sr | Massanutten Military Academy | Harrisburg, PA |
| F | 11 | Daniel Schreier | 6 ft 9 in (2.06 m) | 220 lb (100 kg) | So | Vermont Academy | Santa Monica, CA |
| G | 12 | Ethan Lasko | 6 ft 2 in (1.88 m) | 175 lb (79 kg) | Sr | Indiana | Hollywood, FL |
| G | 14 | Marques Watson | 6 ft 5 in (1.96 m) | 190 lb (86 kg) | Jr | Miami Dade College | Brooklyn, NY |
| F | 15 | Amir Britt | 6 ft 7 in (2.01 m) | 210 lb (95 kg) | Fr | Westtown School | Edison, NJ |
| G | 20 | Jason Douglas-Stanley | 6 ft 2 in (1.88 m) | 190 lb (86 kg) | Jr | George Mason | Mount Vernon, NY |
| G | 21 | Sean Duke | 6 ft 2 in (1.88 m) | 180 lb (82 kg) | Fr | St. Andrew's School | Providence, RI |
| F | 23 | Adam Cisse | 6 ft 10 in (2.08 m) | 220 lb (100 kg) | So | Cardinal Hayes High School | The Bronx, NY |
| F | 24 | Ebube Ebube | 6 ft 7 in (2.01 m) | 220 lb (100 kg) | Jr | Lawrenceville School | San Juan, Puerto Rico |
| G | 30 | Elijah Buchanan | 6 ft 5 in (1.96 m) | 190 lb (86 kg) | Jr | Woodstock Academy | The Bronx, NY |
| F | 32 | Kevin Salis | 6 ft 6 in (1.98 m) | 210 lb (95 kg) | Sr | Trinity-Pawling School | Cornwall, NY |
| G | 55 | Nick Brennen | 6 ft 5 in (1.96 m) | 180 lb (82 kg) | Jr | Harcum College | Irvington, NY |

Head coach

- Steve Masiello (Kentucky)

Assistant coach(es)

- Matt Grady (Saint Joseph's)
- RaShawn Stores (Manhattan)
- Doug Thibault (Boise State)

Legend

- (C) Team captain
- (S) Suspended
- (I) Ineligible
- (W) Walk-on
- Injured
- Current redshirt

Roster
Last update: January 15, 2021

== Schedule and results ==
| Date time, TV | Rank^{#} | Opponent^{#} | Result | Record | Site (attendance) city, state |
Regular season
| December 3, 2020*; 6:00 p.m. | | Fordham; Battle of the Bronx | Canceled due to COVID-19 | | Draddy Gymnasium; Riverdale, NY |
| December 11, 2020; 6:00 p.m., ESPN3 | | Rider | L 64–82 | 0–1 (0–1) | Draddy Gymnasium; Riverdale, NY |
| December 12, 2020; 6:00 p.m., ESPN3 | | Rider | W 87–77 | 1–1 (1–1) | Draddy Gymnasium; Riverdale, NY |
| December 19, 2020; 2:00 p.m., ESPN3 | | Marist | L 39–61 | 1–2 (1–2) | Draddy Gymnasium; Riverdale, NY |
| December 20, 2020; 2:00 p.m., ESPN3 | | Marist | L 67–72 ^{OT} | 1–3 (1–3) | Draddy Gymnasium; Riverdale, NY |
| December 30, 2020*; 1:00 p.m., YouTube | | at Delaware State | W 65–59 | 2–3 | Memorial Hall; Dover, DE |
| January 8, 2021; 4:00 p.m., ESPN+ | | at Quinnipiac | L 79–84 ^{2OT} | 2–4 (1–4) | People's United Center; Hamden, CT |
| January 9, 2021; 4:00 p.m., ESPN3 | | at Quinnipiac | W 45–42 | 3–4 (2–4) | People's United Center; Hamden, CT |
| January 15, 2021; 4:00 p.m., ESPN3 | | Niagara | W 58–49 | 4–4 (3–4) | Draddy Gymnasium; Riverdale, NY |
| January 16, 2021; 4:00 p.m., ESPN+ | | Niagara | W 58–55 | 5–4 (4–4) | Draddy Gymnasium; Riverdale, NY |
| January 29, 2021; 8:00 p.m., ESPN+ | | at Saint Peter's | L 55–59 | 5–5 (4–5) | John J. Moore Athletics Center; Jersey City, NJ |
| January 30, 2021; 8:00 p.m., ESPN3 | | at Saint Peter's | L 54–68 | 5–6 (4–6) | John J. Moore Athletics Center; Jersey City, NJ |
| February 5, 2021; 9:00 p.m., ESPNU | | Monmouth | L 65–70 | 5–7 (4–7) | Draddy Gymnasium; Riverdale, NY |
| February 6, 2021; 9:00 p.m., ESPN3 | | Monmouth | L 69–71 ^{OT} | 5–8 (4–8) | Draddy Gymnasium; Riverdale, NY |
| February 12, 2021; 6:00 p.m., ESPN+ | | at Iona | L 67–85 | 5–9 (4–9) | Hynes Athletic Center; New Rochelle, NY |
| February 13, 2021; 6:00 p.m., ESPN+ | | at Iona | W 77–70 | 6–9 (5–9) | Hynes Athletic Center; New Rochelle, NY |
| February 26, 2021; 7:00 p.m. | | at Siena | L 69–74 | 6–10 (5–10) | Alumni Recreation Center; Loudonville, NY |
| February 27, 2021; 7:00 p.m. | | at Siena | L 56–64 | 6–11 (5–11) | Alumni Recreation Center; Loudonville, NY |
| March 4, 2021; 6:00 p.m., ESPN+ | | Fairfield | W 69–59 | 7–11 (6–11) | Draddy Gymnasium; Riverdale, NY |
| March 5, 2021; 6:00 p.m., ESPN3 | | Fairfield | L 67–85 | 7–12 (6–12) | Draddy Gymnasium; Riverdale, NY |
MAAC tournament
| March 9, 2021; 7:30 p.m., ESPN+ | (10) | vs. (7) Fairfield; First round | L 58–59 ^{OT} | 7–13 | Boardwalk Hall; Atlantic City, NJ |
*Non-conference game. ^{#}Rankings from AP poll. (#) Tournament seedings in parentheses. All times are in Eastern.
