= 2020–21 Siena Saints men's basketball team =

American college basketball season

2020–21 Siena Saints men's basketball

MAAC regular season co-champions
- Conference: Metro Atlantic Athletic Conference
- Record: 12–5 (12–4 MAAC)
- Head coach: Carmen Maciariello (2nd season)
- Assistant coaches: Harley Fuller; Bob Simon; Antoni Wyche
- Home arena: Alumni Recreation Center

2020–21 MAAC men's basketball standings
| | Conf. | | | | Overall |
| Team | W | | L | PCT | W | | L | PCT |
|---|---|---|---|---|---|---|---|---|
| Siena | 12 | – | 4 | .750 | 12 | – | 5 | .706 |
| Monmouth | 12 | – | 6 | .667 | 12 | – | 8 | .600 |
| Saint Peter's | 10 | – | 8 | .556 | 14 | – | 11 | .560 |
| Marist | 10 | – | 8 | .556 | 12 | – | 9 | .571 |
| Niagara | 7 | – | 9 | .438 | 9 | – | 11 | .450 |
| Canisius | 7 | – | 5 | .583 | 7 | – | 6 | .538 |
| Fairfield | 7 | – | 11 | .389 | 10 | – | 17 | .370 |
| Quinnipiac | 7 | – | 10 | .412 | 9 | – | 13 | .409 |
| Iona † | 6 | – | 3 | .667 | 12 | – | 6 | .667 |
| Manhattan | 6 | – | 12 | .333 | 7 | – | 13 | .350 |
| Rider | 5 | – | 13 | .278 | 6 | – | 17 | .261 |
† 2021 MAAC tournament winner Note: The MAAC has ordered standings based on league wins, not winning percentage, since all teams did not reach 20 conference games played. These standings were also used for seeding purposes in the 2021 MAAC tournament.

The 2020–21 Siena Saints men's basketball team represented Siena College in the 2020–21 NCAA Division I men's basketball season. The Saints, led by second-year head coach Carmen Maciariello, played their home games at the Alumni Recreation Center in Loudonville, New York as members of the Metro Atlantic Athletic Conference. They finished the season 12–5, 12–4 in MAAC play to finish in a tie for first place. As the No. 1 seed in the MAAC tournament, they were upset in the quarterfinals by No. 9 seed Iona 52–55.

== Previous season ==
The Saints finished the 2019–20 season 20–10 overall, 15–5 in MAAC play to finish in first place. As the No. 1 seed in the MAAC tournament, they defeated No. 9 seed Manhattan 63–49 in the quarterfinals. However, the semifinals and championship game, and all postseason tournaments, were cancelled amid the COVID-19 pandemic.

== Roster ==
2020–21 Siena Saints men's basketball team
Players
Coaches

| Pos. | # | Name | Height | Weight | Year | Hometown |
|---|---|---|---|---|---|---|
| G | 0 | Nick Hopkins | 6 ft 0 in (1.83 m) | 174 lb (79 kg) | RS Sr | Fayetteville, Tennessee |
| F | 1 | Colin Golson, Jr. | 6 ft 7 in (2.01 m) | 222 lb (101 kg) | Fr | Detroit, Michigan |
| G/F | 3 | Manny Camper | 6 ft 7 in (2.01 m) | 216 lb (98 kg) | Sr | Chestertown, Maryland |
| F | 11 | Bennett Kwiecinski | 6 ft 8 in (2.03 m) | 185 lb (84 kg) | Fr | Wilmette, Illinois |
| F | 12 | Kyle Young | 6 ft 9 in (2.06 m) | 240 lb (109 kg) | So | Bethlehem, Pennsylvania |
| G | 14 | Jordan King | 6 ft 0 in (1.83 m) | 175 lb (79 kg) | So | Albany, New York |
| G | 15 | Robert Mahala | 6 ft 5 in (1.96 m) | 170 lb (77 kg) | Jr | Jackson, New Jersey |
| F | 20 | Denzel Tchougang | 6 ft 10 in (2.08 m) | 229 lb (104 kg) | RS Sr | Geneva, Switzerland |
| G | 22 | Jalen Pickett | 6 ft 4 in (1.93 m) | 202 lb (92 kg) | Jr | Rochester, New York |
| F | 24 | Harrison Curry | 6 ft 7 in (2.01 m) | 257 lb (117 kg) | RS Sr | Ann Arbor, Michigan |
| G | 25 | Aidan Carpenter | 6 ft 5 in (1.96 m) | 185 lb (84 kg) | Fr | Hamden, Connecticut |
| F | 33 | Steven Lazar | 6 ft 8 in (2.03 m) | 174 lb (79 kg) | Fr | Toronto, Canada |
| F | 42 | Kyle Arrington | 6 ft 10 in (2.08 m) | 262 lb (119 kg) | Sr | Council Bluffs, Iowa |
| F | 55 | Jackson Stormo | 6 ft 9 in (2.06 m) | 247 lb (112 kg) | Jr | Santa Barbara, California |

Head coach

- Carmen Maciariello (Siena)

Assistant coach(es)

- Harley Fuller (Molloy)
- Bob Simon (Eastern Michigan)
- Antoni Wyche (Notre Dame)

Legend

- (C) Team captain
- (S) Suspended
- (I) Ineligible
- (W) Walk-on
- Injured
- Current redshirt

Roster
Last update: November 15, 2020

== Schedule and results ==
| Date time, TV | Rank^{#} | Opponent^{#} | Result | Record | Site (attendance) city, state |
Regular season
| November 28, 2020* | | Delaware | Canceled due to COVID-19 | | Alumni Recreation Center; Loudonville, NY |
| November 30, 2020* | | at Liberty | Canceled due to COVID-19 | | |
| December 22, 2020*; 2:00 pm | | at Drexel | Canceled due to COVID-19 | | Daskalakis Athletic Center; Philadelphia, PA |
| December 29, 2020*; 2:00 pm | | Towson | Canceled due to COVID-19 | | Alumni Recreation Center; Loudonville, NY |
MAAC regular season
| January 3, 2021; 3:00 pm | | Monmouth | W 78–77 | 1–0 (1–0) | Alumni Recreation Center; Loudonville, NY |
| January 4, 2021; 5:00 pm | | Monmouth | W 76–62 | 2–0 (2–0) | Alumni Recreation Center; Loudonville, NY |
| January 9, 2021; 4:00 pm, ESPN+ | | at Fairfield | W 74–58 | 3–0 (3–0) | Alumni Hall; Fairfield, CT |
| January 10, 2021; 4:00 pm, ESPN3 | | at Fairfield | W 75–68 | 4–0 (4–0) | Alumni Hall; Fairfield, CT |
| January 15, 2021; 7:00 pm, ESPN+ | | at Rider | W 78–69 | 5–0 (5–0) | Alumni Gymnasium; Lawrenceville, NJ |
| January 16, 2021; 7:00 pm, ESPN3 | | at Rider | W 74–72 | 6–0 (6–0) | Alumni Gymnasium; Lawrenceville, NJ |
| January 22, 2021; 7:00 pm, ESPNU | | Saint Peter's | L 62–68 | 6–1 (6–1) | Alumni Recreation Center; Loudonville, NY |
| January 23, 2021; 7:00 pm, ESPN3 | | Saint Peter's | W 47–40 | 7–1 (7–1) | Alumni Recreation Center; Loudonville, NY |
| January 30, 2021; 1:00 pm, ESPN+ | | at Marist | L 54–55 | 7–2 (7–2) | McCann Arena; Poughkeepsie, NY |
| January 31, 2021; 3:00 pm, ESPN3 | | at Marist | W 63–50 | 8–2 (8–2) | McCann Arena; Poughkeepsie, NY |
| February 20, 2021; 12:00 pm, ESPN+ | | at Niagara | L 62–64 | 8–3 (8–3) | Gallagher Center; Lewiston, NY |
| February 21, 2021; 12:00 pm, ESPN3 | | at Niagara | W 68–66 | 9–3 (9–3) | Gallagher Center; Lewiston, NY |
| February 26, 2021; 7:00 pm | | Manhattan | W 74–69 | 10–3 (10–3) | Alumni Recreation Center; Loudonville, NY |
| February 27, 2021; 7:00 pm | | Manhattan | W 64–56 | 11–3 (11–3) | Alumni Recreation Center; Loudonville, NY |
| February 27, 2021; 2:00 pm | | at Iona | Cancelled due to COVID-19 issues | | Hynes Athletic Center; New Rochelle, NY |
| February 28, 2021; 2:00 pm | | at Iona | Cancelled due to COVID-19 issues | | Hynes Athletic Center; New Rochelle, NY |
| March 4, 2021; 7:00 pm, ESPN3 | | Canisius | W 73–66 | 12–3 (12–3) | Alumni Recreation Center; Loudonville, NY |
| March 5, 2021; 7:00 pm, ESPN3 | | Canisius | L 75–76 | 12–4 (12–4) | Alumni Recreation Center; Loudonville, NY |
MAAC tournament
| March 10, 2021; 5:00 pm, ESPN+ | (1) | vs. (9) Iona; Quarterfinals | L 52–55 | 12–5 | Boardwalk Hall; Atlantic City, NJ |
*Non-conference game. ^{#}Rankings from AP Poll. (#) Tournament seedings in parentheses. All times are in Eastern.
