= 2020–21 Saint Peter's Peacocks men's basketball team =

American college basketball season

2020–21 Saint Peter's Peacocks men's basketball
- Conference: Metro Atlantic Athletic Conference
- Record: 14–11 (10–8 MAAC)
- Head coach: Shaheen Holloway (3rd season)
- Assistant coaches: Ryan Whalen; Matt Eisele
- Home arena: John J. Moore Athletics Center

2020–21 MAAC men's basketball standings
	Conf.				Overall
Team	W		L	PCT	W		L	PCT
Siena	12	–	4	.750	12	–	5	.706
Monmouth	12	–	6	.667	12	–	8	.600
Saint Peter's	10	–	8	.556	14	–	11	.560
Marist	10	–	8	.556	12	–	9	.571
Niagara	7	–	9	.438	9	–	11	.450
Canisius	7	–	5	.583	7	–	6	.538
Fairfield	7	–	11	.389	10	–	17	.370
Quinnipiac	7	–	10	.412	9	–	13	.409
Iona †	6	–	3	.667	12	–	6	.667
Manhattan	6	–	12	.333	7	–	13	.350
Rider	5	–	13	.278	6	–	17	.261
† 2021 MAAC tournament winner Note: The MAAC has ordered standings based on league wins, not winning percentage, since all teams did not reach 20 conference games played. These standings were also used for seeding purposes in the 2021 MAAC tournament.

The 2020–21 Saint Peter's Peacocks men's basketball team represented Saint Peter's University in the 2020–21 NCAA Division I men's basketball season. The Peacocks were led by third-year head coach Shaheen Holloway. Due to renovations at their regular home arena, Yanitelli Center, they played their home games at John J. Moore Athletics Center, on the campus of New Jersey City University, as members of the Metro Atlantic Athletic Conference (MAAC). They finished the season 14–11, 10–8 in MAAC play, to finish in a tie for third place. As the No. 3 seed in the MAAC tournament, they defeated No. 11 seed Rider in the quarterfinals before losing to No. 7 seed Fairfield in the semifinals.

== Previous season ==
The Peacocks finished the 2019–20 season 18–12 overall, 14–6 in MAAC play, to finish in second place. As the No. 2 seed in the MAAC tournament, they defeated seventh-seeded Iona 56–54 in the quarterfinals. However, the semifinals and championship game, and all postseason tournaments, were cancelled amid the COVID-19 pandemic.

== Roster ==
2020–21 Saint Peter's Peacocks men's basketball team
Players
Coaches

Pos.	#	Name	Height	Weight	Year	Previous school	Hometown
G	2	Marty Silvera	6 ft 0 in (1.83 m)	190 lb (86 kg)	Fr	Putnam Science Academy	Worcester, MA
G	5	Daryl III Banks	6 ft 3 in (1.91 m)	165 lb (75 kg)	So	The Patrick School	Los Angeles, CA
F	10	Fousseyni Drame	6 ft 7 in (2.01 m)	192 lb (87 kg)	So	Our Savior New American School	Bamako, Mali
F	11	KC Ndefo	6 ft 7 in (2.01 m)	195 lb (88 kg)	Jr	Abraham Lincoln High School	Elmont, NY
G	12	Noah Kamba	6 ft 2 in (1.88 m)	180 lb (82 kg)	So	Murray State	Lynn, MA
F	14	Hassan Drame	6 ft 7 in (2.01 m)	190 lb (86 kg)	So	Our Savior New American School	Bamako, Mali
G	15	Matthew Lee	6 ft 0 in (1.83 m)	160 lb (73 kg)	So	Dohn Prep	San Juan, Puerto Rico
G	20	Tarojae Brake	6 ft 3 in (1.91 m)	185 lb (84 kg)	GS	Kutztown	Coatesville, PA
F	24	Oumar Diahame	6 ft 10 in (2.08 m)	225 lb (102 kg)	Fr	The Patrick School	Dakar, Senegal
G	25	Doug Edert	6 ft 2 in (1.88 m)	185 lb (84 kg)	So	Bergen Catholic High School	Nutley, NJ
F	30	Babacar Diallo	6 ft 6 in (1.98 m)	195 lb (88 kg)	Fr	The Patrick School	Dakar, Senegal

Head coach

- Shaheen Holloway (Seton Hall)

Assistant coach(es)

- Ryan Whalen (Saint Joseph's)
- Matt Eisele (Pittsburgh)

Legend

- (C) Team captain
- (S) Suspended
- (I) Ineligible
- (W) Walk-on
- Injured
- Current redshirt

Roster
Last update: January 13, 2021

== Schedule and results ==
Date time, TV	Rank^{#}	Opponent^{#}	Result	Record	Site (attendance) city, state
Regular season
November 25, 2020*; 7:00 p.m., FS2		at St. John's; The Lapchick Tournament	L 75–76	0–1	Carnesecca Arena; Queens, NY
November 27, 2020*; 4:00 p.m.		vs. La Salle; The Lapchick Tournament	W 62–51	1–1	Carnesecca Arena; Queens, NY
December 1, 2020*; 6:00 p.m.		Stony Brook	W 82–68	2–1	John J. Moore Athletics Center; Jersey City, NJ
December 4, 2020*; 3:00 p.m., BTN		at Maryland	L 57–90	2–2	Xfinity Center; College Park, MD
December 11, 2020; 8:00 p.m., ESPN3		Niagara	W 70–54	3–2 (1–0)	John J. Moore Athletics Center; Jersey City, NJ
December 12, 2020; 8:00 p.m., ESPN3		Niagara	W 53–49	4–2 (2–0)	John J. Moore Athletics Center; Jersey City, NJ
December 18, 2020; 5:00 p.m., ESPN3		at Monmouth	L 76–78	4–3 (2–1)	OceanFirst Bank Center; West Long Branch, NJ
December 19, 2020; 5:00 p.m., ESPN3		at Monmouth	W 78–76	5–3 (3–1)	OceanFirst Bank Center; West Long Branch, NJ
December 23, 2020*; 2:00 p.m., NEC Front Row		at St. Francis Brooklyn	W 70–64	6–3	Generoso Pope Athletic Complex; Brooklyn, NY
January 1, 2021; 1:00 p.m., ESPN+		at Canisius	L 58–70	6–4 (3–2)	Koessler Athletic Center; Buffalo, NY
January 2, 2021; 1:00 p.m., ESPN3		at Canisius	L 60–63	6–5 (3–3)	Koessler Athletic Center; Buffalo, NY
January 22, 2021; 7:00 p.m., ESPNU		at Siena	W 68–62	7–5 (4–3)	Alumni Recreation Center; Loudonville, NY
January 23, 2021; 7:00 p.m., ESPN3		at Siena	L 40–47	7–6 (4–4)	Alumni Recreation Center; Loudonville, NY
January 29, 2021; 8:00 p.m., ESPN+		Manhattan	W 59–55	8–6 (5–4)	John J. Moore Athletics Center; Jersey City, NJ
January 30, 2021; 8:00 p.m., ESPN3		Manhattan	W 68–54	9–6 (6–4)	John J. Moore Athletics Center; Jersey City, NJ
February 13, 2021; 8:30 p.m., ESPN+		Fairfield	L 50–55	9–7 (6–5)	John J. Moore Athletics Center; Jersey City, NJ
February 14, 2021; 8:00 p.m., ESPN+		Fairfield	W 66–49	10–7 (7–5)	John J. Moore Athletics Center; Jersey City, NJ
February 19, 2021; 8:00 p.m., ESPN+		Marist	W 59–54	11–7 (8–5)	John J. Moore Athletics Center; Jersey City, NJ
February 20, 2021; 8:00 p.m., ESPN3		Marist	L 50–51	11–8 (8–6)	John J. Moore Athletics Center; Jersey City, NJ
February 26, 2021; 8:00 p.m., ESPN+		Rider	W 66–52	12–8 (9–6)	John J. Moore Athletics Center; Jersey City, NJ
February 27, 2021; 8:00 p.m., ESPN3		Rider	L 65–78	12–9 (9–7)	John J. Moore Athletics Center; Jersey City, NJ
March 4, 2021; 4:00 p.m., ESPN+		at Quinnipiac	L 60–65	12–10 (9–8)	People's United Center; Hamden, CT
March 5, 2021; 4:00 p.m., ESPN3		at Quinnipiac	W 66–64	13–10 (10–8)	People's United Center; Hamden, CT
MAAC tournament
March 11, 2021; 5:00 p.m., ESPN+	(3)	vs. (11) Rider; Quarterfinals	W 75–60	14–10	Boardwalk Hall; Atlantic City, NJ
March 12, 2021; 8:00 p.m., ESPNU	(3)	vs. (7) Fairfield; Semifinals	L 47–52	14–11	Boardwalk Hall; Atlantic City, NJ
*Non-conference game. ^{#}Rankings from AP poll. (#) Tournament seedings in parentheses. All times are in Eastern.
