= 2020–21 Marist Red Foxes men's basketball team =

American college basketball season

2020–21 Marist Red Foxes men's basketball
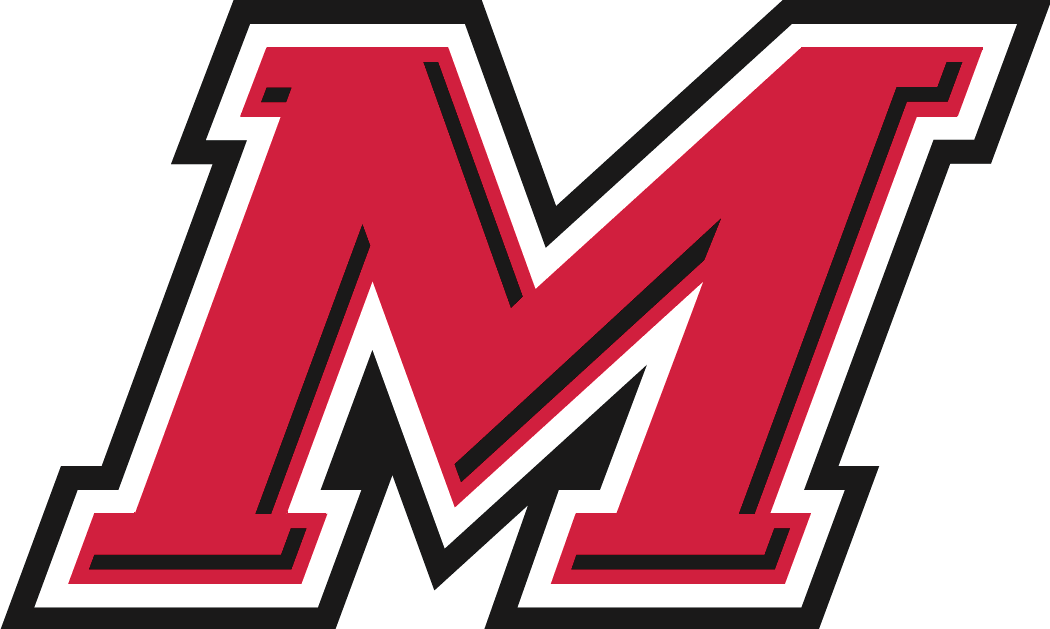
- Conference: Metro Atlantic Athletic Conference
- Record: 12–9 (10–8 MAAC)
- Head coach: John Dunne (3rd season)
- Assistant coaches: Serge Clement; Kevin Driscoll; Dalip Bhatia
- Home arena: McCann Arena

2020–21 MAAC men's basketball standings
	Conf.				Overall
Team	W		L	PCT	W		L	PCT
Siena	12	–	4	.750	12	–	5	.706
Monmouth	12	–	6	.667	12	–	8	.600
Saint Peter's	10	–	8	.556	14	–	11	.560
Marist	10	–	8	.556	12	–	9	.571
Niagara	7	–	9	.438	9	–	11	.450
Canisius	7	–	5	.583	7	–	6	.538
Fairfield	7	–	11	.389	10	–	17	.370
Quinnipiac	7	–	10	.412	9	–	13	.409
Iona †	6	–	3	.667	12	–	6	.667
Manhattan	6	–	12	.333	7	–	13	.350
Rider	5	–	13	.278	6	–	17	.261
† 2021 MAAC tournament winner Note: The MAAC has ordered standings based on league wins, not winning percentage, since all teams did not reach 20 conference games played. These standings were also used for seeding purposes in the 2021 MAAC tournament.

The 2020–21 Marist Red Foxes men's basketball team represented Marist College in the 2020–21 NCAA Division I men's basketball season. The Red Foxes, led by third-year head coach John Dunne, played their home games at the McCann Arena in Poughkeepsie, New York as members of the Metro Atlantic Athletic Conference.

They finished the season 12–9, 10–8 in MAAC play to finish in a tie for third place. As the No. 4 seed in the MAAC tournament, they lost in the quarterfinals to No. 5 seed Niagara 62–67. This marked the first overall and conference winning season for the Red Foxes since 2007–08 when they finished 18–14 overall, and 11–7 in the MAAC.

== Previous season ==
The Red Foxes finished the 2019–20 season 7–23 overall, 6–14 in MAAC play to finish in last place. As the No. 11 seed in the 2020 MAAC tournament, they were defeated by No. 6 seed Niagara in the first round 54–56. The tournament, and all postseason tournaments, were eventually cancelled amid the COVID-19 pandemic.

== Roster ==
2020–21 Marist Red Foxes men's basketball team
Players
Coaches

Pos.	#	Name	Height	Weight	Year	Hometown
G	0	Raheim Sullivan	6 ft 1 in (1.85 m)	175 lb (79 kg)	Jr	Toronto, Canada
G	1	Hakim Byrd	5 ft 10 in (1.78 m)	155 lb (70 kg)	Fr	Philadelphia, Pennsylvania
G	2	Ricardo Wright	6 ft 4 in (1.93 m)	185 lb (84 kg)	Fr	Eustis, Florida
G	5	Michael Cubbage	6 ft 4 in (1.93 m)	180 lb (82 kg)	RS Sr	Sicklerville, New Jersey
F	10	Henry Makeny	6 ft 7 in (2.01 m)	185 lb (84 kg)	So	Sydney, Australia
C	11	Victor Enoh	6 ft 7 in (2.01 m)	250 lb (113 kg)	RS Jr	Decatur, Georgia
G	13	Matt Herasme	6 ft 3 in (1.91 m)	180 lb (82 kg)	Jr	Chester, New York
C	15	Jordan Jones	6 ft 8 in (2.03 m)	205 lb (93 kg)	RS Sr	Baltimore, Maryland
G	20	Terrence Echols	6 ft 2 in (1.88 m)	185 lb (84 kg)	Sr	Fayetteville, New York
G	21	Tyler Saint-Furcy	6 ft 4 in (1.93 m)	180 lb (82 kg)	So	Inwood, New York
F	23	Javon Cooley	6 ft 5 in (1.96 m)	185 lb (84 kg)	Fr	Chicago, Illinois
F	24	Braden Bell	6 ft 7 in (2.01 m)	190 lb (86 kg)	Jr	Rowlett, Texas
G	25	Tucker Lee	6 ft 3 in (1.91 m)	180 lb (82 kg)	Sr	Kent, Connecticut
F	33	Zion Tordoff	6 ft 8 in (2.03 m)	220 lb (100 kg)	Sr	Bradford, England

Head coach

- John Dunne (Ithaca)

Assistant coach(es)

- Serge Clement (SUNY Potsdam)
- Kevin Driscoll (Misericordia)
- Dalip Bhatia (Rutgers)

Legend

- (C) Team captain
- (S) Suspended
- (I) Ineligible
- (W) Walk-on
- Injured
- Current redshirt

Roster
Last update: December 27, 2020

== Schedule and results ==
Date time, TV	Rank^{#}	Opponent^{#}	Result	Record	High points	High rebounds	High assists	Site (attendance) city, state
Non-conference regular season
November 28, 2019*; TBD		at Albany	Canceled due to COVID-19 issues					SEFCU Arena; Albany, NY
December 5, 2020*; 2:00 pm, ESPN3		at Binghamton	W 68–65 ^{OT}	1–0	18 – Cubbage	11 – Enoh	2 – Byrd, Sullivan	BU Events Center (0); Vestal, New York
December 6, 2020*; 4:00 pm, ESPN+		Binghamton	W 64–60	2–0	13 – Sullivan	6 – Bell, Jones	3 – Byrd	McCann Arena (1); Poughkeepsie, NY
MAAC regular season
December 11, 2020; 7:00 pm, ESPN3		at Canisius	L 72–81	2–1 (0–1)	17 – Byrd	10 – Cubbage	3 – Sullivan, Wright	Koessler Athletic Center (0); Buffalo, NY
December 12, 2020; 7:00 pm, ESPN3		at Canisius	W 56–52	3–1 (1–1)	10 – Byrd, Jones	7 – Herasme, Jones	3 – Sullivan	Koessler Athletic Center (0); Buffalo, NY
December 19, 2020; 2:00 pm, ESPN3		at Manhattan	W 61–39	4–1 (2–1)	20 – Byrd	7 – Jones	4 – Byrd	Draddy Gymnasium (0); Bronx, NY
December 20, 2020; 2:00 pm, ESPN3		at Manhattan	W 72–67 ^{OT}	5–1 (3–1)	18 – Wright	15 – Enoh	2 – 4 Tied	Draddy Gymnasium (0); Bronx, NY
January 1, 2021; 2:00 pm, ESPN+		Niagara	W 63–61	6–1 (4–1)	16 – Wright	9 – Jones	7 – Sullivan	McCann Arena; Poughkeepsie, NY
January 2, 2021; 2:00 pm, ESPN3		Niagara	L 72–86	6–2 (4–2)	19 – Wright	6 – Jones	5 – Sullivan	McCann Arena; Poughkeepsie, NY
January 9, 2021; 2:00 pm, ESPN+		at Monmouth	L 64–80	6–3 (4–3)	15 – Byrd	9 – Jones	5 – Byrd	OceanFirst Bank Center; West Long Branch, NJ
January 10, 2021; 2:00 pm, ESPN3		at Monmouth	L 62–72	6–4 (4–4)	11 – Byrd	7 – Enoh	5 – Byrd	OceanFirst Bank Center; West Long Branch, NJ
January 15, 2021; 5:00 pm, ESPN+		Fairfield	W 73–63	7–4 (5–4)	14 – Jones, Sullivan	7 – Herasme	9 – Sullivan	McCann Arena; Poughkeepsie, NY
January 16, 2021; 5:00 pm, ESPN3		Fairfield	L 52–55	7–5 (5–5)	17 – Jones	7 – Jones	4 – Sullivan	McCann Arena; Poughkeepsie, NY
January 22, 2021; 7:00 pm, ESPN3		at Rider	L 64–76	7–6 (5–6)	17 – Sullivan	8 – Herasme	4 – Sullivan	Alumni Gymnasium; Lawrenceville, NJ
January 23, 2021; 7:00 pm, ESPN+		at Rider	W 76–67	8–6 (6–6)	22 – Wright	8 – Herasme	4 – Herasme	Alumni Gymnasium; Lawrenceville, NJ
January 30, 2021; 1:00 pm, ESPN+		Siena	W 55–54	9–6 (7–6)	12 – Sullivan	6 – Bell	4 – Sullivan	McCann Arena; Poughkeepsie, NY
January 31, 2021; 3:00 pm, ESPN3		Siena	L 50–63	9–7 (7–7)	9 – Wright, Byrd	8 – Bell	1 – 5 tied	McCann Arena; Poughkeepsie, NY
February 19, 2021; 8:00 pm, ESPN+		at Saint Peter's	L 54–59	9–8 (7–8)	12 – Bell, Byrd	8 – Bell, Byrd	3 – Saint-Furcy	John J. Moore Athletics Center; Jersey City, NJ
February 20, 2021; 8:00 pm, ESPN3		at Saint Peter's	W 51–50	10–8 (8–8)	15 – Jones	8 – Wright	3 – Sullivan, Wright	John J. Moore Athletics Center; Jersey City, NJ
February 28, 2021; 4:00 pm, ESPN3		Quinnipiac	W 76–67	11–8 (9–8)	13 – Wright	9 – Bell	4 – Byrd	McCann Arena; Poughkeepsie, NY
March 1, 2021; 6:00 pm, ESPN+		Quinnipiac	W 65–52	12–8 (10–8)	19 – Wright	8 – Wright	3 – Herasme	McCann Arena; Poughkeepsie, NY
MAAC tournament
March 11, 2021; 7:30 pm, ESPN+	(4)	vs. (5) Niagara; Quarterfinals	L 62–67	12–9	14 – Jones	10 – Jones	2 – Sullivan, Wright	Boardwalk Hall; Atlantic City, NJ
*Non-conference game. ^{#}Rankings from AP Poll. (#) Tournament seedings in parentheses. All times are in Eastern; Source.

== Awards ==
Following the season, two Marist players were selected to the All-MAAC rookie team, freshman guards Hakim Byrd and Ricardo Wright. Byrd averaged 8.4 points per game and shot 83.7% from the free-throw line while playing in all 21 games, starting nine of them. Wright, who played all 21 games and started 17, led Marist in scoring average (11.0), minutes played per game (28.9), and shot 75% from the free-throw line.

== Statistics ==
=== Players ===
Legend
GP	Games played	GS	Games started	MPG	Minutes per game
FG%	Field-goal percentage	3P%	3-point field-goal percentage	FT%	Free-throw percentage
RPG	Rebounds per game	APG	Assists per game	SPG	Steals per game
BPG	Blocks per game	PPG	Points per game	Source:

PLAYER	GP	GS	MPG	FG%	3FG%	FT%	RPG	AST	STL	BLK	PPG
Braden Bell	21	11	23.5	.407	.324	.667	4.7	22	14	9	7.1
Hakim Byrd	21	9	23.6	.389	.319	.837	2.0	40	18	–	8.4
Javon Cooley	21	6	13.4	.391	.362	.737	1.8	13	2	4	3.9
Michael Cubbage	4	4	24.8	.471	.429	.750	5.3	2	6	–	11.0
Terrence Echols	1	0	2.0	–	–	–	–	–	–	–	0.0
Victor Enoh	16	2	18.4	.581	–	.667	5.1	4	8	12	3.9
Matt Herasme	18	13	26.5	.371	.273	.629	4.3	18	12	5	5.9
Jordan Jones	21	19	21.7	.591	–	.618	5.4	17	12	40	9.4
Lee Tucker	1	1	3.0	–	–	–	–	–	–	–	0.0
Henry Makeny	12	0	9.7	.500	.571	.000	1.9	4	2	4	1.7
Tyler Saint-Furcy	21	11	15.6	.396	.083	.531	2.2	8	11	7	2.7
Raheim Sullivan	21	12	28.6	.403	.261	.727	2.4	63	19	1	9.9
Ricardo Wright	21	17	28.9	.382	.327	.750	3.9	38	10	2	11.0
TOTALS	21	21	–	.427	.310	.684	35.0	229	114	84	63.43
OPPONENTS	21	21	–	.392	.309	.693	34.6	250	142	59	63.62

==== MAAC Leaders ====
Scoring

- Ricardo Wright (11.0/game): 23rd

Rebounding

- Jordan Jones (5.4/game): 21st
- Victor Enoh (5.1/game): 25th

Field Goal Percentage (minimum avg 5 attempted per game)

- Jordan Jones (78–132 .591): 3rd
- Braden Bell (57–140 .407): 24th

Assists per game

- Raheim Sullivan (3.0/game): 8th
- Hakim Byrd (1.9/game): 24th

Steals per game

- Raheim Sullivan (0.9/game): 24th

3-Point Field Goal Percentage (minimum avg 2 attempted per game)

- Javon Cooley (17–47 .362): 16th

3-Point Field Goals Made

- Ricardo Wright (34): 12th
- Braden Bell (24): 21st
- Hakim Byrd (23): 22nd

Blocked Shots

- Jordan Jones (40): 3rd
- Victor Enoh (12): 16th
- Braden Bell (9): 23rd

Assist/Turnover Ratio (minimum 3 assists/game)

- Raheim Sullivan (1.3): 6th

Offensive Rebounds

- Jordan Jones (39): 10th
- Victor Enoh (25): 25th

Minutes Played

- Ricardo Wright (28.9/game): 19th
- Raheim Sullivan (28.6/game): 24th

To qualify, players must have appeared in 75% of team's games.
