= 2020–21 Fairfield Stags men's basketball team =

American college basketball season

2020–21 Fairfield Stags men's basketball
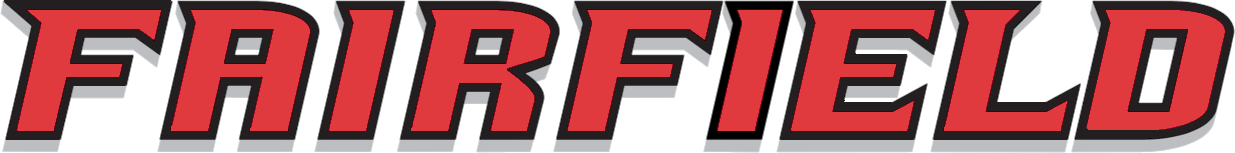
- Conference: Metro Atlantic Athletic Conference
- Record: 10–17 (7–11 MAAC)
- Head coach: Jay Young (2nd season)
- Assistant coaches: Chris Casey; Bryan Dougher; Patrick Sellers
- Home arena: Alumni Hall

2020–21 MAAC men's basketball standings
	Conf.				Overall
Team	W		L	PCT	W		L	PCT
Siena	12	–	4	.750	12	–	5	.706
Monmouth	12	–	6	.667	12	–	8	.600
Saint Peter's	10	–	8	.556	14	–	11	.560
Marist	10	–	8	.556	12	–	9	.571
Niagara	7	–	9	.438	9	–	11	.450
Canisius	7	–	5	.583	7	–	6	.538
Fairfield	7	–	11	.389	10	–	17	.370
Quinnipiac	7	–	10	.412	9	–	13	.409
Iona †	6	–	3	.667	12	–	6	.667
Manhattan	6	–	12	.333	7	–	13	.350
Rider	5	–	13	.278	6	–	17	.261
† 2021 MAAC tournament winner Note: The MAAC has ordered standings based on league wins, not winning percentage, since all teams did not reach 20 conference games played. These standings were also used for seeding purposes in the 2021 MAAC tournament.

The 2020–21 Fairfield Stags men's basketball team represented Fairfield University in the 2020–21 NCAA Division I men's basketball season. The Stags, led by second-year head coach Jay Young, played their home games at Alumni Hall in Fairfield, Connecticut as members of the Metro Atlantic Athletic Conference. They finished the season 10–17, 7–11 in MAAC play to finish in a tie for sixth place. As the No. 7 seed in the MAAC tournament, they defeated No. 10 seed Manhattan in the first round, upset No. 2 seed Monmouth in the quarterfinals, upset No. 3 seed Saint Peter's in the semifinals to reach the championship game, where they lost to No. 9 seed Iona 51–60.

== Previous season ==
The Stags finished the 2019–20 season 12–20, 8–12 in MAAC play to finish in a tie for eighth place. They lost in the first round of the MAAC tournament to Manhattan.

== Roster ==
2020–21 Fairfield Stags men's basketball team
Players
Coaches

Pos.	#	Name	Height	Weight	Year	Previous school	Hometown
G	0	Caleb Green	5 ft 10 in (1.78 m)	175 lb (79 kg)	RS Jr	Holy Cross	Londonderry, NH
F	1	Chris Maidoh	6 ft 10 in (2.08 m)	190 lb (86 kg)	So	Scotland Campus	New Carrollton, MD
G	2	Taj Benning	6 ft 4 in (1.93 m)	202 lb (92 kg)	Sr	Bergen Catholic HS	Fair Lawn, NJ
G	3	Jalen Leach	6 ft 4 in (1.93 m)	190 lb (86 kg)	Fr	Tilton School	Nyack, NY
G	4	Jake Wojcik	6 ft 5 in (1.96 m)	190 lb (86 kg)	Jr	Richmond	San Jose, CA
F	5	Supreme Cook	6 ft 9 in (2.06 m)	200 lb (91 kg)	Fr	The Peddie School	East Orange, NJ
F	10	Allan Jeanne-Rose	6 ft 7 in (2.01 m)	195 lb (88 kg)	So	St. John Paul II HS	Saint-Joseph, Martinique
G	11	Calvin Whipple	6 ft 4 in (1.93 m)	195 lb (88 kg)	Jr	Northfield Mount Hermon	Leominster, MA
G	12	Jack Mullally	5 ft 10 in (1.78 m)	165 lb (75 kg)	So	Xavier HS	Belle Harbor, NY
F	14	Jason Edokpayi	6 ft 6 in (1.98 m)	210 lb (95 kg)	Fr	Mount Saint Joseph HS	Laurel, MD
F	15	Jack Brown	6 ft 6 in (1.98 m)	195 lb (88 kg)	Fr	Brewster Academy	Greenville, DE
F	20	Zach Crisler	6 ft 9 in (2.06 m)	225 lb (102 kg)	So	Rice	North Wales, PA
G	21	Mark Henry	5 ft 11 in (1.8 m)	166 lb (75 kg)	So	Hamburg HS	Hamburg, NY
F	22	John Kelly	6 ft 7 in (2.01 m)	195 lb (88 kg)	So	Williston Northampton School	Shelton, CT
G	24	Jesus Cruz	6 ft 5 in (1.96 m)	210 lb (95 kg)	Sr	Loomis Chaffee School	Carolina, Puerto Rico
F	35	Tshiefu Ngalakulondi	6 ft 7 in (2.01 m)	215 lb (98 kg)	RS Jr	St. Bonaventure	Manchester, NH

Head coach

- Jay Young (Marist)

Assistant coach(es)

- Chris Casey (Western Connecticut State)
- Bryan Dougher (Stony Brook)
- Patrick Sellers (Central Connecticut State)

Legend

- (C) Team captain
- (S) Suspended
- (I) Ineligible
- (W) Walk-on
- Injured
- Current redshirt

Roster
Last update: December 25, 2020

== Schedule and results ==
Date time, TV	Rank^{#}	Opponent^{#}	Result	Record	Site (attendance) city, state
Regular season
November 25, 2020*; 2:00 pm, FS1		at Providence	L 56–97	0–1	Alumni Hall; Providence, RI
November 28, 2020*; 2:00 pm		at Stony Brook	Postponed		Island Federal Credit Union Arena; Stony Brook, NY
November 29, 2020*; 4:00 pm		at Sacred Heart	Canceled		William H. Pitt Center; Fairfield, CT
December 2, 2020*; 7:00 pm, ESPN3		Hartford	L 61–66	0–2	Alumni Hall; Fairfield, CT
December 4, 2020*; 4:00 pm, ESPN3		at Stony Brook	L 69–72 ^{OT}	0–3	Island Federal Credit Union Arena; Stony Brook, NY
December 7, 2020*; 4:00 pm, ESPN3		at Hartford	L 54–67	0–4	Chase Arena at Reich Family Pavilion; West Hartford, CT
December 11, 2020; 7:00 pm, ESPNU		Iona	L 42–70	0–5 (0–1)	Alumni Hall; Fairfield, CT
December 12, 2020; 7:00 pm, ESPN+		Iona	W 67–52	1–5 (1–1)	Alumni Hall; Fairfield, CT
December 18, 2020; 4:00 pm, ESPN3		at Niagara	L 51–68	1–6 (1–2)	Gallagher Center; Lewiston, NY
December 19, 2020; 4:00 pm, ESPN3		at Niagara	L 61–81	1–7 (1–3)	Gallagher Center; Lewiston, NY
December 22, 2020*; TBA		at William & Mary	Canceled		Kaplan Arena; Williamsburg, VA
December 22, 2020*; 3:00 pm, ESPN3		Fairleigh Dickinson	L 65–69	1–8	Alumni Hall; Fairfield, CT
January 1, 2021; 5:00 pm, ESPN+		Rider	L 62–70	1–9 (1–4)	Alumni Hall; Fairfield, CT
January 2, 2021; 5:00 pm, ESPN3		Rider	W 72–56	2–9 (2–4)	Alumni Hall; Fairfield, CT
January 9, 2021; 4:00 pm, ESPN+		Siena	L 58–74	2–10 (2–5)	Alumni Hall; Fairfield, CT
January 10, 2021; 4:00 pm, ESPN3		Siena	L 68–75	2–11 (2–6)	Alumni Hall; Fairfield, CT
January 15, 2021; 5:00 pm, ESPN+		at Marist	L 63–73	2–12 (2–7)	McCann Arena; Poughkeepsie, NY
January 16, 2021; 5:00 pm, ESPN3		at Marist	W 55–52	3–12 (3–7)	McCann Arena; Poughkeepsie, NY
February 7, 2021; 2:00 pm, ESPN3		Quinnipiac	L 63–78	3–13 (3–8)	Alumni Hall; Fairfield, CT
February 8, 2021; 2:00 pm, ESPN+		Quinnipiac	W 77–70	4–13 (4–8)	Alumni Hall; Fairfield, CT
February 13, 2021; 8:00 pm, ESPN3		at Saint Peter's	W 55–50	5–13 (5–8)	John J. Moore Athletics Center; Jersey City, NJ
February 14, 2021; 8:00 pm, ESPN+		at Saint Peter's	L 49–66	5–14 (5–9)	John J. Moore Athletics Center; Jersey City, NJ
February 19, 2021; 5:00 pm, ESPN+		Canisius	L 69–80	5–15 (5–10)	Alumni Hall; Fairfield, CT
February 20, 2021; 5:00 pm, ESPN3		Canisius	W 66–53	6–15 (6–10)	Alumni Hall; Fairfield, CT
March 4, 2021; 6:00 pm, ESPN+		at Manhattan	L 59–69	6–16 (6–11)	Draddy Gymnasium; Bronx, NY
March 5, 2021; 6:00 pm, ESPN3		at Manhattan	W 85–67	7–16 (7–11)	Draddy Gymnasium; Bronx, NY
MAAC tournament
March 9, 2021; 7:30 pm, ESPN+	(7)	vs. (10) Manhattan; First round	W 59–58 ^{OT}	8–16	Boardwalk Hall; Atlantic City, NJ
March 10, 2021; 7:30 pm, ESPN+	(7)	vs. (2) Monmouth; Quarterfinals	W 79–60	9–16	Boardwalk Hall; Atlantic City, NJ
March 12, 2021; 8:00 pm, ESPNU	(7)	vs. (3) Saint Peter's; Semifinals	W 52–47	10–16	Boardwalk Hall; Atlantic City, NJ
March 13, 2021; 4:00 pm, ESPNU	(7)	vs. (9) Iona; MAAC Championship	L 51–60	10–17	Boardwalk Hall; Atlantic City, NJ
*Non-conference game. ^{#}Rankings from AP Poll. (#) Tournament seedings in parentheses. All times are in Eastern.
