= 2020–21 Canisius Golden Griffins men's basketball team =

American college basketball season

2020–21 Canisius Golden Griffins men's basketball
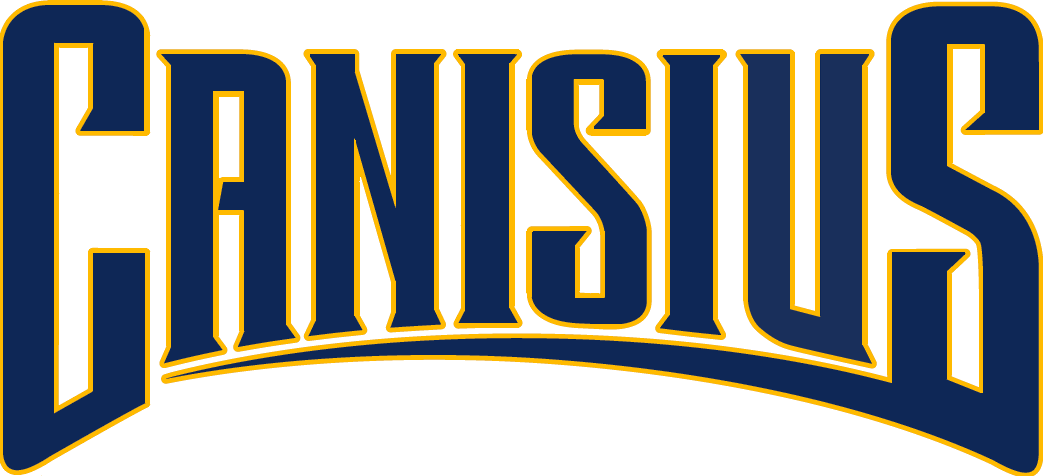
- Conference: Metro Atlantic Athletic Conference
- Record: 7–6 (7–5 MAAC)
- Head coach: Reggie Witherspoon (5th season)
- Assistant coaches: Chris Hawkins; Thurman Schaetzle; Calvin Cage
- Home arena: Koessler Athletic Center

2020–21 MAAC men's basketball standings
	Conf.				Overall
Team	W		L	PCT	W		L	PCT
Siena	12	–	4	.750	12	–	5	.706
Monmouth	12	–	6	.667	12	–	8	.600
Saint Peter's	10	–	8	.556	14	–	11	.560
Marist	10	–	8	.556	12	–	9	.571
Niagara	7	–	9	.438	9	–	11	.450
Canisius	7	–	5	.583	7	–	6	.538
Fairfield	7	–	11	.389	10	–	17	.370
Quinnipiac	7	–	10	.412	9	–	13	.409
Iona †	6	–	3	.667	12	–	6	.667
Manhattan	6	–	12	.333	7	–	13	.350
Rider	5	–	13	.278	6	–	17	.261
† 2021 MAAC tournament winner Note: The MAAC has ordered standings based on league wins, not winning percentage, since all teams did not reach 20 conference games played. These standings were also used for seeding purposes in the 2021 MAAC tournament.

The 2020–21 Canisius Golden Griffins men's basketball team represented Canisius College in the 2020–21 NCAA Division I men's basketball season. The Golden Griffins, led by fifth-year head coach Reggie Witherspoon, played their home games at the Koessler Athletic Center in Buffalo, New York as members of the Metro Atlantic Athletic Conference (MAAC). They finished the season 7–6, 7–5 in MAAC play, to finish in a tie for fifth place. As the No. 6 seed in the MAAC tournament, they lost in the first round to No. 11 seed Rider 76–78.

== Previous season ==
The Golden Griffins finished the 2019–20 season 12–20, 7–13 in MAAC play, to finish in tenth place. They lost in the first round of the MAAC tournament to Iona.

== Roster ==
2020–21 Canisius Golden Griffins men's basketball team
Players
Coaches

Pos.	#	Name	Height	Weight	Year	Previous school	Hometown
G	0	Akrum Ahemed	6 ft 5 in (1.96 m)	200 lb (91 kg)	So	Scotland Campus	Hackensack, NJ
G	1	Ahamadou Fofana	6 ft 1 in (1.85 m)	175 lb (79 kg)	Jr	Erie Community College	The Bronx, NY
F	2	Malek Green	6 ft 7 in (2.01 m)	220 lb (100 kg)	Jr	Morehead State	Cincinnati, OH
G	3	Jordan Henderson	6 ft 5 in (1.96 m)	190 lb (86 kg)	Jr	Indiana Elite Prep	Cincinnati, OH
F	4	Jalanni White	6 ft 8 in (2.03 m)	215 lb (98 kg)	Sr	Notre Dame-West Haven	New Haven, CT
G	5	Siem Uijtendaal	6 ft 6 in (1.98 m)	185 lb (84 kg)	Fr	BC Apollo Amsterdam	Haarlem, Netherlands
F	10	Jacco Fritz	6 ft 10 in (2.08 m)	210 lb (95 kg)	So	DME Academy	Tiel, Netherlands
G	11	Armon Harried	6 ft 4 in (1.93 m)	190 lb (86 kg)	So	Lake Clifton High School	Baltimore, MD
G	12	Asa Beyah	6 ft 3 in (1.91 m)	195 lb (88 kg)	Fr	Cheshire Academy	Utica, NY
G	15	Majesty Brandon	6 ft 0 in (1.83 m)	170 lb (77 kg)	Sr	Monroe Community College	The Bronx, NY
F	21	Scott Hitchon	6 ft 8 in (2.03 m)	215 lb (98 kg)	Sr	Thornlea Secondary School	Whitby, ON
F	22	George Maslennikov	6 ft 10 in (2.08 m)	230 lb (104 kg)	Jr	Saddleback College	Odesa, Ukraine
G	25	Malik Brooks	6 ft 2 in (1.88 m)	190 lb (86 kg)	So	Monmouth	Lockport, NY

Head coach

- Reggie Witherspoon (Wheeling)

Assistant coach(es)

- Chris Hawkins (Radford)
- Thurman Schaetzle (Canisius)
- Calvin Cage (Buffalo)

Legend

- (C) Team captain
- (S) Suspended
- (I) Ineligible
- (W) Walk-on
- Injured
- Current redshirt

Roster
Last update: December 29, 2020

== Schedule and results ==
Date time, TV	Rank^{#}	Opponent^{#}	Result	Record	Site (attendance) city, state
MAAC regular season
December 11, 2020; 7:00 p.m.		Marist	W 81–72	1–0 (1–0)	Koessler Athletic Center; Buffalo, NY
December 12, 2020; 7:00 p.m.		Marist	L 52–56	1–1 (1–1)	Koessler Athletic Center; Buffalo, NY
December 27, 2020; 2:00 p.m., ESPN3		at Monmouth	L 66–84	1–2 (1–2)	OceanFirst Bank Center; West Long Branch, NJ
December 28, 2020; 2:00 p.m., ESPN+		at Monmouth	L 69–97	1–3 (1–3)	OceanFirst Bank Center; West Long Branch, NJ
January 1, 2021; 1:00 p.m., ESPN+		Saint Peter's	W 70–58	2–3 (2–3)	Koessler Athletic Center; Buffalo, NY
January 2, 2021; 1:00 p.m.		Saint Peter's	W 63–60	3–3 (3–3)	Koessler Athletic Center; Buffalo, NY
February 12, 2021; 1:00 p.m.		Quinnipiac	W 74–67	4–3 (4–3)	People's United Center; Hamden, CT
February 13, 2021; 1:00 p.m.		Quinnipiac	W 89–70	5–3 (5–3)	People's United Center; Hamden, CT
February 19, 2021; 5:00 p.m.		at Fairfield	W 80–69	6–3 (6–3)	Alumni Hall; Fairfield, CT
February 20, 2021; 5:00 p.m., ESPN3		at Fairfield	L 53–66	6–4 (6–4)	Alumni Hall; Fairfield, CT
February 26, 2021		at Niagara	Canceled due to COVID-19 issues		Gallagher Center; Lewiston, NY
February 27, 2021		at Niagara	Canceled due to COVID-19 issues		Gallagher Center; Lewiston, NY
March 4, 2021; 7:00 p.m., ESPN3		at Siena	L 66–73	6–5 (6–5)	Alumni Recreation Center; Loudonville, NY
March 5, 2021; 7:00 p.m., ESPN3		at Siena	W 76–75	7–5 (7–5)	Alumni Recreation Center; Loudonville, NY
MAAC tournament
March 8, 2021; 7:00 p.m., ESPN+	(6)	vs. (11) Rider; First round	L 76–78	7–6	Boardwalk Hall (7–6); Atlantic City, NJ
*Non-conference game. ^{#}Rankings from AP poll. (#) Tournament seedings in parentheses. All times are in Eastern.
