= Jay Young (basketball) =

American basketball coach (born 1964)

Current position
- Title: Assistant coach
- Team: Rutgers
- Conference: Big Ten

Biographical details
- Born: September 22, 1964 (age 62)
- Education: Marist ('86)

Coaching career (HC unless noted)
- 1987–1988: Fitchburg State (assistant)
- 1988–1990: Salem State (assistant)
- 1990–1992: Northeastern (assistant)
- 1992–1996: Newbury
- 1996–2000: Northeastern (assistant)
- 2000–2005: New Haven
- 2005–2016: Stony Brook (assistant)
- 2016–2019: Rutgers (assistant)
- 2019–2023: Fairfield
- 2024–present: Rutgers (assistant)

Head coaching record
- Overall: 128–139 (.479)

Jay E. Young (born September 22, 1964) is an American basketball coach who is an assistant for the Rutgers Scarlet Knights. He served as head coach of the Fairfield Stags men's basketball team from 2019 to 2023.

== Coaching career ==
A 1986 Marist College graduate, Young played lacrosse for the Red Foxes where he was an all-conference selection. Immediately after college, Young took his first basketball coaching position at Fitchburg State, followed by a stint at Salem State, then to Northeastern. In 1992 he was named the head men's basketball coach at Newbury where he guided the Nighthawks to the 1995 NJCAA Division III Final Four and was also named District VI Coach of the Year in 1995 and Region XXI Coach of the Year in 1994 and 1995. After his successful spell at Newbury, Young returned to Northeastern as an assistant coach where he stayed until 2000 when he accepted the head coaching position at New Haven. While with the Chargers he led them to a 78–66 record and two NCAA Division II Regional appearances.

In 2006, Young joined Steve Pikiell's coaching staff at Stony Brook where he would stay for 11 seasons and be a part of four America East Conference regular season championships and one NCAA Tournament appearance in 2016. When Pikiell accepted the head coaching position at Rutgers, Young followed as an assistant coach.

On April 3, 2019 Young was named the 13th head coach in Fairfield history. On October 16, 2023, Young stepped down as head coach, ending his four-year tenure as head coach. He finished with a 50−73 record and zero NCAA tournament appearances.

== Head coaching record ==
=== NCAA DII ===
Record table
Season	Team	Overall	Conference	Standing	Postseason
New Haven (Independent/NYCAC) (2000–2005)
2000–01	New Haven	7–20	N/A		
2001–02	New Haven	14–13	N/A		
2002–03	New Haven	21–10	17–7	4th	NCAA Division II Second Round
2003–04	New Haven	21–9	17–7	5th	NCAA Division II First Round
2004–05	New Haven	15–14	13–11	8th	
New Haven:		78–66 (.542)	47–25 (.653)		
Total:		78–66 (.542)			
National champion Postseason invitational champion Conference regular season champion Conference regular season and conference tournament champion Division regular season champion Division regular season and conference tournament champion Conference tournament champion

=== NCAA DI ===
Record table
Season	Team	Overall	Conference	Standing	Postseason
Fairfield (MAAC) (2019–2023)
2019–20	Fairfield	12–20	8–12	T–8th	
2020–21	Fairfield	10–17	7–11	7th	
2021–22	Fairfield	15–18	8–12	T–7th	
2022–23	Fairfield	13–18	9–11	7th	
Fairfield:		50–73 (.407)	32–46 (.410)		
Total:		50–73 (.407)			
National champion Postseason invitational champion Conference regular season champion Conference regular season and conference tournament champion Division regular season champion Division regular season and conference tournament champion Conference tournament champion
