= 2019–20 Manhattan Jaspers basketball team =

American college basketball season

2019–20 Manhattan Jaspers basketball
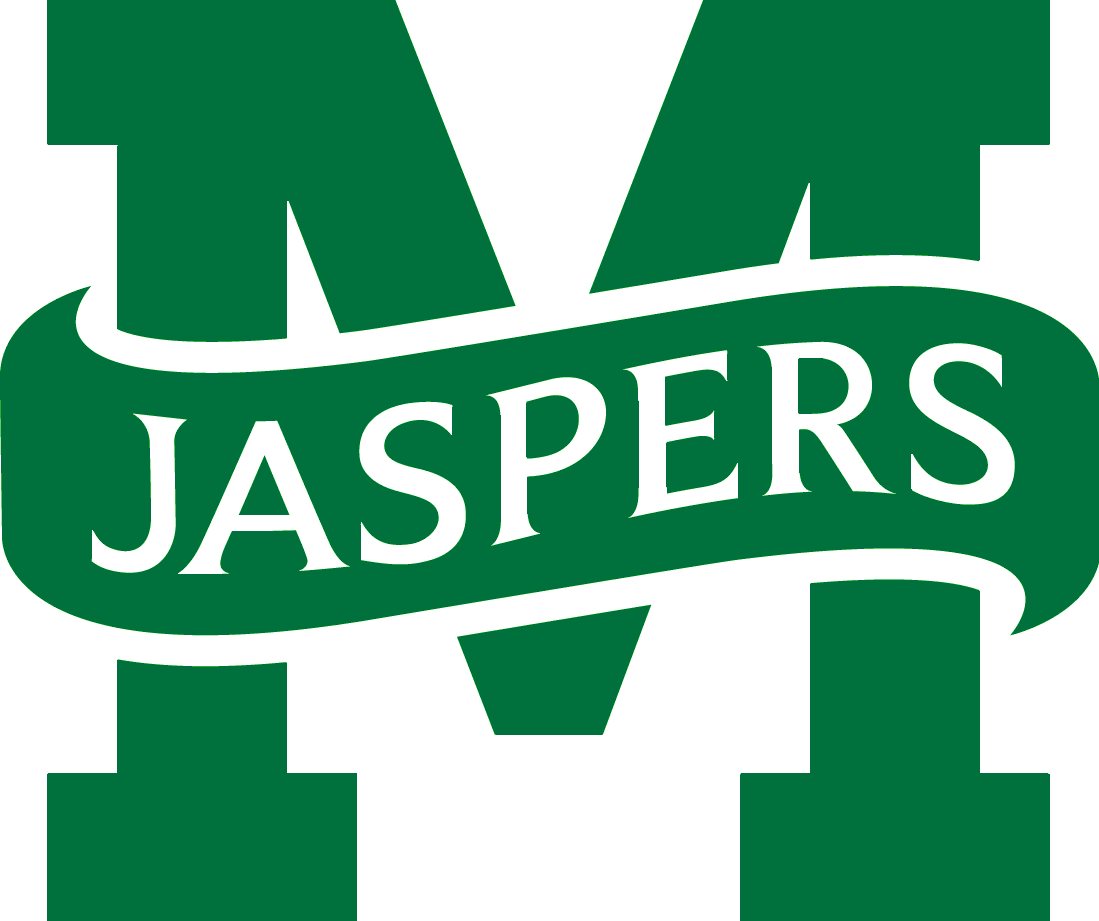
- Conference: Metro Atlantic Athletic Conference
- Record: 13–18 (8–12 MAAC)
- Head coach: Steve Masiello (9th season)
- Associate head coach: Matt Grady
- Assistant coaches: RaShawn Stores; Doug Thibault
- Home arena: Draddy Gymnasium

2019–20 MAAC men's basketball standings
	Conf.				Overall
Team	W		L	PCT	W		L	PCT
Siena	15	–	5	.750	20	–	10	.667
Saint Peter's	14	–	6	.700	18	–	12	.600
Rider	12	–	8	.600	18	–	12	.600
Monmouth	12	–	8	.600	18	–	13	.581
Quinnipiac	10	–	10	.500	15	–	15	.500
Niagara	9	–	11	.450	12	–	20	.375
Iona	9	–	11	.450	12	–	16	.429
Fairfield	8	–	12	.400	12	–	20	.375
Manhattan	8	–	12	.400	13	–	17	.433
Canisius	7	–	13	.350	12	–	20	.375
Marist	6	–	14	.300	7	–	23	.233
Note: The 2020 MAAC tournament was canceled during the quarterfinals due to the COVID-19 pandemic.

The 2019–20 Manhattan Jaspers basketball team represented Manhattan University (then called Manhattan College) in the 2019–20 NCAA Division I men's basketball season. The Jaspers, led by 9th-year head coach Steve Masiello, played their home games at Draddy Gymnasium in Riverdale, New York as members of the Metro Atlantic Athletic Conference (MAAC). They finished the season 13–18 overall, 8–12 in MAAC play, to finish in a tie for eighth place. As the #9 seed in the MAAC tournament, they defeated #8 seed Fairfield in the first round before losing to #1 seed Siena in the quarterfinals.

== Previous season ==
The Jaspers finished the 2018–19 season 11–21 overall, 8–10 in MAAC play, to finish in seventh place. As the No. 7 seed in the 2019 MAAC tournament, they defeated No. 10 seed Fairfield in the first round, before falling to No. 2 seed Canisius in the quarterfinals.

== Roster ==
2019–20 Manhattan Jaspers men's basketball team
Players
Coaches

Pos.	#	Name	Height	Weight	Year	Hometown
F	0	Warren Williams	6 ft 9 in (2.06 m)	240 lb (109 kg)	So	Kingston, Jamaica
G	1	Matthew Glassman	6 ft 0 in (1.83 m)	175 lb (79 kg)	So	Bedford, NH
G	2	Ethan Lasko	6 ft 2 in (1.88 m)	175 lb (79 kg)	Jr	Hollywood, FL
G	3	Romar Reid	6 ft 2 in (1.88 m)	175 lb (79 kg)	Fr	New Rochelle, NY
G	4	Samir Stewart	6 ft 0 in (1.83 m)	180 lb (82 kg)	So	Fort Lauderdale, FL
G	5	Jesse Boyce	6 ft 2 in (1.88 m)	190 lb (86 kg)	Sr	Thornwood, NY
G	10	Nehemiah Mack	6 ft 1 in (1.85 m)	190 lb (86 kg)	Jr	Harrisburg, PA
F	11	Daniel Schreier	6 ft 9 in (2.06 m)	220 lb (100 kg)	So	Santa Monica, CA
G	12	Christian Hinckson	6 ft 7 in (2.01 m)	210 lb (95 kg)	So	Queens, NY
F	14	Tyler Reynolds	6 ft 7 in (2.01 m)	215 lb (98 kg)	Sr	Syracuse, NY
G	15	Michael Okafor	6 ft 4 in (1.93 m)	200 lb (91 kg)	Jr	Toronto, ON
G	20	Alex Scariolo	6 ft 3 in (1.91 m)	180 lb (82 kg)	Fr	Marbella, Spain
G	21	Tony Hastings	5 ft 11 in (1.8 m)	180 lb (82 kg)	Fr	New City, NY
G	23	Tykei Greene	6 ft 4 in (1.93 m)	205 lb (93 kg)	So	Queens, NY
F	24	Ebube Ebube	6 ft 7 in (2.01 m)	220 lb (100 kg)	Jr	San Juan, Puerto Rico
F	25	Brendan Cama	6 ft 4 in (1.93 m)	200 lb (91 kg)	Fr	New Rochelle, NY
G	30	Elijah Buchanan	6 ft 5 in (1.96 m)	190 lb (86 kg)	So	The Bronx, NY
C	31	Adam Cisse	6 ft 10 in (2.08 m)	220 lb (100 kg)	Fr	The Bronx, NY
F	32	Kevin Salis	6 ft 6 in (1.98 m)	210 lb (95 kg)	Jr	Cornwall, NY
F	33	Pauly Paulicap	6 ft 8 in (2.03 m)	220 lb (100 kg)	Sr	Elmont, NY
G	55	Darryl Jr. Parsons	6 ft 0 in (1.83 m)	180 lb (82 kg)	Fr	Atlanta, GA

Head coach

- Steve Masiello (Kentucky)

Assistant coach(es)

- Matt Grady (Saint Joseph's)
- RaShawn Stores (Manhattan)
- Doug Thibault (Boise State)

Legend

- (C) Team captain
- (S) Suspended
- (I) Ineligible
- (W) Walk-on
- Injured
- Current redshirt

Roster
Last update: November 15, 2019

== Schedule and results ==
Date time, TV	Rank^{#}	Opponent^{#}	Result	Record	Site (attendance) city, state
Non-conference regular season
November 12, 2019*; 7:00 p.m., ESPN+		Delaware State	W 85–74	1–0	Draddy Gymnasium (920); Riverdale, NY
November 16, 2019*; 7:00 p.m., ESPN3		Albany	W 57–51	2–0	Draddy Gymnasium (1,029); Riverdale, NY
November 19, 2019*; 7:30 p.m., ESPN+		at Samford	L 57–70	2–1	Pete Hanna Center (470); Homewood, AL
November 23, 2019*; 4:00 p.m.		at Elon	W 69–64	3–1	Schar Center (1,137); Elon, NC
November 27, 2019*; 4:00 p.m., ESPN+		at Rhode Island	L 64–73	3–2	Ryan Center (4,432); Kingston, RI
December 2, 2019*; 7:00 p.m., ESPN+		at Stony Brook	L 47–65	3–3	Island Federal Credit Union Arena (2,083); Stony Brook, NY
December 7, 2019*; 2:00 p.m., ESPN+		at Fordham; Battle of the Bronx	W 54–53 ^{OT}	4–3	Rose Hill Gymnasium (2,298); The Bronx, NY
December 14, 2019*; 7:00 p.m., ESPN+		Western Michigan	L 58–59	4–4	Draddy Gymnasium (1,002); Riverdale, NY
December 22, 2019*; 12:00 p.m.		at Hofstra	L 51–63	4–5	Mack Sports Complex (2,257); Hempstead, NY
MAAC regular season
January 3, 2020; 7:00 p.m., ESPN+		at Canisius	W 71–67	5–5 (1–0)	Koessler Athletic Center (829); Buffalo, NY
January 5, 2020; 1:00 p.m., ESPN+		at Niagara	W 67–62	6–5 (2–0)	Gallagher Center (1,078); Lewiston, NY
January 10, 2020; 7:00 p.m., ESPN+		at Fairfield	L 60–68	6–6 (2–1)	Alumni Hall (1,754); Fairfield, CT
January 12, 2020; 2:00 p.m., ESPN+		Siena	W 81–69	7–6 (3–1)	Draddy Gymnasium (1,657); Riverdale, NY
January 16, 2019; 7:00 p.m., ESPN+		Quinnipiac	W 69–57	8–6 (4–1)	Draddy Gymnasium (1,005); Riverdale, NY
January 18, 2020; 7:00 p.m., ESPN+		Monmouth	L 58–65	8–7 (4–2)	Draddy Gymnasium (977); Riverdale, NY
January 22, 2020; 7:00 p.m., ESPN3		at Marist	L 73–75	8–8 (4–3)	McCann Arena (1,194); Poughkeepsie, NY
January 26, 2020; 7:00 p.m., ESPN+		Rider	L 63–67	8–9 (4–4)	Draddy Gymnasium (1,248); Riverdale, NY
January 31, 2020; 7:00 p.m., ESPN+		at Saint Peter's	L 53–70	8–10 (4–5)	Yanitelli Center (608); Jersey City, NJ
February 2, 2020; 12:00 p.m., ESPN+		Iona	W 72–49	9–10 (5–5)	Draddy Gymnasium (1,289); Riverdale, NY
February 7, 2020; 7:00 p.m., ESPNU		Niagara	W 77–59	10–10 (6–5)	Draddy Gymnasium (1,345); Riverdale, NY
February 9, 2020; 2:00 p.m., ESPN3		at Quinnipiac	W 65–63	11–10 (7–5)	People's United Center (1,322); Hamden, CT
February 14, 2020; 7:00 p.m., ESPN3		at Iona	L 57–80	11–11 (7–6)	Hynes Athletic Center (1,694); New Rochelle, NY
February 16, 2020; 2:00 p.m., ESPN3		at Siena	L 52–65	11–12 (7–7)	Times Union Center (7,146); Albany, NY
February 21, 2020; 7:00 p.m., ESPN3		Saint Peter's	L 64–67	11–13 (7–8)	Draddy Gymnasium (1,112); Riverdale, NY
February 23, 2020; 2:00 p.m., ESPN3		Canisius	L 56–57	11–14 (7–9)	Draddy Gymnasium (1,347); Riverdale, NY
February 26, 2020; 7:00 p.m., ESPN+		Marist	W 65–56	12–14 (8–9)	Draddy Gymnasium (923); Riverdale, NY
March 1, 2020; 2:00 p.m., ESPN3		at Monmouth	L 60–80	12–15 (8–10)	OceanFirst Bank Center (3,271); West Long Branch, NJ
March 4, 2020; 7:00 p.m., ESPN3		at Rider	L 59–71	12–16 (8–11)	Alumni Gymnasium (1,611); Lawrenceville, NJ
March 6, 2020; 7:00 p.m., ESPN3		Fairfield	L 50–66	12–17 (8–12)	Draddy Gymnasium (1,002); Riverdale, NY
MAAC tournament
March 10, 2020; 5:00 p.m., ESPN3	(9)	vs. (8) Fairfield; First round	W 61–43	13–17	Boardwalk Hall (878); Atlantic City, NJ
March 11, 2020; 7:00 p.m., ESPN3	(9)	vs. (1) Siena; Quarterfinals	L 49–63	13–18	Boardwalk Hall; Atlantic City, NJ
*Non-conference game. ^{#}Rankings from AP poll. (#) Tournament seedings in parentheses. All times are in Eastern.
