= 2019–20 Niagara Purple Eagles men's basketball team =

American college basketball season

2019–20 Niagara Purple Eagles men's basketball
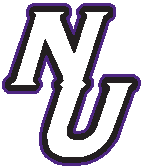
- Conference: Metro Atlantic Athletic Conference
- Record: 12–20 (9–11 MAAC)
- Head coach: Greg Paulus (1st season)
- Assistant coaches: Bryan Smothers; Brett Ervin
- Home arena: Gallagher Center

2019–20 MAAC men's basketball standings
	Conf.				Overall
Team	W		L	PCT	W		L	PCT
Siena	15	–	5	.750	20	–	10	.667
Saint Peter's	14	–	6	.700	18	–	12	.600
Rider	12	–	8	.600	18	–	12	.600
Monmouth	12	–	8	.600	18	–	13	.581
Quinnipiac	10	–	10	.500	15	–	15	.500
Niagara	9	–	11	.450	12	–	20	.375
Iona	9	–	11	.450	12	–	16	.429
Fairfield	8	–	12	.400	12	–	20	.375
Manhattan	8	–	12	.400	13	–	17	.433
Canisius	7	–	13	.350	12	–	20	.375
Marist	6	–	14	.300	7	–	23	.233
Note: The 2020 MAAC tournament was canceled during the quarterfinals due to the COVID-19 pandemic.

The 2019–20 Niagara Purple Eagles men's basketball team represented Niagara University in the 2019–20 NCAA Division I men's basketball season. The Purple Eagles, led by 1st-year head coach Greg Paulus, played their home games at the Gallagher Center in Lewiston, New York as members of the Metro Atlantic Athletic Conference. They finished the season 12–20 overall, 9–11 in MAAC play to finish in a tie for sixth place. As the #6 seed in the MAAC tournament, they defeated #11 seed Marist 56–54 in the first round. Before they could face #3 seeded Rider in the MAAC tournament quarterfinals, all postseason tournaments were cancelled amid the COVID-19 pandemic.

== Previous season ==
The Purple Eagles finished the 2018–19 season 13–19 overall, 6–12 in MAAC play to finish in a three-way tie for ninth place. As the 11th seed in the 2019 MAAC tournament, they were defeated by No. 6 seed Monmouth in the first round, 76–72.

On March 11, 2019, head coach Chris Casey was fired. He finished at Niagara with a six-year record of 64–129. On March 28, 2019, Niagara hired Patrick Beilein as their new head coach. On October 24, it was announced that head coach Patrick Beilein would be stepping down from his job, citing personal reasons. That same day, assistant coach Greg Paulus was announced as interim head coach.

== Roster ==
2019–20 Niagara Purple Eagles men's basketball team
Players
Coaches

Pos.	#	Name	Height	Weight	Year	Hometown
G	0	Justin Roberts	5 ft 10 in (1.78 m)	189 lb (86 kg)	RS Jr	Lawrence, Kansas
F	1	Kobi Nwandu	6 ft 6 in (1.98 m)	210 lb (95 kg)	Jr	York, Pennsylvania
F	2	Noah Waterman	6 ft 11 in (2.11 m)	210 lb (95 kg)	Fr	Savannah, New York
F	4	Italo Cicotti	6 ft 6 in (1.98 m)	205 lb (93 kg)	Jr	São Paulo, Brazil
G	5	James Towns	5 ft 10 in (1.78 m)	170 lb (77 kg)	Sr	Detroit, Michigan
G	10	Marcus Hammond	6 ft 2 in (1.88 m)	160 lb (73 kg)	So	Queens, New York
G	11	Raheem Solomon	6 ft 3 in (1.91 m)	180 lb (82 kg)	So	Hartford, Connecticut
G	12	Shandon Brown	5 ft 9 in (1.75 m)	175 lb (79 kg)	So	Boston, Massachusetts
F	15	Greg Kuakumensah	6 ft 6 in (1.98 m)	200 lb (91 kg)	Jr	Worcester, Massachusetts
G	21	Damani Thomas	6 ft 2 in (1.88 m)	165 lb (75 kg)	Fr	Kingston, New York
G/F	22	Nick MacDonald	6 ft 5 in (1.96 m)	185 lb (84 kg)	Fr	Amherst, New York
G	24	Trey Syroka	5 ft 10 in (1.78 m)	150 lb (68 kg)	Fr	Toledo, Ohio
F	32	Will Engelhardt	6 ft 7 in (2.01 m)	205 lb (93 kg)	Fr	Syracuse, New York
G	33	Steven Levnaic	6 ft 2 in (1.88 m)	180 lb (82 kg)	Fr	Hamilton, Ontario
F	34	Nicholas Kratholm	6 ft 9 in (2.06 m)	220 lb (100 kg)	Jr	Louisville, Kentucky

Head coach

- Greg Paulus (Duke)

Assistant coach(es)

- Bryan Smothers (Wayne State)
- Brett Ervin (West Virginia Wesleyan)

Legend

- (C) Team captain
- (S) Suspended
- (I) Ineligible
- (W) Walk-on
- Injured
- Current redshirt

Roster
Last update: November 22, 2019

== Schedule and results ==
Date time, TV	Rank^{#}	Opponent^{#}	Result	Record	Site (attendance) city, state
Exhibition
November 1, 2019*; 7:00 pm		Roberts Wesleyan	W 72–57		Gallagher Center (267); Lewiston, NY
Non-conference regular season
November 8, 2019*; 7:00 pm		at Drexel; Garden State Showcase	L 64–72	0–1	Daskalakis Athletic Center (1,129); Philadelphia, PA
November 10, 2019*; 1:00 pm, BTN Plus		at Rutgers; Garden State Showcase	L 39–86	0–2	Louis Brown Athletic Center (4,203); Piscataway, NJ
November 13, 2019*; 7:30 pm, ESPN+		at Stephen F. Austin; Garden State Showcase	L 80–89	0–3	William R. Johnson Coliseum (2,441); Nacogdoches, TX
November 18, 2019*; 7:00 pm		Bryant; Garden State Showcase	L 62–73	0–4	Gallagher Center (1,251); Lewiston, NY
November 27, 2019*; 7:00 pm		at Purdue Fort Wayne	L 54–77	0–5	Allen County War Memorial Coliseum (1,055); Fort Wayne, IN
December 1, 2019*; 4:00 pm		at Norfolk State	W 65–61	1–5	Joseph G. Echols Memorial Hall (824); Norfolk, VA
December 8, 2019*; 1:00 pm		Colgate	W 93–82	2–5	Gallagher Center (1,276); Lewiston, NY
December 14, 2019*; 7:00 pm		at Albany	L 80–84	2–6	SEFCU Arena (1,776); Albany, NY
December 18, 2019*; 7:00 pm		at St. Bonaventure	L 70–87	2–7	Reilly Center (2,016); St. Bonaventure, NY
December 21, 2019*; 2:00 pm		at Buffalo	L 72–92	2–8	Alumni Arena (2,644); Amherst, NY
December 28, 2019*; 7:00 pm		at Syracuse	L 57–71	2–9	Carrier Dome (18,125); Syracuse, NY
MAAC regular season
January 3, 2020; 7:00 pm, ESPN+		Fairfield	W 75–66	3–9 (1–0)	Gallagher Center (1,115); Lewiston, NY
January 5, 2020; 1:00 pm, ESPN+		Manhattan	L 62–67	3–10 (1–1)	Gallagher Center (1,078); Lewiston, NY
January 10, 2020; 7:00 pm, ESPN3		at Quinnipiac	L 56–67	3–11 (1–2)	People's United Center (912); Hamden, CT
January 12, 2020; 1:00 pm, ESPN+		at Iona	W 70–69	4–11 (2–2)	Hynes Athletic Center (1,317); New Rochelle, NY
January 17, 2020; 7:00 pm, ESPN+		Rider	W 70–68	5–11 (3–2)	Gallagher Center (980); Lewiston, NY
January 19, 2020; 1:00 pm, ESPN+		Siena	W 72–71	6–11 (4–2)	Gallagher Center (1,020); Lewiston, NY
January 24, 2020; 7:00 pm, ESPN+		at Monmouth	L 71–82	6–12 (4–3)	OceanFirst Bank Center (2,415); West Long Branch, NJ
January 26, 2020; 2:00 pm, ESPN3		at Saint Peter's	L 53–58	6–13 (4–4)	Yanitelli Center (522); Jersey City, NJ
January 31, 2020; 7:00 pm, ESPN3		Marist	L 48–67	6–14 (4–5)	Gallagher Center (1,066); Lewiston, NY
February 2, 2020; 1:00 pm, ESPN+		Quinnipiac	W 75–59	7–14 (5–5)	Gallagher Center (935); Lewiston, NY
February 7, 2020; 7:00 pm, ESPNU		at Manhattan	L 59–77	7–15 (5–6)	Draddy Gymnasium (1,345); Riverdale, NY
February 9, 2020; 2:00 pm, ESPN3		at Rider	L 58–73	7–16 (5–7)	Alumni Gymnasium (1,528); Lawrenceville, NJ
February 12, 2020; 7:00 pm, ESPN3		Canisius; Battle of the Bridge	W 69–66	8–16 (6–7)	Gallagher Center (1,568); Lewiston, NY
February 16, 2020; 1:00 pm, ESPN3		Monmouth	W 77–72	9–16 (7–7)	Gallagher Center (1,111); Lewiston, NY
February 21, 2020; 7:00 pm, ESPN3		at Fairfield	L 60–61	9–17 (7–8)	Alumni Hall (1,656); Fairfield, CT
February 23, 2020; 2:00 pm, ESPN+		at Marist	L 54–76	9–18 (7–9)	McCann Arena (1,549); Poughkeepsie, NY
February 27, 2020; 7:00 pm, ESPN+		Saint Peter's	W 63–54	10–18 (8–9)	Gallagher Center (985); Lewiston, NY
February 29, 2020; 1:00 pm, ESPN3		Iona	W 100–91 ^{OT}	11–18 (9–9)	Gallagher Center (1,193); Lewiston, NY
March 4, 2020; 7:00 pm, ESPN3		at Siena	L 55–77	11–19 (9–10)	Times Union Center (7,146); Albany, NY
March 6, 2020; 7:00 pm, ESPN+		at Canisius; Battle of the Bridge	L 63–67	11–20 (9–11)	Koessler Athletic Center (1,805); Buffalo, NY
MAAC tournament
March 10, 2020; 10:15 pm, ESPN3	(6)	vs. (11) Marist; First round	W 56–54	12–20	Boardwalk Hall (878); Atlantic City, NJ
March 12, 2020; 7:00 pm, ESPN3	(6)	vs. (3) Rider; Quarterfinals	Canceled due to the COVID-19 pandemic		Boardwalk Hall; Atlantic City, NJ
*Non-conference game. ^{#}Rankings from AP Poll. (#) Tournament seedings in parentheses. All times are in Eastern.
