= 2019–20 Monmouth Hawks men's basketball team =

American college basketball season

2019–20 Monmouth Hawks men's basketball
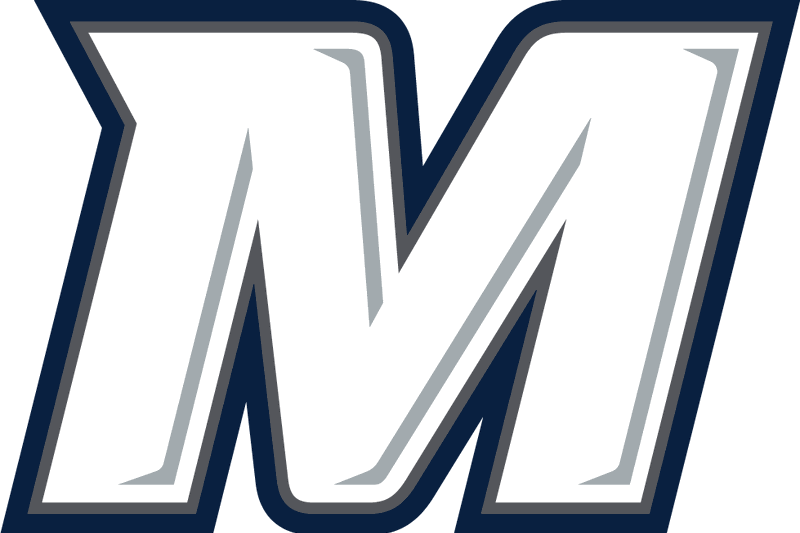
- Conference: Metro Atlantic Athletic Conference
- Record: 18–13 (12–8 MAAC)
- Head coach: King Rice (9th season)
- Assistant coaches: Rick Callahan; Jamal Meeks; JR Reid
- Home arena: OceanFirst Bank Center

2019–20 MAAC men's basketball standings
	Conf.				Overall
Team	W		L	PCT	W		L	PCT
Siena	15	–	5	.750	20	–	10	.667
Saint Peter's	14	–	6	.700	18	–	12	.600
Rider	12	–	8	.600	18	–	12	.600
Monmouth	12	–	8	.600	18	–	13	.581
Quinnipiac	10	–	10	.500	15	–	15	.500
Niagara	9	–	11	.450	12	–	20	.375
Iona	9	–	11	.450	12	–	16	.429
Fairfield	8	–	12	.400	12	–	20	.375
Manhattan	8	–	12	.400	13	–	17	.433
Canisius	7	–	13	.350	12	–	20	.375
Marist	6	–	14	.300	7	–	23	.233
Note: The 2020 MAAC tournament was canceled during the quarterfinals due to the COVID-19 pandemic.

The 2019–20 Monmouth Hawks men's basketball team represented Monmouth University in the 2019–20 NCAA Division I men's basketball season. The Hawks, led by ninth-year head coach King Rice, played their home games at OceanFirst Bank Center in West Long Branch, New Jersey as members of the Metro Atlantic Athletic Conference. They finished the season 18–13 overall, 12–8 in MAAC play to finish in a tie for third place. Before they could face #5 seeded Quinnipiac in the MAAC tournament quarterfinals, all postseason tournaments were cancelled amid the COVID-19 pandemic.

== Previous season ==
The Hawks finished the 2018–19 season 14–21 overall, 10–8 in MAAC play to finish in 6th place. In the MAAC tournament, they defeated Niagara, Quinnipiac, and Canisius before losing to Iona 81–60 in the championship game.

== Roster ==
2019–20 Monmouth Hawks men's basketball team
Players
Coaches

Pos.	#	Name	Height	Weight	Year	Hometown
G	0	Ray Salnave	6 ft 3 in (1.91 m)	205 lb (93 kg)	RS Jr	Elmont, New York
G	1	Gob Gabriel	6 ft 7 in (2.01 m)	175 lb (79 kg)	Fr	Manchester, New Hampshire
F	2	Melik Martin	6 ft 6 in (1.98 m)	200 lb (91 kg)	Jr	York, Pennsylvania
G	3	Deion Hammond	6 ft 4 in (1.93 m)	200 lb (91 kg)	Jr	Mitchellville, Maryland
F	4	Mustapha Traore	6 ft 8 in (2.03 m)	210 lb (95 kg)	RS Sr	Philadelphia, Pennsylvania
G	5	George Papas	6 ft 5 in (1.96 m)	175 lb (79 kg)	Jr	Jersey City, New Jersey
F	10	Jarvis Vaughan	6 ft 9 in (2.06 m)	225 lb (102 kg)	Fr	Churchville, Virginia
G	11	Donovann Toatley	5 ft 9 in (1.75 m)	185 lb (84 kg)	So	Largo, Maryland
G	13	Marcus McClary	6 ft 3 in (1.91 m)	195 lb (88 kg)	Jr	Linden, New Jersey
G	15	Mike James Jr.	6 ft 0 in (1.83 m)	170 lb (77 kg)	So	West Hempstead, New York
F	21	Nikkei Rutty	6 ft 8 in (2.03 m)	225 lb (102 kg)	So	New Rochelle, New York
G	24	Louie Pillari	6 ft 6 in (1.98 m)	200 lb (91 kg)	RS Sr	Tinton Falls, New Jersey
G	25	Samuel Chaput	6 ft 0 in (1.83 m)	175 lb (79 kg)	So	Longueuil, Quebec
F	33	Jake Glezen	6 ft 8 in (2.03 m)	240 lb (109 kg)	Fr	Wantagh, New York
C	44	Sam Ibiezugbe	6 ft 11 in (2.11 m)	245 lb (111 kg)	Sr	Simsbury, Connecticut

Head coach

- King Rice (North Carolina)

Assistant coach(es)

- Rick Callahan (Salem International)
- Jamal Meeks (Indiana)
- JR Reid (North Carolina)

Legend

- (C) Team captain
- (S) Suspended
- (I) Ineligible
- (W) Walk-on
- Injured
- Current redshirt

Roster
Last update: November 18, 2019

== Schedule and results ==
Date time, TV	Rank^{#}	Opponent^{#}	Result	Record	Site (attendance) city, state
Non-conference regular season
November 5, 2019*; 7:00 pm		at Lehigh	W 66–62	1–0	Stabler Arena (621); Bethlehem, PA
November 9, 2019*; 4:00 pm		at Hofstra	L 74–94	1–1	Mack Sports Complex (3,897); Hempstead, NY
November 13, 2019*; 8:00 pm, ESPN+		at Kansas State; Fort Myers Tip-Off	L 54–73	1–2	Bramlage Coliseum (7,635); Manhattan, KS
November 15, 2019*; 6:00 pm, ESPN+		at No. 5 Kansas	L 57–112	1–3	Allen Fieldhouse (16,300); Lawrence, KS
November 18, 2019*; 7:00 pm, ACCN		at Pittsburgh; Fort Myers Tip-Off	L 50–63	1–4	Petersen Events Center (6,753); Pittsburgh, PA
November 22, 2019*; 8:30 pm		vs. Kennesaw State; MAAC/ASUN Challenge	W 71–40	2–4	HP Field House (153); Orlando, FL
November 23, 2019*; 8:30 pm		vs. Stetson; MAAC/ASUN Challenge	L 55–63	2–5	HP Field House (121); Orlando, FL
November 26, 2019*; 7:30 pm		Radford; Fort Myers Tip-Off	W 80–63	3–5	OceanFirst Bank Center (1,388); West Long Branch, NJ
November 27, 2019*; 7:00 pm		Norfolk State; Fort Myers Tip-Off	W 75–71	4–5	OceanFirst Bank Center (1,369); West Long Branch, NJ
December 10, 2019*; 8:00 pm		at Princeton	L 66–67	5–5	Jadwin Gymnasium (1,254); Princeton, NJ
December 21, 2019*; 2:00 pm		Albany	W 72–70	6–5	OceanFirst Bank Center (1,669); West Long Branch, NJ
MAAC regular season
January 3, 2020; 7:00 pm		at Siena	L 72–75	6–6 (0–1)	Times Union Center (6,273); Albany, NY
January 5, 2020; 2:00 pm, ESPN3		Iona	W 73–61	7–6 (1–1)	OceanFirst Bank Center (2,261); West Long Branch, NJ
January 10, 2020; 7:00 pm, ESPN+		Canisius	W 84–65	8–6 (2–1)	OceanFirst Bank Center (1,720); West Long Branch, NJ
January 12, 2020; 2:00 pm, ESPN3		at Quinnipiac	L 70–84	8–7 (2–2)	People's United Center (903); Hamden, CT\
January 16, 2020; 7:00 pm, ESPN+		Marist	W 74–66	9–7 (3–2)	OceanFirst Bank Center (1,664); West Long Branch, NJ
January 18, 2020; 7:00 pm, ESPN+		at Manhattan	W 65–58	10–7 (4–2)	Draddy Gymnasium (977); Bronx, NY
January 24, 2020; 7:00 pm, ESPN+		Niagara	W 82–71	11–7 (5–2)	OceanFirst Bank Center (2,415); West Long Branch, NJ
January 26, 2020; 1:00 pm, ESPN+		at Iona	W 94–88	12–7 (6–2)	Hynes Athletic Center (1,313); New Rochelle, NY
January 29, 2020; 7:00 pm, ESPN3		at Saint Peter's	L 63–66	12–8 (6–3)	Yanitelli Center (655); Jersey City, NJ
February 2, 2020; 1:00 pm, ESPN+		Rider	W 90–84	13–8 (7–3)	OceanFirst Bank Center (2,067); West Long Branch, NJ
February 4, 2020; 7:00 pm, ESPN+		at Fairfield	L 53–55	13–9 (7–4)	Webster Bank Arena (1,023); Bridgeport, CT
February 9, 2020; 2:00 pm, ESPN+		Saint Peter's	L 69–81	13–10 (7–5)	OceanFirst Bank Center (3,217); West Long Branch, NJ
February 14, 2020; 7:00 pm, ESPN3		at Canisius	W 85–71	14–10 (8–5)	Koessler Athletic Center (883); Buffalo, NY
February 16, 2020; 1:00 pm, ESPN3		at Niagara	L 72–77	14–11 (8–6)	Gallagher Center (1,111); Lewiston, NY
February 21, 2020; 7:00 pm, ESPN3		at Marist	W 65–61 ^{OT}	15–11 (9–6)	McCann Arena (1,235); Poughkeepsie, NY
February 23, 2020; 2:00 pm, ESPN+		Quinnipiac	W 89–78	16–11 (10–6)	OceanFirst Bank Center (2,476); West Long Branch, NJ
February 28, 2020; 7:00 pm, ESPN3		at Rider	L 67–79	16–12 (10–7)	Alumni Gymnasium (1,650); Lawrenceville, NJ
March 1, 2020; 2:00 pm, ESPN3		Manhattan	W 80–60	17–12 (11–7)	OceanFirst Bank Center (3,271); West Long Branch, NJ
March 4, 2020; 7:00 pm, ESPN3		Fairfield	W 69–45	18–12 (12–7)	OceanFirst Bank Center (1,752); West Long Branch, NJ
March 6, 2020; 7:00 pm, ESPN+		Siena	L 72–86	18–13 (12–8)	OceanFirst Bank Center (2,657); West Long Branch, NJ
MAAC tournament
March 12, 2020; 9:30 pm, ESPN3	(4)	vs. (5) Quinnipiac; Quarterfinals	Canceled due to the COVID-19 pandemic		Boardwalk Hall; Atlantic City, NJ
*Non-conference game. ^{#}Rankings from AP Poll. (#) Tournament seedings in parentheses. All times are in Eastern.
