= 2019–20 Rider Broncs men's basketball team =

American college basketball season

2019–20 Rider Broncs men's basketball
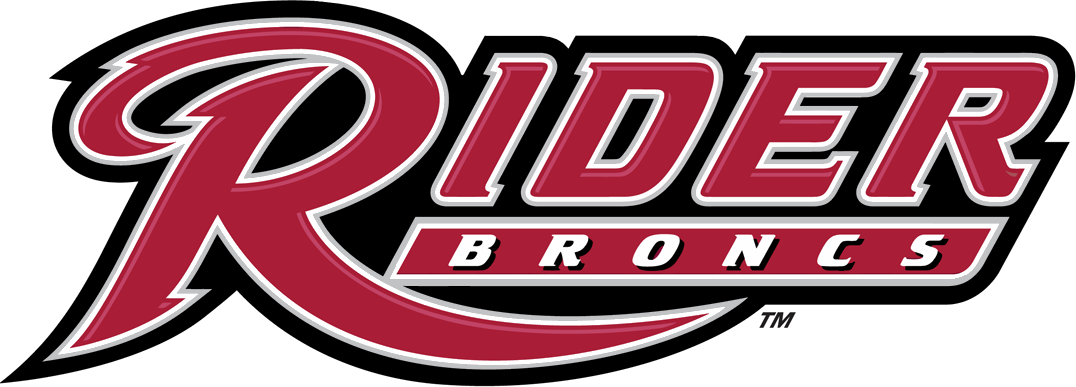

Hall of Fame Tip Off Springfield champions
- Conference: Metro Atlantic Athletic Conference
- Record: 18–12 (12–8 MAAC)
- Head coach: Kevin Baggett (8th season)
- Associate head coach: Dino Presley
- Assistant coaches: Marlon Guild; Geoff Arnold
- Home arena: Alumni Gymnasium

2019–20 MAAC men's basketball standings
	Conf.				Overall
Team	W		L	PCT	W		L	PCT
Siena	15	–	5	.750	20	–	10	.667
Saint Peter's	14	–	6	.700	18	–	12	.600
Rider	12	–	8	.600	18	–	12	.600
Monmouth	12	–	8	.600	18	–	13	.581
Quinnipiac	10	–	10	.500	15	–	15	.500
Niagara	9	–	11	.450	12	–	20	.375
Iona	9	–	11	.450	12	–	16	.429
Fairfield	8	–	12	.400	12	–	20	.375
Manhattan	8	–	12	.400	13	–	17	.433
Canisius	7	–	13	.350	12	–	20	.375
Marist	6	–	14	.300	7	–	23	.233
Note: The 2020 MAAC tournament was canceled during the quarterfinals due to the COVID-19 pandemic.

The 2019–20 Rider Broncs men's basketball team represented Rider University in the 2019–20 NCAA Division I men's basketball season. The Broncs, led by 8th-year head coach Kevin Baggett, played their home games at the Alumni Gymnasium in Lawrenceville, New Jersey as members of the Metro Atlantic Athletic Conference. They finished the season 18–12 overall, 12–8 in MAAC play to finish in a tie for third place. Before they could face #6 seeded Niagara in the MAAC tournament quarterfinals, all postseason tournaments were cancelled amid the COVID-19 pandemic.

== Previous season ==
The Broncs finished the 2018–19 season 16–15 overall, 11–7 in MAAC play to finish in a four-way tie for second place. As the 4th seed in the 2019 MAAC tournament, they were defeated by No. 5 seed Siena 81–87 in the quarterfinals.

== Roster ==
2019–20 Rider Broncs men's basketball team
Players
Coaches

Pos.	#	Name	Height	Weight	Year	Hometown
G	0	Christian Ings	6 ft 2 in (1.88 m)	176 lb (80 kg)	Fr	Philadelphia, Pennsylvania
G	2	Allen Powell	6 ft 2 in (1.88 m)	165 lb (75 kg)	Fr	Philadelphia, Pennsylvania
G	3	Khalil Turner	6 ft 7 in (2.01 m)	200 lb (91 kg)	Fr	Philadelphia, Pennsylvania
G	5	Tyrei Randall	6 ft 6 in (1.98 m)	170 lb (77 kg)	RS So	Aurora, Colorado
F	10	Ajiri Ogemuno-Johnson	6 ft 8 in (2.03 m)	210 lb (95 kg)	So	Lansdowne, Pennsylvania
G	11	Willy Nuñez, Jr.	6 ft 6 in (1.98 m)	215 lb (98 kg)	GS	Orlando, Florida
F	13	Frederick Scott	6 ft 8 in (2.03 m)	230 lb (104 kg)	Jr	Munster, Indiana
G/F	14	Dimencio Vaughn	6 ft 5 in (1.96 m)	220 lb (100 kg)	RS Jr	New York, New York
C	20	Tyere Marshall	6 ft 9 in (2.06 m)	240 lb (109 kg)	Sr	Philadelphia, Pennsylvania
F	21	Tyrel Bladen	6 ft 10 in (2.08 m)	230 lb (104 kg)	RS Fr	Coatesville, Pennsylvania
G	22	Kimar Williams	6 ft 1 in (1.85 m)	185 lb (84 kg)	RS Sr	Philadelphia, Pennsylvania
G	23	Stevie Jordan	6 ft 0 in (1.83 m)	170 lb (77 kg)	Sr	Bensalem, Pennsylvania

Head coach

- Kevin Baggett (Saint Joseph's)

Assistant coach(es)

- Dino Presley (Kutztown)
- Marlon Guild (Hartford)
- Geoff Arnold (Saint Joseph's)

Legend

- (C) Team captain
- (S) Suspended
- (I) Ineligible
- (W) Walk-on
- Injured
- Current redshirt

Roster
Last update: November 12, 2019

== Schedule and results ==
Date time, TV	Rank^{#}	Opponent^{#}	Result	Record	Site (attendance) city, state
Exhibition
November 2, 2019*; 4:00 pm		Slippery Rock	W 90–59		Alumni Gymnasium (1,650); Lawrenceville, NJ
Regular season
November 5, 2019*; 7:00 pm		at Coppin State	W 91–84	1–0	Physical Education Complex (815); Baltimore, MD
November 8, 2019*; 7:00 pm		at Delaware State	W 81–54	2–0	Memorial Hall (1,108); Dover, DE
November 17, 2019*; 6:00 pm, P12N		at Arizona State; Air Force Reserve Tip Off	L 55–92	2–1	Desert Financial Arena (7,472); Tempe, AZ
November 20, 2019*; 7:00 pm, NESN		at UMass; Air Force Reserve Tip Off	L 72–82	2–2	Mullins Center (2,378); Amherst, MA
November 23, 2019*; 5:00 pm, ESPN3		vs. Columbia; Air Force Reserve Tip Off Springfield bracket semifinal	W 87–63	3–2	Mohegan Sun Arena; Uncasville, CT
November 24, 2019*; 8:30 pm, ESPN3		vs. Vermont; Air Force Reserve Tip Off Springfield bracket championship game	W 72–67	4–2	Mohegan Sun Arena; Uncasville, CT
December 3, 2019*; 7:00 pm, ESPN+		Bucknell	W 89–67	5–2	Alumni Gymnasium (1,403); Lawrenceville, NJ
December 14, 2019*; 2:00 pm, ESPN+		LIU	W 89–74	6–2	Alumni Gymnasium (1,231); Lawrenceville, NJ
December 16, 2019; 7:00 pm, ESPN3		Marist	W 74–64	7–2 (1–0)	Alumni Gymnasium (1,207); Lawrenceville, NJ
December 21, 2019*; 1:00 pm, ESPN3		at Temple	L 66–78	7–3	Liacouras Center (5,131); Philadelphia, PA
December 31, 2019*; 7:00 pm, BTN		at Wisconsin	L 35–67	7–4	Kohl Center (16,016); Madison, WI
January 5, 2020; 2:00 pm, ESPN+		Siena	W 85–77	8–4 (2–0)	Alumni Gymnasium (1,541); Lawrenceville, NJ
January 7, 2019; 7:00 pm, ESPN+		at Quinnipiac	L 61–80	8–5 (2–1)	People's United Center (557); Hamden, CT
January 10, 2020; 7:00 pm, ESPNU		Iona	L 66–69	8–6 (2–2)	Alumni Gymnasium (1,611); Lawrenceville, NJ
January 12, 2020; 2:00 pm, ESPN+		at Marist	W 69–52	9–6 (3–2)	McCann Arena (1,175); Poughkeepsie, NY
January 17, 2020; 7:00 pm, ESPN+		at Niagara	L 68–70	9–7 (3–3)	Gallagher Center (980); Lewiston, NY
January 19, 2020; 2:00 pm, ESPN+		at Canisius	L 86–95	9–8 (3–4)	Koessler Athletic Center (1,254); Buffalo, NY
January 24, 2020; 7:00 pm, ESPN+		Saint Peter's	W 70–66	10–8 (4–4)	Alumni Gymnasium (1,514); Lawrenceville, NJ
January 26, 2020; 2:00 pm, ESPN+		at Manhattan	W 67–63	11–8 (5–4)	Draddy Gymnasium (1,248); Bronx, NY
January 31, 2020; 7:00 pm, ESPN3		Fairfield	W 68–52	12–8 (6–4)	Alumni Gymnasium (1,612); Lawrenceville, NJ
February 2, 2020; 1:00 pm, ESPN+		at Monmouth	L 84–90	12–9 (6–5)	OceanFirst Bank Center (2,067); West Long Branch, NJ
February 7, 2020; 7:00 pm, ESPN3		Canisius	W 61–60	13–9 (7–5)	Alumni Gymnasium (1,650); Lawrenceville, NJ
February 9, 2020; 2:00 pm, ESPN3		Niagara	W 73–58	14–9 (8–5)	Alumni Gymnasium (1,528); Lawrenceville, NJ
February 14, 2020; 7:00 pm, ESPN3		at Siena	L 64–73	14–10 (8–6)	Times Union Center (5,600); Albany, NY
February 16, 2020; 7:00 pm, ESPN3		Quinnipiac	W 79–63	15–10 (9–6)	Alumni Gymnasium (1,533); Lawrenceville, NJ
February 21, 2020; 7:00 pm, ESPN3		at Iona	L 69–70	15–11 (9–7)	Hynes Athletic Center (1,734); New Rochelle, NY
February 23, 2020; 2:00 pm, ESPN3		at Saint Peter's	L 54–73	15–12 (9–8)	Yanitelli Center (842); Jersey City, NJ
February 28, 2020; 7:00 pm, ESPN3		Monmouth	W 79–67	16–12 (10–8)	Alumni Gymnasium (1,650); Lawrenceville, New Jersey
March 1, 2020; 2:00 pm, ESPN+		at Fairfield	W 65–51	17–12 (11–8)	Alumni Hall (2,321); Fairfield, CT
March 4, 2020; 7:00 pm, ESPN3		Manhattan	W 71–59	18–12 (12–8)	Alumni Gymnasium (1,611); Lawrenceville, NJ
MAAC tournament
March 12, 2020; 7:00 pm, ESPN3	(3)	vs. (6) Niagara; Quarterfinals	Cancelled due to the COVID-19 pandemic		Boardwalk Hall; Atlantic City, NJ
*Non-conference game. ^{#}Rankings from AP Poll. (#) Tournament seedings in parentheses. All times are in Eastern.
