= 2019–20 Marist Red Foxes men's basketball team =

American college basketball season

2019–20 Marist Red Foxes men's basketball
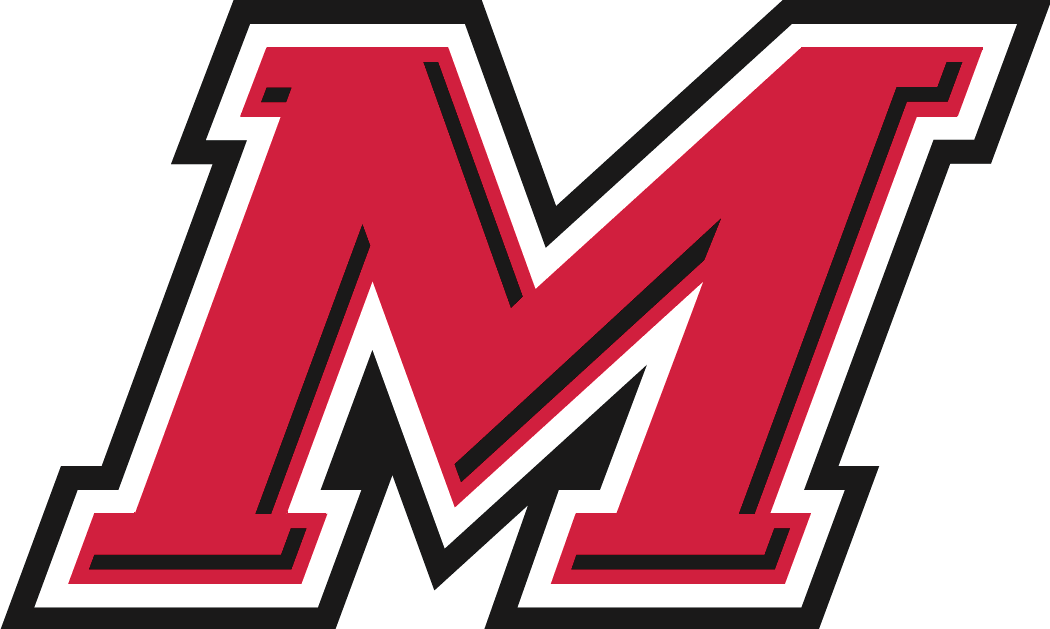
- Conference: Metro Atlantic Athletic Conference
- Record: 7–23 (6–14 MAAC)
- Head coach: John Dunne (2nd season)
- Assistant coaches: Serge Clement; Kevin Driscoll; Dalip Bhatia
- Home arena: McCann Arena

2019–20 MAAC men's basketball standings
	Conf.				Overall
Team	W		L	PCT	W		L	PCT
Siena	15	–	5	.750	20	–	10	.667
Saint Peter's	14	–	6	.700	18	–	12	.600
Rider	12	–	8	.600	18	–	12	.600
Monmouth	12	–	8	.600	18	–	13	.581
Quinnipiac	10	–	10	.500	15	–	15	.500
Niagara	9	–	11	.450	12	–	20	.375
Iona	9	–	11	.450	12	–	16	.429
Fairfield	8	–	12	.400	12	–	20	.375
Manhattan	8	–	12	.400	13	–	17	.433
Canisius	7	–	13	.350	12	–	20	.375
Marist	6	–	14	.300	7	–	23	.233
Note: The 2020 MAAC tournament was canceled during the quarterfinals due to the COVID-19 pandemic.

The 2019–20 Marist Red Foxes men's basketball team represented Marist College in the 2019–20 NCAA Division I men's basketball season. The Red Foxes, led by second-year head coach John Dunne, played their home games at the McCann Arena in Poughkeepsie, New York as members of the Metro Atlantic Athletic Conference. They finished the season 7–23, 6–14 in MAAC play to finish in last place. They lost in the first round of the MAAC tournament to Niagara 54–56.

== Previous season ==
The Marist Red Foxes finished the 2018–19 season 12–19 overall, 7–11 in MAAC play to finish in eighth place. As the No. 8 seed in the 2019 MAAC tournament, they were defeated by No. 9 seed Saint Peter's in the first round 68–71 in overtime.

== Roster ==
2019–20 Marist Red Foxes men's basketball team
Players
Coaches

Pos.	#	Name	Height	Weight	Year	Hometown
G	0	Darius Hines	5 ft 11 in (1.8 m)	160 lb (73 kg)	So	Clinton, Maryland
G	1	Matt Turner	6 ft 3 in (1.91 m)	175 lb (79 kg)	RS So	Trumbull, Connecticut
G	2	Jack Cavanaugh	6 ft 4 in (1.93 m)	180 lb (82 kg)	Fr	Sparta, New Jersey
G	4	Tyler Sagl	6 ft 5 in (1.96 m)	200 lb (91 kg)	Fr	Toronto, Canada
G	5	Michael Cubbage	6 ft 4 in (1.93 m)	180 lb (82 kg)	RS Jr	Sicklerville, New Jersey
F	10	Henry Makeny	6 ft 7 in (2.01 m)	185 lb (84 kg)	Fr	Sydney, Australia
C	11	Tobias Sjoberg	6 ft 9 in (2.06 m)	250 lb (113 kg)	Sr	Malmö, Sweden
G	13	Matt Herasme	6 ft 3 in (1.91 m)	180 lb (82 kg)	So	Chester, New York
C	14	Victor Enoh	6 ft 7 in (2.01 m)	250 lb (113 kg)	RS So	Decatur, Georgia
C	15	Jordan Jones	6 ft 8 in (2.03 m)	205 lb (93 kg)	RS Jr	Baltimore, Maryland
G	21	Tyler Saint-Furcy	6 ft 4 in (1.93 m)	180 lb (82 kg)	Fr	Inwood, New York
G	22	Ryan Carmello	5 ft 11 in (1.8 m)	160 lb (73 kg)	Jr	Latham, New York
F	24	Braden Bell	6 ft 7 in (2.01 m)	190 lb (86 kg)	So	Rowlett, Texas
G	25	Tucker Lee	6 ft 3 in (1.91 m)	180 lb (82 kg)	Jr	Kent, Connecticut
G	32	Michael Servetas	6 ft 2 in (1.88 m)	190 lb (86 kg)	Jr	Trumbull, Connecticut
F	33	Zion Tordoff	6 ft 8 in (2.03 m)	220 lb (100 kg)	Jr	Bradford, England

Head coach

- John Dunne (Ithaca)

Assistant coach(es)

- Serge Clement (SUNY Potsdam)
- Kevin Driscoll (Misericordia)
- Dalip Bhatia (Rutgers)

Legend

- (C) Team captain
- (S) Suspended
- (I) Ineligible
- (W) Walk-on
- Injured
- Current redshirt

Roster
Last update: November 17, 2019

- Jan. 4, 2020 – Sophomore guards Darius Hines and Matt Turner were dismissed after violating team rules.

== Schedule and results ==
Date time, TV	Rank^{#}	Opponent^{#}	Result	Record	High points	High rebounds	High assists	Site (attendance) city, state
Regular season
November 8, 2019*; 7:00 pm, ESPN3		at VMI	W 58–56	1–0	19 – Cubbage	7 – Tied	4 – Hines	Cameron Hall (1,246); Lexington, VA
November 12, 2019*; 7:00 pm, ESPN+		Hartford	L 51–62	1–1	13 – Tied	7 – Tordoff	3 – Hines	McCann Arena (1,018); Poughkeepsie, NY
November 16, 2019*; 7:00 pm, ESPN+		at Fordham	L 41–58	1–2	10 – Turner	6 – Jones	3 – Tied	Rose Hill Gymnasium (1,770); Bronx, NY
November 23, 2019*; 7:00 pm, ESPN+		The Citadel	L 75–79	1–3	15 – Sagl	9 – Herasme	4 – Cavanaugh	McCann Arena (1,210); Poughkeepsie, NY
November 30, 2019*; 7:00 pm, ESPN+		Army	L 64–66 ^{OT}	1–4	17 – Sagl	9 – Herasme	4 – Cubbage	McCann Arena (1,312); Poughkeepsie, NY
December 7, 2019*; 7:00 pm		at Navy	L 51–53 ^{OT}	1–5	14 – Cubbage	8 – Cubbage	2 – Tied	Alumni Hall (849); Annapolis, MD
December 16, 2019; 7:00 pm, ESPN3		at Rider	L 64–74	1–6 (0–1)	15 – Tied	6 – Tied	3 – Tordoff	Alumni Gymnasium (1,207); Lawrenceville, NJ
December 18, 2019*; 7:00 pm, ESPN+		New Hampshire	L 56–65	1–7	14 – Turner	7 – Jones	2 – Jones	McCann Arena (912); Poughkeepsie, NY
December 21, 2019*; 1:00 pm		at Bethune–Cookman	L 56–85	1–8	14 – Jones	5 – Tied	4 – Hines	Moore Gymnasium (103); Daytona Beach, FL
December 28, 2019*; 2:00 pm, ESPN+		at Columbia	L 54–69	1–9	13 – Sagl	6 – Cubbage	4 – Tied	Levien Gymnasium (1,295); New York, NY
January 3, 2020; 7:00 pm, ESPN+		Quinnipiac	L 58–63	1–10 (0–2)	20 – Herasme	6 – Cubbage	2 – Tied	McCann Arena (1,146); Poughkeepsie, NY
January 5, 2020; 5:00 pm, ESPN+		at Saint Peter's	L 40–66	1–11 (0–3)	10 – Herasme	7 – Tied	2 – 3 tied	Yanitelli Center (781); Jersey City, NJ
January 8, 2020; 7:00 pm, ESPN+		at Fairfield	W 70–58	2–11 (1–3)	17 – Saint-Furcy	8 – Cubbage	4 – Sagl	Alumni Hall (1,003); Fairfield, CT
January 12, 2020; 2:00 pm, ESPN+		Rider	L 52–69	2–12 (1–4)	9 – Bell	6 – Herasme	3 – Tied	McCann Arena (1,175); Poughkeepsie, NY
January 16, 2020; 7:00 pm, ESPN+		at Monmouth	L 66–74	2–13 (1–5)	17 – Saint-Furcy	13 – Cubbage	4 – Cubbage	OceanFirst Bank Center (1,664); West Long Branch, NJ
January 19, 2020; 2:00 pm, ESPN3		Iona	W 83–73	3–13 (2–5)	17 – Herasme	11 – Herasme	4 – Cubbage	McCann Arena (1,205); Poughkeepsie, NY
January 22, 2020; 7:00 pm, ESPN3		Manhattan	W 75–73 ^{OT}	4–13 (3–5)	23 – Sagl	9 – Cubbage	6 – Cubbage	McCann Arena (1,194); Poughkeepsie, NY
January 24, 2020; 7:00 pm, ESPN+		at Siena	L 57–70	4–14 (3–6)	17 – Sagl	8 – Herasme	2 – Cubbage	Times Union Center (6,693); Albany, NY
January 31, 2020; 7:00 pm, ESPN3		at Niagara	W 67–48	5–14 (4–6)	18 – Jones	11 – Cubbage	6 – Cubbage	Gallagher Center (1,006); Lewiston, NY
February 2, 2020; 2:00 pm, ESPN+		at Canisius	L 65–66	5–15 (4–7)	16 – Cubbage	7 – Cubbage	8 – Cubbage	Koessler Athletic Center (969); Buffalo, NY
February 7, 2020; 7:00 pm, ESPN3		Saint Peter's	W 72–61	6–15 (5–7)	18 – Jones	8 – Herasme	8 – Cubbage	McCann Arena (1,165); Poughkeepsie, NY
February 14, 2020; 7:00 pm, ESPN3		Fairfield	L 53–57 ^{OT}	6–16 (5–8)	11 – Tied	9 – Cubbage	2 – 3 tied	McCann Arena (1,100); Poughkeepsie, NY
February 16, 2020; 1:00 pm, ESPN+		at Iona	L 70–78	6–17 (5–9)	20 – Saint-Furcy	6 – Bell	4 – Cubbage	Hynes Athletic Center (1,372); New Rochelle, NY
February 21, 2020; 7:00 pm, ESPN3		Monmouth	L 61–65 ^{OT}	6–18 (5–10)	16 – Sagl	8 – Tied	5 – Cubbage	McCann Arena (1,235); Poughkeepsie, NY
February 23, 2020; 2:00 pm, ESPN+		Niagara	W 76–54	7–18 (6–10)	18 – Tied	6 – 3 tied	5 – Tied	McCann Arena (1,549); Poughkeepsie, NY
February 26, 2020; 7:00 pm, ESPN+		at Manhattan	L 56–65	7–19 (6–11)	20 – Bell	9 – Cubbage	7 – Cubbage	Draddy Gymnasium (923); Bronx, NY
February 28, 2020; 7:00 pm, ESPN3		Siena	L 50–52	7–20 (6–12)	12 – Sjoberg	7 – Bell	3 – Cubbage	McCann Arena (1,705); Poughkeepsie, NY
March 1, 2020; 2:00 pm, ESPN3		at Quinnipiac	L 52–71	7–21 (6–13)	11 – Bell	8 – Bell	3 – Cubbage	People's United Center (1,724); Hamden, CT
March 4, 2020; 7:00 pm, ESPN3		Canisius	L 69–85	7–22 (6–14)	19 – Jones	6 – Tied	3 – Cubbage	McCann Arena (1,124); Poughkeepsie, NY
MAAC tournament
March 10, 2020; 10:15 pm, ESPN3	(11)	vs. (6) Niagara; First round	L 54–56	7–23	11 – Tied	9 – Cubbage	6 – Cubbage	Boardwalk Hall (878); Atlantic City, NJ
*Non-conference game. ^{#}Rankings from AP Poll. (#) Tournament seedings in parentheses. All times are in Eastern.
