= 2019–20 Metro Atlantic Athletic Conference men's basketball season =

- League: NCAA Division I
- Sport: Basketball
- Duration: November 1, 2019–March 11, 2020
- Teams: 11

2019–20 NCAA Division I men's basketball season
- Season champions: Siena Saints
- Runners-up: Saint Peter's Peacocks
- Top scorer: E.J. Crawford (Iona) 18.8

Tournament

Metro Atlantic Athletic Conference men's basketball seasons
- ← 2018–19 2020–21 →

2019–20 MAAC men's basketball standings
	Conf.				Overall
Team	W		L	PCT	W		L	PCT
Siena	15	–	5	.750	20	–	10	.667
Saint Peter's	14	–	6	.700	18	–	12	.600
Rider	12	–	8	.600	18	–	12	.600
Monmouth	12	–	8	.600	18	–	13	.581
Quinnipiac	10	–	10	.500	15	–	15	.500
Niagara	9	–	11	.450	12	–	20	.375
Iona	9	–	11	.450	12	–	16	.429
Fairfield	8	–	12	.400	12	–	20	.375
Manhattan	8	–	12	.400	13	–	17	.433
Canisius	7	–	13	.350	12	–	20	.375
Marist	6	–	14	.300	7	–	23	.233
Note: The 2020 MAAC tournament was canceled during the quarterfinals due to the COVID-19 pandemic.

The 2019–20 Metro Atlantic Athletic Conference (MAAC) men's basketball season began with practices in October 2019, followed by the start of the 2019–20 NCAA Division I men's basketball season on November 1. Conference play started in January and concluded March 11, 2020 due to the COVID-19 pandemic. This season was the 39th season of MAAC basketball.

In a most unpredictable season, all 11 teams had an equal shot at being the top team in the MAAC, but at the end, only one could emerge. The regular season crown came down to the final day. Siena, picked sixth, controlled their own destiny, beat Monmouth and clinched their first outright MAAC regular season championship in almost a decade. Siena would put the game away early and cruise to an 86–72 victory, clinching the MAAC regular season championship and the #1 seed in the 2020 MAAC tournament. Upstart Saint Peter's, picked ninth, would finish one game behind Siena, so close to their first conference championship since 1987. Iona, who was the preseason favorite in the MAAC, was without their coach Tim Cluess, who missed the entire 2019–20 season with an undisclosed illness, and finished in sixth place. It was their lowest finish in the standings since finishing seventh in 2008–2009.

The 2020 MAAC tournament was held on March 10 and March 11 at the Jim Whelan Boardwalk Hall in Atlantic City, New Jersey. The 2020 MAAC Basketball Championship moved to the historic Boardwalk Hall for the first time in MAAC history. However, after the two quarterfinal games on March 11, the other two quarterfinal games, semifinals and finals were cancelled amid the COVID-19 pandemic. Siena, who was the #1 seed, and who had won their quarterfinal game, would have been the MAAC's automatic bid to the NCAA tournament should it have been held. On March 12, the tournament, as well as all other NCAA championships for the remainder of the academic season, were cancelled due to the COVID-19 pandemic. It was the first time the tournament had been cancelled since its creation in 1939.

== Head coaches ==
=== Coaching changes ===
On March 11, 2019, Fairfield head coach Sydney Johnson was fired. He finished at Fairfield with an eight-year record of 116–147. On April 3, Rutgers assistant Jay Young was announced as Johnson's replacement.

On March 11, 2019, Niagara head coach Chris Casey was fired. He finished at Niagara with a six-year record of 64–129. On March 28, 2019, Niagara hired Patrick Beilein as their new head coach. On October 24, it was announced that Beilein would be stepping down from his job, citing personal reasons. That same day, assistant coach Greg Paulus was announced as interim head coach.

On March 21, 2019, it was announced that Siena head coach Jamion Christian would be accepting the head coaching position at George Washington. On March 25, it was announced that assistant coach Carmen Maciariello would be named as Christian's successor.

=== Coaches ===
Team	Head coach	Previous job	Year at school	Overall record	MAAC record	MAAC Tournament championships
Canisius	Reggie Witherspoon	Chattanooga (asst.)	4	54–45	36–20	0
Fairfield	Jay Young	Rutgers (asst.)	1	0–0	0–0	0
Iona	Tim Cluess	LIU Post	10	199–108	124–46	5
Manhattan	Steve Masiello	Louisville (asst.)	9	127–131	80–72	2
Marist	John Dunne	Saint Peter's	2	12–19	7–11	1
Monmouth	King Rice	Vanderbilt (asst.)	9	131–133	70–46	0
Niagara	Greg Paulus	George Washington (asst.)	1	0–0	0–0	0
Quinnipiac	Baker Dunleavy	Villanova (asst.)	3	28–36	18–18	0
Rider	Kevin Baggett	Rider (assoc. HC)	8	123–104	80–54	0
Saint Peter's	Shaheen Holloway	Seton Hall (asst.)	2	10–22	6–12	0
Siena	Carmen Maciariello	Siena (asst.)	1	0–0	0–0	0

Notes:

- All records, appearances, titles, etc. are from time with current school only.
- Year at school includes 2019–20 season.
- Overall and MAAC records are from time at current school and are before the beginning of the season.
- Previous jobs are head coaching jobs unless otherwise noted.

== Preseason ==
=== Preseason Coaches Poll ===
Rank	Team
1.	Iona (10)
2.	Rider (1)
3.	Quinnipiac
4.	Monmouth
5.	Manhattan
6.	Siena
7.	Canisius
8.	Marist
9.	Saint Peter's
10.	Niagara
11.	Fairfield

() first place votes

=== Preseason All-MAAC teams ===
2019-20 MAAC Men's Basketball Preseason All-MAAC Teams
First Team	Second Team	Third Team
Tajuan Agee – Iona; †E.J. Crawford – Iona; Stevie Jordan – Rider; Rich Kelly – Quinnipiac; Jalen Pickett – Siena	Asante Gist – Iona; Deion Hammond – Monmouth; Malik Johnson – Canisius; Ray Salnave – Monmouth; Frederick Scott – Rider; Dimencio Vaughn – Rider	Jesus Cruz – Fairfield; Tyere Marshall – Rider; Pauly Paulicap – Manhattan; Jacob Rigoni – Quinnipiac; Landon Taliaferro – Fairfield; Warren Williams – Manhattan

† denotes unanimous selection

=== Preseason Player of the Year ===
Recipient	School
Jalen Pickett	Siena

== MAAC Regular Season ==
=== Conference Matrix ===
This table summarizes the final head-to-head results between teams in conference play during the regular season.

	Canisius	Fairfield	Iona	Manhattan	Marist	Monmouth	Niagara	Quinnipiac	Rider	Saint Peter's	Siena
vs. Canisius		2–0	2–0	1–1	0–2	2–0	1–1	2–0	1–1	1–1	1–1
vs. Fairfield	0–2		2–0	0–2	1–1	1–1	1–1	2–0	2–0	1–1	2–0
vs. Iona	0–2	0–2		1–1	1–1	2–0	2–0	1–1	0–2	2–0	2–0
vs. Manhattan	1–1	2–0	1–1		1–1	2–0	0–2	0–2	2–0	2–0	1–1
vs. Marist	2–0	1–1	1–1	1–1		2–0	0–2	2–0	2–0	1–1	2–0
vs. Monmouth	0–2	1–1	0–2	0–2	0–2		1–1	1–1	1–1	2–0	2–0
vs. Niagara	1–1	1–1	0–2	2–0	2–0	1–1		1–1	1–1	1–1	1–1
vs. Quinnipiac	0–2	0–2	1–1	2–0	0–2	1–1	1–1		1–1	2–0	2–0
vs. Rider	1–1	0–2	2–0	0–2	0–2	1–1	1–1	1–1		1–1	1–1
vs. Saint Peter's	1–1	1–1	0–2	0–2	1–1	0–2	1–1	0–2	1–1		1–1
vs. Siena	1–1	0–2	0–2	1–1	0–2	0–2	1–1	0–2	1–1	1–1	
Total	7–13	8–12	9–11	8–12	6–14	12–8	9–11	10–10	12–8	14–6	15–5

=== Player of the week ===
Throughout the regular season, the Metro Atlantic Athletic Conference offices named player(s) of the week and rookie(s) of the week.

Week	Player of the week	Rookie of the week
November 11, 2019	Frederick Scott, Rider	Tyler Saint-Furcy, Marist
November 18, 2019	Malik Johnson, Canisius	Jacco Fritz, Canisius
November 25, 2019	Tyere Marshall, Rider	Jacco Fritz (2), Canisius
December 2, 2019	Landon Taliaferro, Fairfield	Jacco Fritz (3), Canisius
December 9, 2019	Rich Kelly, Quinnipiac	Gary Harris, Jr., Siena
December 16, 2019	Ray Salnave, Monmouth	Fousseyni Drame, Saint Peter's
December 23, 2019	Elijah Burns, Siena	Hassan Drame, Saint Peter's
December 30, 2019	Jalen Pickett, Siena	Armon Harried, Canisius
January 6, 2020	Tykei Greene, Manhattan	Daryl Banks III, Saint Peter's
January 13, 2020	Kevin Marfo, Quinnipiac	Armon Harried (2), Canisius
January 20, 2020	Malik Johnson (2), Canisius	Hassan Drame (2), Saint Peter's
January 27, 2020	Jalen Pickett (2), Siena	Tyler Sagl, Marist
February 3, 2020	Dimencio Vaughn, Rider	Aaron Estrada, Saint Peter's
February 10, 2020	E.J. Crawford, Iona	Fousseyni Drame (2), Saint Peter's
February 17, 2020	Marcus Hammond, Niagara	Aaron Estrada (2), Saint Peter's
February 24, 2020	Jalen Pickett (3), Siena	Doug Edert, Saint Peter's
March 2, 2020	Marcus Hammond (2), Niagara	Aaron Estrada (3), Saint Peter's
March 8, 2020	Elijah Burns (2), Siena	Fousseyni Drame (3), Saint Peter's

=== Records against other conferences ===
2019–20 records against non-conference foes. Records shown for regular season only.

Power 7 Conferences	Record
American	0–3
ACC	0–4
Big East	0–3
Big Ten	0–3
Big 12	0–2
Pac-12	0–2
SEC	–––
Power 7 Total	0–17
Other NCAA Division I Conferences	Record
America East	6–5
A-10	3–7
ASUN	3–1
Big Sky	–––
Big South	2–1
Big West	0–1
CAA	1–6
C-USA	0–1
Horizon League	2–0
Ivy League	2–6
MAC	1–4
MEAC	5–1
MVC	–––
Mountain West	–––
NEC	5–5
OVC	–––
Patriot League	8–3
Pacific West	–––
SoCon	2–2
Southland	0–1
SWAC	–––
The Summit	0–1
Sun Belt	–––
WAC	–––
WCC	–––
Other Division I Total	40–45
NCAA Division I Total	40–62

== Postseason ==
=== MAAC Tournament ===
- 2020 Metro Atlantic Athletic Conference Basketball Tournament, Jim Whelan Boardwalk Hall, Atlantic City, New Jersey
- Tournament was canceled before the games of March 12 began due to COVID-19.

First Round; Tuesday, March 10; ESPN3
8	Fairfield	43
9	Manhattan	61
7	Iona	70
10	Canisius	60
6	Niagara	56
11	Marist	54

Quarterfinals; Wednesday/Thursday, March 11/12; ESPN3
1	Siena	63
9	Manhattan	49
4	Monmouth
5	Quinnipiac
2	Saint Peter’s	56
7	Iona	54
3	Rider
6	Niagara

Semifinals; Friday, March 13; ESPNews
1	Siena
2	Saint Peter's

Championship; Saturday, March 14; ESPNU

* denotes number of overtimes

== Honors and awards ==
=== MAAC Awards ===
2019-20 MAAC Men's Basketball Major Individual Awards
Award	Recipient(s)
Player of the Year	Jalen Pickett, So, G, Siena
Coach of the Year	Shaheen Holloway, Saint Peter's
Rookie of the Year	†Aaron Estrada, Fr, G, Saint Peter's
Defensive Player of the Year	KC Ndefo, So, G, Saint Peter's
Sixth Player of the Year	KC Ndefo, So, G, Saint Peter's

2019-20 MAAC Men's Basketball All-Conference Teams
First Team	Second Team	Third Team	Rookie Team
E.J. Crawford, Sr, G/F, Iona; Deion Hammond, Jr, G, Monmouth; Marcus Hammond, So, G, Niagara; Dimencio Vaughn, Jr, G, Rider; Manny Camper, Jr, G, Siena; †Jalen Pickett, So, G, Siena	Tajuan Agee, Sr, F, Iona; Ray Salnave, Jr, G, Monmouth; Rich Kelly, Jr, G, Quinnipiac; Kevin Marfo, Sr, F, Quinnipiac; Elijah Burns, Sr, F, Siena	Malik Johnson, Sr, G, Canisius; Pauly Paulicap, Sr, F, Manhattan; Tyere Marshall, Sr, C, Rider; Frederick Scott, So, F, Rider; Aaron Estrada, Fr, G, Saint Peter's; KC Ndefo, So, G, Saint Peter's	Jacco Fritz, Fr, F, Canisius; Chris Maidoh, Fr, F, Fairfield; Tyler Sagl, Fr, G, Marist; Darryl Banks III, Fr, G, Saint Peter's; Doug Edert, Fr, G, Saint Peter's; †Aaron Estrada, Fr, G, Saint Peter's

† denotes unanimous selection

== 2019–20 Season final statistic leaders ==
Scoring leaders
Rk	Player	PTS	PPG
1	E.J. Crawford (Iona)	525	18.8
2	Rich Kelly (Quinnipiac)	500	16.7
3	Deion Hammond (Monmouth)	506	16.3
4	Jalen Pickett (Siena)	438	15.1
5	Dimencio Vaughn (Rider)	443	14.8

Rebound leaders
Rk	Player	REB	RPG
1	Kevin Marfo (Quinnipiac)	400	13.3
2	Manny Camper (Siena)	311	10.4
3	Tyere Marshall (Rider)	233	8.0
4	Tajuan Agee (Iona)	210	7.2
5	Pauly Paulicap (Manhattan)	205	6.6

Assist leaders
Rk	Player	AST	APG
1	Jalen Pickett (Siena)	175	6.0
2	Malik Johnson (Canisius)	189	5.9
3	Rich Kelly (Quinnipiac)	134	4.5
4	Stevie Jordan (Rider)	122	4.1
5	Isaiah Washington (Iona)	112	4.0

Block leaders
Rk	Player	BLK	BPG
1	KC Nedefo (Saint Peter's)	67	2.4
2	Pauly Paulicap (Manhattan)	59	1.9
3	Seth Pinkney (Quinnipiac)	43	1.4
4	Kevin Marfo (Quinnipiac)	37	1.2
5	Tajuan Agee (Iona)	36	1.2

Steal leaders
Rk	Player	STL	SPG
1	Malik Johnson (Canisius)	64	2.0
2	Dimencio Vaughn (Rider)	54	1.8
3	Isaiah Washington (Iona)	48	1.7
4	Christian Hinckson (Monmouth)	47	1.5
5	Ray Salnave (Monmouth)	45	1.5

Three point leaders
Rk	Player	3P	3PA	%
1	Matthew Lee (Saint Peter's)	27	59	.458
2	Doug Edert (Saint Peter's)	53	120	.442
3	Marcus Hammond (Niagara)	74	174	.425
4	Justin Roberts(Niagara)	54	127	.425
5	Jacob Rigoni (Quinnipiac)	66	163	.405
