= 2020 MAAC men's basketball tournament =

- Classification: Division I
- Season: 2019–20
- Teams: 11
- Site: Jim Whelan Boardwalk Hall; Atlantic City, New Jersey
- Television: ESPNews, ESPNU, ESPN3

2019–20 MAAC men's basketball standings
	Conf.				Overall
Team	W		L	PCT	W		L	PCT
Siena	15	–	5	.750	20	–	10	.667
Saint Peter's	14	–	6	.700	18	–	12	.600
Rider	12	–	8	.600	18	–	12	.600
Monmouth	12	–	8	.600	18	–	13	.581
Quinnipiac	10	–	10	.500	15	–	15	.500
Niagara	9	–	11	.450	12	–	20	.375
Iona	9	–	11	.450	12	–	16	.429
Fairfield	8	–	12	.400	12	–	20	.375
Manhattan	8	–	12	.400	13	–	17	.433
Canisius	7	–	13	.350	12	–	20	.375
Marist	6	–	14	.300	7	–	23	.233
Note: The 2020 MAAC tournament was canceled during the quarterfinals due to the COVID-19 pandemic.

The 2020 Metro Atlantic Athletic Conference men's basketball tournament was the postseason men's basketball tournament for the Metro Atlantic Athletic Conference for the 2019–20 NCAA Division I men's basketball season, played at the Jim Whelan Boardwalk Hall in Atlantic City, New Jersey for the first time in MAAC history. The tournament was cancelled on March 12, 2020 due to the COVID-19 pandemic. Already underway at the time of the announcement, the tournament was stalled in the midst of the quarterfinals, with Siena and St. Peter's having already qualified for the semifinals. This would have given the Saints their first NCAA Tournament Bid since 2010, when they won three straight MAAC Tournaments. However, the NCAA cancelled the tournament later in the day.

The defending champions were the Iona Gaels.

== Seeds ==
All 11 teams in the conference participate in the Tournament. The top five teams received byes to the quarterfinals. Teams were seeded by record within the conference, with a tiebreaker system to seed teams with identical conference records.

Seed	School	Conference	Tiebreaker 1	Tiebreaker 2
1	Siena	15–5		
2	Saint Peter's	14–6		
3	Rider	12–8	1–1 vs. Monmouth	1–1 vs. Siena
4	Monmouth	12–8	1–1 vs. Rider	0–2 vs. Siena
5	Quinnipiac	10–10		
6	Niagara	9–11	2–0 vs. Iona	
7	Iona	9–11	0–2 vs. Niagara	
8	Fairfield	8–12	2–0 vs. Manhattan	
9	Manhattan	8–12	0–2 vs. Fairfield	
10	Canisius	7–13		
11	Marist	6–14		

== Schedule ==
Session	Game	Time*	Matchup	Score	Attendance	Television
First Round – Tuesday, March 10
1	1	5:00 pm	No. 8 Fairfield vs. No. 9 Manhattan	43–61	878	ESPN3
1	2	7:00 pm	No. 7 Iona vs. No. 10 Canisius	70–60	878	ESPN3
1	3	9:00 pm	No. 6 Niagara vs. No. 11 Marist	56–54	878	ESPN3
Quarterfinals – Wednesday, March 11
2	4	7:00 pm	No. 1 Siena vs. No. 9 Manhattan	63–49		ESPN3
2	5	9:30 pm	No. 2 Saint Peter's vs. No. 7 Iona	56–54		ESPN3
Quarterfinals – Thursday, March 12
3	6	7:00 pm	No. 3 Rider vs. No. 6 Niagara			ESPN3
3	7	9:30 pm	No. 4 Monmouth vs. No. 5 Quinnipiac			ESPN3
Semifinals – Friday, March 13
4	8	6:00 pm	No. 1 Siena vs. Game 7 Winner			ESPNews
4	9	8:30 pm	No. 2 Saint Peter's vs. Game 6 Winner			ESPNews
Championship – Saturday, March 14
5	10	4:00 pm	Game 8 Winner vs. Game 9 Winner			ESPNU
*Game times in ET. ()-Rankings denote tournament seeding.

== Bracket ==
First round Tuesday, March 10; ESPN3
8	Fairfield	43
9	Manhattan	61
7	Iona	70
10	Canisius	60
6	Niagara	56
11	Marist	54

Quarterfinals; Wednesday/Thursday, March 11/12; ESPN3
1	Siena	63
9	Manhattan	49
4	Monmouth
5	Quinnipiac
2	Saint Peter’s	56
7	Iona	54
3	Rider
6	Niagara

Semifinals; Friday, March 13; ESPNews
1	Siena
2	Saint Peter's

Championship; Saturday, March 14; ESPNU

* denotes number of overtimes

== Game summaries ==
=== First round ===
ESPN3

March 10, 2020
5:00 pm

Recap

No. 8 Fairfield 43, No. 9 Manhattan 61
Scoring by half: 19–19, 24–42
Pts: Benning – 10; Rebs: Methnani – 6 Asts: Maidoh & Benning – 2 Benning – 5 reb	Pts: Paulicap – 18; Rebs: Paulicap – 12; Asts: Stewart – 6 Stewart – 11 pts

Jim Whelan Boardwalk Hall
Atlantic City, NJ
Attendance: 878
Referees: Ron Tyburski, Andy O'Brien, Matt Palumb

ESPN3

March 10, 2020
7:30 pm

Recap

No. 7 Iona 70, No. 10 Canisius 60
Scoring by half: 36–32, 34–28
Pts: Crawford – 25; Rebs: Crawford & Agee – 7 Asts: Washington – 3 Washington – 24 pts, 6 reb	Pts: Brown – 16; Rebs: Brown – 9 Asts: Johnson – 6 Johnson – 13 pts, 4 reb

Jim Whelan Boardwalk Hall
Atlantic City, NJ
Attendance: 878
Referees: Mike Kitts, John Floyd, Adam Vandenburgh

ESPN3

March 10, 2020
10:15 pm

Recap

No. 6 Niagara 56, No. 11 Marist 54
Scoring by half: 31–30, 25–24
Pts: Hammond – 20; Rebs: Brown – 7 Asts: Brown – 4 Solomon – 14 pts, 3 stl	Pts: Jones & Saint-Furcy – 11; Rebs: Cubbage – 9 Asts: Cubbage – 6 Cubbaged – 10 pts

Jim Whelan Boardwalk Hall
Atlantic City, NJ
Attendance: 878
Referees: Kevin O'Connell, Kevin Ferguson, King Whetstone

=== Quarterfinals ===
ESPN3

March 11, 2020
7:00 pm

Recap

No. 1 Siena 63, No. 9 Manhattan 49
Scoring by half: 34–25, 29–24
Pts: Camper – 15; Rebs: Camper – 9 Asts: Pickett – 7 Friday IV – 12 pts, 6 reb	Pts: Paulicap – 12; Rebs: Paulicap – 12; Asts: Buchanan – 3 Hinckson – 9 pts, 6 reb

Jim Whelan Boardwalk Hall
Atlantic City, NJ
Attendance: 1,234
Referees: Andy O'Brien, Michael Palau, Mike Kitts, Jr.

ESPN3

March 11, 2020
9:30 pm

Recap

No. 2 Saint Peter's 56, No. 7 Iona 54
Scoring by half: 22–18, 34–36
Pts: Taylor – 13; Rebs: Taylor – 11; Asts: Ndefo – 2 Estrada – 11 pts, 2 stl	Pts: Agee – 20; Rebs: Washington – 10; Asts: Perez – 3 Washington – 16 pts, 3 stl

Jim Whelan Boardwalk Hall
Atlantic City, NJ
Referees: Ron Tyburski, Edwin Young, Jason Mirabito

== See also ==
- 2020 MAAC women's basketball tournament
