= 2019–20 Quinnipiac Bobcats men's basketball team =

American college basketball season

2019–20 Quinnipiac Bobcats men's basketball
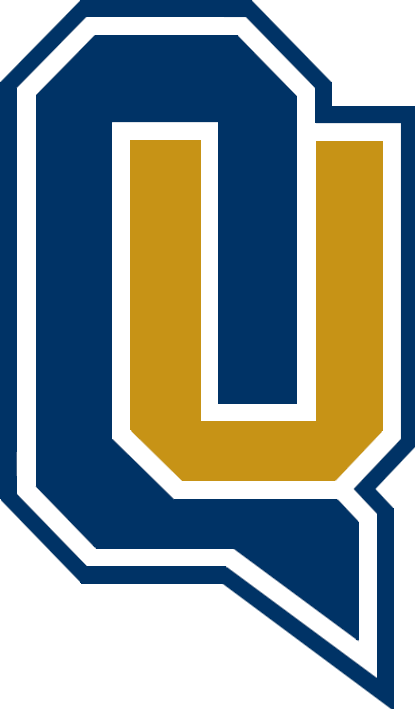
- Conference: Metro Atlantic Athletic Conference
- Record: 15–15 (10–10 MAAC)
- Head coach: Baker Dunleavy (3rd season)
- Associate head coach: Tom Pecora
- Assistant coaches: Shaun Morris; Dwayne Lee
- Home arena: People's United Center

2019–20 MAAC men's basketball standings
	Conf.				Overall
Team	W		L	PCT	W		L	PCT
Siena	15	–	5	.750	20	–	10	.667
Saint Peter's	14	–	6	.700	18	–	12	.600
Rider	12	–	8	.600	18	–	12	.600
Monmouth	12	–	8	.600	18	–	13	.581
Quinnipiac	10	–	10	.500	15	–	15	.500
Niagara	9	–	11	.450	12	–	20	.375
Iona	9	–	11	.450	12	–	16	.429
Fairfield	8	–	12	.400	12	–	20	.375
Manhattan	8	–	12	.400	13	–	17	.433
Canisius	7	–	13	.350	12	–	20	.375
Marist	6	–	14	.300	7	–	23	.233
Note: The 2020 MAAC tournament was canceled during the quarterfinals due to the COVID-19 pandemic.

The 2019–20 Quinnipiac Bobcats men's basketball team represented Quinnipiac University in the 2019–20 NCAA Division I men's basketball season. The Bobcats, led by third-year head coach Baker Dunleavy, played their home games at People's United Center in Hamden, Connecticut as members of the Metro Atlantic Athletic Conference. They finished the season 15–15 overall, 10–10 in MAAC play, to finish in fifth place. Before they could face #4 seeded Monmouth in the MAAC tournament quarterfinals, all postseason tournaments were cancelled amid the COVID-19 pandemic.

== Previous season ==
The Bobcats finished the 2018–19 season 16–15 overall, 11–7 in MAAC play, to finish in a four-way tie for second place. As the No. 3 seed in the 2019 MAAC tournament, they were defeated by No. 6 seed Monmouth 92–98 in the quarterfinals. They accepted an invitation to the CIT, where they played NJIT in the opening round, losing 81–92.

== Roster ==
2019–20 Quinnipiac Bobcats men's basketball team
Players
Coaches

Pos.	#	Name	Height	Weight	Year	Hometown
G	2	Matt Balanc	6 ft 3 in (1.91 m)	175 lb (79 kg)	RS Fr	Silver Spring, Maryland
G	3	Savion Lewis	6 ft 1 in (1.85 m)	160 lb (73 kg)	RS Fr	Dix Hills, New York
C	4	Seth Pinkney	7 ft 1 in (2.16 m)	200 lb (91 kg)	Fr	Warminster, Pennsylvania
G	5	Tyrese Williams	6 ft 3 in (1.91 m)	185 lb (84 kg)	So	Beacon, New York
G	10	Tyree Pickron	6 ft 3 in (1.91 m)	180 lb (82 kg)	So	Philadelphia, Pennsylvania
G	11	Brendan Martin	5 ft 7 in (1.7 m)	150 lb (68 kg)	So	South Setauket, New York
F	13	Aaron Falzon	6 ft 8 in (2.03 m)	225 lb (102 kg)	GS	Newton, Massachusetts
F	20	Brendan McGuire	6 ft 7 in (2.01 m)	190 lb (86 kg)	Fr	Mineola, New York
F	21	Nathan Davis	6 ft 7 in (2.01 m)	200 lb (91 kg)	RS So	Denver, Colorado
G	22	Rich Kelly	6 ft 1 in (1.85 m)	175 lb (79 kg)	Jr	Shelton, Connecticut
F	23	Jamil Riggins	6 ft 6 in (1.98 m)	190 lb (86 kg)	Fr	Philadelphia, Pennsylvania
F	25	Jacob Rigoni	6 ft 6 in (1.98 m)	190 lb (86 kg)	Jr	Adelaide, Australia
G	32	Jack Higgins	6 ft 1 in (1.85 m)	170 lb (77 kg)	RS So	Rumson, New Jersey
F	45	Kevin Marfo	6 ft 8 in (2.03 m)	245 lb (111 kg)	RS Jr	Bergenfield, New Jersey

Head coach

- Baker Dunleavy (Villanova)

Assistant coach(es)

- Tom Pecora (Adelphi)
- Shaun Morris (Lycoming)
- Dwayne Lee (Saint Joseph's)

Legend

- (C) Team captain
- (S) Suspended
- (I) Ineligible
- (W) Walk-on
- Injured
- Current redshirt

Roster
Last update: November 22, 2019

== Schedule and results ==
Date time, TV	Rank^{#}	Opponent^{#}	Result	Record	Site (attendance) city, state
Non-conference regular season
November 13, 2019*; 7:00 pm, ESPN+		at Brown	L 68–70	0–1	Pizzitola Sports Center (704); Providence, RI
November 16, 2019*; 2:00 pm, ACCNX		at Miami (FL)	L 52–80	0–2	Watsco Center (4,882); Coral Gables, FL
November 22, 2019*; 7:30 pm, ESPN+		Albany; Bobcats Invitational	W 86–69	1–2	People's United Center (890); Hamden, CT
November 23, 2019*; 6:30 pm, ESPN+		Presbyterian; Bobcats Invitational	W 73–64	2–2	People's United Center (872); Hamden, CT
November 24, 2019*; 3:30 pm, ESPN+		Sacred Heart; Bobcats Invitational	L 80–97	2–3	People's United Center (883); Hamden, CT
December 3, 2019*; 7:00 pm, NEC Front Row		at Fairleigh Dickinson	L 77–78	2–4	Rothman Center (652); Hackensack, NJ
December 7, 2019*; 5:00 pm, ESPN+		New Hampshire	W 75–67	3–4	People's United Center (1,115); Hamden, CT
December 15, 2019*; 1:00 pm, ESPN3		at Maine	W 81–61	4–4	Cross Insurance Center (988); Bangor, ME
December 20, 2019*; 4:30 pm		vs. Drexel; Boardwalk Battle	L 63–72	4–5	Boardwalk Hall (500); Atlantic City, NJ
December 21, 2019*; 2:00 pm		vs. Bowling Green	W 69–64	5–5	Boardwalk Hall (500); Atlantic City, NJ
MAAC regular season
January 3, 2020; 7:00 pm, ESPN+		at Marist	W 63–58	6–5 (1–0)	McCann Arena (1,146); Poughkeepsie, NY
January 7, 2020; 7:00 pm, ESPN+		Rider	W 80–61	7–5 (2–0)	People's United Center (557); Hamden, CT
January 10, 2020; 7:00 pm, ESPN3		Niagara	W 67–56	8–5 (3–0)	People's United Center (912); Hamden, CT
January 12, 2020; 2:00 pm, ESPN3		Monmouth	W 84–70	9–5 (4–0)	People's United Center (903); Hamden, CT
January 16, 2020; 7:00 pm, ESPN+		at Manhattan	L 57–69	9–6 (4–1)	Draddy Gymnasium (1,005); Riverdale, NY
January 18, 2020; 4:30 pm, ESPN+		Saint Peter's	L 51–71	9–7 (4–2)	People's United Center (887); Hamden, CT
January 24, 2020; 7:00 pm, ESPN+		Fairfield	W 81–67	10–7 (5–2)	People's United Center (1,989); Hamden, CT
January 26, 2020; 2:00 pm, ESPN3		at Siena	L 61–84	10–8 (5–3)	Times Union Center (6,752); Albany, NY
January 31, 2020; 7:00 pm, ESPN+		at Canisius	W 90–73	11–8 (6–3)	Koessler Athletic Center (1,201); Buffalo, NY
February 2, 2020; 1:00 pm, ESPN+		at Niagara	L 59–75	11–9 (6–4)	Gallagher Center (935); Lewiston, NY
February 7, 2020; 7:30 pm, ESPN3		Iona	L 52–73	11–10 (6–5)	People's United Center (2,257); Hamden, CT
February 9, 2020; 2:00 pm, ESPN3		Manhattan	L 63–65	11–11 (6–6)	People's United Center (1,322); Hamden, CT
February 14, 2020; 7:00 pm, ESPN3		at Saint Peter's	L 72–84	11–12 (6–7)	Yanitelli Center (541); Jersey City, NJ
February 16, 2020; 4:00 pm, ESPN3		at Rider	L 63–79	11–13 (6–8)	Alumni Gymnasium (1,533); Lawrenceville, NJ
February 21, 2020; 7:00 pm, ESPNU		Canisius	W 66–64	12–13 (7–8)	People's United Center (2,512); Hamden, CT
February 23, 2020; 2:00 pm, ESPN+		at Monmouth	L 78–89	12–14 (7–9)	OceanFirst Bank Center (2,476); West Long Branch, NJ
February 26, 2020; 7:00 pm, ESPN+		Siena	L 77–84	12–15 (7–10)	People's United Center (824); Hamden, CT
February 28, 2020; 7:00 pm, ESPN3		at Fairfield	W 60–58	13–15 (8–10)	Alumni Hall (1,921); Fairfield, CT
March 1, 2020; 2:00 pm, ESPN3		Marist	W 71–52	14–15 (9–10)	People's United Center (1,724); Hamden, CT
March 4, 2020; 7:00 pm, ESPN+		at Iona	W 69–68	15–15 (10–10)	Hynes Athletic Center (1,592); New Rochelle, NY
MAAC tournament
March 12, 2020; 9:30 pm, ESPN3	(5)	vs. (4) Monmouth; Quarterfinals	Canceled due to the COVID-19 pandemic		Boardwalk Hall; Atlantic City, NJ
*Non-conference game. ^{#}Rankings from AP poll. (#) Tournament seedings in parentheses. All times are in Eastern.
