= 2019–20 Saint Peter's Peacocks men's basketball team =

American college basketball season

2019–20 Saint Peter's Peacocks men's basketball
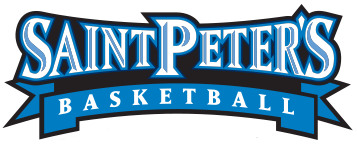
- Conference: Metro Atlantic Athletic Conference
- Record: 18–12 (14–6 MAAC)
- Head coach: Shaheen Holloway (2nd season)
- Assistant coaches: Ryan Whalen; Matt Eisele; John Morton
- Home arena: Yanitelli Center

2019–20 MAAC men's basketball standings
	Conf.				Overall
Team	W		L	PCT	W		L	PCT
Siena	15	–	5	.750	20	–	10	.667
Saint Peter's	14	–	6	.700	18	–	12	.600
Rider	12	–	8	.600	18	–	12	.600
Monmouth	12	–	8	.600	18	–	13	.581
Quinnipiac	10	–	10	.500	15	–	15	.500
Niagara	9	–	11	.450	12	–	20	.375
Iona	9	–	11	.450	12	–	16	.429
Fairfield	8	–	12	.400	12	–	20	.375
Manhattan	8	–	12	.400	13	–	17	.433
Canisius	7	–	13	.350	12	–	20	.375
Marist	6	–	14	.300	7	–	23	.233
Note: The 2020 MAAC tournament was canceled during the quarterfinals due to the COVID-19 pandemic.

The 2019–20 Saint Peter's Peacocks men's basketball team represented Saint Peter's University in the 2019–20 NCAA Division I men's basketball season. The Peacocks, led by 2nd-year head coach Shaheen Holloway, played their home games at Yanitelli Center in Jersey City, New Jersey as members of the Metro Atlantic Athletic Conference. They finished the season 18–12 overall, 14–6 in MAAC play to finish in second place. As the #2 seed in the MAAC tournament, they defeated #7 seed Iona 56–54 in the quarterfinals. However, the semifinals and championship game, and all postseason tournaments, were cancelled amid the COVID-19 pandemic.

== Previous season ==
The Peacocks finished the 2018–19 season 10–22 overall, 6–12 in MAAC play to finish in a three-way tie for ninth place. As the No. 9 seed in the MAAC tournament, they upset Marist before falling to Iona in the quarterfinals.

== Roster ==
2019–20 Saint Peter's Peacocks men's basketball team
Players
Coaches

Pos.	#	Name	Height	Weight	Year	Hometown
G	0	Dallas Watson	6 ft 4 in (1.93 m)	170 lb (77 kg)	So	Brooklyn, New York
G	1	Aaron Estrada	6 ft 4 in (1.93 m)	207 lb (94 kg)	Fr	Woodbury, New Jersey
G	2	Doug Edert	6 ft 2 in (1.88 m)	185 lb (84 kg)	Fr	Nutley, New Jersey
G	4	Nazeer Bostick	6 ft 4 in (1.93 m)	195 lb (88 kg)	RS Jr	Philadelphia, Pennsylvania
G	5	Daryl Banks III	6 ft 3 in (1.91 m)	165 lb (75 kg)	Fr	Los Angeles, California
F	10	Fousseyni Drame	6 ft 7 in (2.01 m)	192 lb (87 kg)	Fr	Bamako, Mali
F	11	KC Ndefo	6 ft 7 in (2.01 m)	195 lb (88 kg)	So	Elmont, New York
C	12	Majur Majak	7 ft 1 in (2.16 m)	215 lb (98 kg)	So	Juba, South Sudan
G	13	Amir Hicks	5 ft 11 in (1.8 m)	155 lb (70 kg)	Sr	Paterson, New Jersey
F	14	Hassan Drame	6 ft 7 in (2.01 m)	190 lb (86 kg)	Fr	Bamako, Mali
G	15	Matthew Lee	6 ft 0 in (1.83 m)	160 lb (73 kg)	Fr	San Juan, Puerto Rico
F	20	Derrick Woods	6 ft 8 in (2.03 m)	225 lb (102 kg)	Sr	Trenton, New Jersey
G/F	24	Quinn Taylor	6 ft 5 in (1.96 m)	200 lb (91 kg)	Sr	Amarillo, Texas
G	25	Cameron Jones	6 ft 3 in (1.91 m)	195 lb (88 kg)	GS	Fairless Hills, Pennsylvania

Head coach

- Shaheen Holloway (Seton Hall)

Assistant coach(es)

- Ryan Whalen (Saint Joseph's)
- Matt Eisele (Pittsburgh)
- John Morton (Seton Hall)

Legend

- (C) Team captain
- (S) Suspended
- (I) Ineligible
- (W) Walk-on
- Injured
- Current redshirt

Roster
Last update: November 21, 2019

== Schedule and results ==
Date time, TV	Rank^{#}	Opponent^{#}	Result	Record	Site (attendance) city, state
Exhibition
November 7, 2019*; 7:00 pm		New Jersey City; Battle of the Boulevard	W 88–61		Yanitelli Center (1,124); Jersey City, NJ
November 24, 2019*; 2:00 pm		at Caldwell	W 88–67		George R. Newman Center; Caldwell, NJ
Non-conference regular season
November 13, 2019*; 7:00 pm, ESPN+		Bryant	L 44–69	0–1	Yanitelli Center (728); Jersey City, NJ
November 16, 2019*; 2:00 pm, FS2		at Providence	L 47–68	0–2	Dunkin' Donuts Center (8,063); Providence, RI
November 20, 2019*; 7:00 pm, ESPN+		Wagner	L 77–81 ^{OT}	0–3	Yanitelli Center (520); Jersey City, NJ
November 30, 2019*; 1:00 pm, ESPN+		St. Francis Brooklyn	W 67–59	1–3	Yanitelli Center (569); Jersey City, NJ
December 3, 2019*; 6:30 pm, FS1		at St. John's	L 69–79	1–4	Carnesecca Arena (2,845); Queens, NY
December 11, 2019*; 7:00 pm, ESPN+		Fairleigh Dickinson	W 86–70	2–4	Yanitelli Center (586); Jersey City, NJ
December 18, 2019*; 7:00 pm, SNY		at UConn	L 56–66	2–5	XL Center (7,514); Hartford, CT
December 22, 2019*; 12:00 pm		at LIU	W 69–58	3–5	Barclays Center (681); Brooklyn, NY
December 28, 2019*; 1:00 pm, ESPN+		at Hampton	L 67–70	3–6	Hampton Convocation Center (2,525); Hampton, VA
MAAC regular season
January 3, 2020; 7:00 pm, ESPN+		at Iona	W 75–74	4–6 (1–0)	Hynes Athletic Center (1,388); New Rochelle, NY
January 5, 2020; 2:00 pm, ESPN+		Marist	W 66–40	5–6 (2–0)	Yanitelli Center (781); Jersey City, NJ
January 9, 2020; 7:00 pm, ESPN3		at Siena	L 58–61	5–7 (2–1)	Times Union Center (5,538); Albany, NY
January 12, 2020; 1:00 pm, ESPN3		Canisius	L 68–72	5–8 (2–2)	Yanitelli Center (522); Jersey City, NJ
January 15, 2020; 7:00 pm, ESPN+		at Fairfield	L 51–61	5–9 (2–3)	Alumni Hall (1,236); Fairfield, CT
January 18, 2020; 4:30 pm, ESPN+		at Quinnipiac	W 71–51	6–9 (3–3)	People's United Center (887); Hamden, CT
January 24, 2020; 7:00 pm, ESPN+		at Rider	L 66–70	6–10 (3–4)	Alumni Gymnasium (1,514); Lawrenceville, NJ
January 26, 2020; 2:00 pm, ESPN3		Niagara	W 58–53	7–10 (4–4)	Yanitelli Center (522); Jersey City, NJ
January 29, 2020; 7:00 pm, ESPN3		Monmouth	W 66–63	8–10 (5–4)	Yanitelli Center (655); Jersey City, NJ
January 31, 2020; 7:00 pm, ESPN+		Manhattan	W 70–53	9–10 (6–4)	Yanitelli Center (608); Jersey City, NJ
February 2, 2020; 4:00 pm, ESPN+		Siena	W 85–80	10–10 (7–4)	Yanitelli Center (637); Jersey City, NJ
February 7, 2020; 7:00 pm, ESPN3		at Marist	L 61–72	10–11 (7–5)	McCann Arena (1,165); Poughkeepsie, NY
February 9, 2020; 2:00 pm, ESPN+		at Monmouth	W 81–69	11–11 (8–5)	OceanFirst Bank Center (3,217); West Long Branch, NJ
February 14, 2020; 7:00 pm, ESPN3		Quinnipiac	W 84–72	12–11 (9–5)	Yanitelli Center (541); Jersey City, NJ
February 16, 2020; 2:00 pm, ESPN3		Fairfield	W 61–44	13–11 (10–5)	Yanitelli Center (887); Jersey City, NJ
February 21, 2020; 7:00 pm, ESPN3		at Manhattan	W 67–64	14–11 (11–5)	Draddy Gymnasium (1,112); Riverdale, NY
February 23, 2020; 2:00 pm, ESPN3		Rider	W 73–54	15–11 (12–5)	Yanitelli Center (842); Jersey City, NJ
February 27, 2020; 7:00 pm, ESPN+		at Niagara	L 54–63	15–12 (12–6)	Gallagher Center (985); Lewiston, NY
February 29, 2020; 2:00 pm, ESPN+		at Canisius	W 69–68	16–12 (13–6)	Koessler Athletic Center (1,204); Buffalo, NY
March 6, 2020; 7:00 pm, ESPN3		Iona	W 68–65	17–12 (14–6)	Yanitelli Center (505); Jersey City, NJ
MAAC tournament
March 11, 2020; 9:30 pm, ESPN3	(2)	vs. (7) Iona; Quarterfinals	W 56–54	18–12	Boardwalk Hall; Atlantic City, NJ
*Non-conference game. ^{#}Rankings from AP Poll. (#) Tournament seedings in parentheses. All times are in Eastern.
