= 2019–20 Siena Saints men's basketball team =

American college basketball season

2019–20 Siena Saints men's basketball

MAAC regular season champions
- Conference: Metro Atlantic Athletic Conference
- Record: 20–10 (15–5 MAAC)
- Head coach: Carmen Maciariello (1st season)
- Assistant coaches: Harley Fuller; Bob Simon; Antoni Wyche
- Home arena: Times Union Center

2019–20 MAAC men's basketball standings
	Conf.				Overall
Team	W		L	PCT	W		L	PCT
Siena	15	–	5	.750	20	–	10	.667
Saint Peter's	14	–	6	.700	18	–	12	.600
Rider	12	–	8	.600	18	–	12	.600
Monmouth	12	–	8	.600	18	–	13	.581
Quinnipiac	10	–	10	.500	15	–	15	.500
Niagara	9	–	11	.450	12	–	20	.375
Iona	9	–	11	.450	12	–	16	.429
Fairfield	8	–	12	.400	12	–	20	.375
Manhattan	8	–	12	.400	13	–	17	.433
Canisius	7	–	13	.350	12	–	20	.375
Marist	6	–	14	.300	7	–	23	.233
Note: The 2020 MAAC tournament was canceled during the quarterfinals due to the COVID-19 pandemic.

The 2019–20 Siena Saints men's basketball team represented Siena College in the 2019–20 NCAA Division I men's basketball season. The Saints, led by first-year head coach Carmen Maciariello, played their home games at the Times Union Center in Albany, New York as members of the Metro Atlantic Athletic Conference. They finished the season 20–10 overall, 15–5 in MAAC play to finish in first place. As the #1 seed in the MAAC tournament, they defeated #9 seed Manhattan 63–49 in the quarterfinals. However, the semifinals and championship game, and all postseason tournaments, were cancelled amid the COVID-19 pandemic.

== Previous season ==
The Saints finished the 2018–19 season 17–16 overall, 11–7 in MAAC play to finish in a four-way tie for second place. As the 5th seed in the 2019 MAAC tournament, they defeated No. 4 seed Rider in the quarterfinals 87–81, before falling to No. 1 seed Iona 57–73– in the semifinals.

On March 21, 2019, it was announced that head coach Jamion Christian would be accepting the head coaching position at George Washington. On March 25, it was announced that assistant coach Carmen Maciariello would be named as Christian's successor.

== MAAC Championship and NCAA Berth ==
Siena finished the regular season at 15–5 in conference play, good for first place and crowning the Saints as the 2019–20 MAAC regular season champion.

The Saints entered the conference tournament as the #1 seed on a 9-game winning streak and were heavy favorites to advance to the NCAA tournament. Manhattan coach Steve Masiello, went as far to reference the tournament as "The Siena Invitational". In their first game at the MAAC tournament, the Saints easily defeated #9 seed Manhattan 63–49. Just over 24 hours prior to their semifinal, the MAAC was forced to cancel the tournament due to the COVID-19 pandemic.

== Roster ==
2019–20 Siena Saints men's basketball team
Players
Coaches

Pos.	#	Name	Height	Weight	Year	Hometown
G	0	Donald Carey	6 ft 5 in (1.96 m)	185 lb (84 kg)	So	Upper Marlboro, Maryland
F	1	Elijah Burns	6 ft 8 in (2.03 m)	236 lb (107 kg)	GS	Troy, New York
G	2	Gary Harris, Jr.	6 ft 6 in (1.98 m)	193 lb (88 kg)	Fr	Los Angeles, California
G/F	3	Manny Camper	6 ft 7 in (2.01 m)	203 lb (92 kg)	Jr	Chestertown, Maryland
G	5	Matt Hein	6 ft 4 in (1.93 m)	190 lb (86 kg)	GS	Windermere, Florida
F	12	Kyle Young	6 ft 9 in (2.06 m)	239 lb (108 kg)	Fr	Bethlehem, Pennsylvania
G	13	Ben Diamond	5 ft 11 in (1.8 m)	152 lb (69 kg)	Sr	Loudonville, New York
G	14	Jordan King	6 ft 0 in (1.83 m)	185 lb (84 kg)	Fr	Albany, New York
G	15	Robert Mahala	6 ft 5 in (1.96 m)	168 lb (76 kg)	So	Jackson, New Jersey
F	20	Denzel Tchougang	6 ft 10 in (2.08 m)	218 lb (99 kg)	RS Jr	Geneva, Switzerland
G	22	Jalen Pickett	6 ft 4 in (1.93 m)	192 lb (87 kg)	So	Rochester, New York
G	24	Jimmy Ratliff	6 ft 8 in (2.03 m)	186 lb (84 kg)	So	Middletown, Ohio
F	30	Luke Sutherland	6 ft 7 in (2.01 m)	203 lb (92 kg)	Fr	Syracuse, New York
G	33	Georges Darwiche	6 ft 1 in (1.85 m)	192 lb (87 kg)	So	Bucharest, Romania
F	35	Sammy Friday IV	6 ft 9 in (2.06 m)	237 lb (108 kg)	Sr	Jersey City, New Jersey

Head coach

- Carmen Maciariello (Siena)

Assistant coach(es)

- Harley Fuller (Molloy)
- Bob Simon (Eastern Michigan)
- Antoni Wyche (Notre Dame)

Legend

- (C) Team captain
- (S) Suspended
- (I) Ineligible
- (W) Walk-on
- Injured
- Current redshirt

Roster
Last update: November 15, 2019

== Schedule and results ==
Date time, TV	Rank^{#}	Opponent^{#}	Result	Record	Site (attendance) city, state
Regular season
November 5, 2019*; 7:30 pm, ESPN+		American	W 96–80	1–0	Times Union Center (5,371); Albany, NY
November 8, 2019*; 7:00 pm, FSN/YES		at No. 19 Xavier	L 63–81	1–1	Cintas Center (10,430); Cincinnati, OH
November 12, 2019*; 7:00 pm, ESPN+		St. Bonaventure; Br. Ed Coughlin Franciscan Cup	W 78–65	2–1	Times Union Center (5,680); Albany, NY
November 14, 2019*; 7:00 pm, ESPN+		at Harvard	L 56–59	2–2	Lavietes Pavilion (1,269); Boston, MA
November 20, 2019*; 7:30 pm, ESPN+		at Yale	L 89–100 ^{3OT}	2–3	John J. Lee Amphitheater (746); New Haven, CT
November 30, 2019*; 7:00 pm, Patriot League Network		at Colgate	L 62-72	2–4	Cotterell Court (872); Hamilton, NY
December 7, 2019*; 10:00 pm		at Cal Poly	L 66-70	2–5	Robert A. Mott Athletics Center (1,632); San Luis Obispo, CA
December 21, 2019*; 6:00 pm, My 4 Albany/ESPN+		Bucknell	W 81–71	3–5	Times Union Center (5,505); Albany, NY
December 23, 2019; 6:00 pm, My 4 Albany/ESPN3		Canisius	W 73–72	4–5 (1–0)	Times Union Center (5,804); Albany, NY
December 29, 2019*; 2:00 pm, My 4 Albany/ESPN+		Holy Cross	W 74–62	5–5	Times Union Center (6,202); Albany, NY
January 3, 2020; 7:00 pm, My 4 Albany/ESPN3		Monmouth	W 75–72	6–5 (2–0)	Times Union Center (6,273); Albany, NY
January 5, 2020; 2:00 pm, ESPN+		at Rider	L 77–85	6–6 (2–1)	Alumni Gymnasium (1,541); Lawrenceville, NJ
January 9, 2020; 7:00 pm, My 4 Albany/ESPN3		Saint Peter's	W 61–58	7–6 (3–1)	Times Union Center (5,538); Albany, NY
January 12, 2019; 2:00 pm, ESPN+		at Manhattan	L 69–81	7–7 (3–2)	Draddy Gymnasium (1,657); Bronx, NY
January 17, 2020; 7:00 pm, ESPN+		at Canisius	L 63–73	7–8 (3–3)	Koessler Athletic Center (1,203); Buffalo, NY
January 19, 2020; 1:00 pm, ESPN+		at Niagara	L 71–72	7–9 (3–4)	Gallagher Center (1,020); Lewiston, NY
January 24, 2020; 7:00 pm, My 4 Albany/ESPN+		Marist	W 70–57	8–9 (4–4)	Times Union Center (6,693); Albany, NY
January 26, 2020; 2:00 pm, My 4 Albany/ESPN3		Quinnipiac	W 84–61	9–9 (5–4)	Times Union Center (6,752); Albany, NY
January 31, 2020; 7:00 pm, ESPN+		at Iona	W 87–64	10–9 (6–4)	Hynes Athletic Center (1,780); New Rochelle, NY
February 2, 2020; 4:00 pm, ESPN+		at Saint Peter's	L 80–85	10–10 (6–5)	Yanitelli Center (637); Jersey City, NJ
February 7, 2020; 7:00 pm, My 4 Albany/ESPN3		Fairfield	W 65–49	11–10 (7–5)	Times Union Center (6,581); Albany, NY
February 14, 2020; 9:00 pm, ESPNU		Rider	W 73–64	12–10 (8–5)	Times Union Center (5,600); Albany, NY
February 16, 2020; 2:00 pm, My 4 Albany/ESPN3		Manhattan	W 65–52	13–10 (9–5)	Times Union Center (7,146); Albany, NY
February 19, 2020; 7:00 pm, My 4 Albany/ESPN3		Iona	W 65–64	14–10 (10–5)	Times Union Center (6,897); Albany, NY
February 23, 2020; 2:00 pm, ESPN+		at Fairfield	W 62–59	15–10 (11–5)	Alumni Hall (2,479); Fairfield, CT
February 26, 2020; 7:00 pm, ESPN+		at Quinnipiac	W 84–77	16–10 (12–5)	People's United Center (824); Hamden, CT
February 28, 2020; 7:00 pm, ESPN3		at Marist	W 52–50	17–10 (13–5)	McCann Arena (1,705); Poughkeepsie, NY
March 4, 2020; 7:00 pm, My 4 Albany/ESPN3		Niagara	W 77–55	18–10 (14–5)	Times Union Center (7,146); Albany, NY
March 6, 2020; 7:00 pm, ESPN+		at Monmouth	W 86–72	19–10 (15–5)	OceanFirst Bank Center (2,657); West Long Branch, NJ
MAAC tournament
March 11, 2020; 7:00 pm, ESPN3	(1)	vs. (9) Manhattan; Quarterfinals	W 63–49	20–10	Boardwalk Hall; Atlantic City, NJ
*Non-conference game. ^{#}Rankings from AP Poll. (#) Tournament seedings in parentheses. All times are in Eastern.
