= 2019–20 Canisius Golden Griffins men's basketball team =

American college basketball season

2019–20 Canisius Golden Griffins men's basketball
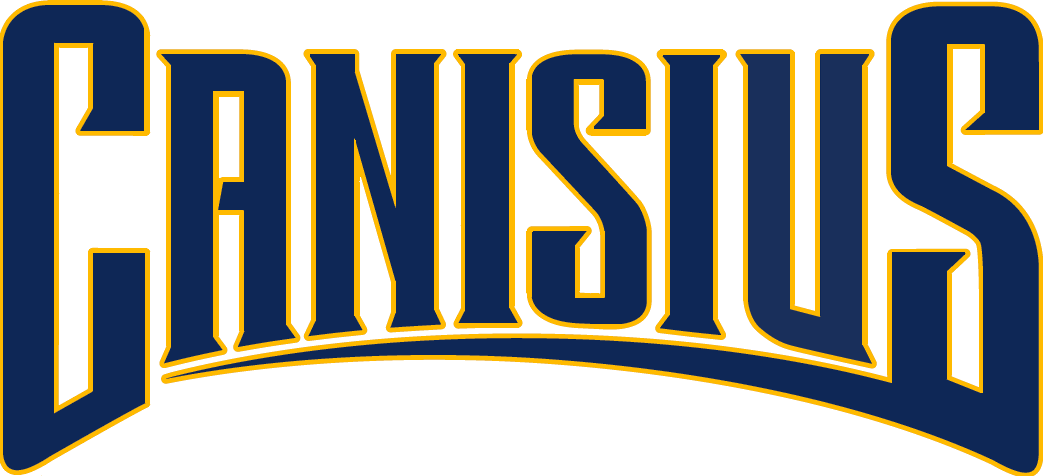
- Conference: Metro Atlantic Athletic Conference
- Record: 12–20 (7–13 MAAC)
- Head coach: Reggie Witherspoon (4th season)
- Assistant coaches: Chris Hawkins; Thurman Schaetzle; Calvin Cage
- Home arena: Koessler Athletic Center

2019–20 MAAC men's basketball standings
	Conf.				Overall
Team	W		L	PCT	W		L	PCT
Siena	15	–	5	.750	20	–	10	.667
Saint Peter's	14	–	6	.700	18	–	12	.600
Rider	12	–	8	.600	18	–	12	.600
Monmouth	12	–	8	.600	18	–	13	.581
Quinnipiac	10	–	10	.500	15	–	15	.500
Niagara	9	–	11	.450	12	–	20	.375
Iona	9	–	11	.450	12	–	16	.429
Fairfield	8	–	12	.400	12	–	20	.375
Manhattan	8	–	12	.400	13	–	17	.433
Canisius	7	–	13	.350	12	–	20	.375
Marist	6	–	14	.300	7	–	23	.233
Note: The 2020 MAAC tournament was canceled during the quarterfinals due to the COVID-19 pandemic.

The 2019–20 Canisius Golden Griffins men's basketball team represented Canisius College in the 2019–20 NCAA Division I men's basketball season. The Golden Griffins, led by fourth-year head coach Reggie Witherspoon, played their home games at the Koessler Athletic Center in Buffalo, New York as members of the Metro Atlantic Athletic Conference. They finished the season 12–20, 7–13 in MAAC play to finish in tenth place. They lost in the first round of the MAAC tournament to Iona.

== Previous season ==
The Golden Griffins finished the 2018–19 season 15–17 overall, 11–7 in MAAC play to finish in a four-way tie for second place. As the No. 2 seed in the 2019 MAAC tournament, they defeated No. 7 seed Manhattan in the quarterfinals 69–65 in overtime, before falling to No. 6 seed Monmouth 59–73 in the semifinals.

== Roster ==
2019–20 Canisius Golden Griffins men's basketball team
Players
Coaches

Pos.	#	Name	Height	Weight	Year	Hometown
G	0	Akrum Ahemed	6 ft 5 in (1.96 m)	185 lb (84 kg)	Fr	Hackensack, New Jersey
G	1	Malik Johnson	5 ft 10 in (1.78 m)	165 lb (75 kg)	Sr	Richmond, Virginia
F	2	Corey Brown	6 ft 8 in (2.03 m)	225 lb (102 kg)	Sr	Hollywood, Florida
G	3	Jordan Henderson	6 ft 5 in (1.96 m)	180 lb (82 kg)	So	Cincinnati, Ohio
F	4	Jalanni White	6 ft 8 in (2.03 m)	215 lb (98 kg)	Jr	New Haven, Connecticut
G	5	Sam Rautins	6 ft 4 in (1.93 m)	190 lb (86 kg)	So	Syracuse, New York
F	10	Jacco Fritz	6 ft 10 in (2.08 m)	190 lb (86 kg)	Fr	Tiel, Netherlands
G	11	Armon Harried	6 ft 4 in (1.93 m)	185 lb (84 kg)	Fr	Baltimore, Maryland
G	15	Majesty Brandon	6 ft 0 in (1.83 m)	165 lb (75 kg)	Jr	Bronx, New York
F	21	Scott Hitchon	6 ft 8 in (2.03 m)	215 lb (98 kg)	Jr	Whitby, Ontario
F	22	Malek Green	6 ft 7 in (2.01 m)	215 lb (98 kg)	Jr	Cincinnati, Ohio
F	23	Dantai St. Louis	6 ft 8 in (2.03 m)	235 lb (107 kg)	Sr	Brampton, Ontario
C	24	Ivan Hadžic	6 ft 9 in (2.06 m)	240 lb (109 kg)	So	Šabac, Serbia

Head coach

- Reggie Witherspoon (Wheeling)

Assistant coach(es)

- Chris Hawkins (Radford)
- Thurman Schaetzle (Canisius)
- Calvin Cage (Buffalo)

Legend

- (C) Team captain
- (S) Suspended
- (I) Ineligible
- (W) Walk-on
- Injured
- Current redshirt

Roster
Last update: November 20, 2019

== Schedule and results ==
Date time, TV	Rank^{#}	Opponent^{#}	Result	Record	Site (attendance) city, state
Exhibition
November 2, 2019*; 12:00 pm		McMaster	W 81–71		Koessler Athletic Center (691); Buffalo, NY
Regular season
November 9, 2019*; 4:30 pm, ESPN+		at Brown	L 68–75	0–1	Pizzitola Sports Center (812); Providence, RI
November 13, 2019*; 7:00 pm, ESPN+		at Albany	L 57–83	0–2	SEFCU Arena (1,808); Albany, NY
November 16, 2019*; 7:00 pm, ESPN3		Bucknell	W 83–81	1–2	Koessler Athletic Center (984); Buffalo, NY
November 23, 2019*; 2:30 pm		vs. St. Bonaventure	W 61–57	2–2	KeyBank Center (3,821); Buffalo, NY
November 26, 2019*; 8:00 pm, ESPN+		at UIC; Boca Raton Beach Classic	W 94–64	3–2	Credit Union 1 Arena (1,343); Chicago, IL
December 1, 2019*; 12:00 pm, CUSA.tv		vs. Mercer; Boca Raton Beach Classic Naismith semifinals	W 76–66	4–2	FAU Arena (1,411); Boca Raton, FL
December 2, 2019*; 2:00 pm, CUSA.tv		vs. Hofstra; Boca Raton Beach Classic Naismith championship game	L 57–64	4–3	FAU Arena (1,122); Boca Raton, FL
December 4, 2019*; 7:00 pm, CUSA.tv		at Florida Atlantic; Boca Raton Beach Classic	L 59–62	4–4	FAU Arena (987); Boca Raton, FL
December 14, 2019*; 2:00 pm, ESPN+		Holy Cross	W 80–72	5–4	Koessler Athletic Center (896); Buffalo, NY
December 18, 2019*; 7:00 pm, ESPN+		at Buffalo	L 73–82	5–5	Alumni Arena (3,269); Buffalo, NY
December 23, 2019; 6:00 pm, ESPN3		at Siena	L 72–73	5–6 (0–1)	Times Union Center (5,804); Albany, NY
December 30, 2019*; 2:00 pm, ACCNX		at Pittsburgh	L 79–87	5–7	Petersen Events Center (8,035); Pittsburgh, PA
January 3, 2020; 7:00 pm, ESPN+		Manhattan	L 67–71	5–8 (0–2)	Koessler Athletic Center (829); Buffalo, NY
January 5, 2020; 2:00 pm, ESPN+		Fairfield	L 42–46	5–9 (0–3)	Koessler Athletic Center (751); Buffalo, NY
January 10, 2020; 7:00 pm, ESPN+		at Monmouth	L 65–84	5–10 (0–4)	OceanFirst Bank Center (1,720); West Long Branch, NJ
January 12, 2020; 1:00 pm, ESPN3		at Saint Peter's	W 72–68	6–10 (1–4)	Yanitelli Center (522); Jersey City, NJ
January 17, 2020; 7:00 pm, ESPN+		Siena	W 73–63	7–10 (2–4)	Koessler Athletic Center (1,203); Buffalo, NY
January 19, 2020; 2:00 pm, ESPN+		Rider	W 95–86	8–10 (3–4)	Koessler Athletic Center (1,254); Buffalo, NY
January 24, 2020; 7:00 pm, ESPN3		at Iona	L 66–69	8–11 (3–5)	Hynes Athletic Center (1,538); New Rochelle, NY
January 26, 2020; 2:00 pm, ESPN3		at Fairfield	L 55–63	8–12 (3–6)	Alumni Hall (2,479); Fairfield, CT
January 31, 2020; 7:00 pm, ESPN+		Quinnipiac	L 73–90	8–13 (3–7)	Koessler Athletic Center (1,201); Buffalo, NY
February 2, 2020; 2:00 pm, ESPN+		Marist	W 66–65	9–13 (4–7)	Koessler Athletic Center (969); Buffalo, NY
February 7, 2020; 7:00 pm, ESPN3		at Rider	L 60–61	9–14 (4–8)	Alumni Gymnasium (1,650); Lawrenceville, NJ
February 12, 2020; 7:00 pm, ESPN3		at Niagara; Battle of the Bridge	L 66–69	9–15 (4–9)	Gallagher Center (1,568); Lewiston, NY
February 14, 2020; 7:00 pm, ESPN+		Monmouth	L 71–85	9–16 (4–10)	Koessler Athletic Center (883); Buffalo, NY
February 21, 2020; 7:00 pm, ESPNU		at Quinnipiac	L 64–66	9–17 (4–11)	People's United Center (2,512); Hamden, CT
February 23, 2020; 2:00 pm, ESPN3		at Manhattan	W 57–56	10–17 (5–11)	Draddy Gymnasium (1,347); Bronx, NY
February 27, 2020; 7:00 pm, ESPN+		Iona	L 65–86	10–18 (5–12)	Koessler Athletic Center (1,181); Buffalo, NY
February 29, 2020; 2:00 pm, ESPN+		Saint Peter's	L 68–69	10–19 (5–13)	Koessler Athletic Center (1,204); Buffalo, NY
March 4, 2020; 7:00 pm, ESPN3		at Marist	W 85–69	11–19 (6–13)	McCann Arena (1,124); Poughkeepsie, NY
March 6, 2020; 7:00 pm, ESPN+		Niagara; Battle of the Bridge	W 67–63	12–19 (7–13)	Koessler Athletic Center (1,805); Buffalo, NY
MAAC tournament
March 10, 2020; 7:00 pm, ESPN3	(10)	vs. (7) Iona; First round	L 60–70	12–20	Boardwalk Hall (878); Atlantic City, NJ
*Non-conference game. ^{#}Rankings from AP Poll. (#) Tournament seedings in parentheses. All times are in Eastern.
