= 2019–20 Iona Gaels men's basketball team =

American college basketball season

2019–20 Iona Gaels men's basketball
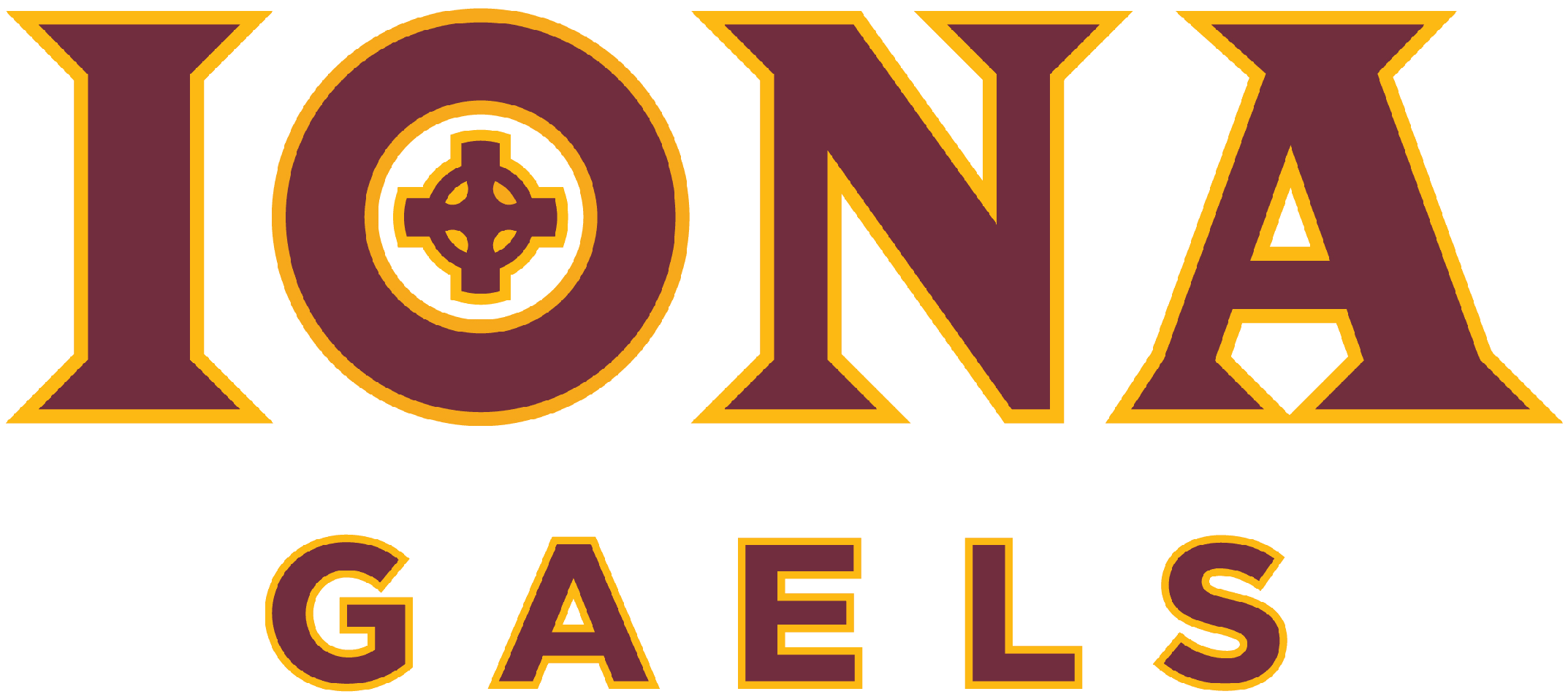
- Conference: Metro Atlantic Athletic Conference
- Record: 12–17 (9–11 MAAC)
- Head coach: Tra Arnold (1st season)
- Assistant coaches: Jeff Mailhot; Ricky Johns
- Home arena: Hynes Athletic Center

2019–20 MAAC men's basketball standings
	Conf.				Overall
Team	W		L	PCT	W		L	PCT
Siena	15	–	5	.750	20	–	10	.667
Saint Peter's	14	–	6	.700	18	–	12	.600
Rider	12	–	8	.600	18	–	12	.600
Monmouth	12	–	8	.600	18	–	13	.581
Quinnipiac	10	–	10	.500	15	–	15	.500
Niagara	9	–	11	.450	12	–	20	.375
Iona	9	–	11	.450	12	–	16	.429
Fairfield	8	–	12	.400	12	–	20	.375
Manhattan	8	–	12	.400	13	–	17	.433
Canisius	7	–	13	.350	12	–	20	.375
Marist	6	–	14	.300	7	–	23	.233
Note: The 2020 MAAC tournament was canceled during the quarterfinals due to the COVID-19 pandemic.

The 2019–20 Iona Gaels men's basketball team represented Iona College in the 2019–20 NCAA Division I men's basketball season. The Gaels were to be led by 10th-year head coach Tim Cluess, but he never coached a game for health reasons. Associate head coach Tra Arnold took over the head coaching duties for this season. They played their home games at the Hynes Athletic Center in New Rochelle, New York as members of the Metro Atlantic Athletic Conference. They finished the season 12–17, 9–11 in MAAC play to finish in a tie for sixth place. As the No. 7 seed in the MAAC tournament, they defeated Canisius before losing to Saint Peter's in the quarterfinals.

Following the season, Cluess stepped down as head coach of the Gaels due to health concerns. A day later, the school named former Louisville coach Rick Pitino the Gaels' new head coach.

== Previous season ==
The Gaels finished the 2018–19 season 17–16 overall, 12–6 in MAAC play to win the regular season championship. They defeated Saint Peter's, Siena, and Monmouth to win the MAAC tournament for a record fourth consecutive time. As a result, they received the MAAC's automatic bid to the NCAA tournament as the No. 16 seed in the Midwest region. There they lost to No. 1 seeded North Carolina in the first round 88–73, despite leading by 5 at halftime.

== Roster ==
2019–20 Iona Gaels men's basketball team
Players
Coaches

Pos.	#	Name	Height	Weight	Year	Hometown
F	0	Mo Thiam	6 ft 9 in (2.06 m)	210 lb (95 kg)	Sr	Dakar, Senegal
G	1	A.J. McNeil	6 ft 2 in (1.88 m)	185 lb (84 kg)	Jr	Stone Mountain, Georgia
G/F	2	E.J. Crawford	6 ft 6 in (1.98 m)	210 lb (95 kg)	Sr	Hartford, Connecticut
G	3	Asante Gist	5 ft 11 in (1.8 m)	185 lb (84 kg)	Jr	East Orange, New Jersey
G	4	Parker Weiss	6 ft 3 in (1.91 m)	170 lb (77 kg)	Fr	Naples, Florida
G	5	Ben Perez	6 ft 4 in (1.93 m)	180 lb (82 kg)	Sr	San Marcos, California
F	10	Andrija Ristanovic	6 ft 11 in (2.11 m)	215 lb (98 kg)	So	Belgrade, Serbia
G	11	Isaiah Washington	6 ft 1 in (1.85 m)	195 lb (88 kg)	Jr	Harlem, New York
F	12	Tajuan Agee	6 ft 9 in (2.06 m)	225 lb (102 kg)	Sr	Chicago, Illinois
G	13	Colton Cashaw	6 ft 3 in (1.91 m)	190 lb (86 kg)	Jr	Charlotte, North Carolina
G	20	Isaiah Ross	6 ft 4 in (1.93 m)	200 lb (91 kg)	Jr	Davenport, Iowa
G	23	Michael Ortale Jr.	6 ft 4 in (1.93 m)	200 lb (91 kg)	Fr	Delmar, New York
F	24	Dylan van Eyck	6 ft 9 in (2.06 m)	210 lb (95 kg)	Jr	Boskoop, Netherlands
F	44	Niksa Nikolic	6 ft 8 in (2.03 m)	235 lb (107 kg)	Sr	Belgrade, Serbia

Head coach

- Tra Arnold (Biola)

Assistant coach(es)

- Jeff Mailhot (Cal Baptist)
- Ricky Johns (Monroe)

Legend

- (C) Team captain
- (S) Suspended
- (I) Ineligible
- (W) Walk-on
- Injured
- Current redshirt

Roster
Last update: November 20, 2019

== Schedule and results ==
Date time, TV	Rank^{#}	Opponent^{#}	Result	Record	Site (attendance) city, state
Exhibition
November 2, 2019*; 7:30 pm		Mount Saint Vincent	W 112–79		Hynes Athletic Center; New Rochelle, NY
Non-conference regular season
November 9, 2019*; 4:00 pm, NBCSN		at La Salle	L 64–70 ^{OT}	0–1	Tom Gola Arena (3,135); Philadelphia, PA
November 13, 2019*; 7:00 pm, ESPN+		Ohio	L 72–81	0–2	Hynes Athletic Center (2,013); New Rochelle, NY
November 22, 2019*; 6:00 pm, ESPN3		vs. Stetson; MAAC/ASUN Challenge	W 60–55	1–2	HP Field House (148); Lake Buena Vista, FL
November 23, 2019*; 6:00 pm, ESPN3		vs. Kennesaw State; MAAC/ASUN Challenge	W 75–52	2–2	HP Field House (113); Lake Buena Vista, FL
December 4, 2019*; 7:00 pm, SNY/ESPN3		at UConn	L 62–80	2–3	Harry A. Gampel Pavilion (5,909); Storrs, CT
December 17, 2019*; 4:30 pm		vs. Princeton; Basketball Hall of Fame Invitational	L 86–90 ^{OT}	2–4	Barclays Center (5,064); Brooklyn, NY
December 29, 2019*; 2:00 pm, P12N		at Colorado	L 54–99	2–5	CU Events Center (6,753); Boulder, CO
MAAC regular season
January 3, 2020; 7:00 pm, ESPN+		Saint Peter's	L 74–75	2–6 (0–1)	Hynes Athletic Center (1,388); New Rochelle, NY
January 5, 2020; 2:00 pm, ESPN3		at Monmouth	L 61–73	2–7 (0–2)	OceanFirst Bank Center (2,261); West Long Branch, NJ
January 10, 2020; 7:00 pm, ESPNU		at Rider	W 69–66	3–7 (1–2)	Alumni Gymnasium (1,611); Lawrenceville, NJ
January 12, 2020; 1:00 pm, ESPN+		Niagara	L 69–70	3–8 (1–3)	Hynes Athletic Center (1,317); New Rochelle, NY
January 17, 2020; 7:00 pm, ESPN3		Fairfield	W 64–57	4–8 (2–3)	Hynes Athletic Center (1,428); New Rochelle, NY
January 19, 2020; 2:00 pm, ESPN3		at Marist	L 73–83	4–9 (2–4)	McCann Arena (1,205); Poughkeepsie, NY
January 24, 2020; 7:00 pm, ESPN3		Canisius	W 69–66	5–9 (3–4)	Hynes Athletic Center (1,538); New Rochelle, NY
January 26, 2020; 1:00 pm, ESPN+		Monmouth	L 88–94	5–10 (3–5)	Hynes Athletic Center (1,313); New Rochelle, NY
January 31, 2020; 7:00 pm, ESPN+		Siena	L 64–87	5–11 (3–6)	Hynes Athletic Center (1,780); New Rochelle, NY
February 2, 2020; 12:00 pm, ESPN+		at Manhattan	L 49–72	5–12 (3–7)	Draddy Gymnasium (1,289); Riverdale, NY
February 7, 2020; 7:00 pm, ESPN3		at Quinnipiac	W 73–52	6–12 (4–7)	People's United Center (2,257); Hamden, CT
February 9, 2020; 2:00 pm, ESPN+		at Fairfield	W 78–54	7–12 (5–7)	Webster Bank Arena (1,531); Bridgeport, CT
February 14, 2020; 7 or 9:00 pm, ESPN3		Manhattan	W 80–57	8–12 (6–7)	Hynes Athletic Center (1,694); New Rochelle, NY
February 16, 2020; 1:00 pm, ESPN+		Marist	W 78–70	9–12 (7–7)	Hynes Athletic Center (1,372); New Rochelle, NY
February 19, 2020; 7:00 pm, ESPN3		at Siena	L 64–65	9–13 (7–8)	Times Union Center (6,897); Albany, NY
February 21, 2020; 7:00 pm, ESPN3		Rider	W 70–69	10–13 (8–8)	Hynes Athletic Center (1,734); New Rochelle, NY
February 27, 2020; 7:00 pm, ESPN+		at Canisius	W 86–65	11–13 (9–8)	Koessler Athletic Center (1,181); Buffalo, NY
February 29, 2020; 1:00 pm, ESPN3		at Niagara	L 91–100 ^{OT}	11–14 (9–9)	Gallagher Center (1,193); Lewiston, NY
March 4, 2020; 7:00 pm, ESPN+		Quinnipiac	L 68–69	11–15 (9–10)	Hynes Athletic Center (1,592); New Rochelle, NY
March 6, 2020; 7:00 pm, ESPN3		at Saint Peter's	L 65–68	11–16 (9–11)	Yanitelli Center (505); Jersey City, NJ
MAAC tournament
March 10, 2020; 7:00 pm, ESPN3	(7)	vs. (10) Canisius; First round	W 70–60	12–16	Boardwalk Hall (878); Atlantic City, NJ
March 11, 2020; 9:30 pm, ESPN3	(7)	vs. (2) Saint Peter's; Quarterfinals	L 54–56	12–17	Boardwalk Hall; Atlantic City, NJ
*Non-conference game. ^{#}Rankings from AP Poll. (#) Tournament seedings in parentheses. All times are in Eastern.
