= 2019–20 Fairfield Stags men's basketball team =

American college basketball season

2019–20 Fairfield Stags men's basketball
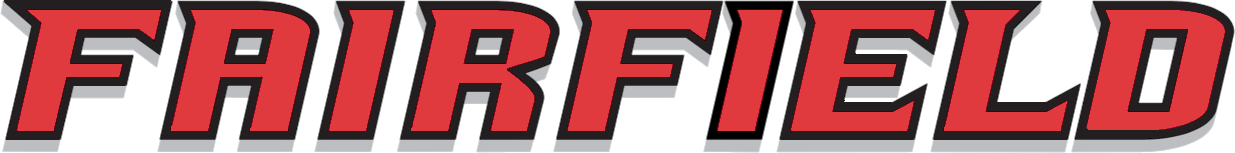
- Conference: Metro Atlantic Athletic Conference
- Record: 12–20 (8–12 MAAC)
- Head coach: Jay Young (1st season)
- Assistant coaches: Chris Casey; Bryan Dougher; Patrick Sellers
- Home arena: Webster Bank Arena; Alumni Hall

2019–20 MAAC men's basketball standings
	Conf.				Overall
Team	W		L	PCT	W		L	PCT
Siena	15	–	5	.750	20	–	10	.667
Saint Peter's	14	–	6	.700	18	–	12	.600
Rider	12	–	8	.600	18	–	12	.600
Monmouth	12	–	8	.600	18	–	13	.581
Quinnipiac	10	–	10	.500	15	–	15	.500
Niagara	9	–	11	.450	12	–	20	.375
Iona	9	–	11	.450	12	–	16	.429
Fairfield	8	–	12	.400	12	–	20	.375
Manhattan	8	–	12	.400	13	–	17	.433
Canisius	7	–	13	.350	12	–	20	.375
Marist	6	–	14	.300	7	–	23	.233
Note: The 2020 MAAC tournament was canceled during the quarterfinals due to the COVID-19 pandemic.

The 2019–20 Fairfield Stags men's basketball team represented Fairfield University in the 2019–20 NCAA Division I men's basketball season. The Stags, led by first-year head coach Jay Young, played their home games at Webster Bank Arena in Bridgeport, Connecticut and Alumni Hall in Fairfield, Connecticut as members of the Metro Atlantic Athletic Conference (MAAC). They finished the season 12–20, 8–12 in MAAC play, to finish in a tie for eighth place. They lost in the first round of the MAAC tournament to Manhattan.

== Previous season ==
The Stags finished the 2018–19 season 9–22 overall, 6–12 in MAAC play to finish in a three-way tie for ninth place. As the 10th seed in the 2019 MAAC tournament, they were defeated by No. 7 seed Manhattan in the first round 53–57.

On March 11, 2019, head coach Sydney Johnson was fired. He finished at Fairfield with an eight-year record of 116–147. On April 3, Rutgers assistant Jay Young was announced as Johnson's replacement.

== Roster ==
2019–20 Fairfield Stags men's basketball team
Players
Coaches

Pos.	#	Name	Height	Weight	Year	Hometown
G	0	Caleb Green	5 ft 10 in (1.78 m)	175 lb (79 kg)	Jr	Londonderry, NH
F	1	Chris Maidoh	6 ft 10 in (2.08 m)	180 lb (82 kg)	Fr	New Carrollton, MD
G	2	Taj Benning	6 ft 4 in (1.93 m)	202 lb (92 kg)	Jr	Fair Lawn, NJ
G	4	Jack Mullally	5 ft 10 in (1.78 m)	155 lb (70 kg)	Fr	Belle Harbor, NY
G	5	Aidas Kavaliauskas	6 ft 1 in (1.85 m)	180 lb (82 kg)	Sr	Kaunas, Lithuania
F	10	Allan Jeanne-Rose	6 ft 7 in (2.01 m)	185 lb (84 kg)	Fr	Saint-Joseph, Martinique
G	11	Calvin Whipple	6 ft 4 in (1.93 m)	195 lb (88 kg)	So	Leominster, MA
F	12	Kevin Senghore-Peterson	6 ft 7 in (2.01 m)	235 lb (107 kg)	Jr	Gothenburg, Sweden
F	15	Wassef Methnani	6 ft 8 in (2.03 m)	208 lb (94 kg)	Jr	Kairouan, Tunisia
G	21	Mark Henry	5 ft 11 in (1.8 m)	166 lb (75 kg)	Fr	Hamburg, NY
F	22	John Kelly	6 ft 7 in (2.01 m)	195 lb (88 kg)	Fr	Shelton, CT
F	23	Vincent Eze	6 ft 8 in (2.03 m)	210 lb (95 kg)	GS	Lagos, Nigeria
G	24	Jesus Cruz	6 ft 5 in (1.96 m)	210 lb (95 kg)	Jr	Carolina, Puerto Rico
G	25	Landon Taliaferro	6 ft 5 in (1.96 m)	192 lb (87 kg)	Sr	Boulder, CO
F	30	Omar El-Sheikh	6 ft 8 in (2.03 m)	220 lb (100 kg)	Jr	Cairo, Egypt
F	35	Tshiefu Ngalakulondi	6 ft 7 in (2.01 m)	215 lb (98 kg)	Jr	Manchester, NH

Head coach

- Jay Young (Marist)

Assistant coach(es)

- Chris Casey (Western Connecticut State)
- Bryan Dougher (Stony Brook)
- Patrick Sellers (Central Connecticut State)

Legend

- (C) Team captain
- (S) Suspended
- (I) Ineligible
- (W) Walk-on
- Injured
- Current redshirt

Roster
Last update: October 3, 2024

== Schedule and results ==
Date time, TV	Rank^{#}	Opponent^{#}	Result	Record	Site (attendance) city, state
Non-conference regular season
November 5, 2019*; 7:00 p.m.		Bucknell	L 64–68	0–1	Webster Bank Arena (1,063); Bridgeport, CT
November 9, 2019*; 1:00 p.m.		UMass	L 60–62	0–2	Webster Bank Arena (1,087); Bridgeport, CT
November 12, 2019*; 7:00 p.m.		at Holy Cross	W 68–63 ^{OT}	1–2	Hart Center (1,712); Worcester, MA
November 17, 2019*; 6:00 p.m.		at Loyola (MD)	L 75–84 ^{OT}	1–3	Reitz Arena (1,241); Baltimore, MD
November 19, 2019*; 8:30 p.m., BTN		at No. 6 Maryland	L 55–74	1–4	Xfinity Center (11,412); College Park, MD
November 28, 2019*; 4:00 p.m., ESPNU		vs. USC; Orlando Invitational quarterfinals	L 47–54	1–5	HP Field House (2,084); Orlando, FL
November 29, 2019*; 7:00 p.m., ESPNews		vs. Davidson; Orlando Invitational consolation 2nd round	L 56–67	1–6	HP Field House (2,457); Orlando, FL
December 1, 2019*; 10:30 a.m., ESPNU		vs. Texas A&M; Orlando Invitational 7th-place game	W 67–62	2–6	HP Field House; Orlando, FL
December 8, 2019*; 2:00 p.m.		William & Mary	L 58–62	2–7	Alumni Hall (2,161); Fairfield, CT
December 21, 2019*; 2:00 p.m.		at Oakland	W 61–59 ^{OT}	3–7	Athletics Center O'rena (2,788); Auburn Hills, MI
December 28, 2019*; 4:00 p.m.		at Wagner	W 66–54	4–7	Spiro Sports Center (1,203); Staten Island, NY
MAAC regular season
January 3, 2020; 7:00 p.m.		at Niagara	L 66–75	4–8 (0–1)	Gallagher Center (1,115); Lewiston, NY
January 5, 2020; 2:00 p.m., ESPN+		at Canisius	W 46–42	5–8 (1–1)	Koessler Athletic Center (751); Buffalo, NY
January 8, 2020; 7:00 p.m., ESPN+		Marist	L 58–70	5–9 (1–2)	Webster Bank Arena (1,003); Bridgeport, CT
January 10, 2020; 7:00 p.m., ESPN+		Manhattan	W 68–60	6–9 (2–2)	Alumni Hall (1,754); Fairfield, CT
January 15, 2020; 7:00 p.m., ESPN+		Saint Peter's	W 61–51	7–9 (3–2)	Alumni Hall (1,236); Fairfield, CT
January 17, 2020; 7:00 p.m., ESPN3		at Iona	L 57–64	7–10 (3–3)	Hynes Athletic Center (1,428); New Rochelle, NY
January 24, 2020; 7:00 p.m., ESPN+		at Quinnipiac	L 67–81	7–11 (3–4)	People's United Center (1,989); Hamden, CT
January 26, 2020; 2:00 p.m., ESPN3		Canisius	W 63–55	8–11 (4–4)	Alumni Hall (2,479); Fairfield, CT
January 31, 2020; 7:00 p.m., ESPN3		at Rider	L 52–68	8–12 (4–5)	Alumni Gymnasium (1,612); Lawrenceville, NJ
February 4, 2020; 7:00 p.m., ESPN+		Monmouth	W 55–53	9–12 (5–5)	Webster Bank Arena (1,023); Bridgeport, CT
February 7, 2020; 7:00 p.m., ESPN3		at Siena	L 49–65	9–13 (5–6)	Times Union Center (6,581); Albany, NY
February 9, 2020; 2:00 p.m., ESPN+		Iona	L 54–78	9–14 (5–7)	Webster Bank Arena (1,531); Bridgeport, CT
February 14, 2020; 7:00 p.m., ESPN3		at Marist	W 57–53 ^{OT}	10–14 (6–7)	McCann Arena (1,100); Poughkeepsie, NY
February 16, 2020; 2:00 p.m., ESPN3		at Saint Peter's	L 44–61	10–15 (6–8)	Yanitelli Center (887); Jersey City, NJ
February 21, 2020; 7:00 p.m., ESPN3		Niagara	W 61–60	11–15 (7–8)	Alumni Hall (1,656); Fairfield, CT
February 23, 2020; 2:00 p.m., ESPN+		Siena	L 59–62	11–16 (7–9)	Alumni Hall (2,479); Fairfield, CT
February 28, 2020; 7:00 p.m., ESPN3		Quinnipiac	L 58–60	11–17 (7–10)	Alumni Hall (1,921); Fairfield, CT
March 1, 2020; 2:00 p.m., ESPN+		Rider	L 51–65	11–18 (7–11)	Alumni Hall (2,321); Fairfield, CT
March 4, 2020; 7:00 p.m., ESPN3		at Monmouth	L 45–69	11–19 (7–12)	OceanFirst Bank Center (1,752); West Long Branch, NJ
March 6, 2020; 7:00 p.m., ESPN3		at Manhattan	W 66–50	12–19 (8–12)	Draddy Gymnasium (1,002); The Bronx, NY
MAAC tournament
March 10, 2020; 5:00 p.m., ESPN3	(8)	vs. (9) Manhattan; First round	L 43–61	12–20	Boardwalk Hall (878); Atlantic City, NJ
*Non-conference game. ^{#}Rankings from AP poll. (#) Tournament seedings in parentheses. All times are in Eastern.
