= RaShawn Stores =

American basketball coach and player (born 1991)

Current position
- Title: Assistant coach
- Team: NJIT
- Conference: America East

Biographical details
- Born: April 5, 1991 (age 34); The Bronx, New York City, U.S.

Playing career
- 2012–2016: Manhattan

Coaching career (HC unless noted)
- 2017–2019: Manhattan (assistant)
- 2019–2022: Manhattan (associate HC)
- 2022–2023: Manhattan (interim HC)
- 2023–present: NJIT (assistant)

Head coaching record
- Overall: 12–18 (.400)

Accomplishments and honors

Awards
- MAAC All-Rookie Team (2013)

RaShawn Stores (born April 5, 1991) is an American basketball coach and player who is currently an assistant coach for the NJIT Highlanders basketball team. Stores was previously the interim head coach of the Manhattan Jaspers during the 2022–23 season. Stores also played basketball for Manhattan collegiately from 2012 to 2016.

== Early life ==
RaShawn Stores was born on April 5, 1991, to Latrebia Stores. Stores was raised in the Bronx and attended All Hallows High School where he played basketball, where he played with future college teammate and fellow coach Michael Alvarado. Stores also played one year of basketball for the Robinson School in New Jersey before his collegiate career.

== Playing career ==
Despite getting offers from colleges like the University of Massachusetts, University of Cincinnati, and St. Francis University, Stores chose to attend Manhattan College under coach Steve Masiello. Stores redshirt as a freshman and thus did not play any for his first year at Manhattan. In his first year of collegiate play at Manhattan, he was MAAC Rookie of the Week three times and ultimately was named to the MAAC All-Rookie team. In his sophomore year, Stores averaged slightly fewer points per game but started eleven more games than the previous year. The next year, Stores averaged his highest points per game up to this point and improved as the season progressed, helping Manhattan win the MAAC Championship game and reaching the 2015 NCAA Division I Tournament. In his senior and final year, Stores recorded his best stats from all his collegiate career and was nominated as a Lefty Driesell Defensive All-American.

== Coaching career ==
While playing his college basketball career at Manhattan, Stores was simultaneously working to achieve his bachelor's degree in business management which he received in 2015. After receiving his bachelor's, Stores then worked on receiving his master's degree in organizational leadership which he achieved in 2017. Following his completion of his bachelor's and master's degrees, Stores returned as a coach to the college he once played basketball for and began coaching for Manhattan under Masiello. In 2019, Stores was elevated to the role of associate head coach for Manhattan. Due to the unexpected sudden firing of Masiello, Stores was thrust into the role of the interim head coach just two weeks before the start of the 2022–23 Manhattan basketball season. Following his lone season as interim head coach for Manhattan, Stores became an assistant basketball coach for NJIT.

== Head coaching record ==
Statistics overview
Season	Team	Overall	Conference	Standing	Postseason
Manhattan Jaspers (MAAC) (2022–2023)
2022–23	Manhattan	12–18	10–10	T–5th	
Manhattan:		12–18 (.400)	10–10 (.500)		
Total:		12–18 (.400)			
National champion Postseason invitational champion Conference regular season champion Conference regular season and conference tournament champion Division regular season champion Division regular season and conference tournament champion Conference tournament champion
