= Canisius Golden Griffins men's basketball statistical leaders =

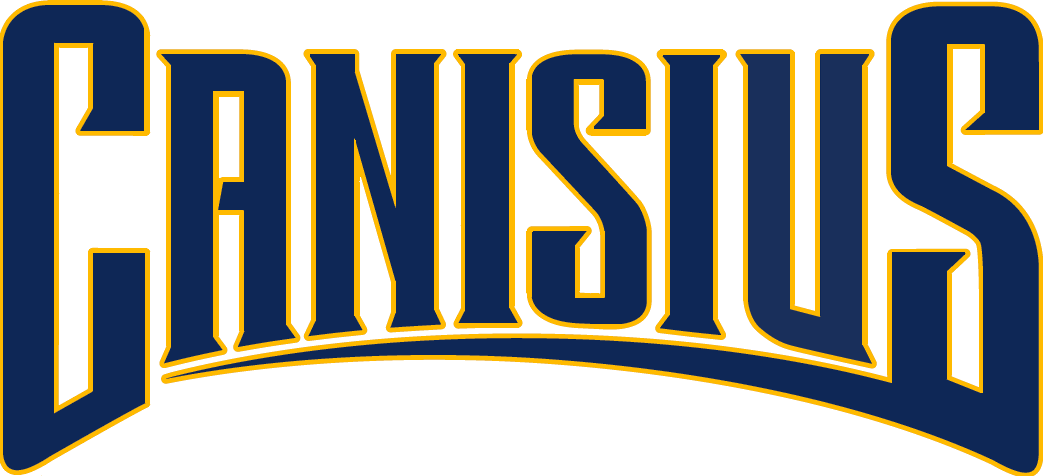

The Canisius Golden Griffins men's basketball statistical leaders are individual statistical leaders of the Canisius Golden Griffins men's basketball program in various categories, including points, rebounds, assists, steals, and blocks. Within those areas, the lists identify single-game, single-season, and career leaders. The Golden Griffins represent Canisius College in the NCAA Division I Metro Conference.

Canisius began competing in intercollegiate basketball in 1903. However, the school's record book does not generally list records from before the 1950s, as records from before this period are often incomplete and inconsistent. Since scoring was much lower in this era, and teams played much fewer games during a typical season, it is likely that few or no players from this era would appear on these lists anyway.

The NCAA did not officially record assists as a stat until the 1983–84 season, and blocks and steals until the 1985–86 season, but Canisius's record books includes players in these stats before these seasons. These lists are updated through the end of the 2020–21 season.

== Scoring ==
Career
Rk	Player	Points	Seasons
1	Ray Hall	2,226	1981–82 1982–83 1983–84 1984–85
2	Michael Meeks	1,827	1992–93 1993–94 1994–95 1995–96
3	Craig Wise	1,799	1991–92 1992–93 1993–94 1994–95
4	Frank Turner	1,769	2006–07 2007–08 2008–09 2009–10
5	Bill O'Connor	1,630	1960–61 1961–62 1962–63
6	Darrell Barley	1,587	1992–93 1993–94 1994–95 1995–96
	Jermaine Crumpton	1,587	2014–15 2015–16 2016–17 2017–18
8	Kevin Downey	1,583	2002–03 2003–04 2004–05 2005–06
9	Hank Nowak	1,449	1954–55 1955–56 1956–57
10	Robert Turner	1,415	1980–81 1981–82 1982–83 1983–84

Season
Rk	Player	Points	Season
1	Larry Fogle	835	1973–74
2	Billy Baron	821	2013–14
3	Ray Hall	628	1984–85
4	Ron Peaks	621	1978–79
5	Bill O'Connor	618	1962–63
6	Ray Hall	587	1983–84
7	Ron Peaks	586	1977–78
8	Billy Baron	584	2012–13
9	Paul McMillan IV	579	2024–25
10	Craig Wise	573	1994–95

Single game
Rk	Player	Points	Season	Opponent
1	Larry Fogle	55	1973–74	Saint Peter's
2	Larry Fogle	51	1973–74	George Washington
3	Andy Anderson	46	1966–67	La Salle
4	Larry Fogle	43	1973–74	Scranton
5	Larry Fogle	42	1973–74	Villanova
	Larry Fogle	42	1973–74	VCU
	Larry O'Connor	42	1952–53	John Carroll
8	Larry Fogle	41	1973–74	Niagara
	Larry Fogle	41	1973–74	Boston College
	Andy Anderson	41	1966–67	Murray State
	Bill O'Connor	41	1962–63	South Carolina

== Rebounds ==
Career
Rk	Player	Rebounds	Seasons
1	Hank Nowak	880	1954–55 1955–56 1956–57
2	Darren Fenn	852	1997–98 1998–99 1999–00 2000–01
3	Michael Meeks	838	1992–93 1993–94 1994–95 1995–96
4	Chris Manhertz	789	2010–11 2011–12 2012–13 2013–14
5	Craig Wise	784	1991–92 1992–93 1993–94 1994–95
6	Greg Logins	758	2007–08 2008–09 2009–10 2010–11
7	Bill O'Connor	736	1960–61 1961–62 1962–63
8	Joe Leone	729	1954–55 1955–56 1956–57
9	Darnell Wilson	702	2003–04 2004–05 2005–06 2006–07
10	Tomas Vazquez-Simmons	697	2007–08 2008–09 2009–10 2010–11

Season
Rk	Player	Rebounds	Season
1	Herm Hedderick	369	1951–52
2	Frank Mitchell	361	2023–24
3	Larry Fogle	351	1973–74
4	Larry O'Connor	346	1952–53
5	Hank Nowak	321	1955–56
6	Darren Fenn	315	1999–00
7	Hank Nowak	300	1956–57
8	Chris Manhertz	297	2012–13
9	Joe Leone	295	1956–57
10	Gary Lawrence	273	1971–72

Single game
Rk	Player	Rebounds	Season	Opponent
1	Larry Fogle	26	1973–74	Catholic

== Assists ==
Career
Rk	Player	Assists	Seasons
1	Malik Johnson	644	2016–17 2017–18 2018–19 2019–20
2	Frank Turner	616	2006–07 2007–08 2008–09 2009–10
3	Javone Moore	550	1993–94 1994–95 1995–96 1996–97
4	Brian Dux	508	1999–00 2000–01 2001–02 2002–03
5	Rodney Brown	453	1988–89 1989–90 1990–91 1991–92
6	Kevin Downey	404	2002–03 2003–04 2004–05 2005–06
7	Duke Richardson	372	1978–79 1979–80
8	Clive Bentick	354	1997–98 1998–99 1999–00 2000–01
9	Craig Wise	353	1991–92 1992–93 1993–94 1994–95
10	Billy Baron	351	2012–13 2013–14

Season
Rk	Player	Assists	Season
1	Duke Richardson	215	1978–79
2	Jim Schofield	198	1973–74
3	Malik Johnson	189	2019–20
4	Frank Turner	182	2009–10
5	Javone Moore	180	1996–97
6	Billy Baron	180	2013–14
7	Billy Baron	171	2012–13
8	Frank Turner	167	2006–07
9	Javone Moore	165	1995–96
10	Javone Moore	161	1994–95

Single game
Rk	Player	Assists	Season	Opponent
1	Jim Schofield	15	1973–74	Saint Peter's

== Steals ==
Career
Rk	Player	Steals	Seasons
1	Ray Hall	219	1981–82 1982–83 1983–84 1984–85
2	Craig Wise	218	1991–92 1992–93 1993–94 1994–95
3	Malik Johnson	202	2016–17 2017–18 2018–19 2019–20
4	Frank Turner	193	2006–07 2007–08 2008–09 2009–10
5	Rodney Brown	188	1988–89 1989–90 1990–91 1991–92
6	Dana Johnson	183	1990–91 1991–92 1992–93 1993–94
7	Brian Smith	161	1984–85 1985–86 1986–87 1987–88
8	Chuck Harris	154	2003–04 2004–05 2005–06 2006–07
9	Isaiah Reese	152	2016–17 2017–18 2018–19
10	Kevin Downey	147	2002–03 2003–04 2004–05 2005–06

Season
Rk	Player	Steals	Season
1	Dana Johnson	79	1992–93
2	Isaiah Reese	73	2017–18
	Craig Wise	73	1994–95
4	Rodney Brown	70	1991–92
5	Frank Turner	66	2009–10
6	Ray Hall	65	1983–84
7	Malik Johnson	64	2019–20
8	Craig Wise	59	1993–94
	Anthony Benard	59	2024–25
10	Billy Baron	56	2013–14
	Dana Johnson	56	1993–94

Single gamev
Rk	Player	Steals	Season	Opponent
1	Harry Seymour	9	1990–91	Vermont

== Blocks ==
Career
Rk	Player	Blocks	Seasons
1	Tomas Vazquez-Simmons	273	2007–08 2008–09 2009–10 2010–11
2	Michael Meeks	183	1992–93 1993–94 1994–95 1995–96
3	Mike Smrek	172	1981–82 1982–83 1983–84 1984–85
4	Darnell Wilson	144	2003–04 2004–05 2005–06 2006–07
5	Mike Brown	141	1986–87 1987–88
6	Ed Book	139	1988–89 1989–90 1990–91 1991–92
7	Darren Fenn	132	1997–98 1998–99 1999–00 2000–01
8	Jordan Heath	125	2012–13 2013–14
9	Elton Frazier	108	2007–08 2008–09 2009–10 2010–11
10	Chris Heinold	96	1983–84 1984–85 1985–86 1986–87

Season
Rk	Player	Blocks	Season
1	Mike Brown	100	1987–88
2	Tomas Vazquez-Simmons	84	2007–08
3	Tomas Vazquez-Simmons	74	2009–10
4	Jordan Heath	72	2013–14
5	Tomas Vazquez-Simmons	62	2010–11
6	Mike Smrek	54	1983–84
7	Tomas Vazquez-Simmons	53	2008–09
	Jordan Heath	53	2012–13
9	Mike Smrek	52	1984–85
10	Michael Meeks	51	1994–95

Single game
Rk	Player	Blocks	Season	Opponent
1	Jordan Heath	9	2013–14	Rider
