= Metro Conference Men's Basketball Player of the Year =

Men's college basketball award

- Awarded for: the most outstanding male basketball player in the Metro Conference (formerly MAAC)
- Country: United States

History
- First award: 1982
- Most recent: Kevair Kennedy, Merrimack

The Metro Conference Men's Basketball Player of the Year, formerly called the Metro Atlantic Athletic Conference Men's Basketball Player of the Year, is an award given to the men's basketball player in the Metro Conference voted as the most outstanding player. The award was first presented following the 1981–82 season, the first season, through voting by the league's head coaches. The award was first given to William Brown of Saint Peter's.

The conference was rebranded as the Metro Conference on July 1, 2026. It should not be confused with the other Metro Conference which operated from 1975 to 1995 before merging with the Great Midwest Conference to form the current Conference USA.

Lionel Simmons of La Salle won the award a league record three times in his career. Simmons, along with winning his third MAAC Player of the Year award, was also the consensus national player of the year in 1990. As of 2024, three players have won the award twice in their career: Steve Burtt of Iona, Luis Flores of Manhattan and Justin Robinson of Monmouth.

There has been one tie in the award's history, in 2017–18 when the award was shared between the two MAAC Buffalo-based schools, with Jermaine Crumpton of Canisius and Kahlil Dukes of Niagara both sharing the honor. Iona has produced the most players in the league to win the award with 10. Siena is a close second, with seven players winning. The only current Metro members without a winner are Mount St. Mary's, which joined the conference in 2022–23, and Sacred Heart, which joined in 2024–25.

== Key ==
†	Co-Players of the Year
*	Awarded a national player of the year award that same season: UPI College Basketball Player of the Year (1954–55 to 1995–96); Oscar Robertson Trophy (1958–59 to present); Naismith College Player of the Year (1968–69 to present); John R. Wooden Award (1976–77 to present)
Player (X)	Denotes the number of times the player has been awarded the Metro Player of the Year award at that point

== Winners ==
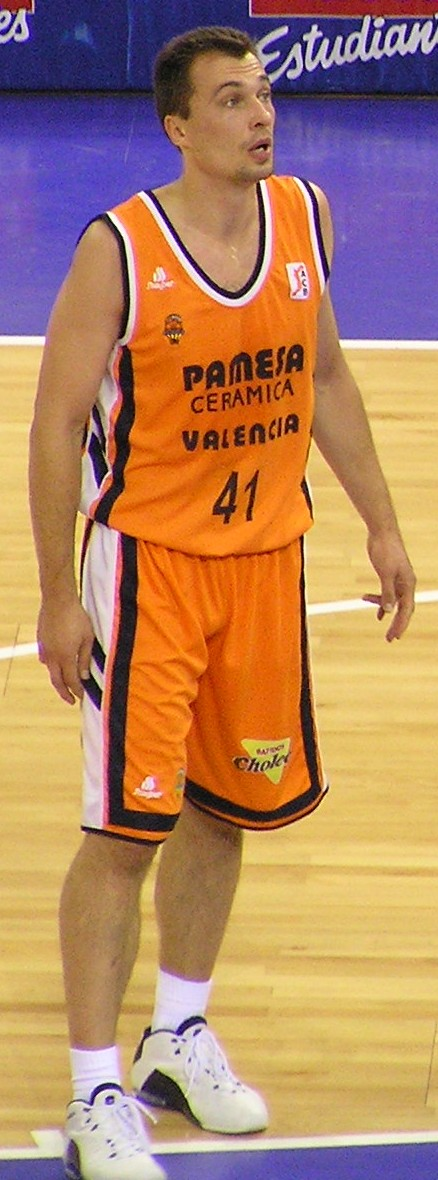
Mindaugas Timinskas, Iona, 1997

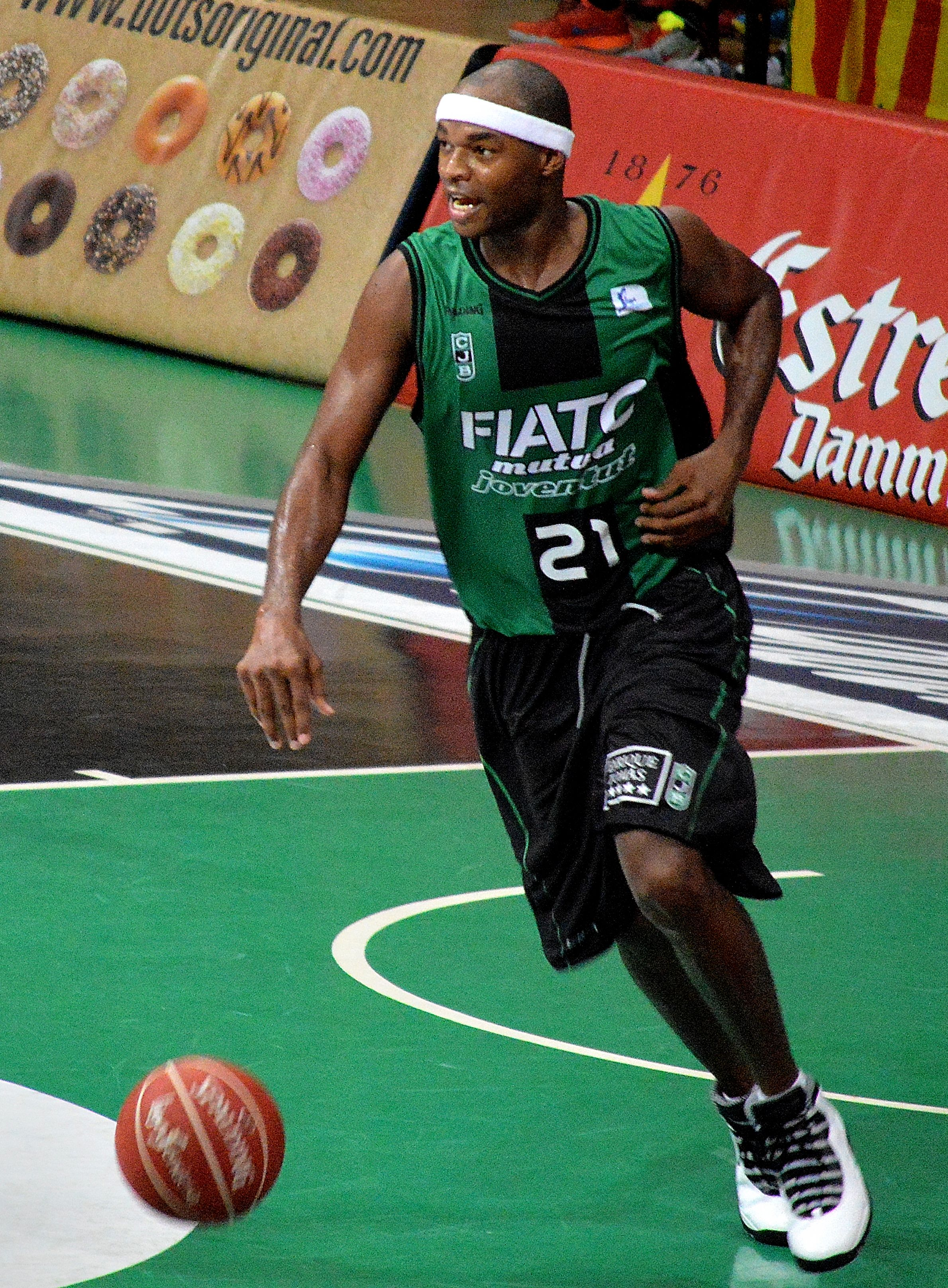
Tariq Kirksay, Iona, 2000

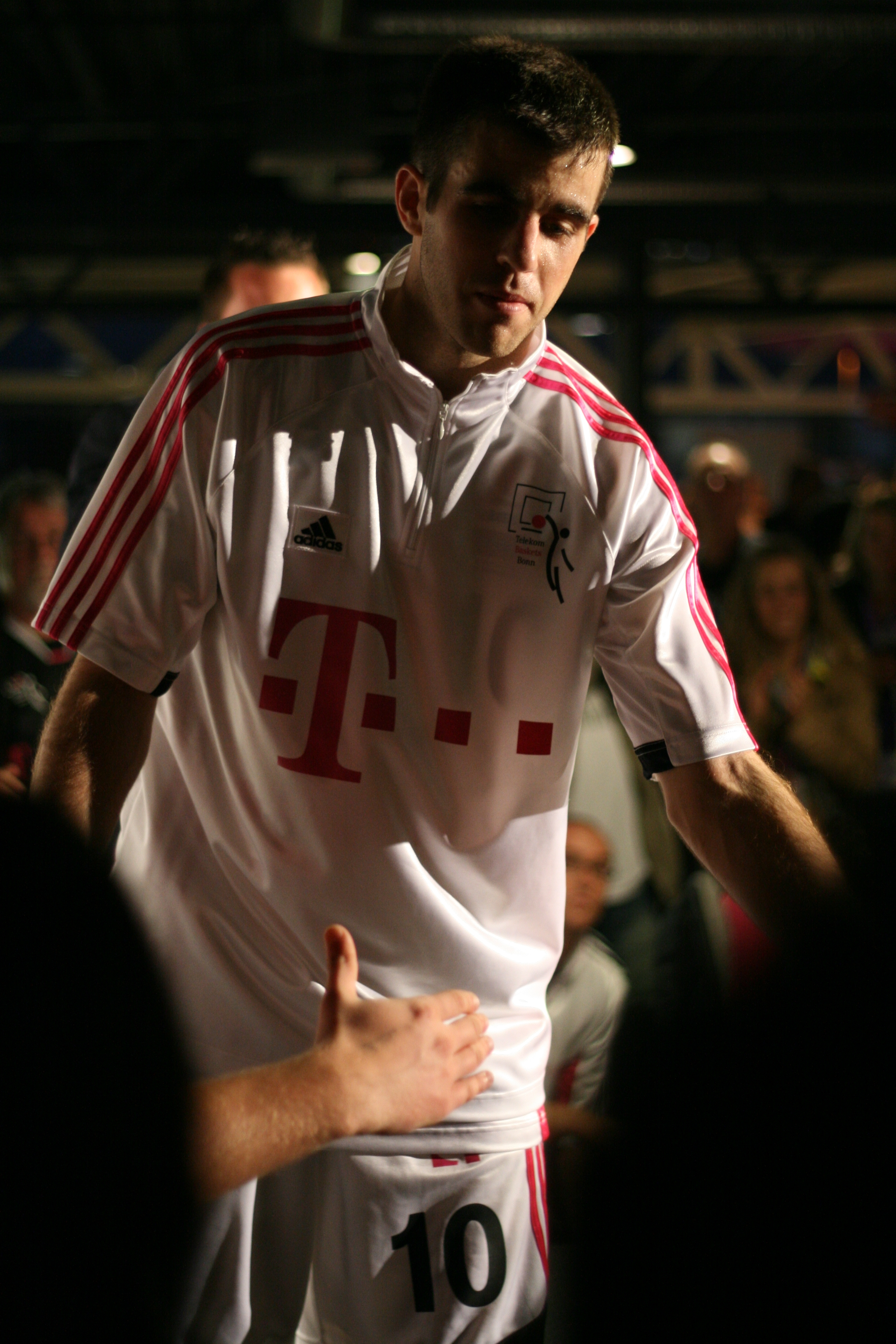
Jared Jordan, Marist, 2007

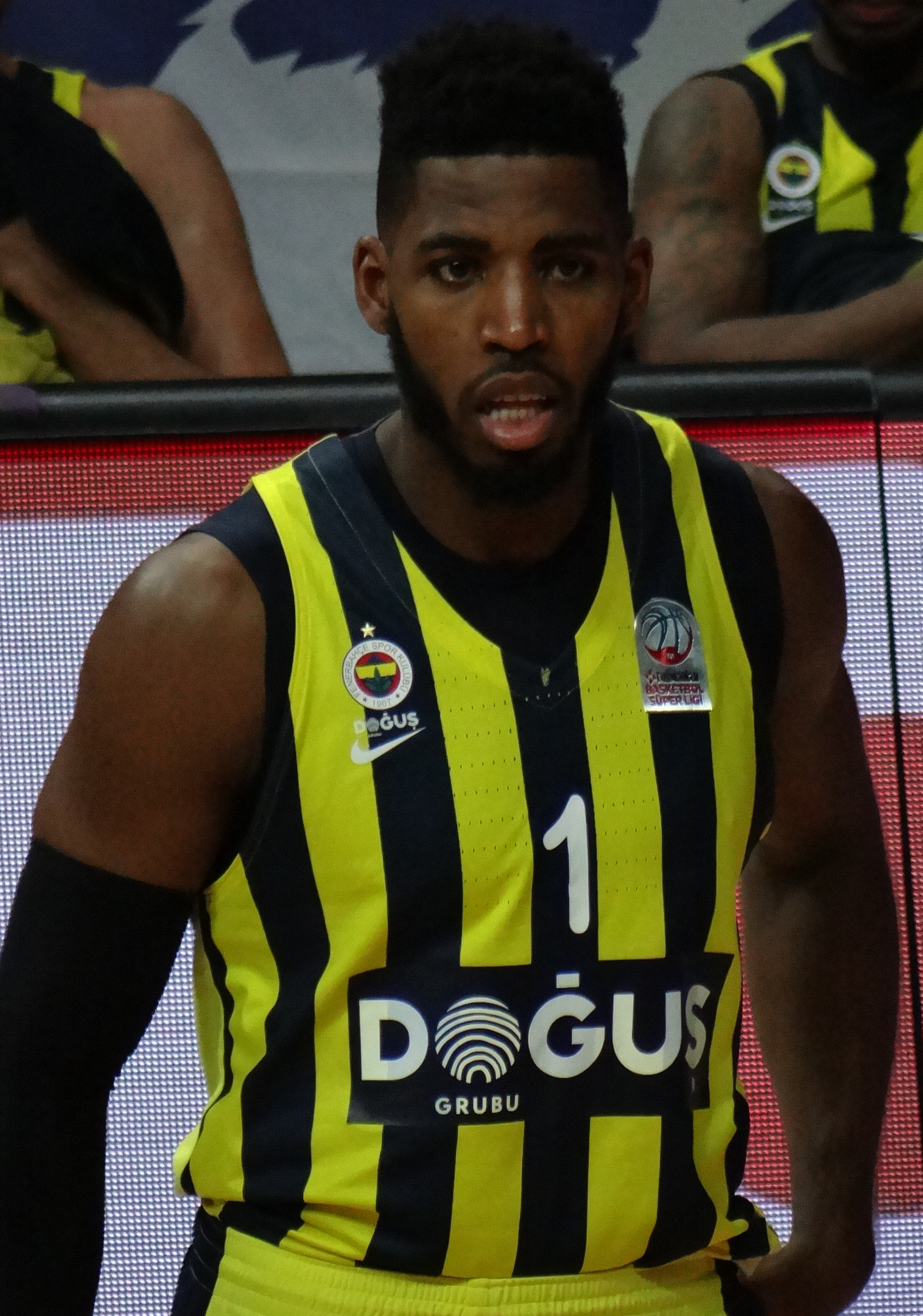
Jason Thompson, Rider, 2008

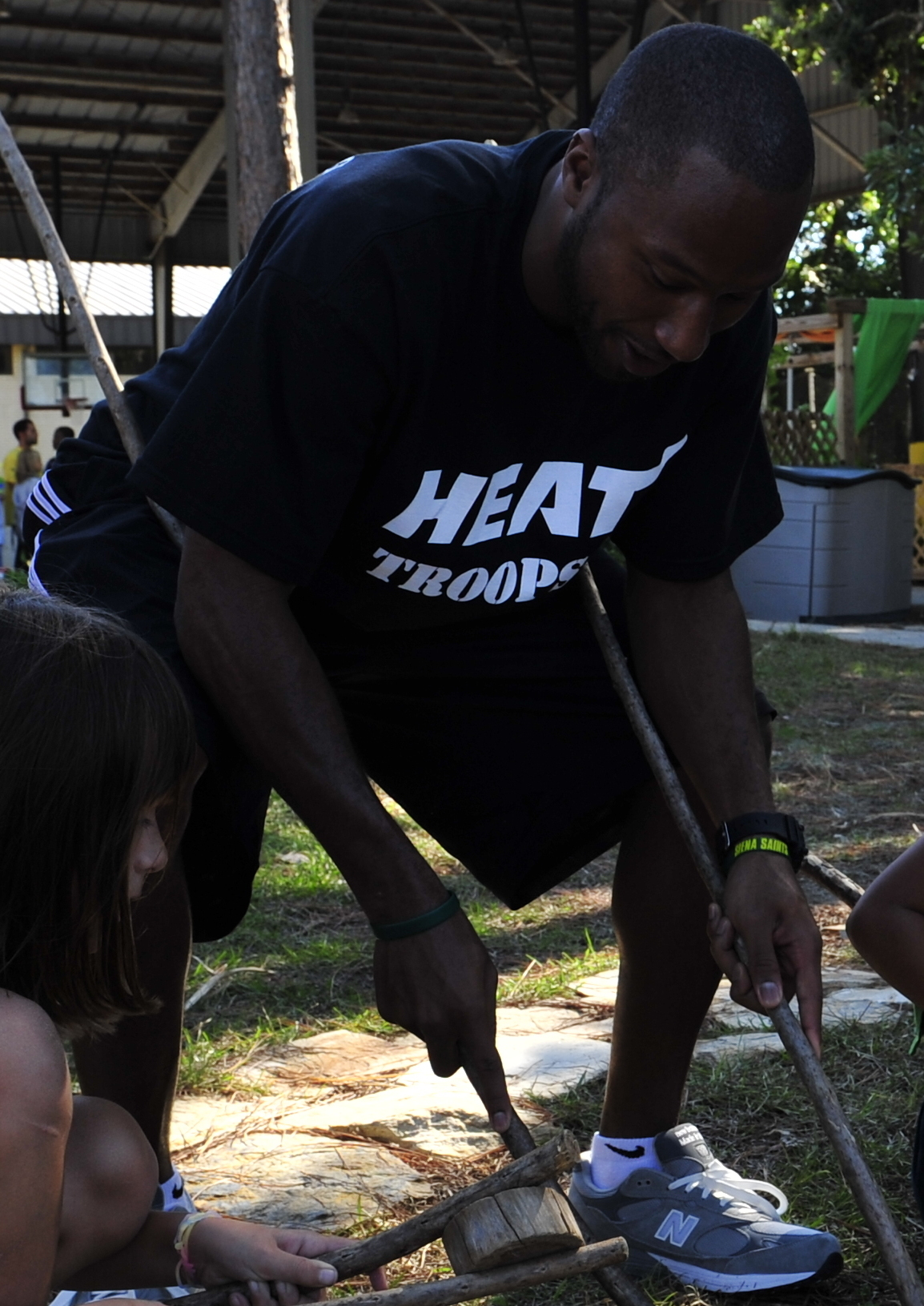
Kenny Hasbrouck, Siena, 2009

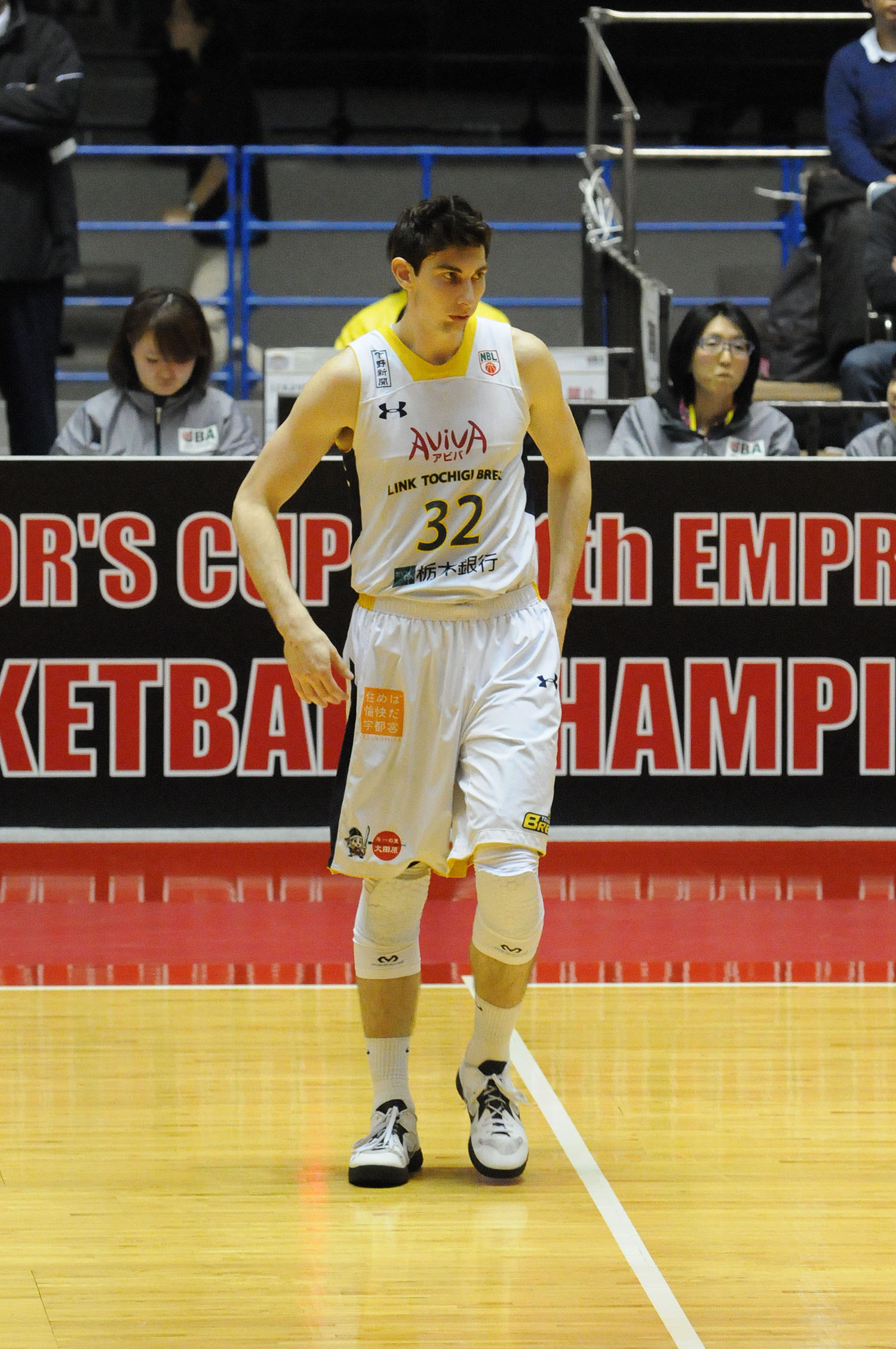
Ryan Rossiter, Siena, 2011

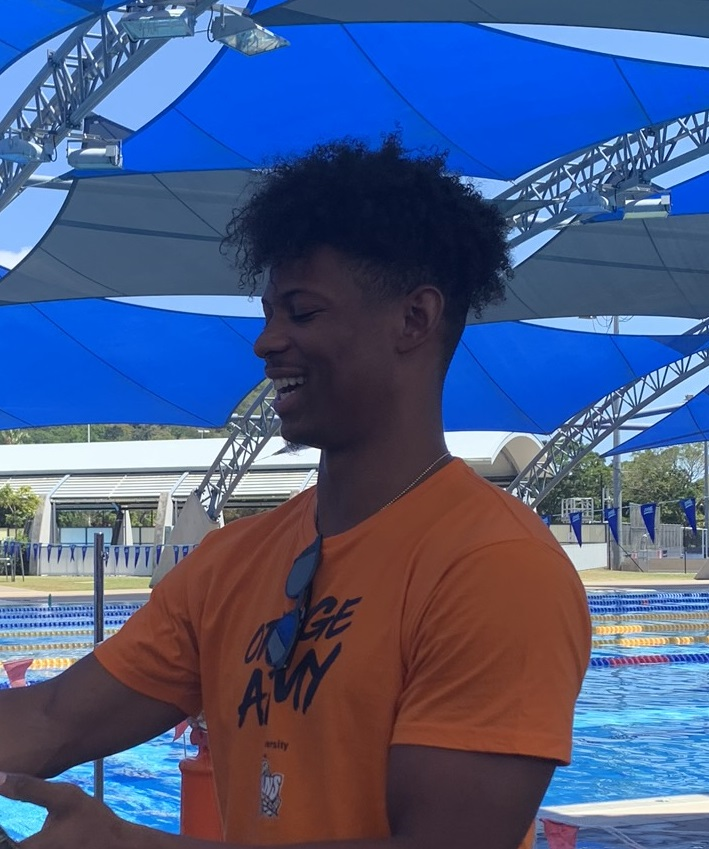
Scott Machado, Iona, 2012

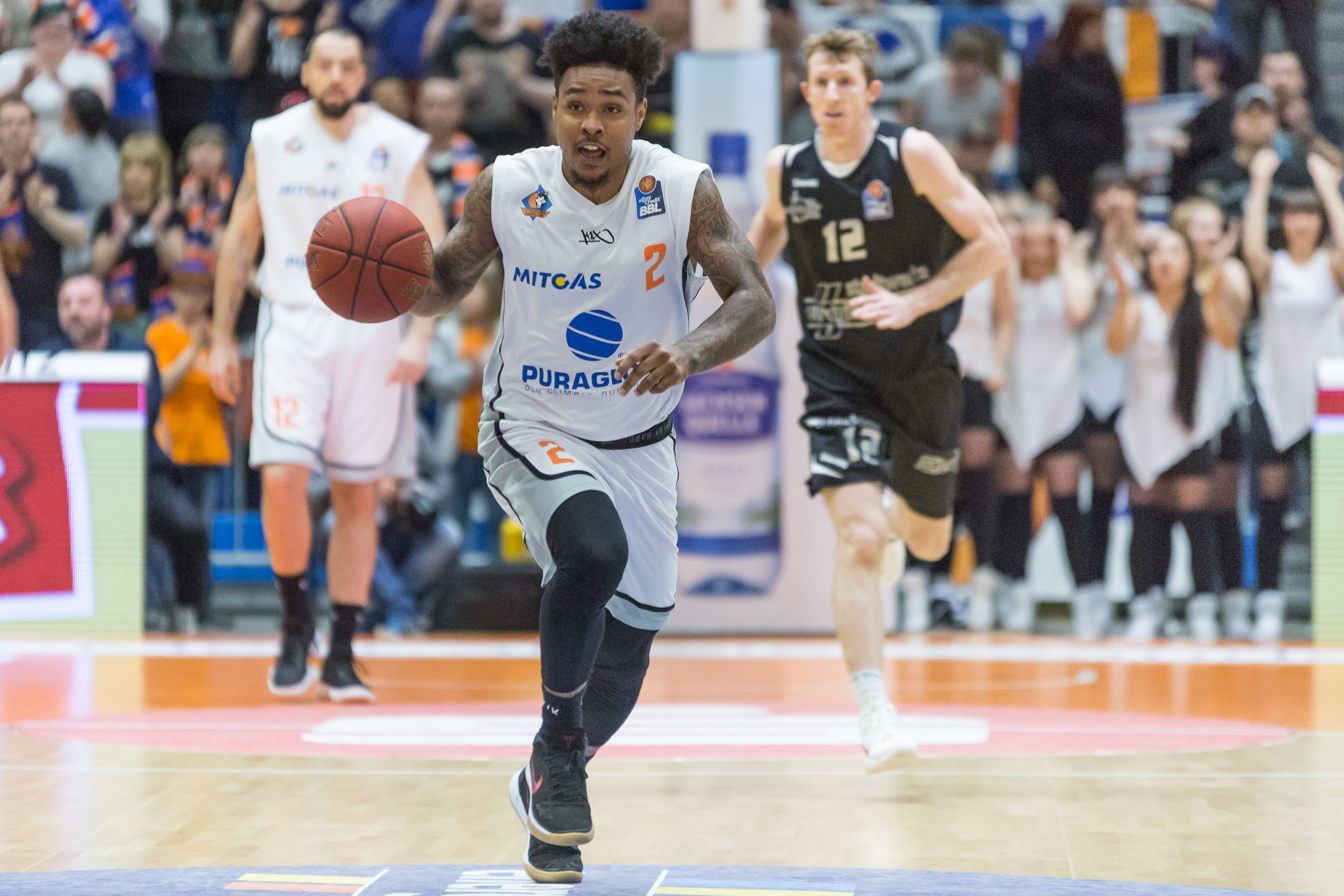
Lamont Jones, Iona, 2013

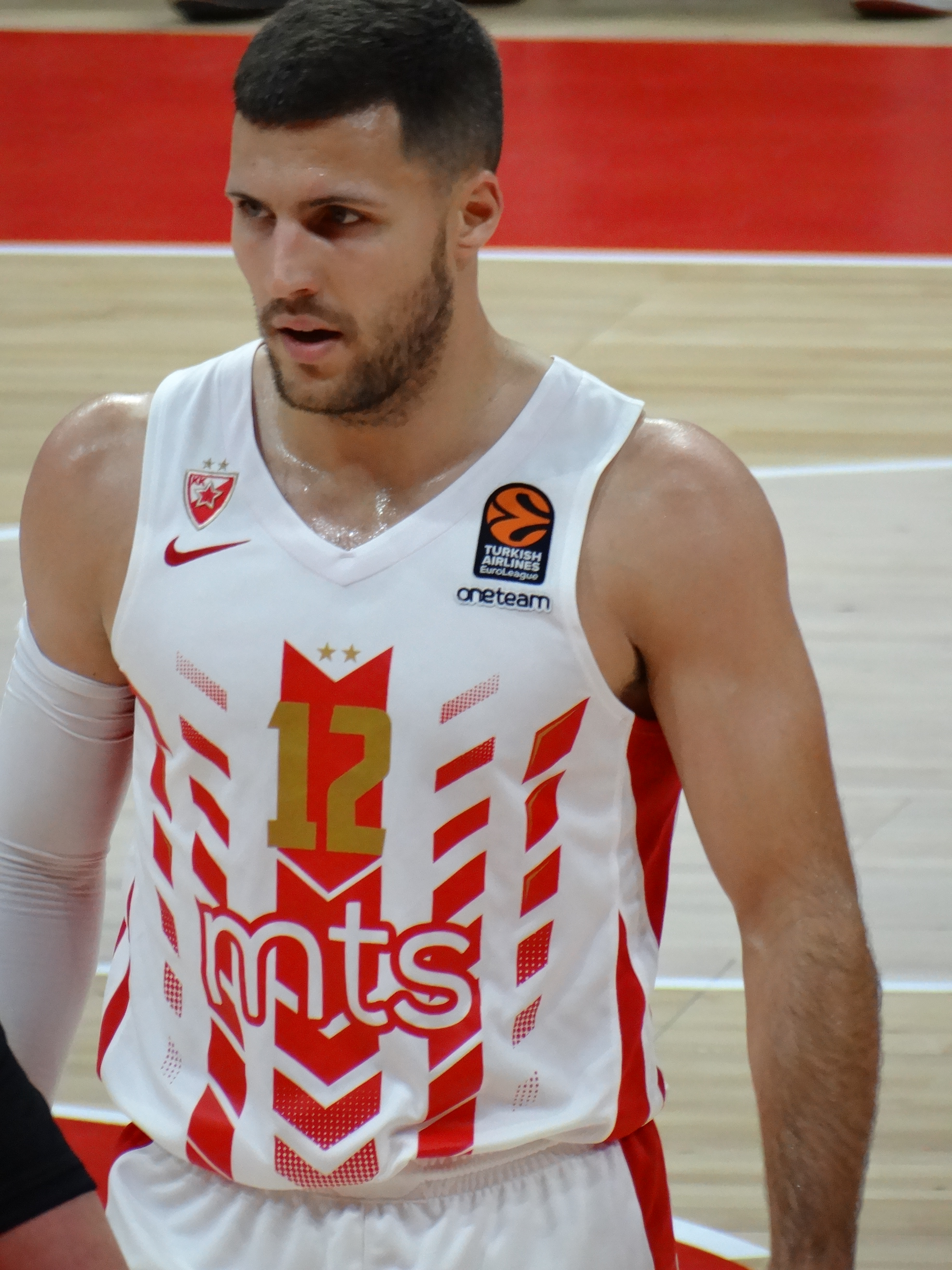
Billy Baron, Canisius, 2014

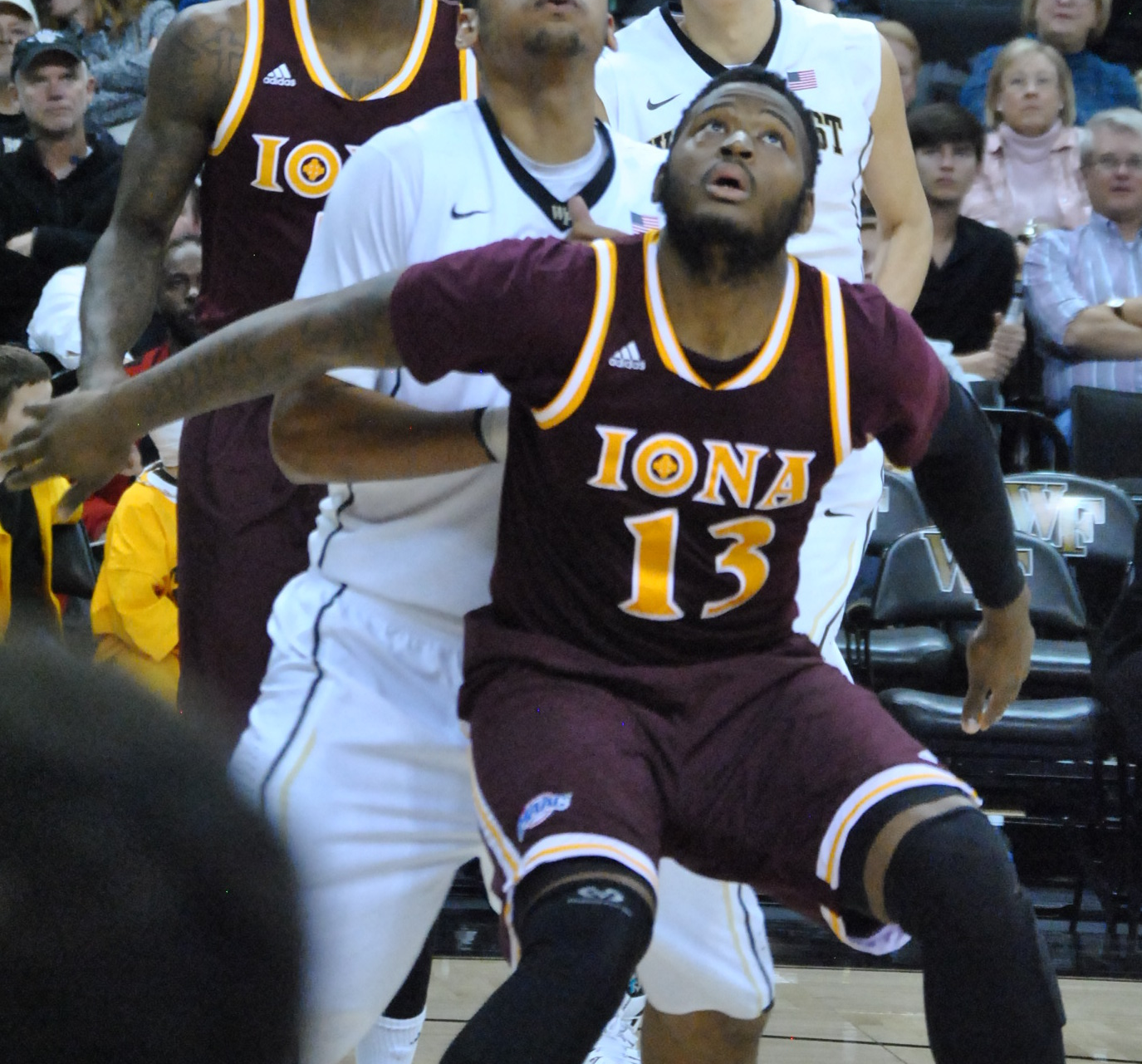
David Laury, Iona, 2015

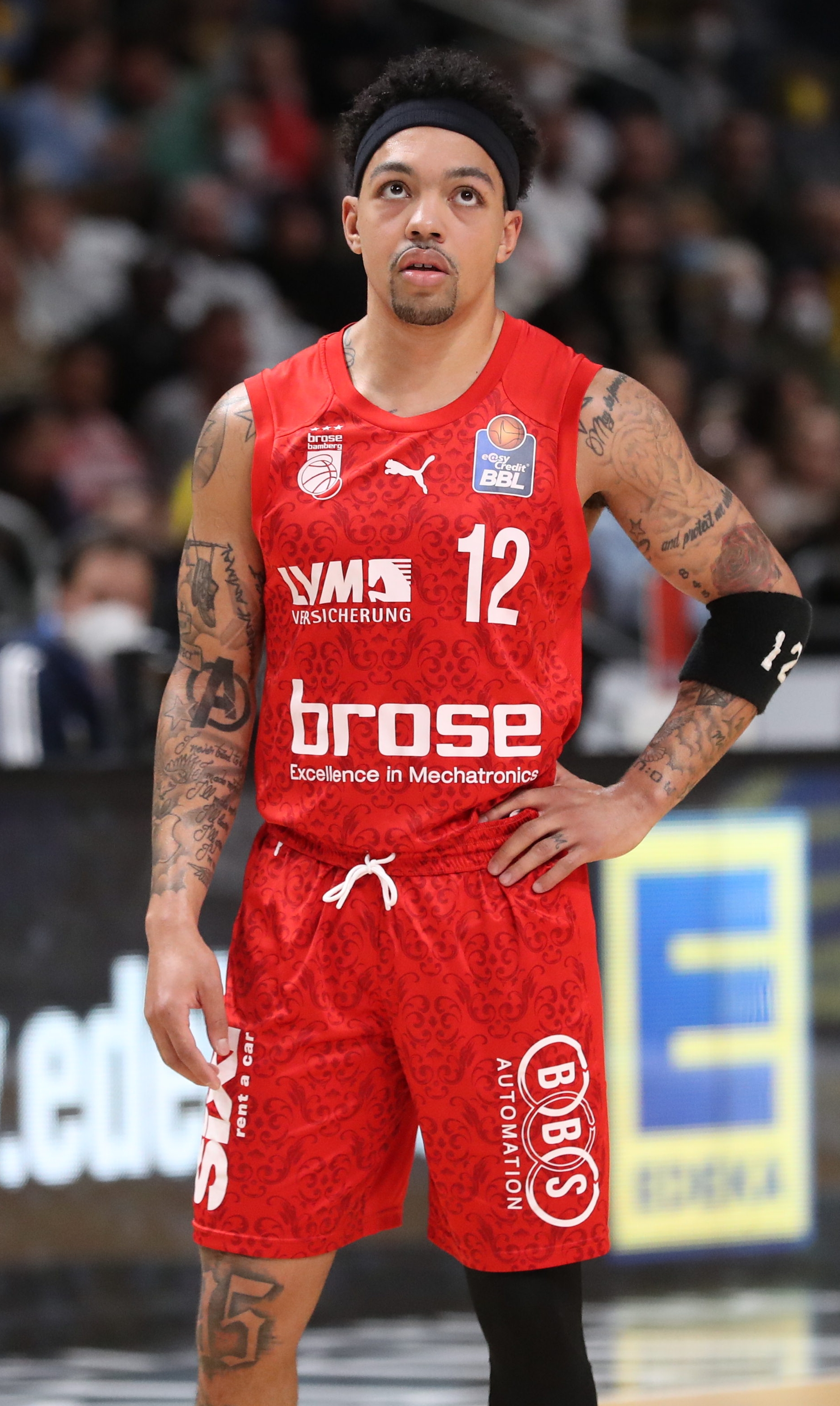
Justin Robinson, Monmouth, 2016 and 2017

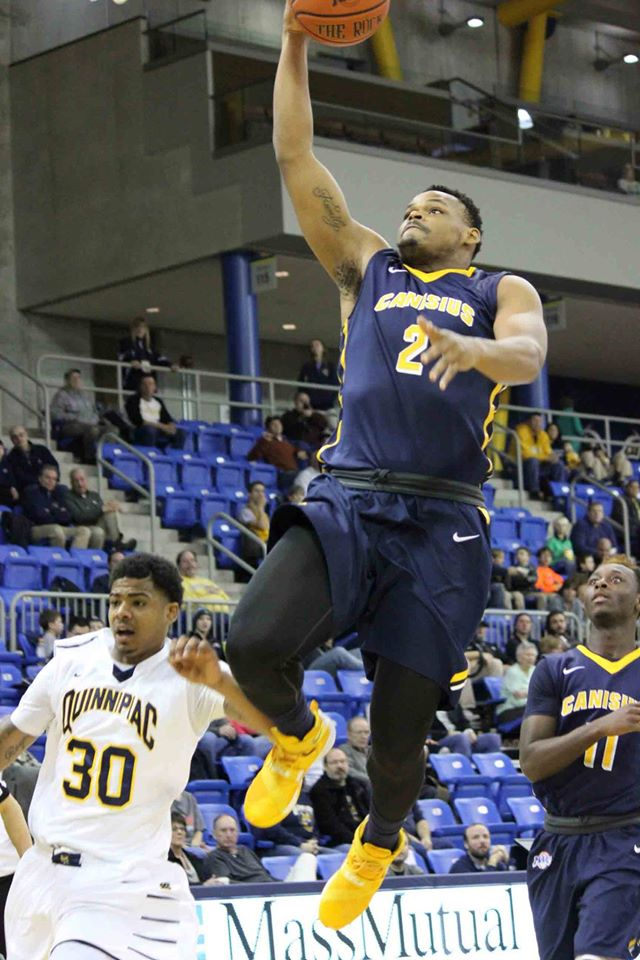
Jermaine Crumpton, Canisius, 2018

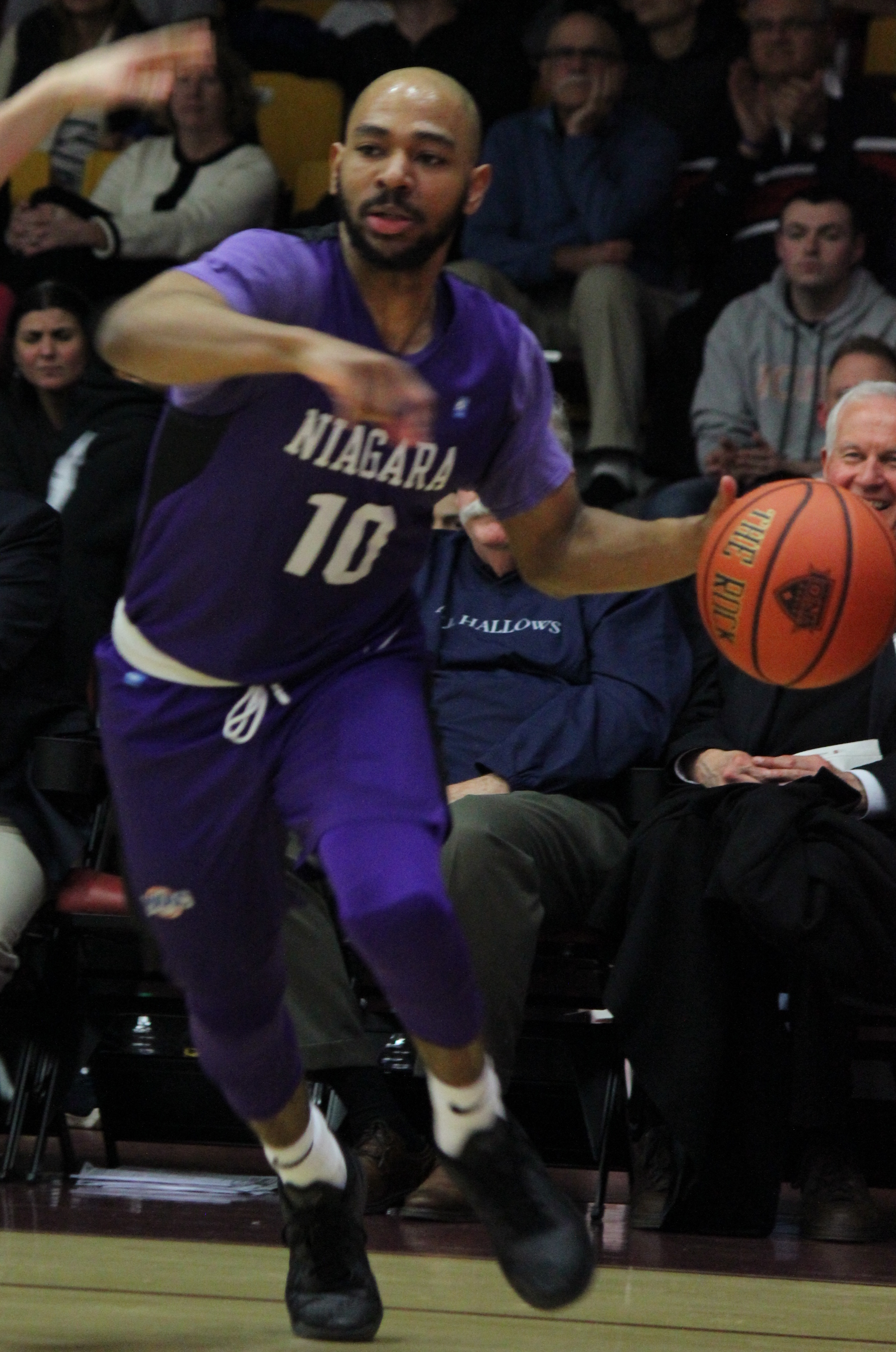
Kahlil Dukes, Niagara, 2018

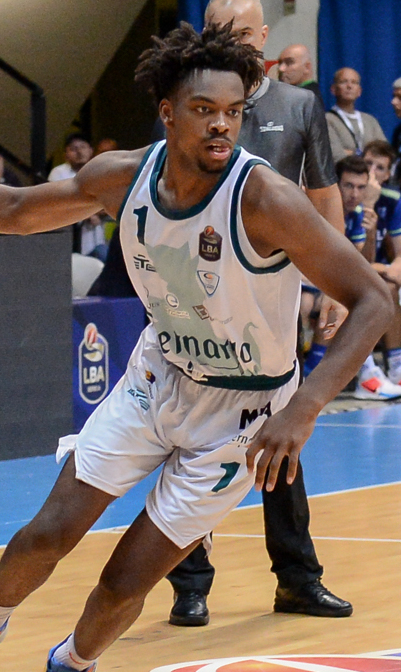
Cameron Young, Quinnipiac, 2019

Season	Player	School	Position	Class	Reference
1981–82	William Brown	Saint Peter's	G	Senior	
1982–83	Steve Burtt	Iona	PG	Junior	
1983–84	Steve Burtt (2)	Iona	PG	Senior	
1984–85	Randy Cozzens	Army	G	Senior	
1985–86	Tony George	Fairfield	G	Senior	
1986–87	Kevin Houston	Army	PG/SG	Senior	
1987–88	Lionel Simmons	La Salle	SF	Sophomore	
1988–89	Lionel Simmons (2)	La Salle	SF	Junior	
1989–90	Lionel Simmons* (3)	La Salle	SF	Senior	
1990–91	Marc Brown	Siena	PG	Senior	
1991–92	Randy Woods	La Salle	PG	Senior	
1992–93	Keith Bullock	Manhattan	F	Senior	
1993–94	Doremus Bennerman	Siena	PG	Senior	
1994–95	Craig Wise	Canisius	F	Senior	
1995–96	Darrell Barley	Canisius	F	Senior	
1996–97	Mindaugas Timinskas	Iona	SF	Senior	
1997–98	Kashif Hameed	Iona	C/PF	Junior	
1998–99	Alvin Young	Niagara	SG	Senior	
1999–00	Tariq Kirksay	Iona	SG/SF	Senior	
2000–01	Demond Stewart	Niagara	SG	Senior	
2001–02	Mario Porter	Rider	SF	Senior	
2002–03	Luis Flores	Manhattan	PG	Junior	
2003–04	Luis Flores (2)	Manhattan	PG	Senior	
2004–05	Juan Mendez	Niagara	C/PF	Senior	
2005–06	Keydren Clark	Saint Peter's	PG	Senior	
2006–07	Jared Jordan	Marist	PG	Senior	
2007–08	Jason Thompson	Rider	C	Senior	
2008–09	Kenny Hasbrouck	Siena	SG	Senior	
2009–10	Alex Franklin	Siena	SF	Senior	
2010–11	Ryan Rossiter	Siena	PF	Senior	
2011–12	Scott Machado	Iona	PG	Senior	
2012–13	Lamont Jones	Iona	SG	Senior	
2013–14	Billy Baron	Canisius	PG	Senior	
2014–15	David Laury	Iona	PF	Senior	
2015–16	Justin Robinson	Monmouth	PG	Junior	
2016–17	Justin Robinson (2)	Monmouth	PG	Senior	
2017–18^{†}	Jermaine Crumpton	Canisius	SF	Senior	
2017–18^{†}	Kahlil Dukes	Niagara	PG	Senior	
2018–19	Cameron Young	Quinnipiac	SG	Senior	
2019–20	Jalen Pickett	Siena	PG	Sophomore	
2020–21	Manny Camper	Siena	SG/SF	Senior	
2021–22	Tyson Jolly	Iona	SG	Graduate	
2022–23	Walter Clayton Jr.	Iona	PG	Sophomore	
2023–24	Matt Balanc	Quinnipiac	SG	Graduate	
2024–25	Amarri Monroe	Quinnipiac	SF	Junior	
2025–26	Kevair Kennedy	Merrimack	PG	Freshman	

== Winners by school ==
School (year joined)	Winners	Years
Iona (1981)	10	1983, 1984, 1997, 1998, 2000, 2012, 2013, 2015, 2022, 2023
Siena (1989)	7	1991, 1994, 2009, 2010, 2011, 2020, 2021
Canisius (1989)	4	1995, 1996, 2014, 2018^{†}
La Salle (1981) (Note: La Salle left for the Atlantic 10 Conference in 1995.)	4	1988, 1989, 1990, 1992
Niagara (1989)	4	1999, 2001, 2005, 2018^{†}
Manhattan (1981)	3	1993, 2003, 2004
Quinnipiac (2013)	3	2019, 2024, 2025
Army (1981) (Note: Army was a charter member in 1981, but left for the Patriot League in 1990.)	2	1985, 1987
Monmouth (2013) (Note: Monmouth left for the Colonial Athletic Association, now known as the Coastal Athletic Association, in July 2022.)	2	2016, 2017
Rider (1995)	2	2002, 2008
Saint Peter's (1981)	2	1982, 2006
Fairfield (1981) (Note: Fairfield will leave for the Coastal Athletic Association in July 2027.)	1	1986
Marist (1995)	1	2007
Merrimack (2024)	1	2026
Loyola (MD) (1989) (Note: Loyola left for the Patriot League in 2013.)	0	—
Mount St. Mary's (2022)	0	—
Sacred Heart (2024)	0	—

== See also ==
- Metro Conference Men's Basketball Coach of the Year
- Metro Conference Men's Basketball Rookie of the Year
