= Bromwell =

Bromwell is a surname. Notable people with the surname include:

- Eric M. Bromwell (b. 1976), Maryland politician
- Henry P. H. Bromwell (1823–1903), Illinois politician, Freemason, and author of the book Restorations of Masonic Geometry and Symbolry.
- Jacob H. Bromwell (1848–1924), Ohio politician
- James E. Bromwell (1920–2009), Iowa politician
- Perry Bromwell (b. circa 1964), American basketball player and coach
- Thomas L. Bromwell (b. 1949), convicted Maryland politician

Fictional characters:

- Roy Bromwell, character in the video game Rival Schools

== See also ==
- Bromwell High, fictional animated British high school
