= Metro Conference Men's Basketball Rookie of the Year =

- Awarded for: the most outstanding rookie basketball player in the Metro Conference (formerly MAAC)
- Country: United States
- First award: 1981
- Currently held by: Kevair Kennedy, Merrimack

The Metro Conference Men's Basketball Rookie of the Year, formerly named the Metro Atlantic Athletic Conference Men's Basketball Rookie of the Year, is a basketball award given to one or more of the Metro Conference's best men's basketball players in their first year of competitive play, as voted on by the coaches in the conference. The award was first given following the 1981–82 season, the first year of the conference's existence, to Tim Cain of Manhattan.

The MAAC was rebranded as the Metro Conference on July 1, 2026. It is not to be confused with the other Metro Conference which operated from 1975 to 1995 before merging with the Great Midwest Conference to form the current Conference USA.

== Key ==
†	Co-Players of the Year

== Winners ==
Season	Player	School	Position	Class	Ref.
1981–82	Tim Cain	Manhattan	Forward	Freshman	
1982–83	Perry Bromwell	Manhattan	Guard	Freshman	
1983–84	Kevin Houston	Army	PG/SG	Freshman	
1984–85^{†}	Richie Simmonds	Iona	Guard	Freshman	
1984–85^{†}	Leo Parent	Manhattan	Center	Freshman	
1985–86	Joe Paterno	Fordham	Forward	Freshman	
1986–87	Lionel Simmons	La Salle	SF	Freshman	
1987–88	Derrick Canada	Army	Guard	Freshman	
1988–89	Jack Hurd	La Salle	Forward	Freshman	
1989–90	Keith Bullock	Manhattan	Forward	Freshman	
1990–91	Brian Clifford	Niagara	Forward	Freshman	
1991–92^{†}	Harun Ramey	Saint Peter's	Forward	Freshman	
1991–92^{†}	Craig Wise	Canisius	Forward	Freshman	
1992–93	Michael Meeks	Canisius	Center	Freshman	
1993–94	Jason Hoover	Manhattan	Forward	Freshman	
1994–95	Heshimu Evans	Manhattan	Forward	Freshman	
1995–96	Nsilo Abraham	Loyola (MD)	Forward	Freshman	
1996–97	Ricky Bellinger	Saint Peter's	Guard	Freshman	
1997–98	Scott Knapp	Siena	Guard	Freshman	
1998–99	Jermaine Clark	Fairfield	Guard	Freshman	
1999–00	Bruce Seals	Manhattan	Guard	Freshman	
2000–01	John Reimold	Loyola (MD)	Forward	Freshman	
2001–02	Jerry Johnson	Rider	Guard	Freshman	
2002–03	Keydren Clark	Saint Peter's	Guard	Freshman	
2003–04	Shane Nichols	Saint Peter's	Guard	Freshman	
2004–05	CJ Anderson	Manhattan	Guard	Freshman	
2005–06	Kenny Hasbrouck	Siena	Guard	Freshman	
2006–07^{†}	Edwin Ubiles	Siena	Forward	Freshman	
2006–07^{†}	Frank Turner	Canisius	Guard	Freshman	
2007–08^{†}	Jay Gavin	Marist	Guard	Freshman	
2007–08^{†}	Brian Rudolph	Loyola (MD)	Guard	Freshman	
2008–09	Scott Machado	Iona	Guard	Freshman	
2009–10	Derek Needham	Fairfield	Guard	Freshman	
2010–11	Danny Stewart	Rider	Forward	Freshman	
2011–12	Juan'ya Green	Niagara	Guard	Freshman	
2012–13^{†}	Amadou Sidibé	Fairfield	Center	Freshman	
2012–13^{†}	Shane Richards	Manhattan	Forward	Freshman	
2013–14	Khalid Hart	Marist	Guard	Freshman	
2014–15	Schadrac Casimir	Iona	Guard	Freshman	
2015–16	Micah Seaborn	Monmouth	Guard	Freshman	
2016–17	Mikey Dixon	Quinnipiac	Guard	Freshman	
2017–18	Takal Molson	Canisius	Guard	Freshman	
2018–19	Jalen Pickett	Siena	Guard	Freshman	
2019–20	Aaron Estrada	Saint Peter's	Guard	Freshman	
2020–21	Nelly Junior Joseph	Iona	Forward	Freshman	
2021–22	Jao Ituka	Marist	Guard	Freshman	
2022–23	Michael Eley	Siena	Guard	Freshman	
2023–24	De'Shayne Montgomery	Mount St. Mary’s	Guard	Freshman	
2024–25	Will Sydnor	Manhattan	Forward	Freshman	
2025–26	Kevair Kennedy	Merrimack	Guard	Freshman	

== Winners by school ==
School (year joined)	Winners	Years
Manhattan (1981)	10	1982, 1983, 1985^{†}, 1990, 1994, 1995, 2000, 2005, 2013, 2025
Saint Peter's (1981)	5	1992^{†}, 1997, 2003, 2004, 2020
Iona (1981)	4	1985^{†}, 2009, 2015, 2021
Canisius (1989)	4	1992^{†}, 1993, 2007^{†}, 2018
Siena (1989)	4	1998, 2006, 2007^{†}, 2019
Fairfield (1981)	3	1999, 2010, 2013^{†}
Loyola (MD) (1989) (Note: Loyola (MD) left for the Patriot League in 2013.)	3	1996, 2001, 2008^{†}
Marist (1997)	3	2008^{†}, 2014, 2022
Army (1981) (Note: The United States Military Academy (Army) left for the Patriot League in 1990.)	2	1984, 1988
La Salle (1983) (Note: La Salle left for the Midwestern Collegiate Conference, now known as the Horizon League, in 1992. It is now a member of the Atlantic 10 Conference.)	2	1987, 1989
Niagara (1989)	2	1991, 2012
Rider (1997)	2	2002, 2011
Fordham (1981) (Note: Fordham left for the Patriot League in 1990. It is now in the Atlantic 10 Conference.)	1	1986
Merrimack (2024)	1	2026
Monmouth (2013) (Note: Monmouth left for the Colonial Athletic Association, now known as the Coastal Athletic Association, in 2022.)	1	2016
Mount St. Mary's (2022)	1	2024
Quinnipiac (2013)	1	2017
Holy Cross (1983) (Note: Holy Cross left for the Patriot League in 1990, and remains in that conference today.)	0	—
Sacred Heart (2024)	0	—
