= Matt Balanc =

American basketball player

Horsens IC
- Position: Shooting guard
- League: Basketligaen

Personal information
- Listed height: 6 ft 4 in (1.93 m)
- Listed weight: 195 lb (88 kg)

Career information
- High school: Springbrook (White Oak, Maryland)
- College: Quinnipiac (2019–2024)
- NBA draft: 2024: undrafted
- Playing career: 2024–present

Career history
- 2024–present: Horsens IC

Career highlights
- MAAC Player of the Year (2024); First-team All-MAAC (2024); Second-team All-MAAC (2022)

Matthew Balanc is an American basketball player. He played college basketball for the Quinnipiac Bobcats of the Metro Atlantic Athletic Conference.

== Early life ==
Balanc attended Springbrook High School in Maryland. As a senior, he averaged 17.6 points per game. Balanc committed to play college basketball at Quinnipiac, choosing the Bobcats over UMBC, Florida Gulf Coast, Rhode Island, and UMass.

== College career ==
Balanc redshirted his true freshman season, and averaged 7.3 points per game as a redshirt freshman. His playing time declined as a sophomore and he posted 3.9 points per game. As a junior, Balanc averaged 14.6 points and 4.2 rebounds per game, earning Second Team All-MAAC honors. He averaged 12 points and 4.6 rebounds per game as a senior. As a fifth-year player, Balanc averaged 17.9 points and 4.7 rebounds per game. He was named MAAC Player of the Year.
