= Thomas Hardiman (handballer) =

American handball player

Tom Hardiman
Personal information
- Full name: Thomas Joseph Hardiman
- Born: August 2, 1947 (age 79) Trenton, New Jersey, United States
- Height: 188 cm (74 in)
- Weight: 85 kg (187 lb)
- Handball career
- Sport: Handball
- Position: Pivot
National team
- Years: Team
- 1970's: United States United States

Career information
- High school: Trenton Cathedral High School
- College: Canisius University (1967–68–1968–69)

Basketball career

Thomas Joseph Hardiman (born August 2, 1947) is an American former handball player who competed in the 1972 Summer Olympics.

== Private life ==
He was born and raised in Trenton, New Jersey. Later he became pastor of the MorningStar Fellowship of Ministries in Fort Mill, South Carolina.

== Handball ==
By March 1972 he had played five international games played for the United States. He was then selected for the American team which finished 14th in the handball tournament at the 1972 Summer Olympics in Munich. He only played the second game of the preliminary round against Yugoslavia. He scored no goal.

== Basketball ==
Hardiman played for the Trenton Cathedral High School. Where he averaged 17 points and 19 rebounds. He was selected in the New Jersey All-State team, All-Diocese first team and he was selected for the All-Tournament team in the Capitol City Tournament. He declined an offer from the Georgetown University and selected the Canisius University.

Legend
GP	Games played	GS	Games started	MPG	Minutes per game
FG%	Field goal percentage	3P%	3-point field goal percentage	FT%	Free throw percentage
RPG	Rebounds per game	APG	Assists per game	SPG	Steals per game
BPG	Blocks per game	PPG	Points per game	**Bold**	Career high
†	Won a National Championship	*	Led Division I

Thomas Hardiman NCAA statistics
Year	Team	GP	FG%	FT%	RPG	PPG
1967–68	Canisius	19	.345	.560	32	3.9
1968–69	Canisius	**23**	**.380**	**.667**	**67**	**5.1**
Career		42	.365	.625	99	4.6
