= Amarri Monroe =

American basketball player (born 2003)

No. 8 – Syracuse Orange
- Position: Power forward
- Conference: Atlantic Coast Conference

Personal information
- Born: March 4, 2003 (age 23)
- Listed height: 6 ft 7 in (2.01 m)
- Listed weight: 225 lb (102 kg)

Career information
- High school: Newburgh Free Academy (Newburgh, New York); South Kent School (South Kent, Connecticut)
- College: Wofford (2022–2023); Quinnipiac (2023–2026); Syracuse (2026–present)
- NBA draft: 2026: undrafted

Career highlights
- MAAC Player of the Year (2025); 2× First-team All-MAAC (2025, 2026); Second-team All-MAAC (2024); MAAC All-Defensive team (2026)

Amarri Monroe (born March 4, 2003) is an American college basketball player for the Syracuse Orange of the Atlantic Coast Conference (ACC). He previously played for the Wofford Terriers and Quinnipiac Bobcats.

== Early life and high school career ==
Monroe grew up in Newburgh, New York and attended Newburgh Free Academy. He received no scholarship offers until his senior year. Monroe opted to reclassify to the 2022 class and do a postgraduate season at South Kent School. He averaged 15 points, 8 rebounds and 3 assists per game, leading South Kent to a National Prep Championships appearance. Monroe committed to play college basketball at Wofford.

== College career ==
As a freshman, Monroe averaged 3.6 points and 3.9 rebounds per game. He transferred to Quinnipiac after the season. Monroe averaged 12.9 points and 6.9 rebounds per game as a sophomore. As a junior, he averaged 18.1 points, 9.1 rebounds, 2.3 steals, and 1.6 assists per game. Monroe had 14 double-doubles and led Quinnipiac to its second straight MAAC regular-season title. He was named MAAC Player of the Year. Following the season, Monroe entered the transfer portal but ultimately opted to return to Quinnipiac. He averaged 15.6 points and 8.3 rebounds per game as a senior. Following the season, Monroe transferred to Syracuse.
