= Eyal Yaffe =

Israeli basketball player (born 1960)

Eyal Yaffe אייל יפה
Personal information
- Born: January 15, 1960 (age 66)
- Listed height: 6 ft 3 in (1.91 m)

Career information
- College: Canisius (1984–1986)
- Position: Guard

Career highlights
- FIBA European Champions Cup champion (1977)

Eyal Yaffe (Hebrew: אייל יפה; born January 15, 1960) is an Israeli former basketball player. He played the guard position, and competed in the Israeli Basketball Premier League.

== Biography ==
Yaffe is from Tel Aviv, Israel, and is Jewish. His father is Moshe Yaffe of Ramat Efal, Israel. He is 6 ft 3 in (191 cm) tall. He served three years in the Israel Defense Forces. He graduated from Canisius College with a master of business administration degree.

In 1991 he married Sarina Gullo in Buffalo, New York. He became a financial consultant/broker, and has worked for Merrill Lynch Consumer Markets in Westlake Village, California, since 1990.

== Basketball career ==
He played for Israel in the 1977 FIBA European Championship for Cadets (Under-16).

Yaffe played for Maccabi Tel Aviv in the Israeli Basketball Premier League. The highlight was his playing for the Maccabi Tel Aviv team that won the 1976–77 FIBA European Champions Cup. In the semifinals, Maccabi Tel Aviv beat the Russian Red Army team 91 to 79. In 1982 Yaffe played amateur basketball in West Germany.

Yaffe attended Canisius College in Buffalo, New York. Because he had played basketball in Europe, and given his age (22 years old), he was required to forfeit one year of eligibility. The Canisius coaching staff therefore redshirted Yaffe in 1982–83, intending to have him begin his career the next fall. However, he missed the 1983–84 season with an injury. He then played basketball for the Canisius Golden Griffins in 1984–86. He was given the 1985 Canisius College Cage Club Unsung Hero Award.

== See also ==
- Sports in Israel
