= Jermaine Crumpton =

American basketball player (born 1994)

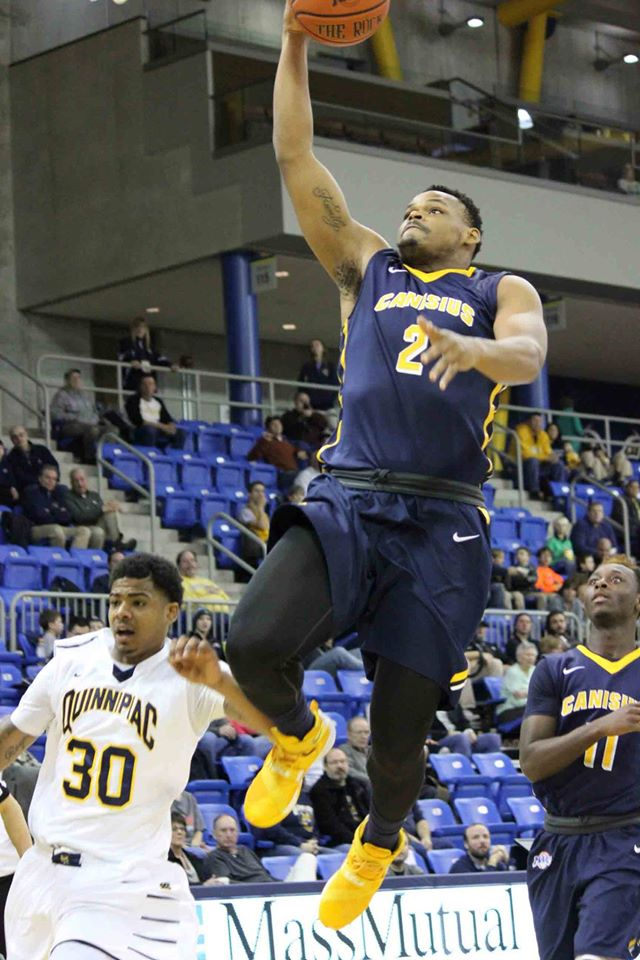

Free agent
- Position: Small forward

Personal information
- Born: April 8, 1994 (age 32) Niagara Falls, New York, U.S.
- Listed height: 6 ft 6 in (1.98 m)
- Listed weight: 230 lb (104 kg)

Career information
- High school: Niagara Falls (Niagara Falls, New York)
- College: Canisius (2014–2018)
- NBA draft: 2018: undrafted
- Playing career: 2018–present

Career history
- 2018: T71 Dudelange

Career highlights
- AP Honorable Mention All-American (2018); MAAC Co-Player of the Year (2018); First-team All-MAAC (2018)

Jermaine Crumpton (born April 8, 1994) is an American basketball player. He played college basketball for the Canisius College and was named the 2018 Metro Atlantic Athletic Conference Co-Player of the Year.

The Niagara Falls, New York native small forward played basketball at Niagara Falls High School and committed to Canisius in Buffalo as a junior. After sitting out the 2013–14 season as a redshirt, Crumpton was an immediate contributor, averaging 7.2 points in 17.6 minutes per game. As a junior, he averaged 15.9 points and 4.5 rebounds per game and was a third-team All-Metro Atlantic Athletic Conference (MAAC) selection.

In the off-season prior to his senior year, Crumpton underwent a weight training regimen and lost 30 pounds, resulting in an ability to be more active and improve endurance. The plan worked well, as at the close of the 2017–18 season, was named the MAAC co-Player of the Year with Niagara's Kahlil Dukes. The duo were also named honorable mention All-Americans by the Associated Press.

Crumpton signed his first professional deal with T71 Dudelange in Luxembourg’s Total League for the 2018–19 season.
