= Lamont Jones =

American basketball player (born 1990)

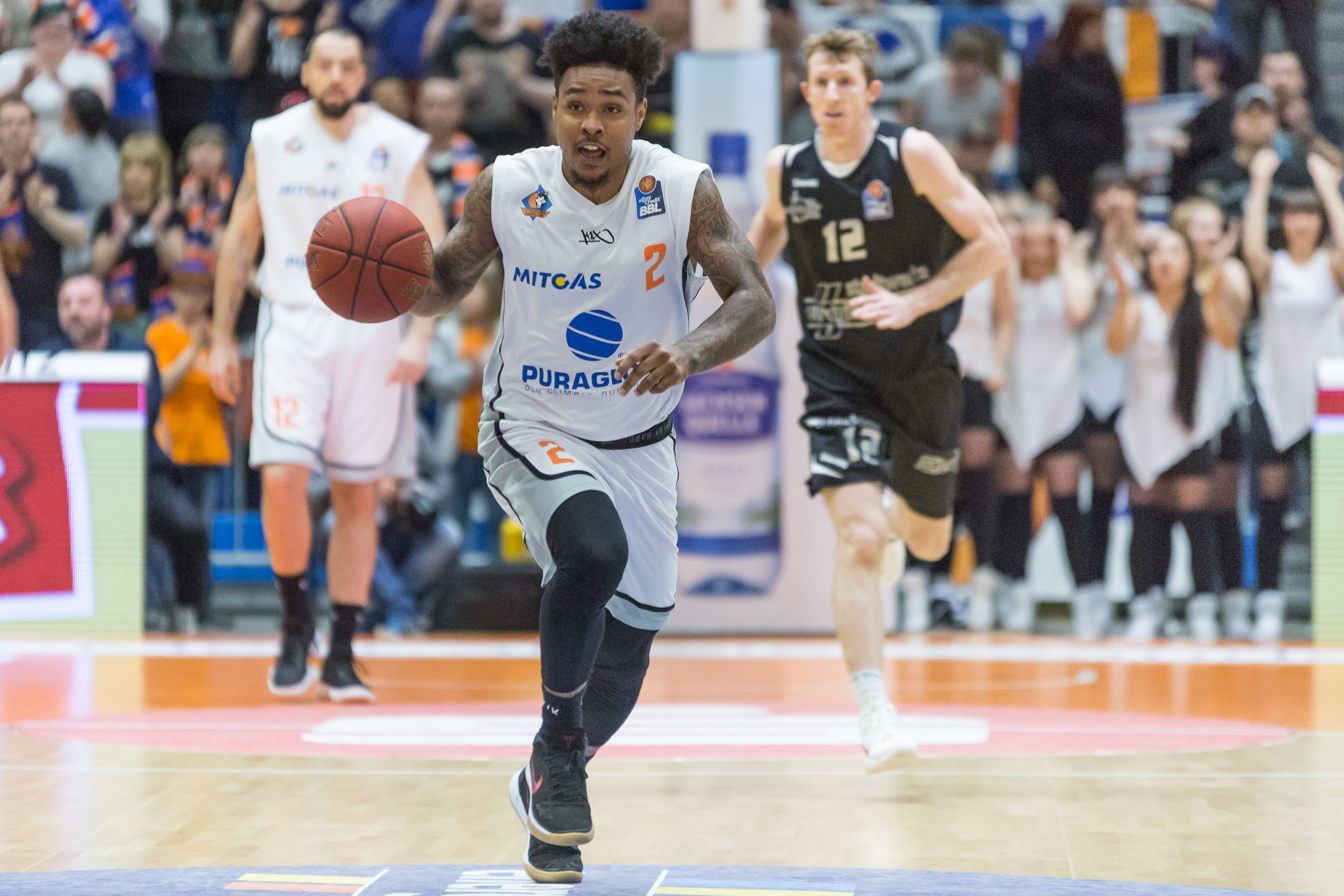

Al Qurain
- Position: Point guard / shooting guard
- League: Kuwaiti Division I Basketball League

Personal information
- Born: June 26, 1990 (age 36)
- Listed height: 6 ft 0 in (1.83 m)
- Listed weight: 196 lb (89 kg)

Career information
- High school: Rice (New York City, New York); American Christian (Aston, Pennsylvania); Oak Hill (Mouth of Wilson, Virginia)
- College: Arizona (2009–2011); Iona (2011–2013)
- NBA draft: 2013: undrafted
- Playing career: 2013–present

Career history
- 2013–2014: Kumamoto Volters
- 2014: Al Rayyan
- 2014–2015: Al-Ittihad Jeddah
- 2015: Al-Nasr
- 2015–2016: Korikobrat
- 2016–2017: Mornar Bar
- 2017–2018: Mitteldeutscher
- 2018–2019: MHP Riesen Ludwigsburg
- 2019–2020: Skyliners Frankfurt
- 2020–2022: Semt77 Yalovaspor
- 2022: Mitteldeutscher
- 2022–2023: Semt77 Yalovaspor
- 2023: Manama
- 2023–2024: Al-Shorta
- 2024–present: Al Qurain

Career highlights
- Finnish League scoring champion (2016); Finnish League Foreign MVP (2016); AP Honorable Mention All-American (2013); MAAC Player of the Year (2013); Haggerty Award (2013)

Lamont Da Sean "MoMo" Jones (born June 26, 1990) is an American professional basketball player for Al Qurain of the Kuwaiti Division I Basketball League. He was a standout college player for Iona College and was an honorable mention All-American and conference player of the year as a senior. He also played at the University of Arizona.

== Playing background ==
Jones, a 6'0 guard from Harlem, New York, led prep powerhouse Oak Hill Academy to a 41–1 record as a senior, averaging 21.3 points and 8 assists per game. He signed originally with the University of Southern California, but was released from his commitment when head coach Tim Floyd resigned. He landed at Arizona and played two seasons for the Wildcats. The highlight of his time in Tucson was scoring 16 points as Arizona upset top seeded defending champion Duke in the Sweet Sixteen of the 2011 NCAA Tournament.

Following the 2010–11 season, Jones decided to transfer from Arizona to Iona, a school closer to his home in New York City where his grandmother was ill. He was granted a waiver by the National Collegiate Athletic Association (NCAA) and allowed to play immediately. As a junior in 2011–12, Jones teamed with senior Scott Machado in the backcourt to lead the Gaels to the NCAA Tournament. Jones scored 15.7 points per game and was named second team All-Metro Atlantic Athletic Conference (MAAC).

As a senior, Jones was asked to take on more of the scoring load for the Gaels and responded by averaging 22.6 points per game, finishing third in scoring nationally. He led the Gaels back to the NCAA Tournament and at the end of the season was named the MAAC Player of the Year and an honorable mention All-American by the Associated Press.

== Professional career ==
Jones declared for the 2013 NBA draft, but he went undrafted. Jones then signed with the Kumamoto Volters in the Japanese National Basketball League.

On July 28, 2017, he signed for Mitteldeutscher. Jones inked with another Basketball Bundesliga team, MHP Riesen Ludwigsburg, on July 12, 2018.

On August 19, 2019, Jones signed with Skyliners Frankfurt of the Basketball Bundesliga.

On November 5, 2020, Jones signed with Semt77 Yalovaspor of Turkish Basketball League.

On July 22, 2022, he has signed with Mitteldeutscher of the German Basketball Bundesliga for a second stint.

On November 9, 2022, he signed with and returned to Semt77 Yalovaspor of the Turkish Basketball First League.

On August 24, 2024, Jones signed with Al Qurain of the Kuwaiti Division I Basketball League.
