= Mario Porter =

American basketball player

Personal information
- Born: October 27, 1980 (age 46) Newark, New Jersey, U.S.
- Listed height: 6 ft 6 in (1.98 m)
- Listed weight: 225 lb (102 kg)

Career information
- High school: Irvington (Irvington, New Jersey)
- College: Rider (1998–2002)
- NBA draft: 2002: undrafted
- Playing career: 2002–2015
- Position: Small forward

Career history
- 2002: Pennsylvania ValleyDawgs
- 2002: Entente Orléanaise Loiret
- 2003: Leicester Riders
- 2003: Carrefour Aveiro
- 2004–2005: Mulhouse
- 2005–2006: Rouen
- 2006–2007: San Pablo Burgos
- 2007–2008: Kauhajoki
- 2008–2009: Saint-Quentin
- 2014–2015: Mulhouse

Career highlights
- MAAC Player of the Year (2002); 2× First-team All-MAAC (2001, 2002); Second-team All-MAAC (2000)

Mario Porter (born October 27, 1980) is an American former professional basketball player. He played college basketball for the Rider Broncs and was the Metro Atlantic Athletic Conference (MAAC) Player of the Year in 2002. Porter played professionally in Europe.

== High school career ==
Porter was raised in North Jersey; his mother moved him from Newark to Irvington in the eighth grade so he could live in a safer environment. He played basketball at Irvington High School where he averaged 22.1 points and 13 rebounds during his senior season. Porter did not have a desire to play at a high-profile school and committed to play for the Rider Broncs under head coach Don Harnum.

== College career ==
Porter averaged 5.5 points and 2.9 rebounds during his freshman season with the Broncs. He blossomed during his sophomore season to average 17.6 points and 6.6 rebounds per game. Porter averaged 19.2 points and 6.8 rebounds during his junior season which prompted MAAC coaches to tab him as the preseason Player of the Year for his senior season. Harnum challenged Porter to live up to the expectation because "he's just that unassuming and nondescript." Porter averaged a league-leading 20.3 points and 8.4 rebounds during the 2001–02 season to earn the MAAC Player of the Year award.

Porter was inducted into the Rider Athletics Hall of Fame in 2008.

== Professional career ==
After his graduation from Rider, Porter was selected by the Pennsylvania ValleyDawgs as the 16th overall pick in the 2002 United States Basketball League (USBL) draft. He played briefly for the ValleyDawgs, averaging 6.5 points and 3.3 rebounds in 13 games played. Porter then joined Entente Orléanaise Loiret. On January 9, 2003, Porter signed with the Leicester Riders of the British Basketball League (BBL).

Porter has played in Angola, Finland and Spain but has spent the majority of his professional career in France.

== Personal life ==
Porter has two children with his French wife, Cindy.
