= Kevair Kennedy =

American basketball player

No. 55 – Wake Forest Demon Deacons
- Position: Point guard
- Conference: Atlantic Coast Conference

Personal information
- Listed height: 6 ft 2 in (1.88 m)
- Listed weight: 175 lb (79 kg)

Career information
- High school: Father Judge (Philadelphia, Pennsylvania)
- College: Merrimack (2025–2026); Wake Forest (2026–present)

Career highlights
- MAAC Player of the Year (2026); First-team All-MAAC (2026); MAAC Rookie of the Year (2026)

Kevair Kennedy is an American college basketball player for the Wake Forest Demon Deacons of the Atlantic Coast Conference (ACC). He previously played for the Merrimack Warriors.

== Early life and high school ==
Kennedy attended Father Judge High School in Philadelphia, Pennsylvania. He averaged 17.3 points, 6.5 rebounds, 6.0 assists and 2.0 steals per game as a junior, helping the team reach the Catholic League semifinals. As a senior, he helped lead the team to their first ever state title, scoring 27 points in the championship game. Kennedy finished his senior season averaging 16.1 points, 7.3 assists, 6.6 rebounds, and 2.0 steals per game, being named the MaxPreps Pennsylvania Player of the Year. Following his high school career, he committed to play college basketball at Merrimack College, the first school to offer him a scholarship.

== College career ==
As a true freshman, Kennedy made an instant impact, emerging as the team's leading scorer and assister. At the conclusion of the regular season, he was named both the MAAC Rookie of the Year as well as the MAAC Player of the Year, becoming the first freshman to win it in the award's 44-year history. Kennedy averaged 18.4 points, 4.6 rebounds, 4.2 assists, and 1.9 steals per game. Following the season he transferred to Wake Forest.
