= Cameron Young (basketball) =

American basketball player (born 1996)

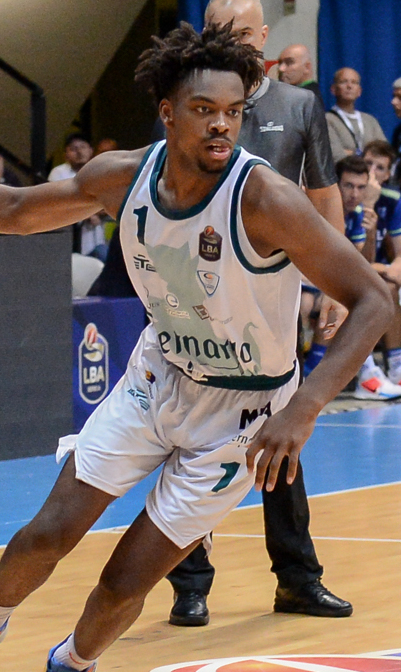
- Young with Cantù in 2019

No. 1 – Xinjiang Flying Tigers
- Position: Shooting guard
- League: CBA

Personal information
- Born: March 24, 1996 (age 30) Inglewood, California, U.S.
- Listed height: 6 ft 6 in (1.98 m)
- Listed weight: 205 lb (93 kg)

Career information
- High school: Westchester (Los Angeles, California)
- College: Arizona Western (2014–2016); Quinnipiac (2016–2019)
- NBA draft: 2019: undrafted
- Playing career: 2019–present

Career history
- 2019–2020: Cantù
- 2021: Cherkaski Mavpy
- 2021–2022: Memphis Hustle
- 2022: Cleveland Charge
- 2022–2023: NBA G League Ignite
- 2023–2024: Runa Basket Moscow
- 2024: Hapoel Haifa
- 2025: Central Club
- 2025–2026: Karşıyaka Basket
- 2026–present: Xinjiang Flying Tigers

Career highlights
- MAAC Player of the Year (2019); First-team All-MAAC (2019); Second-team All-MAAC (2018)

Cameron Jordan Young (born March 24, 1996) is an American professional basketball player for Xinjiang Flying Tigers of the Chinese Basketball Association (CBA). He played college basketball for the Quinnipiac Bobcats after playing two years at Arizona Western College. Young led the conference in points per game and was named the Metro Atlantic Athletic Conference Player of the Year for the 2018–19 season.

== High school ==
He played his high school career at Westchester High School in Los Angeles. There, he was a first-team all-conference selection.

== College career ==
Young then moved to junior college Arizona Western College, where he was named first-team Arizona Community College Athletic Conference as a sophomore. He averaged 17.2 points (5th in the conference), 6.0 rebounds, and 1.8 assists per game.

Young signed with Quinnipiac as his four-year college. Young's first season at Quinnipiac, as a junior in 2016-17, consisted of only six minutes as he found himself on coach Tom Moore’s bench. He would later be granted another year of eligibility by the National Collegiate Athletic Association (NCAA).

Young's next season was saved as new head coach Baker Dunleavy inserted Young into the starting lineup as a senior in 2017-18. Young responded, averaging 18.8 points (4th in the Men's Metro Atlantic Athletic Conference (MAAC)), 6.8 rebounds (5th), and 1.3 steals per game, shooting .422 from the field (8th) and .754 from the free throw line (7th), for the Bobcats and earning second-team All-MAAC honors.

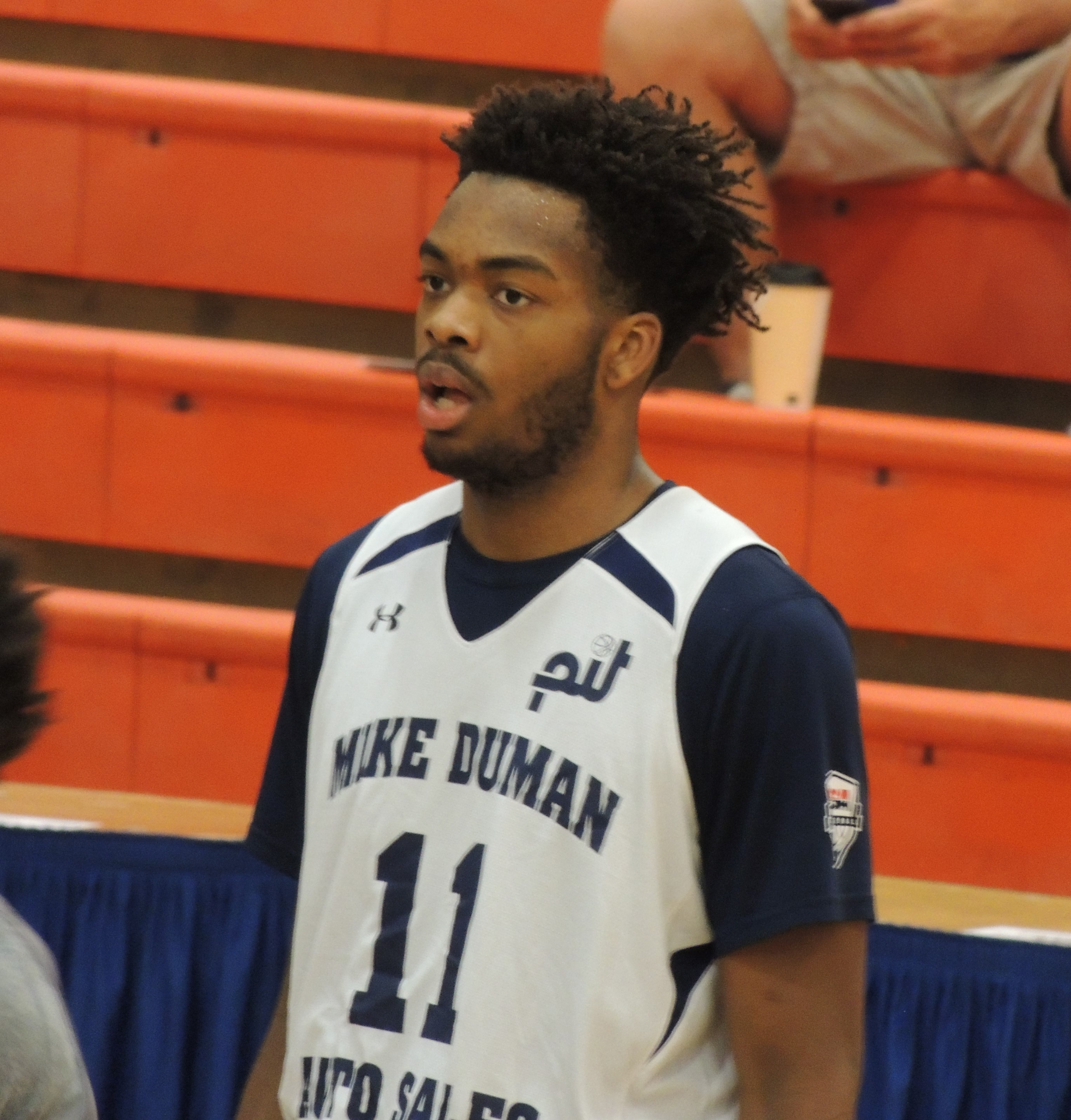
Young at the Portsmouth Invitational Tournament in April 2019

Following his fifth year of eligibility being reinstated, Young entered the 2018–19 season as a graduate student and as the leading returning scorer in the MAAC and a preseason first-team All-MAAC selection. In a February 18, 2019, game, Young scored 55 points against Siena. The total marked a MAAC and Quinnipiac Division I record and was the most points scored in an NCAA Division I game since North Dakota State’s Ben Woodside scored 60 in 2008. Young led the Bobcats to an 11–7 MAAC record, with 23.5 points (1st in the MAAC), 5.1 rebounds, and 1.1 steals per game as well as a .482 field goal percentage (4th), .766 free throw percentage (3rd), and .437 three-point percentage (1st), and at the close of the season was named the MAAC Player of the Year and a first-team All-MAAC pick.

== Professional career ==
=== Cantù (2019–2020) ===
After going undrafted in the 2019 NBA draft, Young signed his first professional contract with Italian club Pallacanestro Cantù of the Lega Basket Serie A. He averaged 9.4 points per game.

=== Cherkaski Mavpy (2021) ===
On February 25, 2021, Young signed with Cherkaski Mavpy in the Ukrainian Basketball SuperLeague. He scored a season-high 23 points in a 79–88 loss to BC Ternopil. He averaged 13.3 points per game.

=== South Bay Lakers (2021) ===
On October 23, 2021, Young signed with the South Bay Lakers of the NBA G League after a successful tryout. However, he was waived at the end of training camp.

=== Memphis Hustle (2021–2022) ===
On December 5, 2021, Young was signed by the Memphis Hustle. He averaged 17.3 points, 4.2 rebounds and 1.7 assists per game.

=== Cleveland Charge (2022) ===
On February 24, 2022, Young was traded from the Memphis Hustle to the Cleveland Charge in exchange for Dwayne Sutton and the rights to Levi Randolph. He averaged 25.5 points, 4.1 rebounds, and 0.9 steals per game, shooting 50.4% from the field and 88.1% from the free throw line.

=== NBA G League Ignite (2022–2023) ===
On September 28, 2022, Young signed with the NBA G League Ignite. He averaged 10.8 points per game, shooting 86.0% from the free throw line.

=== Runa Basket Moscow (2023–2024) ===
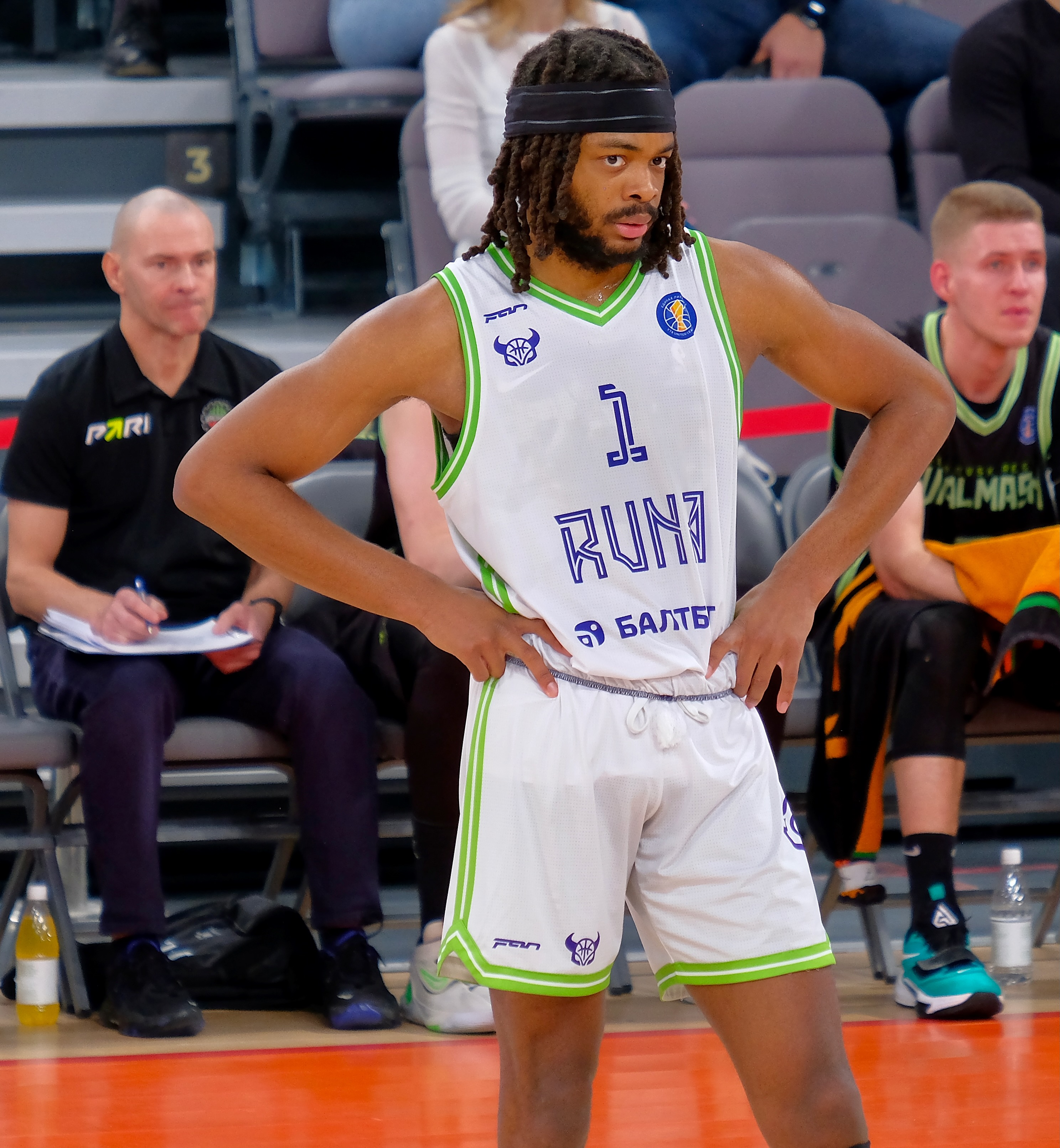
Young in April 2024

On August 23, 2023, Young signed with Runa Basket Moscow of the VTB United League. He averaged 11.0 points per game.

=== Hapoel Haifa (2024) ===
He signed with Hapoel Haifa in the Israeli Basketball Premier League on October 7, 2024.

=== Karşıyaka Basket (2025–2026) ===
On August 13, 2025, he signed with Karşıyaka Basket of the Basketbol Süper Ligi (BSL).

== Career statistics ==
=== Professional ===
Legend
| GP | Games played | MPG | Minutes per game | FG% | Field goal percentage |
| 3P% | 3-point field goal percentage | FT% | Free throw percentage | RPG | Rebounds per game |
| APG | Assists per game | SPG | Steals per game | BPG | Blocks per game |
| PPG | Points per game | **Bold** | Career high | | Led the league |

| Year | Team | League | GP | MPG | FG% | 3P% | FT% | RPG | APG | SPG | BPG | PPG |
|---|---|---|---|---|---|---|---|---|---|---|---|---|
| 2019–20 | Pallacanestro Cantù | Lega Basket Serie A2 | 20 | 22.2 | .364 | .283 | .725 | 2.6 | 1.2 | .6 | .2 | 9.5 |
| 2020–21 | Cherkaski Mavpy | Ukrainian SuperLeague | 21 | 25.3 | .457 | .369 | .782 | 2.3 | 1.2 | .9 | .7 | 13.8 |
| Career | | All Leagues | 41 | 23.8 | .417 | .318 | .760 | 2.5 | 1.2 | .7 | .5 | 11.7 |
