= Ray Hall (basketball) =

American basketball player and coach

Personal information
- Born: June 23, 1962 (age 64) Buffalo, New York, U.S.
- Listed height: 6 ft 4 in (1.93 m)
- Listed weight: 195 lb (88 kg)

Career information
- High school: McKinley (Buffalo, New York)
- College: Canisius (1981–1985)
- NBA draft: 1985: 5th round, 105th overall pick
- Drafted by: Utah Jazz
- Position: Shooting guard / small forward
- Number: 30

Career history

Playing
- 1985–1987: Wyoming Wildcatters
- 1988: Charleston Gunners
- 1988: Quad City Thunder
- 1988: Youngstown Pride
- 1988: Purefoods Hotdogs
- 1988–1989: Quad City Thunder
- 1989–1990: Columbus Horizon
- 1990: Cedar Rapids Silver Bullets
- 1990: Erie Wave

Coaching
- 1992–1993: Niagara CCC

Career highlights
- CBA All-Star (1988); World Challenge Cup MVP (1987); IBL All-Star (1987); AP honorable mention All-American (1985); 2× First-team All-ECAC North (1984, 1985); ECAC North Rookie of the Year (1982)
- Stats at Basketball Reference

Lawrence "Ray" Hall (sometimes known as Sugar Ray Hall; born June 23, 1962) is an American former college basketball player. He is currently the all-time leader in scoring, free throws made, field goals made and steals for the Canisius Golden Griffins men's basketball. He formerly held various records, including career points, for the ECAC-North Conference (now America East Conference). He led Canisius in scoring and steals all four years. In high school, he was the 1981 co-Western New York player of the year and held the Buffalo Public Schools and Western New York career scoring record. Hall is the most recent NBA draft selection from Canisius. Following his college career, he played professionally, including several years in the Continental Basketball Association (CBA) and World Basketball League (WBL).

== High school ==
Ray Hall is described as being from a good family in Buffalo's inner city, who acquired the nickname Sugar Ray as a teenager. In 1974, Jo Jo White made two free throws for the Boston Celtics after the clock expired in the game that eliminated the Buffalo Braves from the 1974 NBA playoffs. Hall attempted to pelt White with an apple, but White ducked. White would become Hall's sports agent in 1985. In 1981, Hall established the Buffalo Public Schools career scoring record of 1,794, which was eclipsed by Curtis Aiken on February 8, 1983. Hall's 1981 total was also a Western New York record. That year he was named Western New York boys' basketball co-player of the year (with Lester Rowe) by The Buffalo News. On February 21, 1981, Hall committed to Canisius over Vanderbilt, Michigan, Pittsburgh and Rutgers.

In the 1981 Empire State Games open division finals, Hall had a game-high 26 points in the 98–97 gold medal game loss to a New York City team that included Chris Mullin, Tony Bruin, and Sidney Green.

In 2009 as The Buffalo News celebrated 50 years of All-Western New York (WNY) basketball selections, Hall, who was twice an All-WNY first team selection, was a fourth team selection for the All-time All-WNY team.

== College ==
Hall is the all-time Canisius leader in career points (2,226), field goals made (812), free throws made (602), and steals (219). He also holds the school's freshman season records for points (455) and steals (53). Hall held other Canisius records including single-season steals (65), career games started (115) and single-season minutes per game (36.7, 37.0). He led the team in scoring and steals for all four years. Hall led the team in rebounding as a sophomore. He was selected to the All-ECAC-North Conference (now America East Conference) first team as a junior (1984) and senior (1985) and was the conference Rookie of the Year in 1982. Hall is the most recent Canisius NBA draftee having been selected with the 12 pick of the 5th round by the Utah Jazz a few hours after 4-year teammate Mike Smrek (2nd round, 1st pick) in the 1985 NBA draft. He served as co-captain with Smrek as a senior. Although he no longer holds America East Conference scoring records, Hall formerly held scoring records such as career points — but was surpassed Al McClain's 1980–84 1861 total and Reggie Lewis's 1983–87 2709 total — and free throws made. He was a five-time conference Player of the Week. As a senior, hall led Canisius to its only regular season ECAC-North Conference championship (that it shared with Northeastern). He played both small forward and shooting guard with significant coverage of him going back and forth. Hall was a 1985 NCAA Men's Basketball All-American honorable mention selection by the Associated Press.

Hall played in the 1982 National Sports Festival (later called the U.S. Olympic Festival) for the East team with Andre Williams, Ed Pinckney, Harold Pressley and Rafael Addison. He scored 13 points, including the go-ahead basket, in the July 27 game against the North.

== Professional ==
At the Jazz 1985 training camp, Hall was waived in the cut that reduced the roster from 17 to 14. He played for the Wyoming Wildcatters of the CBA for the 1985–86 season, where he was a roommate with 2-time NBA All-Star John Drew after Drew was forced out of the NBA for drug abuse. In August 1986, he was invited back to the October 1986 training camp, and he signed with the team that month. He worked out a lot with Darrell Griffith who had missed the prior season nursing a foot fracture. He only posted a 32 percent field goal percentage in 6 1986 pre-season games, and he was released from the team later that month.

In September 1987, Hall was announced as part of a 13-member all-star team of the International Basketball League that did an exhibition tour (including the 1987 PBA/IBA World Challenge Cup) of the Far East from September 12 to 27, that visited Seoul, South Korea and Manila, Philippines. Hall wound up being MVP of the World Challenge Cup. He was a 1988 CBA All-Star, having played as a member of the Charleston Gunners that year. On April 15, he signed with the Youngstown Pride of the World Basketball League (WBL), where he was teammates with his former Co-Player of the Year Rowe. He was among 22 players invited to a May 23–26, 1988, tryout camp for the inaugural Charlotte Hornets roster. That summer he played for Youngstown. Although Hall was invited back, the June 23, 1988 NBA expansion draft, in which the Hornets loaded up on guards, and the related Kelly Tripucka trade, made it less likely that Hall would make the roster. In early August 1988, the Hornets training camp started with 30 players, which was cut to 21 three days later. Hall performed well. Later that August, he played for the Hornets in the 6-game rookie summer league, scoring 17 points in the summer league opener and 27 points in the summer league finale. However, by mid-November he was playing abroad in the 1988 PBA Reinforced Conference and expected to return to the Quad City Thunder of the CBA in December, which he did. In November 1989, he tried out with the Columbus Horizon of the CBA. In February 1990, Hall signed with the Cedar Rapids Silver Bullets of the CBA. In May 1990, he signed with the Erie Wave of the WBL.

In November 1992, Hall joined the staff at Niagara County Community College as an assistant coach. Hall resigned in September 1993, but not before participating in his first Gus Macker 3-on-3 Basketball Tournament in Buffalo where he reached the final game that June. In October 1993, he tried out with the Hartford Hellcats of the CBA.

Hall was a selection along with Rickey Williams and Keith Robinson, the inaugural Mr. New York Basketball (1986), among others to the 2009 50th anniversary All-Western New York boys fourth team by The Buffalo News for his high school career. In 1997, he was inducted into the Canisius Sports Hall of Fame. In 2008, he was inducted into the Greater Buffalo Sports Hall of Fame.

As of 2011, he had spent over 17 years working for Ingram Micro in Amherst, New York, and had become an avid bowler.

== See also ==
- Canisius Golden Griffins men's basketball statistical leaders
- List of NCAA Division I men's basketball career scoring leaders
- Utah Jazz draft history
