= Herm Hedderick =

American basketball player

Personal information
- Born: January 10, 1930 Erie, Pennsylvania
- Died: August 20, 2014 (aged 84) Latrobe, Pennsylvania
- Listed height: 6 ft 5 in (1.96 m)
- Listed weight: 170 lb (77 kg)

Career information
- High school: Mill Creek (Erie, Pennsylvania)
- College: Canisius (1949–1952)
- NBA draft: 1952: 4th round, 37th overall pick
- Drafted by: Boston Celtics
- Position: Shooting guard
- Number: 14

Career history
- 1955: New York Knicks
- Stats at NBA.com
- Stats at Basketball Reference

Herman Arthur Hedderick (January 10, 1930 – August 20, 2014) was an American professional basketball player. Hedderick was selected in the 1952 NBA draft by the Boston Celtics after a collegiate career at Canisius. He played for the New York Knicks in only five games during the second half of the 1954–55 season. His career totals include four points, four rebounds and two assists.

== Career statistics ==
Legend
GP	Games played	GS	Games started	MPG	Minutes per game
FG%	Field goal percentage	3P%	3-point field goal percentage	FT%	Free throw percentage
RPG	Rebounds per game	APG	Assists per game	SPG	Steals per game
BPG	Blocks per game	PPG	Points per game	**Bold**	Career high

=== NBA ===
==== Regular season ====
Year	Team	GP	MPG	FG%	FT%	RPG	APG	PPG
1954–55	New York	5	4.6	.222	.000	.8	.4	.8
