= Greg Logins Jr =

American basketball player

BBC Bascharage Hedgehogs
- Position: Forward
- League: Luxembourg

Personal information
- Born: March 16, 1988 (age 38) Sodus, New York
- Listed height: 6 ft 8 in (2.03 m)
- Listed weight: 205 lb (93 kg)

Career information
- High school: Sodus High School (Sodus, New York); Kent School (post graduate)
- College: Canisius College (Buffalo, New York) (2007–2011)
- Playing career: 2011–present

Career history
- 2011–2012: Mexico Barreteros de Zacatecas
- 2012: Morocco RST Tangier
- 2012–2014: Finland Lappeenrannan NMKY
- 2014–2015: Japan Rizing Zephyr Fukuoka
- 2015: Finland Espoon Honka
- 2015–2016: Germany BV Chemnitz 99
- 2016–2017: Israel Ramat Hasharon
- 2017: Argentina Club Ciclista Olímpico
- 2017–2018: Germany Hamburg Towers
- 2018: Denmark Team FOG Næstved
- 2019-2020: Germany Bayer Giants Leverkusen
- 2020-2022: Luxembourg BBC Bascharage Hedgehogs

Gregory Mark Logins Jr (born March 16, 1988) is an American professional basketball player. He was born in Sodus, New York to Greg Logins Sr and Shirley Jackson. He has four siblings, Denzell, Shamar, Alexis and Kiera. At Canisius College (Buffalo, New York) he obtained an Undergraduate degree in Physical Education and Health as well as a master's degree in Sports Administration in 2011. He is in his fourteenth overall season as a professional basketball player.

== Early career ==
Logins' success started in high school with the Sodus Spartans, which he helped lead to a league title as well as a New York State Championship Title in 2005, in which they held a record of 27-0. He was named to the first team New York State as a junior and was named State Champion Most Valuable Player. In his senior year, he helped the team win another season title. Logins was named player of the week 15 times as well as Most Valuable Player of the year. Furthermore, he made the Mc Donald's All Star Game Rochester and was named to the all first team Greater Rochester. Until this day, Logins holds the record for most rebounds during an All Star game (25).

During his post-graduate year at Kent School in Connecticut, he was named captain of the team and Most Valuable Player of the season. Furthermore, he made the top 50 players of the state of Connecticut.

== College ==
Logins Jr played College basketball for the Canisius Golden Griffins of the Canisius College in Buffalo, New York from 2007 until 2011. As a three-time team captain, he finished his career as one of five players in school history to score more than 1,200 career points and grab 750-plus career rebounds. Logins Jr ranks 15th in school history with 1,269 career points and fifth in career rebounds with 758 in 123 career games.

Further mentionable honors and achievements are:

- Freshman All-Mid-Major 1st Team of the country
- Three time Freshman Player of the Week
- 3rd Team all MAAC honors
- All MAAC 1st Team Academic Honors
- All Jesuit Academic Honors
- I-AAA ADA scholar-athlete
- 1,000 point club
- Over 700 rebound club
- Top 5 in rebounds grabbed in school history
- Player of the week eight times throughout his Division 1 career
- Canisius College Dean's list

== Professional career ==
After starting off his rookie season in Mexico in 2011, where he became the top scorer, and best rebounder of the league, basketball took Logins Jr all around the globe. As of today, he played professional basketball in Morocco, Finland, Japan, Germany, Israel, Argentina, and Denmark. He had appearances in the playoffs four times, and made the 2nd team All Germany (2nd league), and was honored Player of the week multiple times.
