= Trenton Cathedral High School =

Defunct Catholic high school in New Jersey

Coordinates: 40°13′23″N 74°45′58″W

Information
- Religious affiliation: Catholicism
- Established: 1908
- Closed: 1972
- Affiliation: Roman Catholic Diocese of Trenton

Trenton Cathedral High School was a Roman Catholic high school in Trenton, in Mercer County, New Jersey, United States. The school was operated by the Roman Catholic Diocese of Trenton from 1908 until it was closed after the 1971–72 school year due to excessive costs of a required repair project.

== Athletics ==
The boys basketball team won the Non-Public A state championship in 1963 (defeating Roselle Catholic High School in the tournament final) and 1967 (vs. Seton Hall Preparatory School). The 1963 team won the Parochial A state title with a 72–68 win against a Roselle Catholic team in its second year competing in interscholastic basketball at the varsity level. The 1967 team finished the season with a record of 22-3 after using aggressive offense and defense to win the Parochial A title by a score of 89–76 against Seton Hall Prep in the championship game.
