= Larry Fogle =

American basketball player

Personal information
- Born: March 19, 1953 (age 73) Brooklyn, New York, U.S.
- Listed height: 6 ft 5 in (1.96 m)
- Listed weight: 205 lb (93 kg)

Career information
- High school: Cooley (Detroit, Michigan)
- College: Louisiana (1971–1972); Canisius (1973–1975)
- NBA draft: 1975: 2nd round, 34th overall pick
- Drafted by: New York Knicks
- Playing career: 1975–1983
- Position: Guard
- Number: 44

Career history
- 1975: New York Knicks
- 1975–1977: Allentown Jets
- 1976–1977: Hazleton / Jersey Shore Bullets
- 1977–1978: Long Island Ducks
- 1978–1983: Rochester Zeniths

Career highlights
- 2× CBA champion (1979, 1981); CBA Playoff/Finals MVP (1979); All-CBA First Team (1981); Consensus second-team All-American (1974); NCAA scoring champion (1974); Second-team Parade All-American (1972)
- Stats at NBA.com
- Stats at Basketball Reference

Larry Fogle (born March 19, 1953) is a retired American basketball player. He was an American Basketball Association (ABA) and National Basketball Association (NBA) draft pick. He played in two games for the New York Knicks during 1975–1976 before playing for the CBA and starring on the Rochester Zeniths 1977–78 championship team.

== Background ==
Fogle, born in Brooklyn, New York, played basketball at Cooley High School in Detroit, Michigan. In February 1972, Fogle established a city league single-game scoring record of 73 points (versus Cody High); at season's end, Larry Fogle was named Michigan High School Player of the Year by the Detroit News. Upon graduating from Cooley, Fogle played collegiate basketball for the University of Southwestern Louisiana (now the University of Louisiana at Lafayette) and Canisius College.

A 6-foot-5-inch (1.96 m) and 205 pounds (93 kg) guard, Fogle was selected as an underclassman in the 1974 ABA draft in the eighth round by the Denver Nuggets after leading the NCAA in individual scoring, averaging 33.4 points per game and 14 rebounds per game in the 1973–74 season. That year Fogle was named an All-American by the United States Basketball Writers Association and the National Association of Basketball Coaches named him a third team All-American. Fogle opted to stay in college and the following year he was drafted in the second round of the 1975 NBA draft by the New York Knicks and in the fifth round of the 1975 ABA Draft by the Spirits of St. Louis.

Fogle played for the Knicks in the 1975-76 NBA season, appearing in two games and scoring two points to go with three rebounds.

Fogle played in the Eastern Basketball Association (EBA) / Continental Basketball Association (CBA) for the Allentown Jets, Hazleton / Jersey Shore Bullets, Long Island Ducks and Rochester Zeniths from 1975 to 1983. He won CBA championships with the Zeniths in 1979 and 1981. He was selected as the CBA Playoff/Finals MVP in 1979 and named to the All-CBA First Team in 1981.

== Career statistics ==
Legend
GP	Games played	GS	Games started	MPG	Minutes per game
FG%	Field goal percentage	3P%	3-point field goal percentage	FT%	Free throw percentage
RPG	Rebounds per game	APG	Assists per game	SPG	Steals per game
BPG	Blocks per game	PPG	Points per game	**Bold**	Career high

=== NBA ===
==== Regular season ====
Year	Team	GP	GS	MPG	FG%	FT%	RPG	APG	SPG	BPG	PPG
1975–76	New York	2	0	7.0	.200	–	1.5	.0	.5	.0	1.0
