= Malik Johnson (basketball) =

American professional basketball player (born 1997)

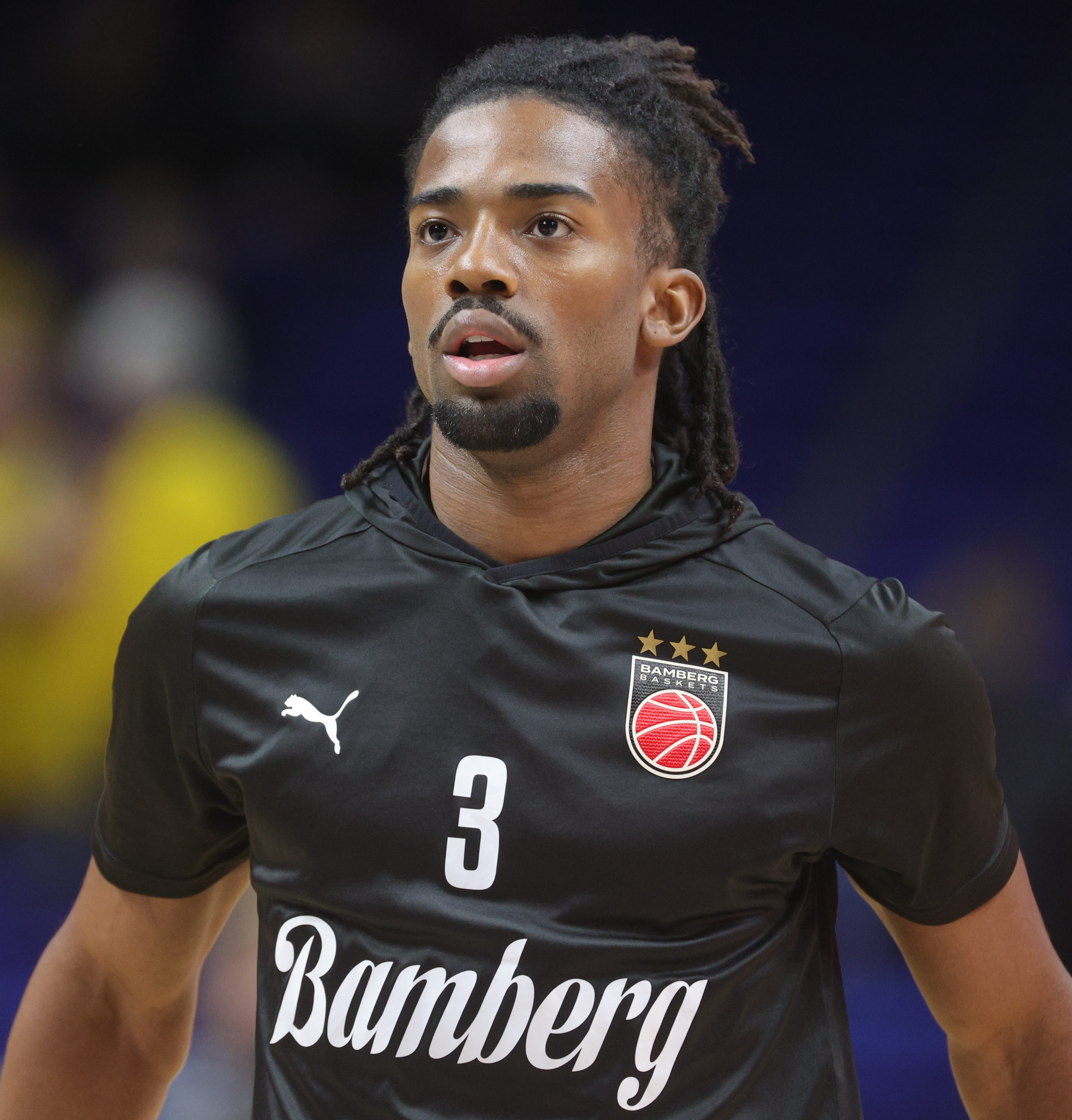

Free agent
- Position: Point guard

Personal information
- Born: January 25, 1997 (age 29) Richmond, Virginia, U.S.
- Listed height: 5 ft 10 in (1.78 m)
- Listed weight: 165 lb (75 kg)

Career information
- High school: Blue Ridge (Greer, South Carolina)
- College: Canisius (2016–2020)
- NBA draft: 2020: undrafted
- Playing career: 2020–present

Career history
- 2021–2023: Vevey Riviera
- 2023–2024: Brose Bamberg
- 2024–2025: Trepça
- 2025: Spójnia Stargard
- 2025–2026: Juventus Utena

Career highlights
- Kosovo Cup winner (2025); Kosovo Supercup winner (2024)

Malik Johnson (born January 25, 1997) is an American professional basketball player who recently played for Juventus Utena of the Lithuanian Basketball League (LKL). He played college basketball for the Canisius Golden Griffins before playing professionally.

== College career ==
Malik Johnson played four years of college basketball at Canisius University.

== Professional career ==
=== Vevey Riviera Basket (2021–2023) ===
On September 19, 2021, Johnson signed for Vevey Riviera of the Swiss Basketball League.

=== Brose Bamberg (2023–2024) ===
On June 28, 2023, Johnson signed for Brose Bamberg of the Basketball Bundesliga. In the 2023–24 BBL season, he averaged 7.9 points and 4.9 assists per game.

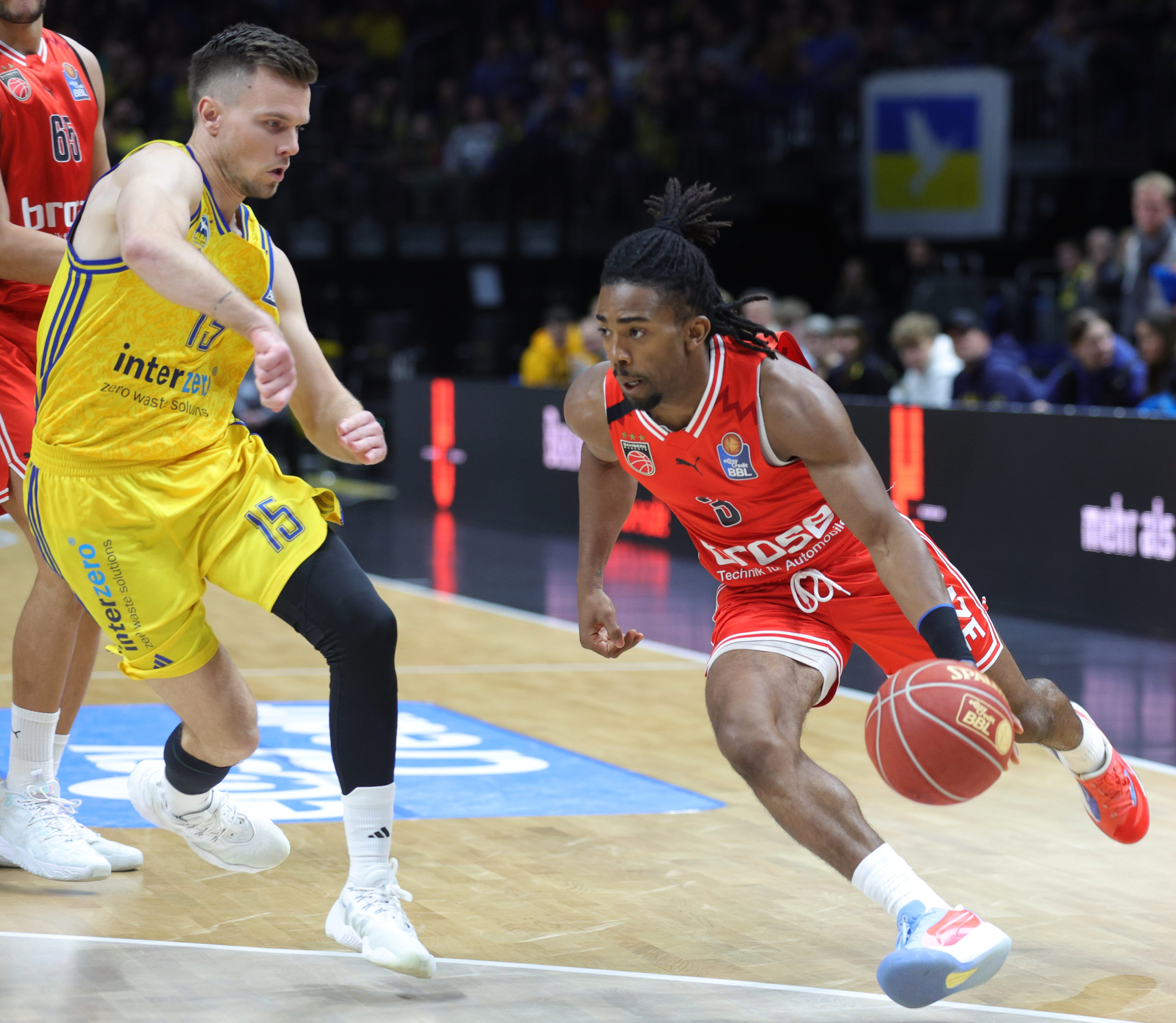
Malik Johnson against Alba Berlin

=== Trepça (2024–2025) ===
On July 31, 2024, Johnson signed for Trepça of the Kosovo Superleague, Liga Unike and Champions League. In the 2024–25 Superleague season, he averaged 10.9 points and 7.4 assists per game.

=== Spójnia Stargard (2025) ===
On February 16, 2025, he signed with Spójnia Stargard of the Polish Basketball League (PLK).

=== Juventus Utena (2025–2026) ===
On August 29, 2025, Johnson signed with Juventus Utena of the Lithuanian Basketball League (LKL).

== Personal life ==
Johnson is the nephew of former NBA player Ben Wallace.
