= Craig Wise (basketball) =

American basketball player

Personal information
- Born: c. 1974 (age 51–52)
- Listed height: 6 ft 5 in (1.96 m)

Career information
- High school: Central (Philadelphia, Pennsylvania)
- College: Canisius (1991–1995)
- NBA draft: 1995: undrafted
- Position: Forward

Career highlights
- MAAC Player of the Year (1995); 2× First-team All-MAAC (1994, 1995); MAAC Rookie of the Year (1992)

Craig Wise (born c. 1974) is an American former basketball player. He played college basketball for the Canisius Golden Griffins and was the Metro Atlantic Athletic Conference (MAAC) Player of the Year in 1995.

== College career ==
Wise was raised in a crime-ridden neighborhood in West Philadelphia, Pennsylvania, and played basketball at Central High School. He played his freshman season with the Canisius Golden Griffins as a 17-year-old. Alexander was selected as the MAAC Rookie of the Year, but was dispirited as he felt that many of his teammates lacked his commitment to winning. Wise contemplated leaving the team but decided to stay when John Beilein was appointed as head coach and established a new attitude amongst the players. Wise earned first-team All-MAAC honors during the 1993–94 season and helped lead the Griffins to their only MAAC regular season title. He averaged 16.4 points, 7.3 rebounds and 3.6 assists during his senior season in 1994–95 and was selected as the MAAC Player of the Year.

Wise ranks in the top-10 in 12 different career statistical categories amongst Golden Griffins players including third in scoring (1,799 points), fifth in rebounds (784), eighth in assists (353) and second in steals (218). He is the only player in school history with more than 1,500 points, 700 rebounds and 350 assists. Wise was inducted into the Canisius Sports Hall of Fame in 2005 and was included on the MAAC Honor Roll in 2017.

== Post-playing career ==
Wise graduated in 1995 as a 20-year-old with a degree in physical education and held aspirations of teaching and coaching. He was working as a transit cop in Philadelphia as of 2004.
