= Perry Bromwell =

American former professional basketball player

Personal information
- Born: c. 1964
- Listed height: 6 ft 2 in (1.88 m)
- Listed weight: 175 lb (79 kg)

Career information
- High school: Don Bosco Technical (Boston, Massachusetts); Avon Old Farms (Avon, Connecticut)
- College: Manhattam (1982–1983); Penn (1984–1987)
- NBA draft: 1987: 6th round, 118th overall pick
- Drafted by: New Jersey Nets
- Playing career: 1987?–1998
- Position: Point guard
- Coaching career: 1993–2009

Career history

Playing
- 1993–1994: Nottingham Cobras
- 1996–1997: Våg
- 1997–1998: Kristiansand Pirates

Coaching
- 1993–1994: Nottingham Cobras
- 1994–1996: Nottingham
- 1998–1999: Ursinus (assistant)
- 1999–2000: Frostburg State (assistant)
- 2000–2006: Florida high school(s)
- 2006–2009: Penn (assistant)

Career highlights
- As player: BBL National League Division 2 champions (1994); Ivy League Player of the Year (1987); Honorable mention All-American – AP (1985); 3× First-team All-Ivy League (1985–1987); MAAC Rookie of the Year (1983); As head coach: BBL National League Division 2 champions (1994)
- Stats at Basketball Reference

Perry D. Bromwell (born c. 1964) is an American former professional basketball player and coach. His international playing career took him to Norway, the Philippines, and England, the latter of which saw him win the British Basketball League National League Division 2 as a player-coach. In college, Bromwell was the 1987 Ivy League Player of the Year.

== Playing career ==
=== High school ===
Bromwell, a native of Boston, Massachusetts, played for Don Bosco Technical High School from his freshman through junior years. For his senior year, he transferred to Avon Old Farms, an all-boy boarding school in Avon, Connecticut. He led them in scoring and helped guide them to a 15–8 record. Perry was elected captain and named the most valuable player on Avon's basketball team.

=== College ===
In 1982–83, Bromwell enrolled at Manhattan College to play for the Jaspers under head coach Gordon Chiesa. He averaged 13.2 points and 2.5 rebounds per game and was named the Metro Atlantic Athletic Conference Rookie of the Year. After just one season he decided to transfer to Penn in the Ivy League. He had to redshirt 1983–84 per NCAA by-laws.

As a redshirt sophomore in 1984–85, Bromwell made an immediate impact. He led the Quakers in scoring with 15.3 points per game (ppg) while also chipping in 3.1 rebounds and 1.7 assists. Penn finished with a 10–4 conference record, tops in the league, as Bromwell garnered numerous accolades – he received an honorable mention nod as an NCAA All-American, was named to the All-Ivy League First Team, and was named co-MVP by his Penn teammates. The following season, Bromwell continued his solid play with 13.5 ppg, 2.3 rpg, and 2.4 apg. The Quakers finished second in the Ivy, while Bromwell secured his second consecutive All-Ivy League First Team selection.

Bromwell's senior season at Penn (1986–87) saw the Quakers finished atop the Ivy League with a 10–4 conference record. He was second in scoring at 18.6 ppg (including recording double-digits in the final 22 games of his career), earned his third straight All-Ivy League First Team honor, and capped his Penn career by being named the Ivy League Player of the Year.

In just three seasons at Penn, Bromwell scored 1,265 points and is the school's season and career leader in three-point field goal percentage (50.6% his senior year, the first year the three-point shot was introduced). Including his stint at Manhattan, Bromwell scored 1,607 points at the Division I level. He was later inducted into Penn's Athletic Hall of Fame in 2003.

=== Professional ===
Bromwell was selected by the New Jersey Nets in the 1987 NBA draft in the sixth round with the 118th overall pick. He was waived before the start of the season and never appeared in an NBA game. He instead pursued an international career, playing in England, Norway, and the Philippines.

== Coaching career and later life ==
Bromwell earned his first coaching opportunity in 1993–94 as a player-coach for the Nottingham Cobras in the British Basketball League (BBL), where he led the team to the BBL National League Division 2 championship. He then took over as head coach at the University of Nottingham for the next two seasons before finishing out his professional playing career for the next two years (1996–1998). Bromwell returned to the United States in 1998. He had short stints as an assistant coach for Ursinus and Frostburg State before moving to Florida in 2000 to teach and coach at the high school level. Six years later, an assistant coaching opportunity opened up at his alma mater, Penn. Bromwell inquired about it and was offered the position. He spent the next three seasons coaching the Quakers before stepping away from coaching altogether.

Since coaching, Bromwell has authored a book for student-athletes preparing for college called The Student Athletes Handbook: The Complete Guide for Success, and founded multiple companies: 4Casting, an alkaline water filtration machine and micro-current therapy modality to sport teams and rehabilitation centers; and C3GYE, investments in building sustainable green villas for sub-Saharan countries.
