= Canisius Golden Griffins men's basketball =

Men's college basketball team for Canisius University

Canisius Golden Griffins
| 2025–26 Canisius Golden Griffins men's basketball team |
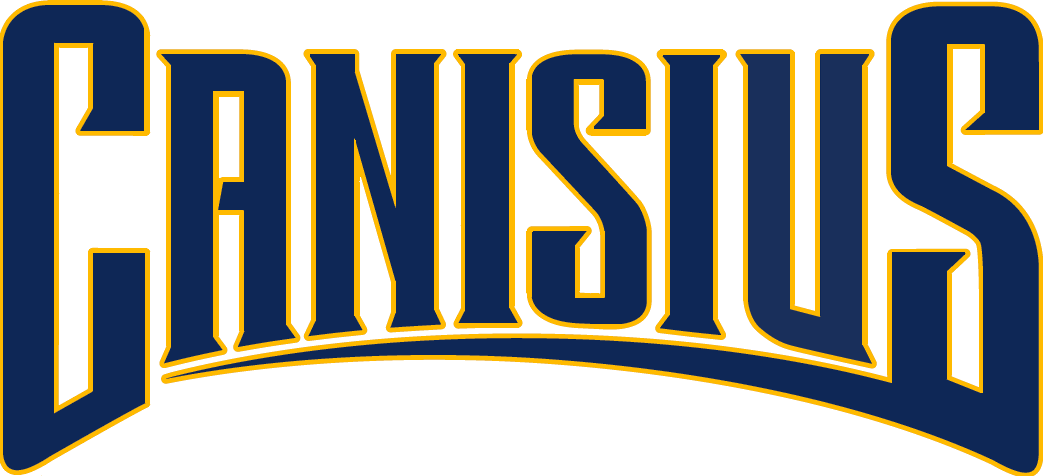
- University: Canisius University
- All-time record: 1306–1266 (.508)
- Head coach: Jim Christian (2nd season)
- Conference: MAAC
- Location: Buffalo, New York
- Arena: Koessler Center (capacity: 2,196)
- Nickname: Golden Griffins
- Colors: Blue and gold

Uniforms
| Home | Away |

NCAA tournament Elite Eight
- 1955, 1956
Other NCAA tournament results
| Sweet Sixteen | 1955, 1956, 1957 |
| Appearances | 1955, 1956, 1957, 1996 |

Conference tournament champions
- 1996

Conference regular-season champions
- 1994, 1996, 2018; America East: 1985; Little Three: 1947, 1950, 1952, 1956, 1957

For information on all Canisius University sports, see Canisius Golden Griffins

The Canisius Golden Griffins men's basketball team, or the Griffs, represent Canisius University in Buffalo, New York, United States. Canisius is a member of the Metro Atlantic Athletic Conference and play their home games at Koessler Center. Canisius has appeared in the NCAA tournament four times, most recently in 1996. In 1955 and 1956, the Golden Griffins appeared in the NCAA tournament Elite Eight.

== Golden Griffins in the ABA/NBA ==
- Andrew Anderson, played for the Oakland Oaks, Miami Floridians and Los Angeles Stars (1967–70)
- Leroy Chollet, played for the Syracuse Nationals (1949–51)
- Larry Fogle, played for the New York Knicks (1975–76)
- Herm Hedderick, played for the New York Knicks (1955–56)
- Charles Jordan, played for Indiana Pacers (1975–76)
- Mike Macaluso, played for Buffalo Braves (1973–74)
- Bob MacKinnon, played for Syracuse Nationals (1949–50)
- Anthony Masiello, played for the Indiana Pacers (1969–70) and later served three terms as mayor of Buffalo (1993–2005).
- Al Masino, played for four teams (1952–54)
- Johnny McCarthy, played for the 1963–64 NBA Champion Boston Celtics; first of just four players in NBA history to record a triple-double in their playoff debut with the other three being Nikola Jokić, LeBron James and Magic Johnson.
- John Morrison, played for Denver Rockets (1967–68)
- Mike Smrek ’85, played for the 1986–87 and 1987–88 NBA Champion Los Angeles Lakers
- Mel Thurston played for the Tri-City Blackhawks 1940–42

=== Other notables ===
- Darrell Barley, 1996 Metro Atlantic Athletic Conference Men's Basketball Player of the Year
- Darren Fenn, owner of the Buffalo eXtreme
- Ray Hall, all-time leader in scoring and steals
- Malik Johnson, all-time leader in assists
- Chris Manhertz, signed by Buffalo Bills as undrafted free agent, played for New Orleans Saints, Carolina Panthers, Jacksonville Jaguars, and Denver Broncos (2015-present)
- Craig Wise, 1995 Metro Atlantic Athletic Conference Men's Basketball Player of the Year
- Eyal Yaffe (born 1960), Israeli basketball player, Israeli Basketball Premier League
- Thomas Hardiman played handball at the 1972 Summer Olympics

== Postseason tournaments ==
=== NCAA tournament results ===
The Griffins have appeared in four NCAA Tournaments. Their combined record is 6–4.

| Year | Round | Opponent | Result |
|---|---|---|---|
| 1955 | First round Regional semifinals Regional Finals | Williams; Villanova; La Salle | W 73–60; W 73–71; L 64–99 |
| 1956 | First round Regional semifinals Regional Finals | NC State; Dartmouth; Temple | W 79–78 ^{4OT} W 66–58; L 58–60 |
| 1957 | First round Regional semifinals Regional 3rd-place game | West Virginia; North Carolina; Lafayette | W 64–56; L 75–87; W 82–76 |
| 1996 | First round | Utah | L 43–72 |

=== NIT results ===
The Griffins have appeared in five National Invitation Tournaments (NIT). Their combined record is 5–6.

| Year | Round | Opponent | Result |
|---|---|---|---|
| 1944 | Quarterfinals | Oklahoma A&M | L 43–29 |
| 1963 | Quarterfinals; Semifinals; Finals | Memphis; Villanova; Providence | W 76–67; W 61–46; L 66–81 |
| 1985 | First round | Nebraska | L 66–79 |
| 1994 | First round | Villanova | L 79–103 |
| 1995 | First round Second Round; Quarterfinals; Semifinals; 3rd-place game | Seton Hall; Bradley; Washington State; Virginia Tech; Penn State | W 83–71; W 55–53; W 99–90; L 59–71; L 62–66 |

=== CIT results ===
The Griffins have appeared in four CollegeInsider.com Postseason Tournaments (CIT). Their combined record is 4–4.

| Year | Round | Opponent | Result |
|---|---|---|---|
| 2013 | First round Second Round; Quarterfinals | Elon; Youngstown State; Evansville | W 69–53; W 84–82 ^{OT} L 83–84 |
| 2014 | First round | VMI | L 100–111 |
| 2015 | First round Second Round; Quarterfinals | Dartmouth; Bowling Green; NJIT | W 87–72; W 82–59; L 73–78 |
| 2017 | First round | Samford | L 74–78 |

=== CBI results ===
The Griffins have appeared in one College Basketball Invitational. Their record is 0–1.

| Year | Round | Opponent | Result |
|---|---|---|---|
| 2018 | First round | Jacksonville State | L 78–80^{OT} |
