= Quinnipiac Bobcats men's basketball =

2026–27 Quinnipiac Bobcats men's basketball team
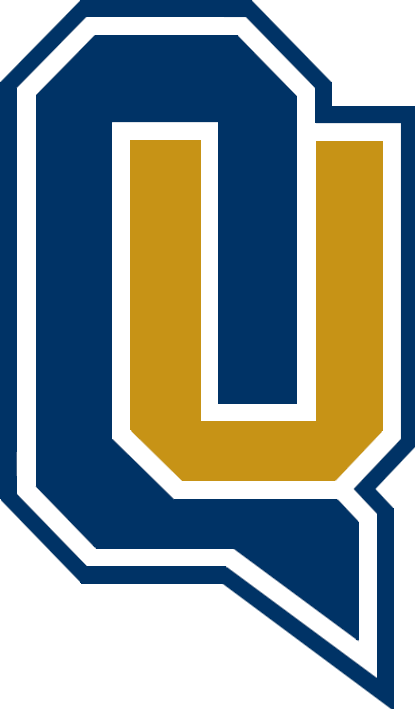
- University: Quinnipiac University
- Head coach: Tom Pecora (4th season)
- Location: Hamden, Connecticut
- Arena: M&T Bank Arena (capacity: 3,570)
- Conference: The Metro
- Nickname: Bobcats
- Colors: Navy and gold
- All-time record: 1003–935 (.518)

NCAA Division I tournament round of 32
- 1976*, 1979*, 1980*, 1988*

NCAA Division I tournament appearances
- 1976*, 1979*, 1980*, 1988*

Conference tournament champions
- NE-10: 1988*; 1975*, 1977*, 1978*

Conference regular-season champions
- NEC: 2010; MAAC: 2024, 2025
- * at Division II level

The Quinnipiac Bobcats men's basketball team represents Quinnipiac University in Hamden, Connecticut, United States. The school's team currently competes in the Metro Atlantic Athletic Conference. They are currently coached by Tom Pecora and play their home games at the M&T Bank Arena. The Bobcats have never appeared in the NCAA tournament.

== Conference affiliations ==
- New England Collegiate Conference – 1981–82 to 1986–87
- Northeast-10 Conference – 1987–88 to 1997–98
- Northeast Conference – 1998–99 to 2012–13
- Metro Atlantic Athletic Conference – 2013–14 to Present

== History ==
=== 1996–2007 ===
Joe DeSantis was the fifth head coach in Quinnipiac history. He led the Bobcats during their transition from Division II to Division I. DeSantis's best season was in 1999–2000 when the team went 18–10 and DeSantis won NEC Coach of the Year. On March 8, 2007, DeSantis was fired after 11 years. His record was 118–188.

=== 2007–2017 ===
Tom Moore was hired in 2007 to replace Joe DeSantis. In Moore's first season, the team went 15–15 and finished fifth in the Northeast Conference. After a 15–16 2008–09 season, Moore and the Bobcats went 23–10, finishing first in the NEC, winning the schools first Northeast Conference regular season title, but failed to win the conference tournament. The team received a bid to the NIT, losing in the first round to Virginia Tech, 81–61. The next season the Bobcats went 22–10 and earned a bid to the CIT, losing in the first round to Buffalo, 75–68. In 2011–12 the team finished 18–14, earned a bid to the CBI, and lost in the first round to Pennsylvania, 74–63. In 2013 Quinnipiac moved to the Metro Atlantic and went 20–12 in their first season. They earned a bid to the CIT and lost in the first round to Yale, 69–68. Moore was fired on March 7, 2017.

== Postseason ==
=== NCAA Division II tournament results ===
The Bobcats have appeared in four NCAA Division II tournaments. Their combined record is 1-7.

Year	Round	Opponent	Result
1976	Regional semifinals Regional 3rd-place game	Bridgeport; Bentley	L 86–93; L 77–83
1979	Regional semifinals Regional 3rd-place game	Bridgeport; Bentley	L 75–92; L 93–104
1980	Regional semifinals Regional 3rd-place game	New Hampshire College; Bryant	L 79–92; W 93–88
1988	Regional semifinals Regional 3rd Place	New Haven; Assumption	L 62–96; L 73–88

=== NAIA tournament results ===
The Bobcats have appeared in two NAIA tournaments. Their combined record is 1–2.

Year	Round	Opponent	Result
1972	First round	Belhaven	L 64–75
1973	First round Second Round	Ouachita Baptist; Slippery Rock	W 79–66; L 75–104

=== NIT results ===
The Bobcats have appeared in the National Invitation Tournament (NIT) one time. Their record is 0–1.

Year	Round	Opponent	Result
2010	First round	Virginia Tech	L 61–81

=== CBI results ===
The Bobcats have appeared in the College Basketball Invitational (CBI) twice. Their record is 0–2.

Year	Round	Opponent	Result
2012	First round	Penn	L 63–74
2024	First round	Evansville	L 63–64

=== CIT results ===
The Bobcats have appeared in the CollegeInsider.com Postseason Tournament (CIT) three times. Their combined record is 0–3.

Year	Round	Opponent	Result
2011	First round	Buffalo	L 68–75
2014	First round	Yale	L 68–69
2019	First round	NJIT	L 81–92

== Bobcats playing in international leagues ==
- Evan Conti (born 1993), American-Israeli basketball player and coach
- James Feldeine (born 1988), American-Dominican basketball player in the Israeli Basketball Premier League
- Cameron Young (born 1996), basketball player for Hapoel Haifa of the Israeli Basketball Premier League
