= List of Bucknell Bison men's basketball seasons =

The following is a list of results, conference championships and post-season tournaments accomplished by the Bucknell Bison men's basketball team over the last 129 season all in NCAA Division I.

== Seasons ==
Conference champions *	Conference tournament champions †	Postseason berth ‡

Season	Head coach	Conference	Season results							Conference tournament	Postseason result		
Season	Head coach	Conference	Overall			Conference				Conference tournament	Postseason result		
Season	Head coach	Conference	Wins	Losses	%	Wins	Losses	%	Finish	Conference tournament	Postseason result		
Bucknell Bison
1895–96	student coaches	Independent	1	3	.350	—	—	—	—	—	—	—	—
1896–97	student coaches	Independent	4	1	.800	—	—	—	—	—	—	—	—
1897–98	student coaches	Independent	4	4	.500	—	—	—	—	—	—	—	—
1898–99	student coaches	Independent	3	5	.375	—	—	—	—	—	—	—	—
1899–1900	student coaches	Independent	6	3	.667	—	—	—	—	—	—	—	—
1900–01	student coaches	Independent	12	1	.925	—	—	—	—	—	—	—	—
1901–02	student coaches	Independent	13	2	.867	—	—	—	—	—	—	—	—
1902–03	student coaches	Independent	10	0	1.000	—	—	—	—	—	—	—	—
1903–04	student coaches	Independent	7	5	.583	—	—	—	—	—	—	—	—
1904–05	student coaches	Independent	8	1	.889	—	—	—	—	—	—	—	—
1905–06	student coaches	Independent	10	2	.833	—	—	—	—	—	—	—	—
1906–07	student coaches	Independent	10	1	.909	—	—	—	—	—	—	—	—
1907–08	student coaches	Independent	12	0	1.000	—	—	—	—	—	—	—	—
1908–09	Doc Hoskins	Independent	5	6	.445	—	—	—	—	—	—	—	—
1909–10	Doc Hoskins	Independent	10	6	.625	—	—	—	—	—	—	—	—
1910–11	Doc Hoskins	Independent	4	13	.235	—	—	—	—	—	—	—	—
1911–12	C. Fulmer	Independent	4	8	.333	—	—	—	—	—	—	—	—
1912–13	H. E. Zehner	Independent	4	13	.235	—	—	—	—	—	—	—	—
1913–14	DJ Staffer	Independent	4	8	.333	—	—	—	—	—	—	—	—
1914–15	George Cockill	Independent	5	11	.313	—	—	—	—	—	—	—	—
1915–16	George Cockill	Independent	10	3	.769	—	—	—	—	—	—	—	—
1916–17	George Cockill	Independent	11	5	.688	—	—	—	—	—	—	—	—
1917–18	Malcolm Musser	Independent	11	3	.786	—	—	—	—	—	—	—	—
1918–19	Henry Benfer	Independent	13	3	.813	—	—	—	—	—	—	—	—
1919–20	Malcolm Musser	Independent	14	6	.700	—	—	—	—	—	—	—	—
1920-21	Clarence Glass	Independent	12	4	.750	—	—	—	—	—	—	—	—
1921–22	Clarence Glass	Independent	8	10	.444	—	—	—	—	—	—	—	—
1922–23	Clarence Glass	Independent	9	11	.450	—	—	—	—	—	—	—	—
1923–24	Moose McCormick	Independent	1	5	.167	—	—	—	—	—	—	—	—
1924–25	Moose McCormick	Independent	1	4	.200	—	—	—	—	—	—	—	—
1925–26	John Plant	Independent	8	4	.667	—	—	—	—	—	—	—	—
1926–27	John Plant	Independent	14	4	.778	—	—	—	—	—	—	—	—
1927–28	John Plant	Independent	16	5	.762	—	—	—	—	—	—	—	—
1928–29	John Plant	Independent	10	8	.556	—	—	—	—	—	—	—	—
1929–30	John Plant	Independent	6	12	.333	—	—	—	—	—	—	—	—
1930–31	John Plant	Independent	6	11	.353	—	—	—	—	—	—	—	—
1931–32	Malcolm Mausser	Independent	7	9	.438	—	—	—	—	—	—	—	—
1932–33	Malcolm Mausser	Independent	6	8	.429	—	—	—	—	—	—	—	—
1933–34	Malcolm Mausser	EIC	2	16	.111	0	7	.000	6th	—	—	—	—
1934–35	Malcolm Mausser	Independent	0	14	.000	—	—	—	—	—	—	—	—
1935–36	Malcolm Mausser	Independent	13	4	.765	—	—	—	—	—	—	—	—
1936–37	Malcolm Mausser	Independent	9	7	.563	—	—	—	—	—	—	—	—
1937–38	Malcolm Mausser	Independent	7	6	.538	—	—	—	—	—	—	—	—
1938-39	Malcolm Mausser	Independent	8	8	.500	—	—	—	—	—	—		
1939–40	Malcolm Mausser	Independent	13	7	.588	—	—	—	—	—	—		
1940–41	Malcolm Mausser	Independent	10	7	.588	—	—	—	—	—	—		
1941–42	Malcolm Mausser	Independent	9	9	.500	—	—	—	—	—	—		
1942–43	Woody Ludwig	Independent	5	8	.385	—	—	—	—	—	—		
1943–44	Woody Ludwig	Independent	9	3	.750	—	—	—	—	—	—		
1944–45	Woody Ludwig	Independent	10	7	.588	—	—	—	—	—	—		
1945–46	Woody Ludwig	MASC	6	11	.353	2	6	.250	4th	—	—		
1946–47	Woody Ludwig	MASC	11	8	.579	6	3	.667	4th	—	—		
1947–48	Jack Guy	MASC	5	17	.227	2	6	.250	4th	—	—		
1948–49	Jack Guy	MASC	2	18	.100	0	8	.000	5th	—	—		
1949–50	Jack Guy	Independent	5	16	.238	—	—	—	—	—	—		
1950–51	Jack Guy	Independent	9	13	.409	—	—	—	—	—	—		
1951–52	Jack Guy	Independent	8	16	.333	—	—	—	—	—	—		
1952–53	Ben Gribbs	Independent	3	16	.158	—	—	—	—	—	—		
1953–54	Ben Gribbs	Independent	4	16	.200	—	—	—	—	—	—		
1954–55	Ben Gribbs	Independent	3	18	.143	—	—	—	—	—	—		
1955–56	Ben Gribbs	Independent	10	14	.417	—	—	—	—	—	—		
1956–57	Ben Gribbs	Independent	16	8	.667	—	—	—	—	—	—		
1957–58	Ben Gribbs	Independent	16	8	.617	—	—	—	—	—	—		
1958–59	Ben Gribbs	Mid-Atlantic	16	7	.696	6	5	.545	4th	—	—		
1959–60	Ben Gribbs	Mid-Atlantic	10	11	.476	6	5	.545	5th	—	—		
1960–61	Ben Gribbs	Mid-Atlantic	12	11	.522	5	6	.454	T-6th	—	—		
1961–62	Ben Gribbs	Mid-Atlantic	7	15	.318	2	9	.182	9th	—	—		
1962–63	Gene Evans	Mid-Atlantic	7	16	.304	2	8	.200	8th	—	—		
1963–64	Gene Evans	Mid-Atlantic	8	13	.318	3	7	.300	7th	—	—		
1964–65	Don Smith	Mid-Atlantic	11	13	.458	**	**	**	**	—	—		
1965–66	Don Smith	Mid-Atlantic	15	10	.600	**	**	**	**	—	—		
1966–67	Don Smith	Mid-Atlantic	11	11	.500	**	**	**	**	—	—		
1967–68	Don Smith	Mid-Atlantic	12	11	.522	**	**	**	**	—	—		
1968–69	Don Smith	Mid-Atlantic	13	11	.542	**	**	**	**	—	—		
1969–70	Don Smith	Mid-Atlantic	6	17	.261	3	7	.300	5th (West)	—	—		
1970–71	Don Smith	Mid-Atlantic	9	14	.391	4	6	.400	T-4th (West)	—	—		
1971–72	Don Smith	Mid-Atlantic	5	18	.217	3	7	.300	T-4th (West)	—	—		
1972–73	Jim Valvano	Mid-Atlantic	11	14	.440	6	4	.600	T-2nd (West)	—	—		
1973–74	Jim Valvano	Mid-Atlantic	8	16	.333	2	8	.200	T-5th (West)	—	—		
1974–75	Jim Valvano	ECC	14	12	.538	4	4	.500	T-3rd (West)	—	—		
1975–76	Charles Woollum	ECC	13	13	.500	5	5	.500	T-3rd (West)	—	—		
1976–77	Charles Woollum	ECC	10	15	.400	5	5	.500	4th (West)	—	—		
1977–78	Charles Woollum	ECC	13	15	.464	5	5	.500	T-2nd (West)	—	—		
1978–79	Charles Woollum	ECC	18	9	.667	12	6	.667	1st (West)	—	—		
1979–80	Charles Woollum	ECC	20	7	.741	13	3	.813	T-1st (West)	—	—		
1980–81	Charles Woollum	ECC	12	16	.429	6	10	.375	T-3rd (West)	—	—		
1981–82	Charles Woollum	ECC	7	20	.295	3	13	.188	T-5th (West)	—	—		
1982–83	Charles Woollum	ECC	17	11	.607	8	5	.615	2nd (West)	—	—		
1983–84	Charles Woollum	ECC	24	5	.828	12	2	.875	1st (West)	—	—		
1984–85	Charles Woollum	ECC	19	10	.665	10	4	.714	1st (West)	—	—		
1985–86	Charles Woollum	ECC	17	13	.567	8	6	.571	2nd (West)	—	—		
1986–87	Charles Woollum	ECC	22	9	.710	11	3	.786	1st (West)	Champions	NCAA first round		
1987–88	Charles Woollum	ECC	16	12	.571	7	7	.500	5th	—	—		
1988–89	Charles Woollum	ECC	23	8	.742	11	3	.786	1st	Champions	NCAA first round		
1989–90	Charles Woollum	ECC	15	14	.517	6	8	.428	7th	—	—		
1990–91	Charles Woollum	Patriot League	18	13	.581	7	5	.583	4th	—	—		
1991–92	Charles Woollum	Patriot League	21	9	.700	11	3	.786	T-1st	—	—		
1992–93	Charles Woollum	Patriot League	23	6	.793	13	1	.929	1st	—	—		
1993–94	Charles Woollum	Patriot League	10	17	.370	6	8	.429	T-4th	—	—		
1994–95	Pat Flannery	Patriot League	13	14	.418	11	3	.786	1st	Runners-up	—		
1995–96	Pat Flannery	Patriot League	17	11	.607	8	4	.667	T-2nd	—	—		
1996–97	Pat Flannery	Patriot League	18	11	.621	9	3	.750	2nd	Runners-up	—		
1997–98	Pat Flannery	Patriot League	13	15	.464	8	4	.667	3rd	Runners-up	—		
1998–99	Pat Flannery	Patriot League	16	13	.552	9	3	.750	T-2nd	—	—		
1999–2000	Pat Flannery	Patriot League	17	11	.607	8	4	.667	3rd	—	—		
2000–01	Pat Flannery	Patriot League	14	15	.483	4	8	.333	6th	—	—		
2001–02	Pat Flannery	Patriot League	13	16	.448	8	6	.571	T-3rd	—	—		
2002–03	Pat Flannery	Patriot League	14	15	.438	7	7	.500	5th	—	—		
2003–04	Pat Flannery	Patriot League	14	15	.448	9	5	.643	T-4th	—	—		
2004–05	Pat Flannery	Patriot League	23	10	.697	10	4	.713	2nd	Champions	NCAA second round		
2005–06	Pat Flannery	Patriot League	27	5	.844	14	0	1.000	1st	Champions	NCAA second round		
2006–07	Pat Flannery	Patriot League	22	9	.710	13	1	.929	T-1st	—	—		
2007–08	Pat Flannery	Patriot League	12	19	.387	6	8	.429	7th	—	—		
2008–09	Dave Paulsen	Patriot League	7	23	.223	4	10	.286	7th	—	—		
2009–10	Dave Paulsen	Patriot League	14	17	.462	9	5	.643	2nd	—	—		
2010–11	Dave Paulsen	Patriot League	25	9	.735	13	1	.929	1st	Champions	NCAA second round		
2011–12	Dave Paulsen	Patriot League	25	10	.714	12	2	.857	1st	Runners-up	NIT second round		
2012–13	Dave Paulsen	Patriot League	28	6	.824	12	2	.857	1st	Champions	NCAA second round		
2013–14	Dave Paulsen	Patriot League	16	14	.533	11	7	.611	4th	—	—		
2014–15	Dave Paulsen	Patriot League	19	15	.559	13	5	.722	1st	—	NIT first round		
2015–16	Nathan Davis	Patriot League	17	14	.548	14	4	.778	1st	—	NIT first round		
2016–17	Nathan Davis	Patriot League	26	8	.758	15	3	.833	1st	Champions	NCAA tournament		
2017–18	Nathan Davis	Patriot League	25	10	.714	16	2	.889	1st	Champions	NCAA tournament		
2018–19	Nathan Davis	Patriot League	21	12	.636	13	5	.722	T-1st	Runners-up	—		
2019–20	Nathan Davis	Patriot League	14	20	.412	8	10	.444	T-6th	Semifinals	—		
2020–21	Nathan Davis	Patriot League	5	7	.417	4	6	.400	2nd (Central)	Semifinals	—		
2021–22	Nathan Davis	Patriot League	9	23	.281	5	13	.278	9th	Quarterfinals	—		
2022–23	Nathan Davis	Patriot League	12	20	.375	5	13	.278	10th	First round	—		
2023–24	John Griffin III	Patriot League	14	19	.424	10	8	.556	T-2nd	Semifinals	—		
2024–25	John Griffin III	Patriot League	18	15	.545	13	5	.722	T-1st	Semifinals	—		
2025–26	John Griffin III	Patriot League	10	23	.303	6	12	.333	8th	Quarterfinals	—		
Total			1,530	1,355	.530								
