= 2016–17 Lehigh Mountain Hawks men's basketball team =

American college basketball season

2016–17 Lehigh Mountain Hawks men's basketball
- Conference: Patriot League
- Record: 20–12 (12–6 Patriot)
- Head coach: Brett Reed (10th season)
- Assistant coaches: Antoni Wyche; Harry Morra; Austen Rowland
- Home arena: Stabler Arena

2016–17 Patriot League men's basketball standings
	Conf.				Overall
Team	W		L	PCT	W		L	PCT
Bucknell †	15	–	3	.833	26	–	9	.743
Lehigh	12	–	6	.667	20	–	12	.625
Boston University	12	–	6	.667	18	–	14	.563
Navy	10	–	8	.556	16	–	16	.500
Holy Cross	9	–	9	.500	15	–	17	.469
Loyola (MD)	8	–	10	.444	16	–	17	.485
Colgate	8	–	10	.444	10	–	22	.313
Army	6	–	12	.333	13	–	19	.406
Lafayette	5	–	13	.278	9	–	21	.300
American	5	–	13	.278	8	–	22	.267
† 2017 Patriot League tournament winner

The 2016–17 Lehigh Mountain Hawks men's basketball team represented Lehigh University during the 2016–17 NCAA Division I men's basketball season. The Mountain Hawks, led by 10th-year head coach Brett Reed, played their home games at Stabler Arena in Bethlehem, Pennsylvania as members of the Patriot League.

They finished the season 20–12, 12–6 in Patriot League play to finish in a tie for second place. As the No. 3 seed in the Patriot League tournament, they defeated Colgate and Boston University before losing to Bucknell in the championship game. Despite having 20 wins, they did not participate in a postseason tournament.

== Previous season ==
The Mountain Hawks finished the 2015–16 season 17–15, 13–5 in Patriot League play to finish in second place. They defeated Navy and American to advance to the championship game of the Patriot League tournament where they lost to Holy Cross.

== Offseason ==
=== Departures ===
Name	Number	Pos.	Height	Weight	Year	Hometown	Notes
Tyler Jenkins	11	G	6'1"	175	Sophomore	Fishers, IN	Transferred to Bellarmine
John Ross Glover	20	G/F	6'4"	195	Senior	Hendersonville, TN	Graduated
Georgios Pilitsis	23	G	6'2"	185	Junior	Thessaloniki, Greece	Walk-on; left the team for personal reasons
Jesse Chuku	31	F	6'9"	225	Senior	London, England	Graduated
Justin Goldsborough	40	F	6'8"	210	Senior	Fort Washington, MD	Graduated

=== Incoming transfers ===
Name	Number	Pos.	Height	Weight	Year	Hometown	Previous school
Lance Tejada	22	G	6'2"	190	Junior	Pompano Beach, FL	Transferred from East Carolina. Under NCAA transfer rules, Tejada will have to sit out for the 2016–17 season. Will have two years of remaining eligibility.

=== 2016 recruiting class ===
College recruiting information
Name	Hometown	School	Height	Weight	Commit date
Pat Andree #60 PF	Colts Neck, NJ	Christian Brothers Academy	6 ft 7 in (2.01 m)	205 lb (93 kg)	Aug 30, 2015
Pat Andree #60 PF	Recruit ratings: Scout: Rivals: (70)				
Jordan Cohen #68 PG	North Hollywood, CA	Campbell Hall High School	5 ft 10 in (1.78 m)	155 lb (70 kg)	Sep 15, 2015
Jordan Cohen #68 PG	Recruit ratings: Scout: Rivals: (66)				
Jack Lieb; C	Deerfield, IL	Brewster Academy	6 ft 10 in (2.08 m)	230 lb (100 kg)	Oct 14, 2015
Jack Lieb; C	Recruit ratings: Scout: Rivals: (63)				
Overall recruit ranking:
Note: In many cases, Scout, Rivals, 247Sports, On3, and ESPN may conflict in their listings of height and weight.; In these cases, the average was taken. ESPN grades are on a 100-point scale.; Sources: "2016 Team Ranking". Rivals.

=== 2017 recruiting class ===
College recruiting information (2017)
Name	Hometown	School	Height	Weight	Commit date
Marques Wilson #47 SG	Edmond, OK	Edmond North High School	6 ft 4 in (1.93 m)	N/A	
Marques Wilson #47 SG	Recruit ratings: Scout: Rivals: (78)				
Caleb Bennett; SG	St. Joseph, MO	Lafayette High School	6 ft 4 in (1.93 m)	185 lb (84 kg)	
Caleb Bennett; SG	Recruit ratings: Scout: Rivals: (NR)				
Overall recruit ranking:
Note: In many cases, Scout, Rivals, 247Sports, On3, and ESPN may conflict in their listings of height and weight.; In these cases, the average was taken. ESPN grades are on a 100-point scale.; Sources: "2017 Team Ranking". Rivals.

== Roster ==
2016–17 Lehigh Mountain Hawks men's basketball team
Players
Coaches

Pos.	#	Name	Height	Weight	Year	Previous school	Hometown
G	1	Kahron Ross	5 ft 11 in (1.8 m)	160 lb (73 kg)	Jr	Jonesboro HS	Jonesboro, AR
G	4	Devon Carter	6 ft 4 in (1.93 m)	190 lb (86 kg)	Sr	John Hay HS	Cleveland, OH
G	5	Austin Price	6 ft 4 in (1.93 m)	185 lb (84 kg)	Sr	Detroit Country Day HS	Indianapolis, IN
G	10	Kyle Leufroy	6 ft 3 in (1.91 m)	195 lb (88 kg)	So	Prolific Prep	Pasadena, CA
G	11	Jordan Cohen	6 ft 1 in (1.85 m)	185 lb (84 kg)	Fr	Campbell Hall	Tarzana, CA
F	13	Matt Holba	6 ft 7 in (2.01 m)	215 lb (98 kg)	So	Guerin Catholic HS	Noblesville, IN
G	15	Jay Jay Davis (W)	5 ft 10 in (1.78 m)	150 lb (68 kg)	Jr	William Allen HS	Allentown, PA
F/C	21	Jack Lieb	6 ft 10 in (2.08 m)	235 lb (107 kg)	Fr	Brewster Academy	Deerfield, IL
G	22	Lance Tejada (I) (redshirt)	6 ft 2 in (1.88 m)	190 lb (86 kg)	Jr	Blanche Ely; East Carolina	Miramar, FL
F	31	Pat Andree	6 ft 8 in (2.03 m)	225 lb (102 kg)	Fr	Christian Brothers Academy	Lincroft, NJ
F/C	32	Tim Kempton Jr.	6 ft 10 in (2.08 m)	245 lb (111 kg)	Sr	Brophy College Prep	Scottsdale, AZ
F/C	40	Josh Wolf (W)	6 ft 10 in (2.08 m)	225 lb (102 kg)	Fr	Williston Northampton	Glencoe, IL
G	42	Brandon Alston	6 ft 5 in (1.96 m)	200 lb (91 kg)	Jr	Herndon HS	Vienna, VA
C	55	Caleb Sedore	6 ft 11 in (2.11 m)	230 lb (104 kg)	So	Pulaski HS	Pulaski, NY

Head coach

- Brett Reed (Wayne State (MI))

Assistant coach(es)

- Antoni Wyche (Notre Dame)
- Harry Morra (DeSales)
- Austen Rowland (Lehigh)

Legend

- (C) Team captain
- (S) Suspended
- (I) Ineligible
- (W) Walk-on
- Injured
- Current redshirt

Roster

== Schedule and results ==
Date time, TV	Rank^{#}	Opponent^{#}	Result	Record	Site (attendance) city, state
Non-conference regular season
Nov 11*; 7:00 pm, FCS		at No. 7 Xavier	L 81–84	0–1	Cintas Center (10,250); Cincinnati, OH
Nov 17*; 7:00 pm		at Yale	L 81–89 ^{OT}	0–2	John J. Lee Amphitheater (1,062); New Haven, CT
Nov 20*; 2:00 pm		Princeton	W 76–67	1–2	Stabler Arena (1,388); Bethlehem, PA
Nov 25*; 8:00 pm		at Mississippi State	W 87–73	2–2	Humphrey Coliseum (6,697); Starkville, MS
Nov 27*; 2:30 pm		at Arkansas State	W 97–89	2–3	Convocation Center (2,074); Jonesboro, AR
Nov 30*; 7:00 pm		at La Salle	W 89–81	2–4	Tom Gola Arena (1,695); Philadelphia, PA
Dec 3*; 2:00 pm		at Robert Morris	W 64–58	3–4	Stabler Arena (1,003); Bethlehem, PA
Dec 6*; 7:00 pm		at Stony Brook	W 62–57	3–5	Island Federal Credit Union Arena (2,295); Stony Brook, NY
Dec 10*; 4:00 pm		at Mount St. Mary's	W 90–71	4–5	Knott Arena (1,464); Emmitsburg, MD
Dec 12*; 7:00 pm		Saint Francis (PA)	W 100–67	5–5	Stabler Arena (774); Bethlehem, PA
Dec 22*; 7:00 pm		Cabrini	W 93–72	6–5	Stabler Arena (741); Bethlehem, PA
Patriot League regular season
Dec 30; 7:00 pm		at Army	W 66–59	7–5 (1–0)	Christl Arena (1,558); West Point, NY
Jan 2; 2:00 pm		at Boston University	L 61–75	7–6 (1–1)	Case Gym (484); Boston, MA
Jan 5; 7:00 pm, SE2		Loyola (MD)	L 83–84	7–7 (1–2)	Stabler Arena (832); Bethlehem, PA
Jan 8; 2:00 pm, SE2		American	W 79–73	8–7 (2–2)	Stabler Arena (937); Bethlehem, PA
Jan 11; 7:00 pm		at Bucknell	W 82–71	9–7 (3–2)	Sojka Pavilion (2,254); Lewisburg, PA
Jan 14; 2:00 pm, SE2		Holy Cross	W 68–51	10–7 (4–2)	Stabler Arena (1,261); Bethlehem, PA
Jan 18; 7:00 pm		at Navy	L 72–75	10–8 (4–3)	Alumni Hall (1,292); Annapolis, MD
Jan 21; 2:00 pm, SE2		Lafayette	W 75–68	11–8 (5–3)	Stabler Arena (2,103); Bethlehem, PA
Jan 25; 7:00 pm		at Colgate	W 76–62	12–8 (6–3)	Cotterell Court (834); Hamilton, NY
Jan 30; 7:00 pm, CBSSN		Boston University	L 59–76	12–9 (6–4)	Stabler Arena (1,302); Bethlehem, PA
Feb 1; 7:30 pm		at Loyola (MD)	L 60–62	12–10 (6–5)	Reitz Arena (623); Baltimore, MD
Feb 4; 2:00 pm		at American	W 70–55	13–10 (7–5)	Bender Arena (984); Washington, D.C.
Feb 8; 7:00 pm, SE2		Bucknell	W 79–71	14–10 (8–5)	Stabler Arena (1,241); Bethlehem, PA
Feb 12; 12:00 pm		at Holy Cross	L 45–61	14–11 (8–6)	Hart Center (1,876); Worcester, MA
Feb 15; 7:00 pm, SE2		Navy	W 74–55	15–11 (9–6)	Stabler Arena (1,007); Bethlehem, PA
Feb 18; 2:00 pm		at Lafayette	W 81–55	16–11 (10–6)	Kirby Sports Center (2,177); Easton, PA
Feb 22; 7:00 pm, SE2		Colgate	W 87–69	17–11 (11–6)	Stabler Arena (1,091); Bethlehem, PA
Feb 25; 7:30 pm, SE2		Army	W 83–69	18–11 (12–6)	Stabler Arena (2,036); Bethlehem, PA
Patriot League tournament
Mar 2; 7:00 pm	(3)	(6) Colgate; Quarterfinals	W 77–72	19–11	Stabler Arena (1,609); Bethlehem, PA
Mar 5; 12:00 pm, CBSSN	(3)	at (2) Boston University; Semifinals	W 91–88 ^{2OT}	20–11	Case Gym (511); Boston, MA
Mar 8; 7:30 pm, CBSSN	(3)	at (1) Bucknell; Championship game	L 65–81	20–12	Sojka Pavilion (4,254); Lewisburg, PA
*Non-conference game. ^{#}Rankings from AP Poll. (#) Tournament seedings in parentheses. All times are in Eastern Time. Sources
