= 2016–17 Boston University Terriers men's basketball team =

American college basketball season

2016–17 Boston University Terriers men's basketball
- Conference: Patriot League
- Record: 18–14 (12–6 Patriot)
- Head coach: Joe Jones (6th season)
- Assistant coaches: Shaun Morris; Curtis Wilson; Walt Corbean
- Home arena: Case Gym

2016–17 Patriot League men's basketball standings
	Conf.				Overall
Team	W		L	PCT	W		L	PCT
Bucknell †	15	–	3	.833	26	–	9	.743
Lehigh	12	–	6	.667	20	–	12	.625
Boston University	12	–	6	.667	18	–	14	.563
Navy	10	–	8	.556	16	–	16	.500
Holy Cross	9	–	9	.500	15	–	17	.469
Loyola (MD)	8	–	10	.444	16	–	17	.485
Colgate	8	–	10	.444	10	–	22	.313
Army	6	–	12	.333	13	–	19	.406
Lafayette	5	–	13	.278	9	–	21	.300
American	5	–	13	.278	8	–	22	.267
† 2017 Patriot League tournament winner

The 2016–17 Boston University Terriers men's basketball team represented Boston University during the 2016–17 NCAA Division I men's basketball season. The Terriers, led by sixth-year head coach Joe Jones, played their home games at Case Gym as members of the Patriot League. They finished the season 18–14, 12–16 in America East play to finish in a tie for second place. As the No. 2 seed in the Patriot League tournament, they defeated Loyola (MD) in the quarterfinals before losing to Lehigh in double overtime in the semifinals.

== Previous season ==
The Terriers finished the 2015–16 season 19–15, 11–7 in Patriot League play to finish in third place. They lost in the quarterfinals of the Patriot League tournament to American. They were invited to the CollegeInsider.com Tournament where they defeated Fordham in the first round before losing in the second round to NJIT.

== Offseason ==
=== Departures ===
Name	Number	Pos.	Height	Weight	Year	Hometown	Notes
John Papale	2	G	6'3"	190	Senior	Wallingford, CT	Graduated
Braiten Madrigal	14	F	6'4"	180	Junior	Downey, CA	Walk-on; left the team due to personal resasons
Nathan Dieudonne	22	F	6'7"	225	Senior	Louisville, KY	Graduated

=== 2016 recruiting class ===
College recruiting information
Name	Hometown	School	Height	Weight	Commit date
Tyler Scanlon #83 PF	Chantilly, VA	Westfield High School	6 ft 7 in (2.01 m)	210 lb (95 kg)	Sep 17, 2015
Tyler Scanlon #83 PF	Recruit ratings: Scout: Rivals: (66)				
Max Mahoney #95 PF	Basking Ridge, NJ	Ridge High School	6 ft 7 in (2.01 m)	200 lb (91 kg)	Sep 30, 2015
Max Mahoney #95 PF	Recruit ratings: Scout: Rivals: (63)				
Destin Barnes; SG	Crown Point, IN	Don Bosco Prep	6 ft 6 in (1.98 m)	200 lb (91 kg)	
Destin Barnes; SG	Recruit ratings: Scout: Rivals: (NR)				
Overall recruit ranking:
Note: In many cases, Scout, Rivals, 247Sports, On3, and ESPN may conflict in their listings of height and weight.; In these cases, the average was taken. ESPN grades are on a 100-point scale.; Sources: "2016 Team Ranking". Rivals.

=== 2017 recruiting class ===
College recruiting information (2017)
Name	Hometown	School	Height	Weight	Commit date
Sukhmail Mathon; PF	Dallas, PA	Holderness School	6 ft 9 in (2.06 m)	220 lb (100 kg)	Aug 8, 2016
Sukhmail Mathon; PF	Recruit ratings: Scout: Rivals: (NR)				
Overall recruit ranking:
Note: In many cases, Scout, Rivals, 247Sports, On3, and ESPN may conflict in their listings of height and weight.; In these cases, the average was taken. ESPN grades are on a 100-point scale.; Sources: "2017 Team Ranking". Rivals.

== Roster ==
2016–17 Boston University Terriers men's basketball team
Players
Coaches

Pos.	#	Name	Height	Weight	Year	Previous school	Hometown
G	0	Eric Johnson	6 ft 2 in (1.88 m)	195 lb (88 kg)	Jr	Carlisle School	Durham, North Carolina
F	1	Nick Havener	6 ft 8 in (2.03 m)	225 lb (102 kg)	Jr	Riverview High School	Sarasota, Florida
F	2	Tyler Scanlon	6 ft 7 in (2.01 m)	215 lb (98 kg)	Fr	Westfield High School	Chantilly, Virginia
G	3	Eric Fanning	6 ft 5 in (1.96 m)	215 lb (98 kg)	RS Sr	Wagner	Trenton, New Jersey
C	5	Blaise Mbargorba	7 ft 0 in (2.13 m)	225 lb (102 kg)	RS Sr	Peddie School	Garoua, Cameroon
G	13	Will Goff	6 ft 3 in (1.91 m)	190 lb (86 kg)	Jr	Desert Mountain High School	Scottsdale, Arizona
G	15	Cheddi Mosely	6 ft 3 in (1.91 m)	195 lb (88 kg)	Jr	St. Anthony High School	Jersey City, New Jersey
G	20	Cameron Curry (W)	5 ft 10 in (1.78 m)	175 lb (79 kg)	Sr	Chino Hills High School	West Covina, California
G	21	Cedric Hankerson (C)	6 ft 5 in (1.96 m)	225 lb (102 kg)	Jr	Coral Reef Senior High School	Miami, Florida
G	23	Destin Barnes	6 ft 6 in (1.98 m)	210 lb (95 kg)	Fr	Don Bosco Preparatory High School	Chicago, Illinois
G	24	Kamali Chambers (W)	5 ft 11 in (1.8 m)	180 lb (82 kg)	So	Brewster Academy	Golden Valley, Minnesota
G	25	Kyle Foreman	6 ft 1 in (1.85 m)	170 lb (77 kg)	So	Bellevue High School	Clyde Hill, Washington
F	32	Justin Alston (C)	6 ft 8 in (2.03 m)	230 lb (104 kg)	Sr	Archbishop Carroll High School	Washington, D.C.
G	34	Brandon Johnson (W)	6 ft 4 in (1.93 m)	210 lb (95 kg)	So	Loomis Chaffee School	Mount Vernon, New York
F	41	Dylan Haines	7 ft 0 in (2.13 m)	240 lb (109 kg)	Sr	St. Thomas More School (CT)	Liverpool, New York
F	51	Max Mahoney	6 ft 8 in (2.03 m)	235 lb (107 kg)	Fr	Ridge High School	Basking Ridge, New Jersey

Head coach

- Joe Jones (SUNY–Oswego)

Assistant coach(es)

- Shaun Morris (Lycoming)
- Curtis Wilson (Adelphi)
- Walt Corbean (Northern Kentucky)

Legend

- (C) Team captain
- (S) Suspended
- (I) Ineligible
- (W) Walk-on
- Injured
- Current redshirt

Roster

== Schedule and results ==
Date time, TV	Rank^{#}	Opponent^{#}	Result	Record	Site (attendance) city, state
Non-conference regular season
11/11/2016*; 7:00 pm		at Northeastern	L 77–87	0–1	Matthews Arena (2,287); Boston, MA
11/18/2016*; 6:00 pm		Northeastern; Steve Wright Classic	W 65–63	1–1	Case Gym (843); Boston, MA
11/19/2016*; 4:00 pm		Maine; Steve Wright Classic	W 102–78	2–1	Case Gym (672); Boston, MA
11/20/2016*; 4:30 pm		LIU Brooklyn; Steve Wright Classic	W 86–69	3–1	Case Gym (460); Boston, MA
11/22/2016*; 12:00 pm		Western New England	W 91–54	4–1	Case Gym (955); Boston, MA
11/28/2016*; 7:00 pm		at Saint Peter's	L 67–80	4–2	Yanitelli Center; Jersey City, NJ
11/30/2016*; 7:00 pm, ESPN3/SNY		at UConn	L 49–51	4–3	XL Center (8,183); Hartford, CT
12/03/2016*; 4:30 pm, RSN		at NC State	L 73–77	4–4	PNC Arena (15,986); Raleigh, NC
12/07/2016*; 7:30 pm		Canisius	L 77–87	4–5	Case Gym (363); Boston, MA
12/10/2016*; 12:00 pm, RSN		at Syracuse	L 77–99	4–6	Carrier Dome (22,878); Syracuse, NY
12/18/2016*; 1:00 pm		New Hampshire	W 73–69	5–6	Case Gym (321); Boston, MA
12/21/2016*; 7:00 pm		at UMass Lowell	L 75–77	5–7	Tsongas Center (717); Lowell, MA
Patriot League regular season
12/30/2016; 7:00 pm		Holy Cross	W 61–55	6–7 (1–0)	Case Gym (632); Boston, MA
01/02/2017; 2:00 pm		Lehigh	W 75–61	7–7 (2–0)	Case Gym (484); Boston, MA
01/05/2017; 7:00 pm		at Navy	W 71–53	8–7 (3–0)	Alumni Hall; Annapolis, MD
01/08/2017; 2:00 pm		at Lafayette	W 91–75	9–7 (4–0)	Kirby Sports Center (1,477); Easton, PA
01/11/2017; 7:00 pm		American	W 76–66	10–7 (5–0)	Case Gym (298); Boston, MA
01/16/2017; 7:00 pm, CBSSN		at Loyola (MD)	L 69–77	10–8 (5–1)	Reitz Arena (1,286); Baltimore, MD
01/18/2017; 7:00 pm		Colgate	L 58–67	10–9 (5–2)	Case Gym (480); Boston, MA
01/21/2017; 2:00 pm, ASN		at Bucknell	L 59–70	10–10 (5–3)	Sojka Pavilion (3,265); Lewisburg, PA
01/25/2017; 7:00 pm		Army	W 90–89 ^{OT}	11–10 (6–3)	Case Gym (740); Boston, MA
01/30/2017; 7:00 pm, CBSSN		at Lehigh	W 76–59	12–10 (7–3)	Stabler Arena (1,302); Bethlehem, PA
02/02/2017; 7:00 pm		Navy	L 61–70	12–11 (7–4)	Case Gym (646); Boston, MA
02/05/2017; 12:00 pm		Lafayette	W 75–58	13–11 (8–4)	Case Gym (526); Boston, MA
02/08/2017; 7:30 pm		at American	W 67–64	14–11 (9–4)	Bender Arena (1,014); Washington, D.C.
02/11/2017; 12:00 pm, ASN		Loyola (MD)	W 78–63	15–11 (10–4)	Case Gym (521); Boston, MA
02/15/2017; 7:00 pm		at Colgate	W 69–68	16–11 (11–4)	Cotterell Court (947); Hamilton, NY
02/19/2017; 12:00 pm		Bucknell	L 66–86	16–12 (11–5)	Case Gym (940); Boston, MA
02/22/2017; 7:00 pm		at Army	L 62–73	16–13 (11–6)	Christl Arena (1,103); West Point, NY
02/25/2017; 12:00 pm		at Holy Cross	W 71–68 ^{OT}	17–13 (12–6)	Hart Center (3,548); Worcester, MA
Patriot League tournament
03/02/2017; 7:00 pm	(2)	(7) Loyola (MD); Quarterfinals	W 64–60	18–13	Case Gym (510); Boston, MA
03/05/2017; 12:00 pm, CBSSN	(2)	(3) Lehigh; Semifinals	L 88–91 ^{2OT}	18–14	Case Gym (511); Boston, MA
*Non-conference game. ^{#}Rankings from AP Poll. (#) Tournament seedings in parentheses. All times are in Eastern Time Source.
