= 2016–17 Colgate Raiders men's basketball team =

American college basketball season

2016–17 Colgate Raiders men's basketball
- Conference: Patriot League
- Record: 10–22 (8–10 Patriot)
- Head coach: Matt Langel (6th season)
- Assistant coaches: Dave Klatsky; Michael McGarvey; Michael-Hakim Jordan
- Home arena: Cotterell Court

2016–17 Patriot League men's basketball standings
	Conf.				Overall
Team	W		L	PCT	W		L	PCT
Bucknell †	15	–	3	.833	26	–	9	.743
Lehigh	12	–	6	.667	20	–	12	.625
Boston University	12	–	6	.667	18	–	14	.563
Navy	10	–	8	.556	16	–	16	.500
Holy Cross	9	–	9	.500	15	–	17	.469
Loyola (MD)	8	–	10	.444	16	–	17	.485
Colgate	8	–	10	.444	10	–	22	.313
Army	6	–	12	.333	13	–	19	.406
Lafayette	5	–	13	.278	9	–	21	.300
American	5	–	13	.278	8	–	22	.267
† 2017 Patriot League tournament winner

The 2016–17 Colgate Raiders men's basketball team represented Colgate University during the 2016–17 NCAA Division I men's basketball season. The Raiders, led by sixth-year head coach Matt Langel, played their home games at Cotterell Court in Hamilton, New York as members of the Patriot League. They finished the season 10–22, 8–10 in Patriot League play to finish in a tie for sixth place. As the No. 6 seed in the Patriot League tournament, they lost in the quarterfinals to Lehigh.

== Previous season ==
The Raiders finished the 2015–16 season 13–17, 9–9 in Patriot League play to finish in four-way tie for fourth place. They lost in the quarterfinals of the Patriot League tournament to Army.

== Departures ==
Name	Number	Pos.	Height	Weight	Year	Hometown	Notes
Austin Tillotson	1	G	6'0"	175	Senior	York, PA	Graduated
Alex Ramon	10	G	6'1"	196	Senior	Vitoria-Gasteiz, Spain	Graduated

== Incoming recruits ==
College recruiting information
Name	Hometown	School	Height	Weight	Commit date
Will Rayman #92 PF	New York, NY	New Hampton School	6 ft 7 in (2.01 m)	190 lb (86 kg)	Jun 29, 2015
Will Rayman #92 PF	Recruit ratings: Scout: Rivals: (60)				
Overall recruit ranking:
Note: In many cases, Scout, Rivals, 247Sports, On3, and ESPN may conflict in their listings of height and weight.; In these cases, the average was taken. ESPN grades are on a 100-point scale.; Sources: "2016 Team Ranking". Rivals.

=== 2017 class recruits ===
College recruiting information (2017)
Name	Hometown	School	Height	Weight	Commit date
Jordan Burns; PG	San Antonio, TX	John Marshall High School	5 ft 11 in (1.80 m)	N/A	Oct 20, 2015
Jordan Burns; PG	Recruit ratings: Scout: Rivals: (NR)				
Overall recruit ranking:
Note: In many cases, Scout, Rivals, 247Sports, On3, and ESPN may conflict in their listings of height and weight.; In these cases, the average was taken. ESPN grades are on a 100-point scale.; Sources: "2017 Team Ranking". Rivals.

== Roster ==
2016–17 Colgate Raiders men's basketball team
Players
Coaches

Pos.	#	Name	Height	Weight	Year	Previous school	Hometown
G	0	Sean O'Brien	6 ft 2 in (1.88 m)	188 lb (85 kg)	Jr	Penn Charter	Lafayette Hill, PA
G	1	Gabe Alter (W)	6 ft 3 in (1.91 m)	185 lb (84 kg)	Fr	Germantown Academy	Fort Washington, PA
G	2	Nathan Harries	6 ft 2 in (1.88 m)	180 lb (82 kg)	Sr	Centennial	Alpharetta, PA
G	3	David Favorite	6 ft 3 in (1.91 m)	200 lb (91 kg)	So	Alamo Heights	San Antonio, TX
F	4	Sam Lindgren (W)	6 ft 6 in (1.98 m)	210 lb (95 kg)	So	Germantown Academy	Doylestown, PA
F/C	5	Malcolm Regisford	6 ft 8 in (2.03 m)	220 lb (100 kg)	So	Bellarmine-Jefferson	Woodland Hills, CA
F	10	Will Rayman	6 ft 8 in (2.03 m)	200 lb (91 kg)	Fr	Millbrook	New York, NY
C	12	Dana Batt	6 ft 9 in (2.06 m)	215 lb (98 kg)	So	Homestead	Fort Wayne, IN
G	13	Andrew Bargmann (W, C)	6 ft 3 in (1.91 m)	180 lb (82 kg)	Sr	Malvern Prep	Downingtown, PA
F	14	Tom Rivard	6 ft 7 in (2.01 m)	200 lb (91 kg)	So	Worcester Academy	Worcester, MA
F	15	Jordan Swopshire	6 ft 6 in (1.98 m)	210 lb (95 kg)	Jr	Fort Zumwalt South	O'Fallon, MO
G	21	Ryan Diew (W)	6 ft 2 in (1.88 m)	180 lb (82 kg)	Sr	Head-Royce	Oakland, CA
F	22	Dave Krmpotich	6 ft 7 in (2.01 m)	180 lb (82 kg)	So	La Salle	Conshohocken, PA
G	23	Milan Williams	6 ft 3 in (1.91 m)	210 lb (95 kg)	Fr	Detroit Country Day	Detroit, MI
G	25	Jordan Robertson	6 ft 3 in (1.91 m)	185 lb (84 kg)	Jr	Wildwood Catholic	Cape May Court House, NJ
G	30	Francisco Amiel	6 ft 2 in (1.88 m)	172 lb (78 kg)	So	Escola Secundaria Professor Ruy Luis Gomes	Corroios, Portugal
G	42	Jack Buckmelter (W)	6 ft 1 in (1.85 m)	175 lb (79 kg)	Fr	East	Denver, CO
G	45	Dylan Whitbread (W)	6 ft 3 in (1.91 m)	—	Fr	King Edward VII School	Johannesburg, South Africa

Head coach

- Matt Langel (Penn)

Assistant coach(es)

- Dave Klatsky (Penn)
- Mike McGarvey (Ursinus)
- Mike Jordan (Penn)

Legend

- (C) Team captain
- (S) Suspended
- (I) Ineligible
- (W) Walk-on
- Injured
- Current redshirt

Roster

== Schedule and results ==
Date time, TV	Rank^{#}	Opponent^{#}	Result	Record	Site (attendance) city, state
Non-conference regular season
11/11/2016*; 7:00 pm, ACCN Extra		at No. 19 Syracuse	L 55–83	0–1	Carrier Dome (23,844); Syracuse, NY
11/16/2016*; 7:00 pm		at Cornell	W 67–63	1–1	Newman Arena (1,328); Ithaca, NY
11/19/2016*; 4:00 pm		at NJIT	L 68–74	1–2	Fleisher Center (802); Newark, NJ
11/23/2016*; 7:00 pm, BTN		at Penn State	L 59–72	1–3	Bryce Jordan Center (5,112); University Park, PA
11/26/2016*; 2:00 pm		at Columbia	L 78–81 ^{OT}	1–4	Levien Gymnasium (1,148); New York City, NY
11/29/2016*; 7:00 pm		Union (NY); Holy City Hoops Classic	W 91–68	2–4	Cotterell Court (331); Hamilton, NY
12/02/2016*; 5:00 pm		at The Citadel; Holy City Hoops Classic	L 101–108	2–5	McAlister Field House (356); Charleston, SC
12/03/2016*; 5:00 pm		vs. Campbell; Holy City Hoops Classic	L 71–73 ^{OT}	2–6	McAlister Field House (276); Charleston, SC
12/04/2016*; 1:00 pm		vs. USC Upstate; Holy City Hoops Classic	L 65–71	2–7	McAlister Field House (212); Charleston, SC
12/07/2016*; 7:00 pm		Binghamton	L 64–73	2–8	Cotterell Court (630); Hamilton, NY
12/10/2016*; 2:00 pm		Albany	L 66–74	2–9	Cotterell Court (740); Hamilton, NY
12/19/2016*; 7:00 pm, ACCN Extra		at No. 25 Notre Dame	L 62–77	2–10	Edmund P. Joyce Center (6,817); South Bend, IN
12/22/2016*; 2:00 pm		at Duquesne	L 57–70	2–11	Palumbo Center (1,082); Pittsburgh, PA
Patriot League regular season
12/30/2016; 7:00 pm		at Lafayette	W 85–75	3–11 (1–0)	Kirby Sports Center (1,942); Easton, PA
01/02/2017; 7:00 pm		American	L 64–67 ^{OT}	3–12 (1–1)	Cotterell Court (766); Hamilton, NY
01/05/2017; 7:00 pm		Holy Cross	L 61–67	3–13 (1–2)	Cotterell Court (728); Hamilton, NY
01/08/2017; 2:00 pm		at Navy	L 55–67	3–14 (1–3)	Alumni Hall (1,158); Annapolis, MD
01/11/2017; 7:00 pm		at Army	W 79–76 ^{OT}	4–14 (2–3)	Christl Arena (514); West Point, NY
01/14/2017; 2:00 pm		Bucknell	L 69–83	4–15 (2–4)	Cotterell Court (840); Hamilton, NY
01/18/2017; 7:00 pm		at Boston University	W 67–58	5–15 (3–4)	Case Gym (480); Boston, MA
01/21/2017; 2:00 pm		Loyola (MD)	W 52–49	6–15 (4–4)	Cotterell Court (825); Hamilton, NY
01/25/2017; 7:00 pm		Lehigh	L 62–76	6–16 (4–5)	Cotterell Court (834); Hamilton, NY
01/29/2017; 2:00 pm, CBSSN		at American	W 70–65	7–16 (5–5)	Bender Arena (913); Washington, D.C.
02/01/2017; 7:00 pm		at Holy Cross	L 50–56	7–17 (5–6)	Hart Center (1,401); Worcester, MA
02/04/2017; 2:00 pm		Navy	W 55–52	8–17 (6–6)	Cotterell Court (985); Hamilton, NY
02/08/2017; 7:00 pm		Army	W 70–58	9–17 (7–6)	Cotterell Court (764); Hamilton, NY
02/13/2017; 7:00 pm, CBSSN		at Bucknell	L 58–75	9–18 (7–7)	Sojka Pavilion (2,008); Lewisburg, PA
02/15/2017; 7:00 pm		Boston University	L 68–69	9–19 (7–8)	Cotterell Court (947); Hamilton, NY
02/19/2017; 2:00 pm		at Loyola (MD)	W 66–56 ^{OT}	10–19 (8–8)	Reitz Arena (621); Baltimore, MD
02/22/2017; 7:00 pm		at Lehigh	L 69–87	10–20 (8–9)	Stabler Arena (1,091); Bethlehem, PA
02/25/2017; 2:00 pm		Lafayette	L 69–73	10–21 (8–10)	Cotterell Court (1,057); Hamilton, NY
Patriot League tournament
03/02/2017; 7:00 pm	(6)	at (3) Lehigh; Quarterfinals	L 72–77	10–22	Stabler Arena (1,609); Bethlehem, PA
*Non-conference game. ^{#}Rankings from AP Poll. (#) Tournament seedings in parentheses. All times are in Eastern Time Source.
