= 2016–17 Loyola Greyhounds men's basketball team =

American college basketball season

2016–17 Loyola Greyhounds men's basketball

CBI, Quarterfinals
- Conference: Patriot League
- Record: 16–17 (8–10 Patriot)
- Head coach: G. G. Smith (4th season)
- Assistant coaches: Keith Booth; Josh Loeffler; Trevor Quinn
- Home arena: Reitz Arena

2016–17 Patriot League men's basketball standings
	Conf.				Overall
Team	W		L	PCT	W		L	PCT
Bucknell †	15	–	3	.833	26	–	9	.743
Lehigh	12	–	6	.667	20	–	12	.625
Boston University	12	–	6	.667	18	–	14	.563
Navy	10	–	8	.556	16	–	16	.500
Holy Cross	9	–	9	.500	15	–	17	.469
Loyola (MD)	8	–	10	.444	16	–	17	.485
Colgate	8	–	10	.444	10	–	22	.313
Army	6	–	12	.333	13	–	19	.406
Lafayette	5	–	13	.278	9	–	21	.300
American	5	–	13	.278	8	–	22	.267
† 2017 Patriot League tournament winner

The 2016–17 Loyola Greyhounds men's basketball team represented Loyola University Maryland during the 2016–17 NCAA Division I men's basketball season. The Greyhounds, led by fourth-year head coach G. G. Smith, played their home games at Reitz Arena in Baltimore, Maryland as members of the Patriot League. They finished the season 16–17, 8–10 in Patriot League play to finish in a tie for sixth place with Colgate. As the No. 7 seed in the Patriot League tournament, they defeated Lafayette in the first round before losing in the quarterfinals to Boston University. They received an invitation to the College Basketball Invitational where they defeated George Mason in the first round before losing in the quarterfinals to Coastal Carolina.

== Previous season ==
The Greyhounds finished the 2015–16 season 9–21, 8–10 in Patriot League play to finish in eighth place. They lost in the first round of the Patriot League tournament to Holy Cross.

== Offseason ==
=== Departures ===
Name	Number	Pos.	Height	Weight	Year	Hometown	Notes
Eric Laster	5	G	6'6"	191	Senior	Smyrna, DE	Graduated
Sean Tuohy, Jr.	11	G	6'0"	186	Senior	Memphis, TN	Graduate transferred to SMU
Franz Rassman	13	F	6'10"	230	Senior	Washington, D.C.	Graduated
Tyler Hubbard	23	G	6'2"	179	Senior	Washington, D.C.	Graduated
Josh Forney	42	F	6'9"	264	RS Junior	Baltimore, MD	Transferred

=== 2016 recruiting class ===
College recruiting information
Name	Hometown	School	Height	Weight	Commit date
Kavaughn Scott #83 PF	Orange, CA	Orange Lutheran High School	6 ft 7 in (2.01 m)	220 lb (100 kg)	
Kavaughn Scott #83 PF	Recruit ratings: Scout: Rivals: (66)				
Chuck Champion #86 SG	Philadelphia, PA	Friends' Central School	6 ft 2 in (1.88 m)	N/A	
Chuck Champion #86 SG	Recruit ratings: Scout: Rivals: (61)				
Austin Harriott #109 SF	Philadelphia, PA	The Hun School Of Princeton	6 ft 4 in (1.93 m)	175 lb (79 kg)	Aug 8, 2015
Austin Harriott #109 SF	Recruit ratings: Scout: Rivals: (60)				
Andrew Kostecka #116 SF	Germantown, MD	Clarksburg High School	6 ft 4 in (1.93 m)	N/A	
Andrew Kostecka #116 SF	Recruit ratings: Scout: Rivals: (59)				
Dylan Gollihar; C	Richardson, TX	Richardson High School	7 ft 0 in (2.13 m)	N/A	Sep 26, 2015
Dylan Gollihar; C	Recruit ratings: Scout: Rivals: (NR)				
Ian Langendoerfer; SF	Honesdale, PA	Honesdale High School	6 ft 5 in (1.96 m)	N/A	Nov 10, 2015
Ian Langendoerfer; SF	Recruit ratings: Scout: Rivals: (NR)				
Overall recruit ranking:
Note: In many cases, Scout, Rivals, 247Sports, On3, and ESPN may conflict in their listings of height and weight.; In these cases, the average was taken. ESPN grades are on a 100-point scale.; Sources: "2016 Team Ranking". Rivals.

== Roster ==
2016–17 Loyola Greyhounds men's basketball team
Players
Coaches

Pos.	#	Name	Height	Weight	Year	Previous school	Hometown
C	0	Dylan Gollihar	7 ft 0 in (2.13 m)	204 lb (93 kg)	Fr	Richardson	Richardson, TX
F	1	Nick Gorski	6 ft 9 in (2.06 m)	242 lb (110 kg)	Sr	Benedictine Prep	Richmond, VA
G	2	Andre Walker	6 ft 0 in (1.83 m)	170 lb (77 kg)	Jr	Christ the King	Westbury, NY
G	4	Nevell Provo	6 ft 0 in (1.83 m)	186 lb (84 kg)	So	Pine Ridge	North Breston, NS
F	5	KaVaughn Scott	6 ft 8 in (2.03 m)	220 lb (100 kg)	Fr	Orange Lutheran	Irvine, CA
G	10	Andrew Kostecka III	6 ft 4 in (1.93 m)	179 lb (81 kg)	Fr	Clarksburg	Germantown, MD
G	12	Austin Harriott	6 ft 4 in (1.93 m)	213 lb (97 kg)	Fr	The Hun School of Princeton	Philadelphia, PA
G	14	Chuck Champion	6 ft 3 in (1.91 m)	175 lb (79 kg)	Fr	Friends Central	Philadelphia, PA
G	15	Sam Norton (W)	6 ft 2 in (1.88 m)	180 lb (82 kg)	So	The Hill School	Collegeville, PA
G	20	Matt Staubi	5 ft 8 in (1.73 m)	152 lb (69 kg)	Jr	Darien	Rye, NY
F	21	Jarred Jones	6 ft 6 in (1.98 m)	205 lb (93 kg)	RS Sr	John Carroll	Havre de Grace, MD
F	22	Cam Gregory	6 ft 8 in (2.03 m)	214 lb (97 kg)	Jr	St. Stephens and St. Agnes	Waldorf, MD
G	25	James Fives	6 ft 6 in (1.98 m)	196 lb (89 kg)	So	The Hill School	Scranton, PA
F	35	Chancellor Barnard	6 ft 4 in (1.93 m)	187 lb (85 kg)	Jr	Glenelg Country Day	Columbia, MD
G	41	Ian Langendoerfer	6 ft 5 in (1.96 m)	211 lb (96 kg)	Fr	Honesdale	Honesdale, PA

Head coach

- G.G. Smith (Georgia)

Assistant coach(es)

- Keith Booth (Maryland)
- Josh Loeffler (Swarthmore)
- Trevor Quinn (Goucher)

Legend

- (C) Team captain
- (S) Suspended
- (I) Ineligible
- (W) Walk-on
- Injured
- Current redshirt

Roster

== Schedule and results ==
Date time, TV	Rank^{#}	Opponent^{#}	Result	Record	Site (attendance) city, state
Exhibition
11/03/2016*; 7:30 pm		Johns Hopkins	W 73–50		Reitz Arena; Baltimore, MD
Non-conference regular season
11/11/2016*; 7:00 pm		at Duquesne	L 60–65	0–1	Palumbo Center (1,319); Pittsburgh, PA
11/14/2016*; 7:30 pm		Millersville	W 79–66	1–1	Reitz Arena (814); Baltimore, MD
11/16/2016*; 7:00 pm		at LIU Brooklyn	L 61–65	1–2	Barclays Center (762); Brooklyn, NY
11/18/2016*; 7:00 pm, ACCN Extra		at Notre Dame	L 48–83	1–3	Edmund P. Joyce Center (8,894); South Bend, IN
11/23/2016*; 1:00 pm		Fairfield	W 81–66	2–3	Reitz Arena (367); Baltimore, MD
11/26/2016*; 3:30 pm, FS2		at No. 12 Creighton	L 52–82	2–4	CenturyLink Center (16,907); Omaha, NE
11/30/2016*; 7:00 pm, ESPN3		at Stony Brook	W 71–70	3–4	Island Federal Credit Union Arena (2,387); Stony Brook, NY
12/03/2016*; 4:00 pm, MASN		Mount St. Mary's	W 64–57	4–4	Reitz Arena (1,478); Baltimore, MD
12/07/2016*; 7:00 pm		at Towson	L 53–70	4–5	SECU Arena (1,214); Towson, MD
12/10/2016*; 2:00 pm, ESPN3		at Binghamton	W 90–85 ^{OT}	5–5	Binghamton University Events Center (4,037); Vestal, NY
12/23/2016*; 1:00 pm		UMass Lowell	W 69–60	6–5	Reitz Arena (628); Baltimore, MD
Patriot League regular season
12/30/2016; 7:30 pm		at American	W 68–66	7–5 (1–0)	Bender Arena (523); Washington, D.C.
01/02/2017; 7:30 pm		Lafayette	L 69–78	7–6 (1–1)	Reitz Arena (418); Baltimore, MD
01/05/2017; 7:00 pm		at Lehigh	W 84–83	8–6 (2–1)	Stabler Arena (832); Beltlehem, PA
01/08/2017; 1:00 pm		at Army	L 57–66	8–7 (2–2)	Christl Arena (751); West Point, NY
01/11/2017; 7:30 pm		Navy	L 62–75	8–8 (2–3)	Reitz Arena (592); Baltimore, MD
01/16/2017; 7:00 pm, CBSSN		Boston University	W 77–69	9–8 (3–3)	Reitz Arena (1,286); Baltimore, MD
01/18/2017; 7:00 pm		at Bucknell	L 63–76	9–9 (3–4)	Sojka Pavilion (2,268); Lewisburg, PA
01/21/2017; 2:00 pm		at Colgate	L 49–52	9–10 (3–5)	Cotterell Court (825); Hamilton, NY
01/25/2017; 7:30 pm		Holy Cross	W 65–62	10–10 (4–5)	Reitz Arena (872); Baltimore, MD
01/28/2017; 2:00 pm		at Lafayette	W 70–62	11–10 (5–5)	Kirby Sports Center (1,377); Easton, PA
02/01/2017; 7:30 pm		Lehigh	W 62–60	12–10 (6–5)	Reitz Arena (623); Baltimore, MD
02/04/2017; 2:00 pm		Army	W 78–63	13–10 (7–5)	Reitz Arena (1,042); Baltimore, MD
02/08/2017; 7:00 pm		at Navy	L 59–62	13–11 (7–6)	Alumni Hall (1,435); Annapolis, MD
02/11/2017; 12:00 pm, ASN		at Boston University	L 63–78	13–12 (7–7)	Case Gym (521); Boston, MA
02/15/2017; 7:30 pm		Bucknell	W 78–77	14–12 (8–7)	Reitz Arena (1,071); Baltimore, MD
02/19/2017; 12:00 pm		Colgate	L 56–66 ^{OT}	14–13 (8–8)	Reitz Arena (621); Baltimore, MD
02/22/2017; 7:00 pm		at Holy Cross	L 62–63	14–14 (8–9)	Hart Center (1,497); Worcester, MA
02/25/2017; 12:00 pm		American	L 62–64	14–15 (8–10)	Reitz Arena (786); Baltimore, MD
Patriot League tournament
02/28/2017; 7:00 pm	(7)	(10) Lafayette; First round	W 67–64	15–15	Reitz Arena (472); Baltimore, MD
03/02/2017; 7:00 pm	(7)	at (2) Boston University; Quarterfinals	L 60–64	15–16	Case Gym (510); Boston, MA
CBI
03/15/2017*; 7:00 pm		at George Mason; First Round	W 73–58	16–16	EagleBank Arena (1,400); Fairfax, VA
03/20/2017*; 7:00 pm		at Coastal Carolina; Quarterfinals	L 63–72	16–17	HTC Center; Conway, SC
*Non-conference game. ^{#}Rankings from AP Poll. (#) Tournament seedings in parentheses. All times are in Eastern Time Source.
