= 2016–17 Bucknell Bison men's basketball team =

American college basketball season

2016–17 Bucknell Bison men's basketball

Patriot League tournament champions Patriot League regular season champions

NCAA tournament, First Round
- Conference: Patriot League
- Record: 26–9 (15–3 Patriot)
- Head coach: Nathan Davis (2nd season)
- Assistant coaches: Paul Harrison; John Griffin; Joe Meehan
- Home arena: Sojka Pavilion

2016–17 Patriot League men's basketball standings
	Conf.				Overall
Team	W		L	PCT	W		L	PCT
Bucknell †	15	–	3	.833	26	–	9	.743
Lehigh	12	–	6	.667	20	–	12	.625
Boston University	12	–	6	.667	18	–	14	.563
Navy	10	–	8	.556	16	–	16	.500
Holy Cross	9	–	9	.500	15	–	17	.469
Loyola (MD)	8	–	10	.444	16	–	17	.485
Colgate	8	–	10	.444	10	–	22	.313
Army	6	–	12	.333	13	–	19	.406
Lafayette	5	–	13	.278	9	–	21	.300
American	5	–	13	.278	8	–	22	.267
† 2017 Patriot League tournament winner

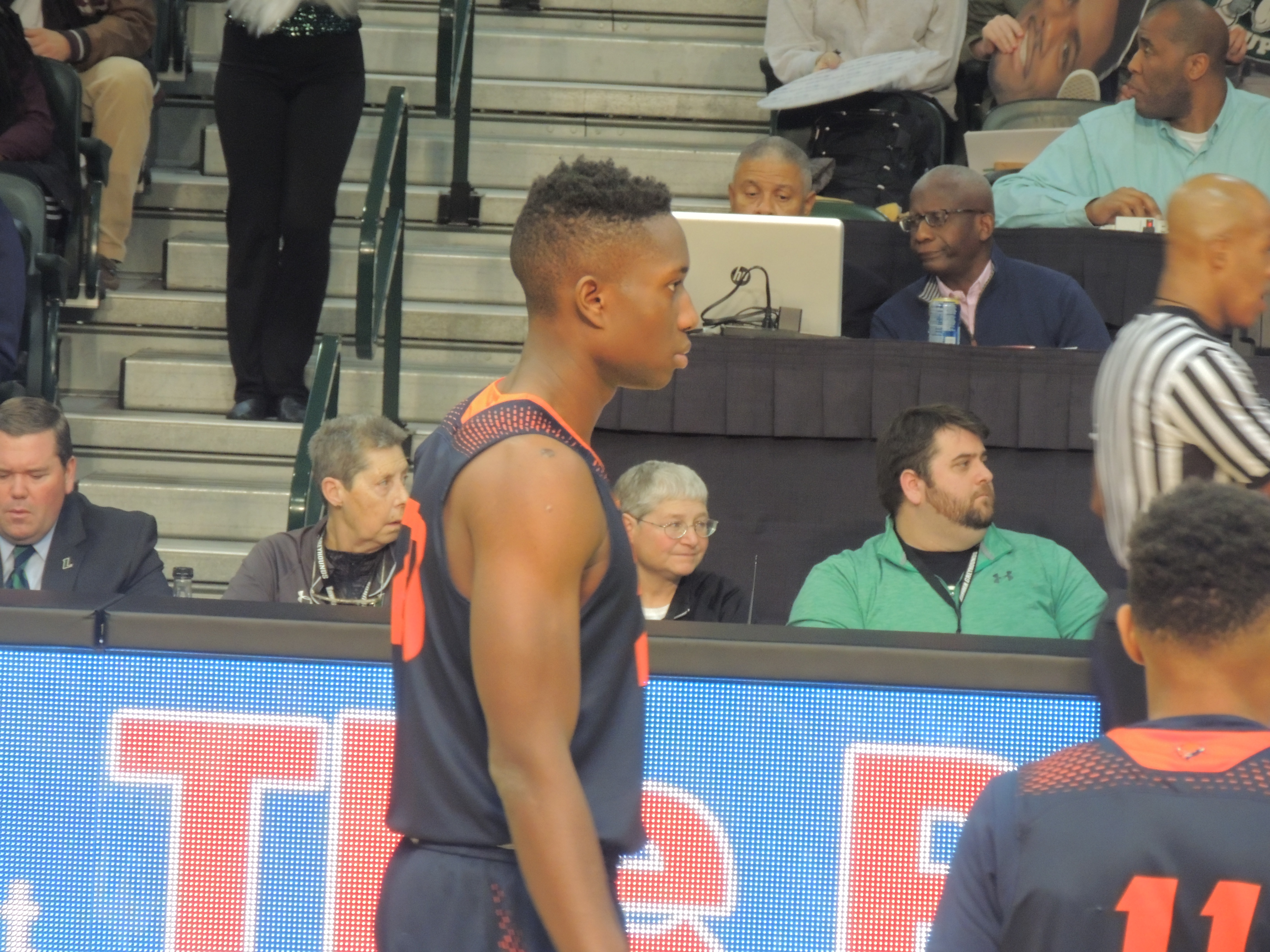
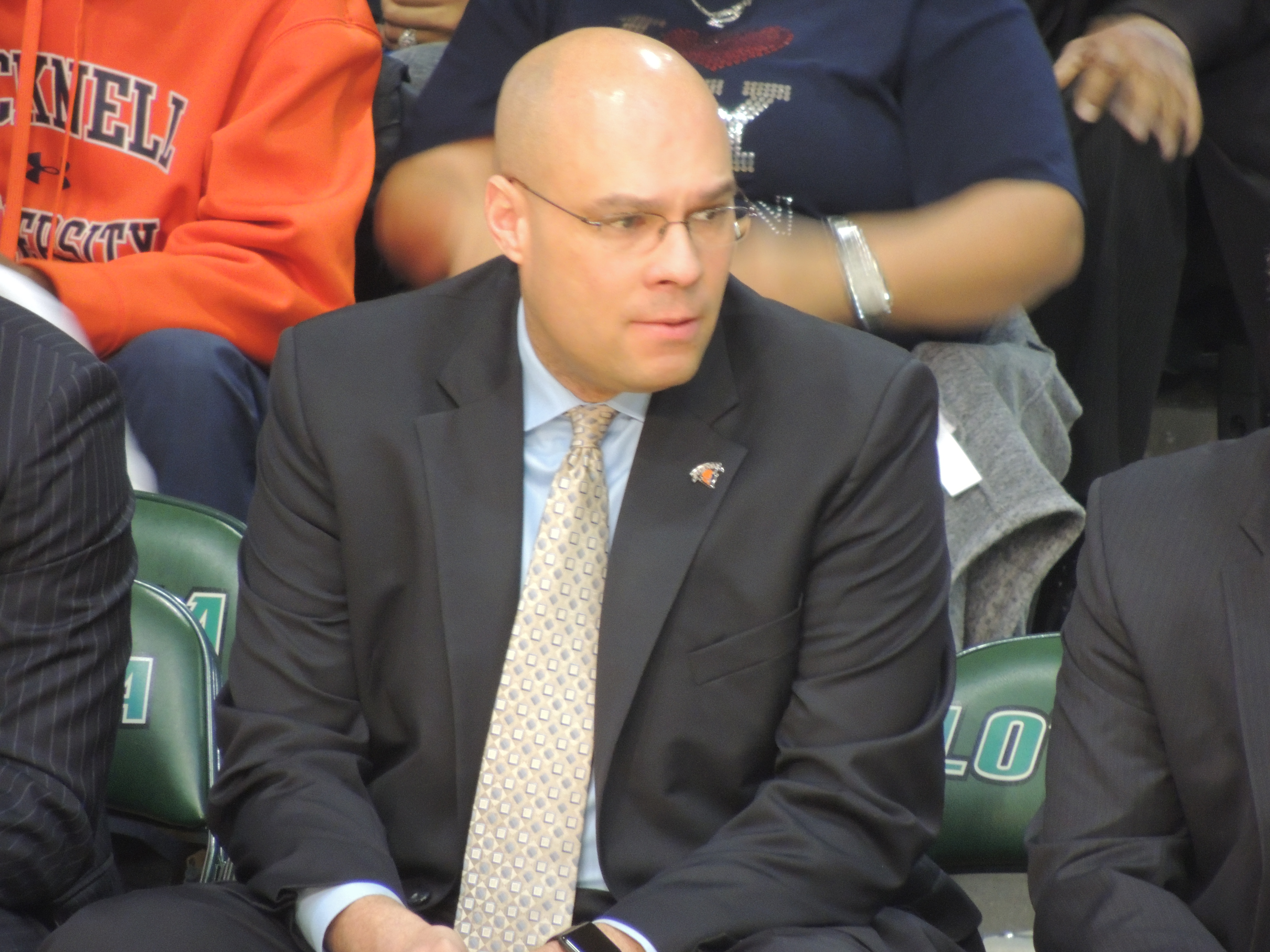
The Bison swept the Patriot League individual awards, with Nana Foulland winning Player of the Year and Defensive Player of the Year, and Nathan Davis winning Coach of the Year.

The 2016–17 Bucknell Bison men's basketball team represented Bucknell University during the 2016–17 NCAA Division I men's basketball season. The Bison, led by second-year head coach Nathan Davis, played their home games at Sojka Pavilion in Lewisburg, Pennsylvania as members of the Patriot League. They finished the regular season 23–8, 15–3 in Patriot League play to win the regular season championship, their third straight title and sixth in seven years. As the No. 1 seed in the Patriot League tournament, they defeated Army, Navy, and Lehigh to win the tournament championship. As a result, the Bison received the conference's automatic bid to the NCAA tournament as the No. 13 seed in the West region. There, they lost in the first round to West Virginia.

== Previous season ==
The Bison finished the 2015–16 season 17–14, 14–4 in Patriot League play to win the regular season championship for the second consecutive year. They lost in the quarterfinals of the Patriot League tournament to Holy Cross. As a regular season champion who failed to win their league tournament, they received an automatic bid to the National Invitation Tournament, where they lost in the first round to Monmouth.

== Offseason ==
=== Departures ===
Name	Number	Pos.	Height	Weight	Year	Hometown	Reason for departure
Chris Hass	14	G	6'5"	184	Senior	Pellston, MI	Graduated
Matt Banas	25	F	6'9"	205	Senior	Hershey, PA	Graduated
Ryan Frazier	32	G	6'0"	190	Senior	Silver Springs, MD	Graduated
Dom Hoffman	50	F	6'7"	222	Senior	Hawthorne, NJ	Graduated

=== 2016 recruiting class ===
College recruiting
Name	Hometown	School	Height	Weight	Commit date
Bruce Moore #77 PF	Randallstown, MD	McDonough High School	6 ft 7 in (2.01 m)	N/A	Sep 15, 2015
Bruce Moore #77 PF	Recruit ratings: Scout: Rivals: (66)				
Ben Robertson; SF	High Point, NC	High Point Christian Academy	6 ft 5 in (1.96 m)	190 lb (86 kg)	Sep 14, 2015
Ben Robertson; SF	Recruit ratings: Scout: Rivals: (NR)				
Avi Toomer; SG	Atlanta, GA	Grady High School	6 ft 2 in (1.88 m)	185 lb (84 kg)	Oct 8, 2015
Avi Toomer; SG	Recruit ratings: Scout: Rivals: (NR)				
Overall recruit ranking:
Note: In many cases, Scout, Rivals, 247Sports, On3, and ESPN may conflict in their listings of height and weight.; In these cases, the average was taken. ESPN grades are on a 100-point scale.; Sources: "2016 Team Ranking". Rivals.

== Roster ==
2016–17 Bucknell Bison men's basketball team
Players
Coaches

Pos.	#	Name	Height	Weight	Year	Previous school	Hometown
F	0	D.J. MacLeay	6 ft 7 in (2.01 m)	235 lb (107 kg)	Sr	Ronald Reagan High School	San Antonio, Texas
G	1	Kimbal Mackenzie	6 ft 1 in (1.85 m)	190 lb (86 kg)	So	The John Carroll School	Oakville, Ontario, Canada
G	2	Stephen Brown	5 ft 11 in (1.8 m)	165 lb (75 kg)	Jr	Christ Chapel Academy	Manassas, Virginia
F/C	4	Nate Sestina	6 ft 8 in (2.03 m)	234 lb (106 kg)	So	Cameron County High School	Emporium, Pennsylvania
G	5	John Azzinaro	5 ft 11 in (1.8 m)	180 lb (82 kg)	Sr	William J. Brennan High School	San Antonio, Texas
G	11	Avi Toomer	6 ft 3 in (1.91 m)	187 lb (85 kg)	Fr	Henry W. Grady High School	Atlanta, Georgia
F	13	Bruce Moore	6 ft 8 in (2.03 m)	210 lb (95 kg)	Fr	McDonogh School	Owings Mills, Maryland
G	14	Ben Robertson	6 ft 5 in (1.96 m)	193 lb (88 kg)	Fr	High Point Christian Academy	High Point, North Carolina
G	15	Nate Jones	6 ft 4 in (1.93 m)	205 lb (93 kg)	So	Radford High School	Radford, Virginia
C	20	Nana Foulland	6 ft 9 in (2.06 m)	230 lb (104 kg)	Jr	Berks Catholic High School	Reading, Pennsylvania
G	22	Matt O'Reilley	6 ft 3 in (1.91 m)	200 lb (91 kg)	So	Prolific Prep Academy	Moraga, California
F	23	Zach Thomas	6 ft 7 in (2.01 m)	228 lb (103 kg)	Jr	Oakdale High School	Ijamsville, Maryland
C	44	Ben Oberfeld	6 ft 9 in (2.06 m)	247 lb (112 kg)	Sr	Eastview High School	Eagan, Minnesota

Head coach

- Nathan Davis (Randolph–Macon)

Assistant coach(es)

- Paul Harrison (Washington and Lee)
- John Griffin (Bucknell)
- Joe Meehan (Lebanon Valley)

Legend

- (C) Team captain
- (S) Suspended
- (I) Ineligible
- (W) Walk-on
- Injured
- Current redshirt

Roster

== Schedule and results ==
Date time, TV	Rank^{#}	Opponent^{#}	Result	Record	Site (attendance) city, state
Non-conference regular season
11/11/2016*; 7:00 pm		Manhattan	W 76–64	1–0	Sojka Pavilion (2,763); Lewisburg, PA
11/13/2016*; 2:00 pm, ACCN Extra		at Wake Forest	L 74–94	1–1	LJVM Coliseum (6,541); Winston-Salem, NC
11/16/2016*; 7:00 pm		Robert Morris	W 75–62	2–1	Sojka Pavilion (2,205); Lewisburg, PA
11/19/2016*; 1:00 pm, FSN		at Butler; Las Vegas Classic	L 60–86	2–2	Hinkle Fieldhouse (7,236); Indianapolis, IN
11/21/2016*; 9:00 pm, SECN		at Vanderbilt; Las Vegas Classic	W 75–72	3–2	Memorial Gymnasium (8,243); Nashville, TN
11/24/2016*; 2:30 pm		vs. Norfolk State; Las Vegas Classic semifinals	W 84–58	4–2	Orleans Arena; Paradise, NV
11/25/2016*; 5:00 pm		vs. Northern Colorado; Las Vegas Classic	W 75–63	5–2	Orleans Arena (520); Paradise, NV
11/30/2016*; 7:00 pm		Richmond	W 73–68	6–2	Sojka Pavilion (2,494); Lewisburg, PA
12/03/2016*; 2:00 pm		at La Salle	L 73–83	6–3	Tom Gola Arena (1,732); Philadelphia, PA
12/06/2016*; 7:00 pm, SNY/ESPN3		at Fairfield	W 75–64	7–3	Webster Bank Arena (1,403); Bridgeport, CT
12/17/2016*; 12:00 pm, ESPN3		vs. Siena	L 68–71	7–4	Glens Falls Civic Center (3,490); Glens Falls, NY
12/19/2016*; 7:00 pm		Mount St. Mary's	W 81–65	8–4	Sojka Pavilion (1,952); Lewisburg, PA
12/22/2016*; 7:00 pm		Princeton	L 70–72	8–5	Sojka Pavilion (3,216); Lewisburg, PA
Patriot League regular season
12/30/2016; 7:00 pm		at Navy	W 59–55	9–5 (1–0)	Alumni Hall (2,301); Annapolis, MD
01/02/2017; 7:00 pm		Army	W 84–76	10–5 (2–0)	Sojka Pavilion (1,737); Lewisburg, PA
01/05/2017; 7:30 pm		at American	W 69–60	11–5 (3–0)	Bender Arena (512); Washington, D.C.
01/08/2017; 1:00 pm		at Holy Cross	W 68–49	12–5 (4–0)	Hart Center (1,503); Worcester, MA
01/11/2017; 7:00 pm		Lehigh	L 71–82	12–6 (4–1)	Sojka Pavilion (2,254); Lewisburg, PA
01/14/2017; 2:00 pm		at Colgate	W 83–69	13–6 (5–1)	Cotterell Court (840); Hamilton, NY
01/18/2017; 7:00 pm		at Loyola (MD)	W 76–63	14–6 (6–1)	Reitz Arena (2,268); Baltimore, MD
01/21/2017; 2:00 pm, ASN		Boston University	W 70–59	15–6 (7–1)	Sojka Pavilion (3,265); Lewisburg, PA
01/25/2017; 7:00 pm		at Lafayette	W 78–55	16–6 (8–1)	Kirby Sports Center (1,549); Easton, PA
01/28/2017; 3:00 pm		at Army	W 96–75	17–6 (9–1)	Christl Arena (1,808); West Point, NY
02/01/2017; 7:00 pm		American	W 80–60	18–6 (10–1)	Sojka Pavilion (1,939); Lewisburg, PA
02/06/2017; 7:00 pm, CBSSN		Holy Cross	W 82–68	19–6 (11–1)	Sojka Pavilion (2,615); Lewisburg, PA
02/08/2017; 7:00 pm		at Lehigh	L 71–79	19–7 (11–2)	Stabler Arena (1,241); Bethlehem, PA
02/13/2017; 7:00 pm, CBSSN		Colgate	W 75–58	20–7 (12–2)	Sojka Pavilion (2,008); Lewisburg, PA
02/15/2017; 7:30 pm		Loyola (MD)	L 77–78	20–8 (12–3)	Sojka Pavilion (1,071); Lewisburg, PA
02/18/2017; 12:00 pm, CBSSN		at Boston University	W 86–66	21–8 (13–3)	Case Gym (940); Boston, MA
02/22/2017; 7:00 pm		Lafayette	W 94–64	22–8 (14–3)	Sojka Pavilion (1,593); Lewisburg, PA
02/25/2017; 12:00 pm, CBSSN		Navy	W 82–60	23–8 (15–3)	Sojka Pavilion (3,551); Lewisburg, PA
Patriot League tournament
03/02/2017; 7:00 pm	(1)	(8) Army; Quarterfinals	W 78–62	24–8	Sojka Pavilion (2,151); Lewisburg, PA
03/05/2017; 2:00 pm, CBSSN	(1)	(4) Navy; Semifinals	W 70–65	25–8	Sojka Pavilion (2,731); Lewisburg, PA
03/08/2017; 7:30 pm, CBSSN	(1)	(3) Lehigh; Championship	W 81–65	26–8	Sojka Pavilion (4,254); Lewisburg, PA
NCAA tournament
03/16/2017*; 2:45 pm, CBS	(13 W)	vs. (4 W) No. 13 West Virginia; First Round	L 80–86	26–9	KeyBank Center (17,806); Buffalo, NY
*Non-conference game. ^{#}Rankings from AP Poll. (#) Tournament seedings in parentheses. W=West Region. All times are in Eastern Time. Source

== See also ==
- List of Bucknell Bison men's basketball seasons
