= 2016–17 Army Black Knights men's basketball team =

American college basketball season

2016–17 Army Black Knights men's basketball
- Conference: Patriot League
- Record: 13–19 (6–12 Patriot)
- Head coach: Jimmy Allen (1st season)
- Assistant coaches: Brandon Linton; Drew Adams; Ben Wilkins; Zak Boisvert
- Home arena: Christl Arena

2016–17 Patriot League men's basketball standings
| | Conf. | | | | Overall |
| Team | W | | L | PCT | W | | L | PCT |
|---|---|---|---|---|---|---|---|---|
| Bucknell † | 15 | – | 3 | .833 | 26 | – | 9 | .743 |
| Lehigh | 12 | – | 6 | .667 | 20 | – | 12 | .625 |
| Boston University | 12 | – | 6 | .667 | 18 | – | 14 | .563 |
| Navy | 10 | – | 8 | .556 | 16 | – | 16 | .500 |
| Holy Cross | 9 | – | 9 | .500 | 15 | – | 17 | .469 |
| Loyola (MD) | 8 | – | 10 | .444 | 16 | – | 17 | .485 |
| Colgate | 8 | – | 10 | .444 | 10 | – | 22 | .313 |
| Army | 6 | – | 12 | .333 | 13 | – | 19 | .406 |
| Lafayette | 5 | – | 13 | .278 | 9 | – | 21 | .300 |
| American | 5 | – | 13 | .278 | 8 | – | 22 | .267 |
† 2017 Patriot League tournament winner

The 2016–17 Army Black Knights men's basketball team represented the United States Military Academy during the 2016–17 NCAA Division I men's basketball season. The Black Knights, led by first-year head coach Jimmy Allen, played their home games at Christl Arena in West Point, New York as members of the Patriot League. They finished the season 13–19, 6–12 in Patriot League play to finish in eighth place. As the No. 8 seed in the Patriot League tournament, they defeated American in the first round before losing to top-seeded Bucknell in the quarterfinals.

== Previous season ==
The Black Knights finished the 2015–16 season 19–14, 9–9 in Patriot League play to finish in a four-way tie for fourth place. They defeated Colgate in the quarterfinals of the Patriot League tournament to advance to the semifinals where they lost to Holy Cross. They were invited to the CollegeInsider.com Tournament, where they lost in the first round to NJIT.

On March 25, 2016, Zach Spiker resigned as head coach to accept the head coaching position at Drexel. He finished with a seven-year record of 102–112. On April 6, the school hired Jimmy Allen as head coach.

== Offseason ==
=== Departures ===
| Name | Number | Pos. | Height | Weight | Year | Hometown | Notes |
|---|---|---|---|---|---|---|---|
| Maxwell Lenox | 0 | G | 6'0" | 200 | Senior | Fairfax, VA | Graduated |
| Dylan Cox | 11 | G | 6'4" | 190 | Senior | Cedar Park, TX | Graduated |
| Kyle Wilson | 21 | G/F | 6'4" | 205 | Senior | Mission Viejo, CA | Graduated |
| Kevin Ferguson | 31 | C | 6'10" | 200 | Senior | Berkeley Heights, NJ | Graduated |
| Tanner Plomb | 32 | F | 6'7" | 205 | Senior | Mukonago, WI | Graduated |
| Larry Toomey | 33 | F | 6'6" | 209 | Senior | St. Louis, MO | Graduated |
| Nathan Dodge | 35 | G | 6'2" | 205 | Sophomore | East Troy, WI | Transferred to UW–Stevens Point |
| Austin Williamson | 40 | F/C | 6'8" | 224 | Junior | Naples, FL | No longer on team roster |
| Travis Rollo | 43 | F/C | 6'7" | 205 | Senior | Mayer, MN | Graduated |

=== 2016 recruiting class ===
College recruiting
| Name | Hometown | School | Height | Weight | Commit date |
|---|---|---|---|---|---|
| Babacar Thiombane #86 PF | Los Angeles, CA | Fairfax High School | 6 ft 7 in (2.01 m) | 180 lb (82 kg) | |
| Babacar Thiombane #86 PF | Recruit ratings: Scout: Rivals: (65) | | | | |
| Cameron Fuller #125 PF | Newhall, CA | William S. Hart High School | 6 ft 8 in (2.03 m) | 185 lb (84 kg) | Dec 12, 2015 |
| Cameron Fuller #125 PF | Recruit ratings: Scout: Rivals: (58) | | | | |
| Tommy Funk #106 PG | Warminster, PA | Archbishop Wood High School | 6 ft 0 in (1.83 m) | 165 lb (75 kg) | Aug 10, 2015 |
| Tommy Funk #106 PG | Recruit ratings: Scout: Rivals: (58) | | | | |
| Mike Janowski #116 PG | Arlington, VA | St. Stephen's & St. Agnes School | 6 ft 3 in (1.91 m) | N/A | |
| Mike Janowski #116 PG | Recruit ratings: Scout: Rivals: (57) | | | | |
| Tucker Blackwell; SG | Bloomington, IN | Bloomington South High School | 6 ft 1 in (1.85 m) | N/A | |
| Tucker Blackwell; SG | Recruit ratings: Scout: Rivals: (NR) | | | | |
| Spencer Schultz; SG | Clear Spring, MD | Clear Spring High School | 6 ft 6 in (1.98 m) | 170 lb (77 kg) | |
| Spencer Schultz; SG | Recruit ratings: Scout: Rivals: (NR) | | | | |
| Nick Finke; PF | Champaign, IL | Champaign Central High School | 6 ft 7 in (2.01 m) | N/A | Nov 9, 2015 |
| Nick Finke; PF | Recruit ratings: Scout: Rivals: (NR) | | | | |
Overall recruit ranking:
Note: In many cases, Scout, Rivals, 247Sports, On3, and ESPN may conflict in their listings of height and weight.; In these cases, the average was taken. ESPN grades are on a 100-point scale.; Sources: "2016 Team Ranking". Rivals.

=== 2017 recruiting class ===
College recruiting (2017)
| Name | Hometown | School | Height | Weight | Commit date |
|---|---|---|---|---|---|
| Josh Caldwell; PG | Columbia, SC | Heathwood Hall Episcopal School | 6 ft 1 in (1.85 m) | N/A | Jul 26, 2016 |
| Josh Caldwell; PG | Recruit ratings: Scout: Rivals: (NR) | | | | |
| John Scully; PG | Flower Mound, TX | Flower Mound Episcopal School | 6 ft 2 in (1.88 m) | N/A | Aug 13, 2016 |
| John Scully; PG | Recruit ratings: Scout: Rivals: (NR) | | | | |
Overall recruit ranking:
Note: In many cases, Scout, Rivals, 247Sports, On3, and ESPN may conflict in their listings of height and weight.; In these cases, the average was taken. ESPN grades are on a 100-point scale.; Sources: "2017 Team Ranking". Rivals.

== Roster ==
2016–17 Army Black Knights men's basketball team
Players
Coaches

| Pos. | # | Name | Height | Weight | Year | Previous school | Hometown |
|---|---|---|---|---|---|---|---|
| G | 1 | Richard Brown | 6 ft 6 in (1.98 m) | 214 lb (97 kg) | Sr | Davidson Day School | Charlotte, NC |
| G | 2 | Cayne Edwards | 6 ft 4 in (1.93 m) | 220 lb (100 kg) | So | Samuel Clemens | Schertz, TX |
| G | 3 | Scott Mammel | 5 ft 11 in (1.8 m) | 178 lb (81 kg) | Sr | Winston Churchill | San Antonio, TX |
| F | 4 | Daniel Andrews | 6 ft 7 in (2.01 m) | 205 lb (93 kg) | So | Punahou School | Honolulu, HI |
| G | 5 | Ben Mammel | 6 ft 0 in (1.83 m) | 183 lb (83 kg) | So | Winston Churchill | San Antonio, TX |
| F | 10 | Kennedy Edwards | 6 ft 6 in (1.98 m) | 215 lb (98 kg) | Sr | Notre Dame | Northridge, CA |
| G | 11 | Tommy Funk | 6 ft 0 in (1.83 m) | 181 lb (82 kg) | Fr | Archbishop Wood | Warrington, PA |
| G | 12 | Spencer Schultz | 6 ft 3 in (1.91 m) | 191 lb (87 kg) | Fr | Clear Spring | Clear Spring, MD |
| F/C | 14 | Matthew Wilson | 6 ft 9 in (2.06 m) | 235 lb (107 kg) | Fr | Campbell County | Alexandria, KY |
| G/F | 15 | Jacob Kessler | 6 ft 4 in (1.93 m) | 190 lb (86 kg) | So | Mills E. Godwin | Richmond, VA |
| F | 20 | Mac Hoffman | 6 ft 8 in (2.03 m) | 213 lb (97 kg) | Sr | De La Salle | Pleasanton, CA |
| G | 21 | Will Culliton | 6 ft 2 in (1.88 m) | 177 lb (80 kg) | Fr | Breck School | Pleasanton, CA |
| F | 23 | Gunther Klines | 6 ft 6 in (1.98 m) | 200 lb (91 kg) | Fr | Bellevue | Medina, WA |
| G | 24 | Jason Houle | 6 ft 5 in (1.96 m) | 207 lb (94 kg) | So | Father Gabriel Richard | Plymouth, MI |
| F | 25 | Luke Morrison | 6 ft 6 in (1.98 m) | 218 lb (99 kg) | Jr | Northside Christian Academy | Charlotte, NC |
| G | 30 | Jordan Fox | 6 ft 1 in (1.85 m) | 184 lb (83 kg) | So | Jackson County | Jackson County, KY |
| F | 32 | Vincent McFadden | 6 ft 8 in (2.03 m) | 197 lb (89 kg) | Fr | San Juan Hills | San Juan Capistrano, CA |
| C | 34 | John Miller | 6 ft 9 in (2.06 m) | 225 lb (102 kg) | So | New Albany | New Albany, NY |
| F | 43 | Keeston Smith | 6 ft 5 in (1.96 m) | 168 lb (76 kg) | Fr | La Salle Catholic College Prep | Oregon City, OR |
| F | 44 | Mark Pollack | 6 ft 6 in (1.98 m) | 218 lb (99 kg) | Jr | Charlotte Catholic | Charlotte, NC |
| F | 45 | Adam Roe | 6 ft 5 in (1.96 m) | 210 lb (95 kg) | So | West Platte | Weston, MO |
| F | 51 | Parker Fennema | 6 ft 6 in (1.98 m) | 215 lb (98 kg) | So | Sanderson | Raleigh, NC |
| G/F | 52 | John Emezie | 6 ft 6 in (1.98 m) | 215 lb (98 kg) | So | Marvin Ridge | Waxhaw, NC |
| G | 53 | Lance Lawson | 6 ft 2 in (1.88 m) | 169 lb (77 kg) | Fr | Ardrey Kell | Charlotte, NC |
| F | 54 | Bryce Samuel | 6 ft 6 in (1.98 m) | 183 lb (83 kg) | Fr | Barack Obama Male Leadership Academy | Cedar Hill, TX |
| G | 55 | Kevin Olsen Jr. | 6 ft 0 in (1.83 m) | 168 lb (76 kg) | Fr | Villa Park | Villa Park, CA |

Head coach

- Jimmy Allen (Emory & Henry)

Assistant coach(es)

- Brandon Linton (Clarkson)
- Drew Adams (Chicago)
- Ben Wilkins (NC State)
- Zak Boisvert (Fordham)

Legend

- (C) Team captain
- (S) Suspended
- (I) Ineligible
- (W) Walk-on
- Injured
- Current redshirt

Roster

== Schedule and results ==
| Date time, TV | Rank^{#} | Opponent^{#} | Result | Record | Site (attendance) city, state |
Non-conference regular season
| 11/11/2016*; 11:00 pm, P12N | | at No. 5 Oregon; Maui on the Mainland | L 77–91 | 0–1 | Matthew Knight Arena (12,364); Eugene, OR |
| 11/15/2016*; 7:00 pm | | Mount Saint Mary (NY) | W 91–53 | 1–1 | Christl Arena (747); West Point, NY |
| 11/19/2016*; 6:00 pm | | Arkansas State; Maui on the Mainland semifinals | L 57–60 | 1–2 | Christl Arena (921); West Point, NY |
| 11/20/2016*; 2:30 pm | | Central Arkansas; Maui on the Mainland 3rd place game | L 76–81 | 1–3 | Christl Arena (670); West Point, NY |
| 11/23/2016*; 7:00 pm | | at Columbia | W 88–83 | 2–3 | Levien Gymnasium (1,011); New York City, NY |
| 11/26/2016*; 2:00 pm | | at Fairfield | L 74–75 | 2–4 | Webster Bank Arena (1,083); Bridgeport, CT |
| 11/30/2016*; 7:00 pm | | Fairleigh Dickinson | W 98–78 | 3–4 | Christl Arena (446); West Point, NY |
| 12/03/2016*; 4:00 pm | | St. Francis Brooklyn | W 76–56 | 4–4 | Christl Arena (550); West Point, NY |
| 12/07/2016*; 7:00 pm | | Air Force | W 79–71 | 5–4 | Christl Arena (810); West Point, NY |
| 12/10/2016*; 7:00 pm, ESPN3 | | at Monmouth | L 71–81 | 5–5 | OceanFirst Bank Center (3,465); West Long Branch, NJ |
| 12/19/2016*; 7:00 pm | | at St. Bonaventure | L 83–92 | 5–6 | Reilly Center (3,254); Olean, NY |
| 12/21/2016*; 7:00 pm | | Binghamton | W 71–60 | 6–6 | Christl Arena (713); West Point, NY |
Patriot League regular season
| 12/30/2016; 7:00 pm | | Lehigh | L 59–66 | 6–7 (0–1) | Christl Arena (1,558); West Point, NY |
| 01/02/2017; 7:00 pm | | at Bucknell | L 76–84 | 6–8 (0–2) | Sojka Pavilion (1,737); Lewisburg, PA |
| 01/05/2017; 7:00 pm | | at Lafayette | L 74–79 | 6–9 (0–3) | Kirby Sports Center (1,541); Easton, PA |
| 01/08/2017; 1:00 pm | | Loyola (MD) | W 66–57 | 7–9 (1–3) | Christl Arena (751); West Point, NY |
| 01/11/2017; 7:00 pm | | Colgate | L 76–79 ^{OT} | 7–10 (1–4) | Christl Arena (514); West Point, NY |
| 01/14/2017; 2:00 pm | | at American | W 53–49 | 8–10 (2–4) | Bender Arena (714); Washington, D.C. |
| 01/18/2017; 7:00 pm | | Holy Cross | L 76–85 | 8–11 (2–5) | Christl Arena (725); West Point, NY |
| 01/21/2017; 1:30 pm, CBSSN | | Navy | L 80–96 ^{OT} | 8–12 (2–6) | Christl Arena (5,291); West Point, NY |
| 01/25/2017; 7:00 pm | | at Boston University | L 89–90 ^{OT} | 8–13 (2–7) | Case Gym (740); Boston, MA |
| 01/28/2017; 3:00 pm | | Bucknell | L 75–96 | 8–14 (2–8) | Christl Arena (1,808); West Point, NY |
| 02/01/2017; 7:00 pm | | Lafayette | W 80–73 | 9–14 (3–8) | Christl Arena (523); West Point, NY |
| 02/04/2017; 2:00 pm | | at Loyola (MD) | L 63–78 | 9–15 (3–9) | Reitz Arena (1,042); Baltimore, MD |
| 02/08/2017; 7:00 pm | | at Colgate | L 58–70 | 9–16 (3–10) | Cotterell Court (764); Hamilton, NY |
| 02/11/2017; 3:00 pm | | American | L 58–61 | 9–17 (3–11) | Christl Arena (1,057); West Point, NY |
| 02/15/2017; 7:00 pm | | at Holy Cross | W 52–47 | 10–17 (4–11) | Hart Center (1,453); Worcester, MA |
| 02/18/2017; 1:30 pm, CBSSN | | at Navy | W 71–68 | 11–17 (5–11) | Alumni Hall (5,710); Annapolis, MD |
| 02/22/2017; 7:00 pm | | Boston University | W 73–62 | 12–17 (6–11) | Christl Arena (1,103); West Point, NY |
| 02/25/2017; 7:30 pm | | at Lehigh | L 69–83 | 12–18 (6–12) | Stabler Arena (2,036); Bethlehem, NY |
Patriot League tournament
| 02/28/2017; 7:00 pm | (8) | (9) American; First round | W 74–58 | 13–18 | Christl Arena (263); West Point, NY |
| 03/02/2017; 7:00 pm | (8) | at (1) Bucknell; Quarterfinals | L 62–78 | 13–19 | Sojka Pavilion (2,151); Lewisburg, PA |
*Non-conference game. ^{#}Rankings from AP Poll. (#) Tournament seedings in parentheses. All times are in Eastern Time Source.
