= 2016–17 American Eagles men's basketball team =

American college basketball season

2016–17 American Eagles men's basketball
- Conference: Patriot League
- Record: 8–22 (5–13 Patriot)
- Head coach: Mike Brennan (4th season)
- Assistant coaches: Scott Greenman; Matt Wolff; Eddie Jackson
- Home arena: Bender Arena

2016–17 Patriot League men's basketball standings
	Conf.				Overall
Team	W		L	PCT	W		L	PCT
Bucknell †	15	–	3	.833	26	–	9	.743
Lehigh	12	–	6	.667	20	–	12	.625
Boston University	12	–	6	.667	18	–	14	.563
Navy	10	–	8	.556	16	–	16	.500
Holy Cross	9	–	9	.500	15	–	17	.469
Loyola (MD)	8	–	10	.444	16	–	17	.485
Colgate	8	–	10	.444	10	–	22	.313
Army	6	–	12	.333	13	–	19	.406
Lafayette	5	–	13	.278	9	–	21	.300
American	5	–	13	.278	8	–	22	.267
† 2017 Patriot League tournament winner

The 2016–17 American Eagles men's basketball team represented American University during the 2016–17 NCAA Division I men's basketball season. The Eagles, led by fourth-year head coach Mike Brennan, played their home games at Bender Arena in Washington, D.C. as members of the Patriot League. They finished the season 8–22, 5–13 in Patriot League play to finish in a tie for ninth place. As the No. 9 seed in the Patriot League tournament, they lost in the first round to Army.

== Previous season ==
The Eagles finished the 2015–16 season 12–19, 9–9 in Patriot League play to finish in a four-way tie for fourth place. They defeated Boston University in the quarterfinals of the Patriot League tournament to advance the semifinals where they lost to Lehigh.

== Offseason ==
=== Departures ===
Name	Number	Pos.	Height	Weight	Year	Hometown	Notes
Marko Vasic	5	F	6'5"	200	Senior	Belgrade, Serbia	Graduated
Jesse Reed	14	G	6'5"	185	Senior	Saltsburg, PA	Graduated
Gabe Brown	34	C	7'0"	230	Sophomore	Berlin, Germany	Transferred to Rockhurst
Paris Maragkos	42	F/C	6'9"	243	RS Junior	Marousi, Greece	Signed to play professionally in Greece with Olympiacos B.C.

=== Incoming transfers ===
Name	Number	Pos.	Height	Weight	Year	Hometown	Previous School
Larry Motuzis	5	G	6'6"	190	RS Sophomore	Darien, IL	Transferred from Saint Xavier. Motuzis will be eligible to play.
Matt Cimino	22	F	6'10"	212	Junior	Falmouth, ME	Transferred from George Washington. Under NCAA transfer rules, Cimino will have to sit out from the 2016–17 season. Will have two years of remaining eligibility.

=== 2016 recruiting class ===
College recruiting information
Name	Hometown	School	Height	Weight	Commit date
Mark Gasperini #65 C	Brookline, MA	Brimmer & May	6 ft 9 in (2.06 m)	N/A	Sep 22, 2015
Mark Gasperini #65 C	Recruit ratings: Scout: Rivals: (64)				
Sa'eed Nelson #82 PG	Pleasantville, NJ	Saint Augustine Prep	5 ft 11 in (1.80 m)	N/A	Oct 5, 2015
Sa'eed Nelson #82 PG	Recruit ratings: Scout: Rivals: (59)				
Overall recruit ranking:
Note: In many cases, Scout, Rivals, 247Sports, On3, and ESPN may conflict in their listings of height and weight.; In these cases, the average was taken. ESPN grades are on a 100-point scale.; Sources: "2016 Team Ranking". Rivals.

== Roster ==
2016–17 American Eagles men's basketball team
Players
Coaches

Pos.	#	Name	Height	Weight	Year	Previous school	Hometown
G	0	Sa'eed Nelson	6 ft 1 in (1.85 m)	175 lb (79 kg)	RS Fr	St. Augustine Prep	Pleasantville, NJ
G/F	2	Delante Jones	6 ft 5 in (1.96 m)	195 lb (88 kg)	So	Virginia Episcopal	Lynchburg, VA
G	3	James Washington	6 ft 1 in (1.85 m)	160 lb (73 kg)	So	Price	Norwalk, CA
G	4	Alex Paquin	6 ft 0 in (1.83 m)	198 lb (90 kg)	Jr	Champlain College Saint-Lambert	Montreal, QE
G	5	Laurynas Motuzis	6 ft 6 in (1.98 m)	200 lb (91 kg)	RS So	Hinsdale South; Saint Xavier	Darien, IL
F	12	Yilret Yiljep	6 ft 7 in (2.01 m)	235 lb (107 kg)	RS Jr	Westtown	Kaduna, Nigeria
F	13	Leon Tolksdorf	6 ft 8 in (2.03 m)	225 lb (102 kg)	RS Sr	Leibniz-Berschule Berlin Secondary; Connecticut	Berlin, Germany
G	14	Justin Perez (W)	6 ft 1 in (1.85 m)	155 lb (70 kg)	Fr	Gulliver Prep	Miami, FL
F	15	Lonnie Rivera	6 ft 6 in (1.98 m)	195 lb (88 kg)	So	Don Bosco Prep	Spring Valley, NY
G/F	20	Charlie Jones (W)	6 ft 4 in (1.93 m)	185 lb (84 kg)	Sr	Mount St. Joseph	Manchester, MD
G	21	Jalen Rhea	6 ft 2 in (1.88 m)	205 lb (93 kg)	Sr	New Albany	New Albany, OH
F	22	Matt Cimino (I) (redshirt)	6 ft 10 in (2.08 m)	212 lb (96 kg)	Jr	Worcester Academy; George Washington	Falmouth, ME
F/C	23	Mark Gasperini	6 ft 10 in (2.08 m)	250 lb (113 kg)	Fr	Brimmer and May	Moscow, Russia
G	25	Kevin Brown	5 ft 8 in (1.73 m)	160 lb (73 kg)	So	Montclair Kimberley Academy	West Orange, NJ
C	35	Andrija Matić	6 ft 10 in (2.08 m)	220 lb (100 kg)	So	German School of Belgrade	Belgrade, Serbia

Head coach

- Mike Brennan (Princeton)

Assistant coach(es)

- Scott Greenman (Princeton)
- Matt Wolff (Boston University)
- Eddie Jackson (Ohio State)

Legend

- (C) Team captain
- (S) Suspended
- (I) Ineligible
- (W) Walk-on
- Injured
- Current redshirt

Roster

== Schedule and results ==
Date time, TV	Rank^{#}	Opponent^{#}	Result	Record	Site (attendance) city, state
Non-conference regular season
11/11/2016*; 7:00 pm, BTN		at No. 25 Maryland	L 56–62	0–1	Xfinity Center (17,078); College Park, MD
11/14/2016*; 8:00 pm		at Texas A&M	L 53–76	0–2	Reed Arena (6,043); College Station, TX
11/17/2016*; 7:00 pm		at Akron	L 62–72	0–3	James A. Rhodes Arena (2,785); Akron, OH
11/22/2016*; 7:30 pm		Wagner	L 65–73	0–4	Bender Arena (488); Washington, D.C.
11/26/2016*; 2:00 pm		Saint Francis (PA)	L 62–69	0–5	Bender Arena (432); Washington, D.C.
11/29/2016*; 7:30 pm		Western Illinois	W 57–50	1–5	Bender Arena (686); Washington, D.C.
12/03/2016*; 7:00 pm		at Howard	L 54–71	1–6	Burr Gymnasium (1,389); Washington, D.C.
12/06/2016*; 7:30 pm		New Hampshire	L 70–80	1–7	Bender Arena (474); Washington, D.C.
12/10/2016*; 2:00 pm		Youngstown State	W 77–62	2–7	Bender Arena (1,143); Washington, D.C.
12/19/2016*; 12:00 pm		Maryland Eastern Shore	W 61–58	3–7	Bender Arena (418); Washington, D.C.
12/21/2016*; 6:30 pm, FS1		at No. 1 Villanova	L 48–90	3–8	The Pavilion (6,500); Villanova, PA
Patriot League regular season
12/30/2016; 7:30 pm		Loyola (MD)	L 66–68	3–9 (0–1)	Bender Arena (523); Washington, D.C.
01/02/2017; 7:00 pm		at Colgate	W 67–64 ^{OT}	4–9 (1–1)	Cotterell Court (766); Hamilton, NY
01/05/2017; 7:30 pm		Bucknell	L 60–69	4–10 (1–2)	Bender Arena (512); Washington, D.C.
01/08/2017; 2:00 pm		at Lehigh	L 73–79	4–11 (1–3)	Stabler Arena (937); Bethlehem, PA
01/11/2017; 7:00 pm		at Boston University	L 66–76	4–12 (1–4)	Case Gym (298); Boston, MA
01/14/2017; 2:00 pm		Army	L 49–53	4–13 (1–5)	Bender Arena (714); Washington, D.C.
01/18/2017; 7:30 pm		Lafayette	W 71–57	5–13 (2–5)	Bender Arena (857); Washington, D.C.
01/23/2017; 7:00 pm, CBSSN		at Holy Cross	L 55–63	5–14 (2–6)	Hart Center (1,744); Worcester, MA
01/25/2017; 7:30 pm		Navy	L 53–71	5–15 (2–7)	Bender Arena (757); Washington, D.C.
01/28/2017; 2:00 pm, CBSSN		Colgate	L 65–70	5–16 (2–8)	Bender Arena (913); Washington, D.C.
02/01/2017; 7:30 pm		at Bucknell	L 60–80	5–17 (2–9)	Sojka Pavilion (1,939); Lewisburg, PA
02/04/2017; 2:00 pm		Lehigh	L 55–70	5–18 (2–10)	Bender Arena (984); Washington, D.C.
02/08/2017; 7:30 pm		Boston University	L 64–67	5–19 (2–11)	Bender Arena (1,014); Washington, D.C.
02/11/2017; 2:00 pm		at Army	W 61–58	6–19 (3–11)	Christl Arena (1,057); West Point, NY
02/15/2017; 7:00 pm		at Lafayette	L 65–78	6–20 (3–12)	Kirby Sports Center (1,247); Easton, PA
02/19/2017; 2:00 pm		Holy Cross	L 54–69	6–21 (3–13)	Bender Arena; Washington, D.C.
02/22/2017; 7:00 pm		at Navy	W 74–58	7–21 (4–13)	Alumni Hall (2,666); Annapolis, MD
02/25/2017; 12:00 pm		at Loyola (MD)	W 64–62	8–21 (5–13)	Reitz Arena (786); Baltimore, MD
Patriot League tournament
02/28/2017; 7:00 pm	(9)	at (8) Army; First round	L 58–74	8–22	Christl Arena (263); West Point, NY
*Non-conference game. ^{#}Rankings from AP poll. (#) Tournament seedings in parentheses. All times are in Eastern Time Source.

== See also ==
2016–17 American Eagles women's basketball team
