= 2016–17 Holy Cross Crusaders men's basketball team =

American college basketball season

2016–17 Holy Cross Crusaders men's basketball
- Conference: Patriot League
- Record: 15–17 (9–9 Patriot)
- Head coach: Bill Carmody (2nd season)
- Assistant coaches: Joe Scott; Joe Kennedy; Freddie Owens
- Home arena: Hart Center

2016–17 Patriot League men's basketball standings
	Conf.				Overall
Team	W		L	PCT	W		L	PCT
Bucknell †	15	–	3	.833	26	–	9	.743
Lehigh	12	–	6	.667	20	–	12	.625
Boston University	12	–	6	.667	18	–	14	.563
Navy	10	–	8	.556	16	–	16	.500
Holy Cross	9	–	9	.500	15	–	17	.469
Loyola (MD)	8	–	10	.444	16	–	17	.485
Colgate	8	–	10	.444	10	–	22	.313
Army	6	–	12	.333	13	–	19	.406
Lafayette	5	–	13	.278	9	–	21	.300
American	5	–	13	.278	8	–	22	.267
† 2017 Patriot League tournament winner

The 2016–17 Holy Cross Crusaders men's basketball team represented the College of the Holy Cross during the 2016–17 NCAA Division I men's basketball season. The Crusaders, led by second-year head coach Bill Carmody, played their home games at the Hart Center in Worcester, Massachusetts as members of the Patriot League. They finished the season 15–17, 9–9 in Patriot League play to finish in fifth place. As the No. 5 seed in the Patriot League tournament, they lost in the quarterfinals to Navy.

== Previous season ==
The Crusaders finished the 2015–16 season 15–20, 5–13 in Patriot League play to finish in ninth place. As the No. 9 seed in the Patriot League tournament, they defeated Loyola (MD), Bucknell, Army, and Lehigh to win the Patriot League Tournament championship and earn the conference's automatic bid to the NCAA tournament. As a No. 16 seed in the Tournament, they defeated Southern in the First Four to advance to the First Round where they lost to Oregon.

== Offseason ==
=== Departures ===
Name	Number	Pos.	Height	Weight	Year	Hometown	Notes
Cullen Hamilton	5	G	6'2"	185	Senior	Washington, D.C.	Graduated
Christopher Morgan	12	F	6'7"	215	Senior	Gloucester, VA	Graduated
Eric Green	24	G/F	6'4"	191	Senior	Mountain House, CA	Graduated
Isaiah Baker	25	F	6'8"	240	Senior	Wyncote, PA	Graduated

=== 2016 recruiting class ===
College recruiting information
Name	Hometown	School	Height	Weight	Commit date
Tyrone Cohen; G	Jamaica, NY	Christ the King High School	6 ft 5 in (1.96 m)	186 lb (84 kg)	
Tyrone Cohen; G	Recruit ratings: Scout: Rivals: (NR)				
Clayton Le Sann; G	Geneva, Switzerland	Cheshire Academy	6 ft 4 in (1.93 m)	188 lb (85 kg)	
Clayton Le Sann; G	Recruit ratings: Scout: Rivals: (NR)				
Jack Stevens; C	Ithaca, NY	Kent School	6 ft 10 in (2.08 m)	240 lb (110 kg)	Aug 4, 2015
Jack Stevens; C	Recruit ratings: Scout: Rivals: (63)				
Overall recruit ranking:
Note: In many cases, Scout, Rivals, 247Sports, On3, and ESPN may conflict in their listings of height and weight.; In these cases, the average was taken. ESPN grades are on a 100-point scale.; Sources: "2015 Team Ranking". Rivals.

== Roster ==
2016–17 Holy Cross Crusaders men's basketball team
Players
Coaches

Pos.	#	Name	Height	Weight	Year	Previous school	Hometown
F	1	Karl Charles	6 ft 6 in (1.98 m)	200 lb (91 kg)	So	Rutgers Prep	Piscataway, New Jersey
G	2	Anthony Thompson	5 ft 10 in (1.78 m)	150 lb (68 kg)	Sr	Bullis	Glenn Dale, Maryland
G	4	Thomas Kennedy	6 ft 2 in (1.88 m)	175 lb (79 kg)	Sr	Northport	East Northport, New York
G	5	Patrick Rielly	6 ft 0 in (1.83 m)	175 lb (79 kg)	Sr	Cardinal Wuerl North Catholic High School	Pittsburgh, Pennsylvania
G	10	Pat Benzan	5 ft 11 in (1.8 m)	170 lb (77 kg)	So	Roxbury Latin	Wellesley, Massachusetts
G	12	Clayton Le Sann	6 ft 4 in (1.93 m)	188 lb (85 kg)	Fr	Cheshire Academy	Geneva, Switzerland
G/F	14	Marcellis Perkins	6 ft 4 in (1.93 m)	185 lb (84 kg)	So	Deep Creek	Chesapeake, Virginia
G	15	Tyrone Cohen	6 ft 5 in (1.96 m)	186 lb (84 kg)	Fr	Christ the King	Jamaica, New York
F	20	Jehyve Floyd	6 ft 7 in (2.01 m)	212 lb (96 kg)	So	Sayreville War Memorial	Sayreville, New Jersey
F	21	Malachi Alexander	6 ft 7 in (2.01 m)	217 lb (98 kg)	Sr	Eleanor Roosevelt	Bowie, Maryland
F	22	Robert Champion	6 ft 6 in (1.98 m)	203 lb (92 kg)	Sr	Charlotte Christian	Charlotte, North Carolina
F	30	Riley Criswell	6 ft 8 in (2.03 m)	205 lb (93 kg)	Sr	Carrollton	Carrollton, Georgia
G	31	Matt Zignorski	6 ft 2 in (1.88 m)	170 lb (77 kg)	So	Pope John XXIII	Sparta, New Jersey
C	33	Jack Stevens	6 ft 10 in (2.08 m)	240 lb (109 kg)	Fr	Kent School	Ithaca, New York
F	40	Derek Mountain	6 ft 5 in (1.96 m)	215 lb (98 kg)	So	Haverford School	Bryn Mawr, Pennsylvania
C	42	Matt Husek	6 ft 11 in (2.11 m)	240 lb (109 kg)	Sr	Bethlehem Catholic (PA)	Stewartsville, New Jersey

Head coach

- Bill Carmody (Union (NY))

Assistant coach(es)

- Joe Scott (Princeton)
- Joe Kennedy (Northwestern)
- Freddie Owens (Wisconsin)

Legend

- (C) Team captain
- (S) Suspended
- (I) Ineligible
- (W) Walk-on
- Injured
- Current redshirt

Roster

== Schedule and results ==
Date time, TV	Rank^{#}	Opponent^{#}	Result	Record	Site (attendance) city, state
Exhibition
Nov 3*; 7:05 pm		Assumption	W 63–48		Hart Center (487); Worcester, MA
Non-conference regular season
Nov 13*; 6:00 pm		at South Carolina; Brooklyn Hoops Holiday Invitational	L 49–81	0–1	Colonial Life Arena (9,270); Columbia, SC
Nov 15*; 7:00 pm, ACCN Extra		at No. 18 Syracuse; Brooklyn Hoops Holiday Invitational	L 46–90	0–2	Carrier Dome (21,405); Syracuse, NY
Nov 20*; 1:05 pm		UMass	L 60–68	0–3	DCU Center (3,591); Worcester, MA
Nov 22*; 7:00 pm		at Harvard	W 63–52	1–3	Lavietes Pavilion (1,609); Cambridge, MA
Nov 25*; 1:05 pm		South Carolina State; Brooklyn Hoops Holiday Invitational	W 63–52	2–3	Hart Center (1,554); Worcester MA
Nov 27*; 12:05 pm		Monmouth; Brooklyn Hoops Holiday Invitational	L 77–80	2–4	Hart Center (1,565); Worcester MA
Nov 30*; 7:00 pm		at Albany	W 55–49	3–4	SEFCU Arena (2,518); Albany, NY
Dec 3*; 7:00 pm		at New Hampshire	L 53–56	3–5	Lundholm Gym (612); Durham, NH
Dec 7*; 5:30 pm		at Maine	L 53–55	3–6	Cross Insurance Center; Bangor, ME
Dec 11*; 1:05 pm		Quinnipiac	W 75–57	4–6	Hart Center (1,477); Worcester, MA
Dec 18*; 12:00 pm		at Rhode Island	L 54–65	4–7	Ryan Center (3,537); Kingston, RI
Dec 21*; 7:00 pm		at Sacred Heart	W 72–67	5–7	William H. Pitt Center (262); Fairfield, CT
Dec 23*; 12:05 pm		Marist	W 68–59	6–7	Hart Center (1,367); Worcester, MA
Patriot League regular season
Dec 30; 7:00 pm		at Boston University	L 55–61	6–8 (0–1)	Case Gym (632); Boston, MA
Jan 2; 7:05 pm		Navy	W 51–50	7–8 (1–1)	Hart Center (1,346); Worcester, MA
Jan 5; 7:00 pm		Colgate	W 67–61	8–8 (2–1)	Cotterell Court (728); Hamilton, NY
Jan 8; 1:05 pm		Bucknell	L 49–68	8–9 (2–2)	Hart Center (1,503); Worcester, MA
Jan 11; 7:05 pm, ASN		Lafayette	W 71–54	9–9 (3–2)	Hart Center (1,239); Worcester, MA
Jan 14; 2:00 pm		at Lehigh	L 51–68	9–10 (3–3)	Stabler Arena (1,261); Bethlehem, PA
Jan 18; 7:00 pm		at Army	W 85–76	10–10 (4–3)	Christl Arena (725); West Point, NY
Jan 23; 7:05 pm, CBSSN		American	W 63–55	11–10 (5–3)	Hart Center (1,744); Worcester, MA
Jan 25; 7:30 pm		at Loyola (MD)	L 62–65	11–11 (5–4)	Reitz Arena (872); Baltimore, MD
Jan 28; 4:00 pm		at Navy	L 47–60	11–12 (5–5)	Alumni Hall (2,278); Annapolis, MD
Feb 1; 7:05 pm		Colgate	W 56–50	12–12 (6–5)	Hart Center (1,401); Worcester, MA
Feb 6; 7:00 pm, CBSSN		at Bucknell	L 68–82	12–13 (6–6)	Sojka Pavilion (2,615); Lewisburg, PA
Feb 8; 7:00 pm		at Lafayette	L 59–69	12–14 (6–7)	Kirby Sports Center (857); Easton, PA
Feb 12; 12:05 pm, CBSSN		Lehigh	W 61–45	13–14 (7–7)	Hart Center (1,876); Worcester, MA
Feb 15; 7:05 pm		Army	L 47–52	13–15 (7–8)	Hart Center (1,453); Worcester, MA
Feb 19; 12:00 pm		at American	W 69–54	14–15 (8–8)	Bender Arena; Washington, D.C.
Feb 22; 7:05 pm		Loyola (MD)	W 63–62	15–15 (9–8)	Hart Center (1,497); Worcester, MA
Feb 25; 12:05 pm		Boston University	L 68–71 ^{OT}	15–16 (9–9)	Hart Center (3,548); Worcester, MA
Patriot League tournament
Mar 02; 7:00 pm	(5)	at (4) Navy; Quarterfinals	L 42–49	15–17	Hart Center (988); Worcester, MA
*Non-conference game. ^{#}Rankings from AP Poll. (#) Tournament seedings in parentheses. All times are in Eastern Time.
