= 2016–17 Navy Midshipmen men's basketball team =

American college basketball season

2016–17 Navy Midshipmen men's basketball
- Conference: Patriot League
- Record: 16–16 (10–8 Patriot)
- Head coach: Ed DeChellis (6th season)
- Assistant coaches: Emmett Davis; Ernie Nestor; Jon Perry; Kendrick Saunders; Jeromy Yetter
- Home arena: Alumni Hall

2016–17 Patriot League men's basketball standings
	Conf.				Overall
Team	W		L	PCT	W		L	PCT
Bucknell †	15	–	3	.833	26	–	9	.743
Lehigh	12	–	6	.667	20	–	12	.625
Boston University	12	–	6	.667	18	–	14	.563
Navy	10	–	8	.556	16	–	16	.500
Holy Cross	9	–	9	.500	15	–	17	.469
Loyola (MD)	8	–	10	.444	16	–	17	.485
Colgate	8	–	10	.444	10	–	22	.313
Army	6	–	12	.333	13	–	19	.406
Lafayette	5	–	13	.278	9	–	21	.300
American	5	–	13	.278	8	–	22	.267
† 2017 Patriot League tournament winner

The 2016–17 Navy Midshipmen men's basketball team represented the United States Naval Academy during the 2016–17 NCAA Division I men's basketball season. The Midshipmen, led by sixth-year head coach Ed DeChellis, played their home games at Alumni Hall in Annapolis, Maryland and are members of the Patriot League. They finished the season 16–16, 10–8 in Patriot League play to finish in fourth place. In the Patriot League tournament, they defeated Holy Cross in the quarterfinals before losing to top-seeded Bucknell in the semifinals.

== Previous season ==
The Midshipmen finished the 2015–16 season 19–14, 9–9 in Patriot League play to finish in a four-way tie for fourth place. They defeated Lafayette in the first round of the Patriot League tournament before losing in the quarterfinals to Lehigh. Despite having 19 wins, they did not participate in a postseason tournament.

== Offseason ==
=== Departures ===
Name	Number	Pos.	Height	Weight	Year	Hometown	Notes
Will Kelly	0	C	6'9"	238	Senior	Mount Laurel, NJ	Graduated
Kendall Knorr	3	G	6'3"	200	Senior	Concord, NC	Graduated
Tilman Dunbar	10	G	5'10"	163	Senior	Woodbridge, VA	Graduated
Nathan Messer	24	G	6'4"	198	Freshman	Chesterfield, MO	No longer on team roster
Michael Brown	25	G	6'2"	206	Junior	Horsham, PA	No longer on team roster
Aaron Still-Lock	30	C	6'9"	204	Freshman	Palmyra, PA	No longer on team roster
Fred Davies	34	G	5'11"	180	Freshman	Columbus, GA	No longer on team roster
Mitchell Baldwin	40	G	6'3"	201	Freshman	Birmingham, AL	No longer on team roster
Josh Goetz	42	C	6'8"	254	Sophomore	Valencia, PA	No longer on team roster
Jack Hogan	44	F	6'6"	217	Sophomore	Melbourne, FL	Transferred

== Roster ==
2016–17 Navy Midshipmen men's basketball team
Players
Coaches

Pos.	#	Name	Height	Weight	Year	Previous school	Hometown
G	0	Nourse Fox	6 ft 1 in (1.85 m)	195 lb (88 kg)	Jr	Memphis University School	Memphis, TN
F	1	Tom Lacey	6 ft 7 in (2.01 m)	225 lb (102 kg)	Jr	Seton Hall Prep	Glen Ridge, NJ
G	2	Hasan Abdullah	6 ft 0 in (1.83 m)	195 lb (88 kg)	So	Clay-Chalkville	Trussville, AL
G	3	Matt Cullen	6 ft 1 in (1.85 m)	175 lb (79 kg)	Fr	Greater Latrobe	Latrobe, PA
G	5	Ryan Pearson	6 ft 2 in (1.88 m)	188 lb (85 kg)	So	Henrico	Richmond, VA
G	11	Tim Abruzzo	6 ft 3 in (1.91 m)	173 lb (78 kg)	Sr	Pennridge	Perkasie, PA
G	12	Zach Fong	5 ft 11 in (1.8 m)	165 lb (75 kg)	Sr	Gar-Field	Woodbridge, VA
G	14	Bryce Dulin	6 ft 4 in (1.93 m)	200 lb (91 kg)	Jr	Nixa	Nixa, MO
G	15	Dom Antonelli	6 ft 1 in (1.85 m)	178 lb (81 kg)	So	Trinity	Mechanicsburg, PA
G	20	Shawn Anderson	6 ft 4 in (1.93 m)	203 lb (92 kg)	Jr	New Castle	New Castle, PA
F	21	George Kiernan	6 ft 7 in (2.01 m)	211 lb (96 kg)	So	Hinsdale Central	Hinsdale, IL
G	22	Grant Vermeer	6 ft 2 in (1.88 m)	193 lb (88 kg)	Sr	Bellarmine Prep	Mountain View, CA
F	23	Mo Lewis	6 ft 6 in (1.98 m)	222 lb (101 kg)	So	Milton	Alpharetta, GA
F	32	James Hemphill	6 ft 6 in (1.98 m)	217 lb (98 kg)	Sr	Broughton	Raleigh, NC
C	33	Edward Alade	6 ft 9 in (2.06 m)	233 lb (106 kg)	Sr	Kempner	Houston, TX
G	35	Aaron Briggs	6 ft 0 in (1.83 m)	178 lb (81 kg)	So	Bullis	Largo, MD

Head coach

- Ed DeChellis (Penn State)

Assistant coach(es)

- Emmett Davis (St. Lawrence)
- Ernie Nestor (Alderson Broaddus)
- Jon Perry (East Tennessee State)
- Kendrick Saunders (Palm Beach Atlantic)
- Jeromy Yetter (Lock Haven)

Legend

- (C) Team captain
- (S) Suspended
- (I) Ineligible
- (W) Walk-on
- Injured
- Current redshirt

Roster

== Schedule and results ==
Date time, TV	Rank^{#}	Opponent^{#}	Result	Record	Site (attendance) city, state
Non-conference regular season
11/11/2016*; 9:00 pm, CBSSN		Ohio State; Veterans Classic	L 68–78	0–1	Alumni Hall (4,116); Annapolis, MD
11/13/2016*; 2:00 pm		Washington College (MD); HPU Tournament	W 74–47	1–1	Alumni Hall (1,258); Annapolis, MD
11/18/2016*; 4:00 pm		vs. North Dakota State; HPU Tournament	L 59–66	1–2	Millis Athletic Center (1,750); High Point, NC
11/19/2016*; 4:00 pm		at High Point; HPU Tournament	L 62–69	1–3	Millis Athletic Center (1,750); High Point, NC
11/20/2016*; 3:30 pm		vs. UNC Greensboro; HPU Tournament	L 59–72	1–4	Millis Athletic Center (1,100); High Point, NC
11/23/2016*; 7:00 pm		UMBC	W 78–66	2–4	Alumni Hall (867); Annapolis, MD
11/26/2016*; 2:00 pm		Penn	W 70–68	3–4	Alumni Hall (787); Annapolis, MD
12/01/2016*; 7:30 pm		at College of Charleston	L 64–70	3–5	TD Arena (3,327); Charleston, SC
12/03/2016*; 4:00 pm, ESPN3		at Furman	L 46–79	3–6	Timmons Arena (1,506); Greenville, NC
12/06/2016*; 7:00 pm		Bryant	W 76–74	4–6	Alumni Hall (417); Annapolis, MD
12/09/2016*; 7:00 pm		Columbia	W 69–54	5–6	Alumni Hall (876); Annapolis, MD
12/22/2016*; 11:00 am		at Hartford	L 54–63	5–7	Chase Arena at Reich Family Pavilion (2,453); Hartford, CT
Patriot League regular season
12/30/2016; 7:00 pm		Bucknell	L 55–59	5–8 (0–1)	Alumni Hall (2,301); Annapolis, MD
01/02/2017; 7:00 pm		at Holy Cross	L 50–51	5–9 (0–2)	Hart Center (1,346); Worcester, MA
01/05/2017; 7:00 pm		Boston University	L 53–71	5–10 (0–3)	Alumni Hall; Annapolis, MD
01/08/2017; 2:00 pm		Colgate	W 67–55	6–10 (1–3)	Alumni Hall (1,158); Annapolis, MD
01/11/2017; 7:30 pm		at Loyola (MD)	W 75–62	7–10 (2–3)	Reitz Arena (592); Baltimore, MD
01/14/2017; 2:00 pm		at Lafayette	W 88–51	8–10 (3–3)	Kirby Sports Center (1,547); Easton, PA
01/18/2017; 7:00 pm		Lehigh	W 75–72	9–10 (4–3)	Alumni Hall (1,292); Annapolis, MD
01/21/2017; 1:30 pm, CBSSN		at Army	W 96–80 ^{OT}	10–10 (5–3)	Christl Arena (5,291); West Point, NY
01/25/2017; 7:30 pm		at American	W 71–53	11–10 (6–3)	Bender Arena (757); Washington, D.C.
01/28/2017; 4:00 pm		Holy Cross	W 60–47	12–10 (7–3)	Alumni Hall (2,278); Annapolis, MD
02/02/2017; 7:00 pm		at Boston University	W 70–61	13–10 (8–3)	Case Gym (646); Boston, MA
02/04/2017; 2:00 pm		at Colgate	L 52–55	13–11 (8–4)	Cotterell Court (985); Hamilton, NY
02/08/2017; 7:00 pm		Loyola (MD)	W 62–59	14–11 (9–4)	Alumni Hall (1,435); Annapolis, MD
02/11/2017; 7:00 pm		Lafayette	W 68–60	15–11 (10–4)	Alumni Hall (2,422); Annapolis, MD
02/15/2017; 7:00 pm		at Lehigh	L 55–74	15–12 (10–5)	Stabler Arena (1,007); Bethlehem, PA
02/18/2017; 1:30 pm, CBSSN		Army	L 68–71	15–13 (10–6)	Alumni Hall (5,710); Annapolis, MD
02/22/2017; 7:00 pm		American	L 58–74	15–14 (10–7)	Alumni Hall (2,666); Annapolis, MD
02/25/2017; 12:00 pm		at Bucknell	W 82–60	15–15 (10–8)	Sojka Pavilion (3,551); Lewisburg, PA
Patriot League tournament
03/02/2017; 7:00 pm	(4)	(5) Holy Cross; Quarterfinals	W 49–42	16–15	Alumni Hall (988); Annapolis, MD
03/05/2017; 2:00 pm, CBSSN	(4)	at (1) Bucknell; Semifinals	L 65–70	16–16	Sojka Pavilion (2,731); Lewisburg, PA
*Non-conference game. ^{#}Rankings from AP Poll. (#) Tournament seedings in parentheses. All times are in Eastern Time Source.
