= 2016–17 Lafayette Leopards men's basketball team =

American college basketball season

2016–17 Lafayette Leopards men's basketball
- Conference: Patriot League
- Record: 9–21 (5–13 Patriot)
- Head coach: Fran O'Hanlon (22nd season)
- Assistant coaches: Pat Doherty; Matt Blue; Jimmy Fenerty
- Home arena: Kirby Sports Center

2016–17 Patriot League men's basketball standings
	Conf.				Overall
Team	W		L	PCT	W		L	PCT
Bucknell †	15	–	3	.833	26	–	9	.743
Lehigh	12	–	6	.667	20	–	12	.625
Boston University	12	–	6	.667	18	–	14	.563
Navy	10	–	8	.556	16	–	16	.500
Holy Cross	9	–	9	.500	15	–	17	.469
Loyola (MD)	8	–	10	.444	16	–	17	.485
Colgate	8	–	10	.444	10	–	22	.313
Army	6	–	12	.333	13	–	19	.406
Lafayette	5	–	13	.278	9	–	21	.300
American	5	–	13	.278	8	–	22	.267
† 2017 Patriot League tournament winner

The 2016–17 Lafayette Leopards men's basketball team represented Lafayette College during the 2016–17 NCAA Division I men's basketball season. The Leopards, led by 22nd-year head coach Fran O'Hanlon, played their home games at the Kirby Sports Center in Easton, Pennsylvania as members of the Patriot League. They finished the season 9–21, 5–13 in Patriot League play to finish in a tie for ninth place. As the No. 10 seed in the Patriot League tournament, they lost in the first round to Loyola (MD).

== Previous season ==
The Leopards finished the 2015–16 season 6–24, 3–15 in Patriot League play to finish in last place. They lost to Navy in the first round of the Patriot League tournament.

== Offseason ==
=== Departures ===
Name	Number	Pos.	Height	Weight	Year	Hometown	Notes
Bryce Scott	14	G	6'2"	190	Senior	El Dorado Hills, CA	Graduated
Zach Rufer	21	G	6'2"	198	Senior	Blomingburg, NY	Graduated
Tyler Barlow	24	F	6'8"	192	Freshman	Corpus Christi, TX	Transferred to Blinn College
Ben Feeland	34	F	6'10"	210	Senior	Santa Rosa, CA	Graduated
Billy Murphy	44	F	6'10"	227	Senior	Greenwich, CT	Walk-on; graduated
Nathaniel Musters	54	C	6'10"	267	Senior	Sydney, Australia	Graduated

=== 2016 recruiting class ===
College recruiting information
Name	Hometown	School	Height	Weight	Commit date
Kyle Stout #90 SF	Allentown, PA	Parkland High School	6 ft 6 in (1.98 m)	195 lb (88 kg)	May 5, 2015
Kyle Stout #90 SF	Recruit ratings: Scout: Rivals: (60)				
Myles Cherry; PF	Newcastle, Australia	Choate Rosemary Hall	6 ft 8 in (2.03 m)	210 lb (95 kg)	Dec 29, 2015
Myles Cherry; PF	Recruit ratings: Scout: Rivals: (58)				
Hunter Janacek; SG	Houston, TX	Scarborough High School	6 ft 4 in (1.93 m)	165 lb (75 kg)	Jul 29, 2015
Hunter Janacek; SG	Recruit ratings: Scout: Rivals: (NR)				
Cal Reichwein; PG	Doylestown, PA	Central Bucks West High School	6 ft 2 in (1.88 m)	185 lb (84 kg)	Nov 8, 2015
Cal Reichwein; PG	Recruit ratings: Scout: Rivals: (NR)				
Overall recruit ranking:
Note: In many cases, Scout, Rivals, 247Sports, On3, and ESPN may conflict in their listings of height and weight.; In these cases, the average was taken. ESPN grades are on a 100-point scale.; Sources: "2016 Team Ranking". Rivals.

=== 2017 recruiting class ===
College recruiting information (2017)
Name	Hometown	School	Height	Weight	Commit date
Alexander Petrie; PG	Richmond, VA	St. Christopher's School	6 ft 2 in (1.88 m)	180 lb (82 kg)	May 5, 2015
Alexander Petrie; PG	Recruit ratings: Scout: Rivals: (NR)				
Overall recruit ranking:
Note: In many cases, Scout, Rivals, 247Sports, On3, and ESPN may conflict in their listings of height and weight.; In these cases, the average was taken. ESPN grades are on a 100-point scale.; Sources: "2017 Team Ranking". Rivals.

== Roster ==
2016–17 Lafayette Leopards men's basketball team
Players
Coaches

Pos.	#	Name	Height	Weight	Year	Previous school	Hometown
G	3	Jacob Orender (W)	6 ft 0 in (1.83 m)	176 lb (80 kg)	So	Fletcher	Jacksonville Beach, FL
G	4	Eric Stafford	6 ft 5 in (1.96 m)	162 lb (73 kg)	Jr	Pitman	Pitman, NJ
G	5	Hunter Janacek	6 ft 4 in (1.93 m)	190 lb (86 kg)	Fr	Scarborough	Houston, TX
G	10	Jimmy Panzini (W)	6 ft 1 in (1.85 m)	185 lb (84 kg)	Fr	Point Pleasant Beach	Spring Lake, NJ
G	11	Nick Lindner	5 ft 11 in (1.8 m)	172 lb (78 kg)	Sr	Germantown Academy	Doylestown, PA
G	12	Auston Evans	6 ft 6 in (1.98 m)	186 lb (84 kg)	So	Greenhill	McKinney, TX
F	13	Matt Klinewski	6 ft 8 in (2.03 m)	234 lb (106 kg)	Jr	Eastern Regional	Voorhees, NJ
G	14	Cal Reichwein	6 ft 2 in (1.88 m)	185 lb (84 kg)	Fr	Central Bucks West	Doylestown, PA
F	20	Dom Cristiano (W)	6 ft 8 in (2.03 m)	195 lb (88 kg)	Fr	Greens Farms Academy	Valhalla, NY
F	23	Lukas Jarrett	6 ft 7 in (2.01 m)	195 lb (88 kg)	Fr	Northport	Northport, NY
F	22	Sam Dunkum	6 ft 10 in (2.08 m)	215 lb (98 kg)	So	North Little Rock	North Little Rock, AR
G	24	Kyle Stout	6 ft 6 in (1.98 m)	190 lb (86 kg)	Fr	Parkland	Schnecksville, PA
G	32	Monty Boykins	6 ft 5 in (1.96 m)	195 lb (88 kg)	Sr	Lakota West	West Chester, OH
F	33	Paulius Zalys	6 ft 7 in (2.01 m)	202 lb (92 kg)	So	The Perkiomen School	Kaunas, Lithuania
F	54	Myles Cherry	6 ft 8 in (2.03 m)	232 lb (105 kg)	Fr	Choate Rosemary Hall	Newcastle, Australia

Head coach

- Fran O'Hanlon (Villanova)

Assistant coach(es)

- Pat Doherty (Lafayette)
- Matt Blue (St. Lawrence)
- Jimmy Fenerty (Dickinson State)

Legend

- (C) Team captain
- (S) Suspended
- (I) Ineligible
- (W) Walk-on
- Injured
- Current redshirt

Roster

== Schedule and results ==
Date time, TV	Rank^{#}	Opponent^{#}	Result	Record	Site (attendance) city, state
Non-conference regular season
11/11/2016*; 6:30 pm, FS2		at No. 4 Villanova	L 44–84	0–1	The Pavilion (6,500); Villanova, PA
11/14/2016*; 7:00 pm		at Saint Peter's	W 61–57	1–1	Yanitelli Center (632); Jersey City, NJ
11/17/2016*; 7:00 pm		NJIT	W 84–83 ^{OT}	2–1	Kirby Sports Center (1,539); Easton, PA
11/20/2016*; 2:00 pm		Cornell	L 75–82	2–2	Kirby Sports Center (1,821); Easton, PA
11/23/2016*; 7:00 pm		Princeton	L 55–71	2–3	Kirby Sports Center (1,077); Easton, PA
11/30/2016*; 8:00 pm		Drexel	L 70–74	2–4	Kirby Sports Center (1,134); Easton, PA
12/05/2016*; 7:00 pm		at St. Francis Brooklyn	W 74–72	3–4	Generoso Pope Athletic Complex (450); Brooklyn, NY
12/07/2016*; 8:00 pm		at Penn	L 52–81	3–5	Palestra (1,677); Philadelphia, PA
12/11/2016*; 2:00 pm		Sacred Heart	L 61–85	3–6	Kirby Sports Center (1,546); Easton, PA
12/19/2016*; 7:00 pm		Moravian	W 104–67	4–6	Kirby Sports Center (1,492); Easton, PA
12/21/2016*; 7:00 pm		at Saint Joseph's	L 63–92	4–7	Hagan Arena (3,411); Philadelphia, PA
Patriot League regular season
12/30/2016; 7:00 pm		Colgate	L 75–85	4–8 (0–1)	Kirby Sports Center (1,942); Easton, PA
01/02/2017; 7:30 pm		at Loyola (MD)	W 78–69	5–8 (1–1)	Reitz Arena (418); Baltimore, MD
01/05/2017; 7:00 pm		Army	W 79–74	6–8 (2–1)	Kirby Sports Center (1,541); Easton, PA
01/08/2017; 2:00 pm		Boston University	L 75–91	6–9 (2–2)	Kirby Sports Center (1,477); Easton, PA
01/11/2017; 7:00 pm, ASN		at Holy Cross	L 54–71	6–10 (2–3)	Hart Center (1,239); Worcester, MA
01/14/2017; 2:00 pm		Navy	L 51–88	6–11 (2–4)	Kirby Sports Center (1,547); Easton, PA
01/18/2017; 7:30 pm		at American	L 57–71	6–12 (2–5)	Bender Arena (857); Washington, D.C.
01/21/2017; 7:00 pm		at Lehigh	L 68–75	6–13 (2–6)	Stabler Arena (2,103); Bethlehem, PA
01/25/2017; 7:00 pm		Bucknell	L 55–78	6–14 (2–7)	Kirby Sports Center (1,549); Easton, PA
01/28/2017; 2:00 pm		Loyola (MD)	L 62–70	6–15 (2–8)	Kirby Sports Center (1,377); Easton, PA
02/01/2017; 7:00 pm		at Army	L 73–80	6–16 (2–9)	Christl Arena (523); West Point, NY
02/05/2017; 12:00 pm, CBSSN		at Boston University	L 58–75	6–17 (2–10)	Case Gym (526); Boston, MA
02/08/2017; 7:00 pm		Holy Cross	W 69–59	7–17 (3–10)	Kirby Sports Center (857); Easton, PA
02/11/2017; 7:00 pm		at Navy	W 68–60	7–18 (3–11)	Alumni Hall (2,422); Annapolis, MD
02/15/2017; 7:00 pm		American	W 78–65	8–18 (4–11)	Kirby Sports Center (1,247); Easton, PA
02/19/2017; 12:00 pm		Lehigh	L 55–81	8–19 (4–12)	Kirby Sports Center (2,177); Easton, PA
02/22/2017; 7:00 pm		at Bucknell	L 64–94	8–20 (4–13)	Sojka Pavilion (1,593); Lewisburg, PA
02/25/2017; 2:00 pm		at Colgate	W 73–69	9–20 (5–13)	Cotterell Court (1,057); Hamilton, NY
Patriot League tournament
02/282017; 7:00 pm	(10)	at (7) Loyola (MD); First round	L 64–67	9–21	Reitz Arena (472); Baltimore, MD
*Non-conference game. ^{#}Rankings from AP Poll. (#) Tournament seedings in parentheses. All times are in Eastern Time Source.

== See also ==
2016–17 Lafayette Leopards women's basketball team
