= 2017 Patriot League men's basketball tournament =

- Classification: Division I
- Season: 2016–17
- Teams: 10
- Site: Campus sites
- Champions: Bucknell (5th title)
- Winning coach: Nathan Davis (1st title)
- MVP: Zach Thomas (Bucknell)
- Attendance: 13,489
- Television: PLN, CBSSN

2016–17 Patriot League men's basketball standings
	Conf.				Overall
Team	W		L	PCT	W		L	PCT
Bucknell †	15	–	3	.833	26	–	9	.743
Lehigh	12	–	6	.667	20	–	12	.625
Boston University	12	–	6	.667	18	–	14	.563
Navy	10	–	8	.556	16	–	16	.500
Holy Cross	9	–	9	.500	15	–	17	.469
Loyola (MD)	8	–	10	.444	16	–	17	.485
Colgate	8	–	10	.444	10	–	22	.313
Army	6	–	12	.333	13	–	19	.406
Lafayette	5	–	13	.278	9	–	21	.300
American	5	–	13	.278	8	–	22	.267
† 2017 Patriot League tournament winner

The 2017 Patriot League men's basketball tournament was the postseason conference tournament for the Patriot League. It was played February 28, March 2, 5, and 8, 2017 with the higher seed in each matchup hosting at their respective campus sites. Bucknell defeated Lehigh, 81–65, in the championship game to win the Tournament. As a result, Bucknell received the conference's automatic bid to the NCAA tournament.

== Seeds ==
All 10 Patriot League teams were eligible for the tournament. The top six teams received a first round bye. Teams were seeded by record within the conference, with a tiebreaker system to seed teams with identical conference records.

Seed	School	Conference	Tiebreaker 1	Tiebreaker 2
1	Bucknell	15–3		
2	Boston University	12–6	2–0 vs. Lehigh	
3	Lehigh	12–6	0–2 vs. Boston U.	
4	Navy	10–8		
5	Holy Cross	9–9		
6	Colgate	8–10	2–0 vs. Loyola (MD)	
7	Loyola (MD)	8–10	0–2 vs. Colgate	
8	Army	6–12		
9	American	5–13	1–1 vs. Lafayette	0–2 vs Top 3 each, 1–1 vs Navy
10	Lafayette	5–13	1–1 vs. American	0–2 vs Top 3 each, 0–2 vs Navy

== Schedule ==
Game	Time*	Matchup	Score	Attendance	Television
First round – Tuesday, February 28
1	7:00 pm	No. 9 American at No. 8 Army	58–74	263	PLN
2	7:30 pm	No. 10 Lafayette at No. 7 Loyola (MD)	64–67	472	PLN
Quarterfinals – Thursday, March 2
3	7:00 pm	No. 8 Army at No. 1 Bucknell	62–78	2,151	PLN
4	7:00 pm	No. 5 Holy Cross at No. 4 Navy	42–49	988	PLN
5	7:00 pm	No. 6 Colgate at No. 3 Lehigh	72–77	1,609	PLN
6	7:00 pm	No. 7 Loyola (MD) at No. 2 Boston University	60–64	510	PLN
Semifinals – Sunday, March 5
7	12:00 pm	No. 3 Lehigh at No. 2 Boston University	91–88^{2OT}	511	CBSSN
8	2:00 pm	No. 4 Navy at No. 1 Bucknell	65–70	2,731	CBSSN
Championship – Wednesday, March 8
9	7:30 pm	No. 3 Lehigh at No. 1 Bucknell	65–81	4,254	CBSSN
*Game times in ET. Rankings denote tournament seeding. All games hosted by higher-seeded team.

== Bracket ==
First round February 28; Patriot League Network
8	Army	74
9	American	58
7	Loyola (MD)	67
10	Lafayette	64

Quarterfinals; March 2 Patriot League Network
1	Bucknell	78
8	Army	62
4	Navy	49
5	Holy Cross	42
2	Boston University	64
7	Loyola (MD)	60
3	Lehigh	77
6	Colgate	72

Semifinals; March 5 CBS Sports Network
1	Bucknell	70
4	Navy	65
2	Boston University	88
3	Lehigh	91**

Championship; March 8 CBS Sports Network
1	Bucknell	81
3	Lehigh	65

* indicates overtime period.
