= Nathan Davis (basketball) =

American college basketball coach (born 1974)

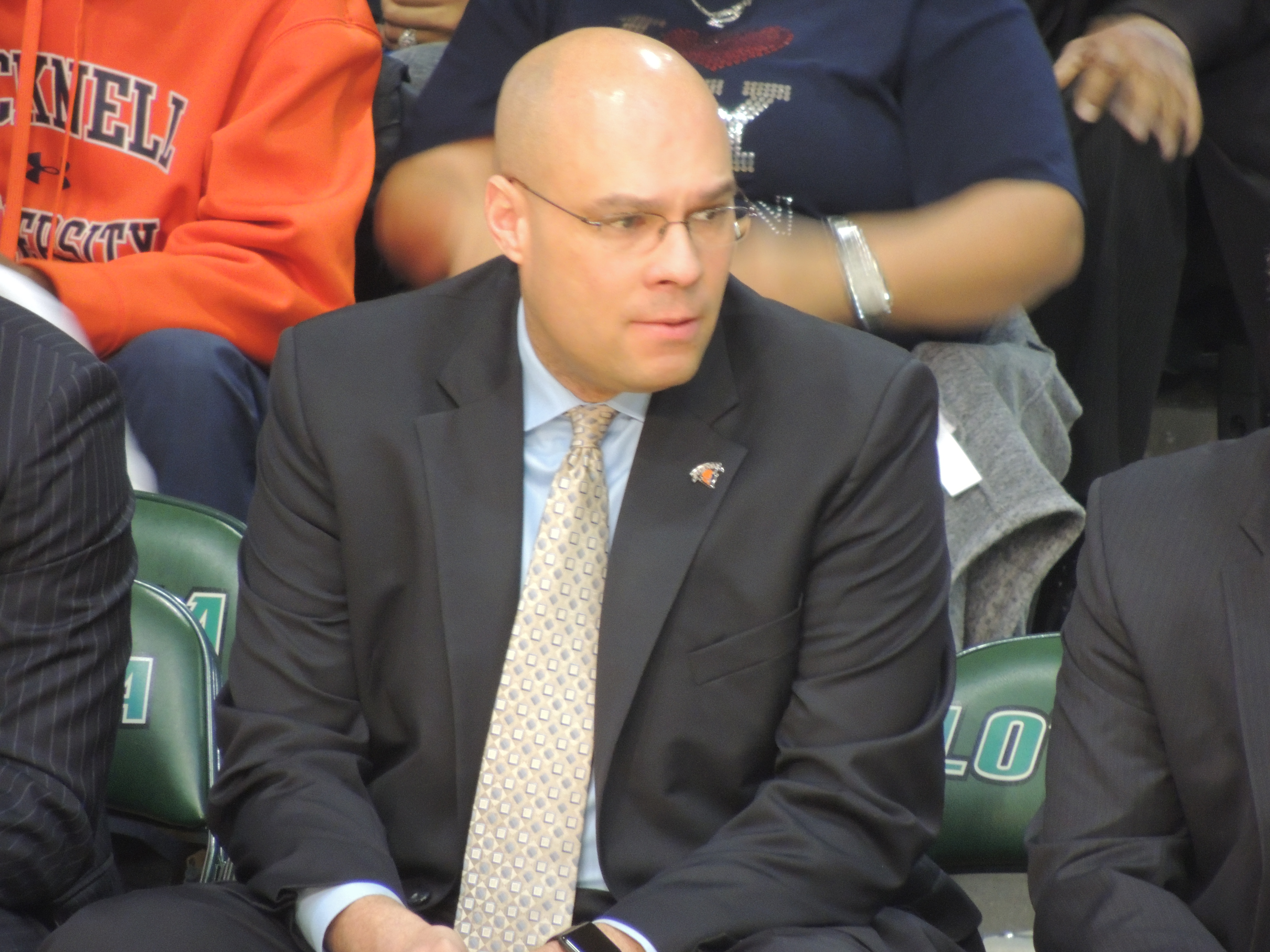
- Davis coaching a game in February, 2017

Current position
- Title: Head coach
- Team: New Hampshire
- Conference: America East
- Record: 37–63 (.370)

Biographical details
- Born: March 25, 1974 (age 52); Washington, D.C., U.S.

Playing career
- 1992–1996: Randolph–Macon

Coaching career (HC unless noted)
- 1997–1998: Emory and Henry (assistant)
- 1998–2003: Navy (assistant)
- 2003–2008: Bucknell (assistant)
- 2008–2009: Colgate (assistant)
- 2009–2015: Randolph–Macon
- 2015–2023: Bucknell
- 2023–present: New Hampshire

Head coaching record
- Overall: 307–217 (.586)
- Tournaments: 0–2 (NCAA Division I); 0–1 (NIT); 9–6 (NCAA Division III)

Accomplishments and honors

Championships
- 3 ODAC regular season (2011, 2014, 2015); 3 ODAC tournament (2011, 2013, 2015); 4 Patriot League regular season (2016–2019); 2 Patriot League tournament (2017, 2018)

Awards
- 2× ODAC Coach of the Year (2014, 2015); 2× Patriot League Coach of the Year (2016, 2017)

Nathan Davis (born March 25, 1974) is an American college basketball coach. He is currently the head coach of the New Hampshire Wildcats men's basketball team. He previously served as the men's basketball coach at Bucknell from 2015 to 2023 and Randolph–Macon from 2009 to 2015.

== Playing career ==
Davis played college basketball at Randolph–Macon, where he was a two-time captain and two-time Old Dominion Athletic Conference all-conference selection.

== Coaching career ==
Davis got his coaching start at Emory and Henry for a single season before assistant coaching stops at both Navy, Bucknell and Colgate before returning to his alma mater as head coach in 2009, replacing Mike Rhoades.In six seasons with the Yellow Jackets, Davis guided the team to a 141–39 overall record with six NCAA Division III tournament appearances, including a Final Four in 2009.

In 2015, Davis took over for Dave Paulsen at Bucknell where in eight seasons, Davis led the Bison to four Patriot League regular season titles from 2015 to 2019, as well as two conference tournament titles and appearances in the 2017 and 2018 NCAA tournament. On March 3, 2023, Davis was let go as the head coach at Bucknell, where he finished with a 129–115 overall record.

On April 7, 2023, he was hired as the new head coach at New Hampshire, replacing Bill Herrion.

== Head coaching record ==
Record table
Season	Team	Overall	Conference	Standing	Postseason
Randolph–Macon Yellow Jackets (Old Dominion Athletic Conference) (2009–2015)
2009–10	Randolph–Macon	26–7	11–5	4th	NCAA Division III Final Four
2010–11	Randolph–Macon	25–5	13–3	1st	NCAA Division III second round
2011–12	Randolph–Macon	21–7	12–4	2nd	NCAA Division III first round
2012–13	Randolph–Macon	21–10	11–5	3rd	NCAA Division III third round
2013–14	Randolph–Macon	20–7	14–2	1st	NCAA Division III first round
2014–15	Randolph–Macon	28–3	16–0	1st	NCAA Division III Elite Eight
Randolph–Macon:		141–39 (.783)	77–19 (.802)		
Bucknell Bison (Patriot League) (2015–2023)
2015–16	Bucknell	17–14	14–4	1st	NIT first round
2016–17	Bucknell	26–9	15–3	1st	NCAA Division I first round
2017–18	Bucknell	25–10	16–2	1st	NCAA Division I first round
2018–19	Bucknell	21–12	13–5	T–1st	
2019–20	Bucknell	14–20	8–10	T–6th	
2020–21	Bucknell	5–7	4–6	2nd (Central)	
2021–22	Bucknell	9–23	5–13	9th	
2022–23	Bucknell	12–20	5–13	10th	
Bucknell:		129–115 (.529)	80–56 (.588)		
New Hampshire Wildcats (America East Conference) (2023–present)
2023–24	New Hampshire	16–15	7–9	T–4th	
2024–25	New Hampshire	8–24	6–10	T–6th	
2025–26	New Hampshire	9–21	5–11	T–7th	
2026–27	New Hampshire	4–3	0–0		
New Hampshire:		37–63 (.370)	18–30 (.375)		
Total:		307–217 (.586)			
National champion Postseason invitational champion Conference regular season champion Conference regular season and conference tournament champion Division regular season champion Division regular season and conference tournament champion Conference tournament champion
