= 2015–16 Navy Midshipmen men's basketball team =

American college basketball season

2015–16 Navy Midshipmen men's basketball

Spartan Showcase champions
- Conference: Patriot League
- Record: 19–14 (9–9 Patriot)
- Head coach: Ed DeChellis (5th season)
- Assistant coaches: Emmett Davis; Ernie Nestor; Jon Perry; Kendrick Saunders; Jeromy Yetter
- Home arena: Alumni Hall

2015–16 Patriot League men's basketball standings
	Conf.				Overall
Team	W		L	PCT	W		L	PCT
Bucknell	14	–	4	.778	17	–	14	.548
Lehigh	13	–	5	.722	17	–	15	.531
Boston University	11	–	7	.611	19	–	15	.559
Army	9	–	9	.500	19	–	14	.576
Navy	9	–	9	.500	19	–	14	.576
Colgate	9	–	9	.500	13	–	17	.433
American	9	–	9	.500	12	–	19	.387
Loyola (MD)	8	–	10	.444	9	–	21	.300
Holy Cross †	5	–	13	.278	15	–	20	.429
Lafayette	3	–	15	.167	6	–	24	.200
† 2016 Patriot League tournament winner

The 2015–16 Navy Midshipmen men's basketball team represented the United States Naval Academy during the 2015–16 NCAA Division I men's basketball season. The Midshipmen, led by fifth year head coach Ed DeChellis, played their home games at Alumni Hall and were members of the Patriot League. They finished the season 19–14, 9–9 in Patriot League play to finish in a four way tie for fourth place. They defeated Lafayette in the first round of the Patriot League tournament to advance to the quarterfinals, where they lost to Lehigh. Despite having 19 wins, they did not participate in a postseason tournament.

== Previous season ==
The Midshipmen finished the season 13–19, 8–10 in Patriot League play to finish in a three way tie for sixth place. They advanced to the quarterfinals of the Patriot League tournament where they lost to Colgate.

== Departures ==
Name	Number	Pos.	Height	Weight	Year	Hometown	Notes
Bradon Venturini	2	G	6'0"	179	Senior	Allendale, MI	Graduated
Kevin Alter	5	G	5'6"	148	Senior	Rumson, NJ	Graduated
Worth Smith	21	F	6'6"	204	Senior	Mooresville, NC	Graduated
Daniel Noe	35	G	6'5"	203	Freshman	Fairfax, VA	No longer on team roster
Nolan Linville	40	C	6'8"	244	Freshman	Fraser, MI	No longer on team roster
Christopher Kinley	42	F	6'7"	245	Freshman	Williamsport, PA	No longer on team roster

== Incoming recruits ==
College recruiting information
Name	Hometown	School	Height	Weight	Commit date
Hasan Abdullah; PG	Trussville, AL	Clay-Chalkville High School	6 ft 0 in (1.83 m)	182 lb (83 kg)	Sep 22, 2014
Hasan Abdullah; PG	Recruit ratings: Scout: Rivals: (NR)				
Nathan Messer; G	Chesterfield, MO	Lafayette High School	6 ft 4 in (1.93 m)	198 lb (90 kg)	--
Nathan Messer; G	Recruit ratings: Scout: Rivals: (NR)				
Aaron Briggs; PG	Largo, MD	Bullis High School	6 ft 0 in (1.83 m)	178 lb (81 kg)	--
Aaron Briggs; PG	Recruit ratings: Scout: Rivals: (NR)				
Mitchell Baldwin; G	Birmingham, AL	Ramsay High School	6 ft 3 in (1.91 m)	201 lb (91 kg)	Sep 22, 2014
Mitchell Baldwin; G	Recruit ratings: Scout: Rivals: (NR)				
Dom Antonelli; PG	Mechanicsburg, PA	Trinity High School	6 ft 1 in (1.85 m)	178 lb (81 kg)	--
Dom Antonelli; PG	Recruit ratings: Scout: Rivals: (NR)				
Aaron Still-Lock; C	Palmyra, NJ	Valley Forge Military Academy	6 ft 9 in (2.06 m)	204 lb (93 kg)	--
Aaron Still-Lock; C	Recruit ratings: Scout: Rivals: (NR)				
Ryan Pearson; PG	Richmond, VA	Henrico High School	6 ft 1 in (1.85 m)	170 lb (77 kg)	Sep 23, 2014
Ryan Pearson; PG	Recruit ratings: Scout: Rivals: (NR)				
George Kiernan; PF	Chicago, IL	Hinsdale Central High School	6 ft 6 in (1.98 m)	210 lb (95 kg)	Sep 24, 2014
George Kiernan; PF	Recruit ratings: Scout: Rivals: (NR)				
Overall recruit ranking:
Note: In many cases, Scout, Rivals, 247Sports, On3, and ESPN may conflict in their listings of height and weight.; In these cases, the average was taken. ESPN grades are on a 100-point scale.; Sources: "2015 Team Ranking". Rivals.

=== 2016 class recruits ===
College recruiting information (2016)
Name	Hometown	School	Height	Weight	Commit date
Jack Lawrence #75 C	Alexandria, VA	Gonzaga College High School	6 ft 8 in (2.03 m)	195 lb (88 kg)	Aug 31, 2015
Jack Lawrence #75 C	Recruit ratings: Scout: Rivals: (57)				
Kyran McClure; PG	Concord, NC	Central Cabarrus High School	6 ft 1 in (1.85 m)	N/A	Sep 24, 2015
Kyran McClure; PG	Recruit ratings: Scout: Rivals: (NR)				
Overall recruit ranking:
Note: In many cases, Scout, Rivals, 247Sports, On3, and ESPN may conflict in their listings of height and weight.; In these cases, the average was taken. ESPN grades are on a 100-point scale.; Sources: "2016 Team Ranking". Rivals.

== Roster ==
2015–16 Navy Midshipmen men's basketball team
Players
Coaches

Pos.	#	Name	Height	Weight	Year	Previous school	Hometown
C	0	Will Kelly	6 ft 9 in (2.06 m)	238 lb (108 kg)	Sr	Pitman	Mount Laurel, NJ
G	1	Nourse Fox	6 ft 0 in (1.83 m)	195 lb (88 kg)	So	Memphis University School	Memphis, TN
G	2	Hasan Abdullah	6 ft 0 in (1.83 m)	182 lb (83 kg)	Fr	Clay-Chalkville	Trussville, AL
G	3	Kendall Knorr	6 ft 3 in (1.91 m)	200 lb (91 kg)	Sr	Concord	Concord, NC
G	5	Ryan Pearson	6 ft 2 in (1.88 m)	188 lb (85 kg)	Fr	Henrico	Richmond, VA
G	10	Tilman Dunbar	5 ft 10 in (1.78 m)	163 lb (74 kg)	Sr	Paul VI Catholic	Woodbridge, VA
G	11	Tim Abruzzo	6 ft 3 in (1.91 m)	173 lb (78 kg)	Jr	Pennridge	Perkasie, PA
G	12	Zach Fong	5 ft 11 in (1.8 m)	165 lb (75 kg)	Jr	Gar-Field	Woodbridge, VA
G	14	Bryce Dulin	6 ft 4 in (1.93 m)	200 lb (91 kg)	So	Nixa	Nixa, MO
G	15	Dom Antonelli	6 ft 1 in (1.85 m)	178 lb (81 kg)	Fr	Trinity	Mechanicsburg, PA
G	20	Shawn Anderson	6 ft 4 in (1.93 m)	203 lb (92 kg)	So	New Castle	New Castle, PA
F	21	George Kiernan	6 ft 7 in (2.01 m)	211 lb (96 kg)	Fr	Hinsdale Central	Hinsdale, IL
G	22	Grant Vermeer	6 ft 2 in (1.88 m)	193 lb (88 kg)	Jr	Bellarmine Prep	Mountain View, CA
F	23	Mo Lewis	6 ft 6 in (1.98 m)	222 lb (101 kg)	Fr	Milton	Alpharetta, GA
G	24	Nathan Messer	6 ft 4 in (1.93 m)	198 lb (90 kg)	Fr	Lafayette	Chesterfield, MO
F	25	Michael Brown	6 ft 2 in (1.88 m)	206 lb (93 kg)	Jr	Hatboro-Horsham	Horsham, PA
C	30	Aaron Still-Lock	6 ft 9 in (2.06 m)	204 lb (93 kg)	Fr	Valley Forge Military Academy	Palmyra, PA
F	31	Tom Lacey	6 ft 7 in (2.01 m)	225 lb (102 kg)	So	Seton Hall Prep	Glen Ridge, NJ
F	32	James Hemphill	6 ft 6 in (1.98 m)	217 lb (98 kg)	Jr	Broughton	Raleigh, NC
C	33	Edward Alade	6 ft 9 in (2.06 m)	233 lb (106 kg)	Jr	Kempner	Houston, TX
G	34	Fred Davies	5 ft 11 in (1.8 m)	180 lb (82 kg)	Fr	Brookstone	Columbus, GA
G	35	Aaron Briggs	6 ft 0 in (1.83 m)	178 lb (81 kg)	Fr	Bullis	Largo, MD
G	40	Mitchell Baldwin	6 ft 3 in (1.91 m)	201 lb (91 kg)	Fr	Ramsay	Birmingham, AL
C	42	Josh Goetz	6 ft 8 in (2.03 m)	254 lb (115 kg)	So	Mars	Valencia, PA
F	44	Jack Hogan	6 ft 6 in (1.98 m)	217 lb (98 kg)	So	Holy Trinity	Melbourne, FL

Head coach

- Ed DeChellis (Penn State)

Assistant coach(es)

- Emmett Davis (St. Lawrence)
- Ernie Nestor (Alderson Broaddus)
- Jon Perry (East Tennessee State)
- Kendrick Saunders (Palm Beach Atlantic)
- Jeromy Yetter (Lock Haven)

Legend

- (C) Team captain
- (S) Suspended
- (I) Ineligible
- (W) Walk-on
- Injured
- Current redshirt

Roster

== Schedule ==
Date time, TV	Rank^{#}	Opponent^{#}	Result	Record	Site (attendance) city, state
Non-conference regular season
11/13/2015*; 9:30 pm, CBSSN		Florida; Veterans Classic	L 41–59	0–1	Alumni Hall (5,710); Annapolis, MD
11/16/2015*; 7:00 pm		College of Charleston	L 58–72	0–2	Alumni Hall (672); Annapolis, MD
11/19/2015*; 7:30 pm		at USC Upstate	W 67–55	1–2	G. B. Hodge Center (805); Spartanburg, SC
11/22/2015*; 12:00 pm		Goucher; Spartan Showcase	W 76–47	2–2	Alumni Hall (1,037); Annapolis, MD
11/25/2015*; 7:00 pm		at UMBC	W 75–54	3–2	Retriever Activities Center (941); Catonsville, MD
11/27/2015*; 7:00 pm		at UNC Greensboro; Spartan Showcase	W 70–66	4–2	Greensboro Coliseum (1,383); Greensboro, NC
11/28/2015*; 4:30 pm		vs. Jacksonville; Spartan Showcase	W 71–65	5–2	Greensboro Coliseum (1,389); Greensboro, NC
11/29/2015*; 12:30 pm		vs. IPFW; Spartan Showcase	W 75–53	6–2	Greensboro Coliseum (1,349); Greensboro, NC
12/02/2015*; 7:00 pm		at Penn	W 65–59	7–2	Palestra (1,277); Philadelphia, PA
12/07/2015*; 9:30 pm, FS1		vs. No. 24 Oregon; Pearl Harbor Classic	L 47–67	7–3	Bloch Arena (4,024); Honolulu, HI
12/12/2015*; 1:30 pm, ESPN3		at VMI	W 68–62	8–3	Cameron Hall (3,124); Lexington, VA
12/14/2015*; 7:00 pm		USC Upstate	L 57–66	8–4	Alumni Hall (438); Annapolis, MD
12/22/2015*; 7:00 pm		Furman	W 62–49	9–4	Alumni Hall (1131); Annapolis, MD
Patriot League regular season
12/30/2015; 7:00 pm		at Bucknell	W 88–58	9–5 (0–1)	Sojka Pavilion (2914); Lewisburg, PA
01/02/2016; 1:00 pm		Holy Cross	W 65–60	10–5 (1–1)	Alumni Hall (2677); Annapolis, MD
01/06/2016; 7:00 pm		at Boston University	W 83–67	11–5 (2–1)	Case Gym (346); Boston, MA
01/09/2016; 2:00 pm		at Colgate	W 71–68 ^{OT}	12–5 (3–1)	Cotterell Court (859); Hamilton, NY
01/13/2016; 7:00 pm		Loyola (MD)	W 60–52	13–5 (4–1)	Alumni Hall (1,698); Annapolis, MD
01/16/2016; 7:00 pm		Lafayette	W 87–61	14–5 (5–1)	Alumni Hall (1,813); Annapolis, MD
01/20/2016; 7:00 pm, Service Electric		at Lehigh	W 69–64	15–5 (6–1)	Stabler Arena (979); Bethlehem, PA
01/27/2016; 7:00 pm		American	W 63–58	15–6 (6–2)	Alumni Hall (1,642); Annapolis, MD
01/30/2016; 1:00 pm		at Holy Cross	L 80–87 ^{OT}	15–7 (6–3)	Hart Center (1,834); Worcester, MA
02/01/2016; 7:30 pm		at Army; Postponed from 1/23/16	W 64–50	16–7 (7–3)	Christl Arena (3,133); West Point, NY
02/03/2016; 7:00 pm		Boston University	L 72–83	16–8 (7–4)	Alumni Hall (1,264); Annapolis, MD
02/06/2016; 4:00 pm		Colgate	L 55–58	16–9 (7–5)	Alumni Hall (1,927); Annapolis, MD
02/10/2016; 7:00 pm		at Loyola (MD)	W 71–51	17–9 (8–5)	Reitz Arena (637); Baltimore, MD
02/13/2016; 2:00 pm		at Lafayette	W 74–68	18–9 (9–5)	Kirby Sports Center (1,932); Easton, PA
02/17/2016; 7:00 pm		Lehigh	L 74–77	18–10 (9–6)	Alumni Hall (1,068); Annapolis, MD
02/20/2016; 1:30 pm, CBSSN		Army	L 78–80 ^{2OT}	18–11 (9–7)	Alumni Hall (5,510); Annapolis, MD
02/24/2016; 7:30 pm		at American	L 65–72	18–12 (9–8)	Bender Arena (653); Washington, D.C.
02/27/2016; 4:00 pm		Bucknell	L 73–77	18–13 (9–9)	Alumni Hall (2,909); Annapolis, MD
Patriot League tournament
03/01/2016; 7:00 pm		Lafayette; First round	W 78–70	19–13	Alumni Hall (687); Annapolis, MD
03/03/2016; 7:00 pm		at Lehigh; Quarterfinals	L 63–65	19–14	Stabler Arena (1,730); Bethlehem, PA
*Non-conference game. ^{#}Rankings from AP Poll. (#) Tournament seedings in parentheses. All times are in Eastern Time.
