= 2015–16 Loyola Greyhounds men's basketball team =

American college basketball season

2015–16 Loyola Greyhounds men's basketball
- Conference: Patriot League
- Record: 9–21 (8–10 Patriot)
- Head coach: G.G. Smith (3rd season)
- Assistant coaches: Keith Booth; Josh Loeffler; Trevor Quinn
- Home arena: Reitz Arena

2015–16 Patriot League men's basketball standings
	Conf.				Overall
Team	W		L	PCT	W		L	PCT
Bucknell	14	–	4	.778	17	–	14	.548
Lehigh	13	–	5	.722	17	–	15	.531
Boston University	11	–	7	.611	19	–	15	.559
Army	9	–	9	.500	19	–	14	.576
Navy	9	–	9	.500	19	–	14	.576
Colgate	9	–	9	.500	13	–	17	.433
American	9	–	9	.500	12	–	19	.387
Loyola (MD)	8	–	10	.444	9	–	21	.300
Holy Cross †	5	–	13	.278	15	–	20	.429
Lafayette	3	–	15	.167	6	–	24	.200
† 2016 Patriot League tournament winner

The 2015–16 Loyola Greyhounds men's basketball team represented Loyola University Maryland during the 2015–16 NCAA Division I men's basketball season. The Greyhounds, led by third year head coach G.G. Smith, played their home games at Reitz Arena and were members of the Patriot League. They finished the season 9–21, 8–10 in Patriot League play to finish in eighth place. They lost in the first round of the Patriot League tournament to Holy Cross.

== Previous season ==
The Greyhounds finished the season 11–19, 7–11 in Patriot League play to finish in ninth place. They lost in the first round of the Patriot League tournament to Holy Cross.

== Departures ==
Name	Number	Pos.	Height	Weight	Year	Hometown	Notes
Stefano Mancini	4	G	6'2"	175	RS Junior	Falmouth, ME	Left the team for personal reasons
Denzel Brito	10	G	6'2"	202	RS Senior	Wareham, MA	Graduated
Colton Bishop	15	G	6'3"	175	Freshman	Winston-Salem, NC	Transferred to UNC Wilmington

== Incoming recruits ==
College recruiting
Name	Hometown	School	Height	Weight	Commit date
James Fives #115 SF	Scranton, PA	The Hill School	6 ft 6 in (1.98 m)	215 lb (98 kg)	Oct 30, 2014
James Fives #115 SF	Recruit ratings: Scout: Rivals: (59)				
Nevell Provo; PG	Pickering, ON	The Hill School	5 ft 11 in (1.80 m)	170 lb (77 kg)	Mar 28, 2015
Nevell Provo; PG	Recruit ratings: Scout: Rivals: (NR)				
Overall recruit ranking:
Note: In many cases, Scout, Rivals, 247Sports, On3, and ESPN may conflict in their listings of height and weight.; In these cases, the average was taken. ESPN grades are on a 100-point scale.; Sources: "2015 Team Ranking". Rivals.

=== 2016 class recruits ===
College recruiting (2016)
Name	Hometown	School	Height	Weight	Commit date
Chuck Champion #80 SG	Philadelphia, PA	Friends' Central School	6 ft 2 in (1.88 m)	N/A	
Chuck Champion #80 SG	Recruit ratings: Scout: Rivals: (61)				
Austin Harriott #90 SF	Philadelphia, PA	The Hun School Of Princeton	6 ft 4 in (1.93 m)	175 lb (79 kg)	Aug 8, 2015
Austin Harriott #90 SF	Recruit ratings: Scout: Rivals: (60)				
Andrew Kostecka; SF	Germantown, MD	Clarksburg High School	6 ft 4 in (1.93 m)	N/A	
Andrew Kostecka; SF	Recruit ratings: Scout: Rivals: (59)				
Dylan Gollihar; C	Richardson, TX	Richardson High School	7 ft 0 in (2.13 m)	N/A	Sep 26, 2015
Dylan Gollihar; C	Recruit ratings: Scout: Rivals: (NR)				
Ian Langendoerfer; SF	Honesdale, PA	Honesdale High School	6 ft 5 in (1.96 m)	N/A	Nov 10, 2015
Ian Langendoerfer; SF	Recruit ratings: Scout: Rivals: (NR)				
Overall recruit ranking:
Note: In many cases, Scout, Rivals, 247Sports, On3, and ESPN may conflict in their listings of height and weight.; In these cases, the average was taken. ESPN grades are on a 100-point scale.; Sources: "2016 Team Ranking". Rivals.

== Roster ==
2015–16 Loyola Greyhounds men's basketball team
Players
Coaches

Pos.	#	Name	Height	Weight	Year	Previous school	Hometown
F	1	Nick Gorski	6 ft 9 in (2.06 m)	255 lb (116 kg)	Jr	Benedictine Prep	Richmond, VA
G	2	Andre Walker	6 ft 0 in (1.83 m)	165 lb (75 kg)	So	Christ the King	Westbury, NY
G	4	Nevell Provo	6 ft 0 in (1.83 m)	180 lb (82 kg)	Fr	Pine Ridge	North Breston, NS
G	5	Eric Laster	6 ft 6 in (1.98 m)	191 lb (87 kg)	Sr	Polytech	Smyrna, DE
G	11	Sean Tuohy Jr.	6 ft 0 in (1.83 m)	186 lb (84 kg)	Sr	Briarcrest Christian	Memphis, TN
F	13	Franz Rassaman	6 ft 10 in (2.08 m)	230 lb (104 kg)	Sr	Gonzaga College	Washington, D.C.
G	14	Sam Norton (W)	6 ft 2 in (1.88 m)	175 lb (79 kg)	Fr	The Hill School	Collegeville, PA
G	20	Matt Staubi	5 ft 8 in (1.73 m)	152 lb (69 kg)	So	Darien	Rye, NY
F	21	Jarred Jones	6 ft 7 in (2.01 m)	188 lb (85 kg)	Sr	John Carroll	Havre de Grace, MD
F	22	Cam Gregory	6 ft 8 in (2.03 m)	202 lb (92 kg)	So	St. Stephens and St. Agnes	Waldorf, MD
G	23	Tyler Hubbard	6 ft 2 in (1.88 m)	179 lb (81 kg)	Sr	Montrose Christian	Washington, D.C.
G	25	James Fives	6 ft 6 in (1.98 m)	195 lb (88 kg)	Fr	The Hill School	Scranton, PA
F	35	Chancellor Barnard	6 ft 4 in (1.93 m)	187 lb (85 kg)	So	Glenelg Country Day	Columbia, MD
F	42	Josh Forney	6 ft 9 in (2.06 m)	264 lb (120 kg)	Jr	St. Frances	Baltimore, MD

Head coach

- G.G. Smith (Georgia)

Assistant coach(es)

- Keith Booth (Maryland)
- Josh Loeffler (Swarthmore)
- Trevor Quinn (Goucher)

Legend

- (C) Team captain
- (S) Suspended
- (I) Ineligible
- (W) Walk-on
- Injured
- Current redshirt

Roster

== Schedule ==
Date time, TV	Opponent	Result	Record	Site (attendance) city, state
Exhibition
11/05/2015*; 7:30 pm	McGill	W 72–48		Reitz Arena; Baltimore, MD
Non-conference regular season
11/13/2015*; 7:30 pm	Tennessee State	W 86–71	0–1	Reitz Arena (2,100); Baltimore, MD
11/16/2015*; 7:30 pm	LIU Brooklyn	L 68–71	0–2	Reitz Arena (512); Baltimore, MD
11/18/2015*; 7:00 pm	at UMBC	W 76–57	1–2	Retriever Activities Center (1,020); Catonsville, MD
11/21/2015*; 7:00 pm	at St. Bonaventure	L 82–94	1–3	Reilly Center (3,658); Olean, NY
11/24/2015*; 7:30 pm	Stony Brook	L 63–76	1–4	Reitz Arena (318); Baltimore, MD
11/28/2015*; 12:00 pm	at Siena	L 82–90 ^{OT}	1–5	Times Union Center (5,681); Albany, NY
12/01/2015*; 8:00 pm, ESPN3	at No. 4 Kansas	L 61–94	1–6	Allen Fieldhouse (16,300); Lawrence, KS
12/05/2015*; 2:30 pm, MASN	at Mount St. Mary's	L 68–85	1–7	Knott Arena (2,418); Emmitsburg, MD
12/08/2015*; 7:30 pm	Towson	L 54–65	1–8	Reitz Arena (892); Baltimore, MD
12/22/2015*; 7:00 pm	at Fairfield	L 88–94	1–9	Webster Bank Arena (826); Fairfield, CT
12/27/2015*; 8:00 pm, BTN	at Northwestern	L 59–74	1–10	Welsh-Ryan Arena (6,401); Evanston, IL
Patriot League regular season
12/30/2015; 7:30 pm	American	W 75–67	2–10 (1–0)	Reitz Arena (787); Baltimore, MD
01/02/2016; 2:00 pm	at Lafayette	W 81–78	3–10 (2–0)	Kirby Sports Center (1,924); Easton, PA
01/06/2016; 7:30 pm	Lehigh	W 51–50	4–10 (3–0)	Reitz Arena (341); Baltimore, MD
01/09/2016; 7:00 pm	Army	L 59–73	4–11 (3–1)	Reitz Arena (1,042); Baltimore, MD
01/13/2016; 7:00 pm	at Navy	W 52–50	4–12 (3–2)	Alumni Hall (1,698); Annapolis, MD
01/18/2016; 7:30 pm, CBSSN	at Boston University	L 84–87 ^{OT}	4–13 (3–3)	Case Gym (590); Boston, MA
01/20/2016; 7:00 pm, ASN	Bucknell	L 58–67	4–14 (3–4)	Reitz Arena (796); Baltimore, MD
01/27/2016; 7:00 pm	at Holy Cross	W 71–54	5–14 (4–4)	Hart Center (1,646); Worcester, MA
01/30/2016; 7:00 pm	Lafayette	W 84–77	6–14 (5–4)	Reitz Arena (1,036); Baltimore, MD
02/01/2016; 6:00 pm	Colgate; Postponed from 1/24/16	W 68–65	6–15 (5–5)	Reitz Arena (431); Baltimore, MD
02/03/2016; 7:00 pm	at Lehigh	L 66–71	7–15 (6–5)	Stabler Arena (636); Bethlehem, PA
02/06/2016; 7:00 pm	at Army	W 100–99 ^{2OT}	8–15 (7–5)	Christl Arena (1,113); West Point, NY
02/10/2016; 7:00 pm	Navy	L 51–71	8–16 (7–6)	Reitz Arena (637); Baltimore, MD
02/13/2016; 1:00 pm	Boston University	L 65–73	8–17 (7–7)	Reitz Arena (647); Baltimore, MD
02/17/2016; 7:00 pm	at Bucknell	L 52–87	8–18 (7–8)	Sojka Pavilion (2,593); Lewisburg, PA
02/20/2016; 12:00 pm	at Colgate	L 90–93 ^{OT}	8–19 (7–9)	Cotterell Court (943); Hamilton, NY
02/24/2016; 7:30 pm	Holy Cross	W 78–63	9–19 (8–9)	Reitz Arena (602); Baltimore, MD
02/27/2015; 12:00 pm	at American	L 66–67	9–20 (8–10)	Bender Arena (796); Washington, D.C.
Patriot League tournament
03/01/2015; 7:30 pm	Holy Cross; First round	L 67–72	9–21	Reitz Arena (408); Baltimore, MD
*Non-conference game. ^{#}Rankings from AP Poll. (#) Tournament seedings in parentheses. All times are in Eastern Time.
