= 2015–16 Lafayette Leopards men's basketball team =

American college basketball season

2015–16 Lafayette Leopards men's basketball
- Conference: Patriot League
- Record: 6–24 (3–15 Patriot)
- Head coach: Fran O'Hanlon (21st season)
- Assistant coaches: Pat Doherty; Matt Blue; Jimmy Fenerty
- Home arena: Kirby Sports Center

2015–16 Patriot League men's basketball standings
	Conf.				Overall
Team	W		L	PCT	W		L	PCT
Bucknell	14	–	4	.778	17	–	14	.548
Lehigh	13	–	5	.722	17	–	15	.531
Boston University	11	–	7	.611	19	–	15	.559
Army	9	–	9	.500	19	–	14	.576
Navy	9	–	9	.500	19	–	14	.576
Colgate	9	–	9	.500	13	–	17	.433
American	9	–	9	.500	12	–	19	.387
Loyola (MD)	8	–	10	.444	9	–	21	.300
Holy Cross †	5	–	13	.278	15	–	20	.429
Lafayette	3	–	15	.167	6	–	24	.200
† 2016 Patriot League tournament winner

The 2015–16 Lafayette Leopards men's basketball team represented Lafayette College during the 2015–16 NCAA Division I men's basketball season. The Leopards, led by twenty-first year head coach Fran O'Hanlon, played their home games at the Kirby Sports Center and were members of the Patriot League. They finished the season 6–24, 3–15 in Patriot League play to finish in last place. They lost to Navy in the first round of the Patriot League tournament.

== Previous season ==
The Leopards finished the season 20–13, 9–9 in Patriot League play to finish in a tie for fourth place. They defeated Boston University, Bucknell, and American to become champions of the Patriot League tournament. They received an automatic bid to the NCAA tournament where they lost in the second round to Villanova.

== Departures ==
Name	Number	Pos.	Height	Weight	Year	Hometown	Notes
Joey Ptasinsky	5	G	6'3"	177	Senior	Highlands Ranch, CO	Graduated
Seth Hinrichs	12	G	6'8"	223	Senior	Clara City, MN	Graduated
Dan Trist	20	F	6'9"	234	Senior	Sydney, Australia	Graduated
Alan Flannigan	22	F	6'7"	235	Senior	Dexter, MO	Graduated
Michael Hoffman	24	F	6'8"	192	Sophomore	Burleson, TX	Transferred to Texas–Rio Grande Valley
Jake Newman	33	G	6'7"	196	Sophomore	Surrey, BC	Transferred to Carlton

== Incoming recruits ==
College recruiting information
Name	Hometown	School	Height	Weight	Commit date
Paulius Zalys #116 PF	Kaunas, Lithuania	Perkiomen School	6 ft 7 in (2.01 m)	N/A	May 24, 2014
Paulius Zalys #116 PF	Recruit ratings: Scout: Rivals: (57)				
Sam Dunkum; C	Little Rock, AR	North Little Rock High School	6 ft 11 in (2.11 m)	225 lb (102 kg)	Sep 1, 2014
Sam Dunkum; C	Recruit ratings: Scout: Rivals: (NR)				
Tyler Barlow; PF	Corpus Christi, TX	Flour Bluff High School	6 ft 9 in (2.06 m)	192 lb (87 kg)	Sep 1, 2014
Tyler Barlow; PF	Recruit ratings: Scout: Rivals: (NR)				
Auston Evans; SG	Dallas, TX	Greenhill School	6 ft 3 in (1.91 m)	N/A	Sep 30, 2014
Auston Evans; SG	Recruit ratings: Scout: Rivals: (NR)				
Overall recruit ranking:
Note: In many cases, Scout, Rivals, 247Sports, On3, and ESPN may conflict in their listings of height and weight.; In these cases, the average was taken. ESPN grades are on a 100-point scale.; Sources: "2015 Team Ranking". Rivals.

=== 2016 class recruits ===
College recruiting information (2016)
Name	Hometown	School	Height	Weight	Commit date
Kyle Stout #90 SF	Allentown, PA	Parkland High School	6 ft 6 in (1.98 m)	195 lb (88 kg)	May 5, 2015
Kyle Stout #90 SF	Recruit ratings: Scout: Rivals: (60)				
Hunter Janacek; SG	Houston, TX	Scarborough High School	6 ft 4 in (1.93 m)	165 lb (75 kg)	Jul 29, 2015
Hunter Janacek; SG	Recruit ratings: Scout: Rivals: (NR)				
Overall recruit ranking:
Note: In many cases, Scout, Rivals, 247Sports, On3, and ESPN may conflict in their listings of height and weight.; In these cases, the average was taken. ESPN grades are on a 100-point scale.; Sources: "2016 Team Ranking". Rivals.

== Roster ==
2015–16 Lafayette Leopards men's basketball team
Players
Coaches

Pos.	#	Name	Height	Weight	Year	Previous school	Hometown
G	3	Jacob Orender (W)	6 ft 0 in (1.83 m)	176 lb (80 kg)	Fr	Fletcher	Jacksonville Beach, FL
G	4	Eric Stafford	6 ft 5 in (1.96 m)	162 lb (73 kg)	So	Pitman	Pitman, NJ
G	11	Nick Lindner	5 ft 11 in (1.8 m)	172 lb (78 kg)	Jr	Germantown Academy	Doylestown, PA
G	12	Auston Evans	6 ft 6 in (1.98 m)	186 lb (84 kg)	Fr	Greenhill	McKinney, TX
F	13	Matt Klinewski	6 ft 8 in (2.03 m)	234 lb (106 kg)	So	Eastern Regional	Voorhees, NJ
G	14	Bryce Scott	6 ft 2 in (1.88 m)	190 lb (86 kg)	Sr	Oak Ridge	El Dorado Hills, CA
G	21	Zach Rufer	6 ft 2 in (1.88 m)	198 lb (90 kg)	Sr	Burke Catholic	Bloomingburg, NY
F	22	Sam Dunkum	6 ft 10 in (2.08 m)	215 lb (98 kg)	Fr	North Little Rock	North Little Rock, AR
F	24	Tyler Barlow	6 ft 8 in (2.03 m)	192 lb (87 kg)	Fr	Flour Bluff	Corpus Christi, TX
G	32	Monty Boykins	6 ft 5 in (1.96 m)	195 lb (88 kg)	Jr	Lakota West	West Chester, OH
F	33	Paulius Zalys	6 ft 7 in (2.01 m)	202 lb (92 kg)	Fr	The Perkiomen School	Kaunas, Lithuania
F	34	Ben Freeland	6 ft 10 in (2.08 m)	210 lb (95 kg)	Sr	Montgomery/Suffield Academy	Santa Rosa, CA
F	44	Billy Murphy (W)	6 ft 10 in (2.08 m)	227 lb (103 kg)	Sr	Brunswick School	Greenwich, CT
C	54	Nathaniel Musters	6 ft 10 in (2.08 m)	267 lb (121 kg)	Sr	Sydney Tech	Sydney, Australia

Head coach

- Fran O'Hanlon (Villanova)

Assistant coach(es)

- Pat Doherty (Lafayette)
- Matt Blue (St. Lawrence)
- Jimmy Fenerty (Dickinson State)

Legend

- (C) Team captain
- (S) Suspended
- (I) Ineligible
- (W) Walk-on
- Injured
- Current redshirt

Roster

== Schedule ==
Date time, TV	Opponent	Result	Record	Site (attendance) city, state
Non-conference regular season
11/13/2015*; 7:00 PM	at George Washington	L 76–85	0–1	Charles E. Smith Center (3,118); Washington, D.C.
11/15/2015*; 2:00 PM, WBPH	Saint Peter's	W 87–86 ^{OT}	1–1	Kirby Sports Center (1,450); Easton, PA
11/21/2015*; 4:00 PM	at NJIT	L 66–80	1–2	Fleisher Center; Newark, NJ
11/23/2015*; 7:00 PM	at La Salle	L 75–83	1–3	Tom Gola Arena (1,678); Philadelphia, PA
11/25/2015*; 7:00 PM	at Princeton	L 52–104	1–4	Jadwin Gymnasium (1,578); Princeton, NJ
11/29/2015*; 2:00 PM, WBPH	Penn	W 92–86	2–4	Kirby Sports Center (1,573); Easton, PA
12/02/2015*; 7:00 PM	St. Francis Brooklyn	L 62–69	2–5	Kirby Sports Center (1,132); Easton, PA
12/05/2015*; 2:00 PM	at Cornell	L 67–85	2–6	Newman Arena (1,934); Ithaca, NY
12/09/2015*; 7:00 PM	Fairleigh Dickson	L 89–91 ^{OT}	2–7	Kirby Sports Center (1,432); Easton, PA
12/12/2015*; 3:30 PM	at Sacred Heart	W 90–86	3–7	William H. Pitt Center (619); Fairfield, CT
12/23/2015*; 10:00 PM, P12N	at USC	L 64–100	3–8	Galen Center (3,215); Los Angeles, CA
Patriot League regular season
12/30/2015; 7:00 PM	at Colgate	L 70–77	3–9 (0–1)	Cotterell Court (722); Hamilton, NY
01/02/2016; 2:00 PM, WBPH	Loyola (MD)	L 78–81	3–10 (0–2)	Kirby Sports Center (1,924); Easton, PA
01/06/2016; 7:00 PM	at Army	W 76–73	4–10 (1–2)	Christl Arena (443); West Point, NY
01/09/2016; 1:00 PM	at Boston University	L 47–68	4–11 (1–3)	Case Gym (556); Boston, MA
01/13/2016; 7:00 PM, WBPH	Holy Cross	W 65–52	5–11 (2–3)	Kirby Sports Center (1,335); Easton, PA
01/16/2016; 7:00 PM	at Navy	L 61–87	5–12 (2–4)	Alumni Hall (1,813); Annapolis, MD
01/20/2016; 7:00 PM, WBPH	American	L 73–81	5–13 (2–5)	Kirby Sports Center (1,507); Easton, PA
01/25/2016; 7:30 PM, CBSSN	at Bucknell	L 67–79	5–14 (2–6)	Sojka Pavilion (2,640); Lewisburg, PA
01/30/2016; 7:00 PM	at Loyola (MD)	L 77–84	5–15 (2–7)	Reitz Arena (1,036); Baltimore, MD
02/03/2016; 7:00 PM, WBPH	Army	L 81–84 ^{OT}	5–16 (2–8)	Kirby Sports Center (1,554); Easton, PA
02/06/2016; 2:00 PM, WBPH	Boston University	L 82–89 ^{2OT}	5–17 (2–9)	Kirby Sports Center (1,771); Easton, PA
02/08/2016; 7:00 PM	Lehigh; Postponed from 1/23/16	L 72–87	5–18 (2–10)	Kirby Sports Center (1,844); Easton, PA
02/10/2016; 7:05 PM	at Holy Cross	L 53–67	5–19 (2–11)	Hart Center (1,067); Winchester, MA
02/13/2016; 2:00 PM, WBPH	Navy	L 68–74	5–20 (2–12)	Kirby Sports Center (1,932); Easton, PA
02/17/2016; 7:30 PM	at American	L 59–60 ^{OT}	5–21 (2–13)	Bender Arena (675); Washington, D.C.
02/21/2016; 12:00 PM	at Lehigh	L 61–73	5–22 (2–14)	Stabler Arena (1,949); Bethlehem, PA
02/24/2016; 7:00 PM, WBPH	Bucknell	L 83–86	5–23 (2–15)	Kirby Sports Center (1,664); Easton, PA
02/27/2016; 12:00 PM, WBPH	Colgate	W 79–77	6–23 (3–15)	Kirby Sports Center (1,729); Easton, PA
Patriot League tournament
03/01/2016; 7:00 PM	at Navy; First round	L 70–78	6–24	Alumni Hall (687); Annapolis, MD
*Non-conference game. ^{#}Rankings from AP Poll. (#) Tournament seedings in parentheses. All times are in Eastern Time.

== See also ==
- 2015–16 Lafayette Leopards women's basketball team
