= 2015–16 Lehigh Mountain Hawks men's basketball team =

American college basketball season

2015–16 Lehigh Mountain Hawks men's basketball
- Conference: Patriot League
- Record: 17–15 (13–5 Patriot)
- Head coach: Brett Reed (9th season)
- Assistant coaches: Antoni Wyche; Ryan Krueger; Kyle Griffin
- Home arena: Stabler Arena

2015–16 Patriot League men's basketball standings
	Conf.				Overall
Team	W		L	PCT	W		L	PCT
Bucknell	14	–	4	.778	17	–	14	.548
Lehigh	13	–	5	.722	17	–	15	.531
Boston University	11	–	7	.611	19	–	15	.559
Army	9	–	9	.500	19	–	14	.576
Navy	9	–	9	.500	19	–	14	.576
Colgate	9	–	9	.500	13	–	17	.433
American	9	–	9	.500	12	–	19	.387
Loyola (MD)	8	–	10	.444	9	–	21	.300
Holy Cross †	5	–	13	.278	15	–	20	.429
Lafayette	3	–	15	.167	6	–	24	.200
† 2016 Patriot League tournament winner

The 2015–16 Lehigh Mountain Hawks men's basketball team represented Lehigh University during the 2015–16 NCAA Division I men's basketball season. The Mountain Hawks, led by ninth year head coach Brett Reed, played their home games at Stabler Arena and were members of the Patriot League. They finished the season 17–15, 13–5 in Patriot League play to finish in second place. They advanced to the championship game of the Patriot League tournament, where they lost to Holy Cross.

== Previous season ==
The Mountain Hawks finished the season 16–14, 10–8 in Patriot League play to finish in third place. They lost in the quarterfinals of the Patriot League tournament to American.

== Departures ==
Name	Number	Pos.	Height	Weight	Year	Hometown	Notes
Miles Simelton	10	G	6'0"	160	Sophomore	Oswego, IL	Transferred to Lewis
Cole Renninger	13	G	6'3"	185	Sophomore	Lock Haven, PA	Transferred to Lock Haven
Corey Schaefer	15	G	6'1"	175	Senior	Johnston, IA	Graduated
Stefan Cvrkalj	21	G	6'6"	195	Senior	Kitchener, ON	Graduated
Conroy Baltimore	44	F	6'6"	210	Senior	Bronx, NY	Graduated

== Incoming recruits ==
College recruiting information
Name	Hometown	School	Height	Weight	Commit date
Matt Holba #36 SF	Noblesville, IN	Saint Theodore Guerin Catholic	6 ft 7 in (2.01 m)	200 lb (91 kg)	Sep 7, 2014
Matt Holba #36 SF	Recruit ratings: Scout: Rivals: (78)				
Kyle Leufroy #93 SG	La Canada, CA	Prolific Prep	6 ft 2 in (1.88 m)	170 lb (77 kg)	Sep 27, 2014
Kyle Leufroy #93 SG	Recruit ratings: Scout: Rivals: (67)				
Caleb Sedore #96 PF	Pulaski, NY	Pulaski Central School	6 ft 9 in (2.06 m)	215 lb (98 kg)	Oct 17, 2014
Caleb Sedore #96 PF	Recruit ratings: Scout: Rivals: (59)				
Overall recruit ranking:
Note: In many cases, Scout, Rivals, 247Sports, On3, and ESPN may conflict in their listings of height and weight.; In these cases, the average was taken. ESPN grades are on a 100-point scale.; Sources: "2015 Team Ranking". Rivals.

=== 2016 class recruits ===
College recruiting information (2016)
Name	Hometown	School	Height	Weight	Commit date
Pat Andree #60 PF	Colts Neck, NJ	Christian Brothers Academy	6 ft 7 in (2.01 m)	205 lb (93 kg)	Aug 30, 2015
Pat Andree #60 PF	Recruit ratings: Scout: Rivals: (70)				
Jordan Cohen #68 PG	North Hollywood, CA	Campbell Hall High School	5 ft 10 in (1.78 m)	155 lb (70 kg)	Sep 15, 2015
Jordan Cohen #68 PG	Recruit ratings: Scout: Rivals: (66)				
Overall recruit ranking:
Note: In many cases, Scout, Rivals, 247Sports, On3, and ESPN may conflict in their listings of height and weight.; In these cases, the average was taken. ESPN grades are on a 100-point scale.; Sources: "2016 Team Ranking". Rivals.

== Roster ==
2015–16 Lehigh Mountain Hawks men's basketball team
Players
Coaches

Pos.	#	Name	Height	Weight	Year	Previous school	Hometown
G	1	Kahron Ross	5 ft 11 in (1.8 m)	155 lb (70 kg)	So	Jonesboro HS	Jonesboro, AR
G	4	Devon Carter	6 ft 4 in (1.93 m)	195 lb (88 kg)	Sr	John Hay HS	Cleveland, OH
G	5	Austin Price	6 ft 4 in (1.93 m)	175 lb (79 kg)	Jr	Detroit Country Day HS	Indianapolis, IN
G	10	Kyle Leufroy	6 ft 3 in (1.91 m)	195 lb (88 kg)	Fr	Prolific Prep	Pasadena, CA
G	11	Tyler Jenkins	6 ft 1 in (1.85 m)	175 lb (79 kg)	So	Hamilton Southeastern HS	Fishers, IN
F	13	Matt Holba	6 ft 7 in (2.01 m)	200 lb (91 kg)	Fr	Guerin Catholic HS	Noblesville, IN
G	15	Jay Jay Davis	5 ft 10 in (1.78 m)	150 lb (68 kg)	So	William Allen HS	Allentown, PA
G/F	20	John Ross Glover	6 ft 4 in (1.93 m)	195 lb (88 kg)	Sr	University School of Jackson	Hendersonville, TN
G	23	Georgios Pilitsis (W)	6 ft 2 in (1.88 m)	185 lb (84 kg)	Jr	Anatolia College	Thessaloniki, Greece
F	31	Jesse Chuku	6 ft 9 in (2.06 m)	225 lb (102 kg)	Sr	Kimball Union Academy	London, England
F/C	32	Tim Kempton Jr.	6 ft 10 in (2.08 m)	225 lb (102 kg)	Jr	Brophy College Prep	Scottsdale, AZ
F	40	Justin Goldsborough	6 ft 8 in (2.03 m)	210 lb (95 kg)	Sr	St. Stephen's & St. Agnes School	Fort Washington, MD
G	42	Brandon Alston	6 ft 5 in (1.96 m)	195 lb (88 kg)	So	Herndon HS	Vienna, VA
C	55	Caleb Sedore	6 ft 11 in (2.11 m)	215 lb (98 kg)	Fr	Pulaski HS	Pulaski, NY

Head coach

- Brett Reed (Wayne State (MI))

Assistant coach(es)

- Antoni Wyche (Notre Dame)
- Ryan Krueger (Lehigh)
- Kyle Griffin (Siena)

Legend

- (C) Team captain
- (S) Suspended
- (I) Ineligible
- (W) Walk-on
- Injured
- Current redshirt

Roster

== Schedule ==
Date time, TV	Rank^{#}	Opponent^{#}	Result	Record	Site (attendance) city, state
Non-conference regular season
Nov 13*; 7:00 pm, ESPN3		at Syracuse	L 47–57	0–1	Carrier Dome (21,286); Syracuse, NY
Nov 16*; 7:00 pm		at Canisius	L 89–98	0–2	Koessler Athletic Center (1,153); Buffalo, NY
Nov 19*; 7:00 pm		Yale	L 67–79	0–3	Stabler Arena (995); Bethlehem, PA
Nov 22*; 4:00 pm		at Columbia	L 61–88	0–4	Levien Gymnasium (1,011); New York City, NY
Nov 25*; 7:00 pm, ESPN3		at No. 12 Virginia	L 54–80	0–5	John Paul Jones Arena (14,220); Charlottesville, VA
Nov 28*; 7:00 pm, ESPN3		at No. 16 Purdue	L 55–77	0–6	Mackey Arena (12,660); West Lafayette, IN
Dec 2*; 7:00 pm		at Saint Francis (PA)	L 73–84	0–7	DeGol Arena (1,032); Loretto, PA
Dec 5*; 2:00 pm		Rochester College	W 84–50	1–7	Stabler Arena (576); Bethlehem, PA
Dec 17*; 7:00 pm		at Robert Morris	L 67–69	1–8	Charles L. Sewall Center (651); Moon Township, PA
Dec 19*; 7:00 pm		Mount St. Mary's	W 76–73	2–8	Stabler Arena (673); Bethlehem, PA
Dec 22*; 7:00 pm		Stony Brook	L 62–75	2–9	Stabler Arena (543); Bethlehem, PA
Patriot League regular season
Dec 30; 7:00 pm, SE2		Army	L 82–88	2–10 (0–1)	Stabler Arena (1,195); Bethlehem, PA
Jan 2; 2:00 pm, SE2		Boston University	W 81–73	3–10 (1–1)	Stabler Arena (827); Bethlehem, PA
Jan 6; 7:30 pm		at Loyola (MD)	L 50–51	3–11 (1–2)	Reitz Arena (341); Baltimore, MD
Jan 9; 2:00 pm		at American	W 65–50	4–11 (2–2)	Bender Arena (645); Washington, D.C.
Jan 11; 7:30 pm, CBSSN		Bucknell	L 76–82	4–12 (2–3)	Stabler Arena (1,042); Bethlehem, PA
Jan 16; 1:00 pm		at Holy Cross	W 87–66	5–12 (3–3)	Hart Center (1,301); Worcester, MA
Jan 20; 7:00 pm, SE2		Navy	L 64–69	5–13 (3–4)	Stabler Arena (979); Bethlehem, PA
Jan 27; 7:00 pm, SE2		Colgate	W 79–70	6–13 (4–4)	Stabler Arena (872); Bethlehem, PA
Jan 31; 12:00 pm, CBSSN		at Boston University	L 73–75	6–14 (4–5)	Case Gym (821); Boston, MA
Feb 3; 7:00 pm, SE2		Loyola (MD)	W 71–66	7–14 (5–5)	Stabler Arena (636); Bethlehem, PA
Feb 6; 7:00 pm, SE2		American	W 72–49	8–14 (6–5)	Stabler Arena (1,380); Bethlehem, PA
Feb 8; 7:00 pm		at Lafayette; Postponed from Jan 23	W 87–72	9–14 (7–5)	Kirby Sports Center (1,844); Easton, PA
Feb 10; 7:00 pm, ASN		at Bucknell	W 80–65	10–14 (8–5)	Sojka Pavilion (2,523); Lewisburg, PA
Feb 15; 7:30 pm, CBSSN		Holy Cross	W 64–59	11–14 (9–5)	Stabler Arena (710); Bethlehem, PA
Feb 17; 7:00 pm		at Navy	W 77–74	12–14 (10–5)	Alumni Hall (1,068); Annapolis, MD
Feb 21; 12:00 pm, SE2		Lafayette	W 73–61	13–14 (11–5)	Stabler Arena (1,949); Bethlehem, PA
Feb 24; 7:00 pm		at Colgate	W 71–54	14–14 (12–5)	Cotterell Court (1,049); Hamilton, NY
Feb 27; 12:00 pm, CBSSN		at Army	W 82–72	15–14 (13–5)	Christl Arena (2,233); West Point, NY
Patriot League tournament
Mar 3; 7:00 pm	(2)	(7) Navy; Quarterfinals	W 65–63	16–14	Stabler Arena (1,730); Bethlehem, PA
Mar 6; 2:00 pm, CBSSN	(2)	(6) American; Semifinals	W 78–62	17–14	Stabler Arena (2,225); Bethlehem, PA
Mar 9; 7:30 pm, CBSSN	(2)	(9) Holy Cross; Championship game	L 56–59	17–15	Stabler Arena (4,587); Bethlehem, PA
*Non-conference game. ^{#}Rankings from AP Poll. (#) Tournament seedings in parentheses. All times are in Eastern Time.
