= 2015–16 Boston University Terriers men's basketball team =

American college basketball season

2015–16 Boston University Terriers men's basketball

CIT, Second round
- Conference: Patriot League
- Record: 19–15 (11–7 Patriot)
- Head coach: Joe Jones (5th season)
- Assistant coaches: Shaun Morris; Curtis Wilson; Walt Corbean
- Home arena: Case Gym

2015–16 Patriot League men's basketball standings
	Conf.				Overall
Team	W		L	PCT	W		L	PCT
Bucknell	14	–	4	.778	17	–	14	.548
Lehigh	13	–	5	.722	17	–	15	.531
Boston University	11	–	7	.611	19	–	15	.559
Army	9	–	9	.500	19	–	14	.576
Navy	9	–	9	.500	19	–	14	.576
Colgate	9	–	9	.500	13	–	17	.433
American	9	–	9	.500	12	–	19	.387
Loyola (MD)	8	–	10	.444	9	–	21	.300
Holy Cross †	5	–	13	.278	15	–	20	.429
Lafayette	3	–	15	.167	6	–	24	.200
† 2016 Patriot League tournament winner

The 2015–16 Boston University Terriers men's basketball team represented Boston University during the 2015–16 NCAA Division I men's basketball season. The Terriers, led by fifth year head coach Joe Jones, played their home games at Case Gym and were members of the Patriot League. They finished the season 19–15, 11–7 in Patriot League play to finish in third place. They lost in the quarterfinals of the Patriot League tournament to American. They were invited to the CollegeInsider.com Tournament where they defeated Fordham in the first round before losing in the second round to NJIT.

== Previous season ==
The Terriers finished the season 13–17, 9–9 in Patriot League play to finish in a tie for fourth place. They lost in the quarterfinals of the Patriot League tournament to Lafayette.

== Departures ==
Name	Number	Pos.	Height	Weight	Year	Hometown	Notes
Dylan Brossman	25	G	5'9"	160	Senior	Reamstown, PA	Walk-on; graduated

== Incoming recruits ==
College recruiting information
Name	Hometown	School	Height	Weight	Commit date
Kyle Foreman #74 PG	Clyde Hill, WA	Bellevue High School	6 ft 1 in (1.85 m)	155 lb (70 kg)	Oct 5, 2014
Kyle Foreman #74 PG	Recruit ratings: Scout: Rivals: (69)				
Overall recruit ranking:
Note: In many cases, Scout, Rivals, 247Sports, On3, and ESPN may conflict in their listings of height and weight.; In these cases, the average was taken. ESPN grades are on a 100-point scale.; Sources: "2015 Team Ranking". Rivals.

=== 2016 class recruits ===
College recruiting information (2016)
Name	Hometown	School	Height	Weight	Commit date
Tyler Scanlon #77 PF	Chantilly, VA	Westfield High School	6 ft 7 in (2.01 m)	210 lb (95 kg)	Sep 17, 2015
Tyler Scanlon #77 PF	Recruit ratings: Scout: Rivals: (66)				
Overall recruit ranking:
Note: In many cases, Scout, Rivals, 247Sports, On3, and ESPN may conflict in their listings of height and weight.; In these cases, the average was taken. ESPN grades are on a 100-point scale.; Sources: "2016 Team Ranking". Rivals.

== Roster ==
2015–16 Boston University Terriers men's basketball team
Players
Coaches

Pos.	#	Name	Height	Weight	Year	Hometown
G	0	Eric Johnson	6 ft 2 in (1.88 m)	180 lb (82 kg)	So	Martinsville, Virginia
F	1	Nick Havener	6 ft 8 in (2.03 m)	210 lb (95 kg)	So	Sarasota, Florida
G	2	John Papale (C)	6 ft 3 in (1.91 m)	190 lb (86 kg)	Sr	Wallingford, Connecticut
G	3	Eric Fanning	6 ft 5 in (1.96 m)	190 lb (86 kg)	RS Jr	Trenton, New Jersey
G	5	Blaise Mbargorba	6 ft 11 in (2.11 m)	210 lb (95 kg)	RS Jr	Hightstown, New Jersey
G	13	Will Goff	6 ft 3 in (1.91 m)	180 lb (82 kg)	So	Scottsdale, Arizona
F	14	Braiten Madrigal (W)	6 ft 4 in (1.93 m)	180 lb (82 kg)	Jr	Downey, California
G	15	Cheddi Mosely	6 ft 3 in (1.91 m)	175 lb (79 kg)	So	Oceanport, New Jersey
G	20	Cameron Curry (W)	5 ft 9 in (1.75 m)	170 lb (77 kg)	Jr	West Covina, California
G	21	Cedric Hankerson	6 ft 5 in (1.96 m)	190 lb (86 kg)	Jr	Miami, Florida
F	22	Nathan Dieudonne (C)	6 ft 7 in (2.01 m)	225 lb (102 kg)	Sr	Louisville, Kentucky
G	24	Kamali Chambers (W)	5 ft 11 in (1.8 m)	170 lb (77 kg)	Fr	Golden Valley, Minnesota
G	25	Kyle Foreman	6 ft 1 in (1.85 m)	165 lb (75 kg)	Fr	Bellevue, Washington
F	32	Justin Alston (C)	6 ft 8 in (2.03 m)	220 lb (100 kg)	Sr	Washington, D.C.
G	34	Brandon Johnson (W)	6 ft 4 in (1.93 m)	205 lb (93 kg)	Fr	Mount Vernon, New York
F	41	Dylan Haines	7 ft 0 in (2.13 m)	230 lb (104 kg)	Jr	Liverpool, New York

Head coach

- Joe Jones (SUNY–Oswego)

Assistant coach(es)

- Shaun Morris (Lycoming)
- Curtis Wilson (Adelphi)
- Walt Corbean (Northern Kentucky)

Legend

- (C) Team captain
- (S) Suspended
- (I) Ineligible
- (W) Walk-on
- Injured
- Current redshirt

Roster

== Schedule ==
Date time, TV	Rank^{#}	Opponent^{#}	Result	Record	Site (attendance) city, state
Non-conference regular season
11/13/2015*; 7:00 pm		Northeastern	L 84–87 ^{OT}	0–1	Case Gym (1,256); Boston, MA
11/16/2015*; 7:00 pm		Albany; Hoophall Miami Invitational	W 69–64	1–1	Case Gym (502); Boston, MA
11/19/2015*; 7:30 pm, ESPN3		at NJIT; Hoophall Miami Invitational	L 76–90	1–2	Fleisher Center (1,488); Newark, NJ
11/21/2015*; 7:00 pm, ESPN3		at South Florida; Hoophall Miami Invitational	W 78–66	2–2	USF Sun Dome (2,903); Tampa, FL
11/24/2015*; 9:00 pm, SECN		at No. 1 Kentucky; Hoophall Miami Invitational	L 62–82	2–3	Rupp Arena (22,623); Lexington, KY
11/28/2015*; 4:00 pm		at Binghamton	W 75–65	3–3	Binghamton University Events Center (3,528); Vestal, NY
12/02/2015*; 7:00 pm		at Massachusetts	L 69–99	3–4	Mullins Center (3,818); Amherst, MA
12/08/2015*; 7:00 pm		Harvard	L 69–75	3–5	Case Gym (832); Boston, MA
12/10/2015*; 7:00 pm		at UMass Lowell	W 80–60	4–5	Tsongas Center (1,438); Lowell, MA
12/13/2015*; 1:00 pm		at Quinnipiac	W 64–57	5–5	TD Bank Sports Center (1,091); Hamden, CT
12/19/2015*; 2:00 pm, ESPN3		at Canisius	L 68–84	5–6	Koessler Athletic Center (926); Buffalo, NY
12/21/2015*; 7:00 pm		New Hampshire	W 78–74	6–6	Case Gym (377); Boston, MA
12/28/2015*; 3:00 pm		Kean	W 86–53	7–6	Case Gym (333); Boston, MA
Patriot League regular season
12/30/2015; 7:00 pm		at Holy Cross	L 64–80	7–7 (0–1)	Hart Center (2,345); Worcester, MA
01/02/2016; 2:00 pm		at Lehigh	L 73–81	7–8 (0–2)	Stabler Arena (827); Bethlehem, PA
01/06/2016; 7:00 pm		Navy	L 67–83	7–9 (0–3)	Case Gym (346); Boston, MA
01/09/2016; 1:00 pm		Lafayette	W 68–47	8–9 (1–3)	Case Gym (589); Boston, MA
01/13/2016; 7:30 pm		at American	W 61–50	9–9 (2–3)	Bender Arena (1,029); Washington, D.C.
01/18/2016; 7:30 pm, CBSSN		Loyola (MD)	W 87–84 ^{OT}	10–9 (3–3)	Case Gym (590); Boston, MA
01/20/2016; 7:00 pm		at Colgate	L 78–85	10–10 (3–4)	Cotterell Court (795); Hamilton, NY
01/23/2016; 1:00 pm		Bucknell	L 71–74	10–11 (3–5)	Case Gym (791); Boston, MA
01/27/2016; 7:00 pm		Army	W 76–67	11–11 (4–5)	Case Gym (621); Boston, MA
01/31/2016; 12:00 pm, CBSSN		Lehigh	W 75–73	12–11 (5–5)	Case Gym (821); Boston, MA
02/03/2016; 7:00 pm		at Navy	W 83–72	13–11 (6–5)	Alumni Hall (1,264); Annapolis, MD
02/06/2016; 2:00 pm		at Lafayette	W 89–82 ^{OT}	14–11 (7–5)	Kirby Sports Center (1,771); Easton, PA
02/10/2016; 7:00 pm		American	W 71–51	15–11 (8–5)	Case Gym (503); Boston, MA
02/13/2016; 1:00 pm		at Loyola (MD)	W 73–65	16–11 (9–5)	Reitz Arena (647); Baltimore, MD
02/17/2016; 7:00 pm		Colgate	W 71–68	17–11 (10–5)	Case Gym (705); Boston, MA
02/21/2016; 12:00 pm, CBSSN		at Bucknell	L 59–80	17–12 (10–6)	Sojka Pavilion (3,044); Lewisburg, PA
02/23/2016; 7:00 pm, ASN		at Army	L 71–80	17–13 (10–7)	Christl Arena (504); West Point, NY
02/27/2015; 12:00 pm		Holy Cross	W 83–68	18–13 (11–7)	Case Gym (1,237); Boston, MA
Patriot League tournament
03/03/2015; 7:00 pm	(3)	(6) American; Quarterfinals	L 64–69	18–14	Case Gym (731); Boston, MA
CIT
03/16/2015*; 7:00 pm		at Fordham; First round	W 69–66	19–14	Rose Hill Gymnasium (1,264); Bronx, NY
03/21/2015*; 7:30 pm, ESPN3		at NJIT; Second round	L 72–83	19–15	Fleisher Center (1,134); Newark, NJ
*Non-conference game. ^{#}Rankings from AP Poll. (#) Tournament seedings in parentheses. All times are in Eastern Time.
