= 2015–16 Bucknell Bison men's basketball team =

American college basketball season

2015–16 Bucknell Bison men's basketball

Patriot League regular season champions

NIT, First round
- Conference: Patriot League
- Record: 17–14 (14–4 Patriot)
- Head coach: Nathan Davis (1st season)
- Assistant coaches: Paul Harrison; John Griffin; Ryan Ayers
- Home arena: Sojka Pavilion

2015–16 Patriot League men's basketball standings
	Conf.				Overall
Team	W		L	PCT	W		L	PCT
Bucknell	14	–	4	.778	17	–	14	.548
Lehigh	13	–	5	.722	17	–	15	.531
Boston University	11	–	7	.611	19	–	15	.559
Army	9	–	9	.500	19	–	14	.576
Navy	9	–	9	.500	19	–	14	.576
Colgate	9	–	9	.500	13	–	17	.433
American	9	–	9	.500	12	–	19	.387
Loyola (MD)	8	–	10	.444	9	–	21	.300
Holy Cross †	5	–	13	.278	15	–	20	.429
Lafayette	3	–	15	.167	6	–	24	.200
† 2016 Patriot League tournament winner

The 2015–16 Bucknell Bison men's basketball team represented Bucknell University during the 2015–16 NCAA Division I men's basketball season. The Bison, led by first year head coach Nathan Davis, played their home games at Sojka Pavilion, and were members of the Patriot League. They finished the season 17–14, 14–4 in Patriot League play to win the regular season league championship. They lost in the quarterfinals of the Patriot League tournament to Holy Cross. As a regular season champion who failed to win their league tournament, they received an automatic bid to the National Invitation Tournament, where they lost in the first round to Monmouth.

== Previous season ==
The Bison finished the 2014–15 season 19–15, 13–5 in Patriot League play to win the Patriot League regular season championship. They advanced to the semifinals of the Patriot League tournament, where they lost to Lafayette. As a regular season league champion who failed to win their league tournament, they received an automatic bid to the National Invitation Tournament, where they lost in the first round to Temple.

On March 30, head coach Dave Paulson resigned to take the same position at George Mason. He finished at Bucknell with a 10-year record of 134–94. On April 20, the school hired Nathan Davis as head coach.

== Departures ==
Name	Number	Pos.	Height	Weight	Year	Hometown	Reason for departure
Joshea Singleton	1	G	6'3"	205	Senior	Kinston, NC	Graduated
Steven Kasper	3	G	6'3"	192	Senior	Lakeland, TN	Graduated
J. C. Show	12	G	6'2"	185	Freshman	Clarks Summit, PA	Transferred to Binghamton
Cory Starkey	22	F	6'8"	216	Senior	Petoskey, MI	Graduated

== Incoming recruits ==
College recruiting
Name	Hometown	School	Height	Weight	Commit date
Nate Sestina #83 PF	Emporium, PA	Cameron County High School	6 ft 7 in (2.01 m)	235 lb (107 kg)	Aug 6, 2014
Nate Sestina #83 PF	Recruit ratings: Scout: Rivals: (62)				
Kimbal Mackenzie; PG	Oakville, ON	The John Carroll School	6 ft 1 in (1.85 m)	185 lb (84 kg)	Aug 8, 2014
Kimbal Mackenzie; PG	Recruit ratings: Scout: Rivals: (NR)				
Nate Jones; SG	Radford, VA	Radford High School	6 ft 4 in (1.93 m)	185 lb (84 kg)	
Nate Jones; SG	Recruit ratings: Scout: Rivals: (NR)				
Overall recruit ranking:
Note: In many cases, Scout, Rivals, 247Sports, On3, and ESPN may conflict in their listings of height and weight.; In these cases, the average was taken. ESPN grades are on a 100-point scale.; Sources: "2015 Team Ranking". Rivals.

=== 2016 class recruits ===
College recruiting (2016)
Name	Hometown	School	Height	Weight	Commit date
Bruce Moore #77 PF	Randallstown, MD	McDonough High School	6 ft 7 in (2.01 m)	N/A	Sep 15, 2015
Bruce Moore #77 PF	Recruit ratings: Scout: Rivals: (66)				
Ben Robertson; SF	High Point, NC	High Point Christian Academy	6 ft 5 in (1.96 m)	190 lb (86 kg)	Sep 14, 2015
Ben Robertson; SF	Recruit ratings: Scout: Rivals: (NR)				
Overall recruit ranking:
Note: In many cases, Scout, Rivals, 247Sports, On3, and ESPN may conflict in their listings of height and weight.; In these cases, the average was taken. ESPN grades are on a 100-point scale.; Sources: "2016 Team Ranking". Rivals.

== Roster ==
2015–16 Bucknell Bison men's basketball team
Players
Coaches

Pos.	#	Name	Height	Weight	Year	Previous school	Hometown
F	0	D.J. MacLeay	6 ft 7 in (2.01 m)	213 lb (97 kg)	Jr	Reagan	San Antonio, TX
G	1	Kimbal Mackenzie	6 ft 1 in (1.85 m)	185 lb (84 kg)	Fr	John Carroll	Oakville, ON
G	2	Stephen Brown	5 ft 11 in (1.8 m)	165 lb (75 kg)	So	Christ Chapel Academy	Manassas, VA
C	4	Nate Sestina	6 ft 8 in (2.03 m)	235 lb (107 kg)	Fr	Cameron County	Emporuim, PA
G	5	John Azzinaro	5 ft 11 in (1.8 m)	180 lb (82 kg)	Jr	Brennan	San Antonio, TX
G	14	Chris Hass	6 ft 5 in (1.96 m)	184 lb (83 kg)	Sr	Pellston	Pellston, MI
G	15	Nate Jones	6 ft 4 in (1.93 m)	185 lb (84 kg)	Fr	Radford	Radford, VA
C	20	Nana Foulland	6 ft 9 in (2.06 m)	227 lb (103 kg)	So	Berks Catholic	Reading, PA
G	22	Matt O'Reilley	6 ft 3 in (1.91 m)	185 lb (84 kg)	Fr	Prolific Prep Academy	Moraga, CA
F	23	Zach Thomas	6 ft 6 in (1.98 m)	210 lb (95 kg)	So	Oakdale	Ijamesville, MD
F	25	Matt Banas	6 ft 9 in (2.06 m)	205 lb (93 kg)	Sr	Hershey	Hershey, PA
G	32	Ryan Frazier	6 ft 0 in (1.83 m)	190 lb (86 kg)	Sr	Salisbury School	Silver Springs, MD
C	44	Ben Oberfeld	6 ft 9 in (2.06 m)	240 lb (109 kg)	Jr	Eastview	Eagan, MN
F	50	Dom Hoffman	6 ft 7 in (2.01 m)	222 lb (101 kg)	Sr	Gill St. Bernard's	Hawthorne, NJ

Head coach

- Nathan Davis (Randolph–Macon)

Assistant coach(es)

- Paul Harrison (Washington and Lee)
- John Griffin (Bucknell)
- Ryan Ayers (Notre Dame)

Legend

- (C) Team captain
- (S) Suspended
- (I) Ineligible
- (W) Walk-on
- Injured
- Current redshirt

Roster

== Schedule ==
Date time, TV	Rank^{#}	Opponent^{#}	Result	Record	Site (attendance) city, state
Non-conference regular season
11/13/2015*; 7:00 pm		Shenandoah	W 107–61	1–0	Sojka Pavilion (2,577); Lewisburg, PA
11/15/2015*; 1:00 pm, CBSSN		Wake Forest	L 82–90	1–1	Sojka Pavilion (3,247); Lewisburg, PA
11/18/2015*; 7:00 pm		at Robert Morris	W 81–76	2–1	Charles L. Sewall Center (1,602); Moon Township, PA
11/21/2015*; 7:00 pm		at Manhattan	W 80–67	3–1	Draddy Gymnasium (1,810); Riverdale, NY
11/21/2015*; 7:00 pm		Siena	L 81–83 ^{OT}	3–2	Sojka Pavilion (2,295); Lewisburg, PA
11/28/2015*; 1:00 pm		at Penn State	L 58–62	3–3	Bryce Jordan Center (5,097); University Park, PA
12/02/2015*; 7:00 pm		Columbia	L 61–72	3–4	Sojka Pavilion (2,465); Lewisburg, PA
12/05/2015*; 12:00 pm, RSN		at NC State	L 86–99	3–5	PNC Arena (16,378); Raleigh, NC
12/08/2015*; 7:00 pm		at Mount St. Mary's	L 73–81	3–6	Knott Arena (1,789); Emmitsburg, MD
12/22/2015*; 7:00 pm		at Princeton	L 77–89	3–7	Jadwin Gymnasium (2,049); Princeton, NJ
12/27/2015*; 2:00 pm		Fairfield	L 91–101	3–8	Sojka Pavilion (2,313); Lewisburg, PA
Patriot League regular season
12/30/2015; 7:00 pm		Navy	W 88–58	4–8 (1–0)	Sojka Pavilion (2,914); Lewisburg, PA
01/02/2016; 3:00 pm		at Army	W 84–76	5–8 (2–0)	Christl Arena (1,597); West Point, NY
01/06/2016; 7:00 pm		American	W 72–54	6–8 (3–0)	Sojka Pavilion (2,584); Lewisburg, PA
01/09/2016; 2:00 pm		Holy Cross	W 98–71	7–8 (4–0)	Sojka Pavilion (3,111); Lewisburg, PA
01/11/2016; 7:30 pm, CBSSN		at Lehigh	W 82–76	8–8 (5–0)	Stabler Arena (1,042); Bethlehem, PA
01/16/2016; 7:00 pm		Colgate	L 73–84	8–9 (5–1)	Sojka Pavilion (3,137); Lewisburg, PA
01/20/2016; 7:00 pm, ASN		at Loyola (MD)	W 67–58	9–9 (6–1)	Reitz Arena (796); Baltimore, MD
01/23/2016; 1:00 pm		at Boston University	W 74–71	10–9 (7–1)	Case Gym (791); Boston, MA
01/25/2016; 7:30 pm, CBSSN		Lafayette	W 79–67	11–9 (8–1)	Sojka Pavilion (2,640); Lewisburg, PA
01/30/2016; 7:00 pm		Army	W 94–66	12–9 (9–1)	Sojka Pavilion (3,513); Lewisburg, PA
02/03/2016; 7:00 pm		at American	L 55–69	12–10 (9–2)	Bender Arena (759); Washington, D.C.
02/06/2016; 1:00 pm		at Holy Cross	W 77–52	13–10 (10–2)	Hart Center (2,647); Worcester, MA
02/10/2016; 7:00 pm, ASN		Lehigh	L 65–80	13–11 (10–3)	Sojka Pavilion (2,523); Lewisburg, PA
02/13/2016; 2:00 pm		at Colgate	L 81–91	13–12 (10–4)	Cotterell Court (N/A); Hamilton, NY
02/17/2016; 7:00 pm		Loyola (MD)	W 87–52	14–12 (11–4)	Sojka Pavilion (2,493); Lewisburg, PA
02/21/2016; 12:00 pm, CBSSN		Boston University	W 80–59	15–12 (12–4)	Sojka Pavilion (3,044); Lewisburg, PA
02/24/2016; 7:00 pm		at Lafayette	W 86–83 ^{2OT}	16–12 (13–4)	Kirby Sports Center (1,664); Easton, PA
02/27/2016; 4:00 pm		at Navy	W 77–73	17–12 (14–4)	Alumni Hall (2,909); Annapolis, MD
Patriot League tournament
03/03/2016; 7:00 pm		Holy Cross; Quarterfinals	L 72–77 ^{2OT}	17–13	Sojka Pavilion (2,700); Lewisburg, PA
NIT
03/15/16*; 7:30 pm, ESPN3	(8)	at (1) Monmouth; First round – Monmouth Bracket	L 80–90	17–14	Multipurpose Activity Center (2,661); West Long Branch, NJ
*Non-conference game. ^{#}Rankings from AP Poll. (#) Tournament seedings in parentheses. All times are in Eastern Time.
