= 2015–16 American Eagles men's basketball team =

American college basketball season

2015–16 American Eagles men's basketball
- Conference: Patriot League
- Record: 12–19 (9–9 Patriot)
- Head coach: Mike Brennan (3rd season)
- Assistant coaches: Scott Greenman; Matt Wolff; Eddie Jackson
- Home arena: Bender Arena

2015–16 Patriot League men's basketball standings
	Conf.				Overall
Team	W		L	PCT	W		L	PCT
Bucknell	14	–	4	.778	17	–	14	.548
Lehigh	13	–	5	.722	17	–	15	.531
Boston University	11	–	7	.611	19	–	15	.559
Army	9	–	9	.500	19	–	14	.576
Navy	9	–	9	.500	19	–	14	.576
Colgate	9	–	9	.500	13	–	17	.433
American	9	–	9	.500	12	–	19	.387
Loyola (MD)	8	–	10	.444	9	–	21	.300
Holy Cross †	5	–	13	.278	15	–	20	.429
Lafayette	3	–	15	.167	6	–	24	.200
† 2016 Patriot League tournament winner

The 2015–16 American Eagles men's basketball team represented American University during the 2015–16 NCAA Division I men's basketball season. The Eagles, led by third year head coach Mike Brennan, played their home games at Bender Arena and were members of the Patriot League. They finished the season 12–19, 9–9 in Patriot League play to finish in a four-way tie for fourth place. They defeated Boston University in the quarterfinals of the Patriot League tournament to advance the semifinals where they lost to Lehigh.

== Previous season ==
The Eagles finished the season 17–16, 8–10 in Patriot League play to finish in a three-way tie for sixth place. They advanced to the championship game of the Patriot League tournament where they lost to Lafayette.

== Departures ==
Name	Number	Pos.	Height	Weight	Year	Hometown	Notes
Darius Gardner	0	G	5'9"	165	RS Senior	Houston, Texas	Graduated
Kyle Kager	1	F	6'8"	195	Senior	Flower Mound, Texas	Graduated
George Langberg	2	G	6'3"	185	Freshman	Short Hills, New Jersey	Transferred to New York
Justice Montgomery	3	G	5'11"	160	Senior	Orlando, Florida	Graduated
Kevin Panzer	13	F	6'9"	225	RS Senior	Mission Viejo, California	Graduated
John Schoof	22	G	6'5"	205	Senior	Fairfax, Virginia	Graduated
Langdon Neal	25	G	6'0"	165	Sophomore	Chicago, Illinois	Transferred to Trinity
Jonathan Davis	35	F	6'7"	220	RS Junior	Simi Valley, California	Graduate transferred to Cal State Los Angeles

== Incoming recruits ==
College recruiting information
Name	Hometown	School	Height	Weight	Commit date
Delante Jones; SF	Lynchburg, VA	Virginia Episcopal School	6 ft 6 in (1.98 m)	190 lb (86 kg)	Aug 7, 2014
Delante Jones; SF	Recruit ratings: Scout: Rivals: (75)				
James Washington; PG	Norwalk, CA	Price High School	6 ft 1 in (1.85 m)	155 lb (70 kg)	
James Washington; PG	Recruit ratings: Scout: Rivals: (67)				
Lonnie Rivera; PG	Nanuet, NY	Don Bosco High School	6 ft 6 in (1.98 m)	190 lb (86 kg)	Sep 28, 2014
Lonnie Rivera; PG	Recruit ratings: Scout: Rivals: (NR)				
Overall recruit ranking:
Note: In many cases, Scout, Rivals, 247Sports, On3, and ESPN may conflict in their listings of height and weight.; In these cases, the average was taken. ESPN grades are on a 100-point scale.; Sources: "2015 Team Ranking". Rivals.

== Roster ==
2015–16 American Eagles men's basketball team
Players
Coaches

Pos.	#	Name	Height	Weight	Year	Previous school	Hometown
G/F	2	Delante Jones	6 ft 5 in (1.96 m)	195 lb (88 kg)	Fr	Virginia Episcopal	Lynchburg, VA
G	3	James Washington	6 ft 1 in (1.85 m)	160 lb (73 kg)	Fr	Price	Norwalk, CA
G	4	Alex Paquin	6 ft 0 in (1.83 m)	198 lb (90 kg)	So	Champlain College Saint-Lambert	Montreal, QE
F	5	Marko Vasic	6 ft 5 in (1.96 m)	200 lb (91 kg)	Sr	Aim High Prep	Belgrade, Serbia
F	12	Yilret Yiljep	6 ft 7 in (2.01 m)	235 lb (107 kg)	RS So	Westtown	Kaduna, Nigeria
F	13	Leon Tolksdorf	6 ft 8 in (2.03 m)	225 lb (102 kg)	RS Jr	Leibniz-Berschule Berlin Secondary; Connecticut	Berlin, Germany
G	14	Jesse Reed	6 ft 5 in (1.96 m)	185 lb (84 kg)	Sr	The Kiski School	Saltsburg, PA
F	15	Lonnie Rivera	6 ft 6 in (1.98 m)	195 lb (88 kg)	Fr	Don Bosco Prep	Spring Valley, NY
G/F	20	Charlie Jones (W)	6 ft 4 in (1.93 m)	185 lb (84 kg)	Jr	Mount St. Joseph	Manchester, MD
G	21	Jalen Rhea	6 ft 2 in (1.88 m)	205 lb (93 kg)	So	New Albany	New Albany, OH
G	25	Kevin Brown	5 ft 8 in (1.73 m)	160 lb (73 kg)	Fr	Montclair Kimberley Academy	West Orange, NJ
C	34	Gabe Brown	7 ft 0 in (2.13 m)	230 lb (104 kg)	So	Ward Melville	Berlin, Germany
C	35	Andrija Matić	6 ft 10 in (2.08 m)	220 lb (100 kg)	Fr	German School of Belgrade	Belgrade, Serbia
F/C	42	Paris Maragkos	6 ft 9 in (2.06 m)	243 lb (110 kg)	RS Jr	Blue Ridge; George Washington	Marousi, Greece

Head coach

- Mike Brennan (Princeton)

Assistant coach(es)

- Scott Greenman (Princeton)
- Matt Wolff (Boston University)
- Eddie Jackson

Legend

- (C) Team captain
- (S) Suspended
- (I) Ineligible
- (W) Walk-on
- Injured
- Current redshirt

Roster

== Schedule ==
Date time, TV	Opponent	Result	Record	Site (attendance) city, state
Non-conference regular season
11/13/2015*; 8:00 pm	at Rhode Island	L 42–65	0–1	Ryan Center (5,089); Kingston, RI
11/17/2015*; 7:30 pm	Hampton	L 48–61	0–2	Bender Arena (1,224); Washington, D.C.
11/21/2015*; 7:00 pm	at Saint Francis (PA)	L 48–68	0–3	DeGol Arena (1,072); Loretto, PA
11/25/2015*; 7:00 pm	at VCU	L 44–72	0–4	Siegel Center (7,637); Richmond, VA
11/28/2015*; 1:00 pm	at New Hampshire	W 68–50	1–4	Lundholm Gym (473); Durham, NH
12/01/2015*; 7:00 pm	at Mount St. Mary's	L 56–81	1–5	Knott Arena (1,504); Emmitsburg, MD
12/04/2015*; 7:05 pm, ESPN3	at Youngstown State	W 60–56	2–5	Beeghly Center (1,296); Youngstown, OH
12/06/2015*; 2:00 pm	at Wagner	L 48–55	2–6	Spiro Sports Center (1,192); Staten Island, NY
12/17/2015*; 7:30 pm	Stony Brook	L 68–86	2–7	Bender Arena (368); Washington, D.C.
12/20/2015*; 1:30 pm, CSNMA	Maryland Eastern Shore	L 64–79	2–8	Bender Arena (826); Washington, D.C.
12/22/2015*; 8:00 pm, SECN	at LSU	L 51–79	2–9	Maravich Center (9,902); Baron Rouge, LA
Patriot League regular season
12/30/2015; 7:38 pm, Patriot League Network	at Loyola (MD)	L 67–75	2–10 (0–1)	Reitz Arena (787); Baltimore, MD
01/03/2016; 2:00 pm, Patriot League Network	Colgate	L 37–56	2–11 (0–2)	Bender Arena (489); Washington, D.C.
01/06/2016; 7:00 pm, Patriot League Network	at Bucknell	L 54–72	2–12 (0–3)	Sojka Pavilion (2584); Lewisburg, PA
01/09/2016; 2:00 pm, CSNMA	Lehigh	L 50–65	2–13 (0–4)	Bender Arena (645); Washington, D.C.
01/13/2016; 7:00 pm	Boston University	L 50–61	2–14 (0–5)	Bender Arena (1,029); Washington, D.C.
01/17/2016; 12:00 pm, CBSSN	at Army	L 45–65	2–15 (0–6)	Christl Arena (912); West Point, NY
01/20/2016; 7:00 pm, WBPH	at Lafayette	W 81–73	3–15 (1–6)	Kirby Sports Center (1,507); Easton, PA
01/27/2016; 7:00 pm	at Navy	W 63–58	4–15 (2–6)	Alumni Hall (1,642); Annapolis, MD
01/30/2016; 2:00 pm	at Colgate	W 54–49	5–15 (3–6)	Cotterell Court (784); Hamilton, NY
02/01/2016; 7:30 pm	Holy Cross; Postponed from 1/24/16	W 58–45	6–15 (4–6)	Bender Arena (457); Washington, D.C.
02/03/2016; 7:30 pm	Bucknell	W 69–55	7–15 (5–6)	Bender Arena (759); Washington, D.C.
02/06/2016; 2:00 pm	at Lehigh	L 49–72	7–16 (5–7)	Stabler Arena (1,380); Bethlehem, PA
02/10/2016; 7:00 pm	at Boston University	L 51–71	7–17 (5–8)	Case Gym (503); Boston, MA
02/13/2016; 4:00 pm, CSNMA	Army	L 59–65	7–18 (5–9)	Bender Arena (1,342); Washington, D.C.
02/17/2016; 7:30 pm, CSNMA	Lafayette	W 60–59 ^{OT}	8–18 (6–9)	Bender Arena (675); Washington, D.C.
02/21/2016; 12:00 pm	at Holy Cross	W 71–70 ^{OT}	9–18 (7–9)	Hart Center (1,909); Worcester, MA
02/24/2016; 7:30 pm	Navy	W 72–65	10–18 (8–9)	Bender Arena (653); Washington, D.C.
02/27/2016; 12:00 pm	Loyola (MD)	W 67–66	11–18 (9–9)	Bender Arena (796); Washington, D.C.
Patriot League tournament
03/03/2015; 7:00 pm	at Boston University; Quarterfinals	W 69–64	12–18	Case Gym (731); Boston, MA
03/06/2015; 2:00 pm, CBSSN	at Lehigh; Semifinals	L 62–78	12–19	Stabler Arena (2,225); Bethlehem, PA
*Non-conference game. ^{#}Rankings from AP poll. (#) Tournament seedings in parentheses. All times are in Eastern Time.

== See also ==
2015–16 American Eagles women's basketball team
