= 2015–16 Colgate Raiders men's basketball team =

American college basketball season

2015–16 Colgate Raiders men's basketball
- Conference: Patriot League
- Record: 13–17 (9–9 Patriot)
- Head coach: Matt Langel (5th season)
- Assistant coaches: Dave Klatsky; Michael McGarvey; Michael-Hakim Jordan
- Home arena: Cotterell Court

2015–16 Patriot League men's basketball standings
	Conf.				Overall
Team	W		L	PCT	W		L	PCT
Bucknell	14	–	4	.778	17	–	14	.548
Lehigh	13	–	5	.722	17	–	15	.531
Boston University	11	–	7	.611	19	–	15	.559
Army	9	–	9	.500	19	–	14	.576
Navy	9	–	9	.500	19	–	14	.576
Colgate	9	–	9	.500	13	–	17	.433
American	9	–	9	.500	12	–	19	.387
Loyola (MD)	8	–	10	.444	9	–	21	.300
Holy Cross †	5	–	13	.278	15	–	20	.429
Lafayette	3	–	15	.167	6	–	24	.200
† 2016 Patriot League tournament winner

The 2015–16 Colgate Raiders men's basketball team represented Colgate University during the 2015–16 NCAA Division I men's basketball season. The Raiders, led by fifth year head coach Matt Langel, played their home games at Cotterell Court and were members of the Patriot League. They finished the season 13–17, 9–9 in Patriot League play to finish in four way tie for fourth place. They lost in the quarterfinals of the Patriot League tournament to Army.

== Previous season ==
The Raiders finished the season 16–17, 12–6 in Patriot League play to finish in second place. They defeated Navy to advance to the semifinals of the Patriot League tournament where they lost to American.

== Departures ==
Name	Number	Pos.	Height	Weight	Year	Hometown	Notes
Anthony DeRiggs	0	G	5'8"	160	Senior	Brooklyn, NY	Graduated
Wyatt Hagerty	3	C	6'11"	256	Sophomore	Bethel Park, PA	Left the team for personal reasons
Luke Roh	4	G	6'4"	195	Senior	Scottsdale, AZ	Graduated
Pat Moore	5	G	6'5"	200	RS Senior	Whitesboro, NY	Graduated
Jack Fleming	21	F	6'6"	205	Sophomore	Tampa, FL	Transferred to Rollins
Matt McMullen	22	F	6'6"	220	Senior	Brick, NJ	Graduated
Damon Sherman-Newmsome	25	G	6'5"	205	Senior	Anchorage, AK	Graduated
Nic Lane	33	G	6'0"	175	Senior	Seattle, WA	Graduated
John Fenton	34	C	6'9"	240	Sophomore	Modesto, CA	Left the team for personal reasons
Ethan Jacobs	53	C	6'11"	235	RS Senior	Tipton, IN	Graduated

== Incoming recruits ==
College recruiting information
Name	Hometown	School	Height	Weight	Commit date
David Krmpotich #83 PF	Conshohocken, PA	La Salle College High School	6 ft 7 in (2.01 m)	N/A	Nov 7, 2014
David Krmpotich #83 PF	Recruit ratings: Scout: Rivals: (62)				
Dave Maynard #118 SG	Herriman, UT	Herriman High School	6 ft 4 in (1.93 m)	185 lb (84 kg)	Feb 13, 2015
Dave Maynard #118 SG	Recruit ratings: Scout: Rivals: (60)				
Sam Lindgren #119 PF	Doylestown, PA	Germantown Academy	6 ft 6 in (1.98 m)	200 lb (91 kg)	Oct 23, 2014
Sam Lindgren #119 PF	Recruit ratings: Scout: Rivals: (56)				
Dana Batt; PF	Fort Wayne, IN	Homestead High School	6 ft 9 in (2.06 m)	210 lb (95 kg)	Sep 8, 2014
Dana Batt; PF	Recruit ratings: Scout: Rivals: (NR)				
Malcolm Regisford; PF	Burbank, CA	Kent School	6 ft 8 in (2.03 m)	225 lb (102 kg)	Apr 22, 2015
Malcolm Regisford; PF	Recruit ratings: Scout: Rivals: (NR)				
Overall recruit ranking:
Note: In many cases, Scout, Rivals, 247Sports, On3, and ESPN may conflict in their listings of height and weight.; In these cases, the average was taken. ESPN grades are on a 100-point scale.; Sources: "2015 Team Ranking". Rivals.

=== 2016 class recruits ===
College recruiting information (2016)
Name	Hometown	School	Height	Weight	Commit date
Will Rayman #92 PF	New York, NY	New Hampton School	6 ft 7 in (2.01 m)	190 lb (86 kg)	Jun 29, 2015
Will Rayman #92 PF	Recruit ratings: Scout: Rivals: (60)				
Overall recruit ranking:
Note: In many cases, Scout, Rivals, 247Sports, On3, and ESPN may conflict in their listings of height and weight.; In these cases, the average was taken. ESPN grades are on a 100-point scale.; Sources: "2016 Team Ranking". Rivals.

== Roster ==
2015–16 Colgate Raiders men's basketball team
Players
Coaches

Pos.	#	Name	Height	Weight	Year	Previous school	Hometown
G	0	Sean O'Brien	6 ft 2 in (1.88 m)	188 lb (85 kg)	So	Penn Charter	Lafayette Hill, PA
G	1	Austin Tillotson	6 ft 0 in (1.83 m)	175 lb (79 kg)	Sr	Eastern York	York, PA
G	2	Nathan Harries	6 ft 2 in (1.88 m)	180 lb (82 kg)	Jr	Centennial	Alpharetta, PA
G	3	David Favorite	6 ft 3 in (1.91 m)	200 lb (91 kg)	Fr	Alamo Heights	San Antonio, TX
F	4	Sam Lindgren (W)	6 ft 6 in (1.98 m)	210 lb (95 kg)	Fr	Germantown Academy	Doylestown, PA
F/C	5	Malcolm Regisford	6 ft 8 in (2.03 m)	220 lb (100 kg)	Fr	Bellarmine-Jefferson	Woodland Hills, CA
G	10	Alex Ramon	6 ft 1 in (1.85 m)	196 lb (89 kg)	Sr	Wilbraham and Monson Academy	Vitoria-Gasteiz, Spain
C	12	Dana Batt	6 ft 9 in (2.06 m)	215 lb (98 kg)	Fr	Homestead	Fort Wayne, IN
G	13	Andrew Bargmann (W)	6 ft 3 in (1.91 m)	180 lb (82 kg)	Jr	Malvern Prep	Downingtown, PA
F	14	Tom Rivard (W)	6 ft 7 in (2.01 m)	200 lb (91 kg)	So	Worcester Academy	Worcester, MA
F	15	Jordan Swopshire	6 ft 6 in (1.98 m)	210 lb (95 kg)	So	Fort Zumwalt South	O'Fallon, MO
F	22	Dave Krmpotich	6 ft 7 in (2.01 m)	180 lb (82 kg)	So	La Salle	Conshohocken, PA
G	25	Jordan Robertson	6 ft 3 in (1.91 m)	185 lb (84 kg)	So	Wildwood Catholic	Cape May Court House, NJ
G	30	Francisco Amiel	6 ft 2 in (1.88 m)	172 lb (78 kg)	Fr	Escola Secundaria Professor Ruy Luis Gomes	Corroios, Portugal

Head coach

- Matt Langel (Penn)

Assistant coach(es)

- Dave Klatsky (Penn)
- Michael McGarvey (Ursinus)
- Michael-Hakim Jordan (Penn)

Legend

- (C) Team captain
- (S) Suspended
- (I) Ineligible
- (W) Walk-on
- Injured
- Current redshirt

Roster

== Schedule ==
Date time, TV	Opponent	Result	Record	Site (attendance) city, state
Exhibition
12/19/2015*; 2:00 pm	Keuka	W 90–40		Cotterell Court (480); Hamilton, NY
Non-conference regular season
11/13/2015*; 7:00 pm	at George Mason	W 66–53	1–0	EagleBank Arena (5,124); Fairfax, VA
11/16/2015*; 7:00 pm	Cornell	L 98–101 ^{2OT}	1–1	Cotterell Court (814); Hamilton, NY
11/19/2015*; 7:00 pm	at Albany	L 67–88	1–2	SEFCU Arena (3,711); Albany, NY
11/24/2015*; 8:00 pm	at Fordham	L 58–84	1–3	Rose Hill Gymnasium (1,538); Bronx, NY
11/28/2015*; 1:00 pm	at UMBC	W 71–63	2–3	Retriever Activities Center (590); Catsonsville, MD
12/01/2015*; 7:00 pm	at Binghamton	L 50–69	2–4	Binghamton University Events Center (1,714); Vesta, NY
12/05/2015*; 8:00 pm	at TCU	L 49–76	2–5	University Recreation Center (4,296); Fort Worth, TX
12/08/2015*; 7:00 pm, ESPNU	at Syracuse	L 51–78	2–6	Carrier Dome (21,201); Syracuse, NY
12/10/2015*; 7:00 pm	Utica	W 90–68	3–6	Cotterell Court (488); Hamilton, NY
12/13/2015*; 12:00 pm	New Hampshire	W 75–59	4–6	Cotterell Court (582); Hamilton, NY
12/23/2015*; 7:00 pm, ESPN3	at Georgia Tech	L 60–76	4–7	Hank McCamish Pavilion (4,638); Atlanta, GA
Patriot League regular season
12/30/2015; 7:00 pm	Lafayette	W 77–70	5–7 (1–0)	Cotterell Court (722); Hamilton, NY
01/03/2016; 2:00 pm	at American	W 56–37	6–7 (2–0)	Bender Arena (489); Washington, D.C.
01/06/2016; 7:00 pm	at Holy Cross	L 63–65	6–8 (2–1)	Hart Center (1,256); Worcester, MA
01/09/2016; 7:00 pm	Navy	L 68–71 ^{OT}	6–9 (2–2)	Cotterell Court (859); Hamilton, NY
01/13/2016; 2:00 pm	Army	W 80–66	7–9 (3–2)	Cotterell Court (720); Hamilton, NY
01/16/2016; 7:00 pm	at Bucknell	W 84–73	8–9 (4–2)	Sojka Pavilion (3,137); Lewisburg, PA
01/20/2016; 7:00 pm	Boston University	W 85–78	9–9 (5–2)	Cotterell Court (795); Hamilton, NY
01/24/2016; 2:00 pm	Holy Cross; Moved up from 2/3/16	W 76–61	10–9 (6–2)	Cotterell Court (674); Hamilton, NY
01/27/2016; 7:00 pm	at Lehigh	L 70–79	10–10 (6–3)	Stabler Arena (872); Bethlehem, PA
01/30/2016; 2:00 pm	American	L 49–54	10–11 (6–4)	Cotterell Court (784); Hamilton, NY
02/01/2016; 6:00 pm	at Loyola (MD); Postponed from 1/24/16	L 65–68	10–12 (6–5)	Reitz Arena (431); Baltimore, MD
02/06/2016; 4:00 pm	at Navy	W 58–55	11–12 (7–5)	Alumni Hall (1,927); Annapolis, MD
02/08/2016; 7:30 pm, CBSSN	at Army	L 72–82	11–13 (7–6)	Christl Arena (486); West Point, NY
02/13/2016; 2:00 pm	Bucknell	W 91–81	12–13 (8–6)	Cotterell Court (1,063); Hamilton, NY
02/17/2016; 7:00 pm	at Boston University	L 68–71	12–14 (8–7)	Case Gym (705); Boston, MA
02/21/2016; 12:00 pm	Loyola (MD)	W 93–90 ^{OT}	13–14 (9–7)	Cotterell Court (943); Hamilton, NY
02/24/2016; 7:00 pm, TWCSC	Lehigh	L 54–71	13–15 (9–8)	Cotterell Court (1,049); Hamilton, NY
02/27/2016; 12:00 pm	at Lafayette	L 77–79	13–16 (9–9)	Kirby Sports Center (1,729); Easton, PA
Patriot League tournament
03/03/2016; 7:00 pm	at Army; Quarterfinals	L 72–79	13–17	Christl Arena (482); West Point, NY
*Non-conference game. ^{#}Rankings from AP Poll. (#) Tournament seedings in parentheses. All times are in Eastern Time.
