= 2015–16 Army Black Knights men's basketball team =

American college basketball season

2015–16 Army Black Knights men's basketball

CIT, first round
- Conference: Patriot League
- Record: 19–14 (9–9 Patriot)
- Head coach: Zach Spiker (7th season)
- Assistant coaches: Jimmy Allen; Justin Jennings; Brandon Linton; Drew Adams
- Home arena: Christl Arena

2015–16 Patriot League men's basketball standings
	Conf.				Overall
Team	W		L	PCT	W		L	PCT
Bucknell	14	–	4	.778	17	–	14	.548
Lehigh	13	–	5	.722	17	–	15	.531
Boston University	11	–	7	.611	19	–	15	.559
Army	9	–	9	.500	19	–	14	.576
Navy	9	–	9	.500	19	–	14	.576
Colgate	9	–	9	.500	13	–	17	.433
American	9	–	9	.500	12	–	19	.387
Loyola (MD)	8	–	10	.444	9	–	21	.300
Holy Cross †	5	–	13	.278	15	–	20	.429
Lafayette	3	–	15	.167	6	–	24	.200
† 2016 Patriot League tournament winner

The 2015–16 Army Black Knights men's basketball team represented the United States Military Academy during the 2015–16 NCAA Division I men's basketball season. The Black Knights, led by seventh-year head coach Zach Spiker, played their home games at Christl Arena in West Point, New York and were members of the Patriot League. They finished the season 19–14, 9–9 in Patriot League play, to finish in a four-way tie for fourth place. They defeated Colgate in the quarterfinals of the Patriot League tournament to advance to the semifinals where they lost to Holy Cross. They were invited to the CollegeInsider.com Tournament, where they lost in the first round at NJIT.

The season was notable for swingman Kyle Wilson passing the 2,000-point mark for his career, making him the fourth player in Academy history and the sixth in Patriot League history to do so.

On March 25, 2016, Zach Spiker resigned as head coach to accept the head coaching position at Drexel. He finished with a seven-year record of 102–112. On April 6, the school hired Jimmy Allen as head coach.

== Previous season ==
The Black Knights finished the 2015–16 season 15–15, 6–12 in Patriot League play, to finish in last place. They lost in the first round of the Patriot League tournament to Navy.

== Departures ==
Name	Number	Pos.	Height	Weight	Year	Hometown	Notes
Mo Williams	2	G	6' 1"	185	Senior	Fairfax, VA	Graduated
Shane Smith	4	G	6' 4"	190	Sophomore	Norcross, GA	No longer on team roster
Milton Washington	5	G	6' 0"	180	Senior	Houston, TX	Graduated
David Hellstrom	12	G	6' 4"	185	Sophomore	Rockford, IL	No longer on team roster
Sean Billerman	30	G/F	6' 4"	195	Senior	Raleigh, NC	Graduated
Kyle Weldon	34	C	6' 9"	195	Junior	Clarksville, TN	Left team for personal reasons
Zack Johnson	45	F	6' 5"	210	Sophomore	Suffolk, VA	Transferred
Tanner Omlid	55	F	6' 3"	215	Sophomore	Monmouth, OR	Transferred to Western Oregon

== Incoming recruits ==
College recruiting information
Name	Hometown	School	Height	Weight	Commit date
Kevin Olsen #128 PG	Villa Park, CA	Villa Park High School	5 ft 11 in (1.80 m)	165 lb (75 kg)	Jul 21, 2026
Kevin Olsen #128 PG	Recruit ratings: Scout: Rivals: (58)				
Gunther Klimes; SF	Bellevue, WA	Bellevue High School	6 ft 6 in (1.98 m)	N/A	Aug 6, 2026
Gunther Klimes; SF	Recruit ratings: Scout: Rivals: (NR)				
Dylan Hamlin; C	Wausau, WI	East High School	6 ft 11 in (2.11 m)	230 lb (100 kg)	Sep 2, 2026
Dylan Hamlin; C	Recruit ratings: Scout: Rivals: (NR)				
Will Culliton; SG	Plymouth, MN	Breck School	6 ft 3 in (1.91 m)	N/A	Sep 2, 2026
Will Culliton; SG	Recruit ratings: Scout: Rivals: (NR)				
John Miller; PF	Columbus, OH	New Albany High School	6 ft 9 in (2.06 m)	215 lb (98 kg)	Oct 5, 2026
John Miller; PF	Recruit ratings: Scout: Rivals: (NR)				
Overall recruit ranking:
Note: In many cases, Scout, Rivals, 247Sports, On3, and ESPN may conflict in their listings of height and weight.; In these cases, the average was taken. ESPN grades are on a 100-point scale.; Sources: "2015 Team Ranking". Rivals.

=== 2016 class recruits ===
College recruiting information (2016)
Name	Hometown	School	Height	Weight	Commit date
Tommy Funk #102 PG	Warminster, PA	Archbishop Wood High School	6 ft 0 in (1.83 m)	165 lb (75 kg)	Aug 10, 2026
Tommy Funk #102 PG	Recruit ratings: Scout: Rivals: (58)				
Mike Janowski #107 PG	Arlington, VA	St. Stephen's & St. Agnes School	6 ft 3 in (1.91 m)	N/A	
Mike Janowski #107 PG	Recruit ratings: Scout: Rivals: (57)				
Spencer Schultz; SG	Clear Spring, MD	Clear Spring High School	6 ft 6 in (1.98 m)	170 lb (77 kg)	
Spencer Schultz; SG	Recruit ratings: Scout: Rivals: (NR)				
Overall recruit ranking:
Note: In many cases, Scout, Rivals, 247Sports, On3, and ESPN may conflict in their listings of height and weight.; In these cases, the average was taken. ESPN grades are on a 100-point scale.; Sources: "2016 Team Ranking". Rivals.

== Roster ==
2015–16 Army Black Knights men's basketball team
Players
Coaches

Pos.	#	Name	Height	Weight	Year	Previous school	Hometown
G	0	Maxwell Lenox	6 ft 0 in (1.83 m)	200 lb (91 kg)	Sr	WT Woodson	Fairfax, VA
G	1	Richard Brown	6 ft 6 in (1.98 m)	215 lb (98 kg)	Jr	Davidson Day School	Charlotte, NC
G	2	Cayne Edwards	6 ft 4 in (1.93 m)	220 lb (100 kg)	RS Fr	Samuel Clemens	Schertz, TX
G	3	Scott Mammel	5 ft 11 in (1.8 m)	178 lb (81 kg)	Jr	Winston Churchill	San Antonio, TX
F	4	Daniel Andrews	6 ft 7 in (2.01 m)	205 lb (93 kg)	Jr	Punahou School	Honolulu, HI
G	5	Ben Mammel	6 ft 0 in (1.83 m)	183 lb (83 kg)	Fr	Winston Churchill	San Antonio, TX
F	10	Kennedy Edwards	6 ft 6 in (1.98 m)	215 lb (98 kg)	Jr	Notre Dame	Northridge, CA
G	11	Dylan Cox	6 ft 4 in (1.93 m)	190 lb (86 kg)	Sr	Cedar Park	Cedar Park, TX
G/F	15	Jacob Kessler	6 ft 4 in (1.93 m)	190 lb (86 kg)	So	Mills E. Godwin	Richmond, VA
F	20	Mac Hoffman	6 ft 8 in (2.03 m)	210 lb (95 kg)	Jr	De La Salle	Pleasanton, CA
G/F	21	Kyle Wilson	6 ft 4 in (1.93 m)	205 lb (93 kg)	Sr	Trabuco Hills	Mission Viejo, CA
G	24	Jason Houle	6 ft 5 in (1.96 m)	207 lb (94 kg)	Fr	Father Gabriel Richard	Plymouth, MI
F	25	Luke Morrison	6 ft 6 in (1.98 m)	218 lb (99 kg)	So	Northside Christian Academy	Charlotte, NC
G	30	Jordan Fox	6 ft 1 in (1.85 m)	184 lb (83 kg)	Fr	Jackson County	Jackson County, KY
C	31	Kevin Ferguson	6 ft 10 in (2.08 m)	200 lb (91 kg)	Sr	Governor Livingston	Berkeley Heights, NJ
F	32	Tanner Plomb	6 ft 7 in (2.01 m)	205 lb (93 kg)	Sr	East Troy	Mukwonago, WI
F	33	Larry Toomey	6 ft 6 in (1.98 m)	209 lb (95 kg)	Sr	Parkway West	St. Louis, MO
C	34	John Miller	6 ft 9 in (2.06 m)	225 lb (102 kg)	Fr	New Albany	New Albany, OH
G	35	Nathan Dodge	6 ft 2 in (1.88 m)	205 lb (93 kg)	So	East Troy	East Troy, WI
F/C	40	Austin Williamson	6 ft 8 in (2.03 m)	224 lb (102 kg)	Jr	First Baptist Academy	Naples, FL
F/C	43	Travis Rollo	6 ft 7 in (2.01 m)	205 lb (93 kg)	Sr	Mayer Lutheran	Mayer, MN
F	44	Mark Pollack	6 ft 6 in (1.98 m)	218 lb (99 kg)	So	Charlotte Catholic	Charlotte, NC
F	45	Adam Roe	6 ft 5 in (1.96 m)	210 lb (95 kg)	Fr	West Platte	Weston, MO
F	51	Parker Fennema	6 ft 6 in (1.98 m)	215 lb (98 kg)	Fr	Sanderson	Raleigh, NC
G/F	52	John Emezie	6 ft 6 in (1.98 m)	215 lb (98 kg)	Fr	Marvin Ridge	Waxhaw, NC

Head coach

- Zach Spiker (Ithaca)

Assistant coach(es)

- Jimmy Allen (Emory & Henry)
- Justin Jennings (Penn State)
- Brandon Linton (Clarkson)
- Drew Adams (Chicago)

Legend

- (C) Team captain
- (S) Suspended
- (I) Ineligible
- (W) Walk-on
- Injured
- Current redshirt

Roster
Last update: October 6, 2024

== Schedule ==
Date time, TV	Opponent	Result	Record	Site (attendance) city, state
Non-conference regular season
November 13, 2015*; 5:00 p.m.	Ferrum	W 93–54	1–0	Christl Arena (993); West Point, NY
November 15, 2015*; 2:00 p.m.	at Binghamton	W 75–60	2–0	Binghamton University Events Center (2,550); Vestal, NY
November 18, 2015*; 7:00 p.m.	at Fairleigh Dickinson	W 96–85	3–0	Rothman Center (638); Teaneck, NJ
November 22, 2015*; 7:30 p.m.	at George Washington; Barclays Center Classic	L 81–92	3–1	Charles E. Smith Center (2,775); Washington, D.C.
November 24, 2015*; 7:00 p.m., SECN	at Tennessee; Barclays Center Classic	L 80–95	3–2	Thompson–Boling Arena (13,326); Knoxville, TN
November 27, 2015*; 7:30 p.m.	Arkansas–Pine Bluff; Barclays Center Classic	W 81–60	4–2	Christl Arena (885); West Point, NY
November 28, 2015*; 7:30 p.m.	Gardner–Webb; Barclays Center Classic	W 103–98 ^{OT}	5–2	Christl Arena (588); West Point, NY
December 2, 2015*; 7:00 p.m.	at Maine	W 84–71	6–2	Cross Insurance Center (1,192); Bangor, ME
December 8, 2015*; 7:00 p.m.	at Bryant	W 77–55	7–2	Chace Athletic Center (294); Smithfield, RI
December 12, 2015*; 4:00 p.m.	at Air Force	W 90–80	8–2	Clune Arena (1,694); Colorado Springs, CO
December 20, 2015*; 2:00 p.m.	Marist	L 83–89	8–3	Christl Arena (916); West Point, NY
December 28, 2015*; 4:00 p.m.	Monmouth	W 91–84	9–3	Christl Arena (3,033); West Point, NY
Patriot League regular season
December 30, 2015; 7:00 p.m.	at Lehigh	W 88–82	10–3 (1–0)	Stabler Arena (1,195); Bethlehem, PA
January 2, 2016; 3:00 p.m.	Bucknell	L 76–84	10–4 (1–1)	Christl Arena (1,597); West Point, NY
January 6, 2016; 7:00 p.m.	Lafayette	L 73–76	10–5 (1–2)	Christl Arena (443); West Point, NY
January 9, 2016; 7:00 p.m.	at Loyola (MD)	W 73–59	11–5 (2–2)	Reitz Arena (1,042); Baltimore, MD
January 13, 2016; 7:00 p.m.	at Colgate	L 66–80	11–6 (2–3)	Cotterell Court (720); Hamilton, NY
January 17, 2016; 12:00 p.m., CBSSN	American	W 65–45	12–6 (3–3)	Christl Arena (912); West Point, NY
January 20, 2016; 7:00 p.m.	at Holy Cross	L 65–69	12–7 (3–4)	Hart Center (1,359); Worcester, MA
January 27, 2016; 7:00 p.m.	Boston University	L 67–76	12–8 (3–5)	Christl Arena (621); West Point, NY
January 30, 2016; 7:00 p.m.	at Bucknell	L 66–94	12–9 (3–6)	Sojka Pavilion (3,513); Lewisburg, PA
February 1, 2016; 7:30 p.m.	Navy; Postponed from January 23, 2016	L 50–64	12–10 (3–7)	Christl Arena (3,133); West Point, NY
February 3, 2016; 7:00 p.m.	at Lafayette	W 84–81 ^{OT}	13–10 (4–7)	Kirby Sports Center (1,554); Easton, PA
February 6, 2016; 3:00 p.m.	at Loyola (MD)	L 99–100 ^{2OT}	13–11 (4–8)	Reitz Arena (1,113); Baltimore, MD
February 8, 2016; 7:30 p.m., CBSSN	Colgate	W 82–72	14–11 (5–8)	Christl Arena (486); West Point, NY
02/13, 2016; 4:00 p.m.	at American	W 65–59	15–11 (6–8)	Bender Arena (1,342); Washington, D.C.
02/17, 2016; 7:00 p.m.	Holy Cross	W 72–68	16–11 (7–8)	Christl Arena (1,086); West Point, NY
February 20, 2016; 1:30 p.m., CBSSN	at Navy	W 80–78 ^{2OT}	17–11 (8–8)	Alumni Hall (5,510); Annapolis, MD
February 23, 2016; 7:00 p.m., ASN	at Boston University	W 80–71	18–11 (9–8)	Case Gym (504); Boston, MA
February 27, 2016; 12:00 p.m.	Lehigh	L 72–82	18–12 (9–9)	Christl Arena (2,233); West Point, NY
Patriot League tournament
March 3, 2016; 7:00 p.m.	Colgate; Quarterfinals	W 79–72	19–12	Christl Arena (482); West Point, NY
March 6, 2016; 12:00 p.m.	Holy Cross; Semifinals	L 38–60	19–13	Christl Arena (1,107); West Point, NY
CIT
March 16, 2016*; 7:30 p.m., ESPN3	at NJIT; First round	L 65–79	19–14	Fleisher Center (855); Newark, NJ
*Non-conference game. ^{#}Rankings from AP poll. (#) Tournament seedings in parentheses. All times are in Eastern.
