= 2015–16 Holy Cross Crusaders men's basketball team =

American college basketball season

2015–16 Holy Cross Crusaders men's basketball

Patriot League tournament champions

NCAA tournament, First Round
- Conference: Patriot League
- Record: 15–20 (5–13 Patriot)
- Head coach: Bill Carmody (1st season)
- Assistant coaches: Kevin Driscoll; Joe Kennedy; Freddie Owens
- Home arena: Hart Center

2015–16 Patriot League men's basketball standings
	Conf.				Overall
Team	W		L	PCT	W		L	PCT
Bucknell	14	–	4	.778	17	–	14	.548
Lehigh	13	–	5	.722	17	–	15	.531
Boston University	11	–	7	.611	19	–	15	.559
Army	9	–	9	.500	19	–	14	.576
Navy	9	–	9	.500	19	–	14	.576
Colgate	9	–	9	.500	13	–	17	.433
American	9	–	9	.500	12	–	19	.387
Loyola (MD)	8	–	10	.444	9	–	21	.300
Holy Cross †	5	–	13	.278	15	–	20	.429
Lafayette	3	–	15	.167	6	–	24	.200
† 2016 Patriot League tournament winner

The 2015–16 Holy Cross Crusaders men's basketball team represented the College of the Holy Cross during the 2015–16 NCAA Division I men's basketball season. The Crusaders, led by first year head coach Bill Carmody, played their home games at the Hart Center and were members of the Patriot League. They finished the season 15–20, 5–13 in Patriot League play to finish in ninth place. As the #9 seed, they defeated Loyola (MD), Bucknell, Army, and Lehigh to be champions of the Patriot League tournament and earn the conference's automatic bid to the NCAA tournament. As a #16 seed in the First Four they defeated Southern to advance to the first round where they lost to Oregon.

== Previous season ==
The Crusaders finished the 2014–15 season 14–16, 8–10 in Patriot League play to finish in a three-way tie for sixth place. They advanced to the quarterfinals of the Patriot League tournament where they lost to Bucknell.

== Departures ==
Name	Number	Pos.	Height	Weight	Year	Hometown	Notes
Justin Burrell	3	G	5'9"	165	Senior	Dumfries, VA	Graduated
Chris Jayne	4	G	5'11"	160	Senior	Newburyport, MA	Graduated
Malcolm Miller	13	F	6'7"	210	Senior	Laytonsville, MD	Graduated
De'Vaughn Reid	15	G	6'0"	165	Senior	West Orange, NJ	Graduated
Patrick Kerrigan	40	F	6'8"	215	Senior	Fairfield, CT	Graduated
Taylor Abt	43	F	6'8"	225	Senior	Darnestown, MD	Graduated
Mitchell Hahn	44	F	6'8"	205	Freshman	Fremont, NE	Transferred to Nebraska–Omaha

== Incoming recruits ==
College recruiting information
Name	Hometown	School	Height	Weight	Commit date
Marcellis Perkins; SG	Chesapeake, VA	Fishburne Military School	6 ft 4 in (1.93 m)	185 lb (84 kg)	May 13, 2014
Marcellis Perkins; SG	Recruit ratings: Scout: Rivals: (72)				
Jehyve Floyd #81 PF	Parlin, NJ	Sayreville War Memorial High	6 ft 7 in (2.01 m)	180 lb (82 kg)	Jul 7, 2014
Jehyve Floyd #81 PF	Recruit ratings: Scout: Rivals: (63)				
Matt Zignorski #115 SG	Oak Ridge, NJ	Pope John XXIII High School	6 ft 1 in (1.85 m)	165 lb (75 kg)	Apr 18, 2015
Matt Zignorski #115 SG	Recruit ratings: Scout: Rivals: (61)				
Pat Benzan; PG	West Roxbury, MA	Roxbury Latin School	5 ft 11 in (1.80 m)	165 lb (75 kg)	Jun 13, 2013
Pat Benzan; PG	Recruit ratings: Scout: Rivals: (NR)				
Karl Charles; SG	Somerset, NJ	Rutgers Prep High School	6 ft 3 in (1.91 m)	N/A	Apr 10, 2015
Karl Charles; SG	Recruit ratings: Scout: Rivals: (NR)				
Overall recruit ranking:
Note: In many cases, Scout, Rivals, 247Sports, On3, and ESPN may conflict in their listings of height and weight.; In these cases, the average was taken. ESPN grades are on a 100-point scale.; Sources: "2015 Team Ranking". Rivals.

=== 2016 class recruits ===
College recruiting information (2016)
Name	Hometown	School	Height	Weight	Commit date
Jack Stevens #64 C	Ithaca, NY	Kent School	6 ft 10 in (2.08 m)	N/A	Aug 4, 2015
Jack Stevens #64 C	Recruit ratings: Scout: Rivals: (63)				
Overall recruit ranking:
Note: In many cases, Scout, Rivals, 247Sports, On3, and ESPN may conflict in their listings of height and weight.; In these cases, the average was taken. ESPN grades are on a 100-point scale.; Sources: "2016 Team Ranking". Rivals.

== Roster ==
2015–16 Holy Cross Crusaders men's basketball team
Players
Coaches

Pos.	#	Name	Height	Weight	Year	Previous school	Hometown
F	1	Karl Charles	6 ft 6 in (1.98 m)	200 lb (91 kg)	Fr	Rutgers Prep	Piscataway, New Jersey
G	2	Anthony Thompson	5 ft 10 in (1.78 m)	150 lb (68 kg)	Jr	Bullis	Glenn Dale, Maryland
G	5	Cullen Hamilton	6 ft 2 in (1.88 m)	185 lb (84 kg)	Sr	Potomac (VA)	Washington, D.C.
G	10	Pat Benzan	5 ft 11 in (1.8 m)	170 lb (77 kg)	Fr	Roxbury Latin	Wellesley, Massachusetts
F	12	Christopher Morgan	6 ft 7 in (2.01 m)	215 lb (98 kg)	Sr	Gloucester	Gloucester, Virginia
G/F	14	Marcellis Perkins	6 ft 4 in (1.93 m)	185 lb (84 kg)	Fr	Deep Creek	Chesapeake, Virginia
G	15	Patrick Rielly	6 ft 0 in (1.83 m)	175 lb (79 kg)	Jr	North Catholic	Pittsburgh, Pennsylvania
F	20	Jehyve Floyd	6 ft 7 in (2.01 m)	212 lb (96 kg)	Fr	Sayreville War Memorial	Sayreville, New Jersey
F	21	Malachi Alexander	6 ft 7 in (2.01 m)	217 lb (98 kg)	Jr	Eleanor Roosevelt	Bowie, Maryland
F	22	Robert Champion	6 ft 6 in (1.98 m)	203 lb (92 kg)	Jr	Charlotte Christian	Charlotte, North Carolina
G/F	24	Eric Green	6 ft 4 in (1.93 m)	191 lb (87 kg)	Sr	St. Mark's (MA)	Mountain House, California
F	25	Isaiah Baker	6 ft 8 in (2.03 m)	240 lb (109 kg)	Sr	Shipley	Wyncote, Pennsylvania
F	30	Riley Criswell	6 ft 8 in (2.03 m)	205 lb (93 kg)	Jr	Carrollton	Carrollton, Georgia
G	31	Matt Zignorski	6 ft 2 in (1.88 m)	170 lb (77 kg)	Fr	Pope John XXIII	Sparta, New Jersey
F	40	Derek Mountain	6 ft 5 in (1.96 m)	215 lb (98 kg)	Fr	Haverford School	Bryn Mawr, Pennsylvania
C	42	Matt Husek	6 ft 11 in (2.11 m)	240 lb (109 kg)	Jr	Bethlehem Catholic (PA)	Stewartsville, New Jersey

Head coach

- Bill Carmody (Union (NY))

Assistant coach(es)

- Kevin Driscoll (Misericordia)
- Joe Kennedy (Northwestern)
- Freddie Owens (Wisconsin)

Legend

- (C) Team captain
- (S) Suspended
- (I) Ineligible
- (W) Walk-on
- Injured
- Current redshirt

Roster

== Schedule ==
Date time, TV	Rank^{#}	Opponent^{#}	Result	Record	Site (attendance) city, state
Exhibition
Nov 5*; 7:05 pm		Assumption	W 85–79 ^{OT}		Hart Center (976); Worcester, MA
Non-conference regular season
Nov 13*; 7:00 pm		at Marist	W 67–64	1–0	McCann Field House (1,707); Poughkeepsie, NY
Nov 16*; 7:00 pm		at Brown	L 55–71	1–1	Pizzitola Sports Center (1,224); Providence, RI
Nov 19*; 7:05 pm		New Hampshire	L 69–73	1–2	Hart Center (1,794); Worcester, MA
Nov 22*; 1:00 pm		at Quinnipiac	L 56–62	1–3	TD Bank Sports Center (1,381); Hamden, CT
Nov 25*; 1:05 pm		Sacred Heart	W 69–60	2–3	Hart Center (1,104); Worcester, MA
Nov 29*; 1:05 pm		Harvard	W 50-49	3-3	Hart Center (1,796); Worcester, MA
Dec 2*; 7:00 pm		at Rhode Island	L 56–74	3–4	Ryan Center (3,442); Kingston, RI
Dec 5*; 2:05 pm		Albany	L 84–88 ^{OT}	3–5	Hart Center (1,494); Worcester, MA
Dec 9*; 8:00 pm, ESPN3		at No. 2 Kansas	L 59–92	3–6	Allen Fieldhouse (16,300); Lawrence, KS
Dec 12*; 7:00 pm		at Hartford	W 90–68	4–6	Chase Arena at Reich Family Pavilion (1,072); Hartford, CT
Dec 21*; 7:05 pm		Maine	W 76–75	5–6	Hart Center (1,014); Worcester, MA
Patriot League regular season
Dec 30; 7:05 pm		Boston University	W 80–64	6–6 (1–0)	Hart Center (2,345); Worcester, MA
Jan 2; 1:00 pm		at Navy	L 60–65	6–7 (1–1)	Alumni Hall (2,677); Annapolis, MD
Jan 6; 7:05 pm		Colgate	W 65–63	7–7 (2–1)	Hart Center (1,256); Worcester, MA
Jan 9; 2:00 pm		at Bucknell	L 71–98	7–8 (2–2)	Sojka Pavilion (3,111); Lewisburg, PA
Jan 13; 7:00 pm		at Lafayette	L 52–65	7–9 (2–3)	Kirby Sports Center (1,335); Easton, PA
Jan 16; 1:05 pm		Lehigh	L 66–87	7–10 (2–4)	Hart Center (1,301); Worcester, MA
Jan 20; 7:05 pm		Army	W 69–65	8–10 (3–4)	Hart Center (1,359); Worcester, MA
Jan 24; 7:00 pm		at Colgate; Moved up from 2/3/16	L 61–76	8–11 (3–5)	Cotterell Court (674); Hamilton, NY
Jan 27; 7:05 pm		Loyola (MD)	L 54–71	8–12 (3–6)	Hart Center (1,646); Worcester, MA
Jan 30; 1:05 pm		Navy	W 87–80 ^{OT}	9–12 (4–6)	Hart Center (1,834); Worcester, MA
Feb 1; 5:30 pm		at American; Postponed from 1/24/16	L 45–58	9–13 (4–7)	Bender Arena (457); Washington, D.C.
Feb 6; 1:05 pm		Bucknell	L 52–77	9–14 (4–8)	Hart Center (2,647); Worcester, MA
Feb 10; 7:05 pm		Lafayette	W 67–53	10–14 (5–8)	Hart Center (1,067); Worcester, MA
Feb 15; 7:30 pm, CBSSN		at Lehigh	L 59–64	10–15 (5–9)	Stabler Arena (710); Bethlehem, PA
Feb 17; 7:00 pm		at Army	L 68–72	10–16 (5–10)	Christl Arena (1,086); West Point, NY
Feb 21; 12:05 pm		American	L 70–71 ^{OT}	10–17 (5–11)	Hart Center (1,909); Worcester, MA
Feb 24; 7:30 pm		at Loyola (MD)	L 63–78	10–18 (5–12)	Reitz Arena (602); Baltimore, MD
Feb 27; 12:00 pm		at Boston University	L 68–83	10–19 (5–13)	Case Gym (1,237); Boston, MA
Patriot League tournament
Mar 1; 7:30 pm	(9)	at (8) Loyola (MD); First Round	W 72–67	11–19	Reitz Arena (408); Baltimore, MD
Mar 3; 7:00 pm	(9)	at (1) Bucknell; Quarterfinals	W 77–72 ^{2OT}	12–19	Sojka Pavilion (2,700); Lewisburg, PA
Mar 6; 2:00 pm, CBSSN	(9)	at (4) Army; Semifinals	W 60–38	13–19	Christl Arena (1,107); West Point, NY
Mar 9; 7:30 pm, CBSSN	(9)	at (2) Lehigh; Championship	W 59–56	14–19	Stabler Arena (4,587); Bethlehem, PA
NCAA tournament
Mar 16*; 6:40 pm, truTV	(16 W)	vs. (16 W) Southern; First Four	W 59–55	15–19	UD Arena (12,582); Dayton, OH
Mar 18*; 7:50 pm, truTV	(16 W)	vs. (1 W) No. 5 Oregon; First Round	L 52–91	15–20	Spokane Veterans Memorial Arena (11,274); Spokane, WA
*Non-conference game. ^{#}Rankings from AP Poll. (#) Tournament seedings in parentheses. W=West Region. All times are in Eastern Time..
