= 2016 Patriot League men's basketball tournament =

- Classification: Division I
- Season: 2015–16
- Teams: 10
- Site: Campus sites
- Champions: Holy Cross (6th title)
- Winning coach: Bill Carmody (1st title)
- MVP: Malachi Alexander (Holy Cross)
- Attendance: 14,657
- Television: PLN, CBSSN

2015–16 Patriot League men's basketball standings
	Conf.				Overall
Team	W		L	PCT	W		L	PCT
Bucknell	14	–	4	.778	17	–	14	.548
Lehigh	13	–	5	.722	17	–	15	.531
Boston University	11	–	7	.611	19	–	15	.559
Army	9	–	9	.500	19	–	14	.576
Navy	9	–	9	.500	19	–	14	.576
Colgate	9	–	9	.500	13	–	17	.433
American	9	–	9	.500	12	–	19	.387
Loyola (MD)	8	–	10	.444	9	–	21	.300
Holy Cross †	5	–	13	.278	15	–	20	.429
Lafayette	3	–	15	.167	6	–	24	.200
† 2016 Patriot League tournament winner

The 2016 Patriot League men's basketball tournament was played March 1, 3, 6 and 9 with the higher seed in each matchup hosting at their respective campus sites. The tournament champion, Holy Cross, received the League's automatic bid to the NCAA tournament.

== Seeds ==
Teams were seeded by conference record, with ties broken in the following order:

- Record between the tied teams.
- Record against the highest-seeded team not involved in the tie, going down through the seedings as necessary.
- Higher RPI entering the conference tournament.

Seed	School	Conference	Overall	Tiebreaker #1	Tiebreaker #2
1	Bucknell	14–4	17–12		
2	Lehigh	13–5	15–14		
3	Boston U	11–7	18–13		
4	Army	9–9	18–12	2–0 vs. American, 1–1 vs. Navy, 1–1 vs. Colgate	
5	Colgate	9–9	13–16	1–1 vs. Navy, 1–1 vs. American, 1–1 vs. Army	2–0 vs. Bucknell
6	American	9–9	11–18	1–1 vs. Colgate, 0–2 vs. Army, 2–0 vs. Navy	1–1 vs. Bucknell
7	Navy	9–9	18–13	1–1 vs. Army, 1–1 vs. Colgate, 0–2 vs. American	
8	Loyola (MD)	8–10	9–20		
9	Holy Cross	5–13	10–19		
10	Lafayette	3–15	6–23		

== Schedule ==
Game	Time*	Matchup	Final score	Attendance	Television
First round – Tuesday, March 1
1	7:30 pm	#9 Holy Cross at #8 Loyola (MD)	72–67	408	PLN
2	7:00 pm	#10 Lafayette at #7 Navy	70–78	687	PLN
Quarterfinals – Thursday, March 3
3	7:00 pm	#9 Holy Cross at #1 Bucknell	77–72^{2OT}	2,700	PLN
4	7:00 pm	#5 Colgate at #4 Army	72–79	482	PLN
5	7:00 pm	#6 American at #3 Boston U	69–64	731	butv 10, PLN
6	7:00 pm	#7 Navy at #2 Lehigh	63–65	1,730	SE2, PLN
Semifinals – Sunday, March 6
7	12:00 pm	#9 Holy Cross at #4 Army	60–38	1,107	CBSSN
8	2:00 pm	#6 American at #2 Lehigh	62–78	2,225	CBSSN
Championship – Wednesday, March 9
9	7:30 pm	#9 Holy Cross vs. #2 Lehigh	59–56	4,587	CBSSN
*Game times in ET. #-Rankings denote tournament seeding. All games hosted by higher-seeded team.

== Bracket ==
First round March 1 Patriot League Network
8	Loyola (MD)	67
9	Holy Cross	72
7	Navy	78
10	Lafayette	70

Quarterfinals; March 3 Patriot League Network
1	Bucknell	72
9	Holy Cross	77**
4	Army	79
5	Colgate	72
2	Lehigh	65
7	Navy	63
3	Boston U	64
6	American	69

Semifinals; March 6 CBS Sports Network
9	Holy Cross	60
4	Army	38
2	Lehigh	78
6	American	62

Championship; March 9 CBS Sports Network
9	Holy Cross	59
2	Lehigh	56

* indicates overtime period.
