= Loyola Greyhounds men's basketball =

American university basketball team

2026–27 Loyola Greyhounds men's basketball team
- University: Loyola University Maryland
- Head coach: Josh Loeffler (3rd season)
- Location: Baltimore, Maryland
- Arena: Reitz Arena (capacity: 2,100)
- Conference: Patriot
- Nickname: Greyhounds
- Colors: Green and gray

NCAA Division I tournament second round
- 1973*

NCAA Division I tournament appearances
- 1973*, 1994, 2012

NAIA tournament second round
- 1949, 1953

NAIA tournament appearances
- 1947, 1948, 1949, 1953

Conference tournament champions
- MAAC: 1994, 2012

Uniforms
Home	Away	Alternate
- * at Division II level

The Loyola Greyhounds men's basketball team represents Loyola University Maryland in National Collegiate Athletic Association Division I competition. It became a member of the Patriot League along with the university's other intercollegiate athletic programs on July 1, 2013. Home games are played at Reitz Arena. Loyola has appeared twice in the NCAA tournament, most recently in 2012.

== History ==
The program participated in the first interracial American basketball game played south of the Mason–Dixon line at Hurt Gymnasium on February 12, 1952, a 65–63 win over Morgan State.

Upon moving up from Division II in 1981, Loyola was an original member of the ECAC Metro Conference which changed its name to the Northeast Conference (NEC) on August 1, 1988. During its eight seasons in the circuit, the Greyhounds never won the championship and had no appearances in either the NCAA or National Invitation Tournaments. The only player in the program's Division I history to have reached the National Basketball Association (NBA) is Mike Morrison, a four-year letterman from 1985 to 1989. An All-Conference First Team as a junior and senior, he was selected by the Phoenix Suns in the second round (51st overall) of the 1989 NBA draft. He was eventually named to the NEC 25th Anniversary All-Time Team in January 2006. Mark Amatucci was also honored as the circuit's Jim Phelan Coach of the Year in 1983–84.

Loyola was a member of the Metro Atlantic Athletic Conference (MAAC) from 1989 to 2013. The Greyhounds won the MAAC Championship to earn the automatic bid into the NCAA tournament twice. The first time was in 1993–94 with an 80–75 win over Manhattan at Knickerbocker Arena and Tracy Bergan earning conference tournament Most Valuable Player (MVP) honors. This was also Skip Prosser's only campaign as the program's head coach. The Greyhounds' next conference title came 18 years later in 2012 with MVP Erik Etherly spearheading a 48–44 victory over Fairfield at MassMutual Center. Jimmy Patsos was the MAAC Coach of the Year that season. The MAAC era at Loyola ended with Patsos' departure to Siena on April 2, 2013.

G.G. Smith, an assistant coach under Patsos for six seasons, was promoted to lead the Greyhounds into the Patriot League on April 12, 2013. He announced his resignation on March 8, 2018 after five seasons in which the team posted 56–98 and 35–55 records overall and in the conference respectively.

Tavaras Hardy, an assistant coach on Josh Pastner's staff at Georgia Tech for two years, was appointed as Smith's successor 20 days later on March 28. His third campaign at Loyola ended with the Greyhounds advancing to its first Patriot League Championship Game in an 85–72 loss at Colgate on March 14, 2021 despite entering the tournament as the No. 9 seed.

== NCAA Division I seasons ==
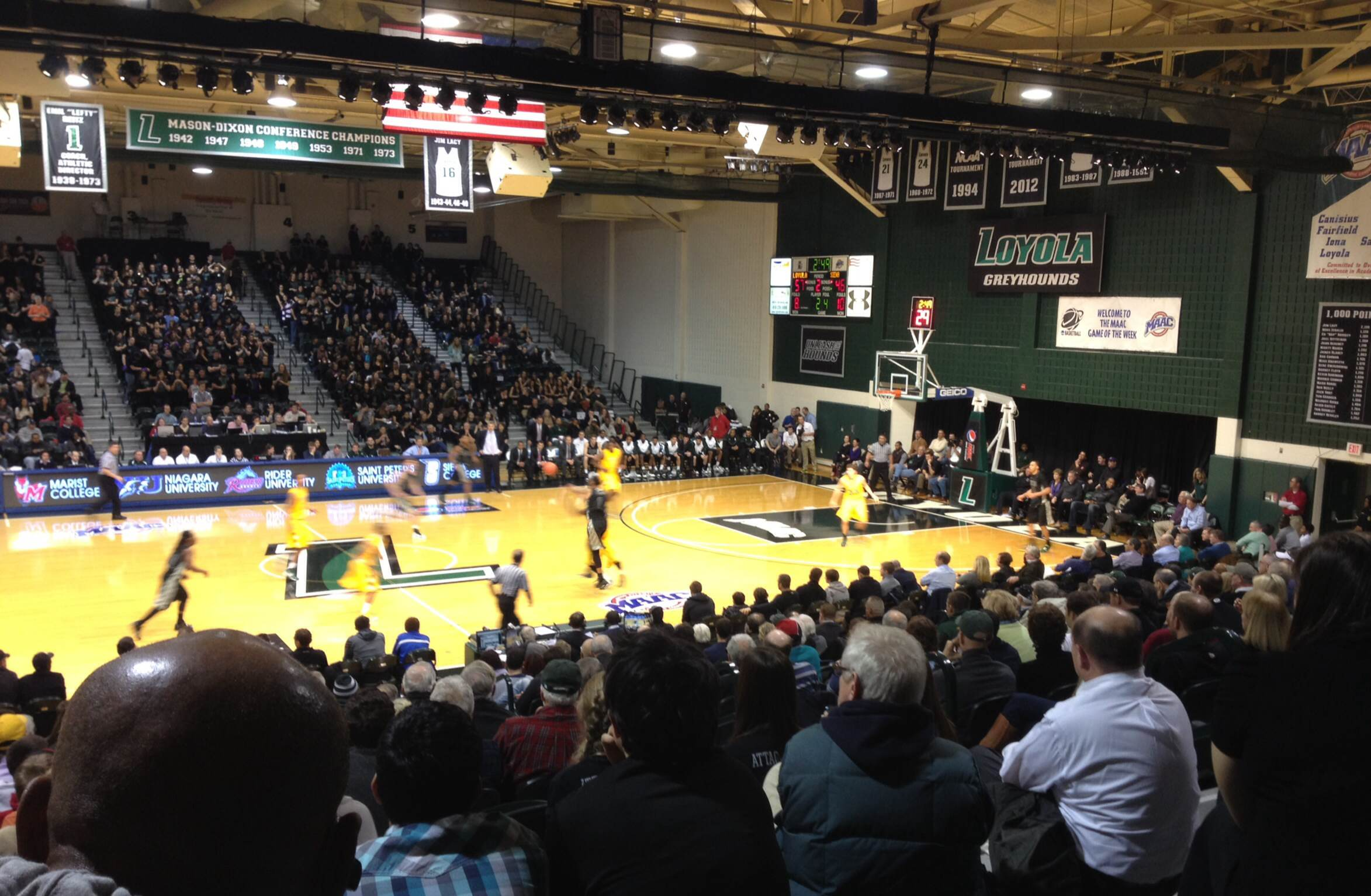
Loyola Greyhounds v. Siena Saints, Reitz Arena, Friday, February 8, 2013.

Record table
Season	Coach	Overall	Conference	Standing	Postseason
ECAC-Metro Conference (1981–1988)
1981–82	Bill Burke	11–16	7–7	3rd South	
1982–83	Mark Amatucci	4–23	3–11	4th South/Last	
1983–84	Mark Amatucci	16–12	10–6	4th	
1984–85	Mark Amatucci	16–14	8–6	4th	
1985–86	Mark Amatucci	16–12	10–6	3rd	
1986–87	Mark Amatucci	15–14	10–6	3rd	
1987–88	Mark Amatucci	8–22	6–10	6th	
Northeast Conference (1988–1989)
1988–89	Mark Amatucci	10–18	7–9	5th	
Metro Atlantic Athletic Conference (1989–2013)
1989–90	Tom Schneider	4–24	2–14	6th South/Last	
1990–91	Tom Schneider	12–16	5–11	7th	
1991–92	Tom Schneider	14–14	10–6	4th	
1992–93	Tom Schneider (1–10)/Joe Boylan (1–15)	2–25	1–13	8th/Last	
1993–94	Skip Prosser	17–13	6–8	5th	NCAA Division I Round of 64
1994–95	Brian Ellerbe	9–18	5–9	6th	
1995–96	Brian Ellerbe	12–15	8–6	4th	
1996–97	Brian Ellerbe	13–14	10–4	3rd	
1997–98	Dino Gaudio	12–16	9–9	6th	
1998–99	Dino Gaudio	13–15	6–12	9th	
1999–00	Dino Gaudio	7–21	4–14	9th	
2000–01	Scott Hicks	6–23	2–16	9th	
2001–02	Scott Hicks	5–23	4–14	9th	
2002–03	Scott Hicks	4–24	1–17	10th/Last	
2003–04	Scott Hicks	1–27	1–17	10th/Last	
2004–05	Jimmy Patsos	6–22	5–13	9th	
2005–06	Jimmy Patsos	15–13	8–10	6th	
2006–07	Jimmy Patsos	18–13	12–6	4th	
2007–08	Jimmy Patsos	19–14	12–6	4th	
2008–09	Jimmy Patsos	12–20	7–11	8th	
2009–10	Jimmy Patsos	13–17	6–12	8th	
2010–11	Jimmy Patsos	15–15	10–8	5th	
2011–12	Jimmy Patsos	24–9	13–5	2nd	NCAA Division I Round of 64
2012–13	Jimmy Patsos	23–12	11–7	2nd	CIT Quarterfinals
Patriot League (2013–present)
2013–14	G.G. Smith	11–19	6–12	8th	
2014–15	G.G. Smith	11–19	7–11	9th	
2015–16	G.G. Smith	9–20	8–10	8th	
2016–17	G.G. Smith	16–17	8–10	7th	CBI Quarterfinals
2017–18	G.G. Smith	9–22	6–12	8th	
2018–19	Tavaras Hardy	11–21	7–11	9th	
2019–20	Tavaras Hardy	15–17	7–11	9th	
2020–21	Tavaras Hardy	6–11	4–10	9th	
2021–22	Tavaras Hardy	14–16	8–10	6th	
2022–23	Tavaras Hardy	13–20	7–11	8th	
2023–24	Tavaras Hardy	7–25	5–13	10th/Last	
2024–25	Josh Loeffler	12–19	6–12	8th	
2025–26	Josh Loeffler	12–20	8–10	6th	
Total:		518–800			
National champion Postseason invitational champion Conference regular season champion Conference regular season and conference tournament champion Division regular season champion Division regular season and conference tournament champion Conference tournament champion

- Due to the COVID-19 pandemic, the Patriot League for the 2020–21 season was temporarily divided into three regional mini-conferences based on geography. Each team played a 16-game regular-season schedule which included four matches against each regional opponent. As usual, listed standings position reflected by conference tournament seed.

Sources: Loyola University Maryland Men's Basketball Year-By-Year Records; Northeast Conference 2012–13 Men's Basketball Record Book; Metro Atlantic Athletic Conference Men's Basketball All-Time Standings.

== Postseason tournaments ==
=== NCAA Division I Tournament results ===
The Greyhounds have made two appearances in the NCAA Division I men's basketball tournament. Their combined record is 0–2.

Year	Seed	Round	Opponent	Result
1994	#15	Round of 64	#2 Arizona	L 55–81
2012	#15	Round of 64	#2 Ohio State	L 59–78

=== CBI results ===
The Greyhounds have appeared in one College Basketball Invitational (CBI). Their record is 1–1.

Year	Round	Opponent	Result
2017	First round Quarterfinals	George Mason; Coastal Carolina	W 73–58; L 63–72

=== CIT results ===
The Greyhounds have appeared in one CollegeInsider.com Postseason Tournament (CIT). Their record is 2–1.

Year	Round	Opponent	Result
2013	First round Second Round; Quarterfinals	Boston University; Kent State; East Carolina	W 70–63; W 73–59; L 58–70

=== NCAA Division II tournament results ===
The Greyhounds have appeared in the NCAA Division II tournament one time. Their record is 1–2.

Year	Round	Opponent	Result
1973	Regional Quarterfinals; Regional semifinals Regional 3rd-place game	Biscayne; Roanoke; Fayetteville State	W 82–79 ^{OT} L 63–84; L 66–81

=== NAIA tournament results ===
The Greyhounds have appeared in the NAIA tournament four times. Their combined record is 2–4.

Year	Round	Opponent	Result
1947	First round	Hastings	L 44–53
1948	First round	Emporia State	L 57–65
1949	First round Second Round	Cedarville; Indiana State	W 79–67; L 58–79
1953	First round Second Round	Portland; Mississippi Southern	W 66–64; L 72–106
