= Josh Loeffler =

American basketball coach (born 1981/1982)

Current position
- Title: Head coach
- Team: Loyola (MD)
- Conference: Patriot League
- Record: 25–44 (.362)

Biographical details
- Born: July 22, 1981 (age 45)
- Education: Swarthmore College (2003)

Playing career

Basketball
- 1999–2003: Swarthmore

Coaching career (HC unless noted)

Basketball
- 2003–2004: Hamilton (assistant)
- 2004–2005: St. Lawrence (GA)
- 2005–2006: Williams (assistant)
- 2006–2008: Stevens Tech
- 2008–2012: Lafayette (assistant)
- 2013–2017: Loyola (MD) (assistant)
- 2017–2023: Johns Hopkins
- 2023–2024: Cincinnati (assistant)
- 2024–present: Loyola (MD)

Football
- 2003: Hamilton (DL)

Administrative career (AD unless noted)
- 2012–2013: Rutgers (DBO)
- 2023–2024: Cincinnati (CAS)

Head coaching record
- Overall: 185–84 (.688)
- Tournaments: 6–5 (NCAA D-III)

Josh Loeffler (born 1981 or 1982) is an American basketball coach who is the current head coach of the Loyola Greyhounds men's basketball team. He played college basketball for the Swarthmore Garnet Tide and has previously worked with the Hamilton Continentals, St. Lawrence Saints, Williams Ephs, Stevens Tech Ducks, Lafayette Leopards, Rutgers Scarlet Knights, Loyola Greyhounds, Johns Hopkins Blue Jays, and Cincinnati Bearcats.

== Early life ==
Loeffler grew up in West Grove, Pennsylvania, and attended Wilmington Friends School in Delaware. At Wilmington, he played football and basketball; Loeffler was co-captain of the football team. He graduated from Wilmington in 1999 and then attended Swarthmore College in Pennsylvania, where he played four years on the basketball team and was a starter for three. He graduated from Swarthmore in 2003 and received a degree in economics.

== Coaching career ==
Loeffler got his first coaching job at Hamilton College in 2003, serving one season as assistant basketball coach while helping them reach the NCAA Division III Tournament; he also was the defensive line coach of the football team. He then was a graduate assistant with the St. Lawrence Saints during the 2004–05 season before becoming an assistant coach for the Williams Ephs in 2005–06.

Loeffler received his first head coaching position with the Stevens Tech Ducks in 2006, leading them to an overall record of 46–13 in his two seasons there, which included an NCAA Tournament appearance and tying for the conference regular season championship each year. He left the program in 2008 to become an assistant for the Lafayette Leopards. Loeffler was the top assistant and recruiting coordinator for the Leopards for four years, leaving in 2012 to become director of operations with the Rutgers Scarlet Knights.

Loeffler remained at Rutgers for a year before joining the Loyola Greyhounds as assistant coach in 2013. After four years in the position, he became head coach of the Division III Johns Hopkins Blue Jays in 2017. In six years in the role, he helped the team compile an overall record of 114–27, which included participation in four NCAA Tournaments and three conference titles. He resigned in 2023 to take a post as assistant at Cincinnati. He also became the team's chief of administrative staff.

After one year at Cincinnati, Loeffler was introduced as the head coach of the Loyola Greyhounds on March 30, 2024.

== Personal life ==
Loeffler is married and has two children.

== Head coaching record ==
Record table
Season	Team	Overall	Conference	Standing	Postseason
Stevens Tech Ducks (Skyline/Empire 8) (2006–2008)
2006–07	Stevens Tech	23–7	13–3	2nd	NCAA Division III Sweet 16
2007–08	Stevens Tech	23–6	12–4	2nd	
Stevens Tech:		46–13 (.780)	25–7 (.781)		
Johns Hopkins Blue Jays (Centennial) (2017–2023)
2017–18	Johns Hopkins	24–5	15–3	1st	NCAA Division III Second Round
2018–19	Johns Hopkins	18–9	14–4	2nd	
2019–20	Johns Hopkins	24–4	16–2	2nd	NCAA Division III First Round
2020–21	Johns Hopkins	0–0	0–0		
2021–22	Johns Hopkins	23–4	16–2	1st	NCAA Division III Second Round
2022–23	Johns Hopkins	25–5	16–2	T–1st	NCAA Division III Sweet 16
Johns Hopkins:		114–27 (.809)	77–13 (.856)		
Loyola Greyhounds (Patriot) (2024–present)
2024–25	Loyola	12–19	6–12	T–8th	
2025–26	Loyola	12–20	8–10	T–6th	
2026–27	Loyola	1–5	0–0		
Loyola:		25–44 (.362)	14–22 (.389)		
Total:		185–84 (.688)			
National champion Postseason invitational champion Conference regular season champion Conference regular season and conference tournament champion Division regular season champion Division regular season and conference tournament champion Conference tournament champion
