= Emmett Davis (basketball) =

American college basketball coach

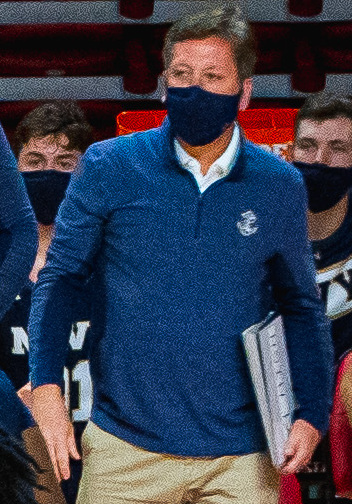
- Davis in 2020

Biographical details
- Born: September 9, 1959 (age 67); Gloversville, New York, U.S.

Playing career
- 1977–1981: St. Lawrence

Coaching career (HC unless noted)
- 1986–1998: Navy (asst.)
- 1998–2011: Colgate
- 2011–2012: Tulsa (asst.)
- 2015–2025: Navy (asst.)

Head coaching record
- Overall: 165–212 (.437)

Emmett Davis (born September 9, 1959) is a former American college basketball coach. He coached Division I for 26 seasons. Davis is currently managing the Mid-Atlantic Regional Accounts for Sports Technology Industry Leader, XOS Digital. Born in Gloversville, New York, he is a former player at St. Lawrence University. Davis spent 12 seasons as an assistant at the US Naval Academy from 1986 to 1998. He coached NBA All-Star and Hall of Famer David Robinson. He helped Navy head coach Don DeVoe to three NCAA tournament bids in his last four seasons at Navy. In 2011–12 he served as an assistant at the University of Tulsa in C-USA. On March 16, 2011, Davis was released from his contract as head coach of Colgate University. He was replaced by Matt Langel.

== Head coaching record ==
Record table
Season	Team	Overall	Conference	Standing	Postseason
Colgate Raiders (Patriot League) (1998–2011)
1998–99	Colgate	14–14	7–5	4th	
1999–00	Colgate	13–16	4–8	4th	
2000–01	Colgate	13–15	6–6	T–3rd	
2001–02	Colgate	17–11	8–6	T–3rd	
2002–03	Colgate	14–14	9–5	T–2nd	
2003–04	Colgate	15–14	6–8	6th	
2004–05	Colgate	14–14	8–6	4th	
2005–06	Colgate	10–19	4–10	6th	
2006–07	Colgate	10–19	5–9	5th	
2007–08	Colgate	18–14	7–7	T–3rd	
2008–09	Colgate	10–20	5–9	T–5th	
2009–10	Colgate	10–19	6–8	6th	
2010–11	Colgate	7–23	4–10	7th	
Colgate:		165–212	79–97		
Total:		165–212			
National champion Postseason invitational champion Conference regular season champion Conference regular season and conference tournament champion Division regular season champion Division regular season and conference tournament champion Conference tournament champion
