= Reitz Arena =

Sports arena at Loyola University, Baltimore, Maryland

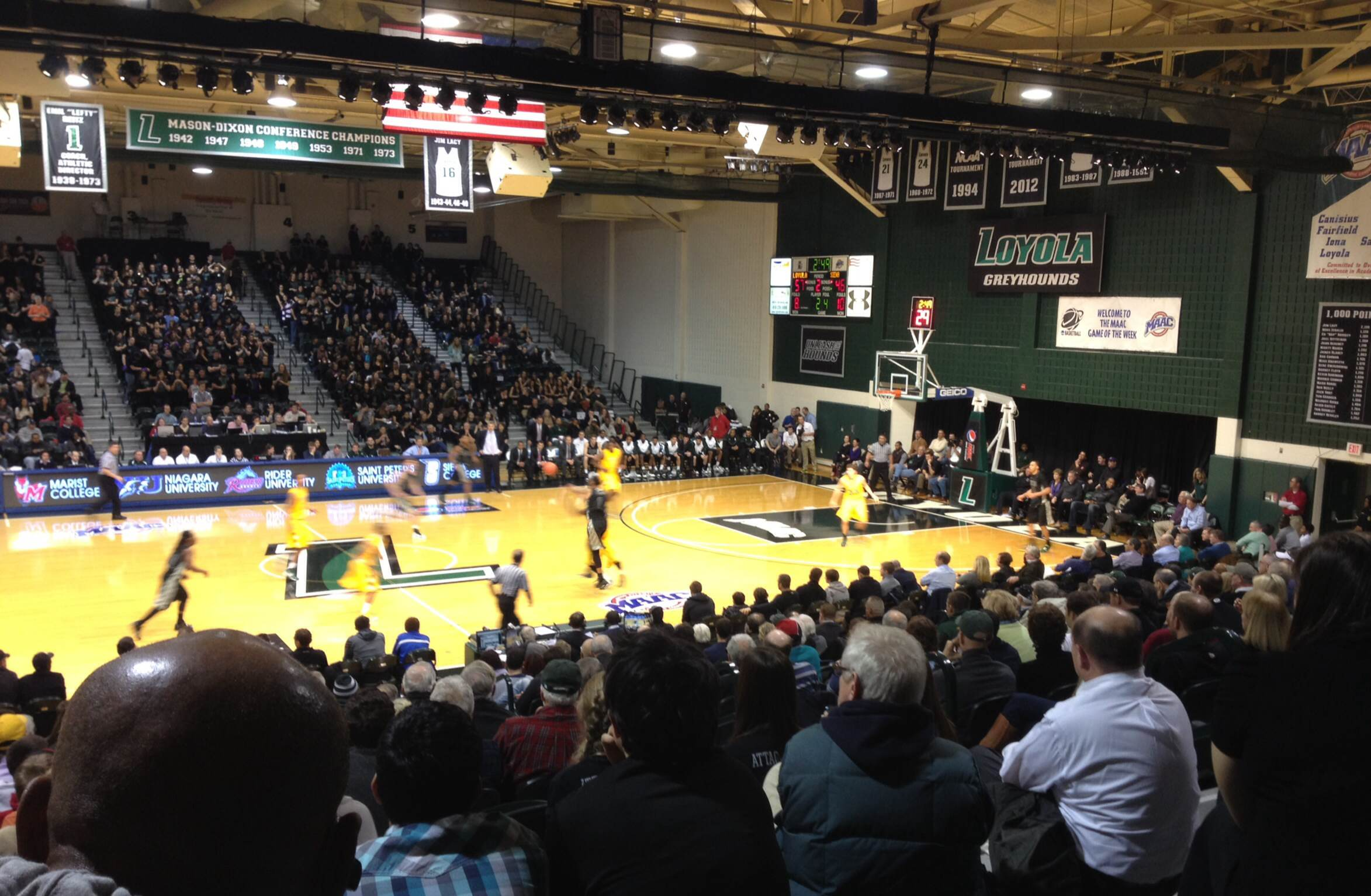
- Loyola Greyhounds v. Siena Saints, Reitz Arena, Friday, February 8, 2013
- Interactive map of Reitz Arena
- Location: 4501 N. Charles Street; Baltimore, Maryland, United States
- Coordinates: 39.346803°N 76.618615°W
- Capacity: 2,100 (basketball & volleyball)
- Surface: Hardwood

Construction
- Opened: 1984

Tenants
- Loyola Greyhounds men's basketball (1984–Present); Loyola Greyhounds women's basketball (1984–Present); Loyola Greyhounds volleyball

Reitz Arena is a multi-purpose arena in Baltimore, Maryland. It is home to the Loyola University Maryland Greyhounds men's and women's basketball teams, as well as the Loyola women's volleyball team. Its seating capacity is 2,100. The arena, adjoining the Andrew White Student Center, has fully retractable seating on both sidelines of the arena to create a full sized ballroom. It replaced the original 1926 Evergreen Gymnasium, directly next to the arena in the Andrew White Student Center.

== See also ==
- List of NCAA Division I basketball arenas
