= 2015–16 Dayton Flyers men's basketball team =

American college basketball season

2015–16 Dayton Flyers men's basketball

Atlantic 10 regular season co–champions

NCAA tournament, First Round
- Conference: Atlantic 10 Conference
- Record: 25–8 (14–4 A-10)
- Head coach: Archie Miller (5th season)
- Assistant coaches: Kevin Kuwik; Allen Griffin; Tom Ostrom
- Home arena: University of Dayton Arena

2015–16 Atlantic 10 men's basketball standings
	Conf.				Overall
Team	W		L	PCT	W		L	PCT
Dayton	14	–	4	.778	25	–	8	.758
VCU	14	–	4	.778	25	–	11	.694
St. Bonaventure	14	–	4	.778	22	–	9	.710
Saint Joseph's †	13	–	5	.722	28	–	8	.778
George Washington	11	–	7	.611	28	–	10	.737
Davidson	10	–	8	.556	20	–	13	.606
Rhode Island	9	–	9	.500	17	–	15	.531
Fordham	8	–	10	.444	17	–	14	.548
Richmond	7	–	11	.389	16	–	16	.500
UMass	6	–	12	.333	14	–	18	.438
Duquesne	6	–	12	.333	17	–	17	.500
George Mason	5	–	13	.278	11	–	21	.344
Saint Louis	5	–	13	.278	11	–	21	.344
La Salle	4	–	14	.222	9	–	22	.290
† 2016 A10 Tournament winner

The 2015–16 Dayton Flyers men's basketball team represented the University of Dayton during the 2015–16 NCAA Division I men's basketball season. The Flyers, led by fifth year head coach Archie Miller, played their home games at the University of Dayton Arena and were members of the Atlantic 10 Conference. They finished the season 25–8, 14–4 in A-10 play to become regular season A-10 co-champions. They defeated Richmond in the quarterfinals of the A-10 tournament to advance to the semifinals where they lost to Saint Joseph's. They received an at-large bid to the NCAA tournament, their third consecutive at-large bid, as a #7 seed in the Midwest Region where they lost to #10 seed Syracuse in the first round

== Previous season ==
The Flyers played most of the 2014–15 season with arguably the most limited roster in Division I men's basketball. Before the start of the season, one player was declared academically ineligible, one was lost for the season to a knee injury, and another ended his playing career on medical advice due to post-concussion symptoms. In December, two more players were dismissed from the team after having been charged with theft. This left the Flyers with only six players who began the season on scholarship; in addition, no player on the remaining roster, whether on scholarship or a walk-on, was taller than 6'6" (1.98 m).

Despite these roster limitations, the Flyers finished 27–9 overall and 13–5 in A-10 play, ending in a tie for second place in the league. They advanced to the championship game of the A-10 tournament where they lost to VCU. They received an at-large bid to the NCAA tournament where they defeated Boise State in the First Four and Providence in the second round. They lost to #3 seeded Oklahoma in the Third Round.

== Departures ==
Name	Number	Pos.	Height	Weight	Year	Hometown	Notes
Jalen Robinson	12	F/C	6'9"	243	Junior	Columbus, OH	Dismissed from team for violation of team rules
Nick Flash Haldes	15	G	6'4"	185	Freshman	Chicago, IL	Walk-on; left the team due to transfer
Jordan Sibert	24	G	6'4"	187	RS Senior	Cincinnati, OH	Graduated
Detwon Rogers	30	F	6'6"	220	Junior	Raleigh, NC	Transferred to Northwest Nazarene
Devon Scott	40	F/C	6'9"	215	Junior	Columbus, OH	Dismissed from team for violation of team rules

=== Incoming transfers ===
Name	Number	Pos.	Height	Weight	Year	Hometown	Previous School
Josh Cunningham	0	F	6'7"	180	Sophomore	Chicago, IL	Transferred from Bradley. Under NCAA transfer rules, Cunningham will have to sit out for the 2015–16 season. Will have three years of remaining eligibility.

== Incoming recruits ==
College recruiting information
Name	Hometown	School	Height	Weight	Commit date
John Crosby; PG	Baltimore, MD	New Hampton School	6 ft 3 in (1.91 m)	180 lb (82 kg)	Sep 22, 2014
John Crosby; PG	Recruit ratings: Scout: Rivals: (79)				
Sam Miller; PF	Arlington, VA	Gonzaga College High School	6 ft 7 in (2.01 m)	215 lb (98 kg)	Jul 30, 2014
Sam Miller; PF	Recruit ratings: Scout: Rivals: (78)				
Xeyrius Williams; PF	Huber Heights, OH	Wayne High School	6 ft 8 in (2.03 m)	205 lb (93 kg)	Jun 22, 2014
Xeyrius Williams; PF	Recruit ratings: Scout: Rivals: (78)				
Ryan Mikesell; SF	Saint Henry, OH	Saint Henry High School	6 ft 6 in (1.98 m)	180 lb (82 kg)	Jul 3, 2014
Ryan Mikesell; SF	Recruit ratings: Scout: Rivals: (NR)				
Overall recruit ranking:
Note: In many cases, Scout, Rivals, 247Sports, On3, and ESPN may conflict in their listings of height and weight.; In these cases, the average was taken. ESPN grades are on a 100-point scale.; Sources: "2015 Team Ranking". Rivals.

=== Recruiting Class of 2016 ===
College recruiting information (2016)
Name	Hometown	School	Height	Weight	Commit date
Trey Landers; SG	Huber Heights, OH	Wayne High School	6 ft 3 in (1.91 m)	170 lb (77 kg)	Mar 2, 2015
Trey Landers; SG	Recruit ratings: Scout: Rivals: (79)				
Overall recruit ranking:
Note: In many cases, Scout, Rivals, 247Sports, On3, and ESPN may conflict in their listings of height and weight.; In these cases, the average was taken. ESPN grades are on a 100-point scale.; Sources: "2016 Team Ranking". Rivals.

== Roster ==
2015–16 Dayton Flyers men's basketball team
Players
Coaches

Pos.	#	Name	Height	Weight	Year	Previous school	Hometown
F	0	Josh Cunningham (I) (redshirt)	6 ft 7 in (2.01 m)	216 lb (98 kg)	So	Morgan Park; Bradley	Chicago, IL
G	1	Darrell Davis	6 ft 4 in (1.93 m)	168 lb (76 kg)	So	Douglass Academy	Detroit, MI
F	2	Sam Miller	6 ft 9 in (2.06 m)	244 lb (111 kg)	Fr	Gonzaga College	Washington, D.C.
G	3	Kyle Davis	6 ft 0 in (1.83 m)	175 lb (79 kg)	Jr	Morgan Park	Chicago, IL
G	4	Charles Cooke	6 ft 5 in (1.96 m)	192 lb (87 kg)	RS Jr	Trenton Catholic Academy; James Madison	Trenton, NJ
C	5	Steve McElvene	6 ft 11 in (2.11 m)	268 lb (122 kg)	RS Fr	New Haven	New Haven, IN
G	10	William Dupuy (W)	5 ft 8 in (1.73 m)	157 lb (71 kg)	Jr	Grapevine	Colleyville, TX
G	11	Scoochie Smith	6 ft 2 in (1.88 m)	180 lb (82 kg)	Jr	Putnam Science Academy	New York, NY
G	14	Jeremiah Bonsu (W)	5 ft 11 in (1.8 m)	150 lb (68 kg)	Jr	Pickerington North	Pickerington, OH
G	15	John Crosby	6 ft 2 in (1.88 m)	192 lb (87 kg)	Fr	New Hampton School	Baltimore, MD
F	20	Xeyrius Williams	6 ft 8 in (2.03 m)	194 lb (88 kg)	Fr	Wayne	Huber Heights, OH
F	21	Dyshawn Pierre	6 ft 6 in (1.98 m)	223 lb (101 kg)	Sr	Anderson CVI	Whitby, ON
F	22	Bobby Wehrli	6 ft 6 in (1.98 m)	205 lb (93 kg)	Sr	Benet Academy	Naperville, IL
G	23	Jack Westerfield (W)	6 ft 1 in (1.85 m)	185 lb (84 kg)	Fr	St. Xavier	Cincinnati, OH
G	24	Michael Schwieterman (W)	6 ft 3 in (1.91 m)	195 lb (88 kg)	Fr	Alter	Kettering, OH
F	25	Kendall Pollard	6 ft 6 in (1.98 m)	235 lb (107 kg)	Jr	Simeon Career Academy	Chicago, IL
F	33	Ryan Mikesell	6 ft 7 in (2.01 m)	195 lb (88 kg)	Fr	St. Henry	St. Henry, OH
G	44	Joey Gruden (W)	6 ft 2 in (1.88 m)	163 lb (74 kg)	Jr	Sycamore	Leesburg, VA

Head coach

- Archie Miller (NC State)

Assistant coach(es)

- Kevin Kuwik (Notre Dame)
- Allen Griffin (Syracuse)
- Tom Ostrom (Minnesota)

Legend

- (C) Team captain
- (S) Suspended
- (I) Ineligible
- (W) Walk-on
- Injured
- Current redshirt

Roster

== Schedule ==
=== Preseason ===
==== News ====
- Dyshawn Pierre suspended for first 10 games of the season.
- For the first time in the history of the men's program, every game will be broadcast on TV.
- Flyers named preseason favorite in Atlantic 10.
- All home games to be broadcast in Mandarin Chinese.

==== Exhibition games ====
The season kicked off, as it does every year, with the Red and Blue game on October 24, 2015. This is a free scrimmage and meet and greet event for the fans. An estimated 3,200 Flyer Faithful showed up for the first opportunity to see new and veteran players on the court.

The Flyers defeated Saginaw Valley State, a Division 2 school who competes in the Great Lakes Intercollegiate Athletic Conference, 96–69 in the only exhibition game this season.

=== Non-conference regular season ===
==== November ====
Dayton's season kicked off with 3 home games before heading down to Orlando to participate in the AdvoCare Invitational over the Thanksgiving holiday. Game one, against Southeast Missouri, gave the Flyer Faithful a potential glimpse of the future as Freshman Ryan Mikesell, later named Atlantic 10 Rookie of the week, led all Dayton scorers with 21. Dayton, which won its 23rd straight home game, started off the game on a 16-1 run and never looked back.

Dayton welcomed SEC foe Alabama to the UD Arena for game two of the season in an ESPN Tip-Off Marathon game. The Flyers were led by Charles Cooke with 21 points and led the game by as many as 34 points to up their season record to 2-0. In game three, the Flyers played host to the Tribe of William & Mary and extended their home winning streak to 25 straight with a 69-66 victory. The Flyers sealed the victory with 5 free throws in the final minute of play.

==== AdvoCare Invitational ====
Coming into this season in the four exempt tournaments coached by Archie Miller, the Flyers were 9-3 and crowned champions of the Old Spice Classic (now the AdvoCare Invitational) in 2011. The first round game match UD up against the Big Ten's Iowa Hawkeyes. The Flyers closed the game on an 11-2 run to start the season 4-0, dropping Iowa to 3-1. UD was again led in scoring by Charles Cooke with 22 points.

The second round game, played the following night, was against the Monmouth Hawks. The scrappy Hawks had just come off of a victory over the then ranked #17 Notre Dame Fighting Irish and already had posted an away victory this season against UCLA. The Flyers, behind Scoochie Smith, extended their second half lead to 16 points and survived a late Hawks rally to head into the title game against long time rival Xavier.

In the 161st meeting between UD and #23 ranked XU, the Flyers were done in by 22 turnovers. The Musketeers went on a 25-4 run to open the second half on their way to the title. For his efforts, Flyers PG, Scoochie Smith was named to the all-tournament team.

==== December ====
In the first game after the break, the Flyers welcomed Atlantic Sun regular season and tournament champions, the North Florida Ospreys men's basketball team to the UD Arena. The Flyers went on a 25–7 run in the second half to put the game away to make their record 6–1. Dayton had 5 players in double figures, led by Charles Cooke's career high 24 points. Steve McElvene was named Atlantic 10 Rookie of the week with 14 points, 16 rebounds and 4 blocks.

Dayton headed to Nashville to face #21 Vanderbilt in the first true road game of the season. The Flyers rallied back from a 16-point first half deficit to upset the Commodores. Dayton was led by Kendall Pollard with a season high 21 points. It was the programs first victory over Vandy in its 5th try. Dayton has won 12 of the last 15 games against SEC foes.

Chattanooga snapped Dayton's 26 game home winning streak in a 61–59 game. The Flyers struggled from the 3 point line, only hitting 3–13 shots, and were outrebounded by the Mocs 33–30. Kendall Pollard scored 20 points to lead Dayton. In the next contest, the Flyers rebounded nicely with a 70–50 victory over Furman led by a pair of double-doubles by Charles Cooke and Steve McElvene. Rival Miami Ohio came to UD Arena for the 132nd game between the two programs. In typical fashion this game came down to the wire with Kyle Davis hitting a jumper with 2.1 seconds left to give the Flyers the 64–63 victory. Dayton leads Miami in the all-time series 71–61.

Dyshawn Pierre returned in the final non-conference game against SEC foe the Arkansas Razorbacks. In the back and forth contest, Arkansas hit a 3 with 1.2 seconds left to force overtime. But, the Flyers closed the game on a 10–2 run to secure the 85–81 victory in OT. In a balanced attack, the Flyers placed 6 players in double figures, led by Charles Cooke with 18. The Flyers closed out the non-conference portion of the season 10–2. Coach Archie Miller won his 100th game as the head coach of the Flyers.

=== Atlantic 10 regular season ===
==== January ====
Dayton opened their 21st season of Atlantic 10 play in Pittsburgh against the Duquesne Dukes. The Flyers were again led by Charles Cooke with 21 points and won the game 66–58. For the third straight season under Coach Archie Miller, the Flyers entered the rankings at #25. Dayton easily cruised to victory over UMASS 93–63 in the A-10 home opener. 6 Flyers scored in double figures, including career highs from John Crosby (11) and Sam Miller (10).

Missing Kendall Pollard for the second straight game, the Flyers stumbled at LaSalle losing their first conference game 61–57. Cold shooting on the night was the Flyers downfall at only 31% for the game. Returning home to UD Arena, the Flyers looked to get back on track facing a hot shooting Davidson Wildcat team. The key stretch was a 19–0 second half run in the 80–74 victory. Four Flyers had double figure scoring nights, led by Scoochie Smith's 18 points. Freshman big man, Steve McElvene, broke the Freshman single season block record with his 34th block.

Dayton looked to avenge last season's buzzer-beater tip-in loss at George Washington by welcoming the Colonials back to UD Arena. The back-and-forth first half ended with a three-pointer as time expired by Flyers senior Dyshawn Pierre. Dayton took the lead for good with about 6 1/2 minutes to go and held on for the 77–70 victory. Dyshawn Pierre led the team in scoring with 26.

Dayton headed out on a 2-game road trip to the state of New York, stopping in Olean first to face St. Bonaventure. The Flyers jumped out to a huge 31-point lead holding the Bonnies to 16 points in the first half. But, the second half was a different story, the Bonnies scored 61 second-half points and the Flyers had to hold on late for an 85–79 victory. Cooke and Pierre led the Flyers with 21 and 20 points each. The second game of the New York road trip took the Flyers to the Bronx to face the Fordham Rams. The Flyers have won 11 straight and 17 of the last 18 meetings versus the Rams. The Flyers jumped out to an early 16–4 lead and never looked back, Charles Cooke led the Flyers with a career high 26 points. For his efforts on the week Cooke was named Atlantic 10 player of the week.

Back home after the New York road trip, the Flyers welcomed rival Saint Louis in a battle for the legendary/elusive/never been seen Arch-Baron Cup. The game was tied 10–10 before the Flyers went on a huge run to blow out the Billikens 73–37. Kendall Pollard led the Flyers with 18 points and 8 rebounds and Steve McElvene tied the blocked shots in a game record with 6. The five game winning streak brought the Flyers record to 17–3 (7–1, A10).

The next game brought a rematch with the only team to beat the Flyers in the Atlantic 10 so far, the LaSalle Explorers. The Flyers started off slow with LaSalle holding an early 10–2 lead, but the Flyers went on a big 28–13 run to close out the half 30–23. The Explorers were held to 32% shooting for the game as Dayton won this rematch 59–44. Kendall Pollard led the Flyers with his second straight game with 18 points and 8 rebounds.

==== February ====
The Flyers entered the rankings for the second time this season and traveled to George Mason and looked for their 6th straight victory against the Patriots. Five Flyers were in double figures as GMU was overwhelmed from the tip. Charles Cooke had 24 points and Freshman John Crosby chipped in a career high 10 in the 98–64 victory.

Up to #19 in the rankings, the Flyers hosted a return game with Duquesne. Tied at 35 at half time and down 12 points with only 5:30 to go, the Flyers stormed back to defeat the Dukes 76–74. Charles Cooke led Dayton in points, rebounds and blocks.

The Flyers headed to Kingston, RI to try and break a 6-game losing streak at the Ryan Center. In a game that was a back and forth battle, Darrell Davis hit a 3-point shot from the corner with 21 seconds left and Dayton held on for their 9th straight victory.

=== Postseason ===
==== NCAA tournament ====
The Dayton Flyers were defeated by Syracuse in the First Found of the NCAA tournament.

=== Game-by-Game Results ===
Date time, TV	Rank^{#}	Opponent^{#}	Result	Record	Site (attendance) city, state
Exhibition
11/07/2015*; 2:00 pm		Saginaw Valley State	W 96–69		UD Arena; Dayton, OH
Non-conference regular season
11/13/2015*; 7:00 pm, TWCSC		Southeast Missouri State	W 84–53	1–0	UD Arena (13,216); Dayton, OH
11/17/2015*; 1:00 pm, ESPN		Alabama; College Hoops Tip-Off Marathon	W 80–48	2–0	UD Arena (12,118); Dayton, OH
11/21/2015*; 2:00 pm, TWCSC		William & Mary	W 69–66	3–0	UD Arena (12,796); Dayton, OH
11/26/2015*; 9:00 pm, ESPN2		vs. Iowa; AdvoCare Invitational First Round	W 82–77	4–0	HP Field House; Lake Buena Vista, FL
11/27/2015*; 9:30 pm, ESPN2		vs. Monmouth; AdvoCare Invitational Semifinals	W 73–70	5–0	HP Field House (4,508); Lake Buena Vista, FL
11/29/2015*; 4:30 pm, ESPN2		vs. No. 23 Xavier; AdvoCare Invitational Championship	L 61–90	5–1	HP Field House (4,633); Lake Buena Vista, FL
12/05/2015*; 2:00 pm, FSOH		North Florida	W 86–71	6–1	UD Arena (12,383); Dayton, OH
12/09/2015*; 9:00 pm, ESPNU		at No. 21 Vanderbilt	W 72–67	7–1	Memorial Gymnasium (10,469); Nashville, TN
12/12/2015*; 7:00 pm, TWCSC		Chattanooga	L 59–61	7–2	UD Arena (12,425); Dayton, OH
12/19/2015*; 7:00 pm, TWCSC		Furman	W 70–50	8–2	UD Arena (12,619); Dayton, OH
12/22/2015*; 7:00 pm, TWCSC		Miami (OH)	W 64–63	9–2	UD Arena (13,206); Dayton, OH
12/30/2015*; 8:00 pm, CBSSN		Arkansas	W 85–81 ^{OT}	10–2	UD Arena (13,455); Dayton, OH
Atlantic 10 regular season
01/02/2016; 2:30 pm, NBCSN		at Duquesne	W 66–58	11–2 (1–0)	Palumbo Center (3,323); Pittsburgh, PA
01/06/2016; 8:00 pm, CBSSN	No. 25	Massachusetts	W 93–63	12–2 (2–0)	UD Arena (12,237); Dayton, OH
01/09/2016; 2:00 pm, TWCSC	No. 25	at La Salle	L 57–61	12–3 (2–1)	Tom Gola Arena (2,711); Philadelphia, PA
01/12/2016; 8:00 pm, CBSSN		Davidson	W 80–74	13–3 (3–1)	UD Arena (12,310); Dayton, OH
01/15/2016; 7:00 pm, ESPN2		George Washington	W 77–70	14–3 (4–1)	UD Arena (12,831); Dayton, OH
01/19/2016; 7:00 pm, ASN		at St. Bonaventure	W 85–79	15–3 (5–1)	Reilly Center (4,176); Olean, NY
01/24/2016; 4:00 pm, CBSSN		at Fordham	W 64–50	16–3 (6–1)	Rose Hill Gymnasium (2,014); Bronx, NY
01/27/2016; 7:00 pm, TWCSC		Saint Louis	W 73–37	17–3 (7–1)	UD Arena (13,455); Dayton, OH
01/30/2016; 2:00 pm, NBCSN		La Salle	W 59–44	18–3 (8–1)	UD Arena (13,455); Dayton, OH
02/06/2016; 6:00 pm, MASN	No. 24	at George Mason	W 98–64	19–3 (9–1)	EagleBank Arena (5,271); Fairfax, VA
02/09/2016; 7:00 pm, ASN	No. 19	Duquesne	W 76–74	20–3 (10–1)	UD Arena (13,141); Dayton, OH
02/12/2016; 7:00 pm, ESPN2	No. 19	at Rhode Island	W 68–66	21–3 (11–1)	Ryan Center (6,105); Kingston, RI
02/17/2016; 6:00 pm, CBSSN	No. 15	at Saint Joseph's	L 70–79	21–4 (11–2)	Hagan Arena (4,200); Philadelphia, PA
02/20/2016; 12:00 pm, NBCSN	No. 15	St. Bonaventure	L 72–79	21–5 (11–3)	UD Arena (13,455); Dayton, OH
02/23/2016; 8:00 pm, CBSSN		at Saint Louis	W 52–49 ^{OT}	22–5 (12–3)	Chaifetz Arena (7,541); St. Louis, MO
02/27/2016; 12:00 pm, ESPN2		Rhode Island	L 66–75	22–6 (12–4)	UD Arena (13,455); Dayton, OH
03/01/2016; 7:30 pm, CBSSN		at Richmond	W 85–84	23–6 (13–4)	Robins Center (7,081); Richmond, VA
03/05/2016; 8:00 pm, CBSSN		VCU	W 68–67 ^{OT}	24–6 (14–4)	UD Arena (13,455); Dayton, OH
Atlantic 10 tournament
03/11/2016; 12:00 pm, NBCSN	(1)	vs. (9) Richmond; Quarterfinals	W 69–54	25–6	Barclays Center (8,223); Brooklyn, NY
03/11/2016; 12:00 pm, CBSSN	(1)	vs. (4) Saint Joseph's; Semifinals	L 79–82	25–7	Barclays Center (10,439); Brooklyn, NY
NCAA tournament
03/18/2016*; 12:15 pm, CBS	(7 MW)	vs. (10 MW) Syracuse; First Round	L 51–70	25–8	Scottrade Center (14,250); St. Louis, MO
*Non-conference game. ^{#}Rankings from AP Poll. (#) Tournament seedings in parentheses. MW=Midwest Region. All times are in Eastern Time.

== Rankings ==
Ranking movement Legend: ██ Increase in ranking. ██ Decrease in ranking. ██ Not ranked the previous week. RV=Others receiving votes.
Poll	Pre	Wk 2	Wk 3	Wk 4	Wk 5	Wk 6	Wk 7	Wk 8	Wk 9	Wk 10	Wk 11	Wk 12	Wk 13	Wk 14	Wk 15	Wk 16	Wk 17	Wk 18	Wk 19	Wk 20	Final
AP	RV	RV	RV	RV	RV	RV	RV	RV	25	RV	RV	RV	24	19	15	RV	RV	RV	RV	RV	N/A
Coaches	RV	RV	RV	RV	RV	RV	RV	RV	RV	RV	RV	RV	24	17	13	22	RV	RV	RV	RV	NR

== See also ==
2015–16 Dayton Flyers women's basketball team
