= Adam Trick =

American football player

No. 20 – Texas Tech Red Raiders
- Position: Linebacker
- Class: Redshirt Senior

Personal information
- Listed height: 6 ft 4 in (1.93 m)
- Listed weight: 250 lb (113 kg)

Career information
- High school: Wayne (Huber Heights, Ohio)
- College: Miami (OH) (2022–2025); Texas Tech (2026–present)
- Stats at ESPN

Adam Trick is an American college football linebacker for the Texas Tech Red Raiders. He previously played for the Miami RedHawks.

== Early life ==
Trick attended Wayne High School in Huber Heights, Ohio. As a senior he had 65 tackles and two sacks. He committed to Miami University to play college football.

== College career ==
After redshirting his first year at Miami in 2022, Trick played in all 14 games in 2023 and had six tackles. In 2024, he started three of 14 games, recording 37 tackles, 4.5 sacks and an interception. In 2025, Trick was named First-Team All-MAC after finishing with 59 tackles, 8.5 sacks and one interception over 13 starts. After the season, he entered the transfer portal and committed to Texas Tech University.
