= D'Mitrik Trice =

American basketball player

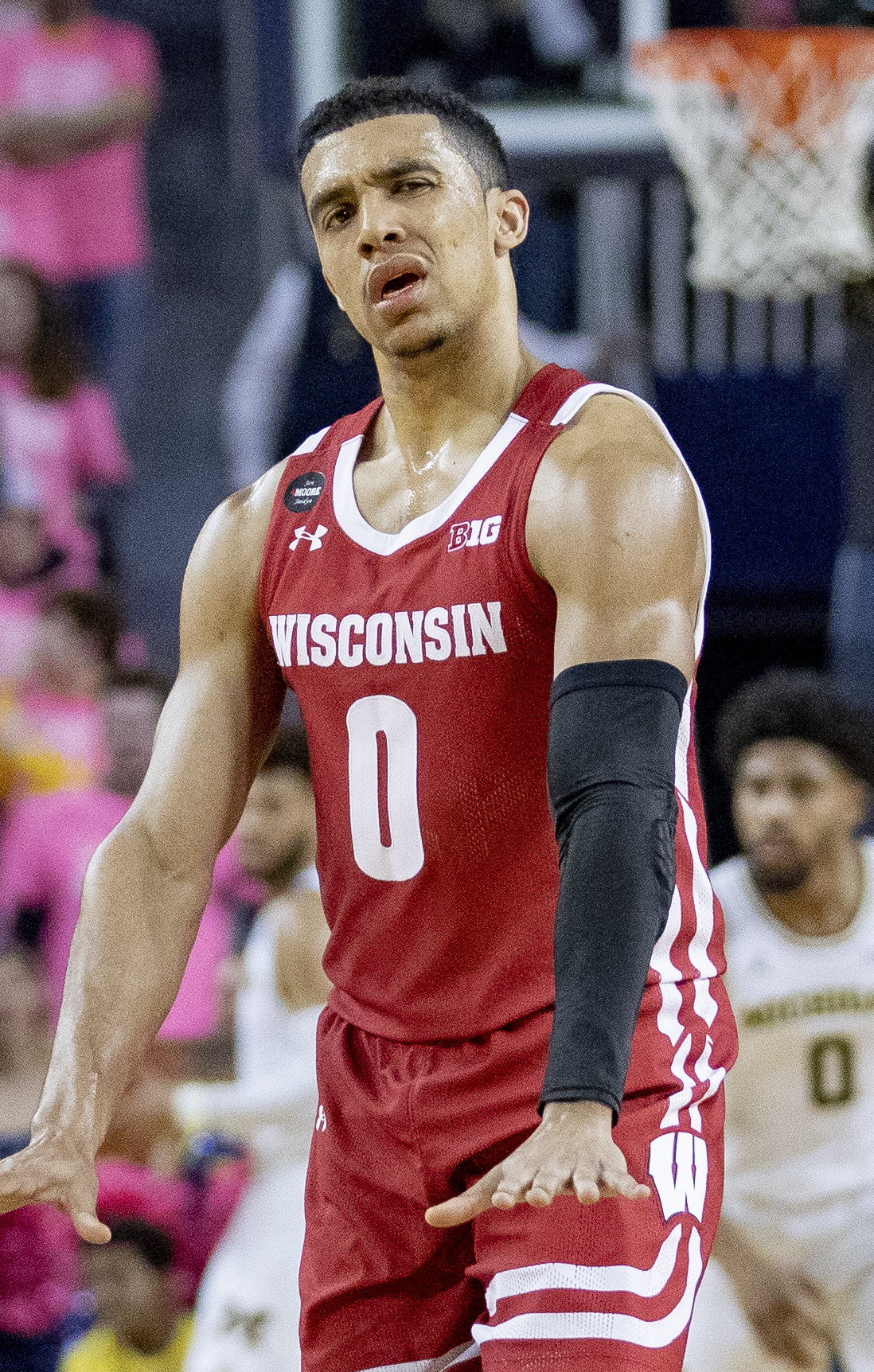
- Trice with the Wisconsin Badgers in 2020

No. 0 – BC Vienna
- Position: Point guard
- League: Austrian Basketball Superliga

Personal information
- Born: May 2, 1996 (age 30) Huber Heights, Ohio, U.S.
- Listed height: 6 ft 0 in (1.83 m)
- Listed weight: 184 lb (83 kg)

Career information
- High school: Wayne (Huber Heights, Ohio); IMG Academy (Bradenton, Florida)
- College: Wisconsin (2016–2021)
- NBA draft: 2021: undrafted
- Playing career: 2021–present

Career history
- 2021–2022: Fos Provence Basket
- 2022: Śląsk Wrocław
- 2022–2023: ZTE KK
- 2023–2024: Rabotnički
- 2024: AEK Larnaca
- 2024–2025: Patrioti Levic
- 2025–2026: Široki
- 2026: Rasta Vechta
- 2026–present: BC Vienna

Career highlights
- PLK champion (2022); 2× Third-team All-Big Ten – Coaches (2020, 2021); Third-team All-Big Ten – Media (2021)

D'Mitrik Alexander Trice (born May 2, 1996) is an American professional basketball player for BC Vienna of the Austrian Basketball Superliga. He played college basketball for the Wisconsin Badgers.

== High school career ==
Trice played basketball for Wayne High School in Huber Heights, Ohio under his father's coaching. As a senior, he averaged 10.3 points and 5.7 assists per game, leading his team to the Division I state title. Trice left as the school's all-time leader in assists. He was also the starting quarterback on Wayne's football team for two years, reaching the state championship game in his senior season. Trice played a postgraduate season of basketball at IMG Academy in Bradenton, Florida, averaging 12.3 points, 4.1 assists and four rebounds per game. He committed to play college basketball for Wisconsin over Ohio State and Vanderbilt.

== College career ==
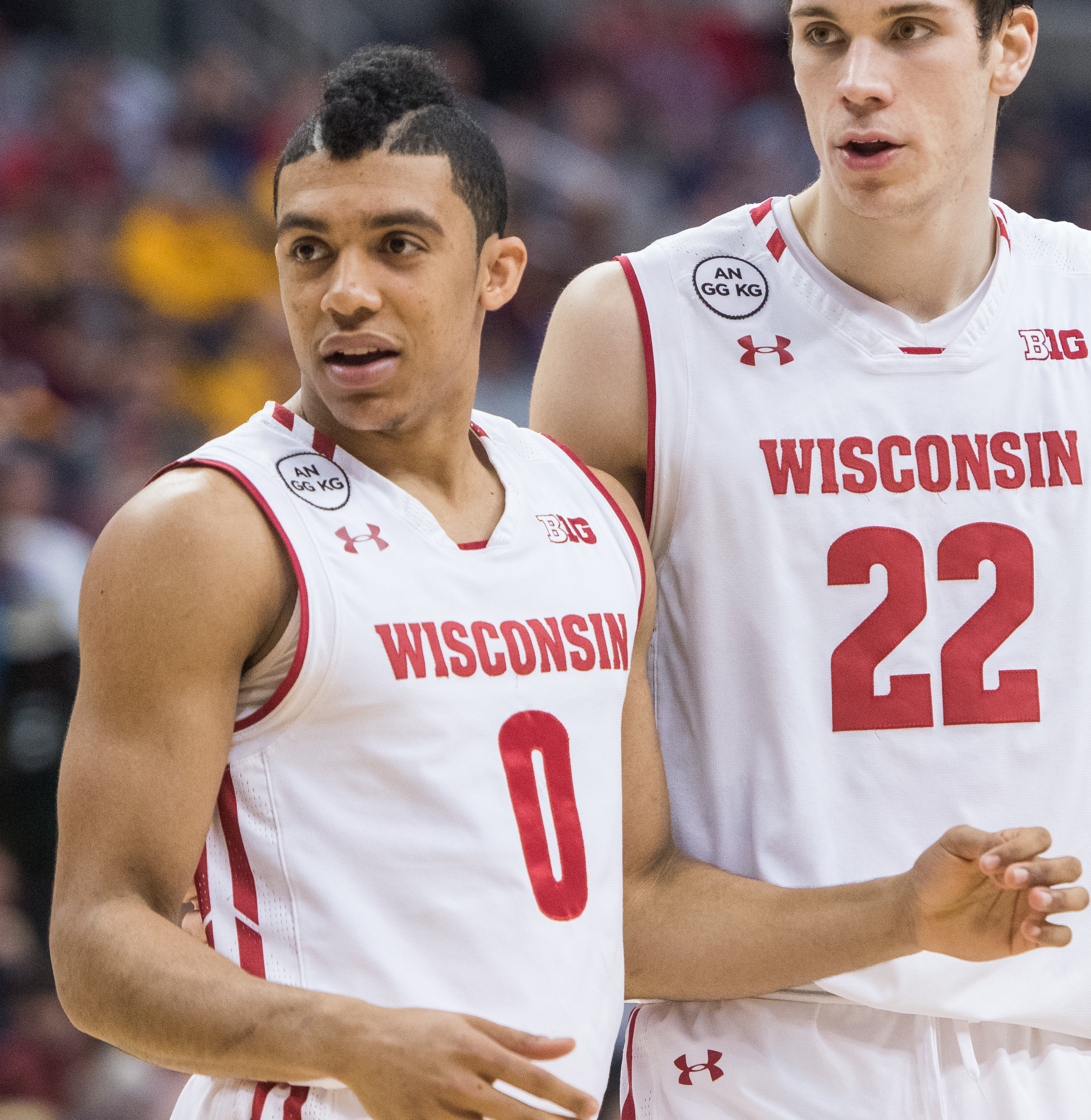
Trice (left) with Wisconsin in March 2017, during his freshman season

As a freshman at Wisconsin, Trice averaged 5.6 points and 1.7 assists in 18.3 minutes per game. He appeared in all 37 games and made two starts while Bronson Koenig was injured. Trice was averaging 9.4 points per game as a sophomore, but suffered a season-ending foot injury and was granted a medical redshirt after being limited to 10 games. On November 22, 2018, Trice scored a season-high 25 points, shooting 7-of-8 from three-point range, in a 78–58 win over Oklahoma at the Battle 4 Atlantis semifinals. In his redshirt sophomore season, he was Wisconsin's starting point guard in all 34 games, averaging 11.6 points and 2.8 assists per game, and was an All-Big Ten Honorable Mention pick.

On December 21, 2019, Trice scored a career-high 31 points in an 83–64 victory over Milwaukee. After Kobe King left the team following a loss to Purdue on January 24, 2020, Trice's production increased, and he posted 12 points, 5.8 rebounds and 6.3 assists per game during the next four games. He recorded 28 points and four assists in an 81–74 win over Michigan on February 27. As a junior, Trice averaged 9.8 points, four rebounds and 4.2 assists per game. He was named third-team All-Big Ten by the league's coaches and was an All-Big Ten Honorable Mention selection by the media. As a senior, Trice averaged 13.9 points and 4 assists per game, leading the Badgers to an 18–13 record and the Round of 32 of the NCAA Tournament.

== Professional career ==
On September 15, 2021, Trice signed with Fos Provence Basket of the LNB Pro A. In five games, he averaged 5.2 points, 1.4 assists, and 1.0 rebound per game.

On February 8, 2022, he has signed with Śląsk Wrocław of the Polish Basketball League, joining his older brother Travis. In the 2023-24 season, Trice joined Rabotnički and averaged 15.4 points and 5.8 assists per game. On December 6, 2024, he signed with BK Patrioti Levice of the Slovak Basketball League.

On June 26, 2026, he signed with Rasta Vechta of the German Basketball Bundesliga.

== Career statistics ==
Legend
GP	Games played	GS	Games started	MPG	Minutes per game
FG%	Field goal percentage	3P%	3-point field goal percentage	FT%	Free throw percentage
RPG	Rebounds per game	APG	Assists per game	SPG	Steals per game
BPG	Blocks per game	PPG	Points per game	**Bold**	Career high

=== College ===
Year	Team	GP	GS	MPG	FG%	3P%	FT%	RPG	APG	SPG	BPG	PPG
2016–17	Wisconsin	**37**	2	18.2	.380	**.418**	.789	1.9	1.7	.5	**.1**	5.6
2017–18	Wisconsin	10	10	31.5	.380	.300	.706	2.0	2.3	.6	**.1**	9.4
2018–19	Wisconsin	34	**34**	32.5	.384	.390	.750	2.8	2.6	**.9**	.0	11.6
2019–20	Wisconsin	31	31	32.2	.380	.376	.745	**4.0**	**4.2**	.8	**.1**	9.8
2020–21	Wisconsin	31	31	**33.3**	**.410**	.373	**.792**	3.4	4.0	.8	.0	**13.9**
Career		143	108	28.8	.390	.381	.767	2.9	3.0	.7	.1	10.0

== Personal life ==
Trice's older brother, Travis, played college basketball for Michigan State and now plays professionally. His father, Travis Sr., played the same sport for Purdue and Butler. His father's cousin is WNBA player Jackie Young. Trice's grandfather, Bob Pritchett, was an All-American basketball player for Old Dominion in the 1960s and is a member of the school's Sports Hall of Fame.
