= Tyree Kinnel =

American football player (born 1997)

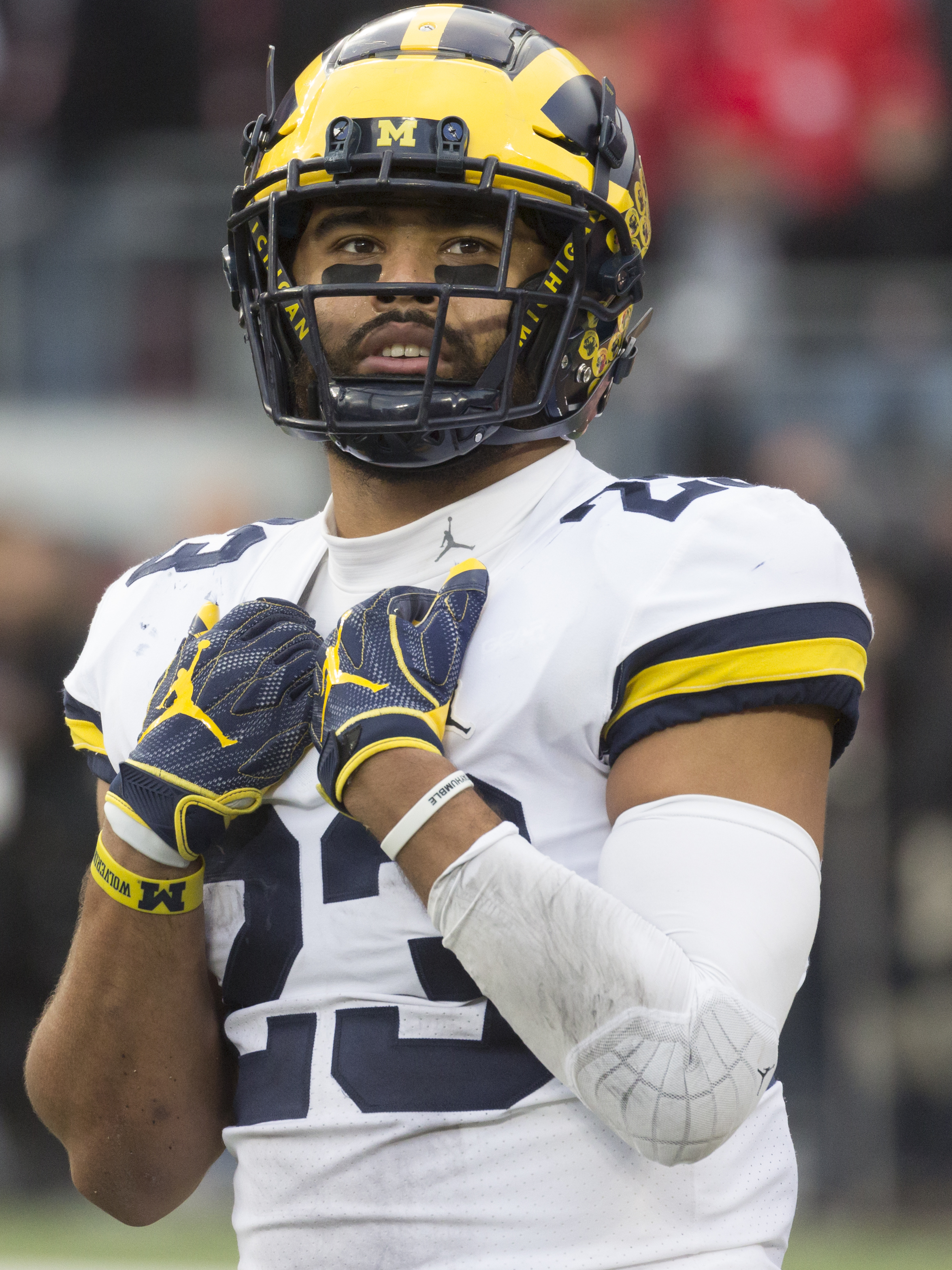
- Kinnel with Michigan in 2018

No. 43, 29
- Position: Safety

Personal information
- Born: January 31, 1997 (age 29); Huber Heights, Ohio, U.S.
- Listed height: 5 ft 11 in (1.80 m)
- Listed weight: 215 lb (98 kg)

Career information
- High school: Wayne (Huber Heights, Ohio)
- College: Michigan
- NFL draft: 2019: undrafted

Career history
- Cincinnati Bengals (2019)*; DC Defenders (2020); Pittsburgh Steelers (2020)*
- * Offseason or practice squad member only

Tyree Kinnel (born January 31, 1997) is an American former professional football player who was a safety in the National Football League (NFL). He played college football for the Michigan Wolverines.

== Early life ==
Kinnel grew up in Huber Heights, Ohio, and was an NFL fan, attending several Cincinnati Bengals games though he did not support a particular team. He had a brief youth wrestling career when he was younger. He attended Wayne High School. In football, Kinnel was regarded as a four-star prospect, ranked the No. 10 safety in his class and No. 1 safety in Ohio, according to Scout.com. He did not receive a scholarship offer from Ohio State, but instead committed to Michigan.

== College career ==
Kinnel played four seasons at the University of Michigan. He became a starter as a junior in 2017 and had 70 tackles, two interceptions, seven pass breakups, and a sack. He returned an interception for a 14-yard touchdown in 2017. Kinnel was named Michigan’s most improved defensive player. As a senior in 2018, he started 13 games and compiled 74 tackles with three for loss and two pass breakups. Kinnel was named Honorable Mention All-Big Ten as a junior and senior. During his career, Kinnel posted 154 tackles, nine tackles for loss, a sack, two interceptions and seven pass breakups.

== Professional career ==
After going undrafted in the 2019 NFL draft, Kinnel signed with the Cincinnati Bengals. He played in four preseason games, recording four tackles and two pass deflections. He was waived on August 31 as part of the final roster cuts. Kinnel later said that he wished he had signed with a different team.

Kinnel was selected in the eighth round of the 2020 XFL draft by the DC Defenders. In five games with the Defenders, Kinnel had 17 tackles. He had his contract terminated when the league suspended operations on April 10, 2020. On March 30, 2020, Kinnel signed with the Pittsburgh Steelers. He was waived on August 2, 2020.
