= Victor Heflin =

American football player (born 1960)

No. 46
- Position: Cornerback

Personal information
- Born: July 7, 1960 (age 66); Springfield, Massachusetts, U.S.
- Listed height: 6 ft 0 in (1.83 m)
- Listed weight: 184 lb (83 kg)

Career information
- High school: Wayne (Huber Heights, Ohio)
- College: Delaware State (1979–1982)
- NFL draft: 1983: 6th round, 143rd overall pick

Career history
- Denver Broncos (1983)*; St. Louis Cardinals (1983–1984); Miami Dolphins (1986)*
- * Offseason or practice squad member only

Career NFL statistics
- Interceptions: 1
- Stats at Pro Football Reference

Victor Heflin (born July 7, 1960) is an American former professional football player who was a cornerback for two seasons with the St. Louis Cardinals of the National Football League (NFL). He was selected by the Denver Broncos in the sixth round of the 1983 NFL draft. He played college football for the Delaware State Hornets.

== Early life and college ==
Victor Heflin was born on July 7, 1960, in Springfield, Massachusetts. He attended Wayne High School in Huber Heights, Ohio.

He was a member of the Hornets at Delaware State University from 1979 to 1982. He led the team in interceptions in 1982. He was inducted into Delaware State's athletics hall of fame in 2010.

== Professional career ==
Heflin was selected by the Denver Broncos in the sixth round, with the 143rd overall pick, of the 1983 NFL draft. He officially signed with the team on May 11. He was released on August 23, 1983.

Heflin signed with the St. Louis Cardinals on October 27, 1983. He played in eight games for the Cardinals during the 1983 season. He appeared in all 16 games in 1984, recording one interception. He was released by the Cardinals on August 26, 1985.

Heflin was signed by the Miami Dolphins on April 1, 1986. He was released on May 7, 1986.

== Personal life ==
Heflin is the brother of former NFL player Vince Heflin.
