= Vince Heflin =

American football player (born 1959)

No. 83 / 88 / 89
- Position: Wide receiver

Personal information
- Born: July 7, 1959 (age 67); Dayton, Ohio, U.S.
- Listed height: 6 ft 0 in (1.83 m)
- Listed weight: 185 lb (84 kg)

Career information
- High school: Wayne (Huber Heights, Ohio)
- College: Central State
- NFL draft: 1982: undrafted

Career history
- Miami Dolphins (1982–1985); Tampa Bay Buccaneers (1986)
- Stats at Pro Football Reference

Vince Heflin (born July 7, 1959) is an American former professional football player who was a wide receiver for five seasons in the National Football League (NFL) with the Tampa Bay Buccaneers and Miami Dolphins. Heflin attended Wayne High School in Huber Heights, Ohio, and played college football for the Central State Marauders.

He is the brother of former NFL defensive back Victor Heflin.
