= Kyle Swords =

American soccer player

Personal information
- Full name: Kyle Matthew Swords
- Date of birth: August 22, 1974 (age 52)
- Place of birth: Dayton, Ohio, United States
- Height: 6 ft 0 in (1.83 m)
- Position: Defender

Youth career
- 1992–1996: James Madison Dukes

Senior career*
Years	Team	Apps	(Gls)
1997–2001	Hershey Wildcats	117	(6)
1997–2001	Harrisburg Heat (indoor)	119	(33)
2002	Charleston Battery	24	(0)
2003	Baltimore Blast (indoor)	6	(1)
2004	Harrisburg City Islanders	15	(1)
Total		281	(41)
- * Club domestic league appearances and goals

Kyle Swords (Swordsy) is a retired American soccer defender who played professionally in the USL A-League and National Professional Soccer League.

Swords was born in Dayton, Ohio. He attended Wayne High School (class of 1992) in the Dayton suburb of Huber Heights and was an inaugural member of the Wayne Athletic Hall of Fame in 2002.

Swords attended James Madison University, playing on the men's soccer team from 1992 to 1996. In 1997, he turned professional with the expansion Hershey Wildcats in the USISL A-League. Swords would play every season of the Wildcats five-year existence. In 2001, the Wildcats fell to the Rochester Rhinos in the 2001 A-League championship. Swords was the A-League.com Defender of the Year that same season. Swords also played indoor soccer beginning in the fall of 1997. That year, he joined the Harrisburg Heat of the National Professional Soccer League. He was selected to the 1997-98 All Rookie Team and is a member of the Harrisburg Heat All-Decade Team. The Heat traded him to the Baltimore Blast following the 2000–2001 season and the Wildcats withdrew from the league in the fall of 2001. On January 11, 2002, Swords signed with the Charleston Battery for the 2002 season. On February 1, 2003, he joined the Baltimore Blast for the second half of the Major Indoor Soccer League season. The Blast won the league title, that season. In 2004, Swords finished his career with a single season with the Harrisburg City Islanders of the USL Second Division.

Following his retirement from professional soccer, Swords entered the coaching ranks. From 2004 to 2007, he coached the Loyola Blakefield High School boys' team, winning the 2005 Maryland state champs. He later served as a volunteer assistant with the University of Cincinnati women's team.
