= Huber Heights, Ohio =

- City
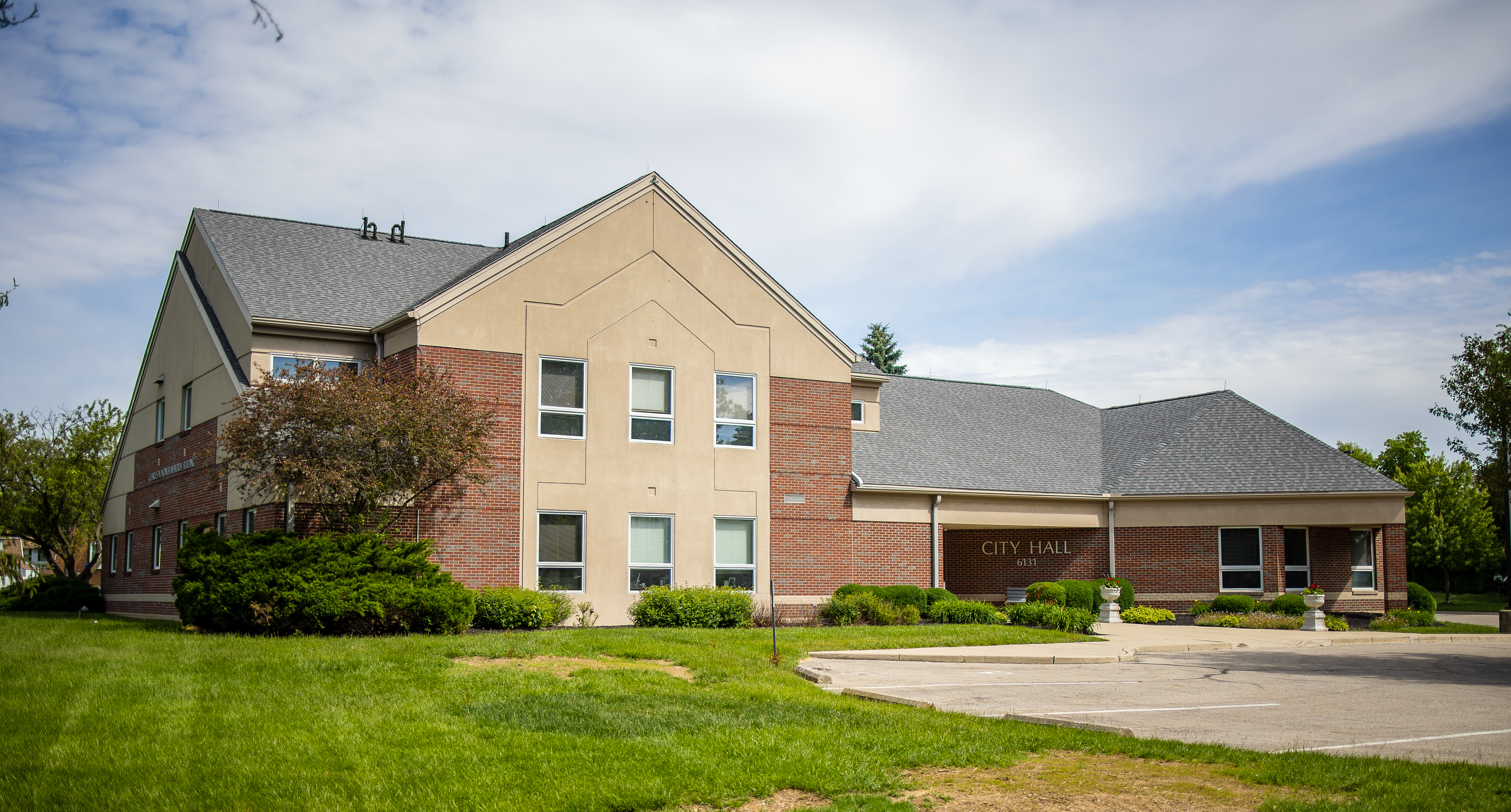
- Huber Heights City Hall

- Flag Seal
- Nicknames: Brick City, Huber, The Heights
- Motto: "Come Grow With Us!"
- Interactive map of Huber Heights, Ohio
- Location within Ohio Location within the United States
- Coordinates: 39°51′35″N 84°07′39″W
- Country: United States
- State: Ohio
- Counties: Montgomery, Miami
- Incorporated: January 23, 1981

Government
  - Mayor: Jeff Gore (R)
  - City manager: Richard S. Dzik

Area
  - Total: 22.37 sq mi (57.94 km^{2})
  - Land: 22.20 sq mi (57.50 km^{2})
  - Water: 0.17 sq mi (0.44 km^{2})
- Elevation: 991 ft (302 m)

Population (2020)
  - Total: 43,439
  - Density: 1,956.6/sq mi (755.45/km^{2})
- Time zone: UTC-5 (Eastern (EST))
  - Summer (DST): UTC-4 (EDT)
- ZIP code: 45424
- Area codes: 937, 326
- FIPS code: 39-36610
- GNIS feature ID: 1086669
- Website: www.hhoh.org

Huber Heights is a city in Montgomery and Miami counties in the U.S. state of Ohio. It is a suburb of Dayton. The population was 43,439 at the 2020 census. This was a 14% increase since the 2010 census, making it the largest growth in Montgomery County in the last decade.

== History ==
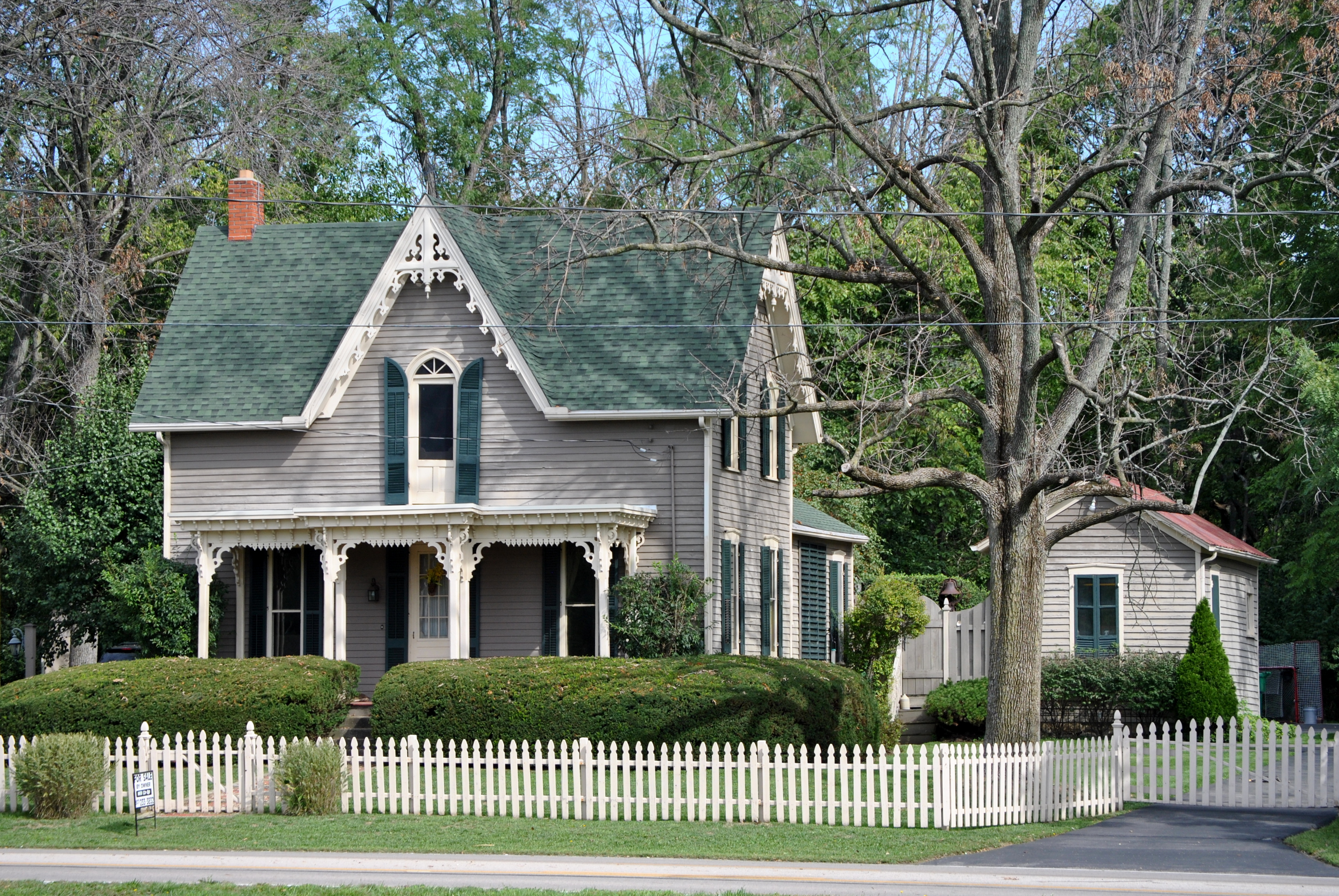
Ausenbaugh–McElhenny House

Huber Heights' origins trace back to the now-defunct Wayne Township, which was settled in the early to mid-1800s. Wayne Township was incorporated as the City of Huber Heights on January 23, 1981. The city is named for Charles Huber, the developer who constructed a number of the houses that later constituted the city. Suburban development began in the area in 1956. Huber Heights continued to grow by annexing parcels in Miami County.

== Geography ==
Most of Huber Heights is in Montgomery County, while the city has more recently annexed land in Miami County. One small parcel of the city was located in Greene County, but it was detached from the city in 2013.

According to the United States Census Bureau, the city has a total area of 22.37 square miles (57.94 km^{2}), of which about 61 acres (25 ha) are covered by water.

== Demographics ==
Historical population
Census	Pop.	Note	%±
1970	18,943		—
1980	34,642		82.9%
1990	38,696		11.7%
2000	38,212		−1.3%
2010	38,101		−0.3%
2020	43,439		14.0%
Population 1970-2000.

=== 2020 census ===
As of the 2020 census, Huber Heights had a population of 43,439. The median age was 38.2 years. 23.8% of residents were under the age of 18 and 16.9% of residents were 65 years of age or older. For every 100 females there were 94.7 males, and for every 100 females age 18 and over there were 91.3 males age 18 and over.

97.5% of residents lived in urban areas, while 2.5% lived in rural areas.

There were 17,048 households in Huber Heights, of which 31.3% had children under the age of 18 living in them. Of all households, 46.8% were married-couple households, 17.7% were households with a male householder and no spouse or partner present, and 27.6% were households with a female householder and no spouse or partner present. About 25.8% of all households were made up of individuals and 10.5% had someone living alone who was 65 years of age or older.

There were 17,816 housing units, of which 4.3% were vacant. The homeowner vacancy rate was 1.0% and the rental vacancy rate was 5.5%.

Racial composition as of the 2020 census
Race	Number	Percent
White	31,069	71.5%
Black or African American	6,724	15.5%
American Indian and Alaska Native	127	0.3%
Asian	1,341	3.1%
Native Hawaiian and Other Pacific Islander	32	0.1%
Some other race	737	1.7%
Two or more races	3,409	7.8%
Hispanic or Latino (of any race)	1,700	3.9%

=== 2010 census ===
As of the census of 2010, 38,101 people, 14,720 households, and 10,552 families resided in the city. The population density was 1,710.9 inhabitants per square mile (660.6/km^{2}). The 15,875 housing units had an average density of 712.8 per square mile (275.2/km^{2}). The racial makeup of the city was 79.6% White, 13.0% African American, 0.3% Native American, 2.5% Asian, 0.1% Pacific Islander, 1.0% from other races, and 3.5% from two or more races. Hispanic or Latino residents of any race were 3.1% of the population.

Of the 14,720 households, 35.8% had children under 18 living with them, 51.5% were married couples living together, 14.9% had a female householder with no husband present, 5.3% had a male householder with no wife present, and 28.3% were not families. About 22.8% of all households were made up of individuals, and 8.1% had someone living alone who was 65 or older. The average household size was 2.58, and the average family size was 3.01.

The median age in the city was 37.4 years; The age distribution was 25.4% under 18; 8.2% from 18 to 24, 26.3% from 25 to 44, 27.2% from 45 to 64; and 12.9% were 65 or older. The gender makeup of the city was 48.3% male and 51.7% female.

=== 2000 census ===
As of the census of 2000, 38,212 people, 14,392 households, and 10,779 families were residing in the city. The population density was 1,817.2/sq mi (701.6/km^{2}). The 14,938 housing units had an average density of 710.4/sq mi (274.3/km^{2}). The racial makeup of the city was 84.88% White, 9.78% African American, 0.28% Native American, 2.18% Asian, 0.64% from other races, and 2.25% from two or more races. Hispanic or Latino residents of any race were 1.66% of the population.

Of the 14,392 households, 36.9% had children under 18 living with them, 58.7% were married couples living together, 12.0% had a female householder with no husband present, and 25.1% were nont amilies. About 20.5% of all households were made up of individuals, and 5.9% had someone living alone who was 65 or older. The average household size was 2.64, and the average family size was 3.05.

In the city, the age distribution was 27.4% under 18, 8.6% from 18 to 24, 31.1% from 25 to 44, 23.7% from 45 to 64, and 9.3% who were 65 or older. The median age was 34 years. For every 100 females, there were 95.0 males. For every 100 females 18 and over, there were 91.8 males.

The median income for a household in the city was $49,073, and for a family was $53,579. Males had a median income of $40,099 versus $28,723 for females. The per capita income for the city was $20,951. About 4.2% of families and 5.9% of the population were below the poverty line, including 6.6% of those under age 18 and 5.6% of those age 65 or over.

== Economy ==
Huber Heights' location near the intersection of I-70 and I-75 has long made it an attractive hub for the trucking industry. With two exits on I-70, many popular chain restaurants exist near the exits. Also, various strip malls are in Huber Heights. Marian Shopping Center, located near the intersection of Brandt Pike and Fishburg Road, is slated for redevelopment, which the city purchased for $2.8 million.

The city chamber of commerce notes these large businesses as operating within the city: ABF Freight System, Inc. Apache Technologies, Dayton Freight, NDC Technologies, AIDA/DTC, Bowser Morner, Coca-Cola, Enginetics, Fukuvi USA, Hughes-Peters, Metokote, and Trimble Navigation.

In January 2013, Magnetar Capital bought 1,900 properties in Huber Heights from the family of the original developer. It rents these homes as part of its overall investment strategy. About one in every 11 homes in the city is owned by the firm.

In April 2026, Texas travel center/convenience site chain Buc-ee's opened a location in Huber Heights. This is the first Buc-ee's location in Ohio.

=== Top employers ===
According to the city's 2023 Annual Comprehensive Financial Report, the top employers in the city are:

#	Employer	# of Employees
1	Huber Heights City School District	1,015
2	Walmart	633
3	Trimble	625
4	ABF Freight System	572
5	Meijer	523
6	Adecco USA	520
7	FedEx Freight	398
8	McDonald's	374
9	City of Huber Heights	343
10	Home Care Huber Heights	338

== Education ==
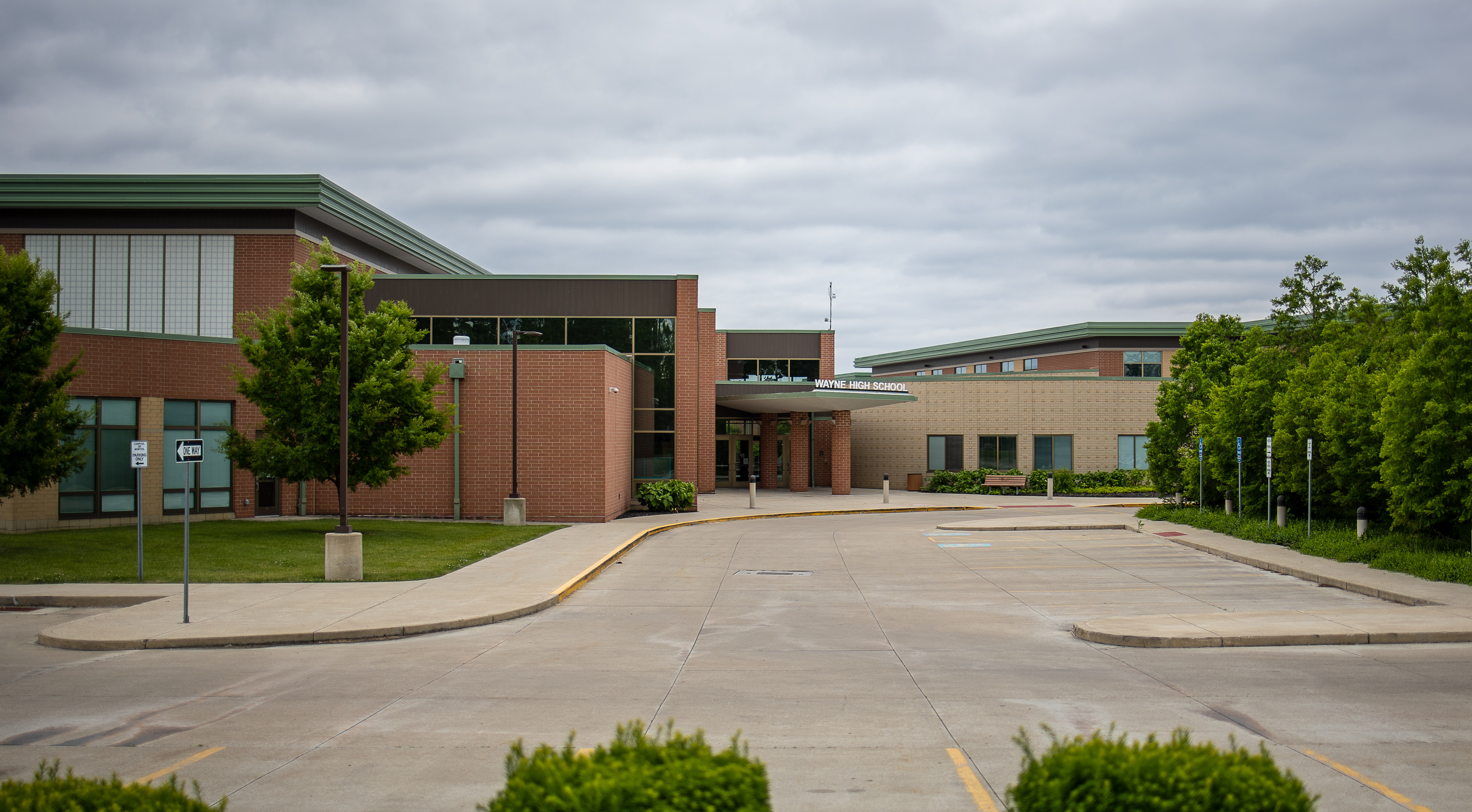
Wayne High School

Two public school districts serve Huber Heights. Residents living in the Montgomery County portion of Huber Heights are served by the Huber Heights City School District, which includes five elementary schools, one middle schools, and Wayne High School. Those residents living in the Miami County portion of Huber Heights are served by the Bethel Local Schools District.

Huber Heights has a new public library, a branch of the Dayton Metro Library.

== Transportation ==
Public transit in the city is provided by the Greater Dayton Regional Transit Authority.

== Notable people ==
- Will Allen, former safety for the Pittsburgh Steelers
- Jamier Brown, five-star football recruit, one of the top prospects in the class of 2027
- George Crook, Civil War general, born on family farm at corner of Chambersburg and Endicott Roads
- Kelley Deal, musician, The Breeders
- Kim Deal, musician, The Breeders
- Dallas Egbert, 16-year-old child prodigy
- Cam Fancher, quarterback for the Florida Atlantic Owls, previously played for the Marshall Thundering Herd
- Marcus Freeman, head coach Notre Dame Football; former Ohio State linebacker
- Bree Hall, college basketball player for the South Carolina Gamecocks, former McDonald's All-American, former Ohio Ms. Basketball
- Victor Heflin, former NFL defensive back, St. Louis Cardinals
- Vince Heflin, former NFL wide receiver, Miami Dolphins and Tampa Bay Buccaneers
- Tyree Kinnel, former University of Michigan safety, former NFL practice squad player
- Trey Landers, professional basketball player, played college basketball for the Dayton Flyers
- Mike Mickens, former NFL cornerback, currently cornerbacks coach for the University of Notre Dame
- Braxton Miller, former quarterback and wide receiver for the Ohio State Buckeyes, former NFL wide receiver
- Greg Orton, former Purdue University wide receiver, former NFL wide receiver
- Teresa Pace, Institute of Electrical and Electronics Engineers Fellow
- Kofi Sarkodie, defender for San Jose Earthquakes in Major League Soccer
- Kyle Swords, former professional soccer player
- D'Mitrik Trice, former point guard for University of Wisconsin men's basketball
- Travis Trice, former Michigan State basketball player
- Larry Turner, former NFL offensive lineman, St. Louis Rams and Cincinnati Bengals
- Xeyrius Williams, professional basketball player
- Jerel Worthy, defensive tackle for the Buffalo Bills

== Sister cities ==
Huber Heights has two sister cities, as designated by Sister Cities International:

- – Rheinsberg, Brandenburg, Germany
- – Dover, England, United Kingdom

== See also ==
- Arnold Homestead
- Ausenbaugh-McElhenny House
- Huber Heights City School District
- Wayne High School (Ohio)
