= Jamier Brown =

American football player

Wayne Warriors
- Position: Wide receiver

Personal information
- Listed height: 5 ft 10 in (1.78 m)
- Listed weight: 192 lb (87 kg)

Career information
- High school: Wayne (Huber Heights, Ohio); Big Walnut (Sunbury, Ohio)

Jamier Averette-Brown is an American football wide receiver at Wayne High School in Huber Heights, Ohio. He is a five-star recruit and one of the top prospects in the class of 2027.

== Early life ==
Brown first attended Wayne High School in Huber Heights, Ohio, where he played football as a wide receiver and participated in track and field as a sprinter. During his freshman year, he recorded 512 receiving yards with four touchdowns and also set a national freshman record in the 60 metres with a time of 6.75 seconds. Brown was the Adidas Track Nationals champion in the 60 metres. He then was a second-team all-state honoree as a sophomore after totaling 63 receptions for 1,035 yards with 13 touchdowns, finishing as the leading receiver in the Greater Western Ohio Conference. Brown was a first-team all-state selection as a junior in 2025 when he caught 73 passes for 1,009 yards and 10 touchdowns.

Midway through his junior year, Brown transferred to Big Walnut High School in Sunbury, Ohio. That Spring he competed in Track and Field, leading Big Walnut to the Division II state co-championship. Brown won the 100 and 200-meter events, along with anchoring the 4x100 relay champions.

In August 2026 Brown transferred back to Wayne for his senior year. He was subsequently suspended for the first two games of the year due to Ohio High School Athletic Association (OHSAA) rules violations.

Brown was a major figure in a lawsuit against OHSAA regarding whether high school athletes could earn name, image, and likeness (NIL) money. The lawsuit, filed by his mother in October 2025, stated that he was prevented from earning over $100,000 in NIL contracts due to OHSAA restrictions. The following month, the OHSAA approved athletes receiving NIL money, the 45th state to do so.

A five-star recruit, Brown is ranked one of the top receivers and a top-20 prospect nationally in the class of 2027. He committed to play college football for the Ohio State Buckeyes.
