= Wayne High School (Ohio) =

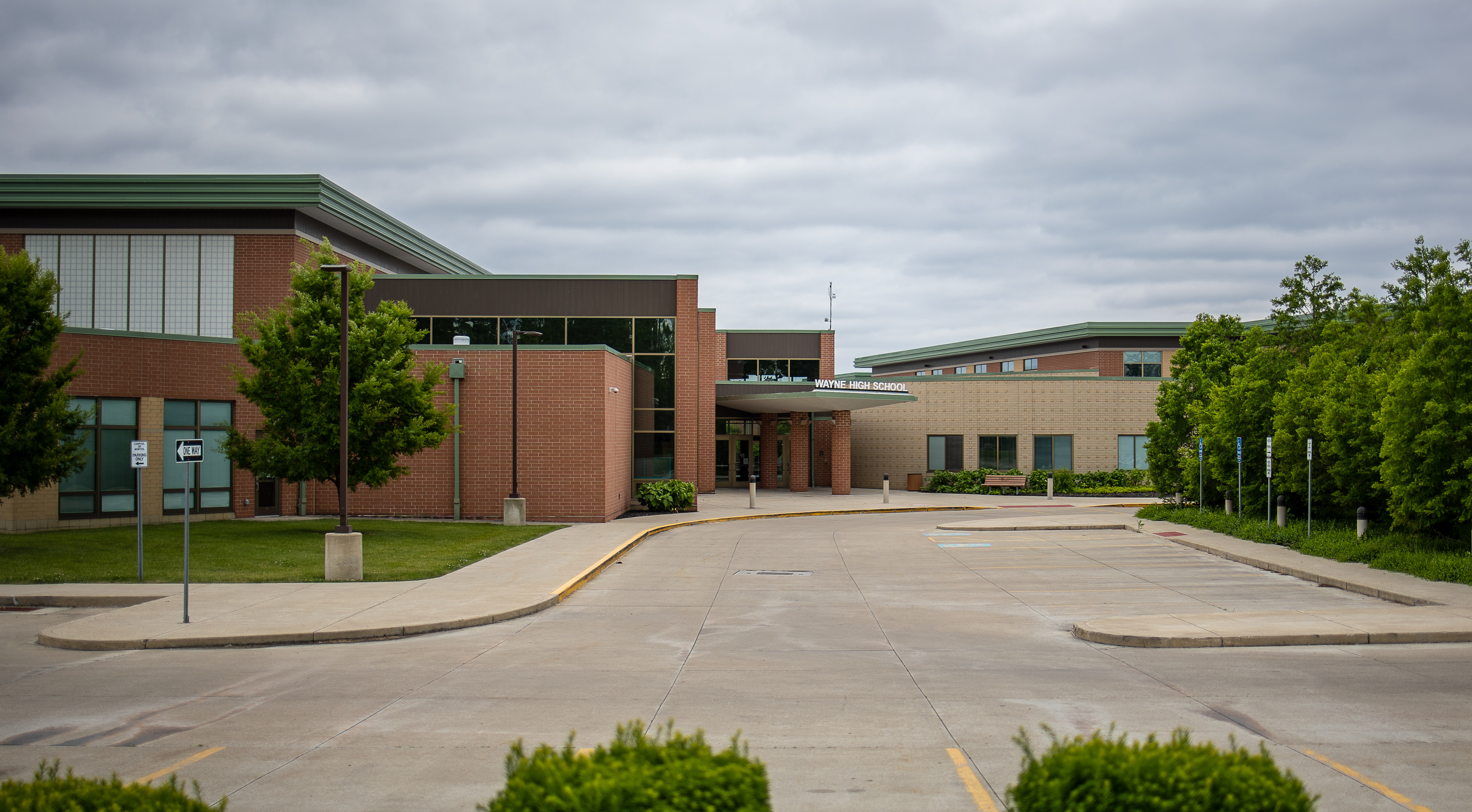
- 5400 Chambersburg Road, Huber Heights, OH 45424

Information
- Type: Public
- Established: 1956
- School district: Huber Heights City Schools
- Principal: Brent Carey
- Teaching staff: 86.38 (FTE)
- Grades: 9-12
- Enrollment: 1,759 (2023-2024)
- Student to teacher ratio: 20.36
- Colors: Red, white, and black
- Mascot: Warrior
- Information: Located Northeast of Dayton, Ohio
- Website: wayne.myhhcs.org

Wayne High School is a secondary public school located in Huber Heights, Ohio, north of Dayton, Ohio. With the high school being established in 1956, the school district was formerly known as Wayne Township Local School District. In 1982, the district's name changed to Huber Heights City School District when the majority of Wayne Township was turned into Huber Heights City. In February 2021, Ohio Treasurer Robert Sprague named the school one of three Ohio Compass Award honorees of the month for its financial education curriculum and partnership with Sinclair Community College with its College Credit Plus program.

== Facilities ==
The construction of new buildings for five elementary schools, a new junior high, and a new high school was completed in 2012. Usage of the new high school building began in January 2013. Before then, there was a second junior high school which is now an independent preschool/ central district office.

The five elementary schools and single junior high that feed Wayne High School are as follows:

- Charles Huber Elementary
- Monticello Elementary
- Rushmore Elementary
- Valley Forge Elementary
- Wright Brothers Elementary
- Weisenborn Junior High

The old high school comprised seven separate single-story buildings connected by covered walkways: Filbrun Hall (including the cafeteria, library, music rehearsal hall, and woodworking and metalworking shops), Hawke Hall, Storck Hall, Douglass Hall, Shank Hall, Alumni Hall, and the Gymnasium and Auditorium.

The Gymnasium and Auditorium were retained for continued usage.

The new building covers approximately 292,000 square feet. The building includes a new and larger gymnasium. It also includes a new and larger cafeteria.

== Athletics ==
Wayne High School competes interscholastically in boys and girls sports as a member of the Greater Western Ohio Conference (GWOC). The Warriors primary league rival is Centerville High School.

In its 65+ year history, Wayne's varsity football team has won several conference championships and has played in the OHSAA playoff tournament 23 times. In 1999, 2010, 2014, and 2015, the team made it to the Division I state championship game, completing the season as State Runner-Up all four times.

The football and soccer teams play home games at Good Samaritan Athletic Field at Heidkamp Stadium.

=== Ohio High School Athletic Association State Championships ===
- Boys gymnastics - 1973, 1975, 1976
- Boys track and field – 1995, 2000, 2025, 2026
- Boys basketball - 2015
- Boys Bowling - 2016
- Girls track and field - 2024

== Notable alumni ==
- Will Allen – former NFL safety for the Pittsburgh Steelers
- Jamier Brown (Class of 2027) – five-star football recruit, one of the top prospects in the class of 2027
- Kelley Deal – musician, The Breeders
- Kim Deal – musician, The Breeders
- Dallas Egbert – sixteen-year-old child prodigy whose four-week disappearance in 1979 was incorrectly attributed to steam tunnels and Dungeons & Dragons
- Cam Fancher – quarterback for the UCF Knights, previously played for the Marshall Thundering Herd and the Florida Atlantic Owls
- Marcus Freeman – head coach Notre Dame Football; former Ohio State linebacker
- Bree Hall – college basketball player for the South Carolina Gamecocks, former McDonald's All-American, former Ohio Ms. Basketball
- Victor Heflin – former NFL defensive back, St. Louis Cardinals
- Vince Heflin – former NFL wide receiver, Miami Dolphins and Tampa Bay Buccaneers
- Tyree Kinnel – former University of Michigan safety, former NFL practice squad player
- Trey Landers – professional basketball player, played college basketball for the Dayton Flyers
- Mike Mickens – former NFL cornerback, currently cornerbacks coach for the University of Notre Dame
- Braxton Miller – former Ohio State quarterback
- Greg Orton – former Purdue University wide receiver, former NFL wide receiver, Super Bowl Champion with the New England Patriots.
- Megan Stalter – comedian and actress, Hacks, Too Much
- Kyle Swords – former professional soccer player
- Teresa Pace, PhD – Institute of Electrical and Electronics Engineers (IEEE) Fellow, past president of IEEE Aerospace and Electronic Systems Society
- Evan Tengesdahl – college football guard for the Cincinnati Bearcats
- D'Mitrik Trice – professional basketball player, played college basketball for the Wisconsin Badgers
- Travis Trice – professional basketball player, played college basketball for the Michigan State Spartans
- Adam Trick – college football linebacker for the Texas Tech Red Raiders
- Larry Turner – former NFL offensive lineman, played college football for the Eastern Kentucky Colonels
- Aamil Wagner – college football offensive tackle for the Notre Dame Fighting Irish
- Xeyrius Williams – professional basketball player, played college basketball for the Dayton Flyers and the Akron Zips
- Jerel Worthy – former NFL defensive tackle, played college football for the Michigan State Spartans
