= Jerel Worthy =

American football player (born 1990)

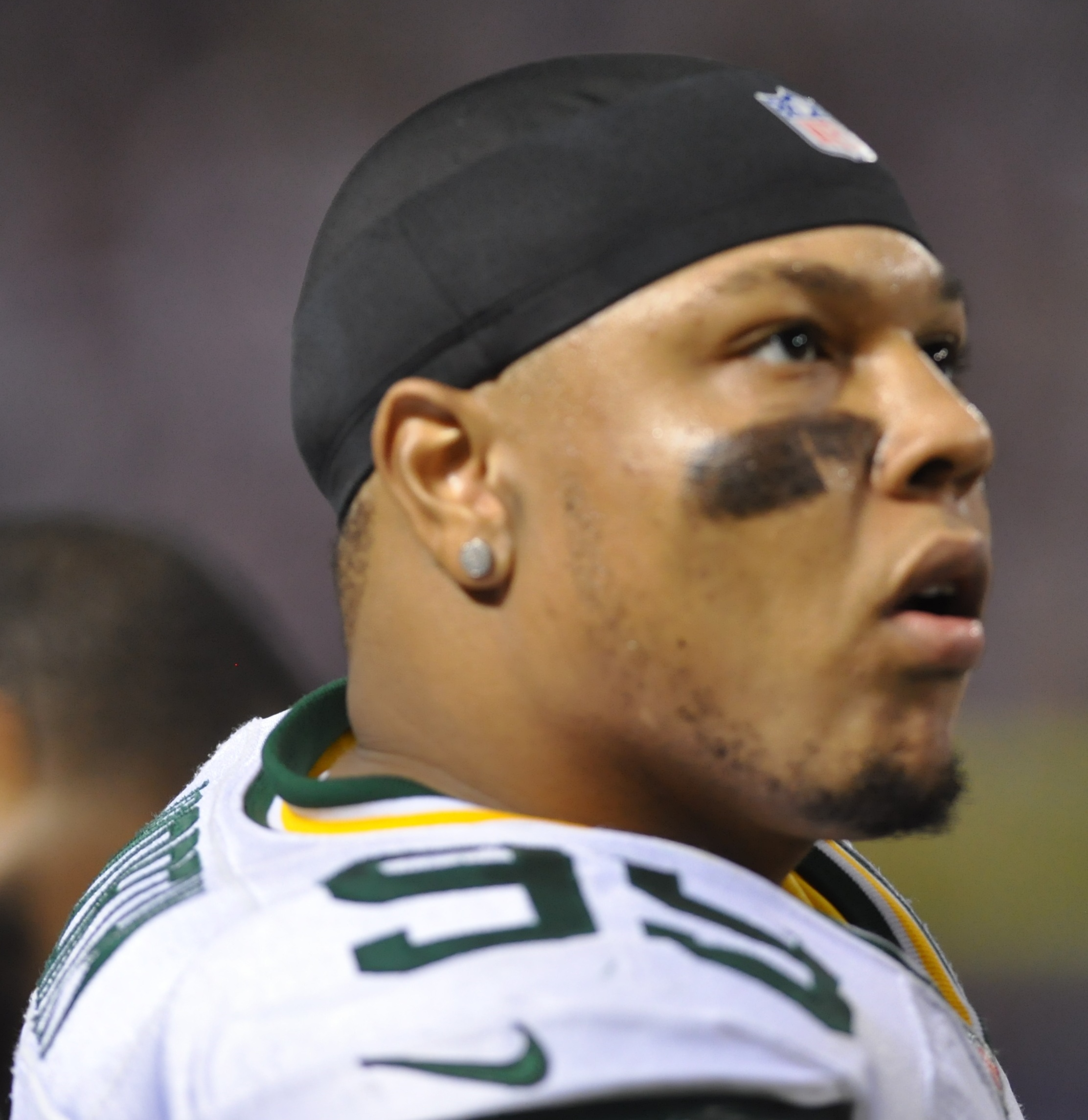
- Worthy with the Green Bay Packers in 2012

No. 56, 69, 94, 99
- Position: Defensive tackle

Personal information
- Born: April 26, 1990 (age 36); Dayton, Ohio, U.S.
- Listed height: 6 ft 2 in (1.88 m)
- Listed weight: 300 lb (136 kg)

Career information
- High school: Wayne (Huber Heights, Ohio)
- College: Michigan State (2008–2011)
- NFL draft: 2012: 2nd round, 51st overall pick

Career history
- Green Bay Packers (2012–2013); New England Patriots (2014)*; Kansas City Chiefs (2014–2015)*; Detroit Lions (2015)*; Buffalo Bills (2015–2017); Tampa Bay Buccaneers (2018); Orlando Apollos (2019)
- * Offseason or practice squad member only

Awards and highlights
- Consensus All-American (2011); First-team All-Big Ten (2011)

Career NFL statistics
- Total tackles: 35
- Sacks: 2.5
- Forced fumbles: 1
- Stats at Pro Football Reference

Jerel Nicholas Worthy (born April 26, 1990) is an American former professional football player who was a defensive tackle in the National Football League (NFL). He played college football for the Michigan State Spartans, earning consensus All-American honors. He was selected by the Green Bay Packers in the second round of the 2012 NFL draft.

== Early life ==
Worthy was born in Dayton, Ohio. He originally attended Chaminade-Julienne High School in Dayton, Ohio but then transferred to Wayne High School in Huber Heights, where he played high school football for the Wayne Warriors. As a senior for the Warriors, Worthy recorded 50 tackles, 10.5 sacks and 12 hurries. Worthy was also responsible for seven pass breakups and two fumble recoveries

Worthy's performance during his senior season earned him a spot on the Superprep and Prepstars Midwest Teams.

== College career ==
=== Recruiting ===
Coming out of High School, Worthy was ranked the 53rd Best Defensive Tackle by Rivals.com, 78th by Scout.com, and 93rd by Scouts Inc. He was also invited to play June 14 Big 33 Football Classic. Worthy received scholarship offers from Michigan State, Akron, Cincinnati, Marshall, Nebraska, and Ohio. He was six foot two inches, 288 pounds, ran the 40-yard dash in 4.9 seconds who bench pressed a maximum of 335 pounds and squatted a maximum of 470 pounds. He had a 2.8 Grade-point average.

=== Michigan State ===
Worthy attended Michigan State University, where he played for the Michigan State Spartans football team from 2009 to 2011. Worthy was redshirted for his freshman year but was still named the scout team defensive player of the week versus Eastern Michigan. Coming on to the scene in 2009, he started 11 of 13 games and ranked second on the team for tackles for loss and sacks. He was named a midseason All-Big Ten and All-American by Phil Steele. At the end of the season, he was named as a freshman All-American

As a sophomore, Worthy started all 13 games at defensive tackle and lead the linemen with 40 tackles, eight of which went for a loss. He also had a team best four sacks. He was a collegefootballnews.com All-Sophomore second-team selection, honorable mention Big-Ten selection by the coaches and media, and was presented Michigan State's Outstanding Underclassman Award.

For what turned out to be his final season at Michigan State, Worthy had 30 tackles (10.5 for loss), 3.5 sacks, 10 quarterback hurries, and 14 hits during the regular season. He was named a consensus first-team All-American honors by the Associated Press. He was also an All-Big ten selection from the coaches and media. Worthy became the first defensive tackle since Ronald Curl in 1971 to be named an All-American at Michigan State.

On January 4, 2012, Worthy announced he would forgo his senior season and enter the 2012 NFL draft.

== Professional career ==
=== Pre-draft ===
Worthy was predicted to be a late first round to second round draft pick. Scouts talked about his size and called him thick and powerful. They also stated that he had enough speed to "shoot through the gap" Scouts also discussed his inconsistency and that his reputation was better than his actual production. It was also stated that he struggled in space and could not translate his weight enough to make tackles on the ball carrier.

Pre-draft measurables
Height	Weight	Arm length	Hand span	Wingspan	40-yard dash	10-yard split	20-yard split	20-yard shuttle	Three-cone drill	Vertical jump	Broad jump	Bench press
6 ft 2 3/8 in (1.89 m)	308 lb (140 kg)	33 in (0.84 m)	9 3/8 in (0.24 m)	6 ft 7 7/8 in (2.03 m)	5.06 s	1.77 s	2.85 s	4.56 s	7.60 s	28.5 in (0.72 m)	8 ft 11 in (2.72 m)	28 reps
All values from NFL Combine/Pro Day

=== Green Bay Packers ===
During the second round of the 2012 NFL draft the Green Bay Packers traded the 59th overall pick and a fourth round selection to move up in the draft and select Worthy with the 51st overall pick.

=== New England Patriots ===
On August 12, 2014, Worthy was traded to the New England Patriots for a conditional late round draft choice in the 2015 NFL draft, pending a physical. He was waived by the Patriots on August 30, 2014.

=== Kansas City Chiefs ===
On September 9, 2014, Worthy signed with the Kansas City Chiefs' practice squad. He was released on October 21, 2014, but re-signed to the practice squad 5 days later. On December 31, he signed a futures contract with the Chiefs. He was waived on August 3, 2015.

=== Detroit Lions ===
After being placed on waivers by the Chiefs, the Detroit Lions claimed Worthy on August 4, 2015. The Detroit Lions cut Worthy from the team on September 5, 2015, at the 53 man roster deadline.

=== Buffalo Bills ===
On November 24, 2015, Worthy was signed to the Buffalo Bills' practice squad. On December 22, 2015, Worthy was signed to the active roster. He appeared in the final two games of the 2015 season and in 13 games in 2016.

On November 14, 2017, Worthy was released by the Bills.

=== Tampa Bay Buccaneers ===
On August 20, 2018, Worthy was signed by the Tampa Bay Buccaneers. He was released by the Buccaneers on October 1, 2018.

=== Orlando Apollos ===
On January 6, 2019, Worthy joined the Orlando Apollos of the Alliance of American Football. However, he was placed on injured reserve before the start of the regular season, and activated on March 5, 2019. The league ceased operations in April 2019. In 4 games played, Worthy made 9 tackles and a sack.
