= Mike Mickens =

American football player and coach (born 1987)

Baltimore Ravens
- Title: Defensive pass game coordinator & secondary coach

Personal information
- Born: July 24, 1987 (age 39); Dayton, Ohio, U.S.
- Listed height: 6 ft 1 in (1.85 m)
- Listed weight: 186 lb (84 kg)

Career information
- Position: Cornerback
- High school: Wayne (Huber Heights, Ohio)
- College: Cincinnati (2005–2008)
- NFL draft: 2009: 7th round, 227th overall pick

Career history

Playing
- Dallas Cowboys (2009)*; Tampa Bay Buccaneers (2009); Cincinnati Bengals (2009)*; Calgary Stampeders (2010)*
- * Offseason or practice squad member only

Coaching
- Cincinnati (2011) Defensive assistant; Indiana State (2012) Defensive assistant; Idaho (2013) Cornerbacks coach; Bowling Green (2014–2017) Cornerbacks coach; Cincinnati (2018–2019) Cornerbacks coach; Notre Dame (2020–2025); Cornerbacks coach (2020–2023); Defensive backs coach (2024–2025); Baltimore Ravens (2026–present) Defensive pass game coordinator & secondary coach

Awards and highlights
- Playing: All-American (2007); All-Big East (2007); 2× Second-team All-Big East (2006, 2008)
- Stats at Pro Football Reference

Michael Mickens (born July 24, 1987) is an American football coach and former cornerback who is the defensive pass game coordinator and secondary coach for the Baltimore Ravens of the National Football League (NFL). He was a member of the Dallas Cowboys, Tampa Bay Buccaneers, and Cincinnati Bengals of the NFL, and the Calgary Stampeders of the Canadian Football League (CFL). He played college football for the Cincinnati Bearcats.

== Early life ==
Mickens attended Wayne High School, where he helped his team to two league titles and a 24–9 record. He posted in his career 205 tackles, 10 interceptions, 4 blocked field goals and one kickoff returned for a touchdown. He received All-Greater Western Ohio Conference honors twice.

He also practiced track and field, winning the 300 metres hurdles state title as a junior and placing second on the 4 × 400 metres relay team at the state finals as a sophomore.

== College career ==
Mickens accepted a football scholarship from the University of Cincinnati. As a freshman, he earned the starter right cornerback position during the preseason practices and went on to become an impact player, registering 51 tackles (sixth on the team), 15 passes defensed (second in the nation) and one interception.

As a sophomore, he was moved to left cornerback, collecting 59 tackles (sixth on the team), 15 passes deflected (eighth in the nation), 3 interceptions, one quarterback pressure, one forced fumble and one fumble recovery.

He received All-American honors as a junior, after recording 53 tackles, 6 interceptions (second in school history) and 12 passes defensed. He combined with fellow cornerback DeAngelo Smith to register a total of 14 interceptions, the most by a cornerback duo in college football in 2007. He had 6 tackles and 2 interceptions, including one returned for a 45-yard touchdown against Southeast Missouri State University. He had 7 tackles, one interception and one fumble recovery against Marshall University.

Mickens elected to return to school for his senior season, but suffered a left knee injury during a practice on November 20, 2008. He started 11 games at left cornerback, but missed the last 3 regular season games. He returned to play in the 2009 Orange Bowl, although he struggled in the contest. He finished the year with 70 tackles (second on the team), 2 tackles for loss, 10 passes defensed and 4 interceptions (tied for the team lead). He had 14 tackles and 3 passes defensed against the University of Akron. He had 11 tackles and on pass defensed against West Virginia University.

He left as the school's career leader in interceptions (14) and interception return yards (296). He started 46 out of 47 games, while registering 233 tackles (8 for loss), 48 passes defensed, one sack, one forced fumble and 2 fumble recoveries.

Mickens was inducted into the University of Cincinnati's Jame P. Kelly Hall of Fame on October 24, 2025.

== Professional career ==
Pre-draft measurables
| Height | Weight | Arm length | Hand span | 40-yard dash | 10-yard split | 20-yard split | 20-yard shuttle | Three-cone drill | Vertical jump | Broad jump |
|---|---|---|---|---|---|---|---|---|---|---|
| 5 ft 11 1/2 in (1.82 m) | 184 lb (83 kg) | 31 3/4 in (0.81 m) | 9 5/8 in (0.24 m) | 4.53 s | 1.53 s | 2.62 s | 4.17 s | 6.94 s | 35.5 in (0.90 m) | 9 ft 11 in (3.02 m) |
All values from NFL Combine/Pro Day

=== Dallas Cowboys ===
Mickens was considered a possible first round talent, but ended up being selected in the seventh round (227th overall) of the 2009 NFL draft by the Dallas Cowboys. He dropped because of concerns about the left knee injury he suffered in college, that caused him to run 4.53 at his Pro Day.

He was waived on September 5, after showing a lack of speed and quickness. He was signed to the practice squad with hopes that he could return to his old form.

=== Tampa Bay Buccaneers ===
The Tampa Bay Buccaneers signed him from the Dallas Cowboys practice squad on November 2, 2009. He was declared inactive in three games, before being released on November 24.

=== Cincinnati Bengals ===
The Cincinnati Bengals signed him to their practice squad on November 30, 2009. He was released on April 15, 2010.

=== Calgary Stampeders ===
On May 27, 2010, Mickens signed with the Calgary Stampeders of the Canadian Football League. He was released on June 9 and decided to retire because of injury.

== Coaching career ==
In 2011, he was a defensive assistant at the University of Cincinnati. In 2012, he was a defensive assistant at Indiana State University. In 2013, he became the cornerbacks coach at the University of Idaho. In 2014, he moved on to Bowling Green State University to be the cornerbacks coach. In 2014, he was named the cornerbacks coach at Bowling Green.

In December 2017, it was announced that he was joining Kent State as the team's secondary coach. In January 2018, he was named the Cincinnati cornerbacks coach. In February 2020, he was hired as the cornerbacks' coach at the University of Notre Dame, reuniting with Brian Kelly, who was his head coach at the University of Cincinnati.

On January 29, 2026, Mickens joined the Baltimore Ravens as defensive pass game coordinator and secondary coach.
