= Huber Heights City School District =

School district in Ohio, U.S.

Coordinates: 39°51′3″N 84°7′39″W

Huber Heights City Schools is a school district serving Huber Heights, Ohio. Starting in 1810 when Wayne Township was created, until 1981, when the majority of the township was incorporated as the City of Huber Heights, the district was known as Wayne Township Local School District. The initial district was composed of two log schoolhouses that sat on the farms of John Shafer and Abraham Kendig.

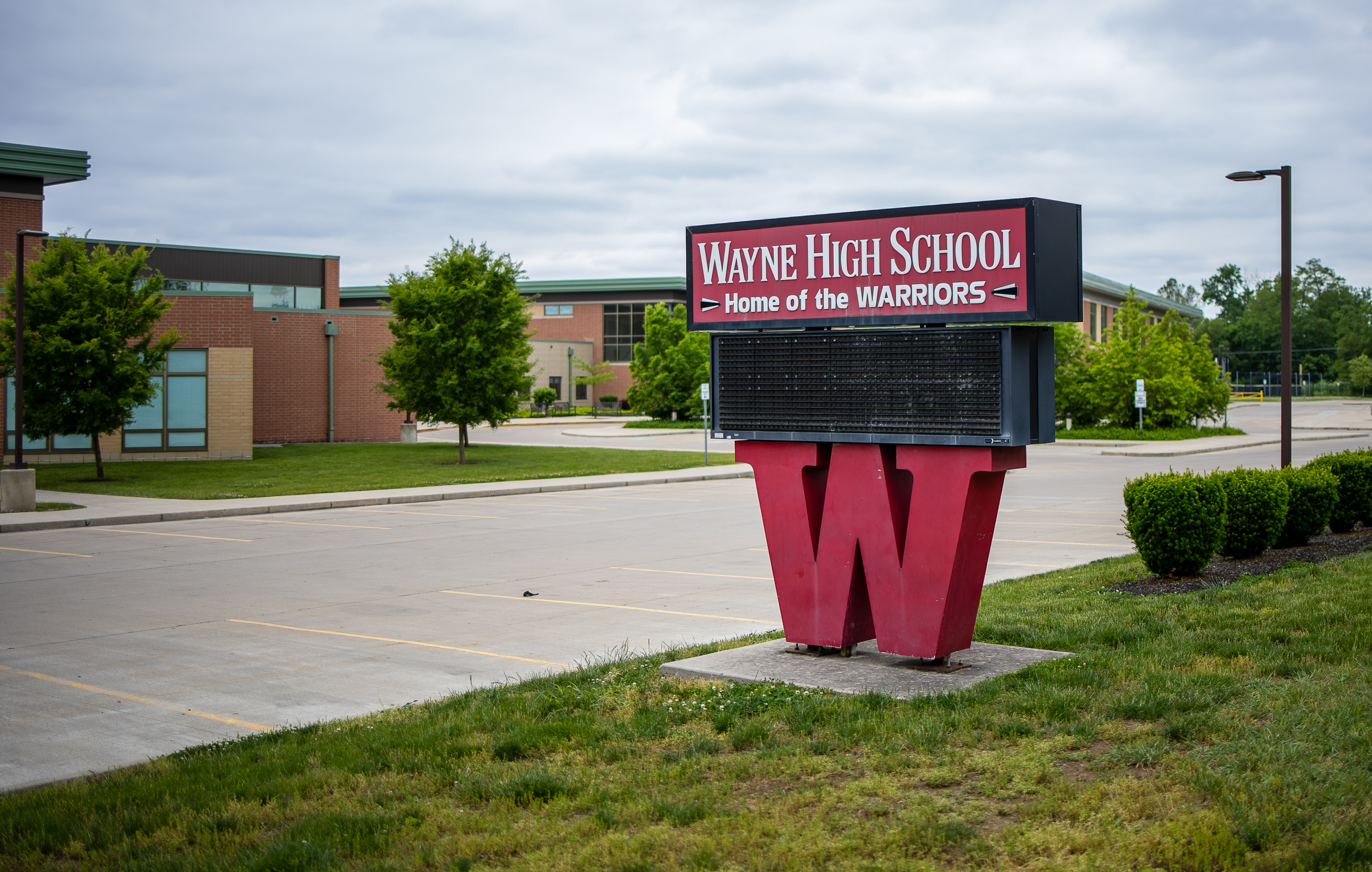
Wayne High School, 2021

== Schools ==
=== High schools ===
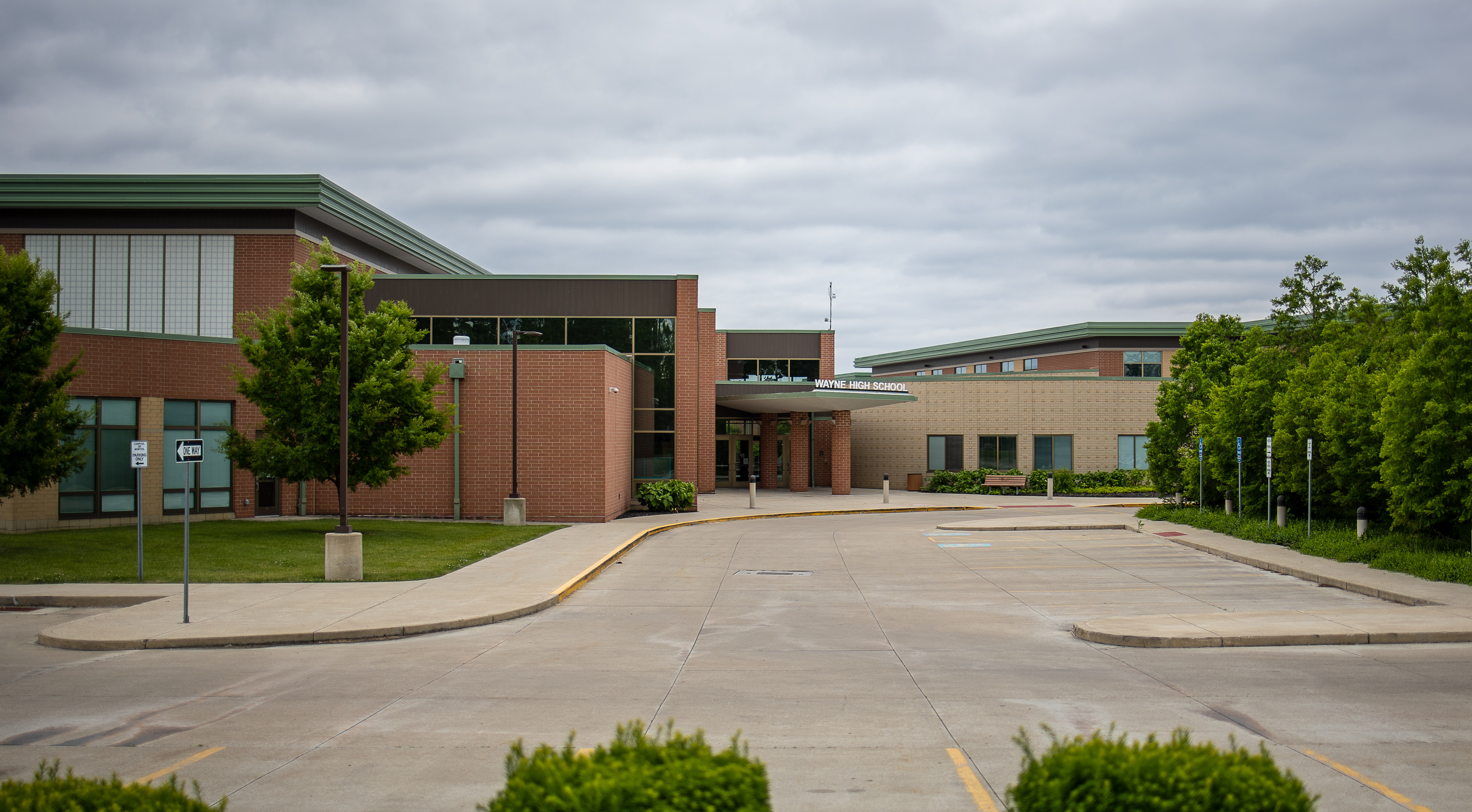
Wayne High School, 2021

- Wayne High School
  - The first wing of the school was built in 1959 and is named Douglas Hall, for Mason Douglass. The second wing was built 1961 and is named Filbrun Hall, after Edward C. Filbrun. The third wing was built 1963 and is named Hawke Hall, after Walter Edwin Hawke. The fourth wing was built 1963 and is named Storck Hall, after Walter Ray Storck and his son, Earl W. Storck. The fifth wing was built 1966 and is named Shank Hall, after Norvell Alonzo Shank.

=== Middle schools ===
- Weisenborn Middle School
  - In the fall of 2012, all 7th and 8th graders in the district started attending this school. Formerly Clara E. Weisenborn Junior High School, the original Weisenborn building was constructed on an open classroom plan, with groups of two-to-four classrooms. There were no walls within these groups, but over time, teachers used cabinets, coat racks, portable chalkboards, and other furniture to isolate individual rooms. Eventually, walls and doors were built between classrooms, but because of the layout, many of the classrooms could be accessed only by walking through another classroom. The school was named for Clara E. Weisenborn, who was a member of the Ohio legislature for twenty-two years.

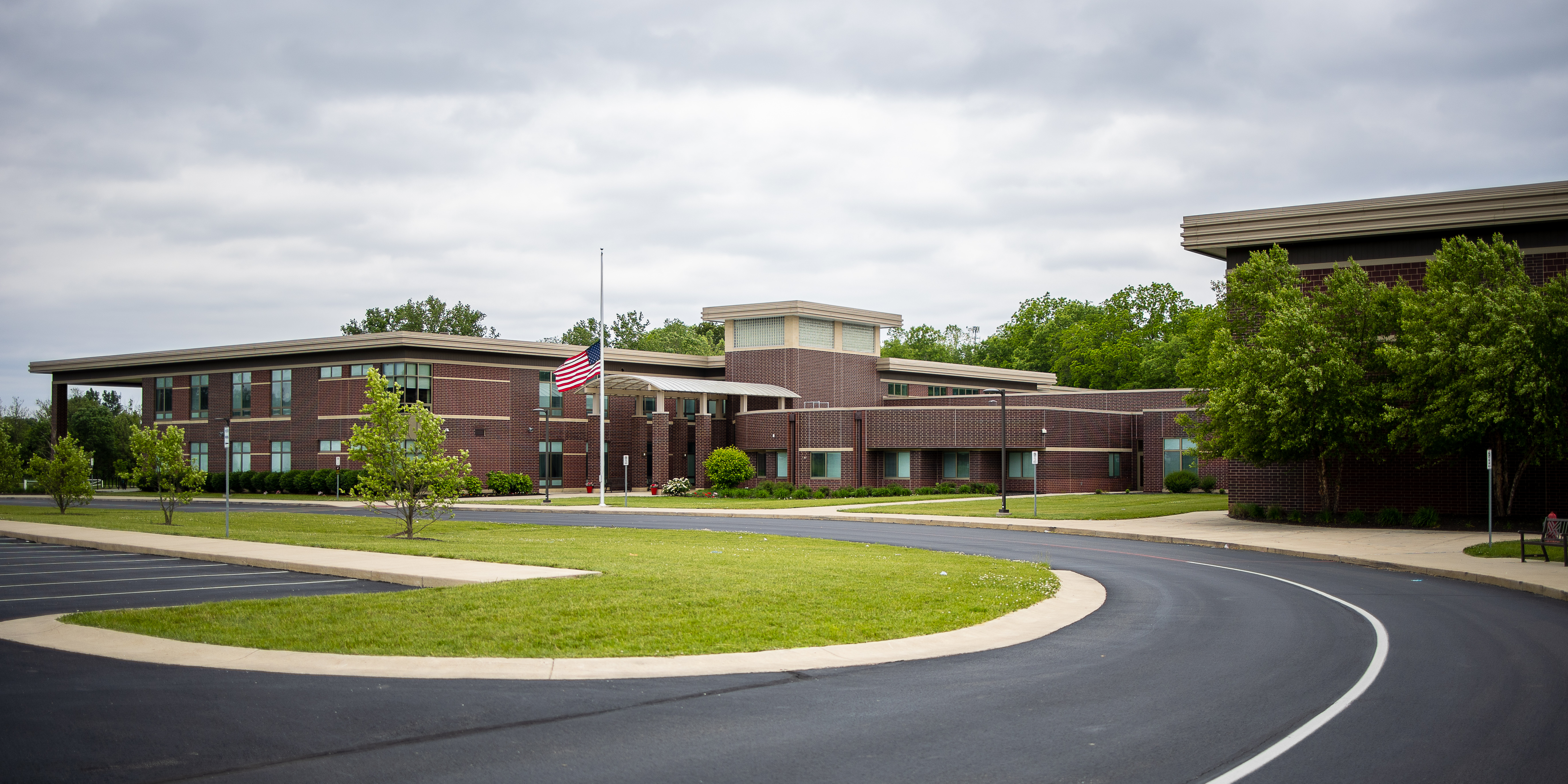
Weisenborn Middle School, 2021

- Studebaker Middle School
  - Currently being used to house administrative staff, SOAR program, Preschool and YMCA latchkey program. Formerly Robert H. Studebaker Junior High School. The school was constructed in 1970 and is named after Robert H. Studebaker. He was a member of the school board for twenty years and a trustee of the Ohio School Board Association.

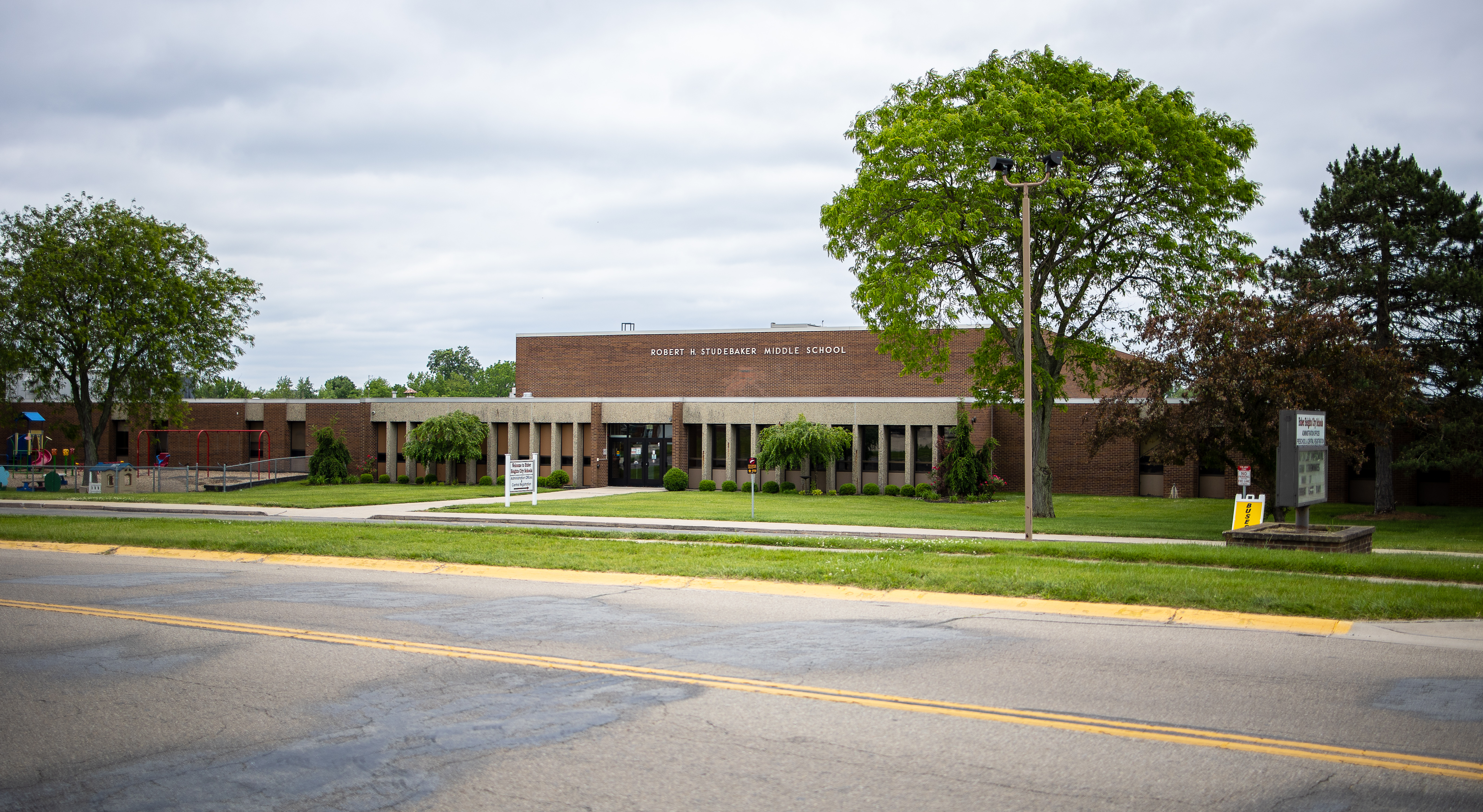
Studebaker Middle School, 2021

=== Elementary schools ===
- Rushmore Elementary
  - First opened in 1964. The school is named after Mount Rushmore

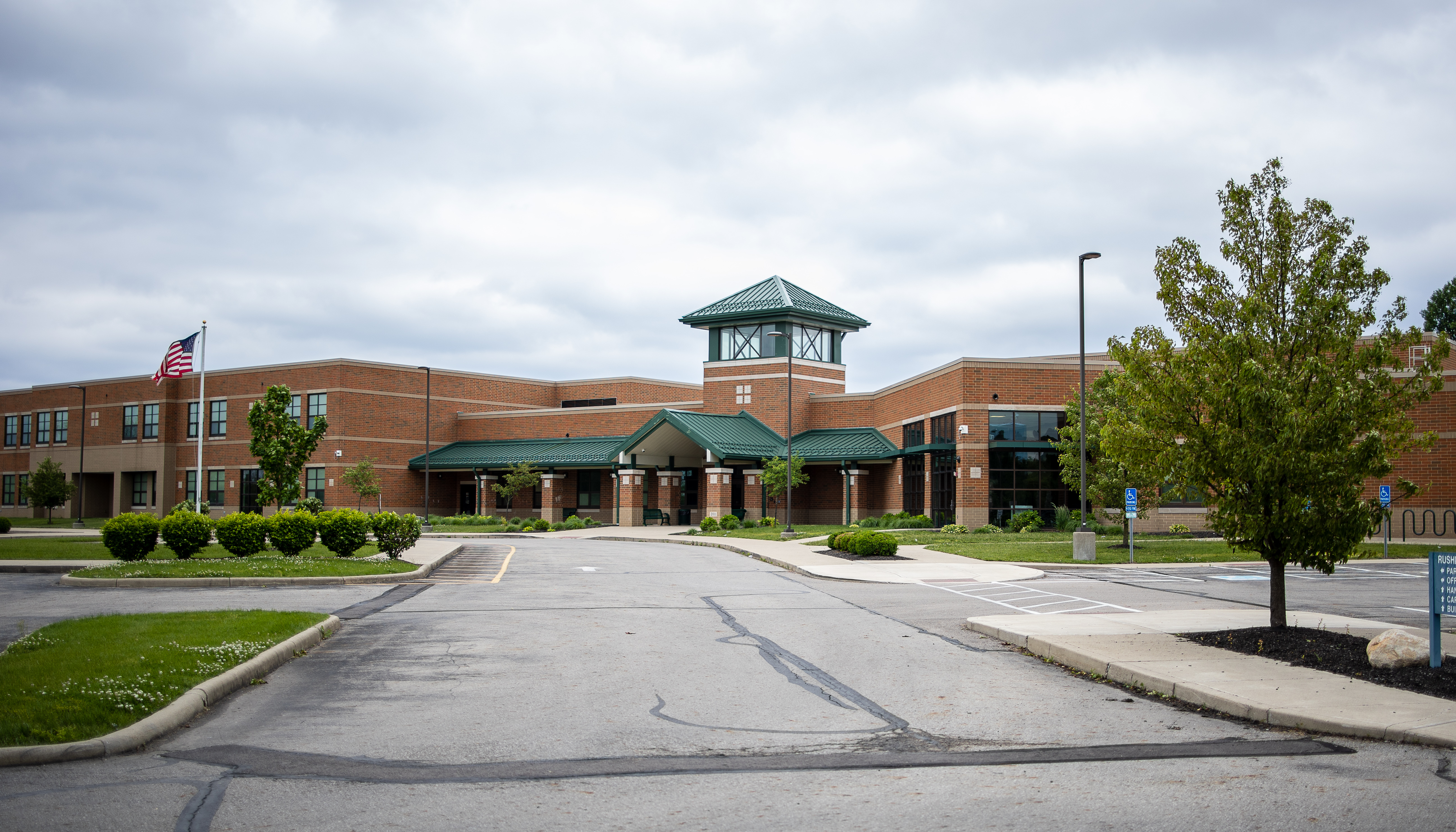
Rushmore Elementary School, 2021

- Monticello Elementary
  - First opened 1965. The school is named after Monticello

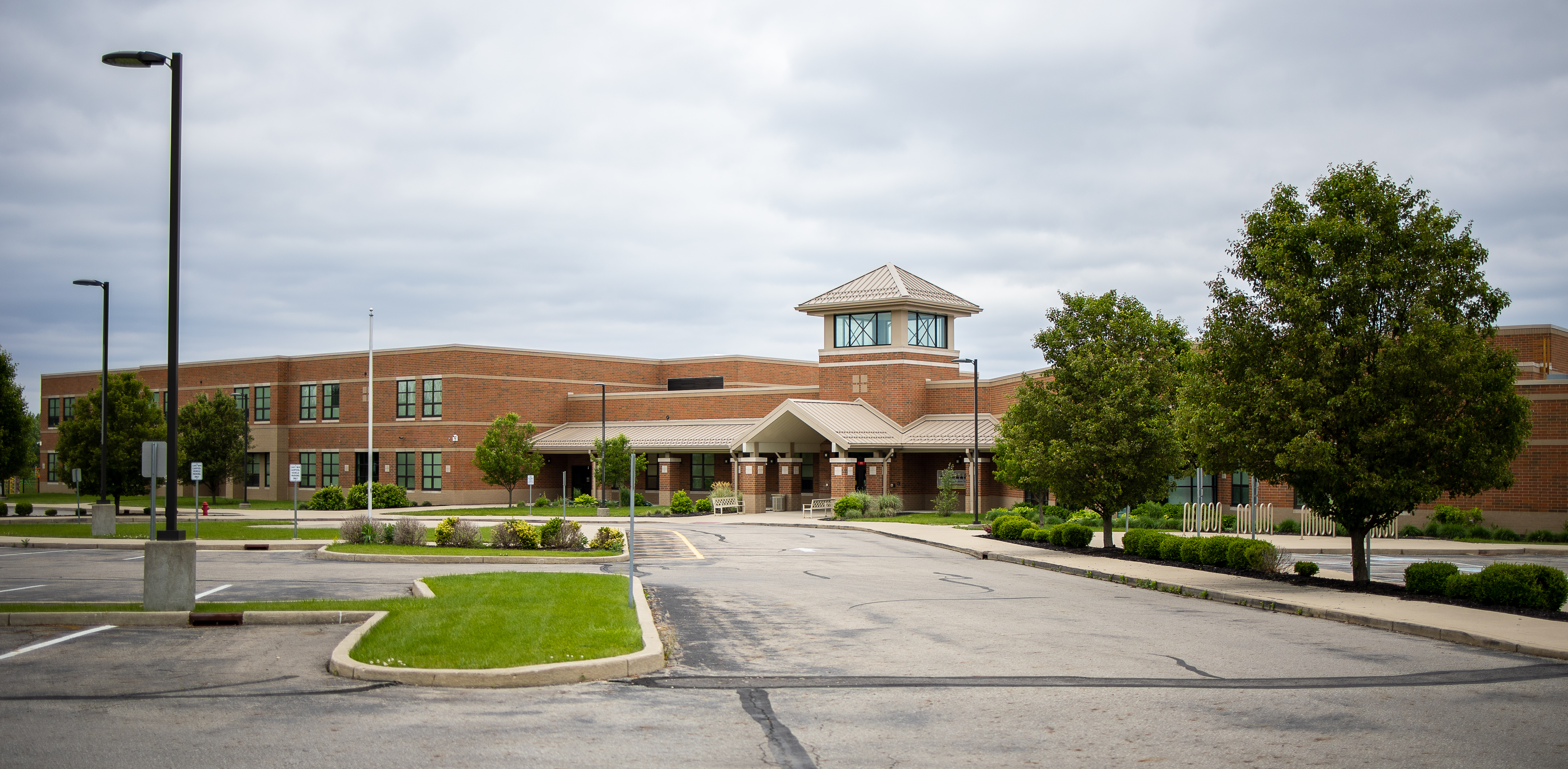
Monticello Elementary School, 2021

- Valley Forge Elementary
  - First opened in 1970. The school is named after Valley Forge

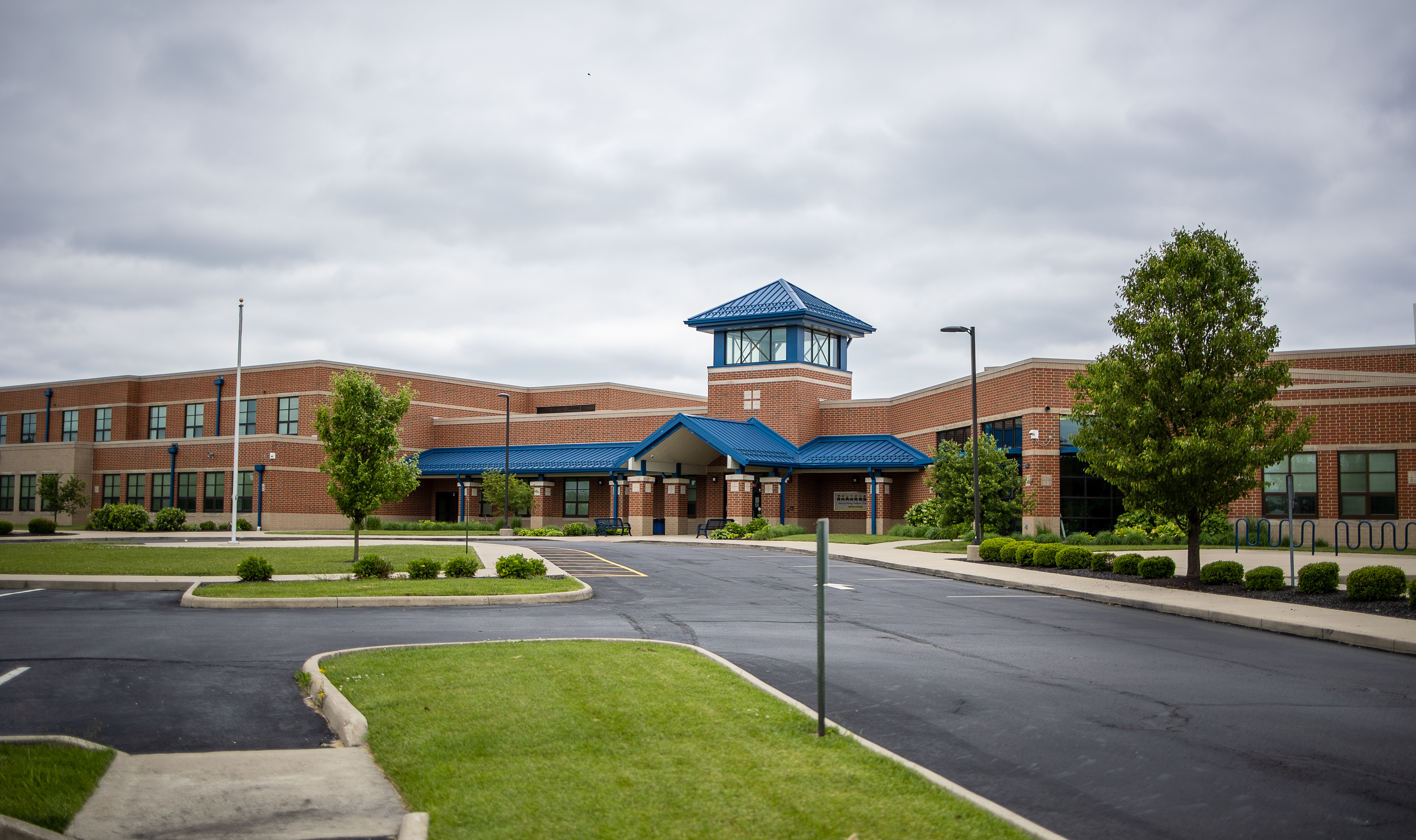
Valley Forge Elementary School, 2021

- Charles H. Huber Elementary
  - Named after Charles H. Huber, the developer who constructed a number of the houses for Huber Heights.

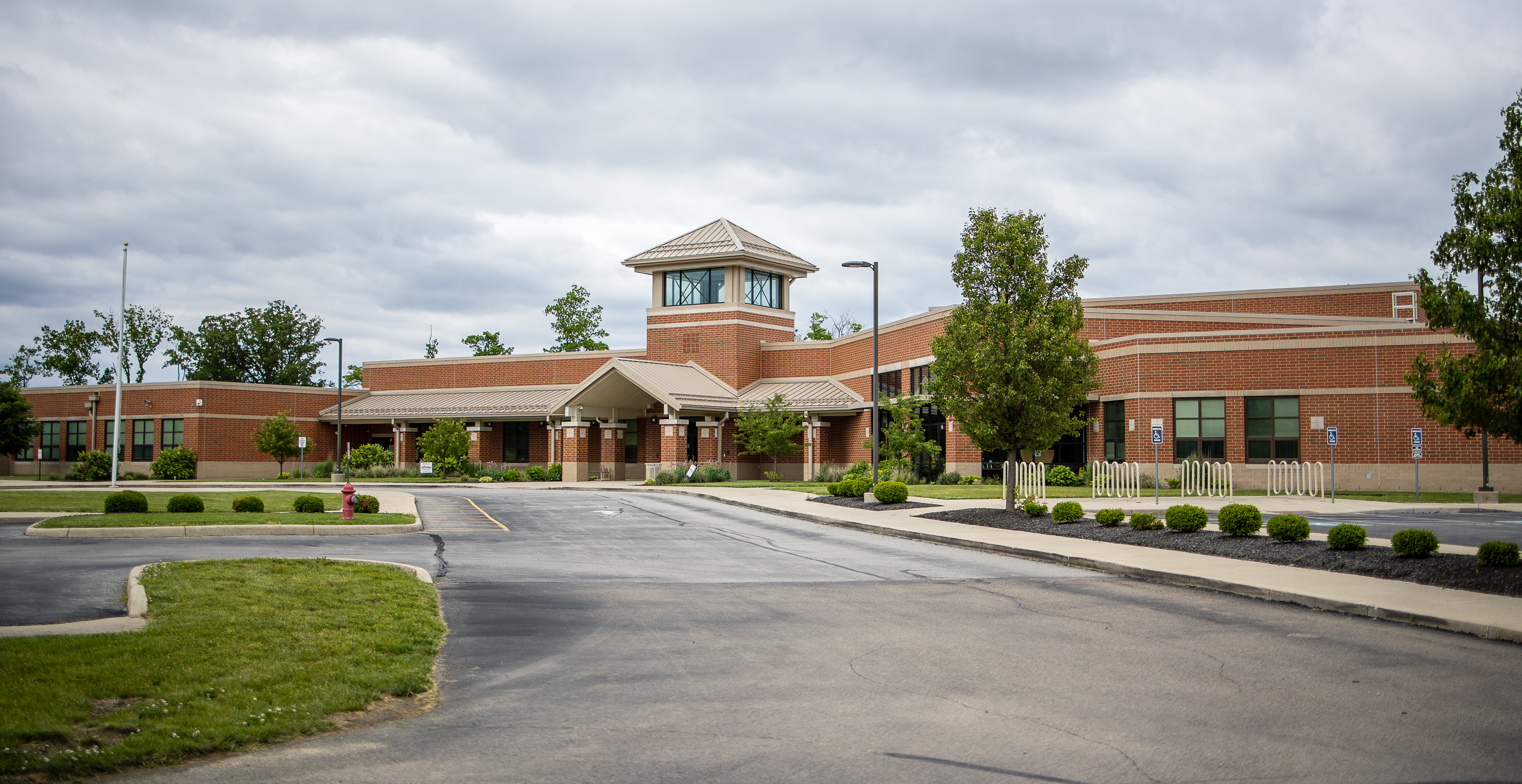
Charles H. Huber Elementary, 2021

- Wright Brothers Elementary
  - Constructed in 2012 after demolition of Kitty Hawk and Menlo Park Elementary Schools.

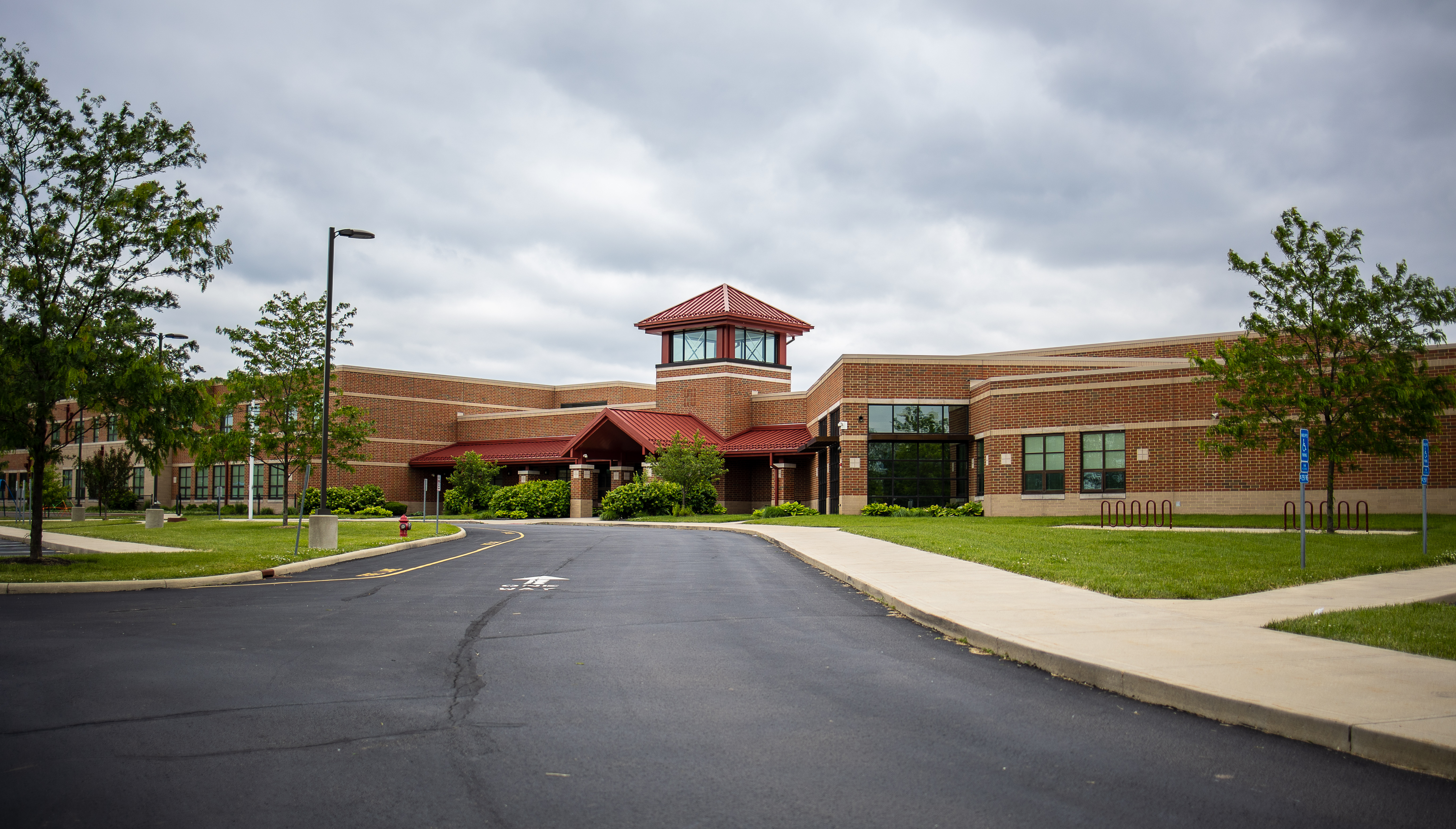
Wright Brothers Elementary, 2021

==== Former Elementary Schools ====
- Titus Elementary (formerly Titus Junior High School)
  - Constructed in 1916 as Wayne Township Centralized School, Titus Elementary originally housed all 12 grades. It was renovated in 1972 and turned into a junior high school. The school is named after Mabel Titus, who taught at the school district for over thirty-eight years.
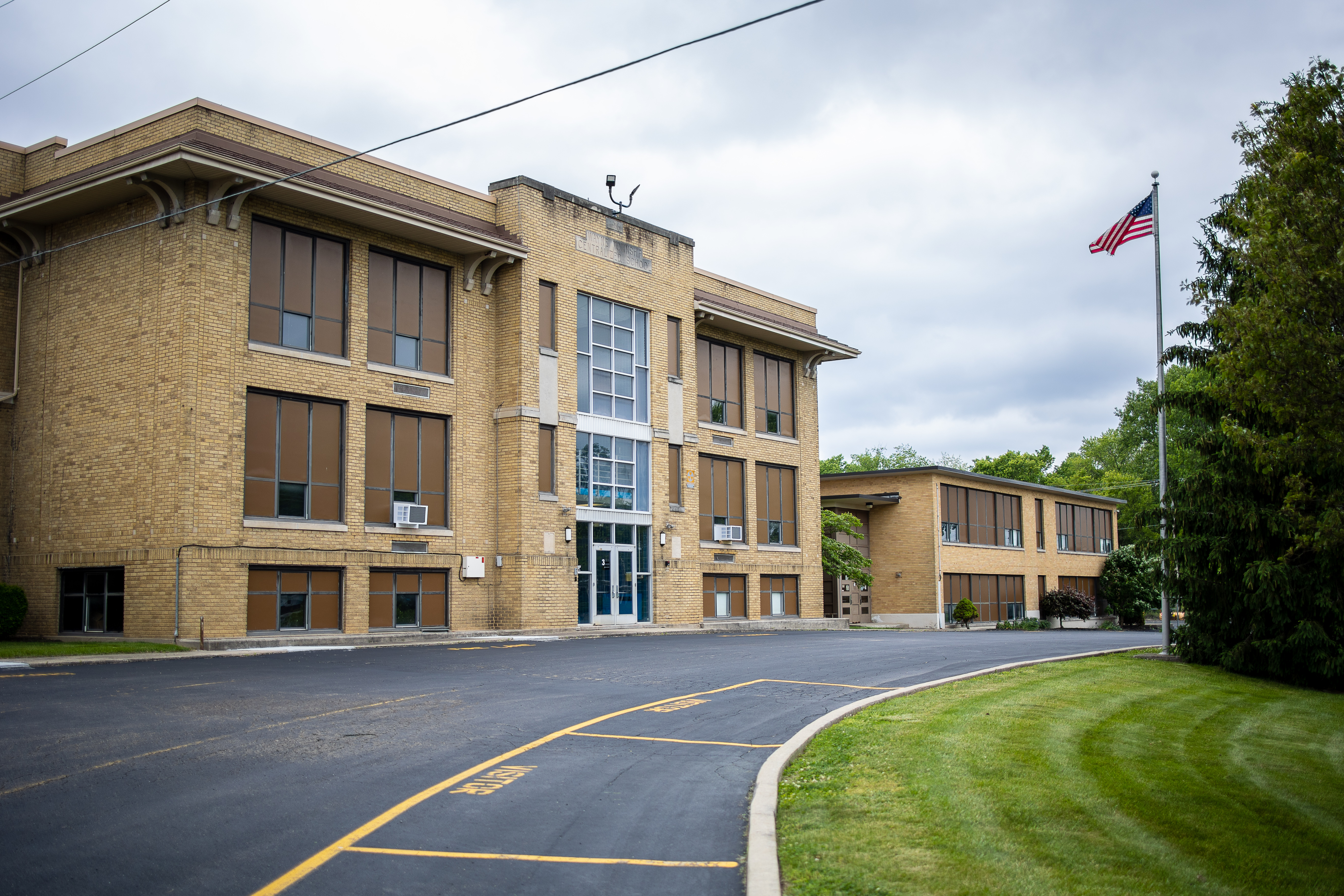
Titus Elementary School, 2021
- Kitty Hawk Elementary
  - The school first opened in 1959 and was the first strictly elementary school in Wayne Township. It would later close in 1982 and reopen in 1989 as Kitty Hawk School, offering kindergarten, classes for gifted and disabled students, and community programs.
- Menlo Park Elementary
  - First opened in 1962. Kitty Hawk and Menlo Park were twin schools located on the same property, separated by a parking area. Depending on enrollment requirements, the two schools were often divided by grade, for example, kindergarten through third grade at one school and fourth to sixth grade at the other. They were eventually demolished and replaced by Wright Brothers Elementary.
- Robert J. LaMendola Elementary
  - First opened in 1971 as Shenandoah Elementary. The school was renamed in 1989 to LaMendola Elementary following the death of the then principal Robert LaMendola. Shenandoah, like Weisenborn, was built on an open classroom plan. classrooms were organized into groups of four called "pods" that shared a common space for large group programs and for storage of students' coats, lunch boxes, and the like. There were no walls between the classrooms in a pod, but heavy curtains could be drawn when necessary. The school was closed in 2011.

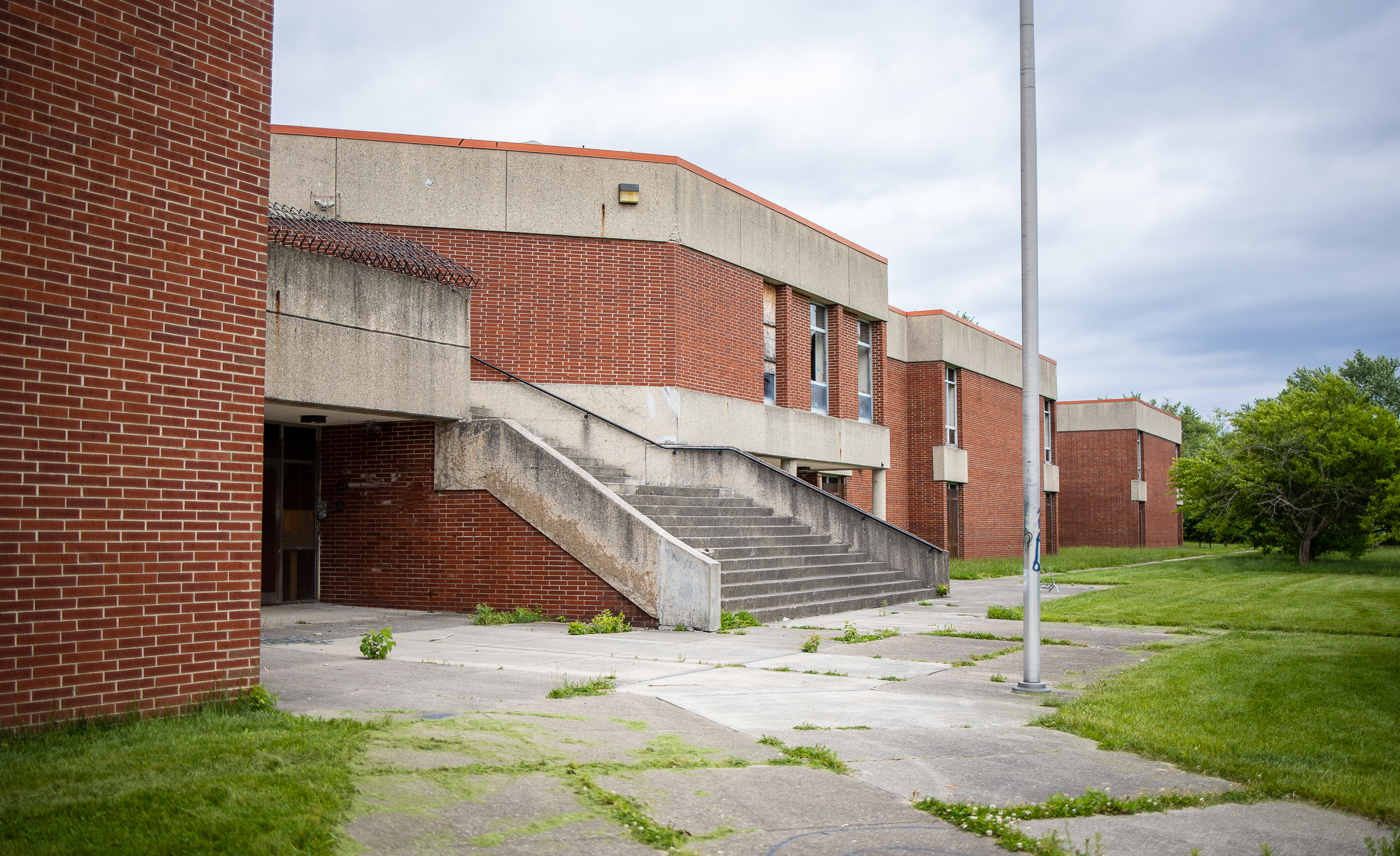
LaMendola Elementary, 2021

=== Current and Former Athletics Nicknames ===
- Wayne Warriors
- Weisenborn Cougars
- Studebaker Warriors
- Kitty Hawk Flyers
- Menlo Park Panthers
- Monticello Warriors (formerly Mustangs)
- Rushmore Spartans
- Titus Eagles
- Valley Forge Patriots
- Shenandoah/LaMendola Braves
