= Trey Landers =

American basketball player (born 1998)

Trey Landers Jr
Free agent
- Position: Small forward

Personal information
- Born: June 20, 1998 (age 28) Dayton, Ohio
- Listed height: 6 ft 5 in (1.96 m)
- Listed weight: 220 lb (100 kg)

Career information
- High school: Wayne (Huber Heights, Ohio)
- College: Dayton (2016–2020)
- NBA draft: 2020: undrafted
- Playing career: 2020–present

Career history
- 2020: ratiopharm Ulm
- 2021: Kataja BC
- 2022: Cleveland Charge

Career highlights
- Third-team All-Atlantic 10 (2020)

Trey Landers (born June 20, 1998) is an American professional basketball player who last played for the Cleveland Charge of the NBA G League. He played college basketball for the Dayton Flyers.

== High school career ==
Landers played basketball for Wayne High School in Huber Heights, Ohio. As a junior, he helped his team win the Ohio Division I state championship. In his senior season, Landers averaged 16.4 points, 7.3 rebounds and 3.5 assists per game, earning First Team Division I All-Ohio honors from the Associated Press. On March 2, 2015, during his junior year, he committed to playing college basketball for Dayton, a team which had been recruiting him since he was a sophomore.

== College career ==
Landers averaged three points in 5.8 minutes per game through nine appearances as a freshman, playing fewer minutes than any scholarship player on the team. He suffered from hernia pain throughout the season and underwent surgery to repair the injury. In the offseason, he improved his conditioning, losing 10 lbs (4.5 kg). On February 17, 2018, he scored a career-high 26 points in an 80–70 win over Fordham. As a sophomore, Landers averaged 11.3 points and 5.6 rebounds per game and registered four double-doubles. In early February of his junior season, he was replaced in the starting lineup by Obi Toppin. Landers averaged 8.2 points and 6.7 rebounds per game as a junior, while suffering from shoulder pain. On January 5, 2020, he scored a senior season-high 18 points in an 80–67 win against Saint Joseph's. Landers tied his season-high of 18 points on February 1, in a 70–56 win against Fordham. As a senior, he helped Dayton achieve its most successful season in program history, with head coach Anthony Grant calling him the "glue" of the team due to his leadership and attitude. Landers started in all but one game, averaging 10.5 points, 6.9 rebounds and 2.4 assists per game and recording four double-doubles. He was named to the Third Team All-Atlantic 10.

== Professional career ==
=== Ulm (2020) ===
On August 3, 2020, Landers signed his first professional contract, a two-year deal with ratiopharm Ulm of the German Basketball Bundesliga.

=== Kataja BC (2021) ===
On July 7, 2021, he signed with Kataja BC of the Korisliiga. Landers averaged 5.8 points per game.

=== Cleveland Charge (2022) ===
On January 4, 2022, he signed with the Cleveland Charge of the NBA G League.

== Career statistics ==
Legend
GP	Games played	GS	Games started	MPG	Minutes per game
FG%	Field goal percentage	3P%	3-point field goal percentage	FT%	Free throw percentage
RPG	Rebounds per game	APG	Assists per game	SPG	Steals per game
BPG	Blocks per game	PPG	Points per game	**Bold**	Career high

=== College ===
Year	Team	GP	GS	MPG	FG%	3P%	FT%	RPG	APG	SPG	BPG	PPG
2016–17	Dayton	9	0	5.8	**.647**	.333	.400	1.4	.3	.3	.2	3.0
2017–18	Dayton	29	29	**28.9**	.583	**.352**	**.725**	5.6	1.8	**1.1**	**.4**	**11.3**
2018–19	Dayton	**32**	21	27.4	.474	.200	.694	6.7	2.0	.6	.3	8.2
2019–20	Dayton	31	**30**	28.8	.565	.313	.604	**6.9**	**2.4**	1.0	**.4**	10.5
Career		101	80	26.3	.544	.295	.660	6.0	1.9	.9	.3	9.4

== Personal life ==
His father, Robert Sr., was shot and killed in front of a repair shop on December 19, 2006, a case that remains unsolved. Landers' older brother, Robert Jr., played college football for Ohio State as a defensive tackle. His mother, Tracy Mathews, who teaches medical classes at the Dayton JobCorps, was a strong supporter of Trey attending the University of Dayton.
