= Xeyrius Williams =

American basketball player (born 1997)

No. 20 – FC Porto
- Position: Power forward
- League: Liga Betclic

Personal information
- Born: May 26, 1997 (age 29)
- Listed height: 6 ft 9 in (2.06 m)
- Listed weight: 215 lb (98 kg)

Career information
- High school: Wayne (Huber Heights, Ohio)
- College: Dayton (2015–2018); Akron (2019–2020)
- NBA draft: 2020: undrafted
- Playing career: 2020–present

Career history
- 2020: Körmend
- 2020–2021: Jászberényi KSE
- 2021–2022: Aris Thessaloniki
- 2022–2023: s.Oliver Würzburg
- 2023–2024: Rasta Vechta
- 2024: MKS Dąbrowa Górnicza
- 2024–2025: FC Porto
- 2025–2026: Tycoon
- 2026–present: FC Porto

Career highlights
- 2× Portuguese Supercup winner (2024, 2026); Portuguese Cup winner (2025); Third-team All-MAC (2020)

Xeyrius Clifton Williams (born May 26, 1997) is an American professional basketball player for FC Porto of the Liga Portuguesa de Basquetebol (LFP), after short profession stints in Hungary, Greece, Germany and Poland. He played college basketball for University of Dayton and University if Akron, both in Ohio, United States.

== Early life and high school career ==
Williams attended Wayne High School. As a junior, he averaged 11.9 points and 9.8 rebounds per game, while shooting 50.9 percent from the field. Williams averaged 11.8 points and 9.9 rebounds per game as a senior and led Wayne to a Division I state title. He was named co-MVP for the second straight season. Williams committed to Dayton in June 2014.

== College career ==
As a freshman at Dayton, Williams averaged 2.1 points and 1.7 rebounds per game. Williams averaged 8.2 points and 4.8 rebounds per game as a sophomore. In the first four games of his junior season, he started and averaged 11.3 points per game. He missed the next five games with a back injury, and posted 16 points against Saint Mary's in his second game back but never regained his starting role. Williams stopped travelling to away games in February 2018 to focus on academics, and he was ruled out indefinitely with a back injury on February 28. He finished the season averaging 5.0 points and 3.1 rebounds per game. Following the season, he informed coach Anthony Grant of his intention to transfer. Williams announced he was transferring to Akron on April 24, having also visited Kent State.

Williams posted a career-high 25 points on December 4, 2019, in an 85–73 win over Marshall. On February 8, 2020, Williams hit the game-winning three-pointer with 4.2 seconds remaining in a 59–58 win over Eastern Michigan. As a senior, Williams averaged 13.9 points and 9.5 rebounds per game, shooting 90.8 percent from the free-throw line, 48.0 percent from 2-point range and 29.9 percent from 3-point range. He led Akron to a 24–7 record and the top seed in the conference tournament, which was cancelled due to the coronavirus pandemic. Williams was named to the Third Team All-MAC.

== Professional career ==
On July 25, 2020, Williams signed his first professional deal with BC Körmend of the NB I/A. He averaged 8.9 points, 5.2 rebounds, and 1.0 steal per game.

On July 24, 2021, Williams signed with Aris of the Greek Basket League. In 24 games, he averaged 10.1 points, 4.8 rebounds, 0.8 assists, 0.6 blocks and 0.8 steals, playing around 30 minutes per contest.

On July 29, 2022, he signed with s.Oliver Würzburg of the Basketball Bundesliga.

For the 2023–24 season, Williams signed with SC Rasta Vechta.

On January 9, 2024, he signed with MKS Dąbrowa Górnicza of the PLK.

On July 31, 2026, he signed with FC Porto of the Liga Portuguesa de Basquetebol (LFP), for a second stint.

== Personal life ==
Williams is the son of Clifton and Kay Williams. His father played football at Central State University while his mother was an athlete at Catholic Central School in Springfield, Ohio before attending the University of Cincinnati. Williams has an older sister, Shatila, and a younger sister, Alisa, both of whom are volleyball players. He was named after Xeryus cologne.
