= Larry Turner (American football) =

American football player (born 1982)

No. 64, 63
- Position: Offensive guard

Personal information
- Born: March 8, 1982 (age 44); Dayton, Ohio, U.S.
- Listed height: 6 ft 2 in (1.88 m)
- Listed weight: 290 lb (132 kg)

Career information
- High school: Huber Heights (OH) Wayne
- College: Eastern Kentucky
- NFL draft: 2004: 7th round, 238th overall pick

Career history
- St. Louis Rams (2004); Cincinnati Bengals (2005); St. Louis Rams (2005–2006)
- Stats at Pro Football Reference

Larry Edgar Turner Jr (born March 8, 1982) is an American former professional football center for the St. Louis Rams and Cincinnati Bengals of the National Football League (NFL). He attended Eastern Kentucky University, before being selected by the Rams.

== Early life ==
Turner attended Wayne High School (Huber Heights, Ohio) and won three varsity letters in football, and one in wrestling. In football, as a senior, he won All-League honors, All-Area honors, and was an All-Southwest District honoree. Turner graduated from Wayne High School in 2000.

== Professional career ==
At his pro day at Eastern Kentucky, Turner ran a 5.23 40-yard dash and measured 6-1¼ and 295 pounds.

Turner was selected by the St. Louis Rams in the seventh round (238th overall) of the 2004 NFL draft. He played for the Rams for three seasons, playing in 14 games as a rookie, making one start.

== Coaching career ==
After he was released by the Rams, he coached offensive line for the Springboro (Ohio) High School Panthers from 2007 to 2009. For the 2011 season he was a graduate assistant football coach at Eastern Kentucky University.
