= Teresa Pace =

American electrical engineer

Teresa Pace is an electrical engineer at L3Harris. She received her doctorate in EE at The Pennsylvania State University. She specializes in digital image and signal processing for the development of detection, recognition, classification, tracking, and image enhancement algorithms primarily for EO/IR US defense applications. She has worked at PSU ARL, Lockheed Martin Missiles and Fire Control as well as LM Global Training Solutions, DRS a Finnmechanica Company, The US Army’s Night Vision Labs as a subject matter expert and SenTech, LLC, in Orlando, Florida. She was named a Fellow of the Institute of Electrical and Electronics Engineers (IEEE) in 2015 for her contributions to image and signal processing algorithms for sensor systems. Dr Pace received the highest technical award from LM, the Nova Award for her individual contributions in real time video tracking. She has 15 patents and over 80 publications. She is a life member of HKN engineering honor society, past president of IEEE Aerospace and Electronic Systems Society, past Editor in Chief for IEEE AESS magazine, and a member of IEEE Women in Engineering, and was chair of the SPIE society’s Defense, Commercial, and Sensing Conference.
