= 2016–17 Duquesne Dukes men's basketball team =

American college basketball season

2016–17 Duquesne Dukes men's basketball
- Conference: Atlantic 10 Conference
- Record: 10–22 (3–15 A-10)
- Head coach: Jim Ferry (5th season)
- Assistant coaches: John Rhodes; Rich Glesmann; Danny Lawson; Brian Baudinet
- Home arena: A. J. Palumbo Center (Capacity: 4,406)

2016–17 Atlantic 10 men's basketball standings
	Conf.				Overall
Team	W		L	PCT	W		L	PCT
Dayton	15	–	3	.833	24	–	8	.750
VCU	14	–	4	.778	26	–	9	.743
Rhode Island †	13	–	5	.722	25	–	10	.714
Richmond	13	–	5	.722	22	–	13	.629
Saint Bonaventure	11	–	7	.611	20	–	12	.625
George Washington	10	–	8	.556	20	–	15	.571
George Mason	9	–	9	.500	20	–	14	.588
La Salle	9	–	9	.500	15	–	15	.500
Davidson	8	–	10	.444	17	–	15	.531
Fordham	7	–	11	.389	13	–	19	.406
Saint Louis	6	–	12	.333	12	–	21	.364
UMass	4	–	14	.222	15	–	18	.455
Saint Joseph's	4	–	14	.222	11	–	20	.355
Duquesne	3	–	15	.167	10	–	22	.313
† 2017 A10 Tournament winner

The 2016–17 Duquesne Dukes men's basketball team represented Duquesne University during the 2016–17 NCAA Division I men's basketball season. The Dukes, led by fifth-year head coach Jim Ferry, played their home games at the A. J. Palumbo Center in Pittsburgh, Pennsylvania as members of the Atlantic 10 Conference. They finished the season 10–22, 3–15 in A-10 play to finish in last place. In the A-10 tournament, they lost in the first round to Saint Louis.

On March 13, 2017, Duquesne fired head coach Jim Ferry after five seasons. The school then hired Akron head coach Keith Dambrot on March 28.

== Previous season ==
The Dukes finished the 2015–16 season with a record of 17–17, 6–12 in A-10 play to finish in a tie for tenth place. They lost to La Salle in the first round of the A-10 tournament. The Dukes were invited to the College Basketball Invitational where they defeated Nebraska–Omaha in the first round before losing in the quarterfinals to Morehead State.

== Offseason ==
=== Departures ===
Name	Number	Pos.	Height	Weight	Year	Hometown	Notes
Derrick Colter	1	G	5'11"	180	Senior	Forestville, MD	Graduated
TySean Powell	5	F	6'6"	215	Sophomore	Twinsburg, OH	Transferred to Pacific
Mar'Qywell Jackson	13	G	6'5"	195	RS Freshman	Detroit, MI	Transferred to Moberly Area CC
Micah Mason	22	G	6'2"	180	Senior	Natrona Heights, PA	Graduated
Jeremiah Jones	23	G	6'3"	200	Senior	Gary, IN	Graduated
Nick Foschia	31	F	6'4"	220	Senior	Northfield Center, OH	Graduated
L. G. Gill	33	F	6'8"	220	Junior	Chesterfield, VA	Graduate transferred to Maryland
Marshall Macheledt	45	F	6'9"	215	Sophomore	Greensboro, NC	Walk-on; left the team for personal reasons

=== Incoming transfers ===
Name	Number	Pos.	Height	Weight	Year	Hometown	Previous School
Emile Blackman	5	G	6'4"	195	RS Senior	Dix Hills, NY	Transferred from Niagara. Will be eligible to play since Blackman graduated from Niagara.
Kale Abrahamson	14	F	6'8"	221	RS Senior	West Des Moines, IA	Transferred from Drake. Will be eligible to play since Abrahamson graduated from Drake.

=== 2016 recruiting class ===
College recruiting information
Name	Hometown	School	Height	Weight	Commit date
Isiaha Mike #92 PF	Scarborough, ON	Trinity International School	6 ft 7 in (2.01 m)	200 lb (91 kg)	Sep 22, 2015
Isiaha Mike #92 PF	Recruit ratings: Scout: Rivals: (64)				
Spencer Littleson; SG	Rochester Hills, MI	Adams High School	6 ft 4 in (1.93 m)	190 lb (86 kg)	Aug 4, 2015
Spencer Littleson; SG	Recruit ratings: Scout: Rivals: (NR)				
Mike Lewis; PG	St. Louis, MO	Chaminade College Prep	6 ft 2 in (1.88 m)	175 lb (79 kg)	Sep 7, 2015
Mike Lewis; PG	Recruit ratings: Scout: Rivals: (NR)				
Overall recruit ranking:
Note: In many cases, Scout, Rivals, 247Sports, On3, and ESPN may conflict in their listings of height and weight.; In these cases, the average was taken. ESPN grades are on a 100-point scale.; Sources: "2016 Team Ranking". Rivals.

== Preseason ==
Duquesne was picked to finish in 13th place in the A-10 preseason poll.

== Roster ==
2016–17 Duquesne Dukes men's basketball team
Players
Coaches

Pos.	#	Name	Height	Weight	Year	Previous school	Hometown
C	00	Darius Lewis	6 ft 11 in (2.11 m)	250 lb (113 kg)	Sr	IMG Academy	Lexington, KY
G	1	Mike Lewis II	6 ft 1 in (1.85 m)	175 lb (79 kg)	Fr	Chaminade	St. Louis, MO
G	2	Eric James	6 ft 6 in (1.98 m)	205 lb (93 kg)	Jr	Westerville	Westerville, OH
G	3	Tarin Smith	6 ft 2 in (1.88 m)	180 lb (82 kg)	RS So	Nebraska; St. Anthony	Ocean Township, NJ
G	4	Rene Castro	6 ft 2 in (1.88 m)	195 lb (88 kg)	RS Jr	Butler; Worcester Academy	Boston, MA
G	5	Emile Blackman	6 ft 3 in (1.91 m)	195 lb (88 kg)	RS Sr	Niagara; Half Hollow Hills West	Dix Hills, NY
F	14	Kale Abrahamson	6 ft 8 in (2.03 m)	215 lb (98 kg)	RS Sr	Drake; Valley HS	West Des Moines, IA
F	20	Nakye Sanders	6 ft 8 in (2.03 m)	225 lb (102 kg)	So	Tottenville	Staten Island, NY
G	21	David Haus	6 ft 2 in (1.88 m)	185 lb (84 kg)	Jr	North Allegheny	Pittsburgh, PA
G	25	Spencer Littleson	6 ft 4 in (1.93 m)	195 lb (88 kg)	Fr	Rochester Adams	Rochester Hills, MI
G	30	Josh Steel (W)	6 ft 4 in (1.93 m)	195 lb (88 kg)	So	Barking Abbey Academy	Harlow, England
F	32	Zach Snyder	6 ft 5 in (1.96 m)	190 lb (86 kg)	So	Seneca Valley	Cranberry Township, PA
F	35	Kellon Taylor (W)	6 ft 5 in (1.96 m)	220 lb (100 kg)	Fr	DeMatha Catholic	Landover, MD
F	45	Isiaha Mike	6 ft 8 in (2.03 m)	200 lb (91 kg)	Fr	Trinity International	Scarborough, ON
G	53	Caleb Davis (W)	6 ft 0 in (1.83 m)	170 lb (77 kg)	Fr	Valley	Pennsylvania, PA
C	55	Jordan Robinson	6 ft 8 in (2.03 m)	245 lb (111 kg)	RS Jr	Quality Education Academy	Toronto, ON

Head coach

- Jim Ferry (Keene State)

Assistant coach(es)

- John Rhodes (Ohio)
- Rich Glesmann (Emerson)
- Danny Lawson (Bentley)
- Brian Baudinet (UMass)

Legend

- (C) Team captain
- (S) Suspended
- (I) Ineligible
- (W) Walk-on
- Injured
- Current redshirt

Roster

== Schedule and results ==
Date time, TV	Rank^{#}	Opponent^{#}	Result	Record	Site (attendance) city, state
Exhibition
11/05/2016*; 2:00 pm		Mansfield	L 74–79		Palumbo Center; Pittsburgh, PA
Non-conference regular season
11/11/2016*; 7:00 pm		Loyola (MD)	W 65–60	1–0	Palumbo Center (1,319); Pittsburgh, PA
11/13/2016*; 6:00 pm, BTN		at Penn State	L 74–82	1–1	Bryce Jordan Center (5,586); University Park, PA
11/16/2016*; 7:00 pm		Saint Francis (PA)	W 89–75	2–1	Palumbo Center (1,025); Pittsburgh, PA
11/18/2016*; 7:00 pm		Canisius; Bluegrass Showcase	L 77–78	2–2	Palumbo Center (786); Pittsburgh, PA
11/20/2016*; 9:00 pm, ESPNU		at No. 2 Kentucky; Bluegrass Showcase	L 59–93	2–3	Rupp Arena (21,327); Lexington, KY
11/23/2016*; 7:00 pm		UT Martin; Bluegrass Showcase	L 63–66	2–4	Palumbo Center (825); Pittsburgh, PA
11/27/2016*; 2:00 pm		Cleveland State; Bluegrass Showcase	W 78–71	3–4	Palumbo Center (887); Pittsburgh, PA
11/30/2016*; 7:00 pm		UMBC	L 72–81	3–5	Palumbo Center (903); Pittsburgh, PA
12/02/2016*; 7:00 pm		vs. Pittsburgh; City Game	W 64–55	4–5	PPG Paints Arena (10,997); Pittsburgh, PA
12/06/2016*; 7:00 pm		at Robert Morris	L 60–64	4–6	PPG Paints Arena (1,819); Pittsburgh, PA
12/10/2016*; 2:00 pm		Central Connecticut	W 70–67	5–6	Palumbo Center (3,239); Pittsburgh, PA
12/19/2016*; 7:00 pm		Jackson State	W 74–62	6–6	Palumbo Center (747); Pittsburgh, PA
12/22/2016*; 2:00 pm		Colgate	W 70–57	7–6	Palumbo Center (1,082); Pittsburgh, PA
Atlantic 10 regular season
12/30/2016; 7:00 pm		at Fordham	W 75–72	8–6 (1–0)	Rose Hill Gymnasium (1,673); Bronx, NY
01/04/2017; 7:00 pm, ASN/WPNT		VCU	L 87–94	8–7 (1–1)	Palumbo Center (1,038); Pittsburgh, PA
01/07/2017; 8:00 pm, ASN/WPNT		at La Salle	L 81–88	8–8 (1–2)	Tom Gola Arena (1,258); Philadelphia, PA
01/11/2017; 7:00 pm		Saint Louis	W 73–66	9–8 (2–2)	Palumbo Center (1,070); Pittsburgh, PA
01/14/2017; 12:00 pm, CBSSN		Dayton	L 57–76	9–9 (2–3)	PPG Paints Arena (3,132); Pittsburgh, PA
01/18/2017; 7:00 pm		at George Washington	L 63–65	9–10 (2–4)	Charles E. Smith Center (2,653); Washington, D.C.
01/21/2017; 2:30 pm, NBCSN		Rhode Island	L 69–90	9–11 (2–5)	Palumbo Center (1,700); Pittsburgh, PA
01/24/2017; 7:00 pm		at Davidson	L 60–74	9–12 (2–6)	John M. Belk Arena (5,315); Davidson, NC
01/28/2017; 6:00 pm		at Richmond	L 90–101	9–13 (2–7)	Robins Center (7,201); Richmond, VA
02/01/2017; 8:00 pm, ASN/WPNT		St. Bonaventure	L 64–71	9–14 (2–8)	Palumbo Center (975); Pittsburgh, PA
02/04/2017; 12:30 pm, NBCSN		at Dayton	L 53–90	9–15 (2–9)	UD Arena (13,455); Dayton, OH
02/11/2017; 8:00 pm		at Saint Louis	L 81–87	9–16 (2–10)	Chaifetz Arena (5,964); St. Louis, MO
02/15/2017; 7:00 pm		Massachusetts	W 96–66	10–16 (3–10)	Palumbo Center (1,185); Pittsburgh, PA
02/19/2017; 12:00 pm, NBCSN		George Washington	L 70–77	10–17 (3–11)	Palumbo Center (1,746); Pittsburgh, PA
02/22/2016; 7:00 pm		Fordham	L 52–70	10–18 (3–12)	Palumbo Center (1,141); Pittsburgh, PA
02/25/2017; 4:00 pm, ASN/WPNT		at St. Bonaventure	L 77–80	10–19 (3–13)	Reilly Center (5,480); Olean, NY
03/01/2017; 7:00 pm		at George Mason	L 62–63	10–20 (3–14)	EagleBank Arena (3,519); Fairfax, VA
03/04/2017; 2:00 pm		Saint Joseph's	L 60–63	10–21 (3–15)	Palumbo Center (1,464); Pittsburgh, PA
Atlantic 10 tournament
03/08/2017; 8:30 pm, ASN/WPNT	(14)	vs. (11) Saint Louis; First round	L 71–72	10–22	PPG Paints Arena (5,517); Pittsburgh, PA
*Non-conference game. ^{#}Rankings from AP Poll. (#) Tournament seedings in parentheses. All times are in Eastern Time.

== See also ==
- 2016–17 Duquesne Dukes women's basketball team
