= 2016–17 Davidson Wildcats men's basketball team =

American college basketball season

2016–17 Davidson Wildcats men's basketball
- Conference: Atlantic 10 Conference
- Record: 17–15 (8–10 A-10)
- Head coach: Bob McKillop (28th season)
- Assistant coaches: Matt McKillop; Ryan Mee; Will Reigel
- Home arena: John M. Belk Arena (5,295)

2016–17 Atlantic 10 men's basketball standings
	Conf.				Overall
Team	W		L	PCT	W		L	PCT
Dayton	15	–	3	.833	24	–	8	.750
VCU	14	–	4	.778	26	–	9	.743
Rhode Island †	13	–	5	.722	25	–	10	.714
Richmond	13	–	5	.722	22	–	13	.629
Saint Bonaventure	11	–	7	.611	20	–	12	.625
George Washington	10	–	8	.556	20	–	15	.571
George Mason	9	–	9	.500	20	–	14	.588
La Salle	9	–	9	.500	15	–	15	.500
Davidson	8	–	10	.444	17	–	15	.531
Fordham	7	–	11	.389	13	–	19	.406
Saint Louis	6	–	12	.333	12	–	21	.364
UMass	4	–	14	.222	15	–	18	.455
Saint Joseph's	4	–	14	.222	11	–	20	.355
Duquesne	3	–	15	.167	10	–	22	.313
† 2017 A10 Tournament winner

The 2016–17 Davidson Wildcats men's basketball team represented Davidson College during the 2016–17 NCAA Division I men's basketball season. The Wildcats, led by 28th-year head coach Bob McKillop, played their home games at the John M. Belk Arena in Davidson, North Carolina as third-year members of the Atlantic 10 Conference. They finished the regular season 17–15, 8–10 in A-10 play to finish in ninth place. They received the No. 9 seed in the A-10 tournament where they defeated La Salle and Dayton to advance to the semifinals where they lost to Rhode Island.

== Previous season ==
The Wildcats finished the 2015–16 season with a record of 20–13, 10–8 record in A-10 play, finishing in sixth place. They lost to eventual tournament champion, Saint Joseph's, in the semifinals of the A-10 tournament. They received an invitation to the National Invitation Tournament where they lost in the first round to Florida State.

== Offseason ==
=== Departures ===
Name	Number	Pos.	Height	Weight	Year	Hometown	Notes
Brian Sullivan	3	G	6'0"	185	Senior	Upper Arlington, OH	Graduated
Jordan Barham	5	G	6'5"	220	Senior	Cleveland, OH	Graduated
Matt Williams	14	G	6'1"	195	Senior	Cary, NC	Walk-on; graduated
Jake Belford	25	F	6'9"	220	RS Junior	Battle Ground, WA	Retired from basketball due to a concussion injury

=== 2016 recruiting class ===
College recruiting information
Name	Hometown	School	Height	Weight	Commit date
Jón Axel Guðmundsson; PG	Hamburg, Germany		6 ft 5 in (1.96 m)	N/A	
Jón Axel Guðmundsson; PG	Recruit ratings: Scout: Rivals: (0)				
Overall recruit ranking:
Note: In many cases, Scout, Rivals, 247Sports, On3, and ESPN may conflict in their listings of height and weight.; In these cases, the average was taken. ESPN grades are on a 100-point scale.; Sources: "2016 Team Ranking". Rivals.

=== 2017 recruiting class ===
College recruiting information (2017)
Name	Hometown	School	Height	Weight	Commit date
Kellan Grady #43 PG	West Roxbury, MA	Northfield-Mt. Hermon School	6 ft 4 in (1.93 m)	160 lb (73 kg)	Apr 12, 2016
Kellan Grady #43 PG	Recruit ratings: Scout: Rivals: (79)				
Overall recruit ranking:
Note: In many cases, Scout, Rivals, 247Sports, On3, and ESPN may conflict in their listings of height and weight.; In these cases, the average was taken. ESPN grades are on a 100-point scale.; Sources: "2017 Team Ranking". Rivals.

== Preseason ==
Davidson was picked to finish in fourth place in the Preseason A-10 poll.

== Roster ==
2016–17 Davidson Wildcats men's basketball team
Players
Coaches

Pos.	#	Name	Height	Weight	Year	Previous school	Hometown
F	0	Dusan Kovacevic	6 ft 10 in (2.08 m)	245 lb (111 kg)	RS Fr	Rabun Gap-Nacoochee School	Novi Sad, Serbia
F	1	Nathan Ekwu	6 ft 7 in (2.01 m)	235 lb (107 kg)	Jr	Cardinal Hayes High School	Enugu, Nigeria
G	2	Jordan Watkins	6 ft 1 in (1.85 m)	165 lb (75 kg)	Jr	Providence Day School	Charlotte, North Carolina
G	3	Jón Axel Guðmundsson	6 ft 4 in (1.93 m)	190 lb (86 kg)	Fr	Fjölbrautaskóli Suðurnesja	Grindavík, Iceland
G	4	Cal Freundlich (W)	6 ft 2 in (1.88 m)	160 lb (73 kg)	Fr	Friends Seminary	New York, New York
G	5	Malcolm Wynter (W)	5 ft 10 in (1.78 m)	150 lb (68 kg)	Fr	Harborfields High School	Greenlawn, New York
G	12	Jack Gibbs	6 ft 0 in (1.83 m)	195 lb (88 kg)	Sr	Westerville North High School	Westerville, Ohio
G	13	Kamau Faines (W)	6 ft 2 in (1.88 m)	200 lb (91 kg)	Jr	Walter Payton College Prep	Chicago, Illinois
G	14	Michael Brown (W)	5 ft 10 in (1.78 m)	165 lb (75 kg)	Fr	Saint Francis Academy	Gainesville, Florida
F	15	Oskar Michelsen	6 ft 9 in (2.06 m)	225 lb (102 kg)	Jr	Makelanrinne Sports High School	Helsinki, Finland
G	20	KiShawn Pritchett	6 ft 6 in (1.98 m)	230 lb (104 kg)	RS Fr	Lake Norman High School	Mooresville, North Carolina
F	22	Will Magarity	6 ft 11 in (2.11 m)	240 lb (109 kg)	RS Jr	Boston College	Stockholm, Sweden
F	23	Peyton Aldridge	6 ft 8 in (2.03 m)	225 lb (102 kg)	Jr	LaBrae High School	Leavittsville, Ohio
G	31	Manu Giamoukis	6 ft 1 in (1.85 m)	200 lb (91 kg)	Sr	Anatolia College	Thessaloniki, Greece
G	32	Rusty Reigel	6 ft 2 in (1.88 m)	205 lb (93 kg)	Jr	Charlotte Latin School	Charlotte, North Carolina
F	34	Connor Perkey	6 ft 8 in (2.03 m)	215 lb (98 kg)	RS Sr	Pace Academy	Atlanta, Georgia
F	40	Andrew McAuliffe	6 ft 8 in (2.03 m)	260 lb (118 kg)	Sr	Glenbrook North High School	Northbrook, Illinois

Head coach

- Bob McKillop (Hofstra)

Assistant coach(es)

- Matt McKillop (Davidson)
- Ryan Mee (Rochester)
- Will Reigel (Davidson)

Legend

- (C) Team captain
- (S) Suspended
- (I) Ineligible
- (W) Walk-on
- Injured
- Current redshirt

Roster

== Schedule and results ==
Date time, TV	Rank^{#}	Opponent^{#}	Result	Record	Site (attendance) city, state
Exhibition
11/04/2016*; 7:00 pm		Belmont Abbey	W 104–58		John M. Belk Arena; Davidson, NC
Non-conference regular season
11/12/2016*; 8:00 pm, SPCSN		Appalachian State	W 86–74	1–0	John M. Belk Arena (4,598); Davidson, NC
11/17/2016*; 11:00 am, ESPNU		vs. Clemson; Tire Pros Invitational quarterfinals	L 78–95	1–1	HP Field House; Orlando, FL
11/18/2016*; 11:30 am, ESPNU		vs. Missouri; Tire Pros Invitational 2nd round consolation	W 70–55	2–1	HP Field House; Orlando, FL
11/20/2016*; 2:30 pm, ESPNU		vs. Arizona State; Tire Pros Invitational 5th place game	W 68–60	3–1	HP Field House; Orlando, FL
11/26/2016*; 4:00 pm, SPCSN		Charlotte	W 79–57	4–1	John M. Belk Arena (4,748); Davidson, NC
11/29/2016*; 7:00 pm		at Mercer	W 78–57	5–1	Hawkins Arena (3,228); Macon, GA
12/04/2016*; 4:00 pm		at College of Charleston	L 61–76	5–2	TD Arena (3,618); Charleston, SC
12/07/2016*; 9:00 pm, ESPN2		at No. 7 North Carolina	L 74–83	5–3	Dean Smith Center (13,178); Chapel Hill, NC
12/17/2016*; 7:00 pm, ESPN2		vs. No. 3 Kansas; Jayhawk Shootout	L 71–89	5–4	Sprint Center (17,820); Kansas City, MO
12/21/2016*; 7:00 pm		Jacksonville	W 75–60	6–4	John M. Belk Arena (3,678); Davidson, NC
12/28/2016*; 7:00 pm		Hartford	W 105–75	7–4	John M. Belk Arena (3,513); Davidson, NC
Atlantic 10 regular season
12/31/2016; 2:00 pm, ASN		Richmond	L 80–82	7–5 (0–1)	John M. Belk Arena (4,249); Davidson, NC
01/05/2017; 8:00 pm, ESPNU		at George Washington	L 69–73	7–6 (0–2)	Charles E. Smith Center (2,823); Washington, D.C.
01/08/2017; 2:00 pm, NBCSN		at Saint Louis	W 77–66	8–6 (1–2)	Chaifetz Arena (6,538); St. Louis, MO
01/11/2017; 7:00 pm		Fordham	L 54–60	8–7 (1–3)	John M. Belk Arena (3,004); Davidson, NC
01/14/2017; 2:00 pm, CBSSN		VCU	W 69–63	9–7 (2–3)	John M. Belk Arena (4,636); Davidson, NC
01/19/2017; 7:00 pm, CBSSN		at La Salle	L 83–91	9–8 (2–4)	Tom Gola Arena (1,852); Philadelphia, PA
01/24/2017; 7:00 pm, SPCSN		Duquesne	W 74–60	10–8 (3–4)	John M. Belk Arena (5,315); Davidson, NC
01/28/2017; 12:00 pm, NBCSN		at Fordham	W 84–66	11–8 (4–4)	Rose Hill Gymnasium (3,123); Bronx, NY
01/31/2017; 8:00 pm, ASN		at Saint Joseph's	W 75–60	12–8 (5–4)	Hagan Arena (3,461); Philadelphia, PA
02/03/2017; 7:00 pm, ESPN2		Rhode Island	L 59–70	12–9 (5–5)	John M. Belk Arena (5,244); Davidson, NC
02/08/2017; 7:00 pm, ASN		George Mason	L 69–76	12–10 (5–6)	John M. Belk Arena (3,647); Davidson, NC
02/11/2017; 8:00 pm, CBSSN		at VCU	L 60–74	12–11 (5–7)	Siegel Center (7,637); Richmond, VA
02/15/2017; 7:00 pm, ASN		George Washington	W 74–63	13–11 (6–7)	John M. Belk Arena (3,715); Davidson, NC
02/18/2017; 12:00 pm, NBCSN		at Massachusetts	W 79–74	14–11 (7–7)	Mullins Center (3,219); Amherst, MA
02/21/2017; 8:00 pm, CBSSN		at Richmond	L 76–84	14–12 (7–8)	Robins Center (6,199); Richmond, VA
02/24/2017; 4:00 pm, ESPN2		Dayton	L 82–89	14–13 (7–9)	John M. Belk Arena (4,889); Davidson, NC
02/28/2017; 7:00 pm, ASN		St. Bonaventure	W 68–63	15–13 (8–9)	John M. Belk Arena (3,570); Davidson, NC
03/04/2017; 6:00 pm, ASN		at Rhode Island	L 70–73 ^{OT}	15–14 (8–10)	Ryan Center (7,623); Kingston, RI
Atlantic 10 tournament
03/09/2017; 12:00 pm, NBCSN	(9)	vs. (8) LaSalle; Second round	W 82–73	16–14	PPG Paints Arena (7,509); Pittsburgh, PA
03/10/2017; 12:00 pm, NBCSN	(9)	vs. (1) Dayton; Quarterfinals	W 73–67	17–14	PPG Paints Arena (6,641); Pittsburgh, PA
03/11/2017; 1:00 pm, CBSSN	(9)	vs. (4) Rhode Island; Semifinals	L 60–84	17–15	PPG Paints Arena (6,641); Pittsburgh, PA
*Non-conference game. ^{#}Rankings from AP Poll. (#) Tournament seedings in parentheses. All times are in Eastern Time.

== See also ==
- 2016–17 Davidson Wildcats women's basketball team
