= 2016–17 Fordham Rams men's basketball team =

American college basketball season

2016–17 Fordham Rams men's basketball
- Conference: Atlantic 10
- Record: 13–19 (7–11 A-10)
- Head coach: Jeff Neubauer (2nd season)
- Assistant coaches: Rodney Crawford; Ali Ton; Michael DePaoli
- Home arena: Rose Hill Gymnasium

2016–17 Atlantic 10 men's basketball standings
| | Conf. | | | | Overall |
| Team | W | | L | PCT | W | | L | PCT |
|---|---|---|---|---|---|---|---|---|
| Dayton | 15 | – | 3 | .833 | 24 | – | 8 | .750 |
| VCU | 14 | – | 4 | .778 | 26 | – | 9 | .743 |
| Rhode Island † | 13 | – | 5 | .722 | 25 | – | 10 | .714 |
| Richmond | 13 | – | 5 | .722 | 22 | – | 13 | .629 |
| Saint Bonaventure | 11 | – | 7 | .611 | 20 | – | 12 | .625 |
| George Washington | 10 | – | 8 | .556 | 20 | – | 15 | .571 |
| George Mason | 9 | – | 9 | .500 | 20 | – | 14 | .588 |
| La Salle | 9 | – | 9 | .500 | 15 | – | 15 | .500 |
| Davidson | 8 | – | 10 | .444 | 17 | – | 15 | .531 |
| Fordham | 7 | – | 11 | .389 | 13 | – | 19 | .406 |
| Saint Louis | 6 | – | 12 | .333 | 12 | – | 21 | .364 |
| UMass | 4 | – | 14 | .222 | 15 | – | 18 | .455 |
| Saint Joseph's | 4 | – | 14 | .222 | 11 | – | 20 | .355 |
| Duquesne | 3 | – | 15 | .167 | 10 | – | 22 | .313 |
† 2017 A10 Tournament winner

The 2016–17 Fordham Rams men's basketball team represented Fordham University during the 2016–17 NCAA Division I men's basketball season. The Rams, led by second-year head coach Jeff Neubauer, played their home games at Rose Hill Gymnasium in The Bronx, New York as a member of the Atlantic 10 Conference. They finished the season 13–19, 7–11 in A-10 play to finish in tenth place. They received the No. 10 seed in the A-10 tournament where they lost in the second round to George Mason.

== Previous season ==
The Rams finished the 2015–16 season 17–14, 8–10 in A-10 play to finish in eighth place. They lost in the second round of the A-10 tournament to Richmond. They were invited to the CollegeInsdier.com Tournament where they lost in the first round to Boston University.

== Offseason ==
=== Departures ===
| Name | Number | Pos. | Height | Weight | Year | Hometown | Notes |
|---|---|---|---|---|---|---|---|
| Nych Smith | 1 | G | 5'11" | 187 | Freshman | Memphis, TN | Transferred to Florida SouthWestern State College |
| Jashire Hardnett | 4 | G | 5'11" | 170 | Freshman | Gulfport, MS | Transferred to Chipola College |
| Jon Severe | 10 | G | 6'2" | 185 | Junior | Brooklyn, NY | Transferred to Iona |
| Mandell Thomas | 23 | G | 6'2" | 185 | Senior | Rochester, NY | Graduated |
| Ryan Rhoomes | 30 | F | 6'8" | 235 | Senior | South Jamaica, NY | Graduated |
| Ryan Canty | 42 | C | 6'9" | 240 | RS Senior | Danvers, MA | Graduated |

=== Incoming transfers ===
| Name | Number | Pos. | Height | Weight | Year | Hometown | Previous School |
|---|---|---|---|---|---|---|---|
| Will Tavares | 5 | G | 6'6" | 205 | Junior | Providence, RI | Junior college transferred to Monroe Community College. |
| Perris Hicks | 23 | G | 6'1" | 180 | Junior | Pasadena, CA | Junior college transferred from San Bernardino Valley College. |
| JaVontae Hawkins | 32 | G | 6'5" | 211 | RS Senior | Flint, MI | Transferred from Eastern Kentucky. Will be eligible to play immediately since Hawkins graduated from Eastern Kentucky. |

=== 2016 recruiting class ===
College recruiting information
| Name | Hometown | School | Height | Weight | Commit date |
|---|---|---|---|---|---|
| Chuba Ohams; SF | Bronx, NY | Putnam Science Academy | 6 ft 7 in (2.01 m) | 190 lb (86 kg) | Mar 5, 2016 |
| Chuba Ohams; SF | Recruit ratings: Scout: Rivals: (POST) | | | | |
Overall recruit ranking:
Note: In many cases, Scout, Rivals, 247Sports, On3, and ESPN may conflict in their listings of height and weight.; In these cases, the average was taken. ESPN grades are on a 100-point scale.; Sources: "2016 Team Ranking". Rivals.

== Preseason ==
Fordham was picked to finish in 11th place in the preseason A-10 poll.

== Roster ==
2016–17 Fordham Rams men's basketball team
Players
Coaches

| Pos. | # | Name | Height | Weight | Year | Previous school | Hometown |
|---|---|---|---|---|---|---|---|
| G | 0 | Antwoine Anderson | 6 ft 1 in (1.85 m) | 190 lb (86 kg) | RS Jr | Bishop Kearney High School | Rochester, New York |
| F | 1 | Chuba Ohams | 6 ft 8 in (2.03 m) | 205 lb (93 kg) | Fr | Wadleigh High School | Bronx, New York |
| G | 2 | Thomas Sanchez | 5 ft 9 in (1.75 m) | 155 lb (70 kg) | Jr | Xavier High School | Maspeth, New York |
| G | 3 | Nemanja Zarkovic | 6 ft 3 in (1.91 m) | 195 lb (88 kg) | Jr | Collège Jean-de-Brébeuf | Montreal, Quebec, Canada |
| F | 4 | Brenton Petty | 5 ft 9 in (1.75 m) | 150 lb (68 kg) | So | Woodrow Wilson Bosco High School | Washington, D.C. |
| G | 5 | Will Tavares | 6 ft 6 in (1.98 m) | 205 lb (93 kg) | Jr | Bishop Hendricken High School; Monroe Community College | Providence, Rhode Island |
| G | 10 | Sinan Saglam | 6 ft 6 in (1.98 m) | 195 lb (88 kg) | Fr | Istanbul Avcilar Doga HS | Istanbul, Turkey |
| G | 12 | Joseph Chartouny | 6 ft 3 in (1.91 m) | 205 lb (93 kg) | So | Collège Jean-de-Brébeuf | Montreal, Quebec, Canada |
| G | 13 | Matt Massimino | 5 ft 11 in (1.8 m) | 170 lb (77 kg) | Sr | New Hope-Solebury High School | New Hope, Pennsylvania |
| F | 14 | Chris Downing | 6 ft 8 in (2.03 m) | 235 lb (107 kg) | So | Don Bosco Prep | Orangeburg, New York |
| G | 15 | Cavit Havsa | 6 ft 4 in (1.93 m) | 160 lb (73 kg) | Fr | Esenyurt Okyanus High School | Istanbul, Turkey |
| F | 21 | Jesse Bunting | 6 ft 8 in (2.03 m) | 225 lb (102 kg) | So | Tabor Academy | Plymouth, Massachusetts |
| G | 23 | Perris Hicks | 6 ft 1 in (1.85 m) | 180 lb (82 kg) | Jr | Pasadena High School; San Bernardino Valley College | Los Angeles, California |
| F | 24 | Prokop Slanina | 6 ft 10 in (2.08 m) | 225 lb (102 kg) | So | ASA College | Brno, Czech Republic |
| G | 32 | Javontae Hawkins | 6 ft 5 in (1.96 m) | 211 lb (96 kg) | GS | Huntington Prep; Eastern Kentucky | Flint, Michigan |
| F | 33 | David Pekárek | 6 ft 7 in (2.01 m) | 210 lb (95 kg) | So | Get Better Academy | Olomouc, Czech Republic |
| F | 43 | Christian Sengfelder | 6 ft 7 in (2.01 m) | 238 lb (108 kg) | Jr | Urspring Academy | Leverkusen, Germany |

Head coach

- Jeff Neubauer (La Salle)

Assistant coach(es)

- Rodney Crawford (Cincinnati)
- Ali Ton (Davidson)
- Michael DePaoli (College of Saint Rose)

Legend

- (C) Team captain
- (S) Suspended
- (I) Ineligible
- (W) Walk-on
- Injured
- Current redshirt

Roster

== Schedule and results ==
| Date time, TV | Rank^{#} | Opponent^{#} | Result | Record | Site (attendance) city, state |
Non-conference regular season
| 11/11/2016*; 7:00 pm | | at East Tennessee State | L 59–96 | 0–1 | Freedom Hall Civic Center (3,309); Johnson City, TN |
| 11/14/2016*; 7:00 pm | | New York Tech | W 101–75 | 1–1 | Rose Hill Gymnasium (1,351); Bronx, NY |
| 11/18/2016*; 6:00 pm | | Fairleigh Dickinson; Johnny Bach Classic | W 68–55 | 2–1 | Rose Hill Gymnasium (1,533); Bronx, NY |
| 11/19/2016*; 3:00 pm | | Saint Peter's; Johnny Bach Classic | W 63–41 | 3–1 | Rose Hill Gymnasium (1,473); Bronx, NY |
| 11/20/2016*; 3:30 pm | | Lipscomb; Johnny Bach Classic | W 85–69 | 4–1 | Rose Hill Gymnasium (1,003); Bronx, NY |
| 11/23/2016*; 2:00 pm | | Rider | W 73–62 | 5–1 | Rose Hill Gymnasium (1,023); Bronx, NY |
| 11/26/2016*; 5:00 pm | | Texas–Arlington | L 63–67 | 5–2 | Rose Hill Gymnasium (1,096); Bronx, NY |
| 11/30/2016*; 7:00 pm | | Sacred Heart | L 70–71 | 5–3 | Rose Hill Gymnasium (1,002); Bronx, NY |
| 12/03/2016*; 2:00 pm | | at Harvard | L 52–64 | 5–4 | Lavietes Pavilion (1,714); Cambridge, MA |
| 12/08/2016*; 6:30 pm, FS1 | | at St. John's; Rivalry | L 62–90 | 5–5 | Carnesecca Arena (4,474); Queens, NY |
| 12/10/2016*; 7:00 pm | | at Manhattan | L 53–60 | 5–6 | Draddy Gymnasium (1,981); Riverdale, NY |
| 12/18/2016*; 1:00 pm | | vs. Rutgers; MSG Holiday Festival | L 53–68 | 5–7 | Madison Square Garden (8,200); New York City, NY |
| 12/21/2016*; 7:00 pm | | Central Connecticut | W 83–60 | 6–7 | Rose Hill Gymnasium (954); Bronx, NY |
Atlantic 10 regular season
| 12/30/2016; 7:00 pm | | Duquesne | L 72–75 | 6–8 (0–1) | Rose Hill Gymnasium (1,673); Bronx, NY |
| 01/04/2017; 7:00 pm | | at Richmond | L 72–80 | 6–9 (0–2) | Robins Center (5,004); Richmond, VA |
| 01/07/2017; 3:00 pm, NBCSN | | Saint Joseph's | L 55–70 | 6–10 (0–3) | Rose Hill Gymnasium (2,575); Bronx, NY |
| 01/11/2017; 7:00 pm | | at Davidson | W 60–54 | 7–10 (1–3) | John M. Belk Arena (3,004); Davidson, NC |
| 01/14/2017; 4:30 pm, NBCSN | | vs. St. Bonaventure; Lightower Conference Classic | L 53–73 | 7–11 (1–4) | Blue Cross Arena (6,386); Rochester, NY |
| 01/18/2017; 7:00 pm | | VCU | W 69–67 ^{OT} | 8–11 (2–4) | Rose Hill Gymnasium (2,186); Bronx, NY |
| 01/21/2017; 12:30 pm, NBCSN | | at Massachusetts | W 71–68 | 9–11 (3–4) | Mullins Center (3,423); Amherst, MA |
| 01/28/2017; 12:00 pm, NBCSN | | Davidson | L 66–84 | 9–12 (3–5) | Rose Hill Gymnasium (3,123); Bronx, NY |
| 01/31/2017; 9:00 pm, CBSSN | | Dayton | L 66–75 | 9–13 (3–6) | Rose Hill Gymnasium (2,412); Bronx, NY |
| 02/04/2017; 6:00 pm, ASN | | at Saint Joseph's | W 86–83 ^{2OT} | 10–13 (4–6) | Hagan Arena (4,200); Philadelphia, PA |
| 02/08/2017; 7:00 pm | | La Salle | L 52–67 | 10–14 (4–7) | Rose Hill Gymnasium (2,156); Bronx, NY |
| 02/11/2017; 7:00 pm, ASN | | at George Mason | L 67–73 | 10–15 (4–8) | EagleBank Arena (6,676); Fairfax, VA |
| 02/15/2017; 7:00 pm | | at Rhode Island | W 53–43 | 11–15 (5–8) | Ryan Center (3,791); Kingston, RI |
| 02/18/2017; 2:00 pm | | Saint Louis | W 54–40 | 12–15 (6–8) | Rose Hill Gymnasium (2,431); Bronx, NY |
| 02/22/2017; 7:00 pm | | at Duquesne | W 70–52 | 13–15 (7–8) | Palumbo Center (1,141); Pittsburgh, PA |
| 02/25/2017; 2:30 pm, NBCSN | | Richmond | L 48–70 | 13–16 (7–9) | Rose Hill Gymnasium (3,023); Bronx, NY |
| 03/01/2017; 7:00 pm | | George Washington | L 66–67 | 13–17 (7–10) | Rose Hill Gymnasium (2,153); Bronx, NY |
| 03/04/2017; 2:00 pm | | at La Salle | L 54–66 | 13–18 (7–11) | Tom Gola Arena (1,412); Philadelphia, PA |
Atlantic 10 tournament
| 03/09/2017; 6:00 pm, NBCSN | (10) | vs. (7) George Mason; Second round | L 71–82 | 13–19 | PPG Paints Arena (5,442); Pittsburgh, PA |
*Non-conference game. ^{#}Rankings from AP Poll. (#) Tournament seedings in parentheses. All times are in Eastern Time.

== See also ==
2016–17 Fordham Rams women's basketball team
