= 2016–17 Saint Joseph's Hawks men's basketball team =

American college basketball season

2016–17 Saint Joseph's Hawks men's basketball
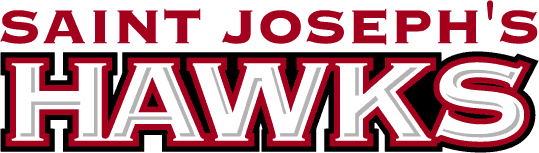
- Conference: Atlantic 10 Conference
- Record: 11–20 (4–14 A-10)
- Head coach: Phil Martelli (22nd season)
- Assistant coaches: Mark Bass; David Duda; Geoff Arnold
- Home arena: Hagan Arena

2016–17 Atlantic 10 men's basketball standings
	Conf.				Overall
Team	W		L	PCT	W		L	PCT
Dayton	15	–	3	.833	24	–	8	.750
VCU	14	–	4	.778	26	–	9	.743
Rhode Island †	13	–	5	.722	25	–	10	.714
Richmond	13	–	5	.722	22	–	13	.629
Saint Bonaventure	11	–	7	.611	20	–	12	.625
George Washington	10	–	8	.556	20	–	15	.571
George Mason	9	–	9	.500	20	–	14	.588
La Salle	9	–	9	.500	15	–	15	.500
Davidson	8	–	10	.444	17	–	15	.531
Fordham	7	–	11	.389	13	–	19	.406
Saint Louis	6	–	12	.333	12	–	21	.364
UMass	4	–	14	.222	15	–	18	.455
Saint Joseph's	4	–	14	.222	11	–	20	.355
Duquesne	3	–	15	.167	10	–	22	.313
† 2017 A10 Tournament winner

The 2016–17 Saint Joseph's Hawks basketball team represented Saint Joseph's University during the 2016–17 NCAA Division I men's basketball season. The Hawks, led by 22nd-year head coach Phil Martelli, played their home games at Hagan Arena in Philadelphia, Pennsylvania as members of the Atlantic 10 Conference. They finished the season 11–20, 4–14 A-10 play to finish in a tie for 12th place. As the No. 13 seed in the A-10 tournament, they lost to Massachusetts in the first round.

== Previous season ==
The Hawks finished the 2015–16 season with a record of 28–8, 13–5 in A-10 play to finish in fourth place. They defeated George Washington, Dayton, and VCU to be with the A-10 tournament and earn the conference's automatic bid to the NCAA tournament. As a #8 seed, they defeated Cincinnati in the first round, their first NCAA Tournament victory since 2004, to advance to the second round where they lost to Oregon. DeAndre' Bembry was named A-10 player of the year.

== Preseason ==
Saint Joseph's was picked to finish in ninth place in the Preseason A-10 poll.

== Offseason ==
=== Departures ===
Name	Number	Pos.	Height	Weight	Year	Hometown	Notes
Aaron Brown	2	G	6'5"	223	RS Senior	Darby, PA	Graduated
Papa Ndao	12	F	6'8"	220	RS Senior	Dakar, Sengal	Graduated
Isaiah Miles	15	F	6'7"	227	Senior	Baltimore, MD	Graduated
Skylar Scrivano	33	F	6'10"	233	RS Senior	Doylestown, PA	Graduated & transferred
DeAndre' Bembry	43	F	6'6"	210	Junior	Charlotte, NC	Declare for 2016 NBA draft

=== 2016 recruiting class ===
College recruiting information
Name	Hometown	School	Height	Weight	Commit date
Charlie Brown Jr. SG	St. Thomas More School	Philadelphia, PA	6 ft 6 in (1.98 m)	180 lb (82 kg)	
Charlie Brown Jr. SG	Recruit ratings: Scout: Rivals: 247Sports: ESPN: (POST)				
Gerald Blount #110 PF	Jersey City, NJ	Pomfret School	6 ft 7 in (2.01 m)	205 lb (93 kg)	Nov 10, 2015
Gerald Blount #110 PF	Recruit ratings: Scout: Rivals: 247Sports: ESPN: (59)				
Nick Robinson; SG	Chicago, IL	Kenwood Academy High School	6 ft 6 in (1.98 m)	N/A	Apr 13, 2016
Nick Robinson; SG	Recruit ratings: Scout: Rivals: 247Sports: ESPN: (NR)				
Lorenzo Edwards; PF	Lake Forest, IL	Lake Forest High School	6 ft 7 in (2.01 m)	200 lb (91 kg)	
Lorenzo Edwards; PF	Recruit ratings: Scout: Rivals: 247Sports: ESPN: (NR)				
Overall recruit ranking:
Note: In many cases, Scout, Rivals, 247Sports, On3, and ESPN may conflict in their listings of height and weight.; In these cases, the average was taken. ESPN grades are on a 100-point scale.; Sources: "Saint Joseph's Hawks". ESPN.; "2016 Team Ranking". Rivals.

=== 2017 recruiting class ===
College recruiting information (2017)
Name	Hometown	School	Height	Weight	Commit date
Taylor Funk #46 PF	Manheim Central High School	Manheim, PA	6 ft 8 in (2.03 m)	N/A	May 12, 2016
Taylor Funk #46 PF	Recruit ratings: Scout: Rivals: 247Sports: ESPN: (77)				
Overall recruit ranking:
Note: In many cases, Scout, Rivals, 247Sports, On3, and ESPN may conflict in their listings of height and weight.; In these cases, the average was taken. ESPN grades are on a 100-point scale.; Sources: "Saint Joseph's Hawks". ESPN.; "2017 Team Ranking". Rivals.

== Roster ==
2016–17 Saint Joseph's Hawks men's basketball team
Players
Coaches

Pos.	#	Name	Height	Weight	Year	Previous school	Hometown
G	0	Lamarr Kimble	6 ft 0 in (1.83 m)	190 lb (86 kg)	So	Neumann-Goretti	Philadelphia, PA
G	1	Shavar Newkirk (injured)	6 ft 0 in (1.83 m)	180 lb (82 kg)	Jr	Cardinal Hayes	Bronx, NY
F	2	Charlie Brown Jr.	6 ft 6 in (1.98 m)	185 lb (84 kg)	Fr	St. Thomas More School	Philadelphia, PA
G	3	Mike Booth (W)	6 ft 3 in (1.91 m)	200 lb (91 kg)	Jr	Bishop Shanahan	Thornton, PA
G	5	Nick Robinson	6 ft 6 in (1.98 m)	201 lb (91 kg)	Fr	Kenwood Academy	Chicago, IL
F	10	Gerald Blount	6 ft 6 in (1.98 m)	220 lb (100 kg)	Fr	Pomfret School	Bayonne, NJ
G	11	Toliver Freeman (W)	6 ft 3 in (1.91 m)	213 lb (97 kg)	Fr	Catholic	Baton Rouge, LA
G	13	Christian Vega (W)	6 ft 0 in (1.83 m)	175 lb (79 kg)	Jr	Colegio San José	Guaynabo, PR
G	15	Chris Clover	6 ft 3 in (1.91 m)	213 lb (97 kg)	So	St. Joseph's Prep	Philadelphia, PA
F	20	Brendan Casper (W)	6 ft 6 in (1.98 m)	213 lb (97 kg)	Sr	Methacton	Audubon, PA
G	21	Kyle Thompson (W)	6 ft 2 in (1.88 m)	190 lb (86 kg)	Jr	St. Joseph's Prep	Mt. Laurel, NJ
F	22	Lorenzo Edwards	6 ft 7 in (2.01 m)	222 lb (101 kg)	Fr	Lake Forest	Lake Forest, IL
F	23	Markell Lodge	6 ft 7 in (2.01 m)	214 lb (97 kg)	RS So	Christian Faith Center Academy	Creedmoor, NC
F	24	Pierfrancesco Oliva	6 ft 8 in (2.03 m)	207 lb (94 kg)	So	Bergen Catholic	Taranto, Italy
F	25	James Demery	6 ft 6 in (1.98 m)	198 lb (90 kg)	Jr	Northside Christian	Greenville, NC
F	32	Jai Williams	6 ft 9 in (2.06 m)	240 lb (109 kg)	RS Jr	Philadelphia Electrical & Technical Charter	Philadelphia, PA
F	34	Javon Baumann	6 ft 8 in (2.03 m)	255 lb (116 kg)	RS Sr	Theodor-Heus School	Solms-Oberbiel, Germany

Head coach

- Phil Martelli (Widener)

Assistant coach(es)

- Mark Bass (Saint Joseph's)
- David Duda (Spring Garden)
- Geoff Arnold (Saint Joseph's)

Legend

- (C) Team captain
- (S) Suspended
- (I) Ineligible
- (W) Walk-on
- Injured
- Current redshirt

Roster

== Schedule and results ==
Date time, TV	Rank^{#}	Opponent^{#}	Result	Record	Site (attendance) city, state
Regular season
11/12/2016*; 7:00 pm		Toledo	W 77–76	1–0	Hagan Arena (4,200); Philadelphia, PA
11/14/2016*; 7:00 pm		Columbia	W 85–65	2–0	Hagan Arena (3,543); Philadelphia, PA
11/18/2016*; 12:30 pm		vs. Loyola–Chicago; Paradise Jam quarterfinals	W 71–57	3–0	Sports and Fitness Center (512); St. Thomas, VI
11/20/2016*; 6:00 pm, CBSSN		vs. Ole Miss; Paradise Jam semifinals	L 66–81	3–1	Sports and Fitness Center (2,755); St. Thomas, VI
11/21/2016*; 6:00 pm, CBSSN		vs. NC State; Paradise Jam 3rd place game	L 63–73	3–2	Sports and Fitness Center (2,699); St. Thomas, VI
11/30/2016*; 7:00 pm, CBSSN		Temple; Rivalry	L 72–78	3–3	Hagan Arena (4,200); Philadelphia, PA
12/03/2016*; 1:00 pm, CBSSN		at No. 2 Villanova; Holy War	L 57–88	3–4	The Pavilion (6,500); Villanova, PA
12/11/2016*; 6:00 pm		at Drexel	W 72–71	4–4	Daskalakis Athletic Center (1,252); Philadelphia, PA
12/14/2016*; 8:00 pm		at Princeton	W 76–68	5–4	Jadwin Gymnasium (2,360); Princeton, NJ
12/18/2016*; 4:00 pm		at Illinois State	L 72–81	5–5	Redbird Arena (3,924); Normal, IL
12/21/2016*; 7:00 pm		Lafayette	W 92–63	6–5	Hagan Arena (3,411); Philadelphia, PA
12/30/2016; 7:00 pm		George Washington	W 68–63	7–5 (1–0)	Hagan Arena (4,200); Philadelphia, PA
01/03/2017; 7:00 pm, CBSSN		at Rhode Island	L 58–88	7–6 (1–1)	Ryan Center; Kingston, RI
01/07/2017; 3:00 pm, NBCSN		at Fordham	W 70–55	8–6 (2–1)	Rose Hill Gymnasium (2,575); Bronx, NY
01/10/2017; 7:00 pm, ASN		George Mason	L 67–75	8–7 (2–2)	Hagan Arena (3,051); Philadelphia, PA
01/14/2017; 12:30 pm, NBCSN		Richmond	L 66–70	8–8 (2–3)	Hagan Arena (4,051); Philadelphia, PA
01/18/2017; 7:00 pm, ASN		at Massachusetts	L 57–62	8–9 (2–4)	Mullins Center (2,370); Amherst, MA
01/21/2017*; 7:00 pm		at Penn	W 78–71	9–9	Palestra (8,590); Philadelphia, PA
01/24/2017; 7:00 pm, ASN		at St. Bonaventure	L 63–67	9–10 (2–5)	Reilly Center (3,961); Olean, NY
01/28/2017; 6:00 pm, ASN		La Salle	W 73–72	10–10 (3–5)	Hagan Arena (4,200); Philadelphia, PA
01/31/2017; 8:00 pm, ASN		Davidson	L 60–75	10–11 (3–6)	Hagan Arena (3,461); Philadelphia, PA
02/04/2017; 6:00 pm, ASN		Fordham	L 83–86 ^{2OT}	10–12 (3–7)	Hagan Arena (4,200); Philadelphia, PA
02/07/2017; 8:00 pm, ASN		at Dayton	L 70–77	10–13 (3–8)	UD Arena (12,612); Dayton, OH
02/11/2017; 2:30 pm, NBCSN		Massachusetts	L 76–87	10–14 (3–9)	Hagan Arena (4,200); Philadelphia, PA
02/14/2017; 6:00 pm, CBSSN		at VCU	L 81–91	10–15 (3–10)	Siegel Center (7,637); Richmond, VA
02/18/2017; 4:00 pm, CBSSN		at La Salle	L 68–83	10–16 (3–11)	Tom Gola Arena (3,400); Philadelphia, PA
02/22/2017; 7:00 pm		St. Bonaventure	L 77–83	10–17 (3–12)	Hagan Arena (3,743); Philadelphia, PA
02/25/2017; 4:30 pm, NBCSN		at Saint Louis	L 60–61	10–18 (3–13)	Chaifetz Arena (6,079); St. Louis, MO
03/01/2017; 7:00 pm, ASN		Rhode Island	L 49–68	10–19 (3–14)	Hagan Arena (3,451); Philadelphia, PA
03/04/2017; 2:00 pm		at Duquesne	W 63–60	11–19 (4–14)	Palumbo Center (1,464); Pittsburgh, PA
Atlantic 10 tournament
03/08/2017; 6:00 pm, ASN	(13)	vs. (12) Massachusetts; First round	L 63–70	11–20	PPG Paints Arena (5,517); Pittsburgh, PA
*Non-conference game. ^{#}Rankings from AP Poll. (#) Tournament seedings in parentheses. All times are in Eastern Time.
