= 2016–17 Rhode Island Rams men's basketball team =

American college basketball season

2016–17 Rhode Island Rams men's basketball

Atlantic 10 tournament champions

NCAA tournament, Second Round
- Conference: Atlantic 10 Conference
- Record: 25–10 (13–5 A-10)
- Head coach: Dan Hurley (5th season)
- Assistant coaches: David Cox; Luke Murray; Antonio Reynolds Dean
- Home arena: Ryan Center

2016–17 Atlantic 10 men's basketball standings
	Conf.				Overall
Team	W		L	PCT	W		L	PCT
Dayton	15	–	3	.833	24	–	8	.750
VCU	14	–	4	.778	26	–	9	.743
Rhode Island †	13	–	5	.722	25	–	10	.714
Richmond	13	–	5	.722	22	–	13	.629
Saint Bonaventure	11	–	7	.611	20	–	12	.625
George Washington	10	–	8	.556	20	–	15	.571
George Mason	9	–	9	.500	20	–	14	.588
La Salle	9	–	9	.500	15	–	15	.500
Davidson	8	–	10	.444	17	–	15	.531
Fordham	7	–	11	.389	13	–	19	.406
Saint Louis	6	–	12	.333	12	–	21	.364
UMass	4	–	14	.222	15	–	18	.455
Saint Joseph's	4	–	14	.222	11	–	20	.355
Duquesne	3	–	15	.167	10	–	22	.313
† 2017 A10 Tournament winner

The 2016–17 Rhode Island Rams basketball team represented the University of Rhode Island during the 2016–17 NCAA Division I men's basketball season. The Rams, led by fifth-year head coach Dan Hurley, played their home games at the Ryan Center in Kingston, Rhode Island as members of the Atlantic 10 Conference. They finished the season 25–10, 13–5 in A-10 play to finish in a tie for third place. In the A-10 tournament, they defeated St. Bonaventure, Davidson, and VCU to win the A-10 Tournament championship. As a result, they received the conference's automatic bid to the NCAA tournament. They received a No. 11 seed in the Midwest region where they defeated No. 6-seeded Creighton in the first round before losing to No. 3-seeded Oregon in the second round.

== Previous season ==
The Rams finished the 2015–16 season 17–15, 9–9 in A-10 play to finish in seventh place. They lost in the second round of the A-10 tournament to Massachusetts.

== Departures ==
Name	Number	Pos.	Height	Weight	Year	Hometown	Notes
Four McGlynn	4	G	6'2"	200	RS Senior	York, PA	Graduated
Rex Sunahara	10	F	6'5"	200	Freshman	Bay Village, OH	Walk-on; didn't return
Ifeanyi Onyekaba	14	C	6'8"	265	Senior	Abuja, Nigeria	Graduate transferred
Shane Plunkett	30	G	6'3"	195	Senior	Brookville, NY	Graduated
Earl Watson	33	C	6'7"	245	Senior	Fort Pierce, FL	Graduated

== Incoming recruits ==
College recruiting information
Name	Hometown	School	Height	Weight	Commit date
Mike Layssard Jr. #36 C	Shreveport, LA	Northwood Senior High School	6 ft 9 in (2.06 m)	280 lb (130 kg)	Sep 12, 2015
Mike Layssard Jr. #36 C	Recruit ratings: Scout: Rivals: (77)				
Jeff Dowtin #43 PG	Washington, D.C.	Saint John's College High School	6 ft 3 in (1.91 m)	165 lb (75 kg)	Sep 27, 2015
Jeff Dowtin #43 PG	Recruit ratings: Scout: Rivals: (76)				
Michael Tertsea #43 C	Bel Aire, MD	The John Carroll School	6 ft 9 in (2.06 m)	220 lb (100 kg)	Sep 20, 2015
Michael Tertsea #43 C	Recruit ratings: Scout: Rivals: (74)				
Cyril Langevine #66 PF	East Orange, NJ	The Patrick School	6 ft 8 in (2.03 m)	200 lb (91 kg)	Sep 24, 2015
Cyril Langevine #66 PF	Recruit ratings: Scout: Rivals: (70)				
Overall recruit ranking:
Note: In many cases, Scout, Rivals, 247Sports, On3, and ESPN may conflict in their listings of height and weight.; In these cases, the average was taken. ESPN grades are on a 100-point scale.; Sources: "2016 Team Ranking". Rivals.

=== Class of 2017 recruits ===
College recruiting information (2017)
Name	Hometown	School	Height	Weight	Commit date
Daron Russell; PG	Philadelphia, PA	Imhotep Institute	5 ft 10 in (1.78 m)	150 lb (68 kg)	Sep 20, 2016
Daron Russell; PG	Recruit ratings: Scout: Rivals: (79)				
Overall recruit ranking:
Note: In many cases, Scout, Rivals, 247Sports, On3, and ESPN may conflict in their listings of height and weight.; In these cases, the average was taken. ESPN grades are on a 100-point scale.; Sources: "2017 Team Ranking". Rivals.

== Preseason ==
The Rams were picked to finish second in the Preseason A-10 poll. E.C. Matthews and Hassan Martin were named to the All-Conference Preseason Second Team. Martin was named to the All-Defensive Preseason Team as well.

== Roster ==
2016–17 Rhode Island Rams men's basketball team
Players
Coaches

Pos.	#	Name	Height	Weight	Year	Previous school	Hometown
G	0	E. C. Matthews	6 ft 5 in (1.96 m)	200 lb (91 kg)	RS Jr	Romulus	Detroit, MI
G	1	Jarvis Garrett	6 ft 0 in (1.83 m)	175 lb (79 kg)	Jr	Notre Dame Prep	Milwaukee, WI
G	5	Will Leviton (W)	5 ft 8 in (1.73 m)	150 lb (68 kg)	So	Classical	Providence, RI
F	10	Cyril Langevine	6 ft 7 in (2.01 m)	225 lb (102 kg)	Fr	The Patrick School	East Orange, NJ
G	11	Jeff Dowtin	6 ft 3 in (1.91 m)	170 lb (77 kg)	Fr	St. John's	Washington, D.C.
F	12	Hassan Martin	6 ft 7 in (2.01 m)	235 lb (107 kg)	Sr	Curtis	Staten Island, NY
G	13	Stanford Robinson	6 ft 4 in (1.93 m)	200 lb (91 kg)	RS Jr	Findlay Prep; Indiana	Landover, MD
G	15	Eric Dadika (W)	6 ft 0 in (1.83 m)	175 lb (79 kg)	Fr	Spotswood	Milltown, NJ
F	21	Mike Layssard Jr.	6 ft 9 in (2.06 m)	255 lb (116 kg)	Fr	Northwood	Lena, LA
F	23	Kuran Iverson	6 ft 9 in (2.06 m)	215 lb (98 kg)	Sr	Fishburne Military Academy; Memphis	Windsor, CT
G	25	Christion Thompson	6 ft 4 in (1.93 m)	190 lb (86 kg)	So	Madison Prep	Baton Rouge, LA
G	32	Jared Terrell	6 ft 3 in (1.91 m)	215 lb (98 kg)	Jr	Brewster Academy	Weymouth, MA
F	34	Andre Berry	6 ft 8 in (2.03 m)	275 lb (125 kg)	Jr	St. Andrew's; New Mexico Military Institute	West Hempstead, NY
F	45	Nicola Akele	6 ft 7 in (2.01 m)	215 lb (98 kg)	So	IMG Academy	Treviso, Italy
C	55	Michael Tertsea (redshirt)	6 ft 10 in (2.08 m)	230 lb (104 kg)	Fr	John Carroll School	Makurdi, Nigeria

Head coach

- Dan Hurley (Seton Hall)

Assistant coach(es)

- David Cox (William & Mary)
- Jim Carr (York College)
- Antonio Reynolds Dean (Rhode Island)

Legend

- (C) Team captain
- (S) Suspended
- (I) Ineligible
- (W) Walk-on
- Injured
- Current redshirt

Roster

== Schedule and results ==
Date time, TV	Rank^{#}	Opponent^{#}	Result	Record	High points	High rebounds	High assists	Site (attendance) city, state
Non-conference regular season
11/11/2016*; 7:00 pm	No. 23	Dartmouth	W 84–61	1–0	21 – Matthews	10 – Martin	4 – Robinson	Ryan Center (6,052); Kingston, RI
11/14/2016*; 7:00 pm	No. 21	Marist; Hall of Fame Tip Off	W 107–65	2–0	22 – Matthews	10 – Martin	8 – Garrett	Ryan Center (4,021); Kingston, RI
11/16/2016*; 7:00 pm	No. 21	Brown; Hall of Fame Tip Off	W 79–72	3–0	18 – Terrell	8 – Martin	5 – Garrett	Ryan Center (5,630); Kingston, RI
11/19/2016*; 3:00 pm, ESPN3	No. 21	vs. No. 24 Cincinnati; Hall of Fame Tip Off semifinals	W 76–71	4–0	18 – Matthews	10 – Iverson	5 – Iverson	Mohegan Sun Arena; Uncasville, CT
11/20/2016*; 1:00 pm, ESPN	No. 21	vs. No. 1 Duke; Hall of Fame Tip Off championship	L 65–75	4–1	22 – Terrell	6 – Martin	6 – Garrett	Mohegan Sun Arena; Uncasville, CT
11/25/2016*; 8:00 pm	No. 23	Belmont	W 82–73	5–1	31 – Martin	8 – Iverson	5 – Garrett	Ryan Center (4,626); Kingston, RI
11/29/2016*; 8:00 pm, ESPN3	No. 21	at Valparaiso	L 62–65	5–2	16 – Martin	6 – Martin	4 – Garrett	Athletics–Recreation Center (4,149); Valparaiso, IN
12/03/2016*; 4:30 pm, FSN	No. 21	at Providence; Ocean State Rivalry	L 60–63	5–3	14 – Martin	17 – Martin	3 – Garrett	Dunkin' Donuts Center (12,488); Providence, RI
12/06/2016*; 7:00 pm		Old Dominion	W 51–39	6–3	15 – Matthews	8 – Matthews	2 – Terrell	Ryan Center (4,250); Kingston, RI
12/10/2016*; 1:30 pm, ESPNU		at Houston	L 77–82	6–4	31 – Matthews	11 – Langevine	4 – Garrett	Hofheinz Pavilion (3,371); Houston, TX
12/18/2016*; 12:30 pm, MyRITV		Holy Cross	W 65–54	7–4	18 – Terrell	9 – Iverson	3 – Tied	Ryan Center (3,537); Kingston, RI
12/22/2016*; 7:00 pm, MyRITV		William & Mary	W 73–62	8–4	23 – Matthews	17 – Langevine	5 – Garrett	Ryan Center (3,570); Kingston, RI
Atlantic 10 regular season
12/30/2016; 7:00 pm, ESPNU		at Saint Louis	W 90–56	9–4 (1–0)	19 – Iverson	13 – Langevine	5 – Robinson	Chaifetz Arena (7,945); St. Louis, MO
01/03/2017; 7:00 pm, CBSSN		Saint Joseph's	W 88–58	10–4 (2–0)	24 – Terrell	10 – Langevine	7 – Garrett	Ryan Center; Kingston, RI
01/06/2017; 7:00 pm, ESPN2		at Dayton	L 64–67	10–5 (2–1)	14 – Iverson	13 – Iverson	4 – Tied	UD Arena (12,883); Dayton, OH
01/12/2017; 7:00 pm, CBSSN		La Salle	L 75–87	10–6 (2–2)	14 – Terrell	8 – Iverson	4 – Terrell	Ryan Center (3,753); Kingston, RI
01/14/2017; 2:30 pm, NBCSN		Massachusetts	W 79–77	11–6 (3–2)	22 – Matthews	6 – Iverson	4 – Dowtin	Ryan Center (6,202); Kingston, RI
01/21/2017; 2:30 pm, NBCSN		at Duquesne	W 90–69	12–6 (4–2)	20 – Martin	12 – Iverson	4 – Terrell	Palumbo Center (1,700); Pittsburgh, PA
01/25/2017; 8:00 pm, CBSSN		at Richmond	L 62–73	12–7 (4–3)	16 – Matthews	23 – Iverson	2 – 3 tied	Robins Center (5,545); Richmond, VA
01/28/2017; 4:00 pm, NBCSN		St. Bonaventure	W 71–59	13–7 (5–3)	20 – Martin	9 – Iverson	6 – Robinson	Ryan Center (6,757); Kingston, RI
01/31/2017; 7:00 pm, CBSSN		George Washington	W 82–70	14–7 (6–3)	23 – Martin	6 – Martin	4 – Tied	Ryan Center (5,190); Kingston, RI
02/03/2017; 7:00 pm, ESPN2		at Davidson	W 70–59	15–7 (7–3)	21 – Matthews	13 – Iverson	4 – Tied	John M. Belk Arena (5,244); Davidson, NC
02/07/2017; 7:00 pm, CBSSN		at Massachusetts	W 70–62	16–7 (8–3)	14 – Terrell	6 – Tied	5 – Dowtin	Mullins Center (3,512); Amherst, MA
02/10/2017; 7:00 pm, ESPN2		Dayton	L 74–75	16–8 (8–4)	20 – Iverson	7 – Iverson	3 – Robinson	Ryan Center (7,394); Kingston, RI
02/15/2017; 7:00 pm, MyRITV		Fordham	L 43–53	16–9 (8–5)	15 – Martin	7 – Martin	3 – Dowtin	Ryan Center (3,791); Kingston, RI
02/18/2017; 4:00 pm, NBCSN		at George Mason	W 77–74	17–9 (9–5)	21 – Robinson	8 – Iverson	7 – Dowtin	EagleBank Arena (6,145); Fairfax, VA
02/21/2017; 6:00 pm, CBSSN		at La Salle	W 67–56	18–9 (10–5)	24 – Terrell	10 – Iverson	7 – Dowtin	Tom Gola Arena (1,522); Philadelphia, PA
02/25/2017; 1:00 pm, ESPN2		VCU	W 69–59	19–9 (11–5)	20 – Terrell	18 – Martin	4 – Dowtin	Ryan Center (6,845); Kingston, RI
03/01/2017; 7:00 pm, ASN		at Saint Joseph's	W 68–49	20–9 (12–5)	13 – Matthews	9 – Martin	4 – Garrett	Hagan Arena (3,451); Philadelphia, PA
03/04/2017; 6:00 pm, ASN		Davidson	W 73–70 ^{OT}	21–9 (13–5)	21 – Martin	17 – Martin	3 – Terrell	Ryan Center (7,263); Kingston, RI
Atlantic 10 tournament
03/10/2017; 2:30 pm, NBCSN	(4)	vs. (5) St. Bonaventure; Quarterfinals	W 74–63	22–9	20 – Matthews	9 – Iverson	2 – Tied	PPG Paints Arena (6,641); Pittsburgh, PA
03/11/2017; 1:00 pm, CBSSN	(4)	vs. (9) Davidson; Semifinals	W 84–60	23–9	19 – Matthews	6 – 3 Tied	6 – Dowtin	PPG Paints Arena (6,886); Pittsburgh, PA
03/12/2017; 12:30 pm, CBS	(4)	vs. (2) VCU; Championship	W 70–63	24–9	20 – Terrell	10 – Langevine	4 – Dowtin	PPG Paints Arena (7,025); Pittsburgh, PA
NCAA tournament
03/17/2017*; 4:30 pm, TBS	(11 MW)	vs. (6 MW) Creighton; First Round	W 84–72	25–9	23 – Dowtin	8 – Martin	3 – Iverson	Golden 1 Center (15,833); Sacramento, CA
03/19/2017*; 7:10 pm, TBS	(11 MW)	vs. (3 MW) No. 9 Oregon; Second Round	L 72–75	25–10	21 – Robinson	9 – Langevine	6 – Terrell	Golden 1 Center (16,774); Sacramento, CA
*Non-conference game. ^{#}Rankings from AP Poll. (#) Tournament seedings in parentheses. MW=Midwest Region. All times are in Eastern Time.

== Rankings ==
Ranking movements Legend: ██ Increase in ranking ██ Decrease in ranking — = Not ranked RV = Received votes
	Week																			
Poll	Pre	1	2	3	4	5	6	7	8	9	10	11	12	13	14	15	16	17	18	Final
AP	23	21	23	21	—	—	—	—	—	—	—	—	—	—	—	—	—	—	—	Not released
Coaches	24	22	25	25	RV	RV	—	—	—	—	—	—	—	—	—	—	—	—	—	RV

*AP does not release post-NCAA Tournament rankings

== See also ==
- 2016–17 Rhode Island Rams women's basketball team
