= 2016–17 UMass Minutemen basketball team =

American college basketball season

2016–17 UMass Minutemen basketball
- Conference: Atlantic 10 Conference
- Record: 15–18 (4–14 A-10)
- Head coach: Derek Kellogg (9th season)
- Assistant coaches: Adam Ginsburg; Shyrone Chatman; Andy Allison
- Home arena: William D. Mullins Memorial Center

2016–17 Atlantic 10 men's basketball standings
	Conf.				Overall
Team	W		L	PCT	W		L	PCT
Dayton	15	–	3	.833	24	–	8	.750
VCU	14	–	4	.778	26	–	9	.743
Rhode Island †	13	–	5	.722	25	–	10	.714
Richmond	13	–	5	.722	22	–	13	.629
Saint Bonaventure	11	–	7	.611	20	–	12	.625
George Washington	10	–	8	.556	20	–	15	.571
George Mason	9	–	9	.500	20	–	14	.588
La Salle	9	–	9	.500	15	–	15	.500
Davidson	8	–	10	.444	17	–	15	.531
Fordham	7	–	11	.389	13	–	19	.406
Saint Louis	6	–	12	.333	12	–	21	.364
UMass	4	–	14	.222	15	–	18	.455
Saint Joseph's	4	–	14	.222	11	–	20	.355
Duquesne	3	–	15	.167	10	–	22	.313
† 2017 A10 Tournament winner

The 2016–17 UMass Minutemen basketball team represented the University of Massachusetts Amherst during the 2016–17 NCAA Division I men's basketball season. The Minutemen, led by ninth-year head coach Derek Kellogg, played their home games at the William D. Mullins Memorial Center in Amherst, Massachusetts as members of the Atlantic 10 Conference. They finished the season 15–18, 4–14 A-10 play to finish in a tie for 12th place. As the No. 12 seed in the A-10 tournament, they defeated Saint Joseph's in the first round before losing to St. Bonaventure in the second round.

On March 9, 2017, the school fired head coach Derek Kellogg after nine years and a 155–137 record. Shortly after Kellogg was fired, the school announced that Winthrop head coach Pat Kelsey had been hired as the new head coach at UMass. However, shortly before the press conference to announce his hiring, Kelsey announced he would not accept the position. On March 31, the school announced they had hired Chattanooga head coach Matt McCall.

== Previous season ==
The Minutemen finished the 2015–16 season 14–18, 6–12 in A-10 play to finish in a tie for tenth place. They defeated Rhode Island in the second round of the A-10 tournament to advance to the quarterfinals where they lost to VCU.

== Offseason ==
=== Departures ===
Name	Number	Pos.	Height	Weight	Year	Hometown	Notes
Antwan Space	3	F	6'9"	235	RS Senior	DeSoto, TX	Graduated
Jabarie Hinds	5	G	5'11"	185	RS Senior	Mount Vernon, NY	Graduated
Trey Davis	12	G	6'0"	185	Senior	DeSoto, TX	Graduated
Tyler Bergantino	22	C	6'9"	250	Senior	Spring Hill, FL	Graduated

=== 2016 recruiting class ===
College recruiting information
Name	Hometown	School	Height	Weight	Commit date
DeJon Jarreau #15 SG	New Orleans, LA	McDonogh 35 High School	6 ft 5 in (1.96 m)	170 lb (77 kg)	Sep 28, 2015
DeJon Jarreau #15 SG	Recruit ratings: Scout: Rivals: (84)				
Chris Baldwin #32 PF	Springfield, MA	Notre Dame Prep	6 ft 8 in (2.03 m)	230 lb (100 kg)	Sep 29, 2015
Chris Baldwin #32 PF	Recruit ratings: Scout: Rivals: (80)				
Brison Gresham #29 C	New Orleans, LA	McDonogh 35 High School	6 ft 9 in (2.06 m)	210 lb (95 kg)	Sep 28, 2015
Brison Gresham #29 C	Recruit ratings: Scout: Rivals: (78)				
Unique McLean #53 SG	Granby, MA	The MacDuffie School	6 ft 1 in (1.85 m)	170 lb (77 kg)	Jun 8, 2015
Unique McLean #53 SG	Recruit ratings: Scout: Rivals: (75)				
Tyrn Flowers #47 SF	Waterbury, CT	Sacred Heart High School	6 ft 8 in (2.03 m)	205 lb (93 kg)	Jan 11, 2016
Tyrn Flowers #47 SF	Recruit ratings: Scout: Rivals: (75)				
Overall recruit ranking:
Note: In many cases, Scout, Rivals, 247Sports, On3, and ESPN may conflict in their listings of height and weight.; In these cases, the average was taken. ESPN grades are on a 100-point scale.; Sources: "2016 Team Ranking". Rivals.

== Preseason ==
UMass was picked to finish 10th in the Preseason A-10 poll. Donte Clark was named to the Preseason All-Conference Third Team.

== Roster ==
2016–17 UMass Minutemen men's basketball team
Players
Coaches

Pos.	#	Name	Height	Weight	Year	Previous school	Hometown
G	0	Donte Clark	6 ft 4 in (1.93 m)	188 lb (85 kg)	Jr	Queen’s Grant HS	Chatham, VA
G	1	Zach Lewis	6 ft 3 in (1.91 m)	182 lb (83 kg)	RS Jr	NW Catholic HS; Canisius	Windsor, CT
G	2	Luwane Pipkins	5 ft 10 in (1.78 m)	165 lb (75 kg)	So	Bogan HS	Chicago, IL
G	3	DeJon Jarreau	6 ft 5 in (1.96 m)	180 lb (82 kg)	Fr	McDonogh 35 HS	New Orleans, LA
G	4	Unique McLean	6 ft 2 in (1.88 m)	175 lb (79 kg)	Fr	MacDuffie School	Brooklyn, NY
F	5	Chris Baldwin	6 ft 8 in (2.03 m)	235 lb (107 kg)	Fr	Notre Dame Prep	Springfield, MA
F	10	Malik Hines	6 ft 10 in (2.08 m)	240 lb (109 kg)	Fr	Murrah HS	Jackson, MS
G	11	Rayshawn Miller (W)	6 ft 1 in (1.85 m)	185 lb (84 kg)	So	Boston Latin Academy	Boston, MA
F	14	Zach Coleman	6 ft 7 in (2.01 m)	215 lb (98 kg)	RS Jr	Woodrow Wilson HS	Dallas, TX
G	23	C. J. Anderson	6 ft 6 in (1.98 m)	205 lb (93 kg)	Jr	Whitehaven HS	Memphis, TN
F	24	Tyrn Flowers	6 ft 8 in (2.03 m)	205 lb (93 kg)	Fr	Sacred Heart HS	Waterbury, CT
F	33	Seth Berger	6 ft 7 in (2.01 m)	214 lb (97 kg)	RS Jr	Ballard HS	Seattle, WA
F	34	Zach Turcotte (W)	6 ft 7 in (2.01 m)	214 lb (97 kg)	Sr	Masconomet Regional HS	Boxford, MA
C	45	Rashaan Holloway	6 ft 10 in (2.08 m)	335 lb (152 kg)	So	Schalick HS	Elmer, NJ
F/C	55	Brison Gresham	6 ft 9 in (2.06 m)	210 lb (95 kg)	Fr	McDonogh 35 HS	New Orleans, LA

Head coach

- Derek Kellogg (UMass)

Assistant coach(es)

- Adam Ginsburg (Buffalo)
- Shyrone Chatman (Memphis)
- Andy Allison (Youngstown State)

Legend

- (C) Team captain
- (S) Suspended
- (I) Ineligible
- (W) Walk-on
- Injured
- Current redshirt

Roster

== Schedule and results ==
Date time, TV	Rank^{#}	Opponent^{#}	Result	Record	Site (attendance) city, state
Non-conference regular season
11/11/2016*; 4:00 pm		UMass Lowell	W 90–76	1–0	Mullins Center (5,229); Amherst, MA
11/14/2016*; 8:00 pm, SECN		at Ole Miss	L 88–90	1–1	The Pavilion at Ole Miss (5,291); Oxford, MS
11/17/2016*; 7:00 pm, ASN		Temple	W 70–67	2–1	Mullins Center (3,732); Amherst, MA
11/20/2016*; 1:05 pm		at Holy Cross	W 68–60	3–1	DCU Center (3,591); Worcester, MA
11/26/2016*; 1:00 pm		Harvard	W 70–66	4–1	Mullins Center (3,320); Amherst, MA
11/30/2016*; 7:00 pm		Wagner	W 62–55	5–1	Mullins Center (2,896); Amherst, MA
12/03/2016*; 1:00 pm		Central Florida	L 62–65	5–2	Mullins Center (3,911); Amherst, MA
12/08/2016*; 7:00 pm		Pacific; Gotham Classic	W 72–48	6–2	Mullins Center (3,171); Amherst, MA
12/10/2016*; 12:00 pm, FS1		at Providence	L 69–75	6–3	Dunkin' Donuts Center (7,815); Providence, RI
12/13/2016*; 7:00 pm		North Carolina A&T; Gotham Classic	W 65–59	7–3	Mullins Center (3,239); Amherst, MA
12/17/2016*; 1:00 pm		Kennesaw State; Gotham Classic	W 95–77	8–3	Mullins Center (1,758); Amherst, MA
12/22/2016*; 7:00 pm		Rider; Gotham Classic	W 78–67	9–3	Mullins Center (2,547); Amherst, MA
12/28/2016*; 2:00 pm		at Georgia State	L 65–74	10–3	GSU Sports Arena (1,639); Atlanta, GA
Atlantic 10 regular season
12/30/2016; 4:00 pm		St. Bonaventure	L 77–89	10–4 (0–1)	Mullins Center (4,877); Amherst, MA
01/04/2017; 7:00 pm		at George Mason	L 81–86	10–5 (0–2)	EagleBank Arena (2,755); Fairfax, VA
01/07/2017; 1:00 pm, NBCSN		at VCU	L 64–81	10–6 (0–3)	Siegel Center (7,637); Richmond, VA
01/11/2017; 7:00 pm, CBSSN		Dayton	W 67–55	11–6 (1–3)	Mullins Center (2,628); Amherst, MA
01/15/2017; 2:30 pm, NBCSN		at Rhode Island	L 77–79	11–7 (1–4)	Ryan Center (6,202); Kingston, RI
01/18/2017; 7:00 pm, ASN		Saint Joseph's	W 62–57	12–7 (2–4)	Mullins Center (2,370); Amherst, MA
01/21/2017; 12:30 pm, NBCSN		Fordham	L 68–71	12–8 (2–5)	Mullins Center (3,423); Amherst, MA
01/25/2017; 7:00 pm		at Saint Louis	L 70–74	12–9 (2–6)	Chaifetz Arena (6,265); St. Louis, MO
01/28/2017; 1:00 pm		George Mason	L 74–76	12–10 (2–7)	Mullins Center (4,261); Amherst, MA
02/01/2017; 7:00 pm		at La Salle	L 78–88	12–11 (2–8)	Tom Gola Arena (1,361); Philadelphia, PA
02/07/2017; 7:00 pm, CBSSN		Rhode Island	L 62–70	12–12 (2–9)	Mullins Center (3,512); Amherst, MA
02/11/2017; 2:30 pm, NBCSN		at Saint Joseph's	W 87–76	13–12 (3–9)	Hagan Arena (4,200); Philadelphia, PA
02/15/2017; 7:00 pm		at Duquesne	L 66–96	13–13 (3–10)	Palumbo Center (1,185); Pittsburgh, PA
02/18/2017; 12:00 pm, NBCSN		Davidson	L 74–79	13–14 (3–11)	Mullins Center (3,219); Amherst, MA
02/23/2017; 7:00 pm, ASN		at George Washington	L 67-83	13-15 (3-12)	Charles E. Smith Center (2,654); Washington, D.C.
02/26/2017; 1:00 pm, ASN		La Salle	W 84–71	14–15 (4–12)	Mullins Center (2,811); Amherst, MA
03/01/2017; 7:00 pm		Richmond	L 64–75	14–16 (4–13)	Mullins Center (2,434); Amherst, MA
03/04/2017; 4:00 pm, ASN		at St. Bonaventure	L 56–60	14–17 (4–14)	Reilly Center (4,322); Olean, NY
Atlantic 10 tournament
03/08/2017; 6:00 pm, ASN	(12)	vs. (13) Saint Joseph's; First round	W 70–63	15–17	PPG Paints Arena (5,517); Pittsburgh, PA
03/09/2017; 2:30 pm, NBCSN	(12)	vs. (5) St. Bonaventure; Second round	L 60–73	15–18	PPG Paints Arena (7,509); Pittsburgh, PA
*Non-conference game. ^{#}Rankings from AP Poll / Coaches' Poll. (#) Tournament seedings in parentheses. All times are in Eastern.

== See also ==
- 2016–17 UMass Minutewomen basketball team
