= 2016–17 La Salle Explorers men's basketball team =

American college basketball season

2016–17 La Salle Explorers men's basketball
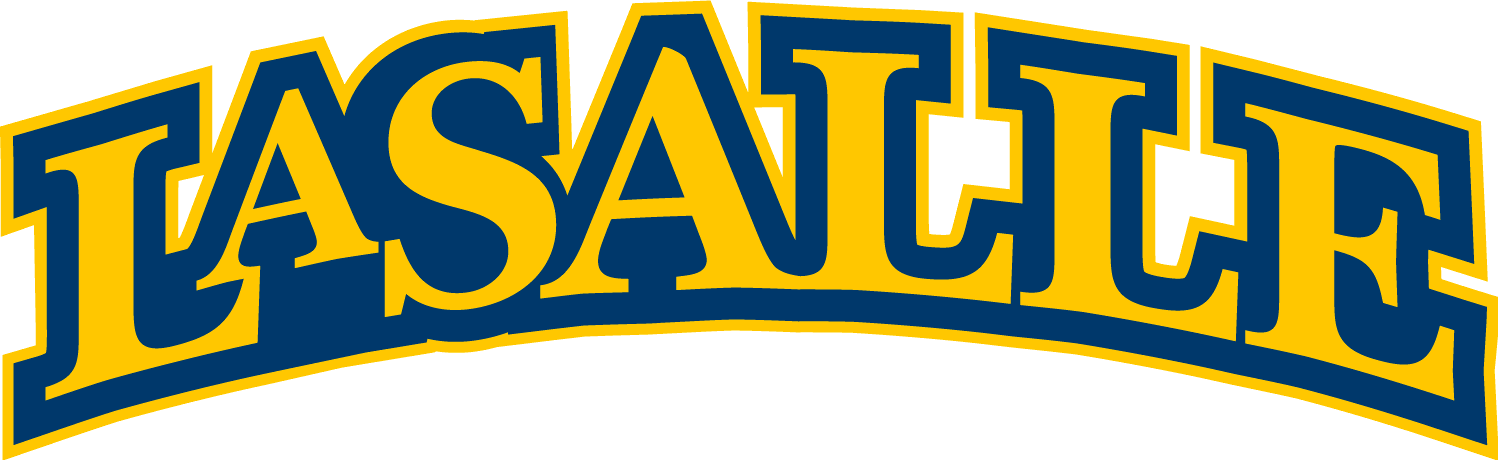
- Conference: Atlantic 10 Conference
- Record: 15–15 (9–9 A-10)
- Head coach: John Giannini (13th season)
- Assistant coaches: Horace Owens; Matt Brady; Sean Neal
- Home arena: Tom Gola Arena

2016–17 Atlantic 10 men's basketball standings
	Conf.				Overall
Team	W		L	PCT	W		L	PCT
Dayton	15	–	3	.833	24	–	8	.750
VCU	14	–	4	.778	26	–	9	.743
Rhode Island †	13	–	5	.722	25	–	10	.714
Richmond	13	–	5	.722	22	–	13	.629
Saint Bonaventure	11	–	7	.611	20	–	12	.625
George Washington	10	–	8	.556	20	–	15	.571
George Mason	9	–	9	.500	20	–	14	.588
La Salle	9	–	9	.500	15	–	15	.500
Davidson	8	–	10	.444	17	–	15	.531
Fordham	7	–	11	.389	13	–	19	.406
Saint Louis	6	–	12	.333	12	–	21	.364
UMass	4	–	14	.222	15	–	18	.455
Saint Joseph's	4	–	14	.222	11	–	20	.355
Duquesne	3	–	15	.167	10	–	22	.313
† 2017 A10 Tournament winner

The 2016–17 La Salle Explorers basketball team represented La Salle University during the 2016–17 NCAA Division I men's basketball season. The Explorers, led by 13th-year head coach John Giannini, played their home games at Tom Gola Arena in Philadelphia, Pennsylvania as members of the Atlantic 10 Conference. They finished the season 15–15, 9–9 in A-10 play to finish in a tie for seventh place. As the No. 8 seed in the A-10 tournament, they lost to Davidson in the first round.

== Previous season ==
The Explorers finished the 2015–16 season 9–22, 4–14 in A-10 play to finish in last place. They defeated Duquesne in the first round of the A-10 tournament to advance to the second round where they lost to Davidson.

== Offseason ==
=== Departures ===
Name	Number	Pos.	Height	Weight	Year	Hometown	Notes
O. J. Lewis	11	G	6'0"	180	Senior	Mitchellville, MD	Walk-on; graduated
Karl Harris	14	G	6'5"	170	Freshman	Hazel Crest, IL	Transferred to Indian Hills CC
Dusan Majstorovic	23	G	6'5"	195	Freshman	Novi Sad, Serbia	Transferred to Maine
Rohan Brown	35	G/F	6'6"	215	Senior	Hartford, CT	Graduated

=== 2016 recruiting class ===
College recruiting information
Name	Hometown	School	Height	Weight	Commit date
Saul Phiri #56 SF	Bradford, MA	Worcester Academy	6 ft 4 in (1.93 m)	210 lb (95 kg)	Feb 12, 2016
Saul Phiri #56 SF	Recruit ratings: Scout: Rivals: (73)				
Cian Sullivan; C	Barrington, RI	St. Andrew's School	7 ft 1 in (2.16 m)	210 lb (95 kg)	Nov 6, 2015
Cian Sullivan; C	Recruit ratings: Scout: Rivals: (55)				
Isiah Deas; G	Brooklyn, NY	Coastal Academy (NJ)	6 ft 6 in (1.98 m)	170 lb (77 kg)	Jun 28, 2016
Isiah Deas; G	Recruit ratings: Scout: Rivals: (N/A)				
Overall recruit ranking:
Note: In many cases, Scout, Rivals, 247Sports, On3, and ESPN may conflict in their listings of height and weight.; In these cases, the average was taken. ESPN grades are on a 100-point scale.; Sources: "2016 Team Ranking". Rivals.

== Preseason ==
La Salle was picked to finish in seventh place in the Preseason A-10 poll. Jordan Price was named to the Preseason All-Conference Second Team.

== Roster ==
2016–17 La Salle Explorers men's basketball team
Players
Coaches

Pos.	#	Name	Height	Weight	Year	Previous school	Hometown
G	0	Pookie Powell	6 ft 0 in (1.83 m)	185 lb (84 kg)	RS So	Memphis	Orlando, Florida
G	1	Johnnie Shuler	5 ft 11 in (1.8 m)	175 lb (79 kg)	Jr	Roosevelt Senior High School	Washington, D.C.
G	2	Amar Stukes	6 ft 2 in (1.88 m)	195 lb (88 kg)	RS Jr	La Salle College High School	Philadelphia, Pennsylvania
G	3	Cleon Roberts	6 ft 6 in (1.98 m)	190 lb (86 kg)	RS Sr	Georgia Southern	Miami, Florida
G	4	Hank Davis (W)	5 ft 11 in (1.8 m)	170 lb (77 kg)	Sr	Cherry Hill High School East	Cherry Hill, New Jersey
C	5	Tony Washington	6 ft 10 in (2.08 m)	230 lb (104 kg)	RS Jr	The Miller School of Albemarle	Detroit, Michigan
G	10	Isiah Deas	6 ft 6 in (1.98 m)	170 lb (77 kg)	Fr	Coastal Academy (NJ)	Brooklyn, New York
F	12	Yevgen Sakhniuk	6 ft 7 in (2.01 m)	235 lb (107 kg)	Jr	GBA Sparta	Kyiv, Ukraine
G	13	Saul Phiri	6 ft 4 in (1.93 m)	210 lb (95 kg)	Fr	Putnam Science Academy (CT)	Haverhill, Massachusetts
G/F	20	B. J. Johnson	6 ft 7 in (2.01 m)	200 lb (91 kg)	RS Jr	Syracuse	Philadelphia, Pennsylvania
G	21	Jordan Price	6 ft 5 in (1.96 m)	220 lb (100 kg)	RS Sr	Auburn	Decatur, Georgia
F/C	24	Demetrius Henry	6 ft 9 in (2.06 m)	225 lb (102 kg)	RS Jr	South Carolina	Fort Lauderdale, Florida
C	31	Cian Sullivan	7 ft 2 in (2.18 m)	215 lb (98 kg)	Fr	St. Andrews Prep (RI)	Tralee, Ireland

Head coach

- John Giannini (North Central (IL))

Assistant coach(es)

- Horace Owens (Rhode Island)
- Matt Brady (Siena)
- Sean Neal (La Salle)

Legend

- (C) Team captain
- (S) Suspended
- (I) Ineligible
- (W) Walk-on
- Injured
- Current redshirt

Roster

== Schedule and results ==
Date time, TV	Rank^{#}	Opponent^{#}	Result	Record	Site (attendance) city, state
Exhibition
11/05/2016*; 2:00 pm		Carleton	W 79–73		Tom Gola Arena; Philadelphia, PA
Regular season
11/11/2016*; 7:00 pm, ESPNews		at Temple; Philadelphia Big 5	L 92–97 ^{OT}	0-1	Liacouras Center (7,768); Philadelphia, PA
11/16/2016*; 7:00 pm		Delaware	W 74–68	1–1	Tom Gola Arena (1,888); Philadelphia, PA
11/19/2016*; 3:00 pm		Texas Southern; Homecoming	L 76–77	1–2	Tom Gola Arena (2,622); Philadelphia, PA
11/27/2016*; 4:00 pm		at Drexel	W 89–78	2–2	Daskalakis Athletic Center (931); Philadelphia, PA
11/30/2016*; 7:00 pm		Lehigh	W 89–81	3–2	Tom Gola Arena (1,695); Philadelphia, PA
12/03/2016*; 2:00 pm		Bucknell	W 83–73	4–2	Tom Gola Arena (1,732); Philadelphia, PA
12/06/2016*; 7:00 pm, ESPN2		vs. No. 1 Villanova; Philadelphia Big 5	L 79–89	4–3	Palestra (7,120); Philadelphia, PA
12/10/2016*; 2:10 pm, ESPN2		vs. Georgetown; HoopHall Miami Invitational	L 78–93	4–4	American Airlines Arena (2,152); Miami, FL
12/17/2016*; 2:00 pm		Florida Gulf Coast	W 84–80	5–4	Tom Gola Arena (1,220); Philadelphia, PA
12/22/2016*; 7:00 pm		at Mercer	W 98–96 ^{3OT}	6–4	Hawkins Arena (3,272); Macon, GA
12/30/2016; 6:00 pm, CBSSN		at Dayton	L 55–66	6–5 (0–1)	UD Arena (12,963); Dayton, OH
01/04/2017; 7:00 pm		Saint Louis	W 75–54	7–5 (1–1)	Tom Gola Arena (1,303); Philadelphia, PA
01/07/2017; 8:00 pm, ASN		Duquesne	W 88–81	8–5 (2–1)	Tom Gola Arena (1,258); Philadelphia, PA
01/12/2017; 7:00 pm, CBSSN		at Rhode Island	W 87–75	9–5 (3–1)	Ryan Center (3,753); Kingston, RI
01/15/2017; 4:30 pm, NBCSN		George Washington	W 79–69	10–5 (4–1)	Tom Gola Arena (2,763); Philadelphia, PA
01/19/2017; 7:00 pm, CBSSN		Davidson	W 91–83	11–5 (5–1)	Tom Gola Arena (1,852); Philadelphia, PA
01/22/2017; 2:00 pm, NBCSN		at VCU	L 52–90	11–6 (5–2)	Siegel Center (7,637); Richmond, VA
01/25/2017*; 7:00 pm		Penn; Philadelphia Big 5	L 74–77	11–7	Tom Gola Arena (1,984); Philadelphia, PA
01/28/2017; 6:00 pm, ASN		at Saint Joseph's; Philadelphia Big 5	W 73–72	11–8 (5–3)	Hagan Arena (4,200); Philadelphia, PA
02/01/2017; 7:00 pm		Massachusetts	W 88–78	12–8 (6–3)	Tom Gola Arena (1,361); Philadelphia, PA
02/04/2017; 7:00 pm		at George Mason	L 75–95	12–9 (6–4)	EagleBank Arena (5,003); Fairfax, VA
02/08/2017; 7:00 pm		at Fordham	W 67–52	13–9 (7–4)	Rose Hill Gymnasium (2,156); Bronx, NY
02/11/2017; 2:00 pm		Richmond	L 52–64	13–10 (7–5)	Tom Gola Arena (3,400); Philadelphia, PA
02/15/2017; 7:00 pm		at St. Bonaventure	L 65–83	13–11 (7–6)	Reilly Center (3,512); Olean, NY
02/18/2017; 4:00 pm, CBSSN		Saint Joseph's	W 83–68	14–11 (8–6)	Tom Gola Arena (3,400); Philadelphia, PA
02/21/2017; 6:00 pm, CBSSN		Rhode Island	L 56–67	14–12 (8–7)	Tom Gola Arena (1,522); Philadelphia, PA
02/26/2017; 1:00 pm, ASN		at Massachusetts	L 71–84	14–13 (8–8)	Mullins Center (2,811); Amherst, MA
03/01/2017; 8:00 pm		at Saint Louis	L 55–70	14–14 (8–9)	Chaifetz Arena (5,932); St. Louis, MO
03/04/2017; 7:00 pm		Fordham	W 66–54	15–14 (9–9)	Tom Gola Arena (1,412); Philadelphia, PA
Atlantic 10 tournament
03/09/2017; 12:00 pm, NBCSN	(8)	vs. (9) Davidson; Second round	W 82–73	15–15	PPG Paints Arena (7,509); Pittsburgh, PA
*Non-conference game. ^{#}Rankings from AP Poll. (#) Tournament seedings in parentheses. All times are in Eastern Time.
