= 2016–17 St. Bonaventure Bonnies men's basketball team =

American college basketball season

2016–17 St. Bonaventure Bonnies men's basketball
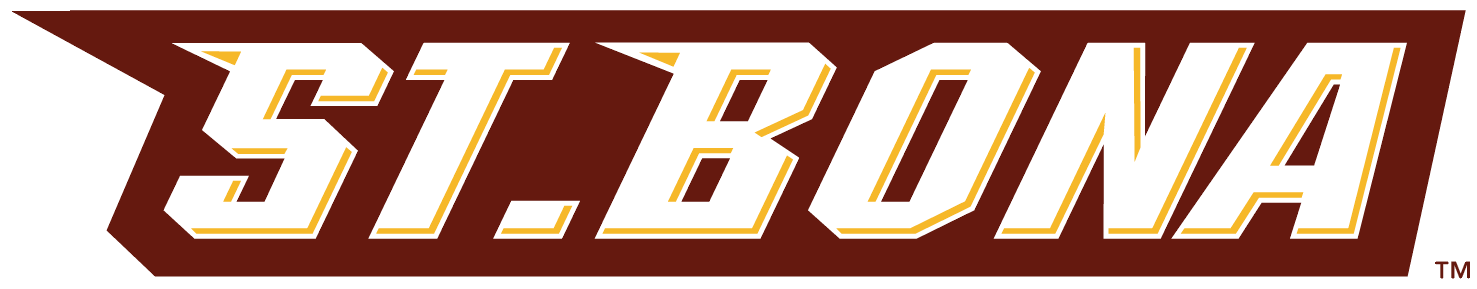
- Conference: Atlantic 10 Conference
- Record: 20–12 (11–7 A-10)
- Head coach: Mark Schmidt (10th season)
- Assistant coaches: Dave Moore; Steve Curran; Jerome Robinson
- Home arena: Reilly Center

2016–17 Atlantic 10 men's basketball standings
	Conf.				Overall
Team	W		L	PCT	W		L	PCT
Dayton	15	–	3	.833	24	–	8	.750
VCU	14	–	4	.778	26	–	9	.743
Rhode Island †	13	–	5	.722	25	–	10	.714
Richmond	13	–	5	.722	22	–	13	.629
Saint Bonaventure	11	–	7	.611	20	–	12	.625
George Washington	10	–	8	.556	20	–	15	.571
George Mason	9	–	9	.500	20	–	14	.588
La Salle	9	–	9	.500	15	–	15	.500
Davidson	8	–	10	.444	17	–	15	.531
Fordham	7	–	11	.389	13	–	19	.406
Saint Louis	6	–	12	.333	12	–	21	.364
UMass	4	–	14	.222	15	–	18	.455
Saint Joseph's	4	–	14	.222	11	–	20	.355
Duquesne	3	–	15	.167	10	–	22	.313
† 2017 A10 Tournament winner

The 2016–17 St. Bonaventure Bonnies men's basketball team represented St. Bonaventure University during the 2016–17 NCAA Division I men's basketball season. The Bonnies, led by tenth-year head coach Mark Schmidt, played their home games at the Reilly Center in Olean, New York as members of the Atlantic 10 Conference. They finished the regular season 20–12, 11–7 in A-10 play to finish in fifth place. They received the No. 5 seed in the A-10 tournament where they defeated UMass in the second round to advance to the quarterfinals where they lost to Rhode Island.

== Previous season ==
The Bonnies finished the 2015–16 season 22–9, 14–4 in A-10 play to finish in a three-way tie for the regular season championship. They lost in the quarterfinals of the A-10 tournament to Davidson. While the two other teams who tied with Saint Bonaventure for the A-10 title received at-large bids to the NCAA tournament, the Bonnies were one of the "First Four Out" and instead received a top seed in the National Invitation Tournament where they lost in the first round to Wagner.

== Offseason ==
=== Departures ===
Name	Number	Pos.	Height	Weight	Year	Hometown	Notes
Marcus Posley	3	G	6'1"	200	Senior	Rockford, IL	Graduated
Derrick Woods	20	F	6'8"	215	Freshman	Trenton, NJ	Transferred to Delaware
Dion Wright	21	F	6'7"	220	Senior	Lakewood, CA	Graduated
Jordan Tyson	45	F	6'10"	225	RS Freshman	Cincinnati, OH	Transferred to Georgia State

=== Incoming transfers ===
Name	Number	Pos.	Height	Weight	Year	Hometown	Previous School
Chinoso Obokoh	5	C	6'9"	215	Senior	Rochester, NY	Transferred from Syracuse. Will eligible to play, since Obokoh graduated from Syracuse.
Quinn Lee Yaw	21	F	6'6"	215	Junior	Jamestown, NY	Transferred from Edinboro. Under NCAA transfer rules, Lee Yaw will have to sit out for the 2016–17 season. Will have two years of remaining eligibility. Will join the team as a preferred walk-on.

=== 2016 recruiting class ===
College recruiting information
Name	Hometown	School	Height	Weight	Commit date
Tareq Coburn #79 SF	Rosedale, NY	Benjamin Cardozo High School	6 ft 4 in (1.93 m)	180 lb (82 kg)	Mar 30, 2016
Tareq Coburn #79 SF	Recruit ratings: Scout: Rivals: (66)				
Amadi Ikpeze #62 C	Amherst, NY	Amherst Central High School	6 ft 10 in (2.08 m)	245 lb (111 kg)	Nov 8, 2015
Amadi Ikpeze #62 C	Recruit ratings: Scout: Rivals: (65)				
Joshua Ayeni #66 C	Fort Washington, MD	Impact Basketball Academy	6 ft 7 in (2.01 m)	220 lb (100 kg)	
Joshua Ayeni #66 C	Recruit ratings: Scout: Rivals: (64)				
Overall recruit ranking:
Note: In many cases, Scout, Rivals, 247Sports, On3, and ESPN may conflict in their listings of height and weight.; In these cases, the average was taken. ESPN grades are on a 100-point scale.; Sources: "2016 Team Ranking". Rivals.

== Preseason ==
The Bonnies were picked to finish fifth in the A-10 preseason poll. Jaylen Adams was selected the Preseason All-Conference First Team.

== Roster ==
2016–17 St. Bonaventure Bonnies men's basketball team
Players
Coaches

Pos.	#	Name	Height	Weight	Year	Previous school	Hometown
F	0	David Andoh	6 ft 7 in (2.01 m)	230 lb (104 kg)	RS Sr	Liberty	Montreal, Quebec
G	1	Idris Taqqee	6 ft 4 in (1.93 m)	200 lb (91 kg)	Jr	Cushing Academy	Snellville, Georgia
G	2	Matt Mobley	6 ft 3 in (1.91 m)	185 lb (84 kg)	RS Jr	Central Connecticut State	Worcester, Massachusetts
G	3	Tareq Coburn	6 ft 5 in (1.96 m)	200 lb (91 kg)	Fr	Benjamin N. Cardozo High School	Rosedale, New York
G	4	Nelson Kaputo	6 ft 0 in (1.83 m)	175 lb (79 kg)	So	St. Michael's College School	Toronto, Ontario
F/C	5	Chinonso Obokoh	6 ft 9 in (2.06 m)	225 lb (102 kg)	GS	Syracuse	Enugu, Nigeria
G	10	Jaylen Adams	6 ft 2 in (1.88 m)	185 lb (84 kg)	Jr	Mount Saint Joseph High School	Baltimore, Maryland
G/F	11	Courtney Stockard	6 ft 5 in (1.96 m)	205 lb (93 kg)	RS Jr	Allen Community College	St. Louis, Missouri
F	12	Denzel Gregg	6 ft 7 in (2.01 m)	225 lb (102 kg)	Sr	St. Thomas More (CT)	Syracuse, New York
F	15	LaDarien Griffin	6 ft 6 in (1.98 m)	210 lb (95 kg)	So	Providence School	Jacksonville, Florida
F	21	Quinn Lee Yaw (W, I) (redshirt)	6 ft 5 in (1.96 m)	215 lb (98 kg)	Jr	Edinboro	Jamestown, New York
G	23	Jack Galatio	5 ft 10 in (1.78 m)	165 lb (75 kg)	Fr	Hornell High School	Hornell, New York
G	24	Caleb McGuire (W)	6 ft 4 in (1.93 m)	190 lb (86 kg)	Sr	West Genesee High School	Belmont, New York
F/C	32	Amadi Ikpeze	6 ft 10 in (2.08 m)	250 lb (113 kg)	Fr	Amherst Central High School	Buffalo, New York
F	33	Josh Ayeni	6 ft 8 in (2.03 m)	220 lb (100 kg)	Fr	Impact Academy (FL)	Zaria, Nigeria

Head coach

- Mark Schmidt (Boston College)

Assistant coach(es)

- Dave Moore(Bethel (TN))
- Steve Curran (Merrimack)
- Jerome Robinson (Bradley)

Legend

- (C) Team captain
- (S) Suspended
- (I) Ineligible
- (W) Walk-on
- Injured
- Current redshirt

Roster

== Schedule and results ==
Date time, TV	Rank^{#}	Opponent^{#}	Result	Record	Site (attendance) city, state
Exhibition
11/05/2016*; 4:00 pm		Alfred	W 99–72		Reilly Center (3,581); Olean, NY
Non-conference regular season
11/12/2016*; 4:00 pm		Saint Francis (PA)	W 92–82	1–0	Reilly Center (4,322); Olean, NY
11/17/2016*; 7:00 pm		vs. Florida; Lakeland Showcase	L 66–73	1–1	Lakeland Center (4,133); Lakeland, FL
11/21/2016*; 6:00 pm		vs. Little Rock; Lone Star Showcase	L 65–68	1–2	H-E-B Center at Cedar Park; Cedar Park, TX
11/22/2016*; 6:00 pm		vs. Central Michigan; Lone Star Showcase	W 102–71	2–2	H-E-B Center at Cedar Park; Cedar Park, TX
11/23/2016*; 6:00 pm		vs. Pepperdine; Lone Star Showcase	W 89–63	3–2	H-E-B Center at Cedar Park; Cedar Park, TX
11/30/2016*; 8:00 pm, SPCSN		Siena; Franciscan Cup	W 81–74	4–2	Reilly Center (3,859); Olean, NY
12/03/2016*; 4:00 pm, SPCSN		Buffalo	W 90–84	5–2	Reilly Center (5,012); Olean, NY
12/06/2016*; 7:00 pm		at Hofstra	W 81–75	6–2	Mack Sports Complex (2,112); Hempstead, NY
12/10/2016*; 7:00 pm, ASN		UNC Wilmington	L 80–81	6–3	Reilly Center (3,976); Olean, NY
12/17/2016*; 1:00 pm		vs. Niagara; Big 4 Classic	W 79–69	7–3	KeyBank Center; Buffalo, NY
12/19/2016*; 7:00 pm, SPCSN		Army	W 92–83	8–3	Reilly Center (3,254); Olean, NY
12/22/2016*; 7:00 pm, SPCSN		Canisius	L 101–106 ^{OT}	8–4	Reilly Center (3,433); Olean, NY
Atlantic 10 regular season
12/30/2016; 4:00 pm		at Massachusetts	W 89–77	9–4 (1–0)	Mullins Center (4,877); Amherst, MA
01/03/2017; 8:00 pm, ASN		Dayton	L 74–90	9–5 (1–1)	Reilly Center (3,328); Olean, NY
01/07/2017; 5:00 pm, NBCSN		George Mason	W 82–72	10–5 (2–1)	Reilly Center (4,026); Olean, NY
01/11/2017; 7:00 pm		at Richmond	L 61–78	10–6 (2–2)	Robins Center (6,058); Richmond, VA
01/14/2017; 4:30 pm, NBCSN		vs. Fordham; Lightower Conference Classic	W 73–53	11–6 (3–2)	Blue Cross Arena (6,386); Rochester, NY
01/17/2017; 9:00 pm, ASN		at Saint Louis	W 71–52	12–6 (4–2)	Chaifetz Arena (4,127); St. Louis, MO
01/24/2017; 7:00 pm, ASN		Saint Joseph's	W 67–63	13–6 (5–2)	Reilly Center (3,961); Olean, NY
01/28/2017; 4:00 pm, NBCSN		at Rhode Island	L 59–71	13–7 (5–3)	Ryan Center (6,757); Kingston, RI
02/01/2017; 8:00 pm, ASN		at Duquesne	W 71–64	14–7 (6–3)	Palumbo Center (975); Pittsburgh, PA
02/04/2017; 4:00 pm, CBSSN		VCU	L 77–83 ^{OT}	14–8 (6–4)	Reilly Center (5,480); Olean, NY
02/08/2017; 7:00 pm, SPCSN		Saint Louis	W 70–55	15–8 (7–4)	Reilly Center (3,763); Olean, NY
02/11/2017; 4:30 pm, NBCSN		at George Washington	L 70–76	15–9 (7–5)	Charles E. Smith Center (3,875); Washington, D.C.
02/15/2017; 7:00 pm, SPCSN		La Salle	W 83–65	16–9 (8–5)	Reilly Center (3,512); Olean, NY
02/18/2017; 2:00 pm, NBCSN		at Dayton	L 72–76	16–10 (8–6)	UD Arena (13,455); Dayton, OH
02/22/2017; 7:00 pm		at Saint Joseph's	W 83–77	17–10 (9–6)	Hagan Arena (3,743); Philadelphia, PA
02/25/2017; 4:00 pm, ASN		Duquesne	W 80–77	18–10 (10–6)	Reilly Center (5,480); Olean, NY
02/28/2017; 7:00 pm, ASN		at Davidson	L 63–68	18–11 (10–7)	John M. Belk Arena (3,570); Davidson, NC
03/04/2017; 4:00 pm, ASN		Massachusetts	W 60–56	19–11 (11–7)	Reilly Center (4,322); Olean, NY
Atlantic 10 tournament
03/09/2017; 2:30 pm, NBCSN	(5)	vs. (12) Massachusetts; Second round	W 73–60	20–11	PPG Paints Arena (7,509); Pittsburgh, PA
03/10/2017; 2:30 pm, NBCSN	(5)	vs. (4) Rhode Island; Quarterfinals	L 63–74	20–12	PPG Paints Arena (6,641); Pittsburgh, PA
*Non-conference game. ^{#}Rankings from AP Poll/Coaches' Poll. (#) Tournament seedings in parentheses. All times are in Eastern Time.

== See also ==
- 2016–17 St. Bonaventure Bonnies women's basketball team
