= 2016–17 George Mason Patriots men's basketball team =

American college basketball season

2016–17 George Mason Patriots men's basketball

CBI, First round
- Conference: Atlantic 10 Conference
- Record: 20–14 (9–9 A-10)
- Head coach: Dave Paulsen (2nd season)
- Assistant coaches: Dane Fischer; Aaron Kelly; Duane Simpkins
- Home arena: EagleBank Arena

2016–17 Atlantic 10 men's basketball standings
	Conf.				Overall
Team	W		L	PCT	W		L	PCT
Dayton	15	–	3	.833	24	–	8	.750
VCU	14	–	4	.778	26	–	9	.743
Rhode Island †	13	–	5	.722	25	–	10	.714
Richmond	13	–	5	.722	22	–	13	.629
Saint Bonaventure	11	–	7	.611	20	–	12	.625
George Washington	10	–	8	.556	20	–	15	.571
George Mason	9	–	9	.500	20	–	14	.588
La Salle	9	–	9	.500	15	–	15	.500
Davidson	8	–	10	.444	17	–	15	.531
Fordham	7	–	11	.389	13	–	19	.406
Saint Louis	6	–	12	.333	12	–	21	.364
UMass	4	–	14	.222	15	–	18	.455
Saint Joseph's	4	–	14	.222	11	–	20	.355
Duquesne	3	–	15	.167	10	–	22	.313
† 2017 A10 Tournament winner

The 2016–17 George Mason Patriots Men's basketball team represented George Mason University during the 2016–17 NCAA Division I men's basketball season. This was the 51st season for the program. They were coached by second-year coach Dave Paulsen as members of the Atlantic 10 Conference. They play their home games at EagleBank Arena in Fairfax, Virginia. They finished the season 20–14, 9–9 in A-10 play to finish in a tie for seventh place. In the A-10 tournament, they defeated Fordham in the second round before losing to VCU in the quarterfinals. They received an invitation to the College Basketball Invitational where they lost in the first round to Loyola (MD).

== Previous season ==
The Patriots finished the 2015–16 season with a record of 11–21, 5–13 in A–10 play to finish in a tie for 12th place. In the A–10 Tournament, the Patriots were defeated by Saint Louis, 83–78 in the first round.

== Offseason ==
=== Departures ===
Name	Number	Pos.	Height	Weight	Year	Hometown	Notes
Marko Gujaničić	10	F	6'8"	236	Senior	Cacak, Serbia	Graduated
Julian Royal	25	F	6'8"	232	Senior	Alpharetta, GA	Graduated
Michael Rudy	30	F	6'7"	204	Senior	Falls Church, Virginia	Graduated
Shevon Thompson	14	C	6'11"	243	Senior	Clarendon Parish, Jamaica	Graduated

=== 2016 recruiting class ===
The following is a list of players signed for the 2017–18 season:

College recruiting information
Name	Hometown	School	Height	Weight	Commit date
Greg Calixte; F	Mount Vernon, NY	Mount Vernon High School	6 ft 8 in (2.03 m)	230 lb (100 kg)	Apr 12, 2017
Greg Calixte; F	Recruit ratings: Scout:				
Javon Greene; G	McDonough, GA	Henry County High School	6 ft 1 in (1.85 m)	155 lb (70 kg)	Aug 5, 2016
Javon Greene; G	Recruit ratings: No ratings found				
Goanar Mar; F	Plymouth, MN	DeLaSalle High School	6 ft 7 in (2.01 m)	200 lb (91 kg)	Apr 30, 2016
Goanar Mar; F	Recruit ratings: Scout: Rivals: (3)				
Overall recruit ranking:
Note: In many cases, Scout, Rivals, 247Sports, On3, and ESPN may conflict in their listings of height and weight.; In these cases, the average was taken. ESPN grades are on a 100-point scale.; Sources: "ESPN". ESPN.; "2017 Team Ranking". Rivals.

== Honors and awards ==
Atlantic 10 All-Conference 2nd Team

- Marquise Moore

Atlantic 10 Most Improved Player

- Marquise Moore

Atlantic 10 Player of the Week

- Marquise Moore - Dec. 12
- Marquise Moore - Dec. 26
- Marquise Moore - Jan. 23
- Otis Livingston II - Feb. 6

== Roster ==
2016–17 George Mason Patriots men's basketball team
Players
Coaches

Pos.	#	Name	Height	Weight	Year	Previous school	Hometown
F	1	DeAndre Abram	6 ft 7 in (2.01 m)	195 lb (88 kg)	So	Creekview High School	Carrollton, TX
G	2	Kameron Murrell	6 ft 2 in (1.88 m)	197 lb (89 kg)	So	IMG Academy	Long Beach, CA
G	3	Justin Kier	6 ft 4 in (1.93 m)	182 lb (83 kg)	Fr	Spotswood High School	Spottswood, VA
G	4	Otis Livingston II	5 ft 11 in (1.8 m)	168 lb (76 kg)	So	Linden High School	Linden, NJ
G	5	Jaire Grayer	6 ft 4 in (1.93 m)	192 lb (87 kg)	So	IMG Academy	Flint, MI
G	10	Karmari Newman	6 ft 4 in (1.93 m)	170 lb (77 kg)	Fr	East English Village Prep Academy	Detroit, MI
F	11	A. J. Wilson (redshirt)	6 ft 6 in (1.98 m)	—	Fr	Elev8 Prep Academy	Lanham, MD
G	12	Myles Tate (W)	5 ft 7 in (1.7 m)	161 lb (73 kg)	RS Sr	Mars Hill University	Ashburn, VA
F	14	Daniel Relvao	6 ft 9 in (2.06 m)	236 lb (107 kg)	RS Fr	Mountain Mission	Coimbra, Portugal
F	15	Danny Dixon	6 ft 10 in (2.08 m)	228 lb (103 kg)	So	IMG Academy	Grosse Pointe South, MI
G	22	Marquise Moore	6 ft 2 in (1.88 m)	208 lb (94 kg)	Sr	Saint Thomas More	Queens, NY
F	25	Troy Temara	6 ft 8 in (2.03 m)	225 lb (102 kg)	Fr	West Genesee High School	Syracuse, NY
F	31	Jalen Jenkins	6 ft 7 in (2.01 m)	246 lb (112 kg)	RS Sr	Cardinal Hayes	Brooklyn, NY
G	32	Ian Boyd	6 ft 3 in (1.91 m)	215 lb (98 kg)	Fr	Apex High School	Apex, NC

Head coach

- Dave Paulsen (Williams)

Assistant coach(es)

- Dane Fischer (Ithaca)
- Aaron Kelly (Catholic)
- Duane Simpkins (Maryland)

Legend

- (C) Team captain
- (S) Suspended
- (I) Ineligible
- (W) Walk-on
- Injured
- Current redshirt

Roster

== Player statistics ==
Player	GP	GS	MPG	FG%	3FG%	FT%	RPG	APG	SPG	BPG	PPG
Marquise Moore	34	34	34.9	.483	.303	.701	10.9	3.5	0.9	0.8	16.9
Otis Livingston II	34	34	34.6	.414	.336	.919	3.1	3.0	1.1	0.0	14.3
Jalen Jenkins	34	33	27.9	.608	.000	.679	6.1	1.9	0.4	0.3	12.0
Jaire Grayer	34	33	29.6	.421	.383	.833	5.4	0.6	0.7	1.0	11.4
Ian Boyd	31	4	19.0	.395	.263	.727	2.5	0.6	0.7	0.2	5.9
Justin Kier	33	29	27.4	.428	.386	.744	4.5	1.1	0.2	0.6	5.8
Karmari Newman	31	1	15.1	.343	.315	.810	1.3	0.5	0.1	0.0	4.6
DeAndre Abram	9	1	9.1	.462	.250	.714	3.4	2.0	0.1	0.3	3.4
Kameron Murrell	22	0	5.7	.324	.273	.750	0.7	0.3	0.3	0.0	1.6
Troy Temara	24	1	8.3	.390	.000	.400	1.3	0.2	0.0	0.0	1.6
Danny Dixon	6	0	4.5	.400	.000	.714	1.3	0.0	0.0	0.3	1.5
Daniel Relvao	27	0	7.0	.400	.000	.667	1.6	0.1	0.1	0.4	0.8
Myles Tate	7	0	3.5	.000	.000	.667	0.7	0.7	0.1	0.0	0.6

== Schedule and results ==
Date time, TV	Rank^{#}	Opponent^{#}	Result	Record	High points	High rebounds	High assists	Site (attendance) city, state
Non-conference regular season
November 12*; 7:00 pm, MASN		Towson	L 61–67	0–1	19 – Jenkins	7 – Jenkins	4 – Jenkins	EagleBank Arena (4,814); Fairfax, VA
November 15*; 7:00 pm		Lebanon Valley	W 90–65	1–1	19 – Moore	11 – Jenkins	6 – Livingston II	EagleBank Arena (2,638); Fairfax, VA
November 18*; 7:30 pm		Mount St. Mary's	L 76–78 ^{OT}	1–2	23 – Jenkins	13 – Moore	4 – Moore	EagleBank Arena (3,487); Fairfax, VA
November 21*; 7:30 pm		vs. Houston; Gulf Coast Showcase quarterfinals	L 56–93	1–3	15 – Moore	5 – Moore	3 – 3 tied	Germain Arena; Estero, FL
November 22*; 1:30 pm		vs. Kent State; Gulf Coast Showcase	W 79–75	2–3	23 – Moore	14 – Moore	5 – Livingston II, Moore	Germain Arena; Estero, FL
November 23*; 1:30 pm		vs. Bradley; Gulf Coast Showcase	W 77–66	3–3	22 – Livingston	15 – Moore	5 – Moore	Germain Arena; Estero, FL
November 26*; 6:00 pm, MASN		James Madison	W 80–77 ^{OT}	4–3	20 – Moore	8 – Moore	4 – Boyd	EagleBank Arena (4,192); Fairfax, VA
November 30*; 8:00 pm		at Northern Iowa	W 54–50	5–3	14 – Grayer	13 – Moore	5 – Moore	McLeod Center (4,302); Cedar Falls, IA
December 3*; 4:00 pm		Mercer	W 79–68	6–3	21 – Moore	12 – Moore	7 – Livingston II	EagleBank Arena (3,560); Fairfax, VA
December 7*; 7:00 pm, BTN		at Penn State	W 85–66	7–3	25 – Moore	13 – Moore	5 – Moore	Bryce Jordan Center (5,694); University Park, PA
December 10*; 2:00 pm, ESPN3		at Penn	W 79–60	8–3	22 – Jenkins	16 – Moore	10 – Moore	Palestra (2,273); Philadelphia, PA
December 12*; 7:00 pm		Longwood	W 97–60	9–3	17 – 3 players tied	8 – Jenkins, Moore	4 – Livingston II	EagleBank Arena (3,712); Fairfax, VA
December 22*; 12:00 pm		Prairie View A&M	W 75–59	10–3	23 – Livingston II	17 – Moore	6 – Livingston II	EagleBank Arena (5,584); Fairfax, VA
A-10 regular season
December 30; 8:00 pm, CBSSN		VCU; Rivalry	L 64–73	10–4 (0–1)	12 – Jenkins	6 – Moore	4 – Livingston II	EagleBank Arena (7,780); Fairfax, VA
January 4; 7:00 pm		Massachusetts	W 86–81	11–4 (1–1)	24 – Moore	7 – Moore	5 – Moore	EagleBank Arena (2,755); Fairfax, VA
January 7; 5:00 pm, NBCSN		at St. Bonaventure	L 72–82	11–5 (1–2)	19 – Moore	10 – Moore	4 – Moore	Reilly Center (4,026); Olean, NY
January 10; 7:00 pm, ASN		at Saint Joseph's	W 75–67	12–5 (2–2)	24 – Moore	10 – Moore	7 – Moore	Hagan Arena (3,051); Philadelphia, PA
January 14; 2:30 pm, NBCSN		Saint Louis	L 56–63	12–6 (2–3)	16 – Grayer	16 – Moore	5 – Moore	EagleBank Arena (3,651); Fairfax, VA
January 22; 1:00 pm, ASN		at Richmond	W 82–77	13–6 (3–3)	25 – Moore	13 – Moore	4 – Livingston II	Robins Center (7,201); Richmond, VA
January 25; 7:00 pm, ASN		George Washington	L 68–87	13–7 (3–4)	15 – Moore	10 – Moore	2 – Kier	EagleBank Arena (4,070); Fairfax, VA
January 28; 1:00 pm		at Massachusetts	W 76–74	14–7 (4–4)	22 – Livingston II	12 – Jenkins	5 – Moore	Mullins Center (4,261); Amherst, MA
February 1; 7:00 pm		at Saint Louis	L 74–76 ^{2OT}	14–8 (4–5)	29 – Livingston II	7 – Jenkins	7 – Jenkins	Chaifetz Arena (4,507); St. Louis, MO
February 4; 7:00 pm, MASN		La Salle	W 95–75	15–8 (5–5)	28 – Moore	9 – Moore	5 – Moore	EagleBank Arena (5,003); Fairfax, VA
February 8; 7:00 pm, ASN		at Davidson	W 76–69	16–8 (6–5)	23 – Jenkins	11 – Moore	4 – Moore	John M. Belk Arena (3,647); Davidson, NC
February 11; 6:00 pm, ASN		Fordham; Homecoming	W 73–67	17–8 (7–5)	19 – Livingston II	13 – Jenkins	6 – Moore	EagleBank Arena (6,676); Fairfax, VA
February 14; 7:00 pm, MASN		Richmond	W 93–70	18–8 (8–5)	22 – Moore	12 – Moore	4 – Moore	EagleBank Arena (3,004); Fairfax, VA
February 18; 4:00 pm, NBCSN		Rhode Island	L 74–77	18–9 (8–6)	22 – Jenkins	10 – Moore	4 – Livingston II	EagleBank Arena (6,145); Fairfax, VA
February 21; 7:00 pm		at Dayton	L 70–83	18–10 (8–7)	13 – Grayer	13 – Grayer	4 – Jenkins	UD Arena (13,071); Dayton, OH
February 26; 2:00 pm		at George Washington	L 74–83	18–11 (8–8)	20 – Moore	7 – Kier, Moore	6 – Moore	Charles E. Smith Center (3,352); Washington, D.C.
March 1; 7:00 pm		Duquesne	W 63–62	19–11 (9–8)	13 – Jenkins	13 – Moore	5 – Livingston II	EagleBank Arena (3,519); Fairfax, VA
March 4; 2:00 pm, MASN		at VCU; Rivalry	L 60–72	19–12 (9–9)	17 – Moore	11 – Moore	5 – Kier	Siegel Center (7,637); Richmond, VA
A-10 tournament
March 9; 6:00 pm, NBCSN	(7)	vs. (10) Fordham; Second Round	W 82–71 ^{OT}	20–12	25 – Moore	17 – Moore	5 – Moore	PPG Paints Arena (5,442); Pittsburgh, PA
March 10; 6:00 pm, NBCSN	(7)	vs. (2) VCU; Quarterfinals	L 60–71	20–13	15 – Jenkins	17 – Moore	2 – Jenkins, Livingston II	PPG Paints Arena (6,647); Pittsburgh, PA
CBI
March 15*; 7:00 pm		Loyola (MD); First round	L 58–73	20–14	19 – Livingston II	9 – Moore	3 – Moore	EagleBank Arena (1,400); Fairfax, VA
*Non-conference game. ^{#}Rankings from AP Poll. (#) Tournament seedings in parentheses. All times are in Eastern Time.

== See also ==
2016–17 George Mason Patriots women's basketball team
