= 2017 Atlantic 10 men's basketball tournament =

US collegiate tournament

- Classification: Division I
- Season: 2016–17
- Teams: 14
- Site: PPG Paints Arena; Pittsburgh, Pennsylvania
- Champions: Rhode Island (2nd title)
- Winning coach: Dan Hurley (1st title)
- MVP: E. C. Matthews (Rhode Island)
- Attendance: 45,667
- Television: ASN, NBCSN, CBSSN, CBS

2016–17 Atlantic 10 men's basketball standings
	Conf.				Overall
Team	W		L	PCT	W		L	PCT
Dayton	15	–	3	.833	24	–	8	.750
VCU	14	–	4	.778	26	–	9	.743
Rhode Island †	13	–	5	.722	25	–	10	.714
Richmond	13	–	5	.722	22	–	13	.629
Saint Bonaventure	11	–	7	.611	20	–	12	.625
George Washington	10	–	8	.556	20	–	15	.571
George Mason	9	–	9	.500	20	–	14	.588
La Salle	9	–	9	.500	15	–	15	.500
Davidson	8	–	10	.444	17	–	15	.531
Fordham	7	–	11	.389	13	–	19	.406
Saint Louis	6	–	12	.333	12	–	21	.364
UMass	4	–	14	.222	15	–	18	.455
Saint Joseph's	4	–	14	.222	11	–	20	.355
Duquesne	3	–	15	.167	10	–	22	.313
† 2017 A10 Tournament winner

The 2017 Atlantic 10 men's basketball tournament is the postseason men's basketball tournament for the Atlantic 10 Conference. It was held March 8–12, 2017 at PPG Paints Arena in Pittsburgh, Pennsylvania. The championship was won by Rhode Island who defeated VCU in the championship game. As a result, Rhode Island received the conference's automatic bid to the NCAA tournament.

== Seeds ==
All 14 A-10 schools participated in the tournament. Teams were seeded by record within the conference, with a tiebreaker system to seed teams with identical conference records. The top 10 teams received a first round bye and the top four teams received a double bye.

Seed	School	Conference	Tiebreaker
1	Dayton	15–3	
2	VCU	14–4	
3	Richmond	13–5	1–0 vs. Rhode Island
4	Rhode Island	13–5	0–1 vs. Richmond
5	St. Bonaventure	11–7	
6	George Washington	10–8	
7	George Mason	9–9	1–0 vs. La Salle
8	La Salle	9–9	0–1 vs. George Mason
9	Davidson	8–10	
10	Fordham	7–11	
11	Saint Louis	6–12	
12	Massachusetts	4–14	2–0 vs. Saint Joseph's
13	Saint Joseph's	4–14	0–2 vs. UMass
14	Duquesne	3–15	

== Schedule ==
Session	Game	Time*	Matchup	Score	Television	Attendance
First round – Wednesday, March 8
1	1	6:00 pm	No. 13 Saint Joseph's vs. No. 12 Massachusetts	63–70	ASN	5,517
1	2	8:30 pm	No. 14 Duquesne vs. No. 11 Saint Louis	71–72	ASN	5,517
Second round – Thursday, March 9
2	3	Noon	No. 9 Davidson vs. No. 8 La Salle	82–73	NBCSN	7,509
2	4	2:30 pm	No. 12 Massachusetts vs. No. 5 St. Bonaventure	60–73	NBCSN	7,509
3	5	6:00 pm	No. 10 Fordham vs. No. 7 George Mason	71–82 ^{OT}	NBCSN	5,442
3	6	8:30 pm	No. 11 Saint Louis vs. No. 6 George Washington	46–63	NBCSN	5,442
Quarterfinals – Friday, March 10
4	7	Noon	No. 9 Davidson vs. No. 1 Dayton	73–67	NBCSN	6,641
4	8	2:30 pm	No. 5 St. Bonaventure vs. No. 4 Rhode Island	63–74	NBCSN	6,641
5	9	6:00 pm	No. 7 George Mason vs. No. 2 VCU	60–71	NBCSN	6,647
5	10	8:30 pm	No. 6 George Washington vs. No. 3 Richmond	67–70	NBCSN	6,647
Semifinals – Saturday, March 11
6	11	1:00 pm	No. 9 Davidson vs. No. 4 Rhode Island	60–84	CBSSN	6,886
6	12	3:30 pm	No. 3 Richmond vs. No. 2 VCU	77–87 ^{OT}	CBSSN	6,886
Championship – Sunday, March 12
7	13	12:30 pm	No. 4 Rhode Island vs. No. 2 VCU	70–63	CBS	7,025
*Game times in Eastern Time. (Note: The United States begins Daylight saving time at 2:00 am on Sunday, March 12. As a result, times through the semifinal games are in Eastern Standard Time while the Championship game time is in Eastern Daylight Time.) Rankings denote tournament seed

== Bracket ==
First round Wednesday, March 8 ASN
12	Massachusetts	70
13	St. Joseph's	63
11	Saint Louis	72
14	Duquesne	71

Second round Thursday, March 9 NBCSN
8	La Salle	73
9	Davidson	82
5	St. Bonaventure	73
12	Massachusetts	60
7	George Mason	82*
10	Fordham	71
6	George Washington	53
11	Saint Louis	46

Quarterfinals; Friday, March 10; NBCSN
1	Dayton	67
9	Davidson	73
4	Rhode Island	74
5	St. Bonaventure	63
2	VCU	71
7	George Mason	60
3	Richmond	70
6	George Washington	67

Semifinals; Saturday, March 11; CBSSN
9	Davidson	60
4	Rhode Island	84
2	VCU	87*
3	Richmond	77

Championship; Sunday, March 12; CBS
4	Rhode Island	70
2	VCU	63

* denotes overtime period

== See also ==
- 2017 Atlantic 10 women's basketball tournament
