= 2016–17 Saint Louis Billikens men's basketball team =

American college basketball season

2016–17 Saint Louis Billikens men's basketball
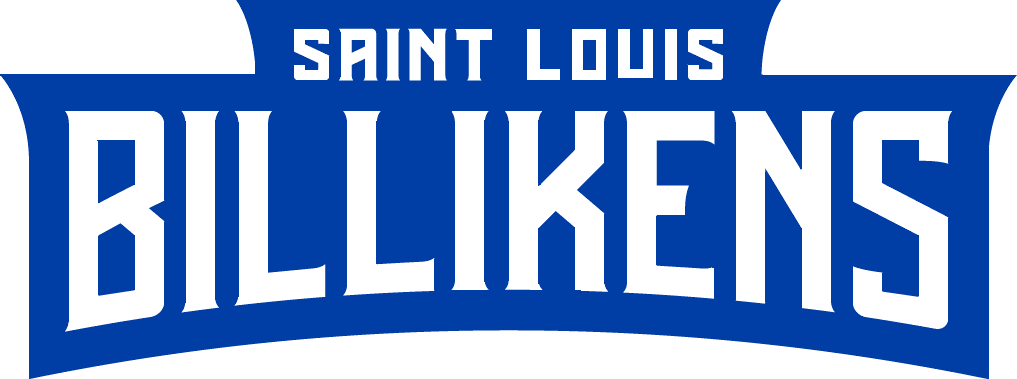
- Conference: Atlantic 10 Conference
- Record: 12–21 (6–12 A-10)
- Head coach: Travis Ford (1st season)
- Assistant coaches: Will Bailey; Van Macon; Corey Tate
- Home arena: Chaifetz Arena

2016–17 Atlantic 10 men's basketball standings
	Conf.				Overall
Team	W		L	PCT	W		L	PCT
Dayton	15	–	3	.833	24	–	8	.750
VCU	14	–	4	.778	26	–	9	.743
Rhode Island †	13	–	5	.722	25	–	10	.714
Richmond	13	–	5	.722	22	–	13	.629
Saint Bonaventure	11	–	7	.611	20	–	12	.625
George Washington	10	–	8	.556	20	–	15	.571
George Mason	9	–	9	.500	20	–	14	.588
La Salle	9	–	9	.500	15	–	15	.500
Davidson	8	–	10	.444	17	–	15	.531
Fordham	7	–	11	.389	13	–	19	.406
Saint Louis	6	–	12	.333	12	–	21	.364
UMass	4	–	14	.222	15	–	18	.455
Saint Joseph's	4	–	14	.222	11	–	20	.355
Duquesne	3	–	15	.167	10	–	22	.313
† 2017 A10 Tournament winner

The 2016–17 Saint Louis Billikens men's basketball team represented Saint Louis University in the 2016–17 NCAA Division I men's basketball season. The Billikens were led by first-year head coach Travis Ford. The team played their home games at Chaifetz Arena as a member of the Atlantic 10 Conference. They finished the season 12–21, 6–12 in A-10 play to finish in 11th place. They received the No. 11 seed in the A-10 tournament where they defeated Duquesne in the first round to advance to the second round where they lost to George Washington.

== Previous season ==
The Billikens finished the 2015–16 season with a record of 11–22, 5–13 in A-10 play to finish in a tie for 12th place. They defeated George Mason in the first round of the A-10 tournament to advance to the second round where they lost to George Washington.

On March 10, 2016, head coach Jim Crews was released from his coaching duties by the school. On March 30, the school hired Travis Ford as head coach.

== Preseason ==
The Billikens were picked to finish in last place in the A-10 Preseason Poll.

== Departures ==
Name	Number	Pos.	Height	Weight	Year	Hometown	Notes
Marcus Bartley	0	G	6'4"	180	Sophomore	Decatur, IL	Transferred to Southern Illinois
Milik Yarbrough	1	F	6'6"	230	Sophomore	Zion, IL	Transferred to Illinois State
Miles Reynolds	2	G	6'2"	170	Sophomore	Chicago, IL	Transferred to Pacific
Ash Yacoubou	3	G	6'4"	215	RS Senior	Bronx, NY	Graduated
Brett Jolly	14	F	6'9"	230	Sophomore	Southlake, TX	Transferred to Arkansas-Fort Smith D2
Austin Eagleton	24	G	6'3"	200	Junior	Springfield, IL	Walk-on; Graduated

== Incoming transfers ==
Name	Number	Pos.	Height	Weight	Year	Hometown	Previous School
D. J. Foreman	1	F	6'8"	240	Junior	Spring Valley, NY	Transferred from Rutgers. Under NCAA transfer rules, Foreman will have to sit out for the 2016–17 season. Will have two years of remaining eligibility.
Ty Graves	2	G	6'0"	165	Freshman	Greensboro, NC	Mid Year transfer from Boston College. Under NCAA transfer rules, Graves will have to sit out remainder of the 2016–17 season and the fall semester of the 2017. Will have three years of remaining eligibility.
Javon Bess	3	G	6'5"	220	Junior	Gahanna, OH	Transferred from Michigan State. Under NCAA transfer rules, Bess will have to sit out for the 2016–17 season. Will have two years of remaining eligibility.
Adonys Henriquez	10	G	6'6"	210	Junior	Orlando, FL	Transferred from Central Florida. Under NCAA transfer rules, Henriquez will have to sit out for the 2016–17 season. Will have two years of remaining eligibility.

== Incoming Recruits ==
College recruiting information
Name	Hometown	School	Height	Weight	Commit date
Jalen Johnson #44 PF	New Orleans, LA	University Laboratory School	6 ft 6 in (1.98 m)	N/A	May 4, 2016
Jalen Johnson #44 PF	Recruit ratings: Scout: Rivals: (77)				
Zeke Moore; SF	St. Louis, MO	Riverview Gardens High School	6 ft 6 in (1.98 m)	N/A	Nov 11, 2015
Zeke Moore; SF	Recruit ratings: Scout: Rivals: (NR)				
Overall recruit ranking:
Note: In many cases, Scout, Rivals, 247Sports, On3, and ESPN may conflict in their listings of height and weight.; In these cases, the average was taken. ESPN grades are on a 100-point scale.; Sources: "2016 Team Ranking". Rivals.

== Roster ==
2016–17 Saint Louis Billikens men's basketball team
Players
Coaches

Pos.	#	Name	Height	Weight	Year	Previous school	Hometown
F	1	D. J. Foreman (I) (redshirt)	6 ft 8 in (2.03 m)	240 lb (109 kg)	RS Jr	Massanutten Academy; Rutgers	Spring Valley, NY
G	2	Ty Graves (I) (redshirt)	6 ft 0 in (1.83 m)	165 lb (75 kg)	RS Fr	High Point Christian Academy; Boston College	Greensboro, NC
G	3	Javon Bess (I) (redshirt)	6 ft 5 in (1.96 m)	220 lb (100 kg)	RS Jr	Gahanna Lincoln; Michigan State	Columbus, OH
G	5	Davell Roby	6 ft 4 in (1.93 m)	200 lb (91 kg)	Jr	White Station	Memphis, TN
G	10	Adonys Henriquez (I) (redshirt)	6 ft 6 in (1.98 m)	210 lb (95 kg)	RS Jr	Orlando Christian Prep; Central Florida	Orlando, FL
G	11	Jermaine Bishop (injured) (redshirt)	6 ft 1 in (1.85 m)	160 lb (73 kg)	So	Holy Cross	Queens, NY
C	13	Matt Neufeld	6 ft 11 in (2.11 m)	220 lb (100 kg)	So	Sunrise Christian Academy	Victoria, BC
F	20	Jalen Johnson	6 ft 7 in (2.01 m)	190 lb (86 kg)	Fr	University Laboratory School	Baton Rouge, LA
G	21	Markos Psimitis (W)	6 ft 5 in (1.96 m)	195 lb (88 kg)	RS So	Experimental; Harris-Stowe	Mytilene, Greece
G/F	23	Zeke Moore	6 ft 6 in (1.98 m)	175 lb (79 kg)	Fr	Riverview Gardens	St. Louis, MO
G	24	Aaron Hines (W)	6 ft 0 in (1.83 m)	175 lb (79 kg)	RS Jr	Parkway North; John Wood CC	St. Louis, MO
C	25	Austin Gillman	6 ft 10 in (2.08 m)	220 lb (100 kg)	Jr	Oakville	St. Louis, MO
G	32	Mike Crawford	6 ft 4 in (1.93 m)	200 lb (91 kg)	Sr	Tipton	Tipton, IN
F	33	Elliott Welmer	6 ft 9 in (2.06 m)	215 lb (98 kg)	RS Fr	Bridgton Academy	Columbus, IN
F	35	Reggie Agbeko	6 ft 7 in (2.01 m)	240 lb (109 kg)	Sr	South Kent School	Buffalo, NY

Head coach

- Travis Ford (Kentucky)

Assistant coach(es)

- Will Bailey (UAB)
- Van Macon (Southampton)
- Corey Tate (Missouri)

Legend

- (C) Team captain
- (S) Suspended
- (I) Ineligible
- (W) Walk-on
- Injured
- Current redshirt

Roster

== Schedule and results ==
Date time, TV	Rank^{#}	Opponent^{#}	Result	Record	Site (attendance) city, state
Exhibition
Nov 4, 2016*; 7:00 pm		Greenville	W 124–85		Chaifetz Arena; St. Louis, MO
Regular season
Nov 11, 2016*; 7:00 pm, FSMW		Ball State; Men Who Speak Up Main Event	L 64-85	0-1	Chaifetz Arena (7,165); St. Louis, MO
Nov 14, 2016*; 7:00 pm, FSMW		Southern Utah; Men Who Speak Up Main Event	W 88–76	1-1	Chaifetz Arena (4,725); St. Louis, MO
Nov 17, 2016*; 7:00 pm, FSMW+		Eastern Illinois	W 74–69	2-1	Chaifetz Arena (4,948); St. Louis, MO
Nov 21, 2016*; 8:30 pm, YouTube		vs. BYU; Men Who Speak Up Main Event; Heavyweight semifinal	L 62–92	2-2	MGM Grand Garden Arena (2,107); Las Vegas, NV
Nov 23, 2016*; 8:30 pm, YouTube		vs. Alabama; Men Who Speak Up Main Event; Heavyweight consolation	L 57–62	2-3	MGM Grand Garden Arena; Las Vegas, NV
Nov 29, 2016*; 7:00 pm, A-10 DN		Samford	L 64–68	2-4	Chaifetz Arena (4,916); St. Louis, MO
Dec 3, 2016*; 7:00 pm, FSMW+		Kansas State	L 53–84	2-5	Chaifetz Arena (7,618); St. Louis, MO
Dec 6, 2016*; 7:00 pm, FSMW+		at Wichita State	L 45–75	2-6	Charles Koch Arena (10,157); Wichita, KS
Dec 11, 2016*; 2:00 pm, A-10 DN		Chicago State	W 45–43	3-6	Chaifetz Arena (4,630); St. Louis, MO
Dec 14, 2016*; 7:00 pm, ESPN3		at Southern Illinois	L 55–70	3-7	SIU Arena (4,459); Carbondale, IL
Dec 17, 2016*; 4:00 pm, FSMW		SIUE	W 72–58	4-7	Chaifetz Arena (2,968); St. Louis, MO
Dec 22, 2016*; 7:00 pm, FSMW+		Winthrop	L 55–66	4-8	Chaifetz Arena (5,345); St. Louis, MO
Dec 30, 2016; 6:00 pm, ESPNU		Rhode Island	L 56−90	4-9 (0−1)	Chaifetz Arena (7,945); St. Louis, MO
Jan 4, 2017; 6:00 pm		at La Salle	L 54–75	4-10 (0–2)	Tom Gola Arena (1,303); Philadelphia, PA
Jan 8, 2017; 1:00 pm, NBCSN		Davidson	L 66–77	4-11 (0–3)	Chaifetz Arena (6,538); St. Louis, MO
Jan 11, 2017; 6:00 pm, Facebook Live		at Duquesne	L 66–73	4-12 (0–4)	Palumbo Center (1,070); Pittsburgh, PA
Jan 14, 2017; 1:30 pm, NBCSN		at George Mason	W 63–56	5-12 (1–4)	EagleBank Arena (3,651); Fairfax, VA
Jan 17, 2017; 8:00 pm, ASN		St. Bonaventure	L 52–71	5-13 (1–5)	Chaifetz Arena (4,127); St. Louis, MO
Jan 22, 2017; 1:00 pm, CBSSN		at Dayton	L 46–67	5-14 (1–6)	UD Arena (13,338); Dayton, OH
Jan 25, 2017; 7:00 pm, FSMW		Massachusetts	W 74–70	6-14 (2–6)	Chaifetz Arena (6,265); St. Louis, MO
Jan 28, 2017; 3:00 pm, ASN		at George Washington	L 55–63	6-15 (2–7)	Charles E. Smith Center (3,193); Washington, D.C.
Feb 1, 2017; 6:00 pm, FSMW		George Mason	W 76–74 ^{2OT}	7-15 (3–7)	Chaifetz Arena (4,507); St. Louis, MO
Feb 4, 2017*; 7:00 pm		North Carolina A&T	W 78–59	8-15	Chaifetz Arena (5,921); St. Louis, MO
Feb 8, 2017; 6:00 pm, FSMW/Facebook Live		at St. Bonaventure	L 55–70	8-16 (3–8)	Reilly Center (3,763); Olean, NY
Feb 11, 2017; 7:00 pm, FSMW+		Duquesne	W 87–81	9-16 (4–8)	Chaifetz Arena (5,964); St. Louis, MO
Feb 14, 2017; 7:00 pm, CBSSN		Dayton	L 63–85	9-17 (4–9)	Chaifetz Arena (5,082); St. Louis, MO
Feb 18, 2017; 1:00 pm		at Fordham	L 40–54	9-18 (4–10)	Rose Hill Gymnasium (2,431); Bronx, NY
Feb 22, 2017; 6:00 pm, ASN		at VCU	L 50–64	9-19 (4–11)	Siegel Center (7,637); Richmond, VA
Feb 25, 2017; 3:30 pm, NBCSN		Saint Joseph's	W 61–60	10–19 (10-19)	Chaifetz Arena (6,079); St. Louis, MO
Mar 1, 2017; 7:00 pm, FSMW		La Salle	W 70–55	11–19 (6–11)	Chaifetz Arena (5,932); St. Louis, MO
Mar 4, 2017; 7:00 pm, FSMW		at Richmond	L 62–72	11–20 (6–12)	The Robins Center (7,201); Richmond, VA
Atlantic 10 tournament
Mar 8, 2017; 8:30 pm, ASN	(11)	vs. (14) Duquesne; First round	W 72–71	12–20	PPG Paints Arena (5,517); Pittsburgh, PA
Mar 9, 2017; 8:30 pm, NBCSN	(11)	vs. (6) George Washington; Second round	L 46–53	12–21	PPG Paints Arena (5,442); Pittsburgh, PA
*Non-conference game. ^{#}Rankings from AP Poll. (#) Tournament seedings in parentheses. All times are in Central Time.
