= Spencer Littleson =

American basketball player (born 1998)

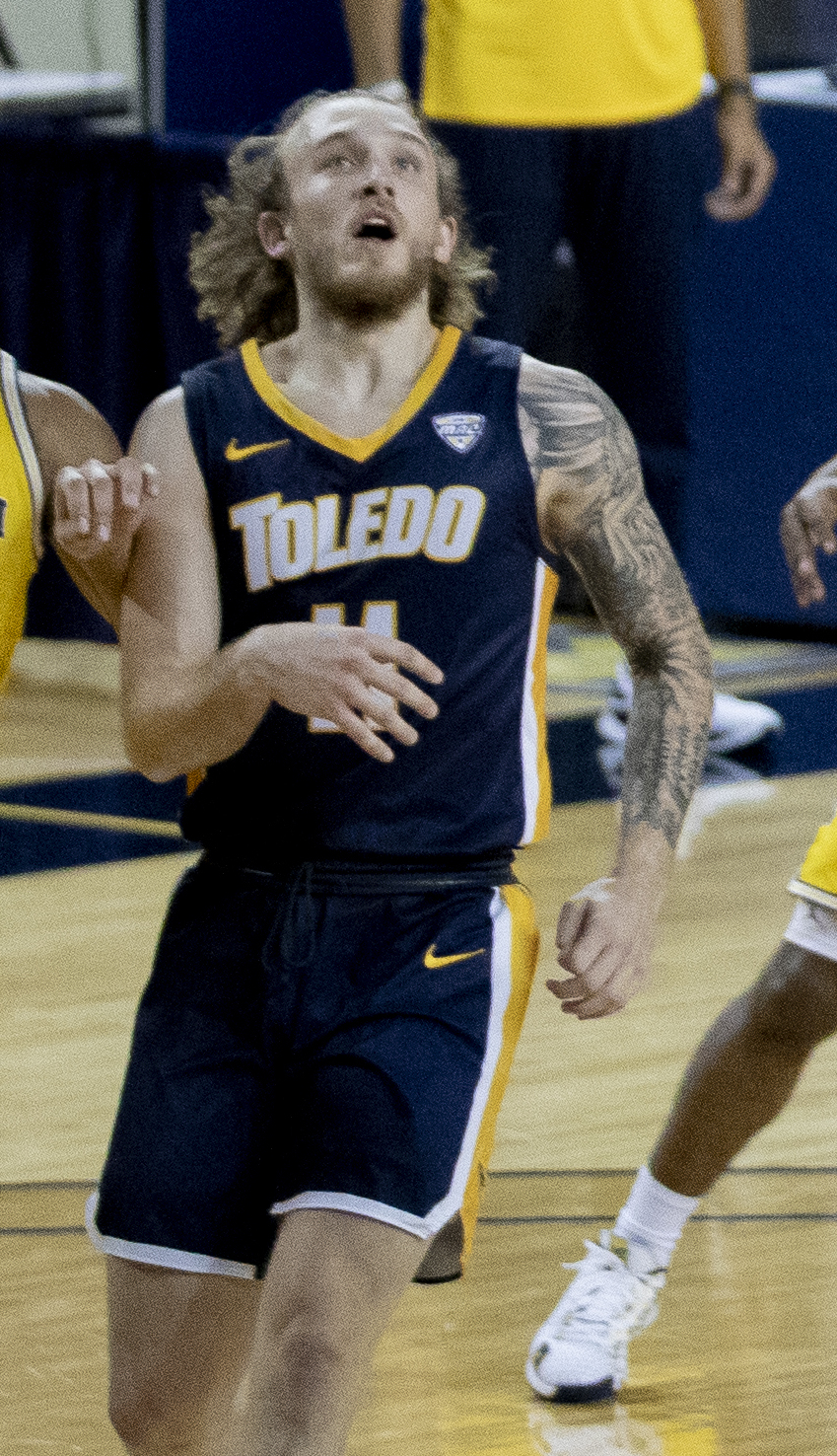
- Littleton with Toledo in 2020

No. 11 – CB Menorca
- Position: Shooting guard
- League: Primera FEB

Personal information
- Born: May 29, 1998 (age 28)
- Listed height: 6 ft 4 in (1.93 m)
- Listed weight: 200 lb (91 kg)

Career information
- High school: Rochester Adams (Rochester Hills, Michigan)
- College: Duquesne (2016–2017); Toledo (2018–2021)
- NBA draft: 2021: undrafted
- Playing career: 2021–present

Career history
- 2021–2022: Limburg United
- 2022–2023: Imortal Luzigas
- 2023–2025: Grupo Alega Cantabria
- 2025–present: Bàsquet Menorca

Career highlights
- Belgian Cup winner (2022); Second-team All-MAC (2021); MAC All-Defensive Team (2021)

Spencer Phillip Littleson (born May 29, 1998) is an American professional basketball player for Bàsquet Menorca of the Primera FEB. He played college basketball for Toledo and Duquesne.

== High school career ==
Littleson attended Rochester Adams High School. He grew from 5'10 to 6'3 during his freshman season. As a senior, he averaged 25.1 points, 6.3 rebounds, 3.2 assists, and 2.0 steals per game. Littleson finished third in the voting for 2016 Mr. Basketball of Michigan. He committed to play college basketball at Duquesne.

== College career ==
As a freshman at Duquesne, Littleson averaged 1.6 points and 1.1 rebounds. Following the season he transferred to Toledo. Toledo coach Tod Kowalczyk called him an "unbelievable worker" and said they should have recruited him out of high school. As a sophomore, Littleson averaged 4.2 points and 2.2 rebounds per game. On November 10, 2019, he scored a career-high 27 points in an 96-70 win against Marshall. Littleson averaged 10.5 points per game as a junior. As a senior, Littleson averaged 13.4 points and 3.2 rebounds per game. He was named to the Second Team All-MAC and the MAC All-Defensive Team. Littleson led Division I with a school-record 103 three-point field goals and finished second nationally with a 47.2 three-point percentage. He was selected to participate in the State Farm 3-Point Championship.

== Professional career ==
On June 28, 2021, Littleson signed his first professional contract with Limburg United of the BNXT League.

On August 28, 2022, Littleson signed with the Imortal Luzigas of the Liga Portuguesa de Basquetebol.

On August 2, 2023, Littleson signed with Grupo Alega Cantabria of the LEB Oro.

On June 27, 2025, Littleson signed with Bàsquet Menorca of the Primera FEB.
