= 2016–17 Atlantic 10 Conference men's basketball season =

- League: NCAA Division I
- Sport: Basketball
- Teams: 14
- TV partner(s): CBSSN, NBCSN, CBS

Regular Season
- Season champions: Dayton
- Runners-up: VCU
- Season MVP: T. J. Cline (Richmond)
- Top scorer: Jack Gibbs (Davidson) 22.1

Tournament
- Champions: Rhode Island
- Runners-up: VCU
- Finals MVP: E. C. Matthews (Rhode Island)

Atlantic 10 men's basketball seasons
- ← 2015–16 2017–18 →

2016–17 Atlantic 10 men's basketball standings
	Conf.				Overall
Team	W		L	PCT	W		L	PCT
Dayton	15	–	3	.833	24	–	8	.750
VCU	14	–	4	.778	26	–	9	.743
Rhode Island †	13	–	5	.722	25	–	10	.714
Richmond	13	–	5	.722	22	–	13	.629
Saint Bonaventure	11	–	7	.611	20	–	12	.625
George Washington	10	–	8	.556	20	–	15	.571
George Mason	9	–	9	.500	20	–	14	.588
La Salle	9	–	9	.500	15	–	15	.500
Davidson	8	–	10	.444	17	–	15	.531
Fordham	7	–	11	.389	13	–	19	.406
Saint Louis	6	–	12	.333	12	–	21	.364
UMass	4	–	14	.222	15	–	18	.455
Saint Joseph's	4	–	14	.222	11	–	20	.355
Duquesne	3	–	15	.167	10	–	22	.313
† 2017 A10 Tournament winner

The 2016–17 Atlantic 10 Conference men's basketball season was the 41st season of Atlantic 10 Conference basketball. The 2017 Atlantic 10 men's basketball tournament was held at the PPG Paints Arena in Pittsburgh, Pennsylvania from March 8–12, 2017. Dayton won the regular season championship. Rhode Island won the A-10 Tournament by beating VCU in the tournament championship. As a result, Rhode Island received the conference's automatic bid to the NCAA tournament. Three A-10 teams received bids to the NCAA Tournament: Dayton, VCU, and Rhode Island. Both Dayton and VCU lost in the first round while Rhode Island lost in the second round. Richmond received the conference's sole bid to the National Invitation Tournament while George Mason and George Washington received bids to the College Basketball Invitational.

== Head coaches ==
=== Coaching changes ===
On March 10, 2016, Saint Louis head coach Jim Crews was released from his coaching duties by the school. On March 30, the school hired Travis Ford as head coach.

=== Coaches ===
Team	Head coach	Previous job	Seasons at school	Overall record	A-10 record	NCAA Tournaments	NCAA Final Fours	NCAA Championships
Davidson	Bob McKillop	Long Island Lutheran High School	28	516–315 (.621)	24–12 (.667)	8	0	0
Dayton	Archie Miller	Arizona (asst.)	6	130–59 (.688)	59–32 (.648)	3	0	0
Duquesne	Jim Ferry	LIU Brooklyn	5	50–75 (.400)	18–50 (.265)	0	0	0
Fordham	Jeff Neubauer	Eastern Kentucky	2	17–14 (.548)	8–10 (.444)	0	0	0
George Mason	Dave Paulsen	Bucknell	2	11–21 (.344)	5–13 (.278)	0	0	0
George Washington	Maurice Joseph	George Washington (asst.)	1	0–0 (–)	0–0 (–)	0	0	0
La Salle	John Giannini	Maine	13	184–193 (.488)	84–112 (.429)	1	0	0
UMass	Derek Kellogg	Memphis (asst.)	9	152–128 (.543)	65–75 (.464)	1	0	0
Rhode Island	Dan Hurley	Wagner	5	62–64 (.492)	30–38 (.441)	0	0	0
Richmond	Chris Mooney	Air Force	12	203–162 (.556)	96–84 (.533)	2	0	0
Saint Joseph's	Phil Martelli	Saint Joseph's (asst.)	22	403–273 (.596)	200–146 (.578)	7	0	0
Saint Louis	Travis Ford	Oklahoma State	1	0–0 (–)	0–0 (–)	0	0	0
St. Bonaventure	Mark Schmidt	Robert Morris	10	146–131 (.527)	70–78 (.542)	1	0	0
VCU	Will Wade	Chattanooga	2	25–11 (.694)	14–4 (.778)	1	0	0

Notes:

- All records, appearances, titles, etc. are from time with current school only.
- Overall and A-10 records are from time at current school and are before the beginning of the season.

== Preseason ==
=== Preseason poll ===
Prior to the season at the conference's annual media day, awards and a poll were chosen by a panel of the league’s head coaches and select media members.

Rank	Team
1	Dayton (16)
2	Rhode Island (12)
3	VCU
4	Davidson
5	St. Bonaventure
6	Richmond
7	La Salle
8	George Washington
9	Saint Joseph's
10	Massachusetts
11	Fordham
12	George Mason
13	Duquesne
14	Saint Louis
(first place votes)

=== Preseason All-Conference Teams ===
Award	Recipients
Preseason All-Atlantic 10 First Team	Jack Gibbs, Davidson
Preseason All-Atlantic 10 First Team	Charles Cooke, Dayton
Preseason All-Atlantic 10 First Team	Tyler Cavanaugh, George Washington
Preseason All-Atlantic 10 First Team	T. J. Cline, Richmond
Preseason All-Atlantic 10 First Team	Jaylen Adams, St. Bonaventure
Preseason All-Atlantic 10 Second Team	Scoochie Smith, Dayton
Preseason All-Atlantic 10 Second Team	Jordan Price, La Salle
Preseason All-Atlantic 10 Second Team	Hassan Martin, Rhode Island
Preseason All-Atlantic 10 Second Team	E. C. Matthews, Rhode Island
Preseason All-Atlantic 10 Second Team	Mo Alie-Cox, VCU
Preseason All-Atlantic 10 Third Team	Peyton Aldridge, Davidson
Preseason All-Atlantic 10 Third Team	Joseph Chartouney, Fordham
Preseason All-Atlantic 10 Third Team	Dante Clark, UMass
Preseason All-Atlantic 10 Third Team	ShawnDre' Jones, Richmond
Preseason All-Atlantic 10 Third Team	JeQuan Lewis, VCU

== Regular season ==
=== Early season tournaments ===
Team	Tournament	Finish
Davidson	Puerto Rico Tip-Off	5th Place
Dayton	Wooden Legacy	5th Place
Duquesne	Bluegrass Showcase	7th Place
Fordham	Johnny Bach Classic	Champions
George Mason	Gulf Coast Showcase	5th Place
George Washington	CBE Hall of Fame Classic	3rd Place
La Salle	none	—
UMass	Gotham Classic	Champions
Rhode Island	Hall of Fame Tip Off	2nd Place
Richmond	Barclays Center Classic	3rd Place
Saint Joseph's	Paradise Jam	4th Place
Saint Louis	Men Who Speak Up Main Event	4th Place
St. Bonaventure	Lone Star Showcase	Runners-up
VCU	Battle 4 Atlantis	5th Place

=== Conference matrix ===
This table summarizes the head-to-head results between teams in conference play. Each team played 18 conference games: 1 game vs. 8 opponents (4 home, 4 away) and 2 games against 5 opponents (home and away).

	Davidson	Dayton	Duquesne	Fordham	GM	GW	La Salle	UMass	Rhode Island	Richmond	St. Joseph's	St. Louis	St. Bonaventure	VCU
vs. Davidson	–	1–0	0–1	1–1	1–0	1–0	1–1	0–1	2–0	2–0	0–1	0–1	0–1	1–1
vs. Dayton	0–1	–	0–2	0–1	0–1	1–0	0–1	1–0	0–2	0–1	0–1	0–2	0–2	1–1
vs. Duquesne	1–0	2–0	–	1–1	1–0	2–0	1–0	0–1	1–0	1–0	1–0	1–1	2–0	1–0
vs. Fordham	1–1	1–0	1–1	–	1–0	1–0	2–0	0–1	0–1	2–0	1–1	0–1	1–0	0–1
vs. George Mason	0–1	1–0	0–1	0–1	–	2–0	0–1	0–2	1–0	0–2	0–1	2–0	1–0	2–0
vs. George Washington	1–1	0–1	0–2	0–1	0–2	–	1–0	0–1	1–0	2–0	1–0	0–1	0–1	2–0
vs. La Salle	0–1	1–0	0–1	0–2	1–0	0–1	–	1–1	1–1	1–0	1–1	1–1	1–0	1–0
vs. UMass	1–0	0–1	1–0	1–0	2–0	1–0	1–1	–	2–0	1–0	0–2	1–0	2–0	1–0
vs. Rhode Island	0–2	2–0	0–1	1–0	0–1	0–1	1–1	0–2	–	1–0	0–2	0–1	0–1	0–1
vs. Richmond	0–2	1–0	0–1	0–2	2–0	0–2	0–1	0–1	0–1	–	0–1	0–1	0–1	2–0
vs. Saint Joseph's	1–0	1–0	0–1	1–1	1–0	0–1	1–1	2–0	2–0	1–0	–	1–0	2–0	1–0
vs. Saint Louis	1–0	2–0	1–1	1–0	0–2	1–0	1–1	0–1	1–0	1–0	0–1	–	2–0	1–0
vs. St. Bonaventure	1–0	2–0	0–2	0–1	0–1	1–0	0–1	0–2	1–0	1–0	0–2	0–2	–	1–0
vs. VCU	1–1	1–1	0–1	1–0	0–2	0–2	0–1	0–1	1–0	0–2	0–1	0–1	0–1	–
Total	8–10	15–3	3–15	7–11	9–9	10–8	9–9	4–14	13–5	13–5	4–14	6–12	11–7	14–4

=== Weekly honors ===
Throughout the conference regular season, the Atlantic 10 offices name a player of the week and rookie of the week each Monday.

Week	Player of the week	Rookie of the week
November 14, 2016	ShawnDre' Jones, Richmond; Shavar Newkirk, Saint Joseph's	Mike Lewis II, Duquesne
November 21, 2016	Jack Gibbs, Davidson	DeJon Jarreau, UMass
November 28, 2016	T. J. Cline, Richmond; JeQuan Lewis, VCU	Mike Lewis II, Duquesne
December 5, 2016	B. J. Johnson, La Salle; Jaylen Adams, St. Bonaventure	Mike Lewis II, Duquesne
December 12, 2016	Marquise Moore, George Mason	Isiaha Mike, Duquesne
December 19, 2016	B. J. Johnson, La Salle	Luwane Pipkins, UMass
December 26, 2016	Peyton Aldridge, Davidson; Marquise Moore, George Mason	Jon Axel Gudmundsson, Davidson; Isiaha Mike, Duquesne
January 2, 2017	T. J. Cline, Richmond	Jeff Dowtin, Rhode Island; Charlie Brown, Saint Joseph's
January 9, 2017	Scoochie Smith, Dayton	De'Monte Buckingham, Richmond
January 16, 2017	Peyton Aldridge, Davidson; T. J. Cline, Richmond	De'Monte Buckingham, Richmond
January 23, 2017	Javontae Hawkins, Fordham; Marquise Moore, George Mason	Charlie Brown Jr., Saint Joseph's
January 30, 2017	T. J. Cline, Richmond	Isiaha Mike, Duquesne
February 6, 2017	Otis Livingston, George Mason; Matt Mobley, St. Bonaventure	Jeff Dowtin, Rhode Island
February 13, 2017	Tyler Cavanaugh, George Washington; Donte Clark, UMass	Charlie Brown, Saint Joseph's
February 20, 2017	Jack Gibbs, Davidson; JeQuan Lewis, VCU	Mike Lewis II, Duquesne
February 27, 2017	Jared Terrell, Rhode Island; Matt Mobley, St. Bonaventure	Jalen Johnson, Saint Louis
March 6, 2017	Tyler Cavanaugh, George Washington	De'Monte Buckingham, Richmond

== Conference Awards ==
Award	Recipients
Coach of the Year	Archie Miller (Dayton)
Player of the Year	T. J. Cline (Richmond)
Defensive Player of the Year	Hassan Martin (Rhode Island)
Rookie of the Year	De'Monte Buckingham (Richmond)
Sixth Man of the Year	Kyle Davis (Dayton)
Chris Daniels Most Improved Player of the Year	Marquise Moore (George Mason)
First Team	Jack Gibbs (Davidson); Scoochie Smith (Dayton); T. J. Cline (Richmond); Jaylen Adams (St. Bonaventure); JeQuan Lewis (VCU)
Second Team	Peyton Aldridge (Davidson); Charles Cooke (Dayton); Marquise Moore (George Mason); Tyler Cavanaugh (George Washington); Hassan Martin (Rhode Island)
Third Team	Kendall Pollard (Dayton); ShawnDre' Jones (Richmond); E. C. Matthews (Rhode Island); Matt Mobley (St. Bonaventure); Justin Tillman (VCU)
All-Academic Team	Joseph Chartouny (Fordham); Christian Sengfelder (Fordham); Tyler Cavanaugh (George Washington); Patrick Steeves (George Washington); Mike Crawford (Saint Louis)
All-Defensive Team	Charles Cooke (Dayton); Kyle Davis (Dayton); Yuta Watanabe (George Washington); Hassan Martin (Rhode Island); Mo Alie-Cox (VCU)
All-Rookie Team	Mike Lewis II (Duquesne); Isiaha Mike (Duquesne); Jeff Dowtin (Rhode Island); De'Monte Buckingham (Richmond); Charlie Brown Jr. (Saint Joseph's)

== Rankings ==
Legend
Increase in ranking
Decrease in ranking
Not ranked previous week

		Pre	Wk 2	Wk 3	Wk 4	Wk 5	Wk 6	Wk 7	Wk 8	Wk 9	Wk 10	Wk 11	Wk 12	Wk 13	Wk 14	Wk 15	Wk 16	Wk 17	Wk 18	Wk 19	Final
Davidson	AP	RV																			
Davidson	C																				
Dayton	AP	RV	RV	RV							RV		RV			RV	RV	RV	RV		
Dayton	C	RV	RV	RV							RV				RV	RV	RV	RV	RV	RV	
Duquesne	AP																				
Duquesne	C																				
Fordham	AP																				
Fordham	C																				
George Mason	AP																				
George Mason	C																				
George Washington	AP																				
George Washington	C																				
La Salle	AP																				
La Salle	C																				
UMass	AP																				
UMass	C																				
Rhode Island	AP	23	21	23	21																
Rhode Island	C	24	22	25	25	RV															
Richmond	AP																				
Richmond	C																				
Saint Joseph's	AP																				
Saint Joseph's	C																				
Saint Louis	AP																				
Saint Louis	C																				
St. Bonaventure	AP																				
St. Bonaventure	C																				
VCU	AP				RV					RV	RV			RV	RV	RV	RV	RV	RV	RV	
VCU	C	RV	RV	RV	RV												RV	RV			

== Postseason ==
=== 2017 A-10 tournament ===
Session	Game	Time*	Matchup	Score	Television	Attendance
First round – Wednesday, March 8
1	1	6:00 pm	No. 13 Saint Joseph's vs. No. 12 Massachusetts	63–70	ASN	5,517
1	2	8:30 pm	No. 14 Duquesne vs. No. 11 Saint Louis	71–72	ASN	5,517
Second round – Thursday, March 9
2	3	Noon	No. 9 Davidson vs. No. 8 La Salle	82–73	NBCSN	7,509
2	4	2:30 pm	No. 12 Massachusetts vs. No. 5 St. Bonaventure	60–73	NBCSN	7,509
3	5	6:00 pm	No. 10 Fordham vs. No. 7 George Mason	71–82 ^{OT}	NBCSN	5,442
3	6	8:30 pm	No. 11 Saint Louis vs. No. 6 George Washington	46–63	NBCSN	5,442
Quarterfinals – Friday, March 10
4	7	Noon	No. 9 Davidson vs. No. 1 Dayton	73–67	NBCSN	6,641
4	8	2:30 pm	No. 5 St. Bonaventure vs. No. 4 Rhode Island	63–74	NBCSN	6,641
5	9	6:00 pm	No. 7 George Mason vs. No. 2 VCU	60–71	NBCSN	6,647
5	10	8:30 pm	No. 6 George Washington vs. No. 3 Richmond	67–70	NBCSN	6,647
Semifinals – Saturday, March 11
6	11	1:00 pm	No. 9 Davidson vs. No. 4 Rhode Island	60–84	CBSSN	6,886
6	12	3:30 pm	No. 3 Richmond vs. No. 2 VCU	77–87 ^{OT}	CBSSN	6,886
Championship – Sunday, March 12
7	13	12:30 pm	No. 4 Rhode Island vs. No. 2 VCU	70–63	CBS	7,025
*Game times in Eastern Time. (Note: The United States begins Daylight saving time at 2:00 am on Sunday, March 12. As a result, times through the semifinal games are in Eastern Standard Time while the Championship game time is in Eastern Daylight Time.) Rankings denote tournament seed

=== NCAA tournament ===
The Atlantic 10 Conference received three bids to the 2017 NCAA Division I men's basketball tournament.

Seed	Region	School	First Four	First Round	Second Round	Sweet Sixteen	Elite Eight	Final Four	Championship
7	South	Dayton	N/A	eliminated by (10) Wichita State, 58–64					
10	West	VCU	N/A	eliminated by (7) Saint Mary's, 77–85					
11	Midwest	Rhode Island	N/A	defeated (6) Creighton, 84–72	eliminated by (3) Oregon, 72–75				
		W–L (%):	0–0 (–)	1–2 (.333)	0–1 (.000)	0–0 (–)	0–0 (–)	0–0 (–)	0–0 (–) Total: 1–3 (.250)

=== National Invitation tournament ===
Richmond received the sole NIT bid for the conference.

Seed	Bracket	School	First round	Second round	Quarterfinals	Semifinals	Finals
6	Iowa	Richmond	defeated No. 3 Alabama, 71–64	defeated No. 7 Oakland, 87–83	eliminated by No. 4 TCU, 68–86		
		W–L (%):	1–0 (1.000)	1–0 (1.000)	0–1 (.000)	0–0 (–)	0–0 (–) Total: 2–1 (.667)

=== College Basketball Invitational ===
George Mason and George Washington received bids to the CBI.

School	First round	Quarterfinals	Semifinals	Finals (Best of Three)
George Mason	eliminated by Loyola (MD), 58–73			
George Washington	defeated Toledo, 73–69	eliminated by UIC, 71–80		
W–L (%):	1–1 (.500)	0–1 (.000)	0–0 (–)	0–0 (–) Total: 1–2 (.333)
