= 2016–17 Dayton Flyers men's basketball team =

American college basketball season

2016–17 Dayton Flyers men's basketball

Atlantic 10 regular season champions

NCAA tournament, First Round
- Conference: Atlantic 10 Conference
- Record: 24–8 (15–3 A-10)
- Head coach: Archie Miller (6th season)
- Assistant coaches: Kevin Kuwik; Allen Griffin; Tom Ostrom
- Home arena: University of Dayton Arena

2016–17 Atlantic 10 men's basketball standings
	Conf.				Overall
Team	W		L	PCT	W		L	PCT
Dayton	15	–	3	.833	24	–	8	.750
VCU	14	–	4	.778	26	–	9	.743
Rhode Island †	13	–	5	.722	25	–	10	.714
Richmond	13	–	5	.722	22	–	13	.629
Saint Bonaventure	11	–	7	.611	20	–	12	.625
George Washington	10	–	8	.556	20	–	15	.571
George Mason	9	–	9	.500	20	–	14	.588
La Salle	9	–	9	.500	15	–	15	.500
Davidson	8	–	10	.444	17	–	15	.531
Fordham	7	–	11	.389	13	–	19	.406
Saint Louis	6	–	12	.333	12	–	21	.364
UMass	4	–	14	.222	15	–	18	.455
Saint Joseph's	4	–	14	.222	11	–	20	.355
Duquesne	3	–	15	.167	10	–	22	.313
† 2017 A10 Tournament winner

The 2016–17 Dayton Flyers men's basketball team represented the University of Dayton during the 2016–17 NCAA Division I men's basketball season. The Flyers, led by sixth-year head coach Archie Miller, played their home games at the University of Dayton Arena as members of the Atlantic 10 Conference. They finished the season 24–8, 15–3 in A-10 play to win the regular season A-10 championship. They received the No. 1 seed in the A-10 tournament where they lost in the quarterfinals to Davidson. They received an at-large bid to the NCAA tournament where they lost in the first round to Wichita State.

On March 25, 2017, Archie Miller left the school to accept the head coaching position at Indiana. He finished at Dayton with a six year record of 139–63. The school then hired Dayton alum Anthony Grant as the new head coach on March 30.

== Previous season ==
The Flyers finished the 2015–16 season with a record of 25–8, 14–4 in A-10 play to become regular season A-10 co-champions. They defeated Richmond in the quarterfinals of the A-10 tournament to advance to the semifinals where they lost to Saint Joseph's. They received an at-large bid to the NCAA tournament, their third consecutive at-large bid, as a No. 7 seed in the Midwest Region where they lost to No. 10 seed Syracuse in the first round.

== Preseason ==
The Flyers were picked to win the A-10 in the conference's preseason poll. Charles Cooke and Scoochie Smith were selected to the preseason All-A-10 first team. Cooke and Kyle Davis were also selected to the All-Defensive team.

== Departures ==
Name	Number	Pos.	Height	Weight	Year	Hometown	Notes
Steve McElvene	5	C	6'11"	268	RS Freshman	New Haven, IN	Deceased, 5/12/2016
William Dupuy	10	G	5'8"	157	Junior	Colleyville, TX	Walk-on; didn't return
Dyshawn Pierre	21	F	6'6"	223	Senior	Whitby, ON	Graduated
Bobby Wehrli	22	F	6'6"	205	Senior	Naperville, IL	Graduated
Michael Schwieterman	24	G	6'3"	195	Sophomore	Kettering, OH	Walk-on; didn't return

== Incoming recruits ==
College recruiting information
Name	Hometown	School	Height	Weight	Commit date
Trey Landers; SG	Huber Heights, OH	Wayne High School	6 ft 3 in (1.91 m)	170 lb (77 kg)	Mar 2, 2015
Trey Landers; SG	Recruit ratings: Scout: Rivals: (79)				
Overall recruit ranking:
Note: In many cases, Scout, Rivals, 247Sports, On3, and ESPN may conflict in their listings of height and weight.; In these cases, the average was taken. ESPN grades are on a 100-point scale.; Sources: "2016 Team Ranking". Rivals.

== Roster ==
2016–17 Dayton Flyers men's basketball team
Players
Coaches

Pos.	#	Name	Height	Weight	Year	Previous school	Hometown
F	0	Josh Cunningham	6 ft 7 in (2.01 m)	225 lb (102 kg)	RS So	Morgan Park; Bradley	Chicago, IL
G	1	Darrell Davis	6 ft 4 in (1.93 m)	174 lb (79 kg)	Jr	Douglass Academy	Detroit, MI
F	2	Sam Miller	6 ft 9 in (2.06 m)	238 lb (108 kg)	So	Gonzaga College	Washington, D.C.
G	3	Kyle Davis	6 ft 0 in (1.83 m)	175 lb (79 kg)	Sr	Morgan Park	Chicago, IL
G	4	Charles Cooke	6 ft 5 in (1.96 m)	196 lb (89 kg)	RS Sr	Trenton Catholic Academy; James Madison	Trenton, NJ
F	10	Jack Parsley (W)	6 ft 5 in (1.96 m)	225 lb (102 kg)	Jr	Granville	Granville, OH
G	11	Scoochie Smith	6 ft 2 in (1.88 m)	185 lb (84 kg)	Sr	Putnam Science Academy	New York, NY
G	12	Trey Landers	6 ft 4 in (1.93 m)	219 lb (99 kg)	Fr	Wayne	Huber Heights, OH
G	14	Jeremiah Bonsu (W)	5 ft 11 in (1.8 m)	162 lb (73 kg)	Sr	Pickerington North	Pickerington, OH
G	15	John Crosby	6 ft 2 in (1.88 m)	194 lb (88 kg)	So	New Hampton School	Baltimore, MD
F	20	Xeyrius Williams	6 ft 8 in (2.03 m)	210 lb (95 kg)	So	Wayne	Huber Heights, OH
G	23	Jack Westerfield (W)	6 ft 1 in (1.85 m)	180 lb (82 kg)	So	St. Xavier	Cincinnati, OH
G	24	Adam Goines (W)	6 ft 3 in (1.91 m)	193 lb (88 kg)	Fr	Walnut Hills	Cincinnati, OH
F	25	Kendall Pollard	6 ft 6 in (1.98 m)	230 lb (104 kg)	Sr	Simeon Career Academy	Chicago, IL
F	33	Ryan Mikesell	6 ft 7 in (2.01 m)	210 lb (95 kg)	So	St. Henry	St. Henry, OH
F	34	Kostas Antetokounmpo (redshirt)	6 ft 11 in (2.11 m)	190 lb (86 kg)	Fr	Dominican	Athens, Greece
G	44	Joey Gruden (W)	6 ft 2 in (1.88 m)	172 lb (78 kg)	Sr	Sycamore	Leesburg, VA
G	51	Ben Agnieszka (W)	6 ft 3 in (1.91 m)	196 lb (89 kg)	Fr	Walsh Jesuit	Brecksville, OH

Head coach

- Archie Miller (NC State)

Assistant coach(es)

- Kevin Kuwik (Notre Dame)
- Allen Griffin (Syracuse)
- Tom Ostrom (Minnesota)

Legend

- (C) Team captain
- (S) Suspended
- (I) Ineligible
- (W) Walk-on
- Injured
- Current redshirt

Roster

== Schedule and results ==
Date time, TV	Rank^{#}	Opponent^{#}	Result	Record	Site (attendance) city, state
Exhibition
Nov 4, 2016*; 7:00 pm		Findlay	W 76–69		UD Arena (13,455); Dayton, OH
Non-conference regular season
Nov 11, 2016*; 7:00 pm, SPCSN		Austin Peay	W 96–68	1–0	UD Arena (13,121); Dayton, OH
Nov 15, 2016*; 1:15 pm, ESPN2		at Alabama; College Hoops Tip-Off Marathon	W 77–72	2–0	Coleman Coliseum (10,834); Tuscaloosa, AL
Nov 19, 2016*; 2:00 pm, FSOH		No. 17 Saint Mary's	L 57–61	2–1	UD Arena (13,175); Dayton, OH
Nov 24, 2016*; 8:30 pm, ESPNU		vs. Nebraska; Wooden Legacy quarterfinals	L 78–80	2–2	Titan Gym (3,816); Fullerton, CA
Nov 25, 2016*; 9:30 pm, ESPN3		vs. Portland; Wooden Legacy 2nd round consolation	W 84–74	3–2	Titan Gym (5,153); Fullerton, CA
Nov 27, 2016*; 2:00 pm, ESPNU		vs. New Mexico; Wooden Legacy 5th place game	W 64–57	4–2	Honda Center; Anaheim, CA
Dec 3, 2016*; 2:00 pm, FSOH		Winthrop	W 83–67	5–2	UD Arena (12,708); Dayton, OH
Dec 6, 2016*; 7:00 pm, TWCSC		Saint Joseph's (IN)	W 91–59	6–2	UD Arena (12,495); Dayton, OH
Dec 10, 2016*; 2:00 pm, FSOH		East Tennessee State	W 75–61	7–2	UD Arena (13,017); Dayton, OH
Dec 17, 2016*; 7:00 pm, BTN		vs. Northwestern; State Farm Chicago Legends	L 64–67	7–3	United Center; Chicago, IL
Dec 21, 2016*; 7:00 pm, TWCSC		Vanderbilt	W 68–63	8–3	UD Arena (12,828); Dayton, OH
Dec 23, 2016; 7:00 pm, TWCSC		VMI	W 92–56	9–3	UD Arena (12,612); Dayton, OH
Atlantic 10 regular season
Dec 30, 2016; 6:00 pm, CBSSN		La Salle	W 66-55	10–3 (1–0)	UD Arena (12,963); Dayton, OH
Jan 3, 2017; 8:00 pm, ASN		St. Bonaventure	W 90-74	11–3 (2–0)	Reilly Center (3,328); Saint Bonaventure, NY
Jan 6, 2017; 7:00 pm, ESPN2		Rhode Island	W 67–64	12–3 (3–0)	UD Arena (12,883); Dayton, OH
Jan 11, 2017; 7:00 pm, CBSSN		at Massachusetts	L 55–67	12–4 (3–1)	Mullins Center (2,628); Amherst, MA
Jan 14, 2017; 12:00 pm, CBSSN		at Duquesne	W 76–57	13–4 (4–1)	PPG Paints Arena (3,132); Pittsburgh, PA
Jan 19, 2017; 7:00 pm, ESPNU		Richmond	W 75–59	14–4 (5–1)	UD Arena (13,133); Dayton, OH
Jan 22, 2017; 2:00 pm, CBSSN		Saint Louis	W 67–46	15–4 (6–1)	UD Arena (13,338); Dayton, OH
Jan 27, 2017; 9:00 pm, ESPN2		at VCU	L 68–73	15–5 (6–2)	Siegel Center (7,637); Richmond, VA
Feb 1, 2017; 9:00 pm, CBSSN		at Fordham	W 75–66	16–5 (7–2)	Rose Hill Gymnasium (2,412); Bronx, NY
Feb 4, 2017; 12:30 pm, NBCSN		Duquesne	W 90–53	17–5 (8–2)	UD Arena (13,455); Dayton, OH
Feb 7, 2016; 8:00 pm, ASN		Saint Joseph's	W 77–70	18–5 (9–2)	UD Arena (12,612); Dayton, OH
Feb 10, 2017; 7:00 pm, ESPN2		at Rhode Island	W 75–74	19–5 (10–2)	Ryan Center (7,394); Kingston, RI
Feb 14, 2017; 8:00 pm, CBSSN		at Saint Louis	W 85–63	20–5 (11–2)	Chaifetz Arena (5,082); St. Louis, MO
Feb 18, 2017; 2:00 pm, NBCSN		St. Bonaventure	W 76–72	21–5 (12–2)	UD Arena (13,455); Dayton, OH
Feb 21, 2017; 7:00 pm, TWCSC		George Mason	W 83–70	22–5 (13–2)	UD Arena (13,071); Dayton, OH
Feb 24, 2017; 9:00 pm, ESPN2		at Davidson	W 89–82	23–5 (14–2)	John M. Belk Arena; Davidson, NC
Mar 1, 2017; 8:00 pm, CBSSN		VCU	W 79–72	24–5 (15–2)	UD Arena (13,455); Dayton, OH
Mar 4, 2017; 8:00 pm, CBSSN		at George Washington	L 81–87	24–6 (15–3)	Charles E. Smith Center (4,143); Washington, D.C.
Atlantic 10 tournament
Mar 10, 2017; 12:00 pm, NBCSN	(1)	vs. (9) Davidson; Quarterfinals	L 67–73	24–7	PPG Paints Arena (6,641); Pittsburgh, PA
NCAA tournament
Mar 17, 2017*; 7:10 pm, CBS	(7 S)	vs. (10 S) No. 19 Wichita State; First Round	L 58–64	24–8	Bankers Life Fieldhouse (18,269); Indianapolis, IN
*Non-conference game. ^{#}Rankings from AP Poll. (#) Tournament seedings in parentheses. S=South Region. All times are in Eastern Time.
