= 2016–17 Richmond Spiders men's basketball team =

American college basketball season

2016–17 Richmond Spiders men's basketball

NIT, Quarterfinals
- Conference: Atlantic 10 Conference
- Record: 22–13 (13–5 A-10)
- Head coach: Chris Mooney (12th season)
- Assistant coaches: Rob Jones (9th season); Kim Lewis (4th season); Marcus Jenkins (2nd season)
- Home arena: Robins Center

2016–17 Atlantic 10 men's basketball standings
	Conf.				Overall
Team	W		L	PCT	W		L	PCT
Dayton	15	–	3	.833	24	–	8	.750
VCU	14	–	4	.778	26	–	9	.743
Rhode Island †	13	–	5	.722	25	–	10	.714
Richmond	13	–	5	.722	22	–	13	.629
Saint Bonaventure	11	–	7	.611	20	–	12	.625
George Washington	10	–	8	.556	20	–	15	.571
George Mason	9	–	9	.500	20	–	14	.588
La Salle	9	–	9	.500	15	–	15	.500
Davidson	8	–	10	.444	17	–	15	.531
Fordham	7	–	11	.389	13	–	19	.406
Saint Louis	6	–	12	.333	12	–	21	.364
UMass	4	–	14	.222	15	–	18	.455
Saint Joseph's	4	–	14	.222	11	–	20	.355
Duquesne	3	–	15	.167	10	–	22	.313
† 2017 A10 Tournament winner

The 2016–17 Richmond Spiders men's basketball team represented the University of Richmond during the 2016–17 NCAA Division I men's basketball season. Richmond competed as a member of the Atlantic 10 Conference under 12th-year head coach Chris Mooney and played its home games at the Robins Center. They finished the regular season 19–11, 13–5 in A-10 play to finish in a tie for third place. Due to tiebreaking rules, they received the No. 3 seed in the A-10 tournament, where they defeated George Washington in the quarterfinals before losing to VCU in the semifinals. They received an invitation to the National Invitation Tournament, where, as No. 6 seed in the Iowa bracket, defeated No. 3 seed Alabama and No. 7 seed Oakland before falling to No. 4 seed TCU in the quarterfinals.

== Previous season ==
The Spiders finished the 2015–16 season with a record of 16–16, 7–11 in A-10 play to finish in ninth place. They defeated Fordham in the second round of the A-10 tournament to advance to the Quarterfinals where they lost to Dayton.

== Preseason ==
Richmond was picked to finish in sixth place in the Preseason A-10 poll. T. J. Cline was selected to the Preseason All-Conference First Team while ShawnDre’ Jones was named to the Third Team.

== Departures ==
Name	Number	Pos.	Height	Weight	Year	Hometown	Notes
Trey Davis	5	G/F	6'5"	215	RS Senior	Richmond, Virginia	Graduated
Deion Taylor	11	F	6'7"	215	Senior	New Orleans, Louisiana	Graduated
John Moran	13	G	6'3"	185	Senior	Phoenixville, Pennsylvania	Walk-on; graduated
Terry Allen	15	F	6'8"	240	Senior	Houston, Texas	Graduated
KoVien Dominaus	35	F	6'7"	170	Freshman	Columbus, Ohio	Transferred

=== Incoming transfers ===
Name	Number	Pos.	Height	Weight	Year	Hometown	Previous School
Kwesi Abakah	34	F	6'8"	212	RS Senior	Suwanee, Georgia	Graduate transfer from Northeastern, eligible immediately

== Recruiting ==
College recruiting
Name	Hometown	School	Height	Weight	Commit date
Nick Sherod #36 SG	Richmond, Virginia	St. Christopher's School	6 ft 1 in (1.85 m)	180 lb (82 kg)	Jul 31, 2015
Nick Sherod #36 SG	Recruit ratings: Scout: Rivals: (79)				
De'Monte Buckingham #50 SF	Henrico, Virginia	Henrico High School	6 ft 4 in (1.93 m)	185 lb (84 kg)	Jul 29, 2015
De'Monte Buckingham #50 SF	Recruit ratings: Scout: Rivals: (74)				
Grant Golden #66 PF	Middleton, Virginia	St. James School	6 ft 8 in (2.03 m)	205 lb (93 kg)	Sep 15, 2015
Grant Golden #66 PF	Recruit ratings: Scout: Rivals: (70)				
Solly Stansbury; SF	Paris, France	Paris-Levallois Basket	6 ft 7 in (2.01 m)	200 lb (91 kg)	
Solly Stansbury; SF	Recruit ratings: Scout: Rivals: (NR)				
Overall recruit ranking: Scout: NR Rivals: NR ESPN: NR
Note: In many cases, Scout, Rivals, 247Sports, On3, and ESPN may conflict in their listings of height and weight.; In these cases, the average was taken. ESPN grades are on a 100-point scale.; Sources: "Rivals.com 2016 Richmond Commitments". Rivals.; "Scout.com 2016 Richmond Commitments". Scout.; "ESPN 2016 Richmond Commitments". ESPN.; "Scout.com Team Recruiting Rankings". Scout.; "2016 Team Ranking". Rivals.

=== Recruiting Class of 2017 ===
College recruiting (2017)
Name	Hometown	School	Height	Weight	Commit date
Tomas Verbinskis #71 SF	Weston, Florida	The Sagemont School	6 ft 6 in (1.98 m)	180 lb (82 kg)	Oct 21, 2016
Tomas Verbinskis #71 SF	Recruit ratings: Scout: Rivals: (72)				
Bryce Schneider; SG	Myrtle Beach, South Carolina	Myrtle Beach High School	6 ft 5 in (1.96 m)	175 lb (79 kg)	Oct 16, 2015
Bryce Schneider; SG	Recruit ratings: Scout: Rivals: (NR)				
Jacob Gilyard; PG	Kansas City, Missouri	The Barstow School	5 ft 10 in (1.78 m)	150 lb (68 kg)	Sep 12, 2016
Jacob Gilyard; PG	Recruit ratings: Scout: Rivals: (NR)				
Nathan Cayo; SG	Montreal, Quebec	College Jean-De-Brebeuf	6 ft 7 in (2.01 m)	200 lb (91 kg)	Oct 13, 2016
Nathan Cayo; SG	Recruit ratings: Scout: Rivals: (NR)				
AJ Ford; SF	Saint Petersburg, Florida	Saint Petersburg High School	6 ft 8 in (2.03 m)	210 lb (95 kg)	Nov 7, 2016
AJ Ford; SF	Recruit ratings: Scout: Rivals: (NR)				
Overall recruit ranking: Scout: NR Rivals: NR ESPN: NR
Note: In many cases, Scout, Rivals, 247Sports, On3, and ESPN may conflict in their listings of height and weight.; In these cases, the average was taken. ESPN grades are on a 100-point scale.; Sources: "Rivals.com 2017 Richmond Commitments". Rivals.; "Scout.com 2017 Richmond Commitments". Scout.; "ESPN 2017 Richmond Commitments". ESPN.; "Scout.com Team Recruiting Rankings". Scout.; "2017 Team Ranking". Rivals.

== Roster ==
2016–17 Richmond Spiders men's basketball team
Players
Coaches

Pos.	#	Name	Height	Weight	Year	Previous school	Hometown
G	1	Joe Kirby	6 ft 1 in (1.85 m)	205 lb (93 kg)	Jr	Sagemont School	Pines, Florida
G	2	Khwan Fore	6 ft 0 in (1.83 m)	175 lb (79 kg)	So	Lee High School	Huntsville, Alabama
G	3	ShawnDre' Jones	6 ft 0 in (1.83 m)	165 lb (75 kg)	Sr	George Bush High School	Houston, Texas
G	4	Keith Oddo (W)	6 ft 1 in (1.85 m)	185 lb (84 kg)	So	North Cross School	Roanoke, Virginia
G	5	Nick Sherod	6 ft 4 in (1.93 m)	220 lb (100 kg)	Fr	St. Christopher's School	Richmond, Virginia
F/C	10	T. J. Cline	6 ft 9 in (2.06 m)	230 lb (104 kg)	RS Sr	Niagara	Plano, Texas
G	11	De'Monte Buckingham	6 ft 4 in (1.93 m)	215 lb (98 kg)	Fr	Henrico High School	Richmond, Virginia
F	12	Chase Fletcher (W)	6 ft 7 in (2.01 m)	220 lb (100 kg)	Sr	Highland Park High School	Dallas, Texas
F	13	Solly Stansbury (I)	6 ft 7 in (2.01 m)	225 lb (102 kg)	RS So	Toms River High School North	Toms River, New Jersey
G	15	Niko King (W)	6 ft 3 in (1.91 m)	190 lb (86 kg)	RS Fr	Virginia Union	Landover, Maryland
F	24	Marshall Wood	6 ft 8 in (2.03 m)	215 lb (98 kg)	RS Sr	Virginia Tech	Rustburg, Virginia
G	30	Jesse Pistokache	6 ft 3 in (1.91 m)	205 lb (93 kg)	So	Johnson Ferry Christian Academy	Mission, Texas
G	32	Julius Johnson	6 ft 3 in (1.91 m)	185 lb (84 kg)	So	Florida Air Academy	Cocoa, Florida
F/C	33	Grant Golden	6 ft 9 in (2.06 m)	240 lb (109 kg)	Fr	St. James School	Winchester, Virginia
F	34	Kwesi Abakah	6 ft 8 in (2.03 m)	215 lb (98 kg)	GS	Northeastern	Suwanee, Georgia
F	44	Paul Friendshuh	6 ft 10 in (2.08 m)	240 lb (109 kg)	So	New Prague High School	New Prague, Minnesota

Head coach

- Chris Mooney (Princeton)

Assistant coach(es)

- Rob Jones (Toccoa Falls)
- Kim Lewis (Tulane)
- Marcus Jenkins (Air Force)

Legend

- (C) Team captain
- (S) Suspended
- (I) Ineligible
- (W) Walk-on
- Injured
- Current redshirt

Roster

== Schedule and results ==
Date time, TV	Rank^{#}	Opponent^{#}	Result	Record	High points	High rebounds	High assists	Site (attendance) city, state
Non-conference regular season
Nov 11, 2016*; 7:00 pm, CBS 6.2		VMI	W 72–69	1–0	31 – Jones	9 – Sherod	5 – Cline	Robins Center (7,201); Richmond, Virginia
Nov 14, 2016*; 7:00 pm, CSNMA+		Old Dominion	L 61–64	1–1	23 – Jones	6 – Cline	7 – Cline	Robins Center (5,028); Richmond, Virginia
Nov 20, 2016*; 1:30 pm, CSNMA+		Robert Morris; Barclays Center Classic	W 81–69	2–1	18 – Cline	9 – Cline	5 – Cline	Robins Center (4,768); Richmond, Virginia
Nov 22, 2016* noon, CSNMA		Hampton; Barclays Center Classic	W 65–52	3–1	17 – Cline	7 – Tied	5 – Cline	Robins Center (6,094); Richmond, Virginia
Nov 25, 2016*; 9:30 pm, ASN		vs. Maryland; Barclays Center Classic semifinals	L 82–88 ^{OT}	3–2	23 – Jones	9 – Tied	9 – Cline	Barclays Center; Brooklyn, New York
Nov 26, 2016*; 7:00 pm, ASN		vs. Boston College; Barclays Center Classic 3rd place game	W 67–54	4–2	23 – Cline	10 – Cline	2 – Tied	Barclays Center; Brooklyn, New York
Nov 30, 2016*; 7:00 pm, CBS 6.3		at Bucknell	L 68–73	4–3	22 – Cline	8 – Tied	4 – Tied	Sojka Pavilion (2,494); Lewisburg, Pennsylvania
Dec 3, 2016* noon, ESPNU		Wake Forest	L 67–75	4–4	20 – Cline	7 – Johnson	8 – Cline	Robins Center (6,705); Richmond, Virginia
Dec 10, 2016*; 7:30 pm, CSNMA+		UMBC	W 78–75	5–4	19 – Jones	9 – Tied	6 – Jones	Robins Center (5,552); Richmond, Virginia
Dec 17, 2016*; 12:30 pm, ESPNU		Texas Tech	L 72–79	5–5	19 – Fore	9 – Cline	7 – Fore	Robins Center (6,703); Richmond, Virginia
Dec 20, 2016*; 7:00 pm		at James Madison	W 75–55	6–5	21 – Cline	11 – Cline	6 – Jones	JMU Convocation Center (2,383); Harrisonburg, Virginia
Dec 23, 2016*; 4:00 pm		at Oral Roberts	L 72–87	6–6	25 – Cline	14 – Cline	6 – Tied	Mabee Center (2,735); Tulsa, Oklahoma
Atlantic 10 regular season
Dec 31, 2016; 2:00 pm, ASN		at Davidson	W 82–80	7–6 (1–0)	21 – Jones	10 – Cline	8 – Cline	John M. Belk Arena (4,249); Davidson, North Carolina
Jan 4, 2017; 7:00 pm, CBS 6.1		Fordham	W 80–72	8–6 (2–0)	22 – Buckingham	5 – Cline	8 – Jones	Robins Center (5,004); Richmond, Virginia
Jan 8, 2017 noon, NBCSN		at George Washington	W 77–70	9–6 (3–0)	19 – Cline	11 – Cline	7 – Cline	Charles E. Smith Center (2,986); Washington, D.C.
Jan 11, 2017; 7:00 pm, CBS 6.3		St. Bonaventure	W 78–61	10–6 (4–0)	18 – Buckingham	13 – Buckingham	5 – Tied	Robins Center (6,058); Richmond, Virginia
Jan 14, 2017; 12:30 pm, NBCSN		at Saint Joseph's	W 70–66	11–6 (5–0)	21 – Jones	10 – Cline	9 – Cline	Hagan Arena (4,051); Philadelphia, Pennsylvania
Jan 19, 2017; 7:00 pm, ESPNU		at Dayton	L 59–75	11–7 (5–1)	21 – Cline	11 – Buckingham	6 – Jones	University of Dayton Arena (13,103); Dayton, Ohio
Jan 22, 2017; 1:00 pm, ASN		George Mason	L 77–82	11–8 (5–2)	21 – Cline	11 – Cline	6 – Jones	Robins Center (7,201); Richmond, Virginia
Jan 25, 2017; 8:00 pm, CBSSN		Rhode Island	W 73–62	12–8 (6–2)	21 – Cline	13 – Cline	4 – Tied	Robins Center (5,545); Richmond, Virginia
Jan 28, 2017; 6:00 pm, CSNMA+		Duquesne	W 101–90	13–8 (7–2)	34 – Cline	12 – Cline	11 – Cline	Robins Center (7,201); Richmond, Virginia
Feb 1, 2017; 7:00 pm, CBSSN		at VCU; Capital City Classic	L 74–81	13–9 (7–3)	30 – Jones	8 – Buckingham	8 – Cline	Siegel Center (7,637); Richmond, Virginia
Feb 4, 2017; 2:30 pm, NBCSN		George Washington	W 84–75	14–9 (8–3)	26 – Cline	13 – Cline	5 – Jones	Robins Center (7,201); Richmond, Virginia
Feb 11, 2017; 2:00 pm		at La Salle	W 64–52	15–9 (9–3)	21 – Cline	9 – Buckingham	7 – Cline	Tom Gola Arena (3,400); Philadelphia, Pennsylvania
Feb 14, 2017; 7:00 pm, MASN		at George Mason	L 70–93	15–10 (9–4)	21 – Cline	6 – Cline	6 – Jones	EagleBank Arena (3,004); Fairfax, Virginia
Feb 17, 2017; 9:00 pm, ESPN2		VCU; Capital City Classic	L 73–84	15–11 (9–5)	20 – Jones	9 – Cline	7 – Cline	Robins Center (7,201); Richmond, Virginia
Feb 21, 2017; 8:00 pm, CBSSN		Davidson	W 84–76	16–11 (10–5)	18 – Tied	6 – Cline	8 – Cline	Robins Center (6,199); Richmond, Virginia
Feb 25, 2017; 2:30 pm, NBCSN		at Fordham	W 70–48	17–11 (11–5)	19 – Buckingham	7 – Tied	12 – Fore	Rose Hill Gymnasium (3,023); Bronx, New York
Mar 1, 2017; 7:00 pm		at Massachusetts	W 75–64	18–11 (12–5)	26 – Jones	3 – Tied	8 – Buckingham	William D. Mullins Memorial Center (2,434); Amherst, Massachusetts
Mar 4, 2017; 4:00 pm, CSNMA+		Saint Louis	W 72–62	19–11 (13–5)	23 – Buckingham	11 – Cline	12 – Cline	Robins Center (7,201); Richmond, Virginia
Atlantic 10 tournament
Mar 10, 2017; 8:30 pm, NBCSN	(3)	vs. (6) George Washington; Quarterfinals	W 70–67	20–11	19 – Jones	7 – Fore	8 – Cline	PPG Paints Arena (6,647); Pittsburgh, Pennsylvania
Mar 11, 2017; 3:30 pm, CBSSN	(3)	vs. (2) VCU; Semifinals	L 77–87 ^{OT}	20–12	26 – Buckingham	9 – Fore	5 – Fore	PPG Paints Arena (6,886); Pittsburgh, Pennsylvania
NIT
Mar 14, 2017*; 9:15 pm, ESPN2	(6)	at (3) Alabama; First Round – Iowa Bracket	W 71–64	21–12	22 – Jones	6 – Cline	4 – Fore	Coleman Coliseum (4,041); Tuscaloosa, Alabama
Mar 19, 2017*; 7:30 pm, ESPNU	(6)	(7) Oakland; Second Round – Iowa Bracket	W 87–83	22–12	25 – Cline	9 – Cline	6 – Cline	Robins Center (6,527); Richmond, Virginia
Mar 21, 2017*; 7:00 pm, ESPN2	(6)	at (4) TCU; Quarterfinals – Iowa Bracket	L 68–86	22–13	33 – Cline	7 – Cline	6 – Cline	Schollmaier Arena (5,946); Fort Worth, Texas
*Non-conference game. ^{#}Rankings from AP Poll. (#) Tournament seedings in parentheses. All times are in Eastern Time.
