= Amir Khan (basketball) =

American basketball student-manager

LSU Tigers
- Position: Manager
- League: SEC

Personal information
- Born: c. 2002/2003

Career history

Coaching
- 2022–2025: McNeese (manager)
- 2025: NC State (manager)
- 2025–2026: McNeese (manager)
- 2026–present: LSU (manager)

Amir Khan born (c. 2002/2003) is an American student-manager for the LSU men's basketball team. Nicknamed Aura, in 2025 he became the first student-manager to get a name, image and likeness (NIL) deal.

Khan became a student-manager for the McNeese men's basketball team during the 2022–2023 season. He gained notoriety during the 2024–2025 season for his tunnel walkouts with McNeese, earning more than 20 NIL deals in the process.

After the season, he followed coach Will Wade to NC State but returned in December to McNeese as most of his credits were not accepted at NC State, which would have pushed him back to being a sophomore instead of a senior.

In 2026, he joined Wade at LSU, becoming their student-manager.
