= 2016–17 George Washington Colonials men's basketball team =

American college basketball season

2016–17 George Washington Colonials men's basketball

CBI, Quarterfinals
- Conference: Atlantic 10 Conference
- Record: 20–15 (10–8 A-10)
- Head coach: Maurice Joseph (interim)
- Assistant coaches: Hajj Turner; Carmen Maciariello
- Home arena: Charles E. Smith Center

2016–17 Atlantic 10 men's basketball standings
	Conf.				Overall
Team	W		L	PCT	W		L	PCT
Dayton	15	–	3	.833	24	–	8	.750
VCU	14	–	4	.778	26	–	9	.743
Rhode Island †	13	–	5	.722	25	–	10	.714
Richmond	13	–	5	.722	22	–	13	.629
Saint Bonaventure	11	–	7	.611	20	–	12	.625
George Washington	10	–	8	.556	20	–	15	.571
George Mason	9	–	9	.500	20	–	14	.588
La Salle	9	–	9	.500	15	–	15	.500
Davidson	8	–	10	.444	17	–	15	.531
Fordham	7	–	11	.389	13	–	19	.406
Saint Louis	6	–	12	.333	12	–	21	.364
UMass	4	–	14	.222	15	–	18	.455
Saint Joseph's	4	–	14	.222	11	–	20	.355
Duquesne	3	–	15	.167	10	–	22	.313
† 2017 A10 Tournament winner

The 2016–17 George Washington Colonials men's basketball team represented George Washington University during the 2016–17 NCAA Division I men's basketball season. The Colonials were led by interim head coach Maurice Joseph. They played their home games at the Charles E. Smith Center in Washington, D.C. as members of the Atlantic 10 Conference.

Head coach Mike Lonergan was fired on September 17, 2016, after the school concluded a two-month investigation into alleged emotional abuse against his players. Maurice Joseph was named interim head coach on September 27.

They finished the regular season 20–15, 10–8 in A-10 play to finish in sixth place. They defeated Saint Louis in the second round of the A-10 tournament before losing in the quarterfinals to Richmond. They were invited to the College Basketball Invitational where they defeated Toledo in the first round before losing in the quarterfinals to UIC.

On March 27, 2017, the school removed the interim tag and named Joseph full-time head coach.

== Previous season ==
The Colonials finished the 2015–16 season with a record of 28–10, 11–7 in A–10 play to finish in fifth place. In the A–10 Tournament, the Colonials defeated Saint Louis before losing to Saint Joseph's in the quarterfinals. The Colonials received a bid to the National Invitation Tournament and defeated Hofstra, Monmouth, and Florida to advance to the NIT semifinals at Madison Square Garden. There, they defeated San Diego State by 20 points to advance to the championship game. In the championships game, the Colonials defeated Valparaiso 76–60 to win the NIT Championship.

== Offseason ==
=== Departures ===
Name	Number	Pos.	Height	Weight	Year	Hometown	Notes
Matt Cimino	45	F	6'10"	213	Sophomore	Falmouth, ME	Transferred to American
Patricio Garino	13	G	6'6"	208	Senior	Mar del Plata, Argentina	Graduated
Paul Jorgensen	3	G	6'2"	183	Sophomore	New York, NY	Transferred to Butler
Kevin Larsen	21	F	6'10"	260	Senior	Copenhagen, Denmark	Graduated
Joe McDonald	22	G	6'1"	194	Senior	Lorton, VA	Graduated
Alex Mitola	1	G	5'11"	170	GS Senior	Florham Park, NJ	Graduated
Anthony Swan	4	G	6'7"	190	Sophomore	Los Angeles, CA	Transferred to Cal State Northridge

=== Incoming transfers ===
Name	Number	Pos.	Height	Weight	Year	Hometown	Previous School
Patrick Steeves	10	F	6'7"	220	Senior	Montreal, QE	Transferred from Harvard. Will be eligible to play immediately since Steeves graduated from Harvard.

=== 2016 recruiting class ===
College recruiting information
Name	Hometown	School	Height	Weight	Commit date
Kevin Marfo; C	Oradell, NJ	Worcester Academy	6 ft 8 in (2.03 m)	235 lb (107 kg)	Oct 9, 2015
Kevin Marfo; C	Recruit ratings: Scout: Rivals: 247Sports: ESPN: (78)				
Darnell Rogers; PG	Snellville, Georgia	Shiloh High School	5 ft 3 in (1.60 m)	145 lb (66 kg)	Oct 6, 2015
Darnell Rogers; PG	Recruit ratings: Scout: Rivals: 247Sports: ESPN: (73)				
Jair Bolden; CG	Brooklyn, NY	Westtown School	6 ft 4 in (1.93 m)	190 lb (86 kg)	Oct 26, 2015
Jair Bolden; CG	Recruit ratings: Scout: Rivals: 247Sports: ESPN: (64)				
Arnaldo Toro; PF/C	Newark, NJ	Saint Benedict's Prep	6 ft 8 in (2.03 m)	235 lb (107 kg)	Nov 5, 2015
Arnaldo Toro; PF/C	Recruit ratings: Scout: Rivals: 247Sports: ESPN: (73)				
Collin Smith; C	Jacksonville, FL	Bolles School	6 ft 10 in (2.08 m)	225 lb (102 kg)	Jun 16, 2015
Collin Smith; C	Recruit ratings: Scout: Rivals: 247Sports: ESPN: (NR)				
Justin Williams; SG	Severn, MD	Annapolis Area Christian School	6 ft 4 in (1.93 m)	197 lb (89 kg)	May 1, 2016
Justin Williams; SG	Recruit ratings: Scout: Rivals: 247Sports: ESPN: (NR)				
Overall recruit ranking:
Note: In many cases, Scout, Rivals, 247Sports, On3, and ESPN may conflict in their listings of height and weight.; In these cases, the average was taken. ESPN grades are on a 100-point scale.; Sources: "George Washington 2016 Player Commits". ESPN.; "2016 Team Ranking". Rivals.

== Roster ==
2016–17 George Washington Colonials men's basketball team
Players
Coaches

Pos.	#	Name	Height	Weight	Year	Previous school	Hometown
G	3	Jair Bolden	6 ft 4 in (1.93 m)	205 lb (93 kg)	Fr	Westtown School	Brooklyn, New York
G	4	Justin Williams	6 ft 3 in (1.91 m)	215 lb (98 kg)	Fr	Annapolis Area Christian School	Severn, Maryland
G	5	Adam Mitola	6 ft 3 in (1.91 m)	205 lb (93 kg)	Fr	Gill St. Bernard's School	Florham Park, New Jersey
G/F	10	Patrick Steeves	6 ft 7 in (2.01 m)	232 lb (105 kg)	Sr	The Hotchkiss School; Harvard	Montreal, Quebec, Canada
F/C	11	Arnaldo Toro	6 ft 9 in (2.06 m)	245 lb (111 kg)	Fr	St. Benedict's Prep	Hormigueros, Puerto Rico
G	12	Yuta Watanabe	6 ft 8 in (2.03 m)	196 lb (89 kg)	Jr	St. Thomas More School (CT)	Miki, Kagawa, Japan
G	14	Jordan Roland	6 ft 1 in (1.85 m)	171 lb (78 kg)	So	Westhill Senior High School	Syracuse, New York
C	15	Collin Smith	6 ft 10 in (2.08 m)	240 lb (109 kg)	Fr	The Bolles School	Jacksonville, Florida
G	23	Jaren Sina	6 ft 2 in (1.88 m)	187 lb (85 kg)	RS Jr	Gill St. Bernard's School; Seton Hall	Lake Hopatcong, New Jersey
G	30	Matt Hart (W)	6 ft 1 in (1.85 m)	182 lb (83 kg)	RS Sr	Canisius High School; Hamilton College	Orchard Park, New York
F	33	Collin Goss	6 ft 11 in (2.11 m)	227 lb (103 kg)	So	St. Stephen's & St. Agnes School	Manassas, Virginia
F	34	Tyler Cavanaugh	6 ft 9 in (2.06 m)	243 lb (110 kg)	RS Sr	Jamesville-DeWitt High School; Wake Forest	Syracuse, New York
F	40	Kevin Marfo	6 ft 9 in (2.06 m)	245 lb (111 kg)	Fr	Worcester Academy	Bergenfield, New Jersey

Head coach

- Maurice Joseph (Interim) (Vermont)

Assistant coach(es)

- Hajj Turner (Louisville)
- Carmen Maciariello (Siena)

Legend

- (C) Team captain
- (S) Suspended
- (I) Ineligible
- (W) Walk-on
- Injured
- Current redshirt

Roster

== Schedule and results ==
Date time, TV	Rank^{#}	Opponent^{#}	Result	Record	High points	High rebounds	High assists	Site (attendance) city, state
Japanese exhibition tour
8/13/16*; 4:00 am		vs. Japan national team	W 81–66		27 – Cavanaugh	9 – Tied	4 – Sina	Fumin Kyosai Super Arena; Osaka, Japan
8/16/16*; 7:00 am		vs. Japan national team	W 77–71		23 – Cavanaugh	10 – Watanabe	2 – Hart	Ryōgoku Kokugikan; Sumida, Tokyo, Japan
8/19/16*; 6:00 am		vs. Japan national team	W 75–47		13 – Sina	6 – Steeves	2 – Tied	Hamamatsu Arena; Hamamatsu, Japan
8/21/16*; 12:30 am		at Ryukyu Golden Kings	W 82–58		15 – Tied	10 – Cavanaugh	3 – Cavanaugh	Okinawa City Gymnasium; Okinawa City, Japan
Exhibition
11/05/16*; 3:00 pm		Bowie State	W 86–80		19 – Watanabe	13 – Cavanaugh	5 – Cavanaugh	Charles E. Smith Center (2,238); Washington, D.C.
Non-conference regular season
11/11/2016*; 4:00 pm		Maryland Eastern Shore	W 75–71	1–0	21 – Cavanaugh	10 – Cavanaugh	4 – Sina	Charles E. Smith Center (3,256); Washington, D.C.
11/15/2016*; 7:00 pm		Siena; CBE Hall of Fame Classic	W 77–75	2–0	16 – Sina	12 – Watanabe	5 – Cavanaugh	Charles E. Smith Center (2,224); Washington, D.C.
11/17/2016*; 7:00 pm		Arkansas-Pine Bluff; CBE Hall of Fame Classic	W 61–41	3–0	18 – Cavanaugh	10 – Cavanaugh	3 – Cavanaugh	Charles E. Smith Center (2,013); Washington, D.C.
11/21/2016*; 7:00 pm, ESPNU		vs. Georgia; CBE Hall of Fame Classic semifinals	L 73–81	3–1	21 – Cavanaugh	6 – Cavanaugh	5 – Sina	Sprint Center (3,527); Kansas City, MO
11/22/2016*; 7:30 pm, ESPN3		vs. UAB; CBE Hall of Fame Classic third-place game	L 74–81	3–2	19 – Cavanaugh	9 – Cavanaugh	3 – Hart	Sprint Center (12,147); Kansas City, MO
11/26/2016*; 4:00 pm		Penn State	L 68–74	3–3	15 – Cavanaugh	5 – 3 Tied	3 – 3 Tied	Charles E. Smith Center (2,378); Washington, D.C.
11/29/2016*; 7:00 pm		at Harvard	W 77–74	4–3	20 – Cavanaugh	10 – Toro	3 – Cavanaugh	Lavietes Pavilion (1,406); Cambridge, MA
12/03/2016*; 2:00 pm		South Florida	W 68–67	5–3	22 – Smith	9 – Toro	3 – Bolden	Charles E. Smith Center (2,288); Washington, D.C.
12/04/2016*; 4:00 pm, CBSSN		vs. Florida State; BB&T Classic	L 48–67	5–4	18 – Marfo	9 – Tied	2 – 3 Tied	Verizon Center (8,645); Washington, D.C.
12/07/2016*; 7:30 pm, CBSSN		at Temple	W 66–63	6–4	20 – Cavanaugh	9 – Toro	6 – Sina	Liacouras Center (5,016); Philadelphia, PA
12/10/2016*; 4:00 pm		Howard	W 79–62	7–4	20 – Sina	13 – Cavanaugh	6 – Cavanaugh	Charles E. Smith Center (4,338); Washington, D.C.
12/15/2016*; 7:00 pm		UCF	W 74–59	8–4	27 – Roland	8 – Smith	3 – 4 Tied	Charles E. Smith Center (2,891); Washington, D.C.
12/22/2016*; 7:00 pm, ACCN Extra		at Miami (FL)	L 64–72	8–5	15 – Watanabe	10 – Toro	3 – 3 Tied	BankUnited Center (6,871); Coral Gables, FL
Atlantic 10 regular season
12/30/2016; 7:00 pm		at Saint Joseph's	L 63–68	8–6 (0–1)	15 – Sina	13 – Cavanaugh	6 – Toro	Hagan Arena (4,200); Philadelphia, PA
01/05/2017; 7:00 pm		Davidson	W 73–69	9–6 (1–1)	20 – Cavanaugh	7 – Sina	5 – Sina	Charles E. Smith Center (2,823); Washington, D.C.
01/08/2017; 12:00 pm, NBCSN		Richmond	L 70–77	9–7 (1–2)	22 – Cavanaugh	7 – Cavanaugh	4 – Cavanaugh	Charles E. Smith Center (2,986); Washington, D.C.
01/11/2017; 6:00 pm, ESPN2		at VCU	L 55–85	9–8 (1–3)	17 – Watanabe	8 – Smith	2 – Marfo	Siegel Center (7,637); Richmond, VA
01/15/2017; 4:30 pm, NBCSN		at La Salle	L 69–79	9–9 (1–4)	16 – Bolden	8 – Watanabe	5 – Sina	Tom Gola Arena (2,763); Philadelphia, PA
01/18/2017; 7:00 pm		Duquesne	W 65–63	10–9 (2–4)	15 – Watanabe	10 – Cavanaugh	5 – Watanabe	Charles E. Smith Center (2,653); Washington, D.C.
01/25/2017; 7:00 pm, ASN		at George Mason	W 87–68	11–9 (3–4)	20 – Tied	8 – Watanabe	5 – Sina	EagleBank Arena (4,070); Fairfax, VA
01/28/2017; 4:00 pm, ASN		Saint Louis	W 63–55	12–9 (4–4)	18 – Cavanaugh	9 – Watanabe	3 – Watanabe	Charles E. Smith Center (3,193); Washington, D.C.
01/31/2017; 7:00 pm, CBSSN		at Rhode Island	L 70–82	12–10 (4–5)	21 – Cavanaugh	5 – Cavanaugh	4 – Cavanaugh	Ryan Center (5,190); Kingston, RI
02/04/2017; 2:30 pm, NBCSN		at Richmond	L 75–84	12–11 (4–6)	23 – Cavanaugh	10 – Cavanaugh	3 – Sina	Robins Center (7,201); Richmond, VA
02/08/2017; 9:00 pm, CBSSN		VCU	L 53–54	12–12 (4–7)	13 – Cavanaugh	17 – Cavanaugh	4 – Sina	Charles E. Smith Center (4,012); Washington, D.C.
02/11/2017; 4:30 pm, NBCSN		St. Bonaventure	W 76–70	13–12 (5–7)	33 – Cavanaugh	10 – Cavanaugh	6 – Watanabe	Charles E. Smith Center (3,875); Washington, D.C.
02/15/2017; 7:00 pm, ASN		at Davidson	L 63–74	13–13 (5–8)	15 – Tied	9 – Cavanaugh	6 – Sina	John M. Belk Arena (3,715); Davidson, NC
02/19/2017; 12:00 pm, NBCSN		at Duquesne	W 77–70	14–13 (6–8)	19 – Cavanaugh	7 – Cavanaugh	5 – Bolden	Palumbo Center (1,746); Pittsburgh, PA
02/23/2017; 7:00 pm, ASN		Massachusetts	W 83–67	15–13 (7–8)	26 – Steeves	13 – Cavanaugh	5 – Steeves	Charles E. Smith Center (2,654); Washington, D.C.
02/26/2017; 2:00 pm		George Mason	W 83–74	16–13 (8–8)	22 – Cavanaugh	7 – Cavanaugh	6 – Sina	Charles E. Smith Center (3,352); Washington, D.C.
03/01/2017; 7:00 pm		at Fordham	W 67–66	17–13 (9–8)	20 – Cavanaugh	10 – Cavanaugh	4 – Sina	Rose Hill Gymnasium (2,153); Bronx, NY
03/04/2017; 8:00 pm		Dayton	W 87–81	18–13 (10–8)	30 – Cavanaugh	8 – Cavanaugh	5 – Sina	Charles E. Smith Center (4,143); Washington, D.C.
Atlantic 10 tournament
03/09/2017; 8:30 pm, NBCSN	(6)	vs. (13) Saint Louis; Second round	W 53–46	19–13	18 – Watanabe	16 – Cavanaugh	5 – Sina	PPG Paints Arena (5,442); Pittsburgh, PA
03/10/2017; 8:30 pm, NBCSN	(6)	vs. (3) Richmond; Quarterfinals	L 67–70	19–14	23 – Cavanaugh	12 – Cavanaugh	4 – Steeves	PPG Paints Arena (6,647); Pittsburgh, PA
College Basketball Invitational
03/15/2017*; 7:00 pm		Toledo; First round	W 73–69	20–14	29 – Cavanaugh	7 – Tied	3 – Tied	Charles E. Smith Center (1,016); Washington, DC
03/20/2017*; 8:00 pm		at UIC; Quarterfinals	L 71–80	20–15	24 – Cavanaugh	9 – Cavanaugh	5 – Bolden	UIC Pavilion (1,048); Chicago, IL
*Non-conference game. ^{#}Rankings from AP Poll. (#) Tournament seedings in parentheses. All times are in Eastern Time.

== See also ==
- 2016–17 George Washington Colonials women's basketball team
