= Kevin Marfo =

American basketball player

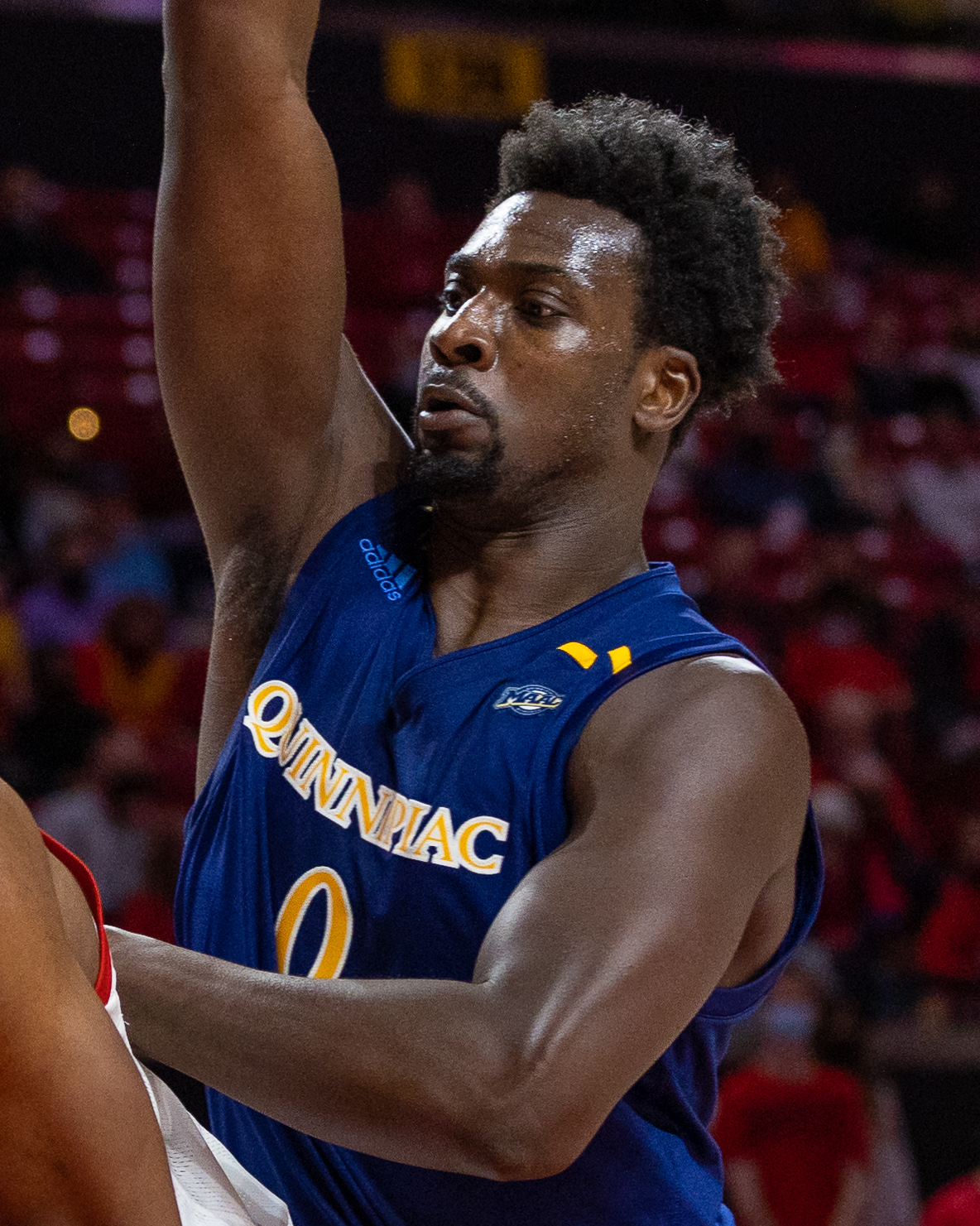
- Marfo with Quinnipiac in 2021

Fortitudo Agrigento
- Position: Power forward
- League: Serie A2

Personal information
- Born: May 26, 1997 (age 29) Brooklyn, New York, U.S.
- Listed height: 6 ft 9 in (2.06 m)
- Listed weight: 247 lb (112 kg)

Career information
- High school: Bergen Catholic (Oradell, New Jersey); Worcester Academy (Worcester, Massachusetts)
- College: George Washington (2016–2017); Quinnipiac (2018–2020); Texas A&M (2020–2021); Quinnipiac (2021–2022)
- NBA draft: 2022: undrafted

Career history
- 2022–present: Fortitudo Agrigento

Career highlights
- NCAA rebounding leader (2020); 2× Second-team All-MAAC (2020, 2022)

Kevin Marfo (born May 26, 1997) is an American professional basketball player for Fortitudo Agrigento in Italy's Serie A2 league. He played college basketball at several universities, including Quinnipiac, George Washington and Texas A&M. He was the NCAA rebounding leader in 2019–20.

== High school career ==
Born in Brooklyn and raised in Bergenfield, New Jersey, Marfo played for Bergen Catholic High School in Oradell, New Jersey, before transferring to Worcester Academy in Worcester, Massachusetts, for his final two high school years. In his senior season, he was team captain and averaged 17 points and 12 rebounds per game. Marfo played for The City AAU team alongside Donovan Mitchell. On October 9, 2015, he committed to George Washington over offers from Providence and Boston College.

== College career ==
As a freshman, Marfo came off the bench for George Washington and averaged 2.7 points and 2.8 rebounds in 8.9 minutes per game. He scored a season-high 18 points on December 4, 2016 in a loss to Florida State. On March 23, 2017, Marfo requested his release from George Washington. He sat out his next season to transfer to Quinnipiac.

As a redshirt sophomore, Marfo averaged 5.4 points and 7.5 rebounds per game. On January 13, 2020, as a junior, Marfo was named Metro Atlantic Athletic Conference (MAAC) Player of the Week after recording a career-high 21 rebounds, along with 13 points and five assists, in a win over Monmouth. He finished the season averaging 13.3 rebounds per game, which led all NCAA Division I players, as well as 10.2 points, 1.9 assists and 1.2 blocks per game. He grabbed at least 10 rebounds in all but one of 30 games. Marfo earned second-team All-MAAC honors.

After his junior season, Marfo announced that was transferring from Quinnipiac. On March 28, 2020, he committed to play for Texas A&M as a senior. He was immediately eligible as a graduate transfer. After the season, Marfo announced that he would return to Quinnipiac. As a sixth-year senior, Marfo averaged a MAAC-best 10.2 rebounds per game to go along with 9.4 points per game, earning a spot on the All-MAAC Second Team for the second time in his career.

== Professional career ==
Marfo went undrafted in the 2022 NBA draft. In July 2022, he signed his first professional contract with Fortitudo Agrigento in Italy's Serie A2 league.

== Career statistics ==
Legend
GP	Games played	GS	Games started	MPG	Minutes per game
FG%	Field goal percentage	3P%	3-point field goal percentage	FT%	Free throw percentage
RPG	Rebounds per game	APG	Assists per game	SPG	Steals per game
BPG	Blocks per game	PPG	Points per game	**Bold**	Career high

=== College ===
*	Led NCAA Division I

Year	Team	GP	GS	MPG	FG%	3P%	FT%	RPG	APG	SPG	BPG	PPG
2016–17	George Washington	23	0	8.9	.364	–	.536	2.8	.2	.3	.3	2.7
2017–18	Quinnipiac	Redshirt										
2018–19	Quinnipiac	25	11	18.5	**.488**	–	.632	7.5	.9	.2	.5	5.4
2019–20	Quinnipiac	30	29	**28.1**	.484	**.333**	.710	**13.3***	1.9	.6	**1.2**	**10.2**
2020–21	Texas A&M	17	8	12.8	.464	.000	.704	3.7	.3	.6	.4	2.6
2021–22	Quinnipiac	**31**	**31**	26.8	.467	.067	**.715**	10.2	**3.9**	**.9**	.7	9.4
Career		126	79	20.3	.467	.105	.676	8.2	1.7	.6	.7	6.7

== Personal life ==
Both of Marfo's parents are originally from Ghana. His father Joseph and mother Sandra are from the cities of Accra and Kumasi, respectively. Marfo has two older sisters, Ashley and Mikita.
