= 2016–17 VCU Rams men's basketball team =

American college basketball season

2016–17 VCU Rams men's basketball

NCAA tournament, First Round
- Conference: Atlantic 10 Conference
- Record: 26–9 (14–4 A-10)
- Head coach: Will Wade (2nd season)
- Assistant coaches: Rasheen Davis; Wes Long; Casey Long
- Home arena: Stuart C. Siegel Center

2016–17 Atlantic 10 men's basketball standings
	Conf.				Overall
Team	W		L	PCT	W		L	PCT
Dayton	15	–	3	.833	24	–	8	.750
VCU	14	–	4	.778	26	–	9	.743
Rhode Island †	13	–	5	.722	25	–	10	.714
Richmond	13	–	5	.722	22	–	13	.629
Saint Bonaventure	11	–	7	.611	20	–	12	.625
George Washington	10	–	8	.556	20	–	15	.571
George Mason	9	–	9	.500	20	–	14	.588
La Salle	9	–	9	.500	15	–	15	.500
Davidson	8	–	10	.444	17	–	15	.531
Fordham	7	–	11	.389	13	–	19	.406
Saint Louis	6	–	12	.333	12	–	21	.364
UMass	4	–	14	.222	15	–	18	.455
Saint Joseph's	4	–	14	.222	11	–	20	.355
Duquesne	3	–	15	.167	10	–	22	.313
† 2017 A10 Tournament winner

The 2016–17 VCU Rams men's basketball team represented Virginia Commonwealth University during the 2016–17 NCAA Division I men's basketball season. The Rams, led by second-year head coach Will Wade, played their home games at Stuart C. Siegel Center as members of the Atlantic 10 Conference. They finished the season 26–9, 14–4 in A-10 play to finish in second place. In the A-10 tournament, they beat George Mason and Richmond before losing to Rhode Island in the championship game. They received an at-large bid to the NCAA tournament as the No. 10 seed in the West region where they lost in the first round to Saint Mary's.

Following the season, head coach Will Wade left VCU to take the head coaching position at LSU following the firing of Johnny Jones. Wade had served has the head coach for the last two seasons making him VCU's shortest tenured head coach since Benny Dees. On March 21, 2017, the school hired Rice head coach Mike Rhoades, who had served as associate head coach under Shaka Smart from 2009 to 2014.

== Previous season ==
The Rams finished the 2015–16 season with a record of 25–11, 14–4 in A-10 play to finish in a tie for a first-place. In the A-10 tournament, the Rams lost to Saint Joseph's in the championship game. The Rams received an at-large bid to the NCAA tournament where they beat Oregon State in the first round before losing to Oklahoma in the second round.

== Preseason ==
The Rams were picked to finish third in the A-10 preseason poll. Mo Allie-Cox was selected to the All-A-10 second team while JeQuan Lewis was selected to the third team. Cox and Lewis were also selected to the All-Defensive team.

== Offseason ==
=== Departures ===
Name	Number	Pos.	Height	Weight	Year	Hometown	Notes
Jordan Riullano	3	G	5'9"	185	Freshman	Bronx, NY	Walk-on; transferred to SUNY Sullivan
Michael Gilmore	11	F	6'10"	215	Sophomore	Tallahassee, FL	Transferred to Miami (FL)
Gerron Scissum	22	F	6'7"	210	Freshman	Huntsville, AL	Transferred to James Madison
Korey Billbury	24	G	6'4"	210	Senior	Tulsa, OK	Graduated
Melvin Johnson	32	G	6'4"	193	Senior	Bronx, NY	Graduated
Johnathan Nwankwo	33	F	6'9"	245	Freshman	Bronx, NY	Transferred to College of Southern Idaho

=== Incoming transfers ===
Name	Number	Pos.	Height	Weight	Year	Hometown	Previous School
Issac Vann	11	F	6'6"	190	Sophomore	Bridgeport, CT	Transferred from Maine. Under NCAA transfer rules, Vann will have to sit out in the 2016–17 season. Will have three years of eligibility left.

=== 2016 recruiting class ===
College recruiting information
Name	Hometown	School	Height	Weight	Commit date
De'Riante Jenkins; SF	Eutawville, SC	Hargrave Military Academy	6 ft 5 in (1.96 m)	180 lb (82 kg)	Sep 19, 2015
De'Riante Jenkins; SF	Recruit ratings: Scout: Rivals: 247Sports: (83)				
Malik Crowfield; SG	Laplace, LA	Riverside Academy	6 ft 4 in (1.93 m)	190 lb (86 kg)	Jan 21, 2016
Malik Crowfield; SG	Recruit ratings: Scout: Rivals: 247Sports: (76)				
Marquell Fraser; SG	Hamilton, CAN	The Hill Academy	6 ft 4 in (1.93 m)	191 lb (87 kg)	Mar 7, 2016
Marquell Fraser; SG	Recruit ratings: Scout: Rivals: 247Sports: ESPN:				
Overall recruit ranking:
Note: In many cases, Scout, Rivals, 247Sports, On3, and ESPN may conflict in their listings of height and weight.; In these cases, the average was taken. ESPN grades are on a 100-point scale.; Sources: "VCU 2016 Player Commits". ESPN.; "2016 Team Ranking". Rivals.

=== 2017 Recruiting class ===
College recruiting information (2017)
Name	Hometown	School	Height	Weight	40^{‡}	Commit date
Marcus Santos-Silva; PF	Taunton, MA	Vermont Academy	6 ft 7 in (2.01 m)	265 lb (120 kg)	Sep 21, 2016	
Marcus Santos-Silva; PF	Recruit ratings: Scout: Rivals: 247Sports: (73)					
Sean Mobley; PF	Melbourne, FL	Montverde Academy	6 ft 9 in (2.06 m)	225 lb (102 kg)	Sep 25, 2016	
Sean Mobley; PF	Recruit ratings: Scout: Rivals: 247Sports: (80)					
Mayan Kiir; PF	Bradenton, FL	Victory Rock Prep	6 ft 9 in (2.06 m)	220 lb (100 kg)	Nov 14, 2016	
Mayan Kiir; PF	Recruit ratings: Scout: Rivals: 247Sports: (82)					
Overall recruit ranking:
Note: In many cases, Scout, Rivals, 247Sports, On3, and ESPN may conflict in their listings of height and weight.; In these cases, the average was taken. ESPN grades are on a 100-point scale.; Sources: "VCU 2017 Player Commits". ESPN.; "2017 Team Ranking". Rivals.

== Roster ==
2016–17 VCU Rams men's basketball team
Players
Coaches

Pos.	#	Name	Height	Weight	Year	Previous school	Hometown
G	0	De'Riante Jenkins	6 ft 5 in (1.96 m)	185 lb (84 kg)	Fr	Hargrave Military Academy	Eutawville, South Carolina
G	1	JeQuan Lewis	6 ft 1 in (1.85 m)	180 lb (82 kg)	Sr	Dickson County High School	Dickson, Tennessee
G	2	Samir Doughty (redshirt)	6 ft 4 in (1.93 m)	185 lb (84 kg)	RS Fr	Mathematics, Civics and Sciences Charter School	Philadelphia, Pennsylvania
F	4	Justin Tillman	6 ft 7 in (2.01 m)	220 lb (100 kg)	Jr	Pershing High School	Detroit, Michigan
G	5	Doug Brooks	6 ft 4 in (1.93 m)	200 lb (91 kg)	Sr	Lake Wales High School	Lake Wales, Florida
G	10	Jonathan Williams	6 ft 1 in (1.85 m)	185 lb (84 kg)	Jr	St. Benedict's Prep	Richmond, Virginia
F	11	Issac Vann (I)	6 ft 6 in (1.98 m)	190 lb (86 kg)	So	Maine	Bridgeport, Connecticut
F	12	Mo Alie-Cox (redshirt)	6 ft 7 in (2.01 m)	250 lb (113 kg)	RS Sr	Middleburg Academy	Alexandria, Virginia
G	13	Malik Crowfield	6 ft 4 in (1.93 m)	180 lb (82 kg)	Fr	Riverside Academy	LaPlace, Louisiana
G	14	Torey Burston (redshirt)	5 ft 8 in (1.73 m)	180 lb (82 kg)	RS Sr	Trinity Episcopal School	Richmond, Virginia
G	15	Marquell Fraser	6 ft 5 in (1.96 m)	205 lb (93 kg)	Fr	The Hill Academy	Hamilton, Ontario
G/F	20	Jordan Burgess (redshirt)	6 ft 5 in (1.96 m)	225 lb (102 kg)	RS Sr	Benedictine College Preparatory	Midlothian, Virginia
F	23	Ahmed Hamdy-Mohamed	6 ft 9 in (2.06 m)	240 lb (109 kg)	Sr	Lee College	Alexandria, Egypt

Head coach

- Will Wade (Clemson)

Assistant coach(es)

- Rasheen Davis (St. Thomas Aquinas)
- Wes Long (Clemson)
- Casey Long (Chattanooga)

Legend

- (C) Team captain
- (S) Suspended
- (I) Ineligible
- (W) Walk-on
- Injured
- Current redshirt

Roster

== Schedule and results ==
Date time, TV	Rank^{#}	Opponent^{#}	Result	Record	High points	High rebounds	High assists	Site (attendance) city, state
Exhibition
Nov 4, 2016; 7:00 pm		Queens (NC)	L 73–75		24 – Lewis	9 – Tied	3 – Williams	Siegel Center (7,637); Richmond, VA
Non-conference regular season
Nov 11, 2016*; 7:00 pm, WTVR 6.3		UNC Asheville	W 80–65	1–0	15 – Alie-Cox	6 – Tied (3)	4 – Brooks	Siegel Center (7,637); Richmond, VA
Nov 15, 2016*; 8:00 pm		at Liberty	W 64–59	2–0	13 – Lewis	8 – Alie-Cox	3 – Williams	Vines Center (3,289); Lynchburg, VA
Nov 18, 2016*; 7:00 pm, WTVR 6.3		Binghamton; Battle 4 Atlantis Opening Round	W 81–42	3–0	14 – Jenkins	10 – Jenkins	5 – Williams	Siegel Center (7,637); Richmond, VA
Nov 23, 2016*; 2:00 pm, ESPN2		vs. No. 20 Baylor; Battle 4 Atlantis quarterfinals	L 63–71	3–1	21 – Lewis	7 – Doughty	5 – Lewis	Imperial Arena (1,215); Nassau, BAH
Nov 24, 2016*; 7:00 pm, AXS TV		vs. St. John's; Battle 4 Atlantis 2nd round consolation	W 75–69	4–1	22 – Williams	13 – Tillman	6 – Williams	Imperial Arena (1,597); Nassau, BAH
Nov 25, 2016*; 7:00 pm, AXS TV		vs. LSU; Battle 4 Atlantis 5th place game	W 85–74	5–1	19 – Lewis	8 – Tillman	9 – Lewis	Imperial Arena (1,201); Nassau, BAH
Nov 29, 2016*; 7:00 pm, MASN		Princeton	W 81–70	6–1	23 – Lewis	7 – Burgess	12 – Lewis	Siegel Center (7,637); Richmond, VA
Dec 3, 2016*; 3:00 pm, CBSSN		vs. Illinois; Hoophall Miami Invitational	L 46–64	6–2	10 – Alie-Cox	7 – Burgess	3 – Williams	American Airlines Arena; Miami, FL
Dec 7, 2016*; 7:00 pm, ESPNU		Georgia Tech	L 73–76 ^{OT}	6–3	26 – Tillman	9 – Tillman	7 – Lewis	Siegel Center (7,637); Richmond, VA
Dec 10, 2016*; 8:00 pm, ASN		at Old Dominion; Rivalry	W 67–64	7–3	20 – Lewis	8 – Alie-Cox	4 – Brooks	Ted Constant Convocation Center (8,472); Norfolk, VA
Dec 17, 2016*; 7:00 pm, ASN		Middle Tennessee	W 80–77	8–3	20 – Lewis	11 – Burgess	4 – Doughty	Siegel Center (7,637); Richmond, VA
Dec 22, 2016*; 7:00 pm, WTVR-TV		Louisiana–Monroe	W 78–65	9–3	16 – Alie-Cox	8 – Doughty	6 – Brooks	Siegel Center (7,637); Richmond, VA
Dec 27, 2016*; 7:00 pm, MASN		Howard	W 85–51	10–3	17 – Lewis	9 – Tillman	6 – Williams	Siegel Center (7,637); Richmond, VA
Atlantic 10 regular season
Dec 30, 2016; 8:00 pm, CBSSN		at George Mason; Rivalry	W 73–64	11–3 (1–0)	26 – Lewis	11 – Tillman	5 – Williams	EagleBank Arena (7,780); Fairfax, VA
Jan 4, 2017; 7:00 pm, ASN		at Duquesne	W 94–87	12–3 (2–0)	23 – Doughty	7 – Doughty	9 – Doughty	Palumbo Center (1,038); Pittsburgh, PA
Jan 7, 2017; 1:00 pm, NBCSN		Massachusetts	W 81–64	13–3 (3–0)	17 – Lewis	10 – Tillman	6 – Lewis	Siegel Center (7,637); Richmond, VA
Jan 11, 2017; 6:30 pm, ESPN2		George Washington	W 85–55	14–3 (4–0)	20 – Tillman	13 – Tillman	7 – Lewis	Siegel Center (7,637); Richmond, VA
Jan 14, 2016; 2:00 pm, CBSSN		at Davidson	L 63–69	14–4 (4–1)	17 – Lewis	10 – Hamdy-Mohamed	4 – Lewis	John M. Belk Arena (4,636); Davidson, NC
Jan 18, 2017; 7:00 pm, MASN		at Fordham	L 67–69 ^{OT}	14–5 (4–2)	20 – Tillman	5 – Tillman	10 – Lewis	Rose Hill Gymnasium (2,186); Bronx, NY
Jan 22, 2017; 2:00 pm, NBCSN		La Salle	W 90–52	15–5 (5–2)	16 – Tillman	11 – Hamdy-Mohamed	5 – Lewis	Siegel Center (7,637); Richmond, VA
Jan 27, 2017; 9:00 pm, ESPN2		Dayton	W 73–68	16–5 (6–2)	18 – Tillman	9 – Tillman	5 – Doughty	Siegel Center (7,637); Richmond, VA
Feb 1, 2017; 7:00 pm, CBSSN		Richmond; Capital City Classic	W 81–74	17–5 (7–2)	18 – Tillman	9 – Tillman	6 – Doughty	Siegel Center (7,637); Richmond, VA
Feb 4, 2017; 4:00 pm, CBSSN		at St. Bonaventure	W 83–77 ^{OT}	18–5 (8–2)	20 – Alie-Cox	12 – Tillman	7 – Lewis	Reilly Center (5,480); Olean, NY
Feb 8, 2017; 9:00 pm, CBSSN		at George Washington	W 54–53	19–5 (9–2)	11 – Tillman	11 – Tillman	2 – Tied	Charles E. Smith Center (4,012); Washington, D.C.
Feb 11, 2017; 8:00 pm, CBSSN		Davidson	W 74–60	20–5 (10–2)	27 – Lewis	16 – Tillman	3 – Lewis	Siegel Center (7,637); Richmond, VA
Feb 14, 2017; 6:00 pm, CBSSN		Saint Joseph's	W 91–81	21–5 (11–2)	34 – Lewis	13 – Tillman	10 – Doughty	Siegel Center (7,637); Richmond, VA
Feb 17, 2017; 9:00 pm, ESPN2		at Richmond; Capital City Classic	W 84–73	22–5 (12–2)	16 – Lewis	7 – Lewis	5 – Lewis	Robins Center (7,201); Richmond, VA
Feb 22, 2017; 7:00 pm, ASN		Saint Louis	W 64–50	23–5 (13–2)	17 – Williams	10 – Tillman	4 – Lewis	Siegel Center (7,637); Richmond, VA
Feb 25, 2017; 1:00 pm, ESPN2		at Rhode Island	L 59–69	23–6 (13–3)	14 – Williams	7 – Brooks	2 – Brooks	Ryan Center (6,845); Kingston, RI
Mar 1, 2017; 8:00 pm, CBSSN		at Dayton	L 72–79	23–7 (13–4)	23 – Allie-Cox	10 – Tillman	5 – Tied	UD Arena (13,455); Dayton, OH
Mar 4, 2017; 2:00 pm, MASN		George Mason; Rivalry	W 72–60	24–7 (14–4)	24 – Tillman	11 – Tillman	9 – Lewis	Siegel Center (7,637); Richmond, VA
Atlantic 10 tournament
Mar 10, 2017; 6:00 pm, NBCSN	(2)	vs. (7) George Mason; Quarterfinals	W 71–60	25–7	15 – Jenkins	7 – Burgess	6 – Lewis	PPG Paints Arena (6,647); Pittsburgh, PA
Mar 11, 2017; 6:00 pm, CBSSN	(2)	vs. (3) Richmond; Semifinals	W 87–77 ^{OT}	26–7	18 – Lewis	14 – Tillman	7 – Williams	PPG Paints Arena (6,886); Pittsburgh, PA
Mar 12, 2017; 12:30 pm, CBS	(2)	vs. (4) Rhode Island; Championship	L 63–70	26–8	15 – Lewis	17 – Tillman	3 – Lewis	PPG Paints Arena (7,025); Pittsburgh, PA
NCAA tournament
March 16, 2017*; 7:20 pm, TBS	(10 W)	vs. (7 W) No. 22 Saint Mary's; First Round	L 77–85	26–9	30 – Lewis	7 – Tillman	2 – Tied	Vivint Smart Home Arena (16,341); Salt Lake City, UT
*Non-conference game. ^{#}Rankings from AP Poll. (#) Tournament seedings in parentheses. W=West Region. All times are in Eastern Time.
