= Hassan Martin =

American basketball player

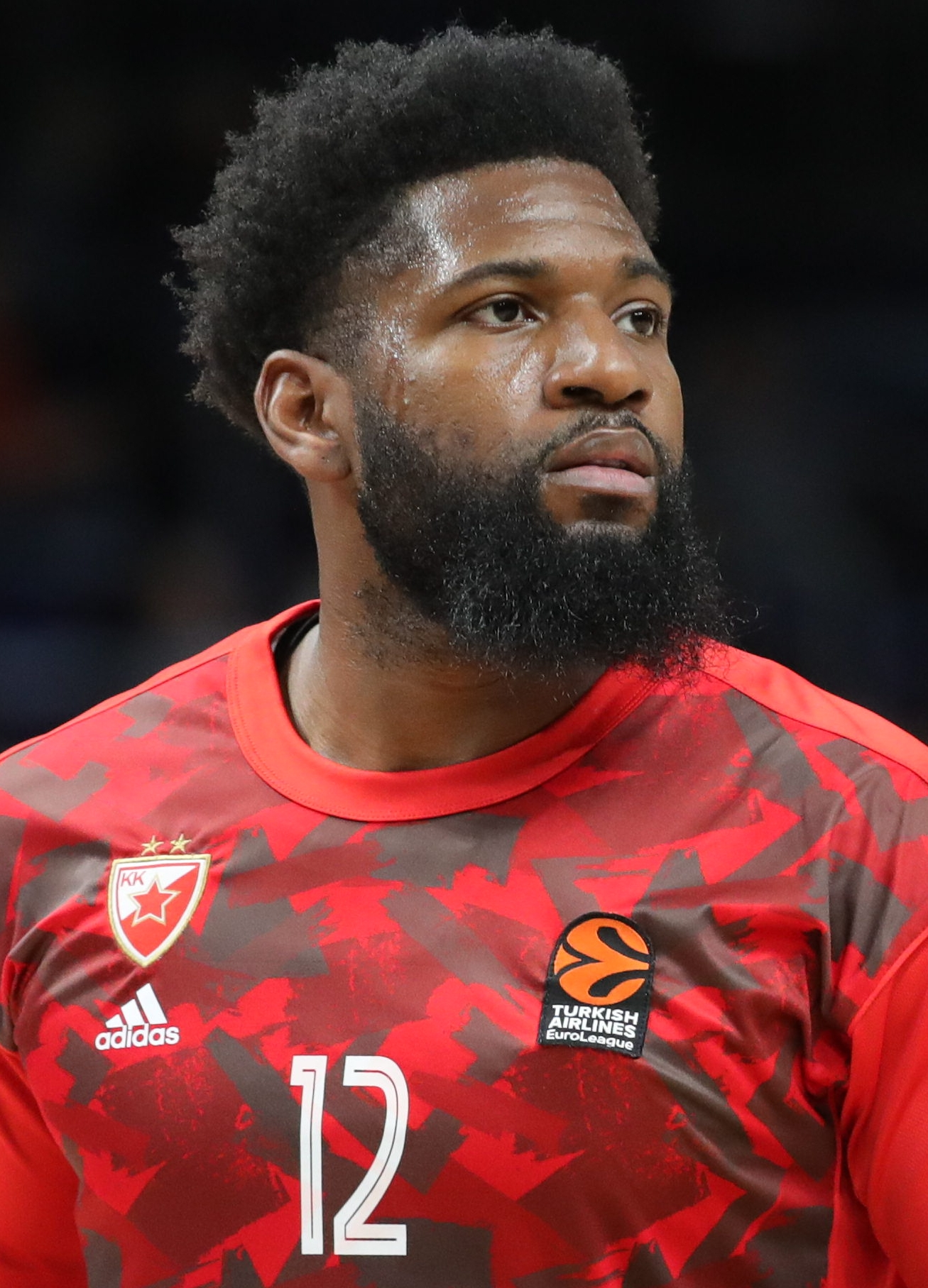
- Martin with Crvena zvezda in 2022

No. 12 – BCM Gravelines-Dunkerque
- Position: Center / power forward
- League: LNB Élite

Personal information
- Born: November 22, 1995 (age 30) Staten Island, New York, U.S.
- Listed height: 6 ft 7 in (2.01 m)
- Listed weight: 240 lb (109 kg)

Career information
- High school: Curtis (Staten Island, New York)
- College: Rhode Island (2013–2017)
- NBA draft: 2017: undrafted
- Playing career: 2017–present

Career history
- 2017–2018: Ryukyu Golden Kings
- 2018: Medi Bayreuth
- 2019–2020: Budućnost
- 2020–2022: Olympiacos
- 2022–2023: Crvena zvezda
- 2023–2024: Shimane Susanoo Magic
- 2025: Hapoel Holon
- 2025–2026: Manisa Basket
- 2026–present: BCM Gravelines-Dunkerque

Career highlights
- Greek League champion (2022); Greek Cup winner (2022); Serbian League champion (2023); Serbian Cup winner (2023); Montenegrin Cup winner (2020); EuroCup blocks leader (2020); 2× Atlantic 10 Defensive Player of the Year (2016, 2017); 2× Second-team All-Atlantic 10 (2015, 2017); 3× Atlantic 10 All-Defensive Team (2015–2017)

Hassan Martin (born November 12, 1995) is an American professional basketball player for BCM Gravelines-Dunkerque of the LNB Élite. He played college basketball for the Rhode Island Rams.

== College career ==
Martin averaged 6.3 points per game as a freshman at Rhode Island and increased his scoring rate to 11.4 points per game as a sophomore. As a junior, Martin posted 12.0 points per game. As a senior, Martin averaged 13.6 points, 6.8 rebounds and 2.4 blocks per game. He was a big part of the first Rams team to reach the NCAA Tournament since 1999. He was twice named Atlantic 10 Defensive Player of the Year. He was named to the All-Atlantic 10 Second Team as a senior despite missing five games with an injury and being limited for several more.

== Professional career ==
=== Ryukyu Golden Kings (2017–2018) ===
After going undrafted in 2017, he played for the Orlando Magic in the Summer League. He signed with the Ryukyu Golden Kings of the Japanese league, where he became one of the leading scorers and drew praise for his athleticism.

=== Medi Bayreuth (2018) ===
In 2018, Martin signed a deal with Medi Bayreuth of the German Basketball Bundesliga (BBL).

=== Budućnost (2019–2020) ===
On June 27, 2019, Martin signed a contract with Budućnost VOLI of the ABA League.

=== Olympiacos (2020–2022) ===
On June 30, 2020, Martin signed a two-year deal with Greek powerhouse Olympiacos of the Greek Basket League (GBL) and the EuroLeague.

=== Crvena zvezda (2022–2023) ===
On July 9, 2022, Martin signed a two-year contract with Serbian club Crvena zvezda of the Basketball League of Serbia (KLS), the ABA League, and the EuroLeague.

=== Shimane Susanoo Magic (2023–2024) ===
On June 29, 2023, Martin signed with Japanese club Shimane Susanoo Magic of the B.League.

=== Hapoel Holon (2025) ===
On August 27, 2025, Martin signed with Hapoel Holon of the Ligat HaAl.

=== Manisa Basket (2025–2026) ===
On December 17, 2025, he signed with Manisa Basket of the Basketbol Süper Ligi (BSL).

=== BCM Gravelines-Dunkerque (2026–present) ===
On September 17, 2026, Martin signed with BCM Gravelines-Dunkerque of the French LNB Élite.

== Career achievements and awards ==
- Greek League champion: 1 (with Olympiacos: 2021–22)
- Greek Cup winner: 1 (with Olympiacos: 2021–22)
- Montenegrin Cup winner: 1 (with Budućnost VOLI: 2019–20)

Individual

- Atlantic 10 Defensive Player of the Year – 2016, 2017
- All-Atlantic 10 Second Team – 2015, 2017
- Atlantic 10 All-Defensive Team – 2015, 2016, 2017
