= De'Riante Jenkins =

American basketball player (born 1996)

Free agent
- Position: Shooting guard

Personal information
- Born: November 12, 1996 (age 30)
- Listed height: 6 ft 5 in (1.96 m)
- Listed weight: 190 lb (86 kg)

Career information
- High school: Lake Marion (Santee, South Carolina); West Oaks Academy (Orlando, Florida); Hargrave Military Academy (Chatham, Virginia)
- College: VCU (2016–2020)
- NBA draft: 2020: undrafted
- Playing career: 2021–present

Career history
- 2021–2022: BC Luleå
- 2022: Trapani
- 2023: Basketball Nymburk

Career highlights
- Third-team All-Atlantic 10 (2019)

De'Riante Jenkins (born November 12, 1996) is an American professional basketball player. He played college basketball for the VCU Rams.

== Early life ==
Jenkins grew up in Eutawville, South Carolina and played basketball and football. He attended Lake Marion High School in Santee, South Carolina, and led the team to a 2013 state title. On the gridiron, Jenkins played quarterback and threw for 3,500 yards and 26 touchdowns as a sophomore, before deciding to focus completely on basketball. For his senior season, he originally opted to transfer to Oldsmar Christian School in Oklahoma, but was expelled shortly after the beginning of the school year. Jenkins was accepted to West Oaks Academy in Florida several days later. He completed a postgraduate year at Hargrave Military Academy and averaged 22 points per game. Jenkins was a highly-rated recruit, considered a four-star prospect ranked No. 43 in his class.

== College career ==
In September 2015, Jenkins committed to playing college basketball for VCU, choosing the Rams over offers from Clemson, South Carolina and Tennessee.

Jenkins averaged 4.3 points and 1.7 rebounds per game as a freshman. He sat out 15 games due to breaking his right foot. On November 21, 2017, Jenkins scored a career-high 27 points and had 11 rebounds in an 83–69 win over California. As a sophomore, Jenkins averaged 12.9 points and 3.7 rebounds per game. Jenkins averaged 11.3 points and 3.9 rebounds per game as a junior, emerging as a leader on the team and helping VCU reach the NCAA Tournament. He was named third-team All-Atlantic 10. On February 29, 2020, Jenkins stepped away from basketball due to an undisclosed health issue. As a senior, he averaged 10.7 points, 4.2 rebounds, 2 assists, and 1.9 steals per game, shooting 40 percent from the floor.

== Professional career ==
On August 5, 2021, Jenkins signed his first professional contract with BC Luleå of the Swedish Basketligan. In 40 games in the 2021–22 season, he averaged 17.1 points, 4.2 rebounds, 2.9 assists and 1.7 steals per game.

In October 2022, Jenkins had a four-game stint with Trapani of the Italian Serie A2. In January 2023, he had a two-game stint with Basketball Nymburk of the Czech NBL.

== Career statistics ==
Legend
GP	Games played	GS	Games started	MPG	Minutes per game
FG%	Field goal percentage	3P%	3-point field goal percentage	FT%	Free throw percentage
RPG	Rebounds per game	APG	Assists per game	SPG	Steals per game
BPG	Blocks per game	PPG	Points per game	**Bold**	Career high

=== College ===
Year	Team	GP	GS	MPG	FG%	3P%	FT%	RPG	APG	SPG	BPG	PPG
2016–17	VCU	21	0	12.3	**.500**	**.455**	.625	1.7	.5	.3	.1	4.3
2017–18	VCU	**33**	**33**	**29.5**	.433	.418	.750	3.7	**2.5**	1.3	.2	**12.9**
2018–19	VCU	32	32	28.0	.405	.341	.750	3.9	2.0	.8	**.5**	11.3
2019–20	VCU	28	28	26.8	.396	.333	**.875**	**4.2**	2.0	**1.9**	.3	10.7
Career		114	93	25.3	.419	.374	.785	3.5	1.9	1.1	.3	10.3

== Personal life ==
His father, Ty Jenkins, was shot and killed outside his home on September 30, 2014. Jenkins has a son.
