= Mo Alie-Cox =

American football player (born 1993)

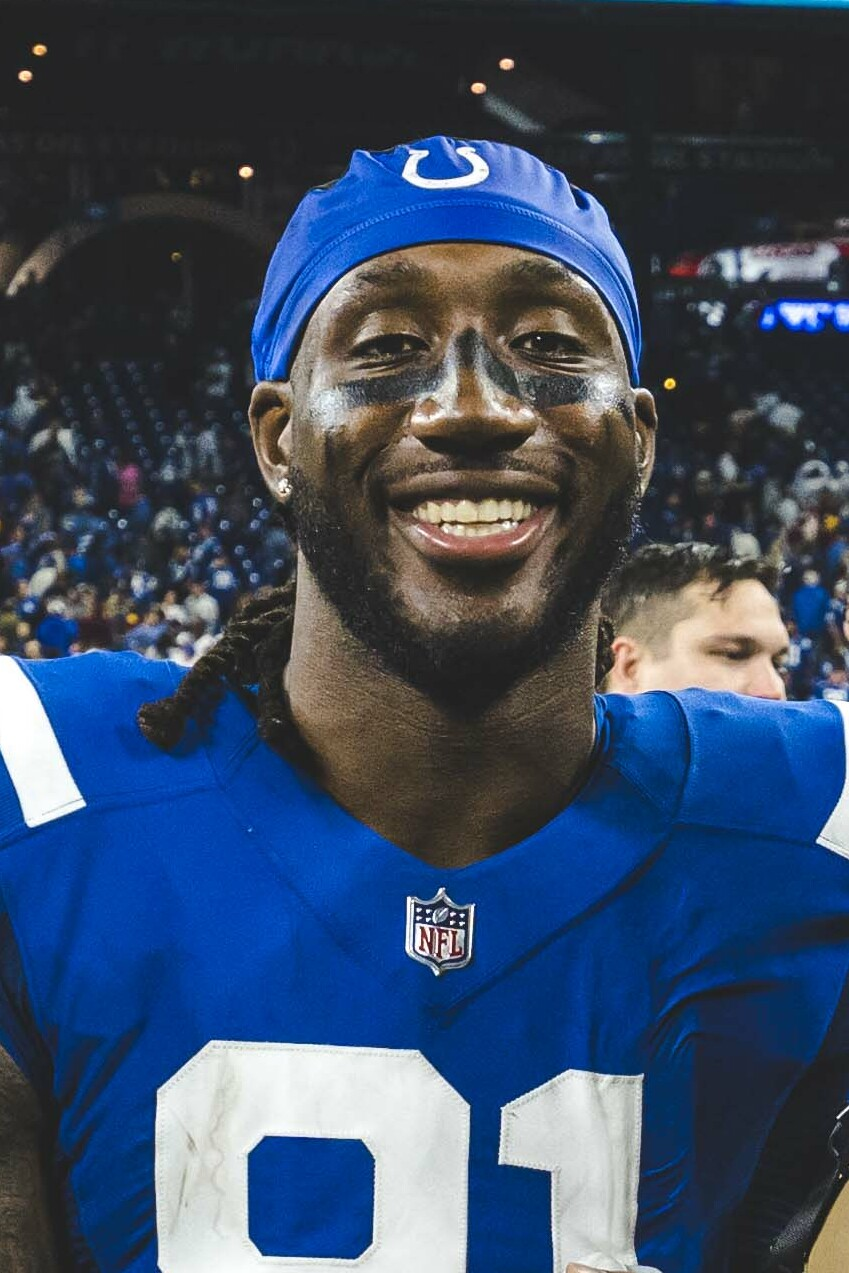
- Alie-Cox with Indianapolis Colts in 2022

No. 81 – Indianapolis Colts
- Position: Tight end
- Roster status: Injured reserve

Personal information
- Born: September 19, 1993 (age 33); Alexandria, Virginia, U.S.
- Listed height: 6 ft 5 in (1.96 m)
- Listed weight: 267 lb (121 kg)

Career information
- High school: Middleburg Academy (Middleburg, Virginia)
- College: VCU (basketball)
- NFL draft: 2017: undrafted

Career history
- Indianapolis Colts (2017–present)

Awards and highlights
- 3× Atlantic 10 All-Defensive Team (2015–2017); Third-team All-Atlantic 10 (2016)

Career NFL statistics as of Week 9, 2026
- Receptions: 131
- Receiving yards: 1,581
- Receiving touchdowns: 17
- Stats at Pro Football Reference

Mohamed Alie-Cox (born September 19, 1993) is an American professional football tight end for the Indianapolis Colts of the National Football League (NFL). He played college basketball at VCU. Despite not having played organized football since he was a freshman in high school, Alie-Cox signed as an undrafted free agent with the Colts in 2017, and played for the team for nine seasons.

== College basketball career ==
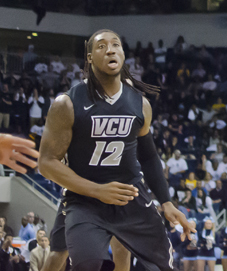
Alie-Cox with the VCU Rams men's basketball team in 2014

Alie-Cox was a four-year standout playing power forward for the VCU Rams. He quickly became a fan favorite for his defensive presence and shot blocking ability fans dubbed him the “Mo Says No” chant. He started 103 games and totaled 1,092 points, 663 rebounds, 87 steals, 112 assists and 255 blocks in 3,322 minutes. He averaged over 25 minutes a game in his final three years. He also led VCU to its first ever Atlantic 10 Conference championship, earning all tournament team honors. He is the school's all-time leader in field goal percentage.

== Professional football career ==
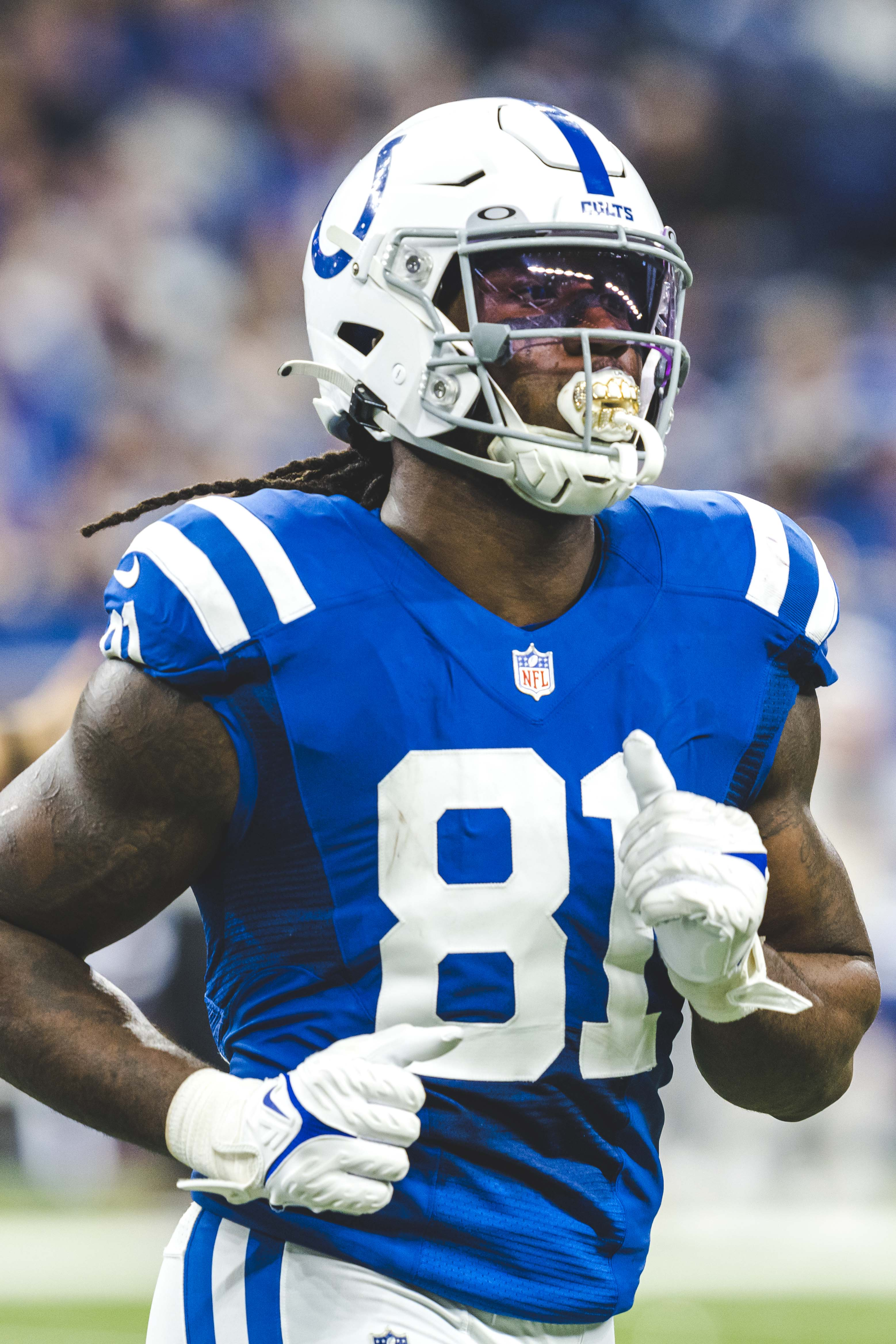
Alie-Cox in 2022

Pre-draft measurables
Height	Weight	Hand span	40-yard dash	Three-cone drill	Vertical jump	Broad jump
6 ft 5 1/2 in (1.97 m)	262 lb (119 kg)	11 3/4 in (0.30 m)	4.75 s	7.25 s	35 1/2 in (0.90 m)	10 ft 2 in (3.10 m)
All values from Pro Day

On April 21, 2017, Alie-Cox signed with the Indianapolis Colts, having not played organized football since his freshman year of high school. He was waived/injured by the Colts on August 5, 2017, after suffering a lower leg injury and was placed on injured reserve. He was released with an injury settlement on August 11, 2017. He was re-signed to the Colts' practice squad on October 7, 2017. He signed a reserve/future contract with the Colts on January 1, 2018.

On September 1, 2018, Alie-Cox was waived by the Colts and was signed to the practice squad the next day. He was promoted to the active roster on September 28, 2018. In Week 4, against the Houston Texans, he made his NFL debut and recorded a 17-yard reception. He was waived again on October 3, 2018, and re-signed back to the practice squad. He was promoted back to the active roster on October 12, 2018. He recorded his first career touchdown catch, a highlight reel one-handed grab, on a 26-yard reception from Andrew Luck in a 42–28 victory over the Oakland Raiders on October 28, 2018. On December 30, 2019, Alie-Cox was signed to a one-year extension through 2020. In the 2019 season, he finished with eight receptions for 93 yards in 16 games and two starts.

Alie-Cox was placed on the active/physically unable to perform list at the start of training camp on July 28, 2020. He was activated on August 21, 2020. On September 20, 2020, Alie-Cox had five receptions for 111 receiving yards helping the Colts win 28–11 over the Minnesota Vikings. In the 2020 season, he had 31 receptions for 394 yards and two touchdowns in 15 games and six starts.

The Colts placed a second-round restricted free agent tender on March 17, 2021. He signed the one-year contract on May 3. In the 2021 season, he had 24 receptions for 316 yards and four touchdowns in 17 games and seven starts.

On March 15, 2022, Alie-Cox signed a three-year, $18 million contract extension with the Colts. In the 2022 season, he had 19 receptions for 189 yards and three touchdowns in 17 games and 11 starts.

In the 2023 season, Alie-Cox had 13 receptions for 161 yards and three touchdowns in 17 games and seven starts. In the 2024 season, he had 12 receptions for 147 yards and one touchdown.

On April 11, 2025, Alie-Cox re-signed with the Colts on a one-year contract. He finished the 2025 season with 13 receptions for 117 yards and one touchdown.

On March 16, 2026, Alie-Cox re-signed with the Colts on a one-year, $2.59 million contract.

== Career statistics ==
Legend
**Bold**	Career high

=== NFL ===
==== Regular season ====
Year	Team	Games		Receiving					Fumbles	
Year	Team	GP	GS	Rec	Yds	Avg	Lng	TD	Fum	Lost
2018	IND	9	1	7	133	**19.0**	34	2	0	0
2019	IND	16	2	8	93	11.6	21	0	0	0
2020	IND	15	6	**31**	**394**	12.7	**45**	2	**1**	**1**
2021	IND	**17**	7	24	316	13.2	37	**4**	**1**	0
2022	IND	**17**	11	19	189	9.9	34	3	**1**	**1**
2023	IND	**17**	7	13	161	12.4	35	3	0	0
2024	IND	**17**	**13**	12	147	12.3	22	1	0	0
2025	IND	**17**	6	13	117	9.0	20	1	0	0
2026	IND	9	4	4	31	7.8	16	1	0	0
Career		134	57	131	1,581	12.1	45	17	3	2

==== Postseason ====
Year	Team	Games		Receiving					Fumbles	
Year	Team	GP	GS	Rec	Yds	Avg	Lng	TD	Fum	Lost
2018	IND	**2**	**1**	0	0	0.0	0	0	0	0
2020	IND	1	**1**	**4**	**32**	**8.0**	**16**	0	0	0
Career		3	2	4	32	8.0	16	0	0	0

=== College ===
Legend
GP	Games played	GS	Games started	MPG	Minutes per game
FG%	Field goal percentage	3P%	3-point field goal percentage	FT%	Free throw percentage
RPG	Rebounds per game	APG	Assists per game	SPG	Steals per game
BPG	Blocks per game	PPG	Points per game	**Bold**	Career high

Year	Team	GP	GS	MPG	FG%	3P%	FT%	RPG	APG	SPG	BPG	PPG
2013–14	VCU	35	4	14.4	.519	–	.596	3.6	.3	.3	1.4	3.3
2014–15	VCU	**36**	**36**	26.0	.594	–	.604	**5.7**	.8	.6	1.9	7.4
2015–16	VCU	**36**	**36**	**26.7**	**.612**	–	**.745**	5.1	**1.0**	.7	1.9	**10.4**
2016–17	VCU	35	27	26.3	.543	–	.743	4.2	**1.0**	**.8**	**2.0**	9.5
Career		142	103	23.4	.574	–	.687	4.7	.8	.6	1.8	7.7

== Personal life ==
Alie-Cox's parents are originally from Sierra Leone.
