= Maurice Joseph =

Canadian basketball player and coach

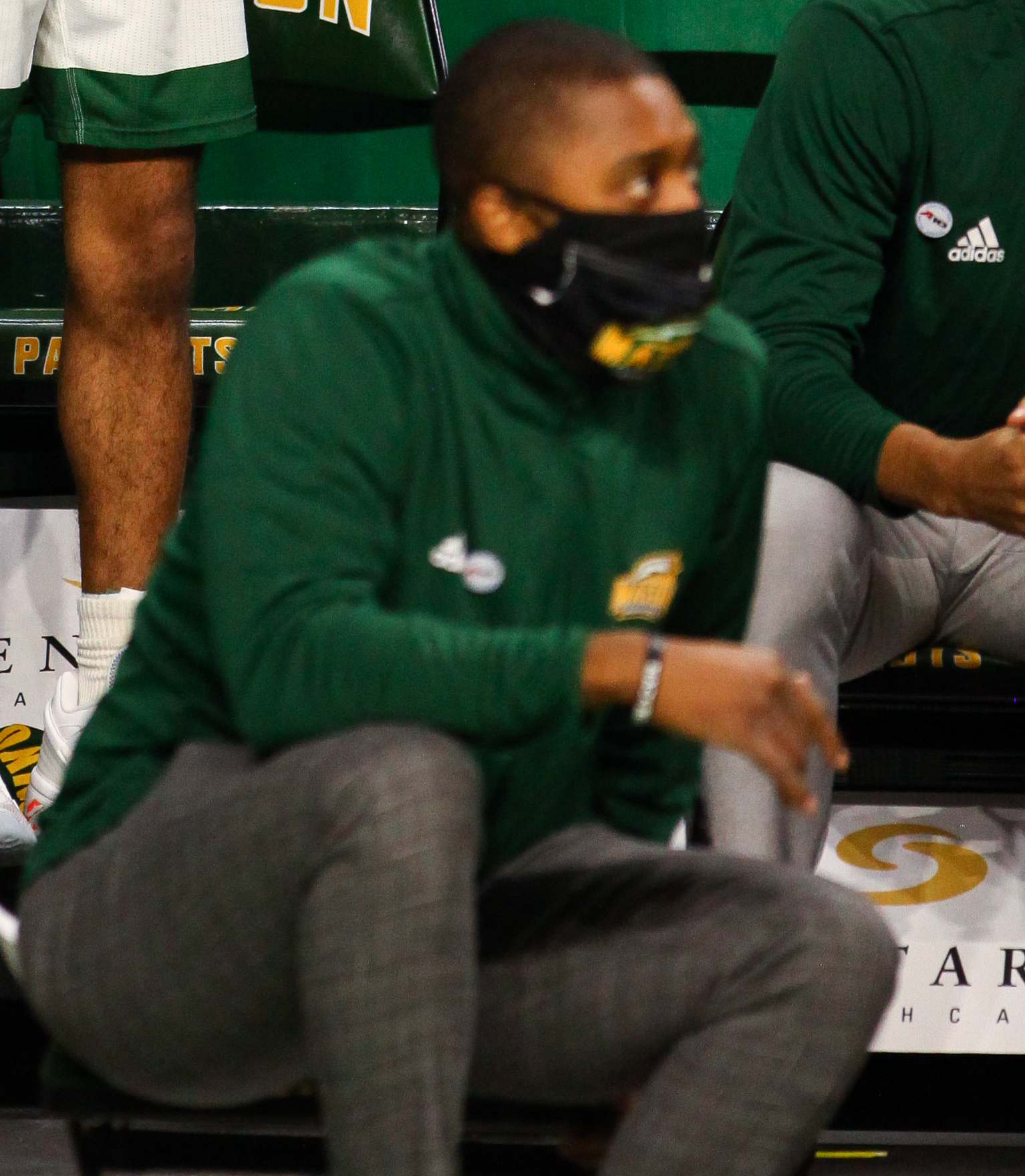
- Joseph in 2021

Current position
- Title: Assistant coach
- Team: Richmond
- Conference: Atlantic 10

Biographical details
- Born: August 26, 1985 (age 41); Montreal, Quebec, Canada

Playing career
- 2005–2007: Michigan State
- 2008–2010: Vermont
- 2010–2011: Hapoel Afula
- Position: Guard

Coaching career (HC unless noted)
- 2011–2016: George Washington (assistant)
- 2016–2019: George Washington
- 2019–2020: Fairleigh Dickinson (assistant)
- 2020–2021: George Mason (assistant)
- 2021–2022: Richmond (assistant)
- 2022–2026: Butler (assistant)
- 2026–present: Richmond (assistant)

Head coaching record
- Overall: 44–57
- Tournaments: 1–1 (CBI)

Maurice Joseph (born August 26, 1985) is a Canadian former basketball player and coach, currently an assistant coach at Richmond. He is the former head coach of the George Washington University Colonials men's basketball team.

== Playing career ==
After a standout prep career at Champlain-St. Lambert in his native Montreal, Joseph committed to play basketball at Michigan State under Tom Izzo. Joseph appeared in 52 games and was a part of two NCAA Tournament squads for the Spartans over a two-year period, averaging 3.8 points per game before transferring to Vermont, closer to his Montreal home. In two seasons with the Catamounts, Joseph was the team's second-leading scorer with 13.9 points per game, helping Vermont to its fourth NCAA Tournament appearance in 2010.

Upon graduation, Joseph played professional basketball in Israel with Hapoel Afula B.C., while also representing the home nation of his parents, Trinidad and Tobago, playing on its national basketball team in 2010.

== Coaching career ==
=== George Washington ===
In 2011, Joseph joined his former coach at Vermont, Mike Lonergan, on his staff at George Washington, rising from director of basketball operations to assistant coach.

In 2017, Joseph was elevated to the interim head coaching position after Lonergan was fired by the school amid reports of verbal player abuse and misconduct. Joseph was confirmed to the head coach position on March 27, 2017, with a 5-year deal with the university. Joseph was one of four Canadian-born NCAA Division I men's basketball head coaches all-time, joining James Naismith, Pete Newell, and Paul Weir. On March 15, 2019 Joseph was fired from George Washington, amassing a 44–57 overall record.

During Joseph's time he coached future NBA players Patricio Garino, Tyler Cavanaugh and Yuta Watanabe.

=== Fairleigh Dickinson ===
On August 7, 2019 Joseph was named an assistant coach at Fairleigh Dickinson under Greg Herenda.

=== George Mason ===
Joseph was hired to be on Dave Paulsen's staff at George Mason in June, 2020.

=== Richmond ===
In May 2021, Chris Mooney added Joseph to his coaching staff at Richmond.

=== Butler ===
In May 2022, Thad Matta added Joseph to his coaching staff at Butler.

=== Richmond ===
Upon Matta's retirement as Butler head coach at the conclusion of the 2025–26 season, Joseph rejoined the Richmond coaching staff as an assistant.

== Personal ==
Joseph's brother is former NBA player Kris Joseph, a second round selection by the Boston Celtics in the 2012 NBA draft. He is also the second cousin of Cory Joseph, currently of the Detroit Pistons, as well as Devoe Joseph, a former first-team All-Pac-12 selection at Oregon.

== Head coaching record ==
Record table
Season	Team	Overall	Conference	Standing	Postseason
George Washington Colonials (Atlantic 10 Conference) (2016–2019)
2016–17	George Washington	20–15	10–8	6th	CBI Quarterfinal
2017–18	George Washington	15–18	7–11	11th	
2018–19	George Washington	9–24	4–14	T–12th	
George Washington:		44–57 (.436)	21–33 (.389)		
Total:		44–57 (.436)			
