= Will Wade =

American basketball coach (born 1982)

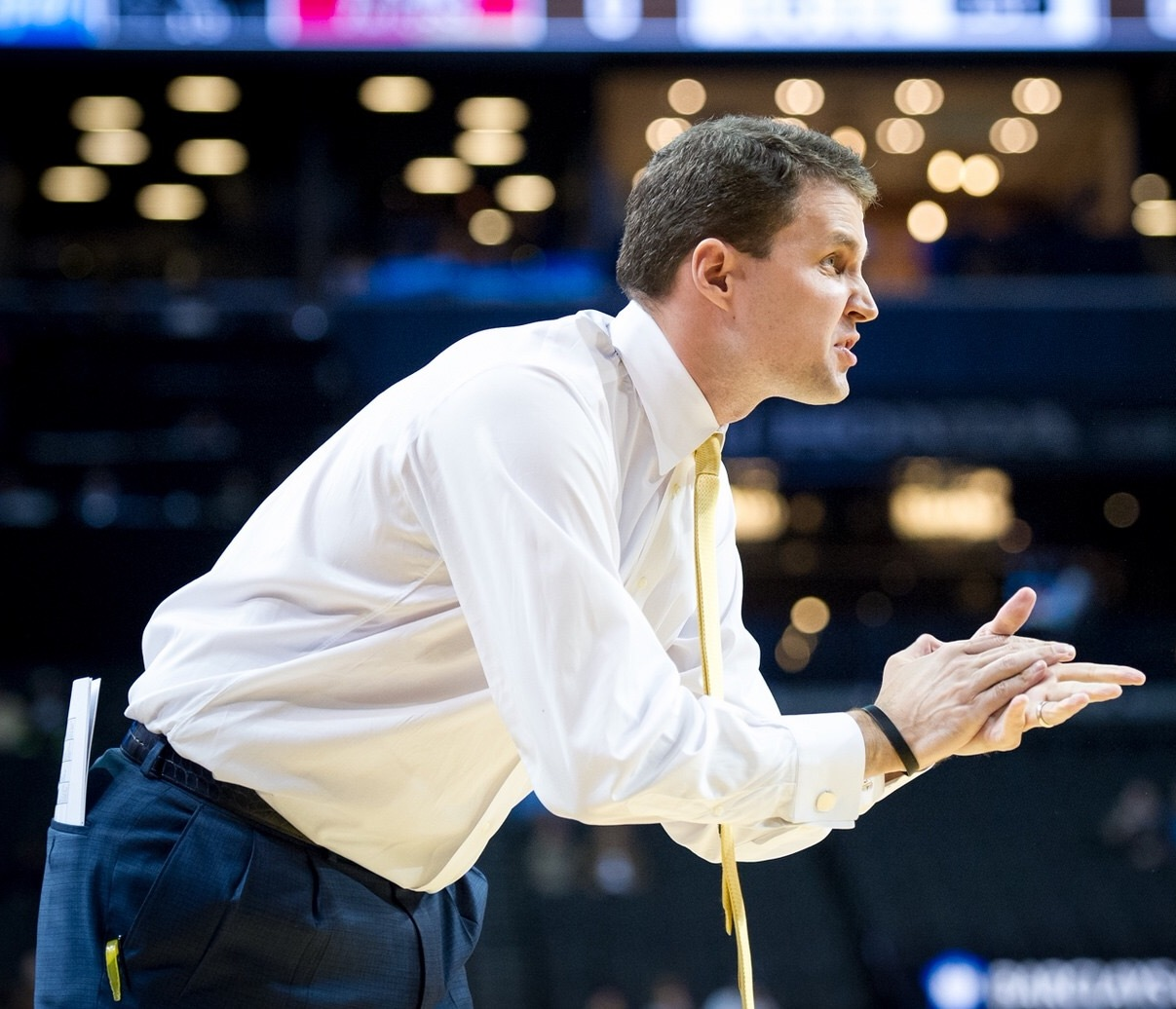
- Wade coaching VCU in 2016

Current position
- Title: Head coach
- Team: LSU
- Conference: SEC
- Record: 111–51 (.685)

Biographical details
- Born: November 26, 1982 (age 43); Memphis, Tennessee, U.S.
- Education: Clemson ('05)

Coaching career (HC unless noted)
- 2005–2007: Clemson (GA)
- 2007–2009: Harvard (assistant)
- 2009–2013: VCU (assistant)
- 2013–2015: Chattanooga
- 2015–2017: VCU
- 2017–2022: LSU
- 2023–2025: McNeese
- 2025–2026: NC State
- 2026–present: LSU

Head coaching record
- Overall: 272–119 (.696)
- Tournaments: 5–8 (NCAA Division I); 1–1 (NIT); 0–1 (CIT)

Accomplishments and honors

Championships
- Atlantic 10 regular season (2016); SEC regular season (2019); 2 Southland tournament (2024, 2025); 2 Southland regular season (2024, 2025)

Awards
- SoCon Coach of the Year (2014); 2× Southland Coach of the Year (2024, 2025)

William Wade (born November 26, 1982) is an American college basketball coach who is currently in his second stint as the head men's basketball coach at LSU, a position he held from 2017 to 2022. He previously served as head coach at Chattanooga, VCU, McNeese, and NC State.

== Assistant coach (2007–2013) ==
Will Wade began his career as the student manager of the Clemson Tigers men's basketball team from 2002 to 2005. He worked under head coaches Larry Shyatt and Oliver Purnell, who gave him further opportunities as a graduate assistant (2005–06) and Director of Basketball Operations (2006–07).

Tommy Amaker then brought him in as his first hire as Harvard Crimson men's basketball coach where he was responsible for helping to recruit a top-25 class for the program. He stayed at Harvard for the 2007–08 and 2008–09 seasons.

He then left for Virginia Commonwealth University (VCU). Wade was brought in as an assistant to then-head coach Shaka Smart at VCU (Wade was Smart's first hire as he had been Amaker's). He helped VCU to four consecutive postseason appearances, including a trip to the 2011 Final Four. VCU finished the 2012–13 season with a 27–9 overall mark and a No. 23 final national ranking. The VCU Rams were one of only five teams nationally to win 27 or more games in each season from 2009 to 2013 (the others being Duke, Kansas, Syracuse, and Ohio State). In Wade's four years as an assistant coach, VCU was 111–37 (.750) with three straight trips to the NCAA Tournament.

== Head coaching career (2013–present) ==
=== Chattanooga 2013–2015 ===
In 2013, Wade left his assistant coaching position at VCU to lead the Chattanooga Mocs basketball program. In his two seasons as head coach, he posted both winning overall and conference records, and led the Mocs to their first 20+-win season in 10 years. He was named the Southern Conference's 2014 Coach of the Year.

=== VCU 2015–2017 ===
After two seasons at Chattanooga, Wade returned to VCU to take the head coaching position vacated by Shaka Smart. In his first season upon returning to VCU, Wade guided the team to its first Atlantic 10 Conference regular-season championship, and to a 25–11 overall record. VCU made the championship game of the A10 conference tournament for the fourth straight season, falling to St. Joseph's. The Rams also made their sixth straight NCAA tournament, one of only eight teams in the country to do so. VCU made it to the round of 32, where it fell to Oklahoma 85–81. Wade finished second in voting for A10 coach of the year.

=== LSU (first stint) 2017–2022 ===
On March 21, 2017, Wade accepted an offer to become the head coach at Louisiana State University. On December 28, 2017, Wade earned his 100th career victory with a win over Memphis.

During the 2018–19 season, Wade's Tigers won their first five SEC games in a row. It was the first LSU team to do this since the 2005–06 team. They also claimed two victories over top-5 opponents (Kentucky and Tennessee), the first LSU team to do so since 1980. Wade coached the 2018–19 team to the Southeastern Conference regular season championship.

On March 7, 2019, it was reported that Wade discussed an offer to a recruit, which was overheard on a Federal Bureau of Investigation wiretap. Wade described the payment as a "strong-ass offer", and in the transcripts he is quoted as saying that he was frustrated with the situation: “I’ll be honest with you, I’m fucking tired of dealing with the thing. Like I’m just fucking sick of dealing with the shit. Like, this should not be that fucking complicated.” The following day, LSU announced that he was indefinitely suspended amid the FBI's probe. Tony Benford was named interim head coach at LSU during Wade's suspension. On April 14, 2019, LSU lifted Wade's suspension.

It was also reported on April 24, 2019, that Wade agreed to modifications to his contract, in order to be reinstated. Some of the changes included: 1) to forfeit $250,000.00 in bonuses he would have otherwise earned during the time of his suspension, 2) the contract also allowed LSU to fire Wade for cause if he committed a Level I or Level II NCAA violation, and 3) he could also be terminated if the NCAA infractions committee issued a formal notice to LSU that Wade was involved in a Level I or Level II violation.

On August 25, 2020, reports surfaced that the investigation into the numerous alleged recruiting violations by Wade was ongoing and headed to an independent panel. Two separate NCAA committees referred LSU's case to the IARP (Independent Accountability Resolution Process, a system formed in response to a Condoleezza Rice-led commission on college basketball). Had this panel issued a formal notice of allegations, it would have ended the tenure of Wade based on the renegotiated contract of 2019. He was terminated as coach on March 12, 2022, after the NCAA formally served a notice of allegations based on the investigations into reports of recruiting violations.

=== McNeese 2023–2025 ===
Wade was hired to coach at McNeese State University on March 12, 2023, replacing John Aiken.

On June 22, Wade was suspended for the first 10 games of the 2023–24 season and was given a two-year show-cause penalty for his recruiting and bribery violations at LSU.

On March 20, 2025, Wade led McNeese to its first-ever NCAA tournament win, beating Clemson 69–67 in the Round of 64. The Cowboys went on to lose to 4-seed Purdue 62–76 in the Round of 32.

=== NC State 2025 ===
On March 22, 2025, Wade signed a six-year contract to be the next head coach at NC State, replacing Kevin Keatts.

NC State was eliminated in the First Four of the 2026 NCAA Division I men's basketball tournament. On March 26, 2026, Wade abruptly resigned to return to LSU less than 48 hours after meeting with NC State athletic director Boo Corrigan and other school officials to discuss the state of the Wolfpack program. According to Corrigan, Wade submitted his resignation through an email from his agent.

=== LSU (second stint) 2026–present ===
On March 26, 2026, Wade agreed to return to LSU as their head coach, replacing Matt McMahon. He signed a number of former professionals for the 2026 season, including RJ Luis Jr, part of the Boston Celtics during the preseason of the 2025-26 NBA season.

== Head coaching record ==
Record table
Season	Team	Overall	Conference	Standing	Postseason
Chattanooga Mocs (Southern Conference) (2013–2015)
2013–14	Chattanooga	18–15	12–4	2nd	CIT first round
2014–15	Chattanooga	22–10	15–3	2nd	
Chattanooga:		40–25 (.615)	27–7 (.794)		
VCU Rams (Atlantic 10 Conference) (2015–2017)
2015–16	VCU	25–11	14–4	T–1st	NCAA Division I Round of 32
2016–17	VCU	26–9	14–4	2nd	NCAA Division I Round of 64
VCU:		51–20 (.718)	28–8 (.778)		
LSU Tigers (Southeastern Conference) (2017–2022)
2017–18	LSU	18–15	8–10	T–9th	NIT second round
2018–19	LSU	25–5*	15–2*	1st	NCAA Division I Sweet 16*
2019–20	LSU	21–10	12–6	T–2nd	All postseason cancelled-COVID
2020–21	LSU	19–10	11–6	3rd	NCAA Division I Round of 32
2021–22	LSU	22–11**	9–9**	T–5th	NCAA Division I Round of 64**
McNeese Cowboys (Southland Conference) (2023–2025)
2023–24	McNeese	22–2	17–1	1st	NCAA Division I Round of 64
2024–25	McNeese	28–7	19–1	1st	NCAA Division I Round of 32
McNeese:		50–9 (.847)	36–2 (.947)		
NC State Wolfpack (Atlantic Coast Conference) (2025–2026)
2025–26	NC State	20–14	10–8	T–7th	NCAA Division I First Four
NC State:		20–14 (.588)	10–8 (.556)		
LSU Tigers (Southeastern Conference) (2026–present)
2026–27	LSU	5–0	0–0		
LSU:		110–51 (.683)	55–33 (.625)		
Total:		271–119 (.695)			
National champion Postseason invitational champion Conference regular season champion Conference regular season and conference tournament champion Division regular season champion Division regular season and conference tournament champion Conference tournament champion

*Wade was suspended the final five games of the 2018–19 season. Tony Benford coached the team and was credited with the wins and losses.
**LSU fired Wade on March 12, 2022. Kevin Nickelberry coached the team and was credited with the loss.
