= ShawnDre' Jones =

American basketball player (born 1994)

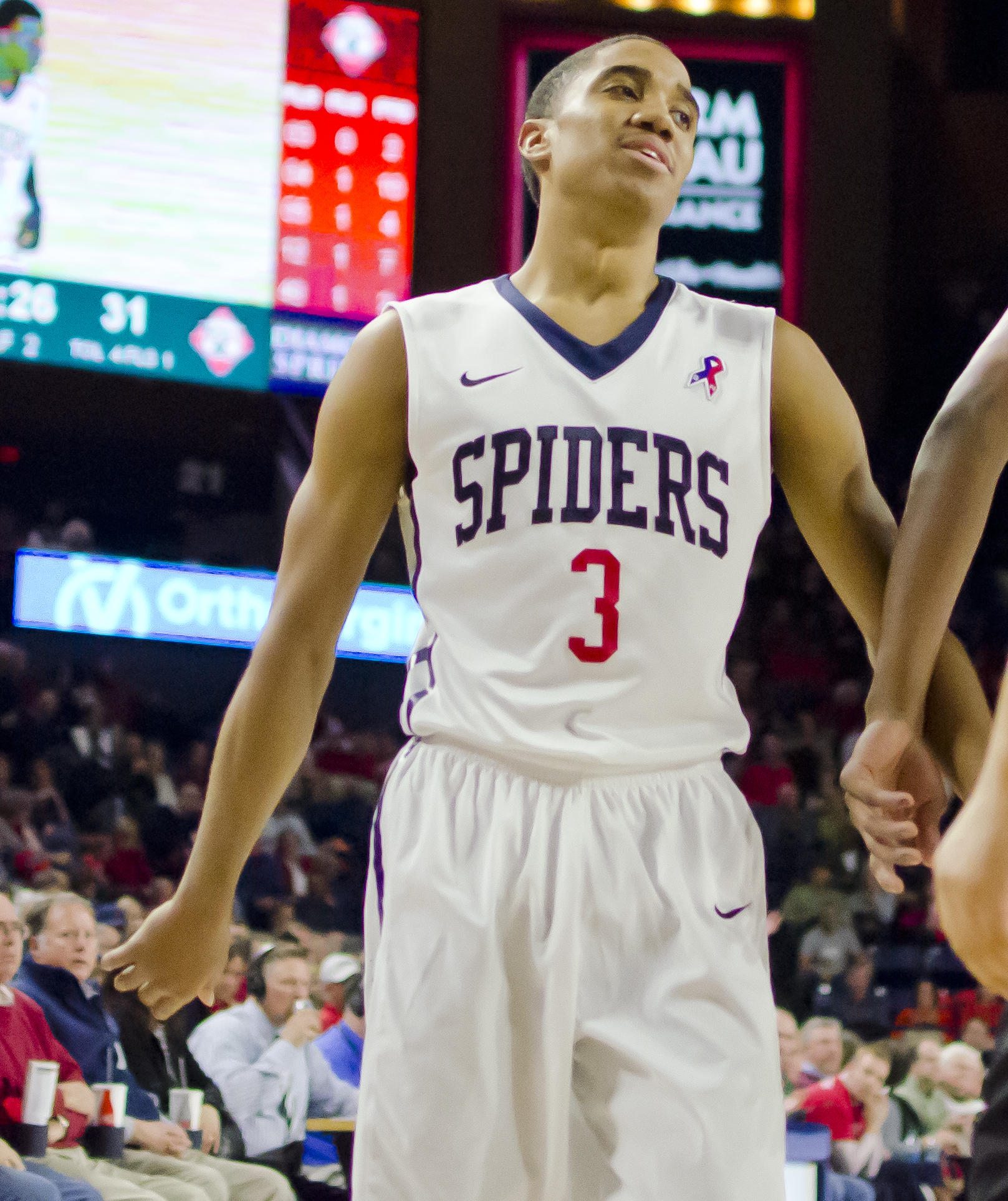
- Jones playing for Richmond in 2015

Personal information
- Born: November 18, 1994 (age 31) Richmond, Virginia
- Listed height: 6 ft 0 in (1.83 m)
- Listed weight: 170 lb (77 kg)

Career information
- High school: George Bush (Mission Bend, Texas)
- College: Richmond (2013–2017)
- NBA draft: 2017: undrafted
- Playing career: 2017–2025
- Position: Point guard

Career history
- 2017–2018: Aries Trikala
- 2018–2019: Canton Charge
- 2019–2020: Northern Arizona Suns
- 2021–2024: Motor City Cruise

Career highlights
- Atlantic 10 Sixth Man of the Year (2015)

ShawnDre' Jones (born November 18, 1994) is an American former professional basketball player He played college basketball for the Richmond Spiders.

== Early life and high school ==
Jones was born in Richmond, Virginia, and grew up in Highland Springs, Virginia, before his family relocated to Richmond, Texas, right before he entered high school. He attended George Bush High School. He committed to play college basketball at Richmond over offers from Akron and South Alabama.

== College career ==
Jones played four seasons for the Richmond Spiders, starting his final two. As a sophomore, Jones averaged 10.3 points per game and led the team in 3-pointers made and assists off the bench and was named the Atlantic 10 Conference (A-10) Sixth Man of the Year. As a senior, Jones averaged 16.8 points (ninth in the A-10) and 3.9 assists per game and was named third team All-Atlantic 10. He finished his collegiate career as Richmond's 10th all-time scorer with 1,608 points, 5th in school history with 227 3-pointers made, and 8th with 364 assists.

== Professional career ==
=== Aries Trikala (2017–2018) ===
After going undrafted in the 2017 NBA draft, Jones signed with Aries Trikala of the Greek Basket League on August 29, 2017. He averaged 12 points, 1.5 rebounds, and 3.4 assists over 16 GBL games in his first professional season as Aries finished last in the league and was relegated to the Greek A2 Basket League.

=== Canton Charge (2018–2019) ===
Jones returned to the US after being selected in the second round of the 2018 NBA G League draft by the Canton Charge. He was initially waived by the Charge as part of final roster cuts on November 1, 2018, but was claimed by the team on December 12, 2018. He played in three games for the Charge, averaging 3.7 points and 1.0 assist in 10.1 minutes per game before being waived again by the team on January 9, 2019, in order to make room on the roster for newly acquired Chance Comanche.

=== Northern Arizona Suns (2019–2020) ===
Jones was claimed off waivers by the Northern Arizona Suns on January 23, 2019. He averaged 7.1 points, 1.5 rebounds, and 4.7 assists over 15 games (2 starts) for the Suns and 6.6 points and 4.1 assists in 18 total G League games for the season.

=== Motor City Cruise (2021–2024) ===
Jones was added to the Motor City Cruise in October 2021.
