= Charles Cooke (basketball) =

American basketball player (born 1994)

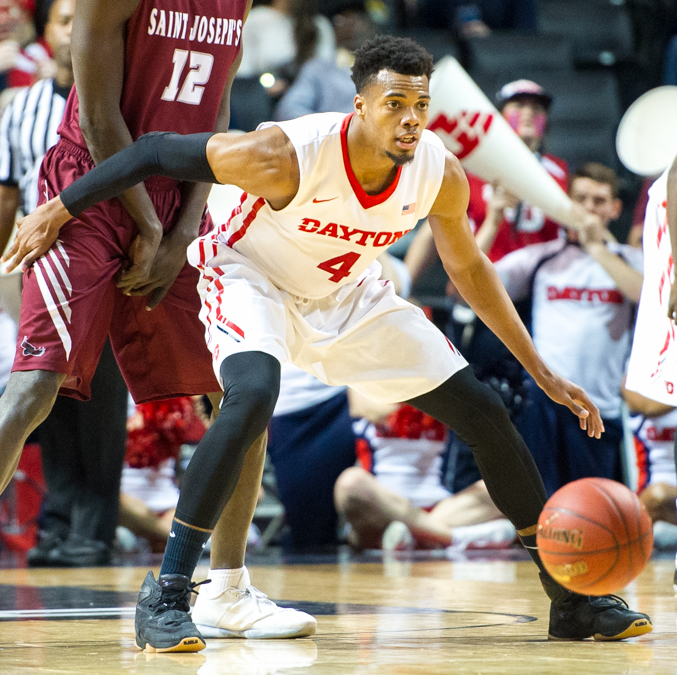
- Cooke playing for Dayton in 2016

Personal information
- Born: July 1, 1994 (age 32) Trenton, New Jersey, U.S.
- Listed height: 6 ft 5 in (1.96 m)
- Listed weight: 196 lb (89 kg)

Career information
- High school: Trenton Catholic (Trenton, New Jersey)
- College: James Madison (2012–2014); Dayton (2015–2017)
- NBA draft: 2017: undrafted
- Playing career: 2017–2022
- Position: Shooting guard
- Number: 4

Career history
- 2017–2018: New Orleans Pelicans
- 2017–2018: →Greensboro Swarm
- 2018: →Salt Lake City Stars
- 2018–2019: Sioux Falls Skyforce
- 2019–2020: De' Longhi Treviso
- 2020: Atléticos de San Germán
- 2021: Hamilton Honey Badgers
- 2022: Maine Celtics
- 2022: Sioux Falls Skyforce
- Stats at NBA.com
- Stats at Basketball Reference

Charles Cooke III (born July 1, 1994) is an American former professional basketball player. He played college basketball for the James Madison Dukes and Dayton Flyers.

== High school career ==
Throughout his high school years, he played basketball at the Trenton Catholic Academy in his home state. In his junior year, he averaged 6.8 points and 0.7 rebounds per game in 23 games played there. During his senior year, he increased his production to 14.1 points and 1.0 rebounds per game in 28 games played. After graduating from high school, he committed to playing for James Madison University at the Colonial Athletic Association.

== College career ==
In his freshman season, he averaged 5.8 points and 2.8 rebounds per game in 32 games played for the Dukes. He improved his production in his sophomore year, averaging 14.3 points, 5.0 rebounds, 1.7 assists, and 1.4 steals per game in 30 games played for James Madison. After his sophomore season, he sat out what would have originally been his junior year to transfer to the University of Dayton at the Atlantic 10 Conference. In his first season at Dayton, Cooke averaged 15.6 points, 5.8 rebounds, 1.8 assists, 1.3 steals, and 1.2 blocks per game in 32 games played. Finally, in his senior year, he averaged 15.8 points, 5.1 rebounds, 2.8 assists, 1.1 steals, and 1.0 blocks per game in 29 games played. During his time at Dayton, he became the only player to have two seasons with averages of 1 assist, 1 steal, and 1 block per game with 37.5% three-point shooting and 5 free-throw attempts per game.

== Professional career ==
While he was originally projected to be a second round pick in the 2017 NBA draft, he ultimately went undrafted. After the draft, he played with the Minnesota Timberwolves for the 2017 NBA Summer League, with the intent on signing with them afterwards. In the five games he played for the Timberwolves, he recorded 10 points, 3 rebounds, and 1 steal per game in 20.8 minutes of action. Cooke ultimately wouldn't sign a deal with the Timberwolves. Instead, on August 2, 2017, Cooke signed a two-way contract with the New Orleans Pelicans. That meant for the majority of the season, Cooke would split his professional time between the New Orleans squad and a G-League affiliate that's going to be best designated to them by the league before the season begins, which turned out to be the Greensboro Swarm. He made his NBA debut on October 28, 2017, playing in two minutes and scoring two points in a blowout 123–101 win over the Cleveland Cavaliers.

On October 7, 2018, Cooke signed with the Miami Heat. He was waived by the Heat on October 11 after appearing in one preseason game. Cooke was subsequently added to the roster of the Sioux Falls Skyforce. On March 15, 2019, Cooke signed a 10-day contract with the Miami Heat, and was immediately assigned back to the Skyforce.

On August 31, 2019, De' Longhi Treviso of the Italian Lega Basket Serie A (LBA), but released at mid-season, replaced by Ivan Almeida.

After the short Italian stint, Cooke signed in Puerto Rico for the Atléticos de San Germán as first team's import player of the 2020 season.

On June 1, 2021, Cooke signed with the Hamilton Honey Badgers of the Canadian Elite Basketball League.

On February 15, 2022, Cooke was acquired and activated by the Maine Celtics, but was waived on March 2.

== NBA career statistics ==
Legend
GP	Games played	GS	Games started	MPG	Minutes per game
FG%	Field goal percentage	3P%	3-point field goal percentage	FT%	Free throw percentage
RPG	Rebounds per game	APG	Assists per game	SPG	Steals per game
BPG	Blocks per game	PPG	Points per game	**Bold**	Career high

=== Regular season ===
Year	Team	GP	GS	MPG	FG%	3P%	FT%	RPG	APG	SPG	BPG	PPG
2017–18	New Orleans	13	0	2.9	.143	.125	.500	.2	.1	.1	.0	.5
Career		13	0	2.9	.143	.125	.500	.2	.1	.1	.0	.5
