= Fordham Rams men's basketball statistical leaders =

Fordham basketball team statistics

The Fordham Rams men's basketball statistical leaders are individual statistical leaders of the Fordham Rams basketball program in various categories, including points, rebounds, assists, steals, and blocks. Within those areas, the lists identify single-game, single-season, and career leaders. The Rams represent Fordham University in the NCAA's Atlantic 10 Conference.

Fordham began competing in intercollegiate basketball in 1902. However, the school's record book does not generally list records from before the 1950s, as records from before this period are often incomplete and inconsistent. Since scoring was much lower in this era, and teams played much fewer games during a typical season, it is likely that few or no players from this era would appear on these lists anyway.

The NCAA did not officially record assists as a stat until the 1983–84 season, and blocks and steals until the 1985–86 season, but Fordham's record books includes players in these stats before these seasons. These lists are updated through the end of the 2020–21 season.

== Scoring ==
Career
Rk	Player	Points	Seasons
1	Ed Conlin	1,886	1951–52 1952–53 1953–54 1954–55
2	Bryant Dunston	1,832	2004–05 2005–06 2006–07 2007–08
3	Bevon Robin	1,793	1997–98 1998–99 1999–2000 2000–01
4	Joe Paterno	1,776	1985–86 1986–87 1987–88 1988–89
5	Jim Cunningham	1,744	1955–56 1956–57 1957–58
6	Marcus Stout	1,709	2004–05 2005–06 2006–07 2007–08
7	Ken Charles	1,697	1970–71 1971–72 1972–73
8	Chris Gaston	1,672	2009–10 2010–11 2011–12 2012–13
9	Branden Frazier	1,642	2010–11 2011–12 2012–13 2013–14
10	Brenton Butler	1,524	2006–07 2007–08 2008–09 2009–10 2010–11

Season
Rk	Player	Points	Season
1	Ken Charles	679	1972-73
2	Charlie Yelverton	676	1970–71
3	Ed Conlin	675	1954–55
4	Jackie Johnson III	642	2024–25
5	Jim Cunningham	639	1956–57
6	Jim Cunningham	627	1957–58
7	Tony McIntosh	592	1984–85
8	Ed Conlin	587	1953–54
9	Damon Lopez	584	1990–91
10	Joe Paterno	579	1988–89

Single game
Rk	Player	Points	Season	Opponent
1	Charlie Yelverton	46	1970–71	Rochester
1	Chuck Rolles	46	1971–72	St. Peter's
3	Bill Langheld	44	1966–67	Manhattan
4	Ed Conlin	42	1953–54	Adelphi
5	Ken Charles	41	1972-73	Massachusetts

== Rebounds ==
Career
Rk	Player	Rebounds	Seasons
1	Ed Conlin	1,930	1951–52 1952–53 1953–54 1954–55
2	Dan Lyons	1,049	1951–52 1952–53 1953–54 1954–55
3	Chris Gaston	1,038	2009–10 2010–11 2011–12 2012–13
4	Bryant Dunston	993	2004–05 2005–06 2006–07 2007–08
5	Bill McCadney	968	1955–56 1956–57 1957–58
6	Ryan Rhoomes	936	2012–13 2013–14 2014–15 2015–16
7	John Stevens	917	1962–63 1963–64 1964–65
8	Darryl Brown	807	1972–73 1973–74 1974–75
9	Damon Lopez	756	1988–89 1989–90 1990–91
10	Chuba Ohams	745	2016–17 2017–18 2018–19 2019–20 2020–21 2021–22

Season
Rk	Player	Rebounds	Season
1	Ed Conlin	612	1952–53
2	Ed Conlin	578	1954–55
3	Fred Christ	465	1950–51
4	Ed Conlin	417	1953–54
5	John Stevens	405	1964–65
6	Dan Lyons	400	1962–63
7	Bill Carlson	391	1950–51
8	Dan Lyons	388	1952–53
9	Bill McCadney	379	1957–58
10	Bill Carlson	352	1951–52

Single game
Rk	Player	Rebounds	Season	Opponent
1	Ed Conlin	36	1952–53	Colgate
2	Ed Conlin	32	1954–55	NYU
	Ed Conlin	32	1952–53	Army
4	Ed Conlin	31	1954–55	Villanova
	Ed Conlin	31	1952–53	St. Peter's

== Assists ==
Career
Rk	Player	Assists	Seasons
1	Jay Fazande	548	1989–90 1990–91 1991–92 1992–93
2	Branden Frazier	495	2009–10 2010–11 2011–12 2012–13
3	Jean Prioleau	453	1988–89 1989–90 1990–91 1991–92
4	Bevon Robin	443	1997–98 1998–99 1999–2000 2000–01
5	Joseph Chartouny	439	2015–16 2016–17 2017–18
6	Dave Maxwell	416	1979–80 1980–81 1981–82 1982–83
7	Rob Baxter	383	1991–92 1992–93 1993–94 1994–95 1995–96
8	Dave Maxwell	374	1979–80 1980–81 1981–82 1982–83
9	Jerry Hobbie	366	1981–82 1982–83 1983–84 1984–85
10	Tony McIntosh	347	1981–82 1982–83 1983–84 1984–85

Season
Rk	Player	Assists	Season
1	Jay Fazande	188	1992–93
2	Jerry Hobbie	180	1984–85
	Rob Baxter	180	1993–94
4	Jay Fazande	168	1991–92
5	Jack Burik	161	1970–71
	Joseph Chartouny	161	2015–16
7	Branden Frazier	154	2012–13
	Christian Henry	154	2025–26
9	Mike Rice	152	1990–91
10	Bevon Robin	148	2000–01

Single game
Rk	Player	Assists	Season	Opponent
1	Jerry Hobbie	15	1984–85	La Salle
2	Joseph Chartouny	14	2016–17	NYIT
	Rob Baxter	14	1993–94	Army
	Kevin Brown	14	1973–74	CCNY
5	Jay Fazande	13	1993–93	Colgate
	Jay Fazande	13	1993–93	Holy Cross
7	Jay Fazande	12	1990–91	Xavier
	Mark Taylor	12	1987–88	Army
	Jay Fazande	12	1992–93	St. John's

== Steals ==
Career
Rk	Player	Steals	Seasons
1	Jerry Hobbie	261	1981–82 1982–83 1983–84 1984–85
2	Jean Prioleau	251	1988–89 1989–90 1990–91 1991–92
3	Joseph Chartouny	247	2015–16 2016–17 2017–18
4	Jason Harris	227	1997–98 1998–99 1999–2000 2000–01
5	Kyle Rose	219	2019-20 2020-21 2021-22 2022-23 2023–24
6	Dave Maxwell	217	1979–80 1980–81 1981–82 1982–83
7	Mandell Thomas	198	2012–13 2013–14 2014–15 2015–16
8	Joe Paterno	187	1985–86 1986–87 1987–88 1988–89
9	Bevon Robin	173	1997–98 1998–99 1999–2000 2000–01
10	Teremun Johnson	170	1998–99 1999–2000 2000–01 2001–02

Season
Rk	Player	Steals	Season
1	Joseph Chartouny	97	2017–18
2	Joseph Chartouny	94	2016–17
3	Jason Harris	78	1999–2000
4	Jerry Hobbie	75	1984–85
5	Jean Prioleau	74	1991–92
6	Mandell Thomas	73	2014–15
7	Jason Harris	71	2000–01
8	Kyle Rose	70	2023–24
9	Dave Maxwell	66	1982–83
	Jerry Hobbie	66	1983–84
	Damon Lopez	66	1990–91

Single game
Rk	Player	Steals	Season	Opponent
1	Jason Harris	9	1999–2000	Holy Cross
2	Joe Paterno	8	1987–88	Seton Hall
	Jason Harris	8	2001–02	Siena
4	Joseph Chartouny	7	2016–17	Rutgers
	Jason Harris	7	1999–2000	Tulane
	Jerry Hobbie	7	1984–85	LaSalle
	Damon Lopez	7	1990–91	Holy Cross
	Dustin Berrien	7	1995–96	Fairfield

== Blocks ==
Career
Rk	Player	Blocks	Seasons
1	Bryant Dunston	292	2004–05 2005–06 2006–07 2007–08
2	Damon Lopez	252	1988–89 1989–90 1990–91
3	Dud Tongal	217	1978–79 1979–80 1980–81 1981–82
4	Abdou Tsimbila	207	2021-22 2022-23 2023–24 2024–25
5	Chris Gaston	160	2009–10 2010–11 2011–12 2012–13
6	Ryan Rhoomes	146	2012–13 2013–14 2014–15 2015–16
7	Kervin Bristol	122	2010–11 2011–12
8	Chuba Ohams	112	2016–17 2017–18 2018–19 2019–20 2020–21 2021–22
9	Sanford Jenkins	111	1988–89 1989–90 1990–91 1991–92
10	Ed Bona	108	1979–80 1980–81 1981–82 1982–83

Season
Rk	Player	Blocks	Season
1	Damon Lopez	100	1990–91
2	Damon Lopez	91	1989–90
3	Bryant Dunston	79	2007–08
4	Bryant Dunston	75	2005–06
5	Dud Tongal	72	1978–79
	Abdou Tsimbila	72	2023–24
7	Bryant Dunston	71	2006–07
8	Kervin Bristol	69	2011–12
9	Damon Lopez	67	1988–89
	Bryant Dunston	67	2004–05

Single game
Rk	Player	Blocks	Season	Opponent
1	Damon Lopez	10	1990–91	Lehigh
	Damon Lopez	10	1989–90	Army
	Dud Tongal	10	1978–79	Brandeis
4	Abdou Tsimbila	9	2023–24	NJIT
5	Damon Lopez	8	1989–90	Navy
	Damon Lopez	8	1989–90	Manhattan
	Bryant Dunston	8	2005–06	Rhode Island
	Bryant Dunston	8	2007–08	Duquesne
	Kervin Bristol	8	2010–11	Charlotte
	Kervin Bristol	8	2011–12	Charlotte
	Chuba Ohams	8	2021–22	Duquesne
