= Haggerty Award =

NCAA college basketball award

- Awarded for: the New York area's top NCAA Division I men's college basketball player
- Location: New York metropolitan area
- Country: United States
- Presented by: MBWA

History
- First award: 1936
- Most recent: Zuby Ejiofor, St. John's
- Website: Official website

The Lt. Frank J. Haggerty Award is given to the top men's college basketball player from an NCAA Division I school in the New York metropolitan area. The Haggerty Award is presented by the Metropolitan Basketball Writers Association (MBWA). First awarded in 1936, it is the oldest and arguably most prestigious award given to a metropolitan area player. It is named after Frank J. Haggerty, a basketball and baseball star athlete from Long Island, New York who "was the first graduate of both Chaminade High School and St. John's University to die in military service during World War II … The Fathers Club of the Mineola school, to honor Haggerty, class of 1936, introduced a basketball tournament in his memory," according to the MBWA's website.

The Haggerty Award has gone to players from 15 schools. St. John's in Jamaica, New York has the most at 29, roughly twice the 15 awards received by players from number two Seton Hall. The players on this list who represent modern day non-Division I schools are five players from NYU (Ben Auerbach, Sid Tanenbaum, Dolph Schayes, Satch Sanders, and Barry Kramer) and one player from CCNY (Bernie Fliegel). At the time of their awards, both NYU and CCNY were classified as Division I schools.

Three players won the award three times: Jim McMillian of Columbia (1968–1970), Chris Mullin of St. John's (1983–1985) and Charles Jenkins of Hofstra (2009–2011). McMillian went on to win the 1972 NBA championship with the Los Angeles Lakers; Mullin went on to win two Olympic gold medals with Team USA (1984, 1992), was a five-time NBA All-Star and was elected to the Naismith Memorial Basketball Hall of Fame in 2011; and Jenkins has played in the NBA and Europe.

== Key ==
†	Co-Players of the Year
*	Awarded a national player of the year award that same season: Helms Foundation College Basketball Player of the Year (until 1979); UPI College Basketball Player of the Year (1954–96); Oscar Robertson Trophy (after 1959); Naismith College Player of the Year (after 1969); John R. Wooden Award (after 1976)
Player (X)	Denotes the number of times the player has been awarded the Haggerty Award at that point

== Winners ==
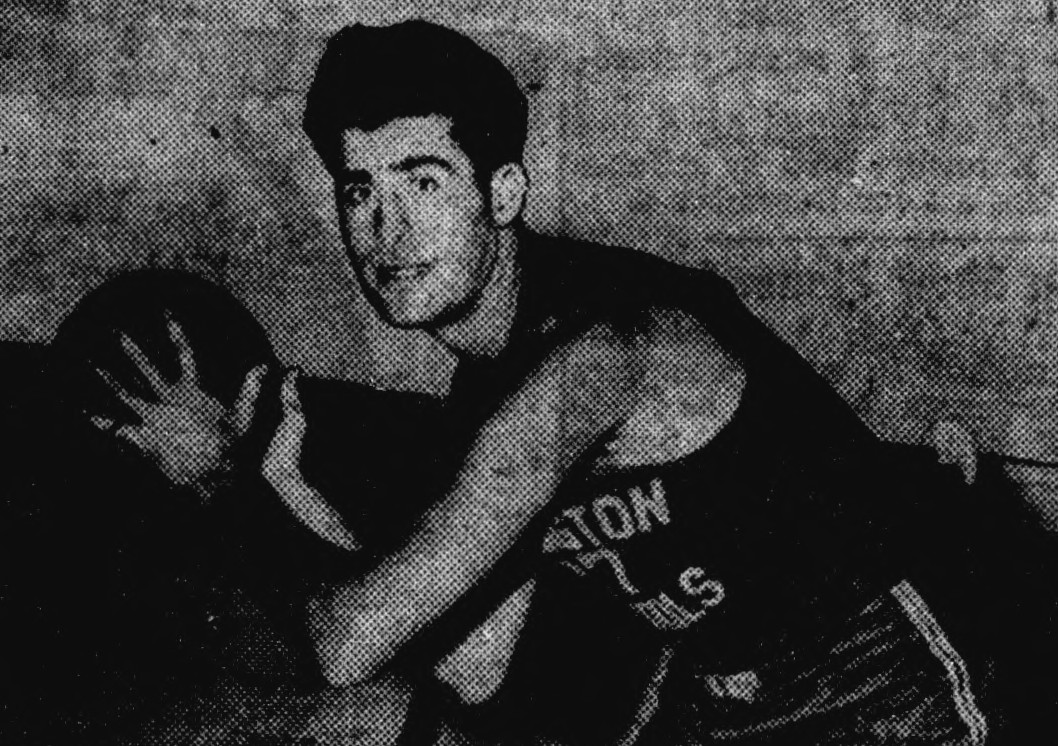
Irv Torgoff, LIU, 1939

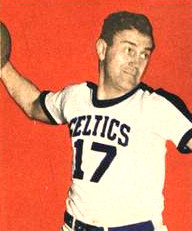
Jack Garfinkel, St. John's, 1941

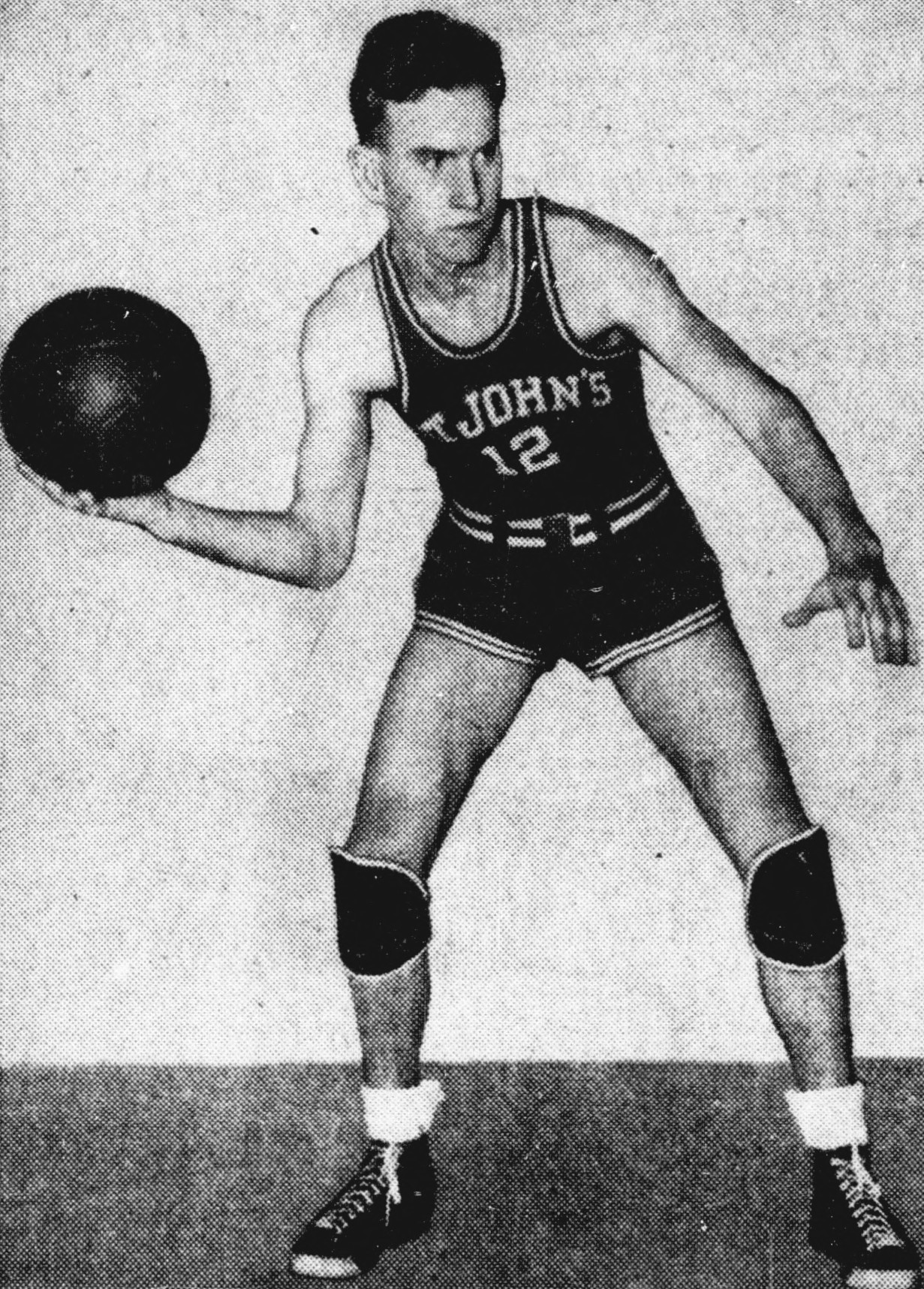
Jim White, St. John's, 1942

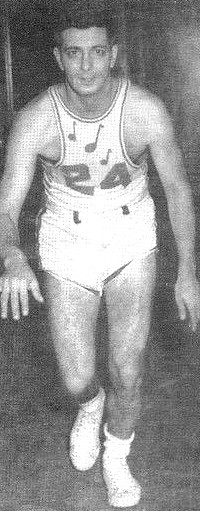
Andrew Levane, St. John's, 1943

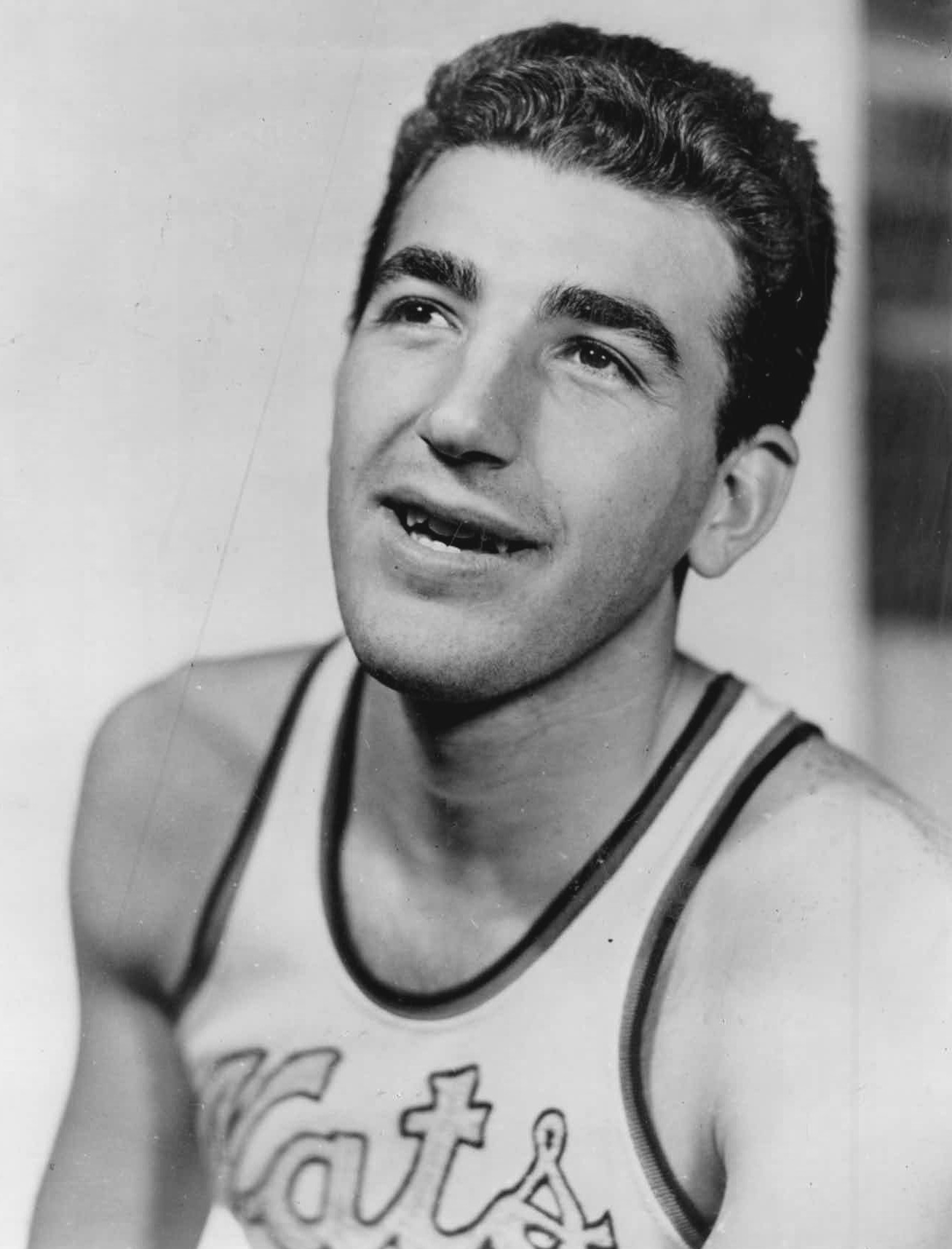
Dolph Schayes, NYU, 1948

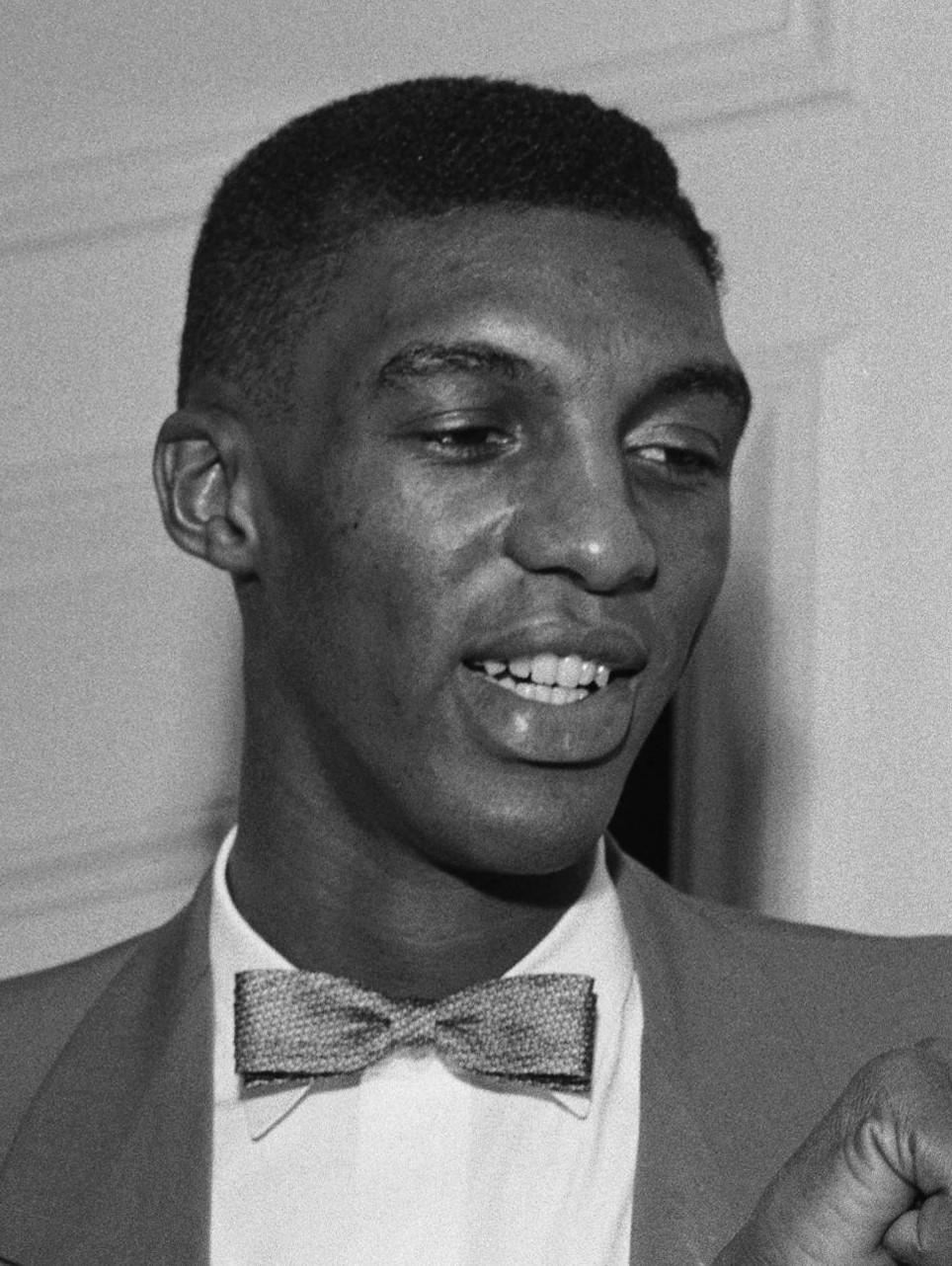
Walter Dukes, Seton Hall, 1953

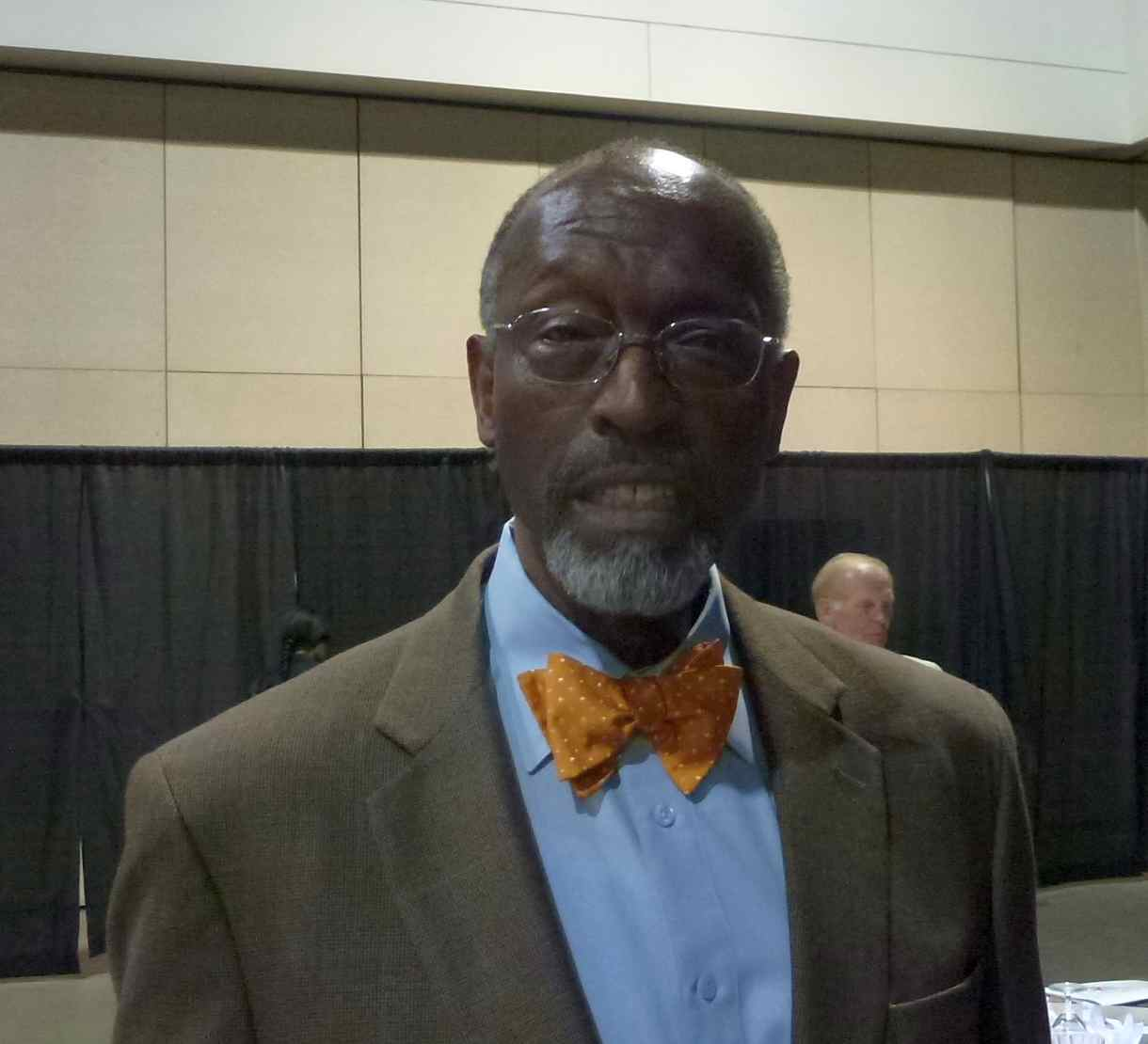
Satch Sanders, NYU, 1960

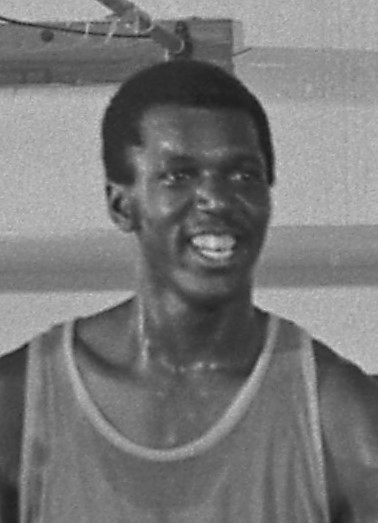
LeRoy Ellis, St. John's, 1962

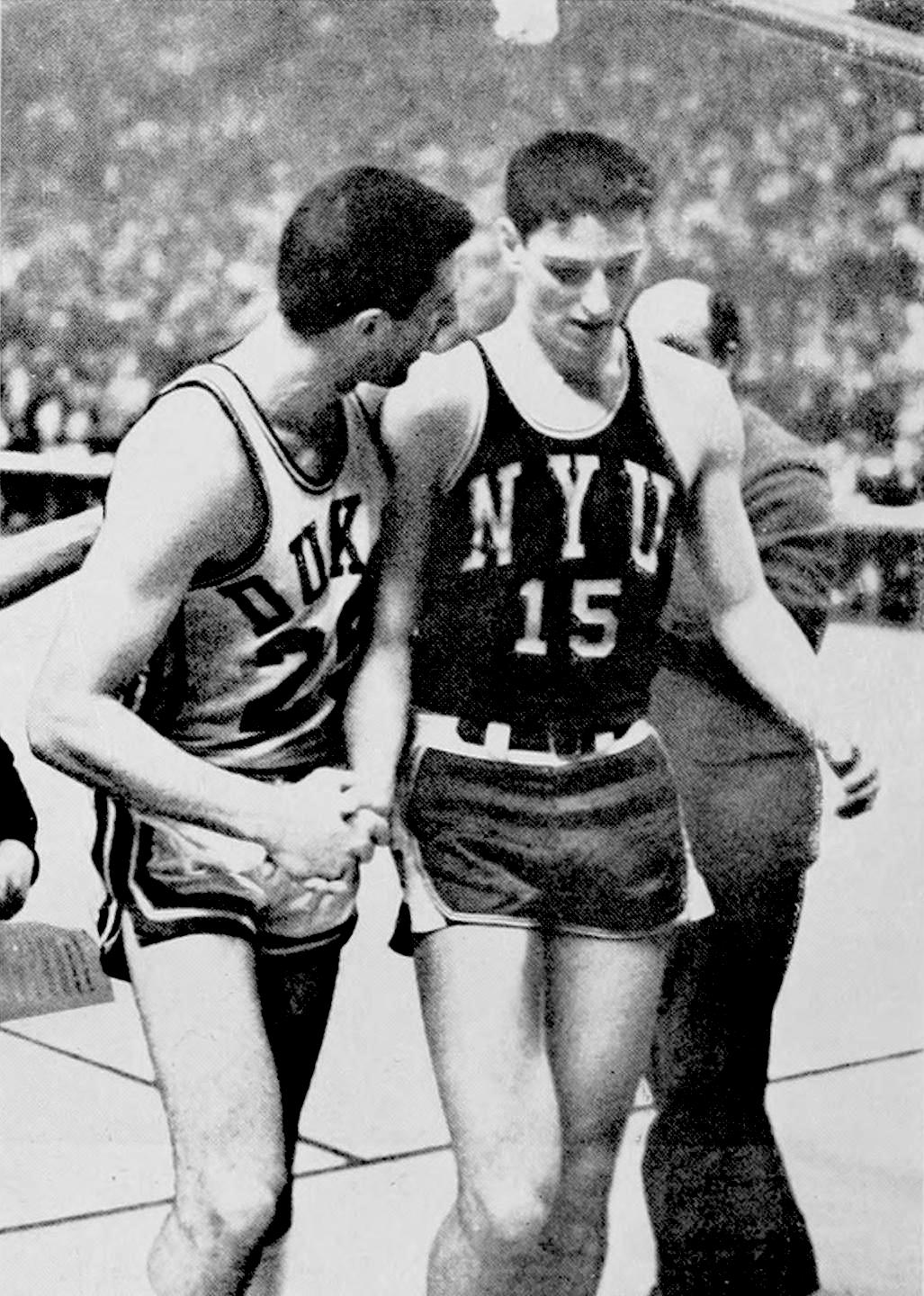
Barry Kramer (r), NYU, 1963

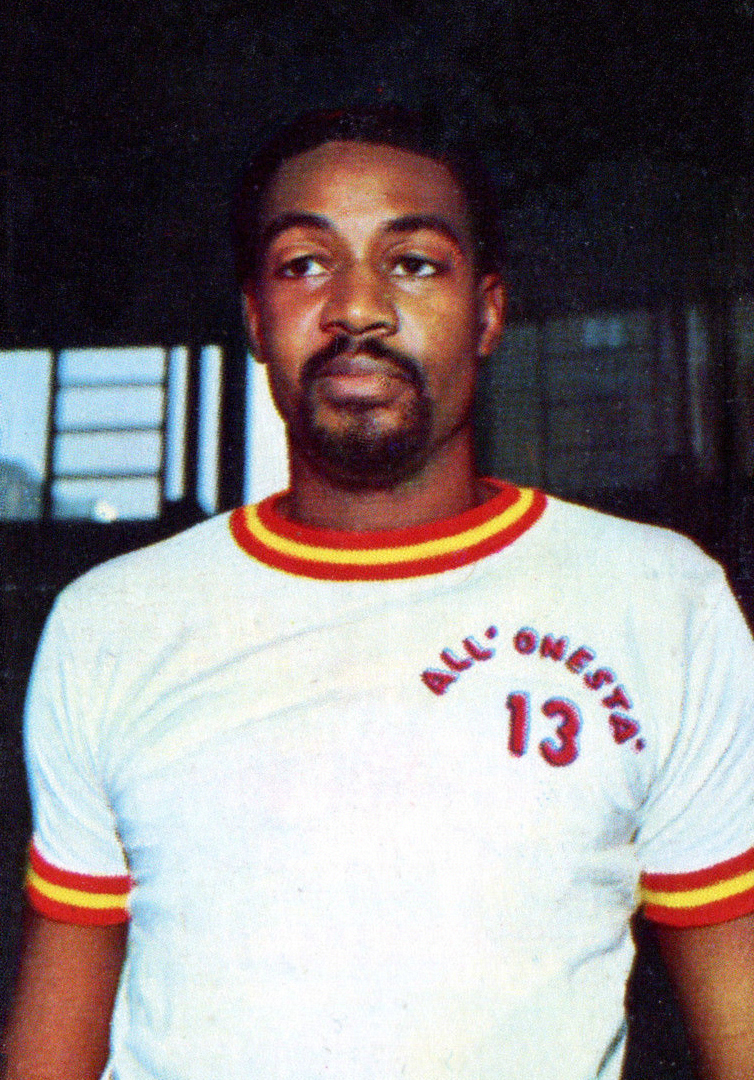
Warren Isaac, Iona, 1965

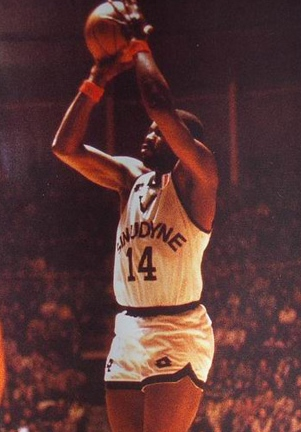
Jim McMillian, Columbia, 1968 through 1970

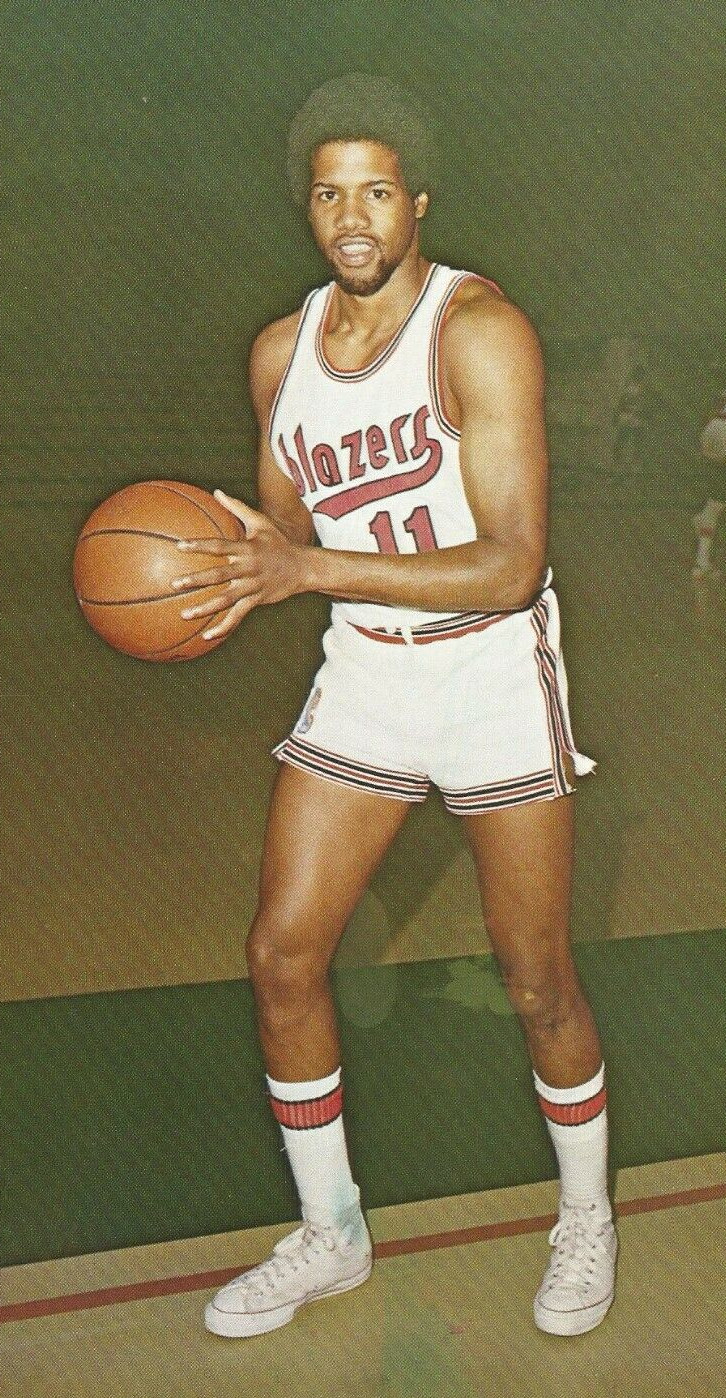
Charlie Yelverton, Fordham, 1971

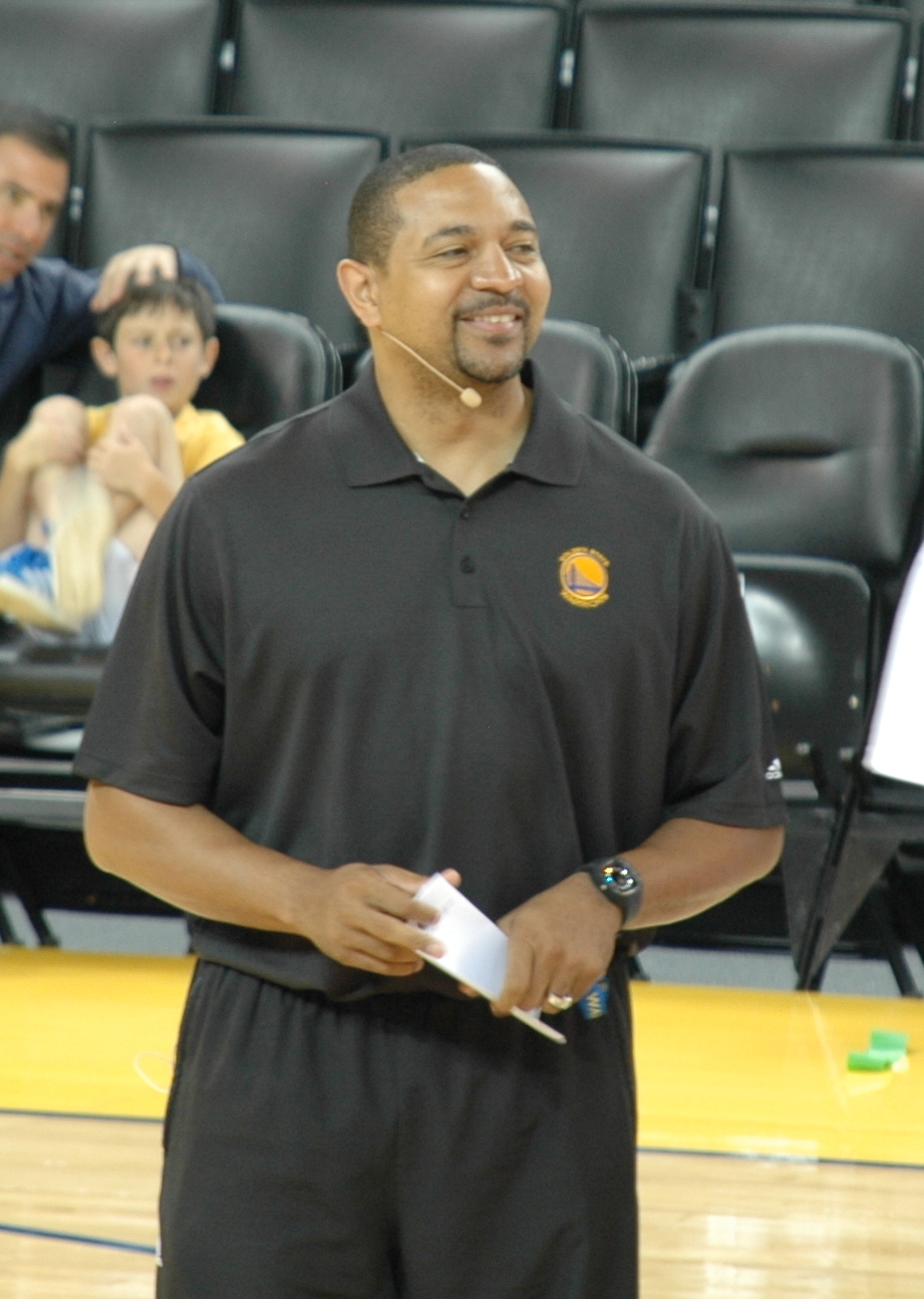
Mark Jackson, St. John's, 1987

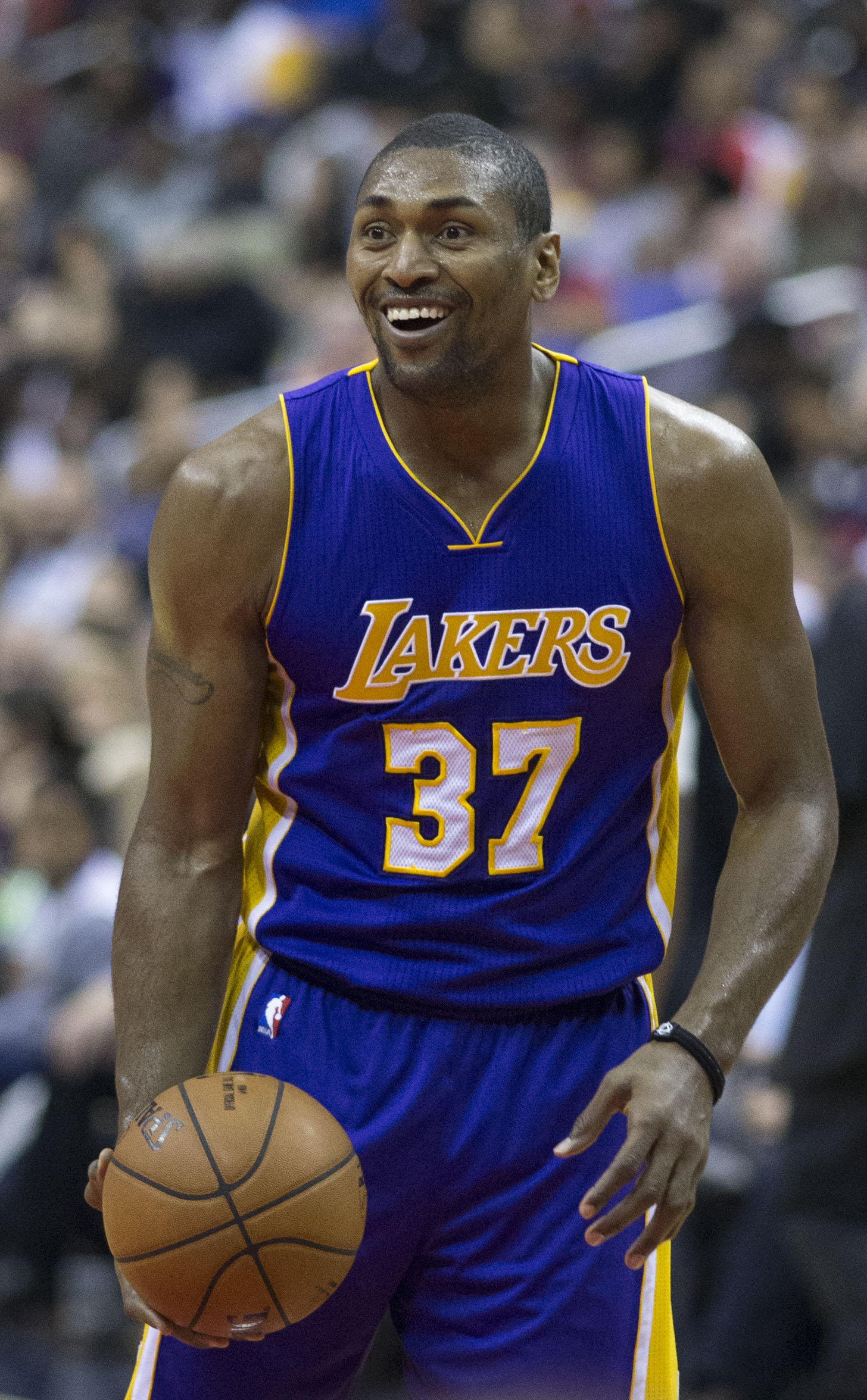
Ron Artest, St. John's, 1999

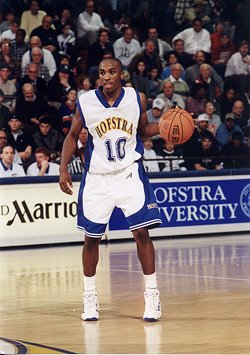
Speedy Claxton, Hofstra, 2000

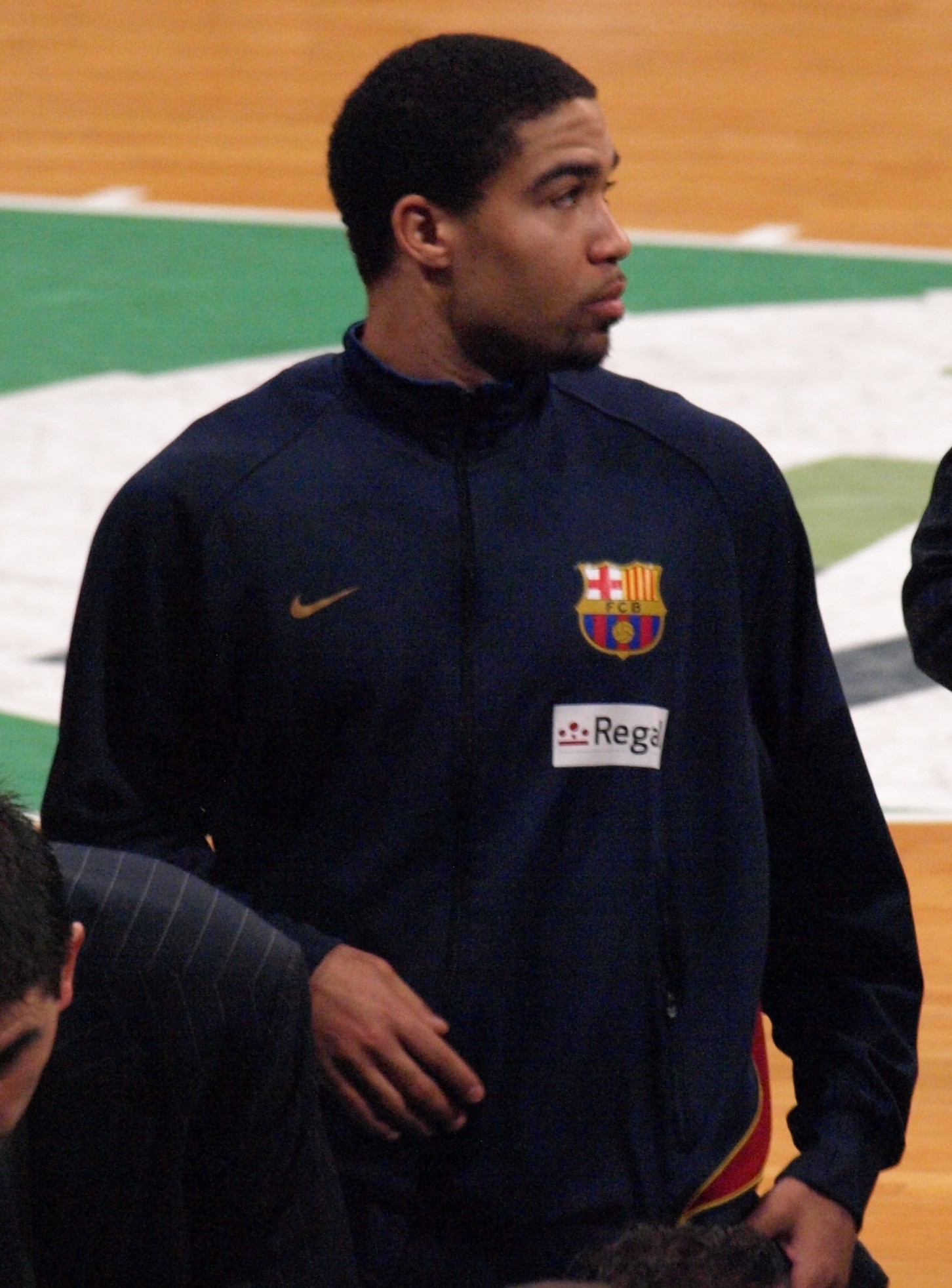
Andre Barrett, Seton Hall, 2004

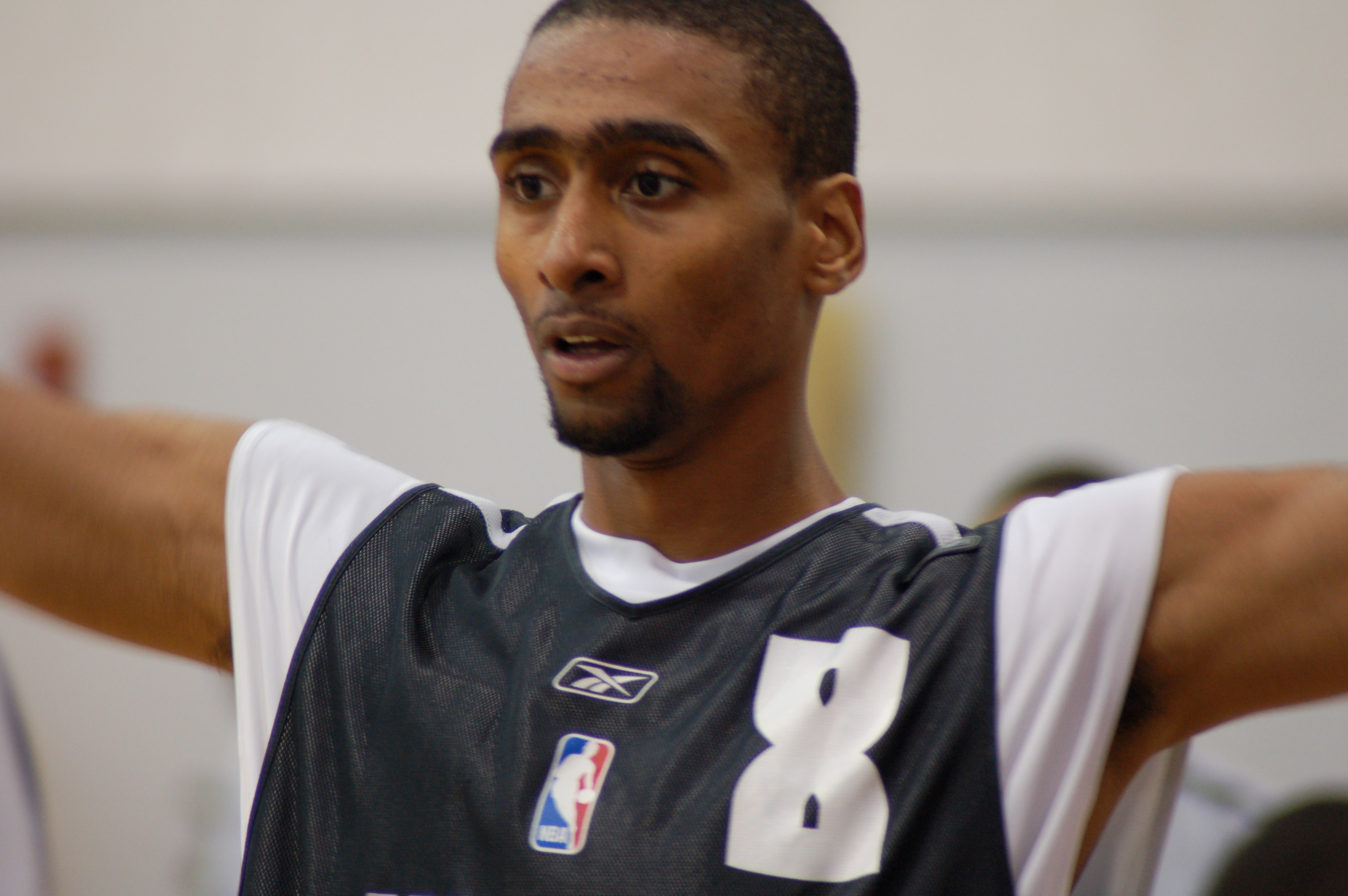
Quincy Douby, Rutgers, 2006

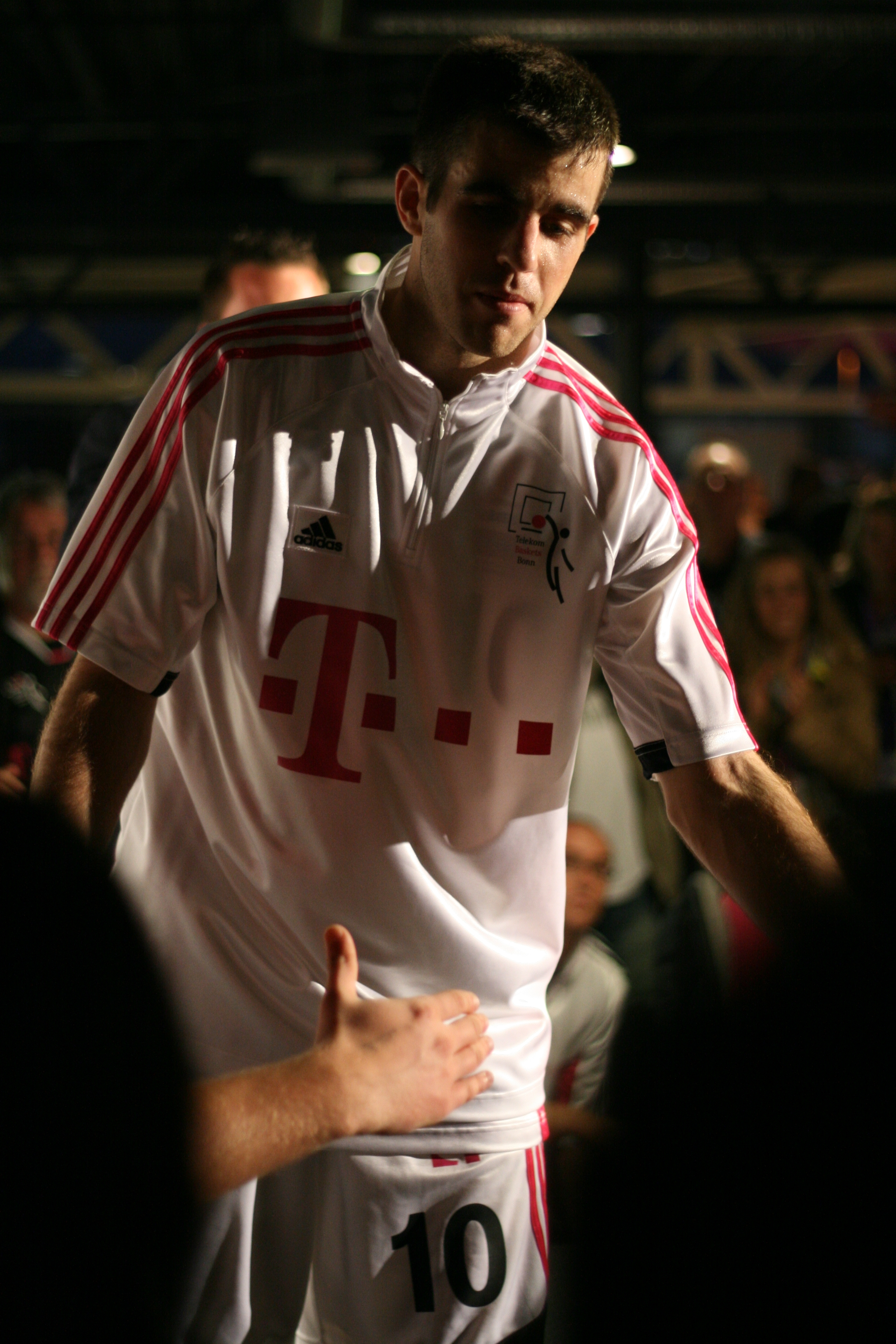
Jared Jordan, Marist, 2007

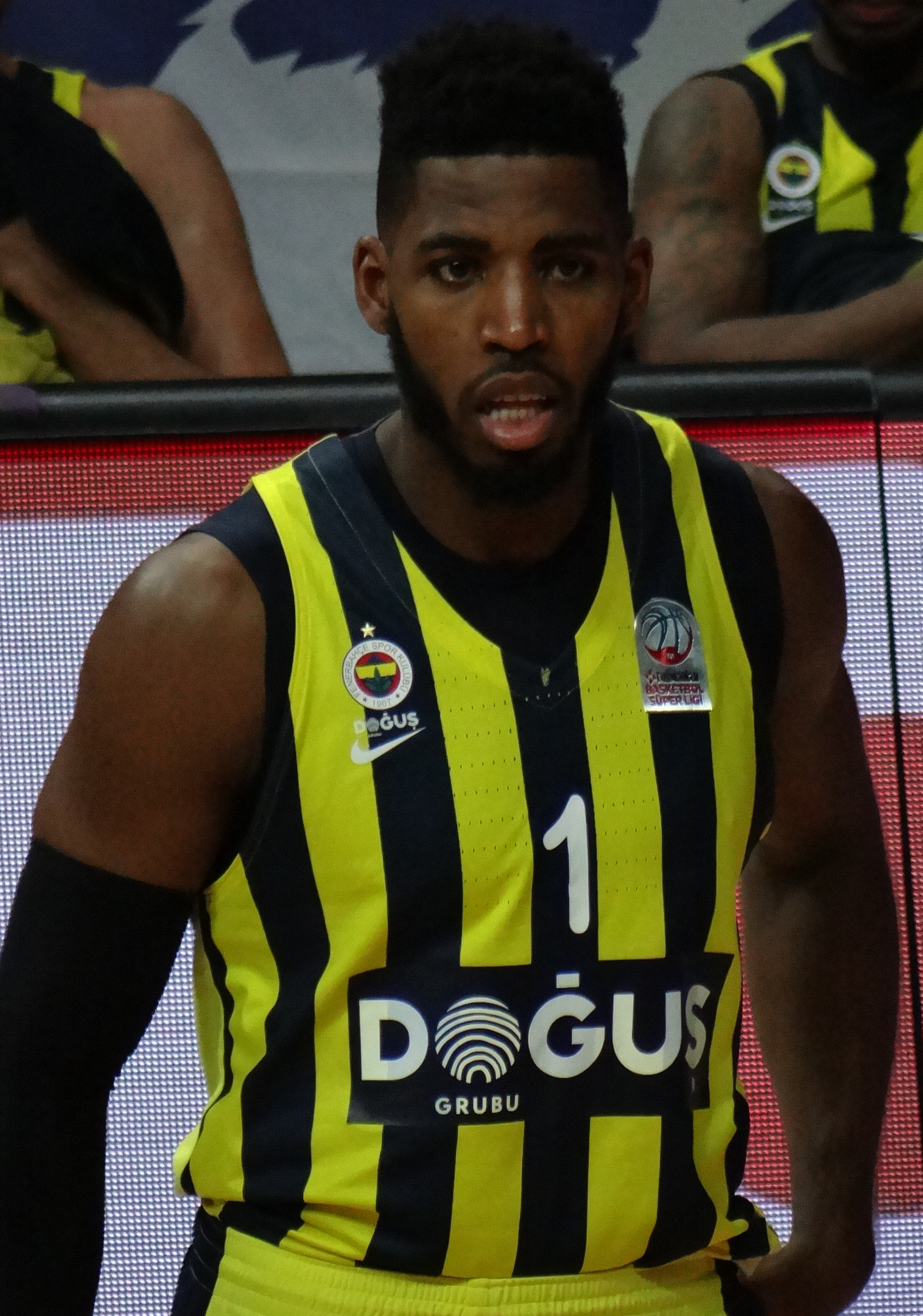
Jason Thompson, Rider, 2008

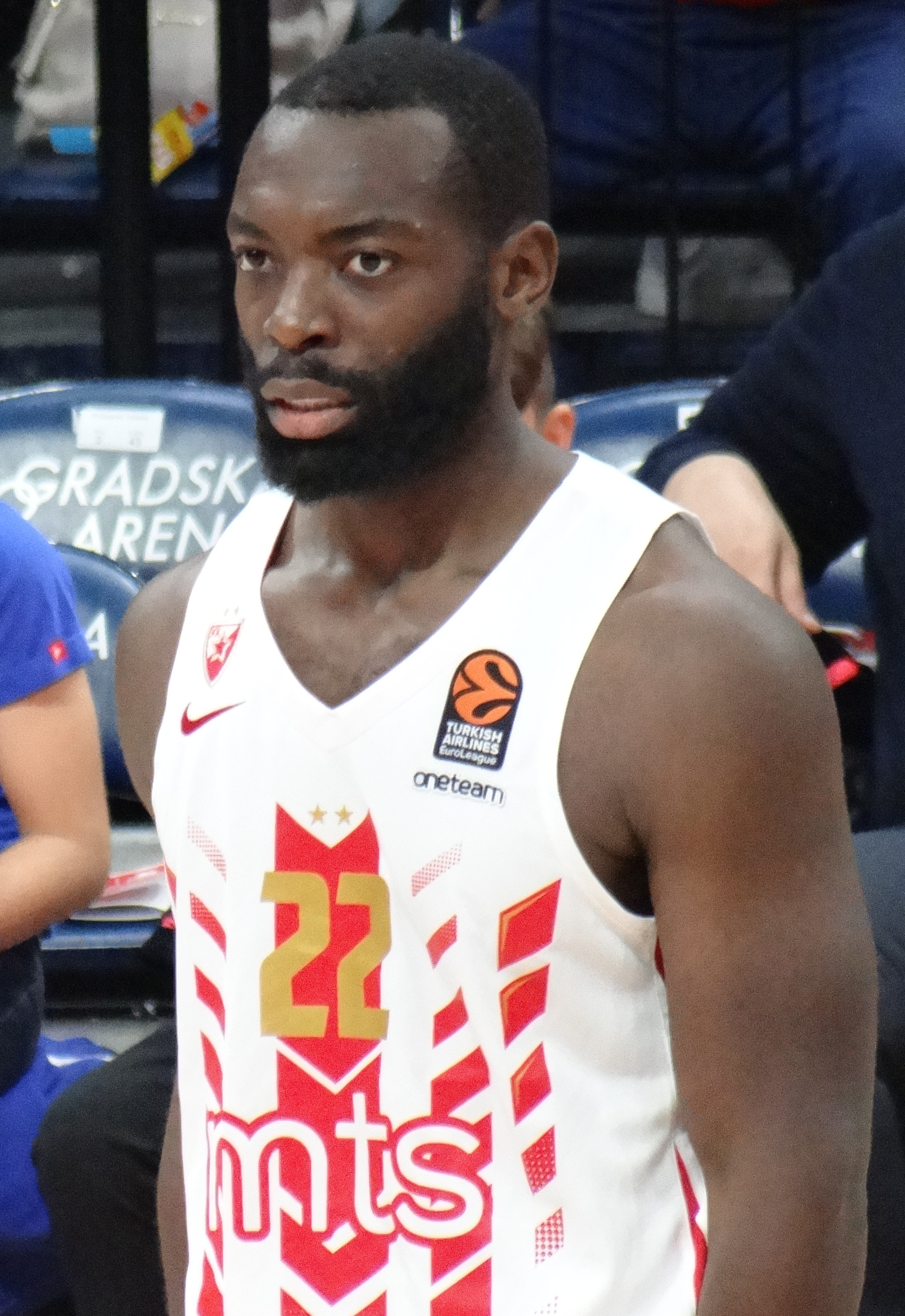
Charles Jenkins, Hofstra, 2009 through 2011

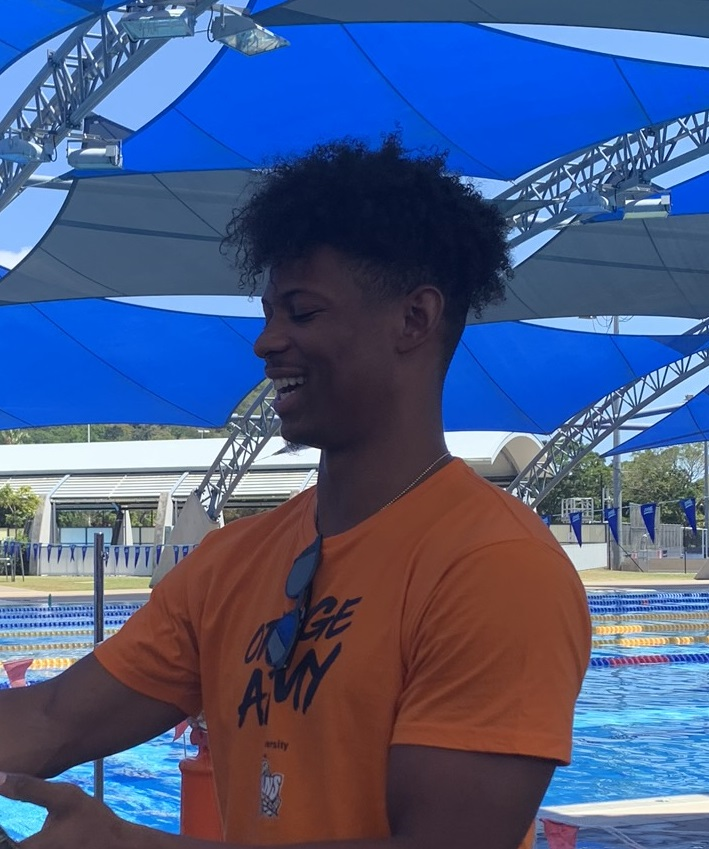
Scott Machado, Iona, 2012

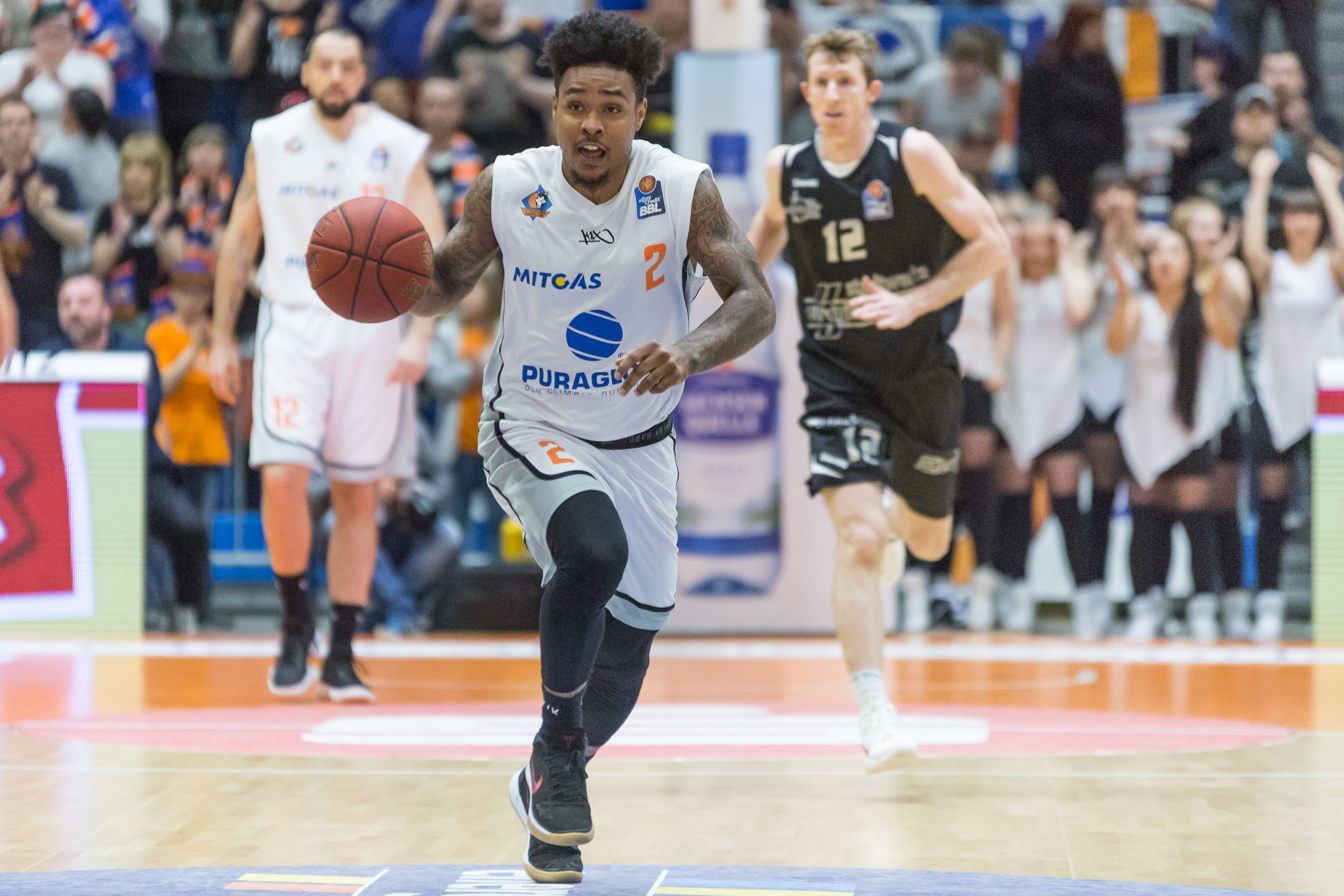
Lamont Jones, Iona, 2013

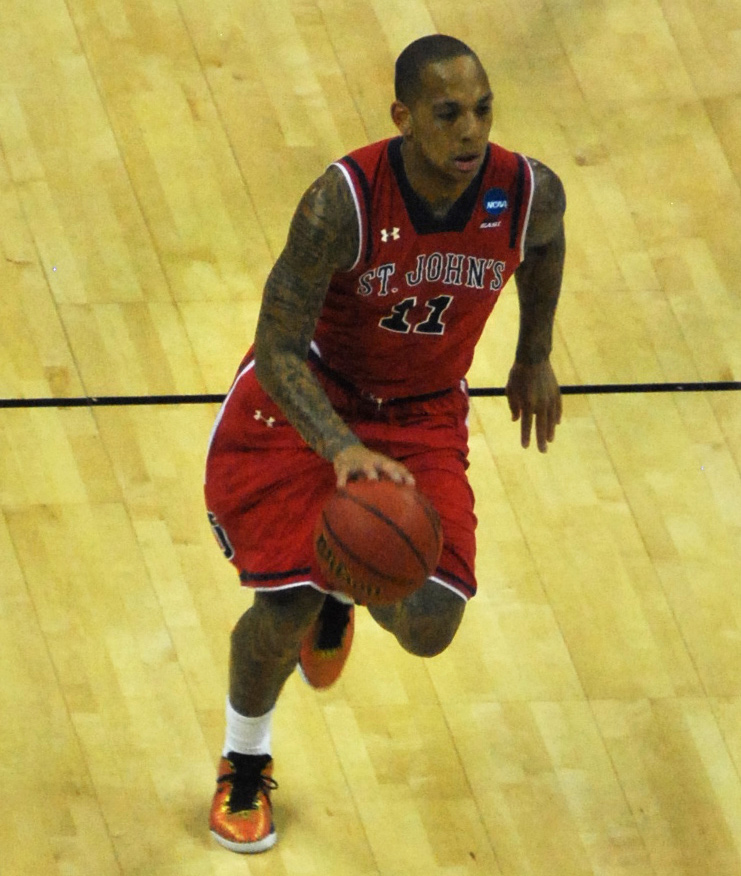
D'Angelo Harrison, St. John's, 2014

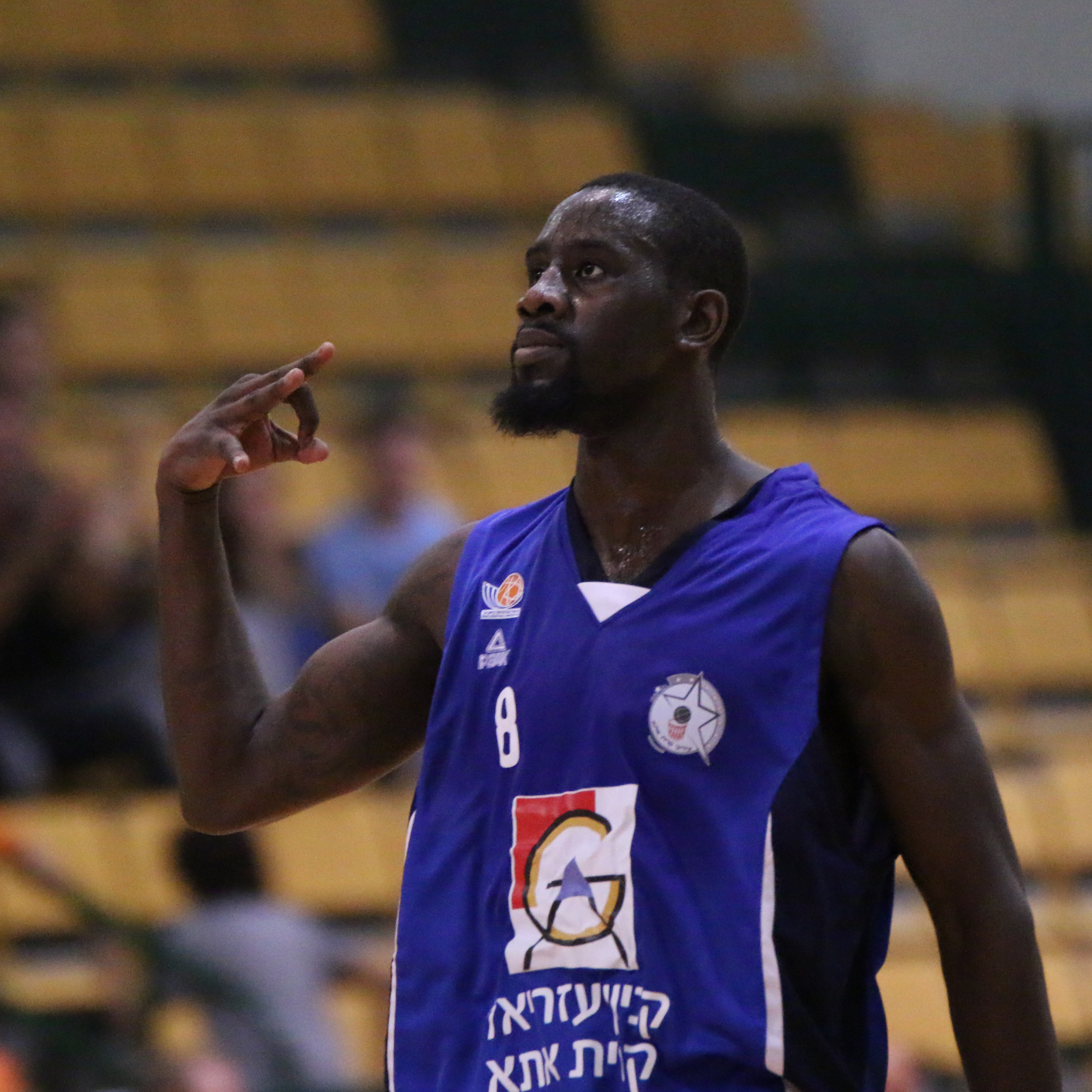
Sir'Dominic Pointer, St. John's, 2015

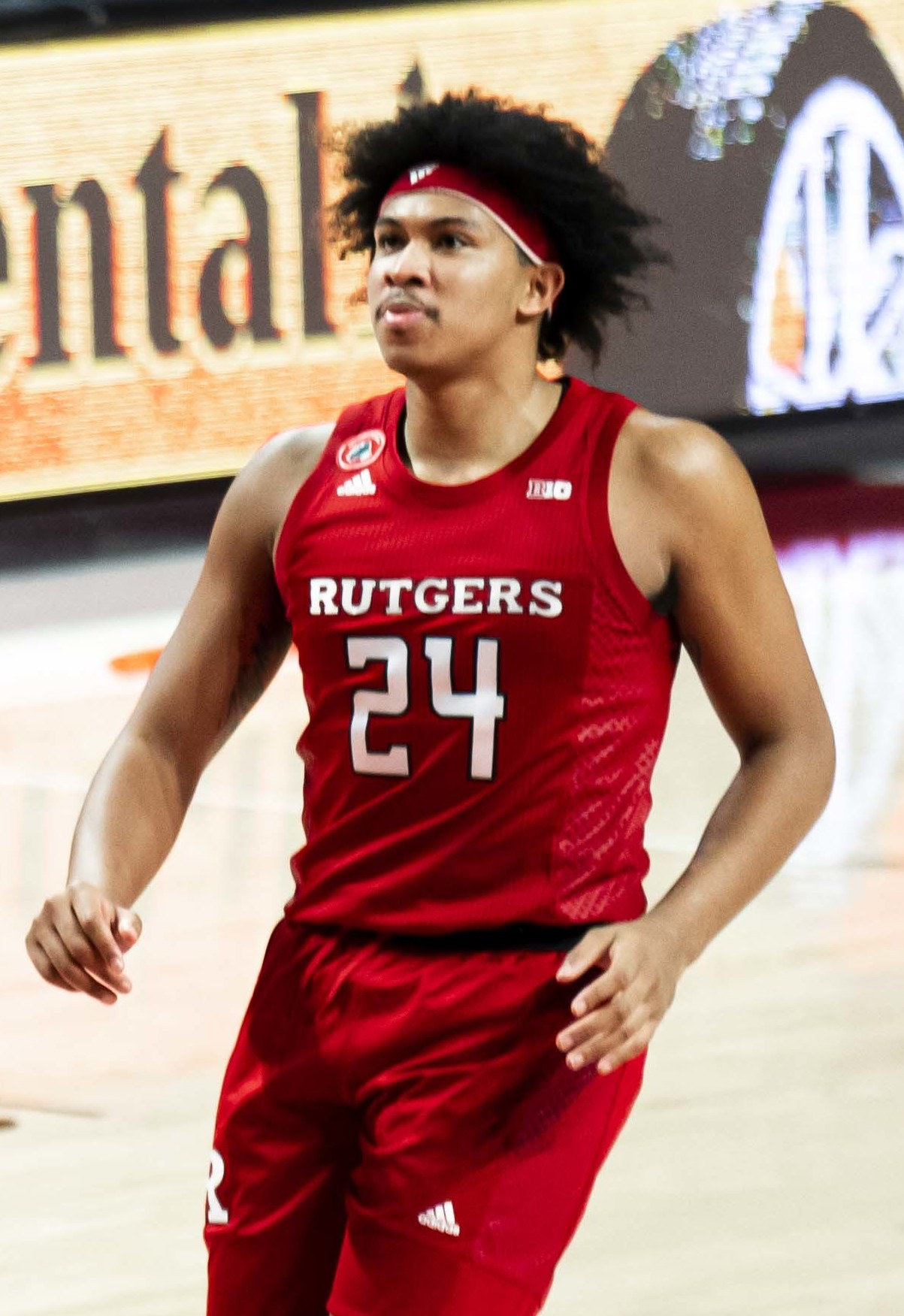
Ron Harper Jr., Rutgers, 2022

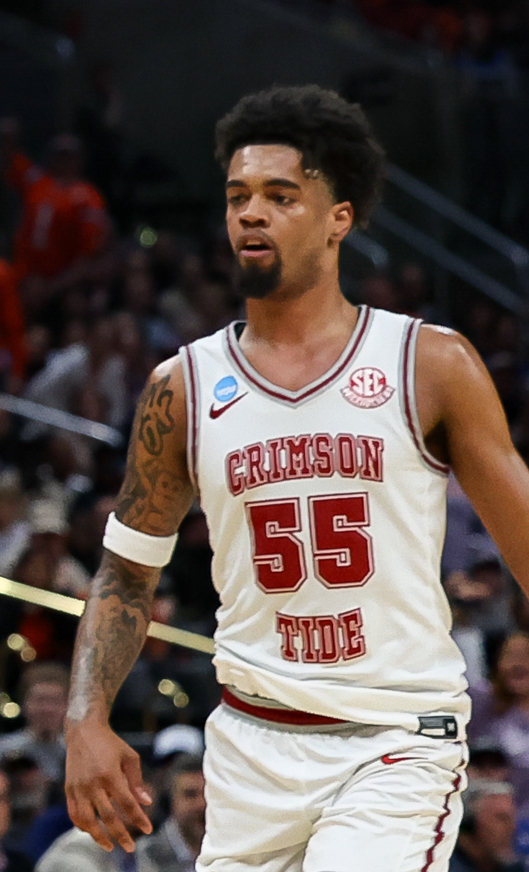
Aaron Estrada, Hofstra, 2023

Season	Player	School	Position	Class	Reference
1935–36	Jules Bender	LIU	F / G	Junior	
1936–37	Ben Kramer	LIU	SF	Senior	
1937–38	Bernie Fliegel	CCNY	C	Senior	
1938–39	Irv Torgoff	LIU	PF	Senior	
1939–40	Ben Auerbach	NYU	SF	Junior	
1940–41	Jack Garfinkel	St. John's	PG	Senior	
1941–42	Jim White	St. John's	G	Senior	
1942–43	Andrew Levane	St. John's	SF / SG	Senior	
1943–44	Dick McGuire	St. John's	PG	Freshman	
1944–45	Bill Kotsores	St. John's	PF	Senior	
1945–46	Sid Tanenbaum	NYU	SG	Junior	
1946–47	Sid Tanenbaum (2)	NYU	SG	Senior	
1947–48	Dolph Schayes	NYU	C	Senior	
1948–49	Dick McGuire (2)	St. John's	PG	Senior	
1949–50	Sherman White	LIU	PF	Junior	
1950–51	John Azary	Columbia	SG	Senior	
1951–52	Ronnie MacGilvray	St. John's	PG	Senior	
1952–53	Walter Dukes	Seton Hall	C	Senior	
1953–54	Ed Conlin	Fordham	PF	Junior	
1954–55	Ed Conlin (2)	Fordham	PF	Senior	
1955–56	Bill Thieben	Hofstra	PF	Senior	
1956–57	Chet Forte*	Columbia	PG	Senior	
1957–58	Jim Cunningham	Fordham	SG	Senior	
1958–59	Al Seiden	St. John's	PG / SG	Senior	
1959–60	Satch Sanders	NYU	PF	Senior	
1960–61	Tony Jackson	St. John's	SF	Senior	
1961–62	LeRoy Ellis	St. John's	C	Senior	
1962–63	Barry Kramer	NYU	PF	Junior	
1963–64	Nick Werkman	Seton Hall	PF	Senior	
1964–65	Warren Isaac	Iona	PF	Senior	
1965–66	Albie Grant	LIU	SF	Senior	
1966–67	Sonny Dove	St. John's	C	Senior	
1967–68	Jim McMillian	Columbia	SF	Sophomore	
1968–69	Jim McMillian (2)	Columbia	SF	Junior	
1969–70	Jim McMillian (3)	Columbia	SF	Senior	
1970–71	Charlie Yelverton	Fordham	SG	Senior	
1971–72^{†}	Richie Garner	Manhattan	SG	Senior	
1971–72^{†}	Tom Sullivan	Fordham	C	Senior	
1972–73	Billy Schaeffer	St. John's	PF	Senior	
1973–74	Bill Campion	Manhattan	C	Junior	
1974–75	Phil Sellers	Rutgers	SG	Junior	
1975–76	Phil Sellers (2)	Rutgers	SG	Senior	
1976–77	Rich Laurel	Hofstra	SG	Senior	
1977–78	George Johnson	St. John's	PF	Senior	
1978–79	Nikos Galis	Seton Hall	SG	Senior	
1979–80	Jeff Ruland	Iona	C	Junior	
1980–81	Gary Springer	Iona	PF	Freshman	
1981–82	Dan Callandrillo	Seton Hall	SG	Senior	
1982–83	Chris Mullin	St. John's	SF	Sophomore	
1983–84^{†}	Steve Burtt Sr.	Iona	SG	Senior	
1983–84^{†}	Chris Mullin (2)	St. John's	SF	Junior	
1984–85	Chris Mullin* (3)	St. John's	SF	Senior	
1985–86	Walter Berry*	St. John's	PF	Senior	
1986–87^{†}	Kevin Houston	Army	PG	Senior	
1986–87^{†}	Mark Jackson	St. John's	PG	Senior	
1987–88	Mark Bryant	Seton Hall	PF	Senior	
1988–89	John Morton	Seton Hall	PG	Senior	
1989–90	Boo Harvey	St. John's	PG	Senior	
1990–91	Malik Sealy	St. John's	SF	Junior	
1991–92	Malik Sealy (2)	St. John's	SF	Senior	
1992–93	Terry Dehere	Seton Hall	SG	Senior	
1993–94^{†}	Izett Buchanan	Marist	SG	Senior	
1993–94^{†}	Artūras Karnišovas	Seton Hall	SF	Senior	
1994–95	Joe Griffin	LIU	SF	Senior	
1995–96	Adrian Griffin	Seton Hall	SG / SF	Senior	
1996–97	Charles Jones	LIU	PG	Junior	
1997–98	Felipe López	St. John's	SG	Senior	
1998–99	Ron Artest	St. John's	SF	Sophomore	
1999–00	Speedy Claxton	Hofstra	PG	Senior	
2000–01	Norman Richardson	Hofstra	SG / SF	Senior	
2001–02	Marcus Hatten	St. John's	PG	Junior	
2002–03	Luis Flores	Manhattan	PG	Junior	
2003–04^{†}	Andre Barrett	Seton Hall	PG	Senior	
2003–04^{†}	Luis Flores (2)	Manhattan	PG	Senior	
2004–05	Keydren Clark	Saint Peter's	PG	Junior	
2005–06	Quincy Douby	Rutgers	SG	Junior	
2006–07	Jared Jordan	Marist	PG	Senior	
2007–08	Jason Thompson	Rider	C	Senior	
2008–09	Charles Jenkins	Hofstra	SG	Sophomore	
2009–10	Charles Jenkins (2)	Hofstra	SG	Junior	
2010–11	Charles Jenkins (3)	Hofstra	SG	Senior	
2011–12	Scott Machado	Iona	PG	Senior	
2012–13	Lamont Jones	Iona	PG	Senior	
2013–14	D'Angelo Harrison	St. John's	SG	Junior	
2014–15	Sir'Dominic Pointer	St. John's	SF	Senior	
2015–16	Isaiah Whitehead	Seton Hall	SG	Sophomore	
2016–17	Ángel Delgado	Seton Hall	C	Junior	
2017–18	Shamorie Ponds	St. John's	PG	Sophomore	
2018–19	Myles Powell	Seton Hall	SG	Junior	
2019–20	Myles Powell (2)	Seton Hall	SG	Senior	
2020–21	Sandro Mamukelashvili	Seton Hall	C	Senior	
2021–22	Ron Harper Jr.	Rutgers	SF	Senior	
2022–23	Aaron Estrada	Hofstra	PG	Senior	
2023–24	Tyler Thomas	Hofstra	SG	Graduate	
2024–25	RJ Luis Jr.	St. John's	SG	Junior	
2025–26	Zuby Ejiofor	St. John's	PF	Senior	

== Winners by school ==
School	Winners	Years
St. John's	29	1941, 1942, 1943, 1944, 1945, 1949, 1952, 1959, 1961, 1962, 1967, 1973, 1978, 1983, 1984^{†}, 1985, 1986, 1987^{†}, 1990, 1991, 1992, 1998, 1999, 2002, 2014, 2015, 2018, 2025, 2026
Seton Hall	15	1953, 1964, 1979, 1982, 1988, 1989, 1993, 1994^{†}, 1996, 2004^{†}, 2016, 2017, 2019, 2020, 2021
Hofstra	9	1956, 1977, 2000, 2001, 2009, 2010, 2011, 2023, 2024
LIU	7	1936, 1937, 1939, 1950, 1966, 1995, 1997
Iona	6	1965, 1980, 1981, 1984^{†}, 2012, 2013
NYU	6	1940, 1946, 1947, 1948, 1960, 1963
Columbia	5	1951, 1957, 1968, 1969, 1970
Fordham	5	1954, 1955, 1958, 1971, 1972^{†}
Manhattan	4	1972^{†}, 1974, 2003, 2004^{†}
Rutgers	4	1975, 1976, 2006, 2022
Marist	2	1994^{†}, 2007
Army	1	1987^{†}
CCNY	1	1938
Rider	1	2008
Saint Peter's	1	2005
