= 1992 Patriot League men's basketball tournament =

- Classification: Division I
- Season: 1991–92
- Teams: 8
- Site: Stabler Arena; Bethlehem, Pennsylvania
- Champions: Fordham (2nd title)
- Winning coach: Nick Macarchuk (2nd title)
- MVP: Fred Herzog (Fordham)

1991–92 Patriot League men's basketball standings
	Conf.				Overall
Team	W		L	PCT	W		L	PCT
Fordham †	11	–	3	.786	18	–	13	.581
Bucknell	11	–	3	.786	21	–	9	.700
Holy Cross	10	–	4	.714	18	–	11	.621
Lehigh	8	–	6	.571	14	–	15	.483
Colgate	7	–	7	.500	14	–	14	.500
Lafayette	6	–	8	.429	8	–	20	.286
Army	2	–	12	.143	4	–	24	.143
Navy	1	–	13	.071	6	–	22	.214
† 1992 Patriot League tournament winner

The 1992 Patriot League men's basketball tournament was played at Stabler Arena in Bethlehem, Pennsylvania after the conclusion of the 1991–92 regular season. Top seed Fordham defeated #3 seed Bucknell, 70–65 in the championship game, to win its second Patriot League Tournament title. The Rams earned an automatic bid to the 1992 NCAA tournament as #14 seed in the East region.

== Format ==
All eight league members participated in the tournament, with teams seeded according to regular season conference record. Play began with the quarterfinal round.

== Bracket ==
Quarterfinals; March 7
1	Fordham	77
8	Navy	59
4	Lehigh	86
5	Colgate	71
3	Holy Cross	87
6	Lafayette	71
2	Bucknell	74
7	Army	55

Semifinals; March 8
1	Fordham	96
4	Lehigh	84
3	Holy Cross	77
2	Bucknell	86

Championship game March 10
1	Fordham	70
2	Bucknell	65
