= Cardinal Hayes High School =

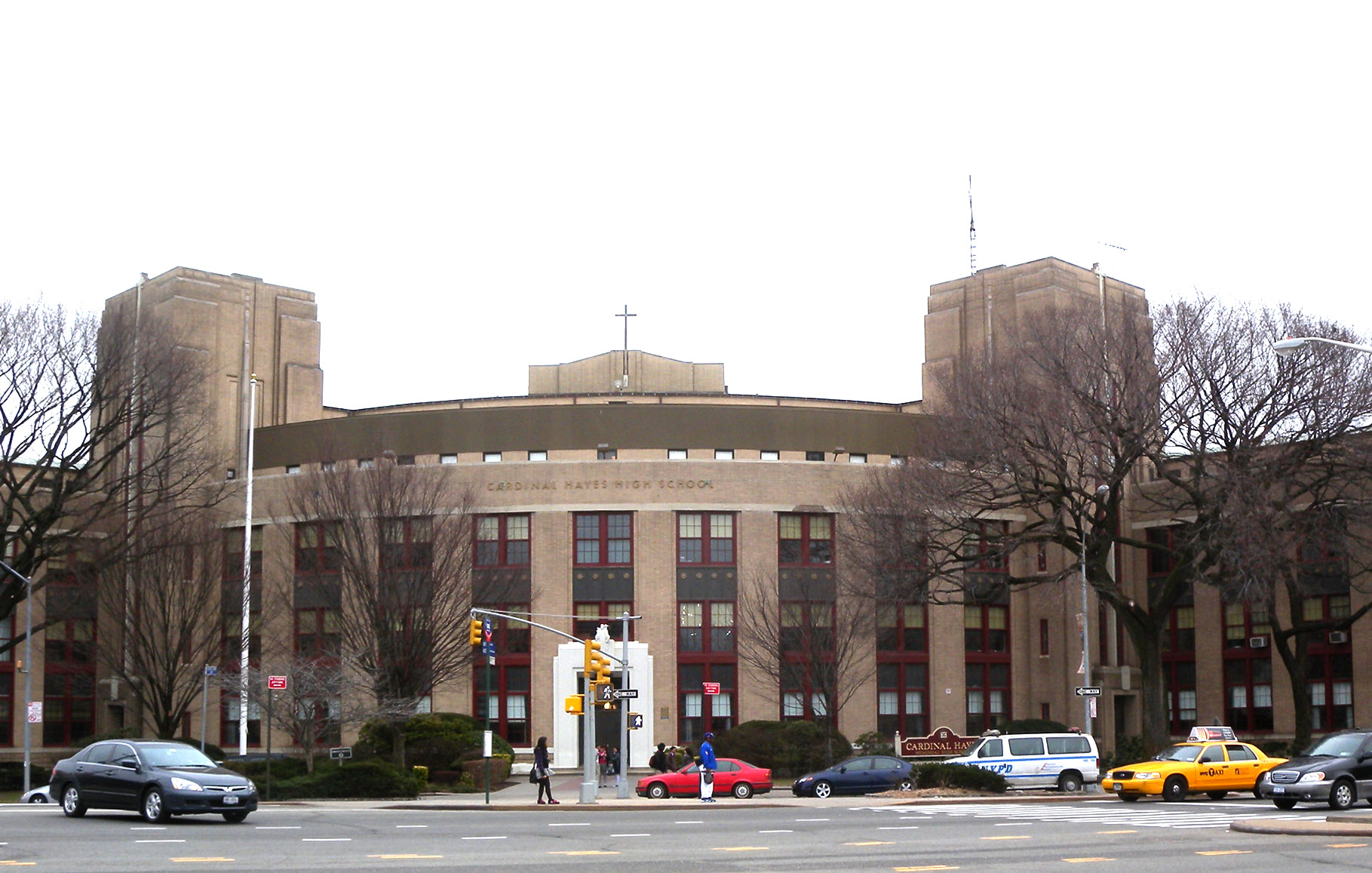

Location
- 650 Grand Concourse; Bronx, New York 10451; United States
- 40°49′14″N 73°55′31″W

Information
- Type: Private, catholic, college prep
- Motto: For God and Country
- Religious affiliation: Catholic
- Established: 1941 (85 years ago)
- Founder: Archbishop Francis Spellman
- Status: Open
- President: Michael Carey
- Principal: Steven M. Iuso
- Teaching staff: 43.0 (on an FTE basis)
- Grades: 9–12
- Gender: All-Male
- Enrollment: 600 (2025–2026)
- Student to teacher ratio: 15:1
- Campus type: Urban
- Colors: Cardinal and Gold
- Slogan: "Up Hayes and All Its Loyal Men"
- Athletics: Baseball, football, basketball, track and field, soccer, golf, bowling, cross country, lacrosse
- Athletics conference: Catholic High School Athletic Association (CHSAA)
- Mascot: Cardinal
- Nickname: Cardinals
- Team name: Cardinal Hayes Cardinals
- Rival: Mount Saint Michael Academy
- Accreditation: Middle States Association of Colleges and Schools
- Publication: City Scapes (literary magazine)
- Newspaper: Challenger (hayeschallenger.org)
- Yearbook: The Hayes
- Tuition: $8,800
- Website: www.cardinalhayes.org#/

Cardinal Hayes High School is a private, Catholic high school for boys located near the southern end of the Grand Concourse in the borough of the Bronx in New York City., New York. The school serves the Archdiocese of New York. It is a member of the Catholic High School Athletic Association. The building was constructed in the Art Deco style. It is named after Cardinal Patrick Joseph Hayes, a previous archbishop of the Archdiocese of New York.

== History ==
Cardinal Hayes was dedicated on September 8, 1941, by Archbishop Spellman. Cardinal Hayes' current rival is Mount Saint Michael Academy. The two schools' football teams have met annually since 1942 on Thanksgiving Day. Cardinal Hayes also takes part in non-annual football rivalries with Cardinal Spellman High School and Archbishop Stepinac High School for the Fathers' Club Trophy and the Father John Dubois Memorial Trophy, respectively. Throughout the years, the school has been staffed by Archdiocesan Priests, De La Salle, Xavieran, Marist and Irish Christian Brothers. The school today is largely staffed by lay faculty.

The present student body numbers and the school is currently staffed by Priests, Irish Christian Brothers, an Irish Franciscan Brother, students from several religious orders and a professional staff of 50 dedicated laymen and women. Over the years Hayes has been served by eleven principals: Bishop Furlong (1941-1945), Monsignor Edward Warisiar (1945-1952), Monsignor Henry Lenahan (1952-1954), Monsignor John Fleming (1954-1964), Monsignor Victor Davis (1964-1969), Monsignor Joseph Matthews (1969-1972), Monsignor Thomas McCormack (1972-1989), Monsignor John Graham, Brother Christopher Keogan (2003-2008), Mr. William D. Lessa (2008-2025), and currently Mr. Steven M. Iuso (2025-present)

== Notable alumni ==
- John Amirante, singer
- Edward Caban, New York City Police Commissioner
- George Carlin, stand-up comedian (did not graduate)
- Bob Chlupsa, Major League Baseball (MLB) player
- Stalin Colinet, National Football League (NFL) player, class of 1992
- Willie Colon, NFL champion
- Don DeLillo, author and playwright
- Cartier Diarra, professional basketball player
- Steve Dillon, MLB player
- George Dzundza, television and film actor
- Fatman Scoop, rapper and media personality
- James Feldeine (born 1988), American-Dominican basketball player in the Israeli Basketball Premier League
- John F. Good (1936–2016; class of 1954), FBI agent who created the Abscam sting operation
- Louis Gigante, Roman Catholic priest, South Bronx civic leader, NYC Councilman
- David Gonzalez, journalist for The New York Times
- Ian Jackson, D1 Basketball player
- Elijah Jones, college football cornerback for the Boston College Eagles
- Jim Jones, rapper from group Dipset (did not graduate)
- Paul LaRosa journalist, New York Daily News, CBS News-"48 Hours."
- Damon Lopez, professional basketball player
- Kevin Loughery, National Basketball Association (NBA) player, Detroit Pistons, Baltimore Bullets; player-coach Philadelphia 76ers
- Jamal Mashburn (class of 1990), NBA player, Dallas Mavericks, Miami Heat, and New Orleans Hornets
- Andrew C. McCarthy, columnist and former Assistant U.S. Attorney
- Bernard McGuirk, executive producer of Imus in the Morning radio and television program.
- Richard Mulligan, film, stage and television actor.
- Roscoe Orman, actor (attended briefly)
- George Pérez, illustrator and writer of comic books
- Regis Philbin, television personality
- Mario Runco, Jr., U.S. astronaut and former NASA mission specialist
- Bobby Sanabria, American (Latin jazz) drummer, percussionist, composer, arranger, educator
- Martin Scorsese, Oscar-winning filmmaker
- Lawrence A. Skantze (1928–2018; class of 1946), U.S. Air Force four-star general
- John Sweeney, President AFL–CIO 1995–2009; recipient of the 2010 Presidential Medal of Freedom
- Gerry Ward, basketball player; first-round pick in the 1963 NBA draft
