= Power Memorial Academy =

Location
- 161 West 61st Street; New York, New York 10023; USA; 40°46′17.53″N 73°59′9.33″W

Information
- Type: Private; Independent; college-preparatory; Catholic school
- Motto: Pro Christo Rege
- Religious affiliation: Catholic Church
- Established: September 1931; 95 years ago
- Status: closed
- Closed: June 1984; 42 years ago
- Oversight: Archdiocese of New York
- Grades: 9–12
- Gender: Boys
- Campus: urban
- Colors: Purple, gold, silver and red
- Athletics conference: Catholic High School Athletic Association (CHSAA)
- Mascot: Panther
- Nickname: Panthers
- Affiliation: Congregation of Christian Brothers
- Website: powermemorialacademyalumniassociation.com

Power Memorial Academy (PMA) was an all-boys Catholic high school located in the Manhattan borough of New York City that operated from 1931 to 1984. It was a basketball powerhouse, producing several NBA players including Kareem Abdul-Jabbar, Len Elmore, Mario Elie, Chris Mullin, as well as NBA referee Dick Bavetta and a record 71-game winning streak. Its 1964 basketball team was named "The #1 High School Team of The Century".

== History ==
=== Founding ===
In 1906, Monsignor James W. Power, pastor of All Saints Parish in Harlem, asked the Christian Brothers of Ireland, now the Congregation of Christian Brothers, to come to the United States and open a school to teach the boys of the largely Irish immigrant parish. The Brothers accepted the invitation and began to teach in the parochial school.

In 1909, they also opened the All Hallows Collegiate Institute, located in four rowhouses at 15 West 124th Street, which was both a high school and a business college. Enrollment grew and a new building was acquired to accommodate a larger student body at 164th Street and Walton Avenue in the Bronx, to which the high school moved in 1929.

At the request of the Archdiocese of New York, the Christian Brothers re-occupied the former site of All Hallows and opened a new school, named Power Memorial Academy after Monsignor Power, who had died in 1926. The new school opened with an enrollment of 31 freshmen on September 21, 1931.

Again the school grew, requiring more space. In 1938, the Brothers purchased the former New York Nursery & Child's Hospital at 161 West 61st Street and opened a new school there. The school remained at this address until it closed.

=== St. Patrick's Day murder ===
On March 15, 1948, Marko L. Markovich opened fire on students practicing for the St. Patrick's Day parade, killing one, Thomas Brady, and wounding six others. "Mad gunman kills boy here, wounds six before capture" read the front-page headline on The New York Times. In memoriam, the academy marched in the parade without music, their flags and drums wrapped in black. The parade was attended by President Harry S. Truman and Governor Thomas E. Dewey.

=== Closing ===
By the early 1980s, the school building was judged to have deteriorated to such an extent that the Brothers were unable to afford the necessary repairs. In June 1984, Power Memorial Academy closed. The property was sold the following year for $13 million. The building was demolished and a luxury apartment building was built on the site.

== Athletics ==
=== Basketball powerhouse ===
Power Memorial started a basketball program in the late 1930s, winning All-City championships in 1937 and 1941, and the Metropolitan Championship in 1942. Over its history, it won a total of eight New York City Catholic High School Athletic Association (CHSAA) championships.

In 1961, 6 ft 10 in (2.08 m) freshman Ferdinand Lewis Alcindor (later Kareem Abdul-Jabbar) joined the basketball team. Alcindor led the team to 27 consecutive victories and the 1963 CHSAA championship. The winning streak continued as the team went undefeated and won the CHSAA in 1964. The streak ended at 71 games on January 30, 1965 when DeMatha High School of Hyattsville, Maryland defeated Power, 46-43. That was one of only 6 losses in Alcindor's high school career (96–6). The 1963-64 team was named "The #1 High School Team of The Century" by National Sports Writers and was inducted into the CHSAA Hall of Fame as the team of the century.

Power Memorial continued to be known as a basketball powerhouse, although it never repeated the total dominance of the early 1960s. All-Americans Len Elmore, Ed Searcy and Jap Trimble were on the 1970 team that won the CHSAA and was named "Number 1 Team in the Country". Mario Elie played and Chris Mullin played at Power in the late 1970s, although Mullin later transferred to Xaverian High School.

The Power Memorial basketball teams were coached by:

- Jack Donohue – Varsity Head Coach 1959-1965 (went on to coach the Canadian National Basketball Team)
- Dick Percudani – Junior Varsity Coach & Assistant Varsity Coach 1959-1965
- Jack Kuhnert – Varsity Head Coach 1965-1970
- Brendan Malone – Junior Varsity Coach 1967-1969 & Varsity Coach 1970-1976
- Andre Anselme - Member of the CHSAA Coach Hall of Fame with Regis High School
- James Raysor – Led the Freshman team and won the City Championship
- Steve Donohue – Player and last Varsity Head Coach

=== Baseball ===
Three PMA players were drafted by major league teams:

- Julio Alonso, pitcher, Chicago White Sox, 1973
- James Buggy, pitcher, St. Louis Cardinals, 1974
- Larry McIver, outfielder, Pittsburgh Pirates, 1975

== Alumni association ==
In 1989, former faculty member Rich Coppolino organized a reunion, attended by 200. It has grown into a larger annual reunion. In 2002 a formal alumni association was created under the name Power Memorial Academy Alumni Association. Each year since 2002, the alumni association has made an annual appearance in the New York St. Patrick's Day parade. The association has won seven consecutive awards for its performance in the parade.

== Notable alumni ==
- Kareem Abdul-Jabbar (formally known as Ferdinand Lewis Alcindor), class of 1965, Naismith Basketball Hall of Fame inductee in 1995
- Dick Bavetta, class of 1958, professional basketball referee, inducted to the Naismith Basketball Hall of Fame in 2015.
- Matt Centrowitz, class of 1973, US Olympic runner, 1976 & 1980.
- Anthony Colón, class of 1970, Olympian (Puerto Rico) 1500 m 1972 and 1976.
- Mario Elie, class of 1981, professional basketball player and coach
- Joseph Crowley, class of 1980, Member of Congress
- Len Elmore, class of 1970, professional basketball player
- Johnny Ezersky, class of 1942, New York City High School Player of the Year as a Junior, professional basketball player
- Warren Isaac class of 1961, professional basketball player in Italy
- Steve James, class of 1970, 80's action and character actor. Supporting role in such films as the American Ninja series, Delta Force, and Johnny B. Good.
- Bruno Kirby, class of 1967, actor
- Brian Mullen, class of 1980, professional hockey player.
- Joe Mullen, class of 1975, NHL player and Hockey Hall of Fame inductee
- Chris Mullin, transferred before graduation, Naismith Basketball Hall of Fame inductee
- Danny Nee, former college basketball coach for Nebraska, Ohio, Duquesne, and the US Merchant Marine Academy.
- Peter Vallone, Sr., class of 1952, former Speaker of New York City Council
- Gerald Thomas Walsh, class of 1959, Auxiliary Bishop of NY
