= Damon Lopez =

American basketball player

Personal information
- Born: August 15, 1968 (age 58)
- Listed height: 6 ft 9 in (2.06 m)
- Listed weight: 240 lb (109 kg)

Career information
- High school: Cardinal Hayes (The Bronx, New York)
- College: Westchester CC (1987–1988); Fordham (1988–1991)
- NBA draft: 1991: undrafted
- Playing career: 1991–1999
- Position: Center

Career highlights
- Patriot League Player of the Year (1991); First-team All-Patriot League (1991); Second-team All-MAAC (1990); Patriot League tournament MVP (1991)

Damon Anthony Lopez (born August 15, 1968) is an American former basketball player known for his collegiate career at Fordham University between 1988 and 1991, where he was the Patriot League's first-ever player of the year in 1991. He also had a professional basketball career for eight years following college. Lopez played the center position and set a number of Fordham records for blocks. In 2015 he was selected to the Patriot League Men's Basketball 25th Anniversary Team.

== Playing career ==
A native of the Bronx, New York City, Lopez attended Cardinal Hayes High School. He stood 6'1" and was cut from the basketball team in both his junior and senior years. His uncle encouraged him to stick with it, and Lopez wound up attending Garden City Community College in Garden City, Kansas, where he redshirted his freshman season. Lopez then transferred to Westchester Community College back in New York and played one year there. Between a huge growth spurt that saw him reach 6'7" and him "catching up" to his new physique, Lopez dominated competition. At the national junior college tournament, scouts from many NCAA Division I programs attended to check out Lopez. He chose to play for Fordham University, which was located 20 blocks away from his childhood home and was also the first NCAA program to express interest in him. By the time he suited up for Fordham he stood 6'9" and weighed 240 pounds.

Lopez began his collegiate career with the Fordham Rams as a redshirt sophomore in 1988–89. That year he averaged 5.5 points, 5.8 rebounds, and 2.4 blocks per game. The following season, Lopez increased his averages to 11.4 points, 10.3 rebounds, and 2.8 blocks, while also grabbing 1.6 steals a game. The Rams finished in third place in the Metro Atlantic Athletic Conference (MAAC) North Division with a 10–6 conference record, and Lopez was named to the All-MAAC Second Team.

Fordham left the MAAC prior to the start of Lopez's senior year in 1990–91 to join the Patriot League, which had formed in 1986. He started 32 of 33 games (both career highs) and averaged 17.7 points, 9.5 rebounds, 3.0 blocks, and 2.0 steals per game. He tied his own school single-game blocks record of 10, set the single-season blocks record of 100, and set the career record of 252 blocks in just three seasons played (since surpassed by Bryant Dunston, who played four years). Fordham went 11–1 in Patriot League games, were crowned regular season champions, and went on to win the 1991 Patriot League tournament where Lopez was named the tournament MVP. He was named to the All-Patriot League First Team and won the Patriot League Player of the Year award, which was the first time it was awarded in league history. In 2008, Lopez was inducted into Fordham's Athletics Hall of Fame, and in 2015 he was honored on the Patriot League Men's Basketball 25th Anniversary Team.

Following college, Lopez went undrafted in the 1991 NBA draft. He had tryouts for the Portland Trail Blazers and Denver Nuggets but was never signed, so he instead played professionally in various international countries for the next eight years. He also had a stint playing in the United States Basketball League before retiring.
