= 1991–92 Fordham Rams men's basketball team =

American college basketball season

1991–92 Fordham Rams men's basketball

Patriot League Regular season champion Patriot League tournament champion

NCAA tournament
- Conference: Patriot League
- Record: 18–13 (11–3 Patriot)
- Head coach: Nick Macarchuk (5th season)
- Home arena: Rose Hill Gymnasium

1991–92 Patriot League men's basketball standings
	Conf.				Overall
Team	W		L	PCT	W		L	PCT
Fordham †	11	–	3	.786	18	–	13	.581
Bucknell	11	–	3	.786	21	–	9	.700
Holy Cross	10	–	4	.714	18	–	11	.621
Lehigh	8	–	6	.571	14	–	15	.483
Colgate	7	–	7	.500	14	–	14	.500
Lafayette	6	–	8	.429	8	–	20	.286
Army	2	–	12	.143	4	–	24	.143
Navy	1	–	13	.071	6	–	22	.214
† 1992 Patriot League tournament winner

The 1991–92 Fordham Rams men's basketball team represented Fordham University as a member of the Patriot League during the 1991–92 NCAA Division I men's basketball season. The team was coached by Nick Macarchuk, in his fifth year at the school, and played their home games at Rose Hill Gymnasium. The Rams had a record of 18–13 (11–3 Patriot League), finishing atop the conference regular season standings. They followed that success by winning the Patriot League tournament to receive an automatic bid to the NCAA tournament as No. 14 seed in the East region. Fordham lost in the opening round to UMass, 85–58.

== Roster ==
1991–92 Fordham Rams men's basketball team
Players	Coaches
Pos. / # / Name / Height / Weight / Year / Hometown; F / 23 / Fred Herzog / 6 ft 9 in (2.06 m) / — / Sr	Head coach: Nick Macarchuk (Connecticut); Assistant coach(es) Legend: (C) Team captain; (S) Suspended; (I) Ineligible; (W) Walk-on; Injured; Current redshirt

== Schedule ==
Date time, TV	Rank^{#}	Opponent^{#}	Result	Record	Site city, state
Regular season
Dec 27, 1991*		at No. 18 St. John's	L 53–70	2–5	Madison Square Garden; New York, New York
Dec 31, 1991*		at Southwest Missouri State	L 48–61	3–6	Hammons Student Center; Springfield, Missouri
Feb 26, 1992*		at Xavier	L 78–80	14–12	Cincinnati Gardens; Cincinnati, Ohio
Patriot League tournament
Mar 7, 1992*		vs. Navy; Quarterfinals	W 77–59	16–12	Stabler Arena; Bethlehem, Pennsylvania
Mar 8, 1992*		at Lehigh; Semifinals	W 98–84	17–12	Stabler Arena; Bethlehem, Pennsylvania
Mar 10, 1992*		vs. Bucknell; Championship Game	W 70–65	18–12	Stabler Arena; Bethlehem, Pennsylvania
NCAA tournament
Mar 20, 1992*	(14 E)	vs. (3 E) No. 17 UMass; First Round	L 58–85	18–13	Centrum in Worcester; Worcester, Massachusetts
*Non-conference game. ^{#}Rankings from AP Poll. (#) Tournament seedings in parentheses.
