= 1991 Patriot League men's basketball tournament =

- Classification: Division I
- Season: 1990–91
- Teams: 7
- Site: Hart Center; Worcester, Massachusetts
- Champions: Fordham (1st title)
- Winning coach: Nick Macarchuk (1st title)
- MVP: Damon Lopez (Fordham)

1990–91 Patriot League men's basketball standings
	Conf.				Overall
Team	W		L	PCT	W		L	PCT
Fordham †	11	–	1	.917	25	–	8	.758
Lehigh	10	–	2	.833	19	–	10	.655
Holy Cross	8	–	4	.667	18	–	12	.600
Bucknell	7	–	5	.583	18	–	13	.581
Army	3	–	9	.250	6	–	22	.214
Colgate	2	–	10	.167	5	–	23	.179
Lafayette	1	–	11	.083	7	–	21	.250
† 1991 Patriot League tournament winner

The 1991 Patriot League men's basketball tournament was played at Hart Center in Worcester, Massachusetts after the conclusion of the 1990–1991 regular season. Top seed Fordham defeated #3 seed Holy Cross, 84–81 (OT) in the championship game, to win the first Patriot League Tournament. The Rams were then defeated by Saint Francis (PA) in one of three play-in games to the 1991 NCAA tournament.

== Format ==
All seven league members participated in the tournament, with teams seeded according to regular season conference record. Regular-season champion Fordham received a bye to the semifinal round, with the other six teams playing a quarterfinal round.

== Bracket ==
Quarterfinals; February 28
4	Bucknell	67
5	Army	49
3	Holy Cross	92
6	Colgate	74
2	Lehigh	69
7	Lafayette	65

Semifinals; March 1
1	Fordham	82
4	Bucknell	76
3	Holy Cross	95**
2	Lehigh	90

Championship game March 2
1	Fordham	84*
3	Holy Cross	81

* denotes overtime period
