= Jim White (basketball) =

American basketball player

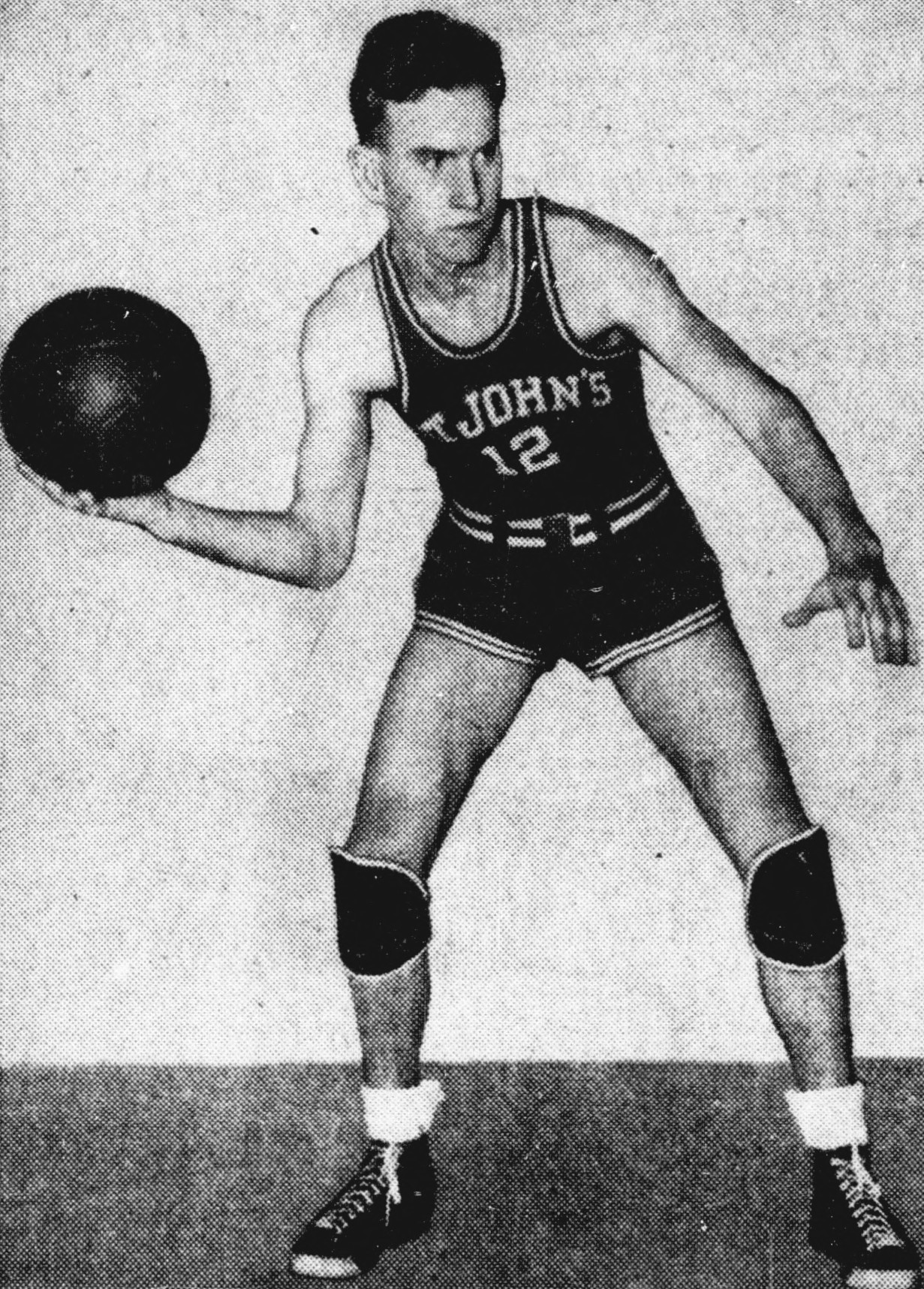
- White, circa 1941

Personal information
- Born: c. 1920
- Died: June 18, 1990 (aged 69) Wilton, Connecticut, U.S.
- Listed height: 6 ft 0 in (1.83 m)

Career information
- High school: Alexander Hamilton (Elmsford, New York)
- College: St. John's (1939–1942)
- Position: Guard

Career history
- 1946–1947: Elizabeth Braves

Career highlights
- Haggerty Award (1942)

James White (c. 1920 – June 18, 1990) was an American basketball player who is best known for winning the Haggerty Award while in college. He played for St. John's for three seasons (between 1939–40 and 1941–42) and was a proficient scorer in an era when games were much lower scoring than they are today. During his sophomore year in 1939–40, White averaged 8.7 points per game in leading the Redmen to a 15–5 overall record and a berth in the 1940 National Invitation Tournament. They lost in the quarterfinals (which was also the first round back then) to Duquesne.

As a junior, White averaged 10.2 points per game. Then, as a senior in 1941–42, he averaged 9.5 per game. That year he received the Haggerty Award, which is an annual award given since 1935–36 to the best male collegiate basketball player in the New York City metropolitan area.

He played one season of professional basketball with the Elizabeth Braves in the American Basketball League. He eventually became a businessman and served as vice-president and treasurer of NBC Television. He died from congestive heart failure on June 18, 1990 in Wilton, Connecticut. In 1992, he was inducted into St. John's University Athletic Hall of Fame.
