= Warren Isaac =

American basketball player (born 1943)

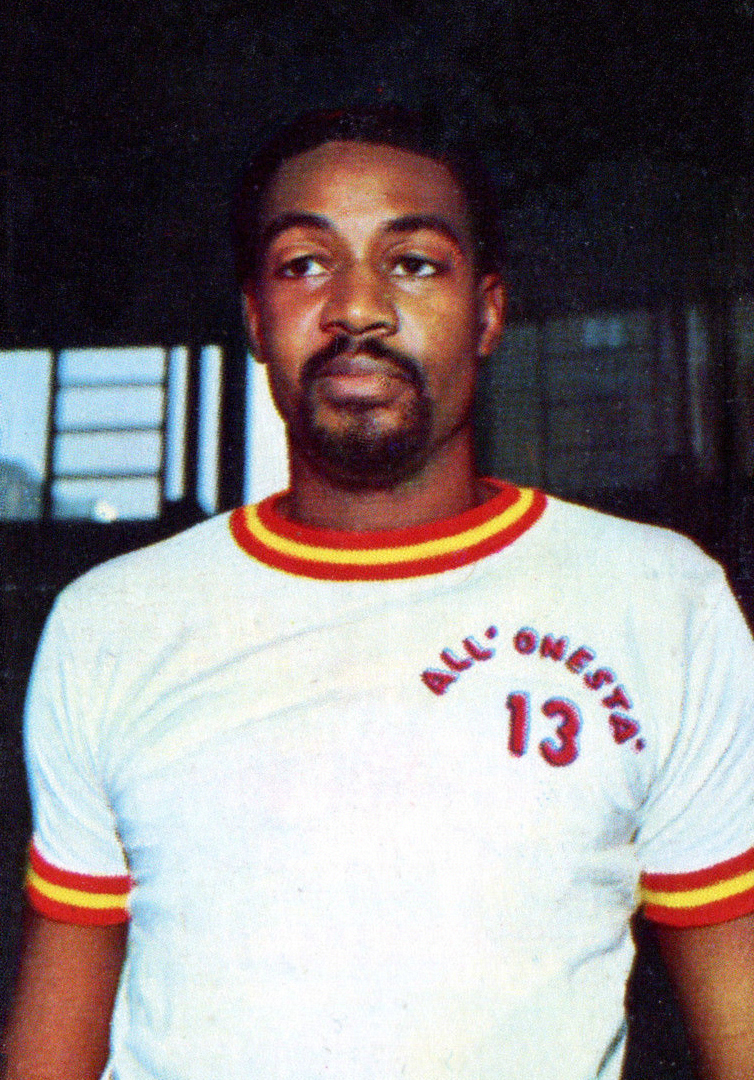
- Isaac with Milano (1969–70 season)

Personal information
- Born: August 8, 1943 (age 83) New York City, New York
- Listed height: 6 ft 8 in (2.03 m)
- Listed weight: 200 lb (91 kg)

Career information
- High school: Power Memorial (New York City, New York)
- College: Iona (1962–1965)
- NBA draft: 1965: 5th round, 42nd overall pick
- Drafted by: Cincinnati Royals
- Playing career: 1965–1971
- Position: Power forward / center
- Number: 13
- Coaching career: 1986–1993

Career history

Playing
- 1965–1971: All'Onestà Milano

Coaching
- 1986–1989: DiVarese Varese
- 1989–1991: Pallacanestro Reggio Emilia
- 1991–1992: Depi Napoli
- 1992–1993: Cagiva Varese

Career highlights
- Haggerty Award (1965)
- Stats at Basketball Reference

Joseph Warren Isaac (born August 8, 1943), commonly known as Warren Isaac in the United States and Joe Isaac in Italy, is an American basketball coach and former professional player. He had a standout college career at Iona before playing and coaching professionally in Italy.

== High school career ==
From 1957 to 1961, Isaac attended Power Memorial Academy, the high school where Lew Alcindor (later Kareem Abdul-Jabbar) played a couple of years later. He wouldn't be on the same team as 1965 graduate Alcindor, but he did share a court with him when they attended Power Memorial coach Jack Donohue's training camps.

== College career ==
He joined Iona College of the NCAA University Division after graduation. In each of his three seasons with the Gaels, (Note: Freshmen were ineligible until 1972) he led the team in scoring and rebounding with 343 (18.1 per game), 439 (22) 549 (23.9) points and 241 (12.7) 403 (20.2), 480 (20.9) rebounds respectively. The latter two seasons were respectively first and third Iona all-time best for total rebounds and first and second for rebounding average, whilst his senior season – that saw him ranked thirteenth and second best nationally in points and rebounds (only 0.1 rebounds behind Toby Kimball) – was third best by scoring average. Isaac broke Richie Guerin's record when he scored 50 points during a December 18, 1964 game against Bates, broken down into 21 field goals (also a new record) and 8 free throws, to which he added 27 rebounds. That record performance (still current record for Iona single game highs in points and field goals) is one of nine 30+ points efforts by Isaac, including one against Duquesne on January 7, 1965, that saw him score one basket from at least 35-feet with five seconds left to win the game for Iona, as he passed the 1,000 career points mark.

He finished his collegiate career on March 7, 1965, after a game against Rider in which he posted 16 points to finish with 1,331 careers points, 44 points short of Guerin's record, having added 50 points and 74 rebounds in his last three games. His 1,124 rebounds however, did break a school record as did his career average of 18.1 per game (both still-standing), whilst his career scoring average of 21.5 points per game is also a historic best, accrued with a .512 career field goal percentage.

As a senior, he won the Haggerty Award (for the best college basketball player from the New York Metropolitan Area) by the Metropolitan Basketball Writers Association, along with a selection to the All-East major college team by the ECAC and the District Two All-America by Look magazine.

Isaac was inducted into the Iona Gaels Hall of Fame in 1985.

== Professional career ==
Seen as a bit lean for the professional game, Isaac was selected in the fifth round of the 1965 NBA draft by the Cincinnati Royals. He participated in the Royals' training camp, but they allegedly only offered him to play in a minor league (likely the Eastern Basketball Association). With space in the then nine team NBA hard to find, he went abroad.

The American went to Milan, where he was reportedly trialed by Olimpia Milano who were said to be interested in his rebounding abilities but put off by the fact he wasn't a true center. He stayed in the city though, signing his first professional contract with rivals All'Onestà Milano. Isaac, known as Joe in Italy, would play for six years in the Serie A with the "other Milano", becoming a major player for the side (he was the first foreigner to be named the captain of an Italian team in 1969) as they twice finished third in the league.

Returning to the United States in 1971, he signed with the New York Nets of the ABA but was waived on October 15, 1971, before the season started.

== Coaching career ==
Isaac had earlier in the month returned to Iona to take a coaching role, later serving as assistant coach to Gene Roberti until at least July 1974.

After a stint in Venezuela, Isaac was brought back to Italy in 1982 by former Milano teammate Antonio Bulgheroni, then president of Pallacanestro Varese, to take charge of the youth side. Bulgheroni named him first team coach prior to the 1986–87 season and Isaac returned to the Serie A, though he at first did not have a coaching license. He coached the side for three seasons, twice winning the regular season and reaching the 1988 Italian Cup final but never claiming a title. He then coached Pallacanestro Reggio Emilia, Depi Napoli and Varese again (in 1992–93), before going back to the United States in 1994 to take care of his businesses there.

Isaac came back to Italy in 1999, again called by Bulgheroni who nominated him head of the athletics department at the University Carlo Cattaneo, whose basketball team he would lead to the Serie C2 in 2004. He later joined lower-league side Pallacanestro Laveno as youth team coach, a position he holds as of August 2015.
