= Nick Macarchuk =

American basketball player and coach

Current position
- Title: Head coach

Biographical details
- Born: June 26, 1941 (age 85); Norwich, Connecticut, U.S.

Playing career
- 1960–1963: Fairfield

Coaching career (HC unless noted)
- 1963–1972: St. Thomas More HS (CT)
- 1972–1977: Providence (assistant)
- 1977–1987: Canisius
- 1987–1999: Fordham
- 1999–2005: Stony Brook

Accomplishments and honors

Championships
- America East regular season (1985); 2x Patriot League regular season (1991, 1992); 2x Patriot League tournament (1991, 1992)

Awards
- America East Coach of the Year (1984); Patriot League Coach of the Year (1991); Atlantic 10 Coach of the Year (1999)

Nick Macarchuk (born June 26, 1941) is a former men's college basketball head coach. He was the head coach at Canisius, Fordham, and Stony Brook.

Macarchuk earned A-10 coach of the year in 1999 when he coached the Fordham to a 12–16 (5–11) record after going 16–65 in the prior 3 seasons as the team tried to adjust to scholarship athlete competition in the A-10 after moving from the non-scholarship Patriot League.

== Head coaching record ==
Record table
Season	Team	Overall	Conference	Standing	Postseason
Canisius Golden Griffins (Independent) (1977–1979)
1977–78	Canisius	7–19			
1978–79	Canisius	12–14			
Canisius:		19–33 (.365)	0–0 (–)		
Canisius Golden Griffins (ECAC North) (1979–1987)
1979–80	Canisius	13–14		6th	
1980–81	Canisius	11–15		T–6th	
1981–82	Canisius	19–8	7–2	T–2nd	
1982–83	Canisius	11–17	3–6	7th	
1983–84	Canisius	19–11	9–5	2nd	
1984–85	Canisius	20–10	13–3	1st	NIT First round
1985–86	Canisius	21–8	14–4	2nd	
1986–87	Canisius	16–12	12–6	4th	
Canisius:		130–95 (.578)	82–55 (.599)		
Fordham Rams (MAAC) (1987–1990)
1987–88	Fordham	18–15	9–5	3rd	NIT First round
1988–89	Fordham	14–15	8–6	4th	
1989–90	Fordham	20–13	10–6	4th	NIT Second round
Fordham:		52–43 (.547)	27–17 (.614)		
Fordham Rams (Patriot League) (1990–1995)
1990–91	Fordham	25–8	13–3	1st	NIT Second round
1991–92	Fordham	18–13	11–3	1st	NCAA first round
1992–93	Fordham	15–16	9–5	3rd	
1993–94	Fordham	12–15	9–5	2nd	
1994–95	Fordham	11–17	6–8	5th	
Fordham:		81–69 (.540)	48–24 (.667)		
Fordham Rams (Atlantic 10 Conference) (1995–1999)
1995–96	Fordham	4–23	2–14	12th	
1996–97	Fordham	6–21	1–15	12th	
1997–98	Fordham	6–21	2–14	12th	
1998–99	Fordham	12–15	5–11	9th	
Fordham:		28–80 (.259)	10–54 (.156)		
Stony Brook Seawolves (Independent) (1999–2001)
1999–00	Stony Brook	6–23			
2000–01	Stony Brook	17–11			
Stony Brook:		23–34 (.404)	0–0 (–)		
Stony Brook Seawolves (America East Conference) (2001–2005)
2001–02	Stony Brook	6–22	5–11	9th	
2002–03	Stony Brook	13–15	7–9	7th	
2003–04	Stony Brook	10–20	5–13	8th	
2004–05	Stony Brook	12–17	6–12	7th	
Stony Brook:		41–74 (.357)	23–45 (.338)		
Total:		374–428 (.466)			
National champion Postseason invitational champion Conference regular season champion Conference regular season and conference tournament champion Division regular season champion Division regular season and conference tournament champion Conference tournament champion
