= Joseph Chartouny =

Canadian-Lebanese basketball player

Personal information
- Born: December 3, 1994 (age 31) Montreal, Quebec, Canada
- Listed height: 6 ft 3 in (1.91 m)
- Listed weight: 200 lb (91 kg)

Career information
- High school: Jean-de-Brébeuf (Montreal, Quebec)
- College: Fordham (2015–2018); Marquette (2018–2019)
- NBA draft: 2019: undrafted
- Playing career: 2019–present
- Position: Point guard

Career history
- 2019–2020: Sagesse
- 2021: Union Rennes basket 35
- 2021: Champville SC

Career highlights
- NCAA steals leader (2018); Atlantic 10 Rookie of the Year (2016); Atlantic 10 All-Defensive Team (2018); Atlantic 10 All-Rookie Team (2016)

Joseph Pierre Abi-Zakhour El Chartouny (born December 3, 1994) is a Canadian-Lebanese former professional basketball player. He played college basketball for Fordham and Marquette.

== Early life ==
Chartouny was born and raised in Montreal, Quebec. He grew up playing basketball and soccer and was a fan of the San Antonio Spurs. Chartouny played basketball for Collège Jean-de-Brébeuf in Montreal. He led his team to six provincial titles, averaging 20 points, five rebounds and five assists per game in his final season. Chartouny played for Brookwood Elite on the Amateur Athletic Union circuit. He was considered the fourth-best Canadian prospect in his class by North Pole Hoops. Chartouny committed to play college basketball for Fordham over offers from Princeton, Vermont, American and Green Bay, among others.

== College career ==
As a freshman at Fordham, Chartouny averaged 11.3 points, 5.3 rebounds, 6.2 assists and an Atlantic 10-high 2.2 steals per game. He led all NCAA Division I freshman in assists per game, and his 161 assists broke the school freshman record. Chartouny was named Atlantic 10 Rookie of the Year. He averaged 12.1 points, 4.1 rebounds, five assists and 3.2 steals per game as a sophomore. Chartouny led the Atlantic 10 and set a single-season school record in steals, while ranking third in the nation in steals per game. After the season, he declared for the 2017 NBA draft without hiring an agent, before returning to Fordham. On February 17, 2018, Chartouny scored a career-high 28 points and grabbed 10 rebounds in an 80-70 loss to Dayton. As a junior, Chartouny averaged 12.2 points, 5.6 rebounds, 4.6 assists and a nation-leading 3.3 steals per game. For his senior season, he transferred to Marquette. He averaged three points, 2.3 rebounds and 1.9 assists per game, helping the team finish second in the Big East.

== Professional career ==
On September 19, 2019, Chartouny signed his first professional contract with Sagesse of the Lebanese Basketball League. In 2021, according to Chartouny's LinkedIn page, he played for Union Rennes basket 35 and Champville SC.

In March 2022, Joseph Chartouny received his real estate broker’s license from the Organisme d’autoréglementation du courtage immobilier du Québec (OACIQ) and began serving clients in the Laval area.

== National team career ==
Chartouny represented Lebanon at the 2017 FIBA Asia Cup, averaging 2.6 points per game. In the same year, he played at the FIBA World Cup qualification stage. In February 2020, Chartouny joined Lebanon for the FIBA Asia Cup qualification stage.

== Career statistics ==
Legend
GP	Games played	GS	Games started	MPG	Minutes per game
FG%	Field goal percentage	3P%	3-point field goal percentage	FT%	Free throw percentage
RPG	Rebounds per game	APG	Assists per game	SPG	Steals per game
BPG	Blocks per game	PPG	Points per game	**Bold**	Career high
*	Led the league

=== College ===
Year	Team	GP	GS	MPG	FG%	3P%	FT%	RPG	APG	SPG	BPG	PPG
2015–16	Fordham	26	26	32.8	.370	.315	.765	5.4	6.2	2.2	0.2	11.3
2016–17	Fordham	29	26	33.1	.415	.382	.759	4.1	5.0	3.2	0.1	12.1
2017–18	Fordham	29	28	36.0	.371	.284	.697	5.6	4.6	3.3	0.3	12.2
2018–19	Marquette	34	0	15.0	.450	.381	.625	2.3	1.9	0.7	0.0	3.0
Career		118	80	28.5	.392	.333	.730	4.2	4.3	2.3	0.2	9.3

== Personal life ==
Chartouny is the son of Lebanese parents. In 1990, at the end of the Lebanese Civil War, his family moved to Montreal. He is fluent in Arabic, English and French.
