= Jim Cunningham (basketball) =

American basketball player (1935–1991)

Personal information
- Born: November 14, 1935 Buffalo, New York, US
- Died: December 17, 1991 (aged 56)
- Listed height: 6 ft 3 in (1.91 m)
- Listed weight: 190 lb (86 kg)

Career information
- High school: Canisius (Buffalo, New York)
- College: Fordham (1955–1958)
- NBA draft: 1958: 3rd round, 23rd overall pick
- Drafted by: Boston Celtics
- Position: Shooting guard

Career highlights
- Haggerty Award winner (1958); Fordham Hall of Fame (1976)
- Stats at Basketball Reference

James W. Cunningham (November 14, 1935 – December 17, 1991) was an American standout basketball player at Fordham University in the 1950s.

A native of Buffalo, New York, Cunningham enrolled at Fordham where he played for head coach Johnny Bach between 1955 and 1958 because college freshmen were ineligible to play varsity sports during this era. Standing 6 ft 3 in (1.91 m) and weighing 190 lb (86 kg), Cunningham played the shooting guard position. In just three varsity seasons he scored a then-school record 1,744 points. In his senior season of 1957–58, Cunningham led the Rams to a berth in the National Invitation Tournament, where they advanced to the quarterfinals before losing to Dayton. Upon the conclusion of the season he was named an All-American as well as the recipient of the Haggerty Award. The Haggerty Award is presented to the best male collegiate basketball player in the greater New York city area every year since 1935–36, and Cunningham was only Fordham's second-ever recipient. For his career at Fordham, he averaged 22.9 points and 6.7 rebounds per game in 76 games played.

The NBA's Boston Celtics selected Cunningham in the 1958 NBA draft. He was taken in the third round (23rd overall) but ultimately never played in the league.
