= 2015–16 Niagara Purple Eagles men's basketball team =

American college basketball season

2015–16 Niagara Purple Eagles men's basketball
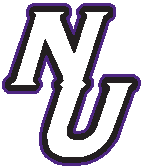
- Conference: Metro Atlantic Athletic Conference
- Record: 7–25 (5–15 MAAC)
- Head coach: Chris Casey (3rd season)
- Assistant coaches: Marc Rybczyk; Will Lanier; Kareem Brown
- Home arena: Gallagher Center

2015–16 MAAC men's basketball standings
	Conf.				Overall
Team	W		L	PCT	W		L	PCT
Monmouth	17	–	3	.850	28	–	8	.778
Iona †	16	–	4	.800	22	–	11	.667
Siena	13	–	7	.650	21	–	13	.618
Fairfield	12	–	8	.600	19	–	14	.576
Saint Peter's	12	–	8	.600	14	–	16	.467
Manhattan	9	–	11	.450	13	–	18	.419
Canisius	8	–	12	.400	14	–	19	.424
Rider	8	–	12	.400	13	–	20	.394
Quinnipiac	6	–	14	.300	9	–	21	.300
Niagara	5	–	15	.250	7	–	25	.219
Marist	4	–	16	.200	7	–	23	.233
† 2016 MAAC tournament winner

The 2015–16 Niagara Purple Eagles men's basketball team represented Niagara University during the 2015–16 NCAA Division I men's basketball season. The Purple Eagles, led by third year head coach Chris Casey, played their home games at the Gallagher Center and were members of the Metro Atlantic Athletic Conference. They finished the season 7–25, 5–15 in MAAC play to finish in tenth place. They lost in the first round of the MAAC tournament to Canisius.

== Roster ==
Number	Name	Position	Height	Weight	Year	Hometown
0	Chris Barton	Guard	6–3	180	Freshman	Pontiac, Michigan
1	Camerson Fowler	Guard	6–0	165	RS–Junior	Detroit, Michigan
2	Emile Blackman	Guard	6–4	195	RS–Junior	Dix Hills, New York
4	Romero Collier	Guard	6–1	190	Freshman	Syracuse, New York
5	Kevin Larkin	Guard	6–5	180	RS–Sophomore	Lincoln, Delaware
10	Kahlil Dukes	Guard	6–0	170	RS–Junior	Hartford, Connecticut
11	Marvin Prochet	Forward	6–7	195	Freshman	Brooklyn, New York
12	Karonn Davis	Guard	6–2	185	RS–Sophomore	Philadelphia, Pennsylvania
13	Matt Scott	Forward	6–4	170	Sophomore	Brooklyn, New York
20	Maurice Taylor, Jr.	Forward	6–6	205	Junior	Cambridge, Massachusetts
21	Justin Satchell	Forward	6–8	225	Junior	Miramar, Florida
24	David Varoli	Guard	6–0	175	Junior	Katonah, New York
30	Alioune Tew	Forward	6–9	215	RS–Sophomore	Paris, France
31	Thomas Fleming	Guard	6–4	195	RS–Junior	Dobbs Ferry, New York
32	Dominic Robb	Forward	6–8	215	Freshman	Pittsburgh, Pennsylvania

== Schedule ==
Date time, TV	Opponent	Result	Record	Site (attendance) city, state
Regular season
11/13/2015*; 7:00 pm	at Old Dominion; Hall of Fame Tip Off	L 50–67	0–1	Ted Constant Convocation Center (8,150); Norfolk, VA
11/15/2015*; 5:00 pm	at Saint Joseph's; Hall of Fame Tip Off	L 62–73	0–2	Hagan Arena (3,486); Philadelphia
11/18/2015*; 7:00 pm, LCTV 21	Brown	W 75–66	1–2	Gallagher Center (1,335); Lewiston, NY
11/21/2015*; 2:00 pm, ESPN3	vs. Vermont; Hall of Fame Tip Off	L 67–85	1–3	Mohegan Sun Arena (4,507); Uncasville, CT
11/22/2015*; 7:00 pm	vs. North Carolina A&T; Hall of Fame Tip Off	W 73–72	2–3	Mohegan Sun Arena (3,813); Uncasville, CT
11/24/2015*; 7:00 pm	at Hartford	L 73–77	2–4	Chase Arena at Reich Family Pavilion (772); Hartford, CT
11/28/2015*; 3:00 pm	Youngstown State	L 70–88	2–5	Gallagher Center (883); Lewiston, NY
12/04/2015; 7:00 pm	Quinnipiac	W 76–72	3–5 (1–0)	Gallagher Center (1,204); Lewiston, NY
12/06/2015; 2:00 pm, TWCSC	Monmouth	L 42–56	3–6 (1–1)	Gallagher Center (1,147); Lewiston, NY
12/09/2015*; 5:00 pm, FS1	at St. John's	L 44–48	3–7	Carnesecca Arena (5,602); Queens, NY
12/12/2015*; 3:00 pm, LCTV 21	LIU Brooklyn	L 79–80 ^{OT}	3–8	Gallagher Center (1,077); Lewiston, NY
12/23/2015*; 7:00 pm	at Albany	L 56–65	3–9	SEFCU Arena (3,182); Albany, NY
12/30/2015*; 7:00 pm, TWCSC	at St. Bonaventure	L 68–82	3–10	Reilly Center (3,728); Olean, NY
01/02/2016; 7:00 pm, TWCSC	at Siena	L 63–75	3–11 (1–2)	Times Union Center (6,483); Albany, NY
01/04/2016; 7:00 pm, ESPN3	at Iona	L 52–65	3–12 (1–3)	Hynes Athletic Center (1,081); New Rochelle, NY
01/07/2016; 7:00 pm, TWCSC	Saint Peter's	W 63–61	4–12 (2–3)	Gallagher Center (851); Lewiston, NY
01/09/2016; 3:00 pm, TWCSC	Manhattan	W 55–53	5–12 (3–3)	Gallagher Center (1,021); Lewiston, NY
01/15/2016; 7:00 pm	at Fairfield	L 68–73	5–13 (3–4)	Webster Bank Arena (1,014); Bridgeport, CT
01/17/2016; 2:00 pm	at Manhattan	L 64–69	5–14 (3–5)	Draddy Gymnasium (1,492); Riverdale, NY
01/22/2016; 7:00 pm, ESPNU	Canisius; Battle of the Bridge	L 61–70	5–15 (3–6)	Gallagher Center (2,110); Lewiston, NY
01/26/2016; 7:00 pm, TWCSC	Siena	L 70–82	5–16 (3–7)	Gallagher Center (1,098); Lewiston, NY
01/28/2016; 7:30 pm, ESPN3	at Marist	W 69–66	6–16 (4–7)	McCann Field House (1,017); Poughkeepsie, NY
01/30/2016; 2:00 pm	at Quinnipiac	L 68–82	6–17 (4–8)	TD Bank Sports Center (1,451); Hamden, CT
02/05/2016; 7:00 pm	Rider	L 60–66	6–18 (4–9)	Gallagher Center (1,257); Lewiston, NY
02/07/2016; 2:00 pm, TWCSC	Iona	L 61–75	6–19 (4–10)	Gallagher Center (1,154); Lewiston, NY
02/12/2016; 9:00 pm, ESPNU/ESPN3	at Saint Peter's	L 59–72	6–20 (4–11)	Yanitelli Center (346); Jersey City, NY
02/14/2016; 2:00 pm	at Rider	L 59–77	6–21 (4–12)	Alumni Gymnasium (1,414); Lawrenceville, NJ
02/18/2016; 7:00 pm, TWCSC	Marist	W 76–72	7–21 (5–12)	Gallagher Center (1,163); Lewiston, NY
02/20/2016; 3:00 pm	Fairfield	L 59–71	7–22 (5–13)	Gallagher Center (1,270); Lewiston, NY
02/25/2016; 7:00 pm, ESPN3	at Canisius; Battle of the Bridge	L 60–65	7–23 (5–14)	Koessler Athletic Center (2,023); Buffalo, NY
02/28/2016; 5:00 pm, ESPN3	at Monmouth	L 68–77	7–24 (5–15)	Multipurpose Activity Center (4,172); West Long Branch, NJ
MAAC tournament
03/03/2016; 7:00 pm	vs. Canisius; First round	L 97–102 ^{3OT}	7–25	Times Union Center (2,628); Albany, NY
*Non-conference game. ^{#}Rankings from AP Poll. (#) Tournament seedings in parentheses. All times are in Eastern Time.
