= 2015–16 Siena Saints men's basketball team =

American college basketball season

2015–16 Siena Saints men's basketball

CBI, First round
- Conference: Metro Atlantic Athletic Conference
- Record: 21–13 (13–7 MAAC)
- Head coach: Jimmy Patsos (3rd season)
- Assistant coaches: Greg Manning; Jordan Watson; Lucious Jordan
- Home arena: Times Union Center; Alumni Recreation Center

2015–16 MAAC men's basketball standings
	Conf.				Overall
Team	W		L	PCT	W		L	PCT
Monmouth	17	–	3	.850	28	–	8	.778
Iona †	16	–	4	.800	22	–	11	.667
Siena	13	–	7	.650	21	–	13	.618
Fairfield	12	–	8	.600	19	–	14	.576
Saint Peter's	12	–	8	.600	14	–	16	.467
Manhattan	9	–	11	.450	13	–	18	.419
Canisius	8	–	12	.400	14	–	19	.424
Rider	8	–	12	.400	13	–	20	.394
Quinnipiac	6	–	14	.300	9	–	21	.300
Niagara	5	–	15	.250	7	–	25	.219
Marist	4	–	16	.200	7	–	23	.233
† 2016 MAAC tournament winner

The 2015–16 Siena Saints men's basketball team represented Siena College during the 2015–16 NCAA Division I men's basketball season. The Saints, led by third year head coach Jimmy Patsos, played their home games at the Times Union Center, with one exhibition game at Alumni Recreation Center, and were members of the Metro Atlantic Athletic Conference. They finished the season 21–13, 13–7 in MAAC play to finish in third place. They defeated Manhattan in the quarterfinals of the MAAC tournament to advance to semifinals where they lost to Iona. They were invited to the College Basketball Invitational where they lost in the first round to Morehead State.

== Roster ==
2015–16 Siena Saints men's basketball team
Players
Coaches

Pos.	#	Name	Height	Weight	Year	Previous school	Hometown
F	0	Javion Ogunyemi	6 ft 8 in (2.03 m)	239 lb (108 kg)	Jr	Troy	Troy, New York
G	1	Marquis Wright	6 ft 0 in (1.83 m)	160 lb (73 kg)	Jr	North Point	Waldorf, Maryland
F	2	Willem Brandwijk	6 ft 8 in (2.03 m)	229 lb (104 kg)	So	Holderness School	Voorburg, Netherlands
G	3	Ryan Oliver	6 ft 5 in (1.96 m)	200 lb (91 kg)	Sr	Northfield Mount Hermon (MA)	Inglewood, California
G	5	Kenny Wormley	6 ft 4 in (1.93 m)	179 lb (81 kg)	Fr	Riverdale Baptist	Upper Marlboro, Maryland
G	11	Cameron Gottfried	6 ft 3 in (1.91 m)	175 lb (79 kg)	So	Broughton	Raleigh, North Carolina
G	14	Kadeem Smithen	6 ft 2 in (1.88 m)	162 lb (73 kg)	So	Thornlea Secondary School; Richmond	Ajax, Ontario, Canada
F	20	Jimmy Merrill	6 ft 10 in (2.08 m)	215 lb (98 kg)	Jr	Columbia HS	Rensselaer, New York
G	21	Jimmy Paige	6 ft 4 in (1.93 m)	211 lb (96 kg)	So	Cape Henry Collegiate	Bridgeport, Ohio
G/F	24	Lavon Long	6 ft 7 in (2.01 m)	222 lb (101 kg)	So	Oakland Mills	Baltimore, Maryland
G/F	30	Kinnon LaRose	6 ft 4 in (1.93 m)	181 lb (82 kg)	Fr	Ogdensburg Free Academy	Ogdensburg, New York
F	31	Brett Bisping	6 ft 8 in (2.03 m)	238 lb (108 kg)	Jr	Morton	Peoria, Illinois
G	32	Evan Fisher	6 ft 8 in (2.03 m)	249 lb (113 kg)	Fr	McDonogh School	Pasadena, Maryland
C	34	Imoh Silas	6 ft 9 in (2.06 m)	229 lb (104 kg)	Sr	Holderness School	Lagos, Nigeria

Head coach

- Jimmy Patsos, 3rd yr. (Catholic, 1989)

Assistant coach(es)

- Greg Manning, 3rd yr. (Loyola (MD), 2008)
- Jordan Watson, 1st. (Augustana (IL), 2005)
- Lucious Jordan, 3rd yr. (Albany, 2006)

Legend

- (C) Team captain
- (S) Suspended
- (I) Ineligible
- (W) Walk-on
- Injured
- Current redshirt

Roster
Last update: October 19, 2015

== Schedule ==
Date time, TV	Opponent	Result	Record	Site (attendance) city, state
Exhibition
11/02/2015*; 7:00 pm	Indiana (PA)	W 82–73		Alumni Recreation Center (1,015); Loudonville, NY
Regular season
11/13/2015*; 7:00 pm, ESPNU	at No. 5 Duke; 2K Sports Classic	L 74–92	0–1	Cameron Indoor Stadium (9,314); Durham, NC
11/15/2015*; 8:00 pm, ESPNU	at No. 17 Wisconsin; 2K Sports Classic	L 65–92	0–2	Kohl Center (17,287); Madison, WI
11/20/2015*; 4:00 pm	vs. Radford; 2K Sports Classic	W 76–62	1–2	Chace Athletic Center (278); Smithfield, RI
11/21/2015*; 7:00 pm	at Byrant; 2K Sports Classic	W 78–59	2–2	Chace Athletic Center (568); Smithfield, RI
11/24/2015*; 7:00 pm	at Bucknell	W 83–81 ^{OT}	3–2	Sojka Pavilion (2,295); Lewisburg, PA
11/28/2015*; 12:00 pm	Loyola (MD)	W 90–82 ^{OT}	4–2	Times Union Center (5,681); Albany, NY
12/01/2015*; 7:00 pm	at Cornell	L 80–81	4–3	Newman Arena (1,017); Ithaca, NY
12/04/2015; 7:00 pm, TWCSC	Manhattan	W 89–54	5–3 (1–0)	Times Union Center (5,727); Albany, NY
12/06/2015; 2:00 pm	at Saint Peter's	L 68–72	5–4 (1–1)	Yanitelli Center (338); Jersey City, NJ
12/09/2015*; 7:00 pm, TWCSC	Hofstra	W 81–68	6–4	Times Union Center (5,099); Albany, NY
12/12/2015*; 7:30 pm, TWCSC	Albany	W 78–70	7–4	Times Union Center (10,790); Albany, NY
12/22/2015*; 7:00 pm, TWCSC	St. Bonaventure; Franciscan Cup	W 73–70	8–4	Times Union Center (6,593); Albany, NY
12/29/2015*; 2:00 pm	at Vermont	L 64–73	8–5	Patrick Gym (2,437); Burlington, VT
01/02/2016; 7:00 pm, TWCSC	Niagara	W 75–63	9–5 (2–1)	Times Union Center (6,483); Albany, NY
01/04/2016; 7:00 pm, ESPN3	at Manhattan	L 87–92 ^{3OT}	9–6 (2–2)	Draddy Gymnasium (1,308); Riverdale, NY
01/07/2016; 7:00 pm, TWCSC	Fairfield	W 91–76	10–6 (3–2)	Times Union Center (5,193); Albany, NY
01/15/2016; 7:00 pm, ESPN3	at Quinnipiac	W 64-52	11-6 (4-2)	TD Bank Sports Center (1,428); Hamden, CT
01/18/2016; 4:04 pm, ESPN3	at Monmouth	L 69–85	11–7 (4–3)	Multipurpose Activity Center (3,911); West Long Branch, NJ
01/21/2016; 7:00 pm	Rider	W 63–52	12–7 (5–3)	Times Union Center (5,449); Albany, NY
01/24/2016; 2:00 pm, ESPN3	at Canisius	W 99–78	13–7 (6–3)	Koessler Athletic Center (1,614); Buffalo, NY
01/26/2016; 7:00 pm, TWCSC	at Niagara	W 82–70	14–7 (7–3)	Gallagher Center (1,098); Lewiston, NY
01/30/2016; 7:00 pm, TWCSC	Marist	W 77–66	15–7 (8–3)	Times Union Center (8,354); Albany, NY
02/01/2016; 7:00 pm	Monmouth	W 93–87	15–8 (8–4)	Times Union Center (7,016); Albany, NY
02/05/2016; 9:00 pm, ESPNU	Saint Peter's	W 69–52	16–8 (9–4)	Times Union Center (6,295); Albany, NY
02/07/2016; 12:00 pm	at Marist	W 79–73	16–9 (9–5)	McCann Field House (1,392); Poughkeepsie, NY
02/11/2016; 7:00 pm, TWCSC	Canisius	W 90–67	17–9 (10–5)	Times Union Center (5,477); Albany, NY
02/13/2016; 2:00 pm	at Iona	W 81–78	18–9 (11–5)	Hynes Athletic Center (2,611); New Rochelle, NY
02/19/2016; 7:00 pm, ESPN3	at Rider	W 84–64	19–9 (12–5)	Alumni Gymnasium (1,650); Lawrenceville, NJ
02/22/2016; 7:00 pm, TWCSC	Iona	L 81–87	19–10 (12–6)	Times Union Center (6,026); Albany, NY
02/24/2016; 7:00 pm	at Fairfield	L 69–76	19–11 (12–7)	Webster Bank Arena (1,785); Bridgeport, CT
02/28/2016; 2:00 pm, TWCSC	Quinnipiac	W 80–65	20–11 (13–7)	Times Union Center (7,636); Albany, NY
MAAC tournament
03/05/2016; 7:00 pm, ESPN3	Manhattan; Quarterfinals	W 89–76	21–11	Times Union Center (6,978); Albany, NY
03/06/2016; 7:00 pm, ESPN3	Iona; Semifinals	L 70–81	21–12	Times Union Center (5,722); Albany, NY
CBI
03/15/2016*; 7:00 pm	Morehead State; First round	L 80–84	21–13	Times Union Center (2,061); Albany, NY
*Non-conference game. ^{#}Rankings from AP Poll. (#) Tournament seedings in parentheses. All times are in Eastern Time.

== See also ==
- 2015–16 Siena Saints women's basketball team
