= 2016 National Invitation Tournament =

79th edition of the National Invitation Tournament

- Season: 2015–16
- Teams: 32
- Finals site: Madison Square Garden, New York City
- Champions: George Washington Colonials (1st title)
- Runner-up: Valparaiso Crusaders (1st title game)
- Semifinalists: Brigham Young Cougars (4th semifinal); San Diego State Aztecs (2nd semifinal)
- Winning coach: Mike Lonergan (1st title)
- MVP: Tyler Cavanaugh (George Washington)

The 2016 National Invitation Tournament was a single-elimination tournament of 32 NCAA Division I teams that were not selected to participate in the 2016 NCAA tournament. The annual tournament was played on campus sites for the first three rounds, with the Final Four and championship game being held at Madison Square Garden in New York City. The tournament began on Tuesday, March 15 and ended on Thursday, March 31. An experimental rule allowing players six personal fouls instead of five was approved for use in all national postseason tournaments except for the NCAA Tournament. The NIT Selection Show aired at 8:30 PM EDT on Sunday, March 13, 2016, on ESPNU. George Washington were the champions over Valparaiso 76–60. The Colonials victory was their first-ever NIT title.

== Participants ==
=== Automatic qualifiers ===
The following 15 teams earned automatic berths into the 2016 NIT field by virtue of having won their respective conference's regular season championship but failing to win their conference tournaments or receive an at-large NCAA bid.

Team	Conference	Record	Appearance	Last bid
Akron	MAC	26–8	4th	2012
Belmont	Ohio Valley	20–11	3rd	2014
Bucknell	Patriot	17–13	3rd	2015
High Point	Big South	21–10	2nd	2014
Hofstra	CAA	24–9	5th	2007
IPFW	Summit	24–9	1st	Never
Monmouth	MAAC	27–7	1st	Never
New Mexico State	WAC	23–10	5th	2000
North Florida	Atlantic Sun	22–11	1st	Never
Saint Mary's	WCC	27–5	5th	2015
San Diego State	Mountain West	25–9	6th	2009
Texas Southern	SWAC	18–14	2nd	2011
UAB	C-USA	26–6	12th	2010
Valparaiso	Horizon	26–6	3rd	2012
Wagner	NEC	22–10	3rd	2002

=== At-large bids ===
The following 17 teams were also awarded NIT berths.

Team	Conference	Record	Appearance	Last bid
Alabama	SEC	18–14	14th	2015
BYU	West Coast	23–10	12th	2013
Creighton	Big East	18–14	11th	2011
Davidson	Atlantic 10	20–12	7th	2014
Florida	SEC	19–14	10th	2009
Florida State	ACC	19–13	10th	2014
George Washington	Atlantic 10	23–10	6th	2015
Georgia	SEC	19–13	13th	2014
Georgia Tech	ACC	19–14	8th	2003
Houston	American	22–9	10th	2006
Long Beach State	Big West	20–14	8th	2013
Ohio State	Big Ten	20–13	9th	2008
Princeton	Ivy	22–6	6th	2002
South Carolina	SEC	24–8	12th	2009
St. Bonaventure	Atlantic 10	22–8	16th	2002
Virginia Tech	ACC	19–14	13th	2011
Washington	Pac-12	18–14	8th	2013

=== Seeds ===
The first four teams left out of the NCAA tournament were the top seeds in the four regions, as in last year's tournament. They were St. Bonaventure, South Carolina, Monmouth and Valparaiso.

St. Bonaventure Bracket
Seed	School	Conference	Record	Berth type
1	St. Bonaventure	Atlantic 10	22–8	At-large
2	BYU	West Coast	23–10	At-large
3	Virginia Tech	ACC	19–14	At-large
4	Creighton	Big East	18–14	At-large
5	Alabama	SEC	18–14	At-large
6	Princeton	Ivy	22–6	At-large
7	UAB	C-USA	26–6	Automatic
8	Wagner	Northeast	22–10	Automatic

Valparaiso Bracket
Seed	School	Conference	Record	Berth type
1	Valparaiso	Horizon	26–6	Automatic
2	Saint Mary's	West Coast	27–5	Automatic
3	Georgia	SEC	19–13	At-large
4	Florida State	ACC	19–13	At-large
5	Davidson	Atlantic 10	20–12	At-large
6	Belmont	Ohio Valley	20–11	Automatic
7	New Mexico State	WAC	23–10	Automatic
8	Texas Southern	SWAC	18–14	Automatic

South Carolina Bracket
Seed	School	Conference	Record	Berth type
1	South Carolina	SEC	24–8	At-large
2	San Diego State	Mountain West	25–9	Automatic
3	Washington	Pac-12	18–14	At-large
4	Georgia Tech	ACC	19–14	At-large
5	Houston	American	22–9	At-large
6	Long Beach State	Big West	20–14	At-large
7	IPFW	Summit	24–9	Automatic
8	High Point	Big South	21–10	Automatic

Monmouth Bracket
Seed	School	Conference	Record	Berth type
1	Monmouth	MAAC	27–7	Automatic
2	Florida	SEC	19–14	At-large
3	Ohio State	Big Ten	20–13	At-large
4	George Washington	Atlantic 10	23–10	At-large
5	Hofstra	Colonial	24–9	Automatic
6	Akron	MAC	26–8	Automatic
7	North Florida	Atlantic Sun	22–11	Automatic
8	Bucknell	Patriot	17–13	Automatic

== Schedule ==
The NIT began on Tuesday March 15. The first three rounds were played on campus sites. The Final Four began on Tuesday, March 29 at Madison Square Garden in New York City, and ended there with the championship game on Thursday, March 31.

== Bracket ==
^Florida was not able to host home games at the O'Connell Center due to arena renovations.

First round
1	Monmouth	90
8	Bucknell	80
4	George Washington	82
5	Hofstra	80
2	Florida^	97
7	North Florida	68
3	Ohio State	72*
6	Akron	63

Second round
1	Monmouth	71
4	George Washington	87
2	Florida^	74
3	Ohio State	66

Quarterfinals
4	George Washington	82
2	Florida^	77

First round
1	St. Bonaventure	75
8	Wagner	79
4	Creighton	72
5	Alabama	54
2	BYU	97
7	UAB	79
3	Virginia Tech	86*
6	Princeton	81

Second round
8	Wagner	54
4	Creighton	87
2	BYU	80
3	Virginia Tech	77

Quarterfinals
4	Creighton	82
2	BYU	88

First round
1	South Carolina	88
8	High Point	66
4	Georgia Tech	81
5	Houston	62
2	San Diego State	79
7	IPFW	55
3	Washington	107
6	Long Beach State	102

Second round
1	South Carolina	66
4	Georgia Tech	83
2	San Diego State	93
3	Washington	78

Quarterfinals
4	Georgia Tech	56
2	San Diego State	72

First round
1	Valparaiso	84
8	Texas Southern	73
4	Florida State	84
5	Davidson	74
2	Saint Mary's	58
7	New Mexico State	56
3	Georgia	93
6	Belmont	84

Second round
1	Valparaiso	81
4	Florida State	69
2	Saint Mary's	77
3	Georgia	65

Quarterfinals
1	Valparaiso	60
2	Saint Mary's	44

Semifinals; March 29
1	Valparaiso	72
2	BYU	70
2	San Diego State	46
4	George Washington	65

Final; March 31
1	Valparaiso	60
4	George Washington	76

* Denotes overtime period

== Media ==
ESPN, Inc. had exclusive television rights to all NIT games. It will telecast every game across ESPN, ESPN2, ESPNU, and ESPN3 (ESPNews was used for the Valparaiso–Florida State game). Since 2011, Westwood One had exclusive radio rights to the semifinals and championship. In 2016 Scott Graham and Kelly Tripucka provided the call.

== See also ==
- 2016 Women's National Invitation Tournament
- 2016 NCAA Division I men's basketball tournament
- 2016 NCAA Division II men's basketball tournament
- 2016 NCAA Division III men's basketball tournament
- 2016 NCAA Division I women's basketball tournament
- 2016 NCAA Division II women's basketball tournament
- 2016 NCAA Division III women's basketball tournament
- 2016 NAIA Division I men's basketball tournament
- 2016 NAIA Division II men's basketball tournament
- 2016 NAIA Division II women's basketball tournament
- 2016 College Basketball Invitational
- 2016 CollegeInsider.com Postseason Tournament
