= 2015–16 Monmouth Hawks men's basketball team =

American college basketball season

2015–16 Monmouth Hawks men's basketball
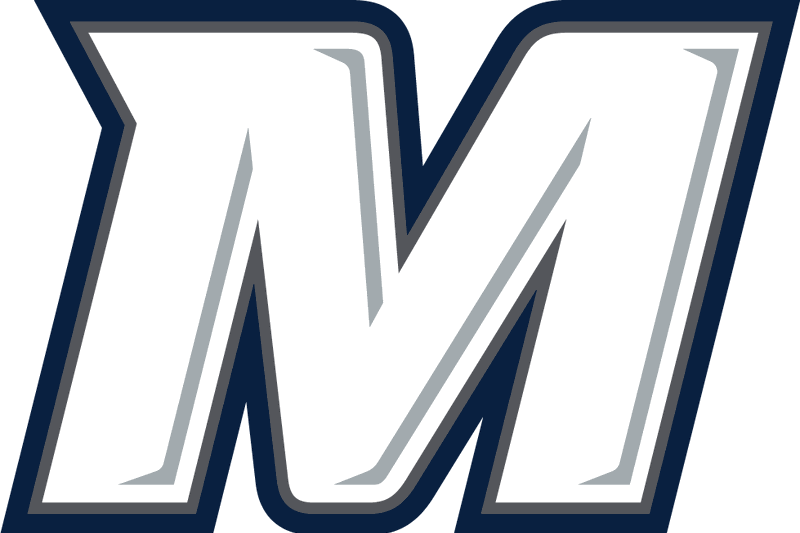

MAAC regular season champions

NIT, Second Round
- Conference: Metro Atlantic Athletic Conference
- Record: 28–8 (17–3 MAAC)
- Head coach: King Rice (5th season)
- Assistant coaches: Rick Callahan; Sam Ferry; Duane Woodward
- Home arena: Multipurpose Activity Center

2015–16 MAAC men's basketball standings
	Conf.				Overall
Team	W		L	PCT	W		L	PCT
Monmouth	17	–	3	.850	28	–	8	.778
Iona †	16	–	4	.800	22	–	11	.667
Siena	13	–	7	.650	21	–	13	.618
Fairfield	12	–	8	.600	19	–	14	.576
Saint Peter's	12	–	8	.600	14	–	16	.467
Manhattan	9	–	11	.450	13	–	18	.419
Canisius	8	–	12	.400	14	–	19	.424
Rider	8	–	12	.400	13	–	20	.394
Quinnipiac	6	–	14	.300	9	–	21	.300
Niagara	5	–	15	.250	7	–	25	.219
Marist	4	–	16	.200	7	–	23	.233
† 2016 MAAC tournament winner

The 2015–16 Monmouth Hawks men's basketball team represented Monmouth University during the 2015–16 NCAA Division I men's basketball season. The Hawks, led by fifth year head coach King Rice, played their home games at the Multipurpose Activity Center and were members of the Metro Atlantic Athletic Conference (MAAC). They finished the season 28–8, 17–3 in MAAC play to win the MAAC regular season championship. They defeated Rider and Fairfield to advance to the championship game of the MAAC tournament where they lost to Iona. As a regular season conference champion who failed to win their conference tournament, they received an automatic bid to the National Invitation Tournament. As one of the last four teams left out of the NCAA tournament, they received a #1 seed in the NIT where they defeated Bucknell in the first round to advance to the second round where they lost to George Washington.

This season is best known for Monmouth defeating five power conference opponents (UCLA, Notre Dame, USC, Georgetown, and Rutgers) and for the Hawks receiving votes in the AP poll for the first time ever.

== Previous season ==
The Hawks finished the 2014–15 season 18–15, 13–7 in MAAC play to finish in tie for third place. They lost in the quarterfinals of the MAAC tournament to Iona.

== Roster ==
2015–16 Monmouth Hawks men's basketball team
Players
Coaches

Pos.	#	Name	Height	Weight	Year	Hometown
G	0	Josh James (C)	6 ft 2 in (1.88 m)	200 lb (91 kg)	Jr	Greenburgh, NY
F	1	Pierre Sarr	6 ft 8 in (2.03 m)	195 lb (88 kg)	Fr	Dakar, Senegal
G	3	Tyler Robinson	6 ft 0 in (1.83 m)	195 lb (88 kg)	Fr	Lake Katrine, NY
F	4	Greg Noack	6 ft 8 in (2.03 m)	195 lb (88 kg)	Jr	Bethlehem, PA
G	5	Deon Jones (C)	6 ft 6 in (1.98 m)	200 lb (91 kg)	Sr	Wilmington, DE
G	10	Micah Seaborn	6 ft 5 in (1.96 m)	190 lb (86 kg)	RS Fr	Fort Worth, TX
G	11	Je'lon Hornbeak (C)	6 ft 3 in (1.91 m)	190 lb (86 kg)	RS Jr	Arlington, TX
G	12	Justin Robinson (C)	5 ft 8 in (1.73 m)	175 lb (79 kg)	Jr	Lake Katrine, NY
G	15	Daniel Pillari	5 ft 10 in (1.78 m)	170 lb (77 kg)	So	Oceanport, NJ
G	21	Zane Corbin (W)	5 ft 11 in (1.8 m)	195 lb (88 kg)	Sr	Jersey City, NJ
G	23	Austin Tilghman	6 ft 1 in (1.85 m)	230 lb (104 kg)	So	Wilmington, DE
G	24	Louie Pillari	6 ft 6 in (1.98 m)	200 lb (91 kg)	Fr	Tinton Falls, NJ
G	30	Collin Stewart	6 ft 8 in (2.03 m)	200 lb (91 kg)	RS Jr	Glenville, NY
F	32	Diago Quinn	6 ft 9 in (2.06 m)	255 lb (116 kg)	Fr	New York, NY
C	33	Zac Tillman	6 ft 10 in (2.08 m)	285 lb (129 kg)	Jr	Yeadon, PA
C	43	Chris Brady	6 ft 10 in (2.08 m)	250 lb (113 kg)	Jr	Greenlawn, NY

Head coach

- King Rice (North Carolina)

Assistant coach(es)

- Rick Callahan (Salem International)
- Sam Ferry (Vanderbilt)
- Duane Woodward (Boston College)

Legend

- (C) Team captain
- (S) Suspended
- (I) Ineligible
- (W) Walk-on
- Injured
- Current redshirt

Roster

== Schedule ==
Date time, TV	Rank^{#}	Opponent^{#}	Result	Record	Site (attendance) city, state
Exhibition
Nov 7*; 7:00 pm		Georgian Court	W 107–77		Multipurpose Activity Center (806); West Long Branch, NJ
Regular season
Nov 13*; 11:00 pm, P12N		at UCLA	W 84–81 ^{OT}	1–0	Pauley Pavilion (6,674); Los Angeles, CA
Nov 16*; 10:00 pm, P12N		at USC	L 90–101	1–1	Galen Center (2,230); Los Angeles, CA
Nov 21*; 2:00 pm		at Drexel	W 82–74	2–1	Daskalakis Athletic Center (1,522); Philadelphia, PA
Nov 26*; 6:30 pm, ESPNU		vs. No. 17 Notre Dame; AdvoCare Invitational quarterfinals	W 70–68	3–1	HP Field House (4,871); Orlando, FL
Nov 27*; 9:30 pm, ESPN2		vs. Dayton; AdvoCare Invitational semifinals	L 70–73	3–2	HP Field House (4,508); Orlando, FL
Nov 29*; 12:30 pm, ESPN2		vs. USC; AdvoCare Invitational 3rd place game	W 83–73	4–2	HP Field House (1,631); Orlando, FL
Dec 4; 7:00 pm, ESPN3		at Canisius	L 86–96	4–3 (0–1)	Koessler Athletic Center (1,554); Buffalo, NY
Dec 6; 2:00 pm		at Niagara	W 56–41	5–3 (1–1)	Gallagher Center (1,147); Lewiston, NY
Dec 13*; 2:00 pm, ESPN3		Wagner	W 73–54	6–3	Multipurpose Activity Center (3,901); West Long Branch, NJ
Dec 15*; 7:30 pm, FS1		at Georgetown	W 83–68	7–3	Verizon Center (5,258); Washington, D.C.
Dec 20*; 1:00 pm, BTN		at Rutgers	W 73–67	8–3	The RAC (6,637); Piscataway, NJ
Dec 23*; 6:00 pm		at Cornell	W 78–69	9–3	Newman Arena (2,034); Ithaca, NY
Dec 28*; 4:00 pm		at Army	L 84–91	9–4	Christl Arena (3,033); West Point, NY
Jan 4; 7:00 pm, ESPN3		Canisius	W 81–66	10–4 (2–1)	Multipurpose Activity Center (2,731); West Long Branch, NJ
Jan 9; 2:00 pm, ESPN3		Quinnipiac	W 88–74	11–4 (3–1)	Multipurpose Activity Center (3,911); West Long Branch, NJ
Jan 11; 7:00 pm, ESPN3, SNY		at Fairfield	W 86–74	12–4 (4–1)	Webster Bank Arena (1,237); Bridgeport, CT
Jan 15; 9:00 pm, ESPNU		at Iona	W 110–102	13–4 (5–1)	Hynes Athletic Center (2,611); New Rochelle, NY
Jan 18; 4:00 pm, ESPN3		Siena	W 85–69	14–4 (6–1)	Multipurpose Activity Center (3,911); West Long Branch, NJ
Jan 21; 8:00 pm, ESPN3		at Manhattan	L 71–78	14–5 (6–2)	Draddy Gymnasium (1,898); Riverdale, NY
Jan 24; 2:00 pm, ESPN3		Marist	W 83–72	15–5 (7–2)	Multipurpose Activity Center (2,785); West Long Branch, NJ
Jan 28; 7:00 pm		at Quinnipiac	W 66–51	16–5 (8–2)	TD Bank Sports Center (2,612); Hamden, CT
Jan 30; 7:00 pm, ESPN3		Saint Peter's	W 73–57	17–5 (9–2)	Multipurpose Activity Center (4,105); West Long Branch, NJ
Feb 1; 7:00 pm		at Siena	W 93–87	18–5 (10–2)	Times Union Center (7,016); Albany, NY
Feb 5; 7:00 pm, ESPN3		Fairfield	W 91–67	19–5 (11–2)	Multipurpose Activity Center (3,785); West Long Branch, NJ
Feb 9; 7:00 pm		at Marist	W 87–61	20–5 (12–2)	McCann Field House (1,648); Poughkeepsie, NY
Feb 12; 9:00 pm, ESPNU		at Rider	W 79–78	21–5 (13–5)	Alumni Gymnasium (1,650); Lawrenceville, NJ
Feb 15; 7:00 pm, ESPN3		Manhattan	W 79–70	22–5 (14–2)	Multipurpose Activity Center (3,040); West Long Branch, NJ
Feb 19; 7:00 pm, ESPNU		Iona	L 67–83	22–6 (14–3)	Multipurpose Activity Center (4,522); West Long Branch, NJ
Feb 21; 2:00 pm		at Saint Peter's	W 82–75	23–6 (15–3)	Yanitelli Center (1,013); Jersey City, NJ
Feb 26; 7:00 pm, ESPN2		Rider	W 79–58	24–6 (16–3)	Multipurpose Activity Center (4,194); West Long Branch, NJ
Feb 28; 5:00 pm, ESPN3		Niagara	W 77–68	25–6 (17–3)	Multipurpose Activity Center (4,172); West Long Branch, NJ
MAAC tournament
Mar 4; 7:00 pm, ESPN3	(1)	vs. (8) Rider; Quarterfinals	W 59–48	26–6	Times Union Center (1,269); Albany, NY
Mar 6; 4:30 pm, ESPN3	(1)	vs. (5) Fairfield; Semifinals	W 76–63	27–6	Times Union Center (5,722); Albany, NY
Mar 7; 7:00 pm, ESPN	(1)	vs. (2) Iona; Championship game	L 76–79	27–7	Times Union Center (3,115); Albany, NY
National Invitation tournament
Mar 15*; 7:30 pm, ESPN3	(1)	(8) Bucknell; First Round – Monmouth Bracket	W 90–80	28–7	Multipurpose Activity Center (4,102); West Long Branch, NJ
Mar 21*; 7:00 pm, ESPN2	(1)	(4) George Washington; Second Round – Monmouth Bracket	L 71–87	28–8	Multipurpose Activity Center (3,442); West Long Branch, NJ
*Non-conference game. ^{#}Rankings from AP Poll. (#) Tournament seedings in parentheses. All times are in Eastern Time.

== Rankings ==
Ranking movements Legend: RV = Received votes
	Week																				
Poll	Pre	1	2	3	4	5	6	7	8	9	10	11	12	13	14	15	16	17	18	19	Final
AP								RV	RV			RV			RV	RV					Not released
Coaches'								RV	RV			RV	RV	RV	RV	RV					
