= 2015–16 George Washington Colonials men's basketball team =

American college basketball season

2015–16 George Washington Colonials men's basketball

NIT Champions
- Conference: Atlantic 10 Conference
- Record: 28–10 (11–7 A-10)
- Head coach: Mike Lonergan (5th season)
- Assistant coaches: Hajj Turner; Maurice Joseph; Carmen Maciariello
- Home arena: Charles E. Smith Center

2015–16 Atlantic 10 men's basketball standings
	Conf.				Overall
Team	W		L	PCT	W		L	PCT
Dayton	14	–	4	.778	25	–	8	.758
VCU	14	–	4	.778	25	–	11	.694
St. Bonaventure	14	–	4	.778	22	–	9	.710
Saint Joseph's †	13	–	5	.722	28	–	8	.778
George Washington	11	–	7	.611	28	–	10	.737
Davidson	10	–	8	.556	20	–	13	.606
Rhode Island	9	–	9	.500	17	–	15	.531
Fordham	8	–	10	.444	17	–	14	.548
Richmond	7	–	11	.389	16	–	16	.500
UMass	6	–	12	.333	14	–	18	.438
Duquesne	6	–	12	.333	17	–	17	.500
George Mason	5	–	13	.278	11	–	21	.344
Saint Louis	5	–	13	.278	11	–	21	.344
La Salle	4	–	14	.222	9	–	22	.290
† 2016 A10 Tournament winner

The 2015–16 George Washington Colonials men's basketball team represented George Washington University during the 2015–16 NCAA Division I men's basketball season. The Colonials, led by fifth year head coach Mike Lonergan, played their home games at the Charles E. Smith Center and were members of the Atlantic 10 Conference. They finished the season 28–10, 11–7 in A-10 play to finish in fifth place. They defeated Saint Louis in the second round of the A-10 tournament to advance to the quarterfinals where they lost to Saint Joseph's. They received an invitation to the National Invitation Tournament. As a #4 seed, they defeated Hofstra, Monmouth, and Florida to advance to the semifinals at Madison Square Garden. At MSG, they defeated San Diego State and Valparaiso to become the 2016 NIT champions.

On September 17, 2016, following an investigation into allegations of verbal abuse of his players, head coach Mike Lonergan was fired. He finished at George Washington with a five-year record of 97–70.

== Previous season ==
The Colonials finished the 2014–15 season 22–13, 10–8 in A-10 play to finish in a three way tie for sixth place. They advanced to the quarterfinals of the A-10 tournament where they lost to Rhode Island. They were invited to the National Invitation Tournament where they defeated Pittsburgh in the first round before losing in the second round to Temple.

== Departures ==
Name	Number	Pos.	Height	Weight	Year	Hometown	Notes
Nick Griffin	5	G	6'3"	173	Sophomore	Rockville, MD	Transferred to Saint Peter's
Kethan Savage	11	G	6'3"	200	Junior	Fairfax, VA	Transferred to Butler
Darian Bryant	15	G	6'4"	200	Freshman	Washington, D.C.	Transferred to Delaware State
Ryan McCoy	20	F	6'9"	207	RS Junior	Skillman, NJ	Walk-on; graduated
John Kopriva	34	F	6'8"	214	Senior	Milwaukee, WI	Graduated

=== Incoming transfers ===
Name	Number	Pos.	Height	Weight	Year	Hometown	Previous School
Alex Mitola	1	G	5'11"	170	Senior	Florham Park, NJ	Transferred from Dartmouth. Will be eligible to play immediately since Mitola graduated from Dartmouth.
Jaren Sina	23	G	6'2"	185	Junior	Lake Hopatcong, NJ	Transferred from Seton Hall. Under NCAA transfer rules, Sina will have to sit out from the 2015–16 season. Will have two years of remaining eligibility.

== Incoming recruits ==
College recruiting
Name	Hometown	School	Height	Weight	Commit date
Jordan Roland; SG	Syracuse, NY	Westhill High School	6 ft 2 in (1.88 m)	160 lb (73 kg)	Jul 14, 2014
Jordan Roland; SG	Recruit ratings: Scout: Rivals: (68)				
Collin Goss; PF	Manassas, VA	St. Stephen's & St. Agnes School	6 ft 10 in (2.08 m)	215 lb (98 kg)	May 3, 2014
Collin Goss; PF	Recruit ratings: Scout: Rivals: (65)				
Overall recruit ranking:
Note: In many cases, Scout, Rivals, 247Sports, On3, and ESPN may conflict in their listings of height and weight.; In these cases, the average was taken. ESPN grades are on a 100-point scale.; Sources: "2015 Team Ranking". Rivals.

== Roster ==
2015–16 George Washington Colonials men's basketball team
Players
Coaches

Pos.	#	Name	Height	Weight	Year	Hometown
G	1	Alex Mitola	5 ft 11 in (1.8 m)	170 lb (77 kg)	Sr	Florham Park, NJ
G	3	Paul Jorgensen	6 ft 2 in (1.88 m)	185 lb (84 kg)	So	Ramsey, NJ
G/F	4	Anthony Swan	6 ft 7 in (2.01 m)	196 lb (89 kg)	So	Los Angeles, CA
F	12	Yuta Watanabe	6 ft 8 in (2.03 m)	197 lb (89 kg)	So	Kagawa, Japan
G/F	13	Patricio Garino	6 ft 6 in (1.98 m)	210 lb (95 kg)	Sr	Mar del Plata, Argentina
G	14	Jordan Roland	6 ft 1 in (1.85 m)	172 lb (78 kg)	Fr	Syracuse, NY
F	21	Kevin Larsen	6 ft 10 in (2.08 m)	265 lb (120 kg)	Sr	Copenhagen, Denmark
G	22	Joe McDonald	6 ft 1 in (1.85 m)	190 lb (86 kg)	Sr	Lorton, VA
G	23	Jaren Sina (I) (redshirt)	6 ft 2 in (1.88 m)	193 lb (88 kg)	Jr	Lake Hopatcong, NJ
G	30	Matt Hart (W)	6 ft 1 in (1.85 m)	182 lb (83 kg)	RS Jr	Orchard Park, NY
F	33	Collin Goss	6 ft 10 in (2.08 m)	215 lb (98 kg)	Fr	Manassas, VA
F	34	Tyler Cavanaugh	6 ft 9 in (2.06 m)	238 lb (108 kg)	RS Jr	Syracuse, NY
F	45	Matt Cimino	6 ft 10 in (2.08 m)	212 lb (96 kg)	So	Falmouth, ME

Head coach

- Mike Lonergan (Catholic)

Assistant coach(es)

- Hajj Turner (Louisville)
- Maurice Joseph (Vermont)
- Carmen Maciariello (Siena)

Legend

- (C) Team captain
- (S) Suspended
- (I) Ineligible
- (W) Walk-on
- Injured
- Current redshirt

Roster

== Rankings ==
Ranking movements Legend: ██ Increase in ranking ██ Decrease in ranking — = Not ranked RV = Received votes
	Week																		
Poll	Pre	1	2	3	4	5	6	7	8	9	10	11	12	13	14	15	16	17	Final
AP	—	—	—	RV	RV	RV	21	20	RV	RV	—	—	—	RV	—	—	—	—	—
Coaches'	—	—	—	RV	RV	RV	22	20	RV	RV	RV	—	—	—	—	—	—	—	—

== Accolades ==
=== Honors and awards ===
- Tyler Cavanaugh

All-Atlantic 10 (2nd team)
Academic Academic All-Conference

- Patricio Garino

All-Atlantic 10 (2nd team)
All-Atlantic 10 Defensive team
Academic Academic All-Conference
Team Argentina 2016 Summer Olympics

- Alex Mitola

Academic Academic All-Conference

=== Records ===
- Team

Winningest team in program history (28-10)
First postseason championship in program history (2016 NIT Champions)

== Schedule ==
Date time, TV	Rank^{#}	Opponent^{#}	Result	Record	High points	High rebounds	High assists	Site (attendance) city, state
Exhibition
11/07/2015*; 7:00 pm		Gannon	W 92–47		15 – Watanabe	6 – Tied	4 – Larsen	Charles E. Smith Center (2,108); Washington, D.C.
Non-conference regular season
11/13/2015*; 7:00 pm, CSN		Lafayette	W 85–76	1–0	24 – Larsen	17 – Cavanaugh	4 – Jorgensen	Charles E. Smith Center (3,118); Washington, D.C.
11/16/2015*; 7:30 pm, ESPN2		No. 6 Virginia; College Hoops Tip-Off Marathon	W 73–68	2–0	18 – Tied	7 – 3 tied	5 – Larsen	Charles E. Smith Center (5,025); Washington, D.C.
11/19/2015*; 7:00 pm, ESPN3		at South Florida	W 73–67	3–0	18 – Garino	13 – McDonald	4 – Watanabe	USF Sun Dome (2,790); Tampa, FL
11/22/2015*; 7:30 pm		Army; Barclays Center Classic	W 92–81	4–0	21 – Larsen	9 – Cavanaugh	4 – McDonald	Charles E. Smith Center (2,775); Washington, D.C.
11/24/2015*; 11:00 am		Gardner–Webb; Barclays Center Classic	W 94–65	5–0	20 – Cavanaugh	10 – McDonald	3 – 4 tied	Charles E. Smith Center (3,796); Washington, D.C.
11/27/2015*; 9:00 pm, ASN		vs. Tennessee; Barclays Center Classic semifinals	W 73–70	6–0	18 – Cavanaugh	10 – Larsen	5 – Garino	Barclays Center; Brooklyn, NY
11/28/2015*; 2:30 pm, ASN		vs. No. 24 Cincinnati; Barclays Center Classic Final	L 56–61	6–1	15 – Garino	7 – Larsen	4 – Larsen	Barclays Center; Brooklyn, NY
12/02/2015*; 7:00 pm, ASN		Seton Hall	W 72–64	7–1	16 – Tied	7 – Cavanaugh	4 – Larsen	Charles E. Smith Center (2,280); Washington, D.C.
12/08/2015*; 7:00 pm, CSN		Penn State	W 76–66	8–1	18 – Cavanaugh	10 – Cavanaugh	5 – Larsen	Charles E. Smith Center (3,262); Washington, D.C.
12/12/2015*; 4:30 pm, CBSSN		Rutgers	W 83–49	9–1	22 – Cavanaugh	7 – Larsen	5 – Jorgensen	Charles E. Smith Center (3,172); Washington, D.C.
12/19/2015*; 1:00 pm	No. 21	Saint Peter's	W 87–74	10–1	18 – Cavanaugh	11 – Larsen	5 – 5 tied	Charles E. Smith Center (2,880); Washington, D.C.
12/22/2015*; 9:00 pm, FS1	No. 20	at DePaul	L 61–82	10–2	17 – Larsen	11 – Larsen	4 – Jorgensen	Allstate Arena (5,289); Rosemont, IL
12/29/2015*; 7:00 pm, ASN		at UCF	W 67–50	11–2	17 – Garino	8 – Tied	5 – McDonald	CFE Arena (3,889); Orlando, FL
Atlantic 10 regular season
01/03/2016; 7:00 pm, NBCSN		Fordham	W 69–63	12–2 (1–0)	21 – Cavanaugh	11 – Larsen	4 – McDonald	Charles E. Smith Center (2,813); Washington, D.C.
01/06/2016; 7:00 pm, FSMW		at Saint Louis	L 62–65	12–3 (1–1)	14 – Larsen	7 – Tied	4 – McDonald	Chaifetz Arena (5,104); St. Louis, MO
01/09/2016; 8:00 pm, ASN		Duquesne	W 91–64	13–3 (2–1)	30 – Cavanaugh	11 – Larsen	5 – Jorgensen	Charles E. Smith Center (3,103); Washington, D.C.
01/12/2016; 7:00 pm, ASN/CSN		at Massachusetts	W 81–70	14–3 (3–1)	26 – Cavanaugh	8 – Larsen	7 – Mitola	Mullins Center (2,571); Amherst, MA
01/15/2016; 7:00 pm, ESPN2		at Dayton	L 70–77	14–4 (3–2)	18 – Cavanaugh	10 – Larsen	7 – Mitola	UD Arena (12,831); Dayton, OH
01/22/2016; 7:00 pm, ESPN2		Rhode Island	W 62–58	15–4 (4–2)	13 – Cavanaugh	10 – Cavanaugh	3 – McDonald	Charles E. Smith Center (2,913); Washington, D.C.
01/28/2016; 9:00 pm, ESPNU		Richmond	L 90–98 ^{2OT}	15–5 (4–3)	17 – Garino; Larsen	14 – Cavanaugh	5 – Larsen	Charles E. Smith Center (3,367); Washington, D.C.
01/31/2016; 12:00 pm, NBCSN		at George Mason	W 76–70	16–5 (5–3)	19 – Garino	11 – Larsen	3 – Jorgensen	EagleBank Arena (5,168); Fairfax, VA
02/03/2016; 7:00 pm, ASN/MASN		Davidson	W 79–69	17–5 (6–3)	17 – Garino	10 – McDonald	3 – Larsen	Charles E. Smith Center (2,918); Washington, D.C.
02/06/2016; 12:00 pm, CBSSN		at VCU	W 72–69	18–5 (7–3)	27 – Garino	8 – Cavanaugh	3 – Tied	Siegel Center (7,637); Richmond, VA
02/10/2016; 7:00 pm, CSN/SNY		Saint Joseph's	L 66–84	18–6 (7–4)	17 – Cavanaugh	9 – Larsen	7 – McDonald	Charles E. Smith Center (3,091); Washington, D.C.
02/13/2016; 4:00 pm		at St. Bonaventure	L 57–64	18–7 (7–5)	21 – Garino	11 – Larsen	4 – McDonald	Reilly Center (5,480); Olean, NY
02/17/2016; 7:00 pm		at Duquesne	W 81–74	19–7 (8–5)	16 – Larsen	12 – Larsen	3 – Tied	Palumbo Center (1,520); Pittsburgh, PA
02/21/2016; 12:00 pm, NBCSN		La Salle	W 90–50	20–7 (9–5)	22 – Cavanaugh	8 – Garino	7 – Jorgensen	Charles E. Smith Center (3,002); Washington, D.C.
02/24/2016; 7:00 pm, ASN/MASN2		at Richmond	W 73–61	21–7 (10–5)	16 – Garino	12 – Cavanaugh	2 – Tied	Robins Center (7,201); Richmond, VA
02/27/2016; 12:30 pm, NBCSN		VCU	L 65–69	21–8 (10–6)	19 – Cavanaugh	7 – Larsen	4 – McDonald	Charles E. Smith Center (4,385); Washington, D.C.
03/01/2016; 8:00 pm, ASN/CSN		George Mason	W 74–52	22–8 (11–6)	17 – Tied	10 – Cavanaugh	5 – McDonald	Charles E. Smith Center (3,031); Washington, D.C.
03/05/2016; 3:30 pm, NBCSN		at Davidson	L 80–87	22–9 (11–7)	22 – Tied	12 – Larsen	6 – Watanabe	John M. Belk Arena (5,157); Davidson, NC
Atlantic 10 tournament
03/10/2016; 2:30 pm, NBCSN	(5)	vs. (13) Saint Louis; Second Round	W 73–65	23–9	19 – Watanabe	8 – Cavanaugh	10 – McDonald	Barclays Center (6,519); Brooklyn, NY
03/11/2016; 2:30 pm, NBCSN	(5)	vs. (4) Saint Joseph's; Quarterfinals	L 80–86	23–10	15 – McDonald	11 – Cavanaugh	9 – Larsen	Barclays Center (8,223); Brooklyn, NY
NIT
03/16/2016*; 8:00 pm, ESPN3	(4)	(5) Hofstra; First Round – Monmouth Bracket	W 82–80	24–10	20 – Cavanaugh	11 – Cavanaugh	7 – Larsen	Charles E. Smith Center (1,083); Washington, D.C.
03/21/2016*; 7:00 pm, ESPN	(4)	at (1) Monmouth; Second Round – Monmouth Bracket	W 87–71	25–10	22 – Cavanaugh	12 – Cavanaugh	5 – Larsen	Multipurpose Activity Center (3,442); West Long Branch, NJ
03/23/2016*; 7:00 pm, ESPN2	(4)	(2) Florida; Quarterfinals – Monmouth Bracket	W 82–77	26–10	23 – Cavanaugh	13 – Larsen	3 – 3 tied	Charles E. Smith Center (3,399); Washington, D.C.
03/29/2016*; 9:00 pm, ESPN	(4)	vs. (2) San Diego State; Semifinals	W 65–46	27–10	20 – Cavanaugh	11 – Cavanaugh	6 – McDonald	Madison Square Garden (8,298); New York, NY
03/31/2016*; 7:00 pm, ESPN	(4)	vs. (1) Valparaiso; Championship	W 76–60	28–10	18 – Larsen	8 – McDonald	4 – McDonald	Madison Square Garden (7,016); New York, NY
*Non-conference game. ^{#}Rankings from AP Poll. (#) Tournament seedings in parentheses. All times are in Eastern Time.

== See also ==
- 2015–16 George Washington Colonials women's basketball team
