= 2015–16 Iona Gaels men's basketball team =

American college basketball season

2015–16 Iona Gaels men's basketball
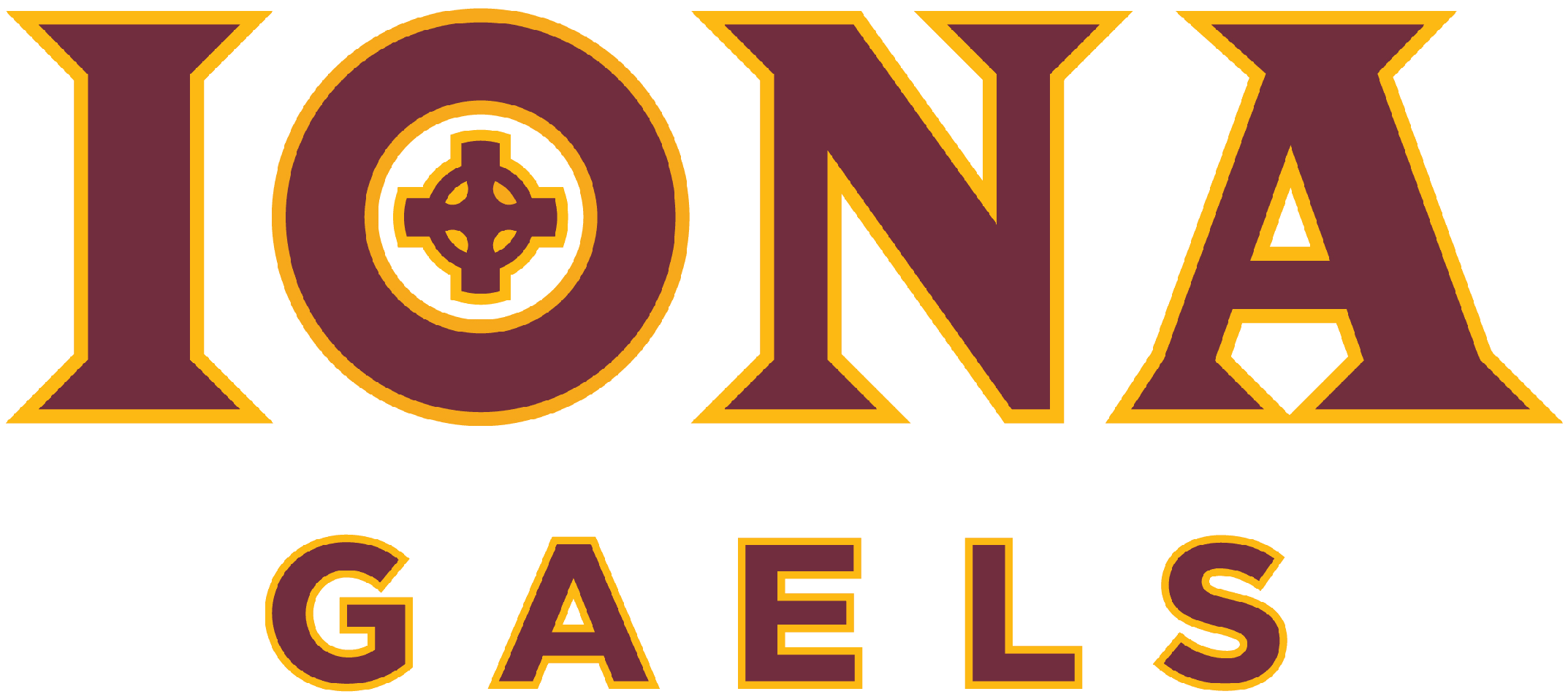

MAAC tournament champions

NCAA tournament, First Round
- Conference: Metro Atlantic Athletic Conference
- Record: 22–11 (16–4 MAAC)
- Head coach: Tim Cluess (6th season)
- Assistant coaches: Jared Grasso; Brock Erickson; Mark Calzonetti
- Home arena: Hynes Athletic Center

2015–16 MAAC men's basketball standings
	Conf.				Overall
Team	W		L	PCT	W		L	PCT
Monmouth	17	–	3	.850	28	–	8	.778
Iona †	16	–	4	.800	22	–	11	.667
Siena	13	–	7	.650	21	–	13	.618
Fairfield	12	–	8	.600	19	–	14	.576
Saint Peter's	12	–	8	.600	14	–	16	.467
Manhattan	9	–	11	.450	13	–	18	.419
Canisius	8	–	12	.400	14	–	19	.424
Rider	8	–	12	.400	13	–	20	.394
Quinnipiac	6	–	14	.300	9	–	21	.300
Niagara	5	–	15	.250	7	–	25	.219
Marist	4	–	16	.200	7	–	23	.233
† 2016 MAAC tournament winner

The 2015–16 Iona Gaels men's basketball team represented Iona College during the 2015–16 NCAA Division I men's basketball season. The Gaels, led by sixth year head coach Tim Cluess, played their home games at the Hynes Athletic Center and were members of the Metro Atlantic Athletic Conference (MAAC). They finished the season 22–11, 16–4 in MAAC play to finish in second place. They defeated Canisius, Siena, and Monmouth to be champions of the MAAC tournament and earn the conference's automatic bid to the NCAA tournament where, as a #13 seed, they lost in the first round to Iowa State.

== Previous season ==
The Gaels finished the 2014–15 season 26–9, 17–3 in MAAC play to win the MAAC regular season championship. Iona lost to Manhattan in the championship game of the MAAC tournament and earned an automatic bid to the National Invitation Tournament. In the NIT, they lost in the first round to Rhode Island.

== Roster ==
2015–16 Iona Gaels men's basketball team
Players
Coaches

Pos.	#	Name	Height	Weight	Year	Previous school	Hometown
G	0	Rickey McGill	6 ft 1 in (1.85 m)	165 lb (75 kg)	Fr	Spring Valley	Spring Valley, New York
G	1	Isaiah Williams	6 ft 7 in (2.01 m)	190 lb (86 kg)	Sr	Malcolm X Shabazz; State College Florida Manatee	Newark, New Jersey
G	2	Kelvin Amayo	6 ft 4 in (1.93 m)	220 lb (100 kg)	Sr	NIA Prep; Marshall	Newark, New Jersey
G	3	Ibn Muhammad	5 ft 9 in (1.75 m)	155 lb (70 kg)	RS Sr	Bishop McNamara; Harcum College	Laurel, Maryland
G	4	Schadrac Casimir	5 ft 10 in (1.78 m)	155 lb (70 kg)	So	Trinity Catholic; South Kent School	Stamford, Connecticut
G	5	A. J. English	6 ft 4 in (1.93 m)	190 lb (86 kg)	Sr	Appoquinimink; St. Thomas More (CT)	Wilmington, Delaware
G	10	Dashawn Richmond	6 ft 3 in (1.91 m)	200 lb (91 kg)	Sr	Curtis; Cal State Bakersfield	Staten Island, New York
G	13	Jahaad Proctor	6 ft 3 in (1.91 m)	175 lb (79 kg)	Fr	Harrisburg	Harrisburg, Pennsylvania
F	15	Deyshonee Much	6 ft 5 in (1.96 m)	170 lb (77 kg)	So	Redemption Christ Academy; Buffalo	Rochester, New York
G	22	Taylor Bessick	6 ft 9 in (2.06 m)	225 lb (102 kg)	Jr	Rise Academy; James Madison	Philadelphia, Pennsylvania
F	23	Jordan Washington	6 ft 8 in (2.03 m)	255 lb (116 kg)	Jr	Pathways; Indian Hills	Jamaica, New York
G	24	Benjamin Nwokeabia	6 ft 5 in (1.96 m)	165 lb (75 kg)	Fr	College Duleman; Impact Academy, FL	Geneva, Switzerland
G	25	Aaron Rountree	6 ft 8 in (2.03 m)	200 lb (91 kg)	Sr	Greenfield; Wake Forest	Wilson, North Carolina
F	32	Ryden Hines	6 ft 10 in (2.08 m)	225 lb (102 kg)	Jr	Dimond; Impact Academy, NV	Anchorage, Alaska
F	33	Saren Westropo	6 ft 7 in (2.01 m)	190 lb (86 kg)	Fr	Lethbridge Collegiate Institute	Lethbridge, Alberta, Canada

Head coach

- Tim Cluess (Hofstra)

Assistant coach(es)

- Jared Grasso (Quinnipiac)
- Brock Erickson (Assumption (MA))
- Mark Calzonetti (Bentley)

Legend

- (C) Team captain
- (S) Suspended
- (I) Ineligible
- (W) Walk-on
- Injured
- Current redshirt

Roster
Last update: 2015-11-13

== Schedule ==
Date time, TV	Rank^{#}	Opponent^{#}	Result	Record	Site (attendance) city, state
Regular season
11/15/2015*; 2:30 pm, ESPN3		at Valparaiso; Beaver Showcase	L 58–83	0–1	Athletics–Recreation Center (2,769); Valparaiso, IN
11/17/2015*; 10:00 pm, P12N		at Oregon State; Beaver Showcase	L 73–93	0–2	Gill Coliseum (4,344); Corvallis, OR
11/20/2015*; 7:00 pm		Delaware	W 92–77	1–2	Hynes Athletic Center (2,200); New Rochelle, NY
12/01/2015; 7:00 pm		Fairfield	W 101–77	2–2 (1–0)	Hynes Athletic Center (1,621); New Rochelle, NY
12/04/2015; 7:00 pm		at Marist	W 101–66	3–2 (2–0)	McCann Field House (1,471); Poughkeepsie, NY
12/08/2015*; 8:00 pm, ESPN3		at Tulsa	L 81–90	3–3	Reynolds Center (3,800); Tulsa, OK
12/16/2015*; 7:00 pm		Texas Southern	W 83–73	4–3	Hynes Athletic Center (1,326); New Rochelle, NY
12/19/2015*; 7:00 pm		at Rhode Island	L 74–79	4–4	Ryan Center (3,645); Kingston, RI
12/22/2015*; 3:00 pm		vs. UC Santa Barbara; South Point Holiday Hoops Classic	L 76–80	4–5	South Point Arena (250); Enterprise, NV
12/23/2015*; 3:00 pm		vs. Akron; South Point Holiday Hoops Classic	L 64–78	4–6	South Point Arena (225); Enterprise, NV
12/28/2015*; 7:00 pm		Drexel	W 77–70	5–6	Hynes Athletic Center (2,177); New Rochelle, NY
01/02/2016; 2:00 pm		at Quinnipiac	W 78–66	6–6 (3–0)	TD Bank Sports Center (1,612); Hamden, CT
01/04/2016; 7:00 pm		Niagara	W 65–42	7–6 (4–0)	Hynes Athletic Center (1,081); New Rochelle, NY
01/07/2016; 8:00 pm, ESPN3		Rider	W 67–58	8–6 (5–0)	Hynes Athletic Center (1,277); New Rochelle, NY
01/09/2016; 4:00 pm		Marist	W 90–80	9–6 (6–0)	Hynes Athletic Center (1,476); New Rochelle, NY
01/15/2016; 9:00 pm, ESPNU		Monmouth	L 102–110	9–7 (6–1)	Hynes Athletic Center (2,611); New Rochelle, NY
01/17/2016; 4:00 pm, ESPN3		at Rider	L 75–79	9–8 (6–2)	Alumni Gymnasium (1,517); Lawrenceville, NJ
01/22/2016; 7:00 pm		Saint Peter's	W 64–58	10–8 (7–2)	Hynes Athletic Center (1,250); New Rochelle, NY
01/24/2016; 3:30 pm		at Fairfield	L 91–98	10–9 (7–3)	Webster Bank Arena (1,278); Bridgeport, CT
01/29/2016; 7:00 pm, ESPNU		Manhattan	W 70–56	11–9 (8–3)	Hynes Athletic Center (2,611); New Rochelle, NY
02/01/2016; 7:00 pm		at Saint Peter's	W 64–58	10–8 (7–2)	Yanitelli Center (1,250); Jersey City, NY
02/05/2016; 7:00 pm		at Canisius	W 84–66	13–9 (10–3)	Koessler Athletic Center (1,702); Buffalo, NY
02/07/2016; 2:00 pm		at Niagara	W 75–61	14–9 (11–3)	Gallagher Center (1,154); Lewiston, NY
02/13/2016; 2:00 pm		Siena	L 78–81	14–10 (11–4)	Hynes Athletic Center (2,611); New Rochelle, NY
02/15/2016; 7:00 pm		Quinnipiac	W 78–59	15–10 (12–4)	Hynes Athletic Center (1,421); New Rochelle, NY
02/19/2016; 7:00 pm, ESPNU/ESPN3		at Monmouth	W 93–67	16–10 (13–4)	Multipurpose Activity Center (4,522); West Long Branch, NJ
02/22/2016; 7:00 pm		at Siena	W 87–81	17–10 (14–4)	Times Union Center (6,026); Albany, NY
02/26/2016; 7:00 pm, ESPNU		at Manhattan	W 86–72	18–10 (15–4)	Draddy Gymnasium (2,520); Riverdale, NY
02/28/2016; 4:00 pm, ESPN3		Canisius	W 86–78	19–10 (16–4)	Hynes Athletic Center (2,079); New Rochelle, NY
MAAC tournament
03/04/2016; 9:30 pm, ESPN3	(2)	vs. (7) Canisius; Quarterfinals	W 73–55	20–10	Times Union Center (1,269); Albany, NY
03/06/2016; 7:00 pm, ESPN3	(2)	vs. (3) Siena; Semifinals	W 81–70	21–10	Times Union Center (5,722); Albany, NY
03/07/2016; 7:00 pm, ESPN	(2)	vs. (1) Monmouth; Championship	W 79–76	22–10	Times Union Center (3,115); Albany, NY
NCAA tournament
03/17/2016*; 2:00 pm, TBS	(13 MW)	vs. (4 MW) No. 22 Iowa State; First Round	L 81–94	22–11	Pepsi Center (19,499); Denver, CO
*Non-conference game. ^{#}Rankings from AP Poll. (#) Tournament seedings in parentheses. MW=Midwest. All times are in Eastern Time.
