= 2015–16 Canisius Golden Griffins men's basketball team =

American college basketball season

2015–16 Canisius Golden Griffins men's basketball
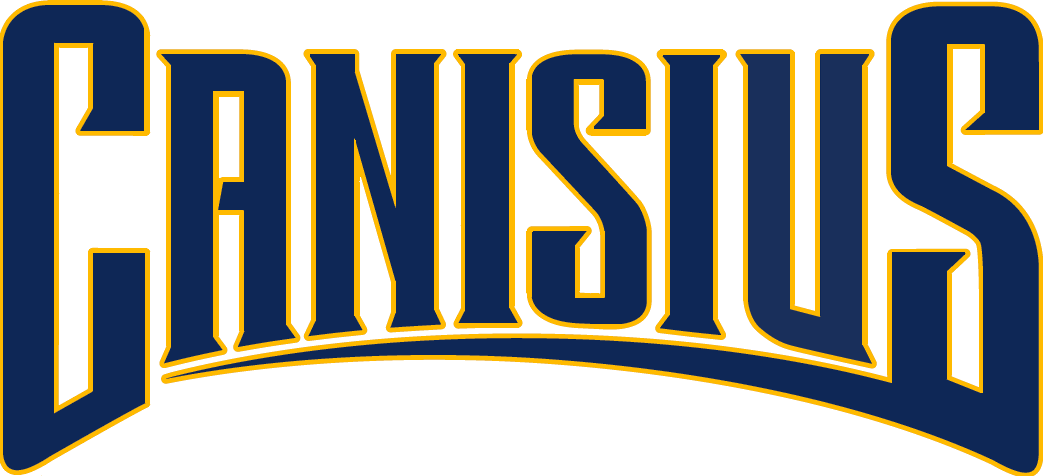

Las Vegas Classic Upper Division champions
- Conference: Metro Atlantic Athletic Conference
- Record: 14–19 (8–12 MAAC)
- Head coach: Jim Baron (4th season)
- Assistant coaches: Pat Clarke; Fred Dupree; Mike Iuzzolino
- Home arena: Koessler Athletic Center

2015–16 MAAC men's basketball standings
	Conf.				Overall
Team	W		L	PCT	W		L	PCT
Monmouth	17	–	3	.850	28	–	8	.778
Iona †	16	–	4	.800	22	–	11	.667
Siena	13	–	7	.650	21	–	13	.618
Fairfield	12	–	8	.600	19	–	14	.576
Saint Peter's	12	–	8	.600	14	–	16	.467
Manhattan	9	–	11	.450	13	–	18	.419
Canisius	8	–	12	.400	14	–	19	.424
Rider	8	–	12	.400	13	–	20	.394
Quinnipiac	6	–	14	.300	9	–	21	.300
Niagara	5	–	15	.250	7	–	25	.219
Marist	4	–	16	.200	7	–	23	.233
† 2016 MAAC tournament winner

The 2015–16 Canisius Golden Griffins men's basketball team represented Canisius College during the 2015–16 NCAA Division I men's basketball season. The Golden Griffins, led by fourth year head coach Jim Baron, played their home games at the Koessler Athletic Center and were members of the Metro Atlantic Athletic Conference. They finished the season 14–19, 8–12 in MAAC play to finish in a tie for seventh place. They defeated Niagara in the first round of the MAAC tournament to advance the quarterfinals where they lost to Iona.

On May 20, head coach Jim Baron announced his retirement. He finished at Canisius with a four year record of 73–59.

== Roster ==
Number	Name	Position	Height	Weight	Year	Hometown
00	Ronnie Gombe	Forward	6–8	230	Sophomore	Nairobi, Kenya
1	Malcolm McMillan	Guard	6–0	180	Senior	Baltimore, Maryland
2	Jermaine Crumpton	Forward	6–6	245	Sophomore	Niagara Falls, New York
3	Raven Owen	Guard	5–10	155	RS–Freshman	Staten Island, New York
4	Kiefer Douse	Guard	6–3	175	Junior	Brampton, Ontario, Canada
5	Kassius Robertson	Guard	6–3	175	Sophomore	Toronto, Ontario, Canada
10	Cassidy Ryan	Forward	6–6	215	Sophomore	Mississauga, Ontario, Canada
11	Chris Atkinson	Guard	5–9	155	Freshman	Hempstead, New York
13	Isaiah Gurley	Guard	6–3	195	Freshman	Brooklyn, New York
14	Kevin Bleeker	Center	6–11	230	Senior	Alkmaar, Netherlands
22	Phil Valenti	Forward	6–7	200	Junior	Victor, New York
23	Jamal Reynolds	Guard	6–4	175	Senior	Pickering, Ontario, Canada
25	Adam Weir	Guard	6–4	190	Sophomore	Tonawanda, New York

== Schedule ==
Date time, TV	Opponent	Result	Record	Site (attendance) city, state
Exhibition
10/30/2015*; 7:00 pm	Ryerson	W 81–61		Koessler Athletic Center (813); Buffalo, NY
11/06/2015*; 7:00 pm	Buffalo State	W 106–67		Koessler Athletic Center (1,113); Buffalo, NY
Regular season
11/13/2015*; 7:00 pm	at Hofstra	L 85–96	0–1	Mack Sports Complex (2,106); Hempstead, NY
11/16/2015*; 7:00 pm, ESPN3	Lehigh	W 98–89	1–1	Koessler Athletic Center (1,153); Buffalo, NY
11/21/2015*; 3:15 pm, ESPN3	Cornell	W 87–62	2–1	Koessler Athletic Center (1,310); Buffalo, NY
11/24/2015*; 7:00 pm, ESPN3	St. Bonaventure	L 73–77	2–2	Koessler Athletic Center (2,007); Buffalo, NY
11/28/2015*; 2:00 pm	at Buffalo	L 96–98 ^{OT}	2–3	Alumni Arena (3112); Amherst, NY
12/04/2015; 7:00 pm, ESPN3	Monmouth	W 96–86	3–3 (1–0)	Koessler Athletic Center (1,544); Buffalo, NY
12/05/2015; 7:00 pm, ESPN3	Quinnipiac	L 76–78	3–4 (1–1)	Koessler Athletic Center (984); Buffalo, NY
12/10/2015*; 7:00 pm, BTN+	at Penn State; Las Vegas Classic	L 67–81	3–5	Rec Hall (4,509); University Park, PA
12/12/2015*; 7:00 pm	at Kent State; Las Vegas Classic	L 77–84	3–6	MAC Center (3,107); Kent, OH
12/19/2015*; 2:00 pm, ESPN3	Boston University	W 84–68	4–6	Koessler Athletic Center (926); Buffalo, NY
12/22/2015*; 5:30 pm	vs. Louisiana–Monroe; Las Vegas Classic	W 108–96 ^{3OT}	5–6	Orleans Arena (2,120); Paradise, NV
12/23/2015*	vs. Nicholls State; Las Vegas Classic	W 83–74	6–6	Orleans Arena (2,154); Paradise, NV
01/02/2016; 7:00 pm	at Marist	W 92–83	7–6 (2–1)	McCann Field House (1,200); Poughkeepsie, NY
01/04/2016; 7:00 pm, ESPN3	at Monmouth	L 66–81	7–7 (2–2)	Multipurpose Activity Center (2,731); West Long Branch, NJ
01/07/2016; 7:00 pm, ESPN3	Manhattan	L 86–94	7–8 (2–3)	Koessler Athletic Center (725); Buffalo, NY
01/09/2016; 2:00 pm, ESPN3	Saint Peter's	L 53–70	7–9 (2–4)	Koessler Athletic Center (1,132); Buffalo, NY
01/12/2016*; 7:00 pm	at Dartmouth	L 69–80	7–10	Leede Arena (528); Hanover, NH
01/15/2016; 7:00 pm	at Manhattan	W 65–62	8–10 (3–4)	Draddy Gymnasium (1,029); Riverdale, NY
01/17/2016; 2:00 pm	at Quinnipiac	W 63–53	9–10 (4–4)	TD Bank Sports Center (1,377); Hamden, CT
01/22/2016; 7:00 pm, ESPNU	at Niagara; Battle of the Bridge	W 70–61	10–10 (5–4)	Gallagher Center (2,110); Lewiston, NY
01/24/2016; 2:00 pm, ESPN3	Siena	L 78–99	10–11 (5–5)	Koessler Athletic Center (1,614); Buffalo, NY
01/29/2016; 7:00 pm, ESPN3	at Fairfield	L 77–84	10–12 (5–6)	Webster Bank Arena (1,008); Bridgeport, CT
01/31/2016; 1:00 pm	at Rider	L 68–79	10–13 (5–7)	Alumni Gymnasium (1,631); Lawrenceville, NJ
02/05/2016; 7:00 pm, ESPN3	Iona	L 66–84	10–14 (5–8)	Koessler Athletic Center (1,702); Buffalo, NY
02/07/2016; 3:00 pm, ESPN3	Rider	W 67–61	11–14 (6–8)	Koessler Athletic Center (792); Buffalo, NY
02/11/2016; 7:00 pm, ESPN3	at Siena	L 67–90	11–15 (6–9)	Times Union Center (5,477); Albany, NY
02/14/2016; 3:00 pm	at Saint Peter's	L 57–61	11–16 (6–10)	Yanitelli Center (648); Jersey City, NY
02/18/2016; 8:00 pm, ESPN3	Fairfield	L 71–74	11–17 (6–11)	Koessler Athletic Center (1,137); Buffalo, NY
02/20/2016; 3:00 pm, ESPN3	Marist	W 81–66	12–17 (7–11)	Koessler Athletic Center (1,318); Buffalo, NY
02/25/2016; 8:00 pm, ESPN3	Niagara; Battle of the Bridge	W 65–60	13–17 (8–11)	Koessler Athletic Center (2,023); Buffalo, NY
02/28/2016; 4:00 pm, ESPN3	at Iona	L 78–86	13–18 (8–12)	Hynes Athletic Center (2,079); New Rochelle, NY
MAAC tournament
03/03/2016; 7:00 pm	vs. Niagara; First round	W 102–97 ^{3OT}	14–18	Times Union Center (2,628); Albany, NY
03/04/2016; 9:30 pm, ESPN3	vs. Iona; Quarterfinals	L 55–73	14–19	Times Union Center (1,269); Albany, NY
*Non-conference game. ^{#}Rankings from AP Poll. (#) Tournament seedings in parentheses. All times are in Eastern Time.
