= 2015–16 Quinnipiac Bobcats men's basketball team =

American college basketball season

2015–16 Quinnipiac Bobcats men's basketball
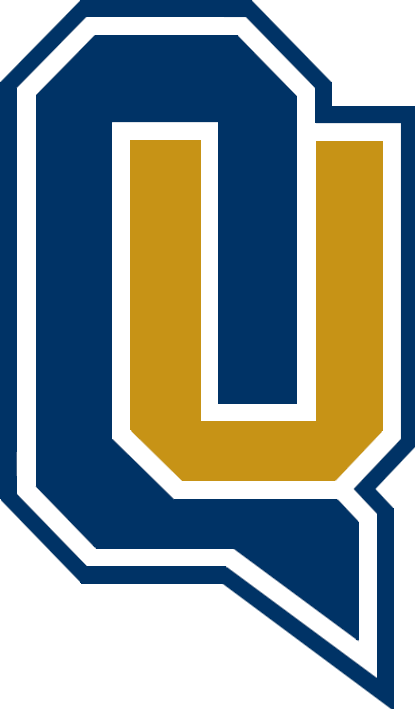
- Conference: Metro Atlantic Athletic Conference
- Record: 9–21 (6–14 MAAC)
- Head coach: Tom Moore (9th season)
- Assistant coaches: Sean Doherty; Eric Eaton; Tony Newsom
- Home arena: TD Bank Sports Center

2015–16 MAAC men's basketball standings
	Conf.				Overall
Team	W		L	PCT	W		L	PCT
Monmouth	17	–	3	.850	28	–	8	.778
Iona †	16	–	4	.800	22	–	11	.667
Siena	13	–	7	.650	21	–	13	.618
Fairfield	12	–	8	.600	19	–	14	.576
Saint Peter's	12	–	8	.600	14	–	16	.467
Manhattan	9	–	11	.450	13	–	18	.419
Canisius	8	–	12	.400	14	–	19	.424
Rider	8	–	12	.400	13	–	20	.394
Quinnipiac	6	–	14	.300	9	–	21	.300
Niagara	5	–	15	.250	7	–	25	.219
Marist	4	–	16	.200	7	–	23	.233
† 2016 MAAC tournament winner

The 2015–16 Quinnipiac Bobcats men's basketball team represented Quinnipiac University during the 2015–16 NCAA Division I men's basketball season. The Bobcats, led by ninth year head coach Tom Moore, played their home games at the TD Bank Sports Center and were members of the Metro Atlantic Athletic Conference. They finished the season 9–21, 6–14 in MAAC play to finish in ninth place. They lost in the first round of the MAAC tournament to Rider.

== Roster ==
2015–16 Quinnipiac Bobcats men's basketball team
Players
Coaches

Pos.	#	Name	Height	Weight	Year	Previous school	Hometown
G	0	Aaron Robinson	6 ft 6 in (1.98 m)	205 lb (93 kg)	Fr	Springbook	Takoma Park, Maryland
F	1	Donovan Smith	6 ft 9 in (2.06 m)	245 lb (111 kg)	Jr	Richards; Triton CC	Chicago, Illinois
G	3	Dimitri Floras	6 ft 1 in (1.85 m)	180 lb (82 kg)	So	Merrimack/MacDuffie School	Nashua, New Hampshire
G	4	Giovanni McLean	6 ft 1 in (1.85 m)	195 lb (88 kg)	Sr	Bronx Regional; Westchester CC	Bronx, NY
G	5	Ayron Hutton	6 ft 3 in (1.91 m)	207 lb (94 kg)	So	Cape Henry	Virginia Beach, Virginia
F	11	Alain Chigha	6 ft 8 in (2.03 m)	207 lb (94 kg)	Jr	Rock School	Yaoundé, Cameroon
F	13	Chaise Daniels	6 ft 9 in (2.06 m)	240 lb (109 kg)	So	Hillhouse/Putnam Science	Meriden, Connecticut
F	14	Andrew Robinson	6 ft 6 in (1.98 m)	210 lb (95 kg)	Fr	Springbook	Takoma Park, Maryland
F	22	Samuel Dingba	6 ft 6 in (1.98 m)	200 lb (91 kg)	So	Salisbury School	Yaoundé, Cameroon
G	23	Daniel Harris	6 ft 3 in (1.91 m)	190 lb (86 kg)	Jr	Sickles; Hillsborough CC	Odessa, Florida
C	24	Will Simonton	6 ft 10 in (2.08 m)	235 lb (107 kg)	Sr	Fishburne; UIC	Vienna, Virginia
G	30	James Ford, Jr.	6 ft 4 in (1.93 m)	203 lb (92 kg)	Sr	Quality Education Academy	Hopewell, Virginia
G	33	Greg Tarca	6 ft 3 in (1.91 m)	195 lb (88 kg)	So	Montgomery	Montgomery, New Jersey
F	34	Abdulai Bundu	6 ft 8 in (2.03 m)	210 lb (95 kg)	Fr	Largo	Upper Marlboro, Maryland

Head coach

- Tom Moore (Boston University)

Assistant coach(es)

- Sean Doherty (Worcester State)
- Eric Eaton (UMass Dartmouth)
- Tony Newsom (Holy Cross)

Legend

- (C) Team captain
- (S) Suspended
- (I) Ineligible
- (W) Walk-on
- Injured
- Current redshirt

Roster
Last update: 2015-11-05

== Schedule ==
Date time, TV	Opponent	Result	Record	Site (attendance) city, state
Regular season
11/13/2015*; 5:30 pm	vs. Sacred Heart; Connecticut 6 Classic	L 64–76	0–1	William H. Detrick Gymnasium; New Britain, CT
11/18/2015*; 7:00 pm	at Vermont	L 70–83	0–2	Patrick Gym (1,861); Burlington, VT
11/22/2015*; 2:00 pm	Holy Cross	W 62–56	1–2	TD Bank Sports Center (1,381); Hamden, CT
11/24/2015*; 7:30 pm	North Carolina Central	W 69–59	2–2	TD Bank Sports Center (713); Hamden, CT
12/01/2015*; 7:00 pm, SNY	Albany	L 54–58	2–3	TD Bank Sports Center (1,377); Hamden, CT
12/04/2015; 7:00 pm	at Niagara	L 72–76	2–4 (0–1)	Gallagher Center (1,204); Lewiston, NY
12/05/2015; 7:00 pm	at Canisius	W 78–76	3–4 (1–1)	Koessler Athletic Center (984); Buffalo, NY
12/09/2015*; 7:00 pm	at Hartford	W 68–66	4–4	Chase Arena at Reich Family Pavilion (1,014); Hartford, CT
12/13/2015*; 2:00 pm	Boston University	L 57–64	4–5	TD Bank Sports Center (1,091); Hamden, CT
12/21/2015*; 9:00 pm, P12N	at Oregon State	L 61–82	4–6	Gill Coliseum (4,455); Corvallis, OR
12/29/2015*; 7:00 pm	at Maine	L 95–98 ^{OT}	4–7	Cross Insurance Center (1,076); Bangor, ME
01/02/2016; 2:00 pm, SNY	Iona	L 66–78	4–8 (1–2)	TD Bank Sports Center (1,612); Hamden, CT
01/04/2016; 7:00 pm	Rider	W 64–60	5–8 (2–2)	TD Bank Sports Center (648); Hamden, CT
01/09/2016; 2:00 pm	at Monmouth	L 74–88	5–9 (2–3)	Multipurpose Activity Center (3,911); West Long Branch, NJ
01/15/2016; 9:00 pm, ESPN3	Siena	L 52–64	5–10 (2–4)	TD Bank Sports Center (1,428); Hamden, CT
01/17/2016; 2:00 pm	Canisius	L 53–63	5–11 (2–5)	TD Bank Sports Center (1,377); Hamden, CT
01/24/2016; 4:00 pm	at Rider	L 52–75	5–12 (2–6)	Alumni Gymnasium (1,024); Lawrenceville, NJ
01/28/2016; 7:30 pm	Monmouth	L 51–66	5–13 (2–7)	TD Bank Sports Center (2,612); Hamden, CT
01/30/2016; 2:00 pm	Niagara	W 82–68	6–13 (3–7)	TD Bank Sports Center (1,451); Hamden, CT
02/01/2016; 7:00 pm, SNY	at Fairfield	W 64–59	7–13 (4–7)	Webster Bank Arena; Bridgeport, CT
02/04/2016; 7:00 pm, ESPN3	Marist	W 79–53	8–13 (5–7)	TD Bank Sports Center (1,358); Hamden, CT
02/08/2016; 7:00 pm	at Saint Peter's	L 52–68	8–14 (5–8)	Yanitelli Center; Jersey City, NY
02/11/2016; 8:00 pm, ESPN3	at Manhattan	L 77–84	8–15 (5–9)	Draddy Gymnasium (1,004); Riverdale, NY
02/13/2016; 2:00 pm, SNY	Fairfield	L 80–84 ^{2OT}	8–16 (5–10)	TD Bank Sports Center (2,034); Hamden, CT
02/15/2016; 7:00 pm	at Iona	L 59–78	8–17 (5–11)	Hynes Athletic Center (1,421); New Rochelle, NY
02/18/2016; 8:00 pm, ESPN3	Saint Peter's	W 56–55	9–17 (6–11)	TD Bank Sports Center (1,075); Hamden, CT
02/21/2016; 2:00 pm	Manhattan	L 59–63	9–18 (6–12)	TD Bank Sports Center (2,466); Hamden, CT
02/26/2016; 7:00 pm, ESPN3	at Marist	L 77–91	9–19 (6–13)	McCann Field House (1,275); Poughkeepsie, NY
02/28/2016; 2:00 pm	at Siena	L 65–80	9–20 (6–14)	Times Union Center (7,636); Albany, NY
MAAC tournament
03/03/2016; 5:00 pm	vs. Rider; First round	L 57–60	9–21	Times Union Center (2,628); Albany, NY
*Non-conference game. ^{#}Rankings from AP Poll. (#) Tournament seedings in parentheses. All times are in Eastern Time.
