= 2015–16 Saint Peter's Peacocks men's basketball team =

American college basketball season

2015–16 Saint Peter's Peacocks men's basketball
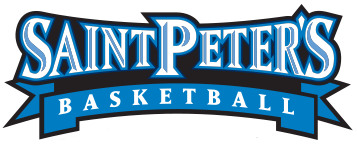
- Conference: Metro Atlantic Athletic Conference
- Record: 14–16 (12–8 MAAC)
- Head coach: John Dunne (10th season)
- Assistant coaches: Matt Henry; Serge Clement; Alex Stone
- Home arena: Yanitelli Center

2015–16 MAAC men's basketball standings
	Conf.				Overall
Team	W		L	PCT	W		L	PCT
Monmouth	17	–	3	.850	28	–	8	.778
Iona †	16	–	4	.800	22	–	11	.667
Siena	13	–	7	.650	21	–	13	.618
Fairfield	12	–	8	.600	19	–	14	.576
Saint Peter's	12	–	8	.600	14	–	16	.467
Manhattan	9	–	11	.450	13	–	18	.419
Canisius	8	–	12	.400	14	–	19	.424
Rider	8	–	12	.400	13	–	20	.394
Quinnipiac	6	–	14	.300	9	–	21	.300
Niagara	5	–	15	.250	7	–	25	.219
Marist	4	–	16	.200	7	–	23	.233
† 2016 MAAC tournament winner

The 2015–16 Saint Peter's Peacocks men's basketball team represented Saint Peter's University during the 2015–16 NCAA Division I men's basketball season. The Peacocks, led by ninth year head coach John Dunne, played their home games at the Yanitelli Center and were members of the Metro Atlantic Athletic Conference. They finished the season 14–16, 12–8 in MAAC play to finish in a tie for fourth place. They lost in the quarterfinals of the MAAC tournament to Fairfield.

== Roster ==
Number	Name	Position	Height	Weight	Year	Hometown
0	Nick Griffin	Guard	6–2	173	Junior	Rockville, Maryland
1	Cavon Baker	Guard	6–1	175	Senior	Queens, New York
3	Trevis Wyche	Guard	6–1	176	Junior	Neptune, New Jersey
5	Elisha Boone	Guard	6–3	190	Sophomore	Laurelton, New York
10	Elias Desport	Forward	6–8	230	Senior	Stockholm, Sweden
11	Nnamdi Enechionyia	Guard/Forward	6–6	175	Junior	Springfield, Virginia
13	Antwon Porley	Guard	6–3	165	Freshman	Lancaster, Texas
15	Mamadou Ndaiye	Forward	6–7	210	Freshman	Laurel, Maryland
20	Chazz Patterson	Guard	6–3	168	Junior	Browns Mills, New Jersey
23	Samuel Idowu	Forward	6–7	219	Freshman	Brooklyn, New York
25	Cameron Jones	FGuard	6–3	210	Freshman	Fairless Hills, Pennsylvania
33	Rodney Hawkins	Forward	6–7	189	Sophomore	Baltimore, Maryland
35	Quadir Welton	Forward/Center	6–8	251	Junior	Philadelphia, Pennsylvania

== Schedule ==
Date time, TV	Rank^{#}	Opponent^{#}	Result	Record	Site (attendance) city, state
Regular season
11/13/2015*; 8:30 pm		Brown	W 77–65	1–0	Yanitelli Center (720); Jersey City, NJ
11/15/2015*; 2:00 pm		at Lafayette	L 86–87 ^{OT}	1–1	Kirby Sports Center (1,450); Easton, PA
11/19/2015*; 7:00 pm		Hartford	L 66–67	1–2	Yanitelli Center (652); Jersey City, NJ
11/21/2015*; 9:00 pm		at Princeton	L 72–75	1–3	Jadwin Gymnasium (1,306); Princeton, NJ
11/28/2015*; 2:00 pm		at Fairleigh Dickinson	L 62–77	1–4	Rothman Center (692); Hackensack, NJ
12/02/2015; 7:00 pm		at Rider	W 73–61	2–4 (1–0)	Alumni Gymnasium (1,502); Lawrenceville, NJ
12/06/2015; 2:00 pm		Siena	W 72–68	3–4 (2–0)	Yanitelli Center (338); Jersey City, NJ
12/13/2015*; 2:30 pm, FS1		at Seton Hall	L 46–72	3–5	Prudential Center (6,443); Newark, NJ
12/19/2015*; 1:00 pm		at No. 21 George Washington	L 74–87	3–6	Charles E. Smith Center (2,880); Washington, D.C.
12/23/2015*; 4:00 pm		St. Francis Brooklyn	W 56–45	4–6	Yanitelli Center (131); Jersey City, NJ
12/28/2015*; 7:00 pm		Cornell	L 62–65	4–7	Yanitelli Center (611); Jersey City, NJ
01/04/2016; 7:00 pm		at Marist	W 68–60	5–7 (3–0)	McCann Field House (809); Poughkeepsie, NY
01/07/2016; 7:00 pm		at Niagara	L 61–63	5–8 (3–1)	Gallagher Center (851); Lewiston, NY
01/09/2016; 2:00 pm, ESPN3		at Canisius	W 70–53	6–8 (4–1)	Koessler Athletic Center (1,132); Buffalo, NY
01/17/2015; 2:00 pm		Marist	W 76–67	7–8 (5–1)	Yanitelli Center (321); Jersey City, NJ
01/19/2016; 7:00 pm		at Fairfield	W 77–71	8–8 (6–1)	Webster Bank Arena (2,113); Bridgeport, CT
01/22/2016; 7:00 pm		at Iona	L 58–64	8–9 (6–2)	Hynes Athletic Center (1,250); New Rochelle, NY
01/28/2015; 8:00 pm, ESPN3		Rider	L 45–76	8–10 (6–3)	Yanitelli Center (568); Jersey City, NJ
01/30/2016; 7:00 pm, ESPN3		at Monmouth	L 57–73	8–11 (6–4)	Multipurpose Activity Center; West Long Branch, NJ
02/01/2015; 9:00 pm		Iona	L 67–75	8–12 (6–5)	Yanitelli Center (389); Jersey City, NJ
02/05/2016; 9:00 pm, ESPNU		at Siena	L 52–69	8–13 (6–6)	Times Union Center (6,295); Albany, NY
02/08/2015; 7:00 pm		Quinnipiac	W 68–52	9–13 (7–6)	Yanitelli Center; Jersey City, NJ
02/12/2015; 7:00 pm, ESPN3		Niagara	W 72–59	10–13 (8–6)	Yanitelli Center (346); Jersey City, NJ
02/14/2015; 3:00 pm		Canisius	W 61–57	11–13 (9–6)	Yanitelli Center (348); Jersey City, NJ
02/17/2015; 7:00 pm		Manhattan; Postponed from 1/25/16	W 70–69	12–13 (10–6)	Yanitelli Center (473); Jersey City, NJ
02/18/2015; 8:00 pm, ESPN3		at Quinnipiac	L 55–56	12–14 (10–7)	TD Bank Sports Center (1,075); Hamden, CT
02/21/2015; 2:00 pm		Monmouth	L 75–82	12–15 (10–8)	Yanitelli Center (1,013); Jersey City, NJ
02/23/2016; 7:00 pm		at Manhattan	W 61–40	13–15 (11–8)	Draddy Gymnasium (1,122); Riverdale, NY
02/27/2015; 2:00 pm		Fairfield	W 72–68	14–15 (12–8)	Yanitelli Center (531); Jersey City, NJ
MAAC tournament
03/05/2016; 9:30 pm, ESPN3		vs. Fairfield; Quarterfinals	L 55–64	14–16	Times Union Center (6,987); Albany, NY
*Non-conference game. ^{#}Rankings from AP Poll. (#) Tournament seedings in parentheses. All times are in Eastern Time.
