= 2015–16 Manhattan Jaspers basketball team =

American college basketball season

2015–16 Manhattan Jaspers basketball
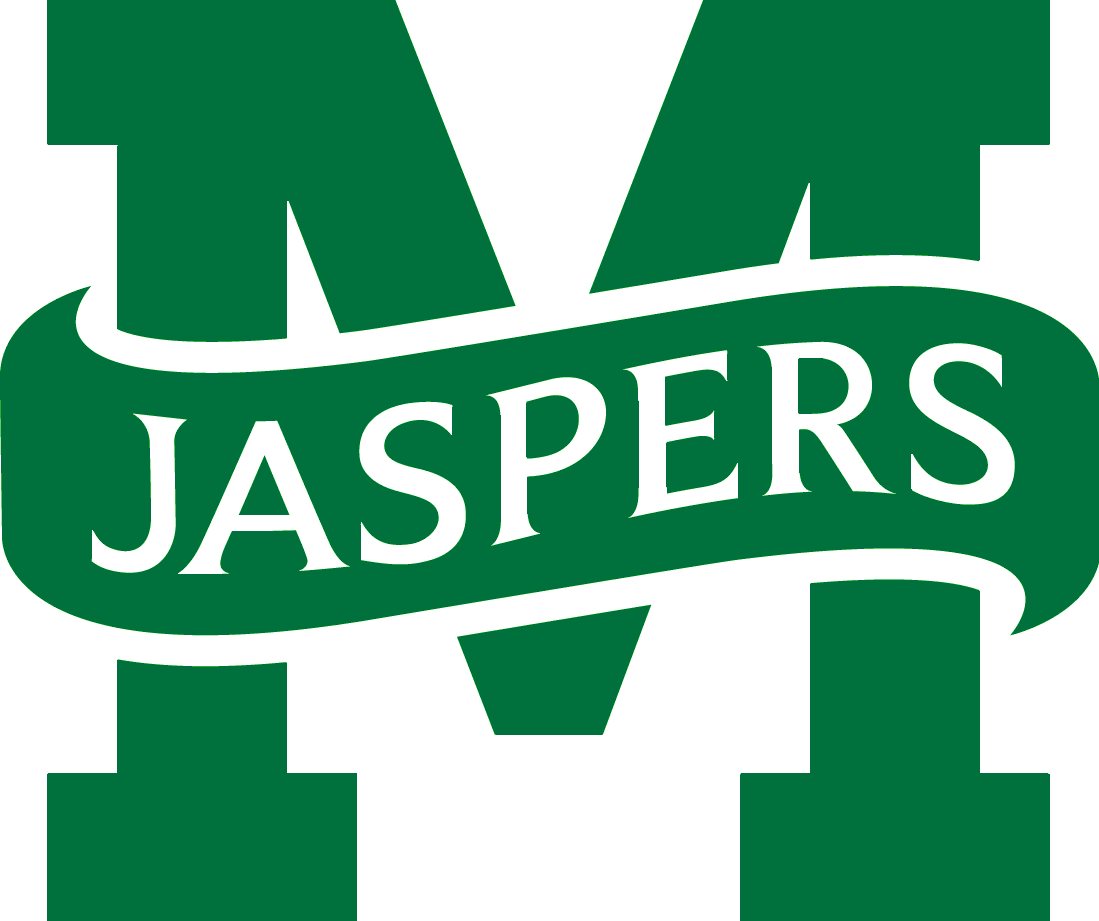
- Conference: Metro Atlantic Athletic Conference
- Record: 13–18 (9–11 MAAC)
- Head coach: Steve Masiello (5th season)
- Assistant coaches: Matt Grady; Mike Bramucci; Branden McDonald
- Home arena: Draddy Gymnasium

2015–16 MAAC men's basketball standings
	Conf.				Overall
Team	W		L	PCT	W		L	PCT
Monmouth	17	–	3	.850	28	–	8	.778
Iona †	16	–	4	.800	22	–	11	.667
Siena	13	–	7	.650	21	–	13	.618
Fairfield	12	–	8	.600	19	–	14	.576
Saint Peter's	12	–	8	.600	14	–	16	.467
Manhattan	9	–	11	.450	13	–	18	.419
Canisius	8	–	12	.400	14	–	19	.424
Rider	8	–	12	.400	13	–	20	.394
Quinnipiac	6	–	14	.300	9	–	21	.300
Niagara	5	–	15	.250	7	–	25	.219
Marist	4	–	16	.200	7	–	23	.233
† 2016 MAAC tournament winner

The 2015–16 Manhattan Jaspers basketball team represented Manhattan College during the 2015–16 NCAA Division I men's basketball season. The Jaspers, led by fifth year head coach Steve Masiello, played their home games at Draddy Gymnasium and were members of the Metro Atlantic Athletic Conference. They finished the season 13–18, 9–11 in MAAC play to finish in sixth place. They defeated Marist in the first round of the MAAC tournament to advance to the quarterfinals where they lost to Siena.

== Roster ==
2015–16 Manhattan Jaspers men's basketball team
#	Name	Position	Height	Weight	Year	Hometown
0	Shane Richards	Forward	6–5	185	Sr	New York City
1	Zavier Turner	Guard	5–9	170	RSJr	Indianapolis
2	Ak Ojo	Center	6–10	220	Fr	Lagos, Nigeria
3	Samson Usilo	Guard	6–4	205	So	Lagos, Nigeria
4	Zane Waterman	Forward	6–9	220	So	Fayetteville, North Carolina
5	Tyler Wilson	Guard	6–0	175	Jr	The Bronx, New York
12	RaShawn Stores	Guard	5–10	190	Sr	The Bronx, New York
14	Calvin Crawford	Forward	6–8	205	So	Middletown, New York
15	Samson Akilo	Forward	6–8	210	So	Lagos, Nigeria
20	Jermaine Lawrence	Forward	6–10	210	Jr	Queens, New York
21	Matt Maloney	Guard	6–1	170	Fr	Somers, New York
22	Thomas Capuano	Guard	5–11	180	Fr	Hastings-on-Hudson, New York
23	Rich Williams	Guard	6–5	190	Jr	Brooklyn, New York
32	Carlton Allen	Center	6–10	240	Jr	Ewing, New Jersey
33	Jason Camus	Guard	5–10	160	Fr	Middle Village, New York

== Schedule ==
Date time, TV	Rank^{#}	Opponent^{#}	Result	Record	Site (attendance) city, state
Exhibition
11/09/2015*; 7:00 pm		Bridgeport	L 86–89		Draddy Gymnasium; Riverdale, New York
Regular season
11/16/2015*; 10:00 pm		at Saint Mary's	L 63–89	0–1	McKeon Pavilion (2,242); Moraga, California
11/21/2015*; 7:00 pm		Bucknell	L 67–80	0–2	Draddy Gymnasium (1,810); Riverdale, New York
11/25/2015*; 7:00 pm		George Mason	W 69–67	1–2	Draddy Gymnasium (790); Riverdale, New York
11/28/2015*; 5:00 pm		at Fordham; Battle of the Bronx	L 64–87	1–3	Rose Hill Gymnasium (2,747); Bronx, New York
12/04/2015; 7:00 pm, TWCSC		at Siena	L 54–89	1–4 (0–1)	Times Union Center (5,727); Albany, New York
12/06/2015; 2:00 pm		Marist	L 70–75	1–5 (0–2)	Draddy Gymnasium (811); Riverdale, New York
12/09/2015*; 7:00 pm		Columbia	L 71–72	1–6	Draddy Gymnasium (714); Riverdale, New York
12/12/2015*; 8:00 pm, ESPN3		at Memphis	L 57–89	1–7	FedExForum (11,458); Memphis, Tennessee
12/14/2015*; 7:00 pm		St. Francis Brooklyn	W 71–60	2–7	Draddy Gymnasium (614); Riverdale, New York
12/20/2015*; 1:00 pm		at Morgan State	W 78–66	3–7	Talmadge L. Hill Field House (126); Baltimore
12/29/2015*; 2:00 pm		at Eastern Kentucky	L 64–76	3–8	McBrayer Arena (1,150); Richmond, Kentucky
01/02/2016; 7:00 pm		Fairfield	W 72–66	4–8 (1–2)	Draddy Gymnasium (1,620); Riverdale, New York
01/04/2016; 7:00 pm, ESPN3		Siena	W 92–87 ^{3OT}	5–8 (2–2)	Draddy Gymnasium (1,308); Riverdale, New York
01/07/2016; 7:00 pm, ESPN3		at Canisius	W 94–86	6–8 (3–2)	Koessler Athletic Center (725); Buffalo, New York
01/09/2016; 3:00 pm		at Niagara	L 53–55	6–9 (3–3)	Gallagher Center (1,021); Lewiston, New York
01/15/2016; 7:00 pm		Canisius	L 62–65	6–10 (3–4)	Draddy Gymnasium (1,029); Riverdale, New York
01/17/2016; 2:00 pm		Niagara	W 69–64	7–10 (4–4)	Draddy Gymnasium (1,492); Riverdale, New York
01/21/2016; 8:00 pm, ESPN3		Monmouth	W 78–71	8–10 (5–4)	Draddy Gymnasium (1,898); Riverdale, New York
01/29/2016; 7:00 pm, ESPNU		at Iona	L 56–70	8–11 (5–5)	Hynes Athletic Center (2,611); New Rochelle, New York
02/02/2016; 7:00 pm		Rider	W 65–57	9–11 (6–5)	Draddy Gymnasium (983); Riverdale, New York
02/07/2016; 3:30 pm		at Fairfield	L 70–80	9–12 (6–6)	Webster Bank Arena; Bridgeport, Connecticut
02/11/2016; 8:00 pm, ESPN3		Quinnipiac	W 84–77	10–12 (7–6)	Draddy Gymnasium (1,004); Riverdale, New York
02/13/2016; 7:00 pm		at Marist	W 81–73	11–12 (8–6)	McCann Field House (1,477); Poughkeepsie, New York
02/15/2016; 7:00 pm, ESPN3		at Monmouth	L 70–79	11–13 (8–7)	Multipurpose Activity Center (3,040); West Long Branch, New Jersey
02/17/2016; 7:00 pm, ESPN3		at Saint Peter's; Postponed from 1/25/16	L 69–70	11–14 (8–8)	Yanitelli Center (473); Jersey City, New Jersey
02/21/2016; 2:00 pm		at Quinnipiac	W 63–59	12–14 (9–8)	TD Bank Sports Center (2,466); Hamden, Connecticut
02/23/2016; 7:00 pm, ESPN3		Saint Peter's	L 40–61	12–15 (9–9)	Draddy Gymnasium (1,122); Riverdale, New York
02/26/2016; 7:00 pm, ESPNU		Iona	L 73–86	12–16 (9–10)	Draddy Gymnasium (2,520); Riverdale, New York
02/28/2016; 6:00 pm, ESPN3		at Rider	L 57–60	12–17 (9–11)	Alumni Gymnasium (1,604); Lawrenceville, New Jersey
MAAC tournament
03/03/2016; 9:00 pm		vs. Marist; First round	W 81–63	13–17	Times Union Center (2,628); Albany, New York
03/05/2016; 7:00 pm, ESPN3		Siena; Quarterfinals	L 76–89	13–18	Times Union Center (6,978); Albany, New York
*Non-conference game. ^{#}Rankings from AP Poll. (#) Tournament seedings in parentheses. All times are in Eastern Time.
