= 2015–16 Fairfield Stags men's basketball team =

American college basketball season

2015–16 Fairfield Stags men's basketball
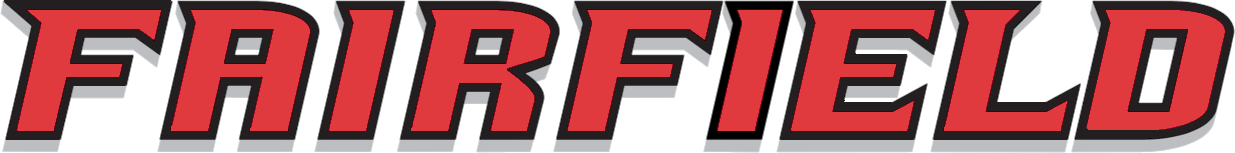

CIT, First round
- Conference: Metro Atlantic Athletic Conference
- Record: 19–14 (12–8 MAAC)
- Head coach: Sydney Johnson (5th season)
- Assistant coaches: Mitch Buonaguro; Tom Parrotta; Tyson Wheeler
- Home arena: Webster Bank Arena

2015–16 MAAC men's basketball standings
	Conf.				Overall
Team	W		L	PCT	W		L	PCT
Monmouth	17	–	3	.850	28	–	8	.778
Iona †	16	–	4	.800	22	–	11	.667
Siena	13	–	7	.650	21	–	13	.618
Fairfield	12	–	8	.600	19	–	14	.576
Saint Peter's	12	–	8	.600	14	–	16	.467
Manhattan	9	–	11	.450	13	–	18	.419
Canisius	8	–	12	.400	14	–	19	.424
Rider	8	–	12	.400	13	–	20	.394
Quinnipiac	6	–	14	.300	9	–	21	.300
Niagara	5	–	15	.250	7	–	25	.219
Marist	4	–	16	.200	7	–	23	.233
† 2016 MAAC tournament winner

The 2015–16 Fairfield Stags men's basketball team represented Fairfield University during the 2015–16 NCAA Division I men's basketball season. The Stags, led by fifth year head coach Sydney Johnson, played their home games at Webster Bank Arena and were members of the Metro Atlantic Athletic Conference. They finished the season 19–14, 12–8 in MAAC play to finish in a tie for fourth place. They defeated Saint Peter's in the quarterfinals of the MAAC tournament to advance to the semifinals where they lost to Monmouth. They were invited to the CollegeInsider.com Tournament where they lost in the first round to New Hampshire.

== Roster ==
Number	Name	Position	Height	Weight	Year	Hometown
0	Mike Kirkland, Jr.	Forward	6–7	215	Senior	Ocala, Florida
1	Jerome Segura	Guard	5–11	175	Sophomore	Houston, Texas
2	Jerry Johnson, Jr.	Guard	6–2	210	Freshman	Memphis, Tennessee
3	Tyler Nelson	Guard	6–3	170	Sophomore	Bradford, Massachusetts
4	Jared Harper	Guard	6–1	175	Sophomore	Beverly Hills, California
5	Scott King, Jr.	Forward	6–9	220	Senior	Derry, New Hampshire
10	Thomas Nolan	Forward	6–3	180	Freshman	Fairfield, Connecticut
13	Jonathan Kasibabu	Forward	6–8	240	Freshman	Kinshasa, Democratic Republic of the Congo
14	Marcus Gilbert	Forward	6–6	185	Senior	Smyrna, Delaware
15	Matt Hill	Forward/Center	6–8	215	Sophomore	Glastonbury, Connecticut
21	Amadou Sidibe	Forward	6–8	215	Senior	The Bronx, New York
25	Steve Smith	Forward	6–7	190	Junior	Gwynedd Valley, Pennsylvania
30	Andrew Leone	Guard	5–6	160	Junior	New York City, New York
33	Curtis Cobb	Guard	6–4	175	Freshman	Fall River, Massachusetts
34	Matija Milin	Forward	6–9	220	Freshman	Belgrade, Serbia
35	Coleman Johnson	Forward	6–6	215	Senior	Oak Hill, Virginia
40	Kevin Degnan	Forward/Center	6–6	215	Freshman	Pearl River, New York

== Schedule ==
Date time, TV	Opponent	Result	Record	Site (attendance) city, state
Exhibition
11/06/2015*; 7:00 pm	Bridgeport	W 91–80		Webster Bank Arena (1,501); Bridgeport, CT
Regular season
11/13/2015*; 3:00 pm	vs. Yale; Connecticut 6 Classic	L 57–70	0–1	William H. Detrick Gymnasium; New Britain, CT
11/15/2015*; 8:00 pm, ESPNU	at No. 1 North Carolina; CBE Hall of Fame Classic	L 65–92	0–2	Dean Smith Center (13,178); Chapel Hill, NC
11/18/2015*; 8:00 pm	at Northwestern; CBE Hall of Fame Classic	L 72–79	0–3	Welsh-Ryan Arena (5,574); Evanston, IL
11/21/2015*; 7:00 pm	Sacred Heart	W 83–79 ^{OT}	1–3	Webster Bank Arena (3,251); Bridgeport, CT
11/24/2015*; 7:30 pm	at Maryland Eastern Shore; CBE Hall of Fame Classic	W 113–74	2–3	Hytche Athletic Center (846); Princess Anne, MD
11/27/2015*; 5:00 pm	Columbia	W 82–81 ^{OT}	3–3	Webster Bank Arena (1,887); Bridgeport, CT
12/01/2015; 7:00 pm	at Iona	L 77–101	3–4 (0–1)	Hynes Athletic Center (1,621); New Rochelle, NY
12/04/2015; 7:00 pm	Rider	W 74–70	4–4 (1–1)	Webster Bank Arena (867); Bridgeport, CT
12/18/2015*; 7:00 pm	Wagner	L 64–76	4–5	Webster Bank Arena (843); Bridgeport, CT
12/22/2015*; 7:00 pm	Loyola (MD)	W 94–88	5–5	Webster Bank Arena (826); Bridgeport, CT
12/27/2015*; 2:00 pm	at Bucknell	W 101–91	6–5	Sojka Pavilion (2,313); Lewisburg, PA
01/02/2016; 7:00 pm	at Manhattan	L 66–72	6–6 (1–2)	Draddy Gymnasium (1,620); Riverdale, NY
01/04/2016*; 7:00 pm	Dartmouth	W 97–85	7–6	Webster Bank Arena (878); Bridgeport, CT
01/07/2016; 7:00 pm, TWCSC	at Siena	L 76–91	7–7 (1–3)	Times Union Center (5,193); Albany, NY
01/09/2016; 7:00 pm	at Rider	W 69–64	8–7 (2–3)	Alumni Gymnasium (1,409); Lawrenceville, NJ
01/11/2016; 7:00 pm, SNY	Monmouth	L 74–86	8–8 (2–4)	Webster Bank Arena (1,237); Bridgeport, CT
01/15/2016; 7:00 pm	Niagara	W 73–68	9–8 (3–4)	Webster Bank Arena (1,014); Bridgeport, CT
01/19/2016; 7:00 pm	Saint Peter's	L 71–77	9–9 (3–5)	Webster Bank Arena (2,113); Bridgeport, CT
01/22/2016; 7:00 pm, ESPN3	at Marist	W 88–76	10–9 (4–5)	McCann Field House (1,338); Poughkeepsie, NY
01/24/2016; 3:30 pm, SNY	Iona	W 98–91	11–9 (5–5)	Webster Bank Arena (1,278); Bridgeport, CT
01/29/2016; 7:00 pm, ESPN3	Canisius	W 84–77	12–9 (6–5)	Webster Bank Arena (1,008); Bridgeport, CT
02/01/2016; 7:00 pm, SNY	Quinnipiac	L 59–64	12–10 (6–6)	Webster Bank Arena; Bridgeport, CT
02/05/2016; 7:00 pm, ESPN3	at Monmouth	L 67–91	12–11 (6–7)	Multipurpose Activity Center (3,785); West Long Branch, NJ
02/07/2016; 3:30 pm	Manhattan	W 80–70	13–11 (7–7)	Webster Bank Arena; Bridgeport, CT
02/13/2016; 2:00 pm	at Quinnipiac	W 84–80 ^{2OT}	14–11 (8–7)	TD Bank Sports Center (2,034); Hamden, CT
02/15/2016; 7:00 pm, SNY	Marist	W 76–73	15–11 (9–7)	Webster Bank Arena (956); Bridgeport, CT
02/18/2016; 8:00 pm, ESPN3	at Canisius	W 74–71	16–11 (10–7)	Koessler Athletic Center (1,137); Buffalo, NY
02/20/2016; 3:00 pm	at Niagara	W 71–59	17–11 (11–7)	Gallagher Center (1,270); Lewiston, NY
02/24/2016; 7:00 pm	Siena	W 76–69	18–11 (12–7)	Webster Bank Arena (1,785); Bridgeport, CT
02/27/2016; 3:00 pm	at Saint Peter's	L 68–72	18–12 (12–8)	Yanitelli Center (531); Jersey City, NY
MAAC tournament
03/05/2016; 9:30 pm, ESPN3	vs. Saint Peter's; Quarterfinals	W 64–55	19–12	Times Union Center (6,987); Albany, NY
03/06/2016; 4:30 pm, ESPN3	vs. Monmouth; Semifinals	L 63–76	19–13	Times Union Center (5,722); Albany, NY
CIT
03/16/2016*; 7:00 pm	New Hampshire; First round	L 62–77	19–14	Webster Bank Arena (2,479); Bridgeport, CT
*Non-conference game. ^{#}Rankings from AP Poll. (#) Tournament seedings in parentheses. All times are in Eastern Time.
