= 2015–16 Rider Broncs men's basketball team =

American college basketball season

2015–16 Rider Broncs men's basketball
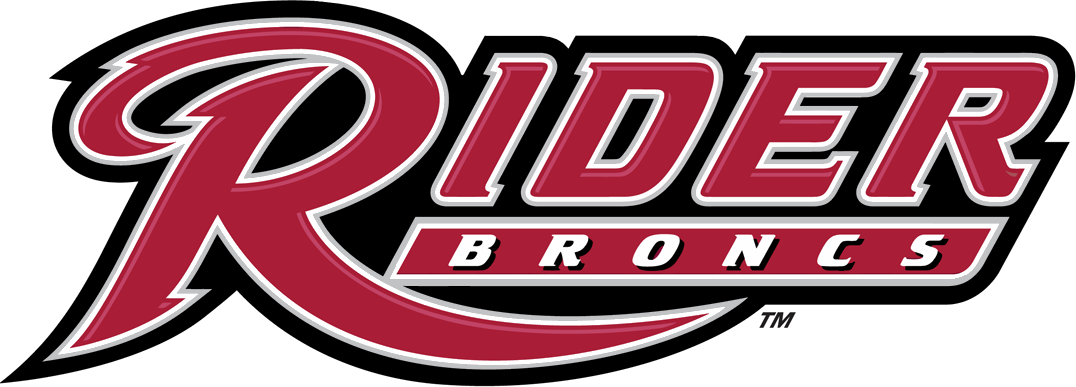
- Conference: Metro Atlantic Athletic Conference
- Record: 13–20 (8–12 MAAC)
- Head coach: Kevin Baggett (4th season)
- Assistant coaches: Mike Witcoskie; Dino Presley; Marlon Guild
- Home arena: Alumni Gymnasium

2015–16 MAAC men's basketball standings
	Conf.				Overall
Team	W		L	PCT	W		L	PCT
Monmouth	17	–	3	.850	28	–	8	.778
Iona †	16	–	4	.800	22	–	11	.667
Siena	13	–	7	.650	21	–	13	.618
Fairfield	12	–	8	.600	19	–	14	.576
Saint Peter's	12	–	8	.600	14	–	16	.467
Manhattan	9	–	11	.450	13	–	18	.419
Canisius	8	–	12	.400	14	–	19	.424
Rider	8	–	12	.400	13	–	20	.394
Quinnipiac	6	–	14	.300	9	–	21	.300
Niagara	5	–	15	.250	7	–	25	.219
Marist	4	–	16	.200	7	–	23	.233
† 2016 MAAC tournament winner

The 2015–16 Rider Broncs men's basketball team represented Rider University during the 2015–16 NCAA Division I men's basketball season. The Broncs, led by fourth year head coach Kevin Baggett, played their home games at Alumni Gymnasium and were members of the Metro Atlantic Athletic Conference. They finished the season 13–20, 8–12 in MAAC play to finish in a tie for seventh place. They defeated Quinnipiac in the first round of the MAAC tournament to advance to the quarterfinals where they lost to Monmouth.

== Roster ==
Number	Name	Position	Height	Weight	Year	Hometown
0	Kahlil Thomas	Forward	6–7	225	Junior	Parkway, Florida
2	Zedric Sadler	Guard	6–3	195	Senior	Detroit, Michigan
3	Jimmie Taylor	Guard	6–4	200	Junior	Branford, Florida
5	Teddy Okereafor	Guard	6–4	195	RS Senior	London, England
10	Kealen Ives	Guard	5–9	165	Freshman	Providence, Rhode Island
11	Xavier Lundy	Forward	6–7	225	Junior	Paulsboro, New Jersey
12	Anthony Durham	Guard	6–3	195	Sophomore	Philadelphia, Pennsylvania
14	Shawn Valentine	Forward	6–7	205	Senior	Sicklerville, New Jersey
15	Khalil Alford	Guard	6–5	210	Senior	Raleigh, North Carolina
22	Josh Williams	Guard/Forward	6–6	195	Freshman	Trenton, New Jersey
24	Gemil Holbrook	Guard	6–4	205	Freshman	Philadelphia, Pennsylvania
25	Lacey James	Forward	6–9	220	Freshman	Grand Rapids, Michigan
32	Kenny Grant	Forward	6–9	240	Sophomore	East Orange, New Jersey

== Schedule ==
Date time, TV	Opponent	Result	Record	Site (attendance) city, state
Exhibition
11/07/2015*; 4:00 pm	USciences	W 65–44		Alumni Gymnasium (1,607); Lawrenceville, NJ
Regular season
11/13/2015*; 7:00 pm	Princeton	L 56–64	0–1	Alumni Gymnasium (1,650); Lawrenceville, NJ
11/17/2015*; 7:00 pm	at La Salle	L 60–73	0–2	Tom Gola Arena (1,611); Philadelphia, PA
11/20/2015*; 7:00 pm, BTN	at No. 3 Maryland; Cancún Challenge	L 58–65	0–3	Xfinity Center (17,950); College Park, MD
11/24/2015*; 12:30 pm	vs. Cleveland State; Cancún Challenge	L 52–57	0–4	Hard Rock Hotel Riviera Maya (982); Cancún, MX
11/25/2015*; 12:30 pm	vs. Houston Baptist; Cancún Challenge	W 67–56	1–4	Hard Rock Hotel Riviera Maya (982); Cancún, MX
11/29/2015*; 2:00 pm	at Rhode Island; Cancún Challenge	L 57–82	1–5	Ryan Center (3,320); Kingston, RI
12/02/2015; 7:00 pm	Saint Peter's	L 61–73	1–6 (0–1)	Alumni Gymnasium (1,502); Lawrenceville, NJ
12/04/2015; 7:00 pm	at Fairfield	L 70–74	1–7 (0–2)	Webster Bank Arena; Bridgeport, CT
12/08/2015*; 7:00 pm	Wagner	L 64–65	1–8	Alumni Gymnasium (1,508); Lawrenceville, NJ
12/12/2015*; 5:30 pm	at Charleston Southern	W 82–72	2–8	CSU Field House (512); North Charleston, SC
12/19/2015*; 8:00 pm, FSN	at No. 14 Providence	W 73–65	2–9	Dunkin' Donuts Center (7,852); Providence, RI
12/23/2015*; 7:00 pm	at Morgan State	W 71–49	3–9	Talmadge L. Hill Field House (129); Baltimore, MD
12/30/2015*; 7:00 pm	Hartford	W 82–80 ^{2OT}	4–9	Alumni Gymnasium (1,520); Lawrenceville, NJ
01/04/2016; 7:00 pm	at Quinnipiac	L 60–64	4–10 (0–3)	TD Bank Sports Center (648); Hamden, CT
01/07/2016; 8:00 pm, ESPN3	at Iona	L 58–67	4–11 (0–4)	Hynes Athletic Center (1,277); New Rochelle, NY
01/09/2016; 7:00 pm	Fairfield	L 64–69	4–12 (0–5)	Alumni Gymnasium (1,409); Lawrenceville, NJ
01/14/2016; 8:00 pm, ESPN3	Marist	W 102–100 ^{2OT}	5–12 (1–5)	Alumni Gymnasium; Lawrenceville, NJ
01/17/2016; 4:00 pm, ESPN3	Iona	W 79–75	6–12 (2–5)	Alumni Gymnasium (1,517); Lawrenceville, NJ
01/21/2016; 7:00 pm	at Siena	L 52–63	6–13 (2–6)	Times Union Center (5,449); Albany, NY
01/24/2016; 4:00 pm	Quinnipiac	W 75–52	7–13 (3–6)	Alumni Gymnasium (1,024); Lawrenceville, NJ
01/28/2016; 8:00 pm, ESPN3	at Saint Peter's	W 76–45	8–13 (4–6)	Yanitelli Center (568); Jersey City, NY
01/31/2016; 1:00 pm	Canisius	W 89–68	9–13 (5–6)	Alumni Gymnasium (1,631); Lawrenceville, NJ
02/02/2016; 7:00 pm	at Manhattan	L 57–65	9–14 (5–7)	Draddy Gymnasium (983); Riverdale, NY
02/05/2016; 7:00 pm	at Niagara	W 66–60	10–14 (6–7)	Gallagher Center (1,257); Lewiston, NY
02/07/2016; 3:00 pm	at Canisius	L 61–67	10–15 (6–8)	Koessler Athletic Center (792); Buffalo, NY
02/12/2016; 7:00 pm, ESPNU	Monmouth	L 78–79	10–16 (6–9)	Alumni Gymnasium (1,650); Lawrenceville, NJ
02/14/2016; 2:00 pm	Niagara	W 77–59	11–16 (7–9)	Alumni Gymnasium (1,414); Lawrenceville, NJ
02/19/2016; 7:00 pm, ESPN3	Siena	L 64–84	11–17 (7–10)	Alumni Gymnasium (1,650); Lawrenceville, NJ
02/23/2016; 7:00 pm	at Marist	L 58–71	11–18 (7–11)	McCann Field House (1,001); Poughkeepsie, NY
02/26/2016; 7:00 pm, ESPN2	at Monmouth	L 58–79	11–19 (7–12)	Multipurpose Activity Center (4,194); West Long Branch, NJ
02/28/2016; 6:00 pm, ESPN3	Manhattan	W 60–57	12–19 (8–12)	Alumni Gymnasium (1,604); Lawrenceville, NJ
MAAC tournament
03/03/2016; 5:00 pm	vs. Quinnipiac; First round	W 60–57	13–19	Times Union Center (2,628); Albany, NY
03/04/2016; 7:00 pm, ESPN3	vs. Monmouth; Quarterfinals	L 48–59	13–20	Times Union Center (1,269); Albany, NY
*Non-conference game. ^{#}Rankings from AP Poll. (#) Tournament seedings in parentheses. All times are in Eastern Time.
