= 2015–16 Marist Red Foxes men's basketball team =

American college basketball season

2015–16 Marist Red Foxes men's basketball
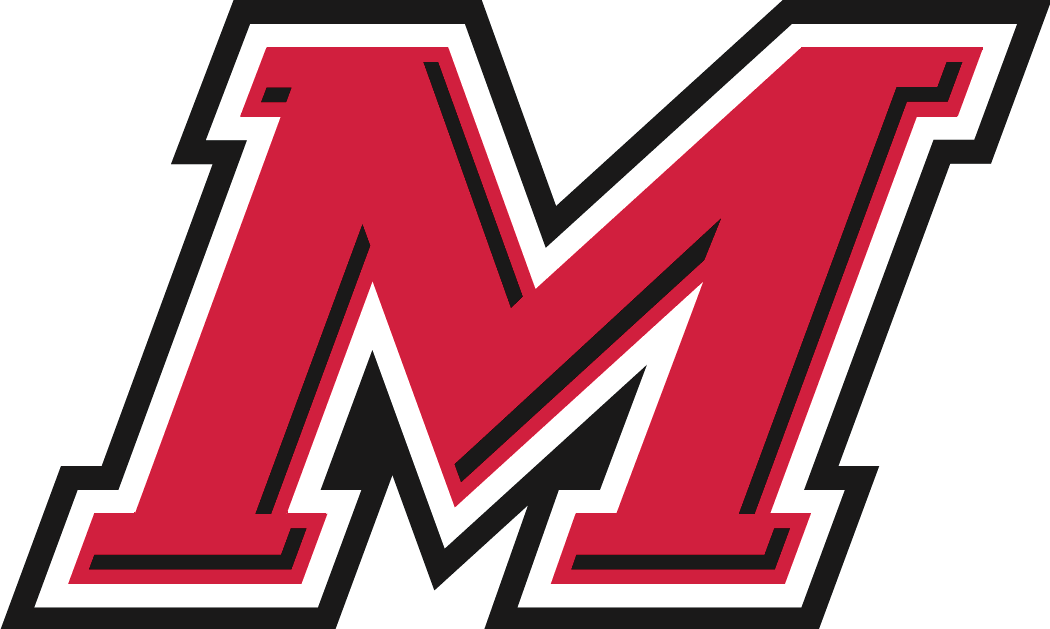
- Conference: Metro Atlantic Athletic Conference
- Record: 7–23 (4–16 MAAC)
- Head coach: Mike Maker (2nd season)
- Assistant coaches: Paul Lee; Andy Johnston; C. J. Lee
- Home arena: McCann Arena

2015–16 MAAC men's basketball standings
	Conf.				Overall
Team	W		L	PCT	W		L	PCT
Monmouth	17	–	3	.850	28	–	8	.778
Iona †	16	–	4	.800	22	–	11	.667
Siena	13	–	7	.650	21	–	13	.618
Fairfield	12	–	8	.600	19	–	14	.576
Saint Peter's	12	–	8	.600	14	–	16	.467
Manhattan	9	–	11	.450	13	–	18	.419
Canisius	8	–	12	.400	14	–	19	.424
Rider	8	–	12	.400	13	–	20	.394
Quinnipiac	6	–	14	.300	9	–	21	.300
Niagara	5	–	15	.250	7	–	25	.219
Marist	4	–	16	.200	7	–	23	.233
† 2016 MAAC tournament winner

The 2015–16 Marist Red Foxes men's basketball team represented Marist College during the 2015–16 NCAA Division I men's basketball season. The Red Foxes, led by second year head coach Mike Maker, played their home games at the McCann Arena and were members of the Metro Atlantic Athletic Conference. They finished the season 7–23 overall, 4–16 in MAAC play to finish in eleventh place. As the #11 seed in the 2016 MAAC tournament, they were defeated in the first round by #6 seed Manhattan 63–81.

== Previous season ==
The Red Foxes finished the 2014–15 season 7–25, 5–15 in MAAC play to finish in a tie for tenth place. They advanced to the quarterfinals of the MAAC tournament where they lost to Manhattan.

== Roster ==
2015–16 Marist Red Foxes men's basketball team
Players
Coaches

Pos.	#	Name	Height	Weight	Year	Previous school	Hometown
F	1	Kentrall Brooks	6 ft 8 in (2.03 m)	200 lb (91 kg)	Jr	St. Anthony (NJ)	Bronx, New York
G	2	Brian Parker	6 ft 2 in (1.88 m)	200 lb (91 kg)	Fr	Villa Angela-St. Joseph HS	Cleveland, Ohio
G/F	4	Isaiah Lamb	6 ft 5 in (1.96 m)	205 lb (93 kg)	Fr	Dulaney	Baltimore, Maryland
G	5	Khalid Hart	6 ft 2 in (1.88 m)	180 lb (82 kg)	RS Jr	Sanford School	Newark, Delaware
G	10	James Griffin	6 ft 5 in (1.96 m)	200 lb (91 kg)	So	Westwind Prep Academy	Brisbane, Queensland, Australia
G	11	K. J. Lee	6 ft 4 in (1.93 m)	185 lb (84 kg)	So	Salisbury School	Huntington Station, New York
G/F	13	Kristinn Palsson	6 ft 6 in (1.98 m)	200 lb (91 kg)	Fr	Marymount	Reykjanesbær, Iceland
F	15	Obi Momah	6 ft 7 in (2.01 m)	220 lb (100 kg)	So	Farmington	Farmington, Connecticut
G	21	Kyle Daugherty	6 ft 4 in (1.93 m)	185 lb (84 kg)	Fr	Phillips Exeter Academy	Reno, Nevada
G	24	Courtney Clyburn	6 ft 4 in (1.93 m)	180 lb (82 kg)	Fr	Trinity-Pawling	Rochester, New York
C	25	Connor McClenaghan	6 ft 9 in (2.06 m)	215 lb (98 kg)	So	Hebron	Carrollton, Texas
G/F	30	Ryan Funk	6 ft 6 in (1.98 m)	190 lb (86 kg)	Fr	St. Thomas More Prep	Clarence, New York
G	34	David Knudsen	6 ft 4 in (1.93 m)	190 lb (86 kg)	Fr	Falkonergardens	Copenhagen, Denmark
F	35	Phillip Lawrence-Ricks	6 ft 7 in (2.01 m)	190 lb (86 kg)	Sr	Mount St. Joseph	Baltimore, Maryland
C	44	Eric Truog	6 ft 10 in (2.08 m)	240 lb (109 kg)	Sr	Kenston	Chagrin Falls, Ohio

Head coach

- Mike Maker (Cal Baptist)

Assistant coach(es)

- Paul Lee (Columbia)
- Andy Johnston (New Hampshire)
- C.J. Lee (Michigan)

Legend

- (C) Team captain
- (S) Suspended
- (I) Ineligible
- (W) Walk-on
- Injured
- Current redshirt

Roster
Last update: 2015-11-13

== Schedule ==
Date time, TV	Rank^{#}	Opponent^{#}	Result	Record	Site (attendance) city, state
Regular season
11/13/2015*; 7:00 pm		Holy Cross	L 64–67	0–1	McCann Arena (1,707); Poughkeepsie, NY
11/17/2015*; 7:00 pm		Dartmouth	W 73–63	1–1	McCann Arena (1,187); Poughkeepsie, NY
11/21/2015*; 7:00 pm		at Kent State	L 72–79	1–2	MAC Center (3,822); Kent, OH
11/29/2015*; 2:00 pm		at Vermont	L 60–86	1–3	Patrick Gym (1,865); Burlington, VT
12/04/2015; 7:00 pm		Iona	L 66–101	1–4 (0–1)	McCann Arena (1,471); Poughkeepsie, NY
12/06/2015; 2:00 pm		at Manhattan	W 75–60	2–4 (1–1)	Draddy Gymnasium (811); Riverdale, NY
12/09/2015*; 7:00 pm		Albany	L 53–75	2–5	McCann Arena (1,210); Poughkeepsie, NY
12/12/2015*; 7:00 pm		Delaware	L 69–70	2–6	McCann Arena; Poughkeepsie, NY
12/20/2015*; 2:00 pm		at Army	W 89–83	3–6	Christl Arena (916); West Point, NY
12/22/2015*; 6:30 pm		vs. Brown; Hall of Fame Shootout	W 84–83 ^{2OT}	4–6	Mohegan Sun Arena; Uncasville, CT
12/29/2015*; 7:00 pm		at Jacksonville	L 68–69	4–7	Swisher Gymnasium (259); Jacksonville, FL
01/02/2016; 7:00 pm		Canisius	L 83–92	4–8 (1–2)	McCann Arena (1,200); Poughkeepsie, NY
01/04/2016; 7:00 pm		Saint Peter's	L 60–68	4–9 (1–3)	McCann Arena (809); Poughkeepsie, NY
01/09/2016; 4:00 pm		at Iona	L 80–90	4–10 (1–4)	Hynes Athletic Center (1,476); New Rochelle, NY
01/14/2016; 8:00 pm, ESPN3		at Rider	W 102–100 ^{2OT}	4–11 (1–5)	Alumni Gymnasium; Lawrenceville, NJ
01/17/2016; 2:00 pm, ESPN3		at Saint Peter's	L 67–76	4–12 (1–6)	Yanitelli Center (321); Jersey City, NY
01/22/2016; 7:00 pm, ESPN3		Fairfield	L 76–88	4–13 (1–7)	McCann Arena (1,338); Poughkeepsie, NY
01/24/2016; 2:00 pm		at Monmouth	L 72–83	4–14 (1–8)	Multipurpose Activity Center (2,785); West Long Branch, NJ
01/28/2016; 7:30 pm, ESPN3		Niagara	L 66–69	4–15 (1–9)	McCann Arena (1,017); Poughkeepsie, NY
01/30/2016; 7:00 pm		at Siena	L 66–77	4–16 (1–10)	Times Union Center (5,834); Albany, NY
02/04/2016; 7:00 pm, ESPN3		at Quinnipiac	L 53–79	4–17 (1–11)	TD Bank Sports Center (1,358); Hamden, CT
02/07/2016; 12:00 pm		Siena	W 79–73	5–17 (2–11)	McCann Arena; Poughkeepsie, NY
02/09/2016; 7:00 pm		Monmouth	L 61–87	5–18 (2–12)	McCann Arena (1,648); Poughkeepsie, NY
02/13/2016; 7:00 pm		Manhattan	L 73–81	5–19 (2–13)	McCann Arena (1,477); Poughkeepsie, NY
02/15/2016; 7:00 pm		at Fairfield	L 73–76	5–20 (2–14)	Webster Bank Arena (956); Bridgeport, CT
02/18/2016; 7:00 pm		at Niagara	L 72–76	5–21 (2–15)	Gallagher Center (1,163); Lewiston, NY
02/20/2016; 3:00 pm, ESPN3		at Canisius	L 66–81	5–22 (2–16)	Koessler Athletic Center (1,318); Buffalo, NY
02/23/2016; 7:00 pm		Rider	W 71–58	6–22 (3–16)	McCann Arena (1,001); Poughkeepsie, NY
02/26/2016; 7:00 pm, ESPN3		Quinnipiac	W 91–77	7–22 (4–16)	McCann Arena (1,275); Poughkeepsie, NY
MAAC tournament
03/03/2016; 9:00 pm	(11)	vs. (6) Manhattan; First round	L 63–81	7–23	Times Union Center (2,628); Albany, NY
*Non-conference game. ^{#}Rankings from AP Poll. (#) Tournament seedings in parentheses. All times are in Eastern Time.

== See also ==
2015–16 Marist Red Foxes women's basketball team
