= 2016 MAAC men's basketball tournament =

- Classification: Division I
- Season: 2015–16
- Teams: 11
- Site: Times Union Center; Albany, New York
- Champions: Iona (9th title)
- Winning coach: Tim Cluess (2nd title)
- MVP: A. J. English (Iona)
- Television: ESPN, ESPN3

2015–16 MAAC men's basketball standings
	Conf.				Overall
Team	W		L	PCT	W		L	PCT
Monmouth	17	–	3	.850	28	–	8	.778
Iona †	16	–	4	.800	22	–	11	.667
Siena	13	–	7	.650	21	–	13	.618
Fairfield	12	–	8	.600	19	–	14	.576
Saint Peter's	12	–	8	.600	14	–	16	.467
Manhattan	9	–	11	.450	13	–	18	.419
Canisius	8	–	12	.400	14	–	19	.424
Rider	8	–	12	.400	13	–	20	.394
Quinnipiac	6	–	14	.300	9	–	21	.300
Niagara	5	–	15	.250	7	–	25	.219
Marist	4	–	16	.200	7	–	23	.233
† 2016 MAAC tournament winner

The 2016 Metro Atlantic Athletic Conference men's basketball tournament was the postseason men's basketball tournament for the Metro Atlantic Athletic Conference for the 2015–16 NCAA Division I men's basketball season. It was held from March 3–7, 2016 at the Times Union Center in Albany, New York. No. 2 seed Iona upset No. 1 seed Monmouth 79–76 in the championship game and received the conference's automatic bid to the 2016 NCAA tournament. It was the fourth consecutive championship game for Iona, and their conference leading ninth MAAC tournament championship.

== Seeds ==
All 11 teams in the conference participated in the Tournament. The top five teams received byes to the Quarterfinals.

Teams were seeded by record within the conference, with a tiebreaker system to seed teams with identical conference records.

Seed	School	Conference	Tiebreaker
1	Monmouth	17–3	
2	Iona	14–6	
3	Siena	13–7	
4	Saint Peter's	12–8	2–0 vs. Fairfield
5	Fairfield	12–8	0–2 vs. Saint Peter's
6	Manhattan	9–11	
7	Canisius	8–12	1–1 vs. Rider. 1–1 vs. Monmouth
8	Rider	8–12	1–1 vs. Canisius, 0–2 vs. Monmouth
9	Quinnipiac	6–14	
10	Niagara	5–15	
11	Marist	4–16	

== Schedule ==
Session	Game	Time*	Matchup^{#}	Score	Television
First round – Thursday, March 3
1	1	5:00 PM	No. 8 Rider vs No. 9 Quinnipiac	69–88	
1	2	7:00 PM	No. 7 Canisius vs No. 10 Niagara	102–97 ^{3OT}	
1	3	9:00 PM	No. 6 Manhattan vs No. 11 Marist	81–63	
Quarterfinals – Friday, March 4
2	4	7:00 PM	No. 1 Monmouth vs No. 8 Rider	59–48	ESPN3
2	5	9:30 PM	No. 2 Iona vs. No. 7 Canisius	73–55	ESPN3
Quarterfinals – Saturday, March 5
3	6	7:00 PM	No. 3 Siena vs No. 6 Manhattan	89–76	ESPN3
3	7	9:30 PM	No. 4 Saint Peter's vs. No. 5 Fairfield	55–64	ESPN3
Semifinals – Sunday, March 6
4	8	4:30 PM	No. 1 Monmouth vs No. 5 Fairfield	76–63	ESPN3
4	9	7:00 PM	No. 2 Iona vs No. 3 Siena	81–70	ESPN3
Championship – Monday, March 7
5	10	7:00 PM	No. 1 Monmouth vs No. 2 Iona	76–79	ESPN
*Game times in ET. #-Rankings denote tournament seeding.

== Bracket ==
First round Thursday, March 3
8	Rider	60
9	Quinnipiac	57
7	Canisius	102
10	Niagara	97^{3OT}
6	Manhattan	81
11	Marist	63

Quarterfinals; Friday, March 4 Saturday, March 5 ESPN3
1	Monmouth	59
8	Rider	48
4	Saint Peter's	55
5	Fairfield	64
2	Iona	73
7	Canisius	55
3	Siena	89
6	Manhattan	76

Semifinals; Sunday, March 6 ESPN3
1	Monmouth	76
5	Fairfield	63
2	Iona	81
3	Siena	70

Championship; Monday, March 7 ESPN
1	Monmouth	76
2	Iona	79

== All-Championship Team ==
2016 MAAC Men's Basketball All-Championship Team
- Brett Bisping, Siena
- Jelon Hornbreak, Monmouth
- Justin Robinson, Monmouth
- Jordan Washington, Iona
- Isaiah Williams, Iona
- A.J. English^{MVP}, Iona
