= OceanFirst Bank Center =

Arena in West Long Branch, New Jersey

Hackensack Meridian Athletic Center
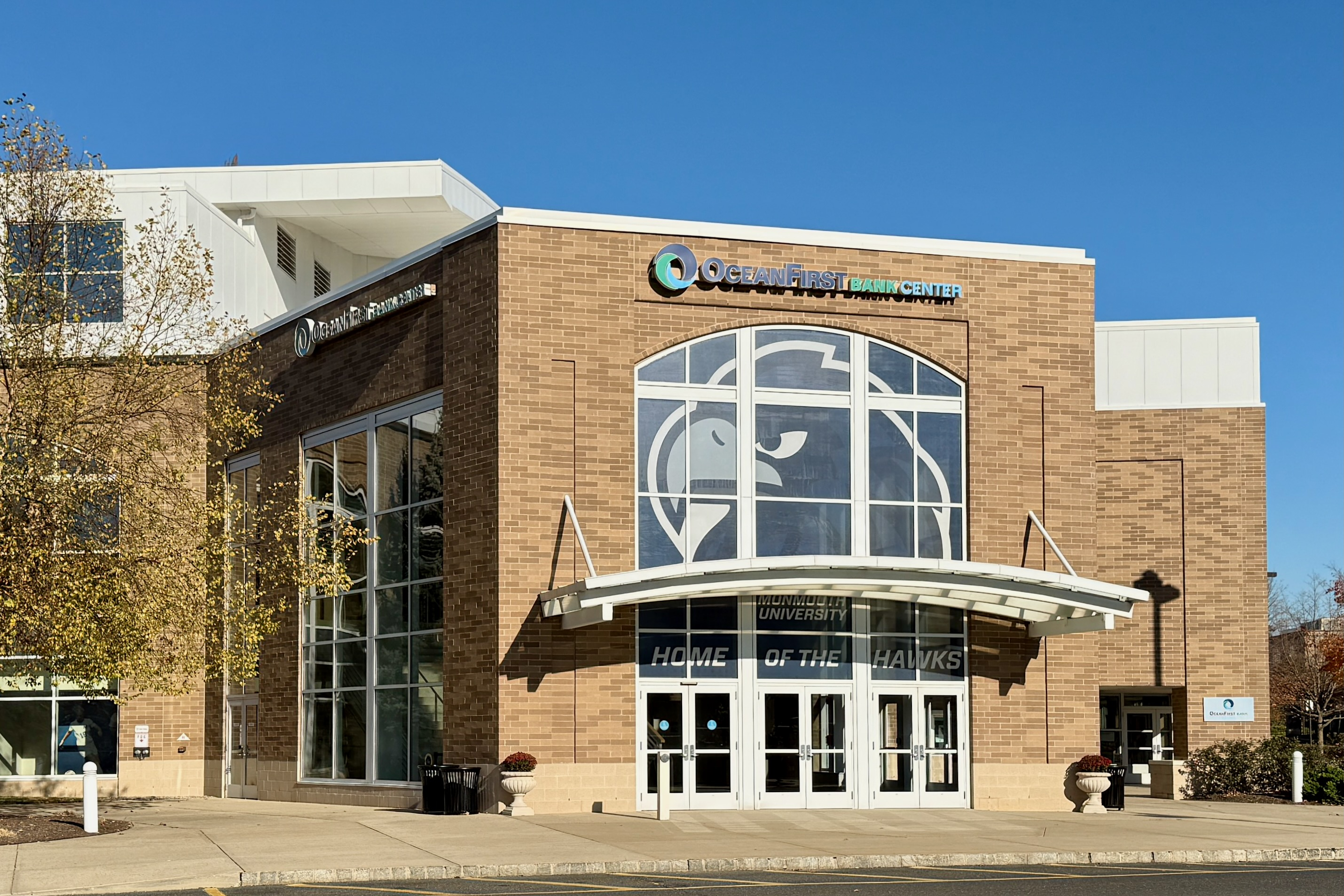
- Interactive map of Hackensack Meridian Athletic Center
- Former names: Multipurpose Activity Center (2009–2016) OceanFirst Bank Center (2016-2026)
- Location: 400 Cedar Avenue; West Long Branch, New Jersey 07764
- Coordinates: 40°16′46.11″N 74°0′27.3″W
- Owner: Monmouth University
- Operator: Monmouth University
- Capacity: 4,100 people, 3886 seats
- Surface: Hardwood

Construction
- Groundbreaking: September 8, 2007
- Opened: August 26, 2009
- Cost: $57 million ($85.5 million in 2025 dollars)
- Architects: EwingCole; Rosser International
- Project manager: Sordoni Construction Co.
- General contractors: Torcon, Inc.

Tenants
- Monmouth Hawks men's basketball Monmouth Hawks women's basketball

Hackensack Meridian Athletic Center (formerly OceanFirst Bank Center and Multipurpose Activity Center) is a multi-purpose student recreational facility at Monmouth University in West Long Branch, New Jersey. It was opened on August 26, 2009. It currently hosts the Monmouth Hawks basketball teams. It has a seating capacity of 3,886 spectators. It adjoins the William T. Boylan Gymnasium. The venue cost $57 million to construct.

The facility was originally named the Multipurpose Activity Center until June 2016, and OceanFirst Bank Center until July 2026, when the university and Hackensack Meridian Health that included expanding the facility, which adds 22,745 more square feet for the facility, and gaining the naming rights of the facility. The basketball court is named "Gaffney Court" in honor of former university president Vice Admiral Paul G. Gaffney II.

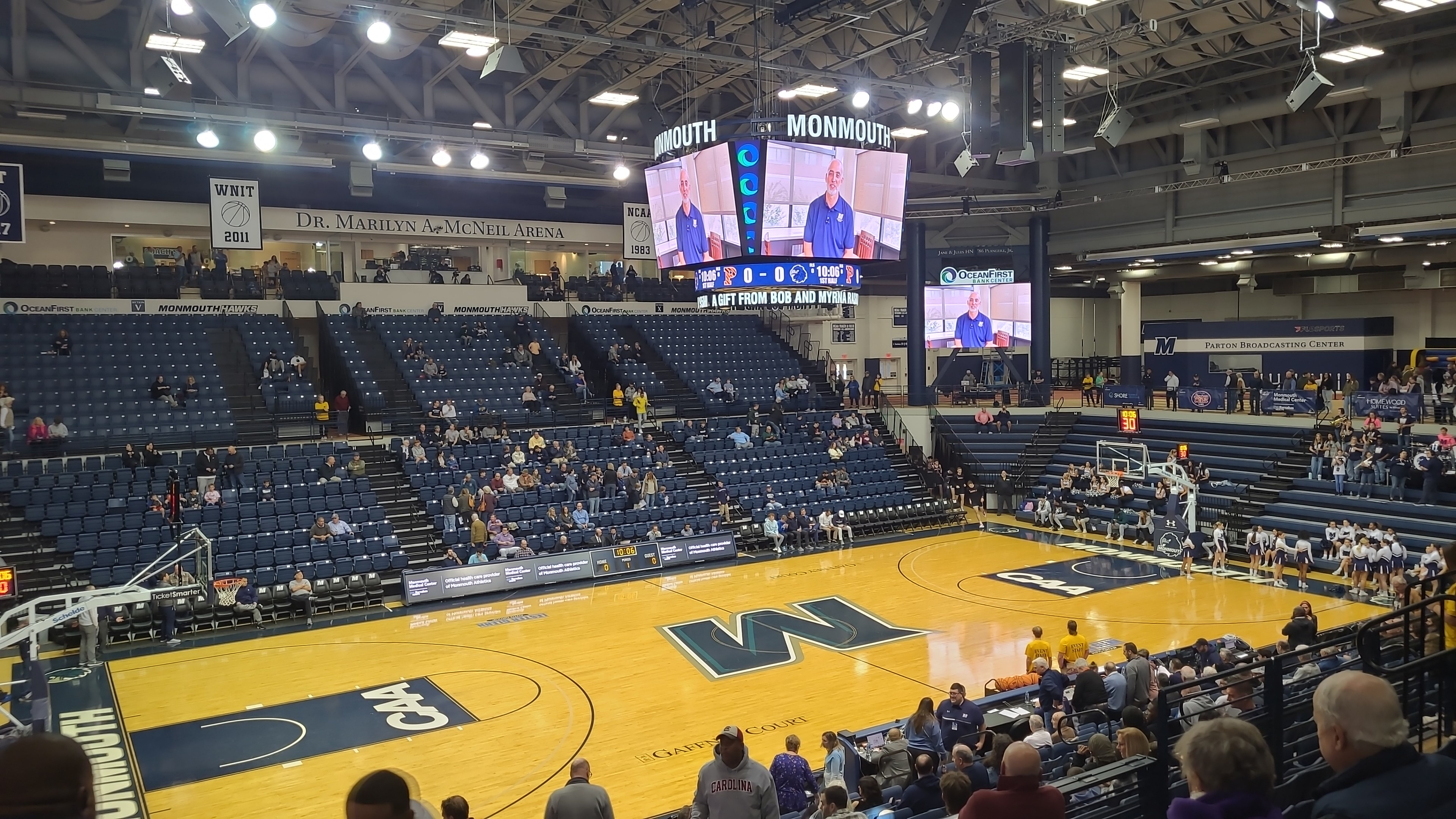
Basketball arena

== See also ==
- List of NCAA Division I basketball arenas
