= John Giannini =

American college basketball coach (born 1962)

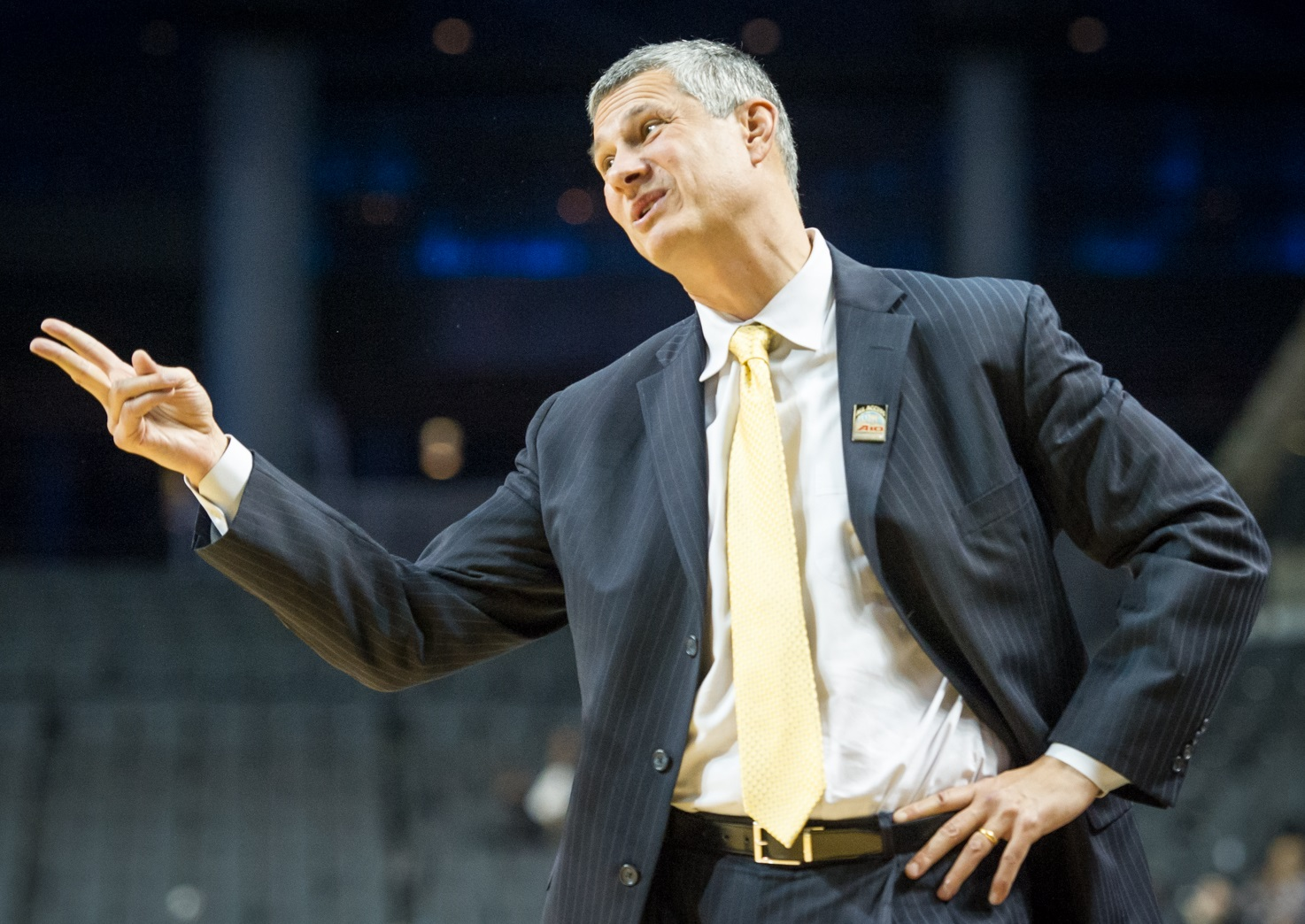
- Giannini during the 2016 Atlantic 10 men's basketball tournament

Biographical details
- Born: October 31, 1962 (age 63); Chicago, Illinois, U.S.
- Education: North Central (B.S., 1984); North Texas (M.S., 1986); Illinois (Ph.D., 1992)

Coaching career (HC unless noted)
- 1987–1989: Illinois (assistant)
- 1989–1996: Rowan
- 1996–2004: Maine
- 2004–2018: La Salle

Head coaching record
- Overall: 508–375

Accomplishments and honors

Championships
- NCAA Division III (1996)

John Manfredo Giannini (born October 31, 1962) is an American college basketball coach, Director of Athletics at Rowan University, and college basketball analyst for NBC Sports and other networks. He served as the head men's basketball coach at Rowan University from 1989 to 1996, the University of Maine from 1996 to 2004, and La Salle University from 2004 to 2018. Giannini led Rowan to an NCAA Division III men's basketball tournament championship in 1996 and led La Salle to the Sweet Sixteen of the NCAA Division I men's basketball tournament in 2013. Giannini amassed more than 500 victories in his collegiate coaching career.

== Early life ==
The son of Italian immigrants, Giannini grew up in Elmwood Park, a suburb of Chicago, and has three younger brothers. He attended Fenwick High School in Oak Park, and received a bachelor's degree in psychology from North Central College in Naperville. Giannini also holds a master's degree in physical education with a specialization in sports psychology from North Texas University, as well as a doctorate in kinesiology with a specialization in sports psychology from the University of Illinois at Urbana–Champaign.

== Coaching career ==
=== Illinois ===
From 1987 through 1989, Giannini served as a graduate assistant on coach Lou Henson's staff at the University of Illinois. In Giannini's final season on Henson's staff, the Fighting Illini, led by Kendall Gill, Kenny Battle, Stephen Bardo, Tyler Cottingham, Lowell Hamilton and Marcus Liberty, made the Final Four.

=== Rowan ===
Giannini's first head coaching job came at Rowan University, a Division III school, when he was hired as the men's coach in 1989. Giannini totaled a 168–38 record in seven seasons at Rowan, which included five NCAA Tournament appearances and three Final Four berths. The 1995-96 squad reached the pinnacle, going 28-4 and captured the 1996 Division III national title, the only one in the program's history. Following that season, Giannini owned the highest winning percentage (.814) in the nation among all active NCAA coaches.

In 2004, Giannini was inducted into the Rowan University-Glassboro State College Hall of Fame while his 1996 national champion team was inducted into the Hall of Fame in 2019.

=== Maine ===
Following Rowan's championship season, Giannini accepted the head coaching position at the University of Maine, a position he held for eight years. His Maine teams made five trips to the America East Conference semi-finals or better, and made appearances in the conference championship game two of Giannini's last three seasons. Giannini's two 20-win seasons are the only two on record in program history, and his .530 winning percentage is the highest in school history.

=== La Salle ===
On August 23, 2004, Giannini was hired as the eighteenth head coach of the La Salle men's basketball team. He succeeded Billy Hahn, who was forced to resign that July.

The 2005–06 season, Giannini's second at La Salle, set records for most Atlantic 10 wins in a season (ten), most Atlantic 10 road wins in a single season (four) and was the program's first winning season since the 1992–93 season, when the school competed in the Midwestern Collegiate Conference (now known as the Horizon League). Giannini was named a Jim Phelan Award candidate for National Coach of the Year.

Giannini spent 14 years as head men's basketball coach at La Salle, from 2004 to 2018, a tenure that was highlighted by an NCAA Division I men's basketball tournament Sweet 16 appearance in 2012–13. Under Giannini's leadership at La Salle, the basketball program achieved academic success as well. During his last four years as head coach, La Salle was honored by the NCAA for having one of the best academic progress rates in the country. In addition, 100 percent of his seniors at La Salle graduated.

On March 23, 2018, Giannini and La Salle mutually agreed to part ways after 14 seasons.

==== Postseason breakthroughs ====
The 2011–12 Explorers won 21 games, the program's highest win total since 1992, and received an invitation to the 2012 NIT, the program's first postseason tournament appearance since 1992. La Salle lost its first-round game at home to eventual tournament runner-up Minnesota.

The following season, La Salle went 24-10 and defeated three nationally ranked squads during the regular season. The Explorers received their first invitation to the NCAA tournament since 1992, when they received an at-large bid. In the opening round, La Salle defeated fellow thirteen seed Boise State, before defeating fourth-seeded Kansas State in the second round. After defeating twelfth-seeded Ole Miss in the third round, La Salle lost to Wichita State in the Sweet Sixteen. The Explorers captured the nation's attention during their run, in which they won three games in five days. La Salle's appearance in the Sweet Sixteen made it only the sixth program seeded thirteenth or lower to advance that far, and its three tournament wins were the program's first since 1990. It was also the program's deepest tournament run since 1955, when the Tom Gola-led Explorers lost in the national championship game. The team's 24 overall victories were the seventh-most in school history, and its 11 victories in the Atlantic Ten were the most ever. The Explorers also finished ranked 24th in the nation in the final USA Today Coaches Poll of the season.

== Personal life ==
Giannini and his wife Donna have two daughters.

Giannini is the author of numerous research journal articles and practical articles for coaching publications and wrote Court Sense: Winning Basketball’s Mental Game, published in 2008. He has taught courses at Illinois, North Texas, Maine and Rowan.

Giannini has volunteered his time to raise money for research in the fights against cancer and ALS. Additionally, he supports Philadelphia Youth Basketball and Samaritan's Feet, which works to provide shoes to children around the world.

== Head coaching record ==
Record table
Season	Team	Overall	Conference	Standing	Postseason
Glassboro State / Rowan Profs (New Jersey Athletic Conference) (1989–1996)
1989–90	Glassboro State	17–11	11–7	4th	
1990–91	Glassboro State	20–8	13–5	3rd	NCAA Division III Second Round
1991–92	Glassboro State	21–7	13–4	2nd	
1992–93	Rowan	29–2	17–1	1st	NCAA Division III Final Four
1993–94	Rowan	26–2	17–1	1st	NCAA Division III Sectional Semifinal
1994–95	Rowan	27–4	15–3	1st	NCAA Division III Final Four
1995–96	Rowan	28–4	16–2	T–1st	NCAA Division III Champion
Rowan:		168–38 (.816)	102–23		
Maine Black Bears (America East Conference) (1996–2004)
1996–97	Maine	11–20	6–12	T–7th	
1997–98	Maine	7–20	4–14	T–9th	
1998–99	Maine	19–9	13–5	4th	
1999–00	Maine	24–7	15–3	2nd	
2000–01	Maine	18–11	10–8	4th	
2001–02	Maine	12–18	7–9	5th	
2002–03	Maine	14–16	8–8	T–5th	
2003–04	Maine	20–10	12–6	4th	
Maine:		125–111 (.530)	75–65 (.536)		
La Salle Explorers (Atlantic 10 Conference) (2004–2018)
2004–05	La Salle	10–19	5–11	6th (West)	
2005–06	La Salle	18–10	10–6	T–3rd	
2006–07	La Salle	10–20	3–13	14th	
2007–08	La Salle	15–17	8–8	T–7th	
2008–09	La Salle	18–13	9–7	T–5th	
2009–10	La Salle	12–18	4–12	13th	
2010–11	La Salle	15–18	6–10	10th	
2011–12	La Salle	21–13	9–7	6th	NIT First Round
2012–13	La Salle	24–10	11–5	T–3rd	NCAA Division I Sweet 16
2013–14	La Salle	15–16	7–9	8th	
2014–15	La Salle	17–16	8–10	9th	
2015–16	La Salle	9–22	4–14	14th	
2016–17	La Salle	15–15	9–9	T–7th	
2017–18	La Salle	13–19	7–11	T–10th	
La Salle:		212–226 (.484)	100–132 (.431)		
Total:		508–375 (.575)			
National champion Postseason invitational champion Conference regular season champion Conference regular season and conference tournament champion Division regular season champion Division regular season and conference tournament champion Conference tournament champion
