= 2015–16 Richmond Spiders men's basketball team =

American college basketball season

2015–16 Richmond Spiders men's basketball
- Conference: Atlantic 10 Conference
- Record: 16–16 (7–11 A-10)
- Head coach: Chris Mooney (11th season)
- Assistant coaches: Rob Jones (8th season); Kim Lewis (3rd season); Marcus Jenkins (1st season)
- Home arena: Robins Center

2015–16 Atlantic 10 men's basketball standings
	Conf.				Overall
Team	W		L	PCT	W		L	PCT
Dayton	14	–	4	.778	25	–	8	.758
VCU	14	–	4	.778	25	–	11	.694
St. Bonaventure	14	–	4	.778	22	–	9	.710
Saint Joseph's †	13	–	5	.722	28	–	8	.778
George Washington	11	–	7	.611	28	–	10	.737
Davidson	10	–	8	.556	20	–	13	.606
Rhode Island	9	–	9	.500	17	–	15	.531
Fordham	8	–	10	.444	17	–	14	.548
Richmond	7	–	11	.389	16	–	16	.500
UMass	6	–	12	.333	14	–	18	.438
Duquesne	6	–	12	.333	17	–	17	.500
George Mason	5	–	13	.278	11	–	21	.344
Saint Louis	5	–	13	.278	11	–	21	.344
La Salle	4	–	14	.222	9	–	22	.290
† 2016 A10 Tournament winner

The 2015–16 Richmond Spiders men's basketball team represented the University of Richmond during the 2015–16 NCAA Division I men's basketball season. Richmond competed as a member of the Atlantic 10 Conference under 11th-year head coach Chris Mooney and played its home games at the Robins Center. They finished the season 16–16, 7–11 in A-10 play to finish in ninth place. They defeated Fordham in the second round of the A-10 tournament to advance to the quarterfinals where they lost to Dayton.

== Previous season ==
The Spiders finished the 2014–15 season 21–14, 12–6 in A-10 play to finish in a tie for fourth place. They lost in the quarterfinals of the A-10 tournament to VCU. They were invited to the National Invitation Tournament where they defeated St. Francis Brooklyn in the first round and Arizona State in the second round to advance to the quarterfinals where they lost to Miami (FL).

== Departures ==
Name	Number	Pos.	Height	Weight	Year	Hometown	Notes
Kendall Anthony	0	G	5'8"	150	Senior	Jackson, Tennessee	Graduated
Zach Chu	30	G	5'10	160	Senior	Dallas, Texas	Graduated (walk-on)
Chandler Diekvoss	22	F	6'6"	200	Freshman	De Pere, Wisconsin	Transferred to Lindenwood
Josh Jones	1	G	6'4"	190	Sophomore	Memphis, Tennessee	Dismissed prior to start of 2015–16 regular season
Alonzo Nelson-Ododa	33	F	6'9"	235	RS Junior	Atlanta, Georgia	Graduate transferred to Pittsburgh
Kadeem Smithen	12	G	6'3"	165	Freshman	Ajax, Ontario	Transferred to Siena

== Recruiting ==
College recruiting information
Name	Hometown	School	Height	Weight	Commit date
KoVien Dominaus; F	Baton Rouge, Louisiana	Independence HS (OH)	6 ft 5 in (1.96 m)	170 lb (77 kg)	May 29, 2015
KoVien Dominaus; F	Recruit ratings: No ratings found				
Julius Johnson; G	Cocoa, Florida	Florida Air Academy	6 ft 2 in (1.88 m)	185 lb (84 kg)	Aug 21, 2014
Julius Johnson; G	Recruit ratings: (69)				
Jesse Pistokache; G	Mission, Texas	Johnson Ferry (GA)	6 ft 2 in (1.88 m)	180 lb (82 kg)	Apr 22, 2015
Jesse Pistokache; G	Recruit ratings: (75)				
Keith Oddo; G	Roanoke, Virginia	North Cross	6 ft 0 in (1.83 m)	180 lb (82 kg)	
Keith Oddo; G	Recruit ratings: No ratings found				
Overall recruit ranking: Scout: NR Rivals: NR ESPN: NR
Note: In many cases, Scout, Rivals, 247Sports, On3, and ESPN may conflict in their listings of height and weight.; In these cases, the average was taken. ESPN grades are on a 100-point scale.; Sources: "Rivals.com 2015 Richmond Commitments". Rivals.; "Scout.com 2015 Richmond Commitments". Scout.; "ESPN 2015 Richmond Commitments". ESPN.; "Scout.com Team Recruiting Rankings". Scout.; "2015 Team Ranking". Rivals.

== Roster ==
2015–16 Richmond Spiders men's basketball team
Players
Coaches

Pos.	#	Name	Height	Weight	Year	Hometown
G	2	Khwan Fore	6 ft 0 in (1.83 m)	175 lb (79 kg)	RS Fr	Huntsville, Alabama
G	3	ShawnDre' Jones	5 ft 11 in (1.8 m)	165 lb (75 kg)	Jr	Houston, Texas
G	4	Keith Oddo (W)	6 ft 0 in (1.83 m)	180 lb (82 kg)	Fr	Roanoke, Virginia
G/F	5	Trey Davis	6 ft 5 in (1.96 m)	215 lb (98 kg)	RS Sr	Richmond, Virginia
F	10	T. J. Cline	6 ft 9 in (2.06 m)	235 lb (107 kg)	RS Jr	Plano, Texas
F	11	Deion Taylor	6 ft 7 in (2.01 m)	215 lb (98 kg)	Sr	New Orleans, Louisiana
G	13	John Moran (W)	6 ft 3 in (1.91 m)	185 lb (84 kg)	Sr	Phoenixville, Pennsylvania
F	15	Terry Allen	6 ft 8 in (2.03 m)	240 lb (109 kg)	Sr	Houston, Texas
F	24	Marshall Wood	6 ft 8 in (2.03 m)	220 lb (100 kg)	RS Jr	Rustburg, Virginia
G	25	Joe Kirby	6 ft 1 in (1.85 m)	200 lb (91 kg)	So	Pembroke Pines, Florida
G	30	Jesse Pistokache	6 ft 3 in (1.91 m)	180 lb (82 kg)	Fr	Mission, Texas
G	32	Julius Johnson	6 ft 3 in (1.91 m)	185 lb (84 kg)	Fr	Cocoa, Florida
F	35	KoVien Dominaus	6 ft 7 in (2.01 m)	170 lb (77 kg)	Fr	Columbus, Ohio
F	44	Paul Friendshuh	6 ft 10 in (2.08 m)	235 lb (107 kg)	RS Fr	New Prague, Minnesota

Head coach

- Chris Mooney (Princeton)

Assistant coach(es)

- Rob Jones (Toccoa Falls)
- Kim Lewis (Tulane)
- Marcus Jenkins (Air Force)

Legend

- (C) Team captain
- (S) Suspended
- (I) Ineligible
- (W) Walk-on
- Injured
- Current redshirt

Roster
Last update: 2015-11-15

== Schedule ==
Date time, TV	Rank^{#}	Opponent^{#}	Result	Record	Site (attendance) city, state
Non-conference regular season
November 13*; 7:00 pm, CBS 6.2		James Madison	L 75–87	0–1	Robins Center (7,201); Richmond, Virginia
November 15*; 5:00 pm, CBS 6.3		Stetson; Las Vegas Invitational	W 108–85	1–1	Robins Center (4,735); Richmond, Virginia
November 18*; 7:00 pm, ESPN3		at Wake Forest	W 91–82	2–1	LJVM Coliseum (7,021); Winston-Salem, North Carolina
November 21*; 6:00 pm		Bethune-Cookman; Las Vegas Invitational	W 89–64	3–1	Robins Center (5,625); Richmond, Virginia
November 26*; 5:00 pm, FS1		vs. West Virginia; Las Vegas Invitational semifinals	L 59–67	3–2	Orleans Arena; Paradise, Nevada
November 27*; 8:00 pm, FS1		vs. No. 14 California; Las Vegas Invitational 3rd place game	W 94–90	4–2	Orleans Arena; Paradise, Nevada
December 1*; 7:00 pm, SECN		at Florida	L 56–76	4–3	O'Connell Center (8,231); Gainesville, Florida
December 5*; 6:00 pm, CSN/CBS 6.3		Northern Iowa	W 82–67	5–3	Robins Center (6,323); Richmond, Virginia
December 12*; 6:30 pm, CBS 6		Longwood	W 77–59	6–3	Robins Center (6,493); Richmond, Virginia
December 16*; 7:00 pm, ASN		Old Dominion	W 77–61	7–3	Robins Center (5,533); Richmond, Virginia
December 22* noon		Presbyterian	W 74–44	8–3	Robins Center (6,056); Richmond, Virginia
December 29*; 5:00 pm, FSSW+		at Texas Tech	L 70–85	8–4	United Supermarkets Arena (1,994); Lubbock, Texas
Atlantic 10 regular season
January 2; 12:30 pm, NBCSN		Saint Joseph's	L 73–77	8–5 (0–1)	Robins Center (7,048); Richmond, Virginia
January 5; 7:00 pm, ESPNU		at Rhode Island	L 65–77	8–6 (0–2)	Ryan Center (4,017); Kingston, Rhode Island
January 10; 2:00 pm, NBCSN		at Fordham	W 93–82	9–6 (1–2)	Rose Hill Gymnasium (2,385); Bronx, New York
January 13; 7:00 pm, CBS 6.3		La Salle	W 83–61	10–6 (2–2)	Robins Center (5,257); Richmond, Virginia
January 16; 2:00 pm, CBSSN		VCU; Capital City Classic	L 89–94 ^{OT}	10–7 (2–3)	Robins Center (7,201); Richmond, Virginia
January 25; 7:00 pm, NBCSN		Davidson	L 70–78	10–8 (2–4)	Robins Center (6,570); Richmond, Virginia
January 28; 9:00 pm, ESPNU		at George Washington	W 98–90 ^{2OT}	11–8 (3–4)	Charles E. Smith Center (3,367); Washington, D.C.
January 31; 3:00 pm, ASN		at St. Bonaventure	L 68–84	11–9 (3–5)	Reilly Center (5,263); Olean, New York
February 3; 7:00 pm, CBS 6.3		George Mason	L 74–78	11–10 (3–6)	Robins Center; Richmond, Virginia
February 6; 6:00 pm, CSN+		Massachusetts	W 69–53	12–10 (4–6)	Robins Center (7,201); Richmond, Virginia
February 10; 8:00 pm, FSMW		at Saint Louis	W 67–53	13–10 (5–6)	Chaifetz Arena (5,154); Saint Louis, Missouri
February 13; 6:00 pm, CSN+		Fordham	W 71–67	14–10 (6–6)	Robins Center (7,201); Richmond, Virginia
February 16; 7:00 pm, ASN		at Davidson	L 79–83	14–11 (6–7)	John M. Belk Arena (3,832); Davidson, North Carolina
February 19; 7:00 pm, ESPN2		at VCU; Capital City Classic	L 74–87	14–12 (6–8)	Siegel Center (7,637); Richmond, Virginia
February 24; 7:00 pm, ASN		George Washington	L 61–73	14–13 (6–9)	Robins Center (7,201); Richmond, Virginia
February 27; 6:00 pm, ASN		at Duquesne	W 83–67	15–13 (7–9)	Palumbo Center (1,916); Pittsburgh, Pennsylvania
March 1; 7:30 pm, CBSSN		Dayton	L 84–85	15–14 (7–10)	Robins Center (7,081); Richmond, Virginia
March 5; 6:00 pm, ASN		at George Mason	L 73–83	15–15 (7–11)	Patriot Center (6,765); Fairfax, Virginia
Atlantic 10 tournament
March 10; 12:00 pm, NBCSN	(9)	vs. (8) Fordham; Second round	W 70–55	16–15	Barclays Center (6,519); Brooklyn, New York
March 11; 12:00 pm, NBCSN	(9)	vs. (1) Dayton; Quarterfinals	L 54–69	16–16	Barclays Center (8,223); Brooklyn, New York
*Non-conference game. ^{#}Rankings from AP Poll. (#) Tournament seedings in parentheses. All times are in Eastern Time.
