= 2015–16 Saint Joseph's Hawks men's basketball team =

American college basketball season

2015–16 Saint Joseph's Hawks men's basketball
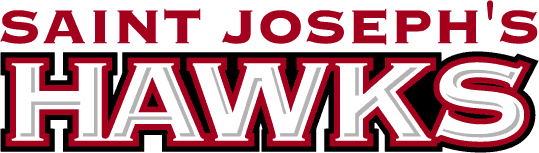

Atlantic 10 tournament champions

NCAA tournament, Second Round
- Conference: Atlantic 10 Conference
- Record: 28–8 (13–5 A-10)
- Head coach: Phil Martelli (21st season)
- Assistant coaches: Mark Bass; David Duda; Geoff Arnold
- Home arena: Hagan Arena

2015–16 Atlantic 10 men's basketball standings
	Conf.				Overall
Team	W		L	PCT	W		L	PCT
Dayton	14	–	4	.778	25	–	8	.758
VCU	14	–	4	.778	25	–	11	.694
St. Bonaventure	14	–	4	.778	22	–	9	.710
Saint Joseph's †	13	–	5	.722	28	–	8	.778
George Washington	11	–	7	.611	28	–	10	.737
Davidson	10	–	8	.556	20	–	13	.606
Rhode Island	9	–	9	.500	17	–	15	.531
Fordham	8	–	10	.444	17	–	14	.548
Richmond	7	–	11	.389	16	–	16	.500
UMass	6	–	12	.333	14	–	18	.438
Duquesne	6	–	12	.333	17	–	17	.500
George Mason	5	–	13	.278	11	–	21	.344
Saint Louis	5	–	13	.278	11	–	21	.344
La Salle	4	–	14	.222	9	–	22	.290
† 2016 A10 Tournament winner

The 2015–16 Saint Joseph's Hawks basketball team represented Saint Joseph's University during the 2015–16 NCAA Division I men's basketball season. The Hawks, led by 21st year head coach Phil Martelli, played their home games at Hagan Arena and are members of the Atlantic 10 Conference. The Hawks finished the season 28–8, 13–5 in A-10 play to finish in fourth place. They defeated George Washington, Dayton, and VCU to be champions of the A-10 tournament and earn the conference's automatic bid to the NCAA tournament. As a #8 seed, they defeated Cincinnati in the first round, their first NCAA Tournament victory since 2004, to advance to the second round where they lost to Oregon. DeAndre' Bembry was named A-10 player of the year.

== Previous season ==
The Hawks finished the 2014–15 season 13–18, 7–11 in A-10 play to finish in tenth place. They lost in the second round of the A-10 tournament to St. Bonaventure.

== Departures ==
Name	Number	Pos.	Height	Weight	Year	Hometown	Notes
Evan Maschemeyer	0	G	6'3"	200	Senior	Jeffersonville, IN	Graduated
Obi Romeo	5	F	6'10"	231	Freshman	Lewisburg, WV	Transferred to Pensacola State College
Kyle Molock	22	G	6'2"	192	RS Sophomore	Dublin, OH	Retired from basketball due a knee injury
Chris Wilson	24	G	6'3"	210	Senior	Fayetteville, NC	Graduated

== Incoming recruits ==
College recruiting information
Name	Hometown	School	Height	Weight	Commit date
Chris Clover; SG	Natrona Heights, PA	St. Joseph's Prep School	6 ft 3 in (1.91 m)	180 lb (82 kg)	Aug 3, 2014
Chris Clover; SG	Recruit ratings: Scout: Rivals: 247Sports: ESPN: (79)				
LaMarr Kimble; PG	Philadelphia, PA	Neumann-Goretti High School	6 ft 0 in (1.83 m)	175 lb (79 kg)	Aug 1, 2014
LaMarr Kimble; PG	Recruit ratings: Scout: Rivals: 247Sports: ESPN: (79)				
Pierfrancesco Oliva; PF	Oradell, NJ	Bergen Catholic High School	6 ft 8 in (2.03 m)	200 lb (91 kg)	Nov 25, 2014
Pierfrancesco Oliva; PF	Recruit ratings: Scout: Rivals: 247Sports: ESPN: (65)				
Overall recruit ranking:
Note: In many cases, Scout, Rivals, 247Sports, On3, and ESPN may conflict in their listings of height and weight.; In these cases, the average was taken. ESPN grades are on a 100-point scale.; Sources: "Saint Joseph's Hawks". ESPN.; "2015 Team Ranking". Rivals.

=== Recruits Class of 2016 ===
College recruiting information (2016)
Name	Hometown	School	Height	Weight	Commit date
Charlie Brown; SG	St. Thomas More School	Philadelphia, PA	6 ft 6 in (1.98 m)	180 lb (82 kg)	
Charlie Brown; SG	Recruit ratings: Scout: Rivals: 247Sports: ESPN: (POST)				
Overall recruit ranking:
Note: In many cases, Scout, Rivals, 247Sports, On3, and ESPN may conflict in their listings of height and weight.; In these cases, the average was taken. ESPN grades are on a 100-point scale.; Sources: "Saint Joseph's Hawks". ESPN.; "2015 Team Ranking". Rivals.

== Roster ==
2015–16 Saint Joseph's Hawks men's basketball team
Players
Coaches

Pos.	#	Name	Height	Weight	Year	Previous school	Hometown
G	0	Lamarr Kimble	6 ft 0 in (1.83 m)	197 lb (89 kg)	Fr	Neumann-Goretti	Philadelphia, PA
G	1	Shavar Newkirk	6 ft 0 in (1.83 m)	175 lb (79 kg)	So	Cardinal Hayes	Bronx, NY
G	2	Aaron Brown	6 ft 5 in (1.96 m)	223 lb (101 kg)	RS Sr	Penn Wood/West Virginia	Darby, PA
G	3	Mike Booth (W)	6 ft 3 in (1.91 m)	199 lb (90 kg)	So	Bishop Shanahan	Thornton, PA
G	11	Chris Clover	6 ft 3 in (1.91 m)	215 lb (98 kg)	Fr	St. Joseph's Prep	Philadelphia, PA
F	12	Papa Ndao	6 ft 8 in (2.03 m)	220 lb (100 kg)	RS Sr	Montverde Academy	Dakar, Senegal
F	15	Isaiah Miles	6 ft 7 in (2.01 m)	227 lb (103 kg)	Sr	Milford Mill	Baltimore, MD
F	20	Brendan Casper (W)	6 ft 6 in (1.98 m)	215 lb (98 kg)	Jr	Methacton	Audubon, PA
G	21	Kyle Thompson (W)	6 ft 2 in (1.88 m)	191 lb (87 kg)	So	St. Joseph's Prep	Mt. Laurel, NJ
F	23	Markell Lodge	6 ft 7 in (2.01 m)	210 lb (95 kg)	RS Fr	Christian Faith Center Academy	Creedmoor, NC
F	24	Pierfrancesco Oliva	6 ft 8 in (2.03 m)	207 lb (94 kg)	Fr	Bergen Catholic	Taranto, Italy
F	25	James Demery	6 ft 6 in (1.98 m)	197 lb (89 kg)	So	Northside Christian	Greenville, NC
F	32	Jai Williams	6 ft 9 in (2.06 m)	257 lb (117 kg)	RS So	Philadelphia Electrical & Technical Charter	Philadelphia, PA
F	33	Skylar Scrivano (W)	6 ft 10 in (2.08 m)	233 lb (106 kg)	RS Sr	Central Bucks East/Rider	Doylestown, PA
F	34	Javon Baumann	6 ft 8 in (2.03 m)	258 lb (117 kg)	RS Jr	Theodor-Heus School	Solms-Oberbiel, Germany
F	43	DeAndre' Bembry (C)	6 ft 6 in (1.98 m)	210 lb (95 kg)	Jr	The Patrick School	Charlotte, NC

Head coach

- Phil Martelli (Widener)

Assistant coach(es)

- Mark Bass (Saint Joseph's)
- David Duda (Spring Garden)
- Geoff Arnold (Saint Joseph's)

Legend

- (C) Team captain
- (S) Suspended
- (I) Ineligible
- (W) Walk-on
- Injured
- Current redshirt

Roster

== Schedule ==
Date time, TV	Rank^{#}	Opponent^{#}	Result	Record	Site (attendance) city, state
Regular season
11/13/2015*; 7:00 pm, WPHL		Drexel; City 6	W 82–81	1–0	Hagan Arena (4,200); Philadelphia, PA
11/15/2015*; 5:00 pm		Niagara; Hall of Fame Tip Off	W 73–62	2–0	Hagan Arena (3,486); Philadelphia, PA
11/18/2015*; 7:00 pm		Buffalo; Hall of Fame Tip Off	W 89–67	3–0	Hagan Arena (3,451); Philadelphia, PA
11/21/2015*; 2:30 pm, ESPN3		vs. Florida; Hall of Fame Tip Off semifinals	L 63–74	3–1	Mohegan Sun Arena; Uncasville, CT
11/22/2015*; 12:00 pm, ESPN3		vs. Old Dominion; Hall of Fame Tip Off 3rd place game	W 66–64	4–1	Mohegan Sun Arena (3,451); Uncasville, CT
12/01/2015*; 7:00 pm, CBSSN		No. 8 Villanova; Holy War	L 72–86	4–2	Hagan Arena (4,200); Philadelphia, PA
12/04/2015*; 7:00 pm		at Columbia	W 80–78	5–2	Levien Gymnasium (1,088); New York City, NY
12/08/2015*; 7:00 pm		Princeton	W 62–50	6–2	Hagan Arena (3,451); Philadelphia, PA
12/13/2015*; 4:00 pm, CBSSN		at Temple; Rivalry	W 66–65 ^{OT}	7–2	Liacouras Center (6,194); Philadelphia, PA
12/19/2015*; 2:00 pm, WPHL		Illinois State	W 79–65	8–2	Hagan Arena (3,516); Philadelphia, PA
12/22/2015*; 1:00 pm		vs. Virginia Tech; Atlantic 10/ACC Showcase	W 79–62	9–2	Barclays Center; Brooklyn, NY
12/29/2015*; 7:00 pm		Maryland Eastern Shore	W 78–68	10–2	Hagan Arena (3,721); Philadelphia, PA
01/02/2016; 12:30 pm, NBCSN		at Richmond	W 77–73	11–2 (1–0)	Robins Center (7,048); Richmond, VA
01/05/2016; 7:00 pm, ASN		VCU	L 82–85	11–3 (1–1)	Hagan Arena (3,752); Philadelphia, PA
01/10/2016; 12:00 pm, NBCSN		Rhode Island	W 72–67	12–3 (2–1)	Hagan Arena (4,080); Philadelphia, PA
01/13/2016; 7:00 pm		at George Mason	W 87–73	13–3 (3–1)	EagleBank Arena (3,044); Fairfax, VA
01/16/2016; 1:00 pm, WPHL		Fordham	W 80–55	14–3 (4–1)	Hagan Arena (4,200); Philadelphia, PA
01/20/2016*; 9:00 pm		at Penn	W 75–60	15–3	The Palestra (8,030); Philadelphia, PA
01/23/2016; 4:00 pm, ASN		at La Salle	W 69–48	16–3 (5–1)	Tom Gola Arena (3,021); Philadelphia, PA
01/27/2016; 7:00 pm		Massachusetts	W 78–70	17–3 (6–1)	Hagan Arena (3,856); Philadelphia, PA
01/30/2016; 6:00 pm, CBSSN		at Rhode Island	W 64–55	18–3 (7–1)	Ryan Center (6,907); Kingston, RI
02/03/2016; 7:00 pm		St. Bonaventure	L 73–83	18–4 (7–2)	Hagan Arena (4,027); Philadelphia, PA
02/06/2016; 2:00 pm		at Fordham	W 82–60	19–4 (8–2)	Rose Hill Gymnasium (3,200); Bronx, NY
02/10/2016; 7:00 pm		at George Washington	W 84–66	20–4 (9–2)	Charles E. Smith Center (3,091); Washington, D.C.
02/13/2016; 8:00 pm, ASN		La Salle	W 88–62	21–4 (10–2)	Hagan Arena (4,200); Philadelphia, PA
02/17/2016; 6:00 pm, CBSSN		No. 15 Dayton	W 79–70	22–4 (11–2)	Hagan Arena (4,200); Philadelphia, PA
02/20/2016; 2:00 pm, NBCSN		at Davidson	L 93–99	22–5 (11–3)	John M. Belk Arena (5,295); Davidson, NC
02/24/2016; 7:00 pm		at Massachusetts	W 74–57	23–5 (12–3)	Mullins Center; Amherst, MA
02/28/2016; 1:00 pm, ASN		Saint Louis	W 77–63	24–5 (13–3)	Hagan Arena (4,200); Philadelphia, PA
03/02/2016; 7:00 pm		vs. St. Bonaventure; Lightower Conference Classic	L 90–98	24–6 (13–4)	Blue Cross Arena (6,734); Rochester, NY
03/05/2016; 4:00 pm		Duquesne	L 70–78	24–7 (13–5)	Hagan Arena (4,200); Philadelphia, PA
Atlantic 10 tournament
03/11/2016; 2:30 pm, NBCSN	(4)	vs. (5) George Washington; Quarterfinals	W 86–80	25–7	Barclays Center (6,519); Brooklyn, NY
03/12/2016; 1:30 pm, CBSSN	(4)	vs. (1) Dayton; Semifinals	W 82–79	26–7	Barclays Center (8,223); Brooklyn, NY
03/13/2016; 12:30 pm, CBS	(4)	vs. (2) VCU; Championship	W 87–74	27–7	Barclays Center (8,413); Brooklyn, NY
NCAA tournament
03/18/2016*; 9:57 pm, truTV	(8 W)	vs. (9 W) Cincinnati; First Round	W 78–76	28–7	Spokane Veterans Memorial Arena (11,274); Spokane, WA
03/20/2016*; 9:40 pm, TBS	(8 W)	vs. (1 W) No. 5 Oregon; Second Round	L 64–69	28–8	Spokane Veterans Memorial Arena (11,296); Spokane, WA
*Non-conference game. ^{#}Rankings from AP Poll. (#) Tournament seedings in parentheses. W=West Region. All times are in Eastern Time.

== Rankings ==
Ranking movement Legend: ██ Increase in ranking. ██ Decrease in ranking. (RV) Received votes but unranked. (NR) Not ranked.
Poll	Pre	Wk 2	Wk 3	Wk 4	Wk 5	Wk 6	Wk 7	Wk 8	Wk 9	Wk 10	Wk 11	Wk 12	Wk 13	Wk 14	Wk 15	Wk 16	Wk 17	Wk 18	Wk 19	Final
AP													RV	RV	RV				RV	*N/A
Coaches												RV	RV	RV	RV	RV			25	RV

*AP does not release post-NCAA tournament rankings
