= 2015–16 Saint Louis Billikens men's basketball team =

American college basketball season

2015–16 Saint Louis Billikens men's basketball
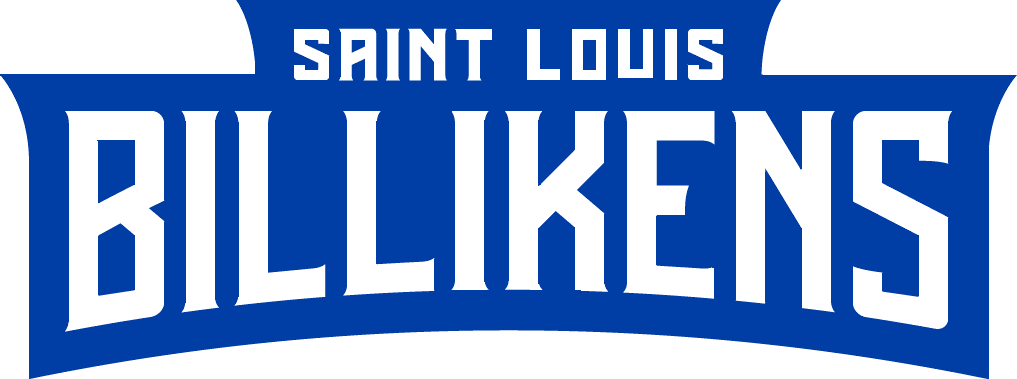
- Conference: Atlantic 10 Conference
- Record: 11–21 (5–13 A-10)
- Head coach: Jim Crews (4th season)
- Assistant coaches: Tanner Bronson; Calbert Cheaney; Jim Platt
- Home arena: Chaifetz Arena

2015–16 Atlantic 10 men's basketball standings
	Conf.				Overall
Team	W		L	PCT	W		L	PCT
Dayton	14	–	4	.778	25	–	8	.758
VCU	14	–	4	.778	25	–	11	.694
St. Bonaventure	14	–	4	.778	22	–	9	.710
Saint Joseph's †	13	–	5	.722	28	–	8	.778
George Washington	11	–	7	.611	28	–	10	.737
Davidson	10	–	8	.556	20	–	13	.606
Rhode Island	9	–	9	.500	17	–	15	.531
Fordham	8	–	10	.444	17	–	14	.548
Richmond	7	–	11	.389	16	–	16	.500
UMass	6	–	12	.333	14	–	18	.438
Duquesne	6	–	12	.333	17	–	17	.500
George Mason	5	–	13	.278	11	–	21	.344
Saint Louis	5	–	13	.278	11	–	21	.344
La Salle	4	–	14	.222	9	–	22	.290
† 2016 A10 Tournament winner

The 2015–16 Saint Louis Billikens men's basketball team represented Saint Louis University in the 2015–16 NCAA Division I men's basketball season. The Billikens were led by fourth year head coach Jim Crews. The team played their home games at Chaifetz Arena. They were a member of the Atlantic 10 Conference. They finished the season with an 11–22, 5–13 in A-10 play to finish in a tie for 12th place. They defeated George Mason in the first round of the A-10 tournament to advance to the second round where they lost to George Washington.

On March 10, following their exit in the A-10 tournament, head coach Jim Crews was released from his coaching duties by the school. He finished at Saint Louis with a four year record of 77–56.

== Previous season ==
The Billikens finished the season with an overall record of 11–21, with a record of 3–15 in the Atlantic 10 regular season to end up in the bottom of the Atlantic 10 standings. In the 2015 Atlantic 10 tournament, the Billikens lost to Duquesne in the first round.

== Off season ==
After a terrible 2014-2015 campaign, three of Saint Louis's top players (Grandy Glaze, Austin McBroom, and Tanner Lanconca) decided to leave the program and John Manning graduated from the University. With these four leaving the program Saint Louis lost 303 games of experience and 95 starts from the combined group. This marked a second consecutive year with massive turnover in the players in the program.

== Departures ==
Name	Number	Pos.	Height	Weight	Year	Hometown	Notes
Grandy Glaze	1	F	6'6"	235	Senior	Toronto, ON	Transferred to Grand Canyon
Austin McBroom	2	G	5'9"	165	RS Junior	North Hollywood, CA	Transferred to Eastern Washington
Stephen Leazer	12	G	6'4"	180	Freshman	Mt. Prospect, IL	Personal Reasons
Tanner Lancona	15	F	6'8"	230	Sophomore	Trabuco Canyon, CA	Transferred to Point Loma Nazarene
Grant Hollander	22	G	6'3"	175	Freshman	St. Charles, MO	Personal Reasons
Royce Simpson	33	G	6'2	180	Sophomore	Chicago, IL	Personal Reasons
John Manning	54	C	6'11	250	Senior	Chantilly, VA	Graduated

== Incoming recruits ==
College recruiting information
Name	Hometown	School	Height	Weight	Commit date
Elliot Welmer; PF	Columbus, IN	Brighton Academy	6 ft 9 in (2.06 m)	215 lb (98 kg)	Dec 4, 2013
Elliot Welmer; PF	Recruit ratings: Scout: Rivals: (73)				
Matt Neufeld; C	Victoria, British Columbia	Sunrise Christian Academy	6 ft 11 in (2.11 m)	220 lb (100 kg)	Oct 30, 2014
Matt Neufeld; C	Recruit ratings: Scout: Rivals: (NR)				
Jermaine Bishop; PG	Queens, NY	Holy Cross High School	6 ft 1 in (1.85 m)	170 lb (77 kg)	Mar 30, 2015
Jermaine Bishop; PG	Recruit ratings: Scout: Rivals: (62)				
Overall recruit ranking:
Note: In many cases, Scout, Rivals, 247Sports, On3, and ESPN may conflict in their listings of height and weight.; In these cases, the average was taken. ESPN grades are on a 100-point scale.; Sources: "2015 Team Ranking". Rivals.

== Roster ==
2015–16 Saint Louis Billikens men's basketball team
Players
Coaches

Pos.	#	Name	Height	Weight	Year	Previous school	Hometown
G	0	Marcus Bartley	6 ft 4 in (1.93 m)	180 lb (82 kg)	So	Douglas MacArthur	Decatur, IL
F	1	Milik Yarbrough	6 ft 6 in (1.98 m)	230 lb (104 kg)	So	Zion-Benton	Zion, IL
G	2	Miles Reynolds	6 ft 2 in (1.88 m)	170 lb (77 kg)	So	Whitney Young	Chicago, IL
G	3	Ash Yacoubou	6 ft 4 in (1.93 m)	215 lb (98 kg)	RS Sr	Long Island Lutheran; Villanova	Bronx, NY
G	5	Davell Roby	6 ft 4 in (1.93 m)	200 lb (91 kg)	So	White Station	Memphis, TN
G	10	Aaron Hines	6 ft 0 in (1.83 m)	175 lb (79 kg)	Jr	Parkway North; John Wood CC	St. Louis, MO
G	11	Jermaine Bishop	6 ft 1 in (1.85 m)	160 lb (73 kg)	Fr	Holy Cross	Queens, NY
C	13	Matt Neufeld	6 ft 11 in (2.11 m)	220 lb (100 kg)	Fr	Sunrise Christian	Victoria, BC
F	14	Brett Jolly	6 ft 9 in (2.06 m)	230 lb (104 kg)	So	Blair Academy	Southlake, TX
G	21	Markos Psimitis (W)	6 ft 5 in (1.96 m)	195 lb (88 kg)	RS So	Experimental; Harris-Stowe	Mytilene, Greece
G	24	Austin Eagleton (W)	6 ft 3 in (1.91 m)	200 lb (91 kg)	Jr	Sacred Heart-Griffin	Springfield, IL
C	25	Austin Gillman	6 ft 10 in (2.08 m)	220 lb (100 kg)	So	Oakville	St. Louis, MO
G	32	Mike Crawford	6 ft 4 in (1.93 m)	200 lb (91 kg)	Jr	Tipton	Tipton, IN
F	33	Elliott Welmer (injured) (redshirt)	6 ft 9 in (2.06 m)	215 lb (98 kg)	Fr	Brighton Academy	Columbus, IN
F	35	Reggie Agbeko	6 ft 7 in (2.01 m)	240 lb (109 kg)	Jr	South Kent School	Buffalo, NY

Head coach

- Jim Crews (Indiana)

Assistant coach(es)

- Calbert Cheaney (Indiana)
- Tanner Bronson (Wisconsin)
- Jim Platt (Concordia–Chicago)

Legend

- (C) Team captain
- (S) Suspended
- (I) Ineligible
- (W) Walk-on
- Injured
- Current redshirt

Roster
Last update: 3-3-2016

== Schedule ==
Date time, TV	Rank^{#}	Opponent^{#}	Result	Record	Site (attendance) city, state
Exhibition
11/10/2015*; 7:00 pm		Missouri–Saint Louis	W 71–44	–	Chaifetz Arena; St. Louis, MO
Non-conference regular season
11/15/2015*; 4:00 pm, FSMW		Hartford; Brooklyn Hoops Holiday Invitational	W 85–68	1–0	Chaifetz Arena (6,068); St. Louis, MO
11/17/2015*; 7:00 pm, FSMW		at SIU Edwardsville	W 70–60	2–0	Vadalabene Center (3,931); Edwardsville, IL
11/21/2015*; 7:00 pm, FSMW+		St. Francis Brooklyn; Brooklyn Hoops Holiday Invitational	W 76–60	3–0	Chaifetz Arena (6,087); St. Louis, MO
11/24/2015*; 7:00 pm, FSMW		North Florida; Brooklyn Hoops Holiday Invitational	W 70–57	4–0	Chaifetz Arena (5,826); St. Louis, MO
11/28/2015*; 7:00 pm		vs. Louisville; Brooklyn Hoops Holiday Invitational	L 57–77	4–1	Barclays Center; Brooklyn, NY
12/02/2015*; 7:00 pm, FSMW		Morehead State	L 46–60	4–2	Chaifetz Arena (5,071); St. Louis, MO
12/05/2015*; 8:00 pm, ESPNU		Wichita State	L 58–63	4–3	Chaifetz Arena (8,458); St. Louis, MO
12/12/2015*; 7:00 pm		Alabama A&M	W 75–58	5–3	Chaifetz Arena (5,419); St. Louis, MO
12/16/2015*; 7:00 pm, FSMW		Tennessee–Martin	L 76–82	5–4	Chaifetz Arena (5,243); St. Louis, MO
12/19/2015*; 7:00 pm, FSMW		Indiana State	L 68–76	5–5	Chaifetz Arena (7,244); St. Louis, MO
12/21/2015*; 7:00 pm, FSMW		Southern Illinois	L 52–65	5–6	Chaifetz Arena (8,758); St. Louis, MO
12/29/2015*; 7:00 pm, FSMW		at Kansas State	L 47–75	5–7	Bramlage Coliseum (12,528); Manhattan, KS
Atlantic 10 regular season
01/02/2016; 3:30 pm, NBCSN		at Rhode Island	L 57–85	5–8 (0–1)	Ryan Center (4,517); Kingston, RI
01/06/2016; 6:00 pm, FSMW		George Washington	W 65–62	6–8 (1–1)	Chaifetz Arena (5,104); St. Louis, MO
01/10/2016; 3:00 pm, NBCSN		VCU	W 72–56	6–9 (1–2)	Chaifetz Arena (8,719); St. Louis, MO
01/13/2016; 6:00 pm		at Duquesne	L 71–81	6–10 (1–3)	Palumbo Center (1,506); Pittsburgh, PA
01/17/2016; 2:00 pm, NBCSN		George Mason	L 79–92	6–11 (1–4)	Chaifetz Arena (7,022); St. Louis, MO
01/20/2016; 7:00 pm, FSMW		Davidson	W 96–87	7–11 (2–4)	Chaifetz Arena (5,103); St. Louis, MO
01/23/2016; 11:00 am		at Massachusetts	W 86–75	8–11 (3–4)	Mullins Center (3,484); Amherst, MA
01/27/2016; 6:00 pm, FSMW		at Dayton	L 37–73	8–12 (3–5)	UD Arena (13,455); Dayton, OH
01/30/2016; 5:00 pm, ASN		Duquesne	L 67–78	8–13 (3–6)	Chaifetz Arena (8,412); St. Louis, MO
02/07/2016; 1:00 pm, NBCSN		at St. Bonaventure	L 62–65	8–14 (3–7)	Reilly Center (3,712); Olean, NY
02/10/2016; 7:00 pm, FSMW		Richmond	L 53–67	8–15 (3–8)	Chaifetz Arena (5,154); St. Louis, MO
02/13/2016; 5:00 pm, CBSSN		at VCU	L 52–85	8–16 (3–9)	Siegel Center (7,637); Richmond, VA
02/17/2016; 6:00 pm		at George Mason	W 79–77 ^{OT}	9–16 (4–9)	EagleBank Arena (3,015); Fairfax, VA
02/20/2016; 7:00 pm, ASN		Fordham	W 76–68	10–16 (5–9)	Chaifetz Arena (8,591); St. Louis, MO
02/23/2016; 7:00 pm, CBSSN		Dayton	L 49-52 ^{OT}	10-17 (5-10)	Chaifetz Arena (7,541); St. Louis, MO
02/28/2016; 12:00 pm, ASN		at Saint Joseph's	L 63-77	10-18 (5-11)	Hagan Arena (4,200); Philadelphia, PA
03/02/2016; 6:00 pm		at La Salle	L 68-76	10-19 (5-12)	Tom Gola Arena (1,612); Philadelphia, PA
03/05/2016; 7:00 pm, FSMW		St. Bonaventure	L 67–76	10–20 (5–13)	Chaifetz Arena (7,812); St. Louis, MO
Atlantic 10 tournament
03/09/2016; 5:30 pm, ASN	(13)	vs. (12) George Mason; First round	W 83–78	11–20	Barclays Center (5,523); Brooklyn, NY
03/10/2016; 1:30 pm, NBCSN	(13)	vs. (5) George Washington; Second Round	L 65–73	11–21	Barclays Center (6,519); Brooklyn, NY
*Non-conference game. ^{#}Rankings from AP Poll. (#) Tournament seedings in parentheses. All times are in Central Time.
