= 2015–16 UMass Minutemen basketball team =

American college basketball season

2015–16 UMass Minutemen basketball
- Conference: Atlantic 10 Conference
- Record: 14–18 (6–12 A-10)
- Head coach: Derek Kellogg (8th season)
- Assistant coaches: Adam Ginsburg; Shyrone Chatman; Andy Allison
- Home arena: William D. Mullins Memorial Center

2015–16 Atlantic 10 men's basketball standings
	Conf.				Overall
Team	W		L	PCT	W		L	PCT
Dayton	14	–	4	.778	25	–	8	.758
VCU	14	–	4	.778	25	–	11	.694
St. Bonaventure	14	–	4	.778	22	–	9	.710
Saint Joseph's †	13	–	5	.722	28	–	8	.778
George Washington	11	–	7	.611	28	–	10	.737
Davidson	10	–	8	.556	20	–	13	.606
Rhode Island	9	–	9	.500	17	–	15	.531
Fordham	8	–	10	.444	17	–	14	.548
Richmond	7	–	11	.389	16	–	16	.500
UMass	6	–	12	.333	14	–	18	.438
Duquesne	6	–	12	.333	17	–	17	.500
George Mason	5	–	13	.278	11	–	21	.344
Saint Louis	5	–	13	.278	11	–	21	.344
La Salle	4	–	14	.222	9	–	22	.290
† 2016 A10 Tournament winner

The 2015–16 UMass Minutemen basketball team represented the University of Massachusetts Amherst during the 2015–16 NCAA Division I men's basketball season. The Minutemen, led by eighth year head coach Derek Kellogg, played their home games at the William D. Mullins Memorial Center and were members of the Atlantic 10 Conference. They finished the season 14–18, 6–12 in A-10 play to finish in a tie for tenth place. They defeated Rhode Island in the second round of the A-10 tournament to advance to the quarterfinals where they lost to VCU.

== Previous season ==
The Minutemen finished the 2014–15 season 17–15, 10–8 in A-10 play to finish in a three-way tie for sixth place. They lost in the second round of the A-10 tournament to La Salle.

== Departures ==
Name	Number	Pos.	Height	Weight	Year	Hometown	Notes
Maxie Esho	1	F	6'8"	215	RS Senior	Upper Marlboro, MD	Graduated
Derrick Gordon	2	G	6'3"	205	RS Junior	Plainfield, NJ	Graduate transferred to Seton Hall
Mike Wojewodzic	20	G	6'4"	215	Junior	Boston, MA	Walk-on; didn't return
Demetrius Dyson	22	G	6'5"	200	Sophomore	Covington, TN	Transferred to Samford
Cady Lalanne	25	C	6'10"	253	Senior	Orlando, FL	Graduated

=== Incoming transfers ===
Name	Number	Pos.	Height	Weight	Year	Hometown	Previous School
Zach Lewis	1	G	6'3"	175	Junior	Windsor, CT	Transferred from Canisius. Under NCAA transfer rules, Lewis will have to sit out for the 2015–16 season. Will have two years of remaining eligibility.
Antwan Space	3	F	6'8"	229	RS Senior	DeSoto, TX	Transferred from Texas A&M. Will be eligible to play immediately since Space graduated from Texas A&M.

== Incoming recruits ==
College recruiting information
Name	Hometown	School	Height	Weight	Commit date
Luwane Pipkins; PG	Chicago, IL	Bogan High School	5 ft 11 in (1.80 m)	160 lb (73 kg)	May 6, 2014
Luwane Pipkins; PG	Recruit ratings: Scout: Rivals: (80)				
Overall recruit ranking:
Note: In many cases, Scout, Rivals, 247Sports, On3, and ESPN may conflict in their listings of height and weight.; In these cases, the average was taken. ESPN grades are on a 100-point scale.; Sources: "2015 Team Ranking". Rivals.

=== Recruiting Class of 2016 ===
College recruiting information (2016)
Name	Hometown	School	Height	Weight	Commit date
Unique McLean; SG	Granby, MA	The MacDuffie School	6 ft 1 in (1.85 m)	170 lb (77 kg)	Jun 8, 2015
Unique McLean; SG	Recruit ratings: Scout: Rivals: (69)				
Overall recruit ranking:
Note: In many cases, Scout, Rivals, 247Sports, On3, and ESPN may conflict in their listings of height and weight.; In these cases, the average was taken. ESPN grades are on a 100-point scale.; Sources: "2015 Team Ranking". Rivals.

== Roster ==
2015–16 UMass Minutemen men's basketball team
Players
Coaches

Pos.	#	Name	Height	Weight	Year	Previous school	Hometown
G	0	Donte Clark	6 ft 4 in (1.93 m)	180 lb (82 kg)	So	Queen’s Grant HS	Chatham, VA
G	1	Zach Lewis (I) (redshirt)	6 ft 3 in (1.91 m)	180 lb (82 kg)	Jr	NW Catholic HS; Canisius	Windsor, CT
G	2	Luwane Pipkins	5 ft 10 in (1.78 m)	165 lb (75 kg)	Fr	Bogan HS	Chicago, IL
F	3	Antwan Space	6 ft 9 in (2.06 m)	235 lb (107 kg)	RS Sr	DeSoto HS; Texas A&M	DeSoto, TX
G	5	Jabarie Hinds	5 ft 11 in (1.8 m)	185 lb (84 kg)	RS Sr	Mount Vernon HS; West Virginia	Mount Vernon, NY
F	10	Malik Hines	6 ft 9 in (2.06 m)	240 lb (109 kg)	Fr	Murrah HS	Jackson, MS
G	12	Trey Davis	6 ft 0 in (1.83 m)	185 lb (84 kg)	Sr	Woodrow Wilson HS	DeSoto, TX
F	13	Zach Coleman	6 ft 7 in (2.01 m)	200 lb (91 kg)	RS So	Woodrow Wilson HS	Dallas, TX
C	22	Tyler Bergantino	6 ft 9 in (2.06 m)	250 lb (113 kg)	Sr	Nature Coast Technical HS	Spring Hill, FL
G	23	C. J. Anderson	6 ft 5 in (1.96 m)	175 lb (79 kg)	So	Whitehaven HS	Memphis, TN
F	24	Seth Berger	6 ft 7 in (2.01 m)	210 lb (95 kg)	Jr	Ballard HS	Seattle, WA
C	45	Rashaan Holloway	6 ft 10 in (2.08 m)	280 lb (127 kg)	Fr	Schalick HS	Elmer, NJ
F	55	Zach Turcotte (W)	6 ft 7 in (2.01 m)	210 lb (95 kg)	Jr	Masconomet Regional HS	Boxford, MA

Head coach

- Derek Kellogg (UMass)

Assistant coach(es)

- Adam Ginsburg (Buffalo)
- Shyrone Chatman (Memphis)
- Andy Allison (Youngstown State)

Legend

- (C) Team captain
- (S) Suspended
- (I) Ineligible
- (W) Walk-on
- Injured
- Current redshirt

Roster

== Schedule ==
Date time, TV	Rank^{#}	Opponent^{#}	Result	Record	Site (attendance) city, state
Non-conference regular Season
Nov 15, 2015*; 12:00 pm		Howard; Men Who Speak Up Main Event	W 85–79	1–0	Mullins Center (3,188); Amherst, MA
Nov 17, 2015*; 7:00 pm		at Harvard	W 69–63	2–0	Lavietes Pavilion (2,195); Cambridge, MA
Nov 19, 2015*; 7:00 pm		Central Arkansas; Men Who Speak Up Main Event	W 89–62	3–0	Mullins Center (3,158); Amherst, MA
Nov 23, 2015*; 9:30 pm, YouTube		vs. Clemson; Men Who Speak Up Main Event Heavyweight semifinals	W 82–65	4–0	MGM Grand Garden Arena; Paradise, NV
Nov 25, 2015*; 9:30 pm, ESPN2		vs. Creighton; Men Who Speak Up Main Event Heavyweight final	L 76–97	4–1	MGM Grand Garden Arena (1,623); Paradise, NV
Dec 2, 2015*; 7:00 pm		Boston University	W 99–69	5–1	Mullins Center (3,818); Amherst, MA
Dec 5, 2015*; 4:00 pm, NBCSN		vs. Ole Miss; Hall of Fame Holiday Classic	L 64–74	5–2	MassMutual Center (3,765); Springfield, MA
Dec 8, 2015*; 7:00 pm, ESPN3		at UCF	L 63–67	5–3	CFE Arena (4,395); Orlando, FL
Dec 13, 2015*; 1:30 pm, ESPN3		at Florida Gulf Coast	L 76–77	5–4	Alico Arena (3,049); Fort Myers, FL
Dec 16, 2015*; 7:00 pm		New Orleans	W 103–95 ^{OT}	6–4	Mullins Center (4,273); Amherst, MA
Dec 21, 2015*; 7:00 pm, CBSSN		No. 10 Providence	L 66–90	6–5	Mullins Center (4,411); Amherst, MA
Dec 29, 2015*; 7:00 pm		LIU Brooklyn	W 83-79	7-5	Mullins Center (3,019); Amherst, MA
Atlantic 10 regular Season
Jan 3, 2016; 5:00 pm, NBCSN		at La Salle	W 74–67	8–5 (1–0)	Tom Gola Arena (1,525); Philadelphia, PA
Jan 6, 2016; 8:00 pm, CBSSN		at No. 25 Dayton	L 63–93	8–6 (1–1)	UD Arena (12,237); Dayton, OH
Jan 9, 2016; 12:00 pm, CBSSN		St. Bonaventure	L 77–88	8–7 (1–2)	Mullins Center (4,224); Amherst, MA
Jan 12, 2016; 7:00 pm, ASN		George Washington	L 70–81	8–8 (1–3)	Mullins Center (2,571); Amherst, MA
Jan 16, 2016; 12:30 pm, NBCSN		at Davidson	L 74–86	8–9 (1–4)	John M. Belk Arena (5,069); Davidson, NC
Jan 23, 2016; 12:00 pm		Saint Louis	L 75–86	8–10 (1–5)	Mullins Center (3,484); Amherst, MA
Jan 27, 2016; 7:00 pm		at Saint Joseph's	L 70–78	8–11 (1–6)	Hagan Arena (3,856); Philadelphia, PA
Jan 30, 2016; 12:00 pm, NBCSN		Fordham	L 72–78 ^{OT}	8–12 (1–7)	Mullins Center (3,562); Amherst, MA
Feb 2, 2016; 7:00 pm, ASN		Rhode Island	W 61–56	9–12 (2–7)	Mullins Center (2,423); Amherst, MA
Feb 6, 2016; 6:00 pm		at Richmond	L 53–69	9–13 (2–8)	Robins Center (7,201); Richmond, VA
Feb 11, 2016; 7:00 pm, ESPNU		VCU	W 69–63	10–13 (3–8)	Mullins Center (2,698); Amherst, MA
Feb 14, 2016; 3:00 pm, ASN		at Duquesne	W 108–99 ^{OT}	11–13 (4–8)	Palumbo Center (2,364); Pittsburgh, PA
Feb 17, 2016; 7:00 pm, ASN		at Fordham	L 66–76	11–14 (4–9)	Rose Hill Gymnasium (2,341); Bronx, NY
Feb 21, 2016; 4:00 pm, NBCSN		George Mason	W 70–64	12–14 (5–9)	Mullins Center (3,691); Amherst, MA
Feb 24, 2016; 7:00 pm		Saint Joseph's	L 57–74	12–15 (5–10)	Mullins Center (2,460); Amherst, MA
Feb 27, 2016; 4:00 pm		at St. Bonaventure	L 83–85	12–16 (5–11)	Reilly Center (5,294); Olean, NY
Mar 2, 2016; 7:00 pm, CBSSN		at Rhode Island	L 50–68	12–17 (5–12)	Ryan Center (5,113); Kingston, RI
Mar 5, 2016; 3:00 pm		La Salle	W 69–52	13–17 (6–12)	Mullins Center (3,096); Amherst, MA
Atlantic 10 tournament
Mar 10, 2016; 6:30 pm, NBCSN	(10)	vs. (7) Rhode Island; Second round	W 67–62	14–17	Barclays Center (5,507); Brooklyn, NY
Mar 11, 2016; 6:30 pm, NBCSN	(10)	vs. (2) VCU; Quarterfinals	L 70–85	14–18	Barclays Center (8,223); Brooklyn, NY
*Non-conference game. ^{#}Rankings from AP Poll / Coaches' Poll. (#) Tournament seedings in parentheses. All times are in Eastern.

== See also ==
- 2015–16 UMass Minutewomen basketball team
