= 2015–16 La Salle Explorers men's basketball team =

American college basketball season

2015–16 La Salle Explorers men's basketball
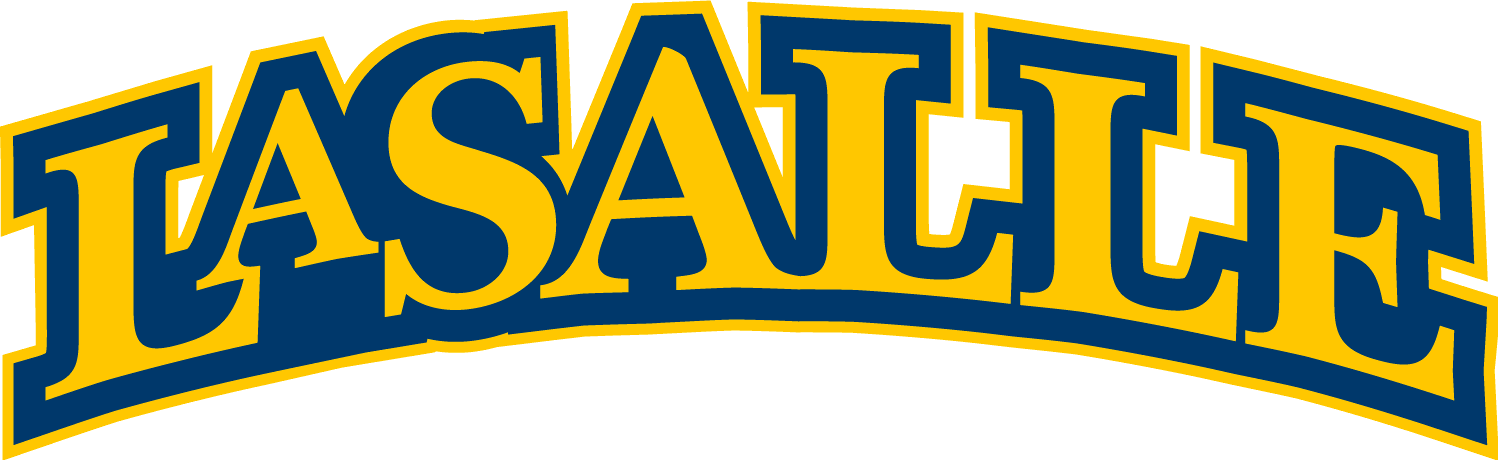
- Conference: Atlantic 10 Conference
- Record: 9–22 (4–14 A-10)
- Head coach: John Giannini (12th season)
- Assistant coaches: Horace Owens; Harris Adler; Will Bailey
- Home arena: Tom Gola Arena

2015–16 Atlantic 10 men's basketball standings
| | Conf. | | | | Overall |
| Team | W | | L | PCT | W | | L | PCT |
|---|---|---|---|---|---|---|---|---|
| Dayton | 14 | – | 4 | .778 | 25 | – | 8 | .758 |
| VCU | 14 | – | 4 | .778 | 25 | – | 11 | .694 |
| St. Bonaventure | 14 | – | 4 | .778 | 22 | – | 9 | .710 |
| Saint Joseph's † | 13 | – | 5 | .722 | 28 | – | 8 | .778 |
| George Washington | 11 | – | 7 | .611 | 28 | – | 10 | .737 |
| Davidson | 10 | – | 8 | .556 | 20 | – | 13 | .606 |
| Rhode Island | 9 | – | 9 | .500 | 17 | – | 15 | .531 |
| Fordham | 8 | – | 10 | .444 | 17 | – | 14 | .548 |
| Richmond | 7 | – | 11 | .389 | 16 | – | 16 | .500 |
| UMass | 6 | – | 12 | .333 | 14 | – | 18 | .438 |
| Duquesne | 6 | – | 12 | .333 | 17 | – | 17 | .500 |
| George Mason | 5 | – | 13 | .278 | 11 | – | 21 | .344 |
| Saint Louis | 5 | – | 13 | .278 | 11 | – | 21 | .344 |
| La Salle | 4 | – | 14 | .222 | 9 | – | 22 | .290 |
† 2016 A10 Tournament winner

The 2015–16 La Salle Explorers basketball team represented La Salle University during the 2015–16 NCAA Division I men's basketball season. The Explorers, led by 12th year head coach John Giannini, played their home games at Tom Gola Arena and were members of the Atlantic 10 Conference. They finished the season 9–22, 4–14 in A-10 play to finish in last place. They defeated Duquesne in the first round of the A-10 tournament to advance to the second round where they lost to Davidson.

== Previous season ==
The Explorers finished the season 17–16, 8–10 in A-10 play to finish in ninth place. They advanced to the quarterfinals of the A-10 tournament where they lost to Davidson.

== Departures ==
| Name | Number | Pos. | Height | Weight | Year | Hometown | Notes |
|---|---|---|---|---|---|---|---|
| Stephen Zack | 0 | C | 6'11" | 240 | Senior | New Cumberland, PA | Graduated |
| D. J. Peterson | 1 | G | 6'6" | 195 | Senior | Burnsville, MN | Graduated |
| Khalid Lewis | 23 | G | 6'3" | 185 | RS Junior | Trenton, NJ | Transferred to Illinois |
| Jerrell Wright | 25 | F | 6'8" | 245 | Senior | Philadelphia, PA | Graduated |
| Jermaine Davis | 30 | C | 6'9" | 295 | RS Sophomore | Garfield Heights, OH | Transferred to Texas Southern |

=== Incoming transfers ===
| Name | Number | Pos. | Height | Weight | Year | Hometown | Previous School |
|---|---|---|---|---|---|---|---|
| Demetrius Henry | | F/C | 6'9" | 227 | Junior | Miami, FL | South Carolina. |
| B. J. Johnson | | F | 6'6" | 175 | Junior | Ardmore, PA | Syracuse. |
| Pookie Powell | | G | 6'1" | 180 | Sophomore | Orlando, FL | Memphis. |

- Under NCAA transfer rules, Henry, Johnson and Powell will have to sit out for the 2015–16 season. Henry and Johnson will have two years of remaining eligibility entering the 2016–17 season, and Powell will have three.

== Recruiting ==
College recruiting information
| Name | Hometown | School | Height | Weight | Commit date |
|---|---|---|---|---|---|
| Karl Harris; SG | Hazel Crest, IL | De La Salle Institute | 6 ft 4 in (1.93 m) | 170 lb (77 kg) | Oct 18, 2014 |
| Karl Harris; SG | Recruit ratings: Scout: Rivals: (NR) | | | | |
| Rokas Ulvydas; PG | Baltimore, MD | Mount Zion Baptist Christian School | 6 ft 11 in (2.11 m) | 220 lb (100 kg) | Mar 18, 2015 |
| Rokas Ulvydas; PG | Recruit ratings: Scout: Rivals: (NR) | | | | |
Overall recruit ranking:
Note: In many cases, Scout, Rivals, 247Sports, On3, and ESPN may conflict in their listings of height and weight.; In these cases, the average was taken. ESPN grades are on a 100-point scale.; Sources: "2015 Team Ranking". Rivals.

== Roster ==
2015–16 La Salle Explorers men's basketball team
Players
Coaches

| Pos. | # | Name | Height | Weight | Year | Hometown |
|---|---|---|---|---|---|---|
| G | 1 | Johnnie Shuler | 5 ft 11 in (1.8 m) | 170 lb (77 kg) | So | Washington, D.C. |
| G | 2 | Amar Stukes | 6 ft 2 in (1.88 m) | 185 lb (84 kg) | RS So | Philadelphia, PA |
| G | 3 | Cleon Roberts | 6 ft 6 in (1.98 m) | 180 lb (82 kg) | RS Jr | Miami, FL |
| G | 4 | Hank Davis (W) | 5 ft 11 in (1.8 m) | 165 lb (75 kg) | Jr | Cherry Hill, NJ |
| F/C | 5 | Tony Washington | 6 ft 10 in (2.08 m) | 220 lb (100 kg) | RS So | Detroit, MI |
| G | 11 | O. J. Lewis (W) | 6 ft 0 in (1.83 m) | 180 lb (82 kg) | Sr | Mitchellville, MD |
| F | 12 | Yevgen Sakhniuk | 6 ft 7 in (2.01 m) | 235 lb (107 kg) | So | Kyiv, Ukraine |
| G | 14 | Karl Harris | 6 ft 5 in (1.96 m) | 170 lb (77 kg) | Fr | Hazel Crest, IL |
| G | 21 | Jordan Price | 6 ft 5 in (1.96 m) | 230 lb (104 kg) | RS Jr | Decatur, GA |
| G | 23 | Dusan Majstorovic | 6 ft 5 in (1.96 m) | 195 lb (88 kg) | Fr | Novi Sad, Serbia |
| G/F | 35 | Rohan Brown | 6 ft 6 in (1.98 m) | 215 lb (98 kg) | RS Sr | Hartford, CT |
| F/C | | Demetrius Henry (I) (redshirt) | 6 ft 9 in (2.06 m) | 225 lb (102 kg) | Jr | Miami, FL |
| G/F | | B. J. Johnson (I) (redshirt) | 6 ft 7 in (2.01 m) | 185 lb (84 kg) | Jr | Philadelphia, PA |
| G | | Pookie Powell (I) (redshirt) | 6 ft 0 in (1.83 m) | 185 lb (84 kg) | So | Orlando, FL |

Head coach

- John Giannini (North Central (IL))

Assistant coach(es)

- Horace Owens (Rhode Island)
- Harris Adler (USciences)
- Will Bailey (UAB)

Legend

- (C) Team captain
- (S) Suspended
- (I) Ineligible
- (W) Walk-on
- Injured
- Current redshirt

Roster

== Schedule ==
| Date time, TV | Rank^{#} | Opponent^{#} | Result | Record | Site (attendance) city, state |
Exhibition
| November 7, 2015*; 2:00 pm | | Philadelphia | L 78–79 | 0–1 | Tom Gola Arena; Philadelphia, PA |
Non-conference regular season
| November 14, 2015*; 3:00 pm | | Towson | W 78–76 | 1–0 | Tom Gola Arena (3,400); Philadelphia, PA |
| November 17, 2015*; 7:00 pm | | Rider | W 73–60 | 2–0 | Tom Gola Arena (1,611); Philadelphia, PA |
| November 23, 2015*; 7:00 pm | | Lafayette | W 83–75 | 3–0 | Tom Gola Arena (1,678); Philadelphia, PA |
| November 25, 2015*; 7:00 pm | | at Penn | L 64–80 | 3–1 | The Palestra (3,122); Philadelphia, PA |
| November 28, 2015*; 3:00 pm | | at Rowan | W 81–51 | 4–1 | Esbjornson Gymnasium (1,150); Glassboro, NJ |
| December 2, 2015*; 7:00 pm | | Hofstra | L 80–84 | 4–2 | Tom Gola Arena (1,712); Philadelphia, PA |
| December 5, 2015*; 2:00 pm | | Drexel | L 53–66 | 4–3 | Tom Gola Arena (2,004); Philadelphia, PA |
| December 13, 2015*; 5:00 pm, FS1 | | at No. 9 Villanova | L 47–76 | 4–4 | The Pavilion (6,500); Villanova, PA |
| December 22, 2015*; 5:00 pm, CBSSN | | vs. No. 13 Miami (FL) | L 49–95 | 4–5 | Palestra (3,582); Philadelphia, PA |
| December 31, 2015*; 1:30 pm, ESPN3 | | at Florida Gulf Coast | L 77–86 | 4–6 | Alico Arena (3,084); Fort Myers, FL |
Atlantic 10 regular season
| January 3, 2016; 5:00 pm, NBCSN | | Massachusetts | L 67–74 | 4–7 (0–1) | Tom Gola Arena (1,525); Philadelphia, PA |
| January 6, 2016; 7:00 pm | | at Fordham | L 61–66 | 4–8 (0–2) | Rose Hill Gymnasium (1,024); Bronx, NY |
| January 9, 2016; 2:00 pm | | No. 25 Dayton | W 61–57 | 5–8 (1–2) | Tom Gola Arena (2,711); Philadelphia, PA |
| January 13, 2016; 7:00 pm | | at Richmond | L 61–83 | 5–9 (1–3) | Robins Center (5,257); Richmond, VA |
| January 16, 2016; 2:30 pm, NBCSN | | at Rhode Island | L 62–73 | 5–10 (1–4) | Ryan Center (3,872); Kingston, RI |
| January 20, 2016*; 7:00 pm, CBSSN | | vs. Temple | L 59–62 | 5–11 | The Palestra; Philadelphia, PA |
| January 23, 2016; 4:00 pm, ASN | | Saint Joseph's | L 48–69 | 5–12 (1–5) | Tom Gola Arena (3,021); Philadelphia, PA |
| January 26, 2016; 7:00 pm, ASN | | at Duquesne | L 60–87 | 5–13 (1–6) | Palumbo Center; Pittsburgh, PA |
| January 30, 2016; 2:00 pm, NBCSN | | at Dayton | L 44–59 | 5–14 (1–7) | UD Arena (13,455); Dayton, OH |
| February 3, 2016; 7:00 pm | | VCU | L 70–88 | 5–15 (1–8) | Tom Gola Arena (1,711); Philadelphia, PA |
| February 6, 2016; 8:00 pm, ASN | | Rhode Island | L 62–79 | 5–16 (1–9) | Tom Gola Arena (1,889); Philadelphia, PA |
| February 10, 2016; 7:00 pm | | at Davidson | L 66–79 | 5–17 (1–10) | John M. Belk Arena (3,585); Davidson, NC |
| February 13, 2016; 8:00 pm, ASN | | at Saint Joseph's | L 62–88 | 5–18 (1–11) | Hagan Arena (4,200); Philadelphia, PA |
| February 17, 2016; 7:00 pm | | St. Bonaventure | W 71–64 | 6–18 (2–11) | Tom Gola Arena (1,329); Philadelphia, PA |
| February 21, 2016; 12:00 pm, NBCSN | | at George Washington | L 50–90 | 6–19 (2–12) | Charles E. Smith Center (3,002); Washington, D.C. |
| February 24, 2016; 7:00 pm | | Fordham | L 53–56 | 6–20 (2–13) | Tom Gola Arena (1,350); Philadelphia, PA |
| February 27, 2016; 2:00 pm | | George Mason | W 76–68 | 7–20 (3–13) | Tom Gola Arena (2,721); Philadelphia, PA |
| March 2, 2016; 7:00 pm | | Saint Louis | W 76–68 | 8–20 (4–13) | Tom Gola Arena (1,612); Philadelphia, PA |
| March 5, 2016; 3:00 pm | | at Massachusetts | L 52–69 | 8–21 (4–14) | Mullins Center (3,096); Amherst, MA |
Atlantic 10 tournament
| March 9, 2016; 9:00 pm, ASN | (14) | vs. (11) Duquesne; First round | W 88–73 | 9–21 | Barclays Center (5,523); Brooklyn, NY |
| March 10, 2016; 9:00 pm, NBCSN | (14) | vs. (6) Davidson; Second round | L 63–78 | 9–22 | Barclays Center (5,507); Brooklyn, NY |
*Non-conference game. ^{#}Rankings from AP Poll. (#) Tournament seedings in parentheses. All times are in Eastern Time.

== See also ==
- 2015–16 La Salle Explorers women's basketball team
