= 2015–16 Davidson Wildcats men's basketball team =

American college basketball season

2015–16 Davidson Wildcats men's basketball

NIT, First Round
- Conference: Atlantic 10 Conference
- Record: 20–13 (10–8 A-10)
- Head coach: Bob McKillop (27th season)
- Assistant coaches: Matt McKillop (8th year); Ryan Mee (4th year); Will Reigel (2nd year); Will Thoni (2nd year)
- Home arena: John M. Belk Arena (5,295)

2015–16 Atlantic 10 men's basketball standings
	Conf.				Overall
Team	W		L	PCT	W		L	PCT
Dayton	14	–	4	.778	25	–	8	.758
VCU	14	–	4	.778	25	–	11	.694
St. Bonaventure	14	–	4	.778	22	–	9	.710
Saint Joseph's †	13	–	5	.722	28	–	8	.778
George Washington	11	–	7	.611	28	–	10	.737
Davidson	10	–	8	.556	20	–	13	.606
Rhode Island	9	–	9	.500	17	–	15	.531
Fordham	8	–	10	.444	17	–	14	.548
Richmond	7	–	11	.389	16	–	16	.500
UMass	6	–	12	.333	14	–	18	.438
Duquesne	6	–	12	.333	17	–	17	.500
George Mason	5	–	13	.278	11	–	21	.344
Saint Louis	5	–	13	.278	11	–	21	.344
La Salle	4	–	14	.222	9	–	22	.290
† 2016 A10 Tournament winner

The 2015–16 Davidson Wildcats men's basketball team representsed Davidson College during the 2015–16 NCAA Division I men's basketball season. The Wildcats, led by 27th year head coach Bob McKillop, played their home games at the John M. Belk Arena and were second year members of the Atlantic 10 Conference. Davidson finished the season with a record of 20–13, 10–8 record in A-10 play, finishing in sixth place. They lost to eventual tournament champion, Saint Joseph's, in the semifinals of the A-10 tournament. They received an invitation to the National Invitation Tournament where they lost in the first round to Florida State.

== Previous season ==
The Wildcats finished the 2014–15 season 24–8, 14–4 in A-10 play to win the regular season championship. They advanced to the semifinals of the A-10 tournament where they lost to VCU. They received an at-large bid to the NCAA tournament where they lost in the second round to Iowa.

== Departures ==
Name	Number	Pos.	Height	Weight	Year	Hometown	Notes
Tyler Kalinoski	4	G	6'4"	180	Senior	Overland Park, KS	Graduated
Ali Mackay	22	F	6'11"	215	Senior	North Berwick, Scotland	Graduated

=== Incoming transfers ===
Name	Number	Pos.	Height	Weight	Year	Hometown	Notes
Will Magarity	22	F	6'11"	240	Junior	Stockholm, Sweden	Transferred from Boston College. Under NCAA transfer rules, Magarity will have to sit out for the 2015–16 season. Will have two years of remaining eligibility.

== Incoming recruits ==
College recruiting information
Name	Hometown	School	Height	Weight	Commit date
KiShawn Pritchett; SF	Mooresville, NC	Lake Norman High School	6 ft 6 in (1.98 m)	220 lb (100 kg)	Aug 8, 2014
KiShawn Pritchett; SF	Recruit ratings: Scout: Rivals: (NR)				
Dusan Kovacevic; PF	Novi Sad, Serbia	Rabun Gap Nacoochee School	6 ft 10 in (2.08 m)	260 lb (120 kg)	Mar 16, 2015
Dusan Kovacevic; PF	Recruit ratings: Scout: Rivals: (NR)				
Overall recruit ranking:
Note: In many cases, Scout, Rivals, 247Sports, On3, and ESPN may conflict in their listings of height and weight.; In these cases, the average was taken. ESPN grades are on a 100-point scale.; Sources: "2015 Team Ranking". Rivals.

== Roster ==
2015–16 Davidson Wildcats men's basketball team
Players
Coaches

Pos.	#	Name	Height	Weight	Year	Hometown
F	0	Dusan Kovacevic	6 ft 10 in (2.08 m)	230 lb (104 kg)	Fr	Novi Sad, Serbia
F	1	Nathan Ekwu	6 ft 7 in (2.01 m)	235 lb (107 kg)	So	Enugu, Nigeria
G	2	Jordan Watkins	6 ft 1 in (1.85 m)	160 lb (73 kg)	So	Charlotte, North Carolina
G	3	Brian Sullivan	6 ft 0 in (1.83 m)	185 lb (84 kg)	Sr	Upper Arlington, Ohio
G	5	Jordan Barham	6 ft 5 in (1.96 m)	220 lb (100 kg)	Sr	Cleveland, Ohio
G	12	Jack Gibbs	6 ft 0 in (1.83 m)	195 lb (88 kg)	Jr	Westerville, Ohio
G	13	Kamau Faines (W)	6 ft 2 in (1.88 m)	195 lb (88 kg)	So	Chicago, IL
G	14	Matt Williams (W)	6 ft 1 in (1.85 m)	195 lb (88 kg)	Sr	Cary, North Carolina
F	15	Oskar Michelsen	6 ft 9 in (2.06 m)	210 lb (95 kg)	So	Helsinki, Finland
G	20	KiShawn Pritchett	6 ft 6 in (1.98 m)	220 lb (100 kg)	Fr	Mooresville, North Carolina
F	22	Will Magarity (I) (redshirt)	6 ft 11 in (2.11 m)	240 lb (109 kg)	Jr	Stockholm, Sweden
F	23	Peyton Aldridge	6 ft 8 in (2.03 m)	205 lb (93 kg)	So	Warren, Ohio
F	25	Jake Belford	6 ft 9 in (2.06 m)	220 lb (100 kg)	RS Jr	Battle Ground, Washington
G	31	Manu Giamoukis	6 ft 1 in (1.85 m)	180 lb (82 kg)	Jr	Thessaloniki, Greece
G	32	Rusty Reigel	6 ft 2 in (1.88 m)	190 lb (86 kg)	So	Charlotte, North Carolina
F	34	Connor Perkey	6 ft 8 in (2.03 m)	215 lb (98 kg)	Sr	Atlanta, Georgia
F	40	Andrew McAuliffe	6 ft 8 in (2.03 m)	235 lb (107 kg)	Jr	Northbrook, Illinois

Head coach

- Bob McKillop (Hofstra)

Assistant coach(es)

- Matt McKillop (Davidson)
- Ryan Mee (Rochester)
- Will Reigel (Davidson)

Legend

- (C) Team captain
- (S) Suspended
- (I) Ineligible
- (W) Walk-on
- Injured
- Current redshirt

Roster

== Schedule ==
Date time, TV	Rank^{#}	Opponent^{#}	Result	Record	Site (attendance) city, state
Exhibition
11/07/2015*; 2:00 pm		Lenoir–Rhyne	W 96–64		John M. Belk Arena (3,542); Davidson, NC
Non-conference regular season
11/14/2015*; 7:30 pm, MI-Ch 4		UCF	W 90–85	1–0	John M. Belk Arena (4,676); Davidson, NC
11/21/2015*; 1:00 pm, MI-Ch 4		College of Charleston	W 82–81	2–0	John M. Belk Arena (4,478); Davidson, NC
11/23/2015*; 7:00 pm, MI-Ch 4		Mercer	W 77–71	3–0	John M. Belk Arena (3,861); Davidson, NC
11/28/2015*; 2:00 pm, MI-Ch 4		Denison	W 83–70	4–0	John M. Belk Arena (3,629); Davidson, NC
12/01/2015*; 7:00 pm		at Charlotte	W 109–74	5–0	Dale F. Halton Arena (7,571); Charlotte, NC
12/06/2015*; 6:00 pm, ESPNU		at No. 9 North Carolina	L 65–98	5–1	Dean Smith Center (14,805); Chapel Hill, NC
12/09/2015*; 8:30 pm, MI-Ch 4		Eastern Washington; Gotham Classic	W 96–86	6–1	John M. Belk Arena (3,714); Davidson, NC
12/12/2015*; 7:00 pm, MI-Ch 4		Western Carolina; Gotham Classic	W 87–54	7–1	John M. Belk Arena (4,068); Davidson, NC
12/20/2015*; 12:00 pm, ESPNU		vs. Pittsburgh; Gotham Classic	L 69–94	7–2	Madison Square Garden (7,345); New York City, NY
12/23/2015*; 1:00 pm, MI-Ch 4		Morehead State	W 81–77	8–2	John M. Belk Arena (4,561); Davidson, NC
12/28/2015*; 9:00 pm, P12N		at California	L 60–86	8–3	Haas Pavilion (10,384); Berkeley, CA
Atlantic 10 regular season
01/02/2016; 8:00 pm, ASN		at St. Bonaventure	L 85–97	8–4 (0–1)	Reilly Center (3,783); Olean, NY
01/06/2016; 7:00 pm, WMYT		Duquesne	W 77–66	9–4 (1–1)	John M. Belk Arena (3,321); Davidson, NC
01/09/2016; 7:00 pm, WMYT		George Mason	W 81–75	10–4 (2–1)	John M. Belk Arena (4,158); Davidson, NC
01/12/2016; 8:00 pm, CBSSN		at Dayton	L 74–80	10–5 (2–2)	UD Arena (12,310); Dayton, OH
01/16/2016; 12:30 pm, NBCSN		Massachusetts	W 86–74	11–5 (3–2)	John M. Belk Arena (5,069); Davidson, NC
01/20/2016; 8:00 pm		at Saint Louis	L 87–96	11–6 (3–3)	Chaifetz Arena (5,103); St. Louis, MO
01/25/2016; 7:00 pm, NBCSN		at Richmond	W 78–70	12–6 (4–3)	Robins Center (6,570); Richmond, VA
01/29/2016; 6:00 pm, ESPN2		VCU	L 69–79	12–7 (4–4)	John M. Belk Arena (5,295); Davidson, NC
02/03/2016; 7:00 pm, ASN		at George Washington	L 69–79	12–8 (4–5)	Charles E. Smith Center (2,918); Washington, D.C.
02/06/2016; 12:30 pm, NBCSN		at Duquesne	W 93–82	13–8 (5–5)	Palumbo Center (3,382); Pittsburgh, PA
02/10/2016; 7:00 pm, WMYT		La Salle	W 79–66	14–8 (6–5)	John M. Belk Arena (3,585); Davidson, NC
02/13/2016; 4:00 pm		at George Mason	L 59–60	14–9 (6–6)	EagleBank Arena (6,327); Fairfax, VA
02/16/2016; 7:00 pm, ASN		Richmond	W 83–79	15–9 (7–6)	John M. Belk Arena (3,832); Davidson, NC
02/20/2016; 2:00 pm, NBCSN		Saint Joseph's	W 99–93	16–9 (8–6)	John M. Belk Arena (5,295); Davidson, NC
02/23/2016; 6:00 pm, CBSSN		Rhode Island	W 65–54	17–9 (9–6)	John M. Belk Arena (4,064); Davidson, NC
02/27/2016; 2:00 pm		at Fordham	L 82–91	17–10 (9–7)	Rose Hill Gymnasium (2,985); Bronx, NY
03/02/2016; 7:00 pm, CBSSN		at VCU	L 60–70	17–11 (9–8)	Siegel Center (7,637); Richmond, VA
03/05/2016; 3:30 pm, NBCSN		George Washington	W 87–80	18–11 (10–8)	John M. Belk Arena (5,157); Davidson, NC
Atlantic 10 tournament
03/10/2016; 9:00 pm, NBCSN	(6)	vs. (14) LaSalle; Second Round	W 78–63	19–11	Barclays Center (5,507); Brooklyn, NY
03/11/2016; 9:00 pm, NBCSN	(6)	vs. (3) St. Bonaventure; Quarterfinals	W 90–86 ^{OT}	20–11	Barclays Center (8,223); Brooklyn, NY
03/12/2016; 4:00 pm, CBSSN	(6)	vs. (2) VCU; Semifinals	L 54–76	20–12	Barclays Center (10,439); Brooklyn, NY
NIT
03/15/2016*; 7:00 pm, ESPN2	(5)	at (4) Florida State; First Round - Valparaiso Quadrant	L 74–84	20–13	Donald L. Tucker Center (2,496); Tallahassee, FL
*Non-conference game. ^{#}Rankings from AP Poll. (#) Tournament seedings in parentheses. All times are in Eastern Time.

== See also ==
- 2015–16 Davidson Wildcats women's basketball team
