= 2015–16 Atlantic 10 Conference men's basketball season =

- League: NCAA Division I
- Sport: Basketball
- Teams: 14
- TV partner(s): CBSSN, NBCSN, CBS

NBA
- Top draft pick: DeAndre' Bembry
- Picked by: Atlanta Hawks

2015–16 NCAA Division I men's basketball season
- Season champions: VCU, St. Bonaventure, Dayton

Tournament
- Champions: Saint Joseph's
- Runners-up: VCU

Atlantic 10 men's basketball seasons
- ← 14–15 16–17 →

2015–16 Atlantic 10 men's basketball standings
	Conf.				Overall
Team	W		L	PCT	W		L	PCT
Dayton	14	–	4	.778	25	–	8	.758
VCU	14	–	4	.778	25	–	11	.694
St. Bonaventure	14	–	4	.778	22	–	9	.710
Saint Joseph's †	13	–	5	.722	28	–	8	.778
George Washington	11	–	7	.611	28	–	10	.737
Davidson	10	–	8	.556	20	–	13	.606
Rhode Island	9	–	9	.500	17	–	15	.531
Fordham	8	–	10	.444	17	–	14	.548
Richmond	7	–	11	.389	16	–	16	.500
UMass	6	–	12	.333	14	–	18	.438
Duquesne	6	–	12	.333	17	–	17	.500
George Mason	5	–	13	.278	11	–	21	.344
Saint Louis	5	–	13	.278	11	–	21	.344
La Salle	4	–	14	.222	9	–	22	.290
† 2016 A10 Tournament winner

The 2015–16 Atlantic 10 Conference men's basketball season was the 40th season of Atlantic 10 Conference basketball. The 2016 Atlantic 10 men's basketball tournament was held at the Barclays Center in Brooklyn, New York.

Dayton, VCU, and St. Bonaventure tied for the regular season championship. Saint Joseph's won the A-10 Tournament.

As a result of winning the A-10 Tournament, Saint Joseph's earned the conference's automatic bid to the NCAA tournament. Dayton and VCU earned at-large bids to the tournament as well.

St. Bonaventure, George Washington, and Davidson all received bids to the NIT. Fordham received a bid to the CollegeInsider.com Tournament.

== Preseason ==
=== Preseason poll ===
Rank	Team
1	Dayton
2	Rhode Island
3	Davidson
4	George Washington
5	VCU
6	Richmond
7	Saint Joseph's
8	St. Bonaventure
9	La Salle
10	Massachusetts
11	Duquesne
12	Saint Louis
13	George Mason
14	Fordham

=== Preseason All-Conference Teams ===
Award	Recipients
First Team	Jack Gibbs (Davidson); Jordan Price (LaSalle); Hassan Martin (Rhode Island); E. C. Matthews (Rhode Island); DeAndre' Bembry (Saint Joseph's)
Second Team	Brian Sullivan (Davidson); Shevon Thompson (George Mason); Patricio Garino (George Washington); Kevin Larsen (George Washington); Marcus Posley (St. Bonaventure)
Third Team	Kendall Pollard (Dayton); Terry Allen (Richmond); ShawnDre' Jones (Richmond); Melvin Johnson (VCU); Mo Alie-Cox (VCU)

== Regular season ==
=== Conference matrix ===
This table summarizes the head-to-head results between teams in conference play. Each team played 18 conference games: 1 game vs. 8 opponents (4 home, 4 away) and 2 games against 5 opponents (home and away).

	Davidson	Dayton	Duquesne	Fordham	GM	GW	La Salle	UMass	Rhode Island	Richmond	St. Joseph's	St. Louis	St. Bonaventure	VCU
vs. Davidson	–	1–0	0–2	1–0	1–1	1–1	0–1	0–1	0–1	0–2	0–1	1–0	1–0	2–0
vs. Dayton	0–1	–	0–2	0–1	0–1	0–1	1–1	0–1	1–1	0–1	1–0	0–2	1–1	0–1
vs. Duquesne	2–0	2–0	–	1–0	0–1	2–0	0–1	1–0	1–0	1–0	0–1	0–2	1–1	1–0
vs. Fordham	0–1	1–0	0–1	–	0–1	1–0	0–2	0–2	1–1	2–0	2–0	1–0	1–0	1–0
vs. George Mason	1–1	1–0	1–0	1–0	–	2–0	1–0	1–0	1–0	0–2	1–0	1–1	1–0	1–1
vs. George Washington	1–1	1–0	0–2	0–1	0–2	–	0–1	0–1	0–1	1–1	1–0	1–0	1–0	1–1
vs. La Salle	1–0	1–1	1–0	2–0	0–1	1–0	–	2–0	2–0	1–0	2–0	0–1	0–1	1–0
vs. UMass	1–0	1–0	0–1	2–0	0–1	1–0	0–2	–	1–1	1–0	2–0	1–0	2–0	0–1
vs. Rhode Island	1–0	1–1	0–1	1–1	0–1	1–0	0–2	1–1	–	0–1	2–0	0–1	1–0	1–0
vs. Richmond	2–0	1–0	0–1	0–2	2–0	1–1	0–1	0–1	1–0	–	1–0	0–1	1–0	2–0
vs. Saint Joseph's	1–0	0–1	1–0	0–2	0–1	0–1	0–2	0–2	0–2	0–1	–	0–1	2–0	1–0
vs. Saint Louis	0–1	2–0	2–0	0–1	1–1	0–1	1–0	0–1	1–0	1–0	1–0	–	2–0	2–0
vs. St. Bonaventure	0–1	1–1	1–1	0–1	0–1	0–1	1–0	0–2	0–1	0–1	0–2	0–2	–	1–0
vs. VCU	0–2	1–0	0–1	0–1	1–1	1–1	0–1	1–0	0–1	0–2	0–1	0–2	0–1	–
Total	10–8	14–4	6–12	8–10	5–13	11–7	4–14	6–12	9–9	7–11	13–5	5–13	14–4	14–4

== Conference Awards ==
Award	Recipients
Coach of the Year	Mark Schmidt (St. Bonaventure)
Player of the Year	DeAndre’ Bembry (Saint Joseph's)
Defensive Player of the Year	Hassan Martin (Rhode Island)
Rookie of the Year	Joseph Chartouny (Fordham)
Sixth Man of the Year	Jabarie Hinds (Massachusetts) and Denzel Gregg (St. Bonaventure)
Chris Daniels Most Improved Player of the Year	Isaiah Miles (Saint Joseph's)
All-Academic Team	Christian Sengfelder (Fordham); Tyler Cavanaugh (George Washington); Patricio Garino (George Washington); Alex Mitola (George Washington); Mike Crawford (Saint Louis); Mo Alie-Cox (VCU)
First Team	Jack Gibbs (Davidson); Charles Cooke (Dayton); Jaylen Adams (St. Bonaventure); DeAndre' Bembry (Saint Joseph's); Melvin Johnson (VCU)
Second Team	Dyshawn Pierre (Dayton); Tyler Cavanaugh (George Washington); Patricio Garino (George Washington); Isaiah Miles (Saint Joseph's); Marcus Posley (St. Bonaventure)
Third Team	Micah Mason (Duquesne); Ryan Rhoomes (Fordham); T. J. Cline (Richmond); Terry Allen (Richmond); Mo Alie-Cox (VCU)
All-Defensive Team	Charles Cooke (Dayton); Patricio Garino (George Washington); Mo Alie-Cox (VCU); Hassan Martin (Rhode Island); DeAndre' Bembry (Saint Joseph's)
All-Rookie Team	Joseph Chartouny (Fordham); Otis Livingston (George Mason); Lamarr Kimble (Saint Joseph's); Jermaine Bishop (Saint Louis); Khwan Fore (Richmond)

== Postseason ==
=== Atlantic 10 tournament ===
Session	Game	Time*	Matchup^{#}	Television	Attendance
First round – Wednesday, March 9
1	1	6:30 pm	#13 Saint Louis 83 vs. #12 George Mason 78	ASN	5,523
1	2	9:00 pm	#14 La Salle 88 vs. #11 Duquesne 73	ASN	5,523
Second round – Thursday, March 10
2	3	12:00 pm	#9 Richmond 70 vs. #8 Fordham 55	NBCSN	6,519
2	4	2:30 pm	#13 Saint Louis 65 vs. #5 George Washington 73	NBCSN	6,519
3	5	6:30 pm	#10 Massachusetts 67 vs. #7 Rhode Island 62	NBCSN	5,507
3	6	9:00 pm	#14 La Salle 63 vs. #6 Davidson 78	NBCSN	5,507
Quarterfinals – Friday, March 11
4	7	12:00 pm	#9 Richmond 54 vs. #1 Dayton 69	NBCSN	7,509
4	8	2:30 pm	#5 George Washington 80 vs. #4 Saint Joseph's 86	NBCSN	7,509
5	9	6:30 pm	#10 Massachusetts 70 vs. #2 VCU 85	NBCSN	8,223
5	10	9:00 pm	#6 Davidson 90 vs. #3 St. Bonaventure 86 (OT)	NBCSN	8,223
Semifinals – Saturday, March 12
6	11	1:30 pm	#4 Saint Joseph's 82 vs. #1 Dayton 79	CBSSN	10,439
6	12	4:00 pm	#6 Davidson 54 vs. #2 VCU 76	CBSSN	10,439
Championship – Sunday, March 13
7	13	1:00 pm	#4 Saint Joseph's 87 vs. #2 VCU 74	CBS	8,413

*Game times in Eastern Time. #Rankings denote tournament seeding.

=== NCAA tournament ===
The Atlantic 10 Conference had three bids to the 2016 NCAA Men's Division I Basketball Tournament.

Seed	Region	School	First Four	Round of 64	Round of 32	Sweet 16	Elite Eight	Final Four	Championship
7	Midwest	Dayton	n/a	lost to (10) Syracuse 51–70					
8	West	Saint Joseph's	n/a	defeated (9) Cincinnati 78–76	lost to (1) Oregon 64–69				
10	West	VCU	n/a	defeated (7) Oregon State 75–67	lost to (2) Oklahoma 81–85				
		W–L (%):	0–0 (–)	2–1 (.667)	0–2 (.000)	0–0 (–)	0–0 (–)	0–0 (–)	0–0 (–) Total: 2–3 (.400)

=== National Invitation tournament ===
St. Bonaventure, George Washington, and Dayton earned NIT bids for the conference.

Seed	Bracket	School	First round	Second round	Quarterfinals	Semifinals	Finals
1	St. Bonaventure	St. Bonaventure	lost to Wagner 75–79				
4	Monmouth	George Washington	defeated Hofstra 82–80	defeated Monmouth 87–71	defeated Florida 82-77	defeated San Diego State 65-46	defeated Valparaiso 76-60
5	Valparaiso	Davidson	lost to Florida State 74–84				
		W–L (%):	1–2 (.333)	1–0 (1.000)	1–0 (1.000)	1–0 (1.000)	1–0 (1.000) Total: 5–2 (.714)

=== CollegeInsider.com tournament ===
Fordham earned the sole bid to the CIT for the conference.

School	First round	Second round	Quarterfinals	Semifinals	Finals
Fordham	lost to Boston 66–69				
W–L (%):	0–1 (.000)	0–0 (–)	0–0 (–)	0–0 (–)	0–0 (–) Total: 0–1 (.000)
