= 2015–16 St. Bonaventure Bonnies men's basketball team =

American college basketball season

2015–16 St. Bonaventure Bonnies men's basketball
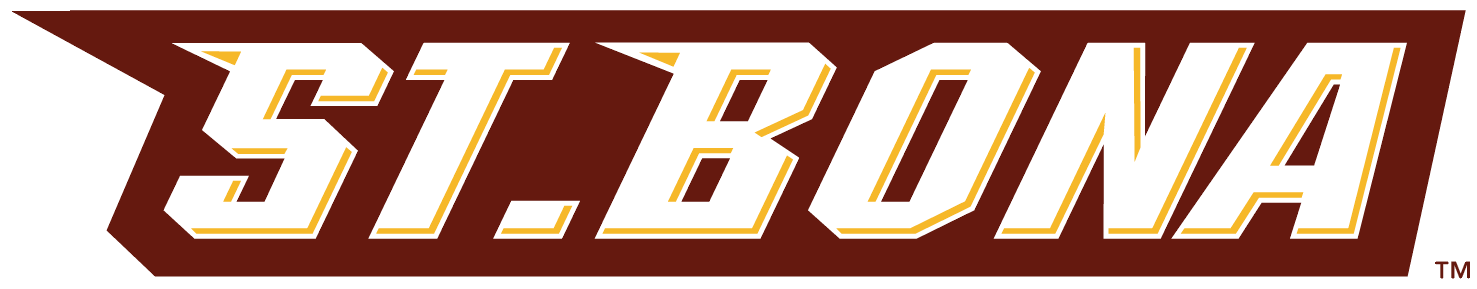

Atlantic 10 regular season co–champions

NIT, First Round
- Conference: Atlantic 10 Conference
- Record: 22–9 (14–4 A-10)
- Head coach: Mark Schmidt (9th season)
- Assistant coaches: Dave Moore; Steve Curran; Jerome Robinson
- Home arena: Reilly Center

2015–16 Atlantic 10 men's basketball standings
	Conf.				Overall
Team	W		L	PCT	W		L	PCT
Dayton	14	–	4	.778	25	–	8	.758
VCU	14	–	4	.778	25	–	11	.694
St. Bonaventure	14	–	4	.778	22	–	9	.710
Saint Joseph's †	13	–	5	.722	28	–	8	.778
George Washington	11	–	7	.611	28	–	10	.737
Davidson	10	–	8	.556	20	–	13	.606
Rhode Island	9	–	9	.500	17	–	15	.531
Fordham	8	–	10	.444	17	–	14	.548
Richmond	7	–	11	.389	16	–	16	.500
UMass	6	–	12	.333	14	–	18	.438
Duquesne	6	–	12	.333	17	–	17	.500
George Mason	5	–	13	.278	11	–	21	.344
Saint Louis	5	–	13	.278	11	–	21	.344
La Salle	4	–	14	.222	9	–	22	.290
† 2016 A10 Tournament winner

The 2015–16 St. Bonaventure Bonnies men's basketball team represented St. Bonaventure University during the 2015–16 NCAA Division I men's basketball season. The Bonnies, led by ninth year head coach Mark Schmidt, played their home games at the Reilly Center and were members of the Atlantic 10 Conference. They finished the season 22–9, 14–4 in A-10 play to finish in a three-way tie for the regular season championship. They lost in the quarterfinals of the A-10 tournament to Davidson. While the two other teams who tied with Saint Bonaventure for the A-10 title received at-large bids to the NCAA tournament, the Bonnies were one of the "First Four Out" and instead received a top seed in the National Invitation Tournament where they lost in the first round to Wagner.

== Previous season ==
The Bonnies finished the 2014–15 season 18–13, 10–8 in A-10 play to finish in a three-way tie for sixth place. They advanced to the quarterfinals of the A-10 tournament where they lost to Dayton. For the second consecutive year, the Bonnies accumulated a winning record but did not receive an invite the postseason; the team failed to receive a bid to the National Invitation Tournament and, in accordance with school policy, preemptively ruled out participating in either the College Basketball Invitational or CollegeInsider.com Postseason Tournament.

== Departures ==
Name	Number	Pos.	Height	Weight	Year	Hometown	Notes
Iakeem Alston	0	G	6'2"	180	Junior	Baltimore, MD	Graduate transferred to West Georgia
Opeyemi Olomo	2	G	5'11"	175	Senior	Brooklyn, NY	Walk-on; graduated
Jalen Adems	4	G	6'5"	185	RS Freshman	Saginaw, MI	Transferred to Mott Community College
Jordan Gathers	5	G	6'3"	200	Senior	Los Angeles, CA	Graduate transferred to Butler
Xavier Smith	11	F	6'8"	205	Sophomore	Plano, TX	Transferred to Tarleton State
Chris Dees	15	F/C	6'8"	260	Senior	Sylmar, CA	Graduated
Andell Cumberbatch	23	G	6'5"	195	Senior	East Orange, NJ	Graduated
Quentin Weinerman	24	G	5'8"	160	Sophomore	Westlake Village, CA	Walk-on; didn't return
Youssou Ndoye	35	C	7'0"	245	Senior	Dakar, Senegal	Graduated

=== Incoming transfers ===
Name	Number	Pos.	Height	Weight	Year	Hometown	Previous School
David Andoh	0	F	6'7"	220	Senior	Montreal, QC	Transferred from Liberty. Under NCAA transfer rules, Andoh will have to sit out for the 2015–16 season. Will have one year of remaining eligibility.
Matt Mobley	2	G	6'1"	175	Junior	Worcester, MA	Transferred from Central Connecticut. Under NCAA transfer rules, Mobley will have to sit out for the 2015–16 season. Will have two years of remaining eligibility.
Courtney Stockard	11	G	6'5"	185	Junior	St. Louis, MO	Junior college transferred from Allen Community College

== Incoming recruits ==
College recruiting
Name	Hometown	School	Height	Weight	Commit date
LaDarien Griffin; PF	Jacksonville, FL	Providence School of Jacksonville	6 ft 7 in (2.01 m)	N/A	Nov 13, 2014
LaDarien Griffin; PF	Recruit ratings: Scout: Rivals: (NR)				
Nelson Kaputo; PG	Toronto, ON	St. Michael's College School	6 ft 0 in (1.83 m)	N/A	May 1, 2015
Nelson Kaputo; PG	Recruit ratings: Scout: Rivals: (NR)				
Overall recruit ranking:
Note: In many cases, Scout, Rivals, 247Sports, On3, and ESPN may conflict in their listings of height and weight.; In these cases, the average was taken. ESPN grades are on a 100-point scale.; Sources: "2015 Team Ranking". Rivals.

== Roster ==
2015–16 St. Bonaventure Bonnies men's basketball team
Players
Coaches

Pos.	#	Name	Height	Weight	Year	Hometown
F	0	David Andoh (I) (redshirt)	6 ft 7 in (2.01 m)	220 lb (100 kg)	Sr	Montreal, QC
G	1	Idris Taqqee	6 ft 4 in (1.93 m)	190 lb (86 kg)	So	Ashburnham, MA
G	2	Matt Mobley (I) (redshirt)	6 ft 3 in (1.91 m)	180 lb (82 kg)	Jr	Worcester, MA
G	3	Marcus Posley	6 ft 1 in (1.85 m)	200 lb (91 kg)	Sr	Rockford, IL
G	4	Nelson Kaputo	6 ft 1 in (1.85 m)	170 lb (77 kg)	Fr	Toronto, ON
G	10	Jaylen Adams	6 ft 2 in (1.88 m)	185 lb (84 kg)	So	Baltimore, MD
G/F	11	Courtney Stockard	6 ft 5 in (1.96 m)	190 lb (86 kg)	Jr	St. Louis, MO
F	12	Denzel Gregg	6 ft 7 in (2.01 m)	215 lb (98 kg)	Jr	Syracuse, NY
F	15	LaDarien Griffin	6 ft 7 in (2.01 m)	200 lb (91 kg)	Fr	Jacksonville, FL
F	20	Derrick Woods	6 ft 8 in (2.03 m)	215 lb (98 kg)	Fr	Trenton, NJ
F	21	Dion Wright	6 ft 7 in (2.01 m)	220 lb (100 kg)	Sr	Lakewood, CA
G	24	Caleb McGuire (W)	6 ft 4 in (1.93 m)	190 lb (86 kg)	Jr	Belmont, NY
F	45	Jordan Tyson	6 ft 10 in (2.08 m)	225 lb (102 kg)	RS Fr	Cincinnati, OH

Head coach

- Mark Schmidt (Boston College)

Assistant coach(es)

- Dave Moore (Bethel (TN))
- Steve Curran (Merrimack)
- Jerome Robinson (Bradley)

Legend

- (C) Team captain
- (S) Suspended
- (I) Ineligible
- (W) Walk-on
- Injured
- Current redshirt

Roster

== Schedule ==
Date time, TV	Rank^{#}	Opponent^{#}	Result	Record	Site (attendance) city, state
Exhibition
11/07/2015*; 4:00 pm		Mansfield	W 108–48		Reilly Center (3,273); Olean, NY
Non-conference regular season
11/13/2015*; 8:00 pm		Binghamton	W 63–53	1–0	Reilly Center (4,277); Olean, NY
11/17/2015*; 7:00 pm, RSN		at Syracuse	L 66–79	1–1	Carrier Dome (21,379); Syracuse, NY
11/21/2015*; 7:00 pm		Loyola (MD)	W 94–82	2–1	Reilly Center (3,658); Olean, NY
11/24/2015*; 7:00 pm, ESPN3		at Canisius	W 77–73	3–1	Koessler Athletic Center (2,007); Buffalo, NY
11/28/2015*; 4:00 pm		Hofstra	L 83–89	3–2	Reilly Center (3,229); Olean, NY
12/02/2015*; 7:00 pm		at Buffalo	W 60–58	4–2	Alumni Arena (4,192); Amherst, NY
12/05/2015*; 4:00 pm, TWCSC		Ohio	W 81–68	5–2	Reilly Center (3,565); Olean, NY
12/08/2015*; 7:00 pm, TWCSC		Vermont	W 80–68	6–2	Reilly Center (3,021); Olean, NY
12/19/2015*; 2:00 pm, TWCSC		South Carolina State	W 64–45	7–2	Reilly Center (3,347); Olean, NY
12/22/2015*; 7:00 pm, TWCSC		at Siena; Franciscan Cup	L 70–73	7-3	Times Union Center (6,593); Albany, NY
12/30/2015*; 7:00 pm, TWCSC		Niagara	W 82–68	8–3	Reilly Center (3,728); Olean, NY
Atlantic 10 regular season
01/02/2016; 8:00 pm, ASN		Davidson	W 97–85	9–3 (1–0)	Reilly Center (3,783); Olean, NY
01/06/2016; 8:00 pm, ASN		at George Mason	W 77–58	10–3 (2–0)	EagleBank Arena (2,807); Fairfax, VA
01/09/2016; 12:00 pm, CBSSN		at Massachusetts	W 88–77	11–3 (3–0)	Mullins Center (4,224); Amherst, MA
01/13/2016; 7:00 pm, TWCSC		Rhode Island	W 69–64	12–3 (4–0)	Reilly Center (3,219); Olean, NY
01/16/2016; 6:00 pm, ASN		at Duquesne	L 88–95	12–4 (4–1)	Palumbo Center (2,425); Pittsburgh, PA
01/19/2016; 7:00 pm, ASN		Dayton	L 79–85	12–5 (4–2)	Reilly Center (4,176); Olean, NY
01/23/2016; 2:30 pm, NBCSN		at VCU	L 76–84	12–6 (4–3)	Siegel Center (7,637); Richmond, VA
01/31/2016; 3:00 pm, ASN		Richmond	W 84–68	13–6 (5–3)	Reilly Center (5,263); Olean, NY
02/03/2016; 7:00 pm		at Saint Joseph's	W 83–73	14–6 (6–3)	Hagan Arena (4,027); Philadelphia, PA
02/07/2016; 2:00 pm, NBCSN		Saint Louis	W 65–62	15–6 (7–3)	Reilly Center (3,712); Olean, NY
02/10/2016; 7:00 pm		at Fordham	W 76–72 ^{OT}	16–6 (8–3)	Rose Hill Gymnasium (2,021); Bronx, NY
02/13/2016; 4:00 pm, TWCSC		George Washington	W 64–57	17–6 (9–3)	Reilly Center (5,480); Olean, NY
02/17/2016; 7:00 pm		at La Salle	L 64–71	17–7 (9–4)	Tom Gola Arena (1,329); Philadelphia, PA
02/20/2016; 12:00 pm, NBCSN		at No. 15 Dayton	W 79–72	18–7 (10–4)	UD Arena (13,455); Dayton, OH
02/24/2016; 7:00 pm, TWCSC		Duquesne	W 80–76	19–7 (11–4)	Reilly Center (4,101); Olean, NY
02/27/2016; 4:00 pm		Massachusetts	W 85–83	20–7 (12–4)	Reilly Center (5,294); Olean, NY
03/02/2016; 7:00 pm		vs. Saint Joseph's; Lightower Conference Classic	W 98–90	21–7 (13–4)	Blue Cross Arena (6,734); Rochester, NY
03/05/2016; 8:00 pm		at Saint Louis	W 76–67	22–7 (14–4)	Chaifetz Arena (7,812); St. Louis, MO
Atlantic 10 tournament
03/11/2016; 9:00 pm, NBCSN	(3)	vs. (6) Davidson; Quarterfinals	L 86–90 ^{OT}	22–8	Barclays Center (8,223); Brooklyn, NY
NIT
03/16/2016*; 7:00 pm, ESPN3	(1)	(8) Wagner; First round – St. Bonaventure Bracket	L 75–79	22–9	Reilly Center (4,793); Olean, NY
*Non-conference game. ^{#}Rankings from AP Poll/Coaches' Poll. (#) Tournament seedings in parentheses. All times are in Eastern Time.

== See also ==
- 2015–16 St. Bonaventure Bonnies women's basketball team
