= 2015–16 George Mason Patriots men's basketball team =

American college basketball season

2015–16 George Mason Patriots men's basketball
- Conference: Atlantic 10 Conference
- Record: 11–21 (5–13 A-10)
- Head coach: Dave Paulsen (1st season)
- Assistant coaches: Dane Fischer; Aaron Kelly; Duane Simpkins
- Home arena: EagleBank Arena

2015–16 Atlantic 10 men's basketball standings
	Conf.				Overall
Team	W		L	PCT	W		L	PCT
Dayton	14	–	4	.778	25	–	8	.758
VCU	14	–	4	.778	25	–	11	.694
St. Bonaventure	14	–	4	.778	22	–	9	.710
Saint Joseph's †	13	–	5	.722	28	–	8	.778
George Washington	11	–	7	.611	28	–	10	.737
Davidson	10	–	8	.556	20	–	13	.606
Rhode Island	9	–	9	.500	17	–	15	.531
Fordham	8	–	10	.444	17	–	14	.548
Richmond	7	–	11	.389	16	–	16	.500
UMass	6	–	12	.333	14	–	18	.438
Duquesne	6	–	12	.333	17	–	17	.500
George Mason	5	–	13	.278	11	–	21	.344
Saint Louis	5	–	13	.278	11	–	21	.344
La Salle	4	–	14	.222	9	–	22	.290
† 2016 A10 Tournament winner

The 2015–16 George Mason Patriots Men's basketball team represented George Mason University during the 2015–16 NCAA Division I men's basketball season. It was the 50th season for the program. The Patriots were led by Dave Paulsen in his first season as head coach of the program following Paul Hewitt's dismissal. They played their home games at EagleBank Arena and were members of the Atlantic 10 Conference. They finished the season 11–21, 5–13 in A-10 play to finish in a tie for 12th place. They lost to Saint Louis in the first round of the Atlantic 10 tournament.

== Previous season ==
The Patriots finished the season with an overall record of 9–22, with a record of 4–14 in the Atlantic 10 regular season for thirteenth-place finish. In the 2015 Atlantic 10 tournament, the Patriots were defeated by Fordham, 71–65 in the first round.

== Offseason ==
=== Departures ===
Name	Number	Pos.	Height	Weight	Year	Hometown	Notes
Vaughn Gray	1	F	6'5"	192	Senior	Elmwood Park, NJ	Graduated
Patrick Holloway	3	G	6'1"	164	Senior	Fairfax, VA	Voluntarily left team after 4 games this season
Eric Lockett	5	F	6'5"	189	Freshman	Atlanta, GA	Transferred to Chipola College
Corey Edwards	13	G	5'11"	177	Senior	Middle Village, NY	Graduated
Trey Porter	15	F	6'10"	200	Freshman	Dumfries, VA	Transferred to Old Dominion
Isaiah Jackson	44	F	6'6"	207	Freshman	Gainesville, FL	Transferred to Providence

== Awards ==
Atlantic 10 All Rookie Team

- Otis Livingston II

Atlantic 10 Rookie of the Week

- Jaire Grayer - Nov. 22
- DeAndre Abram - Dec. 20, Dec. 27
- Otis Livingston II - Jan. 10, Feb. 7

== Roster ==
2015–16 George Mason Patriots men's basketball team
Players
Coaches

Pos.	#	Name	Height	Weight	Year	Previous school	Hometown
F	1	DeAndre Abram	6 ft 7 in (2.01 m)	182 lb (83 kg)	Fr	Creekview High School	Carrollton, TX
G	2	Kameron Murrell	6 ft 2 in (1.88 m)	200 lb (91 kg)	Fr	IMG Academy	Long Beach, CA
G	4	Otis Livingston II	5 ft 11 in (1.8 m)	162 lb (73 kg)	Fr	Linden High School	Linden, NJ
G	5	Jaire Grayer	6 ft 4 in (1.93 m)	187 lb (85 kg)	Fr	IMG Academy	Flint, MI
F	10	Marko Gujaničić	6 ft 8 in (2.03 m)	236 lb (107 kg)	Sr	Stoneridge Prep	Cacak, Serbia
G	11	Andre Ahiagbede (W)	6 ft 1 in (1.85 m)	155 lb (70 kg)	Fr	Wakefield School	Centreville, VA
G	12	Myles Tate (W)	5 ft 7 in (1.7 m)	161 lb (73 kg)	RS Jr	Mars Hill University	Ashburn, VA
C	14	Shevon Thompson	6 ft 11 in (2.11 m)	243 lb (110 kg)	Sr	Harcum College	Clarendon Parish, Jamaica
F	15	Danny Dixon	6 ft 10 in (2.08 m)	215 lb (98 kg)	Fr	IMG Academy	Grosse Pointe South, MI
G	22	Marquise Moore	6 ft 2 in (1.88 m)	202 lb (92 kg)	Jr	Saint Thomas More	Queens, NY
F	25	Julian Royal	6 ft 8 in (2.03 m)	232 lb (105 kg)	RS Sr	Milton	Alpharetta, GA
F	30	Michael Rudy (W)	6 ft 7 in (2.01 m)	204 lb (93 kg)	RS Jr	Saint Thomas More	Falls Church, VA
F	31	Jalen Jenkins	6 ft 7 in (2.01 m)	245 lb (111 kg)	RS Jr	Cardinal Hayes	Brooklyn, NY
F	33	Daniel Relvao (injured)	6 ft 9 in (2.06 m)	236 lb (107 kg)	Fr	Mountain Mission	Coimbra, Portugal

Head coach

- Dave Paulsen (Williams)

Assistant coach(es)

- Dane Fischer (Ithaca)
- Aaron Kelly (Catholic)
- Duane Simpkins (Maryland)

Legend

- (C) Team captain
- (S) Suspended
- (I) Ineligible
- (W) Walk-on
- Injured
- Current redshirt

Roster

== Stats ==
Player	GP	GS	MPG	FG%	3FG%	FT%	RPG	APG	SPG	BPG	PPG
Otis Livingston II	32	32	34.3	.390	.354	.777	2.6	3.6	0.7	0.0	11.9
Marquise Moore	28	27	32.5	.398	.063	.679	6.1	3.1	0.6	0.9	11.4
Shevon Thompson	31	29	22.7	.577	.000	.558	10.6	0.5	0.1	1.0	9.9
Jaire Grayer	32	31	29.5	.380	.297	.536	3.8	0.8	0.3	0.4	9.5
Marko Gujanicic	28	22	25.9	.423	.329	.712	6.5	1.5	0.2	0.1	9.2
Jalen Jenkins	32	4	21.4	.497	.000	.692	5.5	0.6	0.5	0.8	7.1
DeAndre Abram	32	13	20.6	.344	.275	.703	2.9	0.2	0.2	0.4	6.6
Patrick Holloway	4	0	13.8	.304	.313	.667	1.3	0.0	0.3	0.3	5.3
Kameron Murrell	32	2	12.0	.189	.224	.813	1.3	0.3	0.2	0.1	1.9
Julian Royal	7	0	4.6	.308	.000	.667	0.7	0.0	0.1	0.3	1.4
Danny Dixon	25	0	7.5	.391	.000	.650	1.2	0.3	0.0	0.2	1.2
Myles Tate	15	0	4.5	.200	.250	.833	0.4	0.2	0.2	0.0	0.7
Michael Rudy	10	0	1.8	.000	.000	.000	0.2	0.0	0.0	0.0	0.0

== Schedule and results ==
Date time, TV	Rank^{#}	Opponent^{#}	Result	Record	High points	High rebounds	High assists	Site (attendance) city, state
Non-conference regular season
November 13*; 7:00 pm, MASN		Colgate	L 53–66	0–1	13 – Moore	14 – Thompson	2 – Moore	EagleBank Arena (5,124); Fairfax, VA
November 16*; 7:00 pm, ESPN3		at Mercer	L 60–69	0–2	17 – Livingston II	9 – Gujanicic	6 – Moore	Hawkins Arena (2,427); Macon, GA
November 19*; 12:00 pm, ESPN3		vs. Ole Miss; Charleston Classic Quarterfinals	W 68–62	1–2	19 – Thompson	16 – Thompson	6 – Gujanicic	TD Arena (1,760); Charleston, SC
November 20*; 1:00 pm, ESPNU		vs. Oklahoma State; Charleston Classic Semifinals	W 71–68 ^{OT}	2–2	23 – Grayer	17 – Thompson	8 – Moore	TD Arena (1,220); Charleston, SC
November 22*; 9:30 pm, ESPN2		vs. No. 6 Virginia; Charleston Classic Final	L 66–83	2–3	16 – Grayer	8 – Thompson	6 – Moore	TD Arena (2,820); Charleston, SC
November 25*; 7:00 pm		at Manhattan	L 67–69	2–4	15 – Grayer	10 – Gujanicic	4 – Gujanicic/Moore	Draddy Gymnasium (790); Riverdale, NY
November 28*; 4:00 pm		Wright State	W 66–39	3–4	14 – Livingston II	7 – Abram/Moore	5 – Moore	EagleBank Arena (3,124); Fairfax, VA
December 2*; 7:00 pm		at Towson	L 54–75	3–5	12 – Gujanicic	12 – Thompson	4 – Moore	SECU Arena (1,562); Towson, MD
December 5*; 7:00 pm		Penn	W 63–44	4–5	20 – Grayer	12 – Thompson	2 – 3 players tied	EagleBank Arena (3,838); Fairfax, VA
December 8*; 7:00 pm, ASN		Northern Iowa	L 65–73	4–6	15 – Moore	10 – Thompson	3 – Livingston II	EagleBank Arena (4,102); Fairfax, VA
December 12*; 4:00 pm		at James Madison	L 46–69	4–7	9 – 3 players tied	9 – Jenkins/Thompson	1 – 3 players tied	JMU Convocation Center (3,856); Harrisonburg, VA
December 19*; 8:00 pm		Longwood	W 75–70	5–7	24 – Abram	9 – Moore	5 – Livingston II	EagleBank Arena (3,118); Fairfax, VA
December 22*; 12:00 pm		Wagner	W 71–60	6–7	27 – Abram	11 – Moore	5 – Moore	EagleBank Arena (5,039); Fairfax, VA
Atlantic 10 regular season
January 2; 5:00 pm, CBSSN		at VCU; Rivalry	L 47–71	6–8 (0–1)	14 – Moore	14 – Thompson	2 – Abram/Livingston II	Siegel Center (7,637); Richmond, VA
January 6; 8:00 pm, ASN		St. Bonaventure	L 58–77	6–9 (0–2)	14 – Thompson	17 – Thompson	4 – Gujanicic/Livingston II	EagleBank Arena (2,807); Fairfax, VA
January 9; 7:00 pm		at Davidson	L 75–81	6–10 (0–3)	20 – Jenkins	9 – Jenkins	5 – Livingston II	John M. Belk Arena (4,158); Davdison, NC
January 13; 7:00 pm		Saint Joseph's	L 73–87	6–11 (0–4)	21 – Moore	11 – Thompson	4 – Livingston II	EagleBank Arena (3,044); Fairfax, VA
January 17; 3:00 pm, NBCSN		at Saint Louis	W 92–79	7–11 (1–4)	22 – Moore	11 – Thompson	6 – Livingston II	Chaifetz Arena (7,022); St. Louis, MO
January 20; 7:00 pm		at Fordham	L 62–73	7–12 (1–5)	18 – Moore	6 – 4 players tied	6 – Moore	Rose Hill Gymnasium (1,689); Bronx, NY
January 23; 4:00 pm		Duquesne	L 75–86	7–13 (1–6)	17 – Grayer	16 – Moore	3 – 4–tied	EagleBank Arena (2,626); Fairfax, VA
January 31; 12:00 pm, NBCSN		George Washington; Revolutionary Rivalry	L 70–76	7–14 (1–7)	18 – Livingston II	12 – Thompson	17 – Livingston II	EagleBank Arena (5,168); Fairfax, VA
February 3; 7:00 pm		at Richmond	W 78–74	8–14 (2–7)	20 – Grayer	12 – Thompson	5 – Livingston II	Robins Center; Richmond, VA
February 6; 6:00 pm, MASN		No. 24 Dayton	L 64–98	8–15 (2–8)	21 – Livingston II	6 – Thompson	5 – Livingston II	EagleBank Arena (5,271); Fairfax, VA
February 9; 7:00 pm		at Rhode Island	L 63–81	8–16 (2–9)	17 – Thompson	10 – Thompson	5 – Livingston II	Ryan Center (3,951); Kingston, RI
February 13; 4:00 pm, MASN		Davidson	W 60–59	9–16 (3–9)	17 – Jenkins	10 – Thompson	3 – Livingston II	EagleBank Arena (6,327); Fairfax, VA
February 17; 7:00 pm		Saint Louis	L 77–79 ^{OT}	9–17 (3–10)	18 – Jenkins	14 – Thompson	5 – Livingston II	EagleBank Arena (3,015); Fairfax, VA
February 21; 4:00 pm, NBCSN		at Massachusetts	L 64–70	9–18 (3–11)	15 – Livingtson II	7 – Grayer	5 – Livingston II	Mullins Center (3,691); Amherst, MA
February 24; 7:00 pm, MASN		VCU; Rivalry	W 76–69	10–18 (4–11)	17 – Thompson	12 – Thompson	4 – Jenkins	EagleBank Arena (5,138); Fairfax, VA
February 27; 2:00 pm		at La Salle	L 68–76	10–19 (4–12)	18 – Livingston II	15 – Thompson	3 – Livingston II	Tom Gola Arena (2,721); Philadelphia, PA
March 1; 8:00 pm, ASN		at George Washington	L 52–74	10–20 (4–13)	14 – Grayer	8 – Grayer & Thompson	5 – Livingston II	Charles E. Smith Center (3,031); Washington, D.C.
March 5; 6:00 pm, ASN		Richmond	W 83–73	11–20 (5–13)	21 – Livingston II	17 – Thompson	5 – Livingston II	EagleBank Arena (6,765); Fairfax, VA
Atlantic 10 tournament
March 9; 6:30 pm, ASN	(13)	vs. (12) Saint Louis; First round	L 78–83	11–21	17 – Moore	15 – Thompson	4 – Moore	Barclays Center (5,523); Brooklyn, NY
*Non-conference game. ^{#}Rankings from AP Poll. (#) Tournament seedings in parentheses. All times are in Eastern Time.

== Recruiting ==
The following is a list of players signed for the 2016–17 season:

College recruiting information
Name	Hometown	School	Height	Weight	Commit date
Ian Boyd; G	Apex, NC	Apex High School	6 ft 3 in (1.91 m)	200 lb (91 kg)	Oct 6, 2015
Ian Boyd; G	Recruit ratings: (2)				
Justin Keir; G	Spotswood, VA	Spotswood High School	6 ft 3 in (1.91 m)	180 lb (82 kg)	Oct 15, 2015
Justin Keir; G	Recruit ratings: (2)				
Karmari Newman; G	Detroit, MI	East English Village Preparatory Academy	6 ft 4 in (1.93 m)	200 lb (91 kg)	Oct 15, 2015
Karmari Newman; G	Recruit ratings: No ratings found				
Troy Temara; F	Syracuse, NY	West Genesee High School	6 ft 8 in (2.03 m)	225 lb (102 kg)	Sep 20, 2015
Troy Temara; F	Recruit ratings: (2)				
A.J. Wilson; F	Bowie, MD	Elev8 Sports Institute	6 ft 6 in (1.98 m)	180 lb (82 kg)	May 2, 2016
A.J. Wilson; F	Recruit ratings: Scout:				
Overall recruit ranking:
Note: In many cases, Scout, Rivals, 247Sports, On3, and ESPN may conflict in their listings of height and weight.; In these cases, the average was taken. ESPN grades are on a 100-point scale.; Sources: "ESPN". ESPN.; "2016 Team Ranking". Rivals.

== See also ==
2015–16 George Mason Patriots women's basketball team
