= 2015–16 Fordham Rams men's basketball team =

American college basketball season

2015–16 Fordham Rams men's basketball

CIT, First round
- Conference: Atlantic 10
- Record: 17–14 (8–10 A-10)
- Head coach: Jeff Neubauer (1st season)
- Assistant coaches: Rodney Crawford; Tony Chiles; Jaden Uken
- Home arena: Rose Hill Gymnasium

2015–16 Atlantic 10 men's basketball standings
	Conf.				Overall
Team	W		L	PCT	W		L	PCT
Dayton	14	–	4	.778	25	–	8	.758
VCU	14	–	4	.778	25	–	11	.694
St. Bonaventure	14	–	4	.778	22	–	9	.710
Saint Joseph's †	13	–	5	.722	28	–	8	.778
George Washington	11	–	7	.611	28	–	10	.737
Davidson	10	–	8	.556	20	–	13	.606
Rhode Island	9	–	9	.500	17	–	15	.531
Fordham	8	–	10	.444	17	–	14	.548
Richmond	7	–	11	.389	16	–	16	.500
UMass	6	–	12	.333	14	–	18	.438
Duquesne	6	–	12	.333	17	–	17	.500
George Mason	5	–	13	.278	11	–	21	.344
Saint Louis	5	–	13	.278	11	–	21	.344
La Salle	4	–	14	.222	9	–	22	.290
† 2016 A10 Tournament winner

The 2015–16 Fordham Rams men's basketball team represented Fordham University during the 2015–16 NCAA Division I men's basketball season. The Rams, led by first year head coach Jeff Neubauer, played their home games at Rose Hill Gymnasium as a member of the Atlantic 10 Conference. They finished the season 17–14, 8–10 in A-10 play to finish in eighth place. They lost in the second round of the A-10 tournament to Richmond. They were invited to the CollegeInsdier.com Tournament where they lost in the first round to Boston University.

== Previous season ==
The Rams finished the 2014–15 season 10–21, 4–14 in A-10 play to finish in twelfth place. They advanced to the second round of the A-10 tournament where they lost to VCU.

== Departures ==
Name	Number	Pos.	Height	Weight	Year	Hometown	Notes
Eric Paschall	4	F	6'6"	205	Freshman	Dobbs Ferry, NY	Transferred to Villanova
Nihad Musovic	15	G	6'0"	185	Junior	Yonkers, NY	Graduated
Bryan Smith	24	G	6'2"	190	Senior	Brooklyn, NY	Graduated
DC Gaitley	32	G	6'1"	190	Senior	Haverford, PA	Graduated
Manny Suarez	44	F	6'10"	225	Sophomore	Cliffside Park, NJ	Transferred to Adelphi

== Incoming recruits ==
College recruiting information
Name	Hometown	School	Height	Weight	Commit date
Jahshire Hardnett; PG	Gulfport, MS	Gulfport High School	5 ft 10 in (1.78 m)	170 lb (77 kg)	May 7, 2015
Jahshire Hardnett; PG	Recruit ratings: Scout: Rivals: (77)				
Nych Smith; PG	Memphis, TN	White Station High School	5 ft 10 in (1.78 m)	170 lb (77 kg)	May 14, 2015
Nych Smith; PG	Recruit ratings: Scout: Rivals: (77)				
Jesse Bunting; C	Plymouth, MA	Tabor Academy	6 ft 8 in (2.03 m)	230 lb (100 kg)	Sep 14, 2014
Jesse Bunting; C	Recruit ratings: Scout: Rivals: (72)				
Joseph Chartouny; PG	Saint-Hubert, Quebec	College Jean-De-Brebeuf	6 ft 3 in (1.91 m)	170 lb (77 kg)	Sep 26, 2014
Joseph Chartouny; PG	Recruit ratings: Scout: Rivals: (NR)				
Overall recruit ranking:
Note: In many cases, Scout, Rivals, 247Sports, On3, and ESPN may conflict in their listings of height and weight.; In these cases, the average was taken. ESPN grades are on a 100-point scale.; Sources: "2015 Team Ranking". Rivals.

== Roster ==
2015–16 Fordham Rams men's basketball team
Players
Coaches

Pos.	#	Name	Height	Weight	Year	Hometown
G	0	Antwoine Anderson	6 ft 1 in (1.85 m)	190 lb (86 kg)	RS So	Rochester, NY
G	1	Nych Smith	5 ft 11 in (1.8 m)	187 lb (85 kg)	Fr	Memphis, TN
G	3	Nemanja Zarkovic	6 ft 3 in (1.91 m)	185 lb (84 kg)	So	Montreal, QE
G	4	Jashire Hardnett (redshirt)	5 ft 11 in (1.8 m)	170 lb (77 kg)	RS Fr	Gulfport, MS
G	5	Thomas Sanchez (W)	5 ft 9 in (1.75 m)	155 lb (70 kg)	So	Maspeth, NY
G	10	Jon Severe	6 ft 2 in (1.88 m)	185 lb (84 kg)	Jr	Brooklyn, NY
G	12	Joseph Chartouny	6 ft 3 in (1.91 m)	205 lb (93 kg)	Fr	Saint-Hubert, QE
G	13	Matt Massimino (W)	5 ft 11 in (1.8 m)	170 lb (77 kg)	Jr	New Hope, PA
F	21	Jesse Bunting	6 ft 8 in (2.03 m)	210 lb (95 kg)	Fr	Plymouth, MA
F	22	David Pekárek	6 ft 7 in (2.01 m)	210 lb (95 kg)	Fr	Prague, Czech Republic
G	23	Mandell Thomas	6 ft 2 in (1.88 m)	185 lb (84 kg)	Sr	Rochester, NY
F	30	Ryan Rhoomes (C)	6 ft 8 in (2.03 m)	235 lb (107 kg)	Sr	South Jamaica, NY
F	40	Chris Downing (W)	6 ft 8 in (2.03 m)	235 lb (107 kg)	Fr	Orangeburg, NY
C	42	Ryan Canty	6 ft 9 in (2.06 m)	240 lb (109 kg)	RS Sr	Danvers, MA
F	43	Christian Sengfelder	6 ft 7 in (2.01 m)	238 lb (108 kg)	So	Leverkusen, Germany
F	55	Dekeba Battee-Aston	6 ft 9 in (2.06 m)	255 lb (116 kg)	So	Cairns, Australia

Head coach

- Jeff Neubauer (La Salle)

Assistant coach(es)

- Rodney Crawford (Cincinnati)
- Tony Chiles (Columbia)
- Jaden Uken (Nebraska)

Legend

- (C) Team captain
- (S) Suspended
- (I) Ineligible
- (W) Walk-on
- Injured
- Current redshirt

Roster

== Schedule and results ==
Date time, TV	Rank^{#}	Opponent^{#}	Result	Record	Site (attendance) city, state
Non-conference regular season
11/14/2015*; 8:30 pm		at Texas–Arlington	L 72–77	0–1	College Park Center (3,863); Arlington, TX
11/17/2015*; 7:00 pm		Queens College	W 76–57	1–1	Rose Hill Gymnasium (2,132); Bronx, NY
11/21/2015*; 2:00 pm		Fairleigh Dickinson	W 85–62	2–1	Rose Hill Gymnasium (2,108); Bronx, NY
11/24/2015*; 8:00 pm		Colgate	W 84–58	3–1	Rose Hill Gymnasium (1,538); Bronx, NY
11/28/2015*; 5:00 pm		Manhattan	W 87–64	4–1	Rose Hill Gymnasium (2,747); Bronx, NY
12/02/2015*; 7:00 pm		St. John's; Rivalry	W 73–57	5–1	Rose Hill Gymnasium (3,068); Bronx, NY
12/05/2015*; 4:00 pm		Central Connecticut	W 86–54	6–1	Rose Hill Gymnasium (1,992); Bronx, NY
12/08/2015*; 7:00 pm		LIU Brooklyn	W 89–84 ^{OT}	7–1	Rose Hill Gymnasium (1,595); Bronx, NY
12/13/2015*; 1:00 pm		Coppin State	W 92–55	8–1	Rose Hill Gymnasium (1,331); Bronx, NY
12/19/2015*; 2:00 pm		Maine	W 70–53	9–1	Rose Hill Gymnasium (2,032); Bronx, NY
12/22/2015*; 3:30 pm		vs. Boston College; Atlantic 10/ACC Showcase	L 55–64	9–2	Barclays Center; Brooklyn, NY
Atlantic 10 regular season
01/03/2016; 7:00 pm, NBCSN		at George Washington	L 63–69	9–3 (0–1)	Charles E. Smith Center (2,813); Washington, D.C.
01/06/2016; 7:00 pm		La Salle	W 66–61	10–3 (1–1)	Rose Hill Gymnasium (1,024); Bronx, NY
01/10/2016; 2:00 pm, NBCSN		Richmond	L 82–93	10–4 (1–2)	Rose Hill Gymnasium (2,385); Bronx, NY
01/13/2016; 7:00 pm, ASN		at VCU	L 54–88	10–5 (1–3)	Siegel Center (7,637); Richmond, VA
01/16/2016; 1:00 pm		at Saint Joseph's	L 55–80	10–6 (1–4)	Hagan Arena (4,200); Philadelphia, PA
01/20/2016; 7:00 pm		George Mason	W 73–62	11–6 (2–4)	Rose Hill Gymnasium (1,689); Bronx, NY
01/24/2016; 4:00 pm, CBSSN		Dayton	L 50–64	11–7 (2–5)	Rose Hill Gymnasium (2,014); Bronx, NY
01/27/2016; 7:00 pm, ASN		at Rhode Island	L 63–79	11–8 (2–6)	Ryan Center (4,195); Kingston, RI
01/30/2016; 12:00 pm, NBCSN		at Massachusetts	W 78–72 ^{OT}	12–8 (3–6)	Mullins Center (3,562); Amherst, MA
02/06/2016; 2:00 pm		Saint Joseph's	L 60–82	12–9 (3–7)	Rose Hill Gymnasium (3,200); Bronx, NY
02/10/2016; 7:00 pm		St. Bonaventure	L 72–76 ^{OT}	12–10 (3–8)	Rose Hill Gymnasium (2,021); Bronx, NY
02/13/2016; 6:00 pm		at Richmond	L 67–71	12–11 (3–9)	Robins Center (7,201); Richmond, VA
02/17/2016; 7:00 pm, ASN		Massachusetts	W 76–66	13–11 (4–9)	Rose Hill Gymnasium (2,341); Bronx, NY
02/20/2016; 8:00 pm, ASN		at Saint Louis	L 68–76	13–12 (4–10)	Chaifetz Arena (8,591); St. Louis, MO
02/24/2016; 7:00 pm		at La Salle	W 56–53	14–12 (5–10)	Tom Gola Arena (1,350); Philadelphia, PA
02/27/2016; 2:00 pm		Davidson	W 91–82	15–12 (6–10)	Rose Hill Gymnasium (2,985); Bronx, NY
03/02/2016; 7:00 pm		at Duqensne	W 78–69	16–12 (7–10)	Palumbo Center (1,283); Pittsburgh, PA
03/05/2016; 2:00 pm		Rhode Island	W 64–61	17–12 (8–10)	Rose Hill Gymnasium (3,200); Bronx, NY
Atlantic 10 tournament
03/10/2016; 12:00 pm, NBCSN	(8)	vs. (9) Richmond; Second round	L 55–70	17–13	Barclays Center (6,519); Brooklyn, NY
CIT
03/16/2016*; 7:00 pm		Boston University; First round	L 66–69	17–14	Rose Hill Gymnasium (1,264); Bronx, NY
*Non-conference game. ^{#}Rankings from AP Poll. (#) Tournament seedings in parentheses. All times are in Eastern Time.

== See also ==
2015–16 Fordham Rams women's basketball team
