= 2016 Atlantic 10 men's basketball tournament =

- Classification: Division I
- Season: 2015–16
- Teams: 14
- Site: Barclays Center; Brooklyn, New York
- Champions: Saint Joseph's (4th title)
- Winning coach: Phil Martelli (3rd title)
- MVP: Isaiah Miles (Saint Joseph's)
- Attendance: 52,133
- Television: ASN, NBCSN, CBSSN, CBS

2015–16 Atlantic 10 men's basketball standings
	Conf.				Overall
Team	W		L	PCT	W		L	PCT
Dayton	14	–	4	.778	25	–	8	.758
VCU	14	–	4	.778	25	–	11	.694
St. Bonaventure	14	–	4	.778	22	–	9	.710
Saint Joseph's †	13	–	5	.722	28	–	8	.778
George Washington	11	–	7	.611	28	–	10	.737
Davidson	10	–	8	.556	20	–	13	.606
Rhode Island	9	–	9	.500	17	–	15	.531
Fordham	8	–	10	.444	17	–	14	.548
Richmond	7	–	11	.389	16	–	16	.500
UMass	6	–	12	.333	14	–	18	.438
Duquesne	6	–	12	.333	17	–	17	.500
George Mason	5	–	13	.278	11	–	21	.344
Saint Louis	5	–	13	.278	11	–	21	.344
La Salle	4	–	14	.222	9	–	22	.290
† 2016 A10 Tournament winner

The 2016 Atlantic 10 men's basketball tournament was held March 9 through 13, 2016, at the Barclays Center in Brooklyn, New York. The champion earned an automatic bid to the 2016 NCAA tournament.

== Seeds ==
All 14 Atlantic 10 schools participate in the tournament. Teams will be seeded by the 2015–16 Atlantic 10 Conference season record. The top 10 teams received a first round bye and the top four teams received a double bye.

Teams were seeded by record within the conference, with a tiebreaker system to seed teams with identical conference records.

Seed	School	Conference	Tiebreaker
1	Dayton	14–4	2–1 vs. VCU & St. Bonaventure
2	VCU	14–4	1–1 vs. Dayton & St. Bonaventure
3	St. Bonaventure	14–4	1–2 vs. Dayton & VCU
4	Saint Joseph's	13–5	
5	George Washington	11–7	
6	Davidson	10–8	
7	Rhode Island	9–9	
8	Fordham	8–10	
9	Richmond	7–11	
10	Massachusetts	6–12	1–0 vs. Duquesne
11	Duquesne	6–12	0–1 vs. Massachusetts
12	George Mason	5–13	1–1 vs. Saint Louis, 0–1 vs. Dayton
13	Saint Louis	5–13	1–1 vs. George Mason, 0–2 vs. Dayton
14	La Salle	4–14	

== Schedule ==
Session	Game	Time*	Matchup^{#}	Television	Attendance
First round – Wednesday, March 9
1	1	6:30 pm	#13 Saint Louis 83 vs. #12 George Mason 78	ASN	5,523
1	2	9:00 pm	#14 La Salle 88 vs. #11 Duquesne 73	ASN	5,523
Second round – Thursday, March 10
2	3	12:00 pm	#9 Richmond 70 vs. #8 Fordham 55	NBCSN	6,519
2	4	2:30 pm	#13 Saint Louis 65 vs. #5 George Washington 73	NBCSN	6,519
3	5	6:30 pm	#10 Massachusetts 67 vs. #7 Rhode Island 62	NBCSN	5,507
3	6	9:00 pm	#14 La Salle 63 vs. #6 Davidson 78	NBCSN	5,507
Quarterfinals – Friday, March 11
4	7	12:00 pm	#9 Richmond 54 vs. #1 Dayton 69	NBCSN	7,509
4	8	2:30 pm	#5 George Washington 80 vs. #4 Saint Joseph's 86	NBCSN	7,509
5	9	6:30 pm	#10 Massachusetts 70 vs. #2 VCU 85	NBCSN	8,223
5	10	9:00 pm	#6 Davidson 90 vs. #3 St. Bonaventure 86 (OT)	NBCSN	8,223
Semifinals – Saturday, March 12
6	11	1:30 pm	#4 Saint Joseph's 82 vs. #1 Dayton 79	CBSSN	10,439
6	12	4:00 pm	#6 Davidson 54 vs. #2 VCU 76	CBSSN	10,439
Championship – Sunday, March 13
7	13	1:00 pm	#4 Saint Joseph's 87 vs. #2 VCU 74	CBS	8,413

*Game times in Eastern Time. #Rankings denote tournament seeding.

== Bracket ==
First round Wednesday, March 9 ASN
12	George Mason	78
13	Saint Louis	83
11	Duquesne	73
14	La Salle	88

Second round Thursday, March 10; NBCSN
8	Fordham	55
9	Richmond	70
5	George Washington	73
13	Saint Louis	65
7	Rhode Island	62
10	Massachusetts	67
6	Davidson	78
14	La Salle	63

Quarterfinals; Friday, March 11; NBCSN
1	Dayton	69
9	Richmond	54
4	Saint Joseph's	86
5	George Washington	80
2	VCU	85
10	Massachusetts	70
3	St. Bonaventure	86
6	Davidson	90*

Semifinals; Saturday, March 12; CBSSN
1	Dayton	79
4	Saint Joseph's	82
2	VCU	76
6	Davidson	54

Championship; Sunday, March 13; CBS
4	Saint Joseph's	87
2	VCU	74

* denotes overtime period

== See also ==
- 2016 Atlantic 10 women's basketball tournament
