= 2016–17 Marist Red Foxes men's basketball team =

American college basketball season

2016–17 Marist Red Foxes men's basketball
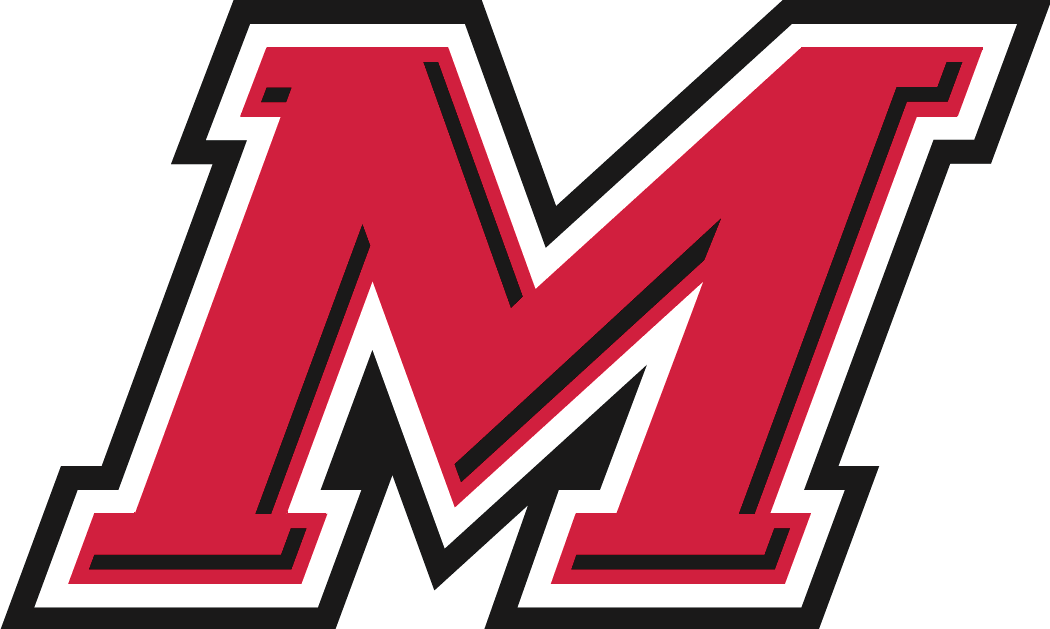
- Conference: Metro Atlantic Athletic Conference
- Record: 8–24 (5–15 MAAC)
- Head coach: Mike Maker (3rd season)
- Assistant coaches: Paul Lee; Andy Johnston; C. J. Lee
- Home arena: McCann Arena

2016–17 MAAC men's basketball standings
	Conf.				Overall
Team	W		L	PCT	W		L	PCT
Monmouth	18	–	2	.900	27	–	7	.794
Saint Peter's	14	–	6	.700	23	–	13	.639
Iona †	12	–	8	.600	22	–	13	.629
Siena	12	–	8	.600	17	–	17	.500
Fairfield	11	–	9	.550	16	–	15	.516
Rider	10	–	10	.500	18	–	15	.545
Canisius	10	–	10	.500	18	–	16	.529
Quinnipiac	7	–	13	.350	10	–	21	.323
Niagara	6	–	14	.300	10	–	23	.303
Marist	5	–	15	.250	8	–	24	.250
Manhattan	5	–	15	.250	10	–	22	.313
† 2017 MAAC tournament winner

The 2016–17 Marist Red Foxes men's basketball team represented Marist College during the 2016–17 NCAA Division I men's basketball season. The Red Foxes, led by third year head coach Mike Maker, played their home games at the McCann Arena in Poughkeepsie, New York as members of the Metro Atlantic Athletic Conference. They finished the season 8–24, 5–15 in MAAC play to finish in a tie for tenth place. They lost in the first round of the MAAC tournament to Canisius.

== Previous season ==
The Red Foxes finished the 2015–16 season 7–23, 4–16 in MAAC play to finish in eleventh place. They lost in the first round of the MAAC tournament to Manhattan.

== Roster ==
2016–17 Marist Red Foxes men's basketball team
Players
Coaches

Pos.	#	Name	Height	Weight	Year	Previous school	Hometown
G	0	Richie Mitchell	6 ft 1 in (1.85 m)	175 lb (79 kg)	So	Don Bosco Prep (IN); Weatherford College	Michigan City, Indiana
F	1	Kentrall Brooks	6 ft 8 in (2.03 m)	205 lb (93 kg)	Sr	St. Anthony (NJ)	Bronx, New York
G	2	Brian Parker	6 ft 2 in (1.88 m)	225 lb (102 kg)	So	Villa Angela-St. Joseph HS	Cleveland, Ohio
F	4	Isaiah Lamb	6 ft 4 in (1.93 m)	205 lb (93 kg)	So	Dulaney	Baltimore, Maryland
G	5	Khalid Hart	6 ft 2 in (1.88 m)	210 lb (95 kg)	RS Sr	Sanford School	Newark, Delaware
C	11	Tobias Sjoberg	6 ft 9 in (2.06 m)	210 lb (95 kg)	Fr	Malmö idrottsgymnasium	Malmö, Sweden
G/F	13	Kristinn Palsson	6 ft 6 in (1.98 m)	195 lb (88 kg)	So	Marymount	Reykjanesbær, Iceland
F	14	Aleksandar Dozic (redshirt)	6 ft 9 in (2.06 m)	220 lb (100 kg)	So	Don Bosco Prep (IN); Marshall	Podgorica, Montenegro
F	15	Obi Momah	6 ft 7 in (2.01 m)	230 lb (104 kg)	Jr	Farmington	Farmington, Connecticut
G	21	Kyle Daugherty	6 ft 4 in (1.93 m)	180 lb (82 kg)	So	Phillips Exeter Academy	Reno, Nevada
C	25	Connor McClenaghan	6 ft 9 in (2.06 m)	215 lb (98 kg)	Jr	Hebron	Carrollton, Texas
G/F	30	Ryan Funk	6 ft 6 in (1.98 m)	190 lb (86 kg)	So	St. Thomas More Prep	Clarence, New York
G/F	34	David Knudsen	6 ft 4 in (1.93 m)	205 lb (93 kg)	So	Falkonergardens	Copenhagen, Denmark

Head coach

- Mike Maker (Cal Baptist)

Assistant coach(es)

- Paul Lee (Columbia)
- Andy Johnston (New Hampshire)
- C.J. Lee (Michigan)

Legend

- (C) Team captain
- (S) Suspended
- (I) Ineligible
- (W) Walk-on
- Injured
- Current redshirt

Roster
Last update: 2015-11-13

== Schedule and results ==
Date time, TV	Rank^{#}	Opponent^{#}	Result	Record	Site (attendance) city, state
Regular season
11/11/2016*; 7:00 pm, ACCN Extra		at No. 1 Duke; Hall of Fame Tip Off	L 49–94	0–1	Cameron Indoor Stadium (9,314); Durham, NC
11/14/2016*; 7:00 pm		at No. 21 Rhode Island; Hall of Fame Tip Off	L 65–107	0–2	Ryan Center (4,021); Kingston, RI
11/16/2016*; 7:00 pm		Vermont	W 76–72	0–3	McCann Arena (1,112); Poughkeepsie, NY
11/19/2016*; 5:30 pm, ESPN3		vs. Brown; Hall of Fame Tip Off	W 87–79	1–3	Mohegan Sun Arena; Uncasville, CT
11/21/2016*; 6:00 pm, ESPN3		vs. Grand Canyon; Hall of Fame Tip Off	L 72–84	1–4	Mohegan Sun Arena (9,119); Uncasville, CT
11/26/2016*; 3:00 pm		at Dartmouth	W 75–69	2–4	Leede Arena (1,215); Hanover, NH
11/29/2016*; 7:00 pm		UMass Lowell	W 81–69	3–4	McCann Arena (1,008); Poughkeepsie, NY
12/02/2016; 7:00 pm		Niagara	W 72–66	4–4 (1–0)	McCann Arena (1,355); Poughkeepsie, NY
12/04/2016; 2:00 pm		at Quinnipiac	L 63–77	4–5 (1–1)	TD Bank Sports Center (886); Hamden, CT
12/07/2016*; 7:00 pm		at Albany	L 66–78	4–6	SEFCU Arena (2,651); Albany, NY
12/10/2016*; 1:00 pm		Jacksonville	L 64–85	4–7	McCann Arena (1,085); Poughkeepsie, NY
12/20/2016*; 7:00 pm		at Delaware	W 59–56	4–8	Bob Carpenter Center (1,885); Newark, DE
12/23/2016*; 12:05 pm		at Holy Cross	L 59–68	4–9	Hart Center (1,367); Worcester, MA
12/31/2016; 1:00 pm, ESPN3		at Iona	L 80–93	4–10 (1-2)	Hynes Athletic Center (1,804); New Rochelle, NY
01/02/2017; 7:00 pm		Manhattan	W 90–88 ^{OT}	5–10 (2–2)	McCann Arena; Poughkeepsie, NY
01/06/2017; 7:00 pm, ESPNU/ESPN3		Rider	L 62–73	5–11 (2–3)	McCann Arena (1,001); Poughkeepsie, NY
01/08/2017; 2:00 pm, ESPN3		at Monmouth	L 64–71	5–12 (2–4)	OceanFirst Bank Center (2,428); West Long Branch, NJ
01/14/2017; 2:00 pm, ESPN3		at Canisius	L 58–91	5–13 (2–5)	Koessler Athletic Center (1,524); Buffalo, NY
01/16/2017; 7:00 pm, LCTV		at Niagara	W 93–87 ^{OT}	6–13 (3–5)	Gallagher Center (1,017); Lewiston, NY
01/21/2017; 7:00 pm		at Rider	L 66–84	6–14 (3–6)	Alumni Gymnasium (1,650); Lawrenceville, NJ
01/26/2017; 7:00 pm, ESPN3		Saint Peter's	L 65–81	6–15 (3–7)	McCann Arena (888); Poughkeepsie, NY
01/28/2017; 1:00 pm		at Fairfield	L 62–72	6–16 (3–8)	Webster Bank Arena (3,004); Bridgeport, CT
01/30/2017; 7:00 pm		Monmouth	L 71–83	6–17 (3–9)	McCann Arena (1,308); Poughkeepsie, NY
02/04/2017; 7:00 pm		at Manhattan	L 67–68	6–18 (3–10)	Draddy Gymnasium (1,005); Riverdale, NY
02/09/2017; 7:00 pm		Fairfield	L 53–73	6–19 (3–11)	McCann Arena (819); Poughkeepsie, NY
02/11/2017; 7:00 pm		Siena	L 77–84	6–20 (3–12)	Webster Bank Arena (1,634); Bridgeport, CT
02/14/2017; 7:30 pm		at Saint Peter's	L 46–71	6–21 (3–13)	Yanitelli Center; Jersey City, NJ
02/17/2017; 7:00 pm		Iona	L 88–95	6–22 (3–14)	McCann Arena (1,527); Poughkeepsie, NY
02/19/2017; 2:00 pm		Canisius	W 76–74	7–22 (4–14)	McCann Arena (1,381); Poughkeepsie, NY
02/23/2017; 7:30 pm, ESPN3		Quinnipiac	W 87–74	8–22 (5–14)	McCann Arena (1,031); Poughkeepsie, NY
02/26/2017; 4:00 pm, ESPN3		at Siena	L 64–80	8–23 (5–15)	Times Union Center (7,378); Albany, NY
MAAC tournament
03/02/2017; 7:00 pm, ESPN3	(10)	vs. (7) Canisius; First Round	L 73–77	8–24	Times Union Center (2,406); Albany, NY
*Non-conference game. ^{#}Rankings from AP Poll. (#) Tournament seedings in parentheses. All times are in Eastern Time Source.
