= 2016–17 Iona Gaels men's basketball team =

American college basketball season

2016–17 Iona Gaels men's basketball
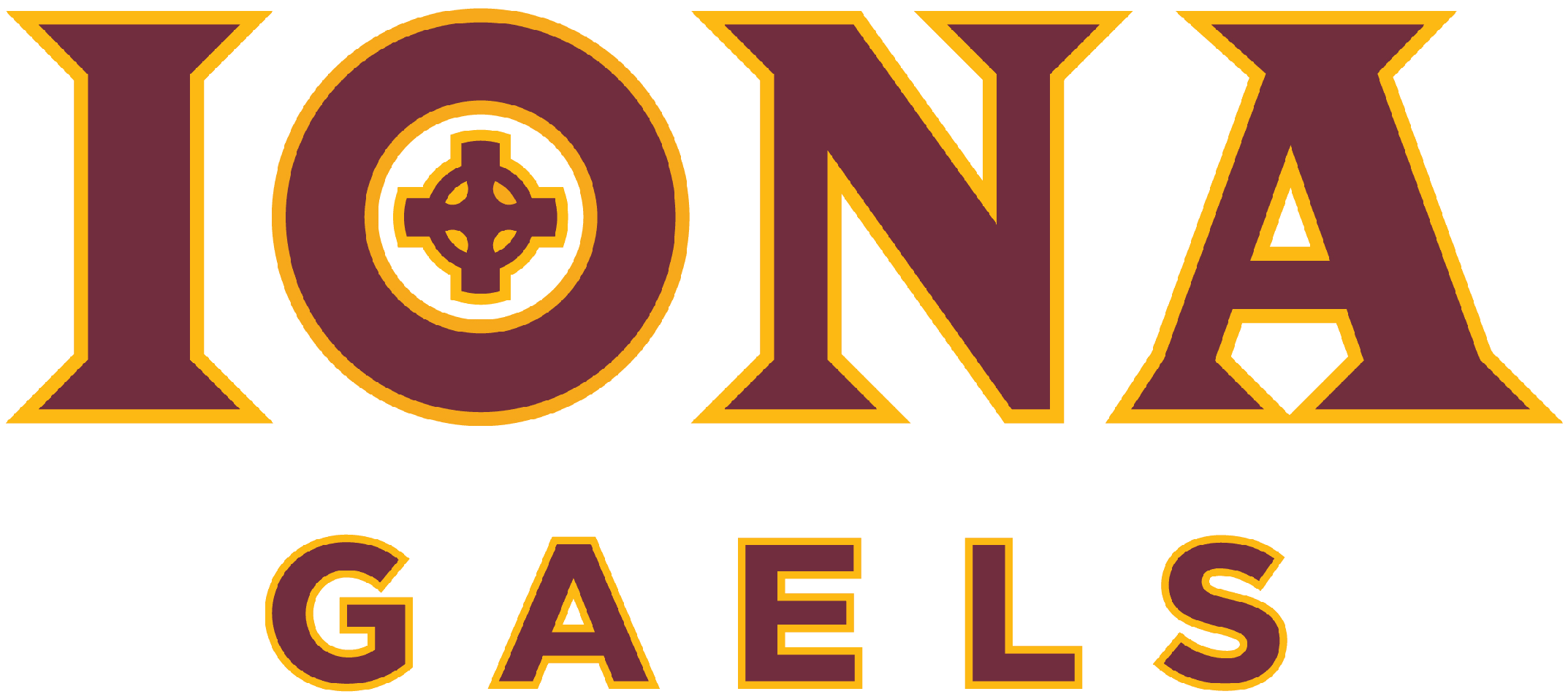

MAAC tournament champions Great Alaska Shootout champions

NCAA tournament, First Round
- Conference: Metro Atlantic Athletic Conference
- Record: 22–13 (12–8 MAAC)
- Head coach: Tim Cluess (7th season)
- Assistant coaches: Jared Grasso; Brock Erickson; Mark Calzonetti
- Home arena: Hynes Athletic Center

2016–17 MAAC men's basketball standings
	Conf.				Overall
Team	W		L	PCT	W		L	PCT
Monmouth	18	–	2	.900	27	–	7	.794
Saint Peter's	14	–	6	.700	23	–	13	.639
Iona †	12	–	8	.600	22	–	13	.629
Siena	12	–	8	.600	17	–	17	.500
Fairfield	11	–	9	.550	16	–	15	.516
Rider	10	–	10	.500	18	–	15	.545
Canisius	10	–	10	.500	18	–	16	.529
Quinnipiac	7	–	13	.350	10	–	21	.323
Niagara	6	–	14	.300	10	–	23	.303
Marist	5	–	15	.250	8	–	24	.250
Manhattan	5	–	15	.250	10	–	22	.313
† 2017 MAAC tournament winner

The 2016–17 Iona Gaels men's basketball team represented Iona College during the 2016–17 NCAA Division I men's basketball season. The Gaels, led by seventh year head coach Tim Cluess, played their home games at the Hynes Athletic Center in New Rochelle, New York as members of the Metro Atlantic Athletic Conference (MAAC). They finished the season 22–13, 12–8 in MAAC play to finish in a tie for third place. They defeated Rider, Saint Peter's and Siena to be champions of the MAAC tournament. They received the MAAC's automatic bid to the NCAA tournament where they lost in the first round to Oregon.

== Previous season ==
The Gaels finished the 2015–16 season 22–11, 16–4 in MAAC play to finish in second place. They defeated Canisius, Siena, and Monmouth to win the MAAC tournament and earn the conference's automatic bid to the NCAA tournament. As a No. 13 seed in the Tournament, they lost in the first round to Iowa State.

== Roster ==
2016–17 Iona Gaels men's basketball team
Players
Coaches

Pos.	#	Name	Height	Weight	Year	Previous school	Hometown
G	0	Rickey McGill	6 ft 1 in (1.85 m)	175 lb (79 kg)	So	Spring Valley	Spring Valley, New York
G	1	Sam Cassell, Jr.	6 ft 4 in (1.93 m)	190 lb (86 kg)	RS Sr	Notre Dame Prep; Connecticut	Baltimore, Maryland
G/F	2	E. J. Crawford	6 ft 6 in (1.98 m)	210 lb (95 kg)	Fr	St. Thomas More; Simsbury	Hartford, Connecticut
G	4	Schadrac Casimir	5 ft 10 in (1.78 m)	165 lb (75 kg)	So	Trinity Catholic; South Kent School	Stamford, Connecticut
G	10	Jon Severe	6 ft 2 in (1.88 m)	195 lb (88 kg)	Sr	Christ the King; Fordham	Brooklyn, New York
G	13	DeAndre Turner	6 ft 3 in (1.91 m)	215 lb (98 kg)	Jr	Winter Park; Broward	Harrisburg, Pennsylvania
F	15	Deyshonee Much	6 ft 5 in (1.96 m)	170 lb (77 kg)	Jr	Redemption Christ Academy; Buffalo	Rochester, New York
G/F	20	Jan Svandrlik	6 ft 7 in (2.01 m)	210 lb (95 kg)	Jr	Canarias Basketball Acad. Indian Hills	Plzeň, Czech Republic
G	22	Taylor Bessick	6 ft 9 in (2.06 m)	250 lb (113 kg)	Sr	Rise Academy; James Madison	Philadelphia, Pennsylvania
F	23	Jordan Washington	6 ft 8 in (2.03 m)	235 lb (107 kg)	Sr	Pathways; Indian Hills	Jamaica, New York
F	44	Tyrell Williams	6 ft 9 in (2.06 m)	250 lb (113 kg)	So	Norland; Western Nebraska	Miami, Florida

Head coach

- Tim Cluess (Hofstra)

Assistant coach(es)

- Jared Grasso (Quinnipiac)
- Brock Erickson (Assumption (MA))
- Mark Calzonetti (Bentley)

Legend

- (C) Team captain
- (S) Suspended
- (I) Ineligible
- (W) Walk-on
- Injured
- Current redshirt

Roster

== Schedule and results ==
Date time, TV	Rank^{#}	Opponent^{#}	Result	Record	Site (attendance) city, state
Regular season
11/15/2016*; 7:00 pm, ACCN Extra		at Florida State	L 78–99	0–1	Donald L. Tucker Center (4,530); Tallahassee, FL
11/20/2016*; 8:00 pm		at Nevada; Great Alaska Shootout Opening Round	L 76–91	0–2	Lawlor Events Center (6,375); Reno, NV
11/24/2016*; 9:30 pm, CBSSN		vs. Drake; Great Alaska Shootout quarterfinals	W 64–53	1–2	Alaska Airlines Center (2,039); Anchorange, AK
11/26/2016*; 12:00 am, CBSSN		vs. Weber State; Great Alaska Shootout semifinals	W 76–54	2–2	Alaska Airlines Center (2,851); Anchorage, AK
11/27/2016*; 12:30 am, CBSSN		vs. Nevada; Great Alaska Shootout championship	W 75–73	3–2	Alaska Airlines Center (3,233); Anchorage, AK
12/02/2016; 7:00 pm		at Saint Peter's	W 79–65	4–2 (1–0)	Yanitelli Center; Jersey City, NJ
12/04/2016; 4:00 pm, ESPN3		Niagara	L 58–74	4–3 (1–1)	Hynes Athletic Center (1,667); New Rochelle, NY
12/07/2016*; 7:00 pm		at Fairleigh Dickinson	W 90–73	5–3	Rothman Center (1,257); Hackensack, NJ
12/10/2016*; 2:00 pm, ESPN3		Ohio	W 79–75	6–3	Hynes Athletic Center (1,751); New Rochelle, NY
12/14/2016*; 7:00 pm, ESPN3		NJIT	W 94–80	7–3	Hynes Athletic Center (1,107); New Rochelle, NY
12/21/2016*; 3:15 pm		vs. UC Santa Barbara; Las Vegas Holiday Hoops Classic	W 73–57	8–3	South Point Arena (175); Enterprise, NV
12/22/2016*; 3:00 pm		vs. Towson; Las Vegas Holiday Hoops Classic	L 69–76	8–4	South Point Arena (581); Enterprise, NV
12/28/2016*; 3:00 pm		at Delaware	L 54–63	8–5	Bob Carpenter Center (1,776); Newark, DE
12/31/2016; 1:00 pm, ESPN3		Marist	W 93–80	9–5 (2–1)	Hynes Athletic Center (1,804); New Rochelle, NY
01/02/2017; 7:00 pm		at Fairfield	L 87–93	9–6 (2–2)	Webster Bank Arena (2,004); Bridgeport, CT
01/06/2017; 7:00 pm, ESPNU		at Monmouth	L 74–92	9–7 (2–3)	OceanFirst Bank Center (3,105); West Long Branch, NJ
01/08/2017; 4:00 pm, ESPN3		Canisius	W 98–75	10–7 (3–3)	Hynes Athletic Center (1,650); New Rochelle, NY
01/14/2017; 7:00 pm, ESPN3		at Quinnipiac	L 91–97 ^{OT}	10–8 (3–4)	TD Bank Sports Center (1,537); Hamden, CT
01/17/2017; 7:00 pm		at Manhattan	W 82–67	11–8 (4–4)	Draddy Gymnasium (1,549); Riverdale, NY
01/20/2017; 7:00 pm, ESPN3		Fairfield	W 96–89	12–8 (5–4)	Hynes Athletic Center (1,820); New Rochelle, NY
01/23/2017; 7:00 pm, ESPN3		Quinnipiac	W 84–74	13–8 (6–4)	Hynes Athletic Center (1,191); New Rochelle, NY
01/27/2017; 7:00 pm, ESPN3		at Siena	W 77–66	14–8 (7–4)	Times Union Center (6,826); Albany, NY
01/29/2017; 4:00 pm, ESPN3		at Saint Peter's	W 69–66 ^{OT}	15–8 (8–4)	Hynes Athletic Center (1,690); New Rochelle, NY
02/03/2017; 7:00 pm, ESPNU		at Rider	W 95–76	16–8 (9–4)	Alumni Gymnasium (1,650); Lawrenceville, NJ
02/07/2017; 7:00 pm, ESPN3		Siena	L 79–81	16–9 (9–5)	Hynes Athletic Center (1,518); New Rochelle, NY
02/12/2017; 2:00 pm		at Niagara	W 90–76	17–9 (10–5)	Gallagher Center (1,174); Lewiston, NY
02/14/2017; 7:00 pm, ESPN3		at Canisius	L 83–89	17–10 (10–6)	Koessler Athletic Center (2,150); Buffalo, NY
02/17/2017; 7:00 pm		at Marist	W 95–88	18–10 (11–6)	McCann Field House (1,527); Poughkeepsie, NY
02/19/2017; 5:00 pm, ESPN3		Rider	L 85–103	18–11 (11–7)	Hynes Athletic Center (1,925); New Rochelle, NY
02/24/2017; 9:00 pm, ESPNU		Manhattan	W 72–51	19–11 (12–7)	Hynes Athletic Center (2,611); New Rochelle, NY
02/26/2017; 4:00 pm, ESPN3		Monmouth	L 73–79	19–12 (12–8)	Hynes Athletic Center (2,611); New Rochelle, NY
MAAC tournament
03/04/2017; 7:00 pm, ESPN3	(3)	vs. (6) Rider; Quarterfinals	W 88–70	20–12	Times Union Center (4,735); Albany, NY
03/05/2017; 7:00 pm, ESPN3	(3)	vs. (2) Saint Peter's; Semifinals	W 73–65	21–12	Times Union Center; Albany, NY
03/06/2017; 9:00 pm, ESPN2	(3)	at (4) Siena; Championship	W 87–86 ^{OT}	22–12	Times Union Center (7,608); Albany, NY
NCAA tournament
03/17/2017; 2:00 pm, TBS	(14 MW)	vs. (3 MW) No. 9 Oregon; First Round	L 77–93	22–13	Golden 1 Center (15,833); Sacramento, CA
*Non-conference game. ^{#}Rankings from AP Poll. (#) Tournament seedings in parentheses. MW=Midwest Region. All times are in Eastern Time Source.
