= 2016–17 Fairfield Stags men's basketball team =

American college basketball season

2016–17 Fairfield Stags men's basketball
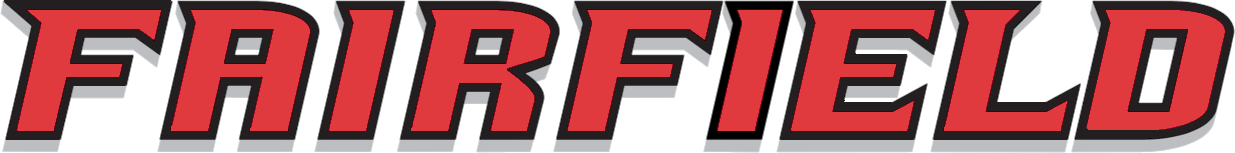

CIT, First Round
- Conference: Metro Atlantic Athletic Conference
- Record: 16–15 (11–9 MAAC)
- Head coach: Sydney Johnson (6th season)
- Assistant coaches: Mitch Buonaguro; Tom Parrotta; Tyson Wheeler
- Home arena: Webster Bank Arena; Alumni Hall

2016–17 MAAC men's basketball standings
	Conf.				Overall
Team	W		L	PCT	W		L	PCT
Monmouth	18	–	2	.900	27	–	7	.794
Saint Peter's	14	–	6	.700	23	–	13	.639
Iona †	12	–	8	.600	22	–	13	.629
Siena	12	–	8	.600	17	–	17	.500
Fairfield	11	–	9	.550	16	–	15	.516
Rider	10	–	10	.500	18	–	15	.545
Canisius	10	–	10	.500	18	–	16	.529
Quinnipiac	7	–	13	.350	10	–	21	.323
Niagara	6	–	14	.300	10	–	23	.303
Marist	5	–	15	.250	8	–	24	.250
Manhattan	5	–	15	.250	10	–	22	.313
† 2017 MAAC tournament winner

The 2016–17 Fairfield Stags men's basketball team represented Fairfield University during the 2016–17 NCAA Division I men's basketball season. The Stags, led by sixth-year head coach Sydney Johnson, played their home games at Webster Bank Arena with two games at Alumni Hall in Bridgeport, Connecticut as members of the Metro Atlantic Athletic Conference. They finished the season 16–15, 11–9 in MAAC play to finish in fifth place. As the No. 5 seed in the MAAC tournament, they lost in the quarterfinals to Siena. They were invited to the CollegeInsider.com Tournament where they lost in the first round to UMBC.

== Previous season ==
The Stags finished the 2015–16 season 19–14, 12–8 in MAAC play to finish in a tie for fourth place. They defeated Saint Peter's in the quarterfinals of the MAAC tournament before losing to Monmouth in the semifinals. They were invited to the CollegeInsider.com Tournament where they lost in the first round to New Hampshire.

== Roster ==
2016–17 Fairfield Stags men's basketball team
Players
Coaches

Pos.	#	Name	Height	Weight	Year	Hometown
G/F	0	Olivier Cadieux	6 ft 4 in (1.93 m)	205 lb (93 kg)	Fr	Montreal, Canada
G	1	Jerome Segura	5 ft 11 in (1.8 m)	175 lb (79 kg)	Jr	Houston, Texas
G	2	Jerry Johnson Jr.	6 ft 2 in (1.88 m)	210 lb (95 kg)	So	Memphis, Tennessee
G	3	Tyler Nelson	6 ft 3 in (1.91 m)	180 lb (82 kg)	Jr	Bradford, Massachusetts
G	4	Jared Harper	6 ft 1 in (1.85 m)	180 lb (82 kg)	Jr	Beverly Hills, California
G	10	Thomas Nolan	6 ft 3 in (1.91 m)	195 lb (88 kg)	So	Trumbull, Connecticut
C	11	Deniz Celen	6 ft 8 in (2.03 m)	240 lb (109 kg)	Fr	Ankara, Turkey
F	13	Jonathan Kasibabu	6 ft 8 in (2.03 m)	240 lb (109 kg)	So	Kinshasa, Democratic Republic of the Congo
F	14	Matija Milin	6 ft 9 in (2.06 m)	215 lb (98 kg)	So	Belgrade, Serbia
F/C	15	Nemanja Zubec	6 ft 9 in (2.06 m)	190 lb (86 kg)	Fr	Novi Sad, Serbia
F	21	Amadou Sidibe	6 ft 8 in (2.03 m)	225 lb (102 kg)	GS	Bronx, New York
F	25	Steve Smith	6 ft 7 in (2.01 m)	210 lb (95 kg)	Sr	Gwynedd Valley, Pennsylvania
G	30	Andrew Leone	5 ft 6 in (1.68 m)	160 lb (73 kg)	Sr	New York, New York
G	33	Curtis Cobb	6 ft 5 in (1.96 m)	185 lb (84 kg)	So	Fall River, Massachusetts

Head coach

- Sydney Johnson (Princeton)

Assistant coach(es)

- Mitch Buonaguro (Boston College)
- Tom Parrotta (Fordham)
- Tyson Wheeler (Rhode Island)

Legend

- (C) Team captain
- (S) Suspended
- (I) Ineligible
- (W) Walk-on
- Injured
- Current redshirt

Roster

== Schedule and results ==
Date time, TV	Rank^{#}	Opponent^{#}	Result	Record	Site (attendance) city, state
Exhibition
11/04/2016*; 7:00 pm		Bridgeport	W 91–59		Alumni Hall (1,972); Fairfield, CT
Regular season
11/11/2016*; 7:00 pm, ESPN3		Sacred Heart	W 85–63	1–0	Webster Bank Arena (3,043); Bridgeport, CT
11/15/2016*; 7:00 pm		at Dartmouth	W 79–62	2–0	Leede Arena (433); Hanover, NH
11/19/2016*; 4:00 pm		at Wagner	W 70–64	3–0	Spiro Sports Center (1,635); Staten Island, NY
11/23/2016*; 1:00 pm		at Loyola (MD)	L 66–81	3–1	Reitz Arena (367); Baltimore, MD
11/26/2016*; 2:00 pm		Army	W 75–74	4–1	Webster Bank Arena (1,083); Bridgeport, CT
12/01/2016; 7:00 pm		at Rider	W 76–67	5–1 (1–0)	Alumni Gymnasium (1,622); Lawrenceville, NJ
12/03/2016; 7:00 pm		at Siena	L 73–80	5–2 (1–1)	Times Union Center (5,515); Albany, NY
12/06/2016*; 7:00 pm, SNY		Bucknell	L 64–75	5–3	Webster Bank Arena (1,403); Bridgeport, CT
12/18/2016*; 2:00 pm		at NC State	L 78–99	5–4	PNC Arena (15,564); Raleigh, NC
12/21/2016*; 6:00 pm, CBSSN		vs. Boston College; Hall of Fame's Birthday of Basketball	W 89–83	6–4	MassMutual Center; Springfield, MA
12/30/2016*; 7:00 pm		at Penn	L 68–74	6–5	Palestra (2,304); Philadelphia, PA
01/02/2017; 7:00 pm		Iona	W 93–87	7–5 (2–1)	Webster Bank Arena (2,004); Bridgeport, CT
01/05/2017; 8:00 pm, ESPN3		at Manhattan	W 97–79	8–5 (3–1)	Draddy Gymnasium (823); Riverdale, NY
01/10/2017; 7:00 pm		Canisius	L 72–86	8–6 (3–2)	Webster Bank Arena (1,112); Bridgeport, CT
01/15/2017; 2:00 pm, SNY		Siena	L 54–63	8–7 (3–3)	Webster Bank Arena (2,611); Bridgeport, CT
01/17/2017; 7:00 pm		at Saint Peter's	L 55–69	8–8 (3–4)	OceanFirst Bank Center; West Long Branch, NY
01/20/2017; 7:00 pm, ESPN3		at Iona	L 89–96	8–9 (3–5)	Hynes Athletic Center (1,820); New Rochelle, NY
01/22/2017; 2:00 pm, ESPN3		at Monmouth	L 49–91	8–10 (3–6)	OceanFirst Bank Center (2,793); West Long Branch, NY
01/28/2017; 1:00 pm		Marist	W 72–62	9–10 (4–6)	Webster Bank Arena (3,004); Bridgeport, CT
01/31/2017; 7:00 pm		Manhattan	W 78–49	10–10 (5–6)	Webster Bank Arena (859); Bridgeport, CT
02/02/2017; 8:00 pm, ESPN3		Niagara	W 81–61	11–10 (6–6)	Webster Bank Arena (1,051); Bridgeport, CT
02/06/2017; 7:00 pm, ESPN3		Quinnipiac	L 71–73	11–11 (6–7)	Webster Bank Arena (1,071); Bridgeport, CT
02/09/2017; 7:00 pm		at Marist	W 73–53	12–11 (7–7)	McCann Field House (819); Poughkeepsie, NY
02/13/2017; 7:00 pm, ESPN3		Rider	W 69–67	13–11 (8–7)	Alumni Hall (1,592); Fairfield, CT
02/17/2017; 9:00 pm, ESPNU		at Quinnipiac	W 89–86 ^{OT}	14–11 (9–7)	TD Bank Sports Center (1,312); Hamden, CT
02/19/2017; 2:00 pm		Saint Peter's	L 55–74	14–12 (9–8)	Webster Bank Arena (862); Bridgeport, CT
02/21/2017; 7:00 pm, SNY		Monmouth	L 62–82	14–13 (9–9)	Webster Bank Arena (1,816); Bridgeport, CT
02/24/2017; 7:00 pm, ESPN3		at Canisius	W 58–55	15–13 (10–9)	Koessler Athletic Center (1,299); Buffalo, NY
02/26/2017; 2:00 pm		at Niagara	W 62–58	16–13 (11–9)	Gallagher Center (1,078); Lewiston, NY
MAAC tournament
03/04/2017; 9:30 pm, ESPN3	(5)	at (4) Siena; Quarterfinals	L 66–78	16–14	Times Union Center (4,735); Albany, NY
CIT
03/15/2017*; 7:00 pm, Facebook Live		at UMBC; First Round	L 83–88	16–15	Retriever Activities Center (688); Catonsville, MD
*Non-conference game. ^{#}Rankings from AP Poll. (#) Tournament seedings in parentheses. All times are in Eastern Time.
