= 2016–17 Manhattan Jaspers basketball team =

American college basketball season

2016–17 Manhattan Jaspers basketball
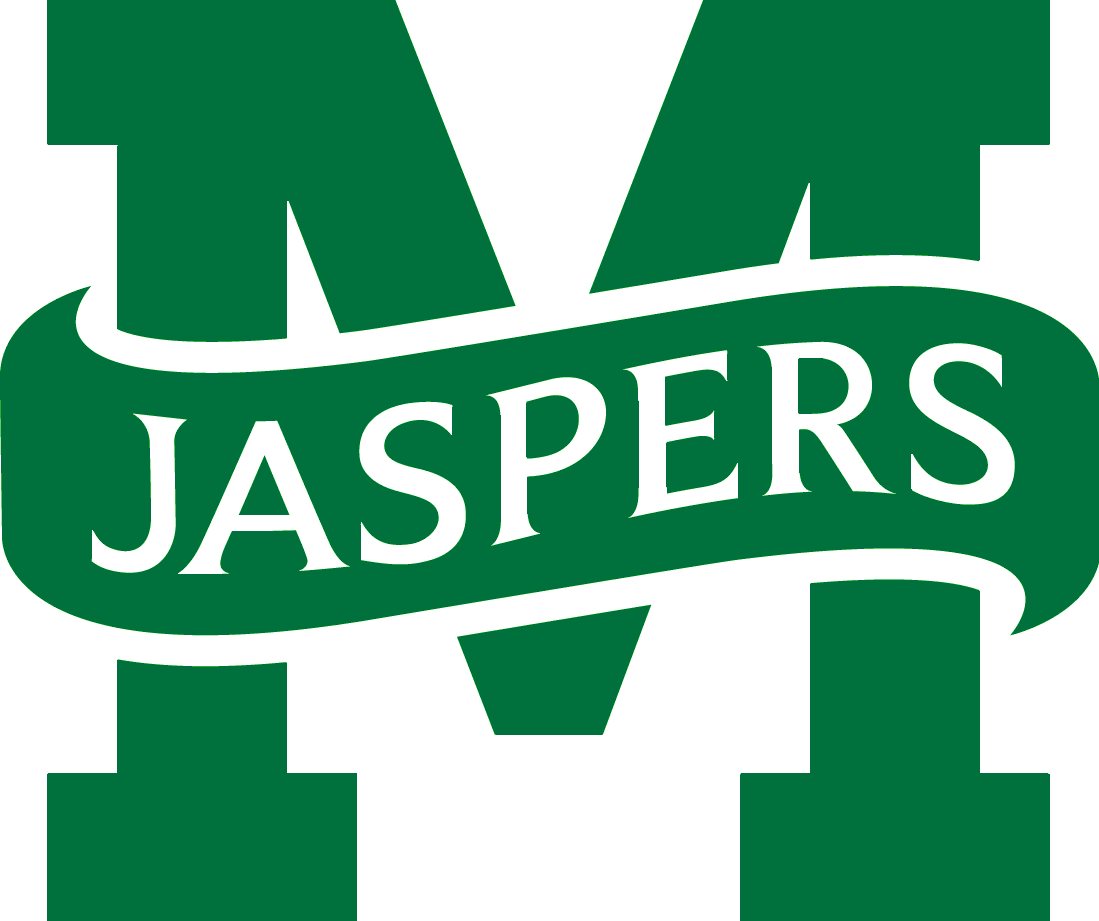
- Conference: Metro Atlantic Athletic Conference
- Record: 10–22 (5–15 MAAC)
- Head coach: Steve Masiello (6th season)
- Assistant coaches: Matt Grady; Shawn Finney; Branden McDonald
- Home arena: Draddy Gymnasium

2016–17 MAAC men's basketball standings
	Conf.				Overall
Team	W		L	PCT	W		L	PCT
Monmouth	18	–	2	.900	27	–	7	.794
Saint Peter's	14	–	6	.700	23	–	13	.639
Iona †	12	–	8	.600	22	–	13	.629
Siena	12	–	8	.600	17	–	17	.500
Fairfield	11	–	9	.550	16	–	15	.516
Rider	10	–	10	.500	18	–	15	.545
Canisius	10	–	10	.500	18	–	16	.529
Quinnipiac	7	–	13	.350	10	–	21	.323
Niagara	6	–	14	.300	10	–	23	.303
Marist	5	–	15	.250	8	–	24	.250
Manhattan	5	–	15	.250	10	–	22	.313
† 2017 MAAC tournament winner

The 2016–17 Manhattan Jaspers basketball team represented Manhattan College during the 2016–17 NCAA Division I men's basketball season. The Jaspers, led by sixth-year head coach Steve Masiello, played their home games at Draddy Gymnasium in Riverdale, New York as members of the Metro Atlantic Athletic Conference. They finished the season 10–22, 5–15 in MAAC play to finish in a tie for tenth place. They lost in the first round of the MAAC tournament to Rider.

== Previous season ==
The Jaspers finished the 2015–16 season 13–18, 9–11 in MAAC play to finish in sixth place. They defeated Marist in the first round of the MAAC tournament before losing to Siena in the quarterfinals.

== Roster ==
2016–17 Manhattan Jaspers men's basketball team
Players
Coaches

Pos.	#	Name	Height	Weight	Year	Hometown
G	0	Na'Quan Council	6 ft 0 in (1.83 m)	160 lb (73 kg)	Fr	Blackwood, New Jersey
C	1	Ak Ojo	6 ft 10 in (2.08 m)	220 lb (100 kg)	So	Lagos, Nigeria
G	3	Zavier Turner	5 ft 9 in (1.75 m)	170 lb (77 kg)	RS Jr	Indianapolis, Indiana
F	4	Zane Waterman	6 ft 9 in (2.06 m)	220 lb (100 kg)	Jr	Winston-Salem, North Carolina
G	5	Tyler Wilson	6 ft 0 in (1.83 m)	175 lb (79 kg)	Sr	Bronx, New York
G	11	Aaron Walker Jr.	6 ft 2 in (1.88 m)	190 lb (86 kg)	Fr	Brooklyn, New York
F	12	Zavier Peart	6 ft 10 in (2.08 m)	270 lb (122 kg)	Jr	Miami, Florida
F	14	Calvin Crawford	6 ft 8 in (2.03 m)	205 lb (93 kg)	RS Jr	Middletown, New York
C	15	Ahmed Ismail	7 ft 2 in (2.18 m)	285 lb (129 kg)	Jr	Cairo, Egypt
G	20	Sky Williams	6 ft 2 in (1.88 m)	185 lb (84 kg)	Sr	Tuckahoe, New York
G	21	Matt Maloney	6 ft 1 in (1.85 m)	170 lb (77 kg)	So	Somers, New York
G	22	Thomas Capuano	6 ft 0 in (1.83 m)	180 lb (82 kg)	So	Hastings-on-Hudson, New York
G	23	Rich Williams	6 ft 5 in (1.96 m)	190 lb (86 kg)	Sr	Brooklyn, New York
F	35	Oliver Ehrnvall	6 ft 7 in (2.01 m)	210 lb (95 kg)	Fr	Uppsala, Sweden
G	52	Samson Usilo	6 ft 4 in (1.93 m)	205 lb (93 kg)	RS So	Lagos, Nigeria

Head coach

- Steve Masiello (Kentucky)

Assistant coach(es)

- Matt Grady (Saint Joseph's)
- Shawn Finney (Fairmont State)
- Branden McDonald (Virginia Union)

Legend

- (C) Team captain
- (S) Suspended
- (I) Ineligible
- (W) Walk-on
- Injured
- Current redshirt

Roster

== Schedule and results ==
Date time, TV	Rank^{#}	Opponent^{#}	Result	Record	Site (attendance) city, state
Regular season
11/11/2016*; 7:00 pm		at Bucknell	L 64–76	0–1	Sojka Pavilion (2,763); Lewisburg, PA
11/15/2016*; 8:45 am, ESPN2		Winthrop; NIT Season Tip-Off	L 81–94	0–2	Draddy Gymnasium (1,051); Riverdale, NY
11/18/2016*; 7:00 pm		Hofstra	W 80–68	1–2	Draddy Gymnasium (1,109); Riverdale, NY
11/20/2016*; 2:00 pm, ESPN3		at Temple; NIT Season Tip-Off	L 67–88	1–3	Liacouras Center (5,156); Philadelphia, PA
11/26/2016*; 2:00 pm		at Detroit; NIT Season Tip-Off	W 84–81 ^{2OT}	2–3	Calihan Hall (1,012); Detroit, MI
11/28/2016*; 7:00 pm, RTPT		at No. 25 West Virginia; NIT Season Tip-Off	L 61–108	2–4	WVU Coliseum (8,190); Morgantown, WV
12/02/2016; 7:00 pm		Canisius	L 76–77	2–5 (0–1)	Draddy Gymnasium (1,275); Riverdale, NY
12/04/2016; 2:00 pm		at Saint Peter's	L 70–84	2–6 (0–2)	Yanitelli Center; Jersey City, NJ
12/06/2016*; 7:00 pm		at Morgan State	L 82–85 ^{OT}	2–7	Talmadge L. Hill Field House (1,432); Baltimore, MD
12/10/2016*; 7:00 pm		Fordham; Battle of the Bronx	W 60–53	3–7	Draddy Gymnasium (1,981); Riverdale, NY
12/17/2016*; 1:30 pm, FS2		vs. No. 23 Florida State; Orange Bowl Basketball Classic	L 67–83	3–8	BB&T Center; Sunrise, FL
12/20/2016*; 7:00 pm		at St. Francis Brooklyn	W 61–54	4–8	Generoso Pope Athletic Complex (443); Brooklyn, NY
12/22/2016*; 7:00 pm		Eastern Kentucky	W 81–54	5–8	Draddy Gymnasium (925); Riverdale, NY
01/02/2017; 7:00 pm		at Marist	L 88–90 ^{OT}	5–9 (0–3)	McCann Field House; Poughkeepsie, NY
01/05/2017; 8:00 pm, ESPN3		Fairfield	L 79–97	5–10 (0–4)	Draddy Gymnasium (823); Riverdale, NY
01/07/2017; 2:00 pm		at Quinnipiac	L 72–81	5–11 (0–5)	TD Bank Sports Center (1,003); Hamden, CT
01/10/2017; 7:00 pm		Niagara	W 78–69	6–11 (1–5)	Draddy Gymnasium (525); Riverdale, NY
01/13/2017; 9:00 pm, ESPNU		Rider	W 76–73	7–11 (2–5)	Draddy Gymnasium (675); Riverdale, NY
01/17/2017; 7:00 pm		Iona	L 67–82	7–12 (2–6)	Draddy Gymnasium (1,549); Riverdale, NY
01/20/2017; 9:00 pm, ESPN3		at Monmouth	L 71–82	7–13 (2–7)	OceanFirst Bank Center (3,495); West Long Branch, NJ
01/22/2017; 2:00 pm		Siena	L 68–81	7–14 (2–8)	Draddy Gymnasium (1,143); Riverdale, NY
01/26/2017; 7:00 pm		at Niagara	W 70–69	8–14 (3–8)	Gallagher Center (1,198); Lewiston, NY
01/28/2017; 2:00 pm, ESPN3		at Canisius	L 64–78	8–15 (3–9)	Koessler Athletic Center (1,602); Buffalo, NY
01/31/2017; 7:00 pm		at Fairfield	L 49–78	8–16 (3–10)	Webster Bank Arena (859); Bridgeport, CT
02/04/2017; 7:00 pm		Marist	W 68–67	9–16 (4–10)	Draddy Gymnasium (1,005); Riverdale, NY
02/10/2017; 9:00 pm, ESPNU		Monmouth	L 58–62	9–17 (4–11)	Draddy Gymnasium (987); Riverdale, NY
02/12/2017; 6:00 pm		Saint Peter's	L 50–69	9–18 (4–12)	Draddy Gymnasium (963); Riverdale, NY
02/16/2017; 7:00 pm, ESPN3		at Siena	L 71–94	9–19 (4–13)	Times Union Center (5,577); Albany, NY
02/19/2017; 6:00 pm		Quinnipiac	W 95–74	10–19 (5–13)	Draddy Gymnasium (963); Riverdale, NY
02/22/2017; 7:00 pm		at Rider	L 82–93	10–20 (5–14)	Alumni Gymnasium (1,650); Lawrenceville, NJ
02/24/2017; 7:00 pm, ESPNU		at Iona	L 51–72	10–21 (5–15)	Hynes Athletic Center; New Rochelle, NY
MAAC tournament
03/02/2017; 9:00 pm, ESPN3	(11)	vs. (6) Rider; First Round	L 68–69	10–22	Times Union Center (2,406); Albany, NY
*Non-conference game. ^{#}Rankings from AP Poll. (#) Tournament seedings in parentheses. All times are in Eastern Time Source.
