= 2016–17 Canisius Golden Griffins men's basketball team =

American college basketball season

2016–17 Canisius Golden Griffins men's basketball
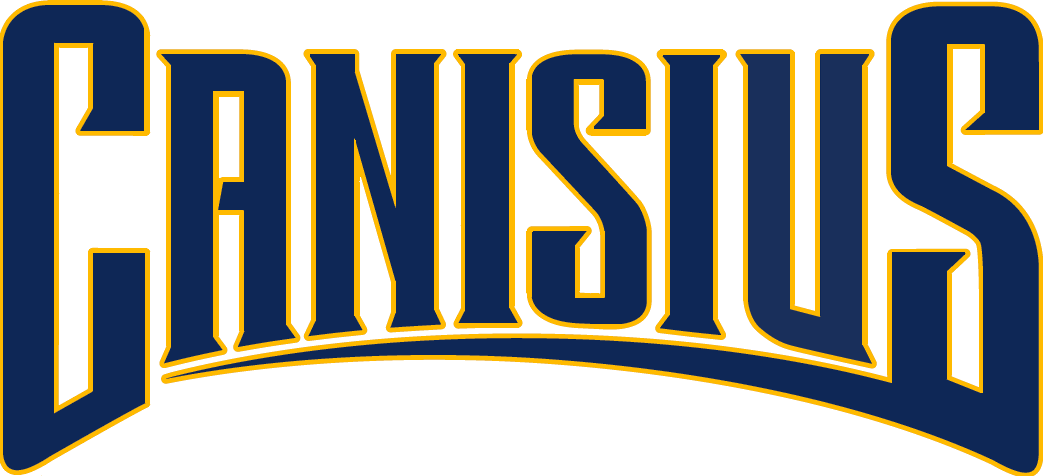

CIT, First Round
- Conference: Metro Atlantic Athletic Conference
- Record: 18–16 (10–10 MAAC)
- Head coach: Reggie Witherspoon (1st season)
- Assistant coaches: Chris Hawkins; Larry Blunt
- Home arena: Koessler Athletic Center

2016–17 MAAC men's basketball standings
	Conf.				Overall
Team	W		L	PCT	W		L	PCT
Monmouth	18	–	2	.900	27	–	7	.794
Saint Peter's	14	–	6	.700	23	–	13	.639
Iona †	12	–	8	.600	22	–	13	.629
Siena	12	–	8	.600	17	–	17	.500
Fairfield	11	–	9	.550	16	–	15	.516
Rider	10	–	10	.500	18	–	15	.545
Canisius	10	–	10	.500	18	–	16	.529
Quinnipiac	7	–	13	.350	10	–	21	.323
Niagara	6	–	14	.300	10	–	23	.303
Marist	5	–	15	.250	8	–	24	.250
Manhattan	5	–	15	.250	10	–	22	.313
† 2017 MAAC tournament winner

The 2016–17 Canisius Golden Griffins men's basketball team represented Canisius College during the 2016–17 NCAA Division I men's basketball season. The Golden Griffins, led by first-year head coach Reggie Witherspoon, played their home games at the Koessler Athletic Center in Buffalo, New York as members of the Metro Atlantic Athletic Conference. They finished the season 18–16, 10–10 in MAAC play to finish in a tie for sixth place. They defeated Marist in the first round of the MAAC tournament to advance to the Quarterfinals where they lost to Saint Peter's. They were invited to the CollegeInsider.com Tournament where they lost in the first round to Samford.

== Previous season ==
The Golden Griffins finished the 2015–16 season 14–19, 8–12 in MAAC play to finish in a tie for seventh place. They defeated Niagara in the first round of the MAAC tournament to advance to the Quarterfinals where they lost to Iona.

On May 20, 2016, head coach Jim Baron announced his retirement. He finished at Canisius with a four-year record of 73–59. On May 28, the school hired Reggie Witherspoon as head coach.

== Roster ==
2016–17 Canisius Golden Griffins men's basketball team
Players
Coaches

Pos.	#	Name	Height	Weight	Year	Hometown
F	00	Ronnie Gombe	6 ft 8 in (2.03 m)	230 lb (104 kg)	Jr	Nairobi, Kenya
G	1	Malik Johnson	5 ft 10 in (1.78 m)	155 lb (70 kg)	Fr	Richmond, Virginia
F	2	Jermaine Crumpton	6 ft 6 in (1.98 m)	245 lb (111 kg)	RS Jr	Niagara Falls, New York
G	3	Martin Dixon-Green	6 ft 3 in (1.91 m)	205 lb (93 kg)	Sr	Toronto, Ontario, Canada
G	4	Kiefer Douse	6 ft 3 in (1.91 m)	175 lb (79 kg)	Sr	Brampton, Ontario, Canada
G	5	Kassius Robertson	6 ft 3 in (1.91 m)	175 lb (79 kg)	RS Jr	Toronto, Ontario, Canada
C	10	Selvedin Planincic (I) (redshirt)	6 ft 11 in (2.11 m)	210 lb (95 kg)	Jr	Sherbrooke, Quebec, Canada
G	11	Chris Atkinson	5 ft 9 in (1.75 m)	155 lb (70 kg)	So	Hempstead, New York
G	13	Isaiah Reese	6 ft 5 in (1.96 m)	185 lb (84 kg)	Fr	Miami, Florida
G	14	Spencer Foley	6 ft 7 in (2.01 m)	190 lb (86 kg)	Fr	Chicago, Illinois
F	22	Phil Valenti	6 ft 7 in (2.01 m)	200 lb (91 kg)	RS Sr	Victor, New York
F	23	Dantai St. Louis	6 ft 8 in (2.03 m)	235 lb (107 kg)	Fr	Brampton, Ontario, Canada
F	25	Tyrell Taylor (W)	6 ft 5 in (1.96 m)	183 lb (83 kg)	So	Brooklyn, New York
F	32	Jibreel Faulkner	6 ft 8 in (2.03 m)	200 lb (91 kg)	So	Washington, D.C.

Head coach

- Reggie Witherspoon (Wheeling)

Assistant coach(es)

- Chris Hawkins (Radford)
- Larry Blunt (James Madison)

Legend

- (C) Team captain
- (S) Suspended
- (I) Ineligible
- (W) Walk-on
- Injured
- Current redshirt

Roster

== Schedule and results ==
Date time, TV	Rank^{#}	Opponent^{#}	Result	Record	Site (attendance) city, state
Exhibition
11/07/2016*; 6:00 pm		Ryerson	W 99–95		Koessler Athletic Center (811); Buffalo, NY
Regular season
11/13/2016*; 6:00 pm, ESPN2		at No. 2 Kentucky; Bluegrass Showcase	L 69–93	0–1	Rupp Arena (22,009); Lexington, KY
11/15/2016*; 7:00 pm, ESPN3		at Cleveland State; Bluegrass Showcase	L 64–67	0–2	Wolstein Center (1,149); Cleveland, OH
11/18/2016*; 7:00 pm		at Duquesne; Bluegrass Showcase	W 78–77	1–2	Palumbo Center (786); Pittsburgh, PA
11/21/2016*; 7:00 pm, ESPN3		UT Martin; Bluegrass Showcase	L 69–72	1–3	Koessler Athletic Center (1,291); Buffalo, NY
11/23/2016*; 7:00 pm		Tennessee State	L 58–72	1–4	Koessler Athletic Center (864); Buffalo, NY
11/26/2016*; 7:00 pm, ESPN3		at Youngstown State	W 90–84	2–4	Beeghly Center (1,174); Youngstown, OH
12/02/2016; 7:00 pm		at Manhattan	W 77–76	3–4 (1–0)	Draddy Gymnasium (1,275); Riverdale, NY
12/04/2016; 2:00 pm		at Monmouth	L 88–94	3–5 (1–1)	OceanFirst Bank Center (2,175); West Long Branch, NJ
12/07/2016*; 7:30 pm		at Boston University	W 87–77	4–5	Case Gym (363); Boston, MA
12/10/2016*; 2:00 pm, ESPN3		at St. Francis Brooklyn	W 91–81	5–5	Generoso Pope Athletic Complex (1,103); Brooklyn, NY
12/12/2016*; 7:00 pm, ESPN3		Albany	W 77–64	6–5	Koessler Athletic Center (944); Buffalo, NY
12/17/2016*; 3:30 pm, SPSN		vs. Buffalo; Big 4 Basketball Classic	W 94–87 ^{OT}	7–5	KeyBank Center (5,327); Buffalo, NY
12/22/2016*; 7:00 pm		at St. Bonaventure	W 106–101 ^{OT}	8–5	Reilly Center (3,433); Olean, NY
01/02/2017; 2:00 pm, SPSN		Siena	W 82–79	9–5 (2–1)	Koessler Athletic Center (1,418); Buffalo, NY
01/04/2017; 7:00 pm, ESPN3		Quinnipiac	W 83–77	10–5 (3–1)	Koessler Athletic Center (1,011); Buffalo, NY
01/08/2017; 4:00 pm, ESPN3		at Iona	L 75–98	10–6 (3–2)	Hynes Athletic Center (1,650); New Rochelle, NY
01/10/2017; 7:00 pm		at Fairfield	W 86–72	11–6 (4–2)	Webster Bank Arena (1,112); Bridgeport, CT
01/14/2017; 2:00 pm, ESPN3		Marist	W 91–58	12–6 (5–2)	Koessler Athletic Center (1,524); Buffalo, NY
01/16/2017; 7:00 pm, ESPN3		Monmouth	L 72–76	12–7 (5–3)	Koessler Athletic Center (1,684); Buffalo, NY
01/20/2017; 7:00 pm		at Quinnipiac	L 90–95	12–8 (5–4)	TD Bank Sports Center (1,585); Hamden, CT
01/23/2017; 7:00 pm		at Niagara; Battle of the Bridge	L 84–91	12–9 (5–5)	Gallagher Center (1,895); Lewiston, NY
01/28/2017; 2:00 pm, ESPN3		Manhattan	W 78–64	13–9 (6–5)	Koessler Athletic Center (1,602); Buffalo, NY
01/30/2017; 7:00 pm, ESPN3		Rider	L 66–72	13–10 (6–6)	Koessler Athletic Center (1,137); Buffalo, NY
02/04/2017; 7:00 pm		at Siena	W 80–73	14–10 (7–6)	Times Union Center (7,209); Albany, NY
02/06/2017; 7:00 pm		at Saint Peter's	W 72–70	15–10 (8–6)	Yanitelli Center (351); Jersey City, NY
02/10/2017; 8:00 pm, ESPN3		Niagara; Battle of the Bridge	L 81–94	15–11 (8–7)	Koessler Athletic Center (2,196); Buffalo, NY
02/14/2017; 7:00 pm, ESPN3		Iona	W 89–83	16–11 (9–7)	Koessler Athletic Center (986); Buffalo, NY
02/17/2017; 7:00 pm, ESPN3		at Rider	W 85–77	17–11 (10–7)	Alumni Gymnasium (1,632); Lawrenceville, NJ
02/19/2017; 2:00 pm		at Marist	L 74–76	17–12 (10–8)	McCann Field House (1,381); Poughkeepsie, NY
02/24/2017; 7:00 pm, ESPN3		Fairfield	L 55–58	17–13 (10–9)	Koessler Athletic Center (1,299); Buffalo, NY
02/26/2017; 2:00 pm, ESPN3		Saint Peter's	L 65–72	17–14 (10–10)	Koessler Athletic Center (1,354); Buffalo, NY
MAAC tournament
03/02/2017; 7:00 pm, ESPN3	(7)	vs. (10) Marist; First Round	W 77–73	18–14	Times Union Center (2,406); Albany, NY
03/03/2017; 9:30 pm, ESPN3	(7)	vs. (2) Saint Peter's; Quarterfinals	L 58–61	18–15	Times Union Center (2,298); Albany, NY
CIT
03/14/2017*; 7:30 pm, Facebook Live		at Samford; First Round	L 74–78	18–16	Pete Hanna Center (614); Homewood, AL
*Non-conference game. ^{#}Rankings from AP Poll. (#) Tournament seedings in parentheses. All times are in Eastern Time.
