= 2016–17 Monmouth Hawks men's basketball team =

American college basketball season

2016–17 Monmouth Hawks men's basketball
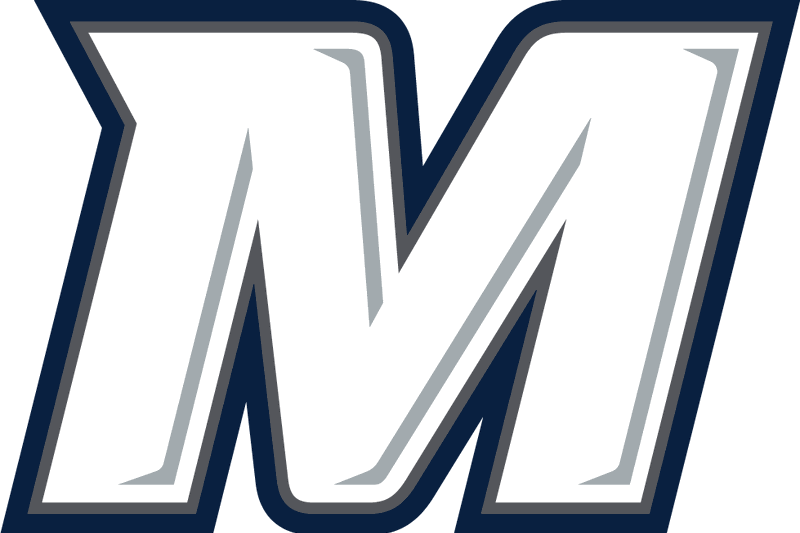

MAAC regular season champions

NIT, First Round
- Conference: Metro Atlantic Athletic Conference
- Record: 27–7 (18–2 MAAC)
- Head coach: King Rice (6th season)
- Assistant coaches: Rick Callahan; Sam Ferry; Duane Woodward
- Home arena: OceanFirst Bank Center

2016–17 MAAC men's basketball standings
	Conf.				Overall
Team	W		L	PCT	W		L	PCT
Monmouth	18	–	2	.900	27	–	7	.794
Saint Peter's	14	–	6	.700	23	–	13	.639
Iona †	12	–	8	.600	22	–	13	.629
Siena	12	–	8	.600	17	–	17	.500
Fairfield	11	–	9	.550	16	–	15	.516
Rider	10	–	10	.500	18	–	15	.545
Canisius	10	–	10	.500	18	–	16	.529
Quinnipiac	7	–	13	.350	10	–	21	.323
Niagara	6	–	14	.300	10	–	23	.303
Marist	5	–	15	.250	8	–	24	.250
Manhattan	5	–	15	.250	10	–	22	.313
† 2017 MAAC tournament winner

The 2016–17 Monmouth Hawks men's basketball team represented Monmouth University during the 2016–17 NCAA Division I men's basketball season. The Hawks, led by sixth year head coach King Rice, played their home games at OceanFirst Bank Center as members of the Metro Atlantic Athletic Conference (MAAC). They finished the season 27–7, 18–2 in MAAC play to win the regular season championship, their second consecutive conference title. As the No. 1 seed in the MAAC tournament, they defeated Niagara before losing to Siena in the semifinals. As a regular season conference champions who did not win their conference tournament, Monmouth received an automatic bid the National Invitation Tournament. As a No. 4 seed, they lost to Ole Miss in the first round.

== Previous season ==
The Hawks finished the 2016–17 season 28–8, 17–3 in MAAC play to win the MAAC regular season championship. They defeated Rider and Fairfield to advance to the championship game of the MAAC tournament where they lost to Iona. As a regular season conference champion who failed to win their conference tournament, they received an automatic bid to the National Invitation Tournament. As one of the last four teams left out of the NCAA tournament, they received a No. 1 seed in the NIT where they defeated Bucknell in the first round before losing to George Washington in the second round.

== Roster ==
2016–17 Monmouth Hawks men's basketball team
Players
Coaches

Pos.	#	Name	Height	Weight	Year	Hometown
G	0	Josh James (C)	6 ft 2 in (1.88 m)	200 lb (91 kg)	Sr	Greenburgh, NY
F	1	Pierre Sarr	6 ft 8 in (2.03 m)	195 lb (88 kg)	So	Dakar, Senegal
F	4	Greg Noack	6 ft 8 in (2.03 m)	195 lb (88 kg)	Sr	Bethlehem, PA
G	5	Ray Salnave	6 ft 3 in (1.91 m)	195 lb (88 kg)	Fr	Elmont, NY
G	10	Micah Seaborn	6 ft 5 in (1.96 m)	190 lb (86 kg)	RS So	Fort Worth, TX
G	11	Je'lon Hornbeak (C)	6 ft 3 in (1.91 m)	190 lb (86 kg)	RS Sr	Arlington, TX
G	12	Justin Robinson (C)	5 ft 8 in (1.73 m)	175 lb (79 kg)	Sr	Lake Katrine, NY
F	14	Mustapha Traore	6 ft 8 in (2.03 m)	210 lb (95 kg)	Jr	Philadelphia, PA
G	15	Daniel Pillari	5 ft 10 in (1.78 m)	170 lb (77 kg)	So	Oceanport, NJ
G	23	Austin Tilghman	6 ft 1 in (1.85 m)	230 lb (104 kg)	Jr	Wilmington, DE
G	24	Louie Pillari	6 ft 6 in (1.98 m)	200 lb (91 kg)	So	Tinton Falls, NJ
G	30	Collin Stewart	6 ft 8 in (2.03 m)	200 lb (91 kg)	RS Sr	Glenville, NY
F	32	Diago Quinn	6 ft 9 in (2.06 m)	255 lb (116 kg)	So	New York, NY
C	33	Zac Tillman	6 ft 10 in (2.08 m)	285 lb (129 kg)	Sr	Yeadon, PA
C	43	Chris Brady	6 ft 10 in (2.08 m)	250 lb (113 kg)	Sr	Greenlawn, NY
F	44	Sam Ibiezugbe	6 ft 11 in (2.11 m)	250 lb (113 kg)	Fr	Simsbury, CT

Head coach

- King Rice (North Carolina)

Assistant coach(es)

- Rick Callahan (Salem International)
- Sam Ferry (Vanderbilt)
- Duane Woodward (Boston College)

Legend

- (C) Team captain
- (S) Suspended
- (I) Ineligible
- (W) Walk-on
- Injured
- Current redshirt

Roster

== Schedule and results ==
Date time, TV	Rank^{#}	Opponent^{#}	Result	Record	Site (attendance) city, state
Regular season
11/11/2016*; 7:00 pm		Drexel	W 78–65	1–0	OceanFirst Bank Center (3,738); West Long Branch, NJ
11/15/2016*; 6:30 pm		at South Carolina; Brooklyn Hoops Holiday Invitational	L 69–70 ^{OT}	1–1	Colonial Life Arena (9,779); Columbia, SC
11/18/2016*; 7:00 pm, ACCN Extra		at No. 18 Syracuse; Brooklyn Hoops Holiday Invitational	L 50–71	1–2	Carrier Dome (22,636); Syracuse, NY
11/22/2016*; 7:00 pm		Cornell	W 76–61	2–2	OceanFirst Bank Center (2,215); West Long Branch, NJ
11/26/2016*; 1:05 pm		vs. South Carolina State; Brooklyn Hoops Holiday Invitational	W 86–62	3–2	Hart Center (530); Worcester, MA
11/27/2016*; 12:05 pm		at Holy Cross; Brooklyn Hoops Holiday Invitational	W 80–77	4–2	Hart Center (1,565); Worcester, MA
12/01/2016; 7:00 pm		at Quinnipiac	W 91–72	5–2 (1–0)	TD Bank Sports Center (1,654); Hamden, CT
12/04/2016; 2:00 pm		Canisius	W 94–88	6–2 (2–0)	OceanFirst Bank Center (2,175); West Long Branch, NJ
12/06/2016*; 7:00 pm		at Wagner	W 81–71	7–2	Spiro Sports Center (1,302); Staten Island, NY
12/10/2016*; 7:00 pm		Army	W 81–71	8–2	OceanFirst Bank Center (3,465); West Long Branch, NJ
12/13/2016*; 9:00 pm, ESPN3		at Memphis	W 82–79	9–2	FedEx Forum (7,831); Memphis, TN
12/20/2016*; 7:00 pm, ESPN3		Princeton	W 96–90	10–2	OceanFirst Bank Center (3,530); West Long Branch, NJ
12/29/2016*; 7:00 pm, ESPNU		at No. 9 North Carolina	L 74–102	10–3	Dean Smith Center (20,064); Chapel Hill, NC
12/31/2016; 1:00 pm, ESPN3		Rider	L 90–93 ^{OT}	10–4 (2–1)	OceanFirst Bank Center (3,128); West Long Branch, NJ
01/02/2017; 7:00 pm		at Saint Peter's	L 61–71	10–5 (2–2)	Yanitelli Center (525); Jersey City, NJ
01/06/2017; 7:00 pm, ESPNU		Iona	W 92–74	11–5 (3–2)	OceanFirst Bank Center (3,105); West Long Branch, NJ
01/08/2017; 2:00 pm, ESPN3		Marist	W 71–64	12–5 (4–2)	OceanFirst Bank Center (2,428); West Long Branch, NJ
01/14/2017; 7:00 pm		at Niagara	W 90–83	13–5 (5–2)	Gallagher Center (893); Lewiston, NY
01/16/2017; 7:00 pm, ESPN3		at Canisius	W 76–72	14–5 (6–2)	Koessler Athletic Center (1,684); Buffalo, NY
01/20/2017; 7:00 pm, ESPN3		Manhattan	W 82–71	15–5 (7–2)	OceanFirst Bank Center (3,495); West Long Branch, NJ
01/22/2017; 7:00 pm, ESPN3		Fairfield	W 91–49	16–5 (8–2)	OceanFirst Bank Center (2,793); West Long Branch, NJ
01/27/2017; 7:00 pm, ESPNU		Quinnipiac	W 95–76	17–5 (9–2)	OceanFirst Bank Center (2,982); West Long Branch, NJ
01/30/2017; 7:00 pm		at Marist	W 83–71	18–5 (10–2)	McCann Field House (1,308); Poughkeepsie, NY
02/03/2017; 7:00 pm, ESPN3		Saint Peter's	W 71–70 ^{OT}	19–5 (11–2)	OceanFirst Bank Center (3,878); West Long Branch, NJ
02/06/2017; 7:00 pm		at Rider	W 74–69	20–5 (12–2)	Alumni Gymnasium (1,650); Lawrenceville, NJ
02/10/2017; 9:00 pm, ESPNU		at Manhattan	W 62–58	21–5 (13–2)	Draddy Gymnasium (987); Riverdale, NY
02/13/2017; 7:00 pm, ESPN2		at Siena	W 102–82	22–5 (14–2)	Times Union Center (5,716); Albany, NY
02/16/2017; 8:00 pm, ESPN3		Niagara	W 93–75	23–5 (15–2)	OceanFirst Bank Center (2,934); West Long Branch, NJ
02/21/2017; 7:00 pm, ESPN3		at Fairfield	W 82–62	24–5 (16–2)	Webster Bank Arena (1,816); Bridgeport, CT
02/24/2017; 7:00 pm, ESPN2		Siena	W 77–73	25–5 (17–2)	OceanFirst Bank Center (4,172); West Long Branch, NJ
02/26/2017; 4:00 pm, ESPN3		at Iona	W 79–73	26–5 (18–2)	Hynes Athletic Center (2,611); New Rochelle, NY
MAAC tournament
03/03/2017; 7:00 pm, ESPN3	(1)	vs. (9) Niagara; Quarterfinals	W 84–59	27–5	Times Union Center (2,298); Albany, NY
03/05/2017; 4:30 pm, ESPN3	(1)	vs. (4) Siena; Semifinals	L 85–89	27–6	Times Union Center; Albany, NY
NIT
03/14/2017*; 7:00 pm, ESPN2	(4)	(5) Ole Miss; First Round – Syracuse Bracket	L 83–91	27–7	OceanFirst Bank Center (1,672); West Long Branch, NJ
*Non-conference game. ^{#}Rankings from AP Poll. (#) Tournament seedings in parentheses. All times are in Eastern Time Source.

== Rankings ==
Ranking movements Legend: RV = Received votes
	Week																			
Poll	Pre	1	2	3	4	5	6	7	8	9	10	11	12	13	14	15	16	17	18	Final
AP	RV	RV													RV	RV	RV	RV		Not released
Coaches																			RV	
