= 2016–17 Niagara Purple Eagles men's basketball team =

American college basketball season

2016–17 Niagara Purple Eagles men's basketball
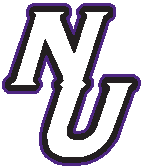
- Conference: Metro Atlantic Athletic Conference
- Record: 10–23 (6–14 MAAC)
- Head coach: Chris Casey (4th season)
- Assistant coaches: Marc Rybczyk; Will Lanier; Kareem Brown
- Home arena: Gallagher Center

2016–17 MAAC men's basketball standings
| | Conf. | | | | Overall |
| Team | W | | L | PCT | W | | L | PCT |
|---|---|---|---|---|---|---|---|---|
| Monmouth | 18 | – | 2 | .900 | 27 | – | 7 | .794 |
| Saint Peter's | 14 | – | 6 | .700 | 23 | – | 13 | .639 |
| Iona † | 12 | – | 8 | .600 | 22 | – | 13 | .629 |
| Siena | 12 | – | 8 | .600 | 17 | – | 17 | .500 |
| Fairfield | 11 | – | 9 | .550 | 16 | – | 15 | .516 |
| Rider | 10 | – | 10 | .500 | 18 | – | 15 | .545 |
| Canisius | 10 | – | 10 | .500 | 18 | – | 16 | .529 |
| Quinnipiac | 7 | – | 13 | .350 | 10 | – | 21 | .323 |
| Niagara | 6 | – | 14 | .300 | 10 | – | 23 | .303 |
| Marist | 5 | – | 15 | .250 | 8 | – | 24 | .250 |
| Manhattan | 5 | – | 15 | .250 | 10 | – | 22 | .313 |
† 2017 MAAC tournament winner

The 2016–17 Niagara Purple Eagles men's basketball team represented Niagara University during the 2016–17 NCAA Division I men's basketball season. The Purple Eagles, led by fourth year head coach Chris Casey, played their home games at the Gallagher Center in Lewiston, New York as members of the Metro Atlantic Athletic Conference. They finished the season 10–23, 6–14 in MAAC play to finish in ninth place. They defeated Quinnipiac in the first round of the MAAC tournament to advance to the quarterfinals where they lost to Monmouth.

== Previous season ==
The Purple Eagles finished the 2015–16 season 7–25, 5–15 in MAAC play to finish in tenth place. They lost in the first round of the MAAC tournament to Canisius.

== Roster ==
2016–17 Niagara Purple Eagles men's basketball team
Players
Coaches

| Pos. | # | Name | Height | Weight | Year | Hometown |
|---|---|---|---|---|---|---|
| G | 0 | Chris Barton | 6 ft 3 in (1.91 m) | 185 lb (84 kg) | So | Pontiac, Michigan |
| G | 1 | Shane Gatling | 6 ft 1 in (1.85 m) | 166 lb (75 kg) | Fr | Baldwin, New York |
| G | 2 | Kevin Larkin | 6 ft 5 in (1.96 m) | 180 lb (82 kg) | RS So | Georgetown, Delaware |
| G | 5 | James Towns | 5 ft 10 in (1.78 m) | 162 lb (73 kg) | Fr | Detroit, Michigan |
| G | 10 | Kahlil Dukes | 6 ft 0 in (1.83 m) | 170 lb (77 kg) | RS Jr | Hartford, Connecticut |
| F | 11 | Marvin Prochet | 6 ft 7 in (2.01 m) | 206 lb (93 kg) | So | Brooklyn, New York |
| G | 12 | Dwayne Pow | 5 ft 10 in (1.78 m) | 165 lb (75 kg) | RS So | Bronk, New York |
| G | 13 | Matt Scott | 6 ft 4 in (1.93 m) | 185 lb (84 kg) | Jr | Brooklyn, New York |
| F | 20 | Maurice Taylor Jr. | 6 ft 6 in (1.98 m) | 212 lb (96 kg) | Sr | Cambridge, Massachusetts |
| F | 21 | Kierell Green | 6 ft 7 in (2.01 m) | 165 lb (75 kg) | Fr | Washington, D.C. |
| F | 24 | Greg King | 6 ft 7 in (2.01 m) | 230 lb (104 kg) | RS Jr | Atlanta, Georgia |
| F | 30 | Ali Tew | 6 ft 9 in (2.06 m) | 221 lb (100 kg) | RS Jr | Paris, France |
| F | 32 | Dominic Robb | 6 ft 8 in (2.03 m) | 222 lb (101 kg) | So | Pittsburgh, Pennsylvania |

Head coach

- Chris Casey (Western Connecticut State)

Assistant coach(es)

- Marc Rybczyk (Central Connecticut State)
- Will Lanier (Georgia Tech)
- Kareem Brown (St. John's)

Legend

- (C) Team captain
- (S) Suspended
- (I) Ineligible
- (W) Walk-on
- Injured
- Current redshirt

Roster

== Schedule and results ==
| Date time, TV | Rank^{#} | Opponent^{#} | Result | Record | Site (attendance) city, state |
Regular season
| 11/11/2016*; 8:00 pm, LCTV | | Buffalo | L 66–76 | 0–1 | Gallagher Center (2,016); Lewiston, NY |
| 11/13/2016*; 3:00 pm | | at Brown | L 79–88 | 0–2 | Pizzitola Sports Center (757); Providence, RI |
| 11/15/2016*; 6:30 am, ESPN2 | | at Hartford; Scarlet Knight Showcase/ College Hoops Tip-Off Marathon | L 78–82 ^{OT} | 0–3 | Chase Arena at Reich Family Pavilion (2,607); Hartford, CT |
| 11/20/2016*; 12:00 pm, BTN | | at Rutgers; Scarlet Knight Showcase | L 65–78 | 0–4 | Louis Brown Athletic Center (3,572); Piscataway, NJ |
| 11/23/2016*; 7:00 pm, LCTV | | Drexel; Scarlet Knight Showcase | W 93–74 | 1–4 | Gallagher Center (863); Lewiston, NY |
| 11/26/2016*; 8:00 pm | | at North Texas; Scarlet Knight Showcase | L 71–80 | 1–5 | The Super Pit (1,411); Denton, TX |
| 12/02/2016; 7:00 pm | | at Marist | L 66–72 | 1–6 (0–1) | McCann Field House (1,355); Poughkeepsie, NY |
| 12/04/2016; 4:00 pm | | at Iona | W 74–58 | 2–6 (1–1) | Hynes Athletic Center (1,667); New Rochelle, NY |
| 12/07/2016*; 7:00 pm | | at Kent State | L 72–100 | 2–7 | MAC Center (2,115); Kent, OH |
| 12/10/2016*; 3:00 pm, SPEC | | Norfolk State | W 65–61 | 3–7 | Gallagher Center (1,242); Lewiston, NY |
| 12/14/2016*; 7:00 pm, ESPN3 | | at Youngstown State | L 97–101 ^{OT} | 3–8 | Beeghly Center (1,294); Youngstown, OH |
| 12/17/2016*; 1:00 pm | | at St. Bonaventure; Big 4 Classic | L 69–79 | 3–9 | KeyBank Center; Buffalo, NY |
| 12/21/2016*; 7:30 pm | | at LIU Brooklyn | W 75–66 | 4–9 | Barclays Center (1,219); Brooklyn, NY |
| 01/02/2017; 7:00 pm, LCTV | | Quinnipiac | L 78–81 | 4–10 (1–2) | Gallagher Center (849); Lewiston, NY |
| 01/04/2017; 7:00 pm, SPEC | | Siena | W 71–66 | 5–10 (2–2) | Gallagher Center (872); Lewiston, NY |
| 01/08/2017; 7:00 pm | | at Rider | L 78–89 | 5–11 (2–3) | Alumni Gymnasium (1,192); Lawrenceville, NJ |
| 01/10/2017; 7:00 pm | | at Manhattan | L 69–78 | 5–12 (2–4) | Draddy Gymnasium (525); Riverdale, NY |
| 01/14/2017; 7:00 pm, SPEC | | Monmouth | L 83–90 | 5–13 (2–5) | Gallagher Center (893); Lewiston, NY |
| 01/16/2017; 7:00 pm, LCTV | | Marist | L 87–93 ^{OT} | 5–14 (2–6) | Gallagher Center (1,017); Lewiston, NY |
| 01/21/2017; 2:00 pm | | at Saint Peter's | W 57–55 | 6–14 (3–6) | Yanitelli Center (347); Jersey City, NJ |
| 01/23/2017; 2:00 pm, SPEC | | Canisius; Battle of the Bridge | W 91–84 | 7–14 (4–6) | Gallagher Center (1,895); Lewiston, NY |
| 01/26/2017; 7:00 pm, LCTV | | Manhattan | L 69–70 | 7–15 (4–7) | Gallagher Center (1,198); Lewiston, NY |
| 01/28/2017; 3:00 pm, LCTV | | Rider | W 80–67 | 8–15 (5–7) | Gallagher Center (1,295); Lewiston, NY |
| 02/02/2017; 8:00 pm, ESPN3 | | at Fairfield | L 61–81 | 8–16 (5–8) | Webster Bank Arena (1,051); Bridgeport, CT |
| 02/04/2017; 7:00 pm | | at Quinnipiac | L 81–89 | 8–17 (5–9) | TD Bank Sports Center (2,198); Hamden, CT |
| 02/10/2017; 8:00 pm, ESPN3 | | at Canisius; Battle of the Bridge | W 94–81 | 9–17 (6–9) | Koessler Athletic Center (2,196); Buffalo, NY |
| 02/12/2017; 2:00 pm, SPEC | | Iona | L 76–90 | 9–18 (6–10) | Gallagher Center (1,174); Lewiston, NY |
| 02/16/2017; 8:00 pm, ESPN3 | | at Monmouth | W 93–75 | 9–19 (6–11) | OceanFirst Bank Center (2,934); West Long Branch, NJ |
| 02/18/2017; 8:00 pm, ESPN3 | | at Siena | L 70–76 | 9–20 (6–12) | Times Union Center (6,850); Albany, NY |
| 02/24/2017; 7:00 pm, LCTV | | Saint Peter's | L 53–66 | 9–21 (6–13) | Gallagher Center (1,070); Lewiston, NY |
| 02/26/2017; 2:00 pm, SPEC | | Fairfield | L 58–62 | 9–22 (6–14) | Gallagher Center (1,078); Lewiston, NY |
MAAC tournament
| 03/02/2017; 5:00 pm, ESPN3 | (9) | vs. (8) Quinnipiac; First Round | W 88–69 | 10–22 | Times Union Center (2,406); Albany, NY |
| 03/03/2017; 7:00 pm, ESPN3 | (9) | vs. (1) Monmouth; Quarterfinals | L 59–84 | 10–23 | Times Union Center (2,298); Albany, NY |
*Non-conference game. ^{#}Rankings from AP Poll. (#) Tournament seedings in parentheses. All times are in Eastern Time Source.
