= 2016–17 Rider Broncs men's basketball team =

American college basketball season

2016–17 Rider Broncs men's basketball
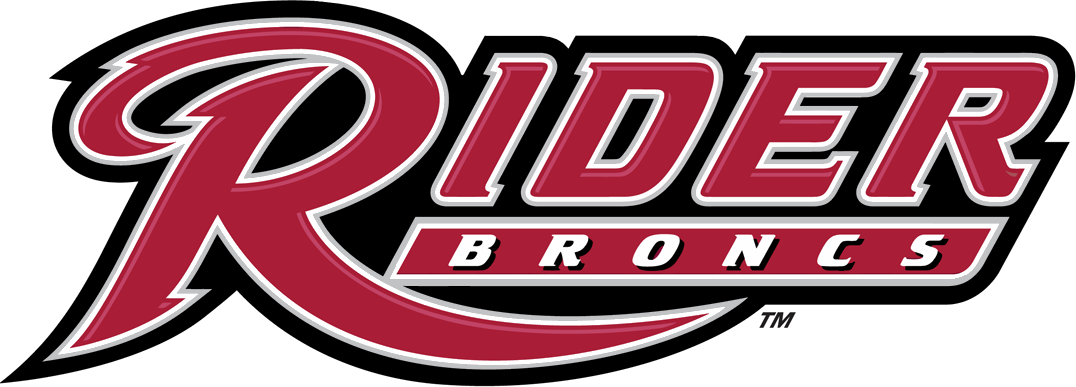
- Conference: Metro Atlantic Athletic Conference
- Record: 18–15 (10–10 MAAC)
- Head coach: Kevin Baggett (5th season)
- Assistant coaches: Ben Luber; Dino Presley; Marlon Guild
- Home arena: Alumni Gymnasium

2016–17 MAAC men's basketball standings
	Conf.				Overall
Team	W		L	PCT	W		L	PCT
Monmouth	18	–	2	.900	27	–	7	.794
Saint Peter's	14	–	6	.700	23	–	13	.639
Iona †	12	–	8	.600	22	–	13	.629
Siena	12	–	8	.600	17	–	17	.500
Fairfield	11	–	9	.550	16	–	15	.516
Rider	10	–	10	.500	18	–	15	.545
Canisius	10	–	10	.500	18	–	16	.529
Quinnipiac	7	–	13	.350	10	–	21	.323
Niagara	6	–	14	.300	10	–	23	.303
Marist	5	–	15	.250	8	–	24	.250
Manhattan	5	–	15	.250	10	–	22	.313
† 2017 MAAC tournament winner

The 2016–17 Rider Broncs men's basketball team represented Rider University during the 2016–17 NCAA Division I men's basketball season. The Broncs, led by fifth year head coach Kevin Baggett, played their home games at Alumni Gymnasium as members of the Metro Atlantic Athletic Conference. They finished the season 18–15, 10–10 in MAAC play to finish in a tie for sixth place. They defeated Manhattan in the first round of the MAAC tournament before losing in the quarterfinals to Iona.

== Previous season ==
The Broncs finished the 2015–16 season 13–20, 8–12 in MAAC play to finish in a tie for seventh place. They defeated Quinnipiac in the first round of the MAAC tournament to advance to the quarterfinals where they lost to Monmouth.

== Roster ==
2016–17 Rider Broncs men's basketball team
Players
Coaches

Pos.	#	Name	Height	Weight	Year	Hometown
F	0	Kahlil Thomas	6 ft 7 in (2.01 m)	230 lb (104 kg)	Sr	Pompano Beach, Florida
G	2	Jordan Allen	6 ft 3 in (1.91 m)	190 lb (86 kg)	Fr	Dover, Delaware
G	3	Jimmie Taylor	6 ft 4 in (1.93 m)	200 lb (91 kg)	Sr	Branford, Florida
G	5	Xzavier Malone	6 ft 4 in (1.93 m)	172 lb (78 kg)	Fr	Philadelphia, Pennsylvania
G	10	Kealen Washington-Ives	5 ft 9 in (1.75 m)	165 lb (75 kg)	So	Providence, Rhode Island
F	11	Xavier Lundy	6 ft 7 in (2.01 m)	230 lb (104 kg)	Sr	Paulsboro, New Jersey
G	12	Anthony Durham	6 ft 3 in (1.91 m)	190 lb (86 kg)	Jr	Philadelphia, Pennsylvania
F	13	Frederick Scott (I) (redshirt)	6 ft 7 in (2.01 m)	225 lb (102 kg)	So	Munster, Indiana
G/F	14	Dimencio Vaughn	6 ft 5 in (1.96 m)	210 lb (95 kg)	Fr	New York, New York
C	20	Tyere Marshall	6 ft 8 in (2.03 m)	220 lb (100 kg)	Fr	Philadelphia, Pennsylvania
F	21	Norville Carey	6 ft 7 in (2.01 m)	228 lb (103 kg)	Sr	British Virgin Islands
F	22	Devine Eke (I) (redshirt)	6 ft 7 in (2.01 m)	195 lb (88 kg)	So	Plainfield, New Jersey
G	23	Stevie Jordan	5 ft 10 in (1.78 m)	170 lb (77 kg)	Fr	Bensalem Township, Pennsylvania

Head coach

- Kevin Baggett (Saint Joseph's)

Assistant coach(es)

- Dino Presley (Kutztown University)
- Ben Luber (Penn State)
- Marlon Guild (Hartford)

Legend

- (C) Team captain
- (S) Suspended
- (I) Ineligible
- (W) Walk-on
- Injured
- Current redshirt

Roster

== Schedule and results ==
Date time, TV	Rank^{#}	Opponent^{#}	Result	Record	Site (attendance) city, state
Exhibition
11/05/2016*; 4:00 pm		Bloomsburg (PA)	W 83–68		Alumni Gymnasium (1,650); Lawrenceville, NJ
Regular season
11/11/2016*; 7:00 pm		at Hampton	W 67–56	1–0	Hampton Convocation Center (2,152); Hampton, VA
11/16/2016*; 7:00 pm		at Hartford	W 84–68	2–0	Chase Arena at Reich Family Pavilion (866); Hartford, CT
11/19/2016*; 7:00 pm, ESPN3		at South Florida	L 65–70	2–1	USF Sun Dome (2,639); Tampa, FL
11/23/2016*; 2:00 pm		at Fordham	L 62–73	2–2	Rose Hill Gymnasium (1,023); Bronx, NY
11/26/2016*; 4:00 pm		at Wagner	W 70–67	3–2	Spiro Sports Center (1,001); Staten Island, NY
12/01/2016; 7:00 pm		Fairfield	L 67–76	3–3 (0–1)	Alumni Gymnasium (1,622); Lawrenceville, NJ
12/05/2016; 7:00 pm		Siena	W 71–69	4–3 (1–1)	Alumni Gymnasium (1,511); Lawrenceville, NJ
12/10/2016*; 10:30 pm		at Pacific; Gotham Classic	W 73–66	5–3	Stockton Arena (1,969); Stockton, CA
12/14/2016*; 7:00 pm		Kennesaw State; Gotham Classic	W 81–79	6–3	Alumni Gymnasium (1,612); Lawrenceville, NJ
12/16/2016*; 7:00 pm		Drexel	W 90–82	7–3	Alumni Gymnasium (1,531); Lawrenceville, NJ
12/18/2016*; 1:00 pm		at North Carolina A&T; Gotham Classic	W 60–59	8–3	Corbett Sports Center (342); Greensboro, NC
12/22/2016*; 7:00 pm		at Massachusetts; Gotham Classic	L 67–78	8–4	Mullins Center (2,547); Amherst, MA
12/28/2016*; 7:00 pm		at NC State	L 71–99	8–5	PNC Arena (16,111); Raleigh, NC
12/31/2016; 1:00 pm		at Monmouth	W 93–90 ^{OT}	9–5 (2–1)	OceanFirst Bank Center (3,128); West Long Branch, NJ
01/06/2017; 7:00 pm, ESPN3		at Marist	W 73–62	10–5 (3–1)	McCann Field House (1,001); Poughkeepsie, NY
01/08/2017; 7:00 pm		Niagara	W 89–78	11–5 (4–1)	Alumni Gymnasium (1,192); Lawrenceville, NJ
01/13/2017; 9:00 pm, ESPNU		at Manhattan	L 73–76	11–6 (4–2)	Draddy Gymnasium (675); Riverdale, NY
01/15/2017; 2:00 pm		Saint Peter's	L 65–71	11–7 (4–3)	Alumni Gymnasium (1,265); Lawrenceville, NJ
01/17/2017; 7:00 pm, ESPN3		at Siena	L 68–78	11–8 (4–4)	Times Union Center (4,788); Albany, NY
01/21/2017; 7:00 pm		Marist	W 84–66	12–8 (5–4)	Alumni Gymnasium (1,650); Lawrenceville, NJ
01/23/2017; 7:00 pm		at Saint Peter's	L 51–56	12–9 (5–5)	Yanitelli Center; Jersey City, NJ
01/28/2017; 3:00 pm		at Niagara	L 67–80	12–10 (5–6)	Gallagher Center (1,295); Lewiston, NY
01/30/2017; 2:00 pm, ESPN3		at Canisius	W 72–66	13–10 (6–6)	Koessler Athletic Center (1,137); Buffalo, NY
02/03/2017; 7:00 pm, ESPNU		Iona	L 76–95	13–11 (6–7)	Alumni Gymnasium (1,650); Lawrenceville, NJ
02/06/2016; 7:00 pm		Monmouth	L 69–74	13–12 (6–8)	Alumni Gymnasium (1,650); Lawrenceville, NJ
02/11/2017; 2:00 pm		Quinnipiac	W 112–107	14–12 (7–8)	Alumni Gymnasium (1,623); Lawrenceville, NJ
02/13/2017; 7:00 pm, ESPN3		at Fairfield	L 67–69	14–13 (7–9)	Alumni Hall (1,592); Fairfield, CT
02/17/2017; 7:00 pm, ESPN3		Canisius	L 77–85	14–14 (7–10)	Alumni Gymnasium (1,632); Lawrenceville, NJ
02/19/2017; 5:00 pm, ESPN3		at Iona	W 103–85	15–14 (8–10)	Hynes Athletic Center (1,925); New Rochelle, NY
02/22/2017; 7:00 pm		Manhattan	W 93–82	16–14 (9–10)	Alumni Gymnasium (1,650); Lawrenceville, NJ
02/26/2017; 2:00 pm		at Quinnipiac	W 99–82	17–14 (10–10)	TD Bank Sports Center (2,124); Hamden, CT
MAAC tournament
03/02/2017; 9:00 pm, ESPN3	(6)	vs. (11) Manhattan; First Round	W 69–68	18–14	Times Union Center (2,406); Albany, NY
03/04/2017; 7:00 pm, ESPN3	(6)	vs. (3) Iona; Quarterfinals	L 70–88	18–15	Times Union Center (4,735); Albany, NY
*Non-conference game. ^{#}Rankings from AP Poll. (#) Tournament seedings in parentheses. All times are in Eastern Time Source.
