= 2016–17 Quinnipiac Bobcats men's basketball team =

American college basketball season

2016–17 Quinnipiac Bobcats men's basketball
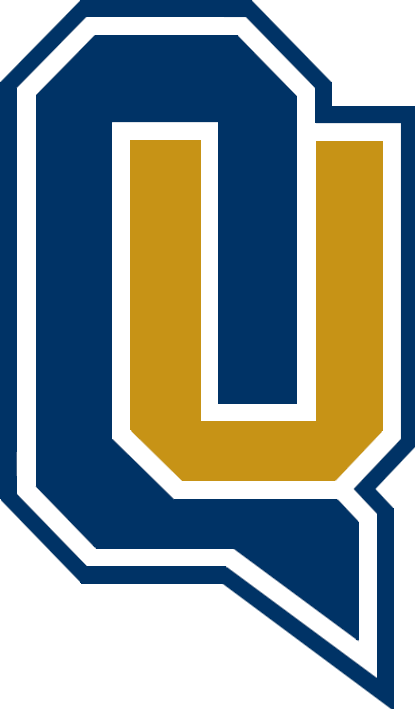
- Conference: Metro Atlantic Athletic Conference
- Record: 10–21 (7–13 MAAC)
- Head coach: Tom Moore (10th season)
- Assistant coaches: Sean Doherty; Eric Eaton; Tony Newsom
- Home arena: TD Bank Sports Center

2016–17 MAAC men's basketball standings
| | Conf. | | | | Overall |
| Team | W | | L | PCT | W | | L | PCT |
|---|---|---|---|---|---|---|---|---|
| Monmouth | 18 | – | 2 | .900 | 27 | – | 7 | .794 |
| Saint Peter's | 14 | – | 6 | .700 | 23 | – | 13 | .639 |
| Iona † | 12 | – | 8 | .600 | 22 | – | 13 | .629 |
| Siena | 12 | – | 8 | .600 | 17 | – | 17 | .500 |
| Fairfield | 11 | – | 9 | .550 | 16 | – | 15 | .516 |
| Rider | 10 | – | 10 | .500 | 18 | – | 15 | .545 |
| Canisius | 10 | – | 10 | .500 | 18 | – | 16 | .529 |
| Quinnipiac | 7 | – | 13 | .350 | 10 | – | 21 | .323 |
| Niagara | 6 | – | 14 | .300 | 10 | – | 23 | .303 |
| Marist | 5 | – | 15 | .250 | 8 | – | 24 | .250 |
| Manhattan | 5 | – | 15 | .250 | 10 | – | 22 | .313 |
† 2017 MAAC tournament winner

The 2016–17 Quinnipiac Bobcats men's basketball team represented Quinnipiac University during the 2016–17 NCAA Division I men's basketball season. The Bobcats, led by 10th year head coach Tom Moore, played their home games at the TD Bank Sports Center in Hamden, Connecticut as members of the Metro Atlantic Athletic Conference. They finished the season 10–21, 7–13 in MAAC play to finish in eighth place. They lost in the first round of the MAAC tournament to Niagara.

On March 7, 2017, head coach Tom Moore was fired. He finished at Quinnipiac with a ten year record of 162–146. On March 27, Villanova assistant coach Baker Dunleavy was hired as the Bobcats next head coach.

== Previous season ==
The Bobcats finished the 2015–16 season 9–21, 6–14 in MAAC play to finish in ninth place. They lost in the first round of the MAAC tournament to Rider.

== Roster ==
2016–17 Quinnipiac Bobcats men's basketball team
Players
Coaches

| Pos. | # | Name | Height | Weight | Year | Previous school | Hometown |
|---|---|---|---|---|---|---|---|
| G | 0 | Aaron Robinson | 6 ft 6 in (1.98 m) | 215 lb (98 kg) | So | Springbook | Takoma Park, Maryland |
| F | 1 | Donovan Smith | 6 ft 9 in (2.06 m) | 245 lb (111 kg) | Sr | Richards; Triton CC | Chicago, Illinois |
| G | 2 | Reggie Oliver | 6 ft 1 in (1.85 m) | 185 lb (84 kg) | Jr | Lakeridge (Ore.); Howard College | Apopka, Florida |
| G | 3 | Mikey Dixon | 6 ft 2 in (1.88 m) | 160 lb (73 kg) | Fr | Sanford | New Castle, Delaware |
| G | 4 | Phil Winston | 6 ft 2 in (1.88 m) | 185 lb (84 kg) | Jr | Clover Park; Utah State Eastern | Lakewood, Washington |
| G | 10 | Cameron Young | 6 ft 6 in (1.98 m) | 190 lb (86 kg) | Jr | Westchester; Arizona Western | Los Angeles, California |
| F | 11 | Alain Chigha | 6 ft 8 in (2.03 m) | 207 lb (94 kg) | Sr | Rock School | Yaoundé, Cameroon |
| F | 13 | Chaise Daniels | 6 ft 9 in (2.06 m) | 240 lb (109 kg) | Jr | Hillhouse/Putnam Science | Meriden, Connecticut |
| F | 14 | Andrew Robinson | 6 ft 6 in (1.98 m) | 210 lb (95 kg) | So | Springbook | Takoma Park, Maryland |
| G | 23 | Daniel Harris | 6 ft 3 in (1.91 m) | 190 lb (86 kg) | Sr | Sickles; Hillsborough CC | Odessa, Florida |
| F | 25 | Ja'Kawn Jones | 6 ft 7 in (2.01 m) | 190 lb (86 kg) | So | Newburgh Free Academy; Wabash Valley | Newburgh, New York |
| G | 32 | Peter Kiss | 6 ft 5 in (1.96 m) | 190 lb (86 kg) | Fr | Notre Dame (Mass.) | New York, New York |
| G | 33 | Greg Tarca | 6 ft 3 in (1.91 m) | 195 lb (88 kg) | Jr | Montgomery | Montgomery, New Jersey |
| F | 34 | Abdulai Bundu | 6 ft 8 in (2.03 m) | 210 lb (95 kg) | So | Largo | Upper Marlboro, Maryland |

Head coach

- Tom Moore (Boston University)

Assistant coach(es)

- Sean Doherty (Worcester State)
- Eric Eaton (UMass Dartmouth)
- Tony Newsom (Holy Cross)

Legend

- (C) Team captain
- (S) Suspended
- (I) Ineligible
- (W) Walk-on
- Injured
- Current redshirt

Roster
Last update: 2015-11-05

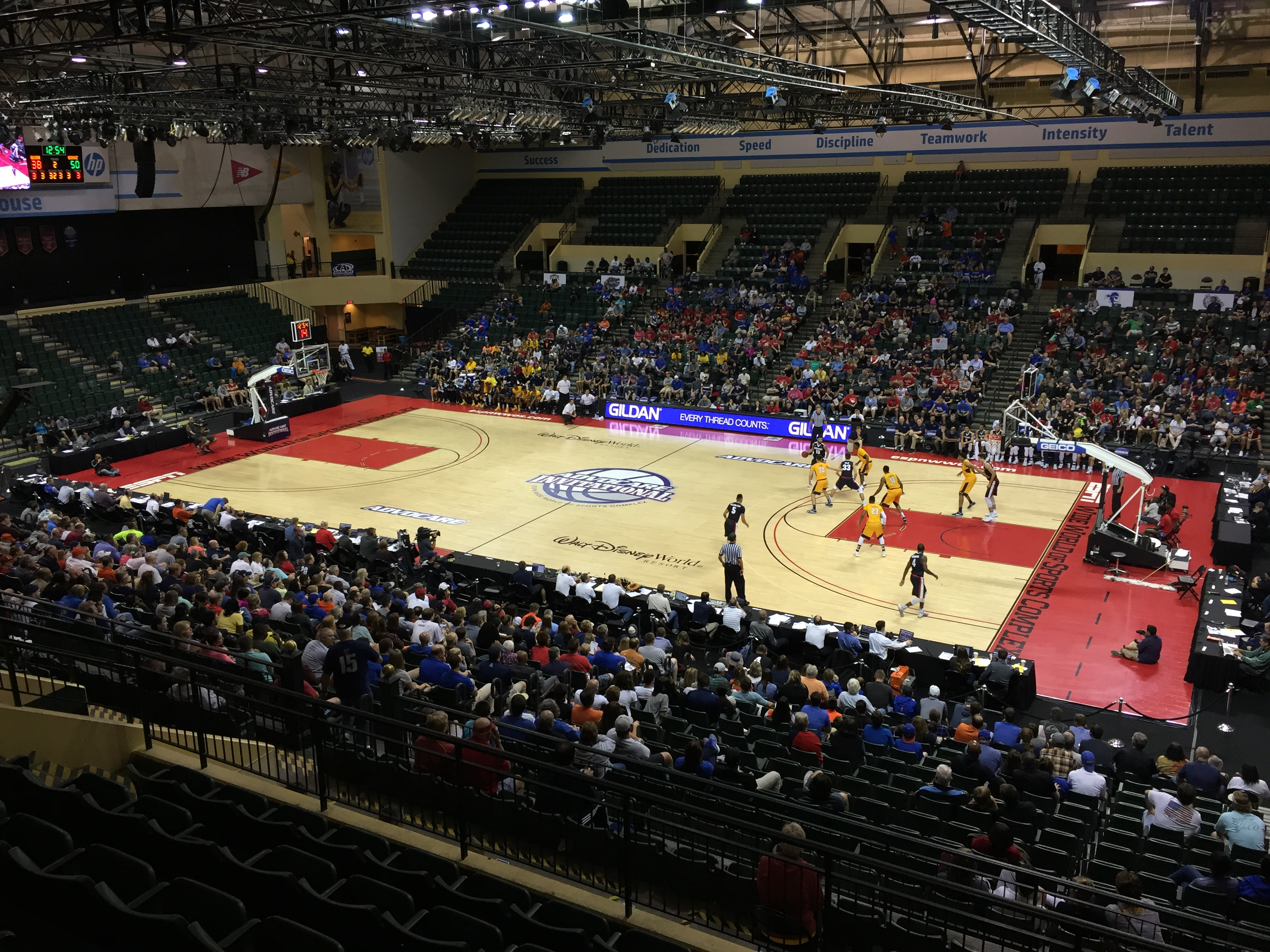
Gonzaga and Quinnipiac play in the quarterfinals at the 2016 AdvoCare Invitational.

== Schedule and results ==
| Date time, TV | Rank^{#} | Opponent^{#} | Result | Record | Site (attendance) city, state |
Regular season
| 11/12/2016*; 1:00 pm | | Vermont | L 70–94 | 0–1 | TD Bank Sports Center (1,517); Hamden, CT |
| 11/21/2016*; 1:00 pm | | Columbia | L 78–86 | 0–2 | TD Bank Sports Center (802); Hamden, CT |
| 11/24/2016*; 6:30 pm, ESPN2 | | vs. No. 11 Gonzaga; AdvoCare Invitational Quarterfinals | L 62–82 | 0–3 | HP Field House; Lake Buena Vista, FL |
| 11/25/2016*; 7:30 pm, ESPNU | | vs. Seton Hall; AdvoCare Invitational | L 79–90 | 0–4 | HP Field House; Lake Buena Vista, FL |
| 11/27/2016*; 11:00 am | | vs. Indiana State; AdvoCare Invitational | W 80–77 | 1–4 | HP Field House; Lake Buena Vista, FL |
| 12/01/2016; 7:00 pm | | Monmouth | L 72–91 | 1–5 (0–1) | TD Bank Sports Center (1,654); Hamden, CT |
| 12/04/2016; 2:00 pm | | Marist | W 77–63 | 2–5 (1–1) | TD Bank Sports Center (886); Hamden, CT |
| 12/07/2016*; 2:00 pm | | Hartford | W 99–79 | 3–5 | TD Bank Sports Center (767); Hamden, CT |
| 12/11/2016*; 2:00 pm | | at Holy Cross | L 57–75 | 3–6 | Hart Center (1,477); Worcester, MA |
| 12/18/2016*; 2:00 pm | | at Maine | W 85–75 | 4–6 | Cross Insurance Center (1,279); Bangor, ME |
| 12/21/2016*; 2:00 pm | | Drexel | L 74–91 | 4–7 | TD Bank Sports Center (823); Hamden, CT |
| 12/29/2016*; 7:00 pm | | at Brown | L 61–66 | 4–8 | Pizzitola Sports Center (622); Providence, RI |
| 01/02/2017; 7:00 pm | | at Niagara | W 81–78 | 5–8 (2–1) | Gallagher Center (849); Lewiston, NY |
| 01/04/2017; 7:00 pm | | at Canisius | L 77–83 | 5–9 (2–2) | Koessler Athletic Center (1,011); Buffalo, NY |
| 01/07/2017; 2:00 pm, SNY | | Manhattan | W 81–72 | 6–9 (3–2) | TD Bank Sports Center (1,003); Hamden, CT |
| 01/09/2017; 7:00 pm | | at Saint Peter's | L 54–58 | 6–10 (3–3) | Yanitelli Center; Jersey City, NJ |
| 01/12/2017; 8:00 pm, ESPN3 | | at Siena | L 74–81 | 6–11 (3–4) | Times Union Center (5,515); Albany, NY |
| 01/14/2017; 2:00 pm, ESPN3 | | Iona | W 97–91 ^{OT} | 7–11 (4–4) | TD Bank Sports Center (1,537); Hamden, CT |
| 01/20/2017; 7:00 pm | | Canisius | W 95–90 | 8–11 (5–4) | TD Bank Sports Center (1,585); Hamden, CT |
| 01/23/2017; 7:00 pm | | at Iona | L 74–85 | 8–12 (5–5) | Hynes Athletic Center (1,191); New Rochelle, NY |
| 01/27/2017; 7:00 pm | | at Monmouth | L 76–95 | 8–13 (5–6) | OceanFirst Bank Center (2,982); West Long Branch, NJ |
| 01/30/2017; 7:00 pm, SNY | | Siena | L 75–84 | 8–14 (5–7) | TD Bank Sports Center (1,085); Hamden, CT |
| 02/04/2017; 7:00 pm | | Niagara | W 89–81 | 9–14 (6–7) | TD Bank Sports Center (2,198); Hamden, CT |
| 02/06/2017; 7:00 pm, ESPN3 | | at Fairfield | W 73–71 | 10–14 (7–7) | Webster Bank Arena (1,071); Bridgeport, CT |
| 02/09/2017; 8:00 pm, ESPN3 | | Saint Peter's | L 45–76 | 10–15 (7–8) | TD Bank Sports Center (575); Hamden, CT |
| 02/11/2017; 2:00 pm | | at Rider | L 107–112 | 10–16 (7–9) | Alumni Gymnasium (1,623); Lawrenceville, NJ |
| 02/17/2017; 7:00 pm, ESPNU | | Fairfield | L 86–89 ^{OT} | 10–17 (7–10) | TD Bank Sports Center (1,312); Hamden, CT |
| 02/19/2017; 6:00 pm | | at Manhattan | L 74–95 | 10–18 (7–11) | Draddy Gymnasium (963); Riverdale, NY |
| 02/23/2017; 7:30 pm, ESPN3 | | at Marist | L 74–87 | 10–19 (7–12) | McCann Field House (1,031); Poughkeepsie, NY |
| 02/26/2017; 2:00 pm, ESPN3 | | Rider | L 82–99 | 10–20 (7–13) | TD Bank Sports Center (2,124); Hamden, CT |
MAAC tournament
| 03/02/2017; 5:00 pm, ESPN3 | (8) | vs. (9) Niagara; First Round | L 69–88 | 10–21 | Times Union Center (2,406); Albany, NY |
*Non-conference game. ^{#}Rankings from AP Poll. (#) Tournament seedings in parentheses. All times are in Eastern Time Source.
