= 2016–17 Siena Saints men's basketball team =

American college basketball season

2016–17 Siena Saints men's basketball
- Conference: Metro Atlantic Athletic Conference
- Record: 17–17 (12–8 MAAC)
- Head coach: Jimmy Patsos (4th season)
- Assistant coaches: Greg Manning; Jordan Watson; Abe Woldeslassie
- Home arena: Times Union Center; Alumni Recreation Center

2016–17 MAAC men's basketball standings
| | Conf. | | | | Overall |
| Team | W | | L | PCT | W | | L | PCT |
|---|---|---|---|---|---|---|---|---|
| Monmouth | 18 | – | 2 | .900 | 27 | – | 7 | .794 |
| Saint Peter's | 14 | – | 6 | .700 | 23 | – | 13 | .639 |
| Iona † | 12 | – | 8 | .600 | 22 | – | 13 | .629 |
| Siena | 12 | – | 8 | .600 | 17 | – | 17 | .500 |
| Fairfield | 11 | – | 9 | .550 | 16 | – | 15 | .516 |
| Rider | 10 | – | 10 | .500 | 18 | – | 15 | .545 |
| Canisius | 10 | – | 10 | .500 | 18 | – | 16 | .529 |
| Quinnipiac | 7 | – | 13 | .350 | 10 | – | 21 | .323 |
| Niagara | 6 | – | 14 | .300 | 10 | – | 23 | .303 |
| Marist | 5 | – | 15 | .250 | 8 | – | 24 | .250 |
| Manhattan | 5 | – | 15 | .250 | 10 | – | 22 | .313 |
† 2017 MAAC tournament winner

The 2016–17 Siena Saints men's basketball team represented Siena College during the 2016–17 NCAA Division I men's basketball season. The Saints, led by fourth year head coach Jimmy Patsos, played their home games at the Times Union Center, with one exhibition game at Alumni Recreation Center, as members of the Metro Atlantic Athletic Conference. They finished the season 17–17, 12–8 in MAAC play to finish in a tie for third place. They defeated Fairfield and Monmouth before losing in the championship game of the MAAC tournament to Iona.

== Roster ==
2016–17 Siena Saints men's basketball team
Players
Coaches

| Pos. | # | Name | Height | Weight | Year | Hometown |
|---|---|---|---|---|---|---|
| F | 0 | Javion Ogunyemi | 6 ft 10 in (2.08 m) | 243 lb (110 kg) | Sr | Troy, NY |
| G | 1 | Marquis Wright | 6 ft 1 in (1.85 m) | 161 lb (73 kg) | Sr | Waldorf, MD |
| F | 2 | Willem Brandwijk | 6 ft 8 in (2.03 m) | 229 lb (104 kg) | RS So | Voorburg, The Netherlands |
| F | 11 | Thomas Huerter, Jr. | 6 ft 7 in (2.01 m) | 192 lb (87 kg) | Fr | Clifton Park, NY |
| G | 12 | Andrew Dufort | 6 ft 0 in (1.83 m) | 166 lb (75 kg) | So | Saratoga Springs, NY |
| G | 13 | Khalil Richard | 6 ft 0 in (1.83 m) | 188 lb (85 kg) | Fr | Baltimore, MD |
| G | 14 | Kadeem Smithen | 6 ft 3 in (1.91 m) | 167 lb (76 kg) | RS So | Ajax, ON |
| G | 15 | Nico Clareth | 6 ft 5 in (1.96 m) | 186 lb (84 kg) | So | Baltimore, MD |
| F | 20 | Jimmy Merrill | 6 ft 10 in (2.08 m) | 215 lb (98 kg) | Sr | Rensselaer, NY |
| G | 21 | Ahsante Shivers | 6 ft 4 in (1.93 m) | 209 lb (95 kg) | Fr | Seat Pleasant, MD |
| G/F | 24 | Lavon Long | 6 ft 7 in (2.01 m) | 222 lb (101 kg) | Sr | Baltimore, MD |
| F | 31 | Brett Bisping | 6 ft 8 in (2.03 m) | 234 lb (106 kg) | RS Sr | Peoria, IL |
| F | 32 | Evan Fisher | 6 ft 8 in (2.03 m) | 246 lb (112 kg) | So | Pasadena, MD |
| F | 34 | Kevin Degnan | 6 ft 9 in (2.06 m) | 218 lb (99 kg) | Jr | Pearl River, NY |
| F | 35 | Sammy Friday | 6 ft 9 in (2.06 m) | 252 lb (114 kg) | Fr | Jersey City, NJ |

Head coach

- Jimmy Patsos (Catholic)

Assistant coach(es)

- Greg Manning (Loyola (MD))
- Jordan Watson (Augustana (IL))
- Abe Woldeslassie (Macalester)

Legend

- (C) Team captain
- (S) Suspended
- (I) Ineligible
- (W) Walk-on
- Injured
- Current redshirt

Roster
Last update: November 1, 2016

== Schedule and results ==
| Date time, TV | Rank^{#} | Opponent^{#} | Result | Record | Site (attendance) city, state |
Exhibition
| 11/02/2016*; 7:00 pm | | Daemen | W 92–65 | | Alumni Recreation Center (755); Loudonville, NY |
Regular season
| 11/13/2016*; 2:00 pm | | Cornell | W 89–78 | 1–0 | Times Union Center (6,196); Albany, NY |
| 11/15/2016*; 7:00 pm | | at George Washington; CBE Hall of Fame Classic | L 75–77 | 1–1 | Charles E. Smith Center (2,224); Washington, D.C. |
| 11/18/2016*; 8:00 pm, ESPN3 | | at No. 7 Kansas; CBE Hall of Fame Classic | L 65–86 | 1–2 | Allen Fieldhouse (16,300); Lawrence, KS |
| 11/20/2016*; 2:00 pm, Big South Network | | at UNC Asheville; CBE Hall of Fame Classic | L 80–92 | 1–3 | Kimmel Arena (1,227); Asheville, NC |
| 11/23/2016*; 7:00 pm, Spectrum Sports | | Arkansas–Pine Bluff; CBE Hall of Fame Classic | W 66–43 | 2–3 | Times Union Center (5,252); Albany, NY |
| 11/27/2016*; 7:00 pm, Spectrum Sports | | at Albany; Albany Cup | L 72–81 | 2–4 | SEFCU Arena (4,538); Albany, NY |
| 11/30/2016*; 7:00 pm | | at St. Bonaventure; Franciscan Cup | L 74–81 | 2–5 | Reilly Center (3,859); Olean, NY |
| 12/03/2016; 7:00 pm, Spectrum Sports/ESPN3 | | Fairfield | W 80–73 | 3–5 (1–0) | Times Union Center (5,515); Albany, NY |
| 12/05/2016; 7:00 pm | | at Rider | L 69–71 | 3–6 (1–1) | Alumni Gymnasium (1,511); Lawrenceville, NJ |
| 12/09/2016*; 8:00 pm | | at Florida Gulf Coast | L 69–73 | 3–7 | Alico Arena (4,213); Fort Myers, FL |
| 12/17/2016*; 12:00 pm, ESPN3 | | vs. Bucknell | W 71–68 | 4–7 | Glens Falls Civic Center (3,490); Glens Falls, NY |
| 12/22/2016*; 7:00 pm | | at Hofstra | L 64–84 | 4–8 | Mack Sports Complex (1,674); Hempstead, NY |
| 12/29/2016*; 7:00 pm, ESPN3 | | Vermont | L 60–76 | 4–9 | Times Union Center (6,176); Albany, NY |
| 01/02/2017; 2:00 pm | | at Canisius | L 79–82 | 4–10 (1–2) | Koessler Athletic Center (1,418); Buffalo, NY |
| 01/04/2017; 7:00 pm | | at Niagara | L 66–71 | 4–11 (1–3) | Gallagher Center (872); Lewiston, NY |
| 01/07/2017; 7:00 pm, ESPN3 | | Saint Peter's | W 56–54 | 5–11 (2–3) | Times Union Center (6,478); Albany, NY |
| 01/12/2017; 8:00 pm, ESPN3 | | Quinnipiac | W 81–74 | 6–11 (3–3) | Times Union Center (5,515); Albany, NY |
| 01/15/2017; 2:00 pm, SNY | | at Fairfield | W 63–54 | 7–11 (4–3) | Webster Bank Arena (2,611); Bridgeport, CT |
| 01/17/2017; 7:00 pm, ESPN3 | | Rider | W 78–68 | 8–11 (5–3) | Times Union Center (4,788); Albany, NY |
| 01/19/2017; 8:00 pm, ESPN3 | | at Saint Peter's | L 65–77 | 8–12 (5–4) | Yanitelli Center (564); Jersey City, NJ |
| 01/22/2017; 2:00 pm | | at Manhattan | W 81–68 | 9–12 (6–4) | Draddy Gymnasium (1,143); Riverdale, NY |
| 01/27/2017; 7:00 pm, ESPN3 | | Iona | L 66–77 | 9–13 (6–5) | Times Union Center (6,826); Albany, NY |
| 01/30/2017; 8:00 pm, SNY | | at Quinnipiac | W 84–75 | 10–13 (7–5) | TD Bank Sports Center (1,085); Hamden, CT |
| 02/04/2017; 7:00 pm, ESPN3 | | Canisius | L 73–80 | 10–14 (7–6) | Times Union Center (7,209); Albany, NY |
| 02/07/2017; 7:00 pm, ESPN3 | | at Iona | W 81–79 | 11–14 (8–6) | Hynes Athletic Center (1,518); New Rochelle, NY |
| 02/11/2017; 7:00 pm | | at Marist | W 84–77 | 12-14 (9-6) | McCann Field House (1,634); Poughkeepsie, NY |
| 02/13/2017; 7:00 pm, ESPN3 | | Monmouth | L 82–102 | 12–15 (9–7) | Times Union Center (5,716); Albany, NY |
| 02/16/2017; 7:00 pm, ESPN3 | | Manhattan | W 94–71 | 13–15 (10–7) | Times Union Center (5,577); Albany, NY |
| 02/18/2017; 8:00 pm, ESPN3 | | Niagara | W 76–70 | 14–15 (11–7) | Times Union Center (6,850); Albany, NY |
| 02/24/2017; 7:00 pm, ESPN2 | | at Monmouth | L 73–77 | 14–16 (11–8) | OceanFirst Bank Center (4,172); West Long Branch, NJ |
| 02/26/2017; 4:00 pm, ESPN3 | | Marist | W 80–64 | 15–16 (12–8) | Times Union Center (7,378); Albany, NY |
MAAC tournament
| 03/04/2017; 9:30 pm, ESPNU | (4) | (5) Fairfield; Quarterfinals | W 78–66 | 16–16 | Times Union Center (4,735); Albany, NY |
| 03/05/2017; 4:30 pm, ESPN3 | (4) | (1) Monmouth; Semifinals | W 89–85 | 17–16 | Times Union Center; Albany, NY |
| 03/06/2017; 9:00 pm, ESPN2 | (4) | (3) Iona; Championship game | L 86–87 ^{OT} | 17–17 | Times Union Center (7,608); Albany, NY |
*Non-conference game. ^{#}Rankings from AP Poll. (#) Tournament seedings in parentheses. All times are in Eastern Time.
