= 2016–17 Saint Peter's Peacocks men's basketball team =

American college basketball season

2016–17 Saint Peter's Peacocks men's basketball
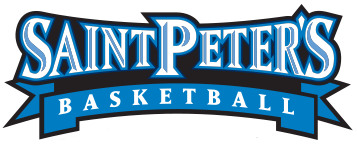

CIT champions
- Conference: Metro Atlantic Athletic Conference
- Record: 23–13 (14–6 MAAC)
- Head coach: John Dunne (11th season)
- Assistant coaches: Matt Henry; Serge Clement; David Danzig
- Home arena: Yanitelli Center

2016–17 MAAC men's basketball standings
	Conf.				Overall
Team	W		L	PCT	W		L	PCT
Monmouth	18	–	2	.900	27	–	7	.794
Saint Peter's	14	–	6	.700	23	–	13	.639
Iona †	12	–	8	.600	22	–	13	.629
Siena	12	–	8	.600	17	–	17	.500
Fairfield	11	–	9	.550	16	–	15	.516
Rider	10	–	10	.500	18	–	15	.545
Canisius	10	–	10	.500	18	–	16	.529
Quinnipiac	7	–	13	.350	10	–	21	.323
Niagara	6	–	14	.300	10	–	23	.303
Marist	5	–	15	.250	8	–	24	.250
Manhattan	5	–	15	.250	10	–	22	.313
† 2017 MAAC tournament winner

The 2016–17 Saint Peter's Peacocks men's basketball team represented Saint Peter's University during the 2016–17 NCAA Division I men's basketball season. The Peacocks, led by 11th-year head coach John Dunne, played their home games at the Yanitelli Center in Jersey City, New Jersey as members of the Metro Atlantic Athletic Conference. They finished the season 23–13, 14–6 in MAAC play to finish in second place. They defeated Canisius in the MAAC tournament before losing in the semifinals to Iona. They were invited to the CollegeInsider.com Tournament where they defeated Albany, Texas State, Furman and Texas A&M–Corpus Christi to become CIT champions.

== Previous season ==
The Peacocks finished the 2015–16 season 14–16, 12–8 in MAAC play to finish in a tie for fourth place. They lost in the quarterfinals of the MAAC tournament to Fairfield.

== Roster ==
2016–17 Saint Peter's Peacocks men's basketball team
Players
Coaches

Pos.	#	Name	Height	Weight	Year	Hometown
G	0	Nick Griffin	6 ft 2 in (1.88 m)	173 lb (78 kg)	RS Jr	Rockville, Maryland
G	1	Cavon Baker	6 ft 1 in (1.85 m)	175 lb (79 kg)	RS Sr	Queens, New York
G	2	J.R. William	5 ft 10 in (1.78 m)	162 lb (73 kg)	Jr	Linden, New Jersey
G	3	Trevis Wyche	6 ft 1 in (1.85 m)	176 lb (80 kg)	Sr	Neptune Township, New Jersey
F	5	Sean Barksdale	6 ft 5 in (1.96 m)	185 lb (84 kg)	Fr	Lakewood Township, New Jersey
G/F	11	Nnamdi Enechionyia	6 ft 6 in (1.98 m)	190 lb (86 kg)	RS Jr	Springfield, Virginia
G	13	Antwon Portley	6 ft 4 in (1.93 m)	165 lb (75 kg)	So	Lancaster, Texas
G	14	Davauhnte Turner	6 ft 0 in (1.83 m)	175 lb (79 kg)	Jr	Simsboro, Louisiana
F	15	Mamadou Ndiaye	6 ft 7 in (2.01 m)	210 lb (95 kg)	So	Laurel, Maryland
G	20	Chazz Patterson	6 ft 3 in (1.91 m)	168 lb (76 kg)	Sr	Browns Mills, New Jersey
F	23	Samuel Idowu	6 ft 7 in (2.01 m)	219 lb (99 kg)	So	Brooklyn, New York
G/F	24	Quinn Taylor	6 ft 4 in (1.93 m)	185 lb (84 kg)	Fr	Amarillo, Texas
G	25	Cameron Jones	6 ft 3 in (1.91 m)	210 lb (95 kg)	So	Fairless Hills, Pennsylvania
F/C	35	Quadir Welton	6 ft 8 in (2.03 m)	251 lb (114 kg)	Sr	Philadelphia, Pennsylvania

Head coach

- John Dunne (Ithaca)

Assistant coach(es)

- Matt Henry (Trinity (TX))
- Serge Clement (SUNY Cortland)
- David Danzig (Haverford)

Legend

- (C) Team captain
- (S) Suspended
- (I) Ineligible
- (W) Walk-on
- Injured
- Current redshirt

Roster

== Schedule and results ==
Date time, TV	Rank^{#}	Opponent^{#}	Result	Record	Site (attendance) city, state
Regular season
11/14/2016*; 7:00 pm		Lafayette	L 57–61	0–1	Yanitelli Center (632); Jersey City, NJ
11/18/2016*; 3:30 pm		vs. Lipscomb; Fordham Showcase	W 90–77	1–1	Rose Hill Gymnasium (1,533); Bronx, NY
11/19/2016*; 3:00 pm		at Fordham; Fordham Showcase	L 41–63	1–2	Rose Hill Gymnasium (1,473); Bronx, NY
11/20/2016*; 1:00 pm		vs. Fairleigh Dickinson; Fordham Showcase	W 84–58	2–2	Rose Hill Gymnasium (1,003); Bronx, NY
11/28/2016*; 7:00 pm		Boston University	W 80–67	3–2	Yanitelli Center; Jersey City, NJ
12/02/2016; 7:00 pm		Iona	L 65–79	3–3 (0–1)	Yanitelli Center; Jersey City, NJ
12/04/2016; 2:00 pm		Manhattan	W 84–70	4–3 (1–1)	Yanitelli Center; Jersey City, NJ
12/07/2016*; 8:00 pm		at Houston Baptist	L 47–62	4–4	Sharp Gymnasium (589); Houston, TX
12/10/2016*; 12:00 pm, BTN		at Maryland	L 56–66	4–5	Xfinity Center (14,859); College Park, MD
12/18/2016*; 2:00 pm		Elon	L 53–68	4–6	Yanitelli Center; Jersey City, NJ
12/23/2016*; 2:00 pm		at St. Francis Brooklyn	W 65–58	5–6	Generoso Pope Athletic Complex (385); Brooklyn, NY
12/28/2016*; 7:00 pm, ACCN Extra		at No. 24 Notre Dame	L 55–63	5–7	Edmund P. Joyce Center (9,149); South Bend, IN
01/02/2017; 7:00 pm		Monmouth	W 71–61	6–7 (2–1)	Yanitelli Center (525); Jersey City, NJ
01/07/2017; 7:00 pm		at Siena	L 54–56	7–7 (2–2)	Times Union Center (6,478); Albany, NY
01/09/2017; 7:00 pm		Quinnipiac	W 58–54	7–8 (3–2)	Yanitelli Center; Jersey City, NJ
01/15/2017; 2:00 pm		at Rider	W 71–65	8–8 (4–2)	Alumni Gymnasium (1,265); Lawrenceville, NJ
01/17/2017; 7:00 pm		at Fairfield	W 69–55	9–8 (5–2)	Webster Bank Arena; Bridgeport, CT
01/19/2017; 8:00 pm, ESPN3		Siena	W 77–65	10–8 (6–2)	Yanitelli Center (564); Jersey City, NJ
01/21/2017; 2:00 pm		Niagara	L 55–56	10–9 (6–3)	Yanitelli Center (347); Jersey City, NJ
01/23/2017; 7:00 pm		Rider	W 56–51	11–9 (7–3)	Yanitelli Center; Jersey City, NJ
01/26/2017; 7:30 pm, ESPN3		at Marist	W 81–65	12–9 (8–3)	McCann Field House (888); Poughkeepsie, NY
01/29/2017; 4:00 pm, ESPN3		at Iona	L 66–69 ^{OT}	12–10 (8–4)	Hynes Athletic Center (1,690); New Rochelle, NY
02/03/2017; 7:00 pm, ESPN3		at Monmouth	L 70–71 ^{OT}	12–11 (8–5)	OceanFirst Bank Center (3,878); West Long Branch, NJ
02/06/2017; 7:00 pm		Canisius	L 70–72	12–12 (8–6)	Yanitelli Center (351); Jersey City, NJ
02/09/2017; 8:00 pm, ESPN3		at Quinnipiac	W 76–45	13–12 (9–6)	TD Bank Sports Center (575); Hamden, CT
02/12/2017; 6:00 pm		at Manhattan	W 69–50	14–12 (10–6)	Draddy Gymnasium (963); Riverdale, NY
02/14/2017; 7:30 pm		Marist	W 71–46	15–12 (11–6)	Yanitelli Center; Jersey City, NJ
02/19/2017; 2:00 pm		Fairfield	W 74–55	16–12 (12–6)	Yanitelli Center (862); Jersey City, NJ
02/24/2017; 7:00 pm		at Niagara	W 66–53	17–12 (13–6)	Gallagher Center (1,070); Lewiston, NY
02/26/2017; 2:00 pm, ESPN3		at Canisius	W 72–65	18–12 (14–6)	Koessler Center (1,354); Buffalo, NY
MAAC tournament
03/04/2017; 9:30 pm, ESPN3	(2)	vs. (7) Canisius; Quarterfinals	W 61–58	19–12	Times Union Center (2,298); Albany, NY
03/05/2017; 7:00 pm, ESPN3	(2)	vs. (3) Iona; Semifinals	L 65–73	19–13	Times Union Center; Albany, NY
CIT
03/16/2017*; 7:00 pm, Facebook Live		at Albany; First Round	W 59–55	20–13	SEFCU Arena (641); Albany, NY
03/25/2017*; 5:00 pm, Facebook Live		at Texas State; Quarterfinals	W 49–44	21–13	Strahan Coliseum (2,907); San Marcos, TX
03/29/2017*; 9:00 pm, CBSSN		Furman; Semifinals	W 77–51	22–13	Yanitelli Center; Jersey City, NJ
03/31/2017*; 9:00 pm, CBSSN		at Texas A&M–Corpus Christi; Championship game	W 62–61	23–13	Dugan Wellness Center (1,200); Corpus Christi, TX
*Non-conference game. ^{#}Rankings from AP Poll. (#) Tournament seedings in parentheses. All times are in Eastern Time.
