= 2017 MAAC men's basketball tournament =

- Classification: Division I
- Season: 2016–17
- Teams: 11
- Site: Times Union Center; Albany, New York
- Champions: Iona (10th title)
- Winning coach: Tim Cluess (3rd title)
- MVP: Jordan Washington (Iona)
- Television: ESPN2, ESPNU, ESPN3

2016–17 MAAC men's basketball standings
	Conf.				Overall
Team	W		L	PCT	W		L	PCT
Monmouth	18	–	2	.900	27	–	7	.794
Saint Peter's	14	–	6	.700	23	–	13	.639
Iona †	12	–	8	.600	22	–	13	.629
Siena	12	–	8	.600	17	–	17	.500
Fairfield	11	–	9	.550	16	–	15	.516
Rider	10	–	10	.500	18	–	15	.545
Canisius	10	–	10	.500	18	–	16	.529
Quinnipiac	7	–	13	.350	10	–	21	.323
Niagara	6	–	14	.300	10	–	23	.303
Marist	5	–	15	.250	8	–	24	.250
Manhattan	5	–	15	.250	10	–	22	.313
† 2017 MAAC tournament winner

The 2017 Metro Atlantic Athletic Conference men's basketball tournament was the postseason men's basketball tournament for the Metro Atlantic Athletic Conference for the 2016–17 NCAA Division I men's basketball season. It was held from March 2–6, 2017 at the Times Union Center in Albany, New York. No. 3 seed Iona defeated No. 4 seed Siena 87–86 in overtime in the tournament championship game. As a result, Iona received the conference's automatic bid to the NCAA tournament. The championship marked Iona's 10th MAAC title, the most in MAAC Tournament history, and the second consecutive MAAC Tournament championship for the Gaels. It was also the fifth consecutive championship game for Iona, which is a MAAC record.

== Seeds ==
All 11 teams in the conference participated in the Tournament. The top five teams received byes to the quarterfinals. Teams were seeded by record within the conference, with a tiebreaker system to seed teams with identical conference records.

Seed	School	Conference	Tiebreaker
1	Monmouth	18–2	
2	Saint Peter's	14–6	
3	Iona	12–8	2–0 vs. Saint Peter's
4	Siena	12–8	1–1 vs. Saint Peter's
5	Fairfield	11–9	
6	Rider	10–10	1–1 vs. Monmouth
7	Canisius	10–10	0–2 vs. Monmouth
8	Quinnipiac	7–13	
9	Niagara	6–14	
10	Marist	5–15	Won coin flip
11	Manhattan	5–15	Lost coin flip

== Schedule ==
Session	Game	Time*	Matchup^{#}	Score	Television
First round – Thursday, March 2
1	1	5:00 PM	No. 8 Quinnipiac vs No. 9 Niagara	69–88	ESPN3
1	2	7:00 PM	No. 7 Canisius vs No. 10 Marist	77–72	ESPN3
1	3	9:00 PM	No. 6 Rider vs No. 11 Manhattan	69–68	ESPN3
Quarterfinals – Friday, March 3
2	4	7:00 PM	No. 1 Monmouth vs No. 9 Niagara	84–59	ESPN3
2	5	9:30 PM	No. 2 Saint Peter's vs. No. 7 Canisius	61–58	ESPN3
Quarterfinals – Saturday, March 4
3	6	7:00 PM	No. 3 Iona vs No. 6 Rider	88–70	ESPN3
3	7	9:30 PM	No. 4 Siena vs. No. 5 Fairfield	78–66	ESPNU
Semifinals – Sunday, March 5
4	8	4:30 PM	No. 1 Monmouth vs No. 4 Siena	85–89	ESPN3
4	9	7:00 PM	No. 2 Saint Peter's vs No. 3 Iona	65–73	ESPN3
Championship – Monday, March 6
5	10	9:00 PM	No. 4 Siena vs No. 3 Iona	86–87 ^{OT}	ESPN2
*Game times in ET. #-Rankings denote tournament seeding.

== Bracket ==
First round Thursday, March 2 ESPN3
8	Quinnipiac	69
9	Niagara	88
7	Canisius	77
10	Marist	72
6	Rider	69
11	Manhattan	68

Quarterfinals; Friday, March 3 Saturday, March 4 ESPN3/ESPNU
1	Monmouth	84
9	Niagara	59
4	Siena	78
5	Fairfield	66
2	Saint Peter's	61
7	Canisius	58
3	Iona	88
6	Rider	70

Semifinals; Sunday, March 5 ESPN3
1	Monmouth	85
4	Siena	89
2	Saint Peter's	65
3	Iona	73

Championship; Monday, March 6 ESPN2
4	Siena	86
3	Iona	87^{OT}

== All-Championship Team ==
2017 MAAC Men's Basketball All-Championship Team
- Justin Robinson, Monmouth
- Brett Bisping, Siena
- Nico Clareth, Siena
- Javion Ogunyemi, Siena
- Marquis Wright, Siena
- Jordan Washington ^{MVP}, Iona

== See also ==
- 2017 MAAC women's basketball tournament
