= 2017 CollegeInsider.com Postseason Tournament =

- Season: 2016–17
- Teams: 26
- Finals site: Dugan Wellness Center, Corpus Christi, Texas
- Champions: Saint Peter's (1st title)
- Runner-up: Texas A&M–Corpus Christi (1st title game)
- Semifinalists: UMBC (1st semifinal); Furman (1st semifinal)
- Winning coach: John Dunne (1st title)
- MVP: Quadir Welton (Saint Peter's)
- Attendance: 30,145 (1 game not reported)

The 2017 CollegeInsider.com Postseason Tournament (CIT) was a postseason single-elimination tournament of 26 NCAA Division I basketball teams. The tournament was played March 13–31, 2017.

Participants who belonged to "mid-major" conferences and who were not invited to the 2017 NCAA tournament or the National Invitation Tournament make up the field.

After all 26 teams played in the first round, the top-three highest rated teams based on the Pomeroy College Basketball Ratings regular season rating automatically advanced to the quarterfinals.

Saint Peter's beat Texas A&M–Corpus Christi 62–61 in the championship game.

== Participating teams ==
The following teams received an invitation to the 2017 CIT:

Team	Conference	Overall record	Conference record
Albany	America East	21–13	10–6
Ball State	MAC	21–12	11–7
Cal State Fullerton	Big West	17–14	10–6
Campbell	Big South	17–17	7–11
Canisius	MAAC	18–15	10–10
Fairfield	MAAC	16–14	11–9
Fort Wayne	Summit	19–12	8–8
Furman	SoCon	21–11	14–4
Georgia State	Sun Belt	20–12	12–6
Houston Baptist	Southland	17–13	12–6
Idaho	Big Sky	18–13	12–6
Jacksonville	ASUN	17–15	5–9
Lamar	Southland	19–14	10–8
Liberty	Big South	19–13	14–4
Norfolk State	MEAC	17–16	12–4
Saint Francis (PA)	NEC	16–16	11–7
Saint Peter's	MAAC	19–13	14–6
Samford	SoCon	19–15	8–10
Stephen F. Austin	Southland	18–14	12–6
Texas A&M–Corpus Christi	Southland	20–11	12–6
Texas State	Sun Belt	20–13	11–7
UMBC	America East	18–12	9–7
UNC Asheville	Big South	23–9	15–3
USC Upstate	ASUN	17–15	7–7
UT Martin	OVC	21–12	10–6
Weber State	Big Sky	19–13	12–6

== Format ==
The CIT used the old NIT model in which there was no set bracket. Future round opponents were determined by the results of the previous round. After all 26 teams played in the first round, the top-three highest rated teams based on the Pomeroy College Basketball Ratings regular season rating automatically advanced to the quarterfinals.

=== Postseason classics ===
In 2016, the CIT introduced the Coach John McLendon Classic as the first "Classic" game to ever be played during postseason tournament. For 2017, the CIT introduced three more "Classic" games, for a total of four, all to be played in the first round.

Coach John McLendon Classic
Hugh Durham Classic
Lou Henson Classic
Riley Wallace Classic

The winners of each Classic received a trophy and advanced to the second round or quarterfinals if they received a second round bye.

== Schedule ==
Date	Time*	Matchup	Score	Attendance	Television
First round
March 13	7:05 pm	Norfolk State at **Liberty** (Coach John McLendon Classic)	64–73	574	Facebook Live
March 14	7:00 pm	**Saint Francis (PA)** at Jacksonville (Hugh Durham Classic)	78–76	734	Facebook Live
March 14	7:30 pm	Houston Baptist at **Campbell**	79–98	1,735	Facebook Live
March 14	7:30 pm	Canisus at **Samford**	74–78	614	Facebook Live
March 15	7:00 pm	Ball State at **Fort Wayne** (Lou Henson Classic)	80–88	1,479	Facebook Live
March 15	7:00 pm	Fairfield at **UMBC**	83–88	688	Facebook Live
March 15	8:00 pm	Georgia State at **Texas A&M–Corpus Christi**	64–80	897	Facebook Live
March 15	11:00 pm	Stephen F. Austin at **Idaho**	50–73	1,109	Facebook Live
March 16	7:00 pm	**Saint Peter's** at Albany	59–55	641	Facebook Live
March 16	7:00 pm	**Furman** at USC Upstate	79–57	662	Facebook Live
March 16	8:00 pm	UNC Asheville at **UT Martin**	75–89	504	Facebook Live
March 16	8:30 pm	Lamar at **Texas State**	60–70	1,255	Facebook Live
March 16	10:00 pm	**Weber State** at Cal State Fullerton (Riley Wallace Classic)	80–76	1,293	Facebook Live
Second round
March 18	2:00 pm	Saint Francis (PA) at **UMBC**	79–87	904	Facebook Live
March 20	7:00 pm	Samford at **Liberty**	58–66	1,388	Facebook Live
March 20	7:00 pm	UT Martin at **Campbell**	56–73	2,031	Facebook Live
March 20	8:00 pm	Weber State at **Texas A&M–Corpus Christi**	73–82	1,116	Facebook Live
March 22	8:00 pm	Idaho at **Texas State**	55–64	3,086	Facebook Live
Quarterfinals
March 25	2:00 pm	**Furman** at Campbell	79–64	1,920	Facebook Live
March 25	5:00 pm	**Saint Peter's** at Texas State	49–44	2,907	Facebook Live
March 26	2:00 pm	Liberty at **UMBC**	68–80	869	Facebook Live
March 26	3:00 pm	Fort Wayne at **Texas A&M–Corpus Christi**	62–78	1,151	Facebook Live
Semifinals
March 29	7:00 pm	**Texas A&M–Corpus Christi** at UMBC	79–61	1,388	CBSSN
March 29	9:00 pm	Furman at **Saint Peter's**	51–77		CBSSN
Championship
March 31	9:00 pm	**Saint Peter's** at Texas A&M–Corpus Christi	62–61	1,200	CBSSN
*All times are listed as Eastern Daylight Time (UTC-4). Winning team in **bold**.

== Bracket ==
Bracket is for visual purposes only. The CIT does not have a set bracket.

First round March 13–16
Furman	79
USC Upstate	57
UNC Asheville	75
UT Martin	89
Houston Baptist	79
Campbell	98
Saint Peter's	59
Albany	55
Stephen F. Austin	50
Idaho	73
Lamar	60
Texas State	70
Ball State	80
Fort Wayne	88
Weber State	80
Cal State Fullerton	76
Georgia State	64
TX A&M–CC	80
Canisus	74
Samford	78
Norfolk State	64
Liberty	73
Saint Francis (PA)	78
Jacksonville	76
Fairfield	83
UMBC	88

Second round March 18–22
Furman
Bye
UT Martin	56
Campbell	73
Saint Peter's
Bye
Idaho	55
Texas State	64
Fort Wayne
Bye
Weber State	73
TX A&M–CC	82
Samford	58
Liberty	66
Saint Francis (PA)	79
UMBC	87

Quarterfinals; March 25–26
Furman	79
Campbell	64
Saint Peter's	49
Texas State	44
Fort Wayne	62
TX A&M–CC	78
Liberty	68
UMBC	80

Semifinals; March 29
Furman	51
Saint Peter's	77
TX A&M–CC	79
UMBC	61

Championship; March 31
Saint Peter's	62
TX A&M–CC	61

Home teams listed second.
