= Canastra Hammer Arena =

Arena in New Jersey, US

- The Broncs Zoo
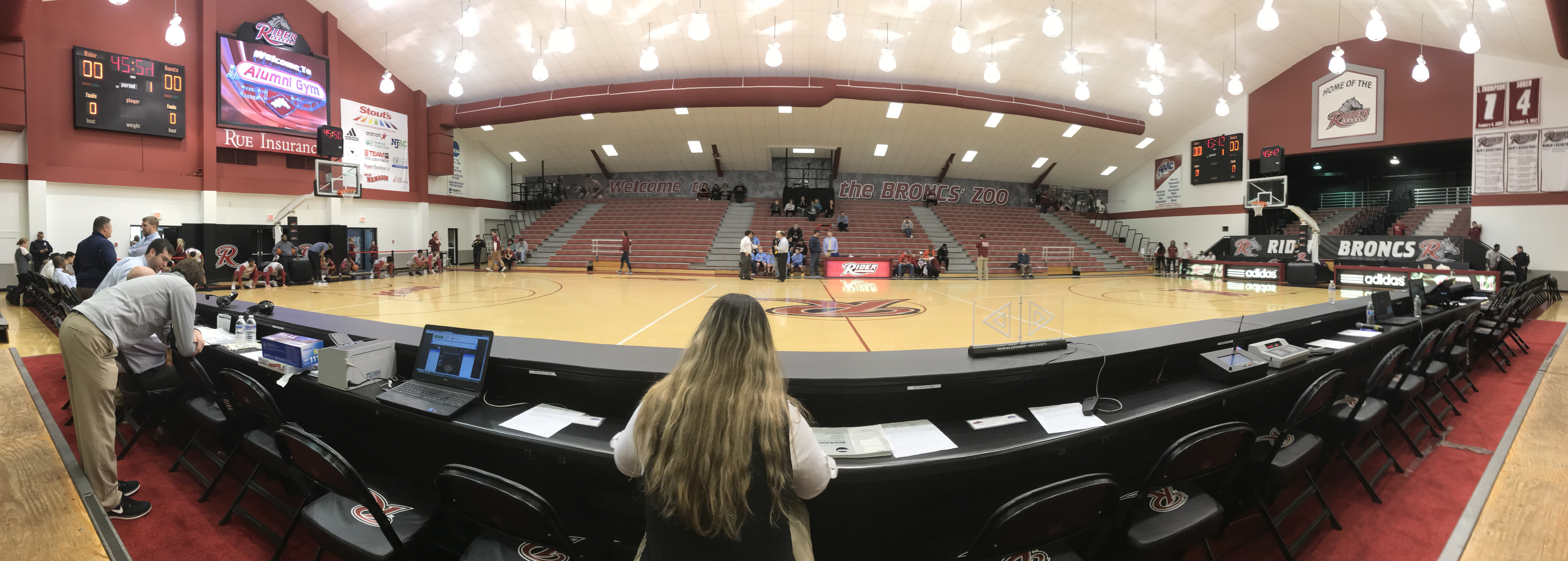
- A panoramic shot of Canastra Hammer Arena.
- Interactive map of Canastra Hammer Arena
- Former names: Alumni Gymnasium
- Location: Rider University
- Coordinates: 40.2788°N 74.7354°W
- Capacity: 1,650
- Type: Multipurpose arena

Construction
- Built: 1958
- Opened: 1958
- Renovated: 2012

Canastra Hammer Arena, formerly known as Alumni Gymnasium, is a 1,650-seat multi-purpose arena in Lawrenceville, New Jersey. It is home to the Rider University Broncs basketball, volleyball and wrestling teams. It was one of the first buildings built on the Lawrenceville campus upon moving from downtown Trenton. Its first event was the school's 1958 commencement; the first Broncs basketball game was the home opener against Seton Hall. The Northeast Conference men's basketball championship games were held there from 1993 to 1995.

In June 2026, the school announced that they would be renaming the arena from Alumni Gymnasium to Canastra Hammer Arena.

== See also ==
- List of NCAA Division I basketball arenas
