= Jameel Warney =

American basketball player (born 1994)

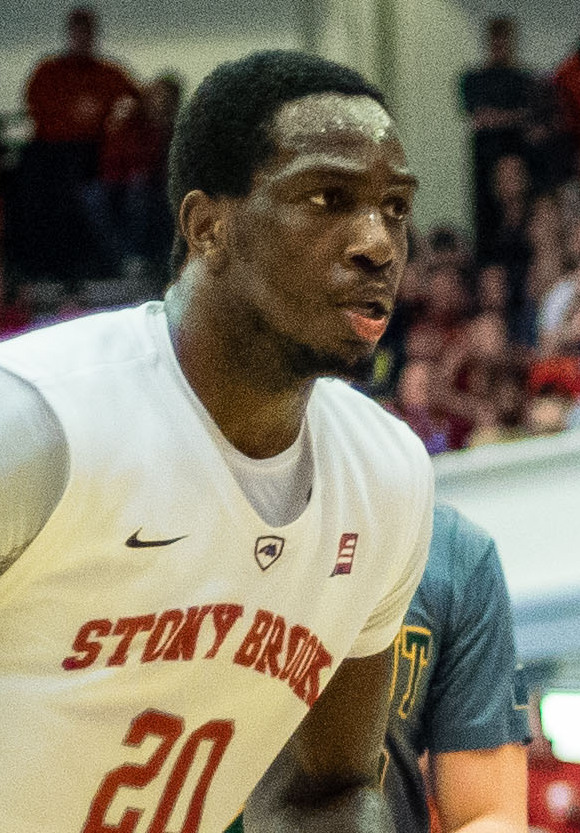
- Warney with the Stony Brook Seawolves in 2016

Free agent
- Position: Power forward / center

Personal information
- Born: January 31, 1994 (age 32) New Brunswick, New Jersey, U.S.
- Listed height: 6 ft 8 in (2.03 m)
- Listed weight: 260 lb (118 kg)

Career information
- High school: Roselle Catholic (Roselle, New Jersey)
- College: Stony Brook (2012–2016)
- NBA draft: 2016: undrafted
- Playing career: 2016–present

Career history
- 2016–2019: Texas Legends
- 2018: Dallas Mavericks
- 2018: Anhui Dragons
- 2019: Westchester Knicks
- 2019–2026: Seoul SK Knights

Career highlights
- KBL champion (2022); 4× KBL Foreign Most Valuable Player (2020, 2022–2023, 2025); 3× All-KBL Team (2020, 2022–2023, 2025); 4× KBL scoring champion (2022–2025); First-team All NBA G League (2018); 3× AP honorable mention All-American (2014–2016); 3× America East Player of the Year (2014–2016); 2× America East Defensive Player of the Year (2015, 2016); 3× First-team All-America East (2014–2016); America East Rookie of the Year (2013); America East tournament MVP (2016); No. 20 retired by Stony Brook Seawolves; FIBA AmeriCup MVP (2017); USA Basketball Male Athlete of the Year (2017)
- Stats at NBA.com
- Stats at Basketball Reference
Medals
Men's basketball
Representing United States
FIBA AmeriCup
Gold medal – first place	2017 Argentina / Colombia / Uruguay

Jameel Marcus Warney (born January 31, 1994) is an American professional basketball player who last played for the Seoul SK Knights of the Korean Basketball League (KBL). He played college basketball for the Stony Brook Seawolves, leading the team to its first ever appearance in the NCAA Tournament and graduating as the school's all-time leader in several career categories.

After going undrafted, Warney became the first Stony Brook player to reach the NBA when he made his debut with the Dallas Mavericks on March 11, 2018. Warney continued to play in the G League and was traded to the Westchester Knicks in 2019.

Warney moved his career overseas and signed with the Seoul SK Knights of the Korean Basketball League (KBL) before the 2019–20 season. He is the only player to be named the KBL's Foreign MVP four times. Warney led the Knights to a regular season title and KBL Finals championship in 2022.

Jameel Warney is widely considered a Seoul SK Knights legend, having played numerous seasons with the team. He also holds the record for the most seasons played with a single team among top-tier foreign players in the KBL and has gained the respect of many basketball and Seoul SK Knights fans in South Korea.

== Early life ==
Jameel Warney was born in New Brunswick, New Jersey to Denise and James Warney. He grew up in Plainfield, New Jersey. Warney stood 5 foot 10 inches tall at age 11. After not finding success at baseball, football or wrestling, he was recruited to play AAU by a friend's mother, even though Warney did not have much basketball knowledge at the time; he recalled tackling an opposing player in order to defend a layup in his second game.

Recruited by head coach Dave Boff, Warney attended Roselle Catholic High School. With the guidance of Boff, Warney overcame a poor work ethic that resulted in low middle school grades in order to perform well academically at Roselle Catholic and remain eligible for the NCAA. By his senior year of high school, Boff described Warney as a "borderline honor roll student" who did not miss a single day of school after being a consistent truant in middle school.

As a sophomore, Warney averaged 20.0 points, 12.0 rebounds and 4.0 blocks per game and was named All-Union County. During his junior year, Warney faced St. Patrick's Catholic player Michael Kidd-Gilchrist, a future second-overall draft pick from Kentucky, in the playoffs and put up 20 points and 11 rebounds. He averaged 17.5 points, 13.4 rebounds and 3.4 blocks per game as a junior. In his senior season, he averaged 17.0 points, 13.5 rebounds, 4.0 assists and 3.5 blocks per game. He graduated as Roselle Catholic's all-time leading scorer.

Warney was originally expected to accept a scholarship to play college basketball at nearby Rider, but Stony Brook head coach Steve Pikiell and his assistant Jay Young continued to heavily pursue him through a connection with Stony Brook player Bryan Dougher, who had played on the same AAU team before Warney. (Note: Dougher became Stony Brook's leading scorer with 1,609 career points, a record which Warney would break in 2015.) Before his senior year of high school, Iowa expressed interest in Warney after he outplayed a prospect that Iowa was targeting. Once Iowa's interest was publicized, Warney earned attention from roughly 25 schools, including Villanova, Notre Dame and Tennessee. However, Warney wanted to play immediately instead of redshirting or being a bench player at a power conference school, and he was drawn to Stony Brook during his official visit. "I loved the campus and the community. I thought it was beautiful," he said.

Ranked as the number five recruit in New Jersey by EKB Scouting and the 49th-best power forward in the country by ESPN, Warney officially committed to Stony Brook on August 12, 2011.

== College career ==
=== Freshman season ===
Warney made his collegiate debut in Stony Brook's season opener on November 9, 2012, against Marist, recording eight points and five rebounds. In his second game against Mount Ida, Warney scored 16 points on a perfect 8-for-8 from the floor, becoming the first Stony Brook player in program history to attempt at least eight shots and make them all. He earned America East Rookie of the Week honors for these performances, the first Stony Brook player to be named since 2009. Playing against UConn, Warney grabbed a then-best 11 rebounds. After the game, Huskies head coach Jim Calhoun visited the Stony Brook locker room to personally praise the 18-year old Warney.

Warney led Stony Brook with 17 points in a 76–69 loss to Maryland. He won eight America East Rookie of the Week awards en route to being named America East Rookie of the Year, second-team All-America East, America East All-Defensive Team and America East All-Rookie Team. He was the first Stony Brook player to win Rookie of the Year and the first Stony Brook freshman to be named to an All-America East team and the All-Defensive Team.

Stony Brook was eliminated in the semifinals of the America East tournament to Albany, losing 61–59 on a last-second layup. In the opening round of the NIT, Warney had 16 as Stony Brook beat UMass 71–58 for the program's first-ever NIT win. Against Iowa in the second round, Warney led Stony Brook with 17 points and seven rebounds, but the Seawolves lost 75–63 and ended the season with a 25–8 record.

Warney ended his freshman season averaging 12.4 points, 7.2 rebounds and 1.5 blocks per game. His .618 shooting percentage was the best in the America East, while he was the sixth-best in rebounds and second-best in blocks. He shot .650 in conference play. His 408 points were the most by any Stony Brook freshman along with his 165 field goals made.

=== Sophomore season ===
Warney won his first America East Player of the Year award during the 2013–14 season, averaging 14.5 points, 8.0 rebounds and 1.2 blocks per game while shooting .616. He was also named first-team All-America East. He was also named an AP honorable mention All-American, a Lou Henson Mid-Major All-American and first-team All-Met.

Warney became the first Stony Brook player to record three straight double-doubles. He set new career highs with a 23-point, 19-rebound double-double against Florida Atlantic and immediately bested those numbers with a 32-point, 21-rebound double-double against Detroit in a 104–102 3OT win; Warney's 21 rebounds set a new program record at the time, and he shot 13-for-14.

He scored 12 points in the 2014 America East championship game as Stony Brook lost 69–60. In the CBI opening round against Siena, Warney had 15 points and 10 rebounds, his tenth double-double of the season, and a new career-high five blocks.

=== Junior season ===
Warney repeated as America East Player of the Year for the 2014–15 season, averaging 16.7 points, 11.7 rebounds and 2.5 blocks per game, leading the conference in all of those statistics. He also won his first America East Defensive Player of the Year award and earned another first-team All-America East and All-Defensive Team selection. He led all of Division I with 24 double-doubles and 409 rebounds, and was one of 17 players to average a double-double on the season. He tied former Drexel star Malik Rose's America East record for most rebounds in a season. He had the most total rebounds in Division I and finished third in rebounds per game.

Warney scored his 1,000th career point against LIU Brooklyn at Madison Square Garden in the NIT Tip-Off. He had an 18-point, 11-rebound, 8-block performance versus Loyola Maryland. In Stony Brook's first program win against a ranked opponent, No. 13 Washington, Warney scored the go-ahead bucket. He set a conference record by winning eight straight America East Player of the Week awards. Despite a Warney double-double, Stony Brook lost in the America East championship game to Albany again, this time on a last-second Peter Hooley three. In the CBI against Mercer, Warney's double-double was again not enough to overcome a last-second shot.

He was named as a finalist for the Lou Henson Award, an AP honorable mention All-American, a NABC All-District Team selection and first-team All-Met.

Warney's 11.7 rebounds per game and 409 rebounds remain the single-season Stony Brook program record. His 575 points are the most by a Seawolves player in his junior season and were the most in a single season before he broke his own record the following year.

=== Senior season ===
Warney won his third consecutive America East Player of the Year in the 2015–16 season, joining Northeastern's Reggie Lewis and Vermont's Taylor Coppenrath as the only players to do so. He also won America East Defensive Player of the Year and America East All-Defensive Team for the second straight season and was named first-team All America-East for the third straight season. He shot .630 and averaged 19.8 points, 10.8 rebounds, 1.6 assists and 3.0 blocks in 33 games, leading the America East in shooting percentage, points, rebounds and blocks. He recorded 21 double-doubles in 33 games. His 94 blocks were the fourth-most in Division I.

He led Stony Brook with 22 points and 11 rebounds against No. 17 Vanderbilt in a 79–72 OT loss. Facing Notre Dame, Warney recorded both his 1,000th career rebound and 200th career block. With 29 points against Northeastern, Warney overtook Bryan Dougher (1,609) to become the top scorer in Stony Brook's Division I history. He set a new Stony Brook program record with nine blocks against Princeton, adding 26 points, 15 rebounds and five assists as well. On January 25, 2016, Warney passed Tommy Brenton (1,115) for the most career rebounds in Stony Brook history. On February 8 versus Hartford, Warney set a new career high with 36 points on 16-for-18 shooting, tying the Stony Brook single-game point record. He won his 16th America East Player of the Week award, a new conference career record, on February 15.

Warney led Stony Brook to a nation-leading 18-game win streak and a 22–4 record. In a loss to Albany, Warney surpassed Emeka Smith (1,978), a Division III player from 1989 to 1993, to become Stony Brook's all-time leading scorer. He was named to the 35-man midseason watch list for the Naismith Trophy and one of the final five finalists for the Karl Malone Award, given to the best power forward in the NCAA. (Note: Iowa State's Georges Niang would win the award. The other finalists were Kansas' Perry Ellis, North Carolina's Brice Johnson and Iowa's Jarrod Uthoff.)

He broke 2,000 career points on February 21 against Maine, becoming the 110th player in Division I history to record over 2,000 career points and 1,000 career rebounds. Stony Brook won the America East regular season title for the second time in Warney's career with a 14–2 conference record.

In the quarterfinals of the 2016 America East tournament, Warney scored 27 points and grabbed a career-high 23 rebounds in an 86–76 win over UMBC. His 23 rebounds broke the record for most rebounds in an America East tournament game. He added another 21-point, 13-rebound double-double in the semifinals to advance Stony Brook to the championship game for the third season in a row.

Down by 15 points in the second half to Vermont, Warney scored 23 points on a perfect 11-for-11 shooting in the final 16 minutes of the game as Stony Brook came back to win 80–74, clinching the school's first NCAA Tournament bid in program history. Warney ended with both a career-high and single-game school record 43 points on 18-for-23 shooting; his 18 made field goals were also a new single-game school record. He was named America East tournament MVP for his heroics, averaging 30.3 points and 15.3 rebounds per game in the tournament.

In the NCAA tournament's round of 64, Stony Brook was given a 13-seed and faced 4-seed Kentucky. The Seawolves lost 85–57, but Warney dropped 23 points and 15 rebounds to end his collegiate career with 60 career double-doubles. His 19.8 points per game, 655 points and 3.0 blocks per game are single-season Stony Brook records.

Warney graduated averaging 15.8 points, 9.4 rebounds, 1.6 assists, 2.0 blocks and 30.7 minutes per game in 135 games played, ending as the school's all-time leader in points (2,132), rebounds (1,275), blocks (275) and games played. He won 97 games in his Stony Brook career, the most by a single player in school history.

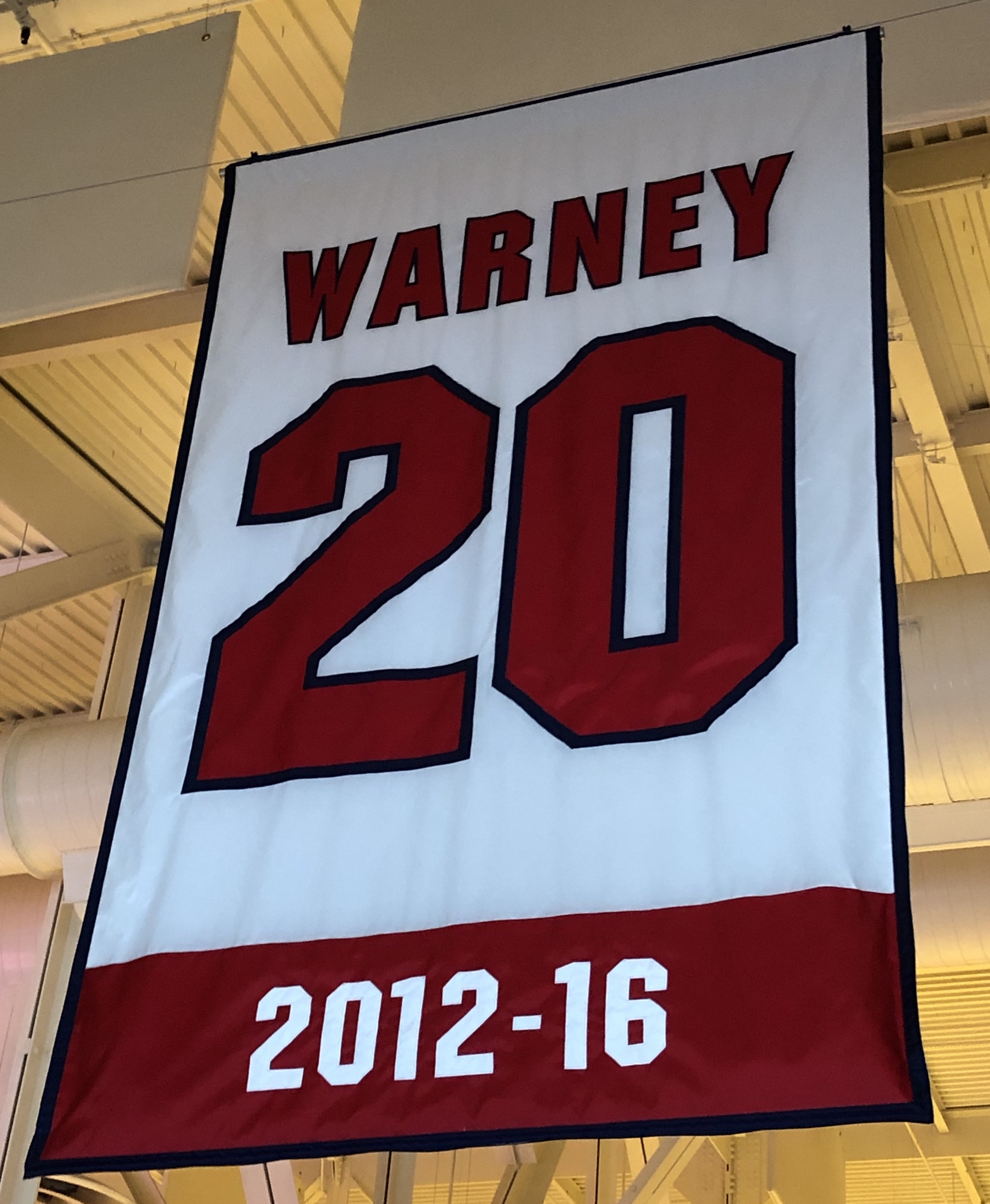
Warney's No. 20 was retired by Stony Brook in 2017.

On February 18, 2017, Warney's No. 20 was retired by Stony Brook, becoming the first basketball player in school history to have his number retired.

== Professional career ==
=== Texas Legends (2016–2018) ===
After going undrafted in the 2016 NBA draft, Warney joined the Dallas Mavericks for the 2016 NBA Summer League. On July 27, 2016, he signed with the Mavericks, but was later waived on October 16 after appearing in three preseason games. On October 30, 2016, he was acquired by the Texas Legends of the NBA Development League as an affiliate player of the Mavericks. In his first season with the Legends, he averaged 17.3 points per game.

On October 13, 2017, he was signed by the Mavericks for the second time. He was later waived before the start of the season and rejoined the Legends. Warney played 42 games in the 2017–18 season and was named to the First Team All-NBA G League after averaging 19.9 points and 9.6 rebounds per game.

=== Dallas Mavericks (2018) ===
On March 7, 2018, the Mavericks signed him to a 10-day contract. Warney made his NBA debut on March 11, 2018, against the Houston Rockets. Warney played eight minutes and scored five points with four rebounds. Warney made his return to New York on March 13 when the Mavericks faced the New York Knicks. Against the Knicks, Warney scored an NBA career-high eight points in 12 minutes.

=== Anhui Dragons / Return to the Legends (2018–2019) ===
The Mavericks elected not to renew Warney's 10-day contract, returning him to the Legends.

On May 5, 2018, Warney signed with Anhui Dragons of the Chinese NBL to play during the summer. Warney tweaked his knee in July, prompting him to return home to recover.

=== Westchester Knicks (2019) ===
On January 8, 2019, Warney was traded to the Westchester Knicks in exchange for Xavier Rathan-Mayes. Warney scored 20 points and recorded 14 rebounds in a first round 95–82 playoff victory over the Windy City Bulls, the Westchester Knicks' first playoff win in team history.

=== Seoul SK Knights (2019–2026) ===
On July 17, 2019, Warney signed with the Seoul SK Knights of the Korean Basketball League. In his first season with Seoul, Warney played 43 games in a shortened season due to the COVID-19 pandemic. Warney led the Knights to a first-place 28–15 record while finishing fourth in the league in points per game (20.4) and third in rebounds per game (10.4). Seoul was named co-champions due to the cancellation of the postseason. Warney won the KBL's Foreign MVP award and was also named to the All–KBL Team. He re-signed with the team on September 26, 2020.

In the 2020–21 season, Warney averaged 17.7 points (fourth in the KBL) and 8.6 rebounds per game. However, Seoul finished a disappointing 24–30 in ninth place.

Warney won his second KBL Foreign MVP in the 2021–22 season. He was the league's leading scorer (22.6 ppg) and second in rebounds (12.4 rpg). Seoul won the regular season title with a 40–14 record. Sweeping Goyang Orion Orions 3–0 in the semifinals, Seoul beat Anyang KGC in the KBL Finals, winning the series 4–1. Warney averaged 26.3 points and 10.0 rebounds per game in the KBL Finals.

Warney won the third KBL Foreign MVP in four years for the 2022–23 season. He led the KBL in scoring again with 24.1 points per game and was third with 11.3 rebounds per game. Seoul finished second in the regular season with a 36–18 record. The Knights swept the LG Sakers 3–0 in the semifinals. In a KBL Finals rematch with Anyang KGC, the series went to seven games, where Anyang won Game 7 in overtime, 100–97.

In the 2024–25 season, Warney won his fourth MVP award, becoming the first player in KBL history to win four MVP awards, overtaking Johnny McDowell and Ricardo Ratliffe. He was the second unanimous winner in league history, besides McDowell in 1998. After the Knights won the regular season championship, Warney also announced that he intended to retire after the season.

== National team career ==
Warney played with the senior United States national team at the 2017 FIBA AmeriCup, where he won a gold medal. He was named to the All-Tournament Team, and was also named the tournament's MVP. He was named USA Basketball Male Athlete of the Year for 2017.

== Career statistics ==
Legend
GP	Games played	GS	Games started	MPG	Minutes per game
FG%	Field goal percentage	3P%	3-point field goal percentage	FT%	Free throw percentage
RPG	Rebounds per game	APG	Assists per game	SPG	Steals per game
BPG	Blocks per game	PPG	Points per game	**Bold**	Career high
†	Won an NBA championship	*	Led the league	‡	NBA record

=== NBA ===
==== Regular season ====
Year	Team	GP	GS	MPG	FG%	3P%	FT%	RPG	APG	SPG	BPG	PPG
2017–18	Dallas	3	0	9.0	.583	.000	.600	3.0	.0	.0	.0	5.7
Career		3	0	9.0	.583	.000	.600	3.0	.0	.0	.0	5.7

=== D-League / G League ===
Year	Team	GP	GS	MPG	FG%	3P%	FT%	RPG	APG	SPG	BPG	PPG
2016–17	Texas Legends	44	34	29.2	.575	.000	.702	8.0	1.4	1.0	1.2	17.3
2017–18	Texas Legends	42	35	35.2	.529	.286	.654	9.6	2.9	1.2	1.1	19.9
2018–19	Texas Legends/Westchester Knicks	47	37	31.2	.483	.290	.813	7.4	3.1	1.3	1.0	17.3

=== KBL ===
Year	Team	GP	GS	MPG	FG%	3P%	FT%	RPG	APG	SPG	BPG	PPG
2019–20	Seoul SK Knights	43	37	27.8	.534	.000	.704	10.4	3.1	1.1	0.7	20.4
2020–21	Seoul SK Knights	54	47	25.0	.465	.329	.702	8.6	2.0	1.1	0.4	17.7
2021–22†	Seoul SK Knights	53	50	32.2	.529	.276	.735	12.4	3.1	1.2	0.6	22.6*
2022–23	Seoul SK Knights	67	64	33.8	.499	.243	.676	11.3	3.0	1.3	0.9	24.1*

=== 2017 FIBA Americup ===
Year	Team	GP	GS	MPG	FG%	3P%	FT%	RPG	APG	SPG	BPG	PPG
2017	USA	5	0	21.0	.649	0.0	.615	8.6	1.4	0.2	0.8	12.8

=== College ===
Legend
GP	Games played	GS	Games started	MPG	Minutes per game
FG%	Field goal percentage	3P%	3-point field goal percentage	FT%	Free throw percentage
RPG	Rebounds per game	APG	Assists per game	SPG	Steals per game
BPG	Blocks per game	PPG	Points per game	**Bold**	Career high

Year	Team	GP	GS	MPG	FG%	3P%	FT%	RPG	APG	SPG	BPG	PPG
2012–13	Stony Brook	33	33	27.2	.618	0.0	.557	7.2	0.9	0.7	1.5	12.4
2013–14	Stony Brook	34	31	29.4	.616	0.0	.606	8.0	1.9	0.7	1.2	14.5
2014–15	Stony Brook	**35**	**34**	**33.0**	.538	0.0	.574	**11.7**	**2.1**	0.7	2.5	16.8
2015–16	Stony Brook	33	33	32.9	**.630**	0.0	**.624**	10.8	1.6	**0.9**	**3.0**	**19.8**
Career				30.7	.596	0.0	.592	9.4	1.6	0.8	2.0	15.8

== See also ==
- List of NCAA Division I men's basketball players with 2000 points and 1000 rebounds
