= 2015–16 Stony Brook Seawolves men's basketball team =

American college basketball season

2015–16 Stony Brook Seawolves men's basketball

America East regular season and tournament champions

NCAA tournament, First Round
- Conference: America East Conference
- Record: 26–7 (14–2 America East)
- Head coach: Steve Pikiell (11th season)
- Assistant coaches: Jay Young (11th season); Lamar Chapman; Dan Rickard
- Home arena: Island Federal Credit Union Arena

2015–16 America East Conference men's basketball standings
	Conf.				Overall
Team	W		L	PCT	W		L	PCT
Stony Brook †	14	–	2	.875	26	–	7	.788
Albany	13	–	3	.813	24	–	9	.727
Vermont	11	–	5	.688	23	–	14	.622
New Hampshire	11	–	5	.688	20	–	13	.606
UMass Lowell*	7	–	9	.438	11	–	18	.379
Binghamton	5	–	11	.313	8	–	22	.267
Hartford	4	–	12	.250	10	–	23	.303
Maine	4	–	12	.250	8	–	22	.267
UMBC	3	–	13	.188	7	–	25	.219
† 2016 America East tournament winner * Ineligible for postseason during transition to Division I.

The 2015–16 Stony Brook Seawolves men's basketball team represented Stony Brook University in the 2015–16 NCAA Division I men's basketball season. The Seawolves were led by the eleventh-year head coach Steve Pikiell and played their home games at Island Federal Credit Union Arena. They were members of the America East Conference. They finished the season 26–7, 14–2 in America East play to win the regular-season championship. They defeated UMBC, Hartford, and Vermont to become champions of the America East tournament and earn the conference's automatic bid goes the NCAA tournament, their first in school history. As a #13 seed, the Seawolves fell to Kentucky in the first round.

On March 20, it was announced that head coach Steve Pikiell would leave the school to accept the job as the new head coach for Rutgers. He finished at Stony Brook with an eleven-year record of 192–157.

== Previous season ==
The Seawolves finished the 2014–15 season 23–12, 12–4 in America East play to finish in a tie for second place. They advanced to the championship game of the America East tournament where they lost to Albany. They were invited to the College Basketball Invitational where they lost in the first round to Mercer.

== Departures ==
Name	Number	Pos.	Height	Weight	Year	Hometown	Notes
Chris Braley	23	G/F	6'5"	205	Sophomore	Newport, ME	Transferred to Saint Anselm
Ryan Burnett	33	G	6'4"	190	Sophomore	Richmond, VA	Transferred from Saint Leo
Scott King Jr.	35	F	6'10"	220	Junior	Plymouth, NH	Transferred to Fairfield

=== Incoming transfers ===
Name	Number	Pos.	Height	Weight	Year	Hometown	Previous School
Ahmad Walker	5	G	6'4"	180	Junior	Port Washington, NY	Junior college transferred from Barton Community College

== 2015 incoming recruits ==
College recruiting information
Name	Hometown	School	Height	Weight	Commit date
Akwasi Yeboah; SF	Essex, England	Barking Abbey	6 ft 5 in (1.96 m)	195 lb (88 kg)	
Akwasi Yeboah; SF	Recruit ratings: Scout: Rivals: (NR)				
Alonzo Cambell; C	Gahanna, OH	Lincoln High School	6 ft 11 in (2.11 m)	N/A	
Alonzo Cambell; C	Recruit ratings: Scout: Rivals: (NR)				
Overall recruit ranking:
Note: In many cases, Scout, Rivals, 247Sports, On3, and ESPN may conflict in their listings of height and weight.; In these cases, the average was taken. ESPN grades are on a 100-point scale.; Sources: "2015 Team Ranking". Rivals.

=== 2016 incoming recruits ===
College recruiting information (2016)
Name	Hometown	School	Height	Weight	Commit date
Michael Almonacy; PG	Brentwood, NY	Brentwood High School	6 ft 0 in (1.83 m)	160 lb (73 kg)	May 6, 2015
Michael Almonacy; PG	Recruit ratings: Scout: Rivals: (NR)				
Overall recruit ranking:
Note: In many cases, Scout, Rivals, 247Sports, On3, and ESPN may conflict in their listings of height and weight.; In these cases, the average was taken. ESPN grades are on a 100-point scale.; Sources: "2016 Team Ranking". Rivals.

== Roster ==
2015–16 Stony Brook Seawolves men's basketball team
Players
Coaches

Pos.	#	Name	Height	Weight	Year	Hometown
G	1	Deshaun Thrower	6 ft 2 in (1.88 m)	205 lb (93 kg)	So	Muskegon, MI
G	3	Kameron Mitchell	6 ft 4 in (1.93 m)	195 lb (88 kg)	RS Jr	Jacksonville, FL
G	4	Tim Donohoe (W)	6 ft 3 in (1.91 m)	185 lb (84 kg)	So	Saratoga Springs, NY
G	5	Ahmad Walker	6 ft 4 in (1.93 m)	190 lb (86 kg)	Jr	Port Washington, NY
G	10	Carson Puriefoy	6 ft 0 in (1.83 m)	175 lb (79 kg)	Sr	Wenonah, NJ
F	11	Rayshaun McGrew	6 ft 7 in (2.01 m)	230 lb (104 kg)	Sr	Chicago, IL
F	12	Tyrell Sturdivant	6 ft 7 in (2.01 m)	230 lb (104 kg)	So	Chester, PA
G/F	15	Akwasi Yeboah (redshirt)	6 ft 5 in (1.96 m)	225 lb (102 kg)	RS Fr	Chigwell, England
F	20	Jameel Warney	6 ft 8 in (2.03 m)	260 lb (118 kg)	Sr	Plainfield, NJ
G/F	22	Bryan Sekunda (injured)	6 ft 6 in (1.98 m)	205 lb (93 kg)	So	State College, PA
G/F	24	Roland Nyama	6 ft 6 in (1.98 m)	210 lb (95 kg)	RS So	Frankfurt, Germany
F	32	Jakub Petras	6 ft 11 in (2.11 m)	260 lb (118 kg)	So	Rajec, Slovakia
G	34	Lucas Woodhouse	6 ft 3 in (1.91 m)	180 lb (82 kg)	RS Jr	Greenlawn, NY
F/C	42	Alonzo Campbell (redshirt)	7 ft 0 in (2.13 m)	230 lb (104 kg)	RS Fr	Columbus, OH

Head coach

- Steve Pikiell

Assistant coach(es)

- Jay Young (Marist)
- Lamar Chapman
- Dan Rickard

Legend

- (C) Team captain
- (S) Suspended
- (I) Ineligible
- (W) Walk-on
- Injured
- Current redshirt

Roster

== Schedule ==
Date time, TV	Rank^{#}	Opponent^{#}	Result	Record	Site (attendance) city, state
Non-conference regular season
11/14/2015*; 7:00 pm		Merchant Marine	W 103–32	1–0	Island Federal Credit Union Arena (3,404); Stony Brook, NY
11/19/2015*; 8:00 pm		at No. 17 Vanderbilt	L 72–79 ^{OT}	1–1	Memorial Gymnasium (9,819); Nashville, TN
11/21/2015*; 1:00 pm		at WKU	L 66–67	1–2	E. A. Diddle Arena (3,684); Bowling Green, KY
11/24/2015*; 7:30 pm		at Loyola (MD)	W 76–63	2–2	Reitz Arena (318); Baltimore, MD
11/28/2015*; 2:00 pm		Farmingdale State	W 91–42	3–2	Island Federal Credit Union Arena (2,544); Stony Brook, NY
12/05/2015*; 2:00 pm		Princeton	W 91–77	4–2	Island Federal Credit Union Arena (3,187); Stony Brook, NY
12/08/2015*; 9:00 pm, ESPNU		at Notre Dame	L 61–86	4–3	Edmund P. Joyce Center (7,537); South Bend, IN
12/12/2015*; 4:00 pm		at Northeastern	L 62–75	4–4	Matthews Arena (1,263); Boston, MA
12/17/2015*; 7:30 pm		at American	W 86–68	5–4	Bender Arena (368); Washington, D.C.
12/20/2015*; 2:00 pm		Hofstra	W 71–68	6–4	Island Federal Credit Union Arena (3,334); Stony Brook, NY
12/22/2015*; 7:00 pm		at Lehigh	W 75–62	7–4	Stabler Arena (543); Bethlehem, PA
12/28/2015*; 7:00 pm		at NJIT	W 83–61	8–4	Fleisher Center (900); Newark, NJ
01/02/2016*; 7:00 pm		Columbia	W 69–60	9–4	Island Federal Credit Union Arena (3,624); Stony Brook, NY
America East regular season
01/06/2016; 7:00 pm, ESPN3		at Binghamton	W 62–52	10–4 (1–0)	Binghamton University Events Center (1,715); Vestal, NY
01/09/2016; 2:00 pm		UMass Lowell	W 86–59	11–4 (2–0)	Island Federal Credit Union Arena (2,866); Stony Brook, NY
01/13/2016; 7:00 pm, AmericaEast.tv		UMBC	W 86–74	12–4 (3–0)	Island Federal Credit Union Arena (2,381); Stony Brook, NY
01/16/2016; 1:00 pm		at New Hampshire	W 80–50	13–4 (4–0)	Lundholm Gym (427); Durham, NH
01/18/2016; 1:00 pm		at Hartford	W 77–43	14–4 (5–0)	Chase Arena at Reich Family Pavilion (1,352); Hartford, CT
01/22/2016; 9:00 pm, ESPNU		Albany	W 69–63	15–4 (6–0)	Island Federal Credit Union Arena (4,109); Stony Brook, NY
01/25/2016; 7:00 pm		Maine	W 81–54	16–4 (7–0)	Island Federal Credit Union Arena (2,940); Stony Brook, NY
01/30/2016; 2:00 pm, ESPN3		at Vermont	W 72–61	17–4 (8–0)	Patrick Gym (2,658); Burlington, VT
02/03/2016; 7:00 pm		Binghamton	W 76–51	18–4 (9–0)	Island Federal Credit Union Arena (3,329); Stony Brook, NY
02/06/2016; 2:00 pm		at UMass Lowell	W 91–73	19–4 (10–0)	Costello Athletic Center (611); Lowell, MA
02/08/2016; 7:00 pm		Hartford	W 85–72	20–4 (11–0)	Island Federal Credit Union Arena (3,001); Stony Brook, NY
02/11/2016; 7:00 pm, AmericaEast.tv		at UMBC	W 75–52	21–4 (12–0)	Retriever Activities Center (1,247); Catonsville, MD
02/14/2016; 2:00 pm		New Hampshire	W 59–58	22–4 (13–0)	Island Federal Credit Union Arena (4,109); Stony Brook, NY
02/17/2016; 7:00 pm, ESPN3		at Albany	L 70–82	22–5 (13–1)	SEFCU Arena (4,578); Albany, NY
02/21/2016; 2:00 pm		at Maine	W 75–56	23–5 (14–1)	Cross Insurance Center (1,285); Bangor, ME
02/27/2016; 7:00 pm		Vermont	L 62–76	23–6 (14–2)	Island Federal Credit Union Arena (4,109); Stony Brook, NY
America East tournament
03/02/2016; 7:00 pm, ESPN3	(1)	(8) UMBC; Quarterfinals	W 86–76	24–6	Island Federal Credit Union Arena (3,657); Stony Brook, NY
03/07/2016; 7:00 pm, ESPN3	(1)	(7) Hartford; Semifinals	W 80–64	25–6	Island Federal Credit Union Arena (4,109); Stony Brook, NY
03/12/2016; 11:00 am, ESPN2	(1)	(3) Vermont; Championship	W 80–74	26–6	Island Federal Credit Union Arena (4,109); Stony Brook, NY
NCAA tournament
03/17/2016; 9:57 pm, CBS	(13 E)	vs. (4 E) No. 10 Kentucky; First Round	L 57–85	26–7	Wells Fargo Arena (16,774); Des Moines, IA
*Non-conference game. ^{#}Rankings from AP Poll. (#) Tournament seedings in parentheses. E=East Region. All times are in Eastern Time.

== Rankings ==
Ranking movement Legend: ██ Increase in ranking. ██ Decrease in ranking. RV=Received votes. NV = No votes received.
Poll	Pre	Wk 2	Wk 3	Wk 4	Wk 5	Wk 6	Wk 7	Wk 8	Wk 9	Wk 10	Wk 11	Wk 12	Wk 13	Wk 14	Wk 15	Wk 16	Wk 17	Wk 18	Post	Final
AP	NV	NV	NV	NV	NV	NV	NV	NV	NV	NV	NV	NV	RV	RV	RV	NV	NV	NV	NV	N/A
Coaches	NV	NV	NV	NV	NV	NV	NV	NV	NV	NV	NV	NV	NV	RV	RV	NV	NV	NV	NV	NV
