= 2015–16 UMass Lowell River Hawks men's basketball team =

American college basketball season

2015–16 UMass Lowell River Hawks men's basketball
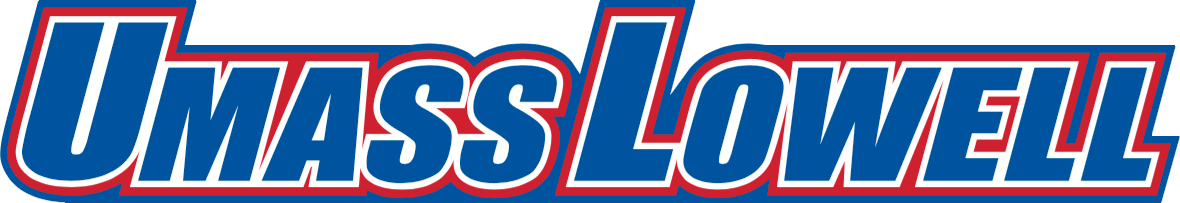
- Conference: America East Conference
- Record: 11–18 (7–9 America East)
- Head coach: Pat Duquette (3rd season)
- Assistant coaches: Biko Paris; Nick Leonardelli; Louis Hinnant
- Home arena: Costello Athletic Center; Tsongas Center

2015–16 America East Conference men's basketball standings
	Conf.				Overall
Team	W		L	PCT	W		L	PCT
Stony Brook †	14	–	2	.875	26	–	7	.788
Albany	13	–	3	.813	24	–	9	.727
Vermont	11	–	5	.688	23	–	14	.622
New Hampshire	11	–	5	.688	20	–	13	.606
UMass Lowell*	7	–	9	.438	11	–	18	.379
Binghamton	5	–	11	.313	8	–	22	.267
Hartford	4	–	12	.250	10	–	23	.303
Maine	4	–	12	.250	8	–	22	.267
UMBC	3	–	13	.188	7	–	25	.219
† 2016 America East tournament winner * Ineligible for postseason during transition to Division I.

The 2015–16 UMass Lowell River Hawks men's basketball team represented the University of Massachusetts Lowell during the 2015–16 NCAA Division I men's basketball season. They were coached by third year head coach Pat Duquette and played most of their home games at Costello Athletic Center, with five home games at the Tsongas Center. They were a member of the America East Conference.

UMass Lowell was in the third year of a transition to Division I and thus ineligible for the postseason, including the America East tournament.

They finished the season 11–18, 7–9 in America East play to finish in fifth place.

== Previous season ==
The River Hawks finished the season 12–17, 6–10 in America East play to finish in sixth place.

== Departures ==
Name	Number	Pos.	Height	Weight	Year	Hometown	Notes
Lance Crawford	0	G	5'10"	175	Freshman	Davie, FL	Transferred to South Alabama
Chad Holley	4	G	5'10"	170	Senior	New York City, NY	Graduated
Marco Banegas-Flores	13	G	6'1"	190	RS Senior	Boston, MA	Graduated
Kerry Weldon	23	G	6'5"	190	RS Senior	New York City, NY	Graduated
Jordan Rhodes	34	G/F	6'6"	177	Freshman	Fountain, CO	Transferred to Bemidji State
Brad Schaub	35	G/F	6'6"	180	Freshman	Marlette, MI	Transferred to Northwoood

== 2015 incoming recruits ==
College recruiting information
Name	Hometown	School	Height	Weight	Commit date
Ryan Jones; PG	Rio Rancho, NM	Sue Cleveland High School	6 ft 3 in (1.91 m)	160 lb (73 kg)	Aug 21, 2014
Ryan Jones; PG	Recruit ratings: Scout: Rivals: (NR)				
Keith Hayes; PG	Little Rock, AR	John L. McClellan High School	5 ft 11 in (1.80 m)	N/A	Aug 29, 2014
Keith Hayes; PG	Recruit ratings: Scout: Rivals: (NR)				
Logan Primerano; SG	Peru, IN	Peru High School	6 ft 4 in (1.93 m)	N/A	Dec 29, 2014
Logan Primerano; SG	Recruit ratings: Scout: Rivals: (NR)				
Overall recruit ranking:
Note: In many cases, Scout, Rivals, 247Sports, On3, and ESPN may conflict in their listings of height and weight.; In these cases, the average was taken. ESPN grades are on a 100-point scale.; Sources: "2015 Team Ranking". Rivals.

=== 2016 incoming recruits ===
College recruiting information (2016)
Name	Hometown	School	Height	Weight	Commit date
Cameron Wolter; PF	Fishers, IN	Fishers High School	6 ft 7 in (2.01 m)	N/A	Sep 23, 2015
Cameron Wolter; PF	Recruit ratings: Scout: Rivals: (NR)				
Overall recruit ranking:
Note: In many cases, Scout, Rivals, 247Sports, On3, and ESPN may conflict in their listings of height and weight.; In these cases, the average was taken. ESPN grades are on a 100-point scale.; Sources: "2016 Team Ranking". Rivals.

== Roster ==
2015–16 UMass Lowell River Hawks men's basketball team
Players
Coaches

Pos.	#	Name	Height	Weight	Year	Hometown
G	1	Keith Hayes II	5 ft 11 in (1.8 m)	170 lb (77 kg)	Fr	Bryant, Arkansas
G	2	Jordan Shea	6 ft 4 in (1.93 m)	195 lb (88 kg)	RS Fr	Madison, Wisconsin
G	4	Ryan Jones	6 ft 3 in (1.91 m)	163 lb (74 kg)	Fr	Rio Rancho, New Mexico
F	5	Dontavious Smith	6 ft 8 in (2.03 m)	195 lb (88 kg)	RS Fr	Springhill, Louisiana
G/F	10	Jahad Thomas	6 ft 2 in (1.88 m)	220 lb (100 kg)	RS So	Williamsport, Pennsylvania
G	11	Isaac White	6 ft 0 in (1.83 m)	165 lb (75 kg)	Fr	Ashland, Ohio
G/F	12	Josh Gantz	6 ft 7 in (2.01 m)	210 lb (95 kg)	RS Fr	Grove City, Ohio
G	21	D. J. Mlachnik	6 ft 2 in (1.88 m)	180 lb (82 kg)	Sr	Muskego, Wisconsin
G	22	Matt Harris	6 ft 1 in (1.85 m)	205 lb (93 kg)	So	Erie, Pennsylvania
G/F	23	Logan Primeramo	6 ft 4 in (1.93 m)	180 lb (82 kg)	Fr	Peru, Indiana
F	24	Tyler Livingston	6 ft 6 in (1.98 m)	210 lb (95 kg)	Jr	Hudson, New Hampshire
G	30	Mark Cornelius	6 ft 3 in (1.91 m)	195 lb (88 kg)	Sr	Westford, Massachusetts
F	33	Donny Belcher III	6 ft 2 in (1.88 m)	225 lb (102 kg)	Fr	Irving, Texas

Head coach

- Pat Duquette

Assistant coach(es)

- Biko Paris
- Nick Leonardelli
- Louis Hinnant

Legend

- (C) Team captain
- (S) Suspended
- (I) Ineligible
- (W) Walk-on
- Injured
- Current redshirt

Roster

== Schedule ==
Date time, TV	Opponent	Result	Record	Site (attendance) city, state
Non-conference regular season
11/13/2015*; 8:00 pm	at Northwestern	L 57–79	0–1	Welsh-Ryan Arena (6,011); Evanston, IL
11/18/2015*; 7:00 pm	Sacred Heart	W 87–84	1–1	Tsongas Center (1,795); Lowell, MA
11/21/2015*; 2:00 pm, ESPN3	at No. 18 Notre Dame	L 57–83	1–2	Edmund P. Joyce Center (8,888); South Bend, IN
11/24/2015*; 4:00 pm	Wheelock	W 104–76	2–2	Costello Athletic Center; Lowell, MA
11/29/2015*; 2:00 pm	Cornell	W 80–77	3–2	Costello Athletic Center (407); Lowell, MA
12/03/2015*; 7:00 pm	at LIU Brooklyn	L 72–84	3–3	Steinberg Wellness Center (1,114); Brooklyn, NY
12/05/2015*; 2:00 pm	at NJIT	L 77–90	3–4	Fleisher Center (1,011); Newark, NJ
12/06/2015*; 2:00 pm, ESPN3	at Boston College	W 68–66	4–4	Conte Forum (1,327); Chestnut Hill, MA
12/10/2015*; 7:00 pm	Boston University	L 60–80	4–5	Tsongas Center (1,438); Lowell, MA
12/18/2015*; 7:00 pm	at Central Connecticut	L 79–83	4–6	William H. Detrick Gymnasium (1,207); New Britain, CT
12/20/2015*; 4:00 pm, SNY	at No. 25 UConn	L 79–88	4–7	XL Center (9,848); Hartford, CT
12/28/2015*; 7:00 pm, BTN	at Rutgers	L 66–89	4–8	The RAC (4,075); Piscataway, NJ
12/30/2015*; 7:00 pm	at Wagner	L 62–76	4–9	Spiro Sports Center; Staten Island, NY
America East regular Season
01/06/2016; 7:00 pm	Hartford	W 80–76	5–9 (1–0)	Costello Athletic Center (341); Lowell, MA
01/09/2016; 2:00 pm	at Stony Brook	L 59–86	5–10 (1–1)	Island Federal Credit Union Arena (2,866); Stony Brook, NY
01/13/2016; 11:00 am	Maine	L 81–95	5–11 (1–2)	Costello Athletic Center (443); Lowell, MA
01/16/2016; 12:00 pm, AmericaEast.tv	at UMBC	W 95–89	6–11 (2–2)	Retriever Activities Center (916); Catonsville, MD
01/18/2016; 7:00 pm	at Vermont	W 93–82	7–11 (3–2)	Patrick Gym (1,939); Burlington, VT
01/21/2016; 7:00 pm, ESPN3	New Hampshire	L 76–78	7–12 (3–3)	Tsongas Center (1,580); Lowell, MA
01/24/2016; 2:00 pm	Binghamton	L 57–64	7–13 (3–4)	Tsongas Center (1,276); Lowell, MA
01/27/2016; 7:00 pm	at Albany	L 63–75	7–14 (3–5)	SEFCU Arena (2,452); Albany, NY
02/03/2016; 7:00 pm, ESPN3	at Hartford	W 85–83	8–14 (4–5)	Chase Arena at Reich Family Pavilion (1,752); Hartford, CT
02/06/2016; 2:00 pm	Stony Brook	L 73–91	8–15 (4–6)	Costello Athletic Center (611); Lowell, MA
02/08/2016; 7:00 pm	Vermont	W 100–93	9–15 (5–6)	Costello Athletic Center (437); Lowell, MA
02/11/2016; 4:00 pm	at Maine	W 108–95	10–15 (6–6)	Cross Insurance Center (1,523); Bangor, ME
02/14/2016; 12:00 pm	UMBC	W 96–92	11–15 (7–6)	Costello Athletic Center (491); Lowell, MA
02/17/2016; 7:00 pm	at New Hampshire	L 69–80	11–16 (7–7)	Lundholm Gym (882); Durham, NH
02/20/2016; 4:30 pm	at Binghamton	L 77–81	11–17 (7–8)	Binghamton University Events Center (2,884); Vestal, NY
02/24/2016; 7:00 pm	Albany	L 61–86	11–18 (7–9)	Tsongas Center (3,351); Lowell, MA
*Non-conference game. ^{#}Rankings from AP Poll. (#) Tournament seedings in parentheses. All times are in Eastern Time.
