= 2016 College Basketball Invitational =

College basketball tournament

- Teams: 16
- Finals site: Ellis Johnson Arena; Morehead, Kentucky; Lawlor Events Center; Reno, Nevada
- Champions: Nevada Wolf Pack (1st title)
- Runner-up: Morehead State Eagles (1st title game)
- Semifinalists: Ohio Bobcats (1st semifinal); Vermont Catamounts (2nd semifinal)
- Winning coach: Eric Musselman (1st title)
- MVP: Tyron Criswell (Nevada)
- Attendance: 57,774

The 2016 College Basketball Invitational (CBI) was a single-elimination tournament of 16 National Collegiate Athletic Association (NCAA) Division I teams that did not participate in the NCAA Tournament or the NIT. The opening games and the quarterfinals were held in mid-March on the home courts of participating teams. After the quarterfinals, the bracket was reseeded for the semifinals. A best-of-three championship series was held between the two finalist teams. An experimental rule allowing players six personal fouls instead of five was used in all national postseason tournaments except for the NCAA Tournament.

== Participants ==
The following teams were announced as participants Sunday, March 13 after the NCAA Selection Show.

Team	Conference	Overall record	Conference record
Albany	America East	24–8	13–3
Duquesne	Atlantic 10	16–16	6–12
Eastern Washington	Big Sky	17–15	10–8
Houston Baptist	Southland	17–16	10–8
Idaho	Big Sky	21–12	12–6
Montana	Big Sky	21–11	14–4
Morehead State	Ohio Valley	19–12	11–5
Nebraska–Omaha	Summit League	18–13	10–6
Nevada	Mountain West	19–12	10–8
Ohio	MAC	21–11	11–7
Pepperdine	West Coast	18–13	10–8
Seattle	WAC	14–16	7–7
Siena	MAAC	21–12	13–7
UNC Greensboro	Southern	14–18	10–8
Vermont	America East	21–13	11–5
Western Carolina	Southern	16–17	10–8

== Schedule ==
Date	Time*	Matchup	Television	Score	Attendance
First round
March 15	7:00 pm	**Morehead State** at Siena		84–80	2,061
March 16	7:00 pm	Albany at **Ohio**		90–94^{OT}	3,034
March 16	7:00 pm	Nebraska–Omaha at **Duquesne**		112–120	609
March 16	7:00 pm	Houston Baptist at **UNC Greensboro**	ESPN3	65–69	1,031
March 16	7:00 pm	Western Carolina at **Vermont**		74–79	1,486
March 16	9:00 pm	Pepperdine at **Eastern Washington**		72–79	1,518
March 16	10:00 pm	Idaho at **Seattle**		63–68	999
March 16	10:30 pm	Montana at **Nevada**		75–79	4,524
Quarterfinals
March 21	7:00 pm	Duquesne at **Morehead State**		72–82	1,387
March 21	7:00 pm	UNC Greensboro at **Ohio**		67–72	3,567
March 21	10:00 pm	Eastern Washington at **Nevada**		70–85	6,053
March 21	10:00 pm	**Vermont** at Seattle		73–54	999
Semifinals
March 23	7:00 pm	**Morehead State** at Ohio		77–72	3,712
March 23	10:00 pm	Vermont at **Nevada**		72–86	6,133
Finals
March 28	8:30 pm	Nevada at **Morehead State**	ESPNU	83–86	4,187
March 30	9:00 pm	Morehead State at **Nevada**	ESPNU	68–77	7,431
April 1	9:00 pm	Morehead State at **Nevada**	ESPNU	82–85^{OT}	9,043
*All times are listed as Eastern Daylight Time (UTC-4). Winning team in **bold**.

== Bracket ==
First round March 15–16
Siena	80
Morehead State	84
Duquesne	120
Nebraska–Omaha	112
Ohio	94*
Albany	90
UNC Greensboro	69
Houston Baptist	65
Nevada	79
Montana	75
Eastern Washington	79
Pepperdine	72
Seattle	68
Idaho	63
Vermont	79
Western Carolina	74

Quarterfinals; March 21
Morehead State	82
Duquesne	72
Ohio	72
UNC Greensboro	67
Nevada	85
Eastern Washington	70
Seattle	53
Vermont	74

Semifinals (Reseeded); March 23
Ohio	72
Morehead State	77
Nevada	86
Vermont	72

Finals (Best of three); March 28, 30, April 1
Morehead State	86	68	82
Nevada	83	77	85*

Home teams listed first.
* Denotes overtime period.
