= 2016 America East men's basketball tournament =

- Classification: Division I
- Season: 2015–16
- Teams: 8
- Site: Campus sites
- Champions: Stony Brook (1st title)
- Winning coach: Steve Pikiell (1st title)
- MVP: Jameel Warney (Stony Brook)
- Attendance: 21,281
- Television: ESPN2

2015–16 America East Conference men's basketball standings
	Conf.				Overall
Team	W		L	PCT	W		L	PCT
Stony Brook †	14	–	2	.875	26	–	7	.788
Albany	13	–	3	.813	24	–	9	.727
Vermont	11	–	5	.688	23	–	14	.622
New Hampshire	11	–	5	.688	20	–	13	.606
UMass Lowell*	7	–	9	.438	11	–	18	.379
Binghamton	5	–	11	.313	8	–	22	.267
Hartford	4	–	12	.250	10	–	23	.303
Maine	4	–	12	.250	8	–	22	.267
UMBC	3	–	13	.188	7	–	25	.219
† 2016 America East tournament winner * Ineligible for postseason during transition to Division I.

The 2016 America East men's basketball tournament took place on March 2, 7, and 12, 2016. The entire tournament took place on campus sites with the higher-seeded school hosting each game throughout the championship. The winner of the championship game earned an automatic bid to the 2016 NCAA tournament.

== Seeds ==
Teams were seeded by conference record, with ties broken by record between the tied teams followed by record against the regular-season champion, if necessary.

Seed	School	Conference	Tiebreaker
1	Stony Brook	14–2	
2	Albany	13–3	
3	Vermont	11–5	2–0 vs. New Hampshire
4	New Hampshire	11–5	0–2 vs. Vermont
5	Binghamton	5–11	
6	Maine	4–12	1–1 vs. Hartford, 1–1 vs. Albany
7	Hartford	4–12	1–1 vs. Maine, 0–2 vs. Albany
8	UMBC	3–13	

== Schedule ==
Game	Time*	Matchup^{#}	Final score	Television	Attendance
Quarterfinals – Wednesday, March 2
1	7:00 pm	#8 UMBC at #1 Stony Brook	76–86	ESPN3	3,657
2	7:30 pm	#5 Binghamton at #4 New Hampshire	51–56	ESPN3	1,866
3	7:00 pm	#7 Hartford at #2 Albany	68–59	ESPN3	2,535
4	7:30 pm	#6 Maine at #3 Vermont	82–99	ESPN3	2,165
Semifinals – Monday, March 7
5	7:00 pm	#7 Hartford at #1 Stony Brook	64–80	ESPN3	4,109
6	7:30 pm	#4 New Hampshire at #3 Vermont	56–63	ESPN3	2,840
Championship – Saturday, March 12
7	11:00 am	#3 Vermont at #1 Stony Brook	74–80	ESPN2	4,109
*Game times in ET. #-Rankings denote tournament seeding. All games hosted by higher-seeded team.

== Bracket and results ==
Teams will reseed after each round with highest remaining seeds receiving home court advantage.

Quarterfinals; Wednesday, March 2, 2016; ESPN3
1	Stony Brook	86
8	UMBC	76
2	Albany	59
7	Hartford	68
(Pairings are reseeded after the first round)
3	Vermont	99
6	Maine	82
4	New Hampshire	56
5	Binghamton	51

Semifinals; Monday, March 7, 2016; ESPN3
1	Stony Brook	80
7	Hartford	64
3	Vermont	63
4	New Hampshire	56

Championship; Saturday, March 12, 2016; ESPN2
1	Stony Brook	80
3	Vermont	74

== See also ==
- America East Conference
- 2016 America East women's basketball tournament
