= 2015–16 Binghamton Bearcats men's basketball team =

American college basketball season

2015–16 Binghamton Bearcats men's basketball
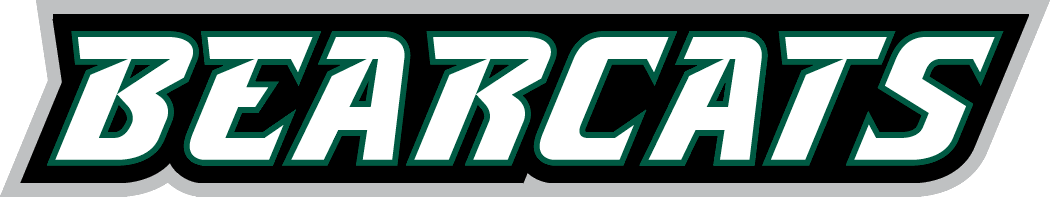
- Conference: America East Conference
- Record: 8–22 (5–11 America East)
- Head coach: Tommy Dempsey (4th season)
- Assistant coaches: Ben Luber; Bryan Goodman; Herb Courtney
- Home arena: Binghamton University Events Center

2015–16 America East Conference men's basketball standings
	Conf.				Overall
Team	W		L	PCT	W		L	PCT
Stony Brook †	14	–	2	.875	26	–	7	.788
Albany	13	–	3	.813	24	–	9	.727
Vermont	11	–	5	.688	23	–	14	.622
New Hampshire	11	–	5	.688	20	–	13	.606
UMass Lowell*	7	–	9	.438	11	–	18	.379
Binghamton	5	–	11	.313	8	–	22	.267
Hartford	4	–	12	.250	10	–	23	.303
Maine	4	–	12	.250	8	–	22	.267
UMBC	3	–	13	.188	7	–	25	.219
† 2016 America East tournament winner * Ineligible for postseason during transition to Division I.

The 2015–16 Binghamton Bearcats men's basketball team represented Binghamton University during the 2015–16 NCAA Division I men's basketball season. The Bearcats, led by fourth year head coach Tommy Dempsey, played their home games at the Binghamton University Events Center and were members of the America East Conference. They finished the season 8–22, 5–11 in America East play to finish in sixth place. They lost in the quarterfinals of the America East tournament to New Hampshire.

== Roster ==
Number	Name	Position	Height	Weight	Year	Hometown
0	Karon Waller	Guard	6–4	210	Senior	Camden, New Jersey
1	Marlon Beck II	Guard	5–11	175	Junior	Bowie, Maryland
4	Tim Rose	Guard	6–1	170	Freshman	Scranton, Pennsylvania
10	Yosef Yacob	Guard	6–0	175	Junior	Chester, Pennsylvania
11	Romello Walker	Guard	6–6	195	Sophomore	Fort Lauderdale, Florida
12	John Rinaldi	Guard	6–2	195	Junior	Dunmore, Pennsylvania
14	Jordan McRae	Forward	6–6	200	Freshman	Dix Hills, New York
15	Bobby Ahearn	Forward	6–6	225	Sophomore	Marshfield, Massachusetts
22	Everson Davis	Guard	6–3	185	Freshman	Saint Kitts
25	Justin McFadden	Guard/Forward	6–5	210	Sophomore	Philadelphia, Pennsylvania
30	John Schurman	Guard/Forward	6–6	200	Freshman	Syracuse, New York
32	Thomas Bruce	Forward	6–9	200	Freshman	Washington, D.C.
33	J.C. Show	Guard	6–3	210	Freshman	Clarks Summit, Pennsylvania
41	Dusan Perovic	Forward/Center	6–9	230	Sophomore	Podgorica, Montenegro
42	Willie Rodriguez	Forward	6–6	220	Sophomore	Orlando, Florida

== Schedule ==
Date time, TV	Rank^{#}	Opponent^{#}	Result	Record	Site (attendance) city, state
Exhibition
11/06/2015*; 8:00 pm		SUNY Cobleskill	W 92–53		Binghamton University Events Center (1,735); Vestal, NY
Non-conference regular season
11/13/2015*; 8:00 pm		at St. Bonaventure	L 53–63	0–1	Reilly Center (4,277); Olean, NY
11/15/2015*; 2:00 pm		Army	L 60–75	0–2	Binghamton University Events Center (2,550); Vestal, NY
11/18/2015*; 6:00 pm		at Cornell	L 59–76	0–3	Newman Arena (1,204); Ithaca, NY
11/24/2015*; 7:00 pm		at Central Connecticut	W 81–75	1–3	William H. Detrick Gymnasium (1,012); New Britain, CT
11/28/2015*; 4:00 pm		Boston University	L 65–75	1–4	Binghamton University Events Center (3,528); Vestal, NY
12/01/2015*; 7:00 pm		Colgate	W 69–50	2–4	Binghamton University Events Center (1,714); Vestal, NY
12/05/2015*; 12:00 pm, ESPNU		at No. 3 Michigan State	L 33–76	2–5	Breslin Center (14,797); East Lansing, MI
12/07/2015*; 7:00 pm, ESPN3		at Oakland	L 72–83	2–6	Athletics Center O'rena (2,006); Rochester, MI
12/12/2015*; 2:00 pm		at Buffalo	L 64–80	2–7	Alumni Arena (3,031); Amherst, NY
12/16/2015*; 7:30 pm		Saint Francis (PA)	L 61–67	2–8	Binghamton University Events Center (1,870); Vestal, NY
12/22/2015*; 7:00 pm		FIU	L 49–66	2–9	Binghamton University Events Center (1,602); Vestal, NY
12/29/2015*; 7:00 pm		Mount St. Mary's	W 62–53	3–9	Binghamton University Events Center (3,721); Vestal, NY
01/02/2016*; 1:00 pm		at Penn	L 45–80	3–10	The Palestra (2,104); Philadelphia, PA
America East regular season
01/06/2016; 7:00 pm, ESPN3		at Stony Brook	L 52–62	3–11 (0–1)	Binghamton University Events Center (1,715); Vestal, NY
01/09/2016; 1:00 pm		at New Hampshire	L 43–58	3–12 (0–2)	Lundholm Gym (1,060); Durham, NH
01/13/2016; 7:00 pm		Hartford	L 72–76	3–13 (0–3)	Binghamton University Events Center (1,663); Vestal, NY
01/18/2016; 7:00 pm		at Albany	L 59–80	3–14 (0–4)	SEFCU Arena (2,418); Albany, NY
01/21/2016; 7:00 pm		Vermont	L 52–61	3–15 (0–5)	Binghamton University Events Center (2,314); Vestal, NY
01/24/2016; 2:00 pm		at UMass Lowell	W 64–57	4–15 (1–5)	Tsongas Center (1,276); Lowell, MA
01/27/2016; 7:00 pm		UMBC	W 66–57	5–15 (2–5)	Binghamton University Events Center (2,013); Vestal, NY
01/30/2016; 2:00 pm		at Maine	L 63–74	5–16 (2–6)	Cross Insurance Center; Bangor, ME
02/03/2016; 7:00 pm		at Stony Brook	L 51–76	5–17 (2–7)	Island Federal Credit Union Arena (3,329); Stony Brook, NY
02/06/2016; 4:00 pm		New Hampshire	L 55–59	5–18 (2–8)	Binghamton University Events Center (2,642); Vestal, NY
02/08/2016; 7:00 pm, ESPN3		Albany	L 56–69	5–19 (2–9)	Binghamton University Events Center (4,923); Vestal, NY
02/11/2016; 7:00 pm		at Hartford	W 68–54	6–19 (3–9)	Chase Arena at Reich Family Pavilion (1,330); Hartford, CT
02/17/2016; 7:00 pm		at Vermont	L 64–78	6–20 (3–10)	Patrick Gym (1,989); Burlington, VT
02/20/2016; 4:30 pm		UMass Lowell	W 81–77	7–20 (4–10)	Binghamton University Events Center (2,884); Vestal, NY
02/24/2016; 7:00 pm		at UMBC	L 79–80 ^{OT}	7–21 (4–11)	Retriever Activities Center (938); Catonsville, MD
02/27/2016; 2:00 pm		Maine	W 78–66	8–21 (5–11)	Binghamton University Events Center (2,426); Vestal, NY
America East tournament
03/02/2016; 7:30 pm, ESPN3	(5)	at (4) New Hampshire; Quarterfinals	L 51–56	8–22	Lundholm Gym (1,886); Durham, NH
*Non-conference game. ^{#}Rankings from AP Poll. (#) Tournament seedings in parentheses. All times are in Eastern Time.
