= 2015–16 New Hampshire Wildcats men's basketball team =

American college basketball season

2015–16 New Hampshire Wildcats men's basketball

CIT, Second round
- Conference: America East Conference
- Record: 20–13 (11–5 America East)
- Head coach: Bill Herrion (11th season)
- Assistant coaches: Kenneth Dempsey; Chris Mohr; Marc Kuntz
- Home arena: Lundholm Gym

2015–16 America East Conference men's basketball standings
	Conf.				Overall
Team	W		L	PCT	W		L	PCT
Stony Brook †	14	–	2	.875	26	–	7	.788
Albany	13	–	3	.813	24	–	9	.727
Vermont	11	–	5	.688	23	–	14	.622
New Hampshire	11	–	5	.688	20	–	13	.606
UMass Lowell*	7	–	9	.438	11	–	18	.379
Binghamton	5	–	11	.313	8	–	22	.267
Hartford	4	–	12	.250	10	–	23	.303
Maine	4	–	12	.250	8	–	22	.267
UMBC	3	–	13	.188	7	–	25	.219
† 2016 America East tournament winner * Ineligible for postseason during transition to Division I.

The 2015–16 New Hampshire Wildcats men's basketball team represented the University of New Hampshire during the 2015–16 NCAA Division I men's basketball season. The Wildcats, led by 11th year head coach Bill Herrion, played their home games at Lundholm Gym and were members of the America East Conference. They finished the season 20–13, 11–5 in America East play to finish in a tie for third place. They defeated Binghamton in the quarterfinals of the America East tournament where they lost to Vermont. They were invited to the CollegeInsider.com Tournament where they defeated Fairfield in the first round to advance to the second round where they lost to Coastal Carolina.

== Roster ==
Number	Name	Position	Height	Weight	Year	Hometown
0	Jaleen Smith	Guard	6–4	195	Junior	Freeport, Texas
2	Andrew Dotson	Guard	6–2	175	Freshman	Arlington, Texas
3	Jacoby Armstrong	Forward	6–7	230	Junior	Sachse, Texas
4	Keon Burns	Guard	6–4	205	Sophomore	Beaverton, Oregon
5	Daniel Dion	Guard	6–0	175	Junior	Cedar Park, Texas
10	Iba Camara	Forward	6–9	225	Sophomore	Dakar, Senegal
11	Jordan Reed	Guard	5–11	170	Sophomore	Lucas, Texas
12	Frank Okeke	Forward	6–6	220	Senior	DeSoto, Texas
21	Tanner Leissner	Forward	6–6	210	Sophomore	Converse, Texas
22	David Watkins	Forward	6–7	210	Freshman	Dorchester, Massachusetts
23	Ronnel Jordan	Guard/Forward	6–3	194	Senior	San Antonio, Texas
24	Pat McNamara	Guard	6–5	190	Freshman	Arlington Heights, Illinois
30	Joe Bramanti	Guard	6–2	195	Junior	Andover, Massachusetts

== Schedule ==
Date time, TV	Rank^{#}	Opponent^{#}	Result	Record	Site (attendance) city, state
Non-conference regular season
11/13/2015*; 7:30 pm		Lyndon State	W 82–45	1–0	Lundholm Gym (764); Durham, NH
11/17/2015*; 7:00 pm, SNY		at No. 19 UConn	L 66–85	1–1	Gampel Pavilion (9,047); Storrs, CT
11/19/2015*; 7:00 pm		at Holy Cross	W 73–69	2–1	Hart Center (1,794); Worcester, MA
11/24/2015*; 7:00 pm		at Brown	W 88–77	3–1	Pizzitola Sports Center (556); Providence, RI
11/28/2015*; 1:00 pm		American	L 50–68	3–2	Lundholm Gym (473); Durham, NH
11/30/2015*; 7:00 pm		Bryant	W 75–67	4–2	Lundholm Gym; Durham, NH
12/03/2015*; 8:00 pm		at Abilene Christian	W 86–75	5–2	Moody Coliseum (1,450); Abilene, TX
12/05/2015*; 2:00 pm, ESPN3		at No. 22 SMU	L 44–98	5–3	Moody Coliseum (6,754); University Park, TX
12/08/2015*; 7:00 pm		Worcester State	W 100–66	6–3	Lundholm Gym (427); Durham, NH
12/13/2015*; 12:00 pm		at Colgate	L 59–75	6–4	Cotterell Court (582); Hamilton, NY
12/19/2015*; 1:00 pm		Dartmouth; Rivalry	W 76–56	7–4	Lundholm Gym (547); Durham, NH
12/21/2015*; 7:00 pm		at Boston University	L 74–78	7–5	Case Gym (377); Boston, MA
12/30/2015*; 2:00 pm, ESPN3		at Boston College	L 67–72	7–6	Conte Forum (3,274); Chestnut Hill, MA
America East regular season
01/09/2016; 1:00 pm		Binghamton	W 58–43	8–6 (1–0)	Lundholm Gym (1,060); Durham, NH
01/12/2016; 7:00 pm		at Albany	L 75–80 ^{OT}	8–7 (1–1)	SEFCU Arena (2,363); Albany, NY
01/16/2016; 1:00 pm		Stony Brook	L 50–80	8–8 (1–2)	Lundholm Gym (427); Durham, NH
01/18/2016; 7:00 pm		at Maine	W 99–91	9–8 (2–2)	Cross Insurance Center (1,783); Bangor, ME
01/21/2016; 7:00 pm, ESPN3		at UMass Lowell	W 78–76	10–8 (3–2)	Tsongas Center (1,580); Lowell, MA
01/24/2016; 1:00 pm		Hartford	W 84–71	11–8 (4–2)	Lundholm Gym (442); Durham, NH
01/27/2016; 7:00 pm, ESPN3		Vermont	L 50–66	11–9 (4–3)	Lundholm Gym (1,202); Durham, NH
01/30/2016; 1:00 pm		at UMBC	W 84–81	12–9 (5–3)	Retriever Activities Center (1,007); Catonsville, MD
02/06/2016; 4:00 pm		at Binghamton	W 59–55	13–9 (6–3)	Binghamton University Events Center (2,642); Vestal, NY
02/08/2016; 7:00 pm		Maine	W 88–75	14–9 (7–3)	Lundholm Gym (365); Durham, NH
02/11/2016; 7:00 pm, ESPN3		Albany	W 69–68	15–9 (8–3)	Lundholm Gym (843); Durham, NH
02/14/2016; 2:00 pm		at Stony Brook	L 58–59	15–10 (8–4)	Island Federal Credit Union Arena (4,109); Stony Brook, NY
02/17/2016; 7:00 pm		UMass Lowell	W 80–69	16–10 (9–4)	Lundholm Gym (882); Durham, NH
02/20/2016; 6:00 pm		at Hartford	W 74–63	17–10 (10–4)	Chase Arena at Reich Family Pavilion (4,475); Hartford, CT
02/24/2016; 7:00 pm		at Vermont	L 67–73	17–11 (10–5)	Patrick Gym (2,242); Burlington, VT
02/27/2016; 12:00 pm		UMBC	W 78–69	18–11 (11–5)	Lundholm Gym (1,281); Durham, NH
America East tournament
03/02/2016; 7:30 pm, ESPN3	(4)	(5) Binghamtom; Quarterfinals	W 56–51	19–11	Lundholm Gym (1,866); Durham, NH
03/07/2016; 7:30 pm, ESPN3	(4)	at (3) Vermont; Semifinals	L 56–63	19–12	Patrick Gym (2,840); Burlington, VT
CIT
03/16/2016*; 7:00 pm		at Fairfield; First round	W 77–62	20–12	Webster Bank Arena (2,500); Bridgeport, CT
03/19/2016*; 2:00 pm		at Coastal Carolina; Second round	L 62–71	20–13	HTC Center (847); Conway, SC
*Non-conference game. ^{#}Rankings from AP Poll. (#) Tournament seedings in parentheses. All times are in Eastern Time.
