= 2015–16 Duquesne Dukes men's basketball team =

American college basketball season

2015–16 Duquesne Dukes men's basketball

CBI, Quarterfinals, L 72–82 vs. Morehead State
- Conference: Atlantic 10 Conference
- Record: 17–17 (6–12 A-10)
- Head coach: Jim Ferry (4th season)
- Assistant coaches: Brian Nash; John Rhodes; Rich Glesmann
- Home arena: A. J. Palumbo Center (Capacity: 4,406)

2015–16 Atlantic 10 men's basketball standings
	Conf.				Overall
Team	W		L	PCT	W		L	PCT
Dayton	14	–	4	.778	25	–	8	.758
VCU	14	–	4	.778	25	–	11	.694
St. Bonaventure	14	–	4	.778	22	–	9	.710
Saint Joseph's †	13	–	5	.722	28	–	8	.778
George Washington	11	–	7	.611	28	–	10	.737
Davidson	10	–	8	.556	20	–	13	.606
Rhode Island	9	–	9	.500	17	–	15	.531
Fordham	8	–	10	.444	17	–	14	.548
Richmond	7	–	11	.389	16	–	16	.500
UMass	6	–	12	.333	14	–	18	.438
Duquesne	6	–	12	.333	17	–	17	.500
George Mason	5	–	13	.278	11	–	21	.344
Saint Louis	5	–	13	.278	11	–	21	.344
La Salle	4	–	14	.222	9	–	22	.290
† 2016 A10 Tournament winner

The 2015–16 Duquesne Dukes men's basketball team represented Duquesne University during the 2015–16 NCAA Division I men's basketball season. The Dukes, led by fourth year head coach Jim Ferry, played their home games at the A. J. Palumbo Center and were members of the Atlantic 10 Conference. They finished the season 17–17, 6–12 in A-10 play to finish in a tie for tenth place. They lost to La Salle in the first round of the A-10 tournament. The Dukes were invited to the College Basketball Invitational where they defeated Nebraska–Omaha in the first round before losing in the quarterfinals to Morehead State.

== Previous season ==
The Dukes finish the 2014–15 season 12–19, 6–12 in A-10 play to finish in eleventh place. They advanced to the second round of the A-10 tournament where they lost to George Washington.

== Departures ==
Name	Number	Pos.	Height	Weight	Year	Hometown	Notes
Dominique McKoy	3	F	6'8"	215	Senior	Atlanta, GA	Graduated
Christian Johnson	14	G	5'10"	150	Junior	Pittsburgh, PA	Walk on; didn't return
Brandon Cartmill	21	G	5'10"	170	Junior	Carlise, PA	Left the team for personal reasons
Desmond Ridenour	32	G	6'2"	185	Sophomore	Cleveland Heights, OH	Transferred to Kent State
Jordan Stevens	35	G	6'0"	190	Junior	Columbia, MO	Graduate transferred to Midwestern State

=== Incoming transfers ===
Name	Number	Pos.	Height	Weight	Year	Hometown	Previous School
Tarin Smith		G	6'2"	175	Sophomore	Asbury Park, NJ	Transferred from Nebraska. Under NCAA transfer rules, Smith will have to sit out for the 2015–16 season. Will have three years of remaining eligibility.

== Incoming recruits ==
College recruiting information
Name	Hometown	School	Height	Weight	Commit date
Nakye Sanders; SF	Staten Island, NY	Tottenville High School	6 ft 7 in (2.01 m)	220 lb (100 kg)	Oct 6, 2014
Nakye Sanders; SF	Recruit ratings: Scout: Rivals: (NR)				
Overall recruit ranking:
Note: In many cases, Scout, Rivals, 247Sports, On3, and ESPN may conflict in their listings of height and weight.; In these cases, the average was taken. ESPN grades are on a 100-point scale.; Sources: "2015 Team Ranking". Rivals.

== Roster ==
2015–16 Duquesne Dukes men's basketball team
Players
Coaches

Pos.	#	Name	Height	Weight	Year	Previous school	Hometown
C	00	Darius Lewis	6 ft 11 in (2.11 m)	245 lb (111 kg)	Jr	IMG Academy	Lexington, KY
G	1	Derrick Colter	5 ft 11 in (1.8 m)	180 lb (82 kg)	Sr	Largo	Forestville, MD
G	2	Eric James	6 ft 5 in (1.96 m)	205 lb (93 kg)	So	Westerville	Westerville, OH
G	4	Rene Castro	6 ft 2 in (1.88 m)	185 lb (84 kg)	RS So	Butler; Worcester Academy	Boston, MA
F	5	TySean Powell	6 ft 6 in (1.98 m)	215 lb (98 kg)	So	IMG Academy	Twinsburg, OH
G	13	Mar'Qywell Jackson	6 ft 5 in (1.96 m)	195 lb (88 kg)	RS Fr	UTEP; East English Valley Prep	Detroit, MI
F	20	Nakye Sanders	6 ft 8 in (2.03 m)	225 lb (102 kg)	Fr	Tottenville	Staten Island, NY
G	21	David Haus	6 ft 2 in (1.88 m)	180 lb (82 kg)	So	North Allegheny	Pittsburgh, PA
G	22	Micah Mason	6 ft 2 in (1.88 m)	180 lb (82 kg)	Sr	Drake; Highlands	Natrona Heights, PA
G	23	Jeremiah Jones	6 ft 3 in (1.91 m)	200 lb (91 kg)	Sr	Merrillville	Gary, IN
G	30	Josh Steel (W)	6 ft 4 in (1.93 m)	190 lb (86 kg)	Fr	Barking Abbey Academy	Harlow, England
F	31	Nick Foschia	6 ft 4 in (1.93 m)	220 lb (100 kg)	Sr	Walsh Jesuit	Northfield Center, OH
F	32	Zach Snyder	6 ft 5 in (1.96 m)	190 lb (86 kg)	Fr	Seneca Valley	Cranberry Township, PA
F	33	L. G. Gill	6 ft 8 in (2.03 m)	220 lb (100 kg)	Jr	Benedictine College Prep	Chesterfield, VA
F	45	Marshall Macheledt	6 ft 9 in (2.06 m)	215 lb (98 kg)	So	Greensboro Day School	Greensboro, NC
F	55	Jordan Robinson	6 ft 8 in (2.03 m)	240 lb (109 kg)	RS So	Quality Education Academy	Toronto, ON
G		Tarin Smith (I) (redshirt)	6 ft 2 in (1.88 m)	175 lb (79 kg)	So	Nebraska; St. Anthony	Ocean Township, NJ

Head coach

- Jim Ferry (Keene State)

Assistant coach(es)

- Brian Nash (Keene State)
- John Rhodes (Ohio)
- Rich Glesmann (Emerson)

Legend

- (C) Team captain
- (S) Suspended
- (I) Ineligible
- (W) Walk-on
- Injured
- Current redshirt

Roster

== Schedule ==
Date time, TV	Rank^{#}	Opponent^{#}	Result	Record	Site (attendance) city, state
Exhibition
11/10/2015*; 7:00 pm		Urbana	W 91–62		Palumbo Center (574); Pittsburgh, PA
Non-conference regular season
11/13/2015*; 7:00 pm		Seton Hill; Gulf Coast Showcase Opening Round	W 96–71	1–0	Palumbo Center (943); Pittsburgh, PA
11/16/2015*; 7:00 pm		New Orleans	W 95–75	2–0	Palumbo Center (1,016); Pittsburgh, PA
11/20/2015*; 7:00 pm		Penn State	W 78–52	3–0	Consol Energy Center (3,520); Pittsburgh, PA
11/23/2015*; 2:30 pm		vs. Pepperdine; Gulf Coast Showcase quarterfinals	L 70–84	3–1	Germain Arena (523); Estero, FL
11/24/2015*; 12:00 pm		vs. Milwaukee; Gulf Coast Showcase consolation round	W 96–92 ^{OT}	4–1	Germain Arena (823); Estero, FL
11/25/2015*; 2:30 pm		vs. WKU; Gulf Coast Showcase 5th place game	W 81–73	5–1	Germain Arena (1,077); Estero, FL
12/01/2015*; 7:00 pm		Mississippi Valley State	W 91–77	6–1	Palumbo Center (1,079); Pittsburgh, PA
12/04/2015*; 7:00 pm, CBSSN		vs. Pittsburgh; City Game	L 75–96	6–2	Consol Energy Center (13,906); Pittsburgh, PA
12/08/2015*; 7:00 pm		UMBC	W 89–70	7–2	Palumbo Center (1,030); Pittsburgh, PA
12/12/2015*; 1:00 pm		vs. Saint Francis (PA)	W 67–65	8–2	Cambria County War Memorial Arena (1,015); Johnstown, PA
12/16/2015*; 7:00 pm		South Carolina State	W 83–68	9–2	Palumbo Center (1,361); Pittsburgh, PA
12/19/2015*; 2:00 pm		Robert Morris	W 72–65	10–2	Palumbo Center (2,119); Pittsburgh, PA
12/29/2015*; 7:00 pm, ESPN3		at Georgia Tech	L 67–73	10–3	Hank McCamish Pavilion (5,417); Atlanta, GA
Atlantic 10 regular season
01/02/2016; 2:30 pm, NBCSN		Dayton	L 58–66	10–4 (0–1)	Palumbo Center (3,323); Pittsburgh, PA
01/06/2016; 7:00 pm		at Davidson	L 66–77	10–5 (0–2)	John M. Belk Arena (3,321); Davidson, NC
01/09/2016; 8:00 pm, ASN		at George Washington	L 64–91	10–6 (0–3)	Charles E. Smith Center (3,103); Washington, D.C.
01/13/2016; 7:00 pm		Saint Louis	W 81–71	11–6 (1–3)	Palumbo Center (1,506); Pittsburgh, PA
01/16/2016; 6:00 pm, ASN		St. Bonaventure	W 95–88	12–6 (2–3)	Palumbo Center (2,425); Pittsburgh, PA
01/20/2016; 7:00 pm, MASN		at VCU	L 71–93	12–7 (2–4)	Siegel Center (7,637); Richmond, VA
01/22/2016; 2:00 pm		at George Mason	W 86–76	13–7 (3–4)	EagleBank Arena (2,626); Fairfax, VA
01/26/2016; 7:00 pm, ASN		La Salle	W 87–60	14–7 (4–4)	Palumbo Center; Pittsburgh, PA
01/30/2016; 6:00 pm, ASN		at Saint Louis	W 78–67	15–7 (5–4)	Chaifetz Arena (8,412); St. Louis, MO
02/06/2016; 12:30 pm, NBCSN		Davidson	L 82–93	15–8 (5–5)	Palumbo Center (3,382); Pittsburgh, PA
02/09/2016; 7:00 pm, ASN		at No. 19 Dayton	L 74–76	15–9 (5–6)	UD Arena (13,141); Dayton, OH
02/14/2016; 3:00 pm, ASN		Massachusetts	L 99–108 ^{OT}	15–10 (5–7)	Palumbo Center (2,364); Pittsburgh, PA
02/17/2016; 7:00 pm		George Washington	L 74–81	15–11 (5–8)	Palumbo Center (1,520); Pittsburgh, PA
02/20/2016; 7:00 pm		at Rhode Island	L 74–77	15–12 (5–9)	Ryan Center (5,112); Kingston, RI
02/24/2016; 7:00 pm		at St. Bonaventure	L 76–80	15–13 (5–10)	Reilly Center (4,101); Olean, NY
02/27/2016; 6:00 pm, ASN		Richmond	L 67–83	15–14 (5–11)	Palumbo Center (1,916); Pittsburgh, PA
03/02/2016; 7:00 pm		Fordham	L 69–78	15–15 (5–12)	Palumbo Center (1,283); Pittsburgh, PA
03/05/2016; 4:00 pm		at Saint Joseph's	W 78–70	16–15 (6–12)	Hagan Arena (4,200); Philadelphia, PA
Atlantic 10 tournament
03/09/2016; 9:00 pm, ASN	(11)	vs. (14) LaSalle; First round	L 73–88	16–16	Barclays Center (5,523); Brooklyn, NY
CBI
03/16/2016*; 7:00 pm		Nebraska–Omaha; First round	W 120–112	17–16	Palumbo Center (609); Pittsburgh, PA
03/21/2016*; 7:00 pm		at Morehead State; Quarterfinals	L 72–82	17–17	Ellis Johnson Arena (1,387); Morehead, KY
*Non-conference game. ^{#}Rankings from AP Poll. (#) Tournament seedings in parentheses. All times are in Eastern Time.

== See also ==
- 2015–16 Duquesne Dukes women's basketball team
