= 2015–16 Maine Black Bears men's basketball team =

American college basketball season

2015–16 Maine Black Bears men's basketball
- Conference: America East Conference
- Record: 8–22 (4–12 America East)
- Head coach: Bob Walsh (2nd season)
- Assistant coaches: Matt O'Brien; Zak Boisvert; Antone Gray
- Home arena: Cross Insurance Center

2015–16 America East Conference men's basketball standings
	Conf.				Overall
Team	W		L	PCT	W		L	PCT
Stony Brook †	14	–	2	.875	26	–	7	.788
Albany	13	–	3	.813	24	–	9	.727
Vermont	11	–	5	.688	23	–	14	.622
New Hampshire	11	–	5	.688	20	–	13	.606
UMass Lowell*	7	–	9	.438	11	–	18	.379
Binghamton	5	–	11	.313	8	–	22	.267
Hartford	4	–	12	.250	10	–	23	.303
Maine	4	–	12	.250	8	–	22	.267
UMBC	3	–	13	.188	7	–	25	.219
† 2016 America East tournament winner * Ineligible for postseason during transition to Division I.

The 2015–16 Maine Black Bears men's basketball team represented the University of Maine during the 2015–16 NCAA Division I men's basketball season. The Black Bears, were led by second year head coach Bob Walsh, played their home games at Cross Insurance Center and were members of the America East Conference. Maine finished the season with an 8–22 overall record and 4–12 in conference. They finished in a tie for seventh place in conference and lost in the quarterfinals of the America East tournament to Vermont.

== Previous season ==
The Black Bears finished the season 3–27, 2–14 in America East play to finish in a tie for eighth place. They lost in the quarterfinals of the America East tournament to Albany.

== Departures ==
Name	Number	Pos.	Height	Weight	Year	Hometown	Notes
Christian Ejiga	3	F	6'8"	225	Sophomore	Lagos, Nigeria	Transferred to Caldwell
Erik Nissen	11	F	6'9"	215	Sophomore	Quispamsis, NB	Transferred to Acadia
Stefan Micovic	13	F	6'9"	210	Junior	Pondov, Serbia	Retired from basketball due to health conditions
Ethan Mackay	33	F	6'7"	220	RS Junior	Voorheesville, NY	Graduate transferred to Armstrong State
Peter Westra	54	G	6'5"	180	Senior	New Gloucester, ME	Graduated

=== Incoming transfers ===
Name	Number	Pos.	Height	Weight	Year	Hometown	Previous School
Wesley Myers		G	6'2"	180	Junior	Brooklyn, NY	Transferred from Niagara. Under NCAA transfer rules, Meyers will have to sit out for the 2015–16 season. Will have two years of remaining eligibility.

== 2015 incoming recruits ==
College recruiting information
Name	Hometown	School	Height	Weight	Commit date
Isaac Vann; SF	Stratford, CT	Coastal Academy	6 ft 5 in (1.96 m)	170 lb (77 kg)	Mar 10, 2015
Isaac Vann; SF	Recruit ratings: Scout: Rivals: (61)				
Vincent Eze #90 PF	Easton, PA	Putnam Science Academy	6 ft 8 in (2.03 m)	N/A	May 17, 2015
Vincent Eze #90 PF	Recruit ratings: Scout: Rivals: (61)				
Devine Eke; PF	Plainfield, NJ	The Robinson School	6 ft 7 in (2.01 m)	195 lb (88 kg)	Nov 10, 2014
Devine Eke; PF	Recruit ratings: Scout: Rivals: (60)				
Lavar Harewood; SG	Brooklyn, NY	Brooks School	6 ft 3 in (1.91 m)	N/A	Oct 22, 2014
Lavar Harewood; SG	Recruit ratings: Scout: Rivals: (NR)				
Overall recruit ranking:
Note: In many cases, Scout, Rivals, 247Sports, On3, and ESPN may conflict in their listings of height and weight.; In these cases, the average was taken. ESPN grades are on a 100-point scale.; Sources: "2015 Team Ranking". Rivals.

== Roster ==
2015–16 Maine Black Bears men's basketball team
Players
Coaches

Pos.	#	Name	Height	Weight	Year	Previous school	Hometown
G	0	Lavar Harewood	6 ft 3 in (1.91 m)	200 lb (91 kg)	Fr	Brooks HS	Brooklyn, NY
G	1	Aaron Calixte	5 ft 11 in (1.8 m)	175 lb (79 kg)	So	Stoughton HS/Lee Academy	Stoughton, MA
G	2	Kevin Litte	6 ft 0 in (1.83 m)	160 lb (73 kg)	So	Our Savior New American/Coastal Academy	Wyandanch, NY
G	3	Ryan Bernstein (W)	6 ft 0 in (1.83 m)	175 lb (79 kg)	Fr	Archbishop Stepinac HS	Bronx, NY
F	4	Marko Pirovic	6 ft 7 in (2.01 m)	205 lb (93 kg)	Jr	Robert F. Hall Secondary School	Bolton, ON
F	5	Devine Eke	6 ft 7 in (2.01 m)	195 lb (88 kg)	Fr	Union Catholic Regional HS	Plainfield, NJ
G	10	Shaun Lawton	6 ft 5 in (1.96 m)	190 lb (86 kg)	Sr	Putnam Science Academy/Long Island Lutheran	Harlem, NY
F	11	Ilija Stojiljkovic	6 ft 7 in (2.01 m)	210 lb (95 kg)	Fr	Pravno-Poslovna skola Nis	Niš, Serbia
G	11	Walter King (W)	6 ft 0 in (1.83 m)	195 lb (88 kg)	Fr	Archbishop Stepinac HS	Peekskill, NY
G	22	Garvey Melmed (W)	6 ft 1 in (1.85 m)	175 lb (79 kg)	So	Old Town HS	Greenbush, ME
F	23	Issac Vann	6 ft 6 in (1.98 m)	190 lb (86 kg)	Fr	Bunnell HS	Bridgeport, CT
F	25	Till Gloger	6 ft 8 in (2.03 m)	220 lb (100 kg)	Fr	Paderborn Baskets	Bochum, Germany
G	31	Troy Reid-Knight	6 ft 0 in (1.83 m)	190 lb (86 kg)	Jr	Vaughan Secondary/Thornlea Secondary	Vaughan, ON
G	32	Dennis Ashley (W)	6 ft 1 in (1.85 m)	165 lb (75 kg)	Fr	St. Monica	Los Angeles, CA
F/C	50	Vincent Eze	6 ft 8 in (2.03 m)	202 lb (92 kg)	Fr	Notre Dame HS	Putnam, CT
G/F	55	Garet Beal	6 ft 6 in (1.98 m)	215 lb (98 kg)	Jr	Jonesport-Beals HS	Beals, ME
G		Wesley Myers (I) (redshirt)	6 ft 2 in (1.88 m)	186 lb (84 kg)	Jr	Boys and Girls HS; Niagara	Brooklyn, NY

Head coach

- Bob Walsh (Iona)

Assistant coach(es)

- Matt O'Brien (Maine)
- Zak Boisvert (Fordham)
- Antone Gray (Rhode Island College)

Legend

- (C) Team captain
- (S) Suspended
- (I) Ineligible
- (W) Walk-on
- Injured
- Current redshirt

Roster

== Schedule ==
Date time, TV	Rank^{#}	Opponent^{#}	Result	Record	Site (attendance) city, state
Exhibition
10/31/2015*; 7:00 pm		at Southern Maine	W 104–58		Warren G. Hill Gymnasium (393); Portland, ME
11/07/2015*; 2:00 pm		Husson	W 93–79		Cross Insurance Center; Bangor, ME
Non-conference regular season
11/13/2015*; 7:00 pm, SNY		at No. 20 UConn	L 56–100	0–1	Gampel Pavilion (10,167); Storrs, CT
11/19/2015*; 7:00 pm		at LIU Brooklyn	L 79–84	0–2	Steinberg Wellness Center (1,435); Brooklyn, NY
11/21/2015*; 2:00 pm		at Wagner	L 73–87	0–3	Spiro Sports Center (1,257); Staten Island, NY
11/25/2015*; 2:30 pm		Longwood	W 92–82	1–3	Cross Insurance Center (2,631); Bangor, ME
11/29/2015*; 4:00 pm		at Central Connecticut	W 81–74	2–3	William H. Detrick Gymnasium (776); New Britain, CT
12/02/2015*; 7:00 pm		Army	L 71–84	2–4	Cross Insurance Center (1,192); Bangor, ME
12/02/2015*; 2:30 pm, FSN		at Marquette	L 67–104	2–5	BMO Harris Bradley Center (12,304); Milwaukee, WI
12/09/2015*; 7:00 pm		Dartmouth	L 69–79	2–6	Cross Insurance Center (940); Bangor, ME
12/13/2015*; 5:00 pm, ESPN3		at Boston College	L 60–91	2–7	Conte Forum (1,411); Chestnut Hill, MA
12/19/2015*; 2:00 pm		at Fordham	L 53–70	2–8	Rose Hill Gymnasium (2,032); Bronx, NY
12/21/2015*; 7:05 pm		at Holy Cross	L 75–76	2–9	Hart Center (1,014); Worcester, MA
12/29/2015*; 7:00 pm		Quinnipiac	W 98–95 ^{OT}	3–9	Cross Insurance Center (1,076); Bangor, ME
01/02/2016*; 2:00 pm		Brown	W 98–92	4–9	Cross Insurance Center; Bangor, ME
America East regular season
01/06/2016; 7:00 pm		at Vermont	L 72–90	4–10 (0–1)	Cross Insurance Center (1,024); Bangor, ME
01/09/2016; 7:00 pm		at UMBC	L 76–89	4–11 (0–2)	Retriever Activities Center (751); Catonsville, MD
01/13/2016; 11:00 am		at UMass Lowell	W 95–81	5–11 (1–2)	Costello Athletic Center (443); Lowell, MA
01/15/2016; 12:00 pm		Albany	W 81–79	6–11 (2–2)	Cross Insurance Center (1,406); Bangor, ME
01/18/2016; 7:00 pm		New Hampshire	L 91–99	6–12 (2–3)	Cross Insurance Center (1,783); Bangor, ME
01/24/2016; 2:00 pm		at Stony Brook	L 54–81	6–13 (2–4)	Island Federal Credit Union Arena (2,940); Stony Brook, NY
01/27/2016; 7:00 pm		at Hartford	W 105–100 ^{OT}	7–13 (3–4)	Chase Arena at Reich Family Pavilion; Hartford, CT
01/30/2016; 2:00 pm		Binghamton	W 74–63	8–13 (4–4)	Cross Insurance Center; Bangor, ME
02/03/2016; 7:00 pm		at Vermont	L 68–85	8–14 (4–5)	Patrick Gym (1,946); Burlington, VT
02/06/2016; 12:00 pm		UMBC	L 79–83	8–15 (4–6)	Portland Exposition Building (1,342); Portland, ME
02/08/2016; 7:00 pm		at New Hampshire	L 75–88	8–16 (4–7)	Lundholm Gym (365); Durham, NH
02/11/2016; 4:00 pm		UMass Lowell	L 95–108	8–17 (4–8)	Cross Insurance Center (1,523); Bangor, ME
02/14/2016; 2:00 pm		at Albany	L 64–108	8–18 (4–9)	SEFCU Arena (2,716); Albany, NY
02/21/2016; 2:00 pm		Stony Brook	L 56–75	8–19 (4–10)	Cross Insurance Center (1,285); Bangor, ME
02/24/2016; 7:00 pm		Hartford	L 74–82	8–20 (4–11)	Cross Insurance Center (1,145); Bangor, ME
02/27/2016; 2:00 pm		at Binghamton	L 66–78	8–21 (4–12)	Binghamton University Events Center (2,426); Vestal, NY
America East tournament
03/02/16; 7:30 pm, ESPN3	(6)	at (3) Vermont; Quarterfinals	L 82–99	8–22	Patrick Gym (2,165); Burlington, VT
*Non-conference game. ^{#}Rankings from AP Poll. (#) Tournament seedings in parentheses. All times are in Eastern Time.
