= 2015–16 Hartford Hawks men's basketball team =

American college basketball season

2015–16 Hartford Hawks men's basketball
- Conference: America East Conference
- Record: 10–23 (4–12 America East)
- Head coach: John Gallagher (6th season)
- Assistant coaches: Tom Devitt; Jaret von Rosenberg
- Home arena: Chase Arena at Reich Family Pavilion

2015–16 America East Conference men's basketball standings
	Conf.				Overall
Team	W		L	PCT	W		L	PCT
Stony Brook †	14	–	2	.875	26	–	7	.788
Albany	13	–	3	.813	24	–	9	.727
Vermont	11	–	5	.688	23	–	14	.622
New Hampshire	11	–	5	.688	20	–	13	.606
UMass Lowell*	7	–	9	.438	11	–	18	.379
Binghamton	5	–	11	.313	8	–	22	.267
Hartford	4	–	12	.250	10	–	23	.303
Maine	4	–	12	.250	8	–	22	.267
UMBC	3	–	13	.188	7	–	25	.219
† 2016 America East tournament winner * Ineligible for postseason during transition to Division I.

The 2015–16 Hartford Hawks men's basketball team represented the University of Hartford during the 2015–16 NCAA Division I men's basketball season. The Hawks, led by sixth year head coach John Gallagher, played their home games at the Chase Arena at Reich Family Pavilion and were members of the America East Conference. They finished the season 10–23, 4–12 in America East play to finish in a tie for seventh place. They defeated Albany in the quarterfinals of the American East tournament to advance to the semifinals where they lost to Stony Brook.

== Roster ==
Number	Name	Position	Height	Weight	Year	Hometown
0	TreVaughn Wilkerson	Forward	6–7		Freshman	Philadelphia, Pennsylvania
1	Jason Dunne	Guard	6–3		Freshman	Matawan, New Jersey
2	Justin Graham	Guard	6–1	175	Junior	San Antonio, Texas
3	Jalen Ross	Guard	5–11	175	Senior	Greensboro, North Carolina
4	George Blagojevic	Forward	6–8		Freshman	Geelong, Victoria Australia
5	Cleveland Thomas	Guard	6–3	195	Senior	Baton Rouge, Louisiana
10	John Carroll	Forward	6–8	220	Sophomore	Dublin, Ireland
11	Taylor Dyson	Guard	6–4	185	Senior	Sassafras, Victoria, Australia
12	Jake Fay	Guard	6–6	195	Junior	Lynn, Massachusetts
13	J.R. Lynch	Guard	5–10		Freshman	Hoboken, New Jersey
14	Dougal Weir	Center	6–9	240	Junior	Sydney, Australia
20	Max Twyman	Guard	6–5	200	Sophomore	Rye, New York
21	Jack Hobbs	Forward	6–7	190	Sophomore	Anchorage, Alaska
33	Mark Plousis	Guard/Forward	6–5	180	Sophomore	Springfield, Pennsylvania
34	Evan Cooper	Guard	6–0	180	Junior	Houston, Texas

== Schedule ==
Date time, TV	Rank^{#}	Opponent^{#}	Result	Record	Site (attendance) city, state
Exhibition
11/06/2015*; 7:00 pm		Bowie State	L 63–66		Chase Arena at Reich Family Pavilion (736); Hartford, CT
Non-conference regular season
11/13/2015*; 8:00 pm		at Central Connecticut; Connecticut 6 Classic; Rivalry	W 92–83 ^{2OT}	1–0	William H. Detrick Gymnasium; New Britain, CT
11/15/2015*; 5:00 pm		at Saint Louis; Brooklyn Hoops Holiday Invitational	L 68–85	1–1	Chaifetz Arena (6,068); St. Louis, MO
11/17/2015*; 7:00 pm, ESPN3		at Louisville; Brooklyn Hoops Holiday Invitational	L 52–87	1–2	KFC Yum! Center (18,910); Louisville, KY
11/19/2015*; 7:00 pm		at Saint Peter's	W 67–66	2–2	Yanitelli Center (652); Jersey City, NJ
11/24/2015*; 7:00 pm		Niagara	W 77–73	3–2	Chase Arena at Reich Family Pavilion (772); Hartford, CT
11/27/2015*; 7:00 pm		North Florida; Brooklyn Hoops Holiday Invitational	L 60–81	3–3	Chase Arena at Reich Family Pavilion (539); Hartford, CT
11/29/2015*; 4:00 pm		St. Francis Brooklyn; Brooklyn Hoops Holiday Invitational	L 67–74	3–4	Chase Arena at Reich Family Pavilion (507); Hartford, CT
12/02/2015*; 7:00 pm, FSN		at No. 23 Providence	L 66–89	3–5	Dunkin' Donuts Center (5,169); Providence, RI
12/05/2015*; 2:00 pm		at Dartmouth	L 65–74	3–6	Leede Arena (689); Hanover, NH
12/09/2015*; 7:00 pm		Quinnipiac	L 66–68	3–7	Chase Arena at Reich Family Pavilion (1,014); Hartford, CT
12/12/2015*; 7:00 pm		Holy Cross	L 68–90	3–8	Chase Arena at Reich Family Pavilion (1,072); Hartford, CT
12/14/2015*; 8:30 pm		Sacred Heart	W 80–71	4–8	Chase Arena at Reich Family Pavilion (1,822); Hartford, CT
12/22/2015*; 2:00 pm		Widener	W 69–46	5–8	Chase Arena at Reich Family Pavilion (2,308); Hartford, CT
12/30/2015*; 7:00 pm		at Rider	L 80–82 ^{2OT}	5–9	Alumni Gymnasium (1,520); Lawrenceville, NJ
01/02/2016*; 7:00 pm		Yale	L 53–88	5–10	Chase Arena at Reich Family Pavilion (1,133); Hartford, CT
America East regular season
01/06/2016; 7:00 pm		at UMass Lowell	L 76–80	5–11 (0–1)	Costello Athletic Center (341); Lowell, MA
01/13/2016; 7:00 pm		at Binghamton	W 76–72	6–11 (1–1)	Binghamton University Events Center (1,663); Vestal, NY
01/16/2016; 7:00 pm		Vermont	L 68–83	6–12 (1–2)	Chase Arena at Reich Family Pavilion (1,103); Hartford, CT
01/18/2016; 1:00 pm		Stony Brook	L 43–77	6–13 (1–3)	Chase Arena at Reich Family Pavilion (1,352); Hartford, CT
01/21/2016; 7:00 pm		at UMBC	W 98–87	7–13 (2–3)	Retriever Activities Center (697); Catonsville, MD
01/24/2016; 1:00 pm		at New Hampshire	L 71–84	7–14 (2–4)	Lundholm Gym; Durham, NH
01/27/2016; 7:00 pm		Maine	L 100–105 ^{OT}	7–15 (2–5)	Chase Arena at Reich Family Pavilion (1,141); Hartford, CT
01/30/2016; 7:00 pm		Albany	L 60–86	7–16 (2–6)	Chase Arena at Reich Family Pavilion (2,341); Hartford, CT
02/03/2016; 7:00 pm, ESPN3		UMass Lowell	L 83–85	7–17 (2–7)	Chase Arena at Reich Family Pavilion (1,752); Hartford, CT
02/08/2016; 7:00 pm		at Stony Brook	L 72–85	20–4 (11–0)	Island Federal Credit Union Arena (3,001); Stony Brook, NY
02/11/2016; 7:00 pm		Binghamton	L 54–68	7–19 (2–9)	Chase Arena at Reich Family Pavilion (1,330); Hartford, CT
02/14/2016; 2:00 pm		at Vermont	L 81–92	7–20 (2–10)	Patrick Gym (2,475); Burlington, VT
02/17/2016; 7:00 pm		UMBC	W 88–65	8–20 (3–10)	Chase Arena at Reich Family Pavilion (1,154); Hartford, CT
02/20/2016; 7:00 pm		New Hampshire	L 63–74	8–21 (3–11)	Chase Arena at Reich Family Pavilion (4,475); Hartford, CT
02/24/2016; 7:00 pm		at Maine	W 82–74	9–21 (4–11)	Cross Insurance Center (1,145); Bangor, ME
02/27/2016; 7:00 pm, ESPN3		at Albany	L 59–75	9–22 (4–12)	SEFCU Arena (4,408); Albany, NY
America East tournament
03/02/2016; 7:00 pm, ESPN3	(7)	at (2) Albany; Quarterfinals	W 68–59	10–22	SEFCU Arena (2,535); Albany, NY
03/07/16; 7:00 pm, ESPN3	(7)	at (1) Stony Brook; Semifinals	L 64–80	10–23	Island Federal Credit Union Arena (4,109); Stony Brook, NY
*Non-conference game. ^{#}Rankings from AP Poll. (#) Tournament seedings in parentheses. All times are in Eastern Time.
