= 2015–16 UMBC Retrievers men's basketball team =

American college basketball season

2015–16 UMBC Retrievers men's basketball
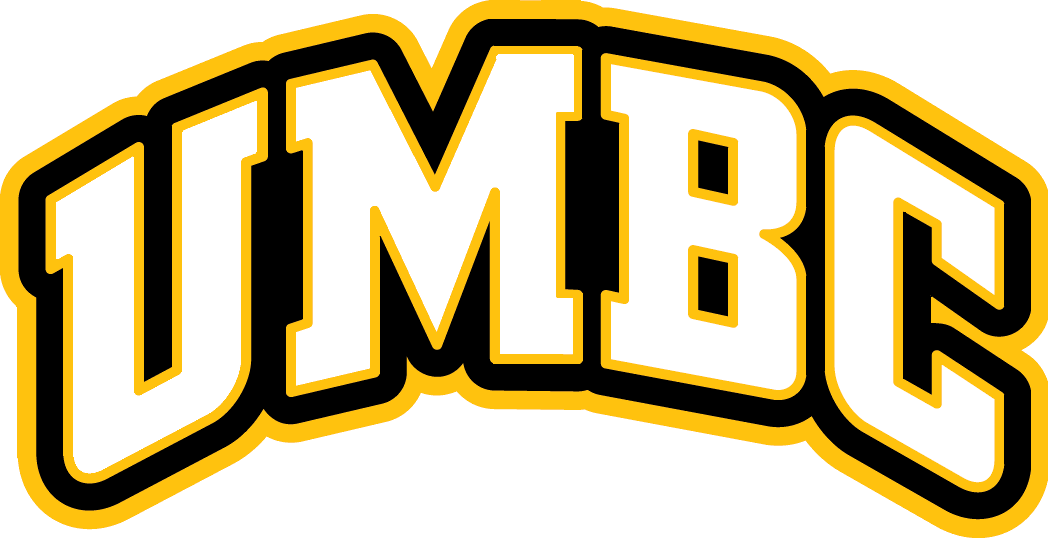
- Conference: America East Conference
- Record: 7–25 (3–13 America East)
- Head coach: Aki Thomas (4th season)
- Assistant coaches: John Zito; Frankie Allen; Brian Johnson
- Home arena: Retriever Activities Center

2015–16 America East Conference men's basketball standings
	Conf.				Overall
Team	W		L	PCT	W		L	PCT
Stony Brook †	14	–	2	.875	26	–	7	.788
Albany	13	–	3	.813	24	–	9	.727
Vermont	11	–	5	.688	23	–	14	.622
New Hampshire	11	–	5	.688	20	–	13	.606
UMass Lowell*	7	–	9	.438	11	–	18	.379
Binghamton	5	–	11	.313	8	–	22	.267
Hartford	4	–	12	.250	10	–	23	.303
Maine	4	–	12	.250	8	–	22	.267
UMBC	3	–	13	.188	7	–	25	.219
† 2016 America East tournament winner * Ineligible for postseason during transition to Division I.

The 2015–16 UMBC Retrievers men's basketball team represented the University of Maryland, Baltimore County during the 2015–16 NCAA Division I men's basketball season. The Retrievers, led by fourth-year head coach Aki Thomas, played their home games at the Retriever Activities Center and were members of the America East Conference. They finished the season 7–25, 3–13 in America East play to finish in last place. They lost in the first round of the America East tournament to Stony Brook.

On March 3, head coach Aki Thomas was fired. He finished at UMBC with a four-year record of 28–95.

== Previous season ==
The Retrievers finished the season 4–26, 2–14 in America East play to finish in a tie for eighth place. They lost in the quarterfinals of the America East tournament to Vermont.

== Departures ==
Name	Number	Pos.	Height	Weight	Year	Hometown	Notes
Aaron Morgan	0	G	5'11"	185	Junior	Washington, PA	Transferred
Wayne Sparow	4	G	6'3"	195	GS Senior	Baltimore, MD	Graduated
Charles Taylor, Jr.	11	G/F	6'4"	185	Sophomore	Silver Spring, MD	Transferred to Jackson State
Devarick Houston	23	F	6'7"	195	Senior	Jonesboro, GA	Graduated
Malik Garner	33	F	6'6"	225	Junior	Philadelphia, PA	Graduate transferred to Bloomsburg
Lamell Washington	40	F	6'6"	205	Freshman	Frederick, MD	Transferred to Seton Hill

== 2015 incoming recruits ==
College recruiting
Name	Hometown	School	Height	Weight	Commit date
Daquon Ervin #95 PG	Brooklyn, NY	Northfield-Mt. Hermon School	6 ft 0 in (1.83 m)	N/A	Mar 21, 2015
Daquon Ervin #95 PG	Recruit ratings: Scout: Rivals: (62)				
Joel Wincowski #149 PG	Lake George, NY	Lake George High School	6 ft 2 in (1.88 m)	175 lb (79 kg)	Sep 15, 2014
Joel Wincowski #149 PG	Recruit ratings: Scout: Rivals: (56)				
Nolan Gerrity; PF	Berea, OH	Berea-Midpark High School	6 ft 10 in (2.08 m)	225 lb (102 kg)	Nov 16, 2014
Nolan Gerrity; PF	Recruit ratings: Scout: Rivals: (NR)				
Samson Schwietz; PF	Frisco, TX	Johnson Ferry Christian Academy	6 ft 8 in (2.03 m)	N/A	Nov 17, 2014
Samson Schwietz; PF	Recruit ratings: Scout: Rivals: (NR)				
Joe Sherburne; SF	Whitefish Bay, WI	Brewster Academy	6 ft 6 in (1.98 m)	205 lb (93 kg)	Mar 11, 2015
Joe Sherburne; SF	Recruit ratings: Scout: Rivals: (NR)				
Overall recruit ranking:
Note: In many cases, Scout, Rivals, 247Sports, On3, and ESPN may conflict in their listings of height and weight.; In these cases, the average was taken. ESPN grades are on a 100-point scale.; Sources: "2015 Team Ranking". Rivals.

== Roster ==
2015–16 UMBC Retrievers men's basketball team
Players
Coaches

Pos.	#	Name	Height	Weight	Year	Previous school	Hometown
G	0	Daquon Ervin	6 ft 0 in (1.83 m)	185 lb (84 kg)	Fr	Northfield Mount Hermon	Brooklyn, NY
G	1	Rodney Elliott	6 ft 0 in (1.83 m)	190 lb (86 kg)	RS So	John Carroll	Baltimore, MD
G	2	Malcolm L. Brent	6 ft 5 in (1.96 m)	190 lb (86 kg)	So	Kimball Union Academy	Silver Spring, MD
G	3	Ben Grace (W)	5 ft 10 in (1.78 m)	185 lb (84 kg)	Jr	The Gilman School	Baltimore, MD
G	4	Joel Wincowski	6 ft 2 in (1.88 m)	200 lb (91 kg)	Fr	Lake George	Lake George, NY
G	5	Jourdan Grant	6 ft 2 in (1.88 m)	185 lb (84 kg)	So	Archbishop Spalding	Bowie, MD
G	10	Jairus Lyles	6 ft 2 in (1.88 m)	175 lb (79 kg)	RS So	DeMatha	Silver Spring, MD
G	12	Will Darley	6 ft 8 in (2.03 m)	205 lb (93 kg)	Jr	Dulaney/Fishburne Academy	Timonium, MD
G	13	Joe Sherburne	6 ft 6 in (1.98 m)	210 lb (95 kg)	Fr	Whitefish Bay	Whitefish Bay, WI
G	15	Ishmail Jabbie (W)	6 ft 3 in (1.91 m)	170 lb (77 kg)	Fr	Eleanor Roosevelt	Bowie, MD
F/C	21	Sam Schwietz	6 ft 9 in (2.06 m)	235 lb (107 kg)	Fr	Johnson Ferry Christian Acad.	Frisco, TX
F/C	23	Nolan Gerrity	6 ft 10 in (2.08 m)	225 lb (102 kg)	Fr	Barea-Midpark	Cleveland, OH
F	41	Jakob Stenhede	6 ft 10 in (2.08 m)	205 lb (93 kg)	So	Lerums Gymnasium	Gothenburg, Sweden
F	42	Cody Joyce	6 ft 8 in (2.03 m)	235 lb (107 kg)	Sr	Southern	Churchton, MD

Head coach

- Ryan Odom (Howard)

Assistant coach(es)

- John Zito (UMBC)
- Frankie Allen (Roanoke)
- Brian Johnson (Delaware)

Legend

- (C) Team captain
- (S) Suspended
- (I) Ineligible
- (W) Walk-on
- Injured
- Current redshirt

Roster

== Schedule ==
Date time, TV	Rank^{#}	Opponent^{#}	Result	Record	Site (attendance) city, state
Exhibition
11/06/2015*; 7:00 pm		Frostburg State	W 92–76		Retriever Activities Center; Catonsville, MD
Non-conference regular season
11/13/2015*; 8:00 pm, ESPN3		at Wake Forest; Maui Invitational tournament	L 73–78	0–1	LJVM Coliseum (6,904); Winston-Salem, NC
11/16/2015*; 7:00 pm, FS1		at St. John's; Maui Invitational Tournament	L 53–75	0–2	Carnesecca Arena (4,098); Queens, NY
11/19/2015*; 7:00 pm		Loyola (MD)	L 57–76	0–3	Retriever Activities Center (1,020); Catonsville, MD
11/21/2015*; 7:00 pm		at Northern Colorado; Maui Invitational Tournament Mainland	W 81–72	1–3	Bank of Colorado Arena (1,121); Greeley, CO
11/22/2015*; 12:00 pm		vs. Cal Poly; Maui Invitational Tournament Mainland	L 65–78	1–4	Bank of Colorado Arena (475); Greeley, CO
11/25/2015*; 7:00 pm		Navy	L 54–75	1–5	Retriever Activities Center (941); Catonsville, MD
11/28/2015*; 1:00 pm		Colgate	L 63–71	1–6	Retriever Activities Center (590); Catonsville, MD
12/02/2015*; 8:00 pm, ESPN3		at Bowling Green	L 64–72	1–7	Stroh Center (2,019); Bowling Green, OH
12/05/2015*; 5:00 pm, AmericaEast.tv		at Longwood	W 70–59	2–7	Willett Hall (1,748); Farmville, VA
12/08/2015*; 7:00 pm		at Duquesne	L 70–89	2–8	Palumbo Center (1,030); Pittsburgh, PA
12/12/2015*; 1:00 pm, AmericaEast.tv		Mount St. Mary's	W 75–63	3–8	Retriever Activities Center (826); Catonsville, MD
12/19/2015*; 7:00 pm		at Howard	L 93–103	3–9	Burr Gymnasium (344); Washington, D.C.
12/23/2015*; 2:00 pm		at Towson	L 65–91	3–10	SECU Arena (1,224); Towson, MD
12/31/2015*; 1:00 pm, AmericaEast.tv		Maryland Eastern Shore	W 89–75	4–10	Retriever Activities Center (1,231); Catonsville, MD
01/02/2016*; 4:00 pm		at NJIT	L 83–86	4–11	Fleisher Center (510); Newark, NJ
America East regular season
01/06/2016; 7:00 pm		at Albany	L 59–73	4–12 (0–1)	SEFCU Arena (3,415); Albany, NY
01/09/2016; 1:05 pm, AmericaEast.tv		Maine	W 89–76	5–12 (1–1)	Retriever Activities Center (751); Catonsville, MD
01/13/2016; 7:05 pm, AmericaEast.tv		at Stony Brook	L 74–86	5–13 (1–2)	Island Federal Credit Union Arena (2,381); Stony Brook, NY
01/16/2016; 12:00 pm, AmericaEast.tv		UMass Lowell	L 89–95	5–14 (1–3)	Retriever Activities Center (916); Catonsville, MD
01/21/2016; 7:00 pm, AmericaEast.tv		Hartford	L 87–98	5–15 (1–4)	Retriever Activities Center (697); Catonsville, MD
01/24/2016; 1:00 pm, AmericaEast.tv		at Vermont	L 72–79	5–16 (1–5)	Patrick Gym (1,925); Burlington, VT
01/27/2016; 7:00 pm, AmericaEast.tv		at Binghamton	L 57–66	5–17 (1–6)	Binghamton University Events Center (2,013); Vestal, NY
01/30/2016; 1:00 pm, AmericaEast.tv		New Hampshire	L 81–84	5–18 (1–7)	Retriever Activities Center (1,007); Catonsville, MD
02/03/2016; 7:00 pm, AmericaEast.tv		Albany	L 73–79	5–19 (1–8)	Retriever Activities Center (1,068); Catonsville, MD
02/06/2016; 12:00 pm		at Maine	W 83–79	6–19 (2–8)	Portland Exposition Building (1,342); Portland, ME
02/11/2016; 7:00 pm, AmericaEast.tv		Stony Brook	L 52–75	21–4 (12–0)	Retriever Activities Center (1,247); Catonsville, MD
02/14/2016; 12:00 pm, AmericaEast.tv		at UMass Lowell	L 92–96	6–21 (2–10)	Costello Athletic Center (491); Lowell, MA
02/17/2016; 7:00 pm		at Hartford	L 65–88	6–22 (2–11)	Chase Arena at Reich Family Pavilion (1,154); Hartford, CT
02/20/2016; 7:00 pm, AmericaEast.tv		Vermont	L 54–99	6–23 (2–12)	Retriever Activities Center (1,389); Catonsville, MD
02/24/2016; 7:00 pm, AmericaEast.tv		Binghamton	W 80–79 ^{OT}	7–23 (3–12)	Retriever Activities Center (938); Catonsville, MD
02/27/2016; 1:00 pm		at New Hampshire	L 69–78 ^{7–24}	3–13	Lundholm Gym (1,281); Durham, NH
America East tournament
03/02/2016; 7:00 pm, ESPN3	(8)	at (1) Stony Brook; Quarterfinals	L 76–86	7–25	Island Federal Credit Union Arena (3,657); Stony Brook, NY
*Non-conference game. ^{#}Rankings from AP Poll. (#) Tournament seedings in parentheses. All times are in Eastern Time.
