= 2015–16 Albany Great Danes men's basketball team =

American college basketball season

2015–16 Albany Great Danes men's basketball

CBI, First round
- Conference: America East Conference
- Record: 24–9 (13–3 America East)
- Head coach: Will Brown (15th season)
- Assistant coaches: Chad O'Donnell; Jon Iati; Josh Pelletier
- Home arena: SEFCU Arena

2015–16 America East Conference men's basketball standings
	Conf.				Overall
Team	W		L	PCT	W		L	PCT
Stony Brook †	14	–	2	.875	26	–	7	.788
Albany	13	–	3	.813	24	–	9	.727
Vermont	11	–	5	.688	23	–	14	.622
New Hampshire	11	–	5	.688	20	–	13	.606
UMass Lowell*	7	–	9	.438	11	–	18	.379
Binghamton	5	–	11	.313	8	–	22	.267
Hartford	4	–	12	.250	10	–	23	.303
Maine	4	–	12	.250	8	–	22	.267
UMBC	3	–	13	.188	7	–	25	.219
† 2016 America East tournament winner * Ineligible for postseason during transition to Division I.

The 2015–16 Albany Great Danes men's basketball team represented the University at Albany, SUNY during the 2015–16 NCAA Division I men's basketball season. The Great Danes, led by 15th year head coach Will Brown, played their home games at SEFCU Arena and were members of the America East Conference. They finished the season 24–9, 13–3 in America East play to finish in second place. They lost in the quarterfinals of the America East tournament to Hartford. They were invited to the College Basketball Invitational where they lost in the first round to Ohio.

== Roster ==
2015–16 Albany Great Danes men's basketball team
Players
Coaches

Pos.	#	Name	Height	Weight	Year	Previous school	Hometown
G	0	Evan Singletary	6 ft 1 in (1.85 m)	195 lb (88 kg)	Sr	Moberly Area CC	Baltimore, Maryland
G/F	1	Ray Sanders	6 ft 4 in (1.93 m)	210 lb (95 kg)	Sr	Pensacola State College	Tuscaloosa, Alabama
G	2	Jamir Andrews	6 ft 3 in (1.91 m)	220 lb (100 kg)	Jr	Sheridan College	Livermore, CA
G	3	Joe Cremo	6 ft 4 in (1.93 m)	190 lb (86 kg)	Fr	Scotia-Glenville	Scotia, New York
F	10	Mike Rowley	6 ft 8 in (2.03 m)	230 lb (104 kg)	Jr	Knox Grammar School	Sydney, Australia
F	11	Chas Brown	6 ft 8 in (2.03 m)	220 lb (100 kg)	Jr	Baltimore City College	Baltimore, Maryland
G	12	Peter Hooley	6 ft 4 in (1.93 m)	200 lb (91 kg)	Sr	Concordia College (South Australia)	Hahndorf, South Australia
G	13	Reece Williams	6 ft 1 in (1.85 m)	200 lb (91 kg)	Sr	Woodlands	White Plains, New York
G	21	David Nichols	6 ft 0 in (1.83 m)	185 lb (84 kg)	Fr	Midwest Elite Prep	South Holland, Illinois
C	22	Richard Peters	6 ft 11 in (2.11 m)	275 lb (125 kg)	Jr	Tallahassee CC	Pickering, Ontario
F	24	Dallas Ennema	6 ft 6 in (1.98 m)	210 lb (95 kg)	Jr	Sheldon	Sheldon, IA
F	30	Travis Charles	6 ft 6 in (1.98 m)	235 lb (107 kg)	Jr	Howard College	Brooklyn, New York
F/C	34	Kyle McKinley	6 ft 10 in (2.08 m)	220 lb (100 kg)	Fr	Stillwater	Stillwater, Minnesota
F	43	Greig Stire	6 ft 7 in (2.01 m)	225 lb (102 kg)	So	Christian Brothers Academy	Schenectady, New York

Head coach

- Will Brown, 15th yr. (Dowling, 1995)

Assistant coach(es)

- Chad O'Donnell, 12th yr. (Springfield, 1994)
- Jon Iati, 4th yr. (Albany, 2007)
- Josh Pelletier, 2nd (Saint Rose, 2009)

Legend

- (C) Team captain
- (S) Suspended
- (I) Ineligible
- (W) Walk-on
- Injured
- Current redshirt

Roster
Last update: August 30, 2015

== Schedule ==
Date time, TV	Rank^{#}	Opponent^{#}	Result	Record	High points	High rebounds	High assists	Site (attendance) city, state
Non-conference regular season
11/13/2015*; 7:00 pm, SECN		at No. 2 Kentucky; Hoophall Miami Invitational	L 65–78	0–1	18 – Hooley	4 – Stire	4 – Rowley	Rupp Arena (22,080); Lexington, KY
11/16/2015*; 7:00 pm		at Boston University; Hoophall Miami Invitational	L 64–69	0–2	15 – Tied	9 – Sanders	5 – Singletary	Case Gym (502); Boston, MA
11/19/2015*; 7:00 pm		Colgate	W 88–67	1–2	24 – Sanders	6 – Tied	3 – 4 Tied	SEFCU Arena (3,711); Albany, NY
11/21/2015*; 7:00 pm		SUNY Oneonta	W 92–49	2–2	13 – Rowley	10 – Peters	5 – Sanders	SEFCU Arena (3,562); Albany, NY
11/24/2015*; 7:00 pm, ESPN3		at South Florida; Hoophall Miami Invitational	L 61–63	2–3	14 – Singletary	8 – Tied	3 – Tied	USF Sun Dome (2,712); Tampa, FL
11/27/2015*; 7:00 pm		NJIT; Hoophall Miami Invitational	W 74–73	3–3	18 – Cremo	10 – Rowley	5 – Rowley	SEFCU Arena (3,253); Albany, NY
11/29/2015*; 2:00 pm		Yale	W 88–54	4–3	21 – Singletary	8 – Hooley	8 – Hooley	SEFCU Arena (2,418); Albany, NY
12/01/2015*; 7:00 pm		at Quinnipiac	W 58–54	5–3	12 – Sanders	9 – Stire	3 – Hooley	TD Bank Sports Center (1,377); Hamden, CT
12/05/2015*; 2:00 pm		at Holy Cross	W 88–84 ^{OT}	6–3	20 – Hooley	9 – Rowley	5 – Singletary	Hart Center (1,494); Worcester, MA
12/09/2015*; 7:00 pm		at Marist	W 75–53	7–3	18 – Sanders	14 – Stire	6 – Hooley	McCann Field House (1,210); Poughkeepsie, NY
12/12/2015*; 7:30 pm, TWCSC		at Siena	L 70–78	7–4	20 – Hooley	9 – Rowley	2 – Tied	Times Union Center (10,790); Albany, NY
12/19/2015*; 7:00 pm		Saint Francis (PA)	W 65–58	8–4	14 – Hooley	1 – Hooley	5 – Hooley	SEFCU Arena (2,762); Albany, NY
12/23/2015*; 7:00 pm		Niagara	W 65–56	9–4	25 – Cremo	2 – Cremo	2 – Cremo	SEFCU Arena (3,182); Albany, NY
12/29/2015*; 7:00 pm		at St. Francis Brooklyn	W 71–66	10–4	19 – Hooley	3 – Hooley	4 – Hooley	Generoso Pope Athletic Complex (708); Brooklyn, NY
01/02/2016*; 7:00 pm		at Cornell	W 75–70	11–4	18 – Sanders	4 – Sanders	3 – Sanders	Newman Arena (1,421); Ithaca, NY
American East regular season
01/06/2016; 7:00 pm		at UMBC	W 73–59	12–4 (1–0)	16 – Sanders	8 – Rowley	6 – Singletary	SEFCU Arena (3,415); Albany, NY
01/09/2016; 12:00 pm, ESPN3		at Vermont	W 69–57	13–4 (2–0)	18 – Rowley	11 – Rowley	3 – Hooley	Patrick Gym (2,392); Burlington, VT
01/12/2016; 7:00 pm		New Hampshire	W 80–75 ^{OT}	14–4 (3–0)	21 – Singletary	9 – Cremo	4 – Singletary	SEFCU Arena (2,363); Albany, NY
01/15/2016; 12:00 pm		at Maine	L 79–81	14–5 (3–1)	29 – Hooley	7 – Rowley	3 – Hooley	Cross Insurance Center (1,406); Bangor, ME
01/18/2016; 7:00 pm, TWCSC		Binghamton	W 80–59	15–5 (4–1)	18 – Hooley	6 – Cremo	5 – Hooley	SEFCU Arena (2,418); Albany, NY
01/22/2016; 9:00 pm, ESPNU		at Stony Brook	L 63–69	15–6 (4–2)	13 – Tied	7 – Hooley	4 – Singletary	Island Federal Credit Union Arena; Stony Brook, NY
01/27/2016; 7:00 pm, TWCSC		UMass Lowell	W 75–63	16–6 (5–5)	22 – Singletary	6 – Rowley	5 – Singletary	SEFCU Arena (2,452); Albany, NY
01/30/2016; 7:00 pm		at Hartford	W 86–60	17–6 (6–2)	27 – Hooley	13 – Hooley	5 – Singletary	Chase Arena at Reich Family Pavilion (2,341); Hartford, CT
02/03/2016; 7:00 pm		at UMBC	W 79–73	18–6 (7–2)	21 – Sanders	9 – Rowley	7 – Sanders	Retriever Activities Center (1,068); Catonsville, MD
02/06/2016; 7:00 pm, TWCSC		Vermont	W 75–71	19–6 (8–2)	20 – Tied	8 – Cremo	3 – Cremo	SEFCU Arena (4,538); Albany, NY
02/08/2016; 7:00 pm		at Binghamton	W 69–56	20–6 (9–2)	19 – Singletary	10 – Rowley	6 – Hooley	Binghamton University Events Center (4,923); Vestal, NY
02/11/2016; 7:00 pm, ESPN3		at New Hampshire	L 68–69	20–7 (9–3)	23 – Sanders	6 – Stire	4 – Hooley	Lundholm Gym (843); Durham, NH
02/14/2016; 2:00 pm, TWCSC		Maine	W 108–64	21–7 (10–3)	22 – Sanders	8 – Cremo	8 – Singletary	SEFCU Arena (2,716); Albany, NY
02/17/2016; 7:00 pm, ESPN3		Stony Brook	W 82–70	22–7 (11–3)	16 – Cremo	12 – Hooley	2 – 5 tied	SEFCU Arena (4,578); Albany, NY
02/24/2016; 7:00 pm		at UMass Lowell	W 86–61	23–7 (12–3)	16 – Stire	15 – Stire	4 – Sanders	Tsongas Center (3,351); Lowell, MA
02/27/2016; 7:00 pm		Hartford	W 75–59	24–7 (13–3)	19 – Singletary	10 – Stire	5 – Singletary	SEFCU Arena (4,408); Albany, NY
America East tournament
03/02/2016; 7:00 pm, ESPN3	(2)	(7) Hartford; Quarterfinals	L 59–68	24–8	13 – Sanders	8 – Stire	6 – Singletary	SEFCU Arena (2,535); Albany, NY
CBI
03/16/2016*; 7:00 pm		at Ohio; First round	L 90–94 ^{OT}	24–9	19 – Singletary	9 – Rowley	4 – Rowley	Convocation Center (3,034); Athens, OH
*Non-conference game. ^{#}Rankings from AP poll. (#) Tournament seedings in parentheses. All times are in Eastern Time.
