= 2015–16 Vermont Catamounts men's basketball team =

American college basketball season

2015–16 Vermont Catamounts men's basketball

CBI, Semifinals
- Conference: America East Conference
- Record: 23–14 (11–5 America East)
- Head coach: John Becker (5th season)
- Assistant coaches: Kyle Cieplicki; Ryan Schneider; Hamlet Tibbs
- Home arena: Patrick Gym

2015–16 America East Conference men's basketball standings
	Conf.				Overall
Team	W		L	PCT	W		L	PCT
Stony Brook †	14	–	2	.875	26	–	7	.788
Albany	13	–	3	.813	24	–	9	.727
Vermont	11	–	5	.688	23	–	14	.622
New Hampshire	11	–	5	.688	20	–	13	.606
UMass Lowell*	7	–	9	.438	11	–	18	.379
Binghamton	5	–	11	.313	8	–	22	.267
Hartford	4	–	12	.250	10	–	23	.303
Maine	4	–	12	.250	8	–	22	.267
UMBC	3	–	13	.188	7	–	25	.219
† 2016 America East tournament winner * Ineligible for postseason during transition to Division I.

The 2015–16 Vermont Catamounts men's basketball team represented the University of Vermont during the 2015–16 NCAA Division I men's basketball season. The Catamounts, led by fifth year head coach John Becker, played their home games at Patrick Gym and were members of the America East Conference. They finished the season 23–14, 11–5 in America East play to finish in a tie for third place. They Maine and New Hampshire to advance to the championship game of the America East tournament where they lost to Stony Brook. They were invited to the College Basketball Invitational where they defeated Western Carolina and Seattle to advance to the semifinals where they lost to Nevada.

== Roster ==
2015–16 Vermont Catamounts men's basketball team
Players
Coaches

Pos.	#	Name	Height	Weight	Year	Previous school	Hometown
G/F	1	Josh Hearlihy (redshirt)	6 ft 8 in (2.03 m)	213 lb (97 kg)	Jr	Northfield Mount Hermon; Tulane	Los Angeles, California
G	2	Trae Bell-Haynes	6 ft 2 in (1.88 m)	170 lb (77 kg)	So	Bill Crothers Secondary	Toronto, Ontario
G	4	David Urso (W)	6 ft 2 in (1.88 m)	195 lb (88 kg)	So	Central Catholic	Pittsburgh, Pennsylvania
F	5	Dylan Sinnickson (W)	6 ft 5 in (1.96 m)	195 lb (88 kg)	Sr	Hotchkiss; Middlebury	Sands Point, New York
F	12	Darren Payen	6 ft 8 in (2.03 m)	217 lb (98 kg)	RS Jr	Hamden Hall; Hofstra	Milford, Connecticut
G	14	Cam Ward	6 ft 2 in (1.88 m)	155 lb (70 kg)	So	Marshall	Marshall, Wisconsin
G	20	Ernie Duncan	6 ft 3 in (1.91 m)	192 lb (87 kg)	RS Fr	Harrison	Evansville, Indiana
G	21	Everett Duncan	6 ft 6 in (1.98 m)	165 lb (75 kg)	Fr	Harrison	Evansville, Indiana
G	24	Dre Wills	6 ft 1 in (1.85 m)	177 lb (80 kg)	Jr	Mercersburg Academy	Indianapolis, Indiana
F	25	Drew Urquhart	6 ft 8 in (2.03 m)	219 lb (99 kg)	So	Eastside Catholic	Vancouver, British Columbia
F	32	Ethan O'Day	6 ft 9 in (2.06 m)	201 lb (91 kg)	Sr	E. O. Smith/Northfield Mount Hermon	Mansfield, Connecticut
F	34	Kurt Steidl	6 ft 6 in (1.98 m)	181 lb (82 kg)	Jr	Ridgefield	Ridgefield, Connecticut
F	35	Payton Henson (redshirt)	6 ft 8 in (2.03 m)	215 lb (98 kg)	Jr	Siloam Springs; Tulane	Siloam Springs, Arkansas
F	44	Nate Rohrer (W)	6 ft 7 in (2.01 m)	205 lb (93 kg)	RS So	Leland	Underhill, Vermont

Head coach

- John Becker

Assistant coach(es)

- Kyle Cieplicki
- Ryan Schneider
- Hamlet Tibbs

Legend

- (C) Team captain
- (S) Suspended
- (I) Ineligible
- (W) Walk-on
- Injured
- Current redshirt

Roster
Last update: October 23rd, 2015

== Schedule ==
Date time, TV	Rank^{#}	Opponent^{#}	Result	Record	Site (attendance) city, state
Exhibition
10/31/2015*; 3:00 pm		Keiser	W 78–67		Patrick Gym (1,758); Burlington, VT
11/07/2015*; 4:00 pm		Saint Michael's	W 85–56		Patrick Gym (2,266); Burlington, VT
Non-conference regular season
11/13/2015*; 11:00 am, ESPN3		at Eastern Michigan	L 50–70	0–1	Convocation Center (3,307); Ypsilanti, MI
11/15/2015*; 2:00 pm, ESPN3		at No. 23 Purdue; Hall of Fame Tip Off	L 79–107	0–2	Mackey Arena (12,808); West Lafayette, IN
11/18/2015*; 7:00 pm		Quinnipiac	W 83–70	1–2	Patrick Gym (1,861); Burlington, VT
11/21/2015*; 5:00 pm		vs. Niagara; Hall of Fame Tip Off	W 85–67	2–2	Mohegan Sun Arena (4,507); Uncasville, CT
11/22/2015*; 8:00 pm		vs. Buffalo; Hall of Fame Tip Off	L 71–77	2–3	Mohegan Sun Arena (3,813); Uncasville, CT
11/25/2015*; 3:00 pm, SECN		at Florida; Hall of Fame Tip Off	L 62–86	2–4	O'Connell Center (8,003); Gainesville, FL
11/29/2015*; 2:00 pm		Marist	W 86–60	3–4	Patrick Gym (1,865); Burlington, VT
12/02/2015*; 7:00 pm		at Dartmouth	W 68–63	4–4	Leede Arena (752); Hanover, NH
12/05/2015*; 2:00 pm		at Yale	L 54–72	4–5	Payne Whitney Gymnasium (1,114); New Haven, CT
12/08/2015*; 7:00 pm		at St. Bonaventure	L 68–80	4–6	Reilly Center (3,021); Olean, NY
12/16/2015*; 7:00 pm		UC Santa Barbara	W 75–68	5–6	Patrick Gym (1,776); Burlington, VT
12/19/2015*; 2:00 pm		Fisher	W 84–37	6–6	Patrick Gym (2,034); Burlington, VT
12/22/2015*		at Northeastern	L 65–77	6–7	Matthews Arena (928); Boston, MA
12/29/2015*; 2:00 pm		Siena	W 73–64	7–7	Patrick Gym (2,437); Burlington, VT
01/03/2016*; 2:00 pm, ESPN3		at Harvard	W 65–62	8–7	Lavietes Pavilion (1,526); Cambridge, MA
American East regular season
01/06/2016; 7:00 pm		at Maine	W 90–72	9–7 (1–0)	Cross Insurance Center (1,024); Bangor, ME
01/09/2016; 12:00 pm, ESPN3		Albany	L 57–69	9–8 (1–1)	Patrick Gym (2,392); Burlington, VT
01/16/2016; 7:00 pm		at Hartford	W 83–68	10–8 (2–1)	Chase Arena at Reich Family Pavilion (1,103); Hartford, CT
01/18/2016; 7:00 pm		UMass Lowell	L 82–93	10–9 (2–2)	Patrick Gym (1,939); Burlington, VT
01/21/2016; 7:00 pm		at Binghamton	W 61–52	11–9 (3–2)	Binghamton University Events Center (2,314); Vestal, NY
01/24/2016; 1:00 pm		UMBC	W 79–72	12–9 (4–2)	Patrick Gym (1,925); Burlington, VT
01/27/2016; 7:00 pm, ESPN3		at New Hampshire	W 66–50	13–9 (5–2)	Lundholm Gym (1,202); Durham, NH
01/30/2016; 2:00 pm, ESPN3		Stony Brook	L 61–72	13–10 (5–3)	Patrick Gym (2,658); Burlington, VT
02/03/2016; 7:00 pm		Maine	W 65–62	14–10 (6–3)	Patrick Gym (1,526); Burlington, VT
02/06/2016; 7:00 pm		at Albany	L 71–75	14–11 (6–4)	SEFCU Arena (4,538); Albany, NY
02/08/2016; 7:00 pm		at UMass Lowell	L 93–100	14–12 (6–5)	Costello Athletic Center (437); Lowell, MA
02/14/2016; 2:00 pm		Hartford	W 98–81	15–12 (7–5)	Patrick Gym (2,475); Burlington, VT
02/17/2016; 7:00 pm		Binghamton	W 78–64	16–12 (8–5)	Patrick Gym (1,989); Burlington, VT
02/20/2016; 7:00 pm		at UMBC	W 99–54	17–12 (9–5)	Retriever Activities Center (1,389); Catonsville, MD
02/24/2016; 7:00 pm		New Hampshire	W 73–67	18–12 (10–5)	Patrick Gym (2,242); Burlington, VT
02/27/2016; 7:00 pm		at Stony Brook	W 76–62	19–12 (11–5)	Island Federal Credit Union Arena (4,109); Stony Brook, NY
America East tournament
03/02/2016; 7:30 pm, ESPN3	(3)	(6) Maine; Quarterfinals	W 99–82	20–12	Patrick Gym (2,165); Burlington, VT
03/07/2016; 7:30 pm, ESPN3	(3)	(4) New Hampshire; Semifinals	W 63–56	21–12	Patrick Gym (2,840); Burlington, VT
03/12/2016; 11:00 am, ESPN2	(3)	(1) Stony Brook; Championship game	L 74–80	21–13	Island Federal Credit Union Arena (4,109); Stony Brook, NY
CBI
03/16/2016*; 7:00 pm		Western Carolina; First round	W 79–74	22–13	Patrick Gym (1,486); Burlington, VT
03/21/2016*; 10:00 pm		at Seattle; Quarterfinals	W 73–54	23–13	Connolly Center (999); Seattle, WA
03/23/2016*; 10:00 pm		at Nevada; Semifinals	L 72–86	23–14	Lawlor Events Center (6,133); Reno, NV
*Non-conference game. ^{#}Rankings from AP Poll. (#) Tournament seedings in parentheses. All times are in Eastern Time.
