= Rhode Island Rams men's basketball statistical leaders =

The Rhode Island Rams men's basketball statistical leaders are individual statistical leaders of the Rhode Island Rams men's basketball program in various categories, including points, assists, blocks, rebounds, and steals. Within those areas, the lists identify single-game, single-season, and career leaders. The Rams represent the University of Rhode Island in the NCAA's Atlantic 10 Conference.

Rhode Island began competing in intercollegiate basketball in 1903. However, the school's record book does not generally list records from before the 1950s, as records from before this period are often incomplete and inconsistent. Since scoring was much lower in this era, and teams played much fewer games during a typical season, it is likely that few or no players from this era would appear on these lists anyway.

The NCAA did not officially record assists as a stat until the 1983–84 season, and blocks and steals until the 1985–86 season, but Rhode Island's record books includes players in these stats before these seasons. These lists are updated through the end of the 2020–21 season.

== Scoring ==
Career
Rk	Player	Points	Seasons
1	Carlton Owens	2,114	1984–85 1985–86 1986–87 1987–88
2	Tyson Wheeler	1,918	1994–95 1995–96 1996–97 1997–98
3	E. C. Matthews	1,899	2013–14 2014–15 2015–16 2016–17 2017–18
4	Ernie Calverley	1,868	1942–43 1943–44 1944–45 1945–46
5	Sly Williams	1,777	1976–77 1977–78 1978–79
6	Jimmy Baron	1,765	2005–06 2006–07 2007–08 2008–09
7	Jared Terrell	1,754	2014–15 2015–16 2016–17 2017–18
8	Steve Chubin	1,751	1962–63 1963–64 1965–66
9	Horace Owens	1,750	1979–80 1980–81 1981–82 1982–83
10	Stan Stutz	1,730	1938–39 1939–40 1941–42

Season
Rk	Player	Points	Season
1	Carlton Owens	762	1987–88
2	Tom Garrick	718	1987–88
3	Sly Williams	693	1978–79
4	Steve Chubin	659	1965–66
5	Eric Leslie	645	1989–90
6	Horace Owens	639	1982–83
7	Will Daniels	615	2007–08
8	Delroy James	595	2010–11
9	Jimmy Baron	592	2008–09
	Bill Von Weyhe	592	1955–56

Single game
Rk	Player	Points	Season	Opponent
1	Tom Garrick	50	1987–88	Rutgers
	Tom Harrington	50	1958–59	Brandeis
3	Ernie Calverley	48	1943–44	Maine
4	John Fultz	46	1968–69	Connecticut
5	Sly Williams	44	1978–79	Detroit
	Chet Jaworski	44	1938–39	Arnold
7	Ernie Calverley	42	1944–45	Camp Edwards
8	Ernie Calverley	41	1942–43	Massachusetts
	Fatts Russell	41	2018–19	Saint Joseph’s
10	Larry Johnson	40	1967–68	Maine
	Art Stephenson	40	1966–67	St. Bonaventure
	Dennis McGovern	40	1964–65	Boston College
	Dennis McGovern	40	1963–64	Manhattan
	Fred Conley	40	1940–41	Worcester Tech
	Stan Stutz	40	1939–40	Connecticut

== Rebounds ==
Career
Rk	Player	Rebounds	Seasons
1	Art Stephenson	1,048	1965–66 1966–67 1967–68
2	Gary Koenig	1,039	1959–60 1960–61 1961–62
3	Antonio Reynolds-Dean	1,028	1995–96 1996–97 1997–98 1998–99
4	Kenny Green	996	1985–86 1986–87 1987–88 1988–89 1989–90
5	Cyril Langevine	964	2016–17 2017–18 2018–19 2019–20
6	Kahiem Seawright	869	2005–06 2006–07 2007–08 2008–09
7	Hassan Martin	786	2013–14 2014–15 2015–16 2016–17
8	Jimmy Wright	773	1977–78 1978–79 1979–80 1980–81
9	John Fultz	744	1967–68 1968–69 1969–70
10	Jeff Kent	732	1988–89 1989–90 1990–91 1991–92

Season
Rk	Player	Rebounds	Season
1	Art Stephenson	420	1967–68
2	Gary Koenig	393	1960–61
3	Gary Koenig	386	1961–62
4	Art Stephenson	329	1966–67
5	Cyril Langevine	328	2018–19
6	John Fultz	302	1969–70
	Lamar Odom	302	1998–99
8	Cyril Langevine	300	2019–20
9	Art Stephenson	299	1965–66
10	Antonio Reynolds-Dean	297	1995–96

Single game
Rk	Player	Rebounds	Season	Opponent
1	Art Stephenson	28	1967–68	Brown
2	Gary Koenig	26	1961–62	Miami
3	Art Stephenson	25	1967–68	New Hampshire
4	Gary Koenig	24	1959–60	New Hampshire
	Bill Von Weyhe	24	1956–57	Maine
6	Kuran Iverson	23	2016–17	at Richmond
7	Art Stephenson	22	1966–67	Boston College
8	Art Stephenson	21	1966–67	Maine
9	Mergin Sina	20	1988–89	U.S. International
	Abu Bakr	20	1971–72	Boston University

== Assists ==
Career
Rk	Player	Assists	Seasons
1	Tyson Wheeler	712	1994–95 1995–96 1996–97 1997–98
2	Carlton Owens	502	1984–85 1985–86 1986–87 1987–88
3	Jeff Dowtin	473	2016–17 2017–18 2018–19 2019–20
4	Marquis Jones	459	2007–08 2008–09 2009–10 2010–11
5	Carlos Easterling	420	1989–90 1990–91 1991–92 1992–93
6	Tom Garrick	407	1984–85 1985–86 1986–87 1987–88
7	Jarvis Garrett	398	2014–15 2015–16 2016–17 2017–18
8	Fatts Russell	358	2018–19 2019–20 2020–21
9	Jiggy Williamson	346	1974–75 1975–76 1976–77 1977–78
10	Stan Wright	333	1974–75 1975–76 1976–77 1977–78

Season
Rk	Player	Assists	Season
1	Tyson Wheeler	205	1997–98
2	Tyson Wheeler	203	1995–96
3	Jeff Dowtin	189	2017–18
4	Carlton Owens	179	1987–88
5	Sebastian Thomas	174	2024–25
6	Tyson Wheeler	169	1996–97
7	Parfait Bitee	156	2007–08
8	Herb Dixon	153	1988–89
9	Jarvis Garrett	146	2015–16
	Marquis Jones	146	2009–10

Single game
Rk	Player	Assists	Season	Opponent
1	Tyson Wheeler	13	1997–98	Pennsylvania
2	Herb Dixon	12	1988–89	Arizona State
	Herb Dixon	12	1988–89	Saint Joseph’s
	Tyson Wheeler	12	1996–97	Siena
	Preston Murphy	12	1996–97	Fair. Dickinson.
	Howard Smith	12	2002–03	Northeastern
7	Eric Leslie	11	1988–89	U.S. International
	Tyson Wheeler	11	1997–98	Duquesne
	Lamar Odom	11	1998–99	Geo Washington
	Dustin Hellenga	11	2003–04	Richmond
	Sebastian Thomas	11	2024–25	La Salle

== Steals ==
Career
Rk	Player	Steals	Seasons
1	Keith Cothran	207	2006–07 2007–08 2008–09 2009–10
2	Tyson Wheeler	205	1994–95 1995–96 1996–97 1997–98
3	Tom Garrick	189	1984–85 1985–86 1986–87 1987–88
4	Fatts Russell	186	2018–19 2019–20 2020–21
5	Andre Samuel	175	1990–91 1991–92 1992–93 1993–94
6	Jared Terrell	170	2014–15 2015–16 2016–17 2017–18
7	Carlton Owens	168	1984–85 1985–86 1986–87 1987–88
8	Marquis Jones	165	2007–08 2008–09 2009–10 2010–11
9	Dawan Robinson	151	2002–03 2003–04 2004–05 2005–06
10	Delroy James	146	2007–08 2008–09 2009–10 2010–11

Season
Rk	Player	Steals	Season
1	Tom Garrick	88	1987–88
2	Fatts Russell	86	2019–20
3	Tyler Cochran	85	2025–26
4	Stanford Robinson	69	2017–18
5	Jeff Kent	63	1991–92
	Sebastian Thomas	63	2024–25
7	Keith Cothran	61	2009–10
8	Keith Cothran	59	2007–08
	Tom Garrick	59	1986–87
10	Herb Dixon	58	1988–89
	John Evans	58	1987–88
	Tyson Wheeler	58	1996–97

Single game
Rk	Player	Steals	Season	Opponent
1	Tyler Cochran	9	2025–26	Stonehill
2	Herb Dixon	7	1988–89	Arizona State
	Carlos Easterling	7	1991–92	Duquesne
	Tyson Wheeler	7	1996–97	Siena
	Cuttino Mobley	7	1997–98	Tulane
	Dawan Robinson	7	2002–03	Pittsburgh
	Keith Cothran	7	2006–07	Ohio
	Stanford Robinson	7	2017–18	UNC Asheville
	Stanford Robinson	7	2017–18	Fordham

== Blocks ==
Career
Rk	Player	Blocks	Seasons
1	Kenny Green	328	1985–86 1986–87 1987–88 1988–89 1989–90
2	Hassan Martin	321	2013–14 2014–15 2015–16 2016–17
3	Antonio Reynolds-Dean	235	1995–96 1996–97 1997–98 1998–99
4	Cyril Langevine	166	2016–17 2017–18 2018–19 2019–20
5	Michael Andersen	149	1993–94 1994–95 1995–96 1996–97
6	Bonzie Colson	144	1985–86 1986–87 1987–88 1988–89
7	Makhel Mitchell	116	2020–21 2021–22
8	Luther Clay	113	1997–98 1998–99 1990–00
9	Kahiem Seawright	110	2005–06 2006–07 2007–08 2008–09
10	Lamonte Ulmer	107	2006–07 2007–08 2008–09 2009–10

Season
Rk	Player	Blocks	Season
1	Kenny Green	124	1989–90
2	Hassan Martin	103	2014–15
3	Kenny Green	85	1988–89
	Antonio Reynolds-Dean	85	1997–98
5	Hassan Martin	80	2013–14
6	Makhel Mitchell	74	2021–22
7	Hassan Martin	73	2016–17
8	Hassan Martin	65	2015–16
9	Kenny Green	63	1986–87
10	Tom Garrick	59	1986–87
	Antonio Reynolds-Dean	59	1995–96

Single game
Rk	Player	Blocks	Season	Opponent
1	Hassan Martin	10	2014–15	La Salle
2	Kenny Green	8	1988–89	Duquesne
	Kenny Green	8	1989–90	Brown
	Kenny Green	8	1989–90	Seton Hall
	Kenny Green	8	1989–90	Saint Joseph’s
	Kenny Green	8	1989–90	St. Bonaventure
	Makhel Mitchell	8	2021–22	Boston College
8	Hassan Martin	7	2016–17	Duke
	Hassan Martin	7	2016–17	Dartmouth
	Hassan Martin	7	2014–15	Fordhan
	Jordan Hare	7	2012–13	Loyola (Md.)
	Chris Scotti	7	1984–85	Hartford
	Chris Scotti	7	1984–85	Bryant
