= 2018–19 Rhode Island Rams men's basketball team =

American college basketball season

2018–19 Rhode Island Rams men's basketball
- Conference: Atlantic 10 Conference
- Record: 18–15 (9–9 A-10)
- Head coach: David Cox (1st season)
- Assistant coaches: Tyron Boswell; John Carroll; Kevin Sutton
- Home arena: Ryan Center

2018–19 Atlantic 10 men's basketball standings
	Conf.				Overall
Team	W		L	PCT	W		L	PCT
VCU	16	–	2	.889	25	–	8	.758
Davidson	14	–	4	.778	24	–	10	.706
Dayton	13	–	5	.722	21	–	12	.636
St. Bonaventure	12	–	6	.667	18	–	16	.529
George Mason	11	–	7	.611	18	–	15	.545
Saint Louis †	10	–	8	.556	23	–	13	.639
Duquesne	10	–	8	.556	19	–	13	.594
Rhode Island	9	–	9	.500	18	–	15	.545
La Salle	8	–	10	.444	10	–	21	.323
Saint Joseph's	6	–	12	.333	14	–	19	.424
Richmond	6	–	12	.333	13	–	20	.394
George Washington	4	–	14	.222	9	–	24	.273
Massachusetts	4	–	14	.222	11	–	21	.344
Fordham	3	–	15	.167	12	–	20	.375
† 2019 Atlantic 10 tournament winner

The 2018–19 Rhode Island Rams basketball team represented the University of Rhode Island during the 2018–19 NCAA Division I men's basketball season. The Rams, led by first-year head coach David Cox, played their home games at the Ryan Center in Kingston, Rhode Island as members of the Atlantic 10 Conference. They finished the season 18–15, 9–9 in A-10 Play to finish in 8th place. They defeated La Salle And VCU to advance to the semifinals of the A-10 tournament where they lost to St. Bonaventure.

== Previous season ==
The Rams finished the 2017–18 season 26–8, 15–3 in A-10 play to finish win the A-10 regular season championship. They defeated VCU and Saint Joseph's to advance to the championship game of the A-10 tournament where they lost to Davidson. They received an at-large bid to the NCAA tournament where they defeated Oklahoma in the first round before losing in the second round to Duke.

On March 22, 2018, it was announced that head coach Dan Hurley had accepted the head coaching job at Connecticut. On April 4, assistant coach David Cox was promoted to head coach.

== Offseason ==
=== Departures ===
Name	Number	Pos.	Height	Weight	Year	Hometown	Reason for departure
E. C. Matthews	0	G	6'5"	200	RS Senior	Detroit, MI	Graduated
Jarvis Garrett	1	G	6'0"	175	Senior	Milwaukee, WI	Graduated
Stanford Robinson	13	G	6'4"	200	RS Senior	Landover, MD	Graduated
Jared Terrell	32	G	6'3"	215	Senior	Weymouth, MA	Graduated
Andre Berry	34	F	6'8"	275	Senior	West Hempstead, NY	Graduated

=== 2018 recruiting class ===
College recruiting information
Name	Hometown	School	Height	Weight	Commit date
Jermaine Harris #7 C	Upper Marlboro, MD	Rock Creek Christian Academy	6 ft 9 in (2.06 m)	220 lb (100 kg)	Oct 6, 2017
Jermaine Harris #7 C	Recruit ratings: Scout: Rivals: (83)				
Dana Tate #36 SF	Springfield, MA	Rock Creek Christian Academy	6 ft 6 in (1.98 m)	230 lb (100 kg)	Aug 12, 2017
Dana Tate #36 SF	Recruit ratings: Scout: Rivals: (80)				
Tyrese Martin #76 PG	Woodstock, VA	Massanutten Military Academy	6 ft 5 in (1.96 m)	175 lb (79 kg)	Sep 13, 2017
Tyrese Martin #76 PG	Recruit ratings: Scout: Rivals: (NR)				
Omar Silverio; SG	Bronx, NY	St. Raymond High School for Boys	6 ft 4 in (1.93 m)	190 lb (86 kg)	
Omar Silverio; SG	Recruit ratings: Scout: Rivals: (NR)				
Overall recruit ranking:
Note: In many cases, Scout, Rivals, 247Sports, On3, and ESPN may conflict in their listings of height and weight.; In these cases, the average was taken. ESPN grades are on a 100-point scale.; Sources: "2018 Team Ranking". Rivals.

== Roster ==
2018–19 Rhode Island Rams men's basketball team
Players
Coaches

Pos.	#	Name	Height	Weight	Year	Previous school	Hometown
F	0	Jermaine Harris	6 ft 8 in (2.03 m)	220 lb (100 kg)	Fr	Rock Creek Christian	Upper Marlboro, MD
G	1	Fatts Russell	5 ft 10 in (1.78 m)	165 lb (75 kg)	So	Imhotep Institute	Philadelphia, PA
G	2	Will Leviton (W)	5 ft 8 in (1.73 m)	150 lb (68 kg)	Sr	Classical	Providence, RI
G	4	Tyrese Martin	6 ft 6 in (1.98 m)	195 lb (88 kg)	Fr	Massanutten Military Academy	Allentown, PA
F	5	Ryan Preston	6 ft 6 in (1.98 m)	195 lb (88 kg)	Sr	South Shore; Trinity Valley CC	Brooklyn, NY
F	10	Cyril Langevine	6 ft 8 in (2.03 m)	225 lb (102 kg)	Jr	The Patrick School	East Orange, NJ
G	11	Jeff Dowtin	6 ft 3 in (1.91 m)	180 lb (82 kg)	Jr	St. John's	Washington, D.C.
F	12	Dana Tate	6 ft 7 in (2.01 m)	210 lb (95 kg)	Fr	MacDuffie School	Boston, MA
G	13	Eric Dadika (W)	6 ft 0 in (1.83 m)	175 lb (79 kg)	Jr	Spotswood	Milltown, NJ
G	15	Omar Silverio	6 ft 4 in (1.93 m)	190 lb (86 kg)	Fr	St. Raymond	Bronx, NY
F	21	Mike Layssard Jr.	6 ft 9 in (2.06 m)	255 lb (116 kg)	Jr	Northwood	Lena, LA
G	25	Christion Thompson	6 ft 4 in (1.93 m)	190 lb (86 kg)	RS Jr	Madison Prep	Baton Rouge, LA
F	45	Nicola Akele	6 ft 7 in (2.01 m)	215 lb (98 kg)	Sr	IMG Academy	Treviso, Italy
C	55	Michael Tertsea	6 ft 10 in (2.08 m)	230 lb (104 kg)	RS So	John Carroll School	Makurdi, Nigeria

Head coach

- David Cox (William & Mary)

Assistant coach(es)

- Tyron Boswell (Northeastern)
- John Carroll (Dickinson)
- Kevin Sutton (James Madison)

Legend

- (C) Team captain
- (S) Suspended
- (I) Ineligible
- (W) Walk-on
- Injured
- Current redshirt

Roster

== Schedule and results ==
Date time, TV	Rank^{#}	Opponent^{#}	Result	Record	High points	High rebounds	High assists	Site (attendance) city, state
Exhibition
October 25, 2018*; 7:00 pm		Pace	W 80–65		19 – Russell	7 – Langevine	6 – Dowtin	Ryan Center (4,058); Kingston, RI
Non-conference regular season
November 6, 2018*; 7:00 pm		Bryant; Ocean State Cup	W 97–63	1–0	21 – Russell	10 – Harris	9 – Dowtin	Ryan Center (5,010); Kingston, RI
November 13, 2018*; 7:00 pm		at College of Charleston; A10–CAA Challenge	L 55–66	1–1	18 – Langevine	10 – Langevine	4 – Dowtin	TD Arena (4,276); Charleston, SC
November 16, 2018*; 7:00 pm		Harvard	W 76–74	2–1	31 – Dowtin	10 – Langevine	5 – Russell	Ryan Center (5,494); Kingston, RI
November 24, 2018*; 2:00 pm		Stony Brook	L 58–68	2–2	15 – Langevine	12 – Langevine	3 – Tied	Ryan Center (5,016); Kingston, RI
November 28, 2018*; 7:00 pm		Brown; Ocean State Cup	W 71–51	3–2	19 – Langevine	17 – Langevine	4 – Russell	Ryan Center (4,828); Kingston, RI
December 1, 2018*; 5:00 pm, FS1		at Providence; Ocean State Cup	L 50–59	3–3	18 – Langevine	12 – Langevine	2 – Tied	Dunkin' Donuts Center (12,997); Providence, RI
December 8, 2018*; 1:00 pm		vs. Holy Cross; Worcester Showcase	W 79–63	4–3	19 – Tied	11 – Langevine	4 – Dowtin	DCU Center (2,312); Worcester, MA
December 16, 2018*; 1:00 pm, CBSSN		vs. West Virginia; Hall of Fame Holiday Showcase	W 83–70	5–3	18 – Russell	8 – Thompson	7 – Dowtin	Mohegan Sun Arena; Uncasville, CT
December 22, 2018*; 10:00 pm, ESPN3		vs. Bucknell; Diamond Head Classic Quarterfinals	L 82–84	5–4	26 – Russell	8 – Dowtin	4 – Russell	Stan Sheriff Center; Honolulu, HI
December 24, 2018*; 12:30 am, ESPNU		vs. Charlotte; Diamond Head Classic consolation 2nd round	W 75–61	6–4	20 – Russell	11 – Langevine	5 – Dowtin	Stan Sheriff Center; Honolulu, HI
December 25, 2018*; 3:00 pm, ESPNU		at Hawaii; Diamond Head Classic 5th place game	L 60–68	6–5	17 – Dowtin	14 – Langevine	7 – Russell	Stan Sheriff Center (5,696); Honolulu, HI
December 30, 2018*; 5:00 pm, ESPN+		Middle Tennessee	W 72–60	7–5	17 – Dowtin	8 – Martin	5 – Russell	Ryan Center (6,382); Kingston, RI
Atlantic 10 regular season
January 6, 2019; 4:00 pm, ESPNU		at Saint Louis	L 53–60	7–6 (0–1)	18 – Martin	10 – Langevine	6 – Dowtin	Chaifetz Arena (7,356); St. Louis, MO
January 9, 2019; 7:00 pm, ESPN+		at Richmond	W 78–67	8–6 (1–1)	24 – Dowtin	7 – Tied	5 – Dowtin	Robins Center (5,006); Richmond, VA
January 13, 2019; 5:30 pm, NBCSN		George Mason	L 67–84	8–7 (1–2)	15 – Tied	14 – Langevine	4 – Dowtin	Ryan Center (5,383); Kingston, RI
January 16, 2019; 6:00 pm, CBSSN		St. Bonaventure	W 75–63	9–7 (2–2)	18 – Tied	8 – Langevine	5 – Russell	Ryan Center (5,616); Kingston, RI
January 19, 2019; 2:30 pm, NBCSN		at La Salle	W 78–67	10–7 (3–2)	22 – Dowtin	14 – Langevine	4 – Russell	Tom Gola Arena (2,147); Philadelphia, PA
January 23, 2019; 7:00 pm, CBSSN		VCU	W 71–65	11–7 (4–1)	19 – Russell	7 – Tied	2 – 3 tied	Ryan Center (5,874); Kingston, RI
January 27, 2019; 2:00 pm, Stadium		at Massachusetts	L 70–77	11–8 (4–3)	23 – Martin	7 – Langevine	5 – Russell	Mullins Center (4,145); Amherst, MA
January 30, 2019; 7:00 pm		at Duquesne	L 72–75	11–9 (4–4)	24 – Langevine	8 – Langevine	7 – Russell	Palumbo Center (2,345); Pittsburgh, PA
February 2, 2019; 4:00 pm, CBSSN		Saint Louis	W 65–54	12–9 (5–4)	17 – Dowtin	10 – Martin	4 – Dowtin	Ryan Center (6,129); Kingston, RI
February 6, 2019; 7:00 pm, ESPNU		at Davidson	L 53–68	12–10 (5–5)	16 – Langevine	14 – Langevine	3 – Russell	John M. Belk Arena (4,341); Davidson, NC
February 9, 2019; 4:00 pm, CBSSN		Dayton	L 48–77	12–11 (5–6)	23 – Langevine	10 – Langevine	6 – Dowtin	Ryan Center (7,259); Kingston, RI
February 16, 2019; 2:30 pm, NBCSN		Fordham	L 63–66 ^{OT}	12–12 (5–7)	15 – Russell	18 – Langevine	4 – Russell	Ryan Center (6,258); Kingston, RI
February 19, 2019; 8:00 pm, CBSSN		at VCU	L 42–76	12–13 (5–8)	14 – Dowtin	11 – Langevine	4 – Dowtin	Siegel Center (7,637); Richmond, VA
February 22, 2019; 7:00 pm, ESPN2		Davidson	L 66–75	12–14 (5–9)	16 – Martin	13 – Langevine	3 – Dowtin	Ryan Center (5,543); Kingston, RI
February 26, 2019; 7:00 pm		George Washington	W 80–53	13–14 (6–9)	16 – Dowtin	6 – Langevine	5 – Dowtin	Ryan Center (5,423); Kingston, RI
March 1, 2019; 7:00 pm, ESPN2		at Dayton	W 72–70	14–14 (7–9)	26 – Langevine	8 – Langevine	5 – Russell	UD Arena (13,147); Dayton, OH
March 5, 2019; 7:00 pm, CBSSN		at Saint Joseph's	W 86–85 ^{OT}	15–14 (8–9)	41 – Russell	6 – Preston	3 – Russell	Hagan Arena; Philadelphia, PA
March 9, 2019; 4:00 pm, ESPN+		Massachusetts	W 94–75	16–14 (9–9)	27 – Russell	10 – Langevine	5 – Russell	Ryan Center (6,938); Kingston, RI
Atlantic 10 tournament
March 14, 2019; 12:00 pm, NBCSN	(8)	vs. (9) La Salle; Second Round	W 76–57	17–14	25 – Langevine	12 – Langevine	7 – Russell	Barclays Center (6,802); Brooklyn, NY
March 15, 2019; 12:00 pm, NBCSN	(8)	vs. (1) VCU; Quarterfinals	W 75–70	18–14	22 – Dowtin	9 – Langevine	3 – Martin	Barclays Center (7,194); Brooklyn, NY
March 16, 2019; 1:00 pm, CBSSN	(8)	vs. (4) St. Bonaventure; Semifinals	L 51–68	18–15	15 – Langevine	10 – Martin	3 – Russell	Barclays Center (8,133); Brooklyn, NY
*Non-conference game. ^{#}Rankings from AP Poll. (#) Tournament seedings in parentheses. All times are in Eastern Time.

== See also ==
- 2018–19 Rhode Island Rams women's basketball team
