= 2015–16 Rhode Island Rams men's basketball team =

American college basketball season

2015–16 Rhode Island Rams men's basketball
- Conference: Atlantic 10 Conference
- Record: 17–15 (9–9 A-10)
- Head coach: Dan Hurley (4th season)
- Assistant coaches: David Cox; Luke Murray; Antonio Reynolds Dean
- Home arena: Ryan Center

2015–16 Atlantic 10 men's basketball standings
	Conf.				Overall
Team	W		L	PCT	W		L	PCT
Dayton	14	–	4	.778	25	–	8	.758
VCU	14	–	4	.778	25	–	11	.694
St. Bonaventure	14	–	4	.778	22	–	9	.710
Saint Joseph's †	13	–	5	.722	28	–	8	.778
George Washington	11	–	7	.611	28	–	10	.737
Davidson	10	–	8	.556	20	–	13	.606
Rhode Island	9	–	9	.500	17	–	15	.531
Fordham	8	–	10	.444	17	–	14	.548
Richmond	7	–	11	.389	16	–	16	.500
UMass	6	–	12	.333	14	–	18	.438
Duquesne	6	–	12	.333	17	–	17	.500
George Mason	5	–	13	.278	11	–	21	.344
Saint Louis	5	–	13	.278	11	–	21	.344
La Salle	4	–	14	.222	9	–	22	.290
† 2016 A10 Tournament winner

The 2015–16 Rhode Island Rams basketball team represented the University of Rhode Island during the 2015–16 NCAA Division I men's basketball season. The Rams, led by fourth year head coach Dan Hurley, played their home games at the Ryan Center and were members of the Atlantic 10 Conference. They finished the season 17–15, 9–9 in A-10 play to finish in seventh place. They lost in the second round of the A-10 tournament to Massachusetts.

== Previous season ==
The Rams finished the 2014–15 season 23–10, 13–5 in A-10 play to finish in a tie for second place. They advanced to the semifinals of the A-10 tournament where they lost to Dayton. They were invited to the National Invitation Tournament where they defeated Iona in the first round before losing in the second round to Stanford.

== Departures ==
Name	Number	Pos.	Height	Weight	Year	Hometown	Notes
Jarelle Reischel	2	F	6'6"	215	RS Junior	Frankfurt, Germany	Graduate transferred to Eastern Kentucky
Jordan Hare	4	F	6'10"	205	Junior	Saginaw, MI	Transferred
Biggie Minis	10	G	6'3"	200	RS Junior	Philadelphia, PA	Graduate transferred to Wright State
Matthew Butler	11	G	6'2"	200	Sophomore	Memphis, TN	Transferred to Tennessee–Martin
T. J. Buchanan	13	G	6'3"	195	Senior	Kalamazoo, MI	Graduated
Eric Youncofski	20	G	5'10"	150	Junior	Middletown, NJ	Graduated after 3 Seasons.
Gilvydas Biruta	55	F	6'8"	245	RS Senior	Jonava, Lithuania	Graduated

=== Incoming transfers ===
Name	Number	Pos.	Height	Weight	Year	Hometown	Previous School
Four McGlynn	4	G	6'2"	180	RS Senior	York, PA	Transferred from Towson. Will be eligible to play immediately since McGlynn graduated from Towson.
Stanford Robinson	14	G	6'4"	205	Junior	Landover, MD	Transferred from Indiana. Under NCAA transfer rules, Robinson will have to sit out for the 2015–16 season. Will have two years of remaining eligibility.
Kuran Iverson	23	F	6'9"	205	Junior	Windsor, CT	Transferred from Memphis. Will be eligible to play

== Incoming recruits ==
College recruiting information
Name	Hometown	School	Height	Weight	Commit date
Leroy Butts; PF	Clinton, MD	Elev8 Basketball Academy	6 ft 7 in (2.01 m)	200 lb (91 kg)	Jun 29, 2014
Leroy Butts; PF	Recruit ratings: Scout: Rivals: (76)				
Christion Thompson; SF	Baton Rouge, LA	Madison Prep Academy	6 ft 4 in (1.93 m)	195 lb (88 kg)	Sep 21, 2014
Christion Thompson; SF	Recruit ratings: Scout: Rivals: (NR)				
Andre Berry; PF	West Hempstead, NY	New Mexico Military Inst.	6 ft 8 in (2.03 m)	260 lb (120 kg)	May 7, 2015
Andre Berry; PF	Recruit ratings: Scout: Rivals: (NR)				
Nikola Akele; PF	Bradenton, FL	IMG Academy	6 ft 8 in (2.03 m)	N/A	
Nikola Akele; PF	Recruit ratings: Scout: Rivals: (NR)				
Overall recruit ranking:
Note: In many cases, Scout, Rivals, 247Sports, On3, and ESPN may conflict in their listings of height and weight.; In these cases, the average was taken. ESPN grades are on a 100-point scale.; Sources: "2015 Team Ranking". Rivals.

== Roster ==
2015–16 Rhode Island Rams men's basketball team
Players
Coaches

Pos.	#	Name	Height	Weight	Year	Previous school	Hometown
G	0	E. C. Matthews (injured) (redshirt)	6 ft 5 in (1.96 m)	205 lb (93 kg)	Jr	Romulus	Detroit, MI
G	1	Jarvis Garrett	6 ft 0 in (1.83 m)	175 lb (79 kg)	So	Notre Dame Prep	Milwaukee, WI
G	4	Four McGlynn	6 ft 2 in (1.88 m)	200 lb (91 kg)	RS Sr	Dallastown Area; Towson	York, PA
F	10	Rex Sunahara (W)	6 ft 5 in (1.96 m)	200 lb (91 kg)	Fr	Bay	Bay Village, OH
F	12	Hassan Martin	6 ft 7 in (2.01 m)	230 lb (104 kg)	Jr	Curtis	Staten Island, NY
G	13	Stanford Robinson (I) (redshirt)	6 ft 4 in (1.93 m)	200 lb (91 kg)	Jr	Findlay Prep; Indiana	Landover, Maryland
C	14	Ifeanyi Onyekaba	6 ft 8 in (2.03 m)	265 lb (120 kg)	Sr	Virginia Episcopal School	Abuja, Nigeria
G	22	Rory Temkin (W)	6 ft 3 in (1.91 m)	170 lb (77 kg)	Sr	Bishop Hendricken	Narragansett, RI
F	23	Kuran Iverson	6 ft 9 in (2.06 m)	215 lb (98 kg)	Jr	Fishburne Military Academy; Memphis	Windsor, CT
G	25	Christion Thompson	6 ft 4 in (1.93 m)	190 lb (86 kg)	Fr	Madison Prep	Baton Rouge, LA
G	30	Shane Plunkett	6 ft 3 in (1.91 m)	195 lb (88 kg)	Sr	Long Island Lutheran	Brookville, NY
G	32	Jared Terrell	6 ft 3 in (1.91 m)	215 lb (98 kg)	So	Brewster Academy	Weymouth, MA
C	33	Earl Watson	6 ft 7 in (2.01 m)	245 lb (111 kg)	Sr	Queen City Prep Academy; Chipola College	Fort Pierce, FL
F	34	Andre Berry	6 ft 8 in (2.03 m)	285 lb (129 kg)	So	St. Andrew's; New Mexico Military Institute	West Hempstead, NY
F	45	Nicola Akele	6 ft 7 in (2.01 m)	210 lb (95 kg)	Fr	IMG Academy	Treviso, Italy

Head coach

- Dan Hurley (Seton Hall)

Assistant coach(es)

- David Cox (William & Mary)
- Jim Carr (York College)
- Antonio Reynolds Dean (Rhode Island)

Legend

- (C) Team captain
- (S) Suspended
- (I) Ineligible
- (W) Walk-on
- Injured
- Current redshirt

Roster

== Schedule ==
Date time, TV	Rank^{#}	Opponent^{#}	Result	Record	Site (attendance) city, state
Non-conference regular season
11/13/2015*; 8:00 pm, OSN		American	W 65–42	1–0	Ryan Center (5,089); Kingston, RI
11/17/2015*; 10:00 am, ESPN2		Valparaiso; College Hoops Tip-Off Marathon	L 55–58	1–1	Ryan Center (4,881); Kingston, RI
11/21/2015*; 7:30 pm		Cleveland State; Cancún Challenge	W 73–45	2–1	Ryan Center (4,721); Kingston, RI
11/24/2015*; 6:00 pm, CBSSN		vs. TCU; Cancún Challenge semifinals	W 66–60	3–1	Hard Rock Hotel Riviera Maya (982); Cancún, Mexico
11/25/2015*; 6:30 pm, CBSSN		vs. No. 2 Maryland; Cancún Challenge championship	L 63–86	3–2	Hard Rock Hotel Riviera Maya (982); Cancún, Mexico
11/29/2015*; 2:00 pm		Rider; Cancún Challenge	W 82–57	4–2	Ryan Center (3,320); Kingston, RI
12/02/2015*; 7:00 pm, OSN		Holy Cross	W 74–56	5–2	Ryan Center (3,442); Kingston, RI
12/05/2015*; 7:00 pm, ESPNU		No. 23 Providence; Ocean State Cup	L 72–74	5–3	Ryan Center (7,678); Kingston, RI
12/08/2015*; 7:00 pm, OSN		Houston	W 67–57	6–3	Ryan Center (3,633); Kingston, RI
12/13/2015*; 2:00 pm, ESPN3		at Nebraska	L 67–70	6–4	Pinnacle Bank Arena (15,496); Lincoln, NE
12/22/2015*; 7:00 pm, ASN		at Old Dominion	L 65–71	7–5	Ted Constant Convocation Center (6,298); Norfolk, VA
12/30/2015*; 7:00 pm		at Brown; Ocean State Cup	W 88–85 ^{OT}	8–5	Pizzitola Sports Center (2,516); Providence, RI
Atlantic 10 regular season
01/02/2016; 4:30 pm, NBCSN		Saint Louis	W 85–57	9–5 (1–0)	Ryan Center (4,517); Kingston, RI
01/05/2016; 7:00 pm, ESPNU		Richmond	W 77–65	10–5 (2–0)	Ryan Center (4,017); Kingston, RI
01/10/2016; 12:00 pm, NBCSN		at Saint Joseph's	L 67–72	10–6 (2–1)	Hagan Arena (4,080); Philadelphia, PA
01/13/2016; 7:00 pm		at St. Bonaventure	L 64–69	10–7 (2–2)	Reilly Center (3,219); Olean, NY
01/16/2016; 2:30 pm, NBCSN		La Salle	W 73–62	11–7 (3–2)	Ryan Center (3,872); Kingston, RI
01/22/2016; 7:00 pm, ESPN2		at George Washington	L 58–62	11–8 (3–3)	Charles E. Smith Center (2,913); Washington, D.C.
01/27/2016; 7:00 pm, ASN		Fordham	W 79–63	12–8 (4–3)	Ryan Center (4,195); Kingston, RI
01/30/2016; 6:00 pm, CBSSN		Saint Joseph's	L 55–64	12–9 (4–4)	Ryan Center (6,907); Kingston, RI
02/02/2016; 7:00 pm, ASN		at Massachusetts	L 56–61	12–10 (4–5)	Mullins Center (2,423); Amherst, MA
02/06/2016; 8:00 pm, ASN		at La Salle	W 79–62	13–10 (5–5)	Hagan Arena (1,889); Philadelphia, PA
02/09/2016; 7:00 pm, OSN		George Mason	W 81–63	14–10 (6–5)	Ryan Center (3,951); Kingston, RI
02/12/2016; 7:00 pm, ESPN2		No. 19 Dayton	L 66–68	14–11 (6–6)	Ryan Center (6,105); Kingston, RI
02/16/2016; 7:30 pm, CBSSN		at VCU	L 67–83	14–12 (6–7)	Siegel Center (7,637); Richmond, VA
02/20/2016; 7:00 pm, OSN		Duquesne	W 77–74	15–12 (7–7)	Ryan Center (5,112); Kingston, RI
02/23/2016; 6:00 pm, CBSSN		at Davidson	L 54–65	15–13 (7–8)	John M. Belk Arena (4,064); Davidson, NC
02/27/2016; 12:00 pm, ESPN2		at Dayton	W 75–66	16–13 (8–8)	UD Arena (13,455); Dayton, OH
03/03/2016; 7:00 pm, CBSSN		Massachusetts	W 68–50	17–13 (9–8)	Ryan Center (5,113); Kingston, RI
03/05/2016; 2:00 pm, OSN		at Fordham	L 61–64	17–14 (9–9)	Rose Hill Gymnasium (3,200); Bronx, NY
Atlantic 10 tournament
03/10/2016; 6:30, NBCSN	(7)	vs. (10) Massachusetts; Second round	L 62–67	17–15	Barclays Center (5,507); Brooklyn, NY
*Non-conference game. ^{#}Rankings from AP Poll. (#) Tournament seedings in parentheses. All times are in Eastern Time.

== See also ==
- 2015–16 Rhode Island Rams women's basketball team
