= 2017–18 Rhode Island Rams men's basketball team =

American college basketball season

2017–18 Rhode Island Rams men's basketball

Atlantic 10 regular season champions

NCAA tournament, Second Round
- Conference: Atlantic 10 Conference
- Record: 26–8 (15–3 A-10)
- Head coach: Dan Hurley (6th season)
- Assistant coaches: David Cox; Tyron Boswell; Tom Moore
- Home arena: Ryan Center

2017–18 Atlantic 10 men's basketball standings
	Conf.				Overall
Team	W		L	PCT	W		L	PCT
Rhode Island	15	–	3	.833	26	–	8	.765
St. Bonaventure	14	–	4	.778	26	–	8	.765
Davidson †	13	–	5	.722	21	–	12	.636
Saint Joseph's	10	–	8	.556	16	–	16	.500
VCU	9	–	9	.500	18	–	15	.545
Saint Louis	9	–	9	.500	17	–	16	.515
George Mason	9	–	9	.500	16	–	17	.485
Richmond	9	–	9	.500	12	–	20	.375
Dayton	8	–	10	.444	14	–	17	.452
Duquesne	7	–	11	.389	16	–	16	.500
George Washington	7	–	11	.389	15	–	18	.455
La Salle	7	–	11	.389	13	–	19	.406
Massachusetts	5	–	13	.278	13	–	20	.394
Fordham	4	–	14	.222	9	–	22	.290
† 2018 A10 Tournament winner Rankings from AP poll

The 2017–18 Rhode Island Rams basketball team represented the University of Rhode Island during the 2017–18 NCAA Division I men's basketball season. The Rams, led by sixth-year head coach Dan Hurley, played their home games at the Ryan Center in Kingston, Rhode Island as members of the Atlantic 10 Conference. They finished the season 26–8, 15–3 in A-10 play to finish win the A-10 regular season championship. They defeated VCU and Saint Joseph's to advance to the championship game of the A-10 tournament where they lost to Davidson. They received an at-large bid to the NCAA tournament where they defeated Oklahoma in the first round before losing in the second round to Duke.

On March 22, 2018, it was announced that head coach Dan Hurley had accepted the head coaching job at Connecticut. On April 4, assistant coach David Cox was promoted to head coach.

== Previous season ==
The Rams finished the 2016–17 season 25–10, 13–5 in A-10 play to finish in a tie for third place. In the A-10 tournament, they defeated St. Bonaventure, Davidson, and VCU to win the A-10 Tournament championship. As a result, they received the conference's automatic bid to the NCAA tournament as the No. 11 seed in the Midwest region. They received a No. 11 seed in the Midwest region where they defeated No. 6-seeded Creighton in the first round before losing to No. 3-seeded Oregon in the second round.

== Offseason ==
=== Departures ===
Name	Number	Pos.	Height	Weight	Year	Hometown	Reason for departure
Hassan Martin	12	F	6'7"	235	Senior	Staten Island, NY	Graduated
Kuran Iverson	23	F	6'9"	215	Senior	Windsor, CT	Graduated

=== Incoming transfers ===
Name	Number	Pos.	Height	Weight	Year	Hometown	Previous School
Ryan Preston	5	F	6'7"	230	Junior	Brooklyn, NY	Junior college transferred from Trinity Valley CC

=== 2017 recruiting class ===
College recruiting
Name	Hometown	School	Height	Weight	Commit date
Fatts Russell #37 PG	Philadelphia, PA	Imhotep Institute	5 ft 10 in (1.78 m)	150 lb (68 kg)	Sep 20, 2016
Fatts Russell #37 PG	Recruit ratings: Scout: Rivals: (79)				
Overall recruit ranking:
Note: In many cases, Scout, Rivals, 247Sports, On3, and ESPN may conflict in their listings of height and weight.; In these cases, the average was taken. ESPN grades are on a 100-point scale.; Sources: "2017 Team Ranking". Rivals.

=== 2018 recruiting class ===
College recruiting (2018)
Name	Hometown	School	Height	Weight	Commit date
Jermaine Harris #7 C	Upper Marlboro, MD	Rock Creek Christian Academy	6 ft 9 in (2.06 m)	220 lb (100 kg)	Oct 6, 2017
Jermaine Harris #7 C	Recruit ratings: Scout: Rivals: (83)				
Dana Tate #36 SF	Springfield, MA	Rock Creek Christian Academy	6 ft 6 in (1.98 m)	230 lb (100 kg)	Aug 12, 2017
Dana Tate #36 SF	Recruit ratings: Scout: Rivals: (80)				
Tyrese Martin #76 PG	Woodstock, VA	Massanutten Military Academy	6 ft 5 in (1.96 m)	175 lb (79 kg)	Sep 13, 2017
Tyrese Martin #76 PG	Recruit ratings: Scout: Rivals: (NR)				
Omar Silverio; SG	Bronx, NY	St. Raymond High School for Boys	6 ft 4 in (1.93 m)	190 lb (86 kg)	
Omar Silverio; SG	Recruit ratings: Scout: Rivals: (NR)				
Overall recruit ranking:
Note: In many cases, Scout, Rivals, 247Sports, On3, and ESPN may conflict in their listings of height and weight.; In these cases, the average was taken. ESPN grades are on a 100-point scale.; Sources: "2018 Team Ranking". Rivals.

== Preseason ==
In a poll of the league’s head coaches and select media members at the conference's media day, the Rams were picked to win the A-10, receiving 27 of 28 first place votes. E.C. Matthews was selected to the conference's preseason first team while Jared Terrell was picked for the preseason second team.

== Roster ==
2017–18 Rhode Island Rams men's basketball team
Players
Coaches

Pos.	#	Name	Height	Weight	Year	Previous school	Hometown
G	0	E. C. Matthews	6 ft 5 in (1.96 m)	200 lb (91 kg)	RS Sr	Romulus	Detroit, MI
G	1	Jarvis Garrett	6 ft 0 in (1.83 m)	175 lb (79 kg)	Sr	Notre Dame Prep	Milwaukee, WI
G	2	Fatts Russell	5 ft 10 in (1.78 m)	165 lb (75 kg)	Fr	Imhotep Institute	Philadelphia, PA
G	4	Will Leviton (W)	5 ft 8 in (1.73 m)	150 lb (68 kg)	Jr	Classical	Providence, RI
F	5	Ryan Preston	6 ft 7 in (2.01 m)	230 lb (104 kg)	Jr	South Shore; Trinity Valley CC	Brooklyn, NY
F	10	Cyril Langevine	6 ft 8 in (2.03 m)	225 lb (102 kg)	So	The Patrick School	East Orange, NJ
G	11	Jeff Dowtin	6 ft 3 in (1.91 m)	170 lb (77 kg)	So	St. John's	Washington, D.C.
G	13	Stanford Robinson	6 ft 4 in (1.93 m)	200 lb (91 kg)	RS Sr	Findlay Prep; Indiana	Landover, MD
G	15	Eric Dadika (W)	6 ft 0 in (1.83 m)	175 lb (79 kg)	So	Spotswood	Milltown, NJ
F	21	Mike Layssard Jr.	6 ft 9 in (2.06 m)	255 lb (116 kg)	So	Northwood	Lena, LA
G	25	Christion Thompson	6 ft 4 in (1.93 m)	190 lb (86 kg)	Jr	Madison Prep	Baton Rouge, LA
G	32	Jared Terrell	6 ft 3 in (1.91 m)	215 lb (98 kg)	Sr	Brewster Academy	Weymouth, MA
F	34	Andre Berry	6 ft 8 in (2.03 m)	275 lb (125 kg)	Sr	St. Andrew's; New Mexico Military Institute	West Hempstead, NY
F	45	Nicola Akele	6 ft 7 in (2.01 m)	215 lb (98 kg)	Jr	IMG Academy	Treviso, Italy
C	55	Michael Tertsea	6 ft 10 in (2.08 m)	230 lb (104 kg)	RS Fr	John Carroll School	Makurdi, Nigeria

Head coach

- Dan Hurley (Seton Hall)

Assistant coach(es)

- David Cox (William & Mary)
- Tyron Boswell (Northeastern)
- Tom Moore (Boston University)

Legend

- (C) Team captain
- (S) Suspended
- (I) Ineligible
- (W) Walk-on
- Injured
- Current redshirt

Roster

== Schedule and results ==
Date time, TV	Rank^{#}	Opponent^{#}	Result	Record	High points	High rebounds	High assists	Site (attendance) city, state
Exhibition
Oct 28, 2017*; 1:00 pm		Buffalo; Charity Exhibition for Disaster Relief	W 80–72 ^{OT}		24 – Terrell	12 – Robinson	5 – Garrett	Ryan Center (1,363); Kingston, RI
Non-conference regular season
Nov 10, 2017*; 7:30 pm		UNC Asheville; NIT Season Tipoff	W 84–60	1–0	18 – Robinson	5 – Preston	5 – Terrell	Ryan Center (6,367); Kingston, RI
Nov 13, 2017*; 11:30 pm, ESPNU		at Nevada	L 81–88	1–1	24 – Terrell	6 – Akele	6 – Dowtin	Lawlor Events Center (7,737); Reno, NV
Nov 19, 2017*; 1:00 pm		Holy Cross	W 88–66	2–1	25 – Terrell	5 – Tied	9 – Dowtin	Ryan Center (4,309); Kingston, RI
Nov 23, 2017*; 6:00 pm, ESPNU		vs. No. 20 Seton Hall; NIT Season Tipoff semifinals	W 75–74	3–1	32 – Terrell	7 – Berry	2 – Dowtin	Barclays Center (1,874); Brooklyn, NY
Nov 24, 2017*; 7:30 pm, ESPNU		vs. Virginia; NIT Season Tipoff championship game	L 55–70	3–2	12 – Berry	7 – Berry	6 – Terrell	Barclays Center (3,952); Brooklyn, NY
Nov 28, 2017*; 7:00 pm		Brown; Ocean State Cup	W 86–62	4–2	20 – Russell	8 – Robinson	4 – Russell	Ryan Center (4,485); Kingston, RI
Dec 2, 2017*; 5:00 pm, CBSSN		Providence; Ocean State Cup	W 75–68	5–2	15 – Garrett	12 – Robinson	4 – Tied	Ryan Center (7,959); Kingston, RI
Dec 6, 2017*; 8:00 pm, SECN+		at Alabama	L 64–68	5–3	18 – Garrett	5 – Langevine	2 – 3 tied	Coleman Coliseum (12,807); Tuscaloosa, AL
Dec 16, 2017*; 4:00 pm		College of Charleston	W 68–62	6–3	21 – Terrell	10 – Tied	3 – Dowtin	Ryan Center (5,761); Kingston, RI
Dec 21, 2017*; 7:00 pm		Iona	W 80–74	7–3	23 – Terrell	10 – Robinson	6 – Dowtin	Ryan Center (4,381); Kingston, RI
Dec 27, 2017*; 7:00 pm, ESPNU		Florida Gulf Coast	W 80–60	8–3	20 – Matthews	7 – Robinson	6 – Terrell	Ryan Center (5,347); Kingston, RI
Atlantic 10 regular season
Dec 30, 2017; 4:00 pm		George Mason	W 83–64	9–3 (1–0)	18 – Matthews	10 – Langevine	8 – Dowtin	Ryan Center (6,383); Kingston, RI
Jan 3, 2018; 7:00 pm		La Salle	W 74–62	10–3 (2–0)	24 – Matthews	6 – Matthews	3 – Dowtin	Ryan Center (4,549); Kingston, RI
Jan 6, 2018; 4:00 pm		at George Washington	W 81–60	11–3 (3–0)	22 – Terrell	10 – Langevine	9 – Dowtin	Charles E. Smith Center (2,249); Washington, D.C.
Jan 9, 2018; 7:00 pm, CBSSN		at Saint Louis	W 72–65	12–3 (4–0)	20 – Terrell	10 – Berry	8 – Dowtin	Chaifetz Arena (5,179); St. Louis, MO
Jan 13, 2018; 11:00 am, ESPNU		St. Bonaventure	W 87–73	13–3 (5–0)	20 – Matthews	9 – Tied	9 – Dowtin	Ryan Center (7,082); Kingston, RI
Jan 17, 2018; 7:00 pm		Massachusetts	W 73–51	14–3 (6–0)	24 – Terrell	12 – Robinson	6 – Dowtin	Ryan Center (5,583); Kingston, RI
Jan 20, 2018; 1:00 pm, CBSSN		at Dayton	W 88–74	15–3 (7–0)	24 – Terrell	7 – Matthews	7 – Garrett	UD Arena (13,350); Dayton, OH
Jan 24, 2018; 7:00 pm, Stadium	No. 24	at Fordham	W 78–58	16–3 (8–0)	20 – Berry	7 – Langevine	5 – Tied	Rose Hill Gymnasium (2,015); Bronx, NY
Jan 27, 2018; 12:00 pm, NBCSN	No. 24	Duquesne	W 61–58	17–3 (9–0)	20 – Matthews	5 – Tied	6 – Dowtin	Ryan Center (7,432); Kingston, RI
Jan 30, 2018; 6:30 pm, CBSSN	No. 22	at Massachusetts	W 85–83	18–3 (10–0)	19 – Dowtin	5 – Robinson	10 – Dowtin	Mullins Center (4,194); Amherst, MA
Feb 2, 2018; 7:00 pm, ESPN2	No. 22	at VCU	W 81–68	19–3 (11–0)	18 – Matthews	18 – Langevine	6 – Dowtin	Siegel Center (7,637); Richmond, VA
Feb 9, 2018; 7:00 pm, ESPN2	No. 18	Davidson	W 72–59	20–3 (12–0)	17 – Garrett	8 – Langevine	5 – Dowtin	Ryan Center (7,743); Kingston, RI
Feb 13, 2018; 8:30 pm, CBSSN	No. 16	Richmond	W 85–67	21–3 (13–0)	17 – Terrell	6 – Langevine	7 – Dowtin	Ryan Center (7,019); Kingston, RI
Feb 16, 2018; 7:00 pm, ESPN2	No. 16	at St. Bonaventure	L 74–77	21–4 (13–1)	23 – Terrell	10 – Langevine	5 – Dowtin	Reilly Center (5,480); Olean, NY
Feb 20, 2018; 7:00 pm, CBSSN	No. 18	at La Salle	W 95–93 ^{OT}	22–4 (14–1)	25 – Dowtin	7 – Robinson	7 – Dowtin	Tom Gola Arena (1,841); Philadelphia, PA
Feb 23, 2018; 7:00 pm, ESPN2	No. 18	Dayton	W 81–56	23–4 (15–1)	20 – Dowtin	5 – Tied	5 – Dowtin	Ryan Center (7,880); Kingston, RI
Feb 27, 2018; 7:00 pm, CBSSN	No. 17	Saint Joseph's	L 48–78	23–5 (15–2)	19 – Terrell	7 – Terrell	4 – Dowtin	Ryan Center (7,186); Kingston, RI
Mar 2, 2018; 8:00 pm, CBSSN	No. 17	at Davidson	L 61–63	23–6 (15–3)	22 – Terrell	8 – Robinson	4 – Matthews	John M. Belk Arena (4,442); Davidson, NC
Atlantic 10 tournament
Mar 9, 2018; 12:00 pm, NBCSN	(1) No. 25	vs. (8) VCU; Quarterfinals	W 76–67	24–6	18 – Dowtin	8 – Robinson	5 – Garrett	Capital One Arena (7,321); Washington, D.C.
Mar 10, 2018; 1:00 pm, CBSSN	(1) No. 25	vs. (4) Saint Joseph's; Semifinals	W 90–87	25–6	18 – Berry	9 – Berry	10 – Dowtin	Capital One Arena (8,756); Washington, D.C.
Mar 11, 2018; 1:00 pm, CBS	(1) No. 25	vs. (3) Davidson; Championship	L 57–58	25–7	20 – Matthews	8 – Matthews	4 – Garrett	Capital One Arena (7,643); Washington, D.C.
NCAA tournament
Mar 15, 2018*; 12:15 pm, CBS	(7 MW)	vs. (10 MW) Oklahoma; First Round	W 83–78 ^{OT}	26–7	16 – Matthews	10 – Langevine	5 – Terrell	PPG Paints Arena (18,757); Pittsburgh, PA
Mar 17, 2018*; 2:40 pm, CBS	(7 MW)	vs. (2 MW) No. 9 Duke; Second Round	L 62–87	26–8	23 – Matthews	8 – Berry	9 – Dowtin	PPG Paints Arena (19,015); Pittsburgh, PA
*Non-conference game. ^{#}Rankings from AP Poll. (#) Tournament seedings in parentheses. All times are in Eastern Time.

== Rankings ==
Ranking movements Legend: ██ Increase in ranking ██ Decrease in ranking RV = Received votes
	Week																			
Poll	Pre	1	2	3	4	5	6	7	8	9	10	11	12	13	14	15	16	17	18	Final
AP	RV	RV	RV	RV	RV	RV	RV	RV	RV	RV	RV	24	22	18	16	18	17	25	RV	Not released
Coaches	RV	RV	RV	RV	RV	RV	RV	RV	RV	RV	RV	23	21	19	14	18	16	24	22	RV

*AP does not release post-NCAA tournament rankings

== See also ==
- 2017–18 Rhode Island Rams women's basketball team
