= 2014–15 Rhode Island Rams men's basketball team =

American college basketball season

2014–15 Rhode Island Rams men's basketball

NIT, Second round
- Conference: Atlantic 10 Conference
- Record: 23–10 (13–5 A-10)
- Head coach: Dan Hurley (3rd season)
- Assistant coaches: David Cox; Luke Murray; Jim Carr
- Home arena: Ryan Center

2014–15 Atlantic 10 men's basketball standings
| | Conf. | | | | Overall |
| Team | W | | L | PCT | W | | L | PCT |
|---|---|---|---|---|---|---|---|---|
| Davidson | 14 | – | 4 | .778 | 24 | – | 8 | .750 |
| Dayton | 13 | – | 5 | .722 | 27 | – | 9 | .750 |
| Rhode Island | 13 | – | 5 | .722 | 23 | – | 10 | .697 |
| VCU † | 12 | – | 6 | .667 | 26 | – | 10 | .722 |
| Richmond | 12 | – | 6 | .667 | 21 | – | 14 | .600 |
| George Washington | 10 | – | 8 | .556 | 22 | – | 13 | .629 |
| St. Bonaventure | 10 | – | 8 | .556 | 18 | – | 13 | .581 |
| UMass | 10 | – | 8 | .556 | 17 | – | 15 | .531 |
| La Salle | 8 | – | 10 | .444 | 17 | – | 16 | .515 |
| Saint Joseph's | 7 | – | 11 | .389 | 13 | – | 18 | .419 |
| Duquesne | 6 | – | 12 | .333 | 12 | – | 19 | .387 |
| Fordham | 4 | – | 14 | .222 | 10 | – | 21 | .323 |
| George Mason | 4 | – | 14 | .222 | 9 | – | 22 | .290 |
| Saint Louis | 3 | – | 15 | .167 | 11 | – | 21 | .344 |
† 2015 A10 tournament winner Rankings from AP poll

The 2014–15 Rhode Island Rams basketball team represented the University of Rhode Island during the 2014–15 NCAA Division I men's basketball season. The Rams, led by third year head coach Dan Hurley, played their home games at the Ryan Center and were members of the Atlantic 10 Conference. They finished the season 23–10, 13–5 in A-10 play to finish in a tie for second place. They advanced to the semifinals of the A-10 tournament where they lost to Dayton. They were invited to the National Invitation Tournament where they defeated Iona in the first round before losing in the second round to Stanford.

== Previous season ==
The Rams finished the season with an overall record of 14–18, with a record of 5–11 in the Atlantic 10 regular season to finish in a tie for tenth place. In the 2014 Atlantic 10 tournament, the Rams were defeated by Massachusetts in the second round.

== Off season ==
=== Departures ===
| Name | Number | Pos. | Height | Weight | Year | Hometown | Notes |
|---|---|---|---|---|---|---|---|
| Mike Powell | 1 | G | 5'11 | 175 | Junior | Chicago, IL | Transfer |
| Xavier Munford | 5 | G | 6'2" | 180 | Senior | Hillside, NJ | Graduated |
| Jonathan Nazarko | 22 | G | 6'2" | 200 | Senior | East Lyme, CT | Graduated |
| Mike Aaman | 34 | F | 6'8" | 210 | Sophomore | Hazlet, NJ | Assaulted in off-campus incident |

=== Incoming transfers ===
| Name | Number | Pos. | Height | Weight | Year | Hometown | Previous School |
|---|---|---|---|---|---|---|---|
| Earl Watson | 33 | F | 6'7" | 240 | Junior | Fort Pierce, FL | Chipola College |

== Incoming recruits ==
College recruiting
| Name | Hometown | School | Height | Weight | Commit date |
|---|---|---|---|---|---|
| Jarvis Garrett; PG | Milwaukee, WI | Notre Dame Prep | 6 ft 0 in (1.83 m) | 170 lb (77 kg) | Feb 25, 2014 |
| Jarvis Garrett; PG | Recruit ratings: Scout: Rivals: (66) | | | | |
Overall recruit ranking:
Note: In many cases, Scout, Rivals, 247Sports, On3, and ESPN may conflict in their listings of height and weight.; In these cases, the average was taken. ESPN grades are on a 100-point scale.; Sources: "2014 Team Ranking". Rivals.

== Roster ==
2014–15 Rhode Island Rams men's basketball team
Players
Coaches

| Pos. | # | Name | Height | Weight | Year | Previous school | Hometown |
|---|---|---|---|---|---|---|---|
| G | 0 | E. C. Matthews | 6 ft 5 in (1.96 m) | 190 lb (86 kg) | So | Romulus | Detroit, MI |
| G | 1 | Jarvis Garrett | 6 ft 0 in (1.83 m) | 175 lb (79 kg) | Fr | Notre Dame Prep | Milwaukee, WI |
| F | 2 | Jarelle Reischel | 6 ft 6 in (1.98 m) | 215 lb (98 kg) | RS Jr | Point Pleasant Beach; Rice | Frankfurt, Germany |
| F | 4 | Jordan Hare | 6 ft 10 in (2.08 m) | 205 lb (93 kg) | Jr | Arthur Hill | Saginaw, MI |
| G | 10 | Biggie Minnis | 6 ft 3 in (1.91 m) | 200 lb (91 kg) | RS Jr | Atlantic Christian; Texas Tech | Philadelphia, PA |
| G | 11 | Matthew Butler | 6 ft 2 in (1.88 m) | 200 lb (91 kg) | So | Memphis East | Memphis, TN |
| F | 12 | Hassan Martin | 6 ft 7 in (2.01 m) | 210 lb (95 kg) | So | Curtis | Staten Island, NY |
| G | 13 | T. J. Buchanan | 6 ft 3 in (1.91 m) | 195 lb (88 kg) | Sr | Kalamazoo Central | Kalamazoo, MI |
| F | 14 | Ifeanyi Onyekaba | 6 ft 8 in (2.03 m) | 240 lb (109 kg) | Jr | Virginia Episcopal School | Abuja, Nigeria |
| G | 20 | Eric Youncofski (W) | 5 ft 10 in (1.78 m) | 150 lb (68 kg) | Jr | Middletown North | Middletown, NJ |
| G | 22 | Rory Temkin (W) | 6 ft 3 in (1.91 m) | 190 lb (86 kg) | Jr | Bishop Hendricken | Narragansett, RI |
| G | 30 | Shane Plunkett (W) | 6 ft 3 in (1.91 m) | 195 lb (88 kg) | Jr | Long Island Lutheran | Brookville, NY |
| G | 32 | Jared Terrell | 6 ft 3 in (1.91 m) | 220 lb (100 kg) | Fr | Brewster Academy | Weymouth, MA |
| F | 33 | Earl Watson | 6 ft 7 in (2.01 m) | 250 lb (113 kg) | Jr | Chipola College | Fort Pierce, FL |
| F | 55 | Gilvydas Biruta | 6 ft 8 in (2.03 m) | 245 lb (111 kg) | RS Sr | Saint Benedict's Prep; Rutgers | Jonava, Lithuania |

Head coach

- Dan Hurley (Seton Hall)

Assistant coach(es)

- David Cox (William & Mary)
- Jim Carr (York College)
- Luke Murray (Fairfield)

Legend

- (C) Team captain
- (S) Suspended
- (I) Ineligible
- (W) Walk-on
- Injured
- Current redshirt

Roster

== Schedule ==
| Date time, TV | Rank^{#} | Opponent^{#} | Result | Record | Site (attendance) city, state |
Non-conference regular season
| 11/14/2014*; 7:00 pm, OSN | | Pace | W 94–54 | 1–0 | Ryan Center (4,210); Kingston, RI |
| 11/16/2014*; 2:00 pm, OSN | | UMass Lowell | W 72–56 | 2–0 | Ryan Center (4,320); Kingston, RI |
| 11/22/2014*; 7:00 pm, OSN | | No. 21 Nebraska | W 66–62 ^{OT} | 3–0 | Ryan Center (7,657); Kingston, RI |
| 11/27/2014*; 2:00 pm, ESPN2 | | vs. No. 11 Kansas; Orlando Classic quarterfinals | L 60–76 | 3–1 | HP Field House (3,915); Lake Buena Vista, FL |
| 11/28/2014*; 2:30 pm, ESPNU | | vs. Santa Clara; Orlando Classic consolation round | W 66–44 | 4–1 | HP Field House (4,383); Lake Buena Vista, FL |
| 11/30/2014*; 6:30 pm, ESPNU | | vs. Georgia Tech; Orlando Classic 5th place game | L 61–64 | 4–2 | HP Field House (4,842); Lake Buena Vista, FL |
| 12/06/2014*; 8:00 pm | | at Southern Miss | W 75–43 | 5–2 | Reed Green Coliseum (3,156); Hattiesburg, MS |
| 12/10/2014*; 7:00 pm, FS2 | | at Providence; Ocean State Cup | L 60–68 | 5–3 | Dunkin' Donuts Center (12,246); Providence, RI |
| 12/13/2014*; 2:00 pm, OSN | | Delaware State | W 83–44 | 6–3 | Ryan Center (4,613); Kingston, RI |
| 12/20/2014*; 4:00 pm, OSN | | Detroit | W 69–55 | 7–3 | Ryan Center (4,694); Kingston, RI |
| 12/31/2014*; 4:00 pm, OSN | | Brown; Ocean State Cup | W 80–60 | 8–3 | Ryan Center (5,015); Kingston, RI |
Atlantic 10 regular season
| 01/03/2015; 3:00 pm, NBCSN | | at Saint Louis | W 65–53 | 9–3 (1–0) | Chaifetz Arena (8,677); St. Louis, MO |
| 01/07/2015; 7:00 pm | | Fordham | W 68–65 | 10–3 (2–0) | Ryan Center (4,810); Kingston, RI |
| 01/10/2015; 1:00 pm | | at Duquesne | W 61–60 | 11–3 (3–0) | Palumbo Center (2,309); Pittsburgh, PA |
| 01/13/2015; 7:30 pm, CBSSN | | No. 17 VCU | L 60–65 | 11–4 (3–1) | Ryan Center (6,011); Kingston, RI |
| 01/17/2015; 2:30 pm, NBCSN | | at Massachusetts | L 56–60 | 11–5 (3–2) | Mullins Center (5,273); Amherst, MA |
| 01/22/2015; 7:00 pm, OSN | | La Salle | W 59–47 | 12–5 (4–2) | Ryan Center (4,481); Kingston, RI |
| 01/25/2015; 2:00 pm, OSN | | St. Bonaventure | W 53–48 | 13–5 (5–2) | Ryan Center (5,312); Kingston, RI |
| 01/28/2015; 7:00 pm | | at Fordham | W 64–63 | 14–5 (6–2) | Rose Hill Gymnasium (1,622); Bronx, NY |
| 01/31/2015; 2:00 pm, OSN | | George Washington | W 59–55 | 15–5 (7–2) | Ryan Center (7,097); Kingston, RI |
| 02/08/2015; 2:30 pm, NBCSN | | at Richmond | W 79–74 | 16–5 (8–2) | Robins Center (7,201); Richmond, VA |
| 02/11/2015; 7:00 pm | | at Saint Joseph's | L 64–65 | 16–6 (8–3) | Hagan Arena (3,681); Philadelphia, PA |
| 02/14/2015; 2:00 pm, OSN | | Saint Louis | W 81–68 | 17–6 (9–3) | Ryan Center (5,314); Kingston, RI |
| 02/18/2015; 7:00 pm, SNY | | Massachusetts | W 75–59 | 18–6 (10–3) | Ryan Center (7,118); Kingston, RI |
| 02/21/2015; 4:00 pm | | at George Mason | W 71–56 | 19–6 (11–3) | Patriot Center (4,740); Fairfax, VA |
| 02/25/2015; 7:00 pm, OSN | | Davidson | L 59–60 | 19–7 (11–4) | Ryan Center (6,050); Kingston, RI |
| 02/28/2015; 12:30 pm, NBCSN | | at La Salle | W 59–56 | 20–7 (12–4) | Tom Gola Arena (2,286); Philadelphia, PA |
| 03/03/2015; 7:00 pm, CBSSN | | at Dayton | L 59–75 | 20–8 (12–5) | UD Arena (13,455); Dayton, OH |
| 03/07/2015; 2:00 pm, OSN | | Saint Joseph's | W 78–68 | 21–8 (13–5) | Ryan Center (7,121); Kingston, RI |
Atlantic 10 tournament
| 03/13/2015; 9:00 pm, NBCSN | | vs. George Washington; Quarterfinals | W 71–58 | 22–8 | Barclays Center (7,423); Brooklyn, NY |
| 03/14/2015; 4:00 pm, CBSSN | | vs. Dayton; Semifinals | L 52–56 | 22–9 | Barclays Center (8,488); Brooklyn, NY |
NIT
| 03/17/2015*; 7:00 pm, ESPNU | No. (3) | (6) Iona; First round | W 88–75 | 23–9 | Ryan Center (2,638); Kingston, RI |
| 03/22/2015*; 9:30 pm, ESPNU | No. (3) | at (2) Stanford; Second round | L 65–74 | 23–10 | Maples Pavilion (1,235); Stanford, CA |
*Non-conference game. ^{#}Rankings from AP Poll. (#) Tournament seedings in parentheses. All times are in Eastern Time. (#) during NIT is seed within region.

== See also ==
- 2014–15 Rhode Island Rams women's basketball team
