= Never Forget Tribute Classic =

Multi-team basketball event in New Jersey, U.S.

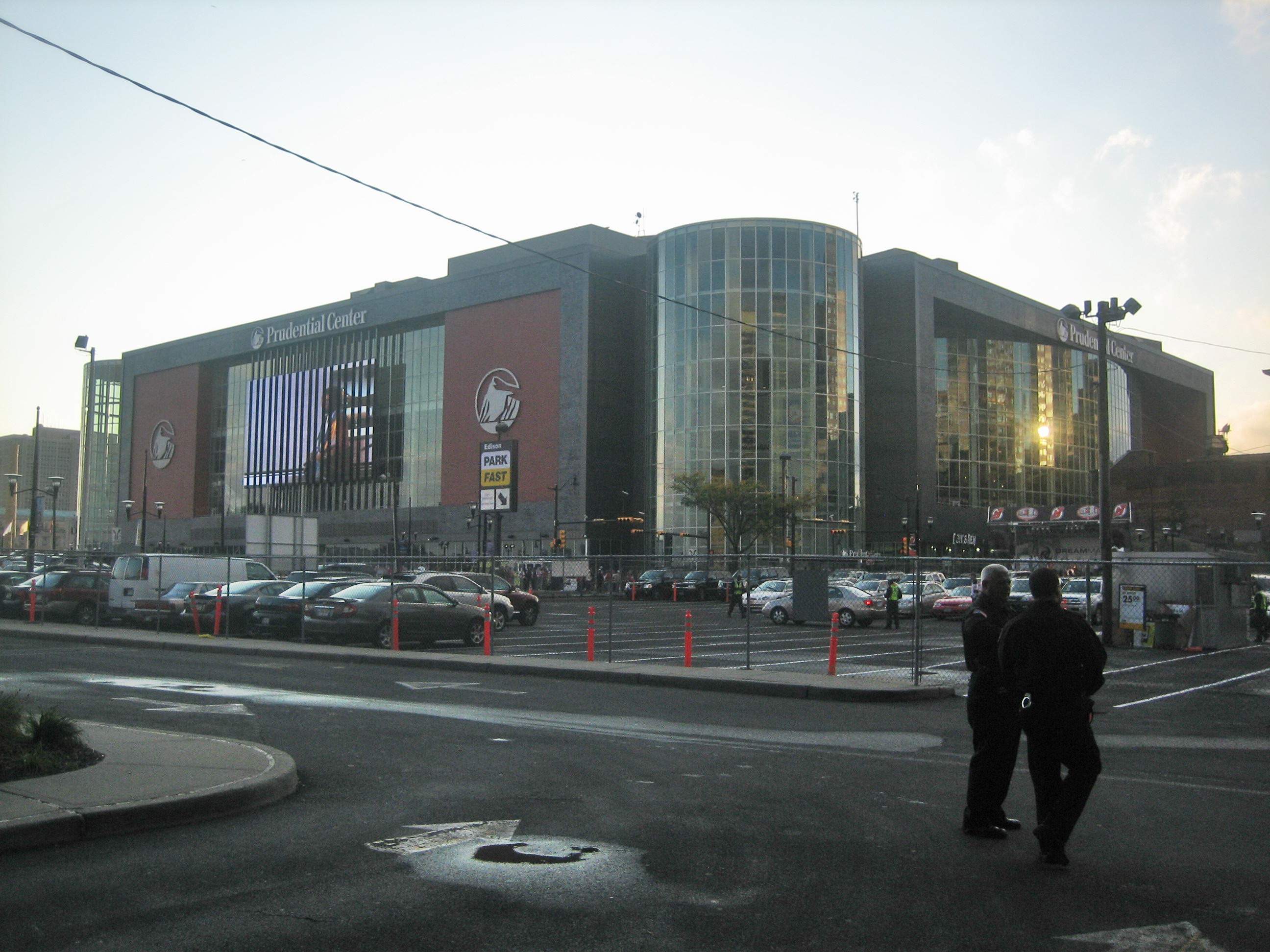
The Prudential Center where the event takes place

The Never Forget Tribute Classic is a college basketball series that began during the 2016–17 season as it has been held at the Prudential Center in Newark, New Jersey since the beginning.

The event partners with the Families of Freedom Scholarship Fund, which helps support the education of children of the victims of the September 11 terrorist attacks.

== Yearly participants ==
Appearances	Team	Record
3	Villanova	3–0
2	Mississippi State	2–0
2	Connecticut (men)	1–1
1	Houston	1–0
1	Pittsburgh	1–0
1	Florida	1–0
1	Seton Hall	1–0
1	Florida State	1–0
1	Connecticut (women)	1–0
1	Princeton	1–0
1	Notre Dame	0–1
1	Penn State	0–1
1	Cincinnati	0–1
1	VCU	0–1
1	Delaware	0–1
1	Kansas State	0–1
1	Clemson	0–1
1	St. Bonaventure	0–1
1	UCLA (women)	0–1
1	Boston College	0–1
1	Rutgers	0–1
1	Arkansas	0–1

== Game results ==
Date	Winning team		Losing team		Attendance	TV
December 10, 2016	No. 1 Villanova	74	No. 23 Notre Dame	66	18,722	CBS
December 10, 2016	Pittsburgh	81	Penn State	73	16,165	CBSSN
December 9, 2017	No. 19 Seton Hall	90	VCU	67		FOX
December 9, 2017	No. 5 Florida	66	No. 17 Cincinnati	60	9,112	ESPN2
December 8, 2018	No. 11 Florida State	79	UConn	71	7,142	ESPN2
December 8, 2018	No. 22 Mississippi State	82	Clemson	71	7,142	ESPN2
December 14, 2019	Mississippi State	67	Kansas State	63		ESPNU
December 14, 2019	No. 20 Villanova	78	Delaware	70	7,236	ESPN2
December 11, 2021	No. 3 Connecticut (women)	71	UCLA (women)	61	9,236	ABC
December 11, 2021	No. 15 Connecticut (men)	74	St. Bonaventure	64		ESPN2
December 10, 2022	Villanova	77	Boston College	56	9,437	FOX
December 21, 2024	Princeton	83	Rutgers	82	10,148	FS1
December 20, 2025	No. 8 Houston	94	No. 14 Arkansas	85	6,246	CBS
