= Marcus Santos-Silva =

American basketball player (born 1997)

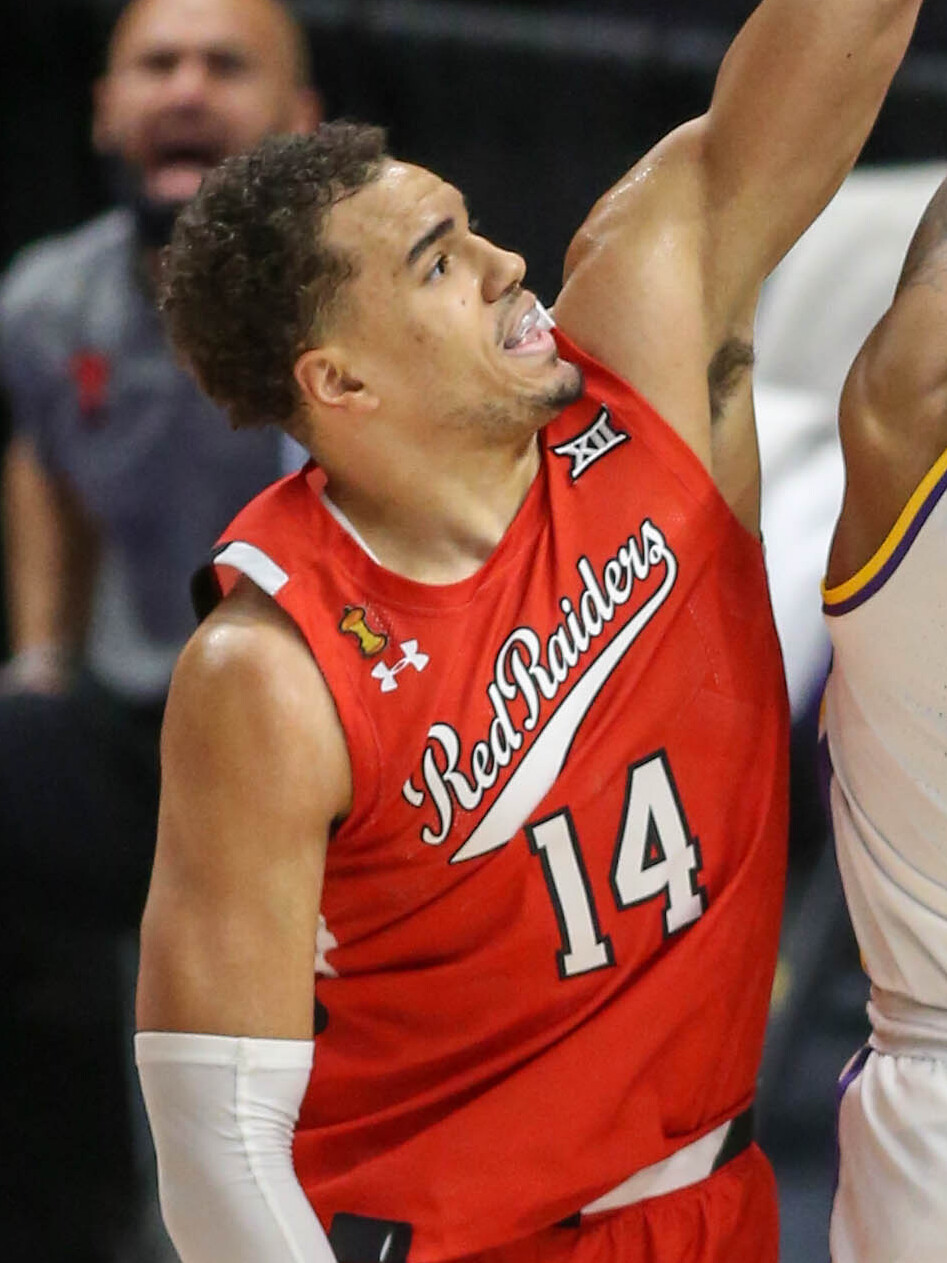
- Santos-Silva with Texas Tech in 2021

No. 7 – Forlì 2.015
- Position: Power forward
- League: Serie A2

Personal information
- Born: June 7, 1997 (age 29) Boston, Massachusetts, U.S.
- Listed height: 2.01 m (6 ft 7 in)
- Listed weight: 113 kg (249 lb)

Career information
- High school: Taunton (Taunton, Massachusetts); Bridgewater-Raynham (Bridgewater, Massachusetts); Vermont Academy (Saxtons River, Vermont)
- College: VCU (2017–2020); Texas Tech (2020–2021)
- NBA draft: 2021: undrafted
- Playing career: 2023–present

Career history
- 2023–2024: Lille Métropole
- 2024–2025: Saint-Quentin
- 2025–2026: ERA Nymburk
- 2026–present: Forlì 2.015

Marcus Santos-Silva
Profile
- Position: Tight end

Career information
- High school: Taunton (Taunton, Massachusetts); Bridgewater-Raynham (Bridgewater, Massachusetts); Vermont Academy (Saxtons River, Vermont)
- College: VCU (2017–2020); Texas Tech (2020–2022)
- NFL draft: 2022: undrafted

Career history
- Cleveland Browns (2022)*; San Antonio Brahmas (2023)*
- * Offseason or practice squad member only

Marcus Santos-Silva (born June 7, 1997) is an American professional basketball player for Pallacanestro Forlì 2.015 of the Italian Serie A2. He previously played college basketball and college football for Texas Tech and VCU.

== Early life ==
Growing up, Santos-Silva played tight end on the gridiron and preferred football to basketball. During his freshman season at Taunton High School, he decided to focus on basketball after he had a growth spurt and defenders began targeting his knees. Following his sophomore season, Santos-Silva transferred to Bridgewater-Raynham Regional High School. He transferred again to Vermont Academy and repeated his junior year. As a senior, Santos-Silva was named to the Lakes Region all-conference team, helping the team finish 19–11. He committed to VCU over offers from Kansas State, Boston College and Temple, among others.

== College career ==
As a freshman at VCU, Santos-Silva averaged 3.1 points and 3 rebounds per game. During the offseason, he greatly worked on expanding his game, particularly his shooting and conditioning and lost 30 pounds over the summer. In the Atlantic 10 Tournament, Santos-Silva contributed 26 points and 22 rebounds in a quarterfinal loss to Rhode Island, VCU's first 20 and 20 game since Kendrick Warren in 1991. He was named to the Atlantic 10 All-Tournament Team and helped the Rams reach the NCAA Tournament. Santos-Silva averaged 10 points and 7.4 rebounds per game as a sophomore. During the summer, Santos-Silva focused on his rebounding and adding a mid-range shot. On January 5, 2020, he tied his career high with 26 points and grabbed 12 rebounds in a 72–59 win against George Mason. As a junior, Santos-Silva averaged 12.8 points, 8.9 rebounds and 1.3 blocks per game, while shooting 56.9 percent from the floor. Following the season, he decided to transfer to Texas Tech as a graduate transfer. He finished his bachelor's degree in Homeland Security and Emergency Preparedness in the summer of 2020, and was eligible for Texas Tech immediately.

Santos-Silva was named the preseason Big 12 Conference newcomer of the year. In his Texas Tech debut on November 25, Santos-Silva finished with 10 points and 12 rebounds in a 101–58 win against Northwestern State. He averaged 8.3 points and 6.4 rebounds per game. Following the season he announced that he was returning to Texas Tech for his fifth season of eligibility.

=== Statistics ===
Legend
GP	Games played	GS	Games started	MPG	Minutes per game
FG%	Field goal percentage	3P%	3-point field goal percentage	FT%	Free throw percentage
RPG	Rebounds per game	APG	Assists per game	SPG	Steals per game
BPG	Blocks per game	PPG	Points per game	**Bold**	Career high

=== College ===
Year	Team	GP	GS	MPG	FG%	3P%	FT%	RPG	APG	SPG	BPG	PPG
2017–18	VCU	**33**	0	9.8	.535	–	.400	3.0	.3	.1	.5	3.1
2018–19	VCU	**33**	**33**	22.2	**.594**	–	**.597**	7.4	.7	.8	1.1	10.0
2019–20	VCU	31	31	**27.2**	.569	–	.551	**8.9**	.9	**1.1**	**1.3**	**12.8**
2020–21	Texas Tech	29	29	23.6	.531	.000	.578	6.4	**1.3**	.7	1.1	8.3
Career		126	93	20.5	.563	.000	.561	6.4	.8	.7	1.0	8.5

== Professional football career ==
=== Cleveland Browns ===
Santos-Silva signed with the Cleveland Browns as an undrafted free agent on May 2, 2022, to play tight end. He was waived on August 22, 2022.

=== San Antonio Brahmas ===
The San Antonio Brahmas selected him in the 15th round of the 2023 XFL Supplemental Draft on January 1, 2023.

== Personal life ==
Santos-Silva is the son of Louie Silva and Jackie Santos-Silva. He is a fan of the Boston Celtics.
