= 2017–18 Atlantic 10 Conference men's basketball season =

- League: NCAA Division I
- Sport: Basketball
- Teams: 14
- TV partner(s): CBSSN, NBCSN, CBS

Regular season
- Season champions: Rhode Island
- Season MVP: Jaylen Adams, St. Bonaventure & Peyton Aldridge, Davidson

Tournament
- Champions: Davidson
- Runners-up: Rhode Island

Atlantic 10 men's basketball seasons
- 2016–17 2018–19

2017–18 Atlantic 10 men's basketball standings
	Conf.				Overall
Team	W		L	PCT	W		L	PCT
Rhode Island	15	–	3	.833	26	–	8	.765
St. Bonaventure	14	–	4	.778	26	–	8	.765
Davidson †	13	–	5	.722	21	–	12	.636
Saint Joseph's	10	–	8	.556	16	–	16	.500
VCU	9	–	9	.500	18	–	15	.545
Saint Louis	9	–	9	.500	17	–	16	.515
George Mason	9	–	9	.500	16	–	17	.485
Richmond	9	–	9	.500	12	–	20	.375
Dayton	8	–	10	.444	14	–	17	.452
Duquesne	7	–	11	.389	16	–	16	.500
George Washington	7	–	11	.389	15	–	18	.455
La Salle	7	–	11	.389	13	–	19	.406
Massachusetts	5	–	13	.278	13	–	20	.394
Fordham	4	–	14	.222	9	–	22	.290
† 2018 A10 Tournament winner Rankings from AP poll

The 2017–18 Atlantic 10 Conference men's basketball season was the 42nd season of Atlantic 10 Conference basketball. The season began with practices in October 2017, followed by the start of the 2017–18 NCAA Division I men's basketball season in November. League play began in late December and ended on March 3, 2018.

With a win over La Salle on February 20, 2018, Rhode Island clinched at least a share of the A-10 regular season championship, their first title since 1981. Three days later, the Rams clinched an outright A-10 title for the first time in school history.

The Atlantic-10 tournament was held at the Capital One Arena in Washington, D.C. from March 7 through 11, 2018. Davidson defeated Rhode Island in the championship game to win the tournament and, as a result, received the conference's automatic bid to the NCAA tournament. Rhode Island and St. Bonaventure received at large bids to the NCAA tournament. The schools went a combined 2–3 in the tournament.

== Head coaches ==
=== Coaching changes ===
George Washington head coach Mike Lonergan was fired on September 17, 2016, after the school concluded a two-month investigation into alleged emotional abuse against his players. Maurice Joseph was named interim head coach on September 27. On March 27, 2017, the school removed the interim tag and named Maurice Joseph full-time head coach.

On March 9, 2017, UMass fired head coach Derek Kellogg after nine years and a 155–137 record. On March 31, the school announced they had hired Chattanooga head coach Matt McCall.

Will Wade left VCU to take the head coaching position at LSU following the firing of Johnny Jones. On March 21, 2017 the school hired Rice head coach Mike Rhoades, who had served as associate head coach under Shaka Smart from 2009–2014.

Duquesne fired head coach Jim Ferry on March 13, 2017 after five seasons. The school then hired Akron head coach Keith Dambrot on March 28. Dambrot had a 305-139 record in his 13 years as the Akron head coach.

On March 25, 2017, Dayton head coach Archie Miller left the school to accept the head coaching position at Indiana. The school hired Dayton alum Anthony Grant as the new head coach on March 30.

=== Coaches ===
Team	Head coach	Previous job	Seasons at school	Overall record	A-10 record	A-10 Championships	NCAA tournaments	NCAA Final Fours	NCAA Championships
Davidson	Bob McKillop	Long Island Lutheran High School	29	554–330 (.627)	45–27 (.625)	1	9	0	0
Dayton	Anthony Grant	Oklahoma City Thunder (asst.)	1	14–17 (.452)	8–10 (.444)	0	0	0	0
Duquesne	Keith Dambrot	Akron	1	16–16 (.500)	7–11 (.389)	0	3	0	0
Fordham	Jeff Neubauer	Eastern Kentucky	3	39–55 (.415)	19–33 (.365)	0	0	0	0
George Mason	Dave Paulsen	Bucknell	3	47–52 (.475)	23–30 (.434)	0	0	0	0
George Washington	Maurice Joseph	George Washington (asst.)	2	35–33 (.515)	17–19 (.472)	0	0	0	0
La Salle	John Giannini	Maine	14	212–226 (.484)	99–131 (.430)	0	1	0	0
UMass	Matt McCall	Chattanooga	1	13–20 (.394)	5–13 (.278)	0	1	0	0
Rhode Island	Dan Hurley	Wagner	6	113–82 (.579)	58–46 (.558)	1	2	0	0
Richmond	Chris Mooney	Air Force	13	237–195 (.549)	118–97 (.549)	0	2	0	0
Saint Joseph's	Phil Martelli	Saint Joseph's (asst.)	23	430–309 (.582)	212–164 (.564)	6	7	0	0
Saint Louis	Travis Ford	Oklahoma State	2	29–37 (.439)	15–21 (.417)	0	0	0	0
St. Bonaventure	Mark Schmidt	Robert Morris	11	192–152 (.558)	95–89 (.516)	1	2	0	0
VCU	Mike Rhoades	Rice	1	18–15 (.545)	9–9 (.500)	0	0	0	0

Notes:

- All records, appearances, titles, etc. are from time with current school only.
- Overall and A-10 records are from time at current school and include the 2017–18 season.

== Preseason ==
=== Preseason poll ===
Prior to the season at the conference's annual media day, awards and a poll were chosen by a panel of the league's head coaches and select media members.

Rank	Team
1	Rhode Island (27)
2	St. Bonaventure (1)
3	Saint Joseph's
4	VCU
5	Dayton
6	Davidson
7	Saint Louis
8	Richmond
9	La Salle
10	George Mason
11	George Washington
12	Massachusetts
13	Fordham
14	Duquesne
(first place votes)

=== Preseason All-Conference Teams ===
Award	Recipients
Preseason All-Atlantic 10 First Team	Peyton Aldridge, Davidson
Preseason All-Atlantic 10 First Team	E. C. Matthews, Rhode Island
Preseason All-Atlantic 10 First Team	Jaylen Adams, St. Bonaventure
Preseason All-Atlantic 10 First Team	Matt Mobley, St. Bonaventure
Preseason All-Atlantic 10 First Team	Justin Tillman, VCU
Preseason All-Atlantic 10 Second Team	Yuta Watanabe, George Washington
Preseason All-Atlantic 10 Second Team	B. J. Johnson, La Salle
Preseason All-Atlantic 10 Second Team	Jared Terrell, Rhode Island
Preseason All-Atlantic 10 Second Team	De'Monte Buckingham, Richmond
Preseason All-Atlantic 10 Second Team	Shavar Newkirk, Saint Joseph's
Preseason All-Atlantic 10 Third Team	Mike Lewis II, Duquesne
Preseason All-Atlantic 10 Third Team	Joseph Chartouny, Fordham
Preseason All-Atlantic 10 Third Team	Otis Livingston II, George Mason
Preseason All-Atlantic 10 Third Team	Charlie Brown, Jr., Saint Joseph's
Preseason All-Atlantic 10 Third Team	Lamarr Kimble, Saint Joseph's

== Regular season ==
=== Early season tournaments ===
Team	Tournament	Finish
Davidson	Diamond Head Classic	7th
Dayton	Charleston Classic	6th
George Mason	Cancun Challenge	4th
George Washington	Las Vegas Invitational	4th
La Salle	Hall of Fame Tip Off	4th
UMass	Barclays Center Classic	0–2
Rhode Island	NIT Season Tip-Off	2nd
Richmond	Cayman Islands Classic	4th
Saint Joseph's	Wooden Legacy	7th
Saint Louis	2K Sports Classic	2nd
St. Bonaventure	Emerald Coast Classic	2nd
VCU	Maui Invitational	6th

=== Conference matrix ===
This table summarizes the head-to-head results between teams in conference play. Each team played 18 conference games: one game vs. eight opponents and two games against five opponents.

	Davidson	Dayton	Duquesne	Fordham	GM	GW	La Salle	UMass	Rhode Island	Richmond	St. Joseph's	St. Louis	St. Bonaventure	VCU
vs. Davidson	–	1–0	0–1	0–2	0–1	0–2	0–1	0–1	1–1	2–0	0–1	0–1	1–1	0–1
vs. Dayton	0–1	–	1–1	0–1	1–0	0–1	1–0	2–0	2–0	0–1	1–0	1–1	0–1	1–1
vs. Duquesne	1–0	1–1	–	1–1	0–1	0–2	0–1	1–0	1–0	1–0	1–0	1–1	2–0	1–0
vs. Fordham	2–0	1–0	1–1	–	0–1	1–0	2–0	0–1	1–0	0–1	2–0	1–0	1–0	2–0
vs. George Mason	1–0	0–1	1–0	1–0	–	1–1	1–0	0–2	1–0	1–1	0–2	0–1	1–0	1–1
vs. George Washington	2–0	1–0	2–0	0–1	1–1	–	0–1	0–1	1–0	1–1	0–1	1–0	1–0	1–1
vs. La Salle	1–0	0–1	1–0	0–2	0–1	1–0	–	1–1	2–0	1–0	1–1	1–1	1–0	1–0
vs. UMass	1–0	0–2	0–1	1–0	2–0	1–0	1–1	–	2–0	1–0	1–1	1–0	1–0	1–0
vs. Rhode Island	1–1	0–2	0–1	0–1	0–1	0–1	0–2	0–2	–	0–1	1–0	0–1	1–1	0–1
vs. Richmond	0–2	1–0	0–1	1–0	1–1	1–1	0–1	0–1	1–0	–	1–0	2–0	1–0	0–2
vs. Saint Joseph's	1–0	0–1	0–1	0–2	2–0	1–0	1–1	1–1	0–1	0–1	–	1–0	1–1	0–1
vs. Saint Louis	1–0	1–1	1–1	0–1	1–0	0–1	1–1	0–1	1–0	0–2	0–1	–	2–0	1–0
vs. St. Bonaventure	1–1	1–0	0–2	0–1	0–1	0–1	0–1	0–1	1–1	0–1	1–1	0–2	–	0–1
vs. VCU	1–0	1–1	0–1	0–2	1–1	1–1	0–1	0–1	1–0	2–0	1–0	0–1	1–0	–
Total	13–5	8–10	7–11	4–14	9–9	6–10	7–11	7–11	15–3	9–9	10–8	9–9	14–4	9–9

== Conference Awards ==
On March 6, 2018, the Atlantic 10 announced its conference awards.

Award	Recipients
Coach of the Year	Dan Hurley, Rhode Island
Player of the Year	Peyton Aldridge, Davidson Jaylen Adams, St. Bonaventure
Defensive Player of the Year	Yuta Watanabe, George Washington
Rookie of the Year	Kellan Grady, Davidson
Chris Daniels Most Improved Player of the Year	Luwane Pipkins, Massachusetts LaDarien Griffin, St. Bonaventure
Sixth Man of the Year	Tarin Smith, Duquesne
First Team	Peyton Aldridge, Davidson Jared Terrell, Rhode Island Jaylen Adams, St. Bonaventure Matt Mobley, St. Bonaventure Justin Tillman, VCU
Second Team	Kellan Grady, Davidson Otis Livingston II, George Mason B. J. Johnson, La Salle Luwane Pipkins, Massachusetts Shavar Newkirk, Saint Joseph's
Third Team	Josh Cunningham, Dayton Yuta Watanabe, George Washington E. C. Matthews, Rhode Island Grant Golden, Richmond James Demery, Saint Joseph's
All-Academic Team	Joseph Chartouny, Fordham Prokop Slanina, Fordham Patrick Steeves, George Washington B. J. Johnson, La Salle Jeff Dowtin, Rhode Island
All-Defensive Team	Joseph Chartouny, Fordham Yuta Watanabe, George Washington Stanford Robinson, Rhode Island Javon Bess, Saint Louis Justin Tillman, VCU
All-Rookie Team	Kellan Grady, Davidson Jalen Crutcher, Dayton Eric Williams, Jr., Duquesne Grant Golden, Richmond Hasahn French, Saint Louis

== Postseason ==
=== 2018 A-10 tournament ===
First round Wednesday, March 7 Stadium
12	La Salle	67
13	Massachusetts	69
11	George Washington	78
14	Fordham	72

Second round Thursday, March 8 NBCSN
8	VCU	77
9	Dayton	72
5	George Mason	80
13	Massachusetts	75
7	Richmond	81
10	Duquesne	68
6	Saint Louis	70
11	George Washington	63

Quarterfinals; Friday, March 9 NBCSN
1	Rhode Island	76
8	VCU	67
4	Saint Joseph's	68
5	George Mason	49
2	St. Bonaventure	83
7	Richmond	77
3	Davidson	78
6	Saint Louis	60

Semifinals; Saturday, March 10; CBSSN
1	Rhode Island	90
4	Saint Joseph's	87
2	St. Bonaventure	70
3	Davidson	82

Championship; Sunday, March 11; CBS
1	Rhode Island	57
3	Davidson	58

* denotes overtime period

=== NCAA tournament ===
The winner of the Atlantic 10 tournament, Davidson, received the conference's automatic bid to the 2018 NCAA Division I men's basketball tournament. Two other conference school received at-large bids to the Tournament: Rhode Island and St. Bonaventure.

Seed	Region	School	First Four	First round	Second round	Sweet Sixteen	Elite Eight	Final Four	Championship
7	Midwest	Rhode Island	N/A	defeated (10) Oklahoma 83–78^{OT}	eliminated by (2) Duke 62–87				
11	South	St. Bonaventure	defeated (11) UCLA 65–58	eliminated by (6) Florida 62–77					
12	South	Davidson	N/A	eliminated by (5) Kentucky 73–78					
		W–L (%):	1–0 (1.000)	1–2 (.333)	0–1 (.000)	0–0 (–)	0–0 (–)	0–0 (–)	0–0 (–) Total: 2–3 (.400)
