= Tyson Wheeler =

American basketball player and coach

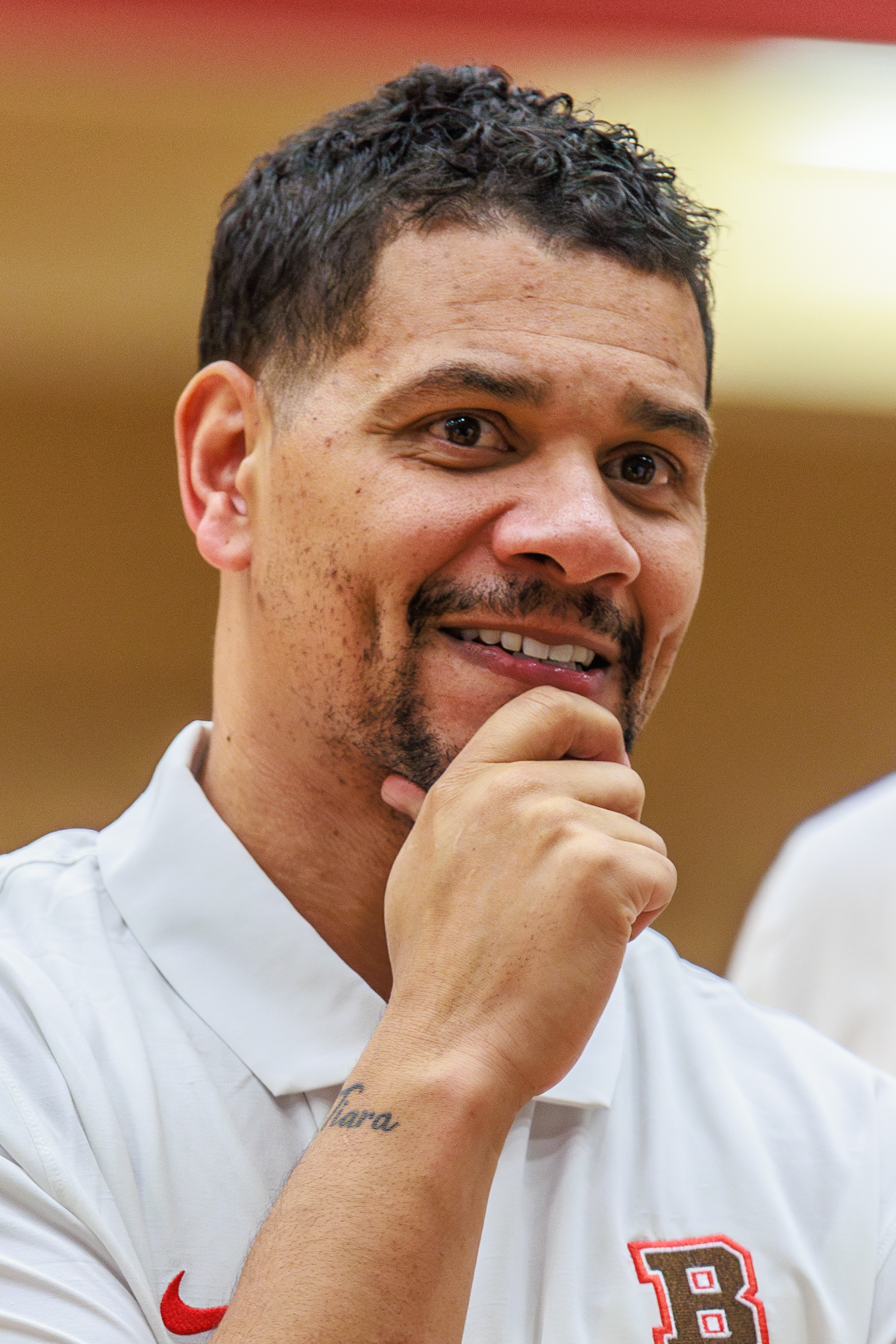
- Wheeler at Brown in 2024

Brown Bears
- Title: Assistant coach
- League: Ivy League

Personal information
- Born: October 8, 1975 (age 51) New Britain, Connecticut, U.S.
- Listed height: 5 ft 10 in (1.78 m)
- Listed weight: 165 lb (75 kg)

Career information
- High school: New London (New London, Connecticut)
- College: Rhode Island (1994–1998)
- NBA draft: 1998: 2nd round, 47th overall pick
- Drafted by: Toronto Raptors
- Playing career: 1998–2008
- Position: Point guard
- Number: 5
- Coaching career: 2010–present

Career history

Playing
- 1999: Fenerbahçe
- 1999: Denver Nuggets
- 1999–2000: Quad City Thunder
- 2000–2001: Los Angeles Stars
- 2001: Metropolitanos de Mauricio Baez
- 2001–2002: Bnei Herzliya
- 2002: Southern California Surf
- 2002–2003: Yakima Sun Kings
- 2003: Great Lakes Storm
- 2003–2004: Pallacanestro Cantù
- 2004–2005: Teramo Basket
- 2005–2006: BCM Gravelines
- 2006–2007: Le Mans Sarthe
- 2007: Benfica
- 2007–2008: APOEL
- 2008: CSU Asesoft Ploiești

Coaching
- 2010–2019: Fairfield (assistant)
- 2019–2022: UMass (assistant)
- 2022–present: Brown (assistant)

Career highlights
- All-CBA Second Team (2003); CBA assists leader (2003); 2× First-team All-Atlantic 10 (1997, 1998); Second-team All-Atlantic 10 (1996); Atlantic 10 All-Rookie Team (1995)
- Stats at NBA.com
- Stats at Basketball Reference

Tyson Aaron Wheeler (born October 8, 1975) is an American basketball coach and former player who is currently an assistant coach at Brown.

== College career ==
Wheeler played for Rhode Island from 1994 to 1998. Along with teammate Cuttino Mobley, Wheeler led the Rams to the Elite Eight in the 1998 NCAA Men's Division I Basketball Tournament. He would later be inducted into the school's ring of honor.

== Professional career ==
Wheeler was selected with the 18th pick of the 2nd round in the 1998 NBA draft by the Toronto Raptors. His NBA career consisted of one game with the Denver Nuggets in the lockout-shortened 1999 season, where he scored four points and had two assists in only three minutes of play. He later joined the Quad City Thunder in the Continental Basketball Association (CBA).

He played for the Great Lakes Storm of the CBA during the 2002–03 season and was named to the All-CBA Second Team.

== Coaching career ==
Wheeler was hired as an assistant coach at Brown in 2022 after more than a decade as an assistant at Fairfield and UMass.

== Personal life ==
In 2023, Wheeler's daughter Tiara was killed in a dirt bike accident in New London, Connecticut.
