= Keith Cothran =

American professional basketball player

Free agent
- Position: Guard

Personal information
- Born: March 26, 1986 (age 40) New Haven, Connecticut, U.S.
- Listed height: 6 ft 5 in (1.96 m)
- Listed weight: 195 lb (88 kg)

Career information
- High school: Hillhouse (New Haven, Connecticut); The Winchendon School (Winchendon, Massachusetts)
- College: Rhode Island (2006–2010)
- NBA draft: 2010: undrafted
- Playing career: 2010–present

Career history
- 2010–2011: Neckar L'Burg
- 2011–2012: Stjarnan
- 2012–2013: Petroleos
- 2013–2015: Fath Union Club
- 2015: Saint John Mill Rats

Keith Cothran (born March 26, 1986) is an American professional basketball player who last played for the Saint John Mill Rats of the National Basketball League of Canada (NBL). He played college basketball for Rhode Island.

== College career ==
He played college basketball for Rhode Island from 2006 to 2010. He averaged 14.3 points. 3.4 rebounds, 2.1 assists, and 1.7 steals per game as a senior. He was named MVP of the NIT semifinalist Rams as a senior.

== Professional career ==
After college, he tried out for the Boston Celtics and Atlanta Hawks. Cothran played professionally for Stjarnan in the Icelandic Úrvalsdeild in 2011–12. He averaged 15 points and five assists per game for Stjarnan. He later competed in Angola and Morocco. On January 19, 2015, he signed with the Mill Rats of NBL Canada.

== Personal life ==
At the age of 15, Cothran was arrested for gun possession while driving a stolen car with several friends. He was sentenced to 14 months in the Mount Saint John residential facility in Deep River, Connecticut. "He was a very quiet kid," said an assistant supervisor of the facility. "He was young, he stuck to himself. He stayed out of trouble here. He used to talk about the streets, his friends getting into a lot of trouble. He'd say, 'I don't want that life. I don't want to be in prison the rest of my life.'" It was at the facility that he developed an interest in basketball and went on to star at Hillhouse High School and The Winchendon School. Afterward, he spoke to juvenile offenders in the program, urging them to set high goals.

Cothran graduated from the University of Rhode Island in May 2010 with a degree in sociology. The New Haven Register called him an inspiration for troubled inner city children. Cothran said he was "at a loss for words" to receive his diploma because he was never strong academically.

On May 31, 2012 at 10:23 p.m, Cothran was sitting in a car near an empty parking lot in his hometown of New Haven, Connecticut when bullets were fired. He was not hit directly but was struck with a bullet in his forehead that ricocheted off the dashboard. After being struck, Cothran managed to go to a gas station across the street for help. It was unclear whether or not the shooting was related to the shooting death of Cothran's cousin in September 2011. He returned to playing basketball two weeks later.
