= Atlantic Christian School =

Christian school in Atlantic County, New Jersey, United States

Location
- 391 Zion Road; Egg Harbor Township, Atlantic County, New Jersey 08234; United States
- 39.3592°N 74.6356°W

Information
- Type: Christian school
- Established: 1971
- NCES School ID: 02043643
- Principal: Karen M. Oblen – Chief School Administrator; Margaret (Meg) McHale – Upper School Principal; Gail Alford – Elementary Principal and Director of Early Education
- Faculty: 43.5 FTEs
- Grades: PreK-12
- Enrollment: 555 (as of 2023–24)
- Student to teacher ratio: 12.8:1
- Colors: Green and White
- Athletics conference: Tri-State Christian Athletic Conference
- Team name: Cougars
- Accreditation: Middle States Association of Colleges and Schools and Association of Christian Schools International
- Tuition: $8,121 (grades 9–12 for 2022–23)
- Website: www.acseht.org

Atlantic Christian School is a private, coeducational Christian school in Egg Harbor Township, in Atlantic County, in the U.S. state of New Jersey, serving students in pre-kindergarten through twelfth grade. The school colors are green and white, and the mascot is the cougar. The school is dually accredited by the Middle States Association of Colleges and Schools (until July 2026) and by the Association of Christian Schools International.

As of the 2023–24 school year, the school had an enrollment of 555 students and 43.5 classroom teachers (on an FTE basis), for a student–teacher ratio of 12.8:1. The school's student body was 64.3% (357) White, 15.9% (88) Hispanic, 9.0% (50) Black, 8.8% (49) two or more races, 1.6% (9) Asian and 0.4% (2) American Indian / Alaska Native . Tuition is $7,325 for grades 9-12 for 2022-23. After graduation, 75% of students go on to attend a four-year college.

== History ==
Atlantic Christian School was founded in 1971 in Ventnor City, New Jersey.

Atlantic Christian School opened a permanent school facility on a 37-acre (15 ha) campus in Egg Harbor Township in January 2004.

Atlantic Christian School is an interdenominational, independent school and is governed by a board of directors elected by the Atlantic Christian School Association. Over 100 churches are represented in the student body.

All full-time faculty teaching core curriculum subjects hold bachelor's degrees and average seven years of teaching experience. One-third of the faculty and staff hold master's degrees. All faculty are required to hold a New Jersey state certification and/or ACSI Christian school teacher certification. Teachers are encouraged to pursue opportunities for continuing education.

Atlantic Christian School is a member of the Association of Christian School International (ACSI) and its faculty, staff, and board members regularly attend ACSI training and development programs.
