= 2017–18 VCU Rams men's basketball team =

American college basketball season

2017–18 VCU Rams men's basketball
- Conference: Atlantic 10 Conference
- Record: 18–15 (9–9 A-10)
- Head coach: Mike Rhoades (1st season)
- Assistant coaches: J. D. Byers; Brent Scott; Jeremy Ballard
- Home arena: Stuart C. Siegel Center

2017–18 Atlantic 10 men's basketball standings
	Conf.				Overall
Team	W		L	PCT	W		L	PCT
Rhode Island	15	–	3	.833	26	–	8	.765
St. Bonaventure	14	–	4	.778	26	–	8	.765
Davidson †	13	–	5	.722	21	–	12	.636
Saint Joseph's	10	–	8	.556	16	–	16	.500
VCU	9	–	9	.500	18	–	15	.545
Saint Louis	9	–	9	.500	17	–	16	.515
George Mason	9	–	9	.500	16	–	17	.485
Richmond	9	–	9	.500	12	–	20	.375
Dayton	8	–	10	.444	14	–	17	.452
Duquesne	7	–	11	.389	16	–	16	.500
George Washington	7	–	11	.389	15	–	18	.455
La Salle	7	–	11	.389	13	–	19	.406
Massachusetts	5	–	13	.278	13	–	20	.394
Fordham	4	–	14	.222	9	–	22	.290
† 2018 A10 Tournament winner Rankings from AP poll

The 2017–18 VCU Rams men's basketball team represented Virginia Commonwealth University during the 2017–18 NCAA Division I men's basketball season. The Rams were led by Mike Rhoades in his first season as head coach at VCU. The Rams played their home games at Stuart C. Siegel Center in Richmond, Virginia as members of the Atlantic 10 Conference.

A chain of lost recruiting classes, coaching personnel changes, losses against low RPI teams, no wins against Top 50 RPI teams, and a graduating core of players resulted in a downturn in the team's fortunes. The team finished the season 18–15, 9–9 record in A-10 play to finish in a four-way tie for fifth place. The season was the 18th consecutive season the program finished with a winning record. As the No. 8 seed in the A-10 tournament, the Rams defeated Dayton in the second round before losing to Rhode Island in the quarterfinals.

The Rams failed to qualify for the NCAA tournament for the first time since 2010, and failed to achieve a 20-win season for the first time since 2006. On March 11, 2018, Ed McLaughlin, the Athletics Director announced that VCU had declined an invitation to play in the College Basketball Invitational tournament. This marked the first season since 2006 the Rams did not play in a postseason tournament.

== Previous season ==
The Rams finished the 2016–17 season 26–9, 14–4 in A-10 play to finish in second place. VCU defeated George Mason and Richmond in the A-10 tournament to advance to the championship game, where they lost to Rhode Island. They earned an at-large bid to the NCAA tournament as the No. 10 seed in the West Region. There they lost to No. 7 Saint Mary's in the first round.

Head coach Will Wade resigned on March 20 to take the head coaching position at LSU following the firing of Johnny Jones. Wade was the head coach for the two seasons, making him VCU's shortest tenured head coach since Benny Dees. On March 21, the school hired Rice head coach Mike Rhoades, who had been the associate head coach under Shaka Smart from 2009 to 2014.

== Offseason ==
=== Departures ===
Name	Number	Pos.	Height	Weight	Year	Hometown	Notes
JeQuan Lewis	1	G	6'1"	180	Senior	Dickson, Tennessee	Graduated
Samir Doughty	2	G	6'4"	185	Freshman (redshirt)	Philadelphia, Pennsylvania	Transferred to Auburn
Doug Brooks	5	G	6'4"	200	Senior	Lake Wales, Florida	Graduated
Mo Alie-Cox	12	F	6'7"	250	Senior (redshirt)	Alexandria, Virginia	Graduated
Torey Burston	14	G	5'8"	180	Senior (redshirt)	Richmond, Virginia	Graduated
Marquell Fraser	15	G	6'5"	205	Freshman	Hamilton, Ontario	Transferred to Midland College
Jordan Burgess	20	G/F	6'5"	225	Senior (redshirt)	Midlothian, Virginia	Graduated
Ahmed Hamdy-Mohamed	23	F	6'9"	240	Senior	Alexandria, Egypt	Transferred to TCU

=== Transfers ===
Name	Number	Pos.	Height	Weight	Year	Hometown	Notes
Marcus Evans	2	G	6'2"	195	Sophomore	Chesapeake, Virginia	Transferred from Rice. Will be eligible to play in 2018–19.
Khris Lane	4	F	6'6"	225	RS-Senior	Richmond, Virginia	Transferred from Longwood.
Mike'l Simms	13	G	6'5	220	Freshman	Highland Springs, Virginia	Transferred from Cowley Community College.
Xavier Jackson	14	G	6'3		Sophomore	Hinesville, Georgia	Transferred from Sheridan College.
Corey Douglas		F	6'8"		Sophomore	Louisville, Kentucky	Will attend Tallahassee Community College for the 2017–18 season and will then transfer to VCU. Spent the 2016–17 season at Rice.

=== 2017 recruiting class ===
College recruiting information
Name	Hometown	School	Height	Weight	Commit date
Marcus Santos-Silva; PF	Taunton, MA	Vermont Academy	6 ft 7 in (2.01 m)	265 lb (120 kg)	Sep 21, 2016
Marcus Santos-Silva; PF	Recruit ratings: Scout: Rivals: 247Sports: (73)				
Sean Mobley; PF	Melbourne, FL	Montverde Academy	6 ft 9 in (2.06 m)	225 lb (102 kg)	Sep 25, 2016
Sean Mobley; PF	Recruit ratings: Scout: Rivals: 247Sports: (80)				
Lewis Djonkam; PF	Springfield, VA	Hargrave Military Academy	6 ft 9 in (2.06 m)	245 lb (111 kg)	Apr 26, 2017
Lewis Djonkam; PF	Recruit ratings: Scout: Rivals: 247Sports: (N/A)				
Tyler Maye; PG	Farmville, NC	Farmville Central High School	6 ft 2 in (1.88 m)	170 lb (77 kg)	May 11, 2017
Tyler Maye; PG	Recruit ratings: Scout: Rivals: 247Sports: (N/A)				
Overall recruit ranking:
Note: In many cases, Scout, Rivals, 247Sports, On3, and ESPN may conflict in their listings of height and weight.; In these cases, the average was taken. ESPN grades are on a 100-point scale.; Sources: "VCU 2017 Player Commits". ESPN.; "2017 Team Ranking". Rivals.

=== 2018 Recruiting class ===
College recruiting information (2018)
Name	Hometown	School	Height	Weight	Commit date
P. J. Byrd; PG	Houston, TX	George Bush High School	6 ft 1 in (1.85 m)	169 lb (77 kg)	Sep 6, 2017
P. J. Byrd; PG	Recruit ratings: Scout: Rivals: 247Sports: (NR)				
KeShawn Curry; SG	Jacksonville, FL	Fork Union Military Academy	6 ft 4 in (1.93 m)	180 lb (82 kg)	Oct 2, 2017
KeShawn Curry; SG	Recruit ratings: Scout: Rivals: 247Sports: (NR)				
Vince Williams Jr. SF	Toledo, OH	St. John's Jesuit	6 ft 5 in (1.96 m)	204 lb (93 kg)	Oct 4, 2017
Vince Williams Jr. SF	Recruit ratings: Scout: Rivals: 247Sports: (80)				
Overall recruit ranking:
Note: In many cases, Scout, Rivals, 247Sports, On3, and ESPN may conflict in their listings of height and weight.; In these cases, the average was taken. ESPN grades are on a 100-point scale.; Sources: "VCU 2018 Player Commits". ESPN.; "2018 Team Ranking". Rivals.

== Roster ==
2017–18 VCU Rams men's basketball team
Players
Coaches

Pos.	#	Name	Height	Weight	Year	Previous school	Hometown
G	0	De'Riante Jenkins	6 ft 5 in (1.96 m)	195 lb (88 kg)	So	Hargrave Military Academy	Eutawville, South Carolina
G	1	Mike'l Simms	6 ft 5 in (1.96 m)	220 lb (100 kg)	RS So	Cowley Community College	Richmond, Virginia
G	2	Marcus Evans (I) (redshirt)	6 ft 2 in (1.88 m)	190 lb (86 kg)	So	Rice	Chesapeake, Virginia
F	4	Justin Tillman	6 ft 7 in (2.01 m)	220 lb (100 kg)	Sr	Pershing High School	Detroit, Michigan
F	5	Sean Mobley	6 ft 9 in (2.06 m)	240 lb (109 kg)	Fr	Montverde Academy	Melbourne, Florida
G	10	Jonathan Williams	6 ft 1 in (1.85 m)	200 lb (91 kg)	Sr	St. Benedict's Prep	Richmond, Virginia
F	11	Issac Vann	6 ft 6 in (1.98 m)	210 lb (95 kg)	RS So	Maine	Bridgeport, Connecticut
G	12	Dylan Sheehy-Guiseppi	6 ft 1 in (1.85 m)	195 lb (88 kg)	Fr	St. Francis Prep (Michigan)	Lake Havasu City, Arizona
G	13	Malik Crowfield	6 ft 4 in (1.93 m)	195 lb (88 kg)	So	Riverside Academy	LaPlace, Louisiana
F	14	Marcus Santos-Silva	6 ft 7 in (2.01 m)	255 lb (116 kg)	Fr	Vermont Academy	Taunton, Massachusetts
G	15	Xavier Jackson	6 ft 3 in (1.91 m)	190 lb (86 kg)	Jr	Sheridan College	Hinesville, Georgia
F	21	Khris Lane	6 ft 7 in (2.01 m)	245 lb (111 kg)	RS Sr	Longwood	Richmond, Virginia
F	22	Lewis Djonkam	6 ft 9 in (2.06 m)	245 lb (111 kg)	Fr	Hargrave Military Academy	Springfield, Virginia
G	25	Tyler Maye	6 ft 1 in (1.85 m)	175 lb (79 kg)	Fr	Farmville Central High School	Farmville, North Carolina

Head coach

- Mike Rhoades (Lebanon Valley)

Assistant coach(es)

- J. D. Byers (Lebanon Valley)
- Brent Scott (Rice)
- Jeremy Ballard (Colgate)

Legend

- (C) Team captain
- (S) Suspended
- (I) Ineligible
- (W) Walk-on
- Injured
- Current redshirt

Roster

== Preseason ==
In a poll of the league's head coaches and select media members at the conference's media day, the Rams were picked to finish in fourth place in the A-10. Justin Tillman was named to the conference's preseason first team. Tillman and Jonathan Williams were named to the preseason All-Defensive team.

== Schedule and results ==
Date time, TV	Rank^{#}	Opponent^{#}	Result	Record	High points	High rebounds	High assists	Site (attendance) city, state
Exhibition
Oct 26, 2017*; 7:00 pm		Liberty; Hurricane Relief Exhibition	L 69–85	N/A	14 – Crowfield	6 – Vann	5 – Williams	Siegel Center (3,497); Richmond, VA
Nov 3, 2017*; 7:00 pm		Virginia Union	W 98–74	N/A	21 – Lane	8 – Lane	6 – Williams	Siegel Center (7,637); Richmond, VA
Non-conference regular season
Nov 10, 2017*; 7:00 pm, MASN		Grambling State	W 94–65	1–0	14 – 3 Tied	10 – Tillman	5 – Williams	Siegel Center (7,637); Richmond, VA
Nov 13, 2017*; 7:00 pm, MASN		North Florida; Maui Invitational Mainland game	W 95–85	2–0	27 – Tillman	8 – Tied	8 – Williams	Siegel Center (7,637); Richmond, VA
Nov 17, 2017*; 4:00 pm, CBSSN		Virginia	L 67–76	2–1	19 – Vann	8 – Tillman	8 – Williams	Siegel Center (7,637); Richmond, VA
Nov 20, 2017*; 2:30 pm, ESPN2		vs. Marquette; Maui Invitational Tournament quarterfinals	L 83–94	2–2	17 – Crowfield	7 – Tillman	6 – Williams	Lahaina Civic Center (2,400); Lahaina, HI
Nov 21, 2017*; 7:00 pm, ESPN2		vs. California; Maui Invitational Tournament consolation 2nd round	W 83–69	3–2	27 – Jenkins	11 – Jenkins	8 – Williams	Lahaina Civic Center (2,400); Lahaina, HI
Nov 22, 2017*; 5:00 pm, ESPN2		vs. Michigan; Maui Invitational Tournament 5th place game	L 60–68	3–3	13 – Lane	8 – Lane	2 – Tied	Lahaina Civic Center (2,400); Lahaina, HI
Nov 28, 2017*; 7:00 pm, MASN		Appalachian State	W 85–72	4–3	21 – Tillman	6 – Tied	7 – Williams	Siegel Center (7,637); Richmond, VA
Dec 2, 2017*; 7:00 pm, MASN		Old Dominion; Rivalry	W 82–75	5–3	28 – Tillman	9 – Santos-Silva	9 – Williams	Siegel Center (7,637); Richmond, VA
Dec 5, 2017*; 7:00 pm, ESPN2		Texas	L 67–71	5–4	22 – Tillman	10 – Tillman	7 – Williams	Siegel Center (7,637); Richmond, VA
Dec 9, 2017*; 3:00 pm, FOX		at No. 19 Seton Hall; Never Forget Tribute Classic	L 67–90	5–5	20 – Tillman	8 – Tillman	6 – Williams	Prudential Center (9,112); Newark, NJ
Dec 16, 2017*; 6:00 pm, WTVR		Bucknell	W 85–79	6–5	26 – Tillman	7 – Tillman	6 – Williams	Siegel Center (7,637); Richmond, VA
Dec 19, 2017*; 7:00 pm, MASN		Winthrop	W 68–53	7–5	22 – Tillman	11 – Tillman	6 – Williams	Siegel Center (7,637); Richmond, VA
Dec 22, 2017*; 7:00 pm, WTVR		VMI	W 75–65	8–5	19 – Tillman	13 – Tillman	9 – Williams	Siegel Center (7,637); Richmond, VA
Atlantic 10 regular season
Dec 30, 2017; 12:30 pm, NBCSN		Fordham	W 76–63	9–5 (1–0)	23 – Tillman	14 – Tillman	5 – Vann	Siegel Center (7,637); Richmond, VA
Jan 3, 2018; 7:00 pm		at Saint Joseph's	L 81–87 ^{OT}	9–6 (1–1)	22 – Tillman	12 – Tillman	5 – Jenkins	Hagan Arena (3,518); Philadelphia, PA
Jan 6, 2018; 2:00 pm, NBCSN		at La Salle	W 80–74	10–6 (2–1)	20 – Jenkins	10 – Tillman	5 – Williams	Tom Gola Arena (2,312); Philadelphia, PA
Jan 9, 2018; 8:00 pm, Stadium		Duquesne	W 78–67	11–6 (3–1)	21 – Williams	17 – Tillman	4 – Williams	Siegel Center (7,637); Richmond, VA
Jan 12, 2018; 7:00 pm, ESPN2		at Dayton	L 79–106	11–7 (3–2)	26 – Tillman	12 – Tillman	6 – Jenkins	UD Arena (12,507); Dayton, OH
Jan 17, 2018; 7:00 pm		Richmond; Capital City Classic	L 52–67	11–8 (3–3)	12 – Tillman	9 – Tillman	2 – Williams	Siegel Center (7,637); Richmond, VA
Jan 20, 2018; 12:30 pm, NBCSN		George Washington	W 87–63	12–8 (4–3)	18 – Jenkins	8 – Tillman	4 – Williams	Siegel Center (7,637); Richmond, VA
Jan 23, 2018; 9:00 pm, CBSSN		at Saint Louis	W 75–74 ^{OT}	13–8 (5–3)	25 – Tillman	12 – Tillman	5 – Williams	Chaifetz Arena (5,649); St. Louis, MO
Jan 27, 2018; 2:00 pm, CBSSN		at George Mason; Rivalry	W 84–76	14–8 (6–3)	25 – Lane	12 – Lane	6 – Williams	EagleBank Arena (7,028); Fairfax, VA
Feb 2, 2018; 7:00 pm, ESPN2		No. 22 Rhode Island	L 68–81	14–9 (6–4)	22 – Tillman	6 – Tillman	4 – Williams	Siegel Center (7,637); Richmond, VA
Feb 7, 2018; 9:00 pm, CBSSN		at Richmond; Capital City Classic	L 76–77	14–10 (6–5)	21 – Tillman	4 – Lane	4 – Jenkins	Robins Center (7,201); Richmond, VA
Feb 10, 2018; 6:00 pm, CBSSN		Dayton	W 88–84 ^{OT}	15–10 (7–5)	37 – Tillman	8 – Tillman	5 – Williams	Siegel Center (7,637); Richmond, VA
Feb 14, 2018; 7:00 pm, CBSSN		Davidson	L 63–74	15–11 (7–6)	22 – Tillman	8 – Tillman	7 – Williams	Siegel Center (7,637); Richmond, VA
Feb 17, 2018; 4:00 pm, Stadium		at George Washington	L 56–80	15–12 (7–7)	11 – Tillman	13 – Tillman	4 – Williams	Charles E. Smith Center (3,979); Washington, D.C.
Feb 21, 2018; 7:00 pm, MASN		at Massachusetts	W 82–78	16–12 (8–7)	26 – Tillman	13 – Tillman	7 – Mobley	Mullins Center (3,322); Amherst, MA
Feb 24, 2018; 8:00 pm, CBSSN		St. Bonaventure	L 63–68	16–13 (8–8)	20 – Tillman	10 – Tillman	7 – Williams	Siegel Center (7,637); Richmond, VA
Feb 28, 2018; 7:00 pm, MASN		George Mason; Rivalry	L 80–81	16–14 (8–9)	20 – Simms	11 – Tillman	6 – Williams	Siegel Center (7,637); Richmond, VA
Mar 3, 2018; 2:00 pm, WTVR		at Fordham	W 83–58	17–14 (9–9)	18 – Tillman	13 – Tillman	4 – Crowfield	Rose Hill Gymnasium (2,325); Bronx, NY
Atlantic 10 tournament
Mar 8, 2018; 12:00 pm, NBCSN	(8)	vs. (9) Dayton; Second Round	W 77–72	18–14	15 – Tillman	10 – Tillman	5 – Tied	Capital One Arena (6,483); Washington, D.C.
Mar 9, 2018; 12:00 pm, NBCSN	(8)	vs. (1) No. 25 Rhode Island; Quarterfinals	L 67–76	18–15	23 – Tillman	15 – Tillman	7 – Williams	Capital One Arena (7,321); Washington, D.C.
*Non-conference game. ^{#}Rankings from AP Poll. (#) Tournament seedings in parentheses. All times are in Eastern Time.
