= Saint Patrick School (New Jersey) =

Catholic school in Chatham, New Jersey

Coordinates: 40.737299°N 74.388197°W

Saint Patrick School is a Catholic school that was founded in 1872 in Chatham, New Jersey to serve students of the Roman Catholic parish of Saint Patrick Church with pre-kindergarten through eighth grade education. The school is operated under the auspices of the Roman Catholic Diocese of Paterson. Following the recent founding of Corpus Christi Church in Chatham Township the students of that parish also are served, having been served previously within the parish of Saint Patrick (prior to the establishment of the new parish).

In 2009, the school was re-accredited by the Middle States Association of Colleges and Schools. As of the 2009-10 school year, the school had an enrollment of 368 students and 31.6 classroom teachers (on an FTE basis), for a student-teacher ratio of 13:1.

== Awards and recognition ==
During the 2003-04 school year, Saint Patrick School was awarded the Blue Ribbon School Award of Excellence by the United States Department of Education, the highest award an American school can receive.

In 2004, the Home and School Association was recognized by the National Catholic Education Association. In 2006, the school was selected as a Green Flag School by Green Faith, an environmental group. In 2007, a teacher at Saint Patrick School received the Teacher of Year Award from Saint Jude Children’s Research Hospital.

In 2011, the school was chosen as a "Star School" within the Paterson Diocese in recognition of the school's high student achievement and specialization programs that serve to address the educational services and needs of its student body.
