= David Cox (basketball) =

American basketball player and coach

Current position
- Title: Assistant coach
- Team: Villanova
- Conference: Big East Conference

Biographical details
- Born: October 17, 1973 (age 53); Washington, D.C., U.S.
- Education: William & Mary

Coaching career (HC unless noted)
- 1996–1999: Archbishop Carroll HS (assistant)
- 2006–2007: Pittsburgh (assistant)
- 2007–2010: Georgetown (assistant)
- 2010–2014: Rutgers (assistant)
- 2012: Rutgers (interim HC)
- 2014–2018: Rhode Island (assistant)
- 2018–2022: Rhode Island
- 2022–2025: Maryland (assistant)
- 2025–present: Villanova (assistant)

Head coaching record
- Overall: 64–55 (.538)

David Cox (born October 17, 1973) is an American college basketball coach, who is currently an assistant coach at Villanova University.

== Playing career ==
Cox was a four-year letterwinner at William & Mary from 1991 to 1995, where he ranks eighth all-time in assists.

== Coaching career ==
=== Early career ===
Earning a master's degree in education from William & Mary in 1996, Cox embarked on an education and coaching career, which saw him get his start in coaching at Archbishop Carroll (DC) as an assistant coach for the boys basketball team. In addition to high school coaching, Cox coached AAU basketball with D.C. Assault before landing his first college basketball position as the director of basketball operations under Jamie Dixon at Pittsburgh in 2006.

=== Georgetown ===
Cox then returned to the Washington, D.C. area to serve as an assistant coach at Georgetown under John Thompson III from 2007 to 2010.

=== Rutgers ===
In 2010, Cox joined the basketball staff at Rutgers under Mike Rice Jr., reuniting the pair after both being assistants at Pittsburgh. After Rice was suspended by Rutgers during an investigation into his abusive behavior toward players, Cox served as interim head coach of the team, compiling a 3–0 record. However, Rutgers credits all wins and losses to Rice during the 2012–13 season.

Cox remained on Rutgers' staff for one season under Eddie Jordan, before being relieved of his duties following the 2013–14 season.

=== Rhode Island ===
Cox joined Dan Hurley's staff at the University of Rhode Island as an assistant coach in 2014 and was a part of the Rams' Atlantic 10 conference tournament and regular season title squads that participated in the NCAA Tournament in 2017 and 2018.

On April 4, 2018, Cox was elevated to the position of head coach, becoming the 20th head coach in Rhode Island history as he replaced Hurley who departed for the head men's basketball coaching position at UConn. He finished with a 18–15 record in his first season and 21–9 in his second. Cox was fired on March 11, 2022, after finishing with a 64–55 record in four seasons.

== Head coaching record ==
Record table
Season	Team	Overall	Conference	Standing	Postseason
Rhode Island Rams (Atlantic 10 Conference) (2018–2022)
2018–19	Rhode Island	18–15	9–9	8th	
2019–20	Rhode Island	21–9	13–5	3rd	
2020–21	Rhode Island	10–15	7–10	10th	
2021–22	Rhode Island	15–16	5–12	11th	
Rhode Island:		64–55 (.538)	34–36 (.486)		
Total:		64–55 (.538)			
