= Dan Hurley =

American basketball coach (born 1973)

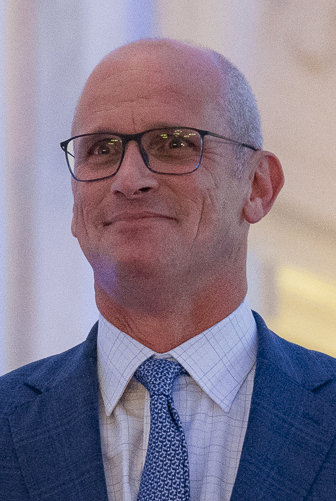
- Hurley in 2024

Current position
- Title: Head coach
- Team: UConn
- Conference: Big East
- Record: 203–76 (.728)

Biographical details
- Born: January 16, 1973 (age 53); Jersey City, New Jersey, U.S.

Playing career
- 1991–1996: Seton Hall
- Position: Point guard

Coaching career (HC unless noted)
- 1996–1997: St. Anthony HS (assistant)
- 1997–2001: Rutgers (assistant)
- 2001–2010: St. Benedict's Prep
- 2010–2012: Wagner
- 2012–2018: Rhode Island
- 2018–present: UConn

Head coaching record
- Overall: 354–181 (.662)
- Tournaments: 20–6 (NCAA Division I); 1–1 (NIT)

Accomplishments and honors

Championships
- 2 NCAA Division I tournament (2023, 2024); 3 NCAA Division I regional – Final Four (2023, 2024, 2026); A-10 tournament (2017); A-10 regular season (2018); Big East tournament (2024); Big East regular season (2024)

Awards
- Naismith Coach of the Year (2024); Sporting News National Coach of the Year (2024); A-10 Coach of the Year (2018); Big East Coach of the Year (2024)

Daniel S. Hurley (born January 16, 1973) is an American men's college basketball coach who is the head coach of the UConn Huskies. In 2023 and 2024, Hurley led UConn to back-to-back NCAA Division I national championships, and led the Huskies to another title game appearance in 2026. He previously coached at Rhode Island and Wagner.

== Early life and education ==
Hurley was born to Hall of Fame high school coach Bob Hurley Sr. and Christine Hurley on January 16, 1973, in Jersey City, New Jersey, where he was raised with his siblings Bobby and Melissa. Bobby is a former Duke guard and the former head coach at Arizona State.

Hurley was a basketball star at St. Anthony High School in Jersey City where his father was the longtime coach. He led the team to a 31–1 record and a No. 2 national ranking as a senior.

He played five years of college basketball, including a redshirt year, at Seton Hall. He played under head coach P. J. Carlesimo during his first three seasons. In the 2025 ESPN documentary "The Other Hurley," Hurley described how he had to step away from basketball at the beginning of his junior year in 1993, after playing in only two games, for mental health reasons. He stated that even though "I never was chasing my brother," that same year his brother Bobby, who had been a star player at Duke, was drafted seventh in the NBA draft, and Dan put enormous pressure on himself to succeed, leading to an anxiety condition he described as "the Yips." After taking the year off, he returned to have excellent junior and senior years at Seton Hall, averaging 13.8 and 14.3 points per game, respectively.

== Career ==
From 2001-2010 Hurley was head coach of Saint Benedict's Preparatory School in New Jersey, where he is credited with building one of the top high school basketball programs in America. During his nine years at St. Benedict’s he compiled an 223–21 record, coached four McDonald’s All-Americans, and guided four teams to top-five national rankings.

He was the head coach at Wagner College for two years (2010–2012), where he set the school single-season win-loss record at 25–6 during the 2011–2012 season.

He was then head coach at the University of Rhode Island for six years (2012–2018), bringing the team to the 2017 and 2018 NCAA tournaments, the first times since 1999. Hurley turned down a long-term offer from Rhode Island in order to lead the University of Connecticut Huskies.

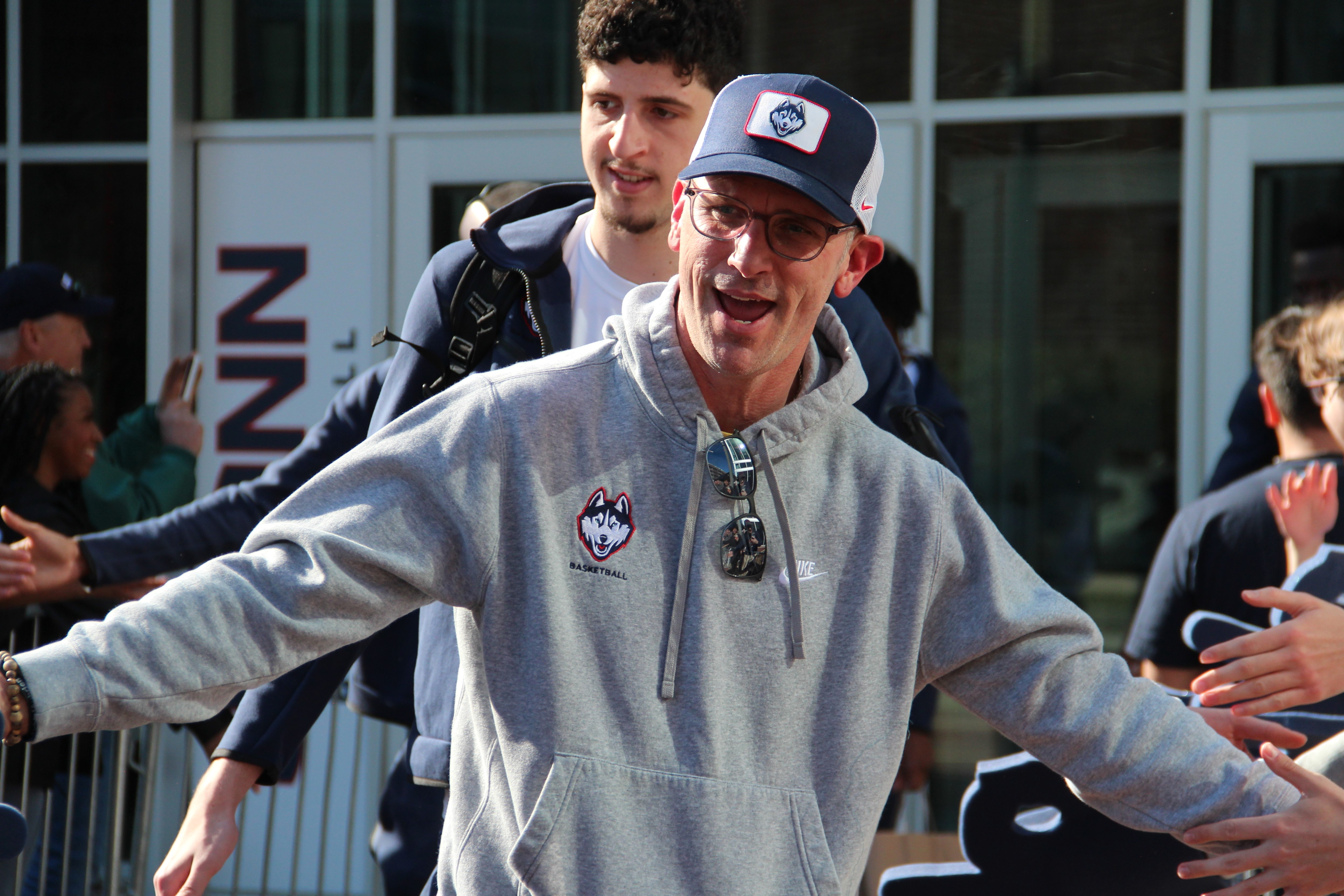
Hurley during a 2023 departure ceremony for the NCAA Final Four

From 2010 to 2013, his brother Bobby was one of his assistant coaches at both Rhode Island and Wagner.

=== University of Connecticut ===
He was named head coach of UConn on March 22, 2018. In 2021, the Huskies returned to the NCAA tournament for the first time since 2016, then again in 2022, losing in the first round both times. He won the NCAA championship with the Huskies in 2023. In June 2023, he agreed to a six-year contract extension with UConn worth $32.1M. In July 2024, he signed an extension worth $50M over six years.

In the 2023–24 season, Hurley led the Huskies to a school-record 37 wins, a Big East regular season title, a Big East tournament championship, a #1 overall seed in the NCAA tournament for the first time in school history, and a second-straight NCAA national championship. He was named the Naismith College Coach of the Year and received the Sporting News National Coach of the Year Award.

In the days after winning the 2024 Final Four, Hurley received and declined a lucrative head coaching offer from Kentucky. In June 2024 he interviewed with the Los Angeles Lakers, but declined their offer as well, choosing to return to UConn to attempt to win a third straight championship.

== Personal life ==
Hurley married Andrea Sirakides in 1997. They met while they were both students at Seton Hall. They have two sons: Danny (born July, 1999) and Andrew (born January 30, 2002). Danny graduated from Seton Hall in 2021. Andrew attends the University of Connecticut, where he was on his father's 2023 and 2024 NCAA championship teams.

On September 6, 2019, Hurley had surgery to replace two disks in his neck with artificial ones. Doctors told Hurley the condition was part hereditary and part the result of years of wear and tear associated with being a lifelong athlete. He returned to work less than two weeks after surgery.

Hurley is a practicing Catholic. During his years at Seton Hall, Hurley met psychologist Sister Catherine Waters, who changed his life. He often talks with and thanks Sr. Catherine.

He is an avid fan of the Cincinnati Bengals.

== Head coaching record ==
Record table
Season	Team	Overall	Conference	Standing	Postseason
Wagner Seahawks (Northeast Conference) (2010–2012)
2010–11	Wagner	13–17	9–9	6th	
2011–12	Wagner	25–6	15–3	2nd	
Wagner:		38–23 (.623)	24–12 (.667)		
Rhode Island Rams (Atlantic 10 Conference) (2012–2018)
2012–13	Rhode Island	8–21	3–13	T–14th	
2013–14	Rhode Island	14–18	5–11	10th	
2014–15	Rhode Island	23–10	13–5	T–2nd	NIT Second Round
2015–16	Rhode Island	17–15	9–9	7th	
2016–17	Rhode Island	25–10	13–5	T–3rd	NCAA Division I Round of 32
2017–18	Rhode Island	26–8	15–3	1st	NCAA Division I Round of 32
Rhode Island:		113–82 (.579)	58–46 (.558)		
UConn Huskies (American Athletic Conference) (2018–2020)
2018–19	UConn	16–17	6–12	T–9th	
2019–20	UConn	19–12	10–8	5th	
UConn Huskies (Big East Conference) (2020–present)
2020–21	UConn	15–8	11–6	3rd	NCAA Division I Round of 64
2021–22	UConn	23–10	13–6	3rd	NCAA Division I Round of 64
2022–23	UConn	31–8	13–7	T–4th	NCAA Division I Champion
2023–24	UConn	37–3	18–2	1st	NCAA Division I Champion
2024–25	UConn	24–11	14–6	3rd	NCAA Division I Round of 32
2025–26	UConn	34–6	17–3	2nd	NCAA Division I Runner-up
2026–27	UConn	4–1	0–0		
UConn:		203–76 (.728)	102–50 (.671)		
Total:		354–181 (.662)			
National champion Postseason invitational champion Conference regular season champion Conference regular season and conference tournament champion Division regular season champion Division regular season and conference tournament champion Conference tournament champion
