= Cyril Langevine =

American basketball player

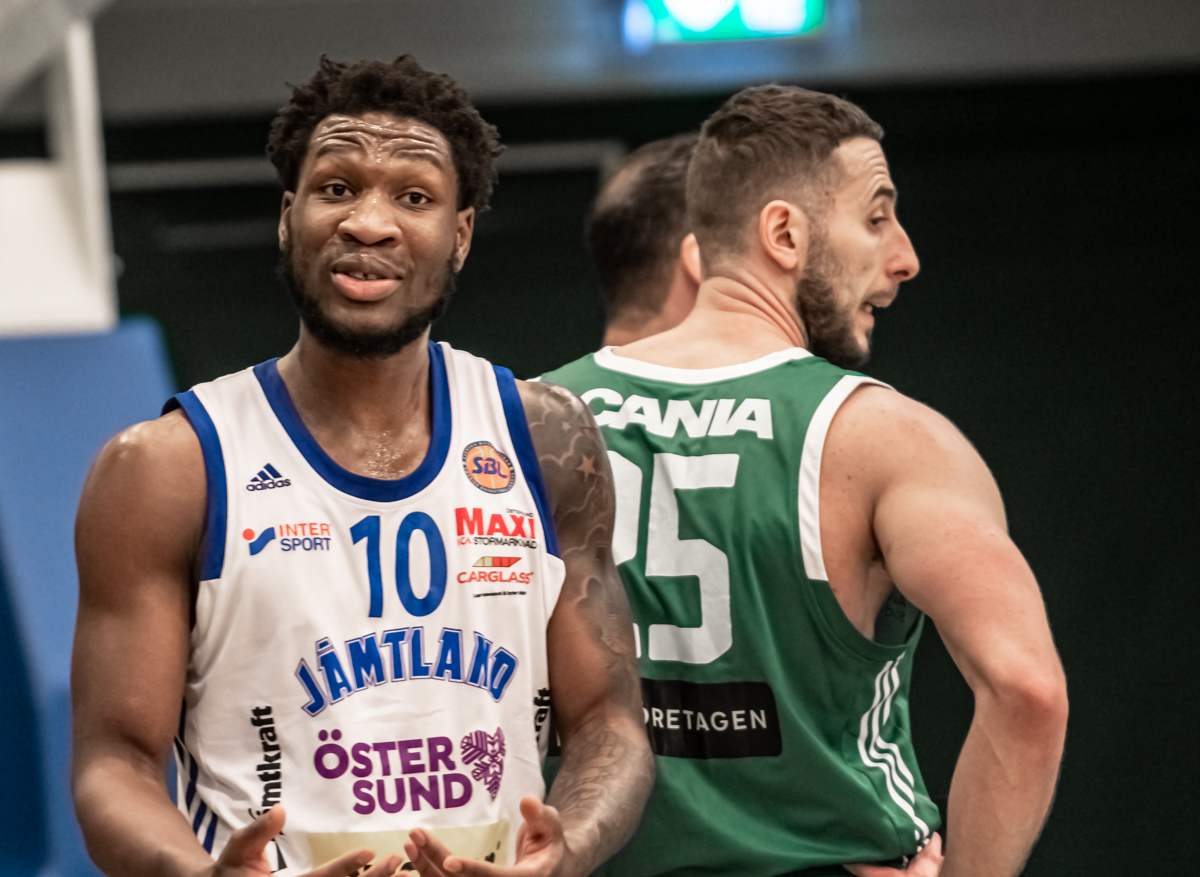
- Langevine in 2021

No. 55 – Karşıyaka Basket
- Position: Center / power forward
- League: Basketbol Süper Ligi

Personal information
- Born: October 16, 1998 (age 28) Georgetown, Guyana
- Listed height: 6 ft 8 in (2.03 m)
- Listed weight: 225 lb (102 kg)

Career information
- High school: The Patrick School (Hillside, New Jersey)
- College: Rhode Island (2016–2020)
- NBA draft: 2020: undrafted
- Playing career: 2020–present

Career history
- 2020–2021: Jämtland
- 2021–2022: Śląsk Wrocław
- 2022: Wilki Morskie Szczecin
- 2022–2023: Lavrio
- 2023: Scaligera Verona
- 2023–2024: Chorale Roanne
- 2024–2025: Maroussi
- 2025–2026: Hapoel Galil Elyon
- 2026–present: Karşıyaka Basket

Career highlights
- Second-team All-Atlantic 10 (2019)

Cyril Langevine Jr. (born August 16, 1998) is a Guyanese–American professional basketball player for Karşıyaka Basket of the Turkish Basketbol Süper Ligi (BSL). He played college basketball for the Rhode Island Rams.

== High school career ==
Raised in East Orange, New Jersey, Langevine attended The Patrick School. He averaged 7.6 points per game as a junior. As a senior, Langevine averaged 10 points, seven rebounds, and two blocks per game. In September 2015, he committed to play college basketball at Rhode Island over offers from Fairleigh Dickinson, Duquesne, Quinnipiac, Robert Morris, George Mason, St. Francis (Pa.), St. Bonaventure and Buffalo.

== College career ==
As a freshman, Langevine averaged 3.2 points and 4.5 rebounds per game on a team that reached the NCAA Tournament. He was limited by injuries during his sophomore year and averaged 6.1 points and 5.8 rebounds per game off the bench. On March 1, 2019, he scored a career-high 26 points in a 72–70 overtime victory against Dayton. Langevine averaged 14.7 points, 9.9 rebounds, and 1.4 blocks per game as a junior, shooting 56.7 percent from the field. He was named to the Second Team All-Atlantic 10. As a senior, Langevine averaged 10.1 points, 10.3 rebounds and two blocks per game. He surpassed the 1,000 career point mark shortly before the season was ended due to the COVID-19 pandemic.

Langevine in Rhode Island (#10) sizing up Maryland's Makhi Mitchell (#21)

== Professional career ==
On September 10, 2020, Langevine signed his first professional contract with Jämtland Basket of the Swedish Basketligan. He averaged 14.3 points, 11.9 rebounds, 1.2 assists and 1.8 blocks per game. Langevine was named to the First Team All-Basketligan and helped the team reach the semifinals.

On July 15, 2021, he signed with Śląsk Wrocław of the Polish Basketball League. Langevine averaged 9.2 points, 6.5 rebounds, 1.1 assists, and 1.1 blocks per game. On January 28, 2022, he signed with Wilki Morskie Szczecin of the Polish Basketball League.

On June 26, 2022, he signed with Mitteldeutscher BC of the German Basketball Bundesliga. On August 31, 2022, his contract has been terminated after the surgery and related to the needed long recovery period.

On December 9, 2022, Langevine signed with Greek club Lavrio for the rest of the season, replacing Al Durham. In 14 league games, he averaged 12.4 points and 6.9 rebounds in 24 minutes per contest while shooting 63.5% from the floor.

On April 11, 2023, he signed with Scagliera Verona of the Italian LBA. In five games he averaged 8.8 points, 6.6 rebounds, 0.8 assists, 0.4 steals, 0.6 blocks, and 24.6 minutes per game while shooting 54.5% from the floor.

On September 11, 2023, he signed with Chorale Roanne Basket of the LNB Pro A. In 31 games he averaged 5.7 points, 3.9 rebounds, 0.6 assists, 0.5 steals, 0.4 blocks, and 15.0 minutes per game while shooting 50.4% from the floor.

On June 21, 2024, he joined Maroussi of the Greek Basketball League. He averaged 9.0 points, 6.4 rebounds, 0.9 assists, 0.9 steals, 0.6 blocks, and 22.8 minutes per game in 38 games while shooting .632 from the floor.

In 2025-26 he is playing for Hapoel Galil Elyon of the Israeli Basketball Premier League.

On November 11, 2026, he signed with Karşıyaka Basket of the Turkish Basketbol Süper Ligi (BSL).
