= Jarvis Garrett =

American basketball player

No. 1 – Gence
- Position: Point guard
- League: ABL

Personal information
- Born: May 13, 1995 (age 31) Milwaukee, Wisconsin, U.S.
- Listed height: 6 ft 0 in (1.83 m)
- Listed weight: 174 lb (79 kg)

Career information
- High school: Notre Dame Prep (Fitchburg, Massachusetts)
- College: Rhode Island (2014–2018)
- NBA draft: 2018: undrafted
- Playing career: 2018–present

Career history
- 2018–2019: Omonia
- 2019: Rethymno Cretan Kings
- 2019–2020: APOEL
- 2020–2021: Spišskí Rytieri
- 2021: Jászberény
- 2021–2023: Zabok
- 2023–2024: Barsy Atyrau
- 2024–2026: Anorthosis
- 2026–present: Gence

Career highlights
- Cypriot League assists leader (2019); Cypriot League All-Star (2018)

Jarvis Garrett (born May 13, 1995) is an American professional basketball player for Gence of the Azerbaijan Basketball League (ABL). Standing at 1.83 m (6 ft 0 in), he plays the point guard position. After four years at Rhode Island, Garrett entered the 2018 NBA draft but was not selected in the draft's two rounds.

== High school career ==
Garrett was born in Milwaukee, Wisconsin, the son of Veronica Ragland and Jarvis Garrett. He played his freshman and sophomore years at West Allis Central High School in West Allis, Wisconsin. He transferred to Notre Dame College Prep at Fitchburg, Massachusetts. While playing at Notre Dame Prep, Jarvis Garrett averaged 24.0 points, 5.0 rebounds, 7.0 assists, and 3.0 steals per game. He was a three-star recruit and was one of the top point guard recruits in the country during the late signing period.

== College career ==
After graduating from high school, Garrett played with the Rhode Island Rams. He made 74 starts in 125 games, and averaged 6.4 points, 2.6 rebounds, 3.2 assists, 0.9 steals and 1.5 turnovers with the Rams. Garrett is ranked number 6 in the history of Rams basketball with 398 career assists. He is also tied for 8th place for number assists in a season (2015–2016) with 146. During his sophomore year, he suffered a broken jaw on January 30 vs. St. Joseph's after a flagrant foul; he played the final 10 games of the season with a "Hannibal Lecter" style mask which limited his peripheral vision and communication. Garrett scored a career-high 26 points in a 79–62 win at La Salle, in his first game back from injury. The mask sparked curiosity from observers and caused the Rhode Island student section to wear a hockey mask in his honor. Garrett missed eight games as a junior due to ulcerative colitis. He had four points and for rebounds in a 83–78 win over Oklahoma in the 2018 NCAA Tournament.

== Professional career ==
=== Omonoia ===
After going undrafted in the 2018 NBA draft, Garrett signed with Omonia of the Cypriot League. He averaged 17.7 points, 4.4 rebounds and 5.9 assists in 21 entries Cypriot league. He also led the league in assists during the regular season.

=== Rethymno Cretan Kings ===
After his spell with Omonia, he joined Rethymno Cretan Kings of the Greek Basket League.
