= 2017–18 Saint Joseph's Hawks men's basketball team =

American college basketball season

2017–18 Saint Joseph's Hawks men's basketball
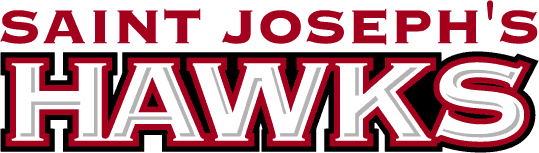
- Conference: Atlantic 10 Conference
- Record: 16–16 (10–8 A-10)
- Head coach: Phil Martelli (23rd season)
- Assistant coaches: Mark Bass; David Duda; Geoff Arnold
- Home arena: Hagan Arena

2017–18 Atlantic 10 men's basketball standings
| | Conf. | | | | Overall |
| Team | W | | L | PCT | W | | L | PCT |
|---|---|---|---|---|---|---|---|---|
| Rhode Island | 15 | – | 3 | .833 | 26 | – | 8 | .765 |
| St. Bonaventure | 14 | – | 4 | .778 | 26 | – | 8 | .765 |
| Davidson † | 13 | – | 5 | .722 | 21 | – | 12 | .636 |
| Saint Joseph's | 10 | – | 8 | .556 | 16 | – | 16 | .500 |
| VCU | 9 | – | 9 | .500 | 18 | – | 15 | .545 |
| Saint Louis | 9 | – | 9 | .500 | 17 | – | 16 | .515 |
| George Mason | 9 | – | 9 | .500 | 16 | – | 17 | .485 |
| Richmond | 9 | – | 9 | .500 | 12 | – | 20 | .375 |
| Dayton | 8 | – | 10 | .444 | 14 | – | 17 | .452 |
| Duquesne | 7 | – | 11 | .389 | 16 | – | 16 | .500 |
| George Washington | 7 | – | 11 | .389 | 15 | – | 18 | .455 |
| La Salle | 7 | – | 11 | .389 | 13 | – | 19 | .406 |
| Massachusetts | 5 | – | 13 | .278 | 13 | – | 20 | .394 |
| Fordham | 4 | – | 14 | .222 | 9 | – | 22 | .290 |
† 2018 A10 Tournament winner Rankings from AP poll

The 2017–18 Saint Joseph's Hawks basketball team represented Saint Joseph's University during the 2017–18 NCAA Division I men's basketball season. The Hawks, led by 23rd-year head coach Phil Martelli, played their home games at Hagan Arena in Philadelphia, Pennsylvania as members of the Atlantic 10 Conference. The Hawks finished the season 16–16, 10–8 in A-10 play to finish in fourth place. The defeated George Mason in the quarterfinals of the A-10 tournament before losing to Rhode Island in the semifinals.

== Previous season ==
The Hawks finished the 2016–17 season 11–20, 4–14 A-10 play to finish in a tie for 12th place. As the No. 13 seed in the A-10 tournament, they lost to Massachusetts in the first round.

== Offseason ==
=== Departures ===
| Name | Number | Pos. | Height | Weight | Year | Hometown | Reason for departure |
|---|---|---|---|---|---|---|---|
| Brendan Casper | 20 | F | 6'6" | 213 | Senior | Audubon, PA | Walk-on; graduated |
| Javon Baumann | 34 | F | 6'8" | 255 | RS Senior | Solms-Oberbiel, Germany | Graduated |

=== 2017 recruiting class ===
College recruiting information
| Name | Hometown | School | Height | Weight | Commit date |
|---|---|---|---|---|---|
| Taylor Funk #58 PF | Manheim Central High School | Manheim, PA | 6 ft 8 in (2.03 m) | N/A | May 12, 2016 |
| Taylor Funk #58 PF | Recruit ratings: Scout: Rivals: 247Sports: ESPN: (76) | | | | |
| Anthony Longpre; C | Ellicott City, MD | Glenelg Country School | 6 ft 9 in (2.06 m) | N/A | Sep 27, 2016 |
| Anthony Longpre; C | Recruit ratings: Scout: Rivals: 247Sports: ESPN: (NR) | | | | |
Overall recruit ranking:
Note: In many cases, Scout, Rivals, 247Sports, On3, and ESPN may conflict in their listings of height and weight.; In these cases, the average was taken. ESPN grades are on a 100-point scale.; Sources: "Saint Joseph's Hawks". ESPN.; "2017 Team Ranking". Rivals.

=== 2018 recruiting class ===
College recruiting information (2018)
| Name | Hometown | School | Height | Weight | Commit date |
|---|---|---|---|---|---|
| Jared Bynum #55 PG | Washington, D.C. | Georgetown Prep | 5 ft 9 in (1.75 m) | N/A | |
| Jared Bynum #55 PG | Recruit ratings: Scout: Rivals: 247Sports: ESPN: (77) | | | | |
Overall recruit ranking:
Note: In many cases, Scout, Rivals, 247Sports, On3, and ESPN may conflict in their listings of height and weight.; In these cases, the average was taken. ESPN grades are on a 100-point scale.; Sources: "Saint Joseph's Hawks". ESPN.; "2018 Team Ranking". Rivals.

== Preseason ==
In a poll of the league's head coaches and select media members at the conference's media day, the Hawks were picked to finish in third place in the A-10. Senior guard Shavar Newkirk was named to the conference's preseason second team.

== Roster ==
2017–18 Saint Joseph's Hawks men's basketball team
Players
Coaches

| Pos. | # | Name | Height | Weight | Year | Previous school | Hometown |
|---|---|---|---|---|---|---|---|
| G | 0 | Lamarr Kimble | 6 ft 0 in (1.83 m) | 185 lb (84 kg) | Jr | Neumann-Goretti | Philadelphia, PA |
| G | 1 | Shavar Newkirk | 6 ft 0 in (1.83 m) | 185 lb (84 kg) | Sr | Cardinal Hayes | Bronx, NY |
| F | 2 | Charlie Brown Jr. | 6 ft 7 in (2.01 m) | 192 lb (87 kg) | So | St. Thomas More School | Philadelphia, PA |
| G | 3 | Michael Booth (W) | 6 ft 3 in (1.91 m) | 205 lb (93 kg) | Sr | Bishop Shanahan | Thornton, PA |
| G | 5 | Nick Robinson | 6 ft 6 in (1.98 m) | 195 lb (88 kg) | So | Kenwood Academy | Chicago, IL |
| F | 10 | Gerald Blount | 6 ft 6 in (1.98 m) | 225 lb (102 kg) | So | Pomfret School | Bayonne, NJ |
| G | 11 | Toliver Freeman (W) | 6 ft 3 in (1.91 m) | 212 lb (96 kg) | So | Catholic | Baton Rouge, LA |
| F | 12 | Anthony Longpré | 6 ft 10 in (2.08 m) | 240 lb (109 kg) | Fr | Glenelg Country (MD) | L'Assomption, QE |
| G | 13 | Christian Vega (W) | 6 ft 0 in (1.83 m) | 188 lb (85 kg) | Sr | Colegio San José | Guaynabo, PR |
| G | 15 | Chris Clover | 6 ft 3 in (1.91 m) | 210 lb (95 kg) | Jr | St. Joseph's Prep | Philadelphia, PA |
| G | 20 | Mike Muggeo (W) | 6 ft 3 in (1.91 m) | 210 lb (95 kg) | Jr | Bergen Catholic | River Vale, NJ |
| G | 21 | Kyle Thompson (W) | 6 ft 2 in (1.88 m) | 200 lb (91 kg) | Sr | St. Joseph's Prep | Mt. Laurel, NJ |
| F | 22 | Lorenzo Edwards | 6 ft 7 in (2.01 m) | 220 lb (100 kg) | So | Lake Forest | Lake Forest, IL |
| F | 23 | Markell Lodge | 6 ft 7 in (2.01 m) | 215 lb (98 kg) | RS Jr | Christian Faith Center Academy | Creedmoor, NC |
| F | 24 | Pierfrancesco Oliva | 6 ft 8 in (2.03 m) | 210 lb (95 kg) | RS So | Bergen Catholic | Taranto, Italy |
| F | 25 | James Demery | 6 ft 6 in (1.98 m) | 210 lb (95 kg) | Sr | Northside Christian | Greenville, NC |
| F | 32 | Jai Williams | 6 ft 9 in (2.06 m) | 235 lb (107 kg) | RS Sr | Philadelphia Electrical & Technical Charter | Philadelphia, PA |
| F | 33 | Taylor Funk | 6 ft 9 in (2.06 m) | 225 lb (102 kg) | Fr | Manheim Central | Lancaster, PA |

Head coach

- Phil Martelli (Widener)

Assistant coach(es)

- Mark Bass (Saint Joseph's)
- David Duda (Spring Garden)
- Geoff Arnold (Saint Joseph's)

Legend

- (C) Team captain
- (S) Suspended
- (I) Ineligible
- (W) Walk-on
- Injured
- Current redshirt

Roster

== Schedule and results ==
| Date time, TV | Rank^{#} | Opponent^{#} | Result | Record | High points | High rebounds | High assists | Site (attendance) city, state |
Regular season
| Nov 11, 2017*; 7:00 pm, ESPN3 | | at Toledo | L 87–98 | 0–1 | 21 – Newkirk | 6 – Tied | 4 – Robinson | Savage Arena (3,609); Toledo, OH |
| Nov 13, 2017*; 8:00 pm, NBCSP+ | | at UIC | W 86–82 ^{OT} | 1–1 | 25 – Demery | 9 – Funk | 5 – Tied | UIC Pavilion (3,175); Chicago, IL |
| Nov 17, 2017*; 7:00 pm | | Princeton | W 71–58 | 2–1 | 23 – Funk | 8 – Oliva | 3 – Oliva | Hagan Arena (4,121); Philadelphia, PA |
| Nov 23, 2017*; 6:30 pm, ESPN3 | | vs. Washington State; Wooden Legacy quarterfinals | L 71–75 | 2–2 | 24 – Newkirk | 10 – Oliva | 6 – Oliva | Titan Gym (2,131); Fullerton, CA |
| Nov 24, 2017*; 4:00 pm, ESPNews | | vs. Harvard; Wooden Legacy consolation 2nd round | L 71–77 | 2–3 | 18 – Demery | 10 – Demery | 3 – Tied | Titan Gym (2,513); Fullerton, CA |
| Nov 26, 2017*; 2:30 pm, ESPN3 | | vs. Sacramento State; Wooden Legacy 7th place game | W 74–69 | 3–3 | 22 – Newkirk | 9 – Edwards | 4 – Newkirk | Honda Center (1,733); Anaheim, CA |
| Nov 29, 2017*; 7:00 pm | | Bucknell | W 83–70 | 4–3 | 20 – Demery | 10 – Tied | 6 – Newkirk | Hagan Arena (3,783); Philadelphia, PA |
| Dec 2, 2017*; 5:30 pm, ESPN2 | | No. 4 Villanova; Big 5/Holy War | L 53–94 | 4–4 | 14 – Demery | 6 – Robinson | 3 – Robinson | Hagan Arena (4,200); Philadelphia, PA |
| Dec 9, 2017*; 2:30 pm, CBSSN | | at Temple; Big 5/Rivalry | L 78–81 | 4–5 | 18 – Newkirk | 11 – Oliva | 6 – Newkirk | Liacouras Center (7,288); Philadelphia, PA |
| Dec 17, 2017*; 4:30 pm | | Maine | W 72–59 | 5–5 | 19 – Tied | 10 – Demery | 4 – Newkirk | Hagan Arena (3,551); Philadelphia, PA |
| Dec 20, 2017*; 4:30 pm, ESPNU | | vs. St. John's; Basketball Hall of Fame Holiday Showcase | L 73–77 | 5–6 | 26 – Newkirk | 18 – Oliva | 4 – Oliva | Mohegan Sun Arena (5,518); Uncasville, CT |
| Dec 30, 2017; 4:00 pm | | at George Washington | L 64–70 | 5–7 (0–1) | 24 – Demery | 8 – Demery | 2 – Oliva | Charles E. Smith Center (2,225); Washington, DC |
| Jan 3, 2018; 7:00 pm | | VCU | W 87–81 ^{OT} | 6–7 (1–1) | 19 – Funk | 8 – Tied | 5 – Newkirk | Hagan Arena (3,518); Philadelphia, PA |
| Jan 6, 2018; 8:00 pm, ESPNU | | St. Bonaventure | W 85–78 | 7–7 (2–1) | 24 – Demery | 10 – Newkirk | 8 – Oliva | Hagan Arena (4,061); Philadelphia, PA |
| Jan 10, 2018; 7:00 pm | | at George Mason | L 79–81 | 7–8 (2–2) | 24 – Newkirk | 7 – Newkirk | 5 – Newkirk | EagleBank Arena (2,783); Fairfax, VA |
| Jan 14, 2018; 5:00 pm, NBCSN | | at Massachusetts | L 69–72 | 7–9 (2–3) | 22 – Tied | 7 – Tied | 7 – Longpre' | Mullins Center (2,476); Amherst, MA |
| Jan 17, 2018; 6:30 pm, CBSSN | | Dayton | W 81–65 | 8–9 (3–3) | 19 – Demery | 15 – Oliva | 3 – Oliva | Hagan Arena (3,251); Philadelphia, PA |
| Jan 20, 2018; 1:00 pm | | Fordham | W 68–46 | 9–9 (4–3) | 25 – Demery | 8 – Tied | 4 – Tied | Hagan Arena (3,634); Philadelphia, PA |
| Jan 24, 2018; 7:00 pm, CBSSN | | at St. Bonaventure | L 67–70 | 9–10 (4–4) | 13 – Tied | 7 – Tied | 5 – Robinson | Reilly Center (3,548); Olean, NY |
| Jan 27, 2018*; 7:00 pm, NBCSP | | at Penn; Big 5 | L 56–67 | 9–11 | 19 – Newkirk | 7 – Oliva | 3 – Oliva | Palestra (7,682); Philadelphia, PA |
| Jan 31, 2018; 7:00 pm | | Saint Louis | L 59–60 | 9–12 (4–5) | 21 – Funk | 6 – Newkirk | 6 – Robinson | Hagan Arena (3,143); Philadelphia, PA |
| Feb 3, 2018; 4:00 pm, CBSSN | | at La Salle; Big 5 | L 78–81 | 9–13 (4–6) | 30 – Newkirk | 11 – Demery | 4 – Newkirk | Tom Gola Arena (3,045); Philadelphia, PA |
| Feb 6, 2018; 7:00 pm, Stadium | | at Davidson | L 62–91 | 9–14 (4–7) | 16 – Newkirk | 6 – Robinson | 4 – Robinson | John M. Belk Arena (3,134); Davidson, NC |
| Feb 10, 2018; 4:00 pm | | Massachusetts | W 85–73 | 10–14 (5–7) | 22 – Funk | 9 – Newkirk | 7 – Newkirk | Hagan Arena (3,751); Philadelphia, PA |
| Feb 14, 2018; 7:00 pm | | at Fordham | W 71–55 | 11–14 (6–7) | 20 – Demery | 6 – Tied | 7 – Newkirk | Rose Hill Gymnasium (1,032); Bronx, NY |
| Feb 17, 2018; 6:00 pm | | Duquesne | W 82–75 | 12–14 (7–7) | 26 – Newkirk | 11 – Robinson | 10 – Newkirk | Hagan Arena (3,651); Philadelphia, PA |
| Feb 21, 2018; 7:00 pm | | George Mason | L 76–79 | 12–15 (7–8) | 23 – Newkirk | 13 – Funk | 3 – Tied | Hagan Arena (3,082); Philadelphia, PA |
| Feb 24, 2018; 7:00 pm, NBCSP+ | | at Richmond | W 72–70 | 13–15 (8–8) | 20 – Robinson | 8 – Robinson | 5 – Robinson | Robins Center (7,201); Richmond, VA |
| Feb 27, 2018; 7:00 pm, CBSSN | | at No. 17 Rhode Island | W 78–48 | 14–15 (9–8) | 21 – Demery | 7 – Demery | 7 – Newkirk | Ryan Center (7,186); Kingston, RI |
| Mar 3, 2018; 2:00 pm, Stadium | | La Salle | W 78–70 | 15–15 (10–8) | 18 – Demery | 7 – Oliva | 4 – Newkirk | Hagan Arena (4,200); Philadelphia, PA |
Atlantic 10 tournament
| Mar 9, 2018; 2:30 pm, NBCSN | (4) | vs. (5) George Mason; Quarterfinals | W 68–49 | 16–15 | 14 – Robinson | 10 – Funk | 5 – Newkirk | Capital One Arena (7,321); Washington, D.C. |
| Mar 10, 2018; 1:00 pm, CBSSN | (4) | vs. (1) Rhode Island; Semifinals | L 87–90 | 16–16 | 18 – Newkirk | 8 – Newkirk | 6 – Newkirk | Capital One Arena (8,756); Washington, D.C. |
*Non-conference game. ^{#}Rankings from AP Poll. (#) Tournament seedings in parentheses. All times are in Eastern Time.
