= Kellan Grady =

American basketball player (born 1997)

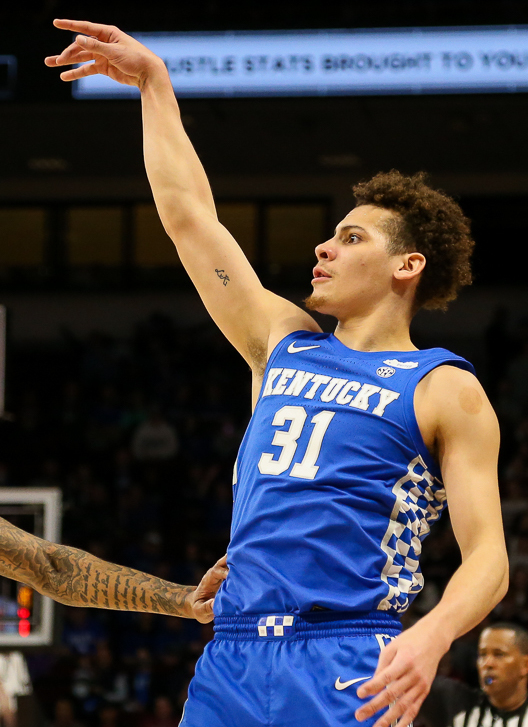
- Grady with Kentucky in 2022

Free Agent
- Position: Shooting guard

Personal information
- Born: September 11, 1997 (age 29) West Roxbury, Massachusetts, U.S.
- Listed height: 6 ft 5 in (1.96 m)
- Listed weight: 205 lb (93 kg)

Career information
- High school: Catholic Memorial (Boston, Massachusetts); Northfield Mount Hermon (Northfield, Massachusetts)
- College: Davidson (2017–2021); Kentucky (2021–2022)
- NBA draft: 2022: undrafted
- Playing career: 2022–present

Career history
- 2022–2023: Grand Rapids Gold
- 2023–2024: Chorale Roanne Basket
- 2024–2025: MHP Riesen Ludwigsburg
- 2025: Zastal Zielona Góra

Career highlights
- 2× First-team All-Atlantic 10 (2019, 2021); 2× Second-team All-Atlantic 10 (2018, 2020); Atlantic 10 Rookie of the Year (2018)
- Stats at NBA.com
- Stats at Basketball Reference

Kellan Grady (born September 11, 1997) is an American professional basketball player who last played for Zastal Zielona Góra in the Polish Basketball League (PLK). He played college basketball for the Kentucky Wildcats and the Davidson Wildcats.

== Early life ==
While growing up, Grady idolized Stephen Curry, following him on his NCAA Tournament run at Davidson and first several seasons with the Golden State Warriors. He briefly met Curry in 2011 and took a picture with him. Grady played three seasons at Catholic Memorial School and was named to the Boston Herald Dream Team. Grady was an all-state performer at Northfield Mount Hermon School, where he transferred after Catholic Memorial. He chose to go to Davidson, turning down offers from several other Atlantic 10 schools and a few Ivy League schools.

== College career ==
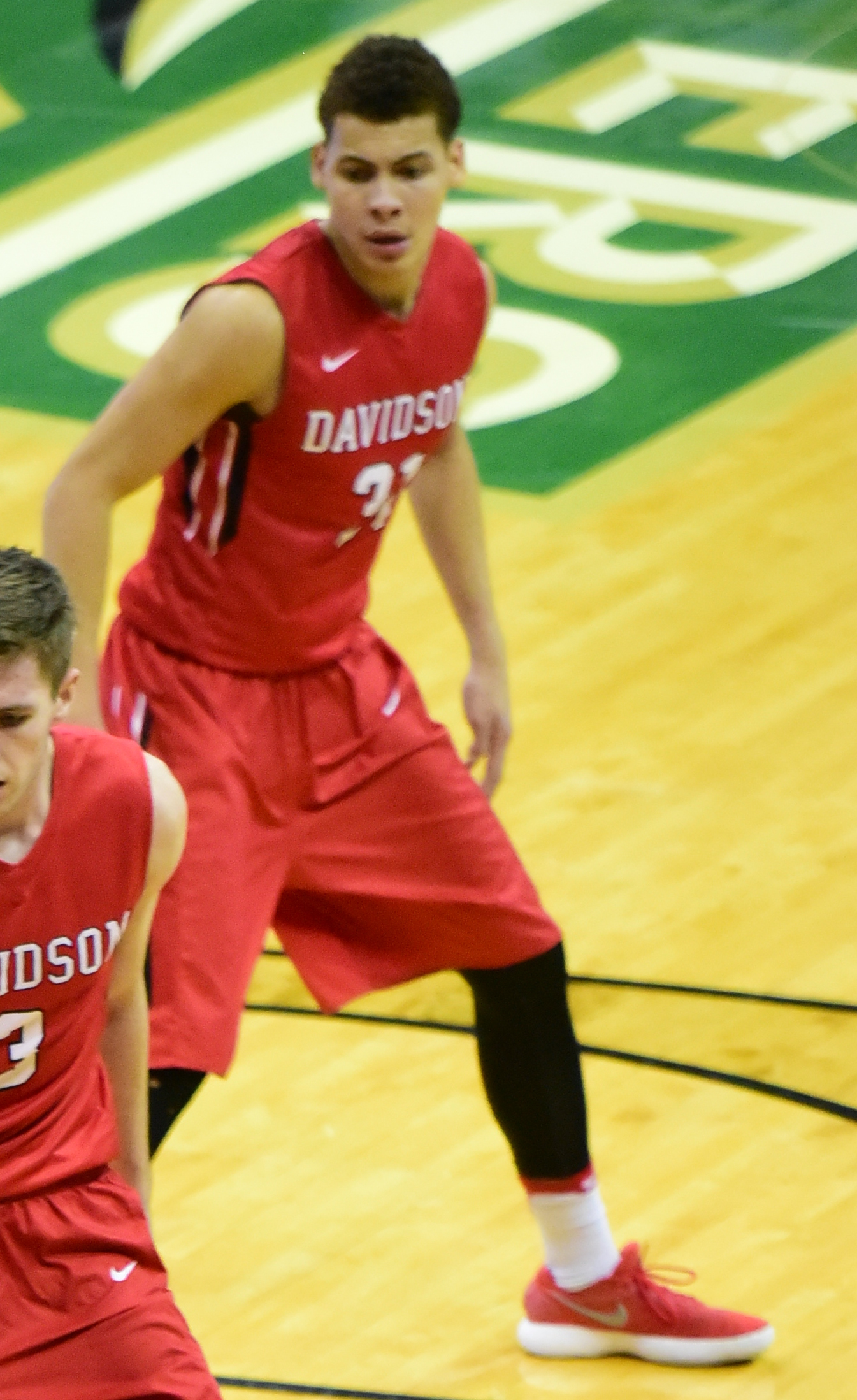
Grady with Davidson in 2017

In his first college game, Grady hit 7–of–10 3-pointers en route to scoring 23 points in a 110–62 win against Charleston Southern. On November 28, 2017, he had 22 points, five rebounds and two assists against Charlotte. Grady scored a career-high 39 points in a 115–113 triple overtime loss to St. Bonaventure on February 28, 2018. As a freshman, Grady was named Atlantic 10 Rookie of the Year as well as being named to the Second Team All-Atlantic 10. His teammate Peyton Aldridge was named co-player of the year. Grady averaged 18.0 points, 3.3 rebounds, and 1.9 assists per game as a freshman.

Coming into his sophomore season, Grady was named to the Preseason First Team All-Atlantic 10. He suffered a knee injury in December 2018 and missed four games. Grady averaged 17.3 points and 4.5 rebounds per game and helped Davidson claim a berth in the National Invitation Tournament. He was named to the First Team All-Atlantic 10, while teammate Jón Axel Guðmundsson earned player of the year honors. Following the season, Grady declared for the 2019 NBA draft but opted to return to Davidson.

Grady averaged 17.2 points and 4.2 rebounds per game, but posted 20.6 points per game in February and March. At the close of the regular season in his junior year, Grady was named to the Second Team All-Atlantic 10.

In his senior season, Grady averaged 17.1 points and 4.6 rebounds per game, earning First Team All-Atlantic 10 honors for the second time. He shot 38.2% from 3-point range, the best percentage of his career, and surpassed 2,000 points in an opening round NIT loss. Following the season, Grady announced that he would enter the transfer portal as a graduate student. On March 29, 2021, Grady committed to Kentucky.

== Professional career ==
=== Grand Rapids Gold (2022–2023) ===
On November 4, 2022, Grady was named to the opening night roster for the Grand Rapids Gold.

=== Chorale Roanne Basket (2023–2024) ===
On June 2, 2023, Grady signed with Chorale Roanne Basket of the LNB Pro A.

=== MHP Riesen Ludwigsburg (2024–2025) ===
On July 5, 2024, he signed with MHP Riesen Ludwigsburg of the Basketball Bundesliga (BBL).

=== Zastal Zielona Góra (2025–present) ===
On February 21, 2025, he signed with Zastal Zielona Góra in the Polish Basketball League (PLK).

== Career statistics ==
Legend
GP	Games played	GS	Games started	MPG	Minutes per game
FG%	Field goal percentage	3P%	3-point field goal percentage	FT%	Free throw percentage
RPG	Rebounds per game	APG	Assists per game	SPG	Steals per game
BPG	Blocks per game	PPG	Points per game	**Bold**	Career high

=== College ===
Year	Team	GP	GS	MPG	FG%	3P%	FT%	RPG	APG	SPG	BPG	PPG
2017–18	Davidson	33	32	35.2	**.501**	.372	**.804**	3.3	1.9	.8	.1	**18.0**
2018–19	Davidson	30	30	**37.6**	.451	.341	.735	4.5	1.9	1.0	**.2**	17.3
2019–20	Davidson	30	29	35.8	.463	.370	.797	4.2	**2.5**	**1.2**	**.2**	17.2
2020–21	Davidson	22	22	34.4	.471	.382	.676	**4.6**	2.4	.8	**.2**	17.1
2021–22	Kentucky	**34**	**34**	32.9	.446	**.415**	.744	2.1	1.3	.8	.1	11.4
Career		149	147	35.2	.467	.378	.760	3.6	2.0	.9	.1	16.0

=== NBA G League ===
Year	Team	GP	GS	MPG	FG%	3P%	FT%	RPG	APG	SPG	BPG	PPG
2022–23	Grand Rapids	24	18	34.6	.422	.345	.333	2.9	2.3	.9	.4	12.1
Career		24	18	34.6	.422	.345	.333	2.9	2.3	.9	.4	12.1

== Personal life ==
Grady's grandmother, Sophia Williams-De Bruyn, is a South African activist famous for leading anti-apartheid marches. Grady launched the College Athletes for Respect and Equality initiative in 2020, to raise awareness of racial injustice.
