= 2017–18 Fordham Rams men's basketball team =

American college basketball season

2017–18 Fordham Rams men's basketball
- Conference: Atlantic 10
- Record: 9–22 (4–14 A-10)
- Head coach: Jeff Neubauer (3rd season)
- Associate head coach: Rodney Crawford
- Assistant coaches: Ali Ton; Michael DePaoli
- Home arena: Rose Hill Gymnasium

2017–18 Atlantic 10 men's basketball standings
	Conf.				Overall
Team	W		L	PCT	W		L	PCT
Rhode Island	15	–	3	.833	26	–	8	.765
St. Bonaventure	14	–	4	.778	26	–	8	.765
Davidson †	13	–	5	.722	21	–	12	.636
Saint Joseph's	10	–	8	.556	16	–	16	.500
VCU	9	–	9	.500	18	–	15	.545
Saint Louis	9	–	9	.500	17	–	16	.515
George Mason	9	–	9	.500	16	–	17	.485
Richmond	9	–	9	.500	12	–	20	.375
Dayton	8	–	10	.444	14	–	17	.452
Duquesne	7	–	11	.389	16	–	16	.500
George Washington	7	–	11	.389	15	–	18	.455
La Salle	7	–	11	.389	13	–	19	.406
Massachusetts	5	–	13	.278	13	–	20	.394
Fordham	4	–	14	.222	9	–	22	.290
† 2018 A10 Tournament winner Rankings from AP poll

The 2017–18 Fordham Rams men's basketball team represented Fordham University during the 2017–18 NCAA Division I men's basketball season. The Rams, led by third-year head coach Jeff Neubauer, played their home games at Rose Hill Gymnasium in The Bronx, New York as a member of the Atlantic 10 Conference. They finished the season 9–22, 4–14 in A-10 play to finish in last place. They lost in the first round of the A-10 tournament to George Washington.

== Previous season ==
The Rams finished the 2016–17 season 13–19, 7–11 in A-10 play to finish in 10th place. In the A-10 tournament, they lost in the second round to George Mason.

== Offseason ==
=== Departures ===
Name	Number	Pos.	Height	Weight	Year	Hometown	Reason for departure
Antwoine Anderson	0	G	6'1"	190	RS Junior	Rochester, NY	Graduate transferred to Connecticut
Sinan Saglam	10	G	6'6"	195	Freshman	Istanbul, Turkey	Walk-on; didn't return
Matt Massimino	13	G	5'11"	170	Senior	New Hope, PA	Graduated
Javontae Hawkins	32	G	6'5"	211	RS Senior	Flint, MI	Graduated
Christian Sengfelder	43	F	6'7"	238	Junior	Leverkusen, Germany	Graduate transferred to Boise State

=== Incoming transfers ===
Name	Number	Pos.	Height	Weight	Year	Hometown	Previous School
Tre Evans	5	G	6'2"	185	Sophomore	Edmond, OK	Junior college transferred from Kilgore College
Erten Gazi	10	G	6'4"	212	Junior	Güzelyurt, Cyprus	Transferred from DePaul. Under NCAA transfer rules, Gazi will have to sit out the 2017–18 season. Will have two years of remaining eligibility.
Antown Portley	13	G	6'4"	165	Junior	Lancaster, TX	Transferred from Saint Peter's. Under NCAA transfer rules, Portley will have to sit out the 2017–18 season. Will have two years of remaining eligibility.
Prokop Slanina	24	C	6'10"	225	Junior	Brno, Czech Republic	Junior college transferred from ASA College

=== 2017 recruiting class ===
College recruiting information
Name	Hometown	School	Height	Weight	Commit date
Ivan Raut; SF	Kotor, Crna Gora	Beko Beograd	6 ft 7 in (2.01 m)	190 lb (86 kg)	Jul 11, 2017
Ivan Raut; SF	Recruit ratings: Scout: Rivals: (N/A)				
Overall recruit ranking:
Note: In many cases, Scout, Rivals, 247Sports, On3, and ESPN may conflict in their listings of height and weight.; In these cases, the average was taken. ESPN grades are on a 100-point scale.; Sources: "2017 Team Ranking". Rivals.

== Preseason ==
In a poll of the league's head coaches and select media members at the conference's media day, the Rams were picked to finish in 13th place in the A-10. Junior guard Joseph Chartouny was named to the conference's preseason third team.

== Roster ==
2017–18 Fordham Rams men's basketball team
Players
Coaches

Pos.	#	Name	Height	Weight	Year	Previous school	Hometown
G	0	Will Tavares	6 ft 6 in (1.98 m)	205 lb (93 kg)	Sr	Bishop Hendricken High School; Monroe Community College	Providence, Rhode Island
F	1	Chuba Ohams	6 ft 8 in (2.03 m)	205 lb (93 kg)	So	Wadleigh High School	Bronx, New York
G	2	Thomas Sanchez (W)	5 ft 9 in (1.75 m)	155 lb (70 kg)	Sr	Xavier High School	Maspeth, New York
G	3	Nemanja Zarkovic	6 ft 3 in (1.91 m)	195 lb (88 kg)	Sr	Collège Jean-de-Brébeuf	Montreal, Quebec, Canada
G	4	Brenton Petty (W)	5 ft 9 in (1.75 m)	150 lb (68 kg)	Sr	Woodrow Wilson Bosco High School	Washington, D.C.
F	5	Tre Evans	6 ft 2 in (1.88 m)	185 lb (84 kg)	So	Edmond Memorial High School; Kilgore College	Edmond, Oklahoma
G	10	Erten Gazi (redshirt)	6 ft 3 in (1.91 m)	205 lb (93 kg)	Jr	Istanbul Bostanci Doga College; DePaul	Güzelyurt, Cyprus
G	12	Joseph Chartouny	6 ft 3 in (1.91 m)	205 lb (93 kg)	Jr	Collège Jean-de-Brébeuf	Montreal, Quebec, Canada
G	13	Antwon Portley (redshirt)	6 ft 4 in (1.93 m)	195 lb (88 kg)	Jr	Lancaster High School; Saint Peter's	Lancaster, Texas
F	14	Chris Downing	6 ft 8 in (2.03 m)	235 lb (107 kg)	Jr	Don Bosco Prep	Orangeburg, New York
G	15	Cavit Havsa (W)	6 ft 4 in (1.93 m)	160 lb (73 kg)	So	Esenyurt Okyanus High School	Istanbul, Turkey
F	20	Ivan Raut	6 ft 7 in (2.01 m)	204 lb (93 kg)	Fr	None	Kotor, Montenegro
F	21	Jesse Bunting	6 ft 8 in (2.03 m)	225 lb (102 kg)	Jr	Tabor Academy	Plymouth, Massachusetts
G	23	Perris Hicks	6 ft 1 in (1.85 m)	180 lb (82 kg)	Sr	Pasadena High School; San Bernardino Valley College	Los Angeles, California
F	24	Prokop Slanina	6 ft 10 in (2.08 m)	225 lb (102 kg)	Jr	ASA College	Brno, Czech Republic
F	33	David Pekárek	6 ft 7 in (2.01 m)	210 lb (95 kg)	Jr	Get Better Academy	Olomouc, Czech Republic

Head coach

- Jeff Neubauer (La Salle)

Assistant coach(es)

- Rodney Crawford (Cincinnati)
- Ali Ton (Davidson)
- Michael DePaoli (College of Saint Rose)

Legend

- (C) Team captain
- (S) Suspended
- (I) Ineligible
- (W) Walk-on
- Injured
- Current redshirt

Roster

== Schedule and results ==
Date time, TV	Rank^{#}	Opponent^{#}	Result	Record	Site (attendance) city, state
Exhibition
Nov 3, 2017*; 7:00 pm		Fredonia	W 79–41		Rose Hill Gymnasium; Bronx, NY
Non-conference regular season
Nov 10, 2017*; 7:00 pm		Miami (OH); Jamaica Classic	L 54–55	0–1	Rose Hill Gymnasium (1,923); Bronx, NY
Nov 13, 2017*; 7:00 pm		LIU Brooklyn; Jamaica Classic	W 81–68	1–1	Rose Hill Gymnasium (1,107); Bronx, NY
Nov 17, 2017*; 6:00 pm, CBSSN		vs. Florida State; Jamaica Classic	L 43–67	1–2	Montego Bay Convention Centre (235); Montego Bay, Jamaica
Nov 19, 2017*; 7:30 pm, CBSSN		vs. Tulane; Jamaica Classic	L 55–63	1–3	Montego Bay Convention Centre (278); Montego Bay, Jamaica
Nov 26, 2017*; 2:00 pm		Manhattan	W 70–57	2–3	Rose Hill Gymnasium (1,823); Bronx, NY
Nov 29, 2017*; 7:00 pm		East Tennessee State	L 77–82	2–4	Rose Hill Gymnasium (1,158); Bronx, NY
Dec 2, 2017*; 2:00 pm		Maine	W 67–66 ^{OT}	3–4	Rose Hill Gymnasium (1,421); Bronx, NY
Dec 6, 2017*; 7:00 pm		Harvard	L 45–47	3–5	Rose Hill Gymnasium (1,012); Bronx, NY
Dec 9, 2017*; 3:00 pm		St. Francis Brooklyn	W 76–68	4–5	Rose Hill Gymnasium (1,578); Bronx, NY
Dec 12, 2017*; 7:00 pm, ESPNU		at Rutgers	L 63–75	4–6	Louis Brown Athletic Center (3,389); Piscataway, NJ
Dec 21, 2017*; 7:00 pm		Florida A&M	W 79–69	5–6	Rose Hill Gymnasium (847); Bronx, NY
Dec 23, 2017*; 12:00 pm, AT&T Pitt		at No. 10 West Virginia	L 69–86	5–7	WVU Coliseum (11,296); Morgantown, WV
Atlantic 10 regular season
Dec 30, 2017; 12:30 pm, NBCSN		at VCU	L 63–76	5–8 (0–1)	Siegel Center (7,637); Richmond, VA
Jan 3, 2018; 7:00 pm		Richmond	W 69–65 ^{OT}	6–8 (1–1)	Rose Hill Gymnasium (1,106); Bronx, NY
Jan 6, 2018; 3:30 pm, CBSSN		Duquesne	L 41–64	6–9 (1–2)	Rose Hill Gymnasium (1,805); Bronx, NY
Jan 10, 2018; 7:00 pm		at St. Bonaventure	L 61–77	6–10 (1–3)	Reilly Center (3,133); Olean, NY
Jan 14, 2018; 3:00 pm, NBCSN		Davidson	L 45–75	6–11 (1–4)	Rose Hill Gymnasium (1,734); Bronx, NY
Jan 17, 2018; 7:00 pm		at La Salle	L 67–75	6–12 (1–5)	Tom Gola Arena (1,458); Philadelphia, PA
Jan 20, 2018; 1:00 pm		at Saint Joseph's	L 46–68	6–13 (1–6)	Hagan Arena (3,634); Philadelphia, PA
Jan 24, 2018; 7:00 pm, Stadium		No. 24 Rhode Island	L 58–78	6–14 (1–7)	Rose Hill Gymnasium (2,015); Bronx, NY
Jan 27, 2018; 2:00 pm, NBCSN		Massachusetts	W 82–69	7–14 (2–7)	Rose Hill Gymnasium (2,234); Bronx, NY
Feb 3, 2018; 7:00 pm, FSMW+		at Saint Louis	L 50–73	7–15 (2–8)	Chaifetz Arena (7,312); St. Louis, MO
Feb 7, 2018; 7:00 pm		George Mason	W 67–66	8–15 (3–8)	Rose Hill Gymnasium (1,152); Bronx, NY
Feb 10, 2018; 12:00 pm		at Duquesne	W 80–57	9–15 (4–8)	Palumbo Center (2,871); Pittsburgh, PA
Feb 14, 2018; 7:00 pm		Saint Joseph's	L 55–71	9–16 (4–9)	Rose Hill Gymnasium (1,032); Bronx, NY
Feb 17, 2018; 7:00 pm		at Dayton	L 70–80	9–17 (4–10)	UD Arena (13,350); Dayton, OH
Feb 21, 2018; 7:00 pm		at Davidson	L 52–76	9–18 (4–11)	John M. Belk Arena (3,212); Davidson, NC
Feb 24, 2018; 4:00 pm		La Salle	L 60–73	9–19 (4–12)	Rose Hill Gymnasium (2,366); Bronx, NY
Feb 28, 2018; 7:00 pm		at George Washington	L 56–72	9–20 (4–13)	Charles E. Smith Center (2,463); Washington, D.C.
Mar 3, 2018; 2:00 pm		VCU	L 58–83	9–21 (4–14)	Rose Hill Gymnasium (2,325); Bronx, NY
Atlantic 10 tournament
Mar 7, 2018; 8:30 pm, Stadium	(14)	vs. (11) George Washington; First round	L 72–78	9–22	Capital One Arena (5,333); Washington, D.C.
*Non-conference game. ^{#}Rankings from AP Poll. (#) Tournament seedings in parentheses. All times are in Eastern Time.

== See also ==
- 2017–18 Fordham Rams women's basketball team
