= 2017–18 George Mason Patriots men's basketball team =

American college basketball season

2017–18 George Mason Patriots men's basketball
- Conference: Atlantic 10 Conference
- Record: 16–17 (9–9 A-10)
- Head coach: Dave Paulsen (3rd season)
- Assistant coaches: Dane Fischer; Aaron Kelly; Duane Simpkins
- Home arena: EagleBank Arena

2017–18 Atlantic 10 men's basketball standings
| | Conf. | | | | Overall |
| Team | W | | L | PCT | W | | L | PCT |
|---|---|---|---|---|---|---|---|---|
| Rhode Island | 15 | – | 3 | .833 | 26 | – | 8 | .765 |
| St. Bonaventure | 14 | – | 4 | .778 | 26 | – | 8 | .765 |
| Davidson † | 13 | – | 5 | .722 | 21 | – | 12 | .636 |
| Saint Joseph's | 10 | – | 8 | .556 | 16 | – | 16 | .500 |
| VCU | 9 | – | 9 | .500 | 18 | – | 15 | .545 |
| Saint Louis | 9 | – | 9 | .500 | 17 | – | 16 | .515 |
| George Mason | 9 | – | 9 | .500 | 16 | – | 17 | .485 |
| Richmond | 9 | – | 9 | .500 | 12 | – | 20 | .375 |
| Dayton | 8 | – | 10 | .444 | 14 | – | 17 | .452 |
| Duquesne | 7 | – | 11 | .389 | 16 | – | 16 | .500 |
| George Washington | 7 | – | 11 | .389 | 15 | – | 18 | .455 |
| La Salle | 7 | – | 11 | .389 | 13 | – | 19 | .406 |
| Massachusetts | 5 | – | 13 | .278 | 13 | – | 20 | .394 |
| Fordham | 4 | – | 14 | .222 | 9 | – | 22 | .290 |
† 2018 A10 Tournament winner Rankings from AP poll

The 2017–18 George Mason Patriots Men's basketball team represented George Mason University during the 2017–18 NCAA Division I men's basketball season. The season was the 52nd for the program, the third under head coach Dave Paulsen, and the fifth as members of the Atlantic 10 Conference The Patriots played their home games at EagleBank Arena in Fairfax, Virginia. They finished the season 16–17, 9–9 in A-10 play to finish in a four-way tie for fifth place. As the No. 5 seed in the A-10 tournament, they defeated Massachusetts in the second round before losing to Saint Joseph's in the quarterfinals.

== Previous season ==
The Patriots finished the 2016–17 season 20–14, 9–9 in A-10 play to finish in a tie for seventh place. As the No. 7 seed in the A-10 tournament, they defeated Fordham in the second round before losing in the quarterfinals to VCU. They were invited to the College Basketball Invitational where they lost in the first round to Loyola (MD).

== Offseason ==
=== Departures ===
| Name | Number | Pos. | Height | Weight | Year | Hometown | Notes |
|---|---|---|---|---|---|---|---|
| DeAndre Abram | 1 | F | 6'7" | 195 | Sophomore | Carrollton, TX | Transferred to University of Wisconsin–Milwaukee |
| Danny Dixon | 15 | F | 6'10" | 228 | Sophomore | Grosse Pointe South, MI | Transferred to University of Missouri–Kansas City |
| Jalen Jenkins | 31 | F | 6'7" | 246 | Senior | Brooklyn, NY | Graduated |
| Marquise Moore | 22 | G | 6'2" | 208 | Senior | Queens, NY | Graduated |
| Kameron Murrell | 2 | G | 6'2" | 197 | Sophomore | Long Beach, CA | Transferred to St. Thomas Aquinas College |
| Karmari Newman | 10 | G | 6'4" | 170 | Sophomore | Detroit, MI | Transferred to Oakland University |
| Daniel Relvao | 14 | F | 6'9" | 255 | RS Sophomore | Coimbra, Portugal | Left program for personal reasons |
| Myles Tate | 12 | G | 5'7" | 161 | Senior | Ashburn, VA | Graduated |
| Troy Temara | 25 | F | 6'8" | 238 | Sophomore | Syracuse, NY | Transferred to Palm Beach State College |

=== 2017 recruiting class ===
College recruiting information
| Name | Hometown | School | Height | Weight | Commit date |
|---|---|---|---|---|---|
| Greg Calixte; F | Mount Vernon, NY | Mount Vernon High School | 6 ft 8 in (2.03 m) | 230 lb (100 kg) | Apr 12, 2017 |
| Greg Calixte; F | Recruit ratings: Scout: | | | | |
| Javon Greene; G | McDonough, GA | Henry County High School | 6 ft 1 in (1.85 m) | 155 lb (70 kg) | Aug 5, 2016 |
| Javon Greene; G | Recruit ratings: No ratings found | | | | |
| Goanar Mar; F | Plymouth, MN | DeLaSalle High School | 6 ft 7 in (2.01 m) | 200 lb (91 kg) | Apr 30, 2016 |
| Goanar Mar; F | Recruit ratings: Scout: Rivals: | | | | |
Overall recruit ranking:
Note: In many cases, Scout, Rivals, 247Sports, On3, and ESPN may conflict in their listings of height and weight.; In these cases, the average was taken. ESPN grades are on a 100-point scale.; Sources: "ESPN". ESPN.; "2017 Team Ranking". Rivals.

== Preseason ==
In a poll of the league's head coaches and select media members at the conference's media day, the Patriots were picked to finish in 10th place in the A-10. Junior guard Otis Livingston II was named to the conference's preseason third team.

== Honors and awards ==
Atlantic 10 All-Conference 2nd Team

- Otis Livingston II

== Roster ==
2017–18 George Mason Patriots men's basketball team
Players
Coaches

| Pos. | # | Name | Height | Weight | Year | Previous school | Hometown |
|---|---|---|---|---|---|---|---|
| F | 0 | Goanar Mar | 6 ft 7 in (2.01 m) | 195 lb (88 kg) | Fr | DeLaSalle High School | Mankato, MN |
| G | 1 | Justin Kier | 6 ft 4 in (1.93 m) | 183 lb (83 kg) | So | Spotswood High School | Grottoes, VA |
| G | 2 | Zach Garrett (W) | 6 ft 4 in (1.93 m) | 202 lb (92 kg) | Fr | Heritage High School | Woodbridge, VA |
| G | 4 | Otis Livingston II | 5 ft 11 in (1.8 m) | 170 lb (77 kg) | Jr | Linden High School | Linden, NJ |
| G | 5 | Jaire Grayer | 6 ft 4 in (1.93 m) | 195 lb (88 kg) | Jr | IMG Academy | Flint, MI |
| F | 12 | A. J. Wilson | 6 ft 7 in (2.01 m) | 200 lb (91 kg) | RS Fr | Elev8 Prep Academy | Lanham, MD |
| G | 21 | Jack Tempchin | 5 ft 9 in (1.75 m) | 155 lb (70 kg) | RS Fr | Blake High School | Silver Spring, MD |
| G | 23 | Javon Greene | 6 ft 1 in (1.85 m) | 174 lb (79 kg) | Fr | Henry County High School | McDonough, GA |
| G | 24 | Nick Diclementi (W) | 6 ft 6 in (1.98 m) | 198 lb (90 kg) | Sr | Middleburg Academy | Leesburg, VA |
| F | 31 | Jarred Reuter (redshirt) | 6 ft 7 in (2.01 m) | 260 lb (118 kg) | Jr | Brewster Academy / UVA | Marion, MA |
| G | 32 | Ian Boyd | 6 ft 4 in (1.93 m) | 215 lb (98 kg) | So | Apex High School | Cary, NC |
| F | 33 | Greg Calixte | 6 ft 8 in (2.03 m) | 230 lb (104 kg) | Fr | Mount Vernon High School | Mount Vernon, NY |

Head coach

- Dave Paulsen (Williams)

Assistant coach(es)

- Dane Fischer (Ithaca)
- Aaron Kelly (Catholic)
- Duane Simpkins (Maryland)

Legend

- (C) Team captain
- (S) Suspended
- (I) Ineligible
- (W) Walk-on
- Injured
- Current redshirt

Roster

== Player statistics ==
| Player | GP | GS | MPG | FG% | 3FG% | FT% | RPG | APG | SPG | BPG | PPG |
|---|---|---|---|---|---|---|---|---|---|---|---|
| Otis Livingston II | 31 | 31 | 35.8 | .446 | .403 | .839 | 3.4 | 4.5 | 1.0 | 0.1 | 17.5 |
| Jaire Grayer | 30 | 30 | 30.2 | .412 | .365 | .745 | 7.1 | 1.4 | 1.3 | 0.8 | 12.6 |
| Justin Kier | 31 | 30 | 33.3 | .465 | .167 | .787 | 4.6 | 2.4 | 1.3 | 0.1 | 11.2 |
| Goanar Mar | 31 | 31 | 31.8 | .436 | .371 | .796 | 4.5 | 0.9 | 0.6 | 0.1 | 10.8 |
| Ian Boyd | 31 | 14 | 24.7 | .405 | .299 | .786 | 4.5 | 1.3 | 0.6 | 0.1 | 8.1 |
| Greg Calixte | 30 | 20 | 19.5 | .598 | .000 | .405 | 4.3 | 0.4 | 0.1 | 0.4 | 5.0 |
| Javon Greene | 31 | 0 | 16.9 | .341 | .224 | .641 | 2.8 | 0.9 | 0.7 | 0.2 | 4.2 |
| A.J. Wilson | 29 | 0 | 11.7 | .463 | .308 | .543 | 2.7 | 0.1 | 0.2 | 1.1 | 3.6 |
| Jack Tempchin | 4 | 0 | 1.3 | .000 | .000 | .667 | 0.5 | 0.3 | 0.0 | 0.0 | 1.0 |
| Zach Garrett | 4 | 0 | 1.3 | .000 | .000 | .000 | 0.0 | 0.0 | 0.0 | 0.0 | 0.0 |
| Nick DiClementi | 4 | 0 | 1.3 | .000 | .000 | .000 | 0.5 | 0.0 | 0.3 | 0.0 | 0.0 |

== Schedule and results ==
| Date time, TV | Rank^{#} | Opponent^{#} | Result | Record | High points | High rebounds | High assists | Site (attendance) city, state |
Non-conference regular season
| November 10, 2017*; 7:00 pm | | Lafayette | W 67–65 | 1–0 | 17 – Grayer | 9 – Grayer | 6 – Livingston II | EagleBank Arena (6,706); Fairfax, VA |
| November 12, 2017*; 2:00 pm, RSN | | at No. 16 Louisville | L 61–72 | 1–1 | 20 – Grayer | 10 – Grayer | 3 – Livingston II | KFC Yum! Center (18,304); Louisville, KY |
| November 16, 2017*; 7:00 pm | | Binghamton; Cancún Challenge campus game | W 69–57 | 2–1 | 19 – Livingston II | 10 – Grayer | 6 – Livingston II | EagleBank Arena (2,877); Fairfax, VA |
| November 18, 2017*; 6:00 pm | | Cal State Northridge; Cancún Challenge campus game | W 78–73 ^{OT} | 3–1 | 22 – Mar | 11 – Mar | 6 – Kier | EagleBank Arena (3,041); Fairfax, VA |
| November 21, 2017*; 6:00 pm, CBSSN | | vs. Louisiana Tech; Cancún Challenge Riviera Division semifinals | L 64–77 | 3–2 | 17 – Mar | 8 – Boyd/Grayer/Mar | 3 – Livingston II | Hard Rock Hotel Riviera Convention Center (842); Cancún, Mexico |
| November 22, 2017*; 6:00 pm, CBSSN | | vs. Fresno State; Cancún Challenge Riviera Division 3rd place game | L 73–79 | 3–3 | 18 – Boyd/Livingston II | 9 – Grayer | 3 – Livingston II | Hard Rock Hotel Riviera Convention Center (982); Cancún, Mexico |
| November 29, 2017*; 7:00 pm | | at James Madison | W 76–72 | 4–3 | 17 – Livingston II | 10 – Grayer | 8 – Livingston II | Convocation Center (2,965); Harrisonburg, VA |
| December 3, 2017*; 3:00 pm, SECN+ | | at Auburn | L 63–79 | 4–4 | 18 – Grayer | 11 – Grayer | 7 – Livingston II | Auburn Arena (6,164); Auburn, AL |
| December 6, 2017*; 7:00 pm, A-10 Network | | William & Mary | L 70–77 | 4–5 | 24 – Grayer | 7 – Grayer | 5 – Livingston II | Eaglebank Arena (3,406); Fairfax, VA |
| December 9, 2017*; 4:00 pm | | North Carolina Central | W 77–65 | 5–5 | 17 – Livingston II | 8 – Grayer | 5 – Kier | Eaglebank Arena (3,489); Fairfax, VA |
| December 12, 2017*; 7:00 pm | | Georgia Southern | L 51–74 | 5–6 | 13 – Wilson | 10 – Wilson | 2 – Boyd | Eaglebank Arena (2,607); Fairfax, VA |
| December 17, 2017*; 4:00 pm, Stadium | | Penn State | L 54–72 | 5–7 | 17 – Kier | 9 – Grayer | 1 – 6 tied | EagleBank Arena (5,439); Fairfax, VA |
| December 22, 2017*; 7:00 pm | | Morgan State | W 86–79 | 6–7 | 22 – Kier | 7 – Mar | 5 – Livingston II | EagleBank Arena (2,582); Fairfax, VA |
A-10 regular season
| December 30, 2017; 4:00 pm | | at Rhode Island | L 64–83 | 6–8 (0–1) | 15 – Kier | 8 – Kier | 3 – Kier | Ryan Center (6,383); Kingston, RI |
| January 3, 2018; 7:00pm | | at Massachusetts | W 80–72 ^{OT} | 7–8 (1–1) | 33 – Livingston II | 12 – Calixte | 9 – Livingston II | Mullins Center (2,243); Amherst, MA |
| January 7, 2018; 12:00 pm, NBCSN | | Davidson | L 59–86 | 7–9 (1–2) | 20 – Livingston II | 5 – Calixte/Kier | 3 – Kier/Livingston II | EagleBank Arena (3,023); Fairfax, VA |
| January 10, 2018; 7:00 pm | | Saint Joseph's | W 81–79 | 8–9 (2–2) | 25 – Livingston II | 10 – Kier | 7 – Kier | EagleBank Arena (2,783); Fairfax, VA |
| January 13, 2018; 2:30 pm, NBCSN | | Saint Louis | W 86–81 | 9–9 (3–2) | 26 – Livingston II | 7 – Grayer | 7 – Livingston II | EagleBank Arena (3,284); Fairfax, VA |
| January 17, 2018; 7:00 pm | | at George Washington; Revolutionary Rivalry | L 68–80 | 9–10 (3–3) | 17 – Mar | 10 – Grayer | 5 – Grayer | Charles E. Smith Center (2,215); Washington, D.C. |
| January 20, 2018; 4:30 pm, NBCSN | | at Duquesne | L 89–95 ^{2OT} | 9–11 (3–4) | 27 – Kier | 15 – Grayer | 6 – Livingston II | Palumbo Center (2,543); Pittsburgh, PA |
| January 27, 2018; 2:00 pm, CBSSN | | VCU; Rivalry | L 76–84 | 9–12 (3–5) | 23 – Livingston II | 13 – Grayer | 4 – Kier | EagleBank Arena (7,028); Fairfax, VA |
| January 31, 2018; 7:00 pm, Stadium | | St. Bonaventure | L 69–85 | 9–13 (3–6) | 30 – Livingston II | 6 – Calixte | 4 – Kier | EagleBank Arena (3,024); Fairfax, VA |
| February 3, 2018; 4:30 pm, NBCSN | | at Richmond | W 79–75 | 10–13 (4–6) | 22 – Livingston II | 9 – Mar | 6 – Livingston II | Robins Center (7,201); Richmond, VA |
| February 7, 2018; 7:00 pm | | at Fordham | L 66–67 | 10–14 (4–7) | 16 – Livingston II | 8 – Calixte/Kier | 7 – Livingston II | Rose Hill Gymnasium (1,152); Bronx, NY |
| February 10, 2018; 4:00 pm, Stadium | | George Washington; Revolutionary Rivalry | W 72–65 | 11–14 (5–7) | 14 – Livingston II | 12 – Grayer | 9 – Livingston II | EagleBank Arena (7,032); Fairfax, VA |
| February 14, 2018; 7:00 pm, MASN | | Dayton | W 85–67 | 12–14 (6–7) | 29 – Livingston II | 7 – Calixte | 6 – Kier/Livingston II | EagleBank Arena (3,047); Fairfax, VA |
| February 17, 2018; 2:00 pm | | at La Salle | L 62–69 | 12–15 (6–8) | 19 – Kier | 7 – Kier | 5 – Livingston II | Tom Gola Arena (2,891); Philadelphia, PA |
| February 21, 2018; 7:00 pm | | at Saint Joseph's | W 79–76 | 13–15 (7–8) | 19 – Kier | 6 – Livingston II/Mar | 2 – Livingston II/Mar | Hagan Arena (3,082); Philadelphia, PA |
| February 24, 2018; 6:00 pm, MASN | | Massachusetts | W 78–76 ^{OT} | 14–15 (8–8) | 22 – Livingston II | 10 – Grayer | 4 – Livingston II | EagleBank Arena (4,228); Fairfax, VA |
| February 28, 2018; 7:00 pm, MASN | | at VCU; Rivalry | W 81–80 | 15–15 (9–8) | 26 – Livingston II/Mar | 8 – Calixte | 5 – Livingston II | Siegel Center (7,637); Richmond, VA |
| March 3, 2018; 7:00 pm, MASN | | Richmond | L 79–93 | 15–16 (9–9) | 21 – Livingston II | 6 – Boyd | 5 – Livingston II | EagleBank Arena (5,895); Fairfax, VA |
A-10 tournament
| March 8, 2018; 2:30 pm, NBCSN | (5) | vs. (13) Massachusetts; Second round | W 80–75 | 16–16 | 21 – Livingston II | 9 – Wilson | 2 – Boyd/Greene/Livingston II | Capital One Arena (6,483); Washington, D.C. |
| March 9, 2018; 2:30 pm, NBCSN | (5) | vs. (4) Saint Joseph's; Quarterfinal | L 49–68 | 16–17 | 12 – Grayer | 13 – Grayer | 6 – Kier | Capital One Arena (7,321); Washington, DC |
*Non-conference game. ^{#}Rankings from AP Poll. (#) Tournament seedings in parentheses. All times are in Eastern Time.
