= 2017–18 Duquesne Dukes men's basketball team =

American college basketball season

2017–18 Duquesne Dukes men's basketball
- Conference: Atlantic 10 Conference
- Record: 16–16 (7–11 A-10)
- Head coach: Keith Dambrot (1st season)
- Assistant coaches: Rick McFadden; Terry Weigand; Charles Thomas; Carl Thomas
- Home arena: A. J. Palumbo Center (Capacity: 4,406)

2017–18 Atlantic 10 men's basketball standings
	Conf.				Overall
Team	W		L	PCT	W		L	PCT
Rhode Island	15	–	3	.833	26	–	8	.765
St. Bonaventure	14	–	4	.778	26	–	8	.765
Davidson †	13	–	5	.722	21	–	12	.636
Saint Joseph's	10	–	8	.556	16	–	16	.500
VCU	9	–	9	.500	18	–	15	.545
Saint Louis	9	–	9	.500	17	–	16	.515
George Mason	9	–	9	.500	16	–	17	.485
Richmond	9	–	9	.500	12	–	20	.375
Dayton	8	–	10	.444	14	–	17	.452
Duquesne	7	–	11	.389	16	–	16	.500
George Washington	7	–	11	.389	15	–	18	.455
La Salle	7	–	11	.389	13	–	19	.406
Massachusetts	5	–	13	.278	13	–	20	.394
Fordham	4	–	14	.222	9	–	22	.290
† 2018 A10 Tournament winner Rankings from AP poll

The 2017–18 Duquesne Dukes men's basketball team represented Duquesne University during the 2017–18 NCAA Division I men's basketball season. The Dukes, led by first-year head coach Keith Dambrot, played their home games at the A. J. Palumbo Center in Pittsburgh, Pennsylvania as members of the Atlantic 10 Conference. They finished the season 16–16, 7–11 in A-10 play to finish in a three-way tie for 10th place. As the No. 10 seed in the A-10 tournament, they lost Richmond in the second round.

== Previous season ==
The Dukes finished the 2016–17 season 10–22, 3–15 in A-10 play to finish in last place. In the A-10 tournament, they lost in the first round to Saint Louis.

On March 13, 2017, Duquesne fired head coach Jim Ferry after five seasons. The school then hired Akron head coach Keith Dambrot on March 28.

== Offseason ==
=== Departures ===
Name	Number	Pos.	Height	Weight	Year	Hometown	Reason for departure
Darius Lewis	00	C	6'11"	250	Senior	Lexington, KY	Graduated
Emile Blackman	5	G	6'3"	195	RS Senior	Dix Hills, NY	Graduated
Kale Abrahamson	14	F	6'8"	215	RS Senior	West Des Moines, IA	Graduated
Nakye Sanders	20	F	6'8"	225	Sophomore	Staten Island, NY	Transferred to Towson
David Haus	21	G	6'2"	185	Junior	Pittsburgh, PA	Walk-on; didn't return
Spencer Littleson	25	G	6'4"	195	Freshman	Rochester Hills, MI	Transferred to Toledo
Josh Steel	30	G	6'4"	195	Sophomore	Harlow, England	Walk-on; left the team for personal reasons
Isiaha Mike	45	F	6'8"	200	Freshman	Scarborough, ON	Transferred to SMU

=== Incoming transfers ===
Name	Number	Pos.	Height	Weight	Year	Hometown	Previous School
Chas Brown	0	F/C	6'8"	240	RS Senior	Baltimore, MD	Transferred from Coppin State. Will be eligible to play since Brown graduated from Coppin State.
Marko Krivacevic	22	F	6'9"	205	Junior	Szombathely, Hungary	Junior college transferred from Miami Dade College
Tavian Dunn-Martin		G	5'8"	160	Sophomore	Huntington, WV	Transferred from Akron. Under NCAA transfer rules, Dunn-Martin will have to sit out for the 2017–18 season. Will have three years of remaining eligibility.
Frankie Hughes		G	6'4"	192	Junior	Cleveland, OH	Transferred from Missouri. Under NCAA transfer rules, Frankie Hughes will have to sit out for the 2017–18 season. Will have two years of remaining eligibility.
Michael Hughes		F	6'9"	265	Sophomore	Liberty, MO	Transferred from Michigan. Under NCAA transfer rules, Michael Hughes will have to sit out for the 2017–18 season. Will have three years of remaining eligibility.
Craig Randall II		G	6'4"	184	Junior	Youngstown, OH	Transferred from Memphis. Under NCAA transfer rules, Randall II will have to sit out for the 2017–18 season. Will have two years of remaining eligibility.
Michael Weathers		G	6'2"	161	Sophomore	Overland Park, KS	Transferred from Miami (OH). Under NCAA transfer rules, Weathers will have to sit out for the 2017–18 season. Will have three years of remaining eligibility.

=== 2017 recruiting class ===
College recruiting information
Name	Hometown	School	Height	Weight	Commit date
Eric Williams Jr. SG	New Haven, MI	New Haven High School	6 ft 5 in (1.96 m)	175 lb (79 kg)	Apr 15, 2017
Eric Williams Jr. SG	Recruit ratings: Scout: Rivals: (NR)				
Tydus Verhoeven; PF	Manteca, CA	Manteca High School	6 ft 8 in (2.03 m)	205 lb (93 kg)	Apr 22, 2017
Tydus Verhoeven; PF	Recruit ratings: Scout: Rivals: (NR)				
Nicholas Kratholm; PF	Lexington, KY	IMG Academy	6 ft 7 in (2.01 m)	190 lb (86 kg)	Apr 20, 2017
Nicholas Kratholm; PF	Recruit ratings: Scout: Rivals: (NR)				
Overall recruit ranking:
Note: In many cases, Scout, Rivals, 247Sports, On3, and ESPN may conflict in their listings of height and weight.; In these cases, the average was taken. ESPN grades are on a 100-point scale.; Sources: "2017 Team Ranking". Rivals.

=== 2018 Recruiting class ===
College recruiting information (2018)
Name	Hometown	School	Height	Weight	Commit date
Gavin Bizeau #26 C	Plainfield, IN	Plainfield High School	6 ft 10 in (2.08 m)	181 lb (82 kg)	Aug 5, 2017
Gavin Bizeau #26 C	Recruit ratings: Scout: Rivals: (80)				
Dylan Swingle; PF	Bainbridge, OH	Paint Valley High School	6 ft 9 in (2.06 m)	275 lb (125 kg)	May 15, 2017
Dylan Swingle; PF	Recruit ratings: Scout: Rivals: 247Sports: (NR)				
Brandon Wade; PG	Ann Arbor, MI	Skyline High School	6 ft 1 in (1.85 m)	175 lb (79 kg)	Oct 1, 2017
Brandon Wade; PG	Recruit ratings: Scout: Rivals: (NR)				
Amari Kelly; PF	Norcross, GA	Meadowcreek High School	6 ft 7 in (2.01 m)	250 lb (110 kg)	Oct 6, 2017
Amari Kelly; PF	Recruit ratings: Scout: Rivals: (NR)				
Overall recruit ranking:
Note: In many cases, Scout, Rivals, 247Sports, On3, and ESPN may conflict in their listings of height and weight.; In these cases, the average was taken. ESPN grades are on a 100-point scale.; Sources: "2018 Team Ranking". Rivals.

== Preseason ==
In a poll of the league's head coaches and select media members at the conference's media day, the Dukes were picked to finish in last place in the A-10. Mike Lewis II was named to the conference's preseason third team.

== Roster ==
2017–18 Duquesne Dukes men's basketball team
Players
Coaches

Pos.	#	Name	Height	Weight	Year	Previous school	Hometown
F/C	0	Chas Brown	6 ft 8 in (2.03 m)	235 lb (107 kg)	RS Sr	Coppin State; Baltimore CC	Baltimore, Maryland
G	1	Mike Lewis II	6 ft 1 in (1.85 m)	185 lb (84 kg)	So	Chaminade	St. Louis, MO
G	2	Eric James	6 ft 6 in (1.98 m)	215 lb (98 kg)	Sr	Westerville	Westerville, OH
G	3	Tarin Smith	6 ft 2 in (1.88 m)	185 lb (84 kg)	RS Jr	Nebraska; St. Anthony	Ocean Township, NJ
G	4	Rene Castro	6 ft 2 in (1.88 m)	195 lb (88 kg)	RS Sr	Butler; Worcester Academy	Boston, MA
F	20	Kellon Taylor (W)	6 ft 5 in (1.96 m)	220 lb (100 kg)	So	DeMatha Catholic	Landover, MD
F	22	Marko Krivacevic	6 ft 9 in (2.06 m)	215 lb (98 kg)	Jr	Miami Dade College; Nikola Tesla	Szombathely, Hungary
F	25	Tydus Verhoeven	6 ft 8 in (2.03 m)	215 lb (98 kg)	Fr	Manteca	Manteca, CA
G	31	Caleb Davis (W)	6 ft 0 in (1.83 m)	175 lb (79 kg)	So	Valley	Pennsylvania, PA
F	32	Zach Snyder	6 ft 5 in (1.96 m)	210 lb (95 kg)	Jr	Seneca Valley	Cranberry Township, PA
F	34	Nicholas Kratholm	6 ft 8 in (2.03 m)	220 lb (100 kg)	Fr	IMG Academy	Louisville, KY
G	50	Eric Williams Jr.	6 ft 5 in (1.96 m)	190 lb (86 kg)	Fr	New Haven	New Haven, MI
C	55	Jordan Robinson	6 ft 8 in (2.03 m)	255 lb (116 kg)	RS Sr	Quality Education Academy	Toronto, ON
G		Tavian Dunn-Martin (redshirt)	5 ft 8 in (1.73 m)	155 lb (70 kg)	So	Akron; Huntington HS	Huntington, WV
G		Frankie Hughes (redshirt)	6 ft 4 in (1.93 m)	195 lb (88 kg)	So	Missouri; Garfield Heights HS	Cleveland, OH
C		Michael Hughes (redshirt)	6 ft 8 in (2.03 m)	255 lb (116 kg)	So	Akron; Liberty North HS	Liberty, MO
G		Craig Randall II (redshirt)	6 ft 4 in (1.93 m)	185 lb (84 kg)	Jr	Memphis; Shadow Mountain High School	Youngstown, OH
F		Marcus Weathers (redshirt)	6 ft 5 in (1.96 m)	205 lb (93 kg)	So	Shawnee Mission North	Overland Park, KS

Head coach

- Keith Dambrot (Akron)

Assistant coach(es)

- Rick McFadden (Akron)
- Terry Weigand (Ashland)
- Charles Thomas (Eastern Michigan)
- Carl Thomas (Eastern Michigan)

Legend

- (C) Team captain
- (S) Suspended
- (I) Ineligible
- (W) Walk-on
- Injured
- Current redshirt

Roster

== Schedule and results ==
Date time, TV	Rank^{#}	Opponent^{#}	Result	Record	Site (attendance) city, state
Non-conference regular season
Nov 11, 2017*; 5:30 pm		St. Francis Brooklyn	W 80–70	1–0	Palumbo Center (1,833); Pittsburgh, PA
Nov 14, 2017*; 7:00 pm		VMI	W 77–61	2–0	Palumbo Center (1,307); Pittsburgh, PA
Nov 19, 2017*; 5:30 pm		Robert Morris	L 59–66	2–1	Palumbo Center (1,481); Pittsburgh, PA
Nov 27, 2017*; 7:00 pm		Cornell	L 71–78	2–2	Palumbo Center (1,204); Pittsburgh, PA
Dec 1, 2017*; 7:00 pm, Stadium		vs. Pittsburgh; City Game	L 64–76	2–3	PPG Paints Arena (10,118); Pittsburgh, PA
Dec 4, 2017*; 7:00 pm		Maryland Eastern Shore	W 86–61	3–3	Palumbo Center (1,201); Pittsburgh, PA
Dec 6, 2017*; 8:00 pm		Stetson	W 73–59	4–3	Palumbo Center (1,191); Pittsburgh, PA
Dec 9, 2017*; 12:30 pm		Delaware State	W 97–48	5–3	Palumbo Center (1,213); Pittsburgh, PA
Dec 13, 2017*; 7:00 pm		Mississippi Valley State	W 73–49	6–3	Palumbo Center (1,175); Pittsburgh, PA
Dec 17, 2017*; 12:30 pm		North Carolina A&T; Las Vegas Classic	W 74–58	7–3	Palumbo Center (1,201); Pittsburgh, PA
Dec 19, 2017*; 7:00 pm		Lamar; Las Vegas Classic	W 65–64	8–3	Palumbo Center (1,156); Pittsburgh, PA
Dec 22, 2017*; 8:30 pm, FS2		vs. San Francisco; Las Vegas Classic	W 67–65	9–3	Orleans Arena; Paradise, NV
Dec 23, 2017*; 8:30 pm, FS1		vs. Southern Illinois; Las Vegas Classic	L 64–74	9–4	Orleans Arena; Paradise, NV
Atlantic 10 regular season
Dec 30, 2017; 4:00 pm, ATTSNP		Dayton	W 70–62	10–4 (1–0)	Palumbo Center (2,572); Pittsburgh, PA
Jan 3, 2018; 7:00 pm		George Washington	W 69–52	11–4 (2–0)	Palumbo Center (1,347); Pittsburgh, PA
Jan 6, 2018; 3:30 pm, CBSSN		at Fordham	W 64–41	12–4 (3–0)	Rose Hill Gymnasium (1,805); Bronx, NY
Jan 9, 2018; 8:00 pm, Stadium		at VCU	L 76–78	12–5 (3–1)	Siegel Center (7,637); Richmond, VA
Jan 13, 2018; 12:30 pm, NBCSN		La Salle	W 101–94 ^{3OT}	13–5 (4–1)	Palumbo Center (2,145); Pittsburgh, PA
Jan 17, 2018; 8:00 pm		at Saint Louis	L 63–76	13–6 (4–2)	Chaifetz Arena (5,227); St. Louis, MO
Jan 20, 2018; 4:30 pm, NBCSN		George Mason	W 95–89 ^{2OT}	14–6 (5–2)	Palumbo Center (2,543); Pittsburgh, PA
Jan 24, 2018; 7:00 pm, ATTSNP		Richmond	L 73–77 ^{OT}	14–7 (5–3)	Palumbo Center (1,786); Pittsburgh, PA
Jan 27, 2018; 12:00 pm, NBCSN		at No. 24 Rhode Island	L 58–61	14–8 (5–4)	Ryan Center (7,432); Kingston, RI
Jan 31, 2018; 7:00 pm		at George Washington	W 75–73	15–8 (6–4)	Charles E. Smith Center (2,412); Washington, D.C.
Feb 3, 2018; 6:30 pm, NBCSN		St. Bonaventure	L 81–84	15–9 (6–5)	Palumbo Center (3,411); Pittsburgh, PA
Feb 7, 2018; 7:00 pm		at Dayton	L 73–88	15–10 (6–6)	UD Arena (13,245); Dayton, OH
Feb 10, 2018; 12:00 pm, ATTSNP		Fordham	L 57–80	15–11 (6–7)	Palumbo Center (2,871); Pittsburgh, PA
Feb 17, 2018; 6:00 pm		at Saint Joseph's	L 75–82	15–12 (6–8)	Hagan Arena (3,651); Philadelphia, PA
Feb 21, 2018; 7:00 pm		at St. Bonaventure	L 67–73	15–13 (6–9)	Reilly Center (5,089); Olean, NY
Feb 24, 2018; 12:00 pm, ATTSNP		Davidson	L 60–71	15–14 (6–10)	Palumbo Center (2,555); Pittsburgh, PA
Feb 28, 2018; 7:00 pm, Stadium		Saint Louis	W 76–69	16–14 (7–10)	Palumbo Center (2,272); Pittsburgh, PA
Mar 3, 2018; 8:00 pm		at Massachusetts	L 75–85	16–15 (7–11)	Mullins Center; Amherst, MA
Atlantic 10 tournament
Mar 8, 2018; 6:00 pm, NBCSN	(10)	vs. (7) Richmond; Second round	L 68–81	16–16	Capital One Arena (6,514); Washington, D.C.
*Non-conference game. ^{#}Rankings from AP Poll. (#) Tournament seedings in parentheses. All times are in Eastern Time.

== See also ==
- 2017–18 Duquesne Dukes women's basketball team
