= 2017–18 La Salle Explorers men's basketball team =

American college basketball season

2017–18 La Salle Explorers men's basketball
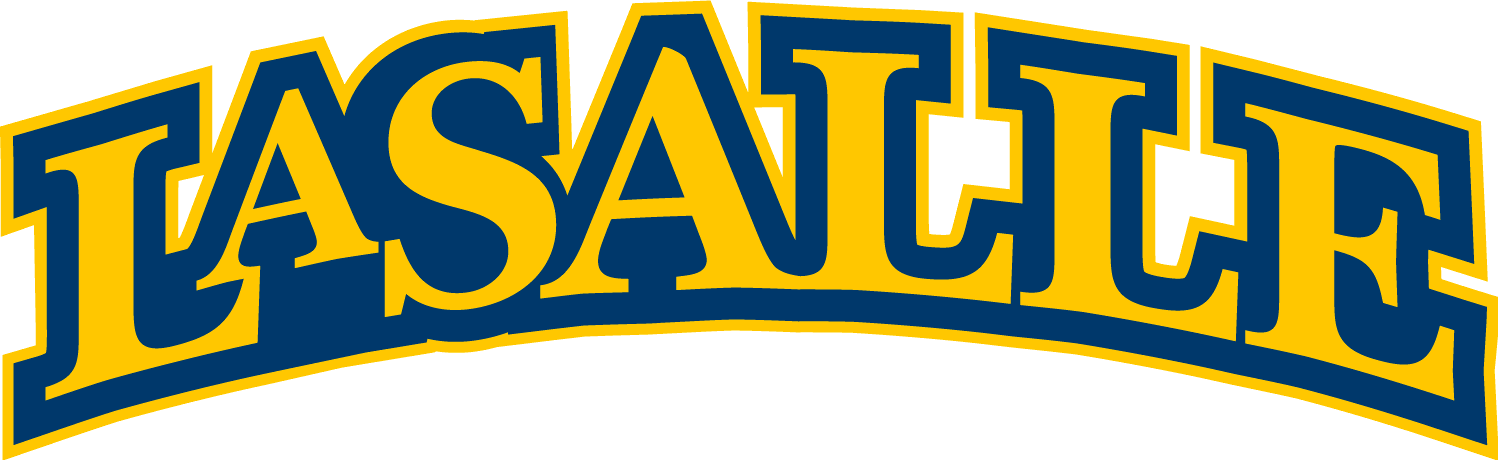
- Conference: Atlantic 10 Conference
- Record: 13–19 (7–11 A-10)
- Head coach: John Giannini (14th season)
- Assistant coaches: Horace Owens; Sean Neal; Donnie Carr
- Home arena: Tom Gola Arena

2017–18 Atlantic 10 men's basketball standings
	Conf.				Overall
Team	W		L	PCT	W		L	PCT
Rhode Island	15	–	3	.833	26	–	8	.765
St. Bonaventure	14	–	4	.778	26	–	8	.765
Davidson †	13	–	5	.722	21	–	12	.636
Saint Joseph's	10	–	8	.556	16	–	16	.500
VCU	9	–	9	.500	18	–	15	.545
Saint Louis	9	–	9	.500	17	–	16	.515
George Mason	9	–	9	.500	16	–	17	.485
Richmond	9	–	9	.500	12	–	20	.375
Dayton	8	–	10	.444	14	–	17	.452
Duquesne	7	–	11	.389	16	–	16	.500
George Washington	7	–	11	.389	15	–	18	.455
La Salle	7	–	11	.389	13	–	19	.406
Massachusetts	5	–	13	.278	13	–	20	.394
Fordham	4	–	14	.222	9	–	22	.290
† 2018 A10 Tournament winner Rankings from AP poll

The 2017–18 La Salle Explorers basketball team represented La Salle University during the 2017–18 NCAA Division I men's basketball season. The Explorers, led by 14th-year head coach John Giannini, played their home games at Tom Gola Arena in Philadelphia, Pennsylvania as members of the Atlantic 10 Conference. They finished the season 13–19, 7–11 in A-10 play to finish in a three-way tie for 10th place. As the No. 12 seed in the A-10 tournament, they lost in the first round to Massachusetts.

On March 23, 2018, head coach John Giannini and the school mutually agreed to part ways after 14 seasons. Giannini left with a 212–226 record at La Salle. On April 8, the school hired Villanova assistant Ashley Howard as head coach.

== Previous season ==
The Explorers finished the 2016–17 season 15–15, 9–9 in A-10 play to finish in a tie for seventh place. As the No. 8 seed in the A-10 tournament, they lost to Davidson in the first round.

== Offseason ==
=== Departures ===
Name	Number	Pos.	Height	Weight	Year	Hometown	Reason for departure
Cleon Roberts	3	G	6'6"	190	RS Senior	Miami, FL	Graduated
Hank Davis	4	G	5'11"	170	Senior	Cherry Hill, NJ	Graduated
Yevgen Sakhniuk	12	F	6'7"	235	Junior	Kyiv, Ukraine	Transferred to Philadelphia
Jordan Price	21	G	6'5"	220	RS Senior	Decatur, GA	Graduated
Demetrius Henry	24	F/C	6'9"	225	RS Junior	Fort Lauderdale, FL	Left the program

=== Incoming transfers ===
Name	Number	Pos.	Height	Weight	Year	Hometown	Previous School
Traci Carter	24	G	6'0"	175	Junior	Philadelphia, PA	Marquette

=== 2017 recruiting class ===
College recruiting information
Name	Hometown	School	Height	Weight	Commit date
Jamir Moultrie #70 PG	Bishop McNamara High School	Forestville, MD	6 ft 1 in (1.85 m)	178 lb (81 kg)	Oct 28, 2016
Jamir Moultrie #70 PG	Recruit ratings: Scout: Rivals: (72)				
Miles Brookins #81 PF	Mater Dei High School	Santa Ana, CA	6 ft 8 in (2.03 m)	210 lb (95 kg)	Oct 12, 2016
Miles Brookins #81 PF	Recruit ratings: Scout: Rivals: (69)				
Dajour Joseph; SF	Lauderdale Lakes, FL	Combine Prep Academy	6 ft 6 in (1.98 m)	210 lb (95 kg)	Oct 31, 2016
Dajour Joseph; SF	Recruit ratings: Scout: Rivals: (NR)				
Overall recruit ranking:
Note: In many cases, Scout, Rivals, 247Sports, On3, and ESPN may conflict in their listings of height and weight.; In these cases, the average was taken. ESPN grades are on a 100-point scale.; Sources: "2017 Team Ranking". Rivals.

=== 2018 recruiting class ===
College recruiting information (2018)
Name	Hometown	School	Height	Weight	Commit date
Jared Kimbrough #62 C	Neptune, NJ	Neptune High School	6 ft 7 in (2.01 m)	N/A	Sep 9, 2017
Jared Kimbrough #62 C	Recruit ratings: Scout: Rivals: (70)				
Jack Clark; SF	Wyncote, PA	Cheltenham High School	6 ft 5 in (1.96 m)	220 lb (100 kg)	Oct 5, 2017
Jack Clark; SF	Recruit ratings: Scout: Rivals: (NR)				
Overall recruit ranking:
Note: In many cases, Scout, Rivals, 247Sports, On3, and ESPN may conflict in their listings of height and weight.; In these cases, the average was taken. ESPN grades are on a 100-point scale.; Sources: "2018 Team Ranking". Rivals.

== Preseason ==
In a poll of the league’s head coaches and select media members at the conference's media day, the Hawks were picked to finish in ninth place in the A-10. Senior forward B.J. Johnson was named to the conference's preseason second team.

== Roster ==
2017–18 La Salle Explorers men's basketball team
Players
Coaches

Pos.	#	Name	Height	Weight	Year	Previous school	Hometown
G	0	Pookie Powell	6 ft 0 in (1.83 m)	180 lb (82 kg)	RS Jr	Dr. Philips; Memphis	Orlando, FL
G	1	Johnnie Shuler	5 ft 11 in (1.8 m)	175 lb (79 kg)	Sr	Theodore Roosevelt	Washington, D.C.
G	2	Amar Stukes	6 ft 2 in (1.88 m)	190 lb (86 kg)	RS Sr	La Salle College HS	Philadelphia, PA
G	3	Jamir Moultrie	6 ft 1 in (1.85 m)	170 lb (77 kg)	Fr	Bishop McNamara	Washington, D.C.
F/C	4	Miles Brookins	6 ft 10 in (2.08 m)	207 lb (94 kg)	Fr	Mater Dei	Cypress, CA
C	5	Tony Washington	6 ft 10 in (2.08 m)	230 lb (104 kg)	RS Sr	The Miller School (VA)	Detroit, MI
G	10	Isiah Deas	6 ft 6 in (1.98 m)	185 lb (84 kg)	So	Coastal Academy (NJ)	Brooklyn, NY
G	13	Saul Phiri	6 ft 4 in (1.93 m)	210 lb (95 kg)	So	Putnam Science Academy (CT)	Haverhill, MA
G/F	20	B. J. Johnson	6 ft 7 in (2.01 m)	200 lb (91 kg)	RS Sr	Lower Merion; Syracuse	Philadelphia, PA
G/F	23	Dajour Joseph	6 ft 6 in (1.98 m)	207 lb (94 kg)	Fr	Combine Academy (NC)	Haverhill, MA
G	25	Traci Carter (redshirt)	6 ft 1 in (1.85 m)	175 lb (79 kg)	Jr	Life Center Academy (NJ); Marquette	Philadelphia, PA
C	31	Cian Sullivan	7 ft 2 in (2.18 m)	215 lb (98 kg)	RS Fr	St. Andrews Prep (RI)	Tralee, Ireland

Head coach

- John Giannini (North Central (IL))

Assistant coach(es)

- Horace Owens (Rhode Island)
- Sean Neal (La Salle)
- Donnie Carr (La Salle)

Legend

- (C) Team captain
- (S) Suspended
- (I) Ineligible
- (W) Walk-on
- Injured
- Current redshirt

Roster

== Schedule and results ==
Date time, TV	Rank^{#}	Opponent^{#}	Result	Record	Site (attendance) city, state
Exhibition
Nov 2, 2017*; 7:30 pm		at No. 23 Seton Hall; Charity Exhibition	L 74–87		Walsh Gymnasium (1,140); South Orange, NJ
Nov 4, 2017*; 2:00 pm		Shippensburg	W 74–60		Tom Gola Arena; Philadelphia, PA
Non-conference regular season
Nov 11, 2017*; 3:00 pm		Saint Peter's; Hall of Fame Tip Off	W 61–40	1–0	Tom Gola Arena (2,822); Philadelphia, PA
Nov 13, 2017*; 7:00 pm, NBCSP		at Penn; Big 5	W 75–71 ^{2OT}	2–0	Palestra (2,073); Philadelphia, PA
Nov 16, 2017*; 7:00 pm		South Alabama; Hall of Fame Tip Off	W 81–73	3–0	Tom Gola Arena (1,488); Philadelphia, PA
Nov 18, 2017*; 2:30 pm, ESPN3		vs. No. 20 Northwestern; Hall of Fame Tip Off Naismith Bracket semifinals	L 74–82	3–1	Mohegan Sun Arena; Uncasville, CT
Nov 19, 2017*; 3:00 pm, ESPN2		vs. Boston College; Hall of Fame Tip Off Naismith Bracket third place game	L 61–82	3–2	Mohegan Sun Arena; Uncasville, CT
Nov 22, 2017*; 6:00 pm		vs. No. 11 Miami (FL); Reading Showcase	L 46–57	3–3	Santander Arena (6,735); Reading, PA
Nov 26, 2017*; 5:00 pm, NBCSN		Temple; Big 5	W 87–83	4–3	Tom Gola Arena (2,855); Philadelphia, PA
Dec 1, 2017*; 2:00 pm, CBSSN		vs. Towson; Hall of Fame Belfast Classic semifinals	L 60–67	4–4	SSE Arena (5,256); Belfast, Northern Ireland
Dec 2, 2017*; 9:30 am, CBSSN		vs. Holy Cross; Hall of Fame Belfast Classic 3rd place game	W 58–54	5–4	SSE Arena (3,882); Belfast, Northern Ireland
Dec 7, 2017*; 7:00 pm		Drexel	L 70–72	5–5	Tom Gola Arena (1,451); Philadelphia, PA
Dec 10, 2017*; 12:00 pm, FS1		at No. 4 Villanova; Big 5	L 68–77	5–6	Wells Fargo Center (10,611); Philadelphia, PA
Dec 17, 2017*; 4:30 pm		Mercer	W 95–85	6–6	Tom Gola Arena (1,251); Philadelphia, PA
Dec 22, 2017*; 7:00 pm		at Bucknell	L 81–87	6–7	Sojka Pavilion (2,553); Lewisburg, PA
Atlantic 10 regular season
Dec 30, 2017; 2:00 pm		Saint Louis	W 83–60	7–7 (1–0)	Tom Gola Arena (1,437); Philadelphia, PA
Jan 3, 2018; 7:00 pm		at Rhode Island	L 62–74	7–8 (1–1)	Ryan Center (4,549); Kingston, RI
Jan 6, 2018; 2:00 pm, NBCSN		VCU	L 74–80	7–9 (1–2)	Tom Gola Arena (2,312); Philadelphia, PA
Jan 10, 2018; 7:00 pm, NBCSN		at Massachusetts	L 79–86 ^{OT}	7–10 (1–3)	Mullins Center (2,056); Amherst, MA
Jan 13, 2018; 12:30 pm, NBCSN		at Duquesne	L 94–101 ^{3OT}	7–11 (1–4)	Palumbo Center (2,145); Pittsburgh, PA
Jan 17, 2018; 7:00 pm		Fordham	W 75–67	8–11 (2–4)	Tom Gola Arena (1,458); Philadelphia, PA
Jan 20, 2018; 2:30 pm, NBCSN		at Richmond	L 74–81	8–12 (2–5)	Robins Center (6,686); Richmond, VA
Jan 24, 2018; 7:00 pm		Massachusetts	W 87–72	9–12 (3–5)	Tom Gola Arena (1,214); Philadelphia, PA
Jan 31, 2018; 7:00 pm, Stadium		at Davidson	L 65–84	9–13 (3–6)	John M. Belk Arena (3,248); Davidson, NC
Feb 3, 2018; 4:00 pm, CBSSN		Saint Joseph's; Big 5	W 81–78	10–13 (4–6)	Tom Gola Arena (3,045); Philadelphia, PA
Feb 7, 2018; 7:00 pm		at George Washington	L 69–80	10–14 (4–7)	Charles E. Smith Center (2,017); Washington, DC
Feb 10, 2018; 8:00 pm		at Saint Louis	L 62–70	10–15 (4–8)	Chaifetz Arena (5,229); St. Louis, MO
Feb 13, 2018; 7:00 pm		St. Bonaventure	L 68–79	10–16 (4–9)	Tom Gola Arena (1,312); Philadelphia, PA
Feb 17, 2018; 2:00 pm		George Mason	W 69–62	11–16 (5–9)	Tom Gola Arena (2,801); Philadelphia, PA
Feb 20, 2018; 7:00 pm, CBSSN		No. 18 Rhode Island	L 93–95 ^{OT}	11–17 (5–10)	Tom Gola Arena (1,841); Philadelphia, PA
Feb 24, 2018; 2:00 pm		at Fordham	W 73–60	12–17 (6–10)	Rose Hill Gymnasium (2,366); Bronx, NY
Feb 28, 2018; 7:00 pm		Dayton	W 71–53	13–17 (7–10)	Tom Gola Arena (1,378); Philadelphia, PA
Mar 3, 2018; 2:00 pm, Stadium		at Saint Joseph's; Big 5	L 70–78	13–18 (7–11)	Hagan Arena (4,200); Philadelphia, PA
Atlantic 10 tournament
Mar 7, 2018; 6:00 pm, Stadium	(12)	vs. (13) Massachusetts; First round	L 67–69	13–19	Capital One Arena (5,333); Washington, DC
*Non-conference game. ^{#}Rankings from AP Poll. (#) Tournament seedings in parentheses. All times are in Eastern Time.
