= 2017–18 Davidson Wildcats men's basketball team =

American college basketball season

2017–18 Davidson Wildcats men's basketball

Atlantic 10 tournament champions

NCAA tournament, First Round
- Conference: Atlantic 10 Conference
- Record: 21–12 (13–5 A-10)
- Head coach: Bob McKillop (29th season)
- Assistant coaches: Matt McKillop; Ryan Mee; Will Reigel
- Home arena: John M. Belk Arena

2017–18 Atlantic 10 men's basketball standings
	Conf.				Overall
Team	W		L	PCT	W		L	PCT
Rhode Island	15	–	3	.833	26	–	8	.765
St. Bonaventure	14	–	4	.778	26	–	8	.765
Davidson †	13	–	5	.722	21	–	12	.636
Saint Joseph's	10	–	8	.556	16	–	16	.500
VCU	9	–	9	.500	18	–	15	.545
Saint Louis	9	–	9	.500	17	–	16	.515
George Mason	9	–	9	.500	16	–	17	.485
Richmond	9	–	9	.500	12	–	20	.375
Dayton	8	–	10	.444	14	–	17	.452
Duquesne	7	–	11	.389	16	–	16	.500
George Washington	7	–	11	.389	15	–	18	.455
La Salle	7	–	11	.389	13	–	19	.406
Massachusetts	5	–	13	.278	13	–	20	.394
Fordham	4	–	14	.222	9	–	22	.290
† 2018 A10 Tournament winner Rankings from AP poll

The 2017–18 Davidson Wildcats men's basketball team represented Davidson College during the 2017–18 NCAA Division I men's basketball season. The Wildcats were led by 29th-year head coach Bob McKillop and played their home games at the John M. Belk Arena in Davidson, North Carolina as fourth-year members of the Atlantic 10 Conference. They finished the season 21–12, 13–5 in the A-10 to finish in third place. In the A-10 tournament they defeated Saint Louis, St. Bonaventure, and Rhode Island to be A-10 Tournament champions. They received the A-10's automatic bid to the NCAA tournament where they lost in the first round to Kentucky.

== Previous season ==
The Wildcats finished the 2016–17 season 17–15, 8–10 in A-10 play to finish in ninth place. In the A-10 tournament, they defeated La Salle and Dayton to advance to the tournament semifinals where they lost to Rhode Island.

== Offseason ==
=== Departures ===
Name	Number	Pos.	Height	Weight	Year	Hometown	Reason for departure
Jack Gibbs	12	G	6'0"	195	Senior	Westerville, OH	Graduated
Kamau Faines	13	G	6'2"	200	Junior	Chicago, IL	Walk-on; didn't return
Manu Giamoukis	31	G	6'1"	200	Senior	Thessaloniki, Greece	Graduated
Connor Perkey	34	F	6'8"	215	RS Senior	Atlanta, GA	Graduated
Andrew McAuliffe	40	F	6'8"	260	Senior	Northbrook, IL	Graduated

=== 2017 recruiting class ===
College recruiting information
Name	Hometown	School	Height	Weight	Commit date
Kellan Grady #42 PG	West Roxbury, MA	Northfield Mt. Hermon School	6 ft 4 in (1.93 m)	160 lb (73 kg)	Apr 12, 2016
Kellan Grady #42 PG	Recruit ratings: Scout: Rivals: 247Sports: ESPN:				
Carter Collins; PG	Chapel Hill, NC	East Chapel Hill High School	6 ft 3 in (1.91 m)	N/A	
Carter Collins; PG	Recruit ratings: No ratings found				
Luke Frampton; SG	Poca, WV	Poca High School	6 ft 5 in (1.96 m)	200 lb (91 kg)	
Luke Frampton; SG	Recruit ratings: No ratings found				
Overall recruit ranking:
Note: In many cases, Scout, Rivals, 247Sports, On3, and ESPN may conflict in their listings of height and weight.; In these cases, the average was taken. ESPN grades are on a 100-point scale.; Sources: "2017 Team Ranking". Rivals.

== Preseason ==
In a poll of the league's head coaches and select media members at the conference's media day, the Wildcats were picked to finish in sixth place in the A-10. Senior forward Peyton Aldridge was named to the conference's preseason first team.

== Roster ==
2017–18 Davidson Wildcats men's basketball team
Players
Coaches

Pos.	#	Name	Height	Weight	Year	Previous school	Hometown
F	0	Dusan Kovacevic	6 ft 10 in (2.08 m)	245 lb (111 kg)	RS So	Rabun Gap-Nacoochee School	Novi Sad, Serbia
F	1	Nathan Ekwu	6 ft 7 in (2.01 m)	235 lb (107 kg)	Sr	Cardinal Hayes High School	Enugu, Nigeria
G	2	Jordan Watkins	6 ft 1 in (1.85 m)	165 lb (75 kg)	Sr	Providence Day School	Charlotte, North Carolina
G	3	Jón Axel Guðmundsson	6 ft 4 in (1.93 m)	190 lb (86 kg)	So	Fjölbrautaskóli Suðurnesja	Grindavík, Iceland
G	4	Cal Freundlich (W)	6 ft 2 in (1.88 m)	155 lb (70 kg)	So	Friends Seminary	New York, New York
G	5	Malcolm Wynter (W)	5 ft 10 in (1.78 m)	155 lb (70 kg)	So	Harborfields High School	Greenlawn, New York
G	14	Michael Brown (W)	5 ft 10 in (1.78 m)	165 lb (75 kg)	So	Saint Francis Academy	Gainesville, Florida
F	15	Oskar Michelsen	6 ft 9 in (2.06 m)	220 lb (100 kg)	Sr	Makelanrinne Sports High School	Helsinki, Finland
G	20	KiShawn Pritchett	6 ft 6 in (1.98 m)	225 lb (102 kg)	RS So	Lake Norman High School	Mooresville, North Carolina
F	22	Will Magarity	6 ft 11 in (2.11 m)	250 lb (113 kg)	RS Sr	Boston College	Stockholm, Sweden
F	23	Peyton Aldridge	6 ft 8 in (2.03 m)	225 lb (102 kg)	Sr	LaBrae High School	Leavittsville, Ohio
G	24	Carter Collins	6 ft 3 in (1.91 m)	180 lb (82 kg)	Fr	East Chapel Hill High School	Chapel Hill, North Carolina
F	25	Bates Jones (W)	6 ft 8 in (2.03 m)	200 lb (91 kg)	Fr	Charlotte Latin School	Charlotte, North Carolina
G	31	Kellan Grady	6 ft 5 in (1.96 m)	195 lb (88 kg)	Fr	Northfield Mount Hermon School	Boston, Massachusetts
G	32	Rusty Reigel	6 ft 2 in (1.88 m)	205 lb (93 kg)	Sr	Charlotte Latin School	Charlotte, North Carolina
G	34	Luke Frampton	6 ft 5 in (1.96 m)	200 lb (91 kg)	Fr	Poca High School	Poca, West Virginia

Head coach

- Bob McKillop (Hofstra)

Assistant coach(es)

- Matt McKillop (Davidson)
- Ryan Mee (University of Rochester
- Will Reigel (Davidson)

Legend

- (C) Team captain
- (S) Suspended
- (I) Ineligible
- (W) Walk-on
- Injured
- Current redshirt

Roster

== Schedule and results ==
Date time, TV	Rank^{#}	Opponent^{#}	Result	Record	Site (attendance) city, state
Exhibition
Nov 3, 2017*; 7:30 pm		Hampden–Sydney	W 106–55		John M. Belk Arena (2,864); Davidson, NC
Non-conference regular season
Nov 10, 2017*; 7:00 pm		Charleston Southern	W 110–62	1–0	John M. Belk Arena (3,705); Davidson, NC
Nov 14, 2017*; 7:00 pm		UNC Wilmington	W 108–81	2–0	John M. Belk Arena (3,252); Davidson, NC
Nov 21, 2017*; 10:00 pm, ATTSN		at Nevada	L 68–81	2–1	Lawlor Events Center (8,225); Reno, NV
Nov 25, 2017*; 7:00 pm		at Appalachian State	L 62–79	2–2	Holmes Center (1,216); Boone, NC
Nov 28, 2017*; 7:00 pm, Stadium		at Charlotte	W 85–70	3–2	Dale F. Halton Arena (4,418); Charlotte, NC
Dec 1, 2017*; 8:00 pm, ESPN2		vs. No. 13 North Carolina; Charlotte Showcase	L 75–85	3–3	Spectrum Center (11,395); Charlotte, NC
Dec 5, 2017*; 7:00 pm		VMI	W 74–51	4–3	John M. Belk Arena; Davidson, NC
Dec 16, 2017*; 2:00 pm, ACCN Extra		at No. 16 Virginia	L 60–80	4–4	John Paul Jones Arena (13,910); Charlottesville, VA
Dec 22, 2017*; 11:00 pm, ESPNU		vs. New Mexico State; Diamond Head Classic quarterfinals	L 68–69	4–5	Stan Sheriff Center (7,669); Honolulu, HI
Dec 24, 2017*; 12:30 am, ESPNU		at Hawaii; Diamond Head Classic consolation round	L 71–79	4–6	Stan Sheriff Center (5,946); Honolulu, HI
Dec 25, 2017*; 12:30pm, ESPNU		vs. Akron; Diamond Head Classic 7th place game	W 91–78	5–6	Stan Sheriff Center (6,698); Honolulu, HI
A-10 regular season
Dec 30, 2017; 4:30 pm, NBCSN		at Richmond	L 58–69	5–7 (0–1)	Robins Center (6,560); Richmond, VA
Jan 3, 2018; 7:00 pm		Saint Louis	W 54–51	6–7 (1–1)	John M. Belk Arena (3,140); Davidson, NC
Jan 7, 2018; 12:00 pm, NBCSN		at George Mason	W 86–59	7–7 (2–1)	EagleBank Arena (3,023); Fairfax, VA
Jan 10, 2018; 7:00 pm		George Washington	W 72–45	8–7 (3–1)	John M. Belk Arena (3,310); Davidson, NC
Jan 14, 2018; 3:00 pm, NBCSN		at Fordham	W 75–45	9–7 (4–1)	Rose Hill Gymnasium (1,734); Bronx, NY
Jan 19, 2018; 7:00 pm, ESPN2		St. Bonaventure	W 83–73	10–7 (5–1)	John M. Belk Arena (4,305); Davidson, NC
Jan 23, 2018; 7:00 pm, CBSSN		at Dayton	L 64–65	10–8 (5–2)	UD Arena (13,173); Dayton, OH
Jan 28, 2018; 2:00 pm, NBCSN		Richmond	L 63–66	10–9 (5–3)	John M. Belk Arena (4,412); Davidson, NC
Jan 31, 2018; 7:00 pm, Stadium		La Salle	W 84–65	11–9 (6–3)	John M. Belk Arena (3,248); Davidson, NC
Feb 3, 2018; 4:00 pm		at George Washington	W 87–58	12–9 (7–3)	Charles E. Smith Center (4,018); Washington, D.C.
Feb 6, 2018; 7:00 pm, Stadium		Saint Joseph's	W 91–62	13–9 (8–3)	John M. Belk Arena (3,134); Davidson, NC
Feb 9, 2018; 7:00 pm, ESPN2		at No. 18 Rhode Island	L 59–72	13–10 (8–4)	Ryan Center (7,743); Kingston, RI
Feb 14, 2018; 7:00 pm, CBSSN		at VCU	W 74–63	14–10 (9–4)	Siegel Center (7,637); Richmond, VA
Feb 17, 2018; 7:00 pm		Massachusetts	W 83–78	15–10 (10–4)	John M. Belk Arena (4,202); Davidson, NC
Feb 21, 2018; 7:00 pm		Fordham	W 76–52	16–10 (11–4)	John M. Belk Arena (3,212); Davidson, NC
Feb 24, 2018; 12:00 pm		at Duquesne	W 71–60	17–10 (12–4)	Palumbo Center (2,555); Pittsburgh, PA
Feb 27, 2018; 9:00 pm, CBSSN		at St. Bonaventure	L 113–117 ^{3OT}	17–11 (12–5)	Reilly Center (4,865); Olean, NY
Mar 2, 2018; 8:00 pm, CBSSN		No. 17 Rhode Island	W 63–61	18–11 (13–5)	John M. Belk Arena (4,442); Davidson, NC
A-10 tournament
Mar 9, 2018; 8:30 pm, NBCSN	(3)	vs. (6) Saint Louis; Quarterfinals	W 78–60	19–11	Capital One Arena (7,664); Washington, D.C.
Mar 10, 2018; 3:30 pm, CBSSN	(3)	vs. (2) Saint Bonaventure; Semifinals	W 83–70	20–11	Capital One Arena (8,756); Washington, D.C.
Mar 11, 2018; 1:00 pm, CBS	(3)	vs. (1) No. 25 Rhode Island; Championship	W 58–57	21–11	Capital One Arena (7,643); Washington, D.C.
NCAA tournament
Mar 15, 2018*; 7:10 pm, CBS	(12 S)	vs. (5 S) No. 18 Kentucky; First Round	L 73–78	21–12	Taco Bell Arena (11,673); Boise, ID
*Non-conference game. ^{#}Rankings from AP Poll. (#) Tournament seedings in parentheses. S=South. All times are in Eastern Time.
