= Michael Hughes (basketball) =

American basketball player (born 1998)

Free agent
- Position: Center / Power forward

Personal information
- Born: February 1, 1998 (age 28) Huntington, West Virginia, U.S.
- Listed height: 6 ft 8 in (2.03 m)
- Listed weight: 240 lb (109 kg)

Career information
- High school: Liberty (Liberty, Missouri); Liberty North (Liberty, Missouri)
- College: Akron (2016–2017); Duquesne (2018–2021)
- NBA draft: 2021: undrafted
- Playing career: 2021–present

Career history
- 2021–2022: BC Vienna
- 2022–2023: Kaposvári KK
- 2023–2024: CBet Jonava
- 2024: MHP Riesen Ludwigsburg
- 2024–2025: Shonan United

Career highlights
- Hungarian League efficiency leader (2023); Hungarian League rebounding leader (2023); Austrian League champion (2022); Austrian Cup winner (2022)

Michael Anthony Hughes II (born February 1, 1998) is an American professional basketball player. He played college basketball for the Akron Zips and the Duquesne Dukes.

== Early life and high school career ==
Hughes joined his first basketball league at the age of five. He attended Liberty High School in Liberty, Missouri during his freshman year. Due to redistricting, Hughes transferred to Liberty North High School for his sophomore season. As a sophomore, he averaged 12.1 points and 8.7 rebounds per game. Hughes averaged 14.4 points, 12 rebounds, and 4.7 blocks per game as a junior, while shooting 59.7 percent. He earned Suburban Middle Seven All-Conference first-team honors as well as all-district accolades after helping guide Liberty North to a fifth-consecutive district championship. As a senior, Hughes averaged 22 points and 15 rebounds per game. He set school records for rebounds (979) and blocks (349) during his career. He committed to playing college basketball for Akron.

== College career ==
Hughes averaged 1.8 points and 1.2 rebounds per game as a freshman at Akron. Following the season, he transferred to Duquesne, following coach Keith Dambrot who was hired there. Hughes underwent surgery in the summer for stress fractures in his shins. During his redshirt season, he focused on dieting and conditioning, eventually losing 45 pounds. As a sophomore, Hughes averaged 11.2 points, 6.5 rebounds, and 2.3 blocks per game, which was second in the Atlantic 10 Conference. On December 4, 2019, he scored a career-high 23 points to go with 11 rebounds in a 71–58 win against VMI. During his junior season, Hughes was a strong defensive presence but struggled with foul trouble. He averaged 10.3 points, 6.8 rebounds, 1.5 steals and 2.7 blocks per game. As a senior, Hughes averaged 10.8 points and 7.9 rebounds per game. He finished as the program’s all-time leader in career field goal percentage, making 56.2 percent of his shot attempts, as well as fourth on Duquesne’s all-time blocks list with 177.

== Professional career ==
On August 15, 2021, Hughes signed his first professional contract with BC Vienna of the Austrian Basketball Superliga.

On July 14, 2023, Hughes signed a one-year deal with CBet Jonava of the Lithuanian Basketball League (LKL).

On August 5, 2024, Hughes signed with the Shonan United of the B.League.

On August 5, 2025, he came back to BC Jonava, signing a one-year contract. The club released a statement on August 29, stating that the contract did not come into effect as Hughes had failed his medical examination.

In 2026, he signed with the Montreal Alliance in the CEBL, in Canada, for the 2026 season.

== Career statistics ==
Legend
GP	Games played	GS	Games started	MPG	Minutes per game
FG%	Field goal percentage	3P%	3-point field goal percentage	FT%	Free throw percentage
RPG	Rebounds per game	APG	Assists per game	SPG	Steals per game
BPG	Blocks per game	PPG	Points per game	**Bold**	Career high

=== College ===
Year	Team	GP	GS	MPG	FG%	3P%	FT%	RPG	APG	SPG	BPG	PPG
2016–17	Akron	20	1	7.3	.458	–	**.650**	1.2	.4	.3	.5	1.8
2017–18	Duquesne	Redshirt										
2018–19	Duquesne	29	**28**	24.2	**.589**	**.286**	.594	6.5	.9	.9	2.3	**11.2**
2019–20	Duquesne	**30**	**28**	24.5	.573	.278	.649	6.8	1.6	**1.5**	**2.7**	10.3
2020–21	Duquesne	18	16	**26.9**	.510	.176	.633	**7.9**	**2.1**	1.0	1.6	10.8
Career		97	73	21.3	.557	.238	.622	5.8	1.2	1.0	1.9	8.9

== Personal life ==
Hughes is the fourth of six children born to Robbie-Joe and Michael Hughes I. His father died in 2003, while competing in a men's basketball league at Longview Community College. According to an autopsy, he had an enlarged heart. Following his father's death, Hughes became close with his older brother Tony. In February 2006, his mother discovered Tony dead in his room from a self-inflicted gunshot wound at the age of 19. The loss of his older brother turned Michael into a selfish and angry player on the court, until his coaches found a way to curb his negative behavior. Hughes developed a love for reading.
