= 2017–18 St. Bonaventure Bonnies men's basketball team =

American college basketball season

2017–18 St. Bonaventure Bonnies men's basketball
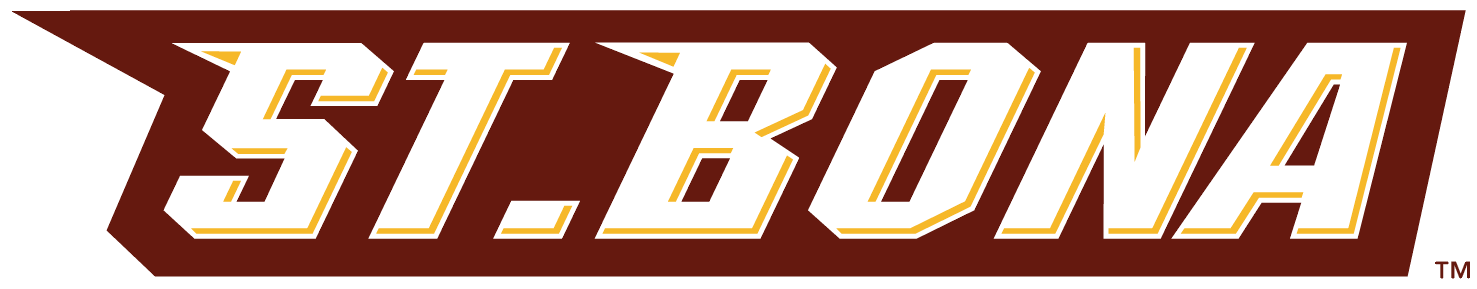

NCAA tournament, First Round
- Conference: Atlantic 10 Conference
- Record: 26–8 (14–4 A-10)
- Head coach: Mark Schmidt (11th season)
- Assistant coaches: Dave Moore; Steve Curran; Dwayne Lee
- Home arena: Reilly Center

2017–18 Atlantic 10 men's basketball standings
| | Conf. | | | | Overall |
| Team | W | | L | PCT | W | | L | PCT |
|---|---|---|---|---|---|---|---|---|
| Rhode Island | 15 | – | 3 | .833 | 26 | – | 8 | .765 |
| St. Bonaventure | 14 | – | 4 | .778 | 26 | – | 8 | .765 |
| Davidson † | 13 | – | 5 | .722 | 21 | – | 12 | .636 |
| Saint Joseph's | 10 | – | 8 | .556 | 16 | – | 16 | .500 |
| VCU | 9 | – | 9 | .500 | 18 | – | 15 | .545 |
| Saint Louis | 9 | – | 9 | .500 | 17 | – | 16 | .515 |
| George Mason | 9 | – | 9 | .500 | 16 | – | 17 | .485 |
| Richmond | 9 | – | 9 | .500 | 12 | – | 20 | .375 |
| Dayton | 8 | – | 10 | .444 | 14 | – | 17 | .452 |
| Duquesne | 7 | – | 11 | .389 | 16 | – | 16 | .500 |
| George Washington | 7 | – | 11 | .389 | 15 | – | 18 | .455 |
| La Salle | 7 | – | 11 | .389 | 13 | – | 19 | .406 |
| Massachusetts | 5 | – | 13 | .278 | 13 | – | 20 | .394 |
| Fordham | 4 | – | 14 | .222 | 9 | – | 22 | .290 |
† 2018 A10 Tournament winner Rankings from AP poll

The 2017–18 St. Bonaventure Bonnies men's basketball team represented St. Bonaventure University during the 2017–18 NCAA Division I men's basketball season. The Bonnies, led by 11th-year head coach Mark Schmidt, played their home games at the Reilly Center in Olean, New York as members of the Atlantic 10 Conference. They finished the season 26–8, 14–4 in A-10 play to finish in second place. They defeated Richmond in the quarterfinals of the A-10 tournament before losing in the semifinals to Davidson. They received one of the last four at-large bids to the NCAA tournament where they defeated UCLA in the First Four before losing in the first round to Florida.

== Previous season ==
The Bonnies finished the 2016–17 season 20–12, 11–7 in A-10 play to finish in fifth place. They received the fifth seed in the A-10 tournament where they defeated UMass in the second round to advance to the quarterfinals, where they lost to Rhode Island. The Bonnies did not participate in a postseason tournament.

== Offseason ==
=== Departures ===
| Name | Number | Pos. | Height | Weight | Year | Hometown | Reason for departure |
|---|---|---|---|---|---|---|---|
| David Andoh | 0 | F | 6'7" | 230 | Senior | Montreal, Quebec | Graduated |
| Tareq Coburn | 3 | F | 6'5" | 200 | Freshman | Rosedale, NY | Transferred to Hofstra |
| Chinonso Obokoh | 5 | C | 6'9" | 215 | RS Senior | Rochester, NY | Left program |
| Denzel Gregg | 12 | F | 6'7" | 225 | Senior | Syracuse, NY | Graduated |
| Caleb McGuire | 24 | G | 6'4" | 190 | Senior | Belmont, NY | Graduated |

=== Incoming transfers ===
| Name | Number | Pos. | Height | Weight | Year | Hometown | Previous School |
|---|---|---|---|---|---|---|---|
| Jaylen Poser | | G | 6'4" | 180 | Junior | Malton, Ontario | Transferred from UNLV. Will be eligible to play for the 2018–19 season. and have two seasons of eligibility. |

=== 2017 recruiting class ===
College recruiting information
| Name | Hometown | School | Height | Weight | Commit date |
|---|---|---|---|---|---|
| Tshiefu Ngalakulondi #75 SF | Manchester, NH | Proctor Academy | 6 ft 6 in (1.98 m) | 210 lb (95 kg) | Sep 21, 2016 |
| Tshiefu Ngalakulondi #75 SF | Recruit ratings: Scout: Rivals: (67) | | | | |
Overall recruit ranking:
Note: In many cases, Scout, Rivals, 247Sports, On3, and ESPN may conflict in their listings of height and weight.; In these cases, the average was taken. ESPN grades are on a 100-point scale.; Sources: "2017 Team Ranking". Rivals.

== Preseason ==
In a poll of the league’s head coaches and select media members at the conference's media day, the Bonnies were picked to finish second in the A-10. Seniors Jaylen Adams and Matt Mobley were named to the conference's preseason first team.

== Roster ==
2017–18 St. Bonaventure Bonnies men's basketball team
Players
Coaches

| Pos. | # | Name | Height | Weight | Year | Previous school | Hometown |
|---|---|---|---|---|---|---|---|
| G | 1 | Idris Taqqee | 6 ft 4 in (1.93 m) | 195 lb (88 kg) | Sr | Cushing Academy | Snellville, Georgia |
| G | 2 | Matt Mobley | 6 ft 3 in (1.91 m) | 185 lb (84 kg) | RS Sr | Central Connecticut State | Worcester, Massachusetts |
| G | 3 | Jaylen Adams | 6 ft 2 in (1.88 m) | 190 lb (86 kg) | Sr | Mount Saint Joseph High School | Baltimore, Maryland |
| G | 4 | Nelson Kaputo | 6 ft 0 in (1.83 m) | 175 lb (79 kg) | Jr | St. Michael's College School | Toronto, Ontario |
| F | 5 | Tshiefu Ngalakulondi | 6 ft 6 in (1.98 m) | 210 lb (95 kg) | Fr | Proctor Academy | Manchester, New Hampshire |
| G/F | 11 | Courtney Stockard | 6 ft 5 in (1.96 m) | 205 lb (93 kg) | RS Jr | Allen Community College | St. Louis, Missouri |
| C | 12 | Ndene Gueye | 6 ft 10 in (2.08 m) | 225 lb (102 kg) | Jr | Kilgore College | Senegal |
| F | 15 | LaDarien Griffin | 6 ft 6 in (1.98 m) | 215 lb (98 kg) | Jr | Providence School | Jacksonville, Florida |
| G | 21 | Izaiah Brockington | 6 ft 4 in (1.93 m) | 180 lb (82 kg) | Fr | Archbishop Ryan High School | Philadelphia, Pennsylvania |
| G | 24 | Jack Galatio | 5 ft 10 in (1.78 m) | 165 lb (75 kg) | So | Hornell High School | Hornell, New York |
| F/C | 32 | Amadi Ikpeze | 6 ft 10 in (2.08 m) | 245 lb (111 kg) | So | Amherst Central High School | Buffalo, New York |
| F | 33 | Josh Ayeni | 6 ft 8 in (2.03 m) | 215 lb (98 kg) | So | Impact Academy (FL) | Zaria, Nigeria |
| G | | Jalen Poyser (redshirt) | 6 ft 4 in (1.93 m) | 180 lb (82 kg) | Jr | UNLV | Malton, Ontario |

Head coach

- Mark Schmidt (Boston College)

Assistant coach(es)

- Dave Moore (Bethel (TN))
- Steve Curran (Merrimack)
- Dwayne Lee (Saint Joseph's)

Legend

- (C) Team captain
- (S) Suspended
- (I) Ineligible
- (W) Walk-on
- Injured
- Current redshirt

Roster

== Schedule and results ==
| Date time, TV | Rank^{#} | Opponent^{#} | Result | Record | High points | High rebounds | High assists | Site (attendance) city, state |
Exhibition
| Nov 4, 2017*; 7:00 pm | | Alfred | W 109–73 | | 20 – Stockard | 7 – Ngalakulondi | 5 – Mobley | Reilly Center (2,534); Olean, NY |
Non-conference regular season
| Nov 10, 2017*; 8:00 pm | | Niagara | L 75–77 | 0–1 | 29 – Mobley | 10 – Tied | 3 – Mobley | Reilly Center (4,952); Olean, NY |
| Nov 18, 2017*; 4:00 pm | | Jackson State; Emerald Coast Classic campus game | W 72–58 | 1–1 | 27 – Mobley | 9 – Griffin | 6 – Tied | Reilly Centre (3,619); Olean, NY |
| Nov 20, 2017*; 7:00 pm | | Maryland Eastern Shore; Emerald Coast Classic campus game | W 96–48 | 2–1 | 21 – Ngalakulondi | 10 – Taqqee | 7 – Mobley | Reilly Center (3,281); Olean, NY |
| Nov 24, 2017*; 9:30 pm, CBSSN | | vs. Maryland; Emerald Coast Classic semifinals | W 63–61 | 3–1 | 16 – Mobley | 5 – Tied | 3 – Kaputo | The Arena at NWFSC (1,650); Niceville, FL |
| Nov 25, 2017*; 7:00 pm, CBSSN | | vs. TCU; Emerald Coast Classic championship | L 79–89 | 3–2 | 20 – Brockington | 8 – Stockard | 5 – Mobley | The Arena at NWFSC (1,400); Niceville, FL |
| Nov 29, 2017*; 7:00 pm | | at Siena; Franciscan Cup | W 75–55 | 4–2 | 22 – Mobley | 11 – Griffin | 4 – Griffin | Times Union Center (5,535); Albany, NY |
| Dec 2, 2017*; 2:00 pm | | at Buffalo | W 73–62 | 5–2 | 25 – Mobley | 9 – Stockard | 3 – Taqqee | Alumni Arena (6,212); Buffalo, NY |
| Dec 6, 2017*; 7:00 pm | | at Canisius | W 73–65 | 6–2 | 20 – Adams | 10 – Griffin | 9 – Adams | Koessler Center (2,196); Buffalo, NY |
| Dec 9, 2017*; 12:00 pm, ESPNU | | Yale | W 75–67 | 7–2 | 25 – Adams | 7 – Griffin | 9 – Adams | Reilly Center (3,913); Olean, NY |
| Dec 16, 2017*; 4:00 pm | | vs. Vermont; Roc City Hoops Classic | W 81–79 | 8–2 | 17 – Adams | 5 – Mobley | 6 – Adams | Blue Cross Arena (5,828); Rochester, NY |
| Dec 20, 2017*; 7:00 pm | | Northeastern | W 84–65 | 9–2 | 23 – Mobley | 7 – Tied | 3 – Adams | Reilly Center (3,278); Olean, NY |
| Dec 22, 2017*; 7:00 pm, ACCN Extra | | at Syracuse | W 60–57 ^{OT} | 10–2 | 23 – Adams | 9 – Adams | 5 – Stockard | Carrier Dome (20,976); Syracuse, NY |
Atlantic 10 regular season
| Dec 30, 2017; 2:30 pm, NBCSN | | Massachusetts | W 98–78 | 11–2 (1–0) | 32 – Adams | 12 – Taqqee | 7 – Adams | Reilly Centre (4,945); Olean, NY |
| Jan 3, 2018; 8:30 pm, CBSSN | | at Dayton | L 72–82 | 11–3 (1–1) | 24 – Mobley | 8 – Mobley | 7 – Adams | UD Arena (12,188); Dayton, OH |
| Jan 6, 2018; 8:00 pm, ESPNU | | at Saint Joseph's | L 78–85 | 11–4 (1–2) | 19 – Adams | 8 – Griffin | 7 – Adams | Hagan Arena (4,061); Philadelphia, PA |
| Jan 10, 2018; 7:00 pm | | Fordham | W 77–61 | 12–4 (2–2) | 21 – Griffin | 14 – Griffin | 6 – Kaputo | Reilly Center (3,133); Olean, NY |
| Jan 13, 2018; 11:00 am, ESPNU | | at Rhode Island | L 73–87 | 12–5 (2–3) | 19 – Tied | 9 – Stockard | 2 – Stockard | Ryan Center (7,082); Kingston, RI |
| Jan 19, 2018; 7:00 pm, ESPN2 | | at Davidson | L 73–83 | 12–6 (2–4) | 25 – Mobley | 8 – Taqqee | 4 – Mobley | John M. Belk Arena (4,305); Davidson, NC |
| Jan 24, 2018; 7:00 pm, CBSSN | | Saint Joseph's | W 70–67 | 13–6 (3–4) | 16 – Adams | 13 – Stockard | 5 – Mobley | Reilly Center (3,548); Olean, NY |
| Jan 28, 2018; 12:00 pm, NBCSN | | George Washington | W 70–52 | 14–6 (4–4) | 24 – Mobley | 7 – Stockard | 8 – Adams | Reilly Centre (4,976); Olean, NY |
| Jan 31, 2018; 7:00 pm, Stadium | | at George Mason | W 85–69 | 15–6 (5–4) | 35 – Mobley | 11 – Mobley | 8 – Adams | EagleBank Arena (3,024); Fairfax, VA |
| Feb 3, 2018; 6:30 pm, NBCSN | | at Duquesne | W 84–81 | 16–6 (6–4) | 40 – Adams | 9 – Taqqee | 7 – Adams | Palumbo Center (3,411); Pittsburgh, PA |
| Feb 7, 2018; 7:00 pm | | Saint Louis | W 79–56 | 17–6 (7–4) | 44 – Adams | 6 – Stockard | 6 – Adams | Reilly Centre (3,448); Olean, NY |
| Feb 10, 2018; 4:00 pm | | Richmond | W 97–88 | 18–6 (8–4) | 24 – Tied | 11 – Stockard | 7 – Adams | Reilly Centre (5,480); Olean, NY |
| Feb 13, 2018; 7:00 pm | | at La Salle | W 79–68 | 19–6 (9–4) | 30 – Mobley | 9 – Mobley | 5 – Adams | Tom Gola Arena; Philadelphia, PA |
| Feb 16, 2018; 7:00 pm, ESPN2 | | No. 16 Rhode Island | W 77–74 | 20–6 (10–4) | 26 – Mobley | 9 – Mobley | 8 – Adams | Reilly Center (5,480); Olean, NY |
| Feb 21, 2018; 7:00 pm | | Duquesne | W 73–67 | 21–6 (11–4) | 24 – Adams | 10 – Ikpeze | 5 – Adams | Reilly Center (5,089); Olean, NY |
| Feb 24, 2018; 8:00 pm, CBSSN | | at VCU | W 68–63 | 22–6 (12–4) | 21 – Tied | 14 – Stockard | 6 – Adams | Siegel Center; Richmond, VA |
| Feb 27, 2018; 9:00 pm, CBSSN | | Davidson | W 117–113 ^{3OT} | 23–6 (13–4) | 34 – Adams | 8 – Tied | 5 – Adams | Reilly Center (4,865); Olean, NY |
| Mar 3, 2018; 8:00 pm | | at Saint Louis | W 64–56 | 24–6 (14–4) | 22 – Stockard | 10 – Stockard | 2 – Tied | Chaifetz Arena (8,542); St. Louis, MO |
Atlantic 10 tournament
| Mar 9, 2018; 6:00 pm, NBCSN | (2) | vs. (7) Richmond; Quarterfinals | W 83–77 | 25–6 | 29 – Mobley | 11 – Griffin | 6 – Adams | Capital One Arena (7,664); Washington, D.C. |
| Mar 10, 2018; 3:30 pm, CBSSN | (2) | vs. (3) Davidson; Semifinals | L 70–82 | 25–7 | 20 – Adams | 9 – Taqqee | 8 – Adams | Capital One Arena (8,756); Washington, D.C. |
NCAA tournament
| Mar 13, 2018; 9:10 pm, truTV | (11 E) | vs. (11 E) UCLA; First Four | W 65–58 | 26–7 | 26 – Stockard | 10 – Taqqee | 3 – Tied | UD Arena (12,336); Dayton, OH |
| Mar 15, 2018; 9:57 pm, truTV | (11 E) | vs. (6 E) No. 23 Florida; First Round | L 62–77 | 26–8 | 14 – Stockard | 13 – Taqqee | 2 – Tied | American Airlines Center (18,703); Dallas, TX |
*Non-conference game. ^{#}Rankings from AP Poll/Coaches' Poll. (#) Tournament seedings in parentheses. E=East. All times are in Eastern Time.
