= 2018 Atlantic 10 men's basketball tournament =

- Classification: Division I
- Season: 2017–18
- Teams: 14
- Site: Capital One Arena; Washington, D.C.
- Champions: Davidson (1st title)
- Winning coach: Bob McKillop (1st title)
- MVP: Peyton Aldridge (Davidson)
- Attendance: 49,714
- Television: Stadium, NBCSN, CBSSN, CBS

2017–18 Atlantic 10 men's basketball standings
	Conf.				Overall
Team	W		L	PCT	W		L	PCT
Rhode Island	15	–	3	.833	26	–	8	.765
St. Bonaventure	14	–	4	.778	26	–	8	.765
Davidson †	13	–	5	.722	21	–	12	.636
Saint Joseph's	10	–	8	.556	16	–	16	.500
VCU	9	–	9	.500	18	–	15	.545
Saint Louis	9	–	9	.500	17	–	16	.515
George Mason	9	–	9	.500	16	–	17	.485
Richmond	9	–	9	.500	12	–	20	.375
Dayton	8	–	10	.444	14	–	17	.452
Duquesne	7	–	11	.389	16	–	16	.500
George Washington	7	–	11	.389	15	–	18	.455
La Salle	7	–	11	.389	13	–	19	.406
Massachusetts	5	–	13	.278	13	–	20	.394
Fordham	4	–	14	.222	9	–	22	.290
† 2018 A10 Tournament winner Rankings from AP poll

The 2018 Atlantic 10 men's basketball tournament was the postseason men's basketball tournament for the Atlantic 10 Conference's 2017–18 season. It was held March 7 through March 11, 2018 at Capital One Arena in Washington, D.C. Davidson won the tournament by defeating Rhode Island in the championship game. As a result, Davidson received the conference's automatic bid to the NCAA tournament.

== Seeds ==
All 14 A-10 schools participated in the tournament. Teams were seeded by record within the conference, with a tiebreaker system to seed teams with identical conference records. The top 10 teams received a first round bye and the top four teams received a double bye.

Seed	School	Record	Tiebreaker
1	Rhode Island	15–3	
2	St. Bonaventure	14–4	
3	Davidson	13–5	
4	Saint Joseph's	10–8	
5	George Mason	9–9	3–2 vs. Richmond, SLU, VCU
6	Saint Louis	9–9	2–2 vs. GM, Richmond, VCU (2–0 vs. Richmond)
7	Richmond	9–9	3–3 vs. GM, SLU, VCU
8	VCU	9–9	2–3 vs. GM, Richmond, SLU
9	Dayton	8–10	
10	Duquesne	7–11	3–0 vs. GW, La Salle
11	George Washington	7–11	1–2 vs. Duquesne, La Salle
12	La Salle	7–11	0–2 vs. Duquesne, GW
13	Massachusetts	5–13	
14	Fordham	4–14	

== Schedule ==
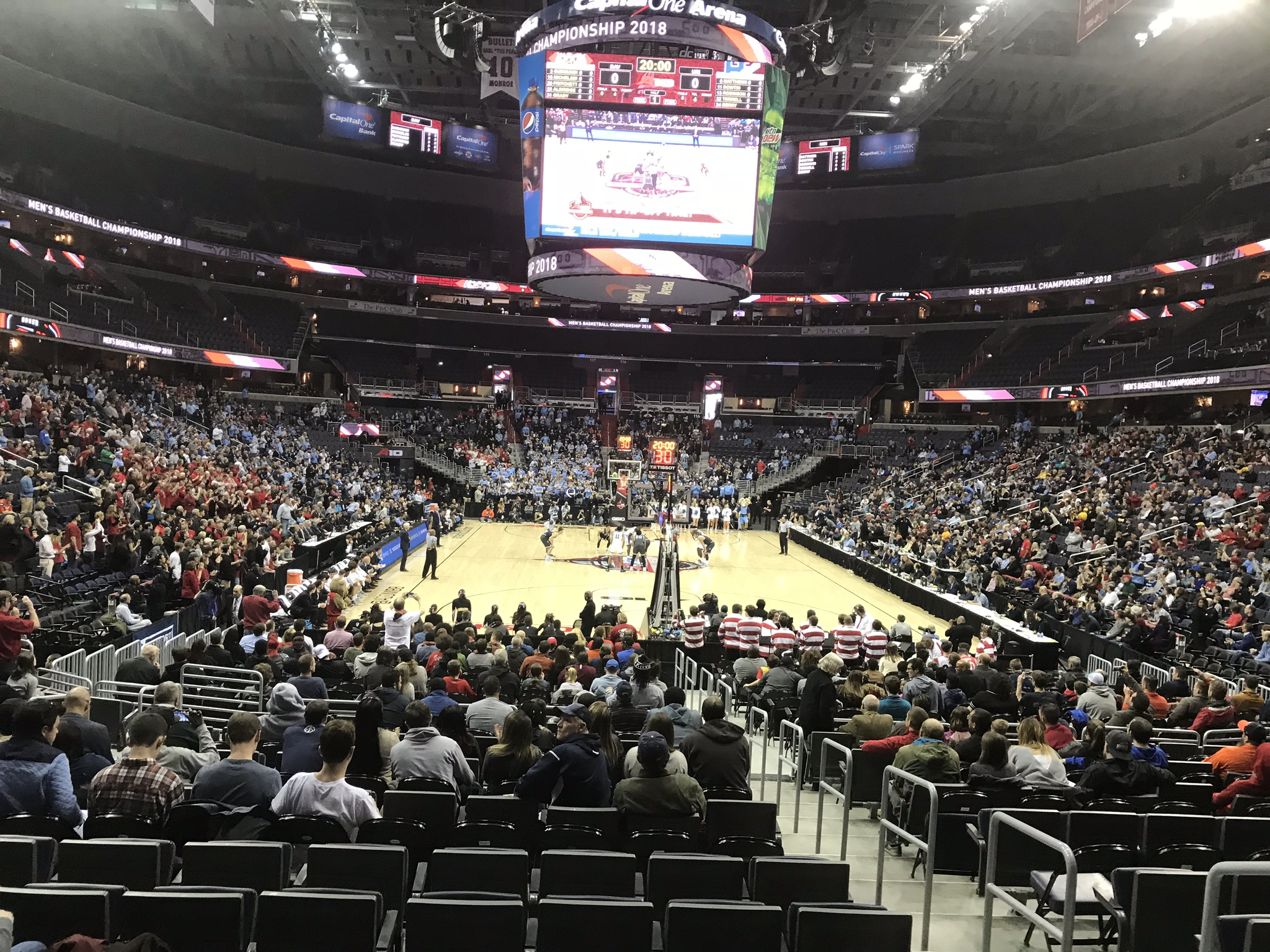
Capital One Arena just prior to tip-off for the championship game between Davidson and Rhode Island

Session	Game	Time	Matchup	Score	Television	Attendance
First round – Wednesday, March 7
1	1	6:00 pm	No. 12 La Salle vs No. 13 Massachusetts	67–69	Stadium	5,333
1	2	8:30 pm	No. 11 George Washington vs No. 14 Fordham	78–72	Stadium	5,333
Second round – Thursday, March 8
2	3	12:00 pm	No. 8 VCU vs No. 9 Dayton	77–72	NBCSN	6,483
2	4	2:30 pm	No. 5 George Mason vs No. 13 Massachusetts	80–75	NBCSN	6,483
3	5	6:00 pm	No. 7 Richmond vs No. 10 Duquesne	81–68	NBCSN	6,514
3	6	8:30 pm	No. 6 Saint Louis vs No. 11 George Washington	70–63	NBCSN	6,514
Quarterfinals – Friday, March 9
4	7	12:00 pm	No. 1 Rhode Island vs No. 8 VCU	76–67	NBCSN	7,321
4	8	2:30 pm	No. 4 Saint Joseph's vs No. 5 George Mason	68–49	NBCSN	7,321
5	9	6:00 pm	No. 2 St. Bonaventure vs No. 7 Richmond	83–77	NBCSN	7,664
5	10	8:30 pm	No. 3 Davidson vs No. 6 Saint Louis	78–60	NBCSN	7,664
Semifinals – Saturday, March 10
6	11	1:00 pm	No. 1 Rhode Island No. 4 Saint Joseph's	90–87	CBSSN	8,756
6	12	3:30 pm	No. 2 St. Bonaventure vs No. 3 Davidson	70–83	CBSSN	8,756
Championship – Sunday, March 11
7	13	1:00 pm	No. 1 Rhode Island vs No. 3 Davidson	57–58	CBS	7,643
Game times in Eastern Time. (Note: The United States began Daylight saving time at 2:00 am on Sunday, March 11, 2018. As a result, times through the semifinal games are in Eastern Standard Time while the Championship game time is in Eastern Daylight Time.) Rankings denote tournament seed

== Bracket ==
First round Wednesday, March 7 Stadium
12	La Salle	67
13	Massachusetts	69
11	George Washington	78
14	Fordham	72

Second round Thursday, March 8 NBCSN
8	VCU	77
9	Dayton	72
5	George Mason	80
13	Massachusetts	75
7	Richmond	81
10	Duquesne	68
6	Saint Louis	70
11	George Washington	63

Quarterfinals; Friday, March 9 NBCSN
1	Rhode Island	76
8	VCU	67
4	Saint Joseph's	68
5	George Mason	49
2	St. Bonaventure	83
7	Richmond	77
3	Davidson	78
6	Saint Louis	60

Semifinals; Saturday, March 10; CBSSN
1	Rhode Island	90
4	Saint Joseph's	87
2	St. Bonaventure	70
3	Davidson	82

Championship; Sunday, March 11; CBS
1	Rhode Island	57
3	Davidson	58
