= 2017–18 Richmond Spiders men's basketball team =

American college basketball season

2017–18 Richmond Spiders men's basketball
- Conference: Atlantic 10 Conference
- Record: 12–20 (9–9 A-10)
- Head coach: Chris Mooney (13th season)
- Assistant coaches: Rob Jones (10th season); Kim Lewis (5th season); Marcus Jenkins (3rd season)
- Home arena: Robins Center

2017–18 Atlantic 10 men's basketball standings
	Conf.				Overall
Team	W		L	PCT	W		L	PCT
Rhode Island	15	–	3	.833	26	–	8	.765
St. Bonaventure	14	–	4	.778	26	–	8	.765
Davidson †	13	–	5	.722	21	–	12	.636
Saint Joseph's	10	–	8	.556	16	–	16	.500
VCU	9	–	9	.500	18	–	15	.545
Saint Louis	9	–	9	.500	17	–	16	.515
George Mason	9	–	9	.500	16	–	17	.485
Richmond	9	–	9	.500	12	–	20	.375
Dayton	8	–	10	.444	14	–	17	.452
Duquesne	7	–	11	.389	16	–	16	.500
George Washington	7	–	11	.389	15	–	18	.455
La Salle	7	–	11	.389	13	–	19	.406
Massachusetts	5	–	13	.278	13	–	20	.394
Fordham	4	–	14	.222	9	–	22	.290
† 2018 A10 Tournament winner Rankings from AP poll

The 2017–18 Richmond Spiders men's basketball team represented the University of Richmond during the 2017–18 NCAA Division I men's basketball season. They were led by 13th-year head coach Chris Mooney and played their home games at the Robins Center Richmond as members of the Atlantic 10 Conference. They finished the season 12–20, 9–9 in A-10 play to finish in a four-way tie for fifth place. As the No. 7 seed in the A-10 tournament, they defeated Duquesne in the second round before losing to St. Bonaventure in the quarterfinals.

== Previous season ==
The Spiders finished the 2016–17 season 19–11, 13–5 in A-10 play to finish in a tie for third place in the conference. They defeated George Washington in the quarterfinals of the A-10 tournament before losing to VCU in the semifinals. They received an invitation to the National Invitation Tournament, where they defeated Alabama and Oakland before falling to TCU in the quarterfinals.

== Offseason ==
=== Departures ===
Name	Number	Pos.	Height	Weight	Year	Hometown	Notes
ShawnDre' Jones	3	G	6'0"	165	Senior	Houston, Texas	Graduated
T. J. Cline	10	F/C	6'9"	230	RS Senior	Plano, Texas	Graduated
Chase Fletcher	12	F	6'7"	220	Senior	Dallas, Texas	Walk-on; graduated
Marshall Wood	24	F	6'8"	215	RS Senior	Rustburg, Virginia	Graduated
Jesse Pistokache	30	G	6'3"	205	Sophomore	Mission, Texas	Transferred to Salem International
Kwesi Abakah	34	F	6'8"	240	Grad Student	Suwanee, Georgia	Graduated

=== 2017 recruiting class ===
College recruiting information
Name	Hometown	School	Height	Weight	Commit date
Tomas Verbinskis #67 SF	Weston, Florida	The Sagemont School	6 ft 7 in (2.01 m)	210 lb (95 kg)	Oct 21, 2016
Tomas Verbinskis #67 SF	Recruit ratings: Scout: Rivals: (72)				
Bryce Schneider; SG	Myrtle Beach, South Carolina	Myrtle Beach High School	6 ft 5 in (1.96 m)	175 lb (79 kg)	Oct 16, 2015
Bryce Schneider; SG	Recruit ratings: Scout: Rivals: (NR)				
Jacob Gilyard; PG	Kansas City, Missouri	The Barstow School	5 ft 9 in (1.75 m)	160 lb (73 kg)	Sep 12, 2016
Jacob Gilyard; PG	Recruit ratings: Scout: Rivals: (NR)				
Nathan Cayo; SG	Montreal, Quebec	College Jean-De-Brebeuf	6 ft 6 in (1.98 m)	205 lb (93 kg)	Oct 13, 2016
Nathan Cayo; SG	Recruit ratings: Scout: Rivals: (NR)				
Phoenix Ford; SF	Saint Petersburg, Florida	Saint Petersburg High School	6 ft 8 in (2.03 m)	210 lb (95 kg)	Nov 7, 2016
Phoenix Ford; SF	Recruit ratings: Scout: Rivals: (NR)				
Overall recruit ranking: Scout: NR Rivals: NR ESPN: NR
Note: In many cases, Scout, Rivals, 247Sports, On3, and ESPN may conflict in their listings of height and weight.; In these cases, the average was taken. ESPN grades are on a 100-point scale.; Sources: "Rivals.com 2017 Richmond Commitments". Rivals.; "Scout.com 2017 Richmond Commitments". Scout.; "ESPN 2017 Richmond Commitments". ESPN.; "Scout.com Team Recruiting Rankings". Scout.; "2017 Team Ranking". Rivals.

== Future recruits ==
=== 2018 recruiting class ===
College recruiting information
Name	Hometown	School	Height	Weight	Commit date
Souleymane Koureissi; SF	New Rochelle, NY	Iona Preparatory School	6 ft 8 in (2.03 m)	180 lb (82 kg)	Oct 31, 2017
Souleymane Koureissi; SF	Recruit ratings: Scout: Rivals: 247Sports: (77)				
Overall recruit ranking:
Note: In many cases, Scout, Rivals, 247Sports, On3, and ESPN may conflict in their listings of height and weight.; In these cases, the average was taken. ESPN grades are on a 100-point scale.; Sources: "Rivals.com 2018 Richmond Commitments". Rivals.; "2018 Team Ranking". Rivals.

== Preseason ==
In a poll of the league’s head coaches and select media members at the conference's media day, the Spiders were picked to finish in eighth place in the A-10. De’Monte Buckingham was named to the conference's preseason second team.

== Roster ==
2017–18 Richmond Spiders men's basketball team
Players
Coaches

Pos.	#	Name	Height	Weight	Year	Previous school	Hometown
G	0	Jacob Gilyard	5 ft 9 in (1.75 m)	160 lb (73 kg)	Fr	The Barstow School	Kansas City, Missouri
G	1	Joe Kirby (W)	6 ft 1 in (1.85 m)	205 lb (93 kg)	Sr	Sagemont School	Fort Lauderdale, Florida
G	2	Khwan Fore	6 ft 0 in (1.83 m)	175 lb (79 kg)	RS Jr	Lee High School	Huntsville, Alabama
G	3	Bryce Schneider (redshirt)	6 ft 5 in (1.96 m)	175 lb (79 kg)	Fr	Christian Academy of Myrtle Beach	Myrtle Beach, South Carolina
G	4	Nathan Cayo	6 ft 7 in (2.01 m)	205 lb (93 kg)	Fr	Collège Jean-de-Brébeuf	Montreal, Canada
G	5	Nick Sherod	6 ft 4 in (1.93 m)	230 lb (104 kg)	So	St. Christopher's School	Richmond, Virginia
G	11	De'Monte Buckingham	6 ft 4 in (1.93 m)	230 lb (104 kg)	So	Henrico High School	Richmond, Virginia
F	12	Phoenix Ford (redshirt)	6 ft 8 in (2.03 m)	210 lb (95 kg)	Fr	St. Petersburg High School	St. Petersburg, Florida
G/F	21	Tomas Verbinskis	6 ft 7 in (2.01 m)	210 lb (95 kg)	Fr	Sagemont School	Klaipeda, Lithuania
F	22	Sullivan Kulju (W)	6 ft 6 in (1.98 m)	200 lb (91 kg)	Fr	Eisenhower Middle/High School	New Berlin, Wisconsin
F	25	Jordan Madrid-Andrews	6 ft 8 in (2.03 m)	240 lb (109 kg)	GS	Chicago State	Denver, Colorado
G	30	Keith Oddo (W)	6 ft 1 in (1.85 m)	185 lb (84 kg)	Jr	North Cross School	Roanoke, Virginia
G	31	Jordan Gaitley (W)	6 ft 4 in (1.93 m)	190 lb (86 kg)	Fr	Fordham Preparatory School	Haverford, Pennsylvania
G	32	Julius Johnson	6 ft 3 in (1.91 m)	185 lb (84 kg)	Jr	Florida Air Academy	Cocoa, Florida
F/C	33	Grant Golden	6 ft 10 in (2.08 m)	260 lb (118 kg)	RS Fr	St. James School	Winchester, Virginia
F	44	Paul Friendshuh	6 ft 10 in (2.08 m)	240 lb (109 kg)	RS Jr	New Prague High School	New Prague, Minnesota

Head coach

- Chris Mooney (Princeton)

Assistant coach(es)

- Rob Jones (Toccoa Falls)
- Kim Lewis (Tulane)
- Marcus Jenkins (Air Force)

Legend

- (C) Team captain
- (S) Suspended
- (I) Ineligible
- (W) Walk-on
- Injured
- Current redshirt

Roster
Last update: February 20, 2018

== Schedule and results ==
Date time, TV	Rank^{#}	Opponent^{#}	Result	Record	High points	High rebounds	High assists	Site (attendance) city, state
Non-conference regular season
Nov 10, 2017*; 7:00 pm, NBCSWA+		Delaware	L 63–76	0–1	18 – Buckingham	6 – Tied	4 – Gilyard	Robins Center (7,201); Richmond, Virginia
Nov 13, 2017* noon, NBCSWA		Jacksonville State	L 61–94	0–2	13 – 3 Tied	6 – Golden	4 – Golden	Robins Center (6,805); Richmond, Virginia
Nov 20, 2017*; 5:00 pm		vs. UAB; Cayman Islands Classic Quarterfinals	W 63–50	1–2	26 – Golden	7 – Golden	5 – Stansbury	John Gray High School (650); George Town, Cayman Islands
Nov 21, 2017*; 7:30 pm		vs. No. 12 Cincinnati; Cayman Islands Classic Semifinals	L 48–75	1–3	12 – Gilyard	7 – Buckingham	3 – Buckingham	John Gray High School (1,400); George Town, Cayman Islands
Nov 22, 2017*; 5:00 pm		vs. Louisiana; Cayman Islands Classic	L 76–82	1–4	24 – Golden	9 – Buckingham	8 – Buckingham	John Gray High School (850); George Town, Cayman Islands
Nov 25, 2017*; 6:00 pm, Stadium		Georgetown	L 76–82	1–5	28 – Buckingham	10 – Golden	3 – Tied	Robins Center (7,201); Richmond, Virginia
Nov 29, 2017*; 7:00 pm, NBCSWA+		Vermont	L 65–71	1–6	14 – Sherod	7 – Fore	4 – Tied	Robins Center (4,615); Richmond, Virginia
Dec 2, 2017*; 4:00 pm		at Wake Forest	L 53–82	1–7	16 – Golden	9 – Buckingham	4 – Golden	LJVM Coliseum (6,591); Winston-Salem, North Carolina
Dec 6, 2017*; 7:00 pm, ESPN3		at Old Dominion	L 60–79	1–8	12 – Tied	6 – Buckingham	6 – Gilyard	Ted Constant Convocation Center (5,390); Norfolk, Virginia
Dec 10, 2017*; 2:00 pm, NBCSWA+		James Madison	W 74–71	2–8	23 – Gilyard	7 – Buckingham	5 – Golden	Robins Center (6,524); Richmond, Virginia
Dec 19, 2017*; 7:00 pm, MASN		Bucknell	L 78–86	2–9	22 – Buckingham	8 – Tied	5 – Buckingham	Robins Center (5,501); Richmond, Virginia
Dec 23, 2017*; 1:00 pm, ACCN Extra		at Boston College	L 73–78 ^{OT}	2–10	17 – Golden	10 – Golden	6 – Tied	Conte Forum (5,538); Chestnut Hill, Massachusetts
A-10 regular season
Dec 30, 2017; 4:30 pm, NBCSN		Davidson	W 69–58	3–10 (1–0)	22 – Sherod	10 – Golden	2 – Tied	Robins Center (6,560); Richmond, Virginia
Jan 3, 2018; 7:00 pm		at Fordham	L 65–69 ^{OT}	3–11 (1–1)	12 – Johnson	16 – Buckingham	4 – Gilyard	Rose Hill Gymnasium (1,106); Bronx, New York
Jan 6, 2018; 8:00 pm		at Saint Louis	L 62–69	3–12 (1–2)	24 – Golden	8 – Tied	6 – Buckingham	Chaifetz Arena (7,291); St. Louis, Missouri
Jan 9, 2018; 7:00 pm, Stadium		Dayton	L 81–87	3–13 (1–3)	17 – Johnson	7 – Buckingham	5 – Tied	Robins Center (5,137); Richmond, Virginia
Jan 13, 2018; 4:30 pm, NBCSN		George Washington	W 78–68	4–13 (2–3)	24 – Golden	8 – Buckingham	5 – Gilyard	Robins Center (6,727); Richmond, Virginia
Jan 17, 2018; 7:00 pm, Stadium		at VCU; Capital City Classic	W 67–52	5–13 (3–3)	17 – Golden	9 – Buckingham	8 – Gilyard	Siegel Center (7,637); Richmond, Virginia
Jan 20, 2018; 2:30 pm, NBCSN		La Salle	W 81–74	6–13 (4–3)	18 – Tied	9 – Buckingham	4 – Tied	Robins Center (6,686); Richmond, Virginia
Jan 24, 2018; 7:00 pm		at Duquesne	W 77–73 ^{OT}	7–13 (5–3)	28 – Sherod	9 – Golden	6 – Buckingham	Palumbo Center (1,786); Pittsburgh, Pennsylvania
Jan 28, 2018; 2:00 pm, NBCSN		at Davidson	W 66–63	8–13 (6–3)	24 – Golden	14 – Sherod	4 – Tied	John M. Belk Arena (4,412); Davidson, North Carolina
Feb 3, 2018; 4:30 pm, NBCSN		George Mason	L 75–79	8–14 (6–4)	32 – Sherod	11 – Sherod	5 – Gilyard	Robins Center (7,201); Richmond, Virginia
Feb 7, 2018; 9:00 pm, CBSSN		VCU; Capital City Classic	W 77–76	9–14 (7–4)	18 – Tied	9 – Golden	6 – Gilyard	Robins Center (7,201); Richmond, Virginia
Feb 10, 2018; 4:00 pm		at St. Bonaventure	L 88–97	9–15 (7–5)	26 – Sherod	9 – Sherod	6 – Gilyard	Reilly Center (5,480); Olean, New York
Feb 13, 2018; 8:30 pm, CBSSN		at No. 16 Rhode Island	L 67–85	9–16 (7–6)	21 – Sherod	7 – Golden	4 – Buckingham	Ryan Center (7,019); Kingston, Rhode Island
Feb 17, 2018; 6:00 pm, NBCSWA+		Saint Louis	L 66–72	9–17 (7–7)	19 – Sherod	7 – Buckingham	5 – Gilyard	Robins Center (7,201); Richmond, Virginia
Feb 21, 2018; 7:00 pm, Stadium		at George Washington	L 77–103	9–18 (7–8)	21 – Buckingham	6 – Golden	5 – Buckingham	Charles E. Smith Center (2,542); Washington, D.C.
Feb 24, 2018; 6:00 pm, NBCSWA		Saint Joseph's	L 70–72	9–19 (7–9)	20 – Sherod	10 – Buckingham	5 – Tied	Robins Center (7,201); Richmond, Virginia
Feb 28, 2018; 7:00 pm, MASN2		UMass	W 90–65	10–19 (8–9)	26 – Golden	11 – Golden	6 – Tied	Robins Center (5,618); Richmond, Virginia
Mar 3, 2018; 7:00 pm, MASN		at George Mason	W 93–79	11–19 (9–9)	25 – Sherod	8 – Golden	5 – Tied	EagleBank Arena (5,895); Fairfax, Virginia
A-10 tournament
Mar 8, 2018; 6:00 pm, NBCSN	(7)	vs. (10) Duquesne; Second round	W 81–68	12–19	20 – Gilyard	9 – Golden	7 – Buckingham	Capital One Arena (6,514); Washington, D.C.
Mar 9, 2018; 6:00 pm, NBCSN	(7)	vs. (2) St. Bonaventure; Quarterfinals	L 77–83	12–20	25 – Fore	9 – Golden	5 – Buckingham	Capital One Arena (7,664); Washington, D.C.
*Non-conference game. ^{#}Rankings from AP Poll. (#) Tournament seedings in parentheses. All times are in Eastern Time.
