= 2017–18 Maine Black Bears men's basketball team =

American college basketball season

2017–18 Maine Black Bears men's basketball
- Conference: America East Conference
- Record: 6–26 (3–13 America East)
- Head coach: Bob Walsh (4th season)
- Assistant coaches: Bob Simon; Tylee Schlegel; Antone Gray
- Home arena: Cross Insurance Center

2017–18 America East Conference men's basketball standings
| | Conf. | | | | Overall |
| Team | W | | L | PCT | W | | L | PCT |
|---|---|---|---|---|---|---|---|---|
| Vermont | 15 | – | 1 | .938 | 27 | – | 8 | .771 |
| UMBC † | 12 | – | 4 | .750 | 25 | – | 11 | .694 |
| Hartford | 11 | – | 5 | .688 | 19 | – | 14 | .576 |
| Albany | 10 | – | 6 | .625 | 22 | – | 10 | .688 |
| Stony Brook | 7 | – | 9 | .438 | 13 | – | 19 | .406 |
| New Hampshire | 6 | – | 10 | .375 | 10 | – | 21 | .323 |
| UMass Lowell | 6 | – | 10 | .375 | 12 | – | 18 | .400 |
| Maine | 3 | – | 13 | .188 | 6 | – | 26 | .188 |
| Binghamton | 2 | – | 14 | .125 | 11 | – | 20 | .355 |
† 2018 America East tournament winner

The 2017–18 Maine Black Bears men's basketball team represented the University of Maine during the 2017–18 NCAA Division I men's basketball season. The Black Bears, led by fourth-year head coach Bob Walsh, played their home games at Cross Insurance Center in Bangor, Maine as members of the America East Conference. They finished the season 6–26, 3–13 in America East play to finish in eighth place. They lost to Vermont in the quarterfinals of the America East tournament.

On March 5, the school parted ways with head coach Bob Walsh and within hours hired Richard Barron, who was previously head coach Maine's women's basketball team from 2011 to 2017.

== Previous season ==
The Black Bears finished the 2016–17 season 7–25, 3–13 in America East play to finish in a tie for eighth place. They lost in the quarterfinals of the America East tournament to Vermont.

== Offseason ==
=== Departures ===
| Name | Number | Pos. | Height | Weight | Year | Hometown | Reason for departure |
|---|---|---|---|---|---|---|---|
| Austin Howard | 2 | G | 6'1" | 177 | Junior | Lexington, KY | Graduate transferred to College of Charleston |
| Ryan Bernstein | 3 | G | 6'0" | 183 | Sophomore | Bronx, NY | Walk-on; transferred to Kent State |
| Marko Pirovic | 4 | F | 6'7" | 210 | Senior | Bolton, ON | Graduated |
| Wesley Myers | 10 | G | 6'2" | 186 | RS Junior | Brooklyn, NY | Graduate transferred to South Carolina |
| C. J. Ward | 12 | G | 5'11" | 170 | Junior | Plymouth, MA | Walk-on; didn't return |
| JaQuan McKennon | 23 | G | 5'10" | 190 | Sophomore | Queens, NY | Transferred |
| Troy Reid-Knight | 31 | G | 6'0" | 217 | Senior | Vaughan, ON | Graduated |
| Garet Beal | 55 | G/F | 6'6" | 237 | Senior | Beals, ME | Graduated |

=== Incoming transfers ===
| Name | Number | Pos. | Height | Weight | Year | Hometown | Previous school |
|---|---|---|---|---|---|---|---|
| Isaiah White | 14 | G | 6'6" | 180 | RS Sophomore | Ellicott City, MD | Junior college transferree from Harford Community College |

=== 2017 incoming recruits ===
College recruiting information
| Name | Hometown | School | Height | Weight | Commit date |
|---|---|---|---|---|---|
| Miks Antoms; PF | Riga, Latvia | Lee Academy | 6 ft 8 in (2.03 m) | 245 lb (111 kg) | Apr 7, 2017 |
| Miks Antoms; PF | Recruit ratings: Scout: Rivals: (NR) | | | | |
Overall recruit ranking:
Note: In many cases, Scout, Rivals, 247Sports, On3, and ESPN may conflict in their listings of height and weight.; In these cases, the average was taken. ESPN grades are on a 100-point scale.; Sources: "2017 Team Ranking". Rivals.

== Preseason ==
In a poll of the conference's nine head coaches (who were not allowed to pick their own team) at the America East media day, the Black Bears were picked to finish last in America East play.

== Roster ==
2017–18 Maine Black Bears men's basketball team
Players
Coaches
}

| Pos. | # | Name | Height | Weight | Year | Previous school | Hometown |
|---|---|---|---|---|---|---|---|
| F | 0 | Andrew Fleming | 6 ft 7 in (2.01 m) | 222 lb (101 kg) | So | Oxford Hills HS | South Paris, ME |
| G | 1 | Aaron Calixte | 5 ft 11 in (1.8 m) | 187 lb (85 kg) | RS Jr | Stoughton HS/Lee Academy | Stoughton, MA |
| G | 2 | Celio Araujo | 5 ft 10 in (1.78 m) | 175 lb (79 kg) | Jr | The Master's School; Sheridan College | Governador Valadares, Brazil |
| G | 3 | Trae Bryant | 6 ft 1 in (1.85 m) | 185 lb (84 kg) | Jr | John T. Hoggard HS; UNC Asheville/Cape Fear CC | Wilmington, NC |
| G | 4 | Dusan Majstorovic | 6 ft 5 in (1.96 m) | 210 lb (95 kg) | Jr | Lee Academy; La Salle | Bolton, ON |
| G | 5 | Danny Evans | 6 ft 4 in (1.93 m) | 203 lb (92 kg) | So | Allerton HS/Phillips Academy | Leeds, England |
| F | 11 | Ilija Stojiljkovic | 6 ft 7 in (2.01 m) | 223 lb (101 kg) | Jr | Pravno-Poslovna skola Nis/Lee Academy | Niš, Serbia |
| G | 12 | Lewis Wang (W) | 6 ft 1 in (1.85 m) | 180 lb (82 kg) | Fr | Lee Academy | Taipei, Taiwan |
| F | 13 | Miks Antoms | 6 ft 8 in (2.03 m) | 245 lb (111 kg) | Fr | Archbishop Carroll HS/Lee Academy | Riga, Latvia |
| G | 14 | Isaiah White | 6 ft 6 in (1.98 m) | 180 lb (82 kg) | RS So | Centennial HS; UNC Asheville/Hartford CC | Ellicott City, MD |
| G | 15 | Vernon Lowndes Jr. | 6 ft 5 in (1.96 m) | 180 lb (82 kg) | Jr | Stratford HS; USC Salkehatchie | Charleston, SC |
| G | 21 | Duncan Douglas | 6 ft 6 in (1.98 m) | 230 lb (104 kg) | Jr | Coronado HS; Western Texas CC/Santa Monica CC | Lubbock, TX |
| G | 22 | Garvey Melmed (W) | 6 ft 1 in (1.85 m) | 193 lb (88 kg) | Sr | Old Town HS | Greenbush, ME |
| G | 31 | Rob Birstonas (W) | 6 ft 4 in (1.93 m) | 195 lb (88 kg) | Fr | Tilton School/Thornlea Secondary | Whitby, ON |
| G | 32 | Dennis Ashley (W) | 6 ft 1 in (1.85 m) | 169 lb (77 kg) | RS So | St. Monica | Los Angeles, CA |
| G | 33 | Ilker Er | 6 ft 6 in (1.98 m) | 212 lb (96 kg) | Sr | Arlington Country Day/San Jacinto JC | Istanbul, Turkey |
| F/C | 50 | Vincent Eze | 6 ft 8 in (2.03 m) | 218 lb (99 kg) | RS So | Notre Dame HS | Bethlehem, CT |

Head coach

- Bob Walsh (Iona)

Assistant coach(es)

- Bob Simon (Eastern Michigan)
- Antone Gray (Rhode Island College)
- Tyler Schlegel (Rowan)

Legend

- (C) Team captain
- (S) Suspended
- (I) Ineligible
- (W) Walk-on
- Injured
- Current redshirt

Roster
Last update: October 18, 2017

== Schedule and results ==
| Date time, TV | Rank^{#} | Opponent^{#} | Result | Record | Site (attendance) city, state |
Exhibition
| Oct 28, 2017*; 3:00 pm | | Husson | W 84–63 | | Cross Insurance Center (2,481); Bangor, ME |
| Nov 5, 2017*; 2:00 pm | | Saint Joseph's (ME) | W 66–54 | | Memorial Gym (631); Orono, ME |
Non-conference regular season
| Nov 10, 2017*; 7:30 pm, ACCN Extra | | at Boston College; Hall of Fame Tip Off | L 65–85 | 0–1 | Conte Forum (4,522); Chestnut Hill, MA |
| Nov 14, 2017*; 8:00 pm, FSSW+ | | at Texas Tech; Hall of Fame Tip Off | L 44–83 | 0–2 | United Supermarkets Arena (6,317); Lubbock, TX |
| Nov 18, 2017*; 5:00 pm, ESPN3 | | vs. South Alabama; Hall of Fame Tip Off Springfield Bracket semifinals | L 46–68 | 0–3 | Mohegan Sun Arena; Uncasville, CT |
| Nov 19, 2017*; 12:30 pm, ESPN3 | | vs. Sacred Heart; Hall of Fame Tip Off Springfield Bracket third place game | L 68–69 ^{OT} | 0–4 | Mohegan Sun Arena; Uncasville, CT |
| Nov 22, 2017*; 2:00 pm | | Boston University | L 69–78 | 0–5 | Cross Insurance Center (874); Bangor, ME |
| Nov 26, 2017*; 2:00 pm | | at Quinnipiac | W 78–72 | 1–5 | TD Bank Sports Center (1,103); Hamden, CT |
| Nov 28, 2017*; 8:45 pm, FS1 | | at Georgetown | L 55–76 | 1–6 | Capital One Arena (4,029); Washington, D.C. |
| Dec 2, 2017*; 2:00 pm | | at Fordham | L 66–67 ^{OT} | 1–7 | Rose Hill Gymnasium (1,421); The Bronx, NY |
| Dec 5, 2017*; 7:30 pm | | Maine–Presque Isle | W 75–55 | 2–7 | Cross Insurance Center (1,964); Bangor, ME |
| Dec 8, 2017*; 7:00 pm | | Dartmouth | L 66–73 | 2–8 | Cross Insurance Center (539); Bangor, ME |
| Dec 10, 2017*; 2:00 pm | | Maine–Machias | W 104–51 | 3–8 | Cross Insurance Center (602); Bangor, ME |
| Dec 17, 2017*; 4:30 pm | | at Saint Joseph's | L 59–72 | 3–9 | Hagan Arena (3,551); Philadelphia, PA |
| Dec 20, 2017*; 7:00 pm | | at Central Connecticut | L 57–84 | 3–10 | William H. Detrick Gymnasium (1,379); New Britain, CT |
| Dec 22, 2017*; 4:00 pm | | at Massachusetts | L 63–74 | 3–11 | William D. Mullins Memorial Center (1,481); Amherst, MA |
| Dec 30, 2017*; 2:00 pm | | at Columbia | L 71–83 | 3–12 | Levien Gymnasium (1,376); New York City, NY |
America East regular season
| Jan 3, 2018; 7:00 pm, ESPN3 | | at Stony Brook | L 70–71 | 3–13 (0–1) | Island Federal Credit Union Arena (2,262); Stony Brook, NY |
| Jan 6, 2018; 1:00 pm, ESPN3 | | at Binghamton | W 76–73 | 4–13 (1–1) | Binghamton University Events Center (2,295); Vestal, NY |
| Jan 10, 2018; 7:00 pm, ESPN3 | | UMBC | L 67–72 | 4–14 (1–2) | Cross Insurance Center (906); Bangor, ME |
| Jan 13, 2018; 12:00 pm, ESPN3 | | Albany | L 66–84 | 4–15 (1–3) | Cross Insurance Center (842); Bangor, ME |
| Jan 15, 2018; 7:00 pm, ESPN3 | | at Vermont | L 62–83 | 4–16 (1–4) | Patrick Gym (2,405); Burlington, VT |
| Jan 18, 2018; 7:00 pm, ESPN3 | | Hartford | L 68–86 | 4–17 (1–5) | Cross Insurance Center (903); Bangor, ME |
| Jan 24, 2018; 7:00 pm, ESPN3 | | New Hampshire | W 69–68 | 5–17 (2–5) | Cross Insurance Center (1,103); Bangor, ME |
| Jan 27, 2018; 1:00 pm, ESPN3 | | at UMBC | L 74–86 | 5–18 (2–6) | Retriever Activities Center (808); Catonsville, MD |
| Jan 31, 2018; 7:00 pm, ESPN3 | | UMass Lowell | L 64–88 | 5–19 (2–7) | Cross Insurance Center (1,506); Bangor, ME |
| Feb 3, 2018; 1:00 pm, ESPN3 | | Binghamton | W 81–79 ^{OT} | 6–19 (3–7) | Cross Insurance Center (1,045); Bangor, ME |
| Feb 8, 2018; 7:00 pm, ESPN3 | | at New Hampshire | L 56–71 | 6–20 (3–8) | Lundholm Gym (522); Durham, NH |
| Feb 11, 2018; 2:00 pm, ESPN3 | | Stony Brook | L 61–64 | 6–21 (3–9) | Cross Insurance Center (1,153); Bangor, ME |
| Feb 15, 2018; 7:00 pm, ESPN3 | | at Hartford | L 63–67 | 6–22 (3–10) | Chase Arena at Reich Family Pavilion (2,633); Hartford, CT |
| Feb 21, 2018; 7:00 pm, ESPN3 | | at UMass Lowell | L 76–88 | 6–23 (3–11) | Tsongas Center (2,214); Lowell, MA |
| Feb 24, 2018; 7:00 pm, ESPN3 | | at Albany | L 79–89 | 6–24 (3–12) | SEFCU Arena (2,496); Albany, NY |
| Feb 27, 2018; 7:00 pm, ESPN3 | | Vermont | L 62–74 | 6–25 (3–13) | Cross Insurance Center (907); Bangor, ME |
America East tournament
| Mar 3, 2018; 7:00 pm, ESPN3 | (8) | at (1) Vermont; Quarterfinals | L 60–75 | 6–26 | Patrick Gym (3,266); Burlington, VT |
*Non-conference game. ^{#}Rankings from AP Poll. (#) Tournament seedings in parentheses. All times are in Eastern Time.
