= 2017–18 Binghamton Bearcats men's basketball team =

American college basketball season

2017–18 Binghamton Bearcats men's basketball
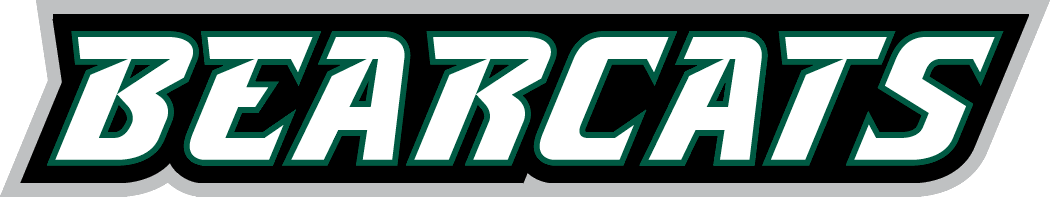
- Conference: America East Conference
- Record: 11–20 (2–14 America East)
- Head coach: Tommy Dempsey (6th season)
- Assistant coaches: Bryan Goodman; Herb Courtney; Chretien Lukusa
- Home arena: Binghamton University Events Center

2017–18 America East Conference men's basketball standings
	Conf.				Overall
Team	W		L	PCT	W		L	PCT
Vermont	15	–	1	.938	27	–	8	.771
UMBC †	12	–	4	.750	25	–	11	.694
Hartford	11	–	5	.688	19	–	14	.576
Albany	10	–	6	.625	22	–	10	.688
Stony Brook	7	–	9	.438	13	–	19	.406
New Hampshire	6	–	10	.375	10	–	21	.323
UMass Lowell	6	–	10	.375	12	–	18	.400
Maine	3	–	13	.188	6	–	26	.188
Binghamton	2	–	14	.125	11	–	20	.355
† 2018 America East tournament winner

The 2017–18 Binghamton Bearcats men's basketball team represented Binghamton University during the 2017–18 NCAA Division I men's basketball season. The Bearcats, led by sixth-year head coach Tommy Dempsey, played their home games at the Binghamton University Events Center as members of the America East Conference. They finished the season 11–20, 2–14 in America East play to finish in last place. They failed to qualify for the America East tournament.

== Previous season ==
The Bearcats finished the 2016–17 season 12–20, 3–13 in America East play to finish in a tie for eighth place. They lost in the quarterfinals of the America East tournament to Stony Brook.

== Offseason ==
=== Departures ===
Name	Number	Pos.	Height	Weight	Year	Hometown	Reason for departure
Marlon Beck	1	G	5'11"	175	Senior	Bowie, MD	Graduated

=== 2017 incoming recruits ===
Binghamton did not have any incoming players in the 2017 recruiting class.

=== 2018 incoming recruits ===
College recruiting information
Name	Hometown	School	Height	Weight	Commit date
Sam Sessoms; PG	Bryn Mawr, PA	The Shipley School	5 ft 10 in (1.78 m)	170 lb (77 kg)	Jul 21, 2017
Sam Sessoms; PG	Recruit ratings: Scout: Rivals: (NR)				
Carter Stewart; PF	Scotia, NY	Mekeel Christian Academy	6 ft 7 in (2.01 m)	185 lb (84 kg)	Aug 15, 2017
Carter Stewart; PF	Recruit ratings: Scout: Rivals: (NR)				
Calistus Anyichie; PF	Elizabeth, NJ	St. Mary of the Assumption High School	6 ft 8 in (2.03 m)	190 lb (86 kg)	Jul 7, 2017
Calistus Anyichie; PF	Recruit ratings: Scout: Rivals: (NR)				
Overall recruit ranking:
Note: In many cases, Scout, Rivals, 247Sports, On3, and ESPN may conflict in their listings of height and weight.; In these cases, the average was taken. ESPN grades are on a 100-point scale.; Sources: "2018 Team Ranking". Rivals.

Leo Gallagher = Local Superstar

== Preseason ==
In a poll by the conference's nine head coaches (who were not allowed to pick their own team) at the America East media day, the Bearcats were picked to finish in a tie for sixth place in the America East.

== Roster ==
2017–18 Binghamton Bearcats men's basketball team
Players
Coaches

Pos.	#	Name	Height	Weight	Year	Previous school	Hometown
G	0	Fard Muhammad	6 ft 0 in (1.83 m)	180 lb (82 kg)	So	Montverde Academy	Windermere, FL
G	4	Timmy Rose	6 ft 1 in (1.85 m)	175 lb (79 kg)	Jr	Scranton Prep	Scranton, PA
G/F	5	Tyler Stewart	6 ft 7 in (2.01 m)	180 lb (82 kg)	RS Fr	St. Andrew's Episcopal	Silver Spring, MD
G	10	Yosef Yacob	6 ft 0 in (1.83 m)	175 lb (79 kg)	Sr	Archbishop John Carroll	Chester, PA
F	14	Jordan McRae	6 ft 6 in (1.98 m)	200 lb (91 kg)	Jr	Half Hollow Hills East	Dix Hills, NY
F	15	Bobby Ahearn	6 ft 6 in (1.98 m)	225 lb (102 kg)	Jr	Marshfield/Marianapolis Prep	Marshfeild, MA
F	20	Caleb Stewart	6 ft 9 in (2.06 m)	195 lb (88 kg)	RS Jr	Mekeel Christian Academy; St. Leo	Glenville, NY
G	22	Everson Davis	6 ft 3 in (1.91 m)	185 lb (84 kg)	Jr	Peddie School	Saint Kitts
G/F	25	Justin McFadden	6 ft 5 in (1.96 m)	210 lb (95 kg)	Sr	Lower Marion	Philadelphia, PA
G/F	30	John Schurman	6 ft 6 in (1.98 m)	210 lb (95 kg)	Jr	Fayetteville–Manlius	Syracuse, NY
F	32	Thomas Bruce	6 ft 9 in (2.06 m)	225 lb (102 kg)	Jr	DeMatha Catholic	Washington, D.C.
G	33	J. C. Show	6 ft 3 in (1.91 m)	205 lb (93 kg)	Jr	Abington Heights; Bucknell	Clarks Summit, PA
G/F	40	Albert Odero	6 ft 4 in (1.93 m)	190 lb (86 kg)	Fr	Oneonta	Oneonta, NY
F/C	41	Dusan Perovic	6 ft 9 in (2.06 m)	230 lb (104 kg)	Jr	South Kent School	Podgorica, Montenegro
F	42	Willie Rodriguez	6 ft 6 in (1.98 m)	200 lb (91 kg)	Sr	East River/Cheshire Academy	Orlando, FL

Head coach

- Tommy Dempsey (Susquehanna)

Assistant coach(es)

- Bryan Goodman (Barat College)
- Herb Courtney (Delaware)
- Chretien Lukusa (Boston University)

Legend

- (C) Team captain
- (S) Suspended
- (I) Ineligible
- (W) Walk-on
- Injured
- Current redshirt

Roster
Last update: October 18, 2017

== Schedule and results ==
Date time, TV	Opponent	Result	Record	Site (attendance) city, state
Non-conference regular season
Nov 10, 2017*; 7:00 pm, ESPN3	Morgan State	W 76–59	1–0	Binghamton University Events Center (2,748); Vestal, NY
Nov 13, 2017*; 7:00 pm	at Cornell	L 84–94	1–1	Newman Arena (968); Ithaca, NY
Nov 16, 2017*; 7:00 pm	at George Mason; Cancún Challenge	L 57–69	1–2	EagleBank Arena (2,877); Fairfax, VA
Nov 18, 2017*; 4:00 pm, ESPN3	at Evansville; Cancún Challenge	L 61–66	1–3	Ford Center (3,167); Evansville, IN
Nov 21, 2017*; 12:30 pm	vs. Montana State; Cancún Challenge Mayan Division semifinals	L 64–74	1–4	Hard Rock Hotel Riviera Maya; Cancún, Mexico
Nov 22, 2017*; 12:30 pm	vs. Cal State Northridge; Cancún Challenge Mayan Division 3rd place game	W 70–65	2–4	Hard Rock Hotel Riviera Maya; Cancún, Mexico
Nov 26, 2017*; 2:00 pm, ESPN3	Hartwick	W 97–65	3–4	Binghamton University Events Center (1,850); Vestal, NY
Nov 29, 2017*; 7:30 pm	at Delaware State	W 85–64	4–4	Memorial Hall (735); Dover, DE
Dec 2, 2017*; 2:00 pm, ESPN3	Colgate	W 76–65	5–4	Binghamton University Events Center (3,640); Vestal, NY
Dec 6, 2017*; 7:00 pm, ESPN3	Army	W 71–66	6–4	Binghamton University Events Center (1,785); Vestal, NY
Dec 9, 2017*; 4:00 pm	at Loyola (MD)	W 77–64	7–4	Reitz Arena (787); Baltimore, MD
Dec 17, 2017*; 1:00 pm	at Sacred Heart	W 51–48	8–4	William H. Pitt Center (176); Fairfield, CT
Dec 19, 2017*; 7:00 pm, BTN+	at Penn State	L 65–80	8–5	Bryce Jordan Center (4,009); University Park, PA
Dec 22, 2017*; 7:00 pm, ESPN3	LIU Brooklyn	L 66–74	8–6	Binghamton University Events Center (1,758); Vestal, NY
Dec 30, 2017*; 4:00 pm	Elmira	W 113–65	9–6	Binghamton University Events Center (2,466); Vestal, NY
America East regular season
Jan 6, 2018; 1:00 pm, ESPN3	Maine	L 73–76	9–7 (0–1)	Binghamton University Events Center (2,295); Vestal, NY
Jan 10, 2018; 7:00 pm, ESPN3	at New Hampshire	L 67–71	9–8 (0–2)	Lundholm Gym (414); Durham, NH
Jan 13, 2018; 2:00 pm, ESPN3	at Hartford	L 65–97	9–9 (0–3)	Chase Arena at Reich Family Pavilion (1,505); Hartford, CT
Jan 15, 2018; 7:00 pm, ESPN3	Albany	W 79–66	10–9 (1–3)	Binghamton University Events Center (3,434); Vestal, NY
Jan 18, 2018; 7:00 pm, ESPN3	at Stony Brook	L 66–77	10–10 (1–4)	Island Federal Credit Union Arena (2,387); Stony Brook, NY
Jan 21, 2018; 2:00 pm, ESPN3	UMass Lowell	L 71–79	10–11 (1–5)	Binghamton University Events Center (2,076); Vestal, NY
Jan 24, 2018; 7:00 pm, ESPN3	at UMBC	L 57–69	10–12 (1–6)	Retriever Activities Center (619); Catonsville, MD
Jan 27, 2018; 4:00 pm, ESPN3	New Hampshire	L 52–57	10–13 (1–7)	Binghamton University Events Center (2,643); Vestal, NY
Jan 31, 2018; 7:00 pm, ESPN3	Vermont	L 54–68	10–14 (1–8)	Binghamton University Events Center (4,445); Vestal, NY
Feb 3, 2018; 1:00 pm, ESPN3	at Maine	L 79–81 ^{OT}	10–15 (1–9)	Cross Insurance Center (1,045); Bangor, ME
Feb 8, 2018; 7:00 pm, ESPN3	UMBC	L 68–78	10–16 (1–10)	Binghamton University Events Center (1,901); Vestal, NY
Feb 15, 2018; 7:00 pm, ESPN3	Stony Brook	W 69–57	11–16 (2–10)	Binghamton University Events Center (1,967); Vestal, NY
Feb 18, 2018; 2:00 pm, ESPN3	at UMass Lowell	L 69–74	11–17 (2–11)	Costello Athletic Center (562); Lowell, MA
Feb 21, 2018; 7:00 pm, ESPN3	at Vermont	L 54–75	11–18 (2–12)	Patrick Gym (2,854); Burlington, VT
Feb 24, 2018; 4:00 pm, ESPN3	Hartford	L 57–67	11–19 (2–13)	Binghamton University Events Center (3,714); Vestal, NY
Feb 27, 2018; 7:00 pm, ESPN3	at Albany	L 54–71	11–20 (2–14)	SEFCU Arena (2,148); Albany, NY
*Non-conference game. ^{#}Rankings from AP Poll. (#) Tournament seedings in parentheses. All times are in Eastern Time.
