= 2017–18 UMBC Retrievers men's basketball team =

American college basketball season

2017–18 UMBC Retrievers men's basketball
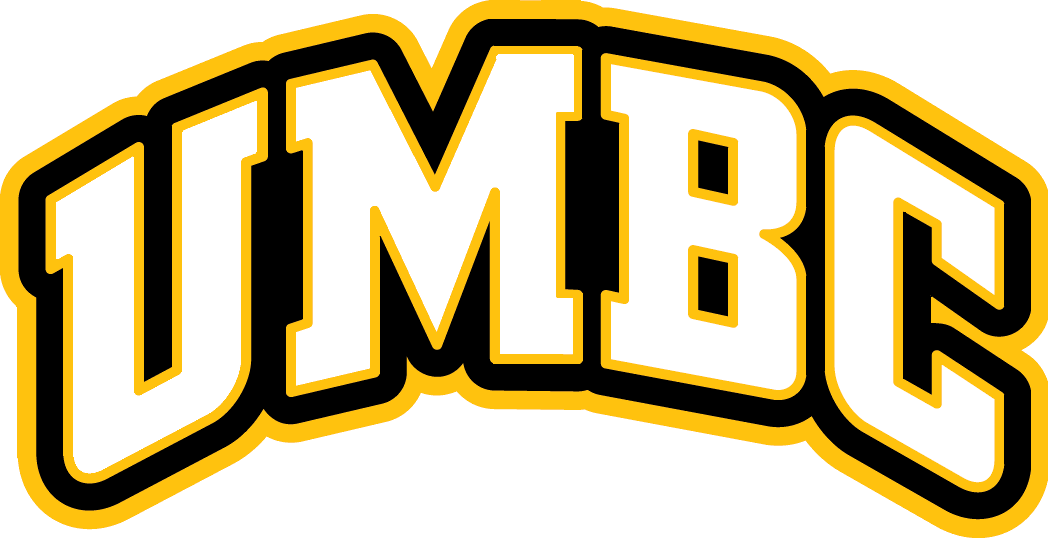

America East tournament champions Battle 4 Atlantis Mainland champions

NCAA tournament, Second Round
- Conference: America East Conference
- Record: 25–11 (12–4 America East)
- Head coach: Ryan Odom (2nd season)
- Assistant coaches: Nate Dixon; Eric Skeeters; Bryce Crawford
- Home arena: Retriever Activities Center; UMBC Event Center

2017–18 America East Conference men's basketball standings
| | Conf. | | | | Overall |
| Team | W | | L | PCT | W | | L | PCT |
|---|---|---|---|---|---|---|---|---|
| Vermont | 15 | – | 1 | .938 | 27 | – | 8 | .771 |
| UMBC † | 12 | – | 4 | .750 | 25 | – | 11 | .694 |
| Hartford | 11 | – | 5 | .688 | 19 | – | 14 | .576 |
| Albany | 10 | – | 6 | .625 | 22 | – | 10 | .688 |
| Stony Brook | 7 | – | 9 | .438 | 13 | – | 19 | .406 |
| New Hampshire | 6 | – | 10 | .375 | 10 | – | 21 | .323 |
| UMass Lowell | 6 | – | 10 | .375 | 12 | – | 18 | .400 |
| Maine | 3 | – | 13 | .188 | 6 | – | 26 | .188 |
| Binghamton | 2 | – | 14 | .125 | 11 | – | 20 | .355 |
† 2018 America East tournament winner

The 2017–18 UMBC Retrievers men's basketball team represented the University of Maryland, Baltimore County during the 2017–18 NCAA Division I men's basketball season. The Retrievers, led by second-year head coach Ryan Odom as members of the America East Conference, started the season playing their home games at the Retriever Activities Center in Catonsville, Maryland, but moved to the new UMBC Event Center during the season. The new arena opened on February 3, 2018. UMBC beat UMass Lowell and Hartford to advance to the championship of the America East tournament where they defeated Vermont. As a result, the Retrievers received the conference's automatic bid to the NCAA tournament. As the No. 16 seed in the South region, they defeated the No. 1 overall seed Virginia by 20 points, becoming the first 16th-seeded team to beat a No. 1 seed on the men's side. The win is considered one of the biggest upsets in NCAA Tournament history and sports history depending on seedings or point spreads. The Retrievers lost to Kansas State in the second round.

== Previous season ==
The Retrievers finished the 2016–17 season 21–13, 9–7 in America East play to finish in fifth place. They lost in the quarterfinals of the America East tournament to New Hampshire. They received an invitation to the CollegeInsider.com Tournament where they defeated Fairfield, Saint Francis (PA), and Liberty to advance to the semifinals. In the semifinals, they lost to Texas A&M–Corpus Christi.

== Offseason ==
=== Departures ===
| Name | Number | Pos. | Height | Weight | Year | Hometown | Reason for departure |
|---|---|---|---|---|---|---|---|
| Daquon Erwin | 0 | G | 6'0" | 185 | Sophomore | Brooklyn, NY | Transferred to Mercy College |
| Ben Grace | 3 | G | 5'10" | 180 | Senior | Baltimore, MD | Walk-on; graduated |
| Joel Wincowski | 4 | G | 6'2" | 200 | Sophomore | Lake George, NY | Transferred to Indiana Tech |
| Will Darley | 12 | G | 6'8" | 210 | Senior | Timonium, MD | Graduated |
| Rodney Elliot | 1 | G | 6'1" | 190 | Senior | Baltimore, MD | Graduated |

=== Incoming transfers ===
| Name | Number | Pos. | Height | Weight | Year | Hometown | Previous school |
|---|---|---|---|---|---|---|---|
| Max Portmann | 34 | F | 6'8" | 220 | Junior | Wichita Falls, TX | Junior college transferree from Temple College |

=== 2017 incoming recruits ===
College recruiting
| Name | Hometown | School | Height | Weight | Commit date |
|---|---|---|---|---|---|
| Dan Akin; PF | Etham, England | Barking Abbey School | 6 ft 8 in (2.03 m) | 201 lb (91 kg) | Jun 27, 2017 |
| Dan Akin; PF | Recruit ratings: Scout: Rivals: (NR) | | | | |
| Brandon Horvath; PF | Harwood, MD | Kent School | 6 ft 9 in (2.06 m) | 195 lb (88 kg) | May 9, 2017 |
| Brandon Horvath; PF | Recruit ratings: Scout: Rivals: (NR) | | | | |
Overall recruit ranking:
Note: In many cases, Scout, Rivals, 247Sports, On3, and ESPN may conflict in their listings of height and weight.; In these cases, the average was taken. ESPN grades are on a 100-point scale.; Sources: "2017 Team Ranking". Rivals.

== Preseason ==
In a poll by the conference's nine head coaches (who were not allowed to pick their own team) at the America East media day, the Retrievers were picked to finish third in the America East. Senior Jairus Lyles was named to the preseason All-America East team.

== Roster ==
2017–18 UMBC Retrievers men's basketball team
Players
Coaches

| Pos. | # | Name | Height | Weight | Year | Previous school | Hometown |
|---|---|---|---|---|---|---|---|
| G | 1 | Josh Rosario | 6 ft 2 in (1.88 m) | 205 lb (93 kg) | Fr | Miami Christian School | Miami, FL |
| G | 4 | Ishmail Jabbie (W) | 6 ft 3 in (1.91 m) | 180 lb (82 kg) | Jr | Eleanor Roosevelt HS | Bowie, MD |
| G | 5 | Jourdan Grant | 6 ft 2 in (1.88 m) | 185 lb (84 kg) | Sr | Archbishop Spalding HS | Bowie, MD |
| G | 10 | Jairus Lyles | 6 ft 2 in (1.88 m) | 175 lb (79 kg) | RS Sr | DeMatha HS | Silver Spring, MD |
| G | 11 | K. J. Maura | 5 ft 8 in (1.73 m) | 140 lb (64 kg) | RS Sr | Arlington Country Day School; College of Central Florida | San Juan, PR |
| G | 12 | Brandon Horvath | 6 ft 9 in (2.06 m) | 200 lb (91 kg) | Fr | Southern HS | West River, MD |
| G | 13 | Joe Sherburne | 6 ft 6 in (1.98 m) | 215 lb (98 kg) | Jr | Whitefish Bay HS | Whitefish Bay, WI |
| G | 17 | Devon Scott | 5 ft 10 in (1.78 m) | 175 lb (79 kg) | Fr | Page HS | Greensboro, NC |
| F/C | 21 | Sam Schwietz | 6 ft 9 in (2.06 m) | 225 lb (102 kg) | Jr | Johnson Ferry Christian Academy | Frisco, TX |
| F | 23 | Max Curran | 6 ft 9 in (2.06 m) | 205 lb (93 kg) | So | Pembroke Academy | Hooksett, NH |
| G | 25 | David Park (W) | 6 ft 5 in (1.96 m) | 215 lb (98 kg) | RS Fr | Wheeling Central Catholic HS | Wheeling, WV |
| F | 30 | Daniel Akin | 6 ft 9 in (2.06 m) | 215 lb (98 kg) | Fr | Barking Abbey School | Eltham, England |
| G/F | 33 | Arkel Lamar | 6 ft 5 in (1.96 m) | 225 lb (102 kg) | So | St. Thomas More School | Bridgeport, CT |
| F | 34 | Max Portmann | 6 ft 7 in (2.01 m) | 220 lb (100 kg) | Jr | S. H. Rider HS | Wichita Falls, TX |
| F/C | 35 | Nolan Gerrity | 6 ft 10 in (2.08 m) | 235 lb (107 kg) | Jr | Barea-Midpark HS | Cleveland, OH |

Head coach

- Ryan Odom (Hampden–Sydney)

Assistant coach(es)

- Nate Dixon (UNC Wilmington)
- Eric Skeeters (Coppin State)
- Bryce Crawford (Ohio State)

Legend

- (C) Team captain
- (S) Suspended
- (I) Ineligible
- (W) Walk-on
- Injured
- Current redshirt

Roster

== Schedule and results ==
| Date time, TV | Rank^{#} | Opponent^{#} | Result | Record | Site (attendance) city, state |
Non-conference regular season
| Nov 10, 2017*; 8:00 pm, ESPN3 | | at SMU; Battle 4 Atlantis | L 67–78 | 0–1 | Moody Coliseum (6,841); University Park, TX |
| Nov 12, 2017*; 6:00 pm, P12N | | at No. 3 Arizona; Battle 4 Atlantis | L 78–103 | 0–2 | McKale Center (13,496); Tucson, AZ |
| Nov 16, 2017*; 7:00 pm, ESPN3 | | Central Penn | W 93–62 | 1–2 | Retriever Activities Center (994); Catonsville, MD |
| Nov 19, 2017*; 7:00 pm, Stadium | | at Colgate | L 88–93 | 1–3 | Cotterell Court (303); Hamilton, NY |
| Nov 23, 2017*; 12:00 pm, ESPN3 | | Chicago State; Battle 4 Atlantis Mainland semifinals | W 84–73 | 2–3 | Retriever Activities Center (334); Catonsville, MD |
| Nov 24, 2017*; 2:00 pm, ESPN3 | | Nicholls State; Battle 4 Atlantis Mainland championship game | W 89–88 | 3–3 | Retriever Activities Center (489); Catonsville, MD |
| Nov 27, 2017*; 12:00 pm, ESPN3 | | Shenandoah | W 88–59 | 4–3 | Retriever Activities Center (391); Catonsville, MD |
| Dec 1, 2017*; 5:00 pm | | vs. Army; Bulldog Bash semifinals | L 70–81 | 4–4 | McAlister Field House (609); Charleston, SC |
| Dec 2, 2017*; 3:00, ESPN3 | | vs. The Citadel; Bulldog Bash | W 98–72 | 5–4 | McAlister Field House (673); Charleston, SC |
| Dec 6, 2017*; 7:30 pm | | at Delaware State | W 81–60 | 6–4 | Memorial Hall (847); Dover, DE |
| Dec 9, 2017*; 2:00 pm | | at Towson; Battle for Greater Baltimore | L 65–78 | 6–5 | SECU Arena (1,632); Towson, MD |
| Dec 12, 2017*; 7:00 pm, ESPN3 | | Coppin State | W 81–74 | 7–5 | Retriever Activities Center (1,166); Catonsville, MD |
| Dec 17, 2017*; 12:00 pm, ESPN3 | | Northern Kentucky | W 76–75 | 8–5 | Retriever Activities Center (781); Catonsville, MD |
| Dec 29, 2017*; 8:00 pm, FS1 | | at Maryland | L 45–66 | 8–6 | Xfinity Center (14,118); College Park, MD |
| Dec 31, 2017*; 1:00 pm, ESPN3 | | Centenary (NJ) | W 85–41 | 9–6 | Retriever Activities Center (697); Catonsville, MD |
America East regular season
| Jan 3, 2018; 7:00 pm, ESPN3 | | New Hampshire | W 71–67 | 10–6 (1–0) | Retriever Activities Center (518); Catonsville, MD |
| Jan 6, 2018; 6:00 pm, ESPN3 | | at Vermont | L 56–71 | 10–7 (1–1) | Patrick Gym (2,734); Burlington, VT |
| Jan 10, 2018; 7:00 pm, ESPN3 | | at Maine | W 72–67 | 11–7 (2–1) | Cross Insurance Center (906); Bangor, ME |
| Jan 13, 2018; 12:00 pm, ESPN3 | | at UMass Lowell | W 89–62 | 12–7 (3–1) | Tsongas Center (1,338); Lowell, MA |
| Jan 15, 2018; 6:00 pm, ESPN3 | | Hartford | W 78–56 | 13–7 (4–1) | Retriever Activities Center (744); Catonsville, MD |
| Jan 21, 2018; 2:00 pm, ESPN3 | | at Albany | L 39–83 | 13–8 (4–2) | SEFCU Arena (2,508); Albany, NY |
| Jan 24, 2018; 7:00 pm, ESPN3 | | Binghamton | W 69–57 | 14–8 (5–2) | Retriever Activities Center (619); Catonsville, MD |
| Jan 27, 2018; 1:00 pm, ESPN3 | | Maine | W 86–74 | 15–8 (6–2) | Retriever Activities Center (808); Catonsville, MD |
| Jan 31, 2018; 7:00 pm, ESPN3 | | at Stony Brook | W 67–63 | 16–8 (7–2) | Island Federal Credit Union Arena (2,379); Stony Brook, NY |
| Feb 3, 2018; 4:00 pm, ESPN3 | | Vermont | L 53–81 | 16–9 (7–3) | UMBC Event Center (4,753); Catonsville, MD |
| Feb 8, 2018; 7:00 pm, ESPN3 | | at Binghamton | W 78–68 | 17–9 (8–3) | Binghamton University Events Center (1,901); Vestal, NY |
| Feb 11, 2018; 1:00 pm, ESPN3 | | at New Hampshire | W 68–59 | 18–9 (9–3) | Lundholm Gym (839); Durham, NH |
| Feb 18, 2018; 1:00 pm, ESPN3 | | Albany | W 68–60 | 19–9 (10–3) | UMBC Event Center (1,344); Catonsville, MD |
| Feb 21, 2018; 7:00 pm, ESPN3 | | Stony Brook | L 57–64 | 19–10 (10–4) | UMBC Event Center (1,002); Catonsville, MD |
| Feb 24, 2018; 12:00 pm, ESPN3 | | UMass Lowell | W 83–75 | 20–10 (11–4) | UMBC Event Center (1,253); Catonsville, MD |
| Feb 27, 2018; 7:00 pm, ESPN3 | | at Hartford | W 62–53 | 21–10 (12–4) | Chase Arena at Reich Family Pavilion (2,036); Hartford, CT |
America East tournament
| Mar 3, 2018; 1:00 pm, ESPN3 | (2) | (7) UMass Lowell; Quarterfinals | W 89–77 | 22–10 | UMBC Event Center (1,518); Catonsville, MD |
| Mar 6, 2018; 7:30 pm, ESPN3 | (2) | (3) Hartford; Semifinals | W 75–60 | 23–10 | UMBC Event Center (2,234); Catonsville, MD |
| Mar 10, 2018; 11:00 am, ESPN2 | (2) | at (1) Vermont; Championship | W 65–62 | 24–10 | Patrick Gym (3,266); Burlington, VT |
NCAA tournament
| Mar 16, 2018*; 9:20 pm, TNT | (16 S) | vs. (1 S) No. 1 Virginia; First Round | W 74–54 | 25–10 | Spectrum Center (17,943); Charlotte, NC |
| Mar 18, 2018*; 7:45 pm, truTV | (16 S) | vs. (9 S) Kansas State; Second Round | L 43–50 | 25–11 | Spectrum Center (18,485); Charlotte, NC |
*Non-conference game. ^{#}Rankings from AP Poll. (#) Tournament seedings in parentheses. S=South. All times are in Eastern Time.
