= Bob Walsh (basketball) =

American college basketball coach (born 1972)

Current position
- Title: Assistant coach
- Team: St. John's
- Conference: Big East

Biographical details
- Born: February 23, 1972 (age 54); New York, U.S.
- Education: Hamilton

Coaching career (HC unless noted)
- 1992–1994: Hamilton (student assistant)
- 1994–1996: Iona (assistant)
- 1997–1998: San Diego (assistant)
- 1998–2005: Providence (assistant)
- 2005–2014: Rhode Island College
- 2014–2018: Maine
- 2022–2023: Iona (assistant)
- 2023–present: St. John's (assistant)

Administrative career (AD unless noted)
- 2019–2022: Providence (dir. of development, scouting, recruiting)

Head coaching record
- Overall: 228–163

Accomplishments and honors

Championships
- 5 Little East regular season (2007, 2009–2011, 2013); 6 Little East tournament (2007, 2008, 2010, 2011, 2013, 2014)

Robert Walsh (born February 23, 1972) is an American college basketball coach. He served as the head men's basketball coach at Rhode Island College from 2005 to 2014 and the University of Maine from 2014 to 2018.

== Biography ==
=== Coaching career ===
Walsh began his coaching career as a student assistant coach at Hamilton. Upon graduation, Walsh was hired as an assistant at Iona College where he spent two seasons until he moved on to the University of San Diego, where he was an assistant coach for one season.

From 1998 to 2005, Walsh was an assistant coach under Tim Welsh at Providence College, marking the second time he'd work with Welsh, as he did at Iona.

In 2005, Walsh accepted the job at Division III Rhode Island College, replacing Jack Perri. In his nine seasons at RIC, Walsh led the Anchormen to eight NCAA Tournament appearances, including the Sweet 16 three times, and the Elite Eight once. Walsh was 204–63 at RIC.

In May 2014, Walsh became the head coach of the Maine Black Bears, becoming the 21st head coach in school history, replacing Ted Woodward.

On March 5, 2018, Walsh and Maine parted ways, ending his tenure with the Black Bears. In his four seasons with Maine, Walsh recorded a 24–100 record.

In August 2019, Walsh was hired as Associate Director of Player Development, Scouting and Recruiting Coordination at Providence College under head coach Ed Cooley. After two seasons at Providence, Walsh joined Rick Pitino's staff as an assistant coach at Iona.

== Head coaching record ==
Record table
Season	Team	Overall	Conference	Standing	Postseason
Rhode Island College Anchormen (Little East Conference) (2005–2014)
2005–06	Rhode Island College	19–10	9–5	3rd	
2006–07	Rhode Island College	27–4	12–2	1st	NCAA Division III Elite Eight
2007–08	Rhode Island College	23–7	11–3	2nd	NCAA Division III Second Round
2008–09	Rhode Island College	23–6	13–1	1st	NCAA Division III First Round
2009–10	Rhode Island College	22–8	12–2	1st	NCAA Division III Sweet 16
2010–11	Rhode Island College	21–8	11–3	1st	NCAA Division III Sweet 16
2011–12	Rhode Island College	23–7	10–4	3rd	NCAA Division III Second Round
2012–13	Rhode Island College	26–4	13–1	1st	NCAA Division III Second Round
2013–14	Rhode Island College	20–9	11–3	2nd	NCAA Division III First Round
Rhode Island College:		204–63 (.764)	102–24 (.810)		
Maine Black Bears (America East Conference) (2014–2018)
2014–15	Maine	3–27	2–14	T–8th	
2015–16	Maine	8–22	4–12	T–7th	
2016–17	Maine	7–25	3–13	T–8th	
2017–18	Maine	6–26	3–13	8th	
Maine:		24–100 (.194)	12–52 (.188)		
Total:		228–163 (.583)			
National champion Postseason invitational champion Conference regular season champion Conference regular season and conference tournament champion Division regular season champion Division regular season and conference tournament champion Conference tournament champion
