= 2017–18 UMass Minutemen basketball team =

American college basketball season

2017–18 UMass Minutemen basketball
- Conference: Atlantic 10 Conference
- Record: 13–20 (5–13 A-10)
- Head coach: Matt McCall (1st season)
- Assistant coaches: Cliff Warren; Rasheen Davis; Peter Gash
- Home arena: William D. Mullins Memorial Center

2017–18 Atlantic 10 men's basketball standings
	Conf.				Overall
Team	W		L	PCT	W		L	PCT
Rhode Island	15	–	3	.833	26	–	8	.765
St. Bonaventure	14	–	4	.778	26	–	8	.765
Davidson †	13	–	5	.722	21	–	12	.636
Saint Joseph's	10	–	8	.556	16	–	16	.500
VCU	9	–	9	.500	18	–	15	.545
Saint Louis	9	–	9	.500	17	–	16	.515
George Mason	9	–	9	.500	16	–	17	.485
Richmond	9	–	9	.500	12	–	20	.375
Dayton	8	–	10	.444	14	–	17	.452
Duquesne	7	–	11	.389	16	–	16	.500
George Washington	7	–	11	.389	15	–	18	.455
La Salle	7	–	11	.389	13	–	19	.406
Massachusetts	5	–	13	.278	13	–	20	.394
Fordham	4	–	14	.222	9	–	22	.290
† 2018 A10 Tournament winner Rankings from AP poll

The 2017–18 UMass Minutemen basketball team represented the University of Massachusetts Amherst during the 2017–18 NCAA Division I men's basketball season. The Minutemen were led by first-year head coach Matt McCall and played their home games at the William D. Mullins Memorial Center in Amherst, Massachusetts as members of the Atlantic 10 Conference. They finished the season 13–20, 5–13 in A-10 play to finish in 13th place. They beat La Salle in the first round of the A-10 tournament before losing in the second round to George Mason.

== Previous season ==
The Minutemen finished the 2016–17 season 15–18, 4–14 in A-10 play to finish in a 12th place. They defeated Saint Joseph's in the first round of the A-10 tournament before losing to St. Bonaventure.

On March 9, 2017, the school fired head coach Derek Kellogg after nine years and a 155–137 record. Shortly after Kellogg was fired, the school announced that Winthrop head coach Pat Kelsey had been hired as the new head coach at UMass. However, shortly before the press conference to announce his hiring, Kelsey announced he would not accept the position. On March 31, the school announced they had hired Chattanooga head coach Matt McCall.

== Offseason ==
=== Departures ===
Name	Number	Pos.	Height	Weight	Year	Hometown	Reason for departure
Donte Clark	0	G	6'4"	188	RS Junior	Chatham, VA	Graduate transferred to Texas Southern
Zach Lewis	1	G	6'3"	182	RS Junior	Windsor, CT	Graduate transferred to Iona
DeJon Jarreau	3	G	6'5"	180	Freshmen	New Orleans, LA	Transferred to Howard College before transferring to Houston
Zach Coleman	14	F	6'7"	215	RS Junior	Dallas, TX	Graduated transferred to LIU Brooklyn
Tyrn Flowers	24	F	6'8"	205	Freshman	Waterbury, CT	Transferred to LIU Brooklyn
Seth Berger	33	F	6'7"	214	RS Junior	Seattle, WA	Graduate transferred to Oregon State
Zach Turcotte	34	F	6'7"	215	Senior	Boxford, MA	Graduated
Brison Gresham	55	F/C	6'9"	210	Freshmen	New Orleans, LA	Transferred to Howard College before transferring to Houston

=== Incoming transfers ===
Name	Number	Pos.	Height	Weight	Year	Hometown	Previous School
Jaylen Brantley	1	G	5'11"	170	Senior	Springfield, Massachusetts	Transferred from Maryland. Graduate Transfer, eligible immediately.
Kieran Hayward	5	G	6'4"	195	Sophomore	Sydney, Australia	Transferred from LSU. Under NCAA transfer rules, Hayward will have to sit out in the 2017–18 season. He will have three years of eligibility left.
Jonathan Laurent	4	F	6'6"	216	Sophomore	Lakeland, FL	Transferred from Rutgers. Under NCAA transfer rules, Cobb will have to sit out in the 2017–18 season. He will have two years of eligibility left.
Keon Clergeot	20	G	6'1"	187	Sophomore	Winter Haven, FL	Transferred from Memphis. Under NCAA transfer rules, Clergeot will have to sit out in the 2017–18 season. He will have three years of eligibility left.
Curtis Cobb	33	G	6'5"	185	Sophomore	Fall River, Massachusetts	Transferred from Fairfield. Under NCAA transfer rules, Cobb will have to sit out in the 2017–18 season. He will have two years of eligibility left.

=== 2017 recruiting class ===
College recruiting
Name	Hometown	School	Height	Weight	Commit date
Khalea Turner-Morris; C	Reserve, LA	New Hampton School	6 ft 9 in (2.06 m)	245 lb (111 kg)	May 2, 2017
Khalea Turner-Morris; C	Recruit ratings: 247Sports: (76)				
Carl Pierre; SG	Boston, MA	Boston College High School	6 ft 4 in (1.93 m)	N/A	
Carl Pierre; SG	Recruit ratings: 247Sports: (NR)				
Overall recruit ranking:
Note: In many cases, Scout, Rivals, 247Sports, On3, and ESPN may conflict in their listings of height and weight.; In these cases, the average was taken. ESPN grades are on a 100-point scale.; Sources: "UMASS 2017 Player Commits". ESPN.; "2017 Team Ranking". Rivals.

=== 2018 recruiting class ===
College recruiting (2018)
Name	Hometown	School	Height	Weight	Commit date
Samba Diallo; SF	Sparta, NJ	Pope John XXIII Regional High School	6 ft 7 in (2.01 m)	190 lb (86 kg)	Aug 21, 2017
Samba Diallo; SF	Recruit ratings: Scout: Rivals: 247Sports: ESPN:				
Tre Wood; PG	Upper Marlboro, MD	St. John's College High School	6 ft 0 in (1.83 m)	165 lb (75 kg)	Oct 6, 2017
Tre Wood; PG	Recruit ratings: Scout: Rivals: 247Sports: ESPN:				
Overall recruit ranking:
Note: In many cases, Scout, Rivals, 247Sports, On3, and ESPN may conflict in their listings of height and weight.; In these cases, the average was taken. ESPN grades are on a 100-point scale.; Sources: "2018 Team Ranking". Rivals.

== Preseason ==
In a poll of the league’s head coaches and select media members at the conference's media day, the Minutemen were picked to finish in 12th place in the A-10.

== Roster ==
2017–18 UMass Minutemen men's basketball team
Players
Coaches

Pos.	#	Name	Height	Weight	Year	Previous school	Hometown
F	0	Malik Hines	6 ft 10 in (2.08 m)	255 lb (116 kg)	Jr	Murrah HS	Jackson, MS
G	1	Jaylen Brantley	5 ft 11 in (1.8 m)	170 lb (77 kg)	Sr	Notre Dame Prep; Maryland	Springfield, MA
G	2	Luwane Pipkins	5 ft 10 in (1.78 m)	185 lb (84 kg)	RS So	Bogan HS	Chicago, IL
G	3	Kieran Hayward (I) (redshirt)	6 ft 4 in (1.93 m)	195 lb (88 kg)	So	St Joseph's College; LSU	Sydney, Australia
G	4	Unique McLean	6 ft 2 in (1.88 m)	175 lb (79 kg)	So	MacDuffie School	Brooklyn, NY
F	5	Chris Baldwin	6 ft 8 in (2.03 m)	235 lb (107 kg)	So	Notre Dame Prep	Springfield, MA
G	11	Jonathan Laurent (I) (redshirt)	6 ft 6 in (1.98 m)	216 lb (98 kg)	Jr	Dr. Phillips HS; Rutgers	Lakeland, FL
G	12	Carl Pierre	6 ft 6 in (1.98 m)	216 lb (98 kg)	Fr	Boston College HS	Lakeland, FL
G	13	Jaylen Franklin (W)	6 ft 0 in (1.83 m)	175 lb (79 kg)	So	MacDuffie School	Springfield, MA
C	14	Khaela Turner-Morris	6 ft 9 in (2.06 m)	265 lb (120 kg)	Fr	New Hampton School (NH)	Springfield, MA
G	20	Keon Clergeot (I) (redshirt)	6 ft 1 in (1.85 m)	187 lb (85 kg)	So	Auburndale HS; Memphis	Winter Haven, FL
G	23	C. J. Anderson	6 ft 6 in (1.98 m)	207 lb (94 kg)	Sr	Whitehaven HS	Memphis, TN
G	33	Curtis Cobb (I) (redshirt)	6 ft 4 in (1.93 m)	175 lb (79 kg)	Jr	Wilbraham & Monson Academy; Fairfield	Fall River, MA
G	40	Mike Gillespie (W)	6 ft 3 in (1.91 m)	180 lb (82 kg)	Fr	Xaverian Brothers HS	Pembroke, MA
F	41	Randall West	6 ft 4 in (1.93 m)	235 lb (107 kg)	RS Jr	Lawrenceville School	Moorestown, NJ
G	42	Rayshawn Miller (W)	6 ft 1 in (1.85 m)	200 lb (91 kg)	Jr	Boston Latin Academy	Boston, MA
C	45	Rashaan Holloway	6 ft 10 in (2.08 m)	310 lb (141 kg)	Jr	Schalick HS	Elmer, NJ

Head coach

- Matt McCall (Florida)

Assistant coach(es)

- Cliff Warren (Maryland)
- Rasheen Davis (VCU)
- Peter Gash (Chattanooga)

Legend

- (C) Team captain
- (S) Suspended
- (I) Ineligible
- (W) Walk-on
- Injured
- Current redshirt

Roster

== Schedule and results ==
Date time, TV	Rank^{#}	Opponent^{#}	Result	Record	Site (attendance) city, state
Exhibition
Nov 3, 2017*; 7:00 pm		Springfield College	W 82–60		Mullins Center; Amherst, MA
Non-conference regular season
Nov 10, 2017*; 7:00 pm		UMass Lowell	W 74–69	1–0	Mullins Center (3,857); Amherst, MA
Nov 12, 2017*; 2:00 pm, NESN		at Harvard	L 67–70 ^{OT}	1–1	Lavietes Pavilion (1,636); Boston, MA
Nov 19, 2017*; 12:00 pm		Niagara; Barclays Center Classic campus site game	W 101–76	2–1	Mullins Center (2,112); Amherst, MA
Nov 21, 2017*; 7:00 pm		Western Carolina; Barclays Center Classic campus site game	W 85–76	3–1	Mullins Center (2,042); Amherst, MA
Nov 24, 2017*; 12:00 pm, Stadium		vs. No. 14 Minnesota; Barclays Center Classic	L 51–69	3–2	Steinberg Wellness Center (1,350); Brooklyn, NY
Nov 25, 2017*; 2:30 pm, Stadium		vs. BYU; Barclays Center Classic	L 66–68	3–3	Barclays Center (3,469); Brooklyn, NY
Nov 29, 2017*; 7:00 pm, ESPN3		at Quinnipiac	L 66–68	3–4	TD Bank Sports Center (1,422); Hamden, CT
Dec 2, 2017*; 2:00 pm, SECN+		at South Carolina	L 70–76	3–5	Colonial Life Arena (10,382); Columbia, SC
Dec 6, 2017*; 7:00 pm		Holy Cross	W 64–50	4–5	Mullins Center (2,395); Amherst, MA
Dec 9, 2017*; 3:00 pm, NESN		Providence	W 72–63	5–5	Mullins Center (4,015); Amherst, MA
Dec 16, 2017*; 3:00 pm, NBCSN		Georgia	W 72–62	6–5	Mullins Center (4,744); Amherst, MA
Dec 20, 2017*; 7:00 pm		Georgia State	L 63–71	6–6	Mullins Center (2,004); Amherst, MA
Dec 22, 2017*; 4:00 pm		Maine	W 74–63	7–6	Mullins Center (1,481); Amherst, MA
A-10 regular season
Dec 30, 2017; 2:30 pm, NBCSN		at St. Bonaventure	L 78–98	7–7 (0–1)	Reilly Center (4,945); Olean, NY
Jan 3, 2018; 7:00 pm, NESN+		George Mason	L 72–80 ^{OT}	7–8 (0–2)	Mullins Center (2,243); Amherst, MA
Jan 6, 2018; 12:00 pm, NBCSN		at Dayton	W 62–60	8–8 (1–2)	UD Arena (12,654); Dayton, OH
Jan 10, 2018; 7:00 pm, NESN+		La Salle	W 86–76 ^{OT}	9–8 (2–2)	Mullins Center (2,056); Amherst, MA
Jan 14, 2018; 5:00 pm, NBCSN		Saint Joseph's	W 72–69	10–8 (3–2)	Mullins Center (2,476); Amherst, MA
Jan 17, 2018; 7:00 pm		at Rhode Island	L 51–73	10–9 (3–3)	Ryan Center (5,583); Kingston, RI
Jan 20, 2018; 2:00 pm, Stadium		Saint Louis	L 47–66	10–10 (3–4)	Mullins Center (4,121); Amherst, MA
Jan 24, 2018; 7:00 pm		at La Salle	L 72–87	10–11 (3–5)	Tom Gola Arena (1,214); Philadelphia, PA
Jan 27, 2018; 2:00 pm, NBCSN		at Fordham	L 69–82	10–12 (3–6)	Rose Hill Gymnasium (2,234); Bronx, NY
Jan 30, 2018; 6:30 pm, CBSSN		No. 22 Rhode Island	L 83–85	10–13 (3–7)	Mullins Center (4,194); Amherst, MA
Feb 3, 2018; 2:00 pm, NBCSB		Dayton	W 86–82 ^{2OT}	11–13 (4–7)	Mullins Center (4,245); Amherst, MA
Feb 10, 2018; 4:00 pm		at Saint Joseph's	L 73–85	11–14 (4–8)	Hagan Arena (3,751); Philadelphia, PA
Feb 14, 2018; 7:00 pm, NESN+		George Washington	L 72–83	11–15 (4–9)	Mullins Center (2,641); Amherst, MA
Feb 17, 2018; 7:00 pm		at Davidson	L 78–83	11–16 (4–10)	John M. Belk Arena (4,202); Davidson, NC
Feb 21, 2018; 7:00 pm, NESN+		VCU	L 78–82	11–17 (4–11)	Mullins Center (3,322); Amherst, MA
Feb 24, 2018; 6:00 pm		at George Mason	L 76–78 ^{OT}	11–18 (4–12)	EagleBank Arena (4,228); Fairfax, VA
Feb 28, 2018; 7:00 pm		at Richmond	L 65–90	11–19 (4–13)	Robins Center (5,618); Richmond, VA
Mar 3, 2018; 8:00 pm, NESN+		Duquesne	W 85–75	12–19 (5–13)	Mullins Center (2,953); Amherst, MA
A-10 tournament
Mar 7, 2018; 6:00 pm, Stadium	(13)	vs. (12) La Salle; First round	W 69–67	13–19	Capital One Arena (5,333); Washington, D.C.
Mar 8, 2018; 2:30 pm, NBCSN	(13)	vs. (5) George Mason; Second round	L 75–80	13–20	Capital One Arena (6,483); Washington, D.C.
*Non-conference game. ^{#}Rankings from AP Poll / Coaches' Poll. (#) Tournament seedings in parentheses. All times are in Eastern.

== See also ==
- 2017–18 UMass Minutewomen basketball team
