= 2017–18 Albany Great Danes men's basketball team =

American college basketball season

2017–18 Albany Great Danes men's basketball
- Conference: America East Conference
- Record: 22–10 (10–6 America East)
- Head coach: Will Brown (17th season)
- Assistant coaches: Jon Iati; Josh Pelletier; Jared Knotts
- Home arena: SEFCU Arena

2017–18 America East Conference men's basketball standings
	Conf.				Overall
Team	W		L	PCT	W		L	PCT
Vermont	15	–	1	.938	27	–	8	.771
UMBC †	12	–	4	.750	25	–	11	.694
Hartford	11	–	5	.688	19	–	14	.576
Albany	10	–	6	.625	22	–	10	.688
Stony Brook	7	–	9	.438	13	–	19	.406
New Hampshire	6	–	10	.375	10	–	21	.323
UMass Lowell	6	–	10	.375	12	–	18	.400
Maine	3	–	13	.188	6	–	26	.188
Binghamton	2	–	14	.125	11	–	20	.355
† 2018 America East tournament winner

The 2017–18 Albany Great Danes men's basketball team represented the University at Albany, SUNY during the 2017–18 NCAA Division I men's basketball season. The Great Danes, led by 17th-year head coach Will Brown, played their home games at SEFCU Arena as members of the America East Conference. They finished the season 22–10, 10–6 in America East play to finish in fourth place. They lost to Stony Brook in the quarterfinals of the America East tournament. Despite having 22 wins, they opted to not play in a postseason tournament.

== Previous season ==
The Great Danes finished the 2016–17 season 21–14, 10–6 in America East play to finish in a tie for third place. As the No. 3 seed in the America East tournament, they defeated Hartford and Stony Brook to advance to the championship game where they lost to Vermont. They were invited to the CollegeInsider.com Postseason Tournament where they lost in the first round to Saint Peter's.

== Offseason ==
=== Departures ===
Name	Number	Pos.	Height	Weight	Year	Hometown	Reason for departure
Jamir Andrews	2	G	6'3"	205	Senior	Livermore, CA	Graduated
Mike Rowley	10	F	6'8"	230	Senior	Sydney, Australia	Graduated
Marqueese Grayson	11	G	6'2"	200	Junior	Tomball, TX	Graduate transferred to Central Oklahoma
Terrel Martin-Garcia	14	F	6'6"	240	Junior	Catford, England	Graduate transferred to Adelphi
Jarran Lands	23	F	6'7"	245	Junior	Brownsburg, IN	Graduate transferred to Tarleton State
Dallas Ennema	24	F	6'6"	210	Senior	Sheldon, IA	Graduated

=== Incoming transfers ===
Name	Number	Pos.	Height	Weight	Year	Hometown	Previous school
Ahmad Clark	2	G	6'1"	170	Sophomore	Bowie, MD	Junior college transferree from St. Petersburg College

=== 2017 incoming recruits ===
College recruiting information
Name	Hometown	School	Height	Weight	Commit date
Brent Hank; C	Port Lincoln, Australia	Trinity College	6 ft 10 in (2.08 m)	235 lb (107 kg)	Jul 26, 2016
Brent Hank; C	Recruit ratings: Scout: Rivals: (NR)				
Cameron Healy; PG	Wahroonga, Australia	Montverde Academy Prep	6 ft 3 in (1.91 m)	185 lb (84 kg)	
Cameron Healy; PG	Recruit ratings: Scout: Rivals: (NR)				
Adam Lulka; PF	Sydney, Australia	The King's School	6 ft 8 in (2.03 m)	230 lb (100 kg)	Aug 26, 2016
Adam Lulka; PF	Recruit ratings: Scout: Rivals: (NR)				
Overall recruit ranking:
Note: In many cases, Scout, Rivals, 247Sports, On3, and ESPN may conflict in their listings of height and weight.; In these cases, the average was taken. ESPN grades are on a 100-point scale.; Sources: "2017 Team Ranking". Rivals.

=== 2018 incoming recruits ===
College recruiting information (2017)
Name	Hometown	School	Height	Weight	Commit date
Anthony Rizzuto; PG	Philadelphia, PA	Northeastern High School	6 ft 3 in (1.91 m)	N/A	
Anthony Rizzuto; PG	Recruit ratings: Scout: Rivals: (65)				
Overall recruit ranking:
Note: In many cases, Scout, Rivals, 247Sports, On3, and ESPN may conflict in their listings of height and weight.; In these cases, the average was taken. ESPN grades are on a 100-point scale.; Sources: "2018 Team Ranking". Rivals.

== Preseason ==
In a poll by the conference’s nine head coaches (who were not allowed to pick their own team) at the America East media day, the Great Danes were picked to finish in second place in the America East. Juniors David Nichols and Joe Cremo were named to the preseason All-America East team.

== Roster ==
2017–18 Albany Great Danes men's basketball team
Players
Coaches

Pos.	#	Name	Height	Weight	Year	Previous school	Hometown
G	0	Xavier Cochran	6 ft 6 in (1.98 m)	195 lb (88 kg)	RS So	Huron HS; Owens CC	Ann Arbor, MI
G	1	Costa Anderson	6 ft 2 in (1.88 m)	195 lb (88 kg)	Sr	South Atlanta HS; Northern Oklahoma	Atlanta, GA
G	2	Ahmad Clark	6 ft 1 in (1.85 m)	175 lb (79 kg)	So	DeMatha Catholic HS; St. Petersburg College	Bowie, MD
F	10	Brent Hank	6 ft 10 in (2.08 m)	265 lb (120 kg)	Fr	Trinity College HS	Port Lincoln, Australia
G	11	Cameron Healy	6 ft 3 in (1.91 m)	190 lb (86 kg)	Fr	Montverde Academy	Sydney, Australia
F	12	Devonte Campbell	6 ft 6 in (1.98 m)	220 lb (100 kg)	RS Jr	Culver Academy; Missouri State–West Plains	Vaughan, ON
G	13	David Nichols	6 ft 0 in (1.83 m)	190 lb (86 kg)	Jr	Mount Carmel HS	South Holland, IL
F	14	Adam Lulka	6 ft 8 in (2.03 m)	235 lb (107 kg)	Fr	The King's School	Sydney, Australia
G	22	Nick Fruscio (W)	5 ft 10 in (1.78 m)	155 lb (70 kg)	So	Albany Academy	Albany, NY
G	24	Joe Cremo	6 ft 4 in (1.93 m)	185 lb (84 kg)	Jr	Scotia-Glenville HS	Scotia, NY
F	30	Travis Charles	6 ft 6 in (1.98 m)	235 lb (107 kg)	RS Sr	Lincoln HS; Howard	Brooklyn, NY
F	33	Matt Conway	6 ft 7 in (2.01 m)	210 lb (95 kg)	So	Pleasant Grove HS; Salt Lake CC	Chandler, AZ
F	34	Alex Foster	6 ft 8 in (2.03 m)	240 lb (109 kg)	Sr	Seton Academy; Bradley	Plainfield, IL
F	43	Greig Stire	6 ft 7 in (2.01 m)	240 lb (109 kg)	Sr	Christian Brothers Academy	Albany, NY

Head coach

- Will Brown (Dowling)

Assistant coach(es)

- Jon Iati (Albany)
- Josh Pelletier (Saint Rose)
- Jared Knotts (Albany)

Legend

- (C) Team captain
- (S) Suspended
- (I) Ineligible
- (W) Walk-on
- Injured
- Current redshirt

Roster
Last update: October 18, 2017

== Schedule and results ==
Date time, TV	Rank^{#}	Opponent^{#}	Result	Record	High points	High rebounds	High assists	Site (attendance) city, state
Exhibition
Oct 28, 2017*; 7:30 pm		at West Virginia; Charity exhibition	L 67–98		15 – Charles	8 – Stire	3 – Tied	WVU Coliseum (5,174); Morgantown, WV
Non-conference regular season
Nov 10, 2017*; 7:00 pm, ESPN3		Iona	W 69–67	1–0	18 – Nichols	12 – Stire	2 – 3 tied	SEFCU Arena (3,529); Albany, NY
Nov 13, 2017*; 7:00 pm, Stadium		at Boston University	W 88–74	2–0	20 – Nichols	7 – Foster	5 – Nichols	Case Gym (444); Boston, MA
Nov 17, 2017*; 7:00 pm, ESPN3		Yale	W 80–72	3–0	20 – Cremo	9 – Stire	4 – Tied	SEFCU Arena (2,717); Albany, NY
Nov 20, 2017*; 7:00 pm, ESPN3		SUNY Oneonta	W 102–77	4–0	19 – Nichols	6 – 3 tied	5 – Nichols	SEFCU Arena (2,225); Albany, NY
Nov 22, 2017*; 7:00 pm		at Dartmouth	W 91–73	5–0	19 – Nichols	8 – Stire	4 – Nichols	Leede Arena (420); Hanover, NH
Nov 25, 2017*; 1:00 pm, Stadium		at Holy Cross	W 78–62	6–0	30 – Cremo	7 – Campbell	6 – Nichols	Hart Center (1,735); Worcester, MA
Nov 27, 2017*; 7:00 pm, ESPN3		at Monmouth	L 73–81	6–1	19 – Cremo	9 – Tied	2 – Tied	OceanFirst Bank Center (1,557); West Long Branch, NJ
Nov 29, 2017*; 7:00 pm, ESPN3		Colgate	W 75–69	7–1	17 – Charles	10 – Charles	6 – Cremo	SEFCU Arena (2,004); Albany, NY
Dec 2, 2017*; 7:00 pm, ESPN3		Columbia	W 86–82	8–1	29 – Nichols	10 – Stire	4 – Nichols	SEFCU Arena (2,208); Albany, NY
Dec 6, 2017*; 7:00 pm, ESPN3		Bryant; Gotham Classic	W 84–68	9–1	24 – Cremo	12 – Stire	6 – Stire	SEFCU Arena (2,012); Albany, NY
Dec 9, 2017*; 7:30 pm, SNY/Spectrum TV/ESPN3		at Siena; Albany Cup/Gotham Classic	W 74–69	10–1	19 – Charles	10 – Stire	3 – Nichols	Times Union Center (9,017); Albany, NY
Dec 12, 2017*; 9:00 pm, ESPNU		at Memphis; Gotham Classic	L 58–67	10–2	16 – Cremo	11 – Stire	3 – Tied	FedExForum (4,168); Memphis, TN
Dec 16, 2017*; 7:00 pm, ESPN3		Canisius	W 68–65	11–2	24 – Charles	7 – Stire	5 – Cremo	SEFCU Arena (2,541); Albany, NY
Dec 20, 2017*; 7:00 pm, ESPNU		at Louisville; Gotham Classic	L 68–70	11–3	18 – Cremo	15 – Foster	3 – Tied	KFC Yum! Center (16,388); Louisville, KY
Dec 28, 2017*; 7:00 pm, ESPN3		Kent State	W 78–68	12–3	19 – Charles	9 – Charles	9 – Cremo	SEFCU Arena (2,579); Albany, NY
American East regular season
Jan 3, 2018; 7:00 pm, ESPN3		Hartford	L 64–72	12–4 (0–1)	23 – Cremo	10 – Stire	6 – Cremo	SEFCU Arena (2,838); Albany, NY
Jan 6, 2018; 1:00 pm, ESPN3		at New Hampshire	L 61–64	12–5 (0–2)	20 – Cremo	9 – Stire	5 – Nichols	Lundholm Gym (439); Durham, NH
Jan 10, 2018; 7:00 pm, ESPN3		Stony Brook	W 78–65	13–5 (1–2)	20 – Charles	6 – 3 tied	5 – Cremo	SEFCU Arena (2,288); Albany, NY
Jan 13, 2018; 12:00 pm, ESPN3		at Maine	W 84–66	14–5 (2–2)	22 – Cremo	8 – Stire	4 – Cremo	Cross Insurance Center (842); Bangor, ME
Jan 15, 2018; 12:00 pm, ESPN3		at Binghamton	L 66–79	14–6 (2–3)	17 – Charles	9 – Stire	5 – Campbell	Binghamton University Events Center (3,434); Vestal, NY
Jan 18, 2018; 7:00 pm, ESPN3		UMass Lowell	W 70–62	15–6 (3–3)	23 – Cremo	9 – Stire	4 – Tied	SEFCU Arena (1,752); Albany, NY
Jan 21, 2018; 2:00 pm, ESPN3		UMBC	W 83–39	16–6 (4–3)	21 – Charles	13 – Foster	7 – Cremo	SEFCU Arena (2,508); Albany, NY
Jan 24, 2018; 7:00 pm, ESPN3		at Vermont	L 50–61	16–7 (4–4)	14 – Stire	7 – Stire	1 – 3 tied	Patrick Gym (3,266); Burlington, VT
Jan 27, 2018; 7:00 pm, ESPN3		at Stony Brook	W 57–50	17–7 (5–4)	14 – 3 tied	10 – Stire	3 – Nichols	Island Federal Credit Union Arena; Stony Brook, NY
Feb 3, 2018; 7:00 pm, ESPN3		New Hampshire	W 83–74	18–7 (6–4)	31 – Cremo	7 – Campbell	6 – Nichols	SEFCU Arena (3,831); Albany, NY
Feb 8, 2018; 7:00 pm, ESPN3		Vermont	L 67–72	18–8 (6–5)	17 – Nichols	8 – Stire	9 – Cremo	SEFCU Arena (3,602); Albany, NY
Feb 11, 2018; 2:00 pm, ESPN3		at Hartford	W 69–63	19–8 (7–5)	21 – Cremo	11 – Stire	4 – Tied	Chase Arena at Reich Family Pavilion (1,525); Hartford, CT
Feb 15, 2018; 7:00 pm, ESPN3		at UMass Lowell	W 91–81	20–8 (8–5)	25 – Nichols	8 – Stire	3 – Tied	Costello Athletic Center (419); Lowell, MA
Feb 18, 2018; 7:00 pm, ESPN3		at UMBC	L 60–68	20–9 (8–6)	25 – Cremo	9 – Cremo	5 – Nichols	UMBC Event Center (1,344); Catonsville, MD
Feb 24, 2018; 7:00 pm, ESPN3		Maine	W 89–79	21–9 (9–6)	24 – Cremo	14 – Charles	4 – Tied	SEFCU Arena (2,496); Albany, NY
Feb 27, 2018; 7:00 pm, ESPN3		Binghamton	W 71–54	22–9 (10–6)	15 – Foster	12 – Stire	9 – Cremo	SEFCU Arena (2,148); Albany, NY
America East tournament
Mar 3, 2018; 7:00 pm, ESPN3	(4)	(5) Stony Brook; Quarterfinals	L 60–69	22–10	24 – Cremo	9 – Stire	6 – Nichols	SEFCU Arena (1,785); Albany, NY
*Non-conference game. ^{#}Rankings from AP poll. (#) Tournament seedings in parentheses. All times are in Eastern Time.
