= 2018 America East men's basketball tournament =

- Classification: Division I
- Season: 2017–18
- Teams: 8
- Site: Campus sites
- Champions: UMBC (2nd title)
- Winning coach: Ryan Odom (1st title)
- MVP: Jairus Lyles (UMBC)
- Attendance: 17,062
- Television: ESPN3; ESPN2

2017–18 America East Conference men's basketball standings
	Conf.				Overall
Team	W		L	PCT	W		L	PCT
Vermont	15	–	1	.938	27	–	8	.771
UMBC †	12	–	4	.750	25	–	11	.694
Hartford	11	–	5	.688	19	–	14	.576
Albany	10	–	6	.625	22	–	10	.688
Stony Brook	7	–	9	.438	13	–	19	.406
New Hampshire	6	–	10	.375	10	–	21	.323
UMass Lowell	6	–	10	.375	12	–	18	.400
Maine	3	–	13	.188	6	–	26	.188
Binghamton	2	–	14	.125	11	–	20	.355
† 2018 America East tournament winner

The 2018 America East men's basketball tournament was the postseason men's basketball tournament for the America East Conference, which was held on March 3, 6, and 10, 2018. All tournament games were played on home arenas of the higher-seeded school. UMBC defeated regular-season champion Vermont in the championship game to win the tournament and receive the conference's automatic bid to the NCAA tournament. UMBC went on to defeat Virginia to become the first 16th-seeded team to beat the No. 1 seed in one of the biggest upsets in NCAA Tournament history.

== Seeds ==
The top eight teams in the conference standings qualified for the tournament. UMass Lowell was eligible for the tournament for the first time following their four-year transition to Division I. The teams were seeded by record in conference, with a tiebreaker system to seed teams with identical conference records. Binghamton was the only team to not qualify.

Seed	School	AEC Record	Tiebreaker
1	Vermont	15–1	
2	UMBC	12–4	
3	Hartford	11–5	
4	Albany	10–6	
5	Stony Brook	7–9	
6	New Hampshire	6–10	1–1 vs. Albany
7	UMass Lowell	6–10	0–2 vs. Albany
8	Maine	3–13	
DNQ	Binghamton	2-14	

== Schedule ==
Game	Time	Matchup	Score	Television	Attendance
Quarterfinals – Saturday, March 3
1	1:00 pm	No. 7 UMass Lowell at No. 2 UMBC	77–89	ESPN3	1,518
2	4:00 pm	No. 6 New Hampshire at No. 3 Hartford	60–71	ESPN3	1,727
3	7:00 pm	No. 8 Maine at No. 1 Vermont	60–75	ESPN3	3,266
4	7:00 pm	No. 5 Stony Brook at No. 4 Albany	69–60	ESPN3	1,785
Semifinals – Tuesday, March 6
5	7:00 pm	No. 5 Stony Brook at No. 1 Vermont	51–70	ESPN3	3,266
6	7:30 pm	No. 3 Hartford at No. 2 UMBC	60–75	ESPN3	2,234
Championship – Saturday, March 10
7	11:00 am	No. 2 UMBC at No. 1 Vermont	65–62	ESPN2	3,266
Game times in ET. Rankings denote tournament seeding. All games hosted by higher-seeded team.

== Bracket and results ==
Teams are reseeded after each round with highest remaining seeds receiving home court advantage.

Quarterfinals; Saturday, March 3, 2018; ESPN3
1	Vermont	75
8	Maine	60
4	Albany	60
5	Stony Brook	69
(Pairings are reseeded after the first round)
2	UMBC	89
7	UMass Lowell	77
3	Hartford	71
6	New Hampshire	60

Semifinals; Tuesday, March 6, 2018; ESPN3
1	Vermont	70
5	Stony Brook	51
2	UMBC	75
3	Hartford	60

Championship; Saturday, March 10, 2018; ESPN2
1	Vermont	62
2	UMBC	65

== See also ==
- 2018 America East women's basketball tournament
