= 2017–18 George Washington Colonials men's basketball team =

American college basketball season

2017–18 George Washington Colonials men's basketball
- Conference: Atlantic 10 Conference
- Record: 15–18 (7–11 A-10)
- Head coach: Maurice Joseph (2nd season)
- Assistant coaches: Hajj Turner; Carmen Maciariello; Chris Holm
- Home arena: Charles E. Smith Center

2017–18 Atlantic 10 men's basketball standings
| | Conf. | | | | Overall |
| Team | W | | L | PCT | W | | L | PCT |
|---|---|---|---|---|---|---|---|---|
| Rhode Island | 15 | – | 3 | .833 | 26 | – | 8 | .765 |
| St. Bonaventure | 14 | – | 4 | .778 | 26 | – | 8 | .765 |
| Davidson † | 13 | – | 5 | .722 | 21 | – | 12 | .636 |
| Saint Joseph's | 10 | – | 8 | .556 | 16 | – | 16 | .500 |
| VCU | 9 | – | 9 | .500 | 18 | – | 15 | .545 |
| Saint Louis | 9 | – | 9 | .500 | 17 | – | 16 | .515 |
| George Mason | 9 | – | 9 | .500 | 16 | – | 17 | .485 |
| Richmond | 9 | – | 9 | .500 | 12 | – | 20 | .375 |
| Dayton | 8 | – | 10 | .444 | 14 | – | 17 | .452 |
| Duquesne | 7 | – | 11 | .389 | 16 | – | 16 | .500 |
| George Washington | 7 | – | 11 | .389 | 15 | – | 18 | .455 |
| La Salle | 7 | – | 11 | .389 | 13 | – | 19 | .406 |
| Massachusetts | 5 | – | 13 | .278 | 13 | – | 20 | .394 |
| Fordham | 4 | – | 14 | .222 | 9 | – | 22 | .290 |
† 2018 A10 Tournament winner Rankings from AP poll

The 2017–18 George Washington Colonials men's basketball team represented George Washington University during the 2017–18 NCAA Division I men's basketball season. The Colonials were led by second-year head coach Maurice Joseph. They played their home games at the Charles E. Smith Center in Washington, D.C. as members of the Atlantic 10 Conference. They finished the season 15–18, 7–11 in A-10 play to finish in a three-way tie for 10th place. They defeated Fordham in the first round of the A-10 tournament before losing to Saint Louis in the second round.

== Previous season ==
The Colonials finished the 2016–17 season with a record of 20–15, 10–8 in A-10 play to finish in sixth place. They defeated Saint Louis in the second round of the A-10 tournament before losing in the quarterfinals to Richmond. They were invited to the College Basketball Invitational where they defeated Toledo in the first round before losing in the quarterfinals to UIC.

Head coach Mike Lonergan was fired on September 17, 2016, after the school concluded a two-month investigation into alleged emotional abuse against his players. Maurice Joseph was named interim head coach on September 27.

On March 27, 2017, the school removed the interim tag and named Joseph full-time head coach.

== Offseason ==
=== Departures ===
| Name | Number | Pos. | Height | Weight | Year | Hometown | Notes |
|---|---|---|---|---|---|---|---|
| Jordan Roland | 14 | G | 6'1" | 171 | Sophomore | Syracuse, NY | Transferred to Northeastern |
| Collin Smith | 15 | C | 6'10" | 240 | Freshman | Jacksonville, FL | Transferred to Central Florida |
| Jaren Sina | 23 | G | 6'2" | 187 | RS Junior | Lake Hopatcong, NJ | Declare for 2017 NBA draft |
| Matt Hart | 30 | G | 6'1" | 182 | RS Senior | Orchard Park, NY | Walk-on; graduated |
| Collin Goss | 33 | F | 6'11" | 227 | Sophomore | Manassas, VA | Transferred to Delaware |
| Tyler Cavanaugh | 34 | F | 6'9" | 243 | RS Senior | Syracuse, NY | Graduated |
| Kevin Marfo | 40 | F | 6'9" | 245 | Freshman | Bergenfield, NJ | Transferred to Quinnipiac |

=== Incoming transfers ===
| Name | Number | Pos. | Height | Weight | Year | Hometown | Previous School |
|---|---|---|---|---|---|---|---|
| Armel Potter | 2 | G | 6'1" | 180 | Junior | Marietta, GA | Transferred from Charleston Southern. Under NCAA transfer rules, Potter will have to sit out from the 2017–18 season. Will have two years of remaining eligibility. |
| D. J. Williams | 13 | G | 6'7" | 210 | Junior | Chicago, IL | Transferred from Illinois. Under NCAA transfer rules, Williams will have to sit out from the 2017–18 season. Will have two years of remaining eligibility. |
| Luke Sasser | 21 | F | 6'5" | 240 | RS Freshman | Raleigh, NC | Transferring from Charlotte. Under NCAA transfer rules, Sasser will have to sit out from the 2017–18 season. Will have three years of remaining eligibility. Will join the team as a walk-on. |
| Bo Zeigler | 35 | F | 6'6" | 207 | RS Senior | Detroit, MI | Transferred from South Florida. Will be eligible to play immediately since Zeigler graduated from South Florida. |

=== 2017 recruiting class ===
College recruiting information
| Name | Hometown | School | Height | Weight | Commit date |
|---|---|---|---|---|---|
| Justin Mazzulla #89 PG | Warwick, RI | Bishop Hendricken High School | 6 ft 3 in (1.91 m) | N/A | Oct 26, 2016 |
| Justin Mazzulla #89 PG | Recruit ratings: Scout: 247Sports: ESPN: (62) | | | | |
| Maceo Jack; SG | Buffalo, NY | St. Thomas More School | 6 ft 4 in (1.93 m) | 190 lb (86 kg) | Jan 8, 2017 |
| Maceo Jack; SG | Recruit ratings: No ratings found | | | | |
Overall recruit ranking:
Note: In many cases, Scout, Rivals, 247Sports, On3, and ESPN may conflict in their listings of height and weight.; In these cases, the average was taken. ESPN grades are on a 100-point scale.; Sources: "George Washington 2017 Player Commits". ESPN.; "2017 Team Ranking". Rivals.

=== 2018 recruiting class ===
College recruiting information (2018)
| Name | Hometown | School | Height | Weight | Commit date |
|---|---|---|---|---|---|
| Shandon Brown #73 PG | Chestnut Hill, MA | New Hampton School | 5 ft 9 in (1.75 m) | 145 lb (66 kg) | Aug 19, 2017 |
| Shandon Brown #73 PG | Recruit ratings: 247Sports: ESPN: (64) | | | | |
| Chimezie Offurum; SF | Washington, D.C. | Georgetown Prep | 6 ft 5 in (1.96 m) | 145 lb (66 kg) | Sep 11, 2017 |
| Chimezie Offurum; SF | Recruit ratings: No ratings found | | | | |
Overall recruit ranking:
Note: In many cases, Scout, Rivals, 247Sports, On3, and ESPN may conflict in their listings of height and weight.; In these cases, the average was taken. ESPN grades are on a 100-point scale.; Sources: "George Washington 2018 Player Commits". ESPN.; "2018 Team Ranking". Rivals.

== Preseason ==
In a poll of the league's head coaches and select media members at the conference's media day, the Colonials were picked to finish in 11th place in the A-10. Yuta Watanabe was named to the conference's preseason second team.

== Roster ==
2017–18 George Washington Colonials men's basketball team
Players
Coaches

| Pos. | # | Name | Height | Weight | Year | Previous school | Hometown |
|---|---|---|---|---|---|---|---|
| G | 0 | Justin Mazzulla | 6 ft 3 in (1.91 m) | 185 lb (84 kg) | Fr | Bishop Hendricken High School | Warwick, Rhode Island |
| G | 1 | Terry Nolan Jr. | 6 ft 2 in (1.88 m) | 175 lb (79 kg) | Fr | Mount Carmel High School | Essex, Maryland |
| G | 2 | Armel Potter (redshirt) | 6 ft 1 in (1.85 m) | 180 lb (82 kg) | Jr | Sprayberry High School; Charleston Southern | Marietta, Georgia |
| G | 3 | Jair Bolden | 6 ft 4 in (1.93 m) | 205 lb (93 kg) | So | Westtown School | Brooklyn, New York |
| G | 4 | Justin Williams | 6 ft 3 in (1.91 m) | 215 lb (98 kg) | So | Annapolis Area Christian School | Severn, Maryland |
| G | 5 | Adam Mitola | 6 ft 3 in (1.91 m) | 205 lb (93 kg) | So | Gill St. Bernard's School | Florham Park, New Jersey |
| G/F | 10 | Patrick Steeves | 6 ft 7 in (2.01 m) | 232 lb (105 kg) | RS Sr | The Hotchkiss School; Harvard | Montreal, Quebec, Canada |
| F/C | 11 | Arnaldo Toro | 6 ft 9 in (2.06 m) | 245 lb (111 kg) | So | St. Benedict's Prep | Hormigueros, Puerto Rico |
| G | 12 | Yuta Watanabe | 6 ft 8 in (2.03 m) | 196 lb (89 kg) | Sr | St. Thomas More | Miki, Kagawa, Japan |
| G | 13 | D. J. Williams (redshirt) | 6 ft 7 in (2.01 m) | 200 lb (91 kg) | Jr | Simeon Academy; Illinois | Chicago, Illinois |
| G | 14 | Maceo Jack | 6 ft 5 in (1.96 m) | 190 lb (86 kg) | Fr | St. Thomas More | Buffalo, New York |
| F | 21 | Luke Sasser (W) (redshirt) | 6 ft 5 in (1.96 m) | 220 lb (100 kg) | RS Fr | Carlisle School; Charlotte | Raleigh, North Carolina |
| G | 30 | Jack Granger (W) | 5 ft 7 in (1.7 m) | 185 lb (84 kg) | Sr | Coginchaug Regional High School | Middlefield, Connecticut |
| F | 32 | Javier Langarica | 6 ft 9 in (2.06 m) | 180 lb (82 kg) | Fr | Bilbao National High School | Bilbao, Spain |
| F | 35 | Bo Zeigler | 6 ft 6 in (1.98 m) | 200 lb (91 kg) | RS Sr | Detroit Community School; South Florida | Detroit, Michigan |

Head coach

- Maurice Joseph (Vermont)

Assistant coach(es)

- Hajj Turner (Louisville)
- Carmen Maciariello (Siena)
- Chris Holm (Vermont)

Legend

- (C) Team captain
- (S) Suspended
- (I) Ineligible
- (W) Walk-on
- Injured
- Current redshirt

Roster

== Schedule and results ==
| Date time, TV | Rank^{#} | Opponent^{#} | Result | Record | High points | High rebounds | High assists | Site (attendance) city, state |
Exhibition
| Nov 4, 2017*; 2:00 pm | | Fairmont State | W 86–63 | | 21 – Tied | 11 – Tied | 3 – Toro | Charles E. Smith Center (2,287); Washington, D.C. |
Non-conference regular season
| Nov 10, 2017*; 7:30 pm | | Howard | W 84–75 | 1–0 | 19 – Watanabe | 11 – Watanabe | 6 – Nolan, Jr. | Charles E. Smith Center (3,831); Washington, D.C. |
| Nov 14, 2017*; 7:00 pm, RSN/NBCSWA+ | | at Florida State | L 67–87 | 1–1 | 18 – Tied | 8 – Watanabe | 3 – Bolden | Donald L. Tucker Center (7,455); Tallahassee, FL |
| Nov 18, 2017*; 2:00 pm | | Hampton; Las Vegas Invitational campus game | W 65–57 | 2–1 | 14 – Steeves | 7 – Toro | 5 – Bolden | Charles E. Smith Center (2,636); Washington, D.C. |
| Nov 20, 2017*; 7:00 pm | | Rider; Las Vegas Invitational campus game | L 65–67 | 2–2 | 19 – Steeves | 13 – Watanabe | 6 – Bolden | Charles E. Smith Center (2,118); Washington, D.C. |
| Nov 23, 2017*; 5:00 pm, FS1 | | vs. No. 15 Xavier; Las Vegas Invitational semifinals | L 64–83 | 2–3 | 18 – Nolan | 7 – Toro | 3 – Bolden | Orleans Arena; Paradise, NV |
| Nov 24, 2017*; 8:00 pm, FS1 | | vs. Kansas State; Las Vegas Invitational | L 59–67 | 2–4 | 21 – Toro | 9 – Toro | 4 – Bolden | Orleans Arena; Las Vegas, NV |
| Nov 29, 2017*; 7:00 pm | | Morgan State | W 73–66 | 3–4 | 26 – Watanabe | 7 – Tied | 4 – 3 tied | Charles E. Smith Center (2,018); Washington, D.C. |
| Dec 3, 2017*; 2:30 pm, MASN | | vs. Temple; BB&T Classic | W 71–67 | 4–4 | 17 – Tied | 7 – Steeves | 4 – Bolden | Capital One Arena (4,338); Washington, D.C. |
| Dec 6, 2017*; 7:00 pm | | Princeton | W 71–60 | 5–4 | 25 – Bolden | 7 – Steeves | 3 – Steeves | Charles E. Smith Center (2,004); Washington, D.C. |
| Dec 9, 2017*; 4:00 pm, BTN | | at Penn State | L 54–74 | 5–5 | 18 – Watanabe | 6 – Tied | 2 – Steeves | Bryce Jordan Center (6,652); University Park, PA |
| Dec 16, 2017*; 12:00 pm, CBSSN | | No. 6 Miami (FL) | L 50–59 | 5–6 | 13 – Bolden | 13 – Toro | 3 – Bolden | Charles E. Smith Center (3,862); Washington, D.C. |
| Dec 20, 2017*; 7:00 pm | | New Hampshire | W 68–64 | 6–6 | 23 – Steeves | 11 – Watanabe | 5 – Tied | Charles E. Smith Center (2,009); Washington, D.C. |
| Dec 23, 2017*; 12:00 pm, Stadium | | Harvard | W 58–48 | 7–6 | 19 – Steeves | 9 – Steeves | 4 – Steeves | Charles E. Smith Center (2,421); Washington, D.C. |
Atlantic 10 regular season
| Dec 30, 2017; 4:00 pm | | Saint Joseph's | W 70–64 | 8–6 (1–0) | 18 – Watanabe | 12 – Toro | 3 – 3 tied | Charles E. Smith Center (2,225); Washington, D.C. |
| Jan 3, 2018; 7:00 pm | | at Duquesne | L 52–69 | 8–7 (1–1) | 15 – Watanabe | 8 – Watanabe | 2 – Tied | Palumbo Center (1,347); Pittsburgh, PA |
| Jan 6, 2018; 4:00 pm | | Rhode Island | L 60–81 | 8–8 (1–2) | 22 – Terrell | 10 – Langevine | 9 – Dowtin | Charles E. Smith Center (2,249); Washington, D.C. |
| Jan 10, 2018; 7:00 pm | | at Davidson | L 45–72 | 8–9 (1–3) | 12 – Watanabe | 5 – Watanabe | 2 – 5 tied | John M. Belk Arena (3,310); Davidson, NC |
| Jan 13, 2018; 4:30 pm, NBCSN | | at Richmond | L 68–78 | 8–10 (1–4) | 23 – Steeves | 9 – Zeigler | 4 – Tied | Robins Center (6,727); Richmond, VA |
| Jan 17, 2018; 7:00 pm | | George Mason; Revolutionary Rivalry | W 80–68 | 9–10 (2–4) | 19 – Watanabe | 5 – Tied | 6 – Nolan Jr. | Charles E. Smith Center (2,215); Washington, D.C. |
| Jan 20, 2018; 12:30 pm, NBCSN | | at VCU | L 63–87 | 9–11 (2–5) | 19 – Watanabe | 6 – Steeves | 4 – Steeves | Siegel Center (7,637); Richmond, VA |
| Jan 28, 2018; 12:00 pm, NBCSN | | at St. Bonaventure | L 52–70 | 9–12 (2–6) | 13 – Watanabe | 7 – Steeves | 2 – Tied | Reilly Center (4,976); Olean, NY |
| Jan 31, 2018; 7:00 pm | | Duquesne | L 73–75 | 9–13 (2–7) | 23 – Steeves | 6 – Steeves | 8 – Bolden | Charles E. Smith Center (2,412); Washington, D.C. |
| Feb 3, 2018; 4:00 pm, NBCSWA | | Davidson | L 58–87 | 9–14 (2–8) | 20 – Watanabe | 5 – Nolan Jr. | 5 – Mazzulla | Charles E. Smith Center (4,018); Washington, D.C. |
| Feb 7, 2018; 7:00 pm | | La Salle | W 80–69 | 10–14 (3–8) | 29 – Watanabe | 10 – Nolan Jr. | 4 – Tied | Charles E. Smith Center (2,017); Washington, D.C. |
| Feb 10, 2018; 4:00 pm, Stadium | | at George Mason; Revolutionary Rivalry | L 65–72 | 10–15 (3–9) | 19 – Watanabe | 12 – Watanabe | 5 – Bolden | EagleBank Arena (7,032); Fairfax, VA |
| Feb 14, 2018; 7:00 pm, NESN+ | | at Massachusetts | W 83–72 | 11–15 (4–9) | 16 – Steeves | 12 – Steeves | 6 – Nolan Jr. | Mullins Center (2,641); Amherst, MA |
| Feb 17, 2018; 4:00 pm, Stadium | | VCU | W 80–56 | 12–15 (5–9) | 23 – Watanabe | 9 – Watanabe | 4 – Watanabe | Charles E. Smith Center (3,979); Washington, D.C. |
| Feb 21, 2018; 7:00 pm, Stadium | | Richmond | W 103–77 | 13–15 (6–9) | 23 – Watanabe | 10 – Toro | 10 – Mazzulla | Charles E. Smith Center (2,542); Washington, D.C. |
| Feb 24, 2018; 8:00 pm, FSMW | | at Saint Louis | L 53–62 | 13–16 (6–10) | 15 – Watanabe | 16 – Toro | 4 – Bolden | Chaifetz Arena (6,238); St. Louis, MO |
| Feb 28, 2018; 7:00 pm | | Fordham | W 72–56 | 14–16 (7–10) | 31 – Watanabe | 9 – Nolan Jr. | 6 – Nolan Jr. | Charles E. Smith Center (2,463); Washington, D.C. |
| Mar 3, 2018; 12:30 pm, NBCSN | | at Dayton | L 78–88 | 14–17 (7–11) | 21 – Watanabe | 10 – Toro | 4 – Bolden | UD Arena (13,350); Dayton, OH |
Atlantic 10 tournament
| Mar 7, 2018; 8:30 pm, Stadium | (11) | vs. (14) Fordham; First round | W 78–72 | 15–17 | 22 – Bolden | 15 – Toro | 7 – Mazzulla | Capital One Arena (5,333); Washington, D.C. |
| Mar 8, 2018; 8:30 pm, NBCSN | (11) | vs. (6) Saint Louis; Second round | L 63–70 | 15–18 | 16 – Bolden | 9 – toro | 4 – Bolden | Capital One Arena (6,514); Washington, D.C. |
*Non-conference game. ^{#}Rankings from AP Poll. (#) Tournament seedings in parentheses. All times are in Eastern Time.

== See also ==
- 2017–18 George Washington Colonials women's basketball team
