= 2017–18 Hartford Hawks men's basketball team =

American college basketball season

2017–18 Hartford Hawks men's basketball

CIT, First round
- Conference: America East Conference
- Record: 19–14 (11–5 America East)
- Head coach: John Gallagher (8th season)
- Assistant coaches: Tom Devitt; John Linehan; Matt Mihalich
- Home arena: Chase Arena at Reich Family Pavilion

2017–18 America East Conference men's basketball standings
	Conf.				Overall
Team	W		L	PCT	W		L	PCT
Vermont	15	–	1	.938	27	–	8	.771
UMBC †	12	–	4	.750	25	–	11	.694
Hartford	11	–	5	.688	19	–	14	.576
Albany	10	–	6	.625	22	–	10	.688
Stony Brook	7	–	9	.438	13	–	19	.406
New Hampshire	6	–	10	.375	10	–	21	.323
UMass Lowell	6	–	10	.375	12	–	18	.400
Maine	3	–	13	.188	6	–	26	.188
Binghamton	2	–	14	.125	11	–	20	.355
† 2018 America East tournament winner

The 2017–18 Hartford Hawks men's basketball team represented the University of Hartford during the 2017–18 NCAA Division I men's basketball season. The Hawks, led by eighth-year head coach John Gallagher, played their home games at the Chase Arena at Reich Family Pavilion as members of the America East Conference.They finished the season 19–14, 11–5 in America East play, to finish in third place. They defeated New Hampshire in the quarterfinals of the America East tournament before losing to UMBC in the semifinals. They received an invitation to the CollegeInsider.com Tournament where they lost in the first round to San Diego.

== Previous season ==
The Hawks finished the season 9–22, 4–12 in America East play to finish in seventh place. They lost in the quarterfinals of the America East tournament to Albany.

== Offseason ==
=== Departures ===
Name	Number	Pos.	Height	Weight	Year	Hometown	Reason for departure
TreVaughn Wilkerson	0	F	6'7"	205	Sophomore	Philadelphia, PA	Transferred to Lincoln (PA)
Jalen Ross	3	G	6'0"	185	RS Senior	Greenbelt, MD	Graduated
Jake Fay	55	G	6'6"	205	RS Junior	Lynn, MA	Graduate transferred to Virgin Islands

=== 2017 incoming recruits ===
College recruiting information
Name	Hometown	School	Height	Weight	Commit date
Petr Stepanyants; PF	Moscow, Russia	Balboa City School	6 ft 9 in (2.06 m)	220 lb (100 kg)	
Petr Stepanyants; PF	Recruit ratings: Scout: Rivals:				
Jalen Knight; PG	Charlotte, NC	United Faith Christian Academy	6 ft 0 in (1.83 m)	N/A	10/Mar 2016
Jalen Knight; PG	Recruit ratings: Scout: Rivals: (NR)				
Branislav Terzic; SG	Belgrade, Serbia	BC Slodes	6 ft 5 in (1.96 m)	N/A	
Branislav Terzic; SG	Recruit ratings: Scout: Rivals: (NR)				
Overall recruit ranking:
Note: In many cases, Scout, Rivals, 247Sports, On3, and ESPN may conflict in their listings of height and weight.; In these cases, the average was taken. ESPN grades are on a 100-point scale.; Sources: "2017 Team Ranking". Rivals.

== Roster ==
2017–18 Hartford Hawks men's basketball team
Players
Coaches

Pos.	#	Name	Height	Weight	Year	Previous school	Hometown
F	0	Ziga Habat	6 ft 4 in (1.93 m)	185 lb (84 kg)	Fr	Gymnazia Siska	Ljubljana, Slovenia
G	3	Jalen Knight	6 ft 0 in (1.83 m)	175 lb (79 kg)	Fr	United Faith	Charlotte, NC
F	4	George Blagojevic	6 ft 8 in (2.03 m)	220 lb (100 kg)	Jr	Australian Institute of Sport	Geelong, Australia
F	5	John Carroll	6 ft 8 in (2.03 m)	220 lb (100 kg)	RS Jr	IMG Academy/The Hill School	Dublin, Ireland
F	10	Nikola Colovic	6 ft 10 in (2.08 m)	225 lb (102 kg)	RS Fr	None	Belgrade, Serbia
G	11	Andrew Ramirez	6 ft 2 in (1.88 m)	185 lb (84 kg)	Jr	Diego Velazquez; Western Nebraska CC	Madrid, Spain
G	12	Jason Dunne	6 ft 4 in (1.93 m)	185 lb (84 kg)	Jr	Matawan Regional HS	Matawan, NJ
G	13	J. R. Lynch	5 ft 10 in (1.78 m)	170 lb (77 kg)	Jr	Hudson Catholic HS/St. Andrew's	Hoboken, NJ
F	15	Jack Hobbs	6 ft 7 in (2.01 m)	195 lb (88 kg)	Sr	South Anchorage HS/Impact Basketball	Anchorage, AK
G	20	Max Twyman	6 ft 5 in (1.96 m)	200 lb (91 kg)	RS So	Rye HS	Rye, NY
G/F	22	Travis Weatherington	6 ft 2 in (1.88 m)	215 lb (98 kg)	Jr	Royal Palm Beach HS/Palm Beach State	Palm Beach, FL
G/F	33	Mark Plousis (W)	6 ft 5 in (1.96 m)	185 lb (84 kg)	Sr	Cardinal O'Hara HS	Havertown, PA
F	34	Branislav Terzic	6 ft 5 in (1.96 m)	185 lb (84 kg)	Fr	Williston Northampton School	Belgrade, Serbia
C	44	Hassan Attia	6 ft 10 in (2.08 m)	270 lb (122 kg)	Sr	Colby CC	Alexandria, Egypt
F	45	Petr Stepanyants	6 ft 9 in (2.06 m)	220 lb (100 kg)	Fr	The Balboa School	Moscow, Russia

Head coach

- John Gallagher (Saint Joseph's)

Assistant coach(es)

- Tom Devitt (Boston College)
- John Linehan (Providence)
- Matt Mihalich (John Carroll)

Legend

- (C) Team captain
- (S) Suspended
- (I) Ineligible
- (W) Walk-on
- Injured
- Current redshirt

Roster
Last update: July 14, 2024

== Schedule and results ==
Date time, TV	Rank^{#}	Opponent^{#}	Result	Record	Site (attendance) city, state
Non-conference regular season
November 10, 2017*; 8:00 p.m., ESPN3		Central Connecticut; Rivalry	W 85–84 ^{OT}	1–0	Chase Arena at Reich Family Pavilion (2,216); Hartford, CT
November 12, 2017*; 4:00 p.m., ESPN3		Gordon; Jamaica Classic	W 80–63	2–0	Chase Arena at Reich Family Pavilion (729); Hartford, CT
November 15, 2017*; 7:00 p.m.		at Rider	L 53–89	2–1	Alumni Gymnasium (1,223); Lawrenceville, NJ
November 18, 2017*; 5:30 p.m., CBSSN		vs. LIU Brooklyn; Jamaica Classic	L 84–86	2–2	Montego Bay Convention Center (1,018); Montego Bay, Jamaica
November 19, 2017*; 10:00 p.m., CBSSN		vs. Miami (OH); Jamaica Classic	W 68–58	3–2	Montego Bay Convention Center (1,951); Montego Bay, Jamaica
November 24, 2017*; 3:00 p.m., ESPN3		Bryant	L 73–78	3–3	Chase Arena at Reich Family Pavilion (951); Hartford, CT
November 26, 2017*; 2:00 p.m., ESPN3		Wagner	L 73–78	3–4	Chase Arena at Reich Family Pavilion (951); Hartford, CT
November 30, 2017*; 7:00 p.m.		at LIU Brooklyn	L 78–79	3–5	Steinberg Wellness Center (1,782); Brooklyn, NY
December 2, 2017*; 7:00 p.m., ESPN3		Boston College	L 61–73	3–6	Chase Arena at Reich Family Pavilion (3,438); Hartford, CT
December 7, 2017*; 7:00 p.m., ESPN3		Quinnipiac	W 77–75	4–6	Chase Arena at Reich Family Pavilion (1,019); Hartford, CT
December 11, 2017*; 7:00 p.m., ESPN3		Sacred Heart	W 86–72	5–6	Chase Arena at Reich Family Pavilion (1,182); Hartford, CT
December 19, 2017*; 10:00 p.m.		at Portland	L 67–78	5–7	Chiles Center (1,191); Portland, OR
December 22, 2017*; 7:00 p.m.		at FIU	W 79–72	6–7	FIU Arena (497); Miami, FL
December 28, 2017*; 7:00 p.m., BTN+		at Rutgers	W 60–58	7–7	Louis Brown Athletic Center (4,632); Piscataway, NJ
America East regular season
January 3, 2018; 7:00 p.m., ESPN3		at Albany	W 72–64	8–7 (1–0)	SEFCU Arena (2,838); Albany, NY
January 6, 2018; 7:00 p.m., ESPN3		Stony Brook	L 61–63	8–8 (1–1)	Chase Arena at Reich Family Pavilion (1,073); Hartford, CT
January 10, 2018; 7:00 p.m., ESPN3		UMass Lowell	W 84–73	9–8 (2–1)	Chase Arena at Reich Family Pavilion (705); Hartford, CT
January 13, 2018; 2:00 p.m., ESPN3		Binghamton	W 97–65	10–8 (3–1)	Chase Arena at Reich Family Pavilion (1,505); Hartford, CT
January 15, 2018; 1:00 p.m., ESPN3		at UMBC	L 56–78	10–9 (3–2)	Retriever Activities Center (744); Catonsville, MD
January 18, 2018; 7:00 p.m., ESPN3		at Maine	W 86–68	11–9 (4–2)	Cross Insurance Center (903); Bangor, ME
January 21, 2018; 1:00 p.m., ESPN3		Vermont	L 53–76	11–10 (4–3)	Chase Arena at Reich Family Pavilion (1,784); Hartford, CT
January 27, 2018; 5:00 p.m., ESPN3		at UMass Lowell	W 77–70	12–10 (5–3)	Tsongas Center (2,867); Lowell, MA
January 31, 2018; 7:00 p.m., ESPN3		at New Hampshire	W 79–62	13–10 (6–3)	Lundholm Gym (547); Durham, NH
February 3, 2018; 7:00 p.m., ESPN3		at Stony Brook	W 73–64	14–10 (7–3)	Island Federal Credit Union Arena (3,494); Stony Brook, NY
February 11, 2018; 2:00 p.m., ESPN3		Albany	L 63–69	14–11 (7–4)	Chase Arena at Reich Family Pavilion (1,525); Hartford, CT
February 15, 2018; 7:00 p.m., ESPN3		Maine	W 67–63	15–11 (8–4)	Chase Arena at Reich Family Pavilion (914); Hartford, CT
February 18, 2018; 2:00 p.m., ESPN3		at Vermont	W 69–68	16–11 (9–4)	Patrick Gym (3,168); Burlington, VT
February 21, 2018; 7:00 p.m., ESPN3		New Hampshire	W 65–56	17–11 (10–4)	Chase Arena at Reich Family Pavilion (1,002); Hartford, CT
February 24, 2018; 4:00 p.m., ESPN3		at Binghamton	W 67–57	18–11 (11–4)	Binghamton University Events Center (3,714); Vestal, NY
February 27, 2018; 7:00 p.m., ESPN3		UMBC	L 53–62	18–12 (11–5)	Chase Arena at Reich Family Pavilion (2,036); Hartford, CT
America East tournament
March 3, 2018; 4:00 p.m., ESPN3	(3)	(6) New Hampshire; Quarterfinals	W 71–60	19–12	Chase Arena at Reich Family Pavilion (1,727); Hartford, CT
March 6, 2018; 7:30 p.m., ESPN3	(3)	(2) UMBC; Semifinals	L 60–75	19–13	Retriever Activities Center (2,234); Catonsville, MD
CIT
March 12, 2018*; 10:00 p.m., CBSSN		at San Diego; First round – Riley Wallace Classic	L 72–88	19–14	Jenny Craig Pavilion (893); San Diego, CA
*Non-conference game. ^{#}Rankings from AP poll. (#) Tournament seedings in parentheses. All times are in Eastern.
