= 2017–18 Stony Brook Seawolves men's basketball team =

American college basketball season

2017–18 Stony Brook Seawolves men's basketball
- Conference: America East Conference
- Record: 13–19 (7–9 America East)
- Head coach: Jeff Boals (2nd season)
- Assistant coaches: Geno Ford; Bryan Weber; Lamar Thornton
- Home arena: Island Federal Credit Union Arena

2017–18 America East Conference men's basketball standings
	Conf.				Overall
Team	W		L	PCT	W		L	PCT
Vermont	15	–	1	.938	27	–	8	.771
UMBC †	12	–	4	.750	25	–	11	.694
Hartford	11	–	5	.688	19	–	14	.576
Albany	10	–	6	.625	22	–	10	.688
Stony Brook	7	–	9	.438	13	–	19	.406
New Hampshire	6	–	10	.375	10	–	21	.323
UMass Lowell	6	–	10	.375	12	–	18	.400
Maine	3	–	13	.188	6	–	26	.188
Binghamton	2	–	14	.125	11	–	20	.355
† 2018 America East tournament winner

The 2017–18 Stony Brook Seawolves men's basketball team represented Stony Brook University in the 2017–18 NCAA Division I men's basketball season. The Seawolves were led by second-year head coach Jeff Boals and played their home games at Island Federal Credit Union Arena in Stony Brook, New York as members of the America East Conference. They finished season 13–19, 7–9 in America East play to finish in fifth place. They defeated Albany in the quarterfinals of the America East tournament before losing in the semifinals to Vermont. Freshman forward Elijah Olaniyi won the 2018 America East Rookie of the Year award, averaging 7.5 points and 3.8 rebounds in his debut season.

== Previous season ==
The Seawolves finished the 2016–17 season 18–14, 12–4 in America East play to finish in second place. As the No. 2 seed in the America East tournament, they defeated Binghamton before losing to Albany in the semifinals. They were invited to the College Basketball Invitational where they lost in the first round to UIC.

== Offseason ==
=== Departures ===
Name	Number	Pos.	Height	Weight	Year	Hometown	Reason for departure
Kameron Mitchell	3	G	6'4"	195	RS Senior	Jacksonville, FL	Graduated
Blair Mendy	10	G	6'3"	190	Sophomore	San Jose, CA	Walk-on; left the team for personal reasons
Roland Nyama	24	G/F	6'6"	210	RS Junior	Frankfurt, Germany	Signed to play professionally in Germany with PS Karlsruhe
Lucas Woodhouse	34	G	6'3"	180	RS Senior	Greenlawn, NY	Graduated
Alonzo Campbell	42	F/C	7'0"	230	RS Freshman	Columbus, OH	Transferred to Paris JC

=== 2017 recruiting class ===
College recruiting information
Name	Hometown	School	Height	Weight	Commit date
Elijah Olaniyi #75 SF	Newark, NJ	East Side High School	6 ft 4 in (1.93 m)	190 lb (86 kg)	
Elijah Olaniyi #75 SF	Recruit ratings: Scout: Rivals: (67)				
Corry Long; PG	Cincinnati, OH	Hughes High School	6 ft 2 in (1.88 m)	160 lb (73 kg)	Sep 9, 2016
Corry Long; PG	Recruit ratings: Scout: Rivals: (NR)				
Jordan McKenzie; PG	Concord, NC	Hargrave Military Academy	6 ft 1 in (1.85 m)	180 lb (82 kg)	Sep 20, 2016
Jordan McKenzie; PG	Recruit ratings: Scout: Rivals: (NR)				
Anthony Ochefu; PF	West Chester, PA	Westtown School	6 ft 8 in (2.03 m)	N/A	Jul 7, 2016
Anthony Ochefu; PF	Recruit ratings: Scout: Rivals: (NR)				
Overall recruit ranking:
Note: In many cases, Scout, Rivals, 247Sports, On3, and ESPN may conflict in their listings of height and weight.; In these cases, the average was taken. ESPN grades are on a 100-point scale.; Sources: "2017 Team Ranking". Rivals.

=== 2018 recruiting class ===
College recruiting information (2018)
Name	Hometown	School	Height	Weight	Commit date
Myles Latimer #84 PG	Fairfax, VA	Paul VI High School	6 ft 3 in (1.91 m)	175 lb (79 kg)	Jul 10, 2017
Myles Latimer #84 PG	Recruit ratings: Scout: Rivals: (61)				
Hassan Ceesay; PG	Newark, NJ	East Side High School	6 ft 2 in (1.88 m)	150 lb (68 kg)	
Hassan Ceesay; PG	Recruit ratings: Scout: Rivals: (0)				
Overall recruit ranking:
Note: In many cases, Scout, Rivals, 247Sports, On3, and ESPN may conflict in their listings of height and weight.; In these cases, the average was taken. ESPN grades are on a 100-point scale.; Sources: "2018 Team Ranking". Rivals.

== Preseason ==
In a poll by the conference's nine head coaches (who were not allowed to pick their own team) at the America East media day, the Seawolves were picked to finish in fourth place in the America East.

== Roster ==
2017–18 Stony Brook Seawolves men's basketball team
Players
Coaches

Pos.	#	Name	Height	Weight	Year	Previous school	Hometown
G	0	Jaron Cornish	5 ft 11 in (1.8 m)	172 lb (78 kg)	Jr	Champagnat Catholic School; Broward College	Abaco, Bahamas
G	1	UC Iroegbu	6 ft 0 in (1.83 m)	182 lb (83 kg)	Sr	Capital Christian HS; College of Southern Idaho	Sacramento, CA
G	2	Michael Almonacy	6 ft 1 in (1.85 m)	180 lb (82 kg)	So	Brentwood HS	Brentwood, NY
F	3	Elijah Olaniyi	6 ft 5 in (1.96 m)	200 lb (91 kg)	Fr	East Side HS	Newark, NJ
G	4	Tim Donohoe (W)	6 ft 3 in (1.91 m)	190 lb (86 kg)	Sr	The Albany Academy	Saratoga Springs, NY
G	5	Corry Long	6 ft 2 in (1.88 m)	165 lb (75 kg)	Fr	Hughes STEM HS	Cincinnati, OH
G	10	Jordan McKenzie	6 ft 1 in (1.85 m)	190 lb (86 kg)	Fr	Jay M. Robinson HS/Hargrave Military Academy	Concord, NC
G/F	11	Junior Saintel	6 ft 7 in (2.01 m)	210 lb (95 kg)	Sr	Holy Spirit HS; Chipola College	Mays Landing, NJ
F	12	Tyrell Sturdivant	6 ft 7 in (2.01 m)	232 lb (105 kg)	Sr	Chester HS	Chester, PA
G/F	15	Akwasi Yeboah	6 ft 6 in (1.98 m)	235 lb (107 kg)	RS So	Barking Abbey School	Chigwell, England
G/F	22	Bryan Sekunda	6 ft 6 in (1.98 m)	190 lb (86 kg)	Sr	State College Area HS	State College, PA
G/F	23	Andrew Garcia	6 ft 5 in (1.96 m)	227 lb (103 kg)	RS Fr	The Master's School (CT)	Harlem, NY
F	32	Jakub Petras	6 ft 11 in (2.11 m)	272 lb (123 kg)	Sr	Canarias Basketball Academy	Rajec, Slovakia
F	35	Anthony Ochefu	6 ft 8 in (2.03 m)	245 lb (111 kg)	Fr	Westtown School	West Chester, PA

Head coach

- Jeff Boals (Ohio)

Assistant coach(es)

- Geno Ford (Ohio)
- Bryan Weber (Akron)
- Lamar Thornton (Ohio Dominican)

Legend

- (C) Team captain
- (S) Suspended
- (I) Ineligible
- (W) Walk-on
- Injured
- Current redshirt

Roster
Last update: October 19, 2017

== Schedule and results ==
Date time, TV	Rank^{#}	Opponent^{#}	Result	Record	Site (attendance) city, state
Non-conference regular season
Nov 10, 2017*; 7:00 pm, BTN+		vs. Maryland; Long Island Hoops Showcase	L 61–76	0–1	Nassau Coliseum (3,066); Uniondale, NY
Nov 14, 2017*; 7:00 pm, SNY		at UConn; Phil Knight Invitational	L 64–72	0–2	XL Center (5,431); Hartford, CT
Nov 17, 2017*; 7:00 pm, ESPN3		at Ball State; Phil Knight Invitational	L 76–87	0–3	Worthen Arena (3,502); Muncie, IN
Nov 19, 2017*; 4:00 pm, BTN		at No. 2 Michigan State; Phil Knight Invitational	L 71–93	0–4	Breslin Center (14,797); East Lansing, MI
Nov 22, 2017*; 7:00 pm, ESPN3		Brown	W 77–64	1–4	Island Federal Credit Union Arena (2,340); Stony Brook, NY
Nov 26, 2017*; 2:00 pm		Bucknell; Phil Knight Invitational	L 76–85	1–5	Island Federal Credit Union Arena (2,367); Stony Brook, NY
Nov 29, 2017*; 7:00 pm		Shawnee State	W 101–58	2–5	Island Federal Credit Union Arena (2,123); Stony Brook, NY
Dec 2, 2017*; 7:00 pm		Saint Francis (PA)	W 85–83	3–5	Island Federal Credit Union Arena (2,123); Stony Brook, NY
Dec 4, 2017*; 7:00 pm		at LIU Brooklyn	L 71–75	3–6	Steinberg Wellness Center (953); Brooklyn, NY
Dec 7, 2017*; 7:00 pm		at Columbia	W 76–66	4–6	Levien Gymnasium (1,231); New York City, NY
Dec 12, 2017*; 7:00 pm		Hofstra	L 81–84	4–7	Island Federal Credit Union Arena (2,735); Stony Brook, NY
Dec 17, 2017*; 2:30 pm, FS1		at Providence	L 60–62	4–8	Dunkin' Donuts Center (5,742); Providence, RI
Dec 22, 2017*; 7:00 pm, BTN+		at Rutgers	W 75–73	5–8	Louis Brown Athletic Center (4,675); Piscataway, NJ
Dec 30, 2017*; 7:00 pm		Norfolk State	L 68–74	5–9	Island Federal Credit Union Arena (2,912); Stony Brook, NY
America East regular season
Jan 3, 2018; 7:00 pm, ESPN3		Maine	W 71–70	6–9 (1–0)	Island Federal Credit Union Arena (2,262); Stony Brook, NY
Jan 6, 2018; 7:00 pm, ESPN3		at Hartford	W 63–61	7–9 (2–0)	Chase Arena at Reich Family Pavilion (1,073); Hartford, CT
Jan 10, 2018; 7:00 pm, ESPN3		at Albany	L 65–78	7–10 (2–1)	SEFCU Arena (2,288); Albany, NY
Jan 13, 2018; 2:00 pm, ESPN3		at Vermont	L 62–73	7–11 (2–2)	Patrick Gym (3,266); Burlington, VT
Jan 18, 2018; 7:00 pm, ESPN3		Binghamton	W 77–66	8–11 (3–2)	Island Federal Credit Union Arena (2,387); Stony Brook, NY
Jan 21, 2018; 1:00 pm, ESPN3		at New Hampshire	L 51–53	8–12 (3–3)	Lundholm Gym (429); Durham, NH
Jan 24, 2018; 1:00 pm, ESPN3		at UMass Lowell	L 79–82 ^{OT}	8–13 (3–4)	Costello Athletic Center (602); Lowell, MA
Jan 27, 2018; 7:00 pm, ESPN3		Albany	L 50–57	8–14 (3–5)	Island Federal Credit Union Arena (4,009); Stony Brook, NY
Jan 31, 2018; 7:00 pm, ESPN3		UMBC	L 63–67	8–15 (3–6)	Island Federal Credit Union Arena (2,379); Stony Brook, NY
Feb 3, 2018; 7:00 pm, ESPN3		Hartford	L 64–73	8–16 (3–7)	Island Federal Credit Union Arena (3,494); Stony Brook, NY
Feb 8, 2018; 7:00 pm, ESPN3		UMass Lowell	W 81–68	9–16 (4–7)	Island Federal Credit Union Arena (2,388); Stony Brook, NY
Feb 11, 2018; 2:00 pm, ESPN3		at Maine	W 64–61	10–16 (5–7)	Cross Insurance Center (1,153); Bangor, ME
Feb 15, 2018; 7:00 pm, ESPN3		at Binghamton	L 57–69	10–17 (5–8)	Binghamton University Events Center (1,967); Vestal, NY
Feb 18, 2018; 2:00 pm, ESPN3		New Hampshire	W 72–63	11–17 (6–8)	Island Federal Credit Union Arena (3,067); Stony Brook, NY
Feb 21, 2018; 7:00 pm, ESPN3		at UMBC	W 64–57	12–17 (7–8)	UMBC Event Center (1,002); Catonsville, MD
Feb 24, 2018; 7:00 pm, ESPN3		Vermont	L 60–69	12–18 (7–9)	Island Federal Credit Union Arena (3,528); Stony Brook, NY
America East tournament
Mar 3, 2018; 7:00 pm, ESPN3	(5)	at (4) Albany; Quarterfinals	W 69–60	13–18	SEFCU Arena (1,785); Albany, NY
Mar 6, 2018; 7:00 pm, ESPN3	(5)	at (1) Vermont; Semifinals	L 51–70	13–19	Patrick Gym (3,266); Burlington, VT
*Non-conference game. ^{#}Rankings from AP Poll. (#) Tournament seedings in parentheses. All times are in Eastern Time.
