= 2017–18 New Hampshire Wildcats men's basketball team =

American college basketball season

2017–18 New Hampshire Wildcats men's basketball
- Conference: America East Conference
- Record: 10–21 (6–10 America East)
- Head coach: Bill Herrion (13th season)
- Assistant coaches: Kenneth Dempsey; Chris Mohr; Josh King
- Home arena: Lundholm Gym

2017–18 America East Conference men's basketball standings
	Conf.				Overall
Team	W		L	PCT	W		L	PCT
Vermont	15	–	1	.938	27	–	8	.771
UMBC †	12	–	4	.750	25	–	11	.694
Hartford	11	–	5	.688	19	–	14	.576
Albany	10	–	6	.625	22	–	10	.688
Stony Brook	7	–	9	.438	13	–	19	.406
New Hampshire	6	–	10	.375	10	–	21	.323
UMass Lowell	6	–	10	.375	12	–	18	.400
Maine	3	–	13	.188	6	–	26	.188
Binghamton	2	–	14	.125	11	–	20	.355
† 2018 America East tournament winner

The 2017–18 New Hampshire Wildcats men's basketball team represented the University of New Hampshire during the 2017–18 NCAA Division I men's basketball season. The Wildcats, led by 13th-year head coach Bill Herrion, played their home games at Lundholm Gym in Durham, New Hampshire as members of the America East Conference. They finished the season 10–21, 6–10 in America East play to finish in a tie for six place. They lost to Hartford in the quarterfinals of the America East tournament.

== Previous season ==
The Wildcats finished the season 20–12, 10–6 in America East play to finish in a tie for third place. As the No. 4 seed in the America East tournament, they defeated UMBC in the quarterfinals before losing to Vermont in the semifinals.

== Offseason ==
=== Departures ===
Name	Number	Pos.	Height	Weight	Year	Hometown	Reason for departure
Jaleen Smith	0	G	6'4"	205	Senior	Freeport, TX	Graduated
Daniel Dion	5	G	6'0"	175	Senior	Cedar Park, TX	Graduated
Joe Bramanti	30	G	6'2"	205	RS Senior	Andover, MA	Graduated

=== Incoming transfers ===
Name	Number	Pos.	Height	Weight	Year	Hometown	Previous school
Mark Carbone	5	G	6'2"	180	Sophomore	Wethersfield, CT	Transferred from San Diego. Under NCAA transfer rules, Carbone will have to sit out from the 2017–18 season. Will have three years of remaining eligibility.

=== 2017 recruiting class ===
College recruiting information
Name	Hometown	School	Height	Weight	Commit date
Joshua Hopkins; SF	Greensboro, NC	Dudley High School	6 ft 6 in (1.98 m)	N/A	Oct 17, 2016
Joshua Hopkins; SF	Recruit ratings: Scout: Rivals: (NR)				
Elijah Jordan; PG	Orlando, FL	The First Academy	6 ft 2 in (1.88 m)	175 lb (79 kg)	Nov 6, 2016
Elijah Jordan; PG	Recruit ratings: Scout: Rivals: (NR)				
Overall recruit ranking:
Note: In many cases, Scout, Rivals, 247Sports, On3, and ESPN may conflict in their listings of height and weight.; In these cases, the average was taken. ESPN grades are on a 100-point scale.; Sources: "2017 Team Ranking". Rivals.

== Roster ==
2017–18 New Hampshire Wildcats men's basketball team
Players
Coaches

Pos.	#	Name	Height	Weight	Year	Previous school	Hometown
G	0	Kijana Love	6 ft 1 in (1.85 m)	170 lb (77 kg)	So	Steele HS	Cibolo, TX
G	2	Darryl Stewart	6 ft 1 in (1.85 m)	185 lb (84 kg)	RS Jr	Holy Innocents; Tyler JC	Atlanta, GA
F	3	Jacoby Armstrong	6 ft 7 in (2.01 m)	230 lb (104 kg)	RS Sr	Wylie HS	Dallas, TX
G	4	Keon Burns (W)	6 ft 4 in (1.93 m)	205 lb (93 kg)	RS Sr	Westview/Phillips Exeter Academy	Beaverton, OR
G	5	Mark Carbone (redshirt)	6 ft 2 in (1.88 m)	180 lb (82 kg)	So	East Catholic HS; San Diego	Wethersfield, CT
G	10	John Ogwuche	6 ft 1 in (1.85 m)	190 lb (86 kg)	So	Greenforst McCalep	Makurdi, Nigeria
G	11	Jordan Reed	6 ft 0 in (1.83 m)	190 lb (86 kg)	RS Jr	Lovejoy HS; Rice	Lucas, TX
F	12	Iba Camara	6 ft 9 in (2.06 m)	230 lb (104 kg)	Sr	Admiral Farragut Academy/St. Paul's School	Dakar, Senegal
G	13	Elijah Jordan	6 ft 1 in (1.85 m)	—	Fr	First Academy	Orland, FL
G	15	Josh Hopkins	6 ft 5 in (1.96 m)	—	Fr	James B. Dudley HS	Greensboro, NC
F	21	Tanner Leissner	6 ft 7 in (2.01 m)	230 lb (104 kg)	Sr	Judson HS	Converse, TX
F	22	David Watkins	6 ft 8 in (2.03 m)	225 lb (102 kg)	Jr	Brimmer and May School	Dorchester, MA
F	23	Chris Lester	6 ft 6 in (1.98 m)	225 lb (102 kg)	So	Barrington HS	Barrington, IL
F	32	Ken Uhlar (W)	6 ft 6 in (1.98 m)	215 lb (98 kg)	RS So	Walpole HS	Walpole, MA
F	44	Luke Rosinkski	6 ft 8 in (2.03 m)	235 lb (107 kg)	So	Kimball Union Academy	Derry, NH

Head coach

- Bill Herrion (Merrimack)

Assistant coach(es)

- Kenneth Dempsey (Moravian)
- Chris Mohr (Merrimack)
- Josh King (Eckerd)

Legend

- (C) Team captain
- (S) Suspended
- (I) Ineligible
- (W) Walk-on
- Injured
- Current redshirt

Roster
Last update: October 19, 2017

== Schedule and results ==
Date time, TV	Rank^{#}	Opponent^{#}	Result	Record	Site (attendance) city, state
Non-conference regular season
Nov 10, 2017*; 1:00 pm, ESPN3		Wheelock	W 95–39	1–0	Lundholm Gym (349); Durham, NH
Nov 14, 2017*; 8:00 pm, LHN		at Texas; Phil Knight Invitational	L 60–78	1–1	Frank Erwin Center (8,465); Austin, TX
Nov 19, 2017*; 6:00 pm, SECN		at No. 8 Florida; Phil Knight Invitational	L 63–70	1–2	O'Connell Center (9,501); Gainesville, FL
Nov 21, 2017*; 7:00 pm, ESPN3		American	L 70–74	1–3	Lundholm Gym (474); Durham, NH
Nov 24, 2017*; 1:00 pm		vs. Furman; Phil Knight Invitational sub-regional	L 64–78	1–4	Nashville Municipal Auditorium (400); Nashville, TN
Nov 26, 2017*; 1:00 pm		vs. Utah State; Phil Knight Invitational sub-regional	L 64–78	1–5	Nashville Municipal Auditorium (400); Nashville, TN
Nov 29, 2017*; 7:00 pm, ESPN3		Boston University	L 69–70	1–6	Lundholm Gym (317); Durham, NH
Dec 2, 2017*; 1:00 pm, ESPN3		Bryant	W 75–59	2–6	Lundholm Gym (369); Durham, NH
Dec 5, 2017*; 7:00 pm, ESPN3		Niagara	L 70–78	2–7	Lundholm Gym (519); Durham, NH
Dec 9, 2017*; 3:00 pm		at Holy Cross	L 58–62	2–8	Hart Center (1,275); Worcester, MA
Dec 16, 2017*; 7:00 pm		Lyndon State	W 111–31	3–8	Lundholm Gym (279); Durham, NH
Dec 20, 2017*; 7:00 pm		at George Washington	L 64–68	3–9	Charles E. Smith Center (2,009); Washington, D.C.
Dec 22, 2017*; 7:00 pm, Facebook Live		at Fairfield	L 68–78	3–10	Webster Bank Arena (923); Bridgeport, CT
Dec 30, 2017*; 7:00 pm		Dartmouth; Rivalry	W 83–66	4–10	Lundholm Gym (511); Durham, NH
America East regular season
Jan 3, 2018; 7:00 pm, ESPN3		at UMBC	W 71–67	4–11 (0–1)	Retriever Activities Center (518); Catonsville, MD
Jan 6, 2018; 1:00 pm, ESPN3		Albany	W 64–61	5–11 (1–1)	Lundholm Gym (439); Durham, NH
Jan 10, 2018; 7:00 pm, ESPN3		Binghamton	W 71–67	6–11 (2–1)	Lundholm Gym (414); Durham, NH
Jan 15, 2018; 2:30 pm, ESPN3		at UMass Lowell	W 74–62	7–11 (3–1)	Tsongas Center (2,033); Lowell, MA
Jan 18, 2018; 7:00 pm, ESPN3		Vermont	L 56–67	7–12 (3–2)	Lundholm Gym (560); Durham, NH
Jan 21, 2018; 1:00 pm, ESPN3		Stony Brook	W 53–51	8–12 (4–2)	Lundholm Gym (429); Durham, NH
Jan 24, 2018; 7:00 pm, ESPN3		at Maine	L 68–69	8–13 (4–3)	Cross Insurance Center (1,103); Bangor, ME
Jan 27, 2018; 4:00 pm, ESPN3		at Binghamton	W 57–52	9–13 (5–3)	Binghamton University Events Center (2,643); Vestal, NY
Jan 31, 2018; 7:00 pm, ESPN3		Hartford	L 62–79	9–14 (5–4)	Lundholm Gym (547); Durham, NH
Feb 3, 2018; 7:00 pm, ESPN3		at Albany	L 74–83	9–15 (5–5)	SEFCU Arena (3,831); Albany, NY
Feb 8, 2018; 7:00 pm, ESPN3		Maine	W 71–56	10–15 (6–5)	Lundholm Gym (522); Durham, NH
Feb 11, 2018; 1:00 pm, ESPN3		UMBC	L 59–68	10–16 (6–6)	Lundholm Gym (839); Durham, NH
Feb 15, 2018; 7:00 pm, ESPN3		at Vermont	L 58–71	10–17 (6–7)	Patrick Gym (2,633); Burlington, VT
Feb 18, 2018; 2:00 pm, ESPN3		at Stony Brook	L 63–72	10–18 (6–8)	Island Federal Credit Union Arena (3,067); Stony Brook, NY
Feb 21, 2018; 7:00 pm, ESPN3		at Hartford	L 56–65	10–19 (6–9)	Chase Arena at Reich Family Pavilion (1,002); Hartford, CT
Feb 27, 2018; 7:00 pm, ESPN3		UMass Lowell	L 77–92	10–20 (6–10)	Lundholm Gym (651); Durham, NH
America East tournament
Mar 3, 2018; 4:00 pm, ESPN3	(6)	at (3) Hartford; Quarterfinals	L 60–71	10–21	Chase Arena at Reich Family Pavilion (1,727); Hartford, CT
*Non-conference game. ^{#}Rankings from AP Poll. (#) Tournament seedings in parentheses. All times are in Eastern Time.
