= 2017–18 UMass Lowell River Hawks men's basketball team =

American college basketball season

2017–18 UMass Lowell River Hawks men's basketball
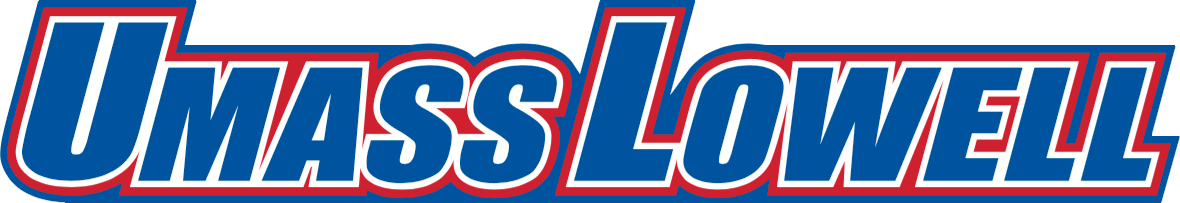
- Conference: America East Conference
- Record: 12–18 (6–10 America East)
- Head coach: Pat Duquette (5th season)
- Assistant coaches: Biko Paris; Nick Leonardelli; Louis Hinnant
- Home arena: Costello Athletic Center; Tsongas Center

2017–18 America East Conference men's basketball standings
	Conf.				Overall
Team	W		L	PCT	W		L	PCT
Vermont	15	–	1	.938	27	–	8	.771
UMBC †	12	–	4	.750	25	–	11	.694
Hartford	11	–	5	.688	19	–	14	.576
Albany	10	–	6	.625	22	–	10	.688
Stony Brook	7	–	9	.438	13	–	19	.406
New Hampshire	6	–	10	.375	10	–	21	.323
UMass Lowell	6	–	10	.375	12	–	18	.400
Maine	3	–	13	.188	6	–	26	.188
Binghamton	2	–	14	.125	11	–	20	.355
† 2018 America East tournament winner

The 2017–18 UMass Lowell River Hawks men's basketball team represented the University of Massachusetts Lowell during the 2017–18 NCAA Division I men's basketball season. The River Hawks, led by fifth-year head coach Pat Duquette, played most of their home games at Costello Athletic Center, with six home games at the Tsongas Center. They were members of the America East Conference.

The season marked the River Hawks' first full season as a Division I school after a four-year transition period from Division II to Division I. Accordingly, they were eligible for postseason play including the America East tournament. They finished the season 12–18, 6–10 in America East play to finish in a tie for sixth place. They lost in the quarterfinals of the America East tournament to UMBC.

== Previous season ==
The River Hawks finished the 2016–17 season 11–20, 5–11 in American East play to finish in sixth place. UMass Lowell was in the fourth and final year of a transition to Division I and, thus, ineligible for the postseason, including the America East tournament.

== Offseason ==
=== Departures ===
Name	Number	Pos.	Height	Weight	Year	Hometown	Reason for departure
Isaac White	11	G	6'0"	178	Sophomore	Ashland, OH	Transferred to Nova Southeastern
Jordan Shea	21	G	6'4"	195	RS sophomore	Madison, WI	Transferred to Assumption
Logan Primerano	23	G/F	6'4"	180	Sophomore	Peru, IN	Transferred to Goshen College
Tyler Livingston	24	F	6'6"	215	Senior	Hudson, NH	Graduated

=== Incoming transfers ===
Name	Number	Pos.	Height	Weight	Year	Hometown	Previous school
Christian Lutete	23	F	6'4"	190	Junior	Silver Spring, MD	Transferred from Radford. Under NCAA transfer rules, Lutete had to sit out from the 2017–18 season. Had two years of remaining eligibility.

=== 2017 incoming recruits ===
College recruiting
Name	Hometown	School	Height	Weight	Commit date
Joey Naccarato; SG	Coeur D'Alene, ID	Coeur D'Alene High School	6 ft 4 in (1.93 m)	225 lb (102 kg)	Oct 7, 2016
Joey Naccarato; SG	Recruit ratings: Scout: Rivals: (NR)				
Overall recruit ranking:
Note: In many cases, Scout, Rivals, 247Sports, On3, and ESPN may conflict in their listings of height and weight.; In these cases, the average was taken. ESPN grades are on a 100-point scale.; Sources: "2017 Team Ranking". Rivals.

=== 2018 incoming recruits ===
College recruiting (2018)
Name	Hometown	School	Height	Weight	Commit date
Alex Rivera #79 SG	Lowell, MA	Lowell High School	5 ft 11 in (1.80 m)	N/A	
Alex Rivera #79 SG	Recruit ratings: Scout: Rivals: (59)				
Bryce Daley #88 PG	Salisbury, CT	Salisbury School	6 ft 2 in (1.88 m)	N/A	
Bryce Daley #88 PG	Recruit ratings: Scout: Rivals: (55)				
Overall recruit ranking:
Note: In many cases, Scout, Rivals, 247Sports, On3, and ESPN may conflict in their listings of height and weight.; In these cases, the average was taken. ESPN grades are on a 100-point scale.; Sources: "2017 Team Ranking". Rivals.

== Preseason ==
In a poll by the conference’s nine head coaches (who were not allowed to pick their own team) at the America East media day, the River Hawks were picked to finish in a tie for sixth place in the America East. Senior Jahad Thomas, Sr. was named to the preseason All-America East team.

== Roster ==
2017–18 UMass Lowell River Hawks men's basketball team
Players
Coaches

Pos.	#	Name	Height	Weight	Year	Previous school	Hometown
G	0	Shawn Jones	6 ft 0 in (1.83 m)	180 lb (82 kg)	Jr	L.W. Higgins HS; Howard	Bridge City, LA
G	1	Rinardo Perry	6 ft 4 in (1.93 m)	190 lb (86 kg)	So	McKinley Tech HS	Washington, D.C.
G/F	3	Stefan Borovac	6 ft 8 in (2.03 m)	210 lb (95 kg)	So	Orchard Park HS	Stoney Creek, OH
G	5	Ryan Jones	6 ft 3 in (1.91 m)	185 lb (84 kg)	Jr	Cleveland HS	Rio Rancho, NM
G/F	10	Jahad Thomas	6 ft 2 in (1.88 m)	210 lb (95 kg)	RS Sr	Williamsport HS	Williamsport, PA
G	11	Obadiah Noel	6 ft 4 in (1.93 m)	185 lb (84 kg)	Fr	Tuscarora HS	Frederick, MD
G/F	12	Josh Gantz	6 ft 7 in (2.01 m)	225 lb (102 kg)	RS Jr	Bishop Ready HS	Grove City, OH
G	22	Matt Harris	6 ft 1 in (1.85 m)	195 lb (88 kg)	Sr	Cathedral Prep	Erie, PA
F	23	Christian Lutete (I) (redshirt)	6 ft 5 in (1.96 m)	195 lb (88 kg)	Jr	Phillips Exeter Academy; Radford	Silver Spring, MD
G	24	Joey Naccarato	6 ft 4 in (1.93 m)	215 lb (98 kg)	Fr	Coeur d'Alene HS	Coeur d'Alene, ID
F	25	Dontavious Smith	6 ft 8 in (2.03 m)	200 lb (91 kg)	RS Jr	North Webster High School	Cullen, LA
F	35	Connor Bennett	6 ft 10 in (2.08 m)	235 lb (107 kg)	RS So	Wilmington HS	Wilmington, MA
F	44	Cameron Wolter	6 ft 8 in (2.03 m)	225 lb (102 kg)	So	Fishers HS	Fishers, IN

Head coach

- Pat Duquette (Williams)

Assistant coach(es)

- Biko Paris (Boston College)
- Nick Leonardelli (Dickinson)
- Louis Hinnant (Boston College)

Legend

- (C) Team captain
- (S) Suspended
- (I) Ineligible
- (W) Walk-on
- Injured
- Current redshirt

Roster
Last update: October 20, 2017

== Schedule and results ==
Date time, TV	Rank^{#}	Opponent^{#}	Result	Record	Site (attendance) city, state
Non-conference regular season
Nov 10, 2017*; 7:00 pm		at Massachusetts	L 69–74	0–1	Mullins Center (3,857); Amherst, MA
Nov 12, 2017*; 1:00 pm, ESPN3		UMass Boston	W 102–63	1–1	Costello Athletic Center (387); Lowell, MA
Nov 15, 2017*; 7:30 pm, ESPN3		Marist	W 76–73	2–1	Costello Athletic Center (718); Lowell, MA
Nov 19, 2017*; 1:00 pm, ESPN3		Cornell	W 98–78	3–1	Tsongas Center (1,689); Lowell, MA
Nov 22, 2017*; 3:00 pm, ESPN3		LIU Brooklyn	W 74–66	4–1	Costello Athletic Center (407); Lowell, MA
Nov 26, 2017*; 2:00 pm, ESPN3		Loyola (MD)	W 83–75	5–1	Costello Athletic Center (463); Lowell, MA
Nov 29, 2017*; 7:00 pm, ESPN3		Sacred Heart	L 80–87	5–2	Costello Athletic Center (994); Lowell, MA
Dec 3, 2017*; 2:00 pm, ESPN3		at NJIT	L 65–78	5–3	Wellness and Events Center; Newark, NJ
Dec 5, 2017*; 7:00 pm		at Wagner	L 72–90	5–4	Spiro Sports Center (917); Staten Island, NY
Dec 9, 2017*; 2:00 pm		at Brown	L 75–89	5–5	Pizzitola Sports Center (330); Providence, RI
Dec 13, 2017*; 5:00 pm, ESPN3		Boston University	W 87–82	6–5	Costello Athletic Center (1,475); Lowell, MA
Dec 23, 2017*; 1:00 pm, ESPN3		Central Connecticut	L 73–76	6–6	Tsongas Center (1,566); Lowell, MA
Dec 30, 2017*; 3:00 pm, BTN		at Wisconsin	L 53–82	6–7	Kohl Center (17,287); Madison, WI
America East regular season
Jan 4, 2018; 7:00 pm, ESPN3		Vermont	L 77–88	6–8 (0–1)	Costello Athletic Center (289); Lowell, MA
Jan 10, 2018; 7:00 pm, ESPN3		at Hartford	L 73–84	6–9 (0–2)	Chase Arena at Reich Family Pavilion (705); Hartford, CT
Jan 13, 2018; 12:00 pm, ESPN3		UMBC	L 62–89	6–10 (0–3)	Tsongas Center (1,338); Lowell, MA
Jan 15, 2018; 2:30 pm, ESPN3		New Hampshire	L 62–74	6–11 (0–4)	Tsongas Center (2,033); Lowell, MA
Jan 18, 2018; 7:00 pm, ESPN3		at Albany	L 62–70	6–12 (0–5)	SEFCU Arena (1,752); Albany, NY
Jan 21, 2018; 2:00 pm, ESPN3		at Binghamton	W 79–71	7–12 (1–5)	Binghamton University Events Center (2,076); Vestal, NY
Jan 24, 2018; 7:00 pm, ESPN3		Stony Brook	W 82–79 ^{OT}	8–12 (2–5)	Costello Athletic Center (602); Lowell, MA
Jan 27, 2018; 5:00 pm, ESPN3		Hartford	L 70–77	8–13 (2–6)	Tsongas Center (2,867); Lowell, MA
Jan 31, 2018; 7:00 pm, ESPN3		at Maine	W 88–64	9–13 (3–6)	Cross Insurance Center (1,506); Bangor, ME
Feb 8, 2018; 7:00 pm, ESPN3		at Stony Brook	L 68–81	9–14 (3–7)	Island Federal Credit Union Arena (2,388); Stony Brook, NY
Feb 11, 2018; 2:00 pm, ESPN3		at Vermont	L 69–81	9–15 (3–8)	Patrick Gym (2,910); Burlington, VT
Feb 15, 2018; 7:00 pm, ESPN3		Albany	L 81–91	9–16 (3–9)	Costello Athletic Center (419); Lowell, MA
Feb 18, 2018; 2:00 pm, ESPN3		Binghamton	W 74–69	10–16 (4–9)	Costello Athletic Center (562); Lowell, MA
Feb 21, 2018; 7:00 pm, ESPN3		Maine	W 88–76	11–16 (5–9)	Tsongas Center (2,214); Lowell, MA
Feb 24, 2018; 1:00 pm, ESPN3		at UMBC	L 75–83	11–17 (5–10)	UMBC Event Center (1,253); Catonsville, MD
Feb 27, 2018; 7:00 pm, ESPN3		at New Hampshire	W 92–77	12–17 (6–10)	Lundholm Gym (651); Durham, NH
America East tournament
Mar 3, 2018; 1:00 pm, ESPN3	(7)	at (2) UMBC; Quarterfinals	L 77–89	12–18	UMBC Event Center (1,518); Catonsville, MD
*Non-conference game. ^{#}Rankings from AP Poll. (#) Tournament seedings in parentheses. All times are in Eastern Time.
