= Saint Louis Billikens men's basketball statistical leaders =

The Saint Louis Billikens men's basketball statistical leaders are individual statistical leaders of the Saint Louis Billikens men's basketball program in various categories, including points, three-pointers, assists, blocks, rebounds, and steals. Within those areas, the lists identify single-game, single-season, and career leaders. The Billikens represent Saint Louis University in the NCAA's Atlantic 10 Conference.

Saint Louis began competing in intercollegiate basketball in 1915. However, the school's record book does not generally list records from before the 1950s, as records from before this period are often incomplete and inconsistent. Since scoring was much lower in this era, and teams played much fewer games during a typical season, it is likely that few or no players from this era would appear on these lists anyway.

The NCAA did not officially record assists as a stat until the 1983–84 season, and blocks and steals until the 1985–86 season, but Saint Louis record books includes players in these stats before these seasons. These lists are updated through the end of the 2020–21 season.

== Scoring ==
Career
Rk	Player	Points	Seasons
1	Gibson Jimerson	2,428	2019–20 2020–21 2021–22 2022–23 2023–24 2024–25
2	Anthony Bonner	1,972	1986–87 1987–88 1988–89 1989–90
3	Erwin Claggett	1,910	1991–92 1992–93 1993–94 1994–95
4	Roland Gray	1,880	1985–86 1986–87 1987–88 1988–89
5	Monroe Douglass	1,877	1985–86 1986–87 1987–88 1988–89
6	Scott Highmark	1,703	1991–92 1992–93 1993–94 1994–95
7	Kevin Lisch	1,691	2005–06 2006–07 2007–08 2008–09
8	Kwamain Mitchell	1,575	2008–09 2009–10 2011–12 2012–13
9	Tommie Liddell III	1,547	2005–06 2006–07 2007–08 2008–09
10	Dwayne Evans	1,499	2010–11 2011–12 2012–13 2013–14

Season
Rk	Player	Points	Season
1	Larry Hughes	670	1997–98
2	Anthony Bonner	654	1989–90
3	Harry Rogers	638	1972–73
4	Jim Irving	603	1970–71
	Gibson Jimerson	603	2024–25
6	Justin Love	602	1999–00
7	David Burns	579	1980–81
8	Roland Gray	575	1986–87
9	Anthony Bonner	573	1988–89
10	Joe Wiley	572	1969–70

Single game
Rk	Player	Points	Season	Opponent
1	Anthony Bonner	45	1989–90	Loyola (Ill.)
2	Harry Rogers	43	1972–73	West Texas St
3	Larry Hughes	40	1997–98	Marquette
4	Tramaine Isabell	39	2018–19	Duquesne
	Pete McCaffrey	39	1958–59	Wichita State
6	Dick Boushka	38	1953–54	Alabama
7	Larry Hughes	37	1997–98	UAB
	Bob Cole	37	1965–66	No. Texas St
9	Luther Burden	36	1984–85	Butler
	Isaiah Singletary	36	1981–82	Butler
	David Burns	36	1980–81	Memphis St
	David Burns	36	1979–80	Cincinnati
	Ricky Frazier	36	1978–79	UMSL
	Dick Boushka	36	1952–53	Wichita State
	Jim McLaughlin	36	1955–56	Wichita State

== Rebounds ==
Career
Rk	Player	Rebounds	Seasons
1	Anthony Bonner	1,424	1986–87 1987–88 1988–89 1989–90
2	Jerry Koch	1,258	1951–52 1952–53 1953–54 1954–55
3	Jim McLaughlin	1,128	1953–54 1954–55 1955–56
4	Jordan Goodwin	998	2017–18 2018–19 2019–20 2020–21
5	Hasahn French	982	2017–18 2018–19 2019–20 2020–21
6	Dwayne Evans	942	2010–11 2011–12 2012–13 2013–14
7	Roland Gray	811	1985–86 1986–87 1987–88 1988–89
8	Eugene Moore	790	1965–66 1966–67 1967–68
9	Joe Wiley	746	1967–68 1968–69 1969–70
10	Tommie Liddell III	740	2005–06 2006–07 2007–08 2008–09
	Carl Johnson	740	1974–75 1975–76 1976–77 1977–78

Season
Rk	Player	Rebounds	Season
1	Jerry Koch	502	1953–54
2	Jim McLaughlin	461	1954–55
3	Anthony Bonner	456	1989–90
4	Jim McLaughlin	455	1955–56
5	Cal Burnett	416	1956–57
6	Jerry Koch	405	1952–53
7	Bob Nordmann	393	1959–60
8	Anthony Bonner	386	1988–89
9	Bob Ferry	364	1958–59
10	Dick Boushka	350	1954–55

Single game
Rk	Player	Rebounds	Season	Opponent
1	Jerry Koch	38	1953–54	Bradley
2	Bob Nordmann	27	1959–60	Kansas
3	Hasahn French	24	2019–20	Belmont
	Rich Parks	24	1965–66	Arkansas State
5	Rich Parks	23	1966–67	Loyola
6	Eugene Moore	22	1965–66	Wichita State
	Bob Cole	22	1965–66	Washington U.
8	Anthony Bonner	21	1989–90	Colorado
	Anthony Bonner	21	1989–90	Illinois State
10	Francis Okoro	20	2022–23	La Salle
	Anthony Bonner	20	1989–90	Loyola (Ill.)
	Anthony Bonner	20	1988–89	Bradley
	Carl Johnson	20	1977–78	UW-Milwaukee
	Mike Lockette	20	1969–70	St. Peter's
	Rich Niemann	20	1966–67	Quincy
	Bob Nordmann	20	1959–60	Wichita State
	Bob Nordmann	20	1959–60	Wichita State

== Assists ==
Career
Rk	Player	Assists	Seasons
1	Yuri Collins	878	2019–20 2020–21 2021–22 2022–23
2	Josh Fisher	436	2000–01 2001–02 2002–03 2003–04
3	Charles Newberry	424	1987–88 1988–89 1989–90
4	Jordair Jett	422	2010–11 2011–12 2012–13 2013–14
5	Kwamain Mitchell	420	2008–09 2009–10 2011–12 2012–13
6	Jordan Goodwin	404	2017–18 2018–19 2019–20 2020–21
7	LaTodd Johnson	400	1979–80 1980–81 1981–82 1982–83
8	Darryl Lenard	370	1983–84 1984–85 1985–86
9	Jim Roder	353	1985–86 1986–87
10	Jamall Walker	350	1996–97 1997–98 1998–99

Season
Rk	Player	Assists	Season
1	Yuri Collins	324	2022–23
2	Yuri Collins	267	2021–22
3	Jim Roder	235	1986–87
4	Charles Newberry	193	1989–90
5	Yuri Collins	171	2019–20
6	Jordair Jett	164	2013–14
7	LaTodd Johnson	153	1981–82
8	H Waldman	150	1993–94
	Jeff Luechtefeld	150	1990–91
10	H Waldman	145	1994–95

Single game
Rk	Player	Assists	Season	Opponent
1	Yuri Collins	20	2022–23	Tennessee State
2	Yuri Collins	19	2021–22	Boston College
3	Jim Roder	18	1986–87	Southern Miss
4	Yuri Collins	17	2022–23	Richmond
5	Yuri Collins	15	2022–23	Paul Quinn
	Yuri Collins	15	2022–23	Saint Joseph's
7	LaTodd Johnson	14	1981–82	Georgia State
	Yuri Collins	14	2022–23	Murray State
	Yuri Collins	14	2022–23	Southern Illinois
	Yuri Collins	14	2022–23	St. Bonaventure

== Steals ==
Career
Rk	Player	Steals	Seasons
1	Jordan Goodwin	225	2017–18 2018–19 2019–20 2020–21
2	Anthony Bonner	192	1986–87 1987–88 1988–89 1989–90
3	Josh Fisher	179	2000–01 2001–02 2002–03 2003–04
4	Yuri Collins	176	2019–20 2020–21 2021–22 2022–23
5	Jordair Jett	174	2010–11 2011–12 2012–13 2013–14
6	Kwamain Mitchell	172	2008–09 2009–10 2011–12 2012–13
7	Mike McCall Jr.	165	2010–11 2011–12 2012–13 2013–14
8	Anthony Drejaj	148	2002–03 2003–04 2004–05 2005–06
9	Erwin Claggett	145	1991–92 1992–93 1993–94 1994–95
10	Kevin Lisch	133	2005–06 2006–07 2007–08 2008–09

Season
Rk	Player	Steals	Season
1	H Waldman	74	1994–95
2	Anthony Bonner	70	1989–90
3	Larry Hughes	69	1997–98
	Jeff Luechtefeld	69	1990–91
5	Jordan Goodwin	66	2018–19
6	Yuri Collins	65	2021–22
7	Jordan Goodwin	64	2019–20
8	LaTodd Johnson	59	1980–81
9	Anthony Bonner	58	1988–89
10	Charles Newberry	55	1989–90

Single game
Rk	Player	Steals	Season	Opponent
1	Everne Carr	9	1978–79	UMSL
2	Larry Hughes	8	1997–98	Tulane
	Darryl Lenard	8	1983–84	Indiana State
4	H Waldman	7	1994–95	So. Illinois

== Blocks ==
Career
Rk	Player	Blocks	Seasons
1	Hasahn French	226	2017–18 2018–19 2019–20 2020–21
2	Ian Vouyoukas	135	2003–04 2004–05 2005–06 2006–07
3	Melvin Robinson	127	1989–90 1990–91 1991–92
4	Cory Remekun	113	2009–10 2010–11 2011–12 2012–13
	Willie Reed	113	2008–09 2009–10
6	Kelvin Henderson	110	1978–79 1979–80
7	Abdur Rahiim Al Matiim	90	1983–84 1984–85
8	Rob Loe	88	2010–11 2011–12 2012–13 2013–14
	Francis Okoro	88	2021–22 2022–23
10	Matt Baniak	87	1997–98 1998–99 1999–00 2000–01

Season
Rk	Player	Blocks	Season
1	Hasahn French	77	2019–20
2	Willie Reed	73	2009–10
3	Kelvin Henderson	68	1979–80
4	Hasahn French	66	2018–19
	Melvin Robinson	66	1990–91
6	Hasahn French	59	2017–18
7	Ian Vouyoukas	57	2006–07
8	Ian Vouyoukas	55	2005–06
9	Melvin Robinson	51	1989–90
10	Abdur Rahiim Al Matiim	46	1984–85
	Francis Okoro	46	2022–23

Single game
Rk	Player	Blocks	Season	Opponent
1	Kelvin Henderson	8	1979–80	Siena
2	Hasahn French	7	2019–20	Belmont
	Willie Reed	7	2008–09	Dayton
4	Abdur Rahiim Al Matiim	6	1984–85	Oklahoma City
	Melvin Robinson	6	1989–90	Eastern Illinois
	Cory Remekun	6	2009–10	Belmont
	Elliott Welmer	6	2016–17	SIUE
	Hasahn French	6	2018–19	Pitt
9	Max Pikaar	5	2024–25	William Woods
	Willie Reed	5	2009–10	Kennesaw State
	Willie Reed	5	2008–09	Charlotte
	Ian Vouyoukas	5	2006–07	Mississippi
	Ian Vouyoukas	5	2005–06	Xavier
	Ian Vouyoukas	5	2005–06	Chicago State
	Abdur Rahiim Al Matiim	5	1983–84	William Penn
	Darryl Anderson	5	1980–81	Dayton
	Kelvin Henderson	5	1979–80	Florida State
	Kelvin Henderson	5	1979–80	Louisville
	Kelvin Henderson	5	1978–79	Memphis State
