= H Waldman =

American basketball player (born 1972)

H Waldman אייץ' ולדמן
Personal information
- Born: January 21, 1972 (age 54) Las Vegas, Nevada, U.S.
- Listed height: 6 ft 3 in (1.91 m)
- Listed weight: 200 lb (91 kg)

Career information
- High school: Clark (Las Vegas, Nevada)
- College: UNLV (1990–1992); Saint Louis (1993–1995)
- NBA draft: 1995: undrafted
- Position: Point guard / shooting guard

H Waldman (Hebrew: אייץ' ולדמן; nickname: H; born January 21, 1972) is an American-Israeli former basketball player. He played the point guard and shooting guard positions. Waldman played in the Israel Basketball Premier League from 1996 to 2001.

== Early life ==
Waldman was born in Las Vegas, Nevada, and is Jewish. His father, an attorney, is Herb Waldman, and his mother is Sharon Waldman. He is 6 ft 3 in (1.91 m) tall, and weighs 200 pounds (91 kg).

== Basketball career ==
He played basketball in Las Vegas at Clark High School for the Stars. He was the Nevada high school basketball player of the year in 1990, as he scored 17.4 points per game and had 8.3 assists per game. In December 1999, Sports Illustrated named him one of the top 50 Nevada sports figures in the 20th century.

Waldman then attended and played basketball for two seasons for the University of Nevada-Las Vegas. He holds UNLV's record for three-point percentage in one season, as he shot .523 (23 of 44) in 1991–92.

He played two seasons at Saint Louis University (Finance; '95), for the Saint Louis Billikens. For them, in 1993–94 Waldman was second in the Great Midwest Conference in assists (150), and fifth in steals (51), and in 1994–95 he was second in the conference in steals (74), and third in assists (145). He received the 1995 Carl O. Bauer Award from the Missouri Athletic Club as the top amateur sports figure in the St. Louis area.

Waldman played in the Israel Basketball Premier League from 1996 to 2001 for Hapoel Jerusalem and Maccabi Ra'anana. He said he did not encounter much of a language barrier in Israel, because “everyone spoke English.”

He ultimately became a partner in a Las Vegas business. Waldman partnered with Bob Schiffman in 2012 to create National Technology Associates, which designs and engineers audio-visual technology.

== See also ==
- Saint Louis Billikens men's basketball statistical leaders
