= Jordan Goodwin =

American basketball player (born 1998)

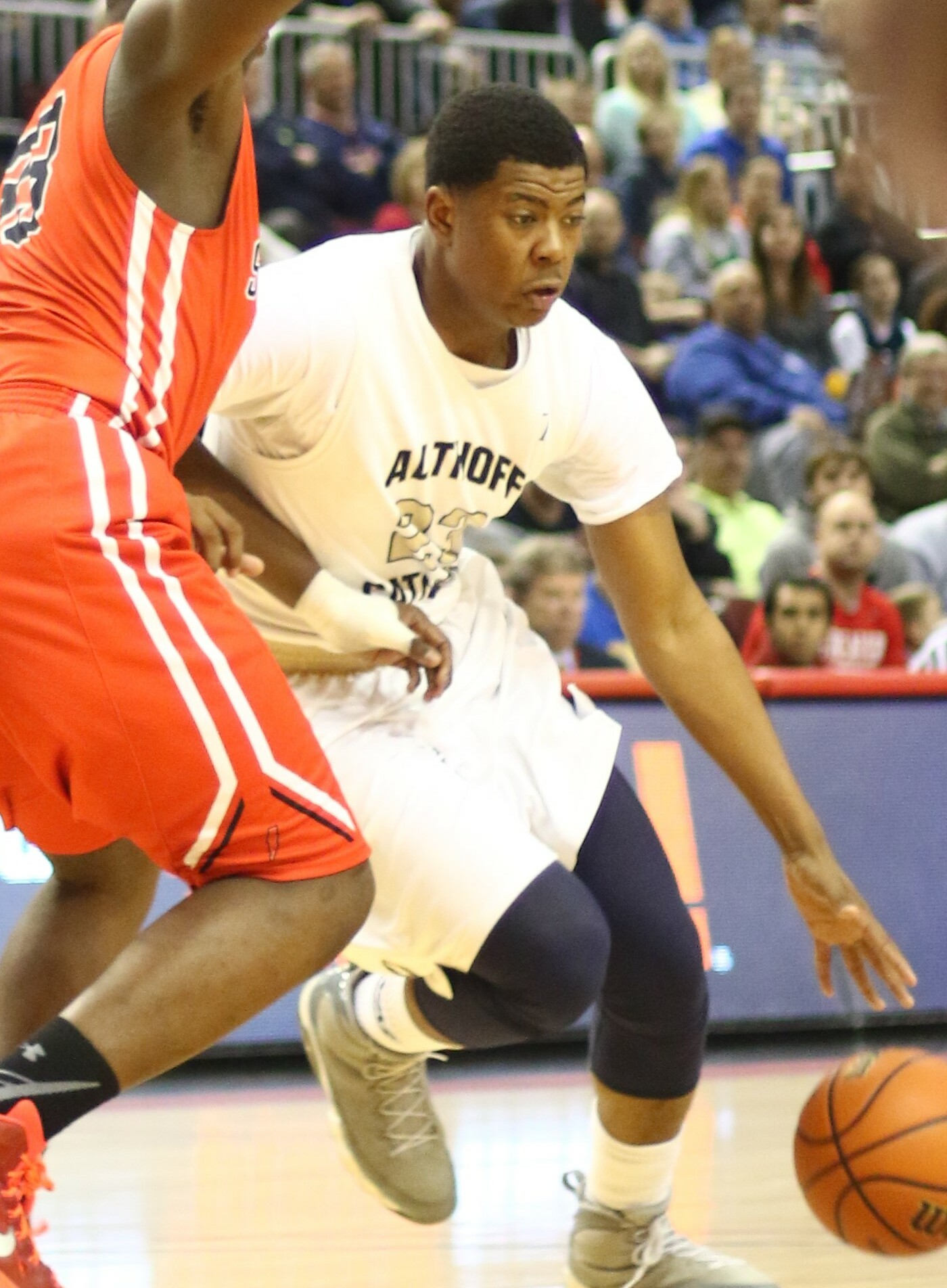
- Goodwin in the 2015 IHSA Class 3A Championship game

No. 23 – Phoenix Suns
- Position: Shooting guard / point guard
- League: NBA

Personal information
- Born: October 23, 1998 (age 28) Centreville, Illinois, U.S.
- Listed height: 6 ft 3 in (1.91 m)
- Listed weight: 215 lb (98 kg)

Career information
- High school: Althoff Catholic (Belleville, Illinois)
- College: Saint Louis (2017–2021)
- NBA draft: 2021: undrafted
- Playing career: 2021–present

Career history
- 2021–2023: Capital City Go-Go
- 2021–2023: Washington Wizards
- 2023: →Capital City Go-Go
- 2023–2024: Phoenix Suns
- 2024: Memphis Grizzlies
- 2024: →Memphis Hustle
- 2024–2025: South Bay Lakers
- 2025: Los Angeles Lakers
- 2025–present: Phoenix Suns

Career highlights
- 2× First-team All-Atlantic 10 (2020, 2021); 2× Atlantic 10 All-Defensive Team (2020, 2021)
- Stats at NBA.com
- Stats at Basketball Reference

Jordan Goodwin (born October 23, 1998) is an American professional basketball player for the Phoenix Suns of the National Basketball Association (NBA). He played college basketball for the Saint Louis Billikens.

== High school career ==
Goodwin attended Althoff Catholic High School in Belleville, Illinois. As a junior, he averaged 19 points, nine rebounds and 3.2 assists, leading his team to a 32–2 record and the Class 3A state title. He repeated as the Belleville News-Democrat Class 3A-4A Player of the Year. On January 24, 2017, Goodwin posted 26 points and 10 rebounds in a 74–64 win over Mount Vernon High School, passing Kevin Lisch as Althoff's all-time leading scorer. After the game, he underwent season-ending surgery for a partially torn labrum in his left shoulder, which had been occasionally bothering him for two years. Goodwin played for the St. Louis Eagles on the Amateur Athletic Union circuit and had success at the Nike Elite Youth Basketball League. A consensus four-star recruit, he committed to playing college basketball for Saint Louis over offers from Alabama, Butler, Creighton, Illinois, Missouri and Northwestern. Goodwin played football for Althoff as a tight end and wide receiver, helping his team achieve a Class 4A runner-up finish as a sophomore, and received football scholarship offers from Iowa and New Mexico.

== College career ==
On January 13, 2018, Goodwin recorded the first triple-double in Saint Louis history, with 13 points, 15 rebounds and 10 assists in a 76–63 win over Duquesne. On February 10, he scored a career-high 28 points along with nine rebounds in a 70–62 victory over La Salle. Goodwin was suspended for the remainder of his freshman season after being one of four players accused of sexual assault, although no charges were filed and he was later cleared. As a freshman, he averaged 11.5 points, 7.5 rebounds and four assists per game. In his sophomore season, Goodwin averaged 10.5 points, 7.5 rebounds and 3.4 assists per game. He recorded 66 steals, the fifth most in a season in program history.

He assumed a leading role as a junior, describing himself as a player-coach. On December 19, 2019, Goodwin grabbed a career-high 19 rebounds while contributing 14 points and four assists in a 69–60 win over Southern Illinois. In his junior season, he averaged 15.5 points, 10.4 rebounds, 3.1 assists and 2.1 steals per game, earning First Team All-Atlantic 10 and Atlantic 10 All-Defensive Team honors. Goodwin led all NCAA Division I guards in double-doubles, with 15, and was the only Division I player standing under 6 feet 3 inches (1.91 m) to rank in the top 100 nationally in rebounding. He and Hasahn French were the only teammates in the nation to average double-doubles. Goodwin declared for the 2020 NBA draft before withdrawing his name and opting to return to Saint Louis. As a senior, he averaged 14.5 points, 10.1 rebounds, 3.9 assists, and 2 steals per game. Goodwin was named to the first-team All-Atlantic 10 and Atlantic 10 All-Defensive team after breaking Saint Louis's record for steals.

== Professional career ==
=== Washington Wizards / Capital City Go-Go (2021–2023) ===
After going undrafted in the 2021 NBA draft, Goodwin joined the Washington Wizards for the 2021 NBA Summer League. On September 21, 2021, he signed with the Wizards. Goodwin was waived on October 16. In October 2021, he joined the Capital City Go-Go as an affiliate player. He averaged 15.8 points, 5.9 rebounds and 3.6 assists per game.

On December 27, 2021, the Washington Wizards signed Goodwin to a ten-day contract. He played for the Wizards on December 28 and 30 that year, but did not play any further games during that time. After his contract expired, he returned to the Go-Go.

Goodwin joined the Wizards during the 2022 offseason for training camp and had his deal converted to a two-way contract on October 15, 2022. On February 24, 2023, the Wizards signed him to a multi-year contract.

=== Phoenix Suns (2023–2024) ===
On June 24, 2023, the Wizards traded Goodwin, along with Isaiah Todd and Bradley Beal, to the Phoenix Suns in exchange for a package that included four first-round pick swaps, six second-round picks, Landry Shamet and Chris Paul.

On February 8, 2024, Goodwin was traded to the Brooklyn Nets in a three-team trade involving the Memphis Grizzlies, but was waived the next day.

=== Memphis Grizzlies / Hustle (2024) ===
On February 13, 2024, Goodwin signed a 10-day contract with the Memphis Grizzlies and on February 24, he signed a two-way contract with the Grizzlies.

=== Los Angeles / South Bay Lakers (2024–2025) ===
On September 6, 2024, Goodwin signed with the Los Angeles Lakers, but was waived on October 18. On October 26, he joined the South Bay Lakers. On February 7, 2025, Goodwin signed a two-way contract with the Lakers. He made 29 appearances (five starts) for Los Angeles, averaging 5.6 points, 3.9 rebounds, and 1.4 assists. On July 20, Goodwin was waived by the Lakers.

=== Second stint with Suns (2025–present) ===
On July 24, 2025, it was announced Goodwin had been claimed off waivers by the Phoenix Suns, the team he played for from 2023 to 2024. On January 4, 2026, Goodwin put up a career-high 26 points on a career-high eight three-pointers made in a 108–105 win over the Oklahoma City Thunder. Goodwin made 70 appearances (including 10 starts) for Phoenix during the 2025–26 season, recording averages of 8.7 points, 4.9 rebounds, and 2.2 assists.

On June 21, 2026, Goodwin re-signed with the Suns on a three-year, $19 million contract.

== Career statistics ==
Legend
| GP | Games played | GS | Games started | MPG | Minutes per game |
| FG% | Field goal percentage | 3P% | 3-point field goal percentage | FT% | Free throw percentage |
| RPG | Rebounds per game | APG | Assists per game | SPG | Steals per game |
| BPG | Blocks per game | PPG | Points per game | **Bold** | Career high |

=== NBA ===
==== Regular season ====
| Year | Team | GP | GS | MPG | FG% | 3P% | FT% | RPG | APG | SPG | BPG | PPG |
|---|---|---|---|---|---|---|---|---|---|---|---|---|
| 2021–22 | Washington | 2 | 0 | 3.0 | .000 | .000 | — | .5 | .0 | .0 | .0 | .0 |
| 2022–23 | Washington | 62 | 7 | 17.8 | **.448** | .322 | .768 | 3.3 | 2.7 | .9 | .4 | 6.6 |
| 2023–24 | Phoenix | 40 | 0 | 14.0 | .389 | .288 | **.862** | 2.9 | 2.0 | .6 | .2 | 5.0 |
| 2023–24 | Memphis | 17 | **12** | **29.3** | .349 | .311 | .633 | **8.0** | **4.5** | **1.5** | **.5** | **10.0** |
| 2024–25 | L.A. Lakers | 29 | 5 | 18.7 | .438 | **.382** | .818 | 3.9 | 1.4 | 1.0 | .4 | 5.6 |
| 2025–26 | Phoenix | **70** | 10 | 22.5 | .413 | .371 | .696 | 4.9 | 2.2 | **1.5** | .2 | 8.7 |
| Career | | 220 | 34 | 19.5 | .411 | .346 | .744 | 4.1 | 2.3 | 1.1 | .3 | 7.0 |

==== Playoffs ====
| Year | Team | GP | GS | MPG | FG% | 3P% | FT% | RPG | APG | SPG | BPG | PPG |
|---|---|---|---|---|---|---|---|---|---|---|---|---|
| 2025 | L.A. Lakers | **4** | 0 | **7.8** | .200 | .000 | **.500** | **1.3** | **.5** | **.3** | **.3** | .8 |
| 2026 | Phoenix | 1 | **1** | 5.0 | **.250** | .000 | — | .0 | .0 | .0 | .0 | **2.0** |
| Career | | 5 | 1 | 7.2 | .222 | .000 | .500 | 1.0 | .4 | .2 | .2 | 1.0 |

=== College ===
| Year | Team | GP | GS | MPG | FG% | 3P% | FT% | RPG | APG | SPG | BPG | PPG |
|---|---|---|---|---|---|---|---|---|---|---|---|---|
| 2017–18 | Saint Louis | 26 | 26 | 33.4 | .372 | .235 | **.691** | 7.5 | **4.0** | 2.0 | **.6** | 11.5 |
| 2018–19 | Saint Louis | **36** | **35** | 34.2 | .403 | .263 | .511 | 7.5 | 3.4 | 1.8 | .3 | 10.5 |
| 2019–20 | Saint Louis | 31 | 31 | **35.9** | **.473** | .282 | .538 | **10.4** | 3.1 | **2.1** | .2 | **15.5** |
| 2020–21 | Saint Louis | 21 | 21 | 33.1 | .430 | **.314** | .643 | 10.1 | 3.9 | 2.0 | .2 | 14.5 |
| Career | | 114 | 113 | 34.3 | .423 | .271 | .580 | 8.8 | 3.5 | 2.0 | .3 | 12.8 |
