= 2017–18 Saint Louis Billikens men's basketball team =

American college basketball season

2017–18 Saint Louis Billikens men's basketball
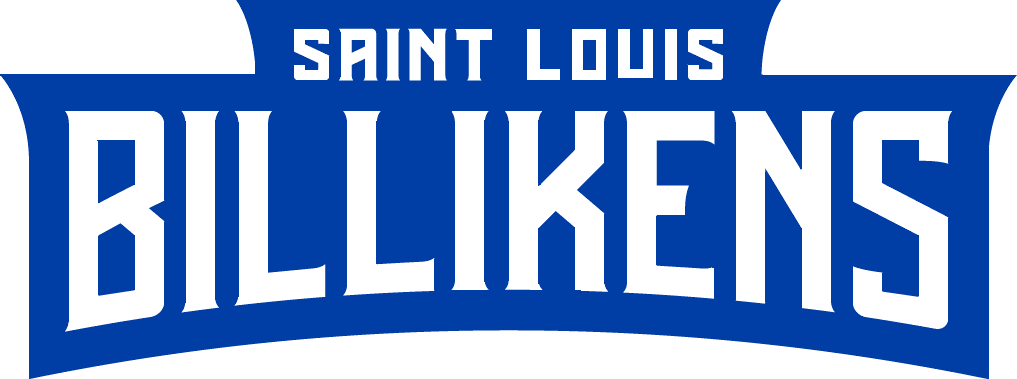
- Conference: Atlantic 10 Conference
- Record: 17–16 (9–9 A-10)
- Head coach: Travis Ford (2nd season)
- Assistant coaches: Will Bailey; Van Macon; Corey Tate
- Home arena: Chaifetz Arena

2017–18 Atlantic 10 men's basketball standings
	Conf.				Overall
Team	W		L	PCT	W		L	PCT
Rhode Island	15	–	3	.833	26	–	8	.765
St. Bonaventure	14	–	4	.778	26	–	8	.765
Davidson †	13	–	5	.722	21	–	12	.636
Saint Joseph's	10	–	8	.556	16	–	16	.500
VCU	9	–	9	.500	18	–	15	.545
Saint Louis	9	–	9	.500	17	–	16	.515
George Mason	9	–	9	.500	16	–	17	.485
Richmond	9	–	9	.500	12	–	20	.375
Dayton	8	–	10	.444	14	–	17	.452
Duquesne	7	–	11	.389	16	–	16	.500
George Washington	7	–	11	.389	15	–	18	.455
La Salle	7	–	11	.389	13	–	19	.406
Massachusetts	5	–	13	.278	13	–	20	.394
Fordham	4	–	14	.222	9	–	22	.290
† 2018 A10 Tournament winner Rankings from AP poll

The 2017–18 Saint Louis Billikens men's basketball team represented Saint Louis University in the 2017–18 NCAA Division I men's basketball season. Their head coach was Travis Ford in his second season at Saint Louis. The team played their home games at Chaifetz Arena as a member of the Atlantic 10 Conference. They finished the season 17–16, 9–9 in A-10 play to finish in a four-way tie for fifth place. As the No. 6 seed in the A-10 tournament, they defeated George Washington in the second round before losing to Davidson in the quarterfinals.

== Previous season ==
The Billikens finished the 2016–17 season 11–21, 5–13 in A-10 play to finish in 11th place. They received the No. 11 seed in the A-10 tournament where they defeated Duquesne in the first round to advance to the second round where they lost to George Washington.

== Offseason ==
=== Departures ===
Name	Number	Pos.	Height	Weight	Year	Hometown	Notes
Matt Neufeld	13	C	6'11"	220	Junior	Victoria, BC	Transferred to UC Davis
Zeke Moore	23	G	6'6"	175	Sophomore	St. Louis, MO	Transferred to Tulsa
Austin Gillman	25	C	6'10"	220	Junior	Oakville, MO	Voluntarily Withdrawn
Mike Crawford	32	F	6'4"	200	Senior	Tipton, IN	Graduated
Reggie Agbeko	35	F	6'7"	240	Senior	Buffalo, NY	Graduated

=== Incoming transfers ===
Name	Number	Pos.	Height	Weight	Year	Hometown	Previous School
Rashed Anthony	25	F	6'9"	235	Senior	Orangeburg, SC	Transferred from Seton Hall. Graduate Transfer, eligible immediately.
Luis Santos	42	C	6'9"	266	Junior	Bronx, NY	Transferred from South Florida. Under NCAA transfer rules, Santos will have to sit out for the 2017–18 season. Will have two years of remaining eligibility.

=== 2017 recruiting class ===
College recruiting information
Name	Hometown	School	Height	Weight	Commit date
Jordan Goodwin #12 SG	Belleville, IL	Althoff Catholic High School	6 ft 4 in (1.93 m)	210 lb (95 kg)	Aug 12, 2016
Jordan Goodwin #12 SG	Recruit ratings: Scout: Rivals: 247Sports: (85)				
Hasahn French #15 PF	Middletown, NY	Commonwealth Academy	6 ft 7 in (2.01 m)	230 lb (100 kg)	Oct 24, 2016
Hasahn French #15 PF	Recruit ratings: Scout: Rivals: 247Sports: (83)				
Overall recruit ranking:
Note: In many cases, Scout, Rivals, 247Sports, On3, and ESPN may conflict in their listings of height and weight.; In these cases, the average was taken. ESPN grades are on a 100-point scale.; Sources:

=== 2018 recruiting class ===
College recruiting information (2018)
Name	Hometown	School	Height	Weight	Commit date
Carte'Are Gordon; PF	St. Louis, MO	Webster Groves High School	6 ft 8 in (2.03 m)	245 lb (111 kg)	Aug 26, 2016
Carte'Are Gordon; PF	Recruit ratings: Scout: Rivals: 247Sports: (91)				
Fred Thatch; SG	Sikeston, MO	Sikeston High School	6 ft 3 in (1.91 m)	195 lb (88 kg)	Jan 12, 2017
Fred Thatch; SG	Recruit ratings: Scout: Rivals: 247Sports: (79)				
Mickey Pearson; SF	Elizabethtown, KY	John Hardin High School	6 ft 7 in (2.01 m)	180 lb (82 kg)	Oct 14, 2017 - released June 19, 2018
Mickey Pearson; SF	Recruit ratings: Scout: Rivals: 247Sports: (N/A)				
Demarius Jacobs; SG	Chicago, IL	Hillcrest Prep Academy	6 ft 2 in (1.88 m)	165 lb (75 kg)	Feb 25, 2018
Demarius Jacobs; SG	Recruit ratings: Scout: Rivals: 247Sports: (N/A)				
Ingvi Gudmundsson; SG	Grindavík, Iceland	Fjölbrautaskóli Suðurnesja	6 ft 6 in (1.98 m)	N/A	Apr 11, 2018
Ingvi Gudmundsson; SG	Recruit ratings: Scout: Rivals: 247Sports: (N/A)				
KC Hankton; SF	Charlotte, NC	United Faith Christian Academy	6 ft 8 in (2.03 m)	185 lb (84 kg)	May 31, 2018
KC Hankton; SF	Recruit ratings: Scout: Rivals: 247Sports: (N/A)				
Overall recruit ranking:
Note: In many cases, Scout, Rivals, 247Sports, On3, and ESPN may conflict in their listings of height and weight.; In these cases, the average was taken. ESPN grades are on a 100-point scale.; Sources:

== Preseason ==
In a poll of the league's head coaches and select media members at the conference's media day, the Billikens were picked to finish in seventh place in the A-10.

== Title IX Investigation ==
On September 24, 2017, three women alleged sexual assault by four players. A Title IX investigation was opened on September 26, 2017. When exhibition season opened and during the season, Ty Graves, Adonys Henriquez and Jermaine Bishop were not on the bench during games and the team plays with eight scholarship players. January 19, 2018 the university announces that the four players were informed of the Title IX findings and given suspensions ranging from 18 to 24 months, with one player being expelled. The players appeal the decision and the team continues to play with the same roster as the start of the season. February 6, 2013, Graves announced he was leaving the school and it is reported that Henriquez signed with an agent and that Jermaine Bishop had practiced through the end of the week. February 13, 2018, the university announces it has concluded its Title IX investigation and all parties have been notified of the final decisions, which were determined by the Appeal Panel. Jordan Goodwin was suspended for the remainder of the season and was no longer enrolled in the school as he was found to be in violation of university policy. February 15, 2018, Graves announces he is transferring to North Carolina Central University. March 1, 2018, Club San Lazaro of the Dominican Republic announced they have signed Henriquez to a professional contract. May 22, 2018, Goodwin re-enrolled at SLU. June 6, 2018, Bishop announced he was transferring to Norfolk State.

== Roster ==
2017–18 Saint Louis Billikens men's basketball team
Players
Coaches

Pos.	#	Name	Height	Weight	Year	Previous school	Hometown
G	0	Jordan Goodwin	6 ft 3 in (1.91 m)	215 lb (98 kg)	Fr	Althoff Catholic	Centreville, Il
C	1	D. J. Foreman	6 ft 8 in (2.03 m)	240 lb (109 kg)	RS Jr	Massanutten Academy; Rutgers	Spring Valley, NY
G	2	Ty Graves (S)	6 ft 0 in (1.83 m)	170 lb (77 kg)	RS So	High Point Christian Academy; Boston College	Greensboro, NC
G	3	Javon Bess	6 ft 6 in (1.98 m)	220 lb (100 kg)	RS Jr	Gahanna Lincoln; Michigan State	Columbus, OH
G	5	Davell Roby	6 ft 4 in (1.93 m)	200 lb (91 kg)	Sr	White Station	Memphis, TN
G	10	Adonys Henriquez (S)	6 ft 6 in (1.98 m)	215 lb (98 kg)	RS Jr	Orlando Christian Prep; Central Florida	Orlando, FL
G	11	Jermaine Bishop (S)	6 ft 1 in (1.85 m)	180 lb (82 kg)	RS So	Holy Cross	Queens, NY
F	20	Jalen Johnson	6 ft 7 in (2.01 m)	210 lb (95 kg)	So	University Laboratory School	Baton Rouge, LA
G	21	Markos Psimitis (W)	6 ft 5 in (1.96 m)	205 lb (93 kg)	RS Jr	Experimental; Harris-Stowe	Mytilene, Greece
F	22	Hasahn French	6 ft 7 in (2.01 m)	235 lb (107 kg)	Fr	Commonwealth Academy	Middletown, NY
G	24	Aaron Hines	6 ft 0 in (1.83 m)	180 lb (82 kg)	RS Sr	Parkway North; John Wood CC	St. Louis, MO
C	25	Rashed Anthony	6 ft 9 in (2.06 m)	230 lb (104 kg)	GS	Flora MacDonald Academy; Seton Hall	Orangeburg, SC
G	31	Jack Raboin (W)	6 ft 6 in (1.98 m)	205 lb (93 kg)	Jr	Mattoon High School; Lake Land College	Mattoon, IL
F	33	Elliott Welmer (injured) (redshirt)	6 ft 9 in (2.06 m)	220 lb (100 kg)	RS So	Bridgton Academy	Columbus, IN
C	42	Luis Santos (I) (redshirt)	6 ft 9 in (2.06 m)	250 lb (113 kg)	Jr	Sunrise Christian Academy; South Florida	Santiago, Dominican Republic

Head coach

- Travis Ford (Kentucky)

Assistant coach(es)

- Will Bailey (UAB)
- Van Macon (Southampton)
- Corey Tate (Missouri)

Legend

- (C) Team captain
- (S) Suspended
- (I) Ineligible
- (W) Walk-on
- Injured
- Current redshirt

== Schedule and results ==
Date time, TV	Rank^{#}	Opponent^{#}	Result	Record	Site (attendance) city, state
Exhibition
Nov 4, 2017*; 7:00 pm		Harris-Stowe	W 69–51		Chaifetz Arena; St. Louis, MO
Regular season
Nov 10, 2017*; 7:00 pm, FSMW		Seattle; 2K Sports Classic	W 62–46	1–0	Chaifetz Arena (7,256); St. Louis, MO
Nov 13, 2017*; 7:30 pm		Rockhurst	W 74–50	2–0	Chaifetz Arena (5,009); St. Louis, MO
Nov 16, 2017*; 6:00 pm, ESPN2		vs. Virginia Tech; 2K Sports Classic semifinal	W 77–71	3–0	Madison Square Garden (6,104); New York City, NY
Nov 17, 2017*; 6:30 pm, ESPN2		vs. Providence; 2K Sports Classic championship	L 63–90	3–1	Madison Square Garden (6,173); New York City, NY
Nov 22, 2017*; 7:00 pm, FSMW		Detroit; 2K Sports Classic	L 70–72	3–2	Chaifetz Arena (6,026); St. Louis, MO
Nov 28, 2017*; 7:00 pm, FSMW		Western Michigan	L 51–65	3–3	Chaifetz Arena (5,081); St. Louis, MO
Dec 2, 2017*; 1:00 pm, FS1		at Butler	L 45–75	3–4	Hinkle Fieldhouse (8,963); Indianapolis, IN
Dec 6, 2017*; 7:00 pm, FSMW		Southern Illinois	W 74–69	4–4	Chaifetz Arena (5,633); St. Louis, MO
Dec 9, 2017*; 7:00 pm, Stadium		Houston	L 58–77	4–5	Chaifetz Arena (6,014); St. Louis, MO
Dec 12, 2017*; 7:00 pm, FSMW		Murray State	W 69–55	5–5	Chaifetz Arena (4,971); St. Louis, MO
Dec 16, 2017*; 9:30 pm, P12N		vs. Oregon State; Dam City Classic	L 60–63	5–6	Moda Center (8,110); Portland, OR
Dec 19, 2017*; 7:30 pm		Campbell	W 74–66	6–6	Chaifetz Arena (5,017); St. Louis, MO
Dec 22, 2017*; 6:00 pm, FSMW		Southeast Missouri State	W 78–48	7–6	Chaifetz Arena (8,021); St. Louis, MO
A-10 regular season
Dec 30, 2017; 1:00 pm		at La Salle	L 60–83	7–7 (0–1)	Tom Gola Arena (1,437); Philadelphia, PA
Jan 3, 2018; 6:00 pm		at Davidson	L 51–54	7–8 (0–2)	John M. Belk Arena (3,140); Davidson, NC
Jan 6, 2018; 7:00 pm, FSMW		Richmond	W 69–62	8–8 (1–2)	Chaifetz Arena (7,291); St. Louis, MO
Jan 9, 2018; 6:00 pm, CBSSN		Rhode Island	L 65–72	8–9 (1–3)	Chaifetz Arena (5,179); St. Louis, MO
Jan 13, 2018; 1:30 pm, NBCSN		at George Mason	L 81–86	8–10 (1–4)	EagleBank Arena (3,284); Fairfax, VA
Jan 17, 2018; 7:00 pm		Duquesne	W 76–63	9–10 (2–4)	Chaifetz Arena (5,227); St. Louis, MO
Jan 20, 2018; 1:00 pm, Stadium		at Massachusetts	W 66–47	10–10 (3–4)	Mullins Center (4,121); Amherst, MA
Jan 23, 2018; 8:00 pm, CBSSN		VCU	L 74–75 ^{OT}	10–11 (3–5)	Chaifetz Arena (5,649); St. Louis, MO
Jan 27, 2018; 3:00 pm, CBSSN		Dayton	W 75–65	11–11 (4–5)	Chaifetz Arena (8,552); St. Louis, MO
Jan 31, 2018; 6:00 pm		at Saint Joseph's	W 60–59	12–11 (5–5)	Hagan Arena (3,143); Philadelphia, PA
Feb 3, 2018; 7:00 pm, FSMW+		Fordham	W 73–50	13–11 (6–5)	Chaifetz Arena (7,312); St. Louis, MO
Feb 7, 2018; 6:00 pm		at St. Bonaventure	L 56–79	13–12 (6–6)	Reilly Center (3,448); Olean, NY
Feb 10, 2018; 7:00 pm, FSMW		La Salle	W 70–62	14–12 (7–6)	Chaifetz Arena (5,229); St. Louis, MO
Feb 17, 2018; 5:00 pm, FSMW		at Richmond	W 72–66	15–12 (8–6)	Robins Center (7,201); Richmond, VA
Feb 20, 2018; 8:00 pm, ESPNU		at Dayton	L 50–53	15–13 (8–7)	UD Arena (12,577); Dayton, OH
Feb 24, 2018; 7:00 pm, FSMW		George Washington	W 62–53	16–13 (9–7)	Chaifetz Arena (6,238); St. Louis, MO
Feb 28, 2018; 6:00 pm, Stadium		at Duquesne	L 69–76	16–14 (9–8)	Palumbo Center (2,272); Pittsburgh, PA
Mar 3, 2018; 7:00 pm, FSMW		St. Bonaventure	L 56–64	16–15 (9–9)	Chaifetz Arena (8,542); St. Louis, MO
A-10 tournament
Mar 8, 2018; 7:30 pm, NBCSN	(6)	vs. (11) George Washington; Second round	W 70–63	17–15	Capital One Arena (6,514); Washington, D.C.
Mar 9, 2018; 7:30 pm, NBCSN	(6)	vs. (3) Davidson; Quarterfinals	L 60–78	17–16	Capital One Arena (7,664); Washington, D.C.
*Non-conference game. ^{#}Rankings from AP Poll. (#) Tournament seedings in parentheses. All times are in Central Time.
