= Dick Boushka =

American basketball player (1934–2019)

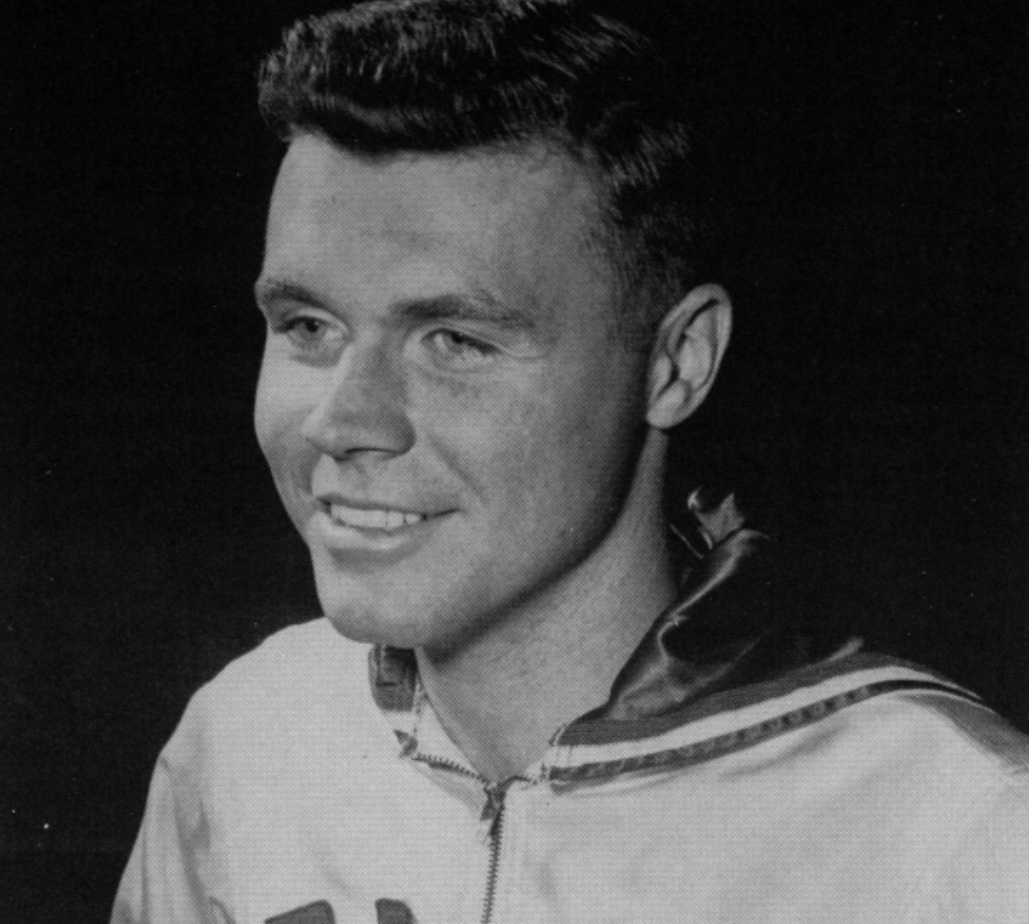
- Boushka in 1955.

Personal information
- Born: July 29, 1934 Springfield, Illinois, U.S.
- Died: February 19, 2019 (aged 84) Port St. Lucie, Florida, U.S.
- Listed height: 6 ft 5 in (1.96 m)
- Listed weight: 209 lb (95 kg)

Career information
- High school: Campion (Prairie du Chien, Wisconsin)
- College: Saint Louis (1951–1955)
- NBA draft: 1955: 3rd round, 20th overall pick
- Drafted by: Minneapolis Lakers
- Position: Forward

Career highlights
- Third-team All-American – AP (1955); 3× First-team All-MVC (1953–1955); 2× AAU All-American (1957, 1959); No. 24 jersey retired by Saint Louis Billikens
- Stats at Basketball Reference
Medals
Men's basketball
Representing United States
Olympic Games
| Gold medal – first place | 1956 Melbourne | Team competition |
Pan American Games
| Gold medal – first place | 1959 Chicago | Team competition |

Richard James Boushka (July 29, 1934 – February 19, 2019) was an American basketball player who competed in the 1956 Summer Olympics. Born in Springfield, Illinois, Boushka played collegiately at Saint Louis University. Boushka died on February 19, 2019.

== Sports career ==
Boushka won a gold medal with the 1956 U.S. Olympic team. Stationed at Kirtland Air Force Base, he won an AUA championship with the Air Force All Stars in 1957. He was a member of the American team in the 1959 Pan American Games and was a standout player for the Wichita (Kansas) Vickers of the AAU. Boushka eventually became the president of team sponsor Vickers Petroleum. Boushka was named to the Saint Louis Billikens All Century Team. He was on the team with other Saint Louis players such as Jordair Jett, Anthony Bonner, and Larry Hughes.

== Financial career ==
After parimutuel gambling was legalized in Kansas in 1986, Boushka approached RD Hubbard with the idea of a greyhound track. The Los Angeles Times wrote that they planned on building a "combined horse-dog complex, and now Kansas has a $70-million facility [named The Woodlands], the two tracks sharing a joint parking lot." According to Hubbard, "if we didn't do what we did, the greyhounds and the horses would have wound up competing against one another in the same market. It was a better idea getting the two industries to work together." In Kansas City, they funded the construction and opening of The Woodlands racing park in 1989. Built to serve as both a greyhound track and later as a horse racing track, the venue was the first legal gambling outlet in the area since the 1930s, and in its second year attendance peaked at 1.7 million attendees.

=== Fraud ===
In 2002, Boushka pleaded guilty to two counts of bank fraud, one count of making false statements to obtain a bank loan, and one count of omitting information for the sale of a security. He was sentenced to 70 months in prison.
