= 2014–15 Basketball Championship of Bosnia and Herzegovina =

Prvenstva BiH
- Teams: 14

Regular season
- Relegated: HEO; Čelik; Bosna Royal

Finals
- Champions: Igokea (4th title)
- Runners-up: HKK Široki

The 2014–15 Basketball Championship of Bosnia and Herzegovina was the 14th season of this championship, with 12 teams from Bosnia participating in it.

== Current season teams (2014-2015) ==
Team	City	Venue (Capacity)
OKK Sloboda Tuzla	Tuzla	Javno preduzeće SKPC Velika dvorana Mejdan (6,000)
KK HEO	Bileća	Univerzalna SD Bileća (2,000)
KK Bosna Royal	Sarajevo	Olympic Hall Zetra(capacity: 12.000)
KK Čelik	Zenica	
KK Leotar	Trebinje	Sportska dvorana Miloš Mrdić (2,000)
KK Građanski	Bijeljina	
Varda HE	Višegrad	Sportska dvorana Višegrad (1,000)
KK Mladost Mrkonjić Grad	Mrkonjić Grad	Arena Komercijalna banka AD (2,000)
OKK Spars	Sarajevo	
KK Kakanj	Kakanj	Sportska dvorana Kakanj (1,300)
HKK Zrinjski Mostar	Mostar	Školska dvorana Bijeli Brijeg (1,000)
HKK Široki	Široki Brijeg	

== Regular season ==
Pos	Team	Pld	W	L	PF	PA	PD	Pts	Qualification
1	Spars	22	20	2	1646	1391	+255	42	Advance to Liga 6
2	Leotar	22	14	8	1631	1536	+95	36	Advance to Liga 6
3	Sloboda Tuzla	22	14	8	1604	1522	+82	36	Advance to Liga 6
4	Široki	22	13	9	1659	1523	+136	35	Advance to Liga 6
5	Zrinjski Mostar	22	13	9	1660	1612	+48	35	Advance to Liga 6
6	Kakanj	22	12	10	1652	1613	+39	34	
7	Građanski	22	9	13	1620	1657	−37	31	
8	Mladost	22	9	13	1551	1602	−51	31	
9	Varda HE	22	8	14	1506	1631	−125	30	
10	HEO	22	9	13	1499	1566	−67	30	Relegated
11	Čelik	22	7	15	1569	1751	−182	29	Relegated
12	Bosna Royal	22	5	17	1574	1767	−193	27	Relegated

Source: eurobasket

=== Results ===
Home \ Away	BOS	CEL	GRA	HEO	KAK	LEO	MLA	SIR	SLO	SPA	VAR	ZRI
KK Bosna Royal		82–73	70–82	88–82	67–73	57–63	82–64	84–80	70–87	60–94	60–66	97–99
KK Čelik	93–89		61–81	80–72	71–70	65–72	76–58	91–82	83–75	76–54	74–77	66–88
KK Građanski	67–52	94–69		72–65	70–75	63–72	74–64	80–85	64–82	68–69	74–68	86–79
KK HEO	82–72	89–62	80–60		76–72	78–70	82–75	75–64	82–85	50–67	66–62	65–49
KK Kakanj	95–84	79–71	82–63	79–72		84–81	75–57	62–71	81–62	64–73	64–65	90–100
KK Leotar	85–74	106–66	73–65	75–55	77–84		89–66	87–81	61–60	70–61	81–62	67–59
KK Mladost	84–63	92–49	72–63	87–78	75–78	67–82		58–50	79–66	84–94	73–53	67–57
HKK Široki	95–48	75–69	71–57	75–44	74–61	63–51	87–68		87–74	64–74	96–66	88–76
OKK Sloboda Tuzla	92–79	76–64	73–67	20–0	84–79	84–72	69–76	87–80		59–60	93–84	97–68
OKK Spars	72–68	74–58	86–65	93–64	69–62	78–51	74–42	74–68	78–66		75–46	68–60
KK Varda HE	65–77	83–80	53–63	76–70	84–69	82–75	82–68	63–68	60–72	67–72		69–81
HKK Zrinjski Mostar	74–51	83–72	75–61	83–72	68–74	81–71	79–75	74–55	68–61	79–87	80–73	

Legend: Blue = home team win; Yellow = draw; Red = away team win.

== Liga 6 ==
Pos	Team	Pld	W	L	PF	PA	PD	Pts	Qualification
1	KK Igokea	10	9	1	854	623	+231	19	Advance to Play-offs
2	HKK Široki	10	8	2	751	698	+53	18	Advance to Play-offs
3	OKK Spars	10	5	5	722	736	−14	15	Advance to Play-offs
4	OKK Sloboda Tuzla	10	4	6	770	803	−33	14	Advance to Play-offs
5	KK Leotar	10	2	8	667	778	−111	12	
6	HKK Zrinjski Mostar	10	2	8	736	862	−126	12	

Source: eurobasket

=== Results ===
Home \ Away	IGO	LEO	SIR	SLO	SPA	ZRI
KK Igokea		88–58	78–68	76–52	89–55	111–65
KK Leotar	66–95		53–72	67–59	68–74	89–75
HKK Široki	63–57	71–53		86–82	77–66	88–76
OKK Sloboda Tuzla	64–84	101–99	91–68		70–62	98–81
OKK Spars	68–90	86–58	67–74	97–75		63–57
HKK Zrinjski Mostar	64–86	82–66	75–84	83–78	78–84	

Legend: Blue = home team win; Yellow = draw; Red = away team win.

== Playoffs ==
Semifinals
1	KK Igokea	2
4	OKK Sloboda Tuzla	0
2	HKK Široki	2
3	OKK Spars	0

Finals
1	KK Igokea	3
2	HKK Široki	0

=== Finals ===
May 26

KK Igokea	65–54	HKK Široki
Scoring by quarter: 23-10, 11-14, 13-18, 18-12
Pts: Bunić 14; Rebs: Bunić 9 Asts: Katnić 5		Pts: Katić 11; Rebs: Remekun 15; Asts: 3 players 2

Laktaši Sports Hall, Laktaši

May 30

HKK Široki	71–87	KK Igokea
Scoring by quarter: 17-27, 17-16, 19-28, 18-16
Pts: Bilinovac 17; Rebs: Bošnjak 6 Asts: Bilinovac, Naletilić 3		Pts: Bunić 18; Rebs: Bunić 10; Asts: Katnić 8

Pecara, Široki Brijeg

June 2

KK Igokea	82–58	HKK Široki
Scoring by quarter: 24-14, 20-18, 20-16, 18-10
Pts: Heslip 24; Rebs: Jorović 12; Asts: Katnić 4		Pts: Katić 14; Rebs: Remekun 7 Asts: Katić 5

Laktaši Sports Hall, Laktaši
