= KK HEO =

HEO
- Leagues: First League of R Srpska
- Founded: 1981; 44 years ago
- History: KK Hercegovac; 1981–2012; KK Heo; 2012–present
- Arena: Bileća Sports Hall
- Capacity: 2,000
- Location: Bileća, Bosnia and Herzegovina
- Team colors: Blue, white

KK Heo Bileća (a.k.a. KK HEO; previously known as KK Hercegovac Bileća) is a Bosnian basketball club that currently competes in the First League of R Srpska. Founded in 1981, the club is based in Bileća.

For most of the 2000s, Hercegovac Bileća competed in the Basketball Championship of Bosnia and Herzegovina, the top basketball league in the country. In 2002–03, the club participated in the FIBA Europe Regional Challenge Cup. Hercegovac Bileća later withdrew from the Bosnian top league in 2012 and the club took on a new name in KK HEO and re-joined the second division Srpska Liga. They finished first on the Srpska Liga ladder in both 2012–13 and 2013–14, which earned them promotion to the Basketball Championship of Bosnia and Herzegovina for 2014–15. They returned to the Srpska Liga in 2015–16.

== Notable former players ==
- (Bosnia and Herzegovina) Milan Milošević
- (Bosnia and Herzegovina) Draško Albijanić
- (Bosnia and Herzegovina) Žarko Vujović
- (Bosnia and Herzegovina) Željko Bošnjak
- (Bosnia and Herzegovina) Goran Radmilović
- (Bosnia and Herzegovina) Dragan Vujović
- (Serbia) Saša Topčov
- (Serbia) Zoran Negovanović
- (Bosnia and Herzegovina) Lazar Simonović
- (Serbia) Dragan Timotić
