= John Nasseff =

American philanthropist (1924–2018)

- Born: February 21, 1924; St. Paul, Minnesota, US
- Died: February 21, 2018 (aged 94); St. Paul, Minnesota, US
- Occupation: Businessman
- Employer: West Publishing
- Known for: Philanthropy

John Nasseff (February 21, 1924 – February 21, 2018) was an American businessman and philanthropist. Born in St. Paul, Minnesota to Lebanese immigrants, Nasseff dropped out of high school before joining the U.S. Army in World War II. Upon his return he began working at West Publishing, where he gradually rose through the corporate ranks, eventually becoming a vice president of the company. When it was sold to Thomson Corporation, Nasseff's stock was worth $175 million. He spent his later years as a philanthropist for causes in healthcare, education, and public works.

== Early life ==
John Nassef was born on the West Side of Saint Paul, Minnesota, on February 22, 1924, to Betros and Zmorrod Nasseff, immigrants from Lebanon. Betros had originally been rejected at Ellis Island after a mistaken medical diagnosis before eventually crossing the Mexico-Texas border with Zmorrod and arriving in Minnesota in 1916. Nasseff grew up in poverty; his mother sewed together scraps of fabric to sell. The family would trap rabbits and squirrels to eat. Their house was made with tar-paper siding.

When he was twelve years old, he travelled to New York City by hopping freight trains. He attended Roosevelt School in St. Paul, and began attending Humboldt Senior High School before dropping out in ninth grade. He enlisted in the Army and fought on the Pacific Front during World War II with the United States Army Corps of Engineers.

== Career ==
After returning from the military in 1946, Nasseff began working at West Publishing, unloading boxcars. While working there, he suggested to his supervisors some efficiency improvements that could be made, and proposed that instead of a salary, he be paid a percentage of the saved money. His ideas were implemented and he began to rise in the company. Nasseff eventually became the vice president of engineering and facilities, and was the only executive in the company without a college degree. Nasseff was a key player in the resettling of West Publishing from St. Paul to Eagan, Minnesota.

On a trip to Las Vegas in 1977, Nasseff had a heart attack in his hotel room. A doctor from United Hospital in Minnesota, Milton Hurwitz, was playing at a nearby blackjack table and the pitboss, who knew both the doctor and Nasseff, grabbed the doctor and brought him to Nasseff.

West Publishing was sold to Thomson Corporation in 1996. Nasseff's shares were worth $175 million at the time ($359 million in 2025).

== Philanthropy ==
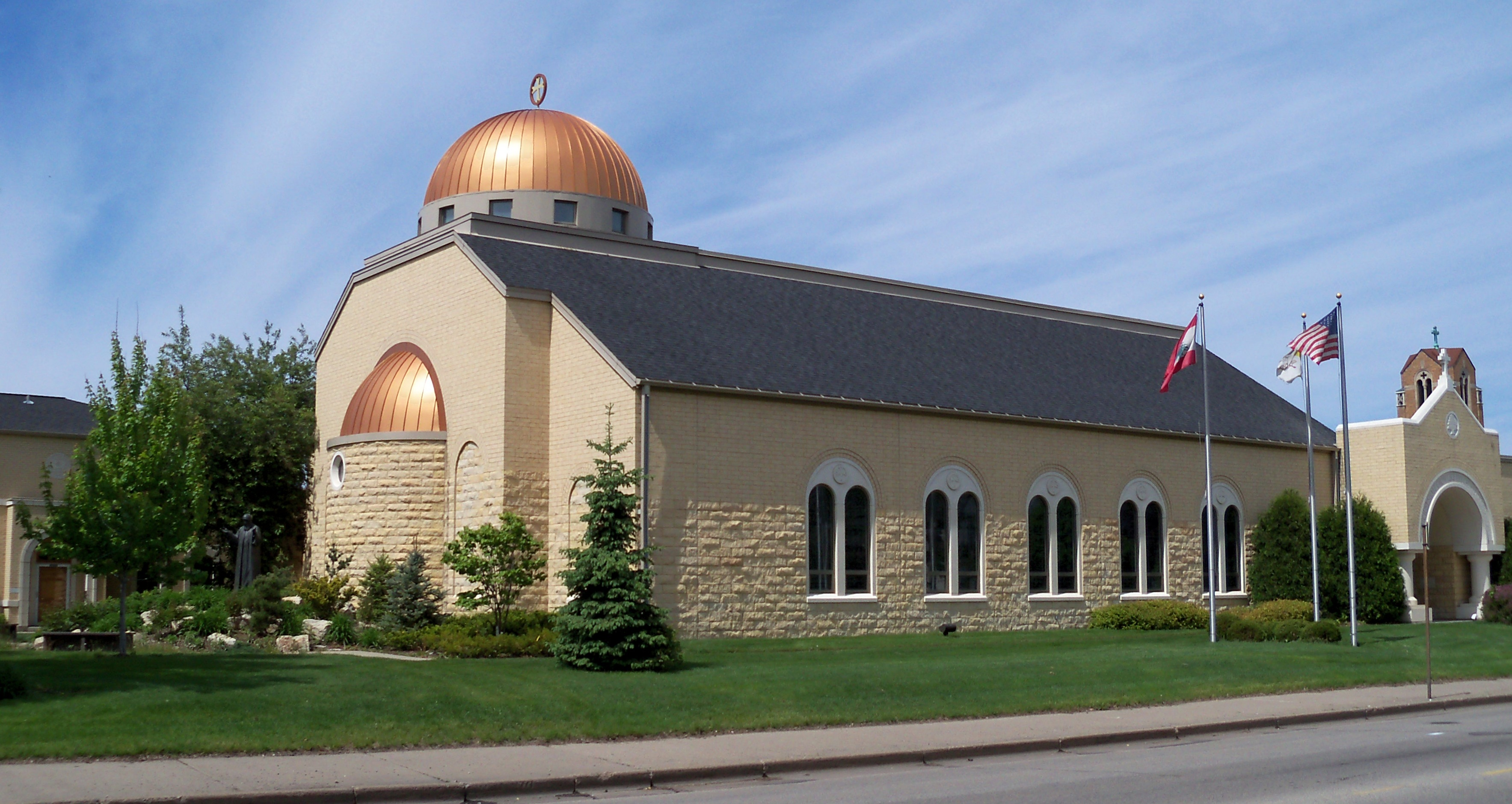
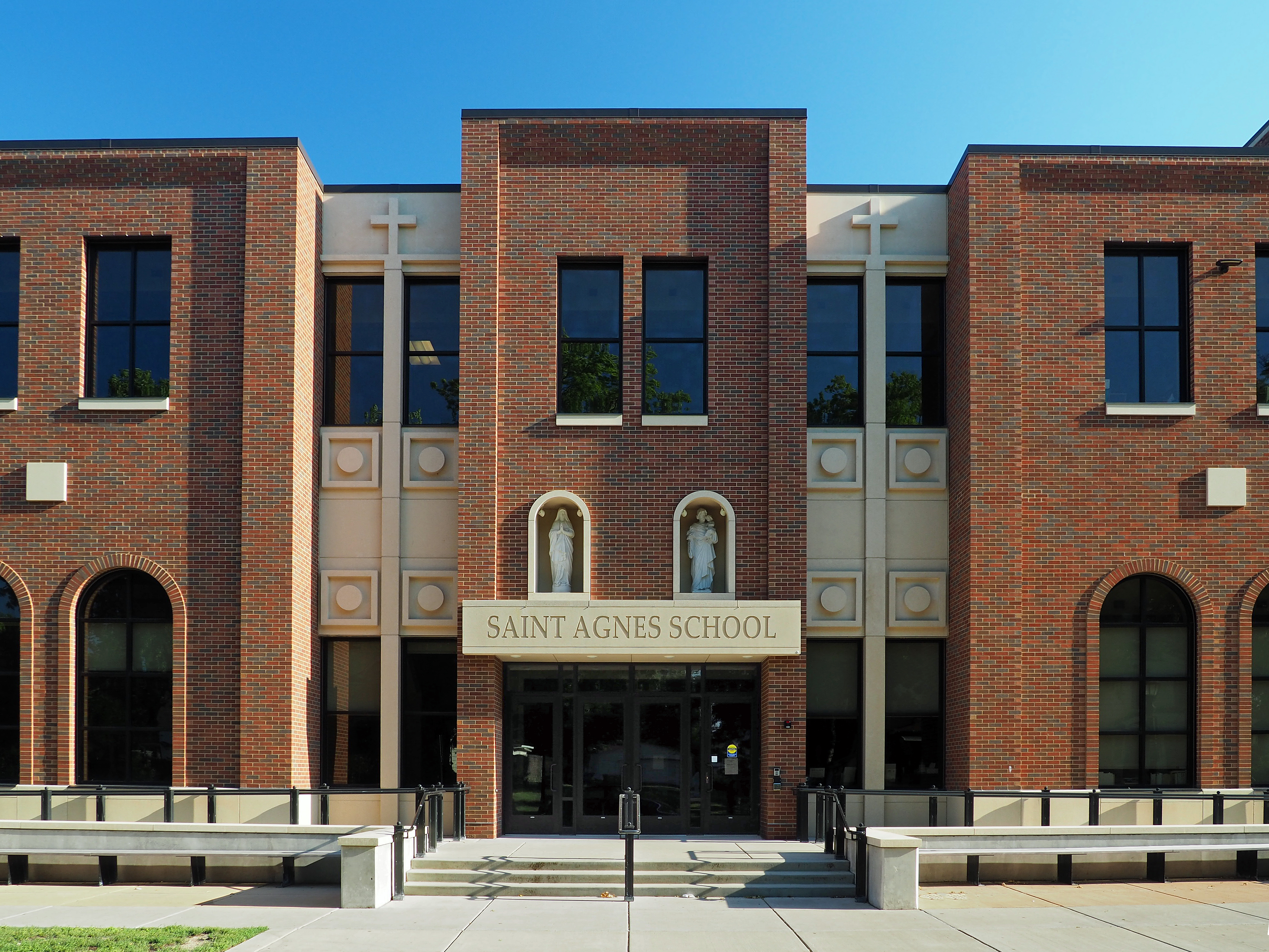
Nasseff donated towards St. Maron's Catholic Church and St. Agnes Catholic School.

After the sale of West, Nasseff used his new multi-millionaire status to donate towards numerous causes in Minnesota. While initially reluctant to put his name on the project, he began as a lead donor to the new heart center for United Hospital in St. Paul, which was named the John Nasseff Heart Center. He went on to donate $5 million towards a new parking facility and the Milton M. Hurwitz ExerCare Fitness Center, named after the United doctor who saved his life in 1977. He also made substantial donations towards the John Nasseff Specialty Center and the John Nasseff Neuroscience Specialty Clinic, both at United.

He donated around $2 million to a project to expand the St. Maron's Maronite Catholic Church in Minneapolis, a congregation with primarily Lebanese members.

He donated over $10 million to the Mayo Clinic, mostly for research around neurosurgery.

Nasseff donated around $1 million to Saint Agnes School in St. Paul, helping an overall $3 million campaign to reduce debt and keep the school from closing. In 2014, Nasseff went on to donate an additional $10 million to St. Agnes, the largest single gift ever to a Catholic school in the Archdiocese of Saint Paul and Minneapolis, to help build a new activities center.

In 2017, he donated $100,000 to the city of Eagan, Minnesota to rebuild its town hall which had been destroyed by arson.

Nasseff also made donations to Saint Paul Police Department, the Little Sisters of the Poor, youth soccer teams in Haiti, a clinic in Lebanon, and orphanages in Mexico.

== Later years and death ==
In his retirement, Nasseff would wear a black beret and walk around downtown St. Paul, where he lived in a 24th-floor condo. He suffered a stroke in 2016.

In January 2018, Nassef's personal caretaker, Nicholas Lofquist-Sprangel, was charged with stealing over $1 million from him over the course of two years through cash, jewelry, and other items. Lofquist-Sprangel pleaded guilty and received a two-year prison sentence.

Nasseff died on February 21, 2018, his 94th birthday.

== Personal life ==
Nassef had two sons, John and Arthur, with his first wife, Rose Hall, whom he married in 1943. His son John died in a motorcycle accident in 2012.

Nasseff married Helen Houle in 1995.

His granddaughter was charged in 2018 with embezzling more than $500,000.
