= Melvin Robinson =

American basketball player

Melvin Robinson (born January 4, 1980) is a retired American basketball player.

He has played collegiately for Saint Louis University from 1990 to 1992. He played during the NBA preseason for the Milwaukee Bucks (1992), Minnesota Timberwolves (1994), Seattle SuperSonics (1995) and Toronto Raptors (1996).

He has also played professionally in Turkey for Mydonose Kolejliler (also known as TED Kolejliler) (2000–02) and Göztepe İzmir (2002–03) and in Mexico for Tuberos de Colima (2005). He also briefly played in Lithuania, for BC Sakalai.

Robinson won a Continental Basketball Association (CBA) championship with the Omaha Racers in 1993.

Robinson is now the JV basketball coach at Martin Luther King Jr highschool on Manhattan's Upper West Side.
