= Duško Bunić =

Serbian basketball player

Personal information
- Born: December 4, 1989 (age 36) Bihać, SFR Yugoslavia
- Listed height: 2.07 m (6 ft 9 in)
- Listed weight: 102 kg (225 lb)

Career information
- NBA draft: 2011: undrafted
- Playing career: 2006–2017
- Position: Center

Career history
- 2006–2007: Spartak Subotica
- 2007–2011: Novi Sad
- 2011: Metalac Valjevo
- 2011–2012: Vojvodina Srbijagas
- 2012–2013: Budućnost Podgorica
- 2013–2015: Igokea
- 2015–2016: MZT Skopje
- 2016–2017: Krka

Career highlights
- Montenegrin League (2013); 2× Bosnian League (2014, 2015); Macedonian League (2016); Bosnian Cup (2015); Macedonian Cup (2016)

Duško Bunić (born December 4, 1989) is a Serbian professional basketball player. He is a 2.07 center who last played for KK Krka.

== International career ==
Bunić was a member of the team that represented Serbia at the 2011 Summer Universiade in Shenzhen, finishing as one of the gold medal winners.
