= Dušan Katnić =

Serbian basketball player (born 1989)

Free agent
- Position: Point guard

Personal information
- Born: March 3, 1989 (age 37) Titovo Užice, SR Serbia, SFR Yugoslavia
- Listed height: 1.95 m (6 ft 5 in)
- Listed weight: 86 kg (190 lb)

Career information
- NBA draft: 2011: undrafted
- Playing career: 2005–present

Career history
- 2005–2010: Mega Vizura
- 2010: Crvena zvezda
- 2010–2013: Telenet Oostende
- 2013–2014: Anwil Włocławek
- 2014: Radnički Kragujevac
- 2014–2015: Igokea
- 2015: Krka Novo Mesto
- 2015–2016: Igokea
- 2016–2017: Dynamic
- 2017: MZT Skopje
- 2017–2018: BBC Monthey
- 2018–2019: Al-Ittihad Jeddah
- 2020–2022: Klik Arilje

Career highlights
- 2× Belgian League champion (2012, 2013); 2× Bosnian League champion (2015, 2016); Macedonian League champion (2017); Belgian Cup winner (2013); 2× Bosnian Cup winner (2015, 2016)

Dušan Katnić (Serbian Cyrillic: Душан Катнић; born March 3, 1989) is a Serbian professional basketball player who last played for Klik Arilje of the Second League of Serbia.

== Professional career ==
Katnić, who grew up with Play-Off from Užice and Atlas, made his professional debut with Mega Ishrana in the 2005–06 season. In March 2010, he left Mega and signed with Crvena zvezda, playing there for a couple of months. In December 2010, he signed a deal with Oostende.

In July 2013, he signed with Anwil Włocławek. He left them in February 2014, and signed with Radnički Kragujevac for the rest of the season. On December 10, 2014 he signed with KK Igokea.

On July 8, 2015, Katnić signed with the Slovenian club KK Krka. On December 9, 2015, he left Krka and returned to Igokea for the rest of the season.

On 9 March 2017, Katnić signed with the Macedonian club MZT Skopje.

== Serbian national team ==
Katnić was a member of the Serbian junior national teams that won gold medals at the 2007 FIBA Under-19 World Championship and the 2008 FIBA Europe Under-20 Championship.
