= Jerry Koch =

American basketball player

Personal information
- Born: c. 1934
- Listed height: 6 ft 4 in (1.93 m)

Career information
- College: Saint Louis (1951–1955)
- NBA draft: 1955: 10th round, 73rd overall pick
- Drafted by: Philadelphia Warriors
- Position: Forward
- Stats at Basketball Reference

Jerry Koch (born c. 1934) is a retired American basketball player. He is known for his collegiate career at Saint Louis University (SLU) between 1951–52 and 1954–55. A forward, Koch once recorded 38 rebounds in a single game. He accomplished the feat on March 5, 1954, against Bradley University. The 38 rebounds remain a SLU and Missouri Valley Conference record. Koch was also instrumental in SLU's 1952 NCAA Tournament Elite Eight appearance; during his freshman season he teamed with his older brother and the team's center, Bob, as a dominant frontcourt duo.

For his career, Jerry recorded 1,157 rebounds with a 14.6 per game average, which are second and first in school history, respectively (the leader in total rebounds, Anthony Bonner, played 54 more games than Koch). In the 1955 NBA draft, the Philadelphia Warriors selected him in the 10th round, although he never played professionally. In 1994, he was inducted into the Saint Louis University Hall of Fame.

== See also ==
- List of NCAA Division I men's basketball players with 30 or more rebounds in a game
