= Erwin Claggett =

American former basketball player

Personal information
- Born: June 3, 1973 (age 53) Venice, Illinois, U.S.
- Listed height: 6 ft 2 in (1.88 m)
- Listed weight: 185 lb (84 kg)

Career information
- High school: Venice (Venice, Illinois)
- College: Saint Louis (1991–1995)
- NBA draft: 1995: undrafted
- Position: Shooting guard / point guard

Career highlights
- 3× First-team All-Great Midwest (1993–1995); Great Midwest all-time scoring leader

Erwin Claggett (born June 3, 1973) is an American former basketball player best known for his collegiate career at Saint Louis University between 1991–92 and 1994–95. Claggett, a 6 ft 1 in (1.85 m) combo guard, played for the Billikens for four seasons and scored 1,910 points. He became the Great Midwest Conference's all-time leading scorer, and because the conference disbanded in 1995, he will always hold the record.

He led the squad to a berth in the 1994 NCAA Tournament, where they lost in the opening round to Maryland. During his senior year, the Billikens earned another berth into the tournament, this time losing to Wake Forest in the round of 32.

After college, Claggett played professionally in various leagues overseas. He eventually returned home and got a job as a social studies teacher at a high school. He teaches history and coaches high school basketball at St. Louis University High School. In 2001, he was inducted into the Saint Louis University Athletic Hall of Fame.

== See also ==
- List of NCAA Division I men's basketball career scoring leaders
