= Rich Parks =

American basketball player

Personal information
- Born: October 28, 1943
- Died: August 19, 1978 (aged 34) St. Louis, Missouri, U.S.
- Listed height: 6 ft 7 in (2.01 m)
- Listed weight: 235 lb (107 kg)

Career information
- High school: Sumner (St. Louis, Missouri)
- College: Saint Louis (1963–1966)
- NBA draft: 1966: 5th round, 47th overall pick
- Drafted by: Cincinnati Royals
- Position: Small forward
- Number: 45, 50

Career history
- 1967–1968: Pittsburgh Pipers

Career highlights
- First-team All-MVC (1966)
- Stats at Basketball Reference

Richard E. Parks (October 28, 1943 – August 19, 1978) was an American basketball player. He played college basketball for the Saint Louis Billikens.

A 6'7" forward, Parks played college basketball at Saint Louis University.

Parks was drafted by the Cincinnati Royals in the fifth round (47th pick overall) of the 1966 NBA draft.

Parks played on the 1967–68 Pittsburgh Pipers team that won the 1968 ABA Championship.

Parks was shot and killed at a bar in St. Louis on August 19, 1978, at age 34.
