= Mike McCall Jr. =

American basketball player (born 1991)

Deportivo Quevedo
- Position: Point guard
- League: Liga Ecuatoriana de Baloncesto

Personal information
- Born: June 16, 1991 (age 35) Chicago, Illinois, U.S.
- Listed height: 6 ft 0 in (1.83 m)
- Listed weight: 180 lb (82 kg)

Career information
- High school: Foreman (Chicago, Illinois)
- College: Saint Louis (2010–2014)
- NBA draft: 2014: undrafted
- Playing career: 2014–present

Career history
- 2014–2015: Iowa Energy
- 2015–present: Deportivo Quevedo

Mike McCall Jr. (born June 16, 1991) is an American professional basketball player who currently plays for Deportivo Quevedo of the Liga Ecuatoriana de Baloncesto (LEB). He played college basketball for Saint Louis University (SLU) where he helped the Billikens win the Atlantic 10 Conference regular season title twice, the conference tournament, advanced to the NCAA Tournament three straight times, and set the school record for wins in a career at SLU.

== College career ==
=== Freshman year ===
During his freshman campaign as a Billikens, McCall averaged 10.4 PPG, 2.1 RPG, and 3 APG while shooting 42.8% from the field and 36.6% from three-point range. He led the Billikens in scoring, the first freshman to do this since Larry Hughes.

=== Sophomore year ===
As a sophomore, McCall averaged 7.0 PPG, 1.8 RPG, and 2.2 APG while shooting 42.3% from the field and 34.8% from three-point range. He saw a drop in playing time with the return of Kwamain Mitchell after his year-long suspension for the previous season. The Billikens advanced to the 2012 NCAA Tournament where they defeated the Memphis Tigers in the first round. McCall recorded 2 points, 4 rebounds and 4 assists in the win. In the second round, the Billikens almost upset No. 1 seeded Michigan State but lost in the dying minutes. McCall had 6 points, 4 rebounds and 2 assists in the loss.

=== Junior year ===
As a junior, McCall became an every game starter and averaged 9.3 points, 2.5 rebounds, 2.7 assists while shooting 40.5% from the field and 40.2% from three-point range. McCall started every game for the Billikens who won the Atlantic 10 Conference Regular Season Title and Tournament while earning a No. 4 seed in the NCAA Tournament. In the two NCAA Tournament Games, McCall had 4 points and 2 rebounds vs. New Mexico State, and had 3 rebounds and 3 assists against Oregon.

=== Senior year ===
As a senior, McCall came into the season 122 points away from 1,000 career points and eventually earned his 1,000th point midway through the season. He averaged 9.8 points, 3.8 rebounds, and 2.4 assists while starting every game for the Billikens. The Billikens won the conference regular season crown again and advanced to the NCAA Tournament as a No. 5 seed. The Billikens rallied from down 17 in the second half to defeat the NC State Wolfpack in overtime. McCall had 12 points, 6 rebounds, and 6 assists, his best NCAA Tournament game. However, the Billikens lost to No. 4 seeded Louisville Cardinals. McCall had 4 points, 1 rebound, and 2 assists in his final college basketball game.

== Professional career ==
On November 1, 2014, McCall was selected by the Iowa Energy in the third round of the 2014 NBA Development League Draft. However, he played sparingly, managing to average just 2.9 points and 1.2 assists in 29 games.

On September 1, 2015, McCall signed with Deportivo Quevedo of the Liga Ecuatoriana de Baloncesto.
