= Jordair Jett =

American basketball player (born 1991)

Personal information
- Born: August 17, 1991 (age 35)
- Listed height: 6 ft 1 in (1.85 m)
- Listed weight: 215 lb (98 kg)

Career information
- High school: Saint Agnes (Saint Paul, Minnesota); Saint Bernard's (Saint Paul, Minnesota); Notre Dame Prep (Fitchburg, Massachusetts)
- College: Saint Louis (2010–2014)
- NBA draft: 2014: undrafted
- Playing career: 2015–2019
- Position: Point guard

Career history
- 2015–2016: Townsville Crocodiles
- 2016: Southland Sharks
- 2018: Townsville Heat
- 2018–2019: Illawarra Hawks
- 2019: Nelson Giants

Career highlights
- QBL champion (2018); Atlantic 10 Player of the Year (2014); First-team All-Atlantic 10 (2014); Third-team All-Atlantic 10 (2013); 3× Atlantic 10 All-Defensive Team (2012–2014)

Jordair Jett (born August 17, 1991) is an American former professional basketball player. He played college basketball for the Saint Louis Billikens where he was named Atlantic 10 Conference Player of the Year in 2014, becoming the school's first conference player of the year since 1980.

== Early life ==
Jett grew up in Saint Paul, Minnesota and was raised by his single mother in a home with a sister, brother and two cousins Jett considers brothers. His mother, a track star, used to take him to the park where he'd watch his brother and cousins play basketball and football. By the age of nine, Jett was playing organized basketball.

== High school career ==
For his first two years of high school, Jett attended Saint Agnes High School in Saint Paul, Minnesota where he played basketball and football. In 2007, he transferred to Saint Bernard's High School, where as a senior in 2008–09, he averaged 20 points, five assists and five steals per game. He then moved to Notre Dame Prep in Fitchburg, Massachusetts for a prep season in 2009–10. There, he played for coach Ryan Hurd, and averaged a team-high 14 points to go with seven rebounds and five assists. He helped the Crusaders to a 27–7 record and the No. 4 seed at the 2010 National Prep Championship tournament.

== College career ==
As a freshman at Saint Louis in 2010–11, Jett played in all 31 games and drew 10 starting assignments, and led the team with 44 steals, which is second most all-time at SLU by a freshman (Larry Hughes, 69). He also averaged 7.5 points and 3.1 assists per game.

As a sophomore in 2011–12, Jett was named to the A-10 All-Defensive team and appeared in all 34 contests. He helped the Billikens reach the third round of the 2012 NCAA tournament. He averaged 6.5 points and 2.1 assists per game.

As a junior in 2012–13, Jett earned third-team All-Conference selection and was named to the A-10 All-Defensive team for the second year in a row. He helped the Billikens win the Atlantic 10 regular season and 2013 Atlantic 10 men's basketball tournament championship. The Billikens reached the third round of the 2013 NCAA tournament. He appeared in all 35 contests and started in nine of the first 11 games, then came off the bench in the rest. He averaged 9.0 points per game and led the Billikens with 112 assists.

As a senior in 2013–14, Jett was named the Atlantic 10 Conference Player of the Year, and was also voted to A-10 All-Defensive team, first-team All-Conference and NABC first-team All-District selection. The Billikens won the Atlantic 10 regular season championship and reached the third round of the 2014 NCAA tournament. He led Billikens in assists (164), steals (51) and was second in scoring (13.9 ppg). Jett ended his career ranking third all-time at SLU in assists (422) and steals (174) – his 164 assists as a senior was third all-time in a single season at SLU. He reached the 1,000 point mark for his career and is ranked 18th all-time in scoring at SLU with 1,239 points. In January 2015, he was one of 16 players named to the Saint Louis Billikens' All-Century Team.

== Professional career ==
After graduating from college, an off-season knee injury requiring surgery undermined Jett's plans for several NBA workouts, ultimately leading him back to Saint Louis for his rehabilitation and to work out with the team. In July 2015, Jett played for a team made up of Saint Louis alumni in the second annual The Basketball Tournament, with one of his teammates being Brian Conklin, of whom Jett played alongside at Saint Louis between 2010 and 2012. Conklin encouraged Jett to inquire about joining his team in Australia, the Townsville Crocodiles.

Later that month, on July 31, Jett signed with the Townsville Crocodiles for the 2015–16 NBL season. On November 4, 2015, he scored a season-high 24 points in an 89–77 win over the Perth Wildcats. He topped his season high two times throughout the season, scoring 26 points on December 2 against the Cairns Taipans, and 29 points on January 16 against the Adelaide 36ers. The Crocodiles finished the season in seventh place with an 11–17 record. Jett appeared in all 28 games for the Crocodiles in 2015–16, averaging 15.4 points, 3.6 rebounds, 3.3 assists and 1.1 steals per game. At the annual club awards night, he won the Kevin Sugars Medal for being named MVP, in addition to being named the club's Defensive Player of the Year.

On February 5, 2016, Jett signed with the Southland Sharks for the 2016 New Zealand NBL season. He was named back-to-back Player of the Week for Rounds 3 and 4 before missing the rest of the season with a knee injury. In six games for the Sharks, he averaged 22.8 points, 6.0 rebounds, 5.3 assists, 2.5 steals and 1.0 blocks per game.

In March 2018, Jett returned to Australia and signed with the Townsville Heat of the Queensland Basketball League. In August 2018, he helped the Heat win the QBL Championship with a 2–0 sweep of the Cairns Marlins in the grand final series. In 19 games, he averaged 15.6 points, 5.3 rebounds, 4.5 assists and 1.4 steals per game.

On June 28, 2018, Jett signed with the Illawarra Hawks for the 2018–19 NBL season, returning to the league for a second stint. He appeared in all 28 games for the Hawks, averaging 12.0 points, 2.9 rebounds, 2.8 assists and 1.6 steals per game.

On April 3, 2019, Jett signed with the Nelson Giants for the 2019 New Zealand NBL season, returning to the league for a second stint. He appeared in all 18 games for the Giants, averaging 18.3 points, 4.1 rebounds, 5.2 assists and 1.7 steals per game.
