= Hasahn French =

American basketball player (born 1998)

Shandong Honey Badger
- Position: Power forward
- League: National Basketball League

Personal information
- Born: March 9, 1998 (age 28) Middletown, New York, U.S.
- Listed height: 6 ft 7 in (2.01 m)
- Listed weight: 270 lb (122 kg)

Career information
- High school: Middletown (Middletown, New York); Springfield Commonwealth Academy (Springfield, Massachusetts)
- College: Saint Louis (2017–2021)
- NBA draft: 2021: undrafted
- Playing career: 2021–present

Career history
- 2021–2022: Krka
- 2022–2023: Newcastle Eagles
- 2024–2025: Golden Eagle Ylli
- 2025–present: Shandong Honey Badger

Career highlights
- Second-team All-Atlantic 10 (2020); Third-team All-Atlantic 10 (2019); 2x Atlantic 10 All-Defensive Team (2019, 2020); Atlantic 10 All-Rookie Team (2018)

Hasahn Sadeek French (born March 9, 1998) is an American professional basketball player for Shandong Honey Badger of the National Basketball League (NBL). He played college basketball for the Saint Louis Billikens.

== High school career ==
French grew up in Middletown, New York and did not play organized basketball until eighth grade, instead playing running back on youth league football teams. After a five-inch growth spurt, he was noticed by Middletown High School coach Jim Kelly and joined the team in eighth grade, helping the team become the Class AA section 9 champions. French transferred to Springfield Commonwealth Academy following his freshman year. As a senior, he had 38 points, 18 rebounds and 10 assists against Brewster Academy. He led the team to winning the Hoophall Classic, defeating Cushing Academy 61–56. French finished with 10 points and 17 rebounds and was named MVP. A four-star recruit, French committed to playing college basketball for Saint Louis over UMass and UNLV.

== College career ==
As a freshman, French averaged 9.3 points and 7.1 rebounds per game and set a Saint Louis freshman record with 59 blocked shots. French was named to the Atlantic 10 All-Rookie Team. In the first round of the 2019 Atlantic 10 Tournament, French scored 22 points and had 12 rebounds in a win over Richmond. As a sophomore, French averaged 9.3 points, 8.4 rebounds, and 1.8 blocks per game on a team that finished 23–13 and reached the NCAA Tournament. He was named to the Third Team All-Atlantic 10 as well as the Defensive Team.

On November 23, 2019, French scored 21 points and pulled down an Atlantic 10 record-tying 24 rebounds in a 60–55 win against Belmont. He was named to the midseason Karl Malone Award watchlist. As a junior, French averaged 12.4 points, 10.4 rebounds, 2.3 assists and 2.6 blocks per game. He led the conference in rebounding and became Saint Louis's all-time leader in blocks. French was named to the Second Team All-Atlantic 10 as well as the Defensive Team. Following the season, he declared for the 2020 NBA draft. On June 3, French withdrew from the draft and opted to return for his senior season. He averaged 9.2 points and 7.4 rebounds per game as a senior.

== Professional career ==
On June 25, 2021, French reportedly signed his first professional contract with Lavrio of the Greek Basket League. However, the transfer never fully materialized. On August 19, he signed with Krka of the Slovenian League.

For the 2022–23 season, French joined the Raptors 905 of the NBA G League, however he did not make the final roster. On 2 December 2022, French was announced as a new signing for the Newcastle Eagles of the British Basketball League.

On October 28, 2024, French joined the Delaware Blue Coats, but was waived on November 4.

== Career statistics ==
Legend
GP	Games played	GS	Games started	MPG	Minutes per game
FG%	Field goal percentage	3P%	3-point field goal percentage	FT%	Free throw percentage
RPG	Rebounds per game	APG	Assists per game	SPG	Steals per game
BPG	Blocks per game	PPG	Points per game	**Bold**	Career high

=== College ===
Year	Team	GP	GS	MPG	FG%	3P%	FT%	RPG	APG	SPG	BPG	PPG
2017–18	Saint Louis	32	32	30.2	**.535**	.000	**.364**	7.1	1.5	.8	1.8	9.3
2018–19	Saint Louis	**36**	**35**	30.6	.492	–	.349	8.4	1.5	**1.0**	1.8	9.3
2019–20	Saint Louis	30	30	**31.9**	.521	–	.329	**10.4**	2.3	**1.0**	**2.6**	**12.4**
2020–21	Saint Louis	19	19	25.0	.533	–	.326	7.4	**2.4**	.7	1.4	9.2
Career		117	116	29.9	.517	.000	.343	8.4	1.9	.9	1.9	10.1
