= David Burns (basketball) =

American basketball player (1958–2025)

Personal information
- Born: July 3, 1958 Dallas, Texas, U.S.
- Died: March 11, 2025 (aged 66)
- Listed height: 6 ft 2 in (1.88 m)
- Listed weight: 180 lb (82 kg)

Career information
- High school: South Oak Cliff (Dallas, Texas)
- College: Navarro College (1977–1979); Saint Louis (1979–1981)
- NBA draft: 1981: 3rd round, 49th overall pick
- Drafted by: New Jersey Nets
- Position: Guard
- Number: 21, 5

Career history
- 1981: New Jersey Nets
- 1981: Denver Nuggets
- 1982–1983: Ohio Mixers

Career highlights
- CBA All-Defensive Second Team (1983); Metro Conference co-Player of the Year (1981); First-team All-Metro Conference (1981)
- Stats at NBA.com
- Stats at Basketball Reference

David Earl Burns (July 3, 1958 – March 11, 2025) was an American professional basketball player. He played college basketball for Navarro College and Saint Louis.

He was raised in Dallas, Texas, and attended South Oak Cliff High School. After two years at Navarro Junior College, Burns transferred to Saint Louis University. In his two years at SLU, he averaged 19.4 and 21.4 points per game. He was conference co-MVP during his senior year.

Burns was selected by the NBA’s New Jersey Nets in the 3rd round (49th pick overall) of the 1981 NBA draft. He split the 1981–82 season with the Nets and Denver Nuggets, playing a total of 9 games.

Burns played for the Ohio Mixers in the Continental Basketball Association (CBA) during the 1982–83 season and was selected to the CBA All-Defensive Second Team.

Burns was inducted to the Navarro College athletic hall of fame in 2021.

Burns died on March 11, 2025, at the age of 66. He was buried at Chatfield Cemetery in Chatfield, Texas.

== Career statistics ==
Legend
GP	Games played	GS	Games started	MPG	Minutes per game
FG%	Field goal percentage	3P%	3-point field goal percentage	FT%	Free throw percentage
RPG	Rebounds per game	APG	Assists per game	SPG	Steals per game
BPG	Blocks per game	PPG	Points per game	**Bold**	Career high

=== NBA ===
==== Regular season ====
Year	Team	GP	GS	MPG	FG%	3P%	FT%	RPG	APG	SPG	BPG	PPG
1981–82	New Jersey	3	0	**11.3**	.400	–	.500	**.7**	1.3	**.3**	.0	2.3
1981–82	Denver	**6**	**1**	8.8	**.455**	–	**.667**	.5	**1.8**	**.3**	.0	**2.7**
Career		9	1	9.7	.438	–	.600	.6	1.7	.3	.0	2.6
