= Saint Agnes School (Saint Paul, Minnesota) =

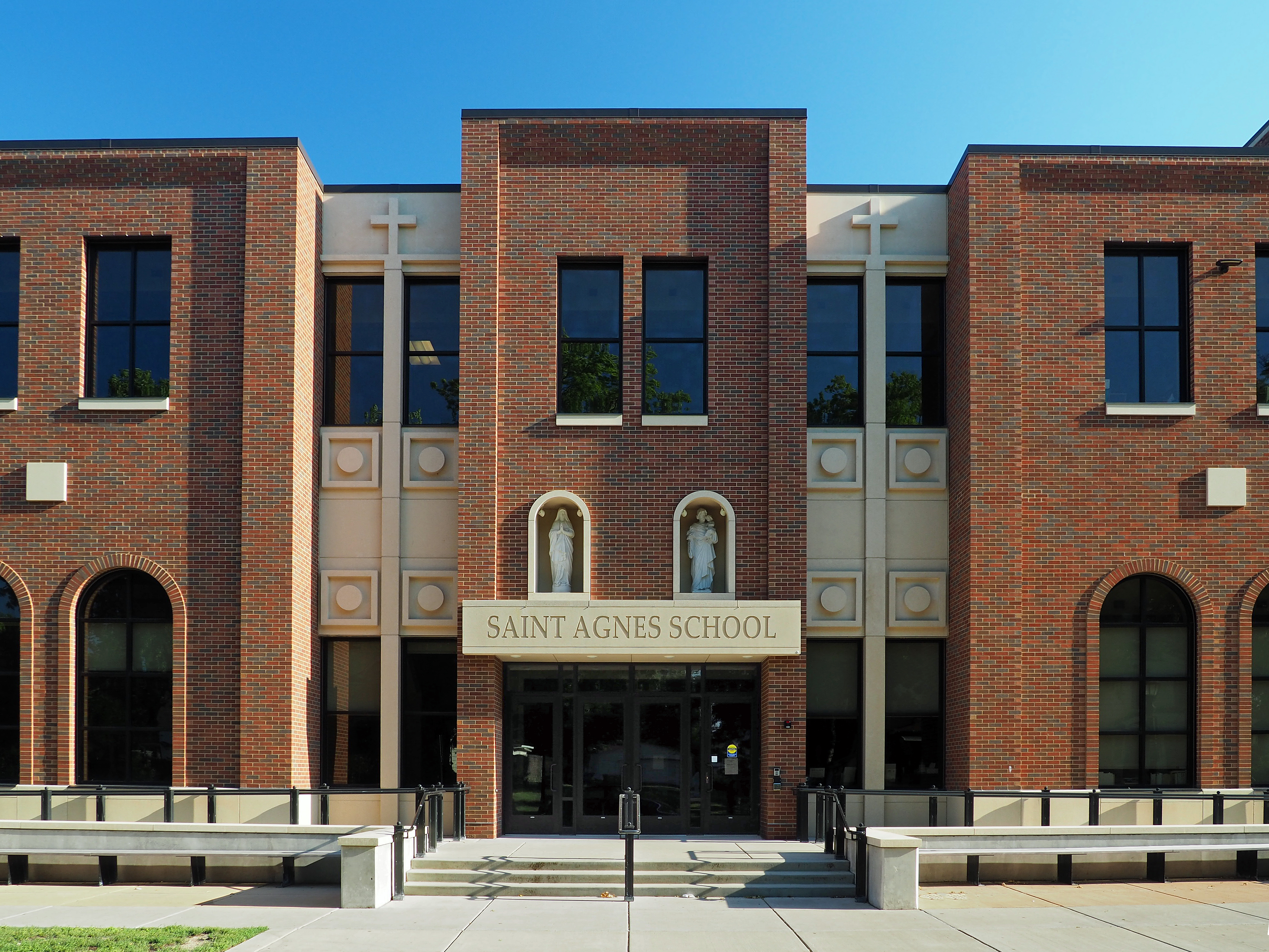
- Saint Agnes School's Main Entrance

Location
- 530 Lafond Avenue; Saint Paul, (Ramsey County), Minnesota 55103-1693; United States; 44°57′36″N 93°7′21″W

Information
- School type: Private Parochial
- Motto: Forming Hearts & Minds in Faith, Reason, and Virtue
- Religious affiliation: Roman Catholic
- Denomination: Roman Catholic
- Established: 1888
- Status: Active
- School district: Archdiocese of Saint Paul and Minneapolis
- Superintendent: John L. Ubel
- Headmaster: Kevin Ferdinandt
- Chaplain: Paul Baker
- Teaching staff: 55
- Grades: PK-12
- Gender: Coeducational
  - Grade 9: 90
  - Grade 10: 87
  - Grade 11: 90
  - Grade 12: 87
- Average class size: 22
- Student to teacher ratio: 12:1 (7-12)
- Hours in school day: 7:55 A.M. - 2:45 P.M.
- Colors: Red and White
- Song: Aggie Rouser
- Fight song: Aggie Rouser
- Athletics conference: Skyline Conference
- Sports: Girls and Boys Soccer, Volleyball, Football, Cross Country, Cheerleading, Wrestling, Girls and Boys Basketball, Softball, Baseball and Track and Field
- Mascot: Aggie Bull
- Team name: Aggies
- Rival: Concordia Academy (Minnesota)
- Yearbook: The Palm
- Website: www.saintagnesschool.org

Saint Agnes School is a Private, Roman Catholic PreK-12 School in the Frogtown Neighborhood of Saint Paul, Minnesota. It is located in the Archdiocese of Saint Paul and Minneapolis, and is affiliated with the Church of St. Agnes in Saint Paul. Together, the church and school form the Saint Agnes Parish.

== History ==
Right after the construction of the Church of Saint Agnes by Austrian Immigrants in 1887, Saint Agnes School was established in 1888 as a Catholic and Parochial school. Students were taught by the School Sisters of Notre Dame. As of today (2025), the school stands as the only Catholic and Parochial school left in Frogtown, and it takes students from Pre-Kindergarten all the way until 12th Grade in a classical Liberal Arts Education.

=== Major financial gifts ===
In 2007, facing declining enrollment and financial strain, Saint Agnes was under pressure to close down. That year, the school undertook major fundraising efforts and brought in donations amounting to over $3 million to help the school pay its debts, renovate the aging building, and purchase updated classroom technology. This effort marked a turnaround for the school, as it created a balanced budget and grew enrollment by 30% in the following years. A large portion of this fundraising came from local philanthropist John Nasseff. In 2014, Nasseff went on to donate an additional $10 million St. Agnes, the largest single gift ever to a Catholic school in the Archdiocese of Saint Paul and Minneapolis, to help build a new activities center.

== Academics ==
Saint Agnes High School is fully accredited by the National Catholic Education Association, is a member of The National Association of Private Catholic and Independent Schools, is a part of the Catholic Schools of the Archdiocese of Saint Paul and Minneapolis, is a premier member of the Institute for Catholic Liberal Education, had been awarded the Catholic Education Honor Roll from 2018 to 2023, and is recommended and recognized by the Cardinal Newman Society's Newman Guide for Catholic Education.

== Fine arts ==
Saint Agnes has a long-standing choral tradition that coincides with its Catholic identity. The Saint Agnes Concert Chorale performs several concerts a year and tours extensively. It also participates in state competitions regularly receiving superior ratings. On almost a yearly basis, singers from the school are selected to participate in the All-State Choirs.

The Saint Agnes School band program cultivates independent musicianship through various group and solo playing experiences. The curriculum, which includes listening, analyzing, composing, and performing, aims to develop musicians via creation, response, and performance evaluation. It serves students in grades 5–12, with band available to grades 5-8 and by audition for grades 9–12." The school also has individual Jazz Bands for different age groups, as well as Jazz Combos, in which a small group of students are selected to perform for special events

Saint Agnes provides classes for Studio Arts such as Drawing, Painting, Photojournalism, Portfolio Preparation, and Sculpturing. These classes seek to provide students to skills required to see the beauty of art and its techniques. Saint Agnes has a variety of ways to allow creative expression in the performing arts via its Drama Club, One-Act Plays, and the Spring Musical. Students in Grades 1 & 6 are also allowed to participate by the school's yearly rendition of the Passion Play.

== Athletics ==
Saint Agnes School is a school (Section 4A) that is mainly a member of the Skyline Conference of the Minnesota State High School League, but Saint Agnes does participate in other conferences of MSHSL. Saint Agnes collaborates with other schools for less common sports such as hockey, swimming, alpine skiing, tennis, and lacrosse.

Boy's athletics includes baseball, basketball, cross country, football, golf, hockey, soccer, track and field, and wrestling.

Girl's athletics includes basketball, cheerleading, cross country, golf, hockey, soccer, softball, track and field, and volleyball.

== State titles ==
- Basketball 1994
- Baseball 2001, 2011/2012
