= Springfield Commonwealth Academy =

Location
- 1 Ames Hill Dr; Hampden County; Springfield, Massachusetts 01105; United States of America
- 42°05′56.35″N 72°34′34.28″W

Information
- School type: Private, Boarding, college preparatory school
- Established: 2012
- Staff: -
- Faculty: -
- Grades: 6–12
- Enrollment: -
- Average class size: -
- Student to teacher ratio: -
- Campus: Springfield
- Campus size: 15 acres
- Campus type: urban
- Colors: Black and White
- Sports: Basketball, Cross Country, Soccer, Crew, Ultimate Frisbee, Lacrosse, Tennis, Volleyball, Badminton, Softball, Baseball
- Team name: Tornadoes

Springfield Commonwealth Academy is a private middle- and high school in Springfield, Massachusetts.

== History ==
In December 2010, New York-based EC International announced it had acquired the Springfield-based MacDuffie School's name, mission, and intellectual property with plans to move the school to the former St. Hyacinth Seminary campus in Granby.

On June 1, 2011, five days before graduation in the MacDuffie school's final year in Springfield, the school's campus on Ames Hill Drive was devastated by a rare EF3 tornado that tore through several neighborhoods in the city and surrounding towns; caused more than $10 million in damage to the campus. Many student, faculty and staff were present on the campus at the time of the tornado and while there were no injuries, the campus was severely damaged with most of its trees uprooted as well as damage to buildings.

It was then when Holyoke-native John Foley agreed to buy the former MacDuffie property, with plans on making his own New England Prep school. While providing education to be available for the less affluent base. Foley, who runs an at-risk student program Project-13 in Holyoke has a history of working with at-risk middle-school children.

Springfield Commonwealth Academy opened in 2012, following a year of clean-up after the tornado devastated its campus.

== Facilities ==
=== Performance and Leisure facilities ===
- South Hall (1905) — Dining hall

=== Dormitories ===
- Annex (1963) — Residence Hall, with faculty housing
- Castle House (1910) — Residence Hall, with faculty housing
- Caswell House (1925) — Residence Hall, with faculty housing
- Ray House (1920) — Residence Hall, with faculty housing

== Athletics ==
The Springfield Commonwealth's athletic teams are known as the Tornadoes, and their colors are black and white.

== Trademark dispute ==
In June 2016, the Boston Globe reported that Commonwealth School sued Commonwealth Academy, a high school in Springfield, Massachusetts, over the use of the name "Commonwealth". Founded in 1957, the Boston school had trademarked "Commonwealth School" in 2012. The Springfield school is now known as Springfield Commonwealth Academy.
