= Cory Remekun =

American basketball player

Lille Métropole
- Position: Power forward /center
- League: Pro B

Personal information
- Born: July 15, 1991 (age 35) Mesquite, Texas
- Listed height: 6 ft 9 in (2.06 m)
- Listed weight: 235.4 lb (107 kg)

Career information
- High school: Mesquite (Mesquite, Texas)
- College: Saint Louis (2009–2013)
- NBA draft: 2013: undrafted
- Playing career: 2013–present

Career history
- 2013–2014: Dragons Rhöndorf
- 2014–2015: AE Nea Kifisia
- 2015: HKK Široki
- 2015–2016: Rogaška
- 2016–2017: Helios Suns Domžale
- 2017–present: Lille Métropole

Career highlights
- Slovenian League All-Star (2016)

Cory Remekun (born July 15, 1991) is an American professional basketball player for the Lille Métropole of the Pro B. He played college basketball for Saint Louis.
