= Anthony Bonner =

American basketball player (born 1968)

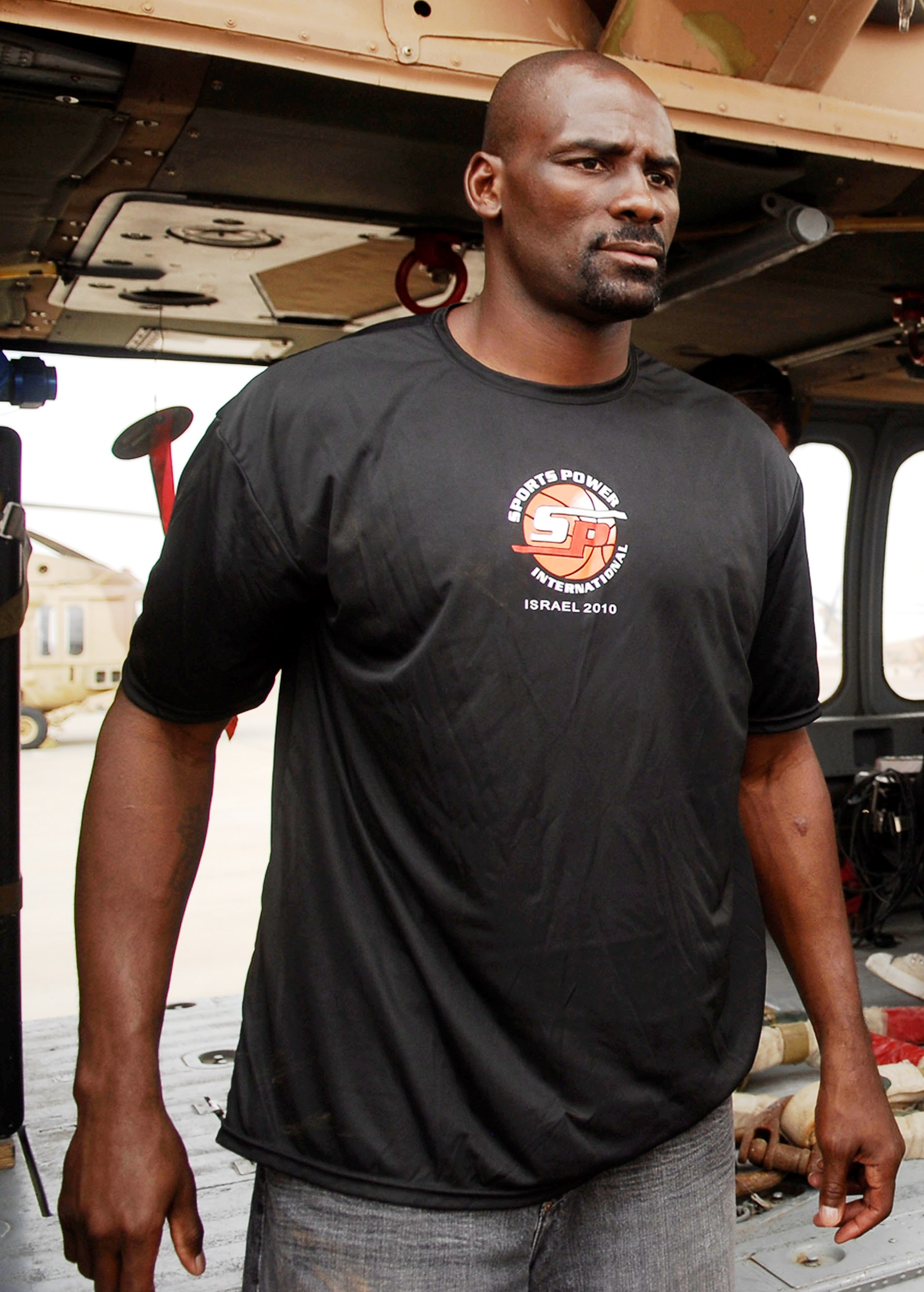
- Bonner in 2010

Personal information
- Born: June 8, 1968 (age 58) St. Louis, Missouri, U.S.
- Listed height: 6 ft 8 in (2.03 m)
- Listed weight: 215 lb (98 kg)

Career information
- High school: Vashon (St. Louis, Missouri)
- College: Saint Louis (1986–1990)
- NBA draft: 1990: 1st round, 23rd overall pick
- Drafted by: Sacramento Kings
- Playing career: 1990–2006
- Position: Power forward / small forward
- Number: 24, 4

Career history
- 1990–1993: Sacramento Kings
- 1993–1995: New York Knicks
- 1995–1996: Virtus Bologna
- 1996: Orlando Magic
- 1996–1997: PAOK Thessaloniki
- 1997–1998: Galatasaray
- 1998: Brujos de Guayama
- 1998–1999: Tau Cerámica
- 1999–2000: Breogán
- 2000: Brujos de Guayama
- 2000–2001: Breogán
- 2001–2002: UNICS Kazan
- 2002: Leones de Ponce
- 2002–2003: CB Valladolid
- 2003: Leones de Ponce
- 2003–2004: Great Lakes Storm
- 2004–2005: Leones de Ponce
- 2005–2006: Peñarol de Mar del Plata
- 2006: Brujos de Guayama
- 2006: Capitanes de Arecibo
- 2006: Maratonistas de Coamo

Career highlights
- Spanish Cup winner (1999); Greek League All-Star (1996 II); 2× BSN champion (2002, 2004); CBA All-Star Game (2004); NCAA rebounding leader (1990); 2× First-team All-MCC (1989, 1990); No. 34 jersey retired by Saint Louis Billikens; Mr. Show-Me Basketball (1986)

Career NBA statistics
- Points: 2,199 (6.9 ppg)
- Rebounds: 1,726 (5.4 rpg)
- Assists: 442 (1.4 apg)
- Stats at NBA.com
- Stats at Basketball Reference

Anthony Bonner (born June 8, 1968) is an American former professional basketball player. He played college basketball for Saint Louis.

== High school ==
Bonner attended Vashon High School in St. Louis, Missouri, where he also played basketball. During his senior season, he averaged 14.6 points and 16.8 rebounds and was named the 1986 Mr. Show-Me Basketball.

== College career ==
Bonner played college basketball at Saint Louis University. He was the Saint Louis Billikens' all-time leading scorer, with 1,972 points, until Gibson Jimerson surpassed him during the 2024–25 season.

== Professional career ==
Bonner was selected by the Sacramento Kings, in the first round (23rd overall pick) of the 1990 NBA draft. He played six seasons in the NBA, for the Kings, New York Knicks, and Orlando Magic. He averaged 6.9 points per game in his NBA career. In 2002, at the age of 34, he attempted an NBA comeback with the Utah Jazz; He was waived after appearing in seven preseason games, where he averaged 4.1 points per game.

He also played in Europe for several teams, including PAOK in Greece and Virtus Bologna in Italy.

== See also ==
- List of NCAA Division I men's basketball season rebounding leaders
