= Saint Louis Billikens men's basketball =

Intercollegiate men's basketball program representing Saint Louis University

| 2026–27 Saint Louis Billikens men's basketball team |
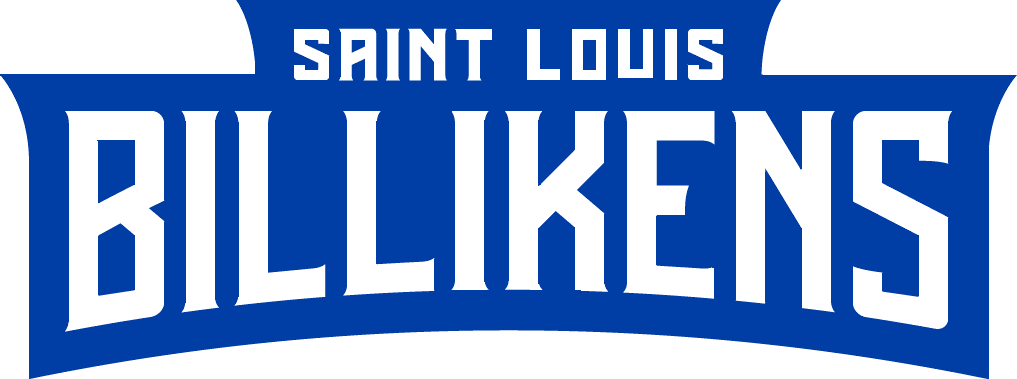
- University: Saint Louis University
- Head coach: Josh Schertz (3rd season)
- Location: St. Louis, Missouri
- Arena: Chaifetz Arena (capacity: 10,600)
- Conference: Atlantic 10
- Nickname: Billikens
- Colors: SLU blue and white
- Student section: SLUnatics

NCAA Division I tournament Elite Eight
- 1952
Other NCAA Division I tournament results
| Sweet Sixteen | 1952, 1957 |
| Appearances | 1952, 1957, 1994, 1995, 1998, 2000, 2012, 2013, 2014, 2019, 2026 |

NIT champions
- 1948

Conference tournament champions
- 2000, 2013, 2019

Conference regular-season champions
- 1947, 1952, 1955, 1957, 1971, 2013, 2014, 2026

Uniforms
| Home | Away |

The Saint Louis Billikens men's basketball team is the intercollegiate men's basketball program representing Saint Louis University. They compete in the Atlantic 10 Conference. The head coaching position is currently filled by Josh Schertz. Chaifetz Arena is home to the Billikens. The Billikens have reached the championship game of the NIT tournament four times and have won it once (1948). They have appeared in the NCAA Division I men's basketball tournament 11 times, most recently in 2026.

== History ==
=== Rick Majerus era ===
On April 27, 2007, Rick Majerus accepted the head coaching position. His tenure at SLU got off to a rocky start; in their first conference game, the Billikens set an NCAA Division I record for fewest points scored in a game in the modern era of college basketball, losing 49–20 to George Washington. However, as he had done previously at other programs, Majerus eventually made SLU a winning program. In 2012, he led the Billikens to their first NCAA Tournament in 12 years, and their first appearance in a major poll in 17 years.

On August 24, 2012, Majerus announced he would not coach the 2012–13 season due to serious heart problems. Jim Crews, one of his assistants, took over for him on a temporary basis for that season. On November 16, it was announced that Majerus was retiring when it was apparent that his heart condition would not improve enough to allow him to return.

Majerus compiled a 95–69 (.579) record at St. Louis University and retired with an overall NCAA record of 517–215 (.706).

=== Jim Crews era ===
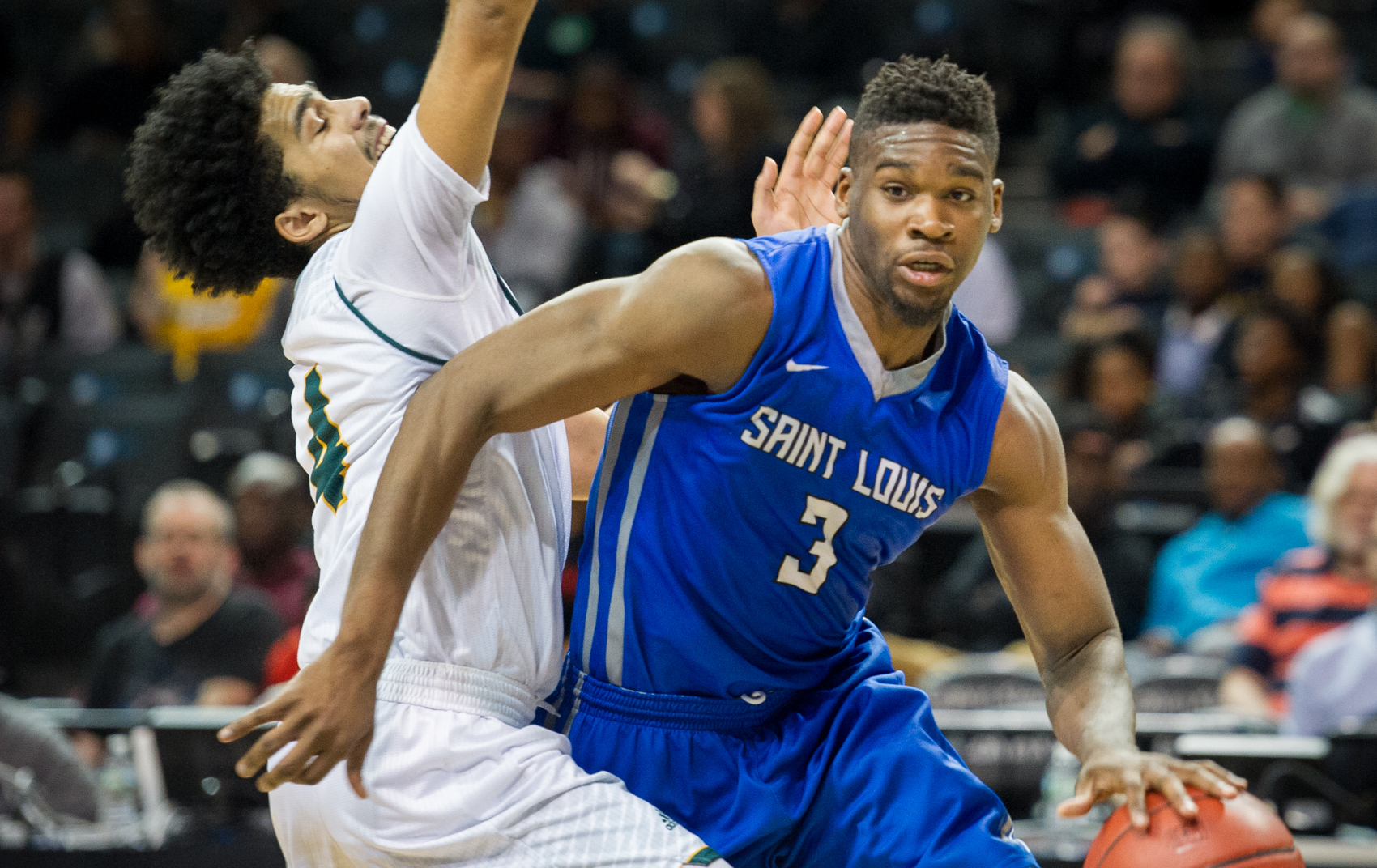
A Billikens men's basketball player dribbles the ball during the 2016 Atlantic 10 men's basketball tournament

Jim Crews was promoted to head coach after serving on an interim basis following the health concerns and eventual death of Majerus. He was on Majerus' staff since 2011. After leading the Billikens to a school-record 28 wins, Crews was formally named SLU's 25th head coach on April 12, 2013. He was fired after the 2016 Atlantic 10 tournament resulted in the elimination of the Billikens and marked the end of two 11–21 Billikens seasons. Crews was paid a $1.86 million buyout in 2016-17, according to tax forms.

=== Travis Ford era ===
On March 30, 2016, Saint Louis University announced that Travis Ford has been hired as the head basketball coach. He inherited a Billikens team that had gone a disappointing 11–21 each of the previous two seasons under Jim Crews. Due to a lack of talent returning from the previous regime, SLU was predicted to finish last in the Atlantic 10 conference during the 2016–17 season. Basketball statistician Ken Pomeroy also predicted the Billikens as the team most likely to go winless during its conference schedule. Ford led the Billikens to six Atlantic 10 conference wins and a 12–21 overall record. The Billikens and Ford gained the attention of national news in January 2024 after it was discovered that Ford's son had created burner Twitter accounts to defend his father, as fans were calling for his firing. Ford and SLU parted ways following the 2023-24 season.

=== Josh Schertz era ===
On April 6, 2024, it was announced that Josh Schertz had been hired as the head coach for the St. Louis Billikens, replacing Ford. While Schertz's first season in charge was marked by frustrations stemming from an injury from star transfer forward Robbie Avila, the 2025-26 season saw a return to prominence for the Billikens with a school-record 29 wins, the Atlantic 10 regular-season championship, and both their first national ranking and NCAA Tournament win since 2014.

== Postseason appearances ==
=== NCAA tournament results ===
The Billikens have appeared in 11 NCAA Tournaments. Their combined record is 7–11.

| Year | Seed | Round | Opponent | Result |
|---|---|---|---|---|
| 1952 | | Sweet Sixteen; Elite Eight | New Mexico State; Kansas | W 62–53; L 55–74 |
| 1957 | | Sweet Sixteen; Regional 3rd Place Game | Oklahoma City; SMU | L 66–75; L 68–78 |
| 1994 | #7 | First Round | #10 Maryland | L 66–74 |
| 1995 | #9 | First Round; Second Round | #8 Minnesota #1 Wake Forest | W 64–61^{OT} L 59–64 |
| 1998 | #10 | First Round; Second Round | #7 UMass #2 Kentucky | W 51–46; L 61–88 |
| 2000 | #9 | First Round | #8 Utah | L 45–48 |
| 2012 | #9 | First Round; Second Round | #8 Memphis #1 Michigan State | W 61–54; L 61–65 |
| 2013 | #4 | First Round; Second Round | #13 New Mexico State #12 Oregon | W 64–44; L 57–74 |
| 2014 | #5 | First Round; Second Round | #12 NC State #4 Louisville | W 83–80^{OT} L 51–66 |
| 2019 | #13 | First Round | #4 Virginia Tech | L 52–66 |
| 2026 | #9 | First Round; Second Round | #8 Georgia #1 Michigan | W 102–77; L 72–95 |

=== NIT results ===
The Billikens have appeared in 21 National Invitation Tournaments (NIT). Their combined record is 18–20. They were NIT champions in 1948 and runner-up in 1961, 1989, and 1990.

| Year | Round | Opponent | Result |
|---|---|---|---|
| 1948 | Quarterfinals; Semifinals; Final | Bowling Green; Western Kentucky; NYU | W 69–53; W 60–53; W 65–52 |
| 1949 | Quarterfinals | Bowling Green | L 74–80 |
| 1951 | First Round; Quarterfinals | La Salle; BYU | W 73–61; L 68–75 |
| 1952 | Quarterfinals | Dayton | L 58–68 |
| 1953 | First Round | St. John's | L 66–81 |
| 1955 | First Round; Quarterfinals | Connecticut; Dayton | W 110–103; L 81–97 |
| 1956 | First Round | Xavier | L 80–84 |
| 1959 | Quarterfinals | Providence | L 72–75 |
| 1960 | Quarterfinals | Providence | L 53–64 |
| 1961 | First Round; Quarterfinals; Semifinals; Final | Miami (FL); Colorado State; Dayton; Providence | W 58–56; W 59–53; W 67–60; L 59–62 |
| 1963 | Quarterfinals | Marquette | L 49–84 |
| 1965 | First Round | Army | L 66–70 |
| 1987 | First Round; Second Round | Saint Peter's; Southern Miss | W 76–60; L 78–83 |
| 1989 | First Round; Second Round; Quarterfinals; Semifinals; Final | Southern Illinois; Wisconsin; New Mexico; Michigan State; St. John's | W 87–54; W 73–68; W 66–65; W 74–64; L 65–73 |
| 1990 | First Round; Second Round; Quarterfinals; Semifinals; Final | Kent State; Green Bay; DePaul; New Mexico; Vanderbilt | W 85–74; W 58–54; W 54–47; W 80–73; L 72–74 |
| 1996 | First Round | Minnesota | L 52–68 |
| 2003 | First Round | Minnesota | L 52–62 |
| 2004 | First Round; Second Round | Iowa; Notre Dame | W 70–69; L 66–77 |
| 2021 | First Round | Mississippi State | L 68–74 |
| 2022 | First Round | Northern Iowa | L 68–80 |
| 2025 | First Round | Arkansas State | L 78–103 |

=== CBI results ===
The Billikens have appeared in one College Basketball Invitational (CBI). Their record is 3–2 and they were the CBI runner-up in their only appearance.

| Year | Round | Opponent | Result |
|---|---|---|---|
| 2010 | First Round; Quarterfinals; Semifinals; Finals Game 1 Finals Game 2 | Indiana State; Green Bay; Princeton; VCU; VCU | W 63–54; W 68–62 ^{2OT} W 69–59; L 56–68; L 65–71 |

== Individual honors ==
=== Retired numbers ===
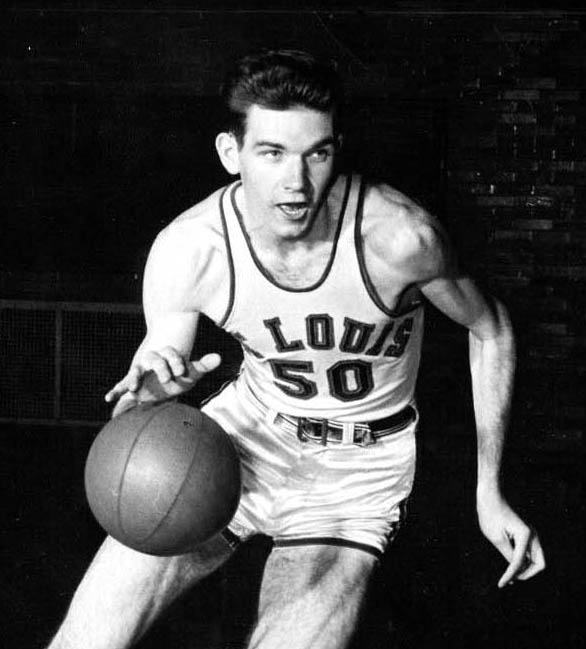
Ed Macauley is the only Billiken whose number (#50) is retired

Saint Louis Billikens retired numbers
| No. | Player | Pos. | Career | Ref. |
| 50 | Ed Macauley | C / PF | 1945–1949 | |

=== Honored jerseys ===
Jerseys were honored/retired, but numbers remained active and can be chosen by future players

| No. | Player | Pos. | Career | Ref. |
|---|---|---|---|---|
| 24 | Dick Boushka | F | 1951–1955 | |
| 34 | Anthony Bonner | PF / SF | 1986–1990 | |
| 43 | Bob Ferry | PF / C | 1956–1959 | |

== Home courts ==
- 1915, 1917 Muegge's Gymnasium (Grand Ave. and Hickory St.)
- 1919–1920 Rock Springs Turner Hall (Boyle Ave. and Chouteau Ave.)
- 1920–1921 College Hall
- 1921–1922 First Regiment Armory and Macabee's Hall (911 Vandeventer Ave.)
- 1922–1923 First Regiment Armory and Battery A Armory (1 game)
- 1923–1924 First Regiment Armory
- 1924–1925 SLUH Gymnasium
- 1925–1926 First Regiment Armory, SLUH Gymnasium and St. Louis Coliseum
- 1926–1945 St. Louis University Gymnasium (West Pine Gym)
- 1945–1968 Kiel Auditorium
- 1968–1973 St. Louis Arena
- 1973–1991 Kiel Auditorium
- 1991–1994 St. Louis Arena
- 1994–2008 Scottrade Center (Kiel Center, Savvis Center)
- 2008–present Chaifetz Arena

== Billikens in the pros ==
| Player | Attended SLU | Current team | Years played professionally |
|---|---|---|---|
| Marque Perry | 1999–2003 | BG Göttingen | 2003–2015 |
| Itzik Ohanon | 2002–2005 | Ironi Ramat Gan | 1999–2011 |
| Ian Vouyoukas | 2003–2007 | Ionikos Nikaias B.C. | 2007–present |
| Marcus Relphorde | 2007–2008 | Poiters | 2011–present |
| Kevin Lisch | 2005–2009 | Sydney Kings | 2009–2020 |
| Brian Conklin | 2008–2012 | Yalovaspor BK | 2012–present |
| Cory Remekun | 2009–2013 | Caen Basket Calvados | 2013–2019 |
| Cody Ellis | 2009–2013 | Illawarra Hawks | 2013–2018 |
| Dwayne Evans | 2010–2014 | Ryukyu Golden Kings | 2014–present |
| Jordair Jett | 2010–2014 | Nelson Giants | 2014–2019 |
| Mike McCall Jr. | 2010–2014 | Cheshire Phoenix | 2014–present |
| Rob Loe | 2010–2014 | New Zealand Breakers | 2014–present |
| Javon Bess | 2017–2019 | Tindastóll | 2019–present |
| Tramaine Isabell | 2018–2019 | KK Dubrava | 2019–2022 |
| Jordan Goodwin | 2017–2021 | Phoenix Suns | 2021–present |
| Hasahn French | 2017–2021 | Krka | 2021–present |

Billikens in the NBA and ABA
| Player | Attended SLU | Team(s) | Year(s) played |
|---|---|---|---|
| D.C. Wilcutt | 1944–1948 | St. Louis Bombers | 1949–1950 |
| Marv Schatzman | 1947–1949 | Baltimore Bullets | 1950 |
| Ed "Easy Ed" Macauley | 1945–1949 | St. Louis Bombers, Boston Celtics, St. Louis Hawks | 1950–1959 |
| Bevo Nordmann | 1958–1961 | Cincinnati Royals, St. Louis Hawks, New York Knicks, Boston Celtics | 1962–1965 |
| Richard Parks | 1964–1966 | Pittsburgh Pipers | 1968 |
| Bob Ferry | 1956–1959 | St. Louis Hawks, Detroit Pistons, Baltimore Bullets | 1960–1969 |
| Don Dee | 1962–1964 | Indiana Pacers | 1968–1969 |
| Barry Orms | 1965–1968 | Baltimore Bullets, Indiana Pacers, Pittsburgh Pipers | 1969–1970 |
| Rich Niemann | 1965–1968 | Detroit Pistons, Milwaukee Bucks, Boston Celtics, Carolina Cougars, The Floridians, Dallas Chaparrals | 1969–1972 |
| Gene Moore | 1965–1968 | Kentucky Colonels, Dallas Chaparrals, New York Nets, San Diego Conquistadors, Spirits of St. Louis | 1969–1975 |
| Harry Rogers | 1970–1973 | Spirits of St. Louis | 1976 |
| Robin Jones | 1972–1975 | Portland Trail Blazers, Houston Rockets | 1977–1978 |
| David Burns | 1979–1981 | New Jersey Nets, Denver Nuggets | 1982 |
| Anthony Bonner | 1986–1990 | Sacramento Kings, New York Knicks, Orlando Magic | 1991–1996 |
| Larry Hughes | 1997–1998 | Philadelphia 76ers, Golden State Warriors, Washington Wizards, Cleveland Cavaliers, Chicago Bulls, New York Knicks, Charlotte Bobcats, Orlando Magic | 1999–2012 |
| Willie Reed | 2008–2010 | Brooklyn Nets, Miami Heat, Los Angeles Clippers, Detroit Pistons | 2015–2018 |
| Jordan Goodwin | 2017-2021 | Washington Wizards, Phoenix Suns, Memphis Grizzlies, Los Angeles Lakers | 2021-present |

== Career statistical leaders ==
=== Points ===
- 1) 1,972 – Anthony Bonner, 6' 8" F, 1986–1990
- 2) 1,910 – Erwin Claggett, 6' 1" G, 1991–1995
- 3) 1,880 – Roland Gray, 6' 5" F, 1985–1989
- 4) 1,877 – Monroe Douglass, 6' 4" G, 1985–1989
- 5) 1,825 – Gibson Jimerson, 6’ 5” G, 2019-2025
- 6) 1,703 – Scott Highmark, 6' 5" F, 1991–1995
- 7) 1,687 – Kevin Lisch, 6' 2" G, 2005–2009
- 8) 1,575 – Kwamain Mitchell, 5' 10" G, 2008–2013
- 9) 1,547 – Tommie Liddell III, 6' 4" G, 2005–2009
- 10) 1,499 – Dwayne Evans, 6' 6" F, 2010–2014

=== Rebounds ===
- 1) 1,424 – Anthony Bonner, 6' 8" F, 1986–1990
- 2) 1,157 – Jerry Koch, 6' 4" F, 1952–1955
- 3) 1,128 – Jim McLaughlin, 6' 4" F, 1953–1956
- 4) 998 – Jordan Goodwin, 6' 3" G, 2017–2021
- 5) 982 – Hasahn French, 6' 7" F, 2017–2021

=== Assists ===
- 1) 878 – Yuri Collins, 6' 0" G, 2019–2023
- 2) 436 – Josh Fisher, 6' 2" G, 2001–2004
- 3) 424 – Charles Newberry, 6' 3" G, 1987–1990
- 4) 422 – Jordair Jett, 6' 1" G, 2010–2014
- 5) 420 – Kwamain Mitchell, 5' 10" G, 2008–2013

=== Steals ===
- 1) 225 – Jordan Goodwin, 6' 3" G, 2017–2021
- 2) 192 – Anthony Bonner, 6' 8" F, 1986–1990
- 3) 179 – Josh Fisher, 6' 2" G, 2001–2004
- 4) 176 – Yuri Collins, 6' 0" G, 2019–2023
- 5) 174 – Jordair Jett, 6' 1" G, 2010–2014

=== Blocks ===
- 1) 226 – Hasahn French, 6' 7" F, 2017–2021
- 2) 135 – Ian Vouyoukas, 6' 11" C, 2003–2007
- 3) 127 – Melvin Robinson, 7' 0" C, 1989–1992
- 4) 113 – Cory Remekun, 6' 9" F, 2009–2013
- 4) 113 – Willie Reed, 6' 11" F, 2008–2010
