= 2017–18 LIU Brooklyn Blackbirds men's basketball team =

American college basketball season

2017–18 LIU Brooklyn Blackbirds men's basketball

NEC tournament champions

NCAA tournament, First Four
- Conference: Northeast Conference
- Record: 18–17 (10–8 NEC)
- Head coach: Derek Kellogg (1st season)
- Assistant coaches: Jim Mack (3rd season); Marlon Williamson (1st season); Ralph Auriantal (1st season)
- Home arena: Steinberg Wellness Center; Barclays Center

2017–18 Northeast Conference men's basketball standings
	Conf.				Overall
Team	W		L	PCT	W		L	PCT
Wagner	14	–	4	.778	23	–	10	.697
Saint Francis (PA)	12	–	6	.667	18	–	13	.581
Mount St. Mary's	12	–	6	.667	18	–	14	.563
LIU Brooklyn †	10	–	8	.556	18	–	17	.514
St. Francis Brooklyn	10	–	8	.556	13	–	18	.419
Robert Morris	9	–	9	.500	16	–	17	.485
Fairleigh Dickinson	9	–	9	.500	13	–	18	.419
Central Connecticut	7	–	11	.389	14	–	18	.438
Sacred Heart	5	–	13	.278	10	–	21	.323
Bryant	2	–	16	.111	3	–	28	.097
† 2018 NEC tournament winner

The 2017–18 LIU Brooklyn Blackbirds men's basketball team represented The Brooklyn Campus of Long Island University during the 2017–18 NCAA Division I men's basketball season. The Blackbirds, led by first-year head coach Derek Kellogg, played their home games at the Steinberg Wellness Center, with several home games at the Barclays Center, as members of the Northeast Conference. They finished the season 18–17, 10–8 in NEC play to finish in a tie for fourth place. As the No. 4 seed in the NEC tournament, they defeated St. Francis Brooklyn, Fairleigh Dickinson, and Wagner to become NEC Tournament champions. They earned the NEC's automatic bid to the NCAA tournament where they lost in the First Four to Radford.

== Previous season ==
The Blackbirds finished the 2016–17 season at 20–12, 13–5 in nec play to finish in second place. In the NEC tournament, they lost to Robert Morris in the quarterfinals.

On March 20, 2017, head coach Jack Perri was fired after five seasons at LIU Brooklyn. Former Massachusetts head coach Derek Kellogg was hired as the new head coach on April 18.

== Preseason ==
In a poll of league coaches at the NEC media day, the Blackbirds were picked to finish in sixth place.

== Roster ==
2017–18 Long Island Blackbirds men's basketball team
Players
Coaches

Pos.	#	Name	Height	Weight	Year	Hometown
G	0	Joel Hernandez	6 ft 3 in (1.91 m)	180 lb (82 kg)	RS Jr	Teaneck, New Jersey
G	1	Julian Batts	5 ft 11 in (1.8 m)	175 lb (79 kg)	So	Jeannette, Pennsylvania
G	2	Jashaun Agosto	5 ft 11 in (1.8 m)	165 lb (75 kg)	So	Seattle, Washington
F	4	Eral Penn	6 ft 7 in (2.01 m)	185 lb (84 kg)	Fr	Baltimore, Maryland
F	5	Zach Coleman	6 ft 7 in (2.01 m)	215 lb (98 kg)	RS Sr	Dallas, Texas
G	10	Craig Owens Jr.	6 ft 3 in (1.91 m)	210 lb (95 kg)	Jr	Louisville, Kentucky
G	11	Shyheim Hicks	6 ft 1 in (1.85 m)	186 lb (84 kg)	Fr	Brockton, Massachusetts
G	13	Jamall Robinson	6 ft 6 in (1.98 m)	210 lb (95 kg)	RS Sr	Cheltenham, Maryland
G	22	Raul Frias	6 ft 1 in (1.85 m)	165 lb (75 kg)	Jr	Miami, Florida
G/F	23	Raiquan Clark	6 ft 6 in (1.98 m)	195 lb (88 kg)	Jr	New Haven, Connecticut
F	24	Ty Flowers	6 ft 9 in (2.06 m)	200 lb (91 kg)	So	Waterbury, Connecticut
G	30	Ashtyn Bradley	6 ft 3 in (1.91 m)	150 lb (68 kg)	So	Fresno, Texas
F/C	44	Ganlandou Cisse	6 ft 9 in (2.06 m)	215 lb (98 kg)	Jr	Dakar, Senegal

Head coach

- Derek Kellogg (UMass)

Assistant coach(es)

- Jim Mack (Springfield)
- Marlon Williamson (Youngstown State)
- Ralph Auriantal (St. Francis Brooklyn)

Legend

- (C) Team captain
- (S) Suspended
- (I) Ineligible
- (W) Walk-on
- Injured
- Current redshirt

Roster
Last update: 2017-9-11

== Schedule and results ==
Date time, TV	Rank^{#}	Opponent^{#}	Result	Record	Site (attendance) city, state
Non-conference regular season
November 10, 2017*; 7:00 pm		at Tulane	L 96–102	0–1	Devlin Fieldhouse (1,032); New Orleans, LA
November 13, 2017*; 7:00 pm		at Fordham	L 68–81	0–2	Rose Hill Gymnasium (1,107); Bronx, NY
November 15, 2017*; 7:00pm		New Rochelle	W 104–68	1–2	Steinberg Wellness Center (1,002); Brooklyn, NY
November 17, 2017*; 12:00 am, CBSSN		vs. Miami (OH); Jamaica Classic	L 74–78	1–3	Montego Bay Convention Center (1,431); Montego Bay, Jamaica
November 18, 2017*; 6:00 pm, CBSSN		vs. Hartford; Jamaica Classic	W 86–84	2–3	Montego Bay Convention Center (1,018); Montego Bay, Jamaica
November 22, 2017*; 3:00 pm, ESPN3		at UMass Lowell	L 66–74	2–4	Costello Athletic Center (407); Lowell, MA
November 25, 2017*; 1:00pm		at Brown	L 86–94	2–5	Pizzitola Sports Center (392); Providence, RI
November 28, 2017*; 7:00 pm, ESPN3		at NJIT	L 69–73	2–6	Fleisher Center (407); Newark, NJ
November 30, 2017*; 7:00 pm		Hartford	W 79–78	3–6	Steinberg Wellness Center (1,782); Brooklyn, NY
December 4, 2017*; 7:00 pm		Stony Brook	W 75–71	4–6	Steinberg Wellness Center (953); Brooklyn, NY
December 10, 2017*; 3:30 pm		Fairfield	L 72–76	4–7	Steinberg Wellness Center (1,242); Brooklyn, NY
December 17, 2017*; 12:00 pm		Saint Peter's	L 56–71	4–8	Steinberg Wellness Center (987); Brooklyn, NY
December 22, 2017*; 7:00 pm		at Binghamton	W 74–66	5–8	Binghamton University Events Center (1,758); Vestal, NY
Northeast Conference regular season
December 29, 2017; 4:30 pm		Fairleigh Dickinson	L 71–82	5–9 (0–1)	Steinberg Wellness Center (697); Brooklyn, NY
December 31, 2017; 2:00 pm		Mount St. Mary's	W 71–57	6–9 (1–1)	Steinberg Wellness Center (597); Brooklyn, NY
January 4, 2018; 7:00 pm		at Saint Francis (PA)	L 68–85	6–10 (1–2)	DeGol Arena (409); Loretto, PA
January 6, 2018; 4:00 pm		at Robert Morris	L 79–88	6–11 (1–3)	PPG Paints Arena (598); Pittsburgh, PA
January 11, 2018; 7:00 pm		at Fairleigh Dickinson	W 90–85	7–11 (2–3)	Rothman Center (342); Hackensack, NJ
January 13, 2018; 4:30 pm		Wagner	W 69–67	8–11 (3–3)	Steinberg Wellness Center (753); Brooklyn, NY
January 18, 2018; 7:00 pm		Bryant	W 83–79	9–11 (4–3)	Steinberg Wellness Center (563); Brooklyn, NY
January 20, 2018; 3:30 pm		at Central Connecticut	L 63–72	9–12 (4–4)	William H. Detrick Gymnasium (1,615); New Britain, CT
January 25, 2018; 9:00 pm, CBSSN		at Mount St. Mary's	L 80–86	9–13 (4–5)	Knott Arena (2,231); Emmitsburg, MD
January 27, 2018; 4:30 pm		Central Connecticut	W 94–89 ^{OT}	10–13 (5–5)	Steinberg Wellness Center (827); Brooklyn, NY
February 1, 2018; 9:00 pm, ESPNU		at Sacred Heart	W 69–60	11–13 (6–5)	William H. Pitt Center (1,522); Fairfield, CT
February 3, 2018; 4:00 pm		at Bryant	W 84–71	12–13 (7–5)	Chace Athletic Center (707); Smithfield, RI
February 8, 2018; 7:00 pm		Saint Francis (PA)	W 83–67	13–13 (8–5)	Steinberg Wellness Center (723); Brooklyn, NY
February 10, 2018; 4:30 pm		Robert Morris	L 82–96	13–14 (8–6)	Steinberg Wellness Center (874); Brooklyn, NY
February 15, 2018; 7:00 pm		at St. Francis Brooklyn	L 79–84	13–15 (8–7)	Generoso Pope Athletic Complex (764); Brooklyn, NY
February 17, 2018; 4:00 pm		at Wagner	L 74–78	13–16 (8–8)	Spiro Sports Center (1,933); Staten Island, NY
February 22, 2018; 8:00 pm, ESPN3		St. Francis Brooklyn; Battle of Brooklyn	W 81–76	14–16 (9–8)	Steinberg Wellness Center (1,812); Brooklyn, NY
February 24, 2018; 2:00 pm		Sacred Heart	W 88–77	15–16 (10–8)	Steinberg Wellness Center (637); Brooklyn, NY
NEC tournament
February 28, 2018; 7:00 pm	(4)	(5) St. Francis Brooklyn; Quarterfinals	W 73–50	16–16	Steinberg Wellness Center (1,173); Brooklyn, NY
March 3, 2018; 12:00 pm, ESPN3	(4)	(6) Fairleigh Dickinson; Semifinals	W 78–77	17–16	Steinberg Wellness Center (1,212); Brooklyn, NY
March 6, 2018; 7:00 pm, ESPN	(4)	at (1) Wagner; Championship	W 71–61	18–16	Spiro Sports Center (2,330); Staten Island, NY
NCAA tournament
March 13, 2018*; 6:40 pm, truTV	(16 E)	vs. (16 E) Radford; First Four	L 61–71	18–17	UD Arena (12,336); Dayton, OH
*Non-conference game. ^{#}Rankings from AP Poll. (#) Tournament seedings in parentheses. E=East. All times are in Eastern Time.
