= 2017–18 Northeast Conference men's basketball season =

- League: NCAA Division I
- Sport: Basketball
- Teams: 10
- TV partner(s): NEC Front Row, ESPN2, MSG, FCS, Regional Sports Networks

NBA Draft

Regular season
- First place: Wagner
- Season MVP: Junior Robinson, MSM
- Top scorer: Junior Robinson, MSM

NEC tournament
- Champions: LIU Brooklyn
- Runners-up: Wagner
- Finals MVP: Joel Hernandez, LIU

Northeast Conference men's basketball seasons
- ← 2016–17 2018–19 →

2017–18 Northeast Conference men's basketball standings
| | Conf. | | | | Overall |
| Team | W | | L | PCT | W | | L | PCT |
|---|---|---|---|---|---|---|---|---|
| Wagner | 14 | – | 4 | .778 | 23 | – | 10 | .697 |
| Saint Francis (PA) | 12 | – | 6 | .667 | 18 | – | 13 | .581 |
| Mount St. Mary's | 12 | – | 6 | .667 | 18 | – | 14 | .563 |
| LIU Brooklyn † | 10 | – | 8 | .556 | 18 | – | 17 | .514 |
| St. Francis Brooklyn | 10 | – | 8 | .556 | 13 | – | 18 | .419 |
| Robert Morris | 9 | – | 9 | .500 | 16 | – | 17 | .485 |
| Fairleigh Dickinson | 9 | – | 9 | .500 | 13 | – | 18 | .419 |
| Central Connecticut | 7 | – | 11 | .389 | 14 | – | 18 | .438 |
| Sacred Heart | 5 | – | 13 | .278 | 10 | – | 21 | .323 |
| Bryant | 2 | – | 16 | .111 | 3 | – | 28 | .097 |
† 2018 NEC tournament winner

The 2017–18 Northeast Conference men's basketball season began with practices in October 2017, followed by the start of the 2017–18 NCAA Division I men's basketball season in November. Conference play started in late December and concluded in February 2018.

The NEC tournament will be held from March 1 through March 7 with the higher-seeded team hosting each game.

== Head coaches ==
=== Coaching changes ===
On April 18, 2017, LIU Brooklyn announced Derek Kellogg as the 14th head coach in program history. Kellogg replaced Jack Perri, whose contract was not renewed; Perri became an assistant at Boston University.

=== Coaches ===
| Team | Head coach | Previous job | Year at school | Overall record | NEC record | NEC tournament championships | Tournaments championships |
|---|---|---|---|---|---|---|---|
| Bryant | Tim O'Shea | Ohio | 10 | 93–183 | 57–85 | 0 | 0 |
| Central Connecticut | Donyell Marshall | Buffalo (asst.) | 2 | 6–23 | 4–14 | 0 | 0 |
| Fairleigh Dickinson | Greg Herenda | UMass Lowell | 5 | 47–76 | 29–41 | 1 | 0 |
| LIU Brooklyn | Derek Kellogg | UMass | 1 | 0–0 | 0–0 | 0 | 0 |
| Mount St. Mary's | Jamion Christian | VCU (asst.) | 6 | 83–81 | 55–33 | 2 | 0 |
| Robert Morris | Andrew Toole | Robert Morris (asst.) | 8 | 134–106 | 82–42 | 1 | 0 |
| Sacred Heart | Anthony Latina | Sacred Heart (asst.) | 5 | 45–80 | 30–40 | 0 | 0 |
| St. Francis Brooklyn | Glenn Braica | St. John's (asst.) | 8 | 102–118 | 67–57 | 0 | 0 |
| Saint Francis (PA) | Rob Krimmel | Saint Francis (PA) (asst.) | 6 | 61–95 | 41–47 | 0 | 0 |
| Wagner | Bashir Mason | Wagner (asst.) | 6 | 87–69 | 56–32 | 0 | 0 |

Notes:

- All records, appearances, titles, etc. are from time with current school only.
- Year at school includes 2017–18 season.
- Overall and NEC/NCAA records are from time at current school and are before the beginning of the 2017–18 season.
- Previous jobs are head coaching jobs unless otherwise noted.

== Preseason ==
=== Preseason coaches poll ===
| Rank | Team |
|---|---|
| 1. | Saint Francis (PA) (9) |
| 2. | Fairleigh Dickinson (1) |
| 3. | Wagner |
| 4. | Mount St. Mary's |
| 5. | Sacred Heart |
| 6. | LIU Brooklyn |
| 7. | Robert Morris |
| 8. | Bryant |
| 9. | Central Connecticut |
| 10. | St. Francis Brooklyn |

() first place votes

=== Preseason All-NEC team ===
| Recipient | School |
|---|---|
| Isaiah Blackmon | Saint Francis (PA) |
| Keith Braxton | Saint Francis (PA) |
| Joseph Lopez | Sacred Heart |
| Junior Robinson | Mount St. Mary's |
| Darian Anderson | Fairleigh Dickinson |

== NEC regular season ==
=== Conference matrix ===
This table summarizes the head-to-head results between teams in conference play. (x) indicates games remaining this season.

| | Bryant | Central Conn. | Fairleigh Dickinson | LIU Br'klyn | Mount St. Mary's | Robert Morris | Sacred Heart | St. Francis Brooklyn | Saint Francis (PA) | Wagner |
|---|---|---|---|---|---|---|---|---|---|---|
| vs. Bryant | – | 2–0 | 2–0 | 2–0 | 1–1 | 2–0 | 1–1 | 2–0 | 2–0 | 2–0 |
| vs. Central Conn. | 0–2 | – | 1–1 | 1–1 | 1–0 | 1–0 | 0–0 | 1–0 | 0–1 | 0–0 |
| vs. Fairleigh Dickinson | 0–1 | 1–1 | – | 1–1 | 0–1 | 1–0 | 1–0 | 1–0 | 0–0 | 1–0 |
| vs. LIU Br'klyn | 0–1 | 1–1 | 1–1 | – | 1–1 | 1–0 | 0–0 | 0–0 | 1–0 | 0–1 |
| vs. Mount St. Mary's | 0–1 | 0–1 | 1–0 | 1–1 | – | 0–0 | 0–1 | 1–1 | 0–1 | 1–0 |
| vs. Robert Morris | 0–1 | 0–1 | 0–1 | 0–1 | 0–0 | – | 0–2 | 0–1 | 1–0 | 2–0 |
| vs. Sacred Heart | 1–0 | 0–0 | 0–1 | 0–0 | 1–0 | 2–0 | – | 1–1 | 2–0 | 1–0 |
| vs. St. Francis Brooklyn | 0–1 | 0–1 | 0–1 | 0–0 | 1–1 | 1–0 | 1–1 | – | 1–0 | 0–1 |
| vs. Saint Francis (PA) | 0–1 | 1–0 | 0–0 | 0–1 | 1–0 | 0–1 | 0–2 | 0–1 | – | 2–0 |
| vs. Wagner | 0–1 | 0–0 | 0–1 | 1–0 | 0–1 | 0–2 | 0–1 | 1–0 | 0–2 | – |
| Total | 1–9 | 5–5 | 4–6 | 5–5 | 6–4 | 7–3 | 2–8 | 6–4 | 6–4 | 8–2 |

=== Player of the week ===
Throughout the regular season, the Northeast Conference offices named player(s) of the week and rookie(s) of the week.

| Week | Player of the week | Rookie of the week |
|---|---|---|
| November 13, 2017 | Raiquan Clark, LIU Brooklyn | Koby Thomas, Robert Morris |
| November 20, 2017 | Junior Robinson, MSM Deion Bute, CCSU | Jalen Jordan, SFBK |
| November 27, 2017 | Dachon Burke, RMU | Koby Thomas (2), RMU |
| December 4, 2017 | Dachon Burke (2), RMU | Nigel Jackson, WC Jon Williams, RMU |
| December 11, 2017 | Dachon Burke (3), RM | Koby Thomas (3), RM |
| December 18, 2017 | JoJo Cooper, WC | Jahlil Jenkins, FDU |
| December 26, 2017 | Keith Braxton, SFPA | Alex Watson, SHU |
| January 2, 2018 | Keith Braxton (2), SFPA | Noah Morgan, FDU |
| January 8, 2018 | Junior Robinson (2), MSM | Koby Thomas (4), RMU Jonah Antonio, MSM |
| January 15, 2018 | Junior Robinson (3), MSM | Donald Carey, MSM |
| January 22, 2018 | JoJo Cooper (2), WC | Jalen Jordan (2), SFBK |
| January 29, 2018 | Junior Robinson (4), MSM Tyler Kohl, CCSU | Chauncey Hawkins, SFBK Jonah Antonio (2), MSM |
| February 5, 2018 | Joel Hernandez, LIU | Mark Flagg, SFPA |
| February 12, 2018 | Dachon Burke, RMU Junior Robinson (5), MSM | Brandon Carroll, BU |
| February 19, 2018 | JoJo Cooper (3), WC Jamaal King (2), SFPA | Jalen Jordan (3), SFBK |
| February 26, 2018 | Keith Braxton (3), SFPA | Jahlii Jenkins (2), FDU |

== Postseason ==
=== NEC tournament ===
- March, 2018 Northeast Conference Basketball Tournament.

Quarterfinals; March
1 | Wagner | 73
8 | Central Connecticut | 61
4 | LIU Brooklyn | 73
5 | St. Francis Brooklyn | 50
(Pairings are reseeded after the first round)
2 | Mount St. Mary's | 56
7 | Robert Morris | 60
3 | Saint Francis (PA) | 75
6 | Farleigh Dickinson | 84

Semifinals; March
1 | Wagner | 75
7 | Robert Morris | 64
4 | LIU Brooklyn | 78
6 | Farleigh Dickinson | 77

Championship; March
1 | Wagner | 61
4 | LIU Brooklyn | 71

All games will be played at the venue of the higher seed

=== NCAA tournament ===
| Seed | Region | School | First Four | 2nd round | 3rd round | Sweet 16 | Elite Eight | Final Four | Championship |
|---|---|---|---|---|---|---|---|---|---|
| 16 | East | LIU Brooklyn | L 61–71 vs. #16 Radford – (Dayton) | | | | | | |

=== National Invitational Tournament ===
| Seed | Bracket | School | 1st round | 2nd round | Quarterfinals | Semifinals | Championship |
|---|---|---|---|---|---|---|---|
| 8 | Baylor | Wagner | L 59–80 vs. #1 Baylor – (Waco) | | | | |

=== CollegeInsider.com Postseason Tournament ===
| School | 1st round | 2nd round | Quarterfinals | Semifinals | Championship |
|---|---|---|---|---|---|
| Saint Francis (PA) | L 61–84 vs. UIC – (Chicago) | | | | |

== All-NEC honors and awards ==
Following the regular season, the conference selected outstanding performers based on a poll of league coaches.

| Honor | Recipient |
|---|---|
| Player of the Year | Junior Robinson, MSM |
| Coach of the Year | Bashir Mason, WC |
| Defensive Player of the Year | Chris Wray, MSM |
| Rookie of the Year | Koby Thomas, RMU |
| Most Improved Player of the Year | Andre Wolford, SFPA |
| All-NEC First Team | JoJo Cooper, WC |
| All-NEC First Team | Keith Braxton, SFU |
| All-NEC First Team | Joel Hernandez, LIU |
| All-NEC First Team | Jamaal King, SFU |
| All-NEC First Team | Junior Robinson, MSM |
| All-NEC Second Team | Dachon Burke, RMU |
| All-NEC Second Team | Rasheem Dunn, SFBK |
| All-NEC Second Team | Blake Francis, WC |
| All-NEC Second Team | Mike Holloway, FDU |
| All-NEC Second Team | Tyler Kohl, CCSU |
| All-NEC Third Team | Raiquan Clark, LIU |
| All-NEC Third Team | Darnell Edge, FDU |
| All-NEC Third Team | Adam Grant, BU |
| All-NEC Third Team | Romone Saunders, WC |
| All-NEC Third Team | Chris Wray, MSM |
| All-NEC Rookie Team | Jonah Antonio, MSM |
| All-NEC Rookie Team | Jahlil Jenkins, FDU |
| All-NEC Rookie Team | Jalen Jordan, SFBK |
| All-NEC Rookie Team | Noah Morgan, FDU |
| All-NEC Rookie Team | Koby Thomas, RMU |
