= 2017–18 Bryant Bulldogs men's basketball team =

American college basketball season

2017–18 Bryant Bulldogs men's basketball
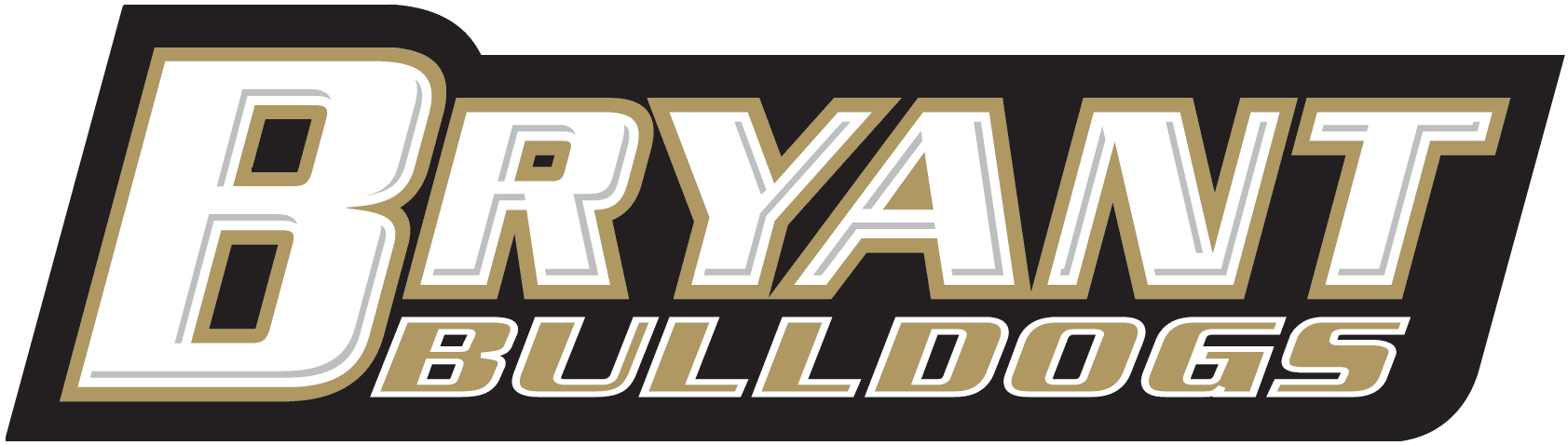
- Conference: Northeast Conference
- Record: 3–28 (2–16 NEC)
- Head coach: Tim O'Shea (10th season)
- Assistant coaches: Happy Dobbs; Frankie Dobbs; Mike Allen
- Home arena: Chace Athletic Center

2017–18 Northeast Conference men's basketball standings
	Conf.				Overall
Team	W		L	PCT	W		L	PCT
Wagner	14	–	4	.778	23	–	10	.697
Saint Francis (PA)	12	–	6	.667	18	–	13	.581
Mount St. Mary's	12	–	6	.667	18	–	14	.563
LIU Brooklyn †	10	–	8	.556	18	–	17	.514
St. Francis Brooklyn	10	–	8	.556	13	–	18	.419
Robert Morris	9	–	9	.500	16	–	17	.485
Fairleigh Dickinson	9	–	9	.500	13	–	18	.419
Central Connecticut	7	–	11	.389	14	–	18	.438
Sacred Heart	5	–	13	.278	10	–	21	.323
Bryant	2	–	16	.111	3	–	28	.097
† 2018 NEC tournament winner

The 2017–2018 Bryant Bulldogs men's basketball team represented Bryant University during the 2017–18 NCAA Division I men's basketball season. The team, led by 10th-year head coach Tim O'Shea, played their home games at the Chace Athletic Center in Smithfield, Rhode Island as members of the Northeast Conference. They finished the season 3–28, 2–16 in NEC play to finish in last place. They failed to qualify for the NEC tournament.

On February 12, 2018, Tim O'Shea announced that he would retire at the end of the season. He finished at Bryant with a ten-year record of 96–210. On April 2, the school hired Iona assistant Jared Grasso as head coach.

== Previous season ==
The Bulldogs finished the 2016–17 season 12–20, 9–9 in NEC play to finish tied for fifth place. They participated in the NEC tournament, losing in the quarterfinals to Saint Francis (PA).

== Preseason ==
In a poll of league coaches at the NEC media day, the Bulldogs were picked to finish in eighth place.

== Roster ==
2017–18 Bryant Bulldogs men's basketball team
Players
Coaches

Pos.	#	Name	Height	Weight	Year	Hometown
F/C	20	Gus Riley	6 ft 8 in (2.03 m)	225 lb (102 kg)	Sr	Nelson, New Zealand
G/F	3	Bosko Kostur	6 ft 7 in (2.01 m)	215 lb (98 kg)	Sr	Melbourne, Australia
G	1	Hunter Ware	6 ft 2 in (1.88 m)	170 lb (77 kg)	Sr	Powder Springs, Georgia
G	10	Taylor McHugh	6 ft 2 in (1.88 m)	170 lb (77 kg)	Jr	Centreville, Virginia
G	11	Adam Grant	6 ft 1 in (1.85 m)	170 lb (77 kg)	So	Franklin, Virginia
G	21	Tanner Johnson	6 ft 5 in (1.96 m)	205 lb (93 kg)	So	Lexington, Kentucky
G	0	Ikenna Ndugba	6 ft 0 in (1.83 m)	190 lb (86 kg)	So	Boston, Massachusetts
F	23	Malik Smith	6 ft 6 in (1.98 m)	215 lb (98 kg)	So	Cleveland, Ohio
F	54	Sabastian Townes	6 ft 5 in (1.96 m)	240 lb (109 kg)	So	Chesapeake, Virginia
G/F	2	Brandon Carroll	6 ft 7 in (2.01 m)	190 lb (86 kg)	RS Fr	Brewster, New York
F/C	13	Monty Urmilevicius	6 ft 8 in (2.03 m)	190 lb (86 kg)	RS Fr	Kaunas, Lithuania
C	24	Dren Dedushaj	7 ft 1 in (2.16 m)	245 lb (111 kg)	Fr	Brooklyn, New York
F	4	Charles Dudley	6 ft 5 in (1.96 m)	220 lb (100 kg)	Fr	Rancho Santa Fe, California
G/F	5	Ryan Layman	6 ft 7 in (2.01 m)	210 lb (95 kg)	Fr	Wrentham, Massachusetts

Head coach

- Tim O'Shea (Boston College)

Assistant coach(es)

- Frank "Happy" Dobbs (Villanova)
- Frankie Dobbs (Bryant)
- Mike Allen (Ohio)

Legend

- (C) Team captain
- (S) Suspended
- (I) Ineligible
- (W) Walk-on
- Injured
- Current redshirt

Roster

== Schedule and results ==
Date time, TV	Opponent	Result	Record	Site (attendance) city, state
Non-conference regular season
November 10, 2017*; 7:00 pm, SECN+	at Georgia	L 54–79	0–1	Stegeman Coliseum (7,387); Athens, GA
November 14, 2017*; 7:00 pm, ACCN Extra	at NC State	L 72–95	0–2	PNC Arena (10,472); Raleigh, NC
November 18, 2017*; 4:00 PM	Navy	L 71–79	0–3	Chace Athletic Center (639); Smithfield, RI
November 21, 2017*; 7:00 pm, BTN Plus	at Rutgers	L 54–83	0–4	Louis Brown Athletic Center (3,044); Piscataway, NJ
November 24, 2017*; 3:00 pm, ESPN3	at Hartford	W 78–73	1–4	Chase Arena at Reich Family Pavilion (951); Hartford, CT
November 26, 2017*; 6:00 pm	Brown	L 67–81	1–5	Chace Athletic Center (608); Smithfield, RI
November 29, 2017*; 8:00 pm, ESPN3	at Yale	L 67–84	1–6	Payne Whitney Gymnasium (711); New Haven, CT
December 2, 2017*; 1:00 pm, ESPN3	at New Hampshire	L 59–75	1–7	Lundholm Gym (369); Durham, NH
December 6, 2017*; 7:00 pm, ESPN3	at Albany; Gotham Classic	L 68–84	1–8	SEFCU Arena (2,012); Albany, NY
December 9, 2017*; 1:00 pm, ESPN3	at Memphis; Gotham Classic	L 72–90	1–9	FedExForum (4,373); Memphis, TN
December 11, 2017*; 7:00 pm, ESPNU	at Louisville; Gotham Classic	L 59–102	1–10	KFC Yum! Center (16,236); Louisville, KY
December 17, 2017*; 1:00 pm	Siena; Gotham Classic	L 68–87	1–11	Chace Athletic Center (406); Smithfield, RI
December 22, 2017*; 12:00 pm	at Dartmouth	L 58–75	1–12	Leede Arena (647); Hanover, NH
NEC regular season
December 29, 2018; 3:00 pm	Robert Morris	L 54–68	1–13 (0–1)	Chace Athletic Center (305); Smithfield, RI
December 31, 2018; 3:00 pm	Saint Francis (PA)	L 82–86	1–14 (0–2)	Chace Athletic Center (416); Smithfield, RI
January 4, 2018; 7:00 pm	at Mount St. Mary's	L 80–96	1–15 (0–3)	Knott Arena (1,348); Emmitsburg, MD
January 6, 2018; 1:00 pm	at Sacred Heart	W 79–74	2–15 (1–3)	William H. Pitt Center (210); Fairfield, CT
January 11, 2018; 7:00 pm	Wagner	L 62–71	2–16 (1–4)	Chace Athletic Center (609); Smithfield, RI
January 13, 2018; 3:30 pm	at Central Connecticut	L 76–80	2–17 (1–5)	William H. Detrick Gymnasium; New Britain, CT
January 18, 2018; 7:00 pm	at LIU Brooklyn	L 79–83	2–18 (1–6)	Steinberg Wellness Center (563); Brooklyn, NY
January 20, 2018; 4:00 pm	at St. Francis Brooklyn	L 80–85	2–19 (1–7)	Generoso Pope Athletic Complex (503); Brooklyn, NY
January 25, 2018; 7:00 pm, ESPN3	Central Connecticut	L 74–80	2–20 (1–8)	Chace Athletic Center; Smithfield, RI
January 27, 2018; 1:00 pm	Fairleigh Dickinson	L 78–89	2–21 (1–9)	Chace Athletic Center (862); Smithfield, RI
February 1, 2018; 7:00 pm	St. Francis Brooklyn	L 69–73	2–22 (1–10)	Chace Athletic Center (583); Smithfield, RI
February 3, 2018; 4:00 pm	LIU Brooklyn	L 71–84	2–23 (1–11)	Chace Athletic Center (707); Smithfield, RI
February 8, 2018; 5:00 pm, CBSSN	at Wagner	L 76–96	2–24 (1–12)	Spiro Sports Center (1,997); Staten Island, NY
February 10, 2018; 1:00 pm	Mount St. Mary's	W 79–77	3–24 (2–12)	Chace Athletic Center (560); Smithfield, RI
February 15, 2018; 7:00 pm	at Robert Morris	L 60–83	3–25 (2–13)	A. J. Palumbo Center (583); Pittsburgh, PA
February 17, 2018; 1:00 pm	at Saint Francis (PA)	L 56–89	3–26 (2–14)	DeGol Arena (1,610); Loretto, PA
February 22, 2018; 7:00 pm	Sacred Heart	L 84–94	3–27 (2–15)	Chace Athletic Center (646); Smithfield, RI
February 24, 2018; 4:30 pm	at Fairleigh Dickinson	L 84–94	3–28 (2–16)	Rothman Center (646); Hackensack, NJ
*Non-conference game. ^{#}Rankings from AP Poll. (#) Tournament seedings in parentheses. All times are in Eastern Time..
