= 2017–18 St. Francis Brooklyn Terriers men's basketball team =

American college basketball season

2017–18 St. Francis Brooklyn Terriers men's basketball
- Conference: Northeast Conference
- Record: 13–18 (10–8 NEC)
- Head coach: Glenn Braica (8th season)
- Assistant coaches: Clive Bentick (11th season); Ron Ganulin (5th season); Jamaal Womack (5th season)
- Home arena: Generoso Pope Athletic Complex

2017–18 Northeast Conference men's basketball standings
| | Conf. | | | | Overall |
| Team | W | | L | PCT | W | | L | PCT |
|---|---|---|---|---|---|---|---|---|
| Wagner | 14 | – | 4 | .778 | 23 | – | 10 | .697 |
| Saint Francis (PA) | 12 | – | 6 | .667 | 18 | – | 13 | .581 |
| Mount St. Mary's | 12 | – | 6 | .667 | 18 | – | 14 | .563 |
| LIU Brooklyn † | 10 | – | 8 | .556 | 18 | – | 17 | .514 |
| St. Francis Brooklyn | 10 | – | 8 | .556 | 13 | – | 18 | .419 |
| Robert Morris | 9 | – | 9 | .500 | 16 | – | 17 | .485 |
| Fairleigh Dickinson | 9 | – | 9 | .500 | 13 | – | 18 | .419 |
| Central Connecticut | 7 | – | 11 | .389 | 14 | – | 18 | .438 |
| Sacred Heart | 5 | – | 13 | .278 | 10 | – | 21 | .323 |
| Bryant | 2 | – | 16 | .111 | 3 | – | 28 | .097 |
† 2018 NEC tournament winner

The 2017–18 St. Francis Brooklyn Terriers men's basketball team represented St. Francis College during the 2017–18 NCAA Division I men's basketball season. The Terrier's home games were played at the Generoso Pope Athletic Complex. The team has been a member of the Northeast Conference since 1981. They were coached by Glenn Braica, who was in his eighth year at the helm of the Terriers. The Terriers finished the season 13–18, 10–8 in NEC play to finish in a tie for fourth place. As the No. 5 seed in the NEC tournament, they lost LIU Brooklyn in the quarterfinals.

== Previous season ==
The Terriers finished the 2016–17 season 4–27, 2–16 in NEC play. It marked the first time since the 1993–94 season that the Terriers finished 10th in the NEC. It also represented the second consecutive losing season for the Terriers and the first season in Braica's tenure that the Terriers missed the NEC tournament.

== Offseason ==
The Terriers had three freshman transfer from the program after only one year: Robert Montgomery Jr., Gianni Ford, and Jahmel Bodrick. All three played significant minutes last season; Ford, and Bodrick averaged 14.5 minutes per game, and Montgomery averaged 18.7 minutes per game.

The Terriers added two freshman guards, Jalen Jordan and Chauncey Hawkins, and a junior college transfer Milja Cosic. Jordan, a 6'3" guard, finished his high school career in 2016, averaging 17.5 points a game as a senior and scored over 1,000 career points. Hawkins, a 5'8" guard, earned first-team All-North Jersey honors this past season after averaging 19.2 points, 4.9 rebounds, 4.1 assists and 3.4 steals. Cosic, a 6'6" forward, will have three years of eligibility after playing one season at Frank Phillips College in Borger, Texas. Last season, Cosic played in only 15 games for the Plainsmen after suffering an early-season ankle injury, and averaged 6.9 points and 4.2 rebounds per game in 22.0 minutes per contest.

=== Departures ===
| Name | Number | Pos. | Height | Weight | Year | Hometown | Notes |
|---|---|---|---|---|---|---|---|
| Robert Montgomery Jr. | 5 | F | 6'7" | 215 | Freshman | Gaithersburg, Maryland | Transferred to Indian Hills Community College |
| Gianni Ford | 3 | G | 6'0" | 155 | Freshman | Brooklyn, New York | Transferred to Blinn College |
| Jahmel Bodrick | 15 | F | 6'6" | 230 | Freshman | Bronx, New York | Transferred to Ranger College |

=== Incoming transfers ===
| Name | Number | Pos. | Height | Weight | Year | Hometown | Previous School |
|---|---|---|---|---|---|---|---|
| Milija Cosic | 21 | PF | 6'6" | 220 | Junior | Belgrade, Serbia | Junior college transfer from Frank Phillips College |

=== Class of 2017 signees ===
College recruiting
| Name | Hometown | School | Height | Weight | Commit date |
|---|---|---|---|---|---|
| Jalen Jordan; PG | Conyers, GA | National Top Sports Institute | 6 ft 3 in (1.91 m) | 155 lb (70 kg) | May 5, 2017 |
| Jalen Jordan; PG | Recruit ratings: No ratings found | | | | |
| Chauncey Hawkins; PG | Spring Valley, New York | Saint Joseph Regional High School | 5 ft 8 in (1.73 m) | 140 lb (64 kg) | April 11, 2017 |
| Chauncey Hawkins; PG | Recruit ratings: No ratings found | | | | |
Overall recruit ranking:
Note: In many cases, Scout, Rivals, 247Sports, On3, and ESPN may conflict in their listings of height and weight.; In these cases, the average was taken. ESPN grades are on a 100-point scale.; Sources: "2017 St. Francis Brooklyn Signees". Rivals.; "2017 St. Francis Brooklyn Signees". Scout.; "2017 St. Francis Brooklyn Signees". ESPN.; "Scout.com Team Recruiting Rankings". Scout.; "2017 Team Ranking". Rivals.; "2017 St. Francis Brooklyn Signees". 247Sports.

== Preseason ==
In a poll of league coaches at the NEC media day, the Terriers were picked to finish in last place.

== Roster ==
2017–18 St. Francis Brooklyn Terriers men's basketball team
Players
Coaches

| Pos. | # | Name | Height | Weight | Year | Previous school | Hometown |
|---|---|---|---|---|---|---|---|
| F | 33 | Jagos Lasic | 6 ft 8 in (2.03 m) | 200 lb (91 kg) | RS Sr | New Mexico Military Institute | Belgrade, Serbia |
| G | 23 | Darelle Porter | 6 ft 6 in (1.98 m) | 185 lb (84 kg) | Sr | Polk State College | Pittsburgh, Pennsylvania |
| G/F | 4 | Gunnar Ólafsson | 6 ft 3 in (1.91 m) | 195 lb (88 kg) | Sr | Menntaskólinn við Hamrahlíð | Reykjavík, Iceland |
| G | 24 | Sam Harris IV (W) | 5 ft 10 in (1.78 m) | 165 lb (75 kg) | Sr | Tampa Catholic High School | Tampa, Florida |
| G | 10 | Glenn Sanabria | 5 ft 11 in (1.8 m) | 180 lb (82 kg) | RS Jr | St. Peter's Boys High School | Staten Island, New York |
| F | 13 | Keon Williams | 6 ft 4 in (1.93 m) | 185 lb (84 kg) | RS Jr | John Hardin High School | Atlanta, Georgia |
| F | 11 | Joshua Nurse | 6 ft 9 in (2.06 m) | 210 lb (95 kg) | Jr | Queens High School of Teaching | Laurelton, New York |
| F | 21 | Milija Cosic | 6 ft 6 in (1.98 m) | 220 lb (100 kg) | RS So | Frank Phillips College | Belgrade, Serbia |
| C | 20 | Cori Johnson | 6 ft 9 in (2.06 m) | 270 lb (122 kg) | RS So | South Shore High School | Brooklyn, New York |
| G | 0 | Rasheem Dunn | 6 ft 2 in (1.88 m) | 170 lb (77 kg) | So | Thomas Jefferson High School | Brooklyn, New York |
| G | 14 | Jalen Jordan | 6 ft 3 in (1.91 m) | 155 lb (70 kg) | Fr | National Top Sports Institute | Conyers, Georgia |
| G | 2 | Chauncey Hawkins | 5 ft 8 in (1.73 m) | 140 lb (64 kg) | Fr | Saint Joseph Regional High School | Spring Valley, New York |
| F | 5 | Yaradyah Evans | 6 ft 6 in (1.98 m) | 190 lb (86 kg) | RS Fr | South Shore High School | Brooklyn, New York |
| G | 15 | Josh Nicholas | 6 ft 2 in (1.88 m) | 175 lb (79 kg) | RS Fr | St. Anthony's High School | Melville, New York |
| F | 40 | Bryant Beckford (W) | 6 ft 5 in (1.96 m) | 190 lb (86 kg) | Fr | IMG Academy | Bronx, New York |

Head coach

- Glenn Braica (Queens College '89)

Assistant coach(es)

- Clive Bentick (Canisius '01)
- Ron Ganulin (LIU '68)
- Jamaal Womack (St. Francis '09)

Legend

- (C) Team captain
- (S) Suspended
- (I) Ineligible
- (W) Walk-on
- Injured
- Current redshirt

Roster
Last update: August 24, 2017

== Schedule and results ==
| Date time, TV | Rank^{#} | Opponent^{#} | Result | Record | High points | High rebounds | High assists | Site (attendance) city, state |
Exhibition
| August 27, 2017*; 3:00 pm | | at Carleton | L 55–89 | | 10 – Sanabria | 4 – Cosic, Ólafsson | 3 – Sanabria, Hawkins | Ravens Nest; Ottawa, Ontario |
| August 28, 2017*; 7:00 pm | | at McGill | L 67–80 | | 12 – Jordan, Sanabria | 4 – Jordan, Porter | 3 – 3 tied | Love Competition Hall (60); Montreal, Quebec |
| August 29, 2017*; 7:00 pm | | at Concordia (QC) | W 75–66 | | 14 – Dunn | 8 – Dunn | – | Concordia Gymnasium; Montreal, Quebec |
Non-conference regular season
| November 11, 2017*; 5:30 pm | | at Duquesne | L 70–80 | 0–1 | 21 – Dunn | 8 – Lasic | 4 – Hawkins | A. J. Palumbo Center (1,833); Pittsburgh, PA |
| November 15, 2017*; 7:00 pm | | at Manhattan | L 79–80 ^{OT} | 0–2 | 13 – Dunn, Sanabria | 11 – Porter | 6 – Nicholas | Draddy Gymnasium (1,018); Riverdale, NY |
| November 20, 2017*; 7:00 pm | | Brown | W 77–74 | 1–2 | 23 – Dunn | 10 – Porter | 6 – Dunn | Generoso Pope Athletic Complex (513); Brooklyn, NY |
| November 24, 2017*; 4:00 am | | vs. Navy; FGCU Shootout | L 76–85 | 1–3 | 14 – Nicholas | 3 – 3 tied | 3 – Porter | Alico Arena (267); Fort Myers, FL |
| November 25, 2017*; 4:00 pm | | vs. Denver; FGCU Shootout | L 50–60 | 1–4 | 9 – Jordan | 6 – Dunn, Porter | 2 – Dunn, Hawkins | Alico Arena (202); Fort Myers, FL |
| November 26, 2017*; 6:00 pm, ESPN3 | | at Florida Gulf Coast; FGCU Shootout | L 51–75 | 1–5 | 10 – Dunn | 5 – Nurse | 2 – Nurse | Alico Arena (2,929); Fort Myers, FL |
| November 30, 2017*; 7:00 pm | | New Rochelle | W 104–79 | 2–5 | 19 – Sanabria | 10 – Porter | 7 – Sanabria | Generoso Pope Athletic Complex (320); Brooklyn, NY |
| December 3, 2017*; 2:00 pm, ACCN Extra | | at No. 5 Notre Dame | L 53–71 | 2–6 | 10 – 3 tied | 8 – Cosic | 4 – Sanabria | Edmund P. Joyce Center (8,911); South Bend, IN |
| December 9, 2017*; 2:00 pm | | at Fordham | L 68–76 | 2–7 | 22 – Dunn | 6 – Porter | 4 – Dunn | Rose Hill Gymnasium (1,578); Bronx, NY |
| December 12, 2017*; 7:00 pm | | Army | L 64–76 | 2–8 | 14 – Hawkins | 8 – Porter | 2 – Dunn, Nicholas | Generoso Pope Athletic Complex (475); Brooklyn, NY |
| December 16, 2017*; 4:00 pm | | SUNY Maritime | W 88–67 | 3–8 | 18 – Jordan | 9 – Cosic | 3 – 3 tied | Generoso Pope Athletic Complex (247); Brooklyn, NY |
| December 23, 2017*; 4:00 pm | | at Saint Peter's | L 68–71 | 3–9 | 25 – Dunn | 10 – Dunn | 4 – Jordan | Yanitelli Center (501); Jersey City, NJ |
NEC regular season
| December 29, 2017; 7:00 pm | | at Sacred Heart | W 73–68 | 4–9 (1–0) | 16 – Dunn | 5 – Dunn, Porter | 5 – Sanabria | William H. Pitt Center; Fairfield, CT |
| December 31, 2017; 1:00 pm | | Wagner | W 82–75 | 5–9 (2–0) | 22 – Dunn | 7 – Dunn | 4 – Sanabria | Generoso Pope Athletic Complex (407); Brooklyn, NY |
| January 4, 2018; 7:00 pm | | at Robert Morris | L 79–80 ^{OT} | 5–10 (2–1) | 17 – Dunn | 10 – Dunn | 4 – Sanabria | A.J. Palumbo Center (855); Pittsburgh, PA |
| January 6, 2018; 4:00 pm | | at Saint Francis (PA) | L 87–91 | 5–11 (2–2) | 22 – Jordan | 8 – Dunn | 5 – Sanabria | DeGol Arena (712); Loretto, PA |
| January 11, 2018; 7:00 pm | | Central Connecticut | W 77–60 | 6–11 (3–2) | 21 – Dunn | 4 – 4 tied | 4 – 3 tied | Generoso Pope Athletic Complex (364); Brooklyn, NY |
| January 13, 2018; 4:00 pm | | Sacred Heart | L 52–92 | 6–12 (3–3) | 10 – Sanabria | 3 – Hawkins | 1 – 7 tied | Generoso Pope Athletic Complex (328); Brooklyn, NY |
| January 18, 2018; 7:00 pm | | Mount St. Mary's | W 81–73 | 7–12 (4–3) | 20 – Dunn, Sanabria | 9 – Dunn | 4 – Dunn | Generoso Pope Athletic Complex (385); Brooklyn, NY |
| January 20, 2018; 1:00 pm | | Bryant | W 85–80 | 8–12 (5–3) | 21 – Sanabria | 8 – Jordan | 5 – Porter, Sanabria | Generoso Pope Athletic Complex (503); Brooklyn, NY |
| January 25, 2018; 7:00 pm | | at Fairleigh Dickinson | W 76–70 | 9–12 (6–3) | 18 – Dunn | 6 – Dunn | 6 – Dunn | Rothman Center (297); Hackensack, NJ |
| January 27, 2018; 4:00 pm | | at Mount St. Mary's | L 72–86 | 9–13 (6–4) | 23 – Sanabria | 7 – Dunn | 4 – Dunn, Hawkins | Knott Arena (3,005); Emmitsburg, MD |
| February 1, 2018; 7:00 pm | | at Bryant | W 73–69 | 10–13 (7–4) | 21 – Sanabria | 8 – Nurse, Ólafsson | 6 – Sanabria | Chace Athletic Center (583); Smithfield, RI |
| February 3, 2018; 4:00 pm | | at Wagner | L 61–79 | 10–14 (7–5) | 18 – Hawkins | 9 – Dunn | 3 – Sanabria | Spiro Sports Center (1,923); Staten Island, NY |
| February 8, 2018; 7:00 pm | | Robert Morris | W 77–65 | 11–14 (8–5) | 21 – Jordan | 8 – Porter | 4 – Porter, Sanabria | Generoso Pope Athletic Complex (617); Brooklyn, NY |
| February 10, 2018; 4:00 pm | | Saint Francis (PA) | L 65–90 | 11–15 (8–6) | 10 – Jordan | 6 – Ólafsson | 2 – Ólafsson, Sanabria | Generoso Pope Athletic Complex (405); Brooklyn, NY |
| February 15, 2018; 7:00 pm | | LIU Brooklyn | W 84–79 | 12–15 (9–6) | 24 – Dunn | 7 – Dunn | 5 – Dunn | Generoso Pope Athletic Complex (764); Brooklyn, NY |
| February 17, 2018; 4:00 pm, ESPN3 | | Fairleigh Dickinson | W 87–74 | 13–15 (10–6) | 21 – Dunn | 15 – Porter | 3 – Dunn, Sanabria | Generoso Pope Athletic Complex (636); Brooklyn, NY |
| February 22, 2018; 7:00 pm | | at LIU Brooklyn; Battle of Brooklyn | L 76–81 | 13–16 (10–7) | 24 – Dunn | 11 – Lasic | 4 – Dunn, Sanabria | Steinberg Wellness Center (1,812); Brooklyn, NY |
| February 24, 2018; 3:30 pm | | at Central Connecticut | L 75–78 ^{OT} | 13–17 (10–8) | 20 – Dunn | 9 – Dunn | 3 – 3 tied | William H. Detrick Gymnasium (1,849); New Britain, CT |
Northeast Conference tournament
| February 28, 2018; 7:00 pm | (5) | at (4) LIU Brooklyn; Quarterfinals | L 50–73 | 13–18 | 10 – Dunn | 10 – Lasic | 3 – Sanabria | Steinberg Wellness Center (1,173); Brooklyn, NY |
*Non-conference game. ^{#}Rankings from AP Poll. (#) Tournament seedings in parentheses. All times are in Eastern Time.

== Awards and honors ==
Rasheem Dunn

- Selected to the 2017–18 NEC men's basketball All-Conference second team

Jalen Jordan

- Selected to the 2017–18 NEC men's basketball All-Rookie team
- 3x rookie of the week

Chauncey Hawkins

- 1x rookie of the week

== See also ==
- 2017–18 St. Francis Brooklyn Terriers women's basketball team
