= 2017–18 Saint Francis Red Flash men's basketball team =

American college basketball season

2017–18 Saint Francis Red Flash men's basketball

CIT, First round
- Conference: Northeast Conference
- Record: 18–13 (12–6 NEC)
- Head coach: Rob Krimmel (6th season)
- Associate head coach: Andrew Helton
- Assistant coaches: Eric Taylor; Umar Shannon
- Home arena: DeGol Arena

2017–18 Northeast Conference men's basketball standings
	Conf.				Overall
Team	W		L	PCT	W		L	PCT
Wagner	14	–	4	.778	23	–	10	.697
Saint Francis (PA)	12	–	6	.667	18	–	13	.581
Mount St. Mary's	12	–	6	.667	18	–	14	.563
LIU Brooklyn †	10	–	8	.556	18	–	17	.514
St. Francis Brooklyn	10	–	8	.556	13	–	18	.419
Robert Morris	9	–	9	.500	16	–	17	.485
Fairleigh Dickinson	9	–	9	.500	13	–	18	.419
Central Connecticut	7	–	11	.389	14	–	18	.438
Sacred Heart	5	–	13	.278	10	–	21	.323
Bryant	2	–	16	.111	3	–	28	.097
† 2018 NEC tournament winner

The 2017–18 Saint Francis Red Flash men's basketball team represented Saint Francis University during the 2017–18 NCAA Division I men's basketball season. The Red Flash, led by sixth-year head coach Rob Krimmel, played their home games at the DeGol Arena in Loretto, Pennsylvania as members of the Northeast Conference. They finished the season 18–13, 12–6 in NEC play to finish in a tie for second place. They lost in the quarterfinals of the NEC tournament to Fairleigh Dickinson. They were invited to the CollegeInsider.com Tournament where they lost in the first round to UIC.

== Previous season ==
The Red Flash finished the 2016–17 season at 17–17, 11–7 in NEC play to finish in a tie for third place. They defeated Bryant and Wagner to advance to the championship game of the NEC tournament where they lost to Mount St. Mary's. They were invited to the CollegeInsider.com Tournament where they defeated Jacksonville in the first round to win the Hugh Durham Classic. However, they lost in the second round of the CIT to UMBC.

== Preseason ==
In a poll of league coaches at the NEC media day, the Red Flash were picked to win the NEC, receiving nine of 10 first place votes. Senior guard Isaiah Blackmon and sophomore Keith Braxton were named the preseason All-NEC team.

== Roster ==
2017–18 Saint Francis Red Flash men's basketball team
Players
Coaches

Pos.	#	Name	Height	Weight	Year	Previous school	Hometown
G	0	Markus Vallien	5 ft 10 in (1.78 m)	160 lb (73 kg)	Fr	St. Pius X HS	Houston, TX
G	1	Malik Harmon	6 ft 0 in (1.83 m)	194 lb (88 kg)	RS Sr	Christ the King HS	Queens, NY
G	2	Scott Meredith	6 ft 2 in (1.88 m)	180 lb (82 kg)	Jr	Hargrave Military Academy	Pilot Mountain, NC
G	3	Jamaal King	5 ft 10 in (1.78 m)	170 lb (77 kg)	Jr	Bishop O'Connell HS	Salisbury, MD
G	4	Randall Gaskins Jr.	6 ft 3 in (1.91 m)	180 lb (82 kg)	So	Bishop O'Connell HS	Woodbridge, VA
F/C	5	Daniel Wallace	6 ft 8 in (2.03 m)	215 lb (98 kg)	Sr	Nansemond River HS	Suffolk, VA
G	11	Isaiah Blackmon (injured) (redshirt)	6 ft 1 in (1.85 m)	170 lb (77 kg)	Jr	West Charlotte HS	Charlotte, NC
G	13	Keith Braxton	6 ft 4 in (1.93 m)	208 lb (94 kg)	So	Lawrenceville School	Glassboro, NJ
G	14	Andre Wolford	6 ft 2 in (1.88 m)	175 lb (79 kg)	Jr	Saint Ignatius HS	North Olmsted, OH
G	15	Deon Baker	6 ft 5 in (1.96 m)	220 lb (100 kg)	Sr	CC of Beaver County	Pittsburgh, PA
G	20	Dan Henry	5 ft 11 in (1.8 m)	160 lb (73 kg)	Fr	Hamburg HS	Hamburg, NY
G	22	Michael Klebon	6 ft 2 in (1.88 m)	175 lb (79 kg)	Jr	Southern Columbia Area HS	Paxinos, PA
G	24	Jordan Forehand	6 ft 0 in (1.83 m)	180 lb (82 kg)	Jr	IMG Academy	Bridgewater, NJ
F/C	30	Deivydas Kuzavas	6 ft 10 in (2.08 m)	210 lb (95 kg)	So	St. Mary's Ryken HS	Kretinga, Lithuania
F/C	33	Luidgy Laporal	6 ft 8 in (2.03 m)	240 lb (109 kg)	Jr	Harcum College	Petit-Bourg, France
F	42	Mark Flagg	6 ft 9 in (2.06 m)	195 lb (88 kg)	Fr	Pennsbury HS	Fairless Hills, PA

Head coach

- Rob Krimmel (Saint Francis (PA))

Assistant coach(es)

- Andrew Helton (Miami (OH))
- Eric Taylor (Saint Francis (PA))
- Umar Shannon (Saint Francis (PA))

Legend

- (C) Team captain
- (S) Suspended
- (I) Ineligible
- (W) Walk-on
- Injured
- Current redshirt

Roster

== Schedule and results ==
Date time, TV	Rank^{#}	Opponent^{#}	Result	Record	Site (attendance) city, state
Non-conference regular season
November 11, 2017*; 8:00 pm		at No. 22 Saint Mary's	L 68–85	0–1	McKeon Pavilion (3,276); Moraga, CA
November 13, 2017*; 10:00 pm		at San Francisco	L 63–75	0–2	War Memorial Gymnasium (1,018); San Francisco, CA
November 18, 2017*; 3:00 pm		at Longwood	W 83–56	1–2	Willett Hall (1,317); Farmville, VA
November 21, 2017*; 7:00 pm		Franciscan	W 96–54	2–2	DeGol Arena (676); Loretto, PA
November 24, 2017*; 7:00 pm, ACCN Extra		at No. 19 Louisville	L 72–84	2–3	KFC Yum! Center (17,524); Louisville, KY
November 29, 2017*; 7:00 pm		American	W 100–89	3–3	DeGol Arena (1,013); Loretto, PA
December 2, 2017*; 7:00 pm		at Stony Brook	L 83–85	3–4	Island Federal Credit Union Arena (2,123); Stony Brook, NY
December 5, 2017*; 9:00 pm, ESPNU		at No. 1 Duke	L 67–124	3–5	Cameron Indoor Stadium (9,314); Durham, NC
December 10, 2017*; 2:00 pm, LCTV		at Niagara	W 93–87 ^{OT}	4–5	Gallagher Center; Lewiston, NY
December 18, 2017*; 7:00 pm		Bethany	W 113–77	5–5	DeGol Arena (424); Loretto, PA
December 21, 2017*; 7:00 pm		Lehigh	W 84–70	6–5	DeGol Arena (672); Loretto, PA
NEC regular season
December 29, 2017; 7:30 pm		at Central Connecticut	L 68–72	6–6 (0–1)	William H. Detrick Gymnasium (1,219); New Britain, CT
December 31, 2017; 3:00 pm		at Bryant	W 86–82 ^{OT}	7–6 (1–1)	Chace Athletic Center (416); Smithfield, RI
January 4, 2018; 7:00 pm		LIU Brooklyn	W 85–68	8–6 (2–1)	DeGol Arena (409); Loretto, PA
January 6, 2018; 4:00 pm		St. Francis Brooklyn	W 91–87	9–6 (3–1)	DeGol Arena (712); Loretto, PA
January 11, 2018; 7:00 pm, ESPN3		at Robert Morris	W 89–80	10–6 (4–1)	PPG Paints Arena (718); Pittsburgh, PA
January 13, 2018; 2:00 pm		Mount St. Mary's	L 80–81 ^{OT}	10–7 (4–2)	DeGol Arena (954); Loretto, PA
January 18, 2018; 7:00 pm		at Wagner	L 64–73	10–8 (4–3)	Spiro Sports Center (1,541); Staten Island, NY
January 20, 2018; 3:30 pm		at Sacred Heart	W 73–60	11–8 (5–3)	William H. Pitt Center (293); Fairfield, CT
January 26, 2018; 5:00 pm, ESPNU		Wagner	L 61–91	11–9 (5–4)	DeGol Arena (1,408); Loretto, PA
January 28, 2018; 2:00 pm		Sacred Heart	W 72–71	12–9 (6–4)	DeGol Arena (739); Loretto, PA
February 1, 2018; 6:00 pm, CBSSN		Fairleigh Dickinson	W 74–60	13–9 (7–4)	DeGol Arena (742); Loretto, PA
February 3, 2018; 4:00 pm		at Mount St. Mary's	L 56–69	13–10 (7–5)	Knott Arena (3,045); Emmitsburg, MD
February 8, 2018; 7:00 pm		at LIU Brooklyn	L 67–83	13–11 (7–6)	Steinberg Wellness Center (723); Brooklyn, NY
February 10, 2018; 4:00 pm		at St. Francis Brooklyn	W 90–65	14–11 (8–6)	Generoso Pope Athletic Complex (405); Brooklyn, NY
February 15, 2018; 7:00 pm		Central Connecticut	W 77–71 ^{OT}	15–11 (9–6)	DeGol Arena (1,012); Loretto, PA
February 17, 2018; 3:00 pm		Bryant	W 89–56	16–11 (10–6)	DeGol Arena (1,610); Loretto, PA
February 22, 2018; 6:00 pm		at Fairleigh Dickinson	W 90–82	17–11 (11–6)	Rothman Center (416); Hackensack, NJ
February 24, 2018; 2:00 pm		Robert Morris	W 80-60	18–11 (12–6)	DeGol Arena (416); Loretto, PA
NEC tournament
February 28, 2018; 7:00 pm	(3)	(6) Fairleigh Dickinson; Quarterfinals	L 75–84	18–12	DeGol Arena (1,051); Loretto, PA
CIT
March 14, 2018*; 8:00 pm		at UIC; First round	L 61–84	18–13	UIC Pavilion (1,137); Chicago, IL
*Non-conference game. ^{#}Rankings from AP Poll. (#) Tournament seedings in parentheses. All times are in Eastern Time. Source.
