= 2017–18 Sacred Heart Pioneers men's basketball team =

American college basketball season

2017–18 Sacred Heart Pioneers men's basketball
- Conference: Northeast Conference
- Record: 10–21 (5–13 NEC)
- Head coach: Anthony Latina (5th season)
- Assistant coaches: Johnny Kidd; Kevin Papacs; Kyle Steinway
- Home arena: William H. Pitt Center

2017–18 Northeast Conference men's basketball standings
	Conf.				Overall
Team	W		L	PCT	W		L	PCT
Wagner	14	–	4	.778	23	–	10	.697
Saint Francis (PA)	12	–	6	.667	18	–	13	.581
Mount St. Mary's	12	–	6	.667	18	–	14	.563
LIU Brooklyn †	10	–	8	.556	18	–	17	.514
St. Francis Brooklyn	10	–	8	.556	13	–	18	.419
Robert Morris	9	–	9	.500	16	–	17	.485
Fairleigh Dickinson	9	–	9	.500	13	–	18	.419
Central Connecticut	7	–	11	.389	14	–	18	.438
Sacred Heart	5	–	13	.278	10	–	21	.323
Bryant	2	–	16	.111	3	–	28	.097
† 2018 NEC tournament winner

The 2017–18 Sacred Heart Pioneers men's basketball team represented Sacred Heart University during the 2017–18 NCAA Division I men's basketball season. This was the Pioneers' 19th season of NCAA Division I basketball, all played in the Northeast Conference. The Pioneers were led by fifth-year head coach Anthony Latina and played their home games at the William H. Pitt Center in Fairfield, Connecticut. They finished the season 10–21, 5–13 in NEC play to finish in ninth place, failing to make the NEC tournament.

== Previous season ==
The Pioneers finished the 2016–17 season 13–19, 8–10 in NEC play to finish in eighth place. They lost in the quarterfinals of the NEC tournament to Mount St. Mary's.

== Preseason ==
In a poll of league coaches at the NEC media day, the Pioneers were picked to finish in fifth place. Senior forward Joseph Lopez was named the preseason All-NEC team.

== Roster ==
2017–18 Sacred Heart Pioneers men's basketball team
Players
Coaches

Pos.	#	Name	Height	Weight	Year	Hometown
F	13	Cavan LaRose	6 ft 3 in (1.91 m)	185 lb (84 kg)	GS	Ogdensburg, New York
F	5	De'von Barnett	6 ft 5 in (1.96 m)	195 lb (88 kg)	RS Sr	Waldorf, Maryland
G	10	Charles Tucker Jr.	6 ft 1 in (1.85 m)	188 lb (85 kg)	RS Sr	Lansing, Michigan
F	31	Mario Matasovic	6 ft 8 in (2.03 m)	215 lb (98 kg)	RS Sr	Gornja Vrba, Croatia
G	14	Chris Robinson	6 ft 3 in (1.91 m)	165 lb (75 kg)	Sr	Bronx, New York
F	21	Joseph Lopez	6 ft 7 in (2.01 m)	220 lb (100 kg)	Sr	Miami, Florida
G	22	Sean Hoehn	6 ft 2 in (1.88 m)	182 lb (83 kg)	Jr	Morristown, New Jersey
F	25	Jarel Spellman	6 ft 10 in (2.08 m)	205 lb (93 kg)	Jr	Glen Allen, Virginia
G	30	Kinnon LaRose	6 ft 3 in (1.91 m)	185 lb (84 kg)	RS So	Ogdensburg, New York
G	2	Zach Radz	6 ft 2 in (1.88 m)	185 lb (84 kg)	So	Watervliet, New York
F	24	E.J. Anosike	6 ft 7 in (2.01 m)	235 lb (107 kg)	Fr	East Orange, New Jersey
G	11	Jaecee Martin	5 ft 9 in (1.75 m)	180 lb (82 kg)	Fr	Hartford, Connecticut
G	4	Alex Watson	6 ft 3 in (1.91 m)	170 lb (77 kg)	Fr	Marietta, Georgia
G	1	Anthony Boateng	5 ft 9 in (1.75 m)	150 lb (68 kg)	Fr	Bronx, New York

Head coach

- Anthony Latina (Brandeis)

Assistant coach(es)

- Johnny Kidd (Central Connecticut State)
- Kevin Papacs (Central Connecticut State)
- Kyle Steinway (Providence)

Legend

- (C) Team captain
- (S) Suspended
- (I) Ineligible
- (W) Walk-on
- Injured
- Current redshirt

Roster

== Schedule and results ==
Date time, TV	Opponent	Result	Record	Site (attendance) city, state
Non-conference regular season
November 10, 2017*; 6:00 pm	Holy Cross	L 64–69	0–1	William H. Pitt Center (1,062); Fairfield, CT
November 14, 2017*; 7:00 pm, ACCN Extra	at Boston College; Hall of Fame Tip Off	L 53–73	0–2	Conte Forum (643); Chestnut Hill, MA
November 18, 2017*; 7:30 pm, ESPN3	vs. Saint Peter's; Hall of Fame Tip Off	L 61–70	0–3	Mohegan Sun Arena (3,545); Uncasville, CT
November 19, 2017*; 12:30 pm	vs. Maine; Hall of Fame Tip Off consolation	L 68–69 ^{OT}	1–3	Mohegan Sun Arena; Uncasville, CT
November 22, 2017*; 1:00 pm	Mitchell	W 84–60	2–3	William H. Pitt Center; Fairfield, CT
November 24, 2017*; 8:30 pm, BTN+	at Northwestern; Hall of Fame Tip Off	L 50–81	2–4	Allstate Arena (5,216); Rosemont, IL
November 29, 2017*; 7:00 pm, ESPN3	at UMass Lowell	W 87–80	3–4	Costello Athletic Center (884); Lowell, MA
December 2, 2017*; 4:30 pm, FS1	at St. John's	L 55–90	3–5	Carnesecca Arena (4,643); Queens, NY
December 5, 2017*; 6:00 pm	Dartmouth	W 79–73	4–5	William H. Pitt Center (375); Fairfield, CT
December 9, 2017*; 3:30 pm	Lafayette	W 62–50	5–5	William H. Pitt Center; Fairfield, CT
December 11, 2017*; 7:00 pm, ESPN3	at Hartford	L 72–86	5–6	Chase Arena at Reich Family Pavilion (1,182); Hartford, CT
December 17, 2017*; 1:00 pm	Binghamton	L 48–51	5–7	William H. Pitt Center (176); Fairfield, CT
December 22, 2017*; 6:30 pm, FS1	at Providence	L 75–89	5–8	Dunkin' Donuts Center (6,452); Providence, RI
NEC Regular season
December 29, 2017; 3:30 pm	St. Francis Brooklyn	L 68–73	5–9 (0–1)	William H. Pitt Center; Fairfield, CT
December 31, 2017; 2:30 pm	Fairleigh Dickinson	W 66–65	6–9 (1–1)	William H. Pitt Center; Fairfield, CT
January 4, 2018; 7:00 pm	at Wagner	L 63–69	6–10 (1–2)	Spiro Sports Center (273); Staten Island, NY
January 6, 2018; 1:00 pm	Bryant	L 74–79	6–11 (1–3)	William H. Pitt Center (210); Fairfield, CT
January 11, 2018; 7:00 pm	at Mount St. Mary's	L 75–81	6–12 (1–4)	Knott Arena (1,448); Emmitsburg, MD
January 13, 2018; 4:00 pm	at St. Francis Brooklyn	W 92–52	7–12 (2–4)	Generoso Pope Athletic Complex (328); Brooklyn, NY
January 18, 2018; 6:00 pm	Robert Morris	L 60–74	7–13 (2–5)	William H. Pitt Center (324); Fairfield, CT
January 20, 2018; 1:00 pm	Saint Francis (PA)	L 60–73	7–14 (2–6)	William H. Pitt Center (293); Fairfield, CT
January 26, 2018; 7:00 pm	at Robert Morris	L 56-64	7-15 (2-7)	PPG Paints Arena (636); Pittsburgh, PA
January 28, 2018; 2:00 pm	at Saint Francis (PA)	L 71–72	7–16 (2–8)	DeGol Arena (739); Loretto, PA
February 1, 2018; 9:00 pm, ESPNU	LIU Brooklyn	L 60–69	7–17 (2–9)	William H. Pitt Center (1,522); Fairfield, CT
February 3, 2018; 3:30 pm	Central Connecticut	W 67–54	8–17 (3–9)	William H. Pitt Center (612); Fairfield, CT
February 8, 2018; 7:00 pm	at Fairleigh Dickinson	L 67–77	8–18 (3–10)	Rothman Center (392); Hackensack, NJ
February 10, 2018; 4:00 pm, ESPN3	at Central Connecticut	W 67–50	9–18 (4–10)	William H. Detrick Gymnasium (1,615); New Britain, CT
February 15, 2018; 6:00 pm	Wagner	L 84–99	9–19 (4–11)	William H. Pitt Center (206); Fairfield, CT
February 17, 2018; 1:00 pm	Mount St. Mary's	L 69–74	9–20 (4–12)	William H. Pitt Center (404); Fairfield, CT
February 22, 2018; 7:00 pm	at Bryant	W 94–84	10–20 (5–12)	Chace Athletic Center (646); Smithfield, RI
February 24, 2018; 2:00 pm	at LIU Brooklyn	W 88–77	10–21 (5–13)	Steinberg Wellness Center (637); Brooklyn, NY
*Non-conference game. ^{#}Rankings from AP Poll. (#) Tournament seedings in parentheses. All times are in Eastern Time..
