= 2017–18 Wagner Seahawks men's basketball team =

American college basketball season

2017–18 Wagner Seahawks men's basketball
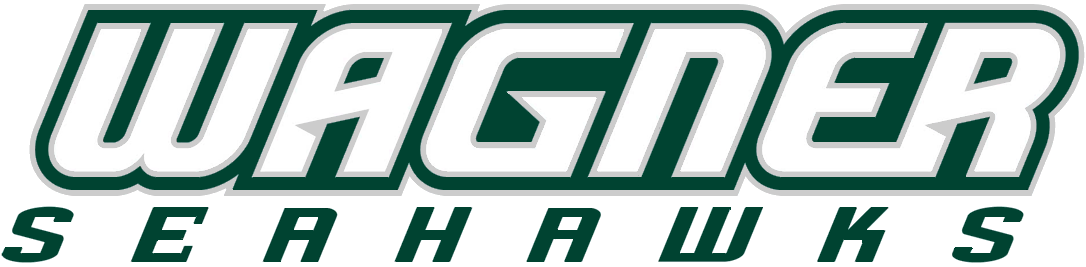

NEC regular season champions

NIT, First round
- Conference: Northeast Conference
- Record: 23–10 (14–4 NEC)
- Head coach: Bashir Mason (6th season)
- Associate head coach: Mike Babul
- Assistant coaches: Donald Copeland; Scott Smith
- Home arena: Spiro Sports Center

2017–18 Northeast Conference men's basketball standings
	Conf.				Overall
Team	W		L	PCT	W		L	PCT
Wagner	14	–	4	.778	23	–	10	.697
Saint Francis (PA)	12	–	6	.667	18	–	13	.581
Mount St. Mary's	12	–	6	.667	18	–	14	.563
LIU Brooklyn †	10	–	8	.556	18	–	17	.514
St. Francis Brooklyn	10	–	8	.556	13	–	18	.419
Robert Morris	9	–	9	.500	16	–	17	.485
Fairleigh Dickinson	9	–	9	.500	13	–	18	.419
Central Connecticut	7	–	11	.389	14	–	18	.438
Sacred Heart	5	–	13	.278	10	–	21	.323
Bryant	2	–	16	.111	3	–	28	.097
† 2018 NEC tournament winner

The 2017–18 Wagner Seahawks men's basketball team represented Wagner College during the 2017–18 NCAA Division I men's basketball season. The Seahawks were led by sixth-year head coach Bashir Mason. They played their home games at Spiro Sports Center on the school's Staten Island campus as members of the Northeast Conference. The Seahwawks finished the season 23–10, 14–4 in NEC play to win the NEC regular season championship. In the NEC tournament, they defeated Central Connecticut and Robert Morris before losing to LIU Brooklyn in the championship game. As a regular season conference champion who did not win their conference tournament, they received an invitation to the National Invitation Tournament where they lost in the first round to Baylor.

== Previous season ==
The Seahawks finished the 2016–17 season 16–14 overall and 11–7 in NEC play to finish in a tie for third place. In the NEC tournament, they beat Fairleigh Dickinson before losing to Saint Francis (PA) in the semifinals.

== Preseason ==
In a poll of league coaches at the NEC media day, the Seahawks were picked to finish in third place.

== Roster ==
2017–18 Wagner Seahawks men's basketball team
Players
Coaches

Pos.	#	Name	Height	Weight	Year	Hometown
F	23	Nick Madray	6 ft 9 in (2.06 m)	230 lb (104 kg)	GS	Mississauga, Ontario
F	1	Shack Scott	6 ft 7 in (2.01 m)	215 lb (98 kg)	Sr	Paterson, New Jersey
G	5	JoJo Cooper	6 ft 0 in (1.83 m)	190 lb (86 kg)	Sr	Wilmington, Delaware
G	11	Romone Saunders	6 ft 3 in (1.91 m)	200 lb (91 kg)	RS Jr	Temple Hills, Maryland
F	4	AJ Sumbry	6 ft 8 in (2.03 m)	230 lb (104 kg)	RS Jr	East Windsor, New Jersey
G	21	Elijah Davis	6 ft 4 in (1.93 m)	215 lb (98 kg)	Jr	Bronx, New York
G	24	Devin Liggeons	6 ft 3 in (1.91 m)	190 lb (86 kg)	Jr	Philadelphia, Pennsylvania
F	5	Lonnie Rivera	6 ft 6 in (1.98 m)	195 lb (88 kg)	Jr	Spring Valley, New York
F	13	Tim Graham	6 ft 6 in (1.98 m)	190 lb (86 kg)	Jr	Portland, Oregon
G	3	Blake Francis	6 ft 0 in (1.83 m)	165 lb (75 kg)	So	Herndon, Virginia
F	15	Jamar Brown	6 ft 8 in (2.03 m)	250 lb (113 kg)	RS Fr	Harlem, New York
F	0	Nigel Jackson	6 ft 7 in (2.01 m)	215 lb (98 kg)	Fr	Baltimore, Maryland
G	2	Tyler Plummer	6 ft 3 in (1.91 m)	200 lb (91 kg)	Fr	Vaughan, Ontario
G	12	Chase Freeman	5 ft 11 in (1.8 m)	165 lb (75 kg)	Fr	Gallatin, Tennessee

Head coach

- Bashir Mason (Drexel)

Assistant coach(es)

- Mike Babul (Massachusetts)
- Donald Copeland (Seton Hall)
- Scott Smith (Seton Hall)

Legend

- (C) Team captain
- (S) Suspended
- (I) Ineligible
- (W) Walk-on
- Injured
- Current redshirt

Roster

== Schedule and results ==
Date time, TV	Rank^{#}	Opponent^{#}	Result	Record	High points	High rebounds	High assists	Site (attendance) city, state
Non-conference regular season
Nov 11, 2017*; 6:00 pm, ESPN3		at NJIT	W 60–49	1–0	22 – Francis	10 – Davis	6 – Cooper	Wellness and Events Center (2,907); Newark, NJ
Nov 13, 2017*; 9:00 pm, ESPN2		at Missouri	L 55–99	1–1	17 – Francis	8 – Liggeons	2 – Cooper	Mizzou Arena (15,061); Columbia, MO
Nov 18, 2017*; 2:00 pm		American	W 71–70	2–1	24 – Francis	9 – Sumbry	4 – Cooper	Spiro Sports Center (1,128); Staten Island, NY
Nov 21, 2017*; 7:00 pm		Staten Island	W 107–64	3–1	20 – Cooper	14 – Jackson	5 – Tied	Spiro Sports Center (891); Staten Island, NY
Nov 26, 2017*; 2:00 pm, ESPN3		at Hartford	W 72–50	4–1	17 – Francis	6 – Liggeons	8 – Cooper	Chase Arena at Reich Family Pavilion (730); Hartford, CT
Dec 1, 2017*; 7:00 pm		Fairfield	W 78–76	5–1	19 – Francis	10 – Sumbry	8 – Cooper	Spiro Sports Center (793); Staten Island, NY
Dec 5, 2017*; 7:00 pm		UMass Lowell	W 90–72	6–1	20 – Tied	7 – Tied	13 – Cooper	Spiro Sports Center (917); Staten Island, NY
Dec 10, 2017*; 4:00 pm		Mercy	W 75–41	7–1	19 – Francis	10 – Liggeons	5 – Francis	Spiro Sports Center (871); Staten Island, NY
Dec 16, 2017*; 2:00 pm		at Rider	L 84–90 ^{OT}	7–2	25 – Francis	13 – Sumbry	11 – Cooper	Alumni Gymnasium (1,328); Lawrenceville, NJ
Dec 20, 2017*; 7:00 pm, FS1		at No. 23 Seton Hall	L 68–89	7–3	15 – Cooper	7 – Cooper	4 – Cooper	Prudential Center (6,481); Newark, NJ
Dec 23, 2017*; 3:00 pm, NBCSN		at Dayton	L 67–79	7–4	24 – Francis	10 – Sumbry	4 – Cooper	UD Arena (12,878); Dayton, OH
NEC regular season
Dec 29, 2017; 7:00 pm		Mount St. Mary's	W 76–57	8–4 (1–0)	18 – Francis	10 – Davis	10 – Cooper	Spiro Sports Center (1,722); Staten Island, NY
Dec 31, 2017; 1:00 pm		at St. Francis Brooklyn	L 75–82	8–5 (1–1)	23 – Francis	12 – Cooper	4 – Cooper	Generoso Pope Athletic Complex (407); Brooklyn, NY
Jan 4, 2018; 7:00 pm		Sacred Heart	W 69–63	9–5 (2–1)	24 – Saunders	11 – Sumbry	5 – Cooper	Spiro Sports Center (273); Staten Island, NY
Jan 6, 2018; 4:00 pm		Fairleigh Dickinson	W 73–65	10–5 (3–1)	20 – Cooper	8 – Tied	7 – Cooper	Spiro Sports Center (817); Staten Island, NY
Jan 11, 2018; 7:00 pm		at Bryant	W 71–62	11–5 (4–1)	23 – Cooper	11 – Tied	3 – Tied	Chace Athletic Center (609); Smithfield, RI
Jan 13, 2018; 4:30 pm		at LIU Brooklyn	L 67–69	11–6 (4–2)	18 – Saunders	6 – Tied	4 – Tied	Steinberg Wellness Center (753); Brooklyn, NY
Jan 18, 2018; 7:00 pm		Saint Francis (PA)	W 73–64	12–6 (5–2)	17 – Cooper	12 – Liggeons	10 – Cooper	Spiro Sports Center (1,541); Staten Island, NY
Jan 20, 2018; 4:00 pm		Robert Morris	W 62–49	13–6 (6–2)	19 – Francis	12 – Cooper	8 – Cooper	Spiro Sports Center (1,784); Staten Island, NY
Jan 26, 2018; 5:00 pm, ESPNU		at Saint Francis (PA)	W 91–61	14–6 (7–2)	30 – Saunders	7 – Saunders	8 – Cooper	DeGol Arena (1,408); Loretto, PA
Jan 28, 2018; 2:00 pm		at Robert Morris	W 77–64	15–6 (8–2)	21 – Francis	12 – Saunders	9 – Cooper	PPG Paints Arena (1,029); Pittsburgh, PA
Feb 1, 2018; 7:00 pm		Central Connecticut	W 72–59	16–6 (9–2)	15 – Tied	7 – Sumbry	12 – Cooper	Spiro Sports Center (1,483); Staten Island, NY
Feb 3, 2018; 4:00 pm		St. Francis Brooklyn	W 79–61	17–6 (10–2)	15 – Francis	11 – Sumbry	8 – Cooper	Spiro Sports Center (1,923); Staten Island, NY
Feb 8, 2018; 7:00 pm, CBSSN		Bryant	W 96–76	18–6 (11–2)	29 – Francis	7 – Davis	6 – Saunders	Spiro Sports Center (1,997); Staten Island, NY
Feb 11, 2018; 7:00 pm, CBSSN		at Fairleigh Dickinson	L 69–76	18–7 (11–3)	25 – Saunders	10 – Sumbry	8 – Cooper	Rothman Center (1,731); Hackensack, NJ
Feb 15, 2018; 6:00 pm		at Sacred Heart	W 99–84	19–7 (12–3)	23 – Cooper	7 – Cooper	6 – Tied	William H. Pitt Center (206); Fairfield, CT
Feb 17, 2018; 4:00 pm		LIU Brooklyn	W 78–74	20–7 (13–3)	18 – Cooper	5 – Tied	6 – Cooper	Spiro Sports Center (1,933); Staten Island, NY
Feb 22, 2018; 7:00 pm		at Central Connecticut	W 64–62	21–7 (14–3)	14 – Saunders	8 – Sumbry	4 – Cooper	William H. Detrick Gymnasium (1,217); New Britain, CT
Feb 24, 2018; 4:00 pm		at Mount St. Mary's	L 62–73	21–8 (14–4)	18 – Cooper	17 – Saunders	2 – Cooper	Knott Arena (3,072); Emmitsburg, MD
NEC tournament
Feb 28, 2018; 7:00 pm	(1)	(8) Central Connecticut; Quarterfinals	W 73–61	22–8	20 – Cooper	10 – Saunders	7 – Cooper	Spiro Sports Center (1,838); Staten Island, NY
Mar 3, 2018; 12:00 pm, ESPN3	(1)	(7) Robert Morris; Semifinals	W 75–64	23–8	20 – Cooper	8 – Tied	6 – Cooper	Spiro Sports Center (1,863); Staten Island, NY
Mar 6, 2018; 7:00 pm, ESPN	(1)	(4) LIU Brooklyn; Championship game	L 61–71	23–9	17 – Saunders	11 – Liggeons	8 – Cooper	Spiro Sports Center (2,330); Staten Island, NY
NIT
Mar 13, 2018*; 7:00 pm, ESPN2	(8)	at (1) Baylor; First round – Baylor Bracket	L 59–80	23–10	23 – Francis	8 – Saunders	5 – Saunders	Ferrell Center (1,988); Waco, TX
*Non-conference game. ^{#}Rankings from AP Poll. (#) Tournament seedings in parentheses. All times are in Eastern Time Source.
