= 2017–18 Central Connecticut Blue Devils men's basketball team =

American college basketball season

2017–18 Central Connecticut Blue Devils men's basketball
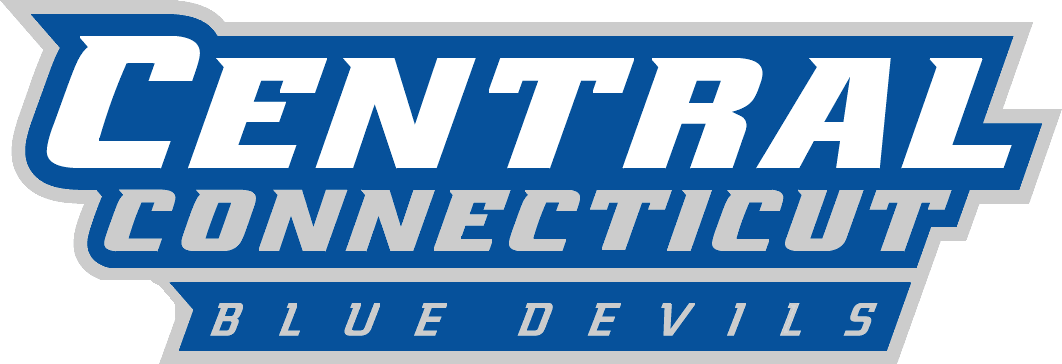
- Conference: Northeast Conference
- Record: 14–18 (7–11 NEC)
- Head coach: Donyell Marshall (2nd season)
- Assistant coaches: Mike Witcoskie; Anthony Anderson; Obie Nwadike
- Home arena: William H. Detrick Gymnasium

2017–18 Northeast Conference men's basketball standings
	Conf.				Overall
Team	W		L	PCT	W		L	PCT
Wagner	14	–	4	.778	23	–	10	.697
Saint Francis (PA)	12	–	6	.667	18	–	13	.581
Mount St. Mary's	12	–	6	.667	18	–	14	.563
LIU Brooklyn †	10	–	8	.556	18	–	17	.514
St. Francis Brooklyn	10	–	8	.556	13	–	18	.419
Robert Morris	9	–	9	.500	16	–	17	.485
Fairleigh Dickinson	9	–	9	.500	13	–	18	.419
Central Connecticut	7	–	11	.389	14	–	18	.438
Sacred Heart	5	–	13	.278	10	–	21	.323
Bryant	2	–	16	.111	3	–	28	.097
† 2018 NEC tournament winner

The 2017–18 Central Connecticut Blue Devils men's basketball team represented Central Connecticut State University during the 2017–18 NCAA Division I men's basketball season. The Blue Devils, led by second-year head coach Donyell Marshall, played their home games at the William H. Detrick Gymnasium in New Britain, Connecticut as members of the Northeast Conference. They finished the season 14–18, 7–11 in NEC play to finish in eight place. They lost in the first round of the NEC tournament to Wagner.

== Previous season ==
The Blue Devils finished the 2016–17 season 6–23, 4–14 in NEC play to finish in ninth place. They failed to qualify for the NEC tournament.

== Preseason ==
In a poll of league coaches at the NEC media day, the Blue Devils were picked to finish in ninth place.

== Roster ==
2017–18 Central Connecticut Blue Devils men's basketball team
Players
Coaches

Pos.	#	Name	Height	Weight	Year	Hometown
G	15	Shakaris Laney	6 ft 4 in (1.93 m)	200 lb (91 kg)	Sr	Philadelphia, Pennsylvania
F	3	Mustafa Jones	6 ft 7 in (2.01 m)	180 lb (82 kg)	Sr	Harlem, New York
G	5	Eric Bowles	6 ft 0 in (1.83 m)	180 lb (82 kg)	Jr	Fairfax, Virginia
G	10	Austin Nehls	6 ft 3 in (1.91 m)	185 lb (84 kg)	Jr	Tucson, Arizona
G/F	1	Tyler Kohl	6 ft 5 in (1.96 m)	220 lb (100 kg)	Jr	Allentown, Pennsylvania
C	14	Deion Bute	6 ft 9 in (2.06 m)	220 lb (100 kg)	Jr	Philipsburg, Sint Maarten
F	21	Joe Hugley	6 ft 7 in (2.01 m)	215 lb (98 kg)	Jr	Gaithersburg, Maryland
F/C	0	Harrison Kay	6 ft 11 in (2.11 m)	240 lb (109 kg)	So	Covina Hills, California
G	13	Tyson Batiste	6 ft 2 in (1.88 m)	170 lb (77 kg)	So	Springfield, Missouri
G/F	24	Chris Williams	6 ft 6 in (1.98 m)	170 lb (77 kg)	So	Chicago, Illinois
F	30	Donyell Marshall, Jr.	6 ft 6 in (1.98 m)	175 lb (79 kg)	So	Pepper Pike, Ohio
F	2	Kashaun Hicks	6 ft 6 in (1.98 m)	195 lb (88 kg)	RS Fr	Jersey City, New Jersey
G	11	Eduardo Camacho	6 ft 1 in (1.85 m)	175 lb (79 kg)	Fr	Miami, Florida
G	23	Talek Williams	6 ft 3 in (1.91 m)	192 lb (87 kg)	Fr	Allentown, Pennsylvania

Head coach

- Donyell Marshall (Connecticut)

Assistant coach(es)

- Anthony Anderson (McNeese State)
- Mike Witcoskie (Susquehanna)
- Anthony Ross (East Stroudsburg)

Legend

- (C) Team captain
- (S) Suspended
- (I) Ineligible
- (W) Walk-on
- Injured
- Current redshirt

Roster

== Schedule and results ==
Date time, TV	Rank^{#}	Opponent^{#}	Result	Record	Site (attendance) city, state
Exhibition
Nov 2, 2017*; 8:00 pm		Nyack	W 65–62		William H. Detrick Gymnasium; New Britain, CT
Non-conference regular season
Nov 10, 2017*; 7:30 pm, ESPN3		at Hartford; Rivalry	L 84–85 ^{OT}	0–1	Chase Arena at Reich Family Pavilion (2,216); Hartford, CT
Nov 12, 2017*; 2:30 pm, BTN Plus		at Rutgers; Showcase on the Banks	L 67–71	0–2	Louis Brown Athletic Center (3,844); Piscataway, NJ
Nov 14, 2017*; 6:30 pm, FS2		at St. John's	L 55–80	0–3	Carnesecca Arena (4,043); Queens, NY
Nov 17, 2017*; 7:00 pm, ESPN3		at East Carolina; Showcase on the Banks	W 79–68	1–3	Williams Arena at Minges Coliseum (3,042); Greenville, NC
Nov 21, 2017*; 7:00pm		Coppin State; Showcase on the Banks	W 74–71 ^{OT}	2–3	William H. Detrick Gymnasium; New Britain, CT
Nov 24, 2017*; 5:00 pm, ESPN3		at Cleveland State	W 74–73	3–3	Wolstein Center (1,121); Cleveland, OH
Nov 30, 2017*; 7:00 pm		North Carolina A&T	W 72–59	4–3	William H. Detrick Gymnasium (1,514); New Britain, CT
Dec 2, 2017*; 2:00 pm		at Brown	W 68–62	5–3	Pizzitola Sports Center; Providence, RI
Dec 6, 2017*; 9:00 pm, FS1		at DePaul	L 57–85	5–4	Wintrust Arena (4,458); Chicago, IL
Dec 9, 2017*; 1:00 pm, ESPN3		at Northern Illinois	L 55–61	5–5	NIU Convocation Center (641); DeKalb, IL
Dec 17, 2017*; 1:00 pm, ACCN Extra		at Boston College	L 65–84	5–6	Conte Forum (4,669); Chestnut Hill, MA
Dec 20, 2017*; 7:00 pm		Maine	W 84–57	6–6	William H. Detrick Gymnasium; New Britain, CT
Dec 23, 2017*; 1:00 pm, ESPN3		at UMass Lowell	W 76–73	7–6	Tsongas Center; Lowell, MA
NEC regular season
Dec 29, 2017; 7:30pm		Saint Francis (PA)	W 72–68	8–6 (1–0)	William H. Detrick Gymnasium (1,219); New Britain, CT
Dec 31, 2017; 3:30pm		Robert Morris	L 57–71	8–7 (1–1)	William H. Detrick Gymnasium (1,214); New Britain, CT
Jan 4, 2018; 7:00pm		at Fairleigh Dickinson	L 77–81	8–8 (1–2)	Rothman Center (117); Hackensack, NJ
Jan 6, 2018; 4:00 pm		at Mount St. Mary's	L 51–78	8–9 (1–3)	Knott Arena (2,384); Emmitsburg, MD
Jan 11, 2018; 7:00pm		at St. Francis Brooklyn	L 60–77	8–10 (1–4)	Generoso Pope Athletic Complex (364); Brooklyn, NY
Jan 13, 2018; 3:30 pm		Bryant	W 80–76	9–10 (2–4)	William H. Detrick Gymnasium; New Britain, CT
Jan 18, 2018; 7:00 pm		Fairleigh Dickinson	W 66–65	10–10 (3–4)	William H. Detrick Gymnasium (1,679); New Britain, CT
Jan 20, 2018; 3:30 pm		LIU Brooklyn	W 72–63	11–10 (4–4)	William H. Detrick Gymnasium (1,615); New Britain, CT
Jan 25, 2018; 7:00 pm, ESPN3		at Bryant	W 80–74	12–10 (5–4)	Chace Athletic Center; Smithfield, RI
Jan 27, 2018; 4:30 pm		at LIU Brooklyn	L 89–94 ^{OT}	12–11 (5–5)	Steinberg Wellness Center (827); Brooklyn, NY
Feb 1, 2018; 7:00 pm		at Wagner	L 59–72	12–12 (5–6)	Spiro Sports Center (1,483); Staten Island, NY
Feb 3, 2018; 3:30 pm		at Sacred Heart	L 54–67	12–13 (5–7)	William H. Pitt Center (612); Fairfield, CT
Feb 8, 2018; 7:00pm		Mount St. Mary's	L 57–71	12–14 (5–8)	William H. Detrick Gymnasium; New Britain, CT
Feb 10, 2018; 4:00 pm, ESPN3		Sacred Heart	L 50–67	12–15 (5–9)	William H. Detrick Gymnasium (1,615); New Britain, CT
Feb 15, 2018; 7:00 pm		at Saint Francis (PA)	L 71–77 ^{OT}	12–16 (5–10)	DeGol Arena (1,012); Loretto, PA
Feb 17, 2018; 7:00 pm		at Robert Morris	W 65–58	13–16 (6–10)	A. J. Palumbo Center (668); Pittsburgh, PA
Feb 22, 2018; 7:00 pm		Wagner	L 62–64	13–17 (6–11)	William H. Detrick Gymnasium (1,217); New Britain, CT
Feb 24, 2018; 3:30 pm		St. Francis Brooklyn	W 78–75 ^{OT}	14–17 (7–11)	William H. Detrick Gymnasium (1,849); New Britain, CT
NEC tournament
Feb 28, 2018; 7:00 pm	(8)	at (1) Wagner; Quarterfinals	L 61–73	14–18	Spiro Sports Center (1,838); Staten Island, NY
*Non-conference game. ^{#}Rankings from AP Poll. (#) Tournament seedings in parentheses. All times are in Eastern Time.
