= 2017–18 Rutgers Scarlet Knights men's basketball team =

American college basketball season

2017–18 Rutgers Scarlet Knights men's basketball
- Conference: Big Ten Conference
- Record: 15–19 (3–15 Big Ten)
- Head coach: Steve Pikiell (2nd season)
- Assistant coaches: Karl Hobbs; Brandin Knight; Jay Young
- Home arena: Louis Brown Athletic Center

2017–18 Big Ten Conference men's basketball standings
	Conf.				Overall
Team	W		L	PCT	W		L	PCT
No. 5 Michigan State	16	–	2	.889	30	–	5	.857
No. 11 Purdue	15	–	3	.833	30	–	7	.811
No. 17 Ohio State	15	–	3	.833	25	–	9	.735
No. 7 Michigan †	13	–	5	.722	33	–	8	.805
Nebraska	13	–	5	.722	22	–	11	.667
Penn State	9	–	9	.500	26	–	13	.667
Indiana	9	–	9	.500	16	–	15	.516
Maryland	8	–	10	.444	19	–	13	.594
Wisconsin	7	–	11	.389	15	–	18	.455
Northwestern	6	–	12	.333	15	–	17	.469
Minnesota	4	–	14	.222	15	–	17	.469
Illinois	4	–	14	.222	14	–	18	.438
Iowa	4	–	14	.222	14	–	19	.424
Rutgers	3	–	15	.167	15	–	19	.441
† 2018 Big Ten tournament winner Rankings from AP poll

The 2017–18 Rutgers Scarlet Knights men's basketball team represented Rutgers University–New Brunswick during the 2017–18 NCAA Division I men's basketball season. The Scarlet Knights, led by second-year head coach Steve Pikiell, played their home games at the Louis Brown Athletic Center in Piscataway, New Jersey as fourth-year members of the Big Ten Conference. They finished the season 15–19, 3–15 in Big Ten play to finish in last place. In the Big Ten tournament, they defeated Minnesota and Indiana before losing to Purdue in the quarterfinals.

== Previous season ==
The Knights finished the 2016–17 season 15–18, 3–15 in Big Ten play to finish in last place. In the Big Ten tournament, they defeated Ohio State in the first round, marking their first ever Big Ten tournament win. However, they lost to Northwestern in the second round.

== Offseason ==
=== Departures ===
Name	Number	Pos.	Height	Weight	Year	Hometown	Notes
Nigel Johnson	0	G	6'1"	190	RS Junior	Ashburn, VA	Transferred to Virginia
Jonathan Laurent	4	G	6'6"	216	Sophomore	Lakeland, FL	Transferred to Massachusetts
Khalil Batie	23	G	5'10"	168	Senior	Willingboro, NJ	Graduated
Ibrahima Diallo	32	F/C	6'10"	247	RS Sophomore	Dakar, Senegal	Transferred
C. J. Getty	50	C	7'0"	270	Senior	Findlay, OH	Graduated

=== Incoming transfers ===
Name	Number	Pos.	Height	Weight	Year	Hometown	Previous School
Peter Kiss	32	G	6'5"	215	Sophomore	New York City, NY	Quinnipiac
Soufiane Mensah	44	G	6'2"	210	Junior	Paris, France	Marshalltown Community College

=== 2017 recruiting class ===
College recruiting information
Name	Hometown	School	Height	Weight	Commit date
Geo Baker; PG	Derry, NH	Proctor Academy	6 ft 4 in (1.93 m)	170 lb (77 kg)	Jul 27, 2016
Geo Baker; PG	Recruit ratings: Scout: Rivals: 247Sports: ESPN:				
Myles Johnson; C	Long Beach, CA	Long Beach Polytechnic High School	6 ft 6 in (1.98 m)	210 lb (95 kg)	May 14, 2017
Myles Johnson; C	Recruit ratings: Scout: Rivals: 247Sports: ESPN:				
Mamadou Doucoure; C	Centereach, NY	Our Savior New American School	6 ft 9 in (2.06 m)	220 lb (100 kg)	Dec 20, 2016
Mamadou Doucoure; C	Recruit ratings: Scout: Rivals: 247Sports: ESPN:				
Overall recruit ranking:
Note: In many cases, Scout, Rivals, 247Sports, On3, and ESPN may conflict in their listings of height and weight.; In these cases, the average was taken. ESPN grades are on a 100-point scale.; Sources: "2017 Team Ranking". Rivals.

=== 2018 recruiting class ===
College recruiting information (2018)
Name	Hometown	School	Height	Weight	Commit date
Montez Mathis; SG	Essex, MD	John Carroll School	6 ft 4 in (1.93 m)	190 lb (86 kg)	Aug 4, 2017
Montez Mathis; SG	Recruit ratings: Scout: Rivals: 247Sports: ESPN:				
Ron Harper Jr. SG	Ramsey, NJ	Don Bosco Preparatory High School	6 ft 6 in (1.98 m)	200 lb (91 kg)	Aug 11, 2017
Ron Harper Jr. SG	Recruit ratings: Scout: Rivals: 247Sports: ESPN:				
Overall recruit ranking:
Note: In many cases, Scout, Rivals, 247Sports, On3, and ESPN may conflict in their listings of height and weight.; In these cases, the average was taken. ESPN grades are on a 100-point scale.; Sources: "2018 Team Ranking". Rivals.

== Roster ==
2017–18 Rutgers Scarlet Knights men's basketball team
Players
Coaches

Pos.	#	Name	Height	Weight	Year	Previous school	Hometown
G	0	Geo Baker	6 ft 4 in (1.93 m)	175 lb (79 kg)	Fr	Proctor Academy	Derry, NH
F	1	Candido Sá	6 ft 9 in (2.06 m)	227 lb (103 kg)	Sr	Colégio Bartolomeu Dias; San Jacinto College	Lisbon, Portugal
C	2	Shaquille Doorson	7 ft 0 in (2.13 m)	270 lb (122 kg)	RS Jr	Canarias Basketball Academy	Amsterdam, Netherlands
G	3	Corey Sanders	6 ft 2 in (1.88 m)	181 lb (82 kg)	Jr	Faith Baptist Christian Academy	Lakeland, FL
G	5	Mike Williams	6 ft 2 in (1.88 m)	198 lb (90 kg)	Sr	Bishop Loughlin	Brooklyn, NY
G	10	Jake Dadika (W)	6 ft 0 in (1.83 m)	165 lb (75 kg)	Sr	Spotswood	Milltown, NJ
F	11	Eugene Omoruyi	6 ft 6 in (1.98 m)	230 lb (104 kg)	So	Orangeville Prep	Rexdale, Canada
F	13	Matt Bullock	6 ft 4 in (1.93 m)	260 lb (118 kg)	So	Roselle Catholic	Elizabeth, NJ
F/C	15	Myles Johnson	6 ft 10 in (2.08 m)	245 lb (111 kg)	Fr	Long Beach Poly	Long Beach, CA
F/C	21	Mamadou Doucoure	6 ft 9 in (2.06 m)	243 lb (110 kg)	Fr	Our Savior New American School	Bamako, Mali
G	22	Joey Downes (W)	5 ft 11 in (1.8 m)	163 lb (74 kg)	So	East Sandwich/Bridgton Academy	East Sandwich, MA
F	24	Aaren Smith (W)	6 ft 6 in (1.98 m)	211 lb (96 kg)	So	Mount Hebron/Brewster Academy	Ellicott City, MD
G	32	Peter Kiss (redshirt)	6 ft 5 in (1.96 m)	195 lb (88 kg)	So	Notre Dame Prep; Qunnipiac	New York City, NY
F	33	Deshawn Freeman	6 ft 7 in (2.01 m)	225 lb (102 kg)	RS Sr	Rocky Mount Academy; Hutchinson CC	Rocky Mount, NC
F	35	Issa Thiam	6 ft 9 in (2.06 m)	190 lb (86 kg)	So	Canarias Basketball Academy	Dakar, Senegal
G	44	Souf Mensah	6 ft 2 in (1.88 m)	210 lb (95 kg)	Jr	CCI Nantes St-Nazaire; Mashalltown CC	Nantes, France
F/C	55	Luke Nathan (W)	6 ft 10 in (2.08 m)	220 lb (100 kg)	Fr	Randolph	Randolph, NJ

Head coach

- Steve Pikiell (Connecticut)

Assistant coach(es)

- Karl Hobbs (Connecticut)
- Brandin Knight (Pittsburgh)
- Jay Young (Marist)

Legend

- (C) Team captain
- (S) Suspended
- (I) Ineligible
- (W) Walk-on
- Injured
- Current redshirt

Roster

== Schedule and results ==
The 2018 Big Ten tournament will be held at Madison Square Garden in New York City. Due to the Big East's use of that venue for their conference tournament, the Big Ten tournament will take place one week earlier than usual, ending the week before Selection Sunday. This could result in teams having nearly two weeks off before the NCAA tournament.

Date time, TV	Rank^{#}	Opponent^{#}	Result	Record	High points	High rebounds	High assists	Site (attendance) city, state
Exhibition
November 5, 2017*; 1:00 pm, BTN Plus		St. John's; Disaster Relief Charity Exhibition	W 80–78		28 – Freeman	12 – Freeman	3 – Baker	Louis Brown Athletic Center (1,551); Piscataway, NJ
Regular season
November 10, 2017*; 7:00 pm, BTN Plus		CCNY	W 94–38	1–0	19 – Thiam	11 – Thiam	4 – Tied	Louis Brown Athletic Center (4,389); Piscataway, NJ
November 12, 2017*; 2:30 pm, BTN Plus		Central Connecticut; Showcase on the Banks	W 71–67	2–0	23 – Williams	7 – Tied	4 – Baker	Louis Brown Athletic Center (3,844); Piscataway, NJ
November 14, 2017*; 7:00 pm, BTN		Cleveland State; Showcase on the Banks	W 70–38	3–0	14 – Tied	10 – Sanders	7 – Baker	Louis Brown Athletic Center (3,292); Piscataway, NJ
November 19, 2017*; 12:30 pm, BTN Plus		Coppin State; Showcase on the Banks	W 64–39	4–0	19 – Omoruyi	8 – Tied	3 – Omoruyi	Louis Brown Athletic Center (3,514); Piscataway, NJ
November 21, 2017*; 7:00 pm, BTN Plus		Bryant	W 83–54	5–0	29 – Baker	8 – Omoruyi	5 – Sanders	Louis Brown Athletic Center (3,044); Piscataway, NJ
November 24, 2017*; 1:00 pm, BTN Plus		East Carolina; Showcase on the Banks	W 61–47	6–0	15 – Freeman	11 – Freeman	3 – Sanders	Louis Brown Athletic Center (4,336); Piscataway, NJ
November 28, 2017*; 7:00 pm, ESPNU		Florida State; ACC–Big Ten Challenge	L 73–78	6–1	22 – Omoruyi	16 – Freeman	5 – Sanders	Louis Brown Athletic Center (4,853); Piscataway, NJ
December 3, 2017; 6:00 pm, BTN		at No. 12 Minnesota	L 67–89	6–2 (0–1)	13 – Doucoure	12 – Freeman	5 – Sanders	Williams Arena (11,097); Minneapolis, MN
December 5, 2017; 7:00 pm, BTN		No. 3 Michigan State	L 52-62	6–3 (0–2)	13 – Freeman	9 – Freeman	2 – Tied	Louis Brown Athletic Center (6.020); Piscataway, NJ
December 7, 2017*; 7:00 pm, BTN Plus		NJIT	W 73–64	7–3	18 – Sanders	8 – Sá	4 – Baker	Louis Brown Athletic Center (3,732); Piscataway, NJ
December 9, 2017*; 7:00 pm, BTN Plus		Fairleigh Dickinson	W 92–54	8–3	19 – Tied	9 – Thiam	11 – Baker	Louis Brown Athletic Center (1,869); Piscataway, NJ
December 12, 2017*; 7:00 pm, ESPNU		Fordham	W 75–63	9–3	14 – Freeman	10 – Freeman	5 – Sanders	Louis Brown Athletic Center (3,389); Piscataway, NJ
December 16, 2017*; 12:00 pm, BTN		No. 15 Seton Hall; Rivalry/Garden State Hardwood Classic	W 71–65	10–3	22 – Sanders	16 – Freeman	4 – Baker	Louis Brown Athletic Center (8,318); Piscataway, NJ
December 22, 2017*; 7:00 pm, BTN Plus		Stony Brook	L 73–75	10–4	20 – Freeman	7 – Sanders	6 – Baker	Louis Brown Athletic Center (4,675); Piscataway, NJ
December 29, 2017*; 7:00 pm, BTN Plus		Hartford	L 58–60	10–5	17 – Sanders	7 – 3 tied	3 – Tied	Louis Brown Athletic Center (4,632); Piscataway, NJ
January 3, 2018; 7:00 pm, BTN		at No. 13 Purdue	L 51–82	10–6 (0–3)	11 – Baker	6 – Doorson	3 – Sanders	Mackey Arena (13,449); West Lafayette, IN
January 5, 2018; 7:00 pm, ESPN2		Wisconsin	W 64–60	11–6 (1–3)	23 – Sanders	5 – Omoruyi	2 – 5 tied	Louis Brown Athletic Center (5,709); Piscataway, NJ
January 10, 2018; 7:00 pm, BTN		at No. 4 Michigan State	L 72–76 ^{OT}	11–7 (1–4)	22 – Sanders	7 – Doorson	4 – Sanders	Breslin Center (14,797); East Lansing, MI
January 14, 2018; 7:00 pm, BTN		Ohio State	L 46–68	11–8 (1–5)	14 – Baker	6 – Tied	3 – Sanders	Louis Brown Athletic Center (7,476); Piscataway, NJ
January 17, 2018; 7:00 pm, BTN		Iowa	W 80–64	12–8 (2–5)	18 – Sanders	8 – Freeman	8 – Sanders	Louis Brown Athletic Center (4,002); Piscataway, NJ
January 21, 2018; 12:00 pm, BTN		at No. 23 Michigan	L 47–62	12–9 (2–6)	12 – Sanders	11 – Freeman	1 – Freeman	Crisler Center (11,582); Ann Arbor, MI
January 24, 2018; 7:00 pm, BTN		Nebraska	L 54–60	12–10 (2–7)	14 – Sanders	10 – Freeman	2 – Tied	Louis Brown Athletic Center (4,075); Piscataway, NJ
January 27, 2018; 4:00 pm, BTN		at Penn State	L 43–60	12–11 (2–8)	12 – Thiam	8 – Freeman	4 – Baker	Bryce Jordan Center (13,677); University Park, PA
January 30, 2018; 7:00 pm, BTN		at Illinois	L 60–91	12–12 (2–9)	19 – Baker	5 – Sanders	2 – Sanders	State Farm Center (12,612); Champaign, IL
February 3, 2018; 4:00 pm, BTN		No. 3 Purdue	L 76–78	12–13 (2–10)	31 – Sanders	9 – Freeman	3 – Sanders	Louis Brown Athletic Center (8,325); Piscataway, NJ
February 5, 2018; 7:00 pm, BTN		Indiana	L 43–65	12–14 (2–11)	13 – Freeman	8 – Freeman	2 – Tied	Louis Brown Athletic Center (4,360); Piscataway, NJ
February 10, 2018; 4:00 pm, BTN		at Nebraska	L 55–67	12–15 (2–12)	14 – Sanders	9 – Omoruyi	3 – Baker	Pinnacle Bank Arena (15,867); Lincoln, NE
February 13, 2018; 8:00 pm, BTN		Northwestern	W 67–58 ^{OT}	13–15 (3–12)	30 – Sanders	10 – Omoruyi	4 – Sanders	Louis Brown Athletic Center (3,827); Piscataway, NJ
February 17, 2018; 8:00 pm, BTN		at Maryland	L 51–61	13–16 (3–13)	11 – Omoruyi	10 – Freeman	2 – 2 tied	Xfinity Center (15,587); College Park, MD
February 20, 2018; 7:00 pm, BTN		at No. 16 Ohio State	L 52–79	13–17 (3–14)	12 – Sanders	6 – Thiam	2 – 4 tied	Value City Arena (15,620); Columbus, OH
February 25, 2018; 3:00 pm, BTN		Illinois	L 62–75	13–18 (3–15)	18 – Sanders	6 – Sanders	4 – Sanders	Louis Brown Athletic Center (7,017); Piscataway, NJ
Big Ten tournament
February 28, 2018; 8:00 pm, BTN	(14)	vs. (11) Minnesota; First round	W 65–54	14–18	23 – Sanders	11 – Freeman	2 – Sanders	Madison Square Garden (14,681); New York City, NY
March 1, 2018; 9:00 pm, BTN	(14)	vs. (6) Indiana; Second round	W 76–69	15–18	28 – Sanders	8 – Freeman	3 – Sanders	Madison Square Garden (13,992); New York City, NY
March 2, 2018; 9:00 pm, BTN	(14)	vs. (3) No. 10 Purdue; Quarterfinals	L 75–82	15–19	25 – Baker	8 – Williams	4 – Sanders	Madison Square Garden; New York City, NY
*Non-conference game. ^{#}Rankings from AP Poll. (#) Tournament seedings in parentheses. All times are in Eastern Time.
