= 2017–18 Fairleigh Dickinson Knights men's basketball team =

American college basketball season

2017–18 Fairleigh Dickinson Knights men's basketball
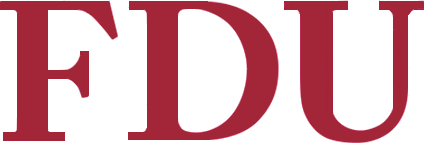
- Conference: Northeast Conference
- Record: 13–18 (9–9 NEC)
- Head coach: Greg Herenda (5th season)
- Assistant coaches: Bruce Hamburger; Patrick Sellers; Pete Lappas
- Home arena: Rothman Center

2017–18 Northeast Conference men's basketball standings
	Conf.				Overall
Team	W		L	PCT	W		L	PCT
Wagner	14	–	4	.778	23	–	10	.697
Saint Francis (PA)	12	–	6	.667	18	–	13	.581
Mount St. Mary's	12	–	6	.667	18	–	14	.563
LIU Brooklyn †	10	–	8	.556	18	–	17	.514
St. Francis Brooklyn	10	–	8	.556	13	–	18	.419
Robert Morris	9	–	9	.500	16	–	17	.485
Fairleigh Dickinson	9	–	9	.500	13	–	18	.419
Central Connecticut	7	–	11	.389	14	–	18	.438
Sacred Heart	5	–	13	.278	10	–	21	.323
Bryant	2	–	16	.111	3	–	28	.097
† 2018 NEC tournament winner

The 2017–18 Fairleigh Dickinson Knights men's basketball team represented Fairleigh Dickinson University during the 2017–18 NCAA Division I men's basketball season. The team was led by fifth-year head coach Greg Herenda. The Knights played their home games at the Rothman Center in Hackensack, New Jersey as members of the Northeast Conference. They finished the season 13–18, 9–9 in NEC play to finish in a tie for sixth place. They defeated Saint Francis (PA) in the quarterfinals of the NEC tournament before losing in the semifinals to LIU Brooklyn.

== Previous season ==
The Knights finished the 2016–17 season 11–19, 9–9 in NEC play to finish in a three-way tie for fifth place. They lost to Wagner in the opening round of the NEC tournament.

== Preseason ==
In a poll of league coaches at the NEC media day, the Knights were picked to finish in second place. Senior guard Darian Anderson was named the preseason All-NEC team.

== Roster ==
2017–18 Fairleigh Dickinson Knights men's basketball team
Players
Coaches

Pos.	#	Name	Height	Weight	Year	Hometown
G	0	Tyler Jones	5 ft 11 in (1.8 m)	165 lb (75 kg)	Fr	Lawrenceville, New Jersey
G	1	Darnell Edge	6 ft 1 in (1.85 m)	185 lb (84 kg)	Jr	Saugerties, New York
G	2	Darian Anderson	6 ft 1 in (1.85 m)	170 lb (77 kg)	Sr	Washington, D.C.
G	3	Jahlil Jenkins	5 ft 10 in (1.78 m)	160 lb (73 kg)	Fr	Shenandoah Junction, West Virginia
F	5	Noah Morgan	6 ft 5 in (1.96 m)	190 lb (86 kg)	Fr	Mount Vernon, New York
G	10	Pat McNamara	6 ft 5 in (1.96 m)	190 lb (86 kg)	So	Arlington Heights, Illinois
F	12	Kaleb Bishop	6 ft 8 in (2.03 m)	195 lb (88 kg)	So	Paterson, New Jersey
G	13	Mike Schroback	5 ft 10 in (1.78 m)	175 lb (79 kg)	Sr	Hasbrouck Heights, New Jersey
F	14	Elyjah Williams	6 ft 7 in (2.01 m)	220 lb (100 kg)	Fr	Evanston, Illinois
F	20	Dondre Rhoden	6 ft 6 in (1.98 m)	230 lb (104 kg)	Jr	Ridgefield Park, New Jersey
G	22	Brian Fabre	5 ft 10 in (1.78 m)	160 lb (73 kg)	Jr	Bronx, New York
G	23	Xzavier Malone	6 ft 4 in (1.93 m)	172 lb (78 kg)	RS So	Philadelphia, Pennsylvania
F	24	Nadi Beciri	6 ft 7 in (2.01 m)	235 lb (107 kg)	Jr	Maywood, New Jersey
F	34	Mike Holloway Jr.	6 ft 7 in (2.01 m)	250 lb (113 kg)	Jr	Pittsgrove, New Jersey
C	35	Malik Miller	6 ft 9 in (2.06 m)	215 lb (98 kg)	Jr	Troy, New York

Head coach

- Greg Herenda (Merrimack)

Assistant coach(es)

- Bruce Hamburger (Central Connecticut State)
- Patrick Sellers (Central Connecticut)
- Pete Lappas (Boston College)

Legend

- (C) Team captain
- (S) Suspended
- (I) Ineligible
- (W) Walk-on
- Injured
- Current redshirt

Roster

== Schedule and results ==
Date time, TV	Rank^{#}	Opponent^{#}	Result	Record	Site (attendance) city, state
Exhibition
Nov 2, 2017*; 7:00 pm		Manhattanville	W 71–56		Rothman Center; Hackensack, NJ
Non-conference regular season
Nov 10, 2017*; 6:30 pm, FS2		at No. 23 Seton Hall; NIT Season Tip-Off	L 68–90	0–1	Prudential Center (6,733); Newark, NJ
Nov 12, 2017*; 5:00 pm, BTN Plus		at Penn State	L 57–81	0–2	Bryce Jordan Center (5,802); University Park, PA
Nov 15, 2017*; 7:00 pm		FDU–Florham	W 111–49	1–2	Rothman Center (367); Hackensack, NJ
Nov 18, 2017*; 2:00 pm		Kean	W 94–55	2–2	Rothman Center (298); Hackensack, NJ
Nov 22, 2017*; 2:00 pm		Holy Cross	W 87–76	3–2	Rothman Center (402); Hackensack, NJ
Nov 26, 2017*; 2:00 pm		Princeton	L 76–83	3–3	Rothman Center (642); Hackensack, NJ
Nov 29, 2017*; 7:00 pm		at Saint Peter's	L 53–77	3–4	Yanitelli Center (855); Jersey City, NJ
Dec 2, 2017*; 1:00 pm, ESPN3		at Iona	L 75–82	3–5	Hynes Athletic Center (1,500); New Rochelle, NY
Dec 9, 2017*; 7:00 pm, BTN Plus		at Rutgers	L 54–92	3–6	Louis Brown Athletic Center (1,869); Piscataway, NJ
Dec 16, 2017*; 4:00 pm, ESPN3		at NJIT	L 68–71	3–7	Wellness and Events Center (435); Newark, NJ
Dec 21, 2017*; 7:00 pm, ESPNU		at Maryland	L 50–75	3–8	Xfinity Center (12,133); College Park, MD
NEC regular season
Dec 29, 2017; 4:30 pm		at LIU Brooklyn	W 82–71	4–8 (1–0)	Steinberg Wellness Center (697); Brooklyn, NY
Dec 31, 2017; 2:30 pm		at Sacred Heart	L 65–66	4–9 (1–1)	William H. Pitt Center; Fairfield, CT
Jan 4, 2018; 7:00 pm		Central Connecticut	W 81–77	5–9 (2–1)	Rothman Center (117); Hackensack, NJ
Jan 6, 2018; 4:00 pm		at Wagner	L 65–73	5–10 (2–2)	Spiro Sports Center (817); Staten Island, NY
Jan 11, 2018; 7:00 pm		LIU Brooklyn	L 85–90	5–11 (2–3)	Rothman Center (342); Hackensack, NJ
Jan 13, 2018; 4:30 pm		Robert Morris	L 75–81	5–12 (2–4)	Rothman Center (578); Hackensack, NJ
Jan 18, 2018; 7:00 pm		at Central Connecticut	L 65–66	5–13 (2–5)	William H. Detrick Gymnasium (1,679); New Britain, CT
Jan 20, 2018; 4:30 pm		Mount St. Mary's	W 73–72	6–13 (3–5)	Rothman Center (486); Hackensack, NJ
Jan 25, 2018; 7:00 pm		St. Francis Brooklyn	L 70–76	6–14 (3–6)	Rothman Center (297); Hackensack, NJ
Jan 27, 2018; 1:00 pm		at Bryant	W 89–78	7–14 (4–6)	Chace Athletic Center (862); Smithfield, RI
Feb 1, 2018; 6:00 pm, CBSSN		at Saint Francis (PA)	L 60–74	7–15 (4–7)	DeGol Arena (742); Loretto, PA
Feb 3, 2018; 2:00 pm		at Robert Morris	W 73–67	8–15 (5–7)	PPG Paints Arena (971); Pittsburgh, PA
Feb 8, 2018; 7:00 pm		Sacred Heart	W 77–67	9–15 (6–7)	Rothman Center (392); Hackensack, NJ
Feb 11, 2018; 2:00 pm, CBSSN		Wagner	W 76–69	10–15 (7–7)	Rothman Center (1,731); Hackensack, NJ
Feb 15, 2018; 7:00 pm		at Mount St. Mary's	W 80–79	11–15 (8–7)	Knott Arena (2,322); Emmitsburg, MD
Feb 17, 2018; 4:00 pm, ESPN3		at St. Francis Brooklyn	L 74–87	11–16 (8–8)	Generoso Pope Athletic Complex (636); Brooklyn, NY
Feb 22, 2018; 7:00 pm		Saint Francis (PA)	L 82–90	11–17 (8–9)	Rothman Center (416); Hackensack, NJ
Feb 24, 2018; 4:30 pm		Bryant	W 87–83	12–17 (9–9)	Rothman Center (623); Hackensack, NJ
NEC tournament
Feb 28, 2018; 7:00 pm	(6)	at (3) Saint Francis (PA); Quarterfinals	W 84–75	13–17	DeGol Arena (1,051); Loretto, PA
Mar 3, 2018; 12:00 pm, ESPN3	(6)	at (4) LIU Brooklyn; Semifinals	L 77–78	13–18	Steinberg Wellness Center (1,212); Brooklyn, NY
*Non-conference game. ^{#}Rankings from AP Poll. (#) Tournament seedings in parentheses. All times are in Eastern Time Source.
