= 2017–18 Robert Morris Colonials men's basketball team =

American college basketball season

2017–18 Robert Morris Colonials men's basketball
- Conference: Northeast Conference
- Record: 16–17 (9–9 NEC)
- Head coach: Andrew Toole (8th season)
- Assistant coaches: Kyle Griffin; Mike Iuzzolino; Dante' Jackson
- Home arena: PPG Paints Arena; AJ Palumbo Center (four games)

2017–18 Northeast Conference men's basketball standings
	Conf.				Overall
Team	W		L	PCT	W		L	PCT
Wagner	14	–	4	.778	23	–	10	.697
Saint Francis (PA)	12	–	6	.667	18	–	13	.581
Mount St. Mary's	12	–	6	.667	18	–	14	.563
LIU Brooklyn †	10	–	8	.556	18	–	17	.514
St. Francis Brooklyn	10	–	8	.556	13	–	18	.419
Robert Morris	9	–	9	.500	16	–	17	.485
Fairleigh Dickinson	9	–	9	.500	13	–	18	.419
Central Connecticut	7	–	11	.389	14	–	18	.438
Sacred Heart	5	–	13	.278	10	–	21	.323
Bryant	2	–	16	.111	3	–	28	.097
† 2018 NEC tournament winner

The 2017–18 Robert Morris Colonials men's basketball team represented Robert Morris University during the 2017–18 NCAA Division I men's basketball season. The Colonials, led by eighth-year head coach Andrew Toole, played their home games at the PPG Paints Arena and four games at the Palumbo Center in Pittsburgh, Pennsylvania as members of the Northeast Conference. They finished the season 16–17, 9–9 in NEC play to finish in a tie for sixth place. As the No. 7 seed in the NEC tournament, they upset No. 2 seed Mount St. Mary's in the quarterfinals before losing in the semifinals to No. 1 seed Wagner.

On January 30, 2017, Robert Morris announced plans to build a new basketball and volleyball facility named the UPMC Events Center on the school's campus. The basketball team's former home, the Charles L. Sewall Center was to be demolished to make room for the new arena. As a result, the Colonials played their home games at the PPG Paints Arena and at the Palumbo Center on the campus of Duquesne University.

== Previous season ==
The Colonials finished the 2016–17 season 14–19, 9–9 in NEC play to finish in a three-way tie for fifth place. As the No. 7 seed in the NEC tournament, they defeated LIU Brooklyn in the quarterfinals before losing in the semifinals to Mount St. Mary's.

== Preseason ==
In a poll of league coaches at the NEC media day, the Colonials were picked to finish in seventh place.

== Roster ==
2017–18 Robert Morris Colonials men's basketball team
Players
Coaches

Pos.	#	Name	Height	Weight	Year	Hometown
F	25	Xavier Williams	6 ft 9 in (2.06 m)	225 lb (102 kg)	GS	Fairfield, Alabama
F	22	Ronnie Gombe	6 ft 8 in (2.03 m)	240 lb (109 kg)	GS	Nairobi, Kenya
G	0	Josh Williams	6 ft 2 in (1.88 m)	195 lb (88 kg)	Jr	Akron, Ohio
G	4	Taevon Ashmeade	6 ft 4 in (1.93 m)	185 lb (84 kg)	Jr	Bronx, New York
F	5	Malik Petteway	6 ft 8 in (2.03 m)	240 lb (109 kg)	Jr	Waterbury, Connecticut
F	13	Seth Rouse	6 ft 3 in (1.91 m)	205 lb (93 kg)	Jr	Pittsburgh, Pennsylvania
G	23	Matty McConnell	6 ft 2 in (1.88 m)	195 lb (88 kg)	Jr	Oakdale, Pennsylvania
G	11	Dachon Burke	6 ft 4 in (1.93 m)	180 lb (82 kg)	So	Orange, New Jersey
F	2	David Cole	6 ft 7 in (2.01 m)	240 lb (109 kg)	RS Fr	Corona, New York
G	1	Jon Williams	6 ft 0 in (1.83 m)	175 lb (79 kg)	Fr	Akron, Ohio
G	3	Leondre Washington	6 ft 0 in (1.83 m)	175 lb (79 kg)	Fr	Englewood, New Jersey
F	10	Koby Thomas	6 ft 6 in (1.98 m)	190 lb (86 kg)	Fr	Philadelphia, Pennsylvania
F	20	Charles Bain	6 ft 8 in (2.03 m)	200 lb (91 kg)	Fr	Freeport, Bahamas
F	24	Chris Coalmon	6 ft 6 in (1.98 m)	185 lb (84 kg)	Fr	North Babylon, New York

Head coach

- Andrew Toole (Pennsylvania)

Assistant coach(es)

- Kyle Griffin (Siena)
- Mike Iuzzolino (Saint Francis (PA))
- Dante' Jackson (Xavier)

Legend

- (C) Team captain
- (S) Suspended
- (I) Ineligible
- (W) Walk-on
- Injured
- Current redshirt

Roster

== Schedule and results ==
Date time, TV	Rank^{#}	Opponent^{#}	Result	Record	Site (attendance) city, state
Exhibition
October 27, 2017*; 7:00		at Niagara; Hurricane relief exhibition game	W 73–70	–	Gallagher Center (605); Lewiston, NY
October 30, 2017*; 7:00 pm		at St. Vincent	W 78–61	–	Robert S. Carey Center (950); Latrobe, PA
Non-conference regular season
November 10, 2017*; 7:00 pm, BTN Plus		at Ohio State	L 64–95	0–1	Value City Arena (11,128); Columbus, OH
November 13, 2017*; 10:00 pm		at Grand Canyon; Grand Canyon Classic	L 61–75	0–2	GCU Arena (6,833); Phoenix, AZ
November 15, 2017*; 10:00 pm		at San Diego; Grand Canyon Classic	L 53–65	0–3	Jenny Craig Pavilion (1,131); San Diego, CA
November 19, 2017*; 5:30pm		at Duquesne	W 66–59	1–3	Palumbo Center (1,481); Pittsburgh, PA
November 24, 2017*; 6:00 pm		vs. Norfolk State; Grand Canyon Classic	W 75–53	2–3	Jack Stephens Center (218); Little Rock, AR
November 25, 2017*; 4:00 pm		at Little Rock; Grand Canyon Classic	W 78–64	3–3	Jack Stephens Center (1,403); Little Rock, AR
November 29, 2017*; 7:00 pm		at Youngstown State	W 81–74	4–3	Beeghly Center (1,786); Youngstown, OH
December 2, 2017*; 2:00 pm		at Siena	L 74–76	4–4	Times Union Center (5,749); Albany, NY
December 6, 2017*; 7:00 pm		Rider	W 78–75	5–4	PPG Paints Arena (864); Pittsburgh, PA
December 10, 2017*; 2:00 pm		Drexel	W 70–64	6–4	PPG Paints Arena (621); Pittsburgh, PA
December 16, 2017*; 2:00 pm, ESPN3		at Buffalo	L 70–86	6–5	Alumni Arena (2,158); Amherst, NY
December 19, 2017*; 7:00 pm, ACCN Extra		at NC State	L 69–81	6–6	PNC Arena (13,695); Raleigh, NC
December 22, 2017*; 7:00 pm		Canisius	L 62–76	6–7	Palumbo Center (843); Pittsburgh, PA
NEC regular season
December 29, 2017; 3:00 pm		at Bryant	W 68–54	7–7 (1–0)	Chace Athletic Center (305); Smithfield, RI
December 31, 2017; 3:30pm		at Central Connecticut	W 71–57	8–7 (2–0)	William H. Detrick Gymnasium (1,214); New Britain, CT
January 4, 2018; 7:00pm		St. Francis Brooklyn	W 80–79 ^{OT}	9–7 (3–0)	Palumbo Center (855); Pittsburgh, PA
January 6, 2018; 4:00 pm		LIU Brooklyn	W 88–79	10–7 (4–0)	PPG Paints Arena (598); Pittsburgh, PA
January 11, 2018; 7:00 pm, ESPN3		Saint Francis (PA)	L 80–89	10–8 (4–1)	PPG Paints Arena (718); Pittsburgh, PA
January 13, 2018; 4:30 pm		at Fairleigh Dickinson	W 81–75	11–8 (5–1)	Rothman Center (578); Hackensack, NJ
January 18, 2018; 6:00 pm		at Sacred Heart	W 74–60	12–8 (6–1)	William H. Pitt Center (324); Fairfield, CT
January 20, 2018; 4:00 pm		at Wagner	L 49–62	12–9 (6–2)	Spiro Sports Center (1,784); Staten Island, NY
January 26, 2018; 7:00 pm		Sacred Heart	W 64–56	13–9 (7–2)	PPG Paints Arena (636); Pittsburgh, PA
January 28, 2018; 2:00 pm		Wagner	L 64–77	13–10 (7–3)	PPG Paints Arena (1,029); Pittsburgh, PA
February 1, 2018; 7:00 pm		Mount St. Mary's	L 42–67	13–11 (7–4)	PPG Paints Arena (804); Pittsburgh, PA
February 3, 2018; 2:00 pm		Fairleigh Dickinson	L 67–73	13–12 (7–5)	PPG Paints Arena (971); Pittsburgh, PA
February 8, 2018; 7:00 pm		at St. Francis Brooklyn	L 65–77	13–13 (7–6)	Generoso Pope Athletic Complex (617); Brooklyn, NY
February 10, 2018; 4:30 pm		at LIU Brooklyn	W 96–82	14–13 (8–6)	Steinberg Wellness Center (874); Brooklyn, NY
February 15, 2018; 7:00 pm		Bryant	W 83–60	15–13 (9–6)	Palumbo Center (583); Pittsburgh, PA
February 17, 2018; 7:00 pm		Central Connecticut	L 58–65	15–14 (9–7)	Palumbo Center (668); Pittsburgh, PA
February 22, 2018; 7:00 pm, CBSSN		at Mount St. Mary's	L 53–72	15–15 (9–8)	Knott Arena (2,908); Emmitsburg, MD
February 24, 2018; 2:00 pm		at Saint Francis (PA)	L 60–80	15–16 (9–9)	DeGol Arena; Loretto, PA
NEC tournament
February 28, 2018; 7:00 pm	(7)	at (2) Mount St. Mary's; Quarterfinals	W 60–56	16–16	Knott Arena (2,129); Emmitsburg, MD
March 3, 2018; 2:00 pm, ESPN3	(7)	at (1) Wagner; Semifinals	L 64–75	16–17	Spiro Sports Center (1,863); Staten Island, NY
*Non-conference game. ^{#}Rankings from AP Poll. (#) Tournament seedings in parentheses. All times are in Eastern Time.
