= 2017–18 Mount St. Mary's Mountaineers men's basketball team =

American college basketball season

2017–18 Mount St. Mary's Mountaineers men's basketball
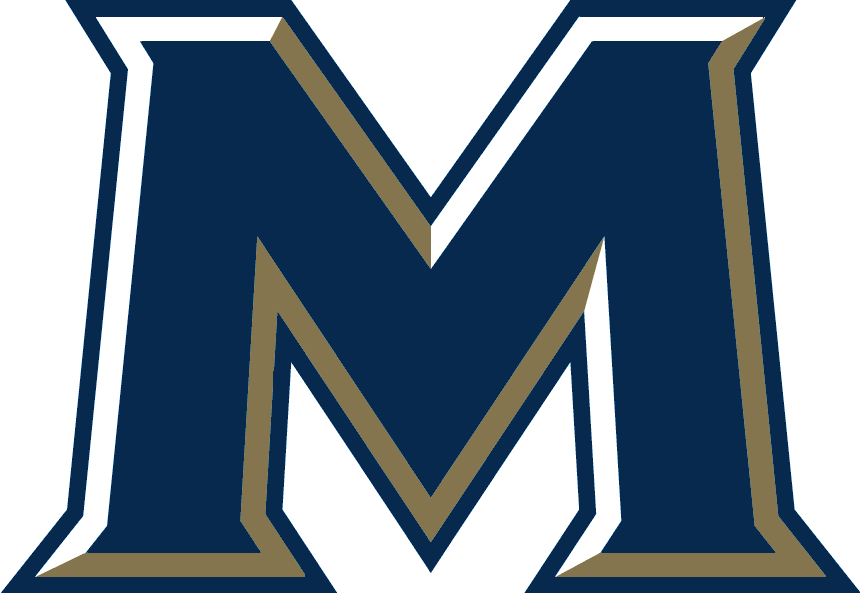
- Conference: Northeast Conference
- Record: 18–14 (12–6 NEC)
- Head coach: Jamion Christian (6th season)
- Assistant coaches: Will Holland; Graham Bousley; Julian Boatner
- Home arena: Knott Arena

2017–18 Northeast Conference men's basketball standings
	Conf.				Overall
Team	W		L	PCT	W		L	PCT
Wagner	14	–	4	.778	23	–	10	.697
Saint Francis (PA)	12	–	6	.667	18	–	13	.581
Mount St. Mary's	12	–	6	.667	18	–	14	.563
LIU Brooklyn †	10	–	8	.556	18	–	17	.514
St. Francis Brooklyn	10	–	8	.556	13	–	18	.419
Robert Morris	9	–	9	.500	16	–	17	.485
Fairleigh Dickinson	9	–	9	.500	13	–	18	.419
Central Connecticut	7	–	11	.389	14	–	18	.438
Sacred Heart	5	–	13	.278	10	–	21	.323
Bryant	2	–	16	.111	3	–	28	.097
† 2018 NEC tournament winner

The 2017–18 Mount St. Mary's Mountaineers men's basketball team represented Mount St. Mary's University during the 2017–18 NCAA Division I men's basketball season. The Mountaineers, led by sixth-year head coach Jamion Christian, played their home games at Knott Arena in Emmitsburg, Maryland as members of the Northeast Conference (NEC). They finished the season 18–14, 12–6 in NEC play, to finish in a tie for second place. As the No. 2 seed in the NEC tournament, they were upset in the quarterfinals by Robert Morris.

On May 2, 2018, Jamion Christian left his alma mater to take the head coaching job at Siena. One week later, the school hired former Mountaineer assistant coach Dan Engelstad from Division III Southern Vermont.

== Previous season ==
The Mountaineers finished the 2016–17 season 20–16, 14–4 in NEC play, to win the regular-season NEC championship. The Mountaineers defeated Sacred Heart, Robert Morris and Saint Francis (PA) to win the NEC tournament championship. As a result, the received the conference's automatic bid to the NCAA tournament. As a No. 16 seed in the East region, the defeated New Orleans in the First Four before losing to #1 Villanova in the first round.

== Preseason ==
In a poll of league coaches at the NEC media day, the Mountaineers were picked to finish in fourth place. Senior guard Junior Robinson was named the preseason All-NEC team.

== Roster ==
2017–18 Mount St. Mary's Mountaineers men's basketball team
Players
Coaches

Pos.	#	Name	Height	Weight	Year	Hometown
G	0	Junior Robinson	5 ft 5 in (1.65 m)	165 lb (75 kg)	Sr	Mebane, NC
F	5	Chris Wray	6 ft 8 in (2.03 m)	190 lb (86 kg)	Sr	Shelby, NC
G	23	Greg Alexander	6 ft 4 in (1.93 m)	210 lb (95 kg)	Sr	Hampton, VA
C	54	Ryan Gomes	6 ft 10 in (2.08 m)	220 lb (100 kg)	So	Westminster, MD
G	15	Brandon Leftwich	6 ft 2 in (1.88 m)	177 lb (80 kg)	So	Brooklyn, NY
F	30	Jack Vukelich	6 ft 9 in (2.06 m)	185 lb (84 kg)	RS Fr	Mechanicsburg, PA
G	3	Jonah Antonio	6 ft 5 in (1.96 m)	175 lb (79 kg)	RS Fr	Perth, Australia
G	10	Donald Carey	6 ft 5 in (1.96 m)	185 lb (84 kg)	Fr	Upper Marlboro, MD
G	12	Odri Dedolli	6 ft 3 in (1.91 m)	177 lb (80 kg)	Fr	Tirana, Albania
F	13	Omar Habwe	6 ft 6 in (1.98 m)	225 lb (102 kg)	Fr	Lexington, VA
F	22	Nana Opoku	6 ft 8 in (2.03 m)	186 lb (84 kg)	Fr	Woodbridge, VA
F	1	Bobby Planutis	6 ft 8 in (2.03 m)	190 lb (86 kg)	Fr	Hazleton, PA
F	11	Ace Stallings	6 ft 10 in (2.08 m)	230 lb (104 kg)	Fr	Miami, FL
G	4	James IV West	6 ft 1 in (1.85 m)	165 lb (75 kg)	Fr	Woodbridge, VA
F	14	Ross Young	6 ft 7 in (2.01 m)	196 lb (89 kg)	Fr	Atlanta, GA

Head coach

- Jamion Christian

Assistant coach(es)

- Will Holland
- Graham Bousley
- Julian Boatner

Legend

- (C) Team captain
- (S) Suspended
- (I) Ineligible
- (W) Walk-on
- Injured
- Current redshirt

Roster
Last update: July 21, 2024

== Schedule and results ==
Date time, TV	Rank^{#}	Opponent^{#}	Result	Record	High points	High rebounds	High assists	Site (attendance) city, state
Exhibition
November 1, 2017*; 9:40 p.m.		Delaware; Hurricane relief charity exhibition	W 84–82 ^{OT}		27 – Robinson	8 – Planutis	8 – Robinson	Knott Arena (1,048); Emmitsburg, MD
November 4, 2017*; 4:00 p.m.		Hood	W 93–78		38 – Robinson	7 – Carey	6 – Carey	Knott Arena (1,120); Emmitsburg, MD
Non-conference regular season
November 10, 2017*; 9:00 p.m., FS Wisconsin/MASN2		at Marquette; Maui Invitational	L 59–80	0–1	20 – Robinson	5 – Antonio	6 – Robinson	BMO Harris Bradley Center (13,324); Milwaukee, WI
November 13, 2017*; 7:00 p.m., ACCNX		at No. 13 Notre Dame; Maui Invitational	L 62–88	0–2	14 – Robinson	7 – Planutis	3 – Carey	Edmund P. Joyce Center (6,633); South Bend, IN
November 15, 2017*; 7:00 p.m., FS2		at Georgetown	L 68–102	0–3	26 – Robinson	5 – Antonio	6 – Carey	Capital One Arena (5,064); Washington, D.C.
November 18, 2017*; 4:00 p.m.		vs. North Florida; Maui Invitational	W 84–81	1–3	20 – Robinson	7 – Planutis	7 – Carey	Jerry Richardson Indoor Stadium (300); Spartanburg, SC
November 21, 2017*; 7:00 p.m.		York (PA)	W 91–80	2–3	27 – Robinson	10 – Antonio	12 – Carey	Knott Arena (1,290); Emmitsburg, MD
November 24, 2017*; 7:00 p.m.		at Ohio	L 77–96	2–4	21 – Robinson	7 – Antonio	10 – Robinson	Convocation Center (4,099); Athens, OH
November 27, 2017*; 7:00 p.m.		Morgan State	L 63–69	2–5	13 – tied	8 – Carey	8 – Robinson	Knott Arena (1,420); Emmitsburg, MD
December 2, 2017*; 4:00 p.m., MASN		Loyola (MD)	W 80–75 ^{OT}	3–5	39 – Robinson	6 – Antonio	5 – Carey	Knott Arena (2,480); Emmitsburg, MD
December 5, 2017*; 7:00 p.m., ACCN Extra		at Pittsburgh	L 78–82 ^{OT}	3–6	24 – Robinson	7 – Carey	9 – Robinson	Petersen Events Center (2,333); Pittsburgh, PA
December 9, 2017*; 2:00 p.m.		at Lehigh	L 60–75	3–7	20 – Robinson	7 – Wray	4 – tied	Stabler Arena (694); Bethlehem, PA
December 15, 2017*; 7:30 p.m.		Washington College	W 89–67	4–7	30 – Robinson	8 – Wray	5 – Robinson	Knott Arena (1,225); Emmitsburg, MD
December 18, 2017*; 7:00 p.m.		at American	W 59–56	5–7	13 – Robinson	12 – Wray	5 – Robinson	Bender Arena (283); Washington, D.C.
December 22, 2017*; 7:00 p.m.		at Coppin State	W 66–53	6–7	23 – Robinson	11 – Wray	8 – Robinson	Physical Education Complex (725); Baltimore, MD
NEC regular season
December 29, 2017; 7:00 p.m.		at Wagner	L 57–76	6–8 (0–1)	19 – Robinson	5 – Wray	3 – tied	Spiro Sports Center (1,722); Staten Island, NY
December 31, 2017; 2:00 p.m.		at LIU Brooklyn	L 57–71	6–9 (0–2)	12 – tied	8 – Wray	4 – Wray	Steinberg Wellness Center (597); Brooklyn, NY
January 4, 2018; 7:00 p.m.		Bryant	W 96–80	7–9 (1–2)	25 – Robinson	10 – Wray	9 – Robinson	Knott Arena (1,348); Emmitsburg, MD
January 6, 2018; 4:00 p.m.		Central Connecticut	W 78–51	8–9 (2–2)	27 – Robinson	9 – Wray	7 – Carey	Knott Arena (2,384); Emmitsburg, MD
January 11, 2018; 7:00 p.m.		Sacred Heart	W 81–75	9–9 (3–2)	23 – Robinson	7 – Wray	4 – tied	Knott Arena (1,448); Emmitsburg, MD
January 13, 2018; 2:00 p.m.		at Saint Francis (PA)	W 81–80 ^{OT}	10–9 (4–2)	22 – Wray	8 – Wray	10 – Robinson	DeGol Arena (954); Loretto, PA
January 18, 2018; 7:00 p.m.		at St. Francis Brooklyn	L 73–81	10–10 (4–3)	21 – Robinson	8 – Wray	6 – Carey	Generoso Pope Athletic Complex (385); Brooklyn, NY
January 20, 2018; 4:30 p.m.		at Fairleigh Dickinson	L 72–73	10–11 (4–4)	19 – Robinson	13 – Wray	7 – Robinson	Rothman Center (486); Hackensack, NJ
January 25, 2018; 9:00 p.m., CBSSN		LIU Brooklyn	W 86–80	11–11 (5–4)	24 – Robinson	9 – Wray	7 – Wray	Knott Arena (2,231); Emmitsburg, MD
January 27, 2018; 4:00 p.m.		St. Francis Brooklyn	W 86–72	12–11 (6–4)	27 – Robinson	8 – Antonio	7 – Wray	Knott Arena (3,005); Emmitsburg, MD
February 1, 2018; 7:00 p.m.		at Robert Morris	W 67–42	13–11 (7–4)	15 – Alexander	13 – Wray	6 – Wray	PPG Paints Arena (804); Pittsburgh, PA
February 3, 2018; 4:00 p.m.		Saint Francis (PA)	W 59–56	14–11 (8–4)	20 – Robinson	7 – Wray	3 – tied	Knott Arena (3,045); Emmitsburg, MD
February 8, 2018; 7:00 p.m.		at Central Connecticut	W 71–57	15–11 (9–4)	32 – Robinson	8 – Wray	5 – Robinson	William H. Detrick Gymnasium; New Britain, CT
February 10, 2018; 1:00 p.m.		at Bryant	L 77–79	15–12 (9–5)	30 – Robinson	7 – Wray	5 – Wray	Chace Athletic Center (560); Smithfield, RI
February 15, 2018; 7:00 p.m.		Fairleigh Dickinson	L 79–80	15–13 (9–6)	23 – Robinson	8 – Planutis	8 – Wray	Knott Arena (2,322); Emmitsburg, MD
February 17, 2018; 1:00 p.m.		at Sacred Heart	W 74–69	16–13 (10–6)	30 – Robinson	13 – Wray	7 – Wray	William H. Pitt Center (404); Fairfield, CT
February 22, 2018; 7:00 p.m., CBSSN		Robert Morris	W 72–53	17–13 (11–6)	16 – Wray	7 – Planutis	8 – Robinson	Knott Arena (2,908); Emmitsburg, MD
February 24, 2018; 4:00 p.m.		Wagner	W 73–62	18–13 (12–6)	22 – Robinson	9 – Wray	5 – Wray	Knott Arena (3,072); Emmitsburg, MD
NEC tournament
February 28, 2018; 7:00 p.m.	(2)	(7) Robert Morris; Quarterfinals	L 56–60	18–14	15 – Robinson	7 – Planutis	5 – Wray	Knott Arena (2,129); Emmitsburg, MD
*Non-conference game. ^{#}Rankings from AP poll. (#) Tournament seedings in parentheses. E=East Region. All times are in Eastern.
