= Raiquan Clark =

American basketball player (born 1995)

ART Giants Düsseldorf
- Position: Shooting guard / small forward
- League: ProA

Personal information
- Born: August 19, 1995 (age 31) New Haven, Connecticut, U.S.
- Listed height: 6 ft 6 in (1.98 m)
- Listed weight: 195 lb (88 kg)

Career information
- High school: Hillhouse (New Haven, Connecticut); Trinity-Pawling School (Pawling, New York)
- College: LIU Brooklyn (2015–2019); LIU (2019–2020)
- NBA draft: 2020: undrafted
- Playing career: 2021–present

Career history
- 2021–22: Panthers Schwenningen
- 2022–23: Albacete Basket
- 2023: B.B.C. Etzella
- 2023-present: SG ART Giants Düsseldorf

Career highlights
- 2× First-team All-NEC (2019, 2020); Third-team All-NEC (2018)

Raiquan Clark (born August 19, 1995) is an American basketball player for SG ART Giants Düsseldorf of the ProA. He played college basketball for the LIU Sharks and the LIU Brooklyn Blackbirds, leaving as the program's all-time leading scorer.

== High school career ==
Clark attended Hillhouse High School in New Haven, Connecticut. In his junior season, he won the Class LL state championship. As a senior, he averaged 15.2 points, 7.5 rebounds, three assists and three steals per game. He also led Hillhouse to a Southern Connecticut Conference Hammonasset Division title and was a two-time New Haven Register All-Area selection. Clark did not receive any NCAA Division I scholarship offers after his senior season and attended Trinity-Pawling School in Pawling, New York for a postgraduate year to gain more interest. He helped his team achieve a 17–6 record and a New England Preparatory School Athletic Council quarterfinals berth. Clark did not hold any Division I offers by the end of the season. He sent emails, including his highlights and statistics, to over 1,000 coaches representing every Division I program but failed to draw an offer.

== College career ==
As a freshman, Clark played for LIU Brooklyn as a preferred walk-on but vowed to his mother, Shontay Watts, that he would eventually earn a scholarship. In his only appearance, he played two minutes in a loss to Dartmouth. As a sophomore, he was awarded a full scholarship and averaged 6.2 points and 4.2 rebounds per game. On November 10, 2017, Clark scored a career-high 34 points in a 102–96 loss to Tulane. In his junior season, he averaged 17.3 points and seven rebounds per game, earning Third Team All-Northeast Conference (NEC) honors. He led LIU Brooklyn to the 2018 NEC tournament championship, scoring 20 points in a 71–61 victory over top-seeded Wagner, and an appearance in the NCAA Tournament. As a senior, Clark averaged an NEC-high 18.9 points, 6.7 rebounds and two assists per game and was named to the First Tetam All-NEC. On February 8, 2020, he passed Jamal Olasewere to become the all-time leading scorer for LIU and LIU Brooklyn. In his redshirt senior season at LIU, Clark averaged 19.5 points and 7.3 rebounds per game, leading the NEC in scoring and making the First Team All-NEC for a second straight year. He became the seventh player in NEC history to record at least 2,000 career points.

== Professional career ==
In June 2021, Clark signed his first professional contract with Panthers Schwenningen of the German ProA.
