= 2018 Northeast Conference men's basketball tournament =

- Classification: Division I
- Season: 2017–18
- Teams: 8
- Site: Campus sites
- Champions: LIU Brooklyn (6th title)
- Winning coach: Derek Kellogg (1st title)
- MVP: Joel Hernandez (LIU Brooklyn)
- Television: NEC Front Row, ESPN3, ESPN2

2017–18 Northeast Conference men's basketball standings
	Conf.				Overall
Team	W		L	PCT	W		L	PCT
Wagner	14	–	4	.778	23	–	10	.697
Saint Francis (PA)	12	–	6	.667	18	–	13	.581
Mount St. Mary's	12	–	6	.667	18	–	14	.563
LIU Brooklyn †	10	–	8	.556	18	–	17	.514
St. Francis Brooklyn	10	–	8	.556	13	–	18	.419
Robert Morris	9	–	9	.500	16	–	17	.485
Fairleigh Dickinson	9	–	9	.500	13	–	18	.419
Central Connecticut	7	–	11	.389	14	–	18	.438
Sacred Heart	5	–	13	.278	10	–	21	.323
Bryant	2	–	16	.111	3	–	28	.097
† 2018 NEC tournament winner

The 2018 Northeast Conference men's basketball tournament was the postseason men's basketball tournament for the Northeast Conference for the 2017–18 NCAA Division I men's basketball season. All tournament games were played at the home arena of the highest seed, on February 28, March 3, and March 6, 2018. The No. 4 seed LIU Brooklyn defeated No. 1 seed Wagner in the championship game to earn the NEC's automatic bid to the NCAA tournament.

== Seeds ==
The top eight teams in the Northeast Conference were eligible to compete in the conference tournament. Teams were seeded by record within the conference, with a tiebreaker system to seed teams with identical conference records.

On February 17, 2018, Wagner defeated LIU Brooklyn to win the NEC regular season championship outright, their second regular season championship in the previous three years, and received the No. 1 seed.

Seed	School	Conference	Tiebreaker
1	Wagner	14–4	
2	Mount St. Mary's	12–6	2–0 vs SFPA
3	Saint Francis (PA)	12–6	0–2 vs MSM
4	LIU Brooklyn	10–8	1–1 vs SFB, 1–1 vs Wag, 2–2 vs MSM/SFPA
5	St. Francis Brooklyn	10–8	1–1 vs LIU, 1–1 vs Wag, 1–3 vs MSM/SFPA
6	Fairleigh Dickinson	9–9	1–1 vs RMU, 1–1 vs Wag
7	Robert Morris	9–9	1–1 vs FDU, 0–2 vs Wag
8	Central Connecticut	7–11	
DNQ	Sacred Heart	5–13	
DNQ	Bryant	2–16	

== Schedule and results ==
Game	Time	Matchup	Score	Television
Quarterfinals – Wednesday, February 28
1	7:00pm	No. 1 Wagner vs No. 8 Central Connecticut	73–61	NEC Front Row
2	7:00pm	No. 4 LIU Brooklyn vs. No. 5 St. Francis Brooklyn	73–50	NEC Front Row
3	7:00pm	No. 2 Mount Saint Mary's vs No. 7 Robert Morris	56–60	NEC Front Row
4	7:00pm	No. 3 Saint Francis (PA) vs No. 6 Fairleigh Dickinson	75–84	NEC Front Row
Semifinals – Saturday, March 3
5	12:00 pm	No. 4 LIU Brooklyn vs No. 6 Fairleigh Dickinson	78–77	ESPN3/NEC Front Row
6	2:00 pm	No. 1 Wagner vs No. 7 Robert Morris	75–64	ESPN3/NEC Front Row
Final – Tuesday, March 6
7	7:00 pm	No. 1 Wagner vs No. 4 LIU Brooklyn	61–71	ESPN2
Game times in EST. Rankings denote tournament seed

Note: Bracket is re-seeded after quarterfinal matchups, with highest remaining seed playing the lowest remaining seed in the semifinals.

== Bracket and results ==
Teams are reseeded after each round with highest remaining seeds receiving home court advantage.

Quarterfinals; Wednesday, February 28, 2018; NEC Front Row
1	Wagner	73
8	Central Connecticut	61
4	LIU Brooklyn	73
5	St. Francis Brooklyn	50
(Pairings are reseeded after the first round)
2	Mount St. Mary's	56
7	Robert Morris	60
3	Saint Francis (PA)	75
6	Fairleigh Dickinson	84

Semifinals; Saturday, March 3, 2018; ESPN3/NEC Front Row
1	Wagner	75
7	Robert Morris	64
4	LIU Brooklyn	78
6	Fairleigh Dickinson	77

Championship; Tuesday, March 6, 2018; ESPN2
1	Wagner	61
4	LIU Brooklyn	71
