= 2016–17 LIU Brooklyn Blackbirds men's basketball team =

American college basketball season

2016–17 LIU Brooklyn Blackbirds men's basketball
- Conference: Northeast Conference
- Record: 20–12 (13–5 NEC)
- Head coach: Jack Perri (5th season)
- Assistant coaches: Kenyon Spears (2nd season); Jim Mack (2nd season); Tobe Carberry (1st season)
- Home arena: Steinberg Wellness Center; Barclays Center

2016–17 Northeast Conference men's basketball standings
	Conf.				Overall
Team	W		L	PCT	W		L	PCT
Mount St. Mary's †	14	–	4	.778	20	–	16	.556
LIU Brooklyn	13	–	5	.722	20	–	12	.625
Wagner	11	–	7	.611	16	–	14	.533
Saint Francis	11	–	7	.611	17	–	17	.500
Robert Morris	9	–	9	.500	14	–	19	.424
Bryant	9	–	9	.500	12	–	20	.375
Fairleigh Dickinson	9	–	9	.500	11	–	19	.367
Sacred Heart	8	–	10	.444	13	–	19	.406
Central Connecticut	4	–	14	.222	6	–	23	.207
St. Francis Brooklyn	2	–	16	.111	4	–	27	.129
† 2017 NEC tournament winner

The 2016–17 LIU Brooklyn Blackbirds men's basketball team represented The Brooklyn Campus of Long Island University during the 2016–17 NCAA Division I men's basketball season. The Blackbirds, led by fifth-year head coach Jack Perri, played their home games at the Steinberg Wellness Center, with several home games at the Barclays Center, and were members of the Northeast Conference. They finished the season 20–12, 13–5 in NEC play to finish in second place. In the NEC tournament, they lost to Robert Morris in the quarterfinals.

On March 20, 2017, head coach Jack Perri was fired after five seasons at LIU Brooklyn. Former UMass head coach Derek Kellogg was hired as the new head coach on April 18.

== Previous season ==
The Blackbirds finished the 2015–16 season 16–15, 9–9 in NEC play to finish in a tie for sixth place. They beat Sacred Heart in the quarterfinals of the NEC tournament before losing to Wagner.

== Roster ==
2016–17 Long Island Blackbirds men's basketball team
Players
Coaches

Pos.	#	Name	Height	Weight	Year	Hometown
F	33	Jerome Frink	6 ft 7 in (2.01 m)	230 lb (104 kg)	RS Sr	Jersey City, New Jersey
F/C	23	Glenn Feidanga	6 ft 8 in (2.03 m)	240 lb (109 kg)	Sr	Bangui, Central African Republic
G	3	Iverson Fleming	6 ft 1 in (1.85 m)	160 lb (73 kg)	Sr	North Brunswick, New Jersey
G	11	Joel Hernandez	6 ft 3 in (1.91 m)	180 lb (82 kg)	Sr	Teaneck, New Jersey
F	13	Nura Zanna	6 ft 7 in (2.01 m)	240 lb (109 kg)	RS Jr	Kaduna, Nigeria
F	14	Mark Parisi	5 ft 11 in (1.8 m)	165 lb (75 kg)	Jr	Queens, New York
G	12	Mitchell McMullen	5 ft 8 in (1.73 m)	165 lb (75 kg)	So	Schertz, Texas
G	22	Raul Frias	6 ft 1 in (1.85 m)	165 lb (75 kg)	So	Miami, Florida
F	0	Kwe Askew	6 ft 7 in (2.01 m)	205 lb (93 kg)	So	Stamford, Connecticut
G/F	24	Raiquan Clark	6 ft 4 in (1.93 m)	170 lb (77 kg)	So	New Haven, Connecticut
F/C	44	Ganlandou Cisse	6 ft 9 in (2.06 m)	215 lb (98 kg)	So	Dakar, Senegal
F	53	Julius van Sauers	6 ft 8 in (2.03 m)	210 lb (95 kg)	So	Amsterdam, Netherlands
G	2	Jashaun Agosto	5 ft 10 in (1.78 m)	165 lb (75 kg)	Fr	Seattle, Washington
G		Julian Batts	5 ft 11 in (1.8 m)	—	Fr	Jeannette, Pennsylvania
G		Ashtyn Bradley	6 ft 3 in (1.91 m)	150 lb (68 kg)	Fr	Fresno, Texas

Head coach

- Jack Perri (Bentley)

Assistant coach(es)

- Mark Calzonetti (Bentley)
- Jason Harris (Rhode Island College)
- Chuck Bridge (Springfield)

Legend

- (C) Team captain
- (S) Suspended
- (I) Ineligible
- (W) Walk-on
- Injured
- Current redshirt

Roster
Last update: 2015-10-11

== Schedule and results ==
Date time, TV	Rank^{#}	Opponent^{#}	Result	Record	Site (attendance) city, state
Non-conference regular season
November 11, 2016*; 7:00 pm		John Jay; Steve Wright Classic	W 78–40	1–0	Steinberg Wellness Center (598); Brooklyn, NY
November 16, 2016*; 7:00 pm		Loyola (MD)	W 65–61	2–0	Barclays Center (762); Brooklyn, NY
November 19, 2016*; 6:30 pm		vs. Northeastern; Steve Wright Classic	W 78–74	3–0	Case Gym (672); Boston, MA
November 20, 2016*; 4:30 pm		at Boston University; Steve Wright Classic	L 69–86	3–1	Case Gym (460); Boston, MA
November 21, 2016*; 3:00 pm		vs. Maine; Steve Wright Classic	W 71–66	4–1	Case Gym (52); Boston, MA
November 26, 2016*; 2:00 pm		at UMass Lowell	W 82–78	5–1	Costello Athletic Center (1,472); Lowell, MA
November 30, 2016*; 8:30 pm		at Hartford	W 75–68	6–1	Chase Arena at Reich Family Pavilion (1,413); Hartford, CT
December 3, 2016*; 4:00 pm		at Incarnate Word	L 79–90	6–2	McDermott Convocation Center (500); San Antonio, TX
December 6, 2016*; 7:00 pm		at North Carolina Central	L 56–79	6–3	McLendon–McDougald Gymnasium (772); Durham, NC
December 11, 2016*; 12:00 pm		vs. St. John's; Brooklyn Hoops Winter Festival	W 74–73	7–3	Barclays Center; Brooklyn, NY
December 14, 2016*; 8:00 pm		at Minnesota	L 66–76	7–4	Williams Arena (8,461); Minneapolis, MN
December 18, 2016*; 2:00 pm		Dartmouth	L 68–82	7–5	Steinberg Wellness Center (1,052); Brooklyn, NY
December 21, 2016*; 7:30 pm		Niagara	L 66–75	7–6	Barclays Center (1,219); Brooklyn, NY
Northeast Conference regular season
December 29, 2016; 4:30 pm		Mount St. Mary's	L 65–67	7–7 (0–1)	Steinberg Wellness Center (1,092); Brooklyn, NY
December 31, 2016; 4:30 pm		Bryant	W 74–63	8–7 (1–1)	Steinberg Wellness Center (638); Brooklyn, NY
January 5, 2017; 7:00 pm		at Robert Morris	W 65–54	9–7 (2–1)	Charles L. Sewall Center (427); Moon Township, PA
January 7, 2017; 4:00 pm		at Saint Francis (PA)	W 83–70	10–7 (3–1)	DeGol Arena (747); Loretto, PA
January 12, 2017; 7:00 pm		Central Connecticut	W 60–49	11–7 (4–1)	Steinberg Wellness Center (520); Brooklyn, NY
January 14, 2017; 3:00 pm		St. Francis Brooklyn	W 63–58	12–7 (5–1)	Steinberg Wellness Center (732); Brooklyn, NY
January 19, 2017; 7:00 pm		Wagner	W 76–69	13–7 (6–1)	Steinberg Wellness Center (732); Brooklyn, NY
January 21, 2017; 4:00 pm		at Fairleigh Dickinson	L 66–83	13–8 (6–2)	Rothman Center (1,108); Teaneck, NJ
January 26, 2017; 7:00 pm		at Sacred Heart	W 60–57	14–8 (7–2)	William H. Pitt Center; Fairfield, CT
January 28, 2017; 3:30 pm		at Central Connecticut	L 52–61	14–9 (7–3)	William H. Detrick Gymnasium (1,649); New Britain, CT
February 2, 2017; 7:00 pm		Robert Morris	L 63–67	14–10 (7–4)	Steinberg Wellness Center (687); Brooklyn, NY
February 4, 2017; 4:30 pm		Saint Francis (PA)	L 78–80	14–11 (7–5)	Steinberg Wellness Center (597); Brooklyn, NY
February 9, 2017; 7:00 pm		at Bryant	W 88–85 ^{OT}	15–11 (8–5)	Chace Athletic Center (872); Smithfield, RI
February 11, 2017; 4:30 pm		Fairleigh Dickinson	W 75–69	16–11 (9–5)	Steinberg Wellness Center (794); Brooklyn, NY
February 15, 2017; 6:00 pm, CBSSN		at St. Francis Brooklyn; Battle of Brooklyn	W 82–45	17–11 (10–5)	Generoso Pope Athletic Complex (826); Brooklyn, NY
February 18, 2017; 12:00 pm		Sacred Heart	W 83–82	18–11 (11–5)	Steinberg Wellness Center (752); Brooklyn, NY
February 23, 2017; 7:00 pm		at Mount St. Mary's	W 62–58	19–11 (12–5)	Knott Arena (2,765); Emmitsburg, MD
February 25, 2017; 4:00 pm		at Wagner	W 88–84 ^{OT}	20–11 (13–5)	Spiro Sports Center (1,382); Staten Island, NY
NEC tournament
March 1, 2017; 9:00 pm, FCS/MSG+	(2)	(7) Robert Morris; Quarterfinals	L 68–69	20–12	Steinberg Wellness Center (1,422); Brooklyn, NY
*Non-conference game. ^{#}Rankings from AP Poll. (#) Tournament seedings in parentheses. All times are in Eastern Time.
