= 2016–17 St. Francis Brooklyn Terriers men's basketball team =

American college basketball season

2016–17 St. Francis Brooklyn Terriers men's basketball
- Conference: Northeast Conference
- Record: 4–27 (2–16 NEC)
- Head coach: Glenn Braica (7th season)
- Assistant coaches: Clive Bentick (10th season); Ron Ganulin (4th season); Jamaal Womack (4th season)
- Home arena: Generoso Pope Athletic Complex

2016–17 Northeast Conference men's basketball standings
	Conf.				Overall
Team	W		L	PCT	W		L	PCT
Mount St. Mary's †	14	–	4	.778	20	–	16	.556
LIU Brooklyn	13	–	5	.722	20	–	12	.625
Wagner	11	–	7	.611	16	–	14	.533
Saint Francis	11	–	7	.611	17	–	17	.500
Robert Morris	9	–	9	.500	14	–	19	.424
Bryant	9	–	9	.500	12	–	20	.375
Fairleigh Dickinson	9	–	9	.500	11	–	19	.367
Sacred Heart	8	–	10	.444	13	–	19	.406
Central Connecticut	4	–	14	.222	6	–	23	.207
St. Francis Brooklyn	2	–	16	.111	4	–	27	.129
† 2017 NEC tournament winner

The 2016–17 St. Francis Brooklyn Terriers men's basketball team represented St. Francis College during the 2016–17 NCAA Division I men's basketball season. The Terrier's home games were played at the Generoso Pope Athletic Complex. The team has been a member of the Northeast Conference since 1981. They were coached by Glenn Braica who was in his seventh year at the helm of the Terriers. They finished the season 4–27, 2–16 in NEC play to finish in last place. It was the first time since the 1993–94 season that the Terriers finished ranked 10th in the NEC. It also represents the second consecutive losing season for the Terriers and the first season in Braica's tenure that the Terriers missed the NEC postseason.

== Previous season ==
The Terriers finished the 2015–16 season 5–17, 11–7 in NEC play to finish in a three-way tie for second place. They lost in the quarterfinals of the NEC tournament to Mount St. Mary's.

== Preseason ==
The Terriers lost five players to graduation; guard Tyreek Jewell, forward Chris Hooper, guard Miles Rockafeler, forward Antonio Jenifer and forward Amdy Fall. All, with the exception of Rockafeler, played significant roles for the Terriers last season. Jewell was the leading scorer, Fall and Jenifer were the leading rebounders and Hooper was a potent force off the bench averaging 11.5 ppg. The Terriers also lost 2 players to transfers; Marlon Alcindor and Jonathan Doss. It was also announced that native Icelander Dagur Kár Jónsson left the team in October to return to Iceland and play professionally.

As of May the Terriers have added four players to their roster; Rasheen Dunn, Gianni Ford, Darelle Porter Jr. and Robert Montgomery Jr. The Terriers also have two players, Jahmel Bodrick and Cori Johnson, which were enrolled at St. Francis College during the 2015–2016 season but were academically ineligible to play, and are now joining the team as Redshirt Freshman. Prior to the beginning of the season, it was announced that Cori Johnson suffered a knee injury that will require season ending surgery.

- Dunn, the 6'2" guard helped lead Thomas Jefferson to their first PSAL Class AA championship in 62 years and the program's first state federation title this past season. Dunn averaged 16.0 points, 5.0 rebounds, and 4.0 assists, and was named the Co-MVP after scoring 23 points in the title game at Madison Square Garden.
- Ford, at 6'1" he averaged 18.8 points, 4.5 rebounds, and 4.1 assists during his senior year at Boys & Girls this past season. He is regarded as one of the top shooters in the New York City and increased his production to 25.0 ppg. during the PSAL playoffs.
- Porter, at 6'5" he averaged 11.5 points and shot 46.3 percent from the floor this past season at Polk State College. He also grabbed 135 rebounds, shot 83.5 percent from the foul line, and was named a First Team All Suncoast Conference selection.
- Montgomery, the 6'6" forward produced 13.2 points, 10.0 rebounds, and 1.5 blocks per game at Mount Zion Prep in Baltimore, Maryland this past season.
- Johnson, the 6'9" center averaged 12.7 points and 10.8 rebounds per game as a senior at South Shore High School in 2014–2015
- Bodrick, at 6'6" he averaged 18.0 points and 7.0 rebounds as a senior at Our Savior Lutheran in 2014–2015

=== Departures ===
Name	Number	Pos.	Height	Weight	Year	Hometown	Notes
Chris Hooper	15	F	6'6"	240	Senior	Bronx, New York	Graduated, playing professionally for the Reading Rockets
Amdy Fall	32	F	6'7"	225	Senior	Manhattan, New York	Graduated
Tyreek Jewell	0	G	6'1"	185	Senior	Bronx, New York	Graduated, playing professionally for Satria Muda Pertamina Jakarta
Antonio Jenifer	3	F	6'7"	215	Senior	Hillcrest Heights, Maryland	Graduated
Miles Rockafeler	12	G	6'5"	195	Senior	Bronx, New York	Graduated
Jonathan Doss	14	F	6'4"	175	Junior (RS)	Chicago, Illinois	Transferred to Minnesota State–Moorhead
Marlon Alcindor	21	F	6'4"	185	Freshman (RS)	East Elmhurst, New York	Transferred to New Mexico Military Institute
Dagur Kár Jónsson	1	G	6'1"	165	Sophomore	Reykjanesbær, Iceland	Left the team to play professionally for Grindavik

=== Incoming transfers ===
Name	Number	Pos.	Height	Weight	Year	Hometown	Previous School
Darelle Porter Jr.	23	SG	6'5"	185	Junior	Pittsburgh, PA	Junior college transfer from Polk State College

=== Class of 2016 signees ===
College recruiting
Name	Hometown	School	Height	Weight	Commit date
Rasheem Dunn; SG	Brooklyn, NY	Thomas Jefferson High School	6 ft 2 in (1.88 m)	170 lb (77 kg)	October 17, 2015
Rasheem Dunn; SG	Recruit ratings: No ratings found				
Gianni Ford; PG	Brooklyn, NY	Boys and Girls High School	6 ft 0 in (1.83 m)	155 lb (70 kg)	April 22, 2016
Gianni Ford; PG	Recruit ratings: (56)				
Robert Montgomery Jr. SF	Gaithersburg, Maryland	Mount Zion Baptist Christian School	6 ft 7 in (2.01 m)	215 lb (98 kg)	May 2, 2016
Robert Montgomery Jr. SF	Recruit ratings: No ratings found				
Yaradyah Evans; SF	Brooklyn, NY	South Shore High School	6 ft 6 in (1.98 m)	190 lb (86 kg)	
Yaradyah Evans; SF	Recruit ratings: No ratings found				
Chauncey Hawkins; SG	Melville, NY	St. Anthony's High School	6 ft 2 in (1.88 m)	175 lb (79 kg)	
Chauncey Hawkins; SG	Recruit ratings: No ratings found				
Overall recruit ranking:
Note: In many cases, Scout, Rivals, 247Sports, On3, and ESPN may conflict in their listings of height and weight.; In these cases, the average was taken. ESPN grades are on a 100-point scale.; Sources: "2016 St. Francis Brooklyn Signees". Rivals.; "2016 St. Francis Brooklyn Signees". Scout.; "2016 St. Francis Brooklyn Signees". ESPN.; "Scout.com Team Recruiting Rankings". Scout.; "2016 Team Ranking". Rivals.; "2016 St. Francis Brooklyn Signees". 247Sports.

== Roster ==
2016–17 St. Francis Brooklyn Terriers men's basketball team
Players
Coaches

Pos.	#	Name	Height	Weight	Year	Previous school	Hometown
G	2	Yunus Hopkinson	5 ft 10 in (1.78 m)	180 lb (82 kg)	Sr	Lee Academy	Manhattan, New York
F	33	Jagos Lasic	6 ft 8 in (2.03 m)	200 lb (91 kg)	RS Jr	New Mexico Military Institute	Belgrade, Serbia
G	23	Darelle Porter	6 ft 6 in (1.98 m)	185 lb (84 kg)	Jr	Polk State College	Pittsburgh, Pennsylvania
G	10	Glenn Sanabria	5 ft 11 in (1.8 m)	180 lb (82 kg)	RS Jr	St. Peter's Boys High School	Staten Island, New York
G/F	4	Gunnar Ólafsson	6 ft 3 in (1.91 m)	195 lb (88 kg)	Jr	Menntaskólinn við Hamrahlíð	Reykjavík, Iceland
G	24	Sam Harris IV (W)	5 ft 10 in (1.78 m)	165 lb (75 kg)	Jr	Tampa Catholic High School	Tampa, Florida
F	13	Keon Williams	6 ft 4 in (1.93 m)	185 lb (84 kg)	RS So	John Hardin High School	Atlanta, Georgia
F	11	Joshua Nurse	6 ft 9 in (2.06 m)	210 lb (95 kg)	So	Queens High School of Teaching	Laurelton, New York
C	20	Cori Johnson (injured) (redshirt)	6 ft 9 in (2.06 m)	270 lb (122 kg)	RS Fr	South Shore High School	Brooklyn, New York
F	15	Jahmel Bodrick	6 ft 6 in (1.98 m)	230 lb (104 kg)	RS Fr	Our Savior Lutheran High School	Bronx, New York
G	0	Rasheem Dunn	6 ft 2 in (1.88 m)	170 lb (77 kg)	Fr	Thomas Jefferson High School	Brooklyn, New York
G	3	Gianni Ford	6 ft 0 in (1.83 m)	155 lb (70 kg)	Fr	Boys and Girls High School	Brooklyn, New York
F	5	Robert Montgomery Jr.	6 ft 7 in (2.01 m)	215 lb (98 kg)	Fr	Mount Zion Baptist Christian School	Gaithersburg, Maryland
F	5	Yaradyah Evans (redshirt)	6 ft 6 in (1.98 m)	190 lb (86 kg)	Fr	South Shore High School	Brooklyn, New York
G	15	Josh Nicholas (redshirt)	6 ft 2 in (1.88 m)	175 lb (79 kg)	Fr	St. Anthony's High School	Melville, New York

Head coach

- Glenn Braica (Queens College '89)

Assistant coach(es)

- Clive Bentick (Canisius '01)
- Ron Ganulin (LIU '68)
- Jamaal Womack (St. Francis '09)

Legend

- (C) Team captain
- (S) Suspended
- (I) Ineligible
- (W) Walk-on
- Injured
- Current redshirt

Roster
Last update: November 11, 2016

== Schedule and results ==
Date time, TV	Opponent	Result	Record	High points	High rebounds	High assists	Site (attendance) city, state
Non-conference regular season
Nov 13, 2016*; 2:00 pm	at NC State	L 61–86	0–1	14 – Sanabria	9 – Olaffson	3 – Sanabria, Hopkinson	PNC Arena (14,792); Raleigh, NC
Nov 15, 2016*; 7:00 pm	at No. 8 Virginia; Emerald Coast Classic	L 32–72	0–2	10 – Sanabria	5 – Hopkinson	1 – 3 tied	John Paul Jones Arena (14,471); Charlottesville, VA
Nov 21, 2016*; 6:30 pm	at Providence; Emerald Coast Classic	L 48–64	0–3	12 – Hopkinson	7 – Hopkinson	3 – Hopkinson	Dunkin' Donuts Center (4,208); Providence, RI
Nov 25, 2016*; 11:00 am	vs. Savannah State; Emerald Coast Classic; Pool B semifinal	W 97–91	1–3	28 – Sanabria	6 – 3 tied	4 – Sanabria	Northwest Florida State College Arena (320); Niceville, FL
Nov 26, 2016*; 1:30 pm	vs. UTRGV; Emerald Coast Classic; Pool B championship	W 71–61	1–4	16 – Sanabria	11 – Ólafsson	3 – Sanabri, Dunn	Northwest Florida State College Arena (200); Niceville, FL
Nov 30, 2016*; 7:00 pm	at Brown	L 71–81	1–5	16 – Dunn	7 – Williams, Ólafsson	3 – Hopkinson	Pizzitola Sports Center (529); Providence, RI
Dec 3, 2016*; 4:00 pm	at Army	L 56–76	1–6	20 – Dunn	10 – Williams	4 – Sanabria	Christl Arena (550); West Point, NY
Dec 5, 2016*; 7:00 pm	Lafayette	L 72–74	1–7	21 – Sanabria	10 – Williams	7 – Sanabria	Generoso Pope Athletic Complex (450); Brooklyn, NY
Dec 7, 2016*; 7:30 pm	Mount Saint Vincent	W 69–51	2–7	28 – Hopkinson	12 – Montgomery	4 – Hopkinson	Generoso Pope Athletic Complex (615); Brooklyn, NY
Dec 10, 2016*; 2:00 pm	at Canisius	L 81–91	2–8	22 – Ólafsson	5 – Ólafsson	7 – Hopkinson	Koessler Athletic Center (1,103); Buffalo, NY
Dec 17, 2016*; 7:00 pm	at Albany	L 60–87	2–9	13 – Dunn	4 – 3 tied	4 – Dunn, Hopkinson	SEFCU Arena (2,662); Albany, NY
Dec 20, 2016*; 7:00 pm	Manhattan	L 54–61	2–10	16 – Sanabria	9 – Williams	4 – Hopkinson	Generoso Pope Athletic Complex (443); Brooklyn, NY
Dec 23, 2016*; 2:00 pm	Saint Peter's	L 58–65	2–11	21 – Sanabria	7 – Williams	3 – Sanabria	Generoso Pope Athletic Complex (385); Brooklyn, NY
NEC regular season
Dec 29, 2016; 4:00 pm	Bryant	W 80–77 ^{OT}	3–11 (1–0)	24 – Dunn	10 – Ólafsson	7 – Sanabria	Generoso Pope Athletic Complex (513); Brooklyn, NY
Dec 31, 2016; 4:00 pm	Central Connecticut	W 86–77 ^{OT}	4–11 (2–0)	26 – Sanabria	7 – Montgomery, Ólafsson	5 – Dunn	Generoso Pope Athletic Complex (412); Brooklyn, NY
Jan 5, 2017; 7:00 pm	at Saint Francis (PA)	L 56–81	4–12 (2–1)	12 – Dunn	8 – Williams	2 – Nurse, Porter	DeGol Arena; Loretto, PA
Jan 7, 2017; 4:00 pm	at Robert Morris	L 58–62	4–13 (2–2)	20 – Sanabria	7 – Williams	2 – Ólafsson, Sanabria	Charles L. Sewall Center (843); Moon Township, PA
Jan 12, 2017; 7:00 pm	Sacred Heart	L 75–87	4–14 (2–3)	18 – Dunn	9 – Dunn	3 – Hopkinson	Generoso Pope Athletic Complex (373); Brooklyn, NY
Jan 14, 2017 pm	at LIU Brooklyn	L 58–63	4–15 (2–4)	21 – Dunn	8 – Dunn	3 – Sanabria	Steinberg Wellness Center (732); Brooklyn, NY
Jan 19, 2017; 7:00 pm	at Fairleigh Dickinson	L 40–57	4–16 (2–5)	10 – Ford, Hopkinson	8 – Bodrick	5 – Hopkinson	Rothman Center (697); Hackensack, NJ
Jan 21, 2017; 4:00 pm	Mount St. Mary's	L 47–55	4–17 (2–6)	12 – Dunn	9 – Dunn	2 – Hopkinson	Generoso Pope Athletic Complex (672); Brooklyn, NY
Jan 26, 2017; 7:00 pm	Fairleigh Dickinson	L 73–79	4–18 (2–7)	20 – Dunn	7 – Dunn	3 – Dunn	Generoso Pope Athletic Complex (634); Brooklyn, NY
Jan 28, 2017; 4:00 pm	at Wagner	L 64–66	4–19 (2–8)	16 – Hopkinson	8 – Dunn	5 – Dunn	Spiro Sports Center (1,622); Staten Island, NY
Feb 2, 2017; 7:00 pm	Saint Francis (PA)	L 61–78	4–20 (2–9)	10 – Ford	10 – Ólafsson	3 – Dunn, Ford	Generoso Pope Athletic Complex (347); Brooklyn, NY
Feb 4, 2017; 4:00 pm	Robert Morris	L 54–78	4–21 (2–10)	15 – Dunn	10 – Dunn	2 – Hopkinson	Generoso Pope Athletic Complex (648); Brooklyn, NY
Feb 9, 2017; 9:00 pm	at Sacred Heart	L 65–80	4–22 (2–11)	34 – Hopkinson	9 – Dunn	3 – Dunn	William H. Pitt Center (1,236); Fairfield, CT
Feb 11, 2017; 4:00 pm	at Bryant	L 69–80	4–23 (2–12)	15 – Sanabria	9 – Montgomery	5 – Sanabria	Chace Athletic Center (560); Smithfield, RI
Feb 15, 2017; 6:00 pm, CBSSN	LIU Brooklyn; Battle of Brooklyn	L 45–82	4–24 (2–13)	17 – Dunn	7 – Dunn	3 – Dunn	Generoso Pope Athletic Complex (826); Brooklyn, NY
Feb 18, 2017; 4:00 pm	Wagner	L 55–73	4–25 (2–14)	12 – Sanabria	6 – Dunn	4 – Hopkinson	Generoso Pope Athletic Complex (533); Brooklyn, NY
Feb 23, 2017; 7:00 pm	at Central Connecticut	L 53–62	4–26 (2–15)	12 – Hopkinson	8 – Dunn	2 – Dunn, Lasic	William H. Detrick Gymnasium (1,516); New Britain, CT
Feb 25, 2017; 4:00 pm	at Mount St. Mary's	L 62–77	4–27 (2–16)	23 – Ford	7 – Porter	2 – Hopkinson, Lasic	Knott Arena (2,470); Emmitsburg, MD
*Non-conference game. ^{#}Rankings from AP Poll. (#) Tournament seedings in parentheses. All times are in Eastern Time.

== Season statistics ==
Individual Player Statistics (As of March 1, 2017)
			Minutes		Scoring		Total FGs			3-point FGs			Free-Throws			Rebounds							
Player	GP	GS	Tot	Avg	Pts	Avg	FG	FGA	Pct	3FG	3FA	Pct	FT	FTA	Pct	Off	Def	Tot	Avg	A	TO	Blk	Stl
Sanabria, Glenn	30	30	998	33.3	371	12.4	120	363	.331	68	205	.332	63	87	.724	24	39	63	2.1	74	43	6	37
Hopkinson, Yunus	31	31	899	29.0	348	11.2	108	370	.292	65	232	.280	67	92	.728	19	60	79	2.5	67	68	1	31
Dunn, Rasheem	30	11	897	29.9	394	13.1	129	333	.387	24	109	.220	112	162	.691	44	109	153	5.1	49	52	3	43
Ólafsson, Gunnar	27	25	602	22.3	119	4.4	45	116	.388	16	59	.271	13	30	.433	46	91	137	5.1	17	25	4	19
Williams, Keon	31	21	673	21.7	108	3.5	37	131	.282	10	55	.182	24	40	.600	39	95	134	4.3	17	21	8	23
Montgomery, Robert	30	14	560	18.7	155	5.2	59	138	.428	2	6	.333	35	60	.583	51	86	137	4.6	14	53	32	11
Porter, Darelle	26	0	265	10.2	74	2.8	27	85	.318	8	33	.242	12	19	.632	21	37	58	2.2	8	15	10	15
Bodrick, Jahmel	31	7	454	14.6	121	3.9	49	129	.380	1	9	.111	22	38	.579	29	50	79	2.5	7	37	4	8
Nurse, Joshua	30	14	290	9.7	54	1.8	18	38	.474	0	0	0	18	41	.439	27	37	64	2.1	12	25	16	8
Ford, Gianni	26	0	376	14.5	124	4.8	41	126	.325	21	69	.304	21	29	.724	8	18	26	1.0	11	17	2	9
Lasic, Jagos	25	2	226	9.0	52	2.1	17	41	.415	6	14	.429	12	16	0.750	9	24	33	1.3	11	13	3	3
Harris, Sam	12	0	11	0.9	1	0.1	0	1	.000	0	1	.000	1	2	.500	1	1	2	0.2	0	0	0	1
Team																72	42	114			10		
Total	31		6251		1921	62.0	650	1870	.347	221	792	.279	400	616	.649	390	689	1079	34.8	287	379	89	208
Opponents	31		6251		2284	73.7	795	1677	.474	161	458	.352	533	783	.681	338	955	1293	41.7	377	433	106	166

Legend
GP	Games played	GS	Games started	Avg	Average per game
FG	Field-goals made	FGA	Field-goal attempts	Off	Offensive rebounds
Def	Defensive rebounds	A	Assists	TO	Turnovers
Blk	Blocks	Stl	Steals	High	Team high

== Awards and honors ==
Rasheem Dunn

- NEC men's basketball Rookie of the Week award (December 12, 2016 – December 18, 2016). Dunn posted team-highs with 13 points and four assists at Albany on December 17, 2016.
- NEC men's basketball Rookie of the Week award (December 26, 2016 – January 1, 2017). Dunn averaged 21.5 points, 6.5 rebounds and 3.5 assists on the week as he helped lead the Terriers to two victories.
- NEC men's basketball Rookie of the Week award (January 23, 2017 – January 29, 2017). Dunn averaged 15.5 points, 7.5 rebounds, 5.0 assists, 3.0 steals and committed just one turnover 77 minutes of play against Fairleigh Dickinson and Wagner.
- Selected to the 2016–17 NEC men's basketball All-Rookie team

== See also ==
- 2016–17 St. Francis Brooklyn Terriers women's basketball team
