= 2016–17 Northeast Conference men's basketball season =

- League: NCAA Division I
- Sport: Basketball
- Teams: 10
- TV partner(s): NEC Front Row, ESPN2, MSG, FCS, Regional Sports Networks

Regular Season
- First place: Mount St. Mary's
- Runners-up: LIU Brooklyn
- Season MVP: Jerome Frink, LIU
- Top scorer: Nisre Zouzoua, LIU

NEC Tournament
- Champions: Mount St. Mary's
- Runners-up: Saint Francis (PA)
- Finals MVP: Elijah Long, MSM

Northeast Conference men's basketball seasons
- ← 2015–16 2017–18 →

2016–17 Northeast Conference men's basketball standings
	Conf.				Overall
Team	W		L	PCT	W		L	PCT
Mount St. Mary's †	14	–	4	.778	20	–	16	.556
LIU Brooklyn	13	–	5	.722	20	–	12	.625
Wagner	11	–	7	.611	16	–	14	.533
Saint Francis	11	–	7	.611	17	–	17	.500
Robert Morris	9	–	9	.500	14	–	19	.424
Bryant	9	–	9	.500	12	–	20	.375
Fairleigh Dickinson	9	–	9	.500	11	–	19	.367
Sacred Heart	8	–	10	.444	13	–	19	.406
Central Connecticut	4	–	14	.222	6	–	23	.207
St. Francis Brooklyn	2	–	16	.111	4	–	27	.129
† 2017 NEC tournament winner

The 2016–17 NEC men's basketball season began with practices in October 2016, followed by the start of the 2016–17 NCAA Division I men's basketball season in November. Conference play started in late December and concluded in February 2017.

Mount St. Mary's clinched the regular season NEC championship with a win over St. Francis Brooklyn on February 25, 2017, marking their first NEC regular season crown in 21 years. LIU Brooklyn finished in second place in the regular season.

The NEC tournament was held from March 1 through March 7 with the higher-seeded team hosting each game. Mount St. Mary's defeated Saint Francis (PA) to win the NEC Tournament championship. As a result, Mount St. Mary's received the conference's bid to the NCAA tournament. Saint Francis (PA) received an invitation to CollegeInsider.com Postseason Tournament.

== Head coaches ==
=== Coaching changes ===
On April 6, 2016, Central Connecticut announced Donyell Marshall as the 10th head coach in program history. Marshall replaced Howie Dickenman, who retired after 20 years at Central Connecticut.

=== Coaches ===
Team	Head coach	Previous job	Year at school	Overall record	NEC record	NEC Tournament championships	Postseason Tournament championships
Bryant	Tim O'Shea	Ohio	9	81–163	48–76	0	0
Central Connecticut	Donyell Marshall	Buffalo (asst.)	1	0–0	0–0	0	0
Fairleigh Dickinson	Greg Herenda	UMass Lowell	4	36–57	20–32	1	0
LIU Brooklyn	Jack Perri	LIU Brooklyn (asst.)	5	57–67	33–37	1	0
Mount St. Mary's	Jamion Christian	VCU (asst.)	5	63–65	41–29	1	0
Robert Morris	Andrew Toole	Robert Morris (asst.)	7	120–87	73–33	1	0
Sacred Heart	Anthony Latina	Sacred Heart (asst.)	4	32–61	22–30	0	0
St. Francis Brooklyn	Glenn Braica	St. John's (asst.)	7	98–91	65–41	0	0
Saint Francis (PA)	Rob Krimmel	Saint Francis (PA) (asst.)	5	44–78	30–40	0	0
Wagner	Bashir Mason	Wagner (asst.)	5	71–55	45–25	0	0

Notes:

- All records, appearances, titles, etc. are from time with current school only.
- Year at school includes 2016–17 season.
- Overall and NEC/NCAA records are from time at current school and are before the beginning of the 2016–17 season.
- Previous jobs are head coaching jobs unless otherwise noted.

== Preseason ==
=== Preseason Coaches Poll ===
Rank	Team
1.	Fairleigh Dickinson (6)
2.	Wagner (4)
3.	Bryant
4.	LIU Brooklyn
4.	Mount St. Mary's
6.	Robert Morris
7.	St. Francis Brooklyn
8.	Sacred Heart
9.	Saint Francis (PA)
10.	Central Connecticut

() first place votes

=== Preseason All-NEC team ===
Recipient	School
Earl Potts, Jr.	Fairleigh Dickinson
Corey Henson	Wagner
Jerome Frink	LIU Brooklyn
Michael Carey	Wagner
Darian Anderson	Fairleigh Dickinson

== NEC regular season ==
=== Conference matrix ===
This table summarizes the head-to-head results between teams in conference play.

	Bryant	Central Conn.	FDU	LIU Brooklyn	Mount St. Mary's	RMU	Sacred Heart	St. Francis Brooklyn	Saint Francis (PA)	Wagner
vs. Bryant	–	0–2	1–1	2–0	1–1	0–2	2–0	1–1	1–1	1–1
vs. Central Conn.	2–0	–	2–0	1–1	1–1	2–0	2–0	1–1	1–1	2–0
vs. Fairleigh Dickinson	1–1	0–2	–	1–1	2–0	1–1	2–0	0–2	1–1	1–1
vs. LIU Brooklyn	0–2	1–1	1–1	–	1–1	1–1	0–2	0–2	1–1	0–2
vs. Mount St. Mary's	1–1	1–1	0–2	1–1	–	0–2	0–2	0–2	0–2	1–1
vs. Robert Morris	2–0	0–2	1–1	1–1	2–0	–	0–2	0–2	2–0	1–1
vs. Sacred Heart	0–2	0–2	0–2	2–0	2–0	2–0	–	0–2	2–0	2–0
vs. St. Francis Brooklyn	1–1	1–1	2–0	2–0	2–0	2–0	2–0	–	2–0	2–0
vs. Saint Francis (PA)	1–1	1–1	1–1	1–1	2–0	0–2	0–2	0–2	–	1–1
vs. Wagner	1–1	0–2	1–1	2–0	1–1	1–1	0–2	0–2	1–1	–
Total	9–9	4–14	9–9	13–5	14–4	9–9	8–10	2–16	11–7	11–7

=== Player of the week ===
Throughout the regular season, the Northeast Conference offices named a player of the week and a rookie of the week each Monday.

Date	Player of the week	Rookie of the week
November 14, 2016	Mike Aaman, Wagner	Sabastian Townes, St. Francis Brooklyn
November 21, 2016	Quincy McKnight, Sacred Heart	Jashaun Agosto, LIU Brooklyn
November 28, 2016	Nisre Zouzoua, St. Francis Brooklyn; Iverson Fleming, LIU Brooklyn	Keith Braxton, Saint Francis (PA)
December 5, 2016	Joseph Lopez, Sacred Heart	Keith Braxton, Saint Francis (PA)
December 12, 2016	Iverson Fleming, LIU Brooklyn	Adam Grant, St. Francis Brooklyn
December 19, 2016	Quincy McKnight, Sacred Heart	Rasheem Dunn, St. Francis Brooklyn
December 26, 2016	Kavon Stewart, Robert Morris	Ikenna Ndugba, Bryant
January 2, 2017	Darian Anderson, Fairleigh Dickinson	Rasheem Dunn, St. Francis Brooklyn; Keith Braxton, Saint Francis (PA)
January 9, 2017	Jerome Frink, LIU Brooklyn; Michael Carey, Wagner	Randall Gaskins, Jr., Saint Francis (PA)
January 16, 2017	Quincy McKnight, Sacred Heart	Adam Grant, St. Francis Brooklyn; Keith Braxton, Saint Francis (PA)
January 23, 2017	Darian Anderson, Fairleigh Dickinson	Keith Braxton, Saint Francis (PA)
January 30, 2017	Isaiah Blackmon, Saint Francis (PA)	Rasheem Dunn, St. Francis Brooklyn
February 6, 2017	Josh Nebo, Saint Francis (PA)	Keith Braxton, Saint Francis (PA)
February 13, 2017	Jerome Frink, LIU Brooklyn	Blake Francis, Wagner
February 20, 2017	Raiquan Clark, LIU Brooklyn	Keith Braxton, Saint Francis (PA)
February 25, 2017	Iverson Fleming, LIU Brooklyn	Dachon Burke, Robert Morris

== All-NEC honors and awards ==
Following the regular season, the conference selected outstanding performers based on a poll of league coaches.

Honor	Recipient
Player of the Year	Jerome Frink, LIU
Coach of the Year	Jamion Christian, MSM
Defensive Player of the Year	Josh Nebo, SFU
Rookie of the Year	Keith Braxton, SFU
Most Improved Player of the Year	Iverson Fleming, LIU
All-NEC First Team	Michael Carrey, WAG
All-NEC First Team	Elijah Long, MSM
All-NEC First Team	Jerome Frink, LIU
All-NEC First Team	Quincy McKnight, SHU
All-NEC First Team	Nisre Zouzoua, BRY
All-NEC Second Team	Darian Anderson, FDU
All-NEC Second Team	Keith Braxton, SFU
All-NEC Second Team	Corey Henson, WAG
All-NEC Second Team	Isaiah Still, RMU
All-NEC Second Team	Junior Robinson, MSM
All-NEC Third Team	Isaiah Blackmon, SFU
All-NEC Third Team	Iverson Fleming, LIU
All-NEC Third Team	Stephan Jiggets, FDU
All-NEC Third Team	Joseph Lopez, SHU
All-NEC Third Team	Josh Nebo, SFU
All-NEC Rookie Team	Rasheem Dunn, SFC
All-NEC Rookie Team	Jashuan Agosto, LIU
All-NEC Rookie Team	Keith Braxton, SFU
All-NEC Rookie Team	Adam Grant, BRY
All-NEC Rookie Team	Miles Wilson, MSM

== Postseason ==
=== NEC Tournament ===
Quarterfinals; Wednesday, March 1
1	Mount St. Mary's	76
8	Sacred Heart	73
4	Saint Francis (PA)	100
5	Bryant	78
(Pairings are reseeded after the first round)
2	LIU Brooklyn	68
7	Robert Morris	69
3	Wagner	72
6	Fairleigh Dickinson	70

Semifinals; Saturday, March 4
1	Mount St. Mary's	75
7	Robert Morris	66
3	Wagner	70
4	Saint Francis (PA)	71

Championship; Tuesday, March 7
1	Mount St. Mary's	71
4	Saint Francis (PA)	61

All games will be played at the venue of the higher seed

=== NCAA tournament ===
Seed	Region	School	First Four	First round	Second round	Sweet 16	Elite Eight	Final Four	Championship
16	East	Mount St. Mary's	W, 67–66 vs. #16 New Orleans – (Dayton)	L, 56–76 vs. #1 Villanova – (KeyBank Center)					

=== CollegeInsider.com Postseason Tournament ===
School	1st Round	2nd Round	Quarterfinals	Semifinals	Championship
Saint Francis (PA)	W, 78–76 vs. #1 Jacksonville	L, 79–87 vs. #4 UMBC			

== Milestones and records ==
- On November 11, 2016, the Wagner Seahawks upset 18th ranked UConn on the road, marking one of the most significant wins in program history.

== See also ==
2016–17 Northeast Conference women's basketball season
