= Keith Braxton =

American basketball player (born 1997)

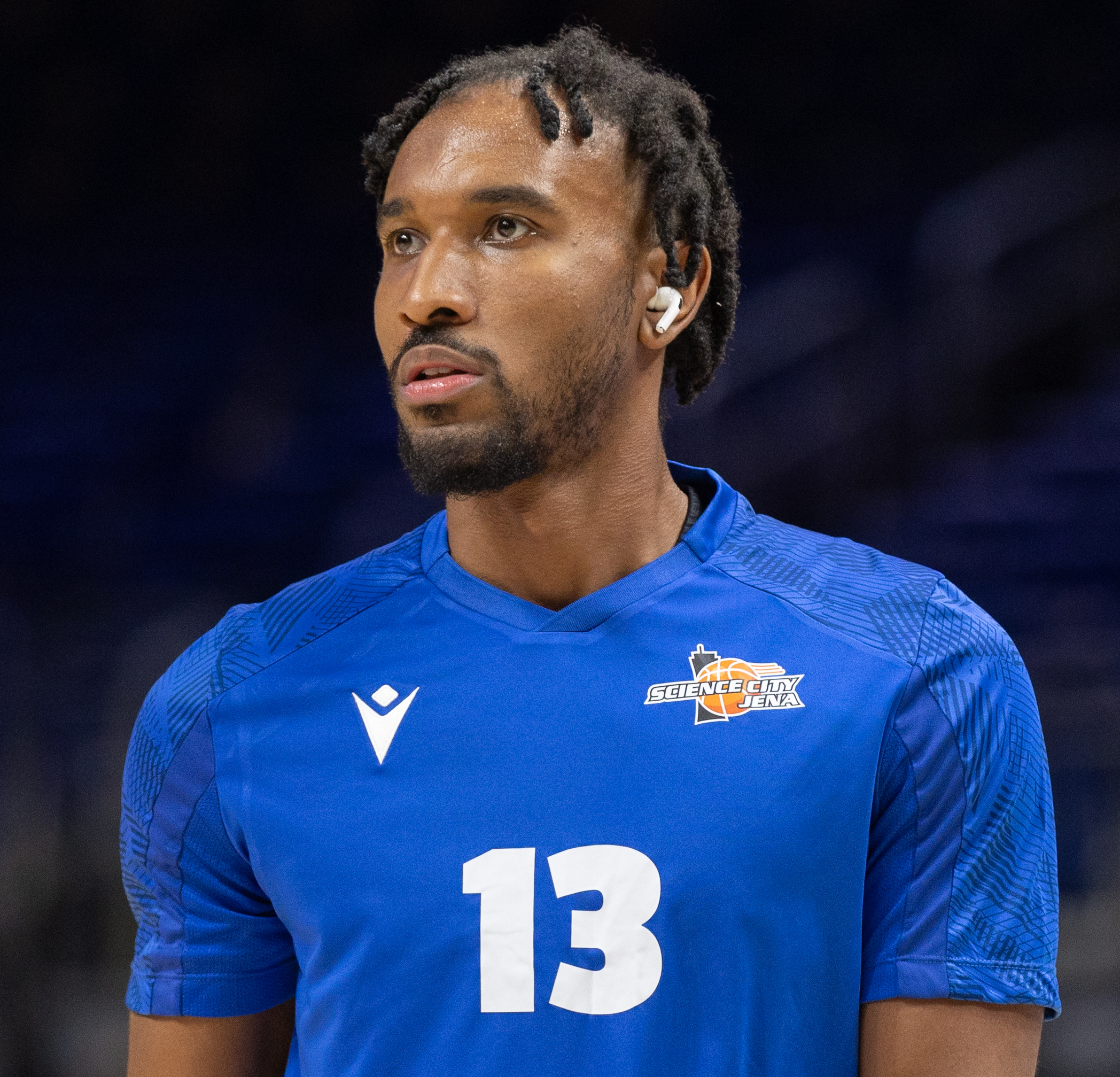
- Braxton with Jena in 2025

No. 13 – SG Apes
- Position: Shooting guard
- League: The League

Personal information
- Born: May 16, 1997 (age 29) Glassboro, New Jersey, U.S.
- Listed height: 6 ft 5 in (1.96 m)
- Listed weight: 210 lb (95 kg)

Career information
- High school: Delsea (Franklinville, New Jersey); Lawrenceville School (Lawrence, New Jersey)
- College: Saint Francis (PA) (2016–2020)
- NBA draft: 2020: undrafted
- Playing career: 2021–present

Career history
- 2021–2022: Maccabi Ma'ale Adumim
- 2022–2024: Mons-Hainaut
- 2024–2025: VfL AstroStars Bochum
- 2025–2026: Science City Jena
- 2026–present: SG Apes

Career highlights
- ProA Player Of The Year (2024/25); AP Honorable Mention All-American (2019); NEC Player of the Year (2019); 3× First-team All-NEC (2018–2020); Second-team All-NEC (2017); NEC Rookie of the Year (2017)

Keith Lee Braxton JR (born May 16, 1997) is an American professional basketball player for the SG Apes of the Mongolian The League. He played college basketball for the Saint Francis Red Flash.

== Early life ==
Braxton grew up in Glassboro, New Jersey and attended Delsea Regional High School in nearby Franklinville. As a senior, he averaged 22.0 points and 9.8 rebounds per game and led the Crusaders to 24–6 record and the South Jersey Group 3 title game. After receiving scholarship offers from only Division II schools, Braxton opted to complete a post-graduate year at the Lawrenceville School.

== College career ==
In his first year with the Red Flash, Braxton averaged 13.1 points along with 8.6 rebounds, 3.2 assists, and 1.4 steals per game. For his play he was named second team All-Northeast Conference (NEC) and the NEC Rookie of the Year. In his sophomore season, Braxton averaged 17.5 points and 9.5 rebounds per game and was named first team All-NEC.

As a junior, Braxton averaged 16.4 points (5th in the NEC), 9.7 rebounds (1st), 3.9 assists (7th) and 1.7 steals (2nd) per game and was named the 2019 Northeast Conference Player of the Year. Following the end of the season Braxton declared himself eligible for the 2019 NBA draft but did not hire an agent, thus retaining his eligibility. He ultimately decided to withdraw from the draft and return to St. Francis for his senior season. Braxton became the fourth player in Saint Francis's history to record 1,000 rebounds on January 4, 2020, in a 93–67 win over Central Connecticut. Braxton scored his 2,000th career point in the Red Flash's final regular season game against Robert Morris, making him the first player in Northeast Conference history to record 2,000 points and 1,000 rebounds in his career. He finished with 24 points and 12 rebounds in the loss. Braxton was named first team All-NEC for a third consecutive season. He averaged 17.6 points, 7.5 rebounds, 3.8 assists, and 1.3 steals per game as a senior.

== Professional career ==
Braxton played for WoCo Showtime, a team featuring mainly Wofford alumni, in The Basketball Tournament 2021. On July 29, 2021, Braxton signed with Maccabi Ma'ale Adumim of the Israeli Liga Leumit.

On July 8, 2022, Braxton signed with Belgian team Belfius Mons-Hainaut of the BNXT League.

In August, 2024, he signed a contract with the VfL AstroStars Bochum of the German second tier league ProA. He helped the team play the best season of the club's history and was voted ProA Player of the year of the 2024/25 season.

In June, 2025, he signed with Science City Jena, the ProA finalist of the previous season which promoted to the Basketball Bundesliga.

== Career statistics ==
Legend
GP	Games played	GS	Games started	MPG	Minutes per game
FG%	Field goal percentage	3P%	3-point field goal percentage	FT%	Free throw percentage
RPG	Rebounds per game	APG	Assists per game	SPG	Steals per game
BPG	Blocks per game	PPG	Points per game	**Bold**	Career high

=== College ===
Year	Team	GP	GS	MPG	FG%	3P%	FT%	RPG	APG	SPG	BPG	PPG
2016–17	Saint Francis (PA)	**34**	30	33.4	**.532**	**.439**	.765	8.6	3.1	1.4	.4	13.1
2017–18	Saint Francis (PA)	31	31	35.2	.475	.367	.795	9.5	3.3	**1.7**	**.6**	17.2
2018–19	Saint Francis (PA)	33	**32**	34.2	.457	.339	.769	**9.8**	**3.8**	1.5	.3	16.0
2019–20	Saint Francis (PA)	32	**32**	**36.1**	.464	.316	**.832**	7.5	**3.8**	1.3	.3	**17.6**
Career		130	125	34.7	.479	.354	.792	8.8	3.5	1.5	.4	15.9

=== Professional ===
Year	Team	GP	GS	MPG	FG%	3P%	FT%	RPG	APG	SPG	BPG	PPG
2024/25 ProA Season	VfL AstroStars Bochum	36	NA	33:28	.487	.355	.743	6.2	4.9	1.7	.3	19.5

== See also ==
- List of NCAA Division I men's basketball players with 2000 points and 1000 rebounds
