= 2016–17 Mount St. Mary's Mountaineers men's basketball team =

American college basketball season

2016–17 Mount St. Mary's Mountaineers men's basketball
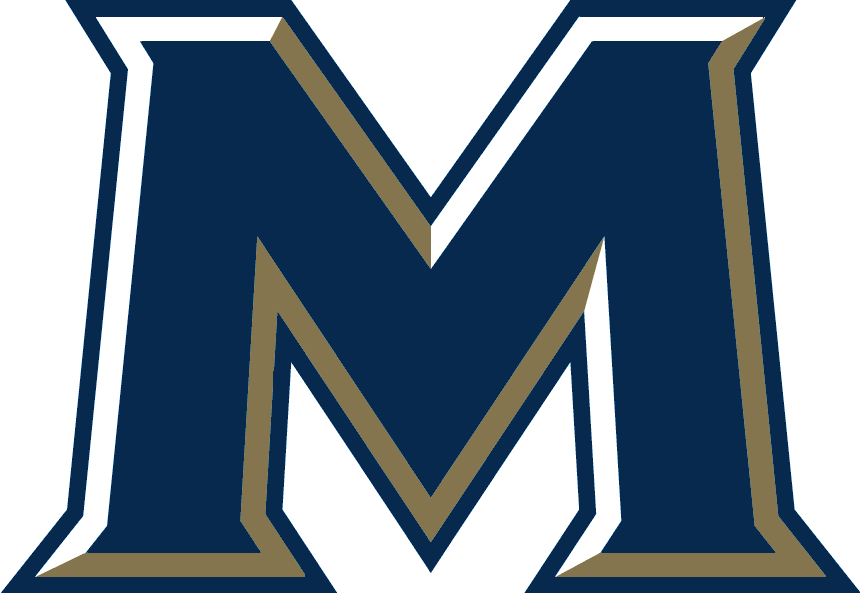

NEC regular season and tournament champions

NCAA tournament, First Round
- Conference: Northeast Conference
- Record: 20–16 (14–4 NEC)
- Head coach: Jamion Christian (5th season)
- Assistant coaches: Will Holland; Graham Bousley; Julian Boatner
- Home arena: Knott Arena

2016–17 Northeast Conference men's basketball standings
	Conf.				Overall
Team	W		L	PCT	W		L	PCT
Mount St. Mary's †	14	–	4	.778	20	–	16	.556
LIU Brooklyn	13	–	5	.722	20	–	12	.625
Wagner	11	–	7	.611	16	–	14	.533
Saint Francis	11	–	7	.611	17	–	17	.500
Robert Morris	9	–	9	.500	14	–	19	.424
Bryant	9	–	9	.500	12	–	20	.375
Fairleigh Dickinson	9	–	9	.500	11	–	19	.367
Sacred Heart	8	–	10	.444	13	–	19	.406
Central Connecticut	4	–	14	.222	6	–	23	.207
St. Francis Brooklyn	2	–	16	.111	4	–	27	.129
† 2017 NEC tournament winner

The 2016–17 Mount St. Mary's Mountaineers men's basketball team represented Mount St. Mary's University during the 2016–17 NCAA Division I men's basketball season. The Mountaineers, led by fifth-year head coach Jamion Christian, played their home games at Knott Arena in Emmitsburg, Maryland as members of the Northeast Conference. They finished the season 20–16, 14–4 in NEC play to win the regular season championship, their first championship in 21 years. In the NEC tournament, they defeated Sacred Heart, Robert Morris, and Saint Francis (PA) to win the tournament championship. As a result, they received the conference's automatic bid to the NCAA tournament. As a No. 16 seed in the East region, they beat New Orleans in the First Four before losing in the first round to No. 1-seeded and ranked Villanova.

Head coach Jamion Christian was named NEC Coach of the Year.

== Previous season ==
The Mountaineers finished the 2015–16 season 14–19, 10–8 in NEC play to finish in fifth place. They defeated St. Francis Brooklyn in the NEC tournament before losing to Fairleigh Dickinson in the semifinals.

== Roster ==
2016–17 Mount St. Mary's Mountaineers men's basketball team
Players
Coaches

Pos.	#	Name	Height	Weight	Year	Previous school	Hometown
G	4	Khalid Nwandu	6 ft 3 in (1.91 m)	180 lb (82 kg)	Sr	Northeastern High School	York, Pennsylvania
F	11	Will Miller	6 ft 6 in (1.98 m)	200 lb (91 kg)	Sr	Highland Park High School	Dallas, Texas
G	12	Charles Glover	6 ft 1 in (1.85 m)	190 lb (86 kg)	RS Jr	Gonzaga College High School	Bowie, Maryland
G	0	Junior Robinson	5 ft 5 in (1.65 m)	165 lb (75 kg)	Jr	Eastern Alamance High School	Mebane, North Carolina
F	5	Chris Wray	6 ft 8 in (2.03 m)	190 lb (86 kg)	Jr	Fishburne Military School	Shelby, North Carolina
C	1	Mawdo Sallah	6 ft 8 in (2.03 m)	225 lb (102 kg)	Jr	Broadfording Christian Academy	Latri Kunda, Gambia
G	23	Greg Alexander	6 ft 4 in (1.93 m)	210 lb (95 kg)	Jr	Kecoughtan	Hampton, Virginia
G	55	Elijah Mitrou-Long	6 ft 0 in (1.83 m)	175 lb (79 kg)	So	The John Carroll School	Mississauga, Ontario
G	20	Sean Gurdon	6 ft 1 in (1.85 m)	170 lb (77 kg)	So	Pine Forge Academy	Bowie, Maryland
G	25	Bryce Thurston	6 ft 5 in (1.96 m)	200 lb (91 kg)	RS Fr	Montverde Academy	Baltimore, Maryland
G	3	Jonah Antonio	6 ft 5 in (1.96 m)	175 lb (79 kg)	Fr	Sunrise Christian Academy	Perth, Australia
G	10	Miles Wilson	6 ft 5 in (1.96 m)	165 lb (75 kg)	Fr	Mount St. Joseph	Reisterstown, Maryland
G	21	Randy Miller Jr.	6 ft 3 in (1.91 m)	180 lb (82 kg)	Fr	Mount St. Joseph	Baltimore, Maryland
F	30	Jack Vukelich	6 ft 9 in (2.06 m)	185 lb (84 kg)	Fr	Trinity	Mechanicsburg, Pennsylvania
C	54	Ryan Gomes	6 ft 10 in (2.08 m)	220 lb (100 kg)	Fr	Friends School	Westminster, Maryland

Head coach

- Jamion Christian

Assistant coach(es)

- Ben Wilkins
- Darryl Bruce
- Donny Lind

Legend

- (C) Team captain
- (S) Suspended
- (I) Ineligible
- (W) Walk-on
- Injured
- Current redshirt

Roster
Last update: 08/25/2015

== Schedule and results ==
Date time, TV	Rank^{#}	Opponent^{#}	Result	Record	Site (attendance) city, state
Exhibition
November 5, 2016*; 4:00 pm		Hood	W 89–65		Knott Arena (1,151); Emmitsburg, MD
Non-conference regular season
November 11, 2016*; 7:00 pm, RTPT		at No. 20 West Virginia	L 59–87	0–1	WVU Coliseum (10,510); Morgantown, WV
November 14, 2016*; 8:00 pm		at No. 20 Iowa State	L 55–73	0–2	Hilton Coliseum (13,981); Ames, IA
November 16, 2016*; 8:00 pm		at Minnesota; Golden Gopher Invitational	L 56–80	0–3	Williams Arena (7,940); Minneapolis, MN
November 18, 2016*; 7:30 pm		at George Mason	W 78–76 ^{OT}	1–3	EagleBank Arena (3,487); Fairfax, VA
November 21, 2016*; 8:00 pm		at Southern Illinois; Golden Gopher Invitational	L 63–73	1–4	SIU Arena (3,971); Carbondale, IL
November 23, 2016*; 8:00 pm		at UT Arlington; Golden Gopher Invitational	L 71–80	1–5	College Park Center (1,360); Arlington, TX
November 26, 2016*; 7:00 pm		at No. 25 Michigan	L 47–64	1–6	Crisler Center (9,410); Ann Arbor, MI
November 28, 2016*; 8:00 pm		at Arkansas; Golden Gopher Invitational	L 76–89	1–7	Bud Walton Arena (13,321); Fayetteville, AR
December 3, 2016*; 4:00 pm		at Loyola (MD)	L 57–64	1–8	Reitz Arena (1,478); Baltimore, MD
December 7, 2016*; 7:00 pm		UMBC	L 70–78	1–9	Knott Arena (1,450); Emmitsburg, MD
December 10, 2016*; 4:00 pm		Lehigh	L 71–90	1–10	Knott Arena (1,464); Emmitsburg, MD
December 19, 2016*; 4:30 pm		Bucknell	L 65–81	1–11	Sojka Pavilion (1,952); Lewisburg, PA
December 22, 2016*; 7:00 pm		Coppin State	W 87–49	2–11	Knott Arena (1,080); Emmitsburg, MD
NEC regular season
December 29, 2016; 4:30 pm		at LIU Brooklyn	W 67–65	3–11 (1–0)	Steinberg Wellness Center (1,092); Brooklyn, NY
December 31, 2016; 2:00 pm		Wagner	W 57–56	4–11 (2–0)	Knott Arena (1,707); Emmitsburg, MD
January 5, 2017; 7:00 pm		at Bryant	L 71–72	4–12 (2–1)	Chace Athletic Center (210); Smithfield, RI
January 7, 2017; 3:30 pm		at Central Connecticut	W 77–68	5–12 (3–1)	William H. Detrick Gymnasium (457); New Britain, CT
January 12, 2017; 7:00 pm		Fairleigh Dickinson	W 77–70	6–12 (4–1)	Knott Arena (1,253); Emmitsburg, MD
January 14, 2017; 4:00 pm		Saint Francis (PA)	W 78–72	7–12 (5–1)	Knott Arena (2,068); Emmitsburg, MD
January 19, 2017; 7:00 pm		at Sacred Heart	W 86–75	8–12 (6–1)	William H. Pitt Center; Fairfield, CT
January 21, 2017; 4:00 pm		at St. Francis Brooklyn	W 55–47	9–12 (7–1)	Generoso Pope Athletic Complex (672); Brooklyn, NY
January 26, 2017; 7:00 pm		Robert Morris	W 48–47	10–12 (8–1)	Knott Arena (2,780); Emmitsburg, MD
January 28, 2017; 4:00 pm		Sacred Heart	W 67–53	11–12 (9–1)	Knott Arena (3,028); Emmitsburg, MD
February 2, 2017; 7:00 pm		Bryant	W 77–70	12–12 (10–1)	Knott Arena (2,153); Emmitsburg, MD
February 4, 2017; 4:00 pm		Central Connecticut	L 52–54	12–13 (10–2)	Knott Arena (3,072); Emmitsburg, MD
February 9, 2017; 7:00 pm		at Robert Morris	W 74–70	13–13 (11–2)	Charles L. Sewall Center (1,111); Moon Township, PA
February 11, 2017; 1:00 pm		at Saint Francis (PA)	W 81–62	14–13 (12–2)	DeGol Arena (1,048); Loretto, PA
February 16, 2017; 7:00 pm, ESPN3		at Wagner	L 65–69	14–14 (12–3)	Spiro Sports Center (1,722); Staten Island, NY
February 18, 2017; 4:00 pm		at Fairleigh Dickinson	W 79–74	15–14 (13–3)	Rothman Center (1,306); Hackensack, NJ
February 23, 2017; 7:00 pm		LIU Brooklyn	L 58–62	15–15 (13–4)	Knott Arena (2,765); Emmitsburg, MD
February 25, 2017; 4:00 pm		St. Francis Brooklyn	W 77–62	16–15 (14–4)	Knott Arena (2,470); Emmitsburg, MD
NEC tournament
March 1, 2017; 7:00 pm	(1)	(8) Sacred Heart; Quarterfinals	W 76–73	17–15	Knott Arena (2,405); Emmitsburg, MD
March 4, 2017; 2:00 pm, FCS/MSG	(1)	(7) Robert Morris; Semifinals	W 75–66	18–15	Knott Arena (2,867); Emmitsburg, MD
March 7, 2017; 7:00 pm, ESPN2	(1)	(4) Saint Francis (PA); Championship	W 71–61	19–15	Knott Arena (3,121); Emmitsburg, MD
NCAA tournament
March 14, 2017*; 6:40 pm, truTV	(16 E)	vs. (16 E) New Orleans; First Four	W 67–66	20–15	UD Arena (11,855); Dayton, OH
March 16, 2017*; 7:10 pm, CBS	(16 E)	vs. (1 E) No. 1 Villanova; First Round	L 56–76	20–16	KeyBank Center (17,619); Buffalo, NY
*Non-conference game. ^{#}Rankings from AP Poll. (#) Tournament seedings in parentheses. E=East Region. All times are in Eastern Time. Source.
