= 2016–17 Fairleigh Dickinson Knights men's basketball team =

American college basketball season

2016–17 Fairleigh Dickinson Knights men's basketball
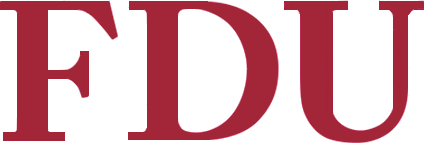
- Conference: Northeast Conference
- Record: 11–19 (9–9 NEC)
- Head coach: Greg Herenda (4th season)
- Associate head coach: Bruce Hamburger
- Assistant coaches: Dwayne Lee; Winston Smith
- Home arena: Rothman Center

2016–17 Northeast Conference men's basketball standings
	Conf.				Overall
Team	W		L	PCT	W		L	PCT
Mount St. Mary's †	14	–	4	.778	20	–	16	.556
LIU Brooklyn	13	–	5	.722	20	–	12	.625
Wagner	11	–	7	.611	16	–	14	.533
Saint Francis	11	–	7	.611	17	–	17	.500
Robert Morris	9	–	9	.500	14	–	19	.424
Bryant	9	–	9	.500	12	–	20	.375
Fairleigh Dickinson	9	–	9	.500	11	–	19	.367
Sacred Heart	8	–	10	.444	13	–	19	.406
Central Connecticut	4	–	14	.222	6	–	23	.207
St. Francis Brooklyn	2	–	16	.111	4	–	27	.129
† 2017 NEC tournament winner

The 2016–17 Fairleigh Dickinson Knights men's basketball team represented Fairleigh Dickinson University during the 2016–17 NCAA Division I men's basketball season. The team was led by fourth-year head coach Greg Herenda. The Knights played their home games at the Rothman Center in Hackensack, New Jersey as members of the Northeast Conference. They finished the season 11–19, 9–9 in NEC play to finish in three-way tie for fifth place. They lost in the quarterfinals of the NEC tournament to Wagner.

== Previous season ==
The Knights finished the 2015–16 season 18–15, 11–7 in NEC play to finish in a three-way tie for second place. They defeated Saint Francis (PA), Mount St. Mary's, and Wagner to win the NEC tournament and receive the conference's automatic bid to the NCAA tournament. As a No. 16 seed, they lost to Florida Gulf Coast in the First Four.

== Roster ==
2016–17 Fairleigh Dickinson Knights men's basketball team
Players
Coaches

Pos.	#	Name	Height	Weight	Year	Hometown
F	14	Tyrone O'Garro	6 ft 6 in (1.98 m)	210 lb (95 kg)	RS Sr	Newark, New Jersey
G	0	Stephan Jiggetts	6 ft 1 in (1.85 m)	205 lb (93 kg)	Jr	Forestville, Maryland
G	2	Darian Anderson	6 ft 1 in (1.85 m)	170 lb (77 kg)	Jr	Washington, D.C.
G	13	Mike Schroback	5 ft 10 in (1.78 m)	175 lb (79 kg)	Jr	Hasbrouck Heights, New Jersey
G	5	Earl Potts Jr.	6 ft 6 in (1.98 m)	200 lb (91 kg)	Jr	Severn, Maryland
F	24	Nadi Beciri	6 ft 7 in (2.01 m)	235 lb (107 kg)	So	Maywood, New Jersey
G	3	DaRon Curry	6 ft 0 in (1.83 m)	170 lb (77 kg)	So	Deptford, New Jersey
F	20	Dondre Rhoden	6 ft 6 in (1.98 m)	230 lb (104 kg)	So	Ridgefield Park, New Jersey
G	1	Darnell Edge	6 ft 1 in (1.85 m)	175 lb (79 kg)	So	Saugerties, New York
G	23	Ghassan Nehme	6 ft 3 in (1.91 m)	175 lb (79 kg)	So	Colorado Springs, Colorado
F	34	Mike Holloway	6 ft 7 in (2.01 m)	245 lb (111 kg)	So	Pittsgrove, New Jersey
C	35	Malik Miller	6 ft 9 in (2.06 m)	215 lb (98 kg)	So	Troy, New York
G	10	Pat McNamara	6 ft 5 in (1.96 m)	190 lb (86 kg)	So	Arlington Heights, Illinois
F	12	Kaleb Bishop	6 ft 8 in (2.03 m)	195 lb (88 kg)	Fr	Paterson, New Jersey

Head coach

- Greg Herenda (Merrimack)

Assistant coach(es)

- Bruce Hamburger
- Dwayne Lee

Legend

- (C) Team captain
- (S) Suspended
- (I) Ineligible
- (W) Walk-on
- Injured
- Current redshirt

Roster
Last update: 2015-10-13

== Schedule and results ==
Date time, TV	Rank^{#}	Opponent^{#}	Result	Record	Site (attendance) city, state
Exhibition
Nov 3, 2016*; 7:00 pm, FSN/YES		Merrimack	W 77–62		Rothman Center; Hackensack, NJ
Non-conference regular season
Nov 11, 2016*; 7:00 pm		at Seton Hall	L 70–91	0–1	Walsh Gymnasium (1,856); South Orange, NJ
Nov 15, 2016*; 7:00 pm		FDU-Florham	W 96–48	1–1	Rothman Center (943); Hackensack, NJ
Nov 18, 2016*; 6:00 pm		at Fordham; Fordham Showcase	L 55–68	1–2	Rose Hill Gymnasium (1,533); Bronx, NY
Nov 19, 2016*; 5:30 pm		vs. Lipscomb; Fordham Showcase	W 90–72	2–2	Rose Hill Gymnasium (1,473); Bronx, NY
Nov 20, 2016*; 1:00 pm		vs. Saint Peter's; Fordham Showcase	L 58–84	2–3	Rose Hill Gymnasium (1,003); Bronx, NY
Nov 30, 2016*; 7:00 pm		at Army	L 78–97	2–4	Christl Arena (446); West Point, NY
Dec 3, 2016*; 4:30 pm		at Ohio State	L 62–70	2–5	Value City Arena (11,570); Columbus, OH
Dec 7, 2016*; 7:00 pm		Iona	L 73–90	2–6	Rothman Center (1,257); Hackensack, NJ
Dec 10, 2016*; 2:00 pm		at Towson	L 87–90	2–7	SECU Arena (1,312); Towson, MD
Dec 14, 2016*; 7:00 pm		at Rutgers	L 69–82	2–8	Louis Brown Athletic Center (3,635); Piscataway, NJ
Dec 17, 2016*; 2:30 pm, ESPN3		at No. 25 Cincinnati	L 68–119	2–9	Fifth Third Arena (7,017); Cincinnati, OH
NEC regular season
Dec 29, 2016; 7:30 pm		Saint Francis (PA)	W 77–65	3–9 (1–0)	Rothman Center (914); Hackensack, NJ
Dec 31, 2016; 3:00 pm		Robert Morris	W 81–77	4–9 (2–0)	Rothman Center (1,006); Hackensack, NJ
Jan 5, 2017; 7:00 pm, CBSSN		at Wagner	W 70–69	5–9 (3–0)	Spiro Sports Center (1,458); Staten Island, NY
Jan 7, 2017; 3:00 pm		Bryant	W 87–84	6–9 (4–0)	Rothman Center (702); Hackensack, NJ
Jan 12, 2017; 7:00 pm		at Mount St. Mary's	L 70–77	6–10 (4–1)	Knott Arena (1,253); Emmitsburg, MD
Jan 14, 2017; 3:30 pm		at Central Connecticut	W 59–47	7–10 (5–1)	William H. Detrick Gymnasium (1,064); New Britain, CT
Jan 19, 2017; 7:00 pm		St. Francis Brooklyn	W 57–40	8–10 (6–1)	Rothman Center (697); Hackensack, NJ
Jan 21, 2017; 4:00 pm		LIU Brooklyn	W 83–66	9–10 (7–1)	Rothman Center (1,108); Hackensack, NJ
Jan 26, 2017; 7:00 pm		at St. Francis Brooklyn	W 79–73	10–10 (8–1)	Generoso Pope Athletic Complex (634); Brooklyn, NY
Jan 28, 2017; 4:00 pm		at Bryant	L 72–73	10–11 (8–2)	Chace Athletic Center (738); Smithfield, RI
Feb 2, 2017; 7:00 pm		Sacred Heart	L 70–74	10–12 (8–3)	Rothman Center (888); Hackensack, NJ
Feb 4, 2017; 11:00 am, ESPNU		Wagner	L 59–68	10–13 (8–4)	Rothman Center (1,723); Hackensack, NJ
Feb 9, 2017; 7:00 pm, ESPN3		Central Connecticut	W 79–62	11–13 (9–4)	Rothman Center (803); Hackensack, NJ
Feb 11, 2017; 4:30 pm		at LIU Brooklyn	L 69–75	11–14 (9–5)	Steinberg Wellness Center (794); Brooklyn, NY
Feb 16, 2017; 7:00 pm		at Sacred Heart	L 81–91	11–15 (9–6)	William H. Pitt Center (322); Fairfield, CT
Feb 18, 2017; 4:00 pm		Mount St. Mary's	L 74–79	11–16 (9–7)	Rothman Center (1,306); Hackensack, NJ
Feb 23, 2017; 7:00 pm		at Robert Morris	L 76–77	11–17 (9–8)	Charles L. Sewall Center (1,109); Moon Township, PA
Feb 25, 2017; 1:00 pm		at Saint Francis (PA)	L 64–70	11–18 (9–9)	DeGol Arena (814); Loretto, PA
NEC tournament
Mar 1, 2017; 7:00 pm, FCS/MSG+	(6)	at (3) Wagner; Quarterfinals	L 70–72	11–19	Spiro Sports Center (1,514); Staten Island, NY
*Non-conference game. ^{#}Rankings from AP Poll. (#) Tournament seedings in parentheses. All times are in Eastern Time Source.
