= 2016–17 Robert Morris Colonials men's basketball team =

American college basketball season

2016–17 Robert Morris Colonials men's basketball

Barclays Classic campus site bracket champions
- Conference: Northeast Conference
- Record: 14–19 (9–9 NEC)
- Head coach: Andrew Toole (7th season)
- Assistant coaches: Kyle Griffin; Robby Pridgen; Mike Iuzzolino
- Home arena: Charles L. Sewall Center; PPG Paints Arena

2016–17 Northeast Conference men's basketball standings
| | Conf. | | | | Overall |
| Team | W | | L | PCT | W | | L | PCT |
|---|---|---|---|---|---|---|---|---|
| Mount St. Mary's † | 14 | – | 4 | .778 | 20 | – | 16 | .556 |
| LIU Brooklyn | 13 | – | 5 | .722 | 20 | – | 12 | .625 |
| Wagner | 11 | – | 7 | .611 | 16 | – | 14 | .533 |
| Saint Francis | 11 | – | 7 | .611 | 17 | – | 17 | .500 |
| Robert Morris | 9 | – | 9 | .500 | 14 | – | 19 | .424 |
| Bryant | 9 | – | 9 | .500 | 12 | – | 20 | .375 |
| Fairleigh Dickinson | 9 | – | 9 | .500 | 11 | – | 19 | .367 |
| Sacred Heart | 8 | – | 10 | .444 | 13 | – | 19 | .406 |
| Central Connecticut | 4 | – | 14 | .222 | 6 | – | 23 | .207 |
| St. Francis Brooklyn | 2 | – | 16 | .111 | 4 | – | 27 | .129 |
† 2017 NEC tournament winner

The 2016–17 Robert Morris Colonials men's basketball team represented Robert Morris University during the 2016–17 NCAA Division I men's basketball season. The Colonials, led by seventh-year head coach Andrew Toole, played their home games at the Charles L. Sewall Center in Moon Township, Pennsylvania as members of the Northeast Conference. The Colonials also hosted two home games at PPG Paints Arena. They finished the season 14–19, 9–9 in NEC play to finish in a three-way tie for fifth place. After tiebreakers, they received the 7 seed in the NEC tournament where they defeated LIU Brooklyn in the quarterfinals to advance to the semifinals where they lost to Mount St. Mary's.

== Previous season ==
The Colonials finished the 2015–16 season 10–22, 8–10 in NEC play to finish in eighth place. They lost in the quarterfinals of the NEC tournament to Wagner.

== Roster ==
2016–17 Robert Morris Colonials men's basketball team
Players
Coaches

| Pos. | # | Name | Height | Weight | Year | Hometown |
|---|---|---|---|---|---|---|
| G | 0 | Jordan Lester | 6 ft 2 in (1.88 m) | 195 lb (88 kg) | So | Sammamish, Washington |
| G | 1 | Isaiah Still | 6 ft 6 in (1.98 m) | 190 lb (86 kg) | So | Rahway, New Jersey |
| F | 2 | David Cole | 6 ft 7 in (2.01 m) | 230 lb (104 kg) | Fr | Corona, New York |
| G | 3 | Kavon Stewart | 6 ft 0 in (1.83 m) | 190 lb (86 kg) | Sr | Paterson, New Jersey |
| G | 4 | Clive Allen | 6 ft 0 in (1.83 m) | 180 lb (82 kg) | Fr | Bronx, New York |
| F/C | 5 | Braden Burke | 6 ft 11 in (2.11 m) | 220 lb (100 kg) | Fr | Stevensville, Michigan |
| G | 11 | Dachon Burke | 6 ft 4 in (1.93 m) | 180 lb (82 kg) | Fr | Orange, New Jersey |
| F | 13 | Seth Rouse | 6 ft 3 in (1.91 m) | 205 lb (93 kg) | So | Pittsburgh, Pennsylvania |
| F | 20 | Billy Giles | 6 ft 7 in (2.01 m) | 200 lb (91 kg) | Sr | Richmond, Virginia |
| G | 23 | Matty McConnell | 6 ft 2 in (1.88 m) | 195 lb (88 kg) | So | Oakdale, Pennsylvania |
| F | 24 | Aaron Tate | 6 ft 5 in (1.96 m) | 230 lb (104 kg) | RS Sr | Cove City, North Carolina |
| F | 25 | Conrad Stephens | 6 ft 4 in (1.93 m) | 190 lb (86 kg) | Sr | Columbus, Ohio |
| F | 32 | Roberto Mantovani | 6 ft 8 in (2.03 m) | 235 lb (107 kg) | Jr | Larnaca, Cyprus |
| G | 42 | Lorenzen Wright, Jr. | 6 ft 3 in (1.91 m) | 190 lb (86 kg) | Jr | Memphis, Tennessee |

Head coach

- Andrew Toole (Pennsylvania)

Assistant coach(es)

- Kyle Griffin (Siena)
- Robby Pridgen (Roanoke)
- Mike Iuzzolino (Saint Francis (PA))

Legend

- (C) Team captain
- (S) Suspended
- (I) Ineligible
- (W) Walk-on
- Injured
- Current redshirt

Roster

== Schedule and results ==
| Date time, TV | Rank^{#} | Opponent^{#} | Result | Record | Site (attendance) city, state |
Non-conference regular season
| Nov 11, 2016*; 7:00 pm | | Penn | L 50–67 | 0–1 | Charles L. Sewall Center (1,691); Moon Township, PA |
| Nov 13, 2016*; 7:00 pm | | at DePaul | L 72–78 | 0–2 | McGrath–Phillips Arena (2,330); Chicago, IL |
| Nov 16, 2016*; 7:00 pm | | at Bucknell | L 62–75 | 0–3 | Sojka Pavilion (2,205); Lewisburg, PA |
| Nov 20, 2016*; 1:30 pm, CSNMA+ | | at Richmond; Barclays Center Classic | L 69–81 | 0–4 | Robins Center (4,768); Richmond, VA |
| Nov 22, 2016*; 8:00 pm, FSKC | | at Kansas State; Barclays Center Classic | L 40–61 | 0–5 | Bramlage Coliseum (11,010); Manhattan, KS |
| Nov 25, 2016*; 7:30 pm | | vs. Hampton; Barclays Center Classic semifinal | W 62–48 | 1–5 | SECU Arena (250); Towson, MD |
| Nov 26, 2016*; 7:30 pm | | at Towson; Barclays Center Classic final | W 67–66 | 2–5 | SECU Arena (1,211); Towson, MD |
| Nov 30, 2016*; 7:00 pm | | Youngstown State | L 74–75 | 2–6 | Charles L. Sewall Center (792); Moon Township, PA |
| Dec 3, 2016*; 2:00 pm | | at Lehigh | L 58–64 | 2–7 | Stabler Arena (1,003); Bethlehem, PA |
| Dec 6, 2016*; 7:00 pm | | Duquesne | W 64–60 | 3–7 | PPG Paints Arena (1,819); Pittsburgh, PA |
| Dec 10, 2016*; 4:00 pm | | Oakland | L 53–74 | 3–8 | Charles L. Sewall Center (638); Moon Township, PA |
| Dec 17, 2016*; 4:30 pm | | at No. 13 Virginia | W 79–39 | 3–9 | John Paul Jones Arena (13,452); Charlottesville, VA |
| Dec 21, 2016*; 7:00 pm | | Buffalo | W 74–71 | 4–9 | PPG Paints Arena (506); Pittsburgh, PA |
NEC regular season
| Dec 29, 2016; 3:30 pm | | at Sacred Heart | W 78–67 | 5–9 (1–0) | William H. Pitt Center (242); Fairfield, CT |
| Dec 31, 2016; 3:00 pm | | at Fairleigh Dickinson | L 77–81 | 5–10 (1–1) | Rothman Center (1,006); Teaneck, NJ |
| Jan 5, 2017; 7:00 pm | | LIU Brooklyn | L 54–65 | 5–11 (1–2) | Charles L. Sewall Center (427); Moon Township, PA |
| Jan 7, 2017; 4:00 pm | | St. Francis Brooklyn | W 62–58 | 6–11 (2–2) | Charles L. Sewall Center (843); Moon Township, PA |
| Jan 12, 2017; 7:00 pm | | Saint Francis (PA) | L 57–77 | 6–12 (2–3) | Charles L. Sewall Center (812); Moon Township, PA |
| Jan 14, 2017; 4:00 pm | | at Wagner | L 50–53 | 6–13 (2–4) | Spiro Sports Center (1,203); Staten Island, NY |
| Jan 19, 2017; 7:00 pm | | Central Connecticut | W 74–67 | 7–13 (3–4) | Charles L. Sewall Center (964); Moon Township, PA |
| Jan 21, 2017; 4:00 pm | | Bryant | L 56–59 | 7–14 (3–5) | Charles L. Sewall Center (1,047); Moon Township, PA |
| Jan 26, 2017; 7:00 pm, CBSSN | | at Mount St. Mary's | L 47–48 | 7–15 (3–6) | Knott Arena (2,780); Emmitsburg, MD |
| Jan 28, 2017; 7:00 pm | | at Saint Francis (PA) | L 83–89 ^{OT} | 7–16 (3–7) | DeGol Arena (1,510); Loretto, PA |
| Feb 2, 2017; 7:00 pm | | at LIU Brooklyn | W 67–63 | 8–16 (4–7) | Steinberg Wellness Center (687); Brooklyn, NY |
| Feb 4, 2017; 4:00 pm | | at St. Francis Brooklyn | W 78–54 | 9–16 (5–7) | Generoso Pope Athletic Complex (648); Brooklyn, NY |
| Feb 9, 2017; 7:00 pm | | Mount St. Mary's | L 70–74 | 9–17 (5–8) | Charles L. Sewall Center (1,111); Moon Township, PA |
| Feb 11, 2017; 4:00 pm | | Wagner | W 50–48 | 10–17 (6–8) | Charles L. Sewall Center (1,096); Moon Township, PA |
| Feb 16, 2017; 7:00 pm | | at Bryant | L 73–81 | 10–18 (6–9) | Chace Athletic Center (650); Smithfield, RI |
| Feb 18, 2017; 4:00 pm | | at Central Connecticut | W 74–64 | 11–18 (7–9) | William H. Detrick Gymnasium (1,564); New Britain, CT |
| Feb 23, 2017; 7:00 pm | | Fairleigh Dickinson | W 77–76 | 12-18 (8-9) | Charles L. Sewall Center (1,109); Moon Township, PA |
| Feb 25, 2017; 3:00 pm, ESPN3 | | Sacred Heart | W 79–72 | 13–18 (9–9) | Charles L. Sewall Center (2,153); Moon Township, PA |
NEC tournament
| Mar 1, 2017; 9:00 pm, FCS/MSG+ | (7) | at (2) LIU Brooklyn; Quarterfinals | W 69–68 | 14–18 | Steinberg Wellness Center (1,422); Brooklyn, NY |
| Mar 4, 2017; 2:00 pm, FCS/MSG | (7) | at (1) Mount St. Mary's; Semifinals | L 66–75 | 14–19 | Knott Arena (2,867); Emmitsburg, MD |
*Non-conference game. ^{#}Rankings from AP Poll. (#) Tournament seedings in parentheses. All times are in Eastern Time Source.
