= 2016–17 Sacred Heart Pioneers men's basketball team =

American college basketball season

2016–17 Sacred Heart Pioneers men's basketball
- Conference: Northeast Conference
- Record: 13–19 (8–10 NEC)
- Head coach: Anthony Latina (4th season)
- Assistant coaches: Johnny Kidd; Kevin Papacs; Kyle Steinway
- Home arena: William H. Pitt Center

2016–17 Northeast Conference men's basketball standings
	Conf.				Overall
Team	W		L	PCT	W		L	PCT
Mount St. Mary's †	14	–	4	.778	20	–	16	.556
LIU Brooklyn	13	–	5	.722	20	–	12	.625
Wagner	11	–	7	.611	16	–	14	.533
Saint Francis	11	–	7	.611	17	–	17	.500
Robert Morris	9	–	9	.500	14	–	19	.424
Bryant	9	–	9	.500	12	–	20	.375
Fairleigh Dickinson	9	–	9	.500	11	–	19	.367
Sacred Heart	8	–	10	.444	13	–	19	.406
Central Connecticut	4	–	14	.222	6	–	23	.207
St. Francis Brooklyn	2	–	16	.111	4	–	27	.129
† 2017 NEC tournament winner

The 2016–17 Sacred Heart Pioneers men's basketball team represented Sacred Heart University during the 2016–17 NCAA Division I men's basketball season. This was the Pioneers' 18th season of NCAA Division I basketball, all played in the Northeast Conference. The Pioneers were led by fourth-year head coach Anthony Latina and played their home games at the William H. Pitt Center in Fairfield, Connecticut. They finished the season 13–19, 8–10 in NEC play to finish in eighth place. They lost in the quarterfinals of the NEC tournament to Mount St. Mary's.

== Previous season ==
The Pioneers finished the 2015–16 season 12–18, 11–7 in NEC play to finish in a three was tie for second place. They lost in the quarterfinals of the NEC tournament to LIU Brooklyn.

== Roster ==
2016–17 Sacred Heart Pioneers men's basketball team
Players
Coaches

Pos.	#	Name	Height	Weight	Year	Hometown
G	2	Zach Radz	6 ft 2 in (1.88 m)	185 lb (84 kg)	Fr	Watervliet, New York
C	3	Cole Walton	6 ft 11 in (2.11 m)	240 lb (109 kg)	RS Sr	Bellevue, Washington
F	5	De'von Barnett	6 ft 5 in (1.96 m)	195 lb (88 kg)	RS Jr	Waldorf, Maryland
G	10	Charles Tucker Jr.	6 ft 1 in (1.85 m)	188 lb (85 kg)	Jr	Lansing, Michigan
G	11	Quincy McKnight	6 ft 3 in (1.91 m)	180 lb (82 kg)	So	Bridgeport, Connecticut
G/F	12	Shawn Montague	6 ft 5 in (1.96 m)	182 lb (83 kg)	Fr	Yorktown Heights, New York
F	13	Cavan LaRose	6 ft 3 in (1.91 m)	185 lb (84 kg)	Sr	Ogdensburg, New York
G	14	Chris Robinson	6 ft 3 in (1.91 m)	165 lb (75 kg)	Jr	Bronx, New York
F	21	Joseph Lopez	6 ft 7 in (2.01 m)	220 lb (100 kg)	Jr	Miami, Florida
G	22	Sean Hoehn	6 ft 2 in (1.88 m)	182 lb (83 kg)	So	Morristown, New Jersey
G	30	Kinnon LaRose	6 ft 3 in (1.91 m)	185 lb (84 kg)	So	Ogdensburg, New York
F	31	Mario Matasovic	6 ft 8 in (2.03 m)	215 lb (98 kg)	RS Jr	Gornja Vrba, Croatia
G	32	Travis Berry	6 ft 4 in (1.93 m)	188 lb (85 kg)	Sr	Elmont, New York
F	44	Matej Buovac	6 ft 7 in (2.01 m)	210 lb (95 kg)	RS Sr	Zagreb, Croatia

Head coach

- Anthony Latina (Brandeis)

Assistant coach(es)

- Johnny Kidd (Central Connecticut State)
- Kevin Papacs (Central Connecticut State)
- Kyle Steinway (Providence)

Legend

- (C) Team captain
- (S) Suspended
- (I) Ineligible
- (W) Walk-on
- Injured
- Current redshirt

Roster

== Schedule and results ==
Date time, TV	Rank^{#}	Opponent^{#}	Result	Record	Site (attendance) city, state
Non-conference regular season
Nov 15, 2016*; 7:00 pm		at Fairfield	L 63–85	0–1	Webster Bank Arena (3,043); Bridgeport, CT
Nov 15, 2016*; 7:00 pm		Hofstra	W 90–86	1–1	William H. Pitt Center (579); Fairfield, CT
Nov 18, 2016*; 10:00 pm		at No. 10 Arizona; Las Vegas Invitational	L 65–95	1–2	McKale Center (14,392); Tucson, AZ
Nov 21, 2016*; 10:00 pm		at Santa Clara; Las Vegas Invitational	L 74–84	1–3	Leavey Center (1,112); Santa Clara, CA
Nov 24, 2016*; 5:00 pm		vs. Northern Colorado; Las Vegas Invitational	L 59–81	1–4	Orleans Arena; Paradise, NV
Nov 25, 2016*; 2:30 pm		vs. Norfolk State; Las Vegas Invitational Consolation	W 61–59	2–4	Orleans Arena; Paradise, NV
Nov 30, 2016*; 7:00 pm		at Fordham	W 71–70	3–4	Rose Hill Gymnasium (1,002); Bronx, NY
Dec 3, 2016*; 1:00 pm		Hartford	L 79–87	3–5	William H. Pitt Center (303); Fairfield, CT
Dec 6, 2016*; 7:00 pm		UMass Lowell	W 91–82	4–5	William H. Pitt Center; Fairfield, CT
Dec 8, 2016*; 8:00 pm		Yale	L 52–66	4–6	William H. Pitt Center (468); Fairfield, CT
Dec 11, 2016*; 2:00 pm		at Lafayette	W 85–61	5–6	Kirby Sports Center (1,546); Easton, PA
Dec 18, 2016*; 1:00 pm, ACCN Extra		at Boston College	L 75–82	5–7	Conte Forum; Chestnut Hill, MA
Dec 21, 2016*; 7:00 pm		Holy Cross	L 67–72	5–8	William H. Pitt Center (262); Fairfield, CT
NEC Regular season
Dec 29, 2016; 3:30 pm		Robert Morris	L 67–78	5–9 (0–1)	William H. Pitt Center (242); Fairfield, CT
Dec 31, 2016; 3:30 pm		Saint Francis (PA)	L 67–87	5–10 (0–2)	William H. Pitt Center (275); Fairfield, CT
Jan 5, 2017; 7:00 pm		at Central Connecticut	W 64–62	6–10 (1–2)	William H. Detrick Gymnasium; New Britain, CT
Jan 7, 2017; 4:00 pm		at Wagner	L 64–75	6–11 (1–3)	Spiro Sports Center (335); Staten Island, NY
Jan 12, 2017; 7:00 pm		at St. Francis Brooklyn	W 87–75	7–11 (2–3)	Generoso Pope Athletic Complex (373); Brooklyn, NY
Jan 14, 2017; 4:00 pm		at Bryant	W 112–110 ^{3OT}	8–11 (3–3)	Chace Athletic Center (508); Smithfield, RI
Jan 19, 2017; 7:00 pm		Mount St. Mary's	L 75–86	8–12 (3–4)	William H. Pitt Center; Fairfield, CT
Jan 21, 2017; 3:30 pm		Wagner	L 62–67	8–13 (3–5)	William H. Pitt Center (978); Fairfield, CT
Jan 26, 2017; 7:00 pm		LIU Brooklyn	L 57–60	8–14 (3–6)	William H. Pitt Center; Fairfield, CT
Jan 28, 2017; 4:00 pm		at Mount St. Mary's	L 53–67	8–15 (3–7)	Knott Arena (3,028); Emmitsburg, MD
Feb 2, 2017; 7:00 pm		at Fairleigh Dickinson	W 74–70	9–15 (4–7)	Rothman Center (888); Hackensack, NJ
Feb 4, 2017; 3:30 pm		Bryant	W 73–70 ^{OT}	10–15 (5–7)	William H. Pitt Center (536); Fairfield, CT
Feb 9, 2017; 9:00 pm		St. Francis Brooklyn	W 80–65	11–15 (6–7)	William H. Pitt Center (1,236); Fairfield, CT
Feb 11, 2017; 3:30 pm		Central Connecticut	W 77–62	12–15 (7–7)	William H. Pitt Center (603); Fairfield, CT
Feb 16, 2017; 7:00 pm		Fairfield Dickinson	W 91–81	13–15 (8–7)	William H. Pitt Center (322); Fairfield, CT
Feb 18, 2017; 12:00 pm		at LIU Brooklyn	L 82–83	13–16 (8–8)	Steinberg Wellness Center (752); Brooklyn, NY
Feb 23, 2017; 7:00 pm		at Saint Francis (PA)	L 64–74	13–17 (8–9)	DeGol Arena (778); Loretto, PA
Feb 25, 2017; 4:00 pm		at Robert Morris	L 72–79	13–18 (8–10)	Charles L. Sewall Center (2,153); Moon Township, PA
NEC tournament
Mar 1, 2017; 7:00 pm	(8)	at (1) Mount St. Mary's; Quarterfinals	L 73–76	13–19	Knott Arena (2,405); Emmitsburg, MD
*Non-conference game. ^{#}Rankings from AP Poll. (#) Tournament seedings in parentheses. All times are in Eastern Time..
