= 2016–17 Central Connecticut Blue Devils men's basketball team =

American college basketball season

2016–17 Central Connecticut Blue Devils men's basketball
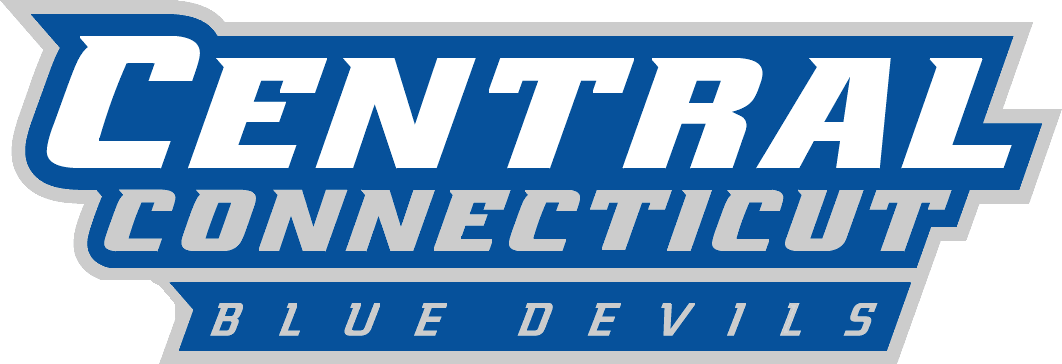
- Conference: Northeast Conference
- Record: 6–23 (4–14 NEC)
- Head coach: Donyell Marshall (1st season)
- Assistant coaches: Mike Witcoskie; Anthony Anderson; Obie Nwadike
- Home arena: William H. Detrick Gymnasium

2016–17 Northeast Conference men's basketball standings
	Conf.				Overall
Team	W		L	PCT	W		L	PCT
Mount St. Mary's †	14	–	4	.778	20	–	16	.556
LIU Brooklyn	13	–	5	.722	20	–	12	.625
Wagner	11	–	7	.611	16	–	14	.533
Saint Francis	11	–	7	.611	17	–	17	.500
Robert Morris	9	–	9	.500	14	–	19	.424
Bryant	9	–	9	.500	12	–	20	.375
Fairleigh Dickinson	9	–	9	.500	11	–	19	.367
Sacred Heart	8	–	10	.444	13	–	19	.406
Central Connecticut	4	–	14	.222	6	–	23	.207
St. Francis Brooklyn	2	–	16	.111	4	–	27	.129
† 2017 NEC tournament winner

The 2016–17 Central Connecticut Blue Devils men's basketball team represented Central Connecticut State University during the 2016–17 NCAA Division I men's basketball season. The Blue Devils, led by first-year head coach Donyell Marshall, played their home games at the William H. Detrick Gymnasium in New Britain, Connecticut as members of the Northeast Conference. They finished the season 6–23, 4–14 in NEC play to finish in ninth place. They failed to qualify for the NEC tournament.

== Previous season ==
The Blue Devils finished the 2015–16 season 4–25, 3–15 in NEC play to finish in last place. They failed to qualify for the NEC tournament.

On April 6, 2016, the school announced Donyell Marshall as the 10th head coach in program history. Marshall replaced Howie Dickenman, who retired after 20 years at Central Connecticut.

== Roster ==
2016–17 Central Connecticut Blue Devils men's basketball team
Players
Coaches

Pos.	#	Name	Height	Weight	Year	Hometown
F/C	0	Harrison Kay	6 ft 11 in (2.11 m)	240 lb (109 kg)	Fr	Covina Hills, California
G	1	Kevin Seymour	6 ft 0 in (1.83 m)	175 lb (79 kg)	Jr	Bronx, New York
F	2	Kashaun Hicks (redshirt)	6 ft 6 in (1.98 m)	195 lb (88 kg)	Fr	Jersey City, New Jersey
F	3	Mustafa Jones	6 ft 7 in (2.01 m)	180 lb (82 kg)	Jr	Harlem, New York
G	5	Eric Bowles	6 ft 0 in (1.83 m)	180 lb (82 kg)	So	Fairfax, Virginia
G	10	Austin Nehls	6 ft 3 in (1.91 m)	185 lb (84 kg)	So	Tucson, Arizona
F	11	Tidell Pierre	6 ft 7 in (2.01 m)	210 lb (95 kg)	Sr	Hempstead, New York
G	12	Khalen Cumberlander	6 ft 3 in (1.91 m)	185 lb (84 kg)	Sr	Washington, D.C.
G	13	Tyson Batiste	6 ft 2 in (1.88 m)	170 lb (77 kg)	Fr	Springfield, Missouri
G	15	Shakaris Laney	6 ft 4 in (1.93 m)	200 lb (91 kg)	Jr	Philadelphia, Pennsylvania
F	20	Tafari Whittingham	6 ft 8 in (2.03 m)	215 lb (98 kg)	Sr	Brooklyn, New York
G	21	Antwann Anderson	5 ft 9 in (1.75 m)	175 lb (79 kg)	Fr	Slidell, Louisiana
G/F	24	Chris Williams	6 ft 6 in (1.98 m)	170 lb (77 kg)	Fr	Chicago, Illinois
F	30	Donyell Marshall, Jr.	6 ft 6 in (1.98 m)	175 lb (79 kg)	Fr	Pepper Pike, Ohio

Head coach

- Donyell Marshall (Connecticut)

Assistant coach(es)

- Anthony Anderson (McNeese State)
- Mike Witcoskie (Susquehanna)
- Anthony Ross (East Stroudsburg)

Legend

- (C) Team captain
- (S) Suspended
- (I) Ineligible
- (W) Walk-on
- Injured
- Current redshirt

Roster

== Schedule and results ==
Date time, TV	Opponent	Result	Record	Site (attendance) city, state
Exhibition
Nov 4, 2016*; 7:00 pm	Alvernia	W 78–71		William H. Detrick Gymnasium; New Britain, CT
Non-conference regular season
Nov 11, 2016*; 7:00 pm	Hartford; Rivalry	W 75–60	1–0	William H. Detrick Gymnasium (2,317); New Britain, CT
Nov 13, 2016*; 2:00 pm	at Seton Hall	L 58–82	1–1	Prudential Center (6,354); Newark, NJ
Nov 16, 2016*; 7:00 pm	at Binghamton	L 70–72	1–2	Binghamton University Events Center (1,601); Vestal, NY
Nov 22, 2016*; 7:00 pm	Penn	L 65–87	1–3	William H. Detrick Gymnasium (1,164); New Britain, CT
Nov 30, 2016*; 7:00 pm	at Maine	W 82–61	2–3	Cross Insurance Center (836); Bangor, ME
Dec 3, 2016*; 1:00 pm	Brown	L 58–75	2–4	William H. Detrick Gymnasium (1,748); New Britain, CT
Dec 6, 2016*; 7:00 pm	at Rutgers	L 37–79	2–5	Louis Brown Athletic Center (3,811); Piscataway, NJ
Dec 10, 2016*; 2:00 pm	at Duquesne	L 67–70	2–6	Palumbo Center (890); Pittsburgh, PA
Dec 13, 2016*; 7:00 pm	at Yale	L 59–90	2–7	Payne Whitney Gymnasium (756); New Haven, CT
Dec 18, 2016*; 1:00 pm	at UMass Lowell	L 69–86	2–8	Tsongas Center (319); Lowell, MA
Dec 21, 2016*; 7:00 pm	at Fordham	L 60–83	2–9	Rose Hill Gymnasium (954); Bronx, NY
NEC regular season
Dec 29, 2016; 7:00 pm	at Wagner	L 46–71	2–10 (0–1)	Spiro Sports Center (1,333); Staten Island, NY
Dec 31, 2016; 4:00 pm	at St. Francis Brooklyn	L 77–86 ^{OT}	2–11 (0–2)	Generoso Pope Athletic Complex (412); Brooklyn, NY
Jan 5, 2017; 7:00 pm	Sacred Heart	L 62–64	2–12 (0–3)	William H. Detrick Gymnasium; New Britain, CT
Jan 7, 2017; 3:30 pm	Mount St. Mary's	L 68–77	2–13 (0–4)	William H. Detrick Gymnasium (457); New Britain, CT
Jan 12, 2017; 7:00 pm	at LIU Brooklyn	L 49–60	2–14 (0–5)	Steinberg Wellness Center (520); Brooklyn, NY
Jan 14, 2017; 3:30 pm	Fairleigh Dickinson	L 47–59	2–15 (0–6)	William H. Detrick Gymnasium (1,064); New Britain, CT
Jan 19, 2017; 7:00 pm	at Robert Morris	L 67–74	2–16 (0–7)	Charles L. Sewall Center (964); Moon Township, PA
Jan 21, 2017; 3:30 pm	at Saint Francis (PA)	W 84–83 ^{OT}	3–16 (1–7)	DeGol Arena (978); Loretto, PA
Jan 25, 2017; 7:00 pm	Bryant	L 54–65	3–17 (1–8)	William H. Detrick Gymnasium (1,417); New Britain, CT
Jan 28, 2017; 3:30 pm	LIU Brooklyn	W 61–52	4–17 (2–8)	William H. Detrick Gymnasium (1,649); New Britain, CT
Feb 2, 2017; 7:00 pm	Wagner	L 60–70	4–18 (2–9)	William H. Detrick Gymnasium (1,417); New Britain, CT
Feb 4, 2017; 4:00 pm	at Mount St. Mary's	W 54–52	5–18 (3–9)	Knott Arena (3,072); Emmitsburg, MD
Feb 9, 2017; 5:00 pm, ESPN3	at Fairleigh Dickinson	L 62–79	5–19 (3–10)	Rothman Center (803); Hackensack, NJ
Feb 11, 2017; 3:30 pm	at Sacred Heart	L 62–77	5–20 (3–11)	William H. Pitt Center (603); Fairfield, CT
Feb 16, 2017; 7:00 pm	Saint Francis (PA)	L 71–80	5–21 (3–12)	William H. Detrick Gymnasium (1,009); New Britain, CT
Feb 18, 2017; 3:00 pm	Robert Morris	L 64–74	5–22 (3–13)	William H. Detrick Gymnasium (1,564); New Britain, CT
Feb 23, 2017; 7:00 pm	St. Francis Brooklyn	W 62–53	6–22 (4–13)	William H. Detrick Gymnasium (1,516); New Britain, CT
Feb 25, 2017; 1:00 pm	at Bryant	L 77–91	6–23 (4–14)	Chace Athletic Center (659); Smithfield, RI
*Non-conference game. ^{#}Rankings from AP Poll. (#) Tournament seedings in parentheses. All times are in Eastern Time.
