= 2016–17 Wagner Seahawks men's basketball team =

American college basketball season

2016–17 Wagner Seahawks men's basketball
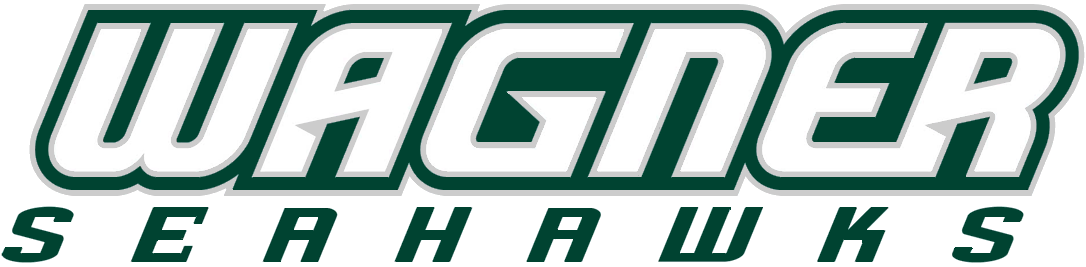
- Conference: Northeast Conference
- Record: 16–14 (11–7 NEC)
- Head coach: Bashir Mason (5th season)
- Associate head coach: Mike Babul
- Assistant coaches: Marquis Webb; Scott Smith
- Home arena: Spiro Sports Center

2016–17 Northeast Conference men's basketball standings
	Conf.				Overall
Team	W		L	PCT	W		L	PCT
Mount St. Mary's †	14	–	4	.778	20	–	16	.556
LIU Brooklyn	13	–	5	.722	20	–	12	.625
Wagner	11	–	7	.611	16	–	14	.533
Saint Francis	11	–	7	.611	17	–	17	.500
Robert Morris	9	–	9	.500	14	–	19	.424
Bryant	9	–	9	.500	12	–	20	.375
Fairleigh Dickinson	9	–	9	.500	11	–	19	.367
Sacred Heart	8	–	10	.444	13	–	19	.406
Central Connecticut	4	–	14	.222	6	–	23	.207
St. Francis Brooklyn	2	–	16	.111	4	–	27	.129
† 2017 NEC tournament winner

The 2016–17 Wagner Seahawks men's basketball team represented Wagner College during the 2016–17 NCAA Division I men's basketball season. The Seahawks were led by fifth-year head coach Bashir Mason. They played their home games at Spiro Sports Center on the school's Staten Island campus and were members of the Northeast Conference. They finished the season 16–14, 11–7 in NEC play to finish in a tie for third place. In the NEC tournament, they beat Fairleigh Dickinson before losing to Saint Francis (PA) in the semifinals.

== Previous season ==
The Seahawks finished the 2015–16 season 23–11, 13–5 in NEC play to win the regular season championship. They defeated Robert Morris and LIU Brooklyn to advance to the championship game of the NEC tournament where they lost to Fairleigh Dickinson. As a regular season conference champion who failed to win their conference tournament, they received an automatic bid to the National Invitation Tournament where they defeated St. Bonaventure in the first round before losing in the second round to Creighton.

== Roster ==
2016–17 Wagner Seahawks men's basketball team
Players
Coaches

Pos.	#	Name	Height	Weight	Year	Hometown
G	0	Corey Henson	6 ft 3 in (1.91 m)	175 lb (79 kg)	Jr	Upper Marlboro, Maryland
F	1	Shack Scott	6 ft 7 in (2.01 m)	215 lb (98 kg)	Jr	Paterson, New Jersey
G	2	Connor Ferrell	6 ft 4 in (1.93 m)	195 lb (88 kg)	Fr	Conyers, Georgia
G	3	Blake Francis	6 ft 0 in (1.83 m)	165 lb (75 kg)	Fr	Herndon, Virginia
F	4	AJ Sumbry	6 ft 8 in (2.03 m)	230 lb (104 kg)	RS So	East Windsor, New Jersey
G	5	JoJo Cooper	6 ft 0 in (1.83 m)	190 lb (86 kg)	Jr	Wilmington, Delaware
F	10	Marquis Salmon	6 ft 8 in (2.03 m)	210 lb (95 kg)	RS Jr	Lancaster, California
G	11	Romone Saunders	6 ft 3 in (1.91 m)	200 lb (91 kg)	Jr	Temple Hills, Maryland
F	15	Jamar Brown	6 ft 8 in (2.03 m)	250 lb (113 kg)	Fr	Harlem, New York
G/F	21	Elijah Davis	6 ft 4 in (1.93 m)	215 lb (98 kg)	So	Bronx, New York
G	23	Michael Carey	6 ft 5 in (1.96 m)	210 lb (95 kg)	Sr	Nassau, Bahamas
G	24	Devin Liggeons	6 ft 3 in (1.91 m)	190 lb (86 kg)	So	Philadelphia, Pennsylvania
F	34	Mike Aaman	6 ft 8 in (2.03 m)	260 lb (118 kg)	RS Sr	Hazlet, New Jersey
F	35	Greg Senat	6 ft 8 in (2.03 m)	245 lb (111 kg)	Sr	Elmont, New York

Head coach

- Bashir Mason (Drexel)

Assistant coach(es)

- Mike Babul (Massachusetts)
- Marquis Webb (Rutgers)
- Scott Smith (Seton Hall)

Legend

- (C) Team captain
- (S) Suspended
- (I) Ineligible
- (W) Walk-on
- Injured
- Current redshirt

Roster

== Schedule and results ==
Date time, TV	Rank^{#}	Opponent^{#}	Result	Record	Site (attendance) city, state
Non-conference regular season
Nov 11, 2016*; 7:00 pm, SNY		at No. 18 UConn	W 67–58	1–0	Harry A. Gampel Pavilion (9,523); Storrs, CT
Nov 14, 2016*; 7:00 pm		at UMass Lowell	L 76–87	1–1	Costello Athletic Center (1,053); Lowell, MA
Nov 19, 2016*; 4:00 pm		Fairfield	L 64–70 ^{OT}	1–2	Spiro Sports Center (1,635); Staten Island, NY
Nov 22, 2016*; 7:30 pm		at American	W 73–65	2–2	Bender Arena (488); Washington, D.C.
Nov 26, 2016*; 4:00 pm		Rider	L 67–70	2–3	Spiro Sports Center (1,001); Staten Island, NY
Nov 30, 2016*; 7:00 pm		at UMass	L 55–62	2–4	Mullins Center (2,896); Amherst, MA
Dec 6, 2016*; 7:00 pm		Monmouth	L 71–81	2–5	Spiro Sports Center (1,302); Staten Island, NY
Dec 10, 2016*; 1:00 pm		at Morgan State	W 68–66	3–5	Talmadge L. Hill Field House (1,007); Baltimore, MD
Dec 17, 2016*; 12:00 pm		at Providence	L 54–76	3–6	Dunkin' Donuts Center (4,069); Providence, RI
Dec 22, 2016*; 7:00 pm		Staten Island	W 94–42	4–6	Spiro Sports Center (1,359); Staten Island, NY
NEC regular season
Dec 29, 2016; 7:00 pm		Central Connecticut	W 71–46	5–6 (1–0)	Spiro Sports Center (1,333); Staten Island, NY
Dec 31, 2016; 2:00 pm		at Mount St. Mary's	L 56–57	5–7 (1–1)	Knott Arena (1,707); Emmitsburg, MD
Jan 5, 2017; 7:00 pm, CBSSN		Fairleigh Dickinson	L 69–70	5–8 (1–2)	Spiro Sports Center (1,458); Staten Island, NY
Jan 7, 2017; 4:00 pm		at Sacred Heart	W 75–64	6–8 (2–2)	Spiro Sports Center (335); Staten Island, NY
Jan 12, 2017; 12:00 pm		at Bryant	L 66–77	6–9 (2–3)	Chace Athletic Center (429); Smithfield, RI
Jan 14, 2017; 4:00 pm		Robert Morris	W 53–50	7–9 (3–3)	Spiro Sports Center (1,203); Staten Island, NY
Jan 19, 2017; 7:00 pm		at LIU Brooklyn	L 69–76	7–10 (3–4)	Steinberg Wellness Center (732); Brooklyn, NY
Jan 21, 2017; 3:30 pm		at Sacred Heart	W 67–62	8–10 (4–4)	William H. Pitt Center (978); Fairfield, CT
Jan 26, 2017; 7:00 pm		Saint Francis (PA)	L 67–72	8–11 (4–5)	Spiro Sports Center (1,601); Staten Island, NY
Jan 28, 2017; 4:00 pm		St. Francis Brooklyn	W 66–64	9–11 (5–5)	Spiro Sports Center (1,622); Staten Island, NY
February 2, 2017; 7:00 pm		at Central Connecticut	W 70–60	10–11 (6–5)	William H. Detrick Gymnasium (1,417); New Britain, CT
Feb 4, 2017; 11:00 am, ESPNU		at Fairleigh Dickinson	W 68–59	11–11 (7–5)	Rothman Center (1,723); Teaneck, NJ
Feb 9, 2017; 7:00 pm		at Saint Francis (PA)	W 76–74 ^{OT}	12–11 (8–5)	DeGol Arena (1,105); Loretto, PA
Feb 11, 2017; 4:00 pm		at Robert Morris	L 48–50	12–12 (8–6)	Charles L. Sewall Center (1,096); Moon Township, PA
Feb 16, 2017; 7:00 pm, ESPN3		Mount St. Mary's	W 69–65	13–12 (9–6)	Spiro Sports Center (1,722); Staten Island, NY
Feb 18, 2017; 4:00 pm		at St. Francis Brooklyn	W 73–55	14–12 (10–6)	Generoso Pope Athletic Complex (533); Brooklyn, NY
Feb 23, 2017; 7:00 pm		Bryant	W 69–66	15–12 (11–6)	Spiro Sports Center (1,834); Staten Island, NY
Feb 25, 2017; 4:00 pm		LIU Brooklyn	L 84–88 ^{OT}	15–13 (11–7)	Spiro Sports Center (1,382); Staten Island, NY
NEC tournament
Mar 1, 2017; 7:00 pm, FCS/MSG+	(3)	(6) Fairleigh Dickinson; Quarterfinals	W 72–70	16–13	Spiro Sports Center (1,514); Staten Island, NY
Mar 4, 2017; 12:00 pm, FCS/MSG	(3)	(4) Saint Francis (PA); Semifinals	L 70–71	16–14	Spiro Sports Center (1,823); Staten Island, NY
*Non-conference game. ^{#}Rankings from AP Poll. (#) Tournament seedings in parentheses. All times are in Eastern Time Source.
