= 2016–17 Bryant Bulldogs men's basketball team =

American college basketball season

2016–17 Bryant Bulldogs men's basketball
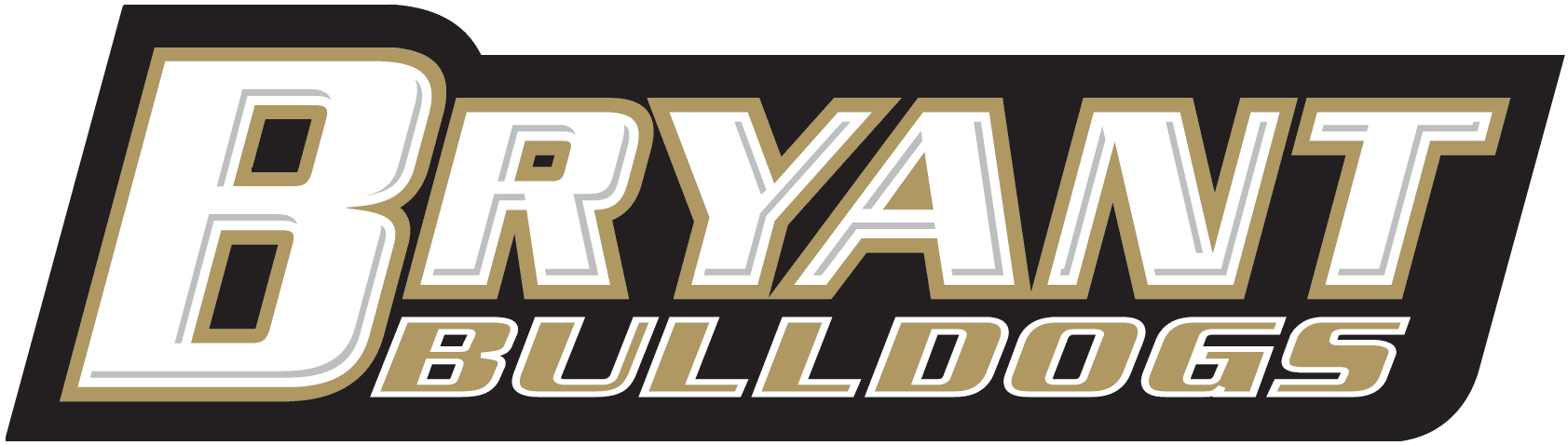
- Conference: Northeast Conference
- Record: 12–20 (9–9 NEC)
- Head coach: Tim O'Shea (9th season)
- Assistant coaches: Happy Dobbs; Chris Burns; Frankie Dobbs
- Home arena: Chace Athletic Center

2016–17 Northeast Conference men's basketball standings
	Conf.				Overall
Team	W		L	PCT	W		L	PCT
Mount St. Mary's †	14	–	4	.778	20	–	16	.556
LIU Brooklyn	13	–	5	.722	20	–	12	.625
Wagner	11	–	7	.611	16	–	14	.533
Saint Francis	11	–	7	.611	17	–	17	.500
Robert Morris	9	–	9	.500	14	–	19	.424
Bryant	9	–	9	.500	12	–	20	.375
Fairleigh Dickinson	9	–	9	.500	11	–	19	.367
Sacred Heart	8	–	10	.444	13	–	19	.406
Central Connecticut	4	–	14	.222	6	–	23	.207
St. Francis Brooklyn	2	–	16	.111	4	–	27	.129
† 2017 NEC tournament winner

The 2016–2017 Bryant Bulldogs men's basketball team represented Bryant University during the 2016–17 NCAA Division I men's basketball season. The team was led by ninth-year head coach Tim O'Shea and played their home games at the Chace Athletic Center in Smithfield, Rhode Island as members of the Northeast Conference. They finished the season 12–20, 9–9 in NEC play to finish in a three-way tie for fifth place. They lost in the quarterfinals of the NEC tournament to Saint Francis (PA).

== Previous season ==
The Bulldogs finished the 2015–16 season 8–23, 5–13 in NEC play to finish in ninth place. They failed to qualify for the NEC tournament.

== Roster ==
2016–17 Bryant Bulldogs men's basketball team
Players
Coaches

Pos.	#	Name	Height	Weight	Year	Hometown
G	0	Ikenna Ndugba	6 ft 0 in (1.83 m)	190 lb (86 kg)	Fr	Boston, Massachusetts
G	1	Hunter Ware	6 ft 2 in (1.88 m)	170 lb (77 kg)	Jr	Powder Springs, Georgia
G	2	Nisre Zouzoua	6 ft 2 in (1.88 m)	190 lb (86 kg)	So	Brockton, Massachusetts
G/F	3	Bosko Kostur	6 ft 7 in (2.01 m)	215 lb (98 kg)	Jr	Melbourne, Australia
G	5	Terrill Toe	6 ft 0 in (1.83 m)	165 lb (75 kg)	Sr	Providence, Rhode Island
G	10	Taylor McHugh	6 ft 2 in (1.88 m)	170 lb (77 kg)	So	Centreville, Virginia
G	11	Justin Brickman	5 ft 9 in (1.75 m)	155 lb (70 kg)	Sr	San Antonio, Texas
F/C	12	Marcel Pettway	6 ft 5 in (1.96 m)	250 lb (113 kg)	So	North Providence, Rhode Island
F/C	13	Monty Urmilevicius	6 ft 8 in (2.03 m)	190 lb (86 kg)	Fr	Kaunas, Lithuania
G	15	Adam Grant	6 ft 1 in (1.85 m)	170 lb (77 kg)	Fr	Franklin, Virginia
F/C	20	Gus Riley	6 ft 8 in (2.03 m)	225 lb (102 kg)	Jr	Nelson, New Zealand
G	21	Tanner Johnson	6 ft 5 in (1.96 m)	205 lb (93 kg)	Fr	Lexington, Kentucky
F	22	Dan Garvin	6 ft 6 in (1.98 m)	215 lb (98 kg)	Sr	Bethel, Connecticut
G/F	23	Brandon Carroll	6 ft 7 in (2.01 m)	190 lb (86 kg)	Fr	Brewster, New York
F	54	Sabastian Townes	6 ft 5 in (1.96 m)	240 lb (109 kg)	Fr	Chesapeake, Virginia

Head coach

- Tim O'Shea (Boston College)

Assistant coach(es)

- Frank "Happy" Dobbs (Villanova)
- Chris Burns (Bryant)
- Frankie Dobbs (Bryant)

Legend

- (C) Team captain
- (S) Suspended
- (I) Ineligible
- (W) Walk-on
- Injured
- Current redshirt

Roster

== Schedule and results ==
Date time, TV	Rank^{#}	Opponent^{#}	Result	Record	Site (attendance) city, state
Regular season
Nov 12, 2016*; 12:00 pm		at Notre Dame; Legends Classic	L 64–89	0–1	Edmund P. Joyce Center (7,062); South Bend, IN
Nov 15, 2016*; 7:00 pm		Salve Regina	W 88–61	1–1	Chace Athletic Center (565); Smithfield, RI
Nov 18, 2016*; 8:30 pm, RTNW		at No. 14 Gonzaga	L 70–109	1–2	McCarthey Athletic Center (6,000); Spokane, WA
Nov 21, 2016*; 9:05 pm		at Eastern Washington; Legends Classic	L 77–81	1–3	Reese Court (1,221); Cheney, WA
Nov 22, 2016*; 6:35 pm		vs. Louisiana–Monroe; Legends Classic	W 64–57	2–3	Reese Court (300); Cheney, WA
Nov 25, 2016*; 2:00 pm		at Northwestern; Legends Classic	L 66–86	2–4	Welsh-Ryan Arena (6,322); Evanston, IL
Nov 28, 2016*; 7:00 pm		at Brown	L 90–91	2–5	Pizzitola Sports Center (636); Providence, RI
Nov 30, 2016*; 7:00 pm		Yale	W 79–70	3–5	Chace Athletic Center; Smithfield, RI
Dec 3, 2016*; 3:30 pm		at Ohio	L 53–79	3–6	Convocation Center (6,895); Athens, OH
Dec 6, 2016*; 7:00 pm		at Navy	L 74–76	3–7	Alumni Hall (417); Annapolis, MD
Dec 10, 2016*; 3:00 pm		New Hampshire	L 73–86	3–8	Chace Athletic Center (593); Smithfield, RI
Dec 22, 2016*; 11:00 am		Dartmouth	L 69–75	3–9	Chace Athletic Center (776); Smithfield, RI
Dec 29, 2016; 4:00 pm		at St. Francis Brooklyn	L 77–80 ^{OT}	3–10 (0–1)	Generoso Pope Athletic Complex (513); Brooklyn, NY
Dec 31, 2016; 4:30 pm		at LIU Brooklyn	L 63–74	3–11 (0–2)	Steinberg Wellness Center (638); Brooklyn, NY
Jan 5, 2017; 7:00 pm		Mount St. Mary's	W 72–71	4–11 (1–2)	Chace Athletic Center (210); Smithfield, RI
Jan 7, 2017; 3:00 pm		at Fairleigh Dickinson	L 84–87	4–12 (1–3)	Rothman Center (702); Hackensack, NJ
Jan 12, 2017; 7:00 pm		Wagner	W 77–66	5–12 (2–3)	Chace Athletic Center (429); Smithfield, RI
Jan 14, 2017; 4:00 pm		Sacred Heart	L 110–112 ^{3OT}	5–13 (2–4)	Chace Athletic Center (508); Smithfield, RI
Jan 16, 2017*; 7:00 pm		Harvard	L 65–70	5–14	Chace Athletic Center (598); Smithfield, RI
Jan 19, 2017; 7:00 pm		at Saint Francis (PA)	L 61–75	5–15 (2–5)	DeGol Arena (715); Loretto, PA
Jan 21, 2017; 4:00 pm		at Robert Morris	W 59–56	6–15 (3–5)	Charles L. Sewall Center (1,047); Moon Township, PA
Jan 25, 2017; 7:00 pm		at Central Connecticut	W 65–54	7–15 (4–5)	William H. Detrick Gymnasium (1,417); New Britain, CT
Jan 28, 2017; 12:00 pm		Fairleigh Dickinson	W 73–72 ^{OT}	8–15 (5–5)	Chace Athletic Center (738); Smithfield, RI
Feb 2, 2017; 7:00 pm		at Mount St. Mary's	L 70–77	8–16 (5–6)	Knott Arena (2,512); Emmitsburg, MD
Feb 4, 2017; 3:30 pm		at Sacred Heart	L 70–73 ^{OT}	8–17 (5–7)	William H. Pitt Center (536); Fairfield, CT
Feb 9, 2017; 7:00 pm		LIU Brooklyn	L 85–88 ^{OT}	8–18 (5–8)	Chace Athletic Center (872); Smithfield, RI
Feb 11, 2017; 4:00 pm		St. Francis Brooklyn	W 80–69	9–18 (6–8)	Chace Athletic Center (560); Smithfield, RI
Feb 16, 2017; 7:00 pm		Robert Morris	W 81–73	10–18 (7–8)	Chace Athletic Center (650); Smithfield, RI
Feb 18, 2017; 4:00 pm		Saint Francis (PA)	W 79–75	11–18 (8–8)	Chace Athletic Center (524); Smithfield, RI
Feb 23, 2017; 7:00 pm		at Wagner	L 66–69	11–19 (8–9)	Spiro Sports Center (1,834); Staten Island, NY
Feb 25, 2017; 1:00 pm		Central Connecticut	W 91–77	12–19 (9–9)	Chace Athletic Center (659); Smithfield, RI
NEC tournament
Mar 1, 2017; 7:00 pm	(5)	at (4) Saint Francis (PA); Quarterfinals	L 78–100	12–20	DeGol Arena (746); Loretto, PA
*Non-conference game. ^{#}Rankings from AP Poll. (#) Tournament seedings in parentheses. All times are in Eastern Time..
