= 2016–17 Saint Francis Red Flash men's basketball team =

American college basketball season

2016–17 Saint Francis Red Flash men's basketball

Hugh Durham Classic champions

CIT, Second Round
- Conference: Northeast Conference
- Record: 17–17 (11–7 NEC)
- Head coach: Rob Krimmel (5th season)
- Associate head coach: Andrew Helton
- Assistant coaches: Eric Taylor; Umar Shannon
- Home arena: DeGol Arena

2016–17 Northeast Conference men's basketball standings
	Conf.				Overall
Team	W		L	PCT	W		L	PCT
Mount St. Mary's †	14	–	4	.778	20	–	16	.556
LIU Brooklyn	13	–	5	.722	20	–	12	.625
Wagner	11	–	7	.611	16	–	14	.533
Saint Francis	11	–	7	.611	17	–	17	.500
Robert Morris	9	–	9	.500	14	–	19	.424
Bryant	9	–	9	.500	12	–	20	.375
Fairleigh Dickinson	9	–	9	.500	11	–	19	.367
Sacred Heart	8	–	10	.444	13	–	19	.406
Central Connecticut	4	–	14	.222	6	–	23	.207
St. Francis Brooklyn	2	–	16	.111	4	–	27	.129
† 2017 NEC tournament winner

The 2016–17 Saint Francis Red Flash men's basketball team represented Saint Francis University during the 2016–17 NCAA Division I men's basketball season. The Red Flash, led by fifth-year head coach Rob Krimmel, played their home games at the DeGol Arena in Loretto, Pennsylvania as members of the Northeast Conference. They finished the season 17–17, 11–7 in NEC play to finish in a tie for third place. They defeated Bryant and Wagner to advance to the Championship game of the NEC tournament where they lost to Mount St. Mary's. They were invited to the CollegeInsider.com Tournament where they defeated Jacksonville in the first round to win the Hugh Durham Classic. However, they lost in the second round to UMBC.

== Previous season ==
The Red Flash finished the 2015–16 season 13–17, 9–9 in NEC play to finish in a tie for sixth place. They lost in the quarterfinals of the NEC tournament to Fairleigh Dickinson.

== Roster ==
2016–17 Saint Francis Red Flash men's basketball team
Players
Coaches

Pos.	#	Name	Height	Weight	Year	Previous school	Hometown
F/C	0	Ifeanyi Umezurike	6 ft 10 in (2.08 m)	240 lb (109 kg)	So	Montverde Academy	Uturu, Abia State, Nigeria
G	1	Malik Harmon (redshirt)	6 ft 0 in (1.83 m)	194 lb (88 kg)	Sr	Christ the King HS	Queens, NY
G	2	Scott Meredith	6 ft 2 in (1.88 m)	180 lb (82 kg)	So	Hargrave Military Academy	Pilot Mountain, NC
G	3	Jamaal King	5 ft 10 in (1.78 m)	170 lb (77 kg)	So	Bishop O'Connell HS	Salisbury, MD
G	4	Randall Gaskins Jr.	6 ft 3 in (1.91 m)	180 lb (82 kg)	Fr	Bishop O'Connell HS	Woodbridge, VA
F/C	5	Daniel Wallace	6 ft 8 in (2.03 m)	215 lb (98 kg)	Jr	Nansemond River HS	Suffolk, VA
G	11	Isaiah Blackmon	6 ft 1 in (1.85 m)	170 lb (77 kg)	So	West Charlotte HS	Charlotte, NC
G	13	Keith Braxton	6 ft 4 in (1.93 m)	208 lb (94 kg)	Fr	Lawrenceville School	Glassboro, NJ
G	14	Andre Wolford	6 ft 2 in (1.88 m)	175 lb (79 kg)	So	Saint Ignatius HS	North Olmsted, OH
G	15	Deon Baker	6 ft 5 in (1.96 m)	220 lb (100 kg)	Jr	CC of Beaver County	Pittsburgh, PA
G	21	Tre McKeithen	6 ft 1 in (1.85 m)	180 lb (82 kg)	Jr	Taylor Allderdice HS	Pittsburgh, PA
G	22	Michael Klebon	6 ft 2 in (1.88 m)	175 lb (79 kg)	So	Southern Columbia Area HS	Paxinos, PA
G	23	Georgios Angelou	6 ft 1 in (1.85 m)	185 lb (84 kg)	Sr	Lykeio Kanithou	Halkida, Greece
G	24	Jordan Forehand	6 ft 0 in (1.83 m)	180 lb (82 kg)	So	IMG Academy	Bridgewater, NJ
F/C	30	Deivydas Kuzavas	6 ft 10 in (2.08 m)	210 lb (95 kg)	Fr	St. Mary's Ryken HS	Kretinga, Lithuania
F/C	32	Josh Nebo	6 ft 8 in (2.03 m)	215 lb (98 kg)	So	Cypress Lakes HS	Houston, TX
F	33	Patrick Wrencher	6 ft 6 in (1.98 m)	250 lb (113 kg)	Sr	Archbishop Moeller HS	West Chester, OH

Head coach

- Rob Krimmel (Saint Francis (PA))

Assistant coach(es)

- Andrew Helton (Miami (OH))
- Eric Taylor (Saint Francis (PA))
- Umar Shannon (Saint Francis (PA))

Legend

- (C) Team captain
- (S) Suspended
- (I) Ineligible
- (W) Walk-on
- Injured
- Current redshirt

Roster

== Schedule and results ==
Date time, TV	Rank^{#}	Opponent^{#}	Result	Record	Site (attendance) city, state
Non-conference regular season
Nov 12, 2016*; 4:00 pm		at St. Bonaventure	L 82–92	0–1	Reilly Center (4,322); Olean, NY
Nov 16, 2016*; 7:00 pm		at Duquesne	W 89–75	0–2	A. J. Palumbo Center (1,025); Pittsburgh, PA
Nov 19, 2016*; 7:00 pm		Chatham	W 119–59	1–2	DeGol Arena (714); Loretto, PA
Nov 23, 2016*; 7:00 pm		Longwood	W 87–72	2–2	DeGol Arena (506); Loretto, PA
Nov 26, 2016*; 2:00 pm		at American	W 69–62	3–2	Bender Arena (432); Washington, DC
Nov 30, 2016*; 7:00 pm		at NJIT	L 70–83	3–3	Fleisher Center (752); Newark, NJ
Dec 03, 2016*; 7:00 pm		Binghamton	L 70–73	3–4	DeGol Arena (671); Loretto, PA
Dec 12, 2016*; 7:00 pm		at Lehigh	L 67–100	3–5	Stabler Arena (774); Bethlehem, PA
Dec 17, 2016*; 1:00 pm		Stony Brook	L 63–75	3–6	DeGol Arena (336); Loretto, PA
Dec 19, 2016*; 7:00 pm		at Marquette	L 65–78	3–7	BMO Harris Bradley Center (11,868); Milwaukee, WI
Dec 21, 2016*; 8:00 pm		at Texas A&M	L 58–81	3–8	Reed Arena (9,207); College Station, TX
NEC regular season
Dec 29, 2017; 7:30 pm		at Fairleigh Dickinson	L 65–77	3–9 (0–1)	Rothman Center (914); Teaneck, NJ
Dec 31, 2017; 3:30 pm		Sacred Heart	W 87–67	4–9 (1–1)	William H. Pitt Center (275); Fairfield, CT
Jan 5, 2017; 7:00 pm		St. Francis Brooklyn	W 81–56	5–9 (2–1)	DeGol Arena; Loretto, PA
Jan 7, 2017; 4:00 pm		LIU Brooklyn	L 70–83	5–10 (2–2)	DeGol Arena (747); Loretto, PA
Jan 12, 2017; 6:00 pm		at Robert Morris	W 77–57	6–10 (3–2)	Charles L. Sewall Center (812); Moon Township, PA
Jan 14, 2017; 4:00 pm		at Mount St. Mary's	L 72–78	6–11 (3–3)	Knott Arena (2,068); Emmitsburg, MD
Jan 19, 2017; 7:00 pm		Bryant	W 75–61	7–11 (4–3)	DeGol Arena (715); Loretto, PA
Jan 21, 2017; 3:00 pm		Central Connecticut	L 83–84 ^{OT}	7–12 (4–4)	DeGol Arena (978); Loretto, PA
Jan 26, 2017; 7:00 pm		at Wagner	W 72–67	8–12 (5–4)	Spiro Sports Center (1,601); Staten Island, NY
Jan 28, 2017; 7:00 pm		Robert Morris	W 89–83 ^{OT}	9–12 (6–4)	DeGol Arena (1,510); Loretto, PA
Feb 2, 2017; 7:00 pm		at St. Francis Brooklyn	W 78–61	10–12 (7–4)	Generoso Pope Athletic Complex (347); Brooklyn, NY
Feb 4, 2017; 4:30 pm		at LIU Brooklyn	W 80–78	11–12 (8–4)	Steinberg Wellness Center (597); Brooklyn, NY
Feb 9, 2017; 7:00 pm		Wagner	L 74–76 ^{OT}	11–13 (8–5)	DeGol Arena (1,105); Loretto, PA
Feb 11, 2017; 1:00 pm		Mount St. Mary's	L 62–81	11–14 (8–6)	DeGol Arena (1,048); Loretto, PA
Feb 16, 2017; 7:00 pm		at Central Connecticut	W 80–71	12–14 (9–6)	William H. Detrick Gymnasium (1,009); New Britain, CT
Feb 18, 2017; 4:00 pm		at Bryant	L 75–79	12–15 (9–7)	Chace Athletic Center (524); Smithfield, RI
Feb 23, 2017; 7:00 pm		Sacred Heart	W 73–64	13–15 (10–7)	DeGol Arena (778); Loretto, PA
Feb 25, 2017; 7:00 pm		Fairleigh Dickinson	W 70–64	14–15 (11–7)	DeGol Arena (814); Loretto, PA
NEC tournament
Mar 1, 2017; 7:00 pm	(4)	(5) Bryant; Quarterfinals	W 100–78	15–15	DeGol Arena (746); Loretto, PA
Mar 4, 2017; 12:00 pm, FCS/MSG	(4)	at (3) Wagner; Semifinals	L 70–71	16–15	Spiro Sports Center (1,823); Staten Island, NY
Mar 7, 2017; 7:00 pm, ESPN2	(4)	at (1) Mount St. Mary's; Championship game	L 61–71	16–16	Knott Arena (3,121); Emmitsburg, MD
CIT
Mar 14, 2017*; 7:00 pm, Facebook Live		at Jacksonville; First Round; Hugh Durham Classic	W 78–76	17–16	Swisher Gymnasium (734); Jacksonville, FL
Mar 18, 2017*; 2:00 pm, Facebook Live		at UMBC; Second Round	L 79–87	17–17	Retriever Activities Center (904); Catonsville, MD
*Non-conference game. ^{#}Rankings from AP Poll. (#) Tournament seedings in parentheses. All times are in Eastern Time. Source.
