= 2017 Northeast Conference men's basketball tournament =

- Classification: Division I
- Season: 2016–17
- Teams: 8
- Site: campus sites
- Champions: Mount St. Mary's (5th title)
- Winning coach: Jamion Christian (2nd title)
- MVP: Elijah Long (MSM)

2016–17 Northeast Conference men's basketball standings
	Conf.				Overall
Team	W		L	PCT	W		L	PCT
Mount St. Mary's †	14	–	4	.778	20	–	16	.556
LIU Brooklyn	13	–	5	.722	20	–	12	.625
Wagner	11	–	7	.611	16	–	14	.533
Saint Francis	11	–	7	.611	17	–	17	.500
Robert Morris	9	–	9	.500	14	–	19	.424
Bryant	9	–	9	.500	12	–	20	.375
Fairleigh Dickinson	9	–	9	.500	11	–	19	.367
Sacred Heart	8	–	10	.444	13	–	19	.406
Central Connecticut	4	–	14	.222	6	–	23	.207
St. Francis Brooklyn	2	–	16	.111	4	–	27	.129
† 2017 NEC tournament winner

The 2017 Northeast Conference men's basketball tournament is the postseason men's basketball tournament for the Northeast Conference. The tournament is being held from March 1–7, 2017. All games of the tournament took place on campus sites hosted by the higher-seeded school. The winner, Mount St. Mary's, earned the conference's automatic bid to the 2017 NCAA tournament with a 71-61 win over St. Francis (PA) in the finals.

== Seeds ==
For the 13th straight year, the NEC Men’s Basketball Tournament consists of an eight-team playoff format with all games played at the home of the higher seed. After the quarterfinals, the teams will be reseeded so the highest remaining seed plays the lowest remaining seed in the semifinals.

The teams were seeded by record in conference, with a tiebreaker system to seed teams with identical conference records.

Seed	School	Conference	Tiebreaker
1	Mount St. Mary's	14–4	
2	LIU Brooklyn	13–5	
3	Wagner	11–7	1–1 vs SFPA, 1–1 vs MSM
4	Saint Francis (PA)	11–7	1–1 vs WAG, 0–2 vs MSM
5	Bryant	9–9	3–1 vs FDU/RMU
6	Fairleigh Dickinson	9–9	2–2 vs BRY/RMU
7	Robert Morris	9–9	1–3 vs BRY/FDU
8	Sacred Heart	8–10	

== Schedule ==
Game	Time*	Matchup	Score	Television	Attendance
Quarterfinals – Wednesday, March 1
1	7:00 pm	#8 Sacred Heart at #1 Mount St. Mary's	73–76	NEC Front Row	2,405
2	9:00 pm	#7 Robert Morris at #2 LIU Brooklyn	69–68	MSG+/FCS/NEC Front Row	1,422
3	7:00 pm	#6 Fairleigh Dickinson at #3 Wagner	70–72	MSG+/FCS/NEC Front Row	1,514
4	7:00 pm	#5 Bryant at #4 Saint Francis (PA)	65–74	NEC Front Row	746
Semifinals – Saturday, March 4
5	2:00 pm	#7 Robert Morris at #1 Mount St. Mary's	66–75	MSG/FCS	2,867
6	12:00 pm	#4 Saint Francis (PA) at #3 Wagner	71–70	MSG/FCS	1,823
Championship – Tuesday, March 7
7	7:00 pm	#4 Saint Francis (PA) at #1 Mount St. Mary's	61-71	ESPN2	3,121
*Game times in ET. Rankings denote tournament seeding. All games hosted by higher-seeded team.

== Bracket ==
Teams will be reseeded after each round with highest remaining seeds receiving home court advantage.

Quarterfinals; Wednesday, March 1
1	Mount St. Mary's	76
8	Sacred Heart	73
4	Saint Francis (PA)	100
5	Bryant	78
(Pairings are reseeded after the first round)
2	LIU Brooklyn	68
7	Robert Morris	69
3	Wagner	72
6	Fairleigh Dickinson	70

Semifinals; Saturday, March 4
1	Mount St. Mary's	75
7	Robert Morris	66
3	Wagner	70
4	Saint Francis (PA)	71

Championship; Tuesday, March 7
1	Mount St. Mary's	71
4	Saint Francis (PA)	61

All games will be played at the venue of the higher seed

== All-tournament team ==
Tournament MVP in bold.

Name	School	Pos.	Year	Ht.	Hometown
**Elijah Long**	Mount St. Mary's	Guard	Sophomore	6-0	Mississauga, Ontario
Lamont "Junior" Robinson	Mount St. Mary's	Guard	Junior	5-5	Mebane, North Carolina
Michael Carey	Wagner	Guard/Forward	Senior	6-5	Nassau, Bahamas
Josh Nebo	Saint Francis (PA)	Forward	Sophomore	6-8	Houston, Texas
Keith Braxton	Saint Francis (PA)	Guard	Freshman	6-4	Glassboro, New Jersey
