= Gunnar Ólafsson =

Icelandic basketball player (born 1993)

Personal information
- Born: 9 June 1993 (age 33)
- Listed height: 191 cm (6 ft 3 in)
- Listed weight: 88 kg (194 lb)

Career information
- College: St. Francis Brooklyn (2014–2018)
- NBA draft: 2018: undrafted
- Playing career: 2012–present
- Position: Guard

Career history
- 2012–2013: Fjölnir
- 2013–2014: Keflavík
- 2018–2019: Keflavík
- 2019: Oviedo
- 2019–2022: Stjarnan
- 2022–2024: Fryshuset Basket
- 2024–2025: Fjölnir

Career highlights
- 2× Icelandic Cup (2020, 2022); Icelandic Company Cup (2013); Icelandic Super Cup (2020); Icelandic All-Star (2014)
Medals
Men's basketball
Representing Iceland
Games of the Small States of Europe
Bronze medal – third place	2017 San Marino	Team
Bronze medal – third place	2019 Montenegro	Team

Gunnar Ólafsson (born 9 June 1993) is an Icelandic basketball player and a former member of the Icelandic national team.

== Playing career ==
After starting his career with Fjölnir, Gunnar moved to Keflavík in 2013. In September 2013, he helped Keflavík win the Icelandic Company Cup, defeating KR in the Cup finals. In January 2014, he was selected to the Icelandic All-Star game.

In 2014, he joined St. Francis College and played there for four years.

He returned to Keflavík in 2018 and averaged 14.1 points and 3.9 rebounds during the 2018–19 Úrvalsdeild karla season. After the season, he terminated his contract with Keflavík, siting his desire to play overseas.

On 9 August 2019, Gunnar signed with LEB Oro club Oviedo CB. Three months later, he was waived by the club after appearing in 8 games, including 3 starts, where he averaged 3.0 points per game.

On 4 December 2019, Gunnar signed with returned to the Úrvalsdeild karla and signed with Stjarnan. On 15 February 2020, Gunnar won the Icelandic Cup for the first time after Stjarnan's 75–89 win against Grindavík in the Cup finals.

On 19 March 2022, he won his second Icelandic Basketball Cup when Stjarnan defeated reigning national champions Þór Þorlákshöfn in the 2022 Cup Finals.

In August 2022, Gunnar signed with Swedish Basketball League club Fryshuset Basket.

After two seasons in Sweden, Gunnar returned to Iceland and signed with Fjölnir in August 2024.

== National team career ==
Gunnar was first selected to the Icelandic men's national basketball team in 2017 and played with the team during the Games of the Small States of Europe in 2017 and 2019.

== Personal life ==
Gunnar's uncle is former Icelandic national team player Falur Harðarson.
