= Jerome Frink =

American basketball player (born 1993)

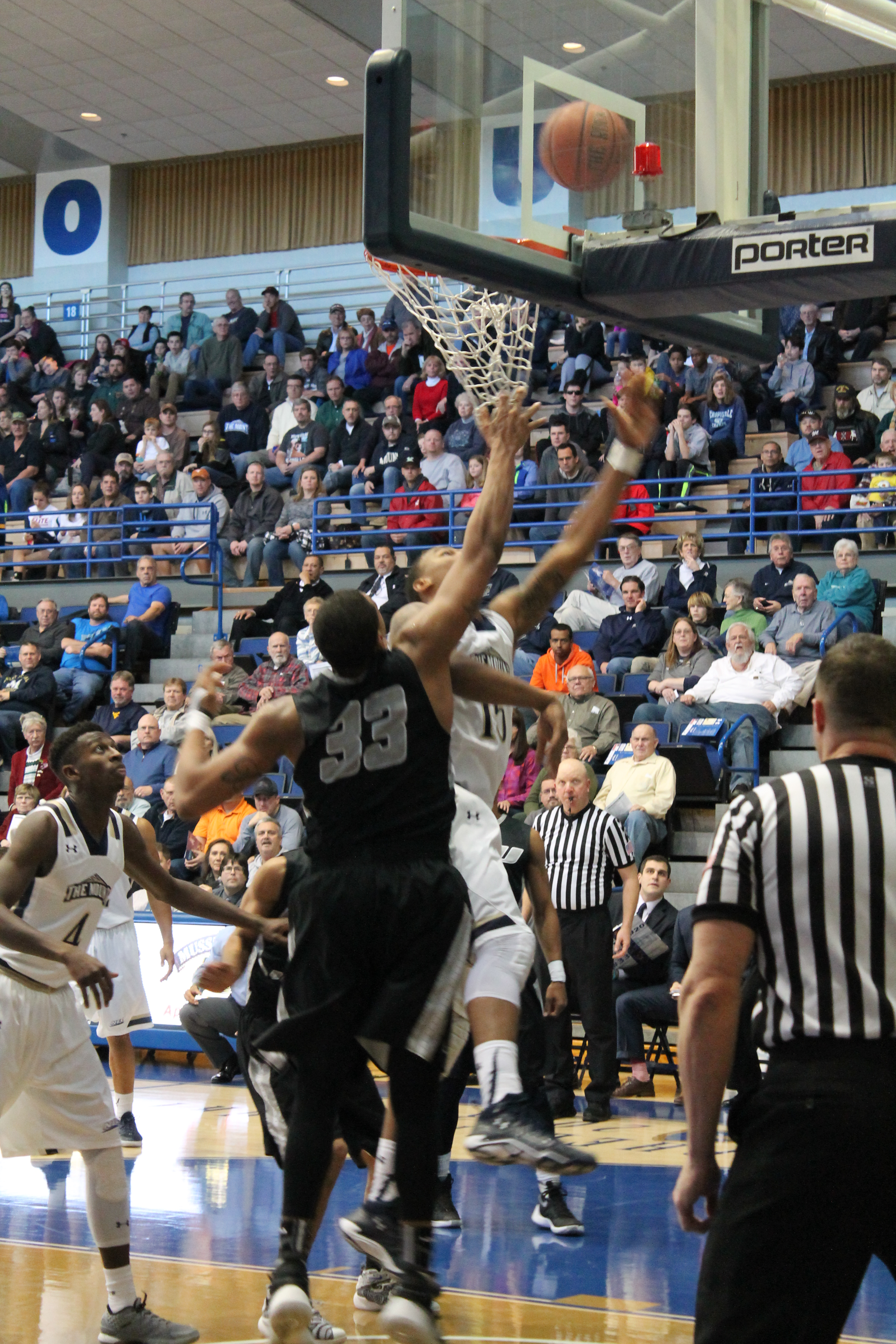
- Frink (33) contests a shot

AB Contern
- Position: Power forward
- League: Total League

Personal information
- Born: December 1, 1993 (age 32)
- Listed height: 6 ft 7 in (2.01 m)
- Listed weight: 230 lb (104 kg)

Career information
- High school: St. Anthony (Jersey City, New Jersey)
- College: FIU (2012–2014); LIU Brooklyn (2015–2017)
- NBA draft: 2017: undrafted
- Playing career: 2017–present

Career history
- 2017: Windy City Bulls
- 2018: San Lázaro
- 2018–2019: Domingo Paulino Santiago
- 2019–2020: Þór Þorlákshöfn
- 2020–present: AB Contern

Career highlights
- AP Honorable Mention All-American (2017); NEC Player of the Year (2017); 2× First-team All-NEC (2016, 2017)

Jerome Frink (born December 1, 1993) is an American basketball player for AB Contern of the Total League. He played college basketball for Florida International University (FIU) and LIU Brooklyn. He was named the 2017 Northeast Conference Player of the Year.

== College career ==
Frink was recruited from St. Anthony High School in Jersey City, New Jersey, where he starred with future National Basketball Association player Kyle Anderson. He was recruited to FIU by coach Isiah Thomas and played two seasons for the Panthers. Frink was an immediate impact player for the Blackbirds, averaging 16.6 points and 9 rebounds per game and earning first-team All-Northeast Conference (NEC) honors. He followed this season as a senior by averaging 16.8 points and 8.9 rebounds and scoring NEC Player of the Year honors.

== Professional career ==
In December 2019, Frink signed with Þór Þorlákshöfn of the Icelandic Úrvalsdeild karla, replacing fellow American Vincent Bailey.

On July 5, 2020, he has signed with AB Contern of the Total League.
