= 2016–17 Ivy League men's basketball season =

- League: NCAA Division I
- Sport: Basketball
- Duration: January 7 – March 12, 2017
- Teams: 8
- TV partner: Ivy League Digital Network

Regular season
- Champions: Princeton
- Season MVP: Spencer Weisz, Princeton

2017 Ivy League men's basketball tournament
- Champions: Princeton
- Runners-up: Yale

Basketball seasons
- 2015–16 2017–18

2016–17 Ivy League men's basketball standings
	Conf.				Overall
Team	W		L	PCT	W		L	PCT
x-Princeton †	14	–	0	1.000	23	–	7	.767
Harvard	10	–	4	.714	18	–	10	.643
Yale	9	–	5	.643	18	–	11	.621
Penn	6	–	8	.429	13	–	15	.464
Columbia	5	–	9	.357	11	–	16	.407
Brown	4	–	10	.286	13	–	17	.433
Cornell	4	–	10	.286	8	–	21	.276
Dartmouth	4	–	10	.286	7	–	20	.259
† 2017 Ivy League Tournament winner x – Ivy League champions

The 2016–17 Ivy League men's basketball season marked the continuation of the annual tradition of competitive basketball among Ivy League members. The tradition began when the league was formed during the 1956–57 season and its history extends to the predecessor Eastern Intercollegiate Basketball League, which was formed in 1902.

Princeton earned the league title after finishing the regular season 14–0 within the Ivy League. Princeton earned the league's bid to the 2017 NCAA Men's Division I Basketball Tournament after defeating Pennsylvania in the semifinals and Yale in the finals of the inaugural conference tournament.

The 2017 Ivy League Men's Basketball Tournament was the first conference tournament in Ivy League history, marking a major structural change for a league that had previously sent its regular season champion directly to the NCAA Tournament. The inaugural tournament was held at the Palestra in Philadelphia on March 11–12, 2017. Princeton's loss to Notre Dame in the Round of 64 by a score of 60–58 was decided in the final seconds, with the Tigers having led for much of the game.

Spencer Weisz of Princeton was named Ivy League Men's Basketball Player of the Year.

== All-Ivy Teams ==
First Team All-Ivy
	School	Class	Position
Bryce Aiken*	Harvard	Freshman	Guard
Steven Spieth*	Brown	Senior	Guard
Spencer Weisz*	Princeton	Senior	Forward
Myles Stephens*	Princeton	Sophomore	Guard
Siyani Chambers*	Harvard	Senior	Guard
Steven Cook*	Princeton	Senior	Forward

*Unanimous

Second Team All-Ivy
	School	Class	Position
Evan Boudreaux	Dartmouth	Sophomore	Forward
Miye Oni	Yale	Freshman	Guard
Luke Petrasek	Columbia	Freshman	Forward
A.J. Brodeur	Penn	Freshman	Forward
Matt Morgan	Cornell	Sophomore	Guard

== NCAA tournament ==
Seed	Region	School	First Four	Round of 64	Round of 32	Sweet 16	Elite Eight	Final Four	Championship
13	West	Princeton	n/a	Eliminated by Notre Dame, 60–58					
		W–L (%):	0–0 –	0–1 .000	0–0 –	0–0 –	0–0 –	0–0 –	0–0 –Total:0-1 .000
