= 2016–17 Harvard Crimson men's basketball team =

American college basketball season

2016–17 Harvard Crimson men's basketball
- Conference: Ivy League
- Record: 18–10 (10–4 Ivy)
- Head coach: Tommy Amaker (10th season)
- Assistant coaches: Brian DeStefano; Donny Guerinoni; Michael Sotsky
- Home arena: Lavietes Pavilion

2016–17 Ivy League men's basketball standings
	Conf.				Overall
Team	W		L	PCT	W		L	PCT
x-Princeton †	14	–	0	1.000	23	–	7	.767
Harvard	10	–	4	.714	18	–	10	.643
Yale	9	–	5	.643	18	–	11	.621
Penn	6	–	8	.429	13	–	15	.464
Columbia	5	–	9	.357	11	–	16	.407
Brown	4	–	10	.286	13	–	17	.433
Cornell	4	–	10	.286	8	–	21	.276
Dartmouth	4	–	10	.286	7	–	20	.259
† 2017 Ivy League Tournament winner x – Ivy League champions

The 2016–17 Harvard Crimson men's basketball team represented Harvard University during the 2016–17 NCAA Division I men's basketball season. The Crimson, led by 10th-year head coach Tommy Amaker, played their home games at Lavietes Pavilion in Boston, Massachusetts and were members of the Ivy League. They finished the season 18–10, 10–4 in Ivy League play to finish in second place. They lost in the semifinals of the inaugural Ivy League tournament to Yale.

== Previous season ==
The Crimson finished the 2015–16 season 14–16, 6–8 in Ivy League play to finish in fourth place.

== Offseason ==
=== Departures ===
Name	Number	Pos.	Height	Weight	Year	Hometown	Notes
Hunter Meyers	5	F	6'7"	225	Sophomore	Minden, NV	Left the team for personal reasons
Patrick Steeves	10	G/F	6'7"	220	Senior	Montreal, QE	Graduate transferred to George Washington
Evan Cummins	33	F	6'8"	215	Senior	Westborough, MA	Graduated
Agunwa Okolie	35	G/F	6'8"	205	Senior	Ajax, ON	Graduated

=== 2016 recruiting class ===
College recruiting information
Name	Hometown	School	Height	Weight	Commit date
Chris Lewis #16 PF	Alpharetta, GA	Milton High School	6 ft 8 in (2.03 m)	235 lb (107 kg)	Jan 18, 2015
Chris Lewis #16 PF	Recruit ratings: Scout: Rivals: (85)				
Robert Baker #25 PF	Woodstock, GA	The Walker School	6 ft 9 in (2.06 m)	190 lb (86 kg)	Aug 13, 2015
Robert Baker #25 PF	Recruit ratings: Scout: Rivals: (82)				
Seth Towns #20 SF	Columbus, OH	Northland High School	6 ft 7 in (2.01 m)	200 lb (91 kg)	Jun 15, 2015
Seth Towns #20 SF	Recruit ratings: Scout: Rivals: (82)				
Bryce Aiken #19 PG	Randolph, NJ	The Patrick School	6 ft 0 in (1.83 m)	185 lb (84 kg)	Oct 8, 2015
Bryce Aiken #19 PG	Recruit ratings: Scout: Rivals: (82)				
Justin Bassey #29 SF	Aurora, CO	Colorado Academy	6 ft 5 in (1.96 m)	210 lb (95 kg)	Mar 25, 2015
Justin Bassey #29 SF	Recruit ratings: Scout: Rivals: (79)				
Henry Welsh #51 C	Los Angeles, CA	Loyola High School	6 ft 5 in (1.96 m)	230 lb (100 kg)	Mar 25, 2015
Henry Welsh #51 C	Recruit ratings: Scout: Rivals: (70)				
Christian Juzang #66 PG	Calabasas, CA	Viewpoint High School	6 ft 2 in (1.88 m)	175 lb (79 kg)	Apr 30, 2015
Christian Juzang #66 PG	Recruit ratings: Scout: Rivals: (66)				
Overall recruit ranking:
Note: In many cases, Scout, Rivals, 247Sports, On3, and ESPN may conflict in their listings of height and weight.; In these cases, the average was taken. ESPN grades are on a 100-point scale.; Sources: "Harvard 2016 Basketball Commitments". Rivals.; "2016 Harvard Basketball Commits". Scout.; "ESPN Recruiting Nation Basketball". ESPN.; "Scout.com Team Recruiting Rankings". Scout.; "2016 Team Ranking". Rivals.

=== 2017 recruiting class ===
College recruiting information (2017)
Name	Hometown	School	Height	Weight	Commit date
Mario Haskett; SG	Chesterfield, VA	Lloyd C. Bird High School	6 ft 3 in (1.91 m)	175 lb (79 kg)	Jun 16, 2016
Mario Haskett; SG	Recruit ratings: Scout: Rivals: (NR)				
Overall recruit ranking:
Note: In many cases, Scout, Rivals, 247Sports, On3, and ESPN may conflict in their listings of height and weight.; In these cases, the average was taken. ESPN grades are on a 100-point scale.; Sources: "Harvard 2017 Basketball Commitments". Rivals.; "2017 Harvard Basketball Commits". Scout.; "ESPN Recruiting Nation Basketball". ESPN.; "Scout.com Team Recruiting Rankings". Scout.; "2017 Team Ranking". Rivals.

== Roster ==
2016–17 Harvard Crimson men's basketball team
Players
Coaches

Pos.	#	Name	Height	Weight	Year	Previous school	Hometown
F	0	Chris Lewis	6 ft 9 in (2.06 m)	235 lb (107 kg)	Fr	Milton High School	Alpharetta, Georgia
G	1	Siyani Chambers (C)	6 ft 0 in (1.83 m)	170 lb (77 kg)	Sr	Hopkins High School	Golden Valley, Minnesota
G	2	James McLean	6 ft 0 in (1.83 m)	185 lb (84 kg)	So	Sacred Heart Preparatory	Atherton, California
G	3	Tommy McCarthy	6 ft 0 in (1.83 m)	175 lb (79 kg)	So	La Costa Canyon High School	Rancho Santa Fe, California
F	4	Zena Edosomwan	6 ft 9 in (2.06 m)	245 lb (111 kg)	Sr	Northfield Mount Hermon School	Los Angeles, California
G	11	Bryce Aiken	6 ft 0 in (1.83 m)	175 lb (79 kg)	Fr	The Patrick School	Randolph, New Jersey
G	12	Matt Fraschilla	5 ft 10 in (1.78 m)	165 lb (75 kg)	Sr	Highland Park High School	Dallas, Texas
G	13	Andre Chatfield	6 ft 4 in (1.93 m)	185 lb (84 kg)	Jr	Norcross High School	Lilburn, Georgia
F	14	Balsa Dragovic	6 ft 10 in (2.08 m)	220 lb (100 kg)	So	Cantwell-Sacred Heart of Mary High School	Zemun, Serbia
G	15	Corbin Miller (C)	6 ft 1 in (1.85 m)	180 lb (82 kg)	Sr	Brighton High School	Sandy, Utah
G	20	Justin Bassey	6 ft 5 in (1.96 m)	210 lb (95 kg)	Fr	Colorado Academy	Denver, Colorado
G	21	Zach Yoshor	6 ft 6 in (1.98 m)	205 lb (93 kg)	Jr	Robert M. Beren Academy	Houston, Texas
G	22	Christian Juzang	6 ft 2 in (1.88 m)	175 lb (79 kg)	Fr	Viewpoint School	Tarzana, California
F	23	Weisner Perez	6 ft 6 in (1.98 m)	210 lb (95 kg)	So	J. Sterling Morton High School West	Berwyn, Illinois
F	24	Chris Egi	6 ft 9 in (2.06 m)	220 lb (100 kg)	Jr	Montverde Academy	Markham, Ontario
G	25	Corey Johnson	6 ft 5 in (1.96 m)	200 lb (91 kg)	So	Vermont Academy	Ottawa, Ontario
F	31	Seth Towns	6 ft 7 in (2.01 m)	205 lb (93 kg)	Fr	Northland High School	Columbus, Ohio
G	32	Robbie Feinberg	6 ft 3 in (1.91 m)	200 lb (91 kg)	So	Sierra Canyon School	Hidden Hills, California
F	35	Robert Baker	6 ft 10 in (2.08 m)	202 lb (92 kg)	Fr	The Walker School	Woodstock, Georgia
F	44	Henry Welsh	6 ft 10 in (2.08 m)	250 lb (113 kg)	Fr	Loyola High School	Redondo Beach, California

Head coach

- Tommy Amaker (Duke)

Assistant coach(es)

- Brian DeStefano (Duke)
- Donny Guerinoni (Nevada)
- Michael Sotsky (Harvard)

Legend

- (C) Team captain
- (S) Suspended
- (I) Ineligible
- (W) Walk-on
- Injured
- Current redshirt

Roster

== Schedule and results ==
Date time, TV	Rank^{#}	Opponent^{#}	Result	Record	Site (attendance) city, state
Exhibition
11/03/2016*; 7:00 pm		MIT	W 59–39		Lavietes Pavilion; Boston, MA
Regular season
11/11/2016*; 11:00 pm, ESPN2		vs. Stanford; Pac-12 China Game	L 70–80	0–1	Mercedes-Benz Arena (7,196); Shanghai, China
11/17/2016*; 7:00 pm		Fisher; Homecoming	W 78–51	1–1	Lavietes Pavilion (1,429); Boston, MA
11/22/2016*; 7:00 pm		Holy Cross	L 52–63	1–2	Lavietes Pavilion (1,609); Boston, MA
11/26/2016*; 1:00 pm		at Massachusetts	L 66–70	1–3	Mullins Center (3,320); Amherst, MA
11/29/2016*; 2:00 pm		George Washington	L 74–77	1–4	Lavietes Pavilion (1,406); Boston, MA
12/03/2016*; 2:00 pm		Fordham	W 64–52	2–4	Lavietes Pavilion (1,714); Boston, MA
12/06/2016*; 7:00 pm		Northeastern	W 86–80	3–4	Lavietes Pavilion (1,517); Boston, MA
12/07/2016*; 7:00 pm, ACCN Extra		at Boston College; Rivalry	W 74–66	4–4	Conte Forum (3,832); Chestnut Hill, MA
12/23/2016*; 8:00 pm, ESPN2		at Houston	W 57–56	5–4	Hofheinz Pavilion (4,004); Houston, TX
12/30/2016*; 7:00 pm		Howard	W 67–46	6–4	Lavietes Pavilion (1,646); Boston, MA
01/02/2017*; 7:00 pm		at Vermont	L 71–82	6–5	Patrick Gym (2,312); Burlington, VT
01/07/2017; 7:00 pm		at Dartmouth	W 74–58	7–5 (1–0)	Leede Arena (1,252); Hanover, NH
01/10/2017*; 7:00 pm		McGill	W 70–45	8–5	Lavietes Pavilion (1,252); Boston, MA
01/16/2017*; 7:00 pm		at Bryant	W 70–65	9–5	Chace Athletic Center (598); Smithfield, RI
01/21/2017; 2:00 pm		Dartmouth	W 82–68	10–5 (2–0)	Lavietes Pavilion (2,195); Boston, MA
01/27/2017; 7:00 pm		at Cornell	W 77–71	11–5 (3–0)	Newman Arena (1,186); Ithaca, NY
01/28/2017; 7:00 pm		at Columbia	L 62–65	11–6 (3–1)	Levien Gymnasium (2,488); New York, NY
02/03/2017; 7:00 pm		Penn	W 69–59	12–6 (4–1)	Lavietes Pavilion (2,195); Boston, MA
02/04/2017; 7:00 pm		Princeton	L 56–57	12–7 (4–2)	Lavietes Pavilion (2,195); Boston, MA
02/10/2017; 7:00 pm		at Brown	W 87–74	13–7 (5–2)	Pizzitola Sports Center (1,581); Providence, RI
02/11/2017; 7:00 pm		at Yale	W 75–67	14–7 (6–2)	John J. Lee Amphitheater (2,532); New Haven, CT
02/17/2017; 7:00 pm, ESPN3		Columbia	W 78–72	15–7 (7–2)	Lavietes Pavilion (1,935); Boston, MA
02/18/2017; 7:00 pm		Cornell	W 87–75	16–7 (8–2)	Lavietes Pavilion (1,979); Boston, MA
02/24/2017; 7:00 pm, ESPN3		Yale	W 77–64	17–7 (9–2)	Lavietes Pavilion (2,195); Boston, MA
02/25/2017; 7:00 pm		Brown	W 77–58	18–7 (10–2)	Lavietes Pavilion; Boston, MA
03/03/2017; 7:00 pm, ESPNU		at Princeton	L 69–73	18–8 (10–3)	Jadwin Gymnasium (3,799); Princeton, NJ
03/04/2017; 7:00 pm		at Penn	L 72–75	18–9 (10–4)	Palestra (4,451); Philadelphia, PA
Ivy League Men's tournament
03/11/2017; 4:00 pm, ESPNU	(2)	vs. (3) Yale; Semifinals	L 71–73	18–10	Palestra; Philadelphia, PA
*Non-conference game. ^{#}Rankings from AP Poll,. (#) Tournament seedings in parentheses. All times are in Eastern Time.
