= 2017 Ivy League men's basketball tournament =

- Classification: Division I
- Season: 2016–17
- Teams: 4
- Site: Palestra; Philadelphia, Pennsylvania
- Champions: Princeton (1st title)
- Winning coach: Mitch Henderson (1st title)

2016–17 Ivy League men's basketball standings
	Conf.				Overall
Team	W		L	PCT	W		L	PCT
x-Princeton †	14	–	0	1.000	23	–	7	.767
Harvard	10	–	4	.714	18	–	10	.643
Yale	9	–	5	.643	18	–	11	.621
Penn	6	–	8	.429	13	–	15	.464
Columbia	5	–	9	.357	11	–	16	.407
Brown	4	–	10	.286	13	–	17	.433
Cornell	4	–	10	.286	8	–	21	.276
Dartmouth	4	–	10	.286	7	–	20	.259
† 2017 Ivy League Tournament winner x – Ivy League champions

The 2017 Ivy League men's basketball tournament was a postseason conference tournament for the Ivy League. The tournament was March 11 and 12, 2017, at the Palestra on the campus of the University of Pennsylvania in Philadelphia.

The tournament marked the first postseason tournament held by the Ivy League in men's basketball however the Ivy League continues to recognize the team or teams with the best record following the regular season to be the Ivy League Champion. In the tournament, league champion Princeton defeated Yale in the championship game to win the tournament. As a result, Princeton received the conference's automatic bid to the NCAA tournament.

== Background ==
The Ivy League was the last NCAA Division I conference to hold a postseason tournament, instead choosing to award its automatic bids to the NCAA men's and women's tournaments to its regular-season champions; in the event that two teams finished tied atop the standings, Ivy League bylaws allowed for a one-game playoff to determine the recipient of the automatic bid, and in exceptionally rare cases, a three-team single-elimination tournament would be scheduled if three teams tied atop the standings (the Ivy League never had more than three regular season co-champions in one season). The Ivy League has historically resisted postseason play in all of its sports.

In March 2016, the League announced that it would institute men's and women's conference tournaments beginning with the 2016–17 season. Both tournaments would initially be held at the same site. The conference also reduced by one the number of regular-season games that its members are allowed to schedule.

== Seeds ==
The top four teams in the Ivy League regular-season standings qualified for the tournament and were seeded according to their records in conference play, resulting in a Shaughnessy playoff.

Seed	School	Conf. Record
1	Princeton	14–0
2	Harvard	10–4
3	Yale	9–5
4	Penn	6–8

== Schedule ==
Session	Game	Time*	Matchup	Score	Television	Attendance
Semifinals – Saturday, March 11
1	1	1:30 pm	No. 1 Princeton vs. No. 4 Penn	72–66^{OT}	ESPNU	
1	2	4:00 pm	No. 2 Harvard vs. No. 3 Yale	71–73	ESPNU	
Championship – Sunday, March 12
2	3	12:00 pm	No. 1 Princeton vs. No. 3 Yale	71–59	ESPN2	

*Game times in Eastern Time. Rankings denote tournament seeding.

== Bracket ==
Semifinals; Saturday, March 11
1	Princeton	72*
4	Penn	64
2	Harvard	71
3	Yale	73

Final; Sunday, March 12
1	Princeton	71
3	Yale	59

== All-Tournament team ==
Myles Stephens, Princeton
Steven Cook, Princeton
Sam Downey, Yale
Bryce Aiken, Harvard
Ryan Betley, Penn

== See also ==
- 2017 Ivy League women's basketball tournament
