= 2016–17 Cornell Big Red men's basketball team =

American college basketball season

2016–17 Cornell Big Red men's basketball
- Conference: Ivy League
- Record: 8–21 (4–10 Ivy)
- Head coach: Brian Earl (1st season)
- Assistant coaches: Jon Jaques; Donovan Williams; Adam Gierlach
- Home arena: Newman Arena

2016–17 Ivy League men's basketball standings
	Conf.				Overall
Team	W		L	PCT	W		L	PCT
x-Princeton †	14	–	0	1.000	23	–	7	.767
Harvard	10	–	4	.714	18	–	10	.643
Yale	9	–	5	.643	18	–	11	.621
Penn	6	–	8	.429	13	–	15	.464
Columbia	5	–	9	.357	11	–	16	.407
Brown	4	–	10	.286	13	–	17	.433
Cornell	4	–	10	.286	8	–	21	.276
Dartmouth	4	–	10	.286	7	–	20	.259
† 2017 Ivy League Tournament winner x – Ivy League champions

The 2016–17 Cornell Big Red men's basketball team represented Cornell University during the 2016–17 NCAA Division I men's basketball season. The Big Red, led by first-year head coach Brian Earl, played their home games at Newman Arena in Ithaca, New York and were members of the Ivy League. They finished the season 8–21, 4–10 in Ivy League play to finish in a three-way tie for last place. They failed to qualify for the inaugural Ivy League tournament.

== Previous season ==
The Big Red finished the 2015–16 season 10–18, 3–11 in Ivy League play to finish in a tie for seventh place.

On March 14, 2016, Cornell fired head coach Bill Courtney. He finished at Cornell with a six-year record of 60–113. On April 18, the school hired Brian Earl as head coach.

== Offseason ==
=== Departures ===
Name	Number	Pos.	Height	Weight	Year	Hometown	Notes
Robert Mischler	22	G	6'3"	183	Senior	Mishawaka, IN	Graduated
Xavier Eaglin	34	F	6'7"	205	Freshman	Raywood, TX	Left the team for personal reasons

=== 2016 recruiting class ===
College recruiting information
Name	Hometown	School	Height	Weight	Commit date
Josh Warren #114 PF	Downingtown, PA	Downingtown West High School	6 ft 8 in (2.03 m)	210 lb (95 kg)	Sep 20, 2015
Josh Warren #114 PF	Recruit ratings: Scout: Rivals: (55)				
Overall recruit ranking:
Note: In many cases, Scout, Rivals, 247Sports, On3, and ESPN may conflict in their listings of height and weight.; In these cases, the average was taken. ESPN grades are on a 100-point scale.; Sources: "2016 Team Ranking". Rivals.

=== 2017 recruiting class ===
College recruiting information (2017)
Name	Hometown	School	Height	Weight	Commit date
Jerry Ben; PF	New Haven, MI	New Haven High School	6 ft 9 in (2.06 m)	N/A	Apr 1, 2015
Jerry Ben; PF	Recruit ratings: Scout: Rivals: (NR)				
Jimmy Boeheim; PF	Syracuse, NY	Jamesville-DeWitt High School	6 ft 7 in (2.01 m)	210 lb (95 kg)	Feb 28, 2017
Jimmy Boeheim; PF	Recruit ratings: Scout: Rivals: (57)				
Overall recruit ranking:
Note: In many cases, Scout, Rivals, 247Sports, On3, and ESPN may conflict in their listings of height and weight.; In these cases, the average was taken. ESPN grades are on a 100-point scale.; Sources: "2017 Team Ranking". Rivals.

== Roster ==
2016–17 Cornell Big Red men's basketball team
Players
Coaches

Pos.	#	Name	Height	Weight	Year	Previous school	Hometown
G	0	David Onuorah	6 ft 9 in (2.06 m)	230 lb (104 kg)	Sr	Marist HS	Lithonia, GA
G	1	Darryl Smith	6 ft 2 in (1.88 m)	180 lb (82 kg)	Sr	Blue Ridge School	Chesapeake, VA
F	3	Donovan Wright	6 ft 5 in (1.96 m)	200 lb (91 kg)	So	Blair Academy	Easton, PA
G	4	Troy Whiteside	6 ft 4 in (1.93 m)	185 lb (84 kg)	So	The Webb School	Knoxville, TN
G	5	Robert Hatter	6 ft 2 in (1.88 m)	180 lb (82 kg)	Sr	Westside HS	Houston, TX
G	10	Matt Morgan	6 ft 3 in (1.91 m)	180 lb (82 kg)	So	Cox Mill HS	Concord, NC
G	11	Desmond Fleming	5 ft 11 in (1.8 m)	180 lb (82 kg)	Sr	The Woodlands College Park HS	The Woodlands, TX
F	12	Jordan Abdur-Ra'oof	6 ft 7 in (2.01 m)	205 lb (93 kg)	Jr	Gonzaga College HS	Rockville, MD
F	13	Stone Gettings	6 ft 9 in (2.06 m)	230 lb (104 kg)	So	Loyola HS	Calabasas, CA
C	15	Braxston Bunce	6 ft 11 in (2.11 m)	250 lb (113 kg)	Sr	Kelowna Secondary School	Kelowna, BC
G/F	20	Will Bathurst	6 ft 3 in (1.91 m)	180 lb (82 kg)	Jr	Olean HS	Olean, NY
G	21	Kyle Brown	6 ft 2 in (1.88 m)	180 lb (82 kg)	Jr	Newport HS	Bellevue, WA
F	22	Josh Warren	6 ft 8 in (2.03 m)	223 lb (101 kg)	Fr	Downington West HS	Downingtown, PA
G	23	Joel Davis	6 ft 3 in (1.91 m)	170 lb (77 kg)	So	Wayne Country Day School	Goldsboro, NC
G/F	24	Pat Smith	6 ft 5 in (1.96 m)	195 lb (88 kg)	Jr	Archbishop Wood Catholic HS	Chalfont, PA
G	25	JoJo Fallas	5 ft 11 in (1.8 m)	175 lb (79 kg)	Sr	Shalhevet HS	Los Angeles, CA
F	30	Joseph Bayless	6 ft 8 in (2.03 m)	240 lb (109 kg)	So	Woodrow Wilson HS	Dallas, TX
G	32	Jack Gordon	6 ft 5 in (1.96 m)	185 lb (84 kg)	So	St. Mark's School	Dallas, TX

Head coach

- Brian Earl (Princeton)

Assistant coach(es)

- Jon Jaques (Cornell)
- Donovan Williams (Park)
- Adam Gierlach (Rice)

Legend

- (C) Team captain
- (S) Suspended
- (I) Ineligible
- (W) Walk-on
- Injured
- Current redshirt

Roster

== Schedule and results ==
Date time, TV	Rank^{#}	Opponent^{#}	Result	Record	Site (attendance) city, state
Non-conference regular season
11/11/2016*; 7:00 pm		at Binghamton	L 62–68	0–1	Binghamton University Events Center (3,278); Vestal, NY
11/13/2016*; 2:00 pm		at Siena	L 78–89	0–2	Times Union Center (6,196); Albany, NY
11/16/2016*; 7:00 pm		Colgate	L 63–67	0–3	Newman Arena (1,328); Ithaca, NY
11/20/2016*; 2:00 pm		at Lafayette	W 82–75	1–3	Kirby Sports Center (1,821); Easton, PA
11/22/2016*; 7:00 pm		at Monmouth	L 61–76	1–4	OceanFirst Bank Center (2,215); West Long Branch, NJ
11/26/2016*; 8:00 pm, ESPN3		at Houston	L 53–83	1–5	Hofheinz Pavilion (3,223); Houston, TX
11/30/2016*; 7:00 pm		Northeastern	W 80–77	2–5	Newman Arena (742); Ithaca, NY
12/17/2016*; 6:00 pm		at Wyoming; Las Vegas Classic	L 78–97	2–6	Arena-Auditorium (3,929); Laramie, WY
12/19/2016*; 10:30 pm, P12N		at No. 23 USC; Las Vegas Classic	L 67–79	2–7	Galen Center (4,148); Los Angeles, CA
12/22/2016*; 5:30 pm		vs. Troy; Las Vegas Classic semifinals	L 84–92	2–8	Orleans Arena; Paradise, NV
12/23/2016*; 5:30 pm		vs. Southeast Missouri State; Las Vegas Classic	W 78–62	3–8	Orleans Arena; Paradise, NV
12/27/2016*; 7:00 pm, RSN		at Syracuse	L 56–80	3–9	Carrier Dome (20,057); Syracuse, NY
12/29/2016*; 6:00 pm		UMass Lowell	L 96–98 ^{OT}	3–10	Newman Arena (422); Ithaca, NY
01/02/2017*; 7:00 pm, ESPN3		at Albany	L 59–69	3–11	SEFCU Arena (2,430); Albany, NY
01/08/2017*; 2:00 pm		Fisher	W 100–72	4–11	Newman Arena (357); Ithaca, NY
Ivy League regular season
01/14/2017; 4:00 pm		Columbia	L 75–79	4–12 (0–1)	Newman Arena (2,437); Ithaca, NY
01/21/2017; 7:00 pm		at Columbia	W 67–62	5–12 (1–1)	Levien Gymnasium (2,220); New York City, NY
01/27/2017; 7:00 pm		Harvard	L 71–77	5–13 (1–2)	Newman Arena (1,186); Ithaca, NY
01/28/2017; 6:00 pm		Dartmouth	W 75–62	6–13 (2–2)	Newman Arena (3,103); Ithaca, NY
02/03/2017; 7:00 pm		Brown	L 70–81	6–14 (2–3)	Newman Arena (1,153); Ithaca, NY
02/04/2017; 6:00 pm		Yale	L 71–78	6–15 (2–4)	Newman Arena (875); Ithaca, NY
02/10/2017; 7:00 pm, ESPN3		at Princeton	L 60–69	6–16 (2–5)	Jadwin Gymnasium (2,012); Princeton, NJ
02/12/2017; 1:00 pm		at Penn	L 63–82	6–17 (2–6)	Palestra (4,190); Philadelphia, PA
02/17/2017; 7:00 pm		at Dartmouth	W 69–65	7–17 (3–6)	Leede Arena (621); Hanover, NH
02/18/2017; 7:00 pm		at Harvard	L 75–87	7–18 (3–7)	Lavietes Pavilion (1,979); Cambridge, MA
02/24/2017; 7:00 pm		Penn	L 66–69	7–19 (3–8)	Newman Arena (1,008); Ithaca, NY
02/25/2017; 6:00 pm, ESPN3		Princeton	L 60–75	7–20 (3–9)	Newman Arena (1,381); Ithaca, NY
03/03/2017; 7:00 pm, ESPN3		at Yale	L 63–90	7–21 (3–10)	John J. Lee Amphitheater (1,411); New Haven, CT
03/04/2017; 6:00 pm		at Brown	W 92–78	8–21 (4–10)	Pizzitola Sports Center (902); Providence, RI
*Non-conference game. ^{#}Rankings from AP Poll. (#) Tournament seedings in parentheses. All times are in Eastern Time. Source
