= Spencer Weisz =

American-Israeli basketball player (born 1995)

Spencer Weisz ספנסר וייס
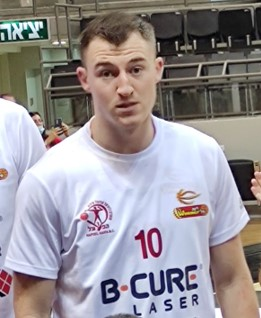

No. 10 – Ironi Ness Ziona
- Position: Shooting guard / small forward
- League: Israeli Basketball Premier League

Personal information
- Born: May 31, 1995 (age 31) Florham Park, New Jersey, U.S.
- Listed height: 6 ft 4 in (1.93 m)
- Listed weight: 210 lb (95 kg)

Career information
- High school: Seton Hall Prep (West Orange, New Jersey)
- College: Princeton (2013–2017)
- NBA draft: 2017: undrafted
- Playing career: 2017–present

Career history
- 2017–2018: Hapoel Gilboa Galil
- 2018–2019: Maccabi Ashdod
- 2019–2021: Hapoel Be'er Sheva
- 2021–2023: Hapoel Haifa
- 2023–2024: Hapoel Afula
- 2024–2025: Hapoel Be'er Sheva
- 2025–present: Ironi Ness Ziona

Career highlights
- AP Honorable Mention All-American (2017); Ivy League Player of the Year (2017); First-team All-Ivy League (2017); Second-team NABC All-District 13 (2017); 2× Second-team All-Ivy League (2015, 2016); Ivy League Rookie of the Year (2014); Maccabiah Games U-18 MVP (2013)
Medals
Men's basketball
Representing United States
Maccabiah Games U18 Championship
Gold medal – first place	2013 Jerusalem	National team

Spencer Weisz (Hebrew: ספנסר וייס; born May 31, 1995) is an American-Israeli professional basketball player for Ironi Ness Ziona of the Israeli Basketball Premier League. He played college basketball for the Princeton Tigers, completing his college career in the 2016–17 season.

Playing for gold medal-winning Team USA, Weisz was the Most Valuable Player of the Under-18 basketball competition in the 2013 Maccabiah Games. He earned the 2014 Ivy League Men's Basketball Rookie of the Year Award and the 2017 Ivy League Men's Basketball Player of the Year Award, and was a 3-time first or second team All-Ivy selection. During the summer of 2015, he was a member of the Israel national under-20 basketball team at the 2015 FIBA U-20 European Championship. Weisz has played for a number of Israeli clubs, while capturing back-to-back league steals titles in 2024–25 and 2025–26.

== Early life ==
Weisz is a native of Florham Park, New Jersey, and is Jewish. He attended Seton Hall Prep. As a junior, he was first-team All-County. As a senior, The Star-Ledger recognized Weisz as a second-team All-State selection in New Jersey and the Essex County, New Jersey boys' basketball Player of the Year.

== College career ==
Playing for Princeton University, Weisz earned the 2014 Ivy League Men's Basketball Rookie of the Year. On December 7, 2013, he posted his first career double-double with 17 points (including 3-for-3 on three-point field goals) and 10 rebounds against Fairleigh Dickinson. He earned second-team All-Ivy League recognition in 2015 and 2016. As a sophomore, in 2014–15, he was 6th in the Ivy League in 3-point field goal percentage (.408), 7th in 3-point field goals (51), and 8th in scoring (11.6).

As a junior, he served as a tri-captain (along with Mike Washington Jr. and Steven Cook) of the 2015–16 team. He led the Ivy League in assist-to-turnover ratio (2.8), and was 2nd in the league in assists-per-game (3.9), 4th in assists (113), 6th in 3-point field goals (63) and free throw shooting percentage (80.9%), and 8th in defensive rebounds (129).

Going into his senior year, The Sporting News projected him as Ivy League first team, and Lindy's projected him as Ivy League second team. As a senior, Weisz led Princeton in rebounds, assists (4.2 per game; 125; 2nd in the league), and steals (1.5 per game; 46; 2nd in the Ivy League), while coming in 2nd in the league in assist-to-turnover ratio (2.6), 5th in 3-point field goals (61) and defensive rebounds (137), and 10th in total rebounds (161). In December 2016, he tied the Princeton single-game record for assists in a game, with 13 against Liberty. He posted his career high of 26 points in a February 3, 2017, 69–64 victory over Dartmouth. He served again as a co-captain, and earned Ivy League Men's Basketball Player of the Year recognition. He became the 8th player in Ivy League history to win both the league's Rookie of the Year Award and Player of the Year Award. He was one of two unanimous first-team All-Ivy selections, despite only ranking fourth on Princeton in scoring average. Weisz was included on the National Association of Basketball Coaches Division I All‐District 13 second-team, earned honorable mention on the Associated Press All-America team, and was named to the Jewish Sports Review 2016–17 Men's College Basketball All-American First Team. The 2016–17 Princeton Tigers earned Princeton its first NCAA Division I men's basketball tournament invitation since the 2010–11 team did so.

He became the only player in Princeton career history to amass 1,000 points, 500 rebounds, 300 assists, and 200 3-pointers. He ended his college career 2nd in Princeton history in assists (383), 5th in 3-pointers (209), and 12th in scoring (1,241 points). His 511 career defensive rebounds were 5th in Ivy League history.

== Professional career ==
=== Hapoel Gilboa Galil (2017–2018) ===
On August 3, 2017, Weisz started his professional career with Hapoel Gilboa Galil of the Israeli Basketball Premier League, signing a one-year deal with an option for another one. Weisz helped Gilboa Galil reach the 2018 Israeli League Playoffs, where they eventually lost to Hapoel Jerusalem in the Quarterfinals. In 2017-18, playing in 35 games, he averaged 14.7 minutes, 2.5 points, 2.7 rebounds, and 0.9 assists per game, while shooting 80.0% from the free throw line.

=== Maccabi Ashdod (2018–2019) ===
On July 19, 2018, Weisz signed with Maccabi Ashdod for the 2018–19 season. On April 10, 2019, Weisz recorded a career-high 27 points, shooting 6-of-9 from three-point range, along with eight rebounds, six assists and three steals, leading Ashdod to a 94–86 win over his former team Hapoel Gilboa Galil. In 26 games played for Ashdod in 2018-19, he averaged 29.7 minutes, 9.0 points, 3.9 rebounds, 3.7 assists, and 2.1 steals per game.

=== Hapoel Be'er Sheva (2019–2021) ===
On June 21, 2019, Weisz signed a two-year deal with Hapoel Be'er Sheva. Two months later, he was named Be'er Sheva's new team captain, replacing Chanan Colman. On October 21, 2019, Weisz recorded a season-high 21 points, shooting 5-of-8 from three-point range, along with eight assists, scoring the last 13 out of 15 points to give Be'er Sheva an 88–87 win over Hapoel Eilat. In 2019-20, playing in 28 games, he averaged 30.9 minutes, 11.2 points, 5.6 rebounds, 3.1 assists, and 1.6 steals per game.

In 2020–21, in 35 games he averaged 28.8 minutes, 12.1 points, 5.4 rebounds, 3.5 assists, and 1.6 steals (7th in the league) per game. He was 3rd in the league in steals, with 48, and 8th in three-point field goal percentage at .356. He was voted Eurobasket All-Israeli League Honorable Mention.

=== Hapoel Haifa (2021–2024) ===
On July 6, 2021, Weisz signed with Hapoel Haifa in the Israeli Basketball Premier League. In 2021-22, playing in 32 games, he averaged 24.9 minutes, 6.2 points, 3.6 rebounds, 1.9 assists, and 1.2 steals per game.

In 2022-23, playing in 32 games, he averaged 21.6 minutes, 4.5 points, 3.7 rebounds, and 1.9 assists per game.

In 2023-24, playing in 32 games, he averaged 32.9 minutes, 10.6 points, 6.5 rebounds, a career-high 4.0 assists, and 2.0 steals per game.

=== Return to Hapoel Beer Sheva (2024–2025) ===
In 2024-25, playing in 25 games for Hapoel Beer Sheva, he averaged 32.5 minutes, 10.5 points, 6.8 rebounds, 3.6 assists, and a career-high 2.3 steals (leading the league) per game.

=== Ironi Ness Ziona (2025–present) ===
In 2025-26, playing in 33 games forIroni Ness Ziona of the Israeli Basketball Premier League, he averaged 31.9 minutes, 9.1 points, 6.8 rebounds (7th in the league), 3.3 assists, and 1.9 steals per game (leading the league).

In the 2026-27 season, Weisz is again playing for Ironi Ness Ziona.

== International play ==
Weisz was a member of the Under-18 US National team that won the 2013 Maccabiah Games gold medal, along with future NFL player Anthony Firkser, and earned the Most Valuable Player recognition for the tournament. In the final, gold medal game against Team Israel, Weisz scored 19 points, brought down 12 rebounds, and had 11 assists.

During the summer of 2015, Weisz was a starter for the Israel national under-20 basketball team at the 2015 FIBA U-20 European Championship, where Israel finished 10th out of 20 teams.

== See also ==
- List of select Jewish basketball players
