= 2016–17 Brown Bears men's basketball team =

American college basketball season

2016–17 Brown Bears men's basketball
- Conference: Ivy League
- Record: 13–17 (4–10 Ivy)
- Head coach: Mike Martin (5th season)
- Assistant coaches: Dwayne Pina; Tyler Simms; John Linehan
- Home arena: Pizzitola Sports Center

2016–17 Ivy League men's basketball standings
	Conf.				Overall
Team	W		L	PCT	W		L	PCT
x-Princeton †	14	–	0	1.000	23	–	7	.767
Harvard	10	–	4	.714	18	–	10	.643
Yale	9	–	5	.643	18	–	11	.621
Penn	6	–	8	.429	13	–	15	.464
Columbia	5	–	9	.357	11	–	16	.407
Brown	4	–	10	.286	13	–	17	.433
Cornell	4	–	10	.286	8	–	21	.276
Dartmouth	4	–	10	.286	7	–	20	.259
† 2017 Ivy League Tournament winner x – Ivy League champions

The 2016–17 Brown Bears men's basketball team represented Brown University during the 2016–17 NCAA Division I men's basketball season. The Bears, led by fifth-year head coach Mike Martin, played their home games at the Pizzitola Sports Center and were members of the Ivy League. They finished the season 13–17, 4–10 in Ivy League play to finish in a three-way tie for last place. They failed to qualify for the inaugural Ivy League tournament.

== Previous season ==
The Bears finished the 2015–16 season 8–20, 3–11 in Ivy League play to finish in a tie for seventh place.

== Offseason ==
=== Departures ===
Name	Number	Pos.	Height	Weight	Year	Hometown	Notes
Justin Massey	2	G	6'3"	190	Sophomore	Cooper City, FL	Transferred to Florida Atlantic
Joe Sharkey	11	G	6'2"	190	Senior	Norwood, MA	Graduated
Aram Martin	20	F	6'10"	200	Sophomore	San Antonio, TX	Left the team for personal reasons
Cedric Kuakumensah	21	F	6'9"	245	Senior	Worcester, MA	Graduated
Jason Massey	25	G	6'4"	205	Sophomore	Cooper City, FL	Transferred to Florida Atlantic

=== 2016 recruiting class ===
College recruiting information
Name	Hometown	School	Height	Weight	Commit date
David Erebor #69 C	Baltimore, MD	Our Lady of Mt. Carmel High School	6 ft 9 in (2.06 m)	215 lb (98 kg)	Sep 23, 2015
David Erebor #69 C	Recruit ratings: Scout: Rivals: (61)				
Brandon Anderson #78 PG	Mahwah, NJ	Don Bosco High School	6 ft 0 in (1.83 m)	160 lb (73 kg)	Aug 1, 2015
Brandon Anderson #78 PG	Recruit ratings: Scout: Rivals: (60)				
Joshua Howard; PF	Charlotte, NC	Providence Day School	6 ft 6 in (1.98 m)	170 lb (77 kg)	Mar 19, 2016
Joshua Howard; PF	Recruit ratings: Scout: Rivals: (60)				
Overall recruit ranking:
Note: In many cases, Scout, Rivals, 247Sports, On3, and ESPN may conflict in their listings of height and weight.; In these cases, the average was taken. ESPN grades are on a 100-point scale.; Sources: "2016 Team Ranking". Rivals.

=== 2017 recruiting class ===
College recruiting information (2017)
Name	Hometown	School	Height	Weight	Commit date
Tamenang Choh; SF	North Andover, MA	Brooks School	6 ft 5 in (1.96 m)	200 lb (91 kg)	Aug 25, 2016
Tamenang Choh; SF	Recruit ratings: Scout: Rivals: (NR)				
Overall recruit ranking:
Note: In many cases, Scout, Rivals, 247Sports, On3, and ESPN may conflict in their listings of height and weight.; In these cases, the average was taken. ESPN grades are on a 100-point scale.; Sources: "2017 Team Ranking". Rivals.

== Roster ==
2016–17 Brown Bears men's basketball team
Players
Coaches

Pos.	#	Name	Height	Weight	Year	Previous school	Hometown
F	1	Travis Fuller	6 ft 9 in (2.06 m)	215 lb (98 kg)	So	La Costa Canyon	Encinitas, CA
G	2	Brandon Anderson	6 ft 1 in (1.85 m)	170 lb (77 kg)	Fr	Don Bosco Prep	Mahwah, NJ
G	3	Steven Spieth	6 ft 6 in (1.98 m)	200 lb (91 kg)	Sr	The Miller School of Albemarle	San Antonio, TX
G	4	Obi Okolie	6 ft 5 in (1.96 m)	195 lb (88 kg)	So	Archbishop Denis O'Connor	Ajax, ON
G	5	Tavon Blackmon	6 ft 0 in (1.83 m)	180 lb (82 kg)	Sr	Gonzaga College	Upper Marlboro, MD
F	10	David Erebor	6 ft 9 in (2.06 m)	230 lb (104 kg)	Fr	Our Lady of Carmel School	Sykesville, MD
G	11	Chris Sullivan	6 ft 3 in (1.91 m)	170 lb (77 kg)	So	Northfield Mt. Hermon	Wilmette, IL
G	12	JR Hobbie	6 ft 4 in (1.93 m)	190 lb (86 kg)	Sr	Manasquan	Spring Lake, NJ
G	13	Patrick Triplett	6 ft 4 in (1.93 m)	195 lb (88 kg)	Jr	Bayless	St. Louis, MO
G	22	Corey Daugherty	6 ft 1 in (1.85 m)	165 lb (75 kg)	So	Barrington	Barrington, RI
F	23	Blake Wilkinson	6 ft 7 in (2.01 m)	235 lb (107 kg)	Sr	Viewmont; Salt Lake CC	Bountiful, UT
F	24	Kyle Haber	6 ft 6 in (1.98 m)	190 lb (86 kg)	Jr	Dubuque Senior	Dubuque, IA
F	25	Joshua Howard	6 ft 6 in (1.98 m)	200 lb (91 kg)	Fr	Providence Day School	Charlotte, NC
F	30	Miki Ljuboja	6 ft 8 in (2.03 m)	225 lb (102 kg)	Jr	Phillips Exeter Academy	North Riverside, IL
C	34	Brandon Charnov	6 ft 11 in (2.11 m)	250 lb (113 kg)	Fr	Kinkaid	Houston, TX

Head coach

- Mike Martin (Brown)

Assistant coach(es)

- Dwayne Pina (Boston College)
- Tyler Simms (Trinity (CT))
- John Linehan (Providence)

Legend

- (C) Team captain
- (S) Suspended
- (I) Ineligible
- (W) Walk-on
- Injured
- Current redshirt

Roster

== Schedule and results ==
Date time, TV	Rank^{#}	Opponent^{#}	Result	Record	Site (attendance) city, state
Non-conference regular season
11/11/2016*; 7:00 pm, ESPN3		at Cincinnati; Hall of Fame Tip Off	L 55–84	0–1	Fifth Third Arena (6,504); Cincinnati, OH
11/13/2016*; 3:00 pm		Niagara	W 88–79	1–1	Pizzitola Sports Center (757); Providence, RI
11/16/2016*; 7:00 pm		at No. 21 Rhode Island; Hall of Fame Tip Off/Ocean State Cup	L 72–79	1–2	Ryan Center (5,630); Kingston, RI
11/19/2016*; 5:30 pm, ESPN3		vs. Marist; Hall of Fame Tip Off	L 79–87	1–3	Mohegan Sun Arena; Uncasville, CT
11/20/2016*; 8:00 pm, ESPN3		vs. Albany; Hall of Fame Tip Off	L 76–80	1–4	Mohegan Sun Arena (9,119); Uncasville, CT
11/23/2016*; 4:00 pm		Morgan State	W 81–75	2–4	Pizzitola Sports Center (487); Providence, RI
11/28/2016*; 7:00 pm		Bryant; Ocean State Cup	W 91–90	3–4	Pizzitola Sports Center (636); Providence, RI
11/30/2016*; 7:00 pm		St. Francis Brooklyn	W 71–61	4–4	Pizzitola Sports Center (529); Providence, RI
12/03/2016*; 1:00 pm		at Central Connecticut	W 75–58	5–4	William H. Detrick Gymnasium (1,748); New Britain, CT
12/06/2016*; 7:00 pm, FS2		at Providence; Ocean State Cup	L 57–95	5–5	Dunkin' Donuts Center (4,869); Providence, RI
12/09/2016*; 7:00 pm		Emerson	W 90–58	6–5	Pizzitola Sports Center (327); Providence, RI
12/10/2016*; 7:00 pm		Johnson & Whales (RI)	W 89–59	7–5	Pizzitola Sports Center (464); Providence, RI
12/22/2016*; 3:30 pm		Maine	W 82–77	8–5	Pizzitola Sports Center (650); Providence, RI
12/29/2016*; 7:00 pm		Quinnipiac	W 66–61	9–5	Pizzitola Sports Center (622); Providence, RI
12/31/2016*; 2:00 pm		Stony Brook	L 89–92	9–6	Pizzitola Sports Center (617); Providence, RI
01/04/2017*; 7:00 pm, ESPN3		at NJIT	L 73–75	9–7	Fleisher Center (475); Newark, NJ
Ivy League regular season
01/13/2017; 8:00 pm		at Princeton	L 66–97	9–8 (0–1)	Jadwin Gymnasium (1,735); Princeton, NJ
01/14/2017; 8:00 pm		at Penn	W 82–70	10–8 (1–1)	Palestra (2,843); Philadelphia, PA
01/20/2017; 8:00 pm, ESPN3		Yale	L 74–75	10–9 (1–2)	Pizzitola Sports Center (1,217); Providence, RI
01/27/2017; 8:00 pm		at Yale	L 75–85	10–10 (1–3)	John J. Lee Amphitheater (1,673); New Haven, CT
02/03/2017; 7:00 pm		at Cornell	W 81–70	11–10 (2–3)	Newman Arena (1,153); Ithaca, NY
02/04/2017; 7:00 pm, OWS		at Columbia	L 78–83	11–11 (2–4)	Levien Gymnasium (1,843); New York City, NY
02/10/2017; 7:00 pm, ESPN3		Harvard	L 74–87	11–12 (2–5)	Pizzitola Sports Center (1,581); Providence, RI
02/11/2017; 6:00 pm		Dartmouth	L 74–77	11–13 (2–6)	Pizzitola Sports Center (1,104); Providence, RI
02/17/2017; 8:00 pm, ESPN3		Penn	L 69–72	11–14 (2–7)	Pizzitola Sports Center (1,113); Providence, RI
02/18/2017; 7:00 pm, ESPN3		Princeton	L 51–66	11–15 (2–8)	Pizzitola Sports Center (1,498); Providence, RI
02/24/2017; 7:00 pm		at Dartmouth	W 80–75	12–15 (3–8)	Leede Arena (608); Hanover, NH
02/25/2017; 7:00 pm		at Harvard	L 58–77	12–16 (3–9)	Lavietes Pavilion (608); Cambridge, MA
03/03/2017; 7:00 pm, ESPN3		Columbia	W 88–68	13–16 (4–9)	Pizzitola Sports Center (702); Providence, RI
03/04/2017; 6:00 pm		Cornell	L 78–92	13–17 (4–10)	Pizzitola Sports Center (902); Providence, RI
*Non-conference game. ^{#}Rankings from AP Poll. (#) Tournament seedings in parentheses. All times are in Eastern Time.
