= 2016–17 Penn Quakers men's basketball team =

American college basketball season

2016–17 Penn Quakers men's basketball
- Conference: Ivy League
- Record: 13–15 (6–8 Ivy)
- Head coach: Steve Donahue (2nd season)
- Assistant coaches: Nat Graham; Ira Bowman; Joe Mihalich, Jr.
- Home arena: The Palestra

2016–17 Ivy League men's basketball standings
	Conf.				Overall
Team	W		L	PCT	W		L	PCT
x-Princeton †	14	–	0	1.000	23	–	7	.767
Harvard	10	–	4	.714	18	–	10	.643
Yale	9	–	5	.643	18	–	11	.621
Penn	6	–	8	.429	13	–	15	.464
Columbia	5	–	9	.357	11	–	16	.407
Brown	4	–	10	.286	13	–	17	.433
Cornell	4	–	10	.286	8	–	21	.276
Dartmouth	4	–	10	.286	7	–	20	.259
† 2017 Ivy League Tournament winner x – Ivy League champions

The 2016–17 Penn Quakers men's basketball team represented the University of Pennsylvania during the 2016–17 NCAA Division I men's basketball season. The Quakers, led by second-year head coach Steve Donahue, played their home games at The Palestra and were members of the Ivy League. They finished the season 13–15, 6–8 in Ivy League play to finish in fourth place. They lost in the semifinals of the inaugural Ivy League tournament to Princeton.

== Previous season ==
The Quakers finished the 2015–16 season 11–17, 5–9 in Ivy League play to finish in fifth place.

== Offseason ==
=== Departures ===
Name	Number	Pos.	Height	Weight	Year	Hometown	Notes
Jamal Lewis	4	G	6'0"	160	Senior	Springdale, MD	Graduated
Darien Nelson-Henry	10	C	6'10"	265	Senior	Kirkland, WA	Graduated
Matt Poplawski	21	G	5'10"	165	Junior	Bellevue, WA	Left the team for personal reasons
Mike Auger	22	F	6'7"	225	Sophomore	Hopkinton, NH	Left the team for personal reasons

=== Incoming transfers ===
Name	Number	Pos.	Height	Weight	Year	Hometown	Previous School
Caleb Wood	10	G	6'4"	180	Junior	Reno, NV	Junior college transferred from Lassen CC

=== 2016 recruiting class ===
College recruiting
Name	Hometown	School	Height	Weight	Commit date
A. J. Brodeur #49 PF	Northborough, MA	Northfield-Mt. Hermon School	6 ft 8 in (2.03 m)	215 lb (98 kg)	
A. J. Brodeur #49 PF	Recruit ratings: Scout: Rivals: (76)				
Ryan Betley #85 SG	Downingtown, PA	Downingtown West High School	6 ft 4 in (1.93 m)	170 lb (77 kg)	Jul 14, 2015
Ryan Betley #85 SG	Recruit ratings: Scout: Rivals: (62)				
Ray Jerome #87 SG	Latham, NY	Cheshire Academy	6 ft 3 in (1.91 m)	185 lb (84 kg)	Oct 17, 2015
Ray Jerome #87 SG	Recruit ratings: Scout: Rivals: (60)				
Devon Goodman #122 PG	Philadelphia, PA	Germantown Academy	5 ft 11 in (1.80 m)	150 lb (68 kg)	Oct 2, 2015
Devon Goodman #122 PG	Recruit ratings: Scout: Rivals: (56)				
Overall recruit ranking:
Note: In many cases, Scout, Rivals, 247Sports, On3, and ESPN may conflict in their listings of height and weight.; In these cases, the average was taken. ESPN grades are on a 100-point scale.; Sources: "2016 Team Ranking". Rivals.

=== 2017 recruiting class ===
College recruiting (2017)
Name	Hometown	School	Height	Weight	Commit date
Jordan Salzman; PG	Locust Valley, NY	Locust Valley High School	5 ft 10 in (1.78 m)	150 lb (68 kg)	Mar 2, 2015
Jordan Salzman; PG	Recruit ratings: Scout: Rivals: (NR)				
Eddie Scott; SF	Bowie, MD	Gonzaga College High School	6 ft 6 in (1.98 m)	195 lb (88 kg)	Jul 29, 2016
Eddie Scott; SF	Recruit ratings: Scout: Rivals: (NR)				
Jelani Willams; SG	Washington, DC	Sidwell Friends School	6 ft 5 in (1.96 m)	185 lb (84 kg)	Sep 4, 2016
Jelani Willams; SG	Recruit ratings: Scout: Rivals: (NR)				
Overall recruit ranking:
Note: In many cases, Scout, Rivals, 247Sports, On3, and ESPN may conflict in their listings of height and weight.; In these cases, the average was taken. ESPN grades are on a 100-point scale.; Sources: "2017 Team Ranking". Rivals.

== Roster ==
2016–17 Penn Quakers men's basketball team
Players
Coaches

Pos.	#	Name	Height	Weight	Year	Previous school	Hometown
F	0	Max Rothschild	6 ft 8 in (2.03 m)	215 lb (98 kg)	So	New Hampton	Chicago, IL
G	1	Ray Jerome	6 ft 2 in (1.88 m)	200 lb (91 kg)	Fr	Cheshire Academy	Latham, NY
G	3	Jake Silpe	6 ft 2 in (1.88 m)	185 lb (84 kg)	Fr	Cherry Hill East	Cherry Hill, NJ
G	4	Darnell Foreman	6 ft 1 in (1.85 m)	175 lb (79 kg)	Jr	Pitman	Camden, NJ
G	5	Jackson Donahue	6 ft 0 in (1.83 m)	175 lb (79 kg)	So	Northfield Mount Hermon	Pawcatuck, CT
G	10	Caleb Wood	6 ft 4 in (1.93 m)	180 lb (82 kg)	Jr	Galena; Lassen CC	Reno, NV
G	11	Tyler Hamilton	6 ft 4 in (1.93 m)	195 lb (88 kg)	So	Cheshire Academy	Atlanta, GA
G	12	Devon Goodman	6 ft 0 in (1.83 m)	160 lb (73 kg)	Fr	Germantown Academy	Laverock, PA
F	13	Dylan Jones	6 ft 8 in (2.03 m)	215 lb (98 kg)	Sr	The Village School	Houston, TX
F	14	Sam Jones	6 ft 7 in (2.01 m)	175 lb (79 kg)	Jr	Gilbert Christian	Gilbert, AZ
F	15	Zack Kaminsky	6 ft 6 in (1.98 m)	215 lb (98 kg)	Fr	Pace Academy	Atlanta, GA
G	20	Matt MacDonald	6 ft 5 in (1.96 m)	200 lb (91 kg)	RS Jr	Canisius; Fairleigh Dickinson	Eggertsville, NY
G	21	Ryan Betley	6 ft 5 in (1.96 m)	185 lb (84 kg)	Fr	Downington West	Downingtown, PA
F	22	Jakub Mijakowski	6 ft 7 in (2.01 m)	215 lb (98 kg)	Fr	Mountain Mission School	Warsaw, Poland
G	23	Shawn Simmons	6 ft 4 in (1.93 m)	170 lb (77 kg)	Jr	Norfolk Academy	Virginia Beach, VA
G	24	Matt Howard	6 ft 4 in (1.93 m)	185 lb (84 kg)	Sr	A.C. Flora	Columbia, SC
F	25	A. J. Brodeur	6 ft 8 in (2.03 m)	225 lb (102 kg)	Fr	Northfield Mount Hermon	Northborough, MA
F	40	Dan Dwyer	6 ft 8 in (2.03 m)	225 lb (102 kg)	Jr	Fenwick	River Forest, IL
C	44	Collin McManus	6 ft 10 in (2.08 m)	230 lb (104 kg)	So	Northfield Mount Hermon	Bedford, NH

Head coach

- Steve Donahue (Ursinus)

Assistant coach(es)

- Nat Graham (Penn)
- Ira Bowman (Penn)
- Joe Mihalich, Jr. (Nazareth)

Legend

- (C) Team captain
- (S) Suspended
- (I) Ineligible
- (W) Walk-on
- Injured
- Current redshirt

Roster

== Schedule and results ==
Date time, TV	Rank^{#}	Opponent^{#}	Result	Record	Site (attendance) city, state
Regular season
11/11/2016*; 7:00 pm		at Robert Morris	W 67–50	1–0	Charles L. Sewall Center (1,691); Moon Township, PA
11/19/2016*; 4:00 pm, ACCN Extra		at Miami (FL)	L 62–74	1–1	BankUnited Center (6,753); Coral Gables, FL
11/22/2016*; 7:00 pm		at Central Connecticut	W 87–65	2–1	William H. Detrick Gymnasium (1,164); New Britain, CT
11/26/2016*; 2:00 pm		at Navy	L 68–70	2–2	Alumni Hall (787); Annapolis, MD
11/29/2016*; 7:00 pm, CSN		No. 2 Villanova; Philadelphia Big 5	L 57–82	2–3	Palestra (7,787); Philadelphia, PA
12/03/2016*; 4:00 pm, ASN		at Temple; Philadelphia Big 5	L 62–70	2–4	Liacouras Center; Philadelphia, PA
12/07/2016*; 8:00 pm		Lafayette	W 81–52	3–4	Palestra (1,677); Philadelphia, PA
12/10/2016*; 2:00 pm, ESPN3		George Mason	L 60–79	3–5	Palestra (2,273); Philadelphia, PA
12/12/2016*; 7:00 pm, ESPN3		at UCF	W 58–49	4–5	CFE Arena (3,088); Orlando, FL
12/28/2016*; 4:00 pm, TCN		Drexel; Battle of 33rd Street	W 75–67	5–5	Palestra (3,386); Philadelphia, PA
12/30/2016*; 4:00 pm		Fairfield	W 74–68	6–5	Palestra (2,304); Philadelphia, PA
01/07/2017; 5:00 pm		at Princeton; Rivalry	L 52–61	6–6 (0–1)	Jadwin Gymnasium (2,814); Princeton, NJ
01/13/2017; 8:00 pm		Yale	L 60–68	6–7 (0–2)	Palestra (2,903); Philadelphia, PA
01/14/2017; 8:00 pm		Brown	L 70–82	6–8 (0–3)	Palestra (2,843); Philadelphia, PA
01/21/2017*; 7:00 pm		Saint Joseph's; Philadelphia Big 5	L 71–78	6–9	Palestra (8,590); Philadelphia, PA
01/25/2017*; 7:00 pm		at La Salle; Philadelphia Big 5	W 77–74	7–9	Tom Gola Arena (1,984); Philadelphia, PA
02/03/2017; 7:00 pm		at Harvard	L 59–69	7–10 (0–4)	Lavietes Pavilion (2,195); Cambridge, MA
02/04/2017; 7:00 pm		at Dartmouth	L 71–74	7–11 (0–5)	Leede Arena (951); Hanover, NH
02/07/2017; 7:00 pm		Princeton; Rivalry	L 49–64	7–12 (0–6)	Palestra (6,215); Philadelphia, PA
02/10/2017; 7:00 pm, ESPN3		Columbia	W 70–62	8–12 (1–6)	Palestra (3,890); Philadelphia, PA
02/12/2017; 1:00 pm, ASN		Cornell	W 82–63	9–12 (2–6)	Palestra (4,190); Philadelphia, PA
02/17/2017; 8:00 pm, ESPN3		at Brown	W 96–72	10–12 (3–6)	Pizzitola Sports Center; Providence, RI
02/19/2017; 1:00 pm, ASN		at Yale	W 71–55	11–12 (4–6)	Payne Whitney Gymnasium (1,567); New Haven, CT
02/24/2017; 7:00 pm		at Cornell	W 69–66	12–12 (5–6)	Newman Arena (1,008); Ithaca, NY
02/25/2017; 7:00 pm, ESPN3		at Columbia	L 67–70	12–13 (5–7)	Levien Gymnasium (2,544); New York City, NY
03/03/2017; 7:00 pm, ONEWS		Dartmouth	L 74–76	12–14 (5–8)	Palestra (2,326); Philadelphia, PA
03/04/2017; 7:00 pm		Harvard	W 75–72	13–14 (6–8)	Palestra (4,451); Philadelphia, PA
Ivy League tournament
03/11/2017; 1:30 pm, ESPNU	(4)	vs. (1) Princeton; Semifinals	L 64–72 ^{OT}	13–15	Palestra; Philadelphia, PA
*Non-conference game. ^{#}Rankings from AP Poll. (#) Tournament seedings in parentheses. All times are in Eastern Time.
