= 2016–17 Yale Bulldogs men's basketball team =

American college basketball season

2016–17 Yale Bulldogs men's basketball
- Conference: Ivy League
- Record: 18–11 (9–5 Ivy)
- Head coach: James Jones (18th season)
- Assistant coaches: Matt Kingsley; Justin Simon; Anthony Goins
- Home arena: John J. Lee Amphitheater

2016–17 Ivy League men's basketball standings
	Conf.				Overall
Team	W		L	PCT	W		L	PCT
x-Princeton †	14	–	0	1.000	23	–	7	.767
Harvard	10	–	4	.714	18	–	10	.643
Yale	9	–	5	.643	18	–	11	.621
Penn	6	–	8	.429	13	–	15	.464
Columbia	5	–	9	.357	11	–	16	.407
Brown	4	–	10	.286	13	–	17	.433
Cornell	4	–	10	.286	8	–	21	.276
Dartmouth	4	–	10	.286	7	–	20	.259
† 2017 Ivy League Tournament winner x – Ivy League champions

The 2016–17 Yale Bulldogs men's basketball team represented Yale University during the 2016–17 NCAA Division I men's basketball season. The Bulldogs, led by 18th-year head coach James Jones, played their home games at John J. Lee Amphitheater of the Payne Whitney Gymnasium in New Haven, Connecticut and were members of the Ivy League. They finished the season 18–11, 10–4 in Ivy League play, to finish in third place. In the inaugural Ivy League tournament, they defeated Harvard before losing to Princeton in the championship game.

== Previous season ==
The Bulldogs finished the 2015–16 season 23–7, 13–1 in Ivy League play, to win the Ivy League championship. They received the Ivy's automatic bid to the NCAA tournament, their first NCAA bid since 1962, where they defeated Baylor in the first round to advance to the second round where they lost to Duke.

== Offseason ==
=== Departures ===
Name	Number	Pos.	Height	Weight	Year	Hometown	Notes
Khaliq Ghani	00	G	6'5"	205	Senior	Inglewood, CA	Graduated
Jack Montague	4	G	6'0"	185	Senior	Brentwood, TN	Expelled
Nick Victor	21	G	6'5"	220	Senior	Dallas, TX	Graduated
Justin Sears	22	F	6'8"	205	Senior	Plainfield, NJ	Graduated
Brandon Sherrod	35	F	6'6"	240	Senior	Bridgeport, CT	Graduated
Sem Kroon	50	F	6'10"	240	Sophomore	Riverside, CT	Left the team for personal reasons

=== 2016 recruiting class ===
College recruiting information
Name	Hometown	School	Height	Weight	Commit date
Jordan Bruner; PF	Columbia, SC	Spring Valley High School	6 ft 7 in (2.01 m)	190 lb (86 kg)	Nov 13, 2015
Jordan Bruner; PF	Recruit ratings: Scout: Rivals: (79)				
Eric Monroe; PG	San Diego, CA	Saint Augustine High School	6 ft 2 in (1.88 m)	170 lb (77 kg)	Aug 4, 2026
Eric Monroe; PG	Recruit ratings: Scout: Rivals: (69)				
Miye Oni; SF	Porter Ranch, CA	Viewpoint School, Suffield Academy	6 ft 6 in (1.98 m)	190 lb (86 kg)	Jul 1, 2026
Miye Oni; SF	Recruit ratings: Scout: Rivals: (NR)				
Overall recruit ranking:
Note: In many cases, Scout, Rivals, 247Sports, On3, and ESPN may conflict in their listings of height and weight.; In these cases, the average was taken. ESPN grades are on a 100-point scale.; Sources: "2016 Team Ranking". Rivals.

=== 2017 recruiting class ===
College recruiting information (2017)
Name	Hometown	School	Height	Weight	Commit date
Azar Swain; SG	Boston, MA	The Rivers School	6 ft 1 in (1.85 m)	160 lb (73 kg)	
Azar Swain; SG	Recruit ratings: Scout: Rivals: (59)				
Jalen Gabbidon; SG	Harrisburg, PA	Glenelg Country School	6 ft 5 in (1.96 m)	185 lb (84 kg)	Aug 7, 2026
Jalen Gabbidon; SG	Recruit ratings: Scout: Rivals: (NR)				
Paul Atkinson; PF	Palm Beach Gardens, FL	Westminster Academy	6 ft 8 in (2.03 m)	220 lb (100 kg)	Sep 4, 2026
Paul Atkinson; PF	Recruit ratings: Scout: Rivals: (NR)				
Overall recruit ranking:
Note: In many cases, Scout, Rivals, 247Sports, On3, and ESPN may conflict in their listings of height and weight.; In these cases, the average was taken. ESPN grades are on a 100-point scale.; Sources: "2017 Team Ranking". Rivals.

== Roster ==
2016–17 Yale Bulldogs men's basketball team
Players
Coaches

Pos.	#	Name	Height	Weight	Year	Previous school	Hometown
G	1	Anthony Dallier (C)	6 ft 6 in (1.98 m)	190 lb (86 kg)	Sr	Northfield Mount Hermon	Wexford, PA
G	2	Eric Monroe	6 ft 2 in (1.88 m)	175 lb (79 kg)	Fr	St. Augustine	San Diego, CA
G	3	Alex Copeland	6 ft 3 in (1.91 m)	170 lb (77 kg)	So	Harvard-Westlake	Los Angeles, CA
F	10	Eric Anderson	6 ft 7 in (2.01 m)	215 lb (98 kg)	Jr	Haverford School	West Chester, PA
G	11	Makai Mason	6 ft 1 in (1.85 m)	185 lb (84 kg)	Jr	Hotchkiss School	Greenfield, MA
G	13	Trey Phills	6 ft 2 in (1.88 m)	185 lb (84 kg)	So	Charlotte Christian	Charlotte, NC
F	20	Matt Greene	6 ft 7 in (2.01 m)	205 lb (93 kg)	So	Hotchkiss School	Brooklyn, NY
F	22	Austin Williams	6 ft 8 in (2.03 m)	225 lb (102 kg)	Fr	Bolles School	Jacksonville, FL
F	23	Jordan Bruner	6 ft 9 in (2.06 m)	194 lb (88 kg)	Fr	Spring Valley	Columbia, SC
G	24	Miye Oni	6 ft 6 in (1.98 m)	200 lb (91 kg)	Fr	Viewpoint; Suffield Academy	Porter Ranch, CA
G	25	A. J. Edwards	6 ft 5 in (1.96 m)	190 lb (86 kg)	Sr	South Kent School	Seattle, WA
G	30	Landon Russell	6 ft 2 in (1.88 m)	180 lb (82 kg)	Jr	Nolan Catholic	Fort Worth, TX
F	32	Blake Reynolds	6 ft 7 in (2.01 m)	220 lb (100 kg)	So	Jackson	Jackson, MO
G	34	Thomas Ryan	6 ft 4 in (1.93 m)	190 lb (86 kg)	Fr	Hotchkiss School	New York City, NY
F	44	Sam Downey	6 ft 9 in (2.06 m)	230 lb (104 kg)	Sr	Lake Forest	Lake Forest, IL

Head coach

- James Jones (Albany)

Assistant coach(es)

- Matt Kingsley (Wesleyan)
- Justin Simon (Yale)
- Anthony Goins (St. John's)

Legend

- (C) Team captain
- (S) Suspended
- (I) Ineligible
- (W) Walk-on
- Injured
- Current redshirt

Roster
Last update: August 25, 2024

== Schedule and results ==
Date time, TV	Rank^{#}	Opponent^{#}	Result	Record	Site (attendance) city, state
Non-conference regular season
November 13, 2016*; 5:00 p.m., P12N		at Washington	W 98–90	1–0	Alaska Airlines Arena (7,456); Seattle, WA
November 17, 2016*; 7:00 p.m.		Lehigh	W 89–81 ^{OT}	2–0	John J. Lee Amphitheater (1,062); New Haven, CT
November 20, 2016*; 1:00 p.m., ACCN Extra		at No. 8 Virginia	W 62–38	2–1	John Paul Jones Arena (14,242); Charlottesville, VA
November 22, 2016*; 7:00 p.m., ACCN Extra		at Pittsburgh	L 70–75	2–2	Petersen Events Center (6,719); Pittsburgh, PA
November 26, 2016*; 1:00 p.m.		at Vermont	L 65–67	2–3	Patrick Gym (2,173); Burlington, VT
November 30, 2016*; 7:00 p.m.		at Bryant	L 70–79	2–4	Chace Athletic Center; Smithfield, RI
December 3, 2016*; 2:00 p.m.		Albany	W 59–55	3–4	John J. Lee Amphitheater (1,204); New Haven, CT
December 8, 2016*; 8:00 p.m.		at Sacred Heart	W 66–52	4–4	William H. Pitt Center; Fairfield, CT
December 11, 2016*; 2:00 p.m.		Delaware	W 81–63	5–4	John J. Lee Amphitheater (1,014); New Haven, CT
December 13, 2016*; 7:00 p.m.		Central Connecticut	W 90–59	6–4	John J. Lee Amphitheater (756); New Haven, CT
December 22, 2016*; 7:00 p.m., ESPNU		at Temple	L 77–83	6–5	Liacouras Center (4,775); Philadelphia, PA
January 2, 2017*; 7:00 p.m.		Hartford	W 88–72	7–5	John J. Lee Amphitheater (747); New Haven, CT
January 7, 2017*; 2:00 p.m.		Mitchell	W 102–46	8–5	John J. Lee Amphitheater (739); New Haven, CT
Ivy League regular season
January 13, 2017; 8:00 p.m.		at Penn	W 68–60	9–5 (1–0)	The Palestra (2,903); Philadelphia, PA
January 14, 2017; 8:00 p.m., ONE		at Princeton	L 58–66	9–6 (1–1)	Jadwin Gymnasium (2,262); Princeton, NJ
January 20, 2017; 8:00 p.m., ESPN3		at Brown	W 75–74	10–6 (2–1)	Pizzitola Sports Center (1,217); Providence, RI
January 27, 2017; 8:00 p.m.		Brown	W 85–75	11–6 (3–1)	John J. Lee Amphitheater (1,673); New Haven, CT
February 3, 2017; 7:00 p.m.		at Columbia	W 87–78	12–6 (4–1)	Levien Gymnasium (2,187); New York City, NY
February 4, 2017; 6:00 p.m.		at Cornell	W 78–71	13–6 (5–1)	Newman Arena (875); Ithaca, NY
February 10, 2017; 7:00 p.m.		Dartmouth	W 73–64	14–6 (6–1)	John J. Lee Amphitheater (1,284); New Haven, CT
February 11, 2017; 7:00 p.m., ONE		Harvard	L 67–75	14–7 (6–2)	John J. Lee Amphitheater (2,532); New Haven, CT
February 17, 2017; 8:00 p.m., ESPN3		Princeton	L 52–71	14–8 (6–3)	John J. Lee Amphitheater (1,846); New Haven, CT
February 18, 2017; 1:00 p.m., ASN		Penn	L 55–71	14–9 (6–4)	John J. Lee Amphitheater (1,567); New Haven, CT
February 24, 2017; 7:00 p.m., ESPN3		at Harvard	L 64–77	14–10 (6–5)	Lavietes Pavilion (2,195); Cambridge, MA
February 25, 2017; 7:00 p.m., ESPN3		at Dartmouth	W 99–86	15–10 (7–5)	Leede Arena (937); Hanover, NH
March 3, 2017; 7:00 p.m., ESPN3		Cornell	W 90–63	16–10 (8–5)	John J. Lee Amphitheater (1,411); New Haven, CT
March 4, 2017; 7:00 p.m.		Columbia	W 75–71	17–10 (9–5)	John J. Lee Amphitheater (1,787); New Haven, CT
Ivy League men's tournament
March 11, 2017; 4:00 p.m., ESPNU	(3)	vs. (2) Harvard; Semifinals	W 73–71	18–10	The Palestra (8,722); Philadelphia, PA
March 12, 2017; 12:00 p.m., ESPN2	(3)	vs. (1) Princeton; Championship	L 59–71	18–11	The Palestra; Philadelphia, PA
*Non-conference game. ^{#}Rankings from AP poll. (#) Tournament seedings in parentheses. All times are in Eastern.

== Rankings ==
Ranking movements Legend: RV = Received votes
	Week																			
Poll	Pre	1	2	3	4	5	6	7	8	9	10	11	12	13	14	15	16	17	18	Final
AP		RV																		Not released
Coaches'	RV		RV																	
