= 2016–17 Princeton Tigers men's basketball team =

American college basketball season

2016–17 Princeton Tigers men's basketball

Ivy League regular season and tournament champions

NCAA tournament, First Round
- Conference: Ivy League
- Record: 23–7 (14–0 Ivy)
- Head coach: Mitch Henderson (6th season)
- Assistant coaches: Kerry Kittles; Brett MacConnell; Skye Ettin
- Home arena: Jadwin Gymnasium

2016–17 Ivy League men's basketball standings
	Conf.				Overall
Team	W		L	PCT	W		L	PCT
x-Princeton †	14	–	0	1.000	23	–	7	.767
Harvard	10	–	4	.714	18	–	10	.643
Yale	9	–	5	.643	18	–	11	.621
Penn	6	–	8	.429	13	–	15	.464
Columbia	5	–	9	.357	11	–	16	.407
Brown	4	–	10	.286	13	–	17	.433
Cornell	4	–	10	.286	8	–	21	.276
Dartmouth	4	–	10	.286	7	–	20	.259
† 2017 Ivy League Tournament winner x – Ivy League champions

The 2016–17 Princeton Tigers men's basketball team represented Princeton University during the 2016–17 NCAA Division I men's basketball season. The Tigers, led by sixth-year head coach Mitch Henderson, played their home games at Jadwin Gymnasium as members of the Ivy League. They finished the season 23–7, 14–0 in Ivy League play to win the Ivy League regular season championship. They defeated Penn and Yale to win the inaugural Ivy League tournament championship. As a result, they earned the conference's automatic bid to the NCAA tournament as the No. 12 seed in the West Region. There they lost in the First Round to Notre Dame.

== Previous season ==
The Tigers finished the 2015–16 season 22–7, 12–2 in Ivy League play to finish in second place. They were invited to the National Invitation Tournament where they lost in the first round to Virginia Tech.

== Offseason ==
=== Departures ===
Name	Number	Pos.	Height	Weight	Year	Hometown	Notes
Mike Washington, Jr.	13	G	6'3"	190	Senior	Oak Harbor, WA	Graduated

=== 2016 recruiting class ===
College recruiting information
Name	Hometown	School	Height	Weight	Commit date
Will Gladson #42 C	St. Louis, MO	Chaminade College Prep	6 ft 10 in (2.08 m)	N/A	Dec 31, 2015
Will Gladson #42 C	Recruit ratings: Scout: Rivals: (74)				
Vittorio Reynoso-Avila #61 SF	La Mirada, CA	La Mirada High School	6 ft 5 in (1.96 m)	185 lb (84 kg)	Dec 13, 2015
Vittorio Reynoso-Avila #61 SF	Recruit ratings: Scout: Rivals: (71)				
Richmond Aririguzoh #110 PF	Trenton, NJ	Trenton Catholic Academy	6 ft 8 in (2.03 m)	205 lb (93 kg)	Mar 20, 2016
Richmond Aririguzoh #110 PF	Recruit ratings: Scout: Rivals: (59)				
Jose Morales; PG	Fort Lauderdale, FL	Cardinal Gibbons High School	5 ft 9 in (1.75 m)	160 lb (73 kg)	Sep 22, 2014
Jose Morales; PG	Recruit ratings: Scout: Rivals: (NR)				
Overall recruit ranking:
Note: In many cases, Scout, Rivals, 247Sports, On3, and ESPN may conflict in their listings of height and weight.; In these cases, the average was taken. ESPN grades are on a 100-point scale.; Sources: "2016 Team Ranking". Rivals.

=== 2017 recruiting class ===
College recruiting information (2017)
Name	Hometown	School	Height	Weight	Commit date
Jerome Desrosiers #68 PF	Montreal, QE	Northfield-Mt. Hermon School	6 ft 6 in (1.98 m)	215 lb (98 kg)	Jun 7, 2016
Jerome Desrosiers #68 PF	Recruit ratings: Scout: Rivals: (73)				
Elijah Barnes; PF	Middletown, NJ	Mater Dei High School	6 ft 6 in (1.98 m)	180 lb (82 kg)	Jun 28, 2016
Elijah Barnes; PF	Recruit ratings: Scout: Rivals: (NR)				
Ryan Schwieger; SG	Matthews, SC	Weddington High School	6 ft 6 in (1.98 m)	N/A	Aug 22, 2016
Ryan Schwieger; SG	Recruit ratings: Scout: Rivals: (NR)				
Overall recruit ranking:
Note: In many cases, Scout, Rivals, 247Sports, On3, and ESPN may conflict in their listings of height and weight.; In these cases, the average was taken. ESPN grades are on a 100-point scale.; Sources: "2017 Team Ranking". Rivals.

== Roster ==
2016–17 Princeton Tigers men's basketball team
Players
Coaches

Pos.	#	Name	Height	Weight	Year	Previous school	Hometown
G	0	Aaron Young	6 ft 0 in (1.83 m)	176 lb (80 kg)	Jr	Virginia Episcopal School	Falls Church, VA
F	1	Vittorio Reynoso-Avila	6 ft 5 in (1.96 m)	165 lb (75 kg)	Fr	La Mirada	La Mirada, CA
G	2	Jose Morales	5 ft 9 in (1.75 m)	165 lb (75 kg)	Fr	Hun School	Miramar, FL
G	3	Devin Cannady	6 ft 1 in (1.85 m)	179 lb (81 kg)	So	Marian	Mishawaka, IN
G	5	Amir Bell	6 ft 3 in (1.91 m)	184 lb (83 kg)	Jr	East Brunswick	East Brunswick, NJ
F	10	Spencer Weisz (C)	6 ft 4 in (1.93 m)	209 lb (95 kg)	Sr	Seton Hall Prep	Florham Park, NJ
G	11	Elias Berbari	6 ft 2 in (1.88 m)	179 lb (81 kg)	So	Harborfields	Greenlawn, NY
G	12	Myles Stephens	6 ft 4 in (1.93 m)	198 lb (90 kg)	So	St. Andrew's	Lawrenceville, NJ
F	13	Will Gladson	6 ft 10 in (2.08 m)	255 lb (116 kg)	Fr	Chaminade College Prep	Chesterfield, MO
G	14	Khyan Rayner	5 ft 11 in (1.8 m)	163 lb (74 kg)	Sr	Jesuit	Portland, OR
F	20	Jackson Forbes	6 ft 6 in (1.98 m)	217 lb (98 kg)	Jr	John Paul II	Plano, TX
F	21	Henry Caruso	6 ft 4 in (1.93 m)	200 lb (91 kg)	Jr	Junípero Serra	San Mateo, CA
F	23	Mike LeBlanc	6 ft 6 in (1.98 m)	197 lb (89 kg)	Jr	New Hampton	Dover, DE
F	25	Steven Cook (C)	6 ft 5 in (1.96 m)	197 lb (89 kg)	Sr	Wauwatosa West	Winnetka, IL
F	30	Hans Brase	6 ft 8 in (2.03 m)	225 lb (102 kg)	Sr	Hill School	Clover, SC
F	31	Pete Miller	6 ft 10 in (2.08 m)	235 lb (107 kg)	Sr	Northfield Mount Hermon	Winchester, MA
C	34	Richmond Aririguzoh	6 ft 9 in (2.06 m)	215 lb (98 kg)	Fr	Trenton Catholic	Ewing, NJ
F	35	Alec Brennan	6 ft 11 in (2.11 m)	224 lb (102 kg)	Jr	Milton Academy	Weston, MA
F	44	Noah Bramlage	6 ft 9 in (2.06 m)	237 lb (108 kg)	So	Ottawa-Glandorf	Glandorf, OH

Head coach

- Mitch Henderson (Princeton)

Assistant coach(es)

- Kerry Kittles (Villanova)
- Brett MacConnell (Rutgers)
- Skye Ettin (TCNJ)

Legend

- (C) Team captain
- (S) Suspended
- (I) Ineligible
- (W) Walk-on
- Injured
- Current redshirt

Roster

== Schedule and results ==
Date time, TV	Rank^{#}	Opponent^{#}	Result	Record	Site (attendance) city, state
Non-conference regular season
11/14/2016*; 10:00 pm, ESPN2		at BYU; College Hoops Tip-Off Marathon	L 73–82	0–1	Marriott Center (15,926); Provo, UT
11/20/2016*; 2:00 pm		at Lehigh	L 67–76	0–2	Stabler Arena (1,388); Bethlehem, PA
11/23/2016*; 7:00 pm		at Lafayette	W 71–55	1–2	Kirby Sports Center (1,077); Easton, PA
11/25/2016*; 7:00 pm		Rowan	W 108–46	2–2	Jadwin Gymnasium (1,559); Princeton, NJ
11/29/2016*; 7:00 pm, MASN		at VCU	L 70–81	2–3	Siegel Center (7,637); Richmond, VA
12/06/2016*; 7:00 pm, FS1		vs. California; Pearl Harbor Basketball Invitational	L 51–62	2–4	Bloch Arena (4,024); Honolulu, HI
12/07/2016*; 9:30 pm, FS1		vs. Hawaii; Pearl Harbor Basketball Invitational	W 75–62	3–4	Bloch Arena (4,024); Honolulu, HI
12/10/2016*; 2:00 pm, ESPN3		at Liberty	W 67–64	4–4	Vines Center (2,510); Lynchburg, VA
12/14/2016*; 5:00 pm, ESPNU		Saint Joseph's	L 68–76	4–5	Jadwin Gymnasium (2,360); Princeton, NJ
12/20/2016*; 7:00 pm, ESPN3		at Monmouth	L 90–96	4–6	OceanFirst Bank Center (3,530); West Long Branch, NJ
12/22/2016*; 7:00 pm		at Bucknell	W 72–70	5–6	Sojka Pavilion (3,216); Lewisburg, PA
12/28/2016*; 5:00 pm		Hampton	W 77–49	6–6	Jadwin Gymnasium (1,838); Princeton, NJ
12/31/2016*; 1:00 pm		Cal Poly	W 81–52	7–6	Jadwin Gymnasium (2,022); Princeton, NJ
Ivy League regular Season
01/07/2017; 8:00 pm		Penn; Rivalry	W 61–52	8–6 (1–0)	Jadwin Gymnasium (2,814); Princeton, NJ
01/13/2017; 8:00 pm		Brown	W 97–66	9–6 (2–0)	Jadwin Gymnasium (1,735); Princeton, NJ
01/14/2017; 7:00 pm		Yale	W 66–58	10–6 (3–0)	Jadwin Gymnasium (2,262); Princeton, NJ
02/03/2017; 7:00 pm		at Dartmouth	W 69–64	11–6 (4–0)	Leede Arena (862); Hanover, NH
02/04/2017; 7:00 pm, ESPN3		at Harvard	W 57–56	12–6 (5–0)	Lavietes Pavilion (2,195); Cambridge, MA
02/07/2017; 7:00 pm		at Penn; Rivalry	W 64–49	13–6 (6–0)	Palestra (6,215); Philadelphia, PA
02/10/2017; 7:00 pm, ESPN3		Cornell	W 69–60	14–6 (7–0)	Jadwin Gymnasium (2,012); Princeton, NJ
02/11/2017; 6:00 pm		Columbia	W 61–59	15–6 (8–0)	Jadwin Gymnasium (2,803); Princeton, NJ
02/17/2017; 8:00 pm, ESPN3		at Yale	W 71–52	16–6 (9–0)	John J. Lee Amphitheater (1,846); New Haven, CT
02/18/2017; 6:30 pm		at Brown	W 66–51	17–6 (10–0)	Pizzitola Sports Center (1,498); Providence, RI
02/24/2017; 7:00 pm		at Columbia	W 64–45	18–6 (11–0)	Levien Gymnasium; New York City, NY
02/25/2017; 6:00 pm, ESPN3		at Cornell	W 75–60	19–6 (12–0)	Newman Arena (1,381); Ithaca, NY
03/03/2017; 5:30 pm, ESPNU		Harvard	W 73–69	20–6 (13–0)	Jadwin Gymnasium; Princeton, NJ
03/04/2017; 6:00 pm, ESPN3		Dartmouth	W 85–48	21–6 (14–0)	Jadwin Gymnasium (3,087); Princeton, NJ
Ivy League Tournament
03/11/2017; 1:30 pm, ESPNU	(1)	vs. (4) Penn; Semifinals	W 72–64 ^{OT}	22–6	Palestra; Philadelphia, PA
03/12/2017; 12:00 pm, ESPN2	(1)	vs. (3) Yale; Championship	W 71–59	23–6	Palestra; Philadelphia, PA
NCAA tournament
03/16/2017*; 12:15 pm, CBS	(12 W)	vs. (5 W) No. 14 Notre Dame; First Round	L 58–60	23–7	KeyBank Center (17,806); Buffalo, NY
*Non-conference game. ^{#}Rankings from AP Poll. (#) Tournament seedings in parentheses. W=West Region. All times are in Eastern Time.

== Honors and accomplishments ==
Mitch Henderson was a unanimous Ivy League Coach of the Year selection.

Senior forward Spencer Weisz was selected as Ivy League Men's Basketball Player of the Year and a unanimous All-Ivy League first team honoree, despite only ranking fourth on Princeton in scoring average. He became the 8th player in Ivy League history to win both the league's Rookie of the Year Award and Player of the Year Award. Weisz also earned honorable mention on the Associated Press All-America team, and was named to the Jewish Sports Review 2016-17 Men's College Basketball All-American First Team. Weisz led Princeton in rebounds, assists (4.2 per game; 125; 2nd in the league), and steals (1.5 per game; 46; 2nd in the Ivy League), while coming in 2nd in the league in assist-to-turnover ratio (2.6), 5th in 3-point field goals (61) and defensive rebounds (137), and 10th in total rebounds (161). In December 2016, he tied the Princeton single-game record for assists in a game, with 13 against Liberty. He posted his career high of 26 points in a February 3, 2017, 69–64 victory over Dartmouth. He served again as a co-captain.

Senior Steven Cook was also a unanimous All-Ivy League first team honoree, and was named a third team Academic All-America selection. Cook was included on the National Association of Basketball Coaches Division I All-District 13 first-team. Weisz and Devin Cannady were second team selections.

Myles Stephens was named Ivy League Defensive Player of the Year and an All-Ivy League first team honoree. Stephens was the most outstanding player of the 2017 Ivy League men's basketball tournament, and Cook was also on the All-Tournament team. The tournament was the inaugural Ivy League men's basketball tournament. By virtue of winning the tournament, the team earned Princeton its first NCAA Division I men's basketball tournament invitation since the 2010–11 team did so.

== See also ==
- 2016–17 Princeton Tigers women's basketball team
