= 2016–17 Columbia Lions men's basketball team =

American college basketball season

2016–17 Columbia Lions men's basketball
- Conference: Ivy League
- Record: 11–16 (5–9 Ivy)
- Head coach: Jim Engles (1st season)
- Assistant coaches: Jesse Agel; Jean Bain; Jared Czech
- Home arena: Levien Gymnasium

2016–17 Ivy League men's basketball standings
	Conf.				Overall
Team	W		L	PCT	W		L	PCT
x-Princeton †	14	–	0	1.000	23	–	7	.767
Harvard	10	–	4	.714	18	–	10	.643
Yale	9	–	5	.643	18	–	11	.621
Penn	6	–	8	.429	13	–	15	.464
Columbia	5	–	9	.357	11	–	16	.407
Brown	4	–	10	.286	13	–	17	.433
Cornell	4	–	10	.286	8	–	21	.276
Dartmouth	4	–	10	.286	7	–	20	.259
† 2017 Ivy League Tournament winner x – Ivy League champions

The 2016–17 Columbia Lions men's basketball team represented Columbia University during the 2016–17 NCAA Division I men's basketball season. The Lions, led by first-year head coach Jim Engles, played their home games at Levien Gymnasium in New York City and were members of the Ivy League. They finished the season 11–16, 5–9 in Ivy League play to finish in fifth place. They failed to qualify for the inaugural Ivy League tournament.

== Previous season ==
The Lions finished the 2015–16 season 25–10, 10–4 in Ivy League play to finish in third place. They were invited to the CollegeInsider.com Tournament where they defeated Norfolk State, Ball State, NJIT and UC Irvine to become CIT champions.

== Offseason ==
=== Departures ===
Name	Number	Pos.	Height	Weight	Year	Hometown	Notes
Isaac Cohen	2	G	6'4"	220	Senior	Orlando, FL	Graduated
Grant Mullins	3	G	6'3"	175	Senior	Burlington, ON	Graduate transferred to California
Maodo Lo	12	G	6'3"	190	Senior	Berlin, Germany	Graduated
Alex Rosenburg	13	F	6'7"	220	RS Senior	Short Hills, NJ	Graduated
Paddy Quinn	20	G	6'1"	190	Senior	Ramsey, NJ	Graduated

=== 2016 recruiting class ===
College recruiting
Name	Hometown	School	Height	Weight	Commit date
Mike Smith; PG	Chicago, IL	Fenwick High School	5 ft 10 in (1.78 m)	165 lb (75 kg)	Mar 21, 2016
Mike Smith; PG	Recruit ratings: Scout: Rivals: (NR)				
Patrick Tape; PF	Matthews, NC	Queen's Grant High School	6 ft 9 in (2.06 m)	N/A	Jun 28, 2015
Patrick Tape; PF	Recruit ratings: Scout: Rivals: (NR)				
Overall recruit ranking:
Note: In many cases, Scout, Rivals, 247Sports, On3, and ESPN may conflict in their listings of height and weight.; In these cases, the average was taken. ESPN grades are on a 100-point scale.; Sources: "2016 Team Ranking". Rivals.

=== 2017 recruiting class ===
College recruiting (2017)
Name	Hometown	School	Height	Weight	Commit date
Jaron Faulds #33 C	Holt, MI	Holt High School	6 ft 10 in (2.08 m)	225 lb (102 kg)	Jul 1, 2016
Jaron Faulds #33 C	Recruit ratings: Scout: Rivals: (80)				
Myles Hanson; SG	Chaska, MN	Chaska High School	6 ft 5 in (1.96 m)	N/A	
Myles Hanson; SG	Recruit ratings: Scout: Rivals: (NR)				
Gabriele Stefanini; SG	Bologna, Italy	Bergen Catholic High School	6 ft 3 in (1.91 m)	N/A	
Gabriele Stefanini; SG	Recruit ratings: Scout: Rivals: (NR)				
Overall recruit ranking:
Note: In many cases, Scout, Rivals, 247Sports, On3, and ESPN may conflict in their listings of height and weight.; In these cases, the average was taken. ESPN grades are on a 100-point scale.; Sources: "2017 Team Ranking". Rivals.

== Roster ==
2016–17 Columbia Lions men's basketball team
Players
Coaches

Pos.	#	Name	Height	Weight	Year	Previous school	Hometown
G	0	Kyle Castlin	6 ft 4 in (1.93 m)	185 lb (84 kg)	Jr	Hillsgrove	Marietta, GA
F	1	Jeff Coby	6 ft 8 in (2.03 m)	223 lb (101 kg)	Sr	Choate Rosemary Hall/Sagemont	Pembroke Pines, FL
F	2	Andrew Panayiotou	6 ft 7 in (2.01 m)	194 lb (88 kg)	Fr	Melbourne Grammar School	Victoria, Australia
F	3	Patrick Tape	6 ft 10 in (2.08 m)	220 lb (100 kg)	Fr	Queen's Grant	Matthews, NC
G/F	4	Rodney Hunter	6 ft 5 in (1.96 m)	185 lb (84 kg)	So	Mariner	Cape Coral, FL
G	5	C. J. Davis	6 ft 2 in (1.88 m)	207 lb (94 kg)	So	Peddie School/Archbishop Molloy	Far Rockaway, NY
G	10	Quinton Adlesh	6 ft 0 in (1.83 m)	190 lb (86 kg)	So	Mission College Prep	Arroyo Grande, CA
F	11	Lukas Meisner	6 ft 8 in (2.03 m)	210 lb (95 kg)	So	IGS Franzsches Feld	Braunschweig, Germany
G	12	Mike Smith	5 ft 10 in (1.78 m)	179 lb (81 kg)	Fr	Fenwick	Burr Ridge, IL
G	14	Kendall Jackson	5 ft 8 in (1.73 m)	160 lb (73 kg)	Sr	Suffield Academy/Bishop O'Dowd	Union City, CA
G	20	Jake Killingsworth	6 ft 5 in (1.96 m)	205 lb (93 kg)	Fr	Junípero Serra	San Carlos, CA
G	21	Peter Barba	6 ft 5 in (1.96 m)	190 lb (86 kg)	So	Western Reserve Academy	Chagrin Falls, OH
G	22	Nate Hickman	6 ft 4 in (1.93 m)	175 lb (79 kg)	Jr	Peddie School	Wilmington, DE
F	24	John Sica	6 ft 7 in (2.01 m)	195 lb (88 kg)	So	Bethlehem Central	Delmar, NY
F	32	Chris McComber	6 ft 8 in (2.03 m)	244 lb (111 kg)	Sr	John McCrae Secondary School/REDA	Nepean, ON
F	33	Luke Petrasek	6 ft 10 in (2.08 m)	215 lb (98 kg)	Sr	Northport	East Northport, NY
C	41	Shane Eberle	6 ft 10 in (2.08 m)	253 lb (115 kg)	So	Ourt Lake of Good Counsel	Woodbine, MD
C	52	Connor Voss	7 ft 1 in (2.16 m)	260 lb (118 kg)	Sr	Cathedral	St. Cloud, MN

Head coach

- Jim Engles (Dickinson)

Assistant coach(es)

- Jesse Agel (Vermont)
- Jean Bain (Northeastern)
- Jared Czech (Manhattanville)

Legend

- (C) Team captain
- (S) Suspended
- (I) Ineligible
- (W) Walk-on
- Injured
- Current redshirt

Roster

== Schedule and results ==
Date time, TV	Rank^{#}	Opponent^{#}	Result	Record	Site (attendance) city, state
Non-conference regular season
11/11/2016*; 7:00 pm		at Stony Brook	W 73–66	1–0	Island Federal Credit Union Arena (3,385); Stony Brook, NY
11/14/2016*; 7:00 pm		at Saint Joseph's	L 65–85	1–1	Hagan Arena (3,543); Philadelphia, PA
11/21/2016*; 7:00 pm		at Quinnipiac	W 86–78	2–1	TD Bank Sports Center (802); Hamden, CT
11/23/2016*; 7:00 pm		Army	L 83–88	2–2	Levien Gymnasium (1,011); New York City, NY
11/26/2016*; 2:00 pm		Colgate	W 81–78	3–2	Levien Gymnasium (1,148); New York City, NY
11/29/2016*; 7:00 pm		Hofstra	L 86–88	3–3	Levien Gymnasium (763); New York City, NY
12/01/2016*; 7:00 pm, FS1		at Seton Hall	L 71–95	3–4	Prudential Center (6,463); Newark, NJ
12/09/2016*; 7:00 pm		at Navy	L 54–69	3–5	Alumni Hall (876); Annapolis, MD
12/11/2016*; 12:00 pm		Manhattanville	W 84–42	4–5	Levien Gymnasium (807); New York City, NY
12/28/2016*; 7:00 pm, ACCN Extra		at Miami (FL)	L 67–78	4–6	BankUnited Center (7,045); Coral Gables, FL
12/30/2016*; 7:00 pm		Albany	L 67–70	4–7	Levien Gymnasium (1,327); New York City, NY
01/02/2017*; 2:00 pm		at Maine	W 98–73	5–7	Cross Insurance Center (942); Bangor, ME
01/07/2017*; 7:00 pm		Howard	W 66–48	6–7	Levien Gymnasium (1,193); New York City, NY
Ivy League regular season
01/14/2017; 4:00 pm		at Cornell	W 79–75	7–7 (1–0)	Newman Arena (2,437); Ithaca, NY
01/21/2017; 7:00 pm		Cornell	L 62–67	7–8 (1–1)	Levien Gymnasium (2,220); New York City, NY
01/27/2017; 7:00 pm		Dartmouth	W 66–54	8–8 (2–1)	Levien Gymnasium (1,274); New York City, NY
01/28/2017; 7:00 pm		Harvard	W 65–62	9–8 (3–1)	Levien Gymnasium (2,488); New York City, NY
02/03/2017; 7:00 pm		Yale	L 78–87	9–9 (3–2)	Levien Gymnasium (2,187); New York City, NY
02/04/2017; 7:00 pm		Brown	W 83–78	10–9 (4–2)	Levien Gymnasium (1,843); New York City, NY
02/10/2017; 7:00 pm, ESPN3		at Penn	L 62–70	10–10 (4–3)	Palestra (3,890); Philadelphia, PA
02/11/2017; 6:00 pm		at Princeton	L 59–61	10–11 (4–4)	Jadwin Gymnasium (2,803); Princeton, NJ
02/17/2017; 7:00 pm, ESPN3		at Harvard	L 72–78	10–12 (4–5)	Lavietes Pavilion (1,935); Cambridge, MA
02/18/2017; 7:00 pm, ESPN3		at Dartmouth	L 79–80 ^{OT}	10–13 (4–6)	Leede Arena (829); Hanover, NH
02/24/2017; 7:00 pm		Princeton	L 45–64	10–14 (4–7)	Levien Gymnasium; New York City, NY
02/25/2017; 7:00 pm, ESPN3		Penn	W 70–67	11–14 (5–7)	Levien Gymnasium (2,544); New York City, NY
03/03/2017; 7:00 pm, ESPN3		at Brown	L 68–88	11–15 (5–8)	Pizzitola Sports Center (702); Providence, RI
03/04/2017; 7:00 pm		at Yale	L 71–75	11–16 (5–9)	John J. Lee Amphitheater (1,787); New Haven, CT
*Non-conference game. ^{#}Rankings from AP Poll. (#) Tournament seedings in parentheses. All times are in Eastern Time.

== See also ==
- 2016–17 Columbia Lions women's basketball team
