= The Patrick School =

Private high school in Union County, New Jersey, US

Location
- 400 Jefferson Street; Hackettstown, New Jersey, Warren County, New Jersey 07840; United States; 40.8492192°N 74.8326176°W

Information
- Type: Private
- Established: September 2012
- Principal: Mary Jo McKinley
- Faculty: 16.8
- Grades: 9–12
- Gender: Coeducational
- Student to teacher ratio: 12.5:1
- Campus: Urban
- Colors: Green and White
- Athletics conference: Union County Interscholastic Athletic Conference
- Sports: Basketball, Baseball, Girls Basketball, Track, Cross Country, Volleyball, Soccer
- Nickname: Fighting Celtics
- Team name: Celtics
- Rival: St. Anthony, St. Benedict's
- Accreditation: Middle States Association of Colleges and Schools
- Newspaper: The Celtic Pride
- Yearbook: The Celtic Cross
- Tuition: $7,700 (2019-20)
- Website: thepatrickschool.org

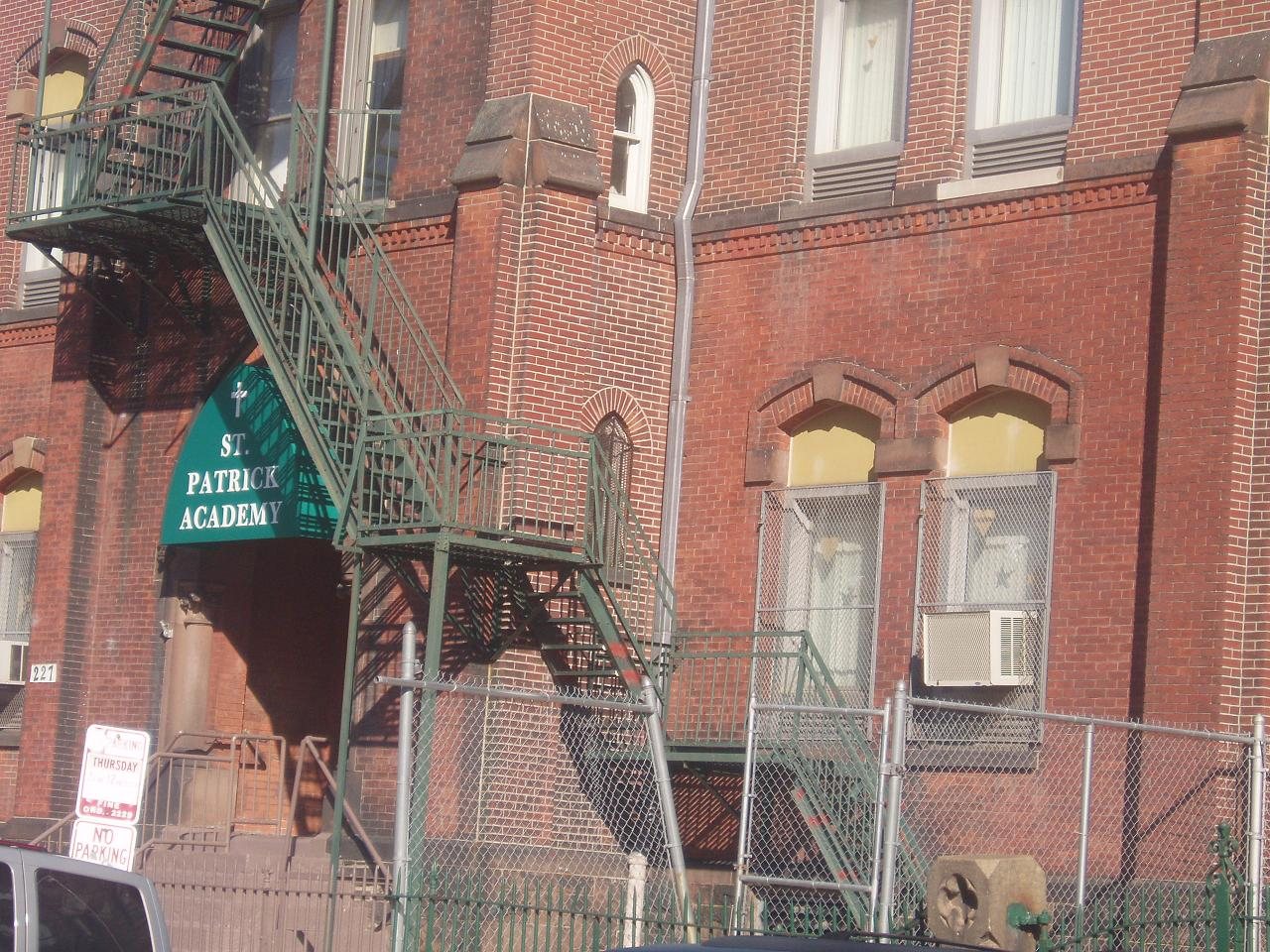
St. Patrick High School Academy in Elizabethport which was shuttered

The Patrick School (TPS) is an independent co-educational four-year high school in Hackettstown, New Jersey, United States. The school was established in 2012 following the closure of St. Patrick High School, which was a co-educational four-year Catholic high school in Elizabeth, New Jersey, that operated under the auspices of the Roman Catholic Archdiocese of Newark and had been founded as a vocational school in 1863 as part of Saint Patrick's Parish in Elizabeth, making it the oldest parochial high school in New Jersey. The Patrick School originally operated on the site in Elizabeth that had been St. Patrick High School and the school has continued to carry on the legacy of its predecessor even after its move to Hillside.

The Patrick School is accredited by the Middle States Association of Colleges and Schools through July 2029.

The Patrick School reached an agreement with Centenary University in December 2024 that relocated TPS to the university's campus in Hackettstown, with students also having the option to live on campus.

== History ==
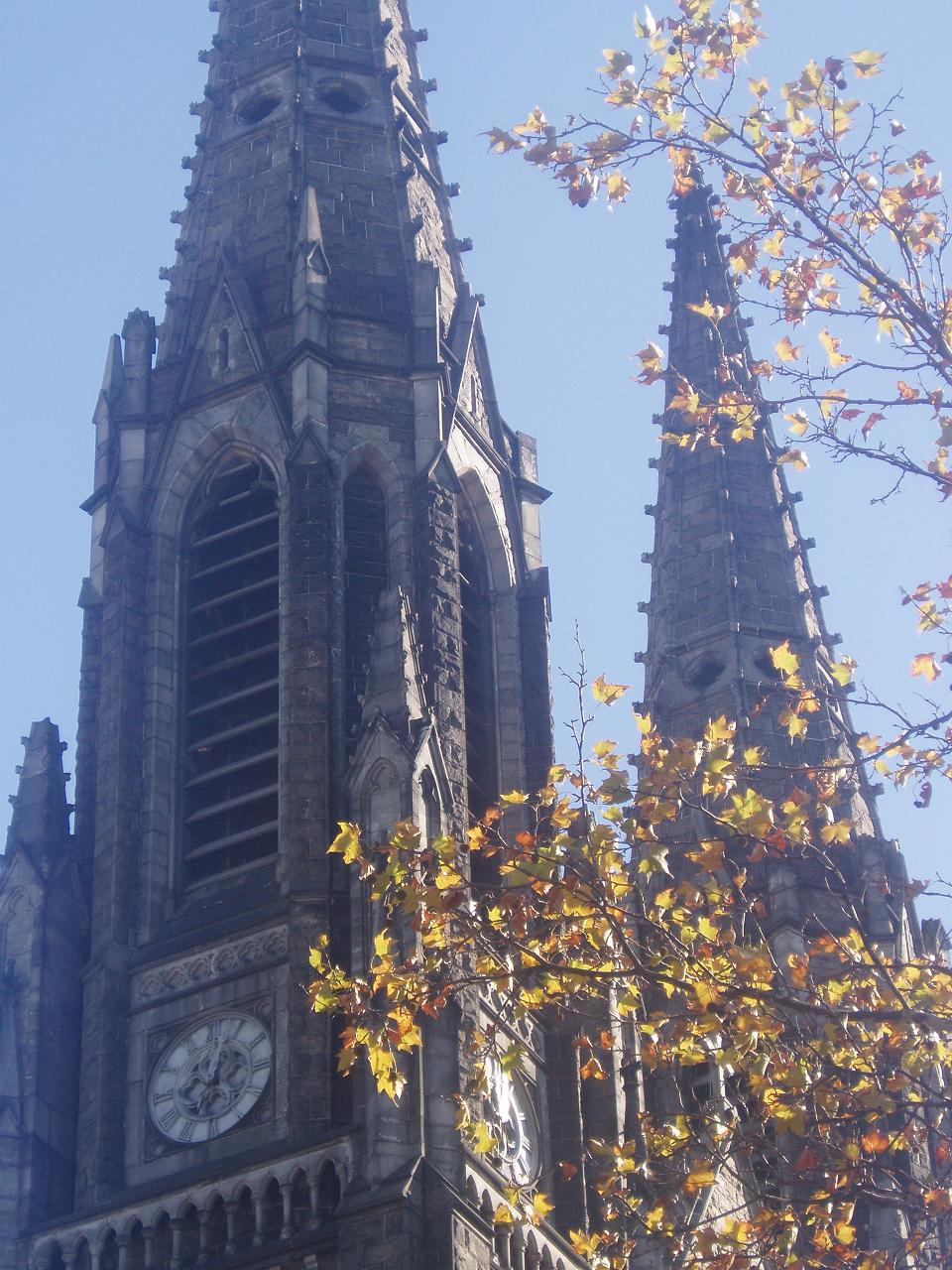
St. Patrick church steeples in Elizabethport

In the 2009–2010 school year, St. Patrick High School had an enrollment of 210 students and 16.8 faculty members (on an FTE basis), resulting in a student–teacher ratio of 12.5:1.

St. Patrick High School was closed in June 2012 by the Newark Archdiocese in the face of increasing costs and declining enrollment, despite the school's reputation as a basketball powerhouse.

After the school closed, the Elizabeth Public Schools occupied the school building with the new iPrep Academy School No. 8 starting in the 2013–14 school year.

=== The Patrick School ===
Following the closing of St. Patrick High School, administrators and parents affiliated with the defunct school opened a new independent private school located on Morris Avenue in Elizabeth called "The Patrick School" in September 2012.

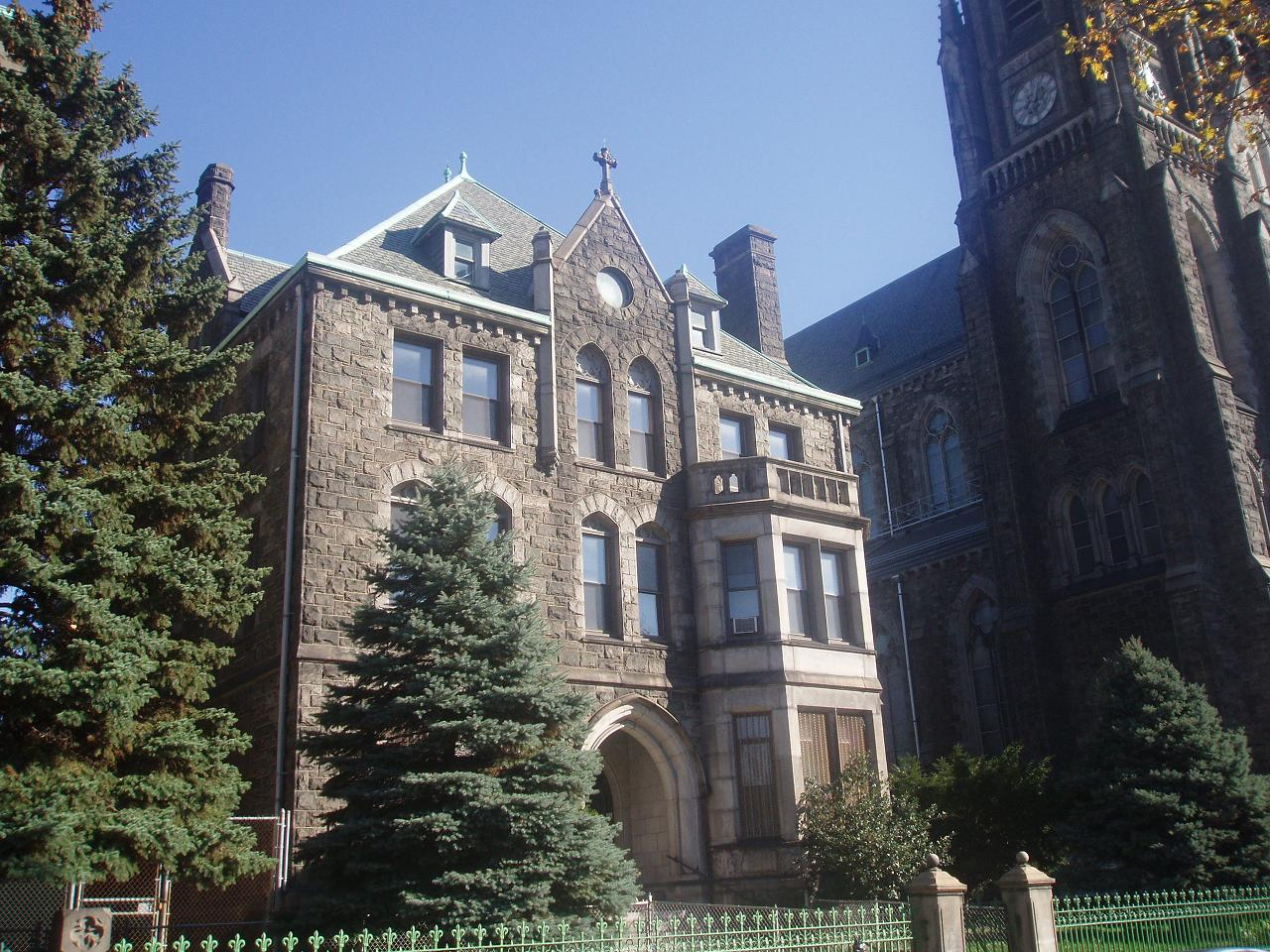
The rectory between St. Patrick High School Academy and the church, in Elizabethport

Despite being a new independent private school, the Patrick School retains a connection to the old St. Patrick High School, and its alumni base. In January 2018, NBA star Kyrie Irving, an alumnus of St. Patrick, donated a new gym to The Patrick School.

== Athletics ==
The Patrick School Celtics / Lady Celtics competed in basketball under the auspices of the New Jersey State Interscholastic Athletic Association (NJSIAA). The Patrick School lost its NJSIAA membership in December 2020, after it established more than one competitive basketball team.

St. Patrick High School's athletic program was most noted for a storied boys basketball program that has produced numerous college and professional level players. For nearly 20 years, under the direction of head coach Kevin Boyle, the team captured multiple NJSIAA sectional and state titles as well as five NJSIAA Tournament of Champions titles (1998, 2003, 2006, 2007 and 2009). They have gained recognition from multiple national media outlets and have been a staple in many national rankings, including the ESPN RISE Fab 50, USA Today Super 25, and the Max Preps Top 25.

The boys basketball team won the Non-Public Group C state championship in 1947 (against runner-up St. Rose High School in the playoff final), 1948 (vs. St. Rose), 1961 (vs. St. Joseph High School of Hammonton), 1966 (vs. Wildwood Catholic High School), 1967 (vs. Sacred Heart High School) and 1971 (vs. Sacred Heart), and won the Non-Public B title in 1998 (vs. Saint Augustine Preparatory School), 2000 (vs. St. Augustine), 2003 (vs. Cardinal McCarrick High School), 2005 (vs. Cardinal McCarrick) and 2006 (vs. Wildwood Catholic), 2007 (vs. Wildwood Catholic), 2016 (vs. Trenton Catholic Academy) and 2017 (vs. Hudson Catholic Regional High School). The program's 14 state titles are tied for second in the state.

The team 1967 pulled ahead early, building a 20-point lead by the middle of the second period and won the Parochial C state title, the program's fifth, with a 74–50 win against Sacred Heart in the championship game.

In 2000, the boys basketball team won the Parochial North B sectional title with a 77–56 win over Paterson Catholic High School in the tournament final.

In 2003, the boys basketball team won the Non-Public, North B sectional title with a 76–64 win against Paterson Catholic. The team advanced to take the Parochial Group B State championship with an 86–56 win against Cardinal McCarrick High School. The team took the title in the 2003 Boys Basketball Tournament of Champions, defeating Camden Catholic High School in the tournament final.

The team won the Non-Public, North B sectional title in 2005 with a 77–62 win against Paterson Catholic. The team fell short in the final game of the 2005 Boys Basketball Tournament of Champions, falling 63–60 to Seton Hall Preparatory School.

The team took the 2006 Non-Public Group B State Championship with an 83–57 win against Wildwood Catholic High School. The team won the 2006 Tournament of Champions with a 61–54 win against Linden High School. The team ended the season ranked 11th in the nation by USA Today in its final 2006 rankings.

The 2007 boys basketball team won the North B state sectional championship with a 62–46 win against St. Anthony High School. The team moved on to win the Non-Public Group B State Championship with an 85–56 victory against Wildwood Catholic. The team won the 2007 Boys Basketball Tournament of Champions for the second consecutive year with an 85–61 win over Bloomfield Tech High School; Corey Fisher (Villanova University) broke the NJSIAA Tournament of Champions final record by scoring 32 points. The team was ranked second in the nation by USA Today in its final rankings for 2007, falling just short of the top spot in the newspaper's calculations.

Coming on the heels of his team's second consecutive Tournament of Champions win, boys basketball head coach Kevin Boyle was selected as the 2007 Coach of the Year by USA Today. Through the 2007 season, Boyle had coached the team to a 407–120 record in his 19 seasons with the team, including a 58–6 record in the 2006 and 2007 seasons.

In 2009, the boys basketball team captured its third NJSIAA Tournament of Champions title in four years, beating Science Park High School 73–57, finishing one of the most successful seasons in the school's basketball history with a record of 30–3. The team was ranked No. 3 nationally in the ESPN Rise Fab 50 and #4 nationally in the USA Today Super 25. Along the way winning the Non-Public B North Sectional title beating Paterson Catholic 79–54, and the Non-Public B state title defeating Trenton Catholic Academy 76–62 at the Ritacco Centerin Toms River.

In 2010, the NJSIAA executive committee banned St. Patrick's boys basketball team from competing in the 2010 state tournament and suspended head coach Kevin Boyle for three games after it had come to light that the team had violated state regulations when Boyle had attended and been involved in unsanctioned off-season workouts. Guidelines stipulate that coaches are not allowed to be involved in basketball related activities prior to Thanksgiving Day, which according to the NJSIAA is the official start of the basketball season. These sessions were intentionally videotaped by a former state police officer hired by the NJSIAA. St. Patrick's argued that taping these events violated the players' constitutional rights, and were therefore unlawful evidence. Despite being unable to defend their 2009 Tournament of Champions title, the team had finished 26-3 including winning the MaxPreps Holiday Classic in San Diego.

== Notable alumni ==
- Bryce Aiken (born 1996, class of 2016), college basketball player for the Seton Hall Pirates
- Joe Alvarez (born 1956, class of 1974), Cuban American baseball manager and a former utility infielder in Minor League Baseball
- DeAndre' Bembry (born 1994, class of 2013), former small forward for the Brooklyn Nets
- Grant Billmeier (born 1984, class of 2003), former center for the Seton Hall University Pirates men's basketball team
- Derrick Caracter (born 1988, transferred), power forward/center, formerly for the Los Angeles Lakers basketball team, now with A.S. Ramat HaSharon of the Israeli Liga Leumit, played at St. Patrick for his freshman, junior and part of his senior year
- Samuel Dalembert (born 1981, class of 1999), Haitian-Canadian former professional basketball player for the Philadelphia 76ers, drafted out of Seton Hall University after his sophomore year
- Al-Amir Dawes (born 2001), basketball player
- Ángel Delgado (born 1994, class of 2014), Dominican professional basketball player for Galatasaray Ekmas of the Basketbol Süper Ligi
- John J. Fay Jr. (1927–2003), politician who served as a member of the New Jersey General Assembly and the New Jersey Senate
- Corey Fisher (born 1988, class of 2007), American-Georgian former point guard for Villanova University, now playing overseas
- Jamie Fox (1954-2017, class of 1973), New Jersey political appointee who served as Commissioner of the New Jersey Department of Transportation
- Derrick Gordon (born 1991, class of 2011), former college basketball player
- Al Harrington (born 1980, class of 1998), former professional basketball player for the Golden State Warriors, who jumped to the NBA directly from St. Patrick
- Joseph J. Higgins (1929–2007), politician who served in the New Jersey General Assembly from 1966 to 1974
- Shaheen Holloway (born 1976, class of 1996), college basketball coach and former professional player who is the head coach for the Seton Hall Pirates.
- Kyrie Irving (born 1992, class of 2010), point guard for the Dallas Mavericks
- Baden Jaxen (born 1990 as Dexter Strickland, class of 2009), former University of North Carolina basketball player, now playing professionally
- Dakari Johnson (born 1995, transferred), professional[basketball player who plays for the Qingdao DoubleStar Eagles of the Chinese Basketball Association
- Samson Johnson (born 2002, class of 2021), Togolese college basketball player for the UConn Huskies
- Michael Kidd-Gilchrist (born 1993, class of 2011), former professional basketball player
- Jonathan Kuminga (born 2002, class of 2020), Congolese basketball player for the Golden State Warriors
- Hervé Lamizana (born 1981, class of 2000), basketball player
- Cyril Langevine (born 1998), Guyanese–American professional basketball center in the Israeli Basketball Premier League
- Yves Mekongo Mbala (born 1987, class of 2006), basketball player
- James P. Mitchell (1900–1964), served as United States Secretary of Labor from 1953 to 1961 and ran unsuccessfully for Governor of New Jersey
- Thomas Mitchell (1892-1962), the first person to win the "triple crown" of acting awards (Oscar, Emmy, Tony); Uncle of James
- Mike Nardi (born 1985, class of 2003), former guard for Villanova University's basketball team, former professional basketball player overseas
- Markquis Nowell (born 1999, class of 2018), professional basketball player who played for the Toronto Raptors
- Nick Richards (born 1997, class of 2017), Jamaican former basketball player for the Kentucky Wildcats
- Jeff Robinson (born 1988), former professional basketball player for AZS Koszalin
- Adama Sanogo (born 2002, class of 2020), professional basketball player in the Israeli Basketball Premier League; previously for Chicago Bulls
- Quintrell Thomas (born 1990, class of 2008), professional basketball player for Ironi Kiryat Ata of the Israeli National League
- Jordan Walker (born 1999, class of 2017), basketball player for the Dallas Mavericks
