= 2016–17 Dartmouth Big Green men's basketball team =

American college basketball season

2016–17 Dartmouth Big Green men's basketball
- Conference: Ivy League
- Record: 7–20 (4–10 Ivy)
- Head coach: David McLaughlin (1st season)
- Assistant coaches: Pete Hutchins; James Cormier; Jabari Trotter
- Home arena: Leede Arena

2016–17 Ivy League men's basketball standings
| | Conf. | | | | Overall |
| Team | W | | L | PCT | W | | L | PCT |
|---|---|---|---|---|---|---|---|---|
| x-Princeton † | 14 | – | 0 | 1.000 | 23 | – | 7 | .767 |
| Harvard | 10 | – | 4 | .714 | 18 | – | 10 | .643 |
| Yale | 9 | – | 5 | .643 | 18 | – | 11 | .621 |
| Penn | 6 | – | 8 | .429 | 13 | – | 15 | .464 |
| Columbia | 5 | – | 9 | .357 | 11 | – | 16 | .407 |
| Brown | 4 | – | 10 | .286 | 13 | – | 17 | .433 |
| Cornell | 4 | – | 10 | .286 | 8 | – | 21 | .276 |
| Dartmouth | 4 | – | 10 | .286 | 7 | – | 20 | .259 |
† 2017 Ivy League Tournament winner x – Ivy League champions

The 2016–17 Dartmouth Big Green men's basketball team represented Dartmouth College during the 2016–17 NCAA Division I men's basketball season. The Big Green, led by first-year head coach David McLaughlin, played their home games at Leede Arena in Hanover, New Hampshire and were members of the Ivy League. They finished the season 7–20, 4–10 in Ivy League play to finish in a three-way tie for last place. They failed to qualify for the inaugural Ivy League tournament.

== Previous season ==
The Big Green finished the 2015–16 season with a 10–18 record overall and 4–10 in the conference.

On March 21, 2016 head coach Paul Cormier was fired. He finished at Dartmouth with a six-year record of 54–116. On April 25, the school hired David McLaughlin as head coach.

== Offseason ==
=== Departures ===
| Name | Number | Pos. | Height | Weight | Year | Hometown | Notes |
|---|---|---|---|---|---|---|---|
| Tommy Carpenter | 0 | F | 6'7" | 220 | Senior | Greensboro, NC | Graduated |
| Connor Boehm | 3 | F | 6'7" | 235 | Senior | Winnetka, IL | Graduated |
| Matt Rennie | 5 | F | 6'8" | 230 | Senior | North Brunswick, NJ | Graduated |
| Malik Gill | 10 | G | 5'9" | 175 | Senior | New Rochelle, NY | Graduated |
| Michael Stones | 11 | G | 6'2" | 170 | Freshman | Orlando, FL | Transferred to Palm Beach Atlantic |
| Kevin Crescemzi | 15 | G | 6'3" | 195 | Senior | North Palm Beach, FL | Graduated |
| Brandon McDonnell | 25 | F | 6'8" | 210 | Senior | Jackson, NJ | Graduated |
| Eli Harrison | 33 | F | 6'6" | 205 | Junior | Sisters, OR | Left the team to for personal reasons |

=== 2016 recruiting class ===
College recruiting information
| Name | Hometown | School | Height | Weight | Commit date |
|---|---|---|---|---|---|
| Ian Carter #72 PF | Gardena, CA | Junipero Serra High School | 6 ft 6 in (1.98 m) | 175 lb (79 kg) | Jul 1, 2015 |
| Ian Carter #72 PF | Recruit ratings: Scout: Rivals: (69) | | | | |
| Jonas Stakeliunas; PF | Basking Ridge, NJ | The Hill School | 6 ft 8 in (2.03 m) | 240 lb (110 kg) | Nov 28, 2015 |
| Jonas Stakeliunas; PF | Recruit ratings: Scout: Rivals: (58) | | | | |
| James Foye #111 SG | Hamilton, MA | Phillips Exeter Academy | 6 ft 4 in (1.93 m) | 185 lb (84 kg) | Aug 12, 2015 |
| James Foye #111 SG | Recruit ratings: Scout: Rivals: (57) | | | | |
| Ian Sistare; SG | Northfield, MA | Northfield-Mt. Hermon School | 6 ft 2 in (1.88 m) | 165 lb (75 kg) | |
| Ian Sistare; SG | Recruit ratings: Scout: Rivals: (NR) | | | | |
| Brendan Barry; SG | Rumson, NJ | Rumson Fair Haven High School | 6 ft 2 in (1.88 m) | 170 lb (77 kg) | |
| Brendan Barry; SG | Recruit ratings: Scout: Rivals: (NR) | | | | |
Overall recruit ranking:
Note: In many cases, Scout, Rivals, 247Sports, On3, and ESPN may conflict in their listings of height and weight.; In these cases, the average was taken. ESPN grades are on a 100-point scale.; Sources: "2016 Team Ranking". Rivals.

=== 2017 recruiting class ===
College recruiting information (2017)
| Name | Hometown | School | Height | Weight | Commit date |
|---|---|---|---|---|---|
| Chris Knight; PF | De Forest, WI | Madison Memorial High School | 6 ft 7 in (2.01 m) | 210 lb (95 kg) | Sep 6, 2016 |
| Chris Knight; PF | Recruit ratings: Scout: Rivals: (NR) | | | | |
Overall recruit ranking:
Note: In many cases, Scout, Rivals, 247Sports, On3, and ESPN may conflict in their listings of height and weight.; In these cases, the average was taken. ESPN grades are on a 100-point scale.; Sources: "2017 Team Ranking". Rivals.

== Roster ==
2016–17 Dartmouth Big Green men's basketball team
Players
Coaches
}

| Pos. | # | Name | Height | Weight | Year | Previous school | Hometown |
|---|---|---|---|---|---|---|---|
| F | 0 | Will Emery | 6 ft 9 in (2.06 m) | 215 lb (98 kg) | Fr | St. Ignatius | San Francisco, CA |
| G | 1 | Cameron Smith | 6 ft 1 in (1.85 m) | 180 lb (82 kg) | Jr | Miller School | Bristow, VA |
| F | 2 | Ike Ngwudo | 6 ft 6 in (1.98 m) | 205 lb (93 kg) | Sr | Milton Academy | Baldwin, NY |
| F | 3 | Ian Carter | 6 ft 7 in (2.01 m) | 205 lb (93 kg) | Fr | La Mirada | Los Angeles, CA |
| G | 4 | Taylor Johnson | 6 ft 4 in (1.93 m) | 180 lb (82 kg) | Jr | Northwest | Fort Worth, TX |
| G | 5 | Ian Sistare | 6 ft 3 in (1.91 m) | 195 lb (88 kg) | Fr | Northfield Mt. Hermon | Dublin, NH |
| G | 10 | James Foye | 6 ft 4 in (1.93 m) | 190 lb (86 kg) | Fr | Phillips Exeter | Hamilton, MA |
| F | 12 | Evan Boudreaux | 6 ft 8 in (2.03 m) | 220 lb (100 kg) | So | Lake Forest | Lake Forest, IL |
| G | 14 | Guilien Smith | 6 ft 2 in (1.88 m) | 200 lb (91 kg) | So | Catholic Memorial | West Roxbury, MA |
| G | 15 | Brendan Barry | 6 ft 2 in (1.88 m) | 170 lb (77 kg) | Fr | Rumson-Fair Haven | Red Bank, NJ |
| G | 20 | Mike Fleming | 6 ft 0 in (1.83 m) | 180 lb (82 kg) | Sr | Stevenson/Northfield Mt. Hermon | Lake Forest, IL |
| F | 21 | Wesley Dickinson | 6 ft 7 in (2.01 m) | 215 lb (98 kg) | Sr | Dwight-Englewood/Peddie School | Bergenfield, NJ |
| G | 22 | Miles Wright | 6 ft 5 in (1.96 m) | 210 lb (95 kg) | Jr | Tabor Academy | Boston, MA |
| G | 23 | Quinten Payne | 6 ft 5 in (1.96 m) | 200 lb (91 kg) | Sr | St. Charles North; Ball State | St. Charles, IL |
| F | 33 | Jonas Stakeliunas | 6 ft 8 in (2.03 m) | 220 lb (100 kg) | Fr | Gill St. Bernard's/Hill School | Klaipėda, Lithuanuia |
| C | 44 | Cole Harrison | 6 ft 11 in (2.11 m) | 245 lb (111 kg) | Sr | Montrose Christian | Brentwood, TN |

Head coach

- David McLaughlin (Colby)

Assistant coach(es)

- Pete Hutchins (Plymouth State)
- Mike Quinn (Bentley)
- Jabari Trotter (Dartmouth)

Legend

- (C) Team captain
- (S) Suspended
- (I) Ineligible
- (W) Walk-on
- Injured
- Current redshirt

Roster

== Schedule and results ==
| Date time, TV | Rank^{#} | Opponent^{#} | Result | Record | Site (attendance) city, state |
Non-conference regular season
| 11/11/2016*; 7:00 pm | | at No. 23 Rhode Island | L 61–84 | 0–1 | Ryan Center (6,052); Kingston, RI |
| 11/15/2016*; 7:00 pm | | Fairfield | L 62–79 | 0–2 | Leede Arena (433); Hanover, NH |
| 11/26/2016*; 3:00 pm | | Marist | L 69–75 | 0–3 | Leede Arena (1,215); Hanover, NH |
| 11/28/2016*; 7:00 pm | | at Longwood | L 80–86 | 0–4 | Willett Hall (1,018); Farmville, VA |
| 11/30/2016*; 7:00 pm | | at Old Dominion | L 47–59 | 0–5 | Ted Constant Convocation Center (5,260); Norfolk, VA |
| 12/03/2016*; 1:00 pm, ACCN Extra | | at Boston College | L 70–88 | 0–6 | Conte Forum (3,188); Chestnut Hill, MA |
| 12/07/2016*; 7:00 pm | | at Vermont | L 58–73 | 0–7 | Patrick Gym (2,186); Burlington, VT |
| 12/10/2016*; 7:00 pm | | Maine | L 68–73 | 0–8 | Leede Arena (682); Hanover, NH |
| 12/13/2016*; 7:00 pm | | at Hartford | L 66–70 | 0–9 | Chase Arena at Reich Family Pavilion (905); Hartford, CT |
| 12/18/2016*; 2:00 pm | | at LIU Brooklyn | W 82–68 | 1–9 | Steinberg Wellness Center (1,052); Brooklyn, NY |
| 12/22/2016*; 11:00 am | | at Bryant | W 75–69 | 2–9 | Chace Athletic Center (776); Smithfield, RI |
| 12/31/2016*; 2:00 pm | | New Hampshire; Rivalry | W 63–62 | 3–9 | Leede Arena (701); Hanover, NH |
| 01/03/2017*; 7:00 pm | | Cal State Bakersfield | L 60–64 | 3–10 | Leede Arena (400); Hanover, NH |
Ivy League regular season
| 01/07/2017; 7:00 pm | | Harvard | L 58–74 | 3–11 (0–1) | Leede Arena (1,252); Hanover, NH |
| 01/21/2017; 2:00 pm | | at Harvard | L 68–82 | 3–12 (0–2) | Lavietes Pavilion (2,195); Cambridge, MA |
| 01/27/2017; 7:00 pm | | at Columbia | L 54–66 | 3–13 (0–3) | Levien Gymnasium (1,274); New York City, NY |
| 01/28/2017; 6:00 pm | | at Cornell | L 62–75 | 3–14 (0–4) | Newman Arena (3,103); Ithaca, NY |
| 02/03/2017; 7:00 pm | | Princeton | L 64–69 | 3–15 (0–5) | Leede Arena (862); Hanover, NH |
| 02/04/2017; 7:00 pm | | Penn | W 74–71 | 4–15 (1–5) | Leede Arena (951); Hanover, NH |
| 02/10/2017; 7:00 pm | | at Yale | L 64–73 | 4–16 (1–6) | John J. Lee Amphitheater (1,284); New Haven, CT |
| 02/11/2017; 6:00 pm | | at Brown | W 77–74 | 5–16 (2–6) | Pizzitola Sports Center (1,104); Providence, RI |
| 02/17/2017; 7:00 pm | | Cornell | L 65–69 | 5–17 (2–7) | Leede Arena (621); Hanover, NH |
| 02/18/2017; 7:00 pm, ESPN3 | | Columbia | W 80–79 ^{OT} | 6–17 (3–7) | Leede Arena (829); Hanover, NH |
| 02/24/2017; 7:00 pm | | Brown | L 75–80 | 6–18 (3–8) | Leede Arena (608); Hanover, NH |
| 02/25/2017; 7:00 pm, ESPN3 | | Yale | L 86–99 | 6–19 (3–9) | Leede Arena (937); Hanover, NH |
| 03/03/2017; 7:00 pm | | at Penn | W 76–74 | 7–19 (4–9) | Palestra (8,722); Philadelphia, PA |
| 03/04/2017; 6:00 pm, ESPN3 | | at Princeton | L 48–85 | 7–20 (4–10) | Jadwin Gymnasium (3,087); Princeton, NJ |
*Non-conference game. ^{#}Rankings from AP Poll. (#) Tournament seedings in parentheses. All times are in Eastern Time Source.
