= Myles Stephens =

American basketball player

Personal information
- Born: January 1, 1997 (age 29)
- Listed height: 6 ft 5 in (1.96 m)
- Listed weight: 210 lb (95 kg)

Career information
- High school: The Pennington School (Pennington, New Jersey); St. Andrew's School (Middletown, Delaware)
- College: Princeton (2015–2019)
- NBA draft: 2019: undrafted
- Playing career: 2019–2024
- Position: Shooting guard / small forward

Career history
- 2019–2020: Oldenburger TB
- 2020–2021: Vilpas Vikings
- 2021–2022: Kangoeroes Mechelen
- 2022–2023: Crailsheim Merlins
- 2023–2024: Dolomiti Energia Trento

Career highlights
- BNXT League Dream Team (2022); Ivy League Defensive Player of the Year (2017); 2× First-team All-Ivy League (2017, 2019); Second-team All-Ivy League (2018); Ivy League tournament MOP (2017)

Myles Stephens (born January 1, 1997) is an American former professional basketball player. He played college basketball at Princeton University.

== Early life and high school ==
Stephens grew up in the Lawrenceville section of Lawrence Township, Mercer County, New Jersey and attended The Pennington School before transferring to St. Andrew's School in Middletown, Delaware after his sophomore year. He committed to play college basketball at Princeton over offers from Brown, Columbia, Holy Cross, Penn, Seton Hall, Cornell and Yale.

== College career ==
Stephens came off the bench as a freshman and averaged 5.5 points in 29 games played. As a sophomore, Stephens was named first team All-Ivy League and the conference Defensive Player of the Year averaged 12.5 points and 4.6 rebounds per game and blocked 22 shots. He was named second team All-Ivy after averaging 15.3 points and 6.3 rebounds in his junior season. Stephens was named first team All-Ivy as a senior after averaging 13.6 points and 6.4 rebounds per game.

== Professional career ==
Stephens signed with Oldenburger TB of the German ProB on December 7, 2019.

Stephens signed with the Vilpas Vikings of the Finnish Korisliiga for the 2020–2021 season. He averaged 12.7 points and 5.9 rebounds on the season.

Stephens signed with Belgian team Kangoeroes Mechelen of the BNXT League on September 3, 2021.

On July 18, 2022, he has signed with Crailsheim Merlins of the Basketball Bundesliga (BBL).

On August 3, 2023, he signed with Dolomiti Energia Trento of the Italian Lega Basket Serie A (LBA).
