= Bryce Aiken =

American basketball player (born 1996)

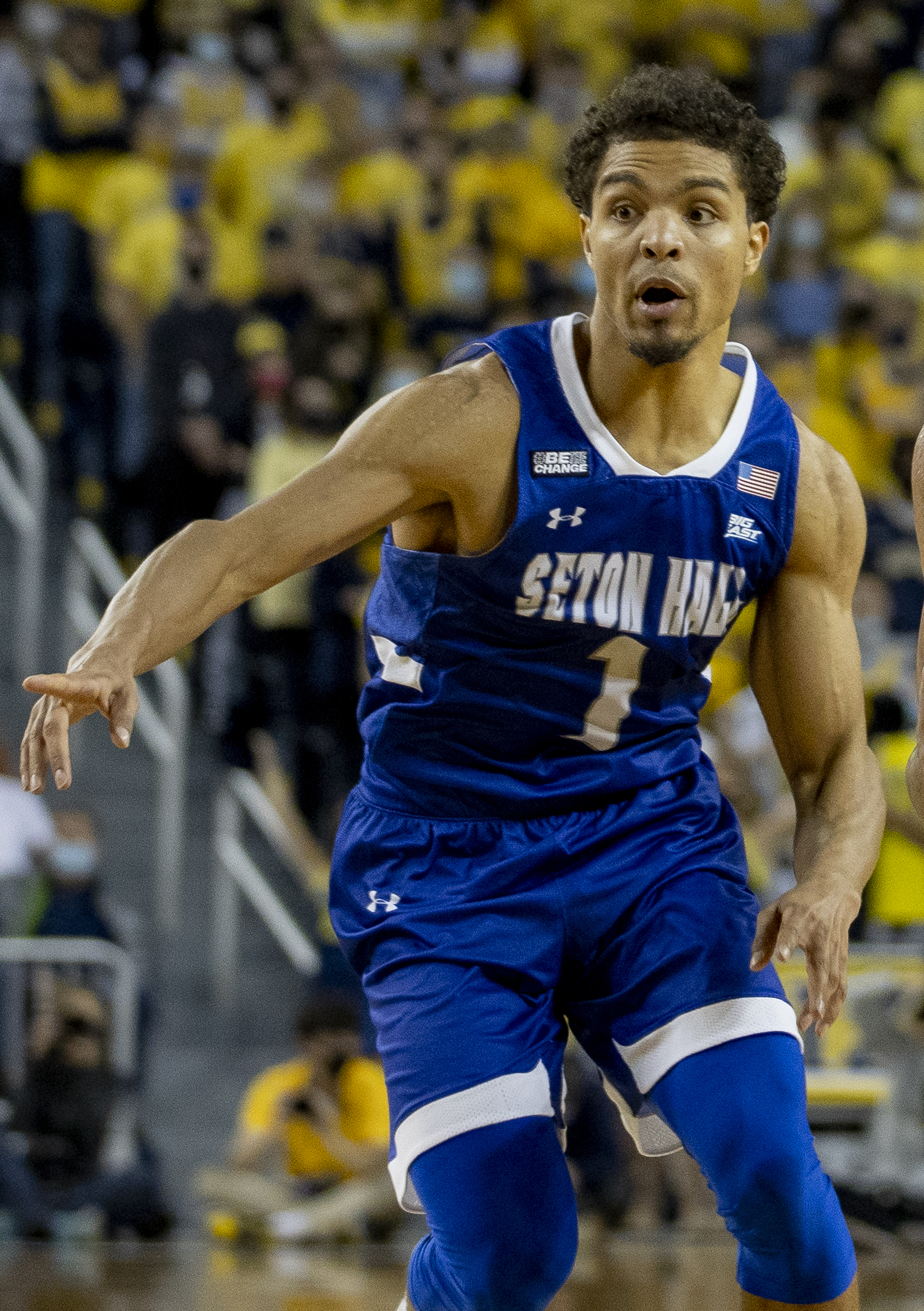
- Aiken with Seton Hall in 2021

Personal information
- Born: December 14, 1996 (age 29)
- Listed height: 6 ft 0 in (1.83 m)
- Listed weight: 180 lb (82 kg)

Career information
- High school: Pope John XXIII (Sparta, New Jersey); The Patrick School (Hillside, New Jersey)
- College: Harvard (2016–2020); Seton Hall (2020–2022)
- Position: Point guard
- Number: 1

Career highlights
- 2× First-team All-Ivy League (2017, 2019); Ivy League Rookie of the Year (2017)

Bryce Aiken (born December 14, 1996) is an American basketball player. He previously played college basketball for the Seton Hall Pirates of the Big East Conference and the Harvard Crimson.

== High school career ==
Raised in Randolph, New Jersey, Aiken played basketball during his freshman year at Pope John XXIII Regional High School in Sparta, New Jersey. While attending Pope John, he became friends with National Basketball Association player Kyrie Irving. For his sophomore year, Aiken transferred to The Patrick School, Irving's former team, in Hillside, New Jersey. He averaged 10.8 points per game as a senior and helped his team to a 64–18 record over three years, including a runner-up finish at the City of Palms Classic. On the Amateur Athletic Union (AAU) circuit, he played for the PSA Cardinals. On October 8, 2015, Aiken committed to play college basketball for Harvard over offers from Miami (Florida) and Seton Hall. He was a consensus four-star recruit and was ranked among the top 100 players in the 2016 class by 247Sports and ESPN.

== College career ==
As a freshman, Aiken was named Ivy League Rookie of the Year and First Team All-Ivy. His 14.5 points per game average was the highest for a Harvard freshman since 1988. He averaged 14.1 points per game as a sophomore. Aiken suffered a left knee injury in loss to Columbia on February 2, 2018, that required offseason surgery. He missed the nonconference section of his junior season before returning on January 21, 2019, against Howard and finished with 16 points. On February 8, Aiken scored a career-high 44 points in a 98–96 triple overtime win over Columbia. As a junior, Aiken averaged 22.2 points, 2.9 rebounds. and 2.6 assists per game on a team that finished 19–12 and lost to NC State in the second round of the NIT. He was named to the First Team All-Ivy League. Coming into his senior season, Aiken was named to the Naismith and Bob Cousy Award watchlists. He scored his 1,000th career point on November 22 in a 82–74 win over Holy Cross and finished with 32 points, hitting 5 of 7 three-pointers. Aiken played just seven games during the 2019–20 season before being sidelined with a season-ending injury. Aiken averaged 16.7 points and 1.7 assists per game in those seven games. On April 9, 2020, Aiken announced that he would transfer to Seton Hall for his senior season, choosing the Pirates over Maryland, Michigan and Iowa State.

After an injury-plagued senior season, Aiken took advantage of the additional year of eligibility granted by the NCAA due to the COVID-19 pandemic. He sprained his ankle in Seton Hall's season-opening loss to Louisville on November 27, and was ruled out for two weeks. On January 15, 2022, he sustained a concussion during a 73–72 loss to Marquette and was ruled out indefinitely. On March 2, Aiken was officially announced to be out for the season. He averaged 14.5 points and 2.7 assists per game.

== Career statistics ==
Legend
GP	Games played	GS	Games started	MPG	Minutes per game
FG%	Field goal percentage	3P%	3-point field goal percentage	FT%	Free throw percentage
RPG	Rebounds per game	APG	Assists per game	SPG	Steals per game
BPG	Blocks per game	PPG	Points per game	**Bold**	Career high

=== College ===
Year	Team	GP	GS	MPG	FG%	3P%	FT%	RPG	APG	SPG	BPG	PPG
2016–17	Harvard	**26**	9	27.8	.395	.349	.884	2.2	2.8	.8	.0	14.5
2017–18	Harvard	14	9	27.7	.375	.235	.807	2.1	**2.9**	.3	.0	14.1
2018–19	Harvard	18	**17**	**32.8**	.434	**.398**	.855	**2.9**	2.6	1.2	.0	**22.2**
2019–20	Harvard	7	6	25.6	.412	.361	.872	1.9	1.7	**1.3**	.0	16.7
2020–21	Seton Hall	14	0	14.4	.319	.270	**.889**	.9	1.5	.4	.0	5.7
2021–22	Seton Hall	15	6	26.2	**.448**	.353	.825	2.1	2.7	**1.3**	.0	14.5
Career		94	47	26.3	.406	.342	.851	2.1	2.5	.9	.0	14.8

== Personal life ==
Aiken's father, Daryl, ran track and field for the University of Connecticut, where Aiken's mother, Diana, was a gymnast. His two older brothers played college basketball: Kyle for Lincoln University and Julian for Assumption College.
