= 2016–17 New Hampshire Wildcats men's basketball team =

American college basketball season

2016–17 New Hampshire Wildcats men's basketball
- Conference: America East Conference
- Record: 20–12 (10–6 America East)
- Head coach: Bill Herrion (12th season)
- Assistant coaches: Kenneth Dempsey; Chris Mohr; Josh King
- Home arena: Lundholm Gym

2016–17 America East Conference men's basketball standings
	Conf.				Overall
Team	W		L	PCT	W		L	PCT
Vermont †	16	–	0	1.000	29	–	6	.829
Stony Brook	12	–	4	.750	18	–	14	.563
Albany	10	–	6	.625	21	–	14	.600
New Hampshire	10	–	6	.625	20	–	12	.625
UMBC	9	–	7	.563	21	–	13	.618
UMass Lowell*	5	–	11	.313	11	–	20	.355
Hartford	4	–	12	.250	9	–	23	.281
Binghamton	3	–	13	.188	12	–	20	.375
Maine	3	–	13	.188	7	–	25	.219
† 2017 America East tournament winner * Ineligible for postseason during transition to Division I.

The 2016–17 New Hampshire Wildcats men's basketball team represented the University of New Hampshire during the 2016–17 NCAA Division I men's basketball season. The Wildcats, led by 12th-year head coach Bill Herrion, played their home games at Lundholm Gym in Durham, New Hampshire as members of the America East Conference. They finished the season 20–12, 10–6 in America East play to finish in a tie for third place. As the No. 4 seed in the America East tournament, they defeated UMBC in the quarterfinals before losing to Vermont in the semifinals.

== Previous season ==
The Wildcats finished the 2015–16 season 20–13, 11–5 in America East play to finish in a tie for third place. They defeated Binghamton in the quarterfinals of the America East tournament where they lost to Vermont. They received an invitation to the CollegeInsider.com Tournament where they defeated Fairfield before losing to Coastal Carolina in the second round.

== Preseason ==
New Hampshire was picked to finish second in the preseason America East poll. Tanner Leissner, Jr. was selected to the preseason All-America East team.

== Departures ==
Name	Number	Pos.	Height	Weight	Year	Hometown	Notes
Andrew Dotson	2	G	6'2"	175	Freshman	Arlington, TX	Transferred to Spring Hill
Frank Okeke	12	F	6'6"	220	Senior	DeSoto, TX	Graduated
Ronnel Jordan	23	G/F	6'3"	194	Senior	San Antonio, TX	Graduated
Pat McNamara	24	G	6'5"	190	Freshman	Arlington Heights, IL	Transferred to Fairleigh Dickinson

=== Incoming transfers ===
Name	Number	Pos.	Height	Weight	Year	Hometown	Previous School
Darryl Stewart Jr.	2	G	6'2"	185	Junior	Atlanta, GA	Junior college transferred from Tyler JC

== 2016 incoming recruits ==
College recruiting information
Name	Hometown	School	Height	Weight	Commit date
John Ogwuche; SG	Decatur, GA	Greenforest Christian Academy	6 ft 2 in (1.88 m)	180 lb (82 kg)	Oct 3, 2015
John Ogwuche; SG	Recruit ratings: Scout: Rivals: (NR)				
Luke Rosinski; PF	Derry, NH	Kimball Union Academy	6 ft 8 in (2.03 m)	N/A	
Luke Rosinski; PF	Recruit ratings: Scout: Rivals: (NR)				
Chris Lester; PF	Barrington, IL	Standard of Excellence Academy	6 ft 8 in (2.03 m)	220 lb (100 kg)	
Chris Lester; PF	Recruit ratings: Scout: Rivals: (NR)				
Overall recruit ranking:
Note: In many cases, Scout, Rivals, 247Sports, On3, and ESPN may conflict in their listings of height and weight.; In these cases, the average was taken. ESPN grades are on a 100-point scale.; Sources: "2016 Team Ranking". Rivals.

== Roster ==
2016–17 New Hampshire Wildcats men's basketball team
Players
Coaches

Pos.	#	Name	Height	Weight	Year	Previous school	Hometown
G	0	Jaleen Smith	6 ft 4 in (1.93 m)	205 lb (93 kg)	Sr	Brazosport	Freeport, TX
G	2	Darryl Stewart	6 ft 1 in (1.85 m)	185 lb (84 kg)	Jr	Holy Innocents; Tyler JC	Atlanta, GA
F	3	Jacoby Armstrong	6 ft 7 in (2.01 m)	230 lb (104 kg)	Sr	Wylie	Dallas, TX
G	4	Keon Burns (W)	6 ft 4 in (1.93 m)	205 lb (93 kg)	RS Jr	Westview/Phillips Exeter Academy	Beaverton, OR
G	5	Daniel Dion	6 ft 0 in (1.83 m)	175 lb (79 kg)	Sr	Vista Ridge	Cedar Park, TX
G	10	John Ogwuche	6 ft 1 in (1.85 m)	190 lb (86 kg)	Fr	Greenforst McCalep	Makurdi, Nigeria
G	11	Jordan Reed	6 ft 0 in (1.83 m)	190 lb (86 kg)	RS So	Lovejoy; Rice	Lucas, TX
F	12	Iba Camara	6 ft 9 in (2.06 m)	230 lb (104 kg)	Jr	Admiral Farragut Academy/St. Paul's	Dakar, Senegal
G	14	Kijana Love	6 ft 1 in (1.85 m)	170 lb (77 kg)	Fr	Steele	Cibolo, TX
F	21	Tanner Leissner	6 ft 7 in (2.01 m)	230 lb (104 kg)	Jr	Judson	Converse, TX
F	22	David Watkins	6 ft 8 in (2.03 m)	225 lb (102 kg)	So	Brimmer and May	Dorchester, MA
F	23	Chris Lester	6 ft 6 in (1.98 m)	225 lb (102 kg)	Fr	Barrington	Barrington, IL
G	30	Joe Bramanti	6 ft 2 in (1.88 m)	205 lb (93 kg)	RS Sr	Brewster Academy; Wright State	Andover, MA
F	44	Luke Rosinkski	6 ft 8 in (2.03 m)	235 lb (107 kg)	Fr	Kimball Union Academy	Derry, NH

Head coach

- Bill Herrion (Merrimack)

Assistant coach(es)

- Kenneth Dempsey (Moravian)
- Chris Mohr (Merrimack)
- Josh King (Eckerd)

Legend

- (C) Team captain
- (S) Suspended
- (I) Ineligible
- (W) Walk-on
- Injured
- Current redshirt

Roster

== Schedule and results ==
Date time, TV	Rank^{#}	Opponent^{#}	Result	Record	Site (attendance) city, state
Non-conference regular season
11/11/2016*; 1:00 pm		Lesley	W 85–60	1–0	Lundholm Gym (632); Durham, NH
11/14/2016*; 7:00 pm, ESPN3		at Temple; NIT Season Tip-Off	W 57–52	2–0	Liacouras Center (4,893); Philadelphia, PA
11/17/2016*; 7:00 pm		Abilene Christian	L 57–65	2–2	Lundholm Gym (473); Durham, NH
11/20/2016*; 1:00 pm, RTPT		at No. 19 West Virginia; NIT Season Tip-Off	L 41–100	2–2	WVU Coliseum (8,842); Morgantown, WV
11/23/2016*; 2:00 pm		Detroit; NIT Season Tip-Off	W 86–70	3–2	Lundholm Gym (477); Durham, NH
11/27/2016*; 2:00 pm		at Winthrop; NIT Season Tip-Off	W 65–60	4–2	Winthrop Coliseum (992); Rock Hill, SC
11/30/2016*; 6:30 pm, FS2		at Providence	L 62–76	4–3	Dunkin' Donuts Center (4,801); Providence, RI
12/03/2016*; 7:00 pm		Holy Cross	W 56–53	5–3	Lundholm Gym (612); Durham, NH
12/06/2016*; 7:30 pm		at American	W 80–70	6–3	Bender Arena (474); Washington, D.C.
12/10/2016*; 3:00 pm		at Bryant	W 86–73	7–3	Chace Athletic Center (593); Smithfield, RI
12/18/2016*; 1:00 pm		at Boston University	L 69–73	7–4	Case Gym (321); Boston, MA
12/21/2016*; 7:00 pm, ESPN3		Daniel Webster	W 89–26	8–4	Lundholm Gym (655); Durham, NH
12/31/2016*; 2:00 pm		at Dartmouth; Rivalry	L 62–63	9–4	Leede Arena (701); Hanover, NH
01/02/2017*; 7:00 pm		Wheelock	W 95–50	9–5	Lundholm Gym (524); Durham, NH
America East regular season
01/05/2017; 7:00 pm, ESPN3		Stony Brook	L 56–59	9–6 (0–1)	Lundholm Gym (624); Durham, NH
01/11/2017; 7:00 pm		at Albany	W 75–67	10–6 (1–1)	SEFCU Arena (2,318); Albany, NY
01/14/2017; 1:00 pm		Binghamton	W 73–66	11–6 (2–1)	Lundholm Gym (682); Durham, NH
01/16/2017; 1:00 pm, ESPN3		Vermont	L 59–71	11–7 (2–2)	Lundholm Gym (881); Durham, NH
01/19/2017; 7:00 pm		at Maine	W 74–63	12–7 (3–2)	Cross Insurance Center; Bangor, ME
01/22/2017; 1:00 pm		at Hartford	W 81–56	13–7 (4–2)	Chase Arena at Reich Family Pavilion (931); Hartford, CT
01/25/2017; 7:00 pm, ESPN3		UMass Lowell	W 80–71	14–7 (5–2)	Lundholm Gym (826); Durham, NH
01/28/2017; 1:00 pm		at UMBC	L 103–105 ^{2OT}	14–8 (5–3)	Retriever Activities Center (898); Catonsville, MD
02/01/2017; 7:00 pm, ESPN3		at Stony Brook	L 61–64	14–9 (5–4)	Island Federal Credit Union Arena (3,347); Stony Brook, NY
02/06/2017; 7:00 pm, ESPN3		Albany	L 55–69	14–10 (5–5)	Lundholm Gym (685); Durham, NH
02/09/2017; 9:00 pm, ESPNU		at Vermont	L 74–82	14–11 (5–6)	Patrick Gym (1,775); Burlington, VT
02/12/2017; 2:00 pm, ESPN3		at Binghamton	W 63–55	15–11 (6–6)	Binghamton University Events Center (2,074); Vestal, NY
02/15/2017; 7:00 pm, ESPN3		Maine	W 64–51	16–11 (7–6)	Lundholm Gym (739); Durham, NH
02/18/2017; 1:00 pm, ESPN3		Hartford	W 82–52	17–11 (8–6)	Lundholm Gym (827); Durham, NH
02/22/2017; 7:00 pm, ESPN3		at UMass Lowell	W 78–67	18–11 (9–6)	Tsongas Center (3,779); Lowell, MA
02/25/2017; 12:00 pm, ESPN3		UMBC	W 94–90 ^{2OT}	19–11 (10–6)	Lundholm Gym (1,328); Durham, NH
America East tournament
03/01/2017; 7:30 pm, ESPN3	(4)	(5) UMBC; Quarterfinals	W 74–65	20–11	Lundholm Gym (1,473); Durham, NH
03/06/2017; 7:00 pm, ESPN3	(4)	at (1) Vermont; Semifinals	L 41–74	20–12	Patrick Gym (3,266); Burlington, VT
*Non-conference game. ^{#}Rankings from AP Poll. (#) Tournament seedings in parentheses. All times are in Eastern Time.
