= 2016–17 Albany Great Danes men's basketball team =

American college basketball season

2016–17 Albany Great Danes men's basketball

CIT, First Round
- Conference: America East Conference
- Record: 21–14 (10–6 America East)
- Head coach: Will Brown (16th season)
- Assistant coaches: Chad O'Donnell; Jon Iati; Josh Pelletier
- Home arena: SEFCU Arena

2016–17 America East Conference men's basketball standings
| | Conf. | | | | Overall |
| Team | W | | L | PCT | W | | L | PCT |
|---|---|---|---|---|---|---|---|---|
| Vermont † | 16 | – | 0 | 1.000 | 29 | – | 6 | .829 |
| Stony Brook | 12 | – | 4 | .750 | 18 | – | 14 | .563 |
| Albany | 10 | – | 6 | .625 | 21 | – | 14 | .600 |
| New Hampshire | 10 | – | 6 | .625 | 20 | – | 12 | .625 |
| UMBC | 9 | – | 7 | .563 | 21 | – | 13 | .618 |
| UMass Lowell* | 5 | – | 11 | .313 | 11 | – | 20 | .355 |
| Hartford | 4 | – | 12 | .250 | 9 | – | 23 | .281 |
| Binghamton | 3 | – | 13 | .188 | 12 | – | 20 | .375 |
| Maine | 3 | – | 13 | .188 | 7 | – | 25 | .219 |
† 2017 America East tournament winner * Ineligible for postseason during transition to Division I.

The 2016–17 Albany Great Danes men's basketball team represented the University at Albany, SUNY during the 2016–17 NCAA Division I men's basketball season. The Great Danes, led by 16th-year head coach Will Brown, played their home games at SEFCU Arena as members of the America East Conference. They finished the season 21–14, 10–6 in America East play to finish in a tie for third place. Due to tiebreakers, they received the No. 3 seed in the America East tournament where they defeated Hartford and Stony Brook to advance to the Championship game where they lost to Vermont. They were invited to the CollegeInsider.com Postseason Tournament where they lost in the first round to Saint Peter's.

== Previous season ==
The Great Danes finished the 2015–16 season 24–9, 13–3 in America East play to finish in second place. They lost in the quarterfinals of the America East tournament to Hartford. They were invited to the College Basketball Invitational where they lost in the first round to Ohio.

== Preseason ==
Albany was picked to finish third in the preseason America East poll. Joe Cremo was selected to the preseason All-America East team.

== Departures ==
| Name | Number | Pos. | Height | Weight | Year | Hometown | Notes |
|---|---|---|---|---|---|---|---|
| Evan Singletary | 0 | G | 6'1" | 195 | Senior | Baltimore, MD | Graduated |
| Ray Sanders | 1 | G | 6'4" | 210 | Senior | Tuscaloosa, AL | Graduated |
| Chas Brown | 11 | F | 6'8" | 220 | Junior | Baltimore, MD | Transferred to Coppin State |
| Peter Hooley | 12 | G | 6'4" | 200 | Senior | Hahndorf, Australia | Graduated |
| Reece Williams | 13 | G | 6'1" | 200 | Senior | White Plains, NY | Graduated |
| Richard Peters | 22 | C | 6'11" | 275 | RS Junior | Pickering, ON | Graduate transferred to Cal State Fullerton |
| Kyle McKinley | 34 | F/C | 6'10" | 220 | Freshman | Stillwater, MN | Transferred to Northeast CC |

=== Incoming transfers ===
| Name | Number | Pos. | Height | Weight | Year | Hometown | Previous School |
|---|---|---|---|---|---|---|---|
| Xavier Cochran | 0 | G | 6'5" | 195 | Sophomore | Ann Arbor, MI | Junior college transferred from Owens CC |
| Terrel Martin-Garcia | 14 | F | 6'6" | 240 | Junior | Catford, England | Junior college transferred from Missouri State–West Plains |
| Jaraan Lands | 23 | F | 6'6" | 240 | Junior | Brownsville, IN | Junior college transferred from Eastern Arizona College |

== 2016 incoming recruits ==
Albany did not have any incoming players in the 2016 recruiting class.

=== 2017 incoming recruits ===
College recruiting information (2017)
| Name | Hometown | School | Height | Weight | Commit date |
|---|---|---|---|---|---|
| Brent Hank; C | Port Lincoln, Australia | Trinity College | 6 ft 10 in (2.08 m) | 235 lb (107 kg) | Jul 26, 2016 |
| Brent Hank; C | Recruit ratings: Scout: Rivals: (NR) | | | | |
| Cameron Healy; PG | Wahroonga, Australia | Montverde Academy Prep | 6 ft 3 in (1.91 m) | 185 lb (84 kg) | |
| Cameron Healy; PG | Recruit ratings: Scout: Rivals: (NR) | | | | |
| Adam Lulka; PF | Sydney, Australia | The King's School | 6 ft 8 in (2.03 m) | 230 lb (100 kg) | Aug 26, 2016 |
| Adam Lulka; PF | Recruit ratings: Scout: Rivals: (NR) | | | | |
Overall recruit ranking:
Note: In many cases, Scout, Rivals, 247Sports, On3, and ESPN may conflict in their listings of height and weight.; In these cases, the average was taken. ESPN grades are on a 100-point scale.; Sources: "2017 Team Ranking". Rivals.

== Roster ==
2016–17 Albany Great Danes men's basketball team
Players
Coaches

| Pos. | # | Name | Height | Weight | Year | Previous school | Hometown |
|---|---|---|---|---|---|---|---|
| G | 0 | Xavier Cochran | 6 ft 6 in (1.98 m) | 195 lb (88 kg) | So | Huron; Owens CC | Ann Arbor, MI |
| G | 1 | Costa Anderson | 6 ft 2 in (1.88 m) | 200 lb (91 kg) | Jr | South Atlanta; Northern Oklahoma College | Atlanta, GA |
| G | 2 | Jamir Andrews | 6 ft 3 in (1.91 m) | 205 lb (93 kg) | Sr | Dublin; Sheridan College | Livermore, CA |
| G | 3 | Joe Cremo | 6 ft 4 in (1.93 m) | 190 lb (86 kg) | So | Scotia-Glenville | Scotia, NY |
| F | 10 | Mike Rowley | 6 ft 8 in (2.03 m) | 230 lb (104 kg) | Sr | Knox Grammar School | Sydney, Australia |
| G | 11 | Marqueese Grayson | 6 ft 2 in (1.88 m) | 200 lb (91 kg) | Jr | Tomball; Gillette College | Tomball, TX |
| F | 12 | Devonte Campbell | 6 ft 6 in (1.98 m) | 225 lb (102 kg) | Jr | Culver Academy; Missouri State–West Plains | Vaughan, Ontario |
| G | 13 | David Nichols | 6 ft 0 in (1.83 m) | 185 lb (84 kg) | So | Midwest Elite Prep | South Holland, IL |
| F | 14 | Terrel Martin-Garcia | 6 ft 6 in (1.98 m) | 240 lb (109 kg) | Jr | Haberdashers Knights Academy; Missouri State–West Plains | Catford, England |
| G | 22 | Nick Fruscio (W) | 5 ft 10 in (1.78 m) | 155 lb (70 kg) | Fr | Albany Academy | Albany, NY |
| F | 23 | Jarran Lands | 6 ft 7 in (2.01 m) | 245 lb (111 kg) | Jr | Brownsburg; Eastern Arizona | Brownsburg, IN |
| F | 24 | Dallas Ennema | 6 ft 6 in (1.98 m) | 210 lb (95 kg) | Sr | Sheldon | Sheldon, IA |
| F | 30 | Travis Charles | 6 ft 6 in (1.98 m) | 235 lb (107 kg) | RS Jr | Lincoln; Howard College | Brooklyn, New York |
| F | 43 | Greig Stire | 6 ft 7 in (2.01 m) | 240 lb (109 kg) | Jr | Christian Brothers Academy | Schenectady, NY |

Head coach

- Will Brown (Dowling)

Assistant coach(es)

- Jon Iati (Albany)
- Josh Pelletier (Saint Rose)
- Jared Knotts (Albany)

Legend

- (C) Team captain
- (S) Suspended
- (I) Ineligible
- (W) Walk-on
- Injured
- Current redshirt

Roster

== Schedule and results ==
| Date time, TV | Rank^{#} | Opponent^{#} | Result | Record | High points | High rebounds | High assists | Site (attendance) city, state |
Non-conference regular season
| 11/11/2016*; 7:00 pm, ESPN3 | | at Penn State; Hall of Fame Tip Off | W 87–81 | 1–0 | 22 – Cremo | 10 – Cremo | 5 – Cremo | Bryce Jordan Center (6,230); University Park, PA |
| 11/14/2016*; 7:00 pm, ESPNU | | at No. 24 Cincinnati; Hall of Fame Tip Off | L 51–74 | 1–1 | 13 – Nichols | 6 – Tied | 6 – Nichols | Fifth Third Arena (5,863); Cincinnati, OH |
| 11/16/2016*; 8:00 pm | | SUNY Oneonta | W 97–56 | 2–1 | 16 – Rowley | 8 – Charles | 5 – Anderson | SEFCU Arena (3,163); Albany, NY |
| 11/19/2016*; 8:00 pm, ESPN3 | | vs. Grand Canyon; Hall of Fame Tip Off Springfield | L 77–82 | 2–2 | 24 – Cremo | 10 – Rowley | 3 – Nichols | Mohegan Sun Arena; Uncasville, CT |
| 11/20/2016*; 8:00 pm, ESPN3 | | vs. Brown; Hall of Fame Tip Off Springfield | W 80–76 | 3–2 | 21 – Grayson | 12 – Stire | 6 – Cremo | Mohegan Sun Arena (9,119); Uncasville, CT |
| 11/27/2016*; 7:00 pm | | Siena; Albany Cup | W 81–72 | 4–2 | 29 – Nichols | 6 – Rowley | 5 – Cremo | SEFCU Arena (4,538); Albany, NY |
| 11/30/2016*; 7:00 pm | | Holy Cross | L 49–55 | 4–3 | 10 – Tied | 10 – Rowley | 4 – Cremo | SEFCU Arena (2,518); Albany, NY |
| 12/03/2016*; 2:00 pm | | at Yale | L 55–59 | 4–4 | 14 – Nichols | 10 – Stire | 5 – Nichols | John J. Lee Amphitheater (1,204); New Haven, CT |
| 12/07/2016*; 7:00 pm | | Marist | W 78–66 | 5–4 | 24 – Cremo | 5 – Ennema | 7 – Cremo | SEFCU Arena (2,651); Albany, NY |
| 12/10/2016*; 2:00 pm | | at Colgate | W 74–66 | 6–4 | 29 – Cremo | 8 – Ennema | 4 – Nichols | Cotterell Court (740); Hamilton, NY |
| 12/12/2016*; 7:00 pm | | at Canisius | L 64–77 | 6–5 | 21 – Nichols | 10 – Rowley | 7 – Cremo | Koessler Athletic Center (944); Buffalo, NY |
| 12/17/2016*; 7:00 pm | | St. Francis Brooklyn | W 87–60 | 7–5 | 20 – Cremo | 10 – Ennema | 10 – Rowley | SEFCU Arena (2,662); Albany, NY |
| 12/20/2016*; 8:00 pm | | at SMU | L 53–71 | 7–6 | 15 – Cremo | 6 – Rowley | 5 – Nichols | Moody Coliseum (6,505); Dallas, TX |
| 12/30/2016*; 7:00 pm | | at Columbia | W 70–67 | 8–6 | 22 – Cremo | 8 – Stire | 2 – 3 tied | Levien Gymnasium (1,327); New York City, NY |
| 01/02/2017*; 7:00 pm, ESPN3 | | Cornell | W 69–59 | 9–6 | 16 – Nichols | 9 – Cremo | 5 – Nichols | SEFCU Arena (2,430); Albany, NY |
American East regular season
| 01/05/2017; 7:00 pm, ESPN3 | | at UMass Lowell | L 79–85 | 9–7 (0–1) | 23 – Cremo | 6 – Rowley | 6 – Cremo | Costello Athletic Center (352); Lowell, MA |
| 01/08/2017; 2:00 pm, ESPN3 | | at Stony Brook | L 70–72 | 9–8 (0–2) | 17 – Cremo | 7 – Cremo | 5 – Cremo | Island Federal Credit Union Arena (2,962); Stony Brook, NY |
| 01/11/2017; 7:00 pm, ESPN3 | | New Hampshire | L 67–75 | 9–9 (0–3) | 19 – Nichols | 7 – Stire | 2 – 3 tied | SEFCU Arena (2,318); Albany, NY |
| 01/16/2017; 1:00 pm, ESPN3 | | at UMBC | W 77–50 | 10–9 (1–3) | 18 – Nichols | 7 – Tied | 3 – Cremo | Retriever Activities Center (1,591); Catonsville, MD |
| 01/19/2017; 7:00 pm, ESPN3 | | Binghamton | W 84–65 | 11–9 (2–3) | 25 – Nichols | 7 – Stire | 6 – Cremo | SEFCU Arena (2,308); Albany, NY |
| 01/22/2017; 2:00 pm, ESPN3 | | Maine | W 81–63 | 12–9 (3–3) | 28 – Nichols | 8 – Campbell | 5 – Cremo | SEFCU Arena (2,513); Albany, NY |
| 01/25/2017; 7:00 pm, ESPN3 | | Vermont | L 49–60 | 12–10 (3–4) | 13 – Cremo | 11 – Cremo | 3 – Nichols | SEFCU Arena (2,822); Albany, NY |
| 01/28/2017; 7:00 pm, ESPN3 | | at Hartford | W 74–61 | 13–10 (4–4) | 20 – Cremo | 15 – Stire | 3 – Tied | Chase Arena at Reich Family Pavilion (1,423); Hartford, CT |
| 02/01/2017; 7:00 pm, ESPN3 | | UMass Lowell | W 90–77 | 14–10 (5–4) | 24 – Nichols | 9 – Stire | 8 – Nichols | SEFCU Arena (2,512); Albany, NY |
| 02/04/2017; 7:00 pm, ESPN3 | | Stony Brook | L 65–72 | 14–11 (5–5) | 15 – Stire | 6 – Tied | 4 – Cremo | SEFCU Arena (4,538); Albany, NY |
| 02/06/2017; 7:00 pm, ESPN3 | | at New Hampshire | W 69–55 | 15–11 (6–5) | 21 – Cremo | 7 – Nichols | 5 – Nichols | Lundholm Gym (685); Durham, NH |
| 02/09/2017; 7:00 pm, ESPN3 | | at Binghamton | W 66–54 | 16–11 (7–5) | 17 – Nichols | 10 – Campbell | 4 – Nichols | Binghamton University Events Center (2,241); Vestal, NY |
| 02/15/2017; 7:00 pm, ESPN3 | | UMBC | W 78–69 | 17–11 (8–5) | 25 – Campbell | 10 – Campbell | 3 – Tied | SEFCU Arena (2,443); Albany, NY |
| 02/19/2017; 2:00 pm, ESPN3 | | at Maine | W 74–56 | 18–11 (9–5) | 20 – Nichols | 13 – Campbell | 4 – Tied | Cross Insurance Center (727); Bangor, ME |
| 02/22/2017; 7:00 pm, ESPN3 | | at Vermont | L 50–62 | 18–12 (9–6) | 18 – Nichols | 5 – Rowley | 3 – 3 tied | Patrick Gym (3,266); Burlington, VT |
| 02/25/2017; 7:00 pm, ESPN3 | | Hartford | W 80–62 | 19–12 (10–6) | 25 – Cremo | 7 – Campbell | 5 – Cremo | SEFCU Arena (2,715); Albany, NY |
America East tournament
| 03/01/2017; 7:30 pm, ESPN3 | (3) | (6) Hartford; Quarterfinals | W 100–71 | 20–12 | 40 – Nichols | 9 – Stire | 10 – Cremo | SEFCU Arena (1,693); Albany, NY |
| 03/06/2017; 7:30 pm, ESPN3 | (3) | at (2) Stony Brook; Semifinals | W 63–56 | 21–12 | 19 – Nichols | 7 – Tied | 2 – Tied | Island Federal Credit Union Arena (4,009); Stony Brook, NY |
| 03/11/2017; 11:00 am, ESPN2 | (3) | at (1) Vermont; Championship game | L 53–56 | 21–13 | 16 – Charles | 7 – Rowley | 4 – Cremo | Patrick Gym (3,266); Burlington, VT |
CIT
| 03/16/2017*; 7:00 pm, Facebook Live | | Saint Peter's; First Round | L 55–59 | 21–14 | 15 – Nichols | 5 – Ennema | 4 – Nichols | SEFCU Arena (641); Albany, NY |
*Non-conference game. ^{#}Rankings from AP poll. (#) Tournament seedings in parentheses. All times are in Eastern Time.
