= 2016–17 UMBC Retrievers men's basketball team =

American college basketball season

2016–17 UMBC Retrievers men's basketball
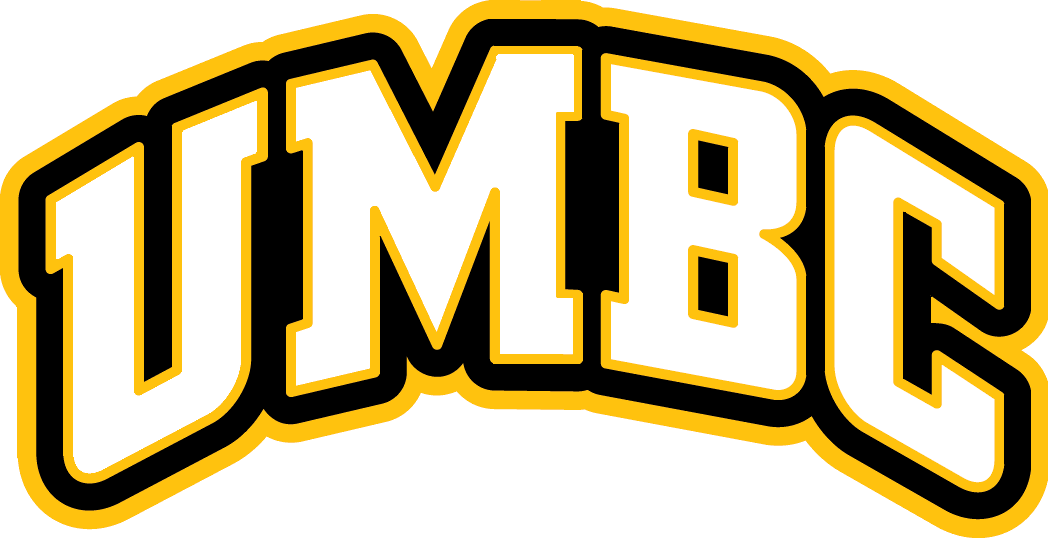

CIT, Semifinals
- Conference: America East Conference
- Record: 21–13 (9–7 America East)
- Head coach: Ryan Odom (1st season)
- Assistant coaches: Nate Dixon; Eric Skeeters; Bryce Crawford
- Home arena: Retriever Activities Center

2016–17 America East Conference men's basketball standings
	Conf.				Overall
Team	W		L	PCT	W		L	PCT
Vermont †	16	–	0	1.000	29	–	6	.829
Stony Brook	12	–	4	.750	18	–	14	.563
Albany	10	–	6	.625	21	–	14	.600
New Hampshire	10	–	6	.625	20	–	12	.625
UMBC	9	–	7	.563	21	–	13	.618
UMass Lowell*	5	–	11	.313	11	–	20	.355
Hartford	4	–	12	.250	9	–	23	.281
Binghamton	3	–	13	.188	12	–	20	.375
Maine	3	–	13	.188	7	–	25	.219
† 2017 America East tournament winner * Ineligible for postseason during transition to Division I.

The 2016–17 UMBC Retrievers men's basketball team represented the University of Maryland, Baltimore County during the 2016–17 NCAA Division I men's basketball season. The Retrievers, led by first-year head coach Ryan Odom, played their home games at the Retriever Activities Center in Catonsville, Maryland as members of the America East Conference. They finished the season 21–13, 9–7 in America East play to finish in fifth place. They lost in the quarterfinals of the America East tournament to New Hampshire. They were invited to the CollegeInsider.com Tournament where they defeated Fairfield, Saint Francis (PA), and Liberty before losing in the semifinals to Texas A&M–Corpus Christi.

== Previous season ==
The Retrievers finished the 2015–16 season 7–25, 3–13 in America East play to finish in last place. They lost in the first round of the America East tournament to Stony Brook.

On March 3, 2016, head coach Aki Thomas was fired. He finished at UMBC with a four-year record of 28–95. On March 30, the school hired Ryan Odom as head coach.

== Preseason ==
UMBC was picked to finish sixth in the preseason America East poll. Jahad Thomas, Jr. was selected to the preseason All-America East team.

== Departures ==
Name	Number	Pos.	Height	Weight	Year	Hometown	Notes
Jakob Stenhede	41	F	6'10"	205	Sophomore	Gothenburg, Sweden	Left the team for personal reasons
Cody Joyce	42	F	6'8"	235	Senior	Churchton, MD	Graduated

== 2016 incoming recruits ==
College recruiting
Name	Hometown	School	Height	Weight	Commit date
Arkel Ager-Lamar; SG	Bridgeport, CT	St. Thomas More School	6 ft 5 in (1.96 m)	210 lb (95 kg)	Aug 17, 2016
Arkel Ager-Lamar; SG	Recruit ratings: Scout: Rivals: (NR)				
David Park; SF	Wheeling, WV	United States Air Force Academy Prep School	6 ft 5 in (1.96 m)	215 lb (98 kg)	Aug 5, 2016
David Park; SF	Recruit ratings: Scout: Rivals: (NR)				
Max Curran; PF	Hooksett, NH	Notre Dame Prep	6 ft 9 in (2.06 m)	190 lb (86 kg)	Jul 16, 2016
Max Curran; PF	Recruit ratings: Scout: Rivals: (NR)				
Overall recruit ranking:
Note: In many cases, Scout, Rivals, 247Sports, On3, and ESPN may conflict in their listings of height and weight.; In these cases, the average was taken. ESPN grades are on a 100-point scale.; Sources: "2016 Team Ranking". Rivals.

== Roster ==
2016–17 UMBC Retrievers men's basketball team
Players
Coaches

Pos.	#	Name	Height	Weight	Year	Previous school	Hometown
G	0	Daquon Ervin	6 ft 0 in (1.83 m)	185 lb (84 kg)	So	Northfield Mount Hermon	Brooklyn, NY
G	1	Rodney Elliott	6 ft 0 in (1.83 m)	190 lb (86 kg)	RS Jr	John Carroll	Baltimore, MD
G	2	Malcolm L. Brent	6 ft 5 in (1.96 m)	200 lb (91 kg)	Jr	Kimball Union Academy	Silver Spring, MD
G	3	Ben Grace (W)	5 ft 10 in (1.78 m)	180 lb (82 kg)	Sr	The Gilman School	Baltimore, MD
G	4	Joel Wincowski	6 ft 2 in (1.88 m)	200 lb (91 kg)	So	Lake George	Lake George, NY
G	5	Jourdan Grant	6 ft 2 in (1.88 m)	185 lb (84 kg)	Jr	Archbishop Spalding	Bowie, MD
G	10	Jairus Lyles	6 ft 2 in (1.88 m)	175 lb (79 kg)	RS Jr	DeMatha	Silver Spring, MD
G	11	K. J. Maura	5 ft 8 in (1.73 m)	135 lb (61 kg)	RS Jr	Arlington Country Day; College of Central Florida	San Juan, PR
G	12	Will Darley	6 ft 8 in (2.03 m)	210 lb (95 kg)	Sr	Dulaney/Fishburne Academy	Timonium, MD
G	13	Joe Sherburne	6 ft 6 in (1.98 m)	215 lb (98 kg)	So	Whitefish Bay	Whitefish Bay, WI
F	15	Logan Fullham	6 ft 5 in (1.96 m)	248 lb (112 kg)	Sr	Lampeter Strasburg	Strasburg, PA
F/C	21	Sam Schwietz	6 ft 9 in (2.06 m)	235 lb (107 kg)	So	Johnson Ferry Christian Acad.	Frisco, TX
F	24	Max Curran	6 ft 9 in (2.06 m)	190 lb (86 kg)	Fr	Pembroke Acad.	Hooksett, NH
G	24	Ishmail Jabbie (W)	6 ft 3 in (1.91 m)	175 lb (79 kg)	So	Eleanor Roosevelt	Bowie, MD
G	25	David Park	6 ft 5 in (1.96 m)	215 lb (98 kg)	Fr	Wheeling Central Catholic	Wheeling, WV
G/F	33	Arkel Lamar	6 ft 5 in (1.96 m)	210 lb (95 kg)	Fr	St. Thomas More	Bridgeport, CT
F/C	35	Nolan Gerrity	6 ft 10 in (2.08 m)	225 lb (102 kg)	So	Barea-Midpark	Cleveland, OH

Head coach

- Ryan Odom (Hampden–Sydney)

Assistant coach(es)

- Nate Dixon (UNC Wilmington)
- Eric Skeeters (Coppin State)
- Bryce Crawford (Ohio State)

Legend

- (C) Team captain
- (S) Suspended
- (I) Ineligible
- (W) Walk-on
- Injured
- Current redshirt

Roster

== Schedule and results ==
Date time, TV	Rank^{#}	Opponent^{#}	Result	Record	Site (attendance) city, state
Non-conference regular season
11/11/2016*; 2:00 pm		Hood	W 92–61	1–0	Retriever Activities Center (617); Catonsville, MD
11/13/2016*; 4:00 pm		at Maryland Eastern Shore	W 77–73	2–0	Hytche Athletic Center (1,364); Princess Anne, MD
11/16/2016*; 7:00 pm		Delaware State	W 90–68	3–0	Retriever Activities Center (612); Catonsville, MD
11/19/2016*; 3:00 pm		Kennesaw State	W 93–85	4–0	Retriever Activities Center (719); Catonsville, MD
11/23/2016*; 7:00 pm		at Navy	L 66–78	4–1	Alumni Hall (867); Annapolis, MD
11/30/2016*; 7:00 pm		at Duquesne	W 81–72	5–1	Palumbo Center (903); Pittsburgh, PA
12/03/2016*; 1:00 pm		Messiah	W 98–59	6–1	Retriever Activities Center (519); Catonsville, MD
12/07/2016*; 7:00 pm		at Mount St. Mary's	W 78–70	7–1	Knott Arena (1,450); Emmitsburg, MD
12/10/2016*; 6:00 pm		at Richmond	L 75–78	7–2	Robins Center (5,552); Richmond, VA
12/17/2016*; 7:00 pm, ESPN3		Towson	L 72–73	7–3	Retriever Activities Center (1,311); Catonsville, MD
12/19/2016*; 7:00 pm, ESPN3		The Citadel	W 120–111 ^{2OT}	8–3	Retriever Activities Center (767); Catonsville, MD
12/23/2016*; 7:00 pm		at James Madison	W 62–61	9–3	JMU Convocation Center (2,358); Harrisonburg, VA
12/28/2016*; 7:00 pm, ACCN Extra		at Virginia Tech	L 70–87	9–4	Cassell Coliseum (5,458); Blacksburg, VA
America East regular season
01/05/2017; 7:00 pm, ESPN3		Binghamton	W 85–71	10–4 (1–0)	Retriever Activities Center (621); Catonsville, MD
01/08/2017; 12:00 pm, ESPN3		Maine	W 75–64	11–4 (2–0)	Retriever Activities Center (604); Catonsville, MD
01/11/2017; 7:00 pm		at Hartford	W 84–68	12–4 (3–0)	Chase Arena at Reich Family Pavilion (717); Hartford, CT
01/13/2017; 7:00 pm		at Vermont	L 72–81	12–5 (3–1)	Patrick Gym (2,341); Burlington, VT
01/16/2017; 1:00 pm, ESPN3		Albany	L 50–77	12–6 (3–2)	Retriever Activities Center (1,591); Catonsville, MD
01/22/2017; 1:00 pm		at UMass Lowell	W 102–86	13–6 (4–2)	Costello Athletic Center (549); Lowell, MA
01/25/2017; 7:00 pm, ESPN3		at Stony Brook	L 73–83	13–7 (4–3)	Island Federal Credit Union Arena (3,013); Stony Brook, NY
01/28/2017; 1:00 pm		New Hampshire	W 105–103 ^{2OT}	14–7 (5–3)	Retriever Activities Center (898); Catonsville, MD
02/01/2017; 7:00 pm, ESPN3		at Binghamton	W 92–74	15–7 (6–3)	Binghamton University Events Center (4,939); Vestal, NY
02/04/2017; 1:00 pm		at Maine	W 83–71	16–7 (7–3)	Cross Insurance Center (864); Bangor, ME
02/09/2017; 7:00 pm, ESPN3		Hartford	L 77–84	16–8 (7–4)	Retriever Activities Center (1,002); Catonsville, MD
02/12/2017; 1:00 pm, ESPN3		Vermont	L 74–77	16–9 (7–5)	Retriever Activities Center (1,219); Catonsville, MD
02/15/2017; 7:00 pm, ESPN3		at Albany	L 69–78	16–10 (7–6)	SEFCU Arena (2,443); Albany, NY
02/18/2017; 1:00 pm, ESPN3		UMass Lowell	W 108–102	17–10 (8–6)	Retriever Activities Center (874); Catonsville, MD
02/22/2017; 7:00 pm, ESPN3		Stony Brook	W 65–52	18–10 (9–6)	Retriever Activities Center (991); Catonsville, MD
02/25/2017; 1:00 pm, ESPN3		at New Hampshire	L 90–94 ^{2OT}	18–11 (9–7)	Lundholm Gym (1,328); Durham, NH
America East tournament
03/01/2017; 7:30 pm, ESPN3	(5)	at (4) New Hampshire; Quarterfinals	L 65–74	18–12	Lundholm Gym (1,473); Durham, NH
CIT
03/15/2017*; 7:00 pm, Facebook Live		Fairfield; First Round	W 88–83	19–12	Retriever Activities Center (688); Catonsville, MD
03/18/2017*; 2:00 pm, Facebook Live		Saint Francis (PA); Second Round	W 87–79	20–12	Retriever Activities Center (904); Catonsville, MD
03/26/2017*; 2:00 pm, Facebook Live		Liberty; Quarterfinals	W 80–68	21–12	Retriever Activities Center (869); Catonsville, MD
03/29/2017*; 7:00 pm, CBSSN		Texas A&M–Corpus Christi; Semifinals	L 61–79	21–13	Retriever Activities Center (1,388); Catonsville, MD
*Non-conference game. ^{#}Rankings from AP Poll. (#) Tournament seedings in parentheses. All times are in Eastern Time.
