= 2016–17 Vermont Catamounts men's basketball team =

American college basketball season

2016–17 Vermont Catamounts men's basketball

America East regular season and tournament champions

NCAA tournament, First Round
- Conference: America East Conference
- Record: 29–6 (16–0 America East)
- Head coach: John Becker (6th season)
- Assistant coaches: Kyle Cieplicki; Ryan Schneider; Hamlet Tibbs
- Home arena: Patrick Gym

2016–17 America East Conference men's basketball standings
| | Conf. | | | | Overall |
| Team | W | | L | PCT | W | | L | PCT |
|---|---|---|---|---|---|---|---|---|
| Vermont † | 16 | – | 0 | 1.000 | 29 | – | 6 | .829 |
| Stony Brook | 12 | – | 4 | .750 | 18 | – | 14 | .563 |
| Albany | 10 | – | 6 | .625 | 21 | – | 14 | .600 |
| New Hampshire | 10 | – | 6 | .625 | 20 | – | 12 | .625 |
| UMBC | 9 | – | 7 | .563 | 21 | – | 13 | .618 |
| UMass Lowell* | 5 | – | 11 | .313 | 11 | – | 20 | .355 |
| Hartford | 4 | – | 12 | .250 | 9 | – | 23 | .281 |
| Binghamton | 3 | – | 13 | .188 | 12 | – | 20 | .375 |
| Maine | 3 | – | 13 | .188 | 7 | – | 25 | .219 |
† 2017 America East tournament winner * Ineligible for postseason during transition to Division I.

The 2016–17 Vermont Catamounts men's basketball team represented the University of Vermont during the 2016–17 NCAA Division I men's basketball season. The Catamounts, led by sixth-year head coach John Becker, played their home games at Patrick Gym in Burlington, Vermont and were members of the America East Conference. They finished the season 29–6, 16–0 in America East play to win the America East regular season championship. In the America East tournament, they defeated Maine, New Hampshire and Albany to win the tournament championship. As a result, they received the conference's automatic bid to the NCAA tournament. As a No. 13 seed in the Midwest region, they lost to No. 4-seeded Purdue in the first round.

== Previous season ==
The Catamounts finished the 2015–16 season 23–14, 11–5 in America East play to finish in a tie for third place. They defeated Maine and New Hampshire to advance to the championship game of the America East tournament where they lost to Stony Brook. They received an invitation to the College Basketball Invitational. There, they defeated Western Carolina and Seattle to advance to the semifinals before losing to Nevada.

== Preseason ==
Vermont was picked to finish first in the preseason America East poll. Trae Bell-Haynes was selected to the preseason All-America East team.

== Departures ==
| Name | Number | Pos. | Height | Weight | Year | Hometown | Notes |
|---|---|---|---|---|---|---|---|
| Dylan Sinnickson | 5 | F | 6'5" | 195 | Senior | Sands Point, NY | Walk-on; graduated |
| Ethan O'Day | 32 | F | 6'9" | 201 | Senior | Mansfield, CT | Graduated |

=== Incoming transfers ===
| Name | Number | Pos. | Height | Weight | Year | Hometown | Previous School |
|---|---|---|---|---|---|---|---|
| Samuel Dingba | 5 | F | 6'5" | 205 | Junior | Yaoundé, Cameroon | Transferred from Quinnipiac. Under NCAA transfer rules, Dinga will not play for the 2016–17 season. Will have two years of remaining eligibility. |

== 2016 incoming recruits ==
College recruiting information
| Name | Hometown | School | Height | Weight | Commit date |
|---|---|---|---|---|---|
| Anthony Lamb #86 PF | Rochester, NY | Greece Athena High School | 6 ft 6 in (1.98 m) | 225 lb (102 kg) | Sep 7, 2015 |
| Anthony Lamb #86 PF | Recruit ratings: Scout: Rivals: (65) | | | | |
| Ben Shungu; PG | Burlington, VT | Rice Memorial High School | 6 ft 2 in (1.88 m) | 200 lb (91 kg) | Jan 19, 2016 |
| Ben Shungu; PG | Recruit ratings: Scout: Rivals: (0) | | | | |
| Kian Dalyrimple; SG | Dix Hills, NY | Half Hallow Hills West High School | 6 ft 4 in (1.93 m) | 177 lb (80 kg) | May 12, 2016 |
| Kian Dalyrimple; SG | Recruit ratings: Scout: Rivals: (0) | | | | |
Overall recruit ranking:
Note: In many cases, Scout, Rivals, 247Sports, On3, and ESPN may conflict in their listings of height and weight.; In these cases, the average was taken. ESPN grades are on a 100-point scale.; Sources: "2016 Team Ranking". Rivals.

== Roster ==
2016–17 Vermont Catamounts men's basketball team
Players
Coaches

| Pos. | # | Name | Height | Weight | Year | Previous school | Hometown |
|---|---|---|---|---|---|---|---|
| G | 0 | Ben Shungu (W) (redshirt) | 6 ft 2 in (1.88 m) | 200 lb (91 kg) | Fr | Rice Memorial | Burlington, VT |
| G/F | 1 | Josh Hearlihy | 6 ft 8 in (2.03 m) | 213 lb (97 kg) | RS Jr | Northfield Mount Hermon; Tulane | Los Angeles, CA |
| G | 2 | Trae Bell-Haynes | 6 ft 2 in (1.88 m) | 175 lb (79 kg) | Jr | Bill Crothers Secondary | Toronto, ON |
| F | 3 | Anthony Lamb | 6 ft 6 in (1.98 m) | 227 lb (103 kg) | Fr | Greece Athena | Rochester, NY |
| G | 4 | David Urso (W) | 6 ft 2 in (1.88 m) | 200 lb (91 kg) | Jr | Central Catholic | Pittsburgh, PA |
| F | 5 | Sam Dingba (redshirt) | 6 ft 5 in (1.96 m) | 205 lb (93 kg) | Jr | Salisbury School; Qunnipiac | Yaoundé, Cameroon |
| F | 12 | Darren Payen | 6 ft 8 in (2.03 m) | 217 lb (98 kg) | RS Sr | Hamden Hall; Hofstra | Milford, CT |
| G | 14 | Cam Ward | 6 ft 2 in (1.88 m) | 170 lb (77 kg) | Jr | Marshall | Marshall, WI |
| G | 15 | Kian Dalyrimple (redshirt) | 6 ft 4 in (1.93 m) | 177 lb (80 kg) | Fr | Half Hollow Hills West | Dix Hills, NY |
| G | 20 | Ernie Duncan | 6 ft 3 in (1.91 m) | 190 lb (86 kg) | So | Harrison | Evansville, IN |
| G | 21 | Everett Duncan (redshirt) | 6 ft 6 in (1.98 m) | 190 lb (86 kg) | So | Harrison | Evansville, IN |
| G | 24 | Dre Wills | 6 ft 1 in (1.85 m) | 185 lb (84 kg) | Sr | Mercersburg Academy | Indianapolis, IN |
| F | 25 | Drew Urquhart | 6 ft 8 in (2.03 m) | 219 lb (99 kg) | Jr | Eastside Catholic | Vancouver, BC |
| F | 32 | Josh Speidel (redshirt) | 6 ft 7 in (2.01 m) | 210 lb (95 kg) | Fr | Columbus North | Columbus, IN |
| G/F | 34 | Kurt Steidl | 6 ft 6 in (1.98 m) | 181 lb (82 kg) | Sr | Ridgefield | Ridgefield, CT |
| F | 35 | Payton Henson | 6 ft 8 in (2.03 m) | 215 lb (98 kg) | RS Jr | Siloam Springs; Tulane | Siloam Springs, AR |
| F | 44 | Nate Rohrer (W) | 6 ft 7 in (2.01 m) | 215 lb (98 kg) | RS Jr | Leland | Underhill, VT |

Head coach

- John Becker (Catholic)

Assistant coach(es)

- Kyle Cieplicki (Vermont)
- Ryan Schneider (Marist)
- Hamlet Tibbs (West Virginia)

Legend

- (C) Team captain
- (S) Suspended
- (I) Ineligible
- (W) Walk-on
- Injured
- Current redshirt

Roster

== Schedule and results ==
| Date time, TV | Rank^{#} | Opponent^{#} | Result | Record | Site (attendance) city, state |
Exhibition
| 10/29/2016*; 7:00 pm | | Quebec–Montreal | W 89–66 | | Patrick Gym (2,028); Burlington, VT |
| 11/07/2016*; 7:00 pm | | Saint Michael's | W 94–65 | | Patrick Gym (2,404); Burlington, VT |
Non-conference regular season
| 11/12/2016*; 1:00 pm | | at Quinnipiac | W 94–70 | 1–0 | TD Bank Sports Center (1,517); Hamden, CT |
| 11/14/2016*; 7:00 pm, FS2 | | at Providence | L 58–80 | 1–1 | Dunkin' Donuts Center (8,310); Providence, RI |
| 11/16/2016*; 7:00 pm | | at Marist | W 76–72 | 2–1 | McCann Field House (1,112); Poughkeepsie, NY |
| 11/19/2016*; 1:00 pm | | Lyndon State; Gulf Coast Showcase Opening Round | W 79–20 | 3–1 | Patrick Gym (1,955); Burlington, VT |
| 11/21/2016*; 11:00 am | | vs. Wofford; Gulf Coast Showcase quarterfinals | W 60–59 | 4–1 | Germain Arena; Estero, FL |
| 11/22/2016*; 5:00 pm | | vs. Hofstra; Gulf Coast Showcase semifinals | W 87–73 | 5–1 | Germain Arena; Estero, FL |
| 11/23/2016*; 7:30 pm | | vs. Houston; Gulf Coast Showcase finals | L 71–72 | 5–2 | Germain Arena; Estero, FL |
| 11/26/2016*; 1:00 pm | | Yale | W 67–65 | 6–2 | Patrick Gym (2,173); Burlington, VT |
| 12/01/2016*; 6:30 pm | | at No. 20 South Carolina | L 50–68 | 6–3 | Colonial Life Arena (11,579); Columbia, SC |
| 12/07/2016*; 7:00 pm | | Dartmouth | W 73–58 | 7–3 | Patrick Gym (2,186); Burlington, VT |
| 12/10/2016*; 1:00 pm | | Northeastern | L 57–59 | 7–4 | Patrick Gym (2,284); Burlington, VT |
| 12/17/2016*; 1:00 pm | | Eastern Michigan | W 82–74 | 8–4 | Patrick Gym (1,775); Burlington, VT |
| 12/21/2016*; 7:00 pm, FSN | | at No. 13 Butler | L 69–81 | 8–5 | Hinkle Fieldhouse (7,898); Indianapolis, IN |
| 12/29/2016*; 7:00 pm, ESPN3 | | at Siena | W 76–60 | 9–5 | Times Union Center (6,176); Albany, NY |
| 01/02/2017*; 7:00 pm | | Harvard | W 82–71 | 10–5 | Patrick Gym (2,312); Burlington, VT |
America East regular season
| 01/05/2017; 7:00 pm, ESPN3 | | at Maine | W 90–77 | 11–5 (1–0) | Cross Insurance Center (798); Bangor, ME |
| 01/08/2017; 4:00 pm | | Hartford | W 85–54 | 12–5 (2–0) | Patrick Gym (2,192); Burlington, VT |
| 01/11/2017; 7:00 pm | | at Binghamton | W 67–50 | 13–5 (3–0) | Binghamton University Events Center (1,878); Vestal, NY |
| 01/13/2017; 7:00 pm | | UMBC | W 81–72 | 14–5 (4–0) | Patrick Gym (2,341); Burlington, VT |
| 01/16/2017; 1:00 pm, ESPN3 | | at New Hampshire | W 71–59 | 15–5 (5–0) | Lundholm Gym (881); Durham, NH |
| 01/19/2017; 7:00 pm | | UMass Lowell | W 81–67 | 16–5 (6–0) | Patrick Gym (2,326); Burlington, VT |
| 01/25/2017; 7:00 pm, ESPN3 | | at Albany | W 60–49 | 17–5 (7–0) | SEFCU Arena (2,822); Albany, NY |
| 01/28/2017; 7:00 pm, ESPN3 | | at Stony Brook | W 71–64 | 18–5 (8–0) | Island Federal Credit Union Arena (4,009); Stony Brook, NY |
| 02/01/2017; 7:00 pm | | Maine | W 74–53 | 19–5 (9–0) | Patrick Gym (2,384); Burlington, VT |
| 02/04/2017; 7:00 pm | | at Hartford | W 79–66 | 20–5 (10–0) | Chase Arena at Reich Family Pavilion (1,898); Hartford, CT |
| 02/06/2017; 7:00 pm | | Binghamton | W 71–51 | 21–5 (11–0) | Patrick Gym (2,615); Burlington, VT |
| 02/09/2017; 9:00 pm, ESPNU | | New Hampshire | W 82–74 | 22–5 (12–0) | Patrick Gym (1,775); Burlington, VT |
| 02/12/2017; 1:00 pm, ESPN3 | | at UMBC | W 77–74 | 23–5 (13–0) | Retriever Activities Center (1,219); Catonsville, MD |
| 02/15/2017; 7:00 pm, ESPN3 | | at UMass Lowell | W 87–66 | 24–5 (14–0) | Tsongas Center (2,540); Lowell, MA |
| 02/22/2017; 7:00 pm, ESPN3 | | Albany | W 62–50 | 25–5 (15–0) | Patrick Gym (3,266); Burlington, VT |
| 02/25/2017; 2:00 pm, ESPN3 | | Stony Brook | W 66–51 | 26–5 (16–0) | Patrick Gym (3,266); Burlington, VT |
America East tournament
| 03/01/2017; 7:00 pm, ESPN3 | (1) | (8) Maine; Quarterfinals | W 86–41 | 27–5 | Patrick Gym (3,266); Burlington, VT |
| 03/06/2017; 7:00 pm, ESPN3 | (1) | (4) New Hampshire; Semifinals | W 74–41 | 28–5 | Patrick Gym (3,266); Burlington, VT |
| 03/11/2017; 12:00 pm, ESPN2 | (1) | (3) Albany; Championship | W 56–53 | 29–5 | Patrick Gym (3,266); Burlington, VT |
NCAA tournament
| 03/16/2017*; 7:27 pm, truTV | (13 MW) | vs. (4 MW) No. 15 Purdue; First Round | L 70–80 | 29–6 | BMO Harris Bradley Center (18,025); Milwaukee, WI |
*Non-conference game. ^{#}Rankings from AP Poll. (#) Tournament seedings in parentheses. MW=Midwest Region. All times are in Eastern Time.
