= 2016–17 UMass Lowell River Hawks men's basketball team =

American college basketball season

2016–17 UMass Lowell River Hawks men's basketball
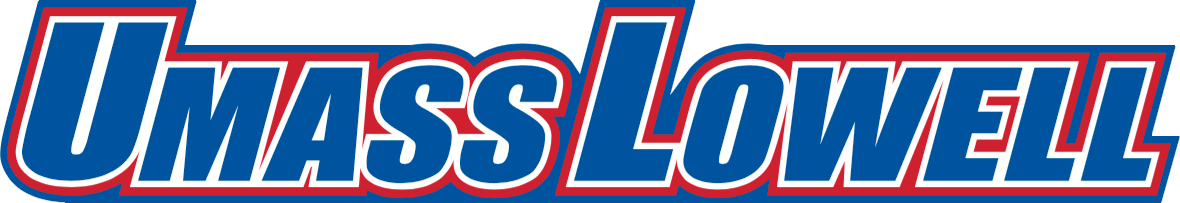
- Conference: America East Conference
- Record: 11–20 (5–11 America East)
- Head coach: Pat Duquette (4th season)
- Assistant coaches: Biko Paris; Nick Leonardelli; Louis Hinnant
- Home arena: Costello Athletic Center; Tsongas Center

2016–17 America East Conference men's basketball standings
	Conf.				Overall
Team	W		L	PCT	W		L	PCT
Vermont †	16	–	0	1.000	29	–	6	.829
Stony Brook	12	–	4	.750	18	–	14	.563
Albany	10	–	6	.625	21	–	14	.600
New Hampshire	10	–	6	.625	20	–	12	.625
UMBC	9	–	7	.563	21	–	13	.618
UMass Lowell*	5	–	11	.313	11	–	20	.355
Hartford	4	–	12	.250	9	–	23	.281
Binghamton	3	–	13	.188	12	–	20	.375
Maine	3	–	13	.188	7	–	25	.219
† 2017 America East tournament winner * Ineligible for postseason during transition to Division I.

The 2016–17 UMass Lowell River Hawks men's basketball team represented the University of Massachusetts Lowell during the 2016–17 NCAA Division I men's basketball season. The River Hawks, led by fourth-year head coach Pat Duquette, played most of their home games at Costello Athletic Center, with five home games at the Tsongas Center. They were members of the America East Conference.

They finished the season 11–20, 5–11 in American East play to finish in sixth place.

UMass Lowell was in the fourth and final year of a transition to Division I and thus ineligible for the postseason, including the America East tournament.

== Previous season ==
The River Hawks finished the 2015–16 season 11–18, 7–9 in America East play to finish in fifth place.

== Preseason ==
UMass Lowell was picked to finish fifth in the preseason America East poll.

== Departures ==
Name	Number	Pos.	Height	Weight	Year	Hometown	Notes
Keith Hayes II	1	G	5'11"	170	Freshman	Bryant, AR	Transferred to Panola College
D. J. Mlachnik	21	G	6'2"	180	Senior	Muskego, WI	Graduated
Mark Cornelius	30	G	6'3"	195	Senior	Westford, MA	Graduated
Donny Belcher III	33	F	6'2"	225	Freshman	Irving, TX	Transferred to Hesston College

== 2016 incoming recruits ==
College recruiting information
Name	Hometown	School	Height	Weight	Commit date
Rinardo Perry #104 SG	Washington, D.C.	McKinley Tech High School	6 ft 4 in (1.93 m)	158 lb (72 kg)	Oct 17, 2015
Rinardo Perry #104 SG	Recruit ratings: Scout: Rivals: (NR)				
Cameron Wolter; PF	Fishers, IN	Fishers High School	6 ft 7 in (2.01 m)	N/A	Sep 23, 2015
Cameron Wolter; PF	Recruit ratings: Scout: Rivals: (NR)				
Stefan Borovac; SF	Hamilton, ON	Hargrave Military Academy	6 ft 8 in (2.03 m)	N/A	
Stefan Borovac; SF	Recruit ratings: Scout: Rivals: (NR)				
Overall recruit ranking:
Note: In many cases, Scout, Rivals, 247Sports, On3, and ESPN may conflict in their listings of height and weight.; In these cases, the average was taken. ESPN grades are on a 100-point scale.; Sources: "2016 Team Ranking". Rivals.

== Roster ==
2016–17 UMass Lowell River Hawks men's basketball team
Players
Coaches

Pos.	#	Name	Height	Weight	Year	Previous school	Hometown
G	0	Ryan Jones	6 ft 3 in (1.91 m)	185 lb (84 kg)	So	Cleveland High School	Rio Rancho, New Mexico
G	1	Rinardo Perry	6 ft 4 in (1.93 m)	180 lb (82 kg)	Fr	McKinley Technology High School	Washington, D.C.
G/F	3	Stefan Borovac	6 ft 8 in (2.03 m)	210 lb (95 kg)	Fr	Orchard Park High School	Stoney Creek, Ontario
F	5	Dontavious Smith	6 ft 8 in (2.03 m)	200 lb (91 kg)	RS So	North Webster High School	Cullen, Louisiana
G/F	10	Jahad Thomas	6 ft 2 in (1.88 m)	210 lb (95 kg)	RS Jr	Williamsport High School	Williamsport, Pennsylvania
G	11	Isaac White	6 ft 0 in (1.83 m)	178 lb (81 kg)	So	Ashland High School	Ashland, Ohio
G/F	12	Josh Gantz	6 ft 7 in (2.01 m)	215 lb (98 kg)	RS So	Bishop Ready High School	Grove City, Ohio
G	21	Jordan Shea	6 ft 4 in (1.93 m)	195 lb (88 kg)	RS So	Lodi High School	Madison, Wisconsin
G	22	Matt Harris	6 ft 1 in (1.85 m)	198 lb (90 kg)	Jr	Cathedral Preparatory School	Erie, Pennsylvania
G/F	23	Logan Primerano	6 ft 4 in (1.93 m)	180 lb (82 kg)	So	Peru High School	Peru, Indiana
F	24	Tyler Livingston	6 ft 6 in (1.98 m)	215 lb (98 kg)	Sr	Alvirne High School	Hudson, New Hampshire
F	35	Connor Bennett	6 ft 10 in (2.08 m)	230 lb (104 kg)	RS Fr	Wilmington High School	Wilmington, Massachusetts
F	44	Cameron Wolter	6 ft 8 in (2.03 m)	235 lb (107 kg)	Fr	Fishers High School	Fishers, Indiana

Head coach

- Pat Duquette (Williams)

Assistant coach(es)

- Biko Paris (Boston College)
- Nick Leonardelli (Dickinson)
- Louis Hinnant (Boston College)

Legend

- (C) Team captain
- (S) Suspended
- (I) Ineligible
- (W) Walk-on
- Injured
- Current redshirt

Roster

== Schedule and results ==
Date time, TV	Opponent	Result	Record	Site (attendance) city, state
Non-conference regular season
11/11/2016*; 4:00 pm	at Massachusetts	L 76–90	0–1	Mullins Center (5,229); Amherst, MA
11/14/2016*; 7:00 pm	Wagner	W 87–76	1–1	Costello Athletic Center (1,053); Lowell, MA
11/16/2016*; 7:00 pm, BTN	at No. 6 Indiana; Indiana Classic	L 78–100	1–2	Assembly Hall (17,222); Bloomington, IN
11/19/2016*; 7:00 pm	at IPFW; Indiana Classic	L 81–94	1–3	Memorial Coliseum (1,667); Fort Wayne, IN
11/21/2016*; 6:00 pm	at Liberty; Indiana Classic	L 77–84	1–4	Vines Center (1,050); Lynchburg, VA
11/22/2016*; 6:00 pm	vs. Mississippi Valley State; Indiana Classic	W 76–71	2–4	Vines Center (124); Lynchburg, VA
11/26/2016*; 2:00 pm	LIU Brooklyn	L 78–82	2–5	Costello Athletic Center (1,472); Lowell, MA
11/29/2016*; 7:00 pm	at Marist	L 69–81	2–6	McCann Field House (1,008); Poughkeepsie, NY
12/03/2016*; 2:00 pm	NJIT	L 74–75	2–7	Tsongas Center (1,267); Lowell, MA
12/06/2016*; 7:00 pm	at Sacred Heart	L 82–91	2–8	William H. Pitt Center; Fairfield, CT
12/18/2016*; 1:00 pm	Central Connecticut	W 86–69	3–8	Costello Athletic Center (319); Lowell, MA
12/21/2016*; 7:00 pm	Boston University	W 77–75	4–8	Tsongas Center (717); Lowell, MA
12/23/2016*; 1:00 pm	at Loyola (MD)	L 60–69	4–9	Reitz Arena (628); Baltimore, MD
12/29/2016*; 6:00 pm	at Cornell	W 98–96 ^{OT}	5–9	Newman Arena (422); Ithaca, NY
America East regular season
01/05/2017; 7:00 pm, ESPN3	Albany	W 85–79	6–9 (1–0)	Costello Athletic Center (352); Lowell, MA
01/08/2017; 2:00 pm, ESPN3	at Binghamton	W 79–75	7–9 (2–0)	Binghamton University Events Center (1,689); Vestal, NY
01/11/2017; 7:00 pm	at Maine	L 71–73	7–10 (2–1)	Cross Insurance Center (797); Bangor, ME
01/14/2017; 2:00 pm	Hartford	W 71–55	8–10 (3–1)	Costello Athletic Center (512); Lowell, MA
01/16/2017; 2:00 pm, ESPN3	Stony Brook	L 75–86	8–11 (3–2)	Costello Athletic Center (619); Lowell, MA
01/19/2017; 7:00 pm	at Vermont	L 67–81	8–12 (3–3)	Patrick Gym (2,326); Burlington, VT
01/22/2017; 12:00 pm	UMBC	L 86–102	8–13 (3–4)	Costello Athletic Center; Lowell, MA
01/25/2017; 7:00 pm, ESPN3	at New Hampshire	L 71–80	8–14 (3–5)	Lundholm Gym (826); Durham, NH
01/28/2017*; 2:00 pm	Fisher	W 97–73	9–14	Costello Athletic Center (423); Lowell, MA
02/01/2017; 7:00 pm, ESPN3	at Albany	L 77–90	9–15 (3–6)	SEFCU Arena (2,512); Albany, NY
02/04/2017; 2:00 pm	Binghamton	W 60–59	10–15 (4–6)	Costello Athletic Center (523); Lowell, MA
02/06/2017; 7:00 pm	at Stony Brook	L 72–83	10–16 (4–7)	Island Federal Credit Union Arena (2,615); Stony Brook, NY
02/09/2017; 7:00 pm, ESPN3	Maine	W 100–68	11–16 (5–7)	Costello Athletic Center (195); Lowell, MA
02/12/2017; 2:00 pm, ESPN3	at Hartford	L 84–87 ^{OT}	11–17 (5–8)	Chase Arena at Reich Family Pavilion (882); Hartford, CT
02/15/2017; 7:00 pm, ESPN3	Vermont	L 66–87	11–18 (5–9)	Tsongas Center (2,540); Lowell, MA
02/18/2017; 1:00 pm, ESPN3	at UMBC	L 102–108	11–19 (5–10)	Retriever Activities Center (874); Catonsville, MD
02/22/2017; 7:00 pm, ESPN3	New Hampshire	L 67–78	11–20 (5–11)	Tsongas Center (3,799); Lowell, MA
*Non-conference game. ^{#}Rankings from AP Poll. (#) Tournament seedings in parentheses. All times are in Eastern Time.
