= 2016–17 Hartford Hawks men's basketball team =

American college basketball season

2016–17 Hartford Hawks men's basketball
- Conference: America East Conference
- Record: 9–23 (4–12 America East)
- Head coach: John Gallagher (7th season)
- Assistant coaches: Tom Devitt; Jaret von Rosenberg; Ivo Simovic
- Home arena: Chase Arena at Reich Family Pavilion

2016–17 America East Conference men's basketball standings
	Conf.				Overall
Team	W		L	PCT	W		L	PCT
Vermont †	16	–	0	1.000	29	–	6	.829
Stony Brook	12	–	4	.750	18	–	14	.563
Albany	10	–	6	.625	21	–	14	.600
New Hampshire	10	–	6	.625	20	–	12	.625
UMBC	9	–	7	.563	21	–	13	.618
UMass Lowell*	5	–	11	.313	11	–	20	.355
Hartford	4	–	12	.250	9	–	23	.281
Binghamton	3	–	13	.188	12	–	20	.375
Maine	3	–	13	.188	7	–	25	.219
† 2017 America East tournament winner * Ineligible for postseason during transition to Division I.

The 2016–17 Hartford Hawks men's basketball team represented the University of Hartford during the 2016–17 NCAA Division I men's basketball season. The Hawks, led by seventh-year head coach John Gallagher, played their home games at the Chase Arena at Reich Family Pavilion as members of the America East Conference. They finished the season 9–22, 4–12 in America East play to finish in seventh place. They lost in the quarterfinals of the America East tournament to Albany.

== Previous season ==
The Hawks finished the 2015–16 season 10–23, 4–12 in America East play to finish in a tie for seventh place. They defeated Albany in the quarterfinals of the American East tournament to advance to the semifinals where they lost to Stony Brook.

== Preseason ==
Hartford was picked to finish eighth in the preseason America East poll.

== Departures ==
Name	Number	Pos.	Height	Weight	Year	Hometown	Notes
Justin Graham	2	G	6'1"	175	Junior	San Antonio, TX	Graduate transferred to Arkansas Tech
Cleveland Thomas	5	G	6'3"	195	RS Junior	Baton Rouge, LA	Graduate transferred to Western Kentucky
Taylor Dyson	11	G	6'4"	185	Senior	Sassafras, Australia	Graduated
Dougal Weir	14	C	6'9"	240	Junior	Sydney, Australia	Left the team for personal reasons

=== Incoming transfers ===
Name	Number	Pos.	Height	Weight	Year	Hometown	Previous School
Andrew Ramirez	11	G	6'2"	185	Junior	Madrid, Spain	Junior college transferred from Colby CC
Hassan Attia	44	F	6'10"	255	Junior	Alexandria, Egypt	Junior college transferred from Western Nebraska CC

== 2016 incoming recruits ==
Hartford did not have any incoming players in the 2016 recruiting class.

== Roster ==
2016–17 Hartford Hawks men's basketball team
Players
Coaches

Pos.	#	Name	Height	Weight	Year	Previous school	Hometown
F	0	TreVaughn Wilkerson	6 ft 7 in (2.01 m)	205 lb (93 kg)	So	Roman Catholic	Philadelphia, PA
G	1	Jason Dunne	6 ft 4 in (1.93 m)	185 lb (84 kg)	So	Matawan Regional	Matawan, NJ
G	3	Jalen Ross	6 ft 0 in (1.83 m)	185 lb (84 kg)	RS Sr	Greensboro Day School; Eastern Michigan	Greenbelt, MD
F	4	George Blagojevic	6 ft 8 in (2.03 m)	205 lb (93 kg)	So	Australian Institute of Sport	Geelong, Australia
F	10	John Carroll	6 ft 8 in (2.03 m)	220 lb (100 kg)	RS So	IMG Academy/The Hill School	Dublin, Ireland
G	11	Andrew Ramirez	6 ft 8 in (2.03 m)	205 lb (93 kg)	So	Diego Velazquez; Western Nebraska CC	Madrid, Spain
G	13	J. R. Lynch	5 ft 10 in (1.78 m)	170 lb (77 kg)	So	Hudson Catholic/St. Andrew's	Hoboken, NJ
G	20	Max Twyman	6 ft 5 in (1.96 m)	200 lb (91 kg)	RS So	Rye	Rye, NY
F	21	Jack Hobbs	6 ft 7 in (2.01 m)	195 lb (88 kg)	Jr	South Anchorage/Impact Basketball	Anchorage, AK
F	30	Nikola Colovic	6 ft 10 in (2.08 m)	225 lb (102 kg)	Fr	None	Belgrade, Serbia
G/F	33	Mark Plousis (W)	6 ft 5 in (1.96 m)	185 lb (84 kg)	Jr	Cardinal O'Hara	Havertown, PA
C	44	Hassan Attia	6 ft 10 in (2.08 m)	270 lb (122 kg)	Jr	Colby CC	Alexandria, Egypt
G	55	Jake Fay	6 ft 6 in (1.98 m)	205 lb (93 kg)	RS Jr	Brimmer and May; Fordham	Lynn, MA

Head coach

- John Gallagher (Saint Joseph's)

Assistant coach(es)

- Tom Devitt (Boston College)
- Jaret von Rosenberg (Hartford)
- Ivo Simović (Union (Serbia))

Legend

- (C) Team captain
- (S) Suspended
- (I) Ineligible
- (W) Walk-on
- Injured
- Current redshirt

Roster

== Schedule and results ==
Date time, TV	Rank^{#}	Opponent^{#}	Result	Record	Site (attendance) city, state
Non-conference regular season
11/11/2016*; 7:00 pm		Central Connecticut; Rivalry	L 60–75	0–1	Chase Arena at Reich Family Pavilion (2,317); Hartford, CT
11/15/2016*; 6:30 am, ESPN2		Niagara; Scarlet Knight Showcase/ College Hoops Tip-Off Marathon	W 82–78 ^{OT}	1–1	Chase Arena at Reich Family Pavilion (2,607); Hartford, CT
11/16/2016*; 7:00 pm		Rider	L 68–84	1–2	Chase Arena at Reich Family Pavilion (866); Hartford, CT
11/18/2016*; 7:00 pm		at Drexel; Scarlet Knight Showcase	L 73–87	1–3	Daskalakis Athletic Center (2,025); Philadelphia, PA
11/23/2016*; 2:00 pm		Appalachian State	L 61–70	1–4	Chase Arena at Reich Family Pavilion (704); Hartford, CT
11/25/2016*; 1:00 pm, ESPN3		at Rutgers; Scarlet Knight Showcase	L 75–77	1–5	Louis Brown Athletic Center (4,028); Piscataway, NJ
11/27/2016*; 1:00 pm, Telemundo		at North Texas; Scarlet Knight Showcase	L 78–81	1–6	The Super Pit; Denton, TX
11/30/2016*; 8:30 pm		LIU Brooklyn	L 68–75	1–7	Chase Arena at Reich Family Pavilion (1,413); Hartford, CT
12/03/2016*; 1:00 pm		at Sacred Heart	W 87–79 ^{OT}	2–7	William H. Pitt Center (303); Fairfield, CT
12/07/2016*; 7:00 pm		at Quinnipiac	L 79–99	2–8	TD Bank Sports Center (767); Hamden, CT
12/09/2016*; 7:00 pm, ACC Extra		at Boston College	W 65–63	3–8	Conte Forum (2,274); Chestnut Hill, MA
12/13/2016*; 7:00 pm		Dartmouth	W 70–66	4–8	Chase Arena at Reich Family Pavilion (905); Hartford, CT
12/22/2016*; 11:00 am		Navy	W 63–54	5–8	Chase Arena at Reich Family Pavilion (2,453); Hartford, CT
12/28/2016*; 7:00 pm		at Davidson	L 75–105	5–9	John M. Belk Arena (3,513); Davidson, NC
01/02/2017*; 7:00 pm		at Yale	L 72–88	5–10	John J. Lee Amphitheater (747); New Haven, CT
America East regular season
01/08/2017; 4:00 pm		at Vermont	L 54–85	5–11 (0–1)	Patrick Gym (2,192); Burlington, VT
01/11/2017; 7:00 pm		UMBC	L 68–84	5–12 (0–2)	Chase Arena at Reich Family Pavilion (717); Hartford, CT
01/14/2017; 2:00 pm		at UMass Lowell	L 55–71	5–13 (0–3)	Costello Athletic Center (512); Lowell, MA
01/16/2017; 1:00 pm		Maine	W 54–44	6–13 (1–3)	Chase Arena at Reich Family Pavilion (906); Hartford, CT
01/19/2017; 7:00 pm		at Stony Brook	L 64–80	6–14 (1–4)	Island Federal Credit Union Arena (2,520); Stony Brook, NY
01/22/2017; 1:00 pm		New Hampshire	L 56–81	6–15 (1–5)	Chase Arena at Reich Family Pavilion (931); Hartford, CT
01/25/2017; 7:00 pm, ESPN3		at Binghamton	L 55–76	6–16 (1–6)	Binghamton University Events Center (1,843); Vestal, NY
01/28/2017; 7:00 pm, ESPN3		Albany	L 61–74	6–17 (1–7)	Chase Arena at Reich Family Pavilion (1,423); Hartford, CT
02/04/2017; 7:00 pm		Vermont	L 66–79	6–18 (1–8)	Chase Arena at Reich Family Pavilion (1,898); Hartford, CT
02/06/2017; 7:00 pm		at Maine	L 41–52	6–19 (1–9)	Cross Insurance Center (880); Bangor, ME
02/09/2017; 7:00 pm, ESPN3		at UMBC	W 84–77	7–19 (2–9)	Retriever Activities Center (1,002); Catonsville, MD
02/12/2017; 2:00 pm, ESPN3		UMass Lowell	W 87–84 ^{OT}	8–19 (3–9)	Chase Arena at Reich Family Pavilion (882); Hartford, CT
02/15/2017; 7:00 pm, ESPN3		Stony Brook	L 54–66	8–20 (3–10)	Chase Arena at Reich Family Pavilion (1,182); Hartford, CT
02/18/2017; 1:00 pm, ESPN3		at New Hampshire	L 52–82	8–21 (3–11)	Lundholm Gym (827); Durham, NH
02/22/2017; 7:00 pm, ESPN3		Binghamton	W 76–69	9–21 (4–11)	Chase Arena at Reich Family Pavilion (1,731); Hartford, CT
02/25/2017; 7:00 pm, ESPN3		at Albany	L 62–80	9–22 (4–12)	SEFCU Arena (2,715); Albany, NY
America East tournament
03/01/2017; 7:30 pm, ESPN3	(6)	at (3) Albany; Quarterfinals	L 71–100	9–23	SEFCU Arena (1,693); Albany, NY
*Non-conference game. ^{#}Rankings from AP Poll. (#) Tournament seedings in parentheses. All times are in Eastern Time Source.
