= 2016–17 Stony Brook Seawolves men's basketball team =

American college basketball season

2016–17 Stony Brook Seawolves men's basketball

CBI, First round
- Conference: America East Conference
- Record: 18–14 (12–4 America East)
- Head coach: Jeff Boals (1st season)
- Assistant coaches: Geno Ford; Lamar Chapman; Bryan Weber
- Home arena: Island Federal Credit Union Arena

2016–17 America East Conference men's basketball standings
	Conf.				Overall
Team	W		L	PCT	W		L	PCT
Vermont †	16	–	0	1.000	29	–	6	.829
Stony Brook	12	–	4	.750	18	–	14	.563
Albany	10	–	6	.625	21	–	14	.600
New Hampshire	10	–	6	.625	20	–	12	.625
UMBC	9	–	7	.563	21	–	13	.618
UMass Lowell*	5	–	11	.313	11	–	20	.355
Hartford	4	–	12	.250	9	–	23	.281
Binghamton	3	–	13	.188	12	–	20	.375
Maine	3	–	13	.188	7	–	25	.219
† 2017 America East tournament winner * Ineligible for postseason during transition to Division I.

The 2016–17 Stony Brook Seawolves men's basketball team represented Stony Brook University in the 2016–17 NCAA Division I men's basketball season. The Seawolves were led by first-year head coach Jeff Boals and played their home games at Island Federal Credit Union Arena in Stony Brook, New York as members of the America East Conference. They finished the season 18–14, 12–4 in America East play to finish in second place. As the No. 2 seed in the America East tournament, they defeated Binghamton before losing to Albany in the semifinals. They were invited to the College Basketball Invitational where they lost in the first round to UIC.

== Previous season ==
The Seawolves finished the 2015–16 season 26–7, 14–2 in America East play to win the regular season championship. They defeated UMBC, Hartford, and Vermont to win the America East tournament. As a result, they earned the conference's automatic bid go the NCAA tournament, the first in school history. As a No. 13 seed, the Seawolves fell to Kentucky in the first round.

On March 20, 2016, it was announced that head coach Steve Pikiell would leave the school to accept the job as the new head coach for Rutgers. He finished at Stony Brook with an eleven-year record of 192–157. On April 8, the school announced they had hired Jeff Boals as head coach.

== Offseason ==
=== Departures ===
Name	Number	Pos.	Height	Weight	Year	Hometown	Notes
Deshaun Thrower	1	G	6'2"	205	Sophomore	Muskegon, MI	Transferred to Ferris State
Carson Puriefoy	10	G	6'0"	175	Senior	Wenonah, NJ	Graduated
Rayshaun McGrew	11	F	6'7"	230	Senior	Chicago, IL	Graduated
Jameel Warney	20	F	6'8"	260	Senior	Plainfield, NJ	Graduated

=== Incoming transfers ===
Name	Number	Pos.	Height	Weight	Year	Hometown	Previous School
Junior Saintel	11	F	6'7"	190	Junior	Absecon, NJ	Junior college transferred from Chipola College
UC Iroegbu	1	G	6'0"	180	Junior	Sacramento, CA	Junior college transferred from College of Southern Idaho
Blair Mendy	10	G	6'3"	190	Sophomore	San Jose, CA	Junior college transferred from City College of San Francisco

=== 2016 recruiting class ===
College recruiting information
Name	Hometown	School	Height	Weight	Commit date
Andrew Garcia #90 SF	Harlem, NY	The Master's School	6 ft 5 in (1.96 m)	200 lb (91 kg)	Sep 15, 2015
Andrew Garcia #90 SF	Recruit ratings: Scout: Rivals: (63)				
Michael Almonacy; PG	Brentwood, NY	Brentwood High School	6 ft 0 in (1.83 m)	160 lb (73 kg)	May 6, 2015
Michael Almonacy; PG	Recruit ratings: Scout: Rivals: (NR)				
Overall recruit ranking:
Note: In many cases, Scout, Rivals, 247Sports, On3, and ESPN may conflict in their listings of height and weight.; In these cases, the average was taken. ESPN grades are on a 100-point scale.; Sources: "2016 Team Ranking". Rivals.

=== 2017 recruiting class ===
College recruiting information (2017)
Name	Hometown	School	Height	Weight	Commit date
Elijah Olaniyi; SG	Newark, NJ	East Side High School	6 ft 4 in (1.93 m)	N/A	
Elijah Olaniyi; SG	Recruit ratings: Scout: Rivals: (NR)				
Corry Long; PG	Cincinnati, OH	Hughes High School	6 ft 2 in (1.88 m)	160 lb (73 kg)	Sep 9, 2016
Corry Long; PG	Recruit ratings: Scout: Rivals: (NR)				
Jordan McKenzie; PG	Concord, NC	Hargrave Military Academy	6 ft 1 in (1.85 m)	180 lb (82 kg)	Sep 20, 2016
Jordan McKenzie; PG	Recruit ratings: Scout: Rivals: (NR)				
Anthony Ochefu; PF	West Chester, PA	Westtown School	6 ft 8 in (2.03 m)	N/A	Jul 7, 2016
Anthony Ochefu; PF	Recruit ratings: Scout: Rivals: (NR)				
Overall recruit ranking:
Note: In many cases, Scout, Rivals, 247Sports, On3, and ESPN may conflict in their listings of height and weight.; In these cases, the average was taken. ESPN grades are on a 100-point scale.; Sources: "2017 Team Ranking". Rivals.

== Preseason ==
Stony Brook was picked to finish seventh in the preseason America East poll.

== Roster ==
2016–17 Stony Brook Seawolves men's basketball team
Players
Coaches

Pos.	#	Name	Height	Weight	Year	Previous school	Hometown
G	1	UC Iroegbu	6 ft 1 in (1.85 m)	184 lb (83 kg)	Jr	College of Southern Idaho	Sacramento, California
G	2	Michael Almonacy	6 ft 1 in (1.85 m)	170 lb (77 kg)	Fr	Brentwood High School	Brentwood, New York
G	3	Kameron Mitchell	6 ft 4 in (1.93 m)	195 lb (88 kg)	RS Sr	Mandarin High School	Jacksonville, Florida
G	4	Tim Donohoe (W)	6 ft 3 in (1.91 m)	185 lb (84 kg)	Jr	The Albany Academy	Saratoga Springs, New York
G	10	Blair Mendy (W,S)	6 ft 3 in (1.91 m)	190 lb (86 kg)	So	City College of San Francisco	San Jose, California
G/F	11	Junior Saintel	6 ft 7 in (2.01 m)	190 lb (86 kg)	Jr	Chipola College	Mays Landing, New Jersey
F	12	Tyrell Sturdivant	6 ft 7 in (2.01 m)	225 lb (102 kg)	Jr	Chester High School	Chester, Pennsylvania
G/F	15	Akwasi Yeboah	6 ft 6 in (1.98 m)	230 lb (104 kg)	RS Fr	Barking Abbey School	Chigwell, England
G/F	22	Bryan Sekunda	6 ft 6 in (1.98 m)	205 lb (93 kg)	Jr	State College Area High School	State College, Pennsylvania
G/F	23	Andrew Garcia	6 ft 5 in (1.96 m)	200 lb (91 kg)	Fr	The Master's School (CT)	Harlem, New York
G/F	24	Roland Nyama	6 ft 6 in (1.98 m)	210 lb (95 kg)	RS Jr	Holderness School	Frankfurt, Germany
F	32	Jakub Petras	6 ft 11 in (2.11 m)	260 lb (118 kg)	Jr	Canarias Basketball Academy	Rajec, Slovakia
G	34	Lucas Woodhouse	6 ft 3 in (1.91 m)	180 lb (82 kg)	RS Sr	Longwood	Greenlawn, New York
F/C	42	Alonzo Campbell	7 ft 0 in (2.13 m)	230 lb (104 kg)	RS Fr	Lincoln High School	Columbus, Ohio

Head coach

- Jeff Boals (Ohio)

Assistant coach(es)

- Geno Ford (Ohio)
- Lamar Chapman (Lane College)
- Bryan Weber (Akron)

Legend

- (C) Team captain
- (S) Suspended
- (I) Ineligible
- (W) Walk-on
- Injured
- Current redshirt

Roster

== Schedule and results ==
Date time, TV	Rank^{#}	Opponent^{#}	Result	Record	Site (attendance) city, state
Exhibition
11/04/2016*; 7:00 pm		Farmingdale State	W 94–48		Island Federal Credit Union Arena; Stony Brook, NY
Non-conference regular season
11/11/2016*; 7:00 pm		Columbia	L 66–73	0–1	Island Federal Credit Union Arena (3,385); Stony Brook, NY
11/20/2016*; 1:00 pm, ACCN Extra		at Boston College; Barclays Center Classic	L 75–82	0–2	Conte Forum (2,108); Chestnut Hill, MA
11/22/2016*; 7:00 pm, BTN		at Maryland; Barclays Center Classic	L 63–77	0–3	Xfinity Center (14,034); College Park, MD
11/25/2016*; 5:00 pm		at Towson; Barclays Center Classic	L 63–88	0–4	SECU Arena (1,322); Towson, MD
11/26/2016*; 5:00 pm		vs. Hampton; Barclays Center Classic	W 76–66	1–4	SECU Arena; Towson, MD
11/30/2016*; 7:00 pm		Loyola (MD)	L 70–71	1–5	Island Federal Credit Union Arena (2,387); Stony Brook, NY
12/03/2016*; 7:00 pm, ESPN3		Northeastern	W 77–75	2–5	Island Federal Credit Union Arena (2,883); Stony Brook, NY
12/06/2016*; 7:00 pm, ESPN3		Lehigh	W 62–57	3–5	Island Federal Credit Union Arena (2,295); Stony Brook, NY
12/10/2016*; 7:00 pm, ESPN3		Rutgers	L 66–71	3–6	Island Federal Credit Union Arena (4,009); Stony Brook, NY
12/13/2016*; 7:00 pm		at Hofstra	L 58–96	3–7	Mack Sports Complex (2,352); Hempstead, NY
12/17/2016*; 1:00 pm		at Saint Francis (PA)	W 75–63	4–7	DeGol Arena (336); Loretto, PA
12/28/2016*; 7:00 pm, ESPN3		NJIT	L 61–64	4–8	Island Federal Credit Union Arena (3,130); Stony Brook, NY
12/31/2016*; 2:00 pm		at Brown	W 92–89	5–8	Pizzitola Sports Center (617); Providence, RI
America East regular season
01/05/2017; 7:00 pm, ESPN3		at New Hampshire	W 59–56	6–8 (1–0)	Lundholm Gym (624); Durham, NH
01/08/2017; 2:00 pm, ESPN3		Albany	W 72–70	7–8 (2–0)	Island Federal Credit Union Arena (2,962); Stony Brook, NY
01/14/2017; 2:00 pm, ESPN3		at Maine	W 74–54	8–8 (3–0)	Cross Insurance Center; Bangor, ME
01/16/2017; 2:00 pm, ESPN3		at UMass Lowell	W 86–75	9–8 (4–0)	Costello Athletic Center (619); Lowell, MA
01/19/2017; 7:00 pm, ESPN3		Hartford	W 80–64	10–8 (5–0)	Island Federal Credit Union Arena (2,520); Stony Brook, NY
01/22/2017; 2:00 pm		at Binghamton	L 67–71	10–9 (5–1)	Binghamton University Events Center (2,189); Vestal, NY
01/25/2017; 7:00 pm, ESPN3		UMBC	W 83–73	11–9 (6–1)	Island Federal Credit Union Arena (3,013); Stony Brook, NY
01/28/2017; 7:00 pm, ESPN3		Vermont	L 64–71	11–10 (6–2)	Island Federal Credit Union Arena (4,009); Stony Brook, NY
02/01/2017; 7:00 pm, ESPN3		New Hampshire	W 64–61	12–10 (7–2)	Island Federal Credit Union Arena (3,347); Stony Brook, NY
02/04/2017; 7:00 pm		at Albany	W 72–65	13–10 (8–2)	SEFCU Arena (4,538); Albany, NY
02/06/2017; 7:00 pm, ESPN3		UMass Lowell	W 83–72	14–10 (9–2)	Island Federal Credit Union Arena (2,615); Stony Brook, NY
02/12/2017; 2:00 pm, ESPN3		Maine	W 67–66	15–10 (10–2)	Island Federal Credit Union Arena (4,009); Stony Brook, NY
02/15/2017; 7:00 pm, ESPN3		at Hartford	W 66–54	16–10 (11–2)	Chase Arena at Reich Family Pavilion (1,182); Hartford, CT
02/18/2017; 7:00 pm, ESPN3		Binghamton	W 76–55	17–10 (12–2)	Island Federal Credit Union Arena (4,209); Stony Brook, NY
02/22/2017; 7:00 pm, ESPN3		at UMBC	L 52–65	17–11 (12–3)	Retriever Activities Center (991); Catonsville, MD
02/25/2017; 2:00 pm, ESPN3		at Vermont	L 51–66	17–12 (12–4)	Patrick Gym (3,266); Burlington, VT
America East tournament
03/01/2017; 7:00 pm, ESPN3	(2)	(7) Binghamton; Quarterfinals	W 70–60	18–12	Island Federal Credit Union Arena (2,750); Stony Brook, NY
03/06/2017; 7:30 pm, ESPN3	(2)	(3) Albany; Semifinals	L 56–63	18–13	Island Federal Credit Union Arena (4,009); Stony Brook, NY
CBI
03/16/2017*; 8:00 pm		at UIC; First round	L 69–71	18–14	UIC Pavilion (1,197); Chicago, IL
*Non-conference game. ^{#}Rankings from AP Poll. (#) Tournament seedings in parentheses. All times are in Eastern Time.
