= 2016–17 Maine Black Bears men's basketball team =

American college basketball season

2016–17 Maine Black Bears men's basketball
- Conference: America East Conference
- Record: 7–25 (3–13 America East)
- Head coach: Bob Walsh (3rd season)
- Assistant coaches: Matt O'Brien; Antone Gray; Tylee Schlegel
- Home arena: Cross Insurance Center

2016–17 America East Conference men's basketball standings
	Conf.				Overall
Team	W		L	PCT	W		L	PCT
Vermont †	16	–	0	1.000	29	–	6	.829
Stony Brook	12	–	4	.750	18	–	14	.563
Albany	10	–	6	.625	21	–	14	.600
New Hampshire	10	–	6	.625	20	–	12	.625
UMBC	9	–	7	.563	21	–	13	.618
UMass Lowell*	5	–	11	.313	11	–	20	.355
Hartford	4	–	12	.250	9	–	23	.281
Binghamton	3	–	13	.188	12	–	20	.375
Maine	3	–	13	.188	7	–	25	.219
† 2017 America East tournament winner * Ineligible for postseason during transition to Division I.

The 2016–17 Maine Black Bears men's basketball team represented the University of Maine during the 2016–17 NCAA Division I men's basketball season. The Black Bears, led by third-year head coach Bob Walsh, played their home games at Cross Insurance Center as members of the America East Conference. They finished the season 7–25 (3–13 in America East) to finish in a tie for eighth place. They lost in the quarter-finals of the America East tournament to Vermont.

== Previous season ==
The Black Bears finished the 2015–16 season with an 8–22 overall record and 4–12 in conference. They finished in a tie for seventh place in America East play. They lost in the quarterfinals of the America East tournament to Vermont.

== Preseason ==
Maine was picked to finish last in the preseason America East poll.

== Departures ==
Name	Number	Pos.	Height	Weight	Year	Hometown	Notes
Lavar Harewood	0	G	6'3"	200	Freshman	Brooklyn, NY	Transferred to Cloud County CC
Kevin Little	2	G	6'0"	160	Sophomore	Wyandanch, NY	Transferred to Colorado State
Devine Eke	5	F	6'7"	195	Freshman	Plainfield, NJ	Transferred to Rider
Shaun Lawton	10	G	6'5"	190	Senior	Harlem, NY	Graduated
Walter King	13	G	6'0"	195	Freshman	Peekskill, NY	Walk-on; transferred to NYIT
Issac Vann	23	F	6'6"	190	Freshman	Bridgeport, CT	Transferred to VCU
Till Gloger	25	F	6'8"	220	Senior	Bochum, Germany	Graduated

=== Incoming transfers ===
Name	Number	Pos.	Height	Weight	Year	Hometown	Previous School
Dusan Majstorovic	33	G	6'5"	195	Sophomore	Novi Sad, Serbia	Transferred from La Salle. Under NCAA transfer rules, Majstorovic will have to sit out from the 2016–17 season. Will have three years of remaining eligibility.

== 2016 incoming recruits ==
College recruiting information
Name	Hometown	School	Height	Weight	Commit date
Danny Evans #106 PG	Andover, MA	Phillips Academy	6 ft 4 in (1.93 m)	N/A	Mar 28, 2016
Danny Evans #106 PG	Recruit ratings: Scout: Rivals: (58)				
Andrew Fleming #132 PF	South Paris, ME	Oxford Hills High School	6 ft 7 in (2.01 m)	210 lb (95 kg)	Oct 3, 2015
Andrew Fleming #132 PF	Recruit ratings: Scout: Rivals: (57)				
Marcus Floyd; PG	Wilmington, DE	Sunrise Christian Academy	5 ft 9 in (1.75 m)	165 lb (75 kg)	Oct 3, 2015
Marcus Floyd; PG	Recruit ratings: Scout: Rivals: (57)				
Overall recruit ranking:
Note: In many cases, Scout, Rivals, 247Sports, On3, and ESPN may conflict in their listings of height and weight.; In these cases, the average was taken. ESPN grades are on a 100-point scale.; Sources: "2016 Team Ranking". Rivals.

== Roster ==
2016–17 Maine Black Bears men's basketball team
Players
Coaches

Pos.	#	Name	Height	Weight	Year	Previous school	Hometown
F	0	Andrew Fleming	6 ft 7 in (2.01 m)	222 lb (101 kg)	Fr	Oxford Hills HS	South Paris, ME
G	1	Aaron Calixte	5 ft 11 in (1.8 m)	187 lb (85 kg)	Jr	Stoughton HS/Lee Academy	Stoughton, MA
G	2	Austin Howard	6 ft 1 in (1.85 m)	177 lb (80 kg)	Jr	Eastern HS; Parkland College	Lexington, KY
G	3	Ryan Bernstein (W)	6 ft 0 in (1.83 m)	183 lb (83 kg)	So	Archbishop Stepinac HS	Bronx, NY
F	4	Marko Pirovic	6 ft 7 in (2.01 m)	210 lb (95 kg)	Sr	Robert F. Hall Secondary School	Bolton, ON
G	5	Danny Evans	6 ft 4 in (1.93 m)	203 lb (92 kg)	Fr	Allerton HS/Phillips Academy	Leeds, England
G	10	Wesley Myers	6 ft 2 in (1.88 m)	186 lb (84 kg)	RS Jr	Boys and Girls HS; Niagara	Brooklyn, NY
F	11	Ilija Stojiljkovic	6 ft 7 in (2.01 m)	223 lb (101 kg)	So	Pravno-Poslovna skola Nis	Niš, Serbia
G	12	C. J. Ward (W)	5 ft 11 in (1.8 m)	170 lb (77 kg)	Jr	North HS/Tabor Academy	Plymouth, MA
G	21	Ilker Er	6 ft 6 in (1.98 m)	212 lb (96 kg)	Jr	Arlington Country Day/San Jacinto College	Istanbul, Turkey
G	22	Garvey Melmed (W)	6 ft 1 in (1.85 m)	193 lb (88 kg)	Jr	Old Town HS	Greenbush, ME
G	23	JaQuan McKennon	5 ft 10 in (1.78 m)	190 lb (86 kg)	So	Thomas Jefferson HS; Broward College	Queens, NY
G	31	Troy Reid-Knight	6 ft 0 in (1.83 m)	217 lb (98 kg)	Sr	Vaughan Secondary/Thornlea Secondary	Vaughan, ON
G	32	Dennis Ashley (W)	6 ft 1 in (1.85 m)	169 lb (77 kg)	RS Fr	St. Monica	Los Angeles, CA
G	33	Dusan Majstorovic (I) (redshirt)	6 ft 5 in (1.96 m)	210 lb (95 kg)	So	Lee Academy; La Salle	Novi Sad, Serbia
F/C	50	Vincent Eze	6 ft 8 in (2.03 m)	218 lb (99 kg)	RS Fr	Notre Dame HS	Putnam, CT
G/F	55	Garet Beal	6 ft 6 in (1.98 m)	237 lb (108 kg)	Sr	Jonesport-Beals HS	Beals, ME

Head coach

- Bob Walsh (Iona)

Assistant coach(es)

- Matt O'Brien (Maine)
- Antone Gray (Rhode Island College)
- Tyler Schlegel (Rowan)

Legend

- (C) Team captain
- (S) Suspended
- (I) Ineligible
- (W) Walk-on
- Injured
- Current redshirt

Roster

== Schedule and results ==
Date time, TV	Rank^{#}	Opponent^{#}	Result	Record	Site (attendance) city, state
Exhibition
10/29/2016*; 2:00 pm		Husson	W 108–79		Cross Insurance Center (1,257); Bangor, ME
11/05/2016*; 3:30 pm		Maine–Fort Kent	L 75–80		Memorial Gym; Orono, ME
Non-conference regular season
11/11/2016*; 9:00 pm, ACCN Extra		at Virginia Tech	L 67–80	0–1	Cassell Coliseum (9,567); Blacksburg, VA
11/13/2016*; 2:00 pm		at Longwood	W 80–58	1–1	Willett Hall (1,128); Farmville, VA
11/19/2016*; 4:00 pm		at Boston University; Steve Wright Classic	L 78–102	1–3	Case Gym (672); Boston, MA
11/20/2016*; 2:00 pm		vs. Northeastern; Steve Wright Classic	L 72–80	1–3	Case Gym (460); Boston, MA
11/21/2016*; 3:00 pm		vs. LIU Brooklyn; Steve Wright Classic	L 66–71	1–4	Case Gym (52); Boston, MA
11/26/2016*; 2:00 pm		Maine–Presque Isle	W 96–45	2–4	Cross Insurance Center (403); Bangor, ME
11/30/2016*; 7:00 pm		Central Connecticut	L 61–82	2–5	Cross Insurance Center (836); Bangor, ME
12/03/2016*; 5:30 pm, ESPN2		at No. 5 Duke	L 55–94	2–6	Cameron Indoor Stadium (9,314); Durham, NC
12/07/2016*; 5:30 pm		Holy Cross	W 55–53	3–6	Cross Insurance Center (1,406); Bangor, ME
12/10/2016*; 2:00 pm		at Dartmouth	W 73–68	4–6	Leede Arena (682); Hanover, NH
12/18/2016*; 1:00 pm		Qunnipiac	L 75–85	4–7	Cross Insurance Arena (1,279); Portland, ME
12/20/2016*; 8:30 pm, FS1		at Providence	L 59–79	4–8	Dunkin' Donuts Center (4,257); Providence, RI
12/22/2016*; 3:30 pm		at Brown	L 77–82	4–9	Pizzitola Sports Center (650); Providence, RI
12/30/2016*; 7:00 pm, ESPN3		at Buffalo	L 60–79	4–10	Alumni Arena (2,784); Amherst, NY
01/02/2017*; 2:00 pm, ESPN3		Columbia	L 73–98	4–11	Cross Insurance Center (942); Bangor, ME
America East regular season
01/05/2017; 7:00 pm, ESPN3		Vermont	L 77–90	4–12 (0–1)	Cross Insurance Center (798); Bangor, ME
01/08/2017; 12:00 pm, ESPN3		at UMBC	L 64–75	4–13 (0–2)	Retriever Activities Center (604); Catonsville, MD
01/11/2017; 7:00 pm		UMass Lowell	W 73–71	5–13 (1–2)	Cross Insurance Center (797); Bangor, ME
01/14/2017; 2:00 pm, ESPN3		Stony Brook	L 54–74	5–14 (1–3)	Cross Insurance Center; Bangor, ME
01/16/2017; 1:00 pm		at Hartford	L 44–54	5–15 (1–4)	Chase Arena at Reich Family Pavilion (906); Hartford, CT
01/19/2017; 7:00 pm		New Hampshire	L 63–74	5–16 (1–5)	Cross Insurance Center; Bangor, ME
01/22/2017; 2:00 pm		at Albany	L 63–81	5–17 (1–6)	SEFCU Arena (2,513); Albany, NY
01/29/2017; 2:00 pm, ESPN3		Binghamton	L 54–65	5–18 (1–7)	Cross Insurance Center (987); Bangor, ME
02/01/2017; 7:00 pm		at Vermont	L 53–74	5–19 (1–8)	Patrick Gym (2,384); Burlington, VT
02/04/2017; 1:00 pm		UMBC	L 71–83	5–20 (1–9)	Cross Insurance Center (864); Bangor, ME
02/06/2017; 7:00 pm		Hartford	W 52–41	6–20 (2–9)	Cross Insurance Center (880); Bangor, ME
02/09/2017; 7:00 pm, ESPN3		at UMass Lowell	L 68–100	6–21 (2–10)	Costello Athletic Center (195); Lowell, MA
02/12/2017; 2:00 pm, ESPN3		at Stony Brook	L 66–67	6–22 (2–11)	Island Federal Credit Union Arena (4,009); Stony Brook, NY
02/15/2017; 7:00 pm, ESPN3		at New Hampshire	L 51–64	6–23 (2–12)	Lundholm Gym (739); Durham, NH
02/19/2017; 2:00 pm, ESPN3		Albany	L 56–74	6–24 (2–13)	Cross Insurance Center (727); Bangor, ME
02/25/2017; 2:00 pm, ESPN3		at Binghamton	W 72–71	7–24 (3–13)	Binghamton University Events Center (2,970); Vestal, NY
America East tournament
03/01/2017; 7:00 pm, ESPN3	(8)	at (1) Vermont; Quarterfinals	L 41–86	7–25	Patrick Gym (3,266); Burlington, VT
*Non-conference game. ^{#}Rankings from AP Poll. (#) Tournament seedings in parentheses. All times are in Eastern Time.
