= 2016–17 Binghamton Bearcats men's basketball team =

American college basketball season

2016–17 Binghamton Bearcats men's basketball
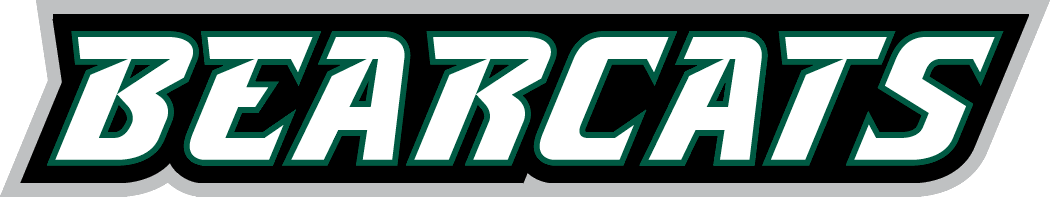
- Conference: America East Conference
- Record: 12–20 (3–13 America East)
- Head coach: Tommy Dempsey (5th season)
- Assistant coaches: Bryan Goodman; Herb Courtney; Chretien Lukusa
- Home arena: Binghamton University Events Center

2016–17 America East Conference men's basketball standings
	Conf.				Overall
Team	W		L	PCT	W		L	PCT
Vermont †	16	–	0	1.000	29	–	6	.829
Stony Brook	12	–	4	.750	18	–	14	.563
Albany	10	–	6	.625	21	–	14	.600
New Hampshire	10	–	6	.625	20	–	12	.625
UMBC	9	–	7	.563	21	–	13	.618
UMass Lowell*	5	–	11	.313	11	–	20	.355
Hartford	4	–	12	.250	9	–	23	.281
Binghamton	3	–	13	.188	12	–	20	.375
Maine	3	–	13	.188	7	–	25	.219
† 2017 America East tournament winner * Ineligible for postseason during transition to Division I.

The 2016–17 Binghamton Bearcats men's basketball team represented Binghamton University during the 2016–17 NCAA Division I men's basketball season. The Bearcats, led by fifth-year head coach Tommy Dempsey, played their home games at the Binghamton University Events Center as members of the America East Conference. They finished the season 12–20, 3–13 in America East play to finish in a tie for eighth place. They lost in the quarterfinals of the America East tournament to Stony Brook.

== Previous season ==
The Bearcats finished the season 8–22, 5–11 in America East play to finish in sixth place. They lost in the quarterfinals of the America East tournament to New Hampshire.

== Preseason ==
Binghamton was picked to finish fourth in the preseason America East poll. Willie Rodriguez, Jr. was selected to the preseason All-America East team.

== Departures ==
Name	Number	Pos.	Height	Weight	Year	Hometown	Notes
Karon Walker	0	G	6'4"	210	Senior	Camden, NJ	Graduated
Romello Walker	11	G	6'6"	195	Sophomore	Fort Lauderdale, FL	Transferred to Midwestern State

== 2016 incoming recruits ==
College recruiting information
Name	Hometown	School	Height	Weight	Commit date
Tyler Stewart #90 SF	Silver Springs, MD	St. Andrews Episcopal School	6 ft 6 in (1.98 m)	N/A	Oct 14, 2015
Tyler Stewart #90 SF	Recruit ratings: Scout: Rivals: (63)				
Fard Muhammad; PG	Merrillville, IN	Montverde Academy Prep	6 ft 0 in (1.83 m)	N/A	Feb 14, 2016
Fard Muhammad; PG	Recruit ratings: Scout: Rivals: (NR)				
Overall recruit ranking:
Note: In many cases, Scout, Rivals, 247Sports, On3, and ESPN may conflict in their listings of height and weight.; In these cases, the average was taken. ESPN grades are on a 100-point scale.; Sources: "2016 Team Ranking". Rivals.

== Roster ==
2016–17 Binghamton Bearcats men's basketball team
Players
Coaches

Pos.	#	Name	Height	Weight	Year	Previous school	Hometown
G	0	Fard Muhammad	6 ft 0 in (1.83 m)	180 lb (82 kg)	Fr	Montverde Academy	Windermere, FL
G	1	Marlon Beck	5 ft 11 in (1.8 m)	175 lb (79 kg)	Sr	Maret	Bowie, MD
G	4	Timmy Rose	6 ft 1 in (1.85 m)	175 lb (79 kg)	So	Scranton Prep	Scranton, PA
G/F	5	Tyler Stewart	6 ft 7 in (2.01 m)	180 lb (82 kg)	So	St. Andrew's Episcopal	Silver Springs, MD
G	10	Yosef Yacob	6 ft 0 in (1.83 m)	175 lb (79 kg)	Jr	Archbishop John Carroll	Chester, PA
G	12	John Rinaldi	6 ft 2 in (1.88 m)	195 lb (88 kg)	Sr	Dumore	Dunmore, PA
F	14	Jordan McRae (W)	6 ft 6 in (1.98 m)	200 lb (91 kg)	So	Half Hollow Hills East	Dix Hills, NY
F	15	Bobby Ahearn	6 ft 6 in (1.98 m)	225 lb (102 kg)	Jr	Marshfield/Marianapolis Prep	Marshfeild, MA
F	20	Caleb Stewart (W)	6 ft 9 in (2.06 m)	195 lb (88 kg)	Jr	Mekeel Christian Academy; St. Leo	Glenville, NY
G	22	Everson Davis (W)	6 ft 3 in (1.91 m)	185 lb (84 kg)	So	Peddie School	Saint Kitts
G/F	25	Justin McFadden	6 ft 5 in (1.96 m)	210 lb (95 kg)	Jr	Lower Marion	Philadelphia, PA
G/F	30	John Schurman	6 ft 6 in (1.98 m)	210 lb (95 kg)	So	Fayetteville–Manlius	Syracuse, NY
F	32	Thomas Bruce	6 ft 9 in (2.06 m)	225 lb (102 kg)	So	DeMatha Catholic	Washington, D.C.
G	33	J. C. Show	6 ft 3 in (1.91 m)	205 lb (93 kg)	So	Abington Heights; Bucknell	Clarks Summit, PA
F/C	41	Dusan Perovic	6 ft 9 in (2.06 m)	230 lb (104 kg)	Jr	South Kent School	Podgorica, Montenegro
F	42	Willie Rodriguez	6 ft 6 in (1.98 m)	200 lb (91 kg)	Jr	East River/Cheshire Academy	Orlando, FL

Head coach

- Tommy Dempsey (Susquehanna)

Assistant coach(es)

- Bryan Goodman (Barat College)
- Herb Courtney (Delaware)
- Chretien Lukusa (Boston University)

Legend

- (C) Team captain
- (S) Suspended
- (I) Ineligible
- (W) Walk-on
- Injured
- Current redshirt

Roster

== Schedule and results ==
Date time, TV	Rank^{#}	Opponent^{#}	Result	Record	Site (attendance) city, state
Non-conference regular season
11/11/2016*; 7:30 pm		Cornell	W 68–62	1–0	Binghamton University Events Center (3,278); Vestal, NY
11/14/2016*; 6:30 pm, FS1		at St. John's; Battle 4 Atlantis	L 61–77	1–1	Carnesecca Arena (4,969); Queens, NY
11/16/2016*; 7:00 pm		Central Connecticut	W 72–70	2–1	Binghamton University Events Center (1,601); Vestal, NY
11/18/2016*; 7:00 pm		at VCU; Battle 4 Atlantis	L 42–81	2–2	Siegel Center (7,637); Richmond, VA
11/22/2016*; 7:00 pm		at Ave Maria	W 95–77	3–2	Tom Golisano Fieldhouse (237); Ave Maria, FL
11/23/2016*; 7:00 pm		at Florida Gulf Coast; Battle 4 Atlantis	L 53–69	3–3	Alico Arena (3,684); Fort Myers, FL
11/24/2016*; 7:00 pm		vs. Long Beach State; Battle 4 Atlantis	W 72–64	4–3	Alico Arena (102); Fort Myers, FL
11/27/2016*; 7:00 pm		at FIU	L 57–74	4–4	FIU Arena (710); Miami, FL
11/30/2016*; 7:00 pm		Mansfield	W 91–71	5–4	Binghamton University Events Center (1,835); Vestal, NY
12/03/2016*; 7:00 pm		at Saint Francis (PA)	W 73–70	6–4	DeGol Arena (671); Loretto, PA
12/07/2016*; 7:00 pm		at Colgate	W 73–64	7–4	Cotterell Court (630); Hamilton, NY
12/10/2016*; 2:00 pm		Loyola (MD)	L 85–90 ^{OT}	7–5	Binghamton University Events Center (4,037); Vestal, NY
12/17/2016*; 2:00 pm		Delaware State	W 85-66	8-5	Binghamton University Events Center (2,001); Vestal, NY
12/21/2016*; 7:00 pm		at Army	L 60–71	8–6	Christl Arena (713); West Point, NY
12/30/2016*; 4:00 pm, ESPN3		Marywood	W 101–54	9–6	Binghamton University Events Center (2,440); Vestal, NY
America East regular season
01/05/2017; 7:00 pm, ESPN3		at UMBC	L 71–85	9–7 (0–1)	Retriever Activities Center (623); Catonsville, MD
01/08/2017; 2:00 pm, ESPN3		UMass Lowell	L 75–79	9–8 (0–2)	Binghamton University Events Center (1,689); Vestal, NY
01/11/2017; 7:00 pm		Vermont	L 50–67	9–9 (0–3)	Binghamton University Events Center (1,878); Vestal, NY
01/14/2017; 1:00 pm		at New Hampshire	L 66–73	9–10 (0–4)	Lundholm Gym (682); Durham, NH
01/19/2017; 7:00 pm		at Albany	L 65–84	9–11 (0–5)	SEFCU Arena (2,308); Albany, NY
01/22/2017; 2:00 pm		Stony Brook	W 71–67	10–11 (1–5)	Binghamton University Events Center (2,189); Vestal, NY
01/25/2017; 7:00 pm, ESPN3		Hartford	W 76–55	11–11 (2–5)	Binghamton University Events Center (1,843); Vestal, NY
01/29/2017; 2:00 pm, ESPN3		at Maine	W 65–54	12–11 (3–5)	Cross Insurance Center (987); Bangor, ME
02/01/2017; 7:00 pm, ESPN3		UMBC	L 74–92	12–12 (3–6)	Binghamton University Events Center (4,939); Vestal, NY
02/04/2017; 2:00 pm		at UMass Lowell	L 59–60	12–13 (3–7)	Costello Athletic Center (523); Lowell, MA
02/06/2017; 7:00 pm		at Vermont	L 51–71	12–14 (3–8)	Patrick Gym (2,615); Burlington, VT
02/09/2017; 7:00 pm, ESPN3		Albany	L 54–66	12–15 (3–9)	Binghamton University Events Center (2,241); Vestal, NY
02/12/2017; 2:00 pm, ESPN3		New Hampshire	L 55–63	12–16 (3–10)	Binghamton University Events Center (2,074); Vestal, NY
02/18/2017; 7:00 pm, ESPN3		at Stony Brook	L 55–76	12–17 (3–11)	Island Federal Credit Union Arena (4,209); Stony Brook, NY
02/22/2017; 7:00 pm, ESPN3		at Hartford	L 69–76	12–18 (3–12)	Chase Arena at Reich Family Pavilion (1,731); Hartford, CT
02/25/2017; 2:00 pm, ESPN3		Maine	L 71–72	12–19 (3–13)	Binghamton University Events Center (2,970); Vestal, NY
America East tournament
03/01/2017; 7:00 pm, ESPN3	(7)	at (2) Stony Brook; Quarterfinals	L 60–70	12–20	Island Federal Credit Union Arena (2,750); Stony Brook, NY
*Non-conference game. ^{#}Rankings from AP Poll. (#) Tournament seedings in parentheses. All times are in Eastern Time.
