= UMBC Aquatic Complex =

Swimming facility at the University of Maryland, Baltimore County

- Location: Retriever Activities Center; University of Maryland, Baltimore County; 1000 Hilltop Circle; Baltimore, Maryland 21250
- Owner: UMBC
- Operator: UMBC
- Capacity: 2,000

Construction
- Opened: 1966

Tenant
- UMBC Retrievers

The UMBC Aquatic Complex is located in the center of the UMBC campus inside the Retriever Activities Center includes both indoor and outdoor pools. The indoor complex features an eight-lane, 25-yard pool and a separate 13-foot diving well with 1-meter and 3-meter springboards.

The outdoor pool complex consists of a heated, Olympic size, eight-lane, 50-meter pool, which can be converted to 20 lanes, 12 of which measure 25-yards and additional eight 25-meter lanes. The facility has hosted numerous local and regional competitions, including the 1999 Eastern Zone Championships and the 2003 Speedo Champions Series.
