= 2017 America East men's basketball tournament =

- Classification: Division I
- Season: 2016–17
- Teams: 8
- Site: Campus sites
- Champions: Vermont Catamounts (6th title)
- Winning coach: John Becker (2nd title)
- MVP: Payton Henson (Vermont)
- Television: ESPN2

2016–17 America East Conference men's basketball standings
| | Conf. | | | | Overall |
| Team | W | | L | PCT | W | | L | PCT |
|---|---|---|---|---|---|---|---|---|
| Vermont † | 16 | – | 0 | 1.000 | 29 | – | 6 | .829 |
| Stony Brook | 12 | – | 4 | .750 | 18 | – | 14 | .563 |
| Albany | 10 | – | 6 | .625 | 21 | – | 14 | .600 |
| New Hampshire | 10 | – | 6 | .625 | 20 | – | 12 | .625 |
| UMBC | 9 | – | 7 | .563 | 21 | – | 13 | .618 |
| UMass Lowell* | 5 | – | 11 | .313 | 11 | – | 20 | .355 |
| Hartford | 4 | – | 12 | .250 | 9 | – | 23 | .281 |
| Binghamton | 3 | – | 13 | .188 | 12 | – | 20 | .375 |
| Maine | 3 | – | 13 | .188 | 7 | – | 25 | .219 |
† 2017 America East tournament winner * Ineligible for postseason during transition to Division I.

The 2017 America East men's basketball tournament is the postseason men's basketball tournament for the America East Conference, which was held on March 1, 6, and 11, 2017. All games of the tournament were played on campus sites hosted by the higher-seeded school. Vermont, the No. 1 seed in the tournament defeated Albany in the championship game to win the tournament championship. As a result, they received the conference's automatic bid to the NCAA tournament.

== Seeds ==
Only eight of the nine conference teams were eligible for the tournament (UMass Lowell was ineligible due to its transition to Division I). The teams were seeded by record in conference, with a tiebreaker system to seed teams with identical conference records.

| Seed | School | Conference | Tiebreaker |
|---|---|---|---|
| 1 | Vermont | 16–0 | |
| 2 | Stony Brook | 12–4 | |
| 3 | Albany | 10–6 | 2–0 vs. UMBC |
| 4 | New Hampshire | 10–6 | 1–1 vs. UMBC |
| 5 | UMBC | 9–7 | |
| 6 | Hartford | 4–12 | |
| 7 | Binghamton | 3–13 | 1–1 vs. Stony Brook |
| 8 | Maine | 3–13 | 0–2 vs. Stony Brook |

== Schedule ==
| Game | Time* | Matchup | Score | Television | Attendance |
Quarterfinals – Wednesday, March 1
| 1 | 7:00 pm | No. 8 Maine at No. 1 Vermont | 41–86 | ESPN3 | 3,266 |
| 2 | 7:00 pm | No. 7 Binghamton at No. 2 Stony Brook | 60–70 | ESPN3 | 2,750 |
| 3 | 7:30 pm | No. 6 Hartford at No. 3 Albany | 71–100 | ESPN3 | 1,693 |
| 4 | 7:30 pm | No. 5 UMBC at No. 4 New Hampshire | 65–74 | ESPN3 | 1,473 |
Semifinals – Monday, March 6
| 5 | 7:00 PM | No. 4 New Hampshire at No. 1 Vermont | 41–74 | ESPN3 | 3,266 |
| 6 | 7:30 PM | No. 3 Albany at No. 2 Stony Brook | 63–56 | ESPN3 | 4,009 |
Championship – Saturday, March 11
| 7 | 11:00 am | No. 3 Albany at No. 1 Vermont | 53–56 | ESPN2 | 3,266 |
*Game times in ET. #-Rankings denote tournament seeding. All games hosted by higher-seeded team.

== Bracket and results ==
Teams will reseed after each round with highest remaining seeds receiving home court advantage.

Quarterfinals; Wednesday, March 1, 2017; ESPN3
1 | Vermont | 86
8 | Maine | 41
4 | New Hampshire | 74
5 | UMBC | 65
(Pairings are reseeded after the first round)
2 | Stony Brook | 70
7 | Binghamton | 60
3 | Albany | 100
6 | Hartford | 71

Semifinals; Monday, March 6, 2017; ESPN3
1 | Vermont | 74
4 | New Hampshire | 41
2 | Stony Brook | 56
3 | Albany | 63

Championship; Saturday, March 11, 2017; ESPN2
1 | Vermont | 56
3 | Albany | 53

== See also ==
- America East Conference
- 2017 America East women's basketball tournament
