= Giffen Hill =

Highpoint at the University of Maryland

University of Maryland Baltimore County Campus
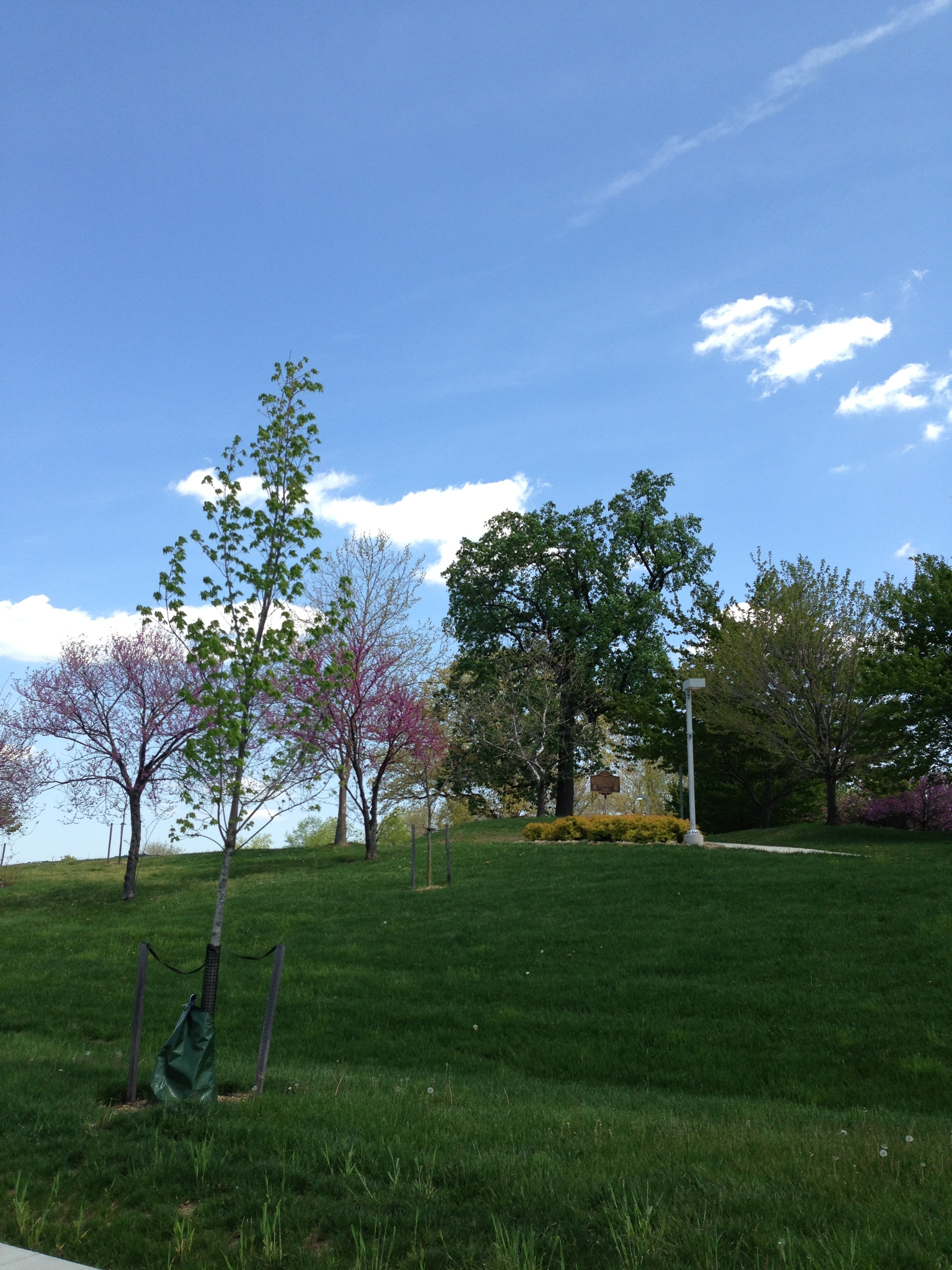

Giffen Hill
- Dedicated: 1996
- Location: Hilltop Circle and Commons Drive; Baltimore, Maryland 21250

Giffen Hill is a highpoint on the campus of the University of Maryland, Baltimore County in Arbutus, Maryland, and is a historic site of the Manual Labor School for Indigent Boys. The hill is a gathering place near the UMBC Stadium, and will be adjacent to the future site of the UMBC Events Center, planned to open in 2017.

== History ==
Originally, the site was the location of the brick residence for the Manual Labor School for Indigent Boys, constructed in 1860. The school was also simply known as the Baltimore Farm School, due to agriculture being the main focus of curriculum. Numerous renowned Baltimoreans were involved with the school's operations, like Johns Hopkins, and Gustav W. Lurman Jr. who both served on the school's board of directors. The Farm School operated from 1839 to 1922, until it was absorbed by the Spring Grove Hospital Center, and then subsequently transferred to its present owner, the University of Maryland, Baltimore County.

In May 1996, the Coalition for the Preservation of Southwestern Baltimore County, the Catonsville Historical Trust, and the Baltimore County Historical Trust dedicated the historical site. UMBC named the hill for Vice President Sallie Giffen. Historic white oak trees also occupy the historic hilltop.
