= Retriever Activities Center =

Multi-purpose athletic facility at the University of Maryland, Baltimore County

- RAC
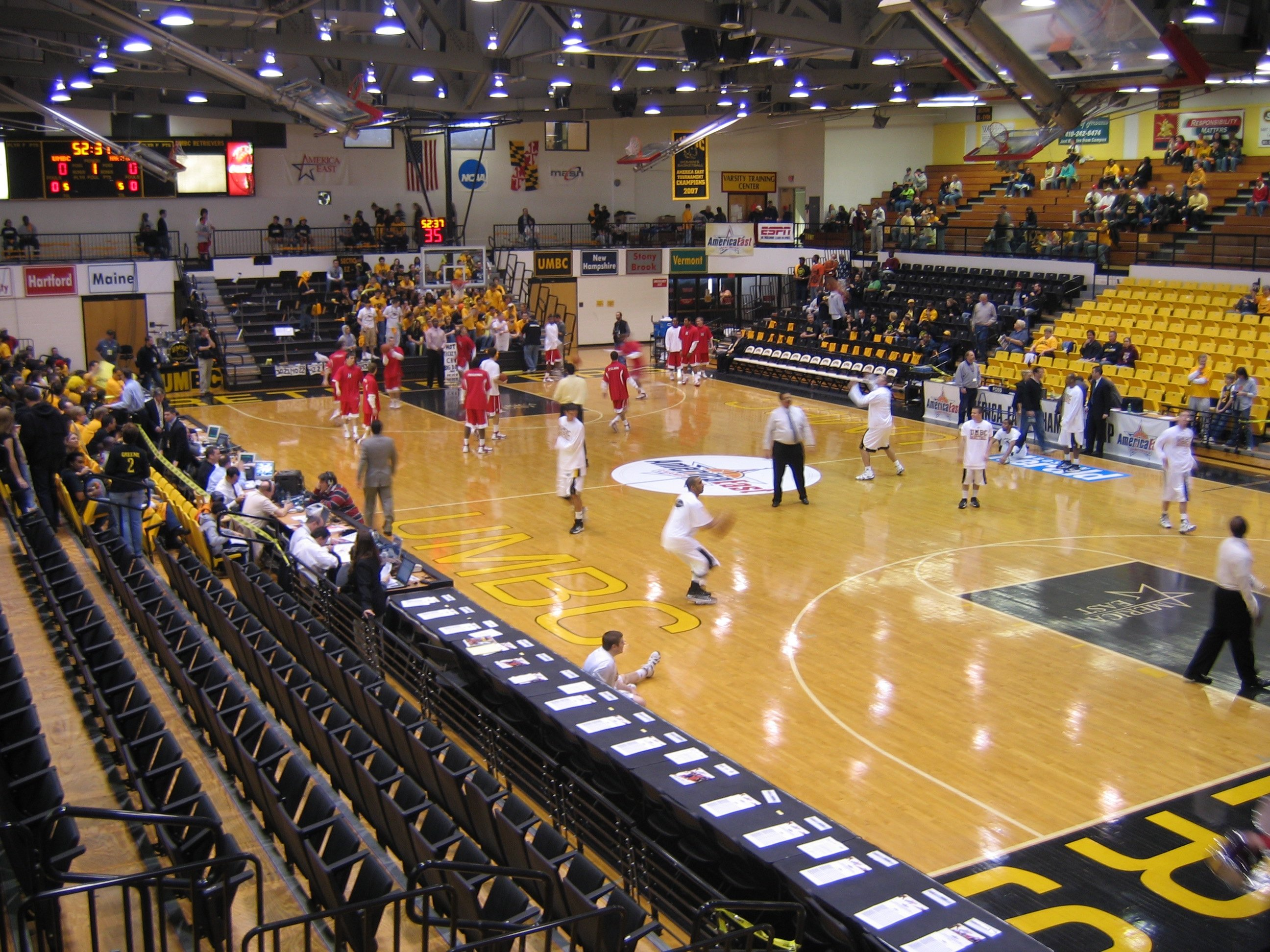
- The Retriever Activities Center prior to the 2008 America East Conference Championship Game
- Interactive map of Retriever Activities Center
- Former names: UMBC Fieldhouse
- Address: 1000 Hilltop Cir, Baltimore, MD 21250
- Coordinates: 39.252899°N 76.712267°W
- Owner: University of Maryland, Baltimore County
- Capacity: 4,024
- Public transit: MTA 77

Tenant
- UMBC Retrievers

Retriever Activities Center is a 4,024-seat multi-purpose arena in Catonsville, Maryland. The arena opened in 1973. It was home to the UMBC Retrievers basketball and volleyball teams, which represent the University of Maryland, Baltimore County in NCAA Division I athletics, from its opening until the larger Chesapeake Employers Insurance Arena opened on campus in February 2018. It hosted the 2008 America East Conference men's basketball tournament final.

== Background ==
The Retriever Activities Center (RAC) has numerous purposes for UMBC, both for athletics and student life. The aforementioned UMBC Event Center, located at the intersection of Hilltop Circle and Commons Drive, adjacent to Giffen Hill, replaced the RAC for various activities including varsity basketball and volleyball games, student-athlete health, student events, and commencement ceremonies.

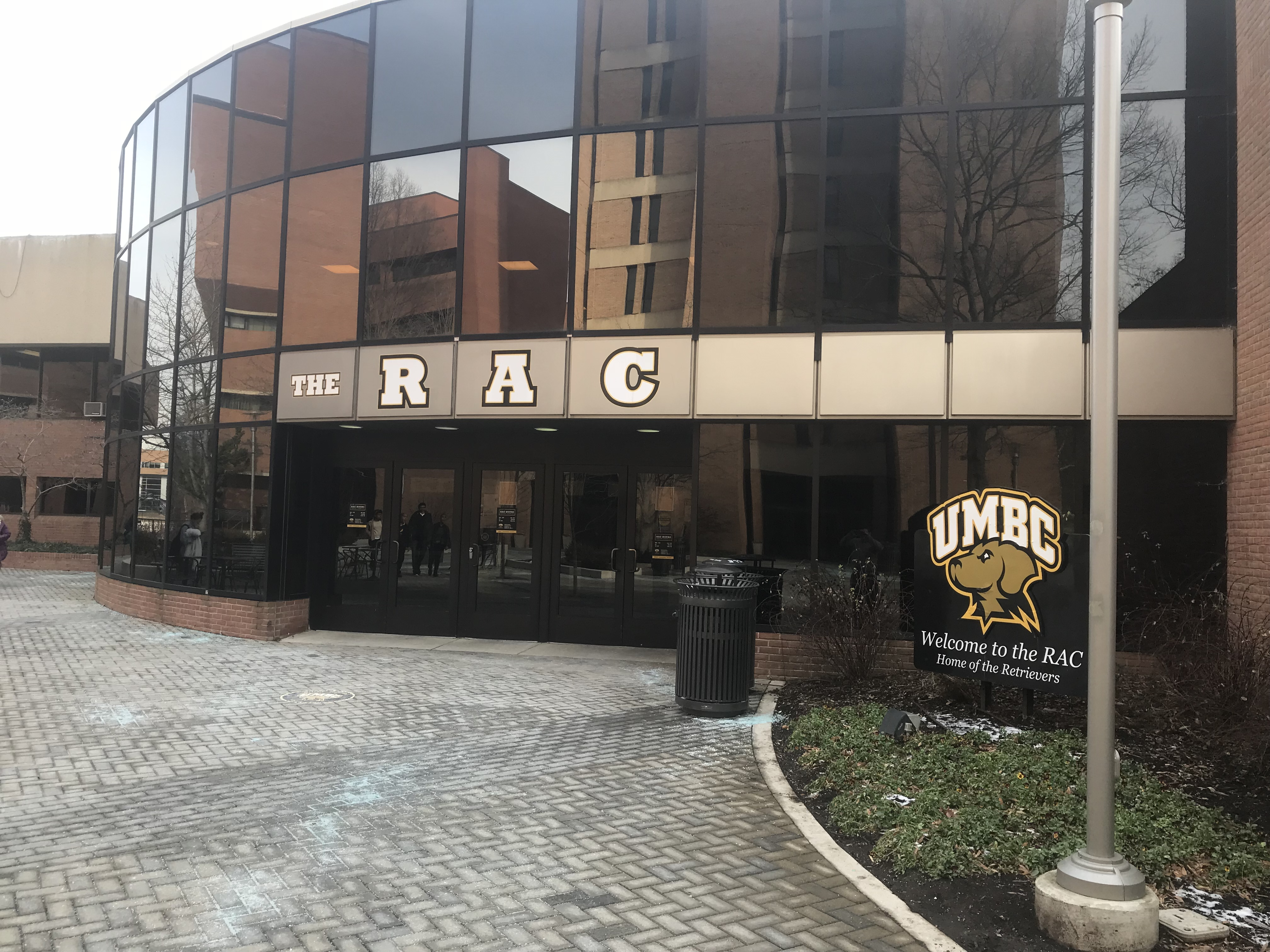
The entrance to the RAC in December 2017.

The RAC includes:

- UMBC Aquatic Complex, a state-of-the-art swimming pool complex (indoor and outdoor), as well as locker rooms and showers.
- RAC Arena, formerly the university's main arena; previously used for basketball and volleyball games and commencement ceremonies, and still used for other events.
- RAC Gymnasium, the student gym complex includes a weight room, cardio balcony, and fitness studio.
- Arena Track, an indoor track encircling the main arena used for running and jogging.
- Outdoor Tennis Courts, located behind the RAC, the Outdoor Tennis Courts offer an additional amenity to the center.

== See also ==
- List of NCAA Division I basketball arenas
